= 1995 WAFL season =

Australian rules football season

- Teams: 8
- Premiers: West Perth; 16th premiership
- Minor premiers: Subiaco; 8th minor premiership
- Sandover Medallist: Craig Treleven (East Fremantle)
- Bernie Naylor Medallist: Jason Heatley (Subiaco)
- Matches played: 88

The 1995 WAFL season was the 111th season of the West Australian Football League in its various incarnations. Already depleted in strength by the rise of the West Coast Eagles, the WAFL suffered a further blow to its popularity and standard when the AFL, to counter the Eagles' dominance of the early 1990s with a champion defence and vast player depth, introduced the Fremantle Dockers as a second Western Australian club.

The introduction of Fremantle into the AFL meant that the national league was competing with the WAFL on every weekend, and this led to an acceleration of the long-term decline in WAFL attendances. Crowds declined by forty-six percent compared to 1994 figures, and the resultant financial problems led to many proposals to improve the competition's appeal, ultimately leading to the abortive renaming "Westar Rules" and the introduction of a ninth club, Mandurah-based Peel Thunder, who proved perennially un-competitive on-field for almost two decades. The WAFL's proposed move of perennial tailender Perth to the Perth Hills was voted down by the Demons' board on 11 July, when that body's members voted 115 to 83 to remain at Lathlain Park, largely because of the unaffordability of WAFL-standard facilities in Gosnells.

1995 saw the abandonment of another abortive experiment, that of allowing a fifth team in the finals, although the "double-header" introduced with the final five in 1991 was retained for the first week of finals.

Under former star player Gary Buckenara, Subiaco dominated the home-and-away season losing only two matches, but were narrowly beaten in the second semi-final and thrashed in the Grand Final by West Perth – now firmly established at Joondalup – due to an outstanding performance from Darren Harris. Subiaco were spearheaded by Jason Heatley, who after several years of very poor records from full-forwards, produced a century of goals in a WAFL home-and-away season for the first time since Mick Rea ten seasons beforehand. The Falcons, who had not won a title since 1975 apart from a Colts premiership in 1990, won the pre-season "Emu Export Cup" as well as the premiership.

In contrast, Swan Districts, under new coach Graham Melrose after John Todd returned to South Fremantle and having lost several key players including David Ogg, Kevin Caton and Paul Gow to country clubs, lost their first fifteen games and would not return to the finals until 2004. A plan to install lights at Bassendean for $160,000 was abandoned by the local council because it was thought there would be too much competition with sports such as basketball and soccer, whilst longtime president Bill Walker resigned under the duress of major financial problems.

== Home-and-away season ==
=== Round 1 ===
	Round 1
Saturday, 8 April (2:15 pm)	West Perth 12.14 (86)	def. by	South Fremantle 14.12 (96)	Arena Joondalup (crowd: 2265)
Saturday, 8 April (2:15 pm)	East Fremantle 13.12 (90)	def.	Claremont 10.9 (69)	East Fremantle Oval (crowd: 1892)
Saturday, 8 April (2:15 pm)	Perth 13.14 (92)	def. by	East Perth 15.11 (101)	Lathlain Park (crowd: 1938)
Saturday, 8 April (2:15 pm)	Swan Districts 7.13 (55)	def. by	Subiaco 22.20 (152)	Bassendean Oval (crowd: 2001)
In a rough match marred by the report of the fiery Karl Langdon (who was found not guilty), new Subiaco coach Buckenara makes a masterstroke of using the fiery forward at the centre bounces to successfully unsettle Swan Districts, who do not goal until less than a minute before the half-time siren.; Defying pre-season predictions of a wooden spoon, East Perth are led by a debutant Dean Grainger to hold off a determined Demon charge at the finish.

=== Round 2 (Easter weekend) ===
	Round 2
Saturday, 15 April (2:15 pm)	Claremont 16.8 (104)	def. by	Subiaco 16.14 (110)	Claremont Oval (crowd: 1809)
Saturday, 15 April (2:15 pm)	Perth 10.14 (74)	def.	Swan Districts 8.10 (58)	Lathlain Park (crowd: 1754)
Monday, 17 April (2:15 pm)	East Perth 14.7 (91)	def. by	West Perth 24.17 (161)	Perth Oval (crowd: 3170)
Monday, 17 April (2:15 pm)	South Fremantle 14.7 (91)	def. by	East Fremantle 14.18 (102)	Fremantle Oval (crowd: 5232)
Subiaco claim a brilliant comeback victory from twenty points down against the breeze with superb work from centre half-forward Andrew Donnelly and an amazing fifty-metre goal from Glenelg recruit Hamish Stuart.; With Fremantle-listed forward Chris Groom kicking eight goals, West Perth race away from their traditional rivals as the tired Royals cannot pressure the Falcon running brigade.

=== Round 3 (Anzac Day) ===
	Round 3
Saturday, 22 April (2:15 pm)	East Fremantle 18.14 (122)	def.	East Perth 9.6 (60)	East Fremantle Oval (crowd: 1911)
Saturday, 22 April (2:15 pm)	Swan Districts 12.11 (83)	def. by	Claremont 14.9 (93)	Bassendean Oval (crowd: 1708)
Saturday, 22 April (2:15 pm)	West Perth 17.20 (122)	def.	Perth 4.11 (35)	Arena Joondalup (crowd: 2426)
Tuesday, 25 April (2:15 pm)	Subiaco 14.19 (103)	def.	South Fremantle 14.15 (99)	Leederville Oval (crowd: 3523)
Subiaco play two games at West Perth's former home of Leederville Oval due to redevelopment at Subiaco.; Peter Sumich in only his second WAFL game for six seasons, plays for the Bulldogs at centre half-back, but Lions' rookie Rob Hansen kicks winning goal after siren.; Claremont captain-coach Daniel Panizza breaks Ken Caporn's club record of 273 league games, but has to watch his first win as a senior coach due to injury and the Tigers struggle to hold out Swans.; Despite excellent form from nomadic ex-Geelong reserves rover Scott Loving, East Perth are swamped by an eleven-goal last quarter blitz that makes coach Robert Solin call the club's form "unacceptable".

=== Round 4 ===
	Round 4
Saturday, 29 April (2:15 pm)	West Perth 21.8 (134)	def.	Swan Districts 10.12 (72)	Arena Joondalup (crowd: 2178)
Saturday, 29 April (2:15 pm)	Perth 11.12 (78)	def. by	East Fremantle 13.13 (91)	Lathlain Park (crowd: 1624)
Sunday, 30 April (2:15 pm)	South Fremantle 13.10 (88)	def. by	Claremont 18.12 (120)	Fremantle Oval (crowd: 2044)
Sunday, 30 April (2:15 pm)	East Perth 11.27 (93)	def.	Subiaco 9.9 (63)	Perth Oval (crowd: 2194)
East Perth inflict Subiaco's first defeat despite shocking inaccuracy as their midfield mans up brilliantly to shut down the dangerous Lion attack.

=== Round 5 ===
	Round 5
Saturday, 6 May (2:15 pm)	East Fremantle 13.13 (91)	def. by	West Perth 24.18 (162)	East Fremantle Oval (crowd: 2076)
Saturday, 6 May (2:15 pm)	Subiaco 24.18 (162)	def.	Perth 9.11 (65)	Leederville Oval (crowd: 1460)
Saturday, 6 May (2:15 pm)	Claremont 14.16 (100)	def.	East Perth 8.7 (55)	Claremont Oval (crowd: 1455)
Saturday, 6 May (2:15 pm)	Swan Districts 14.8 (92)	def. by	South Fremantle 18.8 (116)	Bassendean Oval (crowd: 2214)
Former Claremont centreman Rob Malone's handball devastates the unbeaten Sharks and provides West Perth's best win of the first half of the season.; Heatley kicks 10.5 (65) for the Lions, figures he was to better a few weeks later, in the last WAFL/Westar Rules game at Leederville Oval until East Perth was forced to move there by the redevelopment of Perth Oval for soccer club Perth Glory.

=== Round 6 ===
	Round 6
Saturday, 13 May (2:15 pm)	East Fremantle 29.12 (186)	def.	Swan Districts 15.12 (102)	East Fremantle Oval (crowd: 1489)
Saturday, 13 May (2:15 pm)	East Perth 13.11 (89)	def. by	South Fremantle 19.6 (120)	Perth Oval (crowd: 1845)
Saturday, 13 May (2:15 pm)	West Perth 11.16 (82)	def. by	Subiaco 24.9 (153)	Arena Joondalup (crowd: 2304)
Saturday, 13 May (2:15 pm)	Perth 14.15 (99)	def. by	Claremont 16.13 (109)	Lathlain Park (crowd: 1388)
The presence of Eagle squad members Tony Godden and Jarrad Schofield gives Subiaco the class needed to crush the Falcons and return to top position. Schofield's blocks and knock-ons consistently win the Lions crucial possessions.; Former soccer and lacrosse junior Gavin Milentis reveals remarkable poise and exciting natural skills as the Tigers narrowly seize a seesawing battle.; Future AFL regular Chad Rintoul stars for East Fremantle in his first WAFL game

=== Round 7 ===
	Round 7
Saturday, 20 May (2:15 pm)	Subiaco 19.23 (137)	def.	East Fremantle 15.10 (100)	Subiaco Oval (crowd: 2291)
Saturday, 20 May (2:15 pm)	Swan Districts 6.5 (41)	def. by	East Perth 15.20 (110)	Bunbury (crowd: 3500)
Saturday, 20 May (2:15 pm)	South Fremantle 26.11 (167)	def.	Perth 11.6 (72)	Fremantle Oval (crowd: 1703)
Saturday, 20 May (2:15 pm)	Claremont 17.16 (118)	def.	West Perth 9.14 (68)	Claremont Oval (crowd: 1928)
Despite losing Kingsley Hunter to a broken collarbone, Claremont easily defeat West Perth as Chris Gerreyn takes over in attack and Matthew Gauci shuts out the Falcon forwards.

=== Round 8 ===
	Round 8
Saturday, 27 May (2:15 pm)	Claremont 10.11 (71)	def.	East Fremantle 9.13 (67)	Claremont Oval (crowd: 1694)
Saturday, 27 May (2:15 pm)	Subiaco 27.22 (184)	def.	Swan Districts 13.8 (86)	Subiaco Oval (crowd: 1675)
Saturday, 27 May (2:15 pm)	South Fremantle 19.16 (130)	def.	West Perth 10.9 (69)	Fremantle Oval (crowd: 2144)
Saturday, 27 May (2:15 pm)	Perth 13.13 (91)	def. by	East Perth 17.15 (117)	Lathlain Park (crowd: 1632)
Chris Gerreyn kicks a goal after the siren for Claremont's sixth consecutive victory – while all eighteen Sharks yell to put him off balance.; Jason Heatley kicks 14 goals 6 behinds, the best figures ever in a match between Subiaco and Swan Districts, from 26 kicks and fourteen marks, as he seems to quash the doubted over his physique not being solid enough for a full-forward.

=== Round 9 (Foundation Day) ===
	Round 9
Saturday, 3 June (2:15 pm)	Swan Districts 11.5 (71)	def. by	Perth 23.8 (146)	Bassendean Oval (crowd: 1598)
Saturday, 3 June (2:15 pm)	Subiaco 24.13 (157)	def.	Claremont 16.16 (112)	Subiaco Oval (crowd: 2466)
Monday, 5 June (2:15 pm)	East Fremantle 15.9 (99)	def.	South Fremantle 15.7 (97)	East Fremantle Oval (crowd: 6,601)
Monday, 5 June (2:15 pm)	West Perth 15.10 (100)	def.	East Perth 11.14 (80)	Arena Joondalup (crowd: 2772)
David Glascott's talent-spotting works wonders with former East Perth rover Dean Bertram, whose overlooked pace and skill ambushed the winless Swans. Bertram was discarded by the Royals and watched the opening game from the Lathlain Park grandstand.; West Perth pay its respect to former champions Whinnen and Dempsey with a fine display into a strong breeze that restricts East Perth to three behinds in the last quarter.; Despite the report of defender Denis Repacholi – who also had his jaw shattered – East Fremantle, with Lockyer kicking nine, snatch an unlikely Derby win after being behind for all of the second half.

=== Round 10 ===
	Round 10
Saturday, 10 June (2:15 pm)	East Perth 9.9 (63)	def. by	East Fremantle 16.12 (108)	Perth Oval (crowd: 1215)
Saturday, 10 June (2:15 pm)	Perth 18.13 (121)	def.	West Perth 17.12 (114)	Lathlain Park (crowd: 1634)
Saturday, 10 June (2:15 pm)	Subiaco 13.18 (96)	def.	South Fremantle 14.11 (95)	Subiaco Oval (crowd: 1969)
Saturday, 10 June (2:15 pm)	Claremont 20.9 (129)	def.	Swan Districts 9.10 (64)	Claremont Oval (crowd: 1197)
Perth, after a taunt by the crowd, come back from 38 points down for a huge upset over the eventual premiers

=== Round 11 ===
	Round 11
Saturday, 17 June (2:15 pm)	Claremont 10.11 (71)	def. by	South Fremantle 13.13 (91)	Claremont Oval (crowd: 1885)
Saturday, 17 June (2:15 pm)	Swan Districts 13.11 (89)	def. by	West Perth 18.14 (122)	Bassendean Oval (crowd: 1571)
Saturday, 17 June (2:15 pm)	East Fremantle 27.16 (178)	def.	Perth 7.8 (50)	East Fremantle Oval (crowd: 1743)
Saturday, 17 June (2:15 pm)	Subiaco 15.18 (108)	def.	East Perth 14.10 (94)	Subiaco Oval (crowd: 2085)
Despite ending a worrying slump, West Perth lose five key players to injury, have Todd Curley and Brendon Fewster reported (both were cleared) and face the top four in their next four matches.; Former West Coast Eagle defender Andrew Lockyer kicks fourteen goals at full-forward for the Sharks, beating both Bob Johnson's thirteen goals at East Fremantle Oval against East Perth in 1965 and George Doig's thirteen against Perth (Note: Perth were known as Victoria Park in the 1934 and 1935 seasons.) in 1934.

=== Round 12 ===
	Round 12
Saturday, 24 June (2:15 pm)	Subiaco 21.20 (146)	def.	Perth 14.8 (92)	Subiaco Oval (crowd: 1576)
Saturday, 24 June (2:15 pm)	East Perth 12.7 (79)	def. by	Claremont 18.7 (115)	Perth Oval (crowd: 1388)
Saturday, 24 June (2:15 pm)	West Perth 20.7 (127)	def.	East Fremantle 13.14 (92)	Arena Joondalup (crowd: 1931)
Saturday, 24 June (2:15 pm)	South Fremantle 23.14 (152)	def.	Swan Districts 15.8 (98)	Fremantle Oval (crowd: 1573)
The toughness of former high school rugby league star Geoff Valentine and the brilliance of Claremont discard Brendan Barrows leads the Falcons to a confidence-boosting victory.; A surprise decision to star former century goalkicker John Hutton at full-back pays off – he plays well in defence and kicks five goals from the eighteen-minute mark of the last quarter when returned to full-forward.; On 1 July, there was a break from WAFL games for an interstate game with Queensland.

=== Round 13 ===
	Round 13
Saturday, 8 July (2:15 pm)	West Perth 11.8 (74)	def.	Claremont 1.7 (13)	Arena Joondalup (crowd: 1194)
Saturday, 8 July (2:15 pm)	East Fremantle 7.15 (57)	def. by	Subiaco 11.11 (77)	East Fremantle Oval (crowd: 1399)
Saturday, 8 July (2:15 pm)	Perth 7.9 (51)	def. by	South Fremantle 13.6 (84)	Lathlain Park (crowd: 964)
Saturday, 8 July (2:15 pm)	East Perth 14.15 (99)	def.	Swan Districts 10.6 (66)	Perth Oval (crowd: 1051)
In heavy rain and winds reaching 80 kilometres per hour (50 mph), Chris Gerreyn kicks Claremont's only goal from a free kick after twelve minutes.; It is the first single goal score in the WANFL/WAFL/WASFL since East Perth in 1956, and the first of fewer than three since Swan Districts in 1968. The previous time a WAFL team did not goal after quarter-time was Subiaco against East Fremantle in 1954.; In the worst conditions in the WAFL for several seasons, Subiaco replicate previous strong finishes to kick eight of the final nine goals and move an amazing four wins clear at the top.

=== Round 14 ===
	Round 14
Saturday, 15 July (2:15 pm)	Claremont 7.10 (52)	def. by	Perth 9.5 (59)	Claremont Oval (crowd: 1084)
Saturday, 15 July (2:15 pm)	Swan Districts 10.9 (69)	def. by	East Fremantle 15.16 (106)	Bassendean Oval (crowd: 1112)
Saturday, 15 July (2:15 pm)	Subiaco 10.12 (72)	def. by	West Perth 14.13 (97)	Subiaco Oval (crowd: 2468)
Saturday, 15 July (2:15 pm)	South Fremantle 10.10 (70)	def.	East Perth 8.12 (60)	Fremantle Oval (crowd: 1870)
West Perth coach John Dimmer's skill in using AFL-listed Ashley Burton in defence leads the Falcons to end Subiaco's nine-match winning run in the tough conditions. West Perth shut down the Lions' key forward targets and control the ball well in attack.; In appalling conditions with heavy rain and darkness so complete Bassendean's inadequate training lights are turned on, Swan Districts remain winless after again failing to play the full four quarters.

=== Round 15 ===
	Round 15
Saturday, 22 July (2:15 pm)	Claremont 9.15 (69)	def. by	East Fremantle 10.16 (76)	Geraldton (crowd: 2600)
Saturday, 22 July (2:15 pm)	Swan Districts 10.16 (76)	def. by	Subiaco 26.25 (181)	Bassendean Oval (crowd: 1556)
Saturday, 22 July (2:15 pm)	East Perth 16.15 (111)	def.	Perth 10.12 (72)	Perth Oval (crowd: 1333)
Saturday, 22 July (2:15 pm)	South Fremantle 14.10 (94)	def.	West Perth 13.9 (87)	Fremantle Oval (crowd: 2637)
South Fremantle, although lacking seven regular players, kick three goals in four minutes of time-on of the last quarter to end West Perth's impressive winning sequence.

=== Round 16 ===
	Round 16
Saturday, 29 July (2:15 pm)	Claremont 8.18 (66)	def. by	Subiaco 15.12 (102)	Claremont Oval (crowd: 1045)
Saturday, 29 July (2:15 pm)	Perth 13.11 (89)	def. by	Swan Districts 17.10 (112)	Lathlain Park (crowd: 1163)
Saturday, 29 July (2:15 pm)	South Fremantle 10.14 (74)	def.	East Fremantle 4.8 (32)	Fremantle Oval (crowd: 3086)
Saturday, 29 July (2:15 pm)	East Perth 15.21 (111)	def.	West Perth 10.8 (68)	Perth Oval (crowd: 1356)
John Porter produces a brilliant display on East Fremantle goal machine Andrew Lockyer making only one mistake – for the Sharks' sole second half goal – in tough conditions.; Swan Districts avoid a winless season in a comeback win after defender Todd Hawes is rushed to hospital with a bleeding larynx.

=== Round 17 ===
	Round 17
Saturday, 5 August (2:15 pm)	Swan Districts 7.14 (56)	def. by	Claremont 14.16 (100)	Bassendean Oval (crowd: 1386)
Saturday, 5 August (2:15 pm)	East Fremantle 11.12 (78)	def. by	East Perth 16.11 (107)	East Fremantle Oval (crowd: 1708)
Saturday, 5 August (2:15 pm)	West Perth 25.19 (169)	def.	Perth 11.10 (76)	Arena Joondalup (crowd: 1582)
Saturday, 5 August (2:15 pm)	Subiaco 20.22 (142)	def.	South Fremantle 13.10 (88)	Subiaco Oval (crowd: 2939)
West Perth, goalless at quarter-time, kick nine and eleven in their two quarters with the breeze to annihilate the Demons. Paul Mifka, who began at full-back, was moved to a half forward flank and kicked ten goals.

=== Round 18 ===
	Round 18
Saturday, 12 August (2:15 pm)	South Fremantle 14.19 (103)	def.	Claremont 9.14 (68)	Fremantle Oval (crowd: 1692)
Saturday, 12 August (2:15 pm)	East Perth 17.16 (118)	def. by	Subiaco 19.6 (120)	Perth Oval (crowd: 1872)
Saturday, 12 August (2:15 pm)	Perth 9.11 (65)	def. by	East Fremantle 16.13 (109)	Lathlain Park (crowd: 1156)
Saturday, 12 August (2:15 pm)	West Perth 14.16 (100)	def.	Swan Districts 8.7 (55)	Arena Joondalup (crowd: 1282)
A depleted Claremont team fails against a strengthened Bulldog outfit eager to obtain the double chance – in the process placing its finals hopes in severe jeopardy.; Incredibly accurate kicking in wet conditions allows Subiaco to hold off East Perth and end the Royals' finals hopes, after being nineteen points behind early in the final quarter.

=== Round 19 ===
	Round 19
Saturday, 19 August (2:15 pm)	East Fremantle 10.11 (71)	def. by	West Perth 18.17 (125)	East Fremantle Oval (crowd: 1320)
Saturday, 19 August (2:15 pm)	Claremont 12.4 (76)	def.	East Perth 10.10 (70)	Claremont Oval (crowd: 1106)
Saturday, 19 August (2:15 pm)	Swan Districts 14.11 (95)	def.	South Fremantle 10.10 (70)	Bassendean Oval (crowd: 1165)
Saturday, 19 August (2:15 pm)	Subiaco 25.21 (171)	def.	Perth 11.14 (80)	Subiaco Oval (crowd: 1374)
A commanding win with eleven of twelve goals in a period of the second and third quarters claims second position for West Perth and confirm critical opinion of them as Subiaco's biggest premiership rival.; An innovative ploy by coach Panizza of using three wingmen helps Claremont narrowly stay in the running for the finals as their accuracy holds off a determined East Perth.; Jason Heatley reached 100 goals with six during the first quarter, but tears a muscle in his left leg to place him in doubt for the finals.

=== Round 20 ===
	Round 20
Saturday, 26 August (2:15 pm)	Perth 11.8 (74)	def. by	Claremont 18.15 (123)	Lathlain Park (crowd: 1339)
Saturday, 26 August (2:15 pm)	West Perth 21.14 (140)	def. by	Subiaco 22.11 (143)	Arena Joondalup (crowd: 3368)
Saturday, 26 August (2:15 pm)	East Perth 15.13 (103)	def.	South Fremantle 11.10 (76)	Perth Oval (crowd: 1739)
Saturday, 26 August (2:15 pm)	East Fremantle 25.16 (166)	def.	Swan Districts 11.15 (81)	East Fremantle Oval (crowd: 1458)
In a shootout reminiscent of the 1980s, West Perth kick 11.2 (68) in the last quarter but fail to knock off the Lions.; South Fremantle, after losing to bottom side Swan Districts, suffer a second embarrassing loss – they were fifty-eight points behind before kicking six of their final seven goals of the match – as their reliance in attack on Sumich and Dorotich has them undone upon their failure.

=== Round 21 ===
	Round 21
Saturday, 2 September (2:15 pm)	Subiaco 20.19 (139)	def.	East Fremantle 19.19 (133)	Subiaco Oval (crowd: 2192)
Saturday, 2 September (2:15 pm)	South Fremantle 11.8 (74)	def. by	Perth 11.17 (83)	Fremantle Oval (crowd: 1903)
Saturday, 2 September (2:15 pm)	Claremont 10.8 (68)	def. by	West Perth 20.15 (135)	Claremont Oval (crowd: 2137)
Saturday, 2 September (2:15 pm)	Swan Districts 13.14 (92)	def. by	East Perth 16.13 (109)	Bassendean Oval (crowd: 1824)
A collision between Brendon Logan and Tiger defender Matthew Gauci seems to put Claremont off their game – West Perth kick six goals in ten minutes to turn a close match into a rout.; Perth achieve an amazing win to send outgoing coach David Glascott out on a high, kicking 7.6 (48) to 1.1 (7) after having only four goals in three quarters.

== Ladder ==
1995 WAFL ladder
Pos	Team	Pld	W	L	D	PF	PA	PP	Pts
1	Subiaco	21	19	2	0	2718	1932	140.7	76
2	West Perth (P)	21	13	8	0	2342	1871	125.2	52
3	South Fremantle	21	12	9	0	2075	1818	114.1	48
4	East Fremantle	21	12	9	0	2154	1913	112.6	48
5	Claremont	21	11	10	0	1846	1800	102.6	44
6	East Perth	21	10	11	0	1920	1939	99.0	40
7	Perth	21	5	16	0	1664	2441	68.2	20
8	Swan Districts	21	2	19	0	1613	2618	61.6	8

Rules for classification: 1) points; 2) percentage; 3) number of points for.
(P) Premiers

== Finals ==
=== Semi-finals ===
	First semi-final
Sunday, 10 September (11:15 am)	South Fremantle 10.15 (75)	def. by	East Fremantle 18.5 (113)	Subiaco Oval (crowd: 12,949)
Andrew Lockyer kicks his hundredth goal for the Sharks, finishing the season with 105.

	Second semi-final
Sunday, 10 September (2:15 pm)	Subiaco 16.11 (107)	def. by	West Perth 16.12 (108)	Subiaco Oval (crowd: 12,949)
Since the two semi-finals were played at the same venue on the same day, the attendance figure is the same.; Jason Heatley kicks ten goals for Subiaco, raising his tally to 118, but a behind by Rob Malone prevents a thriller going into extra time. (Note: The WAFL, along with the AFL, introduced extra time for finals tied in regulation time for the 1991 season.)

=== Preliminary final ===
	Preliminary final
Saturday, 16 September (2:15 pm)	Subiaco 17.20 (122)	def.	East Fremantle 16.13 (109)	Subiaco Oval (crowd: 7,265)
Nathan O'Connor, in the extremely unfamiliar role of a "tagger", shuts out dangerous East Fremantle midfielder Craig Treleven and sets up many Lion goals to prove the decisive factor in a close victory.

=== Grand Final ===
1995 WAFL Grand Final
Sunday, 24 September (2:15 pm)	West Perth	def.	Subiaco	Subiaco Oval (crowd: 30,712)
4.3 (27); 9.7 (61); 15.9 (99); 21.11 (137)	Q1; Q2; Q3; Final	3.4 (22); 5.6 (36); 7.6 (48); 12.9 (81)	Umpires: Sam Kronja, Trevor Garrett, Darren Starcevich; Simpson Medal: Darren Harris (West Perth)
Groom 5, Darren Harris 4, Smith 4, Downsborough 3, Mildenhall 2, Curley, O'Brien, Logan	Goals	Miller 2, Willett 2, Donnelly, Schofield, Macnish, Heatley, Moraghan, Breman, Langdon
Darren Harris, Malone, Mifka, Trewhella, Logan, Smith	Best	O'Connor, Dunton, Parker, Schofield, Lamb, Langdon
Reports	Langdon for striking Curley; Miller for using insulting gestures towards umpire.
A ferocious West Perth side breaks a twenty year premiership drought in the most violent WAFL Grand Final since 1981, with Harris having an amazing 40 possessions and fullback Mifka keeping Heatley to just one goal.
