= Bernie Naylor Medal =

Australian football award

The Bernie Naylor Medal is an Australian rules football award which is given to the leading goalkicker at the end of each home and away season in the West Australian Football League. It is named after South Fremantle full-forward Bernie Naylor. Before the Bernie Naylor Medal was first awarded in 1996, there was no physical award given to the competition's leading goalkicker, although there had been proposals for such a trophy to be instituted.

In 2025, the WAFL announced any player who was leading goalkicker between seasons 1955 and 1995 would be recognised as Bernie Naylor Medalists retrospectively.

== Leading goalkickers ==
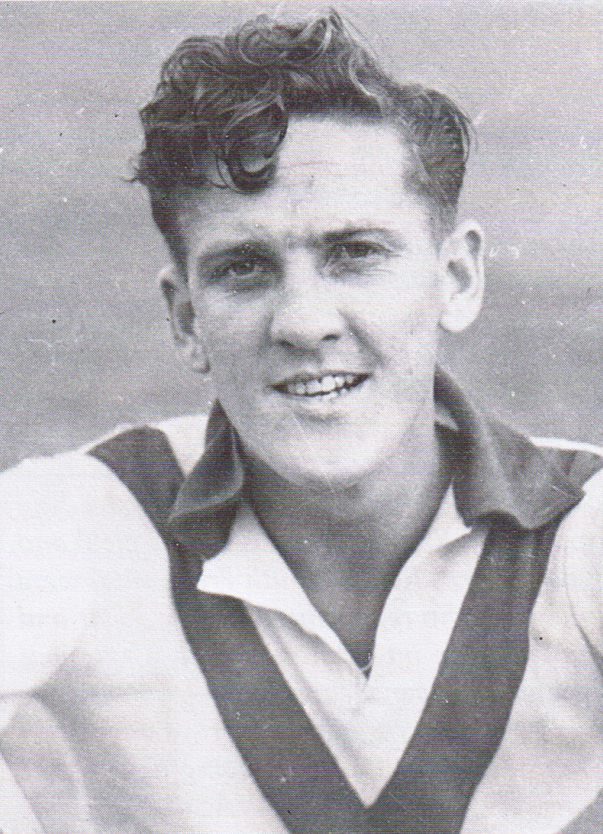
Bernie Naylor

The goal tallies listed below include those kicked in the finals where applicable.

WAFL/WANFL/WASFL/Westar Rules leading goalkickers
Season	Leading goalkicker	Club	Total
2026	Tyler Keitel (6)	West Perth	51 goals
2025	Tyler Keitel (5)	West Perth	52 goals
2024	Tyler Keitel (4)	West Perth	56 goals
2023	Tyler Keitel (3)	West Perth	57 goals
2022	Ben Sokol (2)	Subiaco	41 goals
2021	Tyler Keitel (2)	West Perth	64 goals
2020	Mason Shaw	South Fremantle	23 goals
2019	Ben Sokol	Subiaco	51 goals
2018	Andrew Strijk (Note: Equal leading goalkicker at end of home-and-away season)	West Perth	51 goals
2018	Tyler Keitel	West Perth	50 goals
2017	Liam Ryan	Subiaco	71 goals
2016	Ben Saunders	South Fremantle	52 goals
2015	Shane Yarran	Subiaco	54 goals
2014	Ben Saunders	South Fremantle	59 goals
2013	Josh Smith	East Perth	62 goals
2012	Ben Saunders	South Fremantle	66 goals
2011	Blake Broadhurst	Subiaco	68 goals
2010	Chad Jones	Claremont	85 goals
2009	Chad Jones	Claremont	77 goals
2008	Brad Smith	Subiaco	110 goals
2007	Brad Smith	Subiaco	126 goals
2006	Troy Wilson	East Perth	74 goals
2005	Lachlan Oakley	Subiaco	80 goals
2004	Brad Smith	Subiaco	109 goals
2003	Brad Smith	Subiaco	84 goals
2002	Zane Parsons	South Fremantle	65 goals
2001	Paul Medhurst	Claremont	78 goals
2000	Rod Tregenza	East Fremantle	86 goals
1999	Rod Tregenza	East Fremantle	57 goals
1998	Todd Ridley	Subiaco	77 goals
1997	Jon Dorotich	South Fremantle	114 goals
1996	Jon Dorotich	South Fremantle	88 goals
1995	Jason Heatley	Subiaco	123 goals
1994	Brenton Cooper	Perth	90 goals
1993	Jason Heatley	Subiaco	111 goals
1992	Kevin Caton	Swan Districts	51 goals
1992	Craig Edwards	South Fremantle	54 goals
1991	John Hutton	Claremont	100 goals
1990	Glen Bartlett	East Perth	69 goals
1989	Neil Lester-Smith	East Fremantle	90 goals
1988	Todd Breman	Subiaco	75 goals
1987	Todd Breman	Subiaco	111 goals
1986	Mick Rea	Perth	90 goals
1985	Mick Rea	Perth	100 goals
1984	Brent Hutton	Swan Districts	83 goals
1983	Warren Ralph	Claremont	128 goals
1982	Warren Ralph	Claremont	115 goals
1981	Warren Ralph	Claremont	127 goals
1980	Warren Ralph	Claremont	85 goals
1980	Simon Beasley	Swan Districts	97 goals
1979	Kevin Taylor	East Fremantle	102 goals
1978	Ray Bauskis	South Fremantle	82 goals
1977	Ray Bauskis	South Fremantle	108 goals
1976	Norm Uncle	Claremont	91 goals
1975	Murray Couper	Perth	63 goals
1974	Max George	Swan Districts	90 goals
1973	Phil Smith	West Perth	84 goals
1972	Austin Robertson	Subiaco	98 goals
1971	Austin Robertson	Subiaco	111 goals
1970	Austin Robertson	Subiaco	116 goals
1969	Austin Robertson	Subiaco	114 goals
1968	Austin Robertson	Subiaco	162 goals
1967	Phil Tierney	East Perth	119 goals
1966	Bob Johnson	East Fremantle	92 goals
1965	Austin Robertson	Subiaco	116 goals
1964	Austin Robertson	Subiaco	96 goals
1963	Ron Evans	West Perth	97 goals
1962	Austin Robertson	Subiaco	89 goals
1961	John Gerovich	South Fremantle	74 goals
1960	John Gerovich	South Fremantle	101 goals
1959	Neil Hawke	East Perth	114 goals
1958	Bill Mose	East Perth	115 goals
1957	Don Glass	Subiaco	83 goals
1956	John Gerovich	South Fremantle	74 goals
1955	Ray Scott	West Perth	83 goals
1954	Bernie Naylor	South Fremantle	133 goals
1953	Bernie Naylor	South Fremantle	167 goals
1952	Bernie Naylor	South Fremantle	147 goals
1951	Ray Scott	West Perth	141 goals
1950	Ron Tucker	Perth	115 goals
1949	George Prince	East Fremantle	82 goals
1948	Bernie Naylor	South Fremantle	91 goals
1947	Bernie Naylor	South Fremantle	108 goals
1946	Bernie Naylor	South Fremantle	131 goals
1945	Bill Baker	West Perth	91 goals
1944	Alan Watts	East Perth	101 goals
1943	Robin Farmer	Claremont	97 goals
1942	Ted Brunton	West Perth	94 goals
1941	George Doig	East Fremantle	141 goals
1940	George Moloney	Claremont	129 goals
1939	Bert Gook	Perth	102 goals
1938	Ted Tyson	West Perth	126 goals
1937	George Doig	East Fremantle	144 goals
1936	George Doig	East Fremantle	109 goals
1935	George Doig	East Fremantle	113 goals
1934	George Doig	East Fremantle	152 goals
1933	George Doig	East Fremantle	106 goals
1932	Ted Tyson	West Perth	96 goals
1931	Doug Oliphant	Perth	84 goals
1930	Frank Hopkins	West Perth	79 goals
1929	Sol Lawn	South Fremantle	96 goals
1928	Sol Lawn	South Fremantle	75 goals
1927	Bonny Campbell	East Perth	87 goals
1926	Bonny Campbell	East Perth	89 goals
1925	Ted Flemming	West Perth	50 goals
1924	Bonny Campbell	East Perth	67 goals
1923	Dinney Coffey	East Fremantle	36 goals
1922	Bonny Campbell	South Fremantle	47 goals
1921	Allan Evans	Perth	64 goals
1920	Pat Rodriguez	Subiaco	36 goals
