= 1985 WAFL season =

Australian rules football season

- Teams: 8
- Premiers: East Fremantle; 26th premiership
- Minor premiers: East Fremantle; 30th minor premiership
- Sandover Medallist: Murray Wrensted (East Fremantle)
- Bernie Naylor Medallist: Mick Rea (Perth)
- Matches played: 88

The 1985 WAFL season was the 101st season of the West Australian Football League and its various incarnations. The season opened on 30 March and concluded on 21 September with the 1985 WAFL Grand Final contested between East Fremantle and Subiaco.

It was highlighted by the rise of Subiaco, who had nearly become extinct in the late 1970s due to financial problems and had won only 25.2 percent of its games between 1975 and 1984. The Lions recovered from a mid-season slump to win their last seven games before the finals – their longest winning streak in one season since 1915 – and challenge East Fremantle. The Sharks came off their 1984 Grand Final loss to win their first twelve on end, gain favourable comparisons with their unbeaten 1946 counterparts, and be quoted at odds of 25/1 to achieve a perfect season. The blue and whites sealed the minor premiership with four games remaining and defeated the Lions in a thrilling Grand Final.

Major declines occurred from Claremont, who had their worst season since 1977, and East Perth, who began a sequence of five seasons with only 24 wins, two wooden spoons (their first since 1964) and two last-round escapes. Perth, who had not played finals in any grade since the 1978 Grand Final, embarked upon their first significant recruiting campaign for a decade, acquiring dissatisfied South Fremantle coach Mal Brown, former Claremont goalsneak Brett Farmer, and future mainstays Mark Watson, Wayne Ryder and Willie Dick – but did not match expectations and rose just one position with one more win than in 1984.

Off the field, the season saw Perth businessmen Alan Delany and John Watts attempt to buy lowly VFL club St. Kilda and move them to Perth, which failed but was the first move towards the modern national Australian Football League, which began in earnest with the formation of the West Coast Eagles in 1987.

== Home-and-away season ==
=== Round 1 ===
	Round 1
Saturday, 30 March	West Perth 19.18 (132)	def.	South Fremantle 10.22 (82)	Leederville Oval (crowd: 8063)
Saturday, 30 March	Subiaco 19.17 (131)	def.	Perth 14.12 (96)	Subiaco Oval (crowd: 8034)
Saturday, 30 March	East Perth 11.11 (77)	def.	Claremont 8.15 (63)	Perth Oval (crowd: 5688)
Saturday, 30 March	East Fremantle 20.23 (143)	def.	Swan Districts 9.10 (64)	East Fremantle Oval (crowd: 7147)
East Fremantle, aided by new rover David Bushell and wingman Chris Mainwaring, dominate Swans with the pace and drive and confirm their status as premiership favourties.; Les Fong kicked nine goals in an amazing display of roving for the Falcons. He had never kicked more than five before and only 20 and 21 in the 1984 and 1983 seasons.

=== Round 2 ===
	Round 2
Saturday, 6 April	Perth 22.21 (153)	def.	East Perth 7.15 (57)	Leederville Oval (crowd: 9796)
Saturday, 6 April	South Fremantle 14.15 (99)	def. by	East Fremantle 23.28 (166)	Fremantle Oval (crowd: 10118)
Monday, 8 April	Swan Districts 19.14 (128)	def.	West Perth 15.12 (102)	Bassendean Oval (crowd: 10500)
Monday, 8 April	Claremont 10.18 (78)	def.	Subiaco 10.10 (70)	Claremont Oval (crowd: 5818)
Perth's new-found solidity in defence and seven goals from Rea after having been at Mines Rovers in Collie during late 1984 ensures the Demons' biggest victory since 1980 and second-biggest ever over the Royals.; A depleted Claremont side, whose returning captain-coach Moss gave Subiaco first use of the wind, comes back for a surprise win in wet conditions as Monteath and John Scott upset the balance of Subiaco's defence.

=== Round 3 ===
	Round 3
Saturday, 13 April	Subiaco 22.13 (145)	def.	West Perth 10.11 (71)	Subiaco Oval (crowd: 10211)
Saturday, 13 April	Perth 18.17 (125)	def.	South Fremantle 13.9 (87)	Lathlain Park (crowd: 9010)
Saturday, 13 April	Claremont 13.14 (92)	def. by	East Fremantle 16.15 (111)	Geraldton (crowd: 7970)
Saturday, 13 April	East Perth 14.16 (101)	def. by	Swan Districts 16.12 (108)	Bassendean Oval (crowd: 8827)
For the first time, the WAFL played a match in Geraldton, one of the largest country towns in WA.; Don Holmes' seven brilliant goals – three in the critical final quarter – wins a game where East Perth had the bulk of the play but capitalise poorly.

=== Round 4 ===
	Round 4
Saturday, 20 April	Subiaco 17.16 (118)	def.	South Fremantle 16.19 (115)	Subiaco Oval (crowd: 8196)
Saturday, 20 April	West Perth 27.17 (179)	def.	Perth 20.6 (126)	Leederville Oval (crowd: 8165)
Saturday, 20 April	Claremont 15.15 (105)	def.	Swan Districts 13.15 (93)	Claremont Oval (crowd: 7953)
Saturday, 20 April	East Fremantle 31.13 (199)	def.	East Perth 11.10 (76)	East Fremantle Oval (crowd: 7182)
Seven goals from rover Sean Regan – a member of a famous East Fremantle family and a cousin of teammate Gerard Neesham – gives East Fremantle a record win over the Royals after East Perth led by four points twenty minutes into the second quarter. East Fremantle then scored 15.2 (92) to two behinds in twenty minutes.

=== Round 5 ===
	Round 5
Saturday, 27 April	Swan Districts 13.21 (99)	def. by	Subiaco 22.14 (146)	Bassendean Oval (crowd: 9628)
Saturday, 27 April	West Perth 18.18 (126)	def.	East Perth 16.9 (105)	Subiaco Oval (crowd: 9160)
Saturday, 27 April	South Fremantle 24.19 (163)	def.	Claremont 10.12 (72)	Fremantle Oval (crowd: 6700)
Saturday, 27 April	Perth 15.12 (102)	def. by	East Fremantle 18.17 (125)	Lathlain Park (crowd: 7152)
Subiaco record their first win over Swan Districts since the same round of 1978, ending a run of twenty straight losses, the equal longest run by one club against another since 1958.; Laurie Keene kicks nine and Victorian recruit Stephen Sells five in the win; An unexpected move of key forward Colin Waterson onto the dangerous Rea gives East Fremantle an unexpected boon – the talented attacking player keeps Rea to one goal after half-time and ends Perth's hope of upsetting the pacesetters.; West Perth's "youth policy" and the resourcefulness of Fong ensures the Falcons win a fine match over a gallant East Perth as a special tribute to former stars John Wynne and Bill Dempsey.

=== Round 6 ===
	Round 6
Saturday, 4 May	Swan Districts 23.16 (154)	def. by	South Fremantle 17.17 (119)	Bassendean Oval (crowd: 7631)
Saturday, 4 May	East Perth 14.15 (99)	def. by	Subiaco 20.10 (130)	Fremantle Oval (crowd: 7505)
Saturday, 4 May	Perth 13.14 (92)	def. by	Claremont 18.15 (123)	Subiaco Oval (crowd: 5867)
Saturday, 4 May	East Fremantle 28.21 (189)	def.	West Perth 9.7 (61)	East Fremantle Oval (crowd: 6311)
Perth coach Mal Brown threatens to not pay his players as the Demons fall away from 32 points up near three-quarter time to lose by thirty-one.; East Fremantle kick an amazing 17.13 (115) to 1.4 (10) in the second half, including a WA(N)FL record 14.6 (90) in the final quarter – all without full-forward Darren Bennett and goalkicking rover Roger Kerr, plus having Colin Waterson absent from attack.

=== Round 7 ===
	Round 7
Saturday, 11 May	Perth 14.14 (98)	def. by	Swan Districts 27.18 (180)	Lathlain Park (crowd: 8178)
Saturday, 11 May	South Fremantle 34.18 (222)	def.	East Perth 15.3 (93)	Fremantle Oval (crowd: 6550)
Saturday, 11 May	West Perth 23.7 (145)	def.	Claremont 20.13 (133)	Leederville Oval (crowd: 7641)
Saturday, 11 May	Subiaco 12.13 (85)	def. by	East Fremantle 24.18 (162)	Subiaco Oval (crowd: 16709)
The crowd at Subiaco Oval is the record for a Subiaco home game there, and sees the Sharks stay undefeated with a comfortable win.; Future Geelong star Mark Bairstow, at a time when he is criticised for coming to Perth only to train and play, decimates East Perth who lose in all grades for the sixth week running and concede their highest-ever score.

=== Round 8 ===
	Round 8
Saturday, 18 May	South Fremantle 19.24 (138)	def.	West Perth 13.16 (94)	Fremantle Oval (crowd: 8880)
Saturday, 18 May	Perth 13.26 (104)	def. by	Subiaco 25.17 (167)	Lathlain Park (crowd: 5356)
Saturday, 18 May	Claremont 19.15 (129)	def.	East Perth 12.15 (87)	Claremont Oval (crowd: 5105)
Saturday, 18 May	Swan Districts 14.8 (92)	def. by	East Fremantle 23.20 (158)	Bassendean Oval (crowd: 16723)
East Fremantle's fine defence – with Browning completely blanketing Garry Sidebottom – and hard-running centreline gives an eighth straight victory with a percentage of 186.74 despite considerable Swan success tagging their prime movers.; The inaccuracy of Brett Farmer, Wiley and Bryan Cousins – who score 3.15 (33) between them with most misses being from close-in and Cousins the worst offender with 1.6 (12) – denies Perth an upset win in a match that leaves Lion coach Bunton very angry at his team's effort.

=== Round 9 ===
	Round 9
Saturday, 25 May	West Perth 15.13 (103)	def.	Subiaco 12.19 (91)	Leederville Oval (crowd: 9000)
Saturday, 25 May	Perth 17.20 (122)	def.	South Fremantle 12.16 (88)	Subiaco Oval (crowd: 7246)
Saturday, 25 May	Swan Districts 12.13 (128)	def.	East Perth 12.9 (81)	Bassendean Oval (crowd: 6966)
Saturday, 25 May	Claremont 12.10 (82)	def. by	East Fremantle 19.13 (127)	Claremont Oval (crowd: 8700)
East Fremantle kick an impressive 6.3 (39) to 2.3 (15) into a solid breeze during the final quarter to give suggestions an unbeaten season could be coming – besides maintaining an amazing record of 68 goals to 24 in final quarters so far in 1985. Claremont became the first team to outscore the Sharks in successive quarters, but Graham Moss, recalled at 35 to play centre half-forward, could not counter the East Fremantle defence.; A magnificent goal from Les Fong, who had been struggling since his brilliant first-up display, a fine debut at 25 from brother Neale, (Note: Better known as a member of the West Australian Football Commission and author of the "Fong Report" on the future of West Australian football after the 2000 season.) and thirty-two possessions from Corry Bewick ensure West Perth stay ahead of Subiaco all game and enter the four despite a bad percentage courtesy of the East Fremantle thrashing in Round 6.; Perth produce a gutsy effort with Adrian Barich playing throughout with a broken hand and Willie Dick suffering a persistent flu to win their first game for seven rounds.

=== Round 10 ===
	Round 10
Saturday, 1 June	West Perth 15.10 (100)	def. by	Swan Districts 15.22 (112)	Leederville Oval (crowd: 12784)
Saturday, 1 June	Subiaco 19.15 (129)	def.	Claremont 14.17 (101)	Subiaco Oval (crowd: 9111)
Monday, 3 June	East Perth 17.23 (125)	def.	Perth 11.14 (80)	Perth Oval (crowd: 8002)
Monday, 3 June	East Fremantle 21.12 (138)	def.	South Fremantle 13.11 (89)	East Fremantle Oval (crowd: 20287)
Michael Mitchell takes an amazing high mark over Greg Wilkinson that came to be regarded as the best mark in the WAFL for many years, but Subiaco recovers after the Tigers come back from 58 points down to take the lead early in the last quarter.

=== Round 11 ===
	Round 11
Saturday, 8 June	Subiaco 9.15 (69)	def. by	Swan Districts 14.10 (94)	Subiaco Oval (crowd: 11254)
Saturday, 8 June	Claremont 12.13 (85)	def. by	South Fremantle 16.9 (105)	Claremont Oval (crowd: 6149)
Saturday, 8 June	East Fremantle 21.21 (147)	def.	Perth 14.11 (95)	East Fremantle Oval (crowd: 6092)
Sunday, 9 June	West Perth 16.13 (109)	def. by	East Perth 18.18 (126)	Leederville Oval (crowd: 11948)

=== Round 12 ===
	Round 12
Saturday, 22 June	South Fremantle 19.19 (133)	def.	Subiaco 20.7 (127)	Fremantle Oval (crowd: 6442)
Saturday, 22 June	Perth 9.12 (66)	def. by	West Perth 23.18 (156)	Lathlain Park (crowd: 5086)
Saturday, 22 June	Swan Districts 11.10 (76)	def. by	Claremont 24.27 (171)	Bassendean Oval (crowd: 5971)
Saturday, 22 June	East Perth 12.9 (81)	def. by	East Fremantle 18.11 (119)	Perth Oval (crowd: 5984)
East Fremantle record their twelfth straight win, their best start since their perfect season of 1946 and exceeded since then only by Swan Districts in 1980, East Perth in 1959 and the great South Fremantle side of 1950; South Fremantle came back from a 39-point deficit to win thanks to several unusual moves and shutting down key Lion Laurie Keene, who kicked only one goal.; Motivation from former Warwickshire bowler Rudi Webster drives Clarement – led by recruits Peter Thorne from Melbourne and John Scott from East Perth to a flawlessly-played upset over the three-time premiers.

=== Round 13 ===
	Round 13
Saturday, 29 June	South Fremantle 28.15 (183)	def.	Swan Districts 16.11 (107)	Fremantle Oval (crowd: 7275)
Saturday, 29 June	Perth 22.13 (145)	def. by	Claremont 24.13 (157)	Lathlain Park (crowd: 3801)
Saturday, 29 June	West Perth 18.17 (125)	def.	East Fremantle 18.15 (123)	Subiaco Oval (crowd: 8358)
Sunday, 30 June	East Perth 9.12 (66)	def. by	Subiaco 19.18 (132)	Dampier (crowd: 6040)
For the first time, the WAFL plays a game in the Pilbara town of Dampier, an experiment repeated in 1989 and 2010.; With Dorotich kicking ten and Vigona six, South Fremantle demoralise the premiers after half-time, kicking 15.6 to 7.6 to be only a game out of the four with a superior percentage.

=== Round 14 ===
	Round 14
Saturday, 6 July	Swan Districts 25.15 (165)	def.	Perth 17.20 (123)	Bassendean Oval (crowd: 5867)
Saturday, 6 July	East Perth 21.15 (141)	def.	South Fremantle 14.17 (101)	Perth Oval (crowd: 6478)
Saturday, 6 July	Claremont 16.17 (113)	def.	West Perth 14.11 (94)	Claremont Oval (crowd: 8754)
Saturday, 6 July	East Fremantle 18.17 (125)	def.	Subiaco 8.6 (54)	East Fremantle Oval (crowd: 7247)
Colin Waterson's demolition of Keene ensures East Fremantle bounce back devastatingly from their first defeat as ex-Fitzroy player David Rankin moves from defence to be part of a dominating midfield.; East Perth exploit South Fremantle's weakness away from Fremantle Oval with a workmanlike win to move from last position.

=== Round 15 ===
	Round 15
Saturday, 13 July	West Perth 15.7 (97)	def.	South Fremantle 11.12 (78)	Leederville Oval (crowd: 4304)
Saturday, 13 July	Subiaco 15.15 (105)	def.	Perth 10.14 (74)	Subiaco Oval (crowd: 4056)
Saturday, 13 July	East Perth 13.11 (89)	def.	Claremont 9.15 (69)	Perth Oval (crowd: 3413)
Saturday, 13 July	East Fremantle 10.11 (71)	def. by	Swan Districts 12.13 (85)	East Fremantle Oval (crowd: 5025)
In Ron Alexander's three hundredth senior match, John Todd's interchanging of centre half-back Rance and injury plagued centre-half forward Peter Sartori breaks down the power Shark goal-to-goal line and the Swans are poised to threaten Subiaco's hold on second position.; With schoolteacher Glyn Williams returning to the team in an emergency despite little training, East Perth claim another significant scalp by beating an in-form Claremont in very wet conditions.

=== Round 16 ===
	Round 16
Saturday, 20 July	Swan Districts 22.12 (144)	def.	West Perth 21.16 (142)	Bassendean Oval (crowd: 9462)
Saturday, 20 July	Perth 26.14 (170)	def.	East Perth 13.10 (88)	Subiaco Oval (crowd: 5075)
Saturday, 20 July	Claremont 12.17 (89)	def. by	Subiaco 22.16 (148)	Claremont Oval (crowd: 5610)
Saturday, 20 July	South Fremantle 18.14 (122)	def. by	East Fremantle 20.15 (135)	Fremantle Oval (crowd: 10017)
The return of Warren Dean, after injury and abortive stints in defence and the ruck, allows the Lions to thrash Claremont in a fluctuating match where Claremont kick 8.6 (54) to 1.4 (10) after half-time before Subiaco pile on 11.7 (73) in the last quarter.; A brilliant display from Wayne Ryder, who combined with Mick Rea and Bryan Cousins for twenty goals, gives Perth a crushing win to keep a third straight wooden spoon in doubt.

=== Round 17 ===
	Round 17
Saturday, 27 July	Subiaco 16.18 (114)	def.	West Perth 10.9 (69)	Subiaco Oval (crowd: 7939)
Saturday, 27 July	Perth 14.15 (99)	def. by	South Fremantle 19.12 (126)	Lathlain Park (crowd: 4363)
Saturday, 27 July	East Perth 9.13 (67)	def. by	Swan Districts 15.14 (104)	Claremont Oval (crowd: 4593)
Saturday, 27 July	East Fremantle 10.13 (73)	def.	Claremont 9.6 (60)	East Fremantle Oval (crowd: 4802)

=== Round 18 ===
	Round 18
Saturday, 3 August	Subiaco 24.16 (160)	def.	South Fremantle 14.13 (97)	Subiaco Oval (crowd: 7548)
Saturday, 3 August	West Perth 26.13 (169)	def.	Perth 17.14 (116)	Leederville Oval (crowd: 4689)
Saturday, 3 August	Claremont 19.10 (124)	def.	Swan Districts 13.14 (92)	Claremont Oval (crowd: 4655)
Saturday, 3 August	East Fremantle 18.15 (123)	def.	East Perth 12.15 (87)	East Fremantle Oval (crowd: 4226)
With Moss reappointed as coach for 1986 and 1987, Claremont produce a fine win over Swan Districts to keep the pressure on West Perth in a scenario compared by the press with 1964 when the Tigers had won from fourth position.

=== Round 19 ===
	Round 19
Saturday, 10 August	Swan Districts 16.14 (110)	def. by	Subiaco 20.15 (135)	Bassendean Oval (crowd: 7154)
Saturday, 10 August	East Perth 16.16 (112)	def. by	West Perth 20.13 (133)	Perth Oval (crowd: 4886)
Saturday, 10 August	South Fremantle 13.13 (91)	def. by	Claremont 21.11 (137)	Fremantle Oval (crowd: 10774)
Saturday, 10 August	Perth 16.15 (111)	def. by	East Fremantle 19.18 (132)	Lathlain Park (crowd: 6774)
A crucial win for West Perth is marred by violent crowd behaviour whereby a group of West Perth supporters – known by the police beforehand as potentially dangerous – spit and hurl cartons of chocolate-flavoured milk at their East Perth counterparts.

=== Round 20 ===
	Round 20
Saturday, 17 August	Swan Districts 29.18 (192)	def.	South Fremantle 14.16 (100)	Bassendean Oval (crowd: 6333)
Saturday, 17 August	East Perth 12.10 (82)	def. by	Subiaco 31.14 (200)	Perth Oval (crowd: 5219)
Saturday, 17 August	Claremont 12.17 (89)	def. by	Perth 19.11 (125)	Claremont Oval (crowd: 4546)
Saturday, 17 August	East Fremantle 14.19 (103)	def. by	West Perth 18.22 (132)	East Fremantle Oval (crowd: 7883)
Perth record their first win over Claremont since the last round of 1978, ending a run of twenty straight losses that is Claremont's longest winning run over any club and Perth's longest losing run in open-age WA(N)FL football.; Subiaco kick their highest score against East Perth, beating their previous 1970 record by fifty-six points Keene is unstoppable and Leishwan and Sells each kick six goals.

=== Round 21 ===
	Round 21
Saturday, 24 August	Perth 17.9 (111)	def.	Swan Districts 13.17 (95)	Lathlain Park (crowd: 5325)
Saturday, 24 August	South Fremantle 17.22 (124)	def.	East Perth 12.11 (83)	Fremantle Oval (crowd: 3125)
Saturday, 24 August	West Perth 20.10 (130)	def.	Claremont 8.10 (58)	Leederville Oval (crowd: 5385)
Saturday, 24 August	Subiaco 19.11 (125)	def.	East Fremantle 15.15 (105)	Subiaco Oval (crowd: 9355)
A superb defence and a brilliant display by future Essendon star Darren Bewick leads West Perth to overrun Claremont.

== Ladder ==
1985 WAFL ladder
Pos	Team	Pld	W	L	D	PF	PA	PP	Pts
1	East Fremantle (P)	21	17	4	0	2774	1917	144.7	68
2	Subiaco	21	15	6	0	2581	2072	124.6	60
3	West Perth	21	12	9	0	2468	2402	102.7	48
4	Swan Districts	21	12	9	0	2379	2448	97.2	48
5	Claremont	21	9	12	0	2130	2263	94.1	36
6	South Fremantle	21	8	13	0	2462	2577	95.5	32
7	Perth	21	6	15	0	2332	2691	86.7	24
8	East Perth	21	5	16	0	1923	2679	71.8	20

Source: "1985 Ladder". WAFL Footy Facts.
Rules for classification: 1) points; 2) percentage; 3) number of points for.
(P) Premiers

== Finals series ==
=== First semi-final ===
	First semi-final
Saturday, 31 August	West Perth 19.12 (126)	def. by	Swan Districts 24.14 (158)	Subiaco Oval (crowd: 26,508)
An injury-crippled West Perth outfit fails to break its Swan Districts hoodoo as Garry Sidebottom kicks nine goals and the Falcons are never closer than eleven points after the first few minutes.

=== Second semi-final ===
	Second semi-final
Saturday, 7 September	East Fremantle 19.11 (125)	def.	Subiaco 16.17 (113)	Subiaco Oval (crowd: 23,500)
In a high-standard match, Subiaco, despite losing to a resurgent East Fremantle, lose no friends and escape injuries from their first final since 1974.

=== Preliminary final ===
	Preliminary final
Saturday, 14 September	Subiaco 20.13 (133)	def.	Swan Districts 11.16 (82)	Subiaco Oval (crowd: 25,708)
This was the first final Subiaco had won since the 1973 Grand Final, and ended Swan Districts' hat-trick of flags

=== Grand Final ===
1985 WAFL Grand Final
Saturday, 21 September	East Fremantle	def.	Subiaco	Subiaco Oval (crowd: 42,657)
3.1 (19); 9.7 (61); 12.9 (81); 15.12 (102)	Q1; Q2; Q3; Final	7.4 (46); 8.7 (55); 11.12 (78); 14.13 (97)	Umpires: David Johnson, Phil O'Reilly; Simpson Medal: Brian Taylor (Subiaco)
Browning 6, Wrensted 3, Wilson 2, Alexander, Peake, Neesham, Kerr	Goals	Sells 2, Mort 2, Spencer 2, Keene 2, Scott 2, Dean, Neil Taylor, Phil Lamb, Brian Taylor
Browning, Wrensted, Waterson, Neesham, Wilson, Mainwaring	Best	Dean, Featherby, Brian Taylor, Sells, Neil Taylor, Scott
Regarded as one of the best-ever WAFL Grand Finals, the inexperienced Subiaco team nearly topples a powerful East Fremantle combination in a thriller in showery conditions.
