= 1927 WAFL season =

Australian rules football season

- Teams: 7
- Premiers: East Perth; 7th premiership
- Minor premiers: East Perth; 7th minor premiership
- Sandover Medallist: Jim Craig (West Perth)
- Bernie Naylor Medallist: Bonny Campbell (East Perth)
- Matches played: 67

The 1927 WAFL season was the 43rd season of the West Australian Football League. It saw the last premiership of the East Perth dynasty dating back to the end of World War I, as mastermind coach Phil Matson was to be killed in a truck crash the following year and the Royals were to fall to a clear last in 1929 as most of their champions retired. Despite opening their permanent home ground at Claremont Oval, newcomers Claremont-Cottesloe showed little improvement on their debut season and again won only a single game. The most notable change in fortunes was from South Fremantle, who had their first season with more wins than losses since their last premiership in 1917, and extended Matson's Royals in the grand final.

VFL champions Collingwood became the second Victoria club to tour Perth after Fitzroy in 1922, and although an interstate carnival meant they were without several top players, the Magpies performed well enough to win one of their two matches against a representative team from those WAFL players not at the carnival.

== Home-and-away season ==
=== Round 1 ===
	Round 1
Saturday, 23 April (2:45 pm)	East Perth 18.11 (119)	def.	Claremont-Cottesloe 6.13 (49)	Perth Oval
Saturday, 23 April (2:45 pm)	South Fremantle 4.13 (37)	def.	Subiaco 5.5 (35)	Fremantle Oval
Saturday, 23 April (2:45 pm)	West Perth 9.10 (64)	def. by	Perth 14.14 (98)	Leederville Oval
	Bye; East Fremantle

=== Round 2 ===
	Round 2
Saturday, 30 April (2:45 pm)	Subiaco 8.12 (60)	def.	West Perth 7.10 (52)	Subiaco Oval
Saturday, 30 April (2:45 pm)	Claremont-Cottesloe 4.12 (36)	def. by	East Fremantle 19.10 (124)	Claremont Oval
Saturday, 30 April (2:45 pm)	South Fremantle 9.11 (65)	def.	Perth 8.12 (60)	Fremantle Oval
	Bye; East Perth
Claremont Oval is opened for WAFL football in the fledgling club’s second season, but the local team is thrashed by a systematic Old Easts combination.

=== Round 3 ===
	Round 3
Saturday, 7 May (2:45 pm)	East Perth 7.13 (55)	def.	West Perth 7.10 (52)	Perth Oval
Saturday, 7 May (2:45 pm)	South Fremantle 12.9 (81)	def.	East Fremantle 4.9 (33)	Fremantle Oval
Saturday, 7 May (2:45 pm)	Perth 11.7 (73)	def.	Claremont-Cottesloe 9.6 (60)	WACA
	Bye; Subiaco
In heavy rain, East Fremantle are unexpectedly thrashed by South Fremantle, with Sol Lawn and Campbell outstanding up forward.

=== Round 4 ===
	Round 4
Saturday, 14 May (2:45 pm)	Claremont-Cottesloe 16.13 (109)	def. by	Subiaco 16.18 (114)	Claremont Oval
Saturday, 14 May (2:45 pm)	West Perth 8.9 (57)	def. by	East Fremantle 13.18 (96)	Leederville Oval
Saturday, 14 May (2:45 pm)	South Fremantle 11.12 (78)	def. by	East Perth 13.10 (88)	Fremantle Oval
	Bye; Perth
For the first time in WAFL history, both teams score 100 points in a match, but Subiaco, coming off the bye, come back to scrape home despite being without key defenders Hamilton and Brophy.

=== Round 5 (Labour Day) ===
	Round 5
Wednesday, 18 May (2:45 pm)	East Perth 7.14 (56)	def. by	East Fremantle 15.11 (101)	Perth Oval
Wednesday, 18 May (2:45 pm)	South Fremantle 10.16 (76)	def.	West Perth 4.9 (33)	Fremantle Oval
Wednesday, 18 May (2:45 pm)	Subiaco 9.13 (67)	def.	Perth 8.9 (57)	Subiaco Oval
	Bye; Claremont-Cottesloe

=== Round 6 ===
	Round 6
Saturday, 21 May (2:45 pm)	Perth 9.7 (61)	def.	East Perth 8.12 (60)	WACA
Saturday, 21 May (2:45 pm)	East Fremantle 10.11 (71)	def.	Subiaco 8.13 (61)	Fremantle Oval
Saturday, 21 May (2:45 pm)	West Perth 14.16 (100)	def.	Claremont-Cottesloe 9.5 (59)	Leederville Oval
	Bye; South Fremantle

=== Round 7 ===
	Round 7
Saturday, 28 May (2:45 pm)	Subiaco 9.7 (61)	def. by	East Perth 9.17 (71)	Subiaco Oval
Saturday, 28 May (2:45 pm)	Claremont-Cottesloe 5.8 (38)	def. by	South Fremantle 16.20 (116)	Claremont Oval
Saturday, 28 May (2:45 pm)	East Fremantle 7.18 (60)	def.	Perth 8.4 (52)	Fremantle Oval
	Bye; West Perth
Sol Lawn kicks nine goals for South Fremantle, who are joined by Old Easts on top after Perth score only 1.2 (8) in the second half.

=== Round 8 ===
	Round 8
Saturday, 4 June (2:45 pm)	Claremont-Cottesloe 8.14 (62)	def. by	East Perth 18.16 (124)	Claremont Oval
Saturday, 4 June (2:45 pm)	Perth 11.6 (72)	def.	West Perth 8.6 (54)	WACA
Saturday, 4 June (2:45 pm)	Subiaco 7.11 (53)	def.	South Fremantle 6.11 (47)	Subiaco Oval
	Bye; East Fremantle
In wet conditions, eight goals by Evans gives Perth the game and keeps them within percentage of their first finals berth since 1920.

=== Round 9 (Foundation Day) ===
	Round 9
Monday, 6 June (2:45 pm)	East Fremantle 9.20 (74)	def.	Claremont-Cottesloe 6.19 (55)	Fremantle Oval
Monday, 6 June (2:45 pm)	Perth 10.8 (68)	def. by	South Fremantle 13.10 (88)	WACA
Monday, 6 June (2:45 pm)	West Perth 8.9 (57)	def. by	Subiaco 14.8 (92)	Leederville Oval
	Bye; East Perth

=== Round 10 ===
	Round 10
Saturday, 11 June (2:45 pm)	Claremont-Cottesloe 5.8 (38)	def. by	Perth 15.17 (107)	Claremont Oval
Saturday, 11 June (2:45 pm)	East Fremantle 4.16 (40)	def. by	South Fremantle 9.8 (62)	Fremantle Oval
Saturday, 11 June (2:45 pm)	West Perth 14.8 (92)	def.	East Perth 9.12 (66)	Leederville Oval
	Bye; Subiaco
West Perth, finalists in 1926, return to that season’s form after winning only one of their first eight matches, defeating the reigning premiers in slippery conditions.

=== Round 11 ===
	Round 11
Saturday, 18 June (2:45 pm)	East Perth 9.6 (60)	def.	South Fremantle 6.9 (45)	Perth Oval
Saturday, 18 June (2:45 pm)	East Fremantle 11.11 (77)	def. by	West Perth 12.11 (83)	Fremantle Oval
Saturday, 18 June (2:45 pm)	Subiaco 7.15 (57)	def. by	Claremont-Cottesloe 12.7 (79)	Subiaco Oval
	Bye; Perth
Claremont-Cottesloe, who had surprised Subiaco at their previous meeting only to lose narrowly, win their second WAFL match by making use of a violent wind in the first quarter and holding the Maroons in the second.

=== Round 12 ===
	Round 12
Saturday, 25 June (2:45 pm)	Perth 9.8 (62)	def. by	Subiaco 11.10 (76)	WACA
Saturday, 25 June (2:45 pm)	West Perth 7.13 (55)	def.	South Fremantle 5.6 (36)	Leederville Oval
Saturday, 25 June (2:45 pm)	East Fremantle 9.10 (64)	def. by	East Perth 13.9 (87)	Fremantle Oval
	Bye; Claremont-Cottesloe
With Campbell kicking seven goals, East Perth move to equal top position as the Cardinals continue their revival, defeating a seventeen-man South Fremantle team.

=== Round 13 ===
	Round 13
Saturday, 2 July (2:45 pm)	Subiaco 10.14 (74)	def.	East Fremantle 10.10 (70)	Subiaco Oval
Saturday, 2 July (2:45 pm)	East Perth 11.10 (76)	def.	Perth 9.9 (63)	Perth Oval
Saturday, 2 July (2:45 pm)	Claremont-Cottesloe 6.14 (50)	def. by	West Perth 13.8 (86)	Claremont Oval
	Bye; South Fremantle

=== Round 14 ===
	Round 14
Saturday, 9 July (2:45 pm)	Perth 14.12 (96)	def.	East Fremantle 8.11 (59)	WACA
Saturday, 9 July (2:45 pm)	South Fremantle 9.9 (63)	def.	Claremont-Cottesloe 5.5 (35)	Fremantle Oval
Saturday, 9 July (2:45 pm)	East Perth 5.13 (43)	def.	Subiaco 5.11 (41)	Perth Oval
	Bye; West Perth
Following this round, WAFL football was suspended for an interstate match in Adelaide.

=== Round 15 ===
	Round 15
Saturday, 23 July (2:45 pm)	West Perth 7.11 (53)	def. by	Perth 10.16 (76)	Leederville Oval
Saturday, 23 July (2:45 pm)	Claremont-Cottesloe 9.13 (67)	def. by	East Perth 17.19 (121)	Claremont Oval
Saturday, 23 July (2:45 pm)	South Fremantle 7.16 (58)	def.	Subiaco 7.9 (51)	Fremantle Oval
	Bye; East Fremantle
Following Perth’s win over the Cardinals, umpire Les Trotter was attacked physically by an angry spectator who failed to get the better of him, and police were required to break up the fight. The WAFL did not take further actions.

=== Round 16 ===
	Round 16
Saturday, 30 July (2:45 pm)	East Fremantle 10.12 (72)	def.	Claremont-Cottesloe 8.8 (56)	Fremantle Oval
Saturday, 30 July (2:45 pm)	Perth 7.19 (61)	def.	South Fremantle 5.6 (36)	WACA
Saturday, 30 July (2:45 pm)	Subiaco 11.13 (79)	def.	West Perth 9.7 (61)	Subiaco Oval
	Bye; East Perth
In difficult conditions on a wet and boisterous day, regular Maroon ruckman Outridge is a match-winner in attack with seven goals.

=== Round 17 ===
	Round 17
Saturday, 6 August (2:45 pm)	East Perth 12.11 (83)	def.	West Perth 12.9 (81)	Perth Oval
Saturday, 6 August (2:45 pm)	East Fremantle 8.12 (60)	def.	South Fremantle 7.7 (49)	Fremantle Oval
Saturday, 6 August (2:45 pm)	Perth 10.15 (75)	def.	Claremont-Cottesloe 10.13 (73)	WACA
	Bye; Subiaco
The leading clubs were without their State players for this and the following round due to the 1927 Melbourne Carnival.; Three close games see East Perth in a high-speed encounter end West Perth’s hopes, whilst a vicious match sees East Fremantle reduce their chance of missing finals action for the first time in twelve seasons.

=== Round 18 ===
	Round 18
Saturday, 13 August (2:45 pm)	East Fremantle 10.12 (72)	def.	West Perth 8.9 (57)	Fremantle Oval
Saturday, 13 August (2:45 pm)	East Perth 9.15 (69)	def.	South Fremantle 7.2 (44)	Perth Oval
Saturday, 13 August (2:45 pm)	Subiaco 14.13 (97)	def.	Claremont-Cottesloe 9.3 (57)	Subiaco Oval
	Bye; Perth
With all clubs depleted by Carnival commitments, the standard of play is regarded as poor, but East Perth, without eight regulars but with veterans "Digger" Thomas and Brentnall the best players afield, virtually seal the minor premiership with three rounds to play.

=== Collingwood Tour ===
==== First State Match ====
West Australian Football League v Collingwood
Wednesday, 17 August (2:45 pm)	Western Australia	def. by	Collingwood	Subiaco Oval
2.4 (16); 2.7 (19); 5.11 (41); 7.12 (54)	Q1; Q2; Q3; Final	3.1 (19); 6.6 (42); 7.8 (50); 13.9 (87)	Umpires: Frank Collins
Hopkins 2, Joe Campbell 2, Holt, Gepp, Lawn	Goals	Harry Collier 5, Muir 2, Murphy 2, Beveridge 2, Harris, Makeham
Grigg, Matson, Gepp, Donovan, Donoghue, Piper, Duffy	Best	Harry Collier, Harris, Murphy, Beveridge, Milburn, Makeham, Poulter, Wescott, Romney
Despite the absence of Syd and Gordon Coventry, Collingwood demonstrate their power with a convincing victory in tough conditions.

==== Second State Match ====
West Australian Football League v Collingwood
Saturday, 22 August (2:45 pm)	Western Australia	def.	Collingwood	Subiaco Oval
3.2 (20); 8.6 (54); 9.7 (61); 12.8 (80)	Q1; Q2; Q3; Final	2.2 (14); 2.4 (16); 7.8 (50); 8.10 (58)	Umpires: Frank Collins
Metherell 9, Steward, Gepp, Campbell	Goals	Ross 2, Rumney 2, Harry Collier 2, Shanahan, Libbis, Beveridge
Holt (best on ground), Duffy, Grigg, Metherell, Matson, Donoghue, Piper	Best	Rumney, Westcott, Wilson, Libbis, Harris, Millburn
The local team, with a number of changes, gains revenge for its mid-week defeat.

=== Round 19 ===
	Round 19
Saturday, 27 August (2:45 pm)	Perth 6.18 (54)	def. by	Subiaco 14.10 (94)	WACA
Saturday, 27 August (2:45 pm)	South Fremantle 9.11 (65)	drew with	West Perth 9.11 (65)	Subiaco Oval
Saturday, 27 August (2:45 pm)	East Fremantle 10.10 (70)	def.	East Perth 8.7 (55)	Fremantle Oval
	Bye; Claremont-Cottesloe
Perth fall from second to fifth with their loss on a waterlogged WACA.

=== Round 20 ===
	Round 20
Saturday, 3 September (2:45 pm)	Subiaco 11.9 (75)	def. by	East Fremantle 11.10 (76)	Subiaco Oval
Saturday, 3 September (2:45 pm)	East Perth 17.10 (112)	def.	Perth 8.10 (58)	Perth Oval
Saturday, 3 September (2:45 pm)	West Perth 10.12 (72)	def.	Claremont-Cottesloe 9.10 (64)	Leederville Oval
	Bye; South Fremantle
East Fremantle’s thrilling fight to hold of Subiaco in front of a large crowd and Perth’s loss virtually seals the top four with South playing Claremont-Cottesloe.

=== Round 21 ===
	Round 21
Saturday, 10 September (2:45 pm)	Subiaco 11.10 (76)	def. by	East Perth 12.5 (77)	Leederville Oval
Saturday, 10 September (2:45 pm)	Claremont-Cottesloe 8.8 (56)	def. by	South Fremantle 13.15 (93)	Claremont Oval
Saturday, 10 September (2:45 pm)	East Fremantle 8.16 (64)	def. by	Perth 16.11 (107)	Fremantle Oval
	Bye; West Perth
Perth’s 10.3 (63) first quarter was the highest in the WAFL to that point and ended the most recent run of over 100 games conceding under 100 points.

== Ladder ==
1927 WAFL ladder
Pos	Team	Pld	W	L	D	PF	PA	PP	Pts
1	East Perth (P)	18	14	4	0	1422	1165	122.1	56
2	East Fremantle	18	11	7	0	1283	1199	107.0	44
3	South Fremantle	18	10	7	1	1139	960	118.6	42
4	Subiaco	18	10	8	0	1263	1138	111.0	40
5	Perth	18	10	8	0	1300	1199	108.4	40
6	West Perth	18	6	11	1	1174	1276	92.0	26
7	Claremont-Cottesloe	18	1	17	0	1043	1687	61.8	4

Rules for classification: 1) points; 2) percentage; 3) number of points for.
(P) Premiers

== Finals ==
=== First semi-final ===
	First semi-final
Saturday, 17 September (2:45 pm)	South Fremantle 11.13 (79)	def.	East Fremantle 11.5 (71)	Fremantle Oval (crowd: 7,665)
South Fremantle come back to win a high-standard match with four goals in the last sixteen minutes.

=== Second semi-final ===
	Second semi-final
Saturday, 24 September (2:45 pm)	East Perth 11.11 (77)	def.	Subiaco 6.15 (51)	Leederville Oval (crowd: 11,049)
An eagerly awaited match proves disappointing as East Perth have no trouble winning.

=== Final ===
	Final
Saturday, 1 October (2:45 pm)	East Perth 9.12 (66)	def. by	South Fremantle 12.9 (81)	Subiaco Oval (crowd: 10,854)
South Fremantle force a challenge final with their ruck superiority led by the unheralded Sunderland, Fuhrmann and Holt.

=== Grand Final ===
1927 WAFL Grand Final
Saturday, 8 October (2:45 pm)	East Perth	def.	South Fremantle	Subiaco Oval (crowd: 15,714)
3.4 (22); 4.6 (30); 8.8 (56); 10.12 (72)	Q1; Q2; Q3; Final	1.1 (7); 4.6 (30); 6.8 (44); 7.9 (51)	Umpires: Frank O‘Connor
Bonny Campbell 5, "Digger" Thomas, Western, Owens, Sparrow, Fletcher	Goals	Lawn 3, Staton, McGuiness, Johnny Campbell, Harris
Glew, O‘Meara, Bonny Campbell, Fletcher, Duffy,	Best	McGuiness (best on ground), Johnny Campbell, Fuhrmann, Holt, Mahon
East Perth rebound to win their seventh flag in nine seasons, and the last before Matson’s death and the retirement of longstanding stars ends a dynasty.
