= 1954 WANFL season =

Australian rules football season

- Teams: 8
- Premiers: South Fremantle; 8th premiership
- Minor premiers: East Fremantle; 26th minor premiership
- Sandover Medallist: Merv McIntosh; Perth
- Matches played: 84
- Highest: 36,098 (Grand Final, East Fremantle vs. South Fremantle)

The 1954 WANFL season was the 70th season of the most prestigious Australian rules football state competition in Western Australia. Eight teams competed in the league, the same as the previous twelve seasons. The season began with the first home-and-away round played on Saturday, 24 April, and concluded with the 1954 WANFL Grand Final on Saturday, 9 October. South Fremantle defeated minor premiers East Fremantle by 78 points, marking the club's 8th premiership and third in succession.

== Premiership season ==
=== Round 1 ===
	Round 1
Saturday, 24 April (12:00 pm)	Swan Districts 13.12 (90)	def.	Subiaco 10.11 (71)	Bassendean Oval
Saturday, 24 April (12:00 pm)	Perth 12.10 (82)	def. by	South Fremantle 20.14 (134)	WACA Ground (crowd: 5,093)
Saturday, 24 April (12:00 pm)	East Fremantle 18.8 (116)	def.	West Perth 9.10 (64)	East Fremantle Oval (crowd: 3,875)
Saturday, 24 April (12:00 pm)	East Perth 10.7 (67)	def. by	Claremont 14.15 (99)	Perth Oval (crowd: 4,140)
Subiaco were hampered by the loss of captain and star rover Don Carter to an early injury, going down to Swan Districts by 19 points. Swans ruckman Wally Sidebottom was best on ground, while captain-coach Frank Sparrow and Victorian recruit Colin Henderson also played well. Promising for the Lions was the performance of recruits Laurie Kettlewell (a future Hall of Famer) and rover Brian Burke.; Reigning premiers South Fremantle withstood three tough quarters from Perth to run out comfortable winners at the WACA after kicking four goals to none in the last term. Star full-forward Bernie Naylor was unusually wayward in front of goal (with 5 goals 6 behinds), while Don Dixon and Tony Parentich were probably Souths' best players on the day. Dave Browning (also with 5 goals) was rated best for the Demons, with Jeff McGann, Cliff Noble and Merv McIntosh also standing out.

=== Round 2 ===
	Round 2
Saturday, 1 May (12:00 pm)	West Perth 5.11 (41)	def. by	Perth 7.18 (60)	Leederville Oval (crowd: 5,585)
Saturday, 1 May (12:00 pm)	Subiaco 11.12 (78)	def. by	East Perth 15.11 (101)	Subiaco Oval (crowd: 2,029)
Saturday, 1 May (12:00 pm)	Claremont 15.12 (102)	def.	Swan Districts 11.9 (75)	Claremont Oval (crowd: 3,244)
Saturday, 1 May (12:00 pm)	South Fremantle 7.17 (59)	def. by	East Fremantle 11.7 (73)	Fremantle Oval (crowd: 8,975)
In the 174th edition of the Fremantle Derby, South Fremantle were outmuscled and outhustled in a disciplined team performance from East Fremantle. Losing champion rover Steve Marsh to a badly bruised leg early was a significant blow, but in general the Bulldogs were well below their best. Sharks centre-forward Ken Holt backed up his previous week's haul with five goals as the Sharks won by 14 points.

=== Round 3 ===
	Round 3
Saturday, 8 May (12:00 pm)	Swan Districts 11.12 (78)	def.	South Fremantle 9.10 (64)	Bassendean Oval (crowd: 2,399)
Saturday, 8 May (12:00 pm)	East Perth 4.11 (35)	def. by	West Perth 15.10 (100)	Perth Oval (crowd: 5,869)
Saturday, 8 May (12:00 pm)	Perth 12.13 (85)	def.	Subiaco 6.11 (47)	WACA Ground (crowd: 2,286)
Saturday, 8 May (12:00 pm)	East Fremantle 21.12 (138)	def. by	Claremont 6.14 (50)	East Fremantle Oval (crowd: 8,532)

=== Round 4 ===
	Round 4
Saturday, 15 May (12:00 pm)	Subiaco 10.5 (65)	def. by	South Fremantle 23.23 (161)	Subiaco Oval (crowd: 2,137)
Saturday, 15 May (12:00 pm)	Perth 6.19 (55)	def. by	Swan Districts 8.19 (67)	WACA Ground (crowd: 7,507)
Saturday, 15 May (12:00 pm)	Claremont 5.19 (49)	def. by	West Perth 15.16 (106)	Claremont Oval (crowd: 4,751)
Saturday, 15 May (12:00 pm)	East Fremantle 10.13 (73)	def.	East Perth 10.9 (69)	East Fremantle Oval (crowd: 3,765)

=== Round 5 ===
	Round 5
Saturday, 22 May (12:00 pm)	West Perth 17.17 (119)	def.	Subiaco 6.8 (44)	Leederville Oval (crowd: 1,378)
Saturday, 22 May (12:00 pm)	East Perth 16.12 (108)	def.	Perth 16.4 (100)	Subiaco Oval (crowd: 2,103)
Saturday, 22 May (12:00 pm)	South Fremantle 23.18 (156)	def.	Claremont 5.6 (36)	Fremantle Oval (crowd: 2,185)
Saturday, 22 May (12:00 pm)	Swan Districts 5.13 (43)	def. by	East Fremantle 7.12 (54)	Bassendean Oval (crowd: 3,826)

== Ladder ==
1954 ladder
Pos	Team	Pld	W	L	D	PF	PA	PP	Pts
1	East Fremantle	20	15	5	0	1642	1119	146.7	60
2	West Perth	20	15	5	0	1676	1258	133.2	60
3	South Fremantle (P)	20	14	6	0	2056	1396	147.3	56
4	Perth	20	10	10	0	1609	1545	104.1	40
5	East Perth	20	8	12	0	1556	1785	87.2	32
6	Claremont	20	8	12	0	1506	1859	81.0	32
7	Swan Districts	20	6	14	0	1294	1796	72.0	24
8	Subiaco	20	4	16	0	1237	1818	68.0	16

Source: WAFL Footy Facts
Rules for classification: 1) points; 2) percentage; 3) number of points for.
(P) Premiers

== Grand final ==
1954 WANFL Grand Final
Saturday, 9 October (12:00 pm)	East Fremantle	def. by	South Fremantle	Subiaco Oval (crowd: 36,098)
6.3; 7.4; 8.5; 9.8 (62)	Q1; Q2; Q3; Final	3.1; 8.7; 15.11; 21.14 (140)	Umpires: Frank Wood; Simpson Medal: Charlie Tyson (South Fremantle)
