= Ben Saunders (Australian footballer) =

Australian rules footballer

Personal information
- Full name: Ben Saunders
- Born: 25 December 1991 (age 34)
- Original team: Mt Barker FC
- Height: 187 cm (6 ft 2 in)
- Weight: 92 kg (203 lb)
- Position: Forward

Club information
- Current club: South Fremantle Football Club

Playing career^{1}
Years	Club	Games (Goals)
2011	Claremont	5 (8)
2012– 2018	South Fremantle	109 (287)
- ^{1} Playing statistics correct to the end of 2016.

Career highlights
- Bernie Naylor Medal winner 2012, 2014, 2016; Simpson Medal (state game) 2017

Ben Saunders (born 25 December 1991) was an Australian rules footballer who played for South Fremantle in the West Australian Football League (WAFL). He was the club's leading goalkicker in 2012, 2014 and 2016. He won the Bernie Naylor Medal in 2012, 2014 and 2016, and the state game Simpson Medal in 2017.
