= Austin Robertson Jr. =

Australian rules footballer (1943–2023)

Personal information
- Full name: Austin Christopher Robertson
- Nickname: Ocker
- Born: 28 April 1943; North Perth, Western Australia
- Died: 22 August 2023 (aged 80)
- Height: 182 cm (6 ft 0 in)
- Weight: 83 kg (183 lb)
- Position: Forward

Playing career^{1}
Years	Club	Games (Goals)
1962–65, 1967–74	Subiaco	251 (1212)
1966	South Melbourne	18 (60)
Total		269 (1272)

Representative team honours^{2}
Years	Team	Games (Goals)
1963–71	Western Australia	10 (44)
- ^{1} Playing statistics correct to the end of 1966.^{2} Representative statistics correct as of 1971.

Career highlights
- Australian Football Hall of Fame inductee 2015; Subiaco premiership player 1973; WAFL leading goalkicker 1962, 1964, 1965, 1968–72; Subiaco leading goalkicker 1962–65, 1967–74; Subiaco best and fairest 1965, 1968; South Melbourne leading goalkicker 1966; Subiaco Team of the Century (full-forward)

Austin Christopher Robertson (28 April 1943 – 22 August 2023) was an Australian rules footballer who played with South Melbourne in the Victorian Football League (VFL) and Subiaco in the Western Australian National Football League (WANFL). He was the son of South Melbourne player Austin Robertson senior.

Robertson was a full forward, and by the time he retired in 1974 he had amassed a WANFL record goal tally of 1212 goals, as well as topping the WANFL goalkicking a record eight times (previous best of six by George Doig and Bernie Naylor) and kicked over 100 goals in a season six times.

Robertson was also a premiership player with Subiaco in 1973, which was the only Grand Final of his career.

While playing for Subiaco he averaged 4.83 goals a game, being held goalless in a match only five times, two of which were in his final season when he was affected by injury and in 1968, kicked 162 goals. He spent a season with his father's club South Melbourne in 1966, kicking 60 goals in 18 games, which won the club's goalkicking for the year.

Overall, Robertson played 269 premiership games and kicked 1272 goals in his career, the fourth highest total in elite Australian rules football history.

Robertson also kicked 44 goals in ten interstate football matches for Western Australia, and four goals in a night series match for South Melbourne (these are recognised as senior by the WAFL but not the VFL/AFL); if these are considered, then Robertson played 280 senior career matches and kicked 1320 senior career goals, the fifth highest total in Australian rules elite football history. The VFL/AFL lists Robertson's total as 279 senior career matches and 1316 senior career goals, excluding his night series match for South Melbourne.

Robertson also kicked 16 goals in four WANFL reserves matches, kicked 70 goals in 14 WANFL Colts (Under-19s) matches, and kicked 199 goals in 23 inter-school matches for Scotch College in 1958-1960: if these are considered, then he played 321 overall career games and kicked 1605 overall career goals, including 269 overall career games and 1298 overall career goals across the WANFL in seniors, reserves and Colts matches.

After his football career ended, Robertson was employed by businessman Kerry Packer and was one of the central figures in the establishment of World Series Cricket in 1977. Robertson subsequently managed many of Australia's leading cricketers over a period of 30 years, including Shane Warne.

Robertson was inducted into the Australian Football Hall of Fame in 2015.

Austin Robertson Jr. died on 22 August 2023, at the age of 80.
