= 1973 WANFL season =

Australian rules football season

- Teams: 8
- Premiers: Subiaco; 5th premiership
- Minor premiers: Subiaco; 6th minor premiership
- Sandover Medallist: Barry Cable (Perth)
- Leading goalkicker: Phil Smith (West Perth)
- Matches played: 88

The 1973 WANFL season was the 89th season of the Western Australian National Football League. It is most famous for Subiaco breaking the longest premiership drought in the history of the competition, winning for the first time since 1924 after having been a chopping block for most of the middle third of the century. Under the coaching of former St Kilda champion Ross Smith, the Lions, as they became christened in July, bounced back from two disappointing seasons to lose only two of their final sixteen home-and-away games for their first minor premiership since 1935, then in a low-scoring Grand Final comfortably defeated a much more hardened West Perth team.

In addition to Subiaco's premiership win, veteran goal machine Austin Robertson, Jr. broke Ted Tyson's record for most goals in a WANFL career late in the home-and-away season.

The season also saw 1972 Grand Finalists Claremont suffer the worst single-season fall in WAFL history, from only three losses to only four wins despite being pre-season premiership favourites, as Essendon's century goalkicker Geoff Blethyn proved an inadequate trade for champion ruckman Graham Moss. Eight losses by under two goals sunk Claremont further. Despite exceptional form from Barry Cable in his last season with the club, Perth also fell from preliminary finalists to their worst record for thirty-two seasons of only six wins. Perennial battlers Swan Districts looked like a first finals berth since 1965 during the autumn but won only two of their last thirteen matches as a rainy winter negated the strength in marking that won Swans their early victories.

== Home-and-away season ==
=== Round 1 ===
	Round 1
Saturday, 7 April	Subiaco 16.11 (107)	def.	Swan Districts 13.7 (85)	Subiaco Oval (crowd: 8653)
Saturday, 7 April	East Perth 15.8 (98)	def.	West Perth 13.10 (88)	Perth Oval (crowd: 11801)
Saturday, 7 April	Claremont 14.12 (96)	def. by	Perth 14.14 (98)	Claremont Oval (crowd: 10000)
Saturday, 7 April	East Fremantle 15.14 (104)	def.	South Fremantle 14.19 (103)	East Fremantle Oval (crowd: 11000)
Perth hang on to win despite Tiger recruit Blethyn kicking a controversial last-quarter "soccer" goal that Demon defender Richard Peel believed he kicked himself.

=== Round 2 ===
	Round 2
Saturday, 14 April	South Fremantle 13.13 (91)	def. by	East Perth 18.25 (133)	Fremantle Oval (crowd: 10060)
Saturday, 14 April	Perth 13.10 (88)	def.	Subiaco 12.12 (84)	Lathlain Park (crowd: 9778)
Saturday, 14 April	Swan Districts 18.14 (122)	def.	Claremont 9.13 (67)	Bassendean Oval (crowd: 10000)
Saturday, 14 April	West Perth 15.15 (105)	def.	East Fremantle 8.13 (61)	Leederville Oval (crowd: 9765)
Swan Districts, after a clean-out by coach Jack Ensor, lead the Tigers 17.9 (111) to 4.9 (33) after three quarters.

=== Round 3 (Easter weekend) ===
	Round 3
Saturday, 21 April	Claremont 9.15 (69)	def. by	West Perth 12.14 (86)	Claremont Oval (crowd: 12498)
Saturday, 21 April	Swan Districts 14.14 (98)	def.	East Fremantle 11.15 (81)	Bassendean Oval (crowd: 13000)
Monday, 23 April	South Fremantle 21.10 (136)	def.	Subiaco 12.15 (87)	Fremantle Oval (crowd: 8553)
Monday, 23 April	East Perth 14.11 (95)	def.	Perth 12.15 (87)	Perth Oval (crowd: 12750)
Thirty-two-year-old Peter Seinor leads South Fremantle to a convincing win, along with ten-goal forward Peter Troode.

=== Round 4 ===
	Round 4
Saturday, 28 April	Swan Districts 26.15 (171)	def.	South Fremantle 15.13 (103)	Bassendean Oval (crowd: 10220)
Saturday, 28 April	Perth 9.14 (68)	def. by	West Perth 10.11 (71)	Lathlain Park (crowd: 11115)
Saturday, 28 April	Subiaco 18.13 (121)	def.	East Perth 10.12 (72)	Subiaco Oval (crowd: 8770)
Saturday, 28 April	East Fremantle 12.21 (93)	def.	Claremont 13.12 (90)	East Fremantle Oval (crowd: 8640)
Swan Districts kick their highest-ever second quarter score and the highest for that quarter at Bassendean Oval.

=== Round 5 ===
	Round 5
Saturday, 5 May	West Perth 14.11 (95)	def.	Subiaco 8.13 (61)	Leederville Oval (crowd: 10050)
Saturday, 5 May	East Perth 14.8 (92)	def.	Swan Districts 9.7 (61)	Perth Oval (crowd: 15587)
Saturday, 5 May	Claremont 9.19 (73)	def.	South Fremantle 6.9 (45)	Claremont Oval (crowd: 7898)
Saturday, 5 May	East Fremantle 12.8 (80)	def.	Perth 10.17 (77)	East Fremantle Oval (crowd: 7404)
With John Lewis brilliant at full-back, Claremont kick 9.17 (71) to 2.6 (18) after the first 22 minutes to with their first game in slippery conditions.

=== Round 6 ===
	Round 6
Saturday, 12 May	Swan Districts 7.20 (62)	def.	West Perth 9.5 (59)	Bassendean Oval (crowd: 8000)
Saturday, 12 May	South Fremantle 16.14 (110)	def.	Perth 14.11 (95)	Fremantle Oval (crowd: 4679)
Saturday, 12 May	East Perth 16.12 (108)	def.	Claremont 13.7 (85)	Perth Oval (crowd: 5983)
Saturday, 12 May	Subiaco 11.21 (87)	def.	East Fremantle 8.6 (54)	Subiaco Oval (crowd: 4564)
Swan Districts became the first club to win a match with two fewer goals since East Perth did so in the last round of 1961 against South Fremantle.; The Swans hold West Perth out into a five-goal breeze after the Cardinals kick a goal in the opening minute, kicking 0.4 (4) to 0.3 (3) with stars Walker, Nowotny and Ron Boucher dominating.

=== Round 7 ===
	Round 7
Saturday, 19 May	West Perth 15.15 (105)	def.	South Fremantle 12.14 (86)	Leederville Oval (crowd: 10523)
Saturday, 19 May	Perth 14.11 (95)	def. by	Swan Districts 20.16 (136)	Lathlain Park (crowd: 12933)
Saturday, 19 May	Claremont 12.10 (82)	def. by	Subiaco 13.11 (89)	Claremont Oval (crowd: 9320)
Saturday, 19 May	East Fremantle 13.14 (92)	def. by	East Perth 23.20 (158)	East Fremantle Oval (crowd: 8982)
Injuries to Vernon Orr, David Mile and fullback John Lewis (who was thrashing Austin Robertson, Jr. and threatening to keep him goalless for the first time since 1965) deny Claremont a win despite playing their best football of the season.

=== Round 8 ===
	Round 8
Saturday, 26 May	East Perth 23.13 (151)	def.	South Fremantle 16.19 (115)	Perth Oval (crowd: 10178)
Saturday, 26 May	Subiaco 18.17 (125)	def.	Perth 7.7 (49)	Subiaco Oval (crowd: 9049)
Saturday, 26 May	Claremont 17.11 (113)	def. by	Swan Districts 17.20 (122)	Claremont Oval (crowd: 9000)
Saturday, 26 May	East Fremantle 17.11 (113)	def.	West Perth 9.16 (70)	East Fremantle Oval (crowd: 8714)

=== Round 9 ===
	Round 9
Saturday, 2 June	Swan Districts 7.8 (50)	def. by	Subiaco 15.16 (106)	Bassendean Oval (crowd: 10050)
Saturday, 2 June	West Perth 15.11 (101)	def.	East Perth 9.12 (66)	Leederville Oval (crowd: 10249)
Saturday, 2 June	Perth 13.12 (90)	def. by	Claremont 16.9 (105)	Lathlain Park (crowd: 6431)
Saturday, 2 June	South Fremantle 19.13 (127)	def.	East Fremantle 8.16 (64)	Fremantle Oval (crowd: 9148)

=== Round 10 ===
	Round 10
Saturday, 9 June	Subiaco 10.13 (73)	def.	South Fremantle 5.11 (41)	Subiaco Oval (crowd: 6694)
Saturday, 9 June	Perth 11.12 (78)	def.	East Perth 10.6 (66)	Lathlain Park (crowd: 5245)
Saturday, 9 June	West Perth 8.13 (61)	def.	Claremont 5.8 (38)	Leederville Oval (crowd: 6697)
Saturday, 9 June	East Fremantle 12.11 (83)	def.	Swan Districts 9.6 (60)	East Fremantle Oval (crowd: 5656)
Barry Cable has an astonishing 44 kicks and 11 handballs as Perth end their worst losing run since 1945 over the top-placed reigning premiers.; West Perth full-forward Phil Smith kicks 6.2 in heavy rain to win the match on his own and deliver "the final nail in Claremont's coffin".

=== Round 11 ===
	Round 11
Saturday, 16 June	South Fremantle 17.17 (119)	def.	Swan Districts 8.13 (61)	Fremantle Oval (crowd: 5860)
Saturday, 16 June	West Perth 12.12 (84)	def.	Perth 7.15 (57)	Leederville Oval (crowd: 6478)
Saturday, 16 June	East Perth 6.19 (55)	def. by	Subiaco 8.11 (59)	Perth Oval (crowd: 9880)
Saturday, 16 June	Claremont 16.13 (109)	def. by	East Fremantle 18.11 (119)	Claremont Oval (crowd: 5465)

=== Round 12 ===
	Round 12
Saturday, 23 June	Subiaco 10.7 (67)	def. by	West Perth 13.10 (88)	Subiaco Oval (crowd: 13357)
Saturday, 23 June	Swan Districts 7.14 (56)	def. by	East Perth 14.16 (100)	Bassendean Oval (crowd: 8191)
Saturday, 23 June	South Fremantle 12.12 (84)	def.	Claremont 6.10 (46)	Fremantle Oval (crowd: 7779)
Saturday, 23 June	Perth 11.12 (78)	def. by	East Fremantle 14.16 (100)	Lathlain Park (crowd: 6281)

=== Round 13 ===
	Round 13
Saturday, 30 June	West Perth 9.18 (72)	def.	Swan Districts 8.6 (54)	Leederville Oval (crowd: 9289)
Saturday, 30 June	Perth 12.9 (81)	def. by	South Fremantle 16.14 (110)	Lathlain Park (crowd: 7307)
Saturday, 30 June	Claremont 14.15 (99)	def. by	East Perth 15.10 (100)	Claremont Oval (crowd: 7356)
Saturday, 30 June	East Fremantle 7.16 (58)	def. by	Subiaco 16.13 (109)	East Fremantle Oval (crowd: 8309)
Three goals from the previously outplayed Archie Duda win East Perth a thriller against the tailender despite a 70-metre shot from Bruce Duperouzel on the siren (which was punched clear).

=== Round 14 ===
	Round 14
Saturday, 14 July	South Fremantle 6.10 (46)	def. by	West Perth 13.17 (95)	Fremantle Oval (crowd: 7402)
Saturday, 14 July	Swan Districts 3.12 (30)	def. by	Perth 5.11 (41)	Bassendean Oval (crowd: 5220)
Saturday, 14 July	Subiaco 12.19 (91)	def.	Claremont 10.8 (68)	Subiaco Oval (crowd: 5684)
Saturday, 14 July	East Perth 12.15 (87)	def.	East Fremantle 9.9 (63)	Perth Oval (crowd: 5358)
Perth were the first team goalless at half-time since East Fremantle kicked only 0.2 (2) in three quarters on the same weekend six years before. The Demons ultimately became the last team to win after being goalless at half-time until East Perth did so in 2002, and one of only four since 1921. (Note: The other two were by West Perth against Swan Districts in 1940 and the Cardinals against South Fremantle in 1966.); The aggregate score remains the lowest for Bassendean Oval and the second-lowest for any Swan Districts match. A lower aggregate score was not seen until Round 18, 1998.

=== Round 15 ===
	Round 15
Saturday, 21 July	Subiaco 14.9 (93)	def.	Swan Districts 12.7 (79)	Subiaco Oval (crowd: 6554)
Saturday, 21 July	East Perth 13.11 (89)	def.	West Perth 9.11 (65)	Perth Oval (crowd: 16659)
Saturday, 21 July	Claremont 13.14 (92)	def.	Perth 12.17 (89)	Claremont Oval (crowd: 5933)
Saturday, 21 July	East Fremantle 7.11 (53)	def. by	South Fremantle 17.9 (111)	East Fremantle Oval (crowd: 11960)

=== Round 16 ===
	Round 16
Saturday, 28 July	South Fremantle 18.9 (117)	def.	East Perth 12.16 (88)	Fremantle Oval (crowd: 10584)
Saturday, 28 July	Perth 6.15 (51)	def. by	Subiaco 8.9 (57)	Lathlain Park (crowd: 5868)
Saturday, 28 July	Swan Districts 10.11 (71)	def. by	Claremont 13.18 (96)	Bassendean Oval (crowd: 5000)
Saturday, 28 July	West Perth 21.12 (138)	def.	East Fremantle 11.18 (84)	Leederville Oval (crowd: 7534)
Perth were goalless at half-time for the second time in three weeks, the closest together successive occurrences by a team since Claremont in 1945 were goalless at half-time twice in consecutive matches against Perth and East Fremantle.; Two posters and the absence of forward mainstay Murray Couper allow Subiaco to hold on in the rain as Perth press hard at the close.

=== Round 17 ===
	Round 17
Saturday, 4 August	South Fremantle 8.13 (61)	def. by	Subiaco 15.8 (98)	Fremantle Oval (crowd: 12324)
Saturday, 4 August	East Perth 18.14 (122)	def.	Perth 10.14 (74)	Perth Oval (crowd: 7158)
Saturday, 4 August	Claremont 9.8 (62)	def. by	West Perth 9.13 (67)	Claremont Oval (crowd: not disclosed)
Saturday, 4 August	Swan Districts 14.13 (97)	def. by	East Fremantle 16.14 (110)	Bassendean Oval (crowd: not disclosed)
West Perth lose top spot despite winning a game where tailender Claremont wins three quarters, and their injuries rocket Subiaco to premiership favouritism for the first time at this stage since 1935.

=== Round 18 ===
	Round 18
Saturday, 11 August	Swan Districts 12.9 (81)	def.	South Fremantle 11.13 (79)	Bassendean Oval (crowd: 6002)
Saturday, 11 August	Perth 14.10 (94)	def.	West Perth 12.7 (79)	Lathlain Park (crowd: 6513)
Saturday, 11 August	Subiaco 10.12 (72)	def.	East Perth 8.15 (63)	Subiaco Oval (crowd: 12497)
Saturday, 11 August	East Fremantle 11.18 (84)	def.	Claremont 9.11 (65)	East Fremantle Oval (crowd: 6744)
Perth move from the bottom in a win that flatters the Cardinals - and this despite Cable suffering from asthma.; Swan Districts, despite scoring only 1.0 (6) to 6.4 (40) in the last quarter, end a run of nine defeats, with future Fitzroy forward star Bob Beecroft moved from the ruck for the first time to great effect despite kicking only three behinds.

=== Round 19 ===
	Round 19
Saturday, 18 August	West Perth 9.10 (64)	def.	Subiaco 9.8 (62)	Leederville Oval (crowd: 15262)
Saturday, 18 August	East Perth 13.13 (91)	def.	Swan Districts 7.10 (52)	Perth Oval (crowd: 8769)
Saturday, 18 August	Claremont 14.16 (100)	def. by	South Fremantle 16.13 (109)	Claremont Oval (crowd: 7570)
Saturday, 18 August	East Fremantle 20.16 (136)	def.	Perth 10.9 (69)	East Fremantle Oval (crowd: 7342)
Bill Dempsey and reluctant defender Keith Miller help the Cardinals rebound to a thrilling win in a battle of defences. Austin Robertson kicked four goals to finish the match with 1,201, two behind former Cardinal Tyson.

=== Round 20 ===
	Round 20
Saturday, 25 August	Swan Districts 13.17 (95)	def.	West Perth 10.16 (76)	Bassendean Oval (crowd: 7620)
Saturday, 25 August	South Fremantle 20.18 (138)	def.	Perth 10.16 (76)	Fremantle Oval (crowd: 8235)
Saturday, 25 August	East Perth 16.10 (106)	def.	Claremont 9.17 (71)	Perth Oval (crowd: 8334)
Saturday, 25 August	Subiaco 15.15 (105)	def.	East Fremantle 11.15 (81)	Subiaco Oval (crowd: 9899)
Austin Robertson was chaired from the ground after three goals took him to the WANFL record which he has held since.

=== Round 21 ===
	Round 21
Saturday, 1 September	West Perth 11.14 (80)	def.	South Fremantle 9.18 (72)	Leederville Oval (crowd: 12873)
Saturday, 1 September	Perth 14.16 (100)	def.	Swan Districts 13.14 (92)	Lathlain Park (crowd: 7362)
Saturday, 1 September	Claremont 14.10 (94)	def. by	Subiaco 17.18 (120)	Claremont Oval (crowd: 6608)
Saturday, 1 September	East Fremantle 17.19 (121)	def.	East Perth 9.12 (66)	East Fremantle Oval (crowd: 9936)
East Fremantle's desperation and determination gives them an unexpected finals place after rivals South lose.

== Ladder ==
1973 WANFL ladder
Pos	Team	Pld	W	L	D	PF	PA	PP	Pts
1	Subiaco (P)	21	16	5	0	1873	1514	123.7	64
2	West Perth	21	15	6	0	1749	1504	116.3	60
3	East Perth	21	14	7	0	2006	1768	113.5	56
4	East Fremantle	21	11	10	0	1834	2009	91.3	44
5	South Fremantle	21	10	11	0	2003	1915	104.6	40
6	Swan Districts	21	8	13	0	1735	1883	92.1	32
7	Perth	21	6	15	0	1635	2008	81.4	24
8	Claremont	21	4	17	0	1720	1954	88.0	16

Rules for classification: 1) points; 2) percentage; 3) number of points for.
(P) Premiers

== Finals ==
=== First semi-final ===
	First semi-final
Sunday, 9 September	East Perth 17.19 (121)	def.	East Fremantle 9.18 (72)	Subiaco Oval (crowd: 25,500)
East Perth reverse the last round result with a dramatic team reshuffle, as East Fremantle fail to use a strong wind in the first quarter.

=== Second semi-final ===
	Second semi-final
Saturday, 15 September	Subiaco 13.7 (85)	def. by	West Perth 15.13 (103)	Subiaco Oval (crowd: 31,320)
Mel Whinnen's dominance of Peter Featherby in the centre and strong roving by Bill Valli and Shane Sheridan put the Cardinals in the Grand Final more comfortably than the score suggested.

=== Preliminary final ===
	Preliminary final
Saturday, 22 September	Subiaco 18.13 (121)	def.	East Perth 17.9 (111)	Subiaco Oval (crowd: 31,050)
Subiaco win for the fourth time over the Royals in a match notable for a behind to East Perth being retracted after being placed on the scoreboard late in the second quarter (due to a Lion free kick).

=== Grand Final ===
1973 WANFL Grand Final
Saturday, 29 September	West Perth	def. by	Subiaco	Subiaco Oval (crowd: 46,885)
2.0 (12); 4.2 (26); 5.2 (32); 6.4 (40)	Q1; Q2; Q3; Final	3.4 (22); 3.7 (25); 7.10 (52); 10.12 (72)	Umpires: Ross Capes; Simpson Medal: Dennis Blair (Subiaco)
Geoff Taylor 2, Anderson, Logan, Watling, Sheridan	Goals	Watt 4, Malone 3, Robertson, Fitzpatrick, Davenport
Aitken, Steward, Whinnen, Walker, Prunster, Knell	Best	Ross Smith, Blair, Watt, Manning, Davenport, Fitzpatrick, Crouch, Malone
Subiaco's superb defence win their first flag since 1924 on a very windy and damp afternoon.
