= Shane Yarran =

Australian rules footballer

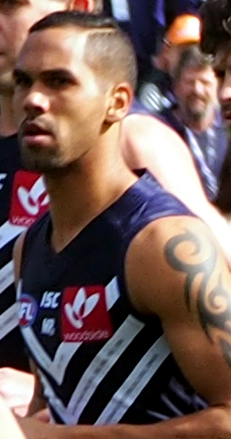
- Yarran at Domain Stadium in August 2016

Personal information
- Nickname: Yaz
- Born: 2 June 1989
- Died: 20 April 2018 (aged 28); Seville Grove, Western Australia
- Original team: Subiaco (WAFL)
- Draft: No. 61, 2015 national draft
- Debut: Round 18, 2016, Fremantle vs. Gold Coast, at Metricon Stadium
- Height: 186 cm (6 ft 1 in)
- Weight: 76 kg (168 lb)
- Position: Forward

Playing career^{1}
Years	Club	Games (Goals)
2014–2015	Subiaco (WAFL)	39 (93)
2016	Fremantle	6 (10)
	Peel Thunder (WAFL)	9 (17)
Total		54 (120)

Representative team honours^{2}
Years	Team	Games (Goals)
2015	Indigenous All-Stars	1 (1)
- ^{1} Playing statistics correct to the end of 2016.^{2} Representative statistics correct as of 2015.

Career highlights
- Bernie Naylor Medal (2015); 3× WAFL premiership player (2014, 2015, 2016)

Shane Yarran (2 June 1989 – 20 April 2018) was an Australian rules footballer. He played for the Fremantle Football Club in the Australian Football League (AFL) in the 2016 season. Yarran also played for Subiaco and Peel Thunder in the West Australian Football League (WAFL) and for Kelmscott and Gosnells in the Western Australian Amateur Football League (WAAFL).

Yarran's football career began in 2013 after he served a six-year prison sentence. After playing in the amateur and country leagues in 2013, he joined Subiaco in the WAFL in 2014 and helped the team win the premiership that year and the next. Yarran was awarded the Bernie Naylor Medal for kicking the most goals in the WAFL in 2015. He was picked up by the Fremantle Dockers in the 2015 AFL national draft and scored 10 goals for the team in the six games he played in the 2016 season.

He also played for Peel Thunder in the WAFL in 2016, helping the team win their first premiership. Yarran's football career was plagued by criminal and drug issues off the field. He retired from AFL at the end of 2016 due to his personal issues. He returned to the WAAFL, playing for Kelmscott in 2017. In May 2017, he spent time in jail again following a high-speed police pursuit. In 2018, he played for Gosnells in the WAAFL. Yarran died by suicide in April 2018.

== Early life and education ==
Yarran was born in 1989; his parents were Mick and Cheryl, and he had an older brother, Malcolm. He was a Noongar Aboriginal. Yarran grew up in Midvale, Western Australia, living in his grandparents' home on Bushby Street near Fremantle teammate Michael Walters, West Coast's Nic Naitanui and his cousin Chris Yarran. The four attended the same school and played football together in their childhood. Yarran participated in the Clontarf Foundation's program to improve the lives of young Indigenous men through football. In 2009, Yarran was sentenced to six years in prison for burglary.

== Career ==
After his release in 2013, Yarran began playing football in the Western Australian Amateur Football League (WAAFL) C1 grade for Gosnells and in the Peel Football League for South Mandurah. He made his debut for Subiaco in the West Australian Football League (WAFL) in 2014. He kicked 39 goals in his first season. In 2015, he kicked 54 goals to win the Bernie Naylor Medal as the leading goalkicker in the WAFL. Subiaco won the premiership in both seasons. Yarran also played for the Indigenous All-Stars in their exhibition match against the West Coast Eagles on 20 February 2015.

He was picked up by Fremantle with the 61st selection in the 2015 AFL national draft. He made his AFL debut playing against Gold Coast in round 18, 2016 at Metricon Stadium. A few weeks earlier he pleaded guilty to a charge of disorderly behaviour and was fined $800 after being arrested outside a Leederville nightclub in June 2016. The club also imposed sanctions on Yarran including undertaking an ongoing counselling program and a period of volunteer work with a community organisation. On 16 November 2016, Yarran was charged with aggravated assault following a family dispute. He pleaded not guilty in February 2017 and the charge was later dropped.

While still a listed Dockers player, Yarran played for Peel Thunder in the 2016 WAFL season. He kicked five goals in their grand final match against his old team Subiaco to help Peel win their first premiership. In December 2016, Yarran retired from AFL football. Fremantle CEO Steve Rosich said "[Yarran] and his management believe that focusing on his personal and off-field matters at this time needs to take priority over his football career." He played a total of six games for Fremantle, scoring 10 goals.

In 2017, Yarran returned to the WAAFL and played in the B grade for Kelmscott. In May 2017, Yarran was arrested after a high-speed police pursuit through Gosnells which ended with him jumping from a moving car. He pleaded guilty to charges in August and was sentenced to six months in prison which was backdated to include the three months he had been in custody since his arrest. Yarran was handed a concurrent three-month jail term for failing to stop and fined almost $5000 for several other charges, including driving without a licence, breaching bail and breaching a violence restraining order. Yarran had breached the restraining order when he approached his partner after taking methamphetamine and prescription drugs. He was taken to hospital after he acted erratically and abused police officers. His defence lawyer said Yarran fell into the wrong group of peers and started using drugs after earning more disposable income. Later in August, Yarran was acquitted of assaulting his partner after she failed to turn up to court to give evidence.

Next season, Yarran played for Gosnells in the WAAFL C1 grade. He had also been training with Subiaco since mid-December 2017 and working towards a return to the WAFL. In March 2018, Yarran was convicted (in his absence) of trespassing on two properties in December 2017. He was fined $600 and ordered to pay almost $200 in court costs. Later in March, Yarran was acquitted of an unlawful wounding charge after prosecutors said there was no reasonable prospect of him being convicted. He was alleged to have stabbed a man with a broken bottle during a brawl outside a tavern in Camillo in July 2015. His defence counsel said the charge had triggered Yarran's methamphetamine addiction but that the AFL Players Association was assisting with his rehabilitation. On 6 April 2018, Yarran appeared in court and pleaded not guilty to a charge of attempted aggravated home burglary with intent. He clashed with media outside the court and allegedly shoved a TV cameraman to the ground.

Days before his death, Yarran was subject to verbal abuse by players on the opposing team at his last football game. He was repeatedly called a "criminal", a "wife-basher" and a "gutless thug". Yarran told a confidant after the match that he was unsure if he would continue playing football, given the abuse he was likely to endure.

== Personal life and death ==
On 20 April 2018, Yarran was found dead in his Seville Grove home after he died by suicide. The Dockers wore black armbands in tribute to Yarran at their game against the Western Bulldogs the next day. He had a daughter.

== Statistics ==
Legend
G	Goals	K	Kicks	D	Disposals	T	Tackles
B	Behinds	H	Handballs	M	Marks

Season	Team	No.	Games	Totals							Averages (per game)						
Season	Team	No.	Games	G	B	K	H	D	M	T	G	B	K	H	D	M	T
2016	Fremantle	41	6	10	5	45	23	68	24	15	1.7	0.8	7.5	3.8	11.3	4.0	2.5
Career			6	10	5	45	23	68	24	15	1.7	0.8	7.5	3.8	11.3	4.0	2.5
