= 1968 WANFL season =

Australian rules football season

1968 WAFL season
- Teams: 8
- Premiers: Perth; 5th premiership
- Minor premiers: Perth; 4th minor premiership
- Sandover Medallist: Barry Cable (Perth)
- Bernie Naylor Medallist: Austin Robertson, Jr. (Subiaco)

Attendance
- Matches played: 88
- Total attendance: 879,612 (9,996 per match)

The 1968 WANFL season was the 84th season of senior football in Perth, Western Australia. It saw Perth, after having won only two premierships in its first sixty-six seasons, win its third consecutive flag under captain-coach Mal Atwell and champion rover Barry Cable – all three Grand Finals having been won against East Perth with Cable taking the Simpson Medal.

Among numerous highlights, champion Subiaco full-forward Austin "Ocker" Robertson broke by one goal the 1953 record of Bernie Naylor for the most goals in a WANFL home-and-away season, doing so with a whopping twenty-six scoring shots against East Fremantle in the final round. Perth achieved the best record for a full season since South Fremantle's champion 1953 team with only two losses – which Barry Cable missed due to a broken hand and then interstate duties – whilst West Perth, under former East Perth champion “Polly” Farmer as captain-coach lost only three home-and-away matches to equal the Cardinals' 1953 record. East Perth were to have a slow start and were in danger of missing the finals until July, but three last-kick wins – the last two after surrendering big leads – took the Royals to the Grand Final.

In contrast, Swan Districts – who had at the beginning of the decade risen from a long period as a chopping block to a hat-trick of premierships – fell to become the first WANFL team to win only one match in a season since they themselves did so in 1951, owing to extreme weakness in the ruck where expected top follower Dave Dalgarno moved to QAFL club Western Districts under an ANFC coaching scheme without playing a league match, major injuries to key players Ken Bagley, John Turnbull and Peter Manning, and the retirement of numerous key players of between 1961 and 1965. The Swans introduced an incentive scheme of paying players a $15 match fee for a win instead of the standard $5 after twelve rounds, but this had little effect. Their solitary win, by one point with a kick after the siren, made Swans the closest club to a winless season in open-age WA(N)FL competition between 1918 and 1998. East Fremantle, after falling to seventh in 1967, had their worst season since the club's first year in 1898, in the process setting a still-standing club record of thirteen consecutive defeats, whilst Subiaco, coached by Haydn Bunton Jr., rose from last to fourth aided by Robertson's prolific goalkicking. However, in the most uneven season in a major Australian Rules league, (Note: In terms of Noll-Scully index of competitive balance the 1968 WANFL season's figure of 2.5912 is the highest ever observed in any of the VFL/AFL, SANFL or WA(N)FL.) they won all 12 games against the four teams that missed the finals, but lost all 9 matches against the three Perth clubs that finished above them on the ladder. That pattern would continue into the finals, where they lost the first semi to East Perth.

== Home-and-away season ==
=== Round 1 ===
	Round 1
Saturday, 6 April	Subiaco 24.8 (152)	def.	Swan Districts 14.18 (102)	Subiaco Oval (crowd: 8017)
Saturday, 6 April	Perth 15.14 (104)	def.	East Perth 13.16 (94)	Lathlain Park (crowd: 15607)
Saturday, 6 April	South Fremantle 14.16 (100)	def. by	Claremont 16.12 (108)	Fremantle Oval (crowd: 10162)
Saturday, 6 April	West Perth 17.17 (119)	def.	East Fremantle 10.11 (71)	Leederville Oval (crowd: 11654)
Perth produce a wonderful last-quarter revival, scoring 7.5 (47) to 2.0 (12) to win the replay of the 1967 Grand Final. The Royals' preoccupation with Cable – which did reduce the champion's effectiveness – leaves them without rovers of their own to counter Perth's rucks.; In their first match under former Swans coach Bunton junior, Subiaco achieve the biggest win with equal scoring shots in WA(N)FL history as "Ocker" begins his record season-to-be with thirteen goals.

=== Round 2 ===
	Round 2
Saturday, 13 April	Swan Districts 5.12 (42)	def. by	South Fremantle 13.16 (94)	Bassendean Oval (crowd: 9377)
Saturday, 13 April	East Fremantle 4.11 (35)	def. by	Perth 6.12 (48)	East Fremantle Oval (crowd: 10627)
Monday, 15 April	East Perth 9.16 (70)	def. by	West Perth 14.11 (95)	Perth Oval (crowd: 17079)
Monday, 15 April	Claremont 11.8 (74)	def. by	Subiaco 18.16 (124)	Claremont Oval (crowd: 9742)
Perth's winning of the toss and gaining use of the wind with a dry ball wins the match, as a big rainstorm begins eight minutes into the second quarter and with a slippery ball no more goals are scored until the last quarter.

=== Round 3 ===
	Round 3
Saturday, 20 April	Perth 20.16 (136)	def.	Swan Districts 4.9 (33)	Lathlain Park (crowd: 8756)
Saturday, 20 April	East Perth 15.15 (105)	def.	Subiaco 8.14 (62)	Perth Oval (crowd: 13266)
Saturday, 20 April	West Perth 15.12 (102)	def.	Claremont 11.8 (74)	Leederville Oval (crowd: 11376)
Saturday, 20 April	South Fremantle 14.24 (108)	def.	East Fremantle 8.17 (65)	Fremantle Oval (crowd: 12212)

=== Round 4 ===
	Round 4
Saturday, 27 April	Subiaco 16.14 (110)	def.	South Fremantle 12.14 (86)	Subiaco Oval (crowd: 8525)
Saturday, 27 April	West Perth 9.15 (69)	def. by	Perth 11.11 (77)	Leederville Oval (crowd: 20729)
Saturday, 27 April	Swan Districts 12.8 (80)	def. by	East Perth 14.15 (99)	Bassendean Oval (crowd: 6531)
Saturday, 27 April	East Fremantle 13.15 (93)	def.	Claremont 9.11 (65)	East Fremantle Oval (crowd: 7068)
The Leederville Oval match, with both clubs undefeated, drew what remains Perth's biggest home-and-away attendance. The Demons' desire and toughness, along with West Perth's careless shooting and the use of Farmer in defence to compensate for the loss of Brian France, ensures the black and reds stay unbeaten.

=== Round 5 ===
	Round 5
Saturday, 4 May	South Fremantle 13.11 (89)	def. by	West Perth 13.21 (99)	Fremantle Oval (crowd: 12239)
Saturday, 4 May	Subiaco 13.10 (88)	def. by	Perth 12.21 (93)	Subiaco Oval (crowd: 13284)
Saturday, 4 May	Claremont 12.22 (94)	def.	Swan Districts 8.11 (59)	Claremont Oval (crowd: 6208)
Saturday, 4 May	East Perth 10.20 (80)	def. by	East Fremantle 15.10 (100)	Perth Oval (crowd: 10144)
In a magnificent match, Perth revealed its toughness by holding on in the last quarter when extremely tired.; The extreme inaccuracy of forwards Tierney and Haughan, plus East Fremantle's vastly superior disposal, gives the blue and whites a surprise win that makes the Royals appear doubtful finalists.

=== Round 6 ===
	Round 6
Saturday, 11 May	West Perth 23.21 (159)	def.	Subiaco 10.3 (63)	Leederville Oval (crowd: 17585)
Saturday, 11 May	Perth 14.21 (105)	def.	South Fremantle 13.11 (89)	Lathlain Park (crowd: 11614)
Saturday, 11 May	Claremont 11.12 (78)	def. by	East Perth 15.22 (112)	Claremont Oval (crowd: 8240)
Saturday, 11 May	East Fremantle 11.20 (86)	def.	Swan Districts 9.11 (65)	East Fremantle Oval (crowd: 5861)
With Farmer revealing that he has lost nothing of his brilliant playmaking skill with age, West Perth crush the Maroons to overtake Perth on percentage (though then a game behind) and stake genuine premiership claims.

=== Round 7 ===
	Round 7
Saturday, 18 May	Swan Districts 8.8 (56)	def. by	West Perth 13.21 (99)	Bassendean Oval (crowd: 7258)
Saturday, 18 May	South Fremantle 15.22 (112)	def.	East Perth 11.15 (81)	Fremantle Oval (crowd: 12225)
Saturday, 18 May	Perth 13.11 (89)	def.	Claremont 10.13 (73)	Lathlain Park (crowd: 8245)
Saturday, 18 May	Subiaco 15.11 (101)	def.	East Fremantle 5.12 (42)	Subiaco Oval (crowd: 9472)
With their win – achieved without Barry Cable who broke his hand – Perth surpass their 1907 and 1966 record of eleven consecutive victories. The Demons were to surpass this record in less than a season.; After a tense opening, Subiaco's ruck dominance ensures the Maroons run right away from East Fremantle in a match marred by excessive ineffective handballing. John Sarre and Peter Burton are dominant for the Maroons whilst "Ocker" reaches his fifty goals.

=== Round 8 ===
	Round 8
Saturday, 25 May	Swan Districts 16.13 (109)	def. by	Subiaco 20.11 (131)	Bassendean Oval (crowd: 6865)
Saturday, 25 May	East Perth 19.12 (126)	def.	Perth 9.7 (61)	Perth Oval (crowd: 15612)
Saturday, 25 May	Claremont 14.13 (97)	def. by	South Fremantle 18.17 (125)	Claremont Oval (crowd: 9354)
Saturday, 25 May	East Fremantle 8.12 (60)	def. by	West Perth 11.12 (78)	East Fremantle Oval (crowd: 9471)
East Perth run away from the two-time premiers after a close first half, as the absence of Cable and Greg Brehaut and a demolition job on Pat Dalton by Ken McAullay – along with an excellent effort by the Royal backline – keeps Perth to 3.3 (21) against 11.5 (71) after the long interval.; With Bill Walker magnificent in his 150th match for the club, Swan Districts produce their best half of football during 1968 before a fade-out and the loss of fullback Downey allows Subiaco to win well after having been 27 points behind at the long interval.

=== Round 9 ===
	Round 9
Saturday, 1 June	West Perth 12.11 (83)	def.	East Perth 12.9 (81)	Leederville Oval (crowd: 19215)
Saturday, 1 June	Subiaco 16.11 (107)	def.	Claremont 11.15 (81)	Subiaco Oval (crowd: 8700)
Monday, 3 June	South Fremantle 17.18 (120)	def.	Swan Districts 14.9 (93)	Fremantle Oval (crowd: 6794)
Monday, 3 June	Perth 18.12 (120)	def.	East Fremantle 8.11 (59)	Lathlain Park (crowd: 6320)
In a "fantastic" match, East Perth just fail to snatch a victory over the leaders despite a poor opening half – the Royals took the lead late in the last quarter before a fine goal from Smeath won the game.; Barry Cable, despite having his left hand in plaster, has six kicks in as many minutes at the start and handles the ball superbly in the rain, so that Perth keep complete control apart from a three-goal Old East burst at the end of the opening quarter.

=== Round 10 ===
	Round 10
Saturday, 8 June	Swan Districts 12.8 (80)	def. by	Perth 28.22 (190)	Bassendean Oval (crowd: 4713)
Saturday, 8 June	Subiaco 15.10 (100)	def. by	East Perth 17.13 (115)	Subiaco Oval (crowd: 9165)
Saturday, 8 June	Claremont 9.8 (62)	def. by	West Perth 17.12 (114)	Claremont Oval (crowd: 5898)
Saturday, 8 June	East Fremantle 11.16 (82)	def. by	South Fremantle 13.14 (92)	East Fremantle Oval (crowd: 8366)
A brilliant third quarter by East Perth led by devastating pace from winger Chadwick, gives the Royals a vital victory to stay within a game of fourth position.; Perth kick their highest score to that point in the WANFL, and still their third-highest on record, beating 27.25 (187) from the opening round of 1966. Gerry Iseger kicks 8.4 (52) from eighteen kicks and Greg Bennett the same score from 31 kicks.

=== Round 11 ===
	Round 11
Saturday, 15 June	South Fremantle 12.12 (84)	def. by	Subiaco 17.12 (114)	Fremantle Oval (crowd: 8666)
Saturday, 15 June	Perth 11.10 (76)	def. by	West Perth 19.14 (128)	Lathlain Park (crowd: 11557)
Saturday, 15 June	East Perth 18.19 (127)	def.	Swan Districts 9.12 (66)	Perth Oval (crowd: 7555)
Saturday, 15 June	Claremont 13.14 (92)	def.	East Fremantle 8.9 (57)	Claremont Oval (crowd: 4882)
Replacement defender Greg Astbury gives a stunning display at centre half-back in a battle between the two top teams – both depleted by interstate calls – as he systematically defeats the Demon attack.; In a very poor match, South Fremantle lose their place in the four, as its forward line consistently lets itself down whilst Paul Heavey kicks five as a replacement for the irrepressible "Ocker".

=== Round 12 ===
	Round 12
Saturday, 22 June	West Perth 21.13 (139)	def.	South Fremantle 14.12 (96)	Leederville Oval (crowd: 13010)
Saturday, 22 June	Perth 13.28 (106)	def.	Subiaco 10.14 (74)	Lathlain Park (crowd: 11814)
Saturday, 22 June	Claremont 12.22 (94)	def.	Swan Districts 10.12 (72)	Claremont Oval (crowd: 5397)
Saturday, 22 June	East Fremantle 14.11 (95)	def. by	East Perth 17.10 (112)	East Fremantle Oval (crowd: 7129)
West Perth push South Fremantle to a game out of the four as John Wynne plays impressively in his new role at centre half-forward due to Astbury's superb in his former position work the previous week, in the process adding to the already-efficient Cardinal play.; Despite failing to break their winless season, Swan Districts officials are impressed by the players' determination in a high-standard game.

=== Round 13 ===
	Round 13
Saturday, 29 June	Subiaco 15.8 (98)	def. by	West Perth 16.12 (108)	Subiaco Oval (crowd: 7471)
Saturday, 29 June	South Fremantle 11.13 (79)	def. by	Perth 12.18 (90)	Fremantle Oval (crowd: 6742)
Saturday, 29 June	East Perth 8.17 (65)	def. by	Claremont 11.9 (75)	Perth Oval (crowd: 6750)
Saturday, 29 June	Swan Districts 14.18 (102)	def.	East Fremantle 15.11 (101)	Bassendean Oval (crowd: 2963)
In heavy conditions after torrential late-morning rain, Claremont surprise East Perth thanks to Lorne Cook's solidity at centre half-back, leaving the Tigers two wins from fourth position after three wins in succession.; A display of sheer determination against a strengthening wind in the final quarter allows Swan Districts to record their solitary win for the season when Bill Holmes goals after the siren.

=== Interstate match ===
Interstate match
Saturday, 6 July	Western Australia	def. by	Victoria	Subiaco Oval (crowd: 42,350)
1.3 (9); 3.6 (24); 9.8 (62); 13.12 (90)	Q1; Q2; Q3; Final	3.2 (20); 9.9 (63); 11.15 (81); 13.21 (99)	Umpires: Ray Scott; Simpson Medal: Hassa Mann (Victoria)
Robertson 6.2; Smeath 2.2; Grljusich 2.1; Farmer, Walker 1.2; Cable 1.0; Boyanich, Chadwick, Millson 0.1	Goals	5.8 Hudson; 2.2 Hart; 2.1 Jesaulenko; 1.4 Nicholls; 1.2 Goggin; 1.1 Skilton; 1.0 Noonan; 0.1 Watt, Thompson
Grljusich, Millson, Cable, Chadwick, Graham, Turnbull, Farmer	Best	Mann, Hart, Nicholls, Watt, Marshall, Jesaulenko, Davis, Skilton
Manning (concussion); Sampson (exhaustion)	Injuries	Noonan (leg); Ditterich (cramp)
A major lapse between late in the first quarter and half-time denies Western Australia a victory that their play in the second half – when they scored ten goals to four – almost warranted.

=== Round 14 ===
	Round 14
Saturday, 13 July	West Perth 13.17 (95)	def.	Swan Districts 10.15 (75)	Leederville Oval (crowd: 8131)
Saturday, 13 July	East Perth 21.22 (148)	def.	South Fremantle 10.15 (75)	Perth Oval (crowd: 13510)
Saturday, 13 July	Perth 20.21 (141)	def.	Claremont 11.14 (80)	Lathlain Park (crowd: 9002)
Saturday, 13 July	East Fremantle 11.12 (78)	def. by	Subiaco 21.8 (134)	East Fremantle Oval (crowd: 6453)
Perth return to their brilliant best to score 13.12 (90) to 3.4 (22) in the second half and end Claremont's faint finals hopes, as Pat Dalton dominates the centre with thirty kicks and Gerry Iseger scores 8.3.; Acting Maroon skipper Robertson kicks 13.2 (80) to reach 101 goals in just thirteen matches, as East Fremantle's short-kicking play fails to counter the Maroons' more direct approach.; East Perth deal a crushing blow to South Fremantle's finals hopes by kicking 19.17 (131) to 4.6 (30) in the final three quarters, as the gamble of playing the veteran Gerovich fails and the Royal rovers run riot.

=== Round 15 ===
	Round 15
Saturday, 20 July	Swan Districts 14.14 (98)	def. by	Subiaco 14.17 (101)	Bassendean Oval (crowd: 6276)
Saturday, 20 July	Perth 17.13 (115)	def.	East Perth 12.20 (92)	Lathlain Park (crowd: 16657)
Saturday, 20 July	South Fremantle 16.20 (116)	def.	Claremont 10.16 (76)	Fremantle Oval (crowd: 7422)
Saturday, 20 July	West Perth 18.13 (121)	def.	East Fremantle 10.17 (77)	Leederville Oval (crowd: 7653)
A dazzling final quarter into the breeze allows Perth to stay within a game of West Perth at the top – with Cable consistently linking runners the Demons' teamwork is what tells.; West Perth win their eleventh consecutive game, breaking their ten-game streak from 1948 and still their longest winning streak on record.; With the brilliant Walker kicking five goals and Peter Downey keeping Robertson to only 3.2 (20) on a fine day, Swans only just fail to cause a huge upset after giving Subiaco a six-goal start.

=== Round 16 ===
	Round 16
Saturday, 27 July	Swan Districts 17.15 (117)	def. by	South Fremantle 20.20 (140)	Bassendean Oval (crowd: 5592)
Saturday, 27 July	East Perth 17.7 (109)	def.	West Perth 11.15 (81)	Perth Oval (crowd: 14983)
Saturday, 27 July	Claremont 11.14 (80)	def. by	Subiaco 18.17 (125)	Claremont Oval (crowd: 5646)
Saturday, 27 July	East Fremantle 13.10 (88)	def. by	Perth 18.19 (127)	East Fremantle Oval (crowd: 4619)
East Perth's greater accuracy – with two brilliant goals from Bandy and Bygraves – ends West Perth's eleven-match winning streak and leaves South looking to displace Subiaco rather than the Royals to enter the four.

=== Round 17 ===
	Round 17
Saturday, 3 August	Swan Districts 13.8 (86)	def. by	Perth 17.24 (126)	Bassendean Oval (crowd: 6206)
Saturday, 3 August	Subiaco 15.6 (96)	def. by	East Perth 25.9 (159)	Subiaco Oval (crowd: 14656)
Saturday, 3 August	West Perth 20.11 (131)	def.	Claremont 11.11 (77)	Leederville Oval (crowd: 7291)
Saturday, 3 August	South Fremantle 20.14 (134)	def.	East Fremantle 14.12 (96)	Fremantle Oval (crowd: 8720)
In an exciting game that determined who would secure their finals berth, East Perth are behind most of the afternoon, but stay in touch before Gary Bygraves kicks the first of three on-the-siren wins.; With a high-speed hard-tackling game that jolts Perth off-balance to the extent their attack kicks fifteen behinds from nineteen shots in the first half, Swan Districts look like a massive upset before the return of Dalton to the centre takes control back and Perth score 13.9 (87) to 3.5 (23) in the second half.

=== Round 18 ===
	Round 18
Saturday, 10 August	Subiaco 19.8 (122)	def.	South Fremantle 11.10 (76)	Subiaco Oval (crowd: 6714)
Saturday, 10 August	Perth 5.10 (40)	def.	West Perth 5.7 (37)	Lathlain Park (crowd: 9836)
Saturday, 10 August	East Perth 15.22 (112)	def.	Swan Districts 2.8 (20)	Perth Oval (crowd: 4820)
Saturday, 10 August	East Fremantle 9.13 (67)	def. by	Claremont 13.16 (94)	East Fremantle Oval (crowd: 2601)
On a wet day, Swan Districts kick their lowest score until 2016, beating 3.3 (21) against Claremont four years before. It was to be the last score of fewer than three goals in the WA(N)FL until 1995.; Perth overhaul West Perth in a dour second semi-final preview. No WA(N)FL/Westar Rules team was to kick so low a winning score again until 2000. An elementary defensive error from the experienced Dempsey gives Perth the only goal of the final quarter to win.; Ten goals in the wet from Austin Robertson seals the four as South Fremantle score only four behinds with the wind during the second quarter, whilst Subiaco's skill in keeping the ball low into the wind brings excellent rewards.

=== Round 19 ===
	Round 19
Saturday, 17 August	South Fremantle 12.10 (82)	def. by	West Perth 16.12 (108)	Fremantle Oval (crowd: 6488)
Saturday, 17 August	Subiaco 6.8 (44)	def. by	Perth 12.11 (83)	Subiaco Oval (crowd: 10911)
Saturday, 17 August	Swan Districts 6.10 (46)	def. by	Claremont 14.9 (93)	Bassendean Oval (crowd: 2558)
Saturday, 17 August	East Perth 9.21 (75)	def.	East Fremantle 5.8 (38)	Perth Oval (crowd: 5083)
Subiaco's excessive use of handball in the wet conditions, and Graham Ramshaw's superb effort keeping Robertson to two goals, ensures Perth give a fine demonstration of wet-weather football and become firm premiership favourites.; Despite East Perth kicking 1.18 (24) after quarter-time with acting captain Phil Tierney kicking nine straight behinds, East Fremantle lose their thirteenth consecutive match, breaking their twelve-game sequence from 1898, as the Royals' four goals during the opening nine minutes are never made up.

=== Round 20 ===
	Round 20
Saturday, 24 August	West Perth 21.18 (144)	def.	Subiaco 12.10 (82)	Leederville Oval (crowd: 11147)
Saturday, 24 August	Perth 25.19 (169)	def.	South Fremantle 7.17 (59)	Lathlain Park (crowd: 6079)
Saturday, 24 August	Claremont 13.10 (88)	def. by	East Perth 17.18 (120)	Claremont Oval (crowd: 5185)
Saturday, 24 August	East Fremantle 15.16 (106)	def.	Swan Districts 13.9 (87)	East Fremantle Oval (crowd: 2985)
Farmer's brilliant ball skills and Subiaco's lack of pace ensure the Cardinals jump the Maroons and maintain that club's record of not having defeated another finalist.; Perth become the first WANFL team for seven seasons to win eighteen home-and-away matches, crushing South Fremantle with an eighteen-goal second half. Cable was back to his best with 5.2 (32) and Iseger takes seventeen marks at full-forward for seven goals four behinds.

=== Round 21 ===
	Round 21
Saturday, 31 August	West Perth 22.28 (160)	def.	Swan Districts 13.8 (86)	Leederville Oval (crowd: 7174)
Saturday, 31 August	South Fremantle 19.22 (136)	def.	East Perth 16.9 (105)	Fremantle Oval (crowd: 7357)
Saturday, 31 August	Claremont 6.13 (49)	def. by	Perth 19.17 (131)	Claremont Oval (crowd: 6003)
Saturday, 31 August	Subiaco 19.14 (128)	def.	East Fremantle 7.12 (54)	Subiaco Oval (crowd: 6909)
Austin Robertson, kicking 15.11 (101), overhauls Bernie Naylor's 156 goals from the 1953 season – it being said that the Subiaco players, assured of victory, would "kick it backwards" to him. He kicked 8.9 (57) in the first half as many Maroon players in better goal-scoring positions looked for him, and had fifteen of Subiaco's first seventeen goals. (Note: The only greater monopolisation of a team's goals for a team score with fifteen or more goals in a major Australian Rules league is by Ted Tyson for West Perth against Swan Districts in the final round of 1938, when he kicked 17.5 (107) out of the Cardinals' 18.7 (115).); Despite ten goals six behinds from Phil Tierney after he was cleared of charges from the previous match, East Perth are run off their legs by South Fremantle's pace, along with much wayward Royal kicking across the face of the goals.

== Ladder ==
1968 WANFL ladder
Pos	Team	Pld	W	L	D	PF	PA	PP	Pts
1	Perth (P)	21	19	2	0	2227	1562	142.6	76
2	West Perth	21	18	3	0	2269	1601	141.7	72
3	East Perth	21	13	8	0	2187	1760	124.3	52
4	Subiaco	21	12	9	0	2156	2036	105.9	48
5	South Fremantle	21	10	11	0	2092	2166	96.6	40
6	Claremont	21	7	14	0	1704	2096	81.3	28
7	East Fremantle	21	4	17	0	1550	2082	74.4	16
8	Swan Districts	21	1	20	0	1574	2456	64.1	4

Rules for classification: 1) points; 2) percentage; 3) number of points for.
(P) Premiers

== Finals ==
=== First semi-final ===
	First semi-final
Saturday, 7 September	East Perth 15.16 (106)	def.	Subiaco 15.13 (103)	Subiaco Oval (crowd: 30,735)
East Perth record a second on-the-siren victory over Subiaco, this time after the Maroons took the lead after having been forty-five points behind early in the final quarter, only to see Vic Evans produce a fine snap out of a pack.

=== Second semi-final ===
	Second semi-final
Saturday, 14 September	Perth 15.12 (102)	def.	West Perth 10.15 (75)	Subiaco Oval (crowd: 31,177)
By putting himself on the ball with Cable and Jenzen, Perth captain-coach Mal Atwell leads a superb comeback as the Demons score the final eight goals for a convincing victory in a physically tough match.

=== Preliminary final ===
	Preliminary final
Saturday, 21 September	West Perth 9.8 (62)	def. by	East Perth 9.11 (65)	Subiaco Oval (crowd: 25,206)
East Perth win another thriller via a late goal following an opposition comeback as West Perth kick six goals in seventeen minutes after being thirty-four points behind with only three goals on the scoreboard early in the last quarter – with the late withdrawal of regular full-forward Dennis Cometti a sore blow.

=== Grand Final ===
1968 WANFL Grand Final
Saturday, 28 September	Perth	def.	East Perth	Subiaco Oval (crowd: 40,315)
1.2 (8); 9.8 (62); 11.11 (77); 16.14 (110)	Q1; Q2; Q3; Final	2.3 (15); 4.4 (28); 10.6 (66); 13.8 (86)	Umpires: Ray Scott; Simpson Medal: Barry Cable (Perth)
Iseger 3, Bennett 3, Astone 3, Miller 3, Jenzen, Cable, Dalton, King	Goals	Tierney 4, Bygraves 3, McCarthy 2, Haughan 2, Pitter, Gillespie
Cable, Astone, Dalton, Bennett, Milson, Rothnie	Best	Brown, McAullay, O‘Donoghue, Haines, Smith, Graham
Injuries	Armanasco (leg); McAullay (shoulder)
Perth, and Cable, achieve a hat-trick of wins in a solid display on a typically windy day, as the Royals suffer their fifth straight loss in Grand Finals. East Perth got within a goal midway through the final quarter before Perth's experience told and the Demons kicked away for a comfortable if not easy win.
