= Don Dixon (footballer) =

Australian rules footballer

Personal information
- Full name: Don Dixon
- Born: 18 November 1937 (age 88)
- Original team: Edenhope
- Height: 183 cm (6 ft 0 in)
- Weight: 81 kg (179 lb)

Playing career^{1}
Years	Club	Games (Goals)
1958–60	Collingwood	19 (4)
- ^{1} Playing statistics correct to the end of 1960.

Don Dixon is a former Australian rules footballer who played with Collingwood in the Victorian Football League (VFL).
