= David Rankin (footballer) =

Australian rules footballer

Personal information
- Full name: David James Rankin
- Born: 12 July 1960 (age 66)
- Original team: Colac
- Height: 173 cm (5 ft 8 in)
- Weight: 74 kg (163 lb)

Playing career^{1}
Years	Club	Games (Goals)
1980–1981	Fitzroy	9 (2)
1982–1990	East Fremantle	152 (67)
- ^{1} Playing statistics correct to the end of 1990.

David James Rankin (born 12 July 1960) is a former Australian rules footballer who played with Fitzroy in the Victorian Football League (VFL) and East Fremantle in the West Australian Football League (WAFL).

Rankin came to Fitzroy from Colac and made six appearances for Fitzroy in the 1980 VFL season. One of his most productive games came against South Melbourne when he had 20 disposals and kicked a goal. He did not participate in a single win that year but Fitzroy won all three games that he played in 1981, his final season.

For the rest of the 1980s, Rankin played at East Fremantle, mostly in defence or on the wing. He was a member of East Fremantle's 1985 premiership team, playing as a wingman in their five-point grand final win over Subiaco.
