= Dave Browning (Australian footballer) =

Australian rules footballer (1932–2023)

Personal information
- Full name: David Reginald Browning
- Born: 26 May 1932
- Died: 8 September 2023 (aged 91)
- Original team: Perth
- Height: 173 cm (5 ft 8 in)
- Weight: 76 kg (168 lb)

Playing career^{1}
Years	Club	Games (Goals)
1953-54	Perth	35 (56)
1955	Carlton	4 (1)
1956-60	Brighton (VFA)	55 (59)
- ^{1} Playing statistics correct to the end of 1960.

David Reginald Browning (26 May 1932 – 8 September 2023) was an Australian rules footballer who played with Perth in the West Australian Football League (WAFL), Carlton in the Victorian Football League (VFL) and Brighton Football Club in the Victorian Football Association (VFA).

Browning died on 8 September 2023, at the age of 91.
