= Ray Scott (Australian rules football) =

Australian rules footballer and umpire

Personal information
- Full name: Raymond Cyril Scott
- Born: 17 April 1927
- Died: 5 January 2003 (aged 75)
- Position: Full forward

Playing career^{1}
Years	Club	Games (Goals)	
1947–1955, 1959 (Note: The WANFL was an under-19s competition in 1944 due to the loss of players to serve in WWII.)	West Perth	189 (906) (Note: These tallies exclude one game and four goals in the 1944 under-19s competition.)	

Representative team honours^{2}
Years	Team	Games (Goals)	
1949–1951	Western Australia	5 (4)	

Umpiring career
Years	League	Role	Games
1961–1970	WANFL	Field umpire	141
- ^{1} Playing statistics correct to the end of 1959.^{2} Representative statistics correct as of 1951.

Career highlights
- West Perth premiership player – 1949, 1951; WANFL Grand Final umpire – 1963, 1968, 1969

Raymond Cyril Scott (17 April 1927 – 5 January 2003) was a leading Australian rules football player and field umpire in the West Australian National Football League (WANFL).

== WANFL playing career ==
Ray Scott began playing with the West Perth Football Club (the "Cardinals") in 1944 during the WANFL's under-age competition, where he played as a ruckman or centre half-back but was nonetheless viewed as extremely promising. Scott then spent two years in the Royal Australian Navy and rejoined the club for the 1947 season, during which he was shifted to full-forward in place of future champion defender Ray Schofield. He played 190 games between 1944 and 1959.

Scott was a highly successful forward, kicking 910 goals during his WANFL career. In 1953 he kicked 143 goals (including a career high of 15 in one game), but finished second in the League's goalkicking award to South Fremantle goalkicking legend Bernie Naylor, who posted a record 167 total goals, including 23 in one game.

Scott was the WANFL leading goal kicker in 1951 and 1955, and he topped West Perth's goal kicking from 1948 to 1955. He kicked one hundred goals or more in a season four times.

Scott represented Western Australia in 1948, 1949, and 1951 in matches against other States. He also played in West Perth premiership sides in 1949 and 1951. On 27 September 1954, Scott nearly lost his life when he fell from the ninth floor of the Royal Perth Hospital, being saved only by falling onto a construction lift.

Retiring from West Perth after the 1955 season, Scott played and coached in the Riverina Football League for three years, and after returning to Western Australia to play two more games with the Cardinals, took up umpiring.

== Umpiring career ==
Scott made a rapid (by the standards then applying) rise through the ranks of umpiring. He umpired his first League game in 1961 and his first Grand Final in 1963. His first interstate match was the 1964 South Australia versus Victoria game in Adelaide.

His status as a leading umpire was reinforced with WANFL Grand Final appointments in 1967 and 1968.

In June 1968, Scott umpired the Victoria versus South Australia clash at the Melbourne Cricket Ground. His performance impressed the Victorian officials as they made a special request of the Australian National Football Council for Scott to control the Western Australia versus Victoria match that was played in Subiaco in July. This was indeed remarkable as interstate matches were in those days always controlled by an umpire from a "neutral" State.

Scott retired from on-field umpiring at the end of the 1970 season after 141 matches and three Grand Finals.

In 1972, Scott became an umpires' coach and assistant to the WANFL Umpires Advisor. In 1977 he took on the role of WANFL Umpires Advisor. He remained as coach until 1979, and thereafter he continued with membership of the Umpires Appointment Board, chairing the board in 1981 and 1982.

== Awards ==
Scott's contributions to the WANFL totalled an impressive 38 years of service as an umpire, player and administrator. As a player and umpire, he participated in 330 WANFL matches, including six Grand Finals.

This outstanding contribution to the WANFL, and the sport in general, was recognised in 1975 with the National Football League Award of Merit. The then national body gave only one award per year, and the award was given for 'outstanding service to the game'.

In 1995, Scott was awarded Life Membership of the West Australian Football League.

He was inducted in the Australian Football Hall of Fame in 1996 in recognition of his services to umpiring.

In 2000 he was included in West Perth's Team of the Century.

== See also ==
- Ross, John (1999). The Australian Football Hall of Fame. Australia: HarperCollinsPublishers. p. 140. ISBN 0-7322-6426-X.
