= Mick Rea =

Australian rules footballer

Personal information
- Full name: Michael Desmond Rea
- Born: 10 December 1956 (age 69)
- Original team: Edithvale-Aspendale
- Height: 196 cm (6 ft 5 in)
- Weight: 105 kg (231 lb)
- Position: Full-forward

Playing career^{1}
Years	Club	Games (Goals)
1978	Melbourne	3 (1)
1981–1988	Perth	121 (468)
- ^{1} Playing statistics correct to the end of 1988.

Michael Desmond Rea (born 10 December 1956) is a former Australian rules footballer who played for Melbourne in the Victorian Football League (VFL) and Perth in the West Australian Football League (WAFL).

Recruited from Edithvale-Aspendale, Rea made three appearances with Melbourne late in the 1978 VFL season, all of which they lost. He wasn't kept on Melbourne's list the following year and joined Perth, with whom he would be a prolific forward until 1988, except for a brief stint with Mines Rovers in Collie during the 1984 season.

Rea topped the goal-kicking at Perth every season between 1982 and 1988 and he won two Bernie Naylor Medals as the WAFL's leading goal-kicker. He won the first in 1985 when he kicked exactly 100 goals and he backed it up in 1986 with 90 goals as Perth played senior finals for the first time since 1978 and the third-last occasion as of 2014. Although Rea never reached double figures for Perth's senior team despite averaging 3.87 goals per match, in his last appearance when relegated after indifferent form to reserve grade he kicked fourteen goals.
