= Leederville Oval =

Football stadium in Perth, Western Australia

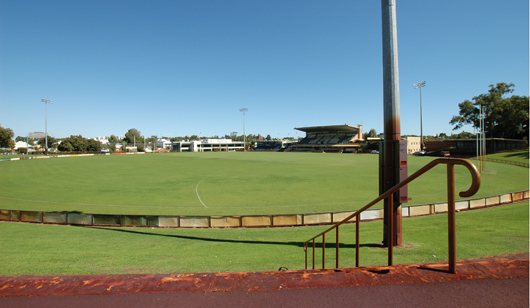
- Interactive map of Leederville Oval
- Full name: Leederville Oval
- Former names: Medibank Stadium
- Location: 246 Vincent Street, Leederville, Western Australia
- Coordinates: 31°56′7″S 115°50′38″E
- Owner: City of Vincent
- Capacity: 15,000
- Surface: Grass
- Scoreboard: Digital
- Record attendance: 24,567 (1978)

Construction
- Built: 1915
- Expanded: 1958, 2003

Tenants
- West Perth Football Club (1915–1993); Western Australian Amateur Athletic Association (1930s–1950s); East Perth Football Club (2003–); Subiaco Football Club (2004–)

Leederville Oval (known as Sullivan Logistics Stadium under a naming rights agreement) is an Australian rules football ground located in Leederville, a suburb of Perth, Western Australia. The ground is used as a home ground by two clubs: the East Perth Football Club and the Subiaco Football Club, both competing in the West Australian Football League (WAFL). The ground was previously home to the West Perth Football Club from 1915 to 1993, before the club moved to Arena Joondalup, its current home ground. The ground is serviced by the Yanchep line, with the nearest stop being Leederville station.

== History ==
Originally part of a series of interconnected wetlands north of the Perth central business district, the land now part of the ground was first established as a recreation reserve by the Municipality of Leederville in 1900. The ground was opened in July 1915 with a timber and brick grandstand as a purpose-built venue for the West Perth Football Club, who had previously shared the WACA Ground with the Perth Football Club. The first match was played on 24 July 1915, with Subiaco defeating West Perth by fifteen points, 10.9 (69) to 6.18 (54).

A number of other sports were played at Leederville Oval from the early 1920s to the early 1970s. The Western Australian Amateur Athletic Association leased the ground for a number of years, and the Australian Open Track and Field Championships were held there in 1940 (men's), 1947 (women's), 1953 (men's), 1954 (women's) and 1960 (men's). A picture theatre operated at the ground in 1924. Due to a dispute between the Perth City Council and the WANFL regarding the rental agreement, neither Leederville Oval nor Perth Oval were used during the 1940 WANFL season. West Perth were forced to use Subiaco Oval and East Perth the WACA Ground for the duration of the season.

The ground underwent extensive redevelopments beginning in 1958 to allow it to be used as a venue for the 1962 British Empire and Commonwealth Games in Perth. This involved "shrouding" the timber base of the old grandstand with concrete. The new construction was named the RP Fletcher Stand after the president of the West Perth Football Club from 1946 to 1962. A match between West Perth and East Perth in round 21 of the 1978 season saw 24,567 attend, a ground record.

West Perth vacated the ground in 1993, moving to Arena Joondalup for the 1994 season. At the last West Perth home game held at the ground, in August 1993 against Subiaco, a crowd of 20,112 people attended. A small number of East Perth and Subiaco home matches were played at the ground after 1994; however, these were not well-attended. With the restructure of the City of Perth in 1994, responsibility for the ground was transferred to the newly formed Town of Vincent. The council's headquarters were located in the Leederville Oval grandstand until its new administrative centre was constructed. The ground hosted two Australian Football League pre-season matches in February 1995: one between a West Coast under-23 and a Brisbane Lions under-23 side, and one between West Coast and Sydney.

After the East Perth and Subiaco Football Clubs agreed to move into the ground, in 2003 and 2004 respectively, a A$4 million redevelopment was announced, funded by the State Government and the Town of Vincent. It was also proposed by the Department of Sport and Recreation to move some interstate cricket matches to Leederville Oval from the WACA Ground; however this did not eventuate. In 2006, the Town of Vincent signed a A$250,000 naming rights deal with Medibank Private to rename the ground "Medibank Stadium" for three years. This was renewed in 2009. Leederville Oval hosted Australian Football League pre-season matches in 2006 and 2010, featuring West Coast and Hawthorn and West Coast and Carlton respectively, as well as WAFL inter-league matches in 2004, 2009 and 2010, and the WAFL Grand Final in 2022

Broadcast standard light towers were built at the ground in 2025 together with upgrades to the playing surface, players and spectator facilities.
