= West Australian Football League =

Australian football league

- Current season, competition or edition: 2026 WAFL season
- Formerly: 1885–1907: West Australian Football Association; 1931–1979: Western Australian National Football League; 1990: Western Australia State Football League; 1997–2000: Westar Rules
- Sport: Australian rules football
- Founded: 1885; 141 years ago
- First season: 1885; 141 years ago
- Owner: WA Football
- No. of teams: 10
- Region: Western Australia
- Most recent champion: Peel Thunder (4th premiership)
- Most titles: East Fremantle (30)
- Broadcasters: Seven Network; AFL Media
- Sponsor: Sullivan Logistics
- Website: www.wafl.com.au

The West Australian Football League (WAFL /ˈwɒfəl/ "waffle" or "W-A-F-L") is an Australian rules football league based in Perth, Western Australia. The league consists of ten teams which play a 20-round season from April to September. The top five teams then play a finals series, culminating in a Grand Final. The league also runs reserve, colts (under 19) and women's competitions.

The WAFL was founded in 1885 as the West Australian Football Association (WAFA) and, after several name changes, adopted its current name in 2001. For most of its existence, the league was considered one of the "big three" Australian rules football leagues with the Victorian Football League and South Australian National Football League. Since the introduction of two Western Australia-based clubs into the Victorian Football League (later renamed the Australian Football League)—the West Coast Eagles in 1987 and the Fremantle Dockers in 1995—the league's popularity and quality have decreased to the point where it is considered a feeder competition of the Australian Football League.

Although players are paid, the WAFL is generally considered a semi-professional league with a salary cap of A$245,000 per club. Affiliated with the two Western Australia-based AFL clubs, the league is governed by WA Football.

== Clubs ==
The West Australian Football League has a single table system with no divisions, conferences, promotion or relegation.

=== Current clubs ===
| Club | Colours | Nickname | Home ground | Capacity | Former league | Est. | Joined WAFL | Premierships | |
| Club | Colours | Nickname | Home ground | Capacity | Former league | Est. | Joined WAFL | Total | Most Recent |
|---|---|---|---|---|---|---|---|---|---|
| Claremont* | | Tigers | Claremont Oval, Claremont^{[a]} | 5,000 | WAFA | 1906 | 1926* | 12 | 2012 |
| East Fremantle | | Sharks | East Fremantle Oval, East Fremantle^{[b]} | 20,000 | – | 1898 | 1898- | 30 | 2023 |
| East Perth | | Royals | Leederville Oval, Leederville^{[c]} | 18,000 | PFRJA | 1906 | 1906- | 17 | 2002 |
| Peel (A) | | Thunder | Rushton Park, Mandurah | 10,000 | – | 1996 | 1997- | 4 | 2026 |
| Perth | | Demons | Lathlain Park, Lathlain^{[d]} | 6,500 | PFRJA | 1899 | 1899- | 7 | 1977 |
| South Fremantle | | Bulldogs | Fremantle Oval, Fremantle | 17,000 | – | 1900 | 1900- | 15 | 2025 |
| Subiaco | | Lions | Leederville Oval, Leederville^{[e]} | 18,000 | PFRJA | 1896 | 1901- | 16 | 2021 |
| Swan Districts | | Swans | Bassendean Oval, Bassendean | 22,000 | – | 1934 | 1934- | 8 | 2010 |
| West Coast (R) | | Eagles | Lathlain Park, Lathlain^{[g]} | 6,500 | – | 2019 | 2019- | 0 | - |
| West Perth | | Falcons | Arena Joondalup, Joondalup^{[f]} | 16,000 | – | 1891 | 1891- | 20 | 2022 |

^{a} Played at the Claremont Showground from 1925 to 1927 and from 2014 to 2016 when Claremont Oval was closed for re-development, and at Subiaco Oval from 1945 to 1947 when Claremont Oval was rebuilt after a 1944 grandstand fire. Known as Claremont-Cottesloe from 1926 to 1934.
^{b} Played at Fremantle Oval from 1898 to 1952 except 1906 (when home games were played at East Fremantle Oval), and at the WACA Ground (in 2022 and 2023), Fremantle Oval (2024) and Claremont Oval (2024) whilst East Fremantle Oval is re-developed.
^{c} Played at Wellington Square from 1902 to 1909, at Perth Oval from 1910 to 1987 and 1990 to 1999, and at the WACA Ground during 1988 and 1989. East Perth were affiliated with West Coast from 2014 to 2018.
^{d} Played at the WACA Ground from 1899 to 1958, and during 1987 and 1988.
^{e} Played at Shenton Park from 1901 to 1905, at Mueller Park in 1906 and 1907, and at Subiaco Oval from 1908 to 2003.
^{f} Played at Leederville Oval from 1915 to 1993.
^{g} Primarily play away games, and often sell their home matches to other clubs. When they play home games, they are at their training base at Lathlain Park.

- (R) Reserves team of a senior club of the AFL
- (A) Affiliated team of a senior club of the AFL

^{*} Claremont known as Claremont-Cottesloe from 1926 to 1934.
^{*} Peel have been aligned with Fremantle since 2014.
^{*} Perth was known as Victoria Park from 1934 to 1935.

=== Uniforms ===
| Claremont | East Fremantle | East Perth | Peel | Perth |
| South Fremantle | Subiaco | Swan Districts | West Coast | West Perth |

=== Former clubs ===
Eleven other clubs formerly competed in the league.

| Club | Colours | Nickname(s) | Home ground(s) | Former League | Est. | Years in WAFL | WAFL Premierships | | Fate |
| Club | Colours | Nickname(s) | Home ground(s) | Former League | Est. | Years in WAFL | Total | Most Recent | Fate |
|---|---|---|---|---|---|---|---|---|---|
| Centrals | | | None/Unknown^{[h]} | – | 1891 | 1891–1891 | 0 | - | Folded after 1891 season |
| East Perth (I) | | | None/Unknown^{[h]} | – | 1891 | 1891–1892 | 0 | - | Folded after 1892 season |
| Fremantle (I) | | Fremantleites | Barrack Green, Fremantle | – | 1882 | 1885–1886 | 1 | 1886 | Folded after 1886 season |
| High School | | Students | High School Grounds, Wembley Downs | – | 1885 | 1885–1885 | 0 | - | Folded two rounds into 1885 season due to lack of players |
| Imperials | | Blue and Whites | Esplanade Park, Fremantle | WAJFA | 1892 | 1895–1897 | 0 | - | Replaced by East Fremantle after the 1897 season |
| Metropolitan | | | | – | 1889 | 1889-1890 | 0 | - | Replaced by West Perth after the 1890 season |
| Midland Junction | | Midlanders, Railways | Midland Junction Oval, Midland | PFRJA | | 1905–1910; 1914–1917 | 0 | - | Folded after the 1917 season |
| North Fremantle | | Magpies | North Fremantle Oval, North Fremantle | PFRJA | 19th century | 1901–1915 | 0 | - | Folded after the 1915 season; reformed in 1921, now in the Perth Football League |
| Rovers | | Rovers, Tigers | None/Unknown^{[h]}^{[i]} | – | 1882 | 1885–1899 | 2 | 1891 | Folded after the first 8 rounds of the 1899 season |
| Unions/ Fremantle (II)* | | Ports, Fremantleites | Fremantle Park and Fremantle Oval, Fremantle | – | 1882 | 1886–1899 | 10 | 1898 | Folded after 1899 season |
| Victorian | | | | – | 1885 | 1885-1888 | 0 | - | Merged with West Australian to form Metropolitan after 1888 season |
| West Australian | | Wests | New Recreation Ground, Perth^{[h]} | – | 1886 | 1887–1888 | 0 | - | Merged with Victorian to form Metropolitan after 1888 season |

^{*} Fremantle Football Club (II) was known as Unions Football Club from 1886 to 1889.
^{*} West Australian (1887–1888) merged with Victorians (1885–1888) in 1889 to form the Metropolitan Football Club (1889–1890), which in turn became the West Perth Football Club in 1891
^{h} Until the turn of the century, there were a limited number of grounds available for the clubs; all clubs shared the different grounds. Esplanade Park and Fremantle Park in Fremantle, and the Old Recreation Ground (Wellington Square) and New Recreation Ground (Esplanade Reserve) in Perth were used as "home" grounds by the above teams.
^{i} Rovers were a "wandering" team; they had no home ground, and drew players from throughout the metropolitan area.

=== Former-club uniforms ===
| Centrals | East Perth (I) | Fremantle (I) | High School | Imperials | Metropolitan |
| Midland Junction | North Fremantle | Rovers | Unions/Fremantle | Victorian | West Australian |

== Venues ==
| Bassendean | West Australian Football League is located in Perth | East Fremantle |
|---|---|---|
| Bassendean Oval | West Australian Football League is located in Perth | East Fremantle Oval |
| Capacity: 22,000 | West Australian Football League is located in Perth | Capacity: 20,000 |
| Lathlain | West Australian Football League is located in Perth | Leederville |
| Lathlain Park | West Australian Football League is located in Perth | Leederville Oval |
| Capacity: 20,000 | West Australian Football League is located in Perth | Capacity: 18,000 |
| Fremantle | West Australian Football League is located in Perth | Claremont |
| Fremantle Oval | West Australian Football League is located in Perth | Claremont Oval |
| Capacity: 17,000 | West Australian Football League is located in Perth | Capacity: 5,000 |
| Mandurah | West Australian Football League is located in Perth | Joondalup |
| Rushton Park | West Australian Football League is located in Perth | Arena Joondalup |
| Capacity: 10,000 | West Australian Football League is located in Perth | Capacity: 10,000 |

== Salary cap ==
Although players are paid, the WAFL is considered a semi-professional league with a salary cap in place and Total Player Payments (TPP) of about A$245,000. This is the third-highest Australian rules football salary cap, after the AFL and SANFL. Each WAFL club has two squads of 22 players. In 2023, this averaged about A$5,000 per player per season; however, some players may be paid much more than this.

| Year | TPP | (AFL aligned clubs) |
|---|---|---|
| 2023 | 245,000 | |
| 2016 | 294,000 | 191,000 |
| 2012 | 217,000 | - |

== Audience ==
=== Media ===
==== Television ====
The WAFL signed a 2022 agreement to broadcast 26 games (including all finals matches) on the Seven Network, with the remaining 72 matches available for streaming on the AFL's app and AFL On Demand service. In January 2015, the league announced a three-year agreement with the Seven Network for the telecast of 18 home and away matches and all finals matches throughout Western Australia. Before this, the WAFL match of the round was broadcast on ABC in Western Australia every Saturday afternoon during the regular home-and-away season. Matches were replayed nationwide on demand by the ABC iView service and re-broadcast on the ABC2 channel on early Friday mornings.

==== Radio ====
Radio stations which cover the league include ABC Radio Perth, ABC Radio Grandstand Digital, 91.3 SportFM, 107.3 HFM and KIX Country Digital.

=== Sponsorship ===
The WAFL is sponsored by Western Australia-based Sullivan Logistics, who signed a four-year naming-rights deal in 2025. This ended a three-year period with no naming-rights sponsor; previous sponsors were Optus (2019–2021), McDonald's (2015–2018) and AAMI (2010–2014).

=== Attendance ===
Attendance at WAFL matches dropped when each of the two Western Australian-based AFL teams entered the league. Attendance has increased slightly, with 2009 recording the first combined annual attendance of more than 200,000 since 1994.

The largest recent crowd was 29,879 at the 2021 WAFL Grand Final between Subiaco and South Fremantle at Optus Stadium. The all-time attendance record is 52,781 in 1979 for East Fremantle v South Fremantle at Subiaco Oval.

| Year | # Games played* | H & A total | H & A average | Finals total | Finals average | Total | Average | Grand Final |
|---|---|---|---|---|---|---|---|---|
| 2024 | 90 | 151,060 | 1,678 | 46,620 | 7,770 | 197,680 | 2,059 | 25,481 |
| 2023 | 90 | 142,120 | 1,519 | 43,737 | 7,290 | 185,857 | 1,936 | 27,104 |
| 2022 | 96 | 141,176 | 1,569 | 34,932 | 5,822 | 176,108 | 1,834 | 16,791 |
| 2021 | 96 | 143,454 | 1,594 | 50,204 | 8,367 | 193,658 | 2,017 | 29,879 |
| 2020 | 40 | 72,301 | 2,008 | 22,038 | 5,510 | 94,339 | 2,558 | 10,179 |
| 2019 | 96 | 148,281 | 1,648 | 32,677 | 5,446 | 180,958 | 1,885 | 18,941 |
| 2018 | 87 | 139,673 | 1,724 | 42,128 | 7,021 | 181,801 | 2,090 | 25,064 |
| 2017 | | | | 36,678 | | | | 18,180 |
| 2016 | | | | 31,599 | | | | 15,031 |
| 2015 | | | | 30,114 | | | | 13,094 |
| 2014 | | | | 21,035 | | | | 11,987 |
| 2013 | | | | 32,565 | | | 1,694 | 20,008 |
| 2012 | | | | 31,376 | | | | 18,612 |
| 2011 | | 199,002 | | 24,399 | | | | 15,459 |
| 2010 | | 201,225 | | 46,861 | | 249,269 | | 24,638 |
| 2009 | | | | 37,365 | | 245,289 | | 22,738 |
| 2008 | 94 | | | 38,673 | | 219,205 | 2,332 | 23,199 |
| 2007 | 94 | | | 32301 | | 207,304 | 2,205 | 19,541 |
| 2006 | 94 | 173,768 | | 34,488 | | 208,347 | 2,216 | 21,287 |
| 2005 | | 164,822 | | 37,889 | | 198,000 | 2,106 | 22,570 |
| 2004 | | 163,140 | | 41,011 | | 202,797 | 2,157 | 21,507 |
| 2003 | | | | 35,871 | | | | 17,750 |
| 2002 | | | | 47,582 | | | | 31,382 |

*Includes finals games Source(s):

== History ==
=== Before 1900: Formation and early years ===
During the 1880s, the discovery of gold in the Kimberley, Pilbara and Murchison regions led to an increase in Western Australia's population; this included players and supporters of Australian Rules from the eastern colonies. In 1887 Fremantle left the WAFA and the West Australian Football Club joined, but they only played two seasons before they disappeared. Three years later, Unions renamed themselves Fremantle. 1891 saw two new clubs (Centrals and East Perth) for one and two seasons, respectively. In 1898, East Fremantle joined the league. The following season was Fremantle's last. Unions were the WAFA's top club, winning 10 championships in their 13 years of existence, but debt was a problem and some personnel formed South Fremantle Football Club in its place. Despite many involved with Fremantle moving to South Fremantle, the new club is not a continuation of the old and did not claim its records.

That season was also the Rovers' last. The regionalisation which saw Unions take on the old Fremantle's name and colours made it difficult for a club which did not represent a particular area to attract players. They were replaced by the Perth Football Club, who were promoted from the Perth First Rate Association.

=== Early 1900s ===
Gold discoveries at Coolgardie and Kalgoorlie in 1892, coupled with an international economic depression, increased immigration from the eastern colonies to the Goldfields and Perth. The migrants came from where Australian rules football was more popular and included a number of players.

The Goldfields Football League was comparable in status and standard to the Perth league for a number of years, and had a seat on the Australian National Football Council until 1919. The higher standard of play helped increase the game's popularity and improved the WAFA's professionalism.

In 1901, the WAFA had six teams. By 1906, there were eight teams:

- West Perth
- East Perth
- East Fremantle
- South Fremantle
- North Fremantle
- Subiaco
- Perth
- Midland Junction

On 27 March 1907, the WAFA was renamed the West Australian Football League (WAFL). East Fremantle was the league's dominant force, winning 11 premierships between 1900 and 1918. The West Australian State Premiership was awarded to the winner of a game between the Goldfields premiers and the WAFL premiers. The championship was played intermittently between 1903 and 1924, and the winning team were Champions of Western Australia. The WAFL continued playing during World War I, although two teams (North Fremantle and Midland Junction) competed for the last time in 1915 and 1917 respectively.

=== Interwar period and World War II ===
In 1919, East Perth won their first of five consecutive premierships. In 1921, The WAFL, emulating the SANFL's Magarey Medal, introduced the Sandover Medal in 1921 for the season's fairest and best player according to the field umpires. The medal has been awarded annually ever since.

Claremont-Cottesloe entered the league in 1926, bringing the number of teams back up to seven. The club was renamed Claremont several few years later.

On 12 October 1927, the WAFL was renamed the Western Australian National Football League (WANFL). The "national" concept in the name was adopted by the SANFL, the TANFL and other leagues when the Australian Football Council became the Australian National Football Council earlier in the year. Swan Districts entered the league in 1934.

Because of World War II, the league only operated "under age" between 1942 and 1944. The three premierships won during this period have equal status in official records, but East Perth do not give their 1944 premiership win equal status. All clubs competed except for Swan Districts, who could not form a team in 1942 but returned in 1943.

=== Post-war period ===
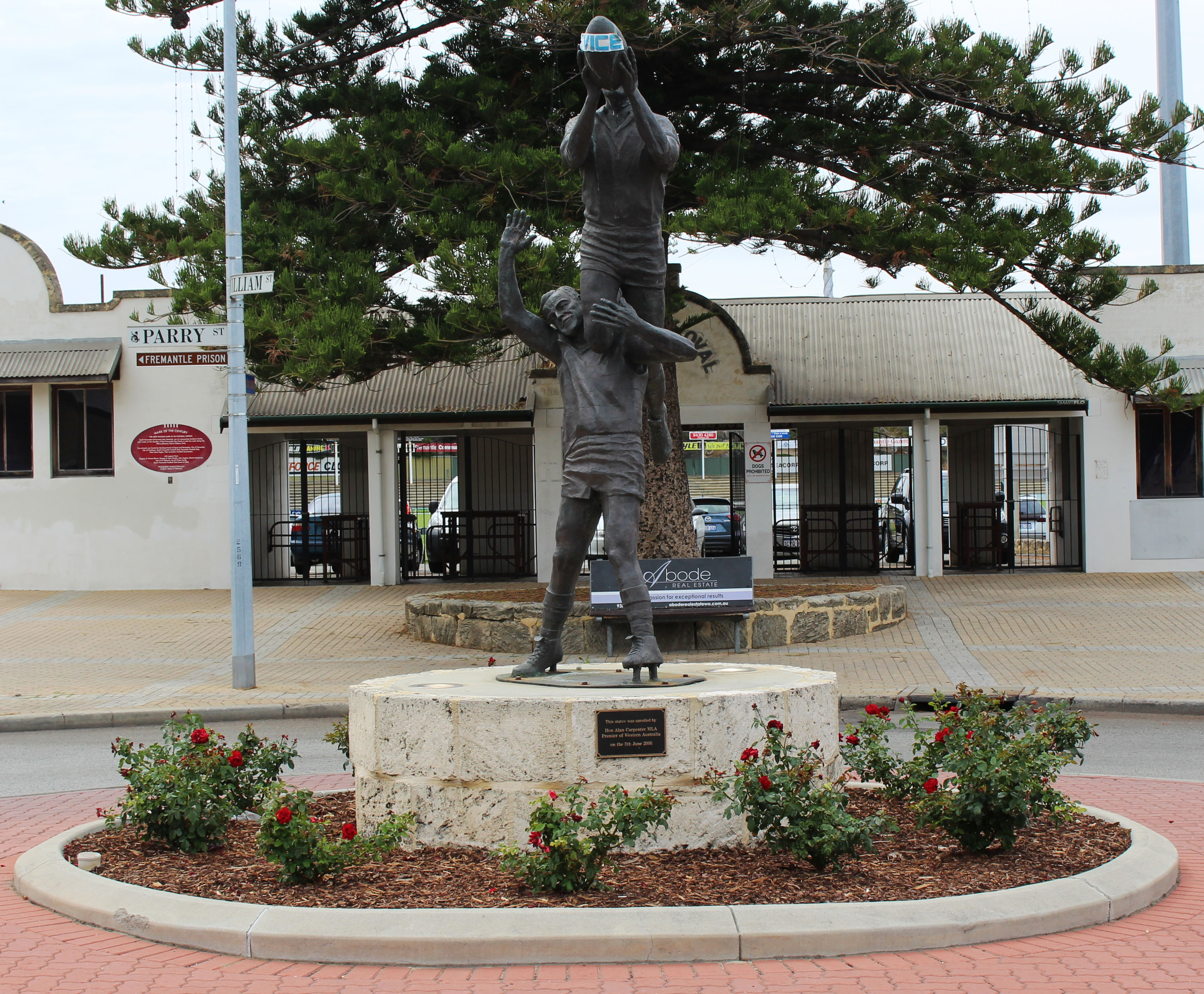
Statue of the mark by South Fremantle's John Gerovich over East Fremantle's Ray French at the 1956 WAFL preliminary final

Western Australian football was particularly strong during the years immediately after World War II. The state side had unparalleled success, downing Victoria in each of the first three post-war meetings as well and defeating South Australia.

Several attempts were made to expand the league during the late 1940s and early 1950s, and WANFL secretary Billy Orr supported the admission of teams from Inglewood and South Perth. In 1951, the league established a recruiting district in Inglewood in anticipation of a new club at Inglewood Oval. The Inglewood Football Club was established in 1953 with support from three local amateur clubs and former East Perth player Herbie Screaigh. That year, it applied for admission to the WANFL reserves league for the following season. By 1954, however, the league had announced that it would expand East Perth's zone to include the Inglewood district.

South Fremantle were one of Australia's strongest teams during much of the period from 1947 to 1954, winning six premierships and defeating a number of touring sides from Victoria and South Australia. In 1952, the Avon Valley Football Association applied to enter the WANFL in the wake of concerns about its players being poached by Perth-based teams. The club would have been based at Northam's Jubilee Oval. The proposal was raised again in 1954, but it did not proceed. East Perth dominated the WAFL from 1956 to 1961, winning three of their six Grand Final appearances. The team featured Graham Farmer, who left at the end of the 1961 season for the VFL and carved out a reputation as one of the game's greatest-ever players.

East Perth's 1961 loss to Swan Districts gave the latter its first-ever premiership. Captained and coached by Haydn Bunton Jr., they followed up in 1962 and 1963 for three in a row. Attendance increased during the 1960s, but more star WAFL players wanted to move to the Victorian Football League (VFL) for more money and greater prestige. In 1977, however (when the first state-of-origin match was played), Western Australia defeated Victoria.

The dominating sides of the late 1960s and early 1970s were the three Perth teams. Perth won three in a row from 1966 to 1968; West Perth won in 1969 and 1971, captained and coached by Graham Farmer. All five of grand-final wins were against East Perth, who finally won in 1972.

Competition was more evenly matched after 1972, with every team winning a grand final over the next 10 years. The 1979 grand final, played before a record crowd of 52,781, saw East Fremantle defeat South Fremantle.

=== 1980s ===
In 1980, the WANFL dropped the "N (National)" and the "ern" from "West" and became the WAFL. At the end of the season, East Perth put in an application to join the VFL which it later withdrew.

By 1983, the WAFL management acknowledged that an economic crisis loomed. They approached the state government for financial aid and received a grant of A$1.9 million, equivalent to A$6.8 million in 2022. In response, the government wanted an investigation of the probable future financial demands of football. This led to the formation of the West Australian Football Commission, who were independent of the WAFL.

In 1986 it was decided that the WAFL needed to become involved in helping the VFL, where several clubs were also struggling financially, to become national. The league decided to hastily form a new club to enter the VFL and retain a West Australian presence.

Swan Districts won another hat trick of premierships, from 1982 to 1984. East Fremantle, the WAFL's most successful club, won the centenary premiership in 1985. The following year, Subiaco was the last club to win the premiership before Western Australia's participation in the national league.

=== VFL expansion and the AFL ===
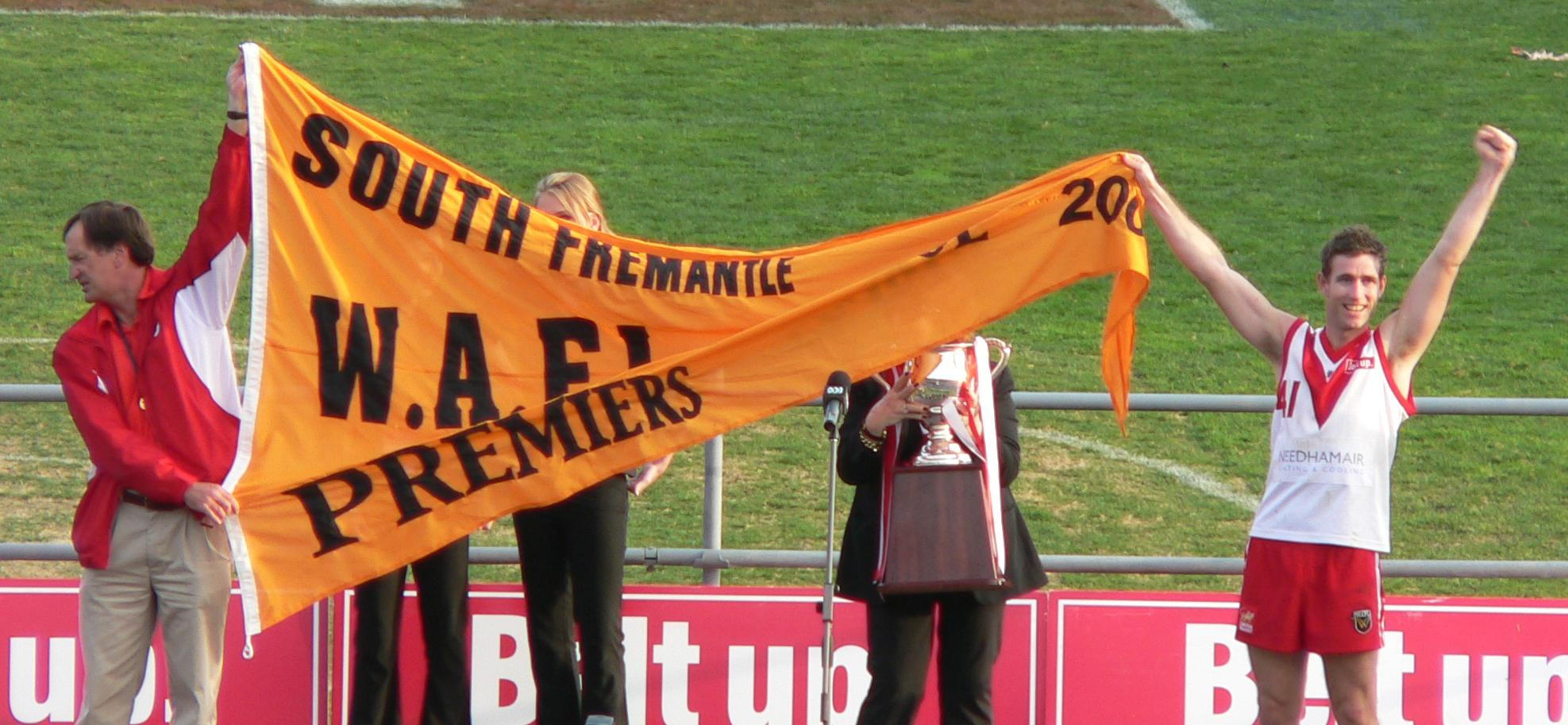
South Fremantle Football Club celebrate with flag and cup after winning the 2005 WAFL Premiership.

The West Coast Eagles were formed and competed in the VFL for the first time in 1987. The VFL was renamed the AFL in 1990.

With many of Western Australia's best players now competing on a team representing Western Australia on a national scale, attention focused on the "national" league. In 1990, the league was renamed the Western Australian State Football League; it returned to WAFL the following season.

Another locally-based AFL team, the Fremantle Football Club, were formed in 1994. The 1991 introduction of the Adelaide Crows to the AFL indicated that SANFL was experiencing a similar decline.

In 1997, Peel Thunder became the ninth WAFL club. Throughout their brief history, they struggled to compete with the traditional eight clubs; having an odd number of teams forced one team to have a bye each week. That year, the league was renamed Westar Rules in an attempt to revamp its image. The name again reverted to WAFL in 2001, when the Fong Report called "Westar Rules" a painfully-contrived name.

Attendance has recovered slightly, and in 2004 the league had a total attendance of 202,797. Total attendance, including AFL games, was a record 1,030,000.

=== Future ===
The most hoped-for expansion team was to be from Darwin, Northern Territory, formed as a representative club of the Northern Territory Football League, but the NT team opted to join the Queensland Australian Football League for the 2009 season and moved to the new North East Australian Football League in 2011 after the top divisions of the Queensland AFL and AFL Canberra merged.

In 2019, the WAFL partnered with the West Australian Women's Football League to create WAFL Women's. The league is run adjacent to the WAFL premiership.

== Awards and records ==
=== Awards ===
The following awards are (or were) awarded each season:

- The WAFL Premiership Cup for the winner of the WAFL Grand Final
- The Sandover Medal for the league's fairest and best player(s)
- The Simpson Medal for the best players in the Grand Final
- The Bernie Naylor Medal for the leading goal-kicker during the home-and-away season
- The JJ Leonard Medal to the best coach
- The Montgomery Medal, to the best field umpire
- The RP Rodriguez Shield for the best overall team, combining league, reserves and colts games
- The Prendergast Medal for the fairest and best reserves player(s)
- The Jack Clarke Medal for the fairest and best colts player(s)
- The WA State Premiership (1903–1924), awarded to the winner of a match between the WAFA/WAFL premiers and the GFA/GFL premiers

=== Premierships ===
East Fremantle has won the most premierships (30), most recently in 2023. West Perth rank second with 20 premierships, their most recent in 2022. The first premiership was awarded in 1885 to the Rovers Football Club, which disbanded in 1899.

=== Wooden spoons ===
Subiaco and Swan Districts are tied for the most wooden spoons with 21 each. Swan Districts' received their most-recent wooden spoon in 2019, and Subiaco received their most recent in 1996. The most recent team to receive the wooden spoon (2026) is West Perth, with their first wooden spoon since 1992.

=== Records ===
==== Team records ====
- Highest score: 40.18 (258) – South Fremantle v West Perth 12.6 (78) at Fremantle Oval, Round 21, 1981
- Lowest score (since 1898):
  - 0.0 (0) – Subiaco v South Fremantle 12.23 (95) at North Fremantle Oval, 4 August 1906
  - 0.0 (0) – Peel Thunder v Claremont 17.15 (117) at Rushton Park, 2004 (Note: Peel scored 10.10 (70) in the match, but their score was deleted as a penalty for playing a player with an incorrect clearance.)
- Most premierships (club): 30 (East Fremantle)
- Most wooden spoons: 21 (Subiaco, Swan Districts)
- Most successive finals appearances: 36 (East Fremantle, 1916–1951)
- Most consecutive unbeaten games: 35 (East Fremantle, 1945–1947)
- Most consecutive winless games: 27 (Subiaco, 1903–1905)
- Most Sandover Medals (club): 18 (East Perth)
- Most Bernie Naylor Medals/Leading Goalkicker Awards (club): 21 (Subiaco)
- Highest attendance: 52,781 at Subiaco Oval, 1979 WANFL Grand Final (East Fremantle v South Fremantle)

==== Individual records ====
- Most games: 367 – Mel Whinnen (West Perth) (Note: All figures for games and goals refer to premiership (home-and-away and finals) matches only.)
- Most consecutive games: 218 – Joel Cornelius (Swan Districts), 1995–2006
- Most goals: 1,211 – Austin Robertson, Jr. (Subiaco)
- Most goals in a season: 167 – Bernie Naylor (South Fremantle), 1953
- Most goals in a game: 23 – Bernie Naylor (South Fremantle) v Subiaco, 1953
- Most Sandover Medals (player): 4 – Bill Walker (Swan Districts), 1965–1967, 1970
- Most Bernie Naylor Medals/Leading Goalkicker Awards (player): 8 – Austin Robertson Jr. (Subiaco), 1962; 1964–1965; 1968–1972
- Oldest player: Age 44
- Youngest player: Age 14 years, 25 days – Stan Hussey (Centrals), 1891

== West Australian Football Hall of Fame ==
On 12 March 2004, the West Australian Football Hall of Fame was formed when 81 former players, coaches, umpires, administrators and media representatives were inducted. More people have been inducted every year since.

=== Top 25 Players over the Past 25 years ===
In March 2012, the Top 25 players over the Past 25 Years were announced to recognise the WAFL performances of players rather than the performances of Western Australian players in the AFL. Judges were The West Australian sports reporter Ross Lewis, Football Budget editor Tracey Lewis, Claremont CEO Todd Shimmon, former players Clint Roberts, Bill Monaghan and Todd Ridley, and historians Greg Wardell-Johnson and Steve Davies.

| Player | WAFL clubs |
|---|---|
| Marty Atkins | South Fremantle |
| Shane Beros | Swan Districts |
| Stephen Bilcich | East Fremantle |
| Brad Bootsma | South Fremantle |
| Jaxon Crabb | Claremont |
| Ian Dargie | Subiaco |
| Willie Dick | Perth |
| Travis Edmonds | Swan Districts |
| Craig Edwards | East Perth, South Fremantle |
| Mark Hann | Claremont |
| Anthony Jones | Claremont, South Fremantle |
| Steve Malaxos | Claremont, East Fremantle |
| Toby McGrath | South Fremantle |
| Paul Mifka | West Perth |
| Kris Miller | East Fremantle, South Fremantle |
| Darrell Panizza | Claremont |
| Aidan Parker | Subiaco |
| Allistair Pickett | West Perth, Peel Thunder, Subiaco |
| Kim Rigoll | West Perth |
| Jason Salecic | West Perth |
| Brad Smith | Subiaco |
| Craig Treleven | East Fremantle |
| Ryan Turnbull | Claremont, East Perth |
| Marc Webb | Perth, Subiaco |
| Rod Wheatley | East Perth |

== Other WAFL competitions ==
The WAFL has run a simultaneous reserves competition and colts (under-19s) competition for its clubs since 1925 and 1957, respectively. A fourths-grade premiership was held between 1965 and 1974. A senior women's competition began in 2019.

== See also ==
- Australian rules football in Western Australia
- West Australian State Premiership
