= List of South Fremantle Football Club coaches =

There have been 43 coaches in the 116-year history of the South Fremantle Football Club, a West Australian Football League (WAFL) club.

Todd Curley is the longest serving coach, completing his tenth season in 2024 after winning the premiership in 2020. Clive Lewington coached the club for nine seasons, winning the premiership four times. John Todd (one premiership), Mal Brown (one premiership), John Dimmer (two premierships) and Joe Coates (two premierships) each coached the team in eight seasons.

== Coaches ==
Order	Coach	Seasons	Games	Comments
1	Jack Leckie	1911		Captain-coach, former captain of Perth
2	Bert Banks	1912		Previously captain in 1909
3	Joe Coates	1913–20		1916 & 1917 premiership coach, South Fremantle Hall of Fame member
4	Tom Cain	1921, 27		
5	Billy Craig	1922		
6	Bill McGilvray	1923		
7	Percy Youlden	1924		Part year
8	Tom Bell	1924		Part year, previously played for Essendon
9	Tom Sullivan	1925		Part year
10	Dolph Heinrichs	1925		Part year, numerous spellings of his surname exist
11	Jerry Sunderland	1926, 28		
12	Norm McIntosh	1929, 33	38	
13	Paddy Hebbard	1930–31	19	
14	Ron Doig	1932		Doig died from injuries sustained during the 1932 first semi-final, South Fremantle Hall of Fame member
15	Ron Edgar	1934–35		
16	Jack Jones	1936–37		Ron Cooper was appointed as playing coach, but returned to the Eastern States before the season started. Also played for East Fremantle and first class cricket for WA.
17	Bert Chandler	1938–39		
18	Keith Shea	1940		
19	John Bowe	1941		
20	Roy Poole	1942		Underage competition
21	Don Smith	1943	17	Underage competition
22	Bill Davey	1944	19	Underage competition, listed as A Davies in SFFC yearbook, winless season
23	Neil Lewington	1945–46	30	Capt-coach in 1945, non playing in 1946, resigned mid-year, South Fremantle Hall of Fame member
24	Jim Ditchburn	1946	13	Appointed mid-year following Lewington's resignation
25	Ross Hutchinson	1947–49	62	1947, 1948 premiership coach, West Australian Football Hall of Fame inductee
26	Clive Lewington	1950–58	201	1950, 1952, 1953, 1954 premiership coach, South Fremantle and West Australian Football Hall of Fame inductee
27	John Todd	1959, 1966–68, 1995–98	172	1997 premiership coach, South Fremantle, West Australian and Australian Football Hall of Fame inductee
28	Marty McDonnell	1960–63	86	
29	Ray Sorrell	1964–65	42	West Australian Football Hall of Fame inductee
30	Hassa Mann	1969–71	65	1970 premiership coach, Australian Football Hall of Fame inductee
31	Mal Atwell	1972–73	42	West Australian Football Hall of Fame inductee
32	Colin Beard	1974–76	70	
33	Percy Johnson	1977	23	West Australian Football Hall of Fame inductee
34	Mal Brown	1978–84, 92	189	1980 premiership coach, West Australian Football Hall of Fame inductee
35	Don Haddow	1985–86	42	
36	Stan Magro	1987–90	89	
37	Steve Hargrave	1991	21	
38	Mark Watson	1993–94	43	
39	Tony Micale	1999	22	
40	Peter Sumich	2000–01	39	
41	John Northey	2002–03	38	
42	John Dimmer	2004–11	151	2005 & 2009 premiership coach
43	Paul Hasleby	2012–14	60	
44	Todd Curley	2015–2024	197	2020 premiership coach
45	Craig White	2025–		
source: South Fremantle Football Club 2013 Yearbook, page 51; Games coached
