= 1934 WANFL season =

Australian rules football season

- Teams: 8
- Premiers: West Perth; 6th premiership
- Minor premiers: East Fremantle; 21st minor premiership
- Sandover Medallist: Sammy Clarke (Claremont-Cottesloe)
- Leading goalkicker: George Doig (East Fremantle)
- Matches played: 88

The 1934 WANFL season was the 50th season of the various incarnations of the Western Australian National Football League. Following upon numerous unsuccessful attempts to revive Midland Junction during the 1920s, Bassendean-based Swan Districts were admitted to the competition. The black and whites were more competitive than previous new clubs owing to the presence of a number of players with previous WANFL experience, including Fred Sweetapple from West Perth, captain-coach "Judda" Bee from East Fremantle and Nigel Gorn from South Fremantle, but after five promising campaigns were to endure nineteen open-age seasons without once winning as many matches as they lost.

The 1934 season saw the only finals success during the inter-war period for Perth, who became known as 'Victoria Park' for this season and the following as the Redlegs planned to develop a new oval at Raphael Park. Because Parliament failed to pass an Act to allow the club to acquire Raphael Park, however, Perth reverted to their old name two seasons later. Subiaco, after a stirring run to the 1933 Grand Final, fell to their worst season since 1922 due to the loss of Westy Gilbert and major injuries to Bill Brophy, Bill Bant, Lloyd Strack, Norm Stehn, Les Mills and Syd Briggs, whilst West Perth under the coaching of ex-Maroon Johnny Leonard were to win a second flag in three seasons over East Fremantle. Old Easts won a seventh successive minor premiership (Note: The nearest comparable feat would be Melbourne's six straight minor premierships between 1955 and 1960 or Port Adelaide's six minor premierships with a combined total of ten minor round losses between 1909 and 1915.) but gave a surprisingly poor display in the Grand Final.

The 1934 season is most famous, however, for the unprecedented goalkicking success, despite some exceptionally wet Saturdays, of spearheads George Doig and Ted Tyson, both of whom completely smashed previous WANFL goalkicking records. In the end, despite neither achieving much on a windy day in the Grand Final, Doig finished with 152 goals and Tyson with 143, tallies not bettered until Bernie Naylor did so in the early 1950s.

== Clubs ==
| Club | Coach | Captain | Best and fairest | Leading goalkicker |
|---|---|---|---|---|
| Claremont-Cottesloe | "Nugget" Gepp; Pat Rodriguez | Keith Hough | Sammy Clarke | Albert Skinner (40) |
| East Fremantle | Carlisle Jarvis | Carlisle Jarvis | Carlisle Jarvis | George Doig (152) |
| East Perth | Jerry Dolan | Jerry Dolan | Herbie Screaigh | Herbie Screaigh (34) |
| South Fremantle | Ron Edgar | Ron Edgar | J Ditchburn | |
| Subiaco | Arthur Green | G. Smith | G. Smith; John Bowe | Jack Jennings (92) |
| Swan Districts | "Judder" Bee | "Judder" Bee | George Krepp | Nigel Gorn (45) |
| Victoria Park | William Truscott | Hedley Hungerford | | Albert Gook (83) |
| West Perth | Johnny Leonard | Don Marinko | | Ted Tyson (143) |

== Home-and-away season ==
=== Round 1 ===
| | Round 1 |
| Saturday, 28 April (2:45 pm) | East Fremantle 16.23 (119) | def. | Swan Districts 16.6 (102) | Fremantle Oval |
| Saturday, 28 April (2:45 pm) | Subiaco 10.14 (74) | def. by | South Fremantle 17.14 (116) | Subiaco Oval |
| Saturday, 28 April (2:45 pm) | Claremont-Cottesloe 5.13 (43) | def. by | East Perth 14.13 (97) | Claremont Oval |
| Saturday, 28 April (2:45 pm) | Victoria Park 10.13 (73) | def. by | West Perth 15.19 (109) | WACA Ground |
Swan Districts made their debut in the league, losing by 17 points to East Fremantle, with George Doig kicking eight goals.

=== Round 2 (Labour Day) ===
| | Round 2 |
| Saturday, 5 May (2:45 pm) | Swan Districts 19.9 (123) | def. | Subiaco 10.14 (74) | Bassendean Oval |
| Saturday, 5 May (2:45 pm) | Victoria Park 15.17 (107) | def. | Claremont-Cottesloe 11.12 (78) | WACA Ground |
| Saturday, 5 May (2:45 pm) | East Fremantle 20.21 (141) | def. | South Fremantle 7.9 (51) | Fremantle Oval |
| Monday, 7 May (2:45 pm) | East Perth 11.11 (77) | def. | West Perth 5.13 (43) | Perth Oval |
Swan Districts won their first WANFL game, which was also the first game played at Bassendean Oval.

=== Round 3 ===
| | Round 3 |
| Saturday 12 May (2:45 pm) | Subiaco 10.7 (67) | def. by | East Fremantle 18.15 (123) | Subiaco Oval |
| Saturday 12 May (2:45 pm) | East Perth 8.18 (66) | def. by | Victoria Park 11.16 (82) | Perth Oval |
| Saturday 12 May (2:45 pm) | South Fremantle 12.18 (90) | def. by | Swan Districts 16.10 (106) | Fremantle Oval |
| Saturday 12 May (2:45 pm) | West Perth 13.17 (95) | def. | Claremont-Cottesloe 9.13 (67) | Leederville Oval |
George Doig kicks another nine goals, whilst Victoria Park hangs on against East Perth despite not goalling in the final term.

=== Round 4 ===
| | Round 4 |
| Saturday 19 May (2:45 pm) | Victoria Park 27.20 (182) | def. | Swan Districts 9.10 (64) | WACA |
| Saturday 19 May (2:45 pm) | South Fremantle 12.15 (87) | def. | East Perth 11.18 (84) | Fremantle Oval |
| Saturday 19 May (2:45 pm) | West Perth 14.13 (97) | def. | East Fremantle 6.12 (48) | Leederville Oval |
| Saturday 19 May (2:45 pm) | Subiaco 20.23 (143) | def. | Claremont-Cottesloe 5.10 (40) | Subiaco Oval |
Victoria Park fall two points shy of the current record WA(N)FL score set in 1916. Gook kicks eight goals for his first major WANFL performance and veteran Johnston six from a half-forward flank.; West Perth play superbly in a preview of the Grand Final, with George Doig held to two goals.

=== Round 5 ===
| | Round 5 |
| Saturday 26 May (2:45 pm) | West Perth 10.24 (84) | def. | Subiaco 11.15 (81) | Leederville Oval |
| Saturday 26 May (2:45 pm) | Swan Districts 12.15 (87) | def. by | East Perth 13.17 (95) | Bassendean Oval |
| Saturday 26 May (2:45 pm) | Victoria Park 14.13 (97) | def. | South Fremantle 10.10 (70) | WACA |
| Saturday 26 May (2:45 pm) | East Fremantle 16.23 (119) | def. | Claremont-Cottesloe 4.8 (32) | Fremantle Oval |
An inaccurate West Perth overhauls Subiaco, already leaving the 1933 grand finalists in danger of moving out of the running.

=== Round 6 ===
| | Round 6 |
| Saturday 2 June (2:45 pm) | West Perth 20.16 (136) | def. | Swan Districts 10.14 (74) | Leederville Oval |
| Saturday 2 June (2:45 pm) | East Fremantle 12.12 (84) | def. | Victoria Park 9.15 (69) | Fremantle Oval |
| Saturday 2 June (2:45 pm) | Claremont-Cottesloe 11.11 (77) | def. by | South Fremantle 11.13 (79) | Claremont Oval |
| Saturday 2 June (2:45 pm) | East Perth 14.15 (99) | def. | Subiaco 9.8 (62) | Perth Oval |
Tyson kicks thirteen goals in slippery conditions to give the newcomers their third straight loss, whilst East Fremantle end Victoria Park's run of four wins in a row.; Jerry Dolan, who had transferred to the Royals after ten seasons with East Fremantle, returns as a player as East Perth downs Subiaco.

=== Round 7 (Foundation Day) ===
| | Round 7 |
| Monday 4 June (2:45 pm) | South Fremantle 18.12 (120) | def. by | West Perth 16.25 (121) | Fremantle Oval |
| Monday 4 June (2:45 pm) | Victoria Park 15.13 (103) | def. | Subiaco 11.10 (76) | WACA |
| Monday 4 June (2:45 pm) | Claremont-Cottesloe 20.19 (139) | def. | Swan Districts 15.15 (105) | Claremont Oval |
| Monday 4 June (2:45 pm) | East Perth 8.4 (52) | def. by | East Fremantle 16.11 (107) | Perth Oval |
A Rainoldi behind after the bell gives the Cardinals a sixth win, and their only win with two fewer goals.; Skinner kicks ten as a Claremont-Cottesloe team minus Keith Hough and Neilson wins its first game of the season.

=== Round 8 ===
| | Round 8 |
| Saturday 9 June (2:45 pm) | South Fremantle 9.12 (66) | def. by | Subiaco 11.14 (80) | Fremantle Oval |
| Saturday 9 June (2:45 pm) | East Perth 14.13 (97) | def. | Claremont-Cottesloe 9.8 (62) | Perth Oval |
| Saturday 9 June (2:45 pm) | West Perth 9.11 (65) | def. by | Victoria Park 15.10 (100) | Leederville Oval |
| Saturday 9 June (2:45 pm) | Swan Districts 10.5 (65) | def. by | East Fremantle 13.11 (89) | Bassendean Oval |
Victoria Park play their best game for many years in extremely wet conditions with two-day rainfall of 3.82 inches (97 mm) to outplay the leaders with a superb first half of 9.6 (60) to 2.8 (20).; Despite the wet conditions, George Doig maintains his amazing average of eight goals per game.

=== Round 9 ===
| | Round 9 |
| Saturday 16 June (2:45 pm) | Subiaco 16.17 (113) | def. | Swan Districts 10.15 (75) | Subiaco Oval |
| Saturday 16 June (2:45 pm) | West Perth 19.7 (121) | def. | East Perth 13.15 (93) | Leederville Oval |
| Saturday 16 June (2:45 pm) | Claremont-Cottesloe 8.14 (62) | def. by | Victoria Park 17.22 (124) | Claremont Oval |
| Saturday 16 June (2:45 pm) | South Fremantle 10.10 (70) | def. by | East Fremantle 13.22 (100) | Fremantle Oval |

=== Round 10 ===
| | Round 10 |
| Saturday 23 June (2:45 pm) | Claremont-Cottesloe 7.7 (49) | def. by | West Perth 20.18 (138) | Claremont Oval |
| Saturday 23 June (2:45 pm) | Swan Districts 8.14 (62) | def. by | South Fremantle 13.18 (96) | Bassendean Oval |
| Saturday 23 June (2:45 pm) | Victoria Park 12.13 (85) | def. by | East Perth 13.21 (99) | WACA |
| Saturday 23 June (2:45 pm) | East Fremantle 12.19 (91) | def. | Subiaco 7.6 (48) | Fremantle Oval |
East Perth makes an amazing recovery after being forty-one points behind during the first quarter, still a club record.; Ted Tyson kicks eleven goals for the Cardinals.; Old Easts storm home against Subiaco after being outplayed in the first half.

=== Round 11 ===
| | Round 11 |
| Saturday 30 June (2:45 pm) | East Perth 15.11 (101) | def. | South Fremantle 5.17 (47) | Perth Oval |
| Saturday 30 June (2:45 pm) | East Fremantle 13.22 (100) | def. | West Perth 6.3 (39) | Fremantle Oval |
| Saturday 30 June (2:45 pm) | Swan Districts 6.8 (44) | def. by | Victoria Park 13.15 (93) | Bassendean Oval |
| Saturday 30 June (2:45 pm) | Claremont-Cottesloe 7.10 (52) | def. by | Subiaco 11.14 (80) | Claremont Oval |
Swan Districts took the field with only seventeen men against Victoria Park before the injured Krepp and Mosey strip, but still kick their lowest three-quarter time score until 1946 and fifth-lowest on record.; East Fremantle play superbly in awful conditions with 2.80 inches (71 mm) over two days. Tyson is kept to one goal by Woods, whilst the Cardinals cannot cover injuries to key defender Tetley and rover Rainoldi.

=== Round 12 ===
| | Round 12 |
| Saturday 7 July (2:45 pm) | Subiaco 13.12 (90) | def. | West Perth 10.15 (75) | Subiaco Oval |
| Saturday 7 July (2:45 pm) | Claremont-Cottesloe 4.5 (29) | def. by | East Fremantle 12.13 (85) | Claremont Oval |
| Saturday 7 July (2:45 pm) | South Fremantle 10.17 (77) | def. | Victoria Park 9.17 (71) | Fremantle Oval |
| Saturday 7 July (2:45 pm) | East Perth 12.14 (86) | def. | Swan Districts 12.8 (80) | Perth Oval |
Claremont-Cottesloe's score, on a waterlogged ground after another 1.99 inches (50.5 mm) of steady rain during the previous four days remains its lowest-ever against East Fremantle.; A severely depleted West Perth produce an amazing comeback from 13.11 (89) to 3.8 (26) down at three-quarter time to be only 14 points down with five minutes to go before the Maroons – who had not entered attack all quarter – steady.

=== First interstate match ===
First interstate match
Saturday, 14 July (2:45 pm) | Western Australia | def. | South Australia | Perth Oval (crowd: 12,000 (approx.))
7.0 (42); 12.3 (75); 13.4 (82); 15.7 (97) | Q1; Q2; Q3; Final | 0.2 (2); 1.5 (11); 6.5 (41); 7.9 (51) | Umpires: Frank Collins
George Doig 6, Anderson 3, Screaigh 2, Merson 2, Daily, McGlinn | Goals | Farmer 3, Hooper 2, Hender, Parry
Anderson (best on ground), Clarke, Guhl, Taylor, George Doig, Bowe, Screaigh | Best | Dermody, Sallis, Taylor, Parry, Hooper, Hender
In conditions which shocked the South Australians as Adelaide had been experiencing extremely dry weather and dust storms, Western Australia's extraordinary accuracy with a slippery ball – 11.0 (66) to late in the second quarter – ensures the locals an untroubled victory in the first interstate match played in Perth since 1929.

=== Second interstate match ===
Second interstate match
Tuesday, 17 July (2:45 pm) | Western Australia | def. by | South Australia | Leederville Oval (crowd: 10,000 (approx.))
5.2 (32); 8.4 (52); 12.9 (81); 14.14 (98) | Q1; Q2; Q3; Final | 4.6 (30); 6.11 (47); 10.15 (75); 14.19 (103) | Umpires: Frank Collins
George Doig 7, Anderson 2, Merson, Forbes, Ditchburn, Screaigh | Goals | Farmer 4, Hooper 3, Pontifex 2, Hender 2, Munro 2, Walter
Daily, George Doig, Shepherd, Clarke, Fitzgerald, Booth | Best | Dermody (best on ground), Hooper, Burton, Allington, Jarvis, Sallis
Walsh (knee) | Injuries
In conditions totally different from the rainy Saturday, South Australia produce an impressive display to win after being narrowly behind most of the afternoon.

=== Round 13 ===
| | Round 13 |
| Saturday 21 July (2:45 pm) | South Fremantle 19.8 (122) | def. | Claremont-Cottesloe 9.13 (67) | Fremantle Oval |
| Saturday 21 July (2:45 pm) | Subiaco 16.11 (107) | def. by | East Perth 15.18 (108) | Subiaco Oval |
| Saturday 21 July (2:45 pm) | Swan Districts 10.21 (81) | def. | West Perth 10.11 (71) | Bassendean Oval |
| Saturday 21 July (2:45 pm) | Victoria Park 8.7 (55) | def. | East Fremantle 6.15 (51) | WACA |
In a close match of low standard due to the absence of interstate players such as George Doig, Gook, Jarvis, Shepherd, McGlinn and Fitzgerald, Victoria Park move with their narrow win and West Perth's surprise loss to second position.

=== Round 14 ===
| | Round 14 |
| Saturday 28 July (2:45 pm) | East Fremantle 11.12 (78) | def. | East Perth 6.8 (44) | Fremantle Oval |
| Saturday 28 July (2:45 pm) | Swan Districts 8.15 (63) | def. | Claremont-Cottesloe 7.8 (50) | Bassendean Oval |
| Saturday 28 July (2:45 pm) | Subiaco 10.3 (63) | def. by | Victoria Park 16.16 (112) | Subiaco Oval |
| Saturday 28 July (2:45 pm) | West Perth 10.12 (72) | def. | South Fremantle 7.3 (45) | Leederville Oval |
East Fremantle again show their superiority in heavy rain with an 8.5 (53) to 2.4 (16) second half.; West Perth, with Tyson injured, outplay South Fremantle after a hard-fought first half.

=== Round 15 ===
| | Round 15 |
| Saturday 4 August (2:45 pm) | East Fremantle 18.11 (119) | def. | Swan Districts 12.14 (86) | Fremantle Oval |
| Saturday 4 August (2:45 pm) | Subiaco 18.16 (124) | def. | South Fremantle 18.14 (122) | Subiaco Oval |
| Saturday 4 August (2:45 pm) | East Perth 18.22 (130) | def. | Claremont-Cottesloe 13.9 (87) | Perth Oval |
| Saturday 4 August (2:45 pm) | Victoria Park 12.7 (79) | def. by | West Perth 11.14 (80) | WACA |
West Perth win with a brilliant torpedo punt from McGarry after the bell.

=== Round 16 ===
| | Round 16 |
| Saturday 11 August (2:45 pm) | West Perth 19.16 (130) | def. | East Perth 10.17 (77) | Leederville Oval |
| Saturday 11 August (2:45 pm) | South Fremantle 13.12 (90) | def. by | East Fremantle 14.11 (95) | Fremantle Oval |
| Saturday 11 August (2:45 pm) | Swan Districts 21.14 (140) | def. | Subiaco 16.13 (109) | Bassendean Oval |
| Saturday 11 August (2:45 pm) | Claremont-Cottesloe 7.12 (54) | def. by | Victoria Park 20.18 (138) | Claremont Oval |
George Doig kicks his hundredth goal in third quarter, but East Fremantle stops to a walk and just holds on.

=== Round 17 ===
| | Round 17 |
| Saturday 18 August (2:45 pm) | Swan Districts 17.13 (115) | def. | South Fremantle 10.14 (74) | Bassendean Oval |
| Saturday 18 August (2:45 pm) | East Fremantle 14.16 (100) | def. | Subiaco 5.11 (41) | Fremantle Oval |
| Saturday 18 August (2:45 pm) | East Perth 16.14 (110) | def. | Victoria Park 15.11 (101) | Perth Oval |
| Saturday 18 August (2:45 pm) | West Perth 27.10 (172) | def. | Claremont-Cottesloe 6.9 (45) | Leederville Oval |
Ted Tyson kicked fifteen goals, at the time a WA(N)FL record. In doing so, he reaches the hundred as the Cardinals inflict Claremont-Cottesloe's biggest loss until 1952 and still their fourth-biggest ever.

=== Round 18 ===
| | Round 18 |
| Saturday 25 August (2:45 pm) | West Perth 6.13 (49) | def. by | East Fremantle 9.16 (70) | Leederville Oval |
| Saturday 25 August (2:45 pm) | Victoria Park 7.13 (55) | def. by | Swan Districts 10.13 (73) | WACA |
| Saturday 25 August (2:45 pm) | South Fremantle 17.23 (125) | def. | East Perth 12.14 (86) | Fremantle Oval |
| Saturday 25 August (2:45 pm) | Subiaco 17.16 (118) | def. | Claremont-Cottesloe 7.16 (58) | Subiaco Oval |
On another wet Saturday, East Fremantle comfortably account for West Perth even with George Doig only kicking one goal six. The final four is settled with three rounds remaining, and Old Easts seal an unprecedented seventh successive minor premiership.^{[a]}

=== Round 19 ===
| | Round 19 |
| Saturday 1 September (2:45 pm) | East Fremantle 22.15 (147) | def. | Claremont-Cottesloe 5.7 (37) | Fremantle Oval |
| Saturday 1 September (2:45 pm) | Subiaco 11.7 (73) | def. by | West Perth 19.18 (132) | Subiaco Oval |
| Saturday 1 September (2:45 pm) | Swan Districts 10.10 (70) | def. by | East Perth 15.19 (109) | Bassendean Oval |
| Saturday 1 September (2:45 pm) | Victoria Park 22.25 (157) | def. | South Fremantle 12.11 (83) | WACA |
George Doig beats Tyson's record against the Tigers, kicking nineteen of twenty-two goals against that same club, who were handicapped by full-back Batt having an injured hand. It remained a WANFL record until 1953 (Note: Equalled by George Moloney in 1940 and Naylor in 1952.) when Bernie Naylor set the current record of 23 against Subiaco.; Albert Gook kicks seven as Victoria Park lead 19.22 (136) to 6.10 (46) at the last change before easing off.

=== Round 20 ===
| | Round 20 |
| Saturday 8 September (2:45 pm) | Claremont-Cottesloe 16.7 (103) | def. by | South Fremantle 22.20 (152) | Claremont Oval |
| Saturday 8 September (2:45 pm) | East Fremantle 20.15 (135) | def. | Victoria Park 11.8 (74) | Fremantle Oval |
| Saturday 8 September (2:45 pm) | Subiaco 12.13 (85) | drew with | East Perth 11.19 (85) | Subiaco Oval |
| Saturday 8 September (2:45 pm) | West Perth 21.18 (144) | def. | Swan Districts 13.13 (91) | Leederville Oval |
East Fremantle kick 17.12 (114) to 5.4 (34) after quarter-time, with George Doig kicking another thirteen goals. In the process Old Easts seal the finals matchups by depriving Victoria Park of any chance to take second position.

=== Round 21 ===
| | Round 21 |
| Saturday 15 September (2:45 pm) | Claremont-Cottesloe 17.14 (116) | def. | Swan Districts 11.10 (76) | Claremont Oval |
| Saturday 15 September (2:45 pm) | East Perth 13.12 (90) | def. | East Fremantle 6.11 (47) | Perth Oval |
| Saturday 15 September (2:45 pm) | South Fremantle 16.7 (103) | def. by | West Perth 19.8 (122) | Fremantle Oval |
| Saturday 15 September (2:45 pm) | Victoria Park 15.21 (111) | def. | Subiaco 16.14 (110) | WACA |
Speed on a firmer ground gives East Perth an excellent win over East Fremantle.; Claremont-Cottesloe end a run of thirteen straight losses.

== Ladder ==
1934 WANFL ladder
| Pos | Team | Pld | W | L | D | PF | PA | PP | Pts |
|---|---|---|---|---|---|---|---|---|---|
| 1 | East Fremantle | 21 | 18 | 3 | 0 | 2048 | 1287 | 159.1 | 72 |
| 2 | West Perth (P) | 21 | 15 | 6 | 0 | 2122 | 1636 | 129.7 | 60 |
| 3 | East Perth | 21 | 13 | 7 | 1 | 1885 | 1763 | 106.9 | 54 |
| 4 | Victoria Park | 21 | 13 | 8 | 0 | 2068 | 1653 | 125.1 | 52 |
| 5 | South Fremantle | 21 | 8 | 13 | 0 | 1885 | 2055 | 91.7 | 32 |
| 6 | Subiaco | 21 | 7 | 13 | 1 | 1827 | 2015 | 90.7 | 30 |
| 7 | Swan Districts | 21 | 7 | 14 | 0 | 1782 | 2168 | 82.2 | 28 |
| 8 | Claremont-Cottesloe | 21 | 2 | 19 | 0 | 1347 | 2387 | 56.4 | 8 |

Rules for classification: 1) points; 2) percentage; 3) number of points for.
(P) Premiers

== Finals ==
=== First semi-final ===
| | First semi-final |
| Saturday, 22 September (2:45 pm) | East Perth 9.13 (67) | def. by | Victoria Park 13.13 (91) | Leederville Oval (crowd: 6,954) |
This was Victoria Park's first finals win since 1915 when known by their more familiar name of 'Perth', which they reverted to before their next senior finals appearance in 1947.

=== Second semi-final ===
| | Second semi-final |
| Saturday, 29 September (2:45 pm) | East Fremantle 15.13 (103) | def. | West Perth 7.7 (49) | Perth Oval (crowd: 10,748) |

=== Preliminary final ===
| | Preliminary final |
| Saturday, 6 October (2:45 pm) | West Perth 9.14 (68) | def. | Victoria Park 4.9 (33) | Perth Oval (crowd: 8,519) |
Despite the absence of "Checker" O‘Keefe, West Perth crush the Victoria Park attack, with Flemming holding Gook scoreless.

=== Grand Final ===
1934 WANFL Grand Final
Saturday, 13 October (2:45 pm) | East Fremantle | def. by | West Perth | Perth Oval (crowd: 10,464)
2.2 (14); 3.3 (21); 5.6 (36); 5.9 (39) | Q1; Q2; Q3; Final | 1.3 (9); 4.5 (29); 8.7 (55); 11.7 (73) | Umpires: G. Gannon
George Doig 3, Reynolds, McGlinn | Goals | McDiarmid 2, Tyson 2, Anderson 2, Rainoldi 2, Ford, Green, Kenna
Woods, N. Doig, C. Doig, McGlinn, C. James | Best | McDiarmid (best on ground), O‘Keefe, Kenna, Green, Anderson, Morgan
W. James for striking O‘Keefe; W. James for striking Morgan | Reports | Morgan for striking W. James
In a dour struggle, West Perth are unexpectedly far too good for Old Easts, who are saved from a worse thrashing only by full back Dave Woods, who restricts Ted Tyson to 2.2 and kicks brilliantly.
