= 1887 WAFA season =

West Australian football season

- Premiers: Unions; 1st premiership

The 1887 WAFA season was the 3rd season of senior Australian rules football in Perth, Western Australia. The Unions Football Club won its first premiership, and would then go on to dominate the league for the majority of the clubs existence.

== Ladder ==
1887 ladder
Pos	Team	Pld	W	L	D	GF	GA	GD	Pts
1	Unions (P)	9	7	2	0	15	8	+7	14
2	Victorians	8	4	3	1	12	8	+4	9
3	Rovers	9	3	5	1	15	19	−4	7
4	West Australian	8	2	6	0	4	11	−7	4

Source: WAFL Footy Facts
Rules for classification: 1) points; 2) percentage; 3) number of points for.
(P) Premiers
