= 1889 WAFA season =

West Australian football season

- Premiers: Unions; 3rd premiership

The 1889 WAFA season was the 5th season of senior Australian rules football in Perth, Western Australia. The Unions Football Club won its third premiership of a four-peat. This season marks the first where less than four teams are competing, after the Victorians and West Australian football clubs merged, to create the Metropolitans Football Club.

== Ladder ==
1889 ladder
Pos	Team	Pld	W	L	D	GF	GA	GD	Pts
1	Unions (P)	10	8	1	1	16	8	+8	17
2	Rovers	10	2	4	4	16	15	+1	8
3	Metropolitans	10	1	6	3	10	19	−9	5

Source: WAFL Footy Facts
Rules for classification: 1) points; 2) percentage; 3) number of points for.
(P) Premiers
