= 1886 WAFA season =

- Premiers: Fremantle; 1st premiership

The 1886 WAFA season was the 2nd season of senior Australian rules football in Perth, Western Australia. The Fremantle Football Club won its first premiership and then became defunct at the end of the season, with most of its players transferring to Unions, also based in Fremantle.

== Ladder ==
1886 ladder
Pos	Team	Pld	W	L	D	GF	GA	GD	Pts
1	Fremantle (P)	9	7	0	2	33	10	+23	16
2	Victorians	9	4	2	3	15	10	+5	11
3	Rovers	9	2	6	1	8	19	−11	5
4	Unions	9	2	7	0	11	28	−17	4

Source: WAFL Footy Facts
Rules for classification: 1) points; 2) percentage; 3) number of points for.
(P) Premiers
