= 1885 WAFA season =

Western Australian Australian rules football season

- Premiers: Rovers; 1st premiership

The 1885 WAFA season was the first season of senior Australian rules football in Perth, Western Australia.

The first WAFL game was played at the Esplanade Reserve between Rovers and Victorians on Saturday 6 June 1885. Rovers won the game by a goal. The final score was Rovers 1.6 defeated Victorians 0.6.

== Ladder ==
1885 ladder
Pos	Team	Pld	W	L	D	GF	GA	GD	Pts
1	Rovers (P)	7	4	1	2	8	2	+6	10
2	Victorians	8	3	4	1	9	9	0	7
3	Fremantle	6	1	2	3	5	7	−2	5
4	High School	1	0	1	0	0	4	−4	0

Source: WAFL Footy Facts
Rules for classification: 1) points; 2) percentage; 3) number of points for.
(P) Premiers
