= 1888 WAFA season =

West Australian football season

- Premiers: Unions; 2nd premiership

The 1888 WAFA season was the 4th season of senior Australian rules football in Perth, Western Australia. The Unions Football Club won its second consecutive premiership of what would be a four-peat.

== Ladder ==
1888 ladder
Pos	Team	Pld	W	L	D	GF	GA	GD	Pts
1	Unions (P)	9	6	1	2	23	6	+17	14
2	Rovers	9	4	2	3	20	20	0	11
3	Victorians	9	3	4	2	13	16	−3	8
4	West Australian	9	1	7	1	9	23	−14	3

Source: WAFL Footy Facts
Rules for classification: 1) points; 2) percentage; 3) number of points for.
(P) Premiers
