= 1892 WAFA season =

- Premiers: Fremantle; 5th premiership

The 1892 WAFA season was the 8th season of senior Australian rules football in Perth, Western Australia. Fremantle won their fifth premiership and first out of a five-peat. This seasons also marks the first season since 1888 where there were 4 competing teams, due to the Centrals Football Club dissolving after one season.

== Ladder ==
1892 ladder
Pos	Team	Pld	W	L	D	GF	GA	GD	Pts
1	Fremantle (P)	15	11	4	0	65	24	+41	22
2	West Perth	15	10	4	1	42	21	+21	21
3	Rovers	12	5	6	1	34	29	+5	11
4	East Perth	12	0	12	0	6	73	−67	0

Source: WAFL Footy Facts
Rules for classification: 1) points; 2) percentage; 3) number of points for.
(P) Premiers
