= West Australian =

West Australian refers to people or things from the Australian state of Western Australia.

West Australian may also refer to:

- The West Australian, an Australian daily newspaper
- West Australian (horse), a British Thoroughbred racehorse
- West Australian Airways, a defunct Australian airline
- West Australian Football Club, a defunct Australian rules football club
