= 1898 WAFA season =

Western Australian football season

- Teams: 4
- Premiers: Fremantle; 10th premiership
- Minor premiers: Fremantle; 10th minor premiership

The 1898 WAFA season was the 14th season of senior Australian rules football in Perth, Western Australia.

== Ladder ==
Pos	Team	Pld	W	L	D	PF	PA	PP	Pts
1	Fremantle (P)	16	12	3	1	668	506	132.0	50
2	West Perth	16	12	4	0	808	501	161.3	48
3	Rovers	15	5	9	1	532	638	83.4	22
4	East Fremantle	15	1	14	0	394	757	52.0	4

Source: WAFL Footy Facts
Rules for classification: 1) points; 2) percentage; 3) number of points for.
(P) Premiers
