= 1899 WAFA season =

Western Australian football season

- Teams: 5
- Premiers: West Perth; 2nd premiership
- Minor premiers: West Perth; 2nd minor premiership

The 1899 WAFA season was the 15th season of senior Australian rules football in Perth, Western Australia.

== Ladder ==
Pos	Team	Pld	W	L	D	PF	PA	PP	Pts
1	West Perth (P)	16	14	2	0	836	450	185.8	56
2	East Fremantle	17	12	5	0	882	519	169.9	48
3	Fremantle	18	7	11	0	602	749	80.4	28
4	Perth	9	1	8	0	246	580	42.4	4
5	Rovers (F)	8	0	8	0	163	431	37.8	0

Source: WAFL Footy Facts
Rules for classification: 1) points; 2) percentage; 3) number of points for.
(F) Club folded mid-season, Perth fulfilled remaining fixtures; (P) Premiers
