= 1906 WAFA season =

- Teams: 8
- Premiers: East Fremantle; 5th premiership
- Minor premiers: South Fremantle; 1st minor premiership

The 1906 WAFA season was the 22nd season of senior Australian rules football in Perth, Western Australia.

== Ladder ==
1906 ladder
Pos	Team	Pld	W	L	D	PF	PA	PP	Pts
1	South Fremantle	17	15	2	0	1110	573	193.7	60
2	East Fremantle (P)	17	13	2	2	1038	661	157.0	56
3	West Perth	17	11	6	0	775	633	122.4	44
4	Perth	17	10	6	1	885	753	117.5	42
5	Midland Junction	17	6	11	0	788	891	88.4	24
6	North Fremantle	17	5	11	1	624	817	76.4	22
7	East Perth	17	5	12	0	532	767	69.4	20
8	Subiaco	17	1	16	0	445	1102	40.4	4

Source: WAFL Footy Facts
Rules for classification: 1) points; 2) percentage; 3) number of points for.
(P) Premiers

== Grand Final ==
1906 WAFA Grand Final
Saturday, 6 October	West Perth	def. by	East Fremantle	W.A.C.A
2.1 (13); 4.3 (27); 4.5 (29); 5.6 (36)	Q1; Q2; Q3; Final	3.0 (18); 5.0 (30); 9.3 (57); 12.3 (75)
