= Metropolitan Football Club =

Former Australian rules football team in Perth, Western Australia

Metropolitan

Names
- Full name: Metropolitan Football Club

Club details
- Founded: 1889 (merger between Victorians and West Australians)
- Dissolved: 1891
- Colours: red and black
- Competition: WAFA (1889–90)
- Captain(s): F. McDonough
- Premierships: nil

The Metropolitan Football Club was a West Australian Football League club based in Perth, Western Australia. The club was formed in 1888 after merging the Victorians and West Australian Football Club at the end of the 1888 season.

In April 1889, a meeting of the West Australian and Victorian Football Clubs was held at the Criterion Hotel, in which it was unanimously decided to amalgamate the two clubs into a single club known as the Metropolitan Football Club. The West Australians' captain, F. McDonough, remained captain of the combined club, while West Australians' club colours of red and black were maintained for the merged club.

In 1891, a meeting of footballers was held to form a new team, to be called West Perth, which embraced the members of the now-defunct Metropolitan Football Club.
