= 1944 WANFL season =

Australian rules football season

- Teams: 8
- Premiers: East Perth; 9th premiership
- Minor premiers: East Perth; 8th minor premiership
- Sandover Medallist: Jim Davies (Swan Districts)
- Leading goalkicker: Alan Watts (East Perth)

The 1944 WANFL season was the 60th season of the various incarnations of the Western Australian National Football League. Consequent upon the improved fortunes of the Allies in the Pacific War, the league's decision to restrict football to those under nineteen as of 1 October become somewhat controversial, but the WANFL after much debate during the early weeks of the season decided it would not raise the age limit or even as West Perth suggested allow four 1943 players over the limit to play. This meant that a large number of players who had been mainstays in the 1942 and 1943 seasons were no longer eligible to play, and as in 1943 a number of players still eligible were erratically available due to service in the war.

The 1944 season is notable for the first perfect season in the history of Western Australian league football, by East Perth. Under the coaching of former forward Cecil Rowland an exceptionally powerful core of players was developed from 1942 and 1943 mainstays including Frank Allen, Ken Wimbridge, Ray Perry, John "Todge" Campbell and Ron Brentnall, joined by outstanding talents in full-forward Alan Watts, key position player Jim Washbourne and injury-plagued but talented rover Norm Gibbney. So well-equipped were the Royals that they did not suffer during the finals from the loss of best-and-fairest Campbell, ruckman Brentnall and Ron Frankish – instead fitting Northam defender Jack Leadbitter and Wesley rover Ernie England for their only games of the season and losing nothing in efficiency. At the other end of the ladder, South Fremantle, already last in 1943, lost their only class players in Frank Treasure and Erik Eriksson and became the first team since Midland Junction in 1917 to lose every match. The red and whites in fact never led during the second half in any of their nineteen matches, and officials were so desperate that a meeting of former players was called mid-season to revive the club's on-field fortunes – to no effect.

Apart from South Fremantle's winless season, Claremont suffered a huge loss when Claremont Oval, which had been their home ground since 1927, had its grandstand completely burnt down in a fire at 5:11 a.m. on 28 July. In the fire, which was estimated to have cost a total of £3000, all the records, jerseys and training equipment were lost, and Claremont were forced to play home matches at Subiaco Oval and the W.A.C.A. until 1948, (Note: The Claremont Showground, which would ordinarily have been available as an alternative Tiger home venue, was commandeered by the military between 1940 and 1944, and itself burned in a fire in January 1945.) despite financial donations by Collingwood to help rebuild the grandstand. The Tigers had to take the field in several games wearing East Perth guernseys, and suffered from the loss of key players like Robin Farmer, consequently falling to second-last on the ladder.

== Home-and-away season ==
=== Round 1 ===
	Round 1
Saturday, 13 May (2:45 pm)	Subiaco 6.17 (53)	def. by	Perth 8.18 (66)	Subiaco Oval
Saturday, 13 May (2:45 pm)	East Perth 41.30 (276)	def.	South Fremantle 3.2 (20)	Perth Oval
Saturday, 13 May (2:45 pm)	East Fremantle 16.19 (115)	def.	Claremont 5.4 (34)	Fremantle Oval
Saturday, 13 May (2:45 pm)	West Perth 9.16 (70)	def.	Swan Districts 10.6 (66)	Leederville Oval
East Perth’s mammoth win sets numerous records: 1. The biggest winning margin in WA(N)FL history, beating North Fremantle’s 164-point win over Subiaco from 1902.; 2. The highest score in WANFL history, beating Claremont’s 33.22 (220) against Swan Districts in 1940.; 3. The most points in the first quarter of a WANFL match – a record beaten later in the season.; 4. South Fremantle become the first WA(N)FL team to lose three consecutive games by over 100 points – an ignominy they would suffer twice further this season but which no other club would equal until 1958.; 5. Alan Watts kicked sixteen goals for East Perth, which remains a record for the Royals in any match, and forward pocket Harry Outridge and "Todge" Campbell kicked eight apiece.

=== Round 2 ===
	Round 2
Saturday, 20 May (2:45 pm)	East Perth 9.14 (68)	def.	West Perth 9.9 (63)	Perth Oval
Saturday, 20 May (2:45 pm)	Perth 12.5 (77)	def. by	East Fremantle 14.10 (94)	WACA
Saturday, 20 May (2:45 pm)	Swan Districts 22.11 (143)	def.	South Fremantle 9.3 (57)	Subiaco Oval
Saturday, 20 May (2:45 pm)	Claremont 9.4 (58)	def. by	Subiaco 13.19 (97)	Claremont Oval
Following upon their record score, East Perth are nearly brought to earth by West Perth, with only a late goal from Outridge ensuring a victory that would prove their closest shave for the season.

=== Round 3 ===
	Round 3
Saturday, 27 May (2:45 pm)	Perth 9.12 (66)	def. by	Claremont 9.15 (69)	WACA
Saturday, 27 May (2:45 pm)	South Fremantle 8.10 (58)	def. by	West Perth 17.12 (114)	Fremantle Oval
Saturday, 27 May (2:45 pm)	Swan Districts 10.9 (69)	def. by	East Perth 16.5 (101)	Bassendean Oval
Saturday, 27 May (2:45 pm)	Subiaco 14.15 (99)	def.	East Fremantle 10.8 (68)	Subiaco Oval
Alan Watts kicks eleven goals straight to comfortably win a match where Swans matched their powerful rivals in general play.

=== Round 4 ===
	Round 4
Saturday, 3 June (2:45 pm)	West Perth 11.11 (77)	def.	Subiaco 9.10 (64)	Leederville Oval
Saturday, 3 June (2:45 pm)	Swan Districts 8.12 (60)	def.	Perth 7.11 (53)	Bassendean Oval
Saturday, 3 June (2:45 pm)	Claremont 8.8 (56)	def. by	East Perth 14.25 (109)	Subiaco Oval
Saturday, 3 June (2:45 pm)	East Fremantle 11.12 (78)	def.	South Fremantle 9.5 (59)	Fremantle Oval
A burst of five goals in ten minutes places South Fremantle within four points of their local rivals, but they fail to go on and this proves their solitary chance of a win for the season.

=== Round 5 ===
	Round 5
Saturday, 10 June (2:45 pm)	Subiaco 27.22 (184)	def.	South Fremantle 5.7 (37)	Subiaco Oval
Saturday, 10 June (2:45 pm)	Claremont 13.18 (96)	def.	Swan Districts 10.12 (72)	Claremont Oval
Saturday, 10 June (2:45 pm)	East Perth 16.21 (117)	def.	Perth 9.8 (62)	Perth Oval
Saturday, 10 June (2:45 pm)	East Fremantle 8.22 (70)	def.	West Perth 7.10 (52)	Fremantle Oval
Despite the absence of key rovers David Muir and Frank Evans, Perth kick 7.4 (46) against the powerful Royal defence, but with Campbell kicking eight goals are gradually overwhelmed.; Subiaco’s score, as South Fremantle return to their exceptionally weak opening-round form, was their highest in the WA(N)FL until 1984. Ernie Tonkinson kicked eleven goals and Hughes eight.

=== Round 6 ===
	Round 6
Saturday, 17 June (2:45 pm)	Swan Districts 10.7 (67)	def. by	East Fremantle 12.11 (83)	Perth Oval
Saturday, 17 June (2:45 pm)	Subiaco 11.10 (76)	def. by	East Perth 11.20 (86)	Subiaco Oval
Saturday, 17 June (2:45 pm)	West Perth 18.15 (123)	def.	Claremont 3.5 (23)	Leederville Oval
Saturday, 17 June (2:45 pm)	South Fremantle 5.8 (38)	def. by	Perth 14.26 (110)	Fremantle Oval
East Perth again recover from being jumped by the opponent to win, despite a brilliant eight-goal effort from Ernie Tonkinson.

=== Round 7 ===
	Round 7
Saturday, 24 June (2:45 pm)	East Fremantle 11.8 (74)	def. by	East Perth 12.17 (89)	Subiaco Oval
Saturday, 24 June (2:45 pm)	Perth 6.15 (51)	def. by	West Perth 13.20 (98)	WACA
Saturday, 24 June (2:45 pm)	Swan Districts 12.8 (80)	def. by	Subiaco 12.22 (94)	Bassendean Oval
Saturday, 24 June (2:45 pm)	Claremont 21.21 (147)	def.	South Fremantle 10.8 (68)	Claremont Oval

=== Round 8 ===
	Round 8
Saturday, 1 July (2:45 pm)	Swan Districts 9.14 (68)	def.	West Perth 8.10 (58)	Bassendean Oval
Saturday, 1 July (2:45 pm)	Claremont 8.16 (64)	def.	East Fremantle 8.9 (57)	Claremont Oval
Saturday, 1 July (2:45 pm)	Perth 6.11 (47)	def.	Subiaco 5.3 (33)	WACA
Saturday, 1 July (2:45 pm)	South Fremantle 2.3 (15)	def. by	East Perth 17.16 (118)	Fremantle Oval
In shocking conditions due to heavy rain and strong winds, South Fremantle, devoid of talent in attack all season, for the first of three times kick the lowest WA(N)FL score since Subiaco’s 1.2 (8) against the Royals in 1920.

=== Round 9 ===
	Round 9
Saturday, 8 July (2:45 pm)	Swan Districts 17.20 (122)	def.	South Fremantle 2.1 (13)	Perth Oval
Saturday, 8 July (2:45 pm)	West Perth 8.10 (58)	def. by	East Perth 15.14 (104)	Leederville Oval
Saturday, 8 July (2:45 pm)	Subiaco 13.19 (97)	def.	Claremont 7.11 (53)	Subiaco Oval
Saturday, 8 July (2:45 pm)	East Fremantle 12.14 (86)	def.	Perth 10.11 (71)	Fremantle Oval
For the second consecutive week South Fremantle kick the lowest WA(N)FL score since 1920, and as the lowest score against Swan Districts it was unequalled until Claremont kicked 1.7 (13) in 1996.

=== Round 10 ===
	Round 10
Saturday, 15 July (2:45 pm)	West Perth 22.25 (157)	def.	South Fremantle 6.7 (43)	Leederville Oval
Saturday, 15 July (2:45 pm)	East Fremantle 9.12 (66)	def.	Subiaco 8.17 (65)	Fremantle Oval
Saturday, 15 July (2:45 pm)	East Perth 8.13 (61)	def.	Swan Districts 7.11 (53)	Perth Oval
Saturday, 15 July (2:45 pm)	Perth 10.12 (72)	def.	Claremont 7.12 (54)	Subiaco Oval
Swan Districts draw within one point of the unbeaten Royals with a rugged burst led by centreman Davies, before a goal with half a minute remaining keeps the Royals unbeaten.; South Fremantle, for the second occasion, suffer three consecutive 100-point or more losses, as early resistance by their defence evaporated after quarter-time.

=== Round 11 ===
	Round 11
Saturday, 22 July (2:45 pm)	Claremont 7.11 (53)	def. by	East Perth 13.15 (93)	Claremont Oval
Saturday, 22 July (2:45 pm)	Perth 10.12 (72)	def.	Swan Districts 6.11 (47)	WACA
Saturday, 22 July (2:45 pm)	Subiaco 9.11 (65)	def. by	West Perth 10.7 (67)	Subiaco Oval
Saturday, 22 July (2:45 pm)	East Fremantle 7.17 (59)	def.	South Fremantle 6.8 (44)	Fremantle Oval
East Perth’s eleventh consecutive win would prove the last match at Claremont Oval until the opening round of 1948, owing to the Claremont Oval fire the following Friday.

=== Round 12 ===
	Round 12
Saturday, 29 July (2:45 pm)	South Fremantle 4.4 (28)	def. by	Subiaco 15.20 (110)	Fremantle Oval
Saturday, 29 July (2:45 pm)	East Fremantle 16.18 (114)	def.	West Perth 5.4 (34)	Subiaco Oval
Saturday, 29 July (2:45 pm)	Swan Districts 12.11 (83)	def.	Claremont 10.10 (70)	Bassendean Oval
Saturday, 29 July (2:45 pm)	Perth 8.12 (60)	def. by	East Perth 15.18 (108)	WACA

=== Round 13 ===
	Round 13
Saturday, 5 August (2:45 pm)	East Perth 11.12 (78)	def.	Subiaco 7.7 (49)	Perth Oval
Saturday, 5 August (2:45 pm)	East Fremantle 13.15 (93)	def.	Swan Districts 7.15 (57)	Subiaco Oval
Saturday, 5 August (2:45 pm)	West Perth 12.14 (86)	def.	Claremont 9.14 (68)	Leederville Oval
Saturday, 5 August (2:45 pm)	Perth 17.21 (123)	def.	South Fremantle 2.3 (15)	WACA
A fine comeback in the last quarter after Subiaco take the lead during the third gives East Perth the longest winning sequence to this point in WA(N)FL history.

=== Round 14 ===
	Round 14
Saturday, 12 August (2:45 pm)	East Perth 11.16 (82)	def.	East Fremantle 7.11 (53)	Perth Oval
Saturday, 12 August (2:45 pm)	Subiaco 8.11 (59)	def. by	Swan Districts 9.15 (69)	Subiaco Oval
Saturday, 12 August (2:45 pm)	West Perth 12.9 (81)	def.	Perth 9.9 (63)	Leederville Oval
Saturday, 12 August (2:45 pm)	South Fremantle 4.3 (27)	def. by	Claremont 18.27 (135)	Fremantle Oval

=== Round 15 ===
	Round 15
Saturday, 19 August (2:45 pm)	East Fremantle 12.14 (86)	def.	Claremont 7.14 (56)	Fremantle Oval
Saturday, 19 August (2:45 pm)	Perth 10.12 (72)	def.	Subiaco 8.13 (61)	WACA
Saturday, 19 August (2:45 pm)	West Perth 11.15 (81)	def.	Swan Districts 12.8 (80)	Leederville Oval
Saturday, 19 August (2:45 pm)	East Perth 17.21 (123)	def.	South Fremantle 1.5 (11)	Subiaco Oval
For the third time in eight matches, South Fremantle kick the lowest score since 1920. In the process, the red and whites become the first WA(N)FL team since East Perth themselves against West Perth in 1913 to fail to score in the first half, and for the third time in 1944 lose three successive matches by over a hundred points.

=== Round 16 ===
	Round 16
Saturday, 26 August (2:45 pm)	Swan Districts 9.7 (61)	def. by	East Perth 15.14 (104)	Bassendean Oval
Saturday, 26 August (2:45 pm)	South Fremantle 9.6 (60)	def. by	West Perth 18.18 (126)	Fremantle Oval
Saturday, 26 August (2:45 pm)	Subiaco 11.10 (76)	def. by	East Fremantle 12.8 (80)	Subiaco Oval
Saturday, 26 August (2:45 pm)	Perth 16.12 (108)	def.	Claremont 10.13 (73)	WACA

=== Round 17 ===
	Round 17
Saturday, 2 September (2:45 pm)	Subiaco 7.8 (50)	def. by	West Perth 9.9 (63)	Subiaco Oval
Saturday, 2 September (2:45 pm)	Swan Districts 11.6 (72)	def. by	Perth 11.15 (81)	Bassendean Oval
Saturday, 2 September (2:45 pm)	East Perth 17.21 (123)	def.	Claremont 3.5 (23)	Perth Oval
Saturday, 2 September (2:45 pm)	East Fremantle 33.23 (221)	def.	South Fremantle 2.8 (20)	Fremantle Oval
Perth’s win against Swan Districts ensures their first finals appearance since 1934.

=== Round 18 ===
	Round 18
Saturday, 9 September (2:45 pm)	West Perth 9.14 (68)	def. by	East Fremantle 9.17 (71)	Leederville Oval
Saturday, 9 September (2:45 pm)	South Fremantle 7.7 (49)	def. by	Subiaco 13.23 (101)	Fremantle Oval
Saturday, 9 September (2:45 pm)	Claremont 8.10 (58)	def. by	Swan Districts 17.7 (109)	Subiaco Oval
Saturday, 9 September (2:45 pm)	East Perth 14.18 (102)	def.	Perth 4.3 (27)	Perth Oval
Despite starting the final quarter four points ahead and scoring only 0.7 (7), East Fremantle hold off West Perth and secure the double chance in the finals.

=== Round 19 ===
	Round 19
Saturday, 16 September (2:45 pm)	Claremont 10.26 (86)	def.	South Fremantle 7.5 (47)	Subiaco Oval
Saturday, 16 September (2:45 pm)	Perth 13.12 (90)	def.	West Perth 8.13 (61)	WACA
Saturday, 16 September (2:45 pm)	East Fremantle 10.5 (65)	def. by	East Perth 16.23 (119)	Fremantle Oval
Saturday, 16 September (2:45 pm)	Swan Districts 7.9 (51)	def. by	Subiaco 11.4 (70)	Bassendean Oval
Despite the absence of four key players, East Perth restrict Old Easts to 1.1 (7) after half-time to go through the home-and-away season undefeated, and Alan Watts with eight majors beats “Bonny” Campbell’s 1926 record of eighty-nine goals.

== Ladder ==
1944 WANFL ladder
Pos	Team	Pld	W	L	D	PF	PA	PP	Pts
1	East Perth (P)	19	19	0	0	2061	948	217.4	76
2	East Fremantle	19	14	5	0	1633	1233	132.4	56
3	West Perth	19	12	7	0	1537	1276	120.5	48
4	Perth	19	10	9	0	1371	1322	103.7	40
5	Subiaco	19	8	11	0	1503	1195	125.8	32
6	Swan Districts	19	7	12	0	1429	1374	104.0	28
7	Claremont	19	6	13	0	1276	1638	77.9	24
8	South Fremantle	19	0	19	0	709	2533	28.0	0

Rules for classification: 1) points; 2) percentage; 3) number of points for.
(P) Premiers

== Finals ==
=== First semi-final ===
	First semi-final
Saturday, 23 September (2:45 pm)	West Perth 7.21 (63)	drew with	Perth 9.9 (63)	Subiaco Oval (crowd: 7,000)
West Perth’s early inaccuracy keeps the Redlegs in a match that culminates in a thrilling struggle where the lead changes several times in the last few minutes before finishing in a tie.

=== First semi-final replay ===
	First semi-final replay
Saturday, 30 September (2:45 pm)	West Perth 5.7 (37)	def. by	Perth 8.13 (61)	Subiaco Oval (crowd: 8,000)
A brilliant last quarter into the wind, whereby the Cardinals are held scoreless, gives Perth a comfortable win in a third successive battle with West Perth.

=== Second semi-final ===
	Second semi-final
Saturday, 7 October (2:45 pm)	East Perth 14.8 (92)	def.	East Fremantle 9.20 (74)	Subiaco Oval
With a more efficient forward line, and a defence bolstered by Northam recruit Jack Leadbitter, East Perth win their twentieth consecutive match for the season.

=== Preliminary final ===
	Preliminary final
Saturday, 14 October (2:45 pm)	East Fremantle 10.15 (75)	def.	Perth 7.8 (50)	Subiaco Oval
Prime Minister John Curtin, a devoted football fan, is part of what is viewed as the largest crowd of the season.

=== Grand Final ===
1944 WANFL Grand Final
21 October (2:45pm)	East Perth	def.	East Fremantle	Subiaco Oval (crowd: 8,991)
5.3 (33); 6.4 (40); 11.9 (75); 14.13 (97)	Q1; Q2; Q3; Final	1.3 (9); 2.13 (25); 2.16 (28); 4.17 (41)	Umpires: Leo McComish
Sparrow 4, Outridge 4, Watts 3, England, Washbourne, Gibbney	Goals	Cumbers 2, Hinkley, McIntosh
Perry (best on ground), Watts, Washbourne, Grose, Wimbridge, Outridge, England, Candler, Gibbney	Best	Hird, Cormack, Crannage, Garrity, Bowen, Billett, Hinkley
East Perth complete a flawless season with a convincing win driven by overwhelming ruck superiority and polished flawed play that contrasts with East Fremantle's 2.13 (25) – including ten consecutive behinds – in the first half.
