= 1916 WAFL season =

Australian rules football season

- Teams: 7
- Premiers: South Fremantle; 1st premiership
- Minor premiers: East Fremantle; 11th minor premiership
- Matches played: 46

The 1916 season was the 32nd season of the West Australian Football League (WAFL).

== Ladder ==
1916 ladder
| Pos | Team | Pld | W | L | D | PF | PA | PP | Pts |
|---|---|---|---|---|---|---|---|---|---|
| 1 | East Fremantle | 12 | 10 | 2 | 0 | 1017 | 475 | 214.1 | 40 |
| 2 | Perth | 12 | 10 | 2 | 0 | 793 | 392 | 202.3 | 40 |
| 3 | South Fremantle (P) | 12 | 7 | 5 | 0 | 723 | 660 | 109.5 | 28 |
| 4 | West Perth | 12 | 6 | 6 | 0 | 518 | 680 | 76.2 | 24 |
| 5 | East Perth | 12 | 4 | 8 | 0 | 634 | 804 | 78.9 | 16 |
| 6 | Midland Junction | 12 | 3 | 9 | 0 | 586 | 987 | 59.4 | 12 |
| 7 | Subiaco | 12 | 2 | 10 | 0 | 529 | 802 | 66.0 | 8 |

Source: WAFL Footy Facts
Rules for classification: 1) points; 2) percentage; 3) number of points for.
(P) Premiers

== Grand Final ==
1916 WAFL Grand Final
Saturday, 9 September (12:00 pm) | East Fremantle | def. by | South Fremantle | W.A.C.A
0.1 (1); 3.5 (23); 3.5 (23); 5.5 (35) | Q1; Q2; Q3; Final | 3.3 (21); 3.3 (21); 6.8 (44); 7.12 (54) | Umpires: Craig
