= Horace Wilson (cricketer) =

Australian cricketer

Personal information
- Born: 28 June 1864; Kadina, South Australia
- Died: 15 May 1923 (aged 58); West Perth, Western Australia
- Batting: Left-handed
- Role: Wicket-keeper

Domestic team information
- Years: Team
- 1892/93: Western Australia

Career statistics
Competition	FC
Matches	1
Runs scored	13
Batting average	13.00
100s/50s	0/0
Top score	10*
Catches/stumpings	2/2
- Source: Cricinfo, 28 July 2013

Horace Wilson (28 June 1864 – 15 May 1923) was an Australian cricketer. He played for Western Australia in 1892 and 1893.
