= Victorian Football Club (Western Australia) =

Former Australian rules football team in Perth, Western Australia

Victorians

Names
- Full name: Victorian Football Club
- Nickname(s): Victorians, Vics, Reds

Club details
- Founded: 1885
- Dissolved: 1888 (merged with West Australians)
- Colours: navy blue and cardinal
- Competition: WAFA (1885–88)
- Captain(s): ↓ see below
- Premierships: nil
- Ground(s): Old Recreation Ground; New Recreation Ground

The Victorian Football Club, often referred to as Victorians or Vics, was an Australian rules football club based in Perth, Western Australia. Formed in 1885, the club was a founding member of the West Australian Football Association (WAFA), which was established the same year. The club merged with the West Australian Football Club at the end of the 1888 season to form the Metropolitan Football Club.

== History ==
The club was established on 2 May 1885, when a meeting was held at the Criterion Hotel in Perth in order to form a "new Footballers' Club". At the meeting, A. C. Rankin and H. S. Haussen were elected captain and vice-captain of the club, respectively, while J. C. H. James was elected president. A number of names were suggested for the new club, with "various appellations such as Cornstalks, Wanderers, Federals, and Victorians" being suggested. It was eventually decided that the club would be known as the Victorian Football Club, and would play in navy blue and cardinal guernseys.

The following week, on 8 May, representatives of Victorians and two other clubs, Rovers and Fremantle, met at the Criterion Hotel, establishing the West Australian Football Association. Victorians' secretary, Hugh Dixson, was made secretary of the new association. Later, the High School (now Hale School) was invited to field a team in the competition, but dropped out of the league after two matches due to a lack of competitiveness. Victorians' first match, which was also the first match of the competition, was against Rovers on 3 June, and was played at the Recreation Ground (later the Esplanade Reserve) near the Swan River. Victorians' team consisted of 19 players, with four emergencies. Rules for the match were variable – the game began with a kick-off instead of a ball-up, and one player, Drummond of the Rovers, carried the ball behind the line in an attempt to score a Rugby-style "touchdown". The match ended with Rovers (one goal, six behinds and a touchdown) defeating Victorians (six behinds). The club played a further five games for the season, finishing with a total of two wins, one draw, and three losses, allowing them to finish in second place behind Rovers on the ladder.

At the general meeting of the club in April 1886, Dixson was replaced by H. Wilson as secretary, and J. C. H. James moved to the position of chairman, allowing Edward V. H. Keane to assume the position of president of the club. It was also noted that there were: "names of a hundred members on the books". Victorians finished runner-up in the competition in both 1886 and 1887, dropping to third place in 1888.

In April 1889, a meeting of the West Australian and Victorian Football Clubs was held at the Criterion Hotel, in which it was unanimously decided to amalgamate the two clubs into a single club known as the Metropolitan Football Club, which contested the 1889 and 1890 seasons. The West Australians' captain, F. McDonough, remained captain of the combined club, while West Australians' club colours of red and black were maintained for the merged club.

== Honourboard ==
| Year | Position | Captain | Vice-captain | Patron | President | Secretary | Ref |
|---|---|---|---|---|---|---|---|
| 1885 | 2nd | Alexander Rankin | H. S. Haussen | Frederick Broome | J. C. H. James | Hugh Dixson | |
| 1886 | 2nd | Alexander Rankin | H. Gamson | Edward Scott | Edward V. H. Keane | Horace Wilson | |
| 1887 | 2nd | Horace Wilson | Harry Sadler | Edward V. H. Keane | Hector Rason | A. Lake | |
| 1888 | 3rd | Harry Sadler | W. Sheehan | Hector Rason | Edward Scott | A. A. Moffat | |
