= 1901 WAFA season =

- Teams: 6
- Premiers: West Perth; 3rd premiership
- Minor premiers: West Perth; 3rd minor premiership

The 1901 WAFA season was the 17th season of senior Australian rules football in Perth, Western Australia.

== Ladder ==
1901 ladder
Pos	Team	Pld	W	L	D	PF	PA	PP	Pts
1	West Perth (P)	15	12	3	0	940	479	196.2	48
2	East Fremantle	15	10	5	0	693	530	130.8	40
3	South Fremantle	15	7	8	0	629	644	97.7	28
4	Perth	14	6	8	0	465	514	90.5	24
5	North Fremantle	14	5	9	0	487	671	72.6	20
6	Subiaco	15	4	11	0	400	776	51.5	16

Source: WAFL Footy Facts
Rules for classification: 1) points; 2) percentage; 3) number of points for.
(P) Premiers
