= 1915 WAFL season =

31st season of the West Australian Football League

- Teams: 8
- Premiers: Subiaco; 3rd premiership
- Minor premiers: South Fremantle; 2nd minor premiership
- Matches played: 87

The 1915 WAFL season was the 31st season of the West Australian Football League.

== Ladder ==
1915 ladder
Pos	Team	Pld	W	L	D	PF	PA	PP	Pts
1	South Fremantle	21	14	6	1	1082	785	137.8	58
2	Subiaco (P)	21	14	7	0	1244	930	133.8	56
3	Perth	21	13	8	0	1255	928	135.2	52
4	East Perth	21	13	8	0	1095	921	118.9	52
5	Midland Junction	21	13	8	0	1148	992	115.7	52
6	East Fremantle	21	11	9	1	1025	940	109.0	46
7	West Perth	21	4	17	0	829	1455	57.0	16
8	North Fremantle	21	1	20	0	569	1296	43.9	4

Source: WAFL Footy Facts
Rules for classification: 1) points; 2) percentage; 3) number of points for.
(P) Premiers

== Grand Final ==
1915 WAFL Grand Final
Saturday, 25 September (12:00 pm)	Subiaco	def.	Perth	Perth Oval
1.1 (7); 1.2 (8); 1.3 (9); 3.3 (21)	Q1; Q2; Q3; Final	1.0 (6); 1.4 (10); 2.4 (16); 2.7 (19)	Umpires: Billy Orr
