= West Australian Football Club =

Defunct Australian rules football club

West Australians

Names
- Full name: West Australian Football Club
- Nickname(s): West Australians; Wests

Club details
- Founded: 1886
- Dissolved: 1889 (merged with Victorians)
- Colours: red and black
- Competition: 1886–1886: Unaffiliated; 1887–1888: WAFA
- Captain(s): 1886–1886: G. Moffatt; 1887–1888: F. McDonough
- Premierships: Nil
- Ground(s): Old Recreation Ground; New Recreation Ground

The West Australian Football Club, often referred to at the time as West Australians or Wests, was an Australian rules football club based in Perth, Western Australia. Formed in 1886, the club was originally not associated with any competition, but entered the senior West Australian Football Association (WAFA) the following season. The club finished last in both its seasons in the competition, merging with the Victorian Football Club on 16 April 1889 to form the Metropolitan Football Club.

== History ==
The club was established as early as mid-1886, when The Daily News was requested by J. Mansfield, the club's secretary, to "draw the attention of members of the West Australian Football Club to a Special Meeting" at the Criterion Hotel on 19 July 1886. Two matches were recorded against the Mercantiles team, comprising players from the "Perth stores", in August and September 1886. The first match was won by West Australians, and the second by Mercantiles, with both being played at the Old Recreation Ground (now Wellington Square). G. Moffatt was West Australians' captain in both matches.

At the May 1887 annual meeting of the West Australian Football Association (WAFA), which itself had been established in May 1885, a letter was read from the West Australian Football Club requesting admission into the league, which was granted. Messrs Mansfield, Ramsay, and McDonough were made delegates of the club to the association. At the same meeting, it was resolved that West Australians would be allowed to play with 23 men on the field (instead of the usual 20), as the majority of the club's players were juniors. The club's guernsey was also designated as red and black hoops. Through the 1887 season, the team struggled to win matches, and in one match lost to the Perth Football Club, a junior team at the time. F. McDonough captained the team in most matches, with R. Ramsay usually serving as vice-captain. The club again struggled to compete in 1888 – in one match, against Unions, the team conceded eight goals, while failing to score a single goal for themselves. On 16 April 1889, a meeting of the West Australian and Victorian Football Clubs was held at the Criterion Hotel, in which it was unanimously decided to amalgamate the two clubs into a single club known as the Metropolitan Football Club. F. McDonough remained captain of the combined club, while West Australians' club colours of red and black were maintained for the merged club. Overall, in two years in the competition, West Australians played in 17 matches, winning three, drawing one, and losing thirteen, for an overall winning percentage of 20.6%.
