= Wellington Square, Perth =

Park in East Perth, Western Australia

Coordinates: 31.9545°S 115.8719°E

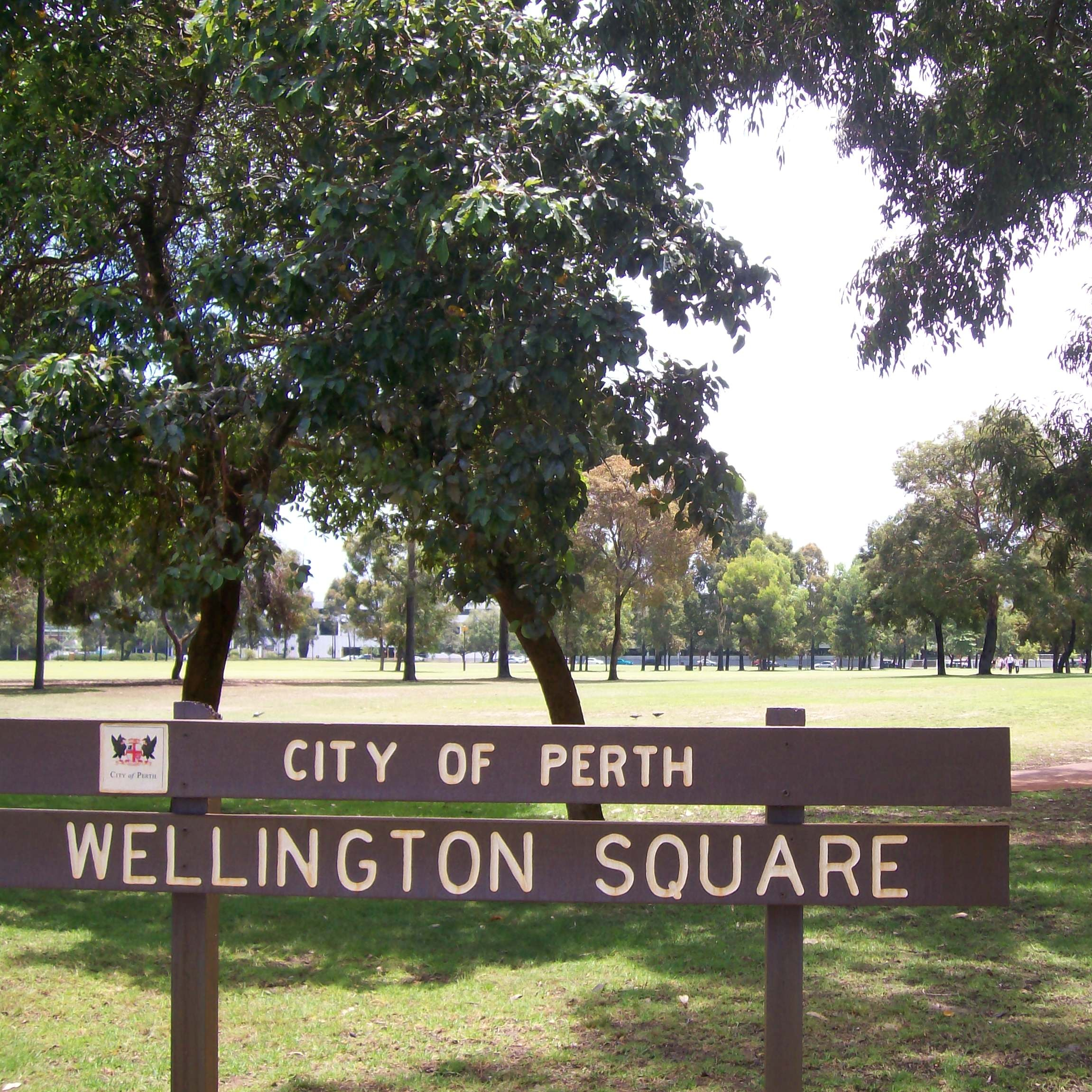
Wellington Square in 2010

Moort-ak Waadiny / Wellington Square is a public park located on Wellington Street in the suburb of East Perth in Perth, Western Australia.

== History ==
The park was originally a swamp and was drained in the 1830s. It was originally used to exercise horses. The ground was known as the Recreation Ground or the Rec.

In 1898 the ground was cleared to form a series of cricket fields, and named in honour of the Duke of Wellington, Prime Minister of the United Kingdom at the time of the settlement of the Swan River Colony. Prior to the construction of the WACA Ground in the 1890s, the park served as the main cricket ground in Perth.

In 1901 the ground was used for four West Australian Football League matches. Between 1906 and 1909 West Australian Football League team East Perth were based at Wellington Square but played home games elsewhere. Perth Rugby Club (later Perth-Bayswater) used the square from the late 1920s as a training venue.

In 2020 the City of Perth began a A$18.7 million upgrade of Wellington Square. The redevelopment included construction of a new playground, basketball courts, new paths and facilities and a place of reflection to commemorate the Stolen Generation. The redevelopment was opened to the public in March 2021.

Moort-ak Waadiny / Wellington Square was dual named by the City of Perth and approved by Landgate on 14 October 2021.

== Current uses ==
The square is used as a meeting place, and occasionally for cricket and athletics by local schools and clubs. It is also used as a live music venue.
