= 1947 WANFL season =

Australian rules football season

- Teams: 8
- Premiers: South Fremantle; 3rd premiership
- Minor premiers: South Fremantle; 3rd minor premiership
- Sandover Medallist: Clive Lewington (South Fremantle)
- Leading goalkicker: Bernie Naylor (South Fremantle)
- Matches played: 80

The 1947 WANFL season was the 63rd season of senior football in Perth, Western Australia. With the background of war completely removed, 1947 saw the WANFL begin a golden age of growth dominated by the two Fremantle clubs, West Perth and Perth, who made the league for the following nine seasons a de facto hierarchy led by South Fremantle and West Perth, who respectively won 128 and 121 of their 159 home-and-away matches between 1947 and 1954. Zones with vastly different populations and large unzoned areas (Note: Pressure from some WANFL board members to eliminate zoning existed as late as 1955.) allowed these more successful and financially secure clubs to monopolise the leading player talent.

The red and whites won their first premiership for thirty seasons – ironically under the leadership of former Cardinal captain-coach Ross Hutchinson who transferred for this season. Perth, in the doldrums with only three finals appearances and three seasons with more wins than losses since 1918, began thirty years of prominence during which they won six premierships. In contrast, Subiaco, after two promising postwar seasons were beset by poor recruiting and conflicts over coaching, so that they lost their first eleven games and fell from third to last. The Maroons were not to again win more than five matches in a season until 1956, nor finish above any rival except Swan Districts until 1957. During the nine seasons beginning with this year Subiaco would win just 32 games out of 179, or a winning rate of 17.88 percent. East Fremantle, after their record undefeated season in 1946, fell to fourth place. Old Easts toured Sydney and Canberra in August during the Carnival, defeating a Canberra team by 77 points at Manuka Oval on 9 August, and a New South Wales state team by 23 points on 10 August.

For the first time the WANFL allowed payments to players in the form of a "Provident Fund" accessed after each player's retirement and totalling 15 shillings per match – increased to 30 shillings in 1956.

== Home-and-away season ==
=== Round 1 ===
	Round 1
Saturday, 26 April (2:45 pm)	Swan Districts 13.12 (90)	def. by	South Fremantle 13.13 (91)	Bassendean Oval (crowd: 2225)
Saturday, 26 April (2:45 pm)	West Perth 16.14 (110)	def.	East Perth 7.14 (56)	Leederville Oval (crowd: 5647)
Saturday, 26 April (2:45 pm)	Claremont 12.11 (83)	def.	Subiaco 7.13 (55)	Subiaco Oval (crowd: 2684)
Saturday, 26 April (2:45 pm)	East Fremantle 12.16 (88)	def.	Perth 9.13 (67)	Fremantle Oval (crowd: 3394)

=== Round 2 (Labour Day) ===
	Round 2
Saturday, 3 May (2:45 pm)	South Fremantle 21.17 (143)	def.	West Perth 5.12 (42)	Fremantle Oval (crowd: 6134)
Saturday, 3 May (2:45 pm)	East Perth 12.16 (88)	def.	Swan Districts 6.6 (42)	Perth Oval (crowd: 3948)
Saturday, 3 May (2:45 pm)	Claremont 8.7 (55)	def. by	Perth 12.11 (83)	Subiaco Oval (crowd: 3231)
Monday, 5 May (2:45 pm)	Subiaco 8.9 (57)	def. by	East Fremantle 15.5 (95)	Subiaco Oval (crowd: 5794)
South Fremantle’s brilliant win over West Perth stakes their claim to challenge Old Easts and remained their biggest victory over the Cardinals until 1979.

=== Round 3 ===
	Round 3
Saturday, 10 May (2:45 pm)	Swan Districts 13.11 (89)	def. by	West Perth 14.17 (101)	Bassendean Oval (crowd: 2967)
Saturday, 10 May (2:45 pm)	South Fremantle 16.20 (116)	def.	East Perth 10.21 (81)	Fremantle Oval (crowd: 5247)
Saturday, 10 May (2:45 pm)	Perth 17.16 (118)	def.	Subiaco 9.5 (59)	WACA (crowd: 3607)
Saturday, 10 May (2:45 pm)	Claremont 9.13 (67)	def. by	East Fremantle 11.14 (80)	Subiaco Oval (crowd: 2755)

=== Round 4 ===
	Round 4
Saturday, 17 May (2:45 pm)	Subiaco 9.6 (60)	def. by	West Perth 10.20 (80)	Subiaco Oval (crowd: 3293)
Saturday, 17 May (2:45 pm)	Perth 14.14 (98)	def.	Swan Districts 11.7 (73)	WACA (crowd: 2557)
Saturday, 17 May (2:45 pm)	East Perth 11.19 (85)	def.	Claremont 10.10 (70)	Perth Oval (crowd: 2760)
Saturday, 17 May (2:45 pm)	East Fremantle 13.12 (90)	def. by	South Fremantle 13.16 (94)	Fremantle Oval (crowd: 16517)
A WANFL record home-and-away crowd (Note: The crowd was originally listed as 17,538.) who paid £973 saw South Fremantle inflict East’s first defeat since 21 July 1945, ending a WANFL record run of thirty-five straight victories.

=== Round 5 ===
	Round 5
Saturday, 24 May (2:45 pm)	Swan Districts 10.10 (70)	def.	Subiaco 9.10 (64)	Bassendean Oval (crowd: 2193)
Saturday, 24 May (2:45 pm)	West Perth 15.9 (99)	def.	Perth 8.14 (62)	Leederville Oval (crowd: 8211)
Saturday, 24 May (2:45 pm)	Claremont 9.5 (59)	def. by	South Fremantle 17.21 (123)	Subiaco Oval (crowd: 3476)
Saturday, 24 May (2:45 pm)	East Fremantle 19.12 (126)	def.	East Perth 8.12 (60)	Fremantle Oval (crowd: 4164)

=== Round 6 (Foundation Day) ===
	Round 6
Saturday, 31 May (2:45 pm)	Perth 5.6 (36)	def. by	East Perth 6.9 (45)	WACA (crowd: 4548)
Saturday, 31 May (2:45 pm)	Claremont 6.10 (46)	def. by	Swan Districts 9.5 (59)	Subiaco Oval (crowd: 2684)
Monday, 2 June (2:45 pm)	South Fremantle 17.12 (114)	def.	Subiaco 8.7 (55)	Fremantle Oval (crowd: 4138)
Monday, 2 June (2:45 pm)	East Fremantle 9.17 (71)	def. by	West Perth 13.12 (90)	Subiaco Oval (crowd: 15048)

=== Round 7 ===
	Round 7
Saturday, 7 June (2:45 pm)	South Fremantle 12.17 (89)	def.	Perth 9.11 (65)	Fremantle Oval (crowd: 3804)
Saturday, 7 June (2:45 pm)	East Perth 9.16 (70)	def.	Subiaco 6.9 (45)	Perth Oval (crowd: 2727)
Saturday, 7 June (2:45 pm)	Claremont 11.18 (84)	def.	West Perth 5.13 (43)	Subiaco Oval (crowd: 3399)
Saturday, 7 June (2:45 pm)	Swan Districts 11.13 (79)	def.	East Fremantle 11.10 (76)	Bassendean Oval (crowd: 2012)
East Perth lodged a protest against Subiaco for playing Bill Ralph, (Note: Father of 1980s Claremont, Carlton and Glenelg spearhead Warren.) who had resided in East Perth’s district before moving to Goomalling, but the protest has no effect because the Maroons lose their eighth consecutive match.

=== Round 8 ===
	Round 8
Saturday, 14 June (2:45 pm)	South Fremantle 11.11 (77)	def.	Swan Districts 8.11 (59)	Fremantle Oval (crowd: 4964)
Saturday, 14 June (2:45 pm)	East Perth 7.11 (53)	def. by	West Perth 12.6 (78)	Perth Oval (crowd: 5368)
Saturday, 14 June (2:45 pm)	Subiaco 8.8 (56)	def. by	Claremont 11.14 (80)	Subiaco Oval (crowd: 2499)
Saturday, 14 June (2:45 pm)	Perth 8.16 (64)	def.	East Fremantle 8.9 (57)	WACA (crowd: 2402)

=== Round 9 ===
	Round 9
Saturday, 21 June (2:45 pm)	West Perth 16.13 (109)	def. by	South Fremantle 18.11 (119)	Leederville Oval (crowd: 14784)
Saturday, 21 June (2:45 pm)	Swan Districts 11.5 (71)	def.	East Perth 10.9 (69)	Bassendean Oval (crowd: 2711)
Saturday, 21 June (2:45 pm)	Perth 11.16 (82)	def.	Claremont 12.6 (78)	WACA (crowd: 2624)
Saturday, 21 June (2:45 pm)	East Fremantle 12.11 (83)	def.	Subiaco 9.13 (67)	Fremantle Oval (crowd: 2099)
Ten goals by Naylor allows South Fremantle to retain their undefeated record in a brilliant match in front of another huge crowd after West Perth looked like winning during the last quarter.

=== Round 10 ===
	Round 10
Saturday, 28 June (2:45 pm)	West Perth 14.19 (103)	def.	Swan Districts 5.9 (39)	Leederville Oval (crowd: 5320)
Saturday, 28 June (2:45 pm)	East Perth 9.16 (70)	def.	South Fremantle 9.15 (69)	Perth Oval (crowd: 4217)
Saturday, 28 June (2:45 pm)	Subiaco 7.5 (47)	def. by	Perth 9.14 (68)	Subiaco Oval (crowd: 1981)
Saturday, 28 June (2:45 pm)	East Fremantle 26.23 (179)	def.	Claremont 11.4 (70)	Fremantle Oval (crowd: 3618)
East Perth end a long South Fremantle winning run in a thrilling game where the Royals held the ascendancy before a late red and white rally give them the lead – only for Matson to kick the winning goal.

=== Round 11 ===
	Round 11
Saturday, 5 July (2:45 pm)	West Perth 9.9 (63)	def.	Subiaco 7.14 (56)	Leederville Oval (crowd: 2977)
Saturday, 5 July (2:45 pm)	Swan Districts 3.5 (23)	def. by	Perth 17.19 (121)	Bassendean Oval (crowd: 2780)
Saturday, 5 July (2:45 pm)	Claremont 7.5 (47)	def. by	East Perth 20.16 (136)	Subiaco Oval (crowd: 3401)
Saturday, 5 July (2:45 pm)	East Fremantle 9.10 (64)	def. by	South Fremantle 12.13 (85)	Fremantle Oval (crowd: 15263)
In equalling their record low score against Perth from the previous season, Swan Districts kick the lowest score at Bassendean Oval until 1964 and still the second-lowest ever there.

=== Round 12 ===
	Round 12
Saturday, 12 July (2:45 pm)	Subiaco 17.20 (122)	def.	Swan Districts 6.4 (40)	Subiaco Oval (crowd: 1801)
Saturday, 12 July (2:45 pm)	Perth 6.8 (44)	def. by	West Perth 6.11 (47)	WACA (crowd: 3343)
Saturday, 12 July (2:45 pm)	South Fremantle 14.14 (98)	def.	Claremont 6.9 (45)	Fremantle Oval (crowd: 2363)
Saturday, 12 July (2:45 pm)	East Perth 4.14 (38)	def. by	East Fremantle 7.10 (52)	Perth Oval (crowd: 5665)
On an extremely muddy W.A.C.A. ground, West Perth produce a fine comeback win to move effectively two wins clear in second position.

=== Round 13 ===
	Round 13
Saturday, 19 July (2:45 pm)	Subiaco 10.8 (68)	def.	South Fremantle 9.6 (60)	Subiaco Oval (crowd: 2097)
Saturday, 19 July (2:45 pm)	Perth 9.11 (65)	def.	East Perth 9.6 (60)	WACA (crowd: 3088)
Saturday, 19 July (2:45 pm)	Swan Districts 6.9 (45)	def. by	Claremont 7.7 (49)	Bassendean Oval (crowd: 836)
Saturday, 19 July (2:45 pm)	East Fremantle 11.15 (81)	def.	West Perth 10.14 (74)	Fremantle Oval (crowd: 3260)
In a round of thrilling matches in "wretched" weather with 41.4 millimetres (1.63 in) of rain and deep mud, Perth and East Fremantle manage thrilling victories to be two games play 20 percent clear in fourth with six rounds to play.

=== Round 14 ===
	Round 14
Saturday, 26 July (2:45 pm)	Perth 5.12 (42)	def. by	South Fremantle 9.5 (59)	WACA (crowd: 5298)
Saturday, 26 July (2:45 pm)	Subiaco 9.17 (71)	def.	East Perth 7.15 (57)	Subiaco Oval (crowd: 4647)
Saturday, 26 July (2:45 pm)	West Perth 16.20 (116)	def.	Claremont 13.6 (84)	Leederville Oval (crowd: 3232)
Saturday, 26 July (2:45 pm)	East Fremantle 16.12 (108)	def.	Swan Districts 8.10 (58)	Fremantle Oval (crowd: 1764)

=== Round 15 ===
	Round 15
Saturday, 19 April (2:45 pm)	East Fremantle 22.15 (147)	def.	Subiaco 10.5 (65)	Fremantle Oval (crowd: 5085)
Saturday, 16 August (2:45 pm)	South Fremantle 15.9 (99)	def.	West Perth 12.17 (89)	Fremantle Oval (crowd: 8477)
Saturday, 16 August (2:45 pm)	Swan Districts 11.11 (77)	def. by	East Perth 15.12 (102)	Bassendean Oval (crowd: 1586)
Saturday, 16 August (2:45 pm)	Perth 12.13 (85)	def. by	Claremont 15.12 (102)	WACA (crowd: 3734)
The East Fremantle versus Subiaco match was put forward to the week before Round 1 to permit Old Easts to tour New South Wales.; WANFL matches were suspended for two weeks for the 1947 Hobart Carnival.

=== Round 16 ===
	Round 16
Saturday, 23 August (2:45 pm)	West Perth 22.16 (148)	def.	Swan Districts 12.8 (80)	Leederville Oval (crowd: 2648)
Saturday, 23 August (2:45 pm)	East Perth 11.20 (86)	def. by	South Fremantle 14.16 (100)	Perth Oval (crowd: 7184)
Saturday, 23 August (2:45 pm)	Subiaco 11.16 (82)	def. by	Perth 11.20 (86)	Subiaco Oval (crowd: 3852)
Saturday, 23 August (2:45 pm)	East Fremantle 15.18 (108)	def.	Claremont 11.12 (78)	Fremantle Oval (crowd: 3014)
Perth gain a critical win after Subiaco – in their first match for four weeks after three straight wins – kick 6.6 (42) to 1.2 (8) in the last quarter and pound the Redleg backs who nonetheless manage to hold.

=== Round 17 ===
	Round 17
Saturday, 30 August (2:45 pm)	West Perth 16.16 (112)	def.	Subiaco 12.10 (82)	Leederville Oval (crowd: 4408)
Saturday, 30 August (2:45 pm)	Swan Districts 9.14 (68)	def. by	Perth 20.15 (135)	Bassendean Oval (crowd: 1198)
Saturday, 30 August (2:45 pm)	East Perth 17.14 (116)	def.	Claremont 13.11 (89)	Perth Oval (crowd: 3013)
Saturday, 30 August (2:45 pm)	East Fremantle 19.14 (128)	def.	South Fremantle 14.13 (97)	Fremantle Oval (crowd: 11411)
East Fremantle score a critical win after it was close at three-quarter time to remain second, 18 percent ahead of West Perth.

=== Round 18 ===
	Round 18
Saturday, 6 September (2:45 pm)	South Fremantle 25.15 (165)	def.	Perth 13.16 (94)	Fremantle Oval (crowd: 5443)
Saturday, 6 September (2:45 pm)	Subiaco 10.14 (74)	def. by	East Perth 19.12 (126)	Subiaco Oval (crowd: 3625)
Saturday, 6 September (2:45 pm)	West Perth 16.17 (113)	def.	Claremont 9.12 (66)	Leederville Oval (crowd: 3779)
Saturday, 6 September (2:45 pm)	Swan Districts 13.12 (90)	def. by	East Fremantle 21.13 (139)	Bassendean Oval (crowd: 748)
Perth, who had coped successfully with the loss of Merv McIntosh during the Hobart Carnival with a swollen hand are in danger of losing their seemingly secure finals berth as a depleted South Fremantle runs over them in the first half. Naylor kicks fourteen goals and South Fremantle’s centreline and rovers are breathtaking.

=== Round 19 ===
	Round 19
Saturday, 13 September (2:45 pm)	South Fremantle 13.16 (94)	def.	Subiaco 5.11 (41)	Fremantle Oval (crowd: 1276)
Saturday, 13 September (2:45 pm)	East Perth 7.9 (51)	def.	Perth 7.6 (48)	Perth Oval (crowd: 3918)
Saturday, 13 September (2:45 pm)	Claremont 12.13 (85)	def.	Swan Districts 9.15 (69)	Subiaco Oval (crowd: 535)
Saturday, 13 September (2:45 pm)	West Perth 11.10 (76)	def.	East Fremantle 8.6 (54)	Leederville Oval (crowd: 4580)
On a very wet afternoon, East Perth’s late rally fails to given them the five-goal margin needed to make the four.; Six goals from Ray Scott ensures West Perth take the double chance in a high-standard game where Old Easts fade out after an impressive start.

== Ladder ==
1947 ladder
Pos	Team	Pld	W	L	D	PF	PA	PP	Pts
1	South Fremantle (P)	19	16	3	0	1892	1377	137.4	64
2	West Perth	19	14	5	0	1693	1422	119.1	56
3	East Fremantle	19	13	6	0	1826	1376	132.7	52
4	Perth	19	10	9	0	1463	1347	108.6	40
5	East Perth	19	10	9	0	1449	1386	104.5	40
6	Claremont	19	6	13	0	1337	1731	77.2	24
7	Swan Districts	19	4	15	0	1221	1822	67.0	16
8	Subiaco	19	3	16	0	1226	1646	74.5	12

Source: WAFL Footy Facts
Rules for classification: 1) points; 2) percentage; 3) number of points for.
(P) Premiers

== Finals ==
=== First semi-final ===
	First semi-final
Saturday, 20 September (2:45 pm)	East Fremantle 10.18 (78)	def. by	Perth 14.10 (94)	Subiaco Oval (crowd: 15,808)
Old Easts’ inaccuracy gives the less experienced Redlegs, led by McIntosh and former St. Kilda defender Marcel Hilsz, an upset win as they dominate after quarter-time.

=== Second semi-final ===
	Second semi-final
Saturday, 27 September (2:45 pm)	South Fremantle 20.8 (128)	def.	West Perth 13.9 (87)	Subiaco Oval (crowd: 23,847)

=== Preliminary final ===
Saturday, 4 October (2:45 pm)	West Perth 16.12 (108)	def.	Perth 13.10 (88)	Subiaco Oval (crowd: 21,168)
West Perth recover from a slow start to end Perth’s brave finals challenge, taking decisive control ten minutes into the last quarter.

=== Grand Final ===
1947 WANFL Grand Final
Saturday, 11 October (2:45 pm)	South Fremantle	def.	West Perth	Subiaco Oval (crowd: 27,112)
1.1 (7); 8.2 (50); 8.4 (52); 13.8 (86)	Q1; Q2; Q3; Final	3.9 (27); 4.10 (34); 9.15 (69); 9.17 (71)	Umpires: D. Cronin; Simpson Medal: Erik Eriksson (South Fremantle)
Naylor 4, Marsh 3, Murray 3, Hutchinson 2, Carbon	Goals	Scott 2, Bridges, Larcombe, Clamp, Lamb, Buttsworth, Kingsbury, Lind
Eriksson (best on ground), Renfrey, Marsh, Reilly, Jenkins, F. Price, Graham	Best	Lamb, Harman, Porter, Larcombe, Loughridge, Bridges, Kingsbury
Injuries	Buttsworth (limp); Harman (cramp)
In a match marred by the collapse of the wall onto Roberts Road under pressure from the crowd South Fremantle take advantage of the Cardinals’ poor kicking in very windy conditions to claim their first premiership since 1917 – and begin a WANFL dynasty.
