= Fremantle Football Club (1882–1886) =

Fremantle FC (1882–1886)

Fremantle

Names
- Full name: Fremantle Football Club

Club details
- Founded: 1882 (as a rugby club)
- Dissolved: 1886
- Colours: blue and white
- Competition: WAFA
- Ground(s): Fremantle Park

The Fremantle Football Club was an Australian rules football club, based in Fremantle, Western Australia, that played in the Western Australian Football Association (WAFA) from 1885 to 1886. The team won the WAFA premiership in 1886. The club played their games at the Esplanade in Fremantle, on the present site of the Fremantle railway station.

== History ==
=== Formation ===
The club was formed in 1882 as a rugby football club.

In 1883 the club was the primary instigator of the change of most Western Australian clubs from rugby football to Victorian rules, which later became known as Australian rules football.

=== WAFA ===
The club was a founding member of the Western Australian Football Association in 1885. In the inaugural season, Fremantle finished third out of three teams, behind Rovers, Victorians and a High School team which dropped out of the competition two rounds into the season. The next season, 1886, the team finished first in the league to claim the premiership. The club recorded large victories over most of the competition, including 6–2 against both Rovers and Unions and 4–1 against Victorians. The club's most notable player during this period was the captain Bill Bateman, an inaugural inductee of the West Australian Football Hall of Fame. The club went defunct at the end of the 1886 season, with most of its players transferring to Unions, also based in Fremantle, who adopted the name "Fremantle Football Club" in 1890.

== Officials ==
Fremantle Football Club Leadership
Season	Secretary	Captain
1882		F.E. Stafford
1883		D Jose
1884	H. Albert	F. Gallop
1885	A.W. Newman; J.J. Broomhall	W.A. Bateman
1886	G.F. Payne	W.A. Bateman

== Honours ==
=== Premierships ===
- WAFA:

1886

Preceded by Rovers	WAFA Premiers; 1886	Succeeded by Unions
