= Midland Junction Football Club =

Midland Junction

Names
- Full name: Midland Junction Football Club
- Nickname(s): Railways

Club details
- Founded: pre-1905
- Dissolved: 1917
- Colours: black and gold
- Competition: First Rate Junior Association (pre-1905, 1911–13); West Australian Football League (1905–10; 1914–17)
- Premierships: 1 (1911)
- Ground(s): Midland Junction

Midland Junction Football Club, nicknamed the Railways, was an Australian rules football club that competed in the West Australian Football League (WAFL). (Note: The West Australian Football League was originally named the West Australian Football Association. The league was renamed in 1908 and the First Rate Junior Association was subsequently renamed the West Australian Football Association. To avoid confusion, the West Australian Football League is referred to as the WAFL throughout the article.) The club played in the WAFL, the premier football league in Western Australia, from 1905 to 1910 and again from 1914 to 1917. The team wore black and gold hooped jumpers for the majority of the seasons they played in the WAFL. Charles "Wagga" Gast was Midland Junction's games record holder, playing 105 matches for the club. Based in the Perth suburb of Midland, the team drew the majority of their players from workers at the Midland Junction railway station and workshops. The club was one of the most unsuccessful in the WAFL's history, winning only 24.8% of the matches they contested.

== History ==
Originally from the First Rate Junior Association, Midland Junction joined the WAFL in 1905. With the admission of Midland Junction (and East Perth in 1906), the WAFL expanded to an eight team competition. In their first season in the WAFL, Midland Junction finished in the bottom two and won only two matches for the entire season. After several poor seasons, Midland Junction were demoted from the WAFL at the conclusion of the 1910 season and they subsequently rejoined the First Rate Junior Association (renamed in 1907 to the West Australian Football Association). In their first season back in the WAFA, Midland Junction won the premiership, defeating Cottesloe in the Grand Final. After two more seasons in the WAFA, Midland Junction returned to the WAFL in 1914. Midland Junction's second stint in the WAFL began much more successfully than the first. In 1915, the club won more matches than it lost for the first time and in 1916 they scored a resounding 78-point victory over West Perth. That victory, however, was to be the high point of Midland Junction's history. Midway through the 1916 season, the club was "decimated" as many of the team's players signed up to fight in World War I. This started a decline for Midland Junction which resulted in them losing every match in the 1917 season. After such a disappointing season and with many of their players still fighting overseas, Midland Junction elected to disband at the season's end. The club never reformed.

== See also ==
- Swan Districts Football Club, formed in 1932 and covering approximately the same territory
