= Fremantle Football Club (1882–1899) =

Australian rules football club

Fremantle

Names
- Full name: Union Football Club (1882–89); Fremantle Football Club (1890–99)

Club details
- Founded: 1882
- Dissolved: 1899
- Colours: blue & white (1882-1885) black & white (1886) red & white (1887–99)
- Competition: WAFA
- Ground: Fremantle Park

The Fremantle Football Club was an Australian rules football club based in Fremantle, Western Australia, that played in the Western Australian Football Association (WAFA) from 1886 to 1899. The club was known as the Union Football Club from 1882–89.

== History ==
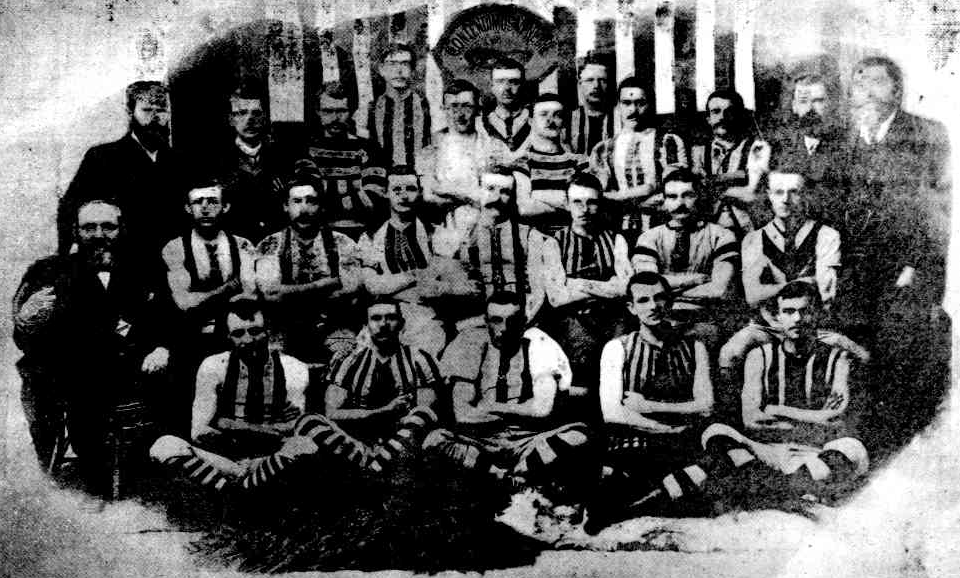
Fremantle Football Club WA premiers 1893

=== Formation ===
Union was formed in 1882 at the same time as the original Fremantle Football Club. A few months after the football season had begun that year, an editorial in The West Australian captured the unfamiliarity of Western Australians with Australian rules football at the time.

It seems a pity however that the Perth players do not all play the same game; while three of the clubs are governed by the rules known as those of the Rugby Union, the fourth (which goes by the name of the Union Club) plays the Victorian game; and there is every reason to believe that the latter club is in the right. The Victorian or "Bouncing" rules are those which are universally adopted in the other Australian colonies; why then should West {sic} Australia be the exception? It is needless here to enter into an argument as to which is the better of the two games, but supposing West {sic} Australia were to receive a challenge at football from one of the sister colonies, what must; be our reply? "We are not able to accept your challenge, because we do not know your rules."

In 1884 the club won a football season that was played using rugby union rules, having played games against High School, Juniors, and a third unnamed team.

The club was not invited to participate in the formation of the Western Australian Football Association in 1885, at the time being considered a "junior club". (Note: At the time, clubs were divided into "Senior" and "Junior". These distinctions had nothing to do with age, rather to do with ability and status amongst other clubs.) As was the norm of the time, the club also occasionally played matches under the rugby union rules.

=== WAFA ===
In 1886, Unions was admitted to the WAFA, giving the city of Fremantle two representatives in the competition. The club finished last in their first season, and in games early in the season, were allowed to field additional players to compensate for the team being considered a junior club. The original Fremantle Football Club disbanded at the end of the season, and many of its players transferred to Unions. The club also took Fremantle's colours of red and white, having previously worn black and white.

The club won their first premiership in 1887, receiving the "Dixson Challenge Cup", which was followed by two more in 1888, 1889. "The Dixson Challenge Cup was to be awarded annually to the premier club and it was stipulated that when a club won it for three seasons (not necessarily in successive years) the cup would become absolute property of that club."

The club having won the premiership from 1887-1889, became permanent holders of the Dixson Challenge Cup. "The club awarded the cup to its premiership captain of 1889, Paddy Knox."

The club changed its name to "Fremantle Football Club" in April 1890 to better represent the locality in which they were based. A third successive Premiership followed in 1890. In 1891, the club were unbeaten up until round 6. In round 7, they lost against their only serious rivals for the premiership, Rovers, after several contentious decision made by the umpire, a Mr. Croft, who formerly played for Rovers. Due to his previous decisions, Fremantle refused to play in any match umpired by him for the remainder of the season, which resulted in them forfeiting their last three fixtures, and thus losing the premiership to Rovers.

The club continued to dominate the competition for the rest of the decade, winning five consecutive premierships from 1892–96 and another in 1898. The club was forced to disband after the 1899 season due to large debts. Many of the club's players transferred to the new South Fremantle Football Club, admitted to the WAFA the next year. The club had an overall win rate of 68.7% during its fourteen seasons in the competition.

== Honours ==
=== Premierships ===
- WAFA (10):

1887–90, 1892–96, 1898

=== Leading goalkicker ===
- WAFA (4):

1893: Paddy Knox (10)
1895: Albert Thurgood (53)
1896: Albert Thurgood (47)
1897: Albert Thurgood (27)

- Union/Fremantle FC

1886: Harry Fay & George Herbert (2)
1887: Fred Loukes & Andy Woods (2)
1888: Leo Waters (7)
1889: Harry Fay (7)
1890: Patrick Roachock (10)
1891: Oscar Wehrstedt (4)
1892: Harry Fay (15)
1893: Paddy Knox (10)
1893: Harry Cooper (19)
1895: Albert Thurgood (53)
1896: Albert Thurgood (47)
1897: Albert Thurgood (27)
1898: Harry Fay & George Kain (12)
1899: William Annois (16)

=== Notable players ===
By far the highest-profile player to represent the club was Albert Thurgood, who arrived from Essendon Football Club for the 1895 season. Thurgood would go on to represent the club 48 times and kicked 128 goals from 1895-1898. He topped the WAFA goalkicking from 1895-1897. In 1996, Thurgood was inducted into the Australian Football Hall of Fame. He was named in the Essendon Team of the Century, which was selected in their VFL/AFL centenary year of 1997. Nicknamed "The Great", he was inducted into the WA Football Hall of Fame in 2004 as an inaugural inductee. The Fremantle Football Club and Essendon Football Club created the "Albert Thurgood Challenge" to be played between the two teams. The first ever meeting was known as D-Day. On 11 February 1995 Fremantle won its first official game of AFL, defeating Essendon by 50 points at East Fremantle Oval.

Bill Bateman, one of the leading men behind the push for "Victorian Rules" to become the dominant football code in Western Australia, represented the club from 1887-1894 for 40 matches and was inducted into the WA Football Hall of Fame in 2004 as an inaugural inductee.

Paddy Knox represented the club from 1888-1894, for a total of 63 games, including six premierships (1888-1890, 1892-94) and captaining the side to four premierships (1889-1890, 1892-93). He was the first person made a life member of the Western Australian Football Association (WAFA) in 1902 and was inducted into the WA Football Hall of Fame in 2004 as an inaugural inductee.

== Notes ==
Preceded by Fremantle; Rovers; West Perth	WAFA Premiers; 1887–90; 1892–96; 1898	Succeeded by Rovers; West Perth; West Perth
