= Rovers Football Club (1882–1899) =

Former WAFA football club 1885–1899

Rovers

Names
- Full name: Rovers Football Club
- Nickname: Rovers

Club details
- Founded: 1882; 144 years ago
- Dissolved: 1899; 127 years ago
- Colours: Yellow; Black
- Competition: Western Australian Football Association
- Premierships: 2 (1885, 1891)
- Ground: none

The Rovers Football Club was an Australian rules football club that competed in the Western Australian Football Association (WAFA) from 1885 to 1899. The club won the premiership in 1885 and 1891.

== History ==
Rovers began as a rugby union club in 1882. The club was founded by a meeting of twenty men at the Union Services Hotel in Perth. The meeting decided the name of the club, the code of football they would play, and their colours, which were an amber and black jersey with blue or black trousers. E. Steere was elected as the club's first captain. Along with other West Australian clubs, Rovers made the switch to Australian rules football in 1885.

Rovers were one of four teams that formed the WAFA in 1885 and were invited to compete in the inaugural competition: the others were Fremantle, High School, and Victorians.

The High School team dropped out two rounds into the season; the remaining teams played a six round season, with Rovers winning three and drawing two of its games to become the inaugural premiers of the WAFA.

After several competitive seasons, Rovers won the premiership in 1891. The establishment of electorate football was the beginning of the end, as the club finished second last in 1892 and 1898, and won four wooden spoons between 1893 and 1897, including a winless 1893.

After losing the first eight games of 1899, Rovers dropped out of the competition and folded, replaced by First Rate Junior Association side Perth; many players transferred to the new club.

== See also ==
- Wikipedia listing of Rovers Football Club players
