= List of West Australian Football League premiers =

This is a list of the West Australian Football League premiers, the premier state-based Australian rules football league in Western Australia, and includes premiers of the Western Australian Football Association (1885–1906), West Australian Football League (1907-1924, 1980-1989, 1991-1996 and 2001-present), Western Australian Football League (1925-1927), Western Australian National Football League (1928–1979), WA State League (1990), and Westar Rules (1997–2000).

In 1967, WAFL football historian Dave Clement discovered a discrepancy between the official premiership list as published by the league and what he had determined from examination of records from the time. The original list has Fremantle winning six of the first seven premierships; however, documentation was found that the Unions club had won three premierships in succession. The discrepancy was not officially acknowledged and fixed until the League's centenary in 1985.

In the early years, a number of cups were awarded to clubs who won the premiership, including the "Dixson Cup" and the "Farley Cup".

On March 27, 1907, the WAFA was renamed the West Australian Football League (WAFL). The 1907 grand final ended in a controversial manner, after Perth won their first premiership after a protest.

On Wednesday October 12, 1927, the WAFL was renamed the Western Australian National Football League (WANFL) – the "national" in the name being adopted by the SANFL, TANFL and other leagues when the Australian Football Council became the Australian National Football Council earlier in that year.

Prior to 1931, premierships were either awarded to the team leading the ladder or who won a final. If the top team lost the final, then they had the right to call for a challenge match to be played the following week to determine the premiership.

In 1931 the system changed to the Page finals system where the top two teams play in the second semi final, with the loser having a second chance and the winner progressing straight to the Grand Final. The winner of the third and fourth placed teams who played in the first semi final play the loser of the second semi final in the preliminary final.

Since 1945, the best player on ground in the Grand Final has been awarded the Simpson Medal.

In 2016, the Australian Football League determined the provision to play extra time (ET) in the event of a draw, ensuring that future grand finals will always be decided on the scheduled day. In the event of a drawn game, the teams will play two extra time periods in full, each lasting three minutes plus time on, with a change of ends after the first period: if still tied, further pairs of extra time periods will be played in the same manner until a winner is determined. As of season 2025, extra time has not yet been required to decide a grand final. Previously, a drawn grand final would be replayed the following week to determine the premier. This occurred on two occasions: in 1905, and 1938.

== Premiers ==
Premiership decided by a Grand Final
Premiership decided by a Grand Final Replay/ET, after the scheduled Grand Final was drawn
Premiership decided by a Challenge Final
Premiership decided without any form of Grand Final

Season	Premiers	Runners up	Score	Captain	Coach	Venue	Attendance
Western Australian Football Association (1885–1906)
1885	Rovers	Victorians					
1886	Fremantle	Victorians (2)					
1887	Unions	Victorians (3)					
1888	Unions (2)	Rovers					
1889	Unions (3)	Rovers (2)					
1890	Fremantle (II) (4)	Metropolitan					
1891	Rovers (2)	West Perth					
1892	Fremantle (II) (5)	West Perth (2)					
1893	Fremantle (II) (6)	West Perth (3)					
1894	Fremantle (II) (7)	West Perth (4)					
1895	Fremantle (II) (8)	Rovers (3)		Poss Watson			
1896	Fremantle (II) (9)	Imperials		Poss Watson			
1897	West Perth	Imperials (2)		Barney Grecian			
1898	Fremantle (II) (10)	West Perth (5)		Poss Watson			
1899	West Perth (2)	East Fremantle		Barney Grecian			
1900	East Fremantle	South Fremantle		Thomas C Wilson			
1901	West Perth (3)	East Fremantle (2)		Les Jones & Billy Plunkett			
1902	East Fremantle (2)	North Fremantle		John Atkinson Chadwick			
1903	East Fremantle (3)	West Perth (6)		John Atkinson Chadwick			
1904	East Fremantle (4)	Perth	12.11 (83) – 3.7 (25)	Thomas C Wilson			
1905	West Perth (4)	East Fremantle (3)	5.11 (41) drew 6.5 (41)	Billy Plunkett & Shooter Ford			
1905	West Perth (4)	East Fremantle (3)	4.7 (31) – 3.9 (27) (Replay)	Billy Plunkett & Shooter Ford			
1906	East Fremantle (5)	West Perth (7)	12.3 (75) – 5.6 (36)	Thomas C Wilson			
West Australian Football League (1907–1927)
1907	Perth	East Fremantle (4)	6.6 (42) – 6.11 (47)	Jack Leckie		Claremont Showground	
1907	Perth	East Fremantle (4)	6.6 (42) – 5.11 (41)	Jack Leckie		Claremont Showground	
1908	East Fremantle (6)	Perth (2)	5.7 (37) – 0.8 (8)	Thomas C Wilson		Fremantle Oval	
1909	East Fremantle (7)	Perth (3)	8.8 (56) – 4.6 (30)	Thomas C Wilson		WACA Ground	
1910	East Fremantle (8)	East Perth	5.5 (35) – 2.10 (22)	James Doig		Fremantle Oval	
1911	East Fremantle (9)	West Perth (8)	14.12 (96) – 7.3 (45)	James Doig		Subiaco Oval	
1912	Subiaco	East Fremantle (5)	5.8 (38) – 4.5 (29)			Perth Oval	
1913	Subiaco (2)	Perth (4)	6.7 (43) – 4.7 (31)			WACA Ground	
1914	East Fremantle (10)	South Fremantle (2)	5.13 (43) – 3.6 (24)	Harry Sharpe		Subiaco Oval	
1915	Subiaco (3)	Perth (5)	3.3 (21) – 2.7 (19)			Perth Oval	
1916	South Fremantle	East Fremantle (6)	7.12 (54) – 5.5 (35)	F Collins		WACA Ground	
1917	South Fremantle (2)	East Fremantle (7)	6.5 (41) – 3.8 (26)	F Collins		WACA Ground	
1918	East Fremantle (11)	East Perth (2)	11.8 (74) – 8.5 (53)	W. J. “Nipper” Truscott		Subiaco Oval	
1919	East Perth	East Fremantle (8)	10.8 (68) – 7.4 (46)	Chris Slattery		WACA Ground	
1920	East Perth (2)	East Fremantle (9)	6.16 (52) – 4.6 (30)	Charlie McKenzie & Chris Slattery		WACA Ground	
1921	East Perth (3)	East Fremantle (10)	5.9 (39) – 4.8 (32)	Vern Harold & Charlie McKenzie		Subiaco Oval	
1922	East Perth (4)	West Perth (9)	7.13 (55) – 5.9 (39)	Vern Harold		Subiaco Oval	12,721
1923	East Perth (5)	East Fremantle (11)	9.9 (63) – 7.4 (46)	Vern Harold		Subiaco Oval	16,371
1924	Subiaco (4)	East Fremantle (12)	7.9 (51) – 3.6 (24)	Snowy Hamilton		Perth Oval	10,519
1925	East Fremantle (12)	Subiaco	10.10 (70) – 6.7 (43)	John “Jerry” Dolan		Perth Oval	15,112
1926	East Perth (6)	Subiaco (2)	11.19 (85) – 5.5 (35)	Harold Gepp		WACA Ground	8,722
1927	East Perth (7)	South Fremantle (3)	10.12 (72) – 7.9 (51)	Harold Gepp		Subiaco Oval	15,714
Western Australian National Football League (1928–1979)
1928	East Fremantle (13)	East Perth (3)	10.13 (73) – 8.8 (56)	John “Jerry” Dolan		Subiaco Oval	15,599
1929	East Fremantle (14)	South Fremantle (4)	8.22 (70) – 5.9 (39)	Dinny Coffey		Subiaco Oval	10,729
1930	East Fremantle (15)	South Fremantle (5)	12.15 (87) – 9.11 (65)	Jerry Dolan		Subiaco Oval	7,654
1931	East Fremantle (16)	Subiaco (3)	9.13 (67) – 7.7 (49)	Juda Bee	Barney Sheedy	Subiaco Oval	10,859
1932	West Perth (5)	East Perth (4)	18.9 (117) – 11.8 (74)	Jack Cashman	Jack Cashman	Subiaco Oval	16,709
1933	East Fremantle (17)	Subiaco (4)	10.13 (73) – 7.7 (49)	Jerry Dolan	Jerry Dolan	Subiaco Oval	15,919
1934	West Perth (6)	East Fremantle (13)	11.7 (73) – 5.9 (39)	Don Marinko, Sr.	Johnny Leonard	Perth Oval	10,464
1935	West Perth (7)	Subiaco (5)	11.8 (74) – 7.9 (51)	Don Marinko, Sr.	Johnny Leonard	Perth Oval	19,154
1936	East Perth (8)	Claremont	11.5 (71) – 9.6 (60)	Mick Cronin	Jerry Dolan	Subiaco Oval	20.874
1937	East Fremantle (18)	Claremont (2)	14.13 (97) – 13.9 (87)	Ross Hutchinson	Ross Hutchinson	Subiaco Oval	16,460
1938	Claremont	East Fremantle (14)	13.16 (94) drew 14.10 (94)	George Moloney	Johnny Leonard	Subiaco Oval	19,104
1938	Claremont	East Fremantle (14)	14.17 (101) – 11.13 (79) (Replay)	George Moloney	Johnny Leonard	Subiaco Oval	15,402
1939	Claremont (2)	East Fremantle (15)	14.11 (95) – 11.10 (76)	George Moloney	Johnny Leonard	Subiaco Oval	18,193
1940	Claremont (3)	South Fremantle (6)	13.13 (91) – 9.20 (74)	George Moloney	Johnny Leonard	Subiaco Oval	19,876
1941	West Perth (8)	East Fremantle (16)	14.14 (98) – 10.17 (77)	Spike Pola	Ross Hutchinson	Subiaco Oval	15,835
1942	West Perth (9)	Claremont (3)	19.16 (130) – 11.13 (79)	Len Harman	Joe Brooker	Subiaco Oval	5,308
1943	East Fremantle (19)	Swan Districts	17.15 (117) – 11.11 (77)	Jim Conway	Jerry Dolan	Subiaco Oval	8,415
1944	East Perth (9)	East Fremantle (17)	14.13 (97) – 4.17 (41)	Allan Watts	Cec Rowland	Subiaco Oval	8,991
1945	East Fremantle (20)	South Fremantle (7)	12.15 (87) – 7.9 (51)	George Meiers	Jerry Dolan	Subiaco Oval	21,000
1946	East Fremantle (21)	West Perth (10)	11.13 (79) – 10.13 (73)	Charlie Doig	Jerry Dolan	Subiaco Oval	24,841
1947	South Fremantle (3)	West Perth (11)	13.8 (86) – 9.17 (71)	Ross Hutchinson	Ross Hutchinson	Subiaco Oval	27,112
1948	South Fremantle (4)	West Perth (12)	13.9 (87) – 8.15 (63)	Clive Lewington	Ross Hutchinson	Subiaco Oval	28,660
1949	West Perth (10)	Perth (6)	16.13 (109) – 12.7 (79)	Stan Heal	Stan Heal	Subiaco Oval	34,039
1950	South Fremantle (5)	Perth (7)	12.23 (95) – 13.11 (89)	Clive Lewington	Clive Lewington	Subiaco Oval	31,325
1951	West Perth (11)	South Fremantle (8)	13.10 (88) – 12.13 (85)	Ray Schofield	Stan Heal	Subiaco Oval	30,006
1952	South Fremantle (6)	West Perth (13)	12.19 (91) – 10.10 (70)	Harry Carbon	Clive Lewington	Subiaco Oval	29,701
1953	South Fremantle (7)	West Perth (14)	18.12 (120) – 8.13 (61)	Steve Marsh	Clive Lewington	Subiaco Oval	34,207
1954	South Fremantle (8)	East Fremantle (18)	21.14 (140) – 9.8 (62)	Frank Treasure	Clive Lewington	Subiaco Oval	36,098
1955	Perth (2)	East Fremantle (19)	11.11 (77) – 11.9 (75)	Keith Harper	Ern Henfry	Subiaco Oval	41,659
1956	East Perth (10)	South Fremantle (9)	10.17 (77) – 9.10 (64)	Jack Sheedy	Jack Sheedy	Subiaco Oval	34,959
1957	East Fremantle (22)	East Perth (5)	10.18 (78) – 9.8 (62)	Steve Marsh	Steve Marsh	Subiaco Oval	38,021
1958	East Perth (11)	East Fremantle (20)	8.17 (65) – 8.15 (63)	Tom Everett	Jack Sheedy	Subiaco Oval	36,668
1959	East Perth (12)	Subiaco (6)	12.19 (91) – 9.14 (68)	Jack Sheedy	Jack Sheedy	Subiaco Oval	45,245
1960	West Perth (12)	East Perth (6)	17.13 (115) – 12.11 (83)	Brian Foley	Arthur Olliver	Subiaco Oval	42,850
1961	Swan Districts	East Perth (7)	17.9 (111) – 12.15 (87)	Haydn Bunton, Jr.	Haydn Bunton, Jr.	Subiaco Oval	41,102
1962	Swan Districts (2)	East Fremantle (21)	14.10 (94) – 10.16 (76)	Haydn Bunton, Jr.	Haydn Bunton, Jr.	Subiaco Oval	46,659
1963	Swan Districts (3)	East Fremantle (22)	17.10 (112) – 13.12 (90)	Haydn Bunton, Jr.	Haydn Bunton, Jr.	Subiaco Oval	41,101
1964	Claremont (4)	East Fremantle (23)	14.18 (102) – 15.8 (98)	Les Mumme	Jim Conway	Subiaco Oval	45,102
1965	East Fremantle (24)	Swan Districts (2)	18.18 (126) – 16.6 (102)	Bob Johnson	Bob Johnson	Subiaco Oval	46,744
1966	Perth (3)	East Perth (8)	11.25 (91) – 10.15 (75)	Mal Atwell	Mal Atwell	Subiaco Oval	46,763
1967	Perth (4)	East Perth (9)	18.12 (120) – 15.12 (102)	Mal Atwell	Mal Atwell	Subiaco Oval	42,625
1968	Perth (5)	East Perth (10)	16.14 (110) – 13.8 (86)	Mal Atwell	Mal Atwell	Subiaco Oval	40,315
1969	West Perth (13)	East Perth (11)	21.21 (147) – 10.14 (74)	Graham Farmer	Graham Farmer	Subiaco Oval	51,385
1970	South Fremantle (9)	Perth (8)	15.7 (97) – 6.18 (54)	Hassa Mann	Hassa Mann	Subiaco Oval	40,620
1971	West Perth (14)	East Perth (12)	14.17 (101) – 9.15 (69)	Graham Farmer	Graham Farmer	Subiaco Oval	50,975
1972	East Perth (13)	Claremont (4)	9.17 (71) – 8.8 (56)	Mal Brown	Mal Brown	Subiaco Oval	46,055
1973	Subiaco (5)	West Perth (15)	10.12 (72) – 6.4 (40)	Ross Smith	Ross Smith	Subiaco Oval	46,885
1974	East Fremantle (24)	Perth (9)	17.20 (122) – 15.10 (100)	Graham Melrose	John Todd	Subiaco Oval	40,758
1975	West Perth (15)	South Fremantle (10)	23.17 (155) – 7.9 (51)	Bill Dempsey	Graham Campbell	Subiaco Oval	52,322
1976	Perth (6)	East Perth (13)	13.14 (92) – 11.3 (69)	Colin Lofts	Ken Armstrong	Subiaco Oval	45,823
1977	Perth (7)	East Fremantle (24)	26.13 (169) – 14.12 (96)	Colin Lofts	Ken Armstrong	Subiaco Oval	44,381
1978	East Perth (14)	Perth (10)	11.15 (81) – 12.7 (79)	Barry Cable	Barry Cable	Subiaco Oval	45,126
1979	East Fremantle (25)	South Fremantle (11)	21.19 (145) – 16.16 (112)	Brian Peake	Brad Smith	Subiaco Oval	52,781
West Australian Football League (1980–1989)
1980	South Fremantle (10)	Swan Districts (3)	23.18 (156) – 15.8 (98)	Noel Carter	Mal Brown	Subiaco Oval	46,208
1981	Claremont (5)	South Fremantle (12)	16.15 (111) – 12.24 (96)	Graham Moss	Graham Moss	Subiaco Oval	50,517
1982	Swan Districts (4)	Claremont (5)	18.19 (127) – 11.12 (78)	Graham Melrose	John Todd	Subiaco Oval	50,833
1983	Swan Districts (5)	Claremont (6)	15.14 (104) – 12.11 (83)	Keith Narkle	John Todd	Subiaco Oval	47,760
1984	Swan Districts (6)	East Fremantle (25)	20.18 (138) – 15.12 (102)	Keith Narkle	John Todd	Subiaco Oval	41,831
1985	East Fremantle (26)	Subiaco (7)	15.12 (102) – 14.13 (97)	Ron Alexander	Ron Alexander	Subiaco Oval	42,657
1986	Subiaco (6)	East Fremantle (26)	19.16 (130) – 8.13 (61)	Neil Taylor	Haydn Bunton, Jr.	Subiaco Oval	38,389
1987	Claremont (6)	Subiaco (8)	20.20 (140) – 10.9 (69)	Gerard Neesham	Gerard Neesham	Subiaco Oval	32,340
1988	Subiaco (7)	Claremont (7)	19.8 (122) – 8.12 (60)	Greg Carpenter	Haydn Bunton, Jr.	Subiaco Oval	28,183
1989	Claremont (7)	South Fremantle (13)	15.16 (109) – 5.9 (39)	John Scott	Gerard Neesham	Subiaco Oval	38,193
W.A. State League (1990)
1990	Swan Districts (7)	Claremont (8)	16.7 (103) – 10.17 (77)	Peter Hodyl	John Todd	Subiaco Oval	26,541
West Australian Football League (1991–1996)
1991	Claremont (8)	Subiaco (9)	19.18 (132) – 8.7 (55)	Mark Hann	Gerard Neesham	Subiaco Oval	22,731
1992	East Fremantle (27)	South Fremantle (14)	12.19 (91) – 9.13 (67)	Steve Malaxos	Ken Judge	Subiaco Oval	30,130
1993	Claremont (9)	West Perth (16)	13.14 (92) – 8.14 (62)	Darrell Panizza	Gerard Neesham	Subiaco Oval	32,404
1994	East Fremantle (28)	Claremont (9)	13.13 (91) – 10.10 (70)	Steve Malaxos	Ken Judge	Subiaco Oval	17,594
1995	West Perth (16)	Subiaco (10)	21.11 (137) – 12.9 (81)	Darren Harris	John Dimmer	Subiaco Oval	30,712
1996	Claremont (10)	East Perth (14)	13.8 (86) – 12.12 (84)	Jeremy Guard	Darrell Panizza	Subiaco Oval	29,771
Westar Rules (1997–2000)
1997	South Fremantle (11)	East Fremantle (27)	13.7 (85) – 11.13 (79)	Jon Dorotich & Peter Worsfold	John Todd	Subiaco Oval	32,371
1998	East Fremantle (29)	West Perth (17)	20.10 (130) – 13.9 (87)	Stephen Bilcich	Tony Micale	Subiaco Oval	23,258
1999	West Perth (17)	South Fremantle (15)	14.13 (97) – 11.6 (72)	Kim Rigoll	John Dimmer	Subiaco Oval	25,473
2000	East Perth (15)	East Fremantle (28)	18.11 (119) – 11.14 (80)	Jeremy Barnard	Tony Micale	Subiaco Oval	30,174
West Australian Football League (2001–Present)
2001	East Perth (16)	South Fremantle (16)	17.18 (120) – 5.8 (38)	Jeremy Barnard	Tony Micale	Subiaco Oval	23,842
2002	East Perth (17)	West Perth (18)	15.14 (104) – 5.14 (44)	Jeremy Barnard	Tony Micale	Subiaco Oval	31,382
2003	West Perth (18)	Subiaco (11)	13.9 (87) – 9.10 (64)	Steve Trewhella	Darren Harris	Subiaco Oval	17,750
2004	Subiaco (8)	Claremont (10)	15.9 (99) – 7.9 (51)	Richard Maloney	Peter German	Subiaco Oval	21,507
2005	South Fremantle (12)	Claremont (11)	17.8 (110) – 7.12 (54)	David Gault	John Dimmer	Subiaco Oval	22,570
2006	Subiaco (9)	South Fremantle (17)	24.9 (153) – 10.10 (70)	Marc Webb	Peter German	Subiaco Oval	21,291
2007	Subiaco (10)	Claremont (12)	15.13 (103) – 9.8 (62)	Marc Webb	Scott Watters	Subiaco Oval	19,541
2008	Subiaco (11)	Swan Districts (4)	22.16 (148) – 14.7 (91)	Marc Webb	Scott Watters	Subiaco Oval	23,199
2009	South Fremantle (13)	Subiaco (12)	17.11 (113) – 13.17 (95)	Toby McGrath	John Dimmer	Subiaco Oval	22,738
2010	Swan Districts (8)	Claremont (13)	14.16 (100) – 14.15 (99)	Josh Roberts	Brian Dawson	Subiaco Oval	24,638
2011	Claremont (11)	Subiaco (13)	19.13 (127) – 10.11 (71)	Clancy Rudeforth	Simon McPhee	Patersons Stadium	15,459
2012	Claremont (12)	East Fremantle (29)	18.16 (124) – 15.8 (98)	Luke Blackwell	Marc Webb	Patersons Stadium	18,612
2013	West Perth (19)	East Perth (15)	20.11 (131) – 12.10 (82)	Jason Salecic	Bill Monaghan	Patersons Stadium	20,008
2014	Subiaco (12)	East Perth (16)	11.16 (82) – 9.12 (66)	Kyal Horsley	Jarrad Schofield	Patersons Stadium	11,987
2015	Subiaco (13)	West Perth (19)	21.10 (136) - 10.10 (70)	Kyal Horsley	Jarrad Schofield	Domain Stadium	13,094
2016	Peel	Subiaco (14)	11.13 (79) – 8.8 (56)	Gerald Ugle	Cam Shepherd	Domain Stadium	15,031
2017	Peel (2)	Subiaco (15)	11.6 (72) – 7.14 (56)	Gerald Ugle	Cam Shepherd	Domain Stadium	18,180
2018	Subiaco (14)	West Perth (20)	19.13 (127) – 7.4 (46)	Kyal Horsley	Jarrad Schofield	Optus Stadium	25,064
2019	Subiaco (15)	South Fremantle (18)	18.12 (120) – 3.6 (24)	Leigh Kitchin	Beau Wardman	Optus Stadium	18,941
2020	South Fremantle (14)	Claremont (14)	6.10 (46) – 6.7 (43)	Dylan Main	Todd Curley	Fremantle Community Bank Oval	10,179
2021	Subiaco (16)	South Fremantle (19)	13.7 (85) – 5.11 (41)	Leigh Kitchin	Beau Wardman	Optus Stadium	29,879
2022	West Perth (20)	Claremont (15)	10.9 (69) – 8.9 (57)	Aaron Black	Darren Harris	Leederville Oval	16,791
2023	East Fremantle (30)	Peel	12.13 (85) – 6.10 (46)	Matthew Jupp	Bill Monaghan	Optus Stadium	27,104
2024	Peel (3)	East Perth (17)	14.8 (92) – 8.11 (59)	Ben Hancock	Adam Read	Optus Stadium	25,481
2025	South Fremantle (15)	East Perth (18)	8.8 (56) – 8.6 (54)	Chad Pearson	Craig White	Optus Stadium	23,752
2026	Peel (4)	Claremont (16)	16.17 (113) - 7.9 (51)	Jack Sears	Adam Read	Optus Stadium	19,210

== Records ==
=== Premierships ===
==== Current clubs ====
Club	Premierships		Runners-up	
Club	Total	Season(s)	Total	Season(s)
East Fremantle	30	1900, 1902, 1903, 1904, 1906, 1908, 1909, 1910, 1911, 1914, 1918, 1925, 1928, 1929, 1930, 1931, 1932, 1937, 1943, 1945, 1946, 1957, 1965, 1974, 1979, 1985, 1992, 1994, 1998, 2023	29	1899, 1901, 1905, 1907, 1912, 1916, 1917, 1919, 1920, 1921, 1923, 1924, 1934, 1938, 1939, 1941, 1944, 1954, 1955, 1958, 1962, 1963, 1964, 1977, 1984, 1986, 1997, 2000, 2012
West Perth	20	1897, 1899, 1901, 1905, 1932, 1934, 1935, 1941, 1942, 1949, 1951, 1960, 1969, 1971, 1975, 1995, 1999, 2003, 2013, 2022	20	1891, 1892, 1893, 1894, 1898, 1903, 1906, 1911, 1922, 1946, 1947, 1948, 1952, 1953, 1973, 1993, 1998, 2002, 2015, 2018
East Perth	17	1919, 1920, 1921, 1922, 1923, 1926, 1927, 1936, 1944, 1956, 1958, 1959, 1972, 1978, 2000, 2001, 2002	18	1910, 1918, 1928, 1932, 1957, 1960, 1961, 1966, 1967, 1968, 1969, 1971, 1976, 1996, 2013, 2014, 2024, 2025
Subiaco	16	1912, 1913, 1915, 1924, 1973, 1986, 1988, 2004, 2006, 2007, 2008, 2014, 2015, 2018, 2019, 2021	15	1925, 1926, 1931, 1933, 1935, 1959, 1985, 1987, 1991, 1995, 2003, 2009, 2011, 2016, 2017
South Fremantle	15	1916, 1917, 1947, 1948, 1950, 1952, 1953, 1954, 1970, 1980, 1997, 2005, 2009, 2020, 2025	19	1900, 1914, 1927, 1929, 1930, 1940, 1945, 1951, 1956, 1975, 1979, 1981, 1989, 1992, 1999, 2001, 2006, 2019, 2021
Claremont	12	1938, 1939, 1940, 1964, 1981, 1987, 1989, 1991, 1993, 1996, 2011, 2012	16	1936, 1937, 1942, 1972, 1982, 1983, 1988, 1990, 1994, 2004, 2005, 2007, 2010, 2020, 2022, 2026
Swan Districts	8	1961, 1962, 1963, 1982, 1983, 1984, 1990, 2010	4	1943, 1965, 1980, 2008
Perth	7	1907, 1955, 1966, 1967, 1968, 1976, 1977	10	1904, 1908, 1909, 1913, 1915, 1949, 1950, 1970, 1974, 1978
Peel Thunder	4	2016, 2017, 2024, 2026	1	2023
West Coast	0	-	0	-

==== Defunct Clubs ====
Club	Premierships		Runners-up	
Club	Total	Season(s)	Total	Season(s)
Unions/Fremantle (II)	10	1887, 1888, 1889, 1890, 1892, 1893, 1894, 1895, 1896, 1898	0	-
Rovers	2	1885, 1891	3	1888, 1889, 1895
Fremantle (I)	1	1886	0	-
Victorians	0	-	3	1885, 1886, 1887
Imperials	0	-	2	1896, 1897
Metropolitan	0	-	1	1890
North Fremantle	0	-	1	1902
Midland Junction	0	-	0	-
Centrals	0	-	0	-
East Perth (I)	0	-	0	-
High School	0	-	0	-
West Australian	0	-	0	-

=== Consecutive appearances ===
==== Consecutive Premierships ====
Premierships	Club	Sequence
5	Fremantle (II)	1892, 1893, 1894, 1895, 1896
5	East Perth	1919, 1920, 1921, 1922, 1923
4	Unions/Fremantle (II)	1887, 1888, 1889, 1890
4	East Fremantle	1908, 1909, 1910, 1911
4	East Fremantle	1928, 1929, 1930, 1931
3	East Fremantle	1902, 1903, 1904
3	Claremont	1938, 1939, 1940
3	South Fremantle	1952, 1953, 1954
3	Swan Districts	1961, 1962, 1963
3	Perth	1966, 1967, 1968
3	Swan Districts	1982, 1983, 1984
3	East Perth	2000, 2001, 2002
3	Subiaco	2006, 2007, 2008
2	Subiaco	1912, 1913
2	South Fremantle	1916, 1917
2	East Perth	1926, 1927
2	West Perth	1934, 1935
2	West Perth	1941, 1942
2	East Fremantle	1945, 1946
2	South Fremantle	1947, 1948
2	East Perth	1958, 1959
2	Perth	1976, 1977
2	Claremont	2011, 2012
2	Subiaco	2014, 2015
2	Peel	2016, 2017
2	Subiaco	2018, 2019

==== Consecutive Grand Finals ====
Prior to 1904, the premiership and runners-up of the season were decided by position on the ladder (1st and 2nd, respectively). From 1904 onwards, a grand final was played to determine the premiers of that year. Since no grand final was played prior to 1904, despite East Fremantle either winning a premiership or being determined as the runners-up in the years of 1899-1903 (L, W, L, W, W), these years are not counted additionally towards East Fremantle's consecutive grand final appearances from 1904-1912.

#	Club	Years	Win/Loss
9	East Fremantle	1904, 1905^{1}, 1906, 1907, 1908, 1909, 1910, 1911, 1912	W, L, W, L, W, W, W, W, L
6	East Fremantle	1916, 1917, 1918, 1919, 1920, 1921	L, L, W, L, L, L
6	East Perth	1918, 1919, 1920, 1921, 1922, 1923	L, W, W, W, W, W
6	East Perth	1956, 1957, 1958, 1959, 1960, 1961	W, L, W, W, L, L
6	Subiaco	2014, 2015, 2016, 2017, 2018, 2019	W, W, L, L, W, W
5	Claremont	1936, 1937, 1938^{2}, 1939, 1940	L, L, W, W, W
5	South Fremantle	1950, 1951, 1952, 1953, 1954	W, L, W, W, W
5	Claremont	1987, 1988, 1989, 1990, 1991	W, L, W, L, W
4	East Fremantle	1928, 1929, 1930, 1931	W, W, W, W
4	East Fremantle	1943, 1944, 1945, 1946	W, L, W, W
4	West Perth	1946, 1947, 1948, 1949	L, L, L, W
4	East Fremantle	1962, 1963, 1964, 1965	L, L, L, W
4	East Perth	1966, 1967, 1968, 1969	L, L, L, L
4	Subiaco	1985, 1986, 1987, 1988	L, W, L, W
4	Subiaco	2006, 2007, 2008, 2009	W, W, W, L
3	Perth	1907, 1908, 1909	W, L, L
3	East Fremantle	1923, 1924, 1925	L, L, W
3	Subiaco	1924, 1925, 1926	W, L, L
3	East Perth	1926, 1927, 1928	W, W, L
3	East Fremantle	1937, 1938, 1939	W, L, L
3	West Perth	1951, 1952, 1953	W, L, L
3	Swan Districts	1961, 1962, 1963	W, W, W
3	Perth	1966, 1967, 1968	W, W, W
3	Perth	1976, 1977, 1978	W, W, L
3	South Fremantle	1979, 1980, 1981	L, W, L
3	Claremont	1981, 1982, 1983	W, L, L
3	Swan Districts	1982, 1983, 1984	W, W, W
3	East Perth	2000, 2001, 2002	W, W, W
3	Claremont	2010, 2011, 2012	L, W, W
3	South Fremantle	2019, 2020, 2021	L, W, L

^{1} East Fremantle drew the 1905 WAFA Grand Final and was defeated by West Perth in the replay.
^{2} Claremont drew the 1938 WANFL Grand Final, and defeated East Fremantle in the replay.

=== Grand Final Matchups ===
Grand finals commenced from 1904, onwards. Grand final replays are not counted as individual appearances. This table is a list of all the grand final matchups in the West Australian Football League by order of how often two teams have played against each other. The table denotes the number of grand final appearances between two teams, the year(s) both teams have played against each other, and the premiership years(s) of each team (if any at all).

#	Matchup	Grand Final Appearances	Team(s) Premiership Years	
			Team(s)	Premiership Years
11	East Fremantle vs East Perth	1910, 1918, 1919, 1920, 1921, 1923, 1928, 1944, 1957, 1958, 2000	East Fremantle	1910, 1918, 1928, 1957
11	East Fremantle vs East Perth	1910, 1918, 1919, 1920, 1921, 1923, 1928, 1944, 1957, 1958, 2000	East Perth	1919, 1920, 1921, 1923, 1944, 1958, 2000
10	South Fremantle vs East Fremantle	1914, 1916, 1917, 1929, 1930, 1945, 1954, 1979, 1992, 1997	South Fremantle	1916, 1917, 1954, 1997
10	South Fremantle vs East Fremantle	1914, 1916, 1917, 1929, 1930, 1945, 1954, 1979, 1992, 1997	East Fremantle	1914, 1929, 1930, 1945, 1979, 1992
7	Perth vs East Fremantle	1904, 1907, 1908, 1909, 1955, 1974, 1977	Perth	1907, 1955, 1977
7	Perth vs East Fremantle	1904, 1907, 1908, 1909, 1955, 1974, 1977	East Fremantle	1904, 1908, 1909, 1974
7	Subiaco vs East Fremantle	1912, 1924, 1925, 1931, 1933, 1985, 1986	Subiaco	1912, 1924, 1986
7	Subiaco vs East Fremantle	1912, 1924, 1925, 1931, 1933, 1985, 1986	East Fremantle	1925, 1931, 1933, 1985
7	East Fremantle vs West Perth	1905, 1906, 1911, 1934, 1941, 1946, 1998	East Fremantle	1906, 1911, 1946
7	East Fremantle vs West Perth	1905, 1906, 1911, 1934, 1941, 1946, 1998	West Perth	1905 **(Replay)**, 1934, 1941, 1998
7	East Fremantle vs West Perth	1905, 1906, 1911, 1934, 1941, 1946, 1998	Draw	1905
7	South Fremantle vs West Perth	1947, 1948, 1951, 1952, 1953, 1975, 1999	South Fremantle	1946, 1947, 1952, 1953
7	South Fremantle vs West Perth	1947, 1948, 1951, 1952, 1953, 1975, 1999	West Perth	1951, 1975, 1999
7	East Perth vs West Perth	1922, 1932, 1960, 1969, 1971, 2002, 2013	East Perth	1922, 2002
7	East Perth vs West Perth	1922, 1932, 1960, 1969, 1971, 2002, 2013	West Perth	1932, 1960, 1969, 1971, 2013
6	Claremont vs Subiaco	1987, 1988, 1991, 2004, 2007, 2011	Claremont	1987, 1991, 2011
6	Claremont vs Subiaco	1987, 1988, 1991, 2004, 2007, 2011	Subiaco	1988, 2004, 2007
6	East Fremantle vs Claremont	1937, 1938, 1939, 1964, 1994, 2012	East Fremantle	1937, 1994
6	East Fremantle vs Claremont	1937, 1938, 1939, 1964, 1994, 2012	Claremont	1938 **(Replay)**, 1939, 1964, 2012
6	East Fremantle vs Claremont	1937, 1938, 1939, 1964, 1994, 2012	Draw	1938
6	West Perth vs Subiaco	1935, 1973, 1995, 2003, 2015, 2018	West Perth	1935, 1995, 2003
6	West Perth vs Subiaco	1935, 1973, 1995, 2003, 2015, 2018	Subiaco	1973, 2015, 2018
5	Perth vs East Perth	1966, 1967, 1968, 1976, 1978	Perth	1966, 1967, 1968, 1976
5	Perth vs East Perth	1966, 1967, 1968, 1976, 1978	East Perth	1978
5	Swan Districts vs East Fremantle	1943, 1962, 1963, 1965, 1984	Swan Districts	1962, 1963, 1984
5	Swan Districts vs East Fremantle	1943, 1962, 1963, 1965, 1984	East Fremantle	1943, 1965
5	Claremont vs South Fremantle	1940, 1981, 1989, 2005, 2020	Claremont	1940, 1981, 1989
5	Claremont vs South Fremantle	1940, 1981, 1989, 2005, 2020	South Fremantle	2005, 2020
4	Claremont vs Swan Districts	1982, 1983, 1990, 2010	Claremont	-
4	Claremont vs Swan Districts	1982, 1983, 1990, 2010	Swan Districts	1982, 1983, 1990, 2010
4	Subiaco vs South Fremantle	2006, 2009, 2019, 2021	Subiaco	2006, 2019, 2021
4	Subiaco vs South Fremantle	2006, 2009, 2019, 2021	South Fremantle	2009
4	South Fremantle vs East Perth	1927, 1956, 2001, 2025	South Fremantle	2025
4	South Fremantle vs East Perth	1927, 1956, 2001, 2025	East Perth	1927, 1956, 2001
3	East Perth vs Claremont	1936, 1972, 1996	East Perth	1936, 1972
3	East Perth vs Claremont	1936, 1972, 1996	Claremont	1996
3	Subiaco vs East Perth	1926, 1959, 2014	Subiaco	2014
3	Subiaco vs East Perth	1926, 1959, 2014	East Perth	1926, 1959
3	West Perth vs Claremont	1942, 1993, 2022	West Perth	1942, 2022
3	West Perth vs Claremont	1942, 1993, 2022	Claremont	1993
2	Perth vs Subiaco	1913, 1915	Perth	-
2	Perth vs Subiaco	1913, 1915	Subiaco	1913, 1915
2	South Fremantle vs Perth	1950, 1970	South Fremantle	1950, 1970
2	South Fremantle vs Perth	1950, 1970	Perth	-
2	Peel Thunder vs Subiaco	2016, 2017	Peel Thunder	2016, 2017
2	Peel Thunder vs Subiaco	2016, 2017	Subiaco	-
1	West Perth vs Perth	1949	West Perth	1949
1	West Perth vs Perth	1949	Perth	-
1	East Perth vs Swan Districts	1961	East Perth	-
1	East Perth vs Swan Districts	1961	Swan Districts	1961
1	Swan Districts vs South Fremantle	1980	Swan Districts	-
1	Swan Districts vs South Fremantle	1980	South Fremantle	1980
1	Subiaco vs Swan Districts	2008	Subiaco	2008
1	Subiaco vs Swan Districts	2008	Swan Districts	-
1	East Fremantle vs Peel Thunder	2023	East Fremantle	2023
1	East Fremantle vs Peel Thunder	2023	Peel Thunder	-
1	Peel Thunder vs East Perth	2024	Peel Thunder	2024
1	Peel Thunder vs East Perth	2024	East Perth	-
1	Peel Thunder vs Claremont	2026	Peel Thunder	2026
1	Peel Thunder vs Claremont	2026	Claremont	-

=== Premiership Droughts ===
^{+}	Drought began upon club's entry to league
^{†}	Drought ended upon club's exit from league
*	Also the longest club premiership drought
°	Club has not yet won a premiership
^{×}	Club exited the league without winning a premiership

The following tables summarise the different premiership droughts for each club. The first table is limited to droughts lasting twenty or more seasons, while the other three are specific to each club (two of which span the entire competition, including all 21 teams). The duration of the drought is given as the number of full seasons contested between premierships; the season in which the drought is broken is considered to be part of the drought, and if the drought began from a club's entry to the league, the club's inaugural season is also considered to be part of the drought. Grand final replays are not included in grand final appearances.

The East Perth Football Club (Royals) currently playing in the WAFL since 1906, are only referred to as East Perth (II) when appearing on the same table along with the original East Perth Football Club (1891 - 1892), to avoid any confusion with the lesser known club (East Perth (I)).

==== Longest Premiership Droughts ====
Club	Seasons	Start	End	Runners-up during drought
Subiaco	49	1924	1973	1925, 1926, 1931, 1933, 1935, 1959
Perth	49	1977	—	1978
Perth	48	1907	1955	1908, 1909, 1913, 1915, 1949, 1950
South Fremantle	30	1917	1947	1927, 1929, 1930, 1940, 1945
Swan Districts	28	1934^{+}	1961	1943
West Perth	27	1905	1932	1906, 1911, 1922
East Fremantle	25	1998	2023	2000, 2012
Claremont	24	1940	1964	1942
East Perth	24	2002	—	2013, 2014, 2024, 2025
East Perth	22	1978	2000	1996
Swan Districts	20	1990	2010	2008
Peel	20	1997^{+}	2016	—

Table correct to the end of the 2026 season.

==== Longest club premiership droughts ====
Club	Seasons	Start	End	Runners-up during drought
Centrals	1	1891^{+}	1891 ^{†}	—
**Claremont**	24	1940	1964	1942
**East Fremantle**	25	1998	2023	2000, 2012
East Perth (I)	2	1891^{+}	1892 ^{†}	—
**East Perth (II)**	24	2002	-	2013, 2014, 2024, 2025
Fremantle (I)	2	1885^{+}	1886	—
High School	1 (Note: High School withdrew from the competition after only two rounds into the 1885 season.)	1885^{+}	1885 ^{†}	—
Imperials	3	1895^{+}	1897 ^{†}	1896, 1897
Metropolitan	2	1889^{+}	1890^{†}	1890
Midland Junction	10 (Note: As Midland Junction did not contest the 1911-1913 seasons, the duration of this drought was 10 contested seasons (across 13 calendar years).)	1905^{+}	1917 ^{†}	—
North Fremantle	15	1901^{+}	1915 ^{†}	1902
**Peel**	20	1997^{+}	2016	—
**Perth**	49	1977	-	1978
Rovers	8	1891	1899 ^{†}	1895
**South Fremantle**	30	1917	1947	1927, 1929, 1930, 1940, 1945
**Subiaco**	49	1924	1973	1925, 1926, 1931, 1933, 1935, 1959
**Swan Districts**	28	1934^{+}	1961	1943
Unions/Fremantle (II)	2	1890	1892	—
Unions/Fremantle (II)	2	1896	1898	—
Victorians	4	1885^{+}	1888 ^{†}	1885, 1886, 1887
West Australian	2	1887^{+}	1888 ^{†}	—
**West Coast (R)**	7° (Note: West Coast did not contend the 2020 season, due to restrictions put in place during the COVID-19 pandemic.)	2019^{+}	—	—
**West Perth**	27	1905	1932	1906, 1911, 1922

Bold indicates clubs currently playing in the WAFL.

Table correct to the end of the 2026 season.

==== Current club premiership droughts ====
Club	Seasons	Start	Runners-up during drought
Claremont	14	2012	2020, 2022, 2026
East Fremantle	3	2023	—
East Perth	24*	2002	2013, 2014, 2024, 2025
Peel	0	2026	—
Perth	49*	1977	1978
South Fremantle	1	2025	—
Subiaco	5	2021	—
Swan Districts	16	2010	—
West Coast (R)	7*	2019^{+}	—
West Perth	4	2022	—

Table correct to the end of the 2026 season.

==== Time taken to win first premiership ====
Club	Seasons	Entry to league	First premiership	Runners-up during drought
Centrals	1^{×}	1891	—	—
**Claremont**	13	1926	1938	1936, 1937
**East Fremantle**	3	1898	1900	1899
East Perth (I)	2^{×}	1891	—	—
**East Perth (II)**	14	1906	1919	1910, 1918
Fremantle (I)	2	1885	1886	—
High School	1^{×}	1885	—	—
Imperials	3^{×}	1895	—	1896, 1897
Metropolitan	2^{×}	1889	—	1890
Midland Junction	10^{×}	1905	—	—
North Fremantle	15^{×}	1901	—	1902
**Peel**	20	1997	2016	—
**Perth**	9	1899	1907	1904
Rovers	1	1885	1885	—
**South Fremantle**	17	1900	1916	1900, 1914
**Subiaco**	12	1901	1912	—
**Swan Districts**	28	1934	1961	1943
Unions/Fremantle (II)	2	1886	1887	—
Victorians	4^{×}	1885	—	1885, 1886, 1887
West Australian	2^{×}	1887	—	—
**West Coast (R)**	7°	2019	—	—
**West Perth**	7	1891	1897	1891, 1892, 1893, 1894

Bold indicates clubs currently playing in the WAFL.

Table correct to the end of the 2026 season.

=== Game records ===
Highest score	26.13 (169)	by Perth (v East Fremantle, 1977)
Lowest score	0.8 (8)	by Perth (v East Fremantle, 1908)
Highest aggregate	265 points	Perth v East Fremantle (1977)
Lowest aggregate	40 points	Subiaco v Perth (1915)
Highest winning margin	96 points	by Subiaco (v South Fremantle, 2019)
Lowest winning margin	1 point	by Perth (v East Fremantle, 1907) by Swan Districts (v Claremont, 2010)
Highest losing score	16.16 (112)	by South Fremantle (v East Fremantle, 1979)
Lowest winning score	3.3 (21)	by Subiaco (v Perth, 1915)
Highest attendance	52,781	East Fremantle v South Fremantle (1979)
Lowest attendance	5,308	West Perth v Claremont (1942)
Premiership from lowest ladder position	4th	by East Perth (v Claremont, 1936) by Swan Districts (v East Fremantle, 1963) by Claremont (v East Fremantle, 1964) by East Fremantle v Swan Districts, 1965) by Peel Thunder (v Subiaco, 2016)

Table correct to the end of the 2026 season.

== Minor grades ==
=== Reserves premierships ===
- 1925: Perth (1)
- 1926: East Fremantle (1)
- 1927: West Perth (1)
- 1928: Subiaco (1)
- 1929: Subiaco (2)
- 1930: West Perth (2)
- 1931: Subiaco (3)
- 1932: East Perth (1)
- 1933: East Perth (2)
- 1934: East Perth (3)
- 1935: East Perth (4)
- 1936: South Fremantle (1)
- 1937: Claremont (1)
- 1938: East Fremantle (2)
- 1939: East Fremantle (3)
- 1940: East Fremantle (4)
- 1941-45: not awarded (WW2)
- 1946: Swan Districts (1)
- 1947: West Perth (3)
- 1948: East Perth (5)
- 1949: Perth (2)
- 1950: East Fremantle (5)
- 1951: East Fremantle (6)
- 1952: South Fremantle (2)
- 1953: South Fremantle (3)
- 1954: South Fremantle (4)
- 1955: Perth (3)
- 1956: West Perth (4)
- 1957: Perth (4)
- 1958: Subiaco (4)
- 1959: Subiaco (5)
- 1960: West Perth (5)
- 1961: East Perth (6)
- 1962: East Fremantle (7)
- 1963: Perth (5)
- 1964: Swan Districts (2)
- 1965: East Perth (7)
- 1966: East Perth (8)
- 1967: East Perth (9)
- 1968: Perth (6)
- 1969: Subiaco (6)
- 1970: East Fremantle (8)
- 1971: Perth (7)
- 1972: Subiaco (7)
- 1973: Perth (8)
- 1974: Perth (9)
- 1975: Perth (10)
- 1976: East Perth (10)
- 1977: Claremont (2)
- 1978: East Perth (11)
- 1979: Swan Districts (3)
- 1980: Claremont (3)
- 1981: East Perth (12)
- 1982: Claremont (4)
- 1983: East Perth (13)
- 1984: Subiaco (8)
- 1985: South Fremantle (5)
- 1986: South Fremantle (6)
- 1987: Claremont (5)
- 1988: Perth (11)
- 1989: East Fremantle (9)
- 1990: Claremont (6)
- 1991: South Fremantle (7)
- 1992: South Fremantle (8)
- 1993: East Fremantle (10)
- 1994: East Fremantle (11)
- 1995: Subiaco (9)
- 1996: Perth (12)
- 1997: Subiaco (10)
- 1998: Subiaco (11)
- 1999: Subiaco (12)
- 2000: Claremont (7)
- 2001: East Fremantle (12)
- 2002: Subiaco (13)
- 2003: Subiaco (14)
- 2004: South Fremantle (9)
- 2005: Subiaco (15)
- 2006: Swan Districts (4)
- 2007: Subiaco (16)
- 2008: East Fremantle (13)
- 2009: South Fremantle (10)
- 2010: Claremont (8)
- 2011: Claremont (9)
- 2012: Claremont (10)
- 2013: South Fremantle (11)
- 2014: West Perth (6)
- 2015: South Fremantle (12)
- 2016: Claremont (11)
- 2017: Subiaco (17)
- 2018: Subiaco (18)
- 2019: West Perth (7)
- 2020: East Perth (14)
- 2021: Perth (13)
- 2022: Subiaco (19)
- 2023: Swan Districts (5)
- 2024: East Fremantle (14)
- 2025: East Perth (15)
- 2026: Swan Districts (6)

Source where unlisted

=== Colts (under-19) premierships ===
- 1957: Swan Districts (1)
- 1958: Swan Districts (2)
- 1959: Perth (1)
- 1960: Perth (2)
- 1961: Perth (3)
- 1962: East Fremantle (1)
- 1963: Perth (4)
- 1964: Perth (5)
- 1965: Perth (6)
- 1966: East Fremantle (2)
- 1967: East Perth (1)
- 1968: West Perth (1)
- 1969: East Fremantle (3)
- 1970: South Fremantle (1)
- 1971: Swan Districts (3)
- 1972: Perth (7)
- 1973: East Fremantle (4)
- 1974: Subiaco (1)
- 1975: East Perth (2)
- 1976: Claremont (1)
- 1977: Claremont (2)
- 1978: Claremont (3)
- 1979: Claremont (4)
- 1980: East Perth (3)
- 1981: East Fremantle (5)
- 1982: South Fremantle (2)
- 1983: South Fremantle (3)
- 1984: South Fremantle (4)
- 1985: South Fremantle (5)
- 1986: Claremont (5)
- 1987: East Fremantle (6)
- 1988: Claremont (6)
- 1989: Subiaco (2)
- 1990: West Perth (2)
- 1991: Swan Districts (4)
- 1992: East Fremantle (7)
- 1993: Claremont (7)
- 1994: Claremont (8)
- 1995: Claremont (9)
- 1996: Claremont (10)
- 1997: Claremont (11)
- 1998: East Fremantle (8)
- 1999: Perth (8)
- 2000: East Perth (4)
- 2001: East Fremantle (9)
- 2002: South Fremantle (6)
- 2003: South Fremantle (7)
- 2004: Peel Thunder (1)
- 2005: Peel Thunder (2)
- 2006: East Perth (5)
- 2007: Swan Districts (5)
- 2008: Swan Districts (6)
- 2009: Claremont (12)
- 2010: East Fremantle (10)
- 2011: South Fremantle (8)
- 2012: South Fremantle (9)
- 2013: Claremont (13)
- 2014: Swan Districts (7)
- 2015: Claremont (14)
- 2016: Claremont (15)
- 2017: East Fremantle (11)
- 2018: Subiaco (3)
- 2019: Claremont (16)
- 2020: Subiaco (4)
- 2021: Swan Districts (8)
- 2022: Peel Thunder (3)
- 2023: Claremont (17)
- 2024: Claremont (18)
- 2025: Claremont (19)
- 2026: East Fremantle (12)

=== Fourths premierships (1965–1974) ===
- 1965: East Perth (1)
- 1966: Claremont (1)
- 1967: East Perth (2)
- 1968: Claremont (2)
- 1969: Swan Districts (1)
- 1970: Subiaco (1)
- 1971: Swan Districts (2)
- 1972: East Fremantle (1)
- 1973: Swan Districts (3)
- 1974: East Fremantle (2)

== See also ==
- List of WAFL Women's premiers
