= George Prince (footballer) =

Australian rules footballer

Personal information
- Full name: George James Prince
- Born: 21 May 1918; East Fremantle, Western Australia
- Died: 3 September 2002 (aged 84); Ravenswood, Western Australia
- Original team: Palmyra Juniors
- Height: 178 cm (5 ft 10 in)
- Position: Utility

Playing career
Years	Club	Games (Goals)
1939–1952	East Fremantle	234 (425)

Representative team honours
Years	Team	Games (Goals)
1946–1949	Western Australia	6 (8)

Career highlights
- WAFL leading goalkicker: 1949; East Fremantle premiership team: 1945, 1946; East Fremantle leading goalkicker: 1947, 1949 ,1950; East Fremantle best and fairest: 1947; East Fremantle life member: 1952; East Fremantle Team of the Century: 1997; West Australian Football Hall of Fame: 2011

George James Prince (21 May 1918 – 3 September 2002) was an Australian rules footballer who played for the East Fremantle Football Club in the Western Australian National Football League (WANFL) between 1939 and 1952. He was the leading goalkicker in the league for the 1949 season, and won premierships in 1945 and 1946.

== Biography ==
Prince was born in East Fremantle and began his career with the nearby Palmyra Juniors. He made his senior debut for Old Easts in round three of the 1939 season, starting out as a back pocket. He was switched to a forward pocket the following week and kicked six goals. Prince stood 178 cm (5 foot 10), a little taller than the average footballer of his age, and was versatile enough to play in virtually every position on the ground, which he did at some point in his career. Prince missed three seasons (1942, 1943, 1944) due to the war, but played in a premiership in his first full season back (1945 WANFL season). He added a second premiership medal the following year, kicking five goals in the grand final despite breaking three ribs in the preceding game. This uncapped a rare undefeated season for East Fremantle.

40 goals from 19 games was enough to make Prince East Fremantle's leading goalkicker in 1947. Increasingly being stationed at centre half-forward or full-forward, he kicked 87 goals from 19 games in 1949 to become the league leading goalkicker, taking over from the legendary George Doig as the club's best forward. Prince bettered himself with 90 goals in 1950, but was eclipsed by Perth's Ron Tucker for the overall gong with 115 goals. In both of those seasons, Prince kicked 10 goals in home games against Swan Districts at Fremantle Oval.

Prince spent his last two seasons (1951 and 1952) at full-back, covering a team weak spot. His last 158 games between July 1945 and September 1952 were played consecutively, a club record. At state level, Prince made his debut for Western Australia in 1946, and kicked eight goals from six total games (including three games at the 1947 Australian National Carnival). He kicked two goals against Victoria from a forward pocket to help his team to a rare four-point victory; however, a WA loss to South Australia and a Victorian flogging of the same team meant that Victoria still went on to win the carnival.

Prince became a successful businessman after retiring from football, becoming a director of a large shipping company. He painted his 26-vessel fleet in the club colours of blue and white. Prince was made an East Fremantle life member in 1952, and in 1997 was named at centre-half-forward in the East Fremantle Team of the Century. He was posthumously inducted in to the West Australian Football Hall of Fame in 2011.
