= 1891 WAFA season =

- Premiers: Rovers; 2nd premiership

The 1891 WAFA season was the 7th season of senior Australian rules football in Perth, Western Australia. The Rovers won their second and last premiership before the club dissolved. Prior to the start of the season, the Metropolitan Football Club dissolved to form the West Perth football club. This season also marks the season where the Centrals Football Club and first East Perth Football Club (unrelated to the currently active East Perth Football Club) joined the competition.

== Ladder ==
1891 ladder
| Pos | Team | Pld | W | L | D | GF | GA | GD | Pts |
|---|---|---|---|---|---|---|---|---|---|
| 1 | Rovers (P) | 12 | 9 | 2 | 1 | 37 | 20 | +17 | 19 |
| 2 | West Perth | 12 | 8 | 3 | 1 | 50 | 25 | +25 | 17 |
| 3 | Fremantle | 12 | 7 | 4 | 1 | 32 | 7 | +25 | 15 |
| 4 | Centrals | 12 | 2 | 9 | 1 | 17 | 52 | −35 | 5 |
| 5 | East Perth | 12 | 1 | 9 | 2 | 8 | 40 | −32 | 4 |

Source: WAFL Footy Facts
Rules for classification: 1) points; 2) percentage; 3) number of points for.
(P) Premiers
