= 1897 WAFA season =

Western Australian football season

- Teams: 4
- Premiers: West Perth; 1st premiership
- Minor premiers: West Perth; 1st minor premiership
- Leading goalkicker: Albert Thurgood (Fremantle) (27)

The 1897 WAFA season was the 13th season of senior Australian rules football in Perth, Western Australia. West Perth won the premiership, their first, after remaining undefeated throughout the season. The Rovers team finished last and failed to field a team for the final rounds of the season, forfeiting several matches to their opponents. 1897 was also the final season that Imperials competed, when at the end of the season it was discovered that “many of the bills were unpaid and that creditors were clamorous”.

== Clubs ==
Colours	Club	Captain	Leading goalkicker
	Fremantle	John Leckie	Albert Thurgood (27)
	Imperials	Tom Keenan	Kelly (15)
	Rovers	Robertson	Borland (11)
	West Perth	Barney Grecian	Dave De Coit (21)

== Home-and-away season ==
In 1897, the WAFA competition consisted of four teams of 20 on-the-field players each with only two venues, the WACA Ground and Fremantle Oval being used to host matches. This season also saw the introduction of the rule stipulating that a mark could only be made at the distance of ten yards or more, leading to a more open game.

When reporting match scores in 1897, the number of goals and behinds scored by each team is given; however, only the number of goals scored is considered when determining the result of a match. This was the final WAFA season before the introduction of the modern system of scoring, in which six points is awarded for a goal and one point is awarded for a behind.

=== Round 1 ===
	Round 1
Saturday, 15 May 1897	Fremantle 1.1	def. by	West Perth 5.10	Fremantle Oval (crowd: 1,800)
Saturday, 15 May 1897	Rovers 2.6	def. by	Imperials 6.4	WACA
Key players Sicily and O’Dea switched from Fremantle to Imperials during the season break and a relatively weak Fremantle team failed to score in the first half; The Inquirer and Commercial News report gives West Perth’s final score as 5.11 rather than 5.10

=== Round 2 ===
	Round 2
Saturday, 22 May 1897	Fremantle 3.13	def. by	Rovers 6.6	Fremantle Oval (crowd: 2,000)
Owing to the W.A.C.A. ground being required for the first day of the W.A. Cycling Club sports meeting, no football match was arranged by the committee of the W.A.F.A. to take place upon that ground; Play started 40 minute late, leading to the Western Australian Football Association introducing a new rule to enforce more timely commencement of games

=== Round 3 ===
	Round 3
Saturday, 29 May 1897	West Perth 3.9	drew with	Rovers 3.2	WACA
Saturday, 29 May 1897	Imperials 6.7	def.	Fremantle 3.3	Fremantle Oval (crowd: 2,000)
West Perth came from three goals to one down in the last quarter to draw a game where they had the majority of the scoring opportunities; Fremantle lost their third straight game

=== Round 4 ===
	Round 4
Saturday, 5 Jun 1897	West Perth 6.8	drew with	Fremantle 6.7	WACA
Saturday, 5 Jun 1897	Imperials 7.8	def.	Rovers 4.8	Fremantle Oval (crowd: 2,000)
Imperials won their third straight game to take an early lead on the ladder while West Perth drew their second successive game; A successful shot from a West Perth player right on the final bell was disallowed as the umpire heard that time had been called just prior to the ball being kicked; The Inquirer and Commercial News gives the final West Perth score as 6.9

=== Round 5 ===
	Round 5
Saturday, 12 Jun 1897	Imperials 3.6	drew with	West Perth 3.8	Fremantle Oval (crowd: 2,800)
The fixture that was unable to be played as part of Round 2 on 22 May was scheduled for this weekend; West Perth drew their third successive game when Williams scored an equalising goal for them with only two seconds left to play

=== Representative Game ===
	Representative Game
Saturday, 19 Jun 1897	Perth Representative Team 7.15	def.	Fremantle Representative Team 4.5	WACA
A poor turnout led to the match starting with Perth represented by 18 and Fremantle by 15 players respectively

=== Round 6 ===
	Round 6
Saturday, 26 Jun 1897	Fremantle 1.3	def.	Imperials 0.4	Fremantle Oval
Saturday, 26 Jun 1897	Rovers n/a	v	West Perth n/a	WACA
Fremantle won their first game of the season, Clarke scoring the only goal of the game with a kick off the ground in the second quarter; The game between Rovers and West Perth was called off when the heavy showers of rain which fell on Saturday morning left the Association Ground in an unfit state for play. West Perth wanted to play and raised a formal complaint with the association about the decision not to play.

=== Round 7 ===
	Round 7
Saturday, 3 Jul 1897	West Perth 8.15	def.	Imperials 2.0	WACA
Saturday, 3 Jul 1897	Fremantle 10.13	def.	Rovers 4.2	Fremantle Oval
West Perth comprehensively defeated Imperials to draw level with them at the top of the ladder; Umpire Orr, who was appointed to the West Perth-Imperials game, mistakenly travelled to Fremantle. Duff acted as umpire in his place for the first half, until Orr returned from Fremantle; Fremantle won their second straight game with a season high ten goals, Albert Thurgood scoring four goals in a best on ground display

=== Round 8 ===
	Round 8
Saturday, 10 Jul 1897	Rovers 4.5	def. by	Imperials 8.9	WACA
Saturday, 10 Jul 1897	Fremantle 7.12	drew with	West Perth 7.6	Fremantle Oval (crowd: 3,000)
Despite starting the game with only 14 men, Imperials comfortably accounted for Rovers, Wilson scoring four goals; There was a very high attendance of 3,000 people present at the Fremantle v West Perth match; Fremantle scored six goals in an impressive third quarter but ended up drawing with West Perth, Thurgood again scoring four goals

=== Round 9 ===
	Round 9
Saturday, 17 Jul 1897	West Perth n/a	v	Rovers n/a	WACA
Saturday, 17 Jul 1897	Fremantle n/a	v	Imperials n/a	Fremantle Oval
Neither of the games scheduled for 17 July was played on that date, with matches rescheduled for 4 September; The game between Rovers and West Perth was postponed when rain left the Association Ground in an unfit state for play; The game between Fremantle and Imperials was postponed due to the funeral of Mr. Walter Bell, prominent Fremantle citizen and ex-secretary of the Fremantle Football Club

=== Round 10 ===
	Round 10
Saturday, 24 Jul 1897	Rovers 5.3	def. by	Fremantle 7.15	WACA
Saturday, 24 Jul 1897	Imperials 7.11	def. by	West Perth 8.5	Fremantle Oval
West Perth defeated Imperials by a single goal to take the lead in the premiership, with Kelly scoring four goals for the losing team

=== Round 11 ===
	Round 11
Saturday, 31 Jul 1897	West Perth 8.6	def.	Fremantle 6.4	WACA
Saturday, 31 Jul 1897	Imperials	def.	Rovers	Fremantle Oval
Reports of the West Perth v Fremantle match record that a record crowd for the season witnessed an excellent game where “the brilliancy, the persistency, the coolness and the cleverness of the players surpassed all expectations”; Albert Thurgood kicked all six goals for Fremantle but ended up on the losing side; The Inquirer and Commercial News gave the final score as 8.7 to 6.5; Rovers failed to field a team in Fremantle, Imperials being awarded the game on a walkover

=== Round 12 ===
	Round 12
Saturday, 7 Aug 1897	Rovers 2.8	def. by	West Perth 10.13	WACA
Saturday, 7 Aug 1897	Fremantle 4.10	drew with	Imperials 4.4	Fremantle Oval
In what proved to be Rovers last appearance for the season, West Perth scored a season high 10 goals in an easy victory with Teddy Lockwood scoring three goals; The umpire of the Rovers v West Perth game, C. M. Scott, fell ill during the game and had to be replaced at half-time by his namesake, H. J. Scott; At Fremantle Oval, Fremantle had ten scoring shots (3.7) before Imperials registered their first score only to fall behind by four goals to three before equalising in the final term

=== Round 13 ===
	Round 13
Saturday, 14 Aug 1897	West Perth 8.9	def. by	Imperials 5.10	WACA
Saturday, 14 Aug 1897	Fremantle	def.	Rovers	Fremantle Oval
West Perth scored five unanswered final quarter goals, coming from 2 goals behind at three-quarter time to win over Imperials with Coward scoring four goals; Rovers failed to field a team, Fremantle being awarded the game on a walkover

=== Round 14 ===
	Round 14
Saturday, 21 Aug 1897	West Perth	def.	Rovers	WACA
Saturday, 21 Aug 1897	Imperials 8.5	def.	Fremantle 3.7	Fremantle Oval
Imperials moved clear in second position with a strong victory over a weakened Fremantle side for whom Thurgood scored two goals; Rovers failed to field a team, West Perth being awarded the game on a walkover

=== Round 15 ===
	Round 15
Saturday, 28 Aug 1897	Rovers	def. by	Imperials	WACA
Saturday, 28 Aug 1897	Fremantle 4.3	drew with	West Perth 4.12	Fremantle Oval
The draw between Fremantle and West Perth controversially ended seven minutes early when the Fremantle timekeeper called time without agreement from the West Perth timekeeper. West Perth were dominating the game at the time.; Thurgood (Fremantle) and De Coit (West Perth) both scored three goals and remained neck and neck in the goal scoring list for the season with 22 and 21 goals respectively; Rovers failed to field a team, Imperials being awarded the game on a walkover

=== Round 16 ===
	Round 16
Saturday, 4 Sep 1897	Rovers	def. by	West Perth	WACA
Saturday, 4 Sep 1897	Fremantle 9.6	def.	Imperials 4.4	Fremantle Oval (crowd: 1,500)
This round was added during the season as a result of the postponement of both fixtures in round 9 (see above); A small attendance in Fremantle saw Fremantle win a match that had no bearing on the final table, Thurgood scoring five goals to finish as the leading goalscorer for the season.; Rovers failed to field a team, West Perth being awarded the game on a walkover

== Ladder ==
1897 ladder
Pos	Team	Pld	W	L	D	GF	GA	PP	Pts
1	West Perth (P)	13	8	0	5	70	46	152.2	42
2	Imperials	14	7	5	2	60	57	105.3	32
3	Fremantle	14	5	5	4	64	67	95.5	28
4	Rovers	13	1	11	1	30	54	55.6	6

Source: WAFL Footy Facts
Rules for classification: 1) points; 2) percentage; 3) number of points for.
(P) Premiers
