= 1959 WANFL season =

Australian rules football season

- Teams: 8
- Premiers: East Perth; 12th premiership
- Minor premiers: East Perth; 11th minor premiership
- Matches played: 88

The 1959 WANFL season was the 75th season of senior football in Perth, Western Australia.

== Ladder ==
1959 ladder
Pos	Team	Pld	W	L	D	PF	PA	PP	Pts
1	East Perth (P)	21	18	3	0	2406	1592	151.1	72
2	East Fremantle	21	13	8	0	1836	1777	103.3	52
3	Perth	21	12	9	0	1781	1688	105.5	48
4	Subiaco	21	12	9	0	1920	1866	102.9	48
5	West Perth	21	10	11	0	1871	1842	101.6	40
6	South Fremantle	21	8	13	0	1883	2097	89.8	32
7	Claremont	21	6	15	0	1822	2251	80.9	24
8	Swan Districts	21	5	16	0	1717	2123	80.9	20

Source: WAFL Footy Facts
Rules for classification: 1) points; 2) percentage; 3) number of points for.
(P) Premiers

== Grand final ==
1959 WANFL Grand Final
Saturday, 10 October (12:00 pm)	East Perth	def.	Subiaco	Subiaco Oval (crowd: 45,245)
5.5; 6.10; 10.17; 12.19 (91)	Q1; Q2; Q3; Final	3.5; 5.9; 6.10; 9.14 (68)	Umpires: Ray Montgomery; Simpson Medal: Graham Farmer (East Perth)
