= 1966 WANFL season =

Australian rules football season

- Teams: 8
- Premiers: Perth; 3rd premiership
- Minor premiers: Perth; 3rd minor premiership
- Matches played: 88

The 1966 WANFL season was the 82nd season of the various incarnations of the Western Australian National Football League.

== Ladder ==
1966 ladder
Pos	Team	Pld	W	L	D	PF	PA	PP	Pts
1	Perth (P)	21	16	5	0	2189	1585	138.1	64
2	East Perth	21	15	6	0	2053	1614	127.2	60
3	West Perth	21	13	8	0	1507	1479	101.9	52
4	East Fremantle	21	12	9	0	1791	1867	95.9	48
5	Claremont	21	8	13	0	1768	1922	92.0	32
6	Swan Districts	21	7	13	1	1945	2009	96.8	30
7	Subiaco	21	6	14	1	1475	1844	80.0	26
8	South Fremantle	21	6	15	0	1592	2000	79.6	24

Source: WAFL Footy Facts
Rules for classification: 1) points; 2) percentage; 3) number of points for.
(P) Premiers

== Finals ==
=== Grand Final ===
1966 WANFL Grand Final
Saturday, 1 October	Perth	def.	East Perth	Subiaco Oval (crowd: 46,763)	Source
6.7; 8.10; 9.22; 11.25 (91)	Q1; Q2; Q3; Final	2.1; 8.10; 8.11; 10.15 (75)	Umpires: Ray Montgomery; Simpson Medal: Barry Cable (Perth)
