= 1895 WAFA season =

- Premiers: Fremantle; 8th premiership

The 1895 WAFA season was the 11th season of senior Australian rules football in Perth, Western Australia. Fremantle won their eighth premiership and forth consecutive premiership of five. The Imperials Football Club were admitted into the league this season, having previously competed in the West Australian Junior Football Association.

== Ladder ==
1895 ladder
Pos	Team	Pld	W	L	D	GF	GA	GD	Pts
1	Fremantle (P)	17	14	2	1	130	50	+80	29
2	Rovers	16	11	4	1	77	52	+25	23
3	Imperials	18	5	13	0	59	97	−38	10
4	West Perth	15	2	13	0	36	103	−67	4

Source: WAFL Footy Facts
Rules for classification: 1) points; 2) percentage; 3) number of points for.
(P) Premiers
