= 1909 WAFL season =

Australian rules football season

- Teams: 8
- Premiers: East Fremantle; 7th premiership
- Minor premiers: East Fremantle; 7th minor premiership

The 1909 WAFL season was the 25th season of senior Australian rules football in Perth, Western Australia.

== Ladder ==
1909 ladder
Pos	Team	Pld	W	L	D	PF	PA	PP	Pts
1	East Fremantle (P)	17	15	2	0	1029	522	197.1	60
2	Perth	17	12	5	0	804	579	138.9	48
3	East Perth	17	10	7	0	746	744	100.3	40
4	South Fremantle	17	9	8	0	819	739	110.8	36
5	North Fremantle	17	8	9	0	769	611	125.9	32
6	West Perth	17	8	9	0	697	751	92.8	32
7	Subiaco	17	4	12	1	606	876	69.2	18
8	Midland Junction	17	1	15	1	552	1200	46.0	6

Source: WAFL Footy Facts
Rules for classification: 1) points; 2) percentage; 3) number of points for.
(P) Premiers

== Finals ==
=== First semi-final ===
	First semi-final
Saturday, 4 September	East Perth 3.5 (23)	def. by	East Fremantle 10.13 (73)	W.A.C.A

=== Second semi-final ===
	Second semi-final
Saturday, 11 September	Perth 8.11 (59)	def.	South Fremantle 3.7 (25)	W.A.C.A.

=== Grand Final ===
1909 WAFL Grand Final
Saturday, 18 September	Perth	def. by	East Fremantle	W.A.C.A
0.0 (0); 2.4 (16); 2.5 (17); 4.6 (30)	Q1; Q2; Q3; Final	3.5 (23); 5.5 (35); 7.6 (48); 8.8 (56)	Umpires: Ivo Crapp
