= 1904 WAFA season =

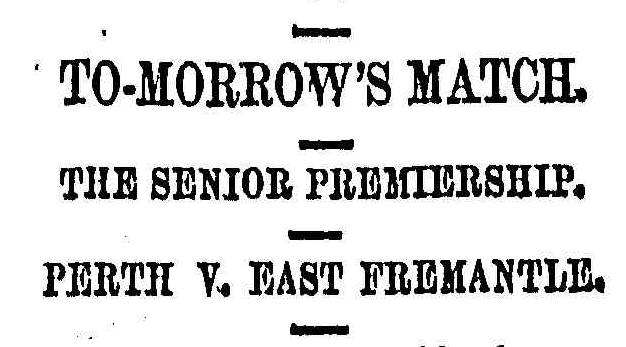
- Teams: 6
- Premiers: East Fremantle; 4th premiership
- Minor premiers: East Fremantle; 4th minor premiership

The 1904 WAFA season was the 20th season of senior Australian rules football in Perth, Western Australia.

== Ladder ==
1904 ladder
| Pos | Team | Pld | W | L | D | PF | PA | PP | Pts |
|---|---|---|---|---|---|---|---|---|---|
| 1 | East Fremantle (P) | 15 | 12 | 3 | 0 | 882 | 398 | 221.6 | 48 |
| 2 | Perth | 15 | 11 | 4 | 0 | 867 | 422 | 205.5 | 44 |
| 3 | North Fremantle | 15 | 10 | 5 | 0 | 695 | 469 | 148.2 | 40 |
| 4 | West Perth | 15 | 8 | 7 | 0 | 705 | 584 | 120.7 | 32 |
| 5 | Subiaco | 15 | 3 | 12 | 0 | 374 | 1022 | 36.6 | 12 |
| 6 | South Fremantle | 15 | 1 | 14 | 0 | 340 | 968 | 35.1 | 4 |

Source: WAFL Footy Facts
Rules for classification: 1) points; 2) percentage; 3) number of points for.
(P) Premiers

== Grand Final ==
1904 WAFA Grand Final
Saturday, 17 September | East Fremantle | def. | Perth | Fremantle Oval
1.4 (10); 3.5 (23); 8.5 (53); 12.11 (83) | Q1; Q2; Q3; Final | 2.1 (13); 2.2 (14); 2.6 (18); 3.7 (25)
