= 1905 WAFA season =

- Teams: 7
- Premiers: West Perth; 4th premiership
- Minor premiers: West Perth; 4th minor premiership

The 1905 WAFA season was the 21st season of senior Australian rules football in Perth, Western Australia. This was the first year where the Grand Final results became a draw.

== Ladder ==
1905 ladder
Pos	Team	Pld	W	L	D	PF	PA	PP	Pts
1	West Perth (P)	15	13	2	0	885	419	211.2	52
2	North Fremantle	15	12	3	0	1052	502	209.6	48
3	East Fremantle	14	10	4	0	855	540	158.3	40
4	South Fremantle	15	8	7	0	895	662	135.2	32
5	Perth	12	2	10	0	456	756	60.3	8
6	Midland Junction	13	2	11	0	379	1018	37.2	8
7	Subiaco	10	0	10	0	167	792	21.1	0

Source: WAFL Footy Facts
Rules for classification: 1) points; 2) percentage; 3) number of points for.
(P) Premiers

== Grand Final ==
1905 WAFA Grand Final
Saturday, 30 September	East Fremantle	v	West Perth	Fremantle Oval
2.0 (12); 4.3 (27); 6.3 (39); 6.5 (41)	Q1; Q2; Q3; Final	3.4 (22); 3.7 (25); 3.9 (27); 5.11 (41)

=== Grand final replay ===
1905 WAFA Grand final replay
Saturday, 7 October	East Fremantle	def. by	West Perth	North Fremantle Oval (crowd: 6,000)
0.0 (0); 1.6 (12); 3.7 (25); 3.9 (27)	Q1; Q2; Q3; Final	2.3 (15); 2.4 (16); 4.4 (28); 4.7 (31)
