= 1903 WAFA season =

- Teams: 6
- Premiers: East Fremantle; 3rd premiership
- Minor premiers: East Fremantle; 3rd minor premiership

The 1903 WAFA season was the 19th season of senior Australian rules football in Perth, Western Australia.

== Ladder ==
Pos	Team	Pld	W	L	D	PF	PA	PP	Pts
1	East Fremantle (P)	18	16	2	0	1012	444	227.9	64
2	West Perth	18	11	6	1	818	659	124.1	46
3	North Fremantle	18	9	9	0	726	679	106.9	36
4	Perth	18	8	10	0	650	772	84.2	32
5	South Fremantle	15	5	9	1	544	616	88.3	22
6	Subiaco	15	1	14	0	321	901	35.6	4

Source: WAFL Footy Facts
Rules for classification: 1) points; 2) percentage; 3) number of points for.
(P) Premiers
