= 1902 WAFA season =

- Teams: 6
- Premiers: East Fremantle; 2nd premiership
- Minor premiers: East Fremantle; 2nd minor premiership

The 1902 WAFA season was the 18th season of senior Australian rules football in Perth, Western Australia.

== Ladder ==
Pos	Team	Pld	W	L	D	PF	PA	PP	Pts
1	East Fremantle (P)	18	15	3	0	984	539	182.6	60
2	North Fremantle	18	13	5	0	1012	619	163.5	52
3	West Perth	18	11	7	0	799	802	99.6	44
4	Perth	18	9	9	0	904	819	110.4	36
5	South Fremantle	15	3	12	0	536	777	69.0	12
6	Subiaco	15	0	15	0	400	1079	37.1	0

Source: WAFL Footy Facts
Rules for classification: 1) points; 2) percentage; 3) number of points for.
(P) Premiers
