= 1893 WAFA season =

- Premiers: Fremantle; 6th premiership

The 1893 WAFA season was the 9th season of senior Australian rules football in Perth, Western Australia. Fremantle won their sixth premiership and second out of a five-peat. The original East Perth Football Club dissolved after two seasons, due to poor performance which resulted in the club receiving wooden spoons in both years.

== Ladder ==
1893 ladder
Pos	Team	Pld	W	L	D	GF	GA	GD	Pts
1	Fremantle (P)	12	9	2	1	52	17	+35	19
2	West Perth	12	8	3	1	36	32	+4	17
3	Rovers	12	0	12	0	18	57	−39	0

Source: WAFL Footy Facts
Rules for classification: 1) points; 2) percentage; 3) number of points for.
(P) Premiers
