= 1910 WAFL season =

Australian rules football season

- Teams: 8
- Premiers: East Fremantle; 8th premiership
- Minor premiers: East Fremantle; 8th minor premiership

The 1910 WAFL season was the 26th season of senior Australian rules football in Perth, Western Australia.

== Ladder ==
1910 ladder
Pos	Team	Pld	W	L	D	PF	PA	PP	Pts
1	East Fremantle (P)	17	13	4	0	977	448	218.1	52
2	East Perth	17	13	4	0	850	547	155.4	52
3	West Perth	17	11	6	0	865	662	130.7	44
4	Perth	17	11	6	0	798	611	130.6	44
5	South Fremantle	17	10	7	0	781	651	120.0	40
6	Subiaco	17	4	13	0	512	998	51.3	16
7	North Fremantle	17	3	14	0	553	911	60.7	12
8	Midland Junction	17	3	14	0	576	1084	53.1	12

Source: WAFL Footy Facts
Rules for classification: 1) points; 2) percentage; 3) number of points for.
(P) Premiers

== Finals ==
=== First semi-final ===
	First semi-final
Saturday, 17 September	West Perth 4.9 (33)	def. by	East Perth 5.10 (40)	W.A.C.A

=== Second semi-final ===
	Second semi-final
Saturday, 24 September	East Fremantle 4.6 (30)	def.	South Fremantle 4.4 (28)	Fremantle Oval

=== Grand Final ===
1910 WAFL Grand Final
Saturday, 1 October	East Fremantle	def.	East Perth	Fremantle Oval
2.0 (12); 2.1 (13); 3.1 (19); 5.5 (35)	Q1; Q2; Q3; Final	1.2 (14); 2.4 (16); 2.9 (21); 2.10 (22)	Umpires: Ivo Crapp
