= 1914 WAFL season =

Australian rules football season

- Teams: 8
- Premiers: East Fremantle; 10th premiership
- Minor premiers: East Fremantle; 10th minor premiership

The 1914 WAFL season was the 30th season of senior Australian rules football in Perth, Western Australia.

== Ladder ==
1914 ladder
Pos	Team	Pld	W	L	D	PF	PA	PP	Pts
1	East Fremantle (P)	14	11	3	0	1045	636	164.3	44
2	South Fremantle	14	11	3	0	934	676	138.2	44
3	Perth	14	11	3	0	870	631	137.9	44
4	Subiaco	14	10	4	0	967	607	159.3	40
5	East Perth	14	7	7	0	698	799	87.4	28
6	Midland Junction	14	3	11	0	699	974	71.8	12
7	West Perth	14	2	12	0	679	1146	59.2	8
8	North Fremantle	14	1	13	0	628	1051	59.8	4

Source: WAFL Footy Facts
Rules for classification: 1) points; 2) percentage; 3) number of points for.
(P) Premiers

== Finals ==
=== Grand Final ===
1914 WAFL Grand Final
Saturday, 10 October	East Fremantle	def.	South Fremantle	Subiaco Oval
1.2 (8); 2.10 (22); 3.10 (28); 5.13 (43)	Q1; Q2; Q3; Final	1.1 (7); 1.1 (7); 3.6 (24); 3.6 (24)	Umpires: Ivo Crapp
