= 1908 WAFL season =

Australian rules football season

- Teams: 8
- Premiers: East Fremantle; 6th premiership
- Minor premiers: East Fremantle; 6th minor premiership

The 1908 WAFL season was the 24th season of senior Australian rules football in Perth, Western Australia.

== Ladder ==
1908 ladder
Pos	Team	Pld	W	L	D	PF	PA	PP	Pts
1	East Fremantle (P)	17	14	3	0	936	529	176.9	56
2	Perth	17	13	4	0	826	602	137.2	52
3	South Fremantle	17	10	7	0	876	672	130.4	40
4	West Perth	17	8	8	1	732	780	93.8	34
5	East Perth	17	7	9	1	771	823	93.7	30
6	North Fremantle	17	7	10	0	664	695	95.5	28
7	Midland Junction	17	5	11	1	715	878	81.4	22
8	Subiaco	17	2	14	1	590	1131	52.2	10

Source: WAFL Footy Facts
Rules for classification: 1) points; 2) percentage; 3) number of points for.
(P) Premiers

== Finals ==
=== First semi-final ===
	First semi-final
Saturday, 12 September	East Fremantle 3.13 (31)	def.	South Fremantle 4.6 (30)	Fremantle Oval

=== Second semi-final ===
	Second semi-final
Saturday, 19 September	Perth 6.10 (46)	def.	West Perth 6.6 (42)	W.A.C.A.

=== Grand Final ===
1908 WAFL Grand Final
Saturday, 26 September	East Fremantle	def.	Perth	Fremantle Oval
0.0 (0); 2.4 (16); 2.4 (16); 5.7 (37)	Q1; Q2; Q3; Final	0.3 (3); 0.7 (7); 0.8 (8); 0.8 (8)	Umpires: Ivo Crapp
