= 1911 WAFL season =

Australian rules football season

- Teams: 7
- Premiers: East Fremantle; 9th premiership
- Minor premiers: East Fremantle; 9th minor premiership

The 1911 WAFL season was the 27th season of senior Australian rules football in Perth, Western Australia.

== Ladder ==
1911 ladder
Pos	Team	Pld	W	L	D	PF	PA	PP	Pts
1	East Fremantle (P)	13	11	2	0	952	457	208.3	44
2	North Fremantle	13	8	5	0	638	645	98.9	32
3	West Perth	13	7	6	0	586	611	95.9	28
4	Perth	13	7	6	0	570	647	88.1	28
5	South Fremantle	13	6	7	0	582	648	89.8	24
6	Subiaco	13	4	9	0	549	585	93.8	16
7	East Perth	12	2	10	0	414	698	59.3	8

Source: WAFL Footy Facts
Rules for classification: 1) points; 2) percentage; 3) number of points for.
(P) Premiers

== Finals ==
=== First semi-final ===
	First semi-final
Saturday, 16 September	West Perth 9.11 (65)	def.	Perth 9.8 (62)	W.A.C.A

=== Second semi-final ===
	Second semi-final
Saturday, 23 September	East Fremantle 8.12 (60)	def.	North Fremantle 5.6 (36)	Fremantle Oval

=== Grand Final ===
1911 WAFL Grand Final
Saturday, 30 September	West Perth	def. by	East Fremantle	Subiaco Oval
0.2 (2); 3.2 (20); 6.2 (38); 7.3 (45)	Q1; Q2; Q3; Final	4.2 (26); 8.6 (54); 9.10 (64); 14.12 (96)	Umpires: Ivo Crapp
