= 1913 WAFL season =

Australian rules football season

- Teams: 7
- Premiers: Subiaco; 2nd premiership
- Minor premiers: Subiaco; 2nd minor premiership

The 1913 WAFL season was the 29th season of senior Australian rules football in Perth, Western Australia.

== Ladder ==
1913 ladder
Pos	Team	Pld	W	L	D	PF	PA	PP	Pts
1	Subiaco (P)	17	13	4	0	1067	700	152.4	52
2	East Fremantle	17	12	5	0	916	579	158.2	48
3	Perth	17	11	5	1	877	593	147.9	46
4	South Fremantle	17	9	8	0	653	720	90.7	36
5	North Fremantle	17	6	11	0	600	839	71.5	24
6	West Perth	17	3	13	1	612	1083	56.5	14
7	East Perth	12	2	10	0	458	669	68.5	8

Source: WAFL Footy Facts
Rules for classification: 1) points; 2) percentage; 3) number of points for.
(P) Premiers

== Finals ==
=== Grand Final ===
1913 WAFL Grand Final
Saturday, 11 October	Subiaco	def.	Perth	W.A.C.A
4.2 (26); 4.3 (27); 6.5 (41); 6.7 (43)	Q1; Q2; Q3; Final	1.2 (8); 4.4 (28); 4.5 (29); 4.7 (31)	Umpires: Ivo Crapp
