= 1964 WANFL season =

Australian rules football season

- Teams: 8
- Premiers: Claremont; 4th premiership
- Minor premiers: East Fremantle; 28th minor premiership
- Matches played: 88

The 1964 WANFL season was the 80th season of the various incarnations of the Western Australian National Football League.

== Ladder ==
Pos	Team	Pld	W	L	D	PF	PA	PP	Pts
1	East Fremantle	21	14	6	1	1704	1476	115.4	58
2	Perth	21	14	7	0	1824	1680	108.6	56
3	Subiaco	21	13	7	1	2031	1852	109.7	54
4	Claremont (P)	21	12	9	0	1920	1780	107.9	48
5	West Perth	21	11	10	0	1762	1631	108.0	44
6	Swan Districts	21	9	12	0	1792	1762	101.7	36
7	South Fremantle	21	7	14	0	1812	2075	87.3	28
8	East Perth	21	3	18	0	1434	2023	70.9	12

Source: WAFL Footy Facts
Rules for classification: 1) points; 2) percentage; 3) number of points for.
(P) Premiers

== Finals ==
=== Grand Final ===
1964 WANFL Grand Final
Saturday, 10 October	East Fremantle	def. by	Claremont	Subiaco Oval (crowd: 45,102)
1.2; 7.5; 10.6; 15.8 (98)	Q1; Q2; Q3; Final	4.9; 6.9; 10.13; 14.18 (102)	Umpires: Ray Montgomery; Simpson Medal: Norm Rogers (East Fremantle)
