= 1912 WAFL season =

Australian rules football season

- Teams: 7
- Premiers: Subiaco; 1st premiership
- Minor premiers: Subiaco; 1st minor premiership

The 1912 WAFL season was the 28th season of senior Australian rules football in Perth, Western Australia.

== Ladder ==
1912 ladder
Pos	Team	Pld	W	L	D	PF	PA	PP	Pts
1	Subiaco (P)	17	16	1	0	1095	498	219.9	64
2	East Fremantle	16	13	2	1	896	557	160.9	54
3	South Fremantle	17	7	9	1	721	821	87.8	30
4	North Fremantle	17	7	9	1	681	816	83.5	30
5	East Perth	16	5	11	0	570	777	73.4	20
6	West Perth	17	4	12	1	603	927	65.0	18
7	Perth	12	2	10	0	518	688	75.3	8

Source: WAFL Footy Facts
Rules for classification: 1) points; 2) percentage; 3) number of points for.
(P) Premiers

== Finals ==
=== Grand Final ===
1912 WAFL Grand Final
Saturday, 12 October	Subiaco	def.	East Fremantle	Perth Oval
1.2 (8); 1.3 (9); 4.8 (32); 5.8 (38)	Q1; Q2; Q3; Final	3.1 (19); 4.4 (28); 4.5 (29); 4.5 (29)	Umpires: Ivo Crapp
