= 1918 WAFL season =

Australian rules football season

- Teams: 6
- Premiers: East Fremantle; 11th premiership
- Minor premiers: East Perth; 1st minor premiership
- Matches played: 49

The 1918 WAFL season was the 34th season of the West Australian Football League.

== Ladder ==
1918 ladder
Pos	Team	Pld	W	L	D	PF	PA	PP	Pts
1	East Perth	15	14	1	0	1004	506	198.4	56
2	East Fremantle (P)	15	10	5	0	916	571	160.4	40
3	Perth	15	8	7	0	766	683	112.2	32
4	South Fremantle	15	7	8	0	660	863	76.5	28
5	Subiaco	15	4	11	0	593	769	77.1	16
6	West Perth	15	2	13	0	509	1056	48.2	8

Source: WAFL Footy Facts
Rules for classification: 1) points; 2) percentage; 3) number of points for.
(P) Premiers

== Grand Final ==
1918 WAFL Grand Final
Saturday, 21 September (12:00 pm)	East Perth	def. by	East Fremantle	Subiaco Oval (crowd: 7,000)
3.4 (22); 5.4 (34); 8.5 (53); 8.5 (53)	Q1; Q2; Q3; Final	3.1 (19); 6.4 (40); 8.5 (53); 11.8 (74)	Umpires: Ivo Crapp
