= 1943 WANFL season =

Australian rules football season

- Teams: 8
- Premiers: East Fremantle; 19th premiership
- Minor premiers: Subiaco; 4th minor premiership
- Matches played: 72

The 1943 WANFL season was the 59th season of the Western Australian National Football League.

== Ladder ==
1943 ladder
Pos	Team	Pld	W	L	D	PF	PA	PP	Pts
1	Subiaco	17	13	4	0	1343	1016	132.2	52
2	East Fremantle (P)	17	12	4	1	1753	1189	147.4	50
3	West Perth	17	10	7	0	1736	1257	138.1	40
4	Swan Districts	17	9	8	0	1308	1382	94.6	36
5	Claremont	17	8	8	1	1519	1298	117.0	34
6	East Perth	17	7	10	0	1237	1388	89.1	28
7	Perth	17	4	13	0	920	1398	65.8	16
8	South Fremantle	17	4	13	0	961	1849	52.0	16

Source: WAFL Footy Facts
Rules for classification: 1) points; 2) percentage; 3) number of points for.
(P) Premiers

== Finals ==
=== First semi-final ===
	First semi-final
Saturday, 18 September	West Perth 9.20 (74)	def. by	Swan Districts 10.17 (77)	Subiaco Oval (crowd: 3,347)

=== Second semi-final ===
	Second semi-final
Saturday, 25 September	Subiaco 9.6 (60)	def. by	East Fremantle 15.13 (103)	Subiaco Oval (crowd: 4,788)

=== Preliminary final ===
	Preliminary final
Saturday, 2 October	Subiaco 7.11 (53)	def. by	Swan Districts 13.17 (95)	Subiaco Oval (crowd: 6,756)

=== Grand Final ===
1943 WANFL Grand Final
Saturday, 9 October	East Fremantle	def.	Swan Districts	Subiaco Oval (crowd: 8,415)	Source
4.2; 11.8; 16.9; 17.15 (117)	Q1; Q2; Q3; Final	4.3; 5.3; 7.9; 11.11 (77)	Umpires: L Mosey
Swan Districts first ever Grand Final appearance.
