= Mal Atwell =

Australian rules footballer and coach

Personal information
- Full name: Malcolm Walter Atwell
- Born: 5 March 1937 (age 89); Perth, Western Australia

Playing career^{1}
| Years | Club | Games (Goals) |
| 1958–1965 | East Perth | 162 (14) |
| 1966–1969 | Perth | 76 (31) |

Representative team honours^{2}
| Years | Team | Games (Goals) |
| 1960–1968 | Western Australia | 17 (0) |

Coaching career^{3}
| Years | Club | Games (W–L–D) |
| 1966–1971 | Perth | 137 (94–43–1) |
| 1968–1969 | Western Australia | 5 (1–4–0) |
| 1972–1973 | South Fremantle | 42 (16–26–0) |
- ^{1} Playing statistics correct to the end of 1969.^{2} Representative statistics correct as of 1968.^{3} Coaching statistics correct as of 1973.

Malcolm Walter Atwell (born 5 March 1937) is a former Australian rules football player and coach. He played for East Perth and Perth in the West Australian National Football League (WANFL).

== Playing career ==
Atwell was a tough, hard hitting footballer and spent most of his time as either a defender or in the ruck.

He started his career in 1958 at East Perth and played in their premiership team that season as well as the next. After 162 games with East Perth, he transferred to Perth where he played 76 games.

After making his interstate debut in 1960, Atwell represented his state in both the 1961 Brisbane Carnival and 1966 Hobart Carnivals. In all he made 17 interstate appearances and coached his state at the 1969 Adelaide Carnival.

He was an inaugural inductee in the West Australian Football Hall of Fame in 2004.

== Coaching career ==
He had a highly successful stint as Perth coach and was later named as the coach of Perth's official Team of the Century.

From 1966 to 1969 he was captain-coach of Perth and led them to premierships in 1966, 1967 and 1968. He remained coach for the 1970 and 1971 seasons but retired as a player.

The following year he joined South Fremantle as non-playing coach and spent two seasons in the role.

== Personal life ==
His granddaughter Amy Atwell is a professional basketball player who has played for the Hawaii Rainbow Wahine, Los Angeles Sparks, Phoenix Mercury and Perth Lynx.
