= 1894 WAFA season =

- Premiers: Fremantle; 7th premiership

The 1894 WAFA season was the 10th season of senior Australian rules football in Perth, Western Australia. Fremantle won their seventh premiership and third out of a five-peat.

== Ladder ==
1894 ladder
Pos	Team	Pld	W	L	D	GF	GA	GD	Pts
1	Fremantle (P)	12	8	3	1	68	36	+32	17
2	West Perth	12	7	5	0	58	53	+5	14
3	Rovers	12	2	9	1	33	70	−37	5

Source: WAFL Footy Facts
Rules for classification: 1) points; 2) percentage; 3) number of points for.
(P) Premiers
