= 1921 WAFL season =

Australian rules football season

- Teams: 6
- Premiers: East Perth; 3rd premiership
- Minor premiers: East Fremantle; 13th minor premiership
- Matches played: 49

The 1921 WAFL season was the 37th season of the West Australian Football League.

== Ladder ==
1921 ladder
Pos	Team	Pld	W	L	D	PF	PA	PP	Pts
1	East Fremantle	15	10	5	0	851	835	101.9	40
2	East Perth (P)	15	8	7	0	905	876	103.3	32
3	West Perth	15	7	7	1	917	880	104.2	30
4	South Fremantle	15	7	8	0	1075	956	112.4	28
5	Subiaco	15	6	8	1	900	1019	88.3	26
6	Perth	15	6	9	0	960	1042	92.1	24

Source: WAFL Footy Facts
Rules for classification: 1) points; 2) percentage; 3) number of points for.
(P) Premiers

== Grand Final ==
1921 WAFL Grand Final
Saturday, 1 October (12:00 pm)	East Fremantle	def. by	East Perth	Subiaco Oval (crowd: 9,000)
1.2 (8); 2.7 (19); 2.7 (19); 4.8 (32)	Q1; Q2; Q3; Final	1.1 (7); 3.4 (22); 4.8 (32); 5.9 (39)	Umpires: Isaachsen
