= 1961 WANFL season =

Australian rules football season

- Teams: 8
- Premiers: Swan Districts; 1st premiership
- Minor premiers: East Perth; 12th minor premiership
- Matches played: 88

The 1961 WANFL season was the 77th season of the various incarnations of the Western Australian National Football League.

== Home-and-away season ==
=== Round 1 ===
	Round 1
Saturday, 15 April	Swan Districts 12.11 (83)	def.	Perth 11.13 (79)	Bassendean Oval (crowd: 5,102)
Saturday, 15 April	West Perth 9.11 (65)	def. by	East Perth 11.17 (83)	Leederville Oval
Saturday, 15 April	Subiaco 14.22 (106)	def.	Claremont 14.6 (90)	Subiaco Oval
Saturday, 15 April	East Fremantle 18.15 (123)	def.	South Fremantle 11.9 (75)	Fremantle Oval

== Ladder ==
1961 ladder
Pos	Team	Pld	W	L	D	PF	PA	PP	Pts
1	East Perth	21	19	2	0	2076	1600	129.8	76
2	Swan Districts (P)	21	12	7	2	2052	1750	117.3	52
3	Subiaco	21	11	10	0	1895	1940	97.7	44
4	East Fremantle	21	10	10	1	1755	1678	104.6	42
5	West Perth	21	9	12	0	1923	1847	104.1	36
6	Perth	21	8	12	1	1739	1847	94.2	34
7	Claremont	21	7	14	0	1848	2244	82.4	28
8	South Fremantle	21	6	15	0	1737	2119	82.0	24

Source: WAFL Footy Facts
Rules for classification: 1) points; 2) percentage; 3) number of points for.
(P) Premiers

== Finals ==
=== Grand Final ===
1961 WANFL Grand Final
Saturday, 7 October	East Perth	def. by	Swan Districts	Subiaco Oval (crowd: 41,102)
1.2; 5.6; 8.10; 12.15 (87)	Q1; Q2; Q3; Final	4.1; 8.1; 14.5; 17.9 (111)	Umpires: Len Gardner; Simpson Medal: Keith Slater (Swan Districts)
