= 1922 WAFL season =

Australian rules football season

- Teams: 6
- Premiers: East Perth; 4th premiership
- Minor premiers: East Perth; 4th minor premiership
- Sandover Medallist: Harold Boyd (West Perth)
- Bernie Naylor Medallist: "Bonny" Campbell (South Fremantle)
- Matches played: 48

The 1922 WAFL season was the 38th season of the West Australian Football League. It saw East Perth equal East Fremantle's feat of winning four consecutive premierships, this time against a rejuvenated West Perth team which had experienced a lean period since 1912. Their most notable feat during the season was a record comeback against South Fremantle, but on an August tour of the Eastern States the Royals also defeated SANFL premiers Norwood by the score of 8.20 (68) to 7.10 (52) and runners-up West Adelaide by 11.12 (78) to 7.12 (54), after having lost by a point to St. Kilda two weeks beforehand. A consequence of their trip – hastily planned when Subiaco's tour there was cancelled during July – was that their last round match with wooden-spooner Perth was never played – a cancellation to be repeated the following season.

1922 also saw a dispute with the City of Perth during late June and early July over charges for use of the WACA and Leederville Oval, which led to proposals to play the season's WAFL finals at Claremont Showground, which had not been used for WAFL matches since 1907. Unlike a similar dispute during 1940 that affected the whole season at Leederville and Perth Oval, however, this dispute only affected a single round of matches, and was resolved before Round 11.

== Home-and-away season ==
=== Round 1 ===
	Round 1
Saturday, 6 May (3:00 pm)	Perth 9.16 (70)	def.	Subiaco 7.8 (50)	WACA
Saturday, 6 May (3:00 pm)	East Fremantle 10.9 (69)	def.	South Fremantle 9.11 (65)	Fremantle Oval
Saturday, 6 May (3:00 pm)	West Perth 7.7 (49)	def. by	East Perth 11.6 (72)	Leederville Oval

=== Round 2 ===
	Round 2
Saturday, 13 May (3:00 pm)	Perth 6.5 (41)	def. by	South Fremantle 7.4 (46)	WACA
Saturday, 13 May (3:00 pm)	East Fremantle 6.10 (46)	def.	West Perth 4.5 (29)	Fremantle Oval
Saturday, 13 May (3:00 pm)	Subiaco 6.3 (39)	def.	East Perth 5.8 (38)	Subiaco Oval
A thrilling game with a hectic finish despite deplorable weather sees Subiaco pip the three-time premiers with four last-quarter goals.

=== Round 3 ===
	Round 3
Saturday, 20 May (3:00 pm)	East Perth 8.15 (63)	def.	South Fremantle 6.4 (40)	Perth Oval
Saturday, 20 May (3:00 pm)	West Perth 6.7 (43)	def.	Subiaco 2.8 (20)	Leederville Oval
Saturday, 20 May (3:00 pm)	East Fremantle 7.8 (50)	def. by	Perth 6.15 (51)	Fremantle Oval
Subiaco kick what remains their lowest score on the oval which would become their home ground eighty-two seasons later.

=== Round 4 ===
	Round 4
Saturday, 27 May (3:00 pm)	West Perth 10.14 (74)	def.	Perth 8.11 (59)	Leederville Oval
Saturday, 27 May (3:00 pm)	East Perth 11.10 (76)	def.	East Fremantle 5.8 (38)	Perth Oval
Saturday, 27 May (3:00 pm)	South Fremantle 12.23 (95)	def.	Subiaco 6.11 (47)	Fremantle Oval
A record gate sees East Perth repeat its past three Grand Final victories in convincing style, with Thomas showing the form that would win him the 1923 Sandover.

=== Round 5 (Foundation Day) ===
	Round 5
Saturday, 3 June (3:00 pm)	Subiaco 14.11 (95)	def.	East Fremantle 14.9 (93)	Subiaco Oval
Saturday, 3 June (3:00 pm)	South Fremantle 7.14 (56)	def. by	West Perth 11.11 (77)	Fremantle Oval
Monday, 5 June (3:00 pm)	Perth 5.11 (41)	def. by	East Perth 8.23 (71)	WACA

=== Round 6 ===
	Round 6
Saturday, 10 June (3:00 pm)	East Fremantle 9.11 (65)	def. by	South Fremantle 10.7 (67)	Fremantle Oval (crowd: 4000)
Saturday, 10 June (3:00 pm)	East Perth 6.12 (48)	def. by	West Perth 10.9 (69)	Perth Oval
Saturday, 10 June (3:00 pm)	Subiaco 8.12 (60)	def. by	Perth 8.17 (65)	Subiaco Oval
Another record gate of £226 sees West Perth, with a brilliant second and third quarter, win its fourth consecutive game.; Perth win their last game for 21 matches despite a protest by Subiaco that the bell had been sounded before a last-minute Redleg goal in the second quarter.; Subiaco's protest is dismissed although problems with the bell at Subiaco Oval had been known before the 1922 season opened.

=== Round 7 ===
	Round 7
Saturday, 17 June (3:00 pm)	South Fremantle 9.18 (72)	def.	Perth 8.11 (59)	Fremantle Oval
Saturday, 17 June (3:00 pm)	West Perth 10.14 (74)	def.	East Fremantle 10.5 (65)	Leederville Oval
Saturday, 17 June (3:00 pm)	East Perth 11.18 (84)	def.	Subiaco 5.12 (42)	Perth Oval
West Perth win a fifth game on end via fine snap from "Tony" Tyson after a superb display by both teams.

=== Round 8 ===
	Round 8
Saturday, 24 June (3:00 pm)	Perth 7.12 (54)	def. by	East Fremantle 9.15 (69)	WACA
Saturday, 24 June (3:00 pm)	Subiaco 5.9 (39)	def. by	West Perth 9.5 (59)	Subiaco Oval
Saturday, 24 June (3:00 pm)	South Fremantle 12.11 (83)	def. by	East Perth 12.12 (84)	Fremantle Oval
East Perth produce a remarkable comeback to win after being thirty-seven points behind at three-quarter time, a record not equalled or beaten until the 1957 Preliminary Final.

=== Round 9 ===
	Round 9
Saturday, 1 July (3:00 pm)	Perth 7.12 (54)	def. by	West Perth 11.9 (75)	WACA
Saturday, 1 July (3:00 pm)	Subiaco 6.4 (40)	def. by	South Fremantle 13.12 (90)	Subiaco Oval
Saturday, 1 July (3:00 pm)	East Fremantle 9.8 (62)	def. by	East Perth 12.11 (83)	Fremantle Oval

=== Round 10 ===
	Round 10
Saturday, 8 July (2:00 pm)	South Fremantle 4.11 (35)	def. by	West Perth 7.8 (50)	Claremont Showground
Saturday, 8 July (3:00 pm)	East Fremantle 12.13 (85)	def.	Subiaco 4.7 (31)	Fremantle Oval
Saturday, 8 July (4:00 pm)	Perth 6.9 (45)	def. by	East Perth 7.11 (53)	Claremont Showground
A dispute with the City of Perth over the use of the WACA and Leederville causes two matches to be transferred to Claremont Showground, where Claremont-Cottesloe would play its inaugural season of 1926.

=== Round 11 ===
	Round 11
Saturday, 15 July (3:00 pm)	East Perth 7.14 (56)	def.	West Perth 3.5 (23)	Perth Oval
Saturday, 15 July (3:00 pm)	Subiaco 12.11 (83)	def.	Perth 5.14 (44)	Subiaco Oval
Saturday, 15 July (3:00 pm)	South Fremantle 6.11 (47)	def. by	East Fremantle 7.13 (55)	Fremantle Oval
Another record gate of £352 sees East Perth convincing end West Perth's eight-match winning run as many Cardinal players do not show anything like their true form.

=== Round 12 ===
	Round 12
Saturday, 22 July (3:00 pm)	East Perth 9.14 (68)	def.	Subiaco 7.12 (54)	Perth Oval
Saturday, 22 July (3:00 pm)	South Fremantle 17.12 (114)	def.	Perth 6.8 (44)	Fremantle Oval
Saturday, 22 July (3:00 pm)	West Perth 5.6 (36)	def.	East Fremantle 6.5 (41)	Subiaco Oval
East Fremantle hold off West Perth in a last quarter where only one behind was kicked.

=== Round 13 ===
	Round 13
Saturday, 29 July (3:00 pm)	West Perth 5.8 (38)	def.	Subiaco 3.17 (35)	Leederville Oval
Saturday, 29 July (3:00 pm)	South Fremantle 5.15 (45)	def. by	East Perth 7.11 (53)	Fremantle Oval
Saturday, 29 July (3:00 pm)	Perth 3.4 (22)	def. by	East Fremantle 5.10 (40)	WACA

=== Round 14 ===
	Round 14
Saturday, 5 August (3:00 pm)	Perth 5.7 (37)	def. by	West Perth 5.12 (42)	WACA
Saturday, 5 August (3:00 pm)	East Fremantle 4.6 (30)	def.	East Perth 4.5 (29)	Fremantle Oval
Saturday, 5 August (3:00 pm)	Subiaco 9.16 (70)	def.	South Fremantle 8.7 (55)	Subiaco Oval
A brilliant defensive display by East Fremantle hold East Perth to one point in a thrilling last quarter.; Subiaco avoid the wooden spoon by winning a windswept match with no score into the wind after quarter-time.

=== Fitzroy Tour ===
	Round 14
Saturday, 12 August (3:00 pm)	West Perth 7.6 (48)	def. by	Fitzroy 7.7 (49)	Perth Oval (crowd: 17,000)
Wednesday, 16 August (3:00 pm)	East Fremantle 8.13 (61)	def. by	Fitzroy 10.12 (72)	Fremantle Oval (crowd: 11,000)
Saturday, 19 August (3:00 pm)	Western Australia 7.7 (49)	def.	Fitzroy 5.4 (34)	Subiaco Oval (crowd: 18,832)
Record crowds see several games in Perth by VFL premiers-to-be Fitzroy, whilst WAFL games are suspended for this and an interstate tour by East Perth. It was the first tour of Western Australia by any VFL club.

=== Round 15 ===
	Round 15
Saturday, 26 August (3:00 pm)	West Perth 8.13 (61)	def.	South Fremantle 7.11 (53)	Leederville Oval
Saturday, 26 August (3:00 pm)	East Fremantle 14.17 (101)	def.	Subiaco 7.9 (51)	Fremantle Oval
East Perth did not play Perth because the Royals' tour of South Australia and Victoria did not finish until 4 September.

== Ladder ==
1922 WAFL ladder
Pos	Team	Pld	W	L	D	PF	PA	PP	Pts
1	East Perth (P)	14	11	3	0	878	660	133.0	44
2	West Perth	15	11	4	0	799	716	111.6	44
3	East Fremantle	15	9	6	0	909	810	112.2	36
4	South Fremantle	15	6	9	0	963	878	109.7	24
5	Subiaco	15	4	11	0	756	1028	73.5	16
6	Perth	14	3	11	0	686	899	76.3	12

Rules for classification: 1) points; 2) percentage; 3) number of points for.
(P) Premiers

== Finals ==
=== First semi-final ===
	First semi-final
Saturday, 2 September (3:00 pm)	West Perth 12.10 (82)	def.	East Fremantle 4.8 (32)	Subiaco Oval (crowd: 8,600)
West Perth thrash East Fremantle after half-time and ensure Old Easts miss the Grand Final for the first time in seven seasons.

=== Second semi-final ===
	Second semi-final
Saturday, 9 September (3:00 pm)	East Perth 9.8 (62)	def. by	South Fremantle 9.11 (65)	Subiaco Oval (crowd: 8,312)
South Fremantle, led by "Billy" Adams, win a thrilling game over the three-time premiers.

=== Final ===
	Final
Saturday, 16 September (3:00 pm)	West Perth 13.8 (86)	def.	South Fremantle 8.10 (58)	Subiaco Oval (crowd: 8,732)
West Perth win easily in the final term after an even three-quarters to enter their first premiership decider for eleven seasons.

=== Grand Final ===
1922 WAFL Grand Final
Saturday, 23 September (3:00 pm)	East Perth	def.	West Perth	Subiaco Oval (crowd: 12,721)
1.0 (6); 3.7 (25); 4.9 (33); 7.13 (55)	Q1; Q2; Q3; Final	1.6 (12); 1.6 (12); 4.7 (31); 5.9 (39)	Umpires: Frank O‘Connor
Owens 4, King, Giese, B. Harrold	Goals	Wimbridge 2, Sheedy, Bidstrip (Note: One goal by West Perth kicked off the ground from a pack did not have the scorer identified.)
Western, Owens, Brentnall, Duffy, Sparrow, Allen, Thomas	Best	Boyd, Gosnells, Wimbridge, Clark, Fry, Blundell
East Perth win their fourth consecutive premiership: in a match dominated by a swirling wind their win was more convincing than the scores suggested.
