= 1917 WAFL season =

Australian rules football season

- Teams: 7
- Premiers: South Fremantle; 2nd premiership
- Minor premiers: East Fremantle; 12th minor premiership
- Matches played: 46

The 1917 WAFL season was the 33rd season of the West Australian Football League.

== Ladder ==
1917 ladder
Pos	Team	Pld	W	L	D	PF	PA	PP	Pts
1	East Fremantle	12	10	2	0	1035	454	228.0	40
2	South Fremantle (P)	12	10	2	0	872	520	167.7	40
3	Perth	12	8	4	0	783	571	137.1	32
4	Subiaco	12	6	5	1	710	555	127.9	26
5	East Perth	12	4	8	0	546	813	67.2	16
6	West Perth	12	3	8	1	562	716	78.5	14
7	Midland Junction	12	0	12	0	364	1243	29.3	0

Source: WAFL Footy Facts
Rules for classification: 1) points; 2) percentage; 3) number of points for.
(P) Premiers

== Grand Final ==
1917 WAFL Grand Final
Saturday, 15 September (12:00 pm)	East Fremantle	def. by	South Fremantle	W.A.C.A
0.0 (0); 2.3 (15); 2.3 (15); 3.8 (26)	Q1; Q2; Q3; Final	3.3 (21); 3.3 (21); 5.5 (35); 6.5 (41)	Umpires: Craig
