= 1920 WAFL season =

Australian rules football season

- Teams: 6
- Premiers: East Perth; 2nd premiership
- Minor premiers: East Perth; 3rd minor premiership
- Matches played: 48

The 1920 WAFL season was the 36th season of the West Australian Football League.

== Ladder ==
1920 ladder
Pos	Team	Pld	W	L	D	PF	PA	PP	Pts
1	East Perth (P)	15	9	6	0	759	573	132.5	36
2	East Fremantle	15	9	6	0	931	762	122.2	36
3	Perth	15	9	6	0	856	863	99.2	36
4	Subiaco	15	7	7	1	743	713	104.2	30
5	West Perth	15	7	7	1	717	913	78.5	30
6	South Fremantle	15	3	12	0	661	843	78.4	12

Source: WAFL Footy Facts
Rules for classification: 1) points; 2) percentage; 3) number of points for.
(P) Premiers

== Grand Final ==
1920 WAFL Grand Final
Saturday, 25 September (12:00 pm)	East Perth	def.	East Fremantle	W.A.C.A (crowd: 12,000)
1.8 (14); 2.11 (23); 4.16 (40); 6.16 (52)	Q1; Q2; Q3; Final	1.1 (7); 3.5 (23); 4.5 (29); 4.6 (30)
