= 1957 WANFL season =

Australian rules football season

- Teams: 8
- Premiers: East Fremantle; 22nd premiership
- Minor premiers: East Perth; 10th minor premiership
- Matches played: 88

The 1957 WANFL season was the 73rd season of senior football in Perth, Western Australia.

== Ladder ==
1957 ladder
Pos	Team	Pld	W	L	D	PF	PA	PP	Pts
1	East Perth	21	17	4	0	1842	1351	136.3	68
2	Perth	21	15	6	0	1874	1583	118.4	60
3	East Fremantle (P)	21	15	6	0	1938	1660	116.7	60
4	West Perth	21	12	8	1	1919	1780	107.8	50
5	South Fremantle	21	9	11	1	1723	1823	94.5	38
6	Subiaco	21	7	14	0	1720	1917	89.7	28
7	Claremont	21	4	17	0	1610	2052	78.5	16
8	Swan Districts	21	4	17	0	1556	2016	77.2	16

Source: WAFL Footy Facts
Rules for classification: 1) points; 2) percentage; 3) number of points for.
(P) Premiers

== Grand final ==
1957 WANFL Grand Final
Saturday, 12 October (12:00 pm)	East Perth	def. by	East Fremantle	Subiaco Oval (crowd: 38,021)
1.4; 6.7; 7.7; 9.8 (62)	Q1; Q2; Q3; Final	2.6; 2.7; 7.15; 10.18 (78)	Umpires: C. Fitzpatrick; Simpson Medal: Frank Conway (East Fremantle)
