= 1965 WANFL season =

Australian rules football season

- Teams: 8
- Premiers: East Fremantle; 23rd premiership
- Minor premiers: Swan Districts; 2nd minor premiership
- Matches played: 88

The 1965 WANFL season was the 81st season of the various incarnations of the Western Australian National Football League.

== Ladder ==
1965 ladder
Pos	Team	Pld	W	L	D	PF	PA	PP	Pts
1	Swan Districts	21	15	6	0	2159	1665	129.7	60
2	Claremont	21	12	8	1	1918	1665	115.2	50
3	West Perth	21	12	9	0	1767	1704	103.7	48
4	East Fremantle (P)	21	11	10	0	1810	1873	96.6	44
5	Perth	21	10	11	0	1821	1778	102.4	40
6	East Perth	21	10	11	0	1718	1961	87.6	40
7	Subiaco	21	8	13	0	1782	1964	90.7	32
8	South Fremantle	21	5	15	1	1644	2009	81.8	22

Source: WAFL Footy Facts
Rules for classification: 1) points; 2) percentage; 3) number of points for.
(P) Premiers

== Finals ==
=== Grand Final ===
1965 WANFL Grand Final
Saturday, 9 October	Swan Districts	def. by	East Fremantle	Subiaco Oval (crowd: 46,744)	Source
5.1; 11.3; 14.5; 16.6 (102)	Q1; Q2; Q3; Final	2.6; 5.9; 9.14; 18.18 (126)	Umpires: F. Woods; Simpson Medal: Dave Imrie (East Fremantle)
