= 1919 WAFL season =

Australian rules football season

- Teams: 6
- Premiers: East Perth; 1st premiership
- Minor premiers: East Perth; 2nd minor premiership
- Matches played: 49

The 1919 WAFL season was the 35th season of the West Australian Football League.

== Ladder ==
1919 ladder
| Pos | Team | Pld | W | L | D | PF | PA | PP | Pts |
|---|---|---|---|---|---|---|---|---|---|
| 1 | East Perth (P) | 15 | 13 | 2 | 0 | 999 | 618 | 161.7 | 52 |
| 2 | East Fremantle | 15 | 12 | 3 | 0 | 1240 | 725 | 171.0 | 48 |
| 3 | South Fremantle | 15 | 8 | 7 | 0 | 891 | 976 | 91.3 | 32 |
| 4 | Subiaco | 15 | 6 | 9 | 0 | 838 | 869 | 96.4 | 24 |
| 5 | Perth | 15 | 3 | 12 | 0 | 717 | 1023 | 70.1 | 12 |
| 6 | West Perth | 15 | 3 | 12 | 0 | 595 | 1069 | 55.7 | 12 |

Source: WAFL Footy Facts
Rules for classification: 1) points; 2) percentage; 3) number of points for.
(P) Premiers

== Grand Final ==
1919 WAFL Grand Final
Saturday, 20 September (12:00 pm) | East Perth | def. | East Fremantle | W.A.C.A (crowd: 7,000)
3.0 (18); 6.4 (40); 8.5 (53); 10.8 (68) | Q1; Q2; Q3; Final | 1.1 (7); 3.2 (20); 4.3 (27); 7.4 (46) | Umpires: Cooper
