= 1890 WAFA season =

West Australian Football League season

- Premiers: Fremantle; 4th premiership
- Leading goalkicker: Paddy Roachock (Fre)
- Matches played: 14

The 1890 WAFA season was the 6th season of senior Australian rules football in Perth, Western Australia. The Unions Football Club changed its name to "Fremantle Football Club" in April 1890 to better represent the locality in which they were based. They also won their fourth premiership of a four-peat this season.

== Clubs ==
| Colours | Club | Captain | Leading goalkicker |
|---|---|---|---|
| | Fremantle | Paddy Knox | Paddy Roachock (10) |
| | Metropolitan | F. McDonough / Jack Kneale | Delaney / Peters (3) |
| | Rovers | J. Scrymgour | Davis / Wilkinson (3) |

== Home-and-away season ==
In 1890, the WAFA competition consisted of three teams with only two venues, The Esplanade Reserve and Fremantle Oval being used to host matches.

=== Round 1 ===
| | Round 1 |
| Saturday, 31 May 1890 | Fremantle 4.4 | def. | Rovers 2.7 | Fremantle Oval |
Both sides struggled to field a full team – “The Rovers mustered about 10 of their picked men and with the aid of emergencies picked up on the field, managed to make their number up to 17. The Fremantle had a full side, but they also were compelled to solicit the aid of four or five substitutes.“

=== Round 2 ===
| | Round 2 |
| Saturday, 14 Jun 1890 | Metropolitan 0.6 | def. by | Fremantle 1.6 | The Esplanade |
Again both sides struggled to field a full team – “The Mets did not have a full team, but succeeded in getting 18 of their men together. Of the Fremantle, through a chain of unexpected circumstances, only six of their selected men put in an appearance, but they managed to put 17 men into the field.“; The crowd encroached on the playing arena and interfered with Fremantle’s play – “At one portion of the play there were more spectators inside than outside of the flags, and many times they seriously interfered with the visitors. Knox, who appears to be their bête-noir, receiving most of their attentions. Several times when kicking for goal, was he hindered by the barrackers throwing their hats on the ball.”

=== Round 3 ===
| | Round 3 |
| Saturday, 21 Jun 1890 | Rovers 3.8 | def. | Fremantle 1.3 | The Esplanade |
Following the disturbances of the previous week, the Commissioner of Police sent troopers to keep order and “many expressions of gratitude were heard from the onlookers.”

=== Round 4 ===
| | Round 4 |
| Saturday, 5 Jul 1890 | Rovers 0.0 | drew with | Metropolitan 0.0 | The Esplanade |
Strong wind and rain prevented any scoring

=== Round 5 ===
| | Round 5 |
| Saturday, 12 Jul 1890 | Fremantle 4.10 | def. | Rovers 1.2 | Fremantle Oval |

=== Round 6 ===
| | Round 6 |
| Saturday, 26 Jul 1890 | Rovers 2.13 | def. | Metropolitan 1.1 | The Esplanade |
Match played in a continual downpour

=== Round 7 ===
| | Round 7 |
| Saturday, 2 Aug 1890 | Rovers 3.2 | def. | Fremantle 2.9 | The Esplanade |
Fremantle were unable to convert their attacking play into goals and lost despite having twice as many scoring shots

=== Round 8 ===
| | Round 8 |
| Saturday, 9 Aug 1890 | Fremantle 8.20 | def. | Metropolitan 0.0 | Fremantle Oval |
Fremantle totally dominated the game, with Metropolitan playing two men short; The Metropolitan team “retired” from the contest two minutes before time

=== Round 9 ===
| | Round 9 |
| Saturday, 16 Aug 1890 | Rovers 3.2 | drew with | Metropolitan 3.4 | The Esplanade |
After head count at half-time showed the Metropolitan team had been playing with 21 men, their score of 2 goals 3 behinds was annulled and they commenced the second half two goals behind their opponents

=== Round 10 ===
| | Round 10 |
| Saturday, 23 Aug 1890 | Fremantle 8.13 | def. | Rovers 3.3 | Fremantle Oval |
Fremantle established an early lead and were never threatened; ”Juvenile larrakins” abused and struck some of the visiting Rovers players

=== Round 11 ===
| | Round 11 |
| Saturday, 30 Aug 1890 | Metropolitan 5.? | def. | Fremantle 4.? | The Esplanade |
A couple of players came to blows – conduct that was reported as “greatly regretted”

=== Round 12 ===
| | Round 12 |
| Saturday, 6 Sep 1890 | Metropolitan 2.? | def. | Rovers 0.? | The Esplanade |
A stiff breeze across the ground generally favoured the river end but made scoring difficult; Match reports indicate both sides scored multiple behinds but no exact scores are given

=== Round 13 ===
| | Round 13 |
| Saturday, 13 Sep 1890 | Fremantle 4.15 | def. | Metropolitan 3.5 | Fremantle Oval |
This match was originally scheduled for 28 Jun 1890 but was postponed at the request Fremantle Rowing Club who scheduled a regatta to mark Coronation Day (52nd anniversary of Queen Victoria’s coronation)

=== Abandoned Round ===
On 20 September 1890 a match was scheduled to be played between Rovers and Metropolitan, however due to a scheduling clash two junior clubs had commenced playing on the ground and the match did not take place.

=== Round 14 ===
| | Round 14 |
| Saturday, 27 Sep 1890 | Metropolitan 6 | def. | Fremantle 2 | The Esplanade |
Match reports do not mention any behinds being scored

== Ladder ==
1890 ladder
| Pos | Team | Pld | W | L | D | GF | GA | GD | Pts |
|---|---|---|---|---|---|---|---|---|---|
| 1 | Fremantle (P) | 10 | 6 | 4 | 0 | 38 | 26 | +12 | 12 |
| 2 | Metropolitans | 9 | 3 | 4 | 2 | 20 | 24 | −4 | 8 |
| 3 | Rovers | 9 | 3 | 4 | 2 | 17 | 25 | −8 | 8 |

Source: WAFL Footy Facts
Rules for classification: 1) points; 2) percentage; 3) number of points for.
(P) Premiers
