= 1958 WANFL season =

Australian rules football season

- Teams: 8
- Premiers: East Perth; 11th premiership
- Minor premiers: East Fremantle; 27th minor premiership
- Matches played: 88

The 1958 WANFL season was the 74th season of senior football in Perth, Western Australia.

== Ladder ==
1958 ladder
Pos	Team	Pld	W	L	D	PF	PA	PP	Pts
1	East Fremantle	21	17	4	0	2102	1616	130.1	68
2	East Perth (P)	21	16	5	0	2361	1724	136.9	64
3	West Perth	21	14	7	0	2217	1838	120.6	56
4	Perth	21	11	10	0	1838	1768	104.0	44
5	Subiaco	21	10	11	0	1850	1794	103.1	40
6	South Fremantle	21	8	13	0	2016	1968	102.4	32
7	Swan Districts	21	6	15	0	1605	2091	76.8	24
8	Claremont	21	2	19	0	1423	2613	54.5	8

Source: WAFL Footy Facts
Rules for classification: 1) points; 2) percentage; 3) number of points for.
(P) Premiers

== Grand final ==
1958 WANFL Grand Final
Saturday, 11 October (12:00 pm)	East Fremantle	def. by	East Perth	Subiaco Oval (crowd: 36,668)
0.4; 5.9; 6.10; 8.15 (63)	Q1; Q2; Q3; Final	3.7; 5.8; 8.15; 8.17 (65)	Umpires: Len Gardner; Simpson Medal: Ned Bull (East Perth)
