= 1955 WANFL season =

Australian rules football season

- Teams: 8
- Premiers: Perth; 2nd premiership
- Minor premiers: South Fremantle; 8th minor premiership
- Matches played: 84

The 1955 WANFL season was the 71st season of senior football in Perth, Western Australia.

== Ladder ==
1955 ladder
Pos	Team	Pld	W	L	D	PF	PA	PP	Pts
1	South Fremantle	20	16	4	0	2314	1581	146.4	64
2	East Fremantle	20	16	4	0	2015	1479	136.2	64
3	Perth (P)	20	14	6	0	1774	1438	123.4	56
4	West Perth	20	13	7	0	1914	1656	115.6	52
5	East Perth	20	7	13	0	1862	1913	97.3	28
6	Swan Districts	20	5	15	0	1446	1951	74.1	20
7	Claremont	20	5	15	0	1390	2022	68.7	20
8	Subiaco	20	4	16	0	1501	2176	69.0	16

Source: WAFL Footy Facts
Rules for classification: 1) points; 2) percentage; 3) number of points for.
(P) Premiers

== Grand final ==
1955 WANFL Grand Final
Saturday, 8 October (12:00 pm)	East Fremantle	def. by	Perth	Subiaco Oval (crowd: 41,659)
1.0; 8.5; 8.6; 11.9 (75)	Q1; Q2; Q3; Final	2.7; 2.7; 7.10; 11.11 (77)	Umpires: J. Green; Simpson Medal: Merv McIntosh (Perth)
