= 1900 WAFA season =

Western Australian football season

- Teams: 4
- Premiers: East Fremantle; 1st premiership
- Minor premiers: East Fremantle; 1st minor premiership

The 1900 WAFA season was the 16th season of senior Australian rules football in Perth, Western Australia.

== Ladder ==
Pos	Team	Pld	W	L	D	PF	PA	PP	Pts
1	East Fremantle (P)	12	10	2	0	601	448	134.2	40
2	South Fremantle	12	7	5	0	464	466	99.6	28
3	West Perth	12	5	7	0	482	532	90.6	20
4	Perth	12	2	10	0	472	573	82.4	8

Source: WAFL Footy Facts
Rules for classification: 1) points; 2) percentage; 3) number of points for.
(P) Premiers
