= 1948 WANFL season =

Australian rules football season

- Teams: 8
- Premiers: South Fremantle; 4th premiership
- Minor premiers: West Perth; 6th minor premiership
- Matches played: 80

The 1948 WANFL season was the 64th season of senior football in Perth, Western Australia.

== Ladder ==
1948 ladder
Pos	Team	Pld	W	L	D	PF	PA	PP	Pts
1	West Perth	19	16	3	0	1758	1258	139.7	64
2	South Fremantle (P)	19	14	5	0	2041	1601	127.5	56
3	Perth	19	12	7	0	1665	1468	113.4	48
4	East Fremantle	19	12	7	0	1970	1764	111.7	48
5	East Perth	19	10	9	0	1528	1501	101.8	40
6	Claremont	19	5	14	0	1538	1754	87.7	20
7	Subiaco	19	5	14	0	1467	1768	83.0	20
8	Swan Districts	19	2	17	0	1207	2060	58.6	8

Source: WAFL Footy Facts
Rules for classification: 1) points; 2) percentage; 3) number of points for.
(P) Premiers

== Grand final ==
1948 WANFL Grand Final
Saturday, 9 October (12:00 pm)	West Perth	def. by	South Fremantle	Subiaco Oval (crowd: 28,660)	Source
0.5; 1.8; 7.13; 8.15 (63)	Q1; Q2; Q3; Final	3.0; 7.4; 8.7; 13.9 (87)	Umpires: A Pitsikas
