= John Dimmer (coach) =

Australian rules footballer and coach

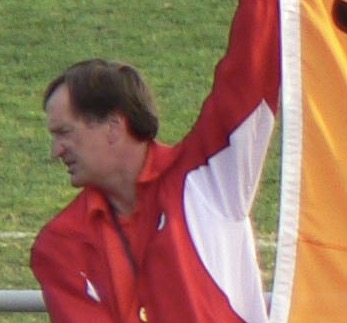
- Dimmer after South Fremantle's Grand Final win in September 2005

Personal information
- Full name: John Robert Dimmer
- Born: 19 November 1954 (age 71)
- Original team: Karrinyup/Scarborough
- Position: Centre half-back
- Other occupation: Schoolteacher

Playing career^{1}
Years	Club	Games (Goals)
1973–1979	Subiaco	90 (24)
1980–1983	East Perth	81 (29)
Total		171 (53)

Representative team honours^{2}
Years	Team	Games (Goals)
19??–19??	Western Australia	5 (Note: Some sources state he played four interstate games.) (?)

Coaching career^{3}
Years	Club	Games (W–L–D)
1995–1999	West Perth/Joondalup	111 (73–38–0)
2004–2011	South Fremantle	172 (108–64–0)
WAFL club total		283 (Note: Some sources state he coached 284 WAFL games, and therefore 286 games overall.) (181–102–0)
1996; 2010	Representative; WAFL	2 (0–2–0)
Total		285 (181–104–0)
- ^{1} Playing statistics correct to the end of 1983.^{2} Representative statistics correct as of 1983.^{3} Coaching statistics correct as of 2011.

Career highlights
- East Perth captain: 1983; WAFL premiership player: 1973; 4× WAFL premiership coach: 1995, 1999, 2005, 2009; JJ Leonard Medal: 1994; 2× WA Media Guild Coach of the Year: 1999, 2009; AFLCA Lifetime Achievement Award: 2017; Australian Sports Medal: 2000

John Robert Dimmer (born 19 November 1954) is a former Australian rules football coach and player from Western Australia. He spent the majority of his playing and coaching careers in the West Australian Football League (WAFL), winning one premiership in the league as a player and four as a coach. He retired from state‐league coaching at the end of the 2011 season, during which he had coached the South Fremantle Football Club.

== Playing career ==
Dimmer played as a centre half-back, first playing WAFL reserves–grade football in 1972 for Subiaco. After winning a reserves premiership with the team, he began playing senior football the following season. That year, he won the only senior WAFL premiership of his playing career in a 32-point win over West Perth.

He continued to play for Subiaco until 1979, when he left to East Perth having scored 24 goals in his 90 Lions games. At his new club, he continued to play regular senior football, making 81 appearances from 1980 to 1983. He captained the team in his final season as they achieved a fifth-place finish.

During his WAFL career, he represented Western Australia five times in interstate matches, one of which was a State of Origin game.

== Coaching career ==
After stints with junior and school teams, he joined Claremont's coaching staff in 1987, remaining there until 1993. During his time there, he coached the reserves team to two premierships. In 1994, he coached the West Coast Amateur Football Club, winning the WAAFL A Grade premiership and receiving the JJ Leonard Medal as a personal achievement.

The following year, he was appointed head coach of West Perth, leading them to a WAFL premiership in his first year. He continued coaching the Falcons until the end of the 1999 season, during which he led them to a second Grand Final win, defeating South Fremantle in the third year in which the competition was known as "Westar Rules".

In the 2000 season, Dimmer worked as an assistant coach to Damian Drum at Fremantle in the AFL, before returning to the WAFL as West Perth's director of coaching in 2002 and 2003.

In 2004, he began coaching South Fremantle, leading them to a premiership the following year in a convincing Grand Final win over Claremont after finishing second during the home-and-away season. In 2009, he won the fourth and last premiership of his career, ending Subiaco's run of three consecutive flags.

In 2011, he retired from coaching to focus on a teaching job at Christ Church Grammar School, also coaching the school's first XVIII football team.

Outside of club coaching, he led the WAFL representative side in matches in 1996 and 2010.

== Legacy ==
Dimmer was awarded an Australian Sports Medal on 24 October 2000 for service to Australian rules football. He received life membership of the South Fremantle Football Club in 2016, and the same honour in 2018 of the West Australian Football Commission. In 2017, he received the AFL Coaches Association's Lifetime Achievement Award, which recognises "an individual who has made an outstanding contribution" to the sport of Australian rules football.
