= 1960 WANFL season =

Australian rules football season

- Teams: 8
- Premiers: West Perth; 12th premiership
- Minor premiers: West Perth; 7th minor premiership
- Matches played: 88

The 1960 WANFL season was the 76th season of the various incarnations of the Western Australian National Football League.

== Ladder ==
1960 ladder
Pos	Team	Pld	W	L	D	PF	PA	PP	Pts
1	West Perth (P)	21	13	5	3	2053	1712	119.9	58
2	East Perth	21	13	6	2	2290	1745	131.2	56
3	South Fremantle	21	13	6	2	2147	1903	112.8	56
4	East Fremantle	21	13	8	0	2101	1731	121.4	52
5	Subiaco	21	12	9	0	2052	1930	106.3	48
6	Claremont	21	8	13	0	1870	2304	81.2	32
7	Perth	21	6	14	1	1582	2025	78.1	26
8	Swan Districts	21	2	19	0	1563	2308	67.7	8

Source: WAFL Footy Facts
Rules for classification: 1) points; 2) percentage; 3) number of points for.
(P) Premiers

== Finals ==
=== Grand Final ===
1960 WANFL Grand Final
Saturday, 8 October	West Perth	def.	East Perth	Subiaco Oval (crowd: 42,850)	Source
3.1; 11.8; 13.9; 17.13 (115)	Q1; Q2; Q3; Final	5.3; 6.5; 10.10; 12.11 (83)	Umpires: Len Gardner; Simpson Medal: Brian Foley (West Perth)
