= 1956 WANFL season =

Australian rules football season

- Teams: 8
- Premiers: East Perth; 10th premiership
- Minor premiers: East Perth; 9th minor premiership
- Matches played: 80

The 1956 WANFL season was the 72nd season of senior football in Perth, Western Australia.

== Ladder ==
1956 ladder
Pos	Team	Pld	W	L	D	PF	PA	PP	Pts
1	East Perth (P)	19	14	5	0	1751	1453	120.5	56
2	South Fremantle	19	13	6	0	1780	1650	107.9	52
3	East Fremantle	19	12	7	0	1581	1366	115.7	48
4	Perth	19	11	8	0	1609	1499	107.3	44
5	West Perth	19	8	11	0	1529	1531	99.9	32
6	Claremont	19	8	11	0	1569	1824	86.0	32
7	Subiaco	19	6	13	0	1519	1705	89.1	24
8	Swan Districts	19	4	15	0	1567	1877	83.5	16

Source: WAFL Footy Facts
Rules for classification: 1) points; 2) percentage; 3) number of points for.
(P) Premiers

== Grand final ==
1956 WANFL Grand Final
Saturday, 13 October (12:00 pm)	East Perth	def.	South Fremantle	Subiaco Oval (crowd: 34,959)
1.3; 6.10; 9.14; 10.17 (77)	Q1; Q2; Q3; Final	3.0; 4.1; 5.5; 9.10 (64)	Umpires: Len Gardner; Simpson Medal: Tony Parentich (South Fremantle)
