= 1962 WANFL season =

Australian rules football season

- Teams: 8
- Premiers: Swan Districts; 2nd premiership
- Minor premiers: Swan Districts; 1st minor premiership
- Matches played: 88

The 1962 WANFL season was the 78th season of the various incarnations of the Western Australian National Football League.

== Home-and-away season ==
=== Round 1 ===
	Round 1
Saturday, 7 April	Perth 14.13 (97)	def.	South Fremantle 13.9 (87)	Lathlain Park (crowd: 7,913)
Saturday, 7 April	Subiaco 7.11 (53)	def. by	East Perth 15.14 (104)	Subiaco Oval (crowd: 9,117)
Saturday, 7 April	West Perth 9.14 (68)	def.	Claremont 5.7 (37)	Leederville Oval (crowd: 7,834)
Saturday, 7 April	East Fremantle 13.9 (87)	def.	Swan Districts 12.10 (82)	Fremantle Oval (crowd: 8,327)

== Ladder ==
1962 ladder
Pos	Team	Pld	W	L	D	PF	PA	PP	Pts
1	Swan Districts (P)	21	14	7	0	2043	1693	120.7	56
2	East Fremantle	21	13	7	1	1721	1709	100.7	54
3	South Fremantle	21	12	9	0	1906	1762	108.2	48
4	West Perth	21	12	9	0	1693	1631	103.8	48
5	East Perth	21	11	10	0	1898	1596	118.9	44
6	Perth	21	9	12	0	1733	1837	94.3	36
7	Subiaco	21	8	12	1	1821	2026	89.9	34
8	Claremont	21	4	17	0	1490	2051	72.6	16

Source: WAFL Footy Facts
Rules for classification: 1) points; 2) percentage; 3) number of points for.
(P) Premiers

== Finals ==
=== Grand Final ===
1962 WANFL Grand Final
Saturday, 6 October	Swan Districts	def.	East Fremantle	Subiaco Oval (crowd: 46,659)
7.2; 10.5; 13.8; 14.10 (94)	Q1; Q2; Q3; Final	1.2; 3.10; 5.14; 10.16 (76)	Umpires: B. Feld; Simpson Medal: Ray Sorrell (East Fremantle)
