= Poss Watson =

Australian rules footballer

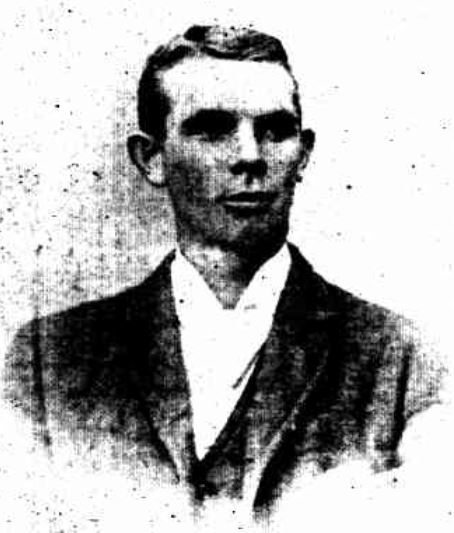

Personal information
- Full name: William Wright Watson
- Nicknames: Poss, Possum
- Born: 25 August 1868; Warrnambool, Victoria
- Died: 20 August 1950 (aged 81); Dalkeith, Western Australia
- Original team: Warrnambool

Playing career
Years	Club	Games (Goals)
1891–1894	Essendon	69 (29)
1895–1898	Fremantle	58
1899	Perth	9

Career highlights
- VFA premierships: 1891, 1892, 1893, 1894; WAFA premierships: 1895, 1896, 1898; Fremantle captain: 1895 (part)–1898; Perth inaugural captain: 1899

William Wright "Poss" Watson (25 August 1868 – 20 August 1950) was an Australian rules footballer who played with Essendon in the Victorian Football Association (VFA) and Fremantle in the West Australian Football Association.

Originally from Warrnambool, Watson played alongside Albert Thurgood in Essendon's four consecutive VFA premierships between 1891 and 1894, before getting married and moving to Western Australia (with Thurgood) to play for Fremantle, captaining the team and winning three more premierships in the next four years. He retired at the end of the 1898 season, but returned in 1899 to captain the newly formed Perth Football Club when they were admitted to the league mid-season.
