= 1949 WANFL season =

Season of the WAFL

- Teams: 8
- Premiers: West Perth; 10th premiership
- Minor premiers: Perth; 1st minor premiership
- Matches played: 76

The 1949 WANFL season was the 65th season of senior football in Perth, Western Australia.

== Ladder ==
1949 ladder
Pos	Team	Pld	W	L	D	PF	PA	PP	Pts
1	Perth	18	14	4	0	1677	1195	140.3	56
2	West Perth (P)	18	13	5	0	1629	1283	127.0	52
3	South Fremantle	18	13	5	0	1819	1559	116.7	52
4	East Fremantle	18	11	7	0	1889	1669	113.2	44
5	East Perth	18	9	9	0	1470	1511	97.3	36
6	Claremont	18	6	12	0	1359	1682	80.8	24
7	Swan Districts	18	4	14	0	1273	1629	78.1	16
8	Subiaco	18	2	16	0	1256	1844	68.1	8

Source: WAFL Footy Facts
Rules for classification: 1) points; 2) percentage; 3) number of points for.
(P) Premiers

== Grand final ==
1949 WANFL Grand Final
Saturday, 8 October (12:00 pm)	West Perth	def.	Perth	Subiaco Oval (crowd: 34,039)
3.3; 7.4; 11.7; 16.13 (109)	Q1; Q2; Q3; Final	5.3; 8.3; 10.5; 12.7 (79)	Umpires: A Pitsikas
