= 1952 WANFL season =

Australian rules football season

- Teams: 8
- Premiers: South Fremantle; 6th premiership
- Minor premiers: South Fremantle; 6th minor premiership
- Matches played: 84

The 1952 WANFL season was the 68th season of senior football in Perth, Western Australia.

During the season, the Avon Valley Football Association applied to enter a team in the WANFL.

== Ladder ==
1952 ladder
Pos	Team	Pld	W	L	D	PF	PA	PP	Pts
1	South Fremantle (P)	20	17	3	0	2423	1298	186.7	68
2	West Perth	20	15	5	0	2271	1522	149.2	60
3	East Perth	20	13	7	0	1933	1669	115.8	52
4	Claremont	20	12	8	0	1925	1829	105.2	48
5	East Fremantle	20	12	8	0	1876	1803	104.0	48
6	Perth	20	6	14	0	1491	1946	76.6	24
7	Subiaco	20	3	17	0	1440	2120	67.9	12
8	Swan Districts	20	2	18	0	1217	2389	50.9	8

Source: WAFL Footy Facts
Rules for classification: 1) points; 2) percentage; 3) number of points for.
(P) Premiers

== Grand final ==
1952 WANFL Grand Final
Saturday, 11 October (12:00 pm)	West Perth	def. by	South Fremantle	Subiaco Oval (crowd: 29,701)
5.5; 8.6; 10.9; 10.10 (70)	Q1; Q2; Q3; Final	1.2; 3.6; 7.11; 12.19 (91)	Umpires: J Campbell
