= 1950 WANFL season =

1950 football season in Perth, Australia

- Teams: 8
- Premiers: South Fremantle; 5th premiership
- Minor premiers: South Fremantle; 4th minor premiership
- Matches played: 88

The 1950 WANFL season was the 66th season of senior football in Perth, Western Australia.

== Ladder ==
1950 ladder
Pos	Team	Pld	W	L	D	PF	PA	PP	Pts
1	South Fremantle (P)	21	19	2	0	2478	1640	151.1	76
2	West Perth	21	16	5	0	1899	1440	131.9	64
3	Perth	21	14	7	0	1902	1700	111.9	56
4	East Fremantle	21	10	11	0	2146	2095	102.4	40
5	Claremont	21	9	12	0	1717	1839	93.4	36
6	East Perth	21	6	15	0	1495	1860	80.4	24
7	Swan Districts	21	5	16	0	1436	1895	75.8	20
8	Subiaco	21	5	16	0	1276	1880	67.9	20

Source: WAFL Footy Facts
Rules for classification: 1) points; 2) percentage; 3) number of points for.
(P) Premiers

== Grand final ==
1950 WANFL Grand Final
Saturday, 14 October (12:00 pm)	South Fremantle	def.	Perth	Subiaco Oval (crowd: 31,325)
2.3; 7.12; 8.19; 12.23 (95)	Q1; Q2; Q3; Final	5.1; 6.1; 11.10; 13.11 (89)	Umpires: A Pitsikas

=== Teams ===
South Fremantle				Perth			
#	Player	G	B	#	Player	G	B
#1	Clive Lewington	2	1	#1	Mervyn Mcintosh	0	1
#2	Laurence Green	2	3	#2	Robin Sermon	2	2
#3	Donald Dixon	0	0	#3	Hervert Sykes	0	0
#4	Robert Mason	0	0	#4	Terrence Moriarty	0	0
#5	Albert Western	2	1	#5	Riley Miller	2	0
#7	Stephen Marsh	0	2	#6	Edward Davies	0	0
#8	Charlie Tyson	1	2	#7	Sydney Shaw	0	0
#9	Desmond Kelly	1	0	#8	Phillip Craven	0	0
#10	Eric Eriksson	0	0	#10	Peter Coventry	0	0
#12	Francis Treasure	0	0	#11	Frederick Wray	1	2
#14	John Reilly	0	3	#12	Reginald Zeuner	2	0
#15	John Crook	0	0	#14	Brian Wheeler	0	0
#16	Henry Carbon	1	2	#15	George Bailey	0	0
#17	David Ingraham	0	0	#17	Ronald Tucker	3	1
#19	Bernard Naylor	2	7	#18	Keith Sturtridge	2	1
#20	James Matison	0	0	#19	Keith Harper	0	0
#22	Eric Stewart	0	0	#20	Alexander Wallace	0	0
#24	Norman Smith	0	0	#21	George Atkinson	0	0
#25	Leonard Hayward	0	0	#22	Jeffrey McGann	1	0
#26	Donald Wares	1	0	#23	William Pinkerton	0	1
