= Centrals Football Club =

Former Australian rules football club

Centrals

Names
- Full name: Centrals Football Club

Club details
- Founded: 1891
- Dissolved: 1891
- Colours: black and red
- Competition: WAFA

The Centrals Football Club was an Australian rules football club in 1891.

They spent just one season as a senior club in the Western Australian Football Association, winning 2 and drawing 1 of 12 matches to finish fourth in a five team competition.
