= 1951 WANFL season =

Australian rules football season

- Teams: 8
- Premiers: West Perth; 11th premiership
- Minor premiers: South Fremantle; 5th minor premiership
- Matches played: 88

The 1951 WANFL season was the 67th season of senior football in Perth, Western Australia.

== Ladder ==
1951 ladder
Pos	Team	Pld	W	L	D	PF	PA	PP	Pts
1	South Fremantle	21	16	5	0	2244	1719	130.5	64
2	West Perth (P)	21	14	7	0	1986	1408	141.1	56
3	East Fremantle	21	14	7	0	2287	1842	124.2	56
4	Perth	21	14	7	0	1870	1835	101.9	56
5	East Perth	21	12	9	0	1815	1923	94.4	48
6	Claremont	21	9	12	0	1720	1767	97.3	36
7	Subiaco	21	4	17	0	1342	1960	68.5	16
8	Swan Districts	21	1	20	0	1450	2260	64.2	4

Source: WAFL Footy Facts
Rules for classification: 1) points; 2) percentage; 3) number of points for.
(P) Premiers

== Grand final ==
1951 WANFL Grand Final
Saturday, 13 October (12:00 pm)	South Fremantle	def. by	West Perth	Subiaco Oval (crowd: 30,006)
1.2; 5.7; 7.9; 12.13 (85)	Q1; Q2; Q3; Final	7.4; 8.5; 10.8; 13.10 (88)	Umpires: A Pitsikas

Police raided the West Perth victory celebrations at Leederville Oval, confiscating liquor and charging a club official for allegedly selling liquor.
