= Ray Montgomery (umpire) =

Personal information
- Full name: Raymond Montgomery
- Born: 1929
- Died: 1 August 2009
- Other occupation: Railway worker Art teacher

Umpiring career
Years	League	Role	Games
1952–1964	WANFL	Field umpire	
1965	VFL	Field umpire	
1966–1972	WANFL	Field umpire	

Ray Montgomery (1929 – 1 August 2009) was an Australian rules football umpire. Montgomery umpired in the West Australian National Football League (now known as the West Australian Football League) and the Victorian Football League.

== Working life ==
He began his working life as a coach builder for the Western Australian Government Railways at the Midland Railway Workshops. After going to teacher's college he became an art teacher, becoming an Arts Master at Churchlands College.

== Playing career ==
Montgomery played football at school and in the Temperance League before playing reserve grade for Swan Districts. His playing career was brought to an end by a cracked vertebra.

== Umpiring career ==
Montgomery commenced umpiring football with Metropolitan Juniors in 1949.

=== WANFL ===
Montgomery joined the WANFL umpiring panel in 1950 and was soon umpiring league football, making his debut in a match between East Fremantle and Swan Districts at Fremantle Oval in Round 4 of the 1952 season.

In 1959 Montgomery officiated in his first grand final, between East Perth and Subiaco at Subiaco Oval.

During Round 1 of the 1956 season Montgomery reported Jack Sheedy for using abusive language towards him, to which Sheedy responded at the tribunal by swearing on a bible that Montgomery had reported the wrong player. Despite the theatrics, Sheedy was found guilty of the charge.

In 1963 he made a complaint to the WANFL over an incident that occurred after he had umpired a match between East Fremantle and South Fremantle at East Fremantle Oval. He alleged that as he was walking out of the ground, a player drove a car toward him, attempting to run him over.

He retired in 1972 having umpired 308 WANFL league matches including five grand finals.

=== VFL ===
While studying art at the Melbourne Technical College Montgomery umpired two league matches during the 1965 Victorian Football League season.

== Later life and legacy ==
Montgomery was responsible for redesigning the Swan Districts logo after Swans coach Haydn Bunton, Jr. suggested it needed livening up.

After retiring Montgomery took up bowls and was a member of the Manning Bowls Club for over three decades.

The award for best WAFL field umpire is named the Ray Montgomery Medal in his honour.

In 2002 Montgomery was named as one of three field umpires in the WANFL Umpires Association Team of the Half Century.

In 2004 he was inducted into the West Australian Football Hall of Fame.
