= Imperials Football Club =

Former WAFA Australian rules football club

Imperials

Names
- Full name: Imperials Football Club
- Nickname(s): Blue and whites

Club details
- Founded: 1892
- Dissolved: 1897
- Colours: blue and white
- Competition: West Australian Junior Football Association (1892–94); West Australian Football Association (1895–97)
- Premierships: WAJFA: 1 (1892); WAFA: 0

The Imperials Football Club was an Australian rules football club based in Fremantle, Western Australia. Formed in 1892, the club competed in the West Australian Junior Football Association for three seasons from 1892 to 1894, and was admitted to the senior West Australian Football Association in 1895.

== History ==
The club is first mentioned in the fixtures for the 1892 junior football season, but it may have been formed before then. The last published premiership tables, produced in The West Australian on 27 September 1892, had Imperials first on 14 points, having won seven and lost one of their eight games. Imperials were admitted into the senior competition, the West Australian Football Association (WAFA), for the 1895 season. The club finished second-last in its debut season, ahead of West Perth, but were able to finish runner-up to Fremantle in 1896. The club disbanded at the end of the 1897 season, finishing with the success rate of 41.7%.

== Foundation of East Fremantle ==
The club disbanded at the conclusion of the 1897 season, with many of its players and administrators forming the bulk of the East Fremantle Football Club, which was established the next season. A number of the club's players played with the newly formed East Fremantle, which was established before the 1898 season. Notable players included David Christy, Wally Watts, Tommy O'Dea, and Tom Wilson.
