= East Perth Football Club (1891) =

East Perth (1891)

Names
- Full name: East Perth Football Club

Club details
- Founded: 1891
- Dissolved: 1892
- Colours: blue and white
- Competition: WAFA

The East Perth Football Club was an Australian rules football club, who was known as the original East Perth Football Club from 1891 before the East Perth from today was formed. The original East Perth club's record was far from illustrious, involving a mere two season stint (1891 and 1892) as members of the Western Australian Football Association, during which they managed just 1 win and 2 draws from a total of 24 matches, for a success rate of 8.3%.
