= North Fremantle Football Club =

North Fremantle

Names
- Full name: North Fremantle Football Club
- Nickname: Magpies

Club details
- Founded: 19th century
- Colours: blue, red and white (1901-02) black and white (1903-2023)
- Competition: West Australian Football Association (1901-15) amateur League (1915-2023)
- Coach: Arthur Maskos
- Ground: North Fremantle Oval and Gilbert Fraser Reserve

The North Fremantle Football Club was an Australian rules football club which competed in the West Australian Football League from 1901 to 1915. They currently compete in multiple grades across the Perth Football League and have 4 senior men’s teams, two colts teams and two women’s teams. They play home games at Gilbert Fraser Reserve and are the oldest club still playing amateur football.

North Fremantle started out in the First Rate Junior Association, the state's second tier competition. They were premiers in 1897 and four years later were admitted, along with Subiaco, into the Western Australian Football Association (later renamed the West Australian Football League).

In preparation for their inaugural WAFA season, North Fremantle signed three East Fremantle players who had been members of the 1900 premiership side.

Briefly in 1902, North sat on top of the WAFA ladder after beating East Fremantle by 22 points in their local derby. They however never made it to a Grand Final in the league, despite winning more games than they lost in their initial seasons.

The club suffered because of war and in 1915 they, due to lack of players, went into 'voluntary recession'. Fremantle were no longer able to support a third club and North, not helped by winning just two of their last 35 league matches, left the league.

Notable footballers to play for the club include Bill Bushell, Bill Goddard, Sam Gravenall and Phillip Matson.
