= List of Australian rules football clubs in Western Australia =

This is a list of clubs that play Australian rules football in Western Australia at the senior level.

== National Level ==
=== Australian Football League ===
Club	Colours	Nickname	Home ground	Former League	Est.	Years in AFL	Premierships	
Club	Colours	Nickname	Home ground	Former League	Est.	Years in AFL	Total	Most Recent
Fremantle		Dockers	Perth Stadium, Burswood	–	1994	1995–	0	–
West Coast		Eagles	Perth Stadium, Burswood	–	1986	1987–	4	2018

== State Level ==
=== West Australian Football League ===
Club	Colours	Nickname	Home ground	Former League	Est.	Years in WAFL	Premierships	
Club	Colours	Nickname	Home ground	Former League	Est.	Years in WAFL	Total	Most Recent
Claremont (Note: Known as Claremont-Cottesloe from 1926 to 1934.)		Tigers	Claremont Oval, Claremont (Note: Claremont played at the Claremont Showground from 1925 to 1927 and again from 2014 until 2016 when Claremont Oval was closed for re-development, and at Subiaco Oval from 1945 to 1947 when Claremont Oval was being rebuilt after a grandstand fire in 1944. Claremont were known as Claremont-Cottesloe between 1926 and 1934.)	WAFA	1906	1926*	12	2012
East Fremantle		Sharks	East Fremantle Oval, East Fremantle (Note: East Fremantle played at Fremantle Oval from 1898 to 1952, excluding a period in 1906 where home games were played at East Fremantle Oval; and at the WACA Ground (in 2022 and 2023), Fremantle Oval (2024) and Claremont Oval (2024) whilst East Fremantle Oval is re-developed.)	–	1898	1898–	30	2023
East Perth		Royals	Leederville Oval, Leederville (Note: East Perth played at Wellington Square from 1902 to 1909, at Perth Oval from 1910, to 1987 and from 1990 to 1999, and at the WACA Ground during 1988 and 1989. East Perth were aligned with West Coast between 2014 and 2018.)	PFRJA	1906	1906–	17	2002
Peel (Note: Peel have been aligned with Fremantle since 2014.) (Note: The club is the reserves team of a senior club of the Australian Football League.)		Thunder	Rushton Park, Mandurah	–	1996	1997–	3	2024
Perth (Note: Known as Victoria Park]] from 1934 to 1935.)		Demons	Lathlain Park, Lathlain (Note: Perth played at the WACA Ground from 1899 to 1958 and during 1987 and 1988.)	PFRJA	1899	1899–	7	1977
South Fremantle		Bulldogs	Fremantle Oval, Fremantle	–	1900	1900–	15	2025
Subiaco		Lions	Leederville Oval, Leederville (Note: Subiaco played at Shenton Park between 1901 and 1905, at Mueller Park in 1906 and 1907, and at Subiaco Oval from 1908 to 2003.)	PFRJA	1896	1901–	16	2021
Swan Districts		Swans	Bassendean Oval, Bassendean	–	1934	1934–	8	2010
West Coast (Note: The club is the affiliation team of a senior club of the Australian Football League)		Eagles	Lathlain Park, Lathlain (Note: West Coast mainly play away games and often sell their home matches to other clubs. When they do play home games, they are held at their training base at Lathlain Park.)	–	2019	2019–	0	–
West Perth		Falcons	Arena Joondalup, Joondalup (Note: West Perth played at Leederville Oval from 1915 to 1993.)	–	1891	1891–	20	2022

== Metropolitan leagues ==
=== Perth Football League ===
Club	Colours	Nickname	Home Ground	Former League	Est.	Years in PFL	PFL Senior Premierships	
Club	Colours	Nickname	Home Ground	Former League	Est.	Years in PFL	Total	Most Recent
Armadale		Demons	Gwynne Park, Armadale	PFL	1909	2010–	0	–
Baldivis		Brumbies	Baldivis Sports Complex, Baldivis	PFL	2005	2021–	1	2021
Ballajura		Royals	Kingfisher Oval, Ballajura	WAFA	1995	2002–	3	2023
Bassendean (Ashfield 1973–77, Ashfield-Bassendean 1978–82)		Swans	Jubilee Reserve, Eden Hill	–	1973	1973–	5	2019
Bayswater		Blues	Hillcrest Reserve, Bayswater	WAFA	1946	1946–2004, 2009–	5	1988
Belmont Districts (Belmont-Redcliffe 1999–2004)		Bombers	Forster Park, Cloverdale	–	1999	1999–	4	2023
Brentwood Booragoon (Booragoon 1978–2005)		Bulldogs	Karoonda Park, Booragoon	–	1978	1978–	2	2022
Bullcreek Leeming (Bullcreek 1980–93)		Bombers	Beasley Park, Leeming	–	1980	1980–	7	2012
Canning South Perth (Canning-Victoria Park-South Perth 2009–13)		Tigers	Wyong Reserve, Bentley	SFL	2001	2009–	2	2025
Canning Vale		Cougars	Clifton Reserve, Canning Vale	–	2011	2011–	2	2012
Carlisle		Cougars	Carlisle Reserve, Carlisle	–	1962	1962–	6	2013
Cockburn Cobras (Cockburn 2012–20)		Cobras	Davilak Reserve, Hamilton Hill	MFL	1993	2012–	1	2019
Cockburn Lakes (Robbs Jetty 1980–83)		Warriors	Anning Park, South Lake	WAFA	1980	1980–2003, 2005–	11	2022
Collegians (Collegians-Old Scotch 1984–94)		Collies	David Cruickshank Reserve, Dalkeith	–	1961	1961–	11	2010
Coolbellup		Cats	Tempest Park, Coolbellup	–	1975	1975–	3	2025
Coolbinia (Coolbinia-West Perth 2003–18)		Falcons	Yokine Reserve, Yokine	–	2003	2003–	2	2018
Cottesloe		Roosters	Cottesloe Oval, Cottesloe	–	2014	2014–	0	–
Curtin University Wesley (Wesley Curtin 1990–2015)		Tigers	Curtin University South Oval, Bentley	–	1990	1990–	6	2023
Dianella Morley		Raiders	Dianella Regional Open Space, Dianella	–	1991	1991–	3	2017
East Fremantle (Winnacott 2020–24)		Eagles	Winnacott Reserve, Willagee	FESFA	1921	1939–1959, 1980–	5	2000
Ellenbrook		Eels	Ellenbrook District Open Space, Ellenbrook	WAFA	2002	2007–	0	–
Forrestdale		Falcons	William Skeet Oval, Forrestdale	WAFA	1993	1993–1998, 2009–	3	2024
Forrestfield		Rhinos	John Reid Oval, Forrestfield	HFA	2013	2015–	0	–
Fremantle C.B.C			Morris Buzacott Reserve, Kardinya	–	1933	1933–	7	2022
Gosnells		Hawks	Gosnells Oval, Gosnells	SFL	1914	1931–1933, 2009–	2	2024
Hamersley Carine (Hamersley 1974–89)		Hawks	Carine Regional Open Space, Carine	–	1974	1974–	9	2022
Hammond Park		Hurricanes	Botany Park, Hammond Park	–	2008	2025–	0	–
High Wycombe		Bulldogs	Scott Reserve, High Wycombe	–	1992	1992–	5	2021
Hills Rangers		Rangers	Sawyers Valley Oval, Sawyers Valley	–	2018	2018–2022, 2024–	0	–
Jandakot		Jets	Atwell Reserve, Atwell	MFL	2009	2011–	3	2020
Joondalup (ECU Jets 2016–24)		Jets	Emerald Park, Edgewater	–	2016	2016–	0	–
Kalamunda		Cougars	Ray Owen Reserve, Lesmurdie	SFL	1965	2001–	4	2013
Kelmscott		Bulldogs	John Dunn Oval, Kelmscott	MFL	1897	2009–2017, 2021–	3	2014
Kenwick		Royals	Mills Park, Beckenham	SFL	1948	2009–	2	2024
Kingsley		Cats	Kinglsey Park, Kingsley	MFL	1994	1998–	2	2018
Kingsway (Wanneroo 1977–80)		Kangaroos	Kingsway Sporting Complex, Madeley	MFL	1948	1977–1980, 2008–	4	2024
Koongamia		Crows	Koongamia Oval, Koongamia	MFL	2000	2023–	0	–
Kwinana		Knights	Medina Oval, Medina	MFL	1962	2014–	0	–
Lynwood Ferndale		Panthers	Ferndale Park, Ferndale	–	1979	1979–	3	2012
Maddington		Bulls	Harmony Fields, Maddington	SFL	1923	2009–	2	2016
Manning Rippers		Rippers	James Miller Oval, Manning	–	1997	1997–	2	2023
Melville (Palmyra 1921–57, 1964–67; East Fremantle-Palmyra 1961–62; East Fremantle 1963)		Rams	Melville Reserve, Melville	FSFA, WAFA	1906	1939–1983, 1985–	8	2025
Mosman Park		Mozzies	Tom Perrott Reserve, Mosman Park	SFL	1921	1939–1973, 1998–	5	2023
Mount Lawley		Hawks	Hamer Park Reserve, Mount Lawley	–	1963	1963–	20	2025
Nollamara		Roos	Des Penman Reserve, Nollamara	WAFA	1964	1964–2003, 2008–2023, 2026–	11	2016
Noranda (Noranda-ECU 2011–13)		Hawks	Lightning Park, Noranda	MFL	2004	2011–	2	2015
North Beach		Tigers	Charles Riley Reserve, North Beach	–	1965	1965–	19	2025
North Fremantle		Magpies	Gil Fraser Reserve, North Fremantle	FSFA	1921	1939–	29	2024
North Mandurah		Magpies	Lakelands Reserve, Lakelands	PFL	2019	2022–	0	–
Ocean Ridge (Edgewater 1979–85)		Eagles	Heathridge Park, Heathridge	–	1979	1979–	5	2023
Piara Waters (Southern River 2009–14)		Falcons	Piara Waters Oval, Piara Waters	SFL	1998	2009–	3	2021
Quinns District		Bulls	Ridgewood Park, Ridgewood	MFL	2000	2001–	4	2025
Roleystone		Tigers	Cross Park, Roleystone	WAFA	1987	2009–	1	2021
Rossmoyne		Rhinos	Shelley Park, Shelley	WAFA	1996	1996–2003, 2009–	3	1998
Safety Bay		Stingers	Stan Twight Reserve, Rockingham	MFL	1982	2010–2016, 2023–	0	–
Scarborough		Hawks	Millington Reserve, Karrinyup	–	1970	1970–	17	2020
Secret Harbour		Dockers	Rhonda Scarrott Park, Golden Bay	MFL	2011	2013–	1	2017
SNESA (St Norberts 1978–2010)		Saints	Queens Park Reserve, Queens Park	WAFA	1978	1978–2003, 2005–	2	1997
Stirling (Balcatta-Osborne Park 1998–2001)		Saints	Richard Guelfi Reserve, Balcatta	–	1988	1998–	4	2025
Swan Athletic		Swans	Swan Athletic Oval, Herne Hill	HFA	1930	1979	9	2024
Swan Valley		Valley	Swan Valley Sporting Complex, Herne Hill	HFA	1965	1973–1979, 2006–	5	1978
Swan View		Swans	Brown Park, Swan View	HFA	1962	1981–1982, 1989–1995, 2002–2016, 2025–	4	2003
Thornlie		Lions	Thornlie Oval, Thornlie	SFL	1970	2009–	2	2017
Trinity Aquinas (Trinity Old Boys 1970–80)		Boomers	Bill Grayden Reserve, Como	–	1970	1970–	12	2017
University			UWA Sports Park, Mount Claremont	–	1928	1928–	47	2024
Wanneroo		Roos	Wanneroo Showgrounds, Wanneroo	–	1985	1985–	10	2022
Warnbro Swans		Swans	Warnbro Recreation Oval, Warnbro	MDFL	1989	1991–	4	2018
Warwick Greenwood		Bulls	Percy Doyle Reserve, Duncraig	SFL	2003	2025–	0	–
Wembley		Magpies	Wembley Sports Park, Jolimont	PSFA	1927	1938–	30	2020
West Coast (West Coast Cowan 2001–13)		Tigers	City Beach Oval, City Beach	–	1984	1984–	8	2021
Whitford		Warriors	MacDonald Park, Padbury	–	1976	1976–	9	2016
Willetton		Blues	Burrendah Reserve, Willetton	SFL	1976	1976–1978, 1999–	3	2007
Yanchep		Red Hawks	Splendid Park, Yanchep	MFL	1997	2015–	0	–

=== Sunday Football League ===
Club	Colours	Nickname	Home Ground	Former League	Est.	Years in SFL	MFL/SFL Premierships	
Club	Colours	Nickname	Home Ground	Former League	Est.	Years in SFL	Total	Years
Beechboro		Bombers	Altone Park, Beechboro	WAAFL	1999	2018–	1	2025
Girrawheen Koondoola (Cobra Jets 2024)		Jets	John Moloney Park, Marangaroo	–	2024	2024–	0	–
Innaloo		Bulldogs	Birralee Park, Innaloo	WAAFL	1964	2000–2006, 2008–	1	Div 2: 2010
Koongamia		Crows	Koongamia Oval, Koongamia	WAAFL	1993	2011–	1	Div 1: 2023
Queens Park		Bulldogs	Queens Park Reserve, Queens Park	–	2013	2013–	7	Div 1: 2016, 2017, 2018, 2020, 2021, 2022 Div 2: 2013
South Mandurah Thirds		Falcons	Falcon Reserve, Falcon	–	1982	2023, 2025–	0	–

== Country leagues ==
=== Avon Football Association ===
Club	Colours	Nickname	Home ground	Former League	Est.	Years in AFA	League Premierships	
Club	Colours	Nickname	Home ground	Former League	Est.	Years in AFA	Total	Years
Beverley		Redbacks	Beverley Showgrounds, Beverley	AVFA		1959–	9	1960, 1961, 1973, 1976, 1992, 1996, 2003, 2010, 2012
Cunderdin		Magpies	Cunderdin Oval, Cunderdin	EAFA		1959–	13	1964, 1965, 1975, 1977, 1978, 1985, 1986, 1987, 2014, 2021, 2022, 2023, 2025
Federals		Feds	Henry Street Oval, Northam	AVFA	1900	1959–	5	2000, 2001, 2005, 2006, 2015
Kellerberrin-Tammin		Kats	Kellerberrin Sports Ground, Kellerberrin and Tammin Football Ground, Tammin	–	1995	1995–	7	1998, 2004, 2011, 2013, 2016, 2017, 2019
Quairading		Bulls	Quairading Showgrounds, Quairading	EAFA		1959–	9	1962, 1974, 1979, 1990, 1991, 1994, 1997, 2008, 2024
Railways		Bombers	Henry Street Oval, Northam	–	1968	1968–	7	1969, 1984, 1995, 1999, 2007, 2009, 2018
York		Roos	Forrest Oval, York	AVFA		1959–	4	1983, 1988, 1993, 2002

=== Central Kimberley Football League ===
Club	Colours	Nickname	Home ground	Est.	Years in CKFL	CKFL Premierships	
Club	Colours	Nickname	Home ground	Est.	Years in CKFL	Total	Years
Bayulu		Bulldogs	Fitzroy Oval, Fitzroy Crossing		1998–	5	2009, 2012, 2013, 2014, 2025
Kadjina		Cats	Fitzroy Oval, Fitzroy Crossing		2025-	0	-
Muludja		Lions	Fitzroy Oval, Fitzroy Crossing		2018–	0	-
Noonkanbah-Yungngora (Mejerrikan 2005, Nyikina 2011-12)		Blues	Fitzroy Oval, Fitzroy Crossing		1994–	5	2000, 2007, 2015, 2017, 2019
River		Roos	Fitzroy Oval, Fitzroy Crossing		2004-?, 2025-	0	-
Wangkatjunka		Crows	Fitzroy Oval, Fitzroy Crossing		1996–2012, 2014–	1	2018

=== Central Midlands Coastal Football League ===
Club	Colours	Nickname	Home ground	Former League	Est.	Years in CMCFL	Premierships	
Club	Colours	Nickname	Home ground	Former League	Est.	Years in CMCFL	Total	Years
Cervantes		Tiger Sharks	Cervantes Oval, Cervantes	CFA	1983	1992–	20	1995, 1998, 1999, 2000, 2001, 2003, 2004, 2005, 2006, 2008, 2009, 2010, 2011, 2012, 2013, 2015, 2016, 2018, 2019, 2022
Dandaragan		Saints	Dandaragan Town Oval, Dandaragan	CMFL	1968	1992–2001, 2003–	4	1994, 2007, 2024, 2025
Jurien Bay		Bulldogs	Jurien Bay Oval, Jurien Bay	CFA	1973	1992–2001, 2003–	3	1996, 2017, 2023
Lancelin-Ledge Point		Pirates	Lancelin Sporting Complex, Lancelin	–	1995	2009–	2	2014, 2021
Moora		Mavericks	Moora Recreation Reserve, Moora	–	2013	2013–	0	–

=== Central Wheatbelt Football League ===
Club	Colours	Nickname	Home ground	Former League	Est.	Years in CWFL	Premierships	
Club	Colours	Nickname	Home ground	Former League	Est.	Years in CWFL	Total	Years
Beacon		Bombers	Beacon Town Oval, Beacon	DFA		1968–1969, 1976–	14	1979, 1980, 1986, 1989, 1991, 1992, 1993, 1994, 1995, 1996, 1997, 1999, 2000, 2009
Bencubbin		Demons	Bencubbin Oval, Bencubbin	DFA		1968–	6	1985, 1987, 1988, 2001, 2002, 2013
Kalannie		Bulldogs	Kalannie Town Oval, Kalannie	CMFL		1984–	9	2003, 2004, 2005, 2011, 2016, 2022, 2023, 2024, 2025
Koorda		Kangaroos	Koorda Showgrounds, Koorda	KWFA		1968–	8	1984, 2008, 2010, 2012, 2014, 2017, 2019, 2021
Mukinbudin		Rams	Mukinbudin Oval, Mukinbudin	–	1969	1969–	10	1969, 1976, 1977, 1978, 1981, 1998, 2006, 2007, 2015, 2018

=== Eastern Districts Football League ===
Club	Colours	Nickname	Home ground	Former League	Est.	Years in EDFL	Premierships	
Club	Colours	Nickname	Home ground	Former League	Est.	Years in EDFL	Total	Years
Bruce Rock		Magpies	Bruce Rock Oval, Bruce Rock	BRNFA	1912	1960–	4	1965, 1977, 2000, 2017
Burracoppin		Cats	Burracoppin Oval, Burracoppin	MFA	1923	1960–	5	1981, 1988, 1989, 1991, 1992
Corrigin		Tigers	Corrigin Oval, Corrigin	CFA		1971–	4	1976, 1996, 2012, 2025
Hyden-Karlgarin		Saints	Hyden Oval, Hyden	LGKDFA	1971	1983–	6	2002, 2003, 2005, 2014, 2021, 2022
Kulin-Kondinin		Blues	Kulin Town Oval, Kulin and Kondinin Sporting Complex, Kondinin	–	2005	2005–	7	2006, 2008, 2010, 2011, 2013, 2015, 2016, 2018
Narembeen		Hawks	Narembeen Oval, Narembeen	–	1963	1963–	9	1969, 1970, 1972, 1974, 1998, 1999, 2007, 2009, 2023
Nukarni		Demons	Merredin Oval, Merredin	MFA	1923	1960–	12	1961, 1962, 1963, 1966, 1968, 1986, 1987, 1990, 1993, 1994, 1995, 2019
Southern Cross		Bombers	Southern Cross Oval, Southern Cross	CWFL		1966–1986, 1992–	3	2001, 2020, 2024

=== East Kimberley Football Association ===
Club	Colours	Nickname	Home ground	Former League	Est.	Years in EKFL	Known EKFL Premierships	
Club	Colours	Nickname	Home ground	Former League	Est.	Years in EKFL	Total	Years
Bow River		Blues	Warmun Oval, Warmun	–	2014	2014–2021, 2023, 2026	0	-
Kununurra		Demons	Kununurra Town Oval, Kununurra	–	1976	1976-	1	1986
Ord River		Magpies	Ingrid Harvey Oval, Kununurra	–	1972	1972-	11	1996, 1999, 2003, 2004, 2007, 2011, 2012, 2015, 2017, 2023N, 2024
Port Wyndham		Crocs	Clarrie Cassidy Oval, Wyndham	–	1970	1970-1997, 2000-2015, 2017-	3	2002, 2014, 2018
Warmun		Eagles	Warmun Oval, Warmun	–	1998	1998–1999, 2002–2021, 2023–	0	-

=== Esperance District Football Association ===
Club	Jumper	Nickname	Home Ground	Former League	Est.	Years in EDFA	Premierships	
Club	Jumper	Nickname	Home Ground	Former League	Est.	Years in EDFA	Total	Years
Esperance		Bulldogs	Esperance Oval, Nulsen	–	1937	1956–	30	1957, 1958, 1959, 1961, 1962, 1964, 1965, 1967, 1970, 1971, 1972, 1974, 1976, 1977, 1987, 1988, 1999, 2000, 2001, 2005, 2007, 2012, 2013, 2014, 2015, 2016, 2017, 2021, 2024, 2025
Gibson		Tigers	Gibson Oval, Gibson	–	1956	1956–	18	1956, 1979, 1980, 1981, 1982, 1984, 1985, 1986, 1989, 1990, 1991, 1992, 2002, 2006, 2008, 2018, 2019, 2023
Newtown Condingup		Lions	Newtown Oval, Bandy Creek and Condingup Oval, Condingup	–	2005	2005–	2	2009, 2022
Ports		Blues	Ports Oval, Esperance	–	1966	1966–	12	1973, 1975, 1978, 1993, 1996, 1997, 1998, 2003, 2004, 2010, 2011, 2020

=== Fortescue National Football League ===
Club	Colours	Nickname	Home Ground	Est.	Years in FNFL	Premierships	
Club	Colours	Nickname	Home Ground	Est.	Years in FNFL	Total	Years
Paraburdoo		Saints	Paraburdoo Sports Oval, Paraburdoo	1973	1973–	10	1973, 1976, 1990, 1991, 2009, 2015, 2016, 2019, 2022, 2025
Tigers (Crushers 1970–83)		Tigers	Tom Price Oval, Tom Price	1970	1970–	11	1983, 1984, 1989, 1992, 1993, 1995, 1997, 1998, 2000, 2004, 2021
Tom Price Panthers		Panthers	Tom Price Oval, Tom Price	1992	1992–	3	1996, 2012, 2013
Townsite		Eagles	Tom Price Oval, Tom Price	1970	1970–	21	1975, 1977, 1978, 1979, 1986, 1994, 1999, 2001, 2002, 2003, 2005, 2006, 2007, 2008, 2010, 2011, 2014, 2017, 2018, 2023, 2024

=== Gascoyne Football Association ===
Club	Colours	Nickname	Home Ground	Est.	Years	Premierships	
Club	Colours	Nickname	Home Ground	Est.	Years	Total	Years
Exmouth		Eagles	Talanjee Oval, Exmouth	1993	1993–	10	1995, 1996, 1999, 2006, 2007, 2009, 2016, 2020, 2023, 2024, 2025
Ramblers		Tigers	Festival Grounds, East Carnarvon	1948	1948–	45	1948, 1954, 1956, 1957, 1959, 1960, 1962, 1963, 1967, 1968, 1971, 1973, 1974, 1977, 1978, 1979, 1981, 1983, 1984, 1985, 1987, 1988, 1989, 1990, 1991, 1992, 1993, 1997, 1998, 2000, 2001, 2002, 2004, 2005, 2008, 2010, 2011, 2012, 2013, 2014, 2015, 2017, 2019, 2021, 2022
Warriors		Warriors	Festival Grounds, East Carnarvon	1948	1948–2019, 2022–	10	1958, 1961, 1965, 1975, 1976, 1979, 1980, 1982, 1986, 2018

=== Goldfields Football League ===
Club	Colours	Nickname	Home Ground	Est.	Years in GFL	Premierships	
Club	Colours	Nickname	Home Ground	Est.	Years in GFL	Total	Years
Boulder City		Tigers	Digger Daws Oval, Boulder	1896	1896–	28	1896, 1898, 1899, 1907, 1908, 1909, 1910, 1913, 1924, 1925, 1928, 1932, 1933, 1935, 1948, 1950, 1959, 1977, 1982, 1986, 1989, 1990, 1994, 1997, 1998, 2005, 2016, 2023
Kalgoorlie City (Hannans 1896–99)		Kangaroos	Sir Richard Moore Oval, Piccadilly	1895	1896–	15	1897, 1927, 1930, 1941, 1953, 1954, 1962, 1980, 1984, 1988, 1992, 1999, 2013, 2019, 2021
Kalgoorlie Railways		Panthers	Sir Richard Moore Oval, Piccadilly	1899	1900–	34	1903, 1904, 1905, 1911, 1912, 1919, 1920, 1929, 1931, 1939, 1945, 1952, 1958, 1960, 1963, 1964, 1966, 1971, 1973, 1974, 1975, 1978, 1979, 1983, 1987, 2000, 2002, 2006, 2011, 2012, 2014, 2017, 2022, 2024
Kambalda		Eagles	Kambalda Oval, Kambalda East	1968	1969–	3	1976, 1981, 1985
Mines Rovers		Diorites	Digger Daws Oval, Boulder	1898	1898–	44	1900, 1901, 1902, 1906, 1914, 1915, 1918, 1921, 1922, 1923, 1926, 1934, 1936, 1937, 1938, 1940, 1946, 1947, 1949, 1951, 1955, 1956, 1957, 1961, 1965, 1967, 1968, 1969, 1970, 1972, 1991, 1993, 1995, 1996, 2001, 2003, 2004, 2007, 2008, 2009, 2010, 2015, 2018, 2025

=== Great Northern Football League ===
Club	Colours	Nickname	Home Ground	Former League	Est.	Years in GNFL	Premierships	
Club	Colours	Nickname	Home Ground	Former League	Est.	Years in GNFL	Total	Years
Brigades		Hawks	GBSC Sports Park, Spalding	GNFA	1909	1961–	8	1962, 1971, 1986, 1988, 2015, 2018, 2021, 2025
Chapman Valley		Royals	Mazzuchelli Oval, Nabawa	–	1961	1961–	5	1972, 1973, 1974, 1992, 2024
Mullewa		Saints	Mullewa Town Oval, Mullewa	–	1963	1963–	9	1966, 1983, 1984, 1987, 1991, 1996, 2005, 2013, 2017
Northampton		Rams	Northampton Community Oval, Northampton	–	1961	1961–	7	1967, 1968, 1977, 1978, 1979, 2004, 2023
Railways		Blues	The Recreation Ground, Beachlands	GNFA	1904	1961–	12	1961, 1964, 1965, 1969, 1970, 1980, 1981, 1982, 1985, 1989, 2010, 2011
Rovers		Demons	Greenough Oval, Utakarra	GNFA	1895	1961–	11	1963, 1975, 1990, 1994, 1995, 1997, 1998, 2000, 2019, 2020, 2022
Towns		Bulldogs	WA Country Builders Stadium, Wonthella	GNFA	1952	1961–	13	1976, 1993, 1999, 2001, 2002, 2003, 2006, 2007, 2008, 2009, 2012, 2014, 2016

=== Great Southern Football League ===
Club	Colours	Logo	Home ground	Former League	Est.	Years in GSFL	GSFL Premierships	
Club	Colours	Logo	Home ground	Former League	Est.	Years in GSFL	Total	Years
Albany		Sharks	Centennial Oval, Centennial Park	–	2009	2009–	2	2023, 2024
Denmark Walpole		Magpies	McLean Park, Denmark	–	1997	1997–	1	2010
Mount Barker		Bulls	Souness Park, Mount Barker	–	1994	1994–	1	1996
North Albany		Kangas	Collingwood Park, Collingwood Park	SDFA	1897	1991–	9	2005, 2006, 2007, 2008, 2014, 2015, 2016, 2017, 2018
Railways		Tigers	Railways Oval, Centennial Park	SDFA	1946	1991–	5	2012, 2013, 2021, 2022, 2025
Royals		Lions	Centennial Oval, Centennial Park	SDFA	1897	1991–	14	1993, 1994, 1995, 1999, 2000, 2001, 2002, 2003, 2004, 2009, 2011, 2019, 2020

=== Hills Football Association ===
Club	Colours	Logo	Home ground	Former League	Est.	Years in competition	Premierships	
Club	Colours	Logo	Home ground	Former League	Est.	Years in competition	Total	Years
Chidlow		Cougars	Chidlow Recreation Ground, Chidlow			1946–1950, 1990–1995, 1997–	8	1946, 1948, 1998 (Div 2), 2014, 2017, 2018, 2021, 2022
Gidgegannup		Bulldogs	Percy Cullen Oval, Gidgegannup			1979–	12	1984, 2000 (Div 2), 2003, 2006, 2007, 2009, 2010, 2011, 2012, 2013, 2015, 2016
Midland		Tigers	North Swan Park, Middle Swan	SFL	1897	1997–2001, 2026–	0	
Mt Helena		Lions	Elsie Austin Oval, Mount Helena	–	1948	1949–1950, 1953–1963, 1965–1968, 1980–1982, 1984–1989, 1993–	3	1982, 1999 (Div 2), 2020
Mundaring		Roos	Mundaring Recreation Ground, Mundaring	PFL		1946–1964, 1967–1968, 1972, 1979–1986, 1995–	11	1947, 1949, 1956, 1959, 1980, 1981, 1983, 1986, 2002, 2008, 2019
Pickering Brook		Hawks	George Spriggs Reserve, Pickering Brook			1973–1974, 1979–1982, 1988–1989, 1993–1997, 2000–2001, 2010–	1	2023

=== Lower South West Football League ===
Club	Colours	Nickname	Home Ground	Former League	Est.	Years in LSWFL	LSWFL Premierships	
Club	Colours	Nickname	Home Ground	Former League	Est.	Years in LSWFL	Total	Years
Boyup Brook		Roos	Boyup Brook Oval, Boyup Brook	NFA		1959–	4	1981, 2012, 2022, 2024
Bridgetown		Bulldogs	Bridgetown Greater Sports Ground, Bridgetown	–	1959	1959–	5	1984, 1986, 2003, 2019, 2021
Deanmill		Hawks	Deanmill Oval, Deanmill	WFA	1920	1959–	18	1963, 1966, 1968, 1970, 1972, 1973, 1974, 1980, 1987, 1990, 1991, 1994, 1997, 2002, 2008, 2009, 2015, 2025
Imperials		Magpies	Manjimup Recreation Oval, Manjimup	WFA	1930	1959–	9	1961, 1982, 1983, 1989, 1993, 1998, 2004, 2007, 2018
Kojonup		Cougars	Kojonup Oval, Kojonup	GSFL	1923	2008–	2	2014, 2023
Manjimup		Tigers	Rea Park, Manjimup	–	1959	1959–	8	1959, 1960, 1962, 1977, 1978, 1996, 2010, 2013
Southerners		Souths	Pemberton Oval, Pemberton	–	1959	1959–	20	1964, 1965, 1967, 1969, 1971, 1975, 1976, 1979, 1985, 1988, 1992, 1995, 2000, 2001, 2005, 2006, 2011, 2016, 2017

=== Mortlock Football League ===
Club	Colours	Nickname	Home ground	Former League	Est.	Years in MFL	MFL Premierships	
Club	Colours	Nickname	Home ground	Former League	Est.	Years in MFL	Total	Years
Calingiri		Cougars	Calingiri Oval, Calingiri	VPFA	1920	1959–	13	1962, 1975, 1976, 1978, 1983, 1984, 1986, 1989, 1990, 1991, 2000, 2006, 2015
Dalwallinu		Bulldogs	Dalwallinu Oval, Dalwallinu	CMFL	1968	1992–	1	2017
Dowerin (Note: Known as Dowerin-Wyalkatchem from 2013–2023)		Tigers	Dowerin Oval, Dowerin	DDFA	1903	1923–1924, 1933–	14	1937, 1938, 1939, 1940, 1947, 1972, 1982, 1985, 2005, 2008, 2010, 2012, 2013, 2021
Gingin		Eagles	Gingin Oval, Gingin	HFA	1908	1973–	5	1997, 2002, 2011, 2018, 2023
Goomalling		Blues	Goomalling Oval, Goomalling	–	1945	1945–	25	1945, 1946, 1948, 1952, 1958, 1963, 1964, 1965, 1966, 1967, 1968, 1970, 1971, 1977, 1992, 1993, 1994, 1995, 1996, 1998, 1999, 2007, 2022, 2024, 2025
Toodyay		Lions	Toodyay Oval, Toodyay	VPFA	1888	1958–	8	1961, 1973, 1974, 1980, 1988, 2004, 2014, 2019
Wongan Ballidu		Boomers	Wongan Hills Oval, Wongan Hills	–	1996	1996–	2	2009, 2016

=== Newman National Football League ===
Club	Colours	Nickname	Est.	Years in NFNL	NNFL Premierships	
Club	Colours	Nickname	Est.	Years in NFNL	Total	Years
Centrals		Lions	1972	1972–	8	1972, 1976, 1979, 1992, 1994, 1995, 2010, 2012
Pioneers		Demons	1975	1975–	10	1980, 1981, 1982, 1983, 1984, 2002, 2022, 2023, 2024, 2025
Saints		Saints	1972	1972–	20	1973, 1974, 1978, 1986, 1988, 1990, 1997, 1999, 2000, 2001, 2003, 2004, 2006, 2014, 2015, 2016, 2017, 2018, 2019, 2021
Tigers		Tigers	1972	1972–	15	1975, 1977, 1985, 1987, 1989, 1991, 1993, 1996, 1998, 2005, 2007, 2008, 2009, 2011, 2013

=== North Midlands Football League ===
Club	Colours	Nickname	Home Ground	Former League	Est.	Years in NMFL	NMFL Premierships	
Club	Colours	Nickname	Home Ground	Former League	Est.	Years in NMFL	Total	Years
Carnamah-Perenjori		Roos	Carnamah Sports Oval, Carnamah and Perenjori Oval, Perenjori	–	1995	1995–	3	2004, 2012, 2023
Coorow-Latham		Magpies	Maley Park, Coorow	–	1971	1971–	11	1972, 1975, 1976, 1982, 1986, 1993, 1995, 2006, 2021, 2022, 2024
Dongara		Eagles	Dongara Recreation Ground, Port Denison	CFA, GNFL	1974	1981–1994, 2000–	6	1990, 1991, 1994, 2008, 2016, 2019
Mingenew		Bulldogs	Mingenew Town Oval, Mingenew	–	1961	1961–	16	1964, 1979, 1983, 1989, 1997, 1998, 2001, 2002, 2003, 2007, 2009, 2010, 2013, 2014, 2015, 2017
Morawa		Tigers	Morawa Town Oval, Morawa	–	1964	1964–	14	1967, 1969, 1978, 1980, 1981, 1984, 1985, 1987, 1988, 1996, 2011, 2018, 2020, 2025
Three Springs		Bombers	Three Springs Oval, Three Springs	–	1903	1921–	15	1929, 1935, 1948, 1949, 1953, 1955, 1957, 1963, 1971, 1974, 1977, 1992, 1999, 2000, 2005

=== North Pilbara Football League ===
Club	Colours	Nickname	Home Ground	Former League	Est.	Years in NPFL	NPFL Premierships	
Club	Colours	Nickname	Home Ground	Former League	Est.	Years in NPFL	Total	Years
Dampier		Sharks	Windy Ridge Oval, Dampier	WPFA	1972	1977–	10	1983, 1984, 2005, 2008, 2009, 2021, 2022, 2023, 2024, 2025
Karratha Falcons		Falcons	Butler Reserve, Bulgarra	–	1979	1979–	5	1986, 1987, 1988, 2006, 2010
Karratha Kats		Kats	Kevin Richards Oval, Millars Well	WPFA	1972	1977–	12	1979, 1981, 1989, 1991, 1999, 2000, 2001, 2003, 2004, 2014, 2016, 2018
Port Hedland Rovers		Bulldogs	Colin Matheson Oval, Port Hedland	DGFA	1967	1977–	9	1978, 1990, 1997, 1998, 2002, 2007, 2011, 2012, 2013
South Hedland		Mighty Swans	Kevin Scott Oval, South Hedland	DGFA	1975	1977–	9	1980, 1985, 1992, 1993, 1994, 1995, 1996, 2015, 2020
Wickham		Wolves	Wickham Town Oval, Wickham	WPFA	1972	1977–	2	2017, 2019

=== Ongerup Football Association ===
Club	Colours	Nickname	Home Ground	Former League	Est.	Years in OFA	OFA Senior Premierships	
Club	Colours	Nickname	Home Ground	Former League	Est.	Years in OFA	League	
Club	Colours	Nickname	Home Ground	Former League	Est.	Years in OFA	Total	Years
Boxwood Hill		Bombers	Boxwood Town Oval, Boxwood Hill	–	1968	1968–	11	1970, 1977, 1978, 2000, 2002, 2003, 2004, 2005, 2006, 2018, 2019
Gnowangerup		Bulldogs	Gnowangerup Sporting Complex, Gnowangerup	CGSFL	1917	1987–	7	1996, 2015, 2017, 2020, 2021, 2022, 2025
Jerramungup		Eagles	Jerramungup Town Oval, Jerramungup	–	1968	1968–	13	1969, 1983, 1986, 1987, 1990, 1992, 1993, 2008, 2009, 2010, 2011, 2013, 2014
Lake Grace-Pingrup		Bombers	Lake Grace Town Oval, Lake Grace and Pingrup Town Oval, Pingrup	–	1996	1996–	4	1998, 1999, 2012, 2024
Newdegate		Lions	Newdegate Town Oval, Newdegate			1983–	6	1985, 1988, 1989, 1991, 2016, 2023

=== Onshore Cup Football Association ===
The Onshore Cup Football Association is a competition based in the south-west region of Western Australia. It covers roughly the same geographical region as the South West Football League but is a more social competition, with clubs playing matches every two weeks and fielding only one team.

==== Clubs ====
===== Current =====
Club	Colours	Nickname	Home Ground	Est.	Years in OCFA	Known OCFA Senior Premierships	
Club	Colours	Nickname	Home Ground	Est.	Years in OCFA	Total	Years
Augusta		Abalones	Augusta Town Oval, Augusta		?-present	1	2026
Boyanup		Boars	Boyanup Recreation Ground, Boyanup	2018	2018–	0	–
Bunbury (Dalyellup 2021–23)		Eagles	Hay Park, Withers	2021	2021–	0	–
Busselton		Bombers	Bovell Oval, Bovell	1989	1989–	5	2019, 2022, 2023, 2024, 2025
Vasse (Capel ?-2018)		Kakkas	Bovell Oval, Bovell		?-present	0	–

===== Former =====
Club	Colours	Nickname	Home Ground	Est.	Years in OCFA	Known OCFA Senior Premierships		Fate
Club	Colours	Nickname	Home Ground	Est.	Years in OCFA	Total	Years	Fate
Bunbury Emus		Emus		2006	2006	0	–	Folded at unknown date
Bunbury Mulloways		Mulloways		2006	2006–2011	0	–	Folded after 2011 season
Dunsborough-Yallingup		Mulies	Dunsborough Playing Fields, Dunsborough	1983	1983–2025	9	2003, 2005, 2011, 2012, 2013, 2016, 2017, 2018, 2019, 2021	In recess since Round 1 of 2025 season
Margaret River			Gloucester Park, Margaret River		?-2004	0	–	Folded after 2004 season
Nannup		Tigers	Nannup Recreation Centre, Nannup		?-2005, 2012–2016	0	–	Recess between 2006–11. Folded after 2016 season

=== Peel Football League ===
Club	Colours	Nickname	Home Ground	Former League	Est.	Years in PFNL	PFNL Premierships	
Club	Colours	Nickname	Home Ground	Former League	Est.	Years in PFNL	Total	Years
Centrals		Blues	Mundijong Oval, Mundijong	MFL	1909	1992–	6	1992, 1999, 2000, 2007, 2023, 2024
Halls Head		Lightning	Merlin Street Reserve, Falcon	–	1999	2008–	0	–
HMAS Stirling		Pussers	HMAS Stirling, Garden Island	–	2023	2023–	0	–
Mandurah Mustangs		Mustangs	Rushton Park, Mandurah	SFL	1927	1992–	3	1993, 1995, 2003
Pinjarra		Tigers	Sir Ross McLarty Oval, Pinjarra	MFL	1911	1992–	8	1994, 2001, 2002, 2013, 2014, 2017, 2018, 2022
Rockingham		Rams	Anniversary Park, Rockingham	WAAFL	1954	1994–	1	1997
Secret Harbour		Dockers	Rhonda Scarrott Oval, Golden Bay	PFL	2011	2024–	0	–
South Mandurah		Falcons	Falcon Oval, Falcon	MFL	1982	1992–	6	1998, 2006, 2008, 2015, 2021, 2025
Waroona		Demons	Waroona Oval, Waroona	MFL	1930	1992–	4	2009, 2010, 2011, 2012

=== Ravensthorpe & District Football Association ===
Club	Colours	Nickname	Home Ground	Former League	Est.	Years in RDFA	RDFA premierships	
Club	Colours	Nickname	Home Ground	Former League	Est.	Years in RDFA	Total	Years
Ravensthorpe		Tigers	Ravensthorpe Oval, Ravensthorpe	–	1968	1968–	25	1972, 1975, 1980, 1984, 1986, 1987, 1989, 1990, 1995, 1996, 1997, 2001, 2002, 2005, 2009, 2012, 2013, 2014, 2015, 2017, 2018, 2019, 2020, 2021, 2024
Southerners		Sharks	Hopetoun Oval, Hopetoun	–	1968	1968–	13	1969, 1970, 1977, 198, 1979, 1992, 1994, 2007, 2008, 2016, 2022, 2023, 2025

=== South East Kimberley Football League ===
The South East Kimberley Football League is a competition based in the Kimberley region of Western Australia. Founded in 2026, the league currently consists of seven clubs. Triple headers are played every round at Halls Creek Oval on Saturday afternoons, with the occasional Friday afternoon round.

==== Clubs ====
Club	Colours	Nickname	Former League	Years in SEKFL	Premierships	
Club	Colours	Nickname	Former League	Years in SEKFL	Total	Years
Halls Creek		Hawks	EKFL	2026-	0	–
Kundat Djaru		Cats	EKFL	2026-	0	–
Kururrungku		Roos	EKFL	2026-	0	–
Mulan		Saints	EKFL	2026-	0	–
Wirrimanu		Tigers	EKFL	2026-	0	–
Yardgee		Dockers	EKFL	2026-	0	–
Yiyili		Powers	EKFL	2026-	0	–

=== South West Football League ===
Club	Colours	Nickname	Home Ground	Former League	Est.	Years in SWFL	SWFL Premierships	
Club	Colours	Nickname	Home Ground	Former League	Est.	Years in SWFL	Total	Years
Augusta Margaret River		Hawks	Gloucester Park, Margaret River	–	1966	1966–	5	1994, 1995, 2011, 2021, 2022
Bunbury		Bulldogs	PC Payne Park, Bunbury	BFA	1892	1953–	10	1956, 1958, 1961, 1962, 1970, 1982, 1983, 2001, 2017, 2020
Busselton		Magpies	Sir Stuart Bovell Park, Busselton	–	1955	1955–	6	1964, 1967, 1978, 1996, 2012, 2015, 2023
Carey Park (Bunbury Pastimes 1953–56)		Panthers	Kelly Park, Bunbury	BFA	1914	1953–	7	1963, 1973, 1986, 2003, 2006, 2008, 2009
Collie Eagles		Eagles	Collie Recreation Ground, Collie	–	2002	2002–	2	2004, 2005
Dunsborough		Sharks	Dunsborough Playing Fields, Dunsborough	–	1996	2022–	0	–
Donnybrook		Dons	VC Mitchell Park, Donnybrook	DFA	1897	1953–	5	1977, 1998, 1999, 2000, 2018
Eaton (Boyanup-Capel-Dardanup 1959–99)		Boomers	Glen Huon Oval, Eaton	–	1959	1959–	2	2013, 2014
Harvey Bulls		Bulls	Harvey Recreation Ground, Harvey	PFNL	1994	2009–	0	–
Harvey Brunswick Leschenault (Harvey Brunswick 1956–90)		Lions	Brunswick Oval, Brunswick Junction	HBFA	1956	1956–	9	1960, 1974, 1975, 1990, 1991, 1992, 2007, 2010, 2019
South Bunbury		Tigers	Hands Oval, South Bunbury	BFA	1897	1953–	20	1953, 1954, 1955, 1957, 1959, 1966, 1968, 1971, 1976, 1980, 1981, 1984, 1985, 1988, 1989, 1993, 2002, 2016, 2024, 2025

=== Upper Great Southern Football League ===
Club	Jumper	Nickname	Home Ground	Former League	Est.	Years in UGSFL	UGSFL premierships	
Club	Jumper	Nickname	Home Ground	Former League	Est.	Years in UGSFL	Total	Years
Boddington		Eagles	Boddington Town Oval, Boddington	NFA	1946	1959–	10	1989, 1990, 1991, 1995, 2002, 2012, 2018, 2019, 2022, 2024
Brookton-Pingelly		Panthers	Brookton Town Oval, Brookton and Pingelly Town Oval, Pingelly	–	1997	1997–2022, 2024	1	2003
Katanning Wanderers		Tigers	Quartermaine Oval, Katanning	GSFL	1922	2003–	3	2017, 2021, 2023
Kukerin-Dumbleyung		Cougars	Nenke Oval, Kukerin and Stubbs Park, Dumbleyung	CGSFL	1989	1991–	7	1992, 1993, 1996, 1998, 2001, 2005, 2006
Narrogin Hawks		Hawks	Narrogin Town Oval, Narrogin	–	2004	2004–	1	2015
Wagin Bulldogs		Bulldogs	Matera Oval, Wagin	–	2005	2005–	0	
Wickepin		Warriors	Wickepin Town Oval, Wickepin	WFA	c.1913	1960–	8	1965, 1967, 1974, 1975, 1981, 2007, 2008, 2025
Williams		Cats	Williams Town Oval, Williams	NFA		1959–	11	1982, 1983, 1987, 1997, 2009, 2010, 2011, 2013, 2014, 2016, 2020

=== West Kimberley Football Association ===
Club	Colours	Nickname	Home Ground	Former League	Est.	Years in WKFL	WKFL Premierships	
Club	Colours	Nickname	Home Ground	Former League	Est.	Years in WKFL	Total	Years
Bidyadanga (La Grange 1985, 1989)		Emus	Bidyadanga Oval, Bidyadanga	–	1983	1983–1986, 1988	3	1990, 2004, 2016
Broome Bulls (Meatworks 1949–78, 1981–94, Demco 1979–80)		Bulls	Father McMahon and Nipper Roe Ovals, Broome	–	1949	1949–	14	1954, 1957, 1962, 1963, 1964, 1970, 1982, 1989, 1995, 1997, 1998, 1999, 2001, 2017,
Broome Saints		Saints	Father McMahon and Nipper Roe Ovals, Broome	–	1955	1955–	11	1960, 1965, 1967, 1971, 1972, 1973, 1979, 2005, 2006, 2010
Cable Beach (Nyul Nyul 1991–93)		Greenbacks	Father McMahon and Nipper Roe Ovals, Broome	–	1991	1991–	12	1996, 2007, 2009, 2011, 2012, 2014, 2015, 2019, 2021, 2022, 2023, 2025
Looma		Eagles	Father McMahon and Nipper Roe Ovals, Broome	EKFL	1992	2006–	2	2013, 2018
Towns		Falcons	Father McMahon and Nipper Roe Ovals, Broome	–	1949	1949–	24	1951, 1952, 1953, 1955, 1956, 1959, 1961, 1969, 1974, 1975, 1976, 1977, 1978, 1981, 1983, 1985, 1986, 1991, 1993, 1994, 2002, 2003, 2008, 2024
