= WKFA =

WKFA can refer to:

- WKFA (FM), a radio station (89.3 FM) licensed to serve St. Catherine, Florida, United States
- West Kimberley Football Association, an Australian rules football competition based in Western Australia
