= Scott Edwards =

Scott Edwards may refer to:

- Scott V. Edwards, Harvard University professor of organismal and evolutionary biology
- Scott Edwards (cricketer) (born 1996), Dutch cricketer
- Scott Edwards (footballer) (born 1968), Australian rules footballer
- Scott Edwards (bowls) (born 1973), English indoor bowler

== See also ==
- Scott-Edwards House, a historic house in Staten Island, New York
