= Scott Edwards (footballer) =

Australian rules footballer

Personal information
- Full name: Scott Harrison Edwards
- Born: 23 August 1968 (age 58)
- Original team: Beverley (AFA)
- Debut: Round 1, 1995, Fremantle vs. Richmond, at the MCG
- Height: 180 cm (5 ft 11 in)
- Weight: 84 kg (185 lb)

Playing career^{1}
Years	Club	Games (Goals)
1988–1996	Claremont	125 (12)
1995–1996	Fremantle	15 (2)
Total		140 (14)
- ^{1} Playing statistics correct to the end of 1996.

Scott Harrison Edwards (born 23 August 1968) is an Australian rules footballer who played for the Fremantle Dockers between 1995 and 1996.

Originally from Beverley Football Club in the Avon Football Association (AFA), Edwards debuted for Claremont in the WAFL in 1988.

Edwards was a foundation selection in the 1994 AFL draft and played mainly as a wingman.

Edwards played in five WAFL Grand Finals for Claremont, winning four premierships. His father, Dale Edwards, also won a premiership with Claremont in 1964. His brother Marc played a few games for Claremont in 1992.
