= East Kimberley Football League =

The East Kimberley Football League is an Australian rules football competition based in the Kimberley region of Western Australia, with some clubs also located across the border in the Northern Territory.

The league was formed in 1970.

== Clubs ==
Records before 1993 are incomplete, thus information from before that date is mostly absent from the below tables.

=== Current ===
==== Senior Men ====
Club	Colours	Nickname	Home ground	Former League	Est.	Years in EKFL	Known EKFL Premierships	
Club	Colours	Nickname	Home ground	Former League	Est.	Years in EKFL	Total	Years
Bow River		Blues	Warmun Oval, Warmun	–	2014	2014–2021, 2023, 2026	0	-
Kununurra		Demons	Kununurra Town Oval, Kununurra	–	1976	1976-	2	1986, 1998
Ord River		Magpies	Ingrid Harvey Oval, Kununurra	–	1972	1972-	12	1996, 1999, 2003, 2004, 2007, 2011, 2012, 2015, 2017, 2023, 2024, 2026
Port Wyndham		Crocs	Clarrie Cassidy Oval, Wyndham	–	1970	1970-1997, 2000-2015, 2017-	3	2002, 2014, 2018
Warmun		Eagles	Warmun Oval, Warmun	–	1998	1998–1999, 2002–2021, 2023–	0	-

==== Senior Women ====
Club	Colours	Nickname	Home ground	Former League	Est.	Years in EKFL	EKFL Premierships	
Club	Colours	Nickname	Home ground	Former League	Est.	Years in EKFL	Total	Years
Kununurra		Demons	Kununurra Town Oval, Kununurra	–	1976	2021-	0	-
Ord River		Magpies	Ingrid Harvey Oval, Kununurra	–	1972	2021-	3	2021, 2025, 2026
Port Wyndham		Crocs	Clarrie Cassidy Oval, Wyndham	–	1970	2021-	0	-

=== Former ===
==== Men ====
Club	Colours	Nickname	Home ground	Former League	Est.	Years in EKFL	Known EKFL Premierships		Fate
Club	Colours	Nickname	Home ground	Former League	Est.	Years in EKFL	Total	Years	Fate
Ganinya		Giants	Halls Creek Oval, Halls Creek	–	2023	2023	0	-	Folded after 2023 season
Halls Creek		Hawks	Halls Creek Oval, Halls Creek			1992-2023	7	1993, 1994, 1995, 1997, 2006, 2008, 2022	Recess between 2024-25. Formed South East Kimberley FL in 2026
Kundat Djaru		Cats	Halls Creek Oval, Halls Creek	–	2009	2009–2014, 2016–2023	0	-	Recess between 2024-25. Formed South East Kimberley FL in 2026
Kururrungku		Roos	Halls Creek Oval, Halls Creek	–	2010	2010-2023	0	-	Recess between 2024-25. Formed South East Kimberley FL in 2026
Mulan		Saints	Halls Creek Oval, Halls Creek	–	1990s	1996, 2017	0	-	Recess between 2018-25. Formed South East Kimberley FL in 2026
Timber Creek		Lions	Max Duncan Memorial Oval, Timber Creek	–	2000s	2005–2007, 2011–2014	0	-	Recess between 2015-22, re-formed as Ngaliwurru in Big Rivers FL in 2023
Waringarri		Crows	Kununurra Town Oval, Kununurra	–	2000	2000-2025	7	2001, 2005, 2009, 2010, 2013, 2016 2025	Entered recess before 2026 season
Wirrimanu		Tigers	Halls Creek Oval, Halls Creek	–	2011	2011-2017, 2020-2023	0	-	Recess between 2024-25. Formed South East Kimberley FL in 2026
Yardgee		Dockers	Halls Creek Oval, Halls Creek	–	2012	2012-2023	1	2023S	Recess between 2024-25. Formed South East Kimberley FL in 2026
Yiyili		Powers	Halls Creek Oval, Halls Creek	CKFL	1998	2021-2022	0	-	Recess between 2023-25. Formed South East Kimberley FL in 2026

==== Women ====
Club	Colours	Nickname	Home ground	Former League	Est.	Years in EKFL	Known EKFL Premierships		Fate
Club	Colours	Nickname	Home ground	Former League	Est.	Years in EKFL	Total	Years	Fate
Halls Creek		Hawks	Halls Creek Oval, Halls Creek			2021-2022	0	-	Entered recess after 2022 season
Waringarri		Crows	Kununurra Town Oval, Kununurra	–	2000	2021, 2023-2025	2	2023, 2024	Entered recess before 2026 season
Warmun		Eagles	Warmun Oval, Warmun	–	1998	2021	0	-	Entered recess after 2021 season
Yardgee		Dockers	Halls Creek Oval, Halls Creek	–	2012	2021-2022	0	-	Entered recess after 2022 season
Yiyili		Powers	Halls Creek Oval, Halls Creek	–	1998	2021-2022	0	-	Entered recess after 2022 season

== 2018 ladder ==
East Kimberley	Wins	Byes	Losses	Draws	For	Against	%	Pts	Final	Team	G	B	Pts	Team	G	B	Pts
Waringarri	9	0	3	0	854	707	54.71%	36	Elimination	Kururrungku Roos	9	12	66	Yardgee Dockers	5	6	36
Kununurra Demons	8	0	4	0	826	609	57.56%	32	Qualifying	Port Wyndham Crocs	10	6	66	Kununurra Demons	4	8	32
Port Wyndham Crocs	8	0	4	0	857	668	56.20%	32	1st semi	Kururrungku Roos	11	5	71	Kununurra Demons	8	11	59
Kururrungku	8	0	4	0	861	848	50.38%	32	2nd semi	Port Wyndham Crocs	13	9	87	Waringarri	9	6	60
Yardgee Dockers	7	0	5	0	748	617	54.80%	28	Preliminary	Kururrungku Roos	14	15	99	Waringarri	12	8	80
Warmun	7	0	5	0	681	587	53.71%	28	Grand	Port Wyndham Crocs	11	17	83	Kururrungku Roos	11	7	73
Ord River	5	0	7	0	668	876	43.26%	20									
Bow River Blues	4	0	8	0	623	685	47.63%	16									
Halls Creek	3	0	9	0	732	804	47.66%	12									
Kundat Djaru Cats	1	0	11	0	484	933	34.16%	4									

== 2019 ladder ==
East Kimberley	Wins	Byes	Losses	Draws	For	Against	%	Pts	Final	Team	G	B	Pts	Team	G	B	Pts
Halls Creek Hawks	12	0	0	0	1166	204	571.57%	48	Elimination	Waringarri Crows	8	7	55	Kununurra Demons	7	8	50
Ord River Magpies	10	0	2	0	972	451	215.52%	40	Qualifying	Ord River Magpies	8	4	52	Warnum Eagles	7	9	51
Warmun Eagles	8	0	4	0	695	438	158.68%	32	1st semi	Warnum Eagles	8	11	59	Waringarri Crows	7	5	47
Kununurra Demons	7	0	5	0	690	587	117.55%	28	2nd semi	Halls Creek Hawks	15	6	96	Ord River Magpies	7	6	48
Waringarri Crows	7	0	5	0	801	740	108.24%	28	Preliminary	Warnum Eagles	1	2	8	Ord River Magpies	0	0	0
Kundat Djaru Cats	5	0	7	0	518	644	80.43%	20	Grand	Halls Creek Hawks	10	8	68	Warnum Eagles	4	2	26
Yardgee Dockers	4	0	8	0	468	359	130.36%	16									
Port Wyndham Crocs	1	0	10	1	459	972	47.22%	6									
Bow River Blues	1	0	11	0	223	684	32.60%	4									
Kururrungku Roos	0	0	11	1	0	913	0.00%	2									
