= 2010 WAFL season =

Australian rules football season

- Teams: 9
- Premiers: Swan Districts; 8th premiership
- Minor premiers: Claremont; 13th minor premiership
- Sandover Medallist: Andrew Krakouer (Swan Districts)
- Bernie Naylor Medallist: Chad Jones (Claremont)
- Matches played: 94

The 2010 WAFL season was the 126th season of the West Australian Football League in its various incarnations. It was notable for the end of the 2000s Subiaco dynasty, with the Lions missing out on the finals for the first time since 1997 and also witnessed reigning premiers South Fremantle dropping to be ahead of only perennial stragglers Peel and Perth, who continued their disastrous record of the 2000s. Peel avoided the wooden spoon with three wins but recorded the second worst average points against in WAFL history, behind only Perth in 1981. In contrast, Claremont, who had not won a premiership since 1996 and had been second last in both 2008 and 2009, rose to the top with only one loss and a draw until the closing home-and-away round, whilst Swan Districts, after suffering through severe financial difficulties and a long run of poor results on the field, ultimately won its eighth senior premiership in a thrilling Grand Final.

== Home-and-away season ==
=== Round 1 ===
	Round 1
Friday, 19 March (6:40 pm)	South Fremantle 15.7 (97)	def.	East Perth 13.15 (93)	Fremantle Oval (crowd: 2642)
Saturday, 20 March (2:15 pm)	West Perth 20.13 (133)	def.	Swan Districts 11.13 (79)	Arena Joondalup (crowd: 2229)
Saturday, 20 March (2:15 pm)	Perth 13.9 (87)	def. by	East Fremantle 13.12 (90)	Lathlain Park (crowd: 2395)
Saturday, 20 March (2:15 pm)	Peel Thunder 9.11 (65)	def. by	Claremont 27.13 (175)	Rushton Park (crowd: 1201)
	Bye; Subiaco
After Peel led by three goals at quarter-time, Claremont with the wind kicked 12.2 to 0.1 in the second quarter.

=== Round 2 ===
	Round 2
Saturday, 27 March (2:15 pm)	Subiaco 8.12 (60)	def. by	West Perth 14.13 (97)	Leederville Oval (crowd: 2229)
Saturday, 27 March (2:15 pm)	Claremont 24.9 (153)	def.	South Fremantle 7.9 (51)	Claremont Oval (crowd: 1682)
Saturday, 27 March (2:15 pm)	Peel Thunder 18.17 (125)	def.	Perth 10.13 (73)	Rushton Park (crowd: 1157)
Saturday, 27 March (2:15 pm)	East Fremantle 9.8 (62)	def.	East Perth 7.13 (55)	East Fremantle Oval (crowd: 1711)
	Bye; Swan Districts

=== Round 3 (Easter weekend) ===
	Round 3
Saturday, 3 April (2:15 pm)	Swan Districts 18.15 (123)	def.	South Fremantle 12.9 (81)	Bassendean Oval (crowd: 2220)
Saturday, 3 April (2:15 pm)	Peel Thunder 15.11 (101)	def. by	East Fremantle 14.19 (103)	Rushton Park (crowd: 1625)
Monday, 5 April (2:15 pm)	East Perth 11.14 (80)	def. by	West Perth 14.13 (97)	Leederville Oval (crowd: 4882)
Monday, 5 April (2:15 pm)	Perth 5.10 (40)	def. by	Subiaco 12.4 (76)	Lathlain Park (crowd: 2974)
	Bye; Claremont

=== Round 4 ===
	Round 4
Saturday, 10 April (2:15 pm)	East Perth 20.19 (139)	def.	Peel Thunder 9.7 (61)	Leederville Oval (crowd: 1696)
Saturday, 10 April (2:15 pm)	East Fremantle 14.7 (91)	def. by	Swan Districts 20.8 (128)	East Fremantle Oval (crowd: 1878)
Sunday, 11 April (2:15 pm)	West Perth 18.14 (122)	def.	South Fremantle 18.11 (119)	Arena Joondalup (crowd: 2351)
Sunday, 11 April (2:15 pm)	Subiaco 8.8 (56)	def. by	Claremont 19.13 (127)	Leederville Oval (crowd: 2332)
	Bye; Perth

=== Round 5 ===
	Round 5
Saturday, 17 April (2:15 pm)	Swan Districts 13.18 (96)	def. by	Subiaco 18.10 (118)	Bassendean Oval (crowd: 2687)
Saturday, 17 April (2:15 pm)	Claremont 20.8 (128)	def.	East Fremantle 8.8 (56)	Claremont Oval (crowd: 2106)
Saturday, 17 April (2:15 pm)	South Fremantle 25.17 (167)	def.	Peel Thunder 12.11 (83)	Fremantle Oval (crowd: 1928)
Saturday, 17 April (3:45 pm)	East Perth 19.12 (126)	def.	Perth 8.11 (59)	Leederville Oval (crowd: 2148)
	Bye; West Perth

=== Round 6 (Anzac Day) ===
	Round 6
Saturday, 24 April (2:15 pm)	Subiaco 15.11 (101)	def.	East Perth 10.16 (76)	Leederville Oval (crowd: 2190)
Saturday, 24 April (2:15 pm)	Perth 15.9 (99)	def. by	Swan Districts 17.13 (115)	Lathlain Park (crowd: 2623)
Saturday, 24 April (2:15 pm)	Claremont 17.15 (117)	def.	West Perth 12.12 (84)	Claremont Oval (crowd: 2751)
Sunday, 25 April (1:30 pm)	East Fremantle 18.15 (123)	def.	South Fremantle 11.11 (77)	East Fremantle Oval (crowd: 3335)
	Bye; Peel Thunder

=== Round 7 ===
	Round 7
Saturday, 1 May (2:15 pm)	Subiaco 24.20 (164)	def.	Peel Thunder 7.8 (50)	Leederville Oval (crowd: 1859)
Saturday, 1 May (2:15 pm)	Swan Districts 22.9 (141)	def.	Claremont 17.6 (108)	Bassendean Oval (crowd: 2581)
Saturday, 1 May (2:15 pm)	West Perth 14.13 (97)	def. by	East Fremantle 14.16 (100)	Arena Joondalup (crowd: 2170)
Saturday, 1 May (2:15 pm)	South Fremantle 17.18 (120)	def.	Perth 15.4 (94)	Fremantle Oval (crowd: 1750)
	Bye; East Perth

=== Round 8 ===
	Round 8
Saturday, 8 May (2:15 pm)	Perth 12.10 (82)	def. by	Claremont 22.9 (141)	Lathlain Park (crowd: 1775)
Saturday, 8 May (2:15 pm)	East Perth 16.12 (108)	def. by	Swan Districts 18.15 (123)	Leederville Oval (crowd: 2123)
Saturday, 8 May (2:15 pm)	East Fremantle 9.15 (69)	def. by	Subiaco 12.10 (82)	East Fremantle Oval (crowd: 1308)
Sunday, 9 May (2:15 pm)	Peel Thunder 16.17 (113)	def.	West Perth 11.6 (72)	Rushton Park (crowd: 1347)
	Bye; South Fremantle

=== Round 9 ===
	Round 9
Saturday, 15 May (2:15 pm)	Subiaco 22.15 (147)	def.	South Fremantle 18.13 (121)	Leederville Oval (crowd: 1894)
Saturday, 15 May (2:15 pm)	Swan Districts 26.17 (173)	def.	Peel Thunder 10.7 (67)	Bassendean Oval (crowd: 1965)
Saturday, 15 May (2:15 pm)	Claremont 17.4 (106)	def.	East Perth 9.16 (70)	Claremont Oval (crowd: 1822)
Saturday, 15 May (2:15 pm)	West Perth 17.12 (114)	def.	Perth 6.19 (55)	Arena Joondalup (crowd: 2580)
	Bye; East Fremantle
Claremont kicked an amazing 13.1 (79) to 9.11 (65) in the first three quarters.

=== Round 10 ===
	Round 10
Saturday, 29 May (2:15 pm)	Swan Districts 20.14 (134)	def.	West Perth 13.7 (85)	Bassendean Oval (crowd: 2931)
Saturday, 29 May (2:15 pm)	Claremont 38.12 (240)	def.	Peel Thunder 7.4 (46)	Claremont Oval (crowd: 1410)
Saturday, 29 May (2:15 pm)	East Perth 13.7 (85)	def. by	South Fremantle 24.11 (155)	Leederville Oval (crowd: 1925)
Saturday, 29 May (2:15 pm)	East Fremantle 17.11 (113)	def.	Perth 9.2 (56)	East Fremantle Oval (crowd: 1120)
	Bye; Subiaco
Claremont recorded the third biggest win in open-age WAFL football, with Chad Jones kicking ten goals.; South Fremantle kicked 14.4 (88) in the second quarter after being three goals down, emulating Claremont in the opening round and equalling East Fremantle in 1951 for the most points in a second quarter in open-age WAFL football.

=== Round 11 (Foundation Day) ===
	Round 11
Saturday, 5 June (2:15 pm)	Perth 23.12 (150)	def.	Peel Thunder 8.11 (59)	Lathlain Park (crowd: 1845)
Monday, 7 June (2:15 pm)	West Perth 19.10 (124)	def. by	East Perth 24.9 (153)	Arena Joondalup (crowd: 4477)
Monday, 7 June (2:15 pm)	South Fremantle 10.10 (70)	def. by	East Fremantle 18.17 (125)	Fremantle Oval (crowd: 8156)
Monday, 7 June (2:15 pm)	Claremont 21.15 (141)	def.	Subiaco 13.14 (92)	Claremont Oval (crowd: 3334)
	Bye; Swan Districts
Perth won their first game for 2010, kicking 16.6 (102) to Peel's 0.4 (4) in the second half after trailing throughout the first half.

=== Round 12 ===
	Round 12
Saturday, 12 June (2:15 pm)	East Fremantle 13.15 (93)	def. by	West Perth 19.13 (127)	East Fremantle Oval (crowd: 1719)
Sunday, 13 June (2:15 pm)	Perth 10.5 (65)	def. by	South Fremantle 17.19 (121)	Wongan Hills (crowd: 1658)
Sunday, 13 June (2:15 pm)	Peel Thunder 12.4 (76)	def. by	East Perth 25.12 (162)	Rushton Park (crowd: 1219)
Sunday, 13 June (2:15 pm)	Subiaco 11.10 (76)	def. by	Swan Districts 17.19 (121)	Leederville Oval (crowd: 2249)
	Bye; Claremont

=== Round 13 ===
	Round 13
Saturday, 19 June (2:15 pm)	West Perth 6.10 (46)	def. by	Claremont 17.9 (111)	Arena Joondalup (crowd: 2319)
Saturday, 19 June (2:15 pm)	East Perth 16.15 (111)	def.	Subiaco 15.13 (103)	Leederville Oval (crowd: 2172)
Saturday, 19 June (2:15 pm)	South Fremantle 14.10 (94)	def. by	Swan Districts 17.13 (115)	Fremantle Oval (crowd: 1931)
Saturday, 19 June (2:15 pm)	East Fremantle 26.17 (173)	def.	Peel Thunder 5.11 (41)	East Fremantle Oval (crowd: 992)
	Bye; Perth

=== Round 14 ===
	Round 14
Saturday, 26 June (2:15 pm)	Subiaco 14.15 (99)	def.	Perth 14.10 (94)	Leederville Oval (crowd: 2062)
Saturday, 26 June (2:15 pm)	Swan Districts 14.12 (96)	def.	East Fremantle 7.11 (53)	Bassendean Oval (crowd: 3002)
Saturday, 26 June (2:15 pm)	Claremont 24.13 (157)	def.	East Perth 6.18 (54)	Claremont Oval (crowd: 2109)
Sunday, 27 June (2:15 pm)	Peel Thunder 11.5 (71)	def. by	South Fremantle 14.17 (101)	Anniversary Park (crowd: 2015)
	Bye; West Perth

=== Round 15 ===
	Round 15
Saturday, 3 July (2:15 pm)	Subiaco 16.5 (101)	def.	East Fremantle 10.11 (71)	Leederville Oval (crowd: 1718)
Saturday, 3 July (2:15 pm)	Swan Districts 16.12 (108)	def.	East Perth 13.9 (87)	Dampier (crowd: 4200)
Saturday, 3 July (2:15 pm)	Perth 10.9 (69)	def. by	West Perth 13.10 (88)	Lathlain Park (crowd: 2131)
Saturday, 3 July (2:15 pm)	South Fremantle 12.6 (78)	def. by	Claremont 16.9 (105)	Wagin (crowd: 1950)
	Bye; Peel Thunder

=== Round 16 ===
	Round 16
Friday, 9 July (6:40 pm)	South Fremantle 12.19 (91)	def.	West Perth 3.9 (27)	Fremantle Oval (crowd: 1369)
Saturday, 10 July (2:15 pm)	Perth 12.10 (82)	def.	Swan Districts 10.12 (72)	Lathlain Park (crowd: 2042)
Saturday, 10 July (2:15 pm)	East Fremantle 12.5 (77)	def. by	Claremont 17.11 (113)	East Fremantle Oval (crowd: 1062)
Saturday, 10 July (2:15 pm)	Peel Thunder 9.16 (70)	def. by	Subiaco 18.14 (122)	Rushton Park (crowd: 817)
	Bye; East Perth
On the only wet night or day of a season which set unprecedented records for dryness due to man-made global warming, Perth caused a huge upset over the eventual premiers, whilst West Perth kicked the lowest WAFL score since 2006 after being goalless to half-time.

=== Round 17 ===
	Round 17
Saturday, 17 July (2:15 pm)	Claremont 15.16 (106)	def.	Perth 12.6 (78)	Claremont Oval (crowd: 1812)
Saturday, 17 July (2:15 pm)	West Perth 19.12 (126)	def.	Subiaco 11.10 (76)	Arena Joondalup (crowd: 1896)
Saturday, 17 July (2:15 pm)	East Perth 16.18 (114)	def.	East Fremantle 9.7 (61)	Leederville Oval (crowd: 1927)
Sunday, 18 July (2:15 pm)	Peel Thunder 16.9 (105)	def. by	Swan Districts 25.14 (164)	Rushton Park (crowd: 1309)
	Bye; South Fremantle

=== Round 18 ===
	Round 18
Saturday, 24 July (2:15 pm)	Subiaco 15.11 (101)	def. by	South Fremantle 18.12 (120)	Leederville Oval (crowd: 1854)
Saturday, 24 July (2:15 pm)	Swan Districts 14.8 (92)	drew with	Claremont 13.14 (92)	Bassendean Oval (crowd: 3067)
Saturday, 24 July (2:15 pm)	Perth 5.6 (36)	def. by	East Perth 22.21 (153)	Lathlain Park (crowd: 3976)
Saturday, 24 July (2:15 pm)	West Perth 28.11 (179)	def.	Peel Thunder 7.13 (55)	Arena Joondalup (crowd: 1511)
	Bye; East Fremantle

=== Round 19 ===
	Round 19
Saturday, 31 July (2:15 pm)	East Fremantle 20.11 (131)	def.	South Fremantle 19.5 (119)	East Fremantle Oval (crowd: 2792)
Sunday, 1 August (2:15 pm)	Peel Thunder 11.7 (73)	def. by	East Perth 29.14 (188)	Rushton Park (crowd: 1056)
	Bye; Claremont, Perth, Swan Districts, Subiaco, West Perth

=== Round 20 ===
	Round 20
Saturday, 7 August (2:15 pm)	Claremont 17.10 (112)	def.	Subiaco 9.7 (61)	Claremont Oval (crowd: 3119)
Saturday, 7 August (2:15 pm)	East Perth 18.10 (118)	def.	West Perth 15.14 (104)	Leederville Oval (crowd: 3303)
Saturday, 7 August (2:15 pm)	South Fremantle 12.13 (85)	def. by	Swan Districts 18.12 (120)	Fremantle Oval (crowd: 1792)
Saturday, 7 August (2:15 pm)	East Fremantle 16.21 (117)	def.	Perth 7.11 (53)	East Fremantle Oval (crowd: 1150)
	Bye; Peel Thunder

=== Round 21 ===
	Round 21
Friday, 13 August (6:40 pm)	South Fremantle 11.11 (77)	def. by	West Perth 15.13 (103)	Fremantle Oval (crowd: 1640)
Saturday, 14 August (2:15 pm)	Claremont 18.10 (118)	def.	Swan Districts 6.9 (45)	Claremont Oval (crowd: 2512)
Saturday, 14 August (2:15 pm)	Perth 13.18 (96)	def. by	Peel Thunder 15.13 (103)	Lathlain Park (crowd: 1984)
Saturday, 14 August (2:15 pm)	Subiaco 9.10 (64)	def. by	East Fremantle 10.15 (75)	Leederville Oval (crowd: 1818)
	Bye; East Perth
East Fremantle defeated Subiaco for the first time since Round 12, 2002. The intervening twenty-game winning streak was the longest in the WAFL by one club against another since 1985, and assured Subiaco would miss the finals for the first time since 1997.; In a game that would decide the wooden spoon with each opponent having won only once against the top seven, Perth kicked themselves out with 0.8 (8) in the last quarter.

=== Round 22 ===
	round 22
Saturday, 21 August (11:15 am)	West Perth 11.6 (72)	def. by	Claremont 22.8 (140)	Bassendean Oval (crowd: 2150)
Saturday, 21 August (2:15 pm)	Swan Districts 25.16 (166)	def.	Perth 16.8 (104)	Bassendean Oval (crowd: 3302)
Saturday, 21 August (2:15 pm)	East Perth 17.7 (109)	def.	Subiaco 13.18 (96)	Leederville Oval (crowd: 2043)
Sunday, 22 August (2:15 pm)	Peel Thunder 7.10 (52)	def. by	East Fremantle 25.15 (165)	Rushton Park (crowd: 1496)
	Bye; South Fremantle

=== Round 23 ===
	Round 23
Saturday, 28 August (2:15 pm)	Swan Districts 22.25 (157)	def.	Peel Thunder 7.5 (47)	Bassendean Oval (crowd: 1957)
Saturday, 28 August (2:15 pm)	West Perth 16.16 (112)	def.	Perth 14.3 (87)	Arena Joondalup (crowd: 2634)
Saturday, 28 August (2:15 pm)	East Perth 12.23 (95)	def.	Claremont 11.13 (79)	Leederville Oval (crowd: 2900)
Saturday, 28 August (2:15 pm)	South Fremantle 21.18 (144)	def. by	Subiaco 33.9 (207)	Fremantle Oval (crowd: 1918)
	Bye; East Fremantle
As a result of the record dry winter in southwestern Australia very firm grounds allowed for the second highest-scoring match in WA(N)FL history and the highest since 1979, with no approach having been made since 1984.; East Perth ended Claremont's thirteen-game unbeaten streak and prevents it equalling its 1987 record of only one loss and a draw in the home-and-away season.

== Ladder ==
2010 ladder
Pos	Team	Pld	W	L	D	PF	PA	PP	Pts
1	Claremont	20	17	2	1	2569	1441	178.3	70
2	Swan Districts (P)	20	15	4	1	2368	1833	129.2	62
3	East Fremantle	20	12	8	0	1948	1761	110.6	48
4	East Perth	20	11	9	0	2176	1878	115.9	44
5	West Perth	20	11	9	0	2009	1927	104.3	44
6	Subiaco	20	10	10	0	2002	1970	101.6	40
7	South Fremantle	20	8	12	0	2088	2193	95.2	32
8	Peel Thunder	20	3	17	0	1463	2963	49.4	12
9	Perth	20	2	18	0	1559	2216	70.4	8

Source: WAFL Footy Facts
Rules for classification: 1) points; 2) percentage; 3) number of points for.
(P) Premiers

== Finals ==
=== First semi-final ===
	First semi-final
Sunday, 5 September (2:15 pm)	East Fremantle 13.10 (88)	def. by	East Perth 15.12 (102)	East Fremantle Oval (crowd: 6,757)

=== Second semi-final ===
	Second semi-final
Sunday, 5 September (2:15 pm)	Claremont 17.17 (119)	def.	Swan Districts 10.9 (69)	Claremont Oval (crowd: 4,215)

=== Preliminary final ===
	Preliminary final
Saturday, 11 September (2:15 pm)	Swan Districts 15.11 (101)	def.	East Perth 9.9 (63)	Bassendean Oval (crowd: 11,251)

=== Grand Final ===
2010 WAFL Grand Final
Sunday, 19 September	Claremont	def. by	Swan Districts	Subiaco Oval (crowd: 24,638)
3.3 (21); 5.6 (36); 9.11 (65); 14.15 (99)	Q1; Q2; Q3; Final	1.6 (12); 5.10 (40); 9.10 (64); 14.16 (100)	Umpires: Craig Hendrie, Stuart Parry, Gavin Statham; Simpson Medal: Andrew Krakouer (Swan Districts)
Chidgzey 3, Foster 3, Crawford 2, Derickx, Swift, Mitchell, Richardson, Schammer, Walton	Goals	Krakouer 4, Coniglio 4, Geappen 3, Simpson, Hansen, Walters
Swans won their first premiership since 1990 after a thrilling game. Krakouer, himself the son of Claremont legend Jimmy, completed the Sandover/Simpson double.
