= Anniversary Park =

Park in Washington, D.C., U.S.

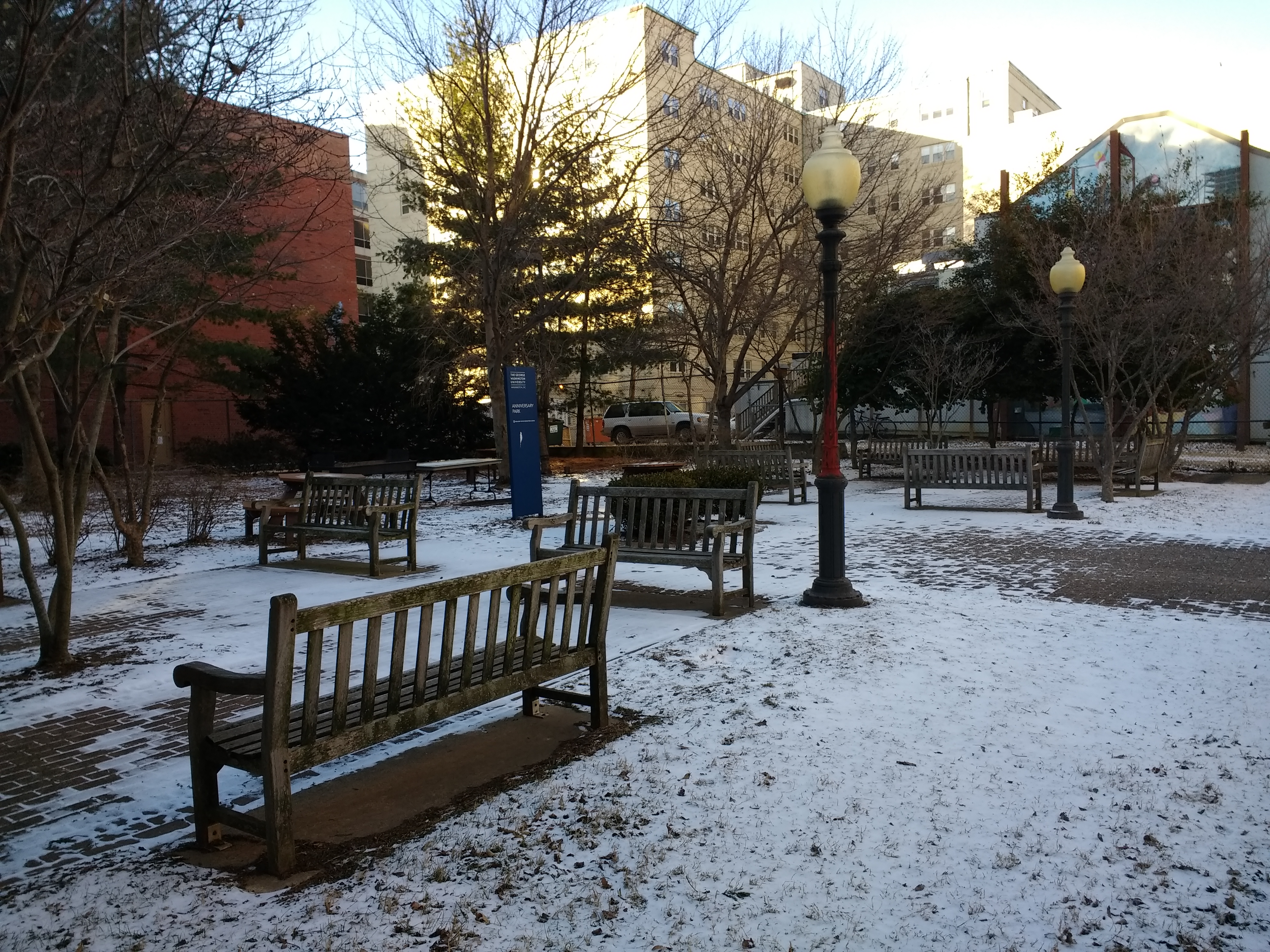
- The park on a winter day in 2018
- Interactive map of Anniversary Park
- Location: Washington, D.C., U.S.
- Coordinates: 38°53′49.6″N 77°2′52.3″W

Anniversary Park is an urban park located at the south end of the George Washington University campus, on F St NW, between 21st and 22nd St NW, in Washington, D.C. The park commemorates George Washington University's 175th anniversary and contains benches, a garden and grills. It had a dedication ceremony in October 1997 with a dedication from former DC mayor Marion Barry. As part of the GW Alumni Brick Program, bricks for the class of 1996 are located in Anniversary Park. There is also a memorial plaque and flowers for alumni who were killed in the September 11, 2001 terrorist attacks.
