= Central Kimberley Football League =

The Central Kimberley Basketball Football League is an Australian rules football competition in the Kimberley region of Western Australia. The league was formed in 1991, and a number of the clubs represent local Aboriginal communities.

Presently there are six clubs in the competition, The league plays triple headers at the Fitzroy Crossing recreation ground, matches usually start at 1pm, 3pm and 5pm.

== Current clubs ==
Club	Colours	Nickname	Home ground	Est.	Years in CKFL	CKFL Premierships	
Club	Colours	Nickname	Home ground	Est.	Years in CKFL	Total	Years
Bayulu		Bulldogs	Fitzroy Oval, Fitzroy Crossing	1998	1998–	5	2009, 2012, 2013, 2014, 2025
Kadjina		Cats	Fitzroy Oval, Fitzroy Crossing	2025	2025-	0	-
Muludja		Lions	Fitzroy Oval, Fitzroy Crossing	2018	2018–	1	2026
Noonkanbah-Yungngora (Mejerrikan 2005, Nyikina 2011-12)		Blues	Fitzroy Oval, Fitzroy Crossing	1994	1994–	5	2000, 2007, 2015, 2017, 2019
River		Roos	Fitzroy Oval, Fitzroy Crossing	2004	2004-?, 2025-	0	-
Wangkatjunka		Crows	Fitzroy Oval, Fitzroy Crossing	1996	1996–2012, 2014–	1	2018

== Former clubs ==
Club	Colours	Nickname	Home ground	Est.	Years in CKFL	CKFL Premierships		Fate
Club	Colours	Nickname	Home ground	Est.	Years in CKFL	Total	Years	Fate
Bungarti		Crocs	Fitzroy Oval, Fitzroy Crossing	2009	2009–2013	0	-	Folded
Derby [1]	(1991-97)(1998-2002)	Saints	Derby Oval, Derby	1991	1991–2002	1	1998	Merged with Spinifex to form Derby Lightning in West Kimberley FA in 2003
Derby [2]		Tigers	Derby Oval, Derby	1991	1991–1997	2	1992, 1993	Folded
Derby [3]		Demons	Derby Oval, Derby	2008	2008	0	-	Folded
Eight Mile		Saints	Fitzroy Oval, Fitzroy Crossing	2007	2007	0	-	Folded
Fitzroy		Hawks	Fitzroy Oval, Fitzroy Crossing	2015	2015	0	-	Folded
Junjuwa (Fitzoy Crossing 1993-97, 2006-10, 2013-14; Bunuba 2002-05)	(1993-97)(1998-2017)	Magpies	Fitzroy Oval, Fitzroy Crossing	1993	1993–2010, 2013–2014, 2016–2017	7	1994, 1995, 1996, 1997, 2001, 2003, 2016	Folded after 2017 season
Looma		Eagles	Derby Oval, Derby	1992	1992–2005	3	2002, 2004, 2005	Moved to West Kimberley FA in 2006
Mowanjum		Hawks	Derby Oval, Derby	1991	1991–2002, 2018–2019	1	1991	Folded after 2019 season
Spinifex		Cats	Derby Oval, Derby	1998	1998–2002	0	-	Merged with Derby Saints to form Derby Lightning in West Kimberley FA in 2003
West Kimberley		Suns	Fitzroy Oval, Fitzroy Crossing	2016	2016	0	-	Folded
Yakanarra (Walmatjarri 2003-05; Djugerari 2007-10, 2017)	(1998-2006)(2007-10, 2017)(2011-16, 2019)	Dockers	Fitzroy Oval, Fitzroy Crossing	1998	1998–2017, 2019-2022	3	1999, 2008, 2010	Folded after 2022 season
Yiyili (Goonian 2007)	(1998-2007)(2009-17)	Tigers	Fitzroy Oval, Fitzroy Crossing	1998	1998–2003, 2005–2007, 2009–2014, 2017	2	2006, 2011	Recess between 2017-20. Re-formed in East Kimberley FL in 2021.

== Grand final results ==
Year	Premiers	Score	Runners up	Score
1991	Mowanjum Hawks	15.9 (99)	Derby Bulldogs	9.15 (69)
1992	Derby Tigers	15.6 (96)	Mowanjum Hawks	6.3 (39)
1993	Derby Tigers	17.7 (109)	Derby Bulldogs	6.5 (41)
1994	Fitzroy Crossing Crocs	8.21 (69)	Derby Tigers	8.12 (60)
1995	Fitzroy Crossing Crocs	17.16 (118)	Derby Bulldogs	7.13 (55)
1996	Fitzroy Crossing Crocs	23.11 (149)	Nookanbah Blues	9.4 (58)
1997	Fitzroy Crossing Crocs	10.7 (67)	Derby Bulldogs	9.7 (61)
1998	Derby Saints	8.8 (56)	Yakanarra Dockers	6.8 (44)
1999	Yakanarra Dockers	8.9 (57)	Derby Saints	6.10 (46)
2000	Noonkanbah Blues	10.5 (65)	Junjuwa Magpies	4.11 (35)
2001	Junjuwa Magpies	7.8 (50)	Nookanbah Blues	5.7 (37)
2002	Looma Eagles	8.10 (58)	Bunuba Magpies	9.2 (56)
2003	Bunuba Magpies	9.7 (61)	Looma Eagles	6.7 (43)
2004	Looma Eagles	7.8 (50)	Nookanbah Blues	6.6 (42)
2005	Looma Eagles	9.6 (60)	Nookanbah Blues	7.9 (51)
2006	Yiyili Power	11.8 (74)	Fitzroy Crossing Magpies	7.7 (49)
2007	Noonkanbah Blues	7.13 (55)	Djugerari Bombers	8.5 (53)
2008	Djugerari Bombers	15.8 (98)	Bayulu Bulldogs	13.15 (93)
2009	Bayulu Bulldogs	12.8 (80)	Djugerari Bombers	11.4 (70)
2010	Djugerari Bombers	12.11 (83)	Bayulu Bulldogs	12.7 (79)
2011	Yiyili Tigers	11.8 (74)	Wangkatjunka Crows	9.9 (63)
2012	Bayulu Bulldogs	8.8 (56)	Noonkanbah Blues	8.5 (53)
2013	Bayulu Bulldogs	10.15 (75)	Noonkanbah Blues	10.4 (64)
2014	Bayulu Bulldogs	16.11 (107)	Noonkanbah Blues	10.9 (69)
2015	Noonkanbah Blues	14.10 (94)	Yakanarra Dockers	8.6 (54)
2016	Junjuwa Magpies	10.8 (68)	Bayulu Bulldogs	10.6 (66)
2017	Noonkanbah Blues	11.12 (78)	Bayulu Bulldogs	9.3 (57)
2018	Wangkatjungka Crows	12.4 (76)	Noonkanbah Blues	9.8 (62)
2019	Noonkanbah Blues	13.12 (90)	Muludja Lions	12.4 (76)
2020	No competition due to COVID-19 pandemic			
2021	No competition due to COVID-19 pandemic			
2022	Finals not held			
2023	CKFL in recess			
2024	CKFL in recess			
2025	Bayulu Bulldogs	18.5 (113)	Muludja Lions	12.8 (80)
2026	Muludja Lions	17.10 (112)	Noonkanbah-Yungngora Blues	12.8 (80)

Source: Records sourced from West Australian Country Football League Annual Reports

== 2024 Ladder ==
Central Kimberley	Wins	Byes	Losses	Draws	For	Against	%	Pts	Final	Team	G	B	Pts	Team	G	B	Pts
Kadjina Cats	8	0	2	0	558	359	155.43%	32	1st Semi	Noonkanbah Blues	9	8	62	Bayulu Bulldogs	9	6	60
Wangkatjunka Crows	6	0	4	0	455	358	127.09%	24	2nd Semi	Kadjina Cats	7	3	45	Wangkatjungka Crows	6	6	42
Bayulu Bulldogs	6	0	4	0	514	484	106.20%	24	Preliminary	Noonkanbah Blues	10	8	68	Wangkatjungka Crows	6	12	48
Noonkanbah Blues	5	0	5	0	544	395	137.72%	20	Grand	Kadjina Cats	7	8	50	Noonkanbah Blues	5	5	35
Muludja Lions	3	0	7	0	426	539	79.04%	12									
River Roos	2	0	8	0	324	691	46.89%	8									

== Website ==
- League website
