= Avon Football Association =

Avon Football Association
Established	1959
Teams	7
2026 premiers	Cunderdin
Most premierships	14 – Cunderdin

The Avon Football and Netball Association is an Australian Rules football and Netball competition located in the Avon Valley region of country Western Australia.

== History ==
The AFA was formed in 1959 through the merger of the East Avon FA (EAFA) and Avon Valley FA (AVFA).

In 1952, the AVFA applied to enter a team in the Perth-based Western Australian National Football League (WANFL). The WANFL secretary Billy Orr suggested in 1954 that the AVFA should merge with the EAFA and the Goomalling and District Football Association (GDFA) to form a stronger league in line with the newly created South West Football League (SWFL). However, the GDFA rejected the suggestion on the grounds that it would weaken local clubs and would result in too-long travelling times. The AVFA and EAFA met in 1954 to discuss the merger proposal and the possibly of fielding a team in the WANFL.

== Clubs ==
=== Locations ===
Locations of the 2025 Avon FA clubs

=== Current ===
Club	Colours	Nickname	Home ground	Former League	Est.	Years in AFA	League Premierships	
Club	Colours	Nickname	Home ground	Former League	Est.	Years in AFA	Total	Years
Beverley		Redbacks	Beverley Showgrounds, Beverley	AVFA	1896	1959-	9	1960, 1961, 1973, 1976, 1992, 1996, 2003, 2010, 2012
Cunderdin		Magpies	Cunderdin Oval, Cunderdin	EAFA		1959-	14	1964, 1965, 1975, 1977, 1978, 1985, 1986, 1987, 2014, 2021, 2022, 2023, 2025, 2026
Federals		Feds	Henry Street Oval, Northam	AVFA	1900	1959-	5	2000, 2001, 2005, 2006, 2015
Kellerberrin-Tammin		Kats	Kellerberrin Sports Ground, Kellerberrin and Tammin Football Ground, Tammin	–	1995	1995-	7	1998, 2004, 2011, 2013, 2016, 2017, 2019
Quairading		Bulls	Quairading Showgrounds, Quairading	EAFA		1959-	9	1962, 1974, 1979, 1990, 1991, 1994, 1997, 2008, 2024
Railways		Bombers	Henry Street Oval, Northam	–	1968	1968-	7	1969, 1984, 1995, 1999, 2007, 2009, 2018
York		Roos	Forrest Oval, York	AVFA		1959-	4	1983, 1988, 1993, 2002

=== Former ===
Club	Colours	Nickname	Home ground	Former League	Est.	Years in AFA	Premierships		Fate
Club	Colours	Nickname	Home ground	Former League	Est.	Years in AFA	Total	Years	Fate
Brookton		Bombers	Brookton Oval, Brookton	CFA		1971-1995	3	1980, 1981, 1982	Merged with Pingelly to form Brookton-Pingelly in the Upper Great Southern FL in 1996
Kellerberrin	(1960s)(1970s)(?-1994)	Cats	Kellerberrin Sports Ground, Kellerberrin	EAFA		1959-1994	2	1971, 1972	Merged with Tammin to form Kellerberrin-Tammin in 1995
Meckering		Tigers	Meckering Showgrounds, Meckering	EAFA		1959-1970	3	1963, 1967, 1968	Folded in 1970
Tammin		Rams	Tammin Football Ground, Tammin	EAFA		1959-1994	3	1966, 1970, 1989	Merged with Kellerberrin to form Kellerberrin-Tammin in 1995
Towns			Jubilee Oval, Northam	AVFA		1959-1967	0	-	Merged with Unions to form Railways in 1968
Unions			Jubilee Oval, Northam	AVFA		1959-1967	1	1959	Merged with Towns to form Railways in 1968

== Grand final results ==
Year	Premiers	Score	Runners up	Score
1959	Unions	10.10 (70)	Meckering	4.4 (28)
1960	Beverley	16.11 (107)	Unions	5.10 (40)
1961	Beverley	12.13 (85)	Unions	5.7 (37)
1962	Quairading	13.8 (86)	Beverley	13.5 (83)
1963	Meckering	18.8 (116)	Beverley	12.17 (89)
1964	Cunderdin	12.12 (84)	Kellerberrin	6.9 (45)
1965	Cunderdin	16.10 (106)	Tammin	14.10 (94)
1966	Tammin	14.15 (99)	Cunderdin	7.10 (52)
1967	Meckering	12.18 (90)	Tammin	8.9 (57)
1968	Meckering	10.7 (67)	Quairading	9.6 (60)
1969	Railways	11.8 (74)	Meckering	8.12 (60)
1970	Tammin	16.14 (110)	Federals	13.18 (96)
1971	Kellerberrin	16.16 (112)	Tammin	11.14 (80)
1972	Kellerberrin	11.10 (76)	Quairading	11.4 (70)
1973	Beverley	14.23 (107)	Kellerberrin	13.12 (90)
1974	Quairading	19.13 (127)	Beverley	10.17 (77)
1975	Cunderdin	17.12 (114)	Quairading	15.10 (100)
1976	Beverley	6.13 (49)	Cunderdin	6.9 (45)
1977	Cunderdin	10.9 (69)	Beverley	9.12 (66)
1978	Cunderdin	18.7 (115)	Brookton	17.11 (113)
1979	Quairading	13.17 (95)	Brookton	11.9 (75)
1980	Brookton	10.13 (73)	Federals	10.8 (68)
1981	Brookton	23.15 (153)	Railways	18.10 (118)
1982	Brookton	16.16 (112)	Railways	11.5 (71)
1983	York	20.20 (140)	Tammin	18.13 (121)
1984	Railways	20.17 (137)	Brookton	11.12 (78)
1985	Cunderdin	16.13 (109)	Railways	9.18 (72)
1986	Cunderdin	21.8 (134)	Beverley	15.16 (106)
1987	Cunderdin		Tammin	
1988	York	17.12 (114)	Cunderdin	12.8 (80)
1989	Tammin	10.11 (71)	Railways	7.8 (50)
1990	Quairading	18.23 (131)	Federals	10.4 (64)
1991	Quairading	22.19 (151)	Kellerberrin	17.8 (110)
1992	Beverley	17.12 (114)	Quairading	9.8 (62)
1993	York	12.9 (81)	Railways	5.20 (50)
1994	Quairading	12.8 (80)	Beverley	6.10 (46)
1995	Railways	12.16 (88)	Quairading	10.3 (63)
1996	Beverley	10.12 (72)	Federals	6.9 (45)
1997	Quairading	8.14 (62); 11.7 (73)	Cunderdin	9.8 (62); 9.14 (68)
1998	Kellerberrin-Tammin	10.16 (76)	Beverley	9.9 (63)
1999	Railways	10.16 (76)	Kellerberrin-Tammin	9.11 (65)
2000	Federals	9.19 (73)	Railways	8.12 (60)
2001	Federals	16.8 (104)	Railways	9.11 (65)
2002	York	14.12 (96)	Quairading	12.7 (79)
2003	Beverley	12.11 (83)	Railways	10.10 (70)
2004	Kellerberrin-Tammin	19.4 (118)	Cunderdin	7.11 (53)
2005	Federals	15.13 (103)	Beverley	12.6 (78)
2006	Federals	15.11 (101)	Railways	11.7 (73)
2007	Railways	15.12 (102)	Quairading	10.13 (73)
2008	Quairading	11.12 (78)	Railways	10.14 (74)
2009	Railways	17.11 (113)	Kellerberrin-Tammin	4.13 (37)
2010	Beverley	12.3 (75)	Quairading	6.11 (47)
2011	Kellerberrin-Tammin	9.14 (68)	Federals	9.10 (64)
2012	Beverley	13.14 (92)	Kellerberrin-Tammin	10.17 (77)
2013	Kellerberrin-Tammin	11.13 (79)	Beverley	9.14 (68)
2014	Cunderdin	20.18 (138)	Railways	17.10 (112)
2015	Federals	16.10 (106)	Beverley	12.9 (81)
2016	Kellerberrin-Tammin	9.10 (64)	York	7.5 (47)
2017	Kellerberrin-Tammin	14.13 (97)	Federals	12.9 (81)
2018	Railways	8.9 (57)	Kellerberrin-Tammin	6.8 (44)
2019	Kellerberrin-Tammin	9.20 (74)	Federals	8.9 (57)
2021	Cunderdin	8.16 (64)	Quairading	7.5 (47)
2022	Cunderdin	12.16 (88)	Kellerberrin-Tammin	6.7 (43)
2023	Cunderdin	7.13 (55)	Quairading	6.5 (41)
2024	Quairading	10.6 (66)	Cunderdin	9.8 (62)
2025	Cunderdin	8.13 (61)	Quairading	7.6 (48)
2026	Cunderdin	10.7 (67)	Railways	5.9 (39)

Scores sourced from Northam Advertiser and The West Australian newspapers

== Ladders ==
=== 2002 ladder ===
Avon	Wins	Byes	Losses	Draws	For	Against	%	Pts	Final	Team	G	B	Pts	Team	G	B	Pts
Federals	11	0	3	0	1242	994	124.95%	44	1st semi	York	11	8	74	Beverley	6	14	50
Quairading	10	0	4	0	1201	1064	112.88%	40	2nd semi	Quairading	11	13	79	Federals	11	12	78
York	9	0	5	0	1164	1020	114.12%	36	Preliminary	York	9	11	65	Federals	5	9	39
Beverley	8	0	6	0	1181	1165	101.37%	32	Grand	York	14	12	96	Quairading	12	7	79
Kellerberrin/Tammin	7	0	7	0	1289	1104	116.76%	28									
Railways	2	0	12	0	1010	1282	78.78%	8									
Cunderdin	2	0	12	0	904	1362	66.37%	8									

=== 2003 ladder ===
Avon	Wins	Byes	Losses	Draws	For	Against	%	Pts	Final	Team	G	B	Pts	Team	G	B	Pts
Beverley	13	0	1	0	1305	751	173.77%	52	1st semi	York	10	11	71	Cunderdin	6	15	51
Railways	10	0	4	0	1250	975	128.21%	40	2nd semi	Beverley	16	9	105	Railways	11	14	80
Cunderdin	7	0	7	0	1131	994	113.78%	28	Preliminary	Railways	17	15	117	York	8	7	55
York	7	0	7	0	837	1148	72.91%	28	Grand	Beverley	12	11	83	Railways	10	10	70
Kellerberrin/Tammin	6	0	8	0	1179	1097	107.47%	24									
Quairading	5	0	9	0	1233	1185	104.05%	20									
Federals	1	0	13	0	740	1525	48.52%	4									

=== 2004 ladder ===
Avon	Wins	Byes	Losses	Draws	For	Against	%	Pts	Final	Team	G	B	Pts	Team	G	B	Pts
Cunderdin	9	0	4	1	1190	1036	114.86%	38	1st semi	Railways	13	13	91	Beverley	7	17	59
Kellerberrin/Tammin	9	0	5	0	1396	1176	118.71%	36	2nd semi	Kellerberrin/Tammin	18	15	123	Cunderdin	11	8	74
Railways	9	0	5	0	1336	1165	114.68%	36	Preliminary	Cunderdin	13	8	86	Railways	11	14	80
Beverley	8	0	6	0	1207	944	127.86%	32	Grand	Kellerberrin/Tammin	19	4	118	Cunderdin	7	11	53
Quairading	7	0	7	0	1120	1181	94.83%	28									
Federals	5	0	8	1	1077	1091	98.72%	22									
York	1	0	13	0	822	1555	52.86%	4									

=== 2005 ladder ===
Avon	Wins	Byes	Losses	Draws	For	Against	%	Pts	Final	Team	G	B	Pts	Team	G	B	Pts
Beverley	12	0	2	0	1490	972	153.29%	48	1st semi	Railways	10	13	73	Kellerberrin/Tammin	10	12	72
Federals	11	0	3	0	1649	967	170.53%	44	2nd semi	Federals	21	23	149	Beverley	1	5	11
Railways	8	0	6	0	1334	1021	130.66%	32	Preliminary	Beverley	13	18	96	Railways	12	11	83
Kellerberrin/Tammin	7	0	7	0	1214	1226	99.02%	28	Grand	Federals	15	13	103	Beverley	12	6	78
Cunderdin	7	0	7	0	1136	1237	91.84%	28									
Quairading	3	0	11	0	947	1695	55.87%	12									
York	1	0	13	0	1000	1652	60.53%	4									

=== 2006 ladder ===
Avon	Wins	Byes	Losses	Draws	For	Against	%	Pts	Final	Team	G	B	Pts	Team	G	B	Pts
Railways	14	0	0	0	2084	705	295.60%	56	1st semi	Federals	25	13	163	Quairading	6	6	42
York	11	0	3	0	1570	1098	142.99%	44	2nd semi	Railways	19	16	130	York	8	4	52
Federals	9	0	4	1	1364	1345	101.41%	38	Preliminary	Federals	26	14	170	York	12	6	78
Quairading	6	0	7	1	1199	1450	82.69%	26	Grand	Federals	15	11	101	Railways	11	7	73
Kellerberrin/Tammin	5	0	9	0	999	1504	66.42%	20									
Beverley	2	0	12	0	897	1594	56.27%	8									
Cunderdin	1	0	13	0	980	1397	70.15%	4									

=== 2007 ladder ===
Avon	Wins	Byes	Losses	Draws	For	Against	%	Pts	Final	Team	G	B	Pts	Team	G	B	Pts
Railways	14	0	0	0	1634	816	200.25%	56	1st semi	Cunderdin	11	12	78	Kellerberrin/Tammin	3	8	26
Quairading	10	0	4	0	1341	984	136.28%	40	2nd semi	Railways	18	13	121	Quairading	13	12	90
Kellerberrin/Tammin	8	0	6	0	1294	1069	121.05%	32	Preliminary	Quairading	11	20	86	Cunderdin	10	15	75
Cunderdin	7	0	7	0	1081	1139	94.91%	28	Grand	Railways	15	12	102	Quairading	10	13	73
Federals	6	0	8	0	1389	1293	107.42%	24									
Beverley	2	0	12	0	785	1514	51.85%	8									
York	2	0	12	0	774	1483	52.19%	8									

=== 2008 ladder ===
Avon	Wins	Byes	Losses	Draws	For	Against	%	Pts	Final	Team	G	B	Pts	Team	G	B	Pts
Railways	14	0	0	0	1769	890	198.76%	56	1st semi	Federals	15	13	103	Kellerberrin/Tammin	11	10	76
Quairading	12	0	2	0	1627	1053	154.51%	48	2nd semi	Quairading	15	14	104	Railways	12	11	83
Kellerberrin/Tammin	8	0	6	0	1671	1159	144.18%	32	Preliminary	Railways	17	11	113	Federals	13	13	91
Federals	7	0	7	0	1664	1324	125.68%	28	Grand	Quairading	11	12	78	Railways	10	14	74
York	4	0	10	0	1013	1626	62.30%	16									
Beverley	4	0	10	0	976	1633	59.77%	16									
Cunderdin	0	0	14	0	837	1872	44.71%	0									

=== 2009 ladder ===
Avon	Wins	Byes	Losses	Draws	For	Against	%	Pts	Final	Team	G	B	Pts	Team	G	B	Pts
Railways	12	0	2	0	1840	834	220.62%	48	1st semi	Quairading	14	14	98	York	14	12	96
Kellerberrin/Tammin	12	0	2	0	1422	1002	141.92%	48	2nd semi	Railways	20	10	130	Kellerberrin/Tammin	14	7	91
Quairading	8	0	6	0	1291	1217	106.08%	32	Preliminary	Kellerberrin/Tammin	14	12	96	Quairading	14	6	90
York	8	0	6	0	1254	1305	96.09%	32	Grand	Railways	17	11	113	Kellerberrin/Tammin	4	13	37
Beverley	6	0	8	0	1168	1305	89.50%	24									
Federals	2	0	12	0	997	1525	65.38%	8									
Cunderdin	1	0	13	0	768	1552	49.48%	4									

=== 2010 ladder ===
Avon	Wins	Byes	Losses	Draws	For	Against	%	Pts	Final	Team	G	B	Pts	Team	G	B	Pts
Beverley	10	0	4	0	1326	1111	119.35%	40	1st semi	York	12	12	84	Kellerberrin/Tammin	16	12	108
Quairading	9	0	5	0	1312	1113	117.88%	36	2nd semi	Beverley	16	8	104	Quairading	10	12	72
York	8	0	6	0	1168	1263	92.48%	32	Preliminary	Quairading	15	13	103	Kellerberrin/Tammin	12	9	81
Kellerberrin/Tammin	7	0	7	0	1380	1174	117.55%	28	Grand	Beverley	12	3	75	Quairading	6	11	47
Cunderdin	6	0	8	0	1303	1382	94.28%	24									
Railways	5	0	9	0	1221	1368	89.25%	20									
Federals	4	0	10	0	1099	1398	78.61%	16									

=== 2011 ladder ===
Avon	Wins	Byes	Losses	Draws	For	Against	%	Pts	Final	Team	G	B	Pts	Team	G	B	Pts
Kellerberrin/Tammin	11	0	3	0	1693	952	177.84%	44	1st semi	Beverley	10	12	72	Cunderdin	10	8	68
Federals	10	0	3	1	1525	1184	128.80%	42	2nd semi	Federals	18	9	117	Kellerberrin/Tammin	15	15	105
Beverley	9	0	4	1	1364	1164	117.18%	38	Preliminary	Kellerberrin/Tammin	14	9	93	Beverley	12	11	83
Cunderdin	7	0	7	0	1477	1236	119.50%	28	Grand	Kellerberrin/Tammin	9	14	68	Federals	9	10	64
Quairading	7	0	7	0	1356	1272	106.60%	28									
York	4	0	10	0	1157	1395	82.94%	16									
Railways	0	0	14	0	651	2020	32.23%	0									

=== 2012 ladder ===
Avon	Wins	Byes	Losses	Draws	For	Against	%	Pts	Final	Team	G	B	Pts	Team	G	B	Pts
Kellerberrin/Tammin	13	0	1	0	2028	840	241.43%	52	1st semi	Federals	14	26	110	York	10	13	73
Beverley	11	0	3	0	1605	967	165.98%	44	2nd semi	Beverley	17	7	109	Kellerberrin/Tammin	13	9	87
Federals	9	0	5	0	1596	1099	145.22%	36	Preliminary	Kellerberrin/Tammin	18	8	116	Federals	10	9	69
York	7	0	7	0	1020	1522	67.02%	28	Grand	Beverley	13	14	92	Kellerberrin/Tammin	10	17	77
Cunderdin	6	0	8	0	1286	1355	94.91%	24									
Railways	2	0	12	0	1019	1783	57.15%	8									
Quairading	1	0	13	0	860	1848	46.54%	4									

=== 2013 ladder ===
Avon	Wins	Byes	Losses	Draws	For	Against	%	Pts	Final	Team	G	B	Pts	Team	G	B	Pts
Beverley	13	0	1	0	1611	978	164.72%	52	1st semi	Cunderdin	17	19	121	Railways	14	7	91
Kellerberrin/Tammin	9	0	5	0	1361	1101	123.61%	36	2nd semi	Kellerberrin/Tammin	10	13	73	Beverley	7	14	56
Railways	7	0	7	0	1583	1230	128.70%	28	Preliminary	Beverley	15	13	103	Cunderdin	12	12	84
Cunderdin	7	0	7	0	1400	1323	105.82%	28	Grand	Kellerberrin/Tammin	13	11	89	Beverley	9	14	68
Federals	7	0	7	0	1232	1359	90.65%	28									
York	4	0	10	0	1088	1418	76.73%	16									
Quairading	2	0	12	0	806	1672	48.21%	8									

=== 2014 ladder ===
Avon	Wins	Byes	Losses	Draws	For	Against	%	Pts	Final	Team	G	B	Pts	Team	G	B	Pts
Cunderdin	11	0	3	0	1804	1034	174.47%	44	1st semi	Railways	17	5	107	Beverley	8	18	66
Federals	10	0	4	0	1521	1080	140.83%	40	2nd semi	Cunderdin	16	15	111	Federals	12	8	80
Beverley	10	0	4	0	1496	1013	147.68%	40	Preliminary	Railways	12	21	93	Federals	13	6	84
Railways	7	0	7	0	1463	1446	101.18%	28	Grand	Cunderdin	20	18	138	Railways	17	10	112
York	6	0	8	0	1047	1385	75.60%	24									
Kellerberrin/Tammin	5	0	9	0	1175	1401	83.87%	20									
Quairading	0	0	14	0	876	2023	43.30%	0									

=== 2015 ladder ===
Avon	Wins	Byes	Losses	Draws	For	Against	%	Pts	Final	Team	G	B	Pts	Team	G	B	Pts
Federals	9	0	4	1	1461	1126	129.75%	38	1st semi	Cunderdin	13	9	87	Kellerberrin/Tammin	7	11	53
Beverley	9	0	5	0	1403	1057	132.73%	36	2nd semi	Federals	12	11	83	Beverley	12	5	77
Kellerberrin/Tammin	9	0	5	0	1331	1063	125.21%	36	Preliminary	Beverley	17	6	108	Cunderdin	8	12	60
Cunderdin	8	0	5	1	1437	943	152.39%	34	Grand	Federals	16	10	106	Beverley	12	9	81
York	6	0	8	0	1204	1291	93.26%	24									
Railways	5	0	9	0	1393	1817	76.66%	20									
Quairading	2	0	12	0	982	1914	51.31%	8									

=== 2016 ladder ===
Avon	Wins	Byes	Losses	Draws	For	Against	%	Pts	Final	Team	G	B	Pts	Team	G	B	Pts
York	11	0	3	0	1364	1168	116.78%	44	1st semi	Kellerberrin/Tammin	8	14	62	Beverley	4	5	29
Cunderdin	10	0	4	0	1736	916	189.52%	40	2nd semi	York	12	8	80	Cunderdin	8	12	60
Kellerberrin/Tammin	9	0	5	0	1427	1001	142.56%	36	Preliminary	Kellerberrin/Tammin	9	14	68	Cunderdin	9	4	58
Beverley	8	0	6	0	1141	1150	99.22%	32	Grand	Kellerberrin/Tammin	9	10	64	York	7	5	47
Federals	4	0	10	0	1208	1596	75.69%	16									
Railways	4	0	10	0	1146	1802	63.60%	16									
Quairading	3	0	11	0	1250	1639	76.27%	12									

=== 2017 ladder ===
Avon	Wins	Byes	Losses	Draws	For	Against	%	Pts	Final	Team	G	B	Pts	Team	G	B	Pts
Kellerberrin/Tammin	12	0	2	0	1492	836	178.47%	48	1st semi	Railways	8	19	67	Beverley	8	11	59
Federals	10	0	4	0	1623	1100	147.55%	40	2nd semi	Kellerberrin/Tammin	17	11	113	Federals	13	14	92
Railways	10	0	4	0	1439	1037	138.77%	40	Preliminary	Federals	17	17	119	Railways	14	17	101
Beverley	8	0	6	0	1204	1107	108.76%	32	Grand	Kellerberrin/Tammin	14	13	97	Federals	12	9	81
Quairading	4	0	10	0	910	1486	61.24%	16									
York	3	0	11	0	1002	1605	62.43%	12									
Cunderdin	2	0	12	0	874	1373	63.66%	8									

== Stacey Medal (League - Best and Fairest) ==
Year	Name	Club
1959	E.Stone	Quairading
1960	H.Wansbrough	Beverley
1961	J.Caffell	Tammin
1962	J.Dennis	Cunderdin
1963	J.Dennis (2)	Cunderdin
1964	J.Dennis (3)	Cunderdin
1965	G.Annadale	Meckering
1966	E.Hadlow	Quairading
1967	N.Dennis	Cunderdin
1968	N.Dennis (2)	Cunderdin
1969	N.Dennis (3)	Cunderdin
1970	K.Miller	Tammin
1971	W.Langdon	Kellerberrin
1972	D.Chatfield	Tammin
1973	J.McKay	Cunderdin
1974	J.Doyle	Beverley
1975	G.Mourish	Beverley
1976	G.Mourish (2)	Beverley
1977	J.Merillo	Brookton
1978	K.Coleman	Cunderdin
1979	G.Mourish (3)	Beverley
1980	M.Cummins	York
1981	P.Webb P.Phillpott	York Tammin
1982	P.Webb (2)	York
1983	D.Kickett	Tammin
1984	T.Coleman	Cunderdin
1985	M.Skehan	York
1986	M.Davis	Brookton
1987	M.Capp	Kellerberrin
1988	B.Williamson	Brookton
1989	M.Morris P.Amonini A.Maher	Railways Railways York
1990	W.Ryder	Federal
1991	P.Hill	York
1992	S.Powell	Quairading
1993	Ch.Yarren	York
1994	M.Edwards	Beverley
1995	D.Thompson	Keller-Tammin
1996	M.Edwards (2)	Beverley
1997	D.Squires	Quairading
1998	R.Hudson S.Young C.Batemen R.Med	Beverley Beverley York Quairading
1999	R.Hudson	Beverley
2000	J.Ryder	Federal
2001	S.Bilcich	York
2002	D.Squires (2)	Quairading
2003	C.Boyle M.Coulthart	York Keller-Tammin
2004	C.Denny	Quairading
2005	W.Ryder	Railways
2006	J.Sprigg	Railways
2007	J.Gordon	Railways
2008	M.Stevens	Quairading
2009	J.Thompson	Railways
2010	T.Richter	Quairading
2011	M.Smith	Federal
2012	J.Venturini	Keller-Tammin
2013	Tom Atkinson Troy Skilton	York Cunderdin
2014	J.Turner	Beverley
2015	T.Skilton (2)	Cunderdin
2016	B.McNamara	York
2017	B.Robinson J.Kaylor-Thomson S.Cacetta	Federal Federal Railways
2018	S.Cacetta (2)	Railways
2019	R.Maldenis	Quairading
2021	J.Levien R.Maldenis	Cunderdin
2022	M.Rogers	Cunderdin
2023	B.Rushforth	Quairading
2024	B.Rushforth (2)	Quairading
2025	K.Fullgrabe	Cunderdin
2026	K.Fullgrabe (2)	Cunderdin
