= Beverley Football Club =

Beverley

Names
- Full name: Beverley Football & Netball Club
- Nickname: Redbacks

Club details
- Founded: 1959; 66 years ago
- Colours: Red Black
- Competition: Avon Football Association
- Premierships: 9
- Ground: Beverley Oval

Uniforms
Home

Other information
- Official website: Beverley Redbacks

Beverley Football Club is an Australian rules football club based in Beverley, Western Australia. The club has been associated with the Avon Football Association (AFA) since its inception in 1959.

== History ==
Beverley had a highly successful period immediately following its formation in 1959, winning the AFA premiership in both 1960 and 1961. Another successful period followed in the middle of the 1970s with premierships being won in 1973 and 1976. After a relatively long stretch without honours, Beverley again won premierships in 1992, 1996 and then 2003.

In 2009, the League team finished in second to last place with six wins, and then in 2010, the league side started with two wins from six games as they were unable to win away from home. Beverley then went on to win the remaining 8 games of the season and eventually went on to win the premiership finishing with 10 wins in a row. The reserves side finished last with just the one win which happened to be their first in three years.

In 2011, the League team came third, making the finals and being eliminated in the preliminaries by Kellerberrin/Tammin (who went on to win the premiership). It was a remarkable effort given Beverley lost 11 players from the 2010 premiership side. The reserves side had a massive improvement in season 2011 finishing 4th with 8 wins and 6 losses to their name. It was the first time the side had made the finals since 2004. They were knocked out by Cunderdin in the first semi final.

In 2012, Beverley made the Grand Final and defeated the Kellerberrin/Tammin side in Northam. It was the 9th Premiership for the League team making it the winner of the most premierships in the competition.

Beverley's most recent senior grade grand final appearance came in 2015, but ended in defeat at the hands of Northam Federals.

== Honours ==
Senior AFA Premierships: 1960-1, 1973, 1976, 1992, 1996, 2003, 2010, 2012 (9 total)
