= West Kimberley Football Association =

Australian rules football competition

West Kimberley Football League
- Current season, competition or edition: 2025 WKFA Season
- Formerly: Broome Football Association
- Sport: Australian rules football
- Founded: 1921
- No. of teams: 6 Men's, 5 Women's
- Country: Australia
- Venue: Broome, Western Australia
- Most recent champions: Men's: Towns (25); Women's: Towns (2026)
- Most titles: Towns (24)
- Sponsor: Kimberley Physiotherapy
- Website: wfkl.asn.au

The West Kimberley Football Association is an Australian rules football competition in the far North West of Western Australia.

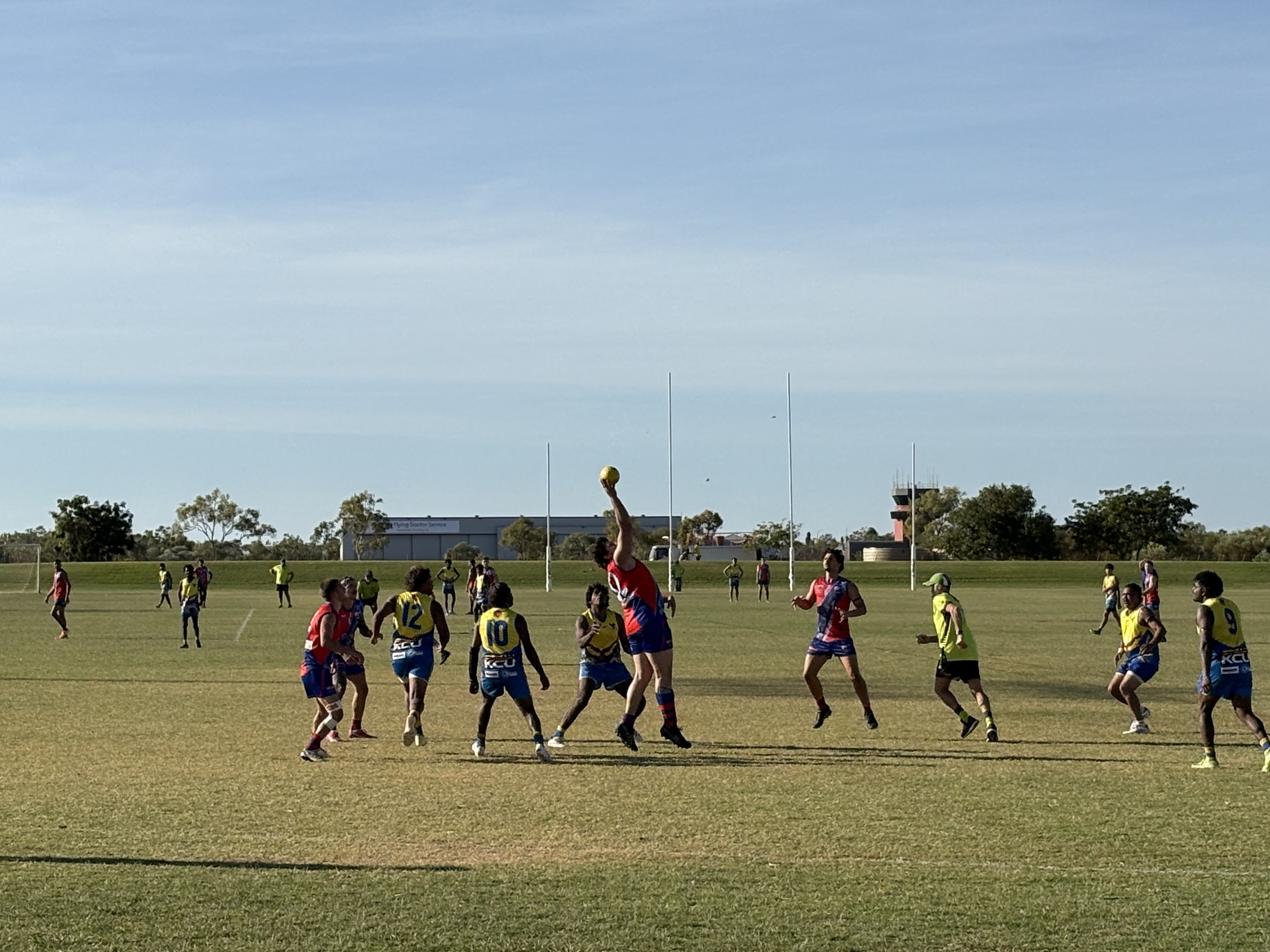
A match in the West Kimberley Football League between Towns and Looma Eagles

The league covers an area from Bidyadanga in the west to Derby in the east. Games are played during the day in Broome and Derby with the majority of games and all finals taking place on Haynes Oval in Broome. At the end of the 2005 season there were eight teams participating – Broome Bulls, Broome Saints, Towns, Bidyadanga Emus, Peninsula Bombers, Cable Beach Greenbacks, Derby Lightning and Mowanjum Hawks. In 2006 the Looma Eagles joined the competition after leaving the Central Kimberley Football League (CKFL).

== History ==
In 1921 the Broome Football Club was formed, local citizens signed up and two teams were formed. Using the residences of the players to divide the town in two. A line was drawn across the town and players living to the North of the line were zoned to North, and players living South of the line played for South. For six seasons this was the rule and it was a lopsided competition, South was the dominant team. In 1927 a redrawing of the zones resulted in two new teams, Marsh Rovers and the Wanderers. This was an attempt to revitalise the game in town but when the Great Depression hit it caused a downturn in economic activity and resulted in the lack of workers coming to town. Lack of workers meant lack of players and the game went into recess. 3 years later, in an attempt to revive the game the club returned to the original boundaries and origin teams. This lasted only a season and a half before the game was kaput.

After WWII there was an influx of workers to the town, The Japanese had bombed Broome during the war and the town needed rebuilding, The State and Federal Governments were involved and with the slogan of Populate or persist the game of Australian rules was revived. The first season was in 1949, three teams were formed, Commonwealth, Meatworks and Towns. This continued until 1955 when a fourth team was included, Broome Saints.

== Clubs ==
=== Locations ===
Locations of the West Kimberley FL clubs. All clubs except Bidyadanga and Derby play home games in Broome.

=== Current ===
Club	Colours	Nickname	Home Ground	Former League	Est.	Years in WKFL	WKFL Premierships	
Club	Colours	Nickname	Home Ground	Former League	Est.	Years in WKFL	Total	Years
Bidyadanga (La Grange 1985, 1989)		Emus	Bidyadanga Oval, Bidyadanga	–	1983	1983-1986, 1988	3	1990, 2004, 2016
Broome Bulls (Meatworks 1949-78, 1981-94, Demco 1979-80)		Bulls	Father McMahon and Nipper Roe Ovals, Broome	–	1949	1949-	14	1954, 1957, 1962, 1963, 1964, 1970, 1982, 1989, 1995, 1997, 1998, 1999, 2001, 2017,
Broome Saints		Saints	Father McMahon and Nipper Roe Ovals, Broome	–	1955	1955–	11	1960, 1965, 1967, 1971, 1972, 1973, 1979, 2005, 2006, 2010
Cable Beach (Nyul Nyul 1991-93)		Greenbacks	Father McMahon and Nipper Roe Ovals, Broome	–	1991	1991-	12	1996, 2007, 2009, 2011, 2012, 2014, 2015, 2019, 2021, 2022, 2023, 2025
Looma		Eagles	Father McMahon and Nipper Roe Ovals, Broome	CKFL	1992	2006–	2	2013, 2018
Towns		Falcons	Father McMahon and Nipper Roe Ovals, Broome	–	1949	1949–	25	1951, 1952, 1953, 1955, 1956, 1959, 1961, 1969, 1974, 1975, 1976, 1977, 1978, 1981, 1983, 1985, 1986, 1991, 1993, 1994, 2002, 2003, 2008, 2024, 2026

=== Former ===
Club	Colours	Nickname	Home Ground	Former League	Est.	Years in WKFL	WKFL Premierships		Fate
Club	Colours	Nickname	Home Ground	Former League	Est.	Years in WKFL	Total	Years	Fate
Bardi (Lombadina 1981-82, One Arm Point 1984)	Dark with light stripes on left side	Sharks	Father McMahon and Nipper Roe Ovals, Broome	–	1981	1981-1982, 1984, 1987-1993	1	1987	Folded after 1993 season
Commonwealth			Father McMahon and Nipper Roe Ovals, Broome	–	1949	1949-1959	1	1949	Folded after 1959 season
Derby Magpies	(1984-90)(1991)	Magpies	Derby Oval, Derby	–	1984	1984-1991	1	1984	Disbanded to form Derby FA after 1991 season
Derby Lightning		Lightning	Derby Oval, Derby	–	2003	2003-2005	0	-	Became Derby Tigers in 2009
Derby Tigers		Tigers	Derby Oval, Derby	CKFL	1977	1977–1982, 2009-2025	0	-	Entered recess after 2025 season
Marsh Rovers	Light with dark yoke		Derby Oval, Derby	DFA	1977	?-1982	0	-	Left league after 1982 season. Merged with Derby Tigers to form Derby Hawks in 1984
Mowanjum		Hawks	Derby Oval, Derby	CKFL		2005	0	-	Returned to Central Kimberley FL in 2006
North Broome	(1921-?)(1927)			–	1921	1921-1927, 1933-1934	3	1921, 1926, 1933	Replaced by Rovers and Wanderers one game into 1927 season. Folded after 1934 season
Peninsula Bombers (Beagle Bay 1976-98)		Bombers	Father McMahon and Nipper Roe Ovals, Broome	–	1976-	1976-2025	4	1980, 1988, 1992, 2000	Entered recess after 2025 season
Roos (Swans 1983)		Roos	Father McMahon and Nipper Roe Ovals, Broome	–	1983	1983-1987	0	-	Folded after 1987 season
Rovers				–	1927	1927-1928	1	1927	Folded after 1928 season
South Broome				–	1921	1921-1927, 1933-1934	5	1922, 1923, 1924, 1925, 1934	Replaced by Rovers and Wanderers one game into 1927 season. Folded after 1934 season
Warriors		Warriors	Father McMahon and Nipper Roe Ovals, Broome	–	1970	1970-1977	0	-	Folded after 1977 season
Wanderers				–	1927	1927-1928	1	1928	Folded after 1928 season

== Premierships ==
Year	Premier	Score	Runner-up	Notes
2026	Towns	12.5 (77) - 7.8 (50)	Cable Beach	
2025	Cable Beach	9.6 (60) - 6.6 (42)	Towns	
2024	Towns	10.2 (62) - 4.9 (33)	Cable Beach	
2023	Cable Beach	11.7 (73) - 10.4 (64)	Towns	
2022	Cable Beach	10.9 (69) - 9.8 (62)	Derby	
2021	Cable Beach	16.7 (103) - 8.7 (55)	Derby	
2020 - WKFL in recess due to COVID-19
2019	Cable Beach	12.6 (78) - 8.1 (49)	Bulls	
2018	Looma	12.10 (82) - 11.10 (76)	Cable Beach	
2017	Bulls	10.10 (70) - 10.4 (64)	Derby	
2016	Bidyadanga	8.8 (56) - 6.12 (48)	Looma	
2015	Cable Beach	15.9 (99) - 4.8 (32)	Bombers	
2014	Cable Beach	15.12 (102) - 2.3 (15)	Looma	
2013	Looma	14.12 (96) - 14.10 (94)	Cable Beach	
2012	Cable Beach	8.10 (58) - 7.10 (52)	Derby	
2011	Cable Beach	8.13 (67) - 8.9 (63)	Bombers	
2010	Saints	11.8 (74) - 9.9 (63)	Bombers	
2009	Cable Beach	9.8 (62) - 5.4 (34)	Bombers	
2008	Towns	7.4 (46) - 5.3 (33)	Saints	
2007	Cable Beach	10.9 (69) - 7.6 (48)	Towns	
2006	Saints	12.10 (82) - 7.8 (50)	Towns	
2005	Saints	10.17 (77) - 6.6 (42)	Bulls	
2004	Bidyadanga	5.12 (42) - 4.14 (38)	Towns	
2003	Towns	18.14 (122) - 10.5 (65)	Bidyadanga	
2002	Towns	7.14 (56) - 8.6 (54)	Saints	
2001	Bulls			
2000	Bombers			
1999	Bulls	11.6 (72) - 6.9 (45)	Bombers	
1998	Bulls	8.10 (58) - 5.10 (40)	Beagle Bay	
1997	Bulls	11.12 (78) - 9.12 (66)	Beagle Bay	
1996	Cable Beach	Margin: 18 points	Beagle Bay	
1995	Bulls	10.6 (66) - 7.3 (45)	Towns	
1994	Towns	11.12 (78) - 5.8 (38)	Bidyadanga	
1993	Towns			
1992	Beagle Bay	8.9 (57) - 7.8 (50)	Towns	
1991	Towns	13.10 (88) - 9.11 (65)	Beagle Bay	
1990	Bidyadanga	8.18 (66) - 9.9 (63)	Beagle Bay	
1989	Meatworks	23.12 (150) - 8.13 (61)	Bardi	
1988	Beagle Bay	Margin: 3 points	Bardi	
1987	Bardi	15.9 (99) - 9.12 (66)	Beagle Bay	
1986	Towns	16.3 (99) - 12.7 (79)	Beagle Bay	
1985	Towns		Roos	
1984	Derby	16.10 (106) - 11.8 (74)	Saints	
1983	Towns	Margin: 1 point	Saints	
1982	Meatworks		Beagle Bay	
1981	Towns		Saints	
1980	Beagle Bay		Towns	
1979	Saints	Margin: 11 points	Beagle Bay	
1978	Towns	17.16 (118) - 10.9 (79)	Derby	
1977	Towns	13.11 (89) - 9.16 (70)	Derby	
1976	Towns		Beagle Bay	
1975	Towns	Margin: 15 goals	Meatworks	
1974	Towns		Meatworks	
1973	Saints		Meatworks	
1972	Saints	7.12 (54) - 3.10 (34)	Meatworks	
1971	Saints			
1970	Meatworks			
1969	Towns			
1968 - WKFA in recess
1967	Saints			
1966	Saints			
1965	Saints			
1964	Meatworks			
1963	Meatworks			
1962	Meatworks		Saints	
1961	Towns		Saints	
1960	Saints		Towns	
1959	Towns			
1958	Commonwealth			
1957	Meatworks			
1956	Towns			
1955	Towns			
1954	Meatworks	15.10 (100) - 5.8 (38)	Towns	
1953	Towns	15.14 (104) - 8.4 (52)	Commonwealth	
1952	Towns	13.15 (93) - 11.10 (76)	Meatworks	
1951	Towns		Commonwealth	Grand Final drawn, Towns awarded premiership (not sure if there was a replay?
1950	Meatworks	30.19 (199) - 8.7 (55)	Towns	
1949	Commonwealth	10.19 (79) - 6.11 (47)	Towns	
1935-48 WKFA in recess
1934	South Broome		North Broome	
1933	North Broome		South Broome	
1929-32 WKFA in recess
1928	Wanderers	16.16 (112) - 9.10 (64)	Rovers	
1927	Rovers		Wanderers	Rovers won on forfeit as Wanderers could not field enough players
1926	North Broome	12.12 (84) - 8.4 (52)	South Broome	
1925	South Broome	8.15 (63) - 7.9 (51)	North Broome	
1924	South Broome	5.7 (37) - 4.10 (34)	North Broome	
1923	South Broome	8.16 (64) - 3.20 (44)	North Broome	
1922	South Broome	13.13 (91) - 3.10 (34)	North Broome	
1921	North Broome	6.13 (49) - 6.7 (43)	South Broome	

== WFKA Seasons ==
=== 2012 Season ===
Team	Wins	Byes	Losses	Draws	For	Against	%	Pts	Final	Team	G	B	Pts	Team	G	B	Pts
Cable Beach	11	0	2	1	1392	768	181.25%	46	1st semi	Derby Tigers	14	6	90	Towns	10	6	66
Towns	9	0	4	1	1221	818	149.27%	38	2nd semi	Cable Beach	15	5	95	Looma	9	5	59
Looma	9	0	5	0	1057	855	123.63%	36	Preliminary	Derby Tigers	10	8	68	Looma	6	8	44
Broome	8	0	6	0	1091	912	119.63%	32	Grand	Cable Beach	8	10	58	Derby Tigers	7	10	52
Derby	8	0	6	0	1107	995	111.26%	32									
Saints	5	0	7	2	951	935	101.71%	24									
Bidyadanga	2	0	12	0	825	1479	55.78%	8									
Peninsula	2	0	12	0	565	1500	37.67%	8									

=== 2013 Season ===
Team	Wins	Byes	Losses	Draws	For	Against	%	Pts	Final	Team	G	B	Pts	Team	G	B	Pts
Cable Beach	12	0	2	0	1509	760	198.55%	48	1st semi	Looma	24	10	154	Saints	7	4	46
Derby	11	0	3	0	1662	788	210.91%	44	2nd semi	Cable Beach	18	7	115	Derby	9	7	61
Looma	11	0	3	0	1447	889	162.77%	44	Preliminary	Looma	11	11	77	Derby	9	8	62
Saints	9	0	5	0	1369	1017	134.61%	36	Grand	Looma	14	12	96	Cable Beach	14	10	94
Bidyadanga	5	0	9	0	1215	1201	101.17%	20									
Broome	5	0	9	0	1077	1228	87.70%	20									
Towns	2	0	12	0	502	1788	28.08%	8									
Peninsula	1	0	13	0	681	1792	38.00%	4									

=== 2014 Season ===
Team	Wins	Byes	Losses	Draws	For	Against	%	Pts	Final	Team	G	B	Pts	Team	G	B	Pts
Cable Beach	13	0	1	0	1335	695	192.09%	52	1st semi	Derby	8	9	57	Bidyadanga	14	10	94
Looma	10	0	3	1	1201	790	152.03%	42	2nd semi	Cable Beach	13	8	86	Looma	13	6	84
Derby	9	0	4	1	1209	873	138.49%	38	Preliminary	Looma	12	8	80	Bidyadanga	12	5	77
Bidyadanga	8	0	4	2	1228	922	133.19%	36	Grand	Cable Beach	15	12	102	Looma	2	3	15
Saints	6	0	8	0	855	879	97.27%	24									
Broome	4	0	10	0	799	1175	68.00%	16									
Peninsula	3	0	11	0	720	1317	54.67%	12									
Towns	1	0	13	0	522	1344	38.84%	4									

=== 2015 Season ===
Team	Wins	Byes	Losses	Draws	For	Against	%	Pts	Final	Team	G	B	Pts	Team	G	B	Pts
Cable Beach	12	0	2	0	1351	560	241.25%	48	1st semi	Peninsula	10	6	66	Looma	5	14	44
Bidyadanga	12	0	2	0	1269	758	167.41%	48	2nd semi	Cable Beach	13	8	86	Bidyadanga	6	6	42
Looma	10	0	4	0	1143	689	165.89%	40	Preliminary	Peninsula	14	6	90	Bidyadanga	5	14	44
Peninsula	8	0	6	0	931	865	107.63%	32	Grand	Cable Beach	15	9	99	Peninsula	4	8	32
Derby	7	0	7	0	1112	840	132.38%	28									
Broome	5	0	9	0	713	1114	64.00%	20									
Towns	1	0	13	0	614	1147	53.53%	4									
Saints	1	0	13	0	520	1680	30.95%	4									

=== 2016 Season ===
Men's Competition

Premiers: Bidyadanga Emus

Bullen Medal (Best & Fairest): Angelo Thomas (Bidyadanga) & Hayden McLeod (Bulls)

Team	Wins	Byes	Losses	Draws	For	Against	%	Pts	Final	Team	G	B	Pts	Team	G	B	Pts
Bidyadanga	11	0	2	1	1229	734	167.44%	46	1st semi	Broome	8	12	60	Saints	6	8	44
Looma	10	0	4	0	1008	723	139.42%	40	2nd semi	Bidyadanga	12	6	78	Looma	8	6	54
Broome	10	0	4	0	909	684	132.89%	40	Preliminary	Looma	9	10	64	Broome	9	1	55
Saints	7	0	6	1	859	829	103.62%	30	Grand	Bidyadanga	8	8	56	Looma	6	12	48
Peninsula	6	0	6	2	1034	849	121.79%	28									
Cable Beach	7	0	7	0	916	855	107.13%	28									
Towns	2	0	12	0	618	1313	47.07%	8									
Derby	1	0	13	0	597	1183	50.46%	4									

=== 2017 Season ===
Men's Competition

Premiers: Broome Bulls

Bullen Medal (Best & Fairest): Wade Wundungin (Derby Tigers)

Team	Wins	Byes	Losses	Draws	For	Against	%	Pts	Final	Team	G	B	Pts	Team	G	B	Pts
Derby	11	0	3	0	1293	657	196.80%	44	1st semi	Bidyadanga	11	3	69	Cable Beach	8	11	59
Broome	11	0	3	0	1103	634	173.97%	44	2nd semi	Derby	9	6	60	Broome	6	8	44
Cable Beach	10	0	4	0	1210	732	165.30%	40	Preliminary	Looma	10	10	70	Bidyadanga	10	7	67
Bidyadanga	9	0	5	0	1060	816	129.90%	36	Grand	Broome	11	6	72	Derby	10	4	64
Looma	7	0	7	0	1071	800	133.88%	28									
Peninsula	6	0	8	0	1093	1137	96.13%	24									
Towns	2	0	12	0	663	1396	47.49%	8									
Saints	0	0	14	0	429	1750	24.51%	0									

=== 2020 Season ===
- Cancelled due to State Government travel restrictions.

=== 2021 Season ===
Men's Competition

Premiers: Cable Beach

Bullen Medal (Best & Fairest): Tristram Pigram (Saints)

Team	Wins	Byes	Losses	Draws	For	Against	%	Pts	Final	Team	G	B	Pts	Team	G	B	Pts
Cable Beach	14	0	1	0	1490	496	300.4%	52	1st semi	Bulls	9	5	59	Looma	7	9	51
Derby	12	0	2	0	1258	799	156.95%	48	2nd semi	Cable Beach	11	10	76	Derby	11	7	73
Looma	7	0	5	0	911	712	127.95%	34	Preliminary	Derby	15	8	98	Bulls	8	10	58
Bulls	8	0	6	0	850	887	95.83%	32	Grand	Cable Beach	16	7	103	Derby	8	7	55
Bidyadanga	6	0	6	0	1009	879	114.79%	30									
Peninsula	4	0	9	0	783	1052	74.43%	16									
Saints	3	0	11	0	786	1011	77.74%	12									
Towns	0	0	13	0	366	1617	22.63%	0									

Women's competition

West Kimberley	Wins	Byes	Losses	Draws	For	Against	%	Pts	Final	Team	G	B	Pts	Team	G	B	Pts
Cable Beach	14	0	0	0	719	132	544.70%	56	1st Semi	Looma	7	22	64	Peninsula Bombers	2	1	13
Towns	11	0	3	0	647	259	249.81%	44	2nd Semi	Cable Beach	10	5	65	Towns	6	1	37
Looma	8	0	5	1	495	308	160.71%	34	Preliminary	Looma	8	6	54	Towns	8	5	53
Peninsula Bombers	6	0	7	1	199	442	45.02%	26	Grand	Cable Beach	7	4	46	Looma	3	9	27
Broome Bulls	5	0	9	0	359	336	106.85%	20									
Bidyadanga Emus	5	0	9	0	259	653	39.66%	20									
Saints	3	0	11	0	176	431	40.84%	12									
Derby	3	0	11	0	304	353	86.12%	12									

=== 2022 Season ===
Men's Competition

Premiers: Cable Beach

Bullen Medal (Best & Fairest): Benjamin Goldie (Towns)

Team	Played	Wins	Losses	Draws	Byes	Forfeits	For	Against	Percentage	Pts	Final	Team	G	B	Pts	Team	G	B	Pts
Cable Beach	14	14	0	0	0	0	1189	374	317.91%	56	1st semi	Towns	11	3	69	Looma	10	12	72
Derby	13	11	2	0	0	0	1425	553	257.69%	46	2nd semi	Cable Beach	13	9	87	Derby	9	4	58
Towns	14	8	5	0	0	1	959	833	115.13%	32	Preliminary	Derby	18	9	117	Looma	9	5	59
Looma	13	7	6	0	0	0	896	881	101.70%	30	Grand	Cable Beach	10	9	69	Derby	9	8	62
Bulls	14	7	7	0	0	0	673	958	70.75%	28									
Saints	14	4	10	0	0	0	771	1057	72.94%	16									
Bidyadanga	14	3	10	0	0	1	751	1118	67.17%	12									
Peninsula	14	1	9	0	0	4	323	1213	26.63%	4									

Women's Competition

Team	Played	Wins	Losses	Draws	Byes	Forfeits	For	Against	Percentage	Pts
Towns	14	11	1	0	2	0	775	79	981.01%	44
Cable Beach	14	11	1	0	2	0	567	112	506.25%	44
Bulls	14	7	5	0	2	0	417	302	138.08%	28
Peninsula	13	5	5	0	2	0	295	390	75.64%	24
Saints	14	2	9	1	2	0	176	506	34.78%	10
Derby	13	2	7	0	2	2	163	587	27.77%	8
Bidyadanga	14	1	8	1	2	2	150	567	26.46%	6

=== 2023 Season ===
Men's Competition

Premiers: TBC

Bullen Medal (Best & Fairest): TBC

West Kimberley	Wins	Byes	Losses	Draws	For	Against	%	Pts	Final	Team	G	B	Pts	Team	G	B	Pts
Towns	13	0	1	0	1127	426	264.55%	52	1st Semi	Derby	14	14	98	Looma	9	6	60
Cable Beach	12	0	2	0	1220	643	189.74%	48	2nd Semi	Towns	7	7	49	Cable Beach	6	7	43
Looma	10	0	4	0	1074	774	138.76%	40	Preliminary	Cable Beach	10	11	71	Looma	8	7	55
Derby	6	0	7	1	778	784	99.23%	26	Grand	Cable Beach	11	7	73	Towns	10	4	64
Broome Bulls	6	0	8	0	796	828	96.14%	24									
Saints	4	0	10	0	693	1028	67.41%	16									
Peninsula Bombers	3	0	10	1	400	1051	38.06%	14									
Bidyadanga Emus	1	0	13	0	623	1177	52.93%	4									

Women's Competition

West Kimberley	Wins	Byes	Losses	Draws	For	Against	%	Pts	Final	Team	G	B	Pts	Team	G	B	Pts
Towns	10	0	1	0	654	125	523.20%	40	1st Semi	Looma	6	9	45	Saints	1	1	7
Cable Beach	10	0	1	0	640	135	474.07%	40	2nd Semi	Cable Beach	1	8	14	Towns	1	5	11
Looma	7	0	4	0	512	246	208.13%	28	Preliminary	Looma	5	6	36	Towns	2	8	20
Saints	3	0	7	0	176	431	40.84%	12	Grand	Cable Beach	7	4	46	Looma	3	6	24
Derby	2	0	8	0	173	571	30.30%	8									
Broome Bulls	1	0	10	0	123	771	15.95%	4									

== Bullen Medal Winners ==
Year	Winner(s)	Club(s)
1949	Tom Brown	Commonwealth
1953	Sid Tollentino	Towns
1954	Ernie Rahman	Towns
1955	Ernie Rahman	Towns
1972	Joe Roe	Saints
1973	John Cox	Saints
1974	Cliff Roonan	Warriors
1975	Phil Grantham	Towns
1976	Peter Marshall	Saints
1977	Greg Howard	Towns
1978	Alec Dann	Saints
1979	Peter Jackamarra	Beagle Bay
1980	Alec Dann	Beagle Bay
1981	Mark Norval	Derby
1982	Ron Foy	Meatworks
1983	Julius Barker	Towns
1984	Tommy Nicholls	One Arm Point
1985	Mark James	Towns
1986	Mark James	Towns
1987	Kevin Ejai	Bardi
1988	Terry Cox	Beagle Bay
1989	Wayne Edgar	Bidyadanga
1990	Glen Foulds	Beagle Bay
1991	Patrick Cox; Justin Sampi	Beagle Bay; Bardi
1992	Patrick Cox	Beagle Bay
1993	Chad McElroy	Towns
1994	Gavin Greaves	Cable Beach
1995	Revel Oakley; Stephen Cox	Saints; Beagle Bay
1996	Patrick Cox	Beagle Bay
1997	Chad McElroy	Bulls
1998	Clem Rodney	Bulls
1999	Brendon Cox	Peninsula Bombers
2000	Don Cruttenden	Cable Beach
2001	Gavin Mitchell	Saints
2002	Brendon Cox	Peninsula Bombers
2003	Davo Cox	Peninsula Bombers
2004	Joe Sara	Towns
2005	Bart Pigram	Saints
2006	Lyle Buck	Looma
2007	Joseph Dann	Cable Beach
2008	Lyle Buck	Looma
2009	Tim Richter	Towns
2010	Lyle Buck	Looma
2011	Geoff Clarke	Bombers
2012	Ben Saunders	Bulls
2013	Joseph Dann	Cable Beach
2014	Hayden McCleod	Bulls
2015	Gerrick Weedon	Derby Tigers
2016	Angelo Thomas; Hayden McCleod	Bidyadanga; Bulls
2017	Wade Wungundin	Derby Tigers
2018	Wade Wungundin; Anthony Treacy; Zephenier Skinner	Derby Tigers; Cable Beach; Looma
2019	Angelo Thomas	Bidyadanga
2020	(No award due to Covid)	
2021	Tristram Pigram	Saints
2022	Benjamin Goldie	Towns
2023	Daniel Moore	Bulls
2024	Kane Tribbick; Brennan Gillam	Saints; Looma
2025	CJ Oakley	Cable Beach
