= Preston Football Club =

Australian rules football club

Names
- Full name: Preston Football Club Inc.
- Former name(s): Preston Juniors Football Club (1920s); Preston Knights Football Club (1996−1999); Northern Blues Football Club (2012−2020) Northern Bullants Football Club (2000−2011; 2021−2025)
- Nickname(s): Bullants, Tonners, Ants
- Former nickname(s): Knights, Blues, Prestonians

Club details
- Founded: 1882; 144 years ago
- Colours: Red White
- Premierships: VFA/VFL (D1) (4): 1968; 1969; 1983; 1984; VFA (D2) (2): 1963; 1965; VJFA (5): 1900; 1901; 1902; 1921; 1923
- Ground: Preston City Oval (1887−2025)

Uniforms
Home	Clash	Original

Other information
- Official website: prestonfc.com.au

The Preston Football Club, nicknamed the Bullants, is an Australian rules football club based in the Melbourne suburb of Preston. The club last competed in the Victorian Football League (VFL) and played its home games at Preston City Oval.

The club was established in 1882. After playing in junior competitions, the club first participated in senior football in the Victorian Football Association (VFA) between 1903 and 1911, and then again continuously since 1926. The team became known as the Bullants, and wore a plain red guernsey with a white monogram. Preston won four VFA premierships, with its periods of greatest success coming in the 1960s and 1980s.

Since the VFA changed to become the VFL in the 1990s, Preston competed as the Preston Knights from 1996 until 1999 in a partnership with the Northern Knights under-18s team; and then as the Northern Bullants starting in 2000. The club had a reserves affiliation with the Carlton Football Club from the Australian Football League (AFL) from 2003 until 2019; and from 2012 until 2019, the club adopted Carlton's identity to become the Northern Blues, wearing navy blue and white.

The reserves alignment ended in 2020 during the COVID-19 pandemic, and the club operated as a stand-alone VFL club again as the Northern Bullants (2021–2025). Despite intending to return as the Preston Football Club the following year, the club had its VFL licence revoked at the end of the 2025 season, and was put into liquidation at the end of year.

== History ==
The club was formed in 1882, but little is known of its first three years before the Shire of Jika Jika changed its name in September 1885 to Preston. Preston and another local club, Gowerville, then merged and competed at lower levels of the Victorian Junior Football Association (VJFA). After a battle with the council, the club was finally granted permission in 1887 to play on Preston Park, where it has remained with the exception of one year when it played at Coburg to allow the ground to be widened.

=== 1890−1902: VJFA ===
From 1890, the club played in the first-rate division of the VJFA and, despite its remote location compared with other clubs, was the only one of the 28 teams of 1890 to survive the decade, despite finishing last or second last in five consecutive seasons.

By the late 1890s, the district was starting to grow, and the struggling club gathered depth and strength. It took out the first of three consecutive first-rate premierships in 1900, defeating Collingwood Juniors (effectively the League team's Seconds) before 5,000 people at Brunswick Street Oval. Further premierships followed in 1901 and 1902, with no finals being played as Preston finished the requisite two games clear of its nearest rivals to claim the title. After the 1902 premiership, "Bounce" in The Herald asked: "Will the VFL find room for [Preston]?"

=== 1903−1911: VFA entry ===
With the VFA keen to expand, Preston was a logical choice to join the senior body in 1903. The uniform changed from a blue jumper with yellow sash (which would have clashed with Williamstown) to a plain maroon jumper with navy blue knicks. Despite a reasonable opening season in which it won six games, the club struggled to find players and finished last in 1904 in the middle of what was to be a 27-game losing streak.

Several other bottom-of-the list results came before a brief resurgence in 1909 under former Collingwood champion Charlie Pannam, but with the loss of several key players to VFL clubs, Preston again went on a downward spiral and won just one game through 1910 and 1911.

=== 1912−1925: Back to the juniors ===
With Northcote joining the Association in 1908, pressure was applied for the two neighbouring clubs to merge and the VFA forced the issue early in 1912. Preston officials encouraged their players to move, but diverted all the club's trophies and assets to the junior Preston Districts Football Club, which had acted as its reserves team. Northcote became known as the Northcote and Preston Football Club (or simply Northcote-Preston) for the next few years, but it played its games in Northcote, retained Northcote's colours, and its team in the VFA continued to be known as Northcote. The merged entity is considered a continuation of the Northcote Football Club.

Preston was simply promoted before its time: by 1912, the district numbered just 4,800 people spread over 8,800 acres (an average of 0.6 persons per acre). Of the other suburbs represented in the VFA, the next smallest was Brighton with 11,000. Preston's leading player during the early VFA days was Sid Hall, a centre half-back regarded as the best high mark in the competition. Despite the lack of success, Preston managed to supply some fine players to VFL ranks in Percy Ogden (Essendon), Hedley Tomkins and Bill Hendrie (Melbourne), Hugh James (Richmond), Joe Prince (St Kilda, South Melbourne and Carlton), George Doull (Geelong) and Eric Woods (University). Preston's place was taken by Melbourne City which didn't win a game in the two years before it folded.

The junior club played as Preston Districts from 1912 to 1915, until the name changed to Preston prior to the start of the 1916 season, something that Preston officials may have always intended in 1912. This effectively meant Preston Districts ceased to exist, replaced by Preston.

The nucleus of Preston returned to the first-rate division of the Victorian Junior Football Association. Ogden returned to captain-coach the club in 1916 and 1917 while Essendon was in recess for the First World War; and, by 1919, Preston had re-established itself as one of the top teams in junior football. Young George Gough was recruited by Fitzroy as a rover. Premierships came in 1921 and again in 1923 with Preston, under the coaching of William "Bull" Adams, who had been refused a clearance to Fitzroy by his West Australian club, overrunning Yarraville in the final term despite playing one man short.

=== 1926: Rejoining the VFA ===
With the loss of North Melbourne, Footscray and Hawthorn to the League in 1925, the Association accepted Preston (just proclaimed a city) and Camberwell into its ranks for the 1926 season.

The team used the uniform from its junior days, a broad red stripe down the chest and back with white sides and sleeves. This time the club was ready for senior ranks, raising some eyebrows when it won nine of the 18 games in its first season as well as supplying the Recorder Cup winner, William "Bluey" Summers. A finals appearance came the following year. Preston's first ever senior final finished in a draw with Brighton, which won the replay a fortnight later.

The club remained in the middle ranking of the Association up until the cessation of play during World War I, the highlight being a remarkable 1931 season under the legendary Roy Cazaly who sacked half the side mid-season and promoted youngsters. Needing to win 12 games straight to ensure a finals spot, Preston managed to sneak in with 11 wins and a draw, but was bundled out in the preliminary final due to several injuries (including Cazaly).

Despite its modest finals record (the semi-final win was the only finals match Preston won), the club provided the 1934 and 1936 Recorder Cup winners in Danny Warr and Bert Hyde respectively. Leading players up to World War 2 included Summers, Warr, "Bert" Smith, Francis "Dickie" Dowling and Bill "Socks" Maslen, the latter pair being the club's record-holders for number of senior games played. Although he was never a star with Preston, 17-year-old Bert Deacon played his first match in 1940, later becoming Carlton's first Brownlow Medallist in 1947. With the abolition of clearance agreements between the League and Association in 1938, Preston snared Footscray champion Alby Morrison as captain-coach for 1939–40 (although Morrison did obtain a clearance), and in 1941 a young Geelong ruckman, Jack Lynch, who was switched to full-forward early in the season and finished with 133 goals. Lynch is the only known Preston player to have been killed during the War.

The "Bullants" nickname was first mentioned in the Herald newspaper in 1938, with an article on Association clubs adopting new nicknames, noting that "Preston will be known as the 'Bullants', because they can sting". 1930s radio commentator Wallace "Jumbo" Sharland referred to the small Preston team in its bright uniforms as "like a swarm of busy bullants".

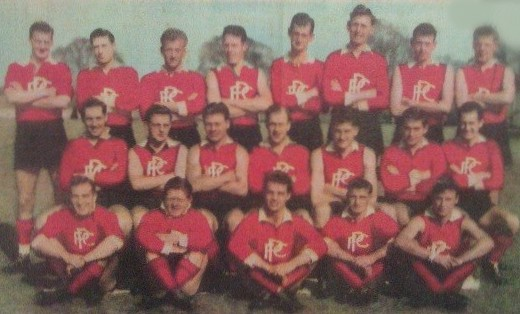
Preston players in 1954

Post-war, the uniform was changed to plain red with a "PFC" monogram, but finals appearances remained few and usually with little success. The club again was to the fore in the new Liston Trophy, providing the 1949 and 1953 winners in Jack Blackman and Ted Henrys. Henrys, a moderate utility player with Brunswick in previous years, switched to Preston at age 26 and moved to full-back in just his second match where he made the position his own, adding three consecutive club best-and-fairest awards to his Liston and becoming one of the first two Association players to be named in the All-Australian team.

Deacon returned as captain-coach in 1952 and other leading players through the 1950s including centre half-forward Pat Foley, Kevin Pritchard, rover George Bradford, back pocket Bob "Moggie" McLachlan, and the Chard brothers, Kevin and Fred, the latter leading the goal kicking on three occasions. Despite building a solid combination, the loss of several experienced players saw the club plummet to fifteenth in 1960 and forced into Second Division when the VFA opted for two levels. The club played second division finals in 1961 and 1962, but were beaten both times.

By 1963, Preston's all-time VFA finals record stood at just one win and one draw from 18 attempts, with 13 losses in succession. Again their premiership hopes looked doomed when the Bullants went down to Waverley in the second semi-final, but fate finally smiled when Preston beat Prahran comfortably in the Preliminary Final and then downed Waverley to take out a long-awaited premiership, and earn promotion to Division 1.

Preston was relegated back to Division 2 at the end of 1964, and ironically it was 1963 runners-up Waverley – who had been promoted to Division 1 only to replace Moorabbin after it was disqualified from the Association for being complicit in St Kilda's takeover of Moorabbin Oval – who defeated Preston in the final round to ensure their relegation. The return to Division 2 lasted only one year, with a minor premiership and Grand Final victory against Mordialloc seeing them promoted again. With substantially more depth and keen recruiting, Preston finishing third in Division 1 in 1966.

Bert Hyde, Preston's 1936 Recorder Cup winner, had lived in the area since his playing days and was an active official at Hawthorn, which was then rapidly emerging from years in the wilderness to become the power side of the 1960s. It was probably Hyde's influence that saw two Hawthorn players that were to become the cornerstone of Preston's success move to Association ranks – John McArthur, captain-coach of the 1965 premiership side was transferred to Western Australia on business and replaced by Alan Joyce, later to coach two AFL premiership sides. Joyce (with McArthur returning as a player) led Preston to back-to-back premierships in 1968 and 1969. Preston players won four out of six Liston Trophies between 1968 and 1971, with the award collected in 1968 by Dick Telford, in 1969 and 1971 by Laurie Hill, and in 1973 by Ray Shaw, who was then the youngest winner of the award.

Preston was beaten by Dandenong in the 1971 VFA Grand Final, which remains one of the most controversial in football history. Field umpire Jim McMaster awarded Dandenong full-forward Jim 'Frosty' Miller a free kick before the opening bounce, resulting in a goal; Dandenong ultimately won by six points. Preston protested, and despite several opinions from leading lawmakers that McMaster had no right to award the free kick because he had not officially started the game, Preston's protest proved to be of no avail.

Preston's fortunes slumped in the early 1970s, and the club narrowly avoided relegation at Coburg's expense in 1973, after defeating the Lions 171–154 in a famous high-scoring final round match. It wasn't until 1976 that Preston again played a major role in the finals, finishing second on the ladder, then crashing out after losses in the second semi and preliminary finals.

The club enjoyed a resurgence under Harold Martin in 1978, reaching the Grand Final where a crowd of nearly 30,000 packed the Junction Oval for what is still rated by many as one of the greatest-ever Grand Finals. After a tense opening, the crowd erupted late in the second term when Martin and another of football's legendary hard men, Sam Kekovich, went head-to-head in a wild brawl. Unfortunately for the Bullants, Prahran settled down much better in the second half and ran out comfortable winners.

=== 1980s ===
The club was one of the VFA's strongest in the 1980s, and it reached four Grand Finals in a row between 1981 and 1984. The team fell well short in the 1981 decider, unable to match Port Melbourne who inflicted a record Grand Final defeat (both score and winning margin) on the Bullants. The Borough kicked 23 goals to six in the second half to record its first score above 200 ever against the Bullants. The following season saw the return of Ray Shaw, captain of Collingwood in 1982 but disillusioned with bitter infighting at the club. Shaw's influence and a number of highly rated recruits had many believing that this would be Preston's year, but again Port Melbourne proved the nemesis with a seven-point win in the Grand Final.

Further strong recruiting brought together probably the greatest depth of players ever at an Association club. Preston rewrote the record books in 1983 by becoming the first club to win the Senior, Seconds and Thirds premierships in the same year in Division 1, and repeated the achievement in 1984. Preston was a dominant force in the Seconds over that period, reaching eight of ten Grand Finals between 1978 and 1987, winning five. The club had been a perennial force in the Thirds competition since the 1950s, missing the Grand Final only nine times over a 37-season stretch between 1953 and 1989 and winning the premiership a VFA-record 13 times (eleven in Division 1 and two in Division 2); its 1980s form was particularly strong, missing only one Grand Final between 1978 and 1989. Neil Jordon capitalised on the club's strong minor grade form, playing an astonishing 84 matches with the club across all three grades before ever playing in a losing side.

Eight straight wins in 1985 extended Preston's winning stretch to a record 23, but with the loss of Shaw to the Diamond Valley, retirement of a few experienced players and the movement of several promising younger players to League ranks, Preston's period of dominance was at an end. The club reached a further four finals series between 1985 and 1990, winning the minor premiership in 1990, but was eliminated from the finals by Williamstown on all four occasions. During this time, the club unearthed a new legend in Jamie "Spider" Shaw who kicked 106 in his first season and followed up with an astonishing 145 in 1986 before an unsuccessful stint at Fitzroy.

=== 1990s: Decline ===
With the ethnic mix of the Preston area rapidly changing and the almost saturation coverage of the now Australian Football League, the club's off-field position deteriorated in the 1990s, and it was constantly battling for survival. Preston was not the only club struggling, and at the end of 1994, the VFA Board of Management merged with the Victorian State Football League (VSFL) (now controlling the elite under-18 competition that had effectively replaced both the League and Association Thirds), and plans gradually evolved for the development of a new competition, which became the Victorian Football League.

With a mounting debt, Preston entered into a merger with the Northern Knights under-18 team in 1996. The combined entity was known as the Preston Knights and adopted the Knights uniform of white with black and blue hoops. The move provided some financial stability off the field, but little success on the football front.

In October 1997, the VSFL executive announced that the Preston Knights' licence with the League had been withdrawn and that Preston, after 95 years, was effectively out of the competition. A number of protest meetings were organised and the club found a willing ally in Don Gillies, an administrator appointed by the State Government to replace the long-dysfunctional Preston Council, who through years of neglect had allowed the Preston Oval to degenerate to a standard well below that required for senior football. Gillies, in meeting with the VSFL, undertook to initiate significant drainage and lighting improvements at the ground and after around about a month of uncertainty, the Knights' license was reinstated when Traralgon announced its withdrawal from the VFL after an unsuccessful two-year trial.

==== Bullants revival ====
The shaky alliance with the Knights continued until 1999 when the Board announced it could not recommend continuing. A new group approached the now VFL with a proposal to resurrect the club under the name of the Northern Bullants, market research having revealed that much of the club's support and player base no longer lay within the old Preston area. The revived club returned to a variation of the traditional red uniform, replacing the PFC monogram with a white bullant (although the logo actually featured a termite until it was replaced in 2002). The PFC initials were later added to the back of the guernsey below the collar.

At the same time, the AFL abandoned its reserves competition in favour of a restructured VFL comprising a number of AFL–VFL affiliations, AFL reserve teams and "standalone" VFL clubs. The Bullants opted not to pursue affiliation with an AFL club. 2000 and 2001 saw the stand-alone Bullants post six wins in each season, but the difficulty of having part-time players and coaching staff competing with full-time AFL counterparts was obvious in many games where the Bullants were highly competitive for much of the match but outgunned by fitter, bigger and stronger opposition late in the game.

=== 2003−2020: Affiliation ===
Just before the end of the 2002 season, proposals for affiliation were received from both Essendon and Carlton. Essendon's plans were virtual domination of the club with a jumper change, renaming as the Northern Bombers and playing several games each season at Windy Hill. Carlton's, on the other hand, was for a cooperative playing group with no change to traditional values and was accepted without major modification by the Bullants board.

The affiliated team continued under long-serving coach Mark P. Williams, but there was to be no instant success, the club coincidentally matching the 2001–02 result with six wins in 2003. With a few personal tensions emerging, Carlton announced its intention to withdraw from the two-year agreement at the end of the 2003 season, but subsequent negotiations between the two clubs and the VFL saw the problems resolved and a new arrangement established. Williams had already resigned, citing lack of time, (later accepting the role at Sandringham) and under the terms of the agreement, Carlton retained the right to nominate one of their assistant coaches, eventually Barry Mitchell, as his replacement.

Carlton at the time was struggling in the AFL due to the loss of National Draft picks because of salary cap infringements. This worked in the Bullants' favour in the mid-2000s, as Carlton opted to recruit a number of experienced mid-range AFL players recycled from other teams, who went on to provide a backbone of a very strong VFL team. The club surprised most by finishing third in 2005, then won the minor premiership with a club best 17–1 record in 2006, but suffered heavy losses in two finals to finish third.

Under coach David Teague, the Bullants managed to finish third on the ladder in 2009, then win through to the Grand Final for the first time since the 1984 victory; but, the team was comfortably beaten by North Ballarat. The Bullants reached a second consecutive Grand Final the following season, winning through to the Grand Final from sixth on the ladder, but again lost to North Ballarat. The club reached another preliminary final from sixth place in 2011.

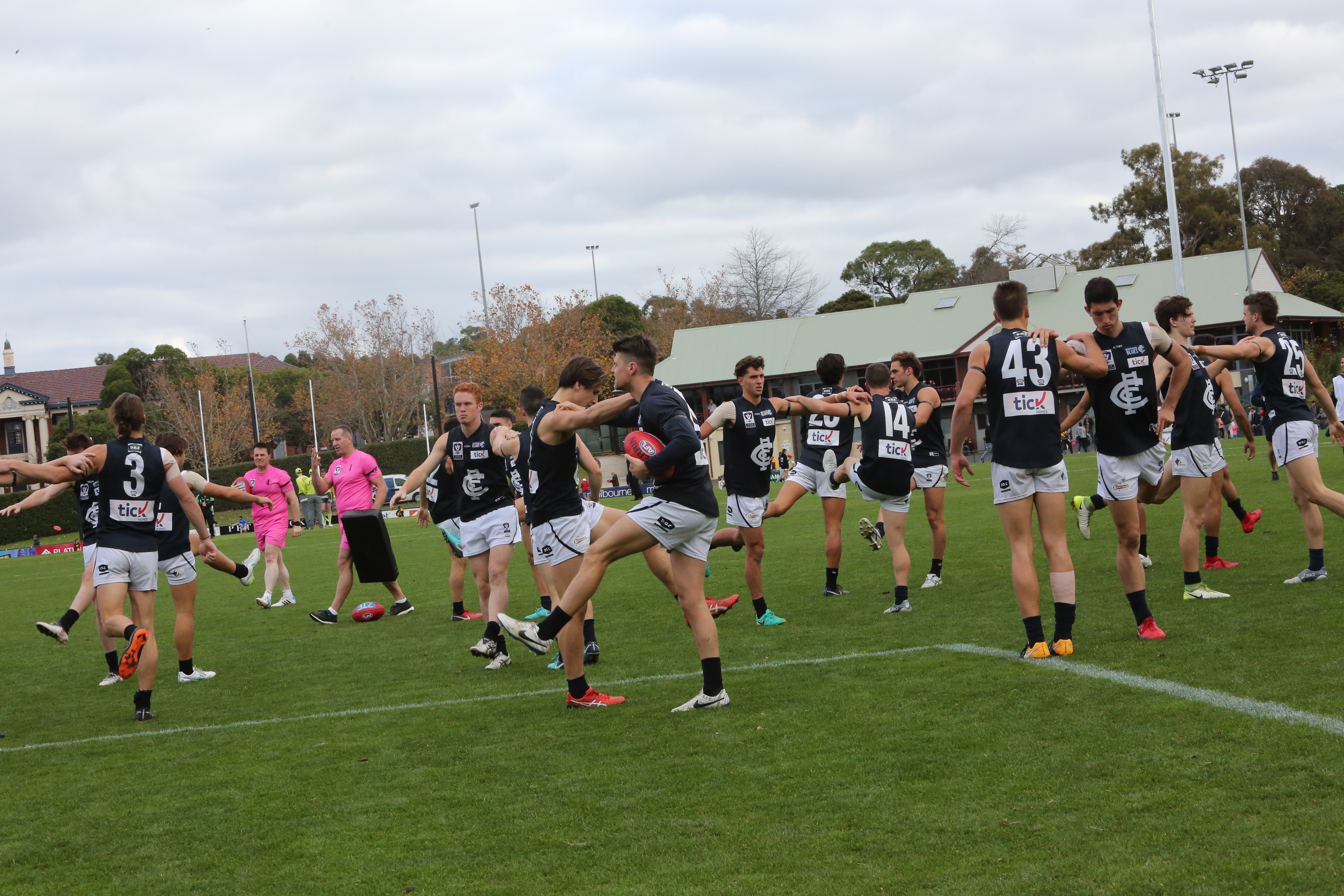
Northern Blues players in May 2018

In 2012, the club adopted many features of Carlton's identity. The club was renamed the Northern Blues, and the playing colours were changed to navy blue and white, featuring Carlton's CFC monogram but in a slightly different design to the AFL club's guernsey. Home games were split between Preston City Oval and Princes Park. The club retained a red and white guernsey for matches played in Preston, and when a clash guernsey was required. The club never made VFL finals under the Northern Blues name. Also during this time, the club's former identity was established in the form of the Northern Bullants Amateur Football Club, a separate entity that was established and entered the Victorian Amateur Football Association (VAFA). Preston AFC was formerly known as the Northern Bullants and later the Northern Blues, and by their current name since 2016.

In 2016, the Northern Blues had a partnership with the Diamond Creek Women's Football Club for the inaugural VFL Women's (VFLW) season.

By the end of their affiliation, the Northern Blues' existence as a club was thought to be reliant on the Carlton Football Club's financial backing. When the start of the 2020 AFL and VFL seasons, along with all other football, were suspended due to the COVID-19 pandemic, Carlton was forced to cut its expenses, and this included withdrawing its financial support for Northern, and ending its reserves affiliation. The Northern Blues initially announced they would be wound up and dissolved, and they were not included in revised plans for the 2020 VFL season (which was ultimately cancelled). However, the club regrouped during the pandemic, and found a way to remain viable as a stand-alone senior club, earning a licence to return in that capacity for the 2021 season. The club returned to trading under the Northern Bullants name, and wearing its traditional red and white guernsey.

=== 2021−2025: Standalone club folds ===
The Northern Bullants logo used from August 2020 until August 2025

In the five years after returning as a standalone club, the Bullants struggled in the VFL. The club won three wooden spoons: in 2022 (when it managed only a single win), 2024 and 2025. The club suffered several of the heaviest losses in its history over those five years, including against Werribee in round 22, 2022, in which it scored only scored 0.10 (10) and lost by 181 points; and against Footscray in round 18, 2023, in which it lost by 157 points and was held to its lowest-ever score of 0.4 (4), also the lowest score in the VFL for more than a century.

Former Collingwood player Brodie Holland coached the club in 2023, and former Carlton and Dandenong player Rohan Welsh coached the club in 2024. In a tumultuous start to the 2025 season, Welsh and the club courted controversy after expressing interest in signing former North Melbourne player Tarryn Thomas, who had been suspended from the AFL in 2024 following a number of legal issues, backing down after social media criticism and the threat of losing sponsors and members.

A new president and board took over the club in early 2025. They reverted the club from the Northern Bullants name to its traditional "Preston Football Club" name on 20 August 2025, immediately after the conclusion of the home-and-away season. The new board intended to continue in the VFL under the Preston name from 2026; but in October 2025, after years of uncompetitive performances, having struggled to pay its players and staff in 2025, and with questions over its long-term viability without the annual subsidies that clubs had received from the league prior to the pandemic-interrupted 2020 season, the VFL revoked the club's licence. Two months later, faced with no viable path to readmission, the club entered voluntary liquidation.

== Honours ==
=== Premierships ===
League	Division	Level	Wins	Years won
Victorian Football League	Division 1	Seniors	4	1968, 1969, 1983, 1984
Victorian Football League	Division 1	Reserves	6	1957, 1978, 1983, 1984, 1985, 1987
Victorian Football League	Division 1	Under-19s	11	1954, 1959, 1960, 1964, 1974, 1976, 1981, 1982, 1983, 1984, 1989
Victorian Football League	Division 2	Seniors	2	1963, 1965
Victorian Football League	Division 2	Reserves	2	1961, 1962
Victorian Football League	Division 2	Under-19s	2	1961, 1962
Victorian Junior Football Association			5	1900, 1901, 1902, 1921, 1923

=== Other Division 1 Awards ===
- Runners-Up (6): 1971, 1978, 1981, 1982, 2009, 2010
- Minor Premierships (8): 1968, 1969, 1971, 1982, 1983, 1984, 1990, 2006
- Wooden Spoons (9): 1904, 1905, 1907, 1910, 1911, 1964, 2022, 2024, 2025

== Records ==
=== Team records ===
Record	Total	League	Game
Highest score	49.21 (315) (Note: Sunshine withdrew from the VFA after round 9 of the 1989 season, and the eight matches it had played that season – including its 49.21 (315) to 9.5 (59) loss to Preston in round 5 – were subsequently expunged from the records.)	VFA	vs Sunshine, Round 5, 1989 at Skinner Reserve
Highest score	43.12 (270)	VFA	vs Camberwell, Round 8, 1989 at Preston City Oval
Highest score	32.16 (208)	VJFA	vs Ascot Vale, 1917
Lowest score	0.4 (4)	VFA	vs Brunswick, Round 14, 1905 at Park Street Oval
Lowest score	0.4 (4)	VFL	vs Footscray reserves, Round 18, 2023 at Preston City Oval
Highest score conceded	32.19 (211)	VFA	vs Port Melbourne, 1981 grand final at Junction Oval
Lowest score conceded	1.2 (8)	VFA	vs Brighton, Round 15, 1961 at Preston City Oval
Biggest wins	256 points	VFA	vs Sunshine, Round 5, 1989 at Skinner Reserve
Biggest wins	204 points	VFA	vs Camberwell, Round 13, 1986 at Camberwell Sports Ground
Biggest wins	185 points	VJFA	vs Ascot Vale, 1917
Biggest wins	185 points	VJFA	vs Kew, 1925
Biggest loss	181 points	VFL	vs Werribee, Round 22, 2022 at Chirnside Park
Highest finals attendance	29,565	VFA	vs Prahran, 1978 grand final at Junction Oval

=== Record by opponent ===
Updated to the end of round 3, 2025.

Club	Played	Won	Lost	Drew	Win %	Highest	Lowest
Bendigo	24	19	5	0	79.2	30.19 (199) – 2002	9.12 (66) – 2008
Box Hill						32.15 (207) – 2006	3.5 (23) – 1995
Brighton	63	34	28	1	53.9	22.14 (146) – 1941	0.5 (5) – 1908
Brighton-Caulfield	4	3	1	0	75.0	28.28 (196) – 1962	14.14 (98) – 1963
Brisbane reserves	2	0	2	0	0.0	4.7 (31) – 2022	2.5 (17) – 2023
Brunswick	106	50	55	1	47.2	26.16 (172) – 1979	0.4 (4) – 1905
Camberwell	73	49	23	1	67.1	43.12 (270) – 1989	4.10 (34) – 1928
Casey						31.13 (199) – 1986	2.6 (18) – 2016
Caulfield	18	13	5	0	72.2	30.23 (203) – 1981	12.11 (83) – 1980
Coburg						25.22 (172) – 1985	4.5 (29) – 2004
Collingwood reserves	23	12	11	0	52.1	19.15 (129) – 2011	5.7 (37) – 2019
Dandenong	61	32	28	1	52.5	32.24 (216) – 1984	4.11 (35) – 1968
Essendon (Association)	18	5	13	0	27.8	9.12 (66) – 1906	2.1 (13) – 1910
Essendon reserves	14	1	13	0	7.1	14.11 (95) – 2000	4.6 (30) – 2017
Essendon reserves	14	1	13	0	7.1	14.11 (95) – 2002	4.6 (30) – 2017
Footscray	18	1	17	0	5.6	8.8 (56) – 1905	0.8 (8) – 1905
Footscray reserves						16.16 (112) – 2014	0.4 (4) – 2023
Frankston						29.9 (183) – 2015	4.10 (34) – 2024
Geelong (Association)	4	4	0	0	100.0	20.10 (130) – 1927	10.17 (77) – 1926
Geelong reserves	32					22.17 (149) – 2004	2.9 (21) – 2012
Geelong West	40	28	12	0	70.0	24.20 (164) – 1981	7.12 (54) – 1975
Gold Coast	1	1	0	0	100.0	26.10 (166) – 2010	26.10 (166) – 2010
Gold Coast reserves	3	0	3	0	0.0	11.10 (76) – 2022	3.6 (24) – 2023
Greater Western Sydney reserves	2	0	2	0	0.0	8.7 (55) – 2023	5.8 (38) – 2022
Moorabbin (I)	14	8	6	0	57.1	21.11 (137) – 1951	3.5 (23) – 1953
Mordialloc	9	5	4	0	55.6	22.19 (151) – 1978	8.19 (67) – 1963
North Ballarat	37					23.16 (154) – 2007	3.5 (23) – 2004
North Melbourne	18	2	16	0	11.1	13.24 (102) – 1908	1.1 (7) – 1910
Northcote	73	36	36	1	49.3	26.17 (173) – 1957	3.6 (24) – 1948
Oakleigh	75	48	25	1	65.8	32.20 (212) – 1992	5.7 (37) – 1931
Port Melbourne	186					26.22 (178) – 1990	2.6 (18) – 1905
Prahran	139	77	60	2	55.4	32.15 (207) – 1980	0.5 (5) – 1904
Richmond	10	0	10	0	0.0	6.8 (44) – 1906	2.1 (13) – 1904
Richmond reserves	11	2	9	0	18.2	12.15 (87) – 2014	4.7 (31) – 2017
Sandringham	142					35.19 (229) – 1984	2.6 (18) – 2010
Southport	3	0	3	0	0.0	10.9 (69) – 2024	7.4 (46) – 2023
St Kilda reserves	1	0	1	0	0.0	10.10 (70) – 2000	10.10 (70) – 2000
Sunshine	18	12	6	0	66.7	26.9 (165) – 1972	6.4 (40) – 1960
Sydney reserves	3	2	1	0	66.6	15.14 (104) – 2022	9.4 (58) – 2024
Tasmania	10	7	3	0	70.0	24.15 (159) – 2002	11.6 (72) – 2004
Traralgon	4	4	0	0	100.0	27.14 (176) – 1996	9.9 (63) – 1997
Waverley	26	18	7	1	69.2	34.23 (227) – 1982	6.6 (42) – 1970
Werribee	166					29.19 (193) – 1984	0.10 (10) – 2022
West Melbourne	10	0	10	0	0.0	6.13 (49) – 1906	1.3 (9) – 1904
Williamstown						29.27 (201) – 1941	1.1 (7) – 1905
Williamstown						29.27 (201) – 1941	1.1 (7) – 1910
Yarraville	63	36	26	1	58.1	29.27 (201) – 1941	4.4 (28) – 1960

== Seasons ==
Premiers	Grand Finalist	Minor premiers	Finals appearance	Wooden spoon	VFA/VFL leading goalkicker	VFA/VFL best and fairest

=== Seniors ===
The 1912 to 1915 seasons overlap with the season records for the Preston Districts Football Club.

Year	League	Finish	W	L	D	Coach	Captain	Best and fairest	Leading goalkicker		Ref
1890	VJFA	7th	11	4	3						
1891	VJFA	14th	6	7	1						
1892	VJFA										
1893	VJFA						Robert Paterson		Robert Smart	7	
1894	VJFA						Robert Paterson				
1895	VJFA	12th	1	18	3		Robert Paterson		J. Henry	11	
1896	VJFA										
1897	VJFA	10th	2	16	0						
1898	VJFA	7th	7	11	0		Archie "Joe" White				
1899	VJFA						Archie "Joe" White				
1900	VJFA	1st	16	2	1		Andy Allen		E. Burnell	14	
1901	VJFA	1st	20	2	0		Andy Allen		Jackso	17	
1902	VJFA	1st	15	3	0		Andy Allen		I. "Tiny" Gilbert		
1903	VFA	7th	6	12	0		W. Gates		Dick Knell	14	
1904	VFA	10th	0	18	0		William Dickens		Bob Wawn or Prideaux (Note: "The Bullants: a History of Preston Football Club" claims Bob Wawn led the 1904 goalkicking with 12 goals. Searches of records for 15 games show Wawn with 8 and Prideaux with 9. Given Preston kicked only five goals in the missing games (rounds 8, 16, 18), Wawn would almost certainly have not kicked 12, but may have led the list.)		
1905	VFA	10th	1	17	0		Claude Stanlake		R.D. Landells	19	
1906	VFA	9th	5	13	0		Tod Collins; Parry Hall		R.D. Landells	27	
1907	VFA	10th	1	17	0	Percy Ogden	Arthur Hollis; Percy Ogden		Bill Punch	29	
1908	VFA	8th	4	13	1	Percy Ogden	Fred Howard; Percy Ogden		Bill Punch	27	
1909	VFA	8th	5	13	0	Charlie Pannam	Charlie Pannam		Bill Punch	22	
1910	VFA	10th	0	18	0		Bill Punch		Louie "Lon" Smith	20	
1911	VFA	10th	1	17	0	George Sparrow; Billy McGee	George Sparrow; Billy McGee				
1912	VJFA						George La Franchi				
1913	VJFA	5th	8	9	0		George La Franchi				
1914	VJFA	6th	4	10	1		George La Franchi				
1915	VJFA	7th	6	12	0		Bill Punch				
1916	VJFA	1st	14	2	0	Percy Ogden	Percy Ogden	Les Punch	T. A. Jacobs	68	
1917	VJFA	2nd	14	3	1	Percy Ogden	Percy Ogden	H. Brendell	Bill Eade	69	
1918	VJFA	5th	7	9	0	George Walker	George Walker	H. Brendell	T. A. Jacobs	26	
1919	VJFA					Sid Hall; William Billett	H. Brendell	Harry Bell	J. Piper	44	
1920	VJFA							William Thorpe; Tommy Downs	William Hills	35	
1921	VJFA	1st	15	3	0	"Toodly" McDonald	"Toodly" McDonald		Vic. Davis	79	
1922	VJFA	3rd	14	4	0		Les Punch	Archie Dickens	Vic. Davis	56	
1923	VJFA	2nd	17	2	0	Bill Adams	William "Bull" Adams	Les Punch	W. Routley	50	
1924	VJFA (D1)	2nd	14	2	0	Percy Ogden	Percy Ogden	Danny Warr	Vic. Davis	98	
1925	VJFA					Percy Ogden	Percy Ogden	George Surtees	Hugh Moffatt	59	
1926	VFA	6th	9	9	0	Gus Dobrigh	Gus Dobrigh	Walter "Bolla" White	Dave Hume	30	
1927	VFA	4th	12	6	0	Gus Dobrigh	Gus Dobrigh	Walter "Bolla" White	Dave Hume	61	
1928	VFA	4th	11	7	0	Bill Adams	Bill Adams	Hec Bridgeford	Rupert Dodd	40	
1929	VFA	3rd	16	6	0	Jimmy Goonan	Jimmy Goonan	William "Bull" Adams	William Adams	69	
1930	VFA	6th	10	9	1	Jimmy Goonan	Jimmy Goonan	Gilbert "Bert" Taylor	Jack McCormack	52	
1931	VFA	3rd	12	5	1	Roy Cazaly	Roy Cazaly	Jack Monoghan	Harry Davie	40	
1932	VFA	4th	14	6	0	Harry Hunter	Harry Hunter	George Smith	Danny Warr	54	
1933	VFA	6th	12	9	1	Charlie McSwain	Charlie McSwain	Robert Cameron	Danny Warr	37	
1934	VFA	2nd	14	4	0	Charlie McSwain	Charlie McSwain	Danny Warr	Danny Warr	57	
1935	VFA	6th	10	7	1	Danny Warr	Danny Warr	Aub Robinson	Danny Warr	42	
1936	VFA	6th	10	8	0	Bert Hyde	Bert Hyde	Noel Fisher	Noel Fisher	62	
1937	VFA	11th	4	12	0	Bert Hyde	Bert Hyde	Wyn Murray	Ed Latham	28	
1938	VFA	6th	8	8	0	Wyn Murray; Bob Muir	Wyn Murray	Jack Clarke	Alf Roach	52	
1939	VFA	8th	9	11	0	Alby Morrison	Alby Morrison	Frank "Dickie" Dowling	Albie Morrison	33	
1940	VFA	4th	14	6	0	Alby Morrison	Alby Morrison	Bill Maslen	Albie Morrison	72	
1941	VFA	4th	14	6	0	Frank Dowling	Frank Dowling	Jack Connelly; Jack Norman	Jack Lynch	133	
1942	VFA	(No season due to World War II)									
1943	VFA	(No season due to World War II)									
1944	VFA	(No season due to World War II)									
1945	VFA	5th	11	9	0	Frank Anderson	Frank Anderson	Bill Maslen	Jack Connelly	72	
1946	VFA	11th	5	15	0	Frank Anderson	Frank Anderson	Syd Stewart	Jack Connelly	26	
1947	VFA	10th	7	14	1	Jack Blackman	Jack Blackman	Ron Leishman	Ray Potter	46	
1948	VFA	6th	12	8	0	Jack Blackman	Jack Blackman	Jack Blackman	Ray Potter	84	
1949	VFA	9th	8	13	0	Jack Blackman	Jack Blackman	Kollen Bryce	Bill Nathan	41	
1950	VFA	11th	3	16	0	Hugh Thomas	Charlie Stewart	Len Walker	George Bradford	38	
1951	VFA	10th	8	10	2	Reg Ryan; Ray Riddell	Reg Ryan; Dick Goldin	Ted Henrys	Bill Harvey	53	
1952	VFA	11th	7	12	1	Bert Deacon	Bert Deacon	Ted Henrys	George Bradford	38	
1953	VFA	9th	8	12	0	Bert Deacon	Bert Deacon	Ted Henrys	Pat Foley	35	
1954	VFA	5th	13	7	0	Bert Deacon	Ted Henrys	Pat Foley	Fred Chard	84	
1955	VFA	2nd	17	3	0	Bert Deacon	Fred Lalor	George Bradford	Fred Chard	75	
1956	VFA	5th	14	6	0	Bert Deacon	Fred Lalor	Les Sweet	Fred Chard	49	
1957	VFA	4th	13	7	0	Les Foote	Les Foote	Clem Cooper	Fred Chard	84	
1958	VFA	12th	6	11	1	Les Foote	Les Foote	Jim Cusack	Laurie Rymer	44	
1959	VFA	11th	8	12	0	Pat Foley	Claude Howard	Ron Dangaard	Gerry Walsh	45	
1960	VFA	14th	4	14	0	Pat Foley	Claude Howard	Bob McLachlan	Kevi Bergin	17	
1961	VFA (D2)	3rd	11	7	0	Bert Edmonds	Bob McLachlan	George Hancock	Ray Murnane	35	
1962	VFA (D2)	1st	14	2	0	Bert Edmonds	John O'Keefe	Graham Pinfold	Jim Lambie	38	
1963	VFA (D2)	2nd	12	4	0	Charlie Stewart	George Hancock	Bob Stewart	Bruce Waddell	38	
1964	VFA (D1)	10th	3	14	1	Charlie Stewart	Graham Pinfold	Bob Treloar	John Walker	50	
1965	VFA (D2)	1st	13	3	0	John McArthur	John McArthur	Ray Murnane	John Walker	116	
1966	VFA (D1)	4th	12	6	0	Alan Joyce	Alan Joyce	Bob Treloar	John Walker	84	
1967	VFA (D1)	4th	10	8	0	Alan Joyce	Alan Joyce	Denis Dalton	John Walker	83	
1968	VFA (D1)	1st	15	3	0	Alan Joyce	Alan Joyce	Dick Telford	Alan Joyce	41	
1969	VFA (D1)	1st	17	1	0	Alan Joyce	Alan Joyce	Dick Telford	Alan Joyce	69	
1970	VFA (D1)	6th	11	7	0	Alan Joyce	Alan Joyce	Laurie Hill	Alan Joyce	62	
1971	VFA (D1)	1st	13	4	1	Kevin Wright	Laurie Hill	Laurie Hill	Bob Baird	46	
1972	VFA (D1)	4th	11	7	0	Kevin Wright	Laurie Hill	Len Clark	Len Clark	107	
1973	VFA (D1)	9th	6	12	0	Ken Greenwood	Ken Greenwood	Ray Shaw	Len Clark	85	
1974	VFA (D1)	6th	9	9	0	Bob Syme	Harold Martin	Noel Zunneberg	Len Clark	40	
1975	VFA (D1)	5th	8	10	0	Dick Telford	Noel Zunneberg	Gary Grainger	Noel Zunneberg	37	
1976	VFA (D1)	2nd	13	5	0	Dick Telford	Gary Grainger	George Shickert	Craig Stewart	51	
1977	VFA (D1)	9th	5	13	0	Graeme Renwick	Graeme Renwick	Craig Stewart	Leigh Carlson	44	
1978	VFA (D1)	2nd	12	5	1	Harold Martin	Harold Martin	Harold Martin	Bruce Gonsalves	50	
1979	VFA (D1)	7th	8	10	0	Harold Martin	Harold Martin	Paul Bolger	Kalev Vann	50	
1980	VFA (D1)	7th	6	12	0	Harold Martin	Harold Martin	Brett Cooper	John Frazer	52	
1981	VFA (D1)	2nd	12	6	0	Harold Martin	Peter Marshall	Adrian Marcon	Shane Halas	69	
1982	VFA (D1)	1st	16	2	0	Ray Shaw	Ray Shaw	Geoff Austen	Shane Halas	76	
1983	VFA (D1)	1st	15	3	0	Ray Shaw	Ray Shaw	Geoff Austen	John Bourke	51	
1984	VFA (D1)	1st	16	2	0	Ray Shaw	Ray Shaw	David Brine	Shane Halas	58	
1985	VFA (D1)	3rd	14	4	0	Peter Weightman	David Brine	Gratz Salvador	Jamie Shaw	106	
1986	VFA (D1)	4th	12	6	0	Peter Weightman	David Brine	Jamie Shaw	Jamie Shaw	145	
1987	VFA (D1)	8th	8	9	1	Peter Weightman	David Brine	Glenn Reeves	Darren Murphy; Shane Halas	31	
1988	VFA (D1)	2nd	12	6	0	Peter Weightman	David Brine	Rod Dunbar	Jamie Shaw	105	
1989	VFA	7th	9	9	0	Len Thompson	Neil Jordan	Rod Dunbar	Jamie Shaw	60	
1990	VFA	1st	13	4	1	Neil Jordan	Neil Jordan	Joe Lumicisi	Jamie Shaw	103	
1991	VFA	11th	3	15	0	Neil Jordan	Neil Jordan	Joe Lumicisi	Max Graziano	37	
1992	VFA	9th	8	10	0	Neil Jordan	Neil Jordan	Matt Burrows	Jamie Shaw	73	
1993	VFA	10th	7	11	0	David Dickson	Glenn Reeves	Paul King	Jamie Shaw	81	
1994	VFA	9th	5	13	0	Peter Weightman	Glenn Reeves	Simon Taylor	Shane Dupuy	39	
1995	VFA	7th	5	11	0	Peter Weightman	Simon Taylor	Jamie Dobbs	Craig Shearer	37	
1996	VFL	9th	6	12	0	Peter Weightman	Simon Taylor	Matt Dobell	Tony Wilson	27	
1997	VFL	7th	7	11	0	Peter Weightman	Phillip Plunkett	Robert Maiorana	Paul Eccles	52	
1998	VFL	5th	10	8	0	Mark Williams	Phillip Plunkett	Kristian Pascoe	Dean Grainger	33	
1999	VFL	10th	1	15	2	Mark Williams	Phillip Plunkett	Kristian Pascoe	Shannon Gibson	29	
2000	VFL	16th	4	15	0	Mark Williams	Shannon Gibson	Brett Zorzi	Scott Grainger		
2001	VFL	14th	6	14	0	Mark Williams	Shannon Gibson	Brett Zorzi	Shane Watson	45	
2002	VFL	13th	6	14	0	Mark Williams	Shannon Gibson	Cameron Ramsay	Scott Grainger	34	
2003	VFL	11th	6	12	0	Mark Williams	Shannon Gibson	Shane Watson	Nick Sautner	82	
2004	VFL	12th	5	13	0	Barry Mitchell	Brett Zorzi	Brett Zorzi; Jarrod McCorkell	Ricky Mott	19	
2005	VFL	2nd	13	4	1	Barry Mitchell	Frankie Raso	Glen Bowyer			
2006	VFL	1st	17	1	0	Barry Mitchell	Frankie Raso	Daniel Harford			
2007	VFL	9th	8	10	0	Barry Mitchell	Frankie Raso	Adam Iacobucci			
2008	VFL	8th	8	8	0	David Teague	Josh Vansittart	Jason Saddington			
2009	VFL	3rd	12	6	0	David Teague	Adam Iacobucci	David Ellard			
2010	VFL	6th	10	8	0	David Teague	Adam Iacobucci	Jarrod McCorkell			
2011	VFL	6th	10	8	0	Darren Harris	Adam Iacobucci	Brock McLean			
2012	VFL	10th	6	12	0	Robert Hyde; Darren Harris	Brent Bransgrove; Andre Gianfagna	Adam Marcon			
2013	VFL	9th	8	10	0	Luke Webster	Brent Bransgrove; Andre Gianfagna	Kane Lambert			
2014	VFL	11th	7	11	0	Luke Webster	Brent Bransgrove	Tom Wilson			
2015	VFL	14th	4	14	0	Luke Webster	Brent Bransgrove	Brad Walsh			
2016	VFL	13th	6	12	0	Josh Fraser	Tom Wilson	Tom Wilson			
2017	VFL	9th	8	10	0	Josh Fraser	Tom Wilson	Cam O'Shea			
2018	VFL	12th	6	12	0	Josh Fraser	Tom Wilson	Tom Wilson			
2019	VFL	10th	7	11	0	Josh Fraser	Tom Wilson	Hugh Goddard			
2020	VFL	(No season)				Josh Fraser	Tom Wilson	(No season)			
2021	VFL	18th	3	7	0	Josh Fraser	Tom Wilson	Tom Wilson	Tynan Smith	13	
2022	VFL	21st	1	17	0	Ben Hart	Tom Wilson	Tom Wilson	Jack Boyd	24	
2023	VFL	20th	2	16	0	Brodie Holland	Matthew King; Liam Mackie	Jean-Luc Velissaris	Brandon Ryan	18	
2024	VFL	21st	2	16	0	Rohan Welsh	Matthew King; Liam Mackie	Jean-Luc Velissaris	John Jorgensen	25	
2025	VFL	21st	2	16	0	Rohan Welsh; Rocky Iannello (Note: Rocky Iannello was appointed as the acting head coach for round 1 of the 2025 season because Rohan Welsh had been hospitalised with a severe foot infection.)	Liam Mackie	Jean-Luc Velissaris	John Jorgensen	28	

=== Grand finals ===
Premiers	Runners-up	Drawn

Year	League	Grade	Opponent	Score	Venue	Attendance	Date	Report
1900	VJFA	Seniors	Collingwood Juniors	3.3 (21) d. 1.6 (12)			15 September 1900	
1901	VJFA	Seniors	(No grand final required as Preston was at least two games clear of the second-placed club)					
1902	VJFA	Seniors	(No grand final required as Preston was at least two games clear of the second-placed club)					
1916	VJFA	Seniors	Collingwood Juniors	2.9 (21) d. 2.6 (18)	East Melbourne Cricket Ground	5,000	14 October 1916	
1921	VJFA	Seniors	Port Melbourne Railway United	9.8 (62) d. 6.15 (51)	Dandenong		1 October 1921	
1923	VJFA	Seniors	Yarraville	9.15 (69) 7.10 (52)	Richmond Cricket Ground	5,000	27 September 1923	
1957	VFA	Reserves	Moorabbin	11.12 (78) d. 5.12 (42)	St Kilda Cricket Ground		5 October 1957	
1963	VFA D2	Seniors	Waverley	11.14 (80) d. 9.15 (69)	Toorak Park	15,000	15 September 1963	
1965	VFA D2	Seniors	Mordialloc	15.12 (102) d. 9.10 (64)	Toorak Park	10,000	12 September 1965	
1968	VFA D1	Seniors	Prahran	15.8 (98) d. 12.12 (84)	Punt Road Oval	18,000	22 September 1968	
1969	VFA D1	Seniors	Dandenong	12.11 (83) d. 10.11 (71)	Punt Road Oval	10,000	21 September 1969	
1971	VFA D1	Seniors	Dandenong	14.14 (98) d. 13.14 (92)	St Kilda Cricket Ground	14,529	26 September 1971	
1978	VFA D1	Reserves	Port Melbourne	10.13 (73) d. 10.12 (72)	Toorak Park		16 September 1978	
1978	VFA D1	Seniors	Prahran	21.15 (141) d. 17.17 (119)	St Kilda Cricket Ground	29,595	24 September 1978	
1981	VFA D1	Seniors	Port Melbourne	32.19 (211) d. 15.8 (98)	St Kilda Cricket Ground	20,180	20 September 1981	
1982	VFA D1	Seniors	Port Melbourne	21.15 (141) d. 20.14 (134)	St Kilda Cricket Ground	20,732	19 September 1982	
1983	VFA D1	Seniors	Geelong West	14.10 (94) d. 12.15 (87)	St Kilda Cricket Ground	14,719	18 September 1983	
1983	VFA D1	Reserves	Frankston	14.20 (104) drew 16.8 (104)	Toorak Park		18 September 1983	
1983	VFA D1	Reserves	Frankston	18.15 (123) d. 12.13 (85)	Frankston Park		25 September 1983	
1983	VFA D1	Thirds	unknown	unknown	unknown		September 1978	
1984	VFA D1	Seniors	Frankston	19.21 (135) d. 12.9 (81)	St Kilda Cricket Ground	8,664	23 September 1984	
1984	VFA D1	Thirds	Port Melbourne	unknown	unknown		September 1978	
2009	VFL	Seniors	North Ballarat	14.7 (91) d. 10.8 (68)	Etihad Stadium	14,026	25 September 2009	
2010	VFL	Seniors	North Ballarat	20.13 (133) d. 13.8 (86)	Etihad Stadium	11,000	19 September 2010	

== Club song ==
The club song is sung to the tune of "The Yankee Doodle Boy", which is also the basis for the Hawthorn/Box Hill and Sandringham club songs.

We're from Preston, we’re the Bullants
The good old red and white, are we
All good stickers for the red and white
Always we fight for victory, at Preston
We're the best in the competition,
We won't give up while there's a chance
We're a team of champions, full of fighting spirit
That's why they call us the Bullants
