= David Brine (footballer) =

Australian rules footballer

Personal information
- Born: 4 April 1960 (age 66)
- Original team: East Ringwood
- Height: 185 cm (6 ft 1 in)
- Weight: 77 kg (170 lb)

Playing career^{1}
Years	Club	Games (Goals)
1980	Collingwood	3 (0)
- ^{1} Playing statistics correct to the end of 1980.

David Brine (born 4 April 1960) is a former Australian rules footballer who played with Collingwood in the Victorian Football League (VFL).

Brine, an East Ringwood recruit, made three league appearances for Collingwood, as a 20-year-old in the 1980 VFL season. For the rest of the decade he played at Preston in the Victorian Football Association. He was a member of Preston's 1983 and 1984 premiership teams. In the 1983 Grand Final he filled in as captain, due to Ray Shaw being ruled out with an injury. He held the captaincy full-time from 1985 to 1988, under coach Peter Weightman; and he served as captain of the Association representative team from 1985.
