= Tom Wilson (Australian footballer) =

Australian rules footballer and coach (born 1992)

- Wilson pre-match with Melbourne in 2026

Personal information
- Full name: Thomas Wilson
- Born: 16 May 1992 (age 34)
- Original team: Eastern Ranges (TAC Cup)
- Height: 176 cm (5 ft 9 in)
- Weight: 76 kg (168 lb)

Playing career
Years	Club	Games (Goals)
2011–2022	Northern Blues/Bullants	140 (87)
2023–2025	Collingwood reserves	36 (21)
Total		176 (108)

Representative team honours
Years	Team	Games (Goals)
2017	VFL	1 (0)

Coaching career^{3}
Years	Club	Games (W–L–D)
2026–	Melbourne (W)	8 (7–1–0)
- ^{3} Coaching statistics correct as of round 8, 2026.

Career highlights
- Preston captain: 2016–2022; 2x VFL Team of the Year: 2016, 2021; 5× Laurie Hill Trophy: 2014, 2016, 2018, 2021, 2022; Northern Blues second best-and-fairest: 2017; Bullant Players' Player of the Year: 2016; Jamie Shaw Award: 2013

Thomas Wilson (born 16 May 1992) is an Australian rules football coach and former player. He is currently the head coach of the Melbourne Football Club in the AFL Women's (AFLW).

Wilson is a life member of the Victorian Football League (VFL), where he played 176 matches throughout a 15-year career at the Preston Football Club (known as the Northern Blues and Northern Bullants at the time) and Collingwood's reserves team. He served as Blues/Bullants captain for seven years, won the club's best-and-fairest award on five separate occasions (the most of any player in Preston's history) and was a two-time VFL Team of the Year member.

== Playing career ==
=== Northern Blues/Bullants (2011–2022) ===
Wilson made his Victorian Football League (VFL) debut for the Northern Bullants in round 13 of the 2011 season against North Ballarat. He remained at the club (which was renamed to the Northern Blues) in 2012.

In 2013, Wilson tied with Kane Lambert to win the Jamie Shaw Award as Northern's leading goalkicker, having kicked 20 goals during the season. He became a member of the club's leadership group in 2014, winning the Laurie Hill Trophy as the club's best and fairest player the same year. Wilson was awarded life membership of the club following the conclusion of the 2015 season.

At the start of 2016, Wilson was named Northern Blues captain, taking over from Brent Bransgrove. He had his best-performing month in July, when he was voted best-on-ground by the club's coaches in four consecutive matches. He won the Laurie Hill Trophy for a second time, in addition to being named the inaugural Bullant Players' Player of the Year by the club's past players. Wilson was also named on the interchange bench for the 2016 VFL Team of the Year.

In 2017, Wilson played for the VFL in an interstate representative match against the West Australian Football League (WAFL) at North Port Oval, which the WAFL won by 63 points. He finished second in Northern's 2017 best and fairest count with more than 100 votes, only behind Cam O'Shea. In 2018, he played his 100th VFL match and won the Laurie Hill Trophy for a third time, finishing the season with career-best tallies in disposals, clearances and inside-50s.

During Northern's match against North Melbourne in round 6 of the 2019 season, Wilson suffered an anterior cruciate ligament (ACL) injury that resulted in him missing the remainder of the season. He re-signed with the club on 2 October 2019; by this point, he was the last Northern-listed player who had represented the club when it was known as the Bullants.

Wilson tackles Box Hill's Will Langford while playing for the Northern Blues in 2018

The 2020 VFL season was cancelled because of the COVID-19 pandemic, which also resulted in the Carlton Football Club ending its reserves affiliation with the Northern Blues. While the Northern Blues initially announced that it would fold, the club regrouped throughout the year and remained in the VFL (under its previous name of the Northern Bullants). Wilson was the first player to sign with the Bullants for the 2021 season, remaining the club's captain. He played in all ten matches during the curtailed season and averaged 24.2 disposals, earning him a position on the interchange bench for the 2021 VFL Team of the Year and a record fourth Laurie Hill Trophy.

In 2022, Wilson continued his strong form to average 29.2 disposals and 9.6 contested possessions, resulting in him winning a fifth Laurie Hill Trophy and being named in the 40-man extended VFL Team of the Year squad.

=== Collingwood (2023–2025) ===
Following the conclusion of the 2022 season, Wilson left the Bullants to join Collingwood's reserves team. He was a member of the club's VFL leadership group from 2023 until the end of the 2025 season.

On 16 August 2025, Wilson played his 175th VFL senior match, earning him VFL life membership. He was the VFL's most capped active player at the time, following Ben Jolley's retirement at the end of 2023.

Wilson's final VFL match was a 12-point loss to Williamstown in the wildcard final, where he kicked one goal. This was just the second time he had played in a VFL finals match (the first being the 2011 elimination final against Bendigo). He announced his retirement on 8 October 2025.

== Coaching career ==
Wilson joined the coaching panel of Collingwood's AFL Women's (AFLW) team in 2024, serving as the midfield coach and head of development.

On 7 April 2026, Wilson was announced as the coach of the Melbourne Football Club in the AFLW, replacing Mick Stinear.

== Personal life ==
Wilson is married to Ruby, and the couple has twin daughters. His cousin is Tahlia Sanger, who plays for Collingwood's VFL Women's (VFLW) team. In addition to his playing and coaching career, Wilson has worked as a teacher.
