= 1953 VFA season =

1953 VFA premiership season
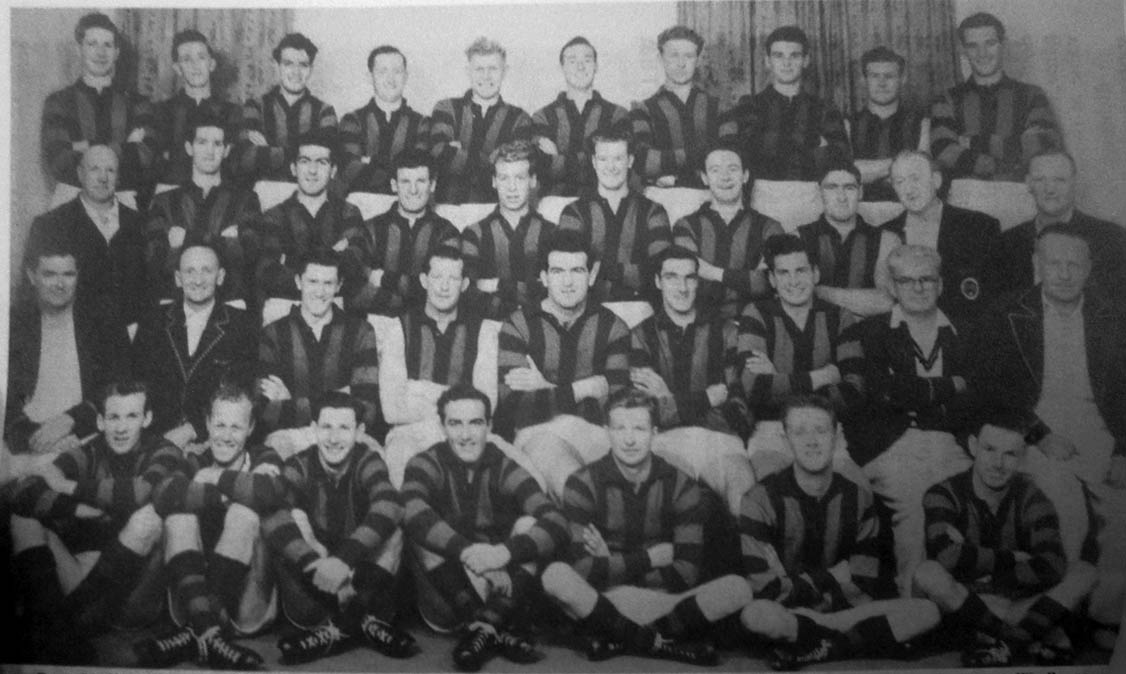
- Port Melbourne, premier team
- Teams: 14
- Premiers: Port Melbourne; 7th premiership
- Minor premiers: Port Melbourne; 5th minor premiership

The 1953 Victorian Football Association season was the 72nd season of the Australian rules football competition. The premiership was won by the Port Melbourne Football Club, after it defeated Yarraville by 60 points in the Grand Final on 3 October. It was Port Melbourne's seventh VFA premiership, and it was the only premiership that the club won during a sequence of eight consecutive Grand Finals played from 1950 until 1957, and five consecutive minor premierships won from 1951 until 1955.

== Premiership ==
The home-and-home season was played over twenty matches, before the top four clubs contested a finals series under the Page–McIntyre system to determine the premiers for the season.

=== Ladder ===
1953 VFA ladder
Pos	Team	Pld	W	L	D	PF	PA	PP	Pts
1	Port Melbourne (P)	20	18	2	0	2052	1047	196.0	72
2	Williamstown	20	16	3	1	1939	1278	151.7	66
3	Yarraville	20	13	5	2	1542	1361	113.3	56
4	Prahran	20	13	6	1	1745	1403	124.4	54
5	Oakleigh	20	13	6	1	1667	1354	123.1	54
6	Coburg	20	12	7	1	1682	1413	119.0	50
7	Brunswick	20	10	10	0	1383	1385	99.9	40
8	Moorabbin	20	9	10	1	1436	1477	97.2	38
9	Preston	20	8	12	0	1375	1484	92.7	32
10	Box Hill	20	7	13	0	1370	1704	80.4	28
11	Camberwell	20	5	14	1	1389	1730	80.3	22
12	Northcote	20	5	15	0	1312	1482	88.5	20
13	Sandringham	20	5	15	0	1237	2103	58.8	20
14	Brighton	20	2	18	0	1138	2046	55.6	8

Rules for classification: 1) points; 2) percentage; 3) number of points for.
(P) Premiers

=== Finals ===
	Semifinals
Saturday, 12 September	Yarraville 8.16 (64)	def.	Prahran 9.7 (61)	St Kilda Cricket Ground (crowd: 16,000)
Saturday, 19 September	Port Melbourne 12.14 (86)	def.	Williamstown 12.4 (76)	St Kilda Cricket Ground (crowd: 12,000)

	Preliminary Final
Saturday, 26 September	Williamstown 11.13 (79)	def. by	Yarraville 12.11 (83)	St Kilda Cricket Ground (crowd: 20,000)

1953 VFA Grand Final
Saturday, 3 October	Port Melbourne	def.	Yarraville	St Kilda Cricket Ground (crowd: 40,000)
2.4 (16); 7.9 (51); 12.10 (82); 21.15 (141)	Q1; Q2; Q3; Final	2.2 (14); 3.5 (23); 9.8 (62); 12.9 (81)
Fraser 7, Bonnett 6, Miller 2, Murray 2, Atkinson, Bragg, Laffey, Owens	Goals	Salt 3, Smallwood 3, Marchesi 2, H. Mason 2, N. Rohleder 2
Injuries	Cook (ankle), Gwynn (thigh), Jones (concussion), Smith (back)

== Awards ==
- The leading goalkicker for the home-and-home season was Johnny Walker (Williamstown), who kicked 98 goals.
- The J. J. Liston Trophy was won by Ted Henrys (Preston), who polled 37 votes. Vic Hill (Oakleigh) was second with 33 votes, and Harry Simpson (Williamstown) and Colin Boyd (Prahran) were equal-third with 31 votes.
- Yarraville won the seconds premiership. Yarraville 10.13 (73) defeated Moorabbin 8.11 (59) in the Grand Final, played as a curtain raiser to the firsts Grand Final on 3 October.

== Notable events ==
=== Adelaide Carnival ===
The Association competed in the 1953 Adelaide Carnival, and finished in fourth place with a record of 1–3. Two Association players were named in the inaugural All-Australian team, which was named based on performances at the carnival: Frank Johnson and Ted Henrys.

	1953 Adelaide Carnival
Wednesday, 8 July	Victoria (VFA) 11.18 (84)	def.	Tasmania 5.11 (41)	Adelaide Oval
Monday, 13 July	Victoria (VFL) 16.13 (109)	def.	Victoria (VFA) 11.10 (76)	Adelaide Oval
Wednesday, 15 July	South Australia 16.16 (112)	def.	Victoria (VFA) 7.11 (53)	Adelaide Oval
Saturday, 18 July	Western Australia 12.8 (80)	def.	Victoria (VFA) 8.14 (62)	Adelaide Oval

=== Other notable events ===
- Early in the VFA Sub-Districts season, the Port Melbourne Thirds team lost its first match since 1946, ending a 127-game winning streak. The team lost its first match in its inaugural season of 1946, before embarking on the record-breaking winning streak, which incorporated seven consecutive premierships.
- On 16 May, a premiership match between 1952 Grand Finalists Oakleigh and Port Melbourne was played at Bolton Park, Wagga Wagga, New South Wales. The match was arranged by the Australian National Football Council to help spread the game to the New South Wales riverina district. Port Melbourne 11.13 (79) defeated Oakleigh 8.13 (61) before a crowd of 4,000 people.
- On Tuesday 2 June (Coronation Day holiday), a representative match was played at the St Kilda Cricket Ground between teams representing the six North-of-the-Yarra clubs (Brunswick, Coburg, Northcote, Preston, Williamstown, Yarraville) and the eight South-of-the-Yarra clubs (Box Hill, Brighton, Camberwell, Moorabbin, Oakleigh, Port Melbourne, Prahran, Sandringham). North 11.20 (86) defeated South 10.9 (69), after overcoming an eighteen-point three-quarter time deficit. The North vs South game did not become a regular fixture in the VFA Senior competition, but later became the chief representative fixture in the VFL Thirds competition.
- In July, the Association was granted full voting rights within the Australian National Football Council for the first time. When the Association first affiliated with the ANFC in 1950, it had all rights of a full delegate except that it could not vote on motions.
- Several Association clubs encountered financial difficulties during the 1953 season. By July, Brighton, Camberwell and Northcote were all operating on an amateur basis, having lost the financial capacity to pay their players.
- In September, Ray Gibb (Box Hill) died in a motorcycle accident. A benefit game to raise money for his family was played on Show Day at Box Hill City Oval between a combined team of his two former VFL clubs, Richmond and Hawthorn, and a Box Hill team augmented with other VFL and VFA star players, including John Coleman and Bill Hutchison. Including the gate and donations, £400 was raised from a crowd of 6,000 people; Box Hill 17.11 (113) defeated Hawthorn–Richmond 12.8 (80).

== See also ==
- List of VFA/VFL Premiers
