= Bob Muir (footballer) =

Australian rules footballer, born 1907

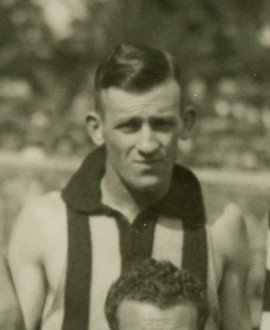
- Muir during his Collingwood career

Personal information
- Full name: Robert Muir
- Born: 6 April 1907; Boulder, Western Australia
- Died: 11 June 1973 (aged 66); Abbotsford, Victoria
- Original team: Fairfield
- Height: 175 cm (5 ft 9 in)
- Weight: 79 kg (174 lb)

Playing career^{1}
Years	Club	Games (Goals)
1927–29, 1931–32	Collingwood	33 (4)
1933–34	Footscray	22 (1)
1934	Fitzroy	2 (0)
Total		57 (5)
- ^{1} Playing statistics correct to the end of 1934.

Robert Muir (6 April 1907 – 11 June 1973) was an Australian rules footballer who played with Collingwood, Footscray and Fitzroy in the Victorian Football League (VFL).

Under Jock McHale, Collingwood won premierships in each of Muir's first three seasons at the club but he didn't participate in any of the finals campaigns. He missed the entire 1930 VFL season when Collingwood made it four in a row. He finally got regular game time in 1932 and made 17 appearances for the year, including two finals. It was however his last season with Collingwood and he finished his VFL career with stints at Footscray and Fitzroy.

Muir continued playing football in the VFA, with Preston, which he coached in 1938 when Wyn Murray resigned during the season.
