= Ray Riddell =

Australian rules footballer, born 1918

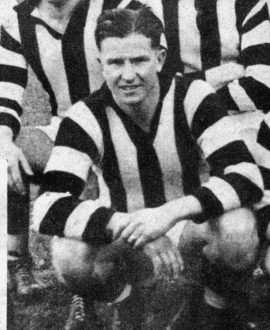
- Riddell in 1945

Personal information
- Full name: Norman Raymond Riddell
- Born: 26 March 1918; Thornbury, Victoria
- Died: 10 November 2013 (aged 95); Essendon, Victoria
- Original team: East Brunswick/Northcote
- Height: 178 cm (5 ft 10 in)
- Weight: 86 kg (190 lb)

Playing career^{1}
Years	Club	Games (Goals)
1944–46	Collingwood	5 (0)
- ^{1} Playing statistics correct to the end of 1946.

Norman Raymond Riddell (26 March 1918 – 10 November 2013) was an Australian rules footballer who played with Collingwood in the Victorian Football League (VFL) during the 1940s.

Riddell's VFL career was limited due to the war, as he was at the time a Leading Aircraftman with the RAAF. He played twice in the 1944 VFL season and his only appearance in 1945 was a preliminary final, which Collingwood lost. Riddell played in two further games in 1946. He briefly coached Preston in 1951, as a replacement for Reg Ryan who left before the season concluded.
