= Jack Blackman =

Australian rules footballer (1920–1978)

- Blackman with Preston in 1950

Personal information
- Born: 29 January 1920; Hawthorn, Victoria
- Died: 15 June 1978 (aged 58); Heidelberg, Victoria
- Original team: Tooronga
- Height: 177 cm (5 ft 10 in)
- Weight: 85 kg (187 lb)

Playing career^{1}
Years	Club	Games (Goals)
1939–40, 1944–46	Hawthorn	87 (14)
1947-49	Preston	62 (21)
1950-53	Horsham	? (?)
- ^{1} Playing statistics correct to the end of 1946.

Career highlights
- J. J. Liston Trophy: 1949; Laurie Hill Trophy: 1948; Hawthorn best-and-fairest: 1944

Jack Blackman (29 January 1920 – 15 June 1978) was an Australian rules footballer who played for Hawthorn in the Victorian Football League (VFL) and Preston in the Victorian Football Association (VFA). He won the J. J. Liston Trophy in 1949 as the VFA's best and fairest player.

== Career ==
Blackman was a centre half back and first played for Hawthorn in 1939. He did not play between 1940 and 1944 due to his war service in the Royal Australian Navy as a lieutenant. When he returned in 1944 he did not miss a game all season and won Hawthorn's best and fairest.

In 1947, Blackman crossed to Victorian Football Association club Preston as captain-coach without a clearance. He played there under throw-pass rules for three years, and he won the J. J. Liston Trophy in 1949.

The following year he transferred to play for Horsham as their captain-coach from 1950 to 1953.

Blackman served in the Royal Australian Navy from 1940 to 1945.
