= Billy McGee (footballer) =

Australian rules footballer and coach (1878–1939)

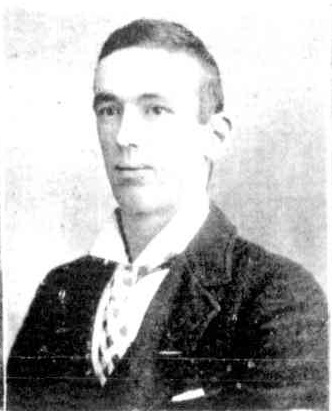
- McGee in July 1899

Personal information
- Full name: William John McGee
- Born: 27 February 1878; South Melbourne, Victoria
- Died: 28 August 1939 (aged 61); Albert Park, Victoria
- Original team: Port Melbourne
- Height: 183 cm (6 ft 0 in)
- Weight: 81 kg (179 lb)
- Position: Centreman/Wingman

Playing career^{1}
Years	Club	Games (Goals)
1903–06	South Melbourne	51 (29)

Coaching career
Years	Club	Games (W–L–D)
1911	Preston	13 (1–12–0)
- ^{1} Playing statistics correct to the end of 1906.

William John McGee (27 February 1878 – 28 August 1939) was an Australian rules footballer who played for South Melbourne in the Victorian Football League (VFL).

A centreman and wingman, McGee was a member of Port Melbourne's inaugural Victorian Football Association (VFA) premiership team in 1897 and captained the club from 1900 until 1902.

McGee, who led Port to another premiership in 1901, joined South Melbourne in 1903 and gave them good service in four seasons. He was the South Melbourne captain in 1904 and 1905. In his final VFL season, McGee kicked 17 goals, with four of them coming in a win over Geelong.

He continued at Port Melbourne for five more years from 1907 and finished with 97 VFA games. During his time at the club, McGee had a stint as coach. He was named as a wingman in Port's official 'Team of the Century' when it was announced in 2003.

In 1911, McGee took over as captain-coach of Preston in the VFA from George Sparrow, who resigned after a 90-point loss to Footscray in round 5.
