= Shannon Gibson =

Australian rules footballer

Personal information
- Full name: Shannon Gibson
- Born: 7 November 1975 (age 50)
- Original team: Northern Knights
- Draft: 23rd overall, 1993 AFL draft
- Height: 183 cm (6 ft 0 in)
- Weight: 77 kg (170 lb)
- Position: Forward

Playing career^{1}
Years	Club	Games (Goals)
1995–97	Hawthorn	25 (18)
1998	Collingwood	3 (0)
Total		28 (18)
- ^{1} Playing statistics correct to the end of 1998.

Shannon Gibson (born 7 November 1975) is a former Australian rules footballer who played with Hawthorn and Collingwood in the Australian Football League (AFL) during the 1990s.

Gibson was recruited by Hawthorn with the 23rd pick of the 1993 AFL draft, after earning 'Best on Ground' honours for the Northern Knights in their TAC Cup final win over the Western Jets. He kicked two goals and two behinds on his AFL debut, a win over the previous year's Grand Finalists Geelong at Kardinia Park.

In his three seasons at Hawthorn, Gibson was unable to cement a place in the team but did kick four goals against Geelong in 1997 and three goals in a win over Melbourne a week later. He was traded to Collingwood at the end of the 1997 season, for Paul Sharkey, who did not end up playing a game for Hawthorn. Gibson himself only made three appearances with Collingwood, suffering from a hamstring injury throughout the year.

He returned to Preston once he was delisted and began playing with the Northern Bullants, at the time called the Preston Knights. After topping their goal-kicking in 1999, Gibson was captain of the Bullants from 2000 to 2003.
