= John Williams (Australian footballer, born 1940) =

Australian rules footballer (1940–2019)

Personal information
- Full name: John Leonard Williams
- Born: 13 April 1940
- Died: 9 October 2019 (aged 79)
- Original team: Brunswick YCW
- Height: 185 cm (6 ft 1 in)
- Weight: 84.5 kg (186 lb)

Playing career^{1}
| Years | Club | Games (Goals) |
| 1959–62 | Carlton | 25 (12) |
- ^{1} Playing statistics correct to the end of 1962.

John Leonard Williams (13 April 1940 – 9 October 2019) was an Australian rules footballer who played with Carlton in the Victorian Football League (VFL).

Williams's son Mark played for Carlton and Footscray.

== Sources ==
- Hillier, K. (2004) Like Father Like Son, Pennon Publishing, Melbourne. ISBN 1-877029-73-4.
