= 1910 VFA season =

1910 premiership season
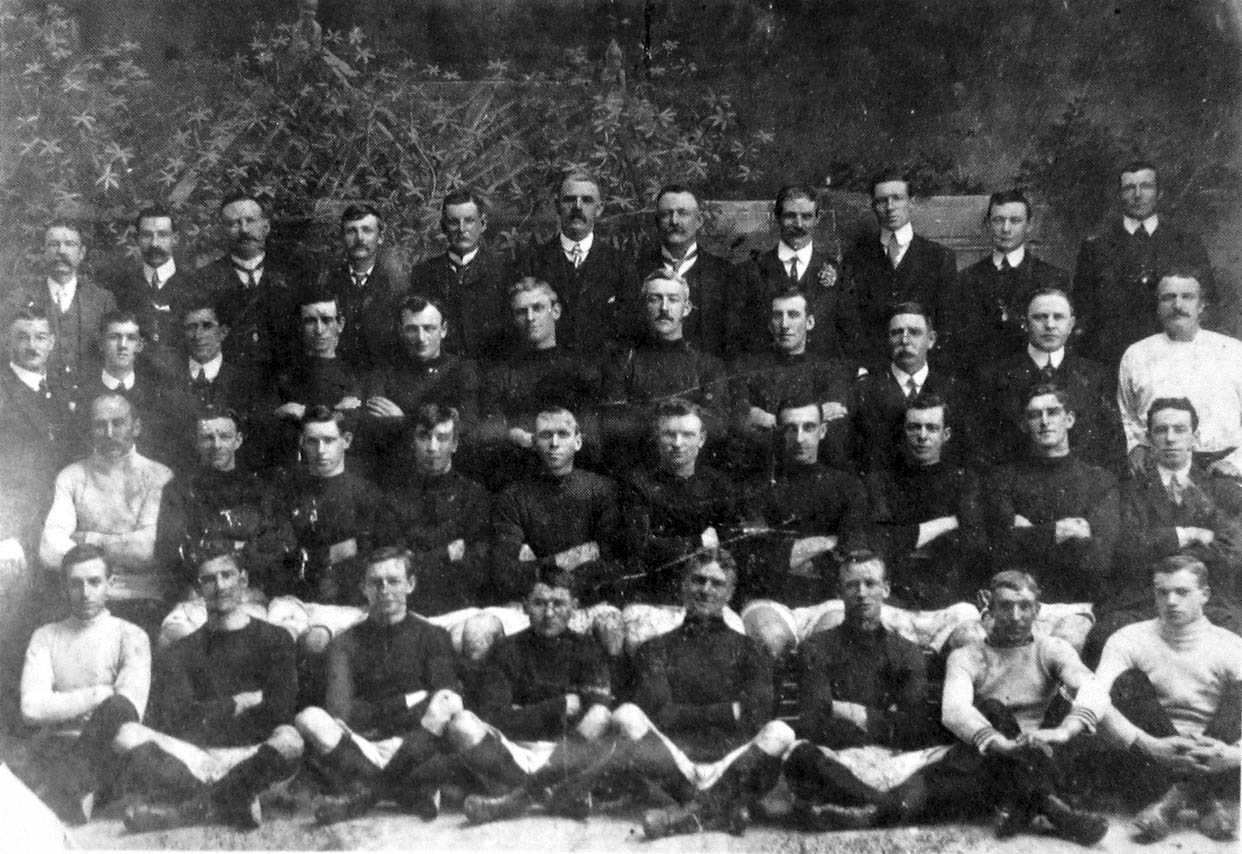
- North Melbourne, premiers
- Teams: 10
- Premiers: North Melbourne; 3rd premiership
- Minor premiers: North Melbourne; 2nd minor premiership

The 1910 VFA season was the 34th season of the Victorian Football Association (VFA).

The premiership was won by the North Melbourne Football Club, after it defeated Brunswick by 29 points in the 1910 VFA Grand Final. It was the club's third premiership, and the first since it was reformed after briefly ceasing to exist in 1908.

== Home-and-away season ==
The home-and-home season was played over eighteen rounds, with each club playing the others twice; then, the top four clubs contested a finals series under the amended Argus system to determine the premiers for the season.

=== Ladder ===
1910 VFA ladder
Pos	Team	Pld	W	L	D	PF	PA	PP	Pts
1	North Melbourne (P)	18	15	2	1	1344	630	213.3	62
2	Essendon	18	15	2	1	1266	674	187.8	62
3	Brunswick	18	14	4	0	1254	800	156.8	56
4	Prahran	18	11	7	0	1273	862	147.7	44
5	Port Melbourne	18	10	8	0	1037	1049	98.9	40
6	Footscray	18	9	9	0	1044	894	116.8	36
7	Williamstown	18	8	10	0	1018	922	110.4	32
8	Brighton	18	4	14	0	876	1152	76.0	16
9	Northcote	18	3	15	0	828	1416	58.5	12
10	Preston	18	0	18	0	578	2119	27.3	0

Rules for classification: 1) points; 2) percentage; 3) number of points for.
(P) Premiers

=== Finals ===
	Semi Finals
Saturday, 17 September	Essendon 5.9 (39)	def.	Prahran 2.7 (19)	North Melbourne Recreation Reserve (crowd: 12,000)
Saturday, 24 September	North Melbourne 6.8 (44)	def. by	Brunswick 7.8 (50)	North Melbourne Recreation Reserve (crowd: 20,000)

	Preliminary Final
Saturday, 1 October	Essendon 6.11 (47)	def. by	Brunswick 8.4 (52)	North Melbourne Recreation Reserve (crowd: 15,000)
The finals were originally scheduled to begin on 10 September, but were postponed by one week.

=== Grand Final ===
1910 VFA Grand Final
Saturday, 8 October	North Melbourne	def.	Brunswick	North Melbourne Recreation Reserve (crowd: 25,000)
1.1 (7); 5.6 (36); 6.10 (46); 9.14 (68)	Q1; Q2; Q3; Final	4.3 (27); 4.3 (27); 5.8 (38); 5.9 (39)	Umpires: Kendall
Caine 5, Barker, Elliott, Hardy, McCann	Goals	McKenzie 2, Chase, Corrigan, Mills

== Notable events ==
- Preston became the first club to concede more than 2,000 points in a season.
- Frank Caine (North Melbourne) was the Association's leading goalkicker for the season. He kicked 70 goals during the home-and-home matches, and 75 goals overall. Jack Hutchinson (Port Melbourne) was second with 54 goals.
- A new premiership trophy was donated to the Association, which would be awarded each year to the premiers, before being awarded permanently to the first club to win it twice consecutively or three times overall.
