= 1904 VFA season =

1904 premiership season
- Teams: 10
- Premiers: North Melbourne; 2nd premiership
- Minor premiers: Richmond; 2nd minor premiership

The 1904 Victorian Football Association season was the 28th season of the Australian rules football competition. The premiership was won by the North Melbourne Football Club in controversial circumstances, after minor premiers Richmond forfeited the challenge final in protest at the appointment of umpire. It was North Melbourne's second premiership in a row.

== Ladder ==
The home-and-away season was played over eighteen rounds, with each club playing the others twice; then, the top four clubs contested a finals series under the amended Argus system to determine the premiers for the season.

1904 VFA ladder
| Pos | Team | Pld | W | L | D | PF | PA | Pts |
|---|---|---|---|---|---|---|---|---|
| 1 | Richmond | 18 | 15 | 2 | 1 | 1008 | 583 | 62 |
| 2 | Footscray | 18 | 14 | 3 | 1 | 864 | 547 | 58 |
| 3 | North Melbourne (P) | 18 | 13 | 5 | 0 | 927 | 545 | 52 |
| 4 | Port Melbourne | 18 | 13 | 5 | 0 | 881 | 593 | 52 |
| 5 | West Melbourne | 18 | 10 | 8 | 0 | 835 | 616 | 40 |
| 6 | Williamstown | 18 | 10 | 8 | 0 | 763 | 655 | 40 |
| 7 | Brunswick | 18 | 7 | 11 | 0 | 691 | 1031 | 28 |
| 8 | Prahran | 18 | 4 | 14 | 0 | 778 | 985 | 16 |
| 9 | Essendon Town | 18 | 3 | 15 | 0 | 613 | 925 | 12 |
| 10 | Preston | 18 | 0 | 18 | 0 | 447 | 1327 | 0 |

Rules for classification: 1) points; 2) percentage; 3) number of points for.
(P) Premiers

== Finals series ==
| | Semi Finals |
| Saturday, 10 September | Richmond 4.15 (39) | def. by | North Melbourne 5.11 (41) | East Melbourne Cricket Ground (crowd: 8,000) |
| Saturday, 17 September | Footscray 7.12 (54) | def. | Port Melbourne 5.7 (37) | East Melbourne Cricket Ground (crowd: 8,000) |

| | Preliminary Final |
| Saturday, 24 September | Footscray 5.2 (32) | def. by | North Melbourne 6.13 (49) | East Melbourne Cricket Ground (crowd: 12,000) |

=== Final ===
The challenge final for the major premiership was scheduled for Saturday, 1 October at the East Melbourne Cricket Ground. However, on Wednesday 27 September, Richmond informed the Association that it would not play the final if Mr Allen was appointed as the umpire. The Association refused to appoint an alternative umpire, so Richmond refused to play; accordingly, the match was scratched and North Melbourne was awarded the premiership.

==== Background to Richmond's decision ====
Allen was regarded by all of the clubs in the Association, including Richmond, as one of its most competent and unbiased decision-makers, and he was accordingly appointed to umpire in all four finals in 1904; but he had drawn criticism for his poor control over rough play in two of the semi-finals, which ultimately led to Richmond's protest.

Before the third quarter in the semi-final between Richmond and North Melbourne on 10 September, Richmond accused several of the North Melbourne players of wearing iron spikes in their boots, and raised its complaint with Allen. North Melbourne captain Noonan refused to allow Allen to inspect his players' boots, and after a delay of about fifteen minutes, play resumed without North Melbourne's boots having been inspected. Richmond went on to lodge a complaint to the Association against Allen for failing to insist upon the inspection. According to Association secretary Mr T. J. Evans, Allen had inspected the North Melbourne players' boots prior to the team leaving the pavilion, and that Noonan had refused to submit to a second inspection on the grounds that it was only minutes later. Noonan was reprimanded by the Association for the refusal.

Allen was formally appointed as umpire for the challenge final on Wednesday, 14 September, with no objections from the Richmond delegate present at the appointment. During the week, Allen personally received a sarcastic letter from Richmond secretary, Geoffrey Peckham-Beachcroft, in which was enclosed a book of rules; this letter was submitted by Allen to an Association general meeting on Saturday 17 September. On Tuesday, 20 September, the Association first received correspondence from Richmond regarding its complaint against Allen's handling of the boot inspection in the semi-final; the letter was dated Tuesday 13 September. On Saturday 26 September, Allen umpired the semi-final between Footscray and North Melbourne, and attracted heavy criticism for keeping poor control over the game, allowing too much rough play, and permitting North Melbourne to engage in persistent time-wasting tactics.

According to Peckham-Beachcroft, the Richmond captain and several of its players had become concerned about Allen's lack of control over the game, so they did not wish to take the field against North Melbourne under those circumstances. As a result, the committee informed the Association on Wednesday 27 September that it would not play the match unless Allen's appointment as umpire were overturned and he be replaced by another candidate. Richmond lobbied the Association to make a new appointment to as late as the evening of Friday 30 September, but the Association refused to do so. This was in large part because there had been no procedural irregularity with Allen's appointment; Richmond had objected to Allen's performances by letter, but the Richmond delegate present at Allen's appointment had raised no objections. Some delegates, most vocally Mr Harris from West Melbourne, were also motivated by ensuring that one club should not be allowed to dictate to the entire Association.

As gate takings from finals were divided amongst the clubs, Richmond's refusal to play had a financial impact felt across all ten clubs. Williamstown, for example, recorded in its 1905 annual general meeting that its bank balance was almost £20 poorer as a direct result of the cancelled final.

This incident remains the only time that an Association team has forfeited a premiership-deciding final. Port Melbourne nearly staged a walk-off during the second quarter of the 1967 Division 1 Grand Final which would have resulted in a forfeit, but in that case the club committee intervened to ensure the team continued to play.

1904 VFA Grand Final
Saturday, 1 October (cancelled) | Richmond | def. by | North Melbourne | East Melbourne Cricket Ground
Q1; Q2; Q3; Final | Umpires: Allen
The match was scratched and North Melbourne was awarded the premiership after Richmond objected to the umpire appointed for the match and refused to play.
