= Charlie Stewart (footballer, born 1922) =

Australian rules footballer and coach (1922–1997)

- Badge featuring Stewart in 1950

Personal information
- Full name: Charles Rupert Stewart
- Born: 12 January 1922
- Died: 23 July 1997 (aged 75)

Playing career
Years	Club	Games (Goals)
1941; 1946–1951	Preston	94 (5)

Coaching career
Years	Club	Games (W–L–D)
1963–1964	Preston	

Career highlights
- Preston captain: 1950; VFA premiership coach: 1963

Charles Rupert Stewart (12 January 1922 – 23 July 1997) was an Australian rules football player and coach.

== Playing career ==
Stewart played for Preston in the Victorian Football Association between 1941 and 1951, with the years 1942–1946 interrupted by World War II. Stewart captained the team in 1950. He was the last pre-war player to play for Preston.

Following the 1950 season, Stewart indicated he would retire, and possibly move into coaching. In March 1951, he had applied for a clearance to Abbotsford to take up the role of captain-coach. However, by July that year, Stewart was back at Preston.

== Coaching career ==
After moving into coaching in 1960, Stewart coached Preston teams to four premierships in as many years. This included coaching premierships in three separate grades between 1961 and 1963. In 1964 he resigned as head coach after Preston were relegated to the VFA second division.

Stewart coached Reservoir in the Northern Metropolitan Football League for the 1965 season and following that year became club president for the next four seasons (1966–1969). He would reprise the presidential role again for four more seasons over the next decade, in 1972, and from 1978–1980. He was granted life membership of the Reservoir Football Club for his efforts.

== Death ==
Stewart died in July 1997 and was buried in Preston Cemetery.
