= Mark Williams (Australian footballer, born 1964) =

Australian rules footballer (born 1964)

Personal information
- Full name: Mark P. Williams
- Born: 18 March 1964 (age 62)
- Original team: St Mark's
- Draft: No. 7, 1989 pre-season draft
- Height: 184 cm (6 ft 0 in)
- Weight: 76 kg (168 lb)

Playing career^{1}
Years	Club	Games (Goals)
1983–88	Carlton	19 (10)
1989–90	Footscray	14 (13)
Total		33 (23)
- ^{1} Playing statistics correct to the end of 1990.

Mark P. Williams (born 18 March 1964) is a former Australian rules footballer who played with Carlton and Footscray in the Victorian/Australian Football League (VFL/AFL).

Before starting his VFL career, Williams played at Fawkner and then St Mark's, where he was recruited from. A small forward, he never made more than five appearances in a season for Carlton. He spent most of his time in the reserves and was a member of their 1986 and 1987 reserves premiership teams.

Williams, whose father John also played with Carlton, was let go by his club and picked up by Footscray at the 1989 Pre-Season Draft. He starred on his debut, against his former club in the opening round of the 1989 VFL season with 35 disposals but only played two seasons. He moved to Victorian Football Association club Coburg in 1991, and then to Sandringham in 1992, where he played two seasons and was part of the 1992 premiership team.

He has had great success as a coach in the Victorian Football League. From 1998 to 2003, Williams was in charge of the Northern Bullants. In 2004 he became coach of Sandringham and steered them to premierships in his first three seasons, the first VFA/VFL coach to achieve the feat since Gary Brice in the early 1980s. He joined the AFL in 2008 when appointed as a development coach at Melbourne At the end of the 2011 season he left Melbourne and became an assistant coach at Richmond Football Club. In 2015 he was Richmond's midfield spread coach.

He was inducted into the Sandringham Football Club Hall of Fame in 2014.
