= Andre Gianfagna =

Australian rules football umpire

Personal information
- Nickname: Gia
- Born: 4 December 1987 (age 38)
- Original team: Northern Knights (TAC Cup)
- Draft: No. 51, 2006 rookie draft
- Height: 183 cm (6 ft 0 in)
- Other occupation: Teacher

Playing career^{1}
Years	Club	Games (Goals)	
2006	Melbourne	0 (0)	

Umpiring career
Years	League	Role	Games
2016–	AFL	Field umpire	71
- ^{1} Playing statistics correct to the end of 2006.

Andre Gianfagna (born 4 December 1987) is an Australian rules football umpire field officiator in the Australian Football League. He was formerly AFL-listed as a player at Melbourne.

He was drafted to Melbourne Football Club with pick 51 in the 2006 rookie draft and was delisted at the end of his first season without playing a senior game.

He then captained the Northern Blues in the Victorian Football League, before joining the AFL rookie umpiring list in 2016. He was upgraded to the senior list for the 2018 season and made his umpiring debut that year.
