= Ray Potter =

Australian rules footballer

Personal information
- Full name: Thomas Raymond Potter
- Born: 4 June 1925
- Died: 23 February 2000 (aged 74); Stawell, Victoria
- Original team: Stawell
- Height: 193 cm (6 ft 4 in)
- Weight: 83 kg (183 lb)
- Position: Forward

Playing career^{1}
Years	Club	Games (Goals)
1945, 1947	Richmond	2 (3)
1947–1951	Preston	34 (145)
- ^{1} Playing statistics correct to the end of 1951.

Career highlights
- VFA leading goalkicker: 1948

Thomas Raymond Potter (4 June 1925 – 23 February 2000) was an Australian rules footballer who played for Richmond in the Victorian Football League (VFL) during the 1940s.

Potter shared his league debut with Don Fraser in the opening round of the 1945 VFL season, when Richmond took on Footscray at Punt Road. He kicked two goals to help his club win by 10 points. Potter didn't appear again until early in the 1947 season when Richmond lost to Melbourne.

The forward had more success in the Victorian Football Association, kicking 84 goals for Preston in 1948 to become the first player from the club to win the VFA leading goalkicker award.
