= Ken Greenwood =

Australian rules footballer (1941–2021)

Personal information
- Full name: Kenneth Richard Greenwood
- Born: 15 December 1941
- Died: 18 April 2021 (aged 79)
- Original team: South Bendigo
- Height: 188 cm (6 ft 2 in)
- Weight: 96 kg (212 lb)
- Position: Ruckman

Playing career^{1}
Years	Club	Games (Goals)
1962–66	Carlton	55 (19)
1967–72	Footscray	73 (7)
Total		128 (26)
- ^{1} Playing statistics correct to the end of 1972.

Kenneth Richard Greenwood (15 December 1941 – 18 April 2021) was an Australian rules footballer who played for Carlton and Footscray in the Victorian Football League (VFL).

A ruckman, Greenwood was recruited from South Bendigo and was an understudy to John Nicholls during his time at Carlton. In just his eighth league game, Greenwood appeared in the 1962 VFL Grand Final, which Carlton lost. He never established a regular place in the team until 1964 but even then received limited game time due to Nicholls.

Greenwood, after trying to get a clearance to Melbourne, was given to Footscray in order to keep Ian Robertson, who was part of Footscray's recruitment zone, at Carlton. In 1967, his first season, Greenwood was runner up in the 'Best and Fairest' to John Jillard by one vote. His VFL career ended in 1972 when he badly injured his knee and he spent the 1973 season as captain-coach of Preston.
