= Ian Robertson (Australian rules footballer) =

Australian rules footballer

Personal information
- Full name: Ian Anthony Robertson
- Nickname: Robbo
- Born: 25 January 1946 (age 80); Footscray, Victoria
- Original team: Dalyston
- Height: 185 cm (6 ft 1 in)
- Weight: 92 kg (203 lb)

Playing career^{1}
Years	Club	Games (Goals)
1966–1974	Carlton	125 (85)
1974	Footscray	4 (1)
Total		129 (86)
- ^{1} Playing statistics correct to the end of 1974.

Ian Anthony Robertson (born 25 January 1946 in Footscray, Victoria) is a former Australian rules footballer in the VFL and football commentator with Channel 7.

Robertson was born in Footscray and recruited to the Carlton Football Club from Dalyston after the Footscray Football Club refused a request for a trial with the club. Robertson debuted in 1967 with the Blues and was a solid midfielder.

The fact that he was taken from Footscray's recruitment zone became an issue two years into Robertson's career, when the Bulldogs asked for their rights to him as a player. Ken Greenwood was cleared to the Bulldogs from Carlton and the dispute was resolved.

In 1968, 1970 and 1972, Robertson was a member of Carlton's premiership sides. He had played 125 games and kicked 86 goals for Carlton between 1966 and 1974, before moving to Footscray (in an ironic twist) late in 1974, only notching up 4 games and 1 goal.

In the 1980s Robertson became a Football commentator for the Seven Network, continuing this role until 2001 when the Seven Network lost the rights. He was signed with Fox Footy Channel in 2002 but left the network midway through the 2002 season for unknown reasons. In 2004 he was a radio commentator for 95.5 K-Rock in Geelong.
