= 1948 VFA season =

67th season of the Victorian Football Association

1948 VFA premiership season
- Teams: 12
- Premiers: Brighton; 1st premiership
- Minor premiers: Williamstown; 3rd minor premiership

The 1948 VFA season was the 67th season of the Victorian Football Association (VFA), an Australian rules football competition played in the state of Victoria.

Brighton won the VFA premiership for the first and only time, defeating Williamstown by nine points in the 1948 VFA Grand Final.

== Ladder ==
The home-and-home season was played over twenty matches, before the top four clubs contested a finals series under the Page–McIntyre system to determine the premiers for the season.

Pos	Team	Pld	W	L	D	PF	PA	PP	Pts
1	Williamstown	20	16	4	0	2133	1543	138.2	64
2	Brunswick	20	16	4	0	2217	1712	129.5	64
3	Brighton (P)	20	13	7	0	2313	2037	113.5	52
4	Northcote	20	12	8	0	1925	1724	111.7	48
5	Oakleigh	20	12	8	0	2167	1972	109.9	48
6	Preston	20	12	8	0	2146	1971	108.9	48
7	Camberwell	20	10	10	0	1957	2052	95.4	40
8	Sandringham	19	7	12	0	1900	2240	84.8	28
9	Coburg	19	6	13	0	1939	2128	91.1	24
10	Prahran	20	6	14	0	2005	2339	85.7	24
11	Port Melbourne	20	5	15	0	1968	2412	81.6	20
12	Yarraville	20	4	16	0	1850	2390	77.4	16

Rules for classification: 1) points; 2) percentage; 3) number of points for.
(P) Premiers

== Finals ==
=== Semi-finals ===
	Semifinals
Saturday, 18 September	Brighton 17.23 (125)	def.	Northcote 12.13 (85)	St Kilda Cricket Ground (crowd: 12,000)
Saturday, 25 September	Williamstown 17.13 (115)	def.	Brunswick 9.20 (74)	St Kilda Cricket Ground (crowd: 15,000)

=== Preliminary final ===
	Preliminary final
Saturday, 2 October	Brunswick 12.14 (86)	def. by	Brighton 14.16 (100)	St Kilda Cricket Ground (crowd: 11,000)

=== Grand Final ===
1948 VFA Grand Final
Saturday, 9 October	Williamstown	def. by	Brighton	St Kilda Cricket Ground (crowd: 18,000)
4.3 (27); 7.4 (46); 9.6 (60); 13.7 (85)	Q1; Q2; Q3; Final	2.4 (16); 7.7 (49); 10.10 (70); 13.16 (94)	Umpires: Merrington
MacPherson 3, Redmond 3, Salvas 3, Matthews 2, Peacock, Todd	Goals	Douglas 4, Warburton 3, Burke 2, Heims 2, Adamson, McIndoe

== Awards ==
- The leading goalkicker for the home-and-home season was Ray Potter (Preston), who kicked 84 goals in the season.
- The J. J. Liston Trophy was won by Rus McIndoe (Brighton), who polled 44 votes. Jack Blackman (Preston) was second with 38 votes and Reg Shaw (Brunswick) was third with 28 votes.
- Williamstown won the seconds premiership. Williamstown 15.16 (106) defeated Oakleigh 14.18 (102) in the Grand Final, played as a curtain raiser to the firsts Grand Final on 9 October.

== Notable events ==
- On 26 June, Sandringham 11.11 (77) defeated Coburg 9.20 (74); but, Coburg protested the result due to a timekeeping error which had resulted in the final quarter being played five minutes short. The Association quashed the result of the match, and determined that a replay should be played if the match were to have an influence on the final four. Both teams were ultimately well out of finals contention, so the replay was not held, and the teams are credited with playing only nineteen matches for the season.
- Prahran played most of its home matches at Elsternwick Park during the year, sharing the ground with Brighton, because Toorak Park was unavailable due to top-dressing after the first few weeks of the season.
- Preston missed the finals on percentage, after losing its last home-and-home match to wooden-spooner Yarraville by one point, 16.10 (106) def. by 15.17 (107).
- The 1948 VFL Grand Final was drawn, so the Association Grand Final was played on the same day as the League Grand Final Replay. The Association considered postponing its Grand Final by a week to avoid competing for the gate, but the motion was defeated 12–8.

== See also ==
- List of VFA/VFL premiers
