= Len Clark (footballer) =

Australian rules footballer

Personal information
- Full name: Len Clark
- Born: 30 January 1947 (age 79)
- Original team: Reservoir Colts
- Height: 180 cm (5 ft 11 in)
- Weight: 76 kg (168 lb)
- Position: Forward

Playing career^{1}
Years	Club	Games (Goals)
1965–69	Collingwood	14 (10)
- ^{1} Playing statistics correct to the end of 1969.

Len Clark (born 30 January 1947) is a former Australian rules footballer who played with Collingwood in the Victorian Football League (VFL). He later played with Preston in the Victorian Football Association (VFA) and was the league leading goalkicker in 1972.
