= Graeme Renwick =

Australian rules footballer and coach

Personal information
- Full name: Graeme L. Renwick
- Born: 4 May 1952 (age 74)
- Original team: Doncaster
- Height: 188 cm (6 ft 2 in)
- Weight: 81 kg (179 lb)
- Position: Forward

Playing career^{1}
Years	Club	Games (Goals)
1970–73	Fitzroy	35 (22)
- ^{1} Playing statistics correct to the end of 1973.

Graeme L. Renwick (born 4 May 1952) is a former Australian rules footballer who played with Fitzroy in the Victorian Football League (VFL) during the early 1970s.

Renwick, from Doncaster, played as a tall forward and spent four seasons at Fitzroy. His VFL career ended as a result of an eye injury. He later played for Preston in the VFA and was the club's captain coach in the 1977 season.
