= Harry Hunter =

Australian rules footballer (1902–1971)

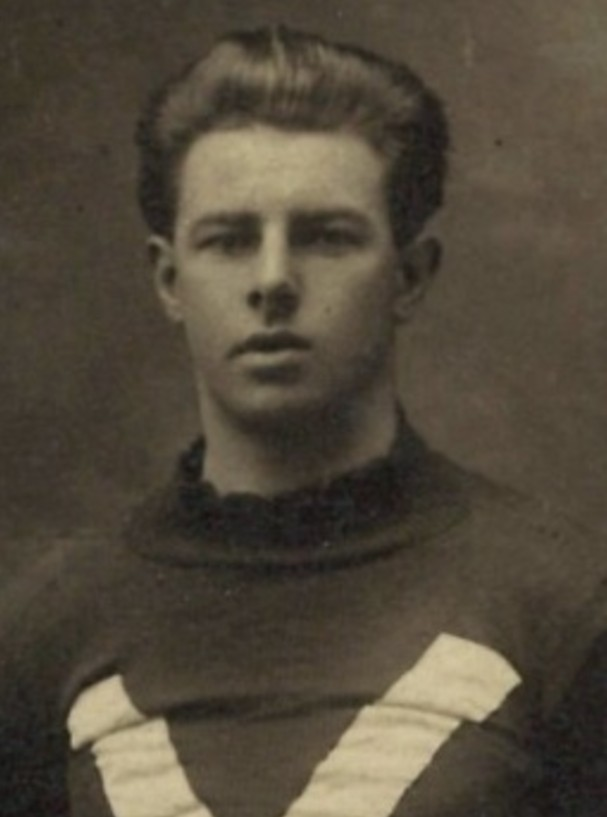
- Hunter circa 1920s

Personal information
- Full name: Harry Hunter
- Born: 24 February 1902
- Died: 23 April 1971 (aged 69)
- Original team: Footscray (VFA)
- Height: 184 cm (6 ft 0 in)
- Weight: 85 kg (187 lb)
- Position: Full-back

Playing career^{1}
Years	Club	Games (Goals)
1921–27, 1929	Essendon	109 (9)

Coaching career
Years	Club	Games (W–L–D)
1939	Essendon	2 (2–0–0)
- ^{1} Playing statistics correct to the end of 1929.

Harry Hunter (24 February 1902 – 23 April 1971) was an Australian rules footballer who played for Essendon in the Victorian Football League (VFL) during the 1920s.

Hunter, who started out in the Victorian Football Association with Footscray, played as a defender and spent most of his time at full-back. He was a late withdrawal due to a leg injury from Essendon's 1923 Grand Final team and missed the premiership but made up for it the following season when they went back to back, Hunter was a regular Victorian interstate representative.

Hunter transferred to Albury in 1928 and captain-coached them to the Ovens & Murray Football League premiership that year. He also coached the Ovens & Murray Football League side against Victoria in Wangaratta in 1928 too.

He returned to Essendon for one final season in 1929.

After retiring as a player, Hunter concentrated on his coaching career and had stints at both Yarraville and Preston. He was joint coach, alongside Dick Reynolds, of Essendon for two games in the 1939 VFL season, both of which they won.
