= Danny Warr =

Australian rules footballer (1905–1972)

- Warr with St Kilda in 1929

Personal information
- Full name: Daniel John Warr
- Born: 22 October 1905
- Died: 27 August 1972 (aged 66)
- Original team: Preston
- Height: 170 cm (5 ft 7 in)
- Weight: 76 kg (168 lb)
- Position: Rover

Playing career^{1}
Years	Club	Games (Goals)
1926–27, 1931–36	Preston	144 (317)
1928–29	St Kilda	37 (48)
- ^{1} Playing statistics correct to the end of 1936.

Daniel John Warr (22 October 1905 – 27 August 1972) was an Australian rules footballer who played for St Kilda in the Victorian Football League (VFL).

Warr spent two seasons at St Kilda and his 37 games consisted of one final in 1929. He was a goal-kicking rover and managed 24 goals in each of his two years at the club.

After captain-coaching Rochester in 1930, Warr returned to his original club Preston. He won a Recorder Cup in 1934, captain-coached them in 1935 and topped Preston's goal-kicking every year from 1932 to 1935 (54, 37, 57 and 42 goals respectively).

His coaching career continued with stints at Camperdown (1937–1939) and Finley. After the war he moved to Canberra and was in charge of Eastlake from 1947 to 1953 with the exception of 1951 which he spent at Turner. He steered Eastlake to a premiership in 1948 and coached the ACT.
