= 1905 VFA season =

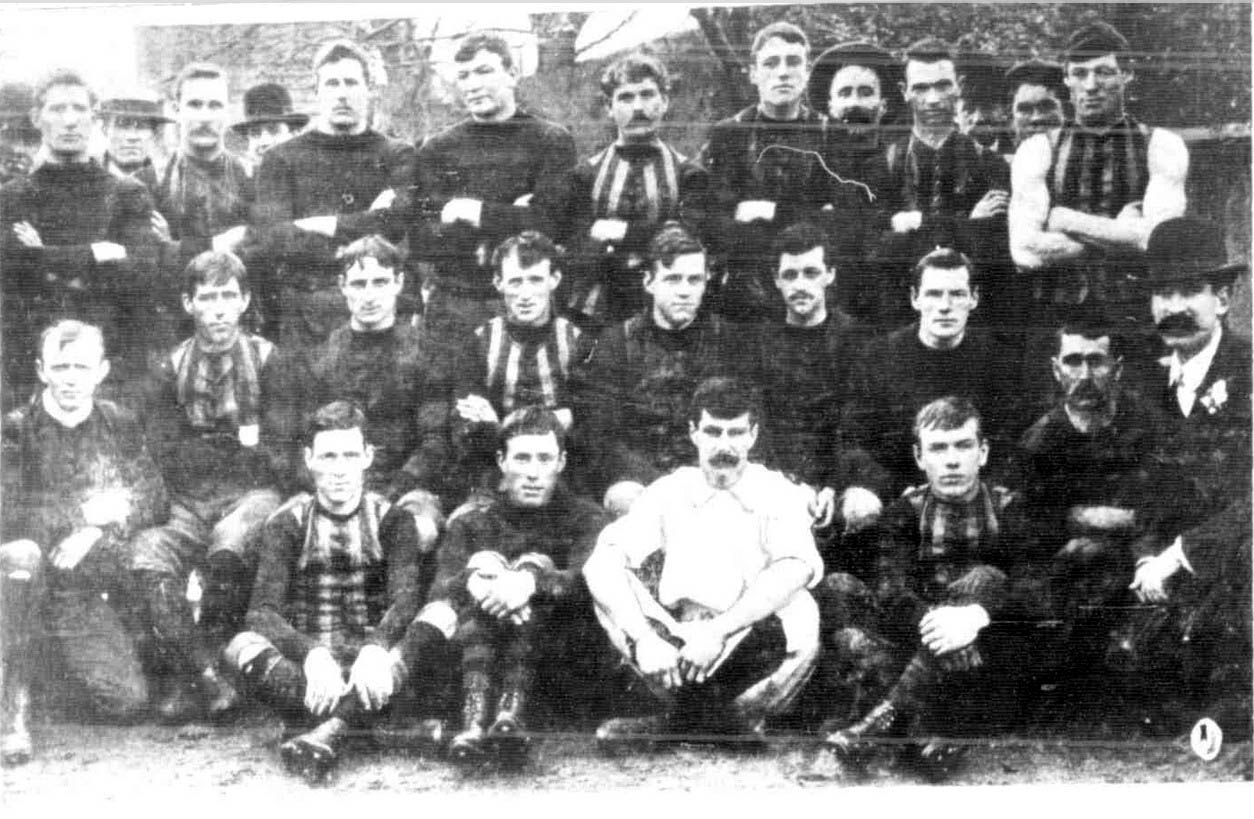
- Richmond – 1905 premiers

Overview
- Teams: 10
- Premiers: Richmond; 2nd premiership
- Minor premiers: North Melbourne; 1st minor premiership

The 1905 VFA season was the 29th season of the Victorian Football Association (VFA), an Australian rules football competition played in the state of Victoria.

The premiership was won by the Richmond Football Club, after defeating minor premiers North Melbourne by 25 points in the challenge final on 7 October. It was Richmond's second VFA premiership.

== Association membership ==
The Association membership was unchanged in 1905, but the Essendon Town Football Club changed its name to the Essendon Football Club at its annual general meeting in March, feeling entitled to do so as the only senior club playing its games in the town of Essendon at the time. As a consequence of this, there were two distinct senior Essendon Football Clubs with the same name playing in Melbourne from 1905 until 1921: one in the VFL, based in East Melbourne; and one in the VFA, based in Essendon.

At the time, the two Essendon clubs were typically known as Essendon (Association) and Essendon (League), Essendon (V.F.A.) and Essendon (V.F.L.), or Essendon (A.) and Essendon (L.) to distinguish them from each other where confusion was possible.

== Home-and-away season ==
The home-and-away season was played over eighteen rounds, with each club playing the others twice; then, the top four clubs contested a finals series under the amended Argus system to determine the premiers for the season.

== Ladder ==
1905 VFA ladder
Pos	Team	Pld	W	L	D	PF	PA	Pts
1	North Melbourne	18	15	3	0	895	515	60
2	Richmond (P)	18	14	4	0	1130	570	56
3	Williamstown	18	14	4	0	925	541	56
4	Port Melbourne	18	12	6	0	875	559	48
5	West Melbourne	18	12	6	0	792	605	48
6	Essendon	18	7	11	0	735	833	28
7	Brunswick	18	6	12	0	741	984	24
8	Footscray	18	6	12	0	574	833	24
9	Prahran	18	3	15	0	476	975	12
10	Preston	18	1	17	0	415	1149	4

Rules for classification: 1) points; 2) percentage; 3) number of points for.
(P) Premiers

== Finals ==
=== Semi-finals ===
	Semi Finals
Saturday, 16 September	North Melbourne 5.5 (35)	def.	Williamstown 3.8 (26)	East Melbourne Cricket Ground (crowd: 7,000)
Saturday, 23 September	Richmond 11.8 (74)	def.	Port Melbourne 7.6 (48)	East Melbourne Cricket Ground

=== Final ===
	Final
Saturday, 30 September	North Melbourne 3.10 (28)	def. by	Richmond 7.6 (48)	East Melbourne Cricket Ground

=== Grand Final ===
1905 VFA Grand Final
Saturday, 7 October	North Melbourne	def. by	Richmond	East Melbourne Cricket Ground (crowd: 15,000 – 20,000)
0.2 (2); 3.3 (21); 3.3 (21); 5.6 (36)	Q1; Q2; Q3; Final	2.2 (14); 3.3 (21); 8.6 (54); 9.7 (61)	Umpires: Freame
Considine 2, Groves, C. Londerigan, M. Londerigan	Goals	Knell 3, Ricketts 2, Sykes 2, McDonald, Megson

== See also ==
- Victorian Football Association/Victorian Football League History (1877-2008)
- List of VFA/VFL Premiers (1877–2007)
