= Charlie McSwain =

Australian rules footballer (born 1901)

Personal information
- Full name: Charles Farquar McSwain
- Born: 12 October 1901; St Arnaud, Victoria
- Died: 12 October 1976 (aged 75); Mildura, Victoria
- Original team: Merbein/Preston
- Height: 182 cm (6 ft 0 in)
- Weight: 79 kg (174 lb)
- Position: Defender

Playing career^{1}
Years	Club	Games (Goals)
1925–30	Carlton	68 (13)
1931–32	Northcote (VFA)	40 (1)
1933–34	Preston (VFA)	32 (25)
- ^{1} Playing statistics correct to the end of 1934.

Career highlights
- 1932 VFA Premiership

Charles Farquar McSwain (12 October 1901 – 12 October 1976) was an Australian rules footballer who played with Carlton in the Victorian Football League (VFL).

McSwain spent six seasons at Carlton after arriving from Merbein. He put together 25 consecutive games from 1926 to 1927 and played in a Preliminary Final in 1929, but Carlton lost to Richmond by a goal.

The next stage of McSwain's career took place in the Victorian Football Association (VFA), firstly at Northcote in 1931, with whom he appeared in a narrow Grand Final loss to Oakleigh, as a follower. However the next season he played in a winning VFA Grand Final, this time at full-back.

Appointed captain-coach of Preston in 1933, he steered them to third position in his second and last year in charge, but missed the finals through injury.
