= Jimmy Goonan =

Australian rules footballer and coach (1897–1988)

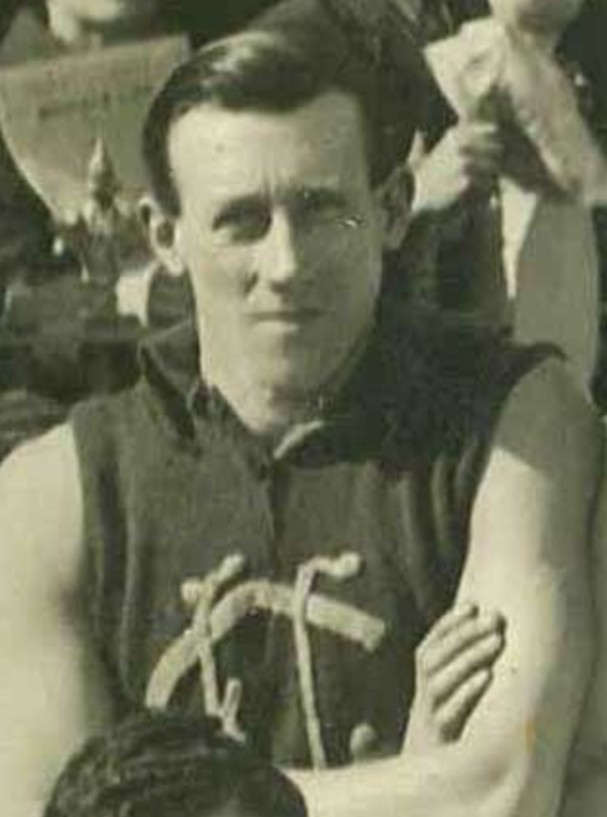
- Goonan with Carlton in the 1920s

Personal information
- Full name: James Edward Goonan
- Born: 9 February 1897; Carlton, Victoria
- Died: 24 June 1988 (aged 91); Caulfield South, Victoria
- Original team: Brunswick
- Height: 175 cm (5 ft 9 in)
- Weight: 70 kg (154 lb)

Playing career^{1}
Years	Club	Games (Goals)
1919–21	Brunswick (VFA)	36 (5)
1922–24, 1927	Carlton	22 (1)
1929–30	Preston (VFA)	34 (4)
- ^{1} Playing statistics correct to the end of 1927.

James Edward Goonan (9 February 1897 – 24 June 1988) was an Australian rules footballer who played with Carlton in the Victorian Football League (VFL) during the 1920s.

Goonan spent three seasons with Carlton's seniors without establishing a place in the team when in 1925 he was picked to captain-coach the seconds. A wingman, he immediately had an influence by steering the club to three successive premierships from 1926 to 1928. In 1927 he also played some games with the seniors.

Originally from Brunswick, Goonan returned to the VFA in 1929 and captain-coached Preston for two seasons.
