= Harold Martin (footballer) =

Australian rules footballer and coach (born 1950)

- Martin in April 2025

Personal information
- Full name: Harold Martin
- Born: 5 January 1950 (age 76)
- Original team: Northcote Park
- Height: 188 cm (6 ft 2 in)
- Weight: 83 kg (183 lb)

Playing career^{1}
Years	Club	Games (Goals)
1968	Fitzroy	1 (0)
- ^{1} Playing statistics correct to the end of 1968.

Harold Martin (born 5 January 1950) is a former Australian rules footballer who played for Fitzroy in the Victorian Football League (VFL) and coached in the Victorian Football Association.

Martin made only one appearance with the seniors at Fitzroy, with his debut coming in a 52-point loss to Carlton at Princes Park late in the 1968 VFL season. He then embarked on a long career in the VFA and captain-coached Sunshine from 1975 to 1977. As captain-coach of Preston, he took the club to a Grand Final in 1978, where they were beaten by Prahran, with Martin involved in an infamous fist fight with Sam Kekovich. Martin steered Preston to another Grand Final in 1981 but his team against ended the day disappointed. His next appointment was at Coburg, which he coached to third place in 1982. After winning a 'Best and Fairest' with Coburg in 1983, Martin joined Reservoir as coach and steered them to the 1984 division two DVFL premiership. He was coach of Box Hill in 1987 and 1988.
