= Noel Zunneberg =

Australian rules footballer

Personal information
- Full name: Noel Wallace Zunneberg
- Born: 13 August 1946 (age 80)
- Original team: Croydon
- Height: 188 cm (6 ft 2 in)
- Weight: 85 kg (187 lb)
- Position: Centre half back

Playing career^{1}
Years	Club	Games (Goals)
1967–72	Fitzroy	71 (3)
1972–75	Preston	52 (84)
1970–78	Commonwealth Bank	interstate carnivals
- ^{1} Playing statistics correct to the end of 1972.

Career highlights
- 1970 Brownlow Medal – 12 votes; 1972 Preston B&F runner-up; 1974 Preston B&F; 1975 Preston captain

Noel Wallace Zunneberg (born 13 August 1946) is a former Australian rules footballer who played with Fitzroy. Often considered as one of the most underrated centre half backs, Zunneberg was a strong mark and a regular player for Fitzroy for five years. After 1972, he moved to Preston in the Victorian Football Association, and he served as its captain in 1975.
