= Shane Halas =

Australian rules footballer (born 1961)

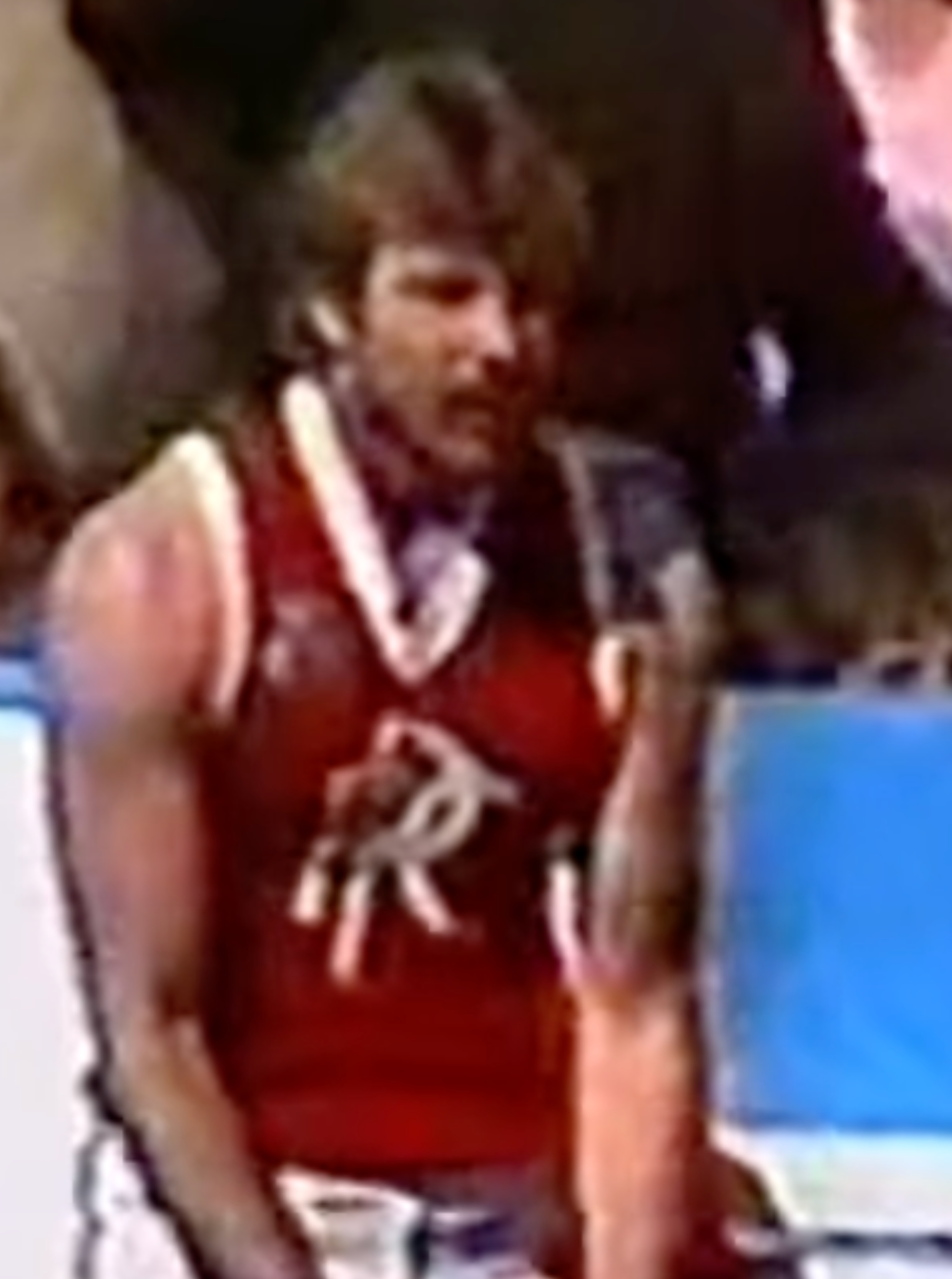
- Halas playing for Preston in 1982

Personal information
- Full name: Shane Halas
- Born: 30 December 1961 (age 64)
- Original team: Preston (VFA)
- Height: 185 cm (6 ft 1 in)
- Weight: 89 kg (196 lb)

Playing career^{1}
Years	Club	Games (Goals)
1985	Fitzroy	11 (11)
- ^{1} Playing statistics correct to the end of 1988.

Shane Halas (born 30 December 1961) is a former Australian rules footballer who played for Preston in the Victorian Football Association (VFA) and Fitzroy in the Victorian Football League (VFL).

== Career ==
Halas played 11 games for Fitzroy in the 1985 season, and scored as many goals.
