= Ray Shaw (Australian footballer) =

Australian rules footballer and coach (born 1954)

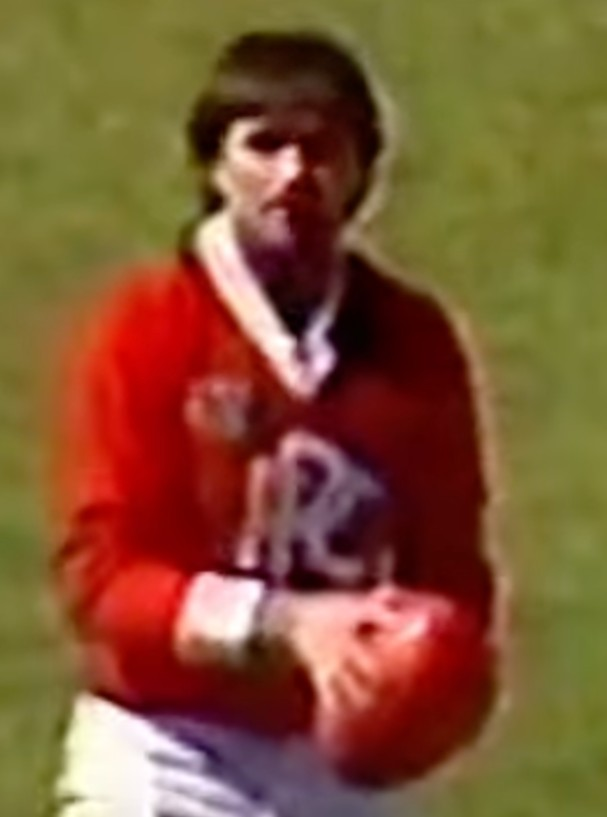
- Shaw playing for Preston in 1982

Personal information
- Born: 27 April 1954 (age 72)
- Original team: Macleod–Rosanna
- Height: 175 cm (5 ft 9 in)
- Weight: 70 kg (154 lb)

Playing career^{1}
Years	Club	Games (Goals)
1973, 1982-1984	Preston	52 (87)
1974–1981	Collingwood	146 (200)
1986-1987	Waverley	12 (8)
Total		210 (295)
- ^{1} Playing statistics correct to the end of 1981.

Career highlights
- Collingwood Best and Fairest 1978; Club captain (1979–1980)

Ray Shaw (born 27 April 1954) is a former Australian rules footballer who played for Collingwood in the Victorian Football League (VFL). His younger brothers Tony and Neville as well as his two sons Heath and Rhyce also played for Collingwood.

Shaw began his senior career at Preston in the Victorian Football Association (VFA), where he won a J. J. Liston Trophy in 1973 for the Best and Fairest player in the VFA first division. A Collingwood Best and Fairest Award winner, Shaw captained Collingwood to the 1979 Escort Cup Grand Final, where they defeated Hawthorn Football Club to win their first senior title since 1958.

After a fallout with Collingwood officialdom in 1981, Shaw returned to Preston as captain-coach and led them to the 1983 and 1984 premierships. Although he missed playing in 1983 because of a broken leg, he was one of the best-on-ground in the 1984 Grand Final, his first premiership as a player after seven unsuccessful attempts. Shaw was captain-coach of Greensborough for a year, before returning to the VFA with Division 2 club Waverley in 1986 and 1987.

Shaw coached various clubs in the lower suburban competitions around Melbourne, including Lalor and Hurstbridge and Oakleigh District.

Preston awarded the Ray Shaw Trophy to the player that finished second in its best and fairest awards every season.
