= Ted Henrys =

Australian rules footballer (1924–2014)

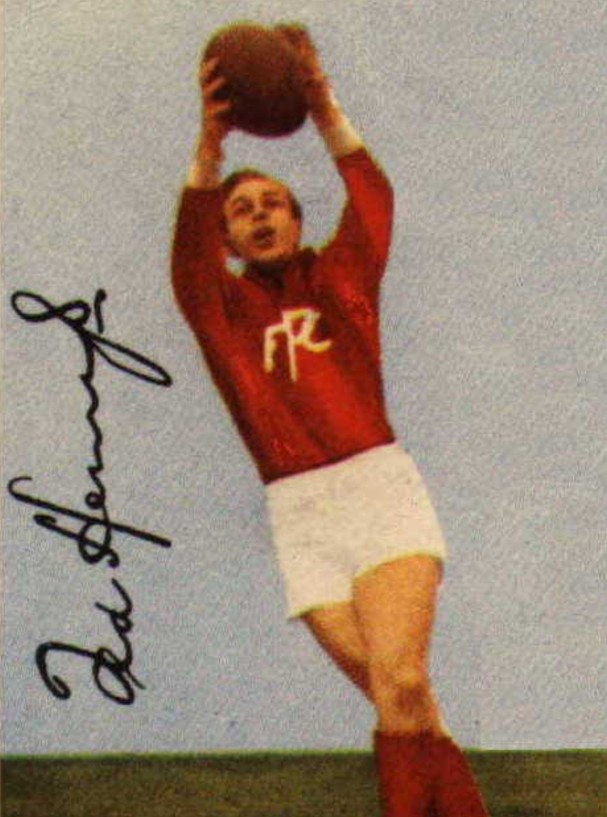
- Henrys with Preston in the 1950s

Personal information
- Full name: Edward Raymond Henrys
- Born: 24 October 1924; Moonee Ponds, Victoria
- Died: 11 March 2014 (aged 89)
- Height: 180 cm (5 ft 11 in)
- Weight: 78 kg (172 lb)

Playing career^{1}
Years	Club	Games (Goals)
1946–1950	Brunswick	70
1951–1955	Preston	98
Total		168
- ^{1} Playing statistics correct to the end of 1955.

Edward Raymond Henrys (15 October 1924 – 11 March 2014) was an Australian rules footballer who played in the Victorian Football Association (VFA) during the late 1940s and early 1950s. He is noted for being one of only four players from the Association to be selected in the All-Australian team at an interstate carnival.

He enlisted in the RAAF on 29 October 1941 under the name Edward Raymond Henry, serving until the end of the war.

Henrys started his VFA career at Brunswick in 1946 and played 70 games for the club by the time he left at the conclusion of the 1950 season. He crossed to Preston in 1951 and cemented a full back spot. For three successive seasons from 1951 to 1953 he won Preston's 'Best and Fairest' award and in the last of those years won the J. J. Liston Trophy. After his last season in 1955 he retired with 98 games to his name for Preston. In the 1960s he spent time as Preston's assistant coach and despite being aged over 40 played the occasional game for the club, bringing up his 100 game milestone.

In 1953 he represented the VFA at the Adelaide Carnival and was named in the inaugural All-Australian side beside his teammate Frank Johnson.

After retirement, Henrys joined with Phil Gibbs to broadcast the VFA Football on Channel 0.
