= Barry Mitchell (footballer) =

Australian rules footballer (born 1965)

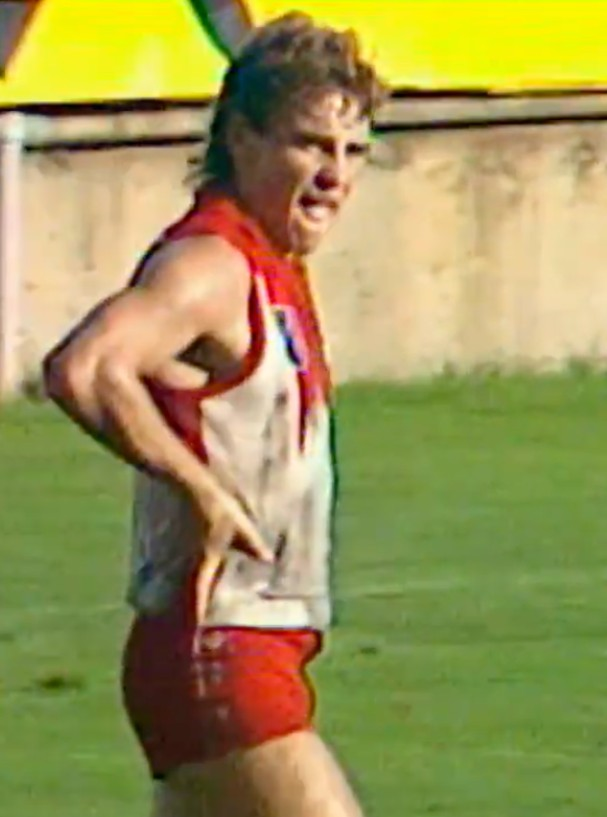
- Mitchell playing for Sydney in 1987

Personal information
- Born: 7 December 1965 (age 60); Yarrawonga, Victoria
- Original teams: Northvale JFC (Mulgrave, VIC)
- Height: 173 cm (5 ft 8 in)
- Weight: 70 kg (154 lb)

Playing career^{1}
Years	Club	Games (Goals)
1984–1992	Sydney Swans	170 (214)
1993	Collingwood	13 (8)
1994–1996	Carlton	38 (25)
Total		221 (247)
- ^{1} Playing statistics correct to the end of 1996.

Career highlights
- 1991 E. J. Whitten Medalist; 1991 Bob Skilton Medalist; All Australian 1991; Sydney leading goalkicker 1988

Barry Mitchell (born 7 December 1965) is a former Australian rules footballer who played with the Sydney Swans, Carlton and Collingwood in the Australian Football League (AFL).

Mitchell played as a rover and was consistently one of the top possession getters in the league every season. After retiring from Carlton in 1996, he kept involved with the club by becoming their runner. He was promoted by the Blues to assistant coach in 2003, but left in 2007 to join Hawthorn, again as an assistant, and was part of the premiership team in 2008. He left the Hawks at the end of the premiership winning season to join Fremantle as an assistant coach. At the end of the 2011 season he left Fremantle to return to Melbourne after his son Tom Mitchell was drafted by the Sydney Swans under the father–son rule.
