= John McArthur (footballer) =

Australian rules footballer

Personal information
- Born: 10 September 1938
- Original team: Dookie College
- Height: 183 cm (6 ft 0 in)
- Weight: 86 kg (190 lb)

Playing career^{1}
| Years | Club | Games (Goals) |
| 1958–1963 | Hawthorn | 61 (10) |
- ^{1} Playing statistics correct to the end of 1963.

John McArthur (born 10 September 1938) is a former Australian rules footballer who played for Hawthorn in the VFL. He played as a half back flanker. He played in Hawthorn's 1961 Premiership team, named at Centre Half Back.
