= Peter Weightman =

Australian rules footballer and coach (born 1949)

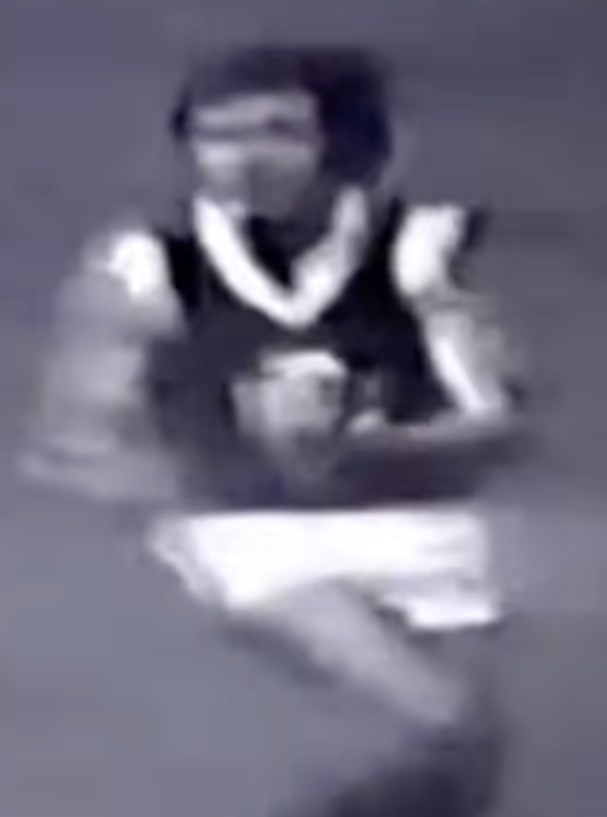
- Weightman playing for Preston in 1971

Personal information
- Full name: Peter Weightman
- Born: 15 May 1949 (age 77)
- Height: 170 cm (5 ft 7 in)
- Weight: 67 kg (148 lb)
- Position: Rover

Playing career^{1}
Years	Club	Games (Goals)
1969	Fitzroy	1 (1)

Coaching career
Years	Club	Games (W–L–D)
1985–88	Preston	76 (46–29–1)
1994–97	Preston	70 (23–47–0)
- ^{1} Playing statistics correct to the end of 1969.

Peter Weightman (born 15 May 1949) is a former Australian rules football player and coach who played for Fitzroy in the Victorian Football League (VFL) and Preston in the Victorian Football Association (VFA). He later served as Preston's senior coach on two separate occasions in the 1980s and 1990s.

== Career ==
Weightman, who grew up playing in the Preston District Junior Football Association, played his only VFL game for Fitzroy in the 1969 VFL season. A rover, he kicked a goal in a 24-point loss to Hawthorn at Princes Park.

He played in the Victorian Football Association (VFA) for Preston from 1970 until 1976. From 1977 until 1978 he played with Yarrawonga in the Ovens & Murray Football League, before returning to Preston in 1979, both as a senior player and has the seconds coach. He retired from playing in 1980, finishing with a total of 118 senior games for Preston, but had continued success as coach of the club's seconds and thirds, leading both to premierships. Weightman was appointed senior coach at Preston in 1985 and remained in the job for four seasons. They played finals in three of those years and were notably eliminated from the 1988 finals series with a 93-point loss to Coburg. He would have continued in 1989 but instead took up an offer to join the Hawthorn under-19s coaching staff.

When David Dickson resigned as Preston coach in 1994 due to a work promotion, Weightman returned as senior coach. He had another four season stint, making him Preston's longest serving coach.

In 2008 he joined Collingwood as an assistant coach.

He is the father of Lisa Jane Weightman, a marathon runner who competed in the Beijing Olympics.
