= Wyn Murray =

Australian rules footballer

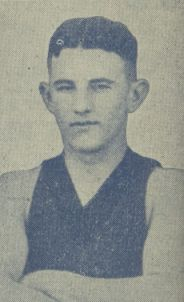

Personal information
- Full name: George Wynyatt Murray
- Born: 4 July 1908; Bendigo, Victoria
- Died: 21 December 1947 (aged 39); Fitzroy, Victoria
- Original team: South Bendigo
- Height: 178 cm (5 ft 10 in)
- Weight: 81 kg (179 lb)
- Position: Defender

Playing career^{1}
Years	Club	Games (Goals)
1929–34	Melbourne	65 (4)
- ^{1} Playing statistics correct to the end of 1934.

George Wynyatt "Wyn" Murray (4 July 1908 – 21 December 1947) was an Australian rules footballer who played with Melbourne in the Victorian Football League (VFL).

== Family ==
The son of Alfred Wynyatt Murray (1868-1936), and Johanna Murray (1874-1940), née Gleeson, George Wynyatt Murray was born on 4 July 1908.

He married Lexie Avenel Thornton in 1932 at Brunswick, Victoria.

His daughter, Patricia Joan, born 1932, was a winner of the Australian Dancing Championship many times and also represented Australia overseas, with her husband, Ron Shelton. His son, Peter Thornton, born 1935, graduated from Duntroon in 1955, RMIT (Communications Engineering) in 1961 and was promoted to Lieutenant Colonel. He commanded an RA Signals unit in the Vietnam War in 1968 and then went on to a successful business career.

== Education ==
He was educated at Marist College Bendigo.

== Football ==
=== South Bendigo (BFL) ===
Murray played for South Bendigo in the Bendigo Football League in 1927 and 1928. In 1927, his first senior season, he was chosen on the half-forward flank in the combined BFL side defeated a VFL team, in Bendigo, on 13 August 1927.

=== Melbourne (VFL) ===
Murray was cleared to Melbourne in 1929, and gave the club solid service in six seasons. Murray, a left footer, missed just one game in his first two years with the club but was in and out of the side after that. A half back flanker, he represented the VFL against South Australia in 1933.

=== Preston (VFA) ===
Cleared from Melbourne to Preston in 1934, he won their best player award in 1937. He retired from the game that season, but returned in 1938 when appointed captain-coach for the year.

== Police force ==
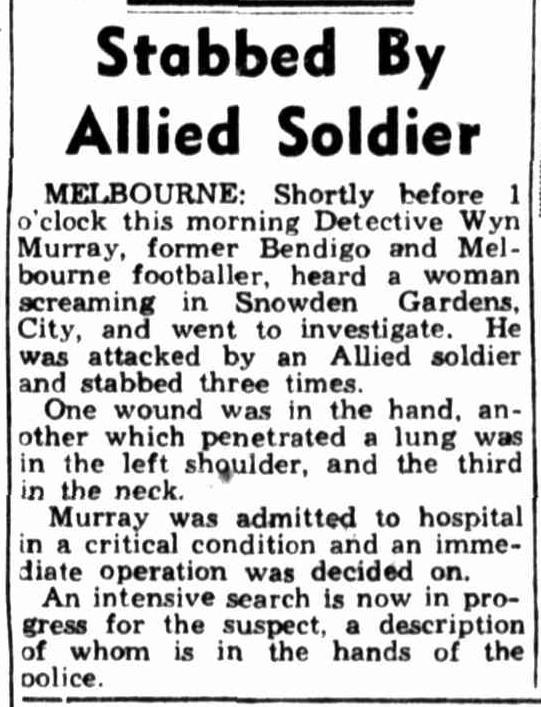
The (Brisbane) Telegraph, 26 February 1944.

Football was not a professional sport in the 1930s; and Murray had an extended career in the Victorian Police Force, becoming a detective in the Criminal Investigation Bureau (CIB).

In February 1944 he was stabbed while attempting to assist a young woman in distress in the Snowden Gardens, across Princes Bridge (the site of Hamer Hall, Melbourne today).

== Air Force ==
In May 1944, Murray enlisted in the Royal Australian Air Force (RAAF) and he served in Madang, New Guinea for eight months in 1945. He remained in the RAAF until mid–1947, being discharged only four months before his death.

== Death ==
No longer in the Police Force, he died (possibly of alcoholic poisoning) in a shabby rooming house in Fitzroy, Victoria on 21 December 1947.
