= Reg Ryan (Australian footballer) =

Australian rules footballer

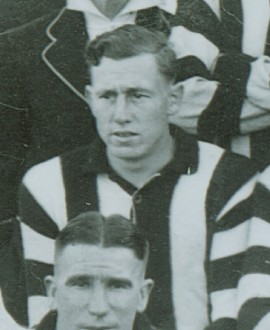
- Ryan in 1942

Personal information
- Full name: Reginald Gordon Ryan
- Born: 23 February 1920; West Melbourne, Victoria
- Died: 16 May 2005 (aged 85)
- Original team: Victoria Brewery
- Height: 183 cm (6 ft 0 in)
- Weight: 84 kg (185 lb)
- Position: Defender

Playing career^{1}
Years	Club	Games (Goals)
1939–40	North Melbourne	3 (0)
1942	Collingwood	6 (0)
1946–50	North Melbourne	63 (0)
Total		72 (0)
- ^{1} Playing statistics correct to the end of 1950.

Reginald Gordon "Dodger" Ryan (23 February 1920 – 16 May 2005) was an Australian rules footballer who played with North Melbourne and Collingwood in the Victorian Football League (VFL).

A defender, Ryan's initial stint at North Melbourne was unsuccessful, managing just three VFL games in his two seasons. After leaving the club he joined Williamstown and through good performances was recruited back to the league by Collingwood. He made six appearances in the 1941 season but then did not play football for a period due to his service in World War II. As the conflict neared its end he was back playing at Williamstown and starred from full-back in their 1945 premiership team. North Melbourne gave him another chance in 1946 and over the next five seasons he got regular games and took part in their 1949 finals series. Most notably, however, he was a centre half back in the 1950 VFL Grand Final loss to Essendon, their first ever premiership decider. In 1951 Preston lured him back to the VFA as captain-coach but he did not see out the season.
