= Laurie Hill (Australian footballer) =

Australian rules footballer (1942–2014)

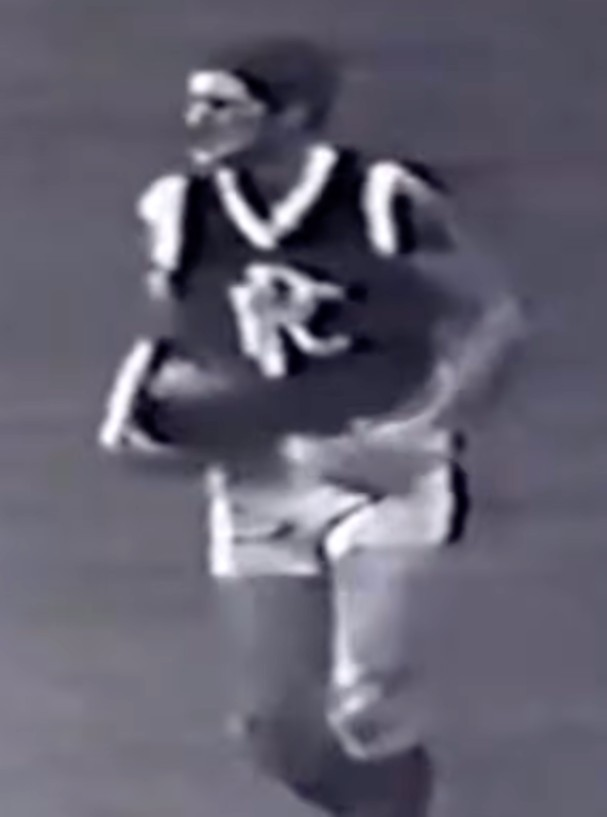
- Hill playing for Preston in 1971

Personal information
- Born: 18 July 1942
- Died: 22 May 2014 (aged 71)
- Original team: Thornbury
- Height: 180 cm (5 ft 11 in)
- Weight: 76 kg (168 lb)

Playing career^{1}
Years	Club	Games (Goals)
1962–69	Collingwood (VFL)	114 (21)
1969–73	Preston (VFA)	53 (18)
Total		167 (39)
- ^{1} Playing statistics correct to the end of 1973.

Career highlights
- Collingwood Life Member (2003); J. J. Liston Trophy (1969, 1971); Preston premiership player (1969)

Laurie Hill (18 July 1942 – 22 May 2014) was an Australian rules footballer who played for Collingwood in the Victorian Football League (VFL) during the 1960s.

A half back flanker, Hill played in losing grand finals for Collingwood in 1964 and 1966. He represented the Victorian interstate side in 1964 and 1965 and finished equal eighth in the 1964 Brownlow Medal.

After playing the opening game of the 1969 VFL season he was dropped to the seconds. Angered by the decision, he left Collingwood and joined Preston in the Victorian Football Association (VFA). In five seasons at the club he won two J. J. Liston Trophies, in 1969 and 1971. He was also a dual best and fairest winner and a premiership player in 1969. The club's best and fairest award is named for Hill.

== Links ==
- Laurie Hill's playing statistics from AFL Tables
- Laurie Hill at AustralianFootball.com
