= George Sparrow =

Australian rules footballer and coach

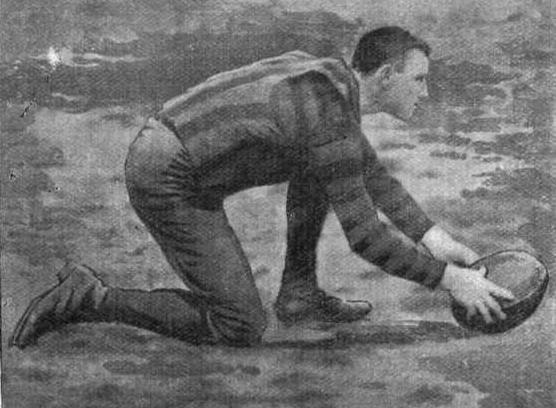
- George Sparrow, 1895

Personal information
- Full name: George Stephen Sparrow
- Born: 20 November 1869; St Kilda, Victoria
- Died: 6 April 1933 (aged 63); Caulfield, Victoria
- Original team: St Kilda Esplanade

Playing career^{1}
Years	Club	Games (Goals)
1892–1896	Richmond (VFA)	86 (56)
1898	South Melbourne	14 (2)
1899	St Kilda	11 (0)
Total		111 (58)

Coaching career
Years	Club	Games (W–L–D)
1913, 1920, 1928–29	St Kilda	63 (37–26–0)
- ^{1} Playing statistics correct to the end of 1929.

Career highlights
- Richmond leading goalkicker 1892 (19) and 1893 (23); Richmond captain 1894–1895

George Stephen Sparrow (20 November 1869 – 6 April 1933) was an Australian rules footballer who played with South Melbourne and both played for and coached St Kilda in the Victorian Football League (VFL).

== Football ==
Nicknamed 'Sugar', Sparrow began his career in the Victorian Football Association playing for Richmond, where he was captain for two years.

He joined the VFL in its second season, and after having to sit out 1897 to gain a clearance, represented South Melbourne before switching to St Kilda the following year.

After retiring, Sparrow turned to coaching and was appointed senior coach of St Kilda in 1913. He coached the club to its first ever Grand Final: the Saints had defeated Minor Premiers Fitzroy in the Final, but under the rules at the time, Fitzroy had an automatic right of challenge, and they won the Grand Final the following week.

Sparrow quit as coach at the end of 1913, coaching five games as caretaker coach in 1920. He returned again in 1928, this time for a two-season stint, with the Saints finishing sixth, missing the finals on percentage. In 1929 he coached St Kilda to the finals again, with a Semi Final loss ending the club's season.

He finished with a winning percentage of 58.73% as a coach.
