= 1923 WAFL season =

Australian rules football season

- Teams: 6
- Premiers: East Perth; 5th premiership
- Minor premiers: East Perth; 5th minor premiership
- Sandover Medallist: "Digger" Thomas (East Perth)
- Bernie Naylor Medallist: Denis Coffey (East Fremantle)
- Matches played: 47

The 1923 WAFL season was the 39th season of the West Australian Football League. It saw East Perth set an unequalled WAFL record of five consecutive premierships, which in major Australian Rules leagues has only been beaten by SANFL club Port Adelaide with six straight from 1954 to 1959 and equalled by Sturt between 1966 and 1970. The Royals prevailed after two superb games with East Fremantle, who had had its last two home-and-away games cancelled due to undertaking a tour of Victoria and South Australia.

The top four teams was unchanged for the third successive season, and tailender Perth looked likely to suffer a winless season before winning its last match – a fate the Redlegs would suffer again in 2000.

== Home-and-away season ==
=== Round 1 ===
	Round 1
Saturday, 12 May (3:00 pm)	East Perth 17.8 (110)	def.	Subiaco 9.14 (68)	Perth Oval
Saturday, 12 May (3:00 pm)	East Fremantle 5.20 (50)	drew with	South Fremantle 7.8 (50)	Fremantle Oval
Saturday, 12 May (3:00 pm)	West Perth 7.17 (59)	def.	Perth 4.8 (32)	Leederville Oval
A brilliant last quarter allows East Perth to unfurl its 1922 pennant with an impressive win after Subiaco, fifth for the previous two seasons, outplayed it in general play for two-quarters.

=== Round 2 ===
	Round 2
Saturday, 19 May (3:00 pm)	Subiaco 7.11 (53)	def.	South Fremantle 4.14 (38)	Subiaco Oval
Saturday, 19 May (3:00 pm)	East Fremantle 8.11 (59)	def.	West Perth 5.11 (41)	Fremantle Oval
Saturday, 19 May (3:00 pm)	Perth 8.11 (59)	def. by	East Perth 10.15 (75)	WACA

=== Round 3 ===
	Round 3
Saturday, 26 May (3:00 pm)	Subiaco 6.15 (51)	def. by	East Fremantle 8.9 (57)	Subiaco Oval
Saturday, 26 May (3:00 pm)	East Perth 12.16 (88)	def.	West Perth 5.11 (41)	Perth Oval
Saturday, 26 May (3:00 pm)	South Fremantle 14.17 (101)	def.	Perth 14.6 (90)	Fremantle Oval
An excellent second quarter allows East Fremantle to remain unbeaten despite kicking only 3.5 (23) for three-quarters.

=== Round 4 ===
	Round 4
Saturday, 2 June (3:00 pm)	East Fremantle 7.9 (51)	def. by	East Perth 10.16 (76)	Fremantle Oval
Saturday, 2 June (3:00 pm)	West Perth 4.20 (44)	def.	South Fremantle 5.11 (41)	Leederville Oval
Saturday, 2 June (3:00 pm)	Perth 8.13 (61)	def. by	Subiaco 10.12 (72)	WACA
Despite kicking what remains, in terms of excess of behinds over goals the second most inaccurate score in their history, West Perth manage to overcome South Fremantle.; On 9 June, WAFL football was suspended for an interstate match.

=== Round 5 ===
	Round 5
Saturday, 16 June (3:00 pm)	Perth 11.4 (70)	drew with	East Fremantle 10.10 (70)	WACA
Saturday, 16 June (3:00 pm)	Subiaco 5.15 (45)	def. by	West Perth 9.9 (63)	Subiaco Oval
Saturday, 16 June (3:00 pm)	South Fremantle 7.10 (52)	def. by	East Perth 11.10 (76)	Fremantle Oval
This would prove the last WA(N)FL (or VFL/AFL) draw at the WACA until East Perth drew with Claremont in 1993; The match ended a run of twelve consecutive defeats by Perth, their longest until 1983 – though their 21-game winless streak remains a record.

=== Round 6 ===
	Round 6
Saturday, 23 June (3:00 pm)	Subiaco 7.10 (52)	def.	East Perth 6.11 (47)	Subiaco Oval
Saturday, 23 June (3:00 pm)	East Fremantle 8.10 (58)	def. by	South Fremantle 10.15 (75)	Fremantle Oval
Saturday, 23 June (3:00 pm)	Perth 4.10 (34)	def. by	West Perth 12.15 (87)	WACA
In an "unnecessarily rough" WACA game several casualties had to be treated after the match at the ground and Parkes of West Perth was taken to hospital.

=== Round 7 ===
	Round 7
Saturday, 30 June (3:00 pm)	East Perth 10.12 (72)	def.	Perth 5.7 (37)	Perth Oval
Saturday, 30 June (3:00 pm)	South Fremantle 5.12 (42)	def.	Subiaco 5.8 (38)	Fremantle Oval
Saturday, 30 June (3:00 pm)	West Perth 10.8 (68)	def. by	East Fremantle 10.9 (69)	Leederville Oval

=== Round 8 ===
	Round 8
Saturday, 7 July (3:00 pm)	West Perth 9.7 (61)	def. by	East Perth 11.14 (80)	Leederville Oval
Saturday, 7 July (3:00 pm)	East Fremantle 9.7 (61)	def.	Subiaco 6.13 (49)	Fremantle Oval
Saturday, 7 July (3:00 pm)	Perth 7.8 (50)	def. by	South Fremantle 7.18 (60)	WACA
The Leederville Oval match sees the first use of an electric bell in Australian football.

=== Round 9 ===
	Round 9
Saturday, 14 July (3:00 pm)	East Perth 10.9 (69)	def.	East Fremantle 7.8 (50)	Perth Oval
Saturday, 14 July (3:00 pm)	South Fremantle 8.11 (59)	def.	West Perth 8.8 (56)	Fremantle Oval
Saturday, 14 July (3:00 pm)	Subiaco 8.12 (60)	def.	Perth 7.6 (48)	Subiaco Oval
During the following weekend, Western Australia thrashed South Australia by the score of 13.13 (91) to 4.3 (27).

=== Round 10 ===
	Round 10
Saturday, 28 July (3:00 pm)	East Fremantle 16.19 (115)	def.	Perth 7.7 (49)	Fremantle Oval
Saturday, 28 July (3:00 pm)	East Perth 7.12 (54)	def. by	South Fremantle 8.8 (56)	Perth Oval
Saturday, 28 July (3:00 pm)	West Perth 7.7 (49)	def.	Subiaco 5.9 (39)	Leederville Oval

=== Round 11 ===
	Round 11
Saturday, 4 August (3:00 pm)	South Fremantle 9.2 (56)	def. by	East Fremantle 10.9 (69)	Fremantle Oval
Saturday, 4 August (3:00 pm)	East Perth 7.10 (52)	def.	Subiaco 5.7 (37)	Perth Oval
Saturday, 4 August (3:00 pm)	West Perth 11.12 (78)	def.	Perth 8.7 (55)	Leederville Oval

=== Round 12 ===
	Round 12
Saturday, 11 August (3:00 pm)	Perth 6.6 (42)	def. by	East Perth 9.14 (68)	WACA
Saturday, 11 August (3:00 pm)	East Fremantle 6.10 (46)	def.	West Perth 6.8 (44)	Fremantle Oval
Saturday, 11 August (3:00 pm)	Subiaco 12.10 (82)	def.	South Fremantle 7.9 (51)	Subiaco Oval
After a violent all-in-brawl with the scores level at half-time (for which no reports were made despite most players fighting even after a later inquiry), Subiaco take over for their last win of 1923.

=== Round 13 ===
	Round 13
Saturday, 18 August (3:00 pm)	Perth 6.21 (57)	def. by	South Fremantle 14.22 (106)	WACA
Saturday, 18 August (3:00 pm)	East Fremantle 6.18 (54)	def.	Subiaco 6.7 (43)	Fremantle Oval
Saturday, 18 August (3:00 pm)	West Perth 5.11 (41)	def.	East Perth 3.14 (32)	Leederville Oval

=== Round 14 ===
	Round 14
Saturday, 25 August (3:00 pm)	Subiaco 6.8 (44)	def. by	Perth 6.10 (46)	Subiaco Oval
Saturday, 25 August (3:00 pm)	South Fremantle 6.10 (46)	def. by	West Perth 9.7 (61)	Fremantle Oval
A trip by East Fremantle to Melbourne and Adelaide meant that Old Easts' game with East Perth was never played.; On this Saturday East Fremantle lost to 1922 premiers Fitzroy by the score of 9.5 (59) to 11.13 (79).; After 21 consecutive winless games, Perth win for the first time since Round 6 of 1922, edging out Subiaco and sealing the top four in doing so. Their win ended the most consecutive winless games in the WAFA/WAFL since the Maroons lost 24 in a row in 1902 and 1903.

=== Round 15 ===
	Round 15
Saturday, 1 September (3:00 pm)	South Fremantle 10.11 (71)	def. by	East Perth 12.14 (86)	Fremantle Oval
Saturday, 1 September (3:00 pm)	West Perth 10.23 (83)	def.	Subiaco 11.10 (76)	Leederville Oval
A trip by East Fremantle to Melbourne and Adelaide meant that Old Easts' game with Perth was never played.; On this Saturday East Fremantle lost to second-placed SAFL club Sturt 5.15 (45) to 7.5 (47) and on Wednesday beat seventh-placed Port Adelaide 10.13 (73 to 8.10 (58).

== Ladder ==
1923 WAFL ladder
Pos	Team	Pld	W	L	D	PF	PA	PP	Pts
1	East Perth (P)	14	11	3	0	985	718	137.2	44
2	West Perth	15	9	6	0	876	801	109.4	36
3	East Fremantle	13	8	3	2	809	741	109.2	36
4	South Fremantle	15	7	7	1	904	924	97.8	30
5	Subiaco	15	5	10	0	809	862	93.9	20
6	Perth	14	1	12	1	730	1067	68.4	6

Rules for classification: 1) points; 2) percentage; 3) number of points for.
(P) Premiers

== Finals ==
=== First semi-final ===
	First semi-final
Saturday, 15 September (3:00 pm)	East Perth 5.10 (40)	def.	West Perth 4.7 (31)	WACA (crowd: 6,087)
In a match marred by Perth’s wettest September on record and consequent extremely slippery conditions, a depleted East Perth, with 38-year-old coach Matson forced to strip, hold West Perth to 0.2 (2) with the wind in the last quarter and advance to the final.

=== Second semi-final ===
	Second semi-final
Saturday, 22 September (3:00 pm)	East Fremantle 9.21 (75)	def.	South Fremantle 5.3 (33)	Fremantle Oval (crowd: 4,947)
In their first WAFL match for over a month, East Fremantle completely outplay the Southerners.

=== Final ===
	Final
Saturday, 29 September (3:00 pm)	East Perth 5.12 (42)	def. by	East Fremantle 9.9 (63)	Subiaco Oval (crowd: 11,917)
East Perth’s 0.8 (8) with the wind in the second quarter ensures East Fremantle will force a rematch.

=== Grand Final ===
1923 WAFL Grand Final
Saturday, 6 October (3:00 pm)	East Perth	def.	East Fremantle	Subiaco Oval (crowd: 16,371)
1.2 (8); 4.5 (29); 5.7 (37); 9.9 (63)	Q1; Q2; Q3; Final	4.1 (25); 5.2 (32); 6.4 (40); 7.4 (46)	Umpires: Frank O‘Connor
Duffy 3, Owens 2, Harrold 2, Hebbard, Gaynor	Goals	Coffey 3, Cinoris 2, Collins, Smith
Fletcher (best on ground), Owens, Western, Sherlock, Brentnall, Herd, Duffy	Best	Cinoris, Buchanan, Truscott, Mudie, Clark, Baird
East Perth set an Australian record, winning a fifth consecutive premiership after coming from behind with brilliant determination led by an impassable half-back line.
