= Kevin Crowd =

Australian rules footballer

Personal information
- Full name: Kevin Richard Thomas Crowd
- Born: 25 August 1935 (age 91)
- Original team: Aquinas College

Playing career^{1}
Years	Club	Games (Goals)
1954–1958	East Perth	55 (3)
1959–1961	Claremont	46 (3)
- ^{1} Playing statistics correct to the end of 1961.

Kevin Richard Thomas Crowd (born 25 August 1935) was an Australian rules footballer who played for East Perth Football Club and Claremont Football Club in the West Australian Football League (WAFL).

Crowd grew up in Pemberton, Western Australia, and attended school at Aquinas College in Salter Point.

He made his WAFL league debut in 1954 for the East Perth Football Club, after some impressive performances with his school side Aquinas, coached by Mick Cronin. In 1956, in just his third season in the league, Crowd was part of the first open-era Royals premiership since 1936. Crowd transferred to Claremont in 1958.

He was married in 1961, and retired at the end of that season, before joining Harvey-Brunswick Football Club in the South West League for two seasons.
