= 2014 Foxtel Cup =

2014 premiership season
- Teams: 9
- Premiers: Williamstown

The 2014 Foxtel Cup was the fourth and final season of the Australian rules football knock-out competition involving clubs from the various state league competitions from around Australia.

The Cup's purpose is to support and promote the second-tier Australian rules football competitions and to provide another way of developing lower-tier Australian Football League (AFL) players.

The format of the competition was as follows:

- Nine teams competed.
- With the exception of the pre-qualifying round, matches were played on Tuesday nights as stand alone games and be broadcast by Fox Footy.
- The champions received $100,000 in prize money, and the runners-up received $40,000.

The top two sides from Western Australia (East Perth and West Perth) joined Norwood and reigning Foxtel Cup champion West Adelaide from South Australia, Box Hill Hawks and Williamstown from Victoria, and Tasmanian representative Western Storm, as participants in the 2014 Foxtel Cup. North East Australian Football League qualifiers, Aspley and Belconnen, competed against each other in Round 1 of the 2014 NEAFL competition as a pre-qualifying round, with Aspley winning through to play Williamstown in round 1 of the Foxtel Cup.

The selection of Western Storm, a club which was competing in the Tasmanian Football League for the first time in 2014, as Tasmania's representative was controversial, but came as a result of the defending Tasmanian Football League premiers, South Launceston, leaving the league. The majority of South Launceston's senior list shifted to Western Storm, so AFL Tasmania decided that the new club was a sufficiently close representation of the defending premiers to allow it to compete in the Foxtel Cup, rather than substituting the 2013 runners-up Burnie.

The competition began in March 2014 and concluded with Williamstown winning their second Foxtel Cup championship by defeating West Perth in the Grand Final at Simonds Stadium on 22 July 2014. The Coles medal for best on ground in the Grand Final was awarded to Williamstown's Ben Davies. The coach of Williamstown was Andrew Collins, former 200+ game triple premiership player with Hawthorn, who had coached West Adelaide to the Foxtel Cup championship the year previous.

== 2014 season ==
=== Participating clubs ===
NEAFL Eastern Conference (1)

- Belconnen

NEAFL Northern Conference (1)

- Aspley

SANFL (2)

- Norwood
- West Adelaide
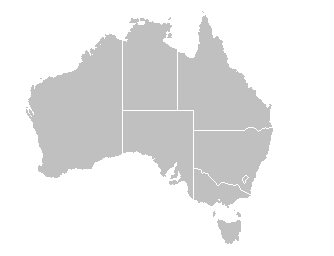

TFL (1)

- Western Storm

VFL (2)

- Box Hill
- Williamstown

WAFL (2)

- East Perth
- West Perth

=== Club details ===
| Guernsey | Club | Nickname | Location | Qualified as |
|---|---|---|---|---|
| | Aspley Australian Football Club | Hornets | Carseldine, Queensland | North East Australian Football League; Northern Conference runners-up 2013 |
| | Belconnen Football Club | Magpies | Belconnen, Australian Capital Territory | North East Australian Football League; Eastern Conference runners-up 2013 |
| | Box Hill Hawks Football Club | Hawks | Box Hill, Victoria | Victorian Football League premiers 2013 |
| | East Perth Football Club | Royals | Leederville, Western Australia | West Australian Football League runners-up 2013 |
| | Norwood Football Club | Redlegs | Norwood, South Australia | South Australian National Football League premiers 2013 |
| | West Adelaide Football Club | Bloods | Richmond, South Australia | South Australian National Football League; Reigning Foxtel Cup champions |
| | Western Storm Football Club | Storm | Prospect, Tasmania | Tasmanian State League representative |
| | West Perth Football Club | Falcons | Joondalup, Western Australia | West Australian Football League premiers 2013 |
| | Williamstown Football Club | Seagulls | Williamstown, Victoria | Victorian Football League; 3rd place 2013 |

== Stadiums ==
| Adelaide | Geelong | Melbourne |
|---|---|---|
| Adelaide Oval; Capacity: 50,000 | Simonds Stadium; Capacity: 33,500 | Etihad Stadium; Capacity: 56,347 |
| Melbourne | Perth | |
| Melbourne Cricket Ground; Capacity: 100,000 | Patersons Stadium; Capacity: 43,500 | |

== Fixture ==
The AFL released the fixture on 29 November 2013.
2014 Foxtel Cup Fixture

=== Bracket ===
First round
Aspley | 25 | 23 | 173
Belconnen | 2 | 5 | 17

Quarterfinals
West Adelaide | 8 | 9 | 57
Western Storm | 9 | 7 | 61
Box Hill | 7 | 9 | 51
West Perth | 7 | 11 | 53
Williamstown | 14 | 9 | 93
Aspley | 7 | 6 | 48
East Perth | 9 | 11 | 65
Norwood | 2 | 3 | 15

Semifinals
Western Storm | 3 | 5 | 23
West Perth | 15 | 7 | 97
Williamstown | 10 | 11 | 71
East Perth | 7 | 5 | 47

Finals
West Perth | 1 | 2 | 8
Williamstown | 10 | 11 | 71

=== Qualifying round ===
| Qualifier 29 March 2014; 12:00 EST | Aspley | 173–17 stand alone game | Belconnen | Graham Road, Aspley match report |
| | 7.3 (45); 9.9 (63); 20.14 (134); 25.23 (173) | match report | 0.1 (1); 2.2 (14); 2.2 (14); 2.5 (17) |
| | | Goals |
| | E.Sansbury 6, J.Stanley 3, C.Stiller 3, C.French 2, D.Smith 2, M.Pettitt 2, R.Copeland, M.Payne, M.Hutchinson, D.Bevan, A.Hughes, R.Matthews, J.Ives | | M.Porter, M. Sharp |
| | | Bests |
| | M.Payne, E.Sansbury, J.Stanley, R.Copeland, A.Lucy, J.Turner | | D.Hector, R.Turnbull, C.York, M.Sharp |

=== Round 1 ===
| Game #1 29 April 2014; 20:05 CST | West Adelaide | 57–61 stand alone game | Western Storm | Adelaide Oval match report match statistics |
| | 2.1 (13); 4.4 (28); 7.4 (46); 8.9 (57) | match report | 4.2 (26); 7.4 (46); 9.6 (60); 9.7 (61) |
| | | Goals |
| | Hopton 2, Watchman 2, Dijksman, Schott, De Zylva. | | Collis 2, McCulloch 2, Brown, Thomas, McGee, Russell, Barker. |
| | | Bests |
| | De Zylva, Jennings, Dijksman, Nelson. | | Hanson, Hills, Blackberry, Reinmuth, McCulloch. |

| Game #2 6 May 2014; 20:35 EST | Box Hill | 51–53 stand alone game | West Perth | Etihad Stadium, Melbourne match report match statistics |
| | 0.4 (4); 1.6 (12); 5.7 (37); 7.9 (51) | match report | 2.0 (12); 4.7 (31); 5.9 (39); 7.11 (53) |
| | | Goals |
| | Sicily 3, Ross 3, Willsmore | | Black, Brown, Adams, Tsalikis, Kerr, Bartholomew, Johnson |
| | | Bests |
| | Woodward, Kennedy, Ross, Isles, Sicily, Mirra | | Nelson, Jones, Manning, Crisp, Guadagnin, Morrow |

| Game #3 20 May 2014; 20:35 EST | Williamstown | 93–48 stand alone game | Aspley | Melbourne Cricket Ground match report match statistics |
| | 4.1 (25); 5.4 (34); 9.7 (61); 14.9 (93) | match report | 1.2 (8); 4.3 (27); 5.5 (35); 7.6 (48) |
| | | Goals |
| | A.Marcon 3, J.Owen 3, S.Clouston 2, D.Conway 2, J.Johnstone, M.Gibbons, S.Tighe, C.Nastasi | | A.Hughes 2, J.Nelis, J.Williams, R.Matthews, C.French, M.Payne. |
| | | Bests |
| | A.Marcon, S.Tighe, N.Sing, J.Johnstone, M.Gibbons. | | R.Matthews, M.Payne, J.Williams, R.Copeland, A.Lucy. |

| Game #4 27 May 2014; 18:35 WST | East Perth | 65–15 stand alone game | Norwood | Patersons Stadium, Perth match report match statistics |
| | 2.4 (16); 6.6 (42); 8.8 (56); 9.11 (65) | match report | 0.1 (1); 0.2 (2); 1.3 (9); 2.3 (15) |
| | | Goals |
| | S.Tunbridge 2, S.Lycett, B.Lee, W.Maginness, D.Main, J. Smith, B.Colledge, J.Oakley-Nicholls | | S.Phillips, M.Bower |
| | | Bests |
| | S.Lycett, S.Tunbridge, B.Colledge, F.Clutterbuck, B.Lee, S.Payne | | T.DeMatteis, K.Murphy, D.Auciello, S.Baldasso, T.Forster |

=== Semi-finals ===
| Semi Final #1 24 June 2014; 18:35 WST | Western Storm | 23–97 stand alone game | West Perth | Patersons Stadium, Perth match report match statistics |
| | 0.2 (2); 0.3 (3); 1.5 (11); 3.5 (23) | match report | 3.3 (21); 7.5 (47); 11.6 (72); 15.7 (97) |
| | | Goals |
| | A.Russell, W.Hanson, L.Barker | | M.McPhee 3, S.Martin 3, M.Johnson 2 M.Guadagnin, K.Shannon, M.Crisp, B.Antonio, R.Bartholomew, T.Manzone, S.Marusic |
| | | Bests |
| | J.Blackberry, M.Hanson, B.Thorp, T.Bardenhagen, J.Child | | A.Lynch, J.Thrum, L.Meadows, S.Martin, B.Antonio, S.Marusic |

| Semi Final #2 1 July 2014; 20:35 EST | Williamstown | 71–47 stand alone game | East Perth | Patersons Stadium, Perth match report match statistics |
| | 1.3 (9); 4.4 (28); 7.5 (47); 10.11 (71) | match report | 2.1 (13); 4.2 (26); 6.3 (39); 7.5 (47) |
| | | Goals |
| | J.Owen 2, S.Hetherington, A.Anastasio, J.Johnstone, J.Dorgan, S.Critchley, A.Woods, S.Wyatt, K.Lambert | | J.Hill 3, A.Carter, F.McInness, B.Colledge, B.Lee |
| | | Bests |
| | K.Lambert, J.Johnstone, M.Gibbons, J.Owen, S.Tighe, S.Critchley, A.Mangan | | S.Payne, P.Johnson, Colledge, B.Lee, J.Hill, J.Oakley-Nicholls |

=== Grand Final ===
| Grand Final 22 July 2014; 20:35 EST | West Perth | 8–71 stand alone game | Williamstown | Simonds Stadium, Geelong match report match statistics |
| | 0.2 (2); 0.2 (2); 0.2 (2); 1.2 (8) | match report | 5.4 (34); 5.9 (39); 7.11 (53); 10.11 (71) |
| | | Goals |
| | C.Chalmers | | C.Nastasi 2, S.Clouston 2, J.Johnstone 2, J.Owen, J.Dorgan, K.Lambert, S.Tighe |
| | | Bests |
| | A.Strijk, R.Kerr, L.Tedesco | | B.Davies, K.Lambert, S.Tighe, N.Sing, D.Fahey, J.McKenzie, S.Clouston |
