= Brian Dawson (coach) =

Australian rules footballer, coach, and academic

Dr Brian Dawson

Personal information
- Full name: Brian Terrence Dawson
- Born: 31 August 1958 (age 68)

Playing career
Years	Club	Games (Goals)
	Swan Districts	6 (?)
	Perth	7 (?)

Coaching career
Years	Club	Games (W–L–D)
2008–2010	Swan Districts	42–23–3
2013–2015	East Perth	14–9–0

Career highlights
- WAFL Premiership Coach: 2010

Brian Terrence Dawson (born 31 August 1958) is an Australian rules football coach and academic. He is coach of East Perth in the West Australian Football League (WAFL) and is a Winthrop Professor at the University of Western Australia (UWA).

== Playing career ==
Dawson joined Swan Districts in 1975, initially playing in the colts team. In 1977 he played the first of six league matches for Swan Districts, later playing seven league matches for Perth. He also played a total of eight seasons and 134 matches with Osborne Park in the Sunday Football League.

== Coaching career ==
Between 1988 and 2000 Dawson was fitness coach for the West Coast Eagles. He was made a life member by the club in 2007.

Dawson was head coach of Swan Districts between 2008 and 2010, winning the West Australian Football League (WAFL) premiership in 2010. He resigned as Swans coach after the end of the 2010 WAFL season when work commitments in Japan prevented him from committing to full-time coaching in 2011.

In October 2012 he replaced Tony Micale as coach of East Perth.

At the conclusion of the 2014 WAFL season, Dawson received the JJ Leonard Medal as the Coach of the Year, after guiding the Royals to a second straight grand final, and his fourth in five seasons as a league coach.

== Academic life ==
In 1981 Dawson completed a master's degree in physical education studying the effects of heat stress on athletes. He completed a Doctor of Philosophy degree (PhD) on athletes' heat tolerance.

Dawson is director of community and public programs at the University of Western Australia (UWA) and holds the title of Winthrop Professor.

In 2004 Dawson wrote a biography of John Todd, titled John Todd: Six decades of Footy. He has written numerous articles and books on training and recovery techniques for sportspeople.

Dawson is the chair of the science and football steering group of the World Commission of Science and Sports.
