= Brad Smith (footballer, born 1948) =

Australian rules footballer

Personal information
- Full name: Bradley Rickard Smith
- Born: 3 December 1948 (age 77)
- Height: 193 cm (6 ft 4 in)
- Weight: 96 kg (212 lb)
- Position: Defender/On-baller

Playing career^{1}
Years	Club	Games (Goals)
1966–1973, 1976–1978	East Perth	222 (69)
1974–1975	North Melbourne	24 (12)
1979–1980	East Fremantle	6 (6)
Total		252 (87)

Coaching career
Years	Club	Games (W–L–D)
1979–80	East Fremantle	45 (21)
- ^{1} Playing statistics correct to the end of 1980.

Career highlights
- East Fremantle 1979 Premiership coach East Perth Team of the Century (Post-war); East Perth 1972, 1978 Premiership player North Melbourne 1974 Grand Final player

Brad R. Smith (born 3 December 1948) is a former Australian rules footballer who played with North Melbourne in the Victorian Football League (VFL) during the 1970s. He also had a long career in the West Australian National Football League (WANFL) where he played for East Perth and coached East Fremantle.

Smith was a late comer to VFL football as he had spent eight years at East Perth before joining North Melbourne. He was a member of East Perth's 1972 and 1978 premiership teams and a back pocket player in the North Melbourne side which lost the 1974 VFL Grand Final.

His stint in Victoria lasted just two seasons and in 1976 he returned to East Perth and ended up with 222 WANFL games. During this time he also represented Western Australia in six interstate matches. Smith was appointed coach of East Fremantle in 1979 and promptly steered them to the premiership. Although he was recruited as a non-playing coach to East Fremantle, he also took the field for two games in 1979 and three games in 1980, thus finishing with 227 WANFL/WAFL games in his career. Despite a successful first year as coach, the 1980 season was a struggle and East Fremantle only narrowly avoided the wooden spoon. In response to their poor season, East Fremantle decided to appoint a full-time coach for the 1981 season (all previous coaching appointments were part-time) and Smith left to join East Perth as an assistant coach under Grant Dorrington. As the reigning premiership coach, Smith coached the WA state side in four matches in 1980, including the 1980 Australian Football Carnival, held in Adelaide in October.

In 2006 Smith was named on the interchange bench in East Perth's official 'Post-war Team of the Century' (1945 to 2005).
