= Kevin Worthington =

Australian rules footballer

Personal information
- Full name: Kevin James Worthington
- Born: 25 May 1953 (age 73)
- Height: 189 cm (6 ft 2 in)
- Weight: 88 kg (194 lb)
- Position: Defender

Playing career^{1}
Years	Club	Games (Goals)
1971–76, 1980	Claremont	102 (57)
1977–79, 1981–82	Collingwood	95 (19)
1983–84	Perth	27 (2)
Total		224 (78)

Coaching career
Years	Club	Games (W–L–D)
1996–1999	East Perth	85 (43–41–1)
- ^{1} Playing statistics correct to the end of 1984.

Kevin James Worthington (born 25 May 1953) is a former Australian rules footballer who was a prominent player at Claremont in the WAFL and Collingwood in the VFL, during the late 1970s and early 1980s.

Worthington played for Claremont between 1971 and 1976. At Collingwood for the following three seasons, he was used by coach Tom Hafey as a fullback or back pocket, and participated in losing 1977 and 1979 Grand Final teams. A series of knee injuries led to Worthington spending the 1980 season at Claremont, where he again performed well.

He returned to Collingwood for 1981 and 1982, after which he transferred back to the WAFL, this time at Perth. Worthington spent 1983 and 1984 there, to finish with 129 games in the league.

He also played four interstate games for Western Australia over the course of his career, including the inaugural State of Origin encounter against Victoria.

After retiring as a player, Worthington had a long association with his Magpie teammate Stan Magro at country club Wagin and then in 1992 and 1993 as Magro's assistant at East Perth, who had fallen upon hard times since the middle 1980s as their suburban recruiting base was affected by demographic shifts. In his first season as Magro's assistant, Worthington unexpectedly took the Royals as far as a preliminary final, but the following season they fell to seventh in a competition so even that the Royals were only three and a half wins from the top. After two unsuccessful years under little-known former South Fremantle player Robert Solin, Worthington took the reins at East Perth and steered them as far as their first grand final in nineteen seasons. However, the following three years were progressively less successful and at the end of a 1999 season that saw the Royals ahead only of a winless Peel Thunder, he was unceremoniously sacked to be replaced by Tony Micale.

He is the uncle of Australian basketball player Mark Worthington.
