= Ian McCulloch =

Ian McCulloch may refer to:

- Ian McCulloch (actor) (born 1939), British actor
- Ian McCulloch (singer) (born 1959), English singer, notably of Echo and the Bunnymen
- Ian McCulloch (snooker player) (born 1971), English snooker player
- Ian McCulloch (footballer) (born 1948), Australian rules football player for Fitzroy and East Perth

== See also ==
- Iain McCulloch (born 1954), Scottish footballer (Kilmarnock and Notts County)
- Iain McCulloch (academic), professor of polymer materials
