= Frank Allen (Australian footballer) =

Australian rules footballer (1926–2018)

Personal information
- Full name: Frank William Allen
- Born: 5 December 1926; Perth, Western Australia
- Died: 4 February 2018 (aged 91)
- Original team: North Perth (Temperance)
- Height: 178 cm (5 ft 10 in)
- Weight: 74 kg (163 lb)
- Positions: Centre, half-forward flank

Playing career^{1}
Years	Club	Games (Goals)
1943–56	East Perth	190 (30)

Representative team honours
Years	Team	Games (Goals)
1950–56	Western Australia	11 (3)
- ^{1} Playing statistics correct to the end of 1956.

Career highlights
- East Perth premiership side 1944; East Perth best and fairest 1950; Sandover Medal 1950; 3rd Sandover Medal 1951; East Perth life member

Frank William Allen (5 December 1926 – 4 February 2018) was an Australian rules footballer who played for the East Perth Football Club in the Western Australian National Football League (WANFL). He tied with Jim Conway for the 1950 Sandover Medal.

== Career ==
Allen was born at Nurse Harvey's Hospital in Perth, Western Australia, across the road from Perth Oval, the East Perth Football Club's home ground. Allen grew up in the Inglewood area, where he attended primary school with future East Perth captain Frank Sparrow. Originally playing for the North Perth team in the Temperance League, Allen made his debut for East Perth in 1943 during the war-time under-age competition. The following year, he played in a premiership, did not play the following two seasons due to military service with the Royal Australian Navy. Allen resumed playing in 1946. A centreman who occasionally played on the half-forward flank, Allen played 190 games for East Perth between 1943 and 1956, and also represented Western Australia on 11 occasions, including the 1950 and 1956 Australian Football Carnivals. After winning the F. D. Book Medal in 1950 as East Perth's best and fairest player, Allen tied with East Fremantle's Jim Conway in the Sandover Medal. Conway was awarded the medal on countback, but in 1997, the WAFL awarded Allen another medal retrospectively. He retired in 1956 due to a knee injury, missing out on East Perth's premiership. Allen later coached the Sunday Football League club Hellenics, having previously coached the East Perth seconds in 1954. Outside of football, he worked as an accountant.

In 2016, he was awarded the Game Ball Legend title by the East Perth Football Club. He died in February 2018 from cancer.
