= Josh Smith (footballer, born 1986) =

Australian rules footballer (born 1986)

Personal information
- Full name: Joshua Smith
- Born: 5 March 1986 (age 40)
- Original team: West Perth (WAFL)
- Height: 195 cm (6 ft 5 in)
- Weight: 105 kg (231 lb)
- Position: Forward

Playing career^{1}
Years	Club	Games (Goals)
2007	West Perth	20 (24)
2008–2010	North Melbourne	11 (2)
2011–2014	East Perth	78 (213)
- ^{1} Playing statistics correct to the end of 2014.

Career highlights
- East Perth leading goal kicker 2011-2014; East Perth best and fairest runner-up 2011; Simpson Medal (State) 2011; Bernie Naylor Medal 2013; VFL premiership player: 2008, 2009, 2010; Norm Goss Memorial Medal: 2008

Joshua Smith (born 5 March 1986) is an Australian rules footballer who played for North Melbourne in the AFL between 2008 and 2010.

Recruited from West Perth in the West Australian Football League (WAFL) with the 62nd selection in the 2007 AFL draft, Smith made his AFL debut in Round 7 of the 2008 AFL season but only played one more AFL game for the year. He struggled to break into the North Melbourne side over the next two years, only playing five games in 2009 and four in 2010 before he was delisted at the end of the 2010 season. When not playing for North Melbourne, he played for North Ballarat in the Victorian Football League and was a member of their 2008, 2009 and 2010 premiership sides. He was awarded the Norm Goss Medal for being the best player in the 2008 final when he kicked five goals.

In 2011 he returned to Western Australia, but switched to play for East Perth in the WAFL. He was selected to represent WA against Queensland and was awarded the Simpson Medal for the best player from Western Australia in the game.
