= Herbie Screaigh =

Australian rules footballer

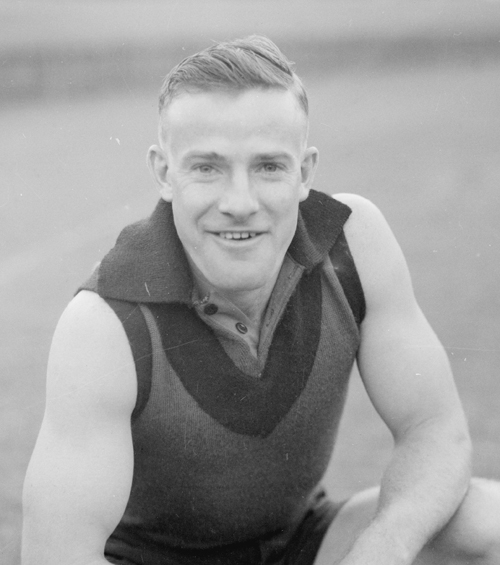

Personal information
- Full name: Wyborn Herbert George Screaigh
- Born: 12 May 1911; York, Western Australia
- Died: 7 July 2002 (aged 91); Nedlands, Western Australia
- Original team: Central Football Club (YDFA)
- Height: 165 cm (5 ft 5 in)
- Weight: 61 kg (134 lb)
- Positions: Rover, forward pocket

Playing career^{1}
Years	Club	Games (Goals)
1932–46	East Perth	206 (359)

Representative team honours
Years	Team	Games (Goals)
1933–39	Western Australia	7 (13)
- ^{1} Playing statistics correct to the end of 1946.

Career highlights
- Selby Medal 1931; East Perth best and fairest 1932, 1933, 1934, 1937; Second Sandover Medal 1933; East Perth leading goalkicker 1934, 1935, 1938; East Perth premiership side 1936; East Perth captain 1941; East Perth Team of the Century (pre-WW2); East Perth Hall of Fame (inducted 2011); West Australian Football Hall of Fame (inducted 2012)

Wyborn Herbert George "Herbie" Screaigh (/skriːtʃ/; 12 May 1911 – 7 July 2002) was an Australian rules footballer who played for the East Perth Football Club in the Western Australian National Football League (WANFL).

Originally from York, Western Australia, where he played in the local league, Screaigh made his debut for East Perth in 1932, and went on to win three club best-and-fairest awards in his first three seasons. Playing mainly as a rover, Screaigh was a member of East Perth's 1936 premiership side, and also led the club's goalkicking in three seasons. He captained the club in 1941, but enlisted in the Australian Army the following year. Screaigh returned to football in 1945, playing two final seasons before retiring. He had also represented Western Australia in seven interstate matches between 1933 and 1939. Screaigh was posthumously inducted into the West Australian Football Hall of Fame in 2012.

== Football career ==
Born on 12 May 1911, in York, Western Australia, Screaigh was one of twelve children (nine of whom survived infancy) born to Edward Screaigh (1878–1959) and Maud Weatherall (1879–1974). On his father's side he was of English and Irish descent, with his father's maternal grandfather, James Hayden, born in Dublin in 1809. Screaigh originally played for the Central Football Club in the York District Football Association (YDFA). He first attracted the attention of East Fremantle recruiters at the end of the 1930 season, but declined their invitation after no job could be found for him in Perth. He again drew the interest of recruiters the following year after winning the Selby Medal for the best player in the YDFA, and was recruited by East Perth for the 1932 season. He had an immediate impact, winning the club's best and fairest in his first season. He also played in the losing grand final side against West Perth.

Screaigh again won the club best and fairest in 1933, and was selected as the rover in a WANFL representative side at the 1933 Sydney Carnival, at the time being considered "the leading rover in the league". He kicked six goals in four games to be considered one of the side's best players. He also finished runner-up by one vote in the Sandover Medal to Claremont-Cottesloe's Sammy Clarke. He again represented the WANFL at interstate level in 1934, playing two games against the SANFL, kicking three goals. He won his third consecutive best and fairest award, and was also East Perth's leading goalkicker, in part due to the absence of a key marking forward. This was repeated in 1935.

Screaigh was a key member of East Perth's successive 1936 finals competition which culminated in a grand final victory. Despite being considered strong underdogs, East Perth defeated Subiaco in the first semi-final 6.11 (47) to 5.16 (46), winning through to a preliminary final against East Fremantle. In front of a crowd of 10,079 at Subiaco Oval, East Fremantle led by 13 points with four minutes remaining. East Perth managed to kick 2.2 in the final minutes to win 14.14 (98) to 14.13 (97), with Screaigh kicking 1.2, including the winning goal, crumbed from a pack with three seconds remaining. The club subsequently won the grand final against Claremont 11.5 (71) to 9.6 (60), with Screaigh again kicking a goal with the last kick after the match After the retirement of previous captain Mick Cronin due to a leg injury before the 1940 season, Screaigh was appointed captain of the club for the 1940 season, with Cronin remaining in a role as non-playing coach. Cronin returned to the game in 1941 and was re-appointed captain, with Screaigh returning to the role of vice-captain.

Screaigh enlisted in the 2/11th Battalion of the Australian Imperial Force (AIF) as a private in 1942. He served on home duty and in New Guinea during the war. Screaigh captained the battalion's football team in the 6th Division's football league hosted in North Queensland, and was also captain of a combined AIF team in 1944. He was discharged from the army in 1945 after the 2/11th was disbanded, and returned to East Perth for the 1946 season, playing his 200th game on 13 July 1946, against Claremont. The Daily News reported Screaigh had "maintained much of his skill of former years". He retired at the end of the 1946 season.

== Later life ==
Screaigh had married Jean Augustine Marwick on 3 December 1932 at St Patricks Catholic Church in York, with whom he had two daughters, Maureen (later Otto) and Deanne (later Hetherington). Outside of football, he worked as a fitter's assistant and storeman at the East Perth Power Station. As well as winning the F. D. Book Medal four times as East Perth's fairest and best player (in 1932, 1933, 1934, and 1937), Screaigh also won trophies for "serviceable play" in 1936 and as the "most determined player" in 1942. He was made a life member of the club in 1958. Screaigh died in 2002 in Nedlands, and was buried at York Cemetery. In 2006, he was selected as the 19th man in East Perth's pre-World War II Team of the Century, and in 2011 was posthumously inducted into the East Perth Hall of Fame. In March 2012, Screaigh was inducted into the West Australian Football Hall of Fame.

== Playing style ==
One of the most admirable features of Screaigh's play, and one which is not usually found in small men, in his straight-ahead style. He does not waste time and ground by long, sweeping turns or dodging backwards and forwards. If in trouble he turns like an eel, swiftly and sharply, and does not waste time in getting rid of the ball. When going through with the ball and confronted by an opponent, he drops the ball and at the same time throws up his head, almost invariably causing his opponent to give away a free-kick for holding him round the neck.

— The West Australian, 18 July 1933

Screaigh was one of the smallest players in the WANFL at the time, standing only 165 centimetres (5 ft 5 in) and weighing 61 kilograms (134 lb). He had only been recruited to East Perth after convincing the club secretary, F. D. Book, who had on appearances thought Screaigh was "too small and meek", to allow him to play in several scratch matches before the 1932 season. Screaigh was adept at twisting out of tackles, and talented at drawing free kicks for head-high contact by dropping his head during tackles: Even with his small stature, Screaigh played well in packs and scrimmages, and used a "safe pair of hands" and a "driving boot" to his best advantage. Despite playing as a rover, Screaigh kicked a large number of goals, averaging 1.75 goals per game throughout his career. Against Subiaco in July 1933, he kicked nine goals, at the time the second-highest goal-kicking total of a player playing as a rover in the league.
