= Derek Chadwick =

Australian sportsman (1941–2025)

Personal information
- Full name: Derek Chadwick
- Born: 21 March 1941; Busselton, Western Australia, Australia
- Died: 22 October 2025 (aged 84)

Playing career
Years	Club	Games (Goals)
1959–1972	East Perth	269 (63)

Derek Chadwick (21 March 1941 – 22 October 2025) was an Australian sportsman, playing both first-class cricket with Western Australia and Australian rules football for East Perth in the Western Australian Football League (WAFL).

Chadwick was a right-handed opening batsman who made 4082 runs at 34.30 during his first-class cricket career, with 9 centuries. He toured New Zealand with the Australian team in 1969-70. As a footballer he was a wingman and played an at-the-time club record 269 games for East Perth, winning their best and fairest award, the F.D. Book Medal twice. In 1964 he won a Simpson Medal for his performances with the Western Australian state team in tours of Melbourne and Adelaide, and was inducted into the WAFL Hall of Fame in 2004. Chadwick died on 22 October 2025 at the age of 84.
