= Bert Harrold =

Australian rules footballer

Personal information
- Full name: Hubert Walton Harrold
- Born: 9 March 1898; East Perth, Western Australia
- Died: 14 April 1968 (aged 70); Hollywood, Perth, Western Australia

Playing career^{1}
Years	Club	Games (Goals)
1916–25, 1932	East Perth	96 (115)
- ^{1} Playing statistics correct to the end of 1932.

Hubert Walton Harrold (9 March 1898 – 14 April 1968), known as Bert Harold, was an Australian rules footballer who played with East Perth in the West Australian Football League (WAFL). He also played one first-class match for Western Australia.

== Football ==
Harrold, a member of four East Perth premiership teams, was a half-forward flanker in the club's 1920, 1921 and 1922 grand final wins. He was a wingman in the 1923 premiership side, captained by his brother Vern. A Western Australian interstate representative, he made four appearances in the 1924 Hobart Carnival. He played for his state on one further occasion and kicked eight goals in total from his five matches. When a "Team of the Century" was named in 2006, based on the period 1906 to 1944, Harrold was named on a half forward flank.

== Cricket ==
He was also a good enough cricketer to represent Western Australia in a first-class fixture during the 1925/26 cricket season, against a Herbie Collins-led Australian XI at the WACA. He was the last person to bat in the first innings but contributed an unbeaten 21. A right-arm fast bowler, he then took 2/89 from 21 overs with the ball, taking the wickets of both openers, the Australian XI captain and Jack Ryder. When Harrold batted the second time, Ryder trapped him leg before wicket without scoring, to give his side victory by an innings and 45 runs.
