= Phil Tierney =

Australian rules footballer

Personal information
- Full name: Phillip Ambrose Tierney
- Born: 15 March 1942 (age 84)
- Position: Full-forward

Playing career^{1}
Years	Club	Games (Goals)
1962–69, 1971–72	East Perth	190 (620)
1970	West Torrens	16 (65)
- ^{1} Playing statistics correct to the end of 1970.

Phillip Ambrose Tierney (born 15 March 1942) is a former Australian rules footballer who played with East Perth in the West Australian National Football League (WANFL) during the 1960s.

Tierney was a prolific full-forward, kicking over 100 goals in a season on three occasions and topping East Perth's goal-kicking five times. Due to his career coinciding with that of Austin Robertson, Jr., Tierney won the Bernie Naylor Medal as the league's top goal scorer just once, with 119 goals in 1967. He also kicked 106 goals in 1968 and 105 majors in 1971. Tierney was a member of his only premiership team in 1972 and retired after the Grand Final. He played as a half forward flanker in the premiership decider against Claremont but was kept goalless.

In 1970 he joined West Torrens in South Australia for a season and was their best forward that year, kicking 65 goals.

At the 1972 Perth Carnival, Tierney represented Western Australia for the first time and kicked 11 goals from his three games.

Tierney was, in 2006, named at full-forward in East Perth's official 'Team of the Century' which took into account the era from 1945 to 2005.
