= Greg Brehaut =

Australian rules footballer and coach

Personal information
- Full name: Gregory John Brehaut
- Born: 1 August 1946; Carlisle, Western Australia
- Died: 19 February 1993 (aged 46); Carine, Western Australia
- Position: Wing

Playing career
Years	Club	Games (Goals)
1965–75	Perth	157 (46)
1974	Woodville	10 (1)
Total		167 (47)

Representative team honours
Years	Team	Games (Goals)
1966–72	Western Australia	16 (5)

Coaching career
Years	Club	Games (W–L–D)
1974	Woodville	22 (6–15–1)
1983–86	East Perth	85 (32–53–0)

Career highlights
- Perth premiership side 1966, 1967, 1968; All-Australian team 1969; West Australian Football Hall of Fame 2006

Gregory John Brehaut (1 August 1946 – 19 February 1993) was an Australian rules football player and coach who played with Perth in the Western Australian National Football League (WANFL) and briefly with Woodville in the South Australian National Football League (SANFL). Playing mainly as a wingman, he also represented Western Australia in 16 interstate matches, and later coached the East Perth Football Club between 1983 and 1986, before dying in 1993 at the age of 46 from a heart attack. Brehaut was posthumously inducted into the West Australian Football Hall of Fame in 2006.

== Football career ==
Born in Carlisle, Western Australia, Brehaut played with local junior teams before making his senior debut for Perth in 1965, subsequently winning consecutive premierships with the club in 1966, 1967, and 1968. He represented Western Australia several times, and was named in the All-Australian team after the 1969 Australian National Football Carnival, held in Adelaide. Brehaut was named captain-coach of Woodville in the SANFL for the 1974 season, but only managed to play 10 games due to injury, with Woodville finishing ninth in a ten-team competition. He returned to Perth in 1975, and retired at the end of that season, finishing his career with 157 games for the club.

After captain-coaching amateur side Wanneroo to four consecutive premierships in the West Australian Football Association (WAFA), Brehaut was appointed coach of East Perth in 1983 and held the position until 1986; however, this was during a period when the club, which in terms of winning percent had been the most successful in the WANFL since 1956, was finding its traditional recruiting base becoming less productive and they played in the finals only once. After seven round in which the Royals had surrendered several large leads, the club board sacked him arguing that he was schooling the club in how to lose matches; however, the crisis, with the Royals' seconds having won five games out of seven, also claimed seconds coach Ian McCulloch, training co-ordinator Bruce Sinclair and reserves manager Gary Gillespie.

Brehaut's appointment had been influenced by the appointment of Mal Atwell, coach for much of his senior career, to the position of club president. Brehaut died in February 1993, after suffering heart attack while jogging on a beach. He was named in Perth's Team of the Century in 1999, and posthumously inducted into the West Australian Football Hall of Fame in 2006.
