= Seff Parry =

Australian rules footballer (1907–1980)

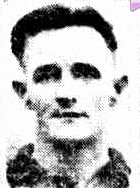

Personal information
- Full name: Arnold Sefton Parry
- Born: 17 August 1907; Adelaide, South Australia
- Died: 29 July 1980 (aged 72); Perth, Western Australia
- Original team: Henley and Grange (SAAFL)
- Height: 170 cm (5 ft 7 in)
- Weight: 67 kg (148 lb)
- Position: Rover

Playing career^{1}
Years	Club	Games (Goals)
1929–1932, 1934	West Adelaide (SANFL)	
1933	Fitzroy (VFL)	5 (3)
1935–1938, 1949	East Perth (WANFL)	56 (98)
1945	Subiaco (WANFL)	1 (0)

Coaching career
Years	Club	Games (W–L–D)
1945, 1947	Subiaco	
1949	East Perth	18 (9)
- ^{1} Playing statistics correct to the end of 1949.

Career highlights
- East Perth leading goalkicker 1935; East Perth premiership 1936

Arnold Sefton "Seff" Parry (17 August 1907 – 29 July 1980) was an Australian rules footballer who played with West Adelaide in the South Australian National Football League (SANFL), Fitzroy in the Victorian Football League (VFL) and East Perth in the Western Australian National Football League (WANFL). He coached both Subiaco and East Perth.

== Playing career ==
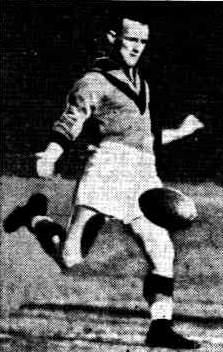

Born in Adelaide, Parry started his career in the South Australian Amateur Football League (SAAFL), with Henley and Grange. He began playing for West Adelaide in 1929 and remained with the club until 1932.

Parry, a rover, was cleared to Fitzroy just before the beginning of the 1933 VFL season and made his league debut in the opening round, against North Melbourne at Arden Street. He made four further appearances that season, the last in round 11.

He returned to West Adelaide in 1934 and that year became the second member of his family to be an interstate representative, when he represented South Australia in Perth. His brother Cyril was also a South Australian representative, but in cricket. The brothers both played district cricket for West Torrens.

From 1935 to 1938, Parry played for East Perth. Parry was believed to have been the first player from the eastern states in over 20 years to appear for the club and also had the distinction of having played in all three major football leagues in successive seasons. He was East Perth's joint leading goal-kicker in 1935 and a member of the team that defeated Claremont to win the 1936 premiership.

== Coaching ==
Parry was appointed coach of Subiaco in 1945. Although retired, he made one appearance as a player that season. He was replaced by Frank Murphy the following year but returned as coach in 1947, when Murphy didn't reapply for the role.

He coached East Perth in 1949, to fifth position, which wasn't enough to keep the job in 1950. Late in the season, due to an injury crisis, Parry was again called out of retirement to take the field.
