= Phil Kelly (Australian footballer) =

Australian rules footballer

Personal information
- Full name: Phillip Vincent Kelly
- Born: 26 August 1957 (age 69)
- Original team: Busselton, Western Australia
- Height: 184 cm (6 ft 0 in)
- Weight: 84 kg (185 lb)

Playing career^{1}
Years	Club	Games (Goals)
1975–1980	East Perth	109 (73)
1981–1985	North Melbourne	61 (42)
Total		170 (115)
- ^{1} Playing statistics correct to the end of 1985.

Phillip Vincent Kelly (born 26 August 1957) is a former Australian rules footballer who played for East Perth in the West Australian National Football League and North Melbourne in the Victorian Football League. He represented Western Australia at interstate football on six occasions.

Kelly played mostly as a wingman but was also used as times on the ball. He started his career in 1975 at East Perth. He won Sandover Medals in both 1978 and 1979 to become the second East Perth player, after Graham Farmer, to have won the award in successive years. In 1978, he was a member of East Perth's premiership side.

Kelly transferred to North Melbourne in 1981 and remained with them for five seasons.

His son, Josh Kelly, was picked in the 2013 AFL draft with the second selection by the Greater Western Sydney Giants.
