= Paul Peos =

Australian rules footballer and coach

Personal information
- Full name: Paul John Peos
- Born: 28 January 1968 (age 58)
- Original team: East Perth (WAFL)
- Debut: Round 1, 19 March 1987, West Coast vs. Richmond, at Subiaco Oval

Playing career^{1}
| Years | Club | Games (Goals) |
| 1987–1992 | West Coast | 51 (28) |
| 1993–1994 | Brisbane Bears | 33 (40) |
| 1995 | West Coast | 4 (6) |
| Total | | 88 (74) |
- ^{1} Playing statistics correct to the end of 1995.

Career highlights
- Inaugural West Coast Eagles squad member; East Perth Football Club's best and fairest 1996; QAFL Premiership side with Morningside 1993; 50th AFL game v Sydney Swans 12 July 1992

Paul John Peos (born 28 January 1968) is a former Australian rules footballer who played for the West Coast Eagles and Brisbane Bears in the Australian Football League (AFL), and East Perth in the West Australian Football League (WAFL). Peos is of Macedonian descent and speaks Macedonian fluently. He holds an Economics degree from the University of Western Australia.

Peos was a leading schoolboy player, and was part of the inaugural West Coast squad in 1987. He lined up in West Coast's first ever AFL game against Richmond on 29 March 1987, and had the first kick for his team, in a match won by West Coast 20.13 (133) to 16.23 (119). He played 11 games that season, and another 11 in 1988. Peos played his 50th game for West Coast against the Sydney Swans in 1992. After playing 29 games in four seasons from 1989 to 1992, he was traded to the Brisbane Bears for draft pick number 21.

Peos played 33 games in two seasons for Brisbane, kicking 40 goals, before returning to Western Australia to play for East Perth. He nominated for the AFL pre-season draft in 1995, and was picked up by his former club the West Coast Eagles, and played four games that year, finishing his AFL career with 88 games and 64 goals. Peos continued playing for East Perth, and played a total of 121 games and scoring 59 goals. He became the stand-in East Perth coach in the latter part of 2006, nurturing talent such as Matthew Leuenberger. In 2007, he also took up a position as head of football coaching at Hale School.
