= Bob Burns (footballer) =

Australian rules footballer

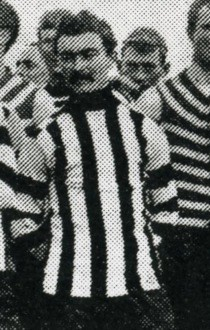
- Burns in 1904

Personal information
- Full name: Robert Edward James Burns
- Born: 3 June 1884; Collingwood, Victoria
- Died: 16 August 1949 (aged 65); Abertillery, Wales
- Original team: Richmond (VFA)
- Height: 175 cm (5 ft 9 in)
- Weight: 78 kg (172 lb)

Playing career^{1}
Years	Club	Games (Goals)
1904	Collingwood	2 (0)
1906	Perth	10
- ^{1} Playing statistics correct to the end of 1904.

Robert Edward James Burns (3 June 1884 – 16 August 1949) was an Australian rules footballer who played with Collingwood in the Victorian Football League (VFL).

After playing two games for Collingwood in 1904, Burns moved to Perth to teach at the Christian Brothers College and played in Western Australia for Perth and East Perth. He also coached the latter.

Burns then left the country to study medicine at the University of Edinburgh, before moving again to become a doctor in Abertillery in Monmouthshire, Wales.
