= Billy Thomas (Australian footballer) =

Australian rules footballer, coach, and administrator

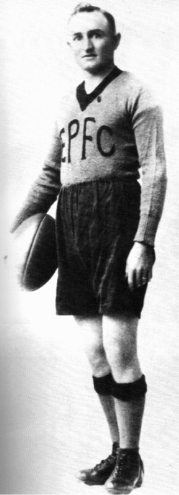

Personal information
- Full name: William Charles Gordon Thomas
- Born: 20 February 1903; North Fremantle, Western Australia
- Died: 27 April 1968 (aged 65); South Perth, Western Australia
- Original team: Railways (GFA)
- Height: 168 cm (66 in)
- Weight: 65 kg (143 lb)
- Position: Rover

Playing career^{1}
| Years | Club | Games (Goals) |
| 1925–26 | Kalgoorlie City | unknown |
| 1927–36 | East Perth | 114 (169) |

Representative team honours
| Years | Team | Games (Goals) |
| 1929–30 | Western Australia | 9 (10) |

Coaching career^{3}
| Years | Club | Games (W–L–D) |
| 1942 | East Perth | 18 (10–8–0) |
- ^{1} Playing statistics correct to the end of 1936.^{3} Coaching statistics correct as of 1942.

Career highlights
- East Perth best and fairest 1928, 1929; Sandover Medal 1929; East Perth leading goalkicker 1931; East Perth Team of Century (pre-WW2)

William Charles Gordon Thomas (20 February 1903 – 27 April 1968) was an Australian rules football player, coach, and administrator who was involved with the East Perth Football Club in the Western Australian National Football League (WANFL) in a number of roles from the 1920s to the 1950s. Thomas played 114 games for the club from 1927 to 1936, having previously played for the Kalgoorlie City Football Club in the Goldfields National Football League (GNFL). He won best and fairest awards with East Perth in 1928 and 1929, also winning the Sandover Medal in the latter season. After his retirement, Thomas served as club secretary (1932 to 1941) and club president (1951 to 1955), as well as coaching the club in 1942, when the competition was age-restricted due to the Second World War.

== Career ==
Thomas was born in North Fremantle, Western Australia, on 20 February 1902, the son of Jack Thomas, a former captain of the Fremantle Football Club and secretary of the North Fremantle Football Club. He moved to Geraldton with his family at the age of six, and played football for local teams from an early age, captaining his school team at the age of 16. Thomas subsequently captained the junior team of the Railways Football Club in the Geraldton Football Association (GFA), also playing seasons with teams from Moora and Mullewa. In 1922, he made his debut for Railways' senior team, captaining the side in 1924 before being transferred to Coolgardie due to his work as a telegraphist. He played one-and-a-half seasons of football with Kalgoorlie City in the Goldfields Football League (GFL) before again being transferred, this time to the General Post Office in the Perth central business district. Thomas was cleared to East Perth for the 1927 season, making his debut in round three. Thomas won the Guthrie Gold Medal in 1928 as East Perth's best and fairest player, winning a second award the following season to become the first player to win the award in consecutive years. In the latter season, Thomas also won the Sandover Medal. Thomas served as coach of East Perth in 1942 when the WAFL was age-restricted to players under the age of 18. He also served as club secretary from 1932 to 1941 and club president from 1951 to 1955.

During the 1938 season, Thomas was one of several ex-players, including Keith Hough, who volunteered to serve as umpires for one round (the regular umpires having withdrawn their services over a pay dispute). The Daily News noted that Thomas showed "outstanding ability", praising his "faultless display". Having moved to the South Perth district after his retirement from playing, Thomas was also involved in local government during the late 1940s and early 1950s, serving on the South Perth Road Board and at one stage as president of the South Perth Community Centre Association. He also served as patron of the South Perth Football Club in the Metropolitan Junior Football Association (MJFA). In 2005, Thomas was named as the forward pocket in East Perth's pre-World War II "Team of the Century".
