= Mick Cronin (footballer) =

Australian rules footballer, born 1911

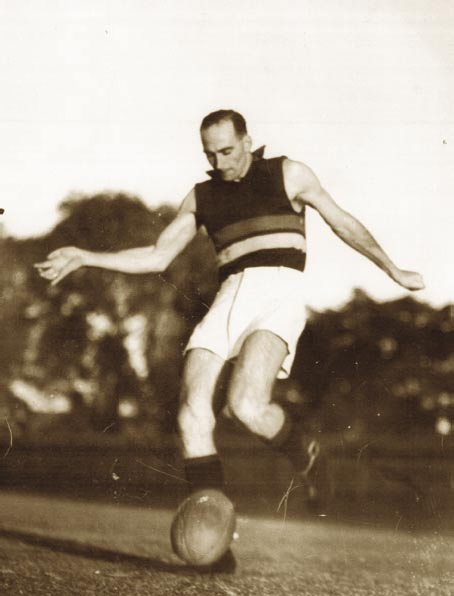

Personal information
- Full name: Deverick John Cronin
- Born: 18 March 1911; Wagin, Western Australia
- Died: 1 September 1979 (aged 68); Perth, Western Australia
- Position: Centre

Playing career^{1}
Years	Club	Games (Goals)
1931–1941	East Perth	164 (121)

Representative team honours
Years	Team	Games (Goals)
1933–1938	Western Australia	12 (9)

Coaching career
Years	Club	Games (W–L–D)
1939, 1941, 1951–55	East Perth	
1951	Western Australia	1 (0–1–0)
- ^{1} Playing statistics correct to the end of 1941.

Career highlights
- East Perth best and fairest: 1931; East Perth premiership captain: 1936; East Perth captain 1936–1950; Tassie Medal inaugural winner: 1937; Umpired 1947 WANFL Grand Final; Umpired 1947 Hobart Carnival

Deverick John "Mick" Cronin (18 March 1911 – 1 September 1979) was an Australian rules football player, umpire and television commentator in Western Australia.

== Playing career ==
He played 164 games for East Perth from 1930 to 1941 winning the club's fairest and best award in 1931.

In 1936 Cronin was made Captain – a role he would hold until the end of the 1940 season.

A dynamic performer, Cronin was just as much at home on the half forward line as in the centre, and it was in the position of half forward flanker that he represented the Royals in their winning grand final game in 1936.

Cronin earned his first Western Australia cap against South Australia in 1933 after being selected as part of the squad for the Sydney Carnival and went on to play 12 games for his state.

He was then at the peak of his form during the 1937 interstate football carnival in Perth when he put in two near best on ground performances in helping Western Australia to annihilate South Australia by 19 goals, and get to within 8 points of an all powerful 'Big V' combination. His performance earned him the inaugural Tassie Medal.

In 1939, he took over as coach of the club from Jerry Dolan, steering his side to the finals. Herb Screaigh took over in 1940, but Cronin was again coaching in 1941 after a series of bad leg injuries limited his playing appearances, and adversely affected his form when he was able to front up.

He was made a life member of the club in 1941.

== Post-playing ==
After his playing career he became a league umpire and he umpired the entire 1947 WANFL finals series (in those days there was only one field umpire during a game). It was also 1947 that saw him venture to Hobart to umpire in the first post-war Australian interstate championship series.

Cronin again coached East Perth from 1951 to 1955 – with his best successes coming in 1952 and 1953 when East Perth made it to the 1st semi final but lost. He also coached the state in 1951.

His coaching may not have reaped much for the Royals, in fact his final stint came at the end of a prolonged era of frustration for the club. However under Cronin the calibre of such players as Ted Kilmurray, Paul Seal, Kevin McGill, John Watts, Ray Webster and most notable of all Graham 'Polly' Farmer joined the club. From this one would suggest that he helped lay the foundations for the East Perth golden era that would begin when Jack Sheedy took over in 1956.

== Other ==
The West Australian Football Commission now presents the 'Mick Cronin Best Feature Story or Program' award to the best author/producer/presenter of a television feature story, documentary or program based on the WAFL or the AFL.

He was inducted into the West Australian Football Hall of Fame in March 2006.
