= Ken McAullay =

Australian sportsman

Personal information
- Full name: Kenneth James McAullay
- Born: 29 September 1949 (age 77); Subiaco, Western Australia

Playing career^{1}
Years	Club	Games (Goals)
1967–1975	East Perth	152 (1)
- ^{1} Playing statistics correct to the end of 1975.

Kenneth James McAullay (born 29 September 1949) is a former Australian sportsman who played both first class cricket with Western Australia and Australian rules football for East Perth in the West Australian Football League (WAFL).

A right-handed batsman, McAullay appeared in 22 first class cricket matches and made 1251 runs at an average of 31.27 and a high score of 86. He was more successful at football, playing most of his career at fullback. Apart from being a member of a premiership winning side at East Perth he also represented his state at interstate football. He was a best and fairest winner for East Perth in 1971, Tassie Medalist in 1972 and winner of two Simpson Medals.

McAullay served on the Board of VenuesWest between 2010 and 2016.
