= George Owens (footballer) =

Australian rules footballer and umpire

Personal information
- Full name: Albert George Percy Owens
- Nickname: Staunch
- Born: 20 August 1900; Kalgoorlie, Western Australia
- Died: 7 October 1986 (aged 86); Mount Lawley, Western Australia
- Original team: East Perth juniors
- Height: 181 cm (5 ft 11 in)
- Positions: Ruck, centre half-forward

Playing career^{1}
Years	Club	Games (Goals)	
1917–1932	East Perth	195 (226)	

Representative team honours
Years	Team	Games (Goals)	
1923–1929	Western Australia	17 (20)	

Umpiring career
Years	League	Role	Games
1935–1941	WANFL	Field umpire	135
- ^{1} Playing statistics correct to the end of 1932.

Career highlights
- East Perth premiership side 1919, 1920, 1921, 1922, 1923, 1925, 1927; Sandover Medal 1925; WANFL grand final umpire 1935, 1937, 1938, 1939, 1941; W.A. Football Hall of Fame inductee 2004; W.A. Hall of Champions inductee 2004

Albert George Percy "Staunch" Owens (20 August 1900 – 7 October 1986) was an Australian rules footballer who played for East Perth in the West Australian Football League (WAFL). He was a seven-time WAFL premiership player with East Perth and was on the losing side of a grand final three times. After turning to umpiring he was involved in a further five grand finals, a total of 15 as a player and umpire.

== Playing career ==
Born in Kalgoorlie, Western Australia, Owens moved to Perth as a child, and played in a combined Perth schools team that toured the Goldfields in 1911.

He made his debut for the East Perth team in the Ex-Scholars' league at the age of 14, and two years later made his debut for East Perth's senior team in the WAFL.

Owens was with East Perth during a golden period for the club and played in seven premiership team, including five in a row from 1919 to 1923. He was generally a ruckman but could often play as a centre half-forward. In 1925 he won the Sandover Medal, receiving four votes.

Owens finished his career with 195 WAFL games for East Perth.

He was also a regular Western Australian interstate representative and appeared for his state in both the 1924 Hobart and 1927 Melbourne carnivals. In all he represented his state on 17 occasions.

== Umpiring career ==
Following his retirement he became an umpire, beginning in 1934 in the Public Schools Association (PSA). After umpiring PSA finals in his first year, he became a WANFL umpire the following year. He officiated in the league grand final in his first year as a WANFL umpire. He later controlled the 1937, 1938, 1939 and 1941 grand finals. In all he officiated in 135 league games between 1935 and 1941.

== Honours ==
In 2004 inducted into the Western Australian Hall of Champions and the West Australian Football Hall of Fame.

== See also ==
- 1927 Melbourne Carnival
