= Luke Webster =

Australian rules footballer and coach

Personal information
- Full name: Luke Webster
- Born: 25 May 1982 (age 44)
- Original team: East Perth (WAFL)
- Height: 185 cm (6 ft 1 in)
- Weight: 86 kg (190 lb)

Playing career^{1}
Years	Club	Games (Goals)
2003–08	Fremantle	33 (11)

Representative team honours^{2}
Years	Team	Games (Goals)
2003; 2009–10	WAFL	3 (0)
- ^{1} Playing statistics correct to the end of 2008.^{2} Representative statistics correct as of 2010.

Career highlights
- WAFL representative side 2003, 2009, 2010; Simpson Medal 2003 (state); WAFL representative captain 2010

Luke Webster (born 25 May 1982) is an Australian rules football coach and former player. He played for Fremantle in the Australian Football League, and will serve as assistant coach of the Port Adelaide Football Club in the Australian Football League from 2026. He previously worked as a development coach and WAFL coach at the West Coast Eagles.

== Playing career ==
Webster played primarily as a midfielder or defender. He was drafted to the Fremantle Football Club as the first selection in the 2001 AFL Rookie Draft, and was elevated to the senior list during the 2003 season following an outstanding year for East Perth, which included being awarded the Simpson Medal as the best player for Western Australia in the state game against South Australia.

As a junior, he captained the Western Australian Under 18s team in the 2000 national championships and played for the East Perth Football Club in the WAFL, including their 2001 premiership team.

Webster's playing career was plagued by injury, having three knee reconstructions in four years. He first injured his left knee during the first game of the Under 18s carnival and had to undergo a knee reconstruction which put him out of the remainder of the 2000 season. In 2002, after showing promising form in the pre-season games for Fremantle, he suffered another injury to the left knee requiring a second knee reconstruction in a practice match against Collingwood at Fremantle Oval. A week after being one of Fremantle's best players in its first ever final in 2003, he damaged his right anterior cruciate ligament playing for East Perth in the WAFL preliminary final. He returned to the AFL for Round 21, 2004 and played the last two games of the season. After being in and out of the Fremantle team for the next 3 years, Webster injured his left knee again early in the 2008 season whilst playing for East Perth. Webster underwent a knee reconstruction via the controversial LARS method of using a synthetic ligament instead of the body's own tissue with a view to an earlier than anticipated return in season 2008.

== Coaching career ==
After the end of his playing career, Webster took on a role as a development coach at the Carlton Football Club. In 2013, he additionally took on the role of senior coach of Carlton's VFL-affiliate, the Northern Blues.

After the 2015 season Webster was released by Carlton. He then signed as a Development coach with the West Coast Eagles in October.

He became the senior coach of WAFL team East Perth for the 2017 season, before switching to be the inaugural coach of the Eagles WAFL team.

== Personal life ==
Webster's brother Ryan, father Ron and grandfather Ray also all played league football for East Perth. Ron Webster, who died in January 2006, was also the CEO of the Western Australian Amateur Football League.
