= 2020 WAFL season =

Australian rules football season

- Teams: 9
- Premiers: South Fremantle; 14th premiership
- Minor premiers: South Fremantle; 13th minor premiership
- Sandover Medallist: Sam Fisher (Swan Districts)
- Bernie Naylor Medallist: Mason Shaw (South Fremantle)

Attendance
- Matches played: 40
- Total attendance: 94,341 (2,359 per match)
- Highest: 10,179 (Grand Final Claremont Vs South Fremantle)

The 2020 WAFL season (officially the 2020 Optus WAFL Premiership Season) was the 136th season of the various incarnations of the West Australian Football League (WAFL). The season commenced on July 18 due to the COVID-19 pandemic, which forced West Coast into recess for this season.

Perth played in its first finals match since 1997, against West Perth at Arena Joondalup. Contrariwise, Peel, for over a decade and a half Perth’s perennial rivals for the wooden spoon, became the first team since 1999 to finish a Westar Rules/WAFL season without a win – indeed, before this COVID-19-shortened season, no WAFL team had managed only one win in a season since the Thunder in 2003.

== Clubs ==
Club	Home ground	Location	2019 season
Claremont	Claremont Oval	Claremont	6-2 (Runners up)
East Fremantle	East Fremantle Oval	East Fremantle	1-7 (DNQ Finals)
East Perth	Leederville Oval	Leederville	4-4 (DNQ Finals)
Peel Thunder	Rushton Park	Mandurah	0-8 (DNQ Finals)
Perth	Lathlain Park	Lathlain	5-3 (semi-final)
South Fremantle	Fremantle Oval	Fremantle	7-1 (Premiers)
Subiaco	Leederville Oval	Leederville	4-4 (DNQ Finals)
Swan Districts	Bassendean Oval	Bassendean	3-5 (DNQ Final)
West Perth	Arena Joondalup	Joondalup	6-2 (Preliminary final)

== Fixtures ==
=== Round 1 ===
	Round 1
Saturday 18 July (2:00 pm)	Peel Thunder 9.6 (60)	def. by	Perth 10.10 (70)	David Grays Arena (crowd: 3,499)
Saturday 18 July (2:30 pm)	Subiaco 11.9 (75)	def. by	Claremont 15.5 (95)	Leederville Oval (crowd: 2,304)
Saturday 18 July (2:30 pm)	Swan Districts 6.5 (41)	def. by	West Perth 8.4 (52)	Steel Blue Oval (crowd: 2,916)
Saturday 18 July (2:35 pm)	South Fremantle 18.8 (116)	def.	East Fremantle 3.3 (21)	Fremantle Community Bank Oval (crowd: 4,002)
	Bye; East Perth

=== Round 2 ===
	Round 2
Saturday 25 July (2:30 pm)	East Fremantle 13.9 (87)	def.	Peel Thunder 6.9 (45)	New Choice Homes Park (crowd: 1,757)
Saturday 25 July (2:30 pm)	West Perth 4.7 (31)	def. by	South Fremantle 5.9 (39)	Providential Finance Oval (crowd: 1,580)
Saturday 25 July (2:30 pm)	Claremont 13.7 (85)	def.	Swan Districts 7.6 (48)	Revo Fitness Stadium (crowd: 2,276)
Saturday 25 July (3:05 pm)	Perth 14.4 (88)	def.	East Perth 10.7 (67)	Mineral Resources Park (crowd: 1,801)
	Bye; Subiaco

=== Round 3 ===
	Round 3
Saturday 1 August (12:40 pm)	Swan Districts 6.4 (40)	def. by	Subiaco 11.13 (79)	Steel Blue Oval (crowd: 1,853)
Saturday 1 August (2:30 pm)	East Perth 15.9 (99)	def.	East Fremantle 8.8 (56)	Leederville Oval (crowd: 1,536)
Saturday 1 August (2:30 pm)	Peel Thunder 5.9 (39)	def. by	West Perth 20.11 (131)	David Grays Arena (crowd: 1,580)
Saturday 1 August (3:05 pm)	South Fremantle 7.6 (48)	def.	Claremont 5.10 (40)	Fremantle Community Bank Oval (crowd: 2,150)
	Bye; Perth

=== Round 4 ===
	Round 4
Saturday 8 August (2:30 pm)	West Perth 12.9 (81)	def.	East Perth 8.1 (49)	Providential Finance Oval (crowd: 2,644)
Saturday 8 August (2:30 pm)	East Fremantle 8.10 (58)	def. by	Perth 10.4 (64)	New Choice Homes Park (crowd: 1,536)
Saturday 8 August (2:30 pm)	Claremont 8.10 (58)	def.	Peel Thunder 5.5 (35)	Revo Fitness Stadium (crowd: 1,280)
Saturday 8 August (3:05 pm)	Subiaco 7.5 (47)	def. by	South Fremantle 15.7 (97)	Leederville Oval (crowd: 2,120)
	Bye; Swan Districts

=== Round 5 ===
	Round 5
Saturday 15 August (2:30 pm)	South Fremantle 10.7 (67)	def.	Swan Districts 7.5 (47)	Fremantle Community Bank Oval (crowd: 1,652)
Saturday 15 August (2:30 pm)	Peel Thunder 5.8 (38)	def. by	Subiaco 10.15 (75)	David Grays Arena (crowd: 1,422)
Saturday 15 August (2:30 pm)	Perth 12.11 (83)	def. by	West Perth 13.12 (90)	Mineral Resources Park (crowd: 1,902)
Saturday 15 August (3:05 pm)	East Perth 8.4 (52)	def. by	Claremont 12.14 (86)	Leederville Oval (crowd: 1,514)
	Bye; East Fremantle

=== Round 6 ===
	Round 6
Saturday 22 August (2:30 pm)	Subiaco 7.12 (54)	def. by	East Perth 9.9 (63)	Leederville Oval (crowd: 1,750)
Saturday 22 August (2:30 pm)	Claremont 7.11 (53)	def. by	Perth 11.4 (70)	Revo Fitness Stadium (crowd: 1,856)
Saturday 22 August (2:40 pm)	Swan Districts 9.8 (62)	def.	Peel Thunder 4.9 (33)	Steel Blue Oval (crowd: 1,733)
Saturday 22 August (3:05 pm)	West Perth 8.11 (59)	def.	East Fremantle 8.7 (55)	Providential Finance Oval (crowd: 1,348)
	Bye; South Fremantle

=== Round 7 ===
	Round 7
Saturday 29 August (12:05 pm)	Perth 9.10 (64)	def. by	Subiaco 13.12 (90)	Mineral Resources Park (crowd: 1,542)
Saturday 29 August (2:00 pm)	Peel Thunder 5.5 (35)	def. by	South Fremantle 9.16 (70)	David Grays Arena (crowd: 1,768)
Saturday 29 August (2:30 pm)	East Fremantle 9.6 (60)	def. by	Claremont 10.5 (65)	New Choice Homes Park (crowd: 2,105)
Saturday 29 August (2:35 pm)	East Perth 11.9 (75)	def.	Swan Districts 6.4 (40)	Leederville Oval (crowd: 1,757)
	Bye; West Perth

=== Round 8 ===
	Round 8
Saturday 5 September (2:30 pm)	Subiaco 12.12 (84)	def.	East Fremantle 6.7 (43)	Leederville Oval (crowd: 1,475)
Saturday 5 September (2:30 pm)	Claremont 10.12 (72)	def.	West Perth 5.11 (41)	Revo Fitness Stadium (crowd: 2,284)
Saturday 5 September (2:35 pm)	South Fremantle 13.7 (85)	def.	East Perth 9.9 (63)	Fremantle Community Bank Oval (crowd: 2,919)
Saturday 5 September (3:05 pm)	Swan Districts 11.9 (75)	def.	Perth 7.6 (48)	Steel Blue Oval (crowd: 2,558)
	Bye; Peel Thunder

=== Round 9 ===
	Round 9
Saturday 12 September (2:30 pm)	East Perth 15.11 (101)	def.	Peel Thunder 4.6 (30)	Leederville Oval (crowd: 1,257)
Saturday 12 September (2:30 pm)	West Perth 12.5 (77)	def.	Subiaco 8.10 (58)	Providential Finance Oval (crowd: 2,574)
Saturday 12 September (4:30 pm)	Perth 8.18 (66)	def.	South Fremantle 9.7 (61)	Mineral Resources Park (crowd: 2,201)
Sunday 13 September (2:05 pm)	East Fremantle 6.8 (44)	def. by	Swan Districts 11.9 (75)	New Choice Homes Park (crowd: 1,852)
	Bye; Claremont

== Ladder ==
2020 WAFL ladder
Pos	Team	Pld	W	L	D	PF	PA	PP	Pts	
1	South Fremantle (P)	8	7	1	0	583	350	166.6	28	Finals series
2	Claremont	8	6	2	0	554	429	129.1	24	Finals series
3	West Perth	8	6	2	0	562	436	128.9	24	Finals series
4	Perth	8	5	3	0	553	554	99.8	20	Finals series
5	East Perth	8	4	4	0	569	520	109.4	16	
6	Subiaco	8	4	4	0	562	517	108.7	16	
7	Swan Districts	8	3	5	0	428	483	88.6	12	
8	East Fremantle	8	1	7	0	424	607	69.9	4	
9	Peel Thunder	8	0	8	0	315	654	48.2	0	

Source: Australian Football
Rules for classification: 1) points; 2) percentage; 3) number of points for.
(P) Premiers

== Finals ==
=== Semi-finals ===
	Semi-finals
Sunday 20 September (1:35 pm)	West Perth 7.6 (48)	def.	Perth 5.7 (37)	Provident Financial Oval (crowd: 3,850)
Sunday 20 September (2:30 pm)	South Fremantle 3.6 (24)	def. by	Claremont 10.11 (71)	Fremantle Community Bank Oval (crowd: 2,983)

=== Preliminary final ===
	Preliminary final
Sunday 27 September (3:35 pm)	South Fremantle 11.5 (71)	def.	West Perth 7.8 (50)	Fremantle Community Bank Oval (crowd: 5,026)

=== Grand Final ===
2020 WAFL Grand Final
Sunday 4 October (3:10 pm)	Claremont	def. by	South Fremantle	Fremantle Oval (crowd: 10,179)
1.1 (7); 2.4 (16); 5.6 (36); 6.7 (43)	Q1; Q2; Q3; Final	1.1 (7); 2.7 (19); 4.10 (34); 6.10 (46)	Umpires: Matt Adams (6) Jordan Fry (7) Ben Laycock (27); Simpson Medal: Jye Bolton (Claremont); Television broadcast: Seven Network
3: Waterman; 1: England, Edwards, Hardisty	Goals	3: Strom; 1: Donaldson, Main, Shaw, Miller
Waterman, Bolton, Rogers, Bailey	Best	Strom, Dragovich, Main, Scloithe

== See also ==
- List of WAFL premiers
- Australian rules football
- West Australian Football League
- Australian Football League
- 2020 AFL season
