= Glen Bartlett =

Personal information
- Full name: Glen Robert Bartlett
- Born: 6 October 1964 (age 62)
- Height: 195 cm (6 ft 5 in)
- Weight: 95 kg (209 lb)
- Position: Key forward

Playing career^{1}
Years	Club	Games (Goals)
1983–1993	East Perth	153 (261)
1987	West Coast	4 (0)
Total		157 (261)
- ^{1} Playing statistics correct to the end of 1993.

Glen Robert Bartlett (born 6 October 1964) is a former chairman of the Melbourne Football Club and Australian rules footballer for the West Coast Eagles in the Victorian Football League (VFL) and East Perth in the West Australian Football League (WAFL).

== Biography ==
Bartlett was used mostly as a key forward at East Perth. He joined West Coast for their inaugural VFL season in 1987, playing four matches and winning their "Best Clubman" award. Despite this, Bartlett was delisted and returned to East Perth, playing until 1993, including kicking 69 goals in 1990 to win the Bernie Naylor Medal, and representing Western Australia against South Australia in 1990, kicking three goals from full-forward in the first half.

He received another chance to play in the VFL when he was drafted by the Brisbane Bears at number 38 in the 1990 mid-season draft, but refused to move from Perth. A trade was considered with Melbourne Football Club for a full-forward; however the Demons went for Allen Jakovich instead.

Bartlett spent four years as captain of East Perth, including achieving life membership at the age of 26, before retiring to concentrate on his law studies. Bartlett became a lawyer in 1996, a partner in the workplace relations team of Clayton Utz in 2000, founding the Perth practice. In 2008 Bartlett moved to Melbourne and was appointed Managing Partner of Clayton Utz Melbourne in late 2010 and served until 2013. He was appointed to the Melbourne Football Club board during the 2013 AFL season, following Don McLardy's resignation. On 16 August 2013, Bartlett was named as the president of the Melbourne Football Club. In 2021 Bartlett stood down as President, with Melbourne going on to win its first premiership in 57 years under new president Kate Roffey.
