= Kevin Bryant =

Australian rules footballer (born 1955)

Personal information
- Full name: Kevin Ronald Bryant
- Born: 8 January 1955 (age 71)
- Height: 189 cm (6 ft 2 in)
- Weight: 87 kg (192 lb)

Playing career^{1}
Years	Club	Games (Goals)
1973–78, 1985-86	East Perth	95 (72)
1979–1984	North Melbourne	58 (38)
- ^{1} Playing statistics correct to the end of 1986.

Kevin Ronald Bryant (born 8 January 1955) is a former Australian rules footballer who played with East Perth in the Western Australian National Football League (WANFL) and North Melbourne in the Victorian Football League (VFL). He also represented Western Australia in State of Origin football.

== Career ==
Bryant was the centre half-back in East Perth's 1978 WANFL premiership team and won their Best and Fairest award the same year.

He came to North Melbourne in 1979 and late in the season kicked three goals in their Qualifying Final win over Collingwood at the MCG. A utility, Bryant then returned to Perth to represent Western Australia at the Perth State of Origin Carnival.

Bryant later served as West Coast's player match-up coordinator.

== Personal life ==
Bryant is the father-in-law of former West Coast Eagles player Andrew Embley.
