= Stephen Curtis =

Australian rules footballer

Personal information
- Full name: Stephen William Curtis
- Born: 19 June 1956 (age 70)
- Position: Defender

Playing career^{1}
Years	Club	Games (Goals)
1973–1982	East Perth (WAFL)	215 (61)
1983–1988	Port Adelaide (SANFL)	125 (44)
- ^{1} Playing statistics correct to the end of 1988.

Career highlights
- All-Australian, 1983

Stephen William Curtis (born 19 June 1956) is a former Australian rules footballer who played with East Perth in the West Australian Football League (WAFL) and Port Adelaide in the South Australian National Football League (SANFL).

Curtis, a defender, started his career in his home state of Western Australia where he debuted for East Perth in 1973. He was a back pocket in East Perth's 1978 premiership side, the same position he was later named in their official post-war 'Team of the Century'. A dual Fairest and Best winner, Curtis took home the F. D. Book Medal in 1977 and 1982.

Port Adelaide acquired his services in 1983 and he spent six seasons with the club. He represented South Australia in an interstate game during the 1983 season and was selected in the All-Australian team. Curtis had previously represented Western Australia in 12 interstate games, including their inaugural State of Origin encounter against Victoria in 1977.
