= Patrick McGinnity =

Australian rules footballer (born 1989)

Personal information
- Full name: Patrick Dane McGinnity
- Nickname: Paddy
- Born: 18 February 1989 (age 37)
- Original team: Marist JFC
- Draft: No. 7, 2008 pre-season draft
- Height: 184 cm (6 ft 0 in)
- Weight: 78 kg (172 lb)
- Position: Defender

Playing career^{1}
Years	Club	Games (Goals)
2009–2016	West Coast	93 (29)
- ^{1} Playing statistics correct to the end of 2016.

Career highlights
- East Perth best and fairest 2018; East Perth co-captain 2017-present; WAFL Colts Team of the Year 2007; Under-18 All-Australian team 2007

Patrick Dane McGinnity (born 18 February 1989) is a former professional Australian rules footballer who played for the West Coast Eagles in the Australian Football League (AFL). He was recruited from the Claremont Football Club in the West Australian Football League (WAFL) with the seventh pick in the 2008 Pre-Season draft, and made his debut for the club in round 15 of the 2009 AFL season. He was delisted at the end of the 2016 season, having played 93 games.

== Early life ==
McGinnity was born in Perth to Kevin and Delys (née Whittle) McGinnity. His father played 59 games for the East Perth Football Club, and his maternal grandfather, Alvin Whittle, played 108 games for the West Perth Football Club. McGinnity attended Trinity College, Perth, and also played junior football for the Marist Junior Football Club. He represented the state under-18 team at the 2007 AFL Under 18 Championships, and was named on the interchange in the 2007 Under-18 All-Australian team.

== AFL career ==
McGinnity was recruited with the seventh pick in the 2008 Pre-Season draft, and made his debut for the West Coast Eagles in 2009 against St Kilda, playing 7 games in his debut year and 17 in 2010. In round one of the 2010 season, he was one of the Eagles' best, winning 24 disposals and kicking a goal. In 2011 he has continued to play in a tagging role. In August 2011, McGinnity was fined A$2500 and suspended by the West Coast Eagles for one match after allegations that he had threatened to "rape" Ricky Petterd's mother during the Eagles' round 21 match against Melbourne.

McGinnity is most remembered as the player Collingwood captain Nick Maxwell controversially took out of the game through a seemingly illegal shepherd during a NAB Cup match in early 2009. As a result, McGinnity was injured and was out of the side for 10 weeks. For his part, Maxwell was initially suspended for four matches, but his club launched a successful appeal which saw Maxwell exonerated.

McGinnity was delisted at the conclusion of the 2016 AFL season, having managed only three games during that season.
