= Brendan Lee =

Australian rules footballer (born 1987)

Personal information
- Born: 9 September 1987 (age 39)
- Original team: East Perth (WAFL)
- Draft: No. 78, 2012 Rookie Draft, Essendon
- Height: 181 cm (5 ft 11 in)
- Weight: 78 kg (172 lb)

Playing career^{1}
Years	Club	Games (Goals)
2012	Essendon	2 (0)
- ^{1} Playing statistics correct to the end of 2012.

Brendan Lee (born 9 September 1987) is a former professional Australian rules football player at the Essendon Football Club in the Australian Football League (AFL), and most notable for his long career with East Perth in the West Australian Football League (WAFL).

Originally from East Perth, Lee made his senior WAFL debut in 2007 at age 19. By 2010, he was a regular senior player for the Royals, and he won the club's best and fairest award in 2011. After sixty games for the club and at age 24, he was recruited to the Australian Football League by Essendon with a late selection in the 2012 Rookie Draft (No. 78 overall). He played two senior games for Essendon during 2012, debuting in Round 20 against North Melbourne at Docklands Stadium, and played in the Victorian Football League for Essendon's VFL-affiliate Bendigo during the season. He was delisted at the end of the season, and returned to East Perth, where he won another club best and fairest in 2013 and became club captain.

Lee, along with 33 other Essendon players, was found guilty of using a banned performance-enhancing substance, thymosin beta-4, as part of Essendon's sports supplements program during the 2012 season. He and his team-mates were initially found not guilty in March 2015 by the AFL Anti-Doping Tribunal, but a guilty verdict was returned in January 2016 after an appeal by the World Anti-Doping Agency. He was suspended for two years which, with backdating, ended in November 2016; as a result, he served approximately fourteen months of his suspension and missed the entire 2016 WAFL season. He retired from WAFL football after his suspension, finishing with 124 games for the Royals in his career.
