= William "Digger" Thomas =

Australian rules footballer

Personal information
- Full name: William Alfred Benjamin Thomas
- Born: 3 June 1890; Broken Hill, New South Wales
- Died: 6 October 1953 (aged 63)
- Original team: Warriors

Playing career^{1}
Years	Club	Games (Goals)
1911–1914	Subiaco	57 (10)
1915–1916, 1918-1928	East Perth	177 (76)
1917	East Fremantle	13 (1)
Total		247 (87)
- ^{1} Playing statistics correct to the end of 1928.

Career highlights
- WAFL premiership player 1913, 1919-1923, 1927

William Alfred Benjamin "Digger" Thomas (3 June 1890 – 6 October 1953) was an Australian rules footballer who played with East Perth and Subiaco in the West Australian Football League (WAFL).

He is always mentioned in football records with his nickname, Digger, as there was another William Thomas (not related) who also appeared for East Perth and won a Sandover Medal six years after Digger Thomas did.

Thomas, who was born in Broken Hill, started out in the Goldfields Football League where he played for the Warriors. He joined the WAFL in 1911 and played 32 games for Subiaco, including their 1913 premiership team; Thomas had missed their inaugural premiership side the previous year as he had been suspended for striking.

After a season with East Fremantle in 1917, Thomas transferred to East Perth where he would spend the rest of his career. He was a member of six premierships, five of them in succession, and won a Sandover Medal in 1923 to become the first ever East Perth player to win the award.

He represented Western Australia in a total of twelve interstate matches, including the 1914, 1921 and 1924 carnivals. At the Sydney Carnival of 1914 he put in a memorable performance in a game against Queensland, kicking 14 goals.

Thomas retired at the end of the 1928 season, having also spent some time coaching in New South Wales, with his 247 career games remaining a West Australian elite football record until it was broken by Ray Schofield in Round 10 of 1958; Schofield retired at the end of that season having played 259 games.

He was the father of East Perth and Essendon player Ritchie Thomas.
