= Grant Dorrington =

Personal information
- Full name: Grant Stephen Dorrington
- Born: 5 April 1948 (age 78)

Playing career
Years	Club	Games (Goals)
1967–72	East Perth	45 (111)

Coaching career
Years	Club	Games (W–L–D)
1980–81	East Perth	

Grant Stephen Dorrington OAM BEM (born 15 April 1948) is an Australian rules football administrator who is a former player and coach.

== Playing career ==
Dorrington played 45 matches for East Perth in the Western Australian National Football League (WANFL) between 1967 and 1972.

Dorrington's premature retirement came after doctors advised him to stop playing after a series of knocks to the head in early 1972.

== Coaching and administration career ==
Dorrington joined the coaching ranks in the late 1970s and was assistant to Barry Cable when East Perth won the 1978 WANFL Grand Final.

In 1980, Dorrington was appointed head coach of East Perth, serving two seasons. Dorrington returned to coaching in 1985 when he was coach of the Western Australian team at the Teal Cup.

He joined the West Australian Football Commission and has at various times been the Director of Football, General Manager of the Football Development Trust and of the West Australian Football League and Director of Pathways and Competition.

== Road safety ==
Dorrington was the chairman of the Western Australian Road Safety Council between 1997 and 2009.

== Honours ==
In 1979 Dorrington was awarded the British Empire Medal (BEM) for services to the Western Australian sesquicentennial. Dorrington received the Medal of the Order of Australia (OAM) for services to road safety and Australian rules football in Western Australia.
