= Ian McCulloch (footballer) =

Australian rules footballer

Personal information
- Full name: Ian William McCulloch
- Born: 11 June 1948 (age 78)
- Original team: East Perth
- Height: 191 cm (6 ft 3 in)
- Weight: 99 kg (218 lb)
- Position: Ruck

Playing career^{1}
Years	Club	Games (Goals)
1966–71, 76–79	East Perth	104 (29)
1972–75	Fitzroy	60 (16)
- ^{1} Playing statistics correct to the end of 1979.

Ian William McCulloch (born 11 June 1948) is a former Australian rules footballer who played with Fitzroy in the Victorian Football League (VFL) and East Perth in the West Australian Football League (WAFL).
