= East Perth Football Club =

Australian rules football club in the WAFL

East Perth

Names
- Full name: East Perth Football Club
- Former name: Union Football Club (1902–06)
- Nickname: Royals
- Motto: "Regii hodie et heri et cras maneamus"

2025 season
- After finals: 2nd
- Leading goalkicker: Tom Medhat; Sam Van Dieman; Sebit Kuek (25 goals)
- Best and fairest: Scott Jones

Club details
- Founded: 1902
- Colours: Blue Black
- Competition: West Australian Football League
- Chairperson: Bronte Howson OAM
- Coach: Ross McQueen
- Premierships: 17 (1919, 1920, 1921, 1922, 1923, 1926, 1927, 1936, 1944, 1956, 1958, 1959, 1972, 1978, 2000, 2001, 2002)
- Grounds: Leederville Oval (capacity: 18,000)
- Perth Oval (capacity: 20,500)

Uniforms
Home

Other information
- Official website: eastperthfc.com.au

The East Perth Football Club, nicknamed the Royals, is an Australian rules football club based in Leederville, Western Australia, current playing in the West Australian Football League (WAFL) and WAFL Women's (WAFLW). Formed in 1902 as the Union Football Club, the club entered the WAFL in 1906, changing its name to East Perth. It won its first premiership in 1919, part of a streak of five consecutive premierships. Overall, the club has won 17 premierships, most recently in 2002. The club is currently based at Leederville Oval, which it shares with the Subiaco Football Club, having previously played home games at Wellington Square (from 1901 to 1909) and Perth Oval (formerly known as Loton Park) from 1910 to 1999.

From 2014 until 2018, East Perth served as the host club for the West Coast Eagles of the Australian Football League, the arrangement saw West Coast's reserves players playing in the WAFL for East Perth.

== History ==
The club was actually founded in 1902 as Union Football Club (not to be confused with the defunct Unions club from Fremantle) and competed in the Perth Third Rate Association Competition (however an earlier 'East Perth' had formed in 1891). The club was successful and was promoted to the First Rate Association. After continuing to succeed at this level they applied to join the WAFL and hence became a member in April 1906. The club became known as East Perth in accordance with the WAFL's policy of having each club represent a district in Perth.

After a relatively slow start – despite being competitive from its first season – East Perth after World War I went on to become one of the most powerful clubs in the West Australian league with the appointment of former Subiaco player Phil Matson as captain-coach. The club won five consecutive WAFL premierships between 1919 and 1923, and after a brief lapse due to Matson's death in a truck crash recovered to contest the finals every year from 1931 to 1940, but won only one premiership – a frustrating record to be repeated in the 1970s.

Although the club garnered an undefeated premiership in the under-age WAFL competition in 1944, East Perth became very much a middle-of-the-road side after open-age WANFL football resumed until the emergence of champion ruckman Graham "Polly" Farmer in 1956. That year, despite being held to the lowest WAFL score between 1946 and 2002 by Perth in torrential rain and genuine darkness at the WACA, the Royals won fourteen of their nineteen games and beat South Fremantle twice in the finals. Under the coaching of Jack Sheedy, and aided by becoming the first WAFL club to pay players formally, the club contested the following five grand finals for further premierships in 1958 and 1959 and a huge upset loss to Swan Districts in 1961.

The loss of Farmer, however, saw a decline in fortunes: in 1964 the club won only one of its first eighteen games and finished with its first wooden spoon since 1929, but with the recruitment of Kevin Murray the club returned to the top quickly. It returned to the finals in 1966 and played therein during every one of the next seventeen seasons except 1974. During these years East Perth won 246 and drew one of 388 games for a success rate of 63.5 percent: clearly the highest in a competition that – at least during the first half of this period – was extremely even and characterised by very rapid fluctuations in teams' fortunes. By 1980, the club had made a submission to enter the VFL/AFL, however this was withdrawn, and from 1983 their fortunes declined abruptly: between 1985 and 1995 East Perth won only eighty and draw one of 235 games for a success rate of 34.26%. Indeed, between 1985 and 1989, the Royals actually won just 24 of 105 games for a success rate of 22.8% and did not finish above sixth, with a lowlight being the sacking of coach Greg Brehaut on 13 May 1986 that was followed by a walk-out of three managers from a reserves team that had won five matches out of seven.

In 1996 the Royals returned to prominence and took the minor premiership before losing narrowly to Claremont in its first grand final since 1978. However, the club returned to the lower reaches of the ladder in 1999, winning only five of twenty games. East Perth later acted as the host club for West Coast Eagles players recruited from interstate from 2000 to 2001 until the host club arrangement was abolished. This made them favoured for high honours in 2000 – which was achieved with five Eagles in the grand final side, though the Royals' "old guard" made a much larger contribution than expected to the club's first flag for twenty-two years. It repeated the dose emphatically in 2001, holding South Fremantle to 0.3 (3) after half time, and yet again in 2002, but fell off steadily in the following four seasons to win only six games in 2005. A partial recovery in 2007 saw the Royals finish fourth, but it returned to last in 2008 before again rebounding in 2009 to finish fifth.

Its first home ground was Wellington Square. It then moved to Perth Oval between 1910 and 2002, although it played games at the WACA from 1988 to 1989. East Perth began playing its games at Leederville Oval from 2000, formerly the home of bitter rivals West Perth), but the club only officially moved there in 2003. They have since been joined at the ground by the Subiaco Football Club.

East Perth finished runners up in the 2025 WAFL Grand Final, narrowly losing to South Fremantle. The final whistle was considered by some as somewhat controversial as East Perth were awarded a free kick in the centre of the field but were correctly not awarded a 50m penalty.

== Current squad ==
As of Apr 2026:

1 Jacob Msando
2 Sam Van Diemen
3 Cooper Stephens
4 Shayne Hille
5 Kye Willcocks
6 Coby Burgiel
7 Stanley Wright
8 Tom Medhat
9 William Cassidy
10 Jordyn Baker
11 Riley Saunders
12 Thomas Graham
13 Christian Ameduri
14 Ben Middleton
15 James Sturrock
16 Tom North
17 Luke Foley
18 Nick Robertson
19 Brad Fullgrabe
20 Ethan Regan
21 Harrison Macreadie
22 Hamish Brayshaw
23 Sebit Kuek
24 Damon Freitag
25 Brody Delaney
26 Mitchell Schofield
27 Angus Scott
28 Scott Jones
29 Jake Soutar
30 Corey Watts
31 Andre Gullini
32 Jayden Peak
33 Darcy Craven
34 Jacob Spaveski
35 Liam Tedesco
36 Kade Screaigh
37 Zac Raykos
38 Isaac Parker
39 Xavier Milner
40 Harry Micallef
41 Zaiden Ladyman
42
43 Adam De Masi
44 Josh Harris
45 Bailey Maxwell
46 Aniello Pizzolante
47 Tyler Lindberg
48 Bailey McCauley
49 Jack Gallagher
50 Devan Wulff
51 Max Donnelly
52 Taj McCartney
53 Fletcher Brown
54
55 Connor Cole
56 Stuart Guest
57 Jason Kissack
58 Riley Longson
59 Liam McAlister
60 Zac Ransom
61 Cole Trinder
62 Kael Wallace
63 William Akec
64 Oscar Benger
65 Bonheur Cubahiro
66
67
68 Jack Omodei
69
70 David Whitby
71 Jack Whitby
72 Jack Clarey

== Rivalries ==
East Perth's traditional and most bitter rivals are West Perth Football Club. Known as the Perth Derby, they have competed in many historic matches including Grand Finals in 1922, 1932, 1960, 1969, 1971, 2002, when East Perth defeated the Falcons by 60 points to complete a hat-trick of premierships, and 2013.

The East Perth vs Perth fixtures were a significant rivalry in the 1960s and 1970s, including the famous 1978 Grand Final. However its significance is somewhat muted compared to the former mentioned fixture, possibly due to Perth's lacklustre performances since the late 1970s.

Another newer rivalry is that with co-tenants Subiaco Football Club. East Perth had not beaten Subiaco since they began sharing the ground in 2004, until the 2007 season when East Perth came from over forty points behind at half time to win the game by three points. Recent games have become even more bitter with the transfer of players Travis Knights, Caine Hayes and Paul Ridley to Subiaco under controversial circumstances. Off the field the two clubs do have a good working relationship in regard to their ground sharing situation.

== Club song ==
East Perth Forever Boys is the theme song of the East Perth Football Club, played as the league team comes to the field at either a home game or final, and after a victory at a home game or final. It is sung to the tune of Anchors Aweigh The lyrics were written by John K. Watts, an ex-player of the club. He was also responsible for the club songs of Swan Districts Football Club and Geelong Football Club. The recording of the song used by the club was performed by Clem Grogan and the Blue Brass. Hobart also has a song sung to the tune of Anchors Aweigh. Its lyrics are very similar to East Perth Forever Boys.

East Perth...East Perth

East Perth forever boys
East Perth are we
East Perth a great tradition
With the premiership our mission
East Perth forever boys
And to the cause
For we are the mighty Royals
East Perth is the greatest team of all

We'll beat the Cardies
Whether it be wet or fine
We'll beat the others
At the bell they'll be behind
No doubt about
The reason for it

East Perth forever boys
East Perth are we
East Perth a great tradition
With the premiership our mission
East Perth forever boys
And to the cause
For we are the mighty Royals
East Perth is the greatest team of all

== Honours ==
=== Club honours ===
Premierships
Competition	Level	Wins	Years won
West Australian Football League	Men's Seniors	17	1919, 1920, 1921, 1922, 1923, 1926, 1927, 1936, 1944, 1956, 1958, 1959, 1972, 1978, 2000, 2001, 2002
West Australian Football League	Men's Reserves	15	1932, 1933, 1934, 1935, 1948, 1961, 1965, 1966, 1967 1976, 1978, 1981, 1983, 2020, 2025
West Australian Football League	Colts (Boys U19)	5	1967, 1975, 1980, 2000, 2006
West Australian Football League	Fourths (1965–1974)	2	1965, 1967
Perth First Rate Association	Juniors	1	1904 (Note: Premiership won as the "Union Football Club".)
Perth Third Rate Association	Juniors	2	1902, 1903
Other titles and honours
Rodriguez Shield	Multiple	9	1958, 1959, 1961, 1966, 1967, 1969, 1971, 1976, 2000
State Premiership	Men's Seniors (1902–1924)	3	1919, 1922, 1923
Finishing positions
West Australian Football League	Minor premiership (men's seniors)	22	1910, 1918, 1919, 1920, 1922, 1923, 1926, 1927, 1944, 1956, 1957, 1959, 1961, 1967, 1969, 1971, 1976, 1996, 2000, 2002, 2014, 2024
West Australian Football League	Runners-up (men's seniors)	18	1910, 1918, 1928, 1932, 1957, 1960, 1961, 1966, 1967, 1968, 1969, 1971, 1976, 1996, 2013, 2014, 2024, 2025
West Australian Football League	Wooden spoons (men's seniors)	7	1911, 1913, 1929, 1964, 1985, 1989, 2008
West Australian Football League	Wooden spoons (women's seniors)	2	2023, 2025

=== Individual honours ===
Sandover Medallists: (19 total) 1923: William 'Digger' Thomas, 1925: George 'Staunch' Owens (1925), 1929: Billy Thomas, 1950: Frank Allen, 1956: Graham Farmer, 1957: Graham Farmer, 1958: Ted Kilmurray, 1960: Graham Farmer, 1969: Malcolm Brown, 1975: Alan Quartermaine, 1976: Peter Spencer, 1978: Phil Kelly, 1979: Phil Kelly, 1983: John Ironmonger, 1984: Peter Spencer, 1988: David Bain, 1997: Brady Anderson, 2001: Ryan Turnbull, 2023: Hamish Brayshaw

Simpson Medallists: (7 total) 1958: Ned Bull, 1959: Graham Farmer, 1972: Ken McAullay, 1978: Ian Miller, 2000: Dean Cox, 2001: Ryan Turnbull, 2002: Ryan Turnbull

Bernie Naylor Medallists: (10 total) 1909: Sam Sloss (30), 1924: Bonny Campbell (67), 1926: Bonny Campbell (89), 1927: Bonny Campbell (87), 1944: Alan Watts (101), 1958: William Mose (115), 1959: Neil Hawke (114), 1967: Phil Tierney (119), 1990: Glen Bartlett (69), 2006: Troy Wilson (74), 2013: Josh Smith (62)

All Australians: 1956, 1958 & 1961: Graham Farmer, 1966: Kevin Murray, 1966: Keith Doncon, 1972: Mal Brown, 1972: Ken McAullay, 1979: Barry Cable

Tassie Medallists: (3 total) 1937: Mick Cronin, 1956: Graham Farmer, 1972: Ken McAullay

JJ Leonard Medallists: (1 total) 2014: Brian Dawson

==== F.D. Book Medallists ====
The F.D. Book Medal is awarded to the club's fairest and best player at the end of each season from 1926 onwards.

== Records ==
Highest Score: Round 1, 1944 – 41.30 (276) vs. South Fremantle at Perth Oval

Lowest Score: Round 13, 1909 – 0.6 (6) vs. East Fremantle at Fremantle Oval

Greatest Winning Margin: Round 1, 1944 – 256 points vs. South Fremantle at Perth Oval

Greatest Losing Margin: Round 20, 1987 – 169 points vs. Claremont at WACA

Most Games: Craig Wulff 286 (2002–2016)

Most Goals: Phil Tierney 620 (1962–1972)

Record Home Attendance: Round 9, 1969 – 26,760 vs. West Perth at Perth Oval.

Record Finals Attendance: 1969 Grand Final – 51,385 vs. West Perth at Subiaco Oval.

== "Teams of the century" ==
With the launch of the East Perth history book in mid-2006, an expert panel from the club came up with two "teams of the century", one pre-war team from 1906 to 1944, and the other from 1945 to 2005

=== Pre-war team ===
Pre-war team
B:	Wally Fletcher	Harry Sherlock	Alby Western
HB:	Nashy Brentnall	Ray Star	Archie Herd
C:	Ike Allen	William 'Digger' Thomas	Jackie Guhl
HF:	Mick Cronin (c)	Paddy Hebbard	Bert Harrold
F:	William 'Billy' Thomas	Bonny Campbell	Harold Gepp
Foll:	George Owens	Val Sparrow	Larry Duffy
Int:	Herbie Screaigh		
Coach:	Phillip Matson		

=== Post-war team ===
Post-war team
B:	Stephen Curtis	John Watts	Mal Atwell
HB:	Ken McAullay	Ross Glendinning	Jim Washbourne
C:	Phil Kelly	Syd Jackson	Derek Chadwick
HF:	Ted Kilmurray	Malcolm Brown	Peter Spencer
F:	Ron Alexander	Phil Tierney	Keith Doncon
Foll:	Graham Farmer	Kevin Murray	Jack Sheedy (c)
Int:	Bradley Smith	Bob Graham	Tom Everett
Int:	Ryan Turnbull		
Coach:	Jack Sheedy		

== Honourboard ==
The East Perth Football Club's senior best and fairest player wins the F. D. Book Medal, named in honour of long time club administrator Fred Book.

Year	Place	Record	Coach	Captain	Best & Fairest (F. D. Book Medal)	Leading goalkickers
1906	7th	5–12	W.Plunkett	John Woollard	–	Don McKinnon (11)
1907	6th	7–10	J.Kennedy	J.Kennedy	–	Jack Oliver (19)
1908	5th	7–9–1	J.Kennedy	I.Brown	–	Sam Sloss (31)
1909	3rd	10–8	Henry "Ivo" Crapp	P.Wallish	–	Sam Sloss (30)
1910	R/Up	14–5	Bob Burns	Bob Burns	–	Sam Sloss (28)
1911	7th (Wooden Spoon)	2–10	Bob Burns	Charles Hardisty	–	Bill Gagner (9)
1912	5th	5–11	B.Wallish	Charlie McKenzie	–	Sam Sloss (20)
1913	7th (Wooden Spoon)	2–10	P.Shea	Arthur Nash	–	Albert Oates (14)
1914	5th	7–7	G.Sparrow	C.Morrissey	–	Ernie Sellars (22)
1915	4th	13–9	G.Sparrow; Hedley Tomkins	Charlie McKenzie	–	Ernie Sellars (34)
1916	5th	4–8	–	William 'Digger' Thomas	–	Jim Wallace (27)
1917	5th	4–8	C.Waugh	Paddy Finlay	–	William Silverstone (20)
1918	R/Up	14–3	Phil Matson	William 'Digger' Thomas	–	George Owens (22)
1919	Premiers	14–3	Phil Matson	Chris Slattery	–	Harold Gepp (20)
1920	Premiers	11–6	Phil Matson	Charlie McKenzie; Chris Slattery	–	George Owens (17)
1921	Premiers	11–7	Phil Matson	Vern Harold; Charlie McKenzie	–	Paddy Hebbard (23)
1922	Premiers	12–4	Phil Matson	Vern Harold	–	Gus Giese (40)
1923	Premiers	13–4	Phil Matson	Vern Harold	–	Bert Harold (36)
1924	3rd	12–4	Phil Matson	William 'Digger' Thomas	–	Bonny Campbell (67)
1925	4th	9–8	Paddy Hebbard	Paddy Hebbard	–	Bonny Campbell (53)
1926	Premiers	15–4–1	Phil Matson	Harold Gepp	"Plum" Duffy	Bonny Campbell (89)
1927	Premiers	16–5	Phil Matson	Harold Gepp	Joe O'Meara	Bonny Campbell (87)
1928	R/Up	12–8–1	Phil Matson; Paddy Hebbard	W. Fletcher	Billy Thomas	Bonny Campbell (61)
1929	7th (Wooden Spoon)	2–16	Val Sparrow	"Plum" Duffy	Billy Thomas	Bob Crow (33)
1930	5th	8–10	Val Sparrow	Val Sparrow	Albert Davies	Ken O'Reilly (36)
1931	3rd	12–8–1	Val Sparrow	Val Sparrow	Mick Cronin	Billy Thomas (30)
1932	R/Up	11–10	Val Sparrow	Val Sparrow	Herb Screaigh	Ken O'Reilly (51)
1933	4th	9–10	–	Jackie Guhl	Herb Screaigh	Paul Lockyer (72)
1934	4th	13–8–1	Jerry Dolan	Bob Bennett	Herb Screaigh	Herb Screaigh (45)
1935	3rd	13–7	Jerry Dolan	Dick Lawn	Brian Ryan	Paul Lockyer (31); Herb Screaigh (31); Seff Parry (31)
1936	Premiers	13–10	Jerry Dolan	Mick Cronin	Leo Graham	Frank McAllon (42)
1937	3rd	13–7–3	Jerry Dolan	Mick Cronin	Herb Screaigh	Cecil Rowland (87)
1938	3rd	11–10–1	Jerry Dolan	Mick Cronin	Ray Starr	Herb Screaigh (43)
1939	3rd	15–7	Mick Cronin	Mick Cronin	Dave Miller; Ritchie Thomas	Austin Gardener (78)
1940	4th	13–8	Herb Screaigh	Mick Cronin	Ritchie Thomas	Austin Gardener (40)
1941	5th	12–8	Mick Cronin	Herb Screaigh	Max O'Loughlin	Max O'Loughlin (47)
1942; Underage Comp	3rd	11–8	Billy Thomas	Neil Reiger	John (Todge) Campbell	Ron Brentnall (38)
1943; Underage Comp	5th	7–10	Val Sparrow	Mick George	Ray Perry	John (Todge) Campbell (55)
1944; Underage Comp	Premiers	21–0	Cecil Rowland	Allan Watts	John (Todge) Campbell	Alan Watts (101)
1945	6th	9–11	Cecil Rowland	Cecil Rowland	Harry Outridge	Cecil Rowland (62)
1946	6th	7–11–1	Cecil Rowland	Jack Sweet	Jim Washbourne	Max O'Loughlin (53)
1947	5th	10–9	Val Sparrow	Jack Sweet	Norm Gibney	Max O'Loughlin (41)
1948	5th	10–9	Val Sparrow	Jack Sweet	Frank Sparrow	Jim Washbourne (41)
1949	5th	9–9	Seff Parry	Don Matson; Frank Sparrow	Ray Perry	Jack Webb (34)
1950	6th	6–15	Johnny Larcombe; Colin Pestell	Johnny Larcombe; Colin Pestell	Frank Allen	Jack Smith (42)
1951	5th	12–9	Mick Cronin	Frank Sparrow	Ray Perry	Jack Smith (88)
1952	4th	13–8	Mick Cronin	Jim Spencer	Frank Sparrow	Jack Smith (77)
1953	5th	8–13	Mick Cronin	Jim Spencer	Jim Spencer	Jack Smith (72)
1954	5th	8–12	Mick Cronin	Jim Spencer	Graham Farmer	Ted Kilmurray (61)
1955	5th	7–13	Mick Cronin	Jim Spencer	Graham Farmer	Ted Kilmurray (68)
1956	Premiers	16–5	Jack Sheedy	Jack Sheedy	Graham Farmer	Ted Kilmurray (51)
1957	R/Up	18–5	Jack Sheedy	Jack Sheedy	Graham Farmer	Kevin McGill (52)
1958	Premiers	18–6	Jack Sheedy	Jack Sheedy	Ted Kilmurray	Bill Mose (115)
1959	Premiers	20–3	Jack Sheedy	Jack Sheedy	Graham Farmer	Neil Hawke (119)
1960	R/Up	14–8–2	Jack Sheedy	Jack Sheedy	Graham Farmer	Kevin McGill (52)
1961	R/Up	20–3	Jack Sheedy	Jack Sheedy	Graham Farmer	Ralph Rogerson (51)
1962	5th	11–10	Jack Sheedy	Jack Sheedy; Ted Kilmurray	Don Marinko	Karl Bearman (48)
1963	4th	13–9	Jack Sheedy	Don Marinko	Derek Chadwick	Karl Bearman (42)
1964	8th (Wooden Spoon)	3–18	Jack Sheedy	Mal Atwell	Derek Chadwick	Ted Kilmurray (25)
1965	6th	10–11	Kevin Murray	Kevin Murray	Kevin Murray	Phil Tierney (55)
1966	R/Up	16–8	Kevin Murray	Kevin Murray	Syd Jackson	Keith Doncon (50)
1967	R/Up	18–6	Derek Chadwick	Derek Chadwick	Hans Verstegen	Phil Tierney (119)
1968	R/Up	15–9	Derek Chadwick	Derek Chadwick	Jim Haines	Phil Tierney (106)
1969	R/Up	18–5–1	Jack Sheedy	Derek Chadwick	Mal Brown	Phil Tierney (74)
1970	3rd	13–10	Mal Brown	Mal Brown	Mal Brown	Gary Bygraves (56)
1971	R/Up	18–5	Mal Brown	Mal Brown	Ken McAullay	Phil Tierney (105)
1972	Premiers	17–6	Mal Brown	Mal Brown	Mal Brown	Mal Brown (51)
1973	3rd	15–8	Mal Brown	Mal Brown	Gary Malarkey	Archie Duda (71)
1974	6th	10–11	Ray Giblett	Hans Verstegen	Ron Alexander	Archie Duda (74)
1975	4th	13–9	Ray Giblett	Ron Alexander	Peter Spencer	Peter Spencer (34)
1976	R/Up	17–6	Graham Farmer	Brad Smith	Peter Spencer	Gary Bygraves (65)
1977	4th	13–9	Graham Farmer	Brad Smith	Stephen Curtis	Archie Duda (106)
1978	Premiers	15–9	Barry Cable	Barry Cable	Kevin Bryant	Archie Duda (76)
1979	4th	13–9	Barry Cable	Barry Cable	Phil Kelly	Paul Arnold (51)
1980	3rd	12–11	Barry Cable	Ian Miller	Wayne Otway, Sr.	Paul Arnold (76)
1981	4th	11–11	Grant Dorrington	John Hayes	Dean Turner	Grant Campbell (54)
1982	4th	13–9	Grant Dorrington	John Hayes	Stephen Curtis	Grant Campbell (76)
1983	5th	9–12	Greg Brehaut	John Dimmer	Peter Spencer	John Scott (67)
1984	4th	11–11	Greg Brehaut	Greg Walsh	Grant Campbell	John Scott (63)
1985	8th (Wooden Spoon)	5–16	Greg Brehaut	Kevin Bryant	Brett Stephens	Brett Stephens (69)
1986	6th	7–14	Greg Brehaut; Gerard McNeil	Kevin Bryant; Russel Sparks	Craig Starcevich	Richard Dennis (32)
1987	7th	4–17	Gerard McNeil	Chris Allen	George Giannakis	Grant Campbell (27)
1988	7th	5–16	Gerard McNeil	Glen Bartlett	David Bain	Grant Campbell (58)
1989	8th (Wooden Spoon)	3–18	Ian McCulloch	Glen Bartlett	George Giannakis	Glen Bartlett (41)
1990	5th	9–12	Ian McCulloch	Glen Bartlett	Lucio Baroni	Glen Bartlett (69)
1991	5th	10–12	Ian McCulloch	Glen Bartlett	Ryan Turnbull	Glen Bartlett (90)
1992	3rd	12–12	Stan Magro	Craig McGrath	Peter Miller	Paul Peos (38)
1993	7th	9–11–1	Stan Magro	Lucio Baroni	Ryan Turnbull	Paul Barnard (53)
1994	7th	6–15	Robert Solin	Lucio Baroni	Dean Talbot	Darren Williams (47)
1995	6th	10–11	Robert Solin	Stephen Hooper	Greg Jones	Scott Loving (36)
1996	R/Up	15–8	Kevin Worthington	Stephen Hooper	Paul Peos	Christopher Gerreyn (74)
1997	4th	12–8–1	Kevin Worthington	Paul Peos	Peter Miller	Scott Loving (56)
1998	4th	11–10	Kevin Worthington	Peter Miller	Aaron Marley	Wayne Otway, Jr. (31)
1999	8th	5–15	Kevin Worthington	Greg Jones	Ryan Turnbull	Jeremy Barnard (21)
2000	Premiers	17–3	Tony Micale	Jeremy Barnard	Aaron Marley; David Swan; Rod Wheatley	Ashley Hutchinson (51)
2001	Premiers	16–4	Tony Micale	Jeremy Barnard	Rod Wheatley	Dean Buszan (51)
2002	Premiers	15–5	Tony Micale	Jeremy Barnard; Ryan Turnbull; Rod Wheatley	Paul Ridley	Paul Ridley (54)
2003	3rd	14–7–1	Andy Lovell	Jeremy Barnard; Ryan Turnbull; Rod Wheatley	Brent Cowell	Paul Ridley (71)
2004	5th	11–9	Andy Lovell	Jeremy Barnard; Ryan Turnbull	Troy Wilson	Troy Wilson (54)
2005	6th	6–14	Warren Mahoney	Dean Brennan	Andrew Merrington	Andrew Merrington (51)
2006	5th	7–13	Warren Mahoney; Paul Peos	Michael Swan	Troy Wilson	Troy Wilson (74)
2007	4th	11–10	Glen Bewick	Michael Swan	Frank Agostino	Ben McKinley (46)
2008	9th (Wooden Spoon)	6–14	Glen Bewick	Michael Swan	Timothy Noakes	Andrew Merrington (44)
2009	5th	10–10	Tony Micale	Craig Glancy; Michael Swan; Luke Webster	Trevor Oliver	Mathew Seal (36)
2010	3rd	12–10	Tony Micale	Craig Glancy; Michael Swan; Luke Webster	Craig Wulff	Adam Prior (43)
2011	7th	6–14	Tony Micale; David Hynes	Michael Swan	Brendan Lee	Josh Smith (47)
2012	4th	11–9–1	Tony Micale	Michael Swan; Craig Wulff	Paul Johnson	Josh Smith (53)
2013	R/Up	14–9	Brian Dawson	Brendan Lee; Craig Wulff	Brendan Lee	Josh Smith (62)
2014	R/Up	17–5	Brian Dawson; Russell Thompson	Brendan Lee; Craig Wulff	Steven Payne	Josh Smith (41)
2015	3rd	13–10	Brian Dawson	Brendan Lee; Craig Wulff	Paul Johnson	Craig Wulff (23)
2016	5th	10–11	Jaymie Graham	Kyle Anderson; Craig Wulff	Mitchell Fraser	Jonathan Giles (22)
2017	6th	9–11	Luke Webster	Kyle Anderson; Patrick McGinnity	Julian Ameduri; Nathan Blee; Fraser McInnes	Tom Lamb (21)
2018	5th	8–11	Luke Webster	Kyle Anderson; Patrick McGinnity	Matthew Allen; Patrick McGinnity; Luke Partington	William Maginness (26)
2019	9th	5–13	Jeremy Barnard	Kyle Anderson; Patrick McGinnity	Jackson Ramsay	Mitchell Dobson (23)
2020	5th	4–4	Jeremy Barnard	Patrick McGinnity	Jackson Ramsay	Eddie Simpson (13)
2021	8th	6–12	Jeremy Barnard	Jackson Ramsay	Christian Ameduri	Eddie Simpson (29)
2022	8th	6–12	Jeremy Barnard; Ross McQueen	Jackson Ramsay	Hamish Brayshaw	Thomas Medhat (26)
2023	5th	12–7	Ross McQueen	Hamish Brayshaw; Christian Ameduri	Mitch Crowden	Mitchell Schofield (30)
2024	R/Up	15–5	Ross McQueen	Hamish Brayshaw; Christian Ameduri	Mitch Crowden	Thomas Medhat (27)
2025	R/Up	13–9	Ross McQueen	Hamish Brayshaw; Christian Ameduri	Scott Jones	Thomas Medhat; Sam Van Diemen; Sebit Kuek (25)

== League Championship Cup ==
In 2010 the Australian Football League (AFL) announced plans to start a knockout competition featuring the best teams from the state leagues around Australia. 16 Teams would qualify based on their finishing position in their corresponding state leagues the previous years. Originally games were played primarily as curtain raisers for AFL games on a Saturday night and broadcast live on Fox Footy. In 2013 the games shifted to Tuesday night and the tournament comprised only 10 teams. The competition is sponsored by Foxtel and is known as Foxtel Cup.

East Perth have qualified for the tournament twice. In the competitions first year, 2011, the Royals defeated North Ballarat and NT Thunder to reach the semi-final losing to eventual premiers Williamstown.

The Royals also gained qualification for the 2014 season. East Perth were big 50 point winners over Norwood in the quarter-final but once again fell in the semi-final to VFL side Williamstown who once again went on to win the title.

== See also ==
- Wikipedia listing of East Perth Football Club players
- Ugly Men's Association

== Notes ==
^{a} During the years 1942 to 1944 the WAFL operated as an under age competition
^{b} from 1925
^{c} from 1957
^{d} fourth grade competition ran from 1965 to 1974
