= Ted Kilmurray =

Personal information
- Full name: Edward Kilmurray
- Nickname: Square
- Born: 18 August 1934; Wiluna, Western Australia, Australia
- Died: 10 January 2025 (aged 90)
- Original team: Kenwick

Playing career^{1}
Years	Club	Games (Goals)
1953–1965	East Perth	257 (431)
- ^{1} Playing statistics correct to the end of 1965.

Edward "Square" Kilmurray (18 August 1934 – 10 January 2025) was an Australian rules footballer who played with East Perth in the West Australian National Football League between 1953 and 1966 for a total of 257 games.

A member of the Stolen Generations, Kilmurray was born in Wiluna but raised in the Sister Kate orphanage in Queens Park, where he met Graham 'Polly' Farmer. The two would go on to play senior football together for Kenwick as 15 year olds in the South Suburban Football Association, winning two premierships in 1949 and 1950. In 1951 Kenwick moved to the Saturday amateur league, with Kilmurray and Farmer continuing to play for Kenwick on Saturdays, as well as for Maddington on Sundays. They won a premiership with Maddington in 1952.

In 1953, Kilmurray and Farmer approached both the Perth and East Perth Football Clubs in the West Australian Football League, but were turned away by Perth for not being good enough.

Kilmurray was often used on the half forward flanks but also played as a key position forward and ruck-rover. He was a good exponent of the flick pass and won East Perth's Best and Fairest in 1958, breaking teammate Graham Farmer's sequence of four in a row. That year he also won a Sandover Medal as best player in the competition as voted for by the umpires. He was a three time premiership player with East Perth and represented Western Australia at interstate football on four occasions.

After retiring from WAFL football due to a knee injury, Kilmurray returned to Kenwick to both play and coach.

In 2005 Kilmurray was named on the interchange bench in the official Indigenous Team of the Century.

Kilmurray died on 10 January 2025, at the age of 90.
