= Prospect Hawks Football Club =

Prospect Hawks

Names
- Full name: Prospect Hawks Football Club

2015 (TSL) season
- After finals: 10°

Club details
- Founded: 2014; 11 years ago
- Colours
- Competition: Tasmanian State League
- President: Michelle Strickland
- Ground(s): Aurora Stadium

Uniforms
Home

The Prospect Hawks Football Club is an Australian rules football club which was a member of the Tasmanian State Football League (TSL) from 2014 until 2016. The club is based in Prospect, a Western suburb of Launceston. The club is a rebranding of Western Storm Football Club, the latter of which had competed stand alone in the TSL in 2014 and 2015, in partnership with the local Prospect Senior and Junior Football Clubs.

== Club details ==
Logo of the Western Storm F.C., used until 2014.

The Prospect Hawks Football Club represents the western side of Launceston and areas surrounded by the Great Western Tiers. The club was established as the Western Storm Football Club and entered the Tasmanian state league competition in 2014. The club replaced the South Launceston Football Club at the end of the 2013 season, with the latter exiting the competition due to not pursuing a further licence in the Tasmanian State League beyond the season, despite eventually winning the 2013 premiership. Regardless, the history making 2014 Western Storm list was made up of significant numbers of past premiership players joining the new franchise from South Launceston. Originally, former Hawthorn AFL player Mitch Thorp was selected as coach of the side, though he resigned prior to the 2014 season to become assistant-coach at SANFL club Glenelg.

After a disastrous season on and off the field in 2015, the club was rebranded in 2016 as the Prospect Hawks Football Club, in partnership with local senior and junior clubs in Prospect, to try to improve the club's connection to the western Launceston community. However, the club was unable to put together a competitive senior team, and withdrew from senior competition in 2016 with the intention of returning by 2018; it still fielded a team in the TSL reserves, but was highly uncompetitive. The club's TSL licence was terminated at the end of 2016.

=== Home stadium ===
During its time as the Western Storm, the club played all its home games at the Aurora Stadium in Launceston. As the Prospect Hawks, it split its games between Aurora Stadium and Prospect Park.

=== Training ground ===
The club is headquartered and trains at Prospect Vale Park in the Meander Valley Council region.

=== Guernsey ===
Former Western Storm guernsey, used until 2014.

The club guernsey home strip in 2014 was a predominantly dark grey with a significant lighter blue lightning strike sprawled across the front of the guernsey. The away strip was identical with respect to the same lightning strike though it is coloured in a predominantly white background. In the 2015, a new guernsey featured a more prominent impression of the Club's 'Thor' logo, and design combined the club's colours of grey, blue and white.

After relaunching as the Prospect Hawks, the club adopted a design of brown and gold vertical stripes, consistent with that of Australian Football League team Hawthorn.

== Results ==
=== State League ===
Season	Win–loss	Ladder	Finals	Captain(s)	Best & fairest
2014	13-5	2nd	Grand Final (Runner Up)	Jaye Blackberry	Matt Hanson
2015	2–16	10th	–	Jaye Blackberry	Matt Hanson
2016	Withdrew	–	–	–	–

=== Attendance records ===
Record Home Attendance – Tasmanian State League
● 1,500 v North Launceston on 3 May 2014 at Aurora Stadium

Record Finals Attendance – Tasmanian State League
● 5,842 v North Launceston on 21 September 2014 (2014 TSL Grand Final) at Aurora Stadium

=== Foxtel Cup ===
Despite only forming as a new club in late 2013, the Western Storm were granted an invitation to compete in the 2014 Foxtel Cup knockout competition ahead of 2013 runners-up Burnie due to its connections to 2013 premiers South Launceston. The Western Storm were the only Tasmanian club to win a preliminary game in the competition's history, and were knocked out in the Semi Final stage.

Game #1 29 April 2014; 20:05 CST	West Adelaide (South Australia)	57–61 stand alone game	(Tasmania) Western Storm	Adelaide Oval match report match statistics
	2.1 (13); 4.4 (28); 7.4 (46); 8.9 (57)	match report	4.2 (26); 7.4 (46); 9.6 (60); 9.7 (61)
		Goals
	Hopton 2, Watchman 2, Dijksman, Schott, De Zylva.		Collis 2, McCulloch 2, Brown, Thomas, McGee, Russell, Barker.
		Bests
	De Zylva, Jennings, Dijksman, Nelson.		Hanson, Hills, Blackberry, Reinmuth, McCulloch.

Semi Final #1 24 June 2014; 18:35 WST	Western Storm (Tasmania)	23–97 stand alone game	(Western Australia) West Perth	Patersons Stadium match report match statistics
	0.2 (2); 0.3 (3); 1.5 (11); 3.5 (23)	match report	3.3 (21); 7.5 (47); 11.6 (72); 15.7 (97)
		Goals
	A.Russell, W.Hanson, L.Barker		M.McPhee 3, S.Martin 3, M.Johnson 2 M.Guadagnin, K.Shannon, M.Crisp, B.Antonio, R.Bartholomew, T.Manzone, S.Marusic
		Bests
	J.Blackberry, M.Hanson, B.Thorp, T.Bardenhagen, J.Child		A.Lynch, J.Thrum, L.Meadows, S.Martin, B.Antonio, S.Marusic
