= Phil Matson =

Australian rules footballer and coach (1884–1928)

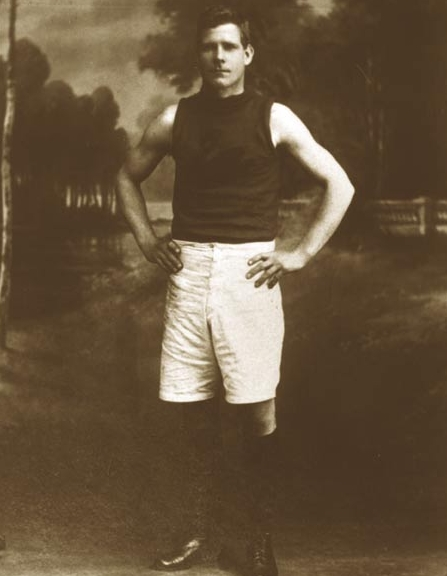
- Phil Matson circa 1923

Personal information
- Full name: Phillip Henry Matson
- Born: 22 October 1884; Port Adelaide, South Australia
- Died: 13 June 1928 (aged 43); Perth, Western Australia
- Height: 179 cm (5 ft 10 in)
- Position: Utility

Playing career^{1}
Years	Club	Games (Goals)
1904	West Perth	1 (0)
1904–05	South Bunbury	
1906–08	Boulder City	
1909–10	Sturt	24 (13)
1911	North Fremantle	13
1912–17	Subiaco	79 (70)
1918–23	East Perth	35 (35)

Representative team honours^{2}
Years	Team	Games (Goals)
1908, 1911, 1914	Western Australia	10
1909–10	South Australia	4
Total		14

Coaching career^{3}
Years	Club	Games (W–L–D)
1913–14	Subiaco	
1918–24, 1926–28	East Perth	
1923, 1926–27	Western Australia	
1925	Castlemaine	
- ^{1} Playing statistics correct to the end of 1923.^{2} Representative statistics correct as of 1914.^{3} Coaching statistics correct as of 1928.

Career highlights
- Player: 1x South Bunbury premiership player (1904); 2x Boulder City premiership player (1907, 1908); 3x Subiaco premiership player (1912, 1913, 1915); 5x East Perth premiership player (1919, 1920, 1921, 1922, 1923); Coach: 1x Subiaco premiership coach (1913); 7x East Perth premiership coach (1919, 1920, 1921, 1922, 1923, 1926, 1927); 1x Castlemaine Grand Final losing coach (1925); Honours: Subiaco "Team of the Century"; East Perth (1906-1944) "Team of the Century"; Australian Football Hall of Fame; WAFL Hall of Fame

Phillip Henry Matson (22 October 1884 – 13 June 1928) was a record-breaking swimmer, as well as a highly successful player and coach of Australian rules football in the early 20th century in Western Australia.

== Family ==
Phillip Henry Matson was born in Port Adelaide on 22 October 1884 to George Thomas Matson (1842–1915) and Emma Matson (1854–1928), née Duffield.

Matson was educated at a state school in Adelaide before moving to Western Australia as a youth.

== Lifestyle ==
Outside of football, Matson's work was varied and somewhat inconsistent. He had jobs as a miner, a tramway motorman, a farmer, a navvy on the Trans-Australian Railway, a lumper, a store clerk, and a 'Spot-Lager' retailer.

Early in his career, Matson was a teetotaler but eventually became a "social" drinker and was well-known for his gambling habit. His approach to life caused problems within his family, who, as a result, occasionally lived in tents and moved houses several times.

Matson offered to enlist during World War I. When rejected, he opted to live as a licensed Swan River fisherman and engaged more heavily in gambling. He operated two-up schools at Subiaco and Pelican Point, SP books in some city hotels, and an illegal gaming house in Perth. For a number of years, he held a trotting bookmaker's licence.

== Swimming career ==
Matson worked as a navvies' water-boy in Western Australia, and began swimming competitively in 1902.

He had been encouraged to take up football by his swimming trainer, William Howson (who set a world record in 1904 in 110 yards underwater swimming), in order to "harden himself" for his swimming.

During his swimming career, Matson held the Western Australian freestyle titles from 100 yards (91 m) to a mile (1.6 km) using the now-obsolete trudgen stroke. He won the 220-yard breaststroke at the Australasian championships for three consecutive years (1905–1907).

On 19 February 1908, Matson participated in the West Australian Amateur Swimming Association's Australian Championship in Claremont, Western Australia, where he set a world record time for the 220-yard breaststroke (3 minutes and 14 seconds), winning by a length (having touched equal first at the last turn).

Seven days later, on 26 February 1908, Matson was swimming at a swimming carnival in Kalgoorlie when he broke his own world record by another 3.4 seconds, swimming 220 yards in 3 minutes and 10.6 seconds. However, because a surveyor's certificate could not be produced to precisely verified the pool's dimensions (i.e. the exact length of the swim), the governing body, the New South Wales Amateur Swimming Association, refused to ratify the new record.

Meanwhile, Matson's football career prevented him from being considered for the Olympic Games in swimming. He therefore turned professional for a £20 stake in 1909.

== Football career ==
"[Matson] himself was a wonderful footballer. His name has been bracketed with that of the late Albert Thurgood as the best player of all time. Grim, relentless, shrewd, strong as a lion, courageous and trier from start to finish, Matson was a great figure on the field." — The Sporting Globe, 20 July 1928.

"All up, Matson played and/or coached nine clubs and was involved in 13 premiership (five as a player, four as player/coach and four as coach) and four runner-up teams in 25 completed seasons." — Peter Carter.

Matson played at half-back and half-forward and took turns in the ruck. He played for both South Australia (1909–10) and Western Australia (1908, 1911, 1914) and captained the South Australian team at the 1914 interstate carnival.

MR. MOFFAT'S TRIBUTE

Yeoman Services to Game
"I exceedingly regret to learn of Phil Matson's death", said Mr. A.A. Moffatt,
president of the W.A. Football League and of the Australian Football Council,
this morning. "League football has been deprived of one whose loss will be
difficult to replace. Western Australia has had many fine exponents of Australian
football. With the exception of the late A.J. Thurgood, I cannot recall to mind
another player whom I would place in front of the late Phil Matson as the finest
footballer who has thrilled the public of our State. No position on the field would
find him misplaced. At all times the ball was his objective, not the man. His
judgment was uncanny, and once he placed his hand on the ball it was gripped
as if in a vice. His aerial flights were spectacular and thrilling, and being
possessed of exceptional football brains, the results of his play were often
confounding to opposing teams.
"Apart from his qualities on the field, he was an outstanding judge of
players, and as a tactician was not surpassed. Over a period of very many
years Phil Matson had rendered yeoman service as a player to the clubs with
which he had been associated on the goldfields and in the metropolitan area.
To his adopted State of Western Australia he gave of his best, and as a
representative in the carnival games, in which he participated, was always one
of the outstanding players. The Sturt Club and the South Australian public had
many appreciative opinions of his exceptional ability as a player during the time
he played in that State.
GREATEST COACH OF ALL.
"On his retirement from the playing fields he became celebrated as a coach,
not only to his club, but to State and carnival teams. In this he was equally as
successful as he had been as a player, and in my opinion was the greatest
coach the Australian game has known, not excepting even the famed Colling-
wood mentor, Jim M'Hale. Players and others associated with the game will
fully realise the great loss his death means and the difficult gap thereby created.
With the players Phil Matson seemed to be a super-coach, having a personality
which enabled him to extract from those he was handling the best that was
within them. His pre-match and half-time addresses were of such a nature that
players and others privileged to hear them became inspired with the sound
advice he tendered. Words were never wasted, and he always, succeeded in
striking the target at the right spot.
"The record of successes achieved by him will be a lasting memorial to
his greatness, and, in conjunction with many, others, I deeply deplore the
untimely severance of his connection with the national game in which he
was such an outstanding personality."
The Daily News, 14 June 1928.

=== Professional football career ===
Matson supported himself by playing football, despite it being considered an amateur sport at the time. He moved clubs frequently, playing outside the main leagues if the price was right. Across 20 seasons, Matson played for:

- South Bunbury Football Club (Western Australia): 1904–1905.
- Boulder City Football Club (Western Australia): 1906–1908.
- Sturt (South Australia): 1909–1910.
- North Fremantle Football Club (Western Australia): 1911.
- Subiaco Football Club (Western Australia): 1912–1917.
- East Perth Football Club (Western Australia): 1918–1923.

== Coaching career ==
=== East Perth ===
Aged 33, Matson was appointed as the coach of East Perth Football Club in 1918. Matson worked on the players' confidence and earned their respect with a methodical approach to his coaching. He was praised for his ability to outwit opponents and exploit weaknesses. Matson's personality helped recruit some top players. In nine seasons between 1919 and 1927, East Perth won seven premierships. In total, he played in twelve premiership teams and, in the last ten years of his career, coached teams into nine finals.

=== WAFL ===
He was an essential part of the state team, as he both selected the successful 1921 Western Australian interstate carnival team and coached the 1924 and 1927 teams that narrowly lost to Victoria. In 1924, he openly criticised Victorian officials for encouraging violence against his team.

=== Castlemaine (BFL) ===
In 1925, Matson accepted an offer to coach the Castlemaine Football Club in the club's first year in the Bendigo Football League. He was cleared to be both a player (he played in 2 or 3 games) and a coach to Castlemaine in April 1925.

With Matson's coaching, Castlemaine made the 1925 Grand Final, but lost to South Bendigo by 14 Points: 7.12 (54) to 6.4 (40).

=== Richmond (VFL) ===
Impressed with his effort in lifting the Castlemaine into the Grand Final, Richmond officials approached Matson with an offer to succeed Dan Minogue as the Tigers' coach for 1926. Matson accepted and relocated to Melbourne.

However, the Victorian Football League (VFL) refused Matson a permit to take up the job, which annoyed both the club and the prospective coach. It was suggested that either the VFL officials had not forgotten Matson's criticism of them two years earlier, or that they disapproved of his "unconventional" lifestyle.

=== Western Australia ===
Matson returned to Perth in time for the football season, and was re-appointed as the coach of East Perth. He took them to successive premierships. Matson's dispute with VFL officials inspired Western Australia to two "spiteful, vicious, brutal" victories over Victoria in 1926.

== Death ==
On 11 June 1928, Matson and his former team-mate Horrie Bant careered off the Hampden Road in Nedlands. The truck, driven by Bant, crashed through a bush and collided with a post carrying overhead tram wires, resulting in both men being thrown from the vehicle. Although injured, Bant survived the crash. Matson, however, struck the post with his head and subsequently died on 13 June 1928 from a fractured skull.

He was survived by his former wife, their two sons (Glenn and Cliff), and his de facto wife, Catherine Thompson, née Owens, and was buried at Karrakatta Cemetery on 15 June 1928.

== Legacy ==
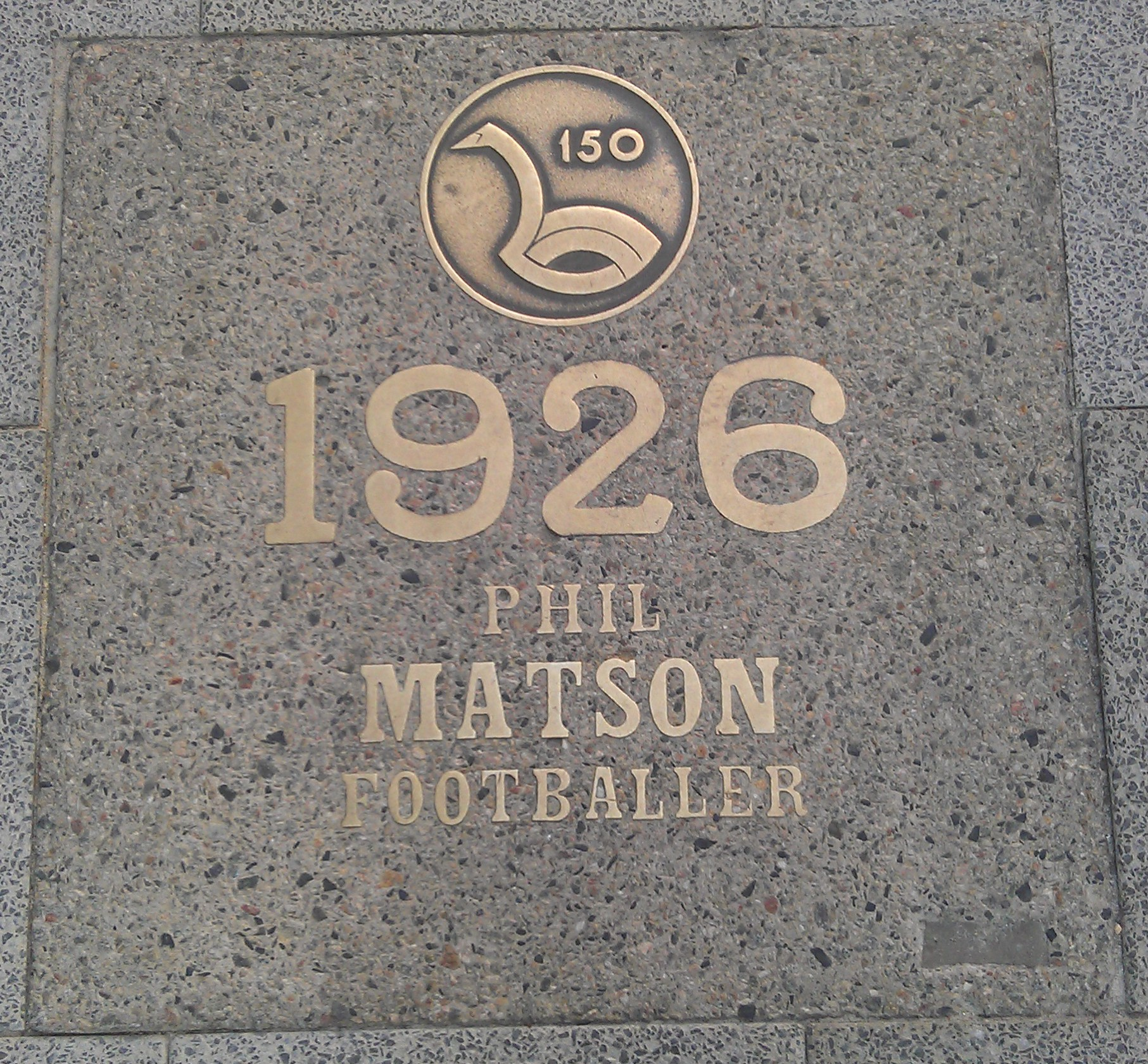
Matson's paver on St Georges Terrace, Perth

He played an important role in the process of making Australian football professional by openly negotiating fees that made him the highest paid Western Australian player and coach of the time. He has been awarded several posthumous awards, including:

- He was selected as centre half-forward in Subiaco's "Team of the Century".
- He was selected as coach of East Perth's (1906–1944) "Team of the Century".
- In 1979, he was honoured with the bronze tablet for 1926, set into the footpath along St Georges Terrace, Perth, as part of the WAY '79 150th anniversary celebrations of the colonisation of Western Australia by Europeans.
- In 1986, Matson was inducted into the Western Australian Institute of Sport's "Western Australian Hall of Champions".
- In 2004, he was an inaugural inductee into the West Australian Football Hall of Fame. He was elevated to legend status in 2011.
- Inducted into the coaching division of the Australian Football Hall of Fame in 2004, Matson's position in Western Australian football was compared to Collingwood's Jock McHale in Victoria.

== See also ==
- 1908 Melbourne Carnival
- 1911 Adelaide Carnival
- 1914 Sydney Carnival
- 1924 Hobart Carnival
- 1927 Melbourne Carnival
- Australian Football Hall of Fame
- West Australian Football Hall of Fame
- Western Australian Hall of Champions

== General references ==
- Glossop, Matthew (ed), East Perth 1906–1976, Matthew Glossop, (Perth), 1976.
- Hunt, Lyall, "Matson, Phillip Henry (1884–1928)", Australian Dictionary of Biography, Volume 10, 1986.
- Stannage, Charles Thomas, ed. (1981). A New History of Western Australia. Nedlands: UWA Publishing. ISBN 0-85564-181-9. LCCN 82101009. OCLC 963830667. OL 3517729M. Wikidata Q125995168.
- Western Australian National Football League, Football 150, Promotional Graphics, (Perth), 1979.
