= Frank Sparrow =

Australian rules footballer and coach

Personal information
- Full name: Francis Valentine Sparrow
- Born: 1 July 1927
- Died: 31 December 2000 (aged 73)
- Position: Centreman/Half back

Playing career^{1}
Years	Club	Games (Goals)
1943–1952	East Perth	126 (26)
1953–1955	Swan Districts	51 (15)
1956	West Perth	6 (3)
Total		183 (44)
- ^{1} Playing statistics correct to the end of 1956.

Career highlights
- 2× F.D. Book Medal: (1948, 1952); Swan Medal: (1953); All-Australian team: (1953); West Australian Football Hall of Fame, inducted 2004

Francis Valentine Sparrow (1 July 1927 – 31 December 2000) was an Australian rules footballer who played for the East Perth Football Club, Swan Districts Football Club and the West Perth Football Club in the West Australian National Football League (WANFL).

A champion midfielder and leader during his playing days, Sparrow became known to later generations for his role in football media. He was also a talented cricketer.

The son of fellow West Australian Football Hall of Famer Val Sparrow, he spent most of his career either as a centreman or across half back. He started his career at his father's club, East Perth in 1943 during the underage period (due to the war, and won the F. D. Book Medal for their fairest and best in 1948 and 1952. He captained East Perth in 1951 and the following season finished second in the Sandover Medal count.

Swan Districts acquired his services in 1953, as captain-coach, and he won their fairest and best in his first season. He remained in the role for a further two years before crossing to West Perth for one final season, also as captain-coach. In 1957 he retired as a player but remained West Perth's coach, leading them to the final, before joining the media and becoming one of Western Australia's best known football commentator on both television and radio.

A regular interstate representative, Sparrow played 17 games for Western Australia, most notably in 1951 when he was appointed captain and at the 1953 Adelaide Carnival where he achieved All-Australian selection.
