= Tony Micale =

Australian rules footballer and coach

Personal information
- Full name: Anthony Claude Micale
- Born: 22 November 1948 (age 77); Perth, Western Australia
- Original team: South Fremantle juniors

Playing career^{1}
Years	Club	Games (Goals)
1967–70	South Fremantle	16 (12)
1973–78	East Fremantle	58 (37)
Total		74 (49)

Coaching career^{3}
Years	Club	Games (W–L–D)
1997–98	East Fremantle	44 (34–10–0)
1999	South Fremantle	22 (19–3–0)
2000–02	East Perth	60 (48–12–0)
2009–11	East Perth	62 (28–34–0)
Total		188 (129–59–0)
- ^{1} Playing statistics correct to the end of 1978.^{3} Coaching statistics correct as of 2011.

Career highlights
- East Fremantle premiership player 1974; East Fremantle premiership coach 1998; East Perth premiership coach 2000, 2001, 2002

Anthony Claude "Tony" Micale (born 22 November 1948) is an Australian rules football coach and former player. He is the current coach of the East Perth Football Club. Micale played for the South Fremantle and East Fremantle Football Clubs in the West Australian Football League (WAFL), and later took up coaching. He also occasionally works as a special comments radio commentator for football matches broadcast on 6PR.

== Career ==
After playing 16 games for South Fremantle in the WAFL between 1967 and 1970, Micale moved to East Fremantle where he played from 1973 to 1976 and again in 1978, playing in the side's premiership victory in 1974.

Micale coached East Fremantle from 1997 to 1998, including the side's premiership win in 1998. He coached South Fremantle to a grand final in 1999 before being recruited by East Perth, which he took to three consecutive premierships, in 2000, 2001 and 2002. He served as an assistant coach of the West Coast Eagles in the Australian Football League (AFL) from 2003 to 2008, and was named as "AFL Assistant Coach of the Year" in 2007. He was dropped from the role at the end of the 2008 season. Micale was re-appointed coach of East Perth for the 2009 season, replacing Glen Bewick. In April 2011, Micale stepped down from his role as coach of East Perth after the death of his son, Josh, from a brain aneurysm, but returned the following week.
