= 1977 WANFL season =

Australian rules football season

- Teams: 8
- Premiers: Perth; 7th premiership
- Minor premiers: Perth; 6th minor premiership
- Sandover Medallist: Brian Peake (East Fremantle)
- Leading goalkicker: Ray Bauskis (South Fremantle)
- Matches played: 88

The 1977 WANFL season was the 93rd season of the Western Australian National Football League in its various incarnations. It followed on from the previous season's high scoring to set another record for the highest average score in WANFL history at 109.57 points per team per game, which was to be broken substantially in the following few years due to the introduction of the interchange rule allowing for a faster game with less exhausted players. 1977 was in fact that last WA(N)FL season with no score of over 200 points until 1988.

The season saw Perth win their second consecutive premiership with a resounding win and record WA(N)FL Grand Final score over East Fremantle who were in the finals for the first time since their last premiership in 1974. It was the fifth premiership in twelve seasons for the Demons, and their last as of 2022: Perth have not played in a Grand Final since 1978, and did even not qualify for the finals between 1998 and 2019.

To counter the uneven quality of inter-league matches between the WANFL and the VFL due to recruiting of top interstate players by Victoria, a State of Origin match was held in Perth the week following the Grand Final. Western Australia showed its quality as a developer of Australian Rules talent with a crushing 94-point win over the best players bred in Victoria. Until the advent of the national competition and the West Coast Eagles, State of Origin football proved very popular with Western Australian and South Australian crowds and with television in Victoria. However, after that it declined to the point of being abandoned after 1999.

== Home-and-away season ==
=== Round 1 (Easter weekend) ===
	Round 1
Saturday, 26 March	Swan Districts 25.13 (163)	def.	South Fremantle 18.18 (126)	Bassendean Oval (crowd: 10280)
Saturday, 26 March	East Perth 12.13 (85)	def. by	West Perth 15.14 (104)	Perth Oval (crowd: 12682)
Monday, 28 March	Claremont 8.12 (60)	def. by	Perth 12.15 (87)	Claremont Oval (crowd: not disclosed)
Monday, 28 March	East Fremantle 21.17 (143)	def.	Subiaco 13.12 (90)	East Fremantle Oval (crowd: not disclosed)
Swan Districts' off-season emphasis on physical conditioning has a surprise reward when – with Garry Sidebottom moved onto the ball – they overpower the 1976 second semi-finalists.; Despite the unexpected return of Peter Featherby, 12 goals and five behind from youngster Jim Sewell allows Old Easts to run over the Lions in amazing fashion with 13.7 (85) in the last quarter.

=== Round 2 ===
	Round 2
Saturday, 2 April	West Perth 15.22 (112)	def.	Swan Districts 14.10 (94)	Leederville Oval (crowd: 11560)
Saturday, 2 April	South Fremantle 14.13 (97)	def. by	East Perth 15.14 (104)	Fremantle Oval (crowd: 9485)
Saturday, 2 April	Subiaco 13.13 (91)	def. by	Claremont 14.12 (96)	Subiaco Oval (crowd: 7347)
Saturday, 2 April	Perth 13.11 (89)	def. by	East Fremantle 20.17 (137)	Lathlain Park (crowd: 10128)
Two brilliant bursts of goalkicking by David Hollins and Bruce Tschirpig give East Fremantle an impressive upset over the reigning premiers.; Basil Campbell single-handedly pushed South Fremantle close to East Perth when he misses a shot that would have levelled the scores after the Bulldogs were behind all match. Archie Duda kicks nine for the Royals.

=== Round 3 ===
	Round 3
Saturday, 9 April	Subiaco 15.12 (102)	def. by	Perth 19.17 (131)	Subiaco Oval (crowd: 8973)
Saturday, 9 April	Claremont 18.11 (119)	def. by	East Fremantle 27.14 (176)	Claremont Oval (crowd: 10050)
Monday, 11 April	South Fremantle 16.11 (107)	def.	West Perth 15.14 (104)	Fremantle Oval (crowd: 12601)
Monday, 11 April	Swan Districts 16.11 (107)	def. by	East Perth 22.12 (144)	Bassendean Oval (crowd: not disclosed)
Jim Sewell's second twelve-goal performance has him seen as potentially the biggest spectator drawcard in the WANFL since Gerovich – a critical asset when WANFL crowds were no longer increasing as they had been during the 1950s and 1960s.; South Fremantle show tenacity and skill to hold off a West Perth team that finished very strongly against the wind.

=== Round 4 ===
	Round 4
Saturday, 16 April	West Perth 18.21 (129)	def.	Subiaco 12.9 (81)	Leederville Oval (crowd: 9418)
Saturday, 16 April	Perth 30.18 (198)	def.	South Fremantle 13.7 (85)	Lathlain Park (crowd: 10402)
Saturday, 16 April	East Perth 21.15 (141)	def.	Claremont 11.14 (80)	Perth Oval (crowd: 9507)
Saturday, 16 April	East Fremantle 20.21 (141)	def.	Swan Districts 11.14 (80)	East Fremantle Oval (crowd: 9017)
A record third quarter of 15.3 (93) sees Perth kick their highest-ever WA(N)FL score, beating their previous record from 1968 against Swan Districts. The Demon rovers create a "shuttle service" to nine-goal full-forward Couper. South were without Campbell and Mal Brown.

=== Round 5 ===
	Round 5
Saturday, 23 April	Subiaco 9.12 (66)	def. by	South Fremantle 24.22 (166)	Subiaco Oval (crowd: 6907)
Saturday, 23 April	West Perth 9.15 (69)	def.	Perth 8.18 (66)	Leederville Oval (crowd: 12019)
Saturday, 23 April	Swan Districts 24.14 (158)	def.	Claremont 17.9 (111)	Bassendean Oval (crowd: 7058)
Saturday, 23 April	East Fremantle 12.22 (94)	def.	East Perth 12.16 (88)	East Fremantle Oval (crowd: 12723)
Despite losing a tight game to West Perth, Perth find future Simpson Medallist Wim Rosbender as the replacement they needed for 1976 premiership ruckman Dean Herbert, who returned to Victoria.; Swan Districts, after an expensive over-summer recruiting campaign, win their second game but it would be their last for sixteen weeks.

=== Round 6 ===
	Round 6
Saturday, 30 April	Perth 27.16 (178)	def.	Swan Districts 15.6 (96)	Lathlain Park (crowd: 8988)
Saturday, 30 April	East Perth 11.8 (74)	def. by	Subiaco 12.6 (78)	Perth Oval (crowd: 6546)
Saturday, 30 April	Claremont 8.12 (60)	def. by	West Perth 24.17 (161)	Claremont Oval (crowd: 7766)
Saturday, 30 April	South Fremantle 12.16 (88)	def. by	East Fremantle 19.18 (132)	Fremantle Oval (crowd: 15738)
Subiaco, after being wooden spooners in 1976 and losing their first five by large margins, has coach Brian Douge allow the players to select their own side and let them off training – this unorthodox move wins the Lions their first game and sets them on their best run between 1975 and 1984.

=== Round 7 ===
	Round 7
Saturday, 7 May	Swan Districts 10.10 (70)	def. by	Subiaco 18.9 (117)	Bassendean Oval (crowd: 6695)
Saturday, 7 May	East Perth 13.9 (87)	def. by	Perth 17.13 (115)	Perth Oval (crowd: 11213)
Saturday, 7 May	Claremont 14.9 (93)	def. by	South Fremantle 16.20 (116)	Claremont Oval (crowd: 6715)
Saturday, 7 May	East Fremantle 11.20 (86)	def. by	West Perth 21.8 (134)	East Fremantle Oval (crowd: 14948)
West Perth's win against East Fremantle was the biggest in the WAFL with fewer scoring shots until the same round of 1994 beating a record from the 1969 Preliminary Final.

=== Round 8 ===
	Round 8
Saturday, 14 May	South Fremantle 25.21 (171)	def.	Swan Districts 7.7 (49)	Fremantle Oval (crowd: 6697)
Saturday, 14 May	West Perth 14.15 (99)	def. by	East Perth 23.13 (151)	Leederville Oval (crowd: 11859)
Saturday, 14 May	Perth 23.15 (153)	def.	Claremont 11.16 (82)	Lathlain Park (crowd: 5782)
Saturday, 14 May	Subiaco 14.13 (97)	def. by	East Fremantle 17.12 (114)	Subiaco Oval (crowd: 7943)
South Fremantle in a tricky wind kick 1.12 (18) before kicking ten goals straight and crushing Swan Districts

=== Round 9 ===
	Round 9
Saturday, 21 May	Swan Districts 10.12 (72)	def. by	West Perth 17.15 (117)	Bassendean Oval (crowd: 6250)
Saturday, 21 May	East Perth 12.12 (84)	def. by	South Fremantle 19.18 (132)	Perth Oval (crowd: 9412)
Saturday, 21 May	Claremont 13.12 (90)	def. by	Subiaco 17.12 (114)	Claremont Oval (crowd: 4860)
Saturday, 21 May	East Fremantle 9.14 (68)	def. by	Perth 11.12 (78)	East Fremantle Oval (crowd: 8642)
On the one wet day of the season, South Fremantle kick an exceptional 10.3 (63) with the wind, with future star Stephen Michael dominating the ruck

=== Round 10 ===
	Round 10
Saturday, 28 May	West Perth 26.13 (169)	def.	South Fremantle 20.17 (137)	Leederville Oval (crowd: 14270)
Saturday, 28 May	East Perth 22.17 (149)	def.	Swan Districts 13.5 (83)	Perth Oval (crowd: 7038)
Saturday, 28 May	Perth 17.15 (117)	def.	Subiaco 11.12 (78)	Lathlain Park (crowd: 9106)
Saturday, 28 May	East Fremantle 13.9 (87)	def. by	Claremont 12.17 (89)	East Fremantle Oval (crowd: 6619)
The Cardinals won a high-scoring game with a brilliant fifteen-minute spell before half-time; When Ray Bauskis got his 100th goal in Round 19, a goal was added over those originally credited from this round; Robert Wiley has 36 kicks and five goals in a display that attracts the attention of Richmond

=== Round 11 (Foundation Day) ===
	Round 11
Saturday, 4 June	Claremont 11.12 (78)	def. by	East Perth 15.16 (106)	Claremont Oval (crowd: 9026)
Saturday, 4 June	Swan Districts 14.14 (98)	def. by	East Fremantle 20.27 (147)	Bassendean Oval (crowd: 7340)
Monday, 6 June	Subiaco 17.13 (115)	def.	West Perth 14.7 (91)	Subiaco Oval (crowd: 12311)
Monday, 6 June	South Fremantle 19.17 (131)	def.	Perth 18.12 (120)	Fremantle Oval (crowd: 11687)

=== Round 12 ===
	Round 12
Saturday, 11 June	South Fremantle 16.16 (112)	def. by	Subiaco 19.14 (128)	Fremantle Oval (crowd: 8923)
Saturday, 11 June	Perth 29.18 (192)	def.	West Perth 12.8 (80)	Lathlain Park (crowd: 8198)
Saturday, 11 June	Claremont 13.25 (103)	def.	Swan Districts 10.8 (68)	Claremont Oval (crowd: 5044)
Saturday, 11 June	East Perth 19.13 (127)	def.	East Fremantle 14.16 (100)	Perth Oval (crowd: 9041)
Star Perth rover Robert Wiley has an amazing match with 10 goals, four behinds and forty-two possessions, as the Demons kick their second highest score on record.

=== Round 13 ===
	Round 13
Saturday, 18 June	Swan Districts 9.9 (63)	def. by	Perth 18.15 (123)	Bassendean Oval (crowd: 4897)
Saturday, 18 June	Subiaco 12.11 (83)	def. by	East Perth 17.15 (117)	Subiaco Oval (crowd: 12757)
Saturday, 18 June	West Perth 16.12 (108)	def.	Claremont 17.18 (120)	Leederville Oval (crowd: 7113)
Saturday, 18 June	East Fremantle 11.17 (83)	def. by	South Fremantle 11.19 (85)	East Fremantle Oval (crowd: 11940)
Don Haddow kicks winner with last kick of day on best-afield Doug Green, in a manner compared at the time with the 1964 Grand Final.

=== Round 14 ===
	Round 14
Saturday, 2 July	Subiaco 14.13 (97)	def.	Swan Districts 12.12 (84)	Subiaco Oval (crowd: 6976)
Saturday, 2 July	Perth 29.12 (186)	def.	East Perth 11.8 (74)	Lathlain Park (crowd: 10490)
Saturday, 2 July	South Fremantle 24.16 (160)	def.	Claremont 13.14 (92)	Fremantle Oval (crowd: 7857)
Saturday, 2 July	West Perth 19.12 (126)	def.	East Fremantle 16.12 (108)	Leederville Oval (crowd: 8472)

=== Round 15 ===
	Round 15
Saturday, 9 July	Swan Districts 12.10 (82)	def. by	South Fremantle 21.16 (142)	Bassendean Oval (crowd: 5488)
Saturday, 9 July	East Perth 20.9 (129)	def.	West Perth 13.11 (89)	Perth Oval (crowd: 12491)
Saturday, 9 July	Claremont 9.18 (72)	def. by	Perth 26.14 (170)	Claremont Oval (crowd: 5202)
Saturday, 9 July	East Fremantle 21.25 (151)	def.	Subiaco 13.11 (89)	East Fremantle Oval (crowd: 8090)
Robert Wiley kicks nine goals after half-time for his second double-figure haul of the season; Bold moves by Graham Farmer help East Perth cope with the loss of spearhead Archie Duda to defeat rivals West Perth

=== Round 16 ===
	Round 16
Saturday, 16 July	West Perth 29.23 (197)	def.	Swan Districts 16.12 (108)	Leederville Oval (crowd: 6109)
Saturday, 16 July	South Fremantle 12.10 (82)	def. by	East Perth 17.17 (119)	Fremantle Oval (crowd: 11517)
Saturday, 16 July	Subiaco 16.17 (113)	def.	Claremont 15.9 (99)	Subiaco Oval (crowd: 4406)
Saturday, 16 July	Perth 17.17 (119)	def. by	East Fremantle 20.12 (132)	Lathlain Park (crowd: 11420)

=== Round 17 ===
	Round 17
Saturday, 23 July	South Fremantle 11.13 (79)	def. by	West Perth 15.20 (110)	Fremantle Oval (crowd: 11478)
Saturday, 23 July	Swan Districts 12.9 (81)	def. by	East Perth 23.11 (149)	Bassendean Oval (crowd: 5698)
Saturday, 23 July	Subiaco 11.9 (75)	def. by	Perth 23.11 (149)	Subiaco Oval (crowd: 5867)
Saturday, 23 July	Claremont 9.14 (68)	def. by	East Fremantle 16.13 (109)	Claremont Oval (crowd: 5750)
Archie Duda kicked ten in comeback from knee trouble to move to 99 goals for the Royals.

=== Round 18 ===
	Round 18
Saturday, 6 August	West Perth 25.17 (167)	def.	Subiaco 18.5 (113)	Leederville Oval (crowd: 7816)
Saturday, 6 August	Perth 15.14 (104)	def.	South Fremantle 15.9 (99)	Lathlain Park (crowd: 9109)
Saturday, 6 August	East Perth 20.15 (135)	def. by	Claremont 23.9 (147)	Perth Oval (crowd: 6618)
Saturday, 6 August	East Fremantle 27.17 (179)	def.	Swan Districts 18.9 (117)	East Fremantle Oval (crowd: 5127)
Peter Bosustow, then only a fringe player for Perth, kicks six to help them overhaul South Fremantle from a big quarter-time deficit; Archie Duda kicked his hundredth goal for East Perth, but missed the rest of the season with persistent knee problems.

=== Round 19 ===
	Round 19
Saturday, 13 August	Subiaco 10.9 (69)	def. by	South Fremantle 23.15 (153)	Subiaco Oval (crowd: 4317)
Saturday, 13 August	West Perth 23.16 (154)	def.	Perth 14.15 (99)	Leederville Oval (crowd: 11380)
Saturday, 13 August	Swan Districts 13.16 (94)	def. by	Claremont 19.13 (127)	Bassendean Oval (crowd: 4102)
Saturday, 13 August	East Fremantle 16.16 (112)	def.	East Perth 17.9 (111)	East Fremantle Oval (crowd: 9012)
Old Easts wipe off a 44-point deficit in fifteen minutes of the third quarter and hang on to win a thriller

=== Round 20 ===
	Round 20
Saturday, 20 August	Perth 17.18 (120)	def.	Swan Districts 12.12 (84)	Lathlain Park (crowd: 4132)
Saturday, 20 August	East Perth 15.15 (105)	def.	Subiaco 8.4 (52)	Perth Oval (crowd: 6145)
Saturday, 20 August	Claremont 10.6 (66)	def. by	West Perth 22.13 (145)	Claremont Oval (crowd: 6840)
Saturday, 20 August	South Fremantle 15.17 (107)	def.	East Fremantle 14.13 (97)	Fremantle Oval (crowd: 12984)
Ross Glendinning's brilliant defence allows East Perth to hold Subiaco to 2.0 (12) in first half.

=== Round 21 ===
	Round 21
Saturday, 27 August	Swan Districts 16.17 (113)	def.	Subiaco 7.11 (53)	Bassendean Oval (crowd: 3048)
Saturday, 27 August	East Perth 26.19 (175)	def.	Perth 9.7 (61)	Perth Oval (crowd: 11695)
Saturday, 27 August	Claremont 11.17 (83)	def. by	South Fremantle 13.17 (95)	Claremont Oval (crowd: 6375)
Saturday, 27 August	East Fremantle 23.12 (150)	def.	West Perth 10.18 (78)	East Fremantle Oval (crowd: 11740)
East Perth, with fierce physical pressure and brilliant roving from Otway against a Wiley-less Demon side, take complete revenge for their earlier caning.; Garry Sidebottom kicks eight as Swan Districts end a run of fifteen straight losses, to be thirty losses from thirty-two games next season. Sidebottom had played only eight games all year in a long list of Swans injuries

== Ladder ==
1977 WANFL ladder
Pos	Team	Pld	W	L	D	PF	PA	PP	Pts
1	Perth (P)	21	15	6	0	2655	2003	132.6	60
2	East Fremantle	21	14	7	0	2546	2077	122.6	56
3	West Perth	21	14	7	0	2543	2218	114.7	56
4	East Perth	21	13	8	0	2454	2060	119.1	52
5	South Fremantle	21	12	9	0	2470	2249	109.8	48
6	Subiaco	21	7	14	0	1901	2471	76.9	28
7	Claremont	21	6	15	0	1935	2587	74.8	24
8	Swan Districts	21	3	18	0	1964	2803	70.1	12

Rules for classification: 1) points; 2) percentage; 3) number of points for.
(P) Premiers

== Finals ==
=== First semi-final ===
	First semi-final
Saturday, 3 September	West Perth 14.13 (97)	def.	East Perth 10.5 (65)	Subiaco Oval (crowd: 26,186)
A superbly skilled and precise defensive effort on a perfect football day by the Cardinals sees East Perth on 0.1 (1) fifteen seconds before half-time, and they never have hope of winning.

=== Second semi-final ===
	Second semi-final
Saturday, 10 September	Perth 23.16 (154)	def.	East Fremantle 15.10 (100)	Subiaco Oval (crowd: 23,019)
With Peake and Wiley both absent, Perth rebound dramatically from their last round debacle with Murray Couper kicking eight.

=== Preliminary final ===
	Preliminary final
Saturday, 17 September	East Fremantle 17.15 (117)	def.	West Perth 15.11 (101)	Subiaco Oval (crowd: 23,193)

=== Grand Final ===
1977 WANFL Grand Final
Saturday, 24 September	Perth	def.	East Fremantle	Subiaco Oval (crowd: 44,381)
4.4 (28); 12.7 (79); 19.10 (124); 26.13 (169)	Q1; Q2; Q3; Final	2.3 (15); 6.4 (40); 10.9 (69); 14.12 (96)	Umpires: Ross Capes, Ron Powell; Simpson Medal: Wim Rosbender (Perth)
Couper 6, Farrant 4, Mitsopoulos 3, Wiley 3, Hargrave 3, Currie 2, Johnson 2, Gibellini, Hill, Rosbender	Goals	Judge 4, Turco 3, Durnthaler 3, Peake, Jez, Reid, Ryan
Currie, Inman, Rosbender, Watt, Johnson, Hargrave, Day	Best	Reid, Neesham, Becu, Peake, Durnthaler, Diver
Perth's brilliant fleet of small men, with Wiley back for the first time in nine weeks, and a fast-running defence, completely outplays Old Easts to kick the highest ever WA(N)FL Grand Final score.

== State of Origin match ==
Western Australia vs Victoria
Saturday, 10 October	Western Australia	def.	Victoria	Subiaco Oval	"This Makes It a New Ball Game"
6.5 (41); 9.9 (63); 17.9 (111); 23.13 (151)	Q1; Q2; Q3; Final	0.0 (0); 3.4 (22); 4.6 (30); 8.9 (57)	Simpson Medal: Barry Cable
Max Richardson 6, Alexander 3, Monteath 2, Moss 2, Magro 2, Young 2, Sidebottom 2, Reid, Cable, Sewell, Featherby	Goals	Moore 4, Hendrie 2, Schimmelbusch, Picken
This was the first State of Origin game, and saw Western Australia inflict a crushing reversal on Victoria, who had previously been able to utilise countless players born and bred interstate. In the absence of Leigh Matthews and Kevin Bartlett, the Victorian roving division was slaughtered by Cable, Monteath and Max Richardson who kicked six straight.
