= 1978 WANFL season =

Australian rules football season

- Teams: 8
- Premiers: East Perth; 14th premiership
- Minor premiers: Perth; 7th minor premiership
- Sandover Medallist: Phil Kelly (East Perth)
- Leading goalkicker: Ray Bauskis (South Fremantle)

The 1978 WANFL season was the 94th season of the Western Australian National Football League in its various incarnations, and the second-last under that moniker.

In many respects this season proved the end of an era before the power balance in the WA(N)FL would drastically alter. Although apart from an almost rainless August less dry than the previous two seasons, 1978 saw numerous high-scoring records broken owing to the introduction from the eighth round of the interchange bench (initially called "switch-play") allowing players to be rotated and create a much faster game than possible when substituted players could not be returned to play. The average score of 113.92 points per team per game was four points higher than the previous record of 1977.

Claremont, after five years as a chopping block due to the absence of Graham Moss with only 28 wins from 105 games with Essendon, and rejuvenated by many young players who would star in their 1981 premiership and/or with VFL clubs began superbly and missed fourth place by a minuscule 0.1 percent after a remarkable final round, whilst West Perth, after a bad start with four losses, won ten in a row to become the frontrunner along with reigning champion Perth. Tailenders Subiaco and Swan Districts were trying desperately to win and avoid the wooden spoon, whilst powerhouses West Perth and East Perth battled with Claremont and South Fremantle for the last three places in the four. A near-record attendance at Leederville saw East Perth, who had won only six of their first fourteen matches, miraculously take the double chance after having been out of the four for almost the entire season as the Tigers and Bulldogs lost.

The finals continued the brilliant performances by East Perth to win by nineteen goals in the preliminary and then the Royals upset frontrunners Perth in a game where the weather seemed to change several times a quarter from sunny to torrential downpours.

== Home-and-away season ==
=== Round 1 (Easter weekend) ===
	Round 1
Saturday, 25 March	Subiaco 19.10 (124)	def.	West Perth 13.25 (103)	Subiaco Oval (crowd: 8878)
Saturday, 25 March	South Fremantle 13.15 (93)	def. by	Perth 14.18 (102)	Fremantle Oval (crowd: 11367)
Monday, 27 March	Claremont 18.17 (125)	def.	East Perth 11.18 (84)	Claremont Oval (crowd: 12890)
Monday, 27 March	Swan Districts 12.10 (82)	def. by	East Fremantle 16.25 (121)	Bassendean Oval (crowd: 9735)
Without crippled 84-goal spearhead Gary Fathers, Subiaco nonetheless produce a morale-boosting win led by Brian Douge's hard tacking, which recalled his Hawthorn days, and Peter Featherby's 40 possessions.; 1977 runners-up East Fremantle have a surprisingly tough struggle to beat an understrength Swan Districts, not getting on top until late in the third quarter.

=== Round 2 ===
	Round 2
Saturday, 1 April	West Perth 15.21 (111)	def. by	South Fremantle 24.16 (160)	Leederville Oval (crowd: 10624)
Saturday, 1 April	East Perth 22.20 (152)	def.	Swan Districts 12.8 (80)	Perth Oval (crowd: 8127)
Saturday, 1 April	Perth 20.11 (131)	def.	Subiaco 12.17 (89)	Lathlain Park (crowd: 8839)
Saturday, 1 April	East Fremantle 21.15 (141)	def.	Claremont 14.9 (93)	East Fremantle Oval (crowd: 9071)

=== Round 3 ===
	Round 3
Saturday, 8 April	Swan Districts 16.11 (107)	def. by	Perth 25.22 (172)	Bassendean Oval (crowd: 7765)
Saturday, 8 April	Subiaco 12.9 (81)	def. by	East Perth 16.18 (114)	Subiaco Oval (crowd: 8860)
Saturday, 8 April	West Perth 16.18 (114)	def. by	Claremont 24.13 (157)	Leederville Oval (crowd: 9756)
Saturday, 8 April	East Fremantle 16.15 (111)	def. by	South Fremantle 24.18 (162)	East Fremantle Oval (crowd: 15674)
Robert Wiley kicks nine goals for the Demons; After a poor first half East Perth's criticised big-man division makes a statement as Brad Smith and Paul Arnold become the matchwinners.

=== Round 4 ===
	Round 4
Saturday, 15 April	South Fremantle 23.19 (157)	def.	Subiaco 14.11 (95)	Fremantle Oval (crowd: 8044)
Saturday, 15 April	Perth 17.15 (117)	def.	West Perth 11.9 (75)	Lathlain Park (crowd: 8460)
Saturday, 15 April	Claremont 26.18 (174)	def.	Swan Districts 14.16 (100)	Claremont Oval (crowd: 6740)
Saturday, 15 April	East Perth 22.8 (140)	def.	East Fremantle 13.12 (90)	Perth Oval (crowd: 9732)
The brilliant roving of teenage brothers Phil and Jim Krakouer confirms Claremont as the most improved club in the WANFL, with Phil's burrowing into packs frequently confounding spectators in Graham Moss' two hundredth WANFL match.; For the second consecutive match East Fremantle have ten goals kicked against them by an opposition full-forward (in this case Archie Duda) and their disorganised backline suggested (correctly) to critics that Old Easts would not challenge for the flag.

=== Round 5 ===
	Round 5
Saturday, 22 April	Subiaco 21.24 (150)	def.	Swan Districts 7.20 (62)	Subiaco Oval (crowd: 4930)
Saturday, 22 April	Perth 21.18 (144)	def.	East Perth 14.15 (99)	Lathlain Park (crowd: 15837)
Saturday, 22 April	South Fremantle 15.20 (110)	def. by	Claremont 20.17 (137)	Fremantle Oval (crowd: 13560)
Saturday, 22 April	West Perth 23.16 (154)	def.	East Fremantle 23.9 (147)	Leederville Oval (crowd: 8245)
East Fremantle set WANFL record for the highest losing score, beaten since only by Swan Districts and West Perth in 1982. West Perth coach Percy Johnson wins the Cardinals their first match for 1978 with four surprise moves in the last quarter that counter Old Easts' move of Brian Needle into attack.; Despite their biggest win since Round 9, 1969, Subiaco nonetheless disappoint against a Swan Districts team that gave up extremely easily. Malone, returning in the dire need for a forward, kicked eight goals but should have had many more due to inaccuracy.

=== Round 6 ===
	Round 6
Saturday, 29 April	Swan Districts 13.23 (101)	def. by	West Perth 21.18 (144)	Bassendean Oval (crowd: 6572)
Saturday, 29 April	East Perth 18.9 (117)	def. by	South Fremantle 19.14 (128)	Perth Oval (crowd: 12830)
Saturday, 29 April	Claremont 24.10 (154)	def.	Subiaco 11.15 (81)	Claremont Oval (crowd: 8455)
Saturday, 29 April	East Fremantle 20.18 (138)	def.	Perth 10.13 (73)	East Fremantle Oval (crowd: 8175)
East Fremantle inflict Perth's first defeat by moving Brian Peake to ruck-rover and showing that Chester McKean could not compensate for the injured reigning Simpson Medallist Wim Rosbender.; Despite having the majority of midfield play, the winless Swans – with full-forward Mark Olsen in the reserves – kick themselves out of it with 3.17 (35) in first half including 0.8 (8) in second quarter.

=== Round 7 ===
	Round 7
Saturday, 6 May	South Fremantle 29.28 (202)	def.	Swan Districts 17.12 (114)	Fremantle Oval (crowd: 6875)
Saturday, 6 May	West Perth 22.24 (156)	def.	East Perth 14.10 (94)	Leederville Oval (crowd: 12767)
Saturday, 6 May	Perth 22.8 (140)	def. by	Claremont 23.19 (157)	Lathlain Park (crowd: 15670)
Saturday, 6 May	Subiaco 24.22 (166)	def.	East Fremantle 21.15 (141)	Subiaco Oval (crowd: 5969)
South Fremantle set a WAFL record for most scoring shots, beaten later in the season by Claremont against Subiaco; That game also set a record for the highest aggregate score in WANFL history, beating the 309 points by South Fremantle and Claremont from 1970.; In a high-scoring and extremely high-standard shootout, Claremont replace Perth at the top of the ladder, despite Robert Wiley having an amazing thirty-six kicks, with a superb final quarter led by Phil Krakouer and Ross Ditchburn.; 11.8 (74) by Mick Malone gives Subiaco a fighting win after being behind all day.Malone beat four opponents and was well supported by centre half-forward Ron Boyens.

=== Round 8 ===
	Round 8
Saturday, 13 May	West Perth 24.10 (154)	def.	Subiaco 9.16 (70)	Leederville Oval (crowd: 9680)
Saturday, 13 May	Perth 23.16 (154)	def.	South Fremantle 21.17 (143)	Lathlain Park (crowd: 10917)
Saturday, 13 May	East Perth 16.21 (117)	def.	Claremont 14.11 (95)	Perth Oval (crowd: 11109)
Saturday, 13 May	East Fremantle 19.13 (127)	def.	Swan Districts 15.14 (104)	East Fremantle Oval (crowd: 5015)
Perth's form slump was ended by a brilliant display from Alan Johnson, who had fifteen possessions in the second quarter. South Fremantle were thirty-six points down at one point but just failed.; East Perth captain-coach Barry Cable moves himself to a half-forward flank and plays a crafty game as Wayne Otway and Alex Hamilton defeat the Krakouer brothers on the ball, thus ending a worrying form slump by the Royals.; The official score at Leederville according to the goal umpires was West Perth 23.9 (147) to Subiaco 10.17 (77), but after the Cardinals submitted a protest backed by video evidence, this was adjusted by the WANFL directors.

=== Round 9 ===
	Round 9
Saturday, 20 May	South Fremantle 18.12 (120)	def. by	West Perth 19.10 (124)	Fremantle Oval (crowd: 11857)
Saturday, 20 May	Swan Districts 11.18 (84)	def. by	East Perth 15.16 (106)	Bassendean Oval (crowd: 5859)
Saturday, 20 May	Subiaco 8.21 (69)	def. by	Perth 15.19 (109)	Subiaco Oval (crowd: 5390)
Saturday, 20 May	Claremont 11.13 (79)	def. by	East Fremantle 18.12 (120)	Claremont Oval (crowd: 8926)
In an amazing game in showery and very windy conditions, Subiaco, failing to allow for the strong northwesterly wind when shooting for goal, kick only 1.12 (18) in the first half but 6.5 (41) in third before rain intensifies.

=== Round 10 ===
	Round 10
Saturday, 27 May	Subiaco 14.13 (97)	def. by	South Fremantle 21.16 (142)	Subiaco Oval (crowd: 6216)
Saturday, 27 May	West Perth 16.19 (115)	def.	Perth 11.10 (76)	Leederville Oval (crowd: 13168)
Saturday, 27 May	Swan Districts 13.18 (96)	def. by	Claremont 25.9 (159)	Bassendean Oval (crowd: 5396)
Saturday, 27 May	East Fremantle 11.16 (82)	def.	East Perth 8.11 (59)	East Fremantle Oval (crowd: 10023)
East Fremantle – with Needle back in defence and shutting Archie Duda out completely – recover from their early poor defensive displays with a superb effort in damp conditions.; West Perth achieve a sixth consecutive win as their followers overpower a Perth team that had a bad off-day all round.

=== Round 11 (Foundation Day) ===
	Round 11
Saturday, 3 June	Perth 19.17 (131)	def.	Swan Districts 9.11 (65)	Lathlain Park (crowd: 6126)
Saturday, 3 June	East Perth 21.14 (140)	def.	Subiaco 6.8 (44)	Perth Oval (crowd: 8897)
Monday, 5 June	Claremont 12.12 (84)	def. by	West Perth 20.21 (141)	Claremont Oval (crowd: 16752)
Monday, 5 June	South Fremantle 21.13 (139)	def.	East Fremantle 14.14 (98)	Fremantle Oval (crowd: 15864)
East Perth play brilliantly in the first half to kick 16.4 (100) to 2.6 (18), but the game degenerates badly into a farce after half-time due to Subiaco's inept play.; The silky skills of former forward Barry Day and Laurie Richards give West Perth a seventh win on end and leave the Cardinals out of second only by percentage.

=== Round 12 ===
	Round 12
Saturday, 17 June	Swan Districts 26.13 (169)	def.	Subiaco 16.13 (109)	Bassendean Oval (crowd: 3870)
Saturday, 17 June	East Perth 13.11 (89)	def. by	Perth 15.14 (104)	Perth Oval (crowd: 11789)
Saturday, 17 June	Claremont 18.14 (122)	def.	South Fremantle 16.15 (111)	Claremont Oval (crowd: 9687)
Saturday, 17 June	East Fremantle 22.7 (139)	def. by	West Perth 22.13 (145)	East Fremantle Oval (crowd: 9972)
The power and pace of West Perth captain John Duckworth decides an exciting, high-scoring game after East Fremantle kicked 16.4 (100) in two quarters.; With Mark Olsen kicking thirteen goals and Subiaco undermined by their persistent short-passing game, Swan Districts record only their second win in twenty-seven matches dating back to the sixth round of 1977.

=== Round 13 ===
	Round 13
Saturday, 24 June	West Perth 20.21 (141)	def.	Swan Districts 13.16 (94)	Leederville Oval (crowd: 8015)
Saturday, 24 June	South Fremantle 11.23 (89)	def.	East Perth 12.13 (85)	Fremantle Oval (crowd: 9974)
Saturday, 24 June	Subiaco 10.18 (78)	def. by	Claremont 16.26 (122)	Subiaco Oval (crowd: 5140)
Saturday, 24 June	Perth 16.19 (115)	def.	East Fremantle 14.13 (97)	Lathlain Park (crowd: 8081)
Despite kicking only a total of 3.17 (35) in the first and final quarters, Stephen Michael's superb ruck play gives South Fremantle a deserved win after controlling the game until three-quarter time.

=== Round 14 ===
	Round 14
Saturday, 1 July	Swan Districts 13.20 (98)	def. by	South Fremantle 15.16 (106)	Bassendean Oval (crowd: 5361)
Saturday, 1 July	East Perth 14.11 (95)	def. by	West Perth 15.11 (101)	Perth Oval (crowd: 15567)
Saturday, 1 July	Claremont 17.8 (110)	def. by	Perth 18.17 (125)	Claremont Oval (crowd: 10578)
Saturday, 1 July	East Fremantle 23.14 (152)	def.	Subiaco 10.6 (66)	East Fremantle Oval (crowd: 4630)
Apart from the second quarter East Fremantle kick 22.12 (144) to 3.3 (21) by an unmethodical Subiaco, but still see a major problem against the top clubs at centre half-forward.; Nervousness by Swan Districts forwards cost them a second win as Mark Olsen misses five easy shots whilst South Fremantle play straight down the ground.

=== Round 15 ===
	Round 15
Saturday, 8 July	Subiaco 13.10 (88)	def.	West Perth 10.23 (83)	Subiaco Oval (crowd: 6278)
Saturday, 8 July	South Fremantle 20.14 (134)	def.	Perth 16.14 (110)	Fremantle Oval (crowd: 11097)
Saturday, 8 July	Claremont 12.12 (84)	def. by	East Perth 13.13 (91)	Claremont Oval (crowd: 8916)
Saturday, 8 July	Swan Districts 17.17 (119)	def. by	East Fremantle 19.11 (125)	Bassendean Oval (crowd: 5527)
Wasteful play by West Perth and superb roving by Neil Randall and Neil Taylor ensures the Cardinals' first loss since Round 4 and Subiaco's first win since Round 7 – a win that in effect avoided the wooden spoon for Subiaco.

=== Round 16 ===
	Round 16
Saturday, 22 July	West Perth 10.15 (75)	def. by	South Fremantle 14.14 (98)	Leederville Oval (crowd: 9108)
Saturday, 22 July	East Perth 21.11 (137)	def.	Swan Districts 13.10 (88)	Perth Oval (crowd: 5917)
Saturday, 22 July	Perth 24.21 (165)	def.	Subiaco 16.9 (105)	Lathlain Park (crowd: 4019)
Saturday, 22 July	East Fremantle 15.17 (107)	def.	Claremont 6.10 (46)	East Fremantle Oval (crowd: 6527)
South Fremantle show that they are the best-equipped team for wet weather as they overcome their shortage of pace via a tough display in "the heaviest conditions seen in Perth for years".; The return of star defender Doug Green allows East Fremantle to completely blanket a disappointing Claremont attack that fail to support seventeen fine handballs from Moss.

=== Round 17 ===
	Round 17
Saturday, 29 July	Swan Districts 18.17 (125)	def.	Perth 9.13 (67)	Bassendean Oval (crowd: 5735)
Saturday, 29 July	Subiaco 10.10 (70)	def. by	East Perth 20.11 (131)	Subiaco Oval (crowd: 6370)
Saturday, 29 July	West Perth 22.23 (155)	def.	Claremont 19.9 (123)	Leederville Oval (crowd: 9858)
Saturday, 29 July	East Fremantle 18.15 (123)	def.	South Fremantle 17.8 (110)	East Fremantle Oval (crowd: 16678)
John Todd's sermon in a violent thunderstorm on Monday night drives Swans to a huge upset after only two wins in thirty-two games, as youngsters Phil Narkle and Simon Beasley show the form that would later make them VFL stars.

=== Round 18 ===
	Round 18
Saturday, 5 August	South Fremantle 13.30 (108)	def.	Subiaco 7.15 (57)	Fremantle Oval (crowd: 6016)
Saturday, 5 August	Perth 20.14 (134)	def.	West Perth 8.12 (60)	Lathlain Park (crowd: 11170)
Saturday, 5 August	Claremont 22.18 (150)	def.	Swan Districts 8.13 (61)	Claremont Oval (crowd: 6106)
Saturday, 5 August	East Perth 25.14 (164)	def.	East Fremantle 19.12 (126)	Perth Oval (crowd: 14278)
Perth bounce back from their shock loss to Swan Districts with a superbly planned victory that leaves the Cardinals severely troubled by a poor percentage and injuries.; Subiaco's ability to stifle the system of South accounts for the Bulldogs' woeful 6.21 (57) in the second half, although Subiaco prove just as unsystematic and do not threaten to win. Leading goalkicker Ray Bauskis kicks 3.9 (27).

=== Round 19 ===
	Round 19
Saturday, 12 August	Subiaco 15.15 (105)	def. by	Swan Districts 18.22 (130)	Subiaco Oval (crowd: 3597)
Saturday, 12 August	Perth 15.11 (101)	def. by	East Perth 16.10 (106)	Lathlain Park (crowd: 13675)
Saturday, 12 August	South Fremantle 16.19 (115)	def. by	Claremont 20.13 (133)	Fremantle Oval (crowd: 10217)
Saturday, 12 August	West Perth 23.14 (152)	def.	East Fremantle 14.16 (100)	Leederville Oval (crowd: 10523)
In a preview of the Grand Final, East Perth win with a goal from Alex Hamilton with four seconds remaining, a just result to a game which the Royals controlled aside from the first fifteen and final fifteen minutes.; Despite an incredible 40 kicks from Peter Featherby, Subiaco fail to match the enthusiasm of a Swan Districts team already showing success in rebuilding.

=== Round 20 ===
	Round 20
Saturday, 19 August	Swan Districts 15.9 (99)	def. by	West Perth 17.20 (122)	Bassendean Oval (crowd: 7790)
Saturday, 19 August	East Perth 18.9 (117)	def.	South Fremantle 17.13 (115)	Perth Oval (crowd: 15876)
Saturday, 19 August	Claremont 29.30 (204)	def.	Subiaco 12.4 (76)	Claremont Oval (crowd: 5237)
Saturday, 19 August	East Fremantle 14.20 (104)	def. by	Perth 16.9 (105)	East Fremantle Oval (crowd: 7655)
Two thrilling wins – one via a late goal from reigning Simpson Medallist Wim Rosbender – West Perth, South Fremantle, Claremont and East Perth are left in a titanic battle for the last three places in the four.; Owing to John Colreavy's eclipse of Featherby (banished to a forward pocket) in the centre and a remarkable dominance of possession, Claremont beat South Fremantle's Round 7 record for most scoring shots in an open-age WANFL match to boost their percentage and remain a finals threat.

=== Round 21 ===
	Round 21
Saturday, 26 August	South Fremantle 18.16 (124)	def. by	Swan Districts 21.17 (143)	Fremantle Oval (crowd: 7892)
Saturday, 26 August	West Perth 11.10 (76)	def. by	East Perth 11.19 (85)	Leederville Oval (crowd: 24567)
Saturday, 26 August	Perth 15.17 (107)	def.	Claremont 15.6 (96)	Lathlain Park (crowd: 13070)
Saturday, 26 August	Subiaco 18.15 (123)	def.	East Fremantle 16.15 (111)	Subiaco Oval (crowd: 2990)
In front of the third largest WANFL home-and-away attendance, East Perth rise from fifth to second with their win.; Two late goals by Perth's Farrant and Wiley along with three late goals from South Fremantle, drop Claremont from second to fifth in a few minutes for a dramatic finalé.; Swan Districts' youthful talent – in a desperate effort to avoid the wooden spoon – overwhelms a South Fremantle team desperately missing Joe McKay.

== Ladder ==
1978 WANFL ladder
Pos	Team	Pld	W	L	D	PF	PA	PP	Pts
1	Perth	21	15	6	0	2482	2176	114.1	60
2	East Perth (P)	21	13	8	0	2322	2063	112.6	52
3	West Perth	21	13	8	0	2501	2305	108.5	52
4	South Fremantle	21	12	9	0	2666	2323	114.8	48
5	Claremont	21	12	9	0	2604	2270	114.7	48
6	East Fremantle	21	10	11	0	2500	2396	104.3	40
7	Subiaco	21	5	16	0	1943	2782	69.8	20
8	Swan Districts	21	4	17	0	2121	2824	75.1	16

Source: "1978 Ladder". WAFL Footy Facts.
Rules for classification: 1) points; 2) percentage; 3) number of points for.
(P) Premiers

== Finals ==
=== First semi-final ===
	First semi-final
Saturday, 2 September	West Perth 12.10 (82)	def. by	South Fremantle 13.17 (95)	Subiaco Oval (crowd: 26,486)
Mal Brown's reorganisation of his team's defence produces a surprising recovery from their last round defeat by the wooden-spooners.

=== Second semi-final ===
	Second semi-final
Saturday, 9 September	Perth 13.8 (86)	def.	East Perth 8.9 (57)	Subiaco Oval (crowd: 27,261)
A dour win in windy conditions makes Perth firm favourites for a second hat-trick of flags in a decade, despite the loss of key forward Murray Couper after he was suspended for throwing the ball in an umpire's face after believing he was wrongly denied a free kick for holding the ball.

=== Preliminary final ===
	Preliminary final
Saturday, 16 September	East Perth 27.15 (177)	def.	South Fremantle 9.11 (65)	Subiaco Oval (crowd: 29,763)
East Perth conclusively thrash Bulldogs by a record preliminary final margin – the second highest in any WANFL final behind the 1959 first semi.; South Fremantle hit the lead early in the second quarter but afterwards score only 3.9 (27) to 22.10 (142), with Paul Arnold kicking nine goals to equal the record for a WANFL final. (Note: Held by Bob Johnson in the 1962 Preliminary Final and Eric Gorman in the 1963 Grand Final, and subsequently broken by Darren Bennett in the 1986 Second Semi and Warren Ralph in the corresponding match of 1987.)

== Grand final ==
1978 WANFL Grand Final
Saturday, 23 September	Perth	def. by	East Perth	Subiaco Oval (crowd: 45,126)
4.0 (24); 5.2 (32); 9.5 (59); 12.7 (79)	Q1; Q2; Q3; Final	4.5 (29); 6.6 (42); 9.9 (63); 11.15 (81)	Umpires: Ross Capes, Ron Buckey; Simpson Medal: Ian Miller (East Perth)
Bosustow 7, Doyle 2, Dowell, Mitsopoulos, Wiley	Goals	Arnold 4, Kelly 3, Allen, Duggan, Kickett, McGuire
Bosustow, Wiley, Gibellini, Johnson, Rosbender, Currie	Best	Miller, Kelly, Duke, Otway, McGuire, Kickett
Injuries	Earnshaw (leg)
In a game of fluctuating weather varying from sunshine to almost monsoon-like rain, East Perth hold on to record only their second win from ten grand finals since 1961
