= 1979 AFC Night Series =

AFC Escort Championships

Tournament details
- Dates: 2 March – 3 July 1979
- Teams: 23
- Venue: 7 (in 5 host cities)

Final positions
- Champions: Collingwood (1st title)
- Runners-up: Hawthorn

Tournament statistics
- Matches played: 22
- Attendance: 156,625 (7,119 per match)

The 1979 Australian Football Championships Night Series was the 1st edition of the AFC Night Series, a VFL-organised national club Australian rules football tournament between the leading clubs from the VFL, the WANFL and State Representative Teams.

In June 1978 the VFL announced their plans to form a new company to oversee a night series that would be broadcast nationally and Australian Football Championships Pty. Ltd. was incorporated on 28 July 1978 to run a rival national night competition, in opposition to the NFL Night Series. By October 1978, The VFL were joined by the WAFL, TANFL, NSWAFL and ACTAFL in the joint venture and transferred from NFL Night Series to the AFC Night Series. However, the SANFL rejected the VFL's overtures, choosing to remain aligned with the NFL instead. They were joined by the VFA and QAFL in a greatly-reduced NFL Series.

== Qualified Teams ==
Team	Nickname	League	Qualification	Participation (bold indicates winners)^{1}
Enter in Round 2
Hawthorn	Hawks	VFL	Winners of the 1978 Victorian Football League	3rd (Previous: **1971**, **1976**)
North Melbourne	Kangaroos	VFL	Runners-up in the 1978 Victorian Football League	3rd (Previous: **1975**, 1976)
Collingwood	Magpies	VFL	Third place in the 1978 Victorian Football League	3rd (Previous: **1896**, 1910)
Carlton	Blues	VFL	Fourth place in the 1978 Victorian Football League	8th (Previous: 1907, 1908, 1914, **1968**, **1970**, 1972, 1976)
Geelong	Cats	VFL	Fifth place in the 1978 Victorian Football League	1st
East Perth	Royals	WANFL	Winners of the 1978 Western Australian National Football League	3rd (Previous: 1972, 1977, 1978)
Perth	Demons	WANFL	Runners-up in the 1978 Western Australian National Football League	3rd (Previous: 1977, 1978)
South Fremantle	Bulldogs	WANFL	Third place in the 1978 Western Australian National Football League	3rd (Previous: 1976, 1977)
Australian Capital Territory	Rams	ACTAFL	State Representative Team	3rd (Previous: 1977, 1978)
Enter in Round 1
St Kilda	Saints	VFL	Sixth place in the 1978 Victorian Football League	1st
Richmond	Tigers	VFL	Seventh place in the 1978 Victorian Football League	5th (Previous: **1969**, **1973**, **1974**, 1976)
South Melbourne	Swans	VFL	Eighth place in the 1978 Victorian Football League	4th (Previous: 1888, 1890, **1909**)
Fitzroy	Lions	VFL	Ninth place in the 1978 Victorian Football League	2nd (Previous: 1913)
Essendon	Bombers	VFL	Tenth place in the 1978 Victorian Football League	3rd (Previous: **1893**, 1911)
Footscray	Bulldogs	VFL	Eleventh Place in the 1978 Victorian Football League	2nd (Previous: 1976)
Melbourne	Demons	VFL	Twelfth Place in the 1978 Victorian Football League	1st
West Perth	Falcons	WANFL	Fourth place in the 1978 Western Australian National Football League	5th (Previous: 1975, 1976, 1977, 1978)
Claremont	Tigers	WANFL	Fifth place in the 1978 Western Australian National Football League	2nd (Previous: 1977)
East Fremantle	Sharks	WANFL	Sixth place in the 1978 Western Australian National Football League	4th (Previous: 1974, 1977, 1978)
Subiaco	Lions	WANFL	Seventh place 1978 Western Australian National Football League	2nd (Previous: 1973)
Swan Districts	Swans	WANFL	Eighth place in the 1978 Western Australian National Football League	2nd (Previous: 1976)
New South Wales	Blues	NSWAFL	State Representative Team	3rd (Previous: 1977, 1978)
Tasmania	Devils	TANFL	State Representative Team	4th (Previous: 1974, 1977, 1978)

^{1} Includes previous appearances in the Championship of Australia and NFL Night Series.

== Venues ==
Melbourne	Perth			Sydney	Hobart	Canberra
Waverley Park	Perth Oval	Subiaco Oval	Leederville Oval	Sydney Showground	North Hobart Oval	Phillip Oval
Capacity: 72,000	Capacity: 27,000	Capacity: 53,000	Capacity: 25,000	Capacity: 40,000	Capacity: 26,000	Capacity: 15,000

== Knockout stage ==
=== Round 1 ===
2 March 1979	South Melbourne	93–55	West Perth	Waverley Park, Melbourne
	13.5 (93)		7.13 (55)	Attendance: 6,815

4 March 1979	Swan Districts	122–160	Essendon	Perth Oval, Perth
	18.14 (122)		21.14 (160)	Attendance: 5,000 (estimate)

9 March 1979	Richmond	150–66	Subiaco	Waverley Park, Melbourne
	22.18 (150)		9.12 (66)	Attendance: 5,808

11 March 1979	New South Wales	77–133	Fitzroy	Sydney Showground, Sydney
	11.11 (77)		20.13 (133)	Attendance: 3,000 (estimate)

16 March 1979	St Kilda	82–114	East Fremantle	Waverley Park, Melbourne
	12.10 (82)		16.18 (114)	Attendance: 4,894

18 March 1979	Tasmania	60–125	Footscray	North Hobart Oval, Hobart
	9.6 (60)		19.11 (125)	Attendance: 7,243

25 March 1979	Claremont	111–96	Melbourne	Leederville Oval, Perth
	17.9 (111)		15.6 (96)	Attendance: 4,500 (estimate)

=== Round 2 ===
23 March 1979	South Melbourne	109–61	South Fremantle	Waverley Park, Melbourne
	16.13 (109)		8.13 (61)	Attendance: 3,000

25 March 1979	Australian Capital Territory	52–162	North Melbourne	Phillip Oval, Canberra
	7.10 (52)		24.18 (162)	Attendance: 8,300

27 March 1979	Collingwood	89–47	Essendon	Waverley Park, Melbourne
	12.7 (89)		6.11 (47)	Attendance: 8,813

3 April 1979	Geelong	77–51	Richmond	Waverley Park, Melbourne
	10.17 (77)		6.15 (51)	Attendance: 4,885

10 April 1979	Fitzroy	90–78	Carlton	Waverley Park, Melbourne
	12.18 (90)		11.12 (78)	Attendance: 5,160

24 April 1979	Footscray	59–63	East Perth	Waverley Park, Melbourne
	8.11 (59)		9.9 (63)	Attendance: 4,338

1 May 1979	Perth	89–75	East Fremantle	Subiaco Oval, Perth
	13.11 (89)		11.9 (75)	Attendance: 3,000

1 May 1979	Hawthorn	114–93	Claremont	Waverley Park, Melbourne
	16.18 (114)		14.9 (93)	Attendance: 3,730

=== Quarter-finals ===
QF #1 8 May 1979	Collingwood	102–51	South Melbourne	Waverley Park, Melbourne
	15.12 (102)		7.9 (51)	Attendance: 6,796

QF #2 15 May 1979	Fitzroy	60–55	Geelong	Waverley Park, Melbourne
	9.6 (60)		7.13 (55)	Attendance: 7,119

QF #3 22 May 1979	East Perth	87–67	Perth	Waverley Park, Melbourne
	13.9 (87)		11.1 (67)	Attendance: 2,583

QF #4 29 May 1979	Hawthorn	52–50	North Melbourne	Waverley Park, Melbourne
	7.10 (52)		6.14 (50)	Attendance: 7,456

=== Semi-finals ===
SF #1 5 June 1979	Collingwood	116–49	Fitzroy	Waverley Park, Melbourne
	17.14 (116)		4.7 (31)	Attendance: 12,389

SF #2 19 June 1979	Hawthorn	67–31	East Perth	Waverley Park, Melbourne
	9.13 (67)		4.7 (31)	Attendance: 4,073

=== Australian Football Championships Night Series Final ===
Final 3 July 1979	Collingwood	80–52	Hawthorn	Waverley Park, Melbourne
	2.1 (13); 5.1 (31); 9.7 (61); 12.8 (80)		3.4 (22); 4.7 (31); 6.8 (44); 7.10 (52)	Attendance: 37,753; Umpires: Cameron, Deller
		Goals
	Austen 4 Banks, Davis 2 Wearmouth, Brewer, Valli, Anderson 1		Hendrie 2 Goss, Goad, Eade, Wilkinson, Turner 1
