= Max George (footballer) =

Australian rules footballer (born 1952)

Personal information
- Full name: Maxwell George
- Born: 4 January 1952 (age 74)
- Height: 188 cm (6 ft 2 in)
- Weight: 86 kg (190 lb)
- Position: Full-forward

Playing career^{1}
Years	Club	Games (Goals)
1969–75, 1977–78	Swans Districts	74 (250)
1976	Fitzroy	8 (20)
1978–79, 1981	Central District	33 (120)
- ^{1} Playing statistics correct to the end of 1981.

Maxwell George (born 4 January 1952) is a former Australian rules footballer who played in three states, for Fitzroy of the Victorian Football League (VFL), Swan Districts and Central District.

George had a strong start to his VFL career, kicking five goals on his debut, against Essendon at VFL Park, setting a new club record. He followed it up with a four-goal haul when Fitzroy defeated Richmond the subsequent weekend and finished the year with 20 goals.

Before arriving at Fitzroy for his single season stint, George played with Swans Districts in the Western Australian National Football League (WANFL) from 1969 to 1975. A full-forward, he topped their goalkicking in 1969, 1973 and 1974. His tally of 90 goals in 1974 was enough to win him the league's leading goalkicker trophy, the first Swan Districts player to do so. During that season he put in one particularly memorable performance against West Perth when he kicked fourteen goals, still a Swan Districts club record. George, who took many good overhead marks, represented Western Australia in three interstate matches, for 11 goals, and was in their squad for the 1975 Knockout Carnival. In 1977 he took the field for Geraldton and then crossed to Central District in South Australia.

The full-forward spent three seasons at Central and was their leading goalkicker in 1978 with 68 goals.
