= 1974 WANFL season =

Australian rules football season

- Teams: 8
- Premiers: East Fremantle; 24th premiership
- Minor premiers: East Fremantle; 29th minor premiership
- Sandover Medallist: Graham Melrose (East Fremantle)
- Leading goalkicker: Max George (Swan Districts)
- Matches played: 88

The 1974 WAFL season was the 90th season of the various incarnations of senior football in Perth and the forty-fourth as the "Western Australian National Football League". It continued the fluctuating fortunes of clubs that had been part and parcel of the league since 1970, with East Perth, the most consistent player in the competition for eight years, missing finals participation for the only time in seventeen seasons between 1966 and 1982 due largely to injuries to key defenders Gary Malarkey, who missed the second half of the season, and Ken McAullay who did not play at all. West Perth fell from runners-up (after being flag favourites before the Grand Final) to their worst season since 1939, largely owing to the loss of 1973 leading goalkicker Phil Smith which left a gaping hole in their attack.

On the other hand, Swan Districts, with full-forward Max George and big Bob Beecroft prominent, won the Rodriguez Shield for the second time and played finals for the first time since 1965 after eight bleak years that had seen them a kick away from a winless season six seasons previously, whilst East Fremantle made a similar if less abrupt recovery to win their first premiership for nine years and first minor premiership for a decade.

== Home-and-away season ==
=== Round 1 ===
	Round 1
Saturday, 6 April	East Perth 23.15 (153)	def.	South Fremantle 16.11 (107)	Perth Oval (crowd: 10896)
Saturday, 6 April	Subiaco 11.12 (78)	def.	Perth 7.21 (63)	Subiaco Oval (crowd: 9960)
Saturday, 6 April	Claremont 9.12 (66)	def.	Swan Districts 8.11 (59)	Claremont Oval (crowd: 9310)
Saturday, 6 April	East Fremantle 9.22 (76)	def. by	West Perth 12.8 (80)	East Fremantle Oval (crowd: 10237)
Perth newcomer Robert Wiley kicks 1.8 (14) and combined with Ross Smith's outstanding form allows Subiaco to overcome major pre-season injury and training problems notably the departure of Keith Watt.; West Perth equal a club record from 1932 by winning with eleven fewer scoring shots, though falling one short of the current league record.

=== Round 2 (Easter weekend) ===
	Round 2
Saturday, 13 April	Swan Districts 9.12 (66)	def.	Subiaco 6.13 (49)	Bassendean Oval (crowd: 9850)
Saturday, 13 April	South Fremantle 10.13 (73)	def. by	East Fremantle 13.14 (92)	Fremantle Oval (crowd: 13378)
Monday, 15 April	West Perth 12.15 (87)	def. by	East Perth 13.15 (93)	Leederville Oval (crowd: 16922)
Monday, 15 April	Perth 21.13 (139)	def.	Claremont 14.8 (92)	Lathlain Park (crowd: 9841)
Austin Robertson was goalless in a match for the first time since Round 15, 1965 (he left the field with an underestimated groin injury at three-quarter time), as Swan Districts celebrate the fortieth anniversary with an impressive win in very wet conditions.; With rovers Jenzen and Wiley (thirteen goals and seven behinds between them) dominant, Perth overrun Claremont in the last quarter. Wiley amazingly leads the goalkicking for a week after his second WANFL game.

=== Round 3 ===
	Round 3
Saturday, 20 April	Subiaco 12.13 (85)	def. by	South Fremantle 19.15 (129)	Subiaco Oval (crowd: 8742)
Saturday, 20 April	Perth 10.14 (74)	def. by	East Perth 16.14 (110)	Lathlain Park (crowd: 9825)
Saturday, 20 April	West Perth 9.25 (79)	def.	Claremont 9.11 (65)	Leederville Oval (crowd: 11624)
Saturday, 20 April	East Fremantle 11.14 (80)	drew with	Swan Districts 11.14 (80)	East Fremantle Oval (crowd: 9733)
The draw at East Fremantle Oval would prove the last for 888 WA(N)FL games until the sixth round of 1984 at Leederville Oval, (Note: There were 948 WANFL games with no draws between Round 11, 1946 and Round 19, 1957 inclusive. Subsequently there would be a sequence of 918 WAFL games with no draws between Round 12, 2012 and Round 14, 2022 inclusive. The SANFL record is over 788 games with no draws between Round 6, 1941 and Round 1, 1955 inclusive, and the VFL/AFL record is 470 games without a draw between Round 2, 1982 and the first half of Round 11, 1985, inclusive.) the second-longest non-occurrence of draws in a major Australian Rules league.; As of 2025, it is Old Easts' most recent drawn home-and-away game, with their sole subsequent tie occurring in the 1989 First Semi-Final.; In contrast to their opening-round accuracy, West Perth's score against Claremont is their second most surplus of behinds over goals on record.

=== Round 4 (Anzac Day) ===
	Round 4
Thursday, 25 April	Subiaco 14.15 (99)	def.	East Perth 11.11 (77)	Subiaco Oval (crowd: 15522)
Saturday, 27 April	South Fremantle 19.18 (132)	def.	Swan Districts 14.15 (99)	Fremantle Oval (crowd: 10648)
Saturday, 27 April	West Perth 11.19 (85)	def. by	Perth 18.10 (118)	Leederville Oval (crowd: 10620)
Saturday, 27 April	Claremont 11.12 (78)	def. by	East Fremantle 23.12 (150)	Claremont Oval (crowd: 8902)
Peter Featherby produces an amazing 46 kicks and nine handballs to win Subiaco a game it was originally thought they would forfeit as they did not want to play on Anzac Day.

=== Round 5 ===
	Round 5
Saturday, 4 May	Subiaco 10.11 (71)	def.	West Perth 8.15 (63)	Subiaco Oval (crowd: 7553)
Saturday, 4 May	Swan Districts 13.14 (92)	def.	East Perth 8.15 (63)	Bassendean Oval (crowd: 7216)
Saturday, 4 May	South Fremantle 14.19 (103)	def.	Claremont 6.18 (54)	Fremantle Oval (crowd: 5447)
Saturday, 4 May	Perth 10.8 (68)	def. by	East Fremantle 11.15 (81)	Lathlain Park (crowd: 6896)

=== Round 6 ===
	Round 6
Saturday, 11 May	West Perth 9.14 (68)	def. by	Swan Districts 14.10 (94)	Leederville Oval (crowd: 8118)
Saturday, 11 May	Perth 13.13 (91)	def. by	South Fremantle 22.15 (147)	Lathlain Park (crowd: 7489)
Saturday, 11 May	Claremont 7.19 (61)	def.	East Perth 8.10 (58)	Claremont Oval (crowd: 5158)
Saturday, 11 May	East Fremantle 10.9 (69)	def.	Subiaco 7.4 (46)	East Fremantle Oval (crowd: 9272)
The roving of Graham Melrose and Tony Buhagiar in wet conditions establish East Fremantle as the team to beat for the premiership as they win their fifth straight against the reigning champions.; Coach Verdun Howell's experiment with half-back Mick Elphick and winger Garry Caporn as ruck-rovers drive Claremont to bounce back after a disastrous month of losses.

=== Round 7 ===
	Round 7
Saturday, 18 May	South Fremantle 17.16 (118)	def.	West Perth 13.13 (91)	Fremantle Oval (crowd: 8508)
Saturday, 18 May	Swan Districts 10.11 (71)	def. by	Perth 21.15 (141)	Bassendean Oval (crowd: 8020)
Saturday, 18 May	Subiaco 6.16 (52)	def. by	Claremont 22.20 (152)	Subiaco Oval (crowd: 7421)
Saturday, 18 May	East Perth 14.17 (101)	def.	East Fremantle 13.19 (97)	Perth Oval (crowd: 8899)
With Blethyn kicking eight goals and giving away another three, and their rovers demolishing a Lions team who had Austin Robertson in the reserves after his groin injury, Claremont record the biggest win in the WANFL for two years and their biggest since 1964.

=== Round 8 ===
	Round 8
Saturday, 25 May	Subiaco 12.25 (97)	def.	Swan Districts 8.14 (62)	Subiaco Oval (crowd: 6978)
Saturday, 25 May	East Perth 10.15 (75)	def. by	West Perth 20.9 (129)	Perth Oval (crowd: 6777)
Saturday, 25 May	Claremont 11.13 (79)	def. by	Perth 16.19 (115)	Claremont Oval (crowd: 6377)
Saturday, 25 May	East Fremantle 6.10 (46)	def. by	South Fremantle 13.17 (95)	East Fremantle Oval (crowd: 16110)
South Fremantle win their sixth consecutive match to take top place with a speedy young centreline on another wet May afternoon.; Eight goals and five behinds from Austin Robertson in his third senior game for the season, along with Swans' sluggish play, sees Subiaco rebound from the Claremont debacle.

=== Round 9 (Foundation Day) ===
	Round 9
Saturday, 1 June	Swan Districts 8.7 (55)	def. by	Claremont 10.18 (78)	Bassendean Oval (crowd: 6150)
Saturday, 1 June	West Perth 13.15 (93)	def. by	East Fremantle 20.19 (139)	Leederville Oval (crowd: 8492)
Monday, 3 June	South Fremantle 12.20 (92)	def.	East Perth 9.18 (72)	Fremantle Oval (crowd: 12940)
Monday, 3 June	Perth 17.12 (114)	def.	Subiaco 12.10 (82)	Lathlain Park (crowd: 10868)

=== Round 10 ===
	Round 10
Saturday, 8 June	South Fremantle 10.5 (65)	def. by	Subiaco 23.17 (155)	Fremantle Oval (crowd: 112020)
Saturday, 8 June	East Perth 15.14 (104)	def. by	Perth 18.14 (122)	Perth Oval (crowd: 100590)
Saturday, 8 June	Claremont 14.14 (98)	def.	West Perth 11.5 (71)	Claremont Oval (crowd: 86980)
Saturday, 8 June	Swan Districts 19.17 (131)	def.	East Fremantle 15.16 (106)	Bassendean Oval (crowd: 8650)
The return of captain-coach Smith provides the impetus for the finest team display of the season as Subiaco end South Fremantle's seven-game winning streak with Mike Fitzpatrick unstoppable and half-forward Neil Randall gaining thirty kicks.

=== Round 11 ===
	Round 11
Saturday, 15 June	Swan Districts 12.16 (88)	def. by	South Fremantle 16.14 (110)	Bassendean Oval (crowd: 10250)
Saturday, 15 June	Perth 12.13 (85)	def.	West Perth 12.6 (78)	Lathlain Park (crowd: 8088)
Saturday, 15 June	Subiaco 11.12 (78)	def. by	East Perth 20.18 (138)	Subiaco Oval (crowd: 10212)
Saturday, 15 June	East Fremantle 25.13 (163)	def.	Claremont 11.17 (83)	East Fremantle Oval (crowd: 9539)

=== Round 12 ===
	Round 12
Saturday, 22 June	West Perth 9.14 (68)	def. by	Subiaco 10.10 (70)	Leederville Oval (crowd: 6778)
Saturday, 22 June	East Perth 12.15 (87)	def. by	Swan Districts 19.14 (128)	Perth Oval (crowd: 7821)
Saturday, 22 June	Claremont 20.7 (127)	def.	South Fremantle 15.17 (107)	Claremont Oval (crowd: 7514)
Saturday, 22 June	East Fremantle 16.14 (110)	def.	Perth 9.15 (69)	East Fremantle Oval (crowd: 8220)

=== Round 13 ===
	Round 13
Saturday, 29 June	Swan Districts 27.13 (175)	def.	West Perth 13.10 (88)	Bassendean Oval (crowd: 9350)
Saturday, 29 June	South Fremantle 16.11 (107)	def. by	Perth 16.17 (113)	Fremantle Oval (crowd: 9373)
Saturday, 29 June	East Perth 17.11 (113)	def.	Claremont 8.10 (58)	Perth Oval (crowd: 9071)
Saturday, 29 June	Subiaco 11.12 (78)	def. by	East Fremantle 16.14 (110)	Subiaco Oval (crowd: 9530)
Max George kicks fourteen goals for Swan Districts, the most by any Swan in a match and the most at Bassendean Oval.; East Perth move within half a game of the four in a match where Claremont not only lost the game by half time when they remained goalless but also lost A$1119 in property and $458 in cash due to negligence. Archie Duda kicked eight goals to secure his spot from returning forward Phil Haughan, who kicked fifteen in the reserves.

=== Round 14 ===
	Round 14
Saturday, 6 July	West Perth 8.4 (52)	def. by	South Fremantle 15.15 (105)	Leederville Oval (crowd: 7701)
Saturday, 6 July	Perth 19.13 (127)	def.	Swan Districts 12.19 (91)	Lathlain Park (crowd: 11703)
Saturday, 6 July	Claremont 10.11 (71)	def. by	Subiaco 12.8 (80)	Claremont Oval (crowd: 7520)
Saturday, 6 July	East Fremantle 11.17 (83)	def. by	East Perth 16.9 (105)	East Fremantle Oval (crowd: 9591)
The return of eighteen-year-old prodigy Peter Spencer from a broken jaw gives East Perth ascendancy over the powerful East Fremantle centreline and an unexpected victory to enter the four.

=== Round 15 ===
	Round 15
Saturday, 20 July	East Perth 25.6 (156)	def.	South Fremantle 12.11 (83)	Perth Oval (crowd: 8812)
Saturday, 20 July	Subiaco 18.6 (114)	def.	Perth 14.12 (96)	Subiaco Oval (crowd: 7925)
Saturday, 20 July	Claremont 12.10 (82)	def. by	Swan Districts 16.10 (106)	Claremont Oval (crowd: 7218)
Saturday, 20 July	East Fremantle 21.12 (138)	def.	West Perth 14.8 (92)	East Fremantle Oval (crowd: 6153)
As a percentage, East Perth's score was their most accurate until 1980. Archie Duda kicked nine goals.

=== Round 16 ===
	Round 16
Saturday, 27 July	Swan Districts 12.15 (87)	def.	Subiaco 12.11 (83)	Bassendean Oval (crowd: 10757)
Saturday, 27 July	West Perth 13.16 (94)	def.	East Perth 12.15 (87)	Leederville Oval (crowd: 8462)
Saturday, 27 July	Perth 18.17 (125)	def.	Claremont 14.8 (92)	Lathlain Park (crowd: 6790)
Saturday, 27 July	South Fremantle 20.10 (130)	def.	East Fremantle 13.17 (95)	Fremantle Oval (crowd: 13130)
Subiaco fail to land a decisive thrust after fighting from thirty points behind against Swans.; East Perth junior Stuart Hillier leads tailender West Perth to a surprise win by forming a winning centreline with Ian Logan and veteran Mel Whinnen, moved after half-time to the unfamiliar position of wingman and collaring young champion Spencer for the first time.

=== Round 17 ===
	Round 17
Saturday, 3 August	Subiaco 6.8 (44)	def.	South Fremantle 5.7 (37)	Subiaco Oval (crowd: 7156)
Saturday, 3 August	Perth 9.13 (67)	def.	East Perth 6.7 (43)	Lathlain Park (crowd: 6769)
Saturday, 3 August	West Perth 9.13 (67)	def. by	Claremont 11.10 (76)	Leederville Oval (crowd: 4502)
Saturday, 3 August	East Fremantle 20.14 (134)	def.	Swan Districts 14.15 (99)	East Fremantle Oval (crowd: 7329)
East Fremantle's small-man strength wins decisively over a bigger and taller Swan Districts outfit to leave that club needing three wins from four games for a finals berth.

=== Round 18 ===
	Round 18
Saturday, 10 August	South Fremantle 12.12 (84)	def. by	Swan Districts 15.19 (109)	Fremantle Oval (crowd: 8905)
Saturday, 10 August	West Perth 20.13 (133)	def.	Perth 14.13 (97)	Leederville Oval (crowd: 6056)
Saturday, 10 August	East Perth 10.15 (75)	def. by	Subiaco 12.16 (88)	Perth Oval (crowd: 11325)
Saturday, 10 August	Claremont 13.11 (89)	def. by	East Fremantle 13.16 (94)	Claremont Oval (crowd: 6934)
Despite kicking only 3.4 (22) to 9.7 (61) between half-time and time-on in the last quarter, East Fremantle get a critical victory because during the second quarter David Hollins kicks a goal simultaneously with forward Kerry Williams being interfered with off the ball, so Old Easts got another kick and two goals without a centre bounce.

=== Round 19 ===
	Round 19
Saturday, 17 August	Subiaco 12.11 (83)	def.	West Perth 7.11 (53)	Subiaco Oval (crowd: 7654)
Saturday, 17 August	Swan Districts 11.19 (85)	def.	East Perth 6.10 (46)	Bassendean Oval (crowd: 8320)
Saturday, 17 August	South Fremantle 15.15 (105)	def.	Claremont 10.12 (72)	Fremantle Oval (crowd: 6255)
Saturday, 17 August	Perth 13.5 (83)	def. by	East Fremantle 12.15 (87)	Lathlain Park (crowd: 7841)
East Fremantle gain a second successive lucky win, coming back from 23 points down with seven goals, including one where Perth fullback John Quartermaine was disallowed an apparently fair mark.

=== Round 20 ===
	Round 20
Saturday, 24 August	West Perth 13.14 (92)	def. by	Swan Districts 14.13 (97)	Leederville Oval (crowd: 9711)
Saturday, 24 August	Perth 16.16 (112)	def.	South Fremantle 13.9 (87)	Lathlain Park (crowd: 11032)
Saturday, 24 August	Claremont 14.13 (97)	def. by	East Perth 21.10 (136)	Claremont Oval (crowd: 5092)
Saturday, 24 August	East Fremantle 13.12 (90)	def.	Subiaco 11.6 (72)	East Fremantle Oval (crowd: 11814)

=== Round 21 ===
	Round 21
Saturday, 31 August	South Fremantle 9.20 (74)	def. by	West Perth 14.11 (95)	Fremantle Oval (crowd: 9558)
Saturday, 31 August	Swan Districts 8.10 (58)	def. by	Perth 18.19 (127)	Bassendean Oval (crowd: 17520)
Saturday, 31 August	Subiaco 13.21 (99)	def.	Claremont 8.8 (56)	Subiaco Oval (crowd: 6850)
Saturday, 31 August	East Perth 20.13 (133)	def.	East Fremantle 18.16 (124)	Perth Oval (crowd: 6701)
Mel Whinnen becomes the first to play 300 WANFL matches as his Cardinals drive South Fremantle, at one point the pacesetters, out of the top four.

== Ladder ==
1974 WANFL ladder
Pos	Team	Pld	W	L	D	PF	PA	PP	Pts
1	East Fremantle (P)	21	13	7	1	2164	1878	115.2	54
2	Perth	21	13	8	0	2146	1929	111.2	52
3	Subiaco	21	12	9	0	1703	1741	97.8	48
4	Swan Districts	21	11	9	1	1932	1940	99.6	46
5	South Fremantle	21	11	10	0	2090	2001	104.4	44
6	East Perth	21	10	11	0	2025	1945	104.1	40
7	Claremont	21	7	14	0	1726	2076	83.1	28
8	West Perth	21	6	15	0	1758	2034	86.4	24

Rules for classification: 1) points; 2) percentage; 3) number of points for.
(P) Premiers

== Finals ==
=== First semi-final ===
	First semi-final
Saturday, 7 September	Subiaco 11.10 (76)	def. by	Swan Districts 13.21 (99)	Subiaco Oval (crowd: 25,570)
This was the last match for record-setting goalkicker Austin Robertson, Jr. and Subiaco's last final until 1985.

=== Second semi-final ===
	Second semi-final
Saturday, 14 September	East Fremantle 17.15 (117)	def.	Perth 13.16 (94)	Subiaco Oval (crowd: 26,079)

=== Preliminary final ===
	Preliminary final
Saturday, 21 September	Perth 12.12 (84)	def.	Swan Districts 9.15 (69)	Subiaco Oval (crowd: 27,426)
A strong first half with a 37-point lead is enough to see a jaded and sore Perth team make its first Grand Final for four seasons.

=== Grand Final ===
1974 WANFL Grand Final
Saturday, 28 September	East Fremantle	def.	Perth	Subiaco Oval (crowd: 40,758)
2.5 (17); 7.11 (53); 11.13 (79); 17.20 (122)	Q1; Q2; Q3; Final	4.3 (27); 7.4 (46); 12.9 (81); 15.10 (100)	Umpires: Ross Capes; Simpson Medal: Gary Gibellini (East Fremantle); David Pretty (Perth) (tied)
Nicholls 4, Avery 3, Durnthaler 2, Melrose 2, Hollins, McHenry, Reid, Becu, Buhagiar, Peake	Goals	Wiley 6, Doherty 5, Farrant 2, Rosbender, McPhee
Peake, Gibellini, Becu, Ferguson, Hollins, Nicholls, Melrose	Best	Wiley, Pretty, McPhee, Lofts, Doherty, Currie, Inman
East Fremantle win their first flag for nine years after a period in the doldrums, more convincingly than the scores indicated due to inaccuracy and a let-up in the final few minutes.
