= 1975 WANFL season =

Australian rules football season

- Teams: 8
- Premiers: West Perth; 15th premiership
- Minor premiers: West Perth; 8th minor premiership
- Sandover Medallist: Alan Quartermaine (East Perth)
- Leading goalkicker: Murray Couper (Perth)
- Matches played: 88

The 1975 WANFL season was the 91st season of senior Australian rules football in Perth and the forty-fifth as the "Western Australian National Football League". The season saw West Perth, after unexpectedly falling to last in 1974, rise under former Fitzroy coach Graham Campbell to a remarkable premiership win over South Fremantle by a record 104 points in front of what was then the biggest WANFL crowd on record and has since been only exceeded by the 1979 Grand Final. The Bulldogs, apart from Claremont the least successful WANFL club between 1957 and 1974, rose with arrival of Aboriginal stars Stephen Michael and Maurice Rioli to their first finals appearance in five years and began their greatest era since their golden days of the middle 1950s. With East Perth, revitalised after injuries affected their 1974 campaign, and the inconsistent but at times incomparable Swan Districts, they comprised a top four that remained unchanged for the final fourteen rounds.

East Fremantle, plagued by injuries to Doug Green and a broken wrist for Brian Peake during the first game against West Perth, falling from premiers to fifth and Perth after a slow start of five consecutive losses from runners-up to sixth. Subiaco fell from fourth to second-last and begun a bleak era with no subsequent finals appearance until 1985, but owing to the loss of Featherby, Robertson and Fitzpatrick to retirement or the VFL, critics before the season generally predicted this. Despite recruiting champion East Perth and Richmond player and coach Mal Brown, Claremont collected their fourteenth and to this date last wooden spoon by an equal-record six clear games, as Brown set a record of fifteen matches suspended during the season – beating another Tiger recruit from East Perth in "Nails" Western forty-three seasons previously.

== Home-and-away season ==
=== Round 1 ===
	Round 1
Saturday, 5 April	Perth 16.8 (104)	def. by	Swan Districts 17.15 (117)	Lathlain Park (crowd: 11753)
Saturday, 5 April	West Perth 13.13 (91)	def. by	East Perth 14.13 (97)	Leederville Oval (crowd: 13771)
Saturday, 5 April	Claremont 9.11 (65)	def. by	Subiaco 19.15 (129)	Claremont Oval (crowd: 8316)
Saturday, 5 April	East Fremantle 15.16 (106)	def.	South Fremantle 14.14 (98)	East Fremantle Oval (crowd: 13876)
The opening round attendance of 47,716 was a WAFL record beating the 45,525 who attended the opening day of 1968.

=== Round 2 ===
	Round 2
Saturday, 12 April	South Fremantle 17.18 (120)	def.	East Perth 9.11 (65)	Fremantle Oval (crowd: 11368)
Saturday, 12 April	Subiaco 13.20 (98)	def.	Perth 11.12 (78)	Subiaco Oval (crowd: 9675)
Saturday, 12 April	Swan Districts 19.17 (131)	def.	Claremont 9.11 (65)	Bassendean Oval (crowd: 11635)
Saturday, 12 April	West Perth 14.16 (100)	def.	East Fremantle 12.5 (77)	Leederville Oval (crowd: 10726)
South Fremantle's great speed demolished the taller Royal team, whilst veteran Bob Carson held a ruck division previously viewed too weak.

=== Round 3 ===
	Round 3
Saturday, 19 April	South Fremantle 18.24 (132)	def.	Perth 15.11 (101)	Fremantle Oval (crowd: 10320)
Saturday, 19 April	East Perth 12.9 (81)	def. by	Subiaco 13.8 (86)	Perth Oval (crowd: 10336)
Saturday, 19 April	Claremont 9.12 (66)	def. by	West Perth 14.9 (93)	Claremont Oval (crowd: 7158)
Saturday, 19 April	Swan Districts 23.15 (153)	def.	East Fremantle 11.11 (77)	Bassendean Oval (crowd: 10790)
Swans' high-power attacking football led by Brian Close and veteran Bill Walker's old-fashioned drop and stab kicks moves the club to early premiership favouritism.

=== Round 4 (Anzac Day) ===
	Round 4
Friday, 25 April	Subiaco 10.13 (73)	def. by	West Perth 14.11 (95)	Subiaco Oval (crowd: 15889)
Saturday, 26 April	Swan Districts 12.13 (85)	def. by	South Fremantle 18.15 (123)	Bassendean Oval (crowd: 18278)
Saturday, 26 April	Perth 13.16 (94)	def. by	East Perth 20.12 (132)	Lathlain Park (crowd: 10098)
Saturday, 26 April	East Fremantle 18.25 (133)	def.	Claremont 8.9 (57)	East Fremantle Oval (crowd: 7772)
In Bill Dempsey's 300th WANFL match, West Perth end Subiaco's unexpected unbeaten beginning. David Parkin, now cleared from Hawthorn, plays in the reserves whilst coaching Subiaco's league team.; The crowd of 15,889 was then a record for a home-and-away game at Subiaco Oval.; After Walker left the field, Swans had no answer to the pace of South Fremantle, who took their place at the top.

=== Round 5 ===
	Round 5
Saturday, 3 May	West Perth 18.10 (118)	def.	Perth 13.19 (97)	Leederville Oval (crowd: 9242)
Saturday, 3 May	East Perth 23.15 (153)	def.	Swan Districts 16.9 (105)	Perth Oval (crowd: 13596)
Saturday, 3 May	Claremont 10.12 (72)	def. by	South Fremantle 21.15 (141)	Claremont Oval (crowd: 8707)
Saturday, 3 May	East Fremantle 13.26 (104)	def.	Subiaco 13.4 (82)	East Fremantle Oval (crowd: 8759)

=== Round 6 ===
	Round 6
Saturday, 10 May	Swan Districts 9.6 (60)	def. by	West Perth 18.12 (120)	Bassendean Oval (crowd: 13340)
Saturday, 10 May	South Fremantle 16.19 (115)	def.	Subiaco 6.16 (52)	Fremantle Oval (crowd: 11735)
Saturday, 10 May	East Perth 18.14 (122)	def.	Claremont 10.11 (71)	Perth Oval (crowd: 7756)
Saturday, 10 May	Perth 19.15 (129)	def.	East Fremantle 16.9 (105)	Lathlain Park (crowd: 8565)
West Perth kick ten unanswered goals after being only two points ahead to demolish Swan Districts in the last quarter.

=== Round 7 ===
	Round 7
Saturday, 17 May	Subiaco 17.12 (114)	def.	Swan Districts 12.13 (85)	Subiaco Oval (crowd: 8284)
Saturday, 17 May	West Perth 18.15 (123)	def.	South Fremantle 9.13 (67)	Leederville Oval (crowd: 18974)
Saturday, 17 May	Claremont 9.10 (64)	def. by	Perth 15.14 (104)	Claremont Oval (crowd: 6457)
Saturday, 17 May	East Fremantle 19.13 (127)	def. by	East Perth 19.16 (130)	East Fremantle Oval (crowd: 9199)
Subiaco use gold guernseys with maroon lions for the first time, after their maroon ones with gold lion were partially missing and the published number sequence broken.

=== Round 8 ===
	Round 8
Saturday, 24 May	Perth 26.10 (166)	def.	South Fremantle 11.15 (81)	Lathlain Park (crowd: 9880)
Saturday, 24 May	Subiaco 9.13 (67)	def. by	East Perth 17.17 (119)	Subiaco Oval (crowd: 10937)
Saturday, 24 May	West Perth 13.19 (97)	def.	Claremont 13.3 (81)	Leederville Oval (crowd: 6971)
Saturday, 24 May	East Fremantle 20.16 (136)	def. by	Swan Districts 26.12 (168)	East Fremantle Oval (crowd: 8239)
Murray Couper kicks thirteen goals in a surprise thrashing, the equal second largest tally by any Perth player behind Albert Gook's sixteen against West Perth in 1939.

=== Round 9 (Foundation Day) ===
	Round 9
Saturday, 31 May	Swan Districts 8.21 (69)	def.	Perth 9.10 (64)	Bassendean Oval (crowd: 11435)
Saturday, 31 May	Subiaco 6.11 (47)	def. by	Claremont 10.7 (67)	Subiaco Oval (crowd: 7370)
Monday, 2 June	East Perth 13.11 (89)	def. by	West Perth 17.7 (109)	Perth Oval (crowd: 20363)
Monday, 2 June	South Fremantle 15.12 (102)	def. by	East Fremantle 19.21 (135)	Fremantle Oval (crowd: 16865)
On the first really wet day of the season, Swan Districts defeat Perth at Bassendean for the first time since April 1967, ending an 11-match winning streak that remains the second-longest at the ground and the longest until 2007.

=== Round 10 ===
	Round 10
Saturday, 7 June	East Perth 15.8 (98)	def. by	South Fremantle 15.14 (104)	Perth Oval (crowd: 8823)
Saturday, 7 June	Perth 11.15 (81)	def.	Subiaco 7.7 (49)	Lathlain Park (crowd: 7390)
Saturday, 7 June	Claremont 3.12 (30)	def. by	Swan Districts 15.22 (112)	Claremont Oval (crowd: 8220)
Saturday, 7 June	East Fremantle 18.16 (124)	def.	West Perth 16.12 (108)	East Fremantle Oval (crowd: 10593)
Claremont do not kick their first goal until time-on in the third quarter, and kick their lowest score for thirty years. Only inaccuracy by full-forward Max George, who kicked 4.7 (31), saves them from further humiliation.

=== Round 11 ===
	Round 11
Saturday, 14 June	West Perth 18.21 (129)	def.	Subiaco 14.10 (94)	Leederville Oval (crowd: 6967)
Saturday, 14 June	South Fremantle 18.18 (126)	def.	Swan Districts 13.18 (96)	Fremantle Oval (crowd: 8501)
Saturday, 14 June	East Perth 20.11 (131)	def.	Perth 15.16 (106)	Perth Oval (crowd: 7860)
Saturday, 14 June	Claremont 12.13 (85)	def. by	East Fremantle 13.16 (94)	Claremont Oval (crowd: 4960)

=== Round 12 ===
	Round 12
Saturday, 21 June	Perth 18.16 (124)	def.	West Perth 9.7 (61)	Lathlain Park (crowd: 9056)
Saturday, 21 June	Swan Districts 16.18 (114)	def.	East Perth 8.16 (64)	Bassendean Oval (crowd: 11370)
Saturday, 21 June	South Fremantle 19.27 (141)	def.	Claremont 11.12 (78)	Fremantle Oval (crowd: 9606)
Saturday, 21 June	Subiaco 16.17 (113)	def.	East Fremantle 13.21 (99)	Subiaco Oval (crowd: 7418)

=== Round 13 ===
	Round 13
Saturday, 28 June	West Perth 20.9 (129)	def.	Swan Districts 10.11 (71)	Leederville Oval (crowd: 11986)
Saturday, 28 June	Subiaco 11.11 (77)	def. by	South Fremantle 12.17 (89)	Subiaco Oval (crowd: 9076)
Saturday, 28 June	Claremont 11.24 (90)	def. by	East Perth 15.11 (101)	Claremont Oval (crowd: 7252)
Saturday, 28 June	East Fremantle 9.7 (61)	def. by	Perth 15.17 (107)	East Fremantle Oval (crowd: 8505)
West Perth hold top position by showing that Swan Districts' reliance on height and weight could not beat the Cardinals' superior skill.; Rovers Wiley and Mitsopoulos exploit a dominant Demon ruck for the Demons' first win at East Fremantle since 1970 and move the Demons within a game of the top four.

Rodney Burnby does ACL and doesn't play the rest of the season.

=== Round 14 ===
	Round 14
Saturday, 5 July	Swan Districts 19.22 (136)	def.	Subiaco 16.13 (109)	Bassendean Oval (crowd: 8970)
Saturday, 5 July	East Perth 19.11 (125)	def.	East Fremantle 17.19 (121)	Perth Oval (crowd: 10152)
Saturday, 12 July	South Fremantle 15.19 (109)	def.	West Perth 13.7 (85)	Fremantle Oval (crowd: 11253)
Saturday, 12 July	Perth 8.18 (66)	def. by	Claremont 11.10 (76)	Lathlain Park (crowd: 7092)
Instead of a week's break during interstate games, the WANFL experimented with the VFL practice of a "split round" over two weekends, but the experiment was not persisted with.; At odds of 7/1 against, Claremont win against a strong breeze by holding the in-form Perth, who earlier recorded seven consecutive behinds during the second quarter.

=== Round 15 ===
	Round 15
Saturday, 19 July	Perth 13.10 (88)	def. by	Swan Districts 13.14 (92)	Lathlain Park (crowd: 7321)
Saturday, 19 July	East Perth 16.20 (116)	def.	West Perth 8.14 (62)	Perth Oval (crowd: 9010)
Saturday, 19 July	Claremont 16.14 (110)	def.	Subiaco 9.22 (76)	Claremont Oval (crowd: 5018)
Saturday, 19 July	East Fremantle 11.14 (80)	def. by	South Fremantle 17.19 (121)	East Fremantle Oval (crowd: 9643)
A week of studying coaching tactics with future champion Essendon coach Kevin Sheedy pays off for the Royals, whose get-the-ball tactics given them eleven free kicks for holding-the ball in the first quarter and carry on to knock West Perth from top position.

=== Round 16 ===
	Round 16
Saturday, 26 July	South Fremantle 17.19 (121)	def.	East Perth 10.18 (78)	Fremantle Oval (crowd: 12629)
Saturday, 26 July	Subiaco 15.10 (100)	def.	Perth 13.11 (89)	Subiaco Oval (crowd: 5,140)
Saturday, 26 July	Swan Districts 16.15 (111)	def.	Claremont 11.7 (73)	Bassendean Oval (crowd: 7620)
Saturday, 26 July	West Perth 14.23 (107)	def.	East Fremantle 9.13 (67)	Leederville Oval (crowd: 7017)
An all-in-brawl at Fremantle Oval after an altercation on the half-time siren, in which Bulldog captain Ciccosto is hit by an onlooker, is followed by a 10.7 to 0.5 third quarter by South Fremantle who move clear on top.

=== Round 17 ===
	Round 17
Saturday, 2 August	South Fremantle 12.17 (89)	def. by	Perth 14.15 (99)	Fremantle Oval (crowd: 8575)
Saturday, 2 August	East Perth 18.22 (130)	def.	Subiaco 14.4 (88)	Perth Oval (crowd: 7236)
Saturday, 2 August	Claremont 13.10 (88)	def. by	West Perth 15.18 (108)	Claremont Oval (crowd: 7249)
Saturday, 2 August	Swan Districts 29.20 (194)	def.	East Fremantle 14.13 (97)	Bassendean Oval (crowd: 7320)
Swan Districts kick their highest score on record to that point, beating a previous record from 1961 against South Fremantle. Their 11.7 (73) is still the largest last-quarter score at Bassendean Oval. Brian Close, playing as a rover, kicked ten goals – still a record for Swans against East Fremantle.

=== Round 18 ===
	Round 18
Saturday, 9 August	Subiaco 14.10 (94)	def.	West Perth 10.22 (82)	Subiaco Oval (crowd: 6561)
Saturday, 9 August	Swan Districts 19.11 (125)	def.	South Fremantle 9.10 (64)	Bassendean Oval (crowd: 12761)
Saturday, 9 August	Perth 14.18 (102)	def.	East Perth 12.12 (84)	Lathlain Park (crowd: 7487)
Saturday, 9 August	East Fremantle 23.19 (157)	def.	Claremont 11.7 (73)	East Fremantle Oval (crowd: 4520)

=== Round 19 ===
	Round 19
Saturday, 16 August	West Perth 13.14 (92)	def.	Perth 12.5 (77)	Leederville Oval (crowd: 7020)
Saturday, 16 August	East Perth 12.16 (88)	def.	Swan Districts 9.18 (72)	Perth Oval (crowd: 8561)
Saturday, 16 August	Claremont 10.11 (71)	def. by	South Fremantle 11.19 (85)	Claremont Oval (crowd: 4617)
Saturday, 16 August	East Fremantle 10.16 (76)	def.	Subiaco 9.6 (60)	East Fremantle Oval (crowd: 3447)
In wet conditions, East Perth trail 2.4 (16) to 7.7 (49) during the second quarter, but hold Swan Districts goalless after half-time as Peter Spencer and Larry Kickett established an iron grip on the middle of the ground. It would become the last time a WA(N)FL team was goalless in the second half until 1983.

=== Round 20 ===
	Round 20
Saturday, 23 August	Swan Districts 22.13 (145)	def.	West Perth 5.9 (39)	Bassendean Oval (crowd: 8750)
Saturday, 23 August	South Fremantle 9.7 (61)	def. by	Subiaco 13.17 (95)	Fremantle Oval (crowd: 5078)
Saturday, 23 August	East Perth 19.15 (129)	def.	Claremont 11.16 (82)	Perth Oval (crowd: 5048)
Saturday, 23 August	Perth 10.14 (74)	def. by	East Fremantle 13.9 (87)	Lathlain Park (crowd: 3727)
With Garry Sidebottom exploiting West Perth's lack of physical strength to dominate the ruck and kick five goals resting in attack, Swan Districts muster a superb win in mud and rain to take top position ahead of the other three finalists by percentage.; West Perth's score remains their lowest against Swan Districts, and until 1983 was the lowest by any visiting team at Bassendean Oval.

=== Round 21 ===
	Round 21
Saturday, 30 August	Subiaco 19.17 (131)	def.	Swan Districts 15.14 (104)	Subiaco Oval (crowd: 10048)
Saturday, 30 August	West Perth 20.19 (139)	def.	South Fremantle 16.14 (110)	Leederville Oval (crowd: 12260)
Saturday, 30 August	Claremont 16.18 (114)	def. by	Perth 22.14 (146)	Claremont Oval (crowd: 4288)
Saturday, 30 August	East Fremantle 17.30 (132)	def.	East Perth 19.8 (122)	East Fremantle Oval (crowd: 7973)
West Perth's win, with a forward line revitalised by Barry Day and Norm Knell, jumps them from fourth to top as the other two finalists lose. The Cardinals were to beat their highest score for 1975 in each of their final three matches.; Subiaco send Peter Burton out a winner, (Note: Burton would return briefly in 1976 to help the struggling Lions.) as the retiring ruckman dominates Swans' danger players Sidebottom and Bob Beecroft.; East Fremantle's win is the biggest with two fewer goals in WA(N)FL history. It is the most recent senior WA(N)FL win with two fewer goals, though in 1984 South Fremantle won with three fewer goals.

== Ladder ==
1975 WANFL ladder
Pos	Team	Pld	W	L	D	PF	PA	PP	Pts
1	West Perth (P)	21	14	7	0	2087	1926	108.4	56
2	Swan Districts	21	13	8	0	2345	1994	117.6	52
3	East Perth	21	13	8	0	2254	2064	109.2	52
4	South Fremantle	21	13	8	0	2199	2026	108.5	52
5	East Fremantle	21	10	11	0	2195	2308	95.1	40
6	Perth	21	9	12	0	2096	1952	107.4	36
7	Subiaco	21	9	12	0	1834	1995	91.9	36
8	Claremont	21	3	18	0	1578	2323	67.9	12

Rules for classification: 1) points; 2) percentage; 3) number of points for.
(P) Premiers

== Finals ==
=== First semi-final ===
	First semi-final
Saturday, 6 September	East Perth 10.14 (74)	def. by	South Fremantle 21.13 (139)	Subiaco Oval (crowd: 25,570)
Bob Carson's defeat of Ron Alexander and the roving of Ciccosto and Maurice Rioli overwhelm a Royal side decimated by the tactical gamble of alternating centreman Spencer as a rover.

=== Second semi-final ===
	Second semi-final
Saturday, 13 September	West Perth 20.22 (142)	def.	Swan Districts 8.16 (64)	Subiaco Oval (crowd: 29,015)
A brilliant first half, including 88 possessions to a mere 49 in the first quarter against the wind, gives West Perth revenge for their Round 20 caning.

=== Preliminary final ===
	Preliminary final
Saturday, 20 September	Swan Districts 12.21 (93)	def. by	South Fremantle 15.16 (106)	Subiaco Oval (crowd: 23,986)
Swans' wasteful 3.11 (29) with the wind in the first quarter and the dominance of South Fremantle ruck-rover Eddie Bauskis decides a low-standard if tough match.

=== Grand Final ===
1975 WANFL Grand Final
Saturday, 27 September	West Perth	def.	South Fremantle	Subiaco Oval (crowd: 52,322)
5.1 (31); 9.6 (60); 13.12 (90); 23.17 (155)	Q1; Q2; Q3; Final	3.2 (20); 4.6 (30); 7.8 (50); 7.9 (51)	Umpires: Ross Capes; Simpson Medal: Mel Whinnen (West Perth)
Day 8, Watling 5, Knell 4, Smeath 4, Wilson, Hillier	Goals	Ray Bauskis 3, Eddie Bauskis, Haddow, Rioli, Ciccotosto
Whinnen, Dempsey, Watling, Hillier, Prunster, Sheridan, Smeath, Logan	Best	Barrett, Eddie Bauskis, McKay, Haddow, Magro, Carson
In front of a record Grand Final crowd, West Perth, with veterans Whinnen and Dempsey dominating their on-ball division, overwhelm South Fremantle in the second half to record the largest Grand Final win on record.
