= Murray Couper =

Australian rules footballer

Personal information
- Full name: Murray Stephen Couper
- Born: 24 October 1948 (age 78)
- Original team: Dowerin

Playing career^{1}
Years	Club	Games (Goals)
1971–1979	Perth	134 (459)
1980	East Perth	14 (45)
1981	East Fremantle	3 (5)
- ^{1} Playing statistics correct to the end of 1981.

Murray Stephen Couper (born 24 October 1948) is a former Australian rules football player best known for playing for Perth in the Western Australian National Football League.

== Playing career ==
Couper began his playing career with Dowerin before moving to Perth. He made his senior debut for Perth in 1971. He won the Bernie Naylor Medal in 1975 and played in the 1976 and 1977 premiership-winning Perth teams, but missed the 1978 Grand Final when he was suspended for throwing the ball in an umpire's face after believing himself wrongly denied a free kick for holding the ball during the second semi.

In 1980 he moved to East Perth where he played a single season. The following year he transferred to East Fremantle, playing just three matches.

== Post-playing career ==
Helping Scotch College XVIII and Perth Football Club.
