= Phil Doherty =

Australian rules footballer

Personal information
- Full name: Phillip Carl Doherty
- Born: 10 April 1951 (age 75)
- Original team: Wangaratta Rovers
- Height: 191 cm (6 ft 3 in)
- Weight: 89 kg (196 lb)

Playing career^{1}
Years	Club	Games (Goals)
1972–73	North Melbourne	11 (19)
1974–75	Perth	29 (49)
- ^{1} Playing statistics correct to the end of 1973.

Phillip Carl Doherty (born 10 April 1951) is a former Australian rules footballer who played with North Melbourne in the Victorian Football League (VFL).

Doherty played a spectacular match for the Wangaratta Rovers in their 1971 Ovens & Murray Football League grand final win, kicking three goals.

Doherty was part of the Barry Cable transfer deal from Perth to North Melbourne in late 1973 and Doherty managed to kick 5 goals, 6 behinds in Perth's losing 1974 WAFNL Grand Final.
