= Ray Bauskis =

Australian rules footballer

Personal information
- Full name: Raymond Valdi Bauskis
- Born: 17 June 1954 (age 72)
- Position: Full forward

Playing career
| Years | Club | Games (Goals) |
| 1972–1980 | South Fremantle | 117 (436) |

Representative team honours
| Years | Team | Games (Goals) |
| 1976 | Western Australia | 1 (2) |

Career highlights
- WAFL leading goalkicker: 1977, 1978; South Fremantle leading goalkicker: 1974, 1975, 1976, 1977, 1978, 1979

Raymond Valdi Bauskis (born 17 June 1954) is an Australian rules footballer who played for the South Fremantle Football Club in the Western Australian National Football League (WANFL) between 1972 and 1980. He was the leading goalkicker in the league for the 1977 and 1978 WANFL seasons, and played in losing grand finals in 1975 and 1979.

Bauskis made his senior debut for South Fremantle in round thirteen of the 1972 season. His first full season was 1974, where he kicked 34 goals from 13 games to finish as the club's leading goalkicker. He repeated this feat for another five consecutive seasons, ending his career in 1980 with 436 goals from 117 games. The most goals Bauskis ever kicked in a single game was 13, against Subiaco in round 11 of the 1979 season. He twice won the Bernie Naylor Medal as the league's leading goalkicker, with 107 goals in 1977 and 83 goals in 1978. Bauskis only ever played in one interstate game, kicking two goals for Western Australia against Victoria in 1976. He played that game alongside his older brother Eddie, who played for South Fremantle and Swan Districts.
