= Dean Herbert (footballer) =

Australian rules footballer

Personal information
- Full name: Dean Herbert
- Born: 24 January 1956 (age 70)
- Height: 198 cm (6 ft 6 in)
- Weight: 99 kg (218 lb)
- Position: Ruck

Playing career^{1}
Years	Club	Games (Goals)
1979–81	St Kilda	22 (23)
- ^{1} Playing statistics correct to the end of 1981.

Dean Herbert (born 24 January 1956) is a former Australian rules footballer who played with St Kilda in the Victorian Football League (VFL).
