= Wayne Otway =

Australian rules footballer

Personal information
- Full name: Wayne Kenneth Otway
- Born: 24 June 1956 (age 70)
- Original team: East Perth (WAFL)
- Draft: No. 8, 1981 interstate draft
- Height: 168 cm (5 ft 6 in)
- Weight: 73 kg (161 lb)

Playing career^{1}
| Years | Club | Games (Goals) |
| 1975 | Swan Districts (WAFL) | 1 (0) |
| 1976–1986 | East Perth (WAFL) | 143 (231) |
| 1982–1983 | Essendon (VFL) | 36 (65) |
| Total | | 180 (296) |
- ^{1} Playing statistics correct to the end of 1986.

Wayne Kenneth Otway (born 24 June 1956) is a former Australian rules footballer who played with Essendon in the Victorian Football League (VFL).

Otway was unable to play a WANFL game while at Swan Districts and had to wait until he switched to East Perth to make his senior debut. He was a member of East Perth's 1978 premiership team and in 1980 won their "Best and Fairest" the F. D. Book Medal.

He was already 25 years old when he made the move to Essendon and would spend two seasons with the club.

In 1982, his first season, he amassed 440 disposals at an average of 20 per game. A rover, he missed only one game during the season and was Essendon's second most prolific goal-kicker with 46 goals, three short of Simon Madden. He had played one of his best games when he made his debut in the opening round of the season, against Footscray at Windy Hill. Essendon won by 109 points, with Otway contributing 28 disposals and five goals. His last appearance in 1982 was an elimination final, where he was inaccurate with one goal and four behinds. In the Brownlow Medal count at the end of the year, he finished with nine votes, the equal third most by an Essendon player.

Injuries meant he played only 14 games in 1983, but he still found a lot of the ball, averaging just under 19 disposals. He finished his career back in Western Australia with East Perth.
