= Robert Wiley =

Australian rules footballer (born 1955)

Personal information
- Full name: Robert John Wiley
- Born: 24 March 1955 (age 71); Kalgoorlie, Western Australia
- Original team: Manning JFC / Scotch College
- Height: 178 cm (5 ft 10 in)
- Weight: 80 kg (176 lb)
- Position: Rover

Playing career^{1}
Years	Club	Games (Goals)
1974–78, 1984–88	Perth	174 (407) (Note: These tallies refer to premiership matches (home-and-away and finals matches) only.)
1979–1983	Richmond	95 (127)
1987	West Coast	18 (24)
Total		287 (558)

Representative team honours
Years	Team	Games (Goals)
1974–1986	Western Australia	14 (27)
	Victoria	2

Coaching career^{3}
Years	Club	Games (W–L–D)
1988–89	Perth	42 (20–22–0)
1998	Western Australia	1 (0–1–0)
2016–2018	East Fremantle	58 (14–44–0)
- ^{1} Playing statistics correct to the end of 1989.^{3} Coaching statistics correct as of 2018.

Career highlights
- VFL Premiership player: (1980); 2× WANFL Premiership player: (1976, 1977); 8× Perth best and fairest: (1974, 1975, 1976, 1977, 1978, 1984, 1985, 1986); 2× Perth leading goalkicker: (1976, 1977); Perth captain: (1985–1986); All-Australian team: 1986; West Australian Football Hall of Fame, inducted 2004; Australian Football Hall of Fame, inducted 2021

Robert John Wiley (born 24 March 1955) is a former Australian rules footballer who played for the Perth Football Club in the West Australian Football League (WAFL) and for the Richmond Football Club and West Coast Eagles in the Victorian Football League (VFL).

An inaugural member of the West Australian Football Hall of Fame, Wiley is regarded as one of the finest rovers of his era. He later coached Perth and East Fremantle, and was an assistant coach at West Coast.

== Career ==
Born in Kalgoorlie, and educated at Scotch College, Wiley was zoned to Perth in the WANFL, making his debut for them in 1974 at the age of 19. He won the Butcher Medal as Perth's best and fairest in his first season. He was a member of premiership sides in 1976 and 1977, and in that latter season kicked over eighty goals despite missing nine weeks through injury before the Grand Final. Remarkably for a rover, Wiley twice kicked ten goals in a match in 1977, including once against West Perth where he had forty-two possessions for ten goals and four behinds. An exceptionally pacy rover, Wiley played with Perth before and after his VFL stint and won a club record eight best and fairest awards in total. He finished with 174 senior games and coached the club in 1988 and 1989. In 2015, Wiley was inducted into the Perth Hall of Fame, as one of its four inaugural members of its elite 'Mighty Demons' category.

Richmond had recruited Wiley in 1979 and he played in their 1980 VFL Grand Final winning side. He kicked forty goals in 1982 and left the club the following season, returning to Western Australia where in 1987 he would return to the VFL for a season with the newly formed West Coast.

In 2021, Wiley was inducted into the Australian Football Hall of Fame and was inducted by former teammate and close friend Mick Malthouse.

== Coaching ==
After his season with West Coast, Wiley returned as coach of his old club Perth, succeeding Mal Brown. In his first season (1988), Wiley took the Demons to their second season with more wins than losses since the 1978 WANFL season, and they were unlucky not to make the finals, losing out only when South Fremantle and East Fremantle beat top two sides Claremont and Subiaco in the final round after having been third for most of the season. The following year, however, Perth fell away to sixth after being last for a substantial period and Wiley's contract was not renewed. He still has the best win–loss record, however, of any coach of Perth since Ken Armstrong retired. Wiley later was the last State of Origin coach for Western Australian in 1998. He was for many years an assistant coach with former club West Coast, being a runner for the clubs first two premierships in 1992 and 1994 under his 1980 Richmond premiership teammate Mick Malthouse, he was an assistant to John Worsfold in the 2006 premiership win. At the end of 2012, Wiley reunited with Malthouse at Carlton. He was appointed to the role of director development and coaching.

After leaving Carlton, Wiley was appointed the coach of East Fremantle in the WAFL, for 2016 to 2018 seasons. In 2021, Wiley returned to West Coast as its WAFL team coach from the 2022 season, he is also the Eagles number 1 ticket holder for the 2021 and 2022 AFL seasons.
