= Peter Featherby =

Australian rules footballer (born 1951)

Personal information
- Full name: Peter Michael Featherby
- Born: 12 December 1951 (age 74)
- Original team: Wembley (WAAFL)
- Height: 183 cm (6 ft 0 in)
- Weight: 85 kg (13 st 5 lb)
- Position: Midfielder

Playing career^{1}
Years	Club	Games (Goals)
1970–74, 1977–79, 1984–88	Subiaco	196 (181) (Note: These tallies refer to premiership matches (home-and-away and finals matches) only.)
1975–76	Footscray	42 (15)
1979–83	Geelong	93 (79)
Total		331 (275)

Representative team honours
Years	Team	Games (Goals)
1973-1980	Western Australia	14 (7)
1980	Victoria	1
- ^{1} Playing statistics correct to the end of 1988.

Career highlights
- Geelong best and fairest: 1981; Simpson Medal, WA vs South Australia: 1973; Subiaco Premierships: 1973, 1986; Subiaco best and fairest: 1976, 1977; West Australian Football Hall of Fame, inducted 2007

Peter Michael Featherby (born 12 December 1951) is a former Australian rules footballer. He began his senior career with Subiaco Football Club in the West Australian Football League (WAFL), but he also played with two Victorian Football League (VFL) clubs.

Featherby's first stint in the VFL was with the Footscray Football Club, where he lasted only two seasons before moving back to Subiaco.

Geelong encouraged him to return to the VFL in 1979 he moved to the club and won the Carji Greeves Medal in 1981. A prolific ball-winner, he had the second highest confirmed possession game of all time, gathering 43 kicks, 8 handballs and 12 marks against Melbourne in round 16, 1981. Other unconfirmed reports say Featherby amassed 55 possessions for Footscray in 1975 and 56 against Fitzroy in 1983. Featherby left VFL football in 1983, but continued to play for Subiaco for the next five seasons, including in their 1986 premiership side, 13 years after his first premiership.

He also played 15 interstate matches, 14 for Western Australia and one for Victoria in 1980. He was inducted into the West Australian Football Hall of Fame and named as Subiaco's Legend in 2007.
