= 1940 Hawthorn Football Club season =

16th season in the Victorian Football League

Hawthorn Football Club
1940 season
- President: Dr. Jacob Jano
- Coach: Bert Mills
- Captain: Bert Mills
- Home ground: Glenferrie Oval
- Patriotic Premiership: 1st Round
- VFL Season: 7–11 (9th)
- Finals Series: Did not qualify
- Best and Fairest: Andy Angwin
- Leading goalkicker: Alby Naismith (25)
- Highest home attendance: 16,000 (Round 3 vs. Richmond
- Lowest home attendance: 5,500 (Round 18 vs. Fitzroy
- Average home attendance: 9.833

The 1940 season was the Hawthorn Football Club's 16th season in the Victorian Football League and 39th overall.

== Fixture ==
=== Patriotic Premiership ===
The VFL between Rounds 14 and 15 played a one-day lightning carnival, Known as the Patriotic Premiership, at the Melbourne Cricket Ground to raise money for the Patriotic Fund. The matches played were twenty minutes long with no time-on.

Rd	Date and local time	Opponent	Scores (Hawthorn's scores indicated in bold)			Venue	Attendance
Rd	Date and local time	Opponent	Home	Away	Result	Venue	Attendance
1	Saturday, 3 August	St Kilda	**2.2 (14)**	3.2 (20)	Lost by 6 points	Melbourne Cricket Ground (H)	

=== Premiership Season ===
Rd	Date and local time	Opponent	Scores (Hawthorn's scores indicated in bold)			Venue	Attendance	Record
Rd	Date and local time	Opponent	Home	Away	Result	Venue	Attendance	Record
1	Saturday, 27 April (2:45 pm)	North Melbourne	**25.11 (161)**	13.11 (89)	Won by 72 points	Glenferrie Oval (H)	14,000	1–0
2	Saturday, 4 May (2:45 pm)	St Kilda	12.25 (97)	**7.13 (55)**	Lost by 42 points	Junction Oval (A)	17,000	1–1
3	Saturday, 11 May (2:45 pm)	Richmond	**15.12 (102)**	19.15 (129)	Lost by 27 points	Glenferrie Oval (H)	16,000	1–2
4	Saturday, 18 May (2:45 pm)	South Melbourne	22.13 (145)	**16.10 (106)**	Lost by 39 points	Lake Oval (A)	9,000	1–3
5	Saturday, 25 May (2:45 pm)	Essendon	12.18 (90)	**9.19 (73)**	Lost by 17 points	Windy Hill (A)	12,000	1–4
6	Saturday, 1 June (2:30 pm)	Melbourne	**12.15 (87)**	11.15 (81)	Won by 6 points	Glenferrie Oval (H)	8,000	2–4
7	Saturday, 8 June (2:30 pm)	Fitzroy	17.11 (113)	**12.14 (86)**	Lost by 27 points	Brunswick Street Oval (A)	7,000	2–5
8	Saturday, 15 June (2:30 pm)	Footscray	**8.17 (65)**	15.20 (110)	Lost by 45 points	Glenferrie Oval (H)	10,000	2–6
9	Saturday, 22 June (2:30 pm)	Geelong	12.18 (90)	**6.10 (46)**	Lost by 44 points	Corio Oval (A)	4,000	2–7
10	Saturday, 29 June (2:30 pm)	Carlton	13.11 (89)	**13.18 (96)**	Won by 7 points	Princes Park (A)	10,000	3–7
11	Saturday, 6 July (2:30 pm)	Collingwood	**10.17 (77)**	14.17 (101)	Lost by 24 points	Glenferrie Oval (H)	10,000	3–8
12	Saturday, 13 July (2:30 pm)	North Melbourne	11.11 (77)	**9.16 (70)**	Lost by 7 points	Arden Street Oval (A)	3,000	3–9
13	Saturday, 20 July (2:30 pm)	St Kilda	**17.17 (119)**	8.15 (63)	Won by 56 points	Glenferrie Oval (H)	8,000	4–9
14	Saturday, 27 July (2:30 pm)	Richmond	11.13 (79)	**12.15 (87)**	Won by 8 points	Punt Road Oval (A)	9,000	5–9
15	Saturday, 10 August (2:45 pm)	South Melbourne	**10.19 (79)**	10.13 (73)	Won by 6 points	Glenferrie Oval (H)	8,000	6–9
16	Saturday, 17 August (2:45 pm)	Essendon	**11.8 (84)**	18.12 (120)	Lost by 36 points	Glenferrie Oval (H)	9,000	6–10
17	Saturday, 24 August (2:45 pm)	Melbourne	26.20 (176)	**8.14 (62)**	Lost by 114 points	Melbourne Cricket Ground (A)	8,722	6–11
18	Saturday, 31 August (2:45 pm)	Fitzroy	**13.16 (94)**	5.8 (38)	Won by 56 points	Glenferrie Oval (H)	5,500	7–11

== Ladder ==
(P)	Premiers
	Qualified for finals

#	Team	P	W	L	D	PF	PA	%	Pts
1	Melbourne (P)	18	14	4	0	2110	1677	125.8	56
2	Richmond	18	12	6	0	1787	1489	120.0	48
3	Essendon	18	12	6	0	1611	1489	108.2	48
4	Geelong	18	11	7	0	1645	1599	102.9	44
5	Carlton	18	10	8	0	1730	1555	111.3	40
6	Footscray	18	9	9	0	1696	1558	108.9	36
7	Fitzroy	18	9	9	0	1443	1563	92.3	36
8	Collingwood	18	8	10	0	1621	1611	100.6	32
9	Hawthorn	18	7	11	0	1549	1760	88.0	28
10	South Melbourne	18	7	11	0	1480	1696	87.3	28
11	St Kilda	18	5	13	0	1418	1634	86.8	20
12	North Melbourne	18	4	14	0	1381	1840	75.1	16

Rules for classification: 1. premiership points; 2. percentage; 3. points for
Average score: 90.1
Source: AFL Tables
