= 1971 Rothmans Channel 7 Cup =

Tournament details
- Dates: 9–11 October 1971
- Teams: 8
- Venue(s): 1 (in 1 host city)

Final positions
- Champions: Hawthorn (1st title)
- Runners-up: Claremont

Tournament statistics
- Matches played: 12
- Attendance: 72,500 (6,042 per match)

The 1971 Rothmans Channel 7 Cup was a one-off WANFL-organised national club Australian rules football tournament between the leading clubs from the VFL, the SANFL and the WANFL.

The Tournament was held as a testimonial to celebrate Graham 'Polly' Farmer who was retiring at the end of the 1971 WANFL season, with the matches being played as Lightning matches of two 25 minute quarters with time-on.

== Qualified Teams ==
Team	Nickname	League	Qualification
Hawthorn	Hawks	VFL	Winners of the 1971 Victorian Football League
Richmond	Tigers	VFL	Third Place in the 1971 Victorian Football League^{1}
North Adelaide	Roosters	SANFL	Winners of the 1971 South Australian National Football League
Port Adelaide	Magpies	SANFL	Runners-Up in the 1971 South Australian National Football League
West Perth	Falcons	WANFL	Winners of the 1971 Western Australian National Football League
East Perth	Royals	WANFL	Runners-Up in the 1971 Western Australian National Football League
East Fremantle	Sharks	WANFL	Third Place in the 1971 Western Australian National Football League
Claremont	Tigers	WANFL	Fourth Place in the 1971 Western Australian National Football League

^{2} Replaced St Kilda, the 1971 Victorian Football League Runners-Up who declined to participate.

== Venues ==
Perth
Subiaco Oval
Capacity: 53,000
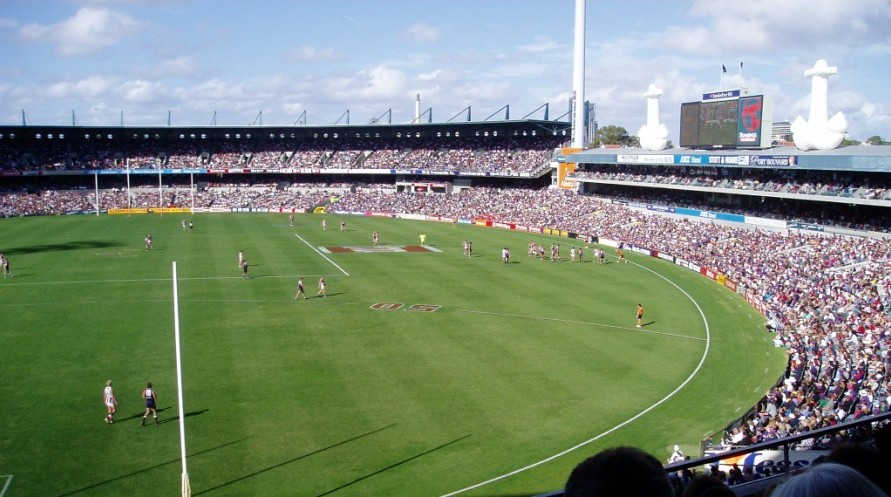

== Knockout stage ==
=== Round 1 ===
9 October 1971	Claremont	69-46	North Adelaide	Subiaco Oval, Perth
	11.3 (69)		7.4 (46)	Attendance: 20,000

9 October 1971	West Perth	34-33	East Fremantle	Subiaco Oval, Perth
	5.4 (34)		4.9 (33)	Attendance: 20,000

9 October 1971	Port Adelaide	57-56	Richmond	Subiaco Oval, Perth
	9.3 (57)		8.8 (56)	Attendance: 20,000

9 October 1971	Hawthorn	46-36	East Perth	Subiaco Oval, Perth
	7.4 (46)		5.6 (36)	Attendance: 20,000

=== Loser's playoffs ===
10 October 1971	Richmond	40-33	North Adelaide	Subiaco Oval, Perth
	6.4 (40)		5.3 (33)	Attendance: 15,000

10 October 1971	East Fremantle	59-23	East Perth	Subiaco Oval, Perth
	8.11 (59)		3.5 (23)	Attendance: 15,000

=== Semi-finals ===
SF #1 10 October 1971	Claremont	66-23	Port Adelaide	Subiaco Oval, Perth
	10.6 (66)		3.5 (23)	Attendance: 22,500

SF #2 10 October 1971	Hawthorn	40-13	West Perth	Subiaco Oval, Perth
	6.4 (40)		1.7 (13)	Attendance: 22,500

=== Ranking playoffs ===
7th Place Playoff 11 October 1971	East Perth	63-49	North Adelaide	Subiaco Oval, Perth
	9.9 (63)		7.7 (49)	Attendance: 25,000

5th Place Playoff 11 October 1971	Richmond	54-47	East Fremantle	Subiaco Oval, Perth
	7.12 (54)		7.5 (47)	Attendance: 25,000

3rd Place Playoff 11 October 1971	West Perth	39-19	Port Adelaide	Subiaco Oval, Perth
	5.9 (39)		2.7 (19)	Attendance: 30,000

=== Rothmans Channel 7 Cup final ===
Final 11 October 1971	Hawthorn	75-29	Claremont	Subiaco Oval, Perth
	7.1 (33); 12.3 (75)		0.1 (1); 4.5 (29)	Attendance: 30,000; Umpires: Murray Ducker
		Goals
	Hudson 5 Crimmins, Rice 2 Douge, Meagher, Martello 1		Evans 2 Carroll, Duperouzel 1
