= 1953 Hawthorn Football Club season =

29th season in the Victorian Football League

Hawthorn Football Club
1953 season
- President: Dave Prentice; Dr. A.S. Ferguson
- Coach: Jack Hale
- Captain: Ted Fletcher
- Home ground: Glenferrie Oval
- Lightning Premiership: Semifinals
- VFL Season: 3–15 (12th)
- Finals Series: Did not qualify
- Best and Fairest: Ted Fletcher
- Leading goalkicker: Kevin Coghlan (19)
- Highest home attendance: 14,000 (Round 14 vs. Geelong)
- Lowest home attendance: 5,000 (Round 18 vs. Fitzroy)
- Average home attendance: 9,667

The 1953 season was the Hawthorn Football Club's 29th season in the Victorian Football League and 52nd overall.

== Fixture ==
=== Lightning Premiership ===
The lightning premiership was played between rounds 6 and 7.

Rd	Date and local time	Opponent	Scores (Hawthorn's scores indicated in bold)			Venue	Attendance
Rd	Date and local time	Opponent	Home	Away	Result	Venue	Attendance
1	Tuesday, 2 June	North Melbourne	**3.5 (23)**	2.2 (14)	Won by 9 points	Melbourne Cricket Ground (H)	
Semifinal	Tuesday, 2 June	Richmond	**1.0 (6)**	1.1 (7)	Lost by 1 point	Melbourne Cricket Ground (H)	

=== Premiership Season ===
Rd	Date and local time	Opponent	Scores (Hawthorn's scores indicated in bold)			Venue	Attendance	Record
Rd	Date and local time	Opponent	Home	Away	Result	Venue	Attendance	Record
1	Saturday, 18 April (2:15 pm)	Geelong	12.15 (87)	**5.8 (38)**	Lost by 49 points	Kardinia Park (A)	19,877	0–1
2	Saturday, 2 May (2:15 pm)	St Kilda	**8.9 (57)**	13.14 (92)	Lost by 35 points	Glenferrie Oval (H)	12,000	0–2
3	Saturday, 9 May (2:15 pm)	Footscray	16.15 (111)	**6.6 (42)**	Lost by 69 points	Western Oval (A)	15,000	0–3
4	Saturday, 16 May (2:15 pm)	South Melbourne	**7.11 (53)**	9.9 (63)	Lost by 10 points	Glenferrie Oval (H)	12,000	0–4
5	Saturday, 23 May (2:15 pm)	Collingwood	13.18 (96)	**3.8 (26)**	Lost by 70 points	Victoria Park (A)	9,627	0–5
6	Saturday, 30 May (2:15 pm)	Carlton	**10.7 (67)**	6.11 (47)	Lost by 20 points	Glenferrie Oval (H)	12,000	1–5
7	Saturday, 6 June (2:15 pm)	Fitzroy	8.12 (60)	**5.14 (44)**	Lost by 16 points	Brunswick Street Oval (A)	9,500	1–6
8	Saturday, 13 June (2:15 pm)	North Melbourne	**8.14 (62)**	12.8 (80)	Lost by 18 points	Arden Street Oval (A)	7,000	1–7
9	Saturday, 20 June (2:15 pm)	Essendon	**9.10 (64)**	12.15 (87)	Lost by 23 points	Glenferrie Oval (H)	8,000	1–8
10	Saturday, 27 June (2:15 pm)	Melbourne	10.14 (74)	**16.6 (102)**	Won by 28 points	Melbourne Cricket Ground (A)	11,993	2–8
11	Saturday, 4 July (2:15 pm)	Richmond	12.10 (82)	**7.6 (48)**	Lost by 34 points	Punt Road Oval (A)	11,000	2–9
12	Saturday, 11 July (2:15 pm)	Geelong	**9.8 (62)**	12.14 (86)	Lost by 24 points	Glenferrie Oval (H)	14,000	2–10
13	Saturday, 25 July (2:15 pm)	St Kilda	9.13 (67)	**4.14 (38)**	Lost by 29 points	Junction Oval (A)	7,500	2–11
14	Saturday, 1 August (2:15 pm)	Footscray	**3.10 (28)**	11.10 (76)	Lost by 48 points	Glenferrie Oval (H)	10,000	2–12
15	Saturday, 8 August (2:15 pm)	South Melbourne	7.12 (54)	**9.8 (62)**	Won by 8 points	Lake Oval (A)	8,500	3–12
16	Saturday, 15 August (2:15 pm)	Collingwood	**11.6 (72)**	12.16 (88)	Lost by 16 points	Glenferrie Oval (H)	7,000	3–13
17	Saturday, 22 August (2:15 pm)	Carlton	12.15 (87)	**6.9 (45)**	Lost by 42 points	Princes Park (A)	8,500	3–14
18	Saturday, 29 August (2:15 pm)	Fitzroy	**9.10 (64)**	13.6 (84)	Lost by 20 points	Glenferrie Oval (H)	5,000	3–15

== Ladder ==
(P)	Premiers
	Qualified for finals

#	Team	P	W	L	D	PF	PA	%	Pts
1	Geelong	18	15	3	0	1546	1079	143.3	60
2	Collingwood (P)	18	14	4	0	1518	1229	123.5	56
3	Footscray	18	13	5	0	1309	959	136.5	52
4	Essendon	18	13	5	0	1529	1177	129.9	52
5	Carlton	18	10	8	0	1409	1310	107.6	40
6	Fitzroy	18	10	8	0	1208	1421	85.0	40
7	North Melbourne	18	9	9	0	1388	1287	107.8	36
8	South Melbourne	18	9	9	0	1385	1323	104.7	36
9	St Kilda	18	5	13	0	1065	1561	68.2	20
10	Richmond	18	3	14	1	1220	1501	81.3	14
11	Melbourne	18	3	14	1	1137	1420	80.1	14
12	Hawthorn	18	3	15	0	974	1421	68.5	12

Rules for classification: 1. premiership points; 2. percentage; 3. points for
Average score: 72.6
Source: AFL Tables
