= Lightning football =

Sport

Lightning football is a shortened variation of Australian rules football, often played at half the duration of a full match.

Lightning football is typically used as a means to accommodate a small tournament inside a single day or weekend, particularly at junior or amateur level; these tournaments are generally known as lightning premierships or lightning carnivals. At the top level of Australian rules football, lightning matches have most recently been staged as part of the Australian Football League pre-season competition.

Lightning football is distinct from AFLX, a different shortened variation of Australian rules football. Lightning football is not significantly different from standard Australian rules football other than the length of its games, while AFLX which is a heavily modified variant played on a smaller field with fewer players.

== Name ==
The use of the word lightning, as a synonym for "fast", to describe an Australian rules football tournament appears to have originated with the first lightning carnival staged by the South Australian National Football League (SANFL) in 1940. The term may have been adopted from its use in chess, which had used the word lightning in the same context for many years: "lightning chess" tournaments were seen in Australia from as early as 1909, and were played under modified rules in which players were allowed at most ten seconds to make each move, allowing an entire tournament to be completed in just a few hours.

In a preview of the 1940 SANFL Lightning Carnival, the Advertiser journalist Jim Handby discussed the suitability of the name; while he surmised that the choice of name was primarily due to the short time over which the premiership was decided, he speculated that the shortened matches could lead to a particularly high-paced style of gameplay.

The term "lightning premiership/carnival" has generally entered the Australian vernacular for a condensed carnival of shortened matches in any game or sport. The term was, for example, attributed to a 1945 South Australian seven-a-side rugby union tournament, long before the sport of rugby sevens was formally codified.

== Rules ==
Unlike other abbreviated sports, such as Twenty20 cricket, rugby sevens or Australian rules football's AFLX, lightning football is not a strictly codified sport in its own right. In many cases, the length of the game is the only difference in the rules between the full and lightning versions of the game; in other cases, some rules are modified for lightning matches.

Most commonly, lightning matches are played at half of the length of a regulation game. In the most recent lightning matches in the Australian Football League (AFL) pre-season competition, lightning matches are played over two halves, each lasting 20 minutes with time on, compared with the normal match length of four quarters each lasting 20 minutes with time-on. However, this varies from tournament to tournament, and the length is often simply adjusted based on the number of games required to be played and the time available to play them in.

In more recent incarnations of lightning football organised by the AFL, several experimental rules, many designed to speed up the game, have been trialled. The most notable variation was the introduction of a free kick paid against the last player to touch the ball before it goes out of bounds (except a spoil or smother), rather than restarting play with a boundary throw-in; this rule was used in the AFL's 1996 and 2011 lightning matches, and as revised in 2012 to penalise a player only if the last touch was a kick, handpass, or crossing the line while in possession of the ball.

== History ==
=== Early history ===
The concept of holding a one-day tournament of shortened Australian rules football matches dates as early as the 19th century. During a weekend's break in the 1896 VFA premiership season, a Charity Cup event was held in which four clubs – Essendon, Collingwood, South Melbourne and Port Melbourne – contested a knock-out tournament of shortened matches; as is the case in modern lightning premierships, new rules were trialled during the event.

=== World War II ===
Lightning premierships saw an increase in frequency around World War II, when many such events were staged as wartime fundraisers. The first occurred during 1940, the first football season following the outbreak of World War II. On 13 July 1940, the SANFL staged its "Lightning Football Carnival" at the Adelaide Oval, attracting a crowd of almost 17,500 people, with Sturt victorious; the carnival was an eight-team knock-out tournament, with each match played over two periods of 14 minutes each. The Victorian Football League then staged its version, known as the "Patriotic Premiership", on 3 August 1940, at the Melbourne Cricket Ground, attracting more than 30,000 people, and won by St Kilda; this was a twelve-team knock-out tournament, with each match lasting a single period of 20 minutes. Both tournaments were considered great successes, and both leagues held further wartime Lightning Premierships in 1941 and 1943.

In addition to the sport's two biggest leagues, the Tasmanian Australian National Football League (TANFL) held two wartime Lightning Premierships, both in 1941, and many smaller leagues also held events. Most notably, the Broken Hill Football League, staged a "Patriotic Premiership" on 6 July 1940, one week before the inaugural SANFL event, which consisted of a four-team knock-out tournament, with matches played at just under half-length (two periods of twenty minutes without time-on).

=== Post World War II ===
In the ten years following World War II, most of the major Australian rules football leagues sporadically held lightning premierships. Although there was no longer a war to fund, the events were still held as charity fundraisers. The SANFL was the most active proponent of lightning football, staging four post-war carnivals between 1946 and 1950; the VFL staged lightning premierships on public holidays in 1951 (Jubilee Day), 1952 (Empire Day) and 1953 (Coronation Day); and post-war lightning premierships were also staged by the Victorian Football Association (1946), the North Western Football Union (1951) and the TANFL (1953).

Since the 1950s, lightning football has been seen only occasionally at the top levels of the sport. Specific events have included:

- 1971: the Rothmans Channel 7 Cup, an eight-team knockout tournament of half-length games played over one weekend in October 1971. The tournament was staged in Perth as a testimonial to Polly Farmer, and featured four West Australian Football League teams and two teams each from the SANFL and VFL.
- 1972–1979: the VFA staged a post-season lightning premiership among teams from both divisions that failed to reach the finals. The shortened matches were played as curtain-raisers to the finals, rather than as a condensed tournament.
- 1996: the AFL staged a pre-season lightning premiership over a weekend in February 1996 to celebrate the league's Centenary Season. Matches were played over two halves of 17.5 minutes duration, and this was the first Lightning Premiership to trial some of the more experimental rules currently associated with the lightning format.
- 2011 to 2013: the AFL staged lightning matches in the first round of the annual pre-season competition. The league's eighteen teams competed in six separate rounds robin of three teams each, with each set of three matches played consecutively at one venue. In 2011, the lightning round was used to eliminate ten of the eighteen teams from the competition; in 2012, the lightning matches counted as two of each team's four scheduled pre-season competition matches.
- 2011: at the 2011 Australian Football International Cup, a round of lightning matches (in the form of six rounds robin of three teams each) was staged at the start of the tournament, and the results were used to separate the twelve stronger countries and the six weaker countries into separate divisions for the remainder of the tournament.

=== Lightning football at lower levels ===
Among the more notable senior lightning football events around Australia are:

- The Ngurratjuta Lightning Carnival, has been held every year since the 1980s over the Easter long weekend in Alice Springs. The Ngurratjuta Lightning Carnival attracts teams from all over the Northern Territory, including from remote indigenous communities, and is the biggest football event in the Red Centre.
- The Boag's Draught Pre-season Invitational, which is a pre-season lightning premiership played among the previous year's premiers from each of Greater Melbourne's eight metropolitan football leagues (the EFL, EDFL, GFL, NFL, RDFL, SFL, VAFA and WRFL). First staged in 2011.

Annual lightning carnivals have become common in many junior leagues and school competitions. This is not limited to Australian rules football, with many other sports contested under a lightning premiership format.

== Top level lightning premiership winners ==
This table lists winners of stand-alone lightning premiership series played in the major Australian state leagues.

Year	League	Winner
1896	VFA	Essendon
1940	SANFL	Sturt
1940	VFL	St Kilda
1941	SANFL	South Adelaide
1941	TANFL	Cananore (July)
1941	TANFL	North Hobart (September)
1941	VFL	Collingwood
1943	SANFL	West Adelaide/Glenelg; Combined World War II team
1943	VFL	Essendon
1946	SANFL	Sturt
1946	VFA	Williamstown
1947	SANFL	Sturt
1948	SANFL	Port Adelaide
1950	SANFL	Sturt
1951	NWFU	Ulverstone
1951	VFL	Collingwood
1952	VFL	Melbourne
1953	TANFL	New Norfolk
1953	VFL	Richmond
1971	Rothmans Cup	Hawthorn
1972	VFA	Coburg
1973	VFA	Geelong West
1974	VFA	Preston
1975	VFA	Prahran
1976	VFA	Coburg
1977	VFA	Caulfield
1978	VFA	Werribee
1979	VFA	Sandringham
1996	AFL	Essendon
