= 1952 Hawthorn Football Club season =

28th season in the Victorian Football League

Hawthorn Football Club
1952 season
- President: Dave Prentice
- Coach: Jack Hale
- Captain: Peter O'Donohue
- Home ground: Glenferrie Oval
- Lightning Premiership: 1st Round
- VFL Season: 5–14 (11th)
- Finals Series: Did not qualify
- Best and fairest: John Kennedy Sr.
- Leading goalkicker: Jack MacDonald (25)
- Highest home attendance: 15,000 (Round 4 vs. South Melbourne)
- Lowest home attendance: 6,000 (Round 19 vs. North Melbourne)
- Average home attendance: 11,056

The 1952 season was the Hawthorn Football Club's 28th season in the Victorian Football League and 51st overall.

== Fixture ==
=== Lightning Premiership ===
The lightning premiership was played between rounds 5 and 6.

Rd	Date and local time	Opponent	Scores (Hawthorn's scores indicated in bold)			Venue	Attendance
Rd	Date and local time	Opponent	Home	Away	Result	Venue	Attendance
1	Saturday, 24 May	Collingwood	4.3 (27)	**0.4 (4)**	Lost by 23 points	Melbourne Cricket Ground (A)	

=== Premiership Season ===
Rd	Date and local time	Opponent	Scores (Hawthorn's scores indicated in bold)			Venue	Attendance	Record
Rd	Date and local time	Opponent	Home	Away	Result	Venue	Attendance	Record
1	Saturday, 19 April (2:15 pm)	Collingwood	**2.8 (20)**	15.16 (106)	Lost by 86 points	Glenferrie Oval (H)	14,000	0–1
2	Saturday, 26 April (2:15 pm)	Richmond	12.10 (82)	**8.14 (62)**	Lost by 20 points	Punt Road Oval (A)	13,000	0–2
3	Saturday, 3 May (2:15 pm)	Melbourne	8.12 (60)	**10.14 (74)**	Won by 14 points	Melbourne Cricket Ground (A)	13,529	1–2
4	Saturday, 10 May (2:15 pm)	South Melbourne	**11.3 (69)**	8.12 (60)	Won by 9 points	Glenferrie Oval (H)	15,000	2–2
5	Saturday, 17 May (2:15 pm)	Fitzroy	6.6 (42)	**5.11 (41)**	Lost by 1 point	Brunswick Street Oval (A)	9,500	2–3
6	Saturday, 31 May (2:15 pm)	Essendon	**5.14 (44)**	15.8 (98)	Lost by 54 points	Glenferrie Oval (H)	14,000	2–4
7	Saturday, 7 June (2:15 pm)	North Melbourne	12.8 (80)	**7.8 (50)**	Lost by 30 points	Arden Street Oval (A)	11,000	2–5
8	Saturday, 14 June (2:15 pm)	Carlton	17.15 (117)	**11.14 (80)**	Lost by 37 points	Euroa Oval (A)	7,500	2–6
9	Saturday, 21 June (2:15 pm)	St Kilda	5.11 (41)	**7.6 (48)**	Won by 7 points	Junction Oval (A)	7,500	3–6
10	Saturday, 28 June (2:15 pm)	Geelong	**6.8 (44)**	10.10 (70)	Lost by 26 points	Glenferrie Oval (H)	7,500	3–7
11	Saturday, 5 July (2:15 pm)	Carlton	**5.11 (41)**	9.24 (78)	Lost by 37 points	Glenferrie Oval (H)	11,000	3–8
12	Saturday, 12 July (2:15 pm)	Footscray	4.11 (35)	**9.4 (58)**	Won by 23 points	Western Oval (A)	12,218	4–8
13	Saturday, 19 July (2:15 pm)	Collingwood	12.15 (87)	**4.4 (28)**	Lost by 59 points	Victoria Park (A)	12,643	4–9
14	Saturday, 26 July (2:15 pm)	Richmond	**8.14 (62)**	14.7 (91)	Lost by 29 points	Glenferrie Oval (H)	11,000	4–10
15	Saturday, 2 August (2:15 pm)	Melbourne	**9.3 (57)**	12.13 (85)	Lost by 28 points	Glenferrie Oval (H)	9,000	4–11
16	Saturday, 9 August (2:15 pm)	South Melbourne	6.14 (50)	**9.14 (68)**	Won by 18 points	Lake Oval (A)	12,000	5–11
17	Saturday, 16 August (2:15 pm)	Fitzroy	**7.6 (48)**	12.12 (84)	Lost by 36 points	Glenferrie Oval (H)	12,000	5–12
18	Saturday, 23 August (2:15 pm)	Essendon	20.12 (132)	**11.11 (77)**	Lost by 55 points	Windy Hill (A)	12,000	5–13
19	Saturday, 30 August (2:15 pm)	North Melbourne	**8.11 (59)**	12.10 (82)	Lost by 23 points	Glenferrie Oval (H)	6,000	5–14

== Ladder ==
(P)	Premiers
	Qualified for finals

#	Team	P	W	L	D	PF	PA	%	Pts
1	Geelong (P)	19	16	2	1	1594	1183	134.7	66
2	Collingwood	19	14	5	0	1528	1058	144.4	56
3	Fitzroy	19	13	6	0	1233	1170	105.4	52
4	Carlton	19	11	6	2	1473	1310	112.4	48
5	South Melbourne	19	11	7	1	1411	1337	105.5	46
6	Melbourne	19	9	9	1	1420	1379	103.0	38
7	North Melbourne	19	9	10	0	1352	1396	96.8	36
8	Essendon	19	8	10	1	1579	1390	113.6	34
9	Richmond	19	8	11	0	1281	1384	92.6	32
10	Footscray	19	5	14	0	1052	1364	77.1	20
11	Hawthorn	19	5	14	0	1030	1480	69.6	20
12	St Kilda	19	2	17	0	1071	1573	68.1	8

Rules for classification: 1. premiership points; 2. percentage; 3. points for
Average score: 70.3
Source: AFL Tables
