= 1971 WANFL season =

Australian football league season

- Teams: 8
- Premiers: West Perth; 14th premiership
- Minor premiers: East Perth; 13th minor premiership
- Sandover Medallist: David Hollins (East Fremantle)
- Leading goalkicker: Austin Robertson, Jr. (Subiaco)
- Matches played: 88

The 1971 WANFL season was the 87th season of the various incarnations of the Western Australian National Football League, and the forty-first (including three wartime under-age seasons) under that moniker.

Following half a decade dominated with the exception of two challenges from South Fremantle by the three Perth clubs and Austin Robertson's goalkicking, 1971 saw a changing of the guard, with Perth, in Mal Atwell's last season as coach, dropping to second from bottom owing to the weakness of their forward line, and Subiaco also fell out of the four after an off-season disrupted by efforts to thwart potential clearances of goal machine Robertson, half-forward George Young, and promising young players Stephen Heal and Peter Featherby.

After a promising season in 1970 and the acquisition of Colin Tully from Collingwood, John Evans from St. Kilda and 30-possession-per-game rover Ross Parker from VFA club Prahran, Claremont became early favourites for the flag. The Tigers faltered later on however, and despite playing finals for only the fourth time since 1942 and the first since 1965, were regarded as disappointing. East Perth, despite a noticeable roving weakness owing to the injury-related retirement of Keith Doncon, won fifteen of seventeen matches but failed in the Grand Final before rivals West Perth, who after a disappointing 1970 returned to second position and sent champion ruckman "Polly" Farmer out on a high note with his sixth senior premiership and second as their captain-coach. More significantly, East Fremantle, after four disastrous seasons, reached the preliminary final under the coaching of future Hawthorn premiership mentor Alan Joyce and nearly overcame the Cardinals in a heart-stopping preliminary.

Although the season did not quite reach the previous season's record average score of 100.76 points per team per game, it did see a record-high losing score and the highest score and greatest winning margin for over a decade.

== Home-and-away season ==
=== Round 1 (Easter weekend) ===
	Round 1
Saturday, 10 April (2:15 pm)	South Fremantle 26.20 (176)	def.	Subiaco 11.17 (83)	Fremantle Oval (crowd: 12430)
Saturday, 10 April (2:15 pm)	Claremont 17.20 (122)	def. by	East Fremantle 19.12 (126)	Claremont Oval (crowd: 10713)
Monday, 12 April (2:15 pm)	West Perth 12.13 (85)	def. by	Perth 14.9 (93)	Leederville Oval (crowd: 16444)
Monday, 12 April (2:15 pm)	Swan Districts 10.17 (77)	def. by	East Perth 19.18 (132)	Bassendean Oval (crowd: 11230)
1970 premiers South Fremantle suggest by their devastating ball movement to ten-goal full forward Graham Scott during a second half where they score 17.11 (113) to 3.5 (23) that they will be even more formidable in 1971.; Perth obtain a short-lived dividend from using rover Graham Jenzen in the troubling full-forward position, where he scores eight goals including six in the first half, which combines with the Demons' efficient defence to defeat the Cardinals.

=== Round 2 ===
	Round 2
Saturday, 17 April (2:15 pm)	Subiaco 8.7 (55)	def. by	West Perth 15.16 (106)	Subiaco Oval (crowd: 8857)
Saturday, 17 April (2:15 pm)	Perth 14.20 (104)	drew with	Swan Districts 15.14 (104)	Lathlain Park (crowd: 7662)
Saturday, 17 April (2:15 pm)	East Perth 11.10 (76)	def. by	Claremont 13.13 (91)	Perth Oval (crowd: 11732)
Saturday, 17 April (2:15 pm)	East Fremantle 17.13 (115)	def. by	South Fremantle 18.15 (123)	East Fremantle Oval (crowd: 14956)
1968 and 1970 wooden spooners Swan Districts outplay Perth until major positional changes by Mal Atwell – notably moving Cable to the centre where he had played most of his junior football – drives a Demons comeback for a thrilling draw.; South Fremantle run off a four-goal deficit halfway through the final quarter "in the time it takes to run a fast mile"; then – led by Don Haddow – hang on to win a thrilling local derby.

=== Round 3 ===
	Round 3
Saturday, 24 April (2:15 pm)	South Fremantle 12.12 (84)	def. by	Perth 15.12 (102)	Fremantle Oval (crowd: 13401)
Saturday, 24 April (2:15 pm)	East Perth 19.17 (131)	def.	Subiaco 12.9 (81)	Perth Oval (crowd: 8688)
Saturday, 24 April (2:15 pm)	Claremont 8.17 (65)	def. by	West Perth 9.4 (58)	Claremont Oval (crowd: 12023)
Saturday, 24 April (2:15 pm)	Swan Districts 15.21 (111)	def.	East Fremantle 11.9 (75)	Bassendean Oval (crowd: 8804)
Claremont's inaccuracy, despite completely controlling the play, casts doubt over their much-touted premiership chances. Blind punts by skilful captain-coach Dennis Marshall were especially common and ineffective.; A number of experimental moves by Royals captain-coach Brown fail before he reverses them and the winless Lions are crushed in the second half.; Despite the retirement of Pat Dalton, and Cable aiming for the Claremont coaching job, Perth reverse the 1970 Grand Final against a weakened Bulldog team who play several unfit key men.

=== Round 4 ===
	Round 4
Saturday, 1 May (2:15 pm)	West Perth 16.16 (112)	def.	South Fremantle 12.10 (82)	Leederville Oval (crowd: 13117)
Saturday, 1 May (2:15 pm)	Perth 17.14 (116)	def.	East Perth 11.14 (80)	Lathlain Park (crowd: 12031)
Saturday, 1 May (2:15 pm)	Swan Districts 6.12 (48)	def. by	Claremont 19.13 (127)	Bassendean Oval (crowd: 9989)
Saturday, 1 May (2:15 pm)	East Fremantle 12.12 (84)	def. by	Subiaco 15.19 (109)	East Fremantle Oval (crowd: 6677)
Barry Cable is best afield at centre, whilst rovers Brian Cousins and Greg Bennett are too good for East Perth, whose attack cannot match Perth's close-checking defence.; In "Polly" Farmer's Australian-record three hundred and thirty ninth senior match, West Perth's superior teamwork exposes South Fremantle except during the third quarter. Farmer and Whinnen expose South's weakness in the centre position and give Phil Smith great service – to which he responds by kicking 9.4 (58).

=== Round 5 ===
	Round 5
Saturday, 8 May (2:15 pm)	Swan Districts 7.7 (49)	def. by	West Perth 14.15 (99)	Bassendean Oval (crowd: 9000)
Saturday, 8 May (2:15 pm)	Subiaco 16.13 (109)	def.	Perth 11.6 (72)	Subiaco Oval (crowd: 8332)
Saturday, 8 May (2:15 pm)	Claremont 20.13 (133)	def.	South Fremantle 14.11 (95)	Claremont Oval (crowd: 12863)
Saturday, 8 May (2:15 pm)	East Fremantle 23.16 (154)	def.	East Perth 18.17 (125)	East Fremantle Oval (crowd: 8071)
Claremont, after the Bulldogs kicked 7.2 (44) to 0.2 (2) with the wind in the first half of the third quarter, then score 13.3 (81) to nothing until the last minute as the Tigers take complete ruck control from Fred Seinor and rover Roley Daw – with the result that the Bulldog defence is completely overrun.; Perth's lack of a spearhead to compete with Austin Robertson's nine goals, along with a rejuvenated Maroon half-forward line, ends the Demons' undefeated opening as well as Subiaco's extremely worrying start after three successive finals berths.

=== Round 6 ===
	Round 6
Saturday, 15 May (2:15 pm)	South Fremantle 17.21 (123)	def.	Swan Districts 15.12 (102)	Fremantle Oval (crowd: 7183)
Saturday, 15 May (2:15 pm)	West Perth 9.10 (64)	def. by	East Perth 19.14 (128)	Leederville Oval (crowd: 12420)
Saturday, 15 May (2:15 pm)	Claremont 22.20 (152)	def.	Subiaco 17.8 (110)	Claremont Oval (crowd: 10923)
Saturday, 15 May (2:15 pm)	Perth 14.12 (96)	def. by	East Fremantle 19.11 (125)	Lathlain Park (crowd: 8557)
Mal Brown's move of himself into the ruck and Ken McAullay to a half-back flank leads West Perth into error after error and overcomes a worrying beginning to 1971 by the Royals.; Much-hyped former Central District full-forward Ric Vidovich kicks twelve goals as East Fremantle inflict a second defeat upon the highly regarded Perth defence, who fail to stop his fast leading.

=== Round 7 ===
	Round 7
Saturday, 22 May (2:15 pm)	Subiaco 9.13 (67)	def. by	Swan Districts 13.14 (92)	Subiaco Oval (crowd: 3729)
Saturday, 22 May (2:15 pm)	East Perth 11.11 (77)	def.	South Fremantle 10.11 (71)	Perth Oval (crowd: 7209)
Saturday, 22 May (2:15 pm)	Claremont 8.15 (63)	def. by	Perth 9.10 (64)	Claremont Oval (crowd: 6924)
Saturday, 22 May (2:15 pm)	East Fremantle 9.5 (59)	def.	West Perth 6.11 (47)	East Fremantle Oval (crowd: 6657)
West Perth score only 2.3 (15) to three-quarter time in wind and rain – their lowest three-quarter time score for 51 years – before a charge with the wind is thwarted by inaccuracy.; East Perth score a crucial victory over a gallant South Fremantle weakened by the loss of captain-coach Mann (ill in bed) whose inaccuracy prevents the exploitation of a weak Royal defence in the muddy conditions.; The attempt by Claremont to turn ruckman John Spry into a makeshift full-forward fails completely, so that the Tigers lose a thrilling battle between the top two and Demon full-back John Quartermaine – thrashed in the two previous rounds – exploits his severe ground-level weakness in very wet weather.

=== Round 8 ===
	Round 8
Saturday, 29 May (2:15 pm)	Subiaco 26.9 (165)	def.	South Fremantle 20.21 (141)	Subiaco Oval (crowd: 9562)
Saturday, 29 May (2:15 pm)	Perth 21.4 (130)	def. by	West Perth 21.12 (138)	Lathlain Park (crowd: 11037)
Saturday, 29 May (2:15 pm)	East Perth 23.16 (154)	def.	Swan Districts 7.14 (56)	Perth Oval (crowd: 9457)
Saturday, 29 May (2:15 pm)	East Fremantle 16.10 (106)	def. by	Claremont 27.13 (175)	East Fremantle Oval (crowd: 13569)
Barry Cable kicks a career-high nine goals but Perth still fail against the eventual premiers despite remarkable accuracy.; Claremont's score remains their highest at East Fremantle Oval and was the highest by a visiting team there until 1980, as a long drop-kick goal on the quarter-time siren by Tully is followed by a brilliant second quarter of 11.3 (69) to 1.3 (9) from which Old Easts cannot recover.; South Fremantle kick the highest losing score in the WANFL to that point, beating their own record of 21.13 (139) from the previous season but falling three points shy of that record aggregate score.; Subiaco, after a sluggish start, rebound with the return to the field of coach Bunton junior, Cam Blakemore and Col Williams, in the process holding off a South Fremantle comeback that saw them nearly take the lead in the last quarter.

=== Round 9 (Foundation Day) ===
	Round 9
Saturday, 5 June (2:15 pm)	West Perth 16.17 (113)	def.	Subiaco 12.9 (81)	Leederville Oval (crowd: 12295)
Saturday, 5 June (2:15 pm)	Swan Districts 7.11 (53)	def. by	Perth 11.16 (82)	Bassendean Oval (crowd: 6085)
Monday, 7 June (2:15 pm)	Claremont 11.14 (80)	def. by	East Perth 11.17 (83)	Claremont Oval (crowd: 15882)
Monday, 7 June (2:15 pm)	South Fremantle 12.19 (91)	def. by	East Fremantle 24.10 (154)	Fremantle Oval (crowd: 11890)
East Perth snatch a win after an all-day thriller with seventeen seconds remaining in front of a record Claremont Oval crowd, following what critics regarded as the finest match of the season.

=== Round 10 ===
	Round 10
Saturday, 12 June (2:15 pm)	Perth 13.9 (87)	def. by	South Fremantle 13.15 (93)	Lathlain Park (crowd: 9268)
Saturday, 12 June (2:15 pm)	Subiaco 17.14 (116)	def. by	East Perth 19.15 (129)	Subiaco Oval (crowd: 9888)
Saturday, 12 June (2:15 pm)	West Perth 15.9 (99)	def.	Claremont 13.13 (91)	Leederville Oval (crowd: 14576)
Saturday, 12 June (2:15 pm)	East Fremantle 19.19 (133)	def.	Swan Districts 9.16 (70)	East Fremantle Oval (crowd: 7179)
A depleted East Perth team almost end Subiaco's finals chances as the Maroons finish poorly after bridging 27 points of a 38-point half-time deficit during the third quarter.; East Fremantle's accurate kicking and the lack of stamina from Swan Districts – with Bill Walker clearly unfit – sees Old Easts come from thirty-two points behind at quarter time to score 13.12 (90) to 0.7 (7) in the second half.

=== Round 11 ===
	Round 11
Saturday, 19 June (2:15 pm)	South Fremantle 11.9 (75)	def. by	West Perth 11.17 (83)	Fremantle Oval (crowd: 11340)
Saturday, 19 June (2:15 pm)	East Perth 20.11 (131)	def.	Perth 16.11 (107)	Perth Oval (crowd: 13846)
Saturday, 19 June (2:15 pm)	Claremont 18.12 (120)	def.	Swan Districts 14.11 (95)	Claremont Oval (crowd: 7170)
Saturday, 19 June (2:15 pm)	Subiaco 21.8 (134)	def.	East Fremantle 13.9 (87)	Subiaco Oval (crowd: 7952)
Subiaco, after many selection controversies – notably dropping George Young and Keith Watt to the reserves – produce their best performance of 1971 with three quarters of masterful teamwork.

=== Round 12 ===
	Round 12
Saturday, 26 June (2:15 pm)	West Perth 31.18 (204)	def.	Swan Districts 6.10 (46)	Leederville Oval (crowd: 7092)
Saturday, 26 June (2:15 pm)	Perth 14.15 (99)	def.	Subiaco 12.9 (81)	Lathlain Park (crowd: 9140)
Saturday, 26 June (2:15 pm)	South Fremantle 20.13 (133)	def.	Claremont 18.17 (125)	Fremantle Oval (crowd: 9877)
Saturday, 26 June (2:15 pm)	East Perth 20.13 (133)	def.	East Fremantle 14.10 (94)	Perth Oval (crowd: 10288)
With Phil Smith kicking ten goals, West Perth kick the first double-century score in the WANFL since East Perth score 32.19 (211) against Claremont in 1958.; Cardinal wingman Alan Watling has an astonishing forty-five kicks and nineteen marks as Swans offer no resistance save for that from John O‘Neill and ex-Saint Ian Cooper.; Perth's tight defence places them back in the four and virtually eliminates Subiaco as a contender. Austin Robertson scores only two goals against strong full-back Quartermaine, whilst Perth's 7.4 (46) in the third quarter of a low-scoring match proves decisive.; In veteran Tom Grljusich's last match before a seven-week overseas business journey, South Fremantle's wing dominance through Peter Troode and Alan Rose gives them an upset win over a Claremont team plagued by weakness in key positions.

=== Round 13 ===
	Round 13
Saturday, 3 July (2:15 pm)	Swan Districts 16.16 (112)	def.	South Fremantle 12.9 (81)	Bassendean Oval (crowd: 4116)
Saturday, 3 July (2:15 pm)	East Perth 27.16 (178)	def.	West Perth 12.8 (80)	Perth Oval (crowd: 10783)
Saturday, 3 July (2:15 pm)	Subiaco 17.14 (116)	def.	Claremont 9.15 (69)	Subiaco Oval (crowd: 6606)
Saturday, 3 July (2:15 pm)	East Fremantle 14.15 (99)	def.	Perth 14.13 (97)	East Fremantle Oval (crowd: 6727)
The 98-point winning margin remains East Perth's biggest over their bitter rivals, as the depleted Royals make an overdue premiership look a formality against a slow and undersized Cardinal defence where eighteen-year-old full-back Wayne Blockland is "thrown to the wolves".; East Fremantle achieved the best of a number of notable comebacks when they came from 33 points down at three-quarter time to defeat Perth, whose attack is undermanned by Mal Atwell's decision to play their forwards as defensive loose men and cannot capitalise upon impressive determination and power in the centre.

=== Round 14 ===
	Round 14
Saturday, 10 July (2:15 pm)	Swan Districts 16.6 (102)	def. by	Subiaco 18.22 (130)	Bassendean Oval (crowd: 6783)
Saturday, 10 July (2:15 pm)	South Fremantle 16.8 (104)	def. by	East Perth 18.12 (120)	Fremantle Oval (crowd: 10224)
Saturday, 10 July (2:15 pm)	Perth 15.9 (99)	def.	Claremont 13.14 (92)	Lathlain Park (crowd: 10816)
Saturday, 10 July (2:15 pm)	West Perth 9.10 (64)	def. by	East Fremantle 13.14 (92)	Leederville Oval (crowd: 10774)
The move of Bill Walker to centre and Peter Manning to rover misfires, as Cam Blakemore and Keith Watt prove the difference for the Maroons against dogged opposition in "Ocker" Robertson's two hundredth match – he kicked 5.2 (32) but had to work for all of that.; Barry Cable's amazing workrate and inspiring on-field leadership inflicts Claremont's sixth defeat in eight matches and puts the Demons back in the four – leaving critics thinking Claremont unlikely to get back.; East Fremantle score 6.12 (48) to 3.2 (20) after half-time to demoralise West Perth, who could have wrapped up the game in the first half – as it was the Cardinals' lack of application left their finals berth in jeopardy.

=== Round 15 ===
	Round 15
Saturday, 24 July (2:15 pm)	South Fremantle 15.13 (103)	def.	Subiaco 11.14 (80)	Fremantle Oval (crowd: 4443)
Saturday, 24 July (2:15 pm)	West Perth 10.13 (73)	def.	Perth 9.13 (67)	Leederville Oval (crowd: 5849)
Saturday, 24 July (2:15 pm)	Swan Districts 13.8 (86)	def.	East Perth 11.16 (82)	Bassendean Oval (crowd: 3879)
Saturday, 24 July (2:15 pm)	Claremont 16.11 (107)	def.	East Fremantle 7.14 (56)	Claremont Oval (crowd: 6031)
Swan Districts end East Perth's run of nine victories as their tight defence and centreman Manning combine with fanatical desire in the wet.; East Fremantle's ill-advised short play in wet conditions and Dennins Marshall's fanatical pre-match address drives the Tigers to a big victory. 0.0 (0) to 3.1 (19) in arrears after five minutes the Tigers score fifteen goals to four for the remainder of the match.; In a match where neither side showed a high standard in the rain, Perth's ruck weakness showed them out of premiership contention, as VFL veterans Peter Steward and "Polly" Farmer prove the matchwinners for the Cardinals.

=== Round 16 ===
	Round 16
Saturday, 31 July (2:15 pm)	Subiaco 13.14 (92)	def.	West Perth 8.10 (58)	Subiaco Oval (crowd: 7616)
Saturday, 31 July (2:15 pm)	Perth 16.11 (107)	def.	Swan Districts 14.13 (97)	Lathlain Park (crowd: 6369)
Saturday, 31 July (2:15 pm)	East Perth 11.13 (79)	def.	Claremont 10.7 (67)	Perth Oval (crowd: 12126)
Saturday, 31 July (2:15 pm)	East Fremantle 7.14 (56)	def. by	South Fremantle 18.12 (120)	East Fremantle Oval (crowd: 9407)
Three brilliant long goals, and a verve reminiscent of their 1970 premiership run, see South Fremantle only a game from fourth position as East Fremantle's follies of dropping full-forward Vidovich and attempting to use half-forward Fred Lewis at full-back backfires. Old Easts score only one goal in each of three quarters and are left insecure with a very poor percentage.; East Perth produce another impressive win with seventeen fit players after full-forward Phil Tierney was concussed, as Ron Alexander in the spearhead role and a fanatical defence prove too good for the rejuvenated Tigers.

=== Round 17 ===
	Round 17
Saturday, 7 August (2:15 pm)	South Fremantle 11.10 (76)	def.	Perth 7.13 (55)	Fremantle Oval (crowd: 10075)
Saturday, 7 August (2:15 pm)	East Perth 14.11 (95)	def.	Subiaco 7.13 (55)	Perth Oval (crowd: 10148)
Saturday, 7 August (2:15 pm)	Claremont 7.5 (47)	def. by	West Perth 16.12 (108)	Claremont Oval (crowd: 10394)
Saturday, 7 August (2:15 pm)	Swan Districts 9.9 (63)	def. by	East Fremantle 13.15 (93)	Bassendean Oval (crowd: 5250)
West Perth's tight defence and some surprising team changes ensure they crush Claremont in showery conditions. The recalled Norm Knell and newcomers Peter Curley, Graeme Hadley and Tony Dragan completely revitalise the Cardinals.; South Fremantle maintain hope of defending their 1970 pennant with an irresistible final quarter burst produced by countering Perth's roving strength through Rowley Daw and Brian Ciccosto.

=== Round 18 ===
	Round 18
Saturday, 14 August (2:15 pm)	West Perth 14.15 (99)	def.	South Fremantle 10.8 (68)	Leederville Oval (crowd: 9096)
Saturday, 14 August (2:15 pm)	East Perth 7.15 (57)	def.	Perth 6.9 (45)	Perth Oval (crowd: 7080)
Saturday, 14 August (2:15 pm)	Swan Districts 10.9 (69)	def. by	Claremont 14.7 (91)	Bassendean Oval (crowd: 3480)
Saturday, 14 August (2:15 pm)	East Fremantle 12.18 (90)	def.	Subiaco 8.21 (69)	East Fremantle Oval (crowd: 4511)
East Perth skipper Mal Brown's control and ability to move from position to position, plus their more direct approach in very wet weather, ensures a much more comfortable win over the Demons than the scoreboard implies.; "Polly" Farmer's 350th senior match sees the veteran champion dominate against younger and taller rivals to jeopardise South Fremantle's hopes of defending its premiership – the Bulldogs lose several key players as well as the match.; The switch of David Hollins to the centre helps move East Fremantle to third and leave an inaccurate Subiaco out of finals contention, as the Maroons' inaccurate attack constantly breaks down.

=== Round 19 ===
	Round 19
Saturday, 21 August (2:15 pm)	Swan Districts 12.11 (83)	def. by	West Perth 20.16 (136)	Bassendean Oval (crowd: 6051)
Saturday, 21 August (2:15 pm)	Perth 10.12 (72)	def. by	Subiaco 14.10 (94)	Lathlain Park (crowd: 6833)
Saturday, 21 August (2:15 pm)	Claremont 25.15 (165)	def.	South Fremantle 17.8 (110)	Claremont Oval (crowd: 10600)
Saturday, 21 August (2:15 pm)	East Fremantle 15.19 (109)	def.	East Perth 12.13 (85)	East Fremantle Oval (crowd: 8924)
East Fremantle's fleet of small players inflicts only East Perth's second loss since the fifth round, and effectively seals their finals berth besides giving them an opportunity to take the double chance from West Perth should the latter lose two tough games.; After a very sluggish beginning, Claremont, led by centre half-forward Lindsay Carroll, produce a precision display of attacking football to end the Bulldogs' hopes of a premiership defence. The Tigers' precise and direct kicking produces 23.11 (149) to 10.4 (64) after quarter-time.

=== Round 20 ===
	Round 20
Saturday, 28 August (2:15 pm)	South Fremantle 27.14 (176)	def.	Swan Districts 19.16 (130)	Fremantle Oval (crowd: 4201)
Saturday, 28 August (2:15 pm)	West Perth 12.13 (85)	def. by	East Perth 15.10 (100)	Leederville Oval (crowd: 16478)
Saturday, 28 August (2:15 pm)	Subiaco 14.14 (98)	def.	Claremont 8.11 (59)	Subiaco Oval (crowd: 8854)
Saturday, 28 August (2:15 pm)	Perth 13.11 (89)	def. by	East Fremantle 13.16 (94)	Lathlain Park (crowd: 7778)
25 points behind at half-time, South Fremantle, adopting so-called "Hawthorn tactics" which virtually eliminated the half-backs and half-forwards, kicked 20.9 (129) to 9.5 (59) in the second half of which full-forward Scott kicks ten. It was then the second most points in a second half of a WANFL match, and remains the highest against Swan Districts.; Perth's poor forward play again prevents them capitalising on their midfield dominance resulting from Trevor Parsons' ruck dominance, effectively sealing the four (Note: Had Perth won, the last-round match at Claremont Oval would have determined fourth position.) and leaving East Fremantle to battle with West Perth for second position.

=== Round 21 ===
	Round 21
Saturday, 4 September (2:15 pm)	Subiaco 16.13 (109)	def.	Swan Districts 15.13 (103)	Subiaco Oval (crowd: 4260)
Saturday, 4 September (2:15 pm)	East Perth 20.13 (133)	def.	South Fremantle 8.9 (57)	Perth Oval (crowd: 8117)
Saturday, 4 September (2:15 pm)	Claremont 13.18 (96)	def.	Perth 6.7 (43)	Claremont Oval (crowd: 6566)
Saturday, 4 September (2:15 pm)	East Fremantle 9.11 (65)	def. by	West Perth 16.14 (110)	East Fremantle Oval (crowd: 12229)
Perth, shorn of all initiative and with full-back John Quartermaine completely out of place at full-forward, score only 1.3 (9) in the second half in good conditions.; A crushing first half with 11.8 (74) to 1.5 (11) ensures West Perth clinch the double chance, as Farmer signals his farewell with his best performance of the season, featuring sixteen kicks, ten marks, and sixteen effective handballs. East Fremantle came back to within four goals early in the last quarter before the Cardinals kicked away again with the strong wind.; Austin Robertson's eleven goals almost single-handedly wins over a spirited Swan Districts team and gives "Ocker" a record seventh season as WANFL leading goalkicker. (Note: George Doig (in 1934 to 1937, 1940 and 1941) and Bernie Naylor (in 1946 to 1948 and 1952 to 1954) previously held the record with six.)

== Ladder ==
1971 WANFL ladder
Pos	Team	Pld	W	L	D	PF	PA	PP	Pts
1	East Perth	21	16	5	0	2308	1795	128.6	64
2	West Perth (P)	21	13	8	0	2021	1746	115.8	52
3	East Fremantle	21	12	9	0	2066	2140	96.5	48
4	Claremont	21	11	10	0	2137	1871	114.2	44
5	Subiaco	21	10	11	0	2034	2133	95.4	40
6	South Fremantle	21	9	12	0	2182	2288	95.4	36
7	Perth	21	8	12	1	1826	1924	94.9	34
8	Swan Districts	21	4	16	1	1748	2425	72.1	18

Rules for classification: 1) points; 2) percentage; 3) number of points for.
(P) Premiers

== Finals ==
=== First semi-final ===
	First semi-final
Saturday, 11 September (2:15 pm)	East Fremantle 18.21 (129)	def.	Claremont 11.16 (82)	Subiaco Oval (crowd: 27,813)
With regular full-back Neil Dedman kicking seven goals at full-forward, East Fremantle overrun favourites Claremont in the second half, as the Tigers' expected ruck and key forward superiority is never observed.

=== Second semi-final ===
	Second semi-final
Saturday, 18 September (2:15 pm)	East Perth 9.8 (62)	def.	West Perth 7.10 (52)	Subiaco Oval (crowd: 25,667)
With winds gusting to 60 miles per hour (97 km/h) and heavy, squalling rain, the move of Eddie Pitter onto the field and of Bygraves to full-forward drives East Perth to a fourth victory over the Cardinals for 1971, after West Perth looked safe at half-time.

=== Preliminary final ===
	Preliminary final
Saturday, 25 September (2:15 pm)	West Perth 12.7 (79)	def.	East Fremantle 11.10 (76)	Subiaco Oval (crowd: 23,447)
With Phil Smith kicking eight goals on a ground drenched by Perth's wettest September since 1923 the Cardinals hang on to deny East Fremantle a fairytale.; Despite West Perth suffering from panic in the last quarter, they hang on when Gary Fenner misses everything from 40 yards (37 m) out and straight in front with under a minute remaining.

=== Grand Final ===
1971 WANFL Grand Final
Saturday, 2 October	East Perth	def. by	West Perth	Subiaco Oval (crowd: 50,975)
2.1 (13); 3.5 (23); 5.10 (40); 9.15 (69)	Q1; Q2; Q3; Final	6.6 (42); 9.10 (64); 11.14 (80); 14.17 (101)	Umpires: Lindsay Johnston; Simpson Medal: Shane Sheridan (West Perth)
Tierney 5, Verstegen, McPherson, Michalczyk, Bygraves	Goals	Smeath 4, Smith 2, Arnott 2, Dyson 2, Miller 2, Farmer, Sheridan
McAullay, Chadwick, Tierney, Burns, Gillespie, Brown, Hayes	Best	Sheridan, Farmer, Steward, McAuliffe, Dempsey, Watling, O‘Dwyer, Whinnen, Miller
Mihalczyk (foot)	Injuries	Miller (bruised shoulder); Arnott (cramp)
In champion ruckman "Polly" Farmer's farewell after 356 senior matches, West Perth's runners dominate over the favoured Royals, who suffer their seventh consecutive loss in grand finals, leading to severe questioning of the Royals' mental toughness.
