= 1940 VFL season =

44th season of the Victorian Football League (VFL)

1940 VFL premiership season
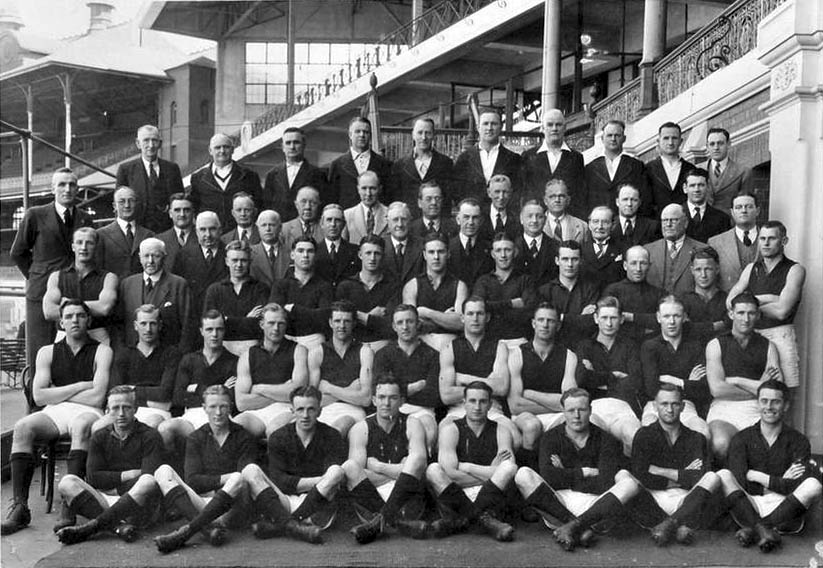
- Melbourne Football Club, premiers
- Teams: 12
- Premiers: Melbourne; 4th premiership
- Minor premiers: Melbourne; 2nd minor premiership
- Brownlow Medallist: Des Fothergill (Collingwood); Herbie Matthews (South Melbourne)
- Jack Titus (Richmond)
- Matches played: 112
- Highest: 70,330

The 1940 VFL season was the 44th season of the Victorian Football League (VFL), the highest level senior Australian rules football competition in Victoria. The season featured twelve clubs, ran from 27 April until 28 September, and comprised an 18-game home-and-away season followed by a finals series featuring the top four clubs.

The premiership was won by the Melbourne Football Club for the fourth time and second time consecutively, after it defeated Richmond by 39 points in the 1940 VFL Grand Final.

== Background ==
In 1940, the VFL competition consisted of twelve teams of 18 on-the-field players each, plus one substitute player, known as the 19th man. A player could be substituted for any reason; however, once substituted, a player could not return to the field of play under any circumstances.

Teams played each other in a home-and-away season of 18 rounds; matches 12 to 18 were the "home-and-way reverse" of matches 1 to 7.

Once the 18 round home-and-away season had finished, the 1940 VFL Premiers were determined by the specific format and conventions of the Page–McIntyre system.

== Home-and-away season ==
=== Round 1 ===
| Home team | Home team score | Away team | Away team score | Venue | Crowd | Date |
|---|---|---|---|---|---|---|
| Hawthorn | 25.11 (161) | North Melbourne | 13.11 (89) | Glenferrie Oval | 14,000 | 27 April 1940 |
| Fitzroy | 13.13 (91) | St Kilda | 10.20 (80) | Brunswick Street Oval | 20,000 | 27 April 1940 |
| Essendon | 18.17 (125) | Melbourne | 16.12 (108) | Windy Hill | 23,000 | 27 April 1940 |
| Richmond | 14.19 (103) | Footscray | 17.13 (115) | Punt Road Oval | 24,000 | 27 April 1940 |
| South Melbourne | 11.14 (80) | Collingwood | 13.14 (92) | Lake Oval | 18,000 | 27 April 1940 |
| Geelong | 9.18 (72) | Carlton | 12.27 (99) | Corio Oval | 12,000 | 27 April 1940 |

=== Round 2 ===
| Home team | Home team score | Away team | Away team score | Venue | Crowd | Date |
|---|---|---|---|---|---|---|
| Melbourne | 18.14 (122) | Richmond | 14.15 (99) | MCG | 20,044 | 4 May 1940 |
| Collingwood | 11.13 (79) | Geelong | 14.10 (94) | Victoria Park | 11,000 | 4 May 1940 |
| Carlton | 15.19 (109) | South Melbourne | 12.5 (77) | Princes Park | 19,000 | 4 May 1940 |
| St Kilda | 12.25 (97) | Hawthorn | 7.13 (55) | Junction Oval | 17,000 | 4 May 1940 |
| North Melbourne | 15.16 (106) | Fitzroy | 7.9 (51) | Arden Street Oval | 11,000 | 4 May 1940 |
| Footscray | 17.9 (111) | Essendon | 9.12 (66) | Western Oval | 25,000 | 4 May 1940 |

=== Round 3 ===
| Home team | Home team score | Away team | Away team score | Venue | Crowd | Date |
|---|---|---|---|---|---|---|
| Hawthorn | 15.12 (102) | Richmond | 19.15 (129) | Glenferrie Oval | 16,000 | 11 May 1940 |
| Essendon | 12.14 (86) | South Melbourne | 10.15 (75) | Windy Hill | 16,000 | 11 May 1940 |
| St Kilda | 12.12 (84) | North Melbourne | 9.11 (65) | Junction Oval | 15,500 | 11 May 1940 |
| Melbourne | 20.21 (141) | Footscray | 15.12 (102) | MCG | 30,867 | 11 May 1940 |
| Geelong | 16.19 (115) | Fitzroy | 13.8 (86) | Corio Oval | 8,500 | 11 May 1940 |
| Collingwood | 18.19 (127) | Carlton | 12.18 (90) | Victoria Park | 23,000 | 11 May 1940 |

=== Round 4 ===
| Home team | Home team score | Away team | Away team score | Venue | Crowd | Date |
|---|---|---|---|---|---|---|
| Footscray | 9.16 (70) | St Kilda | 13.14 (92) | Western Oval | 16,000 | 18 May 1940 |
| Carlton | 13.12 (90) | Melbourne | 16.20 (116) | Princes Park | 18,000 | 18 May 1940 |
| South Melbourne | 22.13 (145) | Hawthorn | 16.10 (106) | Lake Oval | 9,000 | 18 May 1940 |
| Richmond | 17.15 (117) | Geelong | 11.6 (72) | Punt Road Oval | 13,000 | 18 May 1940 |
| Fitzroy | 12.15 (87) | Essendon | 10.16 (76) | Brunswick Street Oval | 13,000 | 18 May 1940 |
| North Melbourne | 14.15 (99) | Collingwood | 10.15 (75) | Arden Street Oval | 11,000 | 18 May 1940 |

=== Round 5 ===
| Home team | Home team score | Away team | Away team score | Venue | Crowd | Date |
|---|---|---|---|---|---|---|
| Geelong | 12.21 (93) | South Melbourne | 10.12 (72) | Corio Oval | 5,000 | 25 May 1940 |
| Fitzroy | 8.14 (62) | Richmond | 12.11 (83) | Brunswick Street Oval | 14,000 | 25 May 1940 |
| Essendon | 12.18 (90) | Hawthorn | 9.19 (73) | Windy Hill | 12,000 | 25 May 1940 |
| North Melbourne | 7.11 (53) | Footscray | 9.12 (66) | Arden Street Oval | 13,000 | 25 May 1940 |
| Melbourne | 17.12 (114) | Collingwood | 13.20 (98) | MCG | 20,043 | 25 May 1940 |
| St Kilda | 6.18 (54) | Carlton | 11.19 (85) | Junction Oval | 21,000 | 25 May 1940 |

=== Round 6 ===
| Home team | Home team score | Away team | Away team score | Venue | Crowd | Date |
|---|---|---|---|---|---|---|
| Richmond | 17.10 (112) | St Kilda | 11.10 (76) | Punt Road Oval | 20,000 | 1 June 1940 |
| Hawthorn | 12.15 (87) | Melbourne | 11.15 (81) | Glenferrie Oval | 8,000 | 1 June 1940 |
| Footscray | 10.6 (66) | Geelong | 10.14 (74) | Western Oval | 12,000 | 1 June 1940 |
| Collingwood | 12.13 (85) | Essendon | 11.17 (83) | Victoria Park | 11,000 | 1 June 1940 |
| Carlton | 10.16 (76) | Fitzroy | 8.14 (62) | Princes Park | 16,000 | 1 June 1940 |
| South Melbourne | 16.9 (105) | North Melbourne | 16.8 (104) | Lake Oval | 9,000 | 1 June 1940 |

=== Round 7 ===
| Home team | Home team score | Away team | Away team score | Venue | Crowd | Date |
|---|---|---|---|---|---|---|
| Richmond | 13.16 (94) | South Melbourne | 12.13 (85) | Punt Road Oval | 10,000 | 8 June 1940 |
| Fitzroy | 17.11 (113) | Hawthorn | 12.14 (86) | Brunswick Street Oval | 7,000 | 8 June 1940 |
| North Melbourne | 8.1 (49) | Melbourne | 12.34 (106) | Arden Street Oval | 5,000 | 8 June 1940 |
| Geelong | 9.13 (67) | Essendon | 10.22 (82) | Corio Oval | 5,000 | 8 June 1940 |
| St Kilda | 10.12 (72) | Collingwood | 13.14 (92) | Junction Oval | 13,000 | 8 June 1940 |
| Footscray | 12.18 (90) | Carlton | 12.8 (80) | Western Oval | 13,000 | 8 June 1940 |

=== Round 8 ===
| Home team | Home team score | Away team | Away team score | Venue | Crowd | Date |
|---|---|---|---|---|---|---|
| Collingwood | 6.13 (49) | Richmond | 10.15 (75) | Victoria Park | 20,000 | 15 June 1940 |
| South Melbourne | 12.9 (81) | St Kilda | 10.16 (76) | Lake Oval | 12,000 | 15 June 1940 |
| North Melbourne | 8.15 (63) | Geelong | 13.20 (98) | Arden Street Oval | 5,000 | 15 June 1940 |
| Hawthorn | 8.17 (65) | Footscray | 15.20 (110) | Glenferrie Oval | 10,000 | 15 June 1940 |
| Essendon | 12.14 (86) | Carlton | 8.15 (63) | Windy Hill | 16,000 | 15 June 1940 |
| Melbourne | 12.15 (87) | Fitzroy | 12.13 (85) | MCG | 19,737 | 17 June 1940 |

=== Round 9 ===
| Home team | Home team score | Away team | Away team score | Venue | Crowd | Date |
|---|---|---|---|---|---|---|
| Geelong | 12.18 (90) | Hawthorn | 6.10 (46) | Corio Oval | 4,000 | 22 June 1940 |
| Fitzroy | 10.30 (90) | South Melbourne | 10.17 (77) | Brunswick Street Oval | 12,000 | 22 June 1940 |
| Carlton | 16.20 (116) | North Melbourne | 18.12 (120) | Princes Park | 13,000 | 22 June 1940 |
| St Kilda | 16.16 (112) | Melbourne | 17.21 (123) | Junction Oval | 13,000 | 22 June 1940 |
| Richmond | 12.5 (77) | Essendon | 12.10 (82) | Punt Road Oval | 19,000 | 22 June 1940 |
| Footscray | 15.10 (100) | Collingwood | 12.12 (84) | Western Oval | 15,000 | 22 June 1940 |

=== Round 10 ===
| Home team | Home team score | Away team | Away team score | Venue | Crowd | Date |
|---|---|---|---|---|---|---|
| North Melbourne | 13.11 (89) | Richmond | 17.16 (118) | Arden Street Oval | 11,000 | 29 June 1940 |
| Footscray | 15.15 (105) | South Melbourne | 6.10 (46) | Western Oval | 14,000 | 29 June 1940 |
| Collingwood | 12.17 (89) | Fitzroy | 15.13 (103) | Victoria Park | 14,000 | 29 June 1940 |
| Carlton | 13.11 (89) | Hawthorn | 13.18 (96) | Princes Park | 10,000 | 29 June 1940 |
| Melbourne | 22.19 (151) | Geelong | 24.10 (154) | MCG | 15,265 | 29 June 1940 |
| St Kilda | 14.18 (102) | Essendon | 15.14 (104) | Junction Oval | 15,000 | 29 June 1940 |

=== Round 11 ===
| Home team | Home team score | Away team | Away team score | Venue | Crowd | Date |
|---|---|---|---|---|---|---|
| Geelong | 12.22 (94) | St Kilda | 11.10 (76) | Corio Oval | 6,500 | 6 July 1940 |
| Fitzroy | 17.8 (110) | Footscray | 14.13 (97) | Brunswick Street Oval | 18,000 | 6 July 1940 |
| Essendon | 19.14 (128) | North Melbourne | 16.9 (105) | Windy Hill | 11,000 | 6 July 1940 |
| South Melbourne | 10.18 (78) | Melbourne | 19.16 (130) | Lake Oval | 10,000 | 6 July 1940 |
| Hawthorn | 10.17 (77) | Collingwood | 14.17 (101) | Glenferrie Oval | 10,000 | 6 July 1940 |
| Richmond | 9.11 (65) | Carlton | 9.22 (76) | Punt Road Oval | 18,000 | 6 July 1940 |

=== Round 12 ===
| Home team | Home team score | Away team | Away team score | Venue | Crowd | Date |
|---|---|---|---|---|---|---|
| Footscray | 12.10 (82) | Richmond | 15.10 (100) | Western Oval | 11,000 | 13 July 1940 |
| Collingwood | 19.14 (128) | South Melbourne | 4.18 (42) | Victoria Park | 6,500 | 13 July 1940 |
| Carlton | 11.24 (90) | Geelong | 12.19 (91) | Princes Park | 9,000 | 13 July 1940 |
| North Melbourne | 11.11 (77) | Hawthorn | 9.16 (70) | Arden Street Oval | 3,000 | 13 July 1940 |
| St Kilda | 8.11 (59) | Fitzroy | 6.12 (48) | Junction Oval | 10,000 | 13 July 1940 |
| Melbourne | 17.20 (122) | Essendon | 7.12 (54) | MCG | 18,640 | 13 July 1940 |

=== Round 13 ===
| Home team | Home team score | Away team | Away team score | Venue | Crowd | Date |
|---|---|---|---|---|---|---|
| Hawthorn | 17.17 (119) | St Kilda | 8.15 (63) | Glenferrie Oval | 8,000 | 20 July 1940 |
| Fitzroy | 16.17 (113) | North Melbourne | 9.13 (67) | Brunswick Street Oval | 10,000 | 20 July 1940 |
| Essendon | 13.17 (95) | Footscray | 13.13 (91) | Windy Hill | 17,000 | 20 July 1940 |
| Richmond | 13.9 (87) | Melbourne | 13.16 (94) | Punt Road Oval | 21,000 | 20 July 1940 |
| Geelong | 23.18 (156) | Collingwood | 12.19 (91) | Corio Oval | 8,500 | 20 July 1940 |
| South Melbourne | 17.11 (113) | Carlton | 14.14 (98) | Lake Oval | 8,000 | 20 July 1940 |

=== Round 14 ===
| Home team | Home team score | Away team | Away team score | Venue | Crowd | Date |
|---|---|---|---|---|---|---|
| North Melbourne | 6.11 (47) | St Kilda | 13.6 (84) | Arden Street Oval | 4,500 | 27 July 1940 |
| Footscray | 12.19 (91) | Melbourne | 15.20 (110) | Western Oval | 12,000 | 27 July 1940 |
| Fitzroy | 10.27 (87) | Geelong | 8.12 (60) | Brunswick Street Oval | 17,000 | 27 July 1940 |
| Carlton | 14.18 (102) | Collingwood | 13.9 (87) | Princes Park | 9,000 | 27 July 1940 |
| Richmond | 11.13 (79) | Hawthorn | 12.15 (87) | Punt Road Oval | 9,000 | 27 July 1940 |
| South Melbourne | 9.6 (60) | Essendon | 7.16 (58) | Lake Oval | 10,000 | 27 July 1940 |

=== Round 15 ===
| Home team | Home team score | Away team | Away team score | Venue | Crowd | Date |
|---|---|---|---|---|---|---|
| Hawthorn | 10.19 (79) | South Melbourne | 10.13 (73) | Glenferrie Oval | 8,000 | 10 August 1940 |
| Geelong | 12.15 (87) | Richmond | 16.11 (107) | Corio Oval | 10,000 | 10 August 1940 |
| Essendon | 10.12 (72) | Fitzroy | 10.15 (75) | Windy Hill | 18,000 | 10 August 1940 |
| Collingwood | 12.21 (93) | North Melbourne | 6.17 (53) | Victoria Park | 6,500 | 10 August 1940 |
| St Kilda | 13.9 (87) | Footscray | 15.22 (112) | Junction Oval | 13,000 | 10 August 1940 |
| Melbourne | 14.12 (96) | Carlton | 20.13 (133) | MCG | 16,500 | 10 August 1940 |

=== Round 16 ===
| Home team | Home team score | Away team | Away team score | Venue | Crowd | Date |
|---|---|---|---|---|---|---|
| Footscray | 17.22 (124) | North Melbourne | 8.13 (61) | Western Oval | 8,000 | 17 August 1940 |
| Collingwood | 12.18 (90) | Melbourne | 16.8 (104) | Victoria Park | 8,000 | 17 August 1940 |
| Carlton | 13.14 (92) | St Kilda | 6.16 (52) | Princes Park | 6,000 | 17 August 1940 |
| South Melbourne | 12.19 (91) | Geelong | 13.9 (87) | Lake Oval | 7,000 | 17 August 1940 |
| Richmond | 14.15 (99) | Fitzroy | 10.11 (71) | Punt Road Oval | 22,000 | 17 August 1940 |
| Hawthorn | 11.18 (84) | Essendon | 18.12 (120) | Glenferrie Oval | 9,000 | 17 August 1940 |

=== Round 17 ===
| Home team | Home team score | Away team | Away team score | Venue | Crowd | Date |
|---|---|---|---|---|---|---|
| North Melbourne | 8.5 (53) | South Melbourne | 16.23 (119) | Arden Street Oval | 5,000 | 24 August 1940 |
| St Kilda | 10.17 (77) | Richmond | 20.15 (135) | Junction Oval | 14,000 | 24 August 1940 |
| Melbourne | 26.20 (176) | Hawthorn | 8.14 (62) | MCG | 8,722 | 24 August 1940 |
| Geelong | 12.17 (89) | Footscray | 11.18 (84) | Corio Oval | 10,000 | 24 August 1940 |
| Essendon | 12.20 (92) | Collingwood | 6.16 (52) | Windy Hill | 13,000 | 24 August 1940 |
| Fitzroy | 10.11 (71) | Carlton | 21.14 (140) | Brunswick Street Oval | 20,000 | 24 August 1940 |

=== Round 18 ===
| Home team | Home team score | Away team | Away team score | Venue | Crowd | Date |
|---|---|---|---|---|---|---|
| Melbourne | 18.21 (129) | North Melbourne | 11.15 (81) | MCG | 5,500 | 31 August 1940 |
| Essendon | 16.16 (112) | Geelong | 7.10 (52) | Windy Hill | 13,000 | 31 August 1940 |
| Collingwood | 15.19 (109) | St Kilda | 10.15 (75) | Victoria Park | 6,000 | 31 August 1940 |
| Carlton | 15.12 (102) | Footscray | 11.14 (80) | Princes Park | 9,000 | 31 August 1940 |
| South Melbourne | 8.13 (61) | Richmond | 16.12 (108) | Lake Oval | 17,000 | 31 August 1940 |
| Hawthorn | 13.16 (94) | Fitzroy | 5.8 (38) | Glenferrie Oval | 5,500 | 31 August 1940 |

== Ladder ==
| (P) | Premiers |
| | Qualified for finals |

| # | Team | P | W | L | D | PF | PA | % | Pts |
|---|---|---|---|---|---|---|---|---|---|
| 1 | Melbourne (P) | 18 | 14 | 4 | 0 | 2110 | 1677 | 125.8 | 56 |
| 2 | Richmond | 18 | 12 | 6 | 0 | 1787 | 1489 | 120.0 | 48 |
| 3 | Essendon | 18 | 12 | 6 | 0 | 1611 | 1489 | 108.2 | 48 |
| 4 | Geelong | 18 | 11 | 7 | 0 | 1645 | 1599 | 102.9 | 44 |
| 5 | Carlton | 18 | 10 | 8 | 0 | 1730 | 1555 | 111.3 | 40 |
| 6 | Footscray | 18 | 9 | 9 | 0 | 1696 | 1558 | 108.9 | 36 |
| 7 | Fitzroy | 18 | 9 | 9 | 0 | 1443 | 1563 | 92.3 | 36 |
| 8 | Collingwood | 18 | 8 | 10 | 0 | 1621 | 1611 | 100.6 | 32 |
| 9 | Hawthorn | 18 | 7 | 11 | 0 | 1549 | 1760 | 88.0 | 28 |
| 10 | South Melbourne | 18 | 7 | 11 | 0 | 1480 | 1696 | 87.3 | 28 |
| 11 | St Kilda | 18 | 5 | 13 | 0 | 1418 | 1634 | 86.8 | 20 |
| 12 | North Melbourne | 18 | 4 | 14 | 0 | 1381 | 1840 | 75.1 | 16 |

Rules for classification: 1. premiership points; 2. percentage; 3. points for
Average score: 90.1
Source: AFL Tables

== Finals series ==
=== Semi-finals ===
| Home team | Score | Away team | Score | Venue | Crowd | Date |
|---|---|---|---|---|---|---|
| Essendon | 13.14 (92) | Geelong | 10.14 (74) | MCG | 44,187 | 7 September |
| Melbourne | 14.17 (101) | Richmond | 16.11 (107) | MCG | 54,763 | 14 September |

=== Preliminary final ===
| Home team | Score | Away team | Score | Venue | Crowd | Date |
|---|---|---|---|---|---|---|
| Melbourne | 12.18 (90) | Essendon | 12.13 (85) | MCG | 47,348 | 21 September |

== Season notes ==
- In April 1940, Essendon adopted the nickname The Bombers.
- In Round 7, Melbourne set a new record for most behinds in a match, kicking 34 behinds in a score of 12.34 (106). This record stood until 1977.
- The Round 10 match between Melbourne and Geelong produced an aggregate score of 46.29 (305). It was the first VFL match ever to see an aggregate of more than 300 points scored.
- The VFL suspended its round 15 matches and conducted a one-day lightning carnival, known as the Patriotic Premiership, at the Melbourne Cricket Ground on Saturday 3 August 1940 to raise money for the war effort. Each match was played over a single twenty-minute period without time-on. St Kilda 4.2 (26) defeated Richmond 0.2 (2) in the final. The carnival raised almost £3,000 for the war effort.
- The ANFC decided to cancel the 1940 Interstate Carnival, which was scheduled to have been held in Hobart, because of the war.
- In one of the most rugged seasons ever, 47 players were reported to the VFL Tribunal.
- In the last quarter of the Grand Final, Jack Titus scored a goal with his last kick, bringing his season's total to 100 goals.

== Awards ==
- The 1940 VFL Premiership team was Melbourne.
- The VFL's leading goalkicker was Jack "Skinny" Titus of Richmond with 92 goals (100 after finals).
- The joint winners of the 1940 Brownlow Medal were Herbie Matthews of South Melbourne and Des Fothergill of Collingwood with 32 votes each.
  - The rules of the award stated that there was only one medal to be awarded in any one season. A count-back revealed that each had the same number of 3, 2, and 1 votes; and, although the controversy associated with such a criterion being applied in the case of Stan Judkins in 1930 meant that it was never used again, having played the whole 18 home-and-away matches each, they could not have been separated on the basis of the number of matches played anyway.
  - The VFL announced the tied result and neither player received a medallion, but as a consequence of its 1981 decision to change its rules relating to tied Brownlow Medal contests, the AFL awarded retrospective medals to Matthews and Fothergill in 1989.
- North Melbourne took the "wooden spoon" in 1940.
- The seconds premiership was won by Collingwood. Collingwood 6.16 (52) defeated Carlton 3.12 (30) in the Grand Final, played as a curtain-raiser to the seniors Grand Final on Saturday 28 September at the Melbourne Cricket Ground.

== Sources ==
- 1940 VFL season at AFL Tables
- 1940 VFL season at Australian Football
