= Lindsay Johnston (Australian rules footballer) =

Australian rules footballer and umpire

Personal information
- Full name: Lindsay Gordon
- Born: 12 April 1937 (age 89)
- Original team: Kalgoorlie Railways

Playing career^{1}
Years	Club	Games (Goals)	
1959–1962	Swan Districts	27 (18)	

Umpiring career
Years	League	Role	Games
1965–1967 1969–1972	WANFL	Field umpire	91
- ^{1} Playing statistics correct to the end of 1962.

Career highlights
- WANFL Premiership player - 1961; WANFL Grand Final umpire - 1971

Lindsay Johnston (born 12 April 1937) is a former Australian rules football player and umpire. He played in the Western Australian National Football League (WANFL) for Swan Districts before becoming a WANFL umpire. He appeared in two WANFL Grand Finals, one as a premiership-winning player and one as an umpire.

== Playing career ==
Johnston began his football in Kalgoorlie, where he played for Kalgoorlie Railways. He was lured to Swan Districts in 1959 playing only a few league matches in his two years. In 1961 he only secured a regular spot late in the regular season but played in all of the club's finals, including the grand final. After a back injury early in 1962 he retired having played 27 league matches.

He made a return to football for Herne Hill (now Swan Athletic) for the 1968 season.

== Umpiring career ==
After beginning umpiring country football, Johnston made his league debut in 1965. After taking 1968 off to play football, he returned to league football the following year. He was appointed to the 1971 WANFL Grand Final. Johnston retired from umpiring after the 1972 WANFL season.
