= 1953 VFL Lightning Premiership =

- Season: 1953
- Teams: 12
- Winners: Richmond (1st title)
- Matches played: 11

The 1953 VFL Lightning Premiership was an Australian rules football knockout competition played entirely on Tuesday, 2 June. It was played on the same day as Elizabeth II's Coronation between rounds 6 and 7 of the Victorian Football League's 1953 season with all games played at the MCG. This was the sixth time a Lightning premiership had been contested in the VFL. It was contested by the 12 VFL teams who competed in the 1953 VFL season. A total of 36,715 people attended the competition. Richmond won its first Lightning Premiership competition defeating St Kilda in the final by 14 points.

== Matches ==
=== Round 1 ===
Home team	Home team score	Away team	Away team score	Ground	Date
Melbourne	1.1 (7)	South Melbourne	1.2 (8)	MCG	Tuesday, 2 June
Carlton	0.1 (1)	St Kilda	2.1 (13)	MCG	Tuesday, 2 June
Collingwood	3.2 (20)	Footscray	0.2 (2)	MCG	Tuesday, 2 June
Richmond	4.2 (26)	Fitzroy	2.0 (12)	MCG	Tuesday, 2 June
Essendon	2.2 (14)	Geelong	1.3 (9)	MCG	Tuesday, 2 June
Hawthorn	3.5 (23)	North Melbourne	2.2 (14)	MCG	Tuesday, 2 June

=== Quarter finals ===
Home team	Home team score	Away team	Away team score	Ground	Date
South Melbourne	2.2 (14)	St Kilda	3.3 (21)	MCG	Tuesday, 2 June
Footscray	0.3 (3)	Richmond	1.2 (8)	MCG	Tuesday, 2 June
Bye: Essendon, Hawthorn

=== Semi finals ===
Home team	Home team score	Away team	Away team score	Ground	Date
Essendon	2.1 (13)	St Kilda	2.5 (17)	MCG	Tuesday, 2 June
Hawthorn	1.0 (6)	Richmond	1.1 (7)	MCG	Tuesday, 2 June

== Grand final ==
Home team	Home team score	Away team	Away team score	Ground	Date
St Kilda	1.3 (9)	Richmond	3.5 (23)	MCG	Tuesday, 2 June

== See also ==
- List of Australian Football League night premiers
- Australian Football League pre-season competition
- 1953 VFL season
