= 1940 VFL Lightning Premiership =

- Season: 1940
- Teams: 12
- Winners: St Kilda (1st title)
- Matches played: 11

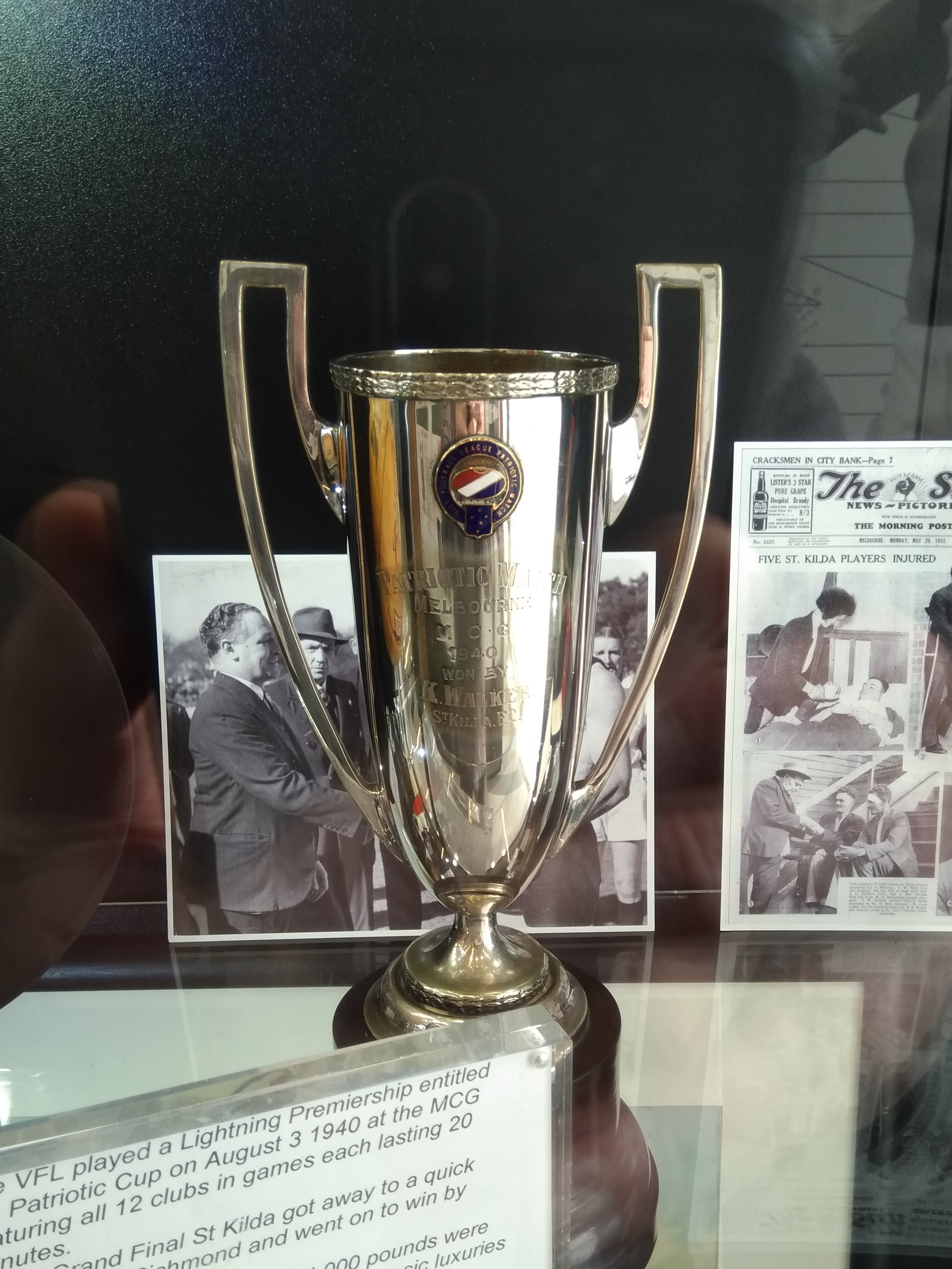
The 1940 Patriotic Cup "Lightening Premiership" Trophy.

The 1940 VFL Lightning Premiership (known at the time as the Patriotic Premiership) was an Australian rules football knockout competition played entirely on Saturday, 3 August 1940, at the Melbourne Cricket Ground (MCG). It was played during a week's break of the Victorian Football Leagues's 1940 season between Rounds 14 and 15. It was contested by the 12 teams who competed in the 1940 VFL season. A total of 30,407 witnessed the day's matches. St Kilda won the lighting premiership competition, defeating Richmond in the final by 24 points. It was the first premiership of any kind at any grade that the St Kilda Football Club had won in its history.

This was the first time a lightning premiership had been contested in the VFL. The tournament was played to raise money for the Patriotic Fund during World War II; similar tournaments were held in other leagues, including the South Australian National Football League (SANFL), around the same time.

== Format ==
The Patriotic Premiership was staged as a knock-out tournament amongst the twelve VFL teams on a single day. Because twelve teams is not enough for a balanced knock-out tournament, the draw was arranged such that the teams which occupied the bottom four places on the league ladder at the time of the tournament had an easier path to the final.

Each match lasted for twenty minutes, without time-on, played in a single continuous period.

== Matches ==
=== Round 1 ===
	Round 1
Saturday, 3 August (11:30 am)	North Melbourne 2.6 (18)	def.	South Melbourne 1.2 (8)	Melbourne Cricket Ground
Saturday, 3 August (12:00 pm)	Hawthorn 2.2 (14)	def. by	St Kilda 3.2 (20)	Melbourne Cricket Ground
Saturday, 3 August (12:30 pm)	Melbourne 0.1 (1)	def. by	Richmond 5.5 (35)	Melbourne Cricket Ground
Saturday, 3 August (1:00 pm)	Collingwood 2.4 (16)	def. by	Footscray 4.2 (26)	Melbourne Cricket Ground
Saturday, 3 August (1:30 pm)	Essendon 3.1 (19)	def. by	Fitzroy 4.2 (26)	Melbourne Cricket Ground
Saturday, 3 August (2:00 pm)	Carlton 2.3 (15)	def.	Geelong 0.4 (4)	Melbourne Cricket Ground

=== Quarterfinals ===
	Quarterfinals
Saturday, 3 August (2:30 pm)	Richmond 1.2 (8)	def.	Footscray 1.0 (6)	Melbourne Cricket Ground
Saturday, 3 August (3:00 pm)	Fitzroy 1.2 (8)	def. by	Carlton 3.3 (21)	Melbourne Cricket Ground
	Bye; North Melbourne, St Kilda

=== Semifinals ===
	Semifinals
Saturday, 3 August (3:30 pm)	North Melbourne 2.2 (14)	def. by	Richmond 5.0 (30)	Melbourne Cricket Ground
Saturday, 3 August (4:00 pm)	St Kilda 1.4 (10)	def.	Carlton 1.2 (8)	Melbourne Cricket Ground

== Grand Final ==
	Grand Final
Saturday, 3 August (4:30 pm)	Richmond 0.2 (2)	def. by	St Kilda 4.2 (26)	Melbourne Cricket Ground (crowd: 30,407)

== See also ==
- List of Australian Football League night premiers
- Australian Football League pre-season competition
- 1940 VFL season
