= 1952 VFL Lightning Premiership =

- Season: 1952
- Teams: 12
- Winners: Melbourne (1st title)
- Matches played: 11

The 1952 VFL Lightning Premiership was an Australian rules football knockout competition played entirely on Saturday, 24 May. It was played on the Empire Day holiday between rounds 5 and 6 of the Victorian Football League's 1952 season with all games played at the MCG. This was the fifth time a lightning premiership had been contested in the VFL. It was contested by the 12 VFL teams who competed in the 1952 VFL season. A total of 33,719 people attended the competition. Melbourne won its first Lighting Premiership competition defeating South Melbourne in the final by 7 points.

== Matches ==
=== Round 1 ===
Home team	Home team score	Away team	Away team score	Ground	Date
Collingwood	4.3 (27)	Hawthorn	0.4 (4)	MCG	Saturday, 24 May
Carlton	1.1 (7)	Fitzroy	2.0 (12)	MCG	Saturday, 24 May
Essendon	1.2 (8)	Melbourne	2.2 (14)	MCG	Saturday, 24 May
Geelong	1.4 (10)	Richmond	1.1 (7)	MCG	Saturday, 24 May
South Melbourne	4.5 (29)	St Kilda	0.0 (0)	MCG	Saturday, 24 May
Footscray	1.0 (6)	North Melbourne	4.6 (30)	MCG	Saturday, 24 May

=== Quarter finals ===
Home team	Home team score	Away team	Away team score	Ground	Date
Collingwood	1.2 (8)	Fitzroy	0.0 (0)	MCG	Saturday, 24 May
Melbourne	4.1 (25)	Geelong	1.2 (8)	MCG	Saturday, 24 May
Bye: South Melbourne, North Melbourne

=== Semi finals ===
Home team	Home team score	Away team	Away team score	Ground	Date
South Melbourne	3.5 (23)	Collingwood	2.1 (13)	MCG	Saturday, 24 May
North Melbourne	2.1 (13)	Melbourne	2.5 (17)	MCG	Saturday, 24 May

== Grand final ==
Home team	Home team score	Away team	Away team score	Ground	Date
South Melbourne	0.1 (1)	Melbourne	1.2 (8)	MCG	Saturday, 24 May

== See also ==
- List of Australian Football League night premiers
- Australian Football League pre-season competition
- 1952 VFL season
