= 1967 WANFL season =

Australian rules football season

- Teams: 8
- Premiers: Perth; 4th premiership
- Minor premiers: East Perth; 11th minor premiership
- Sandover Medallist: Bill Walker (Swan Districts); John Parkinson (Claremont)
- Leading goalkicker: Phil Tierney (East Perth)
- Matches played: 88

The 1967 WANFL season was the 83rd season of the various incarnations of the Western Australian National Football League. Its most salient feature was the decline of East Fremantle, the league's most successful club, to its worst season since its inaugural 1898 season. Old Easts – having during the first two-thirds of the century never won fewer than ten matches in a season – won only seven and finished second-last after looking set for a still-worse record during the first fifteen rounds. Their appointed captain-coach Bert Thornley resigned after twelve matches due to the club's bad form and his desire to play for Carlton in 1968. The blue and whites suffered severely from a bad run of injuries and form lapses amongst senior players like Sorrell, Spriggs, Rogers and Casserly, plus a serious weakness in attack due to the loss of Bob Johnson. Despite regaining Austin Robertson and acquiring Johnson, Subiaco continued their disastrous form of late 1966 for their worst season since 1953, as the loss of Slater and injuries to Brian Sarre left them decrepit in the ruck and defence.

Future Hall of Fame coach John Todd had his first major success, lifting 1965 and 1966 wooden spooners South Fremantle to their third finals berth and first victory since 1956. Early in the season the red and whites were the nearest rivals to East Perth, who won fifteen of their first sixteen matches before fading. Perth had been a 2/1 flag favourite before the season started but lost six of their first eleven matches before coming back to always have the edge on East Perth during August and September. Claremont, after a frustrating 1966, recovered from a disastrous start before being denied a finals berth in the last few minutes.

A lowlight was a career-ending knee injury to champion West Perth centre half-back Brian France on 8 July against East Fremantle. At the time France had polled eighteen votes in the Sandover Medal and was still within one vote of tying despite playing only thirteen full games.

== Home-and-away season ==
=== Round 1 ===
	Round 1
Saturday, 8 April	South Fremantle 17.13 (115)	def.	Subiaco 10.16 (76)	Fremantle Oval (crowd: 8268)
Saturday, 8 April	East Perth 21.13 (139)	def.	Swan Districts 15.23 (113)	Perth Oval (crowd: 12734)
Saturday, 8 April	Claremont 8.17 (65)	def. by	West Perth 15.15 (105)	Claremont Oval (crowd: 10688)
Saturday, 8 April	Perth 20.23 (143)	def.	East Fremantle 8.13 (61)	Lathlain Park (crowd: 10414)
Subiaco's star forwards Robertson – who played unsuccessfully at centre half-forward – and Johnson do not live up to their reputations and the Maroons' sluggishness around the ground means South Fremantle are always winning.

=== Round 2 ===
	Round 2
Saturday, 15 April	West Perth 14.13 (97)	def. by	South Fremantle 16.17 (113)	Leederville Oval (crowd: 12625)
Saturday, 15 April	Swan Districts 15.19 (109)	def.	Perth 14.17 (101)	Bassendean Oval (crowd: 9119)
Saturday, 15 April	Subiaco 17.11 (113)	def.	Claremont 15.8 (98)	Subiaco Oval (crowd: 6750)
Saturday, 15 April	East Fremantle 8.9 (57)	def. by	East Perth 12.16 (88)	East Fremantle Oval (crowd: 8150)
Keith Slater, Tony Nesbit and Bill Walker team wonderfully to down the flag favourites in a thrilling match where at the start Perth – especially Graham Jenzen with 1.7 (13) – fritter away chances to get a decisive break.

=== Round 3 ===
	Round 3
Saturday, 22 April	South Fremantle 13.14 (92)	def. by	Swan Districts 18.23 (131)	Fremantle Oval (crowd: 11363)
Saturday, 22 April	West Perth 9.13 (67)	def. by	Perth 18.24 (132)	Leederville Oval (crowd: 10351)
Saturday, 22 April	East Perth 25.10 (160)	def.	Subiaco 16.14 (110)	Perth Oval (crowd: 8528)
Saturday, 22 April	Claremont 8.16 (64)	def.	East Fremantle 6.12 (48)	Claremont Oval (crowd: 5538)
East Perth become the only undefeated club as they crush a Subiaco team minus key defender Sarre, leaving Tierney to score eleven goals off superb running by Doncon and new father Chadwick.; Six goals from half-forward flanker Turnbull and fine roving by Bill Walker and Terry Harris ensure an end to South Fremantle's fine beginning.

=== Round 4 ===
	Round 4
Saturday, 29 April	Subiaco 9.16 (70)	def. by	Swan Districts 18.10 (118)	Subiaco Oval (crowd: 7000)
Saturday, 29 April	West Perth 16.11 (107)	def. by	East Perth 18.16 (124)	Leederville Oval (crowd: 13860)
Saturday, 29 April	Perth 18.19 (127)	def.	Claremont 11.9 (75)	Lathlain Park (crowd: 8661)
Saturday, 29 April	East Fremantle 9.8 (62)	def. by	South Fremantle 10.16 (76)	East Fremantle Oval (crowd: 11600)
Brilliant play by Jackson – who had been shaded by Whinnen for three quarters – takes the game from West Perth via four goals in the final five minutes to inflict a third straight defeat upon the Cardinals.

=== Round 5 ===
	Round 5
Saturday, 6 May	Subiaco 10.11 (71)	def. by	West Perth 13.10 (88)	Subiaco Oval (crowd: 10000)
Saturday, 6 May	South Fremantle 21.10 (136)	def.	Perth 17.11 (113)	Fremantle Oval (crowd: 12506)
Saturday, 6 May	East Perth 20.12 (132)	def.	Claremont 11.9 (75)	Perth Oval (crowd: 9967)
Saturday, 6 May	Swan Districts 22.16 (148)	def.	East Fremantle 13.15 (93)	Bassendean Oval (crowd: 8586)
28-year-old veteran Gerovich – in the reserves since August 1966 – produces a spectacular display at half-forward and with Peter Dougan equally brilliant on the other flank South Fremantle demolish a surprisingly weak Demon defence, taking an astonishing 110 marks to 44.

=== Round 6 ===
	Round 6
Saturday, 13 May	Swan Districts 9.11 (65)	def. by	West Perth 14.14 (98)	Bassendean Oval (crowd: 11156)
Saturday, 13 May	Perth 12.16 (88)	def. by	East Perth 17.15 (117)	Lathlain Park (crowd: 19541)
Saturday, 13 May	Claremont 10.9 (69)	def. by	South Fremantle 12.14 (86)	Claremont Oval (crowd: 8428)
Saturday, 13 May	East Fremantle 10.12 (72)	def.	Subiaco 10.6 (66)	East Fremantle Oval (crowd: 6820)
A record crowd for four Saturday matches of 45,945 sees the football. The highlight and main attraction is East Perth's superb form against Perth, that leaves the Royals with only one loss in four grades after six weeks.; Flanker John Vukman covers West Perth's forward weaknesses to permit the Cardinals to arrest a worrying recent slump. Without Slater, Swan Districts' ruck was as anaemic as it proved during the following disastrous season. The Cardinals had to call on former champion Ray Schofield as runner after official runner Porter pulled a muscle early in the game.

=== Round 7 ===
	Round 7
Saturday, 20 May	South Fremantle 18.17 (125)	def.	East Perth 11.19 (85)	Fremantle Oval (crowd: 17200)
Saturday, 20 May	Subiaco 13.8 (86)	def. by	Perth 21.18 (144)	Subiaco Oval (crowd: 7000)
Saturday, 20 May	Claremont 20.13 (133)	def.	Swan Districts 12.6 (78)	Claremont Oval (crowd: 6401)
Saturday, 20 May	West Perth 11.14 (80)	def.	East Fremantle 10.10 (70)	Leederville Oval (crowd: 10024)
A brilliant display against Jackson by Gary Greer and fine marking by Graham Scott at centre half-forward allows the twice wooden-spooners to be only percentage from the top after the clubs have met each other once– inflicting on the Royals' second loss in any grade.; Subiaco's lack of match fitness is exposed when they score only 3.1 (19) to 9.4 (58) with a wind during the final quarter after two good stanzas in the middle of the match.

=== Round 8 ===
	Round 8
Saturday, 27 May	Subiaco 10.9 (69)	def. by	South Fremantle 17.16 (118)	Subiaco Oval (crowd: 4750)
Saturday, 27 May	Swan Districts 12.16 (88)	def. by	East Perth 16.15 (111)	Bassendean Oval (crowd: 6225)
Saturday, 27 May	West Perth 8.12 (60)	def. by	Claremont 13.12 (90)	Leederville Oval (crowd: 7359)
Saturday, 27 May	East Fremantle 7.8 (50)	def. by	Perth 22.16 (148)	East Fremantle Oval (crowd: 6346)
With captain-coach Atwell dominant in his new role of ruckman, plus Cable and Jenzen gathering a combined 45 kicks and seven goals, Perth inflict what is still their biggest win over Old Easts. East Fremantle's forward line had so little influence Demon full-back Mal Windsor had just three kicks and one mark.

=== Round 9 (Foundation Day) ===
	Round 9
Saturday, 3 June	Claremont 16.14 (110)	def.	Subiaco 9.6 (60)	Claremont Oval (crowd: 9810)
Saturday, 3 June	East Perth 11.18 (84)	def.	East Fremantle 10.11 (71)	Perth Oval (crowd: 12386)
Monday, 5 June	South Fremantle 8.15 (63)	def. by	West Perth 12.11 (83)	Fremantle Oval (crowd: 11703)
Monday, 5 June	Perth 10.9 (69)	def. by	Swan Districts 15.13 (103)	Lathlain Park (crowd: 11703)
The move of full-forward "Boomer" Harvey to the ruck and centre half-forward Lorne Cook to centre half-back leaves Claremont with a crushing ruck dominance over a lamentably weak Maroon outfit that cannot counter either McIntosh's palming or Harvey's work around the ground – which brought him five goals – and only a casual second half by the Tigers prevented an annihilation.; Relentless pressure allows Swan Districts to hold fourth position, as Cable and Jenzen are tagged superbly in the wet and half-forward Geoff McMurray consistently brings his fellow Swan attackers into the game.

=== Round 10 ===
	Round 10
Saturday, 10 June	Swan Districts 10.10 (70)	def. by	South Fremantle 13.14 (92)	Bassendean Oval (crowd: 7073)
Saturday, 10 June	West Perth 16.25 (121)	def.	Perth 10.13 (73)	Leederville Oval (crowd: 8612)
Saturday, 10 June	Subiaco 11.6 (72)	def. by	East Perth 10.13 (73)	Subiaco Oval (crowd: 4500)
Saturday, 10 June	East Fremantle 13.9 (87)	def.	Claremont 11.10 (76)	East Fremantle Oval (crowd: 6076)
Bill Dempsey and three lesser lights – Ray Boyanich, John McArthur and Rod White – produce a superb wet-weather display to demolish the reigning premiers with a remarkable 8.9 (57)-to-nothing final quarter.; East Perth, who lost star rover Doncon and wingman Chadwick early in the match, come home for a thrilling victory over bottom club Subiaco, whose youthful enthusiasm is defeated by Hay holding "Ocker" to 2.1 (13).

=== Round 11 ===
	Round 11
Saturday, 17 June	Swan Districts 13.19 (97)	def. by	Subiaco 19.19 (133)	Bassendean Oval (crowd: 5340)
Saturday, 17 June	East Perth 11.17 (83)	def.	West Perth 11.16 (82)	Perth Oval (crowd: 14602)
Saturday, 17 June	Claremont 18.14 (122)	def.	Perth 14.13 (97)	Claremont Oval (crowd: 7077)
Saturday, 17 June	South Fremantle 17.14 (116)	def.	East Fremantle 6.16 (52)	Fremantle Oval (crowd: 11400)
Eddie Pitter's improved mobility provides a perfect response to criticism of East Perth's ruck – his solid marking and position play with the Royals a second successive come-from-behind thriller.; Claremont's superbly-skilled half-forwards Elphick and Dick Walker run over Perth during the second half to leave the Demons – whose vaunted defence had turned brittle – in the four only by 18.74 percent from the Swans and Tigers.

=== Round 12 ===
	Round 12
Saturday, 24 June	West Perth 20.17 (137)	def.	Subiaco 16.16 (112)	Leederville Oval (crowd: 9804)
Saturday, 24 June	Perth 12.24 (96)	def.	South Fremantle 8.7 (55)	Lathlain Park (crowd: 11483)
Saturday, 24 June	Claremont 15.14 (104)	def. by	East Perth 18.9 (117)	Claremont Oval (crowd: 11092)
Saturday, 24 June	East Fremantle 14.16 (100)	def. by	Swan Districts 17.9 (111)	East Fremantle Oval (crowd: 6500)
Despite scoring nine behinds before their first major and 3.13 (31) to half-time, Perth produce the vigour and power of 1966 for almost the first time to maintain constant command. Newcomers Greg Bennett, Ross Millson and Kevin Wilson dominate the South Fremantle centreline.; A surprise move of half-forward Bill Holmes on to upstart Old East full-forward Neil Dedman – who kicked six on regular full-back John O‘Neill – allows Swan Districts a hard-fought win over the bottom club to stay within percentage of the four.

=== Round 13 ===
	Round 13
Saturday, 1 July	Swan Districts 9.8 (62)	def. by	West Perth 12.20 (92)	Bassendean Oval (crowd: 9100)
Saturday, 1 July	East Perth 14.16 (100)	def.	Perth 12.17 (89)	Perth Oval (crowd: 16368)
Saturday, 1 July	South Fremantle 16.11 (107)	def.	Claremont 12.10 (82)	Fremantle Oval (crowd: 10022)
Saturday, 1 July	Subiaco 14.7 (91)	def. by	East Fremantle 15.17 (107)	Subiaco Oval (crowd: 5000)
A seven-goal Royal third quarter with the breeze compensates for three indifferent stanzas to leave Perth again in the four only by percentage. Chadwick's brilliant work on the wing in his comeback from injury was decisive.

=== Round 14 ===
	Round 14
Saturday, 8 July	East Perth 16.19 (115)	def.	South Fremantle 7.10 (52)	Perth Oval (crowd: 19098)
Saturday, 8 July	Perth 16.16 (112)	def.	Subiaco 14.10 (94)	Lathlain Park (crowd: 8331)
Saturday, 8 July	Swan Districts 9.9 (63)	def. by	Claremont 18.9 (117)	Bassendean Oval (crowd: 7270)
Saturday, 8 July	East Fremantle 11.15 (81)	def. by	West Perth 19.20 (134)	East Fremantle Oval (crowd: 8451)
East Perth gain revenge for their solitary loss so far as a tremendous centreline of O‘Donoghue, Chadwick and Gillespie, along with brilliant half-forward Jackson, rise along with rovers Doncon and Verstegen to brilliant heights in the last quarter when the Royals score 9.7 (61) to nothing after an even three quarters.; John Nykyforak and Craig Baker produce a brilliant roving display to crush a strong Old East challenge by scoring 9.7 (61) to 2.4 (16) after the Cardinals did not goal in the third quarter and lost Brian France to his career-ending injury.

=== Round 15 ===
	Round 15
Saturday, 15 July	South Fremantle 15.11 (101)	def.	Subiaco 7.3 (45)	Fremantle Oval (crowd: 5137)
Saturday, 15 July	Swan Districts 17.13 (115)	def. by	East Perth 18.12 (120)	Bassendean Oval (crowd: 4798)
Saturday, 15 July	Claremont 13.10 (88)	def.	West Perth 4.8 (32)	Claremont Oval (crowd: 7590)
Saturday, 15 July	Perth 15.16 (106)	def.	East Fremantle 2.4 (16)	Lathlain Park (crowd: 4248)
With 45 possessions from Cable in the wet and four goals at centre half-forward from Gerry Iseger, Perth hold East Fremantle scoreless between the ten-minute mark of the opening quarter and five minutes into the last, setting several notable records: 1. Old Easts' score remains their lowest since kicking 2.2 (14) against Perth in Round 9 of 1915.; 2. It constituted the lowest score by any WA(N)FL team between Round 4, 1956 and Round 12, 1995.; 3. It was the only time an open-age WA(N)FL team was scoreless in the second and third quarters between Subiaco against Perth in Round 1 of 1921 and the Demons against West Perth in Round 18 of 1998. (Note: In Round 14 of the 1942 under-age competition, Claremont were also scoreless in the second and third quarters against East Perth.); In a superb match in wet, muddy conditions, East Perth prevail in a goal-for-goal last quarter as Mal Brown's dominance at centre half-forward is exploited by the brilliant Doncon and Verstegen. Full-forward Eric Gorman is superb for Swans with 8.3 (51).; In the Fremantle Oval match, 200-game veteran Gerovich and 100-game Maroon "Ocker" Robertson specially tossed the coin, whilst in the match South proved much too good in the rainy weather.

=== Interstate match ===
Interstate match
Saturday, 22 July	Western Australia	def.	South Australia	Subiaco Oval (crowd: 36,129)
4.3 (27); 9.11 (65); 16.15 (111); 20.19 (139)	Q1; Q2; Q3; Final	3.2 (20); 5.2 (32); 7.3 (45); 10.5 (65)	Umpires: P. Sheals; Simpson Medal: Bill Walker (Western Australia)
Walker 6.3; Robertson 4.1; Boyanich, Slater 2.1; Farmer, Doncon 1.5; Cable 1.4; Brown, Lewis 1.2; Brehaut, Jackson 1.0	Goals	4.1 Shearman; 2.1 Freeman; 2.0 Simunsen; 1.0 Roberts, Pannenburg; 0.2 Darley; 0.1 Sachse
Jackson, Walker, McIntosh, Brehaut, Graham, Boyanich	Best	Adcock, Shearman, Roberts, Elleway, Schmidt, Darley
Dempsey (hand)	Injuries	Bagshaw (ankle); Freeman (shin)
A top-heavy South Australian team is overwhelmed by Western Australia's speed around the packs and skill in moving the ball at great pace.

=== Round 16 ===
	Round 16
Saturday, 29 July	Subiaco 14.12 (96)	def. by	Swan Districts 14.13 (97)	Subiaco Oval (crowd: 5000)
Saturday, 29 July	West Perth 12.14 (86)	def. by	East Perth 25.10 (160)	Leederville Oval (crowd: 12820)
Saturday, 29 July	Claremont 10.10 (70)	def. by	Perth 14.11 (95)	Claremont Oval (crowd: 9030)
Saturday, 29 July	East Fremantle 12.18 (90)	def.	South Fremantle 8.15 (63)	East Fremantle Oval (crowd: 7100)
East Perth produce a brilliant display of attacking football to confirm their flag favouritism and drop West Perth to fourth. East Perth's pace, especially that of Jackson, was quite amazing.

=== Round 17 ===
	Round 17
Saturday, 5 August	South Fremantle 18.14 (122)	def.	Swan Districts 13.14 (92)	Fremantle Oval (crowd: 9265)
Saturday, 5 August	Perth 19.19 (133)	def.	West Perth 12.8 (80)	Lathlain Park (crowd: 11979)
Saturday, 5 August	East Perth 14.18 (102)	def. by	Subiaco 19.9 (123)	Perth Oval (crowd: 9297)
Saturday, 5 August	Claremont 17.22 (124)	def.	East Fremantle 9.12 (66)	Claremont Oval (crowd: 7726)
In a match affected by a malfunctioning siren that delayed half-time by thirty seconds, Subiaco produce a huge upset as their accuracy plus rookie Dearle's dominance over Chadwick keeps them ahead all afternoon.; West Perth put up a heroic fight against injuries but cannot cope with Perth's manpower advantage in the final quarter, when Rowland and Nykyforak depart to permit Perth to score 8.5 (53) – which pleases Mal Atwell because of the toughness of the earlier football.

=== Round 18 ===
	Round 18
Saturday, 12 August	West Perth 20.23 (143)	def.	South Fremantle 16.5 (101)	Leederville Oval (crowd: 11948)
Saturday, 12 August	Perth 13.19 (97)	def. by	Swan Districts 15.16 (106)	Lathlain Park (crowd: 9677)
Saturday, 12 August	Subiaco 11.10 (76)	def. by	Claremont 18.19 (127)	Subiaco Oval (crowd: 7800)
Saturday, 12 August	East Fremantle 7.14 (56)	def. by	East Perth 14.15 (99)	East Fremantle Oval (crowd: 6813)
Despite a brilliant 8.2 (50) from Gerovich, West Perth – with captain coach Spargo back, Whinnen producing his best display of 1967 and Dempsey capably filling France's boots – produce their best display of 1967 to remain fourth.; Claremont still fail to enter the four despite scoring 8.13 (61) to 1.1 (7) into the breeze following a very poor match apart from young Maroon defender Peter Eakins for three quarters.

=== Round 19 ===
	Round 19
Saturday, 19 August	Subiaco 13.14 (92)	def. by	West Perth 17.24 (126)	Subiaco Oval (crowd: 8851)
Saturday, 19 August	South Fremantle 10.14 (74)	def. by	Perth 17.16 (118)	Fremantle Oval (crowd: 11259)
Saturday, 19 August	East Perth 13.10 (88)	def. by	Claremont 14.13 (97)	Perth Oval (crowd: 13500)
Saturday, 19 August	Swan Districts 15.15 (105)	def. by	East Fremantle 15.18 (108)	Bassendean Oval (crowd: 4547)
Despite losing John McIntosh after that player had moved forward to score 5.2 (32), Claremont continue a comeback from 34 points behind at half-time against the league leaders and stay in the finals race.; After being un-nerved by an opening all-in brawl and seeing South Fremantle go to a 49-point lead early in the second quarter, Perth produce an amazing turnaround to score 16.16 (112) to 2.7 (19) for the rest of the match and gain the chance to break the red and whites' hold on the double chance with their good percentage.; In the opening brawl, Perth captain-coach Atwell was reported for jumping into the back of Graham Scott and suspended for three weeks, which kept him out until the Grand Final.

=== Round 20 ===
	Round 20
Saturday, 26 August	West Perth 17.19 (121)	def.	Swan Districts 9.10 (64)	Leederville Oval (crowd: 8334)
Saturday, 26 August	East Perth 12.13 (85)	def. by	Perth 16.8 (104)	Perth Oval (crowd: 15076)
Saturday, 26 August	Claremont 16.8 (104)	def.	South Fremantle 15.11 (101)	Claremont Oval (crowd: 11626)
Saturday, 26 August	East Fremantle 14.11 (95)	def.	Subiaco 5.9 (39)	East Fremantle Oval (crowd: 4099)
Bob Shields, unsuccessful in attack, does a superb job in the absence of suspended captain-coach Atwell to give the Demons a crucial win that takes them to second position by 19.9 percent – and having only to defeat bottom team Subiaco to stay there.

=== Round 21 ===
	Round 21
Saturday, 2 September	East Perth 11.10 (76)	def.	South Fremantle 9.9 (63)	Perth Oval (crowd: 10251)
Saturday, 2 September	Perth 13.18 (96)	def.	Subiaco 5.8 (38)	Lathlain Park (crowd: 4010)
Saturday, 2 September	Swan Districts 9.6 (60)	def.	Claremont 5.9 (39)	Bassendean Oval (crowd: 4671)
Saturday, 2 September	East Fremantle 9.12 (66)	def.	West Perth 4.7 (31)	East Fremantle Oval (crowd: 6723)
7.4 (46) in the final quarter in shocking conditions – including four goals in the final five minutes – prevents Claremont finishing in the four after they had previously entered it for the only time all season. The movement of back pocket Netherway to a wing proves a matchwinning move for Castledine during his last match as Swan captain-coach.; East Fremantle, with a number of promising young players, cap off a solid late-season revival as Harry Neesham, Don Lang and Trevor Sprigg are too solid for the Cardinal attack, whilst Fred Lewis helps the blue and whites to six last-quarter goals after only that number had been kicked in three quarters.

== Ladder ==
1967 ladder
Pos	Team	Pld	W	L	D	PF	PA	PP	Pts
1	East Perth	21	17	4	0	2258	1877	120.3	68
2	Perth (P)	21	13	8	0	2281	1765	129.2	52
3	South Fremantle	21	12	9	0	1971	1868	105.5	48
4	West Perth	21	12	9	0	1970	1908	103.2	48
5	Claremont	21	11	10	0	1929	1798	107.3	44
6	Swan Districts	21	9	12	0	1995	2143	93.1	36
7	East Fremantle	21	7	14	0	1508	1992	75.7	28
8	Subiaco	21	3	18	0	1732	2293	75.5	12

Source: WAFL Footy Facts
Rules for classification: 1) points; 2) percentage; 3) number of points for.
(P) Premiers

== Finals ==
=== First semi-final ===
	First semi-final
Saturday, 9 September	South Fremantle 13.22 (100)	def.	West Perth 8.13 (61)	Subiaco Oval (crowd: 30,517)
South Fremantle's strong ruck allows it to have little trouble with West Perth, as Fred Senior and Ivan Glucina beat the more experienced Boyanich and Brian Sampson in the red and whites' first final for five seasons.

=== Second semi-final ===
	Second semi-final
Saturday, 16 September	East Perth 8.10 (58)	def. by	Perth 9.9 (63)	Subiaco Oval (crowd: 28,494)
In a torrid low-scoring affair in dry but mild and windy weather, Perth hold on when East Perth wingman Gary Gillespie refuses a shot to win from 70 yards (64 m) on the boundary.

=== Preliminary final ===
	Preliminary final
Saturday, 23 September	East Perth 20.18 (138)	def.	South Fremantle 13.20 (98)	Subiaco Oval (crowd: 27,304)
East Perth kick 14.14 (98) after half-time – including 9.4 (58) to 2.6 (18) into the wind in the final stanza – for their most convincing performance since the end of July. A switch of key forwards Tierney and Mal Brown, plus seven goals from Jackson, completely revitalises the Royals' attack.

=== Grand Final ===
1967 WANFL Grand Final
Saturday, 30 September	Perth	def.	East Perth	Subiaco Oval (crowd: 42,625)
3.5 (23); 9.9 (63); 12.9 (81); 18.12 (120)	Q1; Q2; Q3; Final	4.2 (26); 7.4 (46); 13.7 (85); 15.12 (102)	Umpires: Ray Scott; Simpson Medal: Barry Cable (Perth)
Atwell 6, Iseger 4, Dalton 3, Astone 2, Jenzen 2, Bennett	Goals	Tierney 4, Verstegen 3, Doncon 2, Brown, Garnaut, Kennedy, Pitter, Jackson, Evans
Atwell, Cable, Astone, Dalton, Ramshaw, Isegar, Edwards, Lawrence	Best	Doncon, Gillespie, Chadwick, Pitter, Smith, Kennedy, Tierney
Bennett (cramp)	Injuries	Freemantle (blow on face); O‘Donoghue (heavy knock)
In the unfamiliar full-forward role after six weeks off the field due to suspension, Mal Atwell score 6.1 (37), whilst his keeping Jenzen and Cable together on the ball prove decisive in 80 °F (26.7 °C) heat.
