= 1972 WANFL season =

Australian rules football season

- Teams: 8
- Premiers: East Perth; 13th premiership
- Minor premiers: Claremont; 4th minor premiership
- Sandover Medallist: Ian Miller (Perth)
- Leading goalkicker: Austin Robertson, Jr. (Subiaco)
- Matches played: 88

The 1972 WANFL season was the 88th season of the various incarnations of the Western Australian National Football League. It saw East Perth, after five Grand Final losses in six seasons and a frustrating seven since their last premiership in 1959, break the drought against a Claremont team that had achieved its first minor premiership since Johnny Leonard's days, despite kicking into the wind after winning the toss.

The two clubs established their supremacy from early in the season, and the battle for the last place in the four was won by reigning premiers West Perth despite losing eight of their last ten matches.

1971 preliminary finalists East Fremantle, equal favourites for the premiership with Claremont in the pre-season were affected by form lapses and controversial behaviour by coach Alan Joyce, who in June refused to allow Old Easts players selected in the state team to train there rather than at East Fremantle Oval. A game behind the Cardinals after eleven matches, the blue and whites could themselves win only thrice, whilst South Fremantle in a rebuilding phase under Mal Atwell and without key players Hassa Mann, Graham Scott and Len Clark lost nine on end but did uncover players like Bruce Monteath who would help them become a WA(N)FL power between 1975 and 1983.

An unfancied but revitalised Perth under captain-coach Barry Cable were the Tigers' and Royals' nearest rival but could not win any of seven matches against them, whilst Subiaco, fancied before the season and showing an innovative "Think Subi" campaign but affected by off-field disputes involving the sacking of returning veteran Cam Blakemore, were last or second-last for eight rounds before a five-game winning streak had them theoretically in contention for the four with two rounds to play.

== Home-and-away season ==
=== Round 1 (Easter weekend) ===
	Round 1
Saturday, 1 April	East Perth 23.26 (164)	def.	Swan Districts 11.13 (79)	Perth Oval (crowd: 10431)
Saturday, 1 April	Perth 11.14 (80)	def. by	Claremont 17.16 (118)	Lathlain Park (crowd: 11160)
Monday, 3 April	South Fremantle 10.12 (72)	def. by	West Perth 11.11 (77)	Fremantle Oval (crowd: 11580)
Monday, 3 April	Subiaco 9.20 (74)	def. by	East Fremantle 17.9 (111)	Subiaco Oval (crowd: 10898)
The benefit of a tough game against Verdun Howell's former club is seen in a win that already has Claremont viewed the "team to beat" for the 1972 premiership – Perth, in contrast, had only played intra-club practice matches and appeared soft.; Subiaco's lack of class at centre half-forward and centre half-back leaves its attack inefficient, and allows big 1971 improver East Fremantle a comfortable victory – Old Easts were 61 points ahead at three-quarter time with only one more scoring shot.; West Perth gain a lucky last-minute victory over an opponent not expected to trouble them as Colin Beard's kick-in during the last seconds is taken away and kicked to unmarked Essendon recruit Ian Anderson who goals.

=== Round 2 ===
	Round 2
Saturday, 8 April	West Perth 16.11 (107)	def.	Subiaco 14.13 (97)	Leederville Oval (crowd: 10231)
Saturday, 8 April	Swan Districts 6.18 (54)	def. by	Perth 21.14 (140)	Bassendean Oval (crowd: 7341)
Saturday, 8 April	Claremont 12.22 (94)	def.	East Perth 8.10 (58)	Claremont Oval (crowd: 14466)
Saturday, 8 April	East Fremantle 6.21 (57)	def. by	South Fremantle 10.10 (70)	East Fremantle Oval (crowd: 13780)
South Fremantle produce the first real upset of 1972 against an inaccurate Old Easts who consistently fumble the ball in attack.; With an unfit Austin Robertson out of the game, West Perth, with an overweight Phil Smith kicking only two, are still able to hold off the Lions, who enter a crisis after the game.

=== Round 3 ===
	Round 3
Saturday, 15 April	Subiaco 15.11 (101)	def.	South Fremantle 11.14 (80)	Subiaco Oval (crowd: 9456)
Saturday, 15 April	Perth 11.19 (85)	def. by	East Perth 17.13 (115)	Lathlain Park (crowd: 10365)
Saturday, 15 April	Claremont 20.13 (133)	def.	Swan Districts 14.14 (98)	Claremont Oval (crowd: 7141)
Saturday, 15 April	West Perth 12.9 (81)	def. by	East Fremantle 13.21 (99)	Leederville Oval (crowd: 11522)
Champion fast bowler Dennis Lillee, himself an East Perth supporter, made the toss at Lathlain after being invited by the Demons.; Old Easts' finesse and fitness ensure they inflict the reigning premiers' first defeat (after two unimpressive victories) as the blue and whites' immaculate short game proves decisive.

=== Round 4 ===
	Round 4
Saturday, 22 April	Swan Districts 12.11 (83)	def. by	West Perth 22.12 (144)	Bassendean Oval (crowd: 7492)
Saturday, 22 April	South Fremantle 13.19 (97)	def. by	Perth 17.20 (122)	Fremantle Oval (crowd: 9157)
Saturday, 22 April	East Perth 19.15 (129)	def.	Subiaco 15.9 (99)	Perth Oval (crowd: 10432)
Saturday, 22 April	East Fremantle 11.10 (76)	def. by	Claremont 14.11 (95)	East Fremantle Oval (crowd: 13223)
A devastating second quarter burst ensures Claremont eliminate the challenge of Old Easts to confirm their early flag favoritism and stay undefeated.; Tactical blunders by new Swan Districts coach Jack Ensor ensure the winless Swans fade badly after being only ten points down at half-time. Ensor foolishly places his resting ruckman on the boundary and uses top half-forward Mark Foxon as a spare man in defence.

=== Round 5 ===
	Round 5
Saturday, 29 April	Subiaco 17.11 (113)	def. by	Swan Districts 19.18 (132)	Subiaco Oval (crowd: 5522)
Saturday, 29 April	West Perth 11.13 (79)	def. by	East Perth 15.13 (103)	Leederville Oval (crowd: 15185)
Saturday, 29 April	Claremont 14.16 (100)	def.	South Fremantle 13.14 (92)	Claremont Oval (crowd: 10031)
Saturday, 29 April	East Fremantle 13.16 (94)	def.	Perth 13.12 (90)	East Fremantle Oval (crowd: 9080)
An unorthodox shift of wingmen and half-backs gives Claremont a comeback victory after South Fremantle surprised them to be three goals up through almost all of the first half.; East Fremantle wilt completely after being forty-two points up at half-time and become lucky to hold on as Perth's tall men expose their lack of a specialist knock ruckman.

=== Round 6 ===
	Round 6
Saturday, 6 May	South Fremantle 11.13 (79)	def. by	East Perth 15.20 (110)	Fremantle Oval (crowd: 11084)
Saturday, 6 May	Perth 9.11 (65)	def. by	Subiaco 11.12 (78)	Lathlain Park (crowd: 7417)
Saturday, 6 May	West Perth 14.14 (98)	def.	Claremont 10.18 (78)	Leederville Oval (crowd: 14491)
Saturday, 6 May	Swan Districts 14.15 (99)	def. by	East Fremantle 20.17 (137)	Bassendean Oval (crowd: 6967)
Mal Brown's ability to ward off a painful injury proves decisive as South Fremantle again fade – this time after an impressive third-quarter revival.; A calf injury to Barry Cable, who had been in scintillating form, seemed to cause a reaction among the Perth players and Subiaco ran over them as Fitzpatrick completely dominated around the ground and in the ruck.

=== Round 7 ===
	Round 7
Saturday, 13 May	South Fremantle 10.14 (74)	def.	Swan Districts 8.11 (59)	Fremantle Oval (crowd: 5083)
Saturday, 13 May	Perth 10.19 (79)	def.	West Perth 6.7 (43)	Lathlain Park (crowd: 6682)
Saturday, 13 May	Subiaco 14.19 (103)	def. by	Claremont 16.24 (120)	Subiaco Oval (crowd: 7507)
Saturday, 13 May	East Perth 14.9 (93)	def. by	East Fremantle 16.19 (115)	Perth Oval (crowd: 8254)
Perth overcome a wayward start (nine unbroken behinds in the first quarter) in slippery conditions to show they are back as a force after a poor 1971. Rookie Geoff Watt silences Mel Whinnen and the Cardinals fail completely in attack.

=== Round 8 ===
	Round 8
Saturday, 20 May	West Perth 31.19 (205)	def.	South Fremantle 11.10 (76)	Leederville Oval (crowd: 10210)
Saturday, 20 May	Swan Districts 14.13 (97)	def.	East Perth 13.5 (83)	Bassendean Oval (crowd: 7352)
Saturday, 20 May	Claremont 17.13 (115)	def.	Perth 9.21 (75)	Claremont Oval (crowd: 11191)
Saturday, 20 May	East Fremantle 15.14 (104)	def. by	Subiaco 19.14 (128)	East Fremantle Oval (crowd: 8251)
West Perth equal their highest score of 30.25 (205) against Swan Districts from 1952, and beat by 62 points. their previous record in open-age competition against that team of 20.23 (143). It was the highest by any WANFL team since East Perth kicked one goal more against Claremont in 1958.; The Cardinals' 19.14 (128) remains their highest-ever second-half score, as South Fremantle, with only sixteen fit players, completely crumbled in defence. Phil Smith shows he is back in form with eight goals.; A change in leaping style by ruckman Bob Beecroft allows Swan Districts to cause a major upset as rovers Derek King and veteran Bill Walker become impossible to stop.; Subiaco's goal of reducing reliance upon Austin Robertson pays off as the club kick twelve goals in the first three quarters without "Ocker" scoring one – though he scores five in the final stanza and had missed several earlier – to gain an unexpected win.

=== Round 9 ===
	Round 9
Saturday, 27 May	Subiaco 6.12 (48)	def. by	West Perth 11.16 (82)	Subiaco Oval (crowd: 11143)
Saturday, 27 May	Perth 19.14 (128)	def.	Swan Districts 8.8 (56)	Lathlain Park (crowd: 8582)
Saturday, 27 May	East Perth 23.18 (156)	def.	Claremont 8.9 (57)	Perth Oval (crowd: 14739)
Saturday, 27 May	South Fremantle 24.7 (151)	def.	East Fremantle 14.10 (94)	Fremantle Oval (crowd: 9379)
East Perth make league leaders Claremont look "stricken by sleeping sickness" as returning ruckman Bradley Smith hands a hiding to young Tiger Graham Moss and the Royals have over 100 more possessions.; Barry Cable's courage in playing with a badly injured left ankle allows Perth's rovers to decimate Swan Districts in a tricky wind, by which many of the young Swans were baffled.; In an ill-tempered match South Fremantle show the imperative of attitude and determination, as they rebound from the West Perth debacle with a brilliant 14.3 (87) to 5.4 (34) first half helped by several freakish goals that luckily went through.

=== Round 10 (Foundation Day) ===
	Round 10
Saturday, 3 June	Swan Districts 14.8 (92)	def. by	Claremont 16.17 (113)	Bassendean Oval (crowd: 7984)
Saturday, 3 June	East Fremantle 11.11 (77)	def.	West Perth 10.9 (69)	East Fremantle Oval (crowd: 11312)
Monday, 5 June	South Fremantle 20.10 (130)	def.	Subiaco 16.18 (114)	Fremantle Oval (crowd: 11761)
Monday, 5 June	East Perth 17.15 (117)	def.	Perth 15.13 (103)	Perth Oval (crowd: 14666)

=== Round 11 ===
	Round 11
Saturday, 10 June	West Perth 18.9 (117)	def.	Swan Districts 16.7 (103)	Leederville Oval (crowd: 8320)
Saturday, 10 June	Perth 19.8 (122)	def.	South Fremantle 11.17 (83)	Lathlain Park (crowd: 10854)
Saturday, 10 June	Subiaco 14.12 (96)	def. by	East Perth 25.13 (163)	Subiaco Oval (crowd: 8288)
Saturday, 10 June	Claremont 24.23 (167)	def.	East Fremantle 12.18 (90)	Claremont Oval (crowd: 10717)
East Perth, with rookie Archie Duda kicking ten goals in place of state spearhead Phil Tierney, exploit the loose play of Subiaco for a crushing win.; Claremont's onslaught of 11.5 (71) was the best first-quarter score in the WANFL since 1958 and at the time the second-best on record.; The 1972 Perth Carnival meant no WANFL matches were scheduled for the following two weekends.

=== Round 12 ===
	Round 12
Saturday, 1 July	Swan Districts 14.14 (98)	def.	Subiaco 12.17 (89)	Bassendean Oval (crowd: 3224)
Saturday, 1 July	East Perth 15.15 (105)	def.	West Perth 4.9 (33)	Perth Oval (crowd: 8206)
Saturday, 1 July	South Fremantle 11.18 (84)	def. by	Claremont 16.14 (110)	Fremantle Oval (crowd: 6163)
Saturday, 1 July	Perth 13.14 (92)	def.	East Fremantle 11.10 (76)	Lathlain Park (crowd: 5559)
West Perth kick their lowest score against the Royals since the 1923 semi-final when they scored only 4.7 (31).; East Perth's incomparably greater team spirit compensated so well for deficiencies in their following division that West Perth kicked only 1.4 (10) after half-time whilst Tierney and Duda were able to combine well together in the rain.; Perth take Old Easts' place in the four via a display of spirit and skill compared by critics with their last quarter in the 1966 Grand Final. East Fremantle had taken the lead with the wind early in the last quarter before a melée seemed to put the blue and whites off their game.

=== Round 13 ===
	Round 13
Saturday, 8 July	East Perth 19.16 (130)	def.	South Fremantle 10.9 (69)	Perth Oval (crowd: 5860)
Saturday, 8 July	Subiaco 11.14 (80)	def. by	Perth 18.17 (125)	Subiaco Oval (crowd: 4720)
Saturday, 8 July	Claremont 15.16 (106)	def.	West Perth 8.8 (56)	Claremont Oval (crowd: 7811)
Saturday, 8 July	East Fremantle 9.10 (64)	def. by	Swan Districts 10.10 (70)	East Fremantle Oval (crowd: 4785)
An unusual policy of playing seven "followers" (Note: This policy was made illegal in 1973 when a "centre diamond" (later the current centre square) was introduced, within with no team could place more than four players during a centre bounce.) allows Claremont to completely control the rucks on a violently windy afternoon. Graham Moss, Peter Hines and John Evans shared ten goals resting in attack.; In blustery conditions, Swan Districts move away from a third straight wooden spoon by exposing East Fremantle's lack of spirit during a scrambly match where marks were rarities and 62 free kicks awarded.; Veteran Frank Pyke shows that five seasons away from the WANFL has not affected his skill as he combines with Cable to leave Subiaco a clear last.

=== Round 14 ===
	Round 14
Saturday, 15 July	Swan Districts 21.19 (145)	def.	South Fremantle 12.16 (88)	Bassendean Oval (crowd: 6861)
Saturday, 15 July	West Perth 12.12 (84)	def. by	Perth 16.11 (107)	Leederville Oval (crowd: 10318)
Saturday, 15 July	Claremont 17.8 (110)	def.	Subiaco 10.12 (72)	Claremont Oval (crowd: 7067)
Saturday, 15 July	East Fremantle 12.14 (86)	def. by	East Perth 17.18 (120)	East Fremantle Oval (crowd: 8420)

=== Round 15 ===
	Round 15
Saturday, 22 July	South Fremantle 7.10 (52)	def. by	West Perth 12.6 (78)	Fremantle Oval (crowd: 4920)
Saturday, 22 July	East Perth 15.8 (98)	def.	Swan Districts 11.8 (74)	Perth Oval (crowd: 9564)
Saturday, 22 July	Perth 16.20 (116)	def. by	Claremont 18.14 (122)	Lathlain Park (crowd: 11411)
Saturday, 22 July	Subiaco 17.15 (117)	def.	East Fremantle 16.12 (108)	Subiaco Oval (crowd: 4349)
A depleted Claremont with only eighteen fit players holds out Perth into the wind in torrential last-quarter rain. 6 feet 6 inches (198 cm) tall Keith Whyatt boots five from centre half forward. Perth played magnificently, but were handicapped by the conditions, though Ian Miller failed to get the distance with a kick on the siren that could have drawn the game.; Astute positional changes by captain-coach Peter Steward after half-time allow West Perth to hold South Fremantle to 0.1 (1) kicking with a strong wind during a crucial third quarter, whilst the Cardinals kicked 4.4 (28) themselves after being 17 points down at the long interval.; The heavy rain halts perennial wooden spooners Swan Districts' charge to threaten fourth: Swans fail to goal during eight minutes of attack in the final-quarter gloom, when goals could have seen them overwhelm East Perth. Mal Brown takes an amazing seventeen marks in totally unsuitable conditions.

=== Round 16 ===
	Round 16
Saturday, 29 July	West Perth 13.12 (90)	def. by	Subiaco 15.8 (98)	Leederville Oval (crowd: 6789)
Saturday, 29 July	Swan Districts 12.17 (89)	def. by	Perth 16.15 (111)	Bassendean Oval (crowd: 8187)
Saturday, 29 July	Claremont 17.17 (119)	def.	East Perth 10.13 (73)	Claremont Oval (crowd: 15576)
Saturday, 29 July	East Fremantle 22.17 (149)	def.	South Fremantle 14.19 (103)	East Fremantle Oval (crowd: 6823)
Claremont settle a score from their ninth-round thrashing with a superb win where Bruce Duperouzel and Bob Greenwood show East Perth's lack of class rovers – even when the two are injured the Royals cannot take advantage.; East Fremantle, in an angry mood after criticism of their earlier play, score 14.5 (89) to 2.8 (20) in 45 minutes to stand a game and 9.47 percent from fourth place after their recent losses seemed to have settled the finalists.

=== Round 17 ===
	Round 17
Saturday, 5 August	Subiaco 23.13 (151)	def.	South Fremantle 12.9 (81)	Subiaco Oval (crowd: 4018)
Saturday, 5 August	Perth 12.16 (88)	def. by	East Perth 14.11 (95)	Lathlain Park (crowd: 10833)
Saturday, 5 August	Claremont 15.9 (99)	def.	Swan Districts 6.9 (45)	Claremont Oval (crowd: 7299)
Saturday, 5 August	West Perth 9.14 (68)	def. by	East Fremantle 19.10 (124)	Leederville Oval (crowd: 8736)
The return of controversial coach Joyce to the playing field at full-forward revitalises East Fremantle's attack and leaves them merely 1.87 percent shy of fourth position, whilst centre half-back Eddie Donnes decimates West Perth's forward line.

=== Round 18 ===
	Round 18
Saturday, 12 August	Swan Districts 10.14 (74)	def.	West Perth 8.12 (60)	Bassendean Oval (crowd: 6442)
Saturday, 12 August	South Fremantle 14.27 (111)	def. by	Perth 19.10 (124)	Fremantle Oval (crowd: 4723)
Saturday, 12 August	East Perth 12.8 (80)	def. by	Subiaco 11.23 (89)	Perth Oval (crowd: 8174)
Saturday, 12 August	East Fremantle 12.12 (84)	def. by	Claremont 19.20 (134)	East Fremantle Oval (crowd: 11018)
Perth become the third WANFL club, after South Fremantle and Swan Districts, to win a match with twelve fewer scoring shots.; Subiaco, at the bottom for a number of weeks before the seventeenth round, gain a surprising chance of fourth position by beating a slow-paced East Perth team. The Royals were flattered by the Maroons' goalfront inaccuracy.; Claremont kick 6.5 (41) to nothing in the final twenty minutes after an Old East comeback has them nine points down. Wingman Vern Orr is electrifying and partner Tony Bovell less spectacular but equally effective.

=== Round 19 ===
	Round 19
Saturday, 19 August	Subiaco 11.22 (88)	def.	Swan Districts 7.20 (62)	Subiaco Oval (crowd: 5353)
Saturday, 19 August	West Perth 8.8 (56)	def. by	East Perth 16.8 (104)	Leederville Oval (crowd: 6051)
Saturday, 19 August	Claremont 16.23 (119)	def.	South Fremantle 9.7 (61)	Claremont Oval (crowd: 5345)
Saturday, 19 August	East Fremantle 13.8 (86)	def.	Perth 10.16 (76)	East Fremantle Oval (crowd: 6167)
The return of ruck-rover John Hayes and return to form of Hans Verstegen allows East Perth to shut out a disappointing West Perth attack and return East Fremantle to the four for the first time since 10 June.; With Bob Becu making a fine debut and Perth's attack extremely wasteful, East Fremantle take the box seat for a first semi-final berth despite a strong final quarter Demon comeback.

=== Round 20 ===
	Round 20
Saturday, 26 August	South Fremantle 19.27 (141)	def.	East Perth 16.10 (106)	Fremantle Oval (crowd: 4413)
Saturday, 26 August	Perth 15.16 (106)	def.	Subiaco 13.22 (100)	Lathlain Park (crowd: 8169)
Saturday, 26 August	West Perth 13.11 (89)	def.	Claremont 8.14 (62)	Leederville Oval (crowd: 7420)
Saturday, 26 August	Swan Districts 16.20 (116)	def.	East Fremantle 8.11 (59)	Bassendean Oval (crowd: 5413)
A rejuvenated West Perth, led by youngsters John Rainoldi, Terry Taylor, Ian Logan and Gary Smit, plays with the "exuberance" of Claremont to regain their place in the four. Between the seven-minute mark of the second quarter and the twenty-minute mark of the last the brilliant Cardinals score 9.5 (59) to 0.7 (7).; Subiaco's charge ends when they trail 4.15 (39) to 13.9 (87) late in the third quarter before young rovers Keith Watt and Chris Simpson reveal a lack of concentration amongst Demon players and nearly steal the game.

=== Round 21 ===
	Round 21
Saturday, 2 September	South Fremantle 23.17 (155)	def.	Swan Districts 10.9 (69)	Fremantle Oval (crowd: 5324)
Saturday, 2 September	Perth 14.8 (92)	def.	West Perth 13.6 (84)	Lathlain Park (crowd: 9567)
Saturday, 2 September	Subiaco 17.15 (117)	def. by	Claremont 18.16 (124)	Subiaco Oval (crowd: 8334)
Saturday, 2 September	East Perth 23.16 (154)	def.	East Fremantle 12.5 (77)	Perth Oval (crowd: 8873)
East Perth reveal their big-man power to dominate an East Fremantle team with a first semi-final berth to play for. Verstegen has 33 kicks on his twenty-third birthday, and East Fremantle's play was described as "insipid".; Key Tiger rover Bruce Duperouzel proves his fitness as Claremont wade off a strong challenge from a Subiaco team behind by forty or so points for most of the afternoon.

== Ladder ==
1972 WANFL ladder
Pos	Team	Pld	W	L	D	PF	PA	PP	Pts
1	Claremont	21	18	3	0	2295	1815	126.4	72
2	East Perth (P)	21	15	6	0	2356	1815	129.8	60
3	Perth	21	12	9	0	2126	1897	112.1	48
4	West Perth	21	9	12	0	1800	1839	97.9	36
5	East Fremantle	21	9	12	0	1967	2167	90.8	36
6	Subiaco	21	8	13	0	2052	2207	93.0	32
7	Swan Districts	21	7	14	0	1794	2257	79.5	28
8	South Fremantle	21	6	15	0	1949	2342	83.2	24

Rules for classification: 1) points; 2) percentage; 3) number of points for.
(P) Premiers

== Finals ==
=== First semi-final ===
	First semi-final
Saturday, 9 September	Perth 12.18 (90)	def.	West Perth 11.9 (75)	Subiaco Oval (crowd: 23,057)
Perth overcomes a slow start – not goalling in the initial forty minutes – and West Perth's greater pace to win well thanks to the Cardinals' wasteful use of their greater possession.

=== Second semi-final ===
	Second semi-final
Saturday, 16 September	Claremont 11.3 (69)	def. by	East Perth 12.14 (86)	Subiaco Oval (crowd: 24,119)
East Perth's ability to counter Claremont's anticipated roving superiority ensures they come home for a surprise win in showery and windy conditions. Dick Michalczyk at centre-half-back dominates the Claremont attack and shows the move of Ken McAullay to a flank was justified.

=== Preliminary final ===
	Preliminary final
Saturday, 23 September	Claremont 15.15 (105)	def.	Perth 10.14 (74)	Subiaco Oval (crowd: 23,556)
Claremont respond to coach Howell's overhaul due to their outplaying of the Demons' ruck division.

=== Grand Final ===
1972 WANFL Grand Final
Saturday, 30 September	East Perth	def.	Claremont	Subiaco Oval (crowd: 46,055)
1.3 (9); 5.8 (38); 8.12 (60); 9.17 (71)	Q1; Q2; Q3; Final	3.4 (22); 3.5 (23); 8.5 (53); 8.8 (56)	Umpires: John Fuhrmann; Simpson Medal: Ken McAullay (East Perth)
Bygraves 4, Verstegen, Whittle, Daniel, Brown, Armanasco	Goals	Crisp 2, Carroll 2, Orr, Greenwood, Evans, Hines
Verstegen, McAullay, Gillespie, Brown, Bygraves, Michalczyk	Best	Lewis, Griffiths, Parkinson, Crisp, Moss, Hines, Orr
Controversy over the possible replacement of Brown by Kevin Murray is overcome in a dour win in strong winds and rain based around solid teamwork and the strikepower of Gary Bygraves.
