= 1969 WANFL season =

Football League in Western Australia

- Teams: 8
- Premiers: West Perth; 13th premiership
- Minor premiers: East Perth; 12th minor premiership
- Sandover Medallist: Mal Brown (East Perth)
- Leading goalkicker: Austin Robertson, Jr. (Subiaco)

Attendance
- Matches played: 88
- Total attendance: 878,901 (9,988 per match)

The 1969 WANFL season was the 85th season of the Western Australian National Football League. It saw continued dominance by the three Perth clubs and Subiaco, who occupied the top half of the ladder constantly from the fourth round onwards, and finished four games clear of the other four clubs, who were all in a "rebuilding" mode with varying success – late in the season both Swan Districts and Claremont fielded some of the youngest teams in the competition's history, whilst the Tigers, who fielded thirteen first-year players including Graham Moss, Russell Reynolds and Bruce Duperouzel, began disastrously but four wins in five games paved the way to impressive record from 1970 to 1972. Among the top four, Perth failed to achieve a fourth consecutive premiership (Note: Four consecutive premiership in the WA(N)FL was last achieved by East Fremantle between 1928 and 1931, and the sole previous occurrences were by Old Easts between 1908 and 1911 and East Perth (five consecutive) between 1919 and 1923. No WANFL/WAFL/WASFL/Westar Rules club since 1970 has achieved four consecutive premierships.) that at one point looked very much in their grasp due to the overwork of Barry Cable which robbed him of some brilliance, early-season injuries to key players Iseger and Page and a couple of surprising losses to lower clubs, whilst East Perth, who won consistently without being impressive for most of the season, failed for the fourth time in as many seasons in the Grand Final, this time to West Perth and in a much more decisive manner than any of their Perth defeats.

The league's popularity, aided by the driest football season in Perth since 1940, and a new $500,000 grandstand at Subiaco Oval, reached a high not to be surpassed. East Perth attracted an average of over twelve thousand spectators to each home match, including an all-time record WANFL home-and-away attendance against West Perth on the Saturday before Foundation Day.

== Home-and-away season ==
=== Round 1 (Easter weekend) ===
	Round 1
Saturday, 5 April (2:15 pm)	Perth 18.20 (128)	def.	South Fremantle 11.14 (80)	Lathlain Park (crowd: 13060)
Saturday, 5 April (2:15 pm)	Swan Districts 15.13 (103)	def.	East Fremantle 14.17 (101)	Bassendean Oval (crowd: 9540)
Monday, 7 April (2:15 pm)	East Perth 21.23 (149)	def.	Subiaco 11.9 (75)	Perth Oval (crowd: 17838)
Monday, 7 April (2:15 pm)	Claremont 13.13 (91)	drew with	West Perth 13.13 (91)	Claremont Oval (crowd: 11236)
A devastating 10.5 (65) to 1.2 (8) last quarter, with rovers Doncon and Verstegen getting the ball from the centre every time, demolishes Subiaco after a fairly even three quarters and shows the Royals' eagerness to avenge their last three Grand Final defeats.; Claremont's John Lewis ties a fluctuating match – highlighted by a brilliant third quarter from John Parkinson – with the last kick of the day.; This was the first-ever draw at Claremont Oval in its fortieth season as a WA(N)FL venue. (Note: This includes the three wartime under-age seasons. Although Claremont joined the WAFL in 1926, they played at the Claremont Showgrounds in their inaugural season, and a major fire in July 1944, alongside another fire at the Showgrounds, meant the Tigers had to play at Subiaco Oval or the WACA in 1945, 1946 and 1947.) Only one draw – against Subiaco in 1987 – has occurred there since.

=== Round 2 ===
	Round 2
Saturday, 12 April (2:15 pm)	Perth 23.22 (160)	def.	Swan Districts 10.11 (71)	Lathlain Park (crowd: 10088)
Saturday, 12 April (2:15 pm)	West Perth 12.13 (85)	def. by	East Perth 12.22 (94)	Leederville Oval (crowd: 17414)
Saturday, 12 April (2:15 pm)	Subiaco 15.13 (103)	def.	Claremont 13.13 (91)	Subiaco Oval (crowd: 10093)
Saturday, 12 April (2:15 pm)	East Fremantle 16.17 (113)	def.	South Fremantle 13.16 (94)	East Fremantle Oval (crowd: 11285)
East Perth's ability to dominate Farmer ensures they defeat the depleted Cardinals more easily than the scoreboard implies – West Perth were flattered by eight final-quarter goals.

=== Round 3 ===
	Round 3
Saturday, 19 April (2:15 pm)	Swan Districts 8.15 (63)	def. by	West Perth 28.21 (189)	Bassendean Oval (crowd: 8555)
Saturday, 19 April (2:15 pm)	Subiaco 17.15 (117)	def.	South Fremantle 13.11 (89)	Subiaco Oval (crowd: 7654)
Saturday, 19 April (2:15 pm)	East Perth 14.16 (100)	def.	Perth 11.13 (79)	Perth Oval (crowd: 20466)
Saturday, 19 April (2:15 pm)	East Fremantle 19.12 (126)	def.	Claremont 16.16 (112)	East Fremantle Oval (crowd: 9411)
East Perth end Perth's longest-ever winning streak at fourteen and gain some revenge for their past three Grand Final defeats.; West Perth's 126-point win remains the biggest achieved by a visiting club at Bassendean Oval, breaking South Fremantle's 112 points in 1952. Laurie Richards scored 12.7 (79) and John Wynne produces the first of many dominating performances at centre half-forward.

=== Round 4 ===
	Round 4
Saturday, 26 April (2:15 pm)	West Perth 14.22 (106)	def.	Perth 13.16 (94)	Leederville Oval (crowd: 16884)
Saturday, 26 April (2:15 pm)	Swan Districts 15.18 (108)	def. by	East Perth 17.14 (116)	Bassendean Oval (crowd: 8261)
Saturday, 26 April (2:15 pm)	Claremont 16.14 (110)	def. by	South Fremantle 23.19 (157)	Claremont Oval (crowd: 9001)
Saturday, 26 April (2:15 pm)	East Fremantle 6.15 (51)	def. by	Subiaco 12.15 (87)	East Fremantle Oval (crowd: 10194)
Poor kicking denies Swan Districts a win – with newcomers Darryl Balchin and Neil Taylor overcoming their woeful 1968 knock ruck weakness – and leaves severe doubts about the undefeated Royals.; Perth's weakness around the ground – they take only 53 marks to 77 – leaves it unable to counter West and Barry Cable playing as a defensive man rather than a "stormtrooper".

=== Round 5 ===
	Round 5
Saturday, 3 May (2:15 pm)	Subiaco 8.10 (58)	def. by	West Perth 11.16 (82)	Subiaco Oval (crowd: 14612)
Saturday, 3 May (2:15 pm)	South Fremantle 19.19 (133)	def.	Swan Districts 11.18 (84)	Fremantle Oval (crowd: 10388)
Saturday, 3 May (2:15 pm)	East Perth 14.11 (95)	def.	Claremont 11.19 (85)	Perth Oval (crowd: 10757)
Saturday, 3 May (2:15 pm)	Perth 24.17 (161)	def.	East Fremantle 16.10 (106)	Lathlain Park (crowd: 8758)
David Dyson's superb display in holding Robertson to one goal (Note: Austin Robertson junior was held goalless on only five occasions in his 269 games in the WANFL and VFL (with South Melbourne in 1966). These occurred in 1962, 1963, 1965 and twice during his final 1974 season. He had not been held to one goal since his goalless Round 15, 1965 game with South Fremantle.) and Bill Valli's fine roving ensures Subiaco's hoodoo against the three top WANFL clubs is maintained in a dour match.; East Perth are again poor against a weak team, as their half-forward line consistently breaks down to create doubts about their ability to erase three grand final losses.

=== Round 6 ===
	Round 6
Saturday, 10 May (2:15 pm)	West Perth 15.14 (104)	def.	South Fremantle 9.9 (63)	Leederville Oval (crowd: 13964)
Saturday, 10 May (2:15 pm)	Perth 12.17 (89)	def. by	Subiaco 14.11 (95)	Lathlain Park (crowd: 9633)
Saturday, 10 May (2:15 pm)	Swan Districts 17.12 (114)	def.	Claremont 11.17 (83)	Bassendean Oval (crowd: 6385)
Saturday, 10 May (2:15 pm)	East Fremantle 12.12 (84)	def. by	East Perth 16.15 (111)	East Fremantle Oval (crowd: 8315)
Subiaco respond to criticism after their West Perth defeat by countering Perth's long-kicking game with Bunton's short-passing skill, producing their first win against a "Perth" club since 1967.; Winless Claremont captain-coach Dennis Marshall says he must start a rebuilding program after Swan Districts pass their 1968 win tally against a "selfish" Tiger team, where the youngsters teach lessons to Claremont's elders.

=== Round 7 ===
	Round 7
Saturday, 17 May (2:15 pm)	Subiaco 8.13 (61)	def. by	Swan Districts 9.10 (64)	Subiaco Oval (crowd: 6410)
Saturday, 17 May (2:15 pm)	South Fremantle 12.8 (80)	def. by	East Perth 14.20 (104)	Fremantle Oval (crowd: 9678)
Saturday, 17 May (2:15 pm)	Claremont 12.14 (86)	def. by	Perth 15.19 (109)	Claremont Oval (crowd: 5358)
Saturday, 17 May (2:15 pm)	West Perth 14.13 (97)	def.	East Fremantle 11.14 (80)	Leederville Oval (crowd: 7458)
Subiaco's desire to play dry-weather football on the first wet day of the season costs them dearly against the Swans, as they break down at half-forward until the second half and do not hang on after taking the lead.

=== Round 8 ===
	Round 8
Saturday, 24 May (2:15 pm)	South Fremantle 11.9 (75)	def. by	Perth 17.17 (119)	Fremantle Oval (crowd: 10439)
Saturday, 24 May (2:15 pm)	Subiaco 15.13 (103)	def. by	East Perth 15.18 (108)	Subiaco Oval (crowd: 14052)
Saturday, 24 May (2:15 pm)	West Perth 18.18 (126)	def.	Claremont 7.8 (50)	Leederville Oval (crowd: 10665)
Saturday, 24 May (2:15 pm)	East Fremantle 21.21 (147)	def.	Swan Districts 7.16 (58)	East Fremantle Oval (crowd: 8051)
Subiaco fail to take the game from the unbeaten Royals in the final minutes after scoring the only four goals of the last quarter.; East Fremantle kick their highest score since 1966 to stand a game from fourth as "Whale" Roberts monopolises the ruck, nullifying Swans' main strength in Walker. After Bill Holmes score 1.6 (12) in the first half, East Fremantle score 13.9 (87) to 3.6 (24).

=== Round 9 (Foundation Day) ===
	Round 9
Saturday, 31 May (2:15 pm)	Swan Districts 7.17 (59)	def. by	Perth 18.12 (120)	Bassendean Oval (crowd: 7711)
Saturday, 31 May (2:15 pm)	East Perth 12.11 (83)	def. by	West Perth 16.15 (111)	Perth Oval (crowd: 26760)
Monday, 2 June (2:15 pm)	Claremont 13.9 (87)	def. by	Subiaco 27.18 (180)	Claremont Oval (crowd: 9392)
Monday, 2 June (2:15 pm)	South Fremantle 15.17 (107)	def.	East Fremantle 13.17 (95)	Fremantle Oval (crowd: 16548)
The Perth Oval crowd between the two fierce rivals is the biggest WANFL home-and-away crowd ever, beating the 1949 South Fremantle v West Perth record by almost two thousand. The huge crowd causes much congestion with 100 yards (90 m) queues at the gates.; West Perth end the Royals' unbeaten run by holding them scoreless in the last quarter, as John Wynne shows himself the WANFL's best centre half-forward again by kicking two goals and controlling play against a Royal side minus injury-plagued number one rover Doncon.; Subiaco kicked its highest open-age score until 1984 when it kicked 32.12 (204) against Perth, and still its highest against Claremont. The Maroons had seventy more kicks, fifty-nine more marks and an amazing seventy-seven effective handballs to just sixteen.

=== Round 10 ===
	Round 10
Saturday, 7 June (2:15 pm)	West Perth 15.13 (103)	def.	Swan Districts 10.10 (70)	Leederville Oval (crowd: 6271)
Saturday, 7 June (2:15 pm)	Perth 8.19 (67)	def.	East Perth 6.8 (44)	Lathlain Park (crowd: 9700)
Saturday, 14 June (2:15 pm)	South Fremantle 10.12 (72)	def. by	Subiaco 11.15 (81)	Fremantle Oval (crowd: 8459)
Saturday, 14 June (2:15 pm)	Claremont 14.11 (95)	def. by	East Fremantle 15.18 (108)	Claremont Oval (crowd: 5185)
Perth easily win an uninspiring match between two depleted teams – it was said most spectators were eagerly listening on the radio to the Adelaide Carnival!; East Fremantle keep Claremont winless with a comeback from 38 points down at half-time, scoring 10.13 (73) to 3.4 (22) owing to the dominance of Fred Lewis in his first match for over a year at centre half-forward. It is the biggest comeback in the second half ever at Claremont Oval.

=== Round 11 ===
	Round 11
Saturday, 21 June (2:15 pm)	Perth 18.8 (116)	def.	West Perth 9.20 (74)	Lathlain Park (crowd: 14940)
Saturday, 21 June (2:15 pm)	East Perth 21.23 (149)	def.	Swan Districts 12.13 (85)	Perth Oval (crowd: 7879)
Saturday, 21 June (2:15 pm)	South Fremantle 14.18 (102)	def. by	Claremont 17.11 (113)	Fremantle Oval (crowd: 6617)
Saturday, 21 June (2:15 pm)	Subiaco 19.14 (128)	def.	East Fremantle 17.16 (118)	Subiaco Oval (crowd: 7921)
Against the eventual premiers, Perth beat Claremont's 1940 record for the biggest win with fewer scoring shots. After West Perth score six behinds from seven shots in the first ten minutes of the last quarter, Perth score 8.1 (49) to two behinds in the final twenty minutes.; Claremont, after its worst start to a season since 1958 and third-worst winless start in its history, finally win its first match since 17 August 1968 against a South Fremantle team that cannot match the determination of the inexperienced Tigers.; In a match affected at a critical stage by a dog entering the playing field when Robertson was shooting for goal, Subiaco held off Old Easts to have the finalists virtually sealed with ten rounds remaining.; The dog followed play for two minutes in the last quarter, in the process spreadeagling Bunton of Subiaco and Allen Prosser of East Fremantle. The field umpire was criticised for not halting play since it was clear there was much distraction with the game close.

=== Round 12 ===
	Round 12
Saturday, 28 June (2:15 pm)	West Perth 14.13 (97)	def.	Subiaco 8.20 (68)	Leederville Oval (crowd: 11097)
Saturday, 28 June (2:15 pm)	Swan Districts 13.22 (100)	def. by	South Fremantle 17.8 (110)	Bassendean Oval (crowd: 4439)
Saturday, 28 June (2:15 pm)	Claremont 9.12 (66)	def. by	East Perth 14.19 (103)	Claremont Oval (crowd: 6666)
Saturday, 28 June (2:15 pm)	East Fremantle 11.16 (82)	def. by	Perth 19.10 (124)	East Fremantle Oval (crowd: 7047)
Subiaco's short game and Robertson's weakness in "one-out" contests means the Maroons are cut to ribbons after a goalless first quarter, as West Perth's speed yields 11.7 (73) to 3.10 (28) in the second and third stanzas.; The switching of centre-half-forward Ian Miller and full-forward Richard Peel drives Perth to a brilliant final quarter of 11.3 (69) with Miller scoring five as Perth's disposal to him reaches remarkable levels of precision.

=== Round 13 ===
	Round 13
Saturday, 5 July (2:15 pm)	South Fremantle 9.12 (66)	def. by	West Perth 15.12 (102)	Fremantle Oval (crowd: 8302)
Saturday, 5 July (2:15 pm)	Subiaco 16.6 (102)	def.	Perth 12.14 (86)	Subiaco Oval (crowd: 10362)
Saturday, 5 July (2:15 pm)	Claremont 12.15 (87)	def. by	Swan Districts 16.18 (114)	Claremont Oval (crowd: 5701)
Saturday, 5 July (2:15 pm)	East Perth 20.8 (128)	def.	East Fremantle 12.18 (90)	Perth Oval (crowd: 9398)
Bill Walker, despite suffering a bad back injury early in the match, constantly brings the ball into the open to have Swans running over Claremont after the Tigers obtained a four-goal quarter-time lead.

=== Round 14 ===
	Round 14
Saturday, 12 July (2:15 pm)	Swan Districts 21.10 (136)	def.	Subiaco 10.13 (73)	Bassendean Oval (crowd: 7435)
Saturday, 12 July (2:15 pm)	East Perth 16.15 (111)	def.	South Fremantle 12.7 (79)	Perth Oval (crowd: 8277)
Saturday, 12 July (2:15 pm)	Perth 24.22 (166)	def.	Claremont 12.10 (82)	Lathlain Park (crowd: 6121)
Saturday, 12 July (2:15 pm)	East Fremantle 11.11 (77)	def.	West Perth 11.8 (74)	East Fremantle Oval (crowd: 7655)
East Fremantle come from six goals behind at half-time for a surprise victory over the powerful Cardinals – Eric Sarich's complete reorganisation blots out the centreline dominance of Whinnen that had previous strangled Old Easts' forwards.; Ruck-rover Tony Nesbit and centreman Peter Manning show brilliant form to deal a shattering blow to Subiaco's chances of playing in their first open-age second semi-final since 1935. (Note: Subiaco did play in the 1943 second-semi when league football was restricted to players under nineteen years of age as of 1 October that year.) Despite their weak ruck, Swans' drop kicking to Nesbit is deadly accurate and he consistently found Manning playing on and moving forward.

=== Round 15 ===
	Round 15
Saturday, 19 July (2:15 pm)	South Fremantle 14.10 (94)	def. by	Perth 20.16 (136)	Fremantle Oval (crowd: 5405)
Saturday, 19 July (2:15 pm)	East Perth 22.10 (142)	def.	Subiaco 16.12 (108)	Perth Oval (crowd: 7822)
Saturday, 19 July (2:15 pm)	Claremont 9.12 (66)	def. by	West Perth 15.10 (100)	Claremont Oval (crowd: 5240)
Saturday, 19 July (2:15 pm)	Swan Districts 17.25 (127)	def.	East Fremantle 12.18 (90)	Bassendean Oval (crowd: 9576)
Swan Districts move to fifth by kicking 7.9 (51) to 2.4 (16) into a fading wind in the final quarter, as Old Easts' backline degenerates into a "shamble."

=== Round 16 ===
	Round 16
Saturday, 26 July (2:15 pm)	Perth 14.20 (104)	def.	Swan Districts 12.6 (78)	Lathlain Park (crowd: 8568)
Saturday, 26 July (2:15 pm)	West Perth 10.10 (70)	drew with	East Perth 9.16 (70)	Leederville Oval (crowd: 11424)
Saturday, 26 July (2:15 pm)	Subiaco 11.9 (75)	def.	Claremont 8.20 (68)	Subiaco Oval (crowd: 3779)
Saturday, 26 July (2:15 pm)	East Fremantle 9.15 (69)	def.	South Fremantle 7.10 (52)	East Fremantle Oval (crowd: 4899)
The draw with West Perth, on one of only two wet Saturdays all year, was East Perth's last until the third round of 1993, a 518-game gap that became the most by any WA(N)FL team until beaten by East Fremantle in 2014. It also produced the last season until 2009 with multiple drawn matches.; In a match where only 1.4 (10) was scored into a violent wind, East Perth's determination allows it to hold the Cardinals for the thrilling final eight minutes after Farmer had led them to equalise earlier in the final quarter.; By positioning Cable on a half-back flank as an extra defender, Perth score 2.4 (16) to 2.0 (12) into an almost hurricane-force wind to take second position, as Cable's eleven last-quarter possessions are all moved precisely to running teammates.; Subiaco full-back Peter Easkins' constant strong marking in the goalmouth forces Claremont into errors and wide play on its forward line in a strong crosswind and means the Tigers fail to capitalise upon a dominant midfield.

=== Round 17 ===
	Round 17
Saturday, 2 August (2:15 pm)	Swan Districts 9.10 (64)	def. by	West Perth 14.19 (103)	Bassendean Oval (crowd: 6341)
Saturday, 2 August (2:15 pm)	South Fremantle 11.12 (78)	def. by	Subiaco 15.12 (102)	Fremantle Oval (crowd: 4758)
Saturday, 2 August (2:15 pm)	East Perth 8.12 (60)	def. by	Perth 12.12 (84)	Perth Oval (crowd: 13053)
Saturday, 2 August (2:15 pm)	Claremont 14.16 (100)	def.	East Fremantle 8.19 (67)	Claremont Oval (crowd: 3840)
Perth again shows themselves the best-equipped WANFL team for wars of attrition as they overcome East Perth in a hard, tough games after the Royals came within ten points midway through the last quarter.

=== Round 18 ===
	Round 18
Saturday, 9 August (2:15 pm)	West Perth 14.16 (100)	def. by	Perth 16.6 (102)	Leederville Oval (crowd: 19117)
Saturday, 9 August (2:15 pm)	Swan Districts 9.10 (64)	def. by	East Perth 24.18 (162)	Bassendean Oval (crowd: 7280)
Saturday, 9 August (2:15 pm)	Claremont 17.18 (120)	def.	South Fremantle 10.10 (70)	Claremont Oval (crowd: 5025)
Saturday, 9 August (2:15 pm)	East Fremantle 17.16 (118)	def.	Subiaco 17.6 (108)	East Fremantle Oval (crowd: 5955)
Minus Atwell, Graham Jenzen and Greg Brehaut, Perth's fanaticism has them snatch the match from West Perth after being thirty-one points down at half-time – giving the Demons the box seat for four consecutive premierships.

=== Round 19 ===
	Round 19
Saturday, 16 August (2:15 pm)	Subiaco 16.6 (102)	def.	West Perth 12.14 (86)	Subiaco Oval (crowd: 11746)
Saturday, 16 August (2:15 pm)	South Fremantle 17.14 (116)	def.	Swan Districts 14.25 (109)	Fremantle Oval (crowd: 4535)
Saturday, 16 August (2:15 pm)	East Perth 16.16 (112)	def.	Claremont 10.8 (68)	Perth Oval (crowd: 8635)
Saturday, 16 August (2:15 pm)	Perth 12.14 (86)	def. by	East Fremantle 18.17 (125)	Lathlain Park (crowd: 7201)
Subiaco's elimination of needless short play and Robertson's eleven goals has the Maroons surprisingly winning the expected first semi-final preview.; East Fremantle gain revenge for the 1967 Lathlain Park debacle and record their first win over Perth since 1966, breaking a record sequence of eight losses.

=== Round 20 ===
	Round 20
Saturday, 23 August (2:15 pm)	West Perth 19.27 (141)	def.	South Fremantle 4.6 (30)	Leederville Oval (crowd: 7000)
Saturday, 23 August (2:15 pm)	Perth 18.18 (126)	def.	Subiaco 10.7 (67)	Lathlain Park (crowd: 12004)
Saturday, 23 August (2:15 pm)	Swan Districts 14.9 (93)	def. by	Claremont 17.11 (113)	Bassendean Oval (crowd: 4576)
Saturday, 23 August (2:15 pm)	East Fremantle 10.14 (74)	def. by	East Perth 16.11 (107)	East Fremantle Oval (crowd: 8811)
Perth's hardness at the ball allows them to score 9.6 (60) to 1.2 (8) in a brilliant last quarter after an even struggle – in the process keeping ahead of West Perth's despite the latter's huge win over an inept South Fremantle.

=== Round 21 ===
	Round 21
Saturday, 30 August (2:15 pm)	Subiaco 18.15 (123)	def.	Swan Districts 10.15 (75)	Subiaco Oval (crowd: 6642)
Saturday, 30 August (2:15 pm)	East Perth 30.11 (191)	def.	South Fremantle 9.10 (64)	Perth Oval (crowd: 7006)
Saturday, 30 August (2:15 pm)	Claremont 16.15 (111)	def.	Perth 10.11 (71)	Claremont Oval (crowd: 6773)
Saturday, 30 August (2:15 pm)	East Fremantle 10.6 (66)	def. by	West Perth 12.19 (91)	East Fremantle Oval (crowd: 8200)
Claremont win their fourth match out of five to avoid the wooden spoon and deprive Perth of the double chance. Their young ruck division of Moss, McIntosh (in his last match before shifting to St. Kilda) "Boomer" Harvey and Reynolds crushes the Demons at ball-ups and around the ground.; South Fremantle suffer their fourth wooden spoon of the 1960s as they lose consecutive matches by over 100 points for the only time in open-age football. The injury-plagued Keith Doncon returns from a severe back injury to kick five goals, whilst Grand Dorrington scores 9.0 (54) and Phil Tierney on a half-forward flank 6.5 (41).

== Ladder ==
1969 WANFL ladder
Pos	Team	Pld	W	L	D	PF	PA	PP	Pts
1	East Perth	21	17	3	1	2339	1729	135.3	70
2	West Perth (P)	21	14	5	2	2132	1573	135.5	60
3	Perth	21	15	6	0	2327	1797	129.5	60
4	Subiaco	21	12	9	0	2016	2012	100.2	48
5	East Fremantle	21	8	13	0	1987	2150	92.4	32
6	Swan Districts	21	6	15	0	1839	2443	75.3	24
7	Claremont	21	5	15	1	1884	2282	82.6	22
8	South Fremantle	21	5	16	0	1811	2349	77.1	20

Rules for classification: 1) points; 2) percentage; 3) number of points for.
(P) Premiers

== Finals ==
=== First semi-final ===
	First semi-final
Saturday, 6 September (2:15 pm)	Perth 13.17 (95)	def.	Subiaco 12.15 (87)	Subiaco Oval (crowd: 32,574)
After Subiaco led 5.2 (32) to 1.3 (9) into the wind with Robert Kitchin compensating for Ramshaw's eclipse of Robertson, Cable and Graham Jenzen lead Perth to a fine win as the Maroons' excessive handball in defence costs them dearly.

=== Second semi-final ===
	Second semi-final
Saturday, 13 September (2:15 pm)	East Perth 7.15 (57)	def. by	West Perth 12.11 (83)	Subiaco Oval (crowd: 35,740)
West Perth's unexpected physical strength jolts and undisciplined East Perth team, who made the error of kicking into the wind after winning the toss.; The use of former ruckman Bryan Pleitner on a wing exposed East Perth's lack of size there, and Keith Doncon again suffered a season-ending injury, this time a major knee strain during the second quarter.

=== Preliminary final ===
	Preliminary final
Saturday, 20 September (2:15 pm)	East Perth 19.8 (122)	def.	Perth 9.22 (76)	Subiaco Oval (crowd: 29,590)
East Perth break Perth's Round 11 record for the biggest win with fewer scoring shots and derail Perth's dream of four successive premierships.; The Royals' policy of using seven ruckmen and rotating all in the forward line exploits the Demons' ruck weakness and ensures East Perth a fourth chance at the premiership

=== Grand Final ===
1969 WANFL Grand Final
Saturday, 27 September	West Perth	def.	East Perth	Subiaco Oval (crowd: 51,385)
6.12 (48); 10.14 (74); 18.19 (127); 21.21 (147)	Q1; Q2; Q3; Final	2.2 (14); 4.5 (29); 4.6 (30); 10.14 (74)	Umpires: Ray Montgomery; Simpson Medal: Bill Dempsey (West Perth)
Richards 7, Smeath 6, Miller 2, Wynne 2, Watling, Baker, Knell, Valli	Goals	Dorrington 3, Bygraves 3, Smith, Tierney, Verstegen
Dempsey, Knell, Watling, Whinnen, Farmer, Richards, Smeath	Best	Bygraves, Gillespie, Brown, Smith, Graham, Haines, Chadwick, Gillespie
Under the captain-coaching of former Royal "Polly" Farmer, West Perth win their first premiership since 1960 in brilliant fashion, setting records for highest Grand Final score and biggest win, which they broke in 1975.
