= Brian France (footballer) =

Australian rules footballer (born 1939)

Personal information
- Full name: Brian Leslie France
- Nickname: Puffer
- Born: 9 July 1939 (age 87)
- Original team: Mount Hawthorn
- Height: 183 cm (6 ft 0 in)
- Weight: 86 kg (190 lb)
- Position: Centre half-back

Playing career
Years	Club	Games (Goals)
1958–1967	West Perth	157 (2)

Representative team honours
Years	Team	Games (Goals)
1962–1967	Western Australia	9 (0)

Career highlights
- West Perth premiership team: 1960; West Perth best and fairest: 1963; Third-place Sandover Medal: 1966; Runner-up Sandover Medal: 1967; West Perth Team of the Century: 2000; West Australian Football Hall of Fame: 2007

Brian Leslie France (born 9 July 1939) is a former Australian rules footballer who played for the West Perth Football Club in the Western Australian National Football League (WANFL) between 1958 and 1967. He was inducted in to the West Australian Football Hall of Fame in 2007, and is a member of the West Perth Team of the Century.

== Biography ==
France was recruited by West Perth from Mount Hawthorn. He made his debut in round one of the 1959 season, aged 19. Standing 183 centimetres (6 ft 0 in) and weighing 86 kilograms (190 lb), France quickly established himself in the West Perth line-up, winning a premiership in his second season as the Cardinals defeated archrivals East Perth by 32 points in the grand final. A bullocking centre half-back, he twice won the Breckler Medal as West Perth's best and fairest, in 1963 and 1965.

France made his state debut in August 1962, against South Australia at Subiaco Oval. He would play nine state games in total, including four in the 1966 Australian National Football Carnival in Hobart. In the 1966 WANFL season, France polled 18 Sandover Medal votes to finish third overall, just behind Bill Walker (20 votes) and Barry Cable (19 votes). He was in stellar form early the following year, but in round fourteen suffered a career-ending knee injury and never played again. Despite this he still polled 18 Sandover votes, finishing runner-up behind equal winners Bill Walker and John Parkinson.
