= Bill Dempsey =

Australian rules footballer (1942–2026)

Bill Dempsey MBE

Personal information
- Full name: William Brian Dempsey
- Born: 17 March 1942; Birdum, Northern Territory, Australia
- Died: 15 March 2026 (aged 83)
- Positions: Ruckman, back pocket

Playing career
Years	Club	Games (Goals)
1960–1976	West Perth	341 (89)
1959–1969	Darwin (NTFL)	145

Representative team honours
Years	Team	Games (Goals)
1963–1973	Western Australia	14 (0)

Career highlights
- Darwin premiership side 1958–59, 1959–60, 1967–68^{[a]}; Darwin captain 1964–65; West Perth best and fairest 1966; West Perth premiership side 1969, 1971, 1975; Simpson Medal 1969 (grand final); West Perth Team of the Century (2000); West Australian Football Hall of Fame (2004); Indigenous Team of the Century (2005); AFL Northern Territory Hall of Fame (2010); Australian Football League Hall of Fame Inductee

William Brian Dempsey (17 March 1942 – 15 March 2026) was an Australian rules footballer who played for the Darwin Football Club in the Northern Territory Football League (NTFL) and the West Perth Football Club in the Western Australian National Football League (WANFL). Dempsey was an inductee of the Australian Football, AFL Northern Territory and the West Australian Football Halls of Fame. Dempsey's 341 premiership games for West Perth is second only to Mel Whinnen's 367 as a club and WAFL record.

== Biography ==
An indigenous Australian born in Birdum, a railway settlement in the Northern Territory of Australia, Dempsey began his career with the Buffaloes Football Club^{[b]} in the Northern Territory Football League. He played in premiership sides with the club in 1958–59 and 1959–60^{[a]} before being recruited by West Perth in the WANFL. Dempsey made his WANFL debut in 1960. Playing either as a ruckman or resting in defence – late in 1967 Bob Spargo used him successfully as a substitute for Brian France at centre half-back after the latter suffered a career-ending knee injury – Dempsey became a regular in the West Perth side, winning the Breckler Medal as the club's best and fairest in 1966 and playing in premierships in 1969 and 1971. During most summers, Dempsey returned to play in the NTFL, where he captained Darwin during the 1964–65 season and was a member of their unbeaten premiership side during the 1967–68 season; he played 145 games for Darwin. Dempsey made his debut for Western Australia in an interstate match against Tasmania at Subiaco Oval in June 1963, and went on to play 14 matches for the state, including two matches at the 1972 Australian Championships. Dempsey played 341 premiership games and two pre-season/night series games for West Perth before retiring at the end of the 1976 season.

Dempsey was made a Member of the Order of the British Empire (MBE) in June 1976, for "services to sport", along with teammate Mel Whinnen. In October 2000, he was named in a back pocket in West Perth's Team of the Century. He was an inaugural inductee of the West Australian Football Hall of Fame in March 2004, and in 2010, Dempsey was named as a "Legend" in the inaugural induction into the AFL Northern Territory Hall of Fame. Dempsey was named as a back pocket in the Indigenous Team of the Century in 2005. One of the entrance gates at Patersons Stadium is named after Dempsey, and a stand at Arena Joondalup, West Perth's home ground since 1994, is named the Whinnen–Dempsey Stand in honour of the two players' contribution to the club. Dempsey's grandson, Malcolm Rosas Jr, is an AFL player for the Sydney Swans.

Dempsey died on 15 March 2026, aged 83.

== Notes ==
^{1} The Northern Territory Football League season is played during the wet season in the Northern Territory, which usually occurs between December and March. Hence, NTFL seasons are usually written to encompass two years e.g. the 1959–60 season refers to the season played between December 1959 and March 1960.
^{2} Buffaloes changed its name to the Darwin Football Club for the 1962–63 season, having previously been known as Warriors (1917–18) and Vesteys (1918–26).
