= Dick Michalczyk =

Australian rules footballer (born 1950)

Personal information
- Full name: Richard Michalczyk
- Born: 5 November 1950 (age 75)
- Original team: Narembeen
- Height: 191 cm (6 ft 3 in)
- Weight: 91 kg (201 lb)
- Position: Defender

Playing career^{1}
Years	Club	Games (Goals)
1969–1972	East Perth	67 (54)
1973–1975	North Melbourne	24 (3)
- ^{1} Playing statistics correct to the end of 1975.

Career highlights
- 1972 East Perth premiership player

Richard Michalczyk (born 5 November 1950) is a former Australian rules footballer who played with North Melbourne in the Victorian Football League (VFL) and East Perth in the Western Australian National Football League (WANFL).

== Football career ==
=== WANFL ===
Michalczyk, who was originally from Narembeen, debuted at East Perth halfway through the 1969 WANFL season.

He was a member of East Perth's 1972 premiership team. After a dominant performance at centre half-back in the second semi-final, Michalczyk was one of East Perth's best in their 15-point grand final win over Claremont.

The first of three brothers to play for East Perth, his younger brothers Eddie and George also played for the club.

=== VFL ===
Michalczyk spent the first half of 1973 with West Adelaide, though was unable to get a clearance from East Perth. North Melbourne agreed on a deal reported to be worth $30,000 and he was cleared by East Perth in June 1973. He made his debut against Richmond in round 14 but was only on the field for two minutes before suffering a hamstring injury which ended his season.

He injured his hamstring again during pre-season training in 1974. Michalczyk was sent by the club to the Lewisham Hospital in Sydney for a complete medical check up and he was there for a week receiving treatment. On return to North Melbourne he was able to train without any soreness and, after being cleared by doctors, was selected in the side for round 11. He managed to put together eight successive VFL games that year.

In the 1975 season he appeared in the first three rounds, then was out of the side for two months. He returned in round 12 and played in all of the remaining 11 games of the home and away season. In the qualifying final win over Carlton, Michalczyk played as a half-back for North Melbourne and was one of the side's best with 18 disposals, but had to be replaced at three-quarter time with a knee injury. Initially it was thought he had injured his groin and he was moved into the forward line and it was only after he kicked a goal that he was forced from the ground. The diagnosis was a strained medial ligament, which ruled him out of the rest of the finals series, opening up a spot in the team for Doug Wade. He had to undergo a serious knee operation at the end of the season, followed by another in 1976, and was unable to make it back to VFL football.

== Personal life ==
Michalczyk is an uncle of former West Coast Eagles player Dean Cox. His sister Mary is Dean's mother.
