= John Parkinson (footballer) =

Australian rules footballer (1944–2025)

Personal information
- Full name: John Rodney Parkinson
- Nickname: Buzz
- Born: 7 November 1944; Nedlands, Western Australia, Australia
- Died: 25 August 2025 (aged 80); Claremont, Western Australia, Australia
- Original team: Scotch College
- Height: 179 cm (5 ft 10 in)
- Weight: 79 kg (174 lb)

Playing career
Years	Club	Games (Goals)
1963–70, 1972–73	Claremont	156 (238)
1971	Collingwood	3 (1)

John Rodney Parkinson (7 November 1944 – 25 August 2025) was an Australian rules footballer who played with Claremont in the West Australian National Football League (WANFL) and Collingwood in the Victorian Football League (VFL).

== Biography ==
A rover, Parkinson made his debut for Claremont in 1963. He was a premiership player in 1964 and in 1967 won both a Sandover Medal and best and fairest award. During his time at Claremont he also topped their goal kicking on three occasions.

With a lot of interest coming from Victorian clubs, Parkinson joined VFL side Collingwood in 1971 and played three games that year before suffering a broken collarbone. While recovering from that injury he suffered groin and ankle concerns, then to the surprise of the club he stepped away from the game mid year. After only one season he returned to Western Australia.

Parkinson finished his career at Claremont, rejoining them in 1972 and retiring at the end of the 1973 season having played 156 WANFL games.

Having lived most of his life in the Claremont area, Parkinson ran to become a councillor on the Town of Claremont in 2021, but was not elected.

Parkinson died in Claremont on 25 August 2025, at the age of 80.
