= Keith Doncon =

Australian rules footballer

Personal information
- Full name: Keith Doncon
- Born: 11 July 1944 (age 82)
- Original team: Scotch College
- Position: Rover

Playing career^{1}
Years	Club	Games (Goals)
1963, 1965–70	East Perth	75 (136)
- ^{1} Playing statistics correct to the end of 1970.

Keith Doncon (born 11 July 1944) is a former Australian rules footballer who played for East Perth in the WANFL during the 1960s.

Doncon first played with East Perth in 1963 after having played his early football at Scotch College but returned to his country home the following season due to homesickness. He made his way back to the club in 1965 and had a good career before injuries received in a farm accident near Wickepin, followed by others to his knee upon his return at the end of 1969, forced him into retirement at the age of just 25 after only a few games in 1970.

A rover, he averaged nearly two goals a game as he was handy around goals when he rested in the forward pockets, especially as despite his slight physique Doncon was an outstanding overhead mark. He made six interstate appearances and kicked thirteen goals for Western Australia, forming the most potent roving combination in interstate football with Barry Cable and Bill Walker. His performances at the 1966 Hobart Carnival saw him selected in the All-Australian team.

He was named as a forward in East Perth’s official ‘Team of the Century 1945 to 2005’.
