= Mel Whinnen =

Australian rules footballer (born 1942)

Mel Whinnen MBE

Personal information
- Full name: Allan Melvyn Whinnen
- Nickname: Slippery
- Born: 6 October 1942 (age 84); Perth, Western Australia
- Original team: Perth Boys High School
- Position: Centre

Playing career^{1}
Years	Club	Games (Goals)
1960–77	West Perth	371 {70) (Note: These tallies refer to premiership matches (home-and-away and finals matches) only.)

Representative team honours
Years	Team	Games (Goals)
1963–72	Western Australia	14 (1)
- ^{1} Playing statistics correct to the end of 1977.

Career highlights
- West Perth premiership side 1960, 1969, 1971, 1975; West Perth best and fairest 1962, 1964, 1967-1968 1970-1973, 1975; Runner-up Sandover Medal 1964, 1971; Simpson Medal 1975 (grand final); West Perth captain 1977; West Perth Team of the Century (2000); West Australian Football Hall of Fame (2004); Most Played WAFL Games

Allan Melvyn Whinnen MBE (born 6 October 1942) is a former Australian rules footballer who played for the West Perth Football Club in the Western Australian National Football League (WANFL) from 1960 to 1977. Whinnen played 367 premiership games for West Perth, a WAFL record, playing in four premiership sides and finishing runner-up in the Sandover Medal on two occasions, as well as winning West Perth's best and fairest award, the Breckler Medal, on a record nine occasions.

He was inducted into the West Australian Football Hall of Fame in 2004, and elevated to 'legend status' in 2023.

== Career ==
Educated at North Perth Primary School and Perth Boys High School, Whinnen debuted for West Perth in 1960 and was a reserve in the club's 1960 premiership win over East Perth at Subiaco Oval. Playing mainly as a centreman, Whinnen established himself in West Perth's league team, winning the Breckler Medal in 1962 and 1964 as the club's best and fairest. He also finished second in the Sandover Medal in 1964, polling 22 votes to finish one vote behind Barry Cable, the winner. Whinnen made his state debut for Western Australia against the Victorian Football Association (VFA) in 1963. Whinnen won West Perth's best and fairest award in both 1967 and 1968, and again in 1970, 1971, 1972, 1973 and 1975. In total, Whinnen won the Breckler Medal a record nine times between 1962 and 1975.

Whinnen again played in premierships in 1969, 1971 and 1975. In 1975, he was awarded the Simpson Medal as the best on ground in West Perth's premiership defeat of South Fremantle. Whinnen was appointed as captain of West Perth for the 1977 season and retired at the end of the year.

Whinnen's 367 career premiership matches are both a West Perth club record and a WAFL record as of 2022. Whinnen also played 14 interstate and carnival football matches for Western Australia, and four night series matches for West Perth which are considered senior by the WAFL, for a total of 385 senior career games.

== Honours and awards ==
Whinnen was made a Member of the Order of the British Empire (MBE) in June 1976, for "services to sport", along with former teammate Bill Dempsey. In October 2000, he was named in the centre in West Perth's Team of the Century. Whinnen was an inaugural inductee of the West Australian Football Hall of Fame in March 2004. One of the entrance gates at Subiaco Oval is named after Whinnen, and a grandstand at Arena Joondalup, West Perth's home ground since 1994, is named the Whinnen–Dempsey Stand in honour of the two players' contribution to the club. Since 1998, the Mel Whinnen Medal has been awarded to the player judged best on ground in the grand final of the WAFL's colts (under-19) competition. Notable winners have included Paul Hasleby, Scott Stevens, Jacob Surjan and Matthew Leuenberger.
