= South Fremantle Football Club Hall of Fame =

Football Club Hall of Fame

The South Fremantle Football Club Hall of Fame was established in 2011 to recognise and enshrine individuals who have made an outstanding contribution to the club's history. In opening the club's Hall of Fame, then club president Hayden Raitt gave the following address:

South Fremantle’s illustrious football history is one littered with many outstanding events, feats of champion footballers, champion teams and selfless dedication by committed coaches, officials and administrators. All have kept our great club at the forefront of football in Western Australia for over a century.

The first intake, held at a club dinner function on 21 July 2011, focused on the contributions of players, coaches, officials and administrators across the first 80 years of the club's history. Subsequent intakes to the Hall of Fame have been held in 2015 and 2021.

There are currently 88 members in the South Fremantle Hall of Fame. In this article, they are divided into three broad categories: Legends, Players and Officials.

- Members with names in **bold** are also in the Western Australian Football Hall of Fame
- Members with an asterisk * next to their names are also in the Australian Football Hall of Fame

== Legends ==
Name	Inducted	Career span	SFFC games (goals)	Description
Brian Ciccotosto	2011	1967–1978	212 (312)	Elevated to Legend status in 2021. A Bulldog through and through, 'Cicco' was a champion rover who served the club over many years as player, coach and administrator. His most notable on-field achievements include winning the Simpson Medal in South's drought-breaking 1970 premiership, earning All-Australian selection in 1972 and captaining the club from 1975 to 1977. As a coach, he guided the Colts team to premierships in 1984 and 1985 before an administrative stint that included the roles of Football Development officer, General Manager and CEO until 2012.
**Frank Jenkins**	2011	1937–1949	150 (102)	Elevated to Legend status in 2015. Regarded as a somewhat dour and unspectacular but effective footballer, 'Scranno' Jenkins was an essential cog in the Bulldogs' success in the immediate post-WW2 era. Burst onto the scene with the Sandover in his debut season (1937) and finished runner-up in 1938 to Haydn Bunton Sr., as well as winning the AW Walker Medal in his first three seasons. He served as captain for part of 1946 and played in both the 1947 and 1948 premierships. Represented Western Australia in interstate football nine times, winning the Simpson Medal in 1947 for his efforts against Victoria.
**Clive Lewington**	2011	1939−1941, 1946–1951, 1953	182 (53)	Elevated to Legend status in 2015. One of the finest centremen of his era, Lewington's career was interrupted by service in World War 2. In the post-war period he established his reputation as one of the game's greats, enjoying special seasons in 1947, when he won his third AW Walker Medal, the Sandover Medal and was part of the premiership team, and in 1950 as premiership captain-coach and winner of the Simpson Medal as best on ground in the Grand final. Guided South to a further three flags as non-playing coach.
**Bernie Naylor** *	2011	1941, 1946−1954	194 (1034)	Elevated to Legend status in 2015. Kicked six goals on debut, and after missing four years due to war service made up for lost time by kicking over 100 goals in a season five times, benefiting from the superb midfield led by Lewington and Marsh. Holds the WAFL record for most goals in a season (167) and most goals in a match (23), 12 of which were kicked in one quarter. Unlike his high-flying successor Gerovich, Naylor relied on the fast lead and mark, and kicked using the torpedo punt with an unorthodox grip. A member of six premiership sides, the WAFL award for leading goalkicker at the end of the home-and-away rounds is named after him.
Frank Treasure	2011	1942−1957	254	Premiership Captain; 1947, 1948, 1950, 1952, 1953, 1954 Premierships
**Steve Marsh** *	2011	1945–1956	226 (418)	How Marsh joined South is one of the great stories of WA football. Originally destined for rivals East Fremantle, Marsh was invited to the South change rooms at the time both clubs shared Fremantle Oval (the East change rooms were locked), and the rest is history. One of the greatest-ever rovers in WA football, Marsh played in six Bulldog premierships, won the Sandover in 1952 and the Simpson in 1953 as best on ground in the Grand final, and represented WA 19 times, captaining the state in 1954. Quick off the mark, elusive, courageous, an excellent reader of the play and a master of the drop kick and stab pass, he eventually crossed over to the Sharks in 1957 and captain-coached them to a long-awaited premiership that same year.
John Todd	2011	1955−1966	132	1955 Sandover Medal, 1955, 58, 61 Fairest & Bests; 1997 premiership coach
John Gerovich	2011	1955–1969	221	11-time club leading goalkicker; 3-time WAFL leading goalkicker
**Stephen Michael** *	2011	1975–1985	243	1977, 1978, 1979, 1981, 1983 Fairest & Bests; 1980, 1981 Sandover Medals; 1983 Simpson Medal; 1980 premiership, 1983 Tassie Medal
Tony Parentich	2011	1952–1959, 1961	162 (27)	Elevated to Legend status in 2021. Blessed with pace, skill and poise, Parentich was a worthy successor to Clive Lewington in the centreman position for the Bulldogs, playing a key role in the 1952 premiership win in his debut season and also starring in the 1953 and 1954 triumphs. He was awarded the 1956 Simpson Medal as best on ground in the Grand final loss to East Perth. Equally adept on the wing or half-forward flank, Parentich won the AW Walker Medal in 1957 and also represented Western Australia eight times in interstate football.

== Players ==
Name	Inducted	Career span	SFFC games (goals)	Achievements	Description
Harry Hodge	2011	1900–1909	100	Club's first 100-game player; Secretary 1902; Treasurer 1902−1906	
Johnny Campbell	2011	1916–1929	167	1926 Fairest & best	
**Sol Lawn**	2011	1925–1932	123	7-time club leading goalkicker, 2-time WAFL leading goalkicker	
Jack Rocchi	2011	1926−1929	63	1928 Sandover Medal; 1928 & 1929 Fairest & best	
Ron Doig	2011	1927–1932	99	Captain; 1932 Captain/Coach	
Neil Lewington	2011	1936–1945	140	1936 Fairest & best	
Jack 'Corp' Reilly	2011	1937–1951	204	1945 Fairest & best; 1947, 1948 & 1950 premierships	
Dave Ingraham	2011	1940–1951	135	1947 Simpson Medal; 1948 Fairest & Best; 1947, 1948 & 1950 premierships	
Eric Eriksson	2011	1942–1954	210	1947 Simpson Medal; 1947, 1948, 1950, 1952 & 1953 premierships	
Norm Smith	2011	1942−1957	129	1950, 1952, 1953 & 1954 premierships	
Harry Carbon	2011	1945−1952	141	1947, 1950 & 1952 premierships	
Len Crabbe	2011	1946−1953	140	1948 & 1952 premierships	
Charlie Tyson	2011	1948−1955, 1961	152	1954 Fairest & best; 1954 Simpson Medal; 1948, 1950, 1952, 1953 & 1954 premierships	
Laurie Green	2011	1948−1954	99	1949 Fairest & best; 1948, 1950 & 1953 premierships	
Des Kelly	2011	1949−1954	102	1952 Simpson Medal; 1950, 1952, 1953 & 1954 premierships	
John Colgan	2011	1951−1961	220	1953 & 1954 premierships	
Cliff Hillier	2011	1951−1960	160	1959 Fairest & Best; 1952, 1953 & 1954 premierships	
Ray Richards	2011	1951−1958	147	1952 & 1954 premierships	
Tony Parentich	2011	1952−1961	162	1956 Simpson Medal; 1957 Fairest & best; 1952, 1953 & 1954 premierships	
Barry White	2011	1952−1961	160	1952, 1953 & 1954 premierships	
Gary Scott	2011	1957−1969	255	1964 Fairest & best	
**Tom Grljusich**	2011	1960–1964, 1968–1976	258 (126)	1970 premiership; 1968 & 1972 Fairest & best; 1968 leading goalkicker	Although not allowed to play club football until he was 18, Grljusich proved to be a natural. He was already very strong and fit due to the physically demanding work in the family market garden business, and quickly developed the skill level required for League football, especially his high marking and handpassing. After three impressive seasons showing he could hold down key positions in attack and defence, Grljusich joined new SANFL club Central Districts and gave outstanding service, becoming one of a handful of players to represent WA and SA in interstate football. He returned to South in 1968 and tasted premiership success in 1970, and eventually retired, albeit reluctantly, at the end of 1976 as the club's games record holder.
Joe McKay	2011	1974–1982	169	1976 Fairest & best; 1980 premiership	
**Maurice Rioli** *	2011	1975–1981, 1988–1990	168 (133)	1980 premiership; 1988−1989 captain; 1981 & 1983 Simpson Medal	One of indigenous football's great trailblazers, Rioli came to South from Melville Island to join older brother Sebastian, and quickly earned a reputation as one of the finest footballers of his era. Tough and skilled in equal measure, he won the Simpson Medal three times, twice for his Grand Final performances in 1980 and 1981, and once for WA in 1983. He then went to VFL powerhouse Richmond in 1982, winning the Jack Dyer Medal and the Norm Smith Medal that season. He returned to South in 1988 and was captain for two seasons.
Noel Carter	2011	1978–1985	155 (318)	1979−1982, 1985 Captain; 1980 premiership captain; 1980 Fairest and best	Originally from NWFU club Ulverstone in Tasmania, Carter first joined VFL powerhouse Richmond in 1973 as an 18-year-old and was a premiership player in only his fifth game, but after struggling to play regularly at senior level, he came to Souths and quickly earned a reputation as one of the most inspirational on-field leaders in the game. A talented rover, Carter combined skill and creativity (his kicking with either foot and reading of the game were superb), with toughness and tenacity to captain the Bulldogs in three consecutive Grand finals, and was among the club's best players in all of them.
**Brad Hardie** *	2011	1979–1984, 1993	140 (300)	1980 premiership; 1984 captain; 1984 & 1993 leading goalkicker; 1984 & 1986 Tassie Medal; 1984 Simpson Medal	A chunky redhead who played in long sleeves to hide burns suffered in a horrific backyard accident when he was 15, Hardie would be a senior WAFL premiership player just two years later, kicking three goals in the 58-point win. Blessed with all the skills and ability to read play, Hardie excelled in interstate football, twice winning the Simpson Medal and also the Tassie Medal in 1986. He went to Footscray in the VFL and won the Brownlow Medal playing as an attacking back pocket, but after falling out with coach Mick Malthouse became part of the inaugural Brisbane Bears team, becoming the first player to reach 100 games. Returned to South for one final season in 1993 and kicked 52 goals before embarking on a media career.
Norm McIntosh	2015	1910−1919	133	1916 & 1917 premierships; 1916 captain; 1929 & 1933 coach	
Frank Collins	2015	1912−1919	115	1916–1919 captain ; 1916 & 1917 premiership captain	
Jerry Sunderland	2015	1918−1928	139	1926 & 1928 captain-coach	
Ron Edgar	2015	1924−1936	173	3-time Fairest and best; 1934−1935 captain-coach	
Cyril Jennings	2015	1924−1937	178	1931 Fairest and best	
George White	2015	1928−1939	183	1936−1937 captain	
Percy Renfrey	2015	1936−1948	126	1947 premiership; Champion Team 1946−1976	
Don Wares	2015	1945−1951	107	1947, 1948 & 1950 premierships; Vice-President 1968	
Jack Murray	2015	1946−1953	98	1947, 1948, 1952 & 1953 premierships; Colts Coach 1958−1959	
Bob Mason	2015	1947−1952	121	1947, 1948 & 1950 premierships	
Alby Western	2015	1947−1951	102	1947, 1948 & 1950 premierships	
Don Dixon	2015	1948−1957	134	1950, 1952, 1953 & 1954 premierships	
Don Byfield	2015	1950−1963	239	1953 & 1954 premierships; Vice-Captain 1959, Committee member 1972−1973	
Colin Beard	2015	1959−1967, 1972	168	1966 Fairest and best; 1974−1976 league coach	
Fred Seinor	2015	1961−1974	219	1970 premiership; 1968, 1973–1974 Captain ; 1973 Fairest and best	
Don Haddow	2015	1969−1980	168	1970 & 1980 premierships; 1982 & 1983 colts premiership coach ; 1984 reserves coach ; 1985–86 league coach	
Stan Magro	2015	1970–1976	105 (69)	1987−1990 league coach; 1975 Simpson Medal	An outstanding schoolboy footballer, Magro made his senior WANFL debut at 15 and won the Simpson Medal in 1975 for his performance against Victoria. Made up for lack of pace and polish with fearsome competitiveness and all-out commitment. One of few who could hold their heads in the Bulldogs' Grand final thrashing that same year, he eventually went to VFL powerhouse Collingwood in 1977, where he became a cult figure and cemented his reputation as one of the game's hard men, famously shirtfronting Carlton captain-coach Alex Jesaulenko in 1979. Returned to South as coach in 1987.
Tony Morley	2015	1971−1981	200	1980 premiership; 1978 captain	
Rod Barrett	2015	1975−1984	195	1980 premiership; 1983−1984 vice-captain	
Basil Campbell	2015	1975−1981	102	1980 premiership	
Benny Vigona	2015	1977−1986	165	1980 premiership	
Jon Dorotich	2015	1981−1997	151	1997 premiership co-captain; 2-time Bernie Naylor Medal; 3-time Leading Goalkicker; 1997 Simpson Medal	
Wally Matera	2015	1982−1994	142	3-time Fairest and best; 1993−1994 captain	
Brad Collard	2015	1984−1995	202	1991 Fairest and best; 1987, 1990–1991 captain; Director 2010−2013	
Craig Edwards	2015	1984−1992	163	2-time Fairest and best; 2-time leading goalkicker; 1989 Sandover Medal	
Marty Atkins	2021	1989−2003	266	1997 premiership; 2000−2003 Captain; 1993 Simpson Medal; General Manager Football and Community 2020−	
Brad Bootsma	2021	1994−2005	165	1998 & 1999 Fairest and best; 1997 premiership; 2004 captain	
Tom Bottrell	2021	1992−2003	200	1997 premiership; CEO 2017−2019	
Toby McGrath	2021	1998−2012	234	2004 & 2008 Fairest and best; 2005 & 2009 premiership; 2009 premiership captain; 2008-10 captain ; 2005 Sandover Medal; 2005 Simpson Medal	
John Porter	2021	1990−1999	190	1996 Fairest and best; 1997 premiership	
Peter Sumich	2021	1986−1998	112	1997 premiership; 1998 co-captain; 1988 leading goalkicker	
Peter Worsfold	2021	1987−1999	155	1997 premiership co-captain; 1995−1999 captain	

== Officials ==
Name	Playing career	Games for SFFC	Achievements with SFFC	Year inducted
Griff John			Club co-founder 1900	2011
Joe Coates	1904−1908	43	Committee 1910–1911; Head Trainer 1913; Coach 1913−1919 (1916, 17 Premiership coach); Secretary 1916−1919	2011
Jack Polinelli			Administrator between 1916 and 1966	2011
Frank Fuhrmann	1924−1931	114	Administrator between 1947 and 1960	2011
Bill Hughes	1925−1927	46	Administrator between 1929 and 1971	2011
Bill Collins	1926−1933	88	Administrator between 1938 and 1966	2011
Frank Harrison			Administrator between 1929 and 1969	2011
Tom Bottrell Sr.			Trainer 47 years; Head Trainer 27 years	2011
Ron Greer			Administrator between 1955 and 2011	2011
Dr Dick Reid			Club doctor for 33 years	2011
Bev Morris			Secretary 1925–1928, 42; Treasurer for 28 years; League delegate; Life Member	2015
Don Gillan			Trainer 1933–1942, 1958–1966; Head Trainer 1943–1950; Committee Member 1945−1945	2015
Claude Law			Assistant Secretary 1936–1942, 1945–1950; Secretary 1943–1944; Committee Member 1950–1957; Vice-President 1959, 1962–1967; League delegate 1962−1967	2015
Tom Goldie			Trainer 1948–50; Head Trainer 1951−1957	2015
Dr Ernie Hodder			Club Doctor 1961−1981	2015
Joe Maffina			Secretary/Manager 1962–1967; Donation Bonanza organiser 1990−1992	2015
Richard Woodgate	1964	2	Treasurer 1969–1971, 1977–1981; Director 1982–1985; Vice-President 1986−1991	2015
Chris Martinovich			Club Chiropractor 1965−2011	2015
Terry Dean			Management Committee 1981; Director 1986–1991, 2009; Vice-President 1992–1995; President 1996−2008	2015
Ron Porter			Propertyman 1987−2011	2015
source: South Fremantle Football Club 2016 Yearbook, page 19

== See also ==
- Western Australian Football Hall of Fame
