= Fremantle Football Hall of Legends =

The Fremantle Football Hall of Legends was inaugurated by the Fremantle Football Club in 1995, in recognition of the new Australian Football League team's links with its home city's football heritage. The inductees are nominated by the two clubs from the Fremantle area in the West Australian Football League: East Fremantle and South Fremantle. In time, players who represented Fremantle in the AFL will join their predecessors in this prestigious Hall.

== 1995 ==
- Jack Clarke (East Fremantle) 232 games 1952 - 1962. Sandover Medal 1957.
- George Doig (EF) 202 games 1933 - 1945. 1,111 goals; AFL Hall of Fame 2002; WA Football Hall of Fame Legend 2004.
- Stephen Michael (South Fremantle) 260 games 1975 - 1985. Sandover Medal 1980, 1981.
- Clive Lewington (SF) 188 games 1939 - 1951; SF coach 1950–58. Sandover Medal 1947.
- Steve Marsh (SF, EF) 281 games 1945 - 1960; EF coach 1957 - 58. Sandover Medal 1952; WA Football Hall of Fame Legend 2005.
- Jack Sheedy (EF, East Perth, South Melbourne) 363 games 1942 - 1963; EF coach 1949, 1952, EP coach 1956 - 62, 1969; WA Football Hall of Fame Legend 2005.

== 1996 ==
- William 'Nipper' Truscott (Mines Rovers, EF) 400 games (est.) 1906 - 1927; Perth coach 1934–35; WA Football Hall of Fame Legend 2004.
- Brian Peake (EF, Geelong, Perth) 402 games 1972 - 1990. Sandover Medal 1977.
- John Todd (SF) 141 games 1955 - 1966; SF coach 1959, 1966–1968, 1995–1998, EF coach 1973–76, Swan Districts coach 1977–87, 1990–94, 2000 - 200I, West Coast coach 1988–89. Sandover Medal 1955; WA Football Hall of Fame Legend 2004.
- Bernie Naylor (SF) 209 games 1941 - 1954. 1,162 goals.

== 1997 ==
- Con Regan (EF) 261 games 1953 - 1965
- John Gerovich (SF) 221 games 1955 - 1969. 721 goals.
- Frank Treasure (SF) 254 games 1942 - 1957
- George Prince (EF) 231 games 1939 - 1952

== 1998 ==
- Frank Jenkins (SF) 150 games 1937 - 1949. Sandover Medal 1937.
- Jim Conway (EF) 180 games 1943 - 1956. EF coach 1951; Claremont coach. Sandover Medal 1950.
- Brian Ciccotosto (SF) 211 games 1967 - 1978.
- Doug Green (EF, South Melbourne and WA) 180 games 1970 - 1981.

== 1999 ==
- Tom Grljusich (SF, Central Districts) 258 games.
- Carlisle Jarvis (EF) EF coach; WA coach 1934.

== 2000 ==
- Maurice Rioli (SF, Richmond) 168 games; Norm Smith Medal 1982.
- Jerry Dolan (EF and East Perth) EF coach; EP coach.
- The broadcaster George Grljusich was inducted as an honorary member of the Hall of Legends in 1999, the same year as his brother Tom.

== Team ==
In 2001, the Fremantle Football Club yearbook put the inducted 22 players into a team, a team which would compete with any other Team of the Century named from any competition. A captain and coach were not selected, as it was too difficult to choose.

Fremantle Football Hall of Legends Team
B:	Frank Jenkins (South Fremantle)	Con Regan (East Fremantle)	Tom Grljusich (South Fremantle)
HB:	Frank Treasure (South Fremantle)	Carlisle 'Bub' Jarvis (East Fremantle)	Doug Green (East Fremantle)
C:	Maurice Rioli (South Fremantle)	Clive Lewington (South Fremantle)	Nipper Truscott (East Fremantle)
HF:	Jack Sheedy (East Fremantle)	George Prince (East Fremantle)	Brian Peake (East Fremantle)
F:	George Doig (East Fremantle)	Bernie Naylor (South Fremantle)	John Todd (footballer) (South Fremantle)
Foll:	Jack Clarke (East Fremantle)	Stephen Michael (South Fremantle)	Steve Marsh (South & East Fremantle)
Int:	John Gerovich (South Fremantle)	Brian Ciccotosto (South Fremantle)	Jim Conway (East Fremantle)
Int:	Jerry Dolan (East Fremantle)		
