= Christian Brothers College, Fremantle =

School in Fremantle, Western Australia

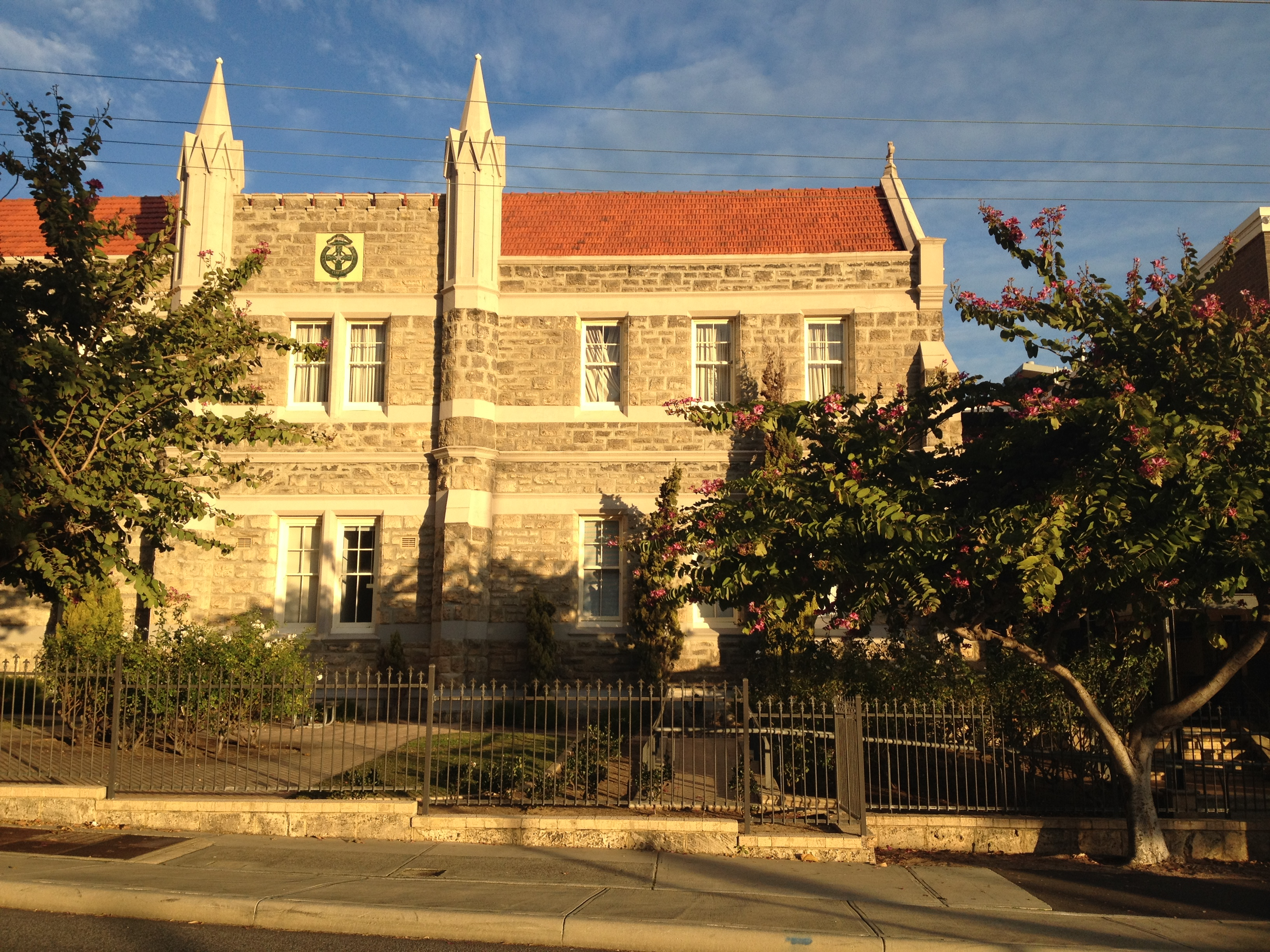
- The façade of Christian Brothers College Fremantle, as viewed from Ellen Street

Location
- Fremantle, Western Australia; Australia; 32°3′6″S 115°45′10″E

Information
- Other name: CBC Fremantle
- Type: Independent secondary school
- Motto: Latin: Palma Virtuti (Goodness is its own reward)
- Religious affiliation: Catholicism
- Denomination: Congregation of Christian Brothers
- Established: 1901; 125 years ago
- Principal: Domenic Burgio
- Years offered: 7–12
- Gender: Boys
- Enrolment: c. 800
- Colours: Green and gold
- Website: www.cbcfremantle.wa.edu.au

Western Australia Heritage Register
- Type: State Registered Place
- Designated: 8 November 2016
- Reference no.: 898

Christian Brothers College Fremantle is an Independent Catholic secondary school for young men, located in Ellen Street site, in the coastal community surrounding Fremantle, Western Australia. The school traces its origins back to 1882, and in 1901 management responsibility was assigned to members of the religious order of the Christian Brothers. Teaching students in the tradition of Edmund Rice, the college caters for day students from Years 7 to 12, however in the past it was technically all ages.

Christian Brothers College (CBC) is associated with Edmund Rice Education Australia (EREA) and has been a member of the Associated & Catholic Colleges of Western Australia (ACC) since its inception in 1937.

The college does not have an official sister school, but maintains good relations with both Iona Presentation College located in Mosman Park and Santa Maria College in Attadale.

== History ==
The school's first building was opened in 1882 on High Street in the port town of Fremantle under the name Fremantle Catholic Boys' School in a building still standing on school grounds, which is now Blessed Edmund Chapel and used for College Liturgies and Masses. This building was constructed because the original school had outgrown St Patrick's Presbytery. The single story building was designed by a former Fenian convict, Joseph Nunan, an architect by profession who drew up the plans for the new school, and it was built using limestone. The foundation stone of Blessed Edmund Chapel was laid on 26 January 1882. The new school commenced with an enrolment of thirty primary-aged boys under the management of Otto De Grancy. It opened on 14 November 1883.

A change in the colony's Education Act in 1895 meant that all financial support for church-based schools was withdrawn. The recently arrived religious order of Christian Brothers was invited to take over the running of the parish school, and to establish a high school for the education of boys in the Fremantle area. In January 1901, the first group of brothers took charge of what was then known as St. Patrick's Boys' School. Thirty boys were enrolled but this number soon grew to ninety within four weeks. Soon afterwards, the High School opened with an enrolment of twenty-nine which soon rose to fifty-seven by the end of the year.

From 1901 to 1913, Christian Brothers' College Fremantle was one of half-a-dozen schools in Western Australia preparing students for public examinations for the University of Adelaide until the University of Western Australia opened in 1914 with two brother and two former CBC students among the first graduates. In the last twenty years the school has become staffed by predominantly lay teachers, with 2002 seeing the appointment of the schools' first lay Principal, David McFadden. The years that followed saw CBC Fremantle undergo radical changes including the addition of a large gymnasium, new science labs, manual arts area, the renovation of the library, a new administration building and refurbishment of other key areas of the campus.

In October 2007, Edmund Rice Education Australia (EREA) took responsibility for the governance of CBC Fremantle along with forty other Edmund Rice schools, including Aquinas College and Trinity College.

=== Previous headmasters ===
Name	Year(s) served
J. Morgan, CFC	1901–1903
B. Hanrahan, CFC	1904–1906
D. O'Donoghue, CFC	1907–1909
B. Doyle, CFC	1910–1915
A. Ryan, CFC	1916–1917
L Brennan, CFC	1918–1920
P Joyce, CFC	1921–1923
B Jordan, CFC	1924–1926
L Mackey, CFC	1927–1932
L Duffy, CFC	1933–1937
A Doody, CFC	1938–1940
A O'Connor, CFC	1941–1946
P O'Connor, CFC	1947
S Quilligan, CFC	1948–1950
D Callopy, CFC	1951–1953
A. Kelly, CFC	1954–1959
T. Marshall, CFC	1960–1965
P St John, CFC	1966–1970
D Drake, CFC	1971–1974
P Faulkner, CFC	1975–1980
K McMaster, CFC	1981
P. Kelly, CFC	1982–1990
Alan J. Wedd, CFC	1992–2002
D. McFadden	2002–2006
R. Henderson	2007–2010
Shaun Kenny	2011–2017
Domenic Burgio	2018–present

== House system ==
Like many other Australian schools CBC students are allocated to a house system, overseen by the head of house. Each of the six houses is named after a significant figure in the school community.

House name	Colours	Named Origin
Kelly	Sky blue	Patrick Kelly was a headmaster of the college and a firm supporter of the CBC community; died in 2016.
Morgan	Red	Joseph Morgan was the school's first principal.
O'Connor	Purple	Charles Yelverton O'Connor originally hailed from Ireland and was responsible for the construction of Fremantle Harbour.
Patrick	Bottle green	Prior to 1901, the present college site was the site of the 'Catholic Boys' new school, now known as St. Patrick's.
Rice	Gold	Edmund Ignatius Rice was the founder of the order of Christian Brothers.
Samson	Royal blue	Frederick Samson, an early student at the college, became mayor of Fremantle. His family owned the Heritage-registered Samson House, which is situated on Ellen Street along with the college.

== Campus ==
The school is located in the heart of Fremantle. One of the oldest schools in Western Australia, the property on Ellen Street houses the junior and senior school, and overlooks Fremantle Park. The college has three heritage listed buildings including the administration building in which the Christian Brothers once lived.

== Co-curriculum ==
=== Sport ===
CBC Fremantle has been involved in the ACC Swimming, Athletics and Cross-County carnivals since its inception. Annually the interschool swimming team represent the college in the Quad Meet competing against Aquinas College, Hale School and Guildford Grammar School in preparation for the ACC "A" Division Carnival. Recent success includes winning the overall boys' shield at the ACC "A" Division Swimming, Cross Country and Athletics Carnivals.

=== CBC Fremantle Amateur Football Club ===
The CBC Old Boys Association fields 7 teams each Saturday to play against various other football clubs in the Western Australian Amateur Football League (WAAFL). The club was founded in 1932. It won the A Grade, A Reserves and A Colts Premiership treble in 2000 as well as grand final appearances in 2001, 2002 and 2003.

=== Arts ===
The arts department hosts a jazz orchestra, guitar ensembles, rock band and various other stage and concert bands throughout the different year groups.

== Notable alumni ==
- Tony Barber OAM – television presenter, radio announcer & singer
- Lachlan Blakiston- AFL player
- Martin Cattalini – NBL player Perth Wildcats, Adelaide 36ers
- Brian Ciccotosto – WAFL football player
- Cory Dell'Olio – AFL footballer Essendon Football Club
- Cameron Edwards – soccer player Reading F.C. and Perth Glory player.
- Ryan Edwards – soccer player at Reading F.C. and Perth Glory player
- John Gerovich – WAFL football player immortalised in the bronze sculpture outside Fremantle Oval
- Oliver Goss – Professional golfer
- George Grljusich – football commentator
- Tom Grljusich – WAFL football player
- John Hughes – Perth businessman
- Stephen Jurica – AFL footballer Richmond Football Club; Barrister
- Jim McGinty – MLA for Fremantle; Attorney General
- Sam Menegola – AFL footballer Geelong Football Club
- J. J. Miller – champion jockey and horse trainer
- David Neesham – Olympic water polo player
- Gerard Neesham – WAFL & VFL football player and inaugural Fremantle Football Club coach
- Con Regan – WAFL football player
- Frederick Samson – Mayor of Fremantle, 1951–1972
- Jacob Surjan – AFL footballer Port Adelaide Football Club
- Peter Tagliaferri – Mayor of Fremantle, 2001–2009
