= West Australian Football Hall of Fame =

The West Australian Football Hall of Fame was created in 2002 to recognise significant contributors to Australian rules football in Western Australia. Candidates are players, coaches, umpires, administrators and media representatives.

The inductees are chosen under guidelines established by the West Australian Football Commission, and a Hall of Fame Selection Committee established in 2003. The first induction into the Hall of Fame took place on 21 March 2004.

== 2004 ==
80 inductees:

- Ron Alexander
- Malcolm Atwell
- Ken Bagley
- Bill Bateman
- Reg Brentnall
- Mal Brown
- Dick Buchanan (Media)
- Gary Buckenara
- Haydn Bunton, Jr.
- Haydn Bunton, Sr.
- Fred Buttsworth
- Bud Byfield (Administrator)
- Hugh 'Bonny' Campbell
- Ross Capes (Umpire)
- Derek Chadwick
- Geoff Christian (Media)
- David Christy
- Jack Clarke
- Henry "Ivo" Crapp (Umpire)
- Bill Dempsey
- George Doig
- Jerry Dolan
- Ross Elliott (Media)
- Graham Farmer
- Mike Fitzpatrick
- Brian Foley
- John Gerovich
- Ross Glendinning
- Barney Grecian
- Arthur Green
- H. B. Grosvenor (administrator)
- Brad Hardie
- Keith Harper
- Stan Heal
- Ern Henfry
- Ross Hutchinson (Coach)
- Ken Hunter
- Carlisle Jarvis
- Frank Jenkins
- Paddy Knox
- Johnny Leonard
- Clive Lewington
- Steve Marsh
- Denis Marshall
- Phillip Matson
- Les McClements
- Jack McDiarmid
- John McIntosh
- Merv McIntosh
- Guy McKenna
- Stephen Michael
- George Moloney
- Ray Montgomery (Umpire)
- Graham Moss
- Bernie Naylor
- Billy Orr (administrator)
- Tom Outridge
- George Owens
- Brian Peake
- Maurice Rioli
- Austin Robertson, Jr.
- Pat Rodriguez (Administrator)
- Norm Rogers
- Ray Schofield
- Ray Scott
- Jack Sheedy
- Keith Slater
- Ray Sorrell
- Frank Sparrow
- Val Sparrow
- Max Tetley
- John Todd
- William 'Digger' Thomas
- Albert Thurgood
- William 'Nipper' Truscott
- Ted Tyson
- Bill Walker
- Mel Whinnen
- Robert Wiley
- John Worsfold

Note: Barry Cable was also inducted in 2004 as a Legend, but his induction was rescinded and his Legend status revoked in 2023 after Cable was found civilly liable in a sexual abuse lawsuit.

== 2005 ==
10 inductees:

- Sydney 'Sammy' Clarke
- Jim Craig
- Larry Duffy
- Dean Kemp
- Laurie Kettlewell
- Chris Mainwaring
- Steve Malaxos
- Gerard Neesham
- Wally Stooke (Administrator)
- Peter Sumich

== 2006 ==
8 inductees:

- Greg Brehaut
- Deverick 'Mick' Cronin
- Les Fong
- Doug Green
- Ted Kilmurray
- Peter Matera
- Phil Narkle
- Charlie Tyson

== 2007 ==
9 inductees:

- Simon Beasley
- Merv Cowan (Administrator)
- Peter Featherby
- Ted Flemming
- Brian France
- Jim Gosnell
- John Guhl
- Graham Melrose
- Peter Spencer

== 2008 ==
9 inductees:

- Ken Armstrong (player-coach)
- Leon Baker
- George Grljusich (Media)
- Dave Ingraham
- Glen Jakovich
- Ken McAullay
- Ian Miller (player-coach)
- Henry Sharpe
- John K. Watts

== 2009 ==
9 inductees:

- Jim Conway
- John Lussick (Administrator)
- Darrell Panizza
- Alan Preen
- Charles Sweetman
- Ron Tucker
- Alan Watling
- Nicky Winmar
- Dave Woods

== 2010 ==
9 inductees:

- Mark Bairstow
- John Cooper
- Percy Johnson
- Dwayne Lamb
- Gary Malarkey
- Terry Moriarty
- Les Mumme
- Frank Treasure
- Wally Price

== 2011 ==
6 inductees:

- Duggan Anderson
- Don Marinko, Sr.
- Alf Moffat (administrator)
- George Prince
- Garry Sidebottom
- Peter Tannock (administrator)

== 2012 ==
6 inductees:

- Ben Allan
- Ashley McIntosh
- John O'Connell
- Herbie Screaigh
- Grant Vernon (umpire)
- Barry White

== 2013 ==
6 inductees:

- Peter Bell
- Chris Lewis
- Frank Hopkins
- Tom Wilson
- George Young
- Ray Richards

== 2015 ==
Eight inductees:

- Kevin Clune
- Oliver Drake Brockman (media)
- Tom Grljusich
- Paul Hasleby
- Syd Jackson
- Stan Nowotny
- Con Regan
- John Wynne

== 2017 ==
Ten inductees:

- Mike Ball (umpire)
- Simon Black
- Peter Bosustow
- Joel Corey
- Charles Doig
- Alan Johnson
- Derek Kickett
- Keith Narkle
- Bob Shields
- Frank Walker

== 2019 ==
Six inductees, and Stephen Michael elevated to Legend status:

- Dean Cox
- Darren Glass
- Chris Judd
- John Loughridge
- Warren Ralph
- Jack Simons (administrator)

== 2021 ==
Four inductees:

- Dennis Cometti (media)
- Jim Krakouer
- Matthew Pavlich
- Matthew Priddis

== 2022 ==
Four inductees:

- Stephen Curtis
- Jeff Farmer
- Michael Mitchell
- Shane Woewodin

== 2023 ==
Four inductees, and Mel Whinnen elevated to Legend status:

- Jan Cooper
- Phil Krakouer
- Alex Rance
- Allistair Pickett

== 2024 ==
Four inductees:

- Aaron Sandilands
- Dale Kickett
- Stan Magro
- Tony Buhagiar

== 2026 ==
Seven inductees, with Ray Sorrell and Peter Matera elevated to legend status.

- James Clement
- Alan East (media)
- Phil Kelly
- Josh Kennedy
- David Mundy
- Nic Naitanui
- Harry Taylor
