= 1946 WANFL season =

Australian rules football season

- Teams: 8
- Premiers: East Fremantle; 21st premiership
- Minor premiers: East Fremantle; 26th minor premiership
- Sandover Medallist: John Loughridge (West Perth)
- Leading goalkicker: Bernie Naylor (South Fremantle)
- Matches played: 80

The 1946 WANFL season was the 62nd season of senior football in Perth, Western Australia.

With the background of the Pacific War almost entirely removed, (Note: A few significant players such as Ray Scott, Fred Buttsworth and Tim Barker remained in the forces until 1947, whilst some others such as Ray Schofield returned while the season was ongoing.) the WANFL entered a period of exceptional growth that was to last until the middle 1960s. Attendances reached levels never seen in the pre-war WANFL, highlighted by two record crowds between grand finalists East Fremantle and West Perth. The league also restored the seconds competition, which had been placed into recess in 1941, as a “colts” competition for players under 25.

1946 is most famous for Old Easts' feat of a perfect season, (Note: No other senior WANFL team until 2018 when Subiaco did it had ever achieved even a perfect home-and-away season, though East Perth in the under-age competition of 1944 equalled the feat of East Fremantle in 1946. Since 1901, the only other clubs with one loss in a home-and-away season have been Claremont in 1987 and Subiaco in 2008, 2017 (when they lost both the second semi and the Grand Final) and 2019.) winning all twenty-one of its matches to finish the season with a winning streak of thirty-one consecutive games, easily the longest in the history of the competition.

There was a controversy in the third-last round when East Fremantle played Subiaco and, owing to a number of injuries, played colts wingman Harry Townsend in the league team. Although regulations did not permit a colts player to start in the league team on the same day. a protest by Subiaco was dismissed on a technicality. Old Easts' perfect season was only slightly marred by losing to third-placed VFL club Collingwood in an exhibition match at Subiaco Oval on October 15.

1946 also saw Perth, who had been in the doldrums since the end of World War I, begin a rise to power driven by the return of Merv McIntosh, who had not played since mid-1941. The Redlegs stood third with two games remaining but lost a decisive match to Subiaco, who played open-age finals for the first time in a decade, in spite of being very weak in attack and the failure of their protest against Townsend.

Swan Districts, who had reached the finals in 1945, fell to second-last place and began its bleakest period on record, as well as one of the bleakest in elite Australian rules football history. Until Haydn Bunton, Jr. joined the club in 1961, Swans were never to win more than seven games in a season, would receive seven wooden spoons and never finish higher than sixth. Overall Swan Districts won just 61 and drew one of 301 games played between 1946 and 1960, for a success rate of just 20.43 percent. Despite this, Swans won their first premiership of any kind in the seconds competition.

In spite of the return of Bernie Naylor, who went far beyond his 1941 promise with 131 goals, South Fremantle fell to fourth owing to injuries and business commitments, one of which caused their coach to resign while their form was at its best.

Perth and West Perth toured Sydney and Melbourne respectively during the first three weeks of August, and played each other four times during the season.

== Home-and-away season ==
=== Round 1 ===
| | Round 1 |
| Saturday, 27 April (2:45 pm) | Swan Districts 7.8 (50) | def. by | Subiaco 11.15 (81) | Bassendean Oval (crowd: 2065) |
| Saturday, 27 April (2:45 pm) | Perth 11.13 (79) | def. by | West Perth 19.13 (127) | WACA (crowd: 3120) |
| Saturday, 27 April (2:45 pm) | Claremont 8.12 (60) | def. by | South Fremantle 25.12 (162) | Subiaco Oval (crowd: 2533) |
| Saturday, 27 April (2:45 pm) | East Fremantle 17.13 (115) | def. | East Perth 14.15 (99) | Fremantle Oval (crowd: 3641) |
Bernie Naylor, playing for the first time since 1941 after returning from Darwin, kicks nine goals as South Fremantle, after their phenomenal recovery in 1945, crush Claremont.

=== Round 2 ===
| | Round 2 |
| Saturday, 4 May (2:45 pm) | South Fremantle 14.14 (98) | def. by | West Perth 15.13 (103) | Fremantle Oval (crowd: 4549) |
| Saturday, 4 May (2:45 pm) | East Perth 8.9 (57) | def. by | Swan Districts 10.6 (66) | Perth Oval (crowd: 3354) |
| Saturday, 4 May (2:45 pm) | Perth 21.18 (144) | def. | Claremont 15.7 (97) | WACA (crowd: 1403) |
| Saturday, 4 May (2:45 pm) | Subiaco 9.9 (63) | def. by | East Fremantle 11.18 (84) | Subiaco Oval (crowd: 4033) |
The Subiaco versus East Fremantle match saw an unexpected onlooker in former North Adelaide champion Ken Farmer, who was explaining the game to rugby league fans from Great Britain.; West Perth kick 7.3 (45) in the first half of the final quarter for a brilliant victory against a South Fremantle team missing the toughness of “Scranno” Jenkins.

=== Round 3 ===
| | Round 3 |
| Saturday, 11 May (2:45 pm) | West Perth 12.25 (97) | def. | Swan Districts 11.8 (74) | Leederville Oval |
| Saturday, 11 May (2:45 pm) | East Perth 9.6 (60) | def. by | South Fremantle 19.12 (126) | Perth Oval (crowd: 4208) |
| Saturday, 11 May (2:45 pm) | Subiaco 10.15 (75) | def. by | Perth 12.8 (80) | Subiaco Oval (crowd: 2802) |
| Saturday, 11 May (2:45 pm) | East Fremantle 13.23 (101) | def. | Claremont 10.8 (68) | Fremantle Oval (crowd: 2604) |
Claremont, who had not won since Round 8 of 1945, surprised by leading an inaccurate East Fremantle for three quarters before the exhausted Tigers collapse.

=== Round 4 ===
| | Round 4 |
| Saturday, 18 May (2:45 pm) | South Fremantle 17.16 (118) | def. | Swan Districts 10.7 (67) | Fremantle Oval (crowd: 4419) |
| Saturday, 18 May (2:45 pm) | East Perth 12.7 (79) | drew with | West Perth 11.13 (79) | Perth Oval (crowd: 4996) |
| Saturday, 18 May (2:45 pm) | Claremont 7.10 (52) | def. by | Subiaco 12.25 (97) | Subiaco Oval |
| Saturday, 18 May (2:45 pm) | Perth 7.12 (54) | def. by | East Fremantle 13.21 (99) | WACA (crowd: 2912) |

=== Round 5 ===
| | Round 5 |
| Saturday, 25 May (2:45 pm) | West Perth 20.11 (131) | def. | Subiaco 8.4 (52) | Leederville Oval (crowd: 4625) |
| Saturday, 25 May (2:45 pm) | Swan Districts 6.5 (41) | def. by | Perth 13.10 (88) | Bassendean Oval |
| Saturday, 25 May (2:45 pm) | Claremont 10.9 (69) | def. by | East Perth 11.13 (79) | Subiaco Oval |
| Saturday, 25 May (2:45 pm) | East Fremantle 14.16 (100) | def. | South Fremantle 8.13 (61) | Fremantle Oval (crowd: 10123) |
In front of the biggest recorded home-and-away attendance in WANFL history to that point – though soon to be broken – East Fremantle confirm that they will be even more potent than in 1945 with a superb display against their port rivals.

=== Round 6 (Foundation Day) ===
| | Round 6 |
| Saturday, 1 June (2:45 pm) | Subiaco 13.10 (88) | def. | South Fremantle 6.12 (48) | Subiaco Oval (crowd: 3988) |
| Saturday, 1 June (2:45 pm) | East Perth 21.15 (141) | def. | Perth 14.8 (92) | Perth Oval (crowd: 5084) |
| Saturday, 1 June (2:45 pm) | Swan Districts 10.18 (78) | def. by | Claremont 14.18 (102) | Bassendean Oval (crowd: 1746) |
| Monday, 3 June (2:45 pm) | East Fremantle 15.9 (99) | def. | West Perth 10.15 (75) | Subiaco Oval (crowd: 16494) |
Following the removal of government bans on weekday sport, the WANFL plays on Foundation Day for the first time since 1941.; A record WANFL home-and-away attendance sees East Fremantle prove its strength in a most “deliberate” manner as it overcomes a nine-point half-time deficit for another convincing win.; Claremont end their longest losing streak until 1958 and still their second-longest on record with a strong third-quarter burst.

=== Round 7 (King's Birthday) ===
| | Round 7 |
| Saturday, 8 June (2:45 pm) | Perth 9.11 (65) | def. | South Fremantle 7.16 (58) | WACA (crowd: 3213) |
| Saturday, 8 June (2:45 pm) | West Perth 21.18 (144) | def. | Claremont 16.8 (104) | Leederville Oval (crowd: 3337) |
| Saturday, 8 June (2:45 pm) | East Fremantle 23.21 (159) | def. | Swan Districts 9.14 (68) | Fremantle Oval (crowd: 1052) |
| Monday, 10 June (2:45 pm) | Subiaco 9.12 (66) | def. by | East Perth 17.12 (114) | Subiaco Oval (crowd: 10121) |
The resignation of coach Neil Lewington for business reasons seems to disturb South Fremantle as Perth outscore them into the wind in the final quarter.

=== Round 8 ===
| | Round 8 |
| Saturday, 15 June (2:45 pm) | Subiaco 11.9 (75) | def. | Swan Districts 9.6 (60) | Subiaco Oval (crowd: 1779) |
| Saturday, 15 June (2:45 pm) | West Perth 9.16 (70) | def. by | Perth 15.13 (103) | Leederville Oval (crowd: 3186) |
| Saturday, 15 June (2:45 pm) | South Fremantle 17.13 (115) | def. | Claremont 13.13 (91) | Fremantle Oval (crowd: 3458) |
| Saturday, 15 June (2:45 pm) | East Perth 11.9 (75) | def. by | East Fremantle 15.15 (105) | Perth Oval (crowd: 8609) |
A number of spectators hooted at field umpire Ryan after East Fremantle win its eighteenth consecutive WANFL victory, and in the crush a woman was knocked hard and collapsed, having to be driven by ambulance to Perth Hospital.

=== Round 9 ===
| | Round 9 |
| Saturday, 22 June (2:45 pm) | West Perth 13.16 (94) | def. | South Fremantle 14.2 (86) | Leederville Oval (crowd: 6002) |
| Saturday, 22 June (2:45 pm) | Swan Districts 12.8 (80) | def. by | East Perth 15.10 (100) | Bassendean Oval (crowd: 1955) |
| Saturday, 22 June (2:45 pm) | Claremont 12.5 (77) | def. by | Perth 12.15 (87) | Subiaco Oval (crowd: 2570) |
| Saturday, 22 June (2:45 pm) | East Fremantle 16.17 (113) | def. | Subiaco 7.9 (51) | Fremantle Oval (crowd: 2944) |
West Perth kick 8.5 (53) to one goal in the first quarter but stop to a walk afterwards and feel relieved as the siren sounds. South Fremantle's score remains their most accurate in senior WA(N)FL football.

=== Round 10 ===
| | Round 10 |
| Saturday, 29 June (2:45 pm) | Swan Districts 18.11 (119) | drew with | West Perth 17.17 (119) | Bassendean Oval (crowd: 2014) |
| Saturday, 29 June (2:45 pm) | South Fremantle 15.14 (104) | def. | East Perth 13.15 (93) | Fremantle Oval (crowd: 5590) |
| Saturday, 29 June (2:45 pm) | Perth 5.10 (40) | def. by | Subiaco 6.14 (50) | WACA (crowd: 3834) |
| Saturday, 29 June (2:45 pm) | Claremont 10.9 (69) | def. by | East Fremantle 27.14 (176) | Subiaco Oval (crowd: 2253) |
Swans' surprising tie with West Perth is the highest-scoring draw in WA(N)FL history and the last senior WANFL draw until the penultimate round of 1957. (Note: The intervening 948-game gap constitutes the longest non-occurrence of draws in any major Australian Rules competition.)

=== Round 11 ===
| | Round 11 |
| Saturday, 6 July (2:45 pm) | South Fremantle 18.14 (122) | def. | Swan Districts 12.15 (87) | Fremantle Oval (crowd: 3001) |
| Saturday, 6 July (2:45 pm) | West Perth 13.10 (88) | def. | East Perth 7.10 (52) | Leederville Oval (crowd: 5902) |
| Saturday, 6 July (2:45 pm) | Claremont 8.9 (57) | def. by | Subiaco 10.17 (77) | Subiaco Oval |
| Saturday, 6 July (2:45 pm) | Perth 8.6 (54) | def. by | East Fremantle 11.17 (83) | WACA (crowd: 1652) |
During one of Perth's wettest months on record, East Fremantle show their usual brilliant teamwork on a waterlogged surface to push Perth to fifth.

=== Round 12 ===
| | Round 12 |
| Saturday, 13 July (2:45 pm) | Subiaco 6.26 (62) | def. | West Perth 7.7 (49) | Subiaco Oval (crowd: 3399) |
| Saturday, 13 July (2:45 pm) | Perth 6.11 (47) | def. | Swan Districts 3.5 (23) | WACA (crowd: 1372) |
| Saturday, 13 July (2:45 pm) | East Perth 17.17 (119) | def. | Claremont 4.7 (31) | Perth Oval |
| Saturday, 13 July (2:45 pm) | East Fremantle 17.16 (118) | def. | South Fremantle 10.9 (69) | Fremantle Oval (crowd: 5564) |
The rainiest spell in the recorded climatic history of Perth produces extremely heavy grounds which results in: 1. Swan Districts kicking their lowest score until 1964 and still sixth-lowest on record and equal lowest against Perth.; 2. The aggregate score of just 9.16 (70) remains the lowest for any Swan Districts game.; Subiaco record the third-biggest win by a team scoring fewer goals in WA(N)FL history as they defend magnificently into the breeze against their powerful opponents during the final quarter. (Note: East Fremantle have twice won by 14 points scoring fewer goals, against Perth in 1918 and against South Fremantle in 1931.)

=== Round 13 ===
| | Round 13 |
| Saturday, 20 July (2:45 pm) | South Fremantle 15.7 (97) | def. by | Subiaco 15.16 (106) | Fremantle Oval (crowd: 3433) |
| Saturday, 20 July (2:45 pm) | Perth 8.8 (56) | def. by | East Perth 8.12 (60) | WACA (crowd: 2498) |
| Saturday, 20 July (2:45 pm) | Claremont 13.17 (95) | def. | Swan Districts 8.17 (65) | Leederville Oval (crowd: 823) |
| Saturday, 20 July (2:45 pm) | East Fremantle 15.15 (105) | def. | West Perth 8.13 (61) | Subiaco Oval (crowd: 4809) |
Despite the return of “Scranno” Jenkins after a serious knee injury, South Fremantle fall to sixth as Fred Williams seals a close match after a bad kick-in.

=== Round 14 ===
| | Round 14 |
| Saturday, 27 July (2:45 pm) | South Fremantle 14.18 (102) | def. | Perth 11.14 (80) | Fremantle Oval (crowd: 3946) |
| Saturday, 27 July (2:45 pm) | East Perth 7.14 (56) | def. | Subiaco 5.8 (38) | Perth Oval (crowd: 7211) |
| Saturday, 27 July (2:45 pm) | Claremont 8.8 (56) | def. by | West Perth 12.12 (84) | Subiaco Oval (crowd: 2337) |
| Saturday, 27 July (2:45 pm) | Swan Districts 10.13 (73) | def. by | East Fremantle 15.14 (104) | Bassendean Oval (crowd: 1269) |

=== Round 15 ===
| | Round 15 |
| Monday, 6 May (2:45 pm) | Perth 11.6 (72) | def. by | West Perth 18.20 (128) | Subiaco Oval (crowd: 3091) |
| Saturday, 3 August (2:45 pm) | Swan Districts 9.8 (62) | def. | Subiaco 6.14 (50) | Bassendean Oval (crowd: 1677) |
| Saturday, 3 August (2:45 pm) | Claremont 9.9 (63) | def. by | South Fremantle 21.11 (137) | Subiaco Oval (crowd: 2509) |
| Saturday, 3 August (2:45 pm) | East Fremantle 25.19 (169) | def. | East Perth 9.8 (62) | Fremantle Oval (crowd: 5285) |
In very wet and slippery conditions, Old Easts produce what was regarded as the best display of their twenty-five straight victories with brilliant handball and backing up, resulting in East Perth losing its place in the four to South Fremantle with a tough draw to come.

=== Round 16 ===
| | Round 16 |
| Saturday, 10 August (2:45 pm) | Subiaco 7.12 (54) | def. | East Perth 7.8 (50) | Subiaco Oval (crowd: 5065) |
| Saturday, 10 August (2:45 pm) | Swan Districts 13.12 (90) | def. | Claremont 10.13 (73) | Bassendean Oval |
| Saturday, 10 August (2:45 pm) | South Fremantle 12.16 (88) | def. by | East Fremantle 16.14 (110) | Fremantle Oval (crowd: 6500) |
| Wednesday, 28 August (2:45 pm) | Perth 20.11 (131) | def. | West Perth 10.15 (75) | Subiaco Oval (crowd: 3800) |
Bernie Naylor kicks his hundredth goal as South, despite inaccurate kicking, manage to compete with the unbeaten blue and whites despite never being in the match after conceding eight goals into the wind in heavy rain.; Subiaco consolidate their place in the four as captain Fred Williams produces a brilliant goal in difficult conditions for Neil Althorpe in the last minute.; Ron Tucker kicks eleven goals in a match played on a Wednesday afternoon due to the Redleg and Cardinal tours earlier in August, and Perth move to third with two matches remaining.

=== Round 17 ===
| | Round 17 |
| Saturday, 24 August (2:45 pm) | West Perth 19.26 (140) | def. | South Fremantle 16.6 (102) | Leederville Oval (crowd: 7376) |
| Saturday, 24 August (2:45 pm) | East Perth 12.8 (80) | def. by | Swan Districts 15.17 (107) | Perth Oval (crowd: 3112) |
| Saturday, 24 August (2:45 pm) | Perth 16.19 (115) | def. | Claremont 9.19 (73) | WACA (crowd: 1382) |
| Saturday, 24 August (2:45 pm) | East Fremantle 10.19 (79) | def. | Subiaco 7.14 (56) | Fremantle Oval (crowd: 2739) |
Despite a protest against H. Townsend, who owing to Old Easts' bad run with injuries started the league game after playing for the colts, East Fremantle – if below their best – kick 5.5 (35) to 1.2 (8) in the final quarter for their twenty-seventh straight victory, during which apart from the initial game no opponent had got closer than sixteen points.

=== Round 18 ===
| | Round 18 |
| Saturday, 31 August (2:45 pm) | West Perth 12.16 (88) | def. | Swan Districts 4.4 (28) | Leederville Oval (crowd: 2692) |
| Saturday, 31 August (2:45 pm) | South Fremantle 12.11 (83) | def. | East Perth 6.11 (47) | Fremantle Oval (crowd: 3267) |
| Saturday, 31 August (2:45 pm) | Subiaco 7.5 (47) | def. | Perth 5.9 (39) | Subiaco Oval (crowd: 5627) |
| Saturday, 31 August (2:45 pm) | Claremont 8.16 (64) | def. by | East Fremantle 11.9 (75) | WACA (crowd: 669) |
Subiaco seal their first senior finals berth since 1936 with a fine comeback in very windy and chilly conditions after scoring only 1.3 (9) until half-time; Despite Johnny Compton kicking 4.10 (34), Claremont extend Old Easts all game but cannot capitalise often enough to break their winning streak.

=== Round 19 ===
| | Round 19 |
| Saturday, 7 September (2:45 pm) | Swan Districts 11.16 (82) | def. by | South Fremantle 14.19 (103) | Bassendean Oval (crowd: 2883) |
| Saturday, 7 September (2:45 pm) | East Perth 10.6 (66) | def. by | West Perth 19.22 (136) | Perth Oval (crowd: 2883) |
| Saturday, 7 September (2:45 pm) | Subiaco 6.19 (55) | def. by | Claremont 10.8 (68) | Subiaco Oval |
| Saturday, 7 September (2:45 pm) | East Fremantle 20.19 (139) | def. | Perth 15.9 (99) | Fremantle Oval (crowd: 3732) |
Perth fail in the virtually impossible task of beating East Fremantle to stay in the four, as Old Easts recover the form they showed before the interstate match to never be seriously challenged.; South Fremantle, despite Naylor kicking six behinds from nine shots, get over a persistent Swan Districts to take the Redlegs' place.

== Ladder ==
1946 WANFL ladder
| Pos | Team | Pld | W | L | D | PF | PA | PP | Pts |
|---|---|---|---|---|---|---|---|---|---|
| 1 | East Fremantle (P) | 19 | 19 | 0 | 0 | 2133 | 1309 | 162.9 | 76 |
| 2 | West Perth | 19 | 12 | 5 | 2 | 1888 | 1567 | 120.5 | 52 |
| 3 | South Fremantle | 19 | 10 | 9 | 0 | 1879 | 1654 | 113.6 | 40 |
| 4 | Subiaco | 19 | 10 | 9 | 0 | 1243 | 1329 | 93.5 | 40 |
| 5 | Perth | 19 | 9 | 10 | 0 | 1525 | 1565 | 97.4 | 36 |
| 6 | East Perth | 19 | 7 | 11 | 1 | 1489 | 1664 | 89.5 | 30 |
| 7 | Swan Districts | 19 | 4 | 14 | 1 | 1320 | 1758 | 75.1 | 18 |
| 8 | Claremont | 19 | 3 | 16 | 0 | 1369 | 2000 | 68.5 | 12 |

Rules for classification: 1) points; 2) percentage; 3) number of points for.
(P) Premiers

== Finals ==
=== First semi-final ===
| | First semi-final |
| Saturday, 14 September (2:45 pm) | South Fremantle 14.13 (97) | def. by | Subiaco 16.4 (100) | Subiaco Oval (crowd: 12,514) |
An unexpected move of skipper Fred Williams to full-forward results in an upset win for the Maroons, who kick a surprising 9.0 (54) with the wind in the first quarter and hold off the red and whites in the last.

=== Second semi-final ===
| | Second semi-final |
| Saturday, 21 September (2:45 pm) | East Fremantle 9.21 (75) | def. | West Perth 10.11 (71) | Subiaco Oval (crowd: 17,369) |
East Fremantle maintain their perfect record with a goal soccered by Green with twenty seconds remaining after a hectic finish that had seen Old Easts kick 1.13 (19) since half-time.

=== Preliminary final ===
| | Preliminary final |
| Saturday, 28 September (2:45 pm) | West Perth 12.14 (86) | def. | Subiaco 5.7 (37) | Subiaco Oval (crowd: 15,426) |
In a disappointing spectacle after the thrilling semi-finals, Subiaco's lack of teamwork means it never has a chance.

=== Grand Final ===
1946 WANFL Grand Final
Saturday, 5 October (2:45 pm) | East Fremantle | def. | West Perth | Subiaco Oval (crowd: 21,000)
1.4 (10); 6.7 (43); 7.12 (54); 11.13 (79) | Q1; Q2; Q3; Final | 4.2 (26); 6.5 (41); 7.8 (50); 10.13 (73) | Umpires: F.V. Ryan; Simpson Medal: John Loughridge (West Perth)
Prince 4, French 3, McDonald 3, Green | Goals | Pola 4, Schofield 2, Kingsbury 2, Hutchinson, Larcombe
Alan Ebbs, Jack Clark, Doig, Gabrielson, F. Clarke, McDonald, Jeffreys | Best | Loughridge (best on ground), Pola, Kingsbury, Harman, Clamp, Fleming
Ken Ebbs (ankle) | Injuries
In a brilliant match, East Fremantle's steadiness in a crisis during the final quarter gives it a record undefeated season as West Perth fail to get the equalising goal at the finish.

== Collingwood Tour Match ==
East Fremantle v Collingwood
Tuesday, 15 October (2:45 pm) | East Fremantle | def. by | Collingwood | Subiaco Oval (crowd: 16,100)
2.1 (13); 3.8 (26); 8.10 (58); 9.10 (64) | Q1; Q2; Q3; Final | 5.6 (36); 6.10 (46); 10.13 (73); 11.16 (82) | Umpires: F.V. Ryan
Sheedy 2.4, French 1.3, Green 1.2, Scorer 1.0, Alan Ebbs 1.0, Soltoggio 1.0, Prince 1.0, J. Clark 1.0 | Goals | Pimm 4.2, Richards 3.1, Fitzgerald 1.1, Rose 1.1, Ryan 1.0, Holten 1.0, Kyne 0.4, Mann 0.1, Lambert 0.1, Newman 0.1
C. Doig, Beccaria, Mellowship, Briggs, J. Clark, Sheedy, French, Prince, Green | Best | Richards, Rose, Burns, Murphy, Lambert, Holten, Utting, Kyne
Despite not being happy with the rule interpretations of local umpire Ryan, Collingwood manage to keep ahead of the unbeaten WANFL premiers all game – yet are still impressed by the quality of Old Easts' play.
