= Jim Conway (footballer) =

Australian rules footballer & coach (1925–2003)

Personal information
- Full name: James Francis Conway
- Born: 14 June 1925; North Fremantle, Western Australia
- Died: 3 December 2003 (aged 78); Perth, Western Australia
- Original team: North Fremantle (Ex-Scholars)
- Positions: Rover, centre half-forward

Playing career^{1}
| Years | Club | Games (Goals) |
| 1943–56 | East Fremantle | 180 (343) |

Representative team honours
| Years | Team | Games (Goals) |
| 1947–56 | Western Australia | 15 (21) |

Coaching career^{3}
| Years | Club | Games (W–L–D) |
| 1964–68 | Claremont | 110 (53–46–1) |
- ^{1} Playing statistics correct to the end of 1956.^{3} Coaching statistics correct as of 1968.

Career highlights
- East Fremantle captain 1943, 1948, 1951, 1956; East Fremantle premiership side 1943, 1946; East Fremantle best and fairest 1950; Sandover Medal 1950; East Fremantle leading goal-kicker 1951; East Fremantle Team of the Century (1997); Fremantle Football Hall of Legends (1998); West Australian Football Hall of Fame (2009)

James Francis Conway (14 June 1925 – 28 December 2003) was an Australian rules football player and coach. The winner of the 1950 Sandover Medal, Conway played 180 games for East Fremantle in the Western Australian National Football League (WANFL) between 1943 and 1956, also representing Western Australia in 15 interstate matches. In 1964, he was appointed coach of Claremont, a position which he held for five years, until 1968. He was inducted into the West Australian Football Hall of Fame in 2009.

== Career ==
Born in North Fremantle, Conway originally played football for the North Fremantle team in the Ex-Scholars league. He made his debut for East Fremantle in 1943 at the age of 17 in the war-time underage competition, and, as captain, was involved in East Fremantle's premiership in his first year. In August 1944, he enlisted in the Royal Australian Air Force as a Leading Aircraftman, and was stationed with the 12 Aircraft Repair Depot until June 1946, when he was discharged. On his return to Western Australia, Conway immediately resumed playing with East Fremantle, and again played in a premiership. He made his interstate debut for Western Australia in 1947, and the following season was appointed captain of East Fremantle, a role he would reprise in 1951 and 1956.

Playing mainly as a rover, and on occasion at centre half-forward, Conway won both East Fremantle's best and fairest award, the Lynn Medal, and the Sandover Medal for the best player in the competition in 1950. The following season he kicked 77 goals to be East Fremantle's leading goalkicker. Conway retired in 1956 having played 180 games for East Fremantle, kicking 343 goals, as well as representing Western Australia on 15 occasions, kicking 21 goals. In total, he record 78 Sandover Medal votes over his career. After his retirement, Conway was recruited as captain-coach of Coolamon in country New South Wales, taking over from ex-South Fremantle player Frank Treasure. In 1964, Claremont signed Conway as coach, replacing Peter Pianto. After finishing last the previous two seasons, Claremont finished fourth in the regular season for 1964, with 12 wins and nine losses, qualifying for the finals. The club defeated Subiaco in the opening semi-final, and then went on to defeat Perth in the preliminary final, qualifying for the grand final against minor premiers East Fremantle, Conway's old team. In the grand final, Claremont defeated East Fremantle 14.18 (102) to 15.8 (98), to win their first premiership since 1940. Conway spent four more seasons in charge of Claremont, with the club making the finals in 1965 only. He also coached the state team on a number of occasions.

In 1997, Conway was included as the rover in East Fremantle's Team of the Century. He was included in the Fremantle Football Hall of Legends in 1998, and inducted into the West Australian Football Hall of Fame in 2009.
