= Martin Atkins (disambiguation) =

Martin Atkins (born 1959) is an English drummer and session musician

Martin Atkins may refer to:

- Marty Atkins (born 1969), former Australian rules footballer
- Martin Atkins (darts player, born 1965), English professional darts player
- Martin Atkins (darts player, born 1975), English professional darts player
- Martin Atkins (programmer)
