= Bernie Naylor =

Australian rules footballer (1923–1993)

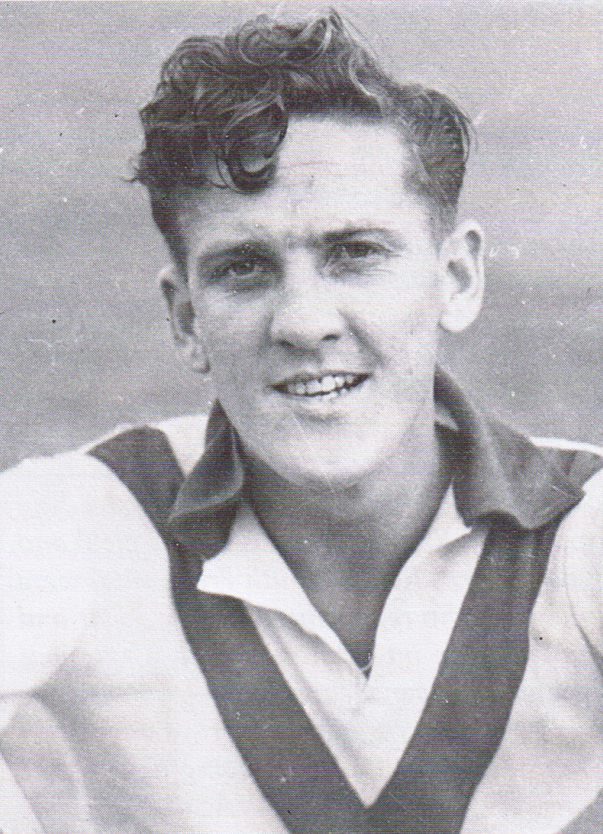

Personal information
- Full name: Bernard George Andrew Naylor
- Born: 19 April 1923; Fremantle, Western Australia
- Died: 26 September 1993 (aged 70); Attadale, Western Australia
- Original team: Fremantle C.B.C Old Boys
- Debut: South Fremantle
- Height: 188 cm (6 ft 2 in)
- Weight: 83 kg (183 lb)
- Position: Full-forward

Playing career^{1}
Years	Club	Games (Goals)
1941, 1946–54	South Fremantle	194 (1034)

Representative team honours
Years	Team	Games (Goals)
1946–1954	Western Australia	16 (44)
- ^{1} Playing statistics correct to the end of 1954.

Career highlights
- 6× WANFL Premiership player: (1947, 1948, 1950, 1952, 1953, 1954); Leading goalkicker (WANFL) 1946–48, 1952–54; Most goals in a single WA(N)FL game: 23 (vs Subiaco, 1953); Most goals in a single WA(N)FL season: 167 (1953); Australian Football Hall of Fame, inducted 2018

Bernard George Andrew Naylor (19 April 1923 – 26 September 1993) was an Australian rules footballer who was one of the most successful full-forwards in the history of the West Australian Football League. The WAFL now awards the leading goalscorer each year the Bernie Naylor Medal.

== Football career ==
Naylor began his football career with Fremantle Christian Brothers College Old Boys of the WAAFL in 1940 and made his debut for South Fremantle in 1941. Naylor kicked sixty goals in his debut season, including nine in the first semi-final against Claremont, but the Second World War caused the WANFL to revert to an underage competition for three seasons. Owing to military service in Darwin Naylor did not wear the red and white again until 1946, when he scored 131 goals to head the WANFL goalkicking for the first of six occasions. The following season, Naylor played in the first of six South Fremantle premiership teams over an eight-year period that is generally regarded as the strongest team in WA(N)FL history, being one of three players present in all six Grand Final victories. Naylor naturally became the first choice full-forward for interstate games, but after having injury problems during the 1949 season was surprisingly played as a half-forward flanker for part of the next two seasons.

In 1952, however, Naylor asserted himself as one of the greatest goalkickers in the history of Australian Rules with a tally of 147 goals, which beat George Doig's 1937 record of 144. Included in this was a haul of nineteen goals against East Fremantle that put the blue and whites out of the finals for the first time in thirty-seven seasons. The following season was even more brilliant as Naylor won South Fremantle's best and fairest award, an achievement none of the WANFL's previous great full forwards had ever managed, and broke his own record with 167 goals including eight in the Grand Final against West Perth. Against lowly Subiaco Naylor kicked a total of 48 goals in three games, including a still-standing WANFL record of 23 (including 12 in a quarter) in their third meeting, plus eighteen in their first despite leg problems. After the Grand Final South Fremantle played twice against the champion Footscray defence.^{[a]} The teams won one game each; with Naylor kicking a further 7 goals.

In 1954, Naylor was again leading goalkicker with 133, but his work as a property developer meant he intended to retire after the season.

In ten seasons and 194 games with South, Naylor kicked 1034 goals, He also kicked 44 goals in 16 interstate football games for Western Australia, for a total of 210 career senior games and 1078 senior career goals.

He was the leading goalkicker for South Fremantle in all ten seasons that he played at the club, kicking over 100 goals on five occasions. He was only held goalless in a match on five occasions, four in the WANFL and once in interstate football against South Australia.

Naylor relied for his success on long torpedo punts and extremely fast leading to space: unlike his successor John Gerovich he was not a spectacular high mark but had a safe pair of hands and considerable strength from his 86 kilograms (190 lb) frame.

== Post-career honours ==
He was inducted to the Fremantle Football Hall of Legends in 1996 and the West Australian Football Hall of Fame in 2004. He was inducted into the WA Hall of Champions in 2005.

Since 1996 the leading goalkicker each year in the West Australian Football League has been awarded the Bernie Naylor Medal.

== Notes ==
^{a} Footscray's home-and-away average of 53.28 points "Against" per match in 1953 is the lowest in the VFL/AFL since 1920.
