= William "Nipper" Truscott =

Australian sportsman (1886–1966)

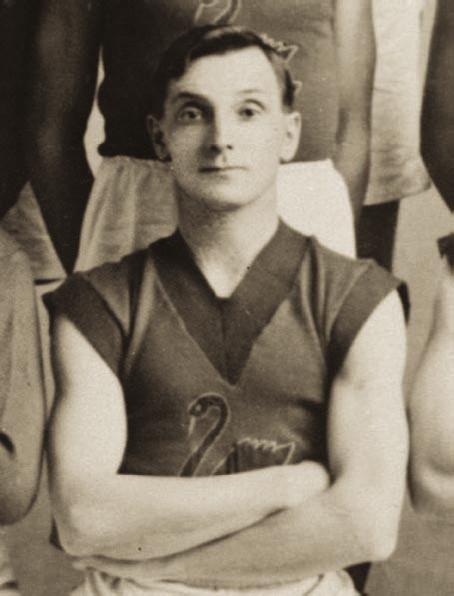

Personal information
- Born: 9 October 1886; Lithgow, New South Wales, Australia
- Died: 20 June 1966 (aged 79); East Fremantle, Western Australia
- Original team: Trafalgar juniors
- Height: 175 cm (5 ft 9 in)
- Weight: 66 kg (146 lb)
- Positions: Rover, forward pocket

Playing career^{1}
Years	Club	Games (Goals)
1907–12	Mines Rovers	unknown
1913–24	East Fremantle	202 (90)

Representative team honours^{2}
Years	Team	Games (Goals)
1908–24	Western Australia	16 (2)

Coaching career^{3}
Years	Club	Games (W–L–D)
1925–26	East Fremantle	37 (24–13–0)
1934–35	Perth	41 (18–23–0)
- ^{1} Playing statistics correct to the end of 1924.^{2} Representative statistics correct as of 1924.^{3} Coaching statistics correct as of 1935.

Career highlights
- East Fremantle premiership side 1914, 1918, 1925; East Fremantle captain 1916–22; Australian Football Hall of Fame inductee 1996; W.A. Football Hall of Fame inductee 2004

William John "Nipper" Truscott Jr. (9 October 1886 in Lithgow, New South Wales – 20 June 1966 in East Fremantle, Western Australia) was an Australian sportsman. He played over 300 games of Australian rules football for Mines Rovers in the Goldfields Football League (GFL) and East Fremantle in the West Australian Football League, and represented Western Australia at football, cricket and lawn bowls. He was inducted into the Sport Australia Hall of Fame in 1985 and the Australian Football Hall of Fame in 1996.

== Family ==
The second son of William John Truscott (1859–1914), and Susannah Truscott, née Strickland, William John Truscott was born in Lithgow, New South Wales on 9 October 1886.

He married Alice Stenlake Huxham (1888–1970) in Kalgoorlie, Western Australia on 22 May 1912. They had seven children.

== Football career ==
Truscott grew up in Sydney where he played rugby union. He moved with his family to Kalgoorlie on the Western Australian Goldfields at the age of 14, and began playing for the Trafalgar Football Club's junior side.

Truscott was a durable rover (175 cm, 66 kg), who played to age 41. Lithgow born Truscott was a doyen of West Australian football, and an all round sportsman, once representing Western Australia in a first-class cricket match as a wicket-keeper and also playing bowls. Partnered by Harry Snook, he won an Australian pairs bowls title in 1955.

Nicknamed 'Nipper' as a boy for his quickness in Rugby Union, he grew up in Sydney, only taking up Australian rules football when his family moved to the goldfields in Kalgoorlie, Western Australia in 1899. He was an exceptional player for Mines Rovers club at a time when the Goldfields League was considered to be almost the equal of any other league in the country. Truscott was chosen to represent Western Australia in the 1908 national carnival side – the first of his record five carnival appearances over 18 years.

Having married in 1912 he then moved to Perth where he became a postmaster. He commenced in the 1913 season with the East Fremantle Football Club, and quickly established himself as the WAFL's leading centreman. His ability to pass the ball (always with a drop kick) accurately to teammates was a feature of his play. He played in three premiership teams and in seven that were runners-up. He later acted as coach, club and State selector, club secretary and delegate.

== Honours ==
- Truscott was an inaugural member of the Western Australian Institute's Hall of Fame in August 1985, and in the same year he was listed in the Sport Australia Hall of Fame.
- Truscott was made a member of the Fremantle Football Club created Fremantle Football Hall of Legends in 1996.
- In 2004 he was awarded Legend Status in the West Australian Football Hall of Fame. The Nipper Truscott Pavilion at East Fremantle Oval is named in his honour.
- In 1996 Truscott was inducted into the Australian Football Hall of Fame.

== Death ==
Truscott died at the age of 79, on 20 June 1966 in Western Australia.

== See also ==
- 1908 Melbourne Carnival
- 1911 Adelaide Carnival
- 1914 Sydney Carnival
- 1921 Perth Carnival
- 1924 Hobart Carnival
- List of Western Australia first-class cricketers
