= John Hughes (motor dealer) =

Australian businessman and car dealer

John Joseph Hughes
- Born: 6 December 1935 (age 90)

John Joseph Hughes is an Australian businessman best known for his eponymous car dealership.

== Biography ==
=== Early life ===
Hughes was born in Fremantle, Western Australia in 1935 and attended Christian Brothers College, Fremantle. As a teenager he began working at a car dealership while studying accounting by correspondence. By his late 20s he owned his own car dealership.

=== Automotive sales ===
His dealership was the world's highest-selling Hyundai dealer for the consecutive years between 1997 and 2003. John was pivotal in introducing the Korean car marque to Australia. His automotive group also markets other major car brands, including, MG, LDV, Mitsubishi, Volkswagen, Ford, Kia and Chrysler's Jeep.

He is on record as driving only cars that he sells.
