= Ray Schofield =

Australian rules footballer

Personal information
- Full name: Raymond John Schofield
- Born: 7 August 1925; Subiaco, Western Australia
- Died: 23 December 2017 (aged 92)
- Original team: North Perth
- Positions: full-back, full-forward

Playing career^{1}
Years	Club	Games (Goals)
1946–1958	West Perth	259 (172)
- ^{1} Playing statistics correct to the end of 1958.

Career highlights
- 2 x WANFL premiership player (1949, 1951); 5x best and fairest winner West Perth (1948, 1950, 1953-1955)

Raymond John Schofield (7 August 1925 – 23 December 2017) was an Australian rules footballer who played with West Perth in the Western Australian National Football League (WANFL).

Schofield began his career as a full-forward in the wartime under-19 competition (which is excluded in some sources), and headed the WANFL goalkicking in 1943 with 93 goals. He did not play in 1944 or 1945 due to service with the Royal Australian Air Force in World War II.

Schofield would make his senior WANFL debut late in 1946, where he played as a forward in the Cardinals’ losing Grand Final team. In 1947, coach Stan “Pops” Heal moved Schofield to full-back after former spearhead Bill Baker was unsuccessful there, and he developed into a champion defender over the next decade.

At full-back, Ray Schofield was a five time best and fairest winner at West Perth, in 1948, 1950, and 1953 to 1955. He played in West Perth’s 1949 and 1951 premiership teams, taking several critical marks to help win the latter encounter. In the twilight of his career, Schofield returned to attack, heading West Perth’s goalkicking again in 1957.

In his final season in 1958, Schofield played his 248th career game in Round 10 to break William "Digger" Thomas' long-standing West Australian elite football career games record, and two weeks later became the first West Australian elite football player to play 250 career games.

Schofield also played 22 interstate football matches for Western Australia, including matches at the 1950 Brisbane and 1953 Adelaide Carnivals. He was selected as the full-back in West Perth’s official "Team of the Century", and in 2004 was one of the inaugural inductees in the West Australian Football Hall of Fame.
