= Frank Treasure =

Australian rules footballer

Personal information
- Full name: Francis William Treasure
- Born: 10 January 1925; Fremantle, Western Australia
- Died: 9 April 1998 (aged 73)
- Original team: CBC (Fremantle Ex-Scholars)
- Positions: Half-back flanker, wing

Playing career^{1}
Years	Club	Games (Goals)
1942–57	South Fremantle	254 (5)

Representative team honours
Years	Team	Games (Goals)
1949–51	Western Australia	5 (0)
- ^{1} Playing statistics correct to the end of 1957.

Career highlights
- South Fremantle premiership side 1947, 1948, 1950 1952, 1953, 1954; Runner-up Sandover Medal 1951; South Fremantle captain 1954–55; Fremantle Football Hall of Legends (1998); West Australian Football Hall of Fame (2010)

Francis William "Frank" Treasure, Sr. (10 January 1925 – 9 April 1998) was an Australian rules footballer who played for the South Fremantle Football Club in the Western Australian National Football League (WANFL). He also represented Western Australia in five interstate matches. Treasure was inducted into the West Australian Football Hall of Fame in 2010.

== Career ==
Treasure began his career playing for CBC in the Fremantle Ex-Scholars' competition. He participated in 1942 and 1943 for South Fremantle in the Western Australian National Football League (WANFL), which was restricted to players under the age of 18 for the duration of World War II. He joined the Australian Army in February 1943 as a corporal in the 47th Battalion, serving until the end of the war, and playing in several army football teams in New Guinea.

Treasure rejoined South Fremantle for the 1946 season. He played mainly as a half-back flanker, gaining selection in the Western Australian state team in 1949. Treasure finished second in the 1951 Sandover Medal to West Perth's Fred Buttsworth, won South Fremantle's best and fairest and was again selected in the state team. He was elected captain of South Fremantle for the 1954 season, serving in that role until the end of the 1955 season, when he accepted a position as playing coach of the Coolamon Rovers Football Club in the South Western District Football League (SWDFL) in New South Wales. Treasure returned to South Fremantle for the 1957 season, retiring at the end of the season. In total, he played 254 games for South Fremantle, at the time a club record.

Treasure accepted a position as coach of the Meckering Football Club in the Avon Football Association (AFA) in 1958, winning a premiership in his first season. He returned to Fremantle in 1961, and held various positions at South Fremantle, including selector and property manager. His son, Frank Treasure, Jr., played 61 games for South Fremantle from 1974 to 1977.

Treasure died of mesothelioma in April 1998, aged 73. He was inducted into the Fremantle Football Hall of Legends in 1998, and into the West Australian Football Hall of Fame in 2010.
