= Victor Carlson =

Australian rules footballer and cricketer

Personal information
- Full name: Victor Charles Carlson
- Born: 16 July 1893; Adelaide, South Australia
- Died: 23 February 1974 (aged 80); Perth, Western Australia
- Original team: Wentworth

Playing career^{1}
Years	Club	Games (Goals)
1914–1923	East Fremantle	99 (33)
- ^{1} Playing statistics correct to the end of 1923.

Victor Charles Carlson (16 July 1893 – 23 February 1974) was an Australian sportsman who played Australian rules footballer with East Fremantle in the West Australian Football League (WAFL) and first-class cricket with Western Australia.

Carlson spent his early childhood in Adelaide and almost died at the age of six following an incident with a train. He had been sitting in a cart beside a shop when the horse became uncontrollable and backed onto railway tracks, just as a train was approaching. The train ran over the cart and Carlson was thrown out upon impact. With only a minor scalp wound, Carlson was later found safe under the train after it had stopped.

Now living in Western Australia, Carlson captained Wentworth, a junior club in Fremantle, before joining Easts. He was a wingman in East Fremantle's 1914 premiership team and also played in their 1918 premiership side, as a centre half back.

He was also a leading district cricketer and represented Western Australia in three first-class matches. Playing as a right handed top order batsman, he could only make 14 runs in his five innings. This included a pair against Victoria at the Fitzroy Cricket Ground, when he opened the batting and was bowled by Bert Ironmonger in each innings.

== See also ==
- List of Western Australia first-class cricketers
