= 1953 WANFL season =

Australian rules football season

- Teams: 8
- Premiers: South Fremantle; 7th premiership
- Minor premiers: South Fremantle; 7th minor premiership
- Matches played: 88

The 1953 WANFL season was the 69th season of senior football in Perth, Western Australia.

== Ladder ==
1953 ladder
Pos	Team	Pld	W	L	D	PF	PA	PP	Pts
1	South Fremantle (P)	21	19	2	0	2589	1390	186.3	76
2	West Perth	21	18	3	0	2309	1526	151.3	72
3	Perth	21	14	7	0	1956	1880	104.0	56
4	East Fremantle	21	9	12	0	1647	1838	89.6	36
5	East Perth	21	8	13	0	1594	1906	83.6	32
6	Swan Districts	21	7	14	0	1589	1845	86.1	28
7	Claremont	21	7	14	0	1474	1745	84.5	28
8	Subiaco	21	2	19	0	1276	2304	55.4	8

Source: WAFL Footy Facts
Rules for classification: 1) points; 2) percentage; 3) number of points for.
(P) Premiers

== Grand final ==
1953 WANFL Grand Final
Saturday, 10 October (12:00 pm)	South Fremantle	def.	West Perth	Subiaco Oval (crowd: 34,207)
4.2; 8.6; 14.10; 18.12 (120)	Q1; Q2; Q3; Final	3.3; 3.6; 5.10; 8.13 (61)	Umpires: Frank Wood; Simpson Medal: Steve Marsh (South Fremantle)
