= Jack Rocchi =

Australian rules footballer, born 1904

Personal information
- Full name: John Rocchi
- Born: 21 December 1904; Boulder, Western Australia
- Died: 25 November 1979 (aged 74); Perth, Western Australia
- Original team: Boulder City
- Height: 168 cm (5 ft 6 in)
- Weight: 66 kg (146 lb)

Playing career^{1}
Years	Club	Games (Goals)
1926–29	South Fremantle	63 (-)
1931	Fitzroy	4 (0)
- ^{1} Playing statistics correct to the end of 1931.

John Rocchi (21 December 1904 – 25 November 1979) was an Australian rules footballer who played for South Fremantle in the WAFL and Fitzroy in the VFL.

Originally from the Goldfields, Rocchi started his WAFL career at South Fremantle and became their first ever Sandover Medal winner in 1928. He was a dual best and fairest winner at South Fremantle. A rover and one of the smaller players in the league, he was recognised for his sportsmanship, the dare of his play, his cleverness and the quality of his kicking and passing. He suffered a knee injury in the 1929 semi-final, which resulted in his missing the entire 1930 season.

Rocchi was recruited to Fitzroy after he had impressed during an interstate appearance for West Australia against Victoria. He moved to Victoria in February 1931, and after the three month residential qualification period received his permit to play for Fitzroy – although not before a permit committee meeting in which delegates tried to argue over which date his ship had entered Victorian waters to get his qualification passed a week earlier. But he continued to be troubled by injury, and was restricted to just four games that season. He sought but was denied a clearance to Carlton in 1932, and never played top level senior football again.

Rocchi later served in the Royal Australian Air Force during World War II.
