= Mal Brown =

Australian rules footballer and coach

Personal information
- Full name: Malcolm Gregory Brown
- Born: 26 October 1946 (age 80)
- Height: 187 cm (6 ft 2 in)
- Weight: 97 kg (214 lb)

Playing career^{1}
Years	Club	Games (Goals)
1965–1973	East Perth	166 (254)
1974	Richmond	14 (25)
1975–1976	Claremont	12 (21)
1977	South Fremantle	10 (9)
Total		202 (299)

Representative team honours
Years	Team	Games (Goals)
1966–1973	Western Australia	16 (20)

Coaching career^{3}
Years	Club	Games (W–L–D)
1970–1973	East Perth	91 (61–30–0)
1973, 1981–82, 1988	Western Australia	8 (4–4–0)
1975–76	Claremont	
1978–1984; 1992	South Fremantle	182 (119–62–1)
1985–1987	Perth	65 (25–39–1)
- ^{1} Playing statistics correct to the end of 1977.^{3} Coaching statistics correct as of 1992.

Career highlights
- Sandover Medallist 1969; All-Australian captain 1972

Malcolm Gregory "Mal" Brown (born 26 October 1946) is a former Australian rules footballer in the Victorian Football League and West Australian National Football League. He is described as "one of the most colourful and controversial characters" of the game.

He was a highly controversial character not only for his many visits to the tribunal during his playing career but also for a number of incidents when coaching as well.

== Career ==
Brown played in the WAFL (West Australian Football League ) for East Perth, Claremont and South Fremantle. His honours as a player include the Sandover Medal in 1969 and three best and fairests at East Perth (1969, 70, 72).

He was made captain/coach of East Perth in 1970 and in this capacity he led them to their 1972 premiership. At the celebrations after the game as captain he was invited to drinks with the club hierarchy. Upon requesting that the rest of the team be able to join them, and being denied, he hence took the team to the nearby Norwood Hotel for their own celebration, to the displeasure of the club president, F.D. Book.

The end of this season also saw him lead East Perth as they competed in the 1972 Championship of Australia. In a match against Carlton he got into several fights taking a dislike to their treatment of some of his team mates.

Brown moved to play in the VFL with the Richmond Football Club for the 1974 season. This earned him recognition in Victoria, where he was considered a highly controversial character. He played 14 games and booted 25 goals as a ruck-rover for the Tigers, but did not play in the 1974 Grand Final due to suspension for throwing the ball at an umpire.

He returned to Western Australia in 1975 and was appointed the player-coach for Claremont. He was banned from holding an official position with the club in 1976 after he sent a previously replaced player back out on the field, before interchange players were allowed, and he was replaced as coach by Graham Moss in 1977.

He moved to play and coach at South Fremantle, the club he supported as a child, and after retiring as a player during 1977, he coached South to a premiership in 1980.

In 1985, after eight years in charge at South Fremantle, he moved to coach Perth. He stayed there for 3 years before retiring to join the WAFL Commission. He returned to coach South Fremantle for one more year in 1992 before retiring from coaching for the last time.

In 1994 he co-authored a book titled Mal Brown & Mongrels I've met! with Brian Hansen.

He was a regular panelist on The Footy Show

In 2004, Brown was inducted into the West Australian Football Hall of Fame.

== Personal life ==
Brown is the father of former Hawthorn and Gold Coast Suns player Campbell.
