= Associated and Catholic Colleges of Western Australia =

== Associated & Catholic Colleges of Western Australia (ACC) ==
Established in 1937, the ACC is an independent secondary schools sports association based in Perth, Western Australia.

The ACC has a membership of over 82 schools catering to more than 50,000 students. Member schools compete during the year in participation carnivals, weekly summer and winter interschool sports, major carnivals in swimming, athletics and cross country and through selection in elite representative teams. There are currently five sub-associations within the ACC; NAS, CAS, NWAS, SAS, SASJ. Sub-associations conduct their own regular weekly sporting competitions.

The motto of the association is "Sport in the Right Spirit".
