= Cliff Hillier =

Australian rules footballer

Personal information
- Full name: Clifford Hillier
- Born: 27 July 1932

Playing career^{1}
Years	Club	Games (Goals)
1951–1960	South Fremantle	160 (39)
- ^{1} Playing statistics correct to the end of 1960.

Cliff Hillier (born 27 July 1932) is a former Australian rules footballer who played 160 games with South Fremantle in the West Australian National Football League (WANFL).

Hillier was used mostly in the key positions, including centre half forward and centre half back but could also play as a centreman. He was a member of South Fremantle's run of three successive premierships from 1952 to 1954. At the 1956 Perth Carnival, Hillier performed well for Western Australia and was awarded with selection in the All-Australian team. He won a best and fairest at South Fremantle in 1959, his second last season.
