= Steve Marsh (footballer) =

Australian rules footballer (1924–2024)

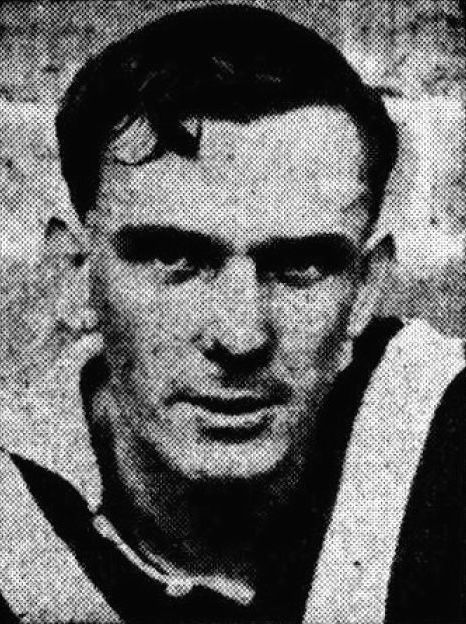
- Marsh, c. 1945

Personal information
- Full name: Stephen William Marsh
- Born: 12 September 1924; Kalgoorlie, Western Australia, Australia
- Died: 5 March 2024 (aged 99)
- Original team: Kalgoorlie Railways (GNFL)
- Height: 5 ft 6 in (167 cm)
- Weight: 11 st 0 lb (70 kg)
- Position: Rover

Playing career^{1}
Years	Club	Games (Goals)
1945–1956	South Fremantle	226 (418)
1957–58, 1960	East Fremantle	39 (51)
Total		265 (469)

Representative team honours
Years	Team	Games (Goals)
1946–1954	Western Australia	19

Coaching career
Years	Club	Games (W–L–D)
1957–1958, 1960–1961	East Fremantle	92 (60–31–1)
- ^{1} Playing statistics correct to the end of 1960.

Career highlights
- South Fremantle premiership player 1947, 1948, 1950, 1952, 1953, 1954; South Fremantle fairest and best 1950, 1952, 1956; Sandover Medallist 1952; Simpson Medallist 1953; Western Australia captain 1954; East Fremantle premiership captain-coach 1957; All-Australian selection at the 1953 Adelaide Carnival

Stephen William Marsh (12 September 1924 – 5 March 2024) was an Australian rules footballer who represented South Fremantle and East Fremantle in the West Australian National Football League (WANFL) during the 1940s and 1950s.

Marsh is regarded as one of the finest rovers of his era. He was famed for his drop kicks to position.

== Life and career ==
Born in Kalgoorlie, Western Australia, Marsh first played with the Kalgoorlie Railways Football Club, contributing in their 1943 premiership win. He was on leave from the Air Force at the time. He then arrived in Fremantle before the 1945 WANFL season and upon arriving at Fremantle Oval, he was invited into the South Fremantle Football Club rooms first, so chose to play for them, rather than East Fremantle who also trained at the same oval. The commonly recited myth that he accidentally entered the wrong rooms is incorrect.

Here he played 226 games over 12 seasons, which included being a player in six premiership teams (1947, 1948, 1950, 1952, 1953 and 1954). South Fremantle made the finals in all the twelve years he played with the club. He won the Simpson Medal as best on ground in the club's 1953 grand final win. He was the winner of the 1952 Sandover Medal as the league's best and fairest and won the South Fremantle Fairest and Best award three times (1950, 1952, 1956). He was also a member of the inaugural All-Australian Team in 1953.

Somewhat controversially he moved to East Fremantle Football Club in 1957 as captain/coach for two years on the then unheard of fee of £300. He was captain/coach of East Fremantle's 1957 premiership win. He played 39 games for East Fremantle and in 1960, having amassed a career total of 284 games, he retired as a player.

Marsh played 19 games for Western Australia, and was captain of the side in 1954.

His impact as a player and motivator was reinforced emphatically in 1957 with the new captain-coach leading the East Fremantle Sharks to their first flag in 11 years on his way to receiving a premiership pay 'bonus', while his former club South Fremantle missed the finals for the first time since the end of World War II.

His vocal playing characteristic however may have cost him some personal glory. During his career Marsh only won a single Sandover Medal, but fellow Hall of Fame member John Todd opined that Marsh's fondness for backchatting umpires probably cost him a couple of medals. Marsh himself is on record as stating that he did not lead the South Fremantle Bulldogs during their golden era because "I had too big a mouth to be captain".

Marsh died on 5 March 2024, at the age of 99.

== Awards and honours ==
Marsh was made an inaugural member of the Fremantle Football Club's Fremantle Football Hall of Legends in 1995. He was inducted to the Hall of Fame at the South Fremantle Football Club in 2011 and elevated to Legend status in 2015.

In 2005, he was elevated to Legend Status in the West Australian Football Hall of Fame. He is also a member of the Western Australian Institute of Sport Hall of Champions.

In June 2006, he was inducted into the Australian Football Hall of Fame in the player category.

The Steve Marsh Entrance to Subiaco Oval is named in his honour. Marsh Close, a street in the Fremantle suburb of O'Connor, is also named in his honour.

== Bibliography ==
- East, Alan (September 2006). The Sandover Medal Men. Alan East. ISBN 0-9775813-0-6.
