= Clive Lewington =

Australian rules footballer (1920–1989)

Personal information
- Full name: Clive William Lewington
- Born: 28 February 1920; South Fremantle, Western Australia
- Died: 23 October 1989 (aged 69); Subiaco, Western Australia
- Position: Centre

Playing career^{1}
Years	Club	Games (Goals)
1939–41, 1946–51, 1953	South Fremantle	182 (53)

Representative team honours
Years	Team	Games (Goals)
1947–49	Western Australia	5 (2)

Coaching career
Years	Club	Games (W–L–D)
1950–1958	South Fremantle	201 (142–58–1)
1964	West Perth	21 (11–10–0)
- ^{1} Playing statistics correct to the end of 1953.

Career highlights
- Sandover Medal – 1947; Simpson Medal – 1950; WANFL premiership player – 1947, 1948, 1950; WANFL premiership coach – 1950, 1952, 1953, 1954

Clive William Lewington (28 February 1920 – 23 October 1989) was an Australian rules footballer who played with and coached South Fremantle in the WANFL. He made 182 senior appearances for his club, from his debut in 1939 and is a member of the West Australian Football Hall of Fame and the Fremantle Football Hall of Legends.

== Football career ==
Lewington played most of his football for South Fremantle in the years following World War II and was used as a centreman. He won a Sandover Medal in 1947 and finished the year in South Fremantle's premiership team, the first of three premierships he would play in. The last came in 1950 when he was a Simpson Medallist for his effort in the Grand Final. He also won three Club Champion awards for South Fremantle during his career. A five time West Australian interstate representative, Lewington played in the 1947 Hobart Carnival.

He captained the club from his Sandover Medal winning season to 1951, the final two of those years as captain-coach. Lewingston then retired as a player but remained as coach until 1958 and steered South Fremantle to premierships in 1952, 1953 and 1954.

West Perth acquired his coaching services in 1964 but it would only be for the one season.

His older brother Neil also played for, captained and coached, South Fremantle.

=== Honours ===
In 2004 Lewington was inducted into the West Australian Football Hall of Fame.

== Military service ==
In July 1942 Lewington enlisted in the Australian Army, serving as a signalman. He was discharged in 1946.
