= Jack Sheedy (Australian rules footballer) =

Australian rules footballer (1926–2023)

- Sheedy playing for East Fremantle in 1950

Personal information
- Full name: John Cameron Sheedy
- Nicknames: "Mr. Football", "The Reverend"
- Born: 28 September 1926
- Died: 23 February 2023 (aged 96)
- Original team: Fremantle (Fremantle Ex-Scholars)
- Height: 171 cm (5 ft 7 in)
- Weight: 83 kg (183 lb)
- Position: Rover

Playing career
Years	Club	Games (Goals)
1946–1955	East Fremantle	180 (266)
1944	South Melbourne	6 (7)
1944–1946	Sydney Naval	unknown
1956–1962	East Perth	122 (183)
Total		308 (456)

Representative team honours
Years	Team	Games (Goals)
1946–1957	Western Australia	22 (24)

Coaching career
Years	Club	Games (W–L–D)
1949, 1952	East Fremantle	39 (23–16–0)
1956–1964, 1969	East Perth	223 (149–72–3)
1960–63	Western Australia	10 (2–8–0)

Career highlights
- East Fremantle captain 1949–1950, 1952, 1955; East Fremantle best and fairest 1943, 1948, 1953, 1955; East Fremantle premiership side 1943, 1946; Sydney Naval premiership side 1944; East Perth captain 1956–61; East Perth premiership side 1956, 1959; East Fremantle life member; East Perth life member; East Fremantle Team of the Century; East Perth Team of the Century (post-WW2); Fremantle Football Hall of Legends inductee 1995; Australian Football Hall of Fame inductee 2001; West Australian Football Hall of Fame inductee 2004; West Australian Football Hall of Fame Legend 2005; East Perth Hall of Fame inductee 2010

John Cameron Sheedy (28 September 1926 – 23 February 2023) was an Australian rules footballer and coach. He played for East Fremantle and East Perth in the Western Australian National Football League (WANFL) and South Melbourne in the Victorian Football League (VFL). Sheedy is considered one of the greatest ever footballers from Western Australia, also being the first player from that state to play 300 games in elite Australian rules football, and was a member of both the Australian Football Hall of Fame and the West Australian Football Halls of Fame.

Overall, he played 330 senior career matches from 1944 to 1962, kicking 480 senior career goals, and also coached 272 senior career games, with a winning percentage of 65%.

== Playing career ==
=== Early career and naval service ===
The son of A. F. "Barney" Sheedy, a former East Fremantle player and WAFL interstate representative, Sheedy attended Richmond State School in East Fremantle and Fremantle Boys' School in Fremantle, captaining both schools' football teams. He also led the school's batting averages at cricket, and later played First Grade cricket for the Fremantle Cricket Club in the Western Australian Grade Cricket competition. After leaving school, he played for Fremantle in the Fremantle Ex-Scholars competition, before making his debut for East Fremantle in the age-restricted WANFL competition in 1942. He won the Lynn Medal as the club's best and fairest in 1943, and played in East Fremantle's premiership win over Swan Districts. He enlisted in the Royal Australian Navy in March 1944, at only 17 years of age, and was immediately posted to Melbourne. He was signed by South Melbourne in the Victorian Football League (VFL), where he played six games, kicking seven goals. Sheedy's unit then went to Sydney, where he played with Sydney Naval, including in their 1944 premiership win in the New South Wales Australian National Football League (NSWANFL). He had kicked the winning goal in the preliminary final against Newtown the previous week with less than three minutes remaining in the match. He kicked 12 goals in three rounds in 1946 before he returned to Western Australia.

=== Return to Western Australia ===
Sheedy immediately made his senior debut for East Fremantle.

=== Transfer to East Perth and coaching career ===
Sheedy transferred to East Perth for the 1956 season, where he was immediately appointed captain-coach of the club.

Sheedy served as captain-coach of East Perth from 1956 to 1961, and as non-playing coach from 1962 to 1964, with one final season in 1969.

== Personal life and death ==
Sheedy worked as a clerk at the Fremantle Harbour Trust.

Sheedy died on 24 February 2023, at the age of 96.

== Legacy and honours ==
Sheedy had a reputation as one of the toughest and most violent players in the WANFL, and was suspended numerous times.

In 2001 Sheedy was inducted into the Australian Football Hall of Fame. In 2004 he was inducted to the West Australian Football Hall of Fame and in 2005 he was elevated to Legend Status.
