= Frank Jenkins (footballer) =

Australian rules footballer

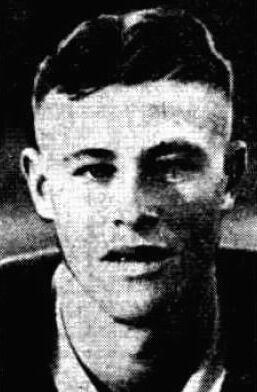

Personal information
- Full name: Frank William Thomas Jenkins
- Nickname: Scranno
- Born: 11 August 1918; South Fremantle, Western Australia
- Died: 23 May 1987 (aged 68)
- Position: Centre half-back

Playing career^{1}
Years	Club	Games (Goals)
1937–41, 1945–49	South Fremantle	150 (102)

Representative team honours
Years	Team	Games (Goals)
1938–39	Western Australia	6 (11)
- ^{1} Playing statistics correct to the end of 1949.

Career highlights
- South Fremantle premiership player: 1947, 1948; South Fremantle best and fairest: 1937-39; South Fremantle captain: 1946; Simpson Medal: 1947; Sandover Medal: 1937

Frank William Thomas "Scranno" Jenkins (11 August 1918 – 23 May 1987) was an Australian rules footballer who played with South Fremantle in the West Australian National Football League (WANFL). He is a member of the Fremantle Team of Legends.

Jenkins played 150 games for South Fremantle, mostly at centre half back but also at centre half-forward and the centre, and had his career interrupted by the Second World War. He played his best football before the war, winning the Sandover Medal in his debut season of 1937 with a record high 34 votes, which remained a record for 44 years until Stephen Michael polled 37 votes in 1981. He came close to winning back to back Sandover Medals when he finished runner up to Haydn Bunton in 1938 and also won three consecutive best and fairest awards for South Fremantle between 1937 and 1939.

After the war South Fremantle became a force and although injuries restricted him, Jenkins was named captain in 1946 and played in South's 1947 and 1948 premiership sides. He played in seven interstate matches for Western Australia and won the Simpson Medal in 1947, playing for a combined Western Australian side against Essendon.

He was born in South Fremantle and attended the Fremantle Boys' School. Following his Sandover Medal win, Jenkins was approached by three Victorian clubs, St Kilda, Footscray and Geelong to move to the Victorian Football League, but he rejected their offers to remain in Western Australia.
