= Marty Atkins =

Australian rules footballer

Personal information
- Full name: Martin Paul Atkins
- Born: 4 May 1969 (age 57); London, England
- Original team: Kwinana
- Position: Ruckman

Playing career^{1}
Years	Club	Games (Goals)
1989–2003	South Fremantle	266 (122)

Representative team honours
Years	Team	Games (Goals)
1992–2000	Western Australia	5 (2)
- ^{1} Playing statistics correct to the end of 2003 WAFL season.

Career highlights
- Simpson Medal – 1993; WAFL Premiership – 1997; WAFL Top 25 Over the Past 25 – 2012

Martin Paul "Marty" Atkins (born 4 May 1969) is a former Australian rules footballer who played for South Fremantle in the West Australian Football League (WAFL). (Note: The WAFL changed names several times during his playing career and was known variously as the WAFL (1989, 1991–1996, 2001–2003), the Western Australian State League (1990) and Westar Rules (1997–2000)) Atkins holds the record for the most WAFL matches played for South Fremantle.

== Early life ==
Atkins was born in London, England and arrived in Australia as a teenager. He attended Kwinana Senior High School.

== Playing career ==
=== Junior football ===
Atkins began playing for Kwinana at under-16 level. Making an impression as a ruckman, Atkins twice tied for club best and fairest player award, ultimately losing both times on countback.

=== South Fremantle ===
After making his WAFL league debut in 1989, he played 266 times for the Bulldogs including the 1997 premiership.

In July 2003 Atkins overtook Tom Grljusich as the South Fremantle games record holder.

=== Donnybrook ===
In 2004 Atkins joined Donnybrook in the South West Football League (SWFL) where he made an immediate impact, finishing the season as runner-up for the Hayward Medal, the league's award for best and fairest player. Between 2004 and 2007, Atkins played 65 times for the Dons.

=== Wesley-Curtin ===
Atkins was appointed playing coach of Wesley-Curtin in the Western Australian Amateur Football League (WAAFL) for the 2008 season. His form in 2009 was rewarded when he won the CJ Jamieson Medal as the best and fairest player in the WAAFL. He played until the 2010 season when he retired mid-season.

=== State football ===
Atkins played five matches for Western Australia, making his debut in 1992 against South Australia. He was awarded the Simpson Medal as best player in the 1993 clash with South Australia.

== Working life ==
In 1988 Atkins joined Western Australia Police. He spent time based in Wyalkatchem and Trayning, towns over 200 km from Perth. He returned to Kwinana Senior High School for a three-year posting as school police officer. After 15 years, Atkins left the police in 2003 to take up a role with South Fremantle as football manager. He later joined Peel Thunder as football operations manager. In early 2012 he joined Perth as CEO.
