= John Gerovich =

Australian rules footballer

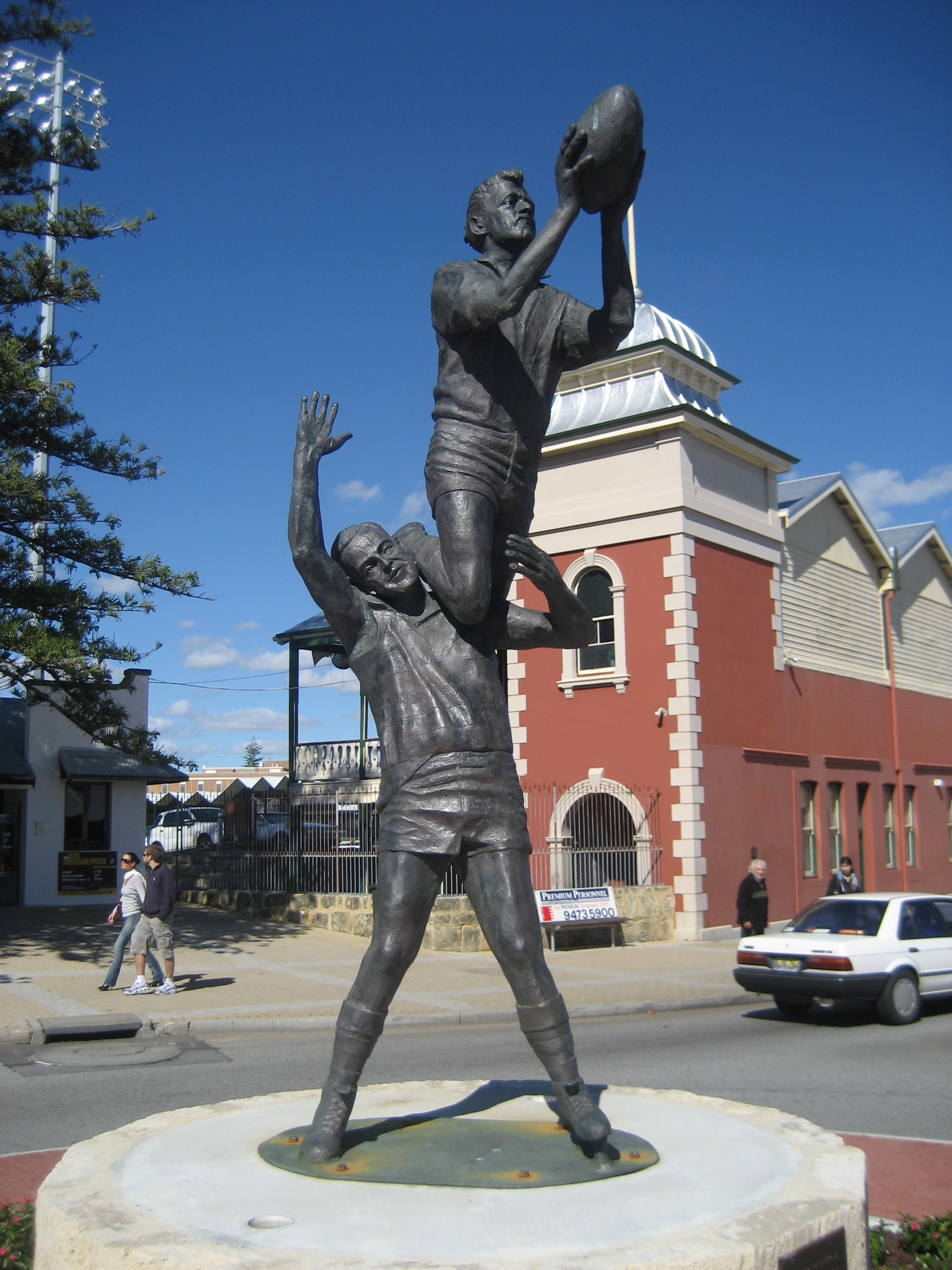
- Statue of John Gerovich's famous mark over Ray French in the 1956 WAFL preliminary final

Personal information
- Full name: John Michael Gerovich
- Born: 23 June 1938 (age 88); Spearwood, Western Australia
- Original team: Spearwood
- Position: Centre half forward / Full forward

Playing career^{1}
Years	Club	Games (Goals)
1955–1969	South Fremantle	221 (771)

Representative team honours
Years	Team	Games (Goals)
1956–1961	Western Australia	20 (56)
- ^{1} Playing statistics correct to the end of 1969.

John Gerovich (born John Mateo Gerecivich, 23 June 1938) is a former Australian rules footballer who played with South Fremantle in the Western Australian National Football League (WANFL - now WAFL) during the 1950s and 1960s.

== Playing career ==
Gerovich was a key-position forward, best known for high-flying marks and his prolific goalkicking. One famous mark, which he took in the 1956 WANFL preliminary final over East Fremantle's Ray French, is commemorated in a statue at Fremantle Oval by local sculptor Robert Hitchcock. The statue was based on an iconic photograph of the mark, taken by The West Australian photographer Maurie Hammond and published on Wednesday, 10 October 1956. The mark is also depicted in Jamie Cooper's painting the Game That Made Australia, commissioned by the AFL in 2008 to celebrate the 150th anniversary of the sport. On three occasions he was the WAFL's top goalkicker: in 1956 with 74 goals, in 1960 with 101 goals, and 1961 with 74 goals again. He also topped South Fremantle's goal-kicking tally eight times. When he retired after the 1969 season he had kicked a total of 744 goals for South Fremantle.

=== State football ===
Over the course of his career, he regularly represented Western Australia at interstate football and kicked 56 goals from his 18 representative games. Gerovich, of Croatian heritage, was an All-Australian at the 1956 Perth Carnival and played in the side which won the 1961 Brisbane Carnival.

== Honours ==
In 2004 he was one of the inaugural inductees into the West Australian Football Hall of Fame. Gerovich is also a member of the Fremantle Football Hall of Legends and a centre half-forward in the Fremantle Team of Legends, which was established in 2007. The trophy for each season's leading goalkicker at South Fremantle is named after him.
