= John Loughridge =

Australian rules footballer

Johnny Loughridge

Personal information
- Full name: John Loughridge
- Born: 14 February 1923
- Died: 4 November 1981 (aged 58)
- Original team: Mt Hawthorn
- Position: Centre

Playing career^{1}
Years	Club	Games (Goals)
1945–1950	West Perth	125 (42)
- ^{1} Playing statistics correct to the end of 1950.

John Loughridge (14 February 1923 – 4 November 1981) was an Australian rules footballer who played with West Perth in the West Australian National Football League (WANFL) during the 1940s.

Centremen John Loughridge had his best league season in 1946 when he not only won a Simpson Medal for his performance in West Perth's losing Grand Final side but he was also awarded a Sandover Medal for his efforts during the season. He had been runner up in the Sandover in 1945 and was club champion at West Perth on three occasions over the course of his career. Loughridge played in West Perth's 1949 premiership side and was also a three time state representative.

In 2002 he was named as a half forward flanker in West Perth's official 'Team of the Century'.
