= Brian Ciccotosto =

Australian rules footballer

Personal information
- Full name: Brian Bruno Peter Ciccotosto
- Born: 6 April 1948 (age 78)

Playing career^{1}
Years	Club	Games (Goals)
1967–1977	South Fremantle	211 (-)
- ^{1} Playing statistics correct to the end of 1977.

Brian Bruno Peter Ciccotosto (born 6 April 1948) is a former Australian rules footballer who played 211 games with South Fremantle in the WANFL during the 1960s and 1970s.

A rover, Ciccotosto made his debut for South Fremantle in the 1967 season. He kicked four goals in their 1970 Grand Final win over Perth and was awarded the Simpson Medal. Two years later he represented Western Australia at the Perth Carnival and was included in the All-Australian team. He played in a total of five games for his state and in the same year as the Perth Carnival topped South Fremantle's goalkicking with 35 goals.

In 1998 he was inducted into the Fremantle Football Hall of Legends, twenty years after retiring.
