= Con Regan =

Australian rules footballer

Personal information
- Full name: Cornelius John Regan
- Born: 30 September 1934; Palmyra, Western Australia, Australia
- Died: 11 May 2007 (aged 72); Vancouver, British Columbia, Canada

Playing career
Years	Club	Games (Goals)
1953–1965	East Fremantle	262 (147)

Cornelius John "Con" Regan (30 September 1934 – 11 May 2007) was an Australian rules footballer for the East Fremantle Football Club in the West Australian National Football League (WANFL) from 1953 until 1965.

He was the first East Fremantle player to play 250 games and represented Western Australia on 7 occasions, including the state's second ever National Carnival winning team in 1961. He played in the finals in every season that he played, including eight grand finals, but was only part of a successful premiership in 1957. Known primarily as a tough defender, he could also play forward, leading the East Fremantle goalkicking in 1955 with 65 goals.

After retiring from WANFL football he continued to play and coach in Katanning and Donnybrook, where he was stationed as a police officer.

He is a life member of East Fremantle Football Club, a legend in the Fremantle Football Hall of Legends, a member of both the WAFL 200 Club and the Fremantle City Hall of Fame. He was named as the full back in East Fremantle's Team of the Century in 1997. In 1995 he became the Fremantle Football Club's inaugural team manager and was awarded the Jack Titus Award in 2003 by the Australian Football League as recognition of outstanding service to football. He was also a vice-patron of the club.

Many other members of his extended family also played football and other sports in Fremantle, including former AFL players Daniel Kerr and Shaun McManus, and the women's football player Sam Kerr.

Following his death whilst on holiday in Canada with his wife Beryl, the Fremantle Football Club paid tribute to Regan by wearing black armbands and having a minute of silence before their Round 7 game against Hawthorn at Subiaco Oval on 12 May 2007.
