= Stephen Michael =

Australian rules footballer (born 1956)

Personal information
- Full name: Stephen Albert Michael
- Born: 15 March 1956 (age 70); Wagin, Western Australia
- Original team: Kojonup
- Height: 188 cm (6 ft 2 in)
- Weight: 90 kg (198 lb)
- Position: Ruckman

Playing career^{1}
Years	Club	Games (Goals)
1975–1985	South Fremantle	243 (231)
- ^{1} Playing statistics correct to the end of 1985.

Career highlights
- Sandover Medal: 1980, 1981; South Fremantle fairest and best: 1977–79, 81, 83; South Fremantle premiership: 1980; Simpson Medal: 1983; Tassie Medal: 1983; All Australian team: 1983 (Captain); Australian Football Hall of Fame: 1999; West Australian Football Hall of Fame: 2004

Stephen Albert Michael (born 15 March 1956) is a former Australian rules footballer. More recently, Stephen is the patron of the Stephen Michael Foundation, supporting disengaged, at-risk and disadvantaged youth across Western Australia.

== Playing career ==
A Noongar Aboriginal man, Michael played in the WAFL between 1975 and 1985 with the South Fremantle Football Club, playing 243 games and kicking 231 goals. He played in South's 1980 premiership side and was appointed captain in 1983. He holds the WAFL record for the most consecutive league games (217). Throughout his career, Michael resisted numerous advances by VFL clubs to move east and is often listed as one of the best players to never play in the VFL.

He was a strong, high-leaping ruckman who won the Sandover Medal in 1980 and 1981. His 37 votes in 1981 (with nine best-on-ground performances and receiving votes in 15 of the 21 games played) was a record tally under the 3–2–1 voting system in place at the time. He represented Western Australia in State or State of Origin football on 17 occasions, captaining the side 3 times. In 1983, he won the Simpson Medal for the best player in the WA vs SA game and the Tassie Medal as the best player in Australia in State of Origin football and was named captain in the 1983 All-Australian Team. He won South Fremantle's fairest and best in 1977, 1978, 1979, 1981 and 1983.

== Recognition ==
In 1995, he was named as an inaugural member of the Fremantle Football Hall of Legends. In 1999, he was inducted into the Australian Football Hall of Fame. In 2005, he was named at Centre Half-Forward in the Australian Football Indigenous Team of the Century, and in 2009 he was named in the ruck and captain of the South Fremantle Football Club's Indigenous Team of the Century. In 2008, as part of the annual NAIDOC game between South Fremantle and Claremont, the Chris Lewis–Stephen Michael Award was presented to Andrew Browne for being the best player in the match.

In May 2025, as part of the Sir Doug Nicholls Round celebrations, the AFL released a 15-minute documentary about Michael called The Western Great: The Stephen Michael Story.

== Media ==
Michael was a regular guest of the Marngrook Footy Show, broadcast on Melbourne Radio.

== Personal life ==
Stephen has 7 children: Clem, Stephen Jr., Vanessa, Cindy, Matt, Talan, Corey. Stephen's son Clem Michael also played Australian rules football for South Fremantle Football Club (including the 1997 premiership side) and Fremantle Football Club. Clem's career was cut short by a knee injury.
