= South Fremantle Football Club =

Australian rules football club

South Fremantle

Names
- Full name: South Fremantle Football Club
- Nickname(s): Bulldogs, Souths
- Motto: YES WE ARE

2025 season
- After finals: 1st
- Home-and-away season: 1st
- Leading goalkicker: Trey Ruscoe

Club details
- Founded: 1900; 126 years ago
- Colours: White, Dark red
- Competition: West Australian Football League
- President: Peter Christie
- CEO: Cameron Britt
- Coach: Craig White (2025 - )
- Captain: Chad Pearson
- Premierships: List: 15 (1916, 1917, 1947, 1948, 1950, 1952, 1953, 1954, 1970, 1980, 1997, 2005, 2009, 2020, 2025)
- Ground: Fremantle Oval (capacity: 18,000)

Uniforms
Home

Other information
- Official website: sffc.com.au

South Fremantle Football Club is an Australian rules football club based in Fremantle, Western Australia. The club plays in the Western Australian Football League (WAFL) and the WAFL Women's (WAFLW), commonly going by the nickname the Bulldogs. Since its founding, the club has won 15 WAFL premierships, the most recent of them in 2025.

Founded in 1900 after disbanding the successful but debt-burdened Fremantle Football Club (not related to the AFL Dockers entity), the club enjoyed its most successful era in the immediate decade following the end of the Second World War, winning six premierships, including a hat-trick from 1952 to 1954.

South Fremantle has a long-standing rivalry with cross-town WAFL club East Fremantle, a fixture commonly referred to as the Fremantle Derby. The club has played at its home ground, Fremantle Oval, from inception and were co-tenants with East Fremantle until 1952, when the Sharks moved to East Fremantle Oval. From the beginning, Souths adopted the club colours red and white, first adding the iconic front vee to its playing jumper in 1928.

A club with a history of over 120 years, South Fremantle does not yet boast a footballer who has played 300 or more senior League games in the red and white guernsey. The club is also recognised for its significant contribution of players who hail from Indigenous australian, Italian and Croatian heritage.

== History ==
The Fremantle Football Club (originally known as Unions and unrelated to either an earlier club and the current AFL club of the same name) had won ten premierships in the fourteen years that they were in the WA Football Association (now known as the West Australian Football League). By 1899, however, the club suffered from financial problems that caused the club to disband. The South Fremantle Football Club was formed to take their place following an application to the league by Griff John, who would be appointed secretary of the new club, with Tom O'Beirne the inaugural president. Most players, however, were from the defunct Fremantle club.

The new club did well in its first year, finishing runners-up. However, over the next three seasons the performance fell away badly and, in April 1904 a Fremantle newspaper confidently reported that South Fremantle would not appear again. However, the club decided to carry on and centreman Harry Hodge took over as skipper, but the season was a disaster. The club won only one game.

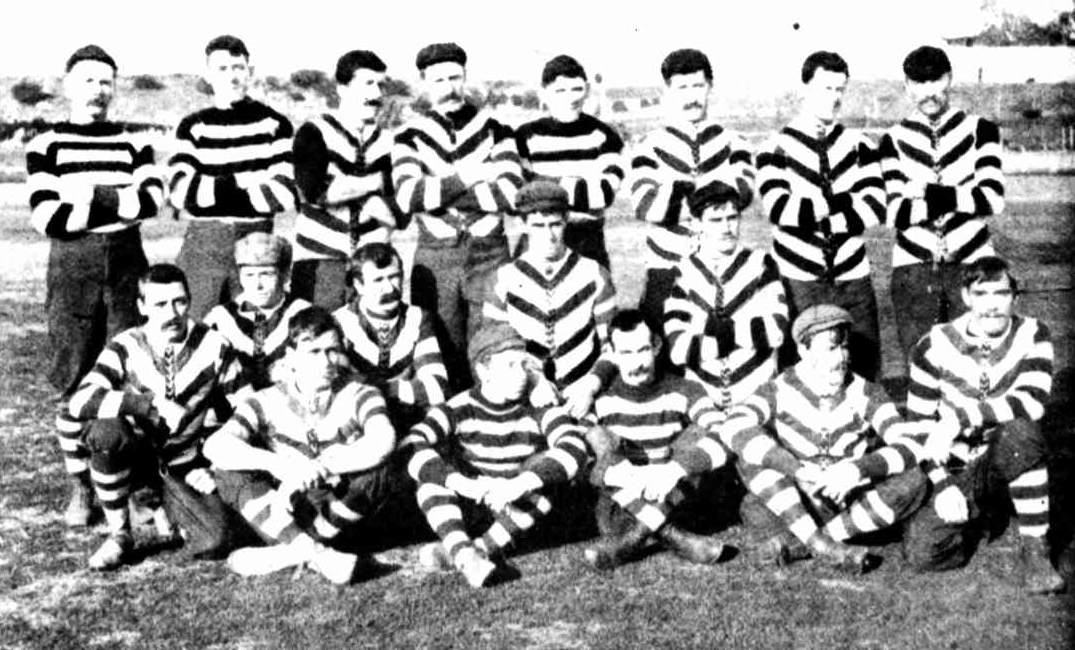
South Fremantle in 1905

They won their first premiership in 1916 and went back-to-back in 1917, both times defeating their local rivals, East Fremantle in the final and challenge final. The 1930s were not as successful, marred by the death of the 23-year-old captain-coach Ron Doig as a result of injuries sustained in a match. After World War II, South experienced their greatest era, with the arrival of future Hall of Fame members Steve Marsh, Bernie Naylor, John Todd and Clive Lewington. Between 1945 and 1956 they would win six premierships, be runners-up three times and make the finals in every season. Since then, however, they have won seven more premierships, in 1970, 1980, 1997, 2005, 2009, 2020 and 2025.

South Fremantle was the first WAFL club to have won 10 grand finals since World War II. Four of their 14 premierships were won against the club's traditional rivals, East Fremantle. The club completed a rare double in 2009, claiming both the league and reserves premierships. This was the first time the club had taken the Premiership double since 1954.

In 2020 the club received a license to field a team in the WAFL Women's league.

On the 14th of March 2023, the club was fined $25,000, deducted 8 premiership points for season 2023, received a deduction amount to their TPP of $10,525 for 2023 as well as a reduction of 10 player points for 2023.

=== Fremantle Derby ===
The Fremantle Derby, is traditionally one of the biggest game of the year on the WAFL calendar. The derbies still have a great following but have decreased in importance compared to the Western Derby, the match between WA's two AFL teams.

The Foundation Day derby on the first Monday in June (a public holiday to mark the Foundation of Western Australia in 1829) is commonly the highest attended game of the home and away season. To the end of the 2023 season the two clubs had met 389 times with South Fremantle winning 186 to East Fremantle's 199 wins, 4 Draws have occurred between the two sides.

== The club ==
=== Club guernsey & colours ===
South Fremantle's Guernsey (shown right) used for all WAFL matches is all white with a red V in the centre of the guernsey. During the 1990s they also introduced the reverse of the traditional guernsey with a white V on a red jumper. The South Fremantle colours of red & white stem from the first Fremantle based team who wore red and white in the mid-1880s.

=== Supporters ===
South hold three notable WAFL Grand Final attendance records, 1979 v East Fremantle, 52,781, the highest ever attendance at a WAFL Grand Final, 1975 v West Perth, 52,322, the second highest ever Grand Final attendance and 1989 v Claremont, 38,198, the highest ever Grand Final attendance in the post AFL period.

=== Club song ===
"We're the Bulldogs" is the theme song of the South Fremantle Football Club which is sung to the tune of "With a Little Bit of Luck", from the stage musical, My Fair Lady. The song is played as the league team comes to the field at home and away games, and after a victory.

We are the mighty Bulldogs
Always fighting on
With victory and flag our goal
With guts and determination
We put the rest to shame
Because our fighting spirit wins the game.

We're the Bulldogs (yes we are)
And we're the greatest (yes we are)
The mighty red 'V' which stands for victory
The rough tough Bulldogs (yes we are)
South Fremantle (yes we are)
The Southerners for ever more

Down by the Port of Fremantle
We hit them really hard
With true grit and courage we win
So come on Souths let's show them
How to play the game to win
South Fremantle for ever more

We're the Bulldogs (yes we are)
And we're the greatest (yes we are)
The mighty red 'V' which stands for victory
The rough tough Bulldogs (yes we are)
South Fremantle (yes we are)
The Southerners for ever more.

== Honours ==
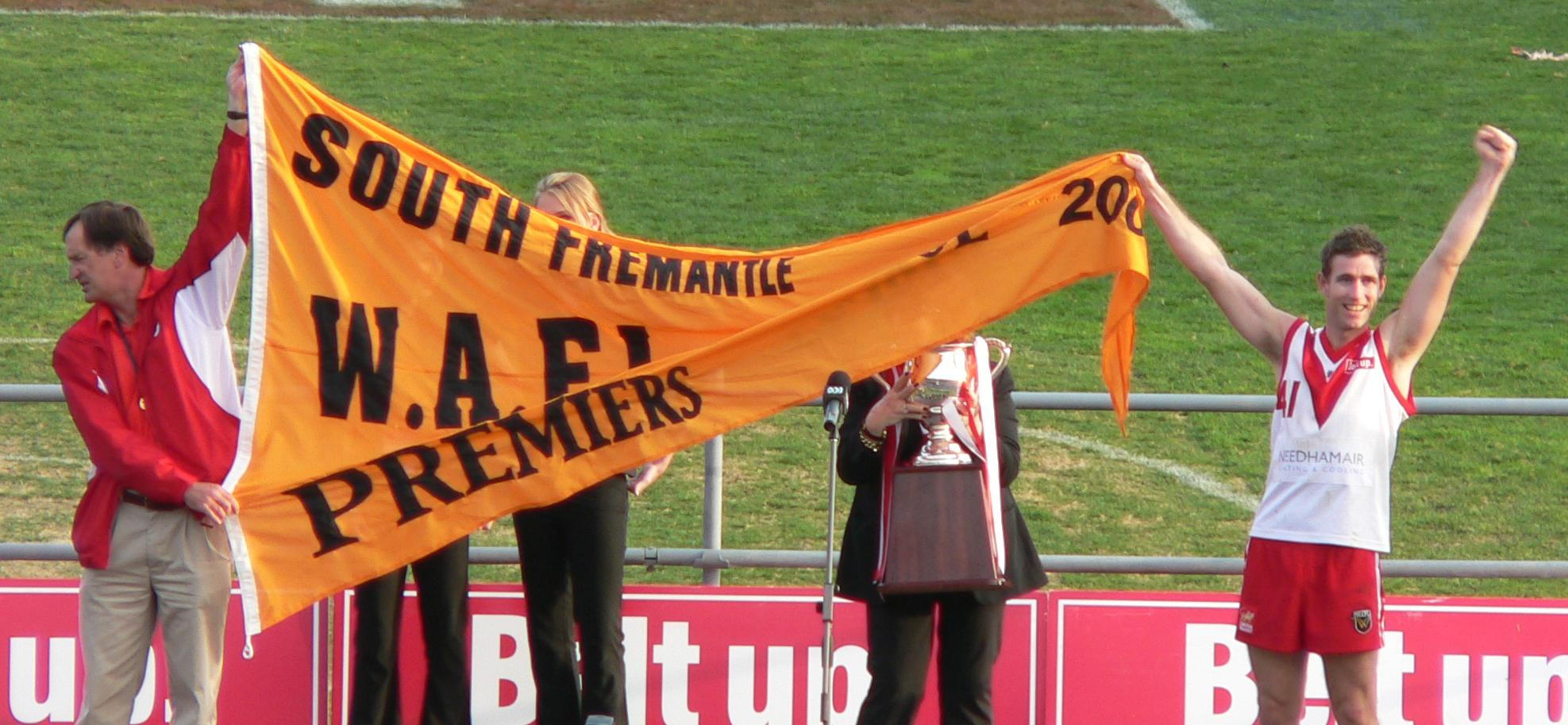
John Dimmer (coach) and David Gault (captain) celebrate after winning the 2005 WAFL Premiership.

=== Club honours ===
Premierships
Competition	Level	Wins	Years won
West Australian Football League	Men's Seniors	15	1916, 1917, 1947, 1948, 1950, 1952, 1953, 1954, 1970, 1980, 1997, 2005, 2009, 2020, 2025
West Australian Football League	Men's Reserves	12	1936, 1952, 1953, 1954, 1985, 1986, 1991, 1992, 2004, 2009, 2013, 2015
West Australian Football League	Colts (Boys U19)	9	1970, 1982, 1983, 1984, 1985, 2002, 2003, 2011, 2012
West Australian Football League	Rogers Cup (Girls U19)	2	2013, 2020
Other titles and honours
Rodriguez Shield	Multiple	6	1983, 1984, 1992, 2001, 2004, 2009, 2016
Finishing positions
West Australian Football League	Minor premiership (men's seniors)	14	1906, 1915, 1947, 1950, 1951, 1952, 1953, 1955, 1983, 1997, 1999, 2009, 2020, 2025
West Australian Football League	Runners-up (men's seniors)	19	1900, 1914, 1927, 1929, 1930, 1940, 1945, 1951, 1956, 1975, 1979, 1981, 1989, 1992, 1999, 2001, 2006, 2019, 2021
West Australian Football League	Wooden spoons (men's seniors)	12	1904, 1920, 1925, 1936, 1943, 1944, 1961, 1965, 1966, 1969, 1972, 1987
West Australian Football League	Wooden spoons (women's seniors)	2	2020, 2021

=== Individual honours ===
- Sandover medallists: (11 total) 1928: Jack Rocchi, 1937: Frank Jenkins, 1947: Clive Lewington, 1952: Steve Marsh, 1955: John Todd, 1980: Stephen Michael, 1981: Stephen Michael, 1986: Mark Bairstow, 1989: Craig Edwards, 2005: Toby McGrath, 2017: Haiden Schloithe
- Tassie Medallists: (2 total) 1983: Stephen Michael, 1984: Brad Hardie
- All Australians: (6 total) 1953: Steve Marsh, 1956: John Gerovich & Cliff Hillier, 1961: John Todd, 1972: Brian Ciccotosto, 1983: Stephen Michael 1983
- Bernie Naylor Medallists: (21 total) Harvey (Duff) Kelly (50) 1905; George (Snowy) Thomas (31) 1910; Bonny Campbell (47) 1922; Sol Lawn (75) 1928 & (96) 1929; Bernie Naylor (131) 1946, (108) 1947, 91 (1948), (147) 1952, (167) 1953, (133) 1954; John Gerovich (74) 1956, (101) 1960 & (74) 1961; Ray Bauskis (108) 1977 & (82) 1978; Craig Edwards (54) 1992; Jon Dorotich (88) 1996 & (114) 1997; Zane Parsons (65) 2002; Ben Saunders (66) 2012 & (59) 2014 & (52) 2016

== Records ==
- Highest Score: Round 21, 1981 – 40.18 (258) vs. West Perth at Fremantle Oval
- Lowest Score: Round 5, 1904 – 0.4 (4) vs. East Fremantle at Fremantle Oval
- Greatest Winning Margin: Round 3, 1999 – 195 points vs. Peel at Fremantle Oval
- Greatest Losing Margin: Round 1, 1944 – 256 points vs. East Perth at Perth Oval
- Most Games: Marty Atkins 266
- Most Goals: Bernie Naylor 1034 (1941, 1946–1954)
- Longest winning streak (league): 17 games from Round 2, 1953 to Round 18, 1953
- Longest losing streak (league): 18 games from Round 4, 1987 to Round 21, 1987
- Most goals in a season: 167 by Bernie Naylor in 1953
- Most goals in a game: 23 by Bernie Naylor vs. Subiaco in 1953
- Record Home Attendance: Round 10, 1979 – 23,109 vs. East Fremantle
- Record Finals Attendance: 1979 Grand Final – 52,781 vs East Fremantle at Subiaco Oval (also highest ever WAFL Game attendance record)

== Notable players and coaches ==
=== Australian Football Hall of Fame ===
Ten former South Fremantle players have been inducted in the Australian Football Hall of Fame. Stephen Michael was the first to be inducted in 1999. Steve Marsh and Peter Matera were both in inducted in 2006 followed by Glen Jakovich in 2008, Hassa Mann in 2013, Peter Bell in 2015, Maurice Rioli and Ray Sorrell in 2016 and Bernie Naylor in 2018. John Todd was inducted in the coaches category in 2003.

=== West Australian Football Hall of Fame ===
With the exception of Hassa Mann, each of the South Fremantle players in the Australian Football Hall of Fame is also an inductee in the West Australian Football Hall of Fame, with Marsh, Todd and Michael awarded legends status.

- Inaugural inductees (2004): Nashy Brentnall, Mal Brown, Bonny Campbell, John Gerovich, Brad Hardie, Ross Hutchinson, Frank Jenkins, Clive Lewington, Steve Marsh, Stephen Michael, Bernie Naylor, Maurice Rioli, Ray Sorrell, John Todd, John Worsfold
- 2005 Inductee: Peter Sumich
- 2006 Inductees: Peter Matera, Charlie Tyson
- 2008 Inductees: Dave Ingraham, Glen Jakovich, George Grljusich
- 2009 Inductee: Nicky Winmar
- 2010 Inductees: Mark Bairstow, Frank Treasure
- 2012 Inductee: Barry White
- 2013 Inductees: Ray Richards, Peter Bell
- 2015 Inductees: Tom Grljusich, Paul Hasleby

=== South Fremantle Football Club Hall of Fame ===
The South Fremantle Hall of Fame was inaugurated in 2011 with an initial induction of 45 players, coaches, administrators and staff from the club's inception in 1900 to 1979.

The second induction occurred in 2015, mainly covering the years up to and including 1987 (the year West Coast entered the VFL), and eight of the existing members from the inaugural intake were elevated to legend status.

The third intake occurred on 14 August 2021, with a further eight members inducted and two existing members elevated to Legend status.

There are currently 88 members in the club Hall of Fame. The current ten club legends, in alphabetical order by surname, are:

1. Brian Ciccotosto
2. John Gerovich
3. Frank Jenkins
4. Clive Lewington
5. Steve Marsh
6. Stephen Michael
7. Bernie Naylor
8. Tony Parentich
9. John Todd
10. Frank Treasure

=== South Fremantle Indigenous Team of the Century ===
During NAIDOC Week in 2009, South Fremantle celebrated their long and extensive link to Indigenous Australians by naming an Indigenous Team of the century from the 78 Indigenous players that had played for them since Jimmy Melbourne first played in 1902. Selected by former club captain and chief executive Brian Ciccotosto, premiership coach Mal Brown and journalist Ray Wilson. Four of the players selected, Stephen Michael, Maurice Rioli, Nicky Winmar and Peter Matera, were also selected in the Australia-wide Indigenous Team of the Century.

South Fremantle Indigenous Team of the Century
B:	Roger Hayden	Shannon Cox	Ashley McGrath
HB:	Willie Roe	Basil Campbell	Toby McGrath
C:	Peter Matera	Maurice Rioli	Nicky Winmar
HF:	Benny Vigona	Stevan Jackson	Dean Rioli
F:	Jeff Farmer	Mark Williams	Phil Matera
Foll:	Stephen Michael (c)	Brad Collard	Wally Matera
Int:	Cliff Collard	Clem Michael	Sebastian Rioli
Int:	Bill Hayward		
Coach:	Mal Brown		

=== Military service ===
War Roll of Honour
World War I
B. F. "Dido" Cooper †	N. F. Knox †	H. B. Porter †	J. Ramshaw †
R. T. Straughair †	H. Vagg †		
World War II
A. J. (Jack) Calder †	M. S. Haskell	D. J. C. Ingraham	C. W. Lewington
S. W. Marsh	H. J. (Harry) Matison †	J. V. Matison	K. H. McKnight †
B. G. Naylor	J. H. (Jim) Prosser †	W. F. A. Richardson	J. H. Reilly
W. A. Roach †	F. W. Treasure		
† denotes killed in action or died while serving

=== South Fremantle footballers at VFL/AFL level ===
Since the expansion of the Victorian Football League to become the national elite league in the late 1980s, numerous players from South Fremantle have represented various teams, especially the two Western Australia-based teams, West Coast and Fremantle. The list below is a summary of South Fremantle players who have achieved the highest individual honours while playing for a VFL/AFL club.

- Brownlow Medal: Brad Hardie (1985)
- Norm Smith Medal: Maurice Rioli (1982), Peter Matera (1992)
- All-Australian team: Bruce Monteath (1979), Maurice Rioli (1983, 1986), Brad Hardie (1986), Mark Bairstow (1987, 1991, 1992), Peter Matera (1991, 1993, 1994, 1996, 1997), Nicky Winmar (1991, 1995), David Hart (1994), Glen Jakovich (1994, 1995), Peter Bell (1999, 2003), Darren Gaspar (2000, 2001), Phil Matera (2003), James Clement (2004, 2005), Tim Kelly (2019)
- VFL/AFL Premiership: Colin Beard (1969), Bruce Monteath (1980), Jon Dorotich (1987), Glen Jakovich (1992, 1994), Peter Matera (1992, 1994), Peter Sumich (1992, 1994), John Worsfold (1992, 1994), David Hart (1994), Peter Bell (1996, 1999), Ashley McGrath (2003), Mark Williams (2008), Shai Bolton (2019, 2020), Marlion Pickett (2019, 2020)
