= George Grljusich =

Australian sports journalist and Australian rules footballer

- Born: George Ned Grljusich; 15 January 1939; Wiluna, Western Australia
- Died: 6 November 2007 (aged 68); Murdoch, Western Australia
- Spouse(s): Marlene Barbarich, Judy Grljusich
- Children: 3
- Presenting career
- Station: 6PR (1996–2007)
- Station: 720 ABC Perth (1960–1996)

George Grljusich

Playing career^{1}
Years	Club	Games (Goals)
1960	South Fremantle	12 (0)
- ^{1} Playing statistics correct to the end of 1960 WANFL season.

George Ned Grljusich (15 January 1939 – 6 November 2007) was an Australian sports journalist, commentator and former Australian rules footballer. Born in Wiluna, Western Australia, he played 12 games of football for the South Fremantle Football Club in the Western Australian National Football League in 1960, before quitting football to pursue a media career. Grljusich later became a radio broadcaster, commentating for Perth-based radio stations 720 ABC Perth and 6PR. He died in 2007 at the age of 68, from lung cancer.

== Education ==
Grljusich studied Law at the University of Western Australia, where he graduated in the same year as the future Chief Justice David Malcolm, Crown Solicitor (WA), Peter Panegyres and Governor of Western Australia, Malcolm McCusker, but decided to remain in the media rather than practice law. In 1977 Grljusich stood unsuccessfully for the state Seat of Cockburn.

== Playing career ==
Grljusich made his West Australian National Football League debut for South Fremantle in 1960 on the same day as his brother Tom. While Tom went on to play over 200 matches for the Bulldogs, George quit football at the end of the 1960 season to pursue a media career. Two more of his brothers also played at WANFL league level - Don for South Fremantle and John for East Fremantle.

== Media career ==
His journalistic career focused on radio sports commentary including a long running stay as the main sports announcer at 720 ABC Perth. From 1996 he worked at commercial radio station 6PR. In radio he commentated mainly on harness racing, soccer and football, as well as hosting weekly sports talkback radio, where his abrasive style often polarised his listeners.

Grljusich provided ABC coverage of six Olympic Games: 1980 at Moscow, 1984 at Los Angeles, 1988 at Seoul, 1992 at Barcelona, 1996 at Atlanta and 2000 at Sydney, as well as ten Commonwealth Games. In 2004, the media box at the Fremantle Oval was officially renamed the George Grljusich Media Box in honour of the veteran broadcaster.

In October 2007, Grljusich retired from broadcasting after being diagnosed with terminal lung cancer. He died at St John of God Hospital in Murdoch on 6 November 2007, aged 68.

In November 2007, Radio 6PR announced the establishment of The George Grljusich Sport Broadcasting Award for students of the WAAPA Broadcasting course.
