= Tom Grljusich =

Personal information
- Full name: Duje Tomy Grljusich
- Nickname: Turkey Tom
- Born: 13 August 1940
- Died: 8 June 2024 (aged 83)
- Original team: Cockburn Ex Scholars
- Positions: Key position player, ruckman

Playing career
Years	Club	Games (Goals)
1960–64, 1968–76	South Fremantle	258 (126)
1965–67	Central District	49 (77)
Total		307 (203)

Representative team honours
Years	Team	Games (Goals)
1968	Western Australia	2 (2)
- South Australia

Duje Tomy "Tom" Grljusich (13 August 1940 – 8 June 2024) was an Australian rules footballer who played for South Fremantle in the Western Australian National Football League and Central District in the South Australian National Football League. Three of his brothers played league football – George and Don for South Fremantle and John for East Fremantle.

== Playing career ==
Taking up playing football as an 18-year-old in 1958 for Cockburn Ex Scholars, he won the best and fairest award in his first year. After receiving offers from South Fremantle and East Fremantle, he joined South Fremantle before the 1959 season.

Grljusich made his league debut in round one of the 1960 season alongside his brother George. In 1965 he joined South Australian team Central District. At Central he won the club fairest and best award in 1966.

He rejoined South Fremantle in 1968, playing until 1976. His 258 games for South Fremantle stood as the club's games played record for 27 years until it was exceeded by Marty Atkins in 2003.

== Post-retirement ==
After retiring as a player, Grljusich remained involved in football, acting as a runner for then-South Fremantle coach Mal Brown. He also worked as a real estate agent.

Grljusich died on 8 June 2024, at the age of 83.
