= John Todd (footballer) =

Australian rules footballer (1938–2024)

Personal information
- Full name: John Herbert Todd
- Born: 21 May 1938; Manjimup, Western Australia, Australia
- Died: 4 June 2024 (aged 86)
- Original team: South Fremantle reserves

Playing career^{1}
Years	Club	Games (Goals)
1955–1966	South Fremantle	132 (188)

Representative team honours^{2}
Years	Team	Games (Goals)
1955–1962	Western Australia	13 (27)

Coaching career^{3}
Years	Club	Games (W–L–D)
1959, 1966–68, 1995–98	South Fremantle	172 (83–88–1)
1973–1976	East Fremantle	87 (45–41–1)
1977–87, 1990–94, 2000–02	Swan Districts	417 (217–200–0)
1988–1989	West Coast	45 (20–25–0)
Total		721 (365–354–2)
- ^{1} Playing statistics correct to the end of 1966.^{2} Representative statistics correct as of 1962.^{3} Coaching statistics correct as of 2002.

Career highlights
- Sandover Medal: (1955); 3× South Fremantle best and fairest: (1955, 1958, 1961); South Fremantle captain 1959, 1961–62; All-Australian team: (1961); 6× WAFL Premiership coach: (1974, 1982, 1983, 1984, 1990, 1997); Australian Football Hall of Fame, inducted 2003; West Australian Football Hall of Fame, Legend status 2004; South Fremantle Football Hall of Fame, inaugural Legend 2011; Swan Districts Football Hall of Fame; Swan Districts Team of the Century coach

John Herbert Todd (21 May 1938 – 4 June 2024) was an Australian rules footballer who played for the South Fremantle Football Club in the West Australian National Football League (WANFL). He also coached with success at East Fremantle, South Fremantle, Swan Districts, West Coast, and Western Australia. The only coach that comes close to John Todd in games coached is Jock McHale, who coached Collingwood. Mick Malthouse later broke McHale’s coaching record for games coached, but McHale still has won the most VFL/AFL premierships (8). Malthouse won 3 Premierships. A State Memorial service was held on 21 August 2024 for John Todd.

Todd won the Sandover Medal in his debut season at just 17 years of age, but his playing career was cut short by a serious knee injury in his second season. While still a player, Todd embarked on a coaching career that spanned over 700 games and lasted over four decades. He became only the second coach to guide three WAFL clubs (East Fremantle, South Fremantle and Swan Districts) to premierships, and led West Coast to its first finals appearance in 1988. Todd was an inaugural Legend of the West Australian Football Hall of Fame and was inducted into the Coaches section of the Australian Football Hall of Fame in 2003.

== Playing career ==
Todd first came to notice when he scored 7 goals in South Fremantle's reserve grade WAFL premiership. He made his senior debut the following year aged 16 years and 336 days, one of the youngest and played in every league game, winning both the Sandover Medal and South's best and fairest award. Aged 17 and four months when he beat Graham Farmer by four votes in the 1955 Sandover Medal count, Todd was the youngest-ever winner in open-age competition (Laurie Bowen was younger when he won the award in 1942, one of the seasons which were restricted to under age during World War II).

Five games into Todd's second season, shortly after he turned 18, a pack of players collapsed on his left leg during a match. Todd suffered a torn anterior cruciate ligament that was unable to be repaired with the medical techniques of the time. Wearing a special leg brace he was able to continue playing but only had two more seasons in his career that were not affected by injury. He won the South Fremantle best and fairest award in each of these years, 1958 and 1961 and also was selected in the All-Australian Team following Western Australia's successful 1961 Brisbane Carnival performance. Todd played a total of thirteen state games for Western Australia between 1955 and 1962, kicking 25 goals.

Todd was appointed the playing captain-coach of South Fremantle in 1959 but relinquished the position in 1960. He retired from playing in 1964 and was reappointed coach in 1966. He made a comeback to the playing field in June 1966 in the Foundation Day Derby but retired again soon after, finishing with 132 games.

== Coaching career ==
As a coach, Todd's style was generally regarded as that of the "old school" drill sergeant. While he learned to adjust his approach over time, he never compromised when it came to discipline. He was not afraid to drop or sack players, regardless of their stature, if he felt they did not meet his standards, and pushed his players to their limits on the training track to test their resolve.

=== South Fremantle Football Club (WANFL) (1959, 1966–1968) ===
Todd first coached his old club South Fremantle as a captain-coach in 1959, then after his retirement as a player, Todd returned to coach from 1966 to 1968, after which he wrote for The West Australian during the 1970 season.

=== East Fremantle Football Club (WANFL) (1973–1976) ===
Todd then crossed to rivals East Fremantle in 1973, and won his first WANFL premiership as coach in 1974. Todd the left East Fremantle Football Club at the end of 1976.

=== Swan Districts Football Club (WANFL/WAFL) (1977–1987) ===
Todd took up the coaching position at Swan Districts in 1977.

Over the course of his coaching career in the WAFL, Todd guided his teams to seven Grand finals and won six of them. Ironically, he considered the Swan District team of 1980, which lost that season's Grand Final to his old side South Fremantle, as the best team he had coached.

While at Swans in 1982, Todd caused controversy by sending a team of reserves and colts to Melbourne to compete in the Escort Cup quarter-final against VFL club Richmond. Todd's actions were in protest to a change of the quarter-final schedule, which he felt would be detrimental to his senior team's performance in the WAFL. The inexperienced team lost by 186 points, and Swan Districts was banned from the Escort Cup for two years.

=== West Coast Eagles (VFL) (1988–1989) ===
In October 1987, Todd was due to fly to Adelaide to sign with SANFL club Woodville. But the management of the fledgling West Coast Eagles in the VFL league managed to get hold of him first and secure his signature as senior coach for the 1988 VFL season after they had just sacked Ron Alexander.

One of Todd's first moves as senior coach of West Coast was to field almost two different teams: one to play at home in Perth and one to play interstate. While there would be a nucleus of key players for all the matches, Todd declared that he would pick his teams for interstate matches based on who could cope best with the different conditions. The idea seemed reasonable, based on the previous season's results; in their first year of VFL football, of the 11 games the Eagles had won, only two of them were away from home. Todd also perceived that the players had treated the interstate trips as holidays, and so he organised travel arrangements to be as short as possible, with players departing Perth late on Friday and then returning home after the game.

Todd was the first senior coach to take West Coast into the finals in the 1988 season, losing the Elimination Final to Melbourne by two points. But the side under Todd, struggled in the 1989 season where the Eagles finished eleventh on the ladder with seven wins and fifteen losses, missing out of the finals. Todd was replaced, without his knowledge, as senior coach of the West Coast Eagles at the end of the 1989 season with Mick Malthouse.

Todd coached West Coast Eagles in the VFL for a total of 45 games with 20 wins and 25 losses to a winning percentage of 44 percent.

=== Swan Districts Football Club (WASFL/WAFL) (1990–1994) ===
Todd returned to Swan Districts, taking the team to a premiership in his first year back in 1990.

=== South Fremantle Football Club (WAFL/Westar Rules) (1995–1998) ===
Todd then moved back to his original team, South Fremantle in 1995. He coached them to the 1997 premiership before leaving again after the 1998 season, taking a year off from coaching.

=== Swan Districts Football Club (Westar Rules/WAFL) (2000–2002) ===
In 2000 he made his final move, back to Swan Districts, before finally retiring at the end of 2002. In August 2001 he became the first West Australian and the fourth Australian to coach 700 senior games. The Parliament of Western Australia suspended its standing orders to pass a motion of congratulations to Todd for his contribution to Australian rules football.

=== Legacy and coaching statistics ===
In addition to his 721 league games as coach, Todd also coached Western Australia for 14 games, to take his total to 735 games. He also coached six International Rules tests for Australia.

In all, Todd coached in seven Grand Finals, winning six of them. He felt though that the one defeat was with the best team he had coached - the 1980 Swan Districts team, which won their first 13 games during the home-and-away season but lost to South Fremantle in the Grand Final.

Todd was inducted into the Australian Football Hall of Fame in 2003 as a coach and was a legend of the West Australian Football Hall of Fame.

== Death ==
Todd died on 4 June 2024, at the age of 86.

== Bibliography ==
- East, Alan; Pike, Chris; Lewis, Tracey; Stocks, Gary; Waddell, Joel (September 2006). Alan East (ed.). The Sandover Medal Men. Alan East. pp. 193–198. ISBN 0-9775813-0-6.
- Collins, Ben; Eddy, Dan (2016). Champions : conversations with great players & coaches of Australian football (3rd ed.). Docklands, Victoria: The Slattery Media Group. ISBN 9780992379162.
