= List of East Fremantle Football Club premiership teams =

The East Fremantle Football Club is the third most successful Australian Rules Football Club in Australia, having won a total of 29 West Australian Football League premierships (in the South Australian National Football League, Port Adelaide has won 35 premierships and Norwood has won 30). East Fremantle won their first premiership in 1900 but Grand Finals were not played in the West Australian Football Association until 1904. East Fremantle's last premiership was won in 2023.

== League premiership teams ==
=== 1908 ===
East Fremantle 5.7 (37) d. Perth 0.8 (8)

East Fremantle — Premiers 1908
B:	T. Wilson (c)	J.Beswick	A. Strang
HB:	James Doig	Lee	Wrightson
C:	Honeybone	S. Parsons	John Doig
HF:	R. Sweetman	Robinson	H. Sharpe
F:	D. Christy	C. Doig	Hardisty
Foll:	Hesketh	Scott	McIntyre

=== 1909 ===
East Fremantle 8.8 (56) d. Perth 4.6 (30)

East Fremantle — Premiers 1909
B:	A. Spence	J. Beswick	T. Wilson (c)
HB:	A. Wrightson	James Doig	John Doig
C:	A. Strang	S. Parsons	H. Sharpe
HF:	R. Sweetman	H. Lee	Chas Doig
F:	N. Gilbert	A. Robinson	D. Christy
Foll:	Hesketh	J. Spence	W. Craig

=== 1910 ===
East Fremantle 5.5 (35) d. Perth 2.10 (22)

East Fremantle — Premiers 1910
B:	A. Wrightson	J. Beswick	E. Kellgren
HB:	James Doig (c)	John Doig	A. Spence
C:	Cleave Doig	H. Sharpe	A. Strang
HF:	H. Bailey	E. Riley	Chas Doig
F:	J. Robinson	R. Wrightson	D. Christy
Foll:			

=== 1911 ===
East Fremantle 14.12 (96) d. West Perth 7.3 (45)

East Fremantle — Premiers 1911
B:	Binns	Beswick	John Doig
HB:	James Doig (c)	C. Wrightson	Spence
C:	A. Strang	Kruger	H. Sharpe
HF:	E. Riley	Robinson	Charles Doig
F:	P. Trotter	D. Christy	M. Corkhill
Foll:	J. Hesketh	N. Wrightson	W. Craig

=== 1914 ===
East Fremantle 5.13 (43) d. South Fremantle 3.6 (24)

East Fremantle — Premiers 1914
B:	A. Strang	A. Aisbett	W. Goddard
HB:	J. Scobie	E. Riley	A. Dix
C:	H. Sharpe (c)	W. Truscott	V. Carlson
HF:	B. Burns	G. Brown	A. Rawlinson
F:	J. Hesketh	C. Doig	A. Riconi
Foll:	W. Heindrichs	J. Wrightson	W. Craig

=== 1918 ===
East Fremantle 11.8 (74) d. East Perth 8.5 (53)

East Fremantle — Premiers 1918
B:	Fowler	A. Aisbett	G. Brown
HB:	Webb	V. Carlson	J. Scobie
C:	B. Burns	W. Truscott (c)	Bell
HF:	A. Sheedy	A. Strang	A. Rawlinson
F:	L. Cinoris	Lawn	T. Gallagher
Foll:	D.Ingraham	Cain	A. Riconi

=== 1925 ===
East Fremantle 10.10 (70) d. Subiaco 6.7 (43)

East Fremantle — Premiers 1925
B:	Wicks	J. Jones	Ryan
HB:	Roche	R. Mudie	J. Baird
C:	R. Buchanan	D. Coffey	Brown
HF:	D. Woods	J. Dolan (c)	C. Jarvis
F:	Gibson	T. Gallagher	W. Truscott
Foll:	L. Cinoris	L. Richards	A. Sheedy

=== 1928 ===
East Fremantle 10.13 (73) d. East Perth 8.8 (56)

East Fremantle — Premiers 1928
B:	Ryan	J. Jones	Pearce
HB:	D. Woods	C. Jarvis	O. Gabrielson
C:	J. Laurie	D. Coffey	Clatworthy
HF:	W. James	J. Dolan (c)	L. Jones
F:	Laffin	Lethridge	Brown
Foll:	Telfer	G. Bee	Reynolds

=== 1929 ===
East Fremantle 8.22 (70) d. South Fremantle 5.9 (39)

East Fremantle — Premiers 1929
B:	Pearce	D. Woods	J. Baird
HB:	L. Richards	C. Jarvis	O. Gabrielson
C:	J. Laurie	D. Coffey (c)	R. Buchanan
HF:	G. Bee	Jones	J. Dolan
F:	Laffin	Lethridge	Rowlands
Foll:	Telfer	Kavanagh	Reynolds

=== 1930 ===
East Fremantle 12.15 (87) d. South Fremantle 9.11 (65)

East Fremantle — Premiers 1930
B:	W. James	D. Woods	J. Baird
HB:	L. Richards	C. Jarvis	O. Gabrielson
C:	R. Buchanan	Jones	J. Laurie
HF:	G. Bee	J. Dolan (c)	Butcher
F:	G. Cormack	Glass	Lethridge
Foll:	Telfer	Laffin	Reynolds
Int:	Chegwidden		

=== 1931 ===
East Fremantle 9.13 (67) d. Subiaco 7.7 (49)

East Fremantle — Premiers 1931
B:	Gabrielson	D. Woods	J. Baird
HB:	C. Jarvis	L. Richards	J. Munro
C:	Dunne	G. Bee (c)	Wright
HF:	Glass	J. Dolan	Butcher
F:	Kingsbury	McGlynn	C. James
Foll:	Telfer	W. James	Taylor
Int:	G. Cormack		
Coach:	B. Sheedy		

=== 1933 ===
East Fremantle 10.13 (73) d. Subiaco 7.7 (49)

East Fremantle — Premiers 1933
B:	C. James	D. Woods	Donegan
HB:	J. Munro	Fordham	C. Jarvis
C:	N. Doig	C. Doig	Taylor
HF:	Migro	A. Kingsbury	J. Dolan (c)
F:	McGlynn	G. Doig	Butcher
Foll:	W. James	Prosser	Reynolds
Int:	Mann		
Coach:	J. Dolan		

=== 1937 ===
East Fremantle 14.13 (97) d. Claremont 13.9 (87)

East Fremantle — Premiers 1937
B:	N. Doig	Fordham	Skeahan
HB:	J. Clark	A. Kingsbury	R. Hutchinson (c)
C:	Seubert	C. Doig	Migro
HF:	C. Briggs	E. Martiensen	McGlynn
F:	W. James	G. Doig	Mann
Foll:	Daniell	G. Wendt	Truscott
Int:	Taylor		
Coach:	R. Hutchinson		

=== 1943* ===
East Fremantle 17.15 (117) d. Swan Districts 11.11 (77)

Team: Bathurst, Bourke, Clark, Cole, Conway (c), Cumbers, Gabrielson, Hinkley, Jarvis, Johanson, Mason, Murray, Ralph, Richardson, Sheedy, Smith, Teague, Travers

Reserve: Robertson

Coach: J. Dolan

* The 1943 season was an under-19 competition due to World War II

=== 1945 ===
East Fremantle 12.15 (87) d. South Fremantle 7.9 (51)

East Fremantle — Premiers 1945
B:	Briggs	Mellows	Garrity
HB:	Haddow	Gabrielson	K. Ebbs
C:	Little	J. Conway	Jenkins
HF:	C. Strang	G. Prince	A. Ebbs
F:	McDonald	G. Doig	G. Meiers (c)
Foll:	Mann	V. Soltoggio	V. French
Int:	C. Doig		
Coach:	J. Dolan		

=== 1946 ===
East Fremantle 11.13 (79) d. West Perth 10.13 (73)

East Fremantle — Premiers 1946
B:	F. Clarke	R. Mellowship	J. Clarke
HB:	Charlie Doig (c)	K. Ebbs	D. Gabrielson
C:	D. Conway	B. Beccaria	H. Jeffreys
HF:	C. Briggs	J. Conway	J. Green
F:	J. "Runty" Mc Donald	G. Prince	J. Sheedy
Foll:	A. Ebbs	S. Soltoggio	V. French
Int:	D. Needham	P. Scorer	
Coach:	J. Dolan		

=== 1957 ===
East Fremantle 10.18 (78) d. East Perth 9.8 (62)

East Fremantle — Premiers 1957
B:	M. Cowan (c)	F. Coulson	P. Johnson
HB:	W. Onions	C. Regan	G. Mavor
C:	F. Conway	T. Guthrie	W. Waters
HF:	B. Lawrence	N. Rogers	R. Howard
F:	R. Lawrence	K. Holt	L. Anderson
Foll:	J. Clarke	A. Preen	S. Marsh
Int:	L. Nugent	D. Anderson	
Coach:	S. Marsh		

=== 1965 ===
East Fremantle 18.18 (126) d. Swan Districts 16.6 (102)

East Fremantle — Premiers 1965
B:	T. Stevenson	T. Sprigg	F. Coulson
HB:	K. Holt	N. Rogers	L. House
C:	D. Cormack	H. Neesham	B. Biffin
HF:	L. Watson	F. Lewis	M. Regan
F:	T. Casserly	R. Johnson (c)	H. Bentley
Foll:	D. Imrie	B. Thornley	J. Martinson
Int:	N. Dedman	D. Lang	
Coach:	R. (Bob) Johnson		

=== 1974 ===
East Fremantle 17.20 (122) d. Perth 15.10 (100)

East Fremantle — Premiers 1974
B:	J. Grljusich	E. Donnes	B. Becu
HB:	K. Coates	D. Green	R. Bentley
C:	C. Hicks	G. Gibellini	T. Micale
HF:	N. Avery	G. Durnthaler	B. Peake
F:	A. Reid	P. Nicholls	T. Buhagiar
Foll:	N. Ferguson	D. Hollins	G. Melrose (c)
Int:	K. Williams	R. McHenry	
Coach:	J. Todd		

=== 1979 ===
East Fremantle 21.19 (145) d. South Fremantle 16.6 (102)

East Fremantle — Premiers 1979
B:	A. Purser	R. Crouch	M. Dobson
HB:	M. Carrott	D. Green	P. LeCras
C:	R. Lester-Smith	S. Green	J. Sims
HF:	M. Turco	J. Sewell	W. Cormack
F:	K. Judge	I. Thomson	K. Taylor
Foll:	G. Carter	B. Peake (c)	T. Buhagiar
Int:	R. Johnson	G. Kickett	
Coach:	B. Smith		

=== 1985 ===
East Fremantle 15.12 (102) d. Subiaco 14.13 (97)

East Fremantle — Premiers 1985
B:	G. Christie	C. Waterson	G. Hoult
HB:	G. Wake	B. Forman	S. Green
C:	D. Rankin	R. Solin	C. Mainwaring
HF:	P. Wilson	A. Lockyer	B. Peake
F:	R. Alexander (c)	C. Browning	M. Turco
Foll:	P. Harding	G. Neesham	M. Wrensted
Int:	R. Kerr	W. Jones	
Coach:	R. Alexander		

=== 1992 ===
East Fremantle 12.19 (91) d. South Fremantle 9.13 (67)

East Fremantle — Premiers 1992
B:	D. Capewell	C. Browning	M. Amaranti
HB:	B. Krummel	B. Read	S. Moss
C:	C. Anderson	T. Nichols	P. Davidson
HF:	N. Lester-Smith	D. Condon	P. Quill
F:	B. Krakouer	A. Lockyer	J. Davidson
Foll:	I. Newman	S. Malaxos (c)	S. Bilcich
Int:	J. Lawrence	C. Treleven	
Coach:	K. Judge		

=== 1994 ===
East Fremantle 13.13 (91) d. Claremont 10.10 (70)

East Fremantle — Premiers 1994
B:	G. Davies	D. Condon	M. Amaranti
HB:	C. Treleven	P. Harding	S. Edgar
C:	J. Stagg	S. McManus	C. Pobjoy
HF:	S. Bilcich	P. Abbott	G. Dhurrkay
F:	J. Davidson	A. Lockyer	D. Capewell
Foll:	J. Sanders	S. Malaxos (c)	C. Anderson
Int:	S. Lally	C. Burrows	W. Barnden
Coach:	K. Judge		

=== 1998 ===
East Fremantle 20.10 (130) d. West Perth 13.9 (87)

East Fremantle — Premiers 1998
B:	J. Stagg	J. Kerr	S. Spalding
HB:	M. Stockden	G. Madigan	M. Collica
C:	G. Dhurrkay	M. Mellody	C. Pobjoy
HF:	S. O'Brian	E. Spalding	S. Bilcich (c)
F:	C. Kirey	D. Condon (c)	L. Willison
Foll:	G. Egan	A. Bromage	W. Roser
Int:	M. Clucas	J. Sanders	R. Bowden
Coach:	T. Micale		

=== 2023 ===
East Fremantle 12.13 (85) d. Peel Thunder 6.10 (46)

East Fremantle — Premiers 2023
B:	F. Gorringe	M. Jupp (c)	J. Cleaver
HB:	K. Baskerville	L. Bailey	C. Eardley
C:	T. Bennett	T. Joyce	F. Turner
HF:	B. Lawler	H. Dixon	L. English
F:	A. Montauban	J. Jansen	C. Legett
Foll:	R. McGuire	H. Marsh	M. Murdock
Int:	L. Marlin	J. McDonald	B. McGuire
Int:	J. Schoenfeld		
Coach:	B. Monaghan		
