= East Fremantle Football Club Hall of Fame =

Hall of Fame

Coordinates: 32°2′48″S 115°46′4″E

The East Fremantle Football Club Hall of Fame was launched on 2 July 2012 when 52 inductees were celebrated during a dinner at the East Fremantle Football Club Social Hall. Despite being the most successful team in the West Australian Football League, the East Fremantle Football Club had never had a Hall of Fame, the closest being the 1997 Team of the Century, created to celebrate the club's 100th year.

== Legends ==
In the inaugural 2012 Hall of Fame ceremony the following nine players and officials were given 'Legends' status.

- Brian Peake
- George Doig
- Jack "Stork" Clarke
- Merv Cowan
- Jack Sheedy
- John "Jerry" Dolan
- W.J "Nipper" Truscott
- Tom Wilson
- David "Dolly" Christy

== Inductees ==
The 2012 ceremony saw 52 individuals inducted, who had served the club as players, officials or volunteers. To be eligible for the Hall of Fame, inductees must have played or volunteered between 1898 and 1986.

Legends indicated in bold.

Name	Year inducted	Description	Photo
**David "Dolly' Christy**	2012	Played 196 games between 1898 and 1912. Co-founder of the East Fremantle Football Club with friend Tom Wilson. Played in 9 Premierships.	
**Tom Wilson**	2012	Played 187 games between 1898 and 1910. Co-founder of the East Fremantle Football Club with friend David Christy. Played in 7 Premierships. Club Captain between 1910-1911. Captain from 1898 to 1900 then again from 1904 to 1909.	
James "Scotty' Doig	2012	Played 225 games between 1898 and 1911, 1915. Member of 9 Premiership-winning teams.	
Charles "Dick" Sweetman	2012	Played 206 games for East Fremantle between 1898-1911. Member of 8 Premiership Sides.	
John "Hooky" Doig	2012	Played 224 games from 1899 to 1912 including 9 Premierships.	
Tom "Pop" Lewis	2012	Long-time trainer and property man for the club Tom "Pop" Lewis also served as a committee member for a total of 10 years.	
Charles Doig	2012	208 games between 1903–1915,1919,1921. Played in 8 Premierships was a state representative 7 times and the WAFL Leading goalkicker twice in 1908 and 1909. Later served as EFFC President 1924-1936.	
Harry Sharpe	2012	217 games including 8 Premierships between 1903-1917. WAFL leading goalkicker in 1905 and 1907. Also coached EFFC in 1921. Played 6 state games.	
Archie Strang	2012	Played in 7 Premiership during his 241-game career for the Sharks. Also served as a Trainer between 1928 and 1939. Played 4 state games.	
R.J. Lynn	2012	Gave considerable financial support to the Club as a patron between 1912-1928. Has the EFFC Best and Fairest, the Lynn Medal, named in his honor.	
**William "Nipper" Truscott**	2012	A club champion Nipper played 202 games and was a part of 3 Premierships during his time at East Fremantle. Captained the club 1916-1922 and also coached the club 1925-1926. Played 10 state games and is a member of the AFL Hall of Fame. A pavilion at East Fremantle Oval is named in his honor.	
Ray Mudie	2012	153 games between 1915, 1919-1929. Won three Premierships, one as a player, two as coach. Represented WA in 9 State games.	
Len Cinoris	2012	166 games and 2 Premierships between 1918 and 1928. Played 1 state game and was later awarded Life Membership to the WAFC.	
Arthur "Barney" Sheedy	2012	Played 106 games for the blue and whites from 1918–1920, 1924–1932, 1934. Won three Premierships, two as a player, one as a coach. Served as EFFC Treasurer from 1934–1946 and again in 1952. Played 6 State games for WA.	
Len Brown	2012	Played 102 games for EFFC as a forward, and saw Premierships twice while playing for the Sharks. Represented WA twice at state level and later served as EFFC Secretary from 1933-1945.	
**Jerry Dolan**	2012	Center half-forward and eventual coach Jerry Dolan played 166 games for East Fremantle from 1923-1933 winning 5 Premierships as a player. Dolan won a further 4 Premierships as a coach of East Fremantle in 1933, 1943, 1945 and 1946. The 1946 Premiership the highlight, as Dolan's side went undefeated throughout the entire season. Played 12 state games and coached the WA state side from 1946-1949.	
Jack "Skinny" Baird	2012	Jack "Skinny" Baird's 176-game career included 4 Premierships. Played only one state game but served the EFFC as a Committee Member from 1934–1937 and as a Property man/Bootstudder from 1935-1973.	
Dave Woods	2012	Known for his long kicking Woods played 197 games for East Fremantle between 1923-1935 winning 6 Premierships in the process. Represented WA in 13 state games being an automatic selection at fullback.	
Carlisle "Bub" Jarvis	2012	"Bub" Jarvis won a Lynn Medal and 6 Premierships in his 163-game career for East Fremantle from 1924-1936. A member of the WA Football Hall of Fame, Jarvis played seven state games.	
Roy "Skeeter" McGlinn	2012	A pacey forward, McGlinn played 190 times for East Fremantle between 1931–1940, winning three Premierships and playing five state games.	
Charles Doig, Jr.	2012	Charles Doig Jnr. could play in any position during his 196-game career for East Fremantle. Doig Jnr. won 4 Premierships during his time at East Fremantle and was the captain of the undefeated 1946 Premiership side. He later served on the EFFC committee from 1953-1955.	
**George Doig**	2012	Full forward George Doig was 175 cm tall and weighed 74 kg. Doig kicked 1,097 goals in 202 games for East Fremantle and was dubbed 'the Bradman of WAFL Football' by a Sydney newspaper in 1938. In just 14 state games for WA, Doig kicked 62 goals. Had the Second World War not interrupted his career, Doig's goal-kicking record would have been even more impressive.	
Allan Ebbs	2012	Another player who had his career cut short by World War Two, Ebbs played 128 games in 8 seasons with East Fremantle. Ebbs won the Lynn Medal in 1946 as well as the Simpson Medal in the 1946 Grand Final.	
Don Gabrielson	2012	Known around the club as 'Gabbo', Gabrielson played 183 games for the Sharks from 1938–1941,1945-1951. Gabrielson won two Premierships with East Fremantle in 1945 and 1946 and also played two state games.	
George Prince	2012	Played 225 games in the blue and white from 1939–1941,1945-1952 including two Premierships in 1945 and 1946. Was a renowned goalkicker and won the Lynn Medal in 1947. Played 8 state games for WA.	
Vic French	2012	Rover Vic French played 188 games for Old Easts from 1940–1941, 1945-1952 during a career interrupted by war. French won two Premierships and three Lynn Medals and represented the Black Ducks four times during his career.	
Charlie Lundgren	2012	While Lundgren only played 24 games, he played in the 1946 Premierships side. Lundgren then went on to serve as club Treasurer for 32 years from 1952-1982.	
**Jack Sheedy**	2012	Jack Sheedy played 210 games for Old Easts from 1942–1944, 1946-1955. Sheedy went on to coach Easts twice in 1949 and 1952 and won four Lynn Medals. Sheedy played 18 state games and was a Club Patron from 1990-2005.	
Jim Conway	2012	Forward Jim Conway played 180 games for East Fremantle from 1943,1946–1953, 1955, 1956 winning the Lynn Medal in 1950. Conway won two Premierships with the Sharks in 1943 and 1946 and won the Sandover Medal in 1950. Played 17 state games for Western Australia.	
Ken Ebbs	2012	Ebbs played 159 games for Easts from 1945-1956, winning the Lynn Medal in 1949. Ebbs represented WA on four occasions and won the 1945 and 1946 Premierships with the Sharks.	
Harold Jefferys	2012	Jefferys won the Lynn Medal in 1952 and a Premiership in 1946. Played 155 games between 1946-1953 usually at fullback. Played 4 state games.	
Bob Hicks	2012	Bob Hicks was a half back who played 204 games between 1948-1960 and represented WA in 5 state games. He became a commentator in later life, calling games alongside John K. Watts.	
Merv Cowan	2012	Merv Cowan played 169 games for the Sharks between 1948-1957. A Premiership player in 1957, Cowan served as EFFC secretary from 1960–1964 and as President from 1970-1982. The Merv Cowan Stand at East Fremantle Oval is named in his honor.	
Ray French	2012	Ray French, a rover, moved to East Fremantle to play alongside brother Vic, Ray French played 194 games in 12 season at East Fremantle. French played one state game for WA.	
Percy Johnson	2012	Playing across the half forward line Percy Johnson played 198 games for East Fremantle from 1951–1958, 1962, including the 1957 Premiership. Represented the state 9 times.	
**Jack "Stork" Clarke**	2012	Jack "Stork' Clarke played 206 games for the Old Easts in a career that spanned 11 seasons. Clarke won three Lynn Medals in 1956, 1960 and 1961 and was a State Representative 25 times. Clark was selected as an All Australian on 4 occasions and won the 1957 Sandover Medal, the same year Easts won the flag.	
Wilson Onions	2012	Wilson Onions is known for his white-line-fever. He played 101 games for East Fremantle including the 1957 Premiership. Onions currently volunteers for the Past Players and Officials Association. Onions served as their President for over 40 years, 1962-2004.	
Con Regan	2012	With the ability to play back or forward, Con Regan played 262 games for East Fremantle from 1953-1965 winning the 1957 Premiership along the way. A strong player, Regan was the club's leading goalkicker in 1955 and 1962 and played 9 state games for WA.	
Frank Coulson	2012	Plated exactly 200 games for the Blue and Whites from 1954-1966. Frank Coulson played in two Premierships for the Sharks in 1957 and 1965.	
Ken Holt	2012	A high flying center half forward, Ken Holt played 202 games for East Fremantle and played in two Premierships during his 10 year career. Was the club's leading goalkicker in 1961 and played 1 state game.	
Ray "Oscar" Howard	2012	Ray "Oscar" Howard's last-minute goal in the 1957 Preliminary Final helped the club to the 1957 Grand Final and eventually Premiership. He played 157 games for East Fremantle from 1955-1963. Howard played 4 state games during his career and later served as a Director of the Club from 1986 to 2002 and was Vice-President from 1991 to 1999.	
Len Anderson	2012	A club stalwart, Len Anderson had a 108-game career which included the 1957 Premiership. A goalkicker, Andreson quickly established himself in the side leading the Sharks goalkicking from 1957 to 1960. Played one state game in his career and later served as a director from 1983 to 2004 and vice president from 1987 to 2004. Anderson now spends his time as the team manager of the East Fremantle Colts side.	
Norm Rogers	2012	A veteran of 234 games, Norm Rogers won the 1959 Lynn Medal and two Premierships during his time at the Sharks. An All Australian in 1958, Rogers played 27 state games as a backman.	
Ray Sorrell	2012	A part of the 1957 Premiership side, Ray Sorrell was known for his stamina and speed, earning him all Australian selection in 1958 and 1961. Sorrell played 156 games for the Sharks and won the Lynn Medal twice in 1957 and 1963. Was capped 18 times by WA and won the Simpson Medal in the 1962 Grand Final which East Fremantle lost.	
Fred Lewis	2012	Fred Lewis debuted for East Fremantle in 1964 at 17 and played until 1972 amassing 155 games and a Premiership Medallion in the process. A Lynn Medal winner in 1967 Lewis played 9 state games for WA.	
Trevor Sprigg	2012	Trevor Sprigg's first year at East Fremantle was a successful one for the fullback, playing in the 1965 Premiership side. Known affectionately as "Spriggy" he won the 1968 Lynn Medal and played 5 state games during his 151-game career at East Fremantle. He later served as Club Patron from 2006–2007 and was a radio and TV commentator for quite some time.	
Graham Melrose	2012	Graham Melrose had a 140-game career with East Fremantle winning the 1974 Premiership, Sandover Medal and Lynn Medal. Melrose had already won the Lynn Medal in 1972, and in 1974, he led his team to a Premiership in not only his last game as captain but his last game in a Blue and White jumper.	
Doug Green	2012	Half back Doug Green played 181 games for the Sharks including two Premierships in 1974 and 1979. Green won the 1973 Lynn Medal and Captained the Sharks from 1975-1978. Green played 13 state games in his career.	
David Hollins	2012	David Hollins had an 11-season, 189-game career in which he won the 1974 Premiership, two Lynn Medals and the 1971 Sandover Medal in just his second season. A life member of EFFC, Hollins played 5 state games.	
**Brian Peake**	2012	A 305-game career saw Brian Peake win three Premierships, six Lynn Medals, one Sandover medal and awarded three All Australian Jackets. Was a Premiership captain in 1979 and also captained WA in his 19 state games.	
Else Park	2012	Alongside Elsie Baird, Else Park served the club as a volunteer for many years catering club functions and creating East Fremantle's half time teas.	
Elsie Baird	2012	Alongside Else Park, Elsie Baird served the club as a volunteer for many years, catering club functions and creating East Fremantle's half time teas.	
