= 1931 WANFL season =

Australian rules football season

- Teams: 7
- Premiers: East Fremantle; 16th premiership
- Minor premiers: East Fremantle; 18th minor premiership
- Sandover Medallist: Lin Richards (East Fremantle)
- Leading goalkicker: Doug Oliphant (Perth)
- Matches played: 67

The 1931 WANFL season was the 47th season of the Western Australian National Football League and the first under that moniker, having been called the West Australian Football League (WAFL) until 1930.

The season saw East Fremantle win its fourth consecutive premiership for the second time, having already done so between 1908 and 1911. It also saw a major revival by East Perth, who had fallen to a clear last in 1929. The Great Depression and consequent search for work saw the beginning of the first major drain of Western Australian players to powerful VFL clubs, with the loss of George Moloney to Geelong, Ron Cooper to Carlton and Keith Hough to South Melbourne, where Hough never played a single match due to the WANFL's refusal to grant the VFL Swans a clearance.

Subiaco, a power since 1924, lost star rover Johnny Leonard to country Victoria but, despite four consecutive losses mid-season, won eight straight to reach the Second-Semi and Grand Finals only to face a much larger player drain than seen so far in the WANFL.

== Home-and-away season ==
=== Round 1 (Labour Day) ===
	Round 1
Saturday, 2 May (2:45 pm)	East Fremantle 11.14 (80)	def. by	Subiaco 15.11 (101)	Fremantle Oval
Saturday, 2 May (2:45 pm)	East Perth 17.17 (119)	def.	Claremont-Cottesloe 8.10 (58)	Perth Oval
Monday, 4 May (2:45 pm)	West Perth 14.12 (96)	def.	South Fremantle 7.10 (52)	Leederville Oval
	Bye; Perth

=== Round 2 ===
	Round 2
Saturday, 9 May (2:45 pm)	Claremont-Cottesloe 5.10 (40)	def. by	Perth 11.12 (78)	Claremont Oval
Saturday, 9 May (2:45 pm)	Subiaco 8.8 (56)	def. by	South Fremantle 8.16 (64)	Subiaco Oval
Saturday, 9 May (2:45 pm)	East Fremantle 12.19 (91)	def.	West Perth 9.4 (58)	Fremantle Oval
	Bye; East Perth

=== Round 3 ===
	Round 3
Saturday, 16 May (2:45 pm)	Subiaco 9.14 (68)	def.	Perth 4.9 (33)	Subiaco Oval
Saturday, 16 May (2:45 pm)	South Fremantle 15.18 (108)	def.	Claremont-Cottesloe 10.10 (70)	Fremantle Oval
Saturday, 16 May (2:45 pm)	West Perth 14.11 (95)	def.	East Perth 11.11 (77)	Leederville Oval
	Bye; East Fremantle

=== Round 4 ===
	Round 4
Saturday, 23 May (2:45 pm)	Perth 12.20 (92)	def.	West Perth 7.12 (54)	WACA
Saturday, 23 May (2:45 pm)	East Perth 8.5 (53)	def. by	Subiaco 7.14 (56)	Perth Oval
Saturday, 23 May (2:45 pm)	Claremont-Cottesloe 8.10 (58)	def. by	East Fremantle 12.10 (82)	Claremont Oval
	Bye; South Fremantle
Bill Faul takes a decisive mark of a long shot to win a thrilling match and leave Subiaco as the early pacesetter.

=== Round 5 ===
	Round 5
Saturday, 30 May (2:45 pm)	West Perth 12.18 (90)	def.	Claremont-Cottesloe 7.8 (50)	Leederville Oval
Saturday, 30 May (2:45 pm)	Perth 11.7 (73)	def. by	East Fremantle 17.20 (122)	WACA
Saturday, 30 May (2:45 pm)	South Fremantle 18.15 (123)	def.	East Perth 6.13 (49)	Fremantle Oval
	Bye; Subiaco
South Fremantle show they will challenge for the premiership with a fine display led by a dominant centreline where R. Doig is outstanding.

=== Round 6 (Foundation Day) ===
	Round 6
Monday, 1 June (2:45 pm)	Subiaco 11.8 (74)	def. by	West Perth 12.10 (82)	Subiaco Oval
Monday, 1 June (2:45 pm)	East Perth 13.7 (85)	def.	Perth 10.10 (70)	Perth Oval
Monday, 1 June (2:45 pm)	South Fremantle 5.8 (38)	def. by	East Fremantle 4.28 (52)	Fremantle Oval
	Bye; Claremont-Cottesloe
East Fremantle gave one of the worst displays of goalkicking in WA(N)FL history, kicking 4.28 (52) in fine conditions, but still take top position from their derby rivals.

=== Round 7 ===
	Round 7
Saturday, 6 June (2:45 pm)	East Fremantle 9.18 (72)	def.	East Perth 4.7 (31)	Fremantle Oval
Saturday, 6 June (2:45 pm)	Perth 9.15 (69)	def. by	South Fremantle 10.12 (72)	WACA
Saturday, 6 June (2:45 pm)	Claremont-Cottesloe 10.11 (71)	def. by	Subiaco 19.13 (127)	Claremont Oval
	Bye; West Perth
Despite some of the most brilliant marking seen in WA(N)FL football by centre half-back Lawn, East Perth, unable to use the wind in the second quarter, lose the advantage in the last.

=== Round 8 ===
	Round 8
Saturday, 13 June (2:45 pm)	Subiaco 10.14 (74)	def. by	East Fremantle 14.11 (95)	Subiaco Oval
Saturday, 13 June (2:45 pm)	Claremont-Cottesloe 16.8 (104)	def.	East Perth 13.9 (87)	Claremont Oval
Saturday, 13 June (2:45 pm)	South Fremantle 13.19 (97)	def.	West Perth 11.12 (78)	Fremantle Oval
	Bye; Perth
With captain-coach Gepp kicking ten goals, Claremont-Cottesloe recorded its first win of the season.

=== Round 9 ===
	Round 9
Saturday, 20 June (2:45 pm)	Perth 12.18 (90)	def.	Claremont-Cottesloe 13.9 (87)	WACA
Saturday, 20 June (2:45 pm)	South Fremantle 12.16 (88)	def.	Subiaco 9.17 (71)	Fremantle Oval
Saturday, 20 June (2:45 pm)	East Perth 11.7 (73)	def.	West Perth 9.12 (66)	Perth Oval
	Bye; East Fremantle
With Doug Oliphant kicking eight goals, Perth come back in the last quarter to record a thrilling win.

=== Round 10 ===
	Round 10
Saturday, 27 June (2:45 pm)	Claremont-Cottesloe 8.10 (58)	def.	South Fremantle 6.10 (46)	Claremont Oval
Saturday, 27 June (2:45 pm)	East Fremantle 9.25 (79)	def.	West Perth 6.11 (47)	Fremantle Oval
Saturday, 27 June (2:45 pm)	Perth 8.19 (67)	def.	Subiaco 6.11 (47)	WACA
	Bye; East Perth
On a day of heavy rain after a cold and dry June, Claremont-Cottesloe surprise South Fremantle to leave the three-time premiers three games clear on top, whilst Perth displace West Perth from the four and leave Subiaco's place in jeopardy after three straight defeats.

=== Round 11 ===
	Round 11
Saturday, 4 July (2:45 pm)	East Fremantle 11.16 (82)	def.	Claremont-Cottesloe 5.19 (49)	Fremantle Oval
Saturday, 4 July (2:45 pm)	West Perth 11.11 (77)	def.	Perth 11.9 (75)	Leederville Oval
Saturday, 4 July (2:45 pm)	Subiaco 9.12 (66)	def. by	East Perth 9.14 (68)	Subiaco Oval
	Bye; South Fremantle
A five-goal third quarter sees East Perth – seemingly out of touch at half-time – take a narrow lead from the Maroons and hold on in a goalless final quarter, with the result leaving Subiaco ahead of only Claremont-Cottesloe.

=== Round 12 ===
	Round 12
Saturday, 11 July (2:45 pm)	East Fremantle 9.20 (74)	def.	Perth 6.10 (46)	Fremantle Oval
Saturday, 11 July (2:45 pm)	East Perth 12.12 (84)	def.	South Fremantle 8.11 (59)	Perth Oval
Saturday, 11 July (2:45 pm)	Claremont-Cottesloe 9.11 (65)	def.	West Perth 8.9 (57)	Claremont Oval
	Bye; Subiaco
Claremont-Cottesloe's third and last win is marred by a severe injury to captain-coach Gepp – who continues to direct the team when being carried off.

=== Round 13 ===
	Round 13
Saturday, 18 July (2:45 pm)	South Fremantle 8.13 (61)	def. by	East Fremantle 9.17 (71)	Fremantle Oval
Saturday, 18 July (2:45 pm)	West Perth 9.8 (62)	def. by	Subiaco 16.22 (118)	Leederville Oval
Saturday, 18 July (2:45 pm)	Perth 9.9 (63)	def. by	East Perth 13.13 (91)	WACA
	Bye; Claremont-Cottesloe

=== Round 14 ===
	Round 14
Saturday, 25 July (2:45 pm)	East Perth 11.8 (74)	def.	East Fremantle 5.11 (41)	Perth Oval
Saturday, 25 July (2:45 pm)	Subiaco 12.9 (81)	def.	Claremont-Cottesloe 7.8 (50)	Subiaco Oval
Saturday, 25 July (2:45 pm)	South Fremantle 15.10 (100)	def.	Perth 11.12 (78)	Fremantle Oval
	Bye; West Perth
In a fierce match with numerous brawls on a wet afternoon, East Perth end Old Easts' run of ten victories with a superb display of skill, led by Cronin who controlled the centre and a fine defence.

=== Round 15 ===
	Round 15
Saturday, 1 August (2:45 pm)	South Fremantle 9.25 (79)	def.	West Perth 11.7 (73)	Fremantle Oval
Saturday, 1 August (2:45 pm)	Subiaco 13.10 (88)	def.	East Fremantle 10.14 (74)	Subiaco Oval
Saturday, 1 August (2:45 pm)	East Perth 16.8 (104)	def.	Claremont-Cottesloe 13.18 (96)	Perth Oval
	Bye; Perth
South Fremantle defeated West Perth despite kicking two goals fewer than its opponent, the first time this had occurred in a senior game since 1920.

=== Round 16 ===
	Round 16
Saturday, 8 August (2:45 pm)	South Fremantle 6.14 (50)	def. by	Subiaco 8.19 (67)	Fremantle Oval
Saturday, 8 August (2:45 pm)	West Perth 13.10 (88)	def. by	East Fremantle 15.19 (109)	Leederville Oval
Saturday, 8 August (2:45 pm)	Claremont-Cottesloe 11.11 (77)	def. by	Perth 15.10 (100)	Claremont Oval
	Bye; East Perth

=== Round 17 ===
	Round 17
Saturday, 15 August (2:45 pm)	Subiaco 13.13 (91)	def.	Perth 8.10 (58)	Subiaco Oval
Saturday, 15 August (2:45 pm)	South Fremantle 10.22 (82)	def.	Claremont-Cottesloe 9.11 (65)	Fremantle Oval
Saturday, 15 August (2:45 pm)	West Perth 10.12 (72)	def. by	East Perth 12.23 (95)	Leederville Oval
	Bye; East Fremantle
The top four was clearly decided with four rounds to play as a result of West Perth's loss.

=== Round 18 ===
	Round 18
Saturday, 22 August (2:45 pm)	Subiaco 13.11 (89)	def.	East Perth 13.9 (87)	Subiaco Oval
Saturday, 22 August (2:45 pm)	Perth 14.22 (106)	def.	West Perth 12.8 (80)	WACA (crowd: 300)
Saturday, 22 August (2:45 pm)	East Fremantle 23.14 (152)	def.	Claremont-Cottesloe 15.15 (105)	Fremantle Oval
	Bye; South Fremantle
Roy McGlinn kicks ten goals for Old Easts, whilst a high-class thriller between the Maroons and Royals ultimately gives Subiaco the "double chance" in the new Page System of finals.

=== Round 19 ===
	Round 19
Saturday, 29 August (2:45 pm)	East Perth 14.8 (92)	def.	South Fremantle 9.7 (61)	Perth Oval
Saturday, 29 August (2:45 pm)	East Fremantle 21.12 (138)	def.	Perth 7.8 (50)	Fremantle Oval
Saturday, 29 August (2:45 pm)	West Perth 16.11 (107)	def.	Claremont-Cottesloe 7.13 (55)	Leederville Oval
	Bye; Subiaco
Ted Tyson, later to become the second most prolific goalkicker in WANFL history, kicks nine goals for the Cardinals, leaving him level with Oliphant as leading goalkicker (though having played an extra game).

=== Round 20 ===
	Round 20
Saturday, 5 September (2:45 pm)	East Fremantle 19.14 (128)	def.	South Fremantle 10.9 (69)	Fremantle Oval
Saturday, 5 September (2:45 pm)	West Perth 10.6 (66)	def. by	Subiaco 13.16 (94)	Leederville Oval
Saturday, 5 September (2:45 pm)	Perth 11.12 (78)	def. by	East Perth 12.14 (86)	WACA
	Bye; Claremont-Cottesloe

=== Round 21 ===
	Round 21
Saturday, 12 September (2:45 pm)	Claremont-Cottesloe 9.4 (58)	def. by	Subiaco 13.16 (94)	Claremont Oval
Saturday, 12 September (2:45 pm)	East Perth 3.12 (30)	def. by	East Fremantle 17.8 (110)	Perth Oval
Saturday, 12 September (2:45 pm)	South Fremantle 9.17 (71)	def.	Perth 8.8 (56)	Fremantle Oval
	Bye; West Perth
East Fremantle kicked 9.1 (55) with the breeze in the third quarter after East Perth had kicked 0.6 (6) with it in the second.

== Ladder ==
1931 WANFL ladder
Pos	Team	Pld	W	L	D	PF	PA	PP	Pts
1	East Fremantle (P)	18	15	3	0	1652	1140	144.9	60
2	Subiaco	18	12	6	0	1462	1206	121.2	48
3	East Perth	18	11	7	0	1385	1379	100.4	44
4	South Fremantle	18	10	8	0	1320	1313	100.5	40
5	West Perth	18	6	12	0	1348	1481	91.0	24
6	Perth	18	6	12	0	1282	1460	87.8	24
7	Claremont-Cottesloe	18	3	15	0	1216	1686	72.1	12

Rules for classification: 1) points; 2) percentage; 3) number of points for.
(P) Premiers

== Finals ==
Starting from this season, the league adopted the Page–McIntyre system of finals, in the same year as was done in the VFL. It eliminated the need for a challenge final and the uncertainty about the number of finals matches to be played, involving a fixed four finals matches exclusive of draws. This year, the first semi-final was drawn and this ensured the latest ever finish to a season, which reached as late as mid-October.

=== First semi-final ===
	First semi-final
Saturday, 19 September (2:45 pm)	East Perth 10.19 (79)	drew with	South Fremantle 12.7 (79)	Subiaco Oval (crowd: 8,694)
East Perth waste numerous chances in a dour second half, kicking 3.13 (31) to 3.5 (23)

=== First semi-final replay ===
	First semi-final replay
Saturday, 26 September (2:45 pm)	East Perth 9.18 (72)	def.	South Fremantle 10.10 (70)	Subiaco Oval (crowd: 10,958)
East Perth, in a remarkably similar game to the draw, played excellent football in the second quarter but this time just held off South Fremantle.

=== Second semi-final ===
	Second semi-final
Saturday, 3 October (2:45 pm)	East Fremantle 12.11 (83)	def.	Subiaco 7.13 (55)	Subiaco Oval (crowd: 11,538)
East Fremantle's direct game ensures it stays ahead of a disappointing Subiaco, despite the Maroons having won their previous eight matches and Old Easts having only seventeen men on the field in the second half.

=== Preliminary final ===
	Preliminary final
Saturday, 10 October (2:45 pm)	Subiaco 7.14 (56)	def.	East Perth 7.13 (55)	Subiaco Oval (crowd: 8,115)
East Perth just failed to make up a 23-point deficit with a strong southerly wind.

=== Grand Final ===
1931 WANFL Grand Final
Saturday, 17 October	East Fremantle	def.	Subiaco	Subiaco Oval (crowd: 10,859)
1.4 (10); 5.9 (39); 6.13 (49); 9.13 (67)	Q1; Q2; Q3; Final	3.1 (19); 3.5 (23); 5.7 (37); 7.7 (49)	Umpires: Frank O‘Connor
Kingbury 4, Glass 2, W. James, Taylor, Bee	Goals	Pengel 2, Mackay, F. Brophy, Ballantyne, Diggins, Stewart Daily
W. James, Richards, Jarvis, Munro, Glass, McGlinn, Dolan	Best	Faul, Fitch, Bowe, Lou Daily, Calcutt, Diggins
Butcher (leg cramp)	Injuries	Lou Daily (leg cramp)
Subiaco's weakness in attack on a perfect day for football ensures it cannot threaten Old Easts' hold on the WA(N)FL premiership.
