= Fremantle Team of Legends =

The Fremantle Team of Legends was selected to recognise legends of Australian rules football in Fremantle, Western Australia.

== Selection criteria ==
The main selection criteria for players selected in the team was that they must have played 100 games for either of the Fremantle-based WAFA/WAFL/WANFL clubs. The players must have also been significant figures in Australian rules football and their club(s).

=== Selectors ===
Choosing the team were:

- John O'Connell (Claremont Football Club player) – chairman
- Brian Atkinson – football historian
- Tony Parentich (South Fremantle Football Club player)
- Laurie Nugent (East Fremantle Football Club player)
- Trevor Sprigg (East Fremantle Football Club player)
- George Grljusich – football commentator

== Team ==
The final selected team was announced at the Foundation Day Derby Ball on 2 June 2007. It also involved the commissioning of a jumper to commemorate the team which consisted of the colours of the two Fremantle WAFL teams. The sleeveless jumper is predominantly white with red trimming around the neck and sleeve lines and two blue thin hoops around the stomach region with a Titan holding a shield in the left hand and sword in the right. The word "Fremantle" is above the Titan and "Legends" is below the Titan.

Fremantle Team of Legends
B:	Brad Hardie (South Fremantle)	Con Regan (East Fremantle)	Jack Clarke (East Fremantle)
HB:	Norm Rogers (East Fremantle)	Frank Jenkins (South Fremantle)	Carlisle Jarvis (East Fremantle)
C:	John Todd (South Fremantle)	Ray Sorrell (East Fremantle)	William 'Nipper' Truscott (East Fremantle)
HF:	Len Crabbe (South Fremantle)	John Gerovich (South Fremantle)	Maurice Rioli (South Fremantle)
F:	Jack Sheedy (East Fremantle) – co-captain	Bernie Naylor (South Fremantle)	George Doig (East Fremantle)
Foll:	Stephen Michael (South Fremantle)	Brian Peake (East Fremantle)	Steve Marsh (East Fremantle) – co-captain
Int:	Doug Green (East Fremantle)	Tom Grljusich (South Fremantle)	Graham Melrose (East Fremantle)
Int:	Dave Woods (East Fremantle)		
Coach:	Jerry Dolan (East Fremantle)		

== See also ==
- Greek Team of the Century
- VFL/AFL Italian Team of the Century
- Indigenous Team of the Century

== Notes ==
- East Fremantle has 12 players and South Fremantle 10 players in the team
- The team consisted of 8 Sandover Medallists, 18 WAFL Hall of Fame members and 6 AFL Hall of Fame members.
