= 2024 WAFL Women's season =

West Australian Football League season

- Date: 2 March − 7 July
- Teams: 8
- Premiers: Claremont; 2nd premiership
- Minor premiers: East Fremantle; 2nd minor premiership
- Matches played: 60

The 2024 WAFL Women's season was the sixth season of the WAFL Women's (WAFLW). The season commenced on 2 March and concluded with the Grand Final on 7 July.

For a third successive season, Claremont and East Fremantle contested the Grand Final, with Claremont avenging their 2023 defeat to claim their second premiership.

== Results ==
=== Round 1 ===
	Round 1
Saturday 2 March (4:10 pm)	Claremont 7.5 (49)	def.	Swan Districts 4.7 (31)	Revo Fitness Stadium (crowd: 496)
Saturday 2 March (4:10 pm)	East Perth 3.3 (21)	def. by	Subiaco 18.8 (116)	Sullivan Logistics Stadium (crowd: 559)
Saturday 2 March (4:40 pm)	South Fremantle 3.7 (25)	def. by	East Fremantle 4.4 (28)	Fremantle Oval (crowd: 926)
Saturday 2 March (5:10 pm)	Peel Thunder 3.1 (19)	def. by	West Perth 7.14 (56)	Lane Group Stadium (crowd: 537)

=== Round 2 ===
	Round 2
Saturday 9 March (2:00 pm)	South Fremantle 4.3 (27)	def. by	Claremont 5.12 (42)	Fremantle Oval (crowd: 487)
Sunday 10 March (12:10 pm)	Subiaco 4.1 (25)	def. by	East Fremantle 6.5 (41)	Sullivan Logistics Stadium (crowd: 810)
Sunday 10 March (12:10 pm)	Swan Districts 10.13 (73)	def.	Peel Thunder 1.4 (10)	Steel Blue Oval (crowd: 513)
Sunday 10 March (2:15 pm)	East Perth 1.2 (8)	def. by	West Perth 8.15 (63)	Sullivan Logistics Stadium (crowd: TBC)

=== Round 3 ===
	Round 3
Saturday 16 March (4:40 pm)	Peel Thunder 0.4 (4)	def. by	South Fremantle 10.11 (71)	Lane Group Stadium (crowd: 526)
Sunday 17 March (2:10 pm)	Swan Districts 7.4 (46)	def.	East Perth 3.9 (27)	Steel Blue Oval (crowd: 531)
Sunday 17 March (3:40 pm)	West Perth 4.10 (34)	def.	Subiaco 1.7 (13)	Pentanet Stadium (crowd: 699)
Sunday 17 March (3:50 pm)	Claremont 7.3 (45)	def.	East Fremantle 1.5 (11)	Revo Fitness Stadium (crowd: 454)

=== Round 4 ===
	Round 4
Saturday 23 March (2:10 pm)	East Fremantle 5.2 (32)	def.	Swan Districts 4.7 (31)	Fremantle Oval (crowd: 384)
Saturday 23 March (3:40 pm)	West Perth 9.8 (62)	def.	South Fremantle 2.4 (16)	Pentanet Stadium (crowd: 505)
Saturday 23 March (4:10 pm)	East Perth 3.3 (21)	def. by	Claremont 7.8 (50)	Sullivan Logistics Stadium (crowd: 233)
Sunday 24 March (2:10 pm)	Subiaco 11.13 (79)	def.	Peel Thunder 2.0 (12)	Sullivan Logistics Stadium (crowd: 201)

=== Round 5 ===
Round 5
Bye: Claremont; East Fremantle; East Perth; Peel Thunder; South Fremantle; Subiaco; Swan Districts; West Perth
The league had a break this round due to Easter.

=== Round 6 ===
	Round 6
Friday 5 April(8:05 pm)	West Perth 2.6 (18)	def. by	Claremont 9.4 (58)	Pentanet Stadium (crowd: 949)
Saturday 6 April (3:40 pm)	South Fremantle 7.12 (54)	def.	East Perth 3.1 (19)	Fremantle Oval (crowd: 504)
Sunday 7 April (12:10 pm)	East Fremantle 9.12 (66)	def.	Peel Thunder 0.6 (6)	Fremantle Oval (crowd: 348)
Sunday 7 April (12:10 pm)	Swan Districts 8.4 (52)	def.	Subiaco 4.10 (34)	Steel Blue Oval (crowd: 314)

=== Round 7 ===
	Round 7
Friday 12 April (6:05 pm)	West Perth 1.3 (9)	def. by	East Fremantle 7.3 (45)	Pentanet Stadium (crowd: 655)
Saturday 13 April (11:35 am)	Peel Thunder 3.4 (22)	def. by	East Perth 5.5 (35)	Lane Group Stadium (crowd: TBC)
Saturday 13 April (5:10 pm)	Claremont 5.9 (39)	def.	Claremont 4.5 (29)	Revo Fitness Stadium (crowd: 478)
Sunday 14 April (12:40 pm)	South Fremantle 7.4 (46)	def.	Swan Districts 5.2 (32)	Fremantle Oval (crowd: 586)

=== Round 8 ===
	Round 8
Saturday 20 April (12:10 pm)	East Perth 1.1 (7)	def. by	East Fremantle 9.7 (61)	Sullivan Logistics Stadium (crowd: 589)
Saturday 20 April (12:10 pm)	Swan Districts 1.11 (17)	def. by	West Perth 10.14 (74)	Steel Blue Oval (crowd: 485)
Saturday 20 April (2:15 pm)	Subiaco 4.8 (32)	def. by	South Fremantle 7.6 (48)	Sullivan Logistics Stadium (crowd: 589)
Sunday 21 April (2:10 pm)	Claremont 9.12 (66)	def.	Peel Thunder 0.2 (2)	Revo Fitness Stadium (crowd: 372)

=== Round 9 ===
	Round 9
Saturday 27 April (12:10 pm)	East Perth 3.6 (24)	def.	South Fremantle 2.8 (20)	Sullivan Logistics Stadium (crowd: 420)
Saturday 27 April (12:10 pm)	Swan Districts 7.5 (47)	def.	Claremont 3.4 (22)	Steel Blue Oval (crowd: 440)
Saturday 27 April (2:10 pm)	East Fremantle 6.10 (46)	def.	Subiaco 4.6 (30)	Fremantle Oval (crowd: 435)
Saturday 27 April (7:00 pm)	West Perth 14.7 (91)	def.	Peel Thunder 3.2 (20)	Pentanet Stadium (crowd: 568)

=== Round 10 ===
Round 10
Bye: Claremont; East Fremantle; East Perth; Peel Thunder; South Fremantle; Subiaco; Swan Districts; West Perth
The league had a bye this round.

=== Round 11 ===
	Round 11
Saturday 11 May (11:10 am)	Subiaco 6.8 (44)	def.	Swan Districts 5.3 (33)	Sullivan Logistics Stadium (crowd: 405)
Saturday 11 May (2:10 pm)	Claremont 3.11 (29)	def.	South Fremantle 4.4 (28)	Revo Fitness Stadium (crowd: 214)
Sunday 12 May (12:10 pm)	East Fremantle 6.7 (43)	def.	West Perth 4.2 (26)	Fremantle Oval (crowd: 417)
Sunday 12 May (2:10 pm)	East Perth 3.5 (23)	def. by	Peel Thunder 6.6 (42)	Sullivan Logistics Stadium (crowd: 365)

=== Round 12 ===
	Round 12
Saturday 18 May (2:10 pm)	Claremont 6.4 (40)	def. by	West Perth 6.6 (42)	Revo Fitness Stadium (crowd: 447)
Saturday 18 May (2:10 pm)	Subiaco 10.10 (70)	def.	East Perth 1.4 (10)	Sullivan Logistics Stadium (crowd: 167)
Saturday 18 May (2:10 pm)	Swan Districts 8.8 (56)	def.	South Fremantle 7.3 (45)	Steel Blue Oval (crowd: 437)
Saturday 18 May (2:15 pm)	Peel Thunder 0.0 (0)	def. by	East Fremantle 16.9 (105)	Lane Group Stadium (crowd: 387)

=== Round 13 ===
	Round 13
Saturday 25 May (11:55 am)	Peel Thunder 3.4 (22)	def. by	Subiaco 9.11 (65)	Lane Group Stadium (crowd: TBC)
Saturday 25 May (12:40 pm)	South Fremantle 5.4 (34)	def. by	West Perth 5.6 (36)	Fremantle Oval (crowd: 369)
Saturday 25 May (5:10 pm)	East Fremantle 5.3 (33)	def.	Claremont 1.6 (12)	Revo Fitness Stadium (crowd: 272)
Sunday 26 May (2:10 pm)	East Perth 2.1 (13)	def. by	Swan Districts 17.12 (114)	Sullivan Logistics Stadium (crowd: 597)

=== Round 14 ===
	Round 14
Friday 31 May (7:10 pm)	West Perth 13.12 (90)	def.	East Perth 2.3 (15)	Pentanet Stadium (crowd: 845)
Saturday 1 June (12:40 pm)	South Fremantle 5.9 (39)	def.	Claremont 5.7 (37)	Fremantle Oval (crowd: 470)
Saturday 1 June (2:15 pm)	Peel Thunder 1.5 (11)	def. by	Claremont 3.11 (29)	Lane Group Stadium (crowd: 311)
Sunday 2 June (2:10 pm)	Swan Districts 3.4 (22)	def. by	East Fremantle 4.10 (34)	Steel Blue Oval (crowd: 399)

=== Round 15 ===
	Round 15
Saturday 8 June (12:40 pm)	South Fremantle 5.6 (36)	def.	Peel Thunder 4.1 (25)	Fremantle Oval (crowd: 660)
Saturday 8 June (12:50 pm)	Subiaco 3.3 (21)	def. by	Claremont 3.6 (24)	Sullivan Logistics Stadium (crowd: TBC)
Saturday 8 June (3:10 pm)	East Fremantle 15.11 (101)	def.	East Perth 1.0 (6)	Fremantle Oval (crowd: TBC)
Saturday 8 June (7:05 pm)	West Perth 3.7 (25)	def. by	Swan Districts 7.4 (46)	Pentanet Stadium (crowd: 875)

=== Round 16 ===
	Round 16
Saturday 15 June (11:05 am)	Peel Thunder 1.4 (10)	def. by	Swan Districts 10.9 (69)	Lane Group Stadium (crowd: TBC)
Saturday 15 June (1:00 pm)	East Fremantle 7.10 (52)	def.	South Fremantle 4.4 (28)	Revo Fitness Stadium (crowd: TBC)
Saturday 15 June (5:10 pm)	Claremont 15.14 (104)	def.	East Perth 0.2 (2)	Revo Fitness Stadium (crowd: TBC)
Sunday 16 June (2:10 pm)	Subiaco 6.6 (42)	def.	West Perth 0.9 (9)	Sullivan Logistics Stadium (crowd: 212)

== Ladder ==
Pos	Team	Pld	W	L	D	PF	PA	PP	Pts	Qualification
1	East Fremantle	14	13	1	0	698	272	256.6	52	Finals series
2	Claremont (P)	14	11	3	0	607	323	187.9	44	Finals series
3	West Perth	14	9	5	0	635	416	152.6	36	Finals series
4	Swan Districts	14	8	6	0	669	463	144.5	32	Finals series
5	Subiaco	14	6	8	0	637	430	148.1	24	
6	South Fremantle	14	6	8	0	517	478	108.2	24	
7	East Perth	14	2	12	0	231	953	24.2	8	
8	Peel Thunder	14	1	13	0	205	864	23.7	4	

Source: WAFL
Rules for classification: 1) points; 2) percentage; 3) number of points for.
(P) Premiers

== Finals Series ==
=== Week 1 - Qualifying and Elimination Finals ===
	Elimination Final
Sunday 23 June (11:05 am)	West Perth 11.4 (70)	def.	Swan Districts 4.2 (26)	Pentanet Stadium (crowd: 1,400)

	Qualifying Final
Sunday 23 June (1:10 pm)	East Fremantle 4.7 (31)	def.	Claremont 4.4 (28)	Arena Joondalup (crowd: TBC)

=== Preliminary Finals ===
	Preliminary Finals
Saturday 29 June (3:05 pm)	Claremont 8.7 (55)	def.	West Perth 4.4 (28)	Revo Fitness Stadium (crowd: 904)

=== Grand Final ===
	Grand Final
Sunday 7 July (2:05 pm)	East Fremantle 2.5 (17)	def. by	Claremont 3.2 (20)	Pentanet Stadium (crowd: 3,724)

== Awards ==
- Dhara Kerr Award

Jayme Harken (Claremont)

- WAFLW Joanne Huggins Leading Goal Kicker Award

Courtney Zappara (Swan Districts) - 22 goals

- WAFLW Cath Boyce Rising Star Award

Carys D’Addario (Swan Districts)

- Coach of the Year

Matt Templeton (East Fremantle)

- Rogers Cup Fairest and Best

Hayley Bidefeld (West Perth)

- Rogers Cup Leading Goal Kicker

Shante Anderson (Perth) & Nicole Taylor-Thorpe (South Fremantle) - 29 goals each

- Rogers Cup Premiers

West Perth

== See also ==
- 2024 WAFL season
