= Archie Strang =

Archie Strang may refer to:

- Archie Strang (Australian footballer) (1887–1962), Australian rules footballer
- Archie Strang (rugby union) (1906–1989), New Zealand rugby union player
