= Jasmin Stewart =

Australian rules footballer

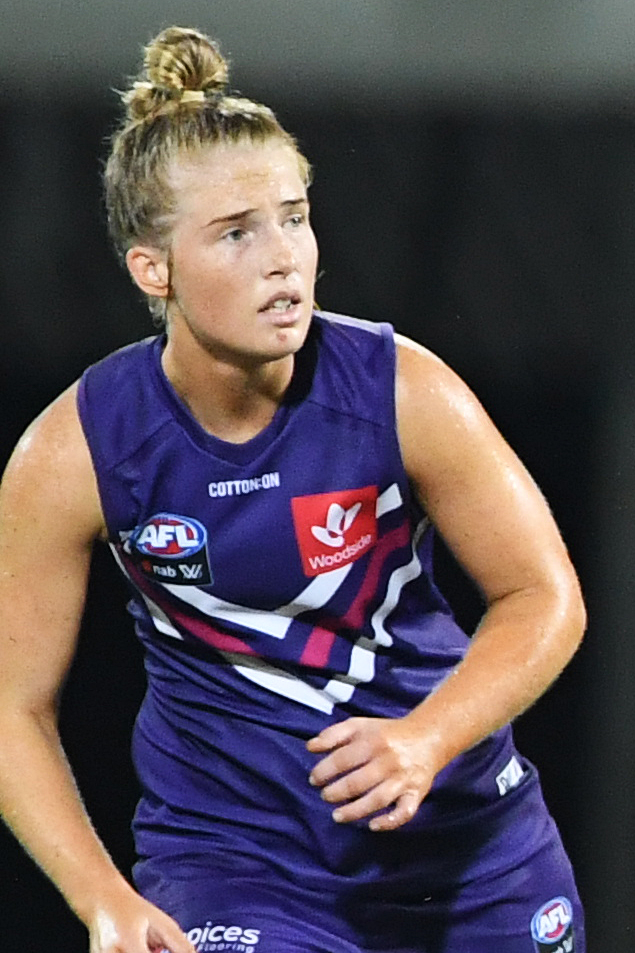
- Stewart playing for Fremantle in January 2019

Personal information
- Born: 4 November 1998 (age 28); Northam, Western Australia
- Original team: Claremont (WAWFL)
- Draft: No. 4, 2018 AFL Women's draft
- Debut: Round 1, 2020, Fremantle vs. Geelong, at Fremantle Oval
- Height: 167 cm (5 ft 6 in)
- Position: Midfielder

Club information
- Current club: Geelong
- Number: 17

Playing career^{1}
Years	Club	Games (Goals)
2019–2022 (S6)	Fremantle	22 (6)
2023–2025	Port Adelaide	20 (2)
2026–	Geelong	0 (0)
Total		42 (8)
- ^{1} Playing statistics correct to the end of the 2025 season.

Jasmin Stewart (born 4 November 1998) is an Australian rules footballer who plays for Geelong in the AFL Women's (AFLW). She has previously played for Fremantle and Port Adelaide.

Stewart is a member of the Djaru people, an Aboriginal Australian group whose Country is located in the southern Kimberley region of Western Australia. She was born in Northam, Western Australia and has also lived in Kambalda and the Pilbara. She attended St Mary's Anglican Girls' School as a boarder.

Fremantle drafted Stewart with their first selection, fourth overall, in the 2018 AFL Women's draft. She did not play an AFLW game during her first season with the Dockers, but made her debut in the first game of the 2020 season. It was announced she re-signed with the Dockers on 5 June 2021.

Stewart retired from senior football in April 2022. She played for Claremont in the 2022 WAFL Women's season, and was awarded the Lou Knitter Medal as best afield in Claremont's grand final victory over East Fremantle.

After missing 2022 season 7, Stewart came out of retirement and was selected by Port Adelaide with pick 2 in the 2023 AFL Women's supplementary draft. She played 20 games for the Power before being delisted at the end of the 2025 season.

Ahead of the 2026 season, Stewart signed with Geelong as a free agent.
