= 2023 WAFL season =

Australian rules football competition

- Teams: 10
- Premiers: East Fremantle; 30th premiership
- Minor premiers: East Fremantle; 34th minor premiership
- Sandover Medallist: Hamish Brayshaw (East Perth – 26 votes)
- Bernie Naylor Medallist: Tyler Keitel (West Perth – 57 goals)

The 2023 WAFL season was the 139th season of the various incarnations of the West Australian Football League (WAFL). The season commenced on 7 April and concluded with the Grand Final on 24 September.

After easily winning the minor premiership, East Fremantle won their 30th WAFL premiership breaking a 25-year drought, defeating Peel Thunder in the Grand Final at Optus Stadium.

== Ladder ==
- For the list of regular season results, see here

Pos	Team	Pld	W	L	D	PF	PA	PP	Pts	Qualification
1	East Fremantle (P)	18	14	4	0	1650	1118	147.6	56	Finals series
2	Subiaco	18	12	6	0	1536	1168	131.5	48	Finals series
3	Peel Thunder	18	12	6	0	1474	1133	130.1	48	Finals series
4	East Perth	18	12	6	0	1656	1275	129.9	48	Finals series
5	Claremont	18	12	6	0	1509	1225	123.2	48	Finals series
6	West Perth	18	11	7	0	1523	1271	119.8	44	
7	Swan Districts	18	8	10	0	1329	1333	99.7	32	
8	South Fremantle (Note: South Fremantle were fined $25,000 and stripped of eight premiership points after breaching the WAFL salary cap during the 2021 WAFL season.)	18	6	12	0	1190	1227	97.0	16	
9	Perth	18	2	15	1	1119	1725	64.9	10	
10	West Coast	18	0	17	1	973	2484	39.2	2	

Source: WAFL.com.au
Rules for classification: 1) points; 2) percentage; 3) number of points for.
(P) Premiers

== Finals series ==
=== Week one – Qualifying and elimination finals ===
	Qualifying final
Saturday, 2 September (2:10 pm)	Subiaco 10.14 (74)	def. by	Peel Thunder 12.12 (84)	Leederville Oval

	Elimination final
Sunday, 3 September (2:10 pm)	East Perth 9.6 (60)	def. by	Claremont 11.6 (72)	Leederville Oval

=== Week two – Semi-finals ===
	Second semi final
Saturday, 9 September (2:10 pm)	East Fremantle 9.6 (60)	def.	Peel Thunder 7.13 (55)	Fremantle Community Bank Oval

	First semi final
Sunday, 10 September (2:10 pm)	Subiaco 16.12 (108)	def.	Claremont 8.1 (49)	Leederville Oval

=== Week three – Preliminary final ===
	Preliminary final
Sunday 17, September (2:10 pm)	Peel Thunder 11.11 (77)	def.	Subiaco 7.11 (53)	Lane Group Stadium

=== Week four – Grand Final ===
2023 WAFL Grand Final
Sunday 24 September (3:00 pm)	East Fremantle	def.	Peel Thunder	Optus Stadium, Perth (crowd: 27,104)	Stats; Report
3.5 (23); 6.6 (42); 9.11 (65); 12.13 (85)	Q1; Q2; Q3; Final	2.0 (12); 4.4 (28); 5.7 (37); 6.10 (46)	Umpires: Gibb, Jago, McPhee, Laycock; Simpson Medal: Milan Murdock (East Fremantle); Television broadcast: Seven Network
Schoenfeld 2, McGuire 2, Murdock, English, Joyce, Marsh, McGuire, Bennett, Montauban, Dixon	Goals	Colyer 2, Middleton, Sears, Smith, Wemm
Murdock, Turner, Eardley, Jupp, Joyce, Marsh, McGuire, Marlin, Bailey.	Best	Wagner, Davies, Blight, Wilson, Hamling, Brodie, Hancock.
Nil	Injuries	Nil
Nil	Reports	Nil

== Notable events ==
- Perth's Kristian Cary kicked for goal after the siren against West Coast in Round 13, but his kick fell short the huge pack competing on the goal line saw the ball forced through for a rushed behind. The draw ended West Coast's losing streak for the season.
- West Coast's Harry Barnett missed a shot on goal in Round 15, allowing Swan Districts to bring the ball back into their forward 50, where Tom Edwards marked and kicked truly.

== See also ==
- 2023 WAFL Women's season
