= Bill Monaghan =

Australian rules footballer and coach

Personal information
- Born: 28 August 1968 (age 58)
- Height: 189 cm (6 ft 2 in)
- Weight: 88 kg (194 lb)
- Position: Full Back

Playing career^{1}
Years	Club	Games (Goals)
1986–1997	Subiaco	158 (43)
1998–2001	Peel Thunder	46 (9)

Coaching career
Years	Club	Games (W–L–D)
2009–18	West Perth	159 (89–68–2)
2019–present	East Fremantle	85 (44–41–0)
- ^{1} Playing statistics correct to the end of 2001.

Career highlights
- 2003: WAFL reserves premiership coach (Subiaco) 2005: WAFL reserves premiership coach (Subiaco) 2013: WAFL league premiership coach (West Perth) 2023: WAFL league premiership coach (East Fremantle)

Bill Monaghan (born 28 August 1968) is the current coach of the East Fremantle Football Club and a former player for the Subiaco Lions and Peel Thunder. He previously coached West Perth from 2009 until 2018.

Monaghan played 204 games for Subiaco and Peel, captained Peel, and represented Western Australia at fullback.

He coached the Lions reserves to premierships in 2003 and 2005, and was an assistant coach under Peter German during the Lions' 2004 and 2006 premierships. When German stepped down in 2006, both German and most senior players favoured Monaghan to take over as senior coach, but the club board instead chose Scott Watters. In 2007 and 2008, Monaghan joined the Fremantle Football Club in a development role. He was appointed senior coach of West Perth for 2009, taking the team to the finals in his first year. Days after leading West Perth to the 2018 WAFL Grand Final, which they lost to Subiaco, Monaghan was sacked as West Perth's coach. He then took the vacant head coaching position at East Fremantle, where he led the Sharks to victory in the 2023 WAFL Grand Final, breaking a 25-year premiership drought.
