= 2022 WAFL Women's season =

- Teams: 7
- Premiers: Claremont; 1st premiership
- Minor premiers: East Fremantle; 1st minor premiership

The 2022 WAFL Women's season was the fourth season of the WAFL Women's (WAFLW). The season commenced on 19 February and concluded with the Grand Final on 2 July 2022. West Perth made their debut in the competition, increasing the league's size to seven clubs. Claremont won the premiership, and defeated East Fremantle by 8 points in the grand final.

== Clubs ==
- Claremont, East Fremantle, Peel Thunder, South Fremantle, Subiaco, Swan Districts, West Perth

== Ladder ==
Pos	Team	Pld	W	L	D	PF	PA	PP	Pts	Qualification
1	East Fremantle	14	14	0	0	788	226	348.7	56	Finals series
2	Claremont (P)	14	11	3	0	722	247	292.3	44	Finals series
3	Peel Thunder	14	8	6	0	632	475	133.1	32	Finals series
4	Swan Districts	14	6	8	0	521	530	98.3	24	Finals series
5	Subiaco	14	6	8	0	409	462	88.5	24	
6	South Fremantle	14	4	10	0	429	613	70.0	16	
7	West Perth	14	0	14	0	105	1053	10.0	0	

Updated to match(es) played on 11 June 2022. Source: WAFL.com.au
Rules for classification: 1) points; 2) percentage; 3) number of points for.
(P) Premiers

== Finals series ==
=== Semi-finals ===
	First Semi-Final
June 19 (1:30 pm)	Peel Thunder 4.5 (29)	def. by	Swan Districts 5.4 (34)	Lane Group Stadium	Report

	Second Semi-Final
June 19 (2:00 pm)	East Fremantle 2.2 (14)	def.	Claremont 1.3 (9)	New Choice Homes Park	Report

=== Preliminary final ===
	Preliminary Final
June 26 (2:00 pm)	Claremont 6.9 (45)	def.	Swan Districts 4.3 (27)	Revo Fitness Park	Report

=== Grand Final ===
2022 WAFLW Grand Final
July 2 2022 (2:45 pm)	East Fremantle	def. by	Claremont	Revo Fitness Park
2.0 (12); 4.0 (24); 5.1 (31); 6.2 (38)	Q1; Q2; Q3; Final	2.0 (12); 4.1 (25); 6.2 (38); 7.4 (46)	Lou Knitter Medal (Best on ground): Jasmin Stewart (Claremont); Television broadcast: Seven Network
Catherine 3 Raison 2 Leitch 1	Goals	Ortlepp 3 Garstone, Thorogood, Western, Whyte 1

== Awards ==
- Dhara Kerr Award

Sharon Wong (East Fremantle)

- WAFLW Joanne Huggins Leading Goal Kicker Award

Kate Bartlett (Peel Thunder)

- WAFLW Cath Boyce Rookie of the Year Award

Julia Teakle (East Fremantle)

- Coach of the Year

Matthew Templeton (East Fremantle)

- Rogers Cup Fairest and Best

Mia Russo (West Perth)

- Rogers Cup Leading Goal Kicker

Carys D'Addario (Swan Districts)

- Rogers Cup Rising Star

Mia Russo (West Perth)

- Reserves Premiers

Claremont Football Club

- Reserves Fairest and Best

Amber Ugle-Hayward (Swan Districts)

- Reserves Leading Goal Kicker

Jessie McDonald (East Fremantle)
