= Merv Cowan =

Australian rules footballer

Personal information
- Full name: Mervyn George Cowan
- Nickname: Podge
- Born: 5 April 1925; Fremantle, Australia
- Died: 22 May 2016 (aged 91)
- Position: Back pocket

Playing career
Years	Club	Games (Goals)
1942–1943	South Fremantle	24 (0)
1948–1957	East Fremantle	169 (23)

Coaching career
Years	Club	Games (W–L–D)
1958	East Fremantle (Reserves)	

Mervyn George "Merv" Cowan (5 April 1925 – 22 May 2016) was an Australian rules footballer who served as an administrator of the sport for five decades after his retirement from playing. After a 193-game playing career that included one Western Australian National Football League (WANFL) premiership, Cowan moved into administration of the sport and was active within Western Australian football until beyond his 70th birthday. His contribution to the sport was recognised with his induction into the West Australian Football Hall of Fame in 2007.

== Playing career ==
Cowan started his football career as a 17-year-old with South Fremantle in 1942. He played 24 games for the Bulldogs between 1942 and 1943, during which time the league operated as an under-ages competition due to most senior players being involved in Australia's effort in World War II. Cowan himself enlisted with the Royal Australian Navy in July 1943 at the age of eighteen and served a period of almost three years.

After his return from the war, Cowan wanted to resume his career with South Fremantle; however, he was required to play with their arch rival East Fremantle as he had lived within their recruiting zone. Cowan spent ten years with Old Easts, including two seasons as captain in 1953 and 1954. He ended his playing career in 1957 as a member of East Fremantle's first premiership side since 1946. Cowan played in 21 of the team's 24 games in the 1957 season and started in the back pocket position for the 16-point grand final against East Perth. Cowan played a total of 169 games for East Fremantle and received 11 Sandover Medal votes during his career.

== Coaching career ==
Following his retirement as a player Cowan spent one year as coach of the Old Easts' reserves side. He subsequently was nominated to become a life member of the club. In later years ten of his teammates from the 1957 grand final team were also bestowed with the honour.

== Recognition and legacy ==
Cowan was inducted into the West Australian Football Hall of Fame in March 2007 for his role as an administrator of the sport in Western Australia. In 2012 East Fremantle established its own Hall of Fame, naming Cowan as one of nine inaugural inductees to be conferred "Legend" status.

Cowan's contribution to sport in Fremantle and Western Australia has been recognised in many ways, including an entrance gate at Subiaco Oval, a grandstand at East Fremantle Oval and a park in the town of East Fremantle all being named after him.
