= Johnny Leonard =

Australian rules footballer and coach

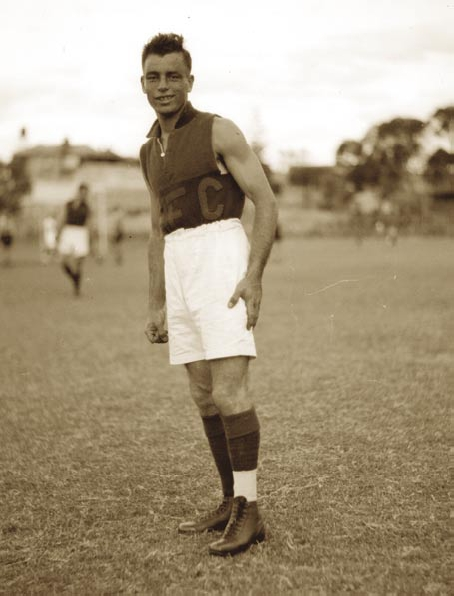
- Johnny Leonard training, c. 1926

Personal information
- Full name: John James Leonard
- Nickname: Johnny
- Born: 8 June 1903; Newcastle, England
- Died: 10 May 1995 (aged 91); Cottesloe, Western Australia
- Height: 173 cm (5 ft 8 in)
- Weight: 68 kg (150 lb)
- Position: Rover

Playing career^{1}
Years	Club	Games (Goals)
1922–30	Subiaco	141 (??)
1932	South Melbourne	12 (17)

Coaching career^{3}
Years	Club	Games (W–L–D)
1931	Maryborough	?? (??)
1932	South Melbourne	19 (13–6–0)
1934–35, 1937	West Perth	66 (43–22–1)
1938–41, 1946	Claremont	109 (65–43–1)
- ^{1} Playing statistics correct to the end of 1932.^{3} Coaching statistics correct as of 1946.

Career highlights
- Subiaco premiership 1924; Sandover Medal 1926, 1929; Subiaco best & fairest 1926, 1927, 1928, 1929, 1930; Subiaco captain 1930; South Melbourne captain-coach 1932; West Perth premiership coach 1934, 1935; Claremont premiership coach 1938, 1939, 1940; Australian Football Hall of Fame inductee 1996; West Australian Football Hall of Fame inductee 2004; Subiaco Team of the Century

John James Leonard (8 June 1903 – 10 May 1995) was a player and coach of Australian rules football in the West Australian Football League (WAFL) and the Victorian Football League (later renamed to Australian Football League) in the period 1922 to 1946.

He was born in England.

== Playing career ==
A slightly built (173 cm, 68 kg) and very quick rover with brilliant skills, Leonard played in Subiaco Football Club's 1924 premiership side. He was Subiaco's best and fairest player five times. He played 158 senior club games and represented his State 25 times.

He won the Sandover Medal in 1926 (the first English-born player to do so) and was awarded a retrospective medal for the 1929 season after finishing second on a countback. Prior to 1930 only one vote per game was given by the umpire, and a countback was not possible; the WAFL president would cast a deciding vote to decide the winner. Both Leonard and William (Billy) Thomas of East Perth Football Club polled the umpire's vote in five matches.

With the Great Depression limiting employment options, Leonard moved to Victoria in 1931, coaching Maryborough in the Ballarat Football League, then in 1932 being appointed as Captain-Coach of South Melbourne.

Playing career highlights:

- 158 games (146 Subiaco, 12 South Melbourne);
- Subiaco captain 1930;
- Subiaco fairest and best 1926 to 1930;
- Subiaco premiership player 1924;
- Sandover medal 1926 and 1929 (retrospective);
- 25 state games for Western Australia.

== Coaching career ==
Leonard coached over only nine seasons but with a great deal of success, securing five WANFL premierships. He coached South Melbourne for the 1932 season, taking it to its first finals campaign in almost a decade. He is credited with laying the groundwork for the "foreign legion" team which won the 1933 VFL premiership, recruiting leading WANFL players such as his Subiaco teammates Brighton Diggins and Bill Faul.

Returning to Perth in 1933 for employment, he embarked on a further successful coaching period. He steered West Perth Football Club to successive premierships in 1934 and 1935. Leonard was asked to return to South Melbourne at the end of 1936, but business prevented him moving to Victoria. Staying in Perth, Leonard coached West Perth for another season, and then moved to coach a highly talented Claremont team to three consecutive premierships. After World War II, Leonard was again appointed as Claremont coach for the 1946 season after no one else could be found, but business commitments meant he had to leave most of the work to deputy Jack Reeves and the Tigers won only three matches. Seven years later, Leonard was asked at the age of fifty to re-take the coaching reins at South Melbourne, but his business in a football-making factory took up all of his time and he could not accept.

Leonard was inducted to the Australian Football Hall of Fame as a coach in 1996 – one year after his death.

== Other interests ==
Leonard was a highly respected Perth businessman following his football career. In April 1946, he played a key role in orchestrating the first meeting that led to the formation of the Western Australian Basketball Association. He served as the Association President for the first two years and the local associations played for the John Leonard Perpetual Shield in the winter competition.
