= 1929 WAFL season =

Australian rules football season

- Teams: 7
- Premiers: East Fremantle; 14th premiership
- Minor premiers: East Fremantle; 16th minor premiership
- Sandover Medallist: Billy Thomas (East Perth); Johnny Leonard (Subiaco) (Note: Awarded retrospectively in 1997 after losing on casting vote.)
- Bernie Naylor Medallist: Sol Lawn (South Fremantle)
- Matches played: 66

The 1929 WAFL season was the 45th season of the West Australian Football League in its various incarnations.

East Fremantle proved the outstanding team, and won the second of what would become seven successive minor premierships and four successive flags. With a convincing last round win, Subiaco denied a Perth club bolstered by the return as coach of Jack Leckie – who had masterminded their pre-war successes including their only premiership to that point – a first finals appearance since 1920. Claremont-Cottesloe won more games than in its first three seasons combined and a brilliant mid-season burst looked to assure it of a finals berth before a September fade-out. However, the Great Depression and the financial power of several wealthy VFL clubs prevented the Tigers sustaining this improvement.

Following the death in a truck accident of champion coach Phil Matson, an upheaval off the field during the summer, and the retirement of numerous top players of their 1920s dynasty such as Bonny Campbell, Val Sparrow (who took to coaching the club), "Paddy" Hebbard, Joe O'Meara and Jack Walsh, former powerhouse East Perth suffered its first wooden spoon since 1913 and lost a club record fifteen consecutive matches. The Royals were also affected by injuries to remaining key players Owens and Fletcher, who missed several games and were never fully fit.

Sol Lawn of South Fremantle beat the record of Bonny Campbell for most goals in a WAFL season, finishing with ninety-six.

== Home-and-away season ==
=== Round 1 ===
	Round 1
Saturday, 20 April (2:45 pm)	East Perth 5.5 (35)	def. by	West Perth 15.10 (100)	Perth Oval
Saturday, 20 April (2:45 pm)	Perth 10.12 (72)	def. by	South Fremantle 11.10 (76)	WACA
Saturday, 20 April (2:45 pm)	East Fremantle 9.14 (68)	def. by	Claremont-Cottesloe 9.15 (69)	Fremantle Oval
	Bye; Subiaco
South Fremantle come back from 31 points down to beat Perth, whilst Claremont-Cottesloe record a first-ever win over an "experimental" East Fremantle lineup

=== Round 2 ===
	Round 2
Saturday, 27 April (2:45 pm)	Perth 11.12 (78)	def.	West Perth 6.9 (45)	WACA
Saturday, 27 April (2:45 pm)	Subiaco 12.10 (82)	def. by	East Fremantle 13.11 (89)	Subiaco Oval
Saturday, 27 April (2:45 pm)	Claremont-Cottesloe 12.13 (85)	def. by	East Perth 13.13 (91)	Claremont Oval
	Bye; South Fremantle
No teams had two wins after two rounds, as a succession of close finishes and the defeat of all the opening round victors suggested at this early stage that the seven clubs were very evenly matched.

=== Round 3 ===
	Round 3
Saturday, 11 May (2:45 pm)	East Fremantle 11.14 (80)	def.	Perth 9.12 (66)	Fremantle Oval
Saturday, 11 May (2:45 pm)	Claremont-Cottesloe 12.4 (76)	def. by	South Fremantle 15.18 (108)	Claremont Oval
Saturday, 11 May (2:45 pm)	East Perth 5.4 (34)	def. by	Subiaco 7.18 (60)	Perth Oval
	Bye; West Perth

=== Round 4 ===
	Round 4
Saturday, 18 May (2:45 pm)	South Fremantle 14.18 (102)	def.	East Perth 9.15 (69)	Fremantle Oval
Saturday, 18 May (2:45 pm)	Subiaco 17.7 (109)	def.	Claremont-Cottesloe 13.10 (88)	Subiaco Oval
Saturday, 18 May (2:45 pm)	West Perth 15.14 (104)	def. by	East Fremantle 18.17 (125)	Leederville Oval
	Bye; Perth
West Perth score a century against Old Easts for the first time, ending the longest sequence of scores under 100 by one club against another.

=== Round 5 ===
	Round 5
Saturday, 25 May (2:45 pm)	Perth 12.16 (88)	def.	East Perth 10.4 (64)	WACA
Saturday, 25 May (2:45 pm)	South Fremantle 13.15 (93)	def.	Subiaco 11.9 (75)	Fremantle Oval
Saturday, 25 May (2:45 pm)	Claremont-Cottesloe 9.8 (62)	def. by	West Perth 10.14 (74)	Claremont Oval
	Bye; East Fremantle
South Fremantle, with Sol Lawn maintaining an average of six goals a game despite Perth's wettest May since 1879 win their fifth on end in a match memorable for former umpire Percy Trotter, who was a spectator, officiating in the last quarter after field umpire Frank O‘Connor had to leave the field because of a twisted knee and was replaced by boundary umpire Oakley.

=== Round 6 ===
	Round 6
Saturday, 1 June (2:45 pm)	Perth 8.8 (56)	def.	Claremont-Cottesloe 7.10 (52)	WACA
Saturday, 1 June (2:45 pm)	West Perth 16.11 (107)	def.	Subiaco 11.8 (74)	Leederville Oval
Saturday, 1 June (2:45 pm)	South Fremantle 7.11 (53)	def. by	East Fremantle 8.18 (66)	Fremantle Oval
	Bye; East Perth

=== Round 7 (Foundation Day) ===
	Round 7
Monday, 3 June (2:45 pm)	East Perth 5.11 (41)	def. by	East Fremantle 11.15 (81)	Perth Oval
Monday, 3 June (2:45 pm)	Subiaco 10.8 (68)	def. by	Perth 14.21 (105)	Subiaco Oval
Monday, 3 June (2:45 pm)	South Fremantle 9.9 (63)	def.	West Perth 7.19 (61)	Fremantle Oval
	Bye; Claremont-Cottesloe

=== Round 8 ===
	Round 8
Saturday, 8 June (2:45 pm)	South Fremantle 9.15 (69)	def.	Perth 8.10 (58)	Fremantle Oval
Saturday, 8 June (2:45 pm)	Subiaco 13.11 (89)	def.	West Perth 10.6 (66)	Subiaco Oval
Saturday, 8 June (2:45 pm)	Claremont-Cottesloe 10.18 (78)	def.	East Fremantle 10.11 (71)	Claremont Oval
	Bye; East Perth

=== Round 9 ===
	Round 9
Saturday, 15 June (2:45 pm)	East Perth 12.16 (88)	def. by	Claremont-Cottesloe 13.14 (92)	Perth Oval
Saturday, 15 June (2:45 pm)	West Perth 12.14 (86)	def.	Perth 11.9 (75)	Leederville Oval
Saturday, 15 June (2:45 pm)	East Fremantle 13.11 (89)	def.	Subiaco 12.11 (83)	Fremantle Oval
	Bye; South Fremantle
Claremont-Cottesloe led East Perth 7.8 (50) to 0.2 (2) at quarter-time before holding on to win by only four points; umpire Trotter was mobbed after the game

=== Round 10 ===
	Round 10
Saturday, 22 June (2:45 pm)	West Perth 15.10 (100)	def.	East Perth 13.11 (89)	Leederville Oval
Saturday, 22 June (2:45 pm)	Claremont-Cottesloe 19.9 (123)	def.	Perth 12.13 (85)	Claremont Oval
Saturday, 22 June (2:45 pm)	East Fremantle 13.17 (95)	def.	South Fremantle 11.19 (85)	Fremantle Oval
	Bye; Subiaco
Claremont-Cottesloe entered the top four for the first time in their history with a skilful display of precise ball movement that leaves them the sole unbeaten team since the clubs had met each other once.

=== Round 11 ===
	Round 11
Saturday, 29 June (2:45 pm)	East Perth 9.16 (70)	def. by	South Fremantle 13.14 (92)	Perth Oval
Saturday, 29 June (2:45 pm)	Claremont-Cottesloe 12.6 (78)	def.	Subiaco 11.11 (77)	Claremont Oval
Saturday, 29 June (2:45 pm)	East Fremantle 9.7 (61)	def. by	West Perth 9.12 (66)	Fremantle Oval
	Bye; Perth

=== Round 12 ===
	Round 12
Saturday, 13 July (2:45 pm)	East Perth 11.7 (73)	def. by	Perth 21.14 (140)	Perth Oval
Saturday, 13 July (2:45 pm)	Subiaco 19.10 (124)	def.	South Fremantle 13.12 (90)	Subiaco Oval
Saturday, 13 July (2:45 pm)	West Perth 17.13 (115)	def.	Claremont-Cottesloe 15.7 (97)	Leederville Oval
	Bye; East Fremantle
Alan Evans kicked ten goals for Perth, and Frank Hopkins kicked eight goals for West Perth.; East Perth lost its eighth consecutive match, breaking its club-record from 1911 record of seven consecutive losses. The streak ultimately finished at 15 matches, which remains the club record as of 2014.

=== Round 13 ===
	Round 13
Saturday, 20 July (2:45 pm)	Perth 9.9 (63)	def. by	East Fremantle 10.13 (73)	WACA
Saturday, 20 July (2:45 pm)	South Fremantle 7.12 (54)	def. by	Claremont-Cottesloe 12.6 (78)	Fremantle Oval
Saturday, 20 July (2:45 pm)	Subiaco 14.15 (99)	def.	East Perth 8.13 (61)	Subiaco Oval
	Bye; West Perth

=== Round 14 ===
	Round 14
Saturday, 27 July (2:45 pm)	West Perth 12.12 (84)	def.	South Fremantle 12.11 (83)	Leederville Oval
Saturday, 27 July (2:45 pm)	Perth 6.12 (48)	def. by	Subiaco 8.15 (63)	WACA
Saturday, 27 July (2:45 pm)	East Fremantle 25.16 (166)	def.	East Perth 7.12 (54)	Fremantle Oval
	Bye; Claremont-Cottesloe
East Perth suffered its heaviest loss until 1984, and East Fremantle kicked the highest WAFL score since 1917.; Castles of South Fremantle missed with the last kick of the match, allowing West Perth to achieve a narrow win after being behind almost all day.

=== Round 15 ===
	Round 15
Saturday, 3 August (2:45 pm)	East Perth 10.13 (73)	def. by	South Fremantle 16.14 (110)	Perth Oval
Saturday, 3 August (2:45 pm)	Claremont-Cottesloe 9.16 (70)	def.	Subiaco 10.7 (67)	Claremont Oval
Saturday, 3 August (2:45 pm)	West Perth 11.13 (79)	def. by	East Fremantle 12.12 (84)	Leederville Oval
	Bye; Perth

=== Round 16 ===
	Round 16
Saturday, 4 May (2:45 pm)	South Fremantle 17.12 (114)	def.	Perth 8.10 (58)	Fremantle Oval
Saturday, 17 August (2:45 pm)	Subiaco 10.7 (67)	def. by	West Perth 17.12 (114)	Subiaco Oval
Saturday, 17 August (2:45 pm)	East Fremantle 15.22 (112)	def.	Claremont-Cottesloe 7.12 (54)	Fremantle Oval
	Bye; East Perth
The South Fremantle versus Perth game is brought forward fourteen weeks to allow Perth to tour the eastern states during a break for interstate football, and played as the only match on the days of the King's Cup horse race. Sol Lawn kicked eight goals.; The match between Subiaco and West Perth was affected by a hailstorm at three-quarter time, which saw players and spectators seek shelter for several minutes away from the grandstand, though there was no actual interruption.

=== Round 17 ===
	Round 17
Saturday, 24 August (2:45 pm)	East Fremantle 14.16 (100)	def.	Subiaco 12.14 (86)	Fremantle Oval
Saturday, 24 August (2:45 pm)	East Perth 12.16 (88)	def. by	Claremont-Cottesloe 21.14 (140)	Perth Oval
Saturday, 24 August (2:45 pm)	Perth 10.15 (75)	def. by	West Perth 14.14 (98)	WACA
	Bye; South Fremantle
Claremont-Cottesloe kick their highest score in the WA(N)FL until 1937 and their first ever twenty-goal score, leaving West Perth as the only existing club not to have scored twenty goals in a game. (Note: The other competing clubs' first 20-goal scores were: Perth – 25.24 (174) v Subiaco in 1904; East Fremantle – 21.11 (137) v Midland Junction in 1905; Subiaco – 20.15 (135) v West Perth in 1913; South Fremantle – 22.15 (147) v Midland Junction in 1916; East Perth – 21.8 (134) v West Perth in 1926. North Fremantle kicked its only 20-goal score of 25.24 (174) against Subiaco as early as 1902, whilst West Perth was to score its first in 1933.) The result leaves the Tigers three wins clear inside the top four.

=== Round 18 ===
	Round 18
Saturday, 31 August (2:45 pm)	Claremont-Cottesloe 10.11 (71)	def. by	Perth 14.6 (90)	Claremont Oval
Saturday, 31 August (2:45 pm)	West Perth 16.17 (113)	def.	East Perth 10.15 (75)	Leederville Oval
Saturday, 31 August (2:45 pm)	East Fremantle 16.19 (115)	def.	South Fremantle 12.9 (81)	Fremantle Oval
	Bye; Subiaco

=== Round 19 ===
	Round 19
Saturday, 7 September (2:45 pm)	West Perth 14.18 (102)	def.	Claremont-Cottesloe 10.13 (73)	Leederville Oval
Saturday, 7 September (2:45 pm)	Perth 11.15 (81)	def.	East Perth 8.7 (55)	WACA (crowd: 200)
Saturday, 7 September (2:45 pm)	South Fremantle 11.9 (75)	def. by	Subiaco 14.10 (94)	Fremantle Oval
	Bye; East Fremantle
Subiaco's second-half recovery to beat South Fremantle leaves the red and whites' battle with Claremont-Cottesloe a must-win for the latter team to remain with a final chance owing to their last-round bye and poor percentage.

=== Round 20 ===
	Round 20
Saturday, 14 September (2:45 pm)	Claremont-Cottesloe 8.15 (63)	def. by	South Fremantle 11.16 (82)	Claremont Oval
Saturday, 14 September (2:45 pm)	Subiaco 12.19 (91)	def.	East Perth 10.5 (65)	Subiaco Oval
Saturday, 14 September (2:45 pm)	Perth 11.16 (82)	def.	East Fremantle 8.5 (53)	WACA
	Bye; West Perth
Claremont-Cottesloe dropped out of the running for the finals, but Perth kept its chances of playing major round football alive by easily beating East Fremantle, who were resting players for the finals.

=== Round 21 ===
	Round 21
Saturday, 21 September (2:45 pm)	South Fremantle 17.15 (117)	def.	West Perth 13.12 (90)	Fremantle Oval
Saturday, 21 September (2:45 pm)	East Perth 12.15 (87)	def.	East Fremantle 12.10 (82)	Perth Oval
Saturday, 21 September (2:45 pm)	Subiaco 17.11 (113)	def.	Perth 10.15 (75)	Subiaco Oval
	Bye; Claremont-Cottesloe
Sol Lawn kicked thirteen goals to finish with ninety for the home-and-away season, in the process beating Bonny Campbell's 1926 record of 82 for the home-and-away season and 89 for a full season with finals to come.; East Perth ended its fifteen-match losing streak with a thrilling comeback win over minor premiers East Fremantle.; Subiaco played Perth in a match which directly determined which club finished fourth. Subiaco won convincingly, and with Faul dominating they kicked 11.6 (72) to 1.5 (11) after half-time.

== Ladder ==
1929 ladder
Pos	Team	Pld	W	L	D	PF	PA	PP	Pts
1	East Fremantle (P)	18	13	5	0	1610	1313	122.6	52
2	West Perth	18	12	6	0	1604	1422	112.8	48
3	South Fremantle	18	11	7	0	1547	1421	108.9	44
4	Subiaco	18	9	9	0	1521	1447	105.1	36
5	Perth	18	8	10	0	1395	1376	101.4	32
6	Claremont-Cottesloe	18	8	10	0	1449	1537	94.3	32
7	East Perth	18	2	16	0	1212	1822	66.5	8

Source: WAFL Footy Facts
Rules for classification: 1) points; 2) percentage; 3) number of points for.
(P) Premiers

== Finals ==
=== First semi-final ===
	First semi-final
Saturday, 28 September (2:45 pm)	West Perth 8.17 (65)	def. by	South Fremantle 9.13 (67)	Fremantle Oval (crowd: 10,911)
The crowd established a record for a club match at Fremantle Oval

=== Second semi-final ===
	Second semi-final
Saturday, 5 October (2:45 pm)	East Fremantle 10.15 (75)	def.	Subiaco 5.12 (42)	Subiaco Oval (crowd: 5,827)

=== Grand Final ===
1929 WAFL Grand Final
Saturday, 12 October	East Fremantle	def.	South Fremantle	Subiaco Oval (crowd: 10,729)
5.7 (37); 5.12 (42); 6.19 (55); 8.22 (70)	Q1; Q2; Q3; Final	0.2 (2); 0.5 (5); 0.6 (6); 5.9 (39)	Umpires: P Trotter
Rowlands 3, Lethridge 2, Bee, Dolan, Jones	Goals	Ron Doig 3, White, Farrell
Telfer, Laffin, Richards, Buchanan, Jarvis, Woods, Reynolds, Letheridge.	Best	Farrell, McGuinness, Jennings, Pearse, Shanahan, Campbell
On a windy day, East Fremantle set up its win by holding South Fremantle goalless in the second quarter when the latter had the aid of the wind. Sol Lawn, who entered the match with 96 goals for the season, was held scoreless by Woods.
