= Ron Cooper (Australian footballer) =

Australian rules footballer

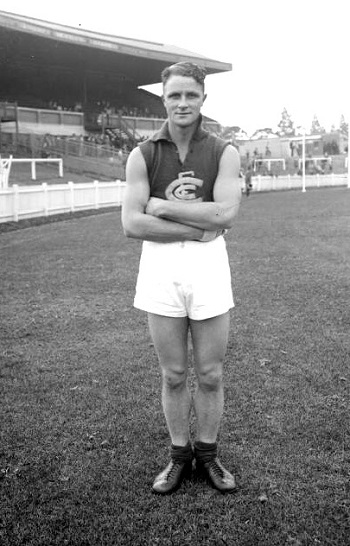
- Copper during his Carlton career

Personal information
- Full name: Ron Cooper
- Born: 8 June 1911
- Died: 18 October 1991 (aged 80)
- Original team: Claremont-Cottesloe
- Height: 179 cm (5 ft 10 in)
- Weight: 80 kg (176 lb)
- Position: Centreman/Rover

Playing career^{1}
Years	Club	Games (Goals)
1932–42	Carlton	157 (170)
1943	North Melbourne	2 (1)
Total		159 (171)
- ^{1} Playing statistics correct to the end of 1943.

Ronald Thomas 'Socks' Cooper (8 June 1911 – 18 October 1991) was an Australian rules footballer who played for Carlton and North Melbourne in the VFL. His habit of wearing his socks knee high earned him his nickname.

Cooper, originally from the Albany district, started his career in the West Australian Football League. Playing mostly as a rover or centreman, he spent three seasons with Claremont-Cottesloe and won their 1931 'Best and fairest' award as well as finishing second in the Sandover Medal count to Lin Richards. After 49 games, he sought and received a clearance to Carlton and had a good debut season.

He broke into the strong Carlton side in round five and was part of nine successive wins as the club made it all the way to the Grand Final. Cooper played in a forward pocket in the Grand Final loss to Richmond and despite appearing in further finals in subsequent years he never made another decider. The closest he came was when Carlton won the premiership in 1938 but he missed the Grand Final through suspension, having been charged with striking St Kilda's Doug Rayment in the final home and away fixture. Despite missing the finals series it was his most prolific season in front of goals, with 30 majors.

In 1936 he returned to Western Australia and was appointed playing coach of South Fremantle, but returned to the Eastern States before the season started.

'Socks' Cooper crossed to North Melbourne in 1943 but only played the one season. He spent the rest of the decade at VFA club Prahran.
