= Archie Strang (Australian footballer) =

Australian rules footballer

Personal information
- Full name: Archibald William Strang
- Nickname: Archie
- Born: 28 June 1887; Beaconsfield, Western Australia
- Died: 18 September 1962 (aged 75); Fremantle, Western Australia

Playing career
Years	Club	Games (Goals)
1906–1923	East Fremantle	241 (50)
1911	Western Australia	4 (0)

Career highlights
- 6x WAFL Premiership player 1908, 1909, 1910, 1911, 1914, 1918.; East Fremantle life member; East Fremantle Hall of Fame member

Archibald William Strang (28 June 1887 – 18 September 1962) was an Australian football player in the Western Australian Football League (WAFL).

== Early life ==
Strang was born to Margaret Jane (Jane) (née Goodall) and Matthew Archibald Strang from Lanarkshire, Scotland, in Beaconsfield, Western Australia.

Strang began his junior football career playing with Midland Locos Football Club and East Fremantle Juniors.

== Football career ==
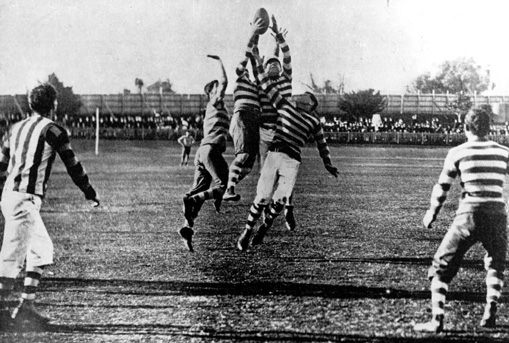
Football match Fremantle Oval 1910

In 1906, at 18 years of age he made his seniors debut with East Fremantle Football Club.

Strang was described as being rugged and big-hearted, with great football brains and whilst beginning his career on the wing being able to play any position.

Strang represented East Fremantle for 18 seasons, playing 241 games and kicking 50 goals from 1906 till 1923. He played in a record 13 grand finals for six premierships in 1908, 1909, 1910, 1911, 1914, and 1918. This remains the most grand final appearances by any WAFL player.

He represented Western Australia in four games. This was limited as Western Australia did not play interstate games during the First World War or in the years following.

After retiring he became a trainer at East Fremantle.

Strang is life member of the East Fremantle Football Club and was inducted into the inaugural East Fremantle Football Club Hall of Fame.

== Personal life ==
Strang married Amy Beresford in Fremantle on 8 December 1915. The couple had three children, Archibald (Charlie), Amy and Phyllis.

Their son Archibald Charles Strang would also become an Australian football player and coach in the Western Australian Football League.

Strang died in Fremantle 18 September 1962.
