= Graham Melrose =

Australian rules footballer (born 1949)

Personal information
- Full name: Graham Thomas Melrose
- Born: 20 April 1949 (age 77)

Playing career^{1}
Years	Club	Games (Goals)
1967–1974	East Fremantle	140 (216)
1975–1979	North Melbourne	111 (138)
1980–1982	Swan Districts	71 (86) (Note: These tallies refer to premiership matches (home-and-away and finals matches) only.)
Total		322 (440)

Representative team honours
Years	Team	Games (Goals)
1966–1979	Western Australia	9 (9)

Coaching career
Years	Club	Games (W–L–D)
1987–1989	East Fremantle	69 (44–25–0)
1995–1996	Swan Districts (WAFL)	42 (11–31–0)
- ^{1} Playing statistics correct to the end of 1982.

Career highlights
- 2× WAFL Premiership player: (1974, 1982); Sandover Medal: (1974); Simpson Medal: (1982); 2× Lynn Medal: (1971, 1974); Swan Districts Team of the Century 1934–2000; Western Australian Football Hall of Fame, inducted 2007; East Fremantle Football Club Hall of Fame, inducted 2012

Graham Thomas Melrose (born 20 April 1949) is a former Australian rules footballer who played for the North Melbourne Football Club in the Victorian Football League (VFL) as well as for the East Fremantle Football Club and the Swan Districts Football Club in the Western Australian Football League (WAFL).

Regarded as a competitive and skilful rover with particularly accurate foot passing, Melrose was unlucky to miss out on North Melbourne's premierships due to injury, but experienced success with both East Fremantle and Swan Districts. He later had brief coaching stints at the Sharks and Swans. Melrose is one of few footballers to be named in the Team of the Century at two different clubs.

== Playing career ==
Melrose began his career at East Fremantle in the WANFL competition in 1967. The team was experiencing little success at the time but with players such as Melrose, Brian Peake, Tony Buhagiar joining through the late 1960s and early 1970s and under the stewardship of coach John Todd, East Fremantle won the 1974 premiership. Melrose was awarded the Lynn Medal (Fairest and Best award at East Fremantle) twice while at the club and also won the Sandover Medal in 1974.

Melrose moved East in 1975 to join Victorian Football League club North Melbourne where he settled into the regular lineup in the forward pocket and sharing roving duties with Barry Cable.

North Melbourne won the 1975 VFL Grand Final but Melrose was unable to play because of a hand injury. In 1976 Melrose had a great season and performed consistently well, including a great game in the 1976 VFL Grand Final which saw Hawthorn beat North Melbourne.

The 1977 VFL season was another outstanding time for North Melbourne in which the club won its second VFL premiership against Collingwood, but Melrose did not take part in this game due to injury. Melrose played another sound season in 1978 and lined up in the forward pocket for North Melbourne in the Grand Final against Hawthorn which saw North Melbourne lose by 3 goals.

Melrose played out the 1979 VFL season before returning to Western Australia in 1980 where he joined the Swan Districts Football Club under his old mentor John Todd. Swan Districts had a great season but lost the 1980 grand final to South Fremantle by 58 points and Melrose played on a half forward flank. In 1981 Swan Districts made the second semi final but lost to Claremont by 27 points. Melrose played in the centre on this occasion and was rated as one of the best on ground.

Swan Districts ended their premiership drought in 1982 where they beat Claremont by 49 points. Melrose was awarded the Simpson Medal for his efforts on field where he had played on a half-back flank. Melrose was captain of the side in 1982 and co-captain with Keith Narkle in 1983. Swan Districts went to win the 1983 premiership but without Melrose playing. Retiring as a player in 1983 Melrose returned to Swan Districts as a coach for the 1995 and 1996 seasons; however owing to severe financial difficulties and the constant movement of players to and from the AFL, his first season was a disaster with a winless season looking likely for a long time before two late wins salvaged something. In 1996 Swan Districts produced some brilliant performances, including holding eventual premiers Claremont to one goal at Claremont Oval, but were so inconsistent as to win only nine games and again miss the top four.

Melrose was named in Swan Districts Team of the Century and the East Fremantle Team of the Century.
