= Charlie Strang =

Personal information
- Full name: Archibald Charles Strang
- Nickname: Charlie
- Born: 30 September 1916; Fremantle, Western Australia
- Died: 1 February 1992 (aged 75); Wanneroo, Western Australia

Playing career
Years	Club	Games (Goals)
1936–1937	South Fremantle	5 (5)
1938–1942, 1945	East Fremantle	64 (30)
1946	SouthFremantle	1 (0)

Coaching career
Years	Club	Games (W–L–D)
1953	East Fremantle	
1954–1955	Subiaco	

Career highlights
- WAFL Premiership player 1945; East Fremantle life member

Archibald Charles Strang (30 September 1916 – 1 February 1992) was an Australian football player and coach in the Western Australian Football League (WAFL).

== Early life ==
Strang was born to Amy (née Beresford) and Archibald William Strang in Fremantle, Western Australia.

Strang began his junior football career playing with Fremantle Ex-Scholars Football Club and Yarloop Football Club.

== Football career ==
Although his father Archie had played 241 games for East Fremantle Football Club and was a life member, Strang made his seniors debut in 1936 with South Fremantle Football Club due to living in their recruiting district. While Strang was spoken of as one of Western Australia's foremost juniors he only managed 5 games over two seasons due to injuries.

In 1938 an exchange of players allowed Strang to play for East Fremantle Football Club. In five seasons for East Fremantle Strang played 64 games and kicked 30 goals.

His footballing career was interrupted by the Second World War where between 1942 and 1945 Strang served in the Royal Australian Air Force as a Fight Sergeant.

He returned to play for East Fremantle in the 1945 WAFL premiership before playing one game for South Fremantle in 1946 and retiring from football.

Strang went on to coach East Fremantle in 1953 and Subiaco Football Club in 1954 and 1955.

Strang is life member of the East Fremantle Football Club.

== Personal life ==
Strang married Daphne Smith in Fremantle in 1940.

Strang died in Wanneroo on 1 February 1992.
