= Ray Sorrell =

Australian rules footballer (born 1938)

Personal information
- Full name: Ray George Sorrell
- Born: 1 January 1938 (age 88)
- Original team: North Fremantle juniors
- Position: Centreman

Playing career^{1}
| Years | Club | Games (Goals) |
| 1956–63, 1967–68 | East Fremantle | 156 (56) |
| 1964–1965 | South Fremantle | 22 (8) |
| Total | | 178 (64) |

Coaching career
| Years | Club | Games (W–L–D) |
| 1964–1965 | South Fremantle | 42 (12–29–1) |
- ^{1} Playing statistics correct to the end of 1968.

Ray George Sorrell (born 1 January 1938) is a former Australian rules footballer who played with East Fremantle and South Fremantle in the West Australian National Football League (WANFL).

A left-footed centreman, Sorrell achieved many accolades during his time at East Fremantle. He was a dual Sandover Medal winner, finishing equal first with Neville Beard in 1961 and then winning the award outright in 1963. The 1961 medal was given to Beard on countback but Sorrell was awarded it retrospectively in the 1990s when the league decided to reward those who had lost in a similar fashion. He was also a dual Simpson Medalist, winning both in 1962, one for being best on ground in the Grand Final that year and the other for performance against Tasmania in their interstate match. In total he represented the West Australians at interstate football on 18 occasions during his career and was named in two All-Australian teams, in 1958 and 1961.

Sorrell was noted for his vision and anticipation, frequently using drop kicks to create opportunities for his forwards.

Sorrell controversially joined arch-rival South Fremantle as captain-coach in 1964 and spent two seasons with them with little on-field success (second-last and last) before returning to East Fremantle where he finished his 178-game WANFL career.

In 1997 he was named on the wing in East Fremantle's Team of the Century and in 2007 he was named in the centre in the Fremantle Team of Legends. In 2016 Sorrell was inducted into the Australian Football Hall of Fame, after being an inaugural inductee in the West Australian Football Hall of Fame in 2004.

His grandsons, Harrison and Jonathon Marsh, previously played for the Sydney Swans and Collingwood/St. Kilda respectively.
