= Percy Johnson =

Australian rules footballer and coach (1933–2021)

Personal information
- Full name: Percy John Johnson
- Born: 28 January 1933
- Died: 4 December 2021 (aged 88)
- Original team: Aquinas College

Playing career^{1}
Years	Club	Games (Goals)
1951–58, 1962	East Fremantle	180 (217)
1959	Swan Districts	21 (19)
1960–1961	Claremont	27 (45)
Total		228 (281)

Coaching career
Years	Club	Games (W–L–D)
1959	Swan Districts	21 (5–16–0)
1977	South Fremantle	21 (12–9–0)
1978–1979	West Perth	31 (14–17–0)
- ^{1} Playing statistics correct to the end of 1962.

Career highlights
- East Fremantle premiership player 1957; Claremont leading goalkicker 1960

Percy John Johnson (28 January 1933 – 4 December 2021) was an Australian rules footballer and coach, who played 13 state matches for Western Australia and 228 games in the Western Australian National Football League (WANFL). He is a member of the West Australian Football Hall of Fame.

== Biography ==
Johnson was raised in the Goldfields, and learnt football at Aquinas College under Jerry Dolan where he was used at centre-half back or as a forward. In 1951, he joined East Fremantle, where he became a ruckman due to a large number of quality defenders at the club. Johnson debuted for Western Australia against Victoria in 1955. In 1957, he won the WANFL premiership with East Fremantle.

In 1959, Johnson became captain-coach of Swan Districts, but after the club failed to progress – falling from six wins in 1958 to five – he fell out of favour with the committee and was replaced by Charlie Doig. He played a total of 21 games in his sole season for the Swans before moving to Claremont in 1960, where he was the club's leading goalscorer for the year. He returned to East Fremantle for one last season in 1962, his final game being the grand final loss to Swans.

After football, Johnson became a respected television critic, working for Channel 7 on their World of Football show, where he had his own slot "Percys Point of View". He was appointed senior coach at South Fremantle, somewhat out of the blue in 1977, after doing some junior coaching. The following season, he accepted a two-year contract to coach West Perth, being sacked during his second season after the Cardinals had their worst losing run since their WANFL record streak in 1938 and 1939. In recent years he has been ruck coach at Fremantle and Swan Districts and has been involved in WAFL or AFL football for more than 60 years.

In 2010, he was inducted into the West Australian Football Hall of Fame.

Johnson died at the age of 88 on 4 December 2021 after a 12-month cancer battle.
