= David Hollins =

Australian rules footballer

Personal information
- Full name: David Costley Hollins
- Born: 15 February 1951 (age 75)
- Original team: South Bunbury

Playing career^{1}
Years	Club	Games (Goals)
1970–1980	East Fremantle	189 (249)
- ^{1} Playing statistics correct to the end of 1980.

David John Hollins (born 15 February 1951) is a former Australian rules footballer who played 189 games for East Fremantle in the WANFL during the 1970s.

Hollins, who favoured the drop kick, played as both a centreman and on-baller. Recruited to East Fremantle from South Bunbury, Hollins won a Sandover Medal in 1971 and was a member of their premiership team three years later. He was also East Fremantle's Club Champion that year and again in 1975.

He represented Western Australia in interstate football at the 1972 Perth Carnival and 1975 Knockout Carnival for a total of five games.
