= Lin Richards =

Australian rules footballer, born 1909

Personal information
- Full name: Lindsay Gordon Richards
- Born: 27 March 1909; Boulder, Western Australia
- Died: 25 April 1992 (aged 83); Frankston, Victoria
- Original team: Boulder City (Goldfields)
- Height: 180 cm (5 ft 11 in)
- Weight: 82 kg (181 lb)

Playing career^{1}
| Years | Club | Games (Goals) |
| 1929–1931 | East Fremantle | 59 (5) |
| 1932–1933 | Boulder City | |
| 1934–1936 | South Melbourne | 39 (0) |
- ^{1} Playing statistics correct to the end of 1936.

Lindsay Richards (27 March 1909 – 25 April 1992) was an Australian rules footballer who played for East Fremantle in the West Australian Football League (WAFL) and South Melbourne in the Victorian Football League (VFL). He is a member of the interchange bench in East Fremantle's official 'Team of the Century' which was announced in 1997.

Originally from Boulder in the Goldfields League, Richards first played with East Fremantle in 1927 and by 1929 had established himself in the side. A centre half back, he played in premiership teams in 1929, 1930 and 1931. He won a Sandover Medal in 1931 to become the first ever player from East Fremantle to claim the award.

Richards joined South Melbourne in 1934 as one of many interstate recruits to the club during that period and he went on to play in three losing grand finals.

Richards later served in the Australian Army during World War II.
