= Norm Rogers (Australian rules footballer) =

Australian rules footballer

Personal information
- Full name: Norman Angus Rogers
- Born: 7 May 1937 (age 89)
- Position: Defender

Playing career
| Years | Club | Games (Goals) |
| 1956–1968 | East Fremantle | 234 (36) |

Career highlights
- All-Australian - 1958; East Fremantle premiership player - 1957 & 1965; Simpson Medal - 1964

Norman Angus "Norm" Rogers (born 7 May 1937) is a former Australian rules footballer who played for East Fremantle in the West Australian National Football League (WANFL) during the 1950s and 1960s.

Rogers was predominantly a defender and spent most of his time across half back. In 1959 he won East Fremantle's 'Best and Fairest' award and was a member of their premiership teams of 1957 and 1965. For his performance in the losing 1964 Grand Final to Claremont, Rogers won a Simpson Medal.

He had a long interstate career with Western Australia and appeared in 27 matches at that level. He was awarded with a spot in the All-Australian team which was named following the conclusion of the 1958 Melbourne Carnival.

The defender was non playing coach of East Fremantle in 1967 and 1968. He was later named as a half back flanker in the Fremantle Team of Legends.
