= David Christy =

Australian rules footballer

David "Dolly" Christy
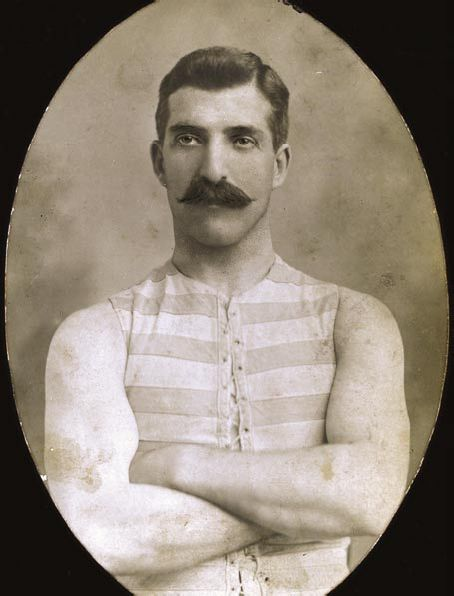

Personal information
- Full name: David Christy
- Born: 3 July 1869; Ballarat, Victoria
- Died: 2 July 1919 (aged 49); Adelaide, South Australia
- Original team: Ballarat
- Positions: Ruckman, centre half-forward

Playing career^{1}
Years	Club	Games (Goals)
1886–1888	Ballarat	44 (18)
1891–1896	Melbourne	88 (67)
1896–1897	Fremantle	11 (1)
1897	Imperials	6 (0)
1898–1912	East Fremantle	196 (191)
Total		345 (277)
- ^{1} Playing statistics correct to the end of 1912.

Career highlights
- Fremantle; Premiership player: 1896 (1); East Fremantle; Captain: 1898–1900; Premiership player: 1900, 1902-1904, 1906, 1908-1911 (9)

David "Dolly" Christy (3 July 1869 – 2 July 1919) was an Australian rules footballer in the Victorian Football Association (VFA) and the West Australian Football League (WAFL).

Christy was a highly successful ruckman and centre half-forward, who was also one of the founders of football in Western Australia. He began his career at the age of 16 with Ballarat, who resigned from the VFA in 1888; after two years of local premiership matches, he crossed to Melbourne in the VFA, playing there from 1891 until 1896.

He later became a driving force in establishing football in Western Australia, playing sixteen of his 25 seasons there. He played with Fremantle and with Imperials, and upon the latter club's dissolution, was a co-founder of the East Fremantle Football Club in 1898.

Christy retired midway through the 1912 season, two weeks before his 43rd birthday, and his career total of 345 premiership games remained an elite Australian rules football record until it was broken by Graham "Polly" Farmer in Round 11 of the 1971 WANFL season: Farmer retired at the end of that season with 356 premiership games.

Christy also played 20 intercolonial/interstate football matches for Victoria and Western Australia; if these are considered, then he played a total of 365 senior career games, which remained an elite Australian rules football record until it was broken by Farmer in Round 13 of 1970.

Christy's 25 career seasons and ten career premierships (equal with Alfred "Topsy" Waldron) are both records for elite Australian rules football as of 2026: given the nature of the modern game, these records are exceedingly unlikely to ever be broken.

In 1996, Christy was inducted into the Australian Football Hall of Fame, and in 2004 he was inducted to the WA Football Hall of Fame.
