= Doug Green (footballer) =

Australian rules footballer

Personal information
- Full name: Douglas Burkett Green
- Born: 28 October 1951 (age 75)
- Original team: East Fremantle JFC
- Height: 189 cm (6 ft 2 in)
- Weight: 83 kg (183 lb)

Playing career^{1}
Years	Club	Games (Goals)
1970–79, 1981	East Fremantle	181 (0)
1980	South Melbourne	6 (0)
- ^{1} Playing statistics correct to the end of 1981.

Career highlights
- 1973 Lynn Medal; 1974, 1979 East Fremantle premiership player; Western Australian state captain

Doug Green (born 28 October 1951) is a former Australian rules footballer who played for East Fremantle in the WANFL during the 1970s. He also spent a season with South Melbourne in the Victorian Football League.

Green, a defender, was used mostly across half back from his East Fremantle debut in 1970. He won a Lynn Medal in 1973 as East Fremantle's 'Best and fairest' player and finished runner-up in the award on six occasions over the course of his career. Green was at centre half back in their 1974 premiership side and became club captain in 1975, replacing Graham Melrose. He played in his second premiership in 1979, with the Grand Final being his last game for East Fremantle.

Despite announcing his retirement in 1979, he was lured back into action by South Melbourne whom he joined halfway through the 1980 VFL season.

Green regularly represented Western Australia at interstate level with a total of 14 appearances to his name. He made his debut at the 1972 Perth Carnival and within three years was captain of his state, a position he would hold at the 1975 Knockout Carnival.

In 1997, Green was named as a half back flanker in East Fremantle's official 'Team of the Century'. He is also a member of the Fremantle Football Hall of Legends and in 2007 was included on the interchange bench of the Fremantle Team of Legends.
