= Carlisle Jarvis =

Australian rules footballer, born 1906

Personal information
- Full name: Carlisle Melrose Byron Jarvis
- Born: 10 December 1906; East Fremantle, Western Australia
- Died: 6 November 1979 (aged 72); Mount Lawley, Western Australia

Playing career^{1}
Years	Club	Games (Goals)
1924–1937	East Fremantle	163 (18)
- ^{1} Playing statistics correct to the end of 1937.

Carlisle Melrose Byron Jarvis (10 December 1906 – 6 November 1979) was an Australian rules footballer at East Fremantle in the West Australian National Football League (WANFL).

Jarvis spent twelve seasons with East Fremantle where he was a specialist defender. "Bub" Jarvis had his best year in 1934 where he was runner up in the Sandover Medal count and won a Lynn Medal. He played in seven East Fremantle premiership sides and represented the Western Australian interstate team on eight occasions. In the 1932–33 summer he played a first-class cricket match for his state, making three runs and taking two catches.

He was selected, in 2007, as a half back flanker in the Fremantle Team of Legends.
