= 2023 WAFL Women's season =

- Teams: 8
- Premiers: East Fremantle; 2nd premiership
- Minor premiers: Claremont; 1st minor premiership
- Best and fairest: Jayme Harken; Claremont
- Leading goalkicker: Adele Arnup; Claremont (26 goals)
- Matches played: 56

The 2023 WAFL Women's season was the fifth season of the WAFL Women's (WAFLW). The season commenced on 11 March and concluded with the Grand Final on 15 July 2023. East Perth made their debut in the competition, increasing the number of participating clubs in the league to eight, and marking the first season to include all eight stand-alone clubs from the West Australian Football League (WAFL).

== Clubs ==
- Claremont, East Fremantle, East Perth, Peel Thunder
- South Fremantle, Subiaco, Swan Districts, West Perth

Seven clubs from 2021 return to the competition, with East Perth joining the league for the first time.

== Ladder ==
| Pos | Team | Pld | W | L | D | PF | PA | PP | Pts | Qualification |
|---|---|---|---|---|---|---|---|---|---|---|
| 1 | Claremont | 14 | 13 | 0 | 1 | 631 | 170 | 371.2 | 54 | Finals series |
| 2 | South Fremantle | 14 | 10 | 3 | 1 | 693 | 316 | 219.3 | 42 | Finals series |
| 3 | East Fremantle (P) | 14 | 8 | 5 | 1 | 548 | 302 | 181.5 | 34 | Finals series |
| 4 | Swan Districts | 14 | 8 | 6 | 0 | 603 | 441 | 136.7 | 32 | Finals series |
| 5 | Subiaco | 14 | 7 | 6 | 1 | 485 | 313 | 155.0 | 30 | |
| 6 | West Perth | 14 | 5 | 9 | 0 | 331 | 551 | 60.1 | 20 | |
| 7 | Peel Thunder | 14 | 3 | 11 | 0 | 253 | 679 | 37.3 | 12 | |
| 8 | East Perth | 14 | 0 | 14 | 0 | 115 | 887 | 13.0 | 0 | |

Source: australianfootball.com WAFL
Rules for classification: 1) points; 2) percentage; 3) number of points for.
(P) Premiers

== Finals series ==
=== Semi-finals ===
| | First Semi-Final |
| Sunday, 2 July (12:00 pm) | East Fremantle 7.4 (46) | def. | Swan Districts 2.5 (17) | Fremantle Community Bank Oval | Report |

| | Second Semi-Final |
| Sunday, 2 July (2:00 pm) | Claremont 4.5 (29) | def. | South Fremantle 2.1 (13) | Revo Fitness Stadium | Report |

=== Preliminary final ===
| | Preliminary Final |
| Sunday, 9 July (3:15 pm) | South Fremantle 3.4 (22) | def. by | East Fremantle 7.3 (45) | Fremantle Community Bank Oval | Report |

=== Grand Final ===
2023 WAFLW Grand Final
15 July 2023 (2:45 pm) | Claremont | def. by | East Fremantle | Mineral Resources Park (crowd: 4,000) | Stats; Report
1.0 (6); 1.1 (7); 2.2 (14); 2.2 (14) | Q1; Q2; Q3; Final | 1.1 (7); 3.1 (19); 3.2 (20); 4.2 (26) | Lou Knitter Medal (Best on ground): Zippy Fish (East Fremantle); Television broadcast: Seven Network
R Ortlepp, B Anderson 1 | Goals | C Reilly 2 G Cleaver, M Leitch 1
C Ortlepp, K Orme | Best | Z Fish, C Reilly, L Catherine

== Awards ==
- Dhara Kerr Award

Jayme Harken (Claremont)

- WAFLW Joanne Huggins Leading Goal Kicker Award

Adele Arnup (Claremont)

- WAFLW Cath Boyce Rookie of the Year Award

Evie Cowcher (Note: Originally presented to Renee Morgan in error.) (Peel Thunder)

- Coach of the Year

Craig McNaughton (South Fremantle)

- Rogers Cup Fairest and Best

Mia Russo (West Perth)

- Rogers Cup Leading Goal Kicker

Nicole Taylor-Thorpe (South Fremantle)

- Rogers Cup Premiers

West Perth
