= Jerry Dolan =

Australian politician

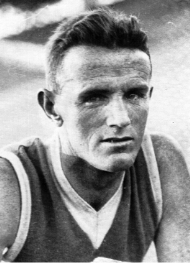

Personal information
- Full name: John Dolan
- Born: 25 December 1901; Victoria Park, Perth
- Died: 26 December 1986 (aged 85)
- Original team: Kalgoorlie City
- Position: Forward

Playing career^{1}
Years	Club	Games (Goals)
1923–33	East Fremantle	166 (?)

Coaching career
Years	Club	Games (W–L–D)
1930, 1932–33	East Fremantle	
1934–38	East Perth	
1941–48, 1950	East Fremantle	
- ^{1} Playing statistics correct to the end of 1933.

John "Jerry" Dolan (25 December 1901 – 26 December 1986) was an Australian rules footballer and coach in the West Australian Football League (WAFL) before becoming a politician. He played for as well as coached East Fremantle and was also a coach at East Perth. After leaving football, Dolan served as a member of the Western Australian Legislative Council.

Dolan originally played in the Goldfields Football Association with Kalgoorlie City and was recruited to East Fremantle after two seasons. He was used mostly as a centre half forward in his time at East Fremantle and participated in their 1925, 1928, 1929 and 1931 premiership teams. Dolan also played in their 1930 and 1933 premiership sides, as captain-coach.

He represented Western Australia at the 1924 Hobart Carnival and captain-coached his state in the 1933 Sydney Carnival. Once his playing career ended, Dolan coached Western Australia at interstate football, from 1946 to 1949.

As non-playing coach, Dolan steered East Fremantle to a premiership in the 1943 under-age competition and to back to back flags in 1945 and 1946. He also coached East Perth to a premiership in 1936.

His overall coaching win–loss record stood at 68.2% when he retired, bettered only by Phil Matson when comparing it to other long standing coaches in the league. Both East Fremantle and East Perth never failed to play finals when Dolan was coach. In winning the 1946 premiership, Dolan's East Fremantle side went through the season undefeated, the only occasion this has been done by a WAFL team in the 20th century.

Secretary of the East Fremantle ALP branch for many years, Dolan seldom missed a party meeting. He had frequent contact with John Curtin and as early as 1933 was campaign manager for John Tonkin. As a Labor Party candidate, Dolan was elected into the Western Australian Legislative Council in 1963. He had won the West Province by-election, which came about when sitting member Evan Davies died. Dolan held various portfolios in the Tonkin Ministry. He served as minister for Police, Transport and Railways from March 1971 to May 1973. During his stint in parliament, which ended in 1974, he was also briefly the Leader of the Government in the Legislative Council.

In 1986, the year of his death, Dolan was inducted into the Western Australian Hall of Champions, honouring his contribution to Australian rules football. He was named as coach of East Fremantle's Team of the Century in 1997. He was one of the inaugural inductees into the West Australian Football Hall of Fame in 2004 and in 2007 was named as coach of the Fremantle Team of Legends. He was an inaugural legend in the East Fremantle Football Club Hall of Fame.

== Personal life ==
In December 1932, Dolan married Eileen Foley.
