= Bill Faul =

Australian rules footballer (1909–1974)

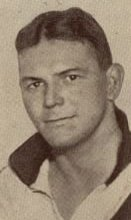

Personal information
- Full name: William John Faul
- Born: 8 June 1909; Boulder, Western Australia
- Died: 14 September 1974 (aged 65)
- Original team: Wembley
- Height: 179 cm (5 ft 10 in)
- Weight: 83 kg (183 lb)

Playing career^{1}
Years	Club	Games (Goals)
1929–1931	Subiaco	71
1932–1938	South Melbourne	117 (2)
Total		188 (73)

Coaching career
Years	Club	Games (W–L–D)
1939–1941, 1949–1952	Prahran (VFA)	149
1948, 1953–1956	Northcote (VFA)	101
1957–1959	Moorabbin (VFA)	63
1960–1961	South Melbourne	36 (12–24–0)
- ^{1} Playing statistics correct to the end of 1938.

Career highlights
- VFL Premiership player: (1933); South Melbourne Best & Fairest: (1932)

William John Faul (8 June 1909 – 14 September 1974) was an Australian rules footballer who played for the South Melbourne Football Club in the Victorian Football League (VFL) and for the Subiaco Football Club in the Western Australian National Football League (WANFL).

== Family ==
The son of Albert Ernest Faul (1882–1963) and Mary Faul (–1946), née Roberts, he was born at Boulder, Western Australia, on 8 June 1909. He married Joan Mary Millie on 4 August 1934.

== Football ==
A defender, Faul crossed from Subiaco to South Melbourne in 1932 and finished second in the Brownlow Medal. He won the club's Best and Fairest award in the same year.

He was one of a number of South Melbourne players who were given immediate, long-term, secure, paid employment outside of football within the (137 store) grocery empire of the South Melbourne president, South Melbourne Lord Mayor, and Member of the Victorian Legislative Council, Archie Crofts. The collection of players recruited from interstate in 1932/1933 become known as South Melbourne's "Foreign Legion".

In 1939, Faul crossed to Victorian Football Association club Prahran without a clearance, serving as playing coach. Faul played for and coached Prahran until the end of 1941.

After World War II, Faul served as non-playing coach, first of Northcote, then later of Moorabbin. In fifteen seasons of senior coaching (including his time at Prahran), Faul coached 313 games this was the VFA/VFL record until 2014, when passed by Gerard FitzGerald.

Faul also coached Association representative teams in Interstate Carnivals. He returned to South Melbourne in 1960 to coach the club for two seasons.

He was named in the half back line in South Melbourne/Sydney's 'Team of the Century'.

In 2003 he was selected in Prahran's Team of the Century.
