= Jack Clarke (footballer, born 1931) =

Australian rules footballer

Personal information
- Full name: John Kildahl Clarke
- Nickname: Stork
- Born: 26 June 1931
- Died: 23 March 1997 (aged 65)
- Height: 193 cm (6 ft 4 in)
- Weight: 89 kg (196 lb)
- Position: Ruckman

Playing career^{1}
Years	Club	Games (Goals)
1952–1962	East Fremantle	206 (6)

Representative team honours^{2}
Years	Team	Games (Goals)
1952–1962	Western Australia	26

Coaching career^{3}
Years	Club	Games (W–L–D)
1961	East Fremantle	2 (1)
- ^{1} Playing statistics correct to the end of 1962.^{2} Representative statistics correct as of 1962.^{3} Coaching statistics correct as of 1961.

John Kildahl "Stork" Clarke (26 June 1931 – 23 March 1997) was an Australian rules footballer in the Western Australian National Football League (WANFL).

== Football ==
Clarke played as a ruckman for East Fremantle, making his debut in 1952. In 1957 he won the Sandover Medal as the fairest and best player in the league as well as playing in a premiership-winning team.

Clarke played 206 games for East Fremantle, plus 26 state games for Western Australia in the period 1952 to 1962. He was named in four All-Australian teams – 1953, 1956, 1958 and 1961.

== Career highlights ==
- Played 206 games for East Fremantle
- Coached 2 games for East Fremantle (1961)
- Captained East Fremantle in 1961
- Sandover Medallist 1957
- East Fremantle fairest and best 1956, 1960, 1961
- Premiership with East Fremantle in 1957
- 25 state games for Western Australia
- State captain 1958-1960
- All-Australian 1953, 1956, 1958, 1961

== Hall of Fame ==
=== Australian Football Hall of Fame ===
In 1998 Jack Clarke was inducted into the Australian Football Hall of Fame.

=== West Australian Football Hall of Fame ===
In 2004 he was inducted to the WA Football Hall of Fame.

== See also ==
- 1953 Adelaide Carnival
- 1956 Perth Carnival
- 1958 Melbourne Carnival
- 1961 Brisbane Carnival
