= Brian Peake =

Australian rules footballer (born 1953)

Brian Peake OAM

Personal information
- Full name: Brian Francis Peake
- Nickname: Bomber
- Born: 5 December 1953 (age 72); South Perth, Western Australia
- Original team: Manning JFC
- Height: 180 cm (5 ft 11 in)
- Weight: 82 kg (181 lb)
- Position: Utility

Playing career^{1}
Years	Club	Games (Goals)
1972–1981, 1985–90	East Fremantle	296 (287)
1981–1984	Geelong	66 (49)
1990	Perth	10 (6)
Total		372 (342)

Representative team honours
Years	Team	Games (Goals)
1974–1977	WAFL	6 (2)
1978–1982, 1984–87	Western Australia	16 (14)
Total		22 (16)
- ^{1} Playing statistics correct to the end of 1990.

Career highlights
- East Fremantle captain 1979–1981, 1986–1987; 3 x WAFL premiership player 1974, 1979, 1985; East Fremantle best and fairest 1976–1980, 1987; Sandover Medal 1977; WA State of Origin captain 1979, 1980, 1986, 1987; All-Australian team 1979, 1980, 1986; All-Australian captain 1979, 1986; Tassie Medal 1979; Geelong captain 1982; West Australian Football Hall of Fame inductee 2004; Australian Football Hall of Fame inductee 2013

Brian Francis Peake OAM (born 5 December 1953) is a former Australian rules footballer who played for East Fremantle and Perth in the West Australian Football League (WAFL), and Geelong in the Victorian Football League (VFL). He also played State of Origin football for Western Australia from 1978 to 1987, captaining the side in 1979, 1980, 1986 and 1987. Peake was awarded the Medal of the Order of Australia in 1990 and was inducted into the West Australian Football Hall of Fame in 2004, and into the Australian Football Hall of Fame in 2013.

== WAFL career ==
The son of Laurie Peake, who played 89 games for East Fremantle, Peake was a versatile ruck-rover, half-forward flanker or centreman. Peake is of Māori heritage. He had a long and successful career with East Fremantle where he made his debut in 1972, playing in three premiership winning sides (1974, 1979 and 1985), winning a Sandover Medal in 1977 and captaining the All-Australian side in 1979 and 1986.

Peake played 296 premiership games for the Blue and Whites, and holds the record for six club Best and Fairests; after being controversially sacked with full support of the board by the Sharks three rounds into 1990, he moved on to Perth when no other WASFL club was interested in him. In his short career with the Demons, Peake played his 300th WAFL career premiership match before retiring after 372 career premiership matches in elite Australian rules football.

Peake has been named a WAFL Hall of Fame Legend.

== VFL career ==
After signing with Victorian Football League club Geelong in 1976, but choosing to remain in Western Australia, Peake finally transferred to Geelong midseason in 1981. Amidst much hype he was flown to Kardinia Park by helicopter for training where a crowd of 3000 fans awaited his arrival. In 1982 he was promoted to team captain after just 13 VFL games, although he gave up this position a year later to club game record holder Ian Nankervis. Widely regarded as one of the most in-form players in the country at the time, Peake was paid $1,000 a game (high by 1980s standards). After the 1984 season, Peake returned to Western Australia, where he continued to play for a further six seasons.

== Other matches ==
Peake also played nine night series matches for East Fremantle and 22 interstate matches for Western Australia, along with a night series match for Geelong (these are recognised as senior by the WAFL but not by the VFL/AFL).

If these matches are included, then Peake played a total of 404 senior career games, becoming the second West Australian behind Barry Cable to reach 400 senior career games, and equalling Cable's record for most career senior games played by any elite Australian rules football player born in Western Australia.

The VFL/AFL list Cable and Peake's total as 403, excluding their VFL/AFL night series match (Cable for North Melbourne and Peake for Geelong).
