= East Fremantle Football Club =

Australian rules football club in Western Australia

East Fremantle

Names
- Full name: East Fremantle Football Club
- Nickname(s): Sharks (1983-present); Old Easts (1906-1982)

2026 season
- After finals: 9th (WAFL); 1st (WAFLW)

Club details
- Founded: 1898; 128 years ago
- Colours: Blue, White
- Competition: West Australian Football League (men); WAFL Women's (women)
- President: Ennio Tavani
- CEO: Adrian Bromage
- Coach: Bill Monaghan (WAFL)
- Captain: Kyle Baskerville (WAFL)
- Premierships: List: WAFL (30): 1900, 1902, 1903, 1904, 1906, 1908, 1909, 1910, 1911, 1914, 1918, 1925, 1928, 1929, 1930, 1931, 1933, 1937, 1943, 1945, 1946, 1957, 1965, 1974, 1979, 1985, 1992, 1994, 1998, 2023; WAFLW (3): 2019, 2023, 2026
- Grounds: East Fremantle Oval (capacity: 20,000)
- WACA Ground (capacity: 15,000)

Uniforms
Home	Away

Other information
- Official website: effc.com.au

The East Fremantle Football Club, nicknamed the Sharks and colloquially referred to as East Freo, is an Australian rules football club playing in the West Australian Football League (WAFL) and WAFL Women's (WAFLW). The team's home ground is East Fremantle Oval. East Fremantle is the most successful club in WAFL history, winning 30 premierships since their entry into the competition in 1898. East Fremantle's last premiership was in 2023, when they defeated Peel Thunder.

== History ==
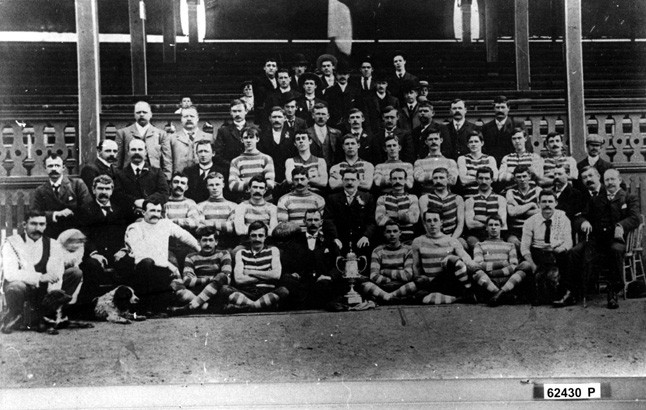
1903 premiership side

The increasing professionalism of teams in the Goldfields Football League attracted players away from Perth, which saw the Imperials Football Club collapse in 1897. Tom Wilson and David 'Dolly' Christy from the Imperials, along with businessman Sam Thomson, were instrumental in the foundation of the East Fremantle Football Club and its admission into the West Australian Football Association. The club adopted the Imperials' blue and white colours and many Imperials players would become part of the East Fremantle team in 1898. Other sources claim that the origin of the club's colours were from the North Melbourne Football Club at the suggestion of the club's first captain Tom Wilson had played for North in the Victorian Football Association. Wilson as captain and Christy as vice captain would play in East Fremantle's first game at the WACA on 11 May 1898.

Tragedy would strike the club in just its sixth year, with the death of prominent player James Gullan from accidental poisoning the day after their game against South Fremantle. During Gullan's time at East Fremantle he became regarded as one of the best players to ever play the game.

East Fremantle became known affectionately as 'Old East' or 'Old Easts' after the admission of East Perth to the competition in 1906. The nickname continued to be used until 1983, when the nickname of 'the Sharks' was adopted.

East Fremantle has a rivalry with its Port cousin, South Fremantle, and the Foundation Day Derby between the two sides is a much anticipated highlight of the local football calendar. East Fremantle's success has thus far eclipsed that of South Fremantle, who (as of 2021) have won 14 WAFL premierships.

Up until 1987, Western Australia was immersed in WAFL culture and East Fremantle enjoyed a strong following. In 1987, a Perth-based club – the West Coast Eagles – joined an expanded Victorian Football League. West Coast's initial squad of 32 players included six East Fremantle players and they were coached by former East Fremantle premiership player and coach, Ron Alexander. Interest in the semi-national competition saw attendances at WAFL games start to fall, with severe consequences for the club's support base and finances. By the middle 2000s, East Fremantle was in severe trouble on and off the field, winning only nineteen of eighty matches between 2003 and 2006 and suffering severe financial difficulties, though since then the club substantially recovered. The club endured a 25-year premiership drought before winning a thirtieth premiership in 2023. The Sharks once pulled on average 10,000 people to a home game. Now 1,500 people to a home game is considered a strong attendance.

East Fremantle was a foundation member of the WAFL Women's competition in 2019. They were the inaugural premiers of the competition, defeating Swan Districts in the grand final.

=== Team of the Century ===
In 1997 the East Fremantle Football Club named its Team of the Century, to coincide with the club centenary celebrations. The team includes many names that have become synonymous with East Fremantle.

East Fremantle Team of the Century
B:	George Mavor	Con Regan	Michael Brennan
HB:	Doug Green	Carlisle 'Bub' Jarvis	Norm Rogers
C:	Ray Sorrell	William 'Nipper' Truscott	Chris Mainwaring
HF:	Jack Sheedy (c)	George Prince	Alan Preen
F:	Vic French	George Doig	Alan Ebbs
Foll:	Jack Clarke	Brian Peake (vc)	Jim Conway
Int:	Graham Melrose	Lin Richards	David Hollins
Coach:	Jerry Dolan		

=== Fremantle Team of Legends ===
In 2007 the East Fremantle and South Fremantle football clubs came together to select the Fremantle Team of Legends. The Team consisted of players from East Fremantle and South Fremantle that had played at least 100 WAFL games for either club.

Fremantle Team of Legends
B:	Brad Hardie (SF)	Con Regan (EF)	Jack Clarke (EF)
HB:	Norm Rogers (EF)	Frank Jenkins (SF)	Carlisle 'Bub' Jarvis (EF)
C:	John Todd (SF)	Ray Sorrell (EF)	William 'Nipper' Truscott (EF)
HF:	Len Crabbe (SF)	John Gerovich (SF)	Maurice Rioli (SF)
F:	Jack Sheedy (EF) (c)	Bernie Naylor (SF)	George Doig (EF)
Foll:	Stephen Michael (SF)	Brian Peake (EF)	Steve Marsh (SF & EF) (c)
Int:	Doug Green (EF)	Tom Grljusich (SF)	Graham Melrose (EF)
Int:	Dave Woods (EF)		
Coach:	Jerry Dolan (EF)		

=== Club song ===
The East Fremantle team song is sung to the tune of "Notre Dame Victory March", which was adapted when the club changed its nickname from Old Easts to the Sharks in 1983.

Cheer, Cheer the Blue and the White
Honour the Sharks by day and by night
Lift that loyal banner high
Shake down the thunder from the sky
Whether the odds be great or be small
We will go in and win over all
While our players keep on fighting
Onwards to victory!

== Historical statistics ==
=== Club honours ===
Premierships
Competition	Level	Wins	Years won
West Australian Football League	Men's Seniors	30	1900, 1902, 1903, 1904, 1906, 1908, 1909, 1910, 1911, 1914, 1918, 1925, 1928, 1929, 1930, 1931, 1933, 1937, 1943, 1945, 1946, 1957, 1965, 1974, 1979, 1985, 1992, 1994, 1998, 2023
West Australian Football League	Women's Seniors	3	2019, 2023, 2026
West Australian Football League	Men's Reserves	14	1926, 1938, 1939, 1940, 1950, 1951, 1962, 1970, 1989, 1993, 1994, 2001, 2008, 2024
West Australian Football League	Colts (Boys U19)	11	1962, 1966, 1969, 1973, 1981, 1987, 1992, 1998, 2001, 2010, 2017
West Australian Football League	Rogers Cup (Girls U19)	1	2022
West Australian Football League	Fourths (1965–1974)	2	1972, 1974
Other titles and honours
Competition	Level	Wins	Years won
Rodriguez Shield	Multiple	7	1957, 1977, 1985, 1996, 1997, 1998, 2023
State Premiership	Men's Seniors (1902–1924)	5	1902, 1904, 1906, 1909, 1910
Finishing positions
Competition	Level	Wins	Years won
West Australian Football League	Minor premiership (men's seniors)	34	1900, 1902, 1903, 1904, 1907, 1908, 1909, 1910, 1911, 1914, 1916, 1917, 1921, 1924, 1928, 1929, 1930, 1931, 1932, 1933, 1934, 1936, 1938, 1941, 1945, 1946 (undefeated), 1954, 1958, 1964, 1974, 1985, 1992, 1998, 2023
West Australian Football League	Runners-up (men's seniors)	29	1899, 1901, 1905, 1907, 1912, 1916, 1917, 1919, 1920, 1921, 1923, 1924, 1934, 1938, 1939, 1941, 1944, 1954, 1955, 1958, 1962, 1963, 1964, 1977, 1984, 1986, 1997, 2000, 2012
West Australian Football League	Wooden spoons (men's seniors)	4	1898, 2004, 2006, 2018
West Australian Football League	Minor premiership (women's seniors)	2	2022, 2024
West Australian Football League	Runners-up (women's seniors)	2	2022, 2024

=== Club Records ===
Highest Score: Round 17, 1944 – 33.23 (221) vs. South Fremantle at Fremantle Oval

Lowest Score: Round 13, 1898 – 1.2 (8) vs. West Perth at The WACA

Greatest Winning Margin: Round 17, 1944 – 201 points vs. South Fremantle at Fremantle Oval

Greatest Losing Margin: Round 10, 1981 – 178 points vs. West Perth at Leederville Oval

Most games: Brian Peake 304 (1972–1981 & 1985–1989)

Most goals: George Doig 1,111

Record Home Attendance: Round 3, 1979 – 21,317 vs. South Fremantle

Record Finals Attendance: 1979 Grand Final – 52,781 vs. South Fremantle at Subiaco Oval

Most consecutive victories: 35, between 28 July 1945 (Round 13) and 17 May 1947 (Round 3), including the 1945 and 1946 premierships

Most consecutive losses: 13, once between 18 May 1968 (Round 7) and 17 August 1968 (Round 19) and again between 11 April 1970 (Round 2) and 11 July 1970 (Round 14)

== Players ==
There continue to be players from East Fremantle who move onto AFL/VFL, and AFLW playing careers, see List of East Fremantle footballers who have played in the VFL/AFL.

=== Individual honours ===
Sandover Medal: (13 total) – Lin Richards (1931), Jim Conway (1950), Jack Clarke (1957), Ray Sorrell (1961, 1963), David Hollins (1971), Graham Melrose (1974), Brian Peake (1977), Murray Wrensted (1985), Craig Treleven (1995), Adrian Bromage (1998), Rory O'Brien (2013), Blaine Boekhorst (2022)

Simpson Medal (in Grand Final): (11 total) – Alan Ebbs (1945), Frank Conway (1957), Ray Sorrell (1962), Norm Rogers (1964), Dave Imrie (1965), Gary Gibellini (1974), Kevin Taylor (1979), Clinton Browning (1992), Mark Amaranti (1994), Adrian Bromage (1998), Milan Murdock (2023)

Simpson Medal (in State Game): (7 total) – Ray Sorrell (1962), Kevin Taylor (1982), Paul Harding (1991), Craig Treleven (1995), Rod Tregenza (1999), Milan Murdock (2024, 2025)

Bernie Naylor Medal: (20 total) – Ernest Kelly (1904, 38 goals), Henry Sharpe (1905, 50 goals), Henry Sharpe (1907, 48 goals), Charles Doig (1908, 26 goals), Charles Doig (1909, 38 goals), Arthur Rawlinson (1917, 46 goals), Joseph Lawn (1919, 55 goals), Dinney Coffey (1923, 36 goals), George Doig (1933, 106 goals), George Doig (1934, 152 goals), George Doig (1935, 113 goals), George Doig (1936, 109 goals), George Doig (1937, 144 goals), George Doig (1941, 141 goals), George Prince (1949, 82 goals), Bob Johnson (1966, 92 goals), Kevin Taylor (1979, 102 goals), Neil Lester-Smith (1989, 90 goals), Rod Tregenza (1999, 86 goals), Rod Tregenza (2000, 86 goals)

Prendergast Medal: (10 total) – Bill Taggart (1954), Joe Angel (1977), Kevin Taylor (1978), Jon Stagg (1994), Leigh Willison (2002), Morgan Cooper (2007), Conor Davidson (2008), James Murray (2010), Timothy Viney (2011), Benjamin Harding (2017)

Jack Clarke Medal: (7 total) – Mark Amaranti (1985), Graham Ralph (1989), Matthew Cremin (2000), Andrew Green (2001), Jacob Green (2013), Joshua Browne (2021), Declan Pauline (2024)

Chesson Medallists: (2 total) – Greg Brown (1972), Doug Winning (1973)

All-Australian team: Jack Clarke (1953, 1956, 1958, 1961), Alan Preen (1958), Norm Rogers (1958), Ray Sorrell (1958, 1961), Brian Peake (1979 (c), 1980, 1986 (c)), Tony Buhagiar (1979), Kevin Taylor (1983), Peter Wilson (1986)

Tassie Medal: Brian Peake (1979)

=== 2022 squad ===
East Fremantle Football Club personnel
Senior list		Coaching staff
2 Alexander Montauban; 3 Tom Joyce; 4 James Spadanuda; 5 Max Murphy; 6 Harrison Marsh; 7 Cameron Eardley; 8 Griffin Vladich; 9 Jack Avery; 10 Jonathon Marsh; 11 Jack Cocking; 12 Reuben McGuire; 13 Kyle Baskerville (c); 14 Oskar Smartt; 15 Phoenix Knight; 16 Austin Ball; 17 Lennon Marlin; 18 Luke Carrello; 19 Jack Cleaver; 20 Luke Strnadica; 22 Louis Wilson; 23 Lachlan Bailey; 24 Jarrad Jansen; 25 Oliver McManus; 26 Kobe Austin; 27 Jackson McManus; 28 Noah Dean; 29 Zachary Rankin; 30 Liam Robinson; 31 Declan Pauline; 32 Elijah Stockden	33 Joel Budarick; 34 Elijah Burrows; 35 Tom Grylls; 36 Eric Benning; 37 Harry Pickett; 38 Toby Alker; 39 Nathan Dowsett; 40 Jye Sander; 41 Ashton Warner; 42 Bailey Morgan; 43 Kaiden Summerell; 44 Zac Petersen; 45 Presley Campbell; 46 Jake Boniwell; 47 Kaydn Wilson; 48 Jaxon Graham; 49 Ezra Jones; 50 William Wolf; 51 Harry Cox; 52 Jaxan Bibaeff; 53 Tom Phillips; 54 Harper Fox; 55 Lucas Clarkson; 56 Joshua Nomlatyu; 57 Muoteer Reech; 58 Chadd Dunscombe; 59 Blake Luxton; 61 Riaz Mohammad; 62 Rhama Evans; 63 Rhyder O'Brien	Head coach: Bill Monaghan; Assistant coaches: Craig Smoker; Adam Dancey; Legend: (c) Captain(s); (vc) Vice-captain(s); Long-term injury list; Upgraded rookie(s); (vet) Veterans list; Updated: July 2026; Source(s): Playing list, Coaching staff

=== Australian Football Hall of Fame ===
The Australian Football Hall of Fame was established in 1996.

Ten former East Fremantle players have been inducted: Simon Black (2020), David Christy (1996), Jack Clarke (1999), George Doig (2002), Bob Johnson (2012), Steve Marsh (2006), Brian Peake (2013), Jack Sheedy (2001), Ray Sorrell (2016) and William "Nipper" Truscott (1996). East Fremantle's 1974 premiership coach, John Todd, was inducted in 2003.

=== West Australian Football Hall of Fame ===
The West Australian Football Hall of Fame was created in 2002 and the first induction took place in 2004.

Twenty-three former East Fremantle players and coaches have been inducted: Ron Alexander (2004), Simon Black (2017), David Christy (2004), Jack Clarke (2004), Charles Doig (2017), George Doig (2004), Jerry Dolan (2004), Doug Green (2006), Paul Hasleby (2015), Percy Johnson (2010), Chris Mainwaring (2005), Steve Malaxos (2005), Steve Marsh (2004), Gerard Neesham (2005), Brian Peake (2004), Con Regan (2015), Norm Rogers (2004), Jack Sheedy (2004), Ray Sorrell (2004), John Todd (2004), William "Nipper" Truscott (2004) and Shane Woewodin (2022). Charles Sweetman (2009)

Five have been elevated to Legend status: George Doig (2004), Steve Marsh (2005), Jack Sheedy (2005), John Todd (2004) and William "Nipper" Truscott (2004).

=== EFFC Hall of Fame ===
On Saturday 2 June 2012, 52 individuals were inducted into the inaugural East Fremantle Football Club Hall of Fame. Nine inductees were also given 'Legend' status. Only players, officials and volunteers that served the club between 1898 and 1986 were deemed worthy to be inducted.

== Roll of honour ==
At the outbreak of World War I many players from Western Australia enlisted in the armed services, East Fremantle Football Club players killed in action include:

- Corporal Percy Sutherland MOFFLIN (10th Light Horse), KIA, Gallipoli, 16 June 1915
- Private Roy James 'Nugget' WRIGHTSON (11th Battn), KIA, Armentières, 30 May 1916
- Private John Alexander Robertson 'Hooky' DOIG (44th Battn), KIA, Messines, 31 July 1917
- Gunner John 'Jack' McCARTHY (36th Heavy Artillery), KIA, Ypres, 4 October 1917
- Private Arthur Henry 'Cock' WRIGHTSON (48th Battn), KIA, Passchendaele, 12 October 1917

== Board and Staff ==
- President: Ennio Tavani
- CEO: Adrian Bromage
- General Manager of Football Operations: Shane Woewodin

== See also ==
- Wikipedia listing of East Fremantle Football Club players
