= 2008 WAFL Grand Final =

The 2008 West Australian Football League (WAFL) Grand Final was the culmination of the 124th season of the premier Australian rules football league in Western Australia. It was played at Subiaco Oval on 20 September 2008 and was won by the Subiaco Football Club, who defeated the Swan Districts Football Club by 57 points.

== Background ==
Subiaco had dominated the 2008 season as no team in a major Australian Rules League had since Port Adelaide in the 1914 SAFL season. After twenty home-and-away games the Lions had lost just one game by the narrowest of margins to their Grand Final rivals in mid-season, with the closest any other opponent got to them being eighteen points. The Lions were targeting their third straight WAFL flag, and their fourth in just five years, all the while finishing an unprecedented seven and a half games clear of second-placed West Perth.

Swan Districts had finished fourth at the end of the season and had beat two higher ranked opponents in South Fremantle and West Perth to get to this match. The game showcased numerous young players who were to be drafted in the upcoming 2008 AFL draft including Nic Naitanui, Chris Yarran, Clancee Pearce, Todd Banfield, Daniel Rich, Adam Cockie and Greg Broughton.

== Teams ==
=== Subiaco ===
FB:	Greg Broughton	Caine Hayes	Darren Rumble
HB:	Robert Forrest	Aidan Parker	Jordan Adamson-Holmes
C:	Jarrad Schofield	Adam Cockie	Chad Cossom
HF:	Kyal Horsley	David Mapleston	Phil Read
FF:	Chris Hall	Brad Smith	Blake Broadhurst
R:	Luke Newick	Mark Haynes	Allistair Pickett
I:	Daniel Chick	Shaun Hildebrandt	Daniel Rich
I:	Marc Webb		
Coach:	Scott Watters		

=== Swan Districts ===
FB:	Paul Richardson	David McInley	Wayde Twomey
HB:	Clancee Pearce	Tim Gepper	Garth Taylor
C:	Michael McInley	Josh Roberts	Brett Wolfenden
HF:	Brett Robinson	Josh Pullman	Tony Notte
FF:	Chris Yarran	Nic Naitanui	Clayton Hinkley
R:	Llane Spaanderman	Ryan Davis	Chris Smith
I:	Jeff Garlett	Michael Johnson	Shane Beros
I:	Todd Banfield		
Coach:	Brian Dawson		

== Match Summary ==
Swans started the game in superb style, as they had the run of the game early, starting with West Coast-listed player Tony Notte kicking the first goal in the opening minute of the game. The underdogs continued to use the ball cleverly and take their chances throughout the opening quarter to open up a somewhat surprising sixteen point lead at quarter time.

In the second term the contest was much more tight and the Lions ferocity was beginning to take its toll on Swans. At half time Subiaco held a slender four point lead.

As the game progressed Swans began to break down across half forward and couldn't find their way to goal enough times to counteract a potent Lions forward set up where WAFL leading goalkicker Brad Smith kicked six goals, Mapleston four and Phil Read and Shaun Hildebrandt three each.

Subiaco then went on in almost 'cruise control' to claim the Premiership.

2008 WAFL Grand Final
Sunday, 20 September	Subiaco	def.	Swan Districts	Subiaco Oval (crowd: 23,199)
3.5 (23); 9.9 (63); 15.13 (103); 22.16 (148)	Q1; Q2; Q3; Final	6.3 (39); 9.5 (59); 10.6 (66); 14.7 (91)	Umpires: Gavin Statham, Start Parry, Dean Margetts; Simpson Medal: Chris Hall (Subiaco); Television broadcast: ABC TV
Brad Smith 6 Mapleston 4 Read 3 Cossom, Chris Hall, Hildebrandt 2 Schofield, Cockie, Hayes 1	Goals	2 Notte, Roberts; 1 Taylor, Michael McInlay, Garlett, Davis, Geappen, Yarran, Pullman, Naitanui, Wolfenden, Banfield
Brad Smith, Mapleston, Read, Hall, Broughton, Schofield, Hildebrandt, Hayes	Best	Roberts, Spaanderman, Wolfenden, Johnson, Notte, Hinkley
Read for charging Josh Roberts	Reports
