= 1925 WAFL season =

Australian rules football season

- Teams: 6
- Premiers: East Fremantle; 12th premiership
- Minor premiers: Subiaco; 3rd minor premiership
- Sandover Medallist: George Owens (East Perth)
- Bernie Naylor Medallist: Ted Flemming (West Perth)
- Matches played: 49

The 1925 WAFL season was the 41st season of the West Australian Football League. It was notable as the season where a fully-fledged system of district football was firmly in place after two seasons of planning, with Perth divided into eight zones, one of which was allocated to Claremont in preparation for their entry to senior WAFL ranks for 1926 and another covered the Midland area later to be allocated to Swan Districts. Along with this, the WAFL introduced a reserves competition for players not good enough for their club's league team.

The season saw East Fremantle gain revenge for the previous season's Grand Final loss against a Subiaco team often thought to be the most talented that club had fielded so far in its history with three exceptional finals performances.

A notable incident during the season was a postponement of the Round 12 match between East Perth and West Perth because the Cardinals failed to return on time from a tour of Tasmania, due to being entertained by Senator Pearce in Melbourne the day the "Kalgoorlie Express" was due to leave from Melbourne.

== Home-and-away season ==
=== Round 1 ===
	Round 1
Saturday, 2 May (3:00 pm)	Perth 10.20 (80)	def.	East Perth 10.10 (70)	WACA
Saturday, 2 May (3:00 pm)	Subiaco 12.13 (85)	def.	West Perth 7.9 (51)	Subiaco Oval
Saturday, 2 May (3:00 pm)	South Fremantle 7.7 (49)	def. by	East Fremantle 14.9 (93)	Fremantle Oval
The new rule (as in the VFL) of awarding a free kick against a player who puts the ball out of bounds is regarded as a great success: it was estimated that in one game there were only seventeen stoppages.

=== Round 2 ===
	Round 2
Saturday, 9 May (3:00 pm)	Perth 21.7 (133)	def.	South Fremantle 11.8 (74)	WACA
Saturday, 9 May (3:00 pm)	East Perth 9.10 (64)	def.	West Perth 8.6 (54)	Perth Oval
Saturday, 9 May (3:00 pm)	Subiaco 11.7 (73)	def.	East Fremantle 9.6 (60)	Subiaco Oval
Perth’s score was the first of twenty goals in the WAFL since 12 July 1919, when East Fremantle kicked 21.15 (141) against West Perth.

=== Round 3 ===
	Round 3
Saturday, 16 May (3:00 pm)	West Perth 7.13 (55)	def. by	East Fremantle 12.5 (77)	Leederville Oval
Saturday, 16 May (3:00 pm)	Perth 4.14 (38)	def. by	Subiaco 8.15 (63)	WACA
Saturday, 16 May (3:00 pm)	South Fremantle 7.12 (54)	def. by	East Perth 13.9 (87)	Fremantle Oval

=== Round 4 ===
	Round 4
Saturday, 23 May (3:00 pm)	East Perth 10.12 (72)	def. by	Subiaco 16.10 (106)	Perth Oval
Saturday, 23 May (3:00 pm)	East Fremantle 11.15 (81)	def.	Perth 8.12 (60)	Fremantle Oval
Saturday, 23 May (3:00 pm)	West Perth 14.19 (103)	def.	South Fremantle 7.8 (50)	Leederville Oval
Subiaco, with Ahearn kicking eight goals in the absence of top goal-sneak Rodriguez, move to a clear top. In the process the Maroons end the most recent run of 100 games without reaching 100 points.

=== Round 5 (Foundation Day) ===
	Round 5
Saturday, 30 May (3:00 pm)	South Fremantle 9.10 (64)	drew with	Subiaco 9.10 (64)	Fremantle Oval
Saturday, 30 May (3:00 pm)	Perth 8.11 (59)	def. by	West Perth 11.17 (83)	WACA
Monday, 1 June (3:00 pm)	East Perth 11.11 (77)	def.	East Fremantle 8.13 (61)	Subiaco Oval
This is the most recent drawn game between Subiaco and South Fremantle.

=== Round 6 (King’s Birthday) ===
	Round 6
Saturday, 6 June (3:00 pm)	East Fremantle 11.12 (78)	def.	South Fremantle 7.10 (52)	Fremantle Oval
Saturday, 6 June (3:00 pm)	East Perth 11.11 (77)	def.	Perth 8.15 (63)	Perth Oval
Monday, 8 June (3:00 pm)	West Perth 12.11 (83)	def.	Subiaco 12.10 (82)	Leederville Oval
This was the second last time the WA(N)FL played matches on the King’s Birthday public holiday, (Note: The only subsequent King's Birthday games in the WA(N)FL occurred in 1946, the season after federal government bans on weekday sport during the Pacific War were lifted.) though the VFL/AFL and SANFL have done so ever since.; In a match noted for its brilliant high marking, Subiaco lose their unbeaten record as they fail to get a kick away when the bell sounds.

=== Round 7 ===
	Round 7
Saturday, 13 June (3:00 pm)	Perth 16.5 (101)	def.	South Fremantle 7.10 (52)	WACA
Saturday, 13 June (3:00 pm)	East Fremantle 7.17 (59)	def.	Subiaco 7.8 (50)	Fremantle Oval
Saturday, 13 June (3:00 pm)	West Perth 14.15 (99)	def.	East Perth 7.6 (48)	Leederville Oval
1924 wooden spooners West Perth, in rainy conditions, win their fourth straight game by thrashing a depleted Royal team with 8.9 (57) to 2.3 (15) after half-time.

=== Interstate match ===
Interstate match
Saturday, 20 June (3:00 pm)	Western Australia	def. by	South Australia	Subiaco Oval
2.3 (15); 3.5 (23); 6.9 (45); 7.12 (54)	Q1; Q2; Q3; Final	2.2 (14); 6.6 (42); 7.7 (49); 8.9 (57)	Umpires: Frank O‘Connor
Johnny Campbell 3, Bonny Campbell 2, Owens, Parks	Goals	Bent 2, McGregor 2, Dayman 2, Ryan, Potts
Johnny Campbell, Sherlock, Leonard, Craig, Brophy, Jarvis, Green	Best	Golding (best on ground), Lid, Dayman, Ryan, Moriarty, McGregor, Whitehead
South Australia hold off the locals in a thrilling match, in which a gate of £997 (Note: Until 1947, WA(N)FL attendances were almost never quantified except for finals matches, and before 1920 they were not quantified even then – gates were used as an indication of the number watching.) showed the popularity of football.

=== Round 8 ===
	Round 8
Saturday, 27 June (3:00 pm)	East Perth 8.17 (65)	def. by	South Fremantle 10.7 (67)	Perth Oval
Saturday, 27 June (3:00 pm)	Subiaco 6.8 (44)	def.	Perth 4.11 (35)	Subiaco Oval
Saturday, 27 June (3:00 pm)	East Fremantle 12.13 (85)	def.	West Perth 7.11 (53)	Fremantle Oval
East Fremantle end the Cardinals’ run on another wet Saturday despite Flemming kicking six of their seven goals.; South Fremantle win their first game against the depleted Royals, handicapped by injuries to captain Hebbard, Walsh, O‘Meara and Fletcher.

=== Round 9 ===
	Round 9
Saturday, 4 July (3:00 pm)	South Fremantle 7.7 (49)	def. by	West Perth 8.4 (52)	Fremantle Oval
Saturday, 4 July (3:00 pm)	Perth 8.10 (58)	def. by	East Fremantle 12.17 (89)	WACA
Saturday, 4 July (3:00 pm)	Subiaco 6.12 (48)	def. by	East Perth 8.13 (61)	Subiaco Oval
In a thrilling last stanza of a scrappy game, South Fremantle fail to obtain the decisive goal and kick the only 0.3 (3) of the whole last quarter.

=== Round 10 ===
	Round 10
Saturday, 11 July (3:00 pm)	West Perth 9.8 (62)	def. by	Perth 12.13 (85)	Leederville Oval
Saturday, 11 July (3:00 pm)	East Fremantle 13.13 (91)	def.	East Perth 8.4 (52)	Fremantle Oval
Saturday, 11 July (3:00 pm)	Subiaco 12.13 (85)	def.	South Fremantle 6.5 (41)	Subiaco Oval

=== Round 11 ===
	Round 11
Saturday, 18 July (3:00 pm)	Subiaco 11.8 (74)	def.	West Perth 9.13 (67)	Subiaco Oval
Saturday, 18 July (3:00 pm)	South Fremantle 8.8 (56)	def.	East Fremantle 4.13 (37)	Fremantle Oval
Saturday, 18 July (3:00 pm)	East Perth 14.12 (96)	def.	Perth 3.12 (30)	Perth Oval
During the two weekends following this round, Western Australia were thrashed at the MCG by 8.10 (58) to 22.11 (143) and then at the Adelaide Oval on 1 August by 7.8 (50) to 12.22 (94).; West Perth went on a tour of Tasmania at this time and played two games against representative teams there, beating Northern Tasmania 10.7 (67) to 7.10 (52) on 25 July and losing 8.5 (53) to 8.12 (60) against Southern Tasmania on 1 August.

=== Round 12 ===
	Round 12
Saturday, 8 August (3:00 pm)	Subiaco 10.14 (74)	def.	East Fremantle 11.7 (73)	Subiaco Oval
Saturday, 8 August (3:00 pm)	South Fremantle 8.7 (55)	def. by	Perth 9.11 (65)	Fremantle Oval
Saturday, 15 August (3:00 pm)	East Perth 4.17 (41)	def. by	West Perth 12.16 (88)	Perth Oval
The Perth Oval match was postponed because West Perth were delayed in their return from Tasmania.; The Cardinals, despite having only seventeen players, record a hollow victory over East Perth.

=== Round 13 ===
	Round 13
Saturday, 22 August (3:00 pm)	West Perth 10.18 (78)	def.	East Fremantle 3.7 (25)	Leederville Oval
Saturday, 22 August (3:00 pm)	Perth 7.10 (52)	def. by	Subiaco 13.9 (87)	WACA
Saturday, 22 August (3:00 pm)	South Fremantle 6.10 (46)	def. by	East Perth 15.12 (102)	Fremantle Oval

=== Round 14 ===
	Round 14
Saturday, 29 August (3:00 pm)	East Fremantle 15.10 (100)	def.	Perth 11.10 (76)	Fremantle Oval
Saturday, 29 August (3:00 pm)	West Perth 13.7 (85)	def.	South Fremantle 7.9 (51)	Leederville Oval
Saturday, 29 August (3:00 pm)	East Perth 4.9 (33)	def. by	Subiaco 6.8 (44)	Perth Oval
Subiaco seal the minor premiership as a result of East Perth’s shocking forward work in perfect conditions.

=== Round 15 ===
	Round 15
Saturday, 5 September (3:00 pm)	East Perth 9.12 (66)	def.	East Fremantle 7.3 (45)	Perth Oval
Saturday, 5 September (3:00 pm)	South Fremantle 13.7 (85)	def.	Subiaco 11.9 (75)	Fremantle Oval
Saturday, 5 September (3:00 pm)	Perth 8.10 (58)	def. by	West Perth 7.17 (59)	WACA
A dubious goal by Beaumont when Sharples almost certainly marked inside the field of play gives West Perth a narrow win.

== Ladder ==
1925 WAFL ladder
Pos	Team	Pld	W	L	D	PF	PA	PP	Pts
1	Subiaco	15	10	4	1	1054	874	120.6	42
2	West Perth	15	9	6	0	1072	933	114.9	36
3	East Fremantle (P)	15	9	6	0	1054	929	113.5	36
4	East Perth	15	8	7	0	1011	976	103.6	32
5	Perth	15	5	10	0	993	1092	90.9	20
6	South Fremantle	15	3	11	1	845	1225	69.0	14

Rules for classification: 1) points; 2) percentage; 3) number of points for.
(P) Premiers

== Finals ==
=== First semi-final ===
	First semi-final
Saturday, 12 September (3:00 pm)	West Perth 2.9 (21)	def. by	East Fremantle 6.22 (58)	Subiaco Oval (crowd: 9,483)
East Fremantle’s superior ground play in cold, wet and windy weather ensures them a clear win over the high-flying style of the Cardinals.; West Perth never again scored only two goals in a match or a lower total score until 2014.

=== Second semi-final ===
	Second semi-final
Saturday, 19 September (3:00 pm)	Subiaco 13.15 (93)	def. by	East Perth 15.12 (102)	WACA (crowd: 9,045)
An eight-goal second quarter ensures East Perth upset the minor premiers, in the process avenging their loss in the corresponding match from 1924.

=== Final ===
	Preliminary final
Saturday, 26 September (3:00 pm)	East Fremantle 12.10 (82)	def.	East Perth 5.7 (37)	Subiaco Oval (crowd: 12,077)
After losing star goalkicker Bonny Campbell with a broken bone in his ankle the Royals are crushed by a rugged East Fremantle outfit.

=== Grand Final ===
1925 WAFL Grand Final
Saturday, 3 October (3:00 pm)	Subiaco	def. by	East Fremantle	Perth Oval (crowd: 15,112)
0.1 (1); 1.3 (9); 3.5 (23); 6.7 (43)	Q1; Q2; Q3; Final	5.4 (34); 8.4 (52); 8.8 (56); 10.10 (70)	Umpires: Frank O‘Connor
Rodriguez 3, Grigg 2, Ahearn	Goals	Gibson 2, Truscott 2, Gallagher 2, Woods, Jarvis, Dolan, Cinoris
Brophy (best on ground), Leonard, Scaddan, Wieland, Grigg, Rodriguez	Best	Dolan, Buchanan, Coffey, Brown, Mudie, Jones, Jarvis
Outridge (ankle)	Injuries
East Fremantle continue their form of the previous two finals to have the premiership sealed by half-time, aided by a wind that lost its force during the second quarter.
