= Tom Outridge =

Tom Outridge may refer to:

- Tom Outridge Sr. (1898–1973), Australian rules football player and administrator
- Tom Outridge Jr. (1927–2003), his son, Australian cricketer
