= 1924 WAFL season =

40th season of the West Australian Football League

- Teams: 6
- Premiers: Subiaco; 4th premiership
- Minor premiers: East Fremantle; 14th minor premiership
- Sandover Medallist: Jim Gosnell (West Perth)
- Bernie Naylor Medallist: Bonny Campbell (East Perth)
- Matches played: 49

The 1924 WAFL season was the 40th season of the West Australian Football League. Although East Perth and East Fremantle completely dominated the season until after the Carnival, each having lost only one match of the first eleven, neither was to win the premiership and the Royals’ record sequence of five consecutive premierships came to an end in the semi-final.

Subiaco, who along with Perth had been in the doldrums during the preceding seasons, finally developed the teamwork to match the individual talents of players like Outridge, skipper "Snowy" Hamilton and young rover Johnny Leonard – consequently carrying all before them during the finals after a mediocre home-and-away season. Despite maintaining prominence for another decade, the Maroons would then become a perennial cellar-dweller for three decades and failed to win another premiership until 1973 – the longest premiership drought in WA(N)FL history. Despite Gosnell being the second of their famous half-back line to win the Sandover Medal, West Perth fell to wooden spooners owing to the suspension of key forward Fred Wimbridge for most of the season.

Following controversy over his clearance from South Fremantle that caused him to sit out the 1923 season, East Perth's "Bonny" Campbell was to break Allan Evans’ record from 1921 for the most goals scored during a WAFL season with 67.

Including the Hobart Carnival, where he kicked 51 goals – including an amazing 23 against Queensland – Campbell kicked 118 goals for the entire year, with his 100-goal season coming five years before Gordon Coventry and six years before Ken Farmer.

== Home-and-away season ==
=== Round 1 ===
	Round 1
Saturday, 3 May (3:00 pm)	West Perth 6.10 (46)	def. by	Subiaco 8.8 (56)	Leederville Oval
Saturday, 3 May (3:00 pm)	East Fremantle 15.12 (102)	def.	South Fremantle 5.9 (39)	Fremantle Oval
Saturday, 3 May (3:00 pm)	East Perth 10.9 (69)	def.	Perth 6.13 (49)	Perth Oval
East Perth unfurl their pennant with eight goals in the second quarter, and despite scoring only 0.5 (5) after half-time Perth cannot catch them.

=== Round 2 ===
	Round 2
Saturday, 10 May (3:00 pm)	Perth 7.11 (53)	def. by	East Fremantle 10.17 (77)	WACA
Saturday, 10 May (3:00 pm)	South Fremantle 9.12 (66)	def.	West Perth 7.10 (52)	Fremantle Oval
Saturday, 10 May (3:00 pm)	Subiaco 11.13 (79)	def. by	East Perth 13.6 (84)	Subiaco Oval

=== Round 3 ===
	Round 3
Saturday, 17 May (3:00 pm)	West Perth 12.11 (83)	def. by	Perth 16.5 (101)	Leederville Oval
Saturday, 17 May (3:00 pm)	South Fremantle 10.9 (69)	drew with	Subiaco 9.15 (69)	Fremantle Oval
Saturday, 17 May (3:00 pm)	East Fremantle 12.9 (81)	def.	East Perth 9.12 (66)	Perth Oval
With Evans kicking eight goals, Perth win its first match and only its fifth since the end of 1921.

=== Round 4 ===
	Round 4
Saturday, 24 May (3:00 pm)	Subiaco 8.11 (59)	def.	Perth 6.7 (43)	Subiaco Oval
Saturday, 24 May (3:00 pm)	East Fremantle 13.14 (92)	def.	West Perth 8.2 (50)	Fremantle Oval
Saturday, 24 May (3:00 pm)	East Perth 16.12 (108)	def.	South Fremantle 3.6 (24)	Perth Oval
"Bonny" Campbell becomes the first East Perth player to kick double figures in a match as the Royals demolish South Fremantle for the biggest win the WAFL since 1919.

=== Round 5 (Foundation Day) ===
	Round 5
Saturday, 31 May (3:00 pm)	Perth 6.12 (48)	def. by	South Fremantle 7.8 (50)	WACA
Saturday, 31 May (3:00 pm)	East Fremantle 11.8 (74)	def.	Subiaco 9.11 (65)	Fremantle Oval
Monday, 2 June (3:00 pm)	West Perth 5.13 (43)	def. by	East Perth 10.11 (71)	Leederville Oval

=== Round 6 ===
	Round 6
Saturday, 7 June (3:00 pm)	Perth 6.3 (39)	def. by	East Perth 9.11 (65)	WACA
Saturday, 7 June (3:00 pm)	Subiaco 10.8 (68)	def.	West Perth 9.9 (63)	Subiaco Oval
Saturday, 7 June (3:00 pm)	East Fremantle 11.13 (79)	def.	South Fremantle 5.12 (42)	Fremantle Oval
Johnny Leonard’s superb roving in a high-standard match in heavy rain ensures West Perth remain winless and keeps the Maroons clear in third position.

=== Round 7 ===
	Round 7
Saturday, 14 June (3:00 pm)	East Fremantle 13.16 (94)	def.	Perth 8.12 (60)	Fremantle Oval
Saturday, 14 June (3:00 pm)	East Perth 17.9 (111)	def.	Subiaco 7.15 (57)	Perth Oval
Saturday, 14 June (3:00 pm)	West Perth 11.18 (84)	def.	South Fremantle 5.8 (38)	Leederville Oval
With Campbell adding another six goals as the rain of previous weeks cleared, East Perth and East Fremantle move ten points clear just before the halfway mark of the season.

=== Round 8 ===
	Round 8
Saturday, 21 June (3:00 pm)	Perth 9.8 (62)	def. by	West Perth 9.10 (64)	WACA
Saturday, 21 June (3:00 pm)	East Fremantle 8.16 (64)	def. by	East Perth 11.12 (78)	Fremantle Oval
Saturday, 21 June (3:00 pm)	Subiaco 11.7 (73)	def.	South Fremantle 8.11 (59)	Subiaco Oval
West Perth move a game clear of Perth at the bottom in a game marred by numerous all-in-brawls.; East Perth end East Fremantle’s undefeated run with a strong second-quarter burst reminiscent of their opening round match with Perth.

=== Round 9 ===
	Round 9
Saturday, 28 June (3:00 pm)	West Perth 8.10 (58)	def. by	East Fremantle 14.11 (95)	Leederville Oval
Saturday, 28 June (3:00 pm)	Perth 7.11 (53)	def. by	Subiaco 12.14 (86)	WACA
Saturday, 28 June (3:00 pm)	South Fremantle 9.8 (62)	def. by	East Perth 14.11 (95)	Fremantle Oval

=== Round 10 ===
	Round 10
Saturday, 5 July (3:00 pm)	Subiaco 12.9 (81)	def. by	East Fremantle 15.12 (102)	Subiaco Oval
Saturday, 5 July (3:00 pm)	East Perth 10.16 (76)	def.	West Perth 10.6 (66)	Perth Oval
Saturday, 5 July (3:00 pm)	South Fremantle 12.11 (83)	def.	Perth 8.11 (59)	Fremantle Oval
In an exceptional standard preview of the grand final, East Fremantle kick three goals that belie the closeness of the match all afternoon.

=== Round 11 ===
	Round 11
Saturday, 12 July (3:00 pm)	West Perth 11.18 (84)	def.	Subiaco 6.9 (45)	Leederville Oval
Saturday, 12 July (3:00 pm)	East Fremantle 10.14 (74)	def.	South Fremantle 9.9 (63)	Fremantle Oval
Saturday, 12 July (3:00 pm)	East Perth 9.11 (65)	def.	Perth 7.9 (51)	Perth Oval
Despite asking for the return of three irregular membership tickets, West Perth win easily to move within half a win of the top four.

=== Round 12 ===
	Round 12
Saturday, 19 July (3:00 pm)	Subiaco 11.7 (73)	def.	East Perth 8.7 (55)	Subiaco Oval
Saturday, 19 July (3:00 pm)	Perth 8.5 (53)	def. by	East Fremantle 8.11 (59)	WACA
Saturday, 19 July (3:00 pm)	South Fremantle 10.9 (69)	def.	West Perth 9.5 (59)	Fremantle Oval
Subiaco record a surprise victory over East Perth with a strong first half to give the first suggestion the premiership will not be a two-horse race as had appeared previously.; Minus eventual Sandover winner Jim Gosnell (illness), West Perth in a high-standard match fail to take fourth position and do not obtain another opportunity.

=== Round 13 ===
	Round 13
Saturday, 26 July (3:00 pm)	East Fremantle 10.7 (67)	def.	East Perth 7.12 (54)	Subiaco Oval
Saturday, 26 July (3:00 pm)	West Perth 6.11 (47)	def. by	Perth 10.11 (71)	Leederville Oval
Saturday, 26 July (3:00 pm)	South Fremantle 9.12 (66)	def.	Subiaco 5.13 (43)	Fremantle Oval
This week’s results, in the last round before the Hobart Carnival, effectively seal both the finalists and the minor premiership, leaving East Fremantle two games clear of East Perth on top and South Fremantle ten points clear of West Perth for fourth.

=== Round 14 ===
	Round 14
Saturday, 30 August (3:00 pm)	Subiaco 6.14 (50)	def. by	Perth 12.9 (81)	Subiaco Oval
Saturday, 30 August (3:00 pm)	East Perth 15.15 (105)	def.	South Fremantle 8.12 (60)	Perth Oval
Saturday, 30 August (3:00 pm)	East Fremantle 12.4 (76)	def.	West Perth 7.9 (51)	Fremantle Oval
Dash and pace – which some thought inherited from a tour of the Eastern States early in August – allow the Redlegs to move from the bottom and avoid a fourth consecutive wooden spoon.

=== Round 15 ===
	Round 15
Saturday, 6 September (3:00 pm)	West Perth 10.14 (74)	def. by	East Perth 17.9 (111)	Leederville Oval
Saturday, 6 September (3:00 pm)	Perth 8.13 (61)	def.	South Fremantle 6.11 (47)	WACA
Saturday, 6 September (3:00 pm)	East Fremantle 8.11 (59)	def. by	Subiaco 11.15 (81)	Fremantle Oval
Subiaco’s surprise victory, with the promising Greg Hickey fully recovered from a mid-season injury, paves the way for their successes in the subsequent finals.

== Ladder ==
1924 ladder
Pos	Team	Pld	W	L	D	PF	PA	PP	Pts
1	East Fremantle	15	13	2	0	1195	894	133.7	52
2	East Perth	15	12	3	0	1213	889	136.4	48
3	Subiaco (P)	15	7	7	1	985	1049	93.9	30
4	South Fremantle	15	5	9	1	838	1112	75.4	22
5	Perth	15	4	11	0	885	999	88.6	16
6	West Perth	15	3	12	0	924	1097	84.2	12

Source: WAFL Footy Facts
Rules for classification: 1) points; 2) percentage; 3) number of points for.
(P) Premiers

== Final ==
=== First semi-final ===
	First semi-final
Saturday, 13 September (3:00 pm)	East Fremantle 12.12 (84)	def.	South Fremantle 7.5 (47)	Fremantle Oval (crowd: 4,009)
Minor premiers East Fremantle have no difficulty winning against a South team that had had the poorest record for fourth place in WAFA/WAFL history.

=== Second semi-final ===
	Second semi-final
Saturday, 20 September (3:00 pm)	East Perth 7.11 (53)	def. by	Subiaco 8.13 (61)	WACA (crowd: 8,260)
Subiaco end East Perth’s run of five consecutive premierships with a hard-fought victory in windy conditions, with Outridge and Leonard outstanding.

=== Final ===
	Final
Saturday, 27 September (3:00 pm)	East Fremantle 3.9 (27)	def. by	Subiaco 11.7 (73)	Perth Oval (crowd: 13,158)
Subiaco record an unexpectedly one-sided victory over Old Easts in perfect conditions, with their defence so strong East Fremantle kick only 1.2 (8) in the second half.

=== Grand Final ===
1924 WAFL Grand Final
Saturday, 4 October (3:00 pm)	East Fremantle	def. by	Subiaco	Perth Oval (crowd: 10,519)
0.1 (1); 0.4 (4); 3.5 (23); 3.6 (24)	Q1; Q2; Q3; Final	1.2 (8); 4.3 (27); 5.3 (33); 7.9 (51)	Umpires: "Joe" Brack
Coffey 2, Richards	Goals	Rodriguez 4, Grigg 2, Hickey
Dolan, Jarvis, Wicks, Truscott, Mudie, Dunne	Best	Grigg (best on ground), Green, Hodge, Outridge, Leonard, Hamilton, Rodriguez
A brilliant first quarter into a very strong wind sets up an unexpected premiership victory for the Maroons – to remain their last for forty-nine seasons.
