= Subiaco Football Club =

Australian rules football club in WAFL

Names
- Full name: Subiaco Football Club
- Nickname: Lions

2023 season
- Home-and-away season: 2nd

Club details
- Founded: 1896; 130 years ago
- Colours: Maroon Gold
- Competition: West Australian Football League (men); WAFL Women's (women)
- Chairperson: Russell Smith
- Coach: Jarrad Schofield
- Captain(s): Greg Clark & Tess Lyons
- Premierships: 16 (1912, 1913, 1915, 1924, 1973, 1986, 1988, 2004, 2006, 2007, 2008, 2014, 2015, 2018, 2019, 2021)
- Ground: Sullivan Logistics Stadium (capacity: 18,000)

Uniforms
Home	Away

Other information
- Official website: sfclions.com.au

The Subiaco Football Club, nicknamed the Lions and known before 1973 as the Maroons, is an Australian rules football club in the West Australian Football League (WAFL) and WAFL Women's (WAFLW). It was founded in 1896, and admitted to the WAFL in 1901, along with North Fremantle. The club is currently based at Sullivan Logistics Stadium having previously played at Subiaco Oval.

== History ==
Subiaco was incorporated in 1896, establishing its base at a small playing arena within the environs of the Shenton Park Lake. During the club's embryonic period it played in the "First Rate Juniors" competition from 1896 to 1900 and enjoyed premiership success. As a result, along with fellow First Rate Junior powerhouse North Fremantle the Subiaco Football Club joined the then West Australian Football Association competition (known today as the West Australian Football League – WAFL) in 1901. However, it struggled so much that there were long debates as to whether it should continue after it won only eleven games in its first seven seasons but with the construction of Subiaco Oval on what was formerly called the "sand patch", the club's performances improved: very slowly at first, but very rapidly after the acquisition of two key forwards in Phil Matson and Herbert Limb for the 1912 season. That year Subiaco rose from second last to their first ever premiership despite a thrashing from East Fremantle in the final, and they again won premierships against Perth in 1913 and 1915 before loss of players to World War I gave them the rare ignominy of plummeting from premiers to the wooden spoon in 1916.

During the inter-war period Subiaco were mainly a middle-of-the-road outfit, though they did win a premiership from third in 1924 and played in three grand finals for the rest of that decade, only to lose each time to East Fremantle or East Perth. They were noted for a large number of outstanding players during this period, including ruckman Tom Outridge and rover Johnny Leonard, but as these players declined Subiaco began a period of struggle that would rival their experiences in the 1900s (and from 1975 to 1983).

They plummeted to their first wooden spoon since 1916 in 1937 and made an extremely ambitious recruiting coup by providing local employment for three Victorian champions in Haydn Bunton, Keith Shea and Les Hardiman. Although Bunton lived up to his Fitzroy reputation and at times did work far beyond that expected of a rover, Shea and Hardiman did not, and Subiaco in the four seasons from 1938 to 1941 won only 23 and drew one of eighty games, finishing seventh twice and sixth twice in an eight-team competition.

After the WANFL operated on an under-age format for three seasons from 1942 to 1944, Subiaco rose to fifth in 1945 and third in 1946, but this proved a false honeymoon. Sorely lacking in high quality players, Subiaco between 1947 and 1956 won only thirty-eight of 198 games, and simply failed to recruit players of the quality that the two Fremantle sides, Perth and West Perth did. It was engaged in a consistent battle with Swan Districts for the wooden spoon, and never finished higher than seventh in an eight-team competition.

Late in the 1950s, Subiaco emerged from the doldrums in spectacular fashion when in its first final for thirteen years it kicked a remarkable 16.8 (104) in the third quarter against Perth - easily a record quarter score for a senior Australian rules final. They then beat East Fremantle to reach their first grand final since 1935, but were beaten by East Perth and in the following years Subiaco again struggled, winning only 69 and drawing three of 168 home-and-away games between 1960 and 1967 and never seeming to have good direction in their management. 1968, however, saw the club achieve stability through the recruitment of Haydn Bunton junior as coach and a record season from Austin Robertson at full forward, who kicked 157 goals and in one match against East Fremantle fifteen of nineteen (along with eleven behinds!). The club finished fourth every year from 1968 to 1970, but declined somewhat in 1971 and 1972. However, under new captain-coach Ross Smith and with the emergence of star players like Mike Fitzpatrick, Subiaco emerged for the first time since the Matson era as firm favourites for the flag during 1973 and duly beat West Perth.

However, with the departure of Fitzpatrick and Peter Featherby to the VFL, Subiaco returned to the dark days of the late 1940s and early 1950s. In 1974 they reached the First Semi-Final only to lose to Swan Districts, but would not participate in the finals for a decade afterwards and finished absolutely last in 1976, 1979, 1980 and 1982. In the process they won just 44 of 189 games, and in 1982 looked like having a winless season before beating East Fremantle in the seventeenth round. However, during this period every one of the other seven WAFL clubs won at least one premiership. Their only genuinely class player of this era, Gary Buckenara, defected to Hawthorn after three years with the Lions. Worse still, unlike that earlier bleak era, Subiaco were hit by severe financial problems and only community involvement during the early 1980s managed to save the club from extinction.

The return of Haydn Bunton junior as coach after a long stint with South Adelaide was viewed by most Subiaco fans as the return of a master, and it is remarkable how he rose a nearly defunct club to a major force in the WAFL. Subiaco moved from four wins to nine in 1984 (along with a reserves premiership) and rose to second behind East Fremantle in 1985. Although it was their first finals appearance since 1974, Subiaco did not disappoint but ultimately failed by five points. However, 1986 saw them even better, beating VFL club St Kilda in the Foster's Cup and losing only four games all year - their second-best home-and-away return behind 1912 - before recovering from a thrashing from East Fremantle to demolish that team in the Grand Final by sixty-nine points.

Bunton junior's aim of a Subiaco dynasty was ended by the formation of the West Coast Eagles that summer, which quickly drained the WAFL of all its best talent. Nonetheless, he coached the Lions to another premiership in 1988, and although they did decline to only six wins in 1989 and 1990, Subiaco maintained a respectable position in the weakened WAFL over the next decade, before becoming the richest and most powerful club therein during the 2000s under the coaching of Peter German and Scott Watters with premierships in 2004, 2006, 2007 and 2008 - in the last of which they were amazingly unlucky not to be only the second undefeated team in open-age WAFL history suffering only a one-point loss to Swan Districts.

Subiaco would endure a lull after their historic three-peat between 2006 and 2008 before returning to the WAFL Grand Final against Claremont in 2011 under the guidance of ex-West Coast Eagle Chris Waterman. The Lions would be humbled by the Tigers on the day with a 56-point defeat solemnly ending Subiaco's season. The Lions suffered a Grand Final hangover in 2012 free-falling down the table to finish seventh with only seven wins. This resulted in head coach Chris Waterman being replaced by club great Jarrad Schofield who played in two premierships for the Lions on either side of a 206-game AFL career. Schofield worked hard to instil a new system at Subiaco resulting in a low key eighth finish again in 2013 with only six wins; but it would set the building blocks for a miraculous face lift in 2014.

After recruiting heavily over the off-season and relying on a strong base of home-grown talent the Lions turned their fortunes around to finish second in 2014 and contend for their seventh grand final in eleven seasons. Subiaco lost their first semi-final to the heavily favoured Royals before pulling off a nail-biting five-point win over the East Fremantle Sharks in an elimination final to secure the club's 24th Grand Final appearance. On a wet and blustery day the Lions proved too determined for the West Coast Eagles affiliated Royals to record a famous 16-point Grand Final victory and the club's twelfth historically. Jason Bristow was awarded best on ground with 23 disposals and a goal whilst Kyal Horsley captained Subiaco to his second Grand Final. Subiaco veteran Darren Rumble became the club's most successful player historically with his fifth premiership for the club.

Less than 24 hours after Subiaco secured their club's twelfth premiership they also had the club's second Brownlow Medallist with Matthew Priddis winning the AFL's best and fairest after an outstanding season with the West Coast Eagles. Priddis played 63 games for the Lions including two WAFL premierships and a Sandover medal before being drafted to the Eagles in 2006.

Subiaco entered the 2015 season in their third season under Jarrad Schofield and had to replace a host of retiring premiership stars. Jason Bristow, Shaun Hildebrandt, Daniel Leishman, Andrew Mcdougall and Robert Forrest all retired after the 2014 premiership. Subiaco used the open market to bring in a host of talent with Victorians Leigh Kitchin and Brett Robinson joining the club as well as Scott Hancock (East Fremantle), Sam Menegola (Ex-Fremantle) and Jordan Lockyer (Ex-Sydney). Talented youngster Michael Wood also re-joined the Lions after a year on Fremantle's list.

The influx of players had a big impact on the 2015 season with the six recruits combining for 117 games and big contributions in the club's 13th flag. The Lions were the most dominant season over the 2015 WAFL season finishing four games on top with a record of 17–3. Subiaco crushed rivals West Perth by 55 points in the second semi at Medibank Stadium to book their place in the Grand Final.

Heading into their seventh Grand Final in ten years the Lions stood as comprehensive favourites. West Perth made it through after beating Fremantle aligned Peel Thunder and West Coast aligned East Perth but were a class below in WAFL Grand Final 131. The Lions outplayed the Falcons in every term to run out 66-point winners at Domain Stadium to secure the club's 13th premiership. Matt Boland claimed the Simpson Medal for best player on ground with seven goals in a dazzling display.

Shane Yarran became the first player of indigenous heritage to win the leading goal-kicker award for Subi in 2015 with 46 on the season. The mercurial forward also claimed the REIWA Goal of the Year.

In 2016 the Lions looked to achieve the second three-peat in the club's long history. Key premiership players Shane Yarran & Sam Menegola departed to the AFL and 2016 proved to be the biggest challenge for Jarrad Schofield and his men. Despite finishing first over the home and away season and convincingly winning their semi-final, the Lions fell agonisingly short of the Peel Thunder squad. The Fremantle Football Club aligned club fielded 17 Dockers including past hero Shane Yarran. Subiaco lost by 23 points but earned the admiration of the WAFL community against an incredibly talented Peel side.

The 2018 season marked one of the most dominant campaigns in the history of the Subiaco Football Club and the West Australian Football League (WAFL). During the year, Subiaco achieved the unprecedented feat of winning premierships in all three senior grades — League, Reserves and Colts — the first time this had been accomplished by a WAFL club.

The League side completed the season undefeated, culminating in a comprehensive victory in the 2018 WAFL Grand Final. The achievement positioned Subiaco among the most dominant teams in the competition’s history and underscored the club’s strength across its entire football program, from junior development through to senior level.

The season was led by senior coach Jarrad Schofield, whose tenure was characterised by sustained on-field success, disciplined structures and strong player development. Following the 2018 premiership, Schofield departed Subiaco to pursue opportunities in the Australian Football League (AFL), later joining the coaching staff at the Port Adelaide Football Club as an assistant coach.

Subiaco’s undefeated League premiership and clean sweep across all grades in 2018 remains a landmark achievement in WAFL history and a defining chapter in the club’s modern era.

In 2019, Beau Wardman replaced Jarrad Schofield as senior coach and Leigh Kitchin took over the reins from Kyal Horsley as club captain. Adam Cockie and Brad Stevenson retired before the start of 2018. Zac Clarke was recruited by Essendon as part of the new AFL pre-season draft. Harry Marsh joined the Lions after being delisted by Sydney Swans. The club recorded an 17–1 season before winning the Grand Final by 96 points over South Fremantle, the biggest Grand Final win in club history. Ben Sokol was named Simpson Medalist. Lachlan Delahunty won the Sandover Medal by one vote from Kyal Horsley.

Subiaco were a foundation member of the WAFL Women's competition in 2019 after absorbing the West Australia Women's Football League (WAWFL) team 'Coastal Titans'.

In 2025, Krstel Petrevski won the clubs fourth Dhara Kerr Medal with 26 points.

In 2025, Jarrad Schofield returned as Senior Coach.

== Club song ==
The club song of the Subiaco Football Club is sung to the tune of "The Battle Hymn of the Republic" written by John Irvin, a supporter of Subiaco, and adopted by the club.

Subiaco players know the meaning of success
Dedication is the way to fight for happiness
We're the mighty, fighting Lions and we'll grind them in the ground
To the premiership, we're bound.

Glory, Glory Subiaco
Glory, Glory Subiaco
Glory, Glory Subiaco
The team is striving on.

Glory, Glory Subiaco
Glory, Glory Subiaco
Glory, Glory Subiaco
The team is striving on.

Subiaco players know the meaning of success
Dedication is the way to fight for happiness
We're the mighty, fighting Lions and we'll grind them in the ground
To the premiership, we're bound.

Glory, Glory Subiaco
Glory, Glory Subiaco
Glory, Glory Subiaco
The team is striving on.

Glory, Glory Subiaco
Glory, Glory Subiaco
Glory, Glory Subiaco
The team is striving on.

The team is striving on.

== Honours ==
=== Club honours ===
Premierships
Competition	Level	Wins	Years won
West Australian Football League	Men's Seniors	16	1912, 1913, 1915, 1924, 1973, 1986, 1988, 2004, 2006, 2007, 2008, 2014, 2015, 2018, 2019, 2021
West Australian Football League	Men's Reserves	18	1928, 1929, 1931, 1958, 1959, 1969, 1972, 1984, 1995, 1997, 1998, 1999, 2002, 2003, 2005, 2007, 2017, 2018, 2022
West Australian Football League	Colts (Boys U19)	4	1974, 1989, 2018, 2020
West Australian Football League	Fourths (1965–1974)	1	1970
Other titles and honours
Rodriguez Shield	Multiple	12	1970, 1973, 1986, 1995, 2003, 2005, 2006, 2008, 2014, 2015, 2017, 2018, 2019
State Premiership	Men's Seniors (1902–1924)	2	1913, 1924
Finishing positions
West Australian Football League	Minor premiership (men's seniors)	19	1912, 1913, 1925, 1935, 1943, 1973, 1986, 1995, 2003, 2004, 2005, 2006, 2008, 2015, 2016, 2017, 2018, 2019, 2021
West Australian Football League	Runners-up (men's seniors)	15	1925, 1926, 1931, 1933, 1935, 1959, 1985, 1987, 1991, 1995, 2003, 2009, 2011, 2016, 2017
West Australian Football League	Wooden spoons (men's seniors)	21	1901, 1902, 1903, 1905, 1906, 1907, 1908, 1916, 1937, 1947, 1949, 1950, 1953, 1954, 1955, 1967, 1976, 1979, 1980, 1982, 1996
West Australian Football League	Minor premiership (women's seniors)	2	2019, 2020
West Australian Football League	Runners-up (women's seniors)	1	2020

=== Individual honours ===
Sandover Medal Winners: (10 total) 1921: Tom Outridge, 1935: Lou Daily, 1938: Haydn Bunton Sr, 1939: Haydn Bunton Sr, 1941: Haydn Bunton Sr, 1991: Ian Dargie, 1994: Ian Dargie, 2000: Richard Ambrose, 2002/2004: Allistair Pickett, 2006: Matthew Priddis, 2019: Lachlan Delahunty

Dhara Kerr Medalists: (4 total) 2019: Hayley Miller & Danika Pisconeri, 2020: Danika Pisconeri, 2025: Krstel Petrevski

Simpson Medalists: (9 total) 1973: Dennis Blair, 1985: Brian Taylor, 1986: Mark Zanotti, 1988: Mick Lee, 2004: Paul Vines, 2006: Marc Webb, 2007: Brad Smith, 2008: Chris Hall, 2014: Jason Bristow, 2015: Matt Boland

Bernie Naylor Medalists: (22 total) 1913: H. Limb (40), 1915: H. Limb (46), 1920: Pat Rodriguez (36), 1957: Don Glass (83), 1962: Austin Robertson Jr. (89), 1964: Austin Robertson Jr. (96), 1968: Austin Robertson Jr. (162), 1969: Austin Robertson Jr. (114), 1970: Austin Robertson Jr. (116), 1971: Austin Robertson Jr. (111), 1972: Austin Robertson Jr. (98), 1987: Todd Breman (111), 1988: Todd Breman (75), 1993: Jason Heatley (111), 1995: Jason Heatley (123), 1998: Todd Ridley (77), 2003: Brad Smith (84), 2004: Brad Smith (109), 2005: Lachlan Oakley (83), 2007: Brad Smith (126), 2008: Brad Smith (104), 2011: Blake Broadhurst (68), 2015: Shane Yarran (46)

JJ Leonard Medalists: 2002: Kevan Sparks, 2004: Peter German, 2015: Jarrad Schofield, 2018: Jarrad Schofield, 2019: Beau Wardman

Tassie Medal Winners: (1 total) 1969: Peter Eakins

All Australians: 1966: Brian Sarre, 1969: Peter Eakins, 1972: George Young, 1986: Laurie Keene, 1986: Andrew MacNish

== Records ==
Record Home Attendance: 21 088 v. Claremont on 2 June 1986

Highest Score: 29.33 (207) v. Peel Thunder on 3 May 2008 and 33.9 (207) v South Fremantle on 28 August 2010

Lowest Score: 0.0 (0) v. South Fremantle on 4 August 1906

Lowest Scores since 1919: 1.2 (8) vs. East Perth on 7 August 1920 and 1.5 (11) v. East Fremantle on 24 July 1954

Longest Winning Streak: 25 games from Grand Final, 2017 to Round 6, 2019 (including 2018 premiership)

Longest Losing Streak: 24 games from Round 1, 1902 to Round 9, 1903

== Team of the Century ==
Subiaco's Team of the Century was selected in 2008.

== Honourboards ==
=== League ===
This table lists the coaches, captains, best-and-fairest winners and leading goalscorers for Subiaco since 1920. Data for goalkickers are sketchy before the late 1920s

Season	Place	Record	Coach	Captain	Best & Fairest (Tom Outridge Medal)	Leading goalkicker
1920	4th	7–8–1	Wally Steele	Wally Steele	Wally Steele	Pat Rodriguez (36)
1921	5th	6–8–1	Wally Steele	Harry Morgan	Tom Outridge Sr.	
1922	5th	4–11	Jack Leckie; Wally Steele	Wally Steele	Tom Outridge Sr.	
1923	5th	5–10	Tom Outridge Sr.	Tom Outridge Sr.	Snowy Hamilton	
1924	Premiers	10–7–1	Tom Cain	Snowy Hamilton	Snowy Hamilton	
1925	R/Up	10–6–1	Tom Cain	George Scaddan	Bill Brophy	
1926	R/Up	10–9–1	Tom Cain	Snowy Hamilton	Johnny Leonard	Pat Rodriguez (52)
1927	4th	10–9	Sam Gravenall	Tom Outridge Sr.	Johnny Leonard	Len Metherell (49)
1928	4th	10–9	Alec Robinson	George Pengel	Johnny Leonard	Bert Nissen (54)
1929	4th	9–10	Alec Robinson	Tom Outridge Sr.	Johnny Leonard	Bert Nissen (57)
1930	4th	9–10	Arthur Green	Johnny Leonard	Johnny Leonard	Geoff Smith (30)
1931	R/Up	13–8	Arthur Green	Bill Brophy	Billy Faul	Stewart Daily (44)
1932	5th	8–10	Arthur Green	Bill Brophy	Peter Mackay; Stewart Daily	Harold Bancroft (58)
1933	R/Up	9–12	Arthur Green	Johnny Grigg	Geoff Smith	Bert Nissen (53)
1934	6th	7–13–1	Arthur Green	Geoff Smith	John Bowe; Geoff Smith	Jack Jennings (92)
1935	R/Up	15–5	Frank Murphy	Frank Murphy	Lou Daily	Jack Jennings (93)
1936	4th	11–10	Frank Murphy	Frank Murphy	Lou Daily	Jack Jennings (52)
1937	8th	4–17	Frank Murphy	Frank Murphy	Lou Daily	Les Mills (36)
1938	7th	8–12	Haydn Bunton Sr.	Haydn Bunton Sr.	Haydn Bunton Sr.	Haydn Bunton Sr. (51)
1939	7th	3–17	Haydn Bunton Sr. Keith Shea	Haydn Bunton Sr. Keith Shea	Haydn Bunton Sr.	Haydn Bunton Sr. (59)
1940	6th	5–14–1	Arthur Green	Lloyd Strack	Les Hardiman	Haydn Bunton Sr. (34)
1941	6th	7–13	Haydn Bunton Sr.	Haydn Bunton Sr.	Haydn Bunton Sr.	Haydn Bunton Sr. (46)
1942; Underage Comp	5th	7–9–1	Bill Brophy	Bob Herd; Wally Bone	Trevor Preston; Wally Bone	John Hetherington (67)
1943; Underage Comp	3rd	13–6	Bill Brophy	Bill Mackey	Merv Beckham	Ernie Tonkinson (59)
1944; Underage Comp	5th	8–11	Bill Brophy	Stan Prouse; Merv Beckham	Merv Beckham	Ernie Tonkinson (71)
1945	5th	10–10	Seff Parry	Ossie Diggins	Leo Hickey	Jack Cooper (43)
1946	3rd	11–10	Frank Murphy	Fred Williams	Fred Williams	Fred Williams (22)
1947	8th	3–16	Seff Parry	Fred Williams	Bill Alderman	Bill Ralph (27)
1948	7th	5–14	Fred Williams	Fred Williams	Albert “Bub” Howe	Jeff Smith (34)
1949	8th	2–16	Fred Williams	Fred Williams	Colin Davey	Bob Lindsay (30)
1950	8th	5–16	Jack Sweet	Jack Sweet	Neil Althorpe	Bob Lindsay (30)
1951	7th	4–17	Jack Sweet	Jack Sweet	Don Carter	Ernie Hagdorn (27)
1952	7th	3–17	Jack Sweet	Jeff Smith	Jeff Smith	Jeff Smith (27)
1953	8th	2–19	Jesse Newton	Jeff Smith	Don Carter	Colin Davey (23); Trevor Buggins (23)
1954	8th	4–16	Charlie Strang	Don Carter	Don Carter	Alan White (27)
1955	8th	4–16	Charlie Strang	Ron Jarvis	Peter Amaranti	Warwick Denton (33)
1956	7th	6–13	Charlie Tyson	Charlie Tyson	Charlie Tyson	Don Glass (52)
1957	6th	7–14	Charlie Tyson	Charlie Tyson	Don Glass	Don Glass (83)
1958	5th	10–11	Charlie Tyson	Charlie Tyson	Tom Robbins	Don Glass (49)
1959	R/Up	14–10	Charlie Tyson	Charlie Tyson	Don Glass	Reg Hampson (60)
1960	5th	12–9	Charlie Tyson	Charlie Tyson	Laurie Kettlewell	Reg Hampson (61)
1961	3rd	12–11	Dan Murray	Laurie Kettlewell	Tom Robbins	Reg Hampson (50)
1962	7th	8–12–1	Dave Cuzens	Dave Cuzens	Laurie Kettlewell	Austin Robertson Jr. (89)
1963	6th	8–13	Dave Cuzens; Bob Browning	Keven Merifield	Wally Martin	Austin Robertson Jr. (79)
1964	4th	13–8–1	Keith Slater	Keith Slater	Wally Martin	Austin Robertson Jr. (94)
1965	7th	8–12	Keith Slater	Kevin Merifield	Austin Robertson Jr.	Austin Robertson Jr. (108)
1966	7th	6–14–1	Keith Slater	Keith Slater	Ross Gosden	Kevin Merifield (27)
1967	8th	3–18	Alan Killigrew	Reg Hampson	Cam Blakemore	Austin Robertson Jr. (104)
1968	4th	12–10	Haydn Bunton Jr.	Haydn Bunton Jr.	Austin Robertson Jr.	Austin Robertson Jr. (162)
1969	4th	12–10	Haydn Bunton Jr.	Haydn Bunton Jr.	Cam Blakemore	Austin Robertson Jr. (104)
1970	4th	13–9	Haydn Bunton Jr.	Haydn Bunton Jr.	Cam Blakemore	Austin Robertson Jr. (116)
1971	5th	10–11	Haydn Bunton Jr.	Colin Williams	Keith Watt	Austin Robertson Jr. (111)
1972	6th	8–13	Haydn Bunton Jr.	Peter Metropolis	Brian Sierakowski	Austin Robertson Jr. (98)
1973	Premiers	18–6	Ross G. Smith	Ross G. Smith	Mike Fitzpatrick	Austin Robertson Jr. (77)
1974	4th	12–10	Ross G. Smith	Ross G. Smith	Mike Fitzpatrick	Austin Robertson Jr. (59)
1975	7th	9–12	David Parkin	David Parkin; Peter Burton	Peter Burton	Neil Randall (43)
1976	8th	4–17	Jack Ensor	Peter Burton	Neil Randall	Gary Fathers (35)
1977	6th	7–14	Brian Douge	Brian Douge	Peter Featherby	Gary Fathers (84)
1978	7th	5–16	Brian Douge	Brian Douge	Peter Featherby	Mick Malone (54)
1979	8th	3–18	Peter Burton	Brian Douge	Alex Hamilton	Graeme Schultz (38)
1980	8th	2–19	Ken Armstrong	Brian Douge	Alex Hamilton	Peter Munro (61)
1981	5th	9–12	Ken Armstrong	Brian Douge	Neil Taylor	Gary Buckenara (42)
1982	8th	1–20	Ken Armstrong	Neil Taylor	Dwayne Lamb	Brian Taylor (34)
1983	7th	4–17	Peter Daniels; Brian Fairclough	Neil Taylor	Neil Taylor	Clinton Brown (59)
1984	7th	9–12	Haydn Bunton Jr.	Neil Taylor	Dwayne Lamb	Clinton Brown (54)
1985	R/Up	16–8	Haydn Bunton Jr.	Neil Taylor	Dwayne Lamb	Laurie Keene (78)
1986	Premiers	19–5	Haydn Bunton Jr.	Neil Taylor	Laurie Keene	Stephen Sells (74)
1987	R/Up	15–8–1	Haydn Bunton Jr.	Neil Taylor	Greg Wilkinson	Todd Breman (111)
1988	Premiers	16–8	Haydn Bunton Jr.	Greg Wilkinson	Brian Taylor	Todd Breman (77)
1989	6th	6–15	Haydn Bunton Jr.	Brian Taylor	Brad McDougall	Brett Heady (35)
1990	7th	6–15	Haydn Bunton Jr.	Brian Taylor	Damian Hampson	Wayne Golding (38)
1991	R/Up	15–10	Haydn Bunton Jr.	Brian Taylor	Andrew MacNish	Todd Breman (55)
1992	5th	11–11	Haydn Bunton Jr.	Rod Willet	Phil Scott	Rod Willet (43)
1993	3rd	12–12	Tony Solin	David Snow	Rod Willet	Jason Heatley (111)
1994	4th	14–9	Tony Solin	David Snow	Ian Dargie	Jason Heatley (81)
1995	R/Up	20–4	Gary Buckenara	Dwayne Lamb	Andrew Donnelly	Jason Heatley (123)
1996	8th	6–15	Gary Buckenara	Dwayne Lamb	Nathan O'Connor	Jason Heatley (55)
1997	7th	9–11	Peter Thorne	Jay Burton	Damian Hampson	Todd Breman (43)
1998	3rd	12–10	Peter Thorne	Damian Hampson	Todd Ridley	Todd Ridley (73)
1999	3rd	15–7	Kevan Sparks	Damian Hampson	Nathan O'Connor	Todd Ridley (45)
2000	3rd	12–8	Kevan Sparks	Tony Godden; Michael Symons	Michael Symons	Brad Smith (33)
2001	4th	9–9–1	Kevan Sparks	Tony Godden; Michael Symons	Richard Maloney	Ben Knights (38)
2002	3rd	13–7	Kevan Sparks	Tony Godden	David Lucas	Luke Toia (23)
2003	R/Up	17–5	Peter German	Richard Maloney	Marc Webb	Brad Smith (84)
2004	Premiers	17–5	Peter German	Richard Maloney	Allistair Pickett	Brad Smith (109)
2005	3rd	18–4	Peter German	Marc Webb	Matt Priddis	Lachlan Oakley (80)
2006	Premiers	20–2	Peter German	Marc Webb	Mark Haynes	David Mapleston (57)
2007	Premiers	18–4	Scott Watters	Marc Webb	Brad Smith	Brad Smith (126)
2008	Premiers	21–1	Scott Watters	Marc Webb	Greg Broughton	Brad Smith (110)
2009	R/Up	14–9	Scott Watters	Brad Smith	Shaun Hildebrandt	Trent Dennis-Lane (66)
2010	6th	10–10	Chris Waterman	Aidan Parker	Blake Broadhurst	Blake Broadhurst (56)
2011	R/Up	14–9	Chris Waterman	Aidan Parker	Kyal Horsley	Blake Broadhurst (68)
2012	7th	7–13	Chris Waterman	Aidan Parker	Aidan Parker	Blake Broadhurst (32)
2013	8th	6–14	Jarrad Schofield	Aidan Parker	George Hampson; Brett Mahoney	Brad Stevenson (20)
2014	Premiers	16–7	Jarrad Schofield	Kyal Horsley	Kyal Horsley	Matthew Boland (53)
2015	Premiers	19–4	Jarrad Schofield	Kyal Horsley	Chris Phelan	Shane Yarran (46)
2016	R/Up	16–4	Jarrad Schofield	Kyal Horsley	Chris Phelan	Hamish Shepheard (51)
2017	R/Up	16–4	Jarrad Schofield	Kyal Horsley	Leigh Kitchin	Liam Ryan (73)
2018	Premiers	20–0	Jarrad Schofield	Kyal Horsley	Kyal Horsley	Ben Sokol (43)
2019	Premiers	19–1	Beau Wardman	Leigh Kitchin	Kyal Horsley	Ben Sokol (51)
2020	6th	4–4	Beau Wardman	Leigh Kitchin	Kyle Stainsby	Nicholas Martin (19)
2021	Premiers	16–4	Beau Wardman	Leigh Kitchin	Leigh Kitchin	Ben Sokol (45)
2022	7th	7–11	Beau Wardman	Leigh Kitchin	Stef Giro	Ben Sokol (41)
2023	3rd	12–6	Beau Wardman	Leigh Kitchin	Zac Clarke	Ben Sokol (53)
2024	7th	6–12	Beau Wardman	Greg Clark	Galen Savigni	Ryan Borchet (29)
2025	9th	4-14	Beau Wardman	Greg Clark	Jack Mayo	Ryan Borchet (28)

=== Women's ===
This table includes seasons during the WAFLW competition and not the WAWFL competition.

Season	Place	Record	Coach	Captain	Best & Fairest (Sarah Michell Medal)	Leading goalkicker
2019	1st	9-3	Sarah Michell	Hayley Miller & Danika Pisconeri	Hayley Miller & Lara Filacamo	
2020	1st	6-1	Amy Lavell	Danika Pisconeri	Tiah Haynes	
2021	4th	8-7	Michael Farmer	Tarni Golisano	Jess Ritchie	
2022	5th	6-8	Michael Farmer	Tarni Golisano	Jayme Harken	
2023	5th	7-6-1	Michael Farmer	Tarni Golisano	Tarni Golisano	
2024	5th	6-8	Baker Denneman	Tess Lyons	Krstel Petrevski	
2025	2nd	12-3-1	Baker Denneman	Tess Lyons	Krstel Petrevski	

== AFL/VFL players (including rookies) ==
Subiaco has a relationship with the VFL/AFL dating back to the start of the 20th century, with numerous players moving in both directions to and from Victoria and Western Australia. The list below is a summary of Subiaco footballers who have achieved the highest individual honours while playing for a VFL/AFL club.

- Brownlow Medal: Haydn Bunton Sr. (1931, 1932, 1935), Ross Smith (1967), Matt Priddis (2014)
- Norm Smith Medal: Dean Kemp (1994)
- All-Australian team: Dean Kemp (1992), Mitchell White (1996), David Mundy (2015), Matt Priddis (2015), Liam Ryan (2020)
- VFL/AFL Premiership: Brighton Diggins (1933, 1938), Ross Smith (1966), Neil Balme (1973, 1974), Brian Douge (1976), Mike Fitzpatrick (1979, 1981, 1982), Gary Buckenara (1983, 1986, 1988, 1989), Brett Heady (1992, 1994), Dean Kemp (1992, 1994), Dwayne Lamb (1992), Karl Langdon (1992), Mitchell White (1992), Drew Banfield (1994, 2006), Matthew Connell (1997, 1998), Des Headland (2002), Jarrad Schofield (2004), Liam Ryan (2018), Dom Sheed (2018)

== See also ==
- Wikipedia listing of Subiaco Football Club players
