= Golisano =

Golisano is a surname. Notable people with the surname include:

- Francesco Golisano (1930–1991), Italian film actor
- Tarnica Golisano (born 1996), Australian rules footballer
- Tom Golisano (born 1941), American billionaire businessman, philanthropist, and author
