= Aidan Parker =

Australian rules footballer (born 1983)

Personal information
- Full name: Aidan William John Parker
- Born: 25 January 1983 (age 43)
- Original team: Carine JFC
- Draft: 45th overall, 2003 Rookie Draft (Adelaide)
- Height: 194 cm (6 ft 4 in)
- Weight: 99 kg (218 lb)
- Position: Centre half-back

Club information
- Current club: Subiaco
- Number: 9

Playing career^{1}
Years	Club	Games (Goals)
2001–02; 2005–13	Subiaco	231 (22)
2003–04	South Adelaide	26 (3)
2004	Glenelg	12 (0)
Total		269 (25)

Representative team honours
Years	Team	Games (Goals)
2006–12	Western Australia	5 (0)
- ^{1} Playing statistics correct to the end of 2013.

Career highlights
- Subiaco premiership side 2006, 2007, 2008; Subiaco co-captain 2009; Subiaco captain 2010–13

Aidan William John Parker (born 25 January 1983) is a former Australian rules footballer who captained the Subiaco Football Club in the West Australian Football League (WAFL), was rookie-listed with Adelaide in the Australian Football League (AFL), and played for South Adelaide and Glenelg in the South Australian National Football League (SANFL). Parker played in three premierships for Subiaco, and also represented Western Australia in five interstate matches.

== Career ==
Originally playing for Carine Junior Football Club, Parker made his senior WAFL debut for Subiaco against Perth in round one of the 2001 season. He was recruited by Adelaide in the AFL with pick 45 in the 2003 Rookie Draft, and assigned to South Australian National Football League (SANFL) club South Adelaide. Parker did not play a senior game for Adelaide in 2003, but played every game for South Adelaide. He requested a transfer midway through the 2004 season citing lack of opportunity at South Adelaide, and was transferred to Glenelg, where he played the remainder of the season. He was de-listed by Adelaide at the end of the 2004 season, and returned to Subiaco.

Parker was appointed a vice-captain of Subiaco for the 2005 season, and played 22 games for the season, including the Lions' grand final loss against South Fremantle. Parker played every game at Subiaco between 2006 and 2009, including the club's 2006, 2007 and 2008 premiership victories. He was appointed co-captain of the club in 2009, alongside Brad Smith and Kyal Horsley, and participated in the club's grand final loss to South Fremantle. He was appointed sole captain of the club for the 2010 season, and continued this role until his retirement at the end of the 2013 season. During this time he played over 150 consecutive WAFL games. Parker played representative football for the WAFL in 2006, 2007, 2008, 2009 and 2012, and captained Subiaco in the 2011 WAFL Grand Final.
