= 1926 WAFL season =

Football Season

- Teams: 7
- Premiers: East Perth; 6th premiership
- Minor premiers: East Perth; 6th minor premiership
- Sandover Medallist: Johnny Leonard (Subiaco)
- Bernie Naylor Medallist: Bonny Campbell (East Perth)
- Matches played: 66

The 1926 WAFL season was the 42nd season of senior football in Perth, Western Australia.

Desire had existed upon some stakeholders to expand the competition ever since it contracted to six clubs during World War I, but because districts were not applied to the senior competition until 1925, the leading contenders, former club Midland Junction and established B-grade club Claremont-Cottesloe, were not able to attract or keep top players. Claremont, wearing the blue and gold colours of the local swimming club, were admitted at a meeting on 19 August 1925 and made their debut in 1926 but former “B” grade Claremont juniors with established WAFL clubs like Jerry Dolan and Pat Rodriguez were permitted to stay with their current clubs. Claremont had an exceedingly inexperienced team and were only able to win one game and that by a single point. Patronisingly called the “babies” in their early years in the WAFL, Claremont were not to finish above second-last in their first ten seasons, and were not helped by being the worst sufferer from the interstate recruiting drives of VFL clubs when the Great Depression began.

With the return of champion coach Phil Matson after he was widely tipped to take over the reins at Richmond, East Perth won their sixth premiership in eight seasons. West Perth, who had been last in 1924 but had a new grandstand constructed during the season at their eleven-year-old home base of Leederville, rivalled them until September before the Royals showed themselves clearly the best team in the run home. Subiaco, who had developed what many regard as the best team it ever fielded in the previous season, were disappointing until a stirring run from a mathematical chance for the four drives them to the Grand Final only to be thrashed – a scenario repeated by the Maroons in 1933.

== Home-and-away season ==
=== Round 1 ===
	Round 1
Saturday, 24 April (2:45 pm)	Claremont-Cottesloe 6.10 (46)	def. by	East Perth 16.21 (117)	Claremont Showground
Saturday, 24 April (2:45 pm)	East Fremantle 7.12 (54)	def.	Perth 6.8 (44)	Fremantle Oval
Saturday, 24 April (2:45 pm)	Subiaco 11.7 (73)	def. by	South Fremantle 11.10 (76)	Subiaco Oval
	Bye; West Perth
Claremont-Cottesloe make their league debut with only one established player in Norm McIntosh (formerly of Richmond) and are outplayed but viewed as “promising”.

=== Round 2 ===
	Round 2
Saturday, 1 May (2:45 pm)	Perth 9.11 (65)	def.	East Perth 9.10 (64)	WACA
Saturday, 1 May (2:45 pm)	South Fremantle 9.10 (64)	def.	East Fremantle 8.10 (58)	Fremantle Oval
Saturday, 1 May (2:45 pm)	Subiaco 11.14 (80)	def. by	West Perth 7.14 (56)	Subiaco Oval
	Bye; Claremont-Cottesloe

=== Round 3 ===
	Round 3
Saturday, 8 May (2:45 pm)	East Perth 7.17 (59)	def.	South Fremantle 5.9 (39)	Perth Oval
Saturday, 8 May (2:45 pm)	Claremont-Cottesloe 7.8 (50)	def. by	Subiaco 15.19 (109)	Claremont Showground
Saturday, 8 May (2:45 pm)	East Fremantle 7.8 (50)	def. by	West Perth 9.4 (58)	Fremantle Oval
	Bye; Perth

=== Round 4 ===
	Round 4
Saturday, 15 May (2:45 pm)	Claremont-Cottesloe 9.8 (62)	def. by	East Fremantle 22.13 (145)	Claremont Showground
Saturday, 15 May (2:45 pm)	Perth 11.6 (72)	def.	Subiaco 8.4 (52)	WACA
Saturday, 15 May (2:45 pm)	West Perth 7.9 (51)	def. by	East Perth 8.11 (59)	Leederville Oval
	Bye; South Fremantle
Despite steady rain in what became a record wet year, East Fremantle kick the highest score in the WAFL since 1917, when Perth kicked 24.21 (165) against defunct Midland Junction.

=== Round 5 ===
	Round 5
Saturday, 22 May (2:45 pm)	West Perth 18.20 (128)	def.	Claremont-Cottesloe 8.10 (58)	Leederville Oval
Saturday, 22 May (2:45 pm)	East Perth 8.14 (62)	def. by	East Fremantle 10.10 (70)	Perth Oval
Saturday, 22 May (2:45 pm)	South Fremantle 8.12 (60)	def.	Perth 8.9 (57)	Fremantle Oval
	Bye; Subiaco
After Perth came back from three to four goals down all afternoon, Sol Lawn kicked the winning goal when he received a wild kick to open spaces with ninety seconds remaining.

=== Round 6 ===
	Round 6
Saturday, 29 May (2:45 pm)	Subiaco 5.13 (43)	def. by	East Fremantle 8.7 (55)	Subiaco Oval
Saturday, 29 May (2:45 pm)	South Fremantle 11.11 (77)	def.	Claremont-Cottesloe 7.2 (44)	Fremantle Oval
Saturday, 29 May (2:45 pm)	Perth 11.11 (77)	def. by	West Perth 13.18 (96)	WACA
	Bye; East Perth

=== Round 7 ===
	Round 7
Saturday, 5 June (2:45 pm)	Claremont-Cottesloe 6.12 (48)	def. by	Perth 22.17 (149)	Claremont Showground
Saturday, 5 June (2:45 pm)	West Perth 11.10 (76)	def.	South Fremantle 11.8 (74)	Leederville Oval
Saturday, 5 June (2:45 pm)	East Perth 8.6 (54)	def.	Subiaco 8.5 (53)	Perth Oval
	Bye; East Fremantle
Perth’s thrashing of Claremont-Cottesloe is the second time in four games the new team concedes the highest score in the WAFL since 1917.

=== Round 8 (Foundation Day) ===
	Round 8
Monday, 7 June (2:45 pm)	South Fremantle 12.9 (81)	def.	Subiaco 10.14 (74)	Fremantle Oval
Monday, 7 June (2:45 pm)	East Perth 9.20 (74)	def.	Claremont-Cottesloe 7.11 (53)	Perth Oval
Monday, 7 June (2:45 pm)	Perth 9.9 (63)	def.	East Fremantle 9.8 (62)	WACA
	Bye; West Perth
The match between Perth and East Fremantle features a remarkable scoreline with quarter-time margins totalling only 4 points (1, 2, 0 and 1 points).

=== Round 9 ===
	Round 9
Saturday, 12 June (2:45 pm)	West Perth 13.14 (92)	def.	Subiaco 9.11 (65)	Leederville Oval
Saturday, 12 June (2:45 pm)	East Fremantle 8.20 (68)	def.	South Fremantle 2.7 (19)	Fremantle Oval
Saturday, 12 June (2:45 pm)	East Perth 15.18 (108)	def.	Perth 10.5 (65)	Perth Oval
	Bye; Claremont-Cottesloe
South Fremantle’s score remains their lowest in open-age competition since scoring only 1.8 (14) against Subiaco in 1918.

=== Round 10 ===
	Round 10
Saturday, 19 June (2:45 pm)	West Perth 7.14 (56)	def. by	East Fremantle 9.9 (63)	Leederville Oval
Saturday, 19 June (2:45 pm)	Subiaco 19.9 (123)	def.	Claremont-Cottesloe 4.9 (33)	Subiaco Oval
Saturday, 19 June (2:45 pm)	South Fremantle 5.6 (36)	def. by	East Perth 15.15 (105)	Fremantle Oval
	Bye; Perth
Pat Rodriguez kicks ten goals for Subiaco despite wet conditions, the first time this had been accomplished for the club.

=== Round 11 ===
	Round 11
Saturday, 26 June (2:45 pm)	East Perth 14.9 (93)	def.	West Perth 11.10 (76)	Perth Oval (crowd:)
Saturday, 26 June (2:45 pm)	East Fremantle 13.17 (95)	def.	Claremont-Cottesloe 11.6 (72)	Fremantle Oval
Saturday, 26 June (2:45 pm)	Subiaco 11.11 (77)	def.	Perth 10.15 (75)	Subiaco Oval
	Bye; South Fremantle
Subiaco continue their improved form following five consecutive losses to come back and defeat the Redlegs in a stirring match where they withstand the black and reds in the final minute.

=== Round 12 ===
	Round 12
Saturday, 3 July (2:45 pm)	Claremont-Cottesloe 9.10 (64)	def. by	West Perth 14.18 (102)	Claremont Showground
Saturday, 3 July (2:45 pm)	Perth 12.15 (87)	def.	South Fremantle 4.7 (31)	WACA
Saturday, 3 July (2:45 pm)	East Fremantle 8.19 (67)	def.	East Perth 6.9 (45)	Fremantle Oval
	Bye; Subiaco
East Fremantle take top position from the Royals with an excellent win despite some exceptionally bad misses from in front and close-in.

=== Round 13 ===
	Round 13
Saturday, 10 July (2:45 pm)	West Perth 9.11 (65)	def.	Perth 6.10 (46)	Leederville Oval
Saturday, 10 July (2:45 pm)	East Fremantle 11.7 (73)	def.	Subiaco 9.10 (64)	Fremantle Oval
Saturday, 10 July (2:45 pm)	Claremont-Cottesloe 8.17 (65)	def. by	South Fremantle 16.10 (106)	Claremont Showground
	Bye; East Perth

=== Round 14 ===
	Round 14
Saturday, 17 July (2:45 pm)	Perth 12.16 (88)	def.	Claremont-Cottesloe 8.11 (59)	WACA
Saturday, 17 July (2:45 pm)	Subiaco 10.9 (69)	drew with	East Perth 9.15 (69)	Subiaco Oval
Saturday, 17 July (2:45 pm)	South Fremantle 5.14 (44)	def. by	West Perth 7.11 (53)	Fremantle Oval
	Bye; East Fremantle
Perth’s ability to turn “every fleeting attack” into a goal allows it to beat the fledgling club despite having little play on a WACA ground turned into a lake by continuous rain.; East Perth recorded only their second draw since entering the WAFA in 1906 and first since the fourth round of 1908.; The following week, WAFL games were suspended to play an interstate match against Victoria.

=== Round 15 ===
	Round 15
Saturday, 31 July (2:45 pm)	South Fremantle 10.17 (77)	def.	East Perth 3.11 (29)	Fremantle Oval
Saturday, 31 July (2:45 pm)	Subiaco 11.12 (78)	def.	Claremont-Cottesloe 9.11 (65)	Subiaco Oval
Saturday, 31 July (2:45 pm)	West Perth 12.13 (85)	def.	East Fremantle 5.9 (39)	Leederville Oval
	Bye; Perth
South Fremantle unexpectedly crush an East Perth team lacking Duffy, Owens, Campbell and Sherlock.; West Perth’s win leaves the equal at the top with Old Easts, who played far below form despite lacking notable absentees.

=== Round 16 ===
	Round 16
Saturday, 7 August (2:45 pm)	Perth 7.10 (52)	def. by	South Fremantle 12.9 (81)	WACA
Saturday, 7 August (2:45 pm)	Claremont-Cottesloe 4.13 (37)	def. by	West Perth 9.19 (73)	Claremont Showground
Saturday, 7 August (2:45 pm)	East Perth 10.8 (68)	def.	East Fremantle 8.6 (54)	Subiaco Oval
	Bye; Subiaco

=== Round 17 ===
	Round 17
Saturday, 14 August (2:45 pm)	Subiaco 7.18 (60)	def.	East Fremantle 6.4 (40)	Subiaco Oval
Saturday, 14 August (2:45 pm)	West Perth 12.16 (88)	def.	Perth 12.7 (79)	Leederville Oval
Saturday, 14 August (2:45 pm)	South Fremantle 7.10 (52)	def. by	Claremont-Cottesloe 7.11 (53)	Fremantle Oval
	Bye; East Perth
West Perth’s narrow win enables them to take top position with the Royals having the bye.; Claremont-Cottesloe by the narrowest of margins achieve their first WAFL win after South Fremantle attacked for ten minutes but scored only 0.3 (3).

=== Round 18 ===
	Round 18
Saturday, 21 August (2:45 pm)	Perth 11.19 (85)	def.	Claremont-Cottesloe 9.10 (64)	WACA
Saturday, 21 August (2:45 pm)	Subiaco 8.6 (54)	def. by	East Perth 12.14 (86)	Subiaco Oval
Saturday, 21 August (2:45 pm)	South Fremantle 10.8 (68)	def. by	West Perth 15.12 (102)	Fremantle Oval
	Bye; East Fremantle
East Perth, with only seventeen men after half-time as “Digger” Thomas breaks his jaw, easily win a Grand Final preview.

=== Round 19 ===
	Round 19
Saturday, 4 September (2:45 pm)	East Fremantle 12.14 (86)	def.	Claremont-Cottesloe 9.11 (65)	Fremantle Oval
Saturday, 4 September (2:45 pm)	Perth 5.4 (34)	def. by	Subiaco 4.13 (37)	WACA
Saturday, 4 September (2:45 pm)	East Perth 21.8 (134)	def.	West Perth 10.11 (71)	Perth Oval
	Bye; South Fremantle
“Bonny” Campbell breaks his own record with seven goals for a total of seventy-two as East Perth play brilliantly in the meeting for top spot, with rover Duffy their star.; The score was East Perth’s first-ever twenty-goal score, though they had scored 19.20 (134) against North Fremantle in 1915.

=== Round 20 ===
	Round 20
Saturday, 11 September (2:45 pm)	East Fremantle 9.12 (66)	def.	Perth 8.10 (58)	Fremantle Oval
Saturday, 11 September (2:45 pm)	Subiaco 19.18 (132)	def.	South Fremantle 8.7 (55)	Subiaco Oval
Saturday, 11 September (2:45 pm)	Claremont-Cottesloe 9.7 (61)	def. by	East Perth 16.14 (110)	Claremont Showground
	Bye; West Perth
Subiaco, who had looked out of the running a month ago, seize fourth position with their victory, leaving their last round match with West Perth to potentially decide both fourth position and the minor premiership.

=== Round 21 ===
	Round 21
Saturday, 18 September (2:45 pm)	East Perth 15.17 (107)	def.	Perth 10.11 (71)	Perth Oval
Saturday, 18 September (2:45 pm)	West Perth 4.13 (37)	def. by	Subiaco 9.16 (70)	Leederville Oval
Saturday, 18 September (2:45 pm)	East Fremantle 12.9 (81)	def.	South Fremantle 11.13 (79)	Fremantle Oval
	Bye; Claremont-Cottesloe
Subiaco spoil the opening of Leederville Oval’s new grandstand before the match and 1925 wooden spooners South Fremantle’s hope to regain fourth place with their convincing win.; After not scoring for a quarter-and-a-half after half-time, Old Easts produce an amazing rally to defeat their post rivals after a wonderful goal by Jones where he dodges half a dozen opponents before kicking straight.

== Ladder ==
1926 WAFL ladder
Pos	Team	Pld	W	L	D	PF	PA	PP	Pts
1	East Perth (P)	18	13	4	1	1443	1078	133.9	54
2	East Fremantle	18	12	6	0	1226	1067	114.9	48
3	West Perth	18	12	6	0	1365	1200	113.8	48
4	Subiaco	18	9	8	1	1313	1103	119.0	38
5	South Fremantle	18	8	10	0	1119	1268	88.2	32
6	Perth	18	7	11	0	1267	1219	103.9	28
7	Claremont-Cottesloe	18	1	17	0	999	1797	55.6	4

Rules for classification: 1) points; 2) percentage; 3) number of points for.
(P) Premiers

== Finals ==
=== First semi-final ===
	First semi-final
Saturday, 25 September (2:45 pm)	West Perth 8.9 (57)	def. by	Subiaco 8.14 (62)	Perth Oval (crowd: 7,629)
Subiaco come back from a half-time deficit to repeat their last-round win.

=== Second semi-final ===
	Second semi-final
Saturday, 2 October (2:45 pm)	East Perth 11.17 (83)	def.	East Fremantle 5.9 (39)	Subiaco Oval (crowd: 9,098)
East Perth run away after a close first half to win very easily over their rivals of the time.

=== Grand Final ===
1926 WAFL Grand Final
Saturday, 9 October (2:45 pm)	East Perth	def.	Subiaco	WACA Ground (crowd: 8,722)
0.4 (4); 6.10 (46); 8.12 (60); 11.19 (85)	Q1; Q2; Q3; Final	1.1 (7); 2.1 (13); 4.5 (29); 5.5 (35)	Umpires: Frank O‘Connor
Campbell 4, Sparrow 2, Walsh, Gepp, Hubble, Duffy, Western	Goals	Grigg 2, Cockburn, Leonard, Green
Walsh (best on ground), Guhl, O‘Meara, Gepp, Sherlock, C. Mitchell, Sparrow	Best	Outridge, Brophy, Hickey, Leonard (until injured), Green
Injuries	Leonard (concussion)
This was the last WAFL Grand Final at the WACA, and saw East Perth’s most decisive triumph during its 1919 to 1927 dynasty. Bonny Campbell took his goalkicking record to 89.
