= Fred Williams (Australian footballer, born 1919) =

Australian rules footballer and coach

Personal information
- Full name: Frederick Williams
- Born: 28 August 1919
- Died: 3 April 2007 (aged 87)
- Original team: West Subiaco (MFL)
- Height: 175 cm (5 ft 9 in)
- Weight: 78 kg (172 lb)
- Position: Utility

Playing career^{1}
Years	Club	Games (Goals)
1938–50	Subiaco	129 (unknown)

Representative team honours
Years	Team	Games (Goals)
1946–48	Western Australia	4 (1)

Coaching career
Years	Club	Games (W–L–D)
1948–49	Subiaco	37 (7–30–0)
- ^{1} Playing statistics correct to the end of 1950.

Career highlights
- Subiaco captain 1946–49; Subiaco leading goal-kicker 1946; Subiaco best and fairest 1946; Subiaco Team of the Century (2008)

Frederick "Fred" Williams (28 August 1919 – 3 April 2007) was an Australian rules football player and coach who played for the Subiaco Football Club in the Western Australian National Football League (WANFL) between 1938 and 1950, also coaching the club between 1948 and 1949. He also played representative football for Western Australia between 1946 and 1948.

== Career ==
Originally from the West Subiaco Football Club in the Metropolitan Football League (MFL), Williams made his debut for Subiaco in 1938. He left the club in June 1939 to train with the Geelong Football Club in the Victorian Football League (VFL), however, the WANFL were unwilling to approve a transfer, despite Geelong's protests. Williams returned to Subiaco for the 1940 season, which The Western Mail reported "created considerable interest, and came as a complete surprise to those 'not in the know'". In 1941, Williams finished third in the Sandover Medal behind teammate Haydn Bunton and Ern Henfry of Perth.

At the conclusion of the 1941 season, Williams enlisted in the Australian Army. He served in New Guinea and New Britain during the war, and played in several army football teams, which included captaining a team which included Bernie Naylor and other senior footballers. Williams returned to football in 1946, and was named captain, kicking 22 goals to be Subiaco's leading goalkicker, as well as winning the club's best and fairest award, the President's Trophy. He also represented Western Australia in three interstate matches during the season. When not playing football, he worked as a meter reader for the Water Supply Department. In 1948, Williams was appointed coach of Subiaco. The club was generally unsuccessful during Williams' tenure as coach, losing over 80% of its games. He resigned as both captain and coach for the 1950 season, and announced his retirement at the end of the season, having "reached the stage where he preferred to make way for another man".

In 2005, Williams was named Subiaco's "Club Legend" for the season, a WAFL initiative allowing "each club to honour a past champion by displaying their image and career details on the match ball for that particular season". He died in April 2007 at the age of 87. In 2008, Williams was named as an interchange player in Subiaco's Team of the Century.
