= Ken Armstrong (Australian footballer) =

Australian rules footballer, coach, and commentator

Personal information
- Full name: Kenneth William Armstrong
- Born: 27 January 1936
- Died: 5 November 2009 (aged 73)
- Position: Centre

Playing career^{1}
| Years | Club | Games (Goals) |
| 1955–1963 | Perth | 170 (41) |

Representative team honours^{2}
| Years | Team | Games (Goals) |
| 1959 | Western Australia | 1 (2) |

Coaching career^{3}
| Years | Club | Games (W–L–D) |
| Western Australia | 1977–78 | 6 (3–3–0) |
| Perth | 1974–79, 1991–93 | 201 (106–95–0) |
| Subiaco | 1980–82 | 62 (12–50–0) |
- ^{1} Playing statistics correct to the end of 1993.^{2} Representative statistics correct as of 1959.^{3} Coaching statistics correct as of 1982.

Kenneth William Armstrong (27 January 1936 – 5 November 2009) was an Australian rules football player, coach and commentator.

== Playing career ==
Armstrong made his Western Australian National Football League (WANFL) league debut for Perth Football Club in 1955. The same year he played in a premiership-winning team. He played until 1963 when he was transferred for work to Mount Barker.

== Coaching career ==
In three stints in the WANFL (later WAFL) Armstrong coached 265 league games. After coaching Mount Barker with some success in the late 1960s, he returned to Perth where he was a fitness trainer for the WANFL umpires in 1969 and 1970. Rejoining Perth Football Club the following year, he led the Perth reserves team to three successive grand finals, winning premierships in 1971 and 1973.

After being appointed league coach in 1974 he made an immediate impact, making the grand final in 1974. This was followed up by winning the 1976 and 1977 WANFL grand finals. After losing the 1978 grand final, and seeing Perth fall to the lower reaches of the WANFL ladder where they have remained to this day, Armstrong briefly became director of football at Perth, but one game into the 1980 season when Peter Burton resigned left to join WAFL chopping block Subiaco.

Armstrong coached three season with the Lions, but won only twelve of sixty-two games: indeed in his last season amidst popular cries of "pity poor Subi", the Lions were on target for a winless season before beating East Fremantle in their seventeenth match. Armstrong, who had never been reported either as a player or coach, was also reported in his third last match for misconduct towards field umpire John Morris after he criticised a decision, but was exonerated. After this disastrous season which had seen calls for a mid-season sacking, Armstrong was not offered another contract by the Lions and left to work as a commentator for the Australian Broadcasting Corporation (ABC).

Almost a decade after leaving coaching, Armstrong returned to Perth to coach during the 1991 season. He retired from coaching after the 1993 season.

== Personal life ==
Armstrong died in November 2009, aged 73, after a short illness. His son, Gary Armstrong, also played and coached in the WAFL, while a grandson, Steven Armstrong, spent seven seasons in the Australian Football League (AFL).
