= Balwyn Football Club =

Names
- Full name: Balwyn Football Club
- Nickname(s): Tigers

Club details
- Founded: 1909; 116 years ago
- Colours
- Competition: Eastern Football League
- President: Vin O'Halloran
- Premierships: List: Victorian Football League sub-districts competition: 1927; Eastern Suburban Football League: 1933, 1934; South East Suburban Football League: 1989; Southern Football League: 1998, 1999, 2000, 2003, 2005; Eastern Football League: 2008, 2012, 2013, 2015, 2016, 2024, 2025
- Ground(s): Balwyn Park

Uniforms
Home	Away

Other information
- Official website: https://www.balwynfc.com.au/

The Balwyn Football Club is an Australian rules football club located in the eastern Melbourne suburb of Balwyn. Known as the "Tigers", the club fields senior teams in the Eastern Football League which it joined in 2007.

== History ==
Football was played informally in local Balwyn paddocks, until 1910 when Camberwell Council developed farmland which became Balwyn Park. In 1917 the first Balwyn team, believed to be Under 19s entered the Reporter District Football League. Balwyn's senior team, played their first game in May 1922.

In 1926 Balwyn finished runners-up to Auburn in the last year of the Reporter District League, and in 1927 were admitted to the VFL Sub-district Competition.

In 1927 Balwyn defeated Middle Park to win the Club's first premiership.

In the 1932 Balwyn became a founding member of the Eastern Suburban Football League, winning flags in 1933 and 1934.

The Club reformed in 1946 and stayed in the VAFA for ten seasons. During this time they adopted the black and yellow colours. Balwyn left the Amateurs, re-joining the ESFL in 1956.

In 1963 the South East Suburban League was formed with the merger of Caulfield-Oakleigh FL and the Eastern Suburban FL. As foundation members both Balwyn and Burwood had the same strip, the matter was settled by a toss of a coin, which Balwyn won.

For Balwyn success was a long time coming having made and lost two grand finals in the 1970s. In 1989 Balwyn's 55 year premiership drought broke, with a win over Oakleigh Districts. A decade later they won four in a row, they added two more before leaving the SFL at the end of 2006.

Balwyn decided to transfer to what was then the strongest metro competition in Melbourne, the Eastern Football League which it joined in 2007. Next year Daniel Harford led the Tigers to their first EFL flag against Vermont in the 2008 Grand Final.

The Club took back-to-back Senior Division 1 titles in the EFL in 2012 and 2013.

== Premierships ==
- Victorian Football League sub-districts competition: 1927
- Eastern Suburban Football League: 1933, 1934
- South East Suburban Football League: 1989
- Southern Football League: 1997, 1998, 1999, 2000, 2003, 2005
- Eastern Football League: 2008, 2012, 2013, 2015, 2016, 2024

== VFL/ AFL Players ==
- Brian Douge - Hawthorn
- Leigh Montagna - St Kilda
- Luke Power - Brisbane Bears, Greater Western Sydney
- Sam Power - Western Bulldogs, North Melbourne
- Blake Broadhurst, current player
- Mick McGuane, coach of the 1st Div Seniors 2007
