= Eric Sweet =

Australian rules footballer

Personal information
- Full name: Eric Sweet
- Born: 2 March 1918
- Died: 14 December 2005 (aged 87)
- Original team: East Perth (WAFL)
- Height: 179 cm (5 ft 10 in)
- Weight: 67 kg (148 lb)

Playing career^{1}
| Years | Club | Games (Goals) |
| 1941, 1943 | South Melbourne | 4 (2) |
- ^{1} Playing statistics correct to the end of 1943.

Eric Sweet (2 March 1918 – 14 December 2005) was an Australian rules footballer who played with South Melbourne in the Victorian Football League (VFL).

Sweet's brother Jack Sweet also played for South Melbourne.

== Sources ==
- Cullen, B. (2015) Harder than Football, Slattery Media Group, Melbourne. ISBN 9780992379148
