= Jack Sweet =

Australian rules footballer

Personal information
- Full name: Jack Sweet
- Born: 21 December 1919
- Died: 7 September 2006 (aged 86)
- Original team: East Perth (WAFL)
- Height: 6 ft 2 in (188 cm)
- Weight: 11 st 9 lb (74 kg)

Playing career^{1}
Years	Club	Games (Goals)
1939–1941, 1946–1949	East Perth	103 (45)
1943	South Melbourne	6 (0)
1950–1951	Subiaco	41 (5)

Coaching career
Years	Club	Games (W–L–D)
1950–1952	Subiaco	62 (12–50–0)
- ^{1} Playing statistics correct to the end of 1943.

Jack Sweet (21 December 1919 – 7 September 2006) was an Australian rules footballer who played primarily with East Perth in the Western Australian National Football League either side of World War II.

== Career ==
Sweet joined the Royals as a highly prized recruit from Harvey in the South West League in 1939. He took a little time to establish himself in his debut season, but by August his class as a back pocket player had become undoubted. His 1940 season was affected by niggling injuries, and he continued to be so troubled during the 1941 season.

Sweet moved to Melbourne on war duties during August 1941, and was signed by South Melbourne with the expectation of playing the last few games of that season, despite having not played recently for East Perth due to broken ribs. However, Sweet never played for the Swans until 1943, when he would take part in only six games mid-season. Nevertheless, in 1945, when Sweet was stationed in northern Australia but hoping to return south to play some league football, South Melbourne secretary Joe Kelly would describe Sweet as the best footballer he had seen from the West.

Sweet would return to the WANFL in 1946, after having been wounded in July 1945. He would become captain of East Perth that year, but did not regain his postwar effectiveness until moved onto the ball mid-season, and for a time onto the forward line during the following season.

=== Subiaco ===
For the 1950 season, Sweet switched clubs to become captain-coach of Subiaco, whose poor recruitment since the war ended had meant it had won just ten games out of fifty-six between 1947 and 1949. Sweet, who retired as a player after the 1951 season but continued for another year with the Maroons as non-playing coach, was given a free rein to rebuild the club's list and introduced more than fifty new players to league ranks. Nevertheless, the almost complete failure of Subiaco's earlier recruits (Note: Of thirty Subiaco newcomers from those three seasons, only one – Cliff Brown – would play more than two seasons for the club at league level.) alongside the retirement of former mainstays Bill Alderman, Frank Exell, "Bub" Howe and Fred Williams, meant that Subiaco's fortunes did not improve. Under Sweet the Maroons would win only twelve games out of 62 and finish bottom, seventh and seventh in his three seasons.

== Family ==
Sweet's brother Eric also played for South Melbourne.
