= Michael Symons =

Australian rules footballer

Personal information
- Full name: Michael Symons
- Born: 16 September 1971 (age 55)
- Original team: Subiaco (WAFL)
- Draft: 8th overall, 1991, Essendon
- Height: 182 cm (6 ft 0 in)
- Weight: 75 kg (165 lb)
- Positions: Forward, Defender

Playing career^{1}
| Years | Club | Games (Goals) |
| 1992–1999 | Essendon | 109 (80) |
- ^{1} Playing statistics correct to the end of 1999.

Michael Symons (born 16 September 1971) is a former Australian rules footballer who played with Essendon in the Australian Football League (AFL) during the 1990s.

Recruited from Western Australian Football League (WAFL) club Subiaco, Symons was picked up by Essendon with their first pick and the eighth overall in the 1991 AFL draft. Symons, known for his aerial ability, started out as a forward but developed into a half back flanker. He missed out on selection in Essendon's 1993 premiership team, despite playing 19 consecutive games from round four to the semi-final win over West Coast. He kicked 28 goals the following season, with a bag of five in a win over Adelaide and a six-goal haul when Essendon defeated Richmond.

Injuries kept Symons out of action for most of the 1998 season but in 1999 he made 14 appearances, before being omitted for the finals. As a result, he participated in Essendon's reserves premiership win.

After being delisted, the Western Australian State of Origin representative returned to Subiaco in 2000 and took out their 'Club Champion' award as well as finishing runner-up in the Sandover Medal to Richard Ambrose.

== Bibliography ==
- Holmesby, Russell and Main, Jim (2007). The Encyclopedia of AFL Footballers. 7th ed. Melbourne: Bas Publishing.
