= Brian Douge =

Australian rules footballer

Personal information
- Born: 2 March 1951 (age 75)
- Original team: Balwyn
- Height: 182 cm (6 ft 0 in)
- Weight: 80 kg (176 lb)
- Position: Back pocket

Playing career^{1}
Years	Club	Games (Goals)
1969–1976	Hawthorn	91 (8)
1977–1981	Subiaco	81 (23)
Total		172 (31)

Coaching career
Years	Club	Games (W–L–D)
1977–1978	Subiaco (WANFL)	42 (12–30–0)
- ^{1} Playing statistics correct to the end of 1976.

Brian Douge (born 2 March 1951) is a former Australian rules footballer who played with Hawthorn in the Victorian Football League (VFL).

Douge played mostly in the back pocket but never really established himself in the Hawthorn side until the 1973 season. He played in Hawthorn's premiership side in 1976, with the Grand Final against North Melbourne being his last game.

He was captain-coach of Subiaco in 1977 and 1978.
