= Richard Ambrose =

Australian rules footballer

Personal information
- Full name: Richard James Ambrose
- Born: 10 June 1972 (age 54)
- Original team: Wanganui / Shepparton
- Draft: 21st, 1990 AFL draft
- Height: 191 cm (6 ft 3 in)
- Weight: 92 kg (203 lb)

Playing career^{1}
Years	Club	Games (Goals)
1991–1992	Essendon	0 (0)
1993	Sydney Swans	3 (1)
1994–1998	Port Adelaide (SANFL)	52 (29)
1999–2004	Subiaco (WAFL)	113 (88)
Total		168 (118)
- ^{1} Playing statistics correct to the end of 2004.

Richard Ambrose (born 10 June 1972) is a former Australian rules footballer who played with the Sydney Swans in the Australian Football League (AFL). He also played for Port Adelaide in the South Australian National Football League (SANFL) and Subiaco in the West Australian Football League (WAFL).

A key position player, Ambrose started his AFL career at Essendon after being picked up by the club with the 21st selection of the 1990 AFL draft. He was however restricted to the reserves and was unable to break into the seniors over two seasons. He was one of three players that Essendon traded to Sydney at the end of 1992 in return for the 20th draft pick, which was used on Scott Cummings. The others were Ed Considine and Michael Werner.

Ambrose, who hailed from Shepparton, finally made his league debut in 1993 when he was part of the Sydney team which took on the West Coast Eagles at the SCG. He played just two more games for the club, a win over Melbourne and loss to Adelaide, both at home.

Leaving Sydney after just one season, Ambrose arrived at SANFL club Port Adelaide in 1994 and played for five seasons. He was a South Australian interstate representative and participated in finals football every season he was at the club, culminating in a grand final loss in 1997 and a member of Port's 1998 premiership team.

He moved to Subiaco in 1999 and by playing in the WAFL had distinction of being part of clubs from four different states during the 1990s. At this stage the league was named the Westar Rules and he was the competition's best player in 2000 when he won the Sandover Medal as a centre half forward. He polled 34 votes to beat teammate Michael Symons and in doing so became the first ever forward from Subiaco to win the award. Ambrose participated in finals football every season he was at the club, culminating in a grand final loss in 2003 and premiership in 2004. He was a regular Western Australian interstate representative.

Ambrose signed with Corowa-Rutherglen in 2005. He played for the Ovens and Murray Football League club until retiring after the 2008 season, although he made a comeback in 2009 and then again in 2011 with Benalla Football Club. His return to this Goulburn Valley Football Netball League club capped off a senior football career spanning over twenty years including four different decades. He currently resides in Byron Bay with his partner Alice and their young daughter Dorothea.
