= Damian Hampson =

Australian rules footballer

Personal information
- Full name: Damian Hampson
- Born: 27 March 1970 (age 56)
- Original team: Subiaco (WAFL)
- Draft: 7th overall, 1990 AFL draft
- Height: 180 cm (5 ft 11 in)
- Weight: 79 kg (174 lb)

Playing career^{1}
Years	Club	Games (Goals)
1991–1992	Carlton	0 (0)
1993–1994	West Coast Eagles	6 (1)
- ^{1} Playing statistics correct to the end of 1994.

Damian Hampson (born 27 March 1970) is a former Australian rules footballer who played with the West Coast Eagles in the Australian Football League (AFL).

Hampson was a "Best and Fairest" winner at Western Australian Football League (WAFL) club Subiaco in 1990, the club for which his father Reg played 200 WAFL games. He had earlier represented Australia at youth level tennis and competed against the likes of Richard Fromberg and Jason Stoltenberg, taking a set off the latter on a few occasions. As a footballer he was a hard running midfielder and was picked up by Carlton in the first round of the 1990 AFL draft.

After 21 games in the reserves and without making it into the seniors, Hampson was traded to West Coast at the end of the 1992 AFL season. He made four league appearances in 1993 without establishing a permanent place for himself in what was a strong team. Hampson managed to break back into the side late in the 1994 season but lost his spot by the time finals came, with the Eagles claiming their second premiership.
