= Colin Davey =

Australian rules footballer

Personal information
- Full name: Colin Davey
- Born: 4 May 1932
- Died: 9 March 2006 (aged 73)
- Original team: Fairfield
- Height: 180 cm (5 ft 11 in)
- Weight: 78 kg (172 lb)
- Position: Defence

Playing career^{1}
Years	Club	Games (Goals)
1952–59	Fitzroy	77 (9)
- ^{1} Playing statistics correct to the end of 1959.

Colin Davey (4 May 1932 – 9 March 2006) was a former Australian rules footballer who played with Fitzroy in the Victorian Football League (VFL).
