= Tom Outridge Jr. =

Australian cricketer

Tom Outridge
Personal information
- Full name: Thomas Michael Outridge
- Born: 8 September 1927; Perth, Western Australia
- Died: 21 July 2003 (aged 75); Bunbury, Western Australia
- Batting: Left-handed
- Bowling: Slow left-arm orthodox
- Role: All-rounder

Domestic team information
- Years: Team
- 1947/48–1952/53: Western Australia

Career statistics
| Competition | First-class |
|---|---|
| Matches | 19 |
| Runs scored | 724 |
| Batting average | 20.68 |
| 100s/50s | 0/4 |
| Top score | 93 |
| Balls bowled | 1,633 |
| Wickets | 21 |
| Bowling average | 45.57 |
| 5 wickets in innings | 1 |
| 10 wickets in match | 0 |
| Best bowling | 5/78 |
| Catches/stumpings | 8/– |
- Source: CricketArchive, 28 January 2012

Thomas Michael Outridge (8 September 1927 – 21 July 2003) was an Australian cricketer who represented Western Australia in 19 first-class matches between 1948 and 1953. He was a left-handed all-rounder, bowling slow left-arm orthodox spin.

The son of Thomas Outridge, a noted footballer, Outridge played for a state colts team against the Marylebone Cricket Club in October 1946, and made his senior debut the following season. Debuting against the touring Indian team in February 1948, he scored 28 and 14, coming in third in the batting order. Outridge made his Sheffield Shield debut against South Australia in January 1950, scoring 49 runs in the first innings before being run out by John Wilkin. He played his final match in 1953, against the touring South Africans. Outridge's highest score of 92 came against the touring MCC in October 1950, when he hit nine fours and three sixes in his innings. His 19 first-class matches yielded 21 wickets, with a best of 5/78 taken against Victoria in February 1953, in what was his final Shield match. Outridge retired from cricket in November 1953, after he moved to Bunbury to work at his father's hotel, citing difficulties "having to travel 250 miles to play each weekend". He died in Bunbury in 2003, having for several years represented a district team at the annual Country Week competition in Perth.
