= 2008 WAFL season =

Australian rules football season

- Teams: 9
- Premiers: Subiaco; 11th premiership
- Minor premiers: Subiaco; 12th minor premiership
- Sandover Medallist: Hayden Ballantyne (Peel Thunder)
- Bernie Naylor Medallist: Brad Smith (Subiaco)
- Matches played: 94

The 2008 WAFL season was the 124th season of the various incarnations of the West Australian Football League, and was completely dominated by Subiaco, who not only recorded their first hat-trick of premierships but achieved a dominance over the rest of the league unrivalled in a major Australian Rules league since Port Adelaide in the 1914 SAFL season. The Lions lost once to eventual Grand Final opponents Swan Districts by the narrowest possible margin, and were previously generally predicted to achieve an undefeated season, being rarely threatened in their twenty-one victories. They finished seven-and-a-half games clear of second-placed West Perth, and convincingly won the Grand Final after trailing early.

Subiaco’s dominance overshadowed the other eight clubs, where the most notable features were the fall of 2007 finalists Claremont and East Perth to second last and last respectively, and a comeback by East Fremantle who won only two of their first eleven matches but then won eight of their last nine

== Home-and-away season ==
=== Round 1 ===
	Round 1
Thursday, 20 March (7:40 pm)	South Fremantle 12.14 (86)	def. by	Subiaco 19.12 (126)	Fremantle Oval (crowd: 2282)
Saturday, 22 March (2:15 pm)	Perth 18.10 (118)	def.	East Fremantle 10.10 (70)	Lathlain Park (crowd: 1708)
Saturday, 22 March (2:15 pm)	Claremont 12.10 (82)	def.	West Perth 9.14 (68)	Claremont Oval (crowd: 1422)
Saturday, 22 March (6:30 pm)	Peel Thunder 15.11 (101)	def. by	Swan Districts 19.19 (133)	Rushton Park (crowd: 1620)
	Bye; East Perth

=== Round 2 ===
	Round 2
Friday, 28 March (7:00 pm)	Subiaco 18.17 (125)	def.	Claremont 12.10 (82)	Leederville Oval (crowd: 2228)
Saturday, 29 March (2:15 pm)	East Fremantle 8.15 (63)	def. by	South Fremantle 22.10 (142)	East Fremantle Oval (crowd: 1755)
Saturday, 29 March (2:15 pm)	West Perth 12.8 (80)	def. by	East Perth 15.14 (104)	Arena Joondalup (crowd: 2089)
Saturday, 29 March (2:15 pm)	Perth 14.18 (102)	def. by	Peel Thunder 17.11 (113)	Lathlain Park (crowd: 1340)
	Bye; Swan Districts

=== Round 3 ===
	Round 3
Friday, 4 April (6:40 pm)	South Fremantle 21.18 (144)	def.	Peel Thunder 10.14 (74)	Fremantle Oval (crowd: 1729)
Saturday, 5 April (2:15 pm)	Swan Districts 16.17 (113)	def.	Claremont 16.14 (110)	Bassendean Oval (crowd: 1116)
Saturday, 5 April (2:15 pm)	East Perth 12.9 (81)	def. by	Perth 19.13 (127)	Leederville Oval (crowd: 1200)
Sunday, 6 April (2:15 pm)	East Fremantle 12.10 (82)	def. by	Subiaco 15.13 (103)	East Fremantle Oval (crowd: 1717)
	Bye; West Perth

=== Round 4 ===
	Round 4
Saturday, 12 April (2:15 pm)	Subiaco 19.26 (140)	def.	Swan Districts 12.7 (79)	Leederville Oval (crowd: 2460)
Saturday, 12 April (2:15 pm)	South Fremantle 10.10 (70)	def. by	West Perth 14.20 (104)	Fremantle Oval (crowd: 2133)
Saturday, 12 April (2:15 pm)	Peel Thunder 18.7 (115)	def.	East Fremantle 15.24 (114)	Rushton Park (crowd: 1542)
Saturday, 12 April (2:15 pm)	Claremont 20.13 (133)	def.	East Perth 9.6 (60)	Claremont Oval (crowd: 1632)
	Bye; Perth
The Peel versus East Fremantle game produces the greatest deficit in scoring shots by a winning club in WAFL history, beating the previous record by two shots.

=== Round 5 ===
	Round 5
Friday, 18 April (7:30 pm)	West Perth 16.9 (105)	def. by	Swan Districts 16.14 (110)	Arena Joondalup (crowd: 2209)
Saturday, 19 April (2:15 pm)	Perth 6.10 (46)	def. by	Subiaco 16.14 (110)	Lathlain Park (crowd: 2162)
Saturday, 19 April (2:15 pm)	East Perth 9.10 (64)	def. by	South Fremantle 20.8 (128)	Leederville Oval (crowd: 1912)
Saturday, 19 April (5:30 pm)	Peel Thunder 17.16 (118)	def.	Claremont 18.8 (116)	Rushton Park (crowd: 1420)
	Bye; East Fremantle
Peel win another thriller, but this time record their first win scoring fewer goals than their opponents.

=== Round 6 (Anzac Day) ===
	Round 6
Friday, 25 April (2:45 pm)	Swan Districts 22.11 (143)	def.	Perth 15.20 (110)	Bassendean Oval (crowd: 6177)
Saturday, 26 April (2:15 pm)	Subiaco 15.18 (108)	def.	West Perth 5.7 (37)	Leederville Oval (crowd: 2682)
Saturday, 26 April (2:15 pm)	East Fremantle 12.10 (82)	def. by	East Perth 17.12 (114)	East Fremantle Oval (crowd: 1545)
Saturday, 26 April (2:15 pm)	Claremont 17.15 (117)	def. by	South Fremantle 19.11 (125)	Claremont Oval (crowd: 1485)
	Bye; Peel Thunder

=== Round 7 ===
	Round 7
Saturday, 3 May (2:15 pm)	West Perth 16.13 (109)	def.	East Fremantle 14.12 (96)	Arena Joondalup (crowd: 1687)
Saturday, 3 May (2:15 pm)	Subiaco 29.33 (207)	def.	Peel Thunder 7.8 (50)	Kalgoorlie (crowd: 3874)
Saturday, 3 May (2:15 pm)	Perth 26.11 (167)	def.	South Fremantle 15.9 (99)	Lathlain Park (crowd: 1976)
Saturday, 3 May (2:15 pm)	East Perth 11.9 (75)	def. by	Swan Districts 10.18 (78)	Leederville Oval (crowd: 2663)
	Bye; Claremont
Subiaco kick the highest score in their history, beating 32.12 (204) against Perth in 1984.; The Lions kick the most behinds by a team in a game since 1980, and the equal second most on record.

=== Round 8 ===
	Round 8
Saturday, 10 May (2:15 pm)	Swan Districts 11.14 (80)	def. by	East Fremantle 13.15 (93)	Bassendean Oval (crowd: 2541)
Saturday, 10 May (2:15 pm)	Subiaco 20.17 (137)	def.	East Perth 10.5 (65)	Subiaco Oval (crowd: 2457)
Saturday, 10 May (2:15 pm)	Claremont 9.9 (63)	def. by	Perth 11.16 (82)	Claremont Oval (crowd: 1582)
Saturday, 10 May (3:15 pm)	Peel Thunder 12.10 (82)	def. by	West Perth 27.20 (182)	Rushton Park (crowd: 1226)
	Bye; South Fremantle

=== Round 9 ===
	Round 9
Saturday, 17 May (2:15 pm)	South Fremantle 23.16 (154)	def.	Swan Districts 11.9 (75)	Fremantle Oval (crowd: 1802)
Saturday, 17 May (2:15 pm)	Perth 8.17 (65)	drew with	West Perth 9.11 (65)	Lathlain Park (crowd: 2781)
Saturday, 17 May (2:15 pm)	Peel Thunder 15.12 (102)	def.	East Perth 8.10 (58)	Rushton Park (crowd: 1125)
Saturday, 17 May (2:15 pm)	East Fremantle 18.15 (123)	def.	Claremont 16.6 (102)	Geraldton (crowd: 2019)
	Bye; Subiaco
The Lathlain Park match was the first senior WAFL draw in 500 matches since East Perth and Swan Districts drew at Busselton in the opening round of 2003. It was a remarkable result because the colts teams had also drawn earlier in the day.

=== Round 10 ===
	Round 10
Saturday, 24 May (2:15 pm)	West Perth 20.9 (129)	def.	Claremont 14.10 (94)	Arena Joondalup (crowd: 2184)
Saturday, 24 May (2:15 pm)	Swan Districts 17.14 (116)	def.	Peel Thunder 14.10 (94)	Bassendean Oval (crowd: 1874)
Saturday, 24 May (2:15 pm)	Subiaco 22.10 (142)	def.	South Fremantle 11.19 (85)	Leederville Oval (crowd: 1451)
Saturday, 24 May (2:15 pm)	East Fremantle 7.11 (53)	def. by	Perth 16.13 (109)	East Fremantle Oval (crowd: 1360)
	Bye; East Perth

=== Round 11 (Foundation Day) ===
	Round 11
Saturday, 31 May (2:15 pm)	Peel Thunder 9.17 (71)	def. by	Perth 17.12 (114)	Rushton Park (crowd: 874)
Monday, 2 June (2:15 pm)	South Fremantle 18.11 (119)	def.	East Fremantle 14.6 (90)	Fremantle Oval (crowd: 6003)
Monday, 2 June (2:15 pm)	East Perth 4.8 (32)	def. by	West Perth 12.25 (97)	Leederville Oval (crowd: 3864)
Monday, 2 June (2:15 pm)	Claremont 11.11 (77)	def. by	Subiaco 18.20 (128)	Claremont Oval (crowd: 2435)
	Bye; Swan Districts

=== Round 12 ===
	Round 12
Saturday, 14 June (2:15 pm)	Peel Thunder 19.13 (127)	def.	South Fremantle 19.11 (125)	Rushton Park (crowd: 1213)
Saturday, 14 June (2:15 pm)	Perth 10.15 (75)	def. by	East Perth 12.11 (83)	Lathlain Park (crowd: 4178)
Saturday, 14 June (2:15 pm)	Subiaco 24.18 (162)	def.	East Fremantle 11.10 (76)	Leederville Oval (crowd: 1966)
Sunday, 15 June (2:15 pm)	Claremont 10.6 (66)	def. by	Swan Districts 15.7 (97)	Claremont Oval (crowd: 1245)
	Bye; West Perth

=== Round 13 ===
	Round 13
Saturday, 21 June (2:15 pm)	East Fremantle 11.18 (84)	def.	Peel Thunder 4.17 (41)	East Fremantle Oval (crowd: 1127)
Saturday, 21 June (2:15 pm)	East Perth 15.13 (103)	def.	Claremont 14.9 (93)	Leederville Oval (crowd: 1431)
Saturday, 21 June (2:15 pm)	Swan Districts 17.12 (114)	def.	Subiaco 17.11 (113)	Bassendean Oval (crowd: 2607)
Saturday, 21 June (2:15 pm)	West Perth 13.8 (86)	def. by	South Fremantle 18.17 (125)	Arena Joondalup (crowd: 1915)
	Bye; Perth
Swan Districts inflict Subiaco’s sole loss of the season after coming back from a 41-point deficit.; It was Subiaco’s first loss at Bassendean since Round 12, 1997, ending a record run by any club of twelve wins at the venue.

=== Round 14 ===
	Round 14
Saturday, 28 June (2:15 pm)	Claremont 10.16 (76)	def. by	Peel Thunder 16.12 (108)	Claremont Oval (crowd: 1182)
Saturday, 28 June (2:15 pm)	South Fremantle 19.15 (129)	def.	East Perth 7.11 (53)	Fremantle Oval (crowd: 1130)
Saturday, 28 June (2:15 pm)	Subiaco 18.12 (120)	def.	Perth 11.6 (72)	Leederville Oval (crowd: 2137)
Saturday, 28 June (2:15 pm)	Swan Districts 13.10 (88)	def. by	West Perth 14.12 (96)	Bassendean Oval (crowd: 2532)
	Bye; East Fremantle
Claremont record their ninth consecutive defeat, their worst run since 1974-75, as Peel win for the first time at Claremont Oval.

=== Round 15 ===
	Round 15
Saturday, 5 July (2:15 pm)	East Perth 7.10 (52)	def. by	East Fremantle 16.12 (108)	Leederville Oval (crowd: 1339)
Saturday, 5 July (2:15 pm)	Perth 12.14 (86)	def. by	Swan Districts 16.6 (102)	Lathlain Park (crowd: 2282)
Saturday, 5 July (2:15 pm)	South Fremantle 14.4 (88)	def. by	Claremont 14.14 (98)	Fremantle Oval (crowd: 1150)
Saturday, 5 July (2:15 pm)	West Perth 10.6 (66)	def. by	Subiaco 12.12 (84)	Arena Joondalup (crowd: 1524)
	Bye; Peel Thunder

=== Round 16 ===
	Round 16
Friday, 11 July (6:40 pm)	South Fremantle 20.10 (130)	def.	Perth 11.9 (75)	Fremantle Oval (crowd: 2028)
Saturday, 12 July (2:15 pm)	East Fremantle 19.8 (122)	def.	West Perth 10.14 (74)	East Fremantle Oval (crowd: 1436)
Saturday, 12 July (2:15 pm)	Peel Thunder 15.9 (99)	def. by	Subiaco 20.12 (132)	Rushton Park (crowd: 1372)
Saturday, 12 July (2:15 pm)	Swan Districts 13.9 (87)	def. by	East Perth 14.15 (99)	Bassendean Oval (crowd: 3620)
	Bye; Claremont

=== Round 17 ===
	Round 17
Saturday, 19 July (2:15 pm)	East Fremantle 17.13 (115)	def.	Swan Districts 13.13 (91)	East Fremantle Oval (crowd: 1783)
Saturday, 19 July (2:15 pm)	East Perth 7.11 (53)	def. by	Subiaco 20.14 (134)	Leederville Oval (crowd: 1690)
Saturday, 19 July (2:15 pm)	Perth 11.10 (76)	def. by	Claremont 16.13 (109)	Lathlain Park (crowd: 1866)
Saturday, 19 July (2:15 pm)	West Perth 14.18 (102)	def.	Peel Thunder 13.9 (87)	Arena Joondalup (crowd: 1529)
	Bye; South Fremantle

=== Round 18 ===
	Round 18
Saturday, 26 July (2:15 pm)	Peel Thunder 14.12 (96)	def.	Claremont 12.11 (83)	Bunbury (crowd: 1200)
Saturday, 26 July (2:15 pm)	Subiaco 13.18 (96)	def.	South Fremantle 11.7 (73)	Leederville Oval (crowd: 1795)
	Bye; East Fremantle, East Perth, Perth, Swan Districts, West Perth
Peel win from a 48-point half-time deficit, the third most in WAFL history.

=== Round 19 ===
	Round 19
Saturday, 2 August (2:15 pm)	Claremont 19.12 (126)	def.	East Fremantle 9.9 (63)	Claremont Oval (crowd: 1410)
Saturday, 2 August (2:15 pm)	East Perth 16.15 (111)	def.	Peel Thunder 7.8 (50)	Leederville Oval (crowd: 1293)
Saturday, 2 August (2:15 pm)	Swan Districts 11.19 (85)	def. by	South Fremantle 16.10 (106)	Newman (crowd: 3000)
Saturday, 2 August (2:15 pm)	West Perth 16.8 (104)	def.	Perth 14.8 (92)	Arena Joondalup (crowd: 1841)
	Bye; Subiaco

=== Round 20 ===
	Round 20
Saturday, 9 August (2:15 pm)	Claremont 4.12 (36)	def. by	Subiaco 25.17 (167)	Claremont Oval (crowd: 2012)
Saturday, 9 August (2:15 pm)	East Fremantle 16.17 (113)	def.	Perth 8.14 (62)	East Fremantle Oval (crowd: 2081)
Saturday, 9 August (2:15 pm)	South Fremantle 22.13 (145)	def.	East Perth 18.6 (114)	Fremantle Oval (crowd: 1544)
Saturday, 9 August (2:15 pm)	West Perth 18.15 (123)	def.	Swan Districts 18.9 (117)	Arena Joondalup (crowd: 1982)
	Bye; Peel Thunder
Claremont suffer their biggest defeat for fifty years and equal second-biggest on record, Subiaco beat their 1986 record of seventeen wins in a home-and-away season and their 1934 record for biggest win over the Tigers.

=== Round 21 ===
	Round 21
Saturday, 16 August (2:15 pm)	East Fremantle 16.13 (109)	def.	South Fremantle 14.16 (100)	East Fremantle Oval (crowd: 2322)
Saturday, 16 August (2:15 pm)	East Perth 15.11 (101)	def. by	West Perth 18.15 (123)	Leederville Oval (crowd: 2263)
Saturday, 16 August (2:15 pm)	Perth 7.13 (55)	def. by	Peel Thunder 10.13 (73)	Lathlain Park (crowd: 1686)
Saturday, 16 August (2:15 pm)	Swan Districts 9.19 (73)	def. by	Subiaco 17.21 (123)	Bassendean Oval (crowd: 2732)
	Bye; Claremont

=== Round 22 ===
	Round 22
Saturday, 23 August (2:15 pm)	Claremont 10.12 (72)	def. by	West Perth 15.18 (108)	Claremont Oval (crowd: 1480)
Saturday, 23 August (2:15 pm)	Peel Thunder 11.13 (79)	def. by	East Fremantle 17.13 (115)	Rushton Park (crowd: 1559)
Saturday, 23 August (2:15 pm)	Perth 12.10 (82)	def. by	Swan Districts 15.11 (101)	Lathlain Park (crowd: 2297)
Saturday, 23 August (2:15 pm)	Subiaco 20.22 (142)	def.	East Perth 12.8 (80)	Leederville Oval (crowd: 2196)
	Bye; South Fremantle

=== Round 23 ===
	Round 23
Saturday, 30 August (2:15 pm)	East Perth 4.16 (40)	def. by	Perth 12.14 (86)	Leederville Oval (crowd: 1741)
Saturday, 30 August (2:15 pm)	South Fremantle 13.11 (89)	def. by	Claremont 15.10 (100)	Fremantle Oval (crowd: 1758)
Saturday, 30 August (2:15 pm)	Swan Districts 15.11 (101)	def.	Peel Thunder 14.9 (93)	Bassendean Oval (crowd: 2705)
Saturday, 30 August (2:15 pm)	West Perth 15.9 (99)	def. by	East Fremantle 16.8 (104)	Arena Joondalup (crowd: 2011)
	Bye; Subiaco

== Ladder ==
2008 ladder
Pos	Team	Pld	W	L	D	PF	PA	PP	Pts
1	Subiaco (P)	20	19	1	0	2599	1431	181.6	76
2	West Perth	20	11	8	1	1957	1835	106.6	46
3	South Fremantle	20	11	9	0	2262	1965	115.1	44
4	Swan Districts	20	11	9	0	1983	2084	95.2	44
5	East Fremantle	20	10	10	0	1875	1997	93.9	40
6	Peel Thunder	20	8	12	0	1773	2270	78.1	32
7	Perth	20	7	12	1	1801	1843	97.7	30
8	Claremont	20	6	14	0	1835	2066	88.8	24
9	East Perth	20	6	14	0	1542	2136	72.2	24

Source: WAFL Footy Facts
Rules for classification: 1) points; 2) percentage; 3) number of points for.
(P) Premiers

== Finals ==
=== Semi-finals ===
	First semi-final
Saturday, 6 September (2:15 pm)	South Fremantle 11.18 (84)	def. by	Swan Districts 16.12 (108)	Fremantle Oval (crowd: 4,755)

	Second semi-final
Saturday, 6 September (2:15 pm)	Subiaco 17.12 (114)	def.	West Perth 10.10 (70)	Leederville Oval (crowd: 5,163)

=== Preliminary final ===
	Preliminary final
Saturday, 13 September (2:15 pm)	West Perth 14.10 (94)	def. by	Swan Districts 15.14 (104)	Arena Joondalup (crowd: 5,556)

=== Grand Final ===
2008 WAFL Grand Final
Sunday 21 September	Subiaco	def.	Swan Districts	Subiaco Oval (crowd: 23,199)
3.5 (23); 9.9 (63); 15.13 (103); 22.16 (148)	Q1; Q2; Q3; Final	6.3 (39); 9.5 (59); 10.6 (66); 14.7 (91)	Umpires: Gavin Statham, Start Parry, Dean Margetts; Simpson Medal: Chris Hall (Subiaco)
Brad Smith 6, Mapleston 4, Read 3, Cossom 2, Chris Hall 2, Hildebrandt 2, Schofield, Cockie, Hayes	Goals	Notte 2, Roberts 2, Taylor, Michael McInlay, Garlett, Davis, Geappen, Yarran, Pullman, Naitanui, Wolfenden, Banfield
Brad Smith, Mapleston, Read, Hall, Broughton, Schofield, Hildebrandt, Hayes	Best	Roberts, Spaanderman, Wolfenden, Johnson, Notte, Hinkley
