= Wally Steele =

Australian rules footballer

Personal information
- Full name: Walter Colville Steele
- Born: 8 September 1878; Rokewood, Victoria
- Died: 12 September 1941 (aged 63); Camperdown, Victoria
- Original team: Scotch College

Playing career^{1}
Years	Club	Games (Goals)
1897–98	Melbourne	26 (12)
- ^{1} Playing statistics correct to the end of 1898.

Walter Colville Steele (8 September 1878 – 12 September 1941) was an Australian rules footballer who played with Melbourne in the Victorian Football League (VFL).
