= Blake Broadhurst =

Australian rules footballer

Personal information
- Full name: Blake William Broadhurst
- Nicknames: Broady, Boats
- Born: 29 December 1985 (age 40)
- Original team: Warwick Greenwood JFC
- Height: 190 cm (6 ft 3 in)
- Weight: 85 kg (187 lb)
- Position: Full-forward

Club information
- Current club: Balwyn Football Club

Playing career^{1}
Years	Club	Games (Goals)
2004–2012	Subiaco	141 (318)
2013–	Balwyn	54 (140)
- ^{1} Playing statistics correct to the end of 2016.

Career highlights
- Subiaco leading goalkicker 2010, 2011, 2012; Bernie Naylor Medal winner 2011

Blake William Broadhurst (born 29 December 1985) is an Australian rules footballer who formerly played for Subiaco Football Club in the West Australian Football League (WAFL). In 2010, 2011 and 2012 he was the club's leading goalkicker. In 2011 he won the Bernie Naylor Medal for the most goals at the end of the home and away season in the WAFL with a tally of 68.

In 2013, Broadhurst signed with the Balwyn Football Club in the Eastern Football League, based in the eastern suburbs of Melbourne.
