= Kyal Horsley =

Australian rules footballer (born 1987)

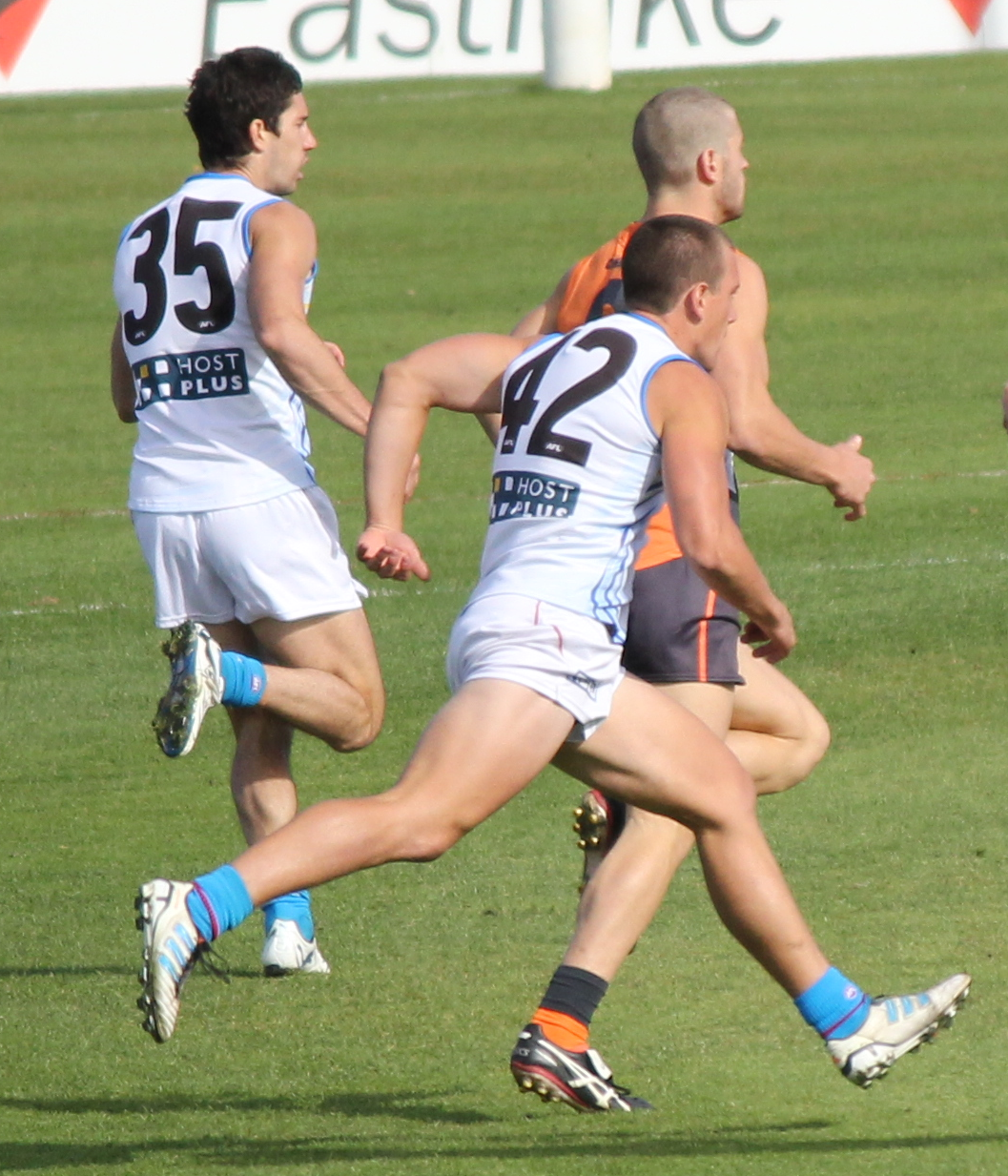
- Horsley (42) in May 2012

Personal information
- Full name: Kyal Horsley
- Born: 2 September 1987 (age 39); Kalgoorlie, Western Australia
- Original team: Kalgoorlie City (GFL)
- Draft: 2nd pick, 2012 Rookie draft (Gold Coast)
- Height: 182 cm (6 ft 0 in)
- Weight: 88 kg (194 lb)
- Position: Midfielder

Playing career
Years	Club	Games (Goals)
2007–2011 2014–2020	Subiaco (WAFL)	207 (116)
2012–2013	Gold Coast	14 (3)

Representative team honours
Years	Team	Games (Goals)
2008–2010	Western Australia	2 (0)

Career highlights
- Subiaco Rising Star 2008; Football Budget Best First Year Player 2008; Runner-up Sandover Medal 2011, 2018, 2019; Subiaco best and fairest 2011; 3x WAFL Premiership captain: 2014, 2015, 2018; Simpson Medal 2018

Kyal Horsley (born 2 September 1987) is an Australian rules footballer who formerly played for the Gold Coast Football Club in the Australian Football League (AFL). Originally from Kalgoorlie, Western Australia, he previously also played with the Kalgoorlie City Football Club in the Goldfields Football League (GFL) and the Subiaco Football Club in the West Australian Football League (WAFL), where he finished runner-up in the 2011 Sandover Medal to Luke Blackwell. Horsley was drafted by Gold Coast with the second pick in the 2012 Rookie draft, and made his debut for the club in round five of the 2012 season. He was delisted by the club at the end of the 2013 season, after 14 games. Horsley returned to the Subiaco Football Club in 2014 to captain the WAFL side for the 2014 season. Horsley had a powerful return to the WAFL finishing third in the Sandover Medal count after leading the Lions to their 12th premiership.

== Football career ==
Horsley was born and raised in Kalgoorlie, in the Goldfields region of Western Australia. He excelled in a number of sports at junior level, playing A-grade field hockey and cricket, representing Western Australia at hockey at under-15 and under-16 level. Horsley made his debut for the Kalgoorlie City Football Club in 2003, at the age of 16, and won the Mitchell Medal as the best player in the Goldfields Football League (GFL) in 2006. Despite wishing to remain in Kalgoorlie, he was recruited to the Subiaco Football Club in the West Australian Football League (WAFL) in 2007. Horsley made his debut against East Fremantle in round 16 of the 2007 season, kicking two goals and recording 21 disposals, and played a total of 10 reserves games and seven senior games during the season. The following season, he played 21 games mainly as an inside midfielder, winning the Football Budget's award for the Best First Year Player, and tying with Adam Cockie for Subiaco's Rookie of the Year award. Horsley made his state debut for Western Australia in 2008 against Queensland in Townsville, and also played in the interstate game in 2010. In 2011, he played 23 games, including the grand final loss to Claremont, and won the Tom Outridge Medal as Subiaco's best and fairest player, as well as finishing runner-up in the Sandover Medal to Luke Blackwell as the best player in the league.

Speculated as a likely selection in either the 2011 National draft or the 2012 Rookie draft, Horsley was eventually taken by Gold Coast with the second pick in the Rookie Draft. He had previously been invited to train with Fremantle, prior to the start of the 2008 season, but was not drafted. Horsley spent the first few rounds of the season with Gold Coast's reserves team in the North East Australian Football League (NEAFL), but was elevated from the rookie list to the senior list after Jarrod Harbrow received a long-term injury. He made his debut the following week against North Melbourne at Docklands Stadium, replacing the injured Gary Ablett, and recorded 19 disposals and eight tackles. Overall, Horsley played 13 games in his first year, and was considered one of the club's better players throughout the latter half of the season, with The Gold Coast Bulletin noting that he provided "that dash of maturity so needed in a young club". At the club's Club Champion Awards held at the end of the season, Horsley received both the "Most Professional" award and the "Iron Man" award. He was upgraded to Gold Coast's senior list for the 2013 season in October 2012, during the 2012–13 off-season. Horsley played only senior game during the 2013 season, after rupturing his anterior cruciate ligament (ACL) midway through the season. He was delisted by the Suns at the end of the season, and returned to Perth at the end of the season.

Horsley returned to the WAFL with the Subiaco Football Club where he was announced captain in the pre-season. Horsley recovered from his anterior cruciate ligament injury for Round Four against Peel; kicking the first goal in a 17-point win over the Thunder. He amassed 499 disposals from 19 games on the season as well as leading Subiaco to their 12th WAFL premiership over the East Perth Royals.
