= Brad Smith (footballer, born 1979) =

Australian rules footballer, born 1979

Personal information
- Full name: Bradley Phillip Smith
- Born: 11 May 1979 (age 47); Perth, Western Australia
- Original team: Carine JFC
- Draft: No. 57, 2004 National Draft, West Coast
- Height: 193 cm (6 ft 4 in)
- Weight: 102 kg (225 lb)
- Position: Full-forward

Playing career^{1}
| Years | Club | Games (Goals) |
| 1998–2004; 2007–09 | Subiaco | 140 (530) |
| 2005–06 | West Coast | 0 (0) |
- ^{1} Playing statistics correct to the end of 2009.

Career highlights
- Subiaco leading goalkicker 2000, 2003, 2004, 2007, 2008; Bernie Naylor Medal 2003, 2004, 2007, 2008; Subiaco premiership side 2004, 2007, 2008; Simpson Medal 2008 (Grand Final); Subiaco co-captain 2009

Bradley Phillip Smith (born 11 May 1979) is a former Australian rules footballer, who played for Subiaco in the West Australian Football League (WAFL) from 1998–2009. He was also listed with the West Coast Eagles in the Australian Football League (AFL) from 2005–06, but was not able to play a single game for the club due to two knee reconstructions.

== Early career ==
Smith is the son of former Geelong and West Perth forward Phil Smith. He considered nominating for the 1997 AFL draft, but other interests put his AFL career on hold. Over time he began to re-emerge as a solid tall forward playing for Subiaco in the WAFL, kicking 109 goals in 2004, winning the Bernie Naylor Medal for leading goalkicker.

== West Coast Eagles ==
He was drafted by the West Coast Eagles at pick 57 in the 2004 AFL draft.

Smith was considered a key prospect for the full forward position, due to the West Coast Eagles’ lack of quality key position forwards.

=== Knee problems ===
Early in 2005 he suffered a severe knee injury during a pre-season practice match. He required a knee reconstruction, an injury which sidelined him for the 2005 season.

His bad luck continued, and in the 2006 pre-season he injured the same knee during a routine training drill. This injury required yet another reconstruction, ruling him out for the entire 2006 season.

== Return to WAFL ==
He was delisted by the West Coast Eagles at the end of the 2006 season and returned to Subiaco, where he kicked more goals in a WAFL season than any player since Warren Ralph in 1983.

He finished off the 2008 season with 110 goals and another premiership.

Smith retired after the 2009 season.

He currently works in player recruitment at the West Coast Eagles.
