= Tarnica Golisano =

Australian rules footballer

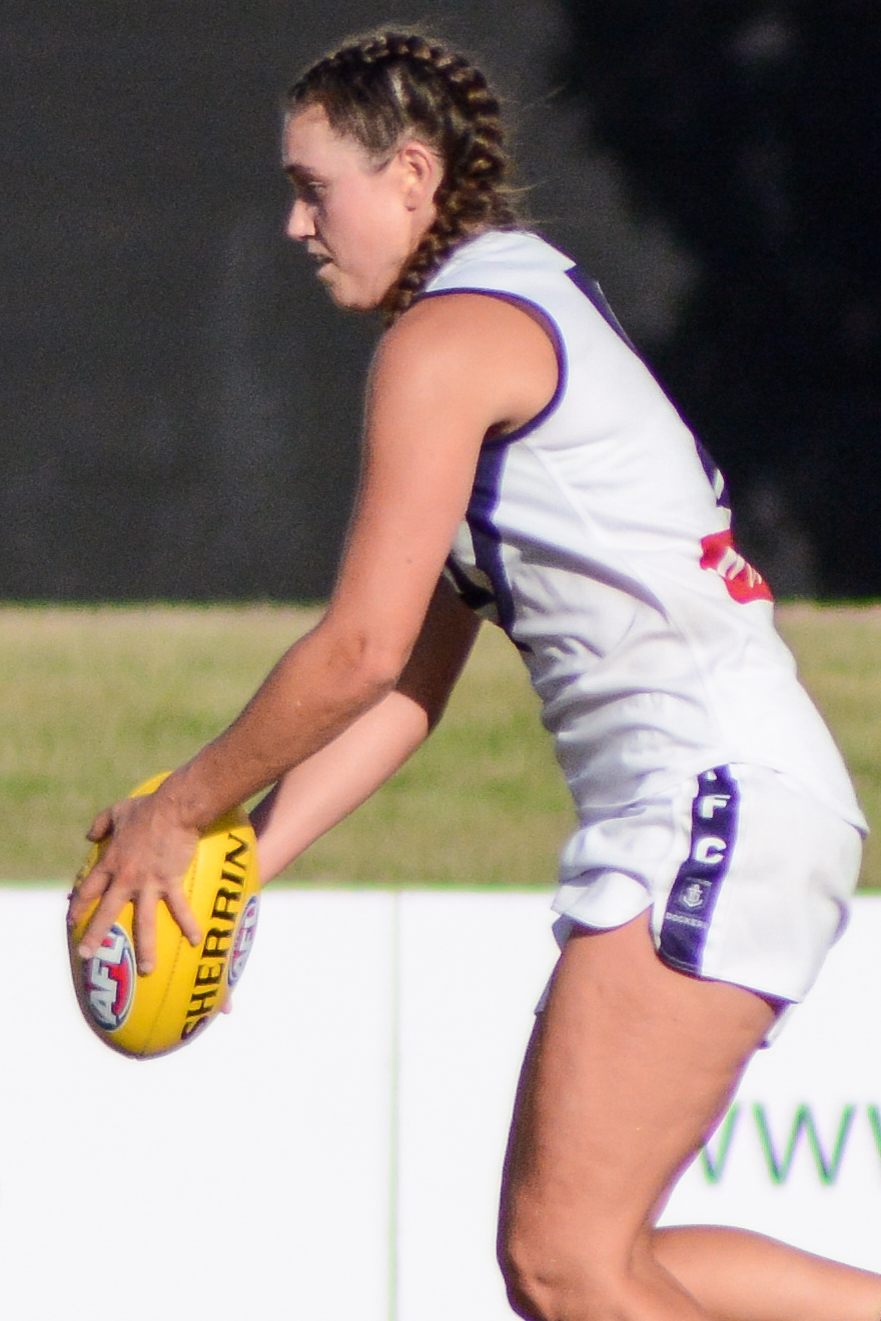
- Golisano in January 2017

Personal information
- Born: 21 September 1996 (age 30)
- Original team: Coastal Titans (WAWFL)
- Draft: 2016 free agent: Fremantle
- Debut: Round 1, 2017, Fremantle vs. Western Bulldogs, at VU Whitten Oval
- Height: 171 cm (5 ft 7 in)
- Position: Defender

Playing career^{1}
Years	Club	Games (Goals)
2017	Fremantle	4 (0)
- ^{1} Playing statistics correct to the end of 2017.

Tarnica Golisano (born 21 September 1996) is an Australian rules footballer who played for the Fremantle Football Club in the AFL Women's competition. Golisano was recruited by Fremantle as a free agent in October 2016. She made her debut in the thirty-two point loss to the Western Bulldogs at VU Whitten Oval in the opening round of the 2017 season. She struggled to maintain a spot in the best 23 players and finished the season with four matches, before being delisted at the end of the 2017 season. Golisano is a qualified personal trainer/gym instructor.
