= Bonny Campbell =

Australian rules footballer

Personal information
- Full name: Hugh Campbell
- Born: 1 March 1898
- Died: 28 April 1987 (aged 89)

Playing career^{1}
Years	Club	Games (Goals)
1915	North Fremantle	12 (1)
1916–1922	South Fremantle	88 (271)
1924–1928	East Perth	88 (358)
Total		188 (630)

Representative team honours
Years	Team	Games (Goals)
1921-1928	Western Australia	15 (86)
- ^{1} Playing statistics correct to the end of 1928.

Hugh "Bonny" Campbell (1 March 1898 – 28 April 1987) was an Australian rules footballer who played 188 West Australian Football League (WAFL) games and kicked 630 goals. He was a star full forward in the WAFL, a regular West Australian interstate representative, and famously for kicked 23 goals in a game for Western Australia against Queensland at the 1924 Hobart Carnival.

== Football ==
Campbell played school football for Kingston ex-Scholars in the North Fremantle area. After playing for Kingston in a curtain raiser to a 1915 WAFL match between North Fremantle and South Fremantle, he offered to back up and play the senior game for North Fremantle, which was one man short. He played with North Fremantle for much of the rest of the season, after which the club folded.

Playing as a half back flanker he helped South Fremantle to win back to back premierships in 1916 and 1917.

A few years later, South Fremantle lost its regular full-forward to injury, and Campbell was asked to fill in. He was so successful in his new position that he remained there permanently. By 1921, he was the regular state full-forward, a position he retained until his retirement. For the 1922 season, Campbell was named captain of South Fremantle, and finished the season as the WAFL's leading goalkicker for the first time.

=== East Perth ===
In 1923, Campbell sought a clearance to four-time defending premiers East Perth, but South Fremantle refused to clear him. East Perth had secured employment for Campbell in the city, which was a means sometimes used to entice players to switch clubs without technically breaking the league's rules against amateurism; but South nevertheless refused the clearance, and the league's Protests and Disputes Board upheld South's position. As a result, he sat out of the 1923 season.

Campbell was finally cleared to East Perth prior to the 1924 season, and immediately resumed his position as the league's foremost goalkicker. He set a new record for most goals in a WAFL premiership season, finishing with 67, in addition to a record-setting 51 goals in five matches for Western Australia (see below).

Campbell topped the goalkicking again in 1926, finishing with a then-national record of 89 goals in a premiership season, then won the goalkicking again in 1927 with 87. He was also part of East Perth's premiership winning teams in both 1926 and 1927. Shortly before the 1929 season was due to open, Campbell announced unexpectedly that he would be retiring.

Campbell had a reputation as a supremely accurate set shot as the major contribution to his success. Unlike most successful full forwards who preceded him, Campbell favoured drop kicks or punt kicks over place kicks, and future scribes ascribed the death of the place kick in Western Australia at least in part to Campbell's successes. He also had a reputation as a good mark, and a clean and unselfish player.

=== Western Australia ===
Campbell represented his state fifteen times throughout his career. He was best remembered for his record-breaking performance in at 1924 Hobart Carnival match against minnows Queensland, in which he scored 23 goals (out of Western Australia's record score of 43.19) despite heavy rain, including ten in the third quarter alone. The performance matched South Australian Bos Daly's 1893 record of 23 goals in a top level state or interstate match, and – if George Gough's 25 goals in a 1924 Victorian Football Association match are excluded due to that league's second tier status at that time – remains the record as of 2020. Across the five matches of the carnival, Campbell kicked a record 51 goals, with hauls of 10 against New South Wales, 8 against Victoria, 7 against Tasmania and 3 against South Australia.

== See also ==
- 1927 Melbourne Carnival
