= Pat Rodriguez =

Personal information
- Full name: Richard Patrick Gerald Rodriguez
- Born: 16 May 1900
- Died: 2 February 1964 (aged 63)
- Position: Rover

Playing career^{1}
Years	Club	Games (Goals)
1916	West Perth	?? (??)
1918–22; 1924–27	Subiaco	105 (??)

Coaching career
Years	Club	Games (W–L–D)
1934	Claremont-Cottesloe	21 (2–19–0)
- ^{1} Playing statistics correct to the end of 1927.

Career highlights
- WAFL leading goalkicker 1920; Subiaco premiership side 1924

Richard Patrick Gerald Rodriguez (16 March 1900 – 2 February 1964) was an Australian rules footballer who played for the West Perth Football Club and Subiaco Football Club in the West Australian Football League (WAFL), he was also a long serving administrator in the WAFL.

== Football career ==
Rodriguez played an unknown number of games for West Perth in 1916. He was a prominent player with Subiaco, playing 160 games. He was the WAFL's leading goalkicker in 1920, and played in the Subiaco 1924 premiership team.

He began his administrative career as a delegate for Claremont in 1927. He served as a WAFL vice-president from 1933 until 1941, and then again from (1949–1950). He was elected president of the WAFL in 1951, and was elected president of the Australian National Football Council in 1956. He served in both roles until his death in 1964.

Rodriguez was inducted to the Australian Football Hall of Fame as an administrator in 1996.

== Outside football ==
Outside football, Rodriguez was a prominent lawyer in Perth, serving as city coroner and as a police court magistrate during his career. He served in the navy during World War II, reaching the rank of lieutenant-commander.
