= Tom Outridge Sr. =

Australian rules footballer and administrator

Tom Outridge
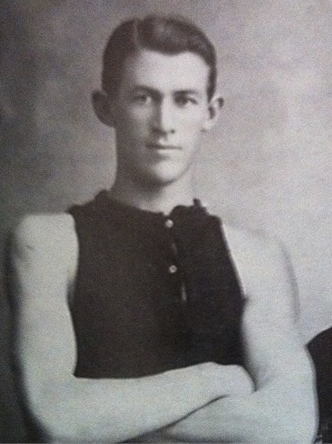

Personal information
- Full name: Thomas Outridge
- Born: 20 September 1898; Ballarat East, Victoria
- Died: 27 September 1973 (aged 75); Perth, Western Australia
- Original team: Coolgardie H-Company Cadets (GCA)
- Height: 6 ft 0.5 in (184 cm)
- Weight: 190 lb (86 kg)
- Position: Ruckman

Playing career^{1}
Years	Club	Games (Goals)
unknown	Mines Rovers	unknown
1916–18	Perth	33 (0)
1919–31	Subiaco	168 (87)
Total		201 (87)

Representative team honours
Years	Team	Games (Goals)
1921–30	Western Australia	25 (36)
- ^{1} Playing statistics correct to the end of 1931.

Career highlights
- Mines Rovers premiership side 1915; Subiaco captain 1920, 1927, 1929; Sandover Medal 1921; Subiaco best and fairest 1921, 1922; Subiaco premiership side 1924; Western Australia captain 1930; Subiaco life member (1935); West Australian Football League life member (1956); West Australian Football Hall of Fame (2004); Subiaco Team of the Century (2008)

Thomas Outridge (20 September 1898 – 27 September 1973) was an Australian rules football player and administrator. Originally from Ballarat, Victoria, he played 201 games for Perth and Subiaco in the West Australian Football League (WAFL), and also represented Western Australia in 25 interstate matches, captaining the side at the 1930 Australian National Football Carnival. Outridge was also the winner of the inaugural Sandover Medal, in 1921.

After his retirement, he served as secretary and later president of the Subiaco Football Club, and also as a commentator. In 2004, Outridge was inducted into the West Australian Football Hall of Fame.

== Football career ==
Outridge was born in Ballarat East, Victoria, to Henry Joseph and Hannah Elizabeth (née Rutherford) Outridge. His father had played for both Ballarat Imperials and South Ballarat in the Ballarat Football League, captaining the latter side. He and his family moved to Eastern Goldfields of Western Australia in 1903, living first in Coolgardie, and then in Kunanalling, where his father opened a mine, the Shamrock.

Outridge began playing football for the Coolgardie H-Company Cadets in the Goldfields Cadets Association. In 1914, he progressed to the Mines Rovers Football Club in the senior Goldfields Football League (GFL), and played in the club's 1915 premiership win over Boulder City. After two seasons playing in Coolgardie, he was recruited by the Perth Football Club in the West Australian Football League (WAFL) in Perth. In 1919, after three seasons and 33 games with the club, Outridge received a transfer to Subiaco at the urging of Eddie du Feu, a Subiaco player.

Playing mainly as a ruckman, Outridge excelled with Subiaco. He served as captain of the club in 1920, and the following season won both Subiaco's best and fairest award and the inaugural Sandover Medal, awarded to the best player in the WAFL. He had tied for the Sandover Medal with Cyril Hoft of Perth, but was awarded the medal on the casting votes of the league's president. Outridge made his debut for Western Australia at the 1921 Australasian Football Carnival, held in Perth, and was widely considered one of Western Australia's best players at the Carnival. Outridge went on to represent Western Australia in three more carnivals: the 1924 Australian Football Carnival held in Hobart, the 1927 Australian Football Carnival held in Melbourne, and the 1930 Australian National Football Carnival held in Adelaide. Overall, Outridge played 25 games for Western Australia in carnival and interstate matches, kicking 36 goals.

In 1930, Outridge was chosen as captain for the 1930 Australian National Football Carnival held in Adelaide. The West Australian reported: "the fact that he was chosen in that capacity after such a long career as a follower was tribute to his ability, and he proved in Adelaide that he could rise to the occasion". Outridge badly injured a leg in a match against Victoria, and was unable to play again in the carnival. In April 1931, it was reported that Outridge had decided to retire, however, he returned to play several games for Subiaco in June. While not playing in the senior team, Outridge represented the Subiaco side in the West Australian National Football Association (WANFA), which acted as a second-tier competition for the WANFL. A bout of appendicitis in October of the same year forced Outridge to miss the 1931 WANFA Grand Final, in which Subiaco defeated Midland-Guildford by 25 points.

== Post-playing career ==
After his retirement from playing, Outridge was employed by Alfred Sandover's sporting goods company, Harris, Scarfe and Sandover's, along with Allan Evans, whom he had previously played with at Perth. Outridge also served as a commentator for WANFL matches on the radio, as well occupying the roles of secretary (from 1935 to 1940) and later president (in the 1941 season) of the Subiaco Football Club. He was made a life member of the club in 1935, and a life member of the league in 1956. In 1944, Outridge served as a goal umpire for a football match between two Royal Australian Air Force (RAAF) units at Kalgoorlie. He later bought a hotel in Bunbury, which he worked at until his retirement. Outridge died in 1973 in Perth.

== Honoured ==
The Tom Outridge Medal is awarded each season to the Subiaco Football Club's best and fairest player.

A street in Subiaco, Outridge Crescent, is named after him.

In 2004, Cazaly Resources, an Australian gold exploration company, named a discovery near Kunanalling "Outridge Prospect" after him.

One of his sons, Thomas Michael Outridge Jr., played cricket for Western Australia.

He was posthumously inducted into the West Australian Football Hall of Fame in 2004, and was named in a forward pocket in Subiaco's Team of the Century in 2008.

== See also ==
- 1927 Melbourne Carnival
