= 1945 WANFL season =

Australian rules football season

- Teams: 8
- Premiers: East Fremantle; 20th premiership
- Minor premiers: East Fremantle; 25th minor premiership
- Sandover Medallist: George Bailey (Perth)
- Leading goalkicker: Bill Baker (West Perth)
- Matches played: 84

The 1945 WANFL season was the 61st season of the various incarnations of the Western Australian National Football League.

During the 1944 season, participation had been restricted to players under nineteen as of 1 October 1944. After the season, it was clear to the WANFL that changes had to be made to this underage restriction, since the Over-Age Footballers Association, the Metal Trades Association and services competitions were developing a good standard from players who were too old to play league football. In October 1944, the WANFL agreed to raise the limit to 25 years of age as of 31 December 1945, but this move proved ill-received and on 29 March the League decided to abolish age restrictions altogether, returning thereby to open-age competition. There was concern that the erratic availability of players who were still in the services would cause difficulties, which meant that the seconds competition, which had been disbanded after 1940, was not resumed.

Numerous famous players of the era – amongst them Merv McIntosh and Bernie Naylor – remained entirely unavailable due to war service, and all clubs had to make constant changes to their lineups. It was generally thought that the 1945 teams would largely be composed of under-age players from 1944, but this proved not to be the case as most either joined the military or proved uncompetitive in senior competition. East Perth, whose unbeaten under-age team of 1944 retained many more of its players than any other club, found the going very tough in open competition and fell to sixth. Owing to the return of numerous top players from its 1941 team, including “Scranno” Jenkins, "Corp" Reilly, Alby Higham and Harry Carbon, South Fremantle, whose restricted-age team had at the close of 1944 lost 24 consecutive matches by an average of ninety-six points, recovered in remarkable fashion to reach the Grand Final.

Claremont were forced to play home games at Subiaco and the W.A.C.A. due to the 1944 Claremont Oval fire and the Claremont Showground, which would ordinarily have become an alternative Tiger home venue, being itself burned in a separate fire during January 1945. The Tigers finished last by six games, and would apart from a surprising narrow fourth position in 1952 remain perennial tailenders until Jim Conway took them from last to first in 1964, winning only 116 of 386 matches for a success rate of 30.05 percent. East Fremantle and West Perth, who contested the previous open-age Grand Final, against set the pace, but Old Easts dominated the latter part of the season and won the premiership.

A new innovation was the Simpson Medal, the first award in Australian sport for the best player in a Grand Final.

== Home-and-away season ==
=== Round 1 ===
	Round 1
Saturday, 5 May (2:45 pm)	East Fremantle 16.20 (116)	def.	Subiaco 3.17 (35)	Fremantle Oval
Saturday, 5 May (2:45 pm)	Claremont 11.13 (79)	def. by	Perth 12.10 (82)	Subiaco Oval
Saturday, 5 May (2:45 pm)	East Perth 9.8 (62)	def. by	Swan Districts 10.12 (72)	Perth Oval
Saturday, 5 May (2:45 pm)	West Perth 12.12 (84)	def.	South Fremantle 12.9 (81)	Leederville Oval
Good crowds attended the first open-age football for four seasons, which caused difficulties at Leederville Oval where only a single turnstile was available.; Steve Marsh kicked five goals for South Fremantle on debut.

=== Round 2 ===
	Round 2
Saturday, 12 May (2:45 pm)	South Fremantle 18.19 (127)	def.	East Perth 13.12 (90)	Fremantle Oval
Saturday, 12 May (2:45 pm)	Swan Districts 15.13 (103)	def. by	West Perth 18.18 (126)	Bassendean Oval (crowd: 4009)
Saturday, 12 May (2:45 pm)	Perth 12.10 (82)	def. by	Subiaco 13.13 (91)	WACA
Saturday, 12 May (2:45 pm)	Claremont 10.12 (72)	def. by	East Fremantle 20.14 (134)	Subiaco Oval
South Fremantle broke a 24-match losing streak with its first win since 1943. Returning forward Alby Higham kicked seven goals in the win.

=== Round 3 ===
	Round 3
Saturday, 19 May (2:45 pm)	Swan Districts 11.10 (76)	def. by	South Fremantle 13.11 (89)	Bassendean Oval
Saturday, 19 May (2:45 pm)	West Perth 14.16 (100)	def. by	East Perth 17.8 (110)	Leederville Oval
Saturday, 19 May (2:45 pm)	Claremont 16.15 (111)	def. by	Subiaco 17.17 (119)	Subiaco Oval
Saturday, 19 May (2:45 pm)	East Fremantle 20.17 (137)	def.	Perth 14.14 (98)	Fremantle Oval
Allan Wilkinson, who had been playing for West Adelaide in previous weeks, kicked nine goals for Subiaco, but he was soon to be forced out of the game after suffering a serious knee problem and being unable to afford surgery.

=== Round 4 ===
	Round 4
Saturday, 26 May (2:45 pm)	Subiaco 11.21 (87)	def. by	West Perth 13.10 (88)	Subiaco Oval
Saturday, 26 May (2:45 pm)	Perth 15.11 (101)	def.	Swan Districts 14.13 (97)	WACA
Saturday, 26 May (2:45 pm)	East Perth 13.16 (94)	def. by	Claremont 17.14 (116)	Perth Oval
Saturday, 26 May (2:45 pm)	East Fremantle 18.14 (122)	def.	South Fremantle 13.13 (91)	Fremantle Oval

=== Round 5 ===
	Round 5
Saturday, 2 June (2:45 pm)	Subiaco 13.13 (91)	def.	South Fremantle 8.14 (62)	Subiaco Oval
Saturday, 2 June (2:45 pm)	Perth 21.8 (134)	def.	East Perth 14.10 (94)	WACA
Saturday, 2 June (2:45 pm)	Swan Districts 16.16 (112)	def.	Claremont 13.11 (89)	Bassendean Oval
Saturday, 2 June (2:45 pm)	West Perth 16.9 (105)	def.	East Fremantle 14.14 (98)	Leederville Oval

=== Round 6 ===
	Round 6
Saturday, 9 June (2:45 pm)	Perth 9.12 (66)	def.	South Fremantle 6.6 (42)	WACA
Saturday, 9 June (2:45 pm)	East Perth 8.8 (56)	def.	Subiaco 3.6 (24)	Perth Oval
Saturday, 9 June (2:45 pm)	Claremont 4.11 (35)	def. by	West Perth 13.12 (90)	Subiaco Oval
Saturday, 9 June (2:45 pm)	East Fremantle 7.16 (58)	def. by	Swan Districts 11.15 (81)	Fremantle Oval
On Perth’s wettest football day on record with 3.06 inches (77.7 mm) East Perth defeated Subiaco despite kicking no goals in the second and third quarters. Subiaco’s score of 3.6 (24) was its lowest since 1922.

=== Round 7 ===
	Round 7
Saturday, 16 June (2:45 pm)	Subiaco 11.11 (77)	def.	Swan Districts 6.10 (46)	Subiaco Oval
Saturday, 16 June (2:45 pm)	West Perth 9.16 (70)	def.	Perth 6.17 (53)	Leederville Oval
Saturday, 16 June (2:45 pm)	South Fremantle 12.14 (86)	def.	Claremont 10.15 (75)	Fremantle Oval
Saturday, 16 June (2:45 pm)	East Perth 10.3 (63)	def. by	East Fremantle 11.10 (76)	Perth Oval

=== Round 8 ===
	Round 8
Saturday, 23 June (2:45 pm)	South Fremantle 17.17 (119)	def.	West Perth 14.14 (98)	Fremantle Oval
Saturday, 23 June (2:45 pm)	East Perth 7.11 (53)	def.	Swan Districts 5.19 (49)	Bassendean Oval
Saturday, 23 June (2:45 pm)	Perth 7.9 (51)	def. by	Claremont 11.11 (77)	Leederville Oval
Saturday, 23 June (2:45 pm)	Subiaco 7.14 (56)	def. by	East Fremantle 11.13 (79)	Subiaco Oval
Record rainfall in Perth of 15.15 inches (384.7 mm) over thirteen days ending 22 June led to the Perth v Claremont match being transferred due to flooding of the WACA. It is the only such transfer due to a flooded ground in WA(N)FL history.

=== Round 9 ===
	Round 9
Saturday, 30 June (2:45 pm)	West Perth 23.14 (152)	def.	Swan Districts 11.16 (82)	Leederville Oval
Saturday, 30 June (2:45 pm)	East Perth 19.16 (130)	def.	South Fremantle 7.18 (60)	Perth Oval
Saturday, 30 June (2:45 pm)	Subiaco 12.9 (81)	def.	Perth 9.6 (60)	Subiaco Oval
Saturday, 30 June (2:45 pm)	East Fremantle 15.17 (107)	def.	Claremont 7.3 (45)	Fremantle Oval (crowd: 2604)
East Perth take the last place in the top four with a fine win led by a 9.8 (62) to 0.2 (2) second quarter with captain-coach Cecil Rowland scoring their first six goals and eight overall.

=== Round 10 ===
	Round 10
Saturday, 7 July (2:45 pm)	South Fremantle 10.26 (86)	def.	Swan Districts 11.14 (80)	Fremantle Oval
Saturday, 7 July (2:45 pm)	East Perth 7.13 (55)	def. by	West Perth 10.11 (71)	Perth Oval
Saturday, 7 July (2:45 pm)	Subiaco 19.11 (125)	def.	Claremont 5.6 (36)	Subiaco Oval
Saturday, 7 July (2:45 pm)	Perth 7.5 (47)	def. by	East Fremantle 18.18 (126)	WACA
Following the match between traditional rivals West Perth and East Perth, a mob of around fifty spectators made a hostile attack upon field umpire Mosey, following him until he dispersed some distance down Bulwer Street.

=== Round 11 ===
	Round 11
Saturday, 14 July (2:45 pm)	West Perth 19.14 (128)	def.	Subiaco 19.5 (119)	Leederville Oval
Saturday, 14 July (2:45 pm)	Swan Districts 12.19 (91)	def.	Perth 11.6 (72)	Bassendean Oval
Saturday, 14 July (2:45 pm)	Claremont 9.13 (67)	def. by	East Perth 12.12 (84)	Subiaco Oval
Saturday, 14 July (2:45 pm)	East Fremantle 15.12 (102)	def. by	South Fremantle 16.14 (110)	Fremantle Oval

=== Round 12 ===
	Round 12
Saturday, 21 July (2:45 pm)	South Fremantle 15.15 (105)	def.	Subiaco 7.7 (49)	Fremantle Oval
Saturday, 21 July (2:45 pm)	East Perth 11.11 (77)	def.	Perth 7.18 (60)	Perth Oval
Saturday, 21 July (2:45 pm)	Claremont 9.4 (58)	def. by	Swan Districts 17.9 (111)	WACA
Saturday, 21 July (2:45 pm)	East Fremantle 7.14 (56)	def. by	West Perth 8.13 (61)	Subiaco Oval
Prior to the round, South Fremantle won an appeal regarding the residential eligibility of Harry Carbon, who before the war had been residentially tied to East Fremantle, but had since moved into South Fremantle's territory.

=== Round 13 ===
	Round 13
Saturday, 28 July (2:45 pm)	South Fremantle 10.8 (68)	def.	Perth 7.14 (56)	Fremantle Oval
Saturday, 28 July (2:45 pm)	Subiaco 5.7 (37)	def. by	East Perth 9.5 (59)	Subiaco Oval
Saturday, 28 July (2:45 pm)	West Perth 16.13 (109)	def.	Claremont 3.11 (29)	Leederville Oval
Saturday, 28 July (2:45 pm)	Swan Districts 14.13 (97)	def. by	East Fremantle 15.10 (100)	Bassendean Oval

=== Round 14 ===
	Round 14
Saturday, 4 August (2:45 pm)	Swan Districts 11.19 (85)	def.	Subiaco 7.10 (52)	Bassendean Oval
Saturday, 4 August (2:45 pm)	Perth 9.8 (62)	def.	West Perth 7.13 (55)	WACA
Saturday, 4 August (2:45 pm)	Claremont 8.11 (59)	def. by	South Fremantle 16.13 (109)	Subiaco Oval
Saturday, 4 August (2:45 pm)	East Fremantle 23.12 (150)	def.	East Perth 6.10 (46)	Fremantle Oval
Perth unexpectedly end a run of seven consecutive losses against the league leaders, who fail to adapt to muddy grounds resulting from a recurrence of June’s record rainfall.; East Fremantle forward George Doig returned for his first match since 1941 and kicked seven goals.

=== Round 15 ===
	Round 15
Saturday, 11 August (2:45 pm)	West Perth 11.10 (76)	def. by	South Fremantle 13.16 (94)	Leederville Oval
Saturday, 11 August (2:45 pm)	Swan Districts 10.20 (80)	def.	East Perth 8.7 (55)	Bassendean Oval
Saturday, 11 August (2:45 pm)	Perth 17.33 (135)	def.	Claremont 1.3 (9)	WACA
Saturday, 11 August (2:45 pm)	Subiaco 11.5 (71)	def. by	East Fremantle 12.15 (87)	Subiaco Oval
Perth’s win over Claremont set several records: 1. It remains the equal-lowest score in the WA(N)FL since Subiaco kicked 1.2 (8) against East Perth in 1920 – being equalled by East Perth in 2003.; 2. It remains Claremont’s lowest-ever score in the WANFL, with the previous lowest being 2.10 (22) against West Perth in 1935.; 3. It was the first time since East Perth against West Perth in 1913 that a senior WA(N)FL team failed to score in the first half.; 4. Perth’s 33 behinds was the most since East Fremantle’s record 41 against Midland Junction in 1917 and is still the equal second-most in league history.; Swan Districts came from 21 points behind to defeat East Perth, after kicking twelve consecutive behinds between the midpoints of the first and last quarters. It is the last time a WA(N)FL team has won without scoring any goals in the second and third quarters.

=== Round 16 ===
	Round 16
Saturday, 18 August (2:45 pm)	West Perth 7.15 (57)	def.	Swan Districts 5.7 (37)	Leederville Oval
Saturday, 18 August (2:45 pm)	East Perth 8.14 (62)	def. by	South Fremantle 13.9 (87)	Perth Oval
Saturday, 18 August (2:45 pm)	Perth 11.8 (74)	def. by	Subiaco 10.16 (76)	WACA
Saturday, 18 August (2:45 pm)	East Fremantle 23.19 (157)	def.	Claremont 9.5 (59)	Fremantle Oval (crowd: 2253)

=== Round 17 ===
	Round 17
Saturday, 25 August (2:45 pm)	Swan Districts 15.12 (102)	def.	South Fremantle 10.15 (75)	Bassendean Oval
Saturday, 25 August (2:45 pm)	East Perth 7.14 (56)	def. by	West Perth 14.7 (91)	Perth Oval
Saturday, 25 August (2:45 pm)	Claremont 6.11 (47)	def. by	Subiaco 18.15 (123)	Subiaco Oval
Saturday, 25 August (2:45 pm)	East Fremantle 19.7 (121)	def.	Perth 9.10 (64)	Fremantle Oval

=== Round 18 ===
	Round 18
Saturday, 1 September (2:45 pm)	West Perth 9.13 (67)	def.	Subiaco 6.17 (53)	Leederville Oval
Saturday, 1 September (2:45 pm)	Perth 7.12 (54)	def.	Swan Districts 6.17 (53)	WACA
Saturday, 1 September (2:45 pm)	Claremont 6.7 (43)	def. by	East Perth 16.19 (115)	Subiaco Oval
Saturday, 1 September (2:45 pm)	East Fremantle 18.15 (123)	def.	South Fremantle 12.14 (86)	Fremantle Oval
Swan Districts lost by one point against Perth after kicking 0.8 (8) with the breeze in the last quarter.

=== Round 19 ===
	Round 19
Saturday, 8 September (2:45 pm)	Subiaco 16.16 (112)	def.	South Fremantle 14.7 (91)	Subiaco Oval
Saturday, 8 September (2:45 pm)	East Perth 13.21 (99)	def.	Perth 9.14 (68)	Perth Oval
Saturday, 8 September (2:45 pm)	Claremont 10.10 (70)	def. by	Swan Districts 15.25 (115)	WACA
Saturday, 8 September (2:45 pm)	East Fremantle 19.13 (127)	def.	West Perth 11.9 (75)	Fremantle Oval

=== Round 20 ===
	Round 20
Saturday, 15 September (2:45 pm)	Subiaco 7.12 (54)	def. by	Swan Districts 11.13 (79)	Subiaco Oval
Saturday, 15 September (2:45 pm)	West Perth 10.14 (74)	def. by	Perth 14.9 (93)	Leederville Oval
Saturday, 15 September (2:45 pm)	South Fremantle 21.18 (144)	def.	Claremont 14.12 (96)	Fremantle Oval
Saturday, 15 September (2:45 pm)	East Perth 5.8 (38)	def. by	East Fremantle 9.19 (73)	Perth Oval
Swan Districts defeated Subiaco by 25 points in a match which directly decided which of the two teams finished fourth.

== Ladder ==
1945 WANFL ladder
Pos	Team	Pld	W	L	D	PF	PA	PP	Pts
1	East Fremantle (P)	20	16	4	0	2149	1400	153.5	64
2	West Perth	20	14	6	0	1777	1549	114.7	56
3	South Fremantle	20	12	8	0	1812	1749	103.6	48
4	Swan Districts	20	10	10	0	1648	1540	107.0	40
5	Subiaco	20	9	11	0	1532	1558	98.3	36
6	East Perth	20	9	11	0	1498	1585	94.5	36
7	Perth	20	8	12	0	1512	1617	93.5	32
8	Claremont	20	2	18	0	1272	2202	57.8	8

Rules for classification: 1) points; 2) percentage; 3) number of points for.
(P) Premiers

== Finals ==
=== First semi-final ===
	First semi-final
Saturday, 22 September (2:45 pm)	South Fremantle 16.13 (109)	def.	Swan Districts 9.11 (65)	Subiaco Oval (crowd: 10,500)
First-year rover Steve Marsh (South Fremantle) kicked eight goals.

=== Second semi-final ===
	Second semi-final
Saturday, 29 September (2:45 pm)	East Fremantle 14.14 (98)	def.	West Perth 6.10 (46)	Subiaco Oval (crowd: 18,000)
Ted Tyson played his last match for the Cardinals.

=== Preliminary final ===
	Preliminary final
Saturday, 6 October (2:45 pm)	West Perth 9.7 (61)	def. by	South Fremantle 16.11 (107)	Subiaco Oval (crowd: 13,000)

=== Grand Final ===
1945 WANFL Grand Final
Saturday, 13 October (2:45 pm)	East Fremantle	def.	South Fremantle	Subiaco Oval (crowd: 21,000)
2.2 (14); 5.6 (36); 6.10 (46); 12.15 (87)	Q1; Q2; Q3; Final	4.6 (30); 4.6 (30); 6.9 (45); 7.9 (51)	Umpires: Leo McComish; Simpson Medal: Alan Ebbs (East Fremantle)
Meiers 3, McDonald 3, George Doig 2, French, Prince, Alan Ebbs, Strang	Goals	Marsh 3, Reilly 2, Lewington, Lyon
Strang, Gabrielson, Alan Ebbs, Mann, Soltoggio, McDonald, Garrity, French	Best	"Scranno" Jenkins, Reilly, Marsh, Carbon, Erikson, Graham, Brown
