= 1907 WAFL Grand Final =

East Fremantle	Perth
5.11 (41)	6.6 (42)
- Date: Saturday, 28 September 1907
- Stadium: Claremont Showground
- Attendance: 8,500

The 1907 WAFL Grand Final was an Australian rules football game contested between the Perth Football Club and the East Fremantle Football Club, on 28 September 1907 at the Claremont Showground, to determine the premier team of the West Australian Football League (WAFL) for the 1907 season.

One of the most controversial matches in the league's history, the match was won on the day by East Fremantle by five points, then overturned on protest and awarded to Perth after the free kick which led to one of East Fremantle's goals was judged to have been awarded after the half time bell. The final result was a one-point win to Perth, 6.6 (42) d. East Fremantle, 5.11 (41). It was Perth's first premiership.

== Background ==
East Fremantle and Perth had been the strongest teams in the 1907 WAFL season, each finishing the home-and-away season with a 14–3 record; East Fremantle won the minor premiership by percentage. Those two clubs qualified for the grand final with wins in their semi-finals: East Fremantle defeated third-placed West Perth by ten points; and Perth defeated fourth-placed South Fremantle by four points. South Fremantle lodged a protest against the loss, arguing that one of its goals had been improperly changed to a touched behind by the field umpire, but this was dismissed.

This match was certain to decide the season's premiership: since the teams entered the match with equal win–loss records and the finals were played under the first amended Argus system, there was no possibility for a challenge match.

== Match ==
The match was played in fine weather conditions, with a very slight southerly breeze, at the Claremont Showground, with an estimated 8,500 in attendance. Ivo Crapp served as field umpire.

=== First quarter ===
In a first quarter which favoured East Fremantle, both teams had several early attacking chances repelled. However, ill discipline from Perth saw East Fremantle claim several free kicks and gain many of the best chances. East Fremantle scored first after ten minutes when Harry Sharpe kicked a behind; and soon after, Sharpe passed the ball to Billy McIntyre who kicked the game's opening goal. McIntyre scored another behind shortly afterwards, giving East Fremantle an eight point advantage. Another East Fremantle attack was marked at the goal-face by Perth defender Ronald Southee and repelled.

Perth advanced next, benefitting from two free kicks, from the second of which Ossie Winton scored their opening goal. East Fremantle pressed next, scoring two behinds (Sharpe from a long place kick and McIntyre after a pass from Sharpe). Perth scored one more behind, from Harry Nankervis, before the end of the quarter.

At quarter time, East Fremantle 1.4 (10) led Perth 1.1 (7) by only three points, despite overall having the better of the quarter, with better marking and teamwork compared with Perth, whose kicking efficiency was poor.

=== Second quarter ===
Perth had the better of the chances in the second quarter, with several rushes forward throughout the quarter which made the game challenging for the East Fremantle defenders. Harry Edmondson and Eddie Thompson both missed with early chances. Edmondson missed another shot later; but then kicked Perth's second goal after intercepting the kick-off from that behind. Perth attacked from the ensuing centre bounce, and Billy Orr kicked Perth's third goal from a snap shot. It was not until late in the quarter that play evened up, with both teams had several attacking chances repelled, with no more scores until the very end of the quarter.

Just after the bell rang for half time, East Fremantle half-forward Charles Doig was awarded a free kick for holding the man against St. John Kennedy in a ground contest; he kicked a goal from his after-the-siren kick to narrow the on-field margin to six points, Perth 3.4 (22) leading East Fremantle 2.4 (16). It was this free kick, and conjecture over whether it was awarded before or after the half time bell, which led to the Perth's protest after the game, and this goal which was ultimately removed from the score.

=== Third quarter ===
East Fremantle took control the game in the third quarter. Early pressure resulted in a behind to Dolly Christy, then a goal to Albert Heinrichs from a snap shot. Orr received a wide-angle free kick, which missed. Late goals were scored by George Brown and Christy. Perth had four scoring chances in the quarter, but managed only two behinds. A three-quarter time, the on-field score showed East Fremantle 5.8 (38) leading Perth 3.6 (24) by 14 points.

=== Final quarter ===
East Fremantle opened the final quarter with a strong attack, Sharpe kicking another goal from a snap shot to extend the on-field margin to 20 points and prompt some portions of the crowd to leave. Perth then swung the momentum of the game, making several attacking raids over the next ten minutes, netting three goals: the first came from mark by Edmondson, the second from Roy Wilson, and the third from Nankervis. With twelve minutes remaining, the on-field score showed East Perth only four points ahead, and soon after they increased the margin to five. However, Perth had all of the remaining attacking chances; Orr and Wilson both had late chances to kick goals, but neither scored. Perth continued to attack, but the final bell sounded before they could score again. The final onfield score showed East Fremantle 6.11 (47) defeating Perth 6.6 (42) by five points.

=== Overall ===
The Sunday Times' sportswriter considered East Fremantle wingman Archie Strang the best player on the ground, who was able to both contribute strongly and beat Perth star Andrew Ferguson in his position. East Fremantle ruckman Albert Heinrichs was also singled out for praise. Perth's team performance was relatively even, with veteran forward Jack Leckie the team's best on the day.

== Protest ==
After the match, Perth lodged two points of protest against the result of the game:
1. That the goal kicked by Charles Doig at half time was wrongly recorded, inasmuch as the free from which it was kicked was awarded after the ringing of the bell
2. That the goal kicked by George Brown was wrongly awarded to East Fremantle in the third quarter and should have been scored a behind.
The WAFL board of management met on Tuesday 1 October to discuss the protest, in a meeting which ran until after midnight.

=== Doig goal ===
Umpire Ivo Crapp testified his recollection of the free kick against St. John Kennedy, recalling that he blew his whistle, and then heard the bell immediately afterwards. He testified that had he would have conferred with the timekeepers had he not been sure that his whistle had beaten the bell.

The two timekeepers, one provided by each club, gave very different accounts of the incident. Perth timekeeper Frank Kennedy, who rang the bell, testified that he had finished ringing it about two seconds before Crapp blew his whistle; upon seeing that Crapp had awarded a free kick, he rang it again, then reported the issue to the Perth secretary. East Fremantle timekeeper R. G. Salter, testified that he heard the whistle five seconds before Kennedy began to ring the bell. Salter also admitted to having a 10/– bet with a friend on East Fremantle to win the game, but denied this affected his impartiality as a timekeeper.

Perth submitted a total of 47 witnesses, all testifying that they had heard the bell prior to the whistle, usually by somewhere between two and fifteen seconds. Witnesses included: the penalised player St. John Kennedy; the goal umpire J. Webb, a delegate from West Perth, who had begun leaving the field before returning to adjudicate on the goal; delegates from several other clubs and private citizens who were spectators at the match, including two who famously testified to having left for the bar after hearing the bell; and several Perth players including Henry Edmondson, captain John Leckie, Lou Cherry, and Dick Kennedy. Kennedy claimed to have spoken with Crapp about the timing of the bell on the field, and Crapp denied having the conversation.

East Fremantle presented only five witnesses, who testified that the bell went two to five seconds after the whistle, including: match boundary umpire Ernest Cooper, official scorer Jefferys, the free kick recipient Charles Doig, and East Fremantle player Dick Sweetman.

The relevant sub-clauses of the Laws of the Game at that time read:

From Law 4: "At the first sound of the bell the ball shall be dead, but in the event of a player having marked the ball before the bell has rung, he shall be allowed his kick..."
From Law 14: "The controlling body shall appoint for each match a field umpire, who shall have full control of play."
From Law 16: "Two goal umpires shall be appointed for each match. They shall be sole judges of goals and behinds, and their decision shall be final, except in cases where the ball has become dead, either by ringing of the bell or by decision of the field umpire... a goal or behind given in accordance with the above cannot be annulled."

East Fremantle cited the interaction between Laws 14 and 16 as supporting the dismissal of the protest, while Perth also claimed the support of Law 16. There was ambiguity in the interpretation of Laws 4 and 14, in that it was not clear whether or not the field umpire's 'full control of play' included adjudicating the timing of the bell.

Following the presentation of evidence, the Appeals Board upheld Perth's protest, finding that the weight of evidence supported that the bell had first been rung prior to the whistle, and therefore that the free kick and resultant goal were improperly awarded. Doig's goal was struck from the record, and the result of the match was amended to a Perth victory, 6.6 (42) d. 5.11 (41).

=== Brown goal ===
Perth's second point of protest contended that Brown's goal in the third quarter could have been improperly awarded, based on a conversation alleged to have been overheard between central umpire Crapp and goal umpire Webb, in which Webb expressed doubt over whether a goal or behind had been scored before awarding the goal; the identity of the person who heard the conversation was not given. Perth's protest did not directly call for the score to be reversed, but rather for Webb to explain his decision. Webb denied the conversation and demanded an apology, and Perth withdrew the second point of protest.

=== Reaction ===
The decision drew surprise from many observers. In particular, many noted that while Perth's position was supported a greater number of witnesses, East Fremantle's position was supported by the higher calibre of witnesses whose statements should have had more weight, including all of the game's appointed neutral officials. (Goal umpire J. Webb, who testified for Perth, was not an appointed goal umpire, but a West Perth delegate who agreed at the last minute to cover the appointed goal umpire's absence). The Appeal Board was also criticised for allowing the clubs to submit club-affiliated witnesses at all, pointing to the League's refusal to allow South Fremantle to submit outside witnesses when it protested its semi-final loss against Perth only two weeks earlier; this led to Perth's numbers advantage in witnesses, as East Fremantle had elected not to bring outside witnesses on the expectation that they would not be permitted. Among the critics was East Fremantle captain Tom Wilson, who raised both points in a published news article the following day.

Fremantle newspapers reacted negatively to the news. The Evening Mail took a scathing line, leading with the headline "Perth premiers: beaten in football, they win in argument" in an acerbic article decrying the decision; the Empire was more measured in its language, but accused the largely Perth-based appeals board of regional and classist bias against the Fremantle-based clubs for both this decision, and the semi-final decision against South Fremantle.

Perth captain Jack Leckie commented "there is not a single man in the team who would not rather have done without [the premiership] than accept it under such conditions", and wished that the appeals board had declared no result and a rematch, rather than reverse the result of the game.

== Aftermath ==
Before the 1 October meeting closed, Perth stated that it did not want to win the premiership on the protest, and offered East Fremantle a rematch for the following Saturday; however, at the regular League meeting on 2 October, the league ruled out an official rematch, as it would have required three weeks' procedural notice to change the rules governing the premiership; East Fremantle also declined an unofficial exhibition match.

Following the game, Perth and the Goldfields Football League's premier Boulder City attempted to arrange a fixture to decide the West Australian State Premiership as part of Boulder City's post-season visit to the coast; however, scheduling difficulties prevented this. In particular, Boulder City had arranged a match with South Fremantle on Fremantle Oval for its last Saturday on the coast; in an act of solidarity, South Fremantle yielded the fixture to East Fremantle, but refused to yield it to Perth; and, since the State Premiership was technically a tour match arranged privately between the clubs, the league had no power to change South Fremantle's mind. Some Fremantle newspapers still promoted the game as the State Premiership, although it is not recognised as such, and Boulder City 8.9 (57) defeated East Fremantle 5.3 (33).

On 30 October, East Fremantle tabled a letter asking the League to refer the matter of the premiership to the Australasian Football Council, which was turned down. The East Fremantle delegate threatened to take the appeal to the Supreme Court of Western Australia, but the threat was empty.

In November 1910, the Australasian Football Council amended Law 4, adding the sentence "the field umpire shall be the sole judge as to the first sound of the bell," to the law, formally resolving any ambiguity between Laws 4 and 14. Perth's protest would certainly have been dismissed under the amended law; and similar protests, which until 1910 were often successful if there was reasonable evidence about the timing of the bell, were thereafter almost never upheld.

== Scorecard ==
1907 WAFL Grand Final
Saturday, 28 September	East Fremantle	def. by	Perth	Claremont Showground (crowd: 8,500)
1.4 (10); 1.4 (10); 4.8 (32); 5.11 (41)	Q1; Q2; Q3; Final	1.1 (7); 3.4 (22); 3.6 (24); 6.6 (42)	Umpires: Ivo Crapp
McIntyre, Heinrichs, Browne, Christy, Sharpe	Goals	Edmondson 2, Winton, Orr, Wilson, Nankervis
Strang, Heinrichs, Wilson, Honeybone, Parsons	Best	Leckie, Ferguson, Southee, Crase, R. Kennedy
Brown	Injuries
A second quarter goal by Charles Doig (East Fremantle) was annulled on protest.

== Teams ==
East Fremantle
B:	Jim Beswick	Ernest Kjellgren	Hooky Doig
HB:	Leonard Bidstrup	Scotty Doig	Tom Wilson (c)
C:	Robert Honeybone	Sydney Parsons	Archie Strang
HF:	Chitter Brown	Harry Sharpe	Charles Doig
F:	Billy McIntyre	Burley Hesketh	Dolly Christy
Foll:	Albert Heinrichs	Dick Scott	Dick Sweetman

Perth
B:	Ronald Southee	Harold Crase	Reg Cherry
HB:	St. John Kennedy	Len Edwards	Dick Kennedy
C:	Lou Cherry	Douglas Moffat	Andrew Ferguson
HF:	Arthur Gilligan	Roy Wilson	Harry Nankervis
F:	Jack Leckie (c)	Harry Edmondson	Ossie Winton
Foll:	Squeaker Clarke	Eddie Thompson	Billy Orr

== See also ==
AFL siren controversy, a similar protest in 2006
