= Charles Doig =

Charles Doig may refer to:

- Charles C. Doig (1855–1918), Scottish architect
- Charles Doig Sr. (1883–1944), Australian rules football player and coach
- Charles Doig, Jr. (1912–1980), Australian rules footballer, son of the above

== See also ==
- Doig family
- Doig (surname)
