= Henry Edmondson =

Henry Edmondson or Edmundson may refer to:

- Henry Edmondson (sportsman) (1872–1946), Australian rules footballer and cricketer
- Henry Edmondson (educationalist) (1607–1659), English schoolmaster
- Henry A. Edmundson (1814–1890), congressman and lawyer
- Henry A. Edmondson (1833–1918), Confederate officer and Virginia state legislator
