= 1955 WANFL grand final =

1955 WANFL Grand Final
| Perth | East Fremantle |
|---|---|
| 11.11 (77) | 11.9 (75) |
- Date: Saturday, 8 October 1955
- Stadium: Subiaco Oval
- Attendance: 41,659

Accolades
- Simpson Medal: Merv McIntosh (Perth)

The 1955 WANFL grand final was an Australian rules football game contested between the Perth Football Club and the East Fremantle Football Club, on 8 October 1955 at Subiaco Oval, to determine the premier team of the Western Australian National Football League (WANFL) for the 1955 season.

In one of the most famous grand finals in WANFL history, Perth came back from a 34-point half-time deficit to win the game by two points, 11.11 (77) to 11.9 (75), to break a 48-year premiership drought to win its second ever premiership. Club and league legend Merv McIntosh was awarded the Simpson Medal as best on ground after a dominant performance in his final match. The game was attended by 41,659 people, at the time a record attendance for any football game in Western Australia.

== Background ==
The period of Western Australian football following the Second World War was dominated by four teams: South Fremantle, East Fremantle, Perth, West Perth – those teams having occupied the top four positions in all but one season between 1947 and 1955. On this occasion, South Fremantle (16–4) was minor premier ahead of East Fremantle (16–4) on percentage; Perth (14–6) was third and West Perth (13–7) was fourth. East Fremantle defeated South Fremantle by 19 points in the second semi-final to qualify for the grand final; Perth defeated West Perth by 22 points in the first semi-final, then defeated South Fremantle by 12 points in the preliminary final to qualify.

East Fremantle was historically the most successful club in the competition, having won 21 premierships up to this point, which was ten more than any other club, although it had not won one since 1946. Perth, despite its post-war period of success, remained one of the least successful clubs in the competition, having won only one premiership previously, in 1907; it had finished runner-up on seven occasions, most recently with grand final losses against West Perth in 1949 and South Fremantle in 1950.

== Match ==
The match was played at Subiaco Oval. A new ground and state record attendance of 41,659 attended the match,^{[A]} exceeding the previous record of 40,000 set at the state's 1937 carnival match against Victoria. Playing conditions were dominated by the Fremantle Doctor, a strong breeze blowing from the western end of the ground, and the team kicking with it was thought to have a four-goal advantage in each quarter. In the seconds grand final, played as a curtain-raiser, Perth 9.13 (67) defeated West Perth 5.6 (36).

Perth was captained by Keith Harper and coached by Ern Henfry, who had retired as a player the previous season. East Fremantle had long-time rover Jack Sheedy as their captain, and were coached by George Meiers in his second season.

=== First quarter ===
Perth kicked with the breeze in the first quarter, and attacked strongly and early, but kicked waywardly in front of goal, kicking four behinds in the first ten minutes of the match. Adopting a short-passing game into the wind, East Fremantle worked the ball forward to Ray Howard, who marked and kicked the game's opening goal after 12 minutes to give East Fremantle the lead. This was East Fremantle's only score of the quarter, as Perth continued to take attack with wind and East Fremantle packed its defense. Perth retook the lead after Reg Zeuner kicked its first goal from a mark and drop kick, and late in the quarter kicked its second after Roy Harper received a free kick in the forward line. At quarter time, Perth 2.7 (19) led East Fremantle 1.0 (6) by 13 points, having wasted much of the advantage offered it by the wind.

Perth ruckman Merv McIntosh was the dominant player on the ground, giving Perth strong drive from the ruck, with Frank Walker also a strong ball-winner for the Redlegs. Alan Preen was best in the centre for East Fremantle.

=== Second quarter ===
Now with the advantage of the breeze, East Fremantle began to dominate the game, despite McIntosh continuing to control the ruck for Perth. Goals came quickly from Frank Coulson, Jim Conway (who kicked three goals for the quarter), Johnson, Sheedy and Con Regan. After a dominant seven goals to no score with the aid of the breeze for the quarter, East Fremantle 8.5 (53) led Perth 2.7 (19) by 34 points at half time.

=== Third quarter ===
Now kicking with the breeze, Perth took control of the game. They also made a key positional change, moving vice-captain Bert Wansbrough from centre half back to full forward – Wansbrough was the club's leading goalkicker for the season, but it was nevertheless not uncommon for him to play key positions at both ends of the ground.

Roy Harper won a strong contest early in the quarter to kick Perth's third goal, and East Fremantle centre half-back Bob Hicks came off the ground shortly afterwards, suffering a leg injury from the same contest. From the ensuing centre bounce, Perth drove straight forward to Wansbrough, who marked and kicked the team's fourth goal. Perth continued its attack, but was again wayward in front of goal, Zeuner kicking consecutive behinds, before a third set shot fell just short and was marked in front of the goal line by Wansbrough, who kicked his second goal. Two more goals followed, one to Wansbrough for his third for the quarter, and one to Walker.

After five goals to one behind with the breeze to all but erase its half time deficit, Perth 7.10 (52) trailed East Fremantle 8.6 (54) by only two points at three quarter time. However, with East Fremantle kicking with the wind in the final quarter, and only seven of the game's 106 points hitherto kicked against the wind, East Fremantle was still in a dominant position.

=== Final quarter ===
East Fremantle attacked first, and two early goals to Jack Sheedy – the first from open play and the second from a free kick – saw East Fremantle extend its lead to 15 points. But Perth was able to fight back, and a brilliant individual effort by Frank Walker saw him outpace two opponents to kick Perth's first goal into the wind from a wide angle. Another goal soon after to Wansbrough, his fourth of the second half, narrowed the margin to three points.

Perth worked to nullify its wind disadvantage by repeatedly forcing the ball out of bounds along the grandstand side of the ground. East Fremantle broke away from one of these boundary contests, but Regan missed his shot at goal. Sheedy then kicked his fourth goal, and third of the quarter, to extend the advantage to more than a goal. Further East Fremantle attacks over the subsequent minutes were repelled by Perth, particularly by full-back Brian Ashbolt. Perth attacked, and a free kick to Bill Curtis allowed him to kick a goal, reducing the margin to less than a goal. Two more East Fremantle attacks were repelled by Perth centre half-back Terry Moriarty, who outmarked Sheedy on both occasions.

The next Perth attack resulted in a behind to Des Foynes, reducing the margin to four points. The rebound from the kick-off was intercepted by Zeuner, whose attacking kick was marked in a big pack mark by Tom Davis in the pocket; he kicked the goal and put Perth in front by two points with seven minutes remaining. Perth flooded back to defend its lead, and McIntosh continued to dominate the ruck, repeatedly and deliberately putting the ball out of bounds to quell East Fremantle's attempts to attack – by reports putting the ball out seven times in the final minutes of the game alone. The siren sounded, and after kicking four goals to three into the strong breeze, Perth 11.11 (77) defeated East Fremantle 11.9 (75).

=== Simpson Medal ===
Perth ruckman Merv McIntosh was awarded the Simpson Medal as the best player on the ground for his dominant performance throughout the game, particularly his game-saving contests when Perth was defending is slim lead in the final quarter. It was his third Simpson Medal and first in a grand final, his previous two coming from interstate matches. For McIntosh, widely considered one of the greatest players in Western Australian football history, it was the first and only premiership of his career, coming in his 217th and final club game. His heroics in the come-from-behind performance, breaking both personal and club premiership droughts, are among the most widely celebrated fairytale stories in the history of the sport.

=== Scorecard ===
1955 WANFL grand final
Saturday, 8 October 2:15pm | Perth | def. | East Fremantle | Subiaco Oval (crowd: 41,659)
2.7 (19); 2.7 (19); 7.10 (52); 11.11 (77) | Q1; Q2; Q3; Final | 1.0 (6); 8.5 (53); 8.6 (54); 11.9 (75) | Umpires: Green; Simpson Medal: Merv McIntosh
Wansbrough 4 Harper, Walker 2 Curtis, Davis, Zeuner 1 | Goals | 4 Sheedy; 3 Conway; 2 Howard; 1 Johnson, Regan
McIntosh | Best | Sheedy

== Notes ==
- ^{A} This is the crowd figure according to the West Australian Football League. Other sources give attendances of 41,962 and 38,962.
