= Reg Zeuner =

Australian rules footballer

Personal information
- Full name: Reginald Jack Zeuner
- Nickname: Reg
- Born: 19 January 1928
- Died: 3 November 1986 (aged 58)
- Original team: West Adelaide juniors
- Positions: Ruckman, centre half-forward, full-forward

Playing career^{1}
| Years | Club | Games (Goals) |
| 1946–48; 1952 | West Adelaide | 59 (124) |
| 1949–51; 1953–59 | Perth | 209 (219) |
| Total | | 268 (343) |

Representative team honours
| Years | Team | Games (Goals) |
| 1950–57 | Western Australia | 6 (1) |
- ^{1} Playing statistics correct to the end of 1959.

Career highlights
- West Adelaide leading goalkicker 1947; West Adelaide premiership side 1947; Perth premiership side 1955; Runner-up Sandover Medal 1956; Perth best and fairest 1958

Reginald Jack "Reg" Zeuner (19 January 1928 – 3 November 1986) was an Australian rules footballer who played for West Adelaide in the South Australian National Football League (SANFL) and Perth in the Western Australian National Football League (WANFL).

== Career ==
Zeuner began his career with the West Adelaide colts team in 1945, and was promoted to the senior team in 1946. In 1947 he led West Adelaide's goalkicking with 53 goals, including five in the club's premiership victory over Norwood. In 1949 Zeuner transferred to WANFL side Perth, where he played mainly as a forward, substituting as a ruckman when Merv McIntosh was unfit. In 1952, Zeuner returned to West Adelaide, having previously had a clearance to Geelong in the Victorian Football League (VFL) refused. He returned to Perth in 1954, and played in Perth's 1955 premiership victory, kicking two goals. Playing as Perth's main ruckman after the retirement of McIntosh before the 1956 season, Zeuner finished runner-up in the 1956 Sandover Medal to East Perth's Graham Farmer. He later won Perth's best and fairest in 1958, before retiring at the end of the 1959 season. Zeuner also represented the WANFL as a forward at the 1950 Brisbane and 1953 Adelaide Carnivals, as well as one match in 1957. In 1999, he was selected as a reserve in Perth's Team of the Century.
