= Terry Moriarty =

Australian rules footballer

Personal information
- Full name: Terrence Brian Moriarty
- Born: 3 July 1925; East Victoria Park, Western Australia
- Died: 23 October 2011 (aged 86); Nedlands, Western Australia
- Original team: Victoria Park
- Position: Defender

Playing career^{1}
Years	Club	Games (Goals)
1942–1958	Perth	253 (27)
1944	South Sydney	7 (0)

Representative team honours
Years	Team	Games (Goals)
1948–1954	Western Australia	9 (2)
- ^{1} Playing statistics correct to the end of 1958.

Career highlights
- Perth best and fairest 1942, 1943; Perth captain 1943; Sandover Medal 1943; Perth premiership side 1955; West Australian Football Hall of Fame 2010

Terrence Brian "Terry" Moriarty (3 July 1925 – 23 October 2011) was an Australian rules footballer who played with the Perth Football Club in the West Australian National Football League (WANFL). Having won the club's best and fairest trophy in his first two seasons, Moriarty went on to play 253 games over a 15-season career, which remains a club record. He also played nine interstate matches for Western Australia. Having also served in the Australian Army during World War II, he was the winner of the 1943 Sandover Medal as the best player in the competition, and was inducted into the West Australian Football Hall of Fame in 2010.

== Career ==
Born in East Victoria Park, Moriarty played under-12 and under-14 matches for Victoria Park in the local Temperance League, and progressed to the Victoria Park side in the Metropolitan Juniors Football Association (MJFA) in 1941, aged 16. He attended St Patrick's Boys' School and Aquinas College, playing football for both schools.

Falling into the Perth Football Club's recruitment zone, he made his senior debut for Perth in 1942 in the wartime age-restricted competition,^{[a]} and won the club's fairest and best trophy in his first season, playing mainly off a half-back flank. He finished equal fourth in the 1942 Sandover Medal for the fairest and best player in the competition, with nine votes. In 1943, he won both his club's best and fairest and the Sandover Medal, finishing with 28 votes to become the first Perth player to win the award.^{[b]}

Moriarty enlisted in the Army in September 1943, serving as a gunner in the 2nd Medium Regiment of the Royal Australian Artillery.

He was posted to Sydney for training, and played seven games with the South Sydney Football Club in the Sydney Australian Rules Football League. He returned to Western Australia in time for the first game of the 1946 season, and was discharged from service in September 1946. He played with Perth on their tour of the Eastern states in July–August 1946, which included matches in Broken Hill, Wagga Wagga and Sydney. The game at Broken Hill attracted 5,000 spectators paying £389/15/9 where he was named in the best but did not kick a goal. Broken Hill won The game against Southern Riverina was played at the Rock before a crowd of 1750 which was a record for a mid-week game in the area. Perth won 18.25 (133) to 14.4 (88). The game against NSW was played at Trumper Park on 11 August, and reportedly attracted a crowd in excess of 10,000 paying an amazing £464/14/6 at the gate, with Perth winning the game 22.15 (147) to 18.16 (124).

Most often used as a half-back flanker, Moriarty played in two losing grand finals for Perth, in 1949 and 1950, before finally achieving a premiership in 1955, despite receiving a broken nose during the grand final. He retired in 1958 after 253 games, which remains a club record. Towards the end of his career, he had been restricted by recurring hamstring injuries.

Moriarty was inducted into the West Australian Football Hall of Fame in 2010, and died at Sir Charles Gairdner Hospital in Nedlands on 23 October 2011, after a short illness, with The West Australian noting he was a "dour ball player with strong team values".

== Notes ==
- ^{a} Due to a large number of players being unavailable due to military service, the WANFL was limited to players under the age of 18 years for three seasons from 1942 to 1944. Games played and awards won during this period of time are still counted as official.
- ^{b} Cyril Hoft of Perth tied with Tom Outridge for the 1921 medal, but lost on countback, having played less games. Hoft was retrospectively awarded a medal in 1997, so is technically the first Perth player to win the award.
