= 1970 WANFL season =

Western Australian National Football League season

- Teams: 8
- Premiers: South Fremantle; 9th premiership
- Minor premiers: Perth; 5th minor premiership
- Sandover Medallist: Pat Dalton (Perth); Bill Walker (Swan Districts) (Note: Walker lost on a countback, but was retrospectively awarded a Medal by the Westar Rules hierarchy in 1997.)
- Leading goalkicker: Austin Robertson, Jr. (Subiaco)

Attendance
- Matches played: 88
- Total attendance: 936,632 (10,644 per match)
- Highest: 17,836

The 1970 WANFL season was the 86th season of the Western Australian National Football League. After four years of dominance by the three Perth clubs, 1970 saw 1969 wooden spooners South Fremantle, aided by a tough pre-season training program under coach "Hassa" Mann (a three-time Melbourne premiership player) and the arrival of Len Clark and John O‘Reilly from the VFL, rise to take their first premiership since the 1947–1954 dynasty. The Bulldogs (as the club had recently become known) upset Perth in two finals in wet conditions, while 1969 premiers West Perth fell to sixth with only ten victories: indeed this was the first season since 1955 with East Perth that legendary ruckman "Polly" Farmer had played for a team that missed the finals. The Cardinals were affected by the loss of John Wynne to Norwood, backup ruckmen Brian Sampson and Neil Evans to retirement and Greg Astbury to a major stomach problem, plus a dispute over Bill Valli, whose clearance to Collingwood was refused by the WANFL and the club's severe lack of depth in its reserves. Of the lower sides from previous seasons, in addition to South Fremantle's surprise flag Claremont showed major improvement due to such young players as Moss, winning more games than in any season since 1965, and would have done much better but for long-term injuries to rover Bruce Duperouzel and centre half-forward Lindsay Carroll in the second half of the season, when they fell out of the four after looking like a second semi-final berth.

Despite a much wetter winter than the drought year of 1969, scoring in 1970 was higher than ever before, exceeding 100 points per team per game for the first time, including a record highest losing score. This was largely due to the "out of bounds on the full" rule which the WANFL adopted for the first time after its success in the 1969 VFL season. Attendances for the home-and-away season also hit a never-to-be-equalled average of 9,644 per match, aided by South's revival. The season, unusually, lasted a week beyond the conclusion of the senior premiership due to a draw in the reserves Grand Final between East Fremantle and Subiaco.

Although Swan Districts finished with its second wooden spoon in three seasons, captain-coach Bill Walker – whose coaching was often severely criticised – became the only player to win four Sandover Medals when awarded a retrospective Medal by Westar Rules in 1997.

== Home-and-away season ==
=== Round 1 ===
	Round 1
Saturday, 4 April (2:15 pm)	Perth 20.15 (135)	def.	South Fremantle 13.12 (90)	Lathlain Park (crowd: 10298)
Saturday, 4 April (2:15 pm)	Subiaco 21.18 (144)	def.	East Perth 14.16 (100)	Subiaco Oval (crowd: 10520)
Saturday, 4 April (2:15 pm)	Claremont 15.18 (108)	def.	West Perth 15.13 (103)	Claremont Oval (crowd: 12061)
Saturday, 4 April (2:15 pm)	East Fremantle 22.20 (152)	def.	Swan Districts 12.11 (83)	East Fremantle Oval (crowd: 9138)
Pat Dalton's dominance of the centre exposed a flaw in the old playing-coach system as South Fremantle's "Hassa" Mann moves from his centre position to other areas and allows the Demon centreman such control that the black and reds score 16.10 (106) to 5.7 (37) after half-time.; East Fremantle completely outclass the inexperienced Swan Districts defence and ruck, with Neil Dedman capitalising via seven goals as Bill Walker does nothing.; The opening attendance was a record for Claremont Oval, beating the 11,626 against South Fremantle in Round 20 of 1967.

=== Round 2 ===
	Round 2
Saturday, 11 April (2:15 pm)	West Perth 11.15 (81)	def. by	Subiaco 14.17 (101)	Leederville Oval (crowd: 14048)
Saturday, 11 April (2:15 pm)	Swan Districts 8.11 (59)	def. by	Perth 25.19 (169)	Bassendean Oval (crowd: 8301)
Saturday, 11 April (2:15 pm)	East Perth 12.16 (88)	def. by	Claremont 19.19 (133)	Perth Oval (crowd: 11488)
Saturday, 11 April (2:15 pm)	South Fremantle 19.13 (127)	def.	East Fremantle 10.15 (75)	Fremantle Oval (crowd: 12786)
East Fremantle's stereotyped tactics allow South complete control on the ball and Mann leaving the centre vacant to serve as a loose man in attack, the newly christened Bulldogs led by eighty points before easing off.; Greg Bennett and Grahan Jenzen cover the loss of Barry Cable perfectly, and when Walker moves St. Kilda recruit Ian Cooper to centre half-forward, Perth score an amazing 10.5 (65) into the wind in the third quarter for a crushing victory.

=== Round 3 ===
	Round 3
Saturday, 18 April (2:15 pm)	Swan Districts 17.16 (118)	def. by	South Fremantle 19.14 (128)	Bassendean Oval (crowd: 6472)
Saturday, 18 April (2:15 pm)	East Perth 15.8 (98)	def.	West Perth 12.8 (80)	Perth Oval (crowd: 13222)
Saturday, 18 April (2:15 pm)	Claremont 20.12 (132)	def.	Subiaco 19.17 (131)	Claremont Oval (crowd: 15782)
Saturday, 18 April (2:15 pm)	East Fremantle 14.13 (97)	def. by	Perth 17.14 (116)	East Fremantle Oval (crowd: 8021)
West Perth's depth problem – their reserves scored only 1.12 (18) and having to play half-forward Stephen Smeath as a rover – sees East Perth (themselves badly depleted by injuries) run away after a scrappy first half, with veteran wingman Derek Chadwick the matchwinner.; In front of a second consecutive Claremont Oval crowd record, the Tigers produce an amazing comeback from 43 points behind early in the last quarter to win a thriller, with Austin Robertson missing three easy shots that would have saved the game for the Maroons and umpire Ray Scott failing to hear the siren for twenty seconds after it sounded.

=== Interstate Trial ===
Western Australian Interstate Trial Match
Saturday, 27 April	"Polly" Farmer's XVIII	def. by	Eric Sarich's XVIII	Subiaco Oval (crowd: 5,569)
3.3 (21); 7.9 (51); 12.17 (89); 14.22 (106)	Q1; Q2; Q3; Final	5.4 (34); 11.8 (74); 13.8 (86); 19.13 (127)	Umpires: J. Fuhrmann
Grljusich 4.3; Smeath 3.3; Scott 3.2; Cox 2.4; Melrose 1.3; Watling 1.1; Richards 0.2; Farmer, Orr, Moss 0.1	Goals	4.1 Jenzen; 3.3 Thomson; 3.0 Russell Reynolds; 2.3 Metropolis; 2.1 Cooper; 2.0 Dalton; 1.1 Jacks, Beeching; 1.0 Smart; 0.1 John Reilly, Page
Orr, Grljusich, Smith, McAullay, Moss, Cox	Best	Whinnen (best on ground), Williams, Smart, Jenzen, Russell Reynolds, Page
The first interstate trial match on Anzac Day since 1961 had its revenue donated to the Anzac Day Trust Fund, and saw Claremont's Russell Reynolds and Vern Orr emerge as the leading new lights for carnival selection.

=== Round 4 ===
	Round 4
Saturday, 2 May (2:15 pm)	Subiaco 23.28 (166)	def.	Swan Districts 12.13 (85)	Subiaco Oval (crowd: 7420)
Saturday, 2 May (2:15 pm)	Perth 7.8 (50)	def. by	East Perth 15.13 (103)	Lathlain Park (crowd: 12178)
Saturday, 2 May (2:15 pm)	South Fremantle 15.20 (110)	def.	Claremont 10.20 (80)	Fremantle Oval (crowd: 13964)
Saturday, 2 May (2:15 pm)	West Perth 20.14 (134)	def.	East Fremantle 11.12 (78)	Leederville Oval (crowd: 9474)
After a shaky start, an East Perth team featuring only ten of its 1969 Grand Final players demolishes a feeble Perth via hard defence on a perfect day for football.

=== Round 5 ===
	Round 5
Saturday, 9 May (2:15 pm)	Subiaco 16.18 (114)	def. by	South Fremantle 17.18 (120)	Subiaco Oval (crowd: 12922)
Saturday, 9 May (2:15 pm)	Perth 7.9 (51)	def. by	West Perth 13.18 (96)	Lathlain Park (crowd: 9759)
Saturday, 9 May (2:15 pm)	Swan Districts 16.19 (115)	def.	East Perth 16.17 (113)	Bassendean Oval (crowd: 6783)
Saturday, 9 May (2:15 pm)	East Fremantle 15.15 (105)	def. by	Claremont 25.19 (169)	East Fremantle Oval (crowd: 7953)
West Perth's short, accurate handball and Whinnen's eclipse of Dalton in the centre crushes Perth, who score only 2.2 (14) to three-quarter time in perfect conditions.; Coach Mann's policy of using seven followers (Note: This policy was made illegal in 1973 when a "centre diamond" (later the current centre square) was introduced, within with no team could place more than four players during a centre bounce.) upsets the Lions, shadowing Bunton, Ron Jacks and Peter Burton enough to with. South do not use conventional set positions and Fred Seinor kicks five goals from full-forward despite starting centre bounces in the ruck.; A superb solo performance from captain-coach Walker leads Swan Districts to a huge upset as East Perth appear to take a casual attitude after establishing a six-goal lead early in the second quarter.

=== Round 6 ===
	Round 6
Saturday, 16 May (2:15 pm)	South Fremantle 19.18 (132)	def.	West Perth 12.20 (92)	Fremantle Oval (crowd: 15591)
Saturday, 16 May (2:15 pm)	Subiaco 17.10 (112)	def.	Perth 11.16 (82)	Subiaco Oval (crowd: 8754)
Saturday, 16 May (2:15 pm)	Claremont 19.29 (143)	def.	Swan Districts 13.14 (92)	Claremont Oval (crowd: 8931)
Saturday, 16 May (2:15 pm)	East Perth 28.18 (186)	def.	East Fremantle 16.18 (114)	Perth Oval (crowd: 8721)
Subiaco's decision to rotate captain-coach Bunton, Burton and Jacks on and off the ball lifts the Maroons to a solid comeback won over Perth, let down by its attacking deficiencies whilst Robertson score 8.4 (52).; East Perth kick the highest score against East Fremantle to that point, beating West Perth's 26.15 (171) from ten seasons beforehand.

=== Round 7 ===
	Round 7
Saturday, 23 May (2:15 pm)	West Perth 18.18 (126)	def.	Swan Districts 11.6 (72)	Leederville Oval (crowd: 8231)
Saturday, 23 May (2:15 pm)	East Perth 15.24 (114)	def.	South Fremantle 12.13 (85)	Perth Oval (crowd: 14589)
Saturday, 23 May (2:15 pm)	Perth 10.17 (77)	def. by	Claremont 13.9 (87)	Lathlain Park (crowd: 8829)
Saturday, 23 May (2:15 pm)	East Fremantle 7.8 (50)	def. by	Subiaco 11.9 (75)	East Fremantle Oval (crowd: 6958)
Claremont, clear last for most of 1969, move to the top as they reveal major problems in Perth's attack – which scores only 2.6 (18) while attacking for all of the last quarter.; Mal Brown's control at centre half-forward allows an inaccurate East Perth to recover top form, kicking 9.15 (69) to 3.8 (26) in wet conditions against the WANFL's new "glamour" club.

=== Round 8 (Foundation Day) ===
	Round 8
Saturday, 30 May (2:15 pm)	Subiaco 12.10 (82)	def.	East Perth 7.22 (64)	Subiaco Oval (crowd: 11193)
Saturday, 30 May (2:15 pm)	West Perth 10.13 (73)	def.	Claremont 6.12 (48)	Leederville Oval (crowd: 8661)
Monday, 1 June (2:15 pm)	South Fremantle 8.9 (57)	def. by	Perth 9.17 (71)	Fremantle Oval (crowd: 11660)
Monday, 1 June (2:15 pm)	Swan Districts 19.19 (133)	def.	East Fremantle 13.11 (89)	Bassendean Oval (crowd: 5927)
Farmer and Dempsey show top form for the first time in 1970 to knock off Claremont in very wet and heavy conditions, as the Tigers' lack of strength and finesse allows the team just two goals over three quarters.; Improved physical strength and six goals from Max George allows the brilliant Walker to life his Swan Districts team from bottom with a remarkable attacking display in the wet conditions. Peter Manning's speed on the wing is a highlight.

=== Round 9 ===
	Round 9
Saturday, 6 June (2:15 pm)	Subiaco 17.15 (117)	def.	West Perth 14.25 (109)	Subiaco Oval (crowd: 13565)
Saturday, 6 June (2:15 pm)	Perth 21.18 (144)	def.	Swan Districts 9.2 (56)	Lathlain Park (crowd: 7682)
Saturday, 6 June (2:15 pm)	Claremont 19.9 (123)	def.	East Perth 17.16 (118)	Claremont Oval (crowd: 10882)
Saturday, 6 June (2:15 pm)	South Fremantle 17.13 (115)	def.	East Fremantle 8.19 (67)	Fremantle Oval (crowd: 8357)
Dennis Marshall's fierce application leads Claremont from a desultory first half to an exciting victory when East Perth's Dorrington misses a shot after the siren to draw the match.; Perth's centreline control destroys the power Swan Districts showed the week before – Brehaut thrashes Manning – and veteran Gerry Iseger, who kicked 0.7 the week before, reverse that with a 6.1 (37) tally duplicated by skipper Pat Astone.

=== Round 10 ===
	Round 10
Saturday, 13 June (2:15 pm)	South Fremantle 18.26 (134)	def.	Swan Districts 5.10 (40)	Fremantle Oval (crowd: 5792)
Saturday, 13 June (2:15 pm)	West Perth 12.10 (82)	def. by	East Perth 15.14 (104)	Leederville Oval (crowd: 10359)
Saturday, 13 June (2:15 pm)	Subiaco 10.13 (73)	def.	Claremont 9.16 (70)	Subiaco Oval (crowd: 10782)
Saturday, 13 June (2:15 pm)	Perth 14.15 (99)	def.	East Fremantle 10.9 (69)	Lathlain Park (crowd: 5469)
West Perth, without Farmer and Dempsey on state duty, and only seventeen fit players after half-time, fall to two games below fourth as their forwards fail to capitalise on Mel Whinnen's dominance.

=== Round 11 ===
	Round 11
Saturday, 20 June (2:15 pm)	Swan Districts 12.13 (85)	def. by	Subiaco 20.20 (140)	Bassendean Oval (crowd: 5590)
Saturday, 20 June (2:15 pm)	East Perth 16.7 (103)	def.	Perth 11.14 (80)	Perth Oval (crowd: 12333)
Saturday, 20 June (2:15 pm)	Claremont 27.20 (182)	def.	South Fremantle 16.8 (104)	Claremont Oval (crowd: 11867)
Saturday, 20 June (2:15 pm)	East Fremantle 11.10 (76)	def. by	West Perth 15.10 (100)	East Fremantle Oval (crowd: 6152)
Claremont's brilliant attack – 25.14 (164) in the final three quarters – surprises the Bulldogs as Moss and Harvey outplay South Fremantle's recognised strength in the ruck.; Despite a nine-goal burst in the third quarter, Old Easts still play without nearly enough consistency to break through for their first victory since opening day.; 1973 premiership hero Keith Watt makes an impressive debut for Subiaco, countering doubts the league leaders lack adequate roving depth to support their 33-year-old captain-coach.

=== Round 12 ===
	Round 12
Saturday, 27 June (2:15 pm)	South Fremantle 11.18 (84)	def.	Subiaco 9.8 (62)	Fremantle Oval (crowd: 8891)
Saturday, 27 June (2:15 pm)	West Perth 4.8 (32)	def. by	Perth 16.18 (114)	Leederville Oval (crowd: 8854)
Saturday, 27 June (2:15 pm)	East Perth 21.18 (144)	def.	Swan Districts 8.8 (56)	Perth Oval (crowd: 6815)
Saturday, 27 June (2:15 pm)	Claremont 8.17 (65)	def.	East Fremantle 7.9 (51)	Claremont Oval (crowd: 6025)
West Perth's score, besides being the lowest of the season, was at the time their lowest against Perth since 3.4 (22) in 1918; indeed the Cardinals had kicked only two lower scores since 1921. The Cardinals scored only 0.2 (2) at one end in dry if windy conditions despite Perth having only three rainless days during June.; "Hassa" Mann's relegation of five top players pays off as the youngsters rise to the occasion, whilst playing all eighteen players on the backline during the last quarter pays off as Subiaco cannot score with a howling wind for seventeen minutes.

=== Round 13 ===
	Round 13
Saturday, 4 July (2:15 pm)	West Perth 9.15 (69)	def. by	South Fremantle 14.5 (89)	Leederville Oval (crowd: 10297)
Saturday, 4 July (2:15 pm)	Perth 17.19 (121)	def.	Subiaco 15.12 (102)	Lathlain Park (crowd: 11165)
Saturday, 4 July (2:15 pm)	Swan Districts 13.16 (94)	def. by	Claremont 16.15 (111)	Bassendean Oval (crowd: 5681)
Saturday, 4 July (2:15 pm)	East Fremantle 8.9 (57)	def. by	East Perth 16.14 (110)	East Fremantle Oval (crowd: 7086)
With Farmer and Dempsey back in form, West Perth hold South Fremantle scoreless in the opening quarter, but the Cardinals' lack of good forwards proves decisive afterwards.

=== Round 14 ===
	Round 14
Saturday, 11 July (2:15 pm)	Swan Districts 18.21 (129)	def.	West Perth 12.10 (82)	Bassendean Oval (crowd: 6867)
Saturday, 11 July (2:15 pm)	South Fremantle 17.14 (116)	def.	East Perth 16.12 (108)	Fremantle Oval (crowd: 14500)
Saturday, 11 July (2:15 pm)	Claremont 12.16 (88)	def. by	Perth 20.11 (131)	Claremont Oval (crowd: 11984)
Saturday, 11 July (2:15 pm)	Subiaco 22.15 (147)	def.	East Fremantle 12.14 (86)	Subiaco Oval (crowd: 6934)
Perth's tough defence, led by youngsters Quartermaine, Mal Day, Colin Lofts and Mick Ray, overpowers Claremont to place the Tigers' second position and finals double chance in danger owing to Claremont's poor percentage.; With their defeat by Subiaco, East Fremantle equal their 1968 record of thirteen consecutive defeats, despite the Maroons easing up after an irresistible opening half.

=== Interstate match ===
Western Australia v South Australia
Saturday, 20 July	Western Australia	def.	South Australia	Subiaco Oval (crowd: 32,250)
2.2 (14); 7.8 (50); 9.15 (69); 12.17 (89)	Q1; Q2; Q3; Final	3.2 (20); 5.5 (35); 9.7 (61); 13.7 (85)	Umpires: Jack Crouch; Simpson Medal: Alan Stiles (Western Australia)
Robertson 5.4; Mann 3.2; Smeath 1.3; Moss 1.1; Young, Manning 1.0; Marshall 0.3; Dempsey, Bob Page, Cooper 0.1	Goals	5.2 Fred Phillis; 3.0 Tilbrook; 2.1 von Bertouch; 1.1 Marker, Huppatz, Wayne Phillis
Stiles, Young, Marshall, Dempsey, Bob Page, Millson	Best	McKellar, Robert Day, Ottens, Huppatz, Wayne Phillis, Fred Phillis
Reilly (pulled thigh muscle)	Injuries	Robert Day (cramp)
Western Australia's speed on the wings allows it to win a drab and unexciting match, whose margin should have been wider since a late goal awarded to Wayne Phillis was clearly a behind according to replays. "Polly" Farmer played with a major ankle problem.

=== Round 15 ===
	Round 15
Saturday, 25 July (2:15 pm)	Perth 12.15 (87)	def.	South Fremantle 7.18 (60)	Lathlain Park (crowd: 9218)
Saturday, 25 July (2:15 pm)	East Perth 13.11 (89)	def.	Subiaco 7.10 (52)	Perth Oval (crowd: 10238)
Saturday, 25 July (2:15 pm)	West Perth 13.9 (87)	def.	Claremont 5.12 (42)	Leederville Oval (crowd: 5854)
Saturday, 25 July (2:15 pm)	East Fremantle 21.16 (142)	def.	Swan Districts 9.18 (72)	East Fremantle Oval (crowd: 4338)
East Perth's centreline dominance allows it to crush Subiaco in slippery conditions despite a solo six-goal hand from Austin Robertson – and positions the Royals to re-enter the four. East Perth's on-ball dominance was such they could overcome the effect on their forward line of losing Mal Brown and deputy centre-half-forward Ian Thomson.; Claremont's inability to move the ball from the packs in muddy conditions leaves it very vulnerable as West Perth – led by debutant Shane Sheridan – rebound from their poor display at Bassendean.

=== Round 16 ===
	Round 16
Saturday, 1 August (2:15 pm)	West Perth 13.17 (95)	def.	Subiaco 5.8 (38)	Leederville Oval (crowd: 9549)
Saturday, 1 August (2:15 pm)	Swan Districts 17.10 (112)	def. by	Perth 18.10 (118)	Bassendean Oval (crowd: 5553)
Saturday, 1 August (2:15 pm)	Claremont 16.12 (108)	def. by	East Perth 17.11 (113)	Claremont Oval (crowd: 11428)
Saturday, 1 August (2:15 pm)	East Fremantle 15.14 (104)	def. by	South Fremantle 20.10 (130)	East Fremantle Oval (crowd: 8927)
The loss of Peter Burton to a long-term injury leaves Subiaco terribly weak in the ruck, whilst the recovered Astbury decimates the Maroon attack from centre-half-back – resulting in the early flag favourites being poised to miss the finals altogether.; Claremont just fail to remain in the four after coming back from fifty-one points behind late in the third quarter, despite a losing on-ball division without Duperouzel.; Leaders Perth and South Fremantle struggle against the two tailenders but are saved by moving Graham Edwards (eleven goals) and Graham Scott (ten) respective to cover weaknesses in the critical full forward position.

=== Round 17 ===
	Round 17
Saturday, 8 August (2:15 pm)	South Fremantle 15.10 (100)	def.	West Perth 14.10 (94)	Fremantle Oval (crowd: 10774)
Saturday, 8 August (2:15 pm)	Subiaco 17.2 (104)	def. by	Perth 21.22 (148)	Subiaco Oval (crowd: 9325)
Saturday, 8 August (2:15 pm)	Claremont 20.12 (132)	def.	Swan Districts 16.21 (117)	Claremont Oval (crowd: 6408)
Saturday, 8 August (2:15 pm)	East Perth 18.22 (130)	def.	East Fremantle 8.6 (54)	Perth Oval (crowd: 7413)
Subiaco kick the most accurate score in WANFL history, with over 89 percent of scoring shots successful.; The Maroons do not score a behind between the midpoint of the first quarter and a miss by Mick Malone one minute from the finish, scoring 15 unbroken goals to be an astonishing 17.1 (103).; Nonetheless, Subiaco were completely outplayed by the top-of-the-ladder Demons, who exploit their ruck weakness to score 15.14 (104) to 4.0 (24) in 2 1/2 quarters to the final change.

=== Round 18 ===
	Round 18
Saturday, 15 August (2:15 pm)	Swan Districts 19.8 (122)	def.	Subiaco 15.14 (104)	Bassendean Oval (crowd: 7918)
Saturday, 15 August (2:15 pm)	Perth 14.16 (100)	def.	East Perth 10.9 (69)	Lathlain Park (crowd: 16443)
Saturday, 15 August (2:15 pm)	South Fremantle 21.13 (139)	def. by	Claremont 26.14 (170)	Fremantle Oval (crowd: 13437)
Saturday, 15 August (2:15 pm)	West Perth 17.19 (121)	def.	East Fremantle 15.9 (99)	Leederville Oval (crowd: 4991)
South Fremantle kicked the highest losing score in WANFL history to that point, beating the Tigers' 21.12 (138) from 1960. The 309-point aggregate score was also a record, beating 303 points by East Fremantle and Claremont from 1948.; Subiaco lose their sixth match in seven to tailender Swans – and must win every game to have a chance of playing finals. Swan Districts' skill and play-on style is never countered by the flagging Maroons.

=== Round 19 ===
	Round 19
Saturday, 22 August (2:15 pm)	Subiaco 15.18 (108)	def.	South Fremantle 14.17 (101)	Subiaco Oval (crowd: 10629)
Saturday, 22 August (2:15 pm)	Perth 14.10 (94)	def.	West Perth 11.10 (76)	Lathlain Park (crowd: 9289)
Saturday, 22 August (2:15 pm)	East Perth 18.16 (124)	def.	Swan Districts 14.17 (101)	Perth Oval (crowd: 10100)
Saturday, 22 August (2:15 pm)	East Fremantle 19.24 (138)	def.	Claremont 13.10 (88)	East Fremantle Oval (crowd: 7194)
Claremont, taking victory for granted against an Old Easts team faced with a first wooden spoon since its debut season of 1898, (Note: East Fremantle were not to suffer another wooden spoon after their debut until 2004, but did so again just two seasons later in 2006.) and are only briefly in the match after the blue and whites burst away early in the second quarter. Future VFL star "Whale" Roberts dominates the ruck for Old Easts.; With youngster and future Carlton star Fitzpatrick finally covering for Burton, Subiaco end their horror run and not face a battle with Claremont for the last place in the finals.

=== Round 20 ===
	Round 20
Saturday, 29 August (2:15 pm)	Swan Districts 10.13 (73)	def. by	South Fremantle 15.21 (111)	Bassendean Oval (crowd: 8987)
Saturday, 29 August (2:15 pm)	East Perth 16.10 (106)	def. by	West Perth 17.11 (113)	Perth Oval (crowd: 10892)
Saturday, 29 August (2:15 pm)	Claremont 11.14 (80)	def. by	Subiaco 16.16 (112)	Claremont Oval (crowd: 15252)
Saturday, 29 August (2:15 pm)	East Fremantle 14.16 (100)	def.	Perth 12.11 (83)	East Fremantle Oval (crowd: 6822)
After an even first half, George Young, Cam Blakemore and Peter Metropolis take the match over, kicking eight of the Maroons' ten second half goals and dominating general play on the ball. The result leaves Claremont to beat top team Perth and hope Old Easts can continue their recent form to remain in the four.

=== Round 21 ===
	Round 21
Saturday, 5 September (2:15 pm)	West Perth 18.16 (124)	def.	Swan Districts 10.7 (67)	Leederville Oval (crowd: 6344)
Saturday, 5 September (2:15 pm)	South Fremantle 24.17 (161)	def.	East Perth 18.14 (122)	Fremantle Oval (crowd: 17836)
Saturday, 5 September (2:15 pm)	Perth 19.26 (140)	def.	Claremont 11.8 (74)	Lathlain Park (crowd: 11488)
Saturday, 5 September (2:15 pm)	Subiaco 18.13 (121)	def.	East Fremantle 15.14 (104)	Subiaco Oval (crowd: 9570)
East Perth are nonplussed by South Fremantle's swift ball movement that produces fifteen goals in the first half of a match that would determine the double chance – leaving the Royals fourth and faced with a long injury list.; Perth rebound from their upset loss to East Fremantle as, despite inaccuracy, the Tigers cannot counter Perth's ability to get the ball constantly from the centre.; After being reported for striking Mick Fitzpatrick (but cleared on the Tuesday tribunal hearing), East Fremantle fullback Trevor Sprigg claims he was hit by a teenage boy as he left the field.

== Ladder ==
1970 WANFL ladder
Pos	Team	Pld	W	L	D	PF	PA	PP	Pts
1	Perth	21	15	6	0	2210	1746	126.6	60
2	South Fremantle (P)	21	14	7	0	2293	2085	110.0	56
3	Subiaco	21	13	8	0	2205	2008	109.8	52
4	East Perth	21	12	9	0	2306	2006	115.0	48
5	Claremont	21	12	9	0	2233	2196	101.7	48
6	West Perth	21	10	11	0	1969	1863	105.7	40
7	East Fremantle	21	4	17	0	1907	2404	79.3	16
8	Swan Districts	21	4	17	0	1881	2696	69.8	16

Rules for classification: 1) points; 2) percentage; 3) number of points for.
(P) Premiers

== Finals ==
=== First semi-final ===
	First semi-final
Saturday, 12 September (2:15 pm)	Subiaco 10.6 (66)	def. by	East Perth 17.14 (116)	Subiaco Oval (crowd: 29,060)
Poor tactics by Subiaco – including playing an unfit Bunton together with Watt on the ball and constantly kicking too high in the air – leave the depleted Royals with a very easy win and no injuries form the game.

=== Second semi-final ===
	Second semi-final
Saturday, 19 September (2:15 pm)	Perth 12.12 (84)	def. by	South Fremantle 12.16 (88)	Subiaco Oval (crowd: 28,771)
South Fremantle end a record 11-game losing streak against Perth to enter their first Grand Final since 1956. The Bulldogs' resolution after a woefully inaccurate first quarter yielding 2.12 (24) allowed them to hold out Perth in a controversial finish where Perth forward Pat Astone was denied a mark to boos from the crowd.

=== Preliminary final ===
	Preliminary final
Saturday, 26 September (2:15 pm)	Perth 16.18 (114)	def.	East Perth 16.14 (110)	Subiaco Oval (crowd: 27,400)
Perth's tired finish – it just held on after leading by thirty-five points at three-quarter time – raises doubts over its Grand Final prospects on the back of two very tough games.

=== Grand Final ===
1970 WANFL Grand Final
Saturday, 3 October	South Fremantle	def.	Perth	Subiaco Oval (crowd: 40,620)
5.3 (33); 8.3 (51); 13.5 (83); 15.7 (97)	Q1; Q2; Q3; Final	1.5 (11); 5.10 (40); 5.14 (44); 6.18 (54)	Umpires: Ray Montgomery; Simpson Medal: Brian Ciccotosto (South Fremantle)
Ciccotosto 4, Scott 4, Clark 2, Dougan 2, Mann, Troode, Ryan	Goals	Shields 3, Stiles 2, Wilson
Ciccotosto, Civich, Grljusich, Haddow, Dennis, G. Reilly	Best	Wilson, Miller, Lofts, Shields, Ray, Day
Daw (concussion)	Injuries
In very wet conditions, South Fremantle take advantage of Perth's woeful inaccuracy in the first half to win their first premiership for sixteen years with some ease.
