= Doug Oliphant =

Australian rules footballer

Personal information
- Full name: Douglas Oliphant
- Born: 29 January 1911; Boulder, Western Australia
- Died: 3 March 1999 (aged 88)
- Height: 179 cm (5 ft 10 in)
- Weight: 86 kg (190 lb)

Playing career^{1}
Years	Club	Games (Goals)
1927–1940, 1945	Perth	224 (383)
1942	Fitzroy	7 (11)
Total		231 (394)
- ^{1} Playing statistics correct to the end of 1945.

Douglas Oliphant (29 January 1911 – 3 March 1999) was an Australian rules footballer who played with Perth in the Western Australian National Football League (WANFL) and Fitzroy in the Victorian Football League (VFL).

Oliphant had a decorated career at Perth, culminating in him being named as a follower in the club's official Team of the Century. Also used as a key forward, he was Perth's leading goal-kicker on four occasions, in 1930, 1931, 1932 and 1940. His 84 goals in 1931 was also enough to top the league's goal-kicking. Oliphant won two best and fairests for Perth and was runner up in the 1936 Sandover Medal, to George Moloney. He also represented Western Australia at interstate football on six occasions.

After captaining Perth in 1940, Oliphant spent the 1941 season as playing coach of Kalgoorlie City in the Goldfields National Football League and steered the club to a premiership. He was then transferred to Melbourne due to his work in the military and made seven appearances for Fitzroy in the 1942 VFL season.
