= 1907 WAFL season =

Australian rules football season

- Teams: 8
- Premiers: Perth; 1st premiership
- Minor premiers: East Fremantle; 5th minor premiership

The 1907 WAFL season was the 23rd season of senior Australian rules football in Perth, Western Australia. It was the league's first season under the name West Australian Football League, having changed from West Australian Football Association in March 1907.

The premiership was won by Perth, after it won a controversial grand final against East Fremantle on protest by one point, after initially losing the match by five points. It was Perth's first premiership.

== Ladder ==
1907 ladder
Pos	Team	Pld	W	L	D	PF	PA	PP	Pts
1	East Fremantle	17	14	3	0	895	549	163.0	56
2	Perth (P)	17	14	3	0	778	505	154.1	56
3	West Perth	17	12	5	0	891	617	144.4	48
4	South Fremantle	17	10	7	0	804	626	128.4	40
5	North Fremantle	17	7	10	0	661	715	92.4	28
6	East Perth	17	7	10	0	632	712	88.8	28
7	Midland Junction	17	2	15	0	519	925	56.1	8
8	Subiaco	17	2	15	0	485	1016	47.7	8

Source: WAFL Footy Facts
Rules for classification: 1) points; 2) percentage; 3) number of points for.
(P) Premiers

== Grand final ==
1907 WAFL Grand Final
Saturday, 28 September	Perth	def.	East Fremantle	Showgrounds
1.1 (7); 3.4 (22); 3.6 (24); 6.6 (42)	Q1; Q2; Q3; Final	0.4 (4); 1.4 (10); 4.8 (32); 5.11 (41)	Umpires: Ivo Crapp
