= Frank Walker (Australian rules footballer) =

Australian rules footballer

Personal information
- Full name: Francis Patrick Walker
- Born: 10 September 1933
- Original team: South Perth Mets

Playing career^{1}
Years	Club	Games (Goals)
1952–1964	Perth	226 (410)
- ^{1} Playing statistics correct to the end of 1964.

Francis Patrick Walker (born 10 September 1933) is a retired Australian rules footballer who played for Perth Football Club in the West Australian Football League (WAFL), and also represented Western Australia.

Walker was educated at Aquinas College in Salter Point, where he was mentored in football by Jerry Dolan. He was also playing club football for South Perth under East Perth great Mick Cronin.

Walker trained with East Perth in 1951, even attending a trip to Collie with them and playing a scratch match against South Fremantle. He was living with his grandparents in South Perth, whilst his father was living in Cannington. South Perth was within the recruiting boundary of Perth, whilst Cannington was unallocated, East Perth tried to sign him up as living with his father, they sent the request off amongst other paperwork, hoping the address anomaly would go unnoticed. Mistakenly sent early, Perth officials obtained it.

Jack O'Dea of Perth signed Walker just before the start of the 1952 season. He played two games in the seconds before making his debut against West Perth.

He won the best and fairest for Perth in 1955 and 1956, runner-up in his last full season in 1963. He topped the club's goal kicking in 1953, his record of 410 goals one of the highest on Perth's all-time goalkickers list.

He made his debut for Western Australia against Victoria at the MCG in 1955, kicking two of their three goals for the game. He represented Western Australia ten times.

In 1961, he was assistant coach to Bob Miller. Miller was sacked early in the season, Walker was elevated to the coaching position, but on the insistence of the club, he was a non-playing coach, meaning Walker did not play until 1962, when he was made assistant to Ern Henfry. In 1964, Walker retired after 226 games.

He was nicknamed "Dickie" because his father and grandfather were also named Frank.
