= Ron Tucker =

Australian rules footballer

Personal information
- Full name: Ronald Douglas Tucker
- Born: 30 June 1921; Subiaco, Western Australia
- Died: 10 April 1986 (aged 64); Perth, Western Australia
- Height: 185 cm (6 ft 1 in)
- Weight: 79 kg (174 lb)
- Positions: Centre half-forward Centre half-back Rover

Playing career^{1}
Years	Club	Games (Goals)
1940–51, 1953–55	Perth	197 (738)
1952	Subiaco	18 (65)
Total		215 (803)

Representative team honours
Years	Team	Games (Goals)
1947–50	Western Australia	14 (32)
- ^{1} Playing statistics correct to the end of 1955.

Career highlights
- Perth leading goalkicker 1941, 1946, 1947, 1948, 1949, 1950, 1953, 1954, 1955; WANFL leading goalkicker 1950; Subiaco leading goalkicker 1952; Perth Team of the Century (named 1998); West Australian Football Hall of Fame (inductee 2009)

Ronald Douglas Tucker (30 June 1921 – 10 April 1986) was an Australian rules footballer who played for Perth and Subiaco in the Western Australian National Football League (WANFL). Playing in a number of positions, though primarily at centre half-forward, Tucker kicked a total of 803 goals in 215 WANFL games between 1940 and 1955, and 32 goals in 14 games for Western Australia in interstate matches. Tucker was named in Perth's Team of the Century in 1998, and was inducted into the West Australian Football Hall of Fame in 2009.

== Career ==
Born to William Henry Tucker and Annie Florence Lee on 30 June 1921 at King Edward Memorial Hospital in Subiaco, Western Australia, Tucker made his debut for Perth in 1940, and was their leading goalkicker in 1941 with 44 goals. He served as a driver in the 52 Australian Transport Platoon during World War II, and also played army football. He was also a noted athlete, winning the Northern Territory 120 yds. hurdles championship in 1944, and the New Britain 200 yds. championship in 1945. Tucker returned to Perth for the 1946 season. Tucker played in losing Grand Finals in both 1949, against West Perth, and 1950, against South Fremantle. Tucker kicked 115 goals in 1950 to be the WANFL's leading goalkicker, which is a Perth record. After a run of poor form for Perth, which resulted in him being switched to centre half-back for the latter half of the 1951 season, Tucker transferred to Subiaco for the 1952 season. In 18 games at the club, playing either as a goalsneak or as a follower, he kicked 65 goals to lead the club's goalkicking. He transferred back to Perth for the 1953 season, and returned to form, kicking 87 goals. He again led the club's goalkicking in 1954 and 1955, with 44 and 52 goals in each respective season, but was dropped to the reserves several times. Tucker was unavailable for Perth's premiership win over East Fremantle in 1955 after injuring his knee in the preliminary final, and retired at the end of the season.

Tucker died at Royal Perth Hospital on 10 April 1986, and was buried at Karrakatta Cemetery. In 1999, he was named at centre half-forward in Perth's Team of Century, and was posthumously inducted into the West Australian Football Hall of Fame in 2009.

== Reputation ==
Tucker was considered the equal of leading full-forwards such as Bernie Naylor and John Coleman, and was considered superior to Naylor at ground level. Tucker played at either centre half-forward or full-forward in every interstate and carnival match for the WANFL between 1947 and 1950, kicking 32 goals.
