= Billy Orr (footballer) =

Australian rules footballer

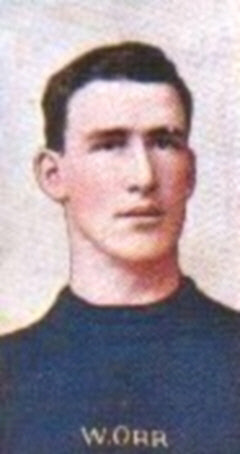
- Cigarette card of Orr

Personal information
- Full name: William Richard Orr
- Born: 17 May 1883; Sale, Victoria
- Died: 6 June 1963 (aged 80); Perth, Western Australia
- Original team: Sale
- Height: 175 cm (5 ft 9 in)
- Weight: 61 kg (134 lb)

Playing career^{1}
Years	Club	Games (Goals)
1903	Carlton	1 (0)
1904–1905	North Fremantle	32 (-)
1906–1911	Perth	85 (52)
1912–13, 1916	Subiaco	41 (-)
- ^{1} Playing statistics correct to the end of 1916.

William Richard Orr (17 May 1883 – 6 June 1963) was an Australian rules footballer who played with Carlton in the Victorian Football League (VFL). He also played for North Fremantle, Perth and Subiaco in the West Australian Football League (WAFL).
