= George Doig =

Australian rules footballer, born 1913

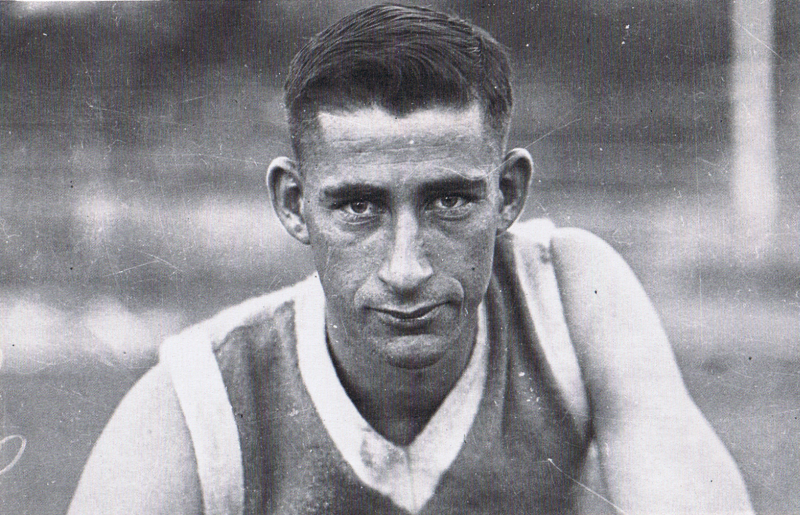

Personal information
- Full name: George Ronald Doig
- Born: 25 May 1913; Fremantle, Western Australia
- Died: 27 November 2006 (aged 93); Bicton, Western Australia
- Original team: East Fremantle (FSFA)
- Height: 173 cm (5 ft 8 in)
- Weight: 66 kg (146 lb)
- Position: Full-forward

Playing career^{1}
Years	Club	Games (Goals)
1933–1945	East Fremantle	202 (1096)

Representative team honours^{2}
Years	Team	Games (Goals)
1934–1939	Western Australia	14 (63)

Coaching career^{3}
Years	Club	Games (W–L–D)
1940	East Fremantle	22 (15–6–1)
- ^{1} Playing statistics correct to the end of 1945.^{2} Representative statistics correct as of 1939.^{3} Coaching statistics correct as of 1940.

Career highlights
- 3× WANFL Premiership player: (1933, 1937, 1945); 6× WANFL Leading goalkicker: (1933, 1934, 1935, 1936, 1937, 1941); East Fremantle leading goalkicker 1933–41; East Fremantle captain 1940–41; East Fremantle life member (1949); Fremantle Football Hall of Legends (1995); East Fremantle Team of the Century (1997); The West Australian Team of the Century (2000); Australian Football Hall of Fame, inducted 2002; West Australian Football Hall of Fame, inaugural Legend 2004

George Ronald Doig (25 May 1913 – 27 November 2006) was an Australian rules footballer who played for and later coached the East Fremantle Football Club in the Western Australian National Football League (WANFL). A member of the Doig sporting family, Doig kicked 1096 goals from his 202 games, playing almost exclusively as a forward, becoming East Fremantle's leading goalkicker of all-time, and leading the WANFL's goalkicking on six occasions. He kicked more than 100 goals in a season nine times, which included a haul of 152 goals in 1934 that set an elite record which was not broken until Bernie Naylor (South Fremantle) kicked 167 goals in 1953. Doig captained the club for two seasons, from 1940 to 1941, also filling the role of coach during the first season.

Doig also represented the Western Australian state side in 14 matches, kicking 63 goals. He was inducted into the Australian Football Hall of Fame in 2002, and was named as a "Legend" in the West Australian Football Hall of Fame in 2004. Doig was named at full forward in East Fremantle's Team of the Century, and the Fremantle Football Hall of Legends.

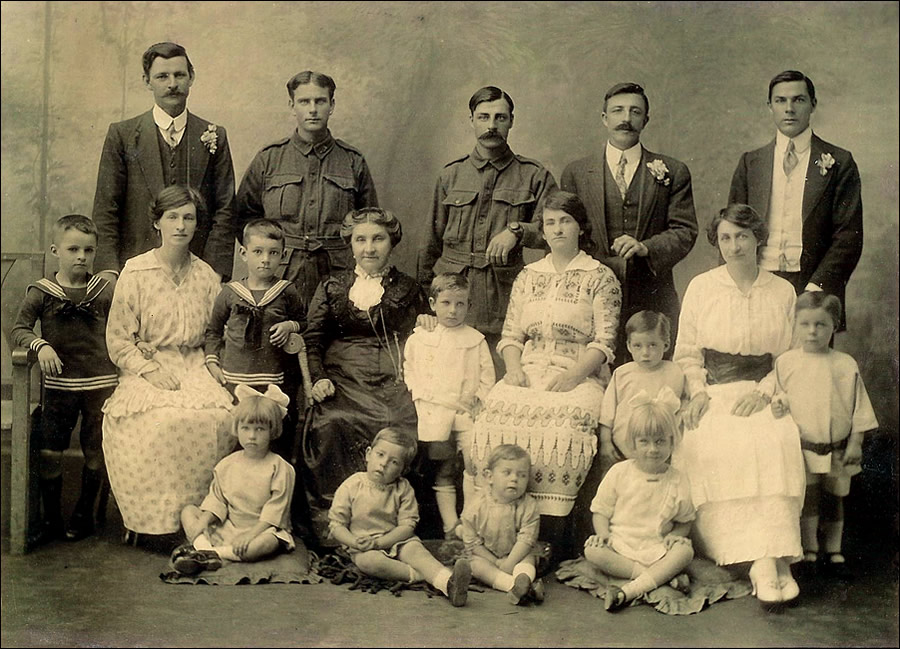
A photograph of the Doig family taken in 1915, with George Doig middle row, third from right.

== Early life ==
Doig was born on 25 May 1913 to Charles George Alexander Doig and his wife, Isabella Brand Doig (née Miller), at their residence at 30 Howard Street, Fremantle. Doig was a member of the Doig sporting family which produced 17 WAFL footballers. His father, Charles Doig, Sr., played 209 games for East Fremantle between 1903 and 1921, and later coached the club for one season, in 1940. His brother, Charles Doig, Jr., played 196 games for East Fremantle and also captained the club.

Doig attended Fremantle Boys' School in Fremantle, but played "little football" at school. In 1931, Doig played for an East Fremantle side in the Fremantle Suburban Football Association, a local competition. Despite his team finishing second from last, Doig kicked 126 goals from 20 games to lead the competition's goalkicking. In a 1954 interview, Doig characterised himself as part of the "barefoot brigade". In one match against Palmyra at Fremantle Park, Doig kicked his team's entire score, 26 goals and 20 behinds, to Palmyra's seven goals and seven behinds. The Sunday Times noted it as "a splendid performance". The following season, Doig played with East Fremantle's affiliate in the Western Australian National Football Association (WANFA), which acted as a reserve or seconds team for the WANFL club.

== Football career ==
In 1933, Doig was promoted to the League team at East Fremantle. In his first game, he kicked 9 goals. For the season he kicked 106 goals, the first person in the West Australian Football League to kick more than 100 goals in a season at League level. The following year, he kicked 152 goals, which was an Australian record until 1953, when Bernie Naylor, from the South Fremantle Football Club kicked 167 goals (including finals matches).^{[a]} In the 1934 season Doig kicked 19 goals 3 behinds in one match (then an Australian record) followed by 13 goals 4 behinds in the next match.

In 1935, George kicked 113 goals, followed by

108 goals in 1936,
144 goals in 1937,
100 goals in 1938,
106 goals in 1939,
108 goals in 1940, and
146 goals in 1941.

Due to the Second World War, 1941 practically marked his retirement from football. In 1945, at the request of the committee, Doig returned to play eight games; he kicked 23 goals, and helped East Fremantle win the Premiership.

During his career he played in eight Grand Finals, and kicked ten or more goals on 14 occasions. Only once in his 202 matches, against Swan Districts in the third round of 1938, did he fail to score a goal.

In 1938, the East Fremantle Football Club played a match in Sydney against the New South Wales State team. A newspaper report on the match referred to George Doig as "the Don Bradman of WANFL football" as he had by then achieved more than 100 goals in six consecutive seasons.

Doig kicked an aggregate of 1072 goals in his nine consecutive seasons from 1933 to 1941 with East Fremantle. This represents 119 goals per season, and 5.53 goals per game. With his 1945 return, after an absence from the game for three years due to the Second World War, he played 202 games and kicked 1095 goals, the seventh-highest total in elite Australian rules football. Doig also represented Western Australia on fourteen occasions and kicked 62 goals in interstate matches. If these are included, he played 216 senior career matches and kicked 1157 senior career goals, the seventh-highest total in elite Australian rules football.

Fremantle's best and fairest award, the Doig Medal, is named for the Doig family, 17 of which have played football at senior level in Western Australia over three generations. A function room at Subiaco Oval has been named the Doig Room in recognition of the family's influence on West Australian football. He is a member of the West Australian Football Hall of Fame and has legend status.

Doig married Margaret Jean Mossman on Saturday, 21 August 1937, at the Old Scots Church in Fremantle. He and his brother, Charlie Doig, who acted as best man, had both played for East Fremantle against Swan Districts at Fremantle Oval on the same day as the wedding, with George kicking four goals in a 27-point loss.

=== 1941–1945: "Four figures" and retirement ===
Despite taking the club to a preliminary final as playing coach the previous season, Doig was unavailable to coach in 1941. After two years coaching the Aquinas College football team, former East Fremantle player and coach Jerry Dolan was appointed non-playing coach of East Fremantle. At a club meeting on 9 April, Doig was re-elected captain for the 1941 season. He was also elected as one of two players' representatives to the general committee, along with R. Daniel.

Doig kicked his 1000th career goal against Claremont at Fremantle Oval on Saturday, 5 July 1941, becoming the fourth player in the "Big Three" football leagues (the South Australian National Football League, the Victorian Football League, and the WANFL) to reach this mark, after Gordon Coventry (Collingwood), Ken Farmer (North Adelaide), and Ted Tyson (West Perth). Doig had started the match with 998 goals to his credit, and nine minutes after the start of play, had scored the two goals required to reach the milestone. The 1000th goal itself was reached with what The Sunday Times called a "well judged snap shot", and was followed by "[s]ustained cheering and hand clapping", with the game being "momentarily held up while players rushed to congratulate him".

For the ninth consecutive season, Doig kicked a century of goals, 146 in total, to again lead East Fremantle's goalkicking. He also led the WANFL's goalkicking, for the first time since 1937, which marked the sixth time he had filled this role, a record not equalled until 1954, by Bernie Naylor, and not broken until 1971, by Austin Robertson, Jr., who led the league's goalkicking a total of eight times.

At the conclusion of the 1941 season, the WANFL voted to restrict the competition to players under the age of 18, to allow fit men to enlist in the military. This limit was in place for three seasons, from 1942 to 1944. During this period, Doig, having turned 30 in 1943, was too old to enlist, and continued working at his job with the Harbour and Light Department. After much criticism, and several proposals to restrict the competition to players under the age of 25, the WANFL was returned to an "open" competition for the 1945 season. After three years' absence, Doig announced his desire to return to the game, if his club needed him. He returned to football in round 14 of the 1945 season, against East Perth at Fremantle Oval, kicking seven goals. The West Australian reported he had "lost little if any of his former skill":

To all appearances Doig was the Doig of old, and although consistently fed by his followers and half-forwards it was he who made the leads with pacy breakaways from the opposing full-back to chest mark and kick the goals. Only once did Doig mark out of easy range and then he was equal to the distance with a long punt from the hospital wing that found the right opening. [...] Doig's methods in getting the ball are so effective and yet so simple that it is remarkable that more forwards here do not emulate his style. The main reason for his success is the speed with which he gets off the mark to give the lead, often from a purposely flat-footed start to trick his opponent. Whether he moves right, left, or forward Doig has a perfect understanding with his teammates, who, in turn, unselfishly do everything to get the ball to him.

— The West Australian, Thursday, 9 August 1945, p. 2.

At the conclusion of the home-and-away season,^{[b]} East Fremantle finished on top of the ladder, with 16 wins and four losses from their 20 games. The club won their last eight games to set up a semi-final against West Perth, which the club won by 52 points. In the derby grand final against South Fremantle at Subiaco Oval the following week, East Fremantle won by 36 points in front of a crowd of 21,000 people.

== Post-playing life ==
After his retirement from football, Doig continued with the Harbour and Light Department at Fremantle Harbour, where he worked until his retirement in 1973. After his retirement, he enjoyed a number of recreational pursuits, including lawn bowls, fishing, which included occasional trips to Kalbarri. In 1967, he joined the Royal Fremantle Golf Club, later shooting a hole in one. In 1988, he underwent open heart surgery. Doig died at his home in Bicton on 27 November 2006, at the age of 93.

== Reputation and awards ==
A 1948 history of the East Fremantle Football Club, The Jubilee Book of the East Fremantle Football Club, written by Dolph Heinrichs, a former East Fremantle player, called Doig the "Bradman of W.A. football", on account of his goal-kicking feats.^{[c]} After a tour of Sydney by East Fremantle in 1938, a Sydney newspaper had called him the "Bradman of Australian rules football", further embellishing his reputation. However, several other footballers were also referred to by this term, notably Ken Farmer, another full-forward, and Haydn Bunton, a rover.

Doig was made a life member of the East Fremantle Football Club at a club reunion held at the Fremantle Town Hall in February 1949. Jerry Dolan, who had previously coached Doig, called him "an ornament to the game and an example in every respect", emphasising his position as a role model to "present-day players who had found the going hard". During the early 1950s, a number of upcoming footballers were compared to Doig, or said to be the "next George Doig". In 1955, Bernie Naylor was called "the greatest centre-forward since George Doig".

Doig was inducted into the Western Australian Institute of Sport's Hall of Champions in September 1988. As part of millennium celebrations, both the newspaper The West Australian and the Australian rules football website Full Points Footy named Doig in their Western Australian "Teams of the Century". He was also named in East Fremantle's Team of the Century, named in 1997 as part of the club's centenary celebrations, and was an initial inductee into the Fremantle Football Hall of Legends, inaugurated in 1995 by the Fremantle Football Club. In 2003, the Fremantle Football Club named its best and fairest award, the Doig Medal, in recognition of the contribution George Doig and the Doig family had made to football in Fremantle. Doig presented the award until his death, when his son, Don, took over. After his death, a number of people acknowledged his contribution to football in Western Australia, including Rick Hart, the president of the Fremantle Football Club, and Alan Carpenter, the Premier of Western Australia at the time. The eulogy at his funeral was given by Cameron Schwab, at the time the CEO of the Fremantle Football Club. A cul-de-sac in a small housing development in Bicton, close to where Doig and his immediate family had lived, was named Doig Court a short time before his death.

== Notes ==
^{a} Doig's 152 goal record was passed in the Victorian Football Association in 1939 by George Hawkins, and several times by other players prior to 1953; but Doig was still recognised as the national record holder because the VFA was playing under a different set of rules at the time than the Victorian Football League.
^{b} "Home-and-away season" is an Australian term referring to the "regular season" matches of a competition, that is, excluding playoffs or pre-season games. The term derives from the practice of each team playing every other team in the league twice: once at each team's home ground.
^{c} Sir Donald Bradman was an Australian cricketer widely considered the greatest Australian sportsman of all time. Bradman was known particularly for his accumulation of runs and the number of batting records he broke during his career. Even during his career, "Bradman" became a byword for any record-breaking Australian sportsman. Hence, outstanding Australian sporting achievements, whether in cricket or some other sport, are considered Bradmanesque.
