= Pat Dalton =

Australian rules footballer (1942–2020)

Personal information
- Full name: Patrick James Dalton
- Born: 12 June 1942
- Died: 8 January 2020 (aged 77)
- Original team: South Perth

Playing career^{1}
Years	Club	Games (Goals)
1960–1971	Perth	217 (137)
- ^{1} Playing statistics correct to the end of 1971.

Patrick James Dalton (12 June 1942 – 8 January 2020) was an Australian rules footballer who played 217 games for Perth in the WANFL from 1960 to 1971. He was named on the interchange bench in Perth's official "Team of the Century". A regular for Perth during the 1960s, Dalton was almost always used as a centreman. He was a member of three consecutive premiership teams at Perth, in 1966, 1967 and 1968.

Dalton won the 1970 Sandover Medal, in his second-last league season, and also won two Perth best and fairest awards during his career. He represented the Western Australian state team on one occasion, against Victoria in 1969.
