= Merv McIntosh =

Australian rules footballer

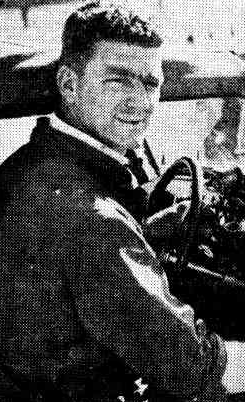

Personal information
- Full name: Mervyn Frederick McIntosh
- Born: 25 November 1922; Subiaco, Western Australia
- Died: 3 May 2010 (aged 87); Salter Point, Western Australia
- Height: 6 ft 6 in (197 cm)
- Weight: 16 st 7 lb (105 kg)
- Position: Ruckman

Playing career^{1}
Years	Club	Games (Goals)
1939–41, 1946–55	Perth	217 (79)

Representative team honours
Years	Team	Games (Goals)
1947–1955	Western Australia	24 (8)
- ^{1} Playing statistics correct to the end of 1955.

Career highlights
- WANFL premiership player – 1955; Sandover Medal – 1948, 1953, 1954; Simpson Medal – 1952, 1953, 1955; Tassie Medal – 1953; Perth fairest and best – 1946–1950, 1952, 1954; All-Australian – 1953; Australian Football Hall of Fame – inductee 1996, legend status 2021

Mervyn Frederick McIntosh (25 November 1922 – 3 May 2010) was an Australian rules footballer in the (then) West Australian National Football League (WANFL). A brilliant ruckman, he was awarded the Sandover Medal as the fairest and best player in the league three times while playing with the Perth Football Club.

== Playing career ==
Merv McIntosh played 217 games for Perth, plus 20 state games for Western Australia, between 1939 and 1955. This number would have been substantially greater but for missing the latter half of 1941 due to surgery, the restriction of WANFL competition to players under 18 or 19 between 1942 and 1944, and missing all of 1945 due to service in World War II. During that war McIntosh turned down several offers to play with Carlton, but he did play a number of games with army teams.

In a richly rewarded career McIntosh won three Sandover Medals, three Simpson Medals and a Tassie Medal (as the best player at the 1953 Adelaide National Football Carnival). He was named in the 1953 All-Australian Team. His Simpson Medal winning performance in his last game, propelling Perth to a two-point victory in the 1955 WANFL Grand Final (Perth's first for 48 years), is legendary. At half-time, East Fremantle had a 34-point lead, but in the third quarter McIntosh led his side to get within two points at the last change. In the final quarter, kicking into the wind, Perth got in front and hold East Fremantle at bay to win 11.11 (77) to 11.9 (75). McIntosh's strategy was to stay in the dead pocket and repeatedly knock the ball out-of-bounds.

He won seven best and fairest awards for his club. He is depicted in a Western Australian state guernsey in Jamie Cooper's painting The Game That Made Australia, commissioned by the AFL in 2008 to celebrate the 150th anniversary of the sport.

== Honours ==
In 1996, Merv McIntosh was an inaugural inductee in the Australian Football Hall of Fame. In 2021, he was elevated to Legend status, becoming the first player who played his entire career in the WANFL/WAFL to receive the honour.

In 2004, he was inducted into Legend Status in the West Australian Football Hall of Fame.

The Merv McIntosh Entrance to the Subiaco Oval was named in his honour.

== War service ==
McIntosh enlisted with the Australian Army in 1941 and was discharged in 1946.

== Family ==
McIntosh was married to Betty. Together they had six children. Their daughter, Jill McIntosh, is a former Australia netball international and national team head coach.
