= Cyril Hoft =

Australian rules footballer

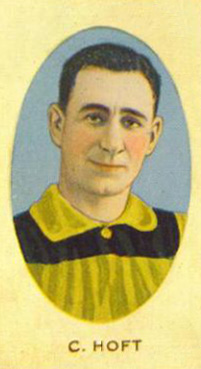

Personal information
- Full name: Cyril Louis Hoft
- Born: 24 September 1896; Perth, Western Australia
- Died: 5 July 1949 (aged 52); Perth, Western Australia
- Height: 177 cm (5 ft 10 in)
- Weight: 63 kg (139 lb)
- Position: Wing

Playing career^{1}
| Years | Club | Games (Goals) |
| 1914–15 | North Fremantle | 11 (?) |
| 1919–28 | Perth | 88 (?) |
| 1924–27 | Glenelg | 56 (?) |

Representative team honours
| Years | Team | Games (Goals) |
| 1921–23 | Western Australia | 3 (1) |
| 1924–27 | South Australia | unknown |
- ^{1} Playing statistics correct to the end of 1928.

Career highlights
- AIF Pioneer Exhibition Game, London, 28 October 1916; Sandover Medal 1921; Glenelg captain 1924–25; Glenelg best and fairest 1924

Cyril Louis Hoft (24 September 1896 – 5 July 1949) was an Australian rules footballer who played for the North Fremantle and Perth Football Clubs in the West Australian Football League (WAFL) and the Glenelg Football Club in the South Australian Football League (SAFL).

== Family and early life ==
The son of Herman Hoft (-1936), and Amelia Ann Hoft (-1954), née Haley, Cyril Louis Hoft was born on 24 September 1896. He grew up in the South-West region of Western Australia, moving to Perth to attend Scotch College, where he played in the school's football team.

He married Dorothy Marjorie Davies, in Perth, on 22 June 1925.

== Football ==
=== North Fremantle (WAFL) ===
Because his school was located in North Fremantle recruitment zone, Hoft began his career with that club, playing eleven games for North Fremantle in 1914.

=== Third Divisional team (AIF) ===
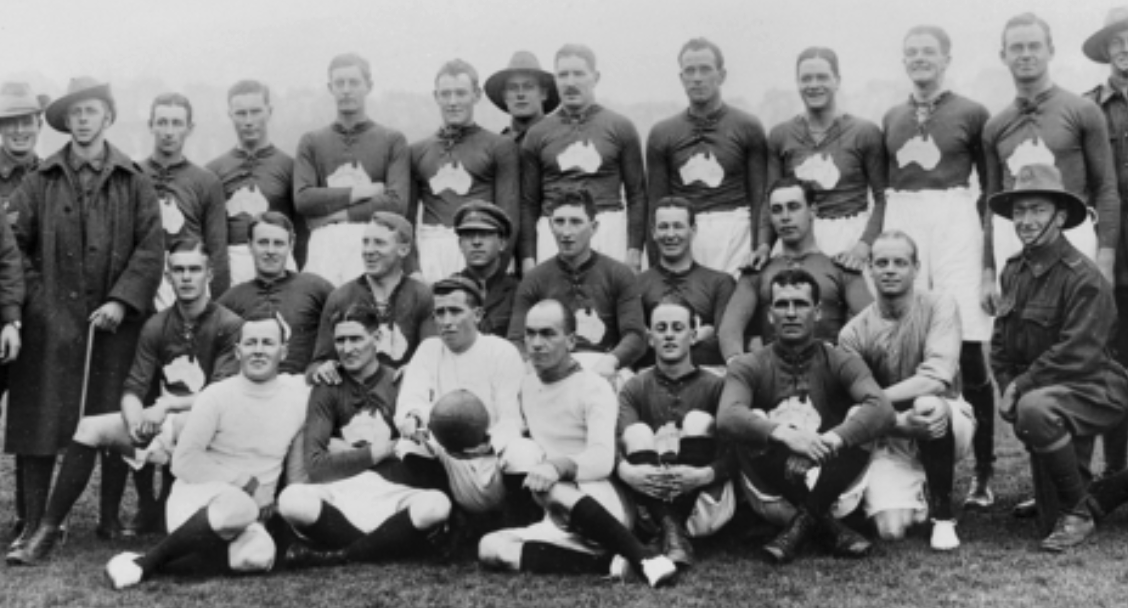
The Third Australian Divisional Team: 28 October 1916. Cyril Hoft is the player at the extreme left, back row.

He played for the (winning) Third Australian Divisional team in the famous "Pioneer Exhibition Game" of Australian Rules football, held in London, in October 1916 that had been organised by Frank Beaurepaire. A news film was taken at the match.

=== Perth (WAFL) ===
Hoft resuming his league career with Perth in 1919.

==== Sandover medal ====
Hoft tied with Subiaco's Tom Outridge, on 14 votes, in the inaugural Sandover Medal count in 1921. Prior to 1930, only one vote was given in each game, meaning that both Hoft and Outridge had been best on the ground in 14 matches.

Because there was no provision, in that inaugural year, for a tied vote, and it was decided to leave the choice of the single winner to "an adjudicator" that was to be appointed by Messrs. Sandover and Co. (the donors of the medal). It was decided to allow the WAFL president, Alf Moffat, to cast the deciding vote, which he gave to Outridge.

In 1997, along with a number of other players who had tied for first, but lost on countback, Hoft was awarded a retrospective medal.

=== Glenelg (SAFL) ===
In 1924, Hoft switched to Glenelg in the SAFL. Standing out in a team that had yet to win a match, Hoft was appointed captain two rounds into the season, and won the club's best and fairest in 1924. He was appointed captain-coach in 1925, and guided the club to its first ever win after 56 losses, an upset against reigning premiers West Torrens.

=== Perth (WAFL) ===
Hoft returned to Perth in 1928, playing one game in his final season with the club before retiring.

== Interstate football ==
Hoft represented Western Australia at the Fourth Australian National Football Carnival, in Perth, in August 1921, South Australia at the Fifth Australian National Football Carnival, in Hobart, in August 1924, and, once again, South Australia at the Sixth Australian National Football Carnival, in Melbourne, in August 1927.

== Military service ==
Hoft enlisted in the First AIF in February 1915. Serving overseas, as a private, in the 44 Infantry Battalion, he saw action in the European theatre, where he was wounded in action on two separate occasions.

== Death ==
He died in July 1949 after a long illness, leaving his wife (Dorothy, née Davies) and six children (June, Kevin, Les, Lois, Maureen, and Peter).

== See also ==
- 1916 Pioneer Exhibition Game
