= Henry Edmondson (sportsman) =

Tasmanian-born Australian rules footballer

Personal information
- Full name: Henry Watson Edmondson (Note: Both CricketArchive and Cricinfo gives him a middle name of "Pudsey Dawson" but the newspaper articles from his day use "Watson")
- Born: 25 November 1872; Hobart, Tasmania
- Died: 18 August 1946 (aged 73); South Perth, Western Australia
- Position: Forward

Playing career^{1}
| Years | Club | Games (Goals) |
| 1902–1907 | Perth | 74 (131) |
- ^{1} Playing statistics correct to the end of 1907.

Henry Watson Edmondson (25 November 1872 – 18 August 1946) was an Australian rules footballer who played with Perth in the Western Australian Football Association (WAFA). He also played first-class cricket for Western Australia.

Edmondson was already 29 when he started his WAFA career, in 1902. In his first season, he was Perth's leading goal-kicker and he was the full-forward in their 1907 premiership team, which won the grand final on appeal. He kicked two goals on grand final day, the only multiple goal-kicker on either team, in what was his final league appearance.

He played most of his interstate cricket after retiring from football but participated in one first-class match in 1905/06, as a bowler.

In 1912/13, Edmond both played in and was manager of the Western Australia team which toured the country. On this occasion he was used as a top order batsman and scored two half centuries, the best of which was 68 against New South Wales. Against South Australia in Adelaide, Edmondson acted as his side's wicket-keeper in the second innings as usual gloveman Harold Evers was injured. In Sydney, Edmondson got a pair against New South Wales but also got the biggest wicket of his career, that of star Australian Test batsman Victor Trumper. The 1963 edition of Wisden Cricketers' Almanack would name Trumper among the Six Giants of the Wisden Century. He finished his career with 194 runs at 17.63 and four wickets at 56.50, from six first-class matches.

== See also ==
- List of Western Australia first-class cricketers
