= Charles Doig Sr. =

Australian rules footballer and coach

Charles Doig
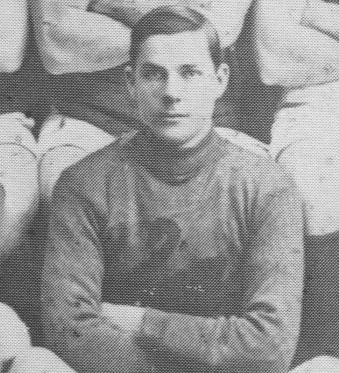

Personal information
- Full name: Charles George Alexander Doig
- Nickname: Chas
- Born: 27 April 1883; Royal Park, South Australia, Australia
- Died: 31 October 1944 (aged 61); Bicton, Western Australia, Australia
- Position: Forward

Playing career^{1}
Years	Club	Games (Goals)
1903–21	East Fremantle	208 (279)

Representative team honours
Years	Team	Games (Goals)
1911–14	Western Australia	8 (1)
- ^{1} Playing statistics correct to the end of 1921.

Career highlights
- East Fremantle premiership side 1904, 1906, 1908–11, 1914; WAFL leading goalkicker 1908, 1909; East Fremantle leading goalkicker 1908, 1909, 1913, 1914

Charles George Alexander Doig (27 April 1883 – 31 October 1944) was an Australian rules football player and coach. A member of the Doig sporting family, Doig played 209 games for the East Fremantle Football Club in the West Australian Football League (WAFL) between 1903 and 1921, including seven premierships. Playing mainly as a forward, Doig led the WAFL's goalkicking on two occasions, in 1908 and 1909. His two sons, Charles Jr. and George Doig, also played football for East Fremantle.

== Career ==
Born to James Alexander Doig and Agnes Robertson in Royal Park, South Australia, Doig was the fourth-born of seven brothers, two of which died as children. His parents had emigrated from Dundee, Scotland in 1878 aboard the steamer Largo Bay.

== Family ==
Doig married Isabella Brand Miller, originally of Dundee, Scotland, at Scots Church, Fremantle, on 27 October 1909. The Western Mail described it as "a remarkably pretty wedding". The couple had three children: Linda May (born 1910), Charles George (born 1912), and George Ronald (born 1913). Both Charles Jr. and George went on to captain East Fremantle.
