= Henry Edmondson (educationalist) =

English schoolmaster

Henry Edmondson (1607?–1659), was an English schoolmaster.

== Life ==
Edmondson was born in Cumberland about 1607, entered Queen's College, Oxford, 10 May 1622, aged 15. 'After he had undergone the servile places of a poor child and tabarder' he proceeded B.A. 31 June 1626 and M.A. 30 June 1630, and was elected fellow of his college. He became usher of Tunbridge school, Kent, under Dr. Nicholas Grey, and in 1655, on the death of Thomas Widdowes, was appointed by his college master of the endowed free school of Northleach, Gloucestershire, where he remained till his death. He was buried in the church there on 15 July 1659, leaving behind him the reputation of a highly efficient schoolmaster.

== Works ==
His works, all on educational topics, were:

- 'Lingua Linguarum. The natural language of languages, wherein it is desired and endeavoured that tongues may be brought to teach themselves and words may be best fancied, understood, and remembered,’ London, 1655.
- 'Homonyma et Synonyma Linguæ Latinæ conjuncta & disjuncta,’ Oxford, 1661.

There is also a work by Edmondson in manuscript at the Bodleian (Rawl. MS. in Bibl. Bodl. Misc. p. 226) entitled 'Incruenta Contentio sive Bellum Rationale,’ dedicated to Sir Henry Worsley, bart., and dated 1 January 1646–7. It is 'a collection of arguments pro and con divided into seven parts, viz. Academia, Aula, Campus Martius, Respublica, Domus Exterior, Domus Interior, and Domus Superior.'
