= Doig (surname) =

Doig is a surname originating from Scotland. This is an anglicised form of the Scottish Gaelic name Mac Gille Doig - a compound of the elements "mac" meaning "son of", "gille", a servant, plus the personal name Doig, a short form of Cadog. The name therefore translates as "son of St. Cadog's servant". In Scotland, the name appears most often on record in places where St Cadog was commemorated. The name was first recorded in the latter half of the 14th century as "Dog'. The spelling 'Doig' appears in the 17th century. Other modern variants of the name are Doag, Doeg, Doak, and Doidge.

Notable people with the surname include:

- Andrew W. Doig (1799–1875), American politician
- Alison Harcourt (born 1929 as Alison Doig), Australian mathematician and statistician
- Anna Doig (born 1965), New Zealand swimmer
- Charles C Doig (1855–1918), British architect
- Chris Doig (born 1981), Scottish footballer
- Chris Doig (c.1949–2011), New Zealand opera singer
- Clive Doig (born 1940), British television producer
- Dale Doig (1935–2022), American politician, mayor of Fresno, California
- Edna Nell Doig (1915–1988), Australian army matron-in-chief
- Federico Kauffmann Doig (born 1928), Peruvian historian
- George Doig (1913–2006), Australian rules footballer
- Ivan Doig (1939–2015), American novelist
- Jack Doig (1872–1951), New Zealand cricketer
- Jason Doig (born 1977), Canadian ice hockey player
- Josh Doig (born 2002), Scottish footballer
- Keith Doig (born 1891), Australian rules footballer
- Lexa Doig (born 1973), Canadian actress
- Mel Doig (1912–1998), Canadian politician
- Ned Doig (1866–1919), Scottish footballer
- Norm Doig (1910–2001), Australian rules footballer
- Peter Doig (born 1959), Scottish painter
- Peter Doig (trade unionist) (1882–1952), Scottish trade union leader
- Peter Doig (politician) (1911–1996), British Labour Party politician
- Ron Doig Sr. (1909–1932), Australian sportsman
- Russell Doig (born 1964), Scottish footballer
- Steve Doig (born 1960), American football player
- Tom Doig (born 1979), New Zealand author

== Bibliography ==
- Hanks, Patrick (2003). Dictionary of American family names. Oxford, UK: Oxford University Press. ISBN 0-19-508137-4. OCLC 51655476.
