= Perth Football Club =

Australian rules football club

Names
- Full name: Perth Football Club INC
- Former name: Victoria Park Football Club (1934–35)
- Nickname(s): Demons, Redlegs

2025 season
- Home-and-away season: 5th
- Leading goalkicker: Aaron Clarke
- Best and fairest: Charlie Constable

Club details
- Founded: 1899; 127 years ago
- Colours: Black Red
- Competition: West Australian Football League
- President: Adrian Barich
- Coach: Mark Stone
- Captain(s): Charlie Constable & Corey Byrne
- Premierships: 7 (1907, 1955, 1966, 1967, 1968, 1976, 1977)
- Ground: Mineral Resources Park (capacity: 6,000)

Uniforms
Home	Away

Other information
- Official website: perthfc.com.au

The Perth Football Club, nicknamed the Demons, is an Australian rules football club based in Lathlain, Western Australia, currently playing in the West Australian Football League (WAFL) and WAFL Women's (WAFLW).

Representing the south-east area of the Perth metropolitan region, the club currently trains and plays its home games at Lathlain Park (currently known, for sponsorship reasons, as Mineral Resources Park), having previously played at the WACA Ground between 1899 and 1958 and later in 1987 and 1988.

The club was founded in 1899 and began play in the First Rate Junior Association, but was promoted to the WAFL after eight games to replace the Rovers Football Club after they dropped out of the league and folded, with Perth drawing much of its inaugural WAFL squad from Rovers. Perth won its first premiership in 1907, but did not win their second until 1955. Overall, the club has won seven premierships, including a hat-trick between 1966 and 1968, with the last coming in 1977. Perth is statistically one of the least successful teams in the competition, and has not played in a grand final since 1978. The club have also endured lengthy finals droughts from 1986 to 1997, and again between from 1997 to 2020. In 2025, Perth broke their 28 year finals win drought dating back to 1997, defeating East Fremantle 106-77.

The current coach of the club is Mark Stone, who took over from Peter German prior to the 2024 WAFL season. The club have fielded a senior women's team in the WAFLW competition since 2025, being the last WAFL club to do so.

== History ==
Formed in 1899, Perth is the fourth-oldest of the nine WAFL clubs. The club played its early football in the Perth First Rate Junior Competition before replacing Rovers mid-way during the 1899 WAFA season after Rovers was unable to continue. The club enjoyed success in the latter part of the 1900s, winning its first premiership in controversial circumstances in 1907: the club originally lost the grand final against East Fremantle by five points, but this was amended to a one-point victory after Perth successfully protested that the free kick from which one of East Fremantle's goals was scored was awarded after the half time bell. The two clubs faced each other again in the 1908 and 1909 grand finals, East Fremantle victorious on both occasions.

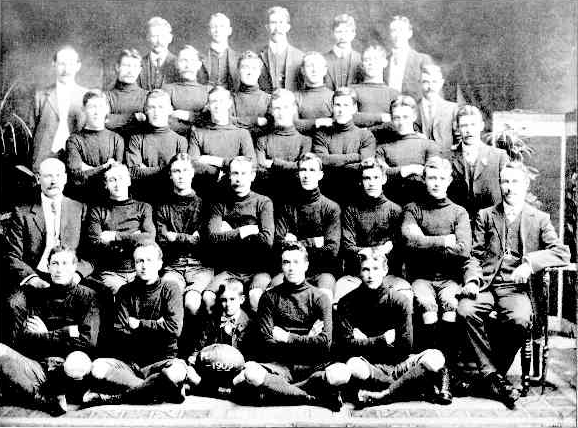
Perth's Grand Final team from 1909

Perth remained competitive for the following decade despite a brief lapse that saw them fall to last in 1912. In the 1915 Grand Final they dominated against Subiaco but could not convert, losing a low-scoring game 2.7 (19) to 3.3 (21). During the war years Perth continued to be prominent, finishing third in each of 1916, 1917 and 1918, but following the end of the war Perth (or Victoria Park as they were known in 1934 and 1935) was to have a long period in the doldrums. In the twenty-five open-age seasons from 1919 to 1946 Perth played in the finals only three times for just one win over East Perth in 1934. This record is made much worse by the fact that up to 1925 before Claremont-Cottesloe were admitted four of six teams played off and to 1933 four of seven did so. From 1921 to 1923 the club suffered the ignominy of a hat-trick of wooden spoons, and though it became more competitive in the ensuing decade only in 1927, 1934 and 1939 did the Redlegs win more games than they lost. Despite the team's lack of collective success, Perth in the inter-war years was home to a number of outstanding players, including ruckman/forward Doug Oliphant, pacy centreman Cyril Hoft and full-forwards Alan Evans (who against East Fremantle in 1921 kicked thirteen of fourteen goals) and Albert Gook.

Like most clubs, Perth lost a number of players due to the First and Second World Wars, with many players enlisted in the Australian Defence Force. In total, nineteen Perth players were killed on active duty in the two wars. Anthony Alexander Forrest, who played two games for the club in 1900, was killed in the Second Boer War in 1901.

=== Postwar power and relocation ===
Despite its failures at senior level up to 1946, Perth reached the preliminary final of the 1944 underage competition, and aided by inequitable metropolitan zoning,^{[a]} this group of young players allowed the club to become finals regulars along with West Perth, South Fremantle and East Fremantle from 1947 to 1951. Perth eventually settled as third in the WANFL pecking order during this period, and surprisingly even took a first-ever minor premiership in 1949 before making its first grand final for thirty-four years, only to lose to a more hardened West Perth. In 1950 they reversed the 1949 Grand Final result against the Cardinals but lost narrowly to an inaccurate South Fremantle in the premiership decider.

The next four years saw Perth decline somewhat, winning only six games in 1952 and being unconvincing against the might of South Fremantle and West Perth in the other three seasons. However, with champion ruckman Merv McIntosh desperate to see his team with a premiership, Perth under experienced former Carlton centreman Ern Henfry and captain Keith Harper, improved in 1955 to win fourteen of twenty minor round games and defeat the Cardinals in the first semi-final. They then upset South by twelve points and came back on a windy day to defeat East Fremantle by two points in the 1955 WANFL Grand Final for their first premiership in forty-eight years. McIntosh crowned his last game winning the Simpson Medal for best on field.

In the following four years Perth remained a force – most notably in nearly keeping East Perth goalless on a rain-drenched WACA in early 1956 – but could never overcome the Royals or East Fremantle in the finals. In order to draw closer to their metropolitan recruiting zone on the southern side of the Swan River, the club moved in 1959 to a new home at Lathlain Park. Their first game there was on Anzac Day and they beat Swan Districts, but that year ended ingloriously against Subiaco – for years the WANFL's "chopping block" – who in their first final since Perth's rise to power in 1947 kicked an amazing 16.8 (104) in the third quarter.

=== 1960s and 1970s dynasties ===
Perth took a while to recover from this caning and finished seventh, sixth and sixth in the following three seasons, but aided by a vigorous junior football council and strong support from local businesses, the Demons soon returned as a force despite twice failing in the finals in 1963 and 1964 and dropping to fifth in 1965 with ten wins from twenty-one games.

The appointment of Malcolm Atwell as captain-coach in 1966 was at first controversial, but with such young players as Barry Cable, Perth more than fulfilled the most sanguine expectations. The Demons thrashed South Fremantle by 143 points in the opening game and from then on were always the team to beat, scoring a 16-point win over East Perth in the 1966 Grand Final. The next year, in 1967, the same clubs played off with a similar result – with the margin stretched to 18 points. Then in 1968 it was Perth, again over East Perth, by 24 points. In each case Perth was led by Atwell, with Cable collecting three Simpson Medals for brilliant best-on-ground roving performances. In 1970 the Demons were favoured to win a fourth flag in five years, but were convincingly upset by South Fremantle despite having more scoring shots.

1971, despite the return of Barry Cable from North Melbourne where he had transferred in 1970, saw Perth decline abruptly to seventh or eight with only eight wins and a draw, and after a return to third in 1972, Cable's last year with the club in 1973 saw them win only six games (their worst year since 1941 when they won only four matches). Perth, however, rebounded under the coaching of former captain and 1955 premiership player Ken Armstrong. He took their 1974 team, skippered by the versatile Bob Shields, into the Grand Final. Though wingman David Pretty won the Simpson Medal, Perth failed against East Fremantle, and missed the finals in 1975. However, despite not being perfectly consistent during the home-and-away round, the Demons under new captain Colin Lofts clicked when it counted, taking out the 1976 Grand Final by 23 points, again at the expense of East Perth. Courageous defender, Mal Day, won the Simpson Medal for an outstanding game. Except when affected by a major injury to star rover Robert Wiley, the Demons dominated in 1977, capping the season off with a record 26.13 (169) Grand Final winning score against East Fremantle. Ruckman Wim Rosbender marked his best season, winning the Simpson Medal.

Armstrong and new captain Ken Inman had high hopes of another premiership hat-trick with big wins during the 1978 season. Their goal was denied by just two points in a grand final marred by very wet conditions.

=== Long-term decline ===
After three decades among the WANFL elite, Perth declined abruptly in 1979, winning only eight games of twenty-one and finishing a distant sixth. The departure of Armstrong to Subiaco in 1980 only made things worse: despite the presence of a fine coach in Alan Joyce for two seasons, Perth never improved upon 1979's sixth place between 1980 and 1985 and won only 28 of its 126 games. The recruitment of proven coach Mal Brown that year was hoped to make the Demons a WAFL power, but after finishing third in 1986 the club was devastated by the loss of players to new VFL club West Coast and fell back down the ladder, ultimately taking wooden spoons in 1993 and 1994 and not being able to stay far from the bottom.

During the 1980s and 1990s, the club also had severe financial problems, so bad that in 1990 after losing revenue from gate pooling and the WAFC being forced to pay the West Coast Eagles' licence fee as its holder, the Demons had to raise $100,000 to avoid folding at the close of the season. There were unsuccessful plans by the WAFL to relocate the Demons to the Perth Hills to capture expanding outer suburbs as West Perth did by moving to Joondalup, but in spite of the trouble many players had travelling to Lathlain, the Perth board voted by 115 to 83 to remain there on 11 July 1995. Continuing financial losses reached a peak in 1997.

Despite an inglorious start with its lowest score since 1952 against Swan Districts, 1997 saw the Demons play consistently enough to record their best home-and-away performance for nineteen years, missing out on the double chance by only five percent from East Fremantle. The manner in which the Demons reversed a last round loss to East Perth by eleven goals in the first semi final might have made people think at the very least a grand final berth was forthcoming, but South Fremantle put paid to that with a six-goal win in the preliminary final.

Suffering from internal dissent as presidents Barry McGrath and Nick Catalano were opposed by the board over not only relocation, which most other members opposed in favour of a better deal from the West Australian Football Commission, but also the admission of Peel Thunder, Perth immediately returned to the basement. In 1998 with the loss of key players Brett Spinks, Winston Abraham, Shane Cable, Matthew McMurray, Dean Bertram and Darren Rigby, the Demons won a mere four games and in 2000 were very lucky not to have their first winless season, beating Swan Districts in the final round. Despite the recruitment of a proven coach in Stan Magro, Perth were not able to sustain improvements to a 50/50 win–loss ratio in 2002 and 2004.

In 2005 the Demons won only three games, and then recruitment of another high-profile coach in former North Adelaide, Norwood and Adelaide Crows champion Andrew Jarman collapsed completely after a promising 2009 season: the Demons won only two games in 2010 for their fourteenth wooden spoon. The cycle was repeated even more dramatically in 2014: the Demons had looked like a first league finals berth since 1997 before fading and had had both lower grades make the top four in 2013, but in 2014 after winning their opening two matches an injury crisis and off-field dissent wrecked Perth to such an extent that it won only one more match for its fifteenth wooden spoon and ninth since 1981. The club under coach Earl Spalding led the Demons to being more competitive after his appointment in 2015, the club's 120 year in 2019 saw them narrowly missed the finals by percentage despite winning their first five games but had to win the last game against Peel Thunder but lost by three points to miss out, the next season Perth made their first finals series in 23 years in Spalding's final season as coach in a shortened season due to COVID winning their final regular season game by 5 points versus the eventual premier South Fremantle before losing to West Perth in a semi final by 11 points.

In 2025, the Demons broke their 28 year final win drought dating back to 1997, defeating East Fremantle 106-77 at East Fremantle Oval. The Demons were eliminated by Claremont the following week.

== Club song ==
The club song of the Perth Football Club is sung to the tune of the Anthem of the United States Marine Corps, the same tune is used by the Adelaide Crows and the Werribee Tigers.

From the playing fields of rival clubs
To our home in Lathlain Park,
On the West Australian Football fields
We have carved a magic mark.
We are called the mighty Demons
And we're feared by one and all,
And the more they try to conquer us,
The harder still they fall.

We are rough and ruthless Demons,
We're the toughest in the West,
And through thick and thin the Demons
Will always stand the test.
We are called the mighty Demons,
And we're feared by one and all,
And the more they try to conquer us
The harder still they fall.

== Honours ==
=== Club honours ===
Premierships
Competition	Level	Wins	Years won
West Australian Football League	Men's Seniors	7	1907, 1955, 1966, 1967, 1968, 1976, 1977
West Australian Football League	Men's Reserves	13	1925, 1949, 1955, 1957, 1963, 1968, 1971, 1973, 1974, 1975, 1988, 1996, 2021
West Australian Football League	Colts (Boys U19)	8	1959, 1960, 1961, 1963, 1964, 1965, 1972, 1999
Other titles and honours
Rodriguez Shield	Multiple	4	1963, 1964, 1968, 1978
Finishing positions
West Australian Football League	Minor premiership (men's seniors)	7	1949, 1963, 1966, 1968, 1970, 1977, 1978
West Australian Football League	Runners-up (men's seniors)	10	1904, 1908, 1909, 1913, 1915, 1949, 1950, 1970, 1974, 1978
West Australian Football League	Wooden spoons (men's seniors)	18	1900, 1912, 1921, 1922, 1923, 1935, 1942, 1981, 1983, 1984, 1993, 1994, 2000, 2007, 2010, 2014, 2015, 2017

=== Individual honours ===
Sandover Medalists: (17 total) 1921: Cyril Hoft,^{[e]} 1943: Terry Moriarty,^{[f]} 1945: George Bailey, 1948: Merv McIntosh, 1953: Merv McIntosh, 1954: Merv McIntosh, 1961: Neville Beard, 1964: Barry Cable, 1968: Barry Cable, 1970: Pat Dalton, 1972: Ian Miller, 1973: Barry Cable, 1983: Bryan Cousins,^{[d]} 1987: Mark Watson, 1999: Gus Seebeck, 2009: Ross Young, 2025: Charlie Constable

Bernie Naylor Medalists: (11 total) 1913: Alf Halliday (46), 1914: Alf Halliday (38), 1916: Alf Halliday (38), 1921: Allan Evans (64), 1931: Doug Oliphant (84), 1939: Albert Gook (102), 1950: Ron Tucker (115), 1975: Murray Couper (63), 1985: Mick Rea (100), 1986: Mick Rea (90), 1994: Brenton Cooper (90)

All Australians:(7 total) 1953: Merv McIntosh, 1956: Keith Harper, 1966 & 1969: Barry Cable, 1969: Greg Brehaut, 1972: Ian Miller, 1986: Robert Wiley

Tassie Medallists: (2 total) 1953: Merv McIntosh, 1966: Barry Cable

== Records ==
Highest Score: Round 4, 1977 – 30.18 (198) vs. South Fremantle at Lathlain Park

Lowest Score: Round 10, 1903 – 0.3 (3) vs. East Fremantle at Fremantle Oval

Greatest Winning Margin: Round 15, 1904 – 153 points vs. Subiaco at WACA

Greatest Losing Margin: Round 17, 1981 – 173 points vs. Claremont at Claremont Oval

Most Games: Terry Moriarty 253 (1942–1953)

Record Home Attendance: Round 6, 1967 – 19,541 v East Perth

Record Finals Attendance: 1966 Grand Final – 46,763 v East Perth at Subiaco Oval

Longest Winning Streak: 14 games, from Round 12, 1968 to Round 2, 1969 (including 1968 premiership)

Longest Losing Streak: 20 games, from Round 20, 1999 to Round 20, 2000^{[d]}

== Notable players ==
12 separate Perth players have won the Sandover Medal for best and fairest player in the WAFL including two players, Merv McIntosh and Barry Cable, who have won the medal three times. McIntosh and Cable both have Legend status in the Australian Football Hall of Fame.

Recent AFL players who originated from the Perth Football Club include Lance Franklin, Chance Bateman, Troy Cook, Leon Davis, Darren Glass, Steven Armstrong, Scott Stevens, Damon White, Brennan Stack, Mark Coughlan, Ryan Hargrave, Michael Johnson, Sharrod Wellingham, Chris Mayne and David Myers.

== Team of the Century ==
Team of the Century
B:	Marcel Hilsz	Bill Mckenzie	George Bailey
HB:	Bob Shields	Alan Shepherd	Bert Wansborough
C:	Keith Harper	Ern Henfry	Greg Brehaut
HF:	Ian Miller	Ron Tucker	Peter Bosustow
F:	Paddy Astone	Murray Cooper	Robert Wiley
Foll:	Merv McIntosh	Doug Oliphant	Barry Cable
Int:	Alex Clarke	Alan Johnson	Reg Zeuner
Int:	Pat Dalton		
Coach:	Malcolm Atwell		

== Notes ==
^{a} During the period between 1946 and 1954, Perth's zone had over twice as many residents as the zones of East Fremantle, South Fremantle, Subiaco and Swan Districts
^{b} from 1925
^{c} from 1957
^{d} 21 games without win from Round 7, 1922 to Round 13, 1923
^{e} Awarded retrospectively by Westar Rules in 1997
^{f} Moriarty's Sandover was won in a competition restricted to players under nineteen as of 1 October 1943 owing to the loss of players to World War II
