= List of WAFL Women's premiers =

This page is a complete chronological list of the WAFL Women's premiers. The WAFL Women's (WAFLW) is the major state-level women's Australian rules football league in Western Australia. After a finals series, culminating in a Grand Final, the winning team is awarded the premiership cup, and determined to be the premiers for that season. Currently Claremont and East Fremantle have the most premierships in the competition, having won three titles each.

The Lou Knitter Medal is presented to the player judged best afield in the WAFLW Grand Final.

== List of premiers ==
The following is a list of premiers and the grand final results.

Premiership decided by a Grand Final
Premiership decided by ET, after the scheduled Grand Final was drawn

Season	Premiers	Runners-up	Score	Lou Knitter Medal	Venue	Date
2019	East Fremantle	Swan Districts	8.5 (53) d. 4.4 (28)	Gabby O'Sullivan (East Fremantle)	Lathlain Park	14 September 2019
2020	Peel Thunder	Subiaco	4.4 (28) d. 2.1 (13)	Chloe Wrigley (Peel Thunder)	Arena Joondalup	19 September 2020
2021	Peel Thunder (2)	Swan Districts (2)	5.3 (33) d. 2.3 (15)	Sabreena Duffy (Peel Thunder)	Rushton Park	11 July 2021
2022	Claremont	East Fremantle	7.4 (46) d. 6.2 (38)	Jasmin Stewart (Claremont)	Claremont Oval	2 July 2022
2023	East Fremantle (2)	Claremont	4.2 (26) d. 2.2 (14)	Zippy Fish (East Fremantle)	Mineral Resources Park	15 July 2023
2024	Claremont (2)	East Fremantle (2)	3.2 (20) d. 2.5 (17)	Jayme Harken (Claremont)	Pentanet Stadium	7 July 2024
2025	Claremont (3)	Swan Districts (3)	3.6 (24) d. 3.5 (23)	Jayme Harken (Claremont)	Mineral Resources Park	24 August 2025
2026	East Fremantle (3)	Swan Districts (4)	3.5 (23) d. 2.7 (19)	Jaime Henry (Swan Districts)	Fremantle Community Bank Oval	23 August 2026

Table correct to the end of the 2026 season.

== Premierships by team ==
This table summarises all premierships won by each team.

Club	Grand final matches	Premierships		Runners-up	
Club	Grand final matches	Total	Years	Total	Years
East Fremantle	5	3	2019, 2023, 2026	2	2022, 2024
Claremont	4	3	2022, 2024, 2025	1	2023
Peel Thunder	2	2	2020, 2021	0	—
Swan Districts	4	0	—	4	2019, 2021, 2025, 2026
Subiaco	1	0	—	1	2020
South Fremantle	0	0	—	0	—
West Perth	0	0	—	0	—
East Perth	0	0	—	0	—
Perth	0	0	—	0	—

Table correct to the end of the 2026 season.

=== Premiership frequency ===
Club	Seasons	Seasons	Premierships	Runners-up	Strike rate	Average years per	
Club	Seasons	Seasons	Premierships	Runners-up	Strike rate	Premiership	Grand final
Claremont	2019–present	8	3	1	37.5%	2.67	2.00
East Fremantle	2019–present	8	3	2	37.5%	2.67	1.6
Peel Thunder	2019–present	8	2	0	25.0%	4.00	4.00
Swan Districts	2019–present	8	0	4	0.00%	—	2.00
Subiaco	2019–present	8	0	1	0.00%	—	8.00
South Fremantle	2020–present	7	0	0	0.00%	—	—
West Perth	2022–present	5	0	0	0.00%	—	—
East Perth	2023–present	4	0	0	0.00%	—	—
Perth	2025–present	2	0	0	0.00%	—	—

Table correct to the end of the 2026 season.

=== Premiership droughts ===
The duration of the drought is given as the number of full seasons contested between premierships; the season in which the drought is broken is considered to be part of the drought, and if the drought began from a club's entry to the league, the club's inaugural season is also considered to be part of the drought.

^{+}	Drought began upon club's entry to league

Club	Seasons	Start	Grand final appearances during drought
Swan Districts	8	2019^{+}	2019, 2021, 2025, 2026
Subiaco	8	2019^{+}	2020
South Fremantle	7	2020^{+}	
West Perth	5	2022^{+}	
Peel Thunder	5	2021	
East Perth	4	2023^{+}	
Perth	2	2025^{+}	
Claremont	1	2025	
East Fremantle	0	2026	

Table correct to the end of the 2026 season.

=== Grand Final matchups ===
This is a list of the grand final matchups between two teams in the WAFL Women's, thus far.

#	Match-up	Grand Final Appearances	Team(s) Premiership Years	
			Team(s)	Premiership Years
3	East Fremantle vs Claremont	2022, 2023, 2024	East Fremantle	2023
3	East Fremantle vs Claremont	2022, 2023, 2024	Claremont	2022, 2024
2	Swan Districts vs East Fremantle	2019, 2026	Swan Districts	-
2	Swan Districts vs East Fremantle	2019, 2026	East Fremantle	2019, 2026
1	Subiaco vs Peel Thunder	2020	Subiaco	-
1	Subiaco vs Peel Thunder	2020	Peel Thunder	2020
1	Peel Thunder vs Swan Districts	2021	Peel Thunder	2021
1	Peel Thunder vs Swan Districts	2021	Swan Districts	-
1	Claremont vs Swan Districts	2025	Claremont	2025
1	Claremont vs Swan Districts	2025	Swan Districts	-

Table correct to the end of the 2026 season.

== Reserves-grade and Rogers Cup premierships ==
=== WAFLW Reserves ===
A reserve-grade competition, known as the WAFLW Reserves, was held between 2019 and 2022, before being suspended by the state's football commission.

Season	Premiers	Runners-up	Score	Venue	Date	Ref.
2019	Claremont	South Fremantle	7.5 (47) d. 2.0 (12)	Lathlain Park	14 September 2019	
2020	Claremont (2)	East Fremantle	3.1 (19) d. 2.5 (17)	Arena Joondalup	19 September 2020	
2021	Peel Thunder	East Fremantle	6.4 (40) d. 5.4 (34)	Rushton Park	11 July 2021	
2022	Claremont (3)	East Fremantle	3.5 (35) d. 2.2 (14)	Claremont Oval	2 July 2022	

=== Rogers Cup ===
The Rogers Cup is the leading under-18/19 development pathway competition for young female footballers. It was inaugurated in 2013 by the West Australian Women's Football League (WAWFL) before the WAFL assumed ownership of the competition in 2021.

Season	Premiers	Runners-up	Score	Venue	Date	Ref.
2013	South Fremantle	Peel Thunderbirds	3.7 (25) d. 3.6 (24)	Unknown	25 August 2013	
2014	Peel Thunderbirds	Claremont	5.11 (41) d. 3.4 (22)	Arena Joondalup	31 August 2014	
2015	Peel Thunderbirds (2)	South Fremantle	5.5 (35) d. 2.4 (16)	East Fremantle Oval	6 September 2015	
2016	Peel Thunderbirds (3)	Swan Districts	11.9 (75) d. 5.3 (33)	Leederville Oval	28 August 2016	
2017	Swan Districts	South Fremantle	3.7 (25) d. 2.3 (15)	Leederville Oval	20 August 2017	
2018	Peel Thunderbirds (4)	East Fremantle	5.8 (38) d. 3.0 (18)	Claremont Oval	26 August 2018	
2019	Peel Thunder (5)	South Fremantle	6.8 (44) d. 5.1 (31)	Lathlain Park	14 September 2019	
2020	South Fremantle (2)	Peel Thunder	8.4 (52) d. 1.4 (10)	Arena Joondalup	19 September 2020	
2021	West Perth	South Fremantle	10.6 (66) d. 1.3 (9)	Rushton Park	11 July 2021	
2022	East Fremantle	Peel Thunder	12.6 (78) d. 2.5 (17)	Claremont Oval	2 July 2022	
2023	West Perth (2)	South Fremantle	3.4 (22) d. 2.7 (19)	Lathlain Park	15 July 2023	
2024	West Perth (3)	Subiaco	3.12 (30) d. 0.0 (0)	Arena Joondalup	7 July 2024	
2025	West Perth (4)	Claremont	7.6 (48) d. 4.6 (30)	Lathlain Park	24 August 2025	
2026	Swan Districts (2)	East Fremantle	5.4 (34) d. 4.9 (33)	Fremantle Oval	23 August 2026	

== See also ==
- List of West Australian Football League premiers

== Sources ==
- Official website
