= 2021 WAFL season =

Australian rules football season

- Teams: 10
- Premiers: Subiaco; 16th premiership
- Minor premiers: Subiaco; 18th minor premiership
- Bernie Naylor Medallist: Tyler Keitel; West Perth (64 goals)
- Highest: 29,879 (Grand Final, Subiaco vs South Fremantle)

The 2021 WAFL season (officially the 2021 Optus WAFL Premiership Season) is the 137th season of the various incarnations of the West Australian Football League (WAFL). The season commenced on 2 April and concluded with the Grand Final on 2 October. The West Coast Eagles reserves re-joined the competition, which increased the number of competing clubs to ten.

== Clubs ==
Club	Home ground	Location	2020 season
Claremont	Revo Fitness Stadium	Claremont	6-2 (Runners up)
East Fremantle	New Choice Homes Park	East Fremantle	1-7 (DNQ Finals)
East Perth	Leederville Oval	Leederville	4-4 (DNQ Finals)
Peel Thunder	David Grays Arena	Mandurah	0-8 (DNQ Finals)
Perth	Mineral Resources Park	Lathlain	5-3 (Semi-final)
South Fremantle	Fremantle Community Bank Oval	Fremantle	7-1 (Premiers)
Subiaco	Leederville Oval	Leederville	4-4 (DNQ Finals)
Swan Districts	Steel Blue Oval	Bassendean	3-5 (DNQ Final)
West Coast	Mineral Resources Park	Lathlain	Did not compete
West Perth	Provident Financial Oval	Joondalup	6-2 (Preliminary final)

== Fixtures ==
=== Round 1 ===
	Round 1
Friday 2 April (4:10 pm)	Peel Thunder 11.8 (74)	def. by	East Fremantle 15.16 (106)	David Grays Arena (crowd: 2,466)
Friday 2 April (4:10 pm)	Subiaco 15.14 (104)	def.	East Perth 11.10 (76)	Leederville Oval (crowd: 2,905)
Saturday 3 April (12:30 pm)	Perth 16.12 (108)	def.	West Coast 15.5 (95)	Mineral Resources Park (crowd: 1,321)
Saturday 3 April (2:10 pm)	South Fremantle 16.10 (106)	def.	West Perth 13.7 (85)	Fremantle Community Bank Oval (crowd: 2,445)
Saturday 3 April (2:10 pm)	Swan Districts 18.1 (109)	def. by	Claremont 20.13 (133)	Steel Blue Oval (crowd: 1,923)

=== Round 2 ===
	Round 2
Saturday 10 April (2:10 pm)	East Fremantle 8.5 (53)	def. by	Subiaco 12.14 (86)	New Choice Homes Park (crowd: 1,598)
Saturday 10 April (2:10 pm)	East Perth 7.7 (49)	def. by	Peel Thunder 24.10 (154)	Leederville Oval (crowd: 787)
Saturday 10 April (2:10 pm)	Claremont 17.6 (108)	def.	South Fremantle 13.14 (92)	Revo Fitness Stadium (crowd: 1,579)
Saturday 10 April (2:10 pm)	West Perth 19.6 (120)	def.	West Coast 6.6 (42)	Splendid Park (crowd: 3,000)
Saturday 10 April (5:10 pm)	Perth 6.13 (49)	def. by	Swan Districts 14.15 (99)	Mineral Resources Park (crowd: 1,650)

=== Round 3 ===
	Round 3
Saturday 17 April (2:10 pm)	East Fremantle 13.10 (88)	def.	East Perth 9.9 (63)	New Choice Homes Park (crowd: 1,242)
Saturday 17 April (2:10 pm)	Claremont 16.14 (110)	def.	Perth 12.6 (78)	Revo Fitness Stadium (crowd: 1,878)
Saturday 17 April (2:10 pm)	South Fremantle 17.6 (108)	def.	Peel Thunder 11.11 (77)	Pingelly Oval (crowd: 1,842)
Saturday 17 April (2:30 pm)	Swan Districts 13.16 (94)	def.	West Coast 8.7 (55)	Steel Blue Oval (crowd: 1,618)
Saturday 17 April (2:40 pm)	West Perth 14.7 (91)	def. by	Subiaco 14.10 (94)	Provident Financial Oval (crowd: 1,367)

=== Round 4 ===
	Round 4 (ANZAC Round)
~~Saturday 24 April (2:10 pm)~~	Peel Thunder	v	Claremont	David Grays Arena
~~Saturday 24 April (2:10 pm)~~	West Perth	v	East Fremantle	Provident Financial Oval
~~Saturday 24 April (2:30 pm)~~	Swan Districts	v	South Fremantle	Steel Blue Oval
~~Saturday 24 April (3:10 pm)~~	Subiaco	v	West Coast	Leederville Oval
~~Sunday 25 April (5:10 pm)~~	Perth	v	East Perth	Mineral Resources Park
All matches in Round 4 were cancelled due to a COVID-19 outbreak in Perth.

=== Round 5 ===
	Round 5
Saturday 1 May (2:10 pm)	East Perth 7.13 (55)	def. by	Swan Districts 10.8 (68)	Leederville Oval (crowd: 1,409)
Saturday 1 May (2:10 pm)	East Fremantle 6.8 (44)	def. by	Perth 11.8 (74)	New Choice Homes Park (crowd: 1,393)
Saturday 1 May (2:10 pm)	Claremont 16.11 (107)	def.	West Perth 8.7 (55)	Revo Fitness Stadium (crowd: 1,559)
Saturday 1 May (2:30 pm)	South Fremantle 12.8 (80)	def.	Subiaco 9.8 (62)	Fremantle Community Bank Oval (crowd: 1,918)
Sunday 2 May (11:10 am)	Peel Thunder 24.12 (156)	def.	West Coast 12.5 (77)	David Grays Arena (crowd: 380)

=== Round 6 ===
	Round 6
Saturday 8 May (2:10 pm)	Subiaco 13.16 (94)	def.	Claremont 7.12 (54)	Leederville Oval (crowd: 1,799)
Saturday 8 May (2:10 pm)	Perth 11.11 (77)	def. by	Peel Thunder 14.8 (92)	Mineral Resources Park (crowd: 1,268)
Saturday 8 May (2:10 pm)	West Perth 9.8 (62)	def.	Swan Districts 8.5 (53)	Provident Financial Oval (crowd: 1,674)
Saturday 8 May (2:10 pm)	South Fremantle 10.4 (64)	def.	East Perth 8.9 (57)	Fremantle Community Bank Oval (crowd: 1,542)
Saturday 8 May (2:10 pm)	East Fremantle 22.15 (147)	def.	West Coast 3.4 (22)	New Choice Homes Park (crowd: 812)

=== State game ===
	2021 State Game
Saturday 15 May (3:35 pm)	SANFL 20.10 (130)	def.	WAFL 11.11 (77)	Adelaide Oval
Simpson Medal (WAFL): Jye Bolton (Claremont); Fos Williams Medal (SANFL): Matthew Broadbent (South Adelaide)

=== Round 7 ===
	Round 7
Saturday 22 May (2:10 pm)	East Fremantle 6.10 (46)	def. by	Claremont 14.4 (88)	New Choice Homes Park (crowd: 1,251)
Saturday 22 May (2:10 pm)	Peel Thunder 7.10 (52)	def. by	West Perth 12.8 (80)	David Grays Arena (crowd: 720)
Saturday 22 May (2:10 pm)	Perth 11.8 (74)	def.	South Fremantle 7.12 (54)	Mineral Resources Park (crowd: 1,207)
Saturday 22 May (2:10 pm)	East Perth 12.13 (85)	def.	West Coast 3.10 (28)	Leederville Oval (crowd: 855)
Saturday 22 May (2:40 pm)	Swan Districts 7.8 (50)	def. by	Subiaco 8.10 (58)	Steel Blue Oval (crowd: 1,478)

=== Round 8 ===
	Round 8
Saturday 29 May (2:10 pm)	Subiaco 11.17 (83)	def.	Peel Thunder 5.9 (39)	Leederville Oval (crowd: 1,045)
Saturday 29 May (2:10 pm)	Claremont 14.12 (96)	def.	East Perth 9.6 (60)	Revo Fitness Stadium (crowd: 1,366)
Saturday 29 May (2:10 pm)	South Fremantle 20.7 (127)	def.	West Coast 9.7 (61)	Fremantle Community Bank Oval (crowd: 923)
Saturday 29 May (2:30 pm)	Swan Districts 16.9 (105)	def.	East Fremantle 8.13 (61)	Steel Blue Oval (crowd: 855)
Saturday 29 May (2:40 pm)	West Perth 5.8 (38)	def. by	Perth 7.6 (48)	Provident Financial Oval (crowd: 1,050)

=== Round 9 ===
	Round 9
Thursday 3 June (6:10 pm)	Perth 1.5 (11)	def. by	Subiaco 16.13 (109)	Mineral Resources Park (crowd: 1,059)
Saturday 5 June (12:10 pm)	Claremont 14.9 (93)	def.	West Coast 9.12 (66)	Revo Fitness Stadium (crowd: 1,238)
Saturday 5 June (2:10 pm)	Peel Thunder 7.17 (59)	def. by	Swan Districts 10.7 (67)	David Grays Arena (crowd: 1,241)
Monday 7 June (2:10 pm)	East Perth 11.10 (76)	def. by	West Perth 19.5 (119)	Leederville Oval (crowd: 3,631)
Monday 7 June (2:10 pm)	East Fremantle 8.10 (58)	def. by	South Fremantle 11.8 (74)	New Choice Homes Park (crowd: 5,914)

=== Round 10 ===
	Round 10
Saturday 12 June (2:10 pm)	Claremont 14.6 (90)	def.	Peel Thunder 12.11 (83)	Revo Fitness Stadium (crowd: 1,376)
Sunday 13 June (2:10 pm)	East Perth 8.11 (59)	def.	South Fremantle 8.6 (54)	Leederville Oval (crowd: 1,614)
	Bye; East Fremantle, Perth, Subiaco, Swan Districts, West Coast, West Perth

=== Round 11 ===
	Round 11
Saturday 19 June (2:10 pm)	Subiaco 11.10 (76)	def. by	West Coast 12.9 (81)	Leederville Oval (crowd: 1,567)
Saturday 19 June (2:10 pm)	Swan Districts 7.5 (47)	def. by	West Perth 14.9 (93)	Steel Blue Oval (crowd: 2,904)
Saturday 19 June (3:10 pm)	Perth 8.7 (55)	def. by	East Fremantle 12.9 (81)	Mineral Resources Park (crowd: 1,463)
	Bye; Claremont, East Perth, Peel Thunder, South Fremantle

=== Round 12 ===
	Round 12
Saturday 26 June (2:10 pm)	Subiaco 8.5 (53)	def. by	Swan Districts 7.12 (54)	Leederville Oval (crowd: 1,507)
Saturday 26 June (2:10 pm)	Peel Thunder 12.9 (81)	def. by	East Perth 13.10 (88)	David Grays Arena (crowd: 827)
Saturday 26 June (2:10 pm)	West Perth 10.10 (70)	def.	Claremont 8.8 (56)	Provident Financial Oval (crowd: 2,193)
Saturday 26 June (2:10 pm)	South Fremantle 15.5 (95)	def.	Perth 8.13 (61)	Fremantle Community Bank Oval (crowd: 2,853)
Saturday 26 June (2:10 pm)	East Fremantle 6.12 (48)	def. by	West Coast 15.9 (99)	New Choice Homes Park (crowd: 1,559)

=== Round 13 ===
	Round 13
~~Saturday 3 July (2:10 pm)~~	Claremont	v	Swan Districts	Revo Fitness Stadium
~~Saturday 3 July (2:10 pm)~~	Peel Thunder	v	Subiaco	David Grays Arena
~~Saturday 3 July (2:10 pm)~~	East Perth	v	East Fremantle	Leederville Oval
~~Saturday 3 July (2:10 pm)~~	Perth	v	West Perth	Mineral Resources Park
~~Saturday 3 July (2:10 pm)~~	South Fremantle	v	West Coast	Fremantle Community Bank Oval
All matches in Round 13 were cancelled due to a COVID-19 outbreak in Perth.

=== Round 14 ===
	Round 14 (NAIDOC Round)
Saturday 10 July (2:10 pm)	East Fremantle 9.8 (62)	def. by	Peel Thunder 13.10 (88)	New Choice Homes Park (crowd: 1,403)
Saturday 10 July (2:10 pm)	Subiaco 10.11 (71)	def.	Perth 6.8 (44)	Leederville Oval (crowd: 1,421)
Saturday 10 July (2:10 pm)	West Perth 14.13 (97)	def.	East Perth 10.7 (67)	Provident Financial Oval (crowd: 1,681)
Saturday 10 July (2:10 pm)	Swan Districts 10.11 (71)	def.	West Coast 9.15 (69)	Steel Blue Oval (crowd: 1,644)
Saturday 10 July (2:40 pm)	South Fremantle 11.2 (68)	def.	Claremont 9.13 (67)	Fremantle Community Bank Oval (crowd: 2,289)

=== Round 15 ===
	Round 15
Saturday 17 July (2:10 pm)	Subiaco 12.6 (78)	def.	West Coast 9.4 (58)	Leederville Oval (crowd: 1,142)
Saturday 17 July (2:10 pm)	West Perth 12.18 (90)	def.	East Fremantle 13.7 (85)	Provident Financial Oval (crowd: 1,754)
Saturday 17 July (2:10 pm)	Swan Districts 9.5 (59)	def. by	South Fremantle 15.5 (95)	Steel Blue Oval (crowd: 2,028)
Saturday 17 July (2:10 pm)	Perth 10.9 (69)	def. by	East Perth 11.12 (78)	Mineral Resources Park (crowd: 1,460)
Sunday 18 July (1:10 pm)	Peel Thunder 9.12 (66)	def. by	Claremont 11.9 (75)	David Grays Arena (crowd: 706)

=== Round 16 ===
	Round 16
Saturday 24 July (2:10 pm)	Claremont 14.12 (96)	def.	East Fremantle 7.11 (53)	Revo Fitness Stadium (crowd: 1,246)
Saturday 24 July (2:10 pm)	West Perth 12.10 (82)	def.	Peel Thunder 8.10 (58)	Provident Financial Oval (crowd: 1,093)
Saturday 24 July (2:10 pm)	East Perth 13.12 (90)	def. by	West Coast 14.8 (92)	Leederville Oval (crowd: 716)
Saturday 24 July (2:10 pm)	Swan Districts 13.13 (91)	def.	Perth 10.7 (67)	Steel Blue Oval (crowd: 2,339)
Sunday 25 July (2:10 pm)	Subiaco 10.13 (73)	def.	South Fremantle 4.5 (29)	Leederville Oval (crowd: 1,480)

=== Round 17 ===
	Round 17
Saturday 31 July (2:10 pm)	East Fremantle 7.4 (46)	def.	Swan Districts 5.9 (39)	New Choice Homes Park (crowd: 1,294)
Saturday 31 July (2:10 pm)	Subiaco 10.12 (72)	def.	West Perth 8.4 (52)	Leederville Oval (crowd: 1,346)
Saturday 31 July (2:10 pm)	Peel Thunder 3.7 (25)	def. by	South Fremantle 22.9 (141)	David Grays Arena (crowd: 997)
Saturday 31 July (2:10 pm)	Perth 6.7 (43)	def. by	West Coast 15.9 (99)	Mineral Resources Park (crowd: 1,312)
Sunday 1 August (2:10 pm)	East Perth 12.6 (78)	def.	Claremont 10.11 (71)	Leederville Oval (crowd: 1,480)

=== Round 18 ===
	Round 18
Saturday 7 August (2:10 pm)	Claremont 13.10 (88)	def. by	Subiaco 14.9 (93)	Revo Fitness Stadium (crowd: 1,609)
Saturday 7 August (2:10 pm)	Swan Districts 14.15 (99)	def.	Peel Thunder 7.5 (47)	Steel Blue Oval (crowd: 1,470)
Saturday 7 August (2:10 pm)	East Perth 9.12 (66)	def.	Perth 5.11 (41)	Leederville Oval (crowd: 1,304)
Saturday 7 August (2:10 pm)	South Fremantle 19.9 (123)	def.	East Fremantle 9.8 (62)	Fremantle Community Bank Oval (crowd: 2,670)
	Bye; West Coast, West Perth

=== Round 19 ===
	Round 19
Saturday 14 August (2:10 pm)	Subiaco 9.10 (64)	def. by	East Fremantle 16.12 (108)	Leederville Oval (crowd: 1,226)
Saturday 14 August (2:10 pm)	Swan Districts 14.11 (95)	def.	East Perth 8.6 (54)	Steel Blue Oval (crowd: 2,776)
Saturday 14 August (2:10 pm)	Perth 10.8 (66)	def. by	Claremont 11.10 (76)	Mineral Resources Park (crowd: 1,496)
Sunday 15 August (11:40 am)	West Perth 16.10 (106)	def.	West Coast 5.5 (35)	Provident Financial Oval (crowd: 1,208)
	Bye; Peel Thunder, South Fremantle

=== Round 20 ===
	Round 20
Saturday 21 August (2:10 pm)	East Perth 12.12 (84)	def. by	East Fremantle 13.8 (86)	Leederville Oval (crowd: 1,132)
Saturday 21 August (2:10 pm)	Peel Thunder 10.16 (76)	def.	West Coast 11.8 (74)	David Grays Arena (crowd: 532)
Sunday 22 August (1:10 pm)	West Perth 11.7 (73)	def.	South Fremantle 10.7 (67)	Provident Financial Oval (crowd: 1,410)
	Bye; Claremont, Perth, Subiaco, Swan Districts

=== Round 21 ===
	Round 21
Saturday 28 August (12:40 pm)	Peel Thunder 16.10 (106)	def.	Perth 10.3 (63)	David Grays Arena (crowd: 1,204)
Saturday 28 August (2:10 pm)	East Perth 11.5 (71)	def. by	Subiaco 12.13 (85)	Leederville Oval (crowd: 1,642)
Saturday 28 August (2:10 pm)	East Fremantle 20.3 (123)	def.	West Perth 9.23 (77)	New Choice Homes Park (crowd: 1,877)
Saturday 28 August (2:10 pm)	South Fremantle 10.16 (76)	def.	Swan Districts 11.5 (71)	Fremantle Community Bank Oval (crowd: 2,183)
Saturday 28 August (2:10 pm)	Claremont 19.15 (129)	def.	West Coast 4.9 (33)	Revo Fitness Stadium (crowd: 1,300)

=== Round 22 ===
	Round 22
Saturday 4 September (2:10 pm)	Claremont 11.11 (77)	def.	Swan Districts 8.7 (55)	Revo Fitness Stadium (crowd: 2,049)
Saturday 4 September (2:10 pm)	Peel Thunder 13.11 (89)	def. by	Subiaco 14.9 (93)	David Grays Arena (crowd: 1,130)
Saturday 4 September (2:10 pm)	Perth 10.5 (65)	def. by	West Perth 17.13 (115)	Mineral Resources Park (crowd: 1,808)
Saturday 4 September (2:10 pm)	South Fremantle 13.17 (95)	def.	West Coast 7.8 (50)	Fremantle Community Bank Oval (crowd: 1,588)
	Bye; East Fremantle, East Perth

== Ladder ==
Pos	Team	Pld	W	L	D	PF	PA	PP	Pts	Qualification
1	Subiaco (P)	18	14	4	0	1448	1128	128.4	56	Finals series
2	South Fremantle	18	13	5	0	1535	1182	129.9	52	Finals series
3	Claremont	18	13	5	0	1614	1267	127.4	52	Finals series
4	West Perth	18	12	6	0	1505	1253	120.1	48	Finals series
5	Swan Districts	18	10	8	0	1326	1209	109.7	40	Finals series
6	East Fremantle	18	8	10	0	1357	1401	96.9	32	
7	Peel Thunder	18	6	12	0	1422	1501	94.7	24	
8	East Perth	18	6	12	0	1256	1492	84.2	24	
9	Perth	18	4	14	0	1095	1519	72.1	16	
10	West Coast	18	4	14	0	1136	1742	65.2	16	

Updated to match(es) played on 5 September 2021. Source: WAFL.com.au
Rules for classification: (1) points; (2) percentage; (3) number of points for.
(P) Premiers

== Finals series ==
=== Qualifying and Elimination Finals ===
	Qualifying Final
Saturday 11 September (2:40 pm)	South Fremantle 9.11 (65)	def.	Claremont 9.10 (64)	Fremantle Community Bank Oval (crowd: 3,678)
Claremont co-captain Jared Hardisty had set shot after the final siren to win the game, but he missed and it sailed through for a behind.

	Elimination Final
Saturday 12 September (2:40 pm)	West Perth 14.6 (90)	def.	Swan Districts 13.8 (86)	Provident Financial Oval (crowd: 3,470)
West Perth kicked a goal in the 33rd minute of the last quarter to win the game by 4 points

=== Semi-finals ===
	Semi-finals
SF1: Saturday 18 September (2:40 pm)	Subiaco 11.7 (73)	def.	South Fremantle 8.3 (51)	Leederville Oval (crowd: 3,745)
SF2: Sunday 19 September (2:10 pm)	Claremont 14.8 (92)	def.	West Perth 10.8 (68)	Revo Fitness Stadium (crowd: 4,768)

=== Preliminary final ===
	Preliminary final
Sunday 26 September (2:40 pm)	South Fremantle 6.7 (43)	def.	Claremont 4.8 (32)	Fremantle Community Bank Oval (crowd: 4,664)

=== Grand Final ===
2021 WAFL Grand Final
Saturday 2 October (3:20 pm)	Subiaco	def.	South Fremantle	Optus Stadium (crowd: 29,879)	Report
2.2 (14); 5.4 (34); 9.6 (60); 13.7 (85)	Q1; Q2; Q3; Final	2.2 (14); 3.7 (25); 3.7 (25); 5.11 (41)	Umpires: T McPhee, R Shelton, B Laycock; Simpson Medal: Greg Clark; Television broadcast: Channel 7
H Marsh 3, G Clark 2, W Hickmott 2, Br Matera 2 M Braut 1, Ba Matera 1, J Mayo 1, B Sokol 1	Goals	T Abbott 1, T Blechynden 1, A Hall 1, J Motlop 1, M Shaw 1
G Clark W Hickmott A Dewar H Marsh K Stainsby C Harris	Best	B Higgins T McQuilkin G Wessels N Suban N Strom C Pearson
G Clark (shoulder).	Injuries	N Strom (head)

== See also ==
- List of WAFL premiers
- Australian rules football
- West Australian Football League
- Australian Football League
- 2021 AFL season
- 2021 WAFLW season
