= 2017 WAFL season =

Australian rules football season

- Teams: 9
- Premiers: Peel Thunder; 2nd premiership
- Minor premiers: Subiaco; 15th minor premiership
- Sandover Medallist: Haiden Schloithe; South Fremantle (52 votes)
- Bernie Naylor Medallist: Liam Ryan; Subiaco (71 goals)

The 2017 WAFL season was the 133rd season of the various incarnations of the West Australian Football League (WAFL). The season commenced on 18 March 2017 and concluded with the 2017 WAFL Grand Final on 24 September 2017.

== Ladder ==
2017 ladder
Pos	Team	Pld	W	L	D	PF	PA	PP	Pts
1	Subiaco	20	19	1	0	2061	1267	162.7	76
2	South Fremantle	20	16	4	0	2258	1419	159.1	64
3	Peel Thunder (P)	20	12	8	0	1479	1332	111.0	48
4	Swan Districts	20	10	10	0	1470	1662	88.4	40
5	West Perth	20	10	10	0	1594	1832	87.0	40
6	East Perth	20	9	11	0	1656	1604	103.2	36
7	Claremont	20	8	12	0	1641	1596	102.8	32
8	East Fremantle	20	3	17	0	1418	2054	69.0	12
9	Perth	20	3	17	0	1432	2243	63.8	12

Source: WAFL Footy Facts
Rules for classification: 1) points; 2) percentage; 3) number of points for.
(P) Premiers

For the full list of results for the home-and-away season, refer to the attached reference.

== Clubs ==
Club	Home ground	Location	Captain	Coach
Claremont	East Fremantle Oval; Fremantle Oval; Claremont Oval	Claremont	Jake Murphy	Darren Harris
East Fremantle	East Fremantle Oval	East Fremantle	Jamie McNamara	Robert Wiley
East Perth	Leederville Oval	Leederville	Patrick McGinnity	Luke Webster
Peel Thunder	Rushton Park	Mandurah	Gerald Ugle	Cam Shepherd
Perth	Lathlain Park	Lathlain	Clinton Jones	Earl Spalding
South Fremantle	Fremantle Oval	Fremantle	Ryan Cook	Todd Curley
Subiaco	Leederville Oval	Leederville	Kyal Horsley	Jarrad Schofield
Swan Districts	Bassendean Oval	Bassendean	Tallan Ames	Greg Harding
West Perth	Arena Joondalup	Joondalup	Jay van Berlo	Bill Monaghan

== Finals series ==
=== Elimination and Qualifying Finals ===
	Elimination Final
Sunday 2 September (2:40pm)	Swan Districts 11.9 (75)	def.	West Perth 8.12 (60)	Bassendean Oval (crowd: 5,637)	Report

	Qualifying Final
Saturday 2 September (2:10 pm)	South Fremantle 9.8 (62)	def. by	Peel Thunder 12.8 (80)	Fremantle Community Bank Oval (crowd: 3,493)	Report

=== Semi-finals ===
	First semi-final
Sunday 10 September (2:15 pm)	South Fremantle 20.16 (136)	def.	Swan Districts 8.8 (56)	Fremantle Community Bank Oval (crowd: 3,884)	Report

	Second semi-final
Sunday 10 September (2:15 pm)	Subiaco 10.8 (68)	def. by	Peel Thunder 14.8 (92)	Leederville Oval (crowd: 2,996)	Report

=== Preliminary final ===
	Preliminary final
Sunday 17 September (2:40 pm)	Subiaco 14.14 (98)	def.	South Fremantle 10.6 (66)	Leederville Oval (crowd: 4,097)	Report

=== Grand Final ===
2017 WAFL Grand Final
Sunday 24 September (2:50 pm)	Peel Thunder	def.	Subiaco	Domain Stadium (crowd: 18,180)
3.1 (19); 5.4 (34); 7.4 (46); 11.6 (72)	Q1; Q2; Q3; Final	2.2 (14); 4.7 (31); 6.13 (49); 7.14 (56)	Umpires: Matthew Adams, Justin Power, Trent McPhee; Simpson Medal: Luke Ryan (Peel Thunder); Television broadcast: Seven Network
Sheridan 2, Jetta 2, Taberner 2, Logue, Duman, Deluca, Ugle, Dawson 1	Goals	Sokol 4; Wheeler 2; Phelan 1
Darcy, Ryan, Nyhuis, Suban, Pearce, O'Brien, Taberner	Best	Horsley, Kitchin, Phelan, Sokol, Litherland, Heal, Baker
Peel Thunder won their second premiership in history. They also become the first team since 1993 to win a premiership after finishing 3rd on the ladder at the end of the home-and-away season.
