= 2007 WAFL season =

Australian rules football season

- Teams: 9
- Premiers: Subiaco; 10th premiership
- Minor premiers: Claremont; 12th minor premiership
- Sandover Medallist: Anthony Jones (Claremont)
- Bernie Naylor Medallist: Brad Smith (Subiaco)
- Matches played: 94

The 2007 WAFL season was the 123rd season of the various incarnations of the West Australian Football League. The season saw Subiaco, confounding the critics who expected them to slip after winning their second premiership in three years, win their second consecutive premiership for the first time in ninety-four seasons, with injury-plagued forward Brad Smith overcoming two reconstructions that wiped out 2005 and 2006 to kick 126 goals for the season, the most in the WAFL since Warren Ralph kicked 128 for Claremont in 1983. Smith also achieved the unique feat for a full-forward of winning the Simpson Medal in the Grand Final.

The top three teams between 2004 and 2006 – the Lions, Claremont and South Fremantle – maintained their tight grip in 2007, though there were notable improvements from East Fremantle, who had won a mere nineteen games between 2003 and 2006 but rose to nine victories in 2007, and East Perth, who returned to the finals for the first time in four seasons. Claremont won eighteen of nineteen matches after two opening losses before their inexperience told against the hardened Lions in the Grand Final, resulting in a short but quite steep fall in the following two seasons.

== Home-and-away season ==
=== Round 1 ===
	Round 1
Friday, 23 March (7:15 pm)	South Fremantle 13.4 (82)	def. by	East Fremantle 22.11 (143)	Fremantle Oval (crowd: 3739)
Saturday, 24 March (2:15 pm)	Perth 18.11 (119)	def. by	Swan Districts 20.8 (128)	Lathlain Park (crowd: 1982)
Saturday, 24 March (2:15 pm)	West Perth 14.14 (98)	def. by	East Perth 19.8 (122)	Arena Joondalup (crowd: 2511)
Saturday, 24 March (2:15 pm)	Subiaco 13.16 (94)	def.	Claremont 6.11 (47)	Leederville Oval (crowd: 1884)
	Bye; Peel Thunder
East Fremantle break a record sequence of thirteen straight losses against their derby rivals, with their previous win having been on Foundation Day of 2002.

=== Round 2 ===
	Round 2
Friday, 30 March (6:45 pm)	Subiaco 30.13 (193)	def.	South Fremantle 5.9 (39)	Leederville Oval (crowd: 1776)
Saturday, 31 March (2:15 pm)	Peel Thunder 10.10 (70)	def. by	Perth 11.26 (92)	Rushton Park (crowd: 1116)
Saturday, 31 March (2:15 pm)	Swan Districts 10.9 (69)	def. by	East Perth 16.23 (119)	Bassendean Oval (crowd: 2147)
Sunday, 1 April (2:15 pm)	Claremont 13.15 (93)	def. by	West Perth 14.14 (98)	Claremont Oval (crowd: 1864)
	Bye; East Fremantle
Subiaco’s 154-point win is their biggest over former rival South Fremantle and Bradley Smith’s thirteen goals a record for any Subiaco player against the Bulldogs

=== Round 3 (Easter weekend) ===
	Round 3
Saturday, 7 April (2:15 pm)	East Fremantle 12.23 (95)	def.	Peel Thunder 9.10 (64)	East Fremantle Oval (crowd: 1602)
Saturday, 7 April (2:15 pm)	West Perth 11.9 (75)	def. by	Subiaco 16.11 (107)	Arena Joondalup (crowd: 1964)
Monday, 9 April (2:15 pm)	East Perth 12.13 (85)	def. by	Claremont 13.13 (91)	Leederville Oval (crowd: 2801)
Monday, 9 April (2:15 pm)	South Fremantle 20.12 (132)	def. by	Swan Districts 19.20 (134)	Fremantle Oval (crowd: 2866)
	Bye; Perth

=== Round 4 ===
	Round 4
Saturday, 14 April (2:15 pm)	West Perth 14.11 (95)	def. by	South Fremantle 14.20 (104)	Arena Joondalup (crowd: 1546)
Saturday, 14 April (2:15 pm)	East Perth 23.17 (155)	def.	Peel Thunder 18.6 (114)	Leederville Oval (crowd: 1518)
Saturday, 14 April (2:15 pm)	Swan Districts 8.15 (63)	def. by	Subiaco 20.9 (129)	Bassendean Oval (crowd: 1878)
Saturday, 14 April (2:15 pm)	Perth 12.10 (82)	def. by	East Fremantle 19.9 (123)	Dongara (crowd: 1850)
	Bye; Claremont

=== Round 5 ===
	Round 5
Friday, 20 April (6:45 pm)	South Fremantle 15.10 (100)	def.	East Perth 10.10 (70)	Fremantle Oval (crowd: 1843)
Saturday, 21 April (2:15 pm)	East Fremantle 10.13 (73)	def. by	West Perth 10.18 (78)	East Fremantle Oval (crowd: 1857)
Saturday, 21 April (2:15 pm)	Peel Thunder 11.13 (79)	def. by	Claremont 12.14 (86)	Rushton Park (crowd: 1274)
Saturday, 21 April (2:15 pm)	Subiaco 17.16 (118)	def.	Perth 11.7 (73)	Leederville Oval (crowd: 2051)
	Bye; Swan Districts

=== Round 6 ===
	Round 6
Saturday, 28 April (2:15 pm)	Perth 13.10 (88)	def.	East Perth 11.11 (77)	Lathlain Park (crowd: 1682)
Saturday, 28 April (2:15 pm)	Swan Districts 13.15 (93)	def.	East Fremantle 9.19 (73)	Bassendean Oval (crowd: 1959)
Saturday, 28 April (2:15 pm)	Claremont 15.7 (97)	def.	South Fremantle 14.9 (93)	Claremont Oval (crowd: 1608)
Saturday, 28 April (2:15 pm)	Subiaco 28.14 (182)	def.	Peel Thunder 8.10 (58)	Leederville Oval (crowd: 1405)
	Bye; West Perth

=== Round 7 ===
	Round 7
Saturday, 5 May (2:15 pm)	Swan Districts 19.10 (124)	def.	West Perth 14.10 (94)	Bassendean Oval (crowd: 2217)
Saturday, 5 May (2:15 pm)	Perth 12.3 (75)	def. by	Claremont 15.11 (101)	Lathlain Park (crowd: 1341)
Saturday, 5 May (2:15 pm)	East Fremantle 10.15 (75)	def. by	Subiaco 18.13 (121)	East Fremantle Oval (crowd: 1364)
Saturday, 5 May (2:15 pm)	Peel Thunder 12.15 (87)	def. by	South Fremantle 17.19 (121)	Rushton Park (crowd: 1140)
	Bye; East Perth

=== Round 8 ===
	Round 8
Friday, 11 May (6:45 pm)	South Fremantle 28.12 (180)	def.	Perth 9.9 (63)	Fremantle Oval (crowd: 2827)
Saturday, 12 May (2:15 pm)	Claremont 22.15 (147)	def.	Swan Districts 10.14 (74)	Claremont Oval (crowd: 1672)
Saturday, 12 May (2:15 pm)	East Perth 11.8 (74)	def.	East Fremantle 8.12 (60)	Leederville Oval (crowd: 1869)
Saturday, 12 May (2:15 pm)	West Perth 21.17 (143)	def.	Peel Thunder 12.7 (79)	Arena Joondalup (crowd: 1373)
	Bye; Subiaco

=== Round 9 ===
	Round 9
Saturday, 19 May (2:15 pm)	East Fremantle 12.11 (83)	def. by	Claremont 14.14 (98)	East Fremantle Oval (crowd: 1339)
Saturday, 19 May (2:15 pm)	Perth 12.13 (85)	def. by	West Perth 18.9 (117)	Lathlain Park (crowd: 1706)
Saturday, 19 May (2:15 pm)	Peel Thunder 10.16 (76)	def.	Swan Districts 6.11 (47)	Bunbury (crowd: 1500)
Saturday, 19 May (2:15 pm)	Subiaco 13.11 (89)	def. by	East Perth 14.8 (92)	Leederville Oval (crowd: 1925)
	Bye; South Fremantle
East Perth’s thrilling come-from-behind win ends the third longest winning streak and fourth longest unbeaten streak in WAFL history.; The Royals’ comeback from a 47-point half-time deficit was them the third largest in league history, though they were to break this record later in 2007.; Swan Districts' score remained the lowest kicked by any opponent against Peel until round 9, 2015.

=== Round 10 (Foundation Day) ===
	Round 10
Saturday, 2 June (2:15 pm)	Swan Districts 17.12 (114)	def.	Perth 17.8 (110)	Bassendean Oval (crowd: 1854)
Monday, 4 June (2:15 pm)	East Fremantle 13.13 (91)	def. by	South Fremantle 15.15 (105)	East Fremantle Oval (crowd: 9737)
Monday, 4 June (2:15 pm)	Claremont 10.14 (74)	def. by	Subiaco 12.8 (80)	Claremont Oval (crowd: 2950)
Monday, 4 June (2:15 pm)	East Perth 9.14 (68)	def. by	West Perth 17.22 (124)	Leederville Oval (crowd: 4575)
	Bye; Peel Thunder

=== Round 11 ===
	Round 11
Saturday, 9 June (2:15 pm)	Perth 16.15 (111)	def.	Peel Thunder 11.9 (75)	Lathlain Park (crowd: 2294)
Saturday, 9 June (2:15 pm)	West Perth 17.6 (108)	def. by	Claremont 17.7 (109)	Arena Joondalup (crowd: 2850)
Saturday, 9 June (2:15 pm)	East Perth 17.8 (110)	def.	Swan Districts 14.12 (96)	Leederville Oval (crowd: 2116)
Saturday, 9 June (2:15 pm)	South Fremantle 20.14 (134)	def.	Subiaco 17.20 (122)	Fremantle Oval (crowd: 2149)
	Bye; East Fremantle

=== Round 12 ===
	Round 12
Saturday, 16 June (2:15 pm)	Peel Thunder 10.15 (75)	def. by	East Fremantle 14.9 (93)	Rushton Park (crowd: 1289)
Saturday, 16 June (2:15 pm)	Claremont 14.12 (96)	def.	East Perth 12.2 (74)	Claremont Oval (crowd: 2230)
Saturday, 16 June (2:15 pm)	Swan Districts 9.12 (66)	def. by	South Fremantle 28.9 (177)	Bassendean Oval (crowd: 2922)
Saturday, 16 June (2:15 pm)	Subiaco 16.19 (115)	def.	West Perth 14.10 (94)	Leederville Oval (crowd: 2717)
	Bye; Perth

=== Round 13 ===
	Round 13
Saturday, 23 June (2:15 pm)	East Fremantle 13.12 (90)	def.	Perth 6.9 (45)	East Fremantle Oval (crowd: 1190)
Saturday, 23 June (2:15 pm)	Subiaco 23.15 (153)	def.	Swan Districts 7.7 (49)	Leederville Oval (crowd: 1801)
Saturday, 23 June (2:15 pm)	Peel Thunder 13.12 (90)	def.	East Perth 11.6 (72)	Rushton Park (crowd: 1030)
Saturday, 23 June (2:15 pm)	South Fremantle 8.7 (55)	def. by	West Perth 7.15 (57)	Carnarvon (crowd: 2650)
	Bye; Claremont

=== Round 14 ===
	Round 14
Saturday, 30 June (2:15 pm)	Claremont 18.15 (123)	def.	Peel Thunder 8.12 (60)	Claremont Oval (crowd: 1117)
Saturday, 30 June (2:15 pm)	West Perth 14.11 (95)	def.	East Fremantle 9.21 (75)	Arena Joondalup (crowd: 1234)
Saturday, 30 June (2:15 pm)	Perth 7.12 (54)	def. by	Subiaco 23.19 (157)	Lathlain Park (crowd: 1295)
Saturday, 30 June (2:15 pm)	East Perth 13.13 (91)	def. by	South Fremantle 18.10 (118)	Leederville Oval (crowd: 1834)
	Bye; Swan Districts

=== Round 15 ===
	Round 15
Saturday, 7 July (2:15 pm)	Peel Thunder 19.14 (128)	def.	Subiaco 18.12 (120)	Rushton Park (crowd: 1071)
Saturday, 7 July (2:15 pm)	South Fremantle 13.14 (92)	def. by	Claremont 20.13 (133)	Fremantle Oval (crowd: 2990)
Saturday, 7 July (2:15 pm)	East Perth 13.14 (92)	def.	Perth 12.16 (88)	Leederville Oval (crowd: 1681)
Saturday, 7 July (2:15 pm)	East Fremantle 27.15 (177)	def.	Swan Districts 9.14 (68)	East Fremantle Oval (crowd: 1284)
	Bye; West Perth
For the first and only time in their history, Swan Districts lose three consecutive matches by over 100 points.

=== Round 16 ===
	Round 16
Friday, 13 July (6:45 pm)	South Fremantle 14.13 (97)	def.	Peel Thunder 10.12 (72)	Fremantle Oval (crowd: 2804)
Saturday, 14 July (2:15 pm)	Subiaco 19.20 (134)	def.	East Fremantle 11.9 (75)	Leederville Oval (crowd: 1845)
Saturday, 14 July (2:15 pm)	West Perth 13.12 (90)	def.	Swan Districts 8.17 (65)	Arena Joondalup (crowd: 1781)
Saturday, 14 July (2:15 pm)	Claremont 14.8 (92)	def.	Perth 12.13 (85)	Claremont Oval (crowd: 1502)
	Bye; East Perth

=== Round 17 ===
	Round 17
Saturday, 21 July (2:15 pm)	East Fremantle 13.17 (95)	def. by	East Perth 15.15 (105)	East Fremantle Oval (crowd: 1136)
Saturday, 21 July (2:15 pm)	Perth 4.19 (43)	def. by	South Fremantle 6.11 (47)	Lathlain Park (crowd: 1270)
Saturday, 21 July (2:15 pm)	Swan Districts 14.9 (93)	def. by	Claremont 14.14 (98)	Port Hedland (crowd: 1628)
Saturday, 21 July (2:15 pm)	Peel Thunder 8.15 (63)	def.	West Perth 8.13 (61)	Rushton Park (crowd: 920)
	Bye; Subiaco
East Perth’s comeback from a 49-point half-time deficit is the second largest in WAFL history, behind Swan Districts’ comeback from 51 points down in the opening round of 1986.; In one of the closest rounds in WAFL history with a combined margin of 21 points, Perth kick themselves out of the game with their most inaccurate score since kicking 4.22 (46) against East Fremantle in 1953.; Peel Thunder kick the lowest winning score in their history, and the only time they have won with a single-figure goal tally until Round 5, 2015 (Note: Up to round 4 of 2015, Peel's three lowest winning scores were all against the Falcons.)

=== Round 18 ===
	Round 18
Saturday, 28 July (2:15 pm)	West Perth 7.14 (56)	def. by	East Perth 13.14 (92)	Arena Joondalup (crowd: 1660)
Sunday, 29 July (2:15 pm)	Subiaco 12.14 (86)	def.	South Fremantle 11.8 (74)	Leederville Oval (crowd: 1956)
	Bye; Claremont, East Fremantle, Peel Thunder, Perth, Swan Districts

=== Round 19 ===
	Round 19
Saturday, 4 August (2:15 pm)	Swan Districts 13.12 (90)	def.	Peel Thunder 11.12 (78)	Bassendean Oval (crowd: 1894)
Saturday, 4 August (2:15 pm)	Claremont 12.13 (85)	def.	East Fremantle 10.12 (72)	Claremont Oval (crowd: 1674)
Saturday, 4 August (2:15 pm)	East Perth 5.8 (38)	def. by	Subiaco 22.16 (148)	Leederville Oval (crowd: 2244)
Saturday, 4 August (2:15 pm)	West Perth 16.7 (103)	def.	Perth 15.5 (95)	Arena Joondalup (crowd: 1500)
	Bye; South Fremantle

=== Round 20 ===
	Round 20
Friday, 10 August (6:45 pm)	South Fremantle 10.9 (69)	def. by	East Fremantle 12.16 (88)	Fremantle Oval (crowd: 2022)
Saturday, 11 August (2:15 pm)	Peel Thunder 17.9 (111)	def. by	East Perth 27.17 (179)	Rushton Park (crowd: 1124)
Saturday, 11 August (2:15 pm)	Claremont 14.13 (97)	def.	Subiaco 9.5 (59)	Claremont Oval (crowd: 2424)
Saturday, 11 August (2:15 pm)	Swan Districts 15.11 (101)	def.	Perth 12.17 (89)	Bassendean Oval (crowd: 2195)
	Bye; West Perth
Peel record their highest aggregate score on record of 290 points, beating their previous 2000 record against Swan Districts by nineteen. East Perth amazingly kick 7.11 (53) in the third quarter but 5.0 (30) in the last.

=== Round 21 ===
	Round 21
Friday, 17 August (6:45 pm)	South Fremantle 10.14 (74)	def. by	Swan Districts 11.15 (81)	Fremantle Oval (crowd: 2018)
Saturday, 18 August (2:15 pm)	Perth 16.7 (103)	def. by	Claremont 16.13 (109)	Lathlain Park (crowd: 1468)
Saturday, 18 August (2:15 pm)	East Fremantle 31.16 (202)	def.	Peel Thunder 12.8 (80)	East Fremantle Oval (crowd: 1201)
Sunday, 19 August (2:15 pm)	Subiaco 19.7 (121)	def.	West Perth 5.7 (37)	Leederville Oval (crowd: 1663)
	Bye; East Perth
East Fremantle record their second-highest open-age score on record and their highest since 1979 against West Perth.; Perth complete an amazing sequence of six losses by a combined margin of 41 points.

=== Round 22 ===
	Round 22
Saturday, 25 August (2:15 pm)	West Perth 12.11 (83)	def. by	South Fremantle 14.15 (99)	Arena Joondalup (crowd: 1423)
Saturday, 25 August (2:15 pm)	Peel Thunder 16.12 (108)	def.	Perth 14.7 (91)	Rushton Park (crowd: 1058)
Saturday, 25 August (2:15 pm)	Swan Districts 9.10 (64)	def. by	East Fremantle 11.17 (83)	Bassendean Oval (crowd: 2189)
Saturday, 25 August (2:15 pm)	East Perth 12.11 (83)	def. by	Claremont 24.17 (161)	Leederville Oval (crowd: 1745)
	Bye; Subiaco
South Fremantle seal their place in the finals by defeating the Falcons with a strong last-quarter burst; Peel consign Perth to their first wooden spoon since 2000 with this win leaving them two games clear despite Perth’s better percentage.

=== Round 23 ===
	Round 23
Saturday, 1 September (2:15 pm)	East Perth 26.12 (168)	def.	Swan Districts 13.8 (86)	Leederville Oval (crowd: 1630)
Saturday, 1 September (2:15 pm)	Perth 11.5 (71)	def. by	Subiaco 23.11 (149)	Lathlain Park (crowd: 1795)
Saturday, 1 September (2:15 pm)	Claremont 21.13 (139)	def.	Peel Thunder 14.9 (93)	Claremont Oval (crowd: 1411)
Saturday, 1 September (2:15 pm)	East Fremantle 11.16 (82)	def. by	West Perth 14.13 (97)	East Fremantle Oval (crowd: 1816)
	Bye; South Fremantle

== Ladder ==
2007 WAFL ladder
Pos	Team	Pld	W	L	D	PF	PA	PP	Pts
1	Claremont	20	17	3	0	2076	1683	123.4	68
2	Subiaco (P)	20	16	4	0	2477	1447	171.2	64
3	South Fremantle	20	11	9	0	1992	1895	105.1	44
4	East Perth	20	11	9	0	1966	1978	99.4	44
5	West Perth	20	10	10	0	1803	1826	98.7	40
6	East Fremantle	20	9	11	0	1948	1714	113.7	36
7	Swan Districts	20	8	12	0	1705	2296	74.3	32
8	Peel Thunder	20	5	15	0	1660	2299	72.2	20
9	Perth	20	3	17	0	1662	2151	77.3	12

Rules for classification: 1) points; 2) percentage; 3) number of points for.
(P) Premiers

== Finals ==
=== First semi-final ===
	First semi-final
Sunday, 9 September (2:15 pm)	South Fremantle 16.10 (106)	def.	East Perth 8.9 (57)	Fremantle Oval (crowd: 3,527)

=== Second semi-final ===
	Second semi-final
Sunday, 9 September (2:15 pm)	Claremont 16.13 (109)	def.	Subiaco 14.10 (94)	Claremont Oval (crowd: 3,722)

=== Preliminary final ===
	Preliminary final
Sunday, 16 September (2:15 pm)	Subiaco 25.14 (164)	def.	South Fremantle 10.9 (69)	Subiaco Oval (crowd: 5,511)
Seventeen-year-old rover Daniel Rich dominates around the ground to crush the Bulldogs, who kick only 3.5 (23) to 17.9 (111) after half-time.

This was also the last preliminary final held at Subiaco Oval. From 2008 it was moved to the loser of the major semi final.

=== Grand Final ===
2007 WAFL Grand Final
Sunday 23 September	Claremont	def. by	Subiaco	Subiaco Oval (crowd: 19,541)
0.0 (0); 5.2 (32); 7.4 (46); 9.8 (62)	Q1; Q2; Q3; Final	4.4 (28); 8.5 (53); 13.8 (86); 15.13 (103)	Umpires: Gavin Statham, Todd Keating, Greg Bandy; Simpson Medal: Brad Smith (Subiaco)
Chad Jones 3, Anthony Jones 2, Rudeforth, Matson, Browne Crabb	Goals	Brad Smith 7, Pickett 2, Rich 2, Larkins 2, Nicoski, Marty smith
Crabb, Browne, Wilkes, Schammer, Franz, Rudeforth	Best	Brad Smith, Pickett, Nicowski, Rumble, Rich, Webb, Hall
Injuries	Broughton (hamstring); Webb (head)
Two medals in the Grand Final cap an amazing comeback for Brad Smith and give Subiaco a thoroughly deserved premiership.
