= Rory O'Brien (Australian rules footballer) =

Australian rules footballer

Personal information
- Full name: Rory O'Brien
- Born: 28 June 1986 (age 40)
- Original team: Pinjarra Junior Football Club
- Height: 172 cm (5 ft 8 in)
- Weight: 80 kg (176 lb)
- Position: Midfielder

Club information
- Current club: Peel Thunder Football Club
- Number: 3

Playing career^{1}
Years	Club	Games (Goals)
2005–07, 2009–10, 2016 –	Peel Thunder	92 (85)
2008	North Adelaide	16 (16)
2011–2015	East Fremantle	105 (54)
Total		213 (155)

Representative team honours
Years	Team	Games (Goals)
2011, 2013	Western Australia	2 (1)
- ^{1} Playing statistics correct to the end of 2015.

Career highlights
- Sandover Medal (2013); Peel best and fairest: 2006, 2010; East Fremantle best and fairest: 2011, 2013 (joint), 2014

Rory O'Brien (born 28 June 1986) is an Australian rules footballer currently playing for the Peel Thunder Football Club in the West Australian Football League (WAFL). He is the older brother of Brock O'Brien.

O'Brien made his league debut for Peel Thunder in round 1 of the 2005 season and was voted the club's best and fairest player in 2006. He spent the 2008 season at North Adelaide Football Club in the South Australian National Football League, before returning to Peel Thunder in 2009. After winning Peel's best and fairest award for a second time in 2010, he transferred to East Fremantle for the 2011 season. 2011 also saw O'Brien make his state debut for Western Australia.

During his time at East Fremantle, O'Brien has been awarded the Lynn Medal for the club's best and fairest on three occasions; in 2011 and 2014 he was the sole winner, while he shared the award with Andrew Stephen in 2013. In 2013, O'Brien won the Sandover Medal for the best and fairest player in the WAFL with 55 votes.

After five years and 105 games with East Fremantle, O'Brien returned to his original club Peel Thunder for the 2016 season.
