= Peel Thunder Football Club =

Australian rules football club

Peel Thunder

Names
- Full name: Peel Thunder Football Club
- Nickname: Thunder

2026 season
- After finals: 1st
- Home-and-away season: 1st (WAFL); 9th (WAFLW)
- Leading goalkicker: Charlie Nicholls

Club details
- Founded: 1996; 30 years ago
- Colours: Dark blue White Teal
- Competition: West Australian Football League
- Coach: Adam Read (WAFL)
- Captain: Jack Sears (WAFL)
- Premierships: WAFL (4): 2016, 2017, 2024, 2026; WAFLW (2): 2020, 2021
- Ground: Rushton Park (capacity: 10,000)

Uniforms
Home

Other information
- Official website: peelthunder.com.au

The Peel Thunder Football Club is an Australian rules football club playing in the West Australian Football League (WAFL) and WAFL Women's (WAFLW). The team is based in Mandurah, Western Australia, with their home ground being Rushton Park. The club joined the WAFL as an expansion team in 1997.

Since 2014 Peel have been in a formal alignment with the Fremantle Dockers of the Australian Football League, an arrangement which sees Fremantle's reserve players play for Peel.

== History ==
Peel Thunder Football Club was formed in 1996 after the West Australian Football Commission (WAFC) granted a ninth licence in the WAFL to the Mandurah-Peel region. The licence was issued on the condition that the club be ready to compete in the 1997 Westar Rules season. Geoff Miles was appointed as the club's inaugural coach and Phil Gilbert appointed captain. The Thunder managed just one win in 1997 and finished last on the ladder, with Scott Simister winning the inaugural best and fairest. They managed another one-win season in 1998, before going winless in 1999.

In March 2011, the club was fined $10,000 for breaching salary cap rules involving player payments to midfielder Rory O'Brien during the 2009 season.

Between 1997 and 2014, the Thunder failed to qualify for the finals, with their best season coming in 2008 when they recorded an 8–12 win–loss record and a sixth-place finish. During that time, they collected nine wooden spoons, including three in a row twice (1997–99 & 2011–13), and finished second last seven times.

In 2014, Peel became directly aligned with the Fremantle Dockers of the Australian Football League, an arrangement which saw Fremantle's reserve players playing exclusively for Peel in the WAFL for the first time. In 2015, the second season of this arrangement, Peel qualified for the finals for the first time in its history, finishing third on the ladder with a club-best record of 13–7. Due to Fremantle's decision to rest a host of its key AFL players ahead of their finals campaign, the majority of Peel's usual Fremantle contingent was called up for AFL duties, which impacted Peel's ability to field a competitive team against West Perth in the qualifying final. As a result, Peel was blown out of the water by West Perth, losing their first finals game 145–36. Despite regaining many of their Fremantle players for their semi-final clash against East Perth the following week, they were knocked out of the finals with an 84–62 defeat at the hands of the Royals.

In 2016, the Thunder finished the home and away season in fourth place on the ladder with an 11–9 record. Despite a drop off from 2015, Peel headed into the WAFL finals with a huge boost thanks to Fremantle's poor season in 2016. With Fremantle missing the finals in 2016, it provided Peel with a huge contingent of players for their finals campaign. Behind 17 Docker-listed players, the Thunder won three do-or-die finals in a row against East Perth, West Perth and South Fremantle respectively to reach their first ever WAFL grand final. In the grand final, Peel defeated Subiaco by 23 points to win their first WAFL premiership. Peel's midfield had too much running power and grunt inside for Subiaco, with Docker Connor Blakely winning the Simpson Medal on the back of 38 possessions. Fellow Docker Ed Langdon was also an important contributor with 39 disposals, eight marks and a goal.

Peel were a foundation member of the WAFL Women's competition in 2019. The club recorded their first senior women's premiership in the competition in the 2020 season.

== Honour board ==
Season	Position	Win–Loss	Finals result	Coach	Captain	Dudley Tuckey Medal	Leading goalkicker
1997	9th	1–19	DNQ	Geoff Miles	Phil Gilbert	Scott Simister	Scott Simister (27)
1998	9th	1–19	DNQ	Geoff Miles; Troy Wilson	Phil Gilbert	Darren Bolton	Scott Simister ^{(2)} (31)
1999	9th	0–20	DNQ	Troy Wilson	Scott Simister	Scott Simister ^{(2)}	Scott Simister ^{(3)} (54)
2000	8th	4–14	DNQ	Shane Cable	Bill Monaghan	Vance Davison	Dean Buszan (32)
2001	6th	7–11	DNQ	Shane Cable	Vance Davison	Derek Hall	David McPharlin (25)
2002	8th	7–11	DNQ	Peter German	Derek Hall	Darren Bolton ^{(2)}	Scott Simister ^{(4)} (46)
2003	9th	1–19	DNQ	John Ditchburn	Derek Hall	Derek Hall ^{(2)}	Derek Hall (22)
2004	8th	5–15	DNQ	Garry Hocking	Brandon Hill	Daniel Haines	Cameron Gauci (40)
2005	9th	3–17	DNQ	Garry Hocking	Grant Welsh	Pat Travers	Justin Wood (29)
2006	8th	6–14	DNQ	Chris Waterman	Grant Welsh	Rory O'Brien	Dean Buszan (44)
2007	8th	5–15	DNQ	Chris Waterman	Grant Welsh	Daniel Haines ^{(2)}	Dean Buszan ^{(2)} (30)
2008	6th	8–12	DNQ	Chris Waterman	Grant Welsh	Hayden Ballantyne	Hayden Ballantyne (75)
2009	9th	5–15	DNQ	Chris Waterman	Daniel Haines	Ben Howlett	Kain Robins (33)
2010	8th	3–17	DNQ	Trevor Williams	Daniel Haines; Brendon Jones	Rory O'Brien ^{(2)}	Matthew Battye (27)
2011	9th	5–15	DNQ	Trevor Williams	Brendon Jones	Kristin Thornton	Bradley Holmes (36)
2012	9th	5–15	DNQ	Trevor Williams; Mark Moody	Brendon Jones	Brendon Jones	Bradley Holmes ^{(2)} (52)
2013	9th	3–17	DNQ	Cam Shepherd	Brendon Jones	Viv Michie	Bradley Holmes ^{(3)} (33)
2014	8th	4–16	DNQ	Cam Shepherd	James Flaherty	Brendon Jones ^{(2)}	Matt Taberner (18)
2015	3rd	13–7	Semi Finalists	Cam Shepherd	Brendon Jones	Jacob Ballard	Leroy Jetta (39)
2016	4th	11–9	Premiers	Cam Shepherd	Gerald Ugle	Matt de Boer	Gerald Ugle (24)
2017	3rd	12–8	Premiers	Cam Shepherd	Gerald Ugle	Sam Collins	Matt Taberner ^{(2)} (41)
2018	7th	7–11	DNQ	Cam Shepherd	Gerald Ugle	Danyle Pearce; Ben Howlett ^{(2)}	Gerald Ugle ^{(2)} Luke Strnadica (17)
2019	7th	7–11	DNQ	Cam Shepherd	Ben Howlett	Bailey Banfield	Blair Bell (26)
2020	9th	0–8	DNQ	Cam Shepherd	Ben Howlett	Jackson Merrett	Hayden Ballantyne ^{(2)} (10)
2021	7th	6–12	DNQ	Cam Shepherd	Ben Howlett	Tyrone Thorne	Blair Bell ^{(2)} (19)
2022	5th	11–7	Semi Finalists	Geoff Valentine	Ben Hancock	Lloyd Meek	Blair Bell ^{(3)} (24)
2023	3rd	12–6	Runners Up	Geoff Valentine	Ben Hancock	Blair Bell	Sebit Kuek (25)
2024	2nd	13–5	Premiers	Adam Read	Ben Hancock	Neil Erasmus	Nathan Wilson (34)
2025	6th	7–10–1	DNQ	Adam Read	Ben Hancock	Liam Reidy	Jack Delean (21)
2026	1st	13-5-0	Premiers	Adam Read	Jack Sears	Hugh Davies	Charlie Nicholls (33)

== Honours ==
=== Club honours ===
Premierships
Competition	Level	Wins	Years won
West Australian Football League	Men's Seniors	4	2016, 2017, 2024, 2026
West Australian Football League	Women's Seniors	2	2020, 2021
West Australian Football League	Women's Reserves (2019–2022)	1	2021
West Australian Football League	Colts (Boys U19)	3	2004, 2005, 2022
West Australian Football League	Rogers Cup (Girls U19)	5	2014, (Note: Premiership won as the "Peel Thunderbirds". The name was changed to "Peel Thunder" in 2019.) 2015, 2016, 2018, 2019
Other titles and honours
Rodriguez Shield	Multiple	0	Nil
Finishing positions
West Australian Football League	Runners-up (men's seniors)	1	2023
West Australian Football League	Minor premiership (men's seniors)	1	2026
West Australian Football League	Wooden spoons (men's seniors)	10	1997, 1998, 1999, 2003, 2005, 2009, 2011, 2012, 2013, 2020
West Australian Football League	Wooden spoons (women's seniors)	3	2019, 2024, 2026

=== Individual honours ===
- Sandover Medallists: (2) 2002: Allistair Pickett, 2008: Hayden Ballantyne
- Simpson Medallists: (4) 2016: Connor Blakely, 2017: Luke Ryan, 2024: Neil Erasmus, 2026: Jeremy Sharp

== Records ==
- Highest score: Round 11, 2001 – 23.11 (149) vs. Swan Districts at Bendigo Bank Stadium
- Lowest score (official): Round 1, 2004 – 0.0 (0) vs. Claremont at Rushton Park – the team's on-field score of 10.10 (70) was annulled for playing Peter Bird with an invalid permit
- Lowest score (on-field) : Round 16, 2016 – 1.5 (11) vs. West Perth
- Greatest winning margin: Round 6, 2024 – 113 points vs. West Perth at Lane Group Stadium
- Greatest losing margin: Round 3, 1999 – 195 points vs. South Fremantle at Fremantle Oval

Source: WAFL.com.au

== AFL draftees ==
The following is a list of Peel Thunder players who have been drafted to clubs in the Australian Football League (AFL). Players currently on an AFL list are listed in bold:

Draft	Pick	Player	Drafted by
1998N	10	Brandon Hill	West Coast
1999R	2	Darren Bolton	Fremantle
2000R	49	Dale Walkingshaw	Fremantle
2001R	4	Dean Buszan	West Coast
2001R	36	Daniel Haines	Fremantle
2002N	2	Daniel Wells	North Melbourne
2003N	4	Farren Ray	Western Bulldogs
2005R	5	Ryan Nye	Adelaide
2005R	40	Ashley Thornton	West Coast
2005N	20	Paul Bower	Carlton
2005N	28	Matt Riggio	North Melbourne
2005N	54	Kristin Thornton	Sydney
2006N	2	Scott Gumbleton	Essendon
2006N	38	James Hawksley	Brisbane Lions
2006N	47	Kyle Reimers	Essendon
2006N	52	Brock O'Brien	Fremantle
2007R	18	Danny Chartres	Essendon
2008N	21	Hayden Ballantyne	Fremantle
2009R	12	Kristin Thornton	Sydney
2009R	42	Johnny Bennell	Collingwood
2009N	4	Anthony Morabito	Fremantle
2009N	25	Aaron Black	North Melbourne
2010R	20	Ben Howlett	Essendon
2010N	2	Harley Bennell	Gold Coast
2011P	2	Blayne Wilson	West Coast
2011R	48	Kelvin Lawrence	Melbourne
2012N	31	Kamdyn McIntosh	Richmond
2015R	24	Brad Walsh	Carlton
2017N	9	**Aaron Naughton**	Western Bulldogs
2018R	12	Durak Tucker	Sydney
2019R	6	Jarvis Pina	Fremantle
2020N	57	Isiah Winder	West Coast
2021N	31	**Brady Hough**	West Coast
2021R	36	**Sandy Brock**	Gold Coast
2022MSD	5	**Wade Derksen**	Greater Western Sydney
2022N	38	**Jed Adams**	Melbourne
2023N	32	**Mitchell Edwards**	Geelong
2023N	38	**Clay Hall**	West Coast
2023N	64	**Reece Torrent**	Brisbane Lions
2024MSD	2	Jacob Blight	Richmond
2024N	16	**Bo Allan**	West Coast
2025MSD	5	**Michael Sellwood**	Western Bulldogs

Source: PeelThunder.com.au
