= 2002 WAFL season =

Australian rules football season

- Teams: 9
- Premiers: East Perth; 17th premiership
- Minor premiers: East Perth; 17th minor premiership
- Sandover Medallist: Allistair Pickett (Peel Thunder)
- Bernie Naylor Medallist: Zane Parsons (South Fremantle)
- Matches played: 85

The 2002 WAFL season was the 118th season of the West Australian Football League. It saw East Perth, despite the end of the first host club scheme that was thought to have unfairly favoured the Royals, win their third successive premiership for the first hat-trick in the WA(N)FL since Swan Districts between 1982 and 1984. The Swans themselves had a disastrous season as chronic financial troubles, which had plagued the club for almost a decade were combined with disastrous results on the field. The black and whites were within two points of a winless season in the seniors and did little better in the lower grades.

Cinderella club Peel Thunder, despite going within two minutes of the first goalless score in senior WAFL football for over eighty-six years and being voted out of the competition by seven of the other eight clubs at a meeting to extend their licence on 6 May, achieved their best overall record to date and their first tangible honours as diminutive on-baller Allistair Pickett won the Sandover Medal. The Thunder, remarkably, provided in Daniel Wells the joint runner-up in the Medal as well as the winner. The loss of these players, and of financial support given to prevent Peel from folding, was to see the Thunder after three years of relatively promising on-field form including wins against three finalists in 2002 again hit rock-bottom the following season. The league’s most famous club, East Fremantle, aided by two lower grade premierships from 2001, rebounded from their disastrous senior record that season to make the finals aided by the only ruck division able to rival the Royals, but this was to be their last finals appearance for the decade. During the ensuing four seasons the Sharks reached depths not experienced at any point during the twentieth century, winning a mere nineteen of eighty matches.

Even apart from Peel’s near-goalless score, 2002 was notable for low scoring, with the high score of 22.13 (145) the lowest in the WAFL since 1927, and the average of 80.83 points the lowest since 1954, in an era when Perth received rainfall much greater than under present-day greenhouse gas concentrations.

== Home-and-away season ==
=== Round 1 (Easter weekend) ===
	Round 1
Saturday, 30 March (2:15 pm)	East Fremantle 7.7 (49)	def. by	South Fremantle 13.16 (94)	East Fremantle Oval (crowd: 2384)
Saturday, 30 March (2:15 pm)	Peel Thunder 7.9 (51)	def. by	Perth 9.15 (69)	Rushton Park (crowd: 1134)
Saturday, 30 March (2:15 pm)	Swan Districts 7.5 (47)	def. by	Subiaco 7.18 (60)	Bassendean Oval (crowd: 2163)
Monday, 1 April (2:15 pm)	East Perth 19.8 (122)	def.	West Perth 6.10 (46)	Leederville Oval (crowd: 3896)
	Bye; Claremont

=== Round 2 ===
	Round 2
Saturday, 6 April (2:15 pm)	West Perth 6.10 (46)	def. by	East Fremantle 13.9 (87)	Arena Joondalup (crowd: 1176)
Saturday, 6 April (2:15 pm)	Subiaco 13.11 (89)	def.	East Perth 13.10 (88)	Subiaco Oval (crowd: 1441)
Saturday, 6 April (2:15 pm)	Claremont 14.17 (101)	def.	Peel Thunder 11.3 (69)	Claremont Oval (crowd: 1276)
	Bye; Perth, South Fremantle, Swan Districts
Subiaco’s acquisition of David Sierakowski, David Haynes and Josh Wooden due to the end of the host club scheme helps it come back from five goals down to beat the two-time premiers.

=== Round 3 ===
	Round 3
Saturday, 13 April (2:15 pm)	Swan Districts 9.7 (61)	def. by	East Perth 13.12 (90)	Bassendean Oval (crowd: 2361)
Saturday, 13 April (2:15 pm)	South Fremantle 9.7 (61)	def. by	Claremont 10.18 (78)	Fremantle Oval (crowd: 1425)
Saturday, 13 April (2:15 pm)	Perth 13.10 (88)	def. by	West Perth 15.16 (106)	Lathlain Park (crowd: 1540)
	Bye; East Fremantle, Peel Thunder, Subiaco

=== Round 4 ===
	Round 4
Saturday, 20 April (2:15 pm)	East Fremantle 12.16 (88)	def.	Swan Districts 7.15 (57)	East Fremantle Oval (crowd: 1440)
Saturday, 20 April (2:15 pm)	Claremont 8.8 (56)	def. by	West Perth 12.8 (80)	Claremont Oval (crowd: 1470)
Saturday, 20 April (2:15 pm)	Perth 6.13 (49)	def. by	Subiaco 13.17 (95)	Jurien Bay (crowd: 1700)
Saturday, 20 April (2:15 pm)	Peel Thunder 15.10 (100)	def.	South Fremantle 10.10 (70)	Rushton Park (crowd: 1916)
	Bye; East Perth

=== Round 5 (Anzac Day) ===
	Round 5
Thursday, 25 April (2:15 pm)	West Perth 13.13 (91)	def.	Peel Thunder 9.12 (66)	Arena Joondalup (crowd: 2104)
Saturday, 27 April (2:15 pm)	Swan Districts 6.4 (40)	def. by	Perth 13.11 (89)	Bassendean Oval (crowd: 1968)
Sunday, 28 April (2:15 pm)	Subiaco 12.13 (85)	def.	Claremont 12.10 (82)	Subiaco Oval (crowd: 1788)
Sunday, 28 April (2:15 pm)	East Perth 7.13 (55)	def.	East Fremantle 7.10 (52)	Leederville Oval (crowd: 2348)
	Bye; South Fremantle
Despite losing Brett Cousins and key defender Phil Smith, and kicking two goals to half-time, West Perth recover to maintain a perfect record against Peel.; East Perth become the first team to win after being goalless at half-time since Perth, with an identical first-half score of 0.6 (6), beat Swan Districts 5.11 (41) to 3.12 (30) in 1973. The Royals’ win was the more remarkable for lacking Troy Butcher, Devan Perry, Judd Lalich and Michael Prior.

=== Round 6 ===
	Round 6
Friday, 3 May (6:45 pm)	South Fremantle 12.9 (81)	def. by	West Perth 12.10 (82)	Fremantle Oval (crowd: 2392)
Saturday, 4 May (2:15 pm)	Perth 9.13 (67)	def. by	East Perth 12.18 (90)	Lathlain Park (crowd: 2215)
Saturday, 4 May (2:15 pm)	Claremont 16.9 (105)	def.	Swan Districts 9.10 (64)	Claremont Oval (crowd: 1180)
Saturday, 4 May (2:15 pm)	Peel Thunder 11.4 (70)	def. by	Subiaco 11.18 (84)	Rushton Park (crowd: 2068)
	Bye; East Fremantle

=== Round 7 ===
	Round 7
Friday, 10 May (6:45 pm)	Subiaco 6.11 (47)	def. by	South Fremantle 8.6 (54)	Subiaco Oval (crowd: 1584)
Saturday, 11 May (2:15 pm)	East Fremantle 10.14 (74)	def.	Perth 9.5 (59)	East Fremantle Oval (crowd: 1379)
Saturday, 11 May (2:15 pm)	Swan Districts 15.14 (104)	def.	Peel Thunder 15.12 (102)	Bassendean Oval (crowd: 1140)
Sunday, 12 May (2:15 pm)	East Perth 9.15 (69)	def.	Claremont 9.11 (65)	Leederville Oval (crowd: 1556)
	Bye; West Perth
Swan Districts win their only game after a fifty-metre penalty to Craig de Corsey for an off-the ball incident not seen by the crowd gives them an easy goal.

=== Round 8 ===
	Round 8
Saturday, 18 May (2:15 pm)	Peel Thunder 17.5 (107)	def. by	East Perth 18.17 (125)	Rushton Park (crowd: 1904)
Saturday, 18 May (2:15 pm)	South Fremantle 17.8 (110)	def.	Swan Districts 10.11 (71)	Wickepin (crowd: 1453)
Saturday, 18 May (2:15 pm)	Claremont 9.17 (71)	def.	East Fremantle 9.8 (62)	Claremont Oval (crowd: 1341)
Saturday, 18 May (2:15 pm)	West Perth 7.10 (52)	def. by	Subiaco 9.13 (67)	Arena Joondalup (crowd: 1801)
	Bye; Perth
Nine goals from Zac Parsons and a superb effort from rangy follower-turned winger Daniel Gilmore ensures South Fremantle win at Wickepin in the Wheatbelt.; A depleted East Perth comes from 33 points behind to beat an accurate Peel with only Todd Ridley as a recognised forward.

=== Round 9 ===
	Round 9
Saturday, 25 May (2:15 pm)	East Perth 20.14 (134)	def.	South Fremantle 11.9 (75)	Leederville Oval (crowd: 2378)
Saturday, 25 May (2:15 pm)	East Fremantle 20.15 (135)	def.	Peel Thunder 10.14 (74)	East Fremantle Oval (crowd: 1121)
Saturday, 25 May (2:15 pm)	Swan Districts 13.9 (87)	def. by	West Perth 16.15 (111)	Bassendean Oval (crowd: 2000)
Saturday, 25 May (2:15 pm)	Perth 12.13 (85)	def.	Claremont 7.9 (51)	Lathlain Park (crowd: 1637)
	Bye; Subiaco

=== Round 10 (Foundation Day) ===
	Round 10
Saturday, 1 June (2:15 pm)	Subiaco 19.11 (125)	def.	Swan Districts 3.11 (29)	Subiaco Oval (crowd: 1850)
Saturday, 1 June (2:15 pm)	Peel Thunder 17.12 (114)	def.	Perth 17.10 (112)	Rushton Park (crowd: 3866)
Monday, 3 June (2:15 pm)	South Fremantle 6.10 (46)	def. by	East Fremantle 11.17 (83)	Fremantle Oval (crowd: 5064)
Monday, 3 June (2:15 pm)	West Perth 13.15 (93)	def.	East Perth 13.9 (87)	Arena Joondalup (crowd: 3094)
	Bye; Claremont
Swan Districts kick their lowest score against Subiaco, beating out 4.10 (34) from 1964.

=== Round 11 ===
	Round 11
Saturday, 8 June (2:15 pm)	East Perth 20.10 (130)	def.	Subiaco 12.10 (82)	Leederville Oval (crowd: 2425)
Saturday, 8 June (2:15 pm)	Perth 12.9 (81)	def.	South Fremantle 10.15 (75)	Lathlain Park (crowd: 1719)
Saturday, 8 June (2:15 pm)	East Fremantle 12.12 (84)	def. by	West Perth 18.7 (115)	East Fremantle Oval (crowd: 1454)
Saturday, 8 June (2:15 pm)	Claremont 14.20 (104)	def.	Peel Thunder 10.10 (70)	Claremont Oval (crowd: 1201)
	Bye; Swan Districts

=== Round 12 ===
	Round 12
Saturday, 22 June (2:15 pm)	East Perth 22.13 (145)	def.	Swan Districts 7.10 (52)	Leederville Oval (crowd: 2569)
Saturday, 22 June (2:15 pm)	South Fremantle 15.17 (107)	def.	Claremont 8.15 (63)	Fremantle Oval (crowd: 1214)
Saturday, 22 June (2:15 pm)	Subiaco 11.14 (80)	def. by	East Fremantle 15.11 (101)	Subiaco Oval (crowd: 1355)
Saturday, 22 June (2:15 pm)	West Perth 5.12 (42)	def. by	Perth 16.9 (105)	Arena Joondalup (crowd: 1784)
	Bye; Peel Thunder

=== Round 13 ===
	Round 13
Saturday, 29 June (2:15 pm)	South Fremantle 15.16 (106)	def.	Peel Thunder 9.11 (65)	Fremantle Oval (crowd: 1033)
Saturday, 29 June (2:15 pm)	Swan Districts 9.7 (61)	def. by	East Fremantle 17.10 (112)	Bassendean Oval (crowd: 1843)
Saturday, 29 June (2:15 pm)	Claremont 8.7 (55)	def. by	West Perth 16.8 (104)	Newdegate (crowd: 2013)
Saturday, 29 June (2:15 pm)	Subiaco 16.10 (106)	def.	Perth 13.6 (84)	Subiaco Oval (crowd: 1355)
	Bye; East Perth
Swans hit the front late in the third quarter, but waste opportunities before East Fremantle kick 8.5 (53) to nothing in the last.

=== Round 14 ===
	Round 14
Saturday, 6 July (2:15 pm)	East Fremantle 11.18 (84)	def.	East Perth 10.5 (65)	East Fremantle Oval (crowd: 1606)
Saturday, 6 July (2:15 pm)	Peel Thunder 10.6 (66)	def.	West Perth 7.8 (50)	Rushton Park (crowd: 1094)
Saturday, 6 July (2:15 pm)	Perth 14.14 (98)	def.	Swan Districts 11.7 (73)	Lathlain Park (crowd: 1871)
Saturday, 6 July (2:15 pm)	Claremont 14.14 (98)	def.	Subiaco 7.6 (48)	Claremont Oval (crowd: 1263)
	Bye; South Fremantle
Peel beat West Perth for the first time, so that the Thunder had now beaten all their eight rivals at least once.; The Falcons’ score was the lowest against Peel to that point, beating 7.15 (57) by Swan Districts in 2001.

=== Round 15 ===
	Round 15
Saturday, 13 July (2:15 pm)	East Perth 15.14 (104)	def.	Perth 7.8 (50)	Leederville Oval (crowd: 2001)
Saturday, 13 July (2:15 pm)	West Perth 18.15 (123)	def.	South Fremantle 14.9 (93)	Arena Joondalup (crowd: 1257)
Saturday, 13 July (2:15 pm)	Subiaco 17.24 (126)	def.	Peel Thunder 1.10 (16)	Subiaco Oval (crowd: 1117)
Saturday, 13 July (2:15 pm)	Claremont 9.12 (66)	def.	Swan Districts 9.9 (63)	Newman (crowd: 2500)
	Bye; East Fremantle
Peel went within two minutes of becoming the first senior WAFL team to score no goals in a match since West Perth did so against soon-defunct Midland Junction in the opening round of 1916. Brandon Hill kicked the Thunder’s only goal from a long shot 23 minutes into the last quarter.

=== Round 16 ===
	Round 16
Saturday, 20 July (2:15 pm)	Claremont 13.7 (85)	def. by	East Perth 18.10 (118)	Claremont Oval (crowd: 1689)
Saturday, 20 July (2:15 pm)	Perth 11.18 (84)	def. by	East Fremantle 18.5 (113)	Lathlain Park (crowd: 1561)
Saturday, 20 July (2:15 pm)	Peel Thunder 20.7 (127)	def.	Swan Districts 12.7 (79)	Rushton Park (crowd: 1097)
Sunday, 21 July (2:15 pm)	South Fremantle 14.15 (99)	def.	Subiaco 11.7 (73)	Fremantle Oval (crowd: 1515)
	Bye; West Perth
Big Shark ruckmen Aaron Sandilands and Simon Eastaugh give East Fremantle a win that essentially ends Perth’s finals hopes, despite a second-half fadeout that sees them kick only 4.2 (26) to 10.11 (71).

=== Round 17 ===
	Round 17
Saturday, 27 July (2:15 pm)	East Fremantle 11.19 (85)	def.	Claremont 5.10 (40)	East Fremantle Oval (crowd: 1363)
Sunday, 28 July (2:15 pm)	Subiaco 11.9 (75)	def.	West Perth 8.9 (57)	Subiaco Oval (crowd: 1721)
Sunday, 28 July (2:15 pm)	East Perth 11.8 (74)	def. by	Peel Thunder 16.9 (105)	Leederville Oval (crowd: 1769)
Sunday, 28 July (2:15 pm)	Swan Districts 11.14 (80)	def. by	South Fremantle 11.16 (82)	Bassendean Oval (crowd: 1342)
	Bye; Perth
After an appalling first half in fine weather, East Fremantle kick 5.5 (35) to 2.3 (15) into the breeze to move to second and end a second team’s finals hopes.

=== Round 18 ===
	Round 18
Saturday, 3 August (2:15 pm)	Claremont 5.7 (37)	def. by	Perth 5.9 (39)	Claremont Oval (crowd: 1029)
Saturday, 3 August (2:15 pm)	Peel Thunder 13.17 (95)	def.	East Fremantle 13.13 (91)	Rushton Park (crowd: 1087)
Sunday, 4 August (2:15 pm)	South Fremantle 7.7 (49)	def. by	East Perth 10.18 (78)	Fremantle Oval (crowd: 1113)
Sunday, 4 August (2:15 pm)	West Perth 15.4 (94)	def.	Swan Districts 8.15 (63)	Arena Joondalup (crowd: 1044)
	Bye; Subiaco
Claremont record the third lowest aggregate score in their history and the lowest since 1966.

=== Round 19 ===
	Round 19
Saturday, 10 August (2:15 pm)	East Fremantle 10.13 (73)	def. by	South Fremantle 13.11 (89)	East Fremantle Oval (crowd: 1723)
Saturday, 10 August (2:15 pm)	Perth 11.12 (78)	def.	Peel Thunder 8.15 (63)	Lathlain Park (crowd: 1544)
Saturday, 10 August (2:15 pm)	Swan Districts 7.5 (47)	def. by	Subiaco 10.10 (70)	Bassendean Oval (crowd: 1430)
	Bye; Claremont, East Perth, West Perth

=== Round 20 ===
	Round 20
Saturday, 17 August (2:15 pm)	West Perth 16.10 (106)	def.	East Fremantle 10.7 (67)	Arena Joondalup (crowd: 1811)
Saturday, 17 August (2:15 pm)	Peel Thunder 13.8 (86)	def.	Claremont 7.12 (54)	Rushton Park (crowd: 1273)
Sunday, 18 August (2:15 pm)	Subiaco 17.12 (114)	def.	East Perth 11.8 (74)	Subiaco Oval (crowd: 2139)
Sunday, 18 August (2:15 pm)	South Fremantle 11.14 (80)	def. by	Perth 14.14 (98)	Fremantle Oval (crowd: 1346)
	Bye; Swan Districts

=== Round 21 ===
	Round 21
Saturday, 24 August (2:15 pm)	East Fremantle 9.10 (64)	def. by	Subiaco 15.13 (103)	East Fremantle Oval (crowd: 1695)
Saturday, 24 August (2:15 pm)	Perth 17.9 (111)	def. by	West Perth 18.11 (119)	Lathlain Park (crowd: 1780)
Saturday, 24 August (2:15 pm)	Claremont 13.10 (88)	def. by	South Fremantle 14.7 (91)	Claremont Oval (crowd: 1234)
Saturday, 24 August (2:15 pm)	East Perth 18.17 (125)	def.	Swan Districts 4.12 (36)	Leederville Oval (crowd: 2161)
	Bye; Peel Thunder
A burst of six goals in eight minutes during the last quarter wins West Perth the match and prepares them for the finals.; Bulldog veteran Marty Atkins produces an astonishing left foot torpedo punt goal as the Bulldogs led by 44 points before a remarkable Tiger comeback sees them 11 points ahead into time-on, before two Bulldog goals win.

== Ladder ==
2002 WAFL ladder
Pos	Team	Pld	W	L	D	PF	PA	PP	Pts
1	East Perth (P)	18	13	5	0	1773	1312	135.1	52
2	Subiaco	18	13	5	0	1529	1241	123.2	52
3	West Perth	18	12	6	0	1517	1460	103.9	48
4	East Fremantle	18	10	8	0	1504	1340	112.2	40
5	Perth	18	9	9	0	1446	1433	100.9	36
6	South Fremantle	18	9	9	0	1462	1466	99.7	36
7	Claremont	18	7	11	0	1299	1386	93.7	28
8	Peel Thunder	18	7	11	0	1446	1653	87.5	28
9	Swan Districts	18	1	17	0	1114	1799	61.9	4

Source: "2002 Ladder". WAFL Footy Facts.
Rules for classification: 1) points; 2) percentage; 3) number of points for.
(P) Premiers

== Finals ==
=== First semi-final ===
	First semi-final
Saturday, 31 August (2:15 pm)	West Perth 12.15 (87)	def.	East Fremantle 12.10 (82)	Subiaco Oval (crowd: 3,391)
Two goals each to Todd Curley and Corey Johnson snatch the game after the Falcons were nineteen points down entering time-on in the last quarter.

=== Second semi-final ===
	Second semi-final
Sunday, 8 September (2:15 pm)	East Perth 17.8 (110)	def.	Subiaco 10.10 (70)	Subiaco Oval (crowd: 6,431)

=== Preliminary final ===
	Preliminary final
Sunday, 15 September (2:15 pm)	Subiaco 10.9 (69)	def. by	West Perth 12.15 (87)	Subiaco Oval (crowd: 6,378)
The switch of Adam Curley into attack proved decisive for the Falcons who overpowered Subiaco in the last quarter.

=== Grand Final ===
2002 WAFL Grand Final
Sunday, 22 September	East Perth	def.	West Perth	Subiaco Oval (crowd: 31,382)
6.4 (40); 8.8 (56); 13.11 (89); 15.14 (104)	Q1; Q2; Q3; Final	1.2 (8); 1.6 (12); 2.11 (23); 5.14 (44)	Umpires: Luke Farmer, Craig Hendrie, Ryan Worthington; Simpson Medal: Ryan Turnbull (East Perth)
Ridley 3, Laich 3, Swan 2, Wheatley, Glancy, Thompson, Symmons, Baxter, Cowell, Humm	Goals	Duckworth 2, Leithhead, Britten, Todd Curley
Marley, Holman, Turnbull, Lalich, Humm, Prior	Best	Lassock, Todd Curley, Cousins, Leithhead, Duckworth, Lecras
Tony Micale wins his fourth premiership in five years (he won with East Fremantle in 1998) as West Perth are strangled completely up forward before rain affects the second half and the Royals coast.
