= 2013 WAFL season =

Australian rules football season

- Teams: 9
- Premiers: West Perth; 19th premiership
- Minor premiers: Claremont; 16th minor premiership
- Sandover Medallist: Rory O'Brien; East Fremantle (55 votes)
- Bernie Naylor Medallist: Josh Smith; East Perth (62 goals)

Attendance
- Matches played: 94
- Total attendance: 212,171 (2,257 per match)

The 2013 WAFL season was the 129th season of the various incarnations of the West Australian Football League (WAFL). It saw long-time rivals West Perth and East Perth both play in their first Grand Final for more than a decade after a long series of finals failures in between. Claremont for the second time won four consecutive minor premierships but failed in both their finals.

== Preseason ==
	Round 1
Sat. 23 February 10:30 AM	Claremont 16.6 (102)	def.	Swan Districts 12.8 (80)	Claremont Oval
Sat. 23 February 6:30 PM	Peel Thunder	v	East Fremantle	Bendigo Bank Stadium
Sat. 23 February 2:10 PM	Perth	v	South Fremantle	Brownes Stadium
Sat. 23 February 6:30 PM	Subiaco	v	East Perth	Medibank Stadium

	Round 2
Sat, 2 March 2:10 PM	East Fremantle 10.8 (68)	def. by	Subiaco 13.8 (86)	East Fremantle Oval
Sat, 2 March 6:30 PM	East Perth 13.9 (87)	def. by	Claremont 15.14 (104)	Medibank Stadium
Sat, 2 March 6:30 PM	South Fremantle 8.9 (57)	def. by	West Perth 17.11 (113)	Fremantle Oval
Sat, 2 March 10:30 AM	Swan Districts 15.11 (101)	def.	Perth 6.16 (52)	Steel Blue Oval

	Round 3
Sat, 9 March 6:00 PM	Peel Thunder 13.7 (85)	def. by	West Perth 14.10 (94)	Bendigo Bank Stadium
Sat, 9 March 2:10 PM	Perth 11.7 (73)	def. by	East Fremantle 17.8 (110)	Brownes Stadium
Sat, 9 March 2:10 PM	South Fremantle 18.8 (116)	def.	Swan Districts 11.9 (75)	Fremantle Oval
Sat, 9 March 6:30 PM	Subiaco 14.4 (88)	def. by	Claremont 15.5 (95)	Medibank Stadium

== Home and away season ==
=== Round 1 ===
	Round 1
Sat, 16 March 2:10 PM	West Perth 19.18 (132)	def.	East Perth 9.3 (57)	Arena Joondalup (crowd: 2574)
Sat, 16 March 2:10 PM	Perth 12.10 (82)	def.	Peel Thunder 9.16 (70)	Brownes Stadium (crowd: 1841)
Sat, 16 March 2:10 PM	Claremont 20.12 (132)	def.	South Fremantle 12.12 (84)	Claremont Oval (crowd: 1703)
Sat, 16 March 2:10 PM	East Fremantle 12.10 (82)	def. by	Swan Districts 13.15 (93)	East Fremantle Oval (crowd: 2218)
	Bye; Subiaco

=== Round 2 ===
	Round 2
Fri, 22 March 6:45 PM	Subiaco 8.6 (54)	def. by	West Perth 11.12 (78)	Medibank Stadium (crowd: 2035)
Sat, 23 March 2:10 PM	East Perth 11.14 (80)	def.	Peel Thunder 9.14 (68)	Medibank Stadium (crowd: 1689)
	Bye; Claremont, East Fremantle, Perth, South Fremantle, Swan Districts

=== Round 3 ===
	Round 3 – Easter weekend
Fri, 29 March 2:10 PM	Peel Thunder 13.10 (88)	def. by	East Fremantle 17.9 (111)	Bendigo Bank Stadium (crowd: 2653)
Fri, 29 March 4:10 PM	Subiaco 16.8 (104)	def.	East Perth 13.11 (89)	Medibank Stadium (crowd: 3406)
Sat, 30 March 2:10 PM	Perth 16.9 (105)	def.	South Fremantle 14.8 (92)	Brownes Stadium (crowd: 2278)
Sat, 30 March 2:10 PM	Swan Districts 9.10 (64)	def. by	Claremont 18.17 (125)	Steel Blue Oval (crowd: 2372)
	Bye; West Perth

=== Round 4 ===
	Round 4
Fri, 5 April 6:45 PM	South Fremantle 13.5 (83)	def. by	West Perth 13.8 (86)	Fremantle Oval (crowd: 1960)
Sat, 6 April 2:10 PM	East Fremantle 25.11 (161)	def.	Subiaco 14.8 (92)	East Fremantle Oval (crowd: 2079)
Sat, 6 April 2:10 PM	East Perth 11.9 (75)	def. by	Claremont 19.15 (129)	Medibank Stadium (crowd: 1847)
Sat, 6 April 2:10 PM	Swan Districts 14.17 (101)	def. by	Perth 15.13 (103)	Steel Blue Oval (crowd: 1596)
	Bye; Peel Thunder

=== Round 5 ===
	Round 5
Fri, 12 April 6:45 PM	Subiaco 4.9 (33)	def. by	Claremont 13.9 (87)	Medibank Stadium (crowd: 1483)
Sat, 13 April 2:10 PM	West Perth 17.13 (115)	def.	Peel Thunder 8.9 (57)	Arena Joondalup (crowd: 1591)
Sat, 13 April 2:10 PM	Swan Districts 15.12 (102)	def.	South Fremantle 12.9 (81)	Steel Blue Oval (crowd: 1532)
Sun, 14 April 2:10 PM	Perth 16.10 (106)	def. by	East Fremantle 15.18 (108)	Brownes Stadium (crowd: 2319)
	Bye; East Perth

=== Round 6 ===
	Round 6
Sat, 20 April 12:30 PM	East Fremantle 12.14 (86)	def. by	East Perth 14.12 (96)	East Fremantle Oval (crowd: 1598)
Sat, 20 April 2:10 PM	Claremont 13.9 (87)	def.	West Perth 10.8 (68)	Claremont Oval (crowd: 1529)
Sat, 20 April 2:10 PM	South Fremantle 10.12 (72)	def. by	Subiaco 16.17 (113)	Fremantle Oval (crowd: 989)
Sun, 21 April 2:10 PM	Peel Thunder 15.8 (98)	def.	Swan Districts 12.12 (84)	Bendigo Bank Stadium (crowd: 1392)
	Bye; Perth

=== Round 7 ===
	Round 7 – Anzac Day Weekend
Thu, 25 April 2:10 PM	Perth 19.16 (130)	def.	East Perth 11.13 (79)	Brownes Stadium (crowd: 3307)
Thu, 25 April 3:15 PM	West Perth 9.16 (70)	def. by	Swan Districts 15.8 (98)	Arena Joondalup (crowd: 2695)
Thu, 25 April 4:15 PM	South Fremantle 7.12 (54)	def. by	East Fremantle 12.11 (83)	Fremantle Oval (crowd: 3985)
Sat, 27 April 2:10 PM	Peel Thunder 11.12 (78)	def. by	Claremont 14.11 (95)	Bendigo Bank Stadium (crowd: 1469)
	Bye; Subiaco

=== Round 8 ===
	Round 8
Sat, 4 May 2:10 PM	Peel Thunder 12.18 (90)	def.	Subiaco 12.9 (81)	Bendigo Bank Stadium (crowd: 1261)
Sat, 4 May 2:10 PM	Claremont 15.10 (100)	def.	Perth 14.11 (95)	Claremont Oval (crowd: 1955)
Sat, 4 May 2:10 PM	East Fremantle 21.3 (129)	def. by	West Perth 24.8 (152)	East Fremantle Oval (crowd: 1811)
Sat, 4 May 2:10 PM	East Perth 18.13 (121)	def.	South Fremantle 14.18 (102)	Medibank Stadium (crowd: 1896)
	Bye; Swan Districts

=== State game ===
Western Australia vs Victoria
11 May 2013	Western Australia	def.	Victoria	Henry Street Oval, Northam, Western Australia (crowd: 1500)
2.7; 7.11; 12.13; 17.16	Q1; Q2; Q3; Final	6.5; 12.6; 15.9; 15.11	Umpires: Stuart Parry, Justin Orr, Andrew Talbot; Best player: Simpson Medal – Wayde Twomey (WA); Frank Johnson Medal – Chris Cain (Vic); Television broadcast: ABC1
5 Twomey, 3 Bevan, Geappen, 2 Stack, Black, 1 van Berlo, C.Wheeler	Goals	4 Lloyd, 3 Scipione, 2 Michalides, Lourey, Warren, 1 Panozza, Lambert
Twomey, Dodd, O'Brien, Johnson, Wheeler, Motlop	Best	Cain, Sewell, Panozza, Marigliani, Lambert, Lloyd

=== Round 9 ===
	Round 9
Sat, 18 May 2:10 PM	Claremont 16.15 (111)	def.	East Fremantle 9.15 (69)	Claremont Oval (crowd: 2677)
Sat, 18 May 2:10 PM	South Fremantle 14.15 (99)	def.	Peel Thunder 11.18 (84)	Fremantle Oval (crowd: 1098)
Sat, 18 May 2:10 PM	Subiaco 13.12 (90)	def. by	Perth 18.7 (115)	Medibank Stadium (crowd: 2359)
Sat, 18 May 2:10 PM	Swan Districts 11.17 (83)	def. by	East Perth 15.13 (103)	Steel Blue Oval (crowd: 2267)
	Bye; West Perth

=== Round 10 ===
	Round 10
Sat, 25 May 2:10 PM	West Perth 17.13 (115)	def.	Perth 12.7 (79)	Arena Joondalup (crowd: 2189)
Sat, 25 May 2:10 PM	Peel Thunder 13.13 (91)	def.	East Perth 10.13 (73)	Bendigo Bank Stadium (crowd: 1472)
Sat, 25 May 2:10 PM	South Fremantle 9.11 (65)	def. by	Claremont 20.12 (132)	Fremantle Oval (crowd: 1565)
Sat, 25 May 2:10 PM	Swan Districts 10.12 (72)	def. by	Subiaco 12.13 (85)	Steel Blue Oval (crowd: 2802)
	Bye; East Fremantle

=== Round 11 ===
	Round 11 – Western Australia Day Weekend
Sat, 1 June 2:10 PM	Perth 15.10 (100)	def. by	Swan Districts 16.8 (104)	Brownes Stadium (crowd: 2747)
Sun, 2 June 2:10 PM	Claremont 7.12 (54)	def. by	Subiaco 9.10 (64)	Claremont Oval (crowd: 1807)
Sun, 2 June 2:10 PM	East Fremantle 10.12 (72)	def. by	South Fremantle 21.13 (139)	East Fremantle Oval (crowd: 5120)
Mon, 3 June 2:10 PM	East Perth 17.12 (114)	def.	West Perth 14.11 (95)	Medibank Stadium (crowd: 4806)
	Bye; Peel Thunder
West Perth midfielder Matt Guadagnin played his 150th WAFL league match in the game between West Perth and East Perth.

=== Round 12 ===
	Round 12
Sat, 8 June 2:10 PM	West Perth 15.8 (98)	def. by	Claremont 18.11 (119)	Arena Joondalup (crowd: 1937)
Sat, 8 June 2:10 PM	East Fremantle 14.7 (91)	def.	Peel Thunder 8.8 (56)	East Fremantle Oval (crowd: 1408)
Sat, 8 June 2:10 PM	Subiaco 15.16 (106)	def.	South Fremantle 7.11 (53)	Medibank Stadium (crowd: 2178)
	Bye; Swan Districts, East Perth, Perth

=== Round 13 ===
	Round 13
Sat, 15 June 2:10 PM	Claremont 15.12 (102)	def.	Peel Thunder 7.7 (49)	Claremont Oval (crowd: 1254)
Sat, 15 June 2:10 PM	Subiaco 12.11 (83)	def. by	Swan Districts 20.10 (130)	Medibank Stadium (crowd: 2154)
Sun, 16 June 2:10 PM	Perth 12.11 (83)	def. by	East Perth 15.11 (101)	Brownes Stadium (crowd: 2277)
Sun, 16 June 2:10 PM	East Fremantle 10.9 (69)	def. by	West Perth 12.11 (83)	East Fremantle Oval (crowd: 2486)
	Bye; South Fremantle

=== Round 14 ===
	Round 14
Sat, 22 June 2:05 PM	West Perth 13.13 (91)	def.	Subiaco 13.12 (90)	Arena Joondalup (crowd: 2051)
Sat, 22 June 2:05 PM	Peel Thunder 9.13 (67)	def. by	Perth 18.9 (117)	Bendigo Bank Stadium (crowd: 1437)
Sat, 22 June 2:05 PM	South Fremantle 13.8 (86)	def. by	Swan Districts 20.18 (138)	Fremantle Oval (crowd: 1674)
Sat, 22 June 2:05 PM	East Perth 14.7 (91)	def.	East Fremantle 13.10 (88)	Medibank Stadium (crowd: 2307)
	Bye; Claremont

=== Round 15 ===
	Round 15
Sat, 29 June 1:45 PM	Claremont 15.8 (98)	def.	East Fremantle 13.17 (95)	Kununurra (crowd: 2300)
Sat, 29 June 2:05 PM	South Fremantle 16.7 (103)	def. by	Perth 16.17 (113)	Fremantle Oval (crowd: 1551)
Sat, 29 June 2:05 PM	East Perth 20.17 (137)	def.	Peel Thunder 7.4 (46)	Medibank Stadium (crowd: 1949)
Sat, 29 June 2:05 PM	Swan Districts 11.13 (79)	def. by	West Perth 11.16 (82)	Steel Blue Oval (crowd: 2717)
	Bye; Subiaco

=== Round 16 ===
	Round 16 – NAIDOC Week
Sat, 6 July 2:05 PM	Peel Thunder 13.7 (85)	def. by	West Perth 15.11 (101)	Bendigo Bank Stadium (crowd: 1597)
Sat, 6 July 2:05 PM	South Fremantle 14.6 (90)	def. by	Claremont 13.16 (94)	Fremantle Oval (crowd: 1308)
Sat, 6 July 2:05 PM	Subiaco 8.9 (57)	def. by	East Fremantle 17.21 (123)	Medibank Stadium (crowd: 1751)
Sat, 6 July 2:05 PM	Swan Districts 24.12 (156)	def.	Perth 10.7 (67)	Steel Blue Oval (crowd: 2065)
	Bye; East Perth

=== Round 17 ===
	Round 17
Sat, 13 July 2:05 PM	Perth 13.19 (97)	def.	Subiaco 9.17 (71)	Brownes Stadium (crowd: 1701)
Sat, 13 July 2:05 PM	Claremont 10.11 (71)	def. by	Swan Districts 16.14 (110)	Claremont Oval (crowd: 2299)
	Bye; East Fremantle, East Perth, Peel Thunder, South Fremantle, West Perth

=== Round 18 ===
	Round 18
Sat, 20 July 2:05 PM	West Perth 9.13 (67)	def. by	South Fremantle 15.16 (106)	Arena Joondalup (crowd: 1902)
Sat, 20 July 2:05 PM	Peel Thunder 7.7 (49)	def. by	Perth 18.15 (123)	Bendigo Bank Stadium (crowd: 1170)
Sat, 20 July 2:05 PM	East Fremantle 15.13 (103)	def.	Subiaco 10.9 (69)	East Fremantle Oval (crowd: 1686)
Sat, 20 July 2:05 PM	East Perth 14.11 (95)	def.	Swan Districts 12.11 (83)	Medibank Stadium (crowd: 3044)
	Bye; Claremont

=== Round 19 ===
	Round 19
Sat, 27 July 2:05 PM	West Perth 10.14 (74)	def.	East Perth 6.8 (44)	Arena Joondalup (crowd: 1422)
Sat, 27 July 2:05 PM	South Fremantle 8.7 (55)	def. by	East Fremantle 20.18 (138)	Fremantle Oval (crowd: 1332)
Sat, 27 July 2:05 PM	Subiaco 5.9 (39)	def. by	Claremont 7.16 (58)	Medibank Stadium (crowd: 1597)
Sat, 27 July 2:05 PM	Swan Districts 12.9 (81)	def.	Peel Thunder 10.10 (70)	Steel Blue Oval (crowd: 1279)
	Bye; Perth

=== Round 20 ===
	Round 20
Sat, 3 August 2:05 PM	West Perth 17.12 (114)	def.	Peel Thunder 9.11 (65)	Arena Joondalup (crowd: 1318)
Sat, 3 August 2:05 PM	Claremont 19.13 (127)	def.	East Perth 14.15 (99)	Claremont Oval (crowd: 1465)
Sat, 3 August 2:05 PM	East Fremantle 16.12 (108)	def.	Perth 12.8 (80)	East Fremantle Oval (crowd: 1777)
Sat, 3 August 2:05 PM	Subiaco 14.14 (98)	def. by	South Fremantle 16.10 (106)	Medibank Stadium (crowd: 1135)
	Bye; Swan Districts

=== Round 21 ===
	Round 21
Sat, 10 August 2:05 PM	Peel Thunder 14.10 (94)	def. by	Swan Districts 14.16 (100)	Bendigo Bank Stadium (crowd: 1522)
Sat, 10 August 2:05 PM	Perth 7.13 (55)	def. by	West Perth 18.7 (115)	Moora (crowd: 2515)
Sat, 10 August 2:05 PM	East Perth 20.12 (132)	def.	Subiaco 9.10 (64)	Medibank Stadium (crowd: 1776)
	Bye; Claremont, East Fremantle, South Fremantle

=== Round 22 ===
	Round 22
Sat, 17 August 2:05 PM	East Perth 20.16 (136)	def.	Perth 13.10 (88)	Medibank Stadium (crowd: 1915)
Sun, 18 August 2:05 PM	West Perth 9.7 (61)	def. by	East Fremantle 20.14 (134)	Arena Joondalup (crowd: 6195)
Sun, 18 August 2:05 PM	Peel Thunder 9.13 (67)	def. by	South Fremantle 24.16 (160)	Bendigo Bank Stadium (crowd: 1320)
Sun, 18 August 2:05 PM	Claremont 19.10 (124)	def.	Swan Districts 9.11 (65)	Claremont Oval (crowd: about 1915)
	Bye; Subiaco
The crowd of 6195 at Arena Joondalup was the largest of the season to Round 22. 30,000 free tickets were given to schoolchildren for West Perth's "International Round".

=== Round 23 ===
	Round 23
Sat, 24 August 2:05 PM	Perth 12.9 (81)	def. by	Claremont 14.12 (96)	Brownes Stadium (crowd: 1602)
Sat, 24 August 2:05 PM	South Fremantle 22.13 (145)	def.	East Perth 21.7 (133)	Fremantle Oval (crowd: 1401)
Sat, 24 August 2:05 PM	Subiaco 18.14 (122)	def.	Peel Thunder 12.5 (77)	Medibank Stadium (crowd: 1614)
Sat, 24 August 2:05 PM	Swan Districts 14.19 (103)	def.	East Fremantle 12.8 (80)	Steel Blue Oval (crowd: 1924)
	Bye; West Perth
Marlon Pickett made his debut for South Fremantle, receiving five Sandover Medal votes in a best-on-ground performance.

=== Round 24 ===
	Round 24
Sat, 31 August 2:05 PM	Perth 17.13 (115)	def.	South Fremantle 13.13 (91)	Brownes Stadium (crowd: 1431)
Sat, 31 August 2:05 PM	East Fremantle 13.9 (87)	def.	Claremont 11.11 (77)	East Fremantle Oval (crowd: 1509)
Sat, 31 August 2:05 PM	East Perth 11.16 (82)	def.	Subiaco 8.15 (63)	Medibank Stadium (crowd: 1530)
Sat, 31 August 2:05 PM	Swan Districts 10.13 (73)	def.	West Perth 7.13 (55)	Steel Blue Oval (crowd: 1852)
	Bye; Peel Thunder

== Ladder ==
2013 ladder
Pos	Team	Pld	W	L	D	PF	PA	PP	Pts
1	Claremont	20	17	3	0	2018	1508	133.8	68
2	West Perth (P)	20	13	7	0	1852	1677	110.4	52
3	Swan Districts	20	12	8	0	1919	1754	109.4	48
4	East Perth	20	12	8	0	1937	1881	103.0	48
5	East Fremantle	20	11	9	0	2017	1761	114.5	44
6	Perth	20	10	10	0	1934	1952	99.1	40
7	South Fremantle	20	6	14	0	1866	2099	88.9	24
8	Subiaco	20	6	14	0	1578	1870	84.4	24
9	Peel Thunder	20	3	17	0	1449	2068	70.1	12

Source: WAFL Footy Facts
Rules for classification: 1) points; 2) percentage; 3) number of points for.
(P) Premiers

== Finals ==
	1st semi-final
Sun, 8 September 2:15 PM	Swan Districts 15.4 (94)	def. by	East Perth 18.14 (122)	Steel Blue Oval (crowd: 5452)

	2nd semi-final
Sun, 8 September 2:15 PM	Claremont 12.11 (83)	def. by	West Perth 11.21 (87)	Claremont Oval (crowd: 2952)
West Perth defender Dan Hunt played his 150th WAFL league match in the 2nd semi-final.

	Preliminary final
Sun, 15 September 2:15 PM	Claremont 14.9 (93)	def. by	East Perth 24.12 (156)	Claremont Oval (crowd: 4153)
Claremont player David Crawford made his 200th WAFL league appearance in the Preliminary Final.

2013 WAFL Grand Final
22 September (2:15 pm)	West Perth	def.	East Perth	Patersons Stadium (crowd: 20,008)
4.2 (26); 10.3 (63); 13.7 (85); 20.11 (131)	Q1; Q2; Q3; Final	5.2 (32); 8.4 (52); 11.8 (74); 12.10 (82)	Umpires: Stuart Parry, Justin Orr, Scott McPhee; Simpson Medal: Mark Hutchings; Television broadcast: ABC1
5 R.Kerr; 3 M.Hutchings; 2 M.Crisp, N.Rodda, J.Mellington, M.Fowler; 1 J.Salecic, S.Nelson, K.Manning, S.Potente	Goals	3 J.Cripps, 2 S.Lycett, M.Seal, J.Smith; 1 C.Wulff, P.Johnson, M.Swan
M.Hutchings, R.Kerr, A.Strijk, S.Potente, D.Hunt	Best	A.Sweet, M.Swan, R.Maldenis, M.White
Kody Manning – rough conduct	Reports
