= Scott Simister =

Australian rules footballer (born 1973)

Personal information
- Full name: Scott James Simister
- Born: 24 February 1973 (age 53)
- Original team: Springvale (VFA)
- Draft: 69th, 1992 AFL draft
- Height: 185 cm (6 ft 1 in)
- Weight: 85 kg (187 lb)

Playing career^{1}
Years	Club	Games (Goals)
1993	Melbourne	3 (2)
1994–1996	West Adelaide	? (188)
1997–2003	Peel Thunder	76 (219)
2004	East Fremantle	25 (41)
- ^{1} Playing statistics correct to the end of 2004.

Scott Simister (born 24 February 1973) is a former Australian rules footballer who played with Melbourne in the Australian Football League (AFL).

Simister spent time in three states during his career, starting in Victoria. He was recruited by Melbourne from Victorian Football Association (VFA) club Springvale with the 69th pick of the 1992 AFL draft and debuted in the 1993 AFL season at the age of 20. A forward, he kicked a goal in Melbourne's wins over both Collingwood and Essendon at the MCG and then had 16 disposals in an away loss to Sydney.

After Simister left Melbourne at the end of the 1993 season, SANFL club West Adelaide secured his signature and he topped their goal-kicking in each of his three years.

In 1997 Simister joined new Westar Rules club Peel Thunder and despite beginning his career with the new club as a defender and being selected for the Westar Rules representative team in that role, was soon moved into attack and became the Thunder's chief forward in their formative years. Club captain in 1999, Simister was Peel's leading goal-kicker in 1997, 1998, 1999 and 2002, in the third of those kicking fifty-four goals for a club that did not win a single game. He also spent a season at East Fremantle in 2004.

He continued his footballing career out in the country in 2005, playing for Kambalda in the Goldfields Football League, where he was the competition's leading goal-kicker. Simister crossed to the Peel Football League's South Mandurah in 2006 and was "Best on Ground" in the Grand Final that season.
