= 2021 WAFL Women's season =

- Teams: 6
- Premiers: Peel Thunder; 2nd premiership
- Minor premiers: Swan Districts; 1st minor premiership
- Best and fairest: Ella Smith; Claremont (15 votes)
- Leading goalkicker: Kate Bartlett; Peel Thunder (38 goals)

The 2021 WAFL Women's season was the third season of the WAFL Women's (WAFLW). The season commenced on 20 February and concluded with the Grand Final on 11 July 2021. The competition was contested by six clubs, the same as the previous season.

== Clubs ==
- Claremont, East Fremantle, Peel Thunder, South Fremantle, Subiaco, Swan Districts

== Ladder ==
Pos	Team	Pld	W	L	D	PF	PA	PP	Pts	Qualification
1	Swan Districts	15	14	1	0	716	338	211.8	56	Finals series
2	Peel Thunder (P)	15	10	5	0	716	463	154.6	40	Finals series
3	Claremont	15	8	7	0	530	406	130.5	32	Finals series
4	Subiaco	15	8	7	0	516	497	103.8	32	Finals series
5	East Fremantle	15	5	10	0	493	635	77.6	20	
6	South Fremantle	15	0	15	0	238	870	27.4	0	

Source: WAFL.com.au
Rules for classification: 1) points; 2) percentage; 3) number of points for.
(P) Premiers

== Finals series ==
=== Semi-finals ===
	First Semi-Final
Sunday 20 June (1:30 pm)	Claremont 2.3 (15)	def. by	Subiaco 2.6 (18)	Claremont Oval	Report

	Second Semi-Final
Sunday 20 June (2:30 pm)	Swan Districts 0.11 (11)	def. by	Peel Thunder 2.4 (16)	Bassendean Oval	Report

=== Preliminary final ===
	Preliminary Final
Sunday 27 June (2:30 pm)	Swan Districts 7.8 (50)	def.	Subiaco 1.6 (12)	Bassendean Oval	Report

=== Grand Final ===
2021 WAFLW Grand Final
11 July 2021 (3:15 pm)	Peel Thunder	def.	Swan Districts	Rushton Park	Report
2.0 (12); 2.4 (16); 3.4 (22); 5.3 (33)	Q1; Q2; Q3; Final	0.1 (1); 1.1 (7); 2.3 (15); 2.3 (15)	Lou Knitter Medal (Best on ground): Sabreena Duffy (Peel Thunder); Television broadcast: Seven Network
K. Phillips 3, K Bartlett 2	Goals	B. Webb, M Hyde
S. Duffy, K. Phillips, K. Bartlett, E. Roberts, C. Davidson, S. Verrier	Best	M Hyde, T. Stribley, E. Gelmi, S. Cain, E. McGuire
Match was originally scheduled for 4 July 2021, but was postponed due to the COVID-19 pandemic in Western Australia causing a 4-day lockdown in Perth from June 28.; Peel Thunder win back-to-back WAFL Women's premierships.

== Awards ==
Claremont captain Ella Smith claimed the 2021 Dhara Kerr Award after finishing with 15 votes tied with Subiaco’s Abbey Dowrick, who was deemed ineligible to win the award after being suspended in Round 15.

- Dhara Kerr Award

Ella Smith (Claremont)

- WAFLW Joanne Huggins Leading Goal Kicker Award

Kate Bartlett (Peel Thunder)

- WAFLW Cath Boyce Rookie of the Year Award

Kloe Taylor (Swan Districts)

- Coach of the Year

Adam Dancey (Swan Districts)

- Rogers Cup Fairest and Best

Noa McNaughton (South Fremantle)

- Rogers Cup Leading Goal Kicker

Elissa Price (West Perth)

- Rogers Cup Rising Star

Noa McNaughton (South Fremantle)

- Reserves Premiers

Peel Thunder

- Reserves Fairest and Best

Nikki Phillips (East Fremantle) & Jacinta Anderson (Swan Districts)

- Reserves Leading Goal Kicker

Chloe Sauzier (Claremont)
