= 2020 WAFL Women's season =

West Australian Football League season

- Teams: 6
- Premiers: Peel Thunder; 1st premiership
- Minor premiers: Subiaco; 2nd minor premiership
- Best and fairest: Danika Pisconeri; Subiaco (9 votes)
- Leading goalkicker: Kira Phillips; Peel Thunder (17 goals)

The 2020 WAFL Women's season was the second season of the WAFL Women's (WAFLW). The season commenced on 18 July and concluded with the Grand Final on 19 September 2020. The competition was contested by six clubs, one more than the previous season with the addition of South Fremantle, all of whom were affiliated with men's clubs from the West Australian Football League (WAFL). The commencement of the season was delayed several months due to the impact of the COVID-19 pandemic.

== Clubs ==
- Claremont, East Fremantle, Peel Thunder, South Fremantle, Subiaco, Swan Districts

== Ladder ==
Pos	Team	Pld	W	L	D	PF	PA	PP	Pts	Qualification
1	Subiaco	7	6	1	0	304	158	192.4	24	Finals series
2	Peel Thunder (P)	7	4	3	0	283	211	134.1	16	Finals series
3	East Fremantle	7	4	3	0	215	161	133.5	16	Finals series
4	Swan Districts	7	4	3	0	270	254	106.3	16	Finals series
5	Claremont	7	3	4	0	279	165	169.1	12	
6	South Fremantle	7	0	7	0	78	480	16.3	0	

Source: Australian Football
Rules for classification: 1) points; 2) percentage; 3) number of points for.
(P) Premiers

== Finals series ==
=== Qualifying and Elimination finals ===
	Elimination Final
Sunday 6 September (2:30 pm)	East Fremantle 5.5 (35)	def.	Swan Districts 4.5 (29)	New Choice Homes Park	Report

	Qualifying Final
Sunday 6 September (2:30 pm)	Subiaco 4.4 (28)	def.	Peel Thunder 3.4 (22)	Leederville Oval	Report

=== Preliminary final ===
	Preliminary Final
Sunday 13 September (2:30 pm)	Peel Thunder 9.1 (55)	def.	East Fremantle 5.8 (38)	David Grays Arena	Report

=== Grand Final ===
2020 WAFLW Grand Final
Saturday 19 September (2:40 pm)	Subiaco	def. by	Peel Thunder	Provident Financial Oval
1.0 (6); 1.1 (7); 2.1 (13); 2.1 (13)	Q1; Q2; Q3; Final	1.1 (7); 4.1 (25); 4.3 (27); 4.4 (28)	Best on ground: Chloe Wrigle (Peel Thunder); Television broadcast: Seven Network
M Maclachlan	Goals	E Roberts 2 B Molloy, K Phillips 1
M Maclachlan	Best	G Mckinley, E Dowson, C Wrigley, D Liddle, E Roberts
Peel Thunder won the first senior women's premiership.
