= 2015 WAFL season =

Australian rules football season

- Teams: 9
- Premiers: Subiaco; 13th premiership
- Minor premiers: Subiaco; 13th minor premiership
- Sandover Medallist: Aidan Tropiano; Perth (45 votes)
- Bernie Naylor Medallist: Shane Yarran; Subiaco (46 goals)
- Highest: 13,094 (Grand Final, Subiaco vs. West Perth)

The 2015 WAFL season was the 131st season of the various incarnations of the West Australian Football League (WAFL). The season began on 20 March 2015 and concluded on 27 September 2015 with the 2015 WAFL Grand Final between Subiaco and West Perth at Domain Stadium. Subiaco won the match by 66 points, recording their second consecutive premiership and 13th overall.

For the first time since 1994, the finals series was based on a top-5, rather than the top 4 system that has been used since 1931, with the exception of 1991–1994.

== Clubs ==
Club	Home ground	Location	2014 season
Claremont	Claremont Showground	Claremont	11-9 (DNQ Finals)
East Fremantle	East Fremantle Oval	East Fremantle	12-8 (Preliminary final)
East Perth	Leederville Oval	Leederville	16-4 (Runners up)
Peel Thunder	Rushton Park	Mandurah	4-16 (DNQ Finals)
Perth	Lathlain Park	Lathlain	3-17 (DNQ Finals)
South Fremantle	Fremantle Oval	Fremantle	9-11 (DNQ Finals)
Subiaco	Leederville Oval	Leederville	14-6 (Premiers)
Swan Districts	Bassendean Oval	Bassendean	12-8 (semi-final)
West Perth	Arena Joondalup	Joondalup	9-11 (DNQ Finals)

== Ladder ==
2015 ladder
Pos	Team	Pld	W	L	D	PF	PA	PP	Pts
1	Subiaco (P)	20	17	3	0	1899	1102	172.3	68
2	West Perth	20	13	7	0	1688	1448	116.6	52
3	Peel Thunder	20	13	7	0	1734	1632	106.3	52
4	East Perth	20	11	9	0	1697	1480	114.7	44
5	Claremont	20	10	10	0	1531	1433	106.8	40
6	Swan Districts	20	10	10	0	1627	1571	103.6	40
7	South Fremantle	20	8	12	0	1458	1763	82.7	32
8	East Fremantle	20	6	14	0	1452	1788	81.2	24
9	Perth	20	2	18	0	1269	2138	59.4	8

Source: WAFL Footy Facts
Rules for classification: 1) points; 2) percentage; 3) number of points for.
(P) Premiers

== Finals series ==
=== Elimination and Qualifying Finals ===
	Elimination Final
Sunday 6 September (2:10 pm)	East Perth 13.15 (93)	def.	Claremont 9.7 (61)	Medibank Stadium (crowd: 2,670)	Report

	Qualifying Final
Sunday 6 September (2:15 pm)	West Perth 22.13 (145)	def.	Peel Thunder 5.6 (36)	HBF Arena (crowd: 2500 (approx))	Report
Peel Thunder's first ever finals game after 19 seasons.

=== Semi-finals ===
	First semi-final
Sunday 13 September (2:15 pm)	Peel Thunder 9.8 (62)	def. by	East Perth 10.24 (84)	Bendigo Bank Stadium (crowd: 2500 (approx))	Report
Skipper Brendan Lee leads the Royals into the Preliminary Final with 35 disposals

	Second semi-final
Sunday 13 September (2:15 pm)	Subiaco 17.13 (115)	def.	West Perth 9.6 (60)	Medibank Stadium (crowd: 2500 (approx))	Report

=== Preliminary final ===
	Preliminary final
Sunday 20 September (2:10 pm)	West Perth 14.13 (97)	def.	East Perth 10.8 (68)	HBF Arena (crowd: 2800)	Report
The Falcons storm home to beat their arch-rivals on the back of 6 goals to Michael Lourey

=== Grand Final ===
2015 WAFL Grand Final
Sunday 27 September (2:15 pm)	Subiaco	def.	West Perth	Domain Stadium (crowd: 13,094)	Report
3.4 (22); 10.7 (67); 17.8 (110); 21.10 (136)	Q1; Q2; Q3; Final	3.3 (21); 5.4 (34); 7.9 (51); 10.10 (70)	Umpires: Scott McPhee, Stuart Parry, Matthew Adams; Simpson Medal: Matt Boland (Subiaco); Television broadcast: Seven Network
7: Boland; 5: Yarran; 2: Halligan; 1: Wheeler, Menegola, Deluca, Mahoney, Wood, Twomey, Phelan	Goals	2: Strijk, Rasmussen; 1: Lourey, Rohde, Lynch, Adams, Black, Potente
Menegola, Yarran, Wheeler, Twomey, Boland, Phelan, Kitchin, Rumble, Lowndes	Best	Strijk, Nelson, Manzone, van Berlo, Keunen, Kerr
