= Darren Bolton =

Australian rules footballer

Personal information
- Born: 26 November 1976 (age 49); Perth, Western Australia
- Original team: Peel Thunder (WAFL)
- Debut: Round 3, 10 April 1999, Fremantle vs. Richmond, at Subiaco Oval

Playing career^{1}
Years	Club	Games (Goals)
1999	Fremantle	2 (0)
- ^{1} Playing statistics correct to the end of 1999.

Darren Bolton (born 26 November 1976) is an Australian rules footballer. He played as a rover.

Bolton was selected by Fremantle in the 1999 AFL Rookie Draft from the Peel Thunder Football Club after winning the 1998 Best and Fairest award at Peel. In 1999 he played two Games in rounds 3 and 4. He was delisted by Fremantle at the end of the season.

From 1997 until 2004 Bolton played for Peel Thunder in the WAFL as a midfielder. In 2005 he played for Waroona in the Peel League. He returned to Peel Thunder for the 2006 and 2007 seasons.

He is the father of Fremantle forward Shai Bolton.
