= Brock O'Brien =

Australian rules footballer

Personal information
- Born: 30 May 1988 (age 38)
- Original team: Peel Thunder (WAFL)
- Debut: Rd 22, 1 September 2007, Fremantle vs. Port Adelaide, at AAMI Stadium

Playing career^{1}
Years	Club	Games (Goals)
2007–2010	Fremantle	3 (1)
- ^{1} Playing statistics correct to the end of 2010.

Brock O'Brien (born 30 May 1988) is an Australian rules footballer in the Australian Football League. He plays as a midfielder or defender and was selected by the Fremantle Football Club with selection 52 in the 2006 AFL National Draft.

O'Brien made his senior debut for Peel Thunder in the West Australian Football League in 2005 as a 16-year-old alongside his older brother, Rory O'Brien. He represented Western Australia in the national under 16 championships in 2004 and the national under 18 championships in both 2005 and 2006. He is also a graduate of the AIS/AFL academy and was a member of the national under 17 team which played against Ireland when they toured in 2006.

He made his AFL debut in the final round of the 2007 season, when Fremantle suspended six players for off-field indiscretions, including mid-week drinking of alcohol and a missing training session. His debut was described as magnificent, with his 16 possessions being a shining light in an otherwise disappointing end to a year in which Fremantle started as one of the premiership favourites, but did not even make the final eight.

However he only played two more games in 2008, and none in 2009 and 2010, mainly due to injuries, before he was delisted at the end of the 2010 season. Following his delisting, he attempted to transfer from Peel to East Fremantle, but his request was blocked by the WAFL.
