= Kristin Thornton =

Australian rules footballer (born 1988)

Personal information
- Full name: Kristin Thornton
- Born: 5 March 1988 (age 38)
- Original team: Harvey Brunswick Leschenault (SWFL)
- Draft: 54th overall, 2005 National draft, Sydney; 90th overall, 2009 National draft, Sydney
- Height: 185 cm (6 ft 1 in)
- Weight: 81 kg (179 lb)
- Position: Forward/Midfield

Playing career^{1}
Years	Club	Games (Goals)
2005-2010	Sydney	8 (4)
2011-2014	Peel Thunder	71 (88)
Total		79 (92)
- ^{1} Playing statistics correct to the end of 2019.

Career highlights
- Peel Thunder best and fairest 2011

Kristin Thornton (born 5 March 1988) is an Australian rules footballer who played for Sydney in the Australian Football League.

Thornton is from Australind, Western Australia. In 2005 he played for Peel Thunder in the WAFL Colts, where he won the 2005 WAFL Colts premiership. As a 17 year old, Thornton won the Dave Cameron Medal as Peel Thunder's Colts best and fairest, despite missing 4 games to WA State U/18's commitments. He also was named in the 2005 WAFL Colts Team of the Year. Thornton attended the 2005 AFL Draft Camp held at the Australian Institute of Sport (AIS), Canberra.

He was recruited by the Sydney Swans with pick number 54 in the 2005 AFL draft from Peel Thunder. Thornton captained a very strong Sydney Swans Reserves to the 2007 AFL Canberra premiership. He missed the entirety of the 2008 season after suffering an ACL injury, the same injury which destroyed his brother Ashley's AFL career while at the West Coast Eagles. He was delisted at the season's end, before being redrafted by Sydney as a rookie with pick 90 in the 2009 national draft. Thornton made his AFL debut for the Sydney Swans in round 8, 2009 against the Carlton Blues, kicking a goal with his first kick.

He starred for Peel Thunder in the 2011 WAFL season and was awarded with a WA State Team selection, kicking 2 goals in a defeat of Queensland. Thornton made the 2011 WAFL Team of the Year and capped off a brilliant season when he won the Dudley Tuckey Medal as Peel Thunder's best and fairest. He was Vice Captain from 2011-2014 and was selected in Peel Thunder's All Star Team - Best 25 players in the first 25 years. Thornton finished playing for Peel Thunder at the completion of the 2014 season.

In 2016 Thornton then returned to Harvey Brunswick Leschenault in the South West Football League (SWFL), where he won the 2016 best and fairest, and a premiership in an undefeated side in 2019.
