= Gerald Ugle =

Australian rules footballer

Personal information
- Born: 31 January 1993 (age 33)
- Original team: Beverley Football Club
- Debut: Round 17, 2012, Greater Western Sydney vs. Fremantle, at Subiaco Oval
- Height: 180 cm (5 ft 11 in)
- Weight: 84 kg (185 lb)

Playing career^{1}
Years	Club	Games (Goals)
2010, 2014	Perth	20 (18)
2012–2013	Greater Western Sydney	3 (1)
2015–2019	Peel Thunder	100 (117)
2021	Mines Rovers	17 (22)

Representative team honours^{2}
Years	Team	Games (Goals)
2013	Indigenous All-Stars	1 (1)
- ^{1} Playing statistics correct to the end of 2021.^{2} Representative statistics correct as of 2015.

Career highlights
- Peel Thunder captain: 2016–2018; 2x WAFL premiership player: 2016, 2017

Gerald Ugle (born 31 January 1993) is a former professional Australian rules footballer who played for the Greater Western Sydney Giants in the Australian Football League (AFL).

Ugle has several relatives with AFL experience; former West Coast Eagles player Troy Ugle is his great-uncle and former Collingwood player Kirk Ugle is his first cousin.

== Early life ==
He began attending Guildford Grammar School in year 9 on an Indigenous scholarship. Playing on the football team, he eventually captained the school football team. He graduated year 12 in 2010.

As a 15-year-old he won the reserves best and fairest award for Beverley Football Club in the Avon Football Association despite missing large parts of the season.

Ugle represented Western Australia at 2009 U-16 and 2010 U-18 National Championships. He made his West Australian Football League (WAFL) league debut for Perth in round 23 of the 2010 season.

== AFL career ==
Ugle was selected as a 17-year-old by Greater Western Sydney in October 2010. In July 2012, Ugle made his AFL senior debut against Fremantle, the team he supported as a child.

In September 2013, he was delisted by the Giants, having played three AFL matches in his two years at the club.

== Post AFL career ==
After being delisted by the Giants, Ugle re-joined WAFL club Perth, signing a two-year contract with the Demons in November 2013. However, after one season with Perth, Ugle moved to Peel Thunder for the 2015 season.

With the retirement of Brendon Jones, Ugle was appointed Peel's captain for the 2016 season. Ugle captained Peel to back-to-back WAFL premierships in 2016 and 2017, defeating Subiaco on both occasions.

Season 2019 saw Ugle relinquish the captaincy to former Essendon midfielder and reigning Thunder best and fairest Ben Howlett, with Ugle taking on a mentor role to the leadership group.
