= 2019 WAFL Women's season =

- Teams: 5
- Premiers: East Fremantle; 1st premiership
- Minor premiers: Subiaco; 1st minor premiership
- Best and fairest: Hayley Miller; Subiaco; Danika Pisconeri; Subiaco (13 votes each)
- Leading goalkicker: Tarnee Tester; Subiaco (27 goals)

The 2019 WAFL Women's season was the inaugural season of the WAFL Women's (WAFLW). The season commenced on 5 May and concluded with the Grand Final on 14 September 2019. The competition was contested by five clubs, all of whom were affiliated with men's clubs from the West Australian Football League (WAFL).

== Clubs ==
- Claremont, East Fremantle, Peel Thunder, Subiaco, Swan Districts

== Ladder ==
Pos	Team	Pld	W	L	D	PF	PA	PP	Pts	Qualification
1	Subiaco	12	9	3	0	575	277	207.6	36	Finals series
2	East Fremantle (P)	12	7	5	0	493	301	163.8	28	Finals series
3	Swan Districts	12	7	5	0	497	402	123.6	28	Finals series
4	Claremont	12	6	6	0	302	455	66.4	24	Finals series
5	Peel Thunder	12	1	11	0	240	672	35.7	4	

Source: WAFL.com.au
Rules for classification: 1) points; 2) percentage; 3) number of points for.
(P) Premiers

== Finals series ==
=== Qualifying and Elimination finals ===
	Elimination Final
Sunday 1 September (1:00 pm)	Swan Districts 7.6 (48)	def.	Claremont 1.1 (7)	Steel Blue Oval	Report

	Qualifying Final
Sunday 1 September (3:35 pm)	Subiaco 2.2 (14)	def. by	East Fremantle 6.6 (42)	Leederville Oval	Report

=== Preliminary final ===
	Preliminary Final
Saturday 7 September (2:00 pm)	Subiaco 2.5 (17)	def. by	Swan Districts 9.8 (62)	Leederville Oval	Report

=== Grand Final ===
2019 WAFLW Grand Final
Saturday 14 September (2:35 pm)	East Fremantle	def.	Swan Districts	Mineral Resources Park
2.1 (13); 5.3 (33); 6.3 (39); 8.3 (51)	Q1; Q2; Q3; Final	0.1 (1); 1.2 (8); 3.2 (20); 4.4 (28)	Best on ground: Gabby O'Sullivan (East Fremantle); Television broadcast: Seven Network
R Roux, S Sparke 2 A Atkins, K Tapner, G O'Sullivan, R Ashley 1	Goals	A Sharp, K Gibson, M Hyde, S Davison 1
G Osullivan, E Gooch, R Roux, A Atkins, S Pluschke	Best	M Strom, S Cain, A Sharp, K Gibson, M Bowen
East Fremantle won their and the competition's inaugural senior women's premiership.
