= Trevor Williams (footballer) =

English footballer

Personal information
- Place of birth: Grimsby, England
- Position: Winger

Senior career*
Years	Team	Apps	(Gls)
1902	Grimsby Rangers		
1902–1904	Grimsby Town	4	(1)
1904	Grimsby Rovers		
1904–1905	Hull City		
1905–1906	Grimsby Rangers		
1906–1907	Grimsby Victoria		
1907–190?	Grimsby Rangers		
- * Club domestic league appearances and goals

Trevor Williams was an English professional footballer who played as a winger.
