= Claremont Oval =

Football stadium in Perth, Western Australia

Revo Fitness Stadium
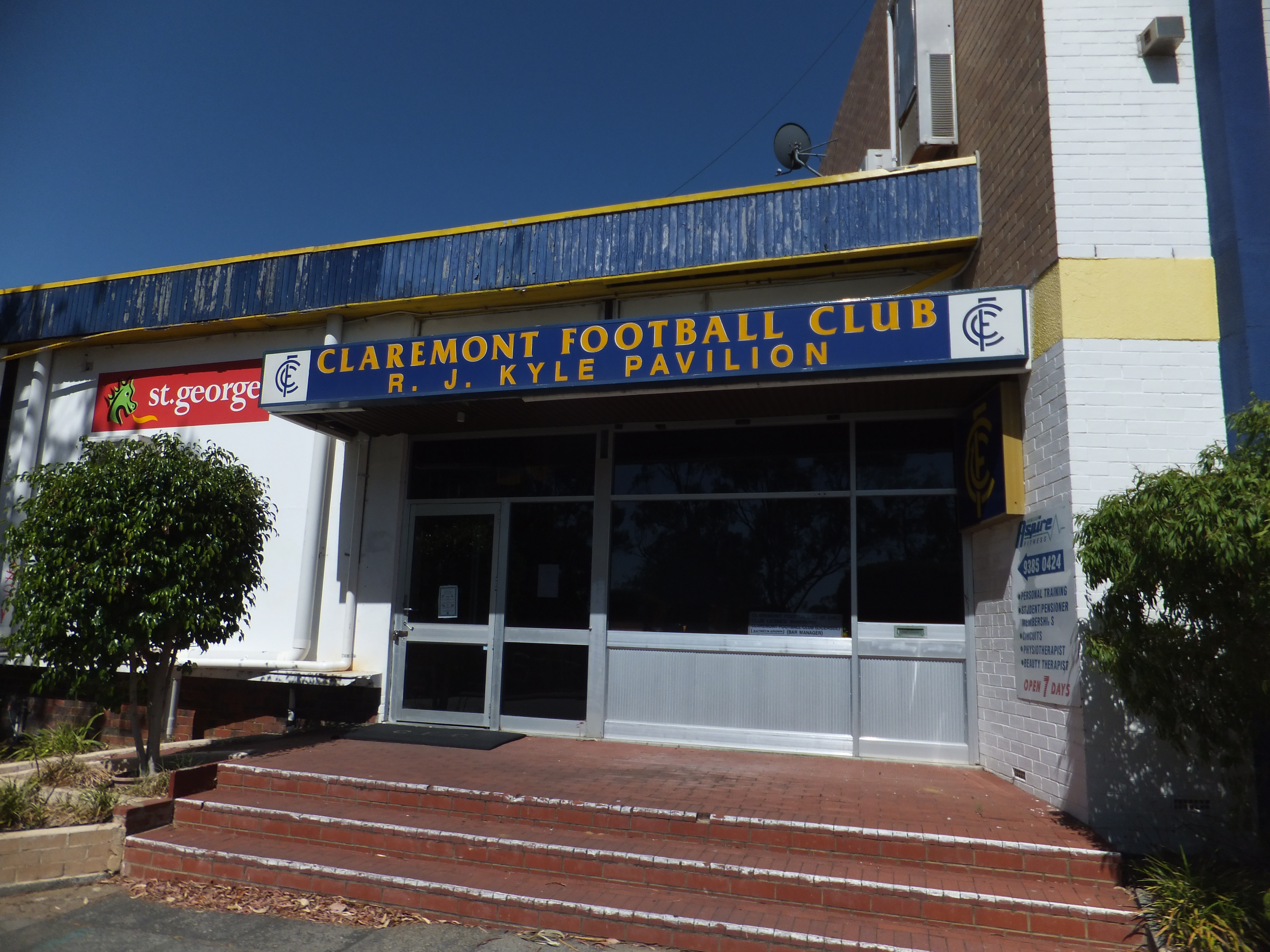
- Entry to Claremont Football Club at Claremont Oval in 2012
- Interactive map of Revo Fitness Stadium
- Former names: Claremont Recreation Ground
- Location: Davies Road, Claremont, Western Australia
- Coordinates: 31°58′42″S 115°46′58″E
- Owner: Town of Claremont
- Operator: Claremont Football Club
- Capacity: 5,000
- Surface: Grass
- Record attendance: 18,268

Construction
- Opened: 1905; 121 years ago

Tenant
- Claremont Football Club (Western Australian Football League) (1925–present)

Claremont Oval, also known by naming rights sponsorship as Revo Fitness Stadium, is an Australian rules football stadium located in Perth, Western Australia. The stadium, opened in 1905 as "Claremont Recreation Ground", seats 5,000. It is the home of the Claremont Football Club, an Australian rules football club that plays in the Western Australian Football League (WAFL), the state's premier Australian rules competition.

Before 1925, the stadium served as a cricket and soccer ground, with no fence, native bush on the eastern side, near the Claremont Showground, and the remaining area a sandy wasteland. The council spent A£5000 to bring the ground up to standard for WAFL level football in 1925, including the dumping of rubbish around the perimeter to create the sloping banks, and the construction of a grandstand, as a result of Claremont-Cottesloe's admittance to the "A" Grade of the WAFL competition for the 1926 season.

As the new ground and grandstand were not yet ready, during 1926 the club played all home games at the Claremont Showground. The first league game played at Claremont Oval was on 30 April 1927, where East Fremantle defeated Claremont-Cottesloe, 19.10 (124) to 4.12 (36).

Claremont Oval has been used by the Claremont Football Club as a home ground from that game forth, except between 1945 and 1947, where, due to the grandstand fire in 1944, and the condition of the playing surface, the club shared Subiaco Oval with the Subiaco Football Club. In 1944 the grandstand, which had been built in 1927, was destroyed by fire, which also destroyed much of the club's history, records, equipment and premiership pennants. For over ten years afterwards, old army tin sheds served as the changerooms for teams playing at Claremont Oval. The current facilities at Claremont Oval were built in 1956 and 1970 (the R. J. Kyle Pavilion), replacing the tin sheds.

The largest attendance at the ground was 18,268 when Claremont played South Fremantle on 7 May 1983.

Recently talks have been held between the Claremont Football Club and the Town of Claremont regarding the possibility of the Club relocating to the adjacent Claremont Showground and thereby freeing up Claremont Oval for possible redevelopment.

Strong moves were made with the installation of lighting at the Showground and the playing of junior football at the Showground; however the latest plans are to maintain Australian rules football at the ground and develop the land around Claremont Oval.

In 2012 redevelopment commenced of the oval, the Claremont Football Club playing games at the Claremont Showground on a temporary basis.

The plan saw most of the ground converted to apartment buildings, with a new facility for the Claremont Football Club. The capacity was reduced to 5,000.

The redevelopment involved the demolition of the existing run-down members' stand and the clearance of the other derelict structures around the ground. Numerous large trees were removed that had once been a feature of the ground.

In 2017, the new Claremont Football Club members' stand was completed. It featured a large gymnasium, an underground car park as well as improved seating, café, bar areas and function rooms. A grassed area was provided for behind the railway end goals. WAFL games have since resumed at the ground on a regular basis.

Since 2019 the Claremont Oval is now officially known as Revo Fitness Stadium following a naming-rights agreement in August 2019
