= Rushton Park =

Australian rules football ground in Western Australia

Lane Group Stadium Rushton Park
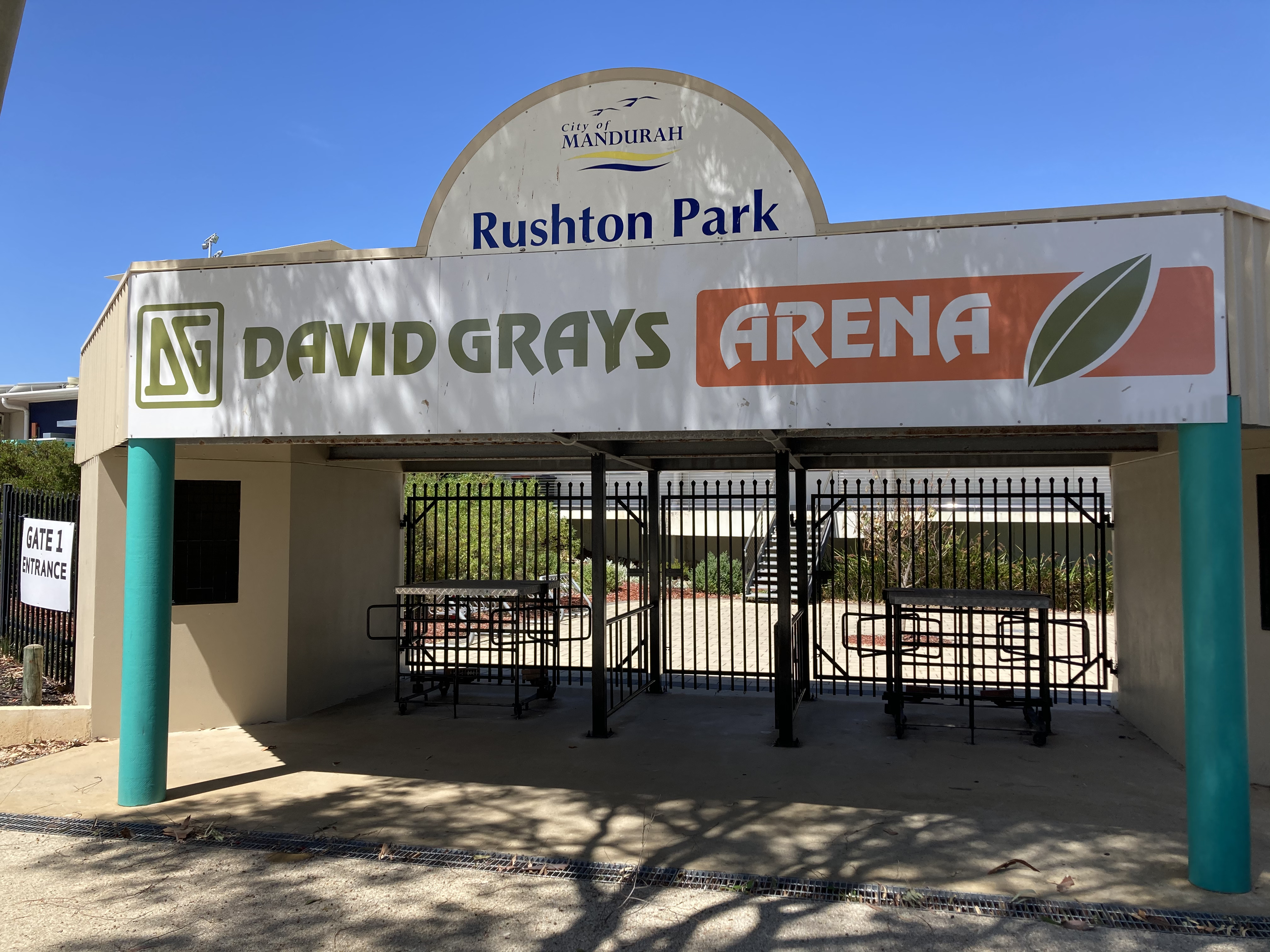
- Rushton Park, 2020
- Interactive map of Lane Group Stadium; Rushton Park
- Full name: Rushton Park
- Former names: David Grays Arena; Bendigo Bank Stadium
- Location: Dower Street, Mandurah, Western Australia
- Coordinates: 32°31′58″S 115°44′27″E
- Owner: City of Mandurah
- Capacity: 9,000
- Surface: grass
- Record attendance: 9,000 (West Coast vs. Port Adelaide, 3 March 2012)

Construction
- Built: 1960s
- Expanded: 2009–2011

Tenants
- Peel Thunder Football Club (WAFL); Mandurah Mustangs (PFL); Peel Thunderbirds (WAWFL)

Rushton Park (also known as Lane Group Stadium under ground sponsorship arrangements) is an Australian rules football ground located in Mandurah, Western Australia. Having been in use as a football ground since the early 1960s, the ground is currently used as a home ground by three clubs: the Peel Thunder, competing in the West Australian Football League (WAFL), the Mandurah Mustangs, competing in the Peel Football League (PFL), and the Peel Thunderbirds, competing in the West Australian Women's Football League (WAWFL). Rushton Park is the only regularly-used ground in the WAFL that falls outside the Perth metropolitan area.

== History ==
The area that is now Rushton Park was first gazetted as a sanitation site on 20 August 1926, and was converted to a recreation reserve in September 1958, under the Mandurah Road Board. The reserve was named for Richard Rushton, a former local government commissioner, with the new name approved on 22 May 1972. The park was first used for football in the 1960s by the Mandurah Football Club in the Sunday Football League. The ground held its first West Australian Football League (WAFL) match in April 1986 between Perth and South Fremantle, with a record attendance at the time of 7,147 people. A further game was hosted in the 1987 season, between East Perth and South Fremantle, with 4,547 in attendance. As well as football, the ground also hosted two cricket matches between a Western Australia Country XI and touring Sri Lankan and Tamil Nadu sides, in 1987 and 1988, respectively. After the Peel Thunder Football Club was accepted into the WAFL for the 1997 season, Rushton Park became its home ground. The first game of the 1997 season, against South Fremantle, drew a crowd of 5,781 people.

Attendances declined during the late 1990s and early 2000s, with an average of around 1,200 attending games at Rushton Park. A match in 2000 between Peel and East Fremantle drew only 815 people. Australian Football League (AFL) pre-season matches in 2004 (Fremantle and Kangaroos) and 2006 (West Coast and St Kilda), attracted crowds of 7,527 and 8,283 people respectively, with the latter a new ground record. In September 2009, naming rights to the ground were sold to the Bendigo Bank as part of a three-year deal. A A$9 million redevelopment of the ground, consisting of the construction of a new grandstand and facilities, began in February 2010, and was completed in June 2011. The ground hosted the 2011 State Game against Queensland in June 2011. An AFL pre-season match between West Coast and Port Adelaide during the 2012 NAB Cup was attended by approximately 9,000 people, setting a new ground record.
