= List of East Fremantle footballers who have played in the VFL/AFL =

East Fremantle has a relationship with the VFL/AFL dating back to the start of the 20th century, with numerous players moving in both directions to and from Victoria and Western Australia.

== Individual honours ==
Individual AFL honours awarded to players who played for East Fremantle

- Brownlow Medal: Shane Woewodin (2000), Simon Black (2002), Ben Cousins (2005), Patrick Cripps (2022, 2024)
- Norm Smith Medal: Simon Black (2003), Jason Johannisen (2016)
- Coleman Medal: Josh Kennedy (2015, 2016)
- All-Australian team: Chris Mainwaring (1991, 1996), Ben Cousins (1998, 1999, 2001, 2002, 2005 (vc), 2006), Simon Black (2001, 2002, 2004), Paul Hasleby (2003), Daniel Kerr (2007), Aaron Sandilands (2008, 2009, 2010, 2014), Harry Taylor (2010, 2013), Luke McPharlin (2012), Josh Kennedy (2015 (vc), 2016, 2017 (vc)), Paddy Ryder (2017), Elliot Yeo (2017, 2019), Patrick Cripps (2018, 2019), Brad Sheppard (2020)
- VFL/AFL Premiership: Fred Mann (1901), George Lockwood (1902, 1903), Percy Trotter (1904, 1905), Harvey Kelly (1907, 1908), Jack Scobie (1909), Les Jones (1939), Brian Roberts (1973, 1974), Ken Judge (1983), Michael Brennan (1992, 1994), Paul Harding (1992), Chris Mainwaring (1992, 1994), Chris Waterman (1992, 1994), Peter Wilson (1992, 1994), Earl Spalding (1995), Chad Rintoul (1997), Simon Black (2001, 2002, 2003), Josh Carr (2004), Domenic Cassisi (2004), Daniel Chick (2006), Ben Cousins (2006), Daniel Kerr (2006), Harry Taylor (2009, 2011), Jason Johannisen (2016), Jamie Cripps (2018), Josh Kennedy (2018), Chris Masten (2018), Elliot Yeo (2018)

== Played in the AFL ==
There is a list of past and present East Fremantle players who have played at AFL/VFL:

- Ron Alexander (Fitzroy)
- Aliir Aliir (Sydney Swans/ Port Adelaide)
- Liam Anthony (North Melbourne)
- Dale Baynes (Collingwood)
- Darren Bennett (West Coast Eagles and Melbourne)
- Scott Bennett (West Coast Eagles)
- Bill Berry (Essendon, Footscray and North Melbourne)
- Simon Black (Brisbane Lions)
- Tony Bourke (Carlton)
- Mark Bradly (Melbourne)
- Jacob Brennan (West Coast Eagles)
- Michael Brennan (West Coast Eagles)
- Mitch Brown (West Coast Eagles)
- Ricky Browne (Geelong)
- Clinton Browning (West Coast Eagles)
- Ben Bucovaz (Fremantle)
- Tony Buhagiar (Essendon and Footscray)
- Bill Burns (1884–1955) (Geelong and Richmond)
- Craig Burrows (Fremantle)
- Bobby Byers (1871–1952) (Essendon)
- Josh Carr (Port Adelaide and Fremantle)
- Matthew Carr (St.Kilda and Fremantle)
- Jeff Cassidy (Geelong)
- Domenic Cassisi (Port Adelaide)
- Daniel Chick (Hawthorn and West Coast Eagles)
- Mitch Clark (Brisbane Lions, Melbourne and Geelong)
- Matthew Clucas (Fremantle)
- Michael Collica (Hawthorn and West Coast Eagles)
- Rhys Cooyou (GWS)
- Ben Cousins (West Coast Eagles and Richmond)
- Jesse Crichton (Fremantle)
- Jamie Cripps (St.Kilda and West Coast Eagles)
- Patrick Cripps (Carlton)
- Bradd Dalziell (Brisbane Lions and West Coast Eagles)
- Peter Davidson (West Coast Eagles and Brisbane Bears)
- Laurie Dearle (1919–1979) (Essendon)
- Gary Dhurrkay (1974–2005) (Fremantle and Kangaroos)
- Brad Dick (Collingwood)
- Brad Dodd (Fremantle)
- Steven Dodd (Fremantle)
- Norman Doig (1910–2001) (Essendon)
- Max Duffy (Fremantle)
- Ryley Dunn (Fremantle)
- Simon Eastaugh (Essendon and Fremantle)
- Stephen Edgar (Carlton)
- Shane Ellis (West Coast Eagles)
- Alex Fasolo (Collingwood)
- Brendon Feddema (Fremantle)
- Neil Ferguson (1945–2016) (Hawthorn)
- Charlie Foletta (1875–1966) (Fitzroy)
- Andrew Foster (Fremantle)
- Damien Gaspar (Melbourne)
- Tim Gepp (Richmond and Footscray)
- Eric Glass (1910–1985) (Melbourne)
- Bill Goddard (1880–1939) (South Melbourne, Carlton and St. Kilda)
- Martin Gotz (1883–1967) (Carlton)
- Doug Green (South Melbourne)
- Kasey Green (West Coast Eagles and Kangaroos)
- Jonathon Griffin (Adelaide and Fremantle)
- Richard Hadley (Brisbane Lions and Carlton)
- Paul Harding (Hawthorn, St. Kilda and West Coast Eagles)
- Kyle Hardingham (Essendon)
- Paul Hasleby (Fremantle)
- Tim Houlihan (West Coast Eagles)
- Kingsley Hunter (Fremantle, Western Bulldogs and Hawthorn)
- Garrick Ibbotson (Fremantle)
- Jarrad Jansen (Brisbane Lions)
- Michael Jez (Carlton)
- Jason Johannisen (Western Bulldogs)
- Courtney Johns (Essendon)
- Bob Johnson (1935–2001) (Melbourne)
- Dick Jones (South Melbourne)
- Les Jones (1910–1956) (Melbourne)
- Ken Judge (1958–2016) (Hawthorn and Brisbane Bears)
- Ernie Kelly (1884–1939) (Carlton)
- Harvey Kelly (1883–1944) (South Melbourne and Carlton)
- Otto Kelly (1880–1946) (South Melbourne)
- Josh Kennedy (Carlton and West Coast Eagles)
- Daniel Kerr (West Coast Eagles)
- Haydon Kilmartin (Melbourne and Hawthorn)
- Brendan Krummel (West Coast Eagles, Fremantle and Hawthorn)
- Rod Lester-Smith (Hawthorn and Brisbane Bears)
- Paul Lindsay (Geelong)
- George Lockwood (1872–19??) (Geelong and Collingwood)
- Andrew Lockyer (West Coast Eagles)
- Tarkyn Lockyer (Collingwood)
- Kane Lucas (Carlton)
- Greg Madigan (Hawthorn and Fremantle)
- Chris Mainwaring (1965–2007) (West Coast Eagles)
- Steve Malaxos (Hawthorn and West Coast Eagles)
- Fred Mann (1878–1970) (Essendon)
- Jonathon Marsh (Collingwood)
- Chris Masten (West Coast Eagles)
- Mark McGough (Collingwood and St. Kilda)
- Shaun McManus (Fremantle)
- Jamie McNamara (West Coast Eagles)
- Luke McPharlin (Hawthorn and Fremantle)
- Graham Melrose (North Melbourne)
- Sam Menegola (Geelong)
- Gerard Neesham (Sydney Swans)
- Brock O'Brien (Fremantle)
- Rhys Palmer (Fremantle, GWS and Carlton)
- Marco Paparone (Brisbane Lions)
- Brett Peake (Fremantle and St. Kilda)
- Brian Peake (Geelong)
- Graham Polak (Fremantle and Richmond)
- Andrew Purser (Footscray)
- Peter Quill (Footscray)
- David Rankin (Fitzroy)
- Phillip Read (West Coast Eagles and Melbourne)
- Alan Reid (Essendon and Geelong)
- Curtis Reid (1876–1912) (Melbourne)
- Lin Richards (1909–1992) (South Melbourne)
- Chad Rintoul (Adelaide, West Coast Eagles and Collingwood)
- Brian Roberts (1945–2016) (Richmond and South Melbourne)
- Brad Rowe (Brisbane Bears, Collingwood and Fremantle)
- Paddy Ryder (Essendon, Port Adelaide and St. Kilda)
- Aaron Sandilands (Fremantle)
- Eric Sarich (South Melbourne)
- Jayden Schofield (Western Bulldogs)
- Jack Scobie (1891–1974) (South Melbourne and Carlton)
- Jim Sewell (Footscray)
- Jack Sheedy (South Melbourne)
- Brad Sheppard (West Coast Eagles)
- Scott Simister (Melbourne)
- Dwayne Simpson (Fremantle)
- Josh Simpson (Fremantle)
- Brad Smith (North Melbourne)
- Kaleb Smith Richmond
- Earl Spalding (Melbourne and Carlton)
- Scott Spalding (Carlton)
- Matt Spangher (West Coast Eagles, Sydney Swans and Hawthorn)
- Ray Sterrett (Geelong)
- Koby Stevens (West Coast Eagles, Western Bulldogs and St. Kilda)
- Cameron Sutcliffe (Fremantle)
- Andrew Swallow (North Melbourne)
- David Swallow (Gold Coast)
- Bill Talbot (1895–1983) (South Melbourne and St. Kilda)
- Harry Taylor (Geelong)
- Kevin Taylor (South Melbourne and Fitzroy)
- Laurie Tetley (1921–1994) (South Melbourne)
- Ian Thomson (South Melbourne)
- Bert Thornley (Carlton)
- Craig Treleven (Hawthorn)
- Percy Trotter (1883–1959) (Fitzroy)
- Bruce Tschirpig (Richmond)
- Brad Tunbridge (Sydney Swans)
- Mario Turco (North Melbourne)
- Michael Warren (Fremantle)
- Chris Waterman (West Coast Eagles)
- Colin Waterson (Richmond)
- Matthew Watson (Carlton)
- Luke Weller (Brisbane Lions and Richmond)
- Darren Williams (Essendon)
- Leigh Willison (Geelong)
- Peter Wilson (Richmond and West Coast Eagles)
- Shane Woewodin (Melbourne and Collingwood)
- Murray Wrensted (West Coast Eagles and Collingwood)
- Elliot Yeo (Brisbane Lions and West Coast Eagles)
