= 1997 Westar Rules Grand Final =

Australian rules football game

| South Fremantle | East Fremantle |
|---|---|
| 13.7 (85) | 11.13 (79) |
- Date: 21 September 1997
- Stadium: Subiaco Oval
- Attendance: 32,371

Accolades
- Simpson Medal: David Hynes (South Fremantle)

The 1997 Westar Rules Grand Final was an Australian rules football game contested between the South Fremantle Football Club and the East Fremantle Football Club, on 21 September 1997 at Subiaco Oval, to determine the premier team of the Westar Rules (known previously and since as the West Australian Football League, WAFL) for the 1997 season. South Fremantle won the game by 6 points, 13.7 (85) to 11.13 (79), with David Hynes of South Fremantle winning the Simpson Medal as best on ground.

== Season summary ==
The season started with the introduction of a ninth team, the Peel Thunder Football Club. They were the first new team admitted to the league for over 60 years. The league also was rebranded from the West Australian Football League to Westar Rules. A new prize was also created to be given to the premiership winning team, the Drivesafe Cup.

South Fremantle finished the home and away season on top of the ladder, a game and a half ahead of East Fremantle, who were celebrating their 100th season in the league, and Perth, with East Perth finishing in fourth position. Swan Districts started the season with six wins, but faded in the second half of the season to miss the finals, along with the 1996 Premiers, Claremont who finished second last. Peel struggled to compete with the more established teams, winning only one game for the season, against the reigning premiers Claremont by 3 points in Round 7.

In the finals, Perth easily beat East Perth in the First Semi Final. In the Second Semi Final, East Fremantle upset South Fremantle by 10 points with Damian Condon keeping South's key forward Jon Dorotich to only one goal. South Fremantle bounced back in the preliminary final, beating Perth by 37 points.

The main individual awards for the season were dominated by South Fremantle's veteran Jon Dorotich, who won most of the media awards and the Bernie Naylor Medal as the leading goalkicker. East Perth's Brady Anderson won the Sandover Medal with 30 votes, 3 votes ahead of East Fremantle's Haydon Kilmartin and South Fremantle's Stephen Pears. Dean Rioli won the rising star award.

== Grand final ==
The derby grand final was the third in nineteen years, with East Fremantle winning in both 1979 and 1992. In 1997, the teams had met four times, with each team winning twice; South won the first of the season and in the final round of the season, East Fremantle won the Foundation Day derby and the Second Semi Final.

East Fremantle was in front for most of the match, leading by 15, 16 and 17 points at the quarter-time, half-time and three quarter-time breaks. Adrian Bromage was East Fremantle's best player, with over twenty possessions in the first half. David Hart, playing in his last game of senior football, however was able to negate him in the second half. In South's forward line, Damian Condon again held Jon Dorotich to a single goal and Peter Sumich injured his thigh in the opening quarter and was unable to take any further part in the game. The turning point came with only minutes to go when Warren Campbell was involved in two critical plays. He chased and tackled Rhett Bowden, causing the ball to spill to Dean Rioli who kicked his fourth goal of the game. Campbell then took a mark approximately 70 metres from goal, too far out to score, but Scott Spalding collided into him after he had completed the mark. The umpire awarded a 50-metre penalty and Campbell kicked the goal to put South Fremantle in front. Defender Peter Kelly then took a brave mark in front of the East Fremantle goal to prevent them from scoring with seconds left to play.

It was South Fremantle's eleventh premiership, 17 years after their previous win. Their coach, John Todd was the Swan Districts coach in 1980 who lost to South. Todd's win made him only the second person to coach three teams to WAFL premierships, matching the performance of Ross Hutchinson and his six premierships as a coach set a new record.

Two of the 1997 South Fremantle team are sons of 1980 players; Clem Michael is the son of Stephen Michael and Warren Campbell is the son of Basil Campbell, and Dean Rioli is the nephew of Maurice Rioli who won the Simpson Medal in 1980.

== Match ==
1997 Westar Rules Grand Final
Sunday, 21 September 1997, 2:20pm | South Fremantle | def. | East Fremantle | Subiaco Oval (crowd: 32,371) | Report
3.1 (19); 6.2 (38); 8.5 (53); 13.7 (85) | Q1; Q2; Q3; Final | 5.4 (34); 8.6 (54); 10.10 (70); 11.13 (79) | Umpires: T Garrett, A Binks, W French; Simpson Medal: David Hynes
Rioli 4 Hart, Campbell 2 Dorotich, Bootsma, Pears, Worsfold, Johnson 1 | Goals | 3 O'Brien; 2 Dodd, Mellody; 1 Willison, Bromage, Stockden Bilcich
Hynes, Porter, Michael, Hart, Rioli, Pears, Black | Best | Bromage, Condon, Mellody, Kilmartin, Roser, Dodd
Peter Sumich (thigh) | Injuries
Reports | Scott Spalding (EF) for striking Jess Sinclair (SF)

=== Teams ===
1997 South Fremantle Premiership Team
| B: | David Hynes | John Porter | David Hart |
| HB: | Peter Kelly | Peter Sumich | Kingsley Hutcherson |
| C: | Jess Sinclair | Heath Black | Darryn Rennick |
| HF: | Brad Bootsma | Stephen Pears | Clem Michael |
| F: | Warren Campbell | Jon Dorotich | Peter Worsfold |
| Foll: | Marty Atkins | Tom Bottrell | David Gault |
| Int: | Troy Johnson | Greg Wootton | Dean Rioli |
| Coach: | John Todd | | |

1997 East Fremantle Grand Final Team
| B: | Stephen Malaxos | Damian Condon | Jon Kerr |
| HB: | Haydon Kilmartin | Craig Burrows | Scott Spalding |
| C: | Jon Stagg | Rhett Bowden | Wayne Roser |
| HF: | Gary Dhurrkay | Chris Smith | Steve O'Brien |
| F: | Brad Dodd | Leigh Willison | Paul Lindsay |
| Foll: | Justin Sanders | Stephen Bilcich | Martin Mellody |
| Int: | Adrian Bromage | Brett Warren | Marshall Stockden |
| Coach: | Tony Micale | | |
