= 1998 Westar Rules Grand Final =

The 1998 Westar Rules Grand Final was an Australian rules football game contested between East Fremantle and West Perth on Sunday, 20 September 1998, at Subiaco Oval in Perth, Western Australia to determine the premier team of Westar Rules for the 1998 season. East Fremantle won convincingly by forty-three points, 20.10 (130) to 13.9 (87), taking out their twenty-ninth premiership but their last as of 2022.

In the process, the Sharks achieved their sixteenth consecutive win, having lost during the season only to Claremont and Subiaco in their fifth and sixth matches. It constituted the most consecutive wins ending in a Westar/WAFL/WANFL premiership since East Fremantle had achieved a unique undefeated season in 1946. After the game Shark coach Tony Micale said that the 1998 team must rank as one of the greatest in East Fremantle history.

East Fremantle and West Perth had completely dominated the season, finishing five games and over fifty-eight percent clear of their nearest rivals for the premiership, but the Sharks showed their superiority in the second semi-final by holding the Falcons to three goals in completely fine conditions and West Perth only overcame Subiaco in the preliminary due to a brilliant solo goal from Neil Mildenhall, so East Fremantle entered as hot favourites with odds of 1/4 to win their third premiership of the 1990s.

As it turned out, despite major injuries to Leigh Willison, Wayne Roser and Steve O‘Brien, East Fremantle were, after kicking into a wind in the opening quarter, always ahead of the Falcons. They kicked the first three goals and at no point did West Perth get closer than the ten-point quarter time margin. Three successive goals early in the third quarter were responded to by the Falcons, but late in that period the Sharks kicked four goals without reply to be thirty-eight points ahead and West Perth coach John Dimmer knew then his team would lose.

Adrian Bromage (East Fremantle) won the Simpson Medal as best on ground, completing a rare double of winning the Sandover Medal and Simpson Medal in the same season.

== Teams ==
=== East Fremantle ===
FB:	Jon Stagg	John Kerr	Scott Spalding
HB:	Marshall Stockden	Greg Madigan	Michael Collica
C:	Gary Dhurrkay	Martin Mellody	Chris Pobjoy
HF:	Steve O‘Brien	Earl Spalding	Stephen Bilcich
FF:	Clint Kirey	Damien Condon	Leigh Willison
R:	Greg Egan	Adrian Bromage	Wayne Roser
I:	Matthew Clucas	Justin Sanders	Rhett Bowden
Coach:	Tony Micale		

=== West Perth ===
FB:	Luke Rayner	Ryan Webb	Digby Morrell
HB:	Paul Mifka	Brendon Barrows	Peter Julian
C:	Darren O‘Brien	Kim Rigoll	Callum Chambers
HF:	Christian Kelly	Dean Brunton	Andrew Williams
FF:	Heath Younie	Troy Wilson	Corey Johnson
R:	Ron Skender	Brendon Logan	Bryce Steel
I:	Neil Mildenhall	Steve Trewhella	Chris Rigoll
Coach:	John Dimmer		

== Match details ==
1998 Westar Rules Grand Final
Sunday, 20 September	East Fremantle	def.	West Perth	Subiaco Oval (crowd: 23,258)
4.1 (25); 7.4 (46); 14.7 (91); 20.10 (130)	Q1; Q2; Q3; Final	2.3 (15); 5.5 (35); 8.5 (53); 13.9 (87)	Umpires: Adam Binks, Wayne French, Simon Gill; Simpson Medal: Adrian Bromage (East Fremantle)
Condon 4 Bilcich, Egan 3 Dhurrkay 2 Roser, Clucas, Kirey, E. Spalding, O‘Brien, Willison, Bromage, Pobjoy 1	Goals	5 Brunton; 4 Logan; 2 Williams; 1 Johnson, Darren O‘Brien
Bromage, Bilcich, Condon, Sanders, Collica, Stagg	Best	Barrows, Brunton, Rayner, Skender, Logan, Wilson
Willison (ankle); Roser (thigh); S. O‘Brien (knee); Madigan (ankle); Bowden (ankle)	Injuries
