= 1997 Westar Rules season =

1997 premiership season
- Teams: 9
- Premiers: South Fremantle; 11th premiership
- Minor premiers: South Fremantle; 10th minor premiership
- Sandover Medallist: Brady Anderson (East Perth)
- Leading goalkicker: Jon Dorotich (South Fremantle)
- Matches played: 94

The 1997 Westar Rules season was the 113th season of senior football in Perth, Western Australia. It featured a number of dramatic changes to a competition whose popularity had been dramatically reduced by the drain of players to the Eagles and Dockers of the AFL. The competition's name was changed from the prosaic "West Australian Football League" to "Westar Rules" in an attempt to update the local competition for a more sophisticated audience. However, this change became regarded as unsuccessful and was reversed as per recommendations of the "Fong Report" after four seasons. West Perth also changed their name to "Joondalup" to recognise their location in Perth's growing northwestern suburbs, but changed back after the ninth round.

More significantly, after intense debate for a number of years about whether to expand or contract the competition, a new team, Peel Thunder, was added, despite requests from Peel's licence holders that they not be required to enter before 1998. This was the first change to the number of teams in the WA(N)FL for sixty-three years.

In their first eighteen seasons, Peel won only seventy-three matches out of 354 for a winning percentage of 20.6%, never had a winning season, and finished with nine wooden spoons. Along with occasional serious financial difficulties, this produced serious criticism of their admission in subsequent years, but Peel qualified for the finals for the first time in 2015, and won the premiership the following season. A proposal to limit Westar to players under 25 and a few older veterans in order to allow a better flow of players to the AFL was made during the season but rejected.

Affected badly by the erratic availability of a number of AFL-listed players, reigning premiers Claremont had their worst season since 1975 and equalled East Fremantle's decline in 1980 from premiers to only five wins, whilst Swan Districts, brilliant but erratic during 1996, began with nine wins in their first ten matches before losing eight of their next nine to miss the finals for the third successive season.

On a more positive side, the season saw South Fremantle win its first premiership in seventeen years in a thrilling comeback Grand Final win over traditional rivals East Fremantle, and Perth, after a disastrous opening, have its only winning season between 1989 and 2024, culminating in its last finals appearance until 2020.

== Home-and-away season ==
=== Round 1 ===
	Round 1
Saturday, 29 March	Perth 2.5 (17)	def. by	Swan Districts 11.9 (75)	Lathlain Park (crowd: 1317)
Sunday, 30 March	Peel Thunder 8.4 (52)	def. by	South Fremantle 25.10 (160)	Rushton Park (crowd: 5781)
Monday, 31 March	Claremont 11.7 (73)	def. by	East Perth 11.18 (84)	Claremont Oval (crowd: 2686)
Monday, 31 March	Joondalup 11.9 (75)	def. by	East Fremantle 11.15 (81)	Arena Joondalup (crowd: 2841)
	Bye; Subiaco
Playing during an unseasonal thunderstorm, Perth kick its lowest score since 1952 and second-lowest since 1919. Its two goals were both from free kicks for ruck infringements, the first at the twenty-minute mark of the third quarter and the other in time-on of the last.; The sole lower score Swan Districts have ever held an opponent to is Claremont's 1.7 (13) the previous season; the previous lowest by the Demons against the Swans was a winning score of 5.11 (41) after being goalless at half-time in 1973.; Injury-plagued ruckman Travis Edmonds dominates along with forward Bernard Carney, Brendan Retzlaff, Troy Ugle and Stewart Kestrel who had not been together in 1995 and 1996; Debutant Peel kick the first goal against the Bulldogs and are in front until early in the second quarter before being overwhelmed

=== Round 2 ===
	Round 2
Saturday, 5 April	East Fremantle 15.18 (108)	def.	Peel Thunder 7.9 (51)	East Fremantle Oval (crowd: 1448)
Saturday, 5 April	South Fremantle 11.13 (79)	def. by	Subiaco 16.11 (107)	Fremantle Oval (crowd: 1779)
Saturday, 5 April	Claremont 6.10 (46)	def. by	Perth 13.8 (86)	Claremont Oval (crowd: 1138)
Saturday, 5 April	Swan Districts 20.19 (139)	def.	Joondalup 8.5 (53)	Bassendean Oval (crowd: 2107)
	Bye; East Perth
Following their shocker against Swans, Perth coach Wayne Blackwell punished his side with a five-hour Tuesday training session and they respond with an excellent win in slippery conditions.

=== Round 3 ===
	Round 3
Saturday, 12 April	Swan Districts 15.14 (104)	def.	Claremont 11.7 (73)	Bassendean Oval (crowd: 2183)
Saturday, 12 April	Subiaco 27.20 (182)	def.	Peel Thunder 5.5 (35)	Subiaco Oval (crowd: 1531)
Saturday, 12 April	Joondalup 8.14 (62)	def. by	East Perth 14.13 (97)	Bunbury (crowd: 2212)
	Bye; East Fremantle, Perth, South Fremantle
Subiaco had their biggest ever win in open-age WAFL football, beating their famous record from the 1959 first semi-final, though they have beaten the record several times during their 2000s WAFL dynasty.; Troy Ugle does two brilliant shepherds and two difficult snap shots to derail a comeback by Claremont that threatened to give the Tigers their first win.

=== Round 4 ===
	Round 4
Friday, 18 April (7:30 pm)	South Fremantle 17.14 (116)	def.	East Fremantle 11.9 (75)	Fremantle Oval (crowd: 5328)
Saturday, 19 April	Perth 11.13 (79)	def.	East Perth 5.12 (42)	Lathlain Park (crowd: 2603)
Saturday, 19 April	Peel Thunder 9.9 (63)	def. by	Swan Districts 26.18 (174)	Rushton Park (crowd: 2006)
Saturday, 19 April	Joondalup 15.13 (103)	def.	Subiaco 8.9 (57)	Arena Joondalup (crowd: 2202)
	Bye; Claremont
For the first time, a night match is played at Fremantle Oval, and the experiment is an instant success that later led to lights at most league venues.

=== Round 5 (Anzac Day) ===
	Round 5
Friday, 25 April	Subiaco 8.8 (56)	def. by	Perth 25.11 (161)	Subiaco Oval (crowd: 1413)
Friday, 25 April	East Perth 17.12 (114)	def. by	South Fremantle 19.11 (125)	Perth Oval (crowd: 2324)
Saturday, 26 April	Joondalup 27.23 (185)	def.	Peel Thunder 9.11 (65)	Arena Joondalup (crowd: 1383)
Saturday, 26 April	East Fremantle 16.11 (107)	def.	Claremont 14.14 (98)	East Fremantle Oval (crowd: 1638)
	Bye; Swan Districts
The Subiaco v Perth game was curtain-raiser to an AFL game between Fremantle and St Kilda, an experiment regarded as a success but not supported by Westar Rules' clubs.; Peel defender Scott Simister kicks an amazing 85-metre goal after a 50 metre penalty on the final siren against Joondalup.

=== Round 6 ===
	Round 6
Saturday, 3 May	Claremont 15.7 (97)	def. by	South Fremantle 16.13 (109)	Claremont Oval (crowd: 1347)
Saturday, 3 May	Subiaco 9.15 (69)	def.	East Perth 10.8 (68)	Subiaco Oval (crowd: 1889)
Saturday, 3 May	Perth 10.11 (71)	def. by	Joondalup 13.9 (87)	Lathlain Park (crowd: 2156)
Saturday, 3 May	East Fremantle 14.13 (97)	def. by	Swan Districts 18.7 (115)	East Fremantle Oval (crowd: 2076)
	Bye; Peel Thunder
The return of "Spider" Burton helps the Lions contrive a win by the narrowest of margins after being nineteen points behind with less than ten minutes remaining. East Perth's errors cost it severely.; Former Falcon forward Troy Wilson is moved to defence and Joondalup beat the Demons due to his power.

=== Round 7 ===
	Round 7
Saturday, 10 May	Perth 13.10 (88)	def.	East Fremantle 11.8 (74)	Lathlain Park (crowd: 1443)
Saturday, 10 May	South Fremantle 26.17 (173)	def.	Peel Thunder 8.7 (55)	Fremantle Oval (crowd: 1700)
Saturday, 10 May	Claremont 13.18 (96)	def.	Subiaco 7.12 (54)	Claremont Oval (crowd: 1467)
Sunday, 11 May	Swan Districts 20.11 (131)	def.	East Perth 17.10 (112)	Bassendean Oval (crowd: 2656)
	Bye; Joondalup
Peel Thunder set a WAFL record of four consecutive losses by over 100 points. Despite continued woeful on-field performances the Thunder have never equalled this debut-season ignominy.; Jon Dorotich kicks 9.8 (62) as South Fremantle kick eleven goals to one after Peel showed some improvement for three quarters.; Aided by five AFL discards, reigning premiers Claremont win its first game for 1997, with ruckman Greg Egan defeating a higher-profile relegation from the AFL in "Spider" Burton.

=== Round 8 ===
	Round 8
Saturday, 17 May	East Perth 9.10 (64)	def. by	East Fremantle 15.9 (99)	Perth Oval (crowd: 1862)
Saturday, 17 May	South Fremantle 23.14 (152)	def.	Perth 10.7 (67)	Fremantle Oval (crowd: 2204)
Saturday, 17 May	Joondalup 18.12 (120)	def.	Swan Districts 10.12 (72)	Arena Joondalup (crowd: 2734)
Saturday, 17 May	Claremont 14.11 (95)	def. by	Peel Thunder 14.14 (98)	Anniversary Park (crowd: 1005)
	Bye; Subiaco
Peel Thunder win one of only two games during their first three seasons, beating the reigning premiers in a match played to celebrate the centenary of the satellite town of Rockingham. Their first "home" win was not until 2000, and ironically was also against the Tigers.; The extremely small size of Anniversary Park prevented the running game that had made the Thunder look third-rate from establishing itself.; Jon Dorotich kicks 13.2 for South Fremantle in their big win over Perth.; Fremantle-listed ruckman Matthew Whitelaw thrashes Sandover hopeful Travis Edmonds as Joondalup end Swans' unbeaten start by kicking the last twelve goals

=== Round 9 ===
	Round 9
Saturday, 24 May	Subiaco 10.10 (70)	def. by	South Fremantle 18.17 (125)	Subiaco Oval (crowd: 1399)
Saturday, 24 May	Swan Districts 16.15 (111)	def.	Perth 7.10 (52)	Bassendean Oval (crowd: 1938)
Saturday, 24 May	Claremont 8.11 (59)	def. by	Joondalup 14.12 (96)	Claremont Oval (crowd: 1119)
Saturday, 24 May	Peel Thunder 11.5 (71)	def. by	East Perth 12.22 (94)	Rushton Park (crowd: 1858)
	Bye; East Fremantle
East Perth discard Spiro Mallis effectively ends the reigning premiers' finals hopes with a superb display on the wing.; An inaccurate East Perth hold out Peel in windy conditions but lose key ruckman Jeremy Crough and forward Brady Anderson to injuries, leaving the previous season's grand finalists appearing troubled.

=== Round 10 (Foundation Day) ===
	Round 10
Saturday, 31 May	Subiaco 22.15 (147)	def.	Peel Thunder 6.11 (47)	Subiaco Oval (crowd: 981)
Monday, 2 June	East Fremantle 14.13 (97)	def.	South Fremantle 8.12 (60)	East Fremantle Oval (crowd: 5531)
Monday, 2 June	West Perth 14.8 (92)	def. by	East Perth 19.14 (128)	Arena Joondalup (crowd: 2298)
	Bye; Claremont, Perth, Swan Districts
West Perth discarded "Joondalup" and return to their long-established club name during the week before this round.

=== Round 11 ===
	Round 11
Saturday, 7 June	Swan Districts 33.8 (206)	def.	Peel Thunder 7.9 (51)	Bassendean Oval (crowd: 1844)
Saturday, 7 June	East Fremantle 10.5 (65)	def. by	West Perth 18.11 (119)	East Fremantle Oval (crowd: 2035)
Saturday, 7 June	Perth 18.9 (117)	def.	Subiaco 17.7 (109)	Lathlain Park (crowd: 1886)
Saturday, 7 June	East Perth 16.8 (104)	def.	Claremont 14.12 (96)	Perth Oval (crowd: 2154)
	Bye; South Fremantle
Swan Districts kick the second most accurate score in WAFL history, with Aboriginal forward Troy Ugle kicking twelve, which despite the Thunder's continued ineptitude remains a record by one player against them

=== Round 12 ===
	Round 12
Saturday, 14 June	South Fremantle 9.6 (60)	def. by	West Perth 14.10 (94)	Fremantle Oval (crowd: 2341)
Saturday, 14 June	Claremont 14.6 (90)	def.	East Fremantle 12.12 (84)	Claremont Oval (crowd: 1233)
Saturday, 14 June	Swan Districts 19.20 (134)	def.	Subiaco 16.4 (100)	Bassendean Oval (crowd: 2252)
Saturday, 14 June	Peel Thunder 6.7 (43)	def. by	Perth 17.19 (121)	Rushton Park (crowd: 1363)
	Bye; East Perth
Claremont, aided by the return of AFL discards Tony Delaney, Michael Gardiner and Anthony Jones, record a fine win over the eventual Grand finalists.

=== Round 13 ===
	Round 13
Saturday, 21 June	West Perth 17.23 (125)	def.	Subiaco 5.10 (40)	Arena Joondalup (crowd: 2057)
Saturday, 21 June	Perth 14.12 (96)	def.	South Fremantle 9.11 (65)	Lathlain Park (crowd: 1887)
Saturday, 21 June	East Fremantle 14.7 (91)	def.	East Perth 9.10 (64)	East Fremantle Oval (crowd: 1785)
Sunday, 22 June	Swan Districts 10.6 (66)	def. by	Claremont 17.12 (114)	Bassendean Oval (crowd: 2407)
	Bye; Peel Thunder
West Perth thrash Subiaco as a tribute to Wayne "Terror" Dayman, who died in an industrial accident on the Monday, despite losing five players to state duty; East Perth fade out against a depleted Shark team after leading 7.8 (50) to 1.3 (9) entering time-on in the second quarter.

=== Round 14 ===
	Round 14
Saturday, 28 June	East Perth 24.14 (158)	def.	Peel Thunder 7.8 (50)	Perth Oval (crowd: 1418)
Saturday, 28 June	South Fremantle 16.12 (108)	def.	Swan Districts 8.8 (56)	Fremantle Oval (crowd: 2282)
Saturday, 28 June	Perth 11.18 (84)	def. by	Claremont 13.13 (91)	Lathlain Park (crowd: 1739)
Sunday, 29 June	Subiaco 8.7 (55)	def. by	East Fremantle 28.15 (183)	Subiaco Oval (crowd: 1347)
	Bye; West Perth
East Fremantle record their biggest ever win over Subiaco, and also their biggest away win over any opponent.

=== Round 15 ===
	Round 15
Saturday, 5 July	Claremont 8.9 (57)	v	West Perth 14.10 (94)	Claremont Oval (crowd: 1520)
Saturday, 5 July	East Perth 13.13 (91)	def.	Swan Districts 12.9 (81)	Perth Oval (crowd: 2751)
Saturday, 5 July	Peel Thunder 7.4 (46)	def. by	South Fremantle 18.14 (122)	Rushton Park (crowd: 1249)
Saturday, 5 July	East Fremantle 10.15 (75)	def. by	Perth 13.7 (85)	East Fremantle Oval (crowd: 1559)
	Bye; Subiaco
Perth coach Wayne Blackwell is reported for disputing a decision on the sideline, but his team move into the four by breaking down East Fremantle attacks very efficiently.; South Fremantle coach John Todd blasts Peel as uncompetitive in a spiteful game with six reports.

=== Round 16 ===
	Round 16
Saturday, 12 July	Subiaco 14.9 (93)	def.	Claremont 9.12 (66)	Subiaco Oval (crowd: 1184)
Saturday, 12 July	West Perth 14.8 (92)	def. by	Perth 18.9 (117)	Arena Joondalup (crowd: 2207)
Saturday, 12 July	South Fremantle 12.11 (83)	drew with	East Perth 12.11 (83)	Fremantle Oval (crowd: 2670)
Saturday, 12 July	Peel Thunder 12.8 (80)	def. by	East Fremantle 22.11 (143)	Rushton Park (crowd: 1351)
	Bye; Swan Districts
In an all-day thriller South Fremantle and East Perth played the second and last WASFL/WAFL/Westar Rules draw of the 1990s. The previous drawn match was 406 games ago in April 1993 between the Royals and Claremont. Dorotich kicked 8.2 in a superb display, but East Perth rover Shawn Colbin was penalised for holding the ball on the siren within range when it appeared he may have got rid of the ball.

=== Round 17 ===
	Round 17
Saturday, 19 July	West Perth 10.5 (65)	def. by	East Fremantle 23.18 (156)	Arena Joondalup (crowd: 2338)
Saturday, 19 July	Claremont 9.11 (65)	def. by	East Perth 13.13 (91)	Claremont Oval (crowd: 2088)
Saturday, 19 July	South Fremantle 13.10 (88)	def. by	Subiaco 17.9 (111)	Fremantle Oval (crowd: 1841)
Saturday, 19 July	Peel Thunder 11.15 (81)	def. by	Swan Districts 22.17 (149)	Rushton Park (crowd: 2085)
	Bye; Perth

=== Round 18 ===
	Round 18
Saturday, 26 July	Swan Districts 9.9 (63)	def. by	East Fremantle 24.9 (153)	Bassendean Oval (crowd: 1919)
Saturday, 26 July	East Perth 14.10 (94)	def.	Subiaco 8.8 (56)	Perth Oval (crowd: 1952)
Saturday, 26 July	Perth 23.18 (156)	def.	Peel Thunder 8.12 (60)	Lathlain Park (crowd: 1267)
Saturday, 26 July	West Perth 7.15 (57)	def. by	South Fremantle 15.15 (105)	Arena Joondalup (crowd: 1569)
	Bye; Claremont

=== Round 19 ===
	Round 19
Saturday, 2 August	Subiaco 18.9 (117)	def.	West Perth 9.9 (63)	Subiaco Oval (crowd: 1499)
Saturday, 2 August	Swan Districts 11.9 (75)	def. by	Perth 28.10 (178)	Bassendean Oval (crowd: 2418)
Saturday, 2 August	Claremont 22.15 (147)	def.	Peel Thunder 3.17 (35)	Claremont Oval (crowd: 853)
Saturday, 2 August	East Fremantle 14.15 (99)	def.	East Perth 14.6 (90)	East Fremantle Oval (crowd: 2480)
	Bye; South Fremantle
Brett Spinks and Jermaine David kick seven each in a crushing Demon win, whilst Winston Abraham stars in the back pocket.; In the best game of the season to date, East Fremantle take top position with a fine win under great pressure.

=== Round 20 ===
	Round 20
Saturday, 9 August	South Fremantle 13.21 (99)	def.	Claremont 3.11 (29)	Fremantle Oval (crowd: 1153)
Saturday, 9 August	East Perth 14.10 (94)	def.	Swan Districts 4.6 (30)	Perth Oval (crowd: 1523)
Saturday, 9 August	Peel Thunder 6.5 (41)	def. by	West Perth 8.12 (60)	Rushton Park (crowd: 1109)
Sunday, 10 August	Subiaco 10.9 (69)	def. by	Perth 11.23 (89)	Subiaco Oval (crowd: 1675)
	Bye; East Fremantle
Claremont fail to goal after quarter-time for the second time in three seasons; having done so against West Perth in 1995; Crippled by injuries and off-field dissent about who will coach in 1998, Swan Districts kick their lowest score for 29 years; Perth move to top position despite kicking ten behinds without the ball moving out of their attacking fifty-metre arc.

=== Round 21 ===
	Round 21
Saturday, 16 August	East Fremantle 14.13 (97)	def.	Subiaco 13.11 (89)	East Fremantle Oval (crowd: 1554)
Saturday, 16 August	West Perth 12.18 (90)	def.	Claremont 5.14 (44)	Arena Joondalup (crowd: 1551)
Saturday, 16 August	Swan Districts 14.10 (94)	def. by	South Fremantle 18.12 (120)	Bassendean Oval (crowd: 1453)
Saturday, 16 August	Perth 19.19 (133)	def.	Peel Thunder 7.7 (49)	Lathlain Park (crowd: 1437)
	Bye; East Perth
Perth win six consecutive games for the only time since 1977, but lose key forward Brett Spinks to an injury that affects their competitiveness in the following two key matches.

=== Round 22 ===
	Round 22
Saturday, 23 August	Subiaco 18.8 (116)	def.	Swan Districts 14.11 (95)	Subiaco Oval (crowd: 1217)
Saturday, 23 August	East Fremantle 11.18 (84)	def.	Claremont 8.6 (54)	East Fremantle Oval (crowd: 1569)
Saturday, 23 August	East Perth 19.9 (123)	def.	West Perth 11.3 (69)	Perth Oval (crowd: 4709)
Saturday, 23 August	Perth 10.15 (75)	def. by	South Fremantle 15.15 (105)	Lathlain Park (crowd: 3122)
	Bye; Peel Thunder
Dorotich kicks eight goals to reach the century, becoming the oldest player to achieve the feat in WAFL/WANFL/Westar history.; Subiaco's win over Swans seals the top four with West Perth having the last round bye.

=== Round 23 ===
	Round 23
Saturday, 30 August	Peel Thunder 5.17 (47)	def. by	Subiaco 22.23 (155)	Rushton Park (crowd: 1461)
Saturday, 30 August	Claremont 11.11 (77)	def. by	Swan Districts 21.17 (143)	Claremont Oval (crowd: 1304)
Saturday, 30 August	East Perth 18.9 (117)	def.	Perth 9.10 (64)	Perth Oval (crowd: 3708)
Saturday, 30 August (6:30 pm)	South Fremantle 14.6 (90)	def.	East Fremantle 10.14 (74)	Fremantle Oval (crowd: 7688)
	Bye; West Perth
Peel Thunder lose by 100 points or more for the tenth time in their debut season.

== Ladder ==
1997 Westar Rules ladder
Pos	Team	Pld	W	L	D	PF	PA	PP	Pts
1	South Fremantle (P)	20	14	5	1	2144	1549	138.4	58
2	East Fremantle	20	13	7	0	2042	1611	126.8	52
3	Perth	20	13	7	0	1936	1593	121.5	52
4	East Perth	20	12	7	1	1912	1585	120.6	50
5	Swan Districts	20	11	9	0	2113	1870	113.0	44
6	West Perth	20	11	9	0	1801	1694	106.3	44
7	Subiaco	20	9	11	0	1852	1912	96.9	36
8	Claremont	20	5	15	0	1567	1805	86.8	20
9	Peel Thunder	20	1	19	0	1120	2868	39.1	4

Source: "1997 Ladder". WAFL Footy Facts.
Rules for classification: 1) points; 2) percentage; 3) number of points for.
(P) Premiers

== Finals series ==
=== Semi-finals ===
	First semi-final
Saturday, 6 September (11:20 am)	Perth 17.12 (114)	def.	East Perth 6.11 (47)	Subiaco Oval (crowd: 8,918)
The return of centre half-forward Brett Spinks helps Perth reverse their previous loss to East Perth with a crushing victory in windy conditions, led by 100 gamer Toby Jackson.

	Second semi-final
Saturday, 6 September	South Fremantle 7.5 (47)	def. by	East Fremantle 10.12 (72)	Subiaco Oval (crowd: 8,918)
Since the two semi-finals were played at the same venue on the same day, the attendance figure is the same.; Damian Condon demolishes veteran Dorotich in windy conditions to leave East Fremantle little trouble defeating their neighbours, who score just 3.2 (20) after quarter-time.

=== Preliminary final ===
	Preliminary final
Sunday, 14 September	South Fremantle 19.13 (127)	def.	Perth 14.6 (90)	Subiaco Oval (crowd: 7,585)
Clem Michael's ruck dominance allows the strong Bulldog midfield to dominate during an eight-goal second quarter burst that Perth never counter.

=== Grand Final ===
1997 Westar Rules Grand Final
Saturday, 19 September	East Fremantle	def. by	South Fremantle	Subiaco Oval (crowd: 32,371)
5.4 (34); 8.6 (54); 10.10 (70); 11.13 (79)	Q1; Q2; Q3; Final	3.1 (19); 6.2 (38); 8.5 (53); 13.7 (85)	Umpires: Trevor Garrett, Adam Binks, Wayne French; Simpson Medal: David Hynes (South Fremantle)
O'Brien 3, Dodd 2, Mellody 2, Willison, Bromage, Stockden Bilcich	Goals	Rioli 4, Hart 2, Campbell 2, Dorotich, Bootsma, Pears, Worsfold, Johnson
Bromage, Condon, Mellody, Kilmartin, Roser, Dodd	Best	Hynes, Porter, Michael, Hart, Rioli, Pears, Black
Injuries	Peter Sumich (thigh)
Scott Spalding for striking Jess Sinclair (SF)	Reports
