= 1998 Westar Rules season =

1998 premiership season
- Teams: 9
- Premiers: East Fremantle; 29th premiership
- Minor premiers: East Fremantle; 32nd minor premiership
- Sandover Medallist: Adrian Bromage (East Fremantle)
- Leading goalkicker: Todd Ridley (Subiaco)
- Matches played: 94

The 1998 Westar Rules season was the second season of "Westar Rules" and the 114th season of the various incarnations of senior football in Perth. The season opened on 29 March and concluded on 20 September with the 1998 Westar Rules Grand Final contested between East Fremantle and West Perth.

The Sandover Medal was awarded to Adrian Bromage (East Fremantle). Todd Ridley (Subiaco) won the Bernie Naylor Medal for kicking the most goals during the home-and-away rounds.

East Fremantle achieved its best record since its perfect season of 1946, winning all except its fourth and fifth games and achieving an unbeaten run of sixteen games rivalled since the perfect season only by Claremont in 1987 who was unbeaten for twenty-one games after having won the Grand Final.

== Home-and-away season ==
=== Round 1 ===
	Round 1
Saturday, 28 March	Claremont 9.14 (68)	def. by	Subiaco 19.13 (127)	Claremont Oval (crowd: 1231)
Saturday, 28 March	East Fremantle 19.9 (123)	def.	South Fremantle 9.6 (60)	East Fremantle Oval (crowd: 2439)
Saturday, 28 March	Swan Districts 22.10 (142)	def.	Peel Thunder 12.8 (80)	Bassendean Oval (crowd: 1445)
Saturday, 28 March	West Perth 13.17 (95)	def.	East Perth 9.7 (61)	Arena Joondalup (crowd: 2498)
	Bye; Perth
Childhood East Fremantle fan Greg Egan finally joins the Sharks from Perth and becomes part of a dominant big-man division that the Bulldogs never threaten.

=== Round 2 ===
	Round 2
Saturday, 4 April	Perth 6.8 (44)	def. by	East Fremantle 10.19 (79)	Lathlain Park (crowd: 1780)
Saturday, 4 April (6:20 pm)	Peel Thunder 8.5 (53)	def. by	West Perth 22.15 (147)	Rushton Park (crowd: 1678)
Saturday, 4 April (6:20 pm)	South Fremantle 8.6 (54)	def. by	Swan Districts 14.18 (102)	Fremantle Oval (crowd: 2028)
Sunday, 5 April	Subiaco 9.7 (61)	def. by	East Perth 18.12 (120)	Subiaco Oval (crowd: 1978)
	Bye; Claremont
East Fremantle take advantage of Fremantle's discarding of former Hawthorn regular Greg Madigan as he leads the Sharks to victory on an oppressive 35 °C (95 °F) day

=== Round 3 ===
	Round 3
Saturday, 11 April	East Fremantle 25.14 (164)	def.	Peel Thunder 7.1 (43)	East Fremantle Oval (crowd: 1337)
Saturday, 11 April	West Perth 14.11 (95)	def.	Claremont 6.6 (42)	Arena Joondalup (crowd: 2342)
Monday, 13 April	Swan Districts 14.12 (96)	def.	East Perth 10.12 (72)	Bassendean Oval (crowd: 3536)
Monday, 13 April	Perth 12.7 (79)	def. by	South Fremantle 16.16 (112)	Lathlain Park (crowd: 2148)
	Bye; Subiaco

=== Round 4 ===
	Round 4
Saturday, 18 April	Peel Thunder 11.8 (74)	def. by	Perth 11.17 (83)	Rushton Park (crowd: 1175)
Saturday, 18 April	Claremont 15.20 (110)	def.	Swan Districts 8.11 (59)	Claremont Oval (crowd: 1336)
Saturday, 18 April	Subiaco 6.12 (48)	def. by	West Perth 10.15 (75)	Subiaco Oval (crowd: 2138)
Saturday, 18 April	East Perth 8.6 (54)	def. by	East Fremantle 24.7 (151)	Perth Oval (crowd: 1887)
	Bye; South Fremantle
Wayne Blackwell's innovative use of the interchange bench – whereby he drags key players Toby Jackson and Drew Cornelius only for them to come back to decisive effect – helps Perth win its first game.

=== Round 5 ===
	Round 5
Saturday, 25 April	Swan Districts 15.12 (102)	def. by	Subiaco 17.9 (111)	Bassendean Oval (crowd: 1566)
Sunday, 26 April	Claremont 10.14 (74)	def.	East Fremantle 7.14 (56)	Claremont Oval (crowd: 1574)
Sunday, 26 April	South Fremantle 22.16 (148)	def.	Peel Thunder 12.6 (78)	Fremantle Oval (crowd: 1749)
Monday, 27 April	East Perth 9.13 (67)	def.	Perth 9.9 (63)	Perth Oval (crowd: 2633)
	Bye; West Perth
After playing a few games in defence, Bulldog Peter Sumich is returned to attack and kick eight in his best performance in Westar Rules.; East Fremantle list centre half-forward Damian Condon for their game with Claremont even though it was widely known he had no hope of playing and was replaced before the match

=== Round 6 ===
	Round 6
Saturday, 2 May	East Fremantle 9.16 (70)	def. by	Subiaco 17.7 (109)	East Fremantle Oval (crowd: 1708)
Saturday, 2 May	Perth 14.9 (93)	def. by	Claremont 14.19 (103)	Lathlain Park (crowd: 1589)
Saturday, 2 May	East Perth 12.16 (88)	def.	South Fremantle 8.9 (57)	Perth Oval (crowd: 1838)
Saturday, 2 May	West Perth 22.13 (145)	def.	Swan Districts 7.5 (47)	Arena Joondalup (crowd: 2441)
	Bye; Peel Thunder
East Fremantle's tall forward line of Earl Spalding, Damian Condon, Brendon Feddema and Leigh Willison is rendered ineffective by a lack of crumbing players. The match remains Subiaco's biggest win with fewer scoring shots.

=== Round 7 ===
	Round 7
Saturday, 9 May	Peel Thunder 6.15 (51)	def. by	East Perth 18.20 (128)	Rushton Park (crowd: 1345)
Saturday, 9 May	Claremont 11.18 (84)	def.	South Fremantle 12.9 (81)	Claremont Oval (crowd: 1203)
Saturday, 9 May	Subiaco 18.6 (114)	def.	Perth 8.9 (57)	Subiaco Oval (crowd: 1335)
Saturday, 9 May	East Fremantle 13.12 (90)	def.	West Perth 11.6 (72)	East Fremantle Oval (crowd: 2056)
	Bye; Swan Districts
Nineteen-year-old Clint Kirey solves the Sharks' problems of a crumbing forward as they down the previously unbeaten Falcons.

=== Round 8 ===
	Round 8
Saturday, 16 May	Peel Thunder 13.6 (84)	def. by	Claremont 14.20 (104)	Rushton Park (crowd: 1010)
Saturday, 16 May	Perth 13.10 (88)	def. by	West Perth 13.17 (95)	Lathlain Park (crowd: 1867)
Saturday, 16 May	South Fremantle 16.20 (116)	def.	Subiaco 10.12 (72)	Fremantle Oval (crowd: 1876)
Saturday, 16 May	Swan Districts 9.12 (66)	def. by	East Fremantle 19.14 (128)	Bassendean Oval (crowd: 1882)
	Bye; East Perth
With former Carlton star Earl Spalding back in his home state and kicking seven goals, East Fremantle send Swans to a fourth straight defeat after starting in promising fashion.

=== Round 9 ===
	Round 9
Saturday, 23 May	Subiaco 16.17 (113)	def.	Peel Thunder 10.7 (67)	Subiaco Oval (crowd: 1142)
Saturday, 23 May	Perth 14.9 (93)	def.	Swan Districts 9.11 (65)	Lathlain Park (crowd: 1752)
Saturday, 23 May	East Perth 11.13 (79)	def.	Claremont 11.8 (74)	Perth Oval (crowd: 1935)
Saturday, 23 May	West Perth 13.13 (91)	def.	South Fremantle 8.5 (53)	Arena Joondalup (crowd: 2304)
	Bye; East Fremantle

=== Round 10 ===
	Round 10
Saturday, 30 May	Peel Thunder 12.6 (78)	def. by	Swan Districts 21.9 (135)	Rushton Park (crowd: 1332)
Saturday, 30 May	Claremont 9.9 (63)	def. by	Subiaco 13.16 (94)	Claremont Oval (crowd: 1622)
Monday, 1 June	East Perth 16.8 (104)	def.	West Perth 8.10 (58)	Perth Oval (crowd: 4853)
Monday, 1 June	South Fremantle 14.7 (91)	def. by	East Fremantle 22.9 (141)	Fremantle Oval (crowd: 7806)
	Bye; Perth
East Perth honour the late Jeremy Silcock, who died on a 1995 end-of-season trip, with a superb win over their traditional rivals. The Royals win with an eight-goal second quarter to one point by the Falcons.; East Fremantle take top spot (which they will retain without losing for the rest of the year) with a fine win in a fluctuating derby.

=== Round 11 ===
	Round 11
Saturday, 6 June	East Fremantle 16.16 (112)	def.	Perth 5.8 (38)	East Fremantle Oval (crowd: 1758)
Saturday, 6 June	East Perth 11.16 (82)	def.	Subiaco 10.10 (70)	Perth Oval (crowd: 2257)
Saturday, 6 June	Swan Districts 13.11 (89)	def. by	South Fremantle 18.15 (123)	Bassendean Oval (crowd: 1615)
Saturday, 6 June	West Perth 28.22 (190)	def.	Peel Thunder 6.10 (46)	Arena Joondalup (crowd: 1572)
	Bye; Claremont
Future Eagles star David Wirrpanda lives up to expectations three years after being recruited from Healesville with a brilliant display for East Perth.; After the resignation of foundation coach Geoff Miles, Peel go from bad (if improving) to worse with their thrashing at Joondalup.

=== Round 12 ===
	Round 12
Saturday, 13 June	Subiaco 21.10 (136)	def.	Peel Thunder 12.9 (81)	Subiaco Oval (crowd: 1055)
Saturday, 13 June	Perth 8.18 (66)	def. by	East Perth 13.5 (83)	Lathlain Park (crowd: 2012)
Saturday, 13 June	South Fremantle 15.12 (102)	def. by	Claremont 16.14 (110)	Fremantle Oval (crowd: 1386)
	Bye; East Fremantle, West Perth, Swan Districts
Claremont consolidate their finals chances but lose skipper Jeremy Guard for the rest of the season.; East Perth maintain their winning streak despite Perth dominating the game, due to the Demons' inaccuracy in front of goal

=== Round 13 ===
	Round 13
Saturday, 20 June	Peel Thunder 10.10 (70)	def. by	East Fremantle 17.19 (121)	Rushton Park (crowd: 1175)
Saturday, 20 June	Claremont 7.4 (46)	def. by	West Perth 13.13 (91)	Claremont Oval (crowd: 1737)
Saturday, 20 June	East Perth 12.12 (84)	def.	Swan Districts 6.14 (50)	Perth Oval (crowd: 2856)
Saturday, 20 June	South Fremantle 15.13 (103)	def.	Perth 8.16 (64)	Fremantle Oval (crowd: 1363)
	Bye; Subiaco

=== Round 14 ===
	Round 14
Saturday, 27 June	Perth 13.17 (95)	def.	Peel Thunder 9.7 (61)	Lathlain Park (crowd: 1116)
Saturday, 27 June	East Fremantle 13.10 (88)	def.	East Perth 7.15 (57)	East Fremantle Oval (crowd: 2126)
Saturday, 27 June	Swan Districts 7.5 (47)	def. by	Claremont 9.10 (64)	Bassendean Oval (crowd: 1322)
Saturday, 27 June	West Perth 8.13 (61)	def.	Subiaco 9.5 (59)	Arena Joondalup (crowd: 1666)
	Bye; South Fremantle
The game at Arena Joondalup was the last senior Westar/WAFL game where a team scoring fewer goals won until Easter Monday of 2004 when South Fremantle beat Swan Districts thus.; East Fremantle end East Perth's eight-match winning streak with Victorian Martin Mellody dominant. The Royals are handicapped by driving rain during the second quarter when they have a gale force wind.

=== Round 15 ===
	Round 15
Saturday, 4 July	Peel Thunder 6.11 (47)	def. by	South Fremantle 6.24 (60)	Rushton Park (crowd: 822)
Saturday, 4 July	Subiaco 9.11 (65)	def.	Swan Districts 9.9 (63)	Subiaco Oval (crowd: 1081)
Saturday, 4 July	East Fremantle 10.6 (66)	def.	Claremont 8.12 (60)	East Fremantle Oval (crowd: 1084)
Saturday, 4 July	Perth 7.11 (53)	def. by	East Perth 14.12 (96)	Lathlain Park (crowd: 1487)
	Bye; West Perth
South Fremantle kick an extraordinary 4.24 (48) after quarter-time in violent winds and rain. With Scott Simister kicking four goals in the third quarter, Peel are poised for a monumental upset but the Bulldogs kick 2.10 (22) to 0.2 (2) in the last and keep their finals hopes alive.; East Fremantle kick nine straight goals with a violent southwesterly wind in the first quarter to set up a winning break in heavy rain. During the second half as the wind changes direction, only two goals are kicked as both teams flood their backline when against the hurricane.

=== Round 16 ===
	Round 16
Sunday, 12 July	Claremont 19.12 (126)	def.	Perth 8.16 (64)	Claremont Oval (crowd: 1242)
Sunday, 12 July	Subiaco 6.6 (42)	def. by	East Fremantle 21.17 (143)	Subiaco Oval (crowd: 1682)
Sunday, 12 July	South Fremantle 10.19 (79)	def.	East Perth 8.13 (61)	Fremantle Oval (crowd: 2178)
Sunday, 12 July	Swan Districts 18.9 (117)	def.	West Perth 16.14 (110)	Bassendean Oval (crowd: 2021)
	Bye; Peel Thunder
Despite losing seven players to a State game in Adelaide, East Fremantle thrash Subiaco to jeopardise the Lions' place in the top four.; South Fremantle kick twelve straight behinds between late in the first quarter and early in the third, but come back to defeat the Royals. The win puts the Bulldogs within a game of fourth spot.

=== Round 17 ===
	Round 17
Saturday, 18 July	Perth 14.14 (98)	def.	Subiaco 12.15 (87)	Jubilee Park, Northam (crowd: 1564)
Saturday, 18 July	East Perth 10.6 (66)	def. by	Peel Thunder 11.13 (79)	Perth Oval (crowd: 1185)
Saturday, 18 July	South Fremantle 14.17 (101)	def. by	Claremont 16.9 (105)	Fremantle Oval (crowd: 1199)
Saturday, 18 July	West Perth 9.12 (66)	def. by	East Fremantle 16.11 (107)	Arena Joondalup (crowd: 1773)
	Bye; Swan Districts
Two enormous upsets unsettle the battle for fourth position and see Claremont, second last in 1997, climb therein.; Scott Simister kicks six for the Thunder as they win their second Westar Rules match.

=== Round 18 ===
	Round 18
Saturday, 25 July	Claremont 10.12 (72)	def.	Peel Thunder 5.5 (35)	Claremont Oval (crowd: 944)
Saturday, 25 July	Subiaco 5.12 (42)	def. by	South Fremantle 12.15 (87)	Subiaco Oval (crowd: 996)
Saturday, 25 July	East Fremantle 14.14 (98)	def.	Swan Districts 5.9 (39)	East Fremantle Oval (crowd: 1453)
Saturday, 25 July	West Perth 6.9 (45)	def.	Perth 3.3 (21)	Arena Joondalup (crowd: 1137)
	Bye; East Perth
Perth do not score between the twelve-minute mark of the opening quarter and the nine-minute mark of the last, becoming the first senior WANFL/WAFL/WASFL/Westar team to fail to score in the second and third quarters since East Fremantle at Lathlain Park in 1967.; South Fremantle, one point ahead at half-time, overcome the treacherous conditions with long kicking and the move of Marty Atkins to the ruck and Stephen Pears to a forward pocket, kicking 8.11 (59) to 2.3 (15) by the Lions.

=== Round 19 ===
	Round 19
Saturday, 1 August	Peel Thunder 8.19 (67)	def. by	Subiaco 16.13 (109)	Rushton Park (crowd: 1115)
Saturday, 1 August	Claremont 12.7 (79)	def. by	East Perth 12.10 (82)	Claremont Oval (crowd: 1557)
Saturday, 1 August	South Fremantle 8.7 (55)	def. by	West Perth 17.18 (120)	Fremantle Oval (crowd: 1498)
Saturday, 1 August	Swan Districts 17.6 (108)	def.	Perth 10.20 (80)	Bassendean Oval (crowd: 1333)
	Bye; East Fremantle
West Perth eliminate the reigning premiers' finals chances with a superb win in wet and windy conditions due to Troy Wilson's four goals and fine marking.

=== Round 20 ===
	Round 20
Saturday, 8 August	Peel Thunder 11.7 (73)	def. by	West Perth 21.17 (143)	Rushton Park (crowd: 1418)
Saturday, 8 August	Perth 11.5 (71)	def. by	East Fremantle 20.8 (128)	Lathlain Park (crowd: 2186)
Saturday, 8 August	East Perth 11.10 (76)	def. by	Subiaco 16.7 (103)	Perth Oval (crowd: 2688)
Saturday, 8 August	Swan Districts 15.9 (99)	def.	South Fremantle 14.12 (96)	Bassendean Oval (crowd: 2236)
	Bye; Claremont

=== Round 21 ===
	Round 21
Saturday, 15 August	Subiaco 27.13 (175)	def.	Swan Districts 8.11 (59)	Subiaco Oval (crowd: 1389)
Saturday, 15 August	East Fremantle 16.18 (114)	def.	Claremont 6.8 (44)	East Fremantle Oval (crowd: 2392)
Saturday, 15 August	West Perth 32.11 (203)	def.	Perth 6.6 (42)	Arena Joondalup (crowd: 1896)
	Bye; East Perth, Peel Thunder, South Fremantle
West Perth record their biggest ever win over Perth.; Subiaco record their biggest ever win over Swan Districts, with Kenwick recruit Daniel Hardington destroying Swans' highly touted Garth Taylor. Leading goalkicker Todd Ridley kicks nine.

=== Round 22 ===
	Round 22
Saturday, 22 August	Subiaco 10.10 (70)	def. by	Claremont 16.13 (109)	Subiaco Oval (crowd: 1487)
Saturday, 22 August	East Fremantle 17.17 (119)	def.	South Fremantle 12.9 (81)	East Fremantle Oval (crowd: 3534)
Saturday, 22 August	Swan Districts 17.16 (118)	def.	Peel Thunder 10.5 (65)	Bassendean Oval (crowd: 1354)
Saturday, 22 August	West Perth 18.11 (119)	def.	East Perth 5.8 (38)	Arena Joondalup (crowd: 3065)
	Bye; Perth

=== Round 23 ===
	Round 23
Friday, 28 August (7:30 pm)	South Fremantle 17.19 (121)	def.	Perth 8.17 (65)	Fremantle Oval (crowd: 1135)
Saturday, 29 August	Peel Thunder 7.6 (48)	def. by	East Fremantle 15.12 (102)	Rushton Park (crowd: 1065)
Saturday, 29 August	Claremont 10.10 (70)	def. by	West Perth 13.10 (88)	Claremont Oval (crowd: 1355)
Saturday, 29 August	East Perth 3.11 (29)	def. by	Swan Districts 6.8 (44)	Perth Oval (crowd: 2083)
	Bye; Subiaco
Swan Districts kicked their lowest-ever winning score, beating a 1952 record by three points.; East Fremantle kicks seven goals in eleven minutes during the second quarter to win its fourteenth straight game against the Thunder. Only one goal, by the Thunder in the last quarter, is kicked against a strong and wet northwesterly wind.; West Perth's three late goals forces Claremont into a last-minute exit from the final four.

== Ladder ==
1998 Westar Rules ladder
Pos	Team	Pld	W	L	D	PF	PA	PP	Pts
1	East Fremantle (P)	20	18	2	0	2200	1229	179.0	72
2	West Perth	20	16	4	0	2109	1260	167.4	64
3	Subiaco	20	11	9	0	1807	1664	108.6	44
4	East Perth	20	11	9	0	1527	1536	99.4	44
5	Claremont	20	11	9	0	1607	1628	98.7	44
6	South Fremantle	20	9	11	0	1780	1779	100.1	36
7	Swan Districts	20	9	11	0	1647	1860	88.5	36
8	Perth	20	4	16	0	1357	1982	68.5	16
9	Peel Thunder	20	1	19	0	1280	2376	53.9	4

Rules for classification: 1) points; 2) percentage; 3) number of points for.
(P) Premiers

== Finals series ==
=== Semi-finals ===
	First semi-final
Saturday, 5 September	Subiaco 13.13 (91)	def.	East Perth 9.15 (69)	Subiaco Oval (crowd: 7,387)

	Second semi-final
Saturday, 5 September	East Fremantle 13.10 (88)	def.	West Perth 3.17 (35)	Subiaco Oval (crowd: -)
Since the two semi-finals were played at the same venue on the same day, the attendance figure is the same for both.; East Fremantle's brigade of tall forwards and their superb defence, with Greg Madigan keeping Troy Wilson scoreless, demolished the Falcons on a perfectly fine day.

=== Preliminary final ===
	Preliminary final
Sunday, 13 September	West Perth 13.8 (86)	def.	Subiaco 12.11 (83)	Subiaco Oval (crowd: 5,648)
A brilliant solo goal after a zigzagging run from Neil Mildenhall and a perfectly executed shepherd allow West Perth, behind from early in the second quarter and twenty-eight points down halfway through the third, to obtain a rematch with East Fremantle.

=== Grand Final ===
	Grand Final
Sunday, 20 September	East Fremantle 20.10 (130)	def.	West Perth 13.9 (87)	Subiaco Oval (crowd: 23,258)
