= Warren Campbell =

Australian rules footballer

Personal information
- Full name: Warren Campbell
- Born: 19 October 1974 (age 52); Darwin, Northern Territory
- Original team: St Mary's (NTFL)/South Fremantle (WAFL)
- Draft: No. 23, 1992 AFL draft
- Position: Forward

Playing career^{1}
Years	Club	Games (Goals)
1994–1995	North Melbourne	19 (17)
- ^{1} Playing statistics correct to the end of 1995.

Warren Campbell (born 19 October 1974) is a former Australian rules footballer for North Melbourne in the Australian Football League (AFL), South Fremantle in the West Australian Football League (WAFL) and St Mary's in the Northern Territory Football League (NTFL).

== Football career ==
Originally from Darwin, Northern Territory, he played for the St Mary's Football Club in the Northern Territory Football League (NTFL) before moving to Perth to play for South Fremantle Football Club in the West Australian Football League (WAFL) in 1992 and 1993. He was recruited to North Melbourne with the 23rd selection in the 1992 AFL draft.

Campbell remained in WA for the 1993 season and made his debut for North Melbourne against Melbourne in Round 7 of the 1994 AFL season. He kicked 13 goals in his first 7 games, but was then goalless for the remaining 4 games that he played in 1994. In 1995 he only played eight games for 4 goals and was delisted at the end of 1996 without playing a senior game in North Melbourne's premiership winning season.

He returned to South Fremantle for the 1997 season where he played in South Fremantle's premiership winning team, where he kicked a goal after receiving a 50-metre penalty in the final minutes of the game. The goal gave South the lead, which they were able to maintain until the end of the match.

Campbell coached the West Alice Springs Football Club to a Central Australian Football League (CAFL) premiership in 2005 before returning to Darwin to coached St Marys in the 2006/2007 season.

He is the son of Basil Campbell who also played for St Marys and South Fremantle in the 1970s and 1980s. Three players from South Fremantle's 1997 premiership team were related to members of South's previous premiership in 1980; Clem Michael is the son of Stephen Michael and Dean Rioli is the nephew of Maurice Rioli.
