= Delmenico =

Delmenico is an Italian surname. Notable people with the surname include:

- Kevin Delmenico (born 1945), Australian footballer
- Wayne Delmenico (born 1952), Australian footballer

== See also ==
- Delmonico steak
