= Derek Shaw =

Derek Shaw may refer to:

- Derek Shaw (businessman), English businessman, former chairman of English football club Preston North End
- Derek Shaw (footballer) (born 1959), former Australian rules footballer
