= 1980 WAFL Grand Final =

Australian rules football game

South Fremantle	Swan Districts
23.18 (156)	15.8 (98)
- Date: 27 September 1980
- Stadium: Subiaco Oval
- Attendance: 46,208

Accolades
- Simpson Medallist: Maurice Rioli (South Fremantle)

The 1980 WAFL Grand Final was an Australian rules football game contested between the South Fremantle Football Club and the Swan Districts Football Club, on 27 September 1980 at Subiaco Oval, to determine the premier team of the West Australian Football League (WAFL) for the 1980 season. South Fremantle won the game by 58 points, 23.18 (156) to 15.8 (98), with Maurice Rioli of South Fremantle winning the Simpson Medal as best on ground.

== Season summary ==
Swan Districts were the dominant team in the first half of the season, winning 13 games straight. Their winning run ended in Round 14 when they lost to South Fremantle at their home ground, Bassendean Oval by 19 points. They would only lose two more home and away season games for the year, to East Perth in round 16 and to South Fremantle in the final round.

South Fremantle's season started with player turmoil, with Collingwood's ruckman Derek Shaw getting a Supreme Court injunction to enable him to play for South Fremantle without a clearance. However, South's centre half-back Joe McKay failed in his Supreme Court bid to be cleared to East Perth. Stephen Michael was also enticed to move to Geelong but rejected their offer. After a loss to East Perth in round 6, coach Mal Brown resigned due to his perception that his personality was affecting the umpiring and the "unreceptive attitude of the players to my advice". He withdrew his resignation the following week. South would lose that week to Swan Districts, but would then only lose one more game for the year, winning 12 in a row to finish the regular season in second place, one game behind Swans.

In the finals, East Perth beat Claremont in the First Semi Final with Paul Arnold kicking 7 goals. The following week in the Second Semi Final, South Fremantle continued their unbeaten streak, beating Swans by 10 points. Swan Districts bounced back in the preliminary final, kicking a finals record 28 goals to beat East Perth by 76 points. Graham Melrose starred with 9 goals and Simon Beasley kicked 7 goals.

The main individual awards were dominated by South Fremantle's captain Noel Carter, who won most of the media awards and Stephen Michael, who won the Sandover Medal with 24 votes, 5 votes ahead of Carter. Warren Ralph won the best first year player award and the goalkicking award with 87 goals for the season, the first debutant to win since Austin Robertson, Jr. in 1962. Billy Duckworth won the best rookie award.

== Grand final ==
South Fremantle won the toss and kicked into the light wind in the first quarter. Swans started well, kicking the first two goals of the match before South kicked the three goals to go to quarter time with a 10-point lead. However, in the second quarter, South Fremantle dominated, kicking eight goals to one, to lead by 54 points at half time. Swans never recovered, and despite kicking 6 goals in the final 10 minutes, lost by 58 points. Maurice Rioli was awarded the Simpson Medal as the best player on the ground.

It was South Fremantle's tenth premiership, ten years after their previous win.

== Match ==
1980 WAFL Grand Final
Saturday, 27 September 1980, 2:10pm	South Fremantle	def.	Swan Districts	Subiaco Oval (crowd: 46,208)	Report
3.6 (24); 11.13 (79); 17.16 (118); 23.18 (156)	Q1; Q2; Q3; Final	2.2 (14); 3.7 (25); 8.7 (55); 15.8 (98)	Umpires: J Morris, R Phillips; Simpson Medal: Maurice Rioli
Carter 4 Hardie, Outhwaite 3 Morley, Shaw, Michael, Rioli, Vigona 2 O'Brien, Campbell, Delmenico 1	Goals	3 Richardson; 2 Neesham, Hoyer, Solin, Beasley, Holmes; 1 Holden, P. Narkle
Rioli, Carter, McKay, Michael, Vigona, Delmenico	Best	Neesham, Boucher, Skwirowski, Gillespie, Solin, Richardson

=== Teams ===
1980 South Fremantle Premiership Team
B:	Rod Barrett	Tony Kelly	Ross Sweetman
HB:	Kevin Cornell	Joe McKay	Phil Cronan
C:	Jamie Lockyer	Maurice Rioli	Benny Vigona
HF:	Basil Campbell	Wayne Delmenico	Tony Morley
F:	Derek Shaw	Don Haddow	Geoff O'Brien
Foll:	Stephen Michael	Paul Vasoli	Noel Carter
Int:	Simon Outhwaite	Brad Hardie	
Coach:	Mal Brown		

1980 Swan Districts Grand Final Team
B:	Bill Skwirowski	Tom Mullooly	Steve Gillespie
HB:	Jon Fogarty	Ross Fitzgerald	Anthony Solin
C:	Phil Narkle	Mike Smith	Keith Narkle
HF:	Graham Melrose	Don Langsford	Mike Richardson
F:	Don Holmes	Simon Beasley	Craig Hoyer
Foll:	Ron Boucher	Craig Holden	Gerard Neesham
Int:	Allan Sidebottom	Gordon Casey	
Coach:	John Todd		
