= Basil Campbell =

Personal information
- Full name: Basil Gerard Campbell
- Born: 2 August 1956 (age 70)

Playing career^{1}
Years	Club	Games (Goals)
1975–1981	South Fremantle	102 (122)
- ^{1} Playing statistics correct to the end of 1981.

Basil Gerard Campbell (born 2 August 1956) is a former Australian rules football player of indigenous background who played for the St Mary's Football Club in the Northern Territory Football League (NTFL) and South Fremantle Football Club in the West Australian Football League (WAFL) during the mid-late 1970s and early 1980s.

Described as an aggressive and all-action type of player who was solidly built, he joined South Fremantle in 1975 where he generally played at centre half forward. Campbell was an instantly recognizable figure on the field wearing his protective helmet worn as a result of a head injury he suffered early in his career.

In 1977 Campbell represented Western Australia in the first State of Origin match where he played on a half back flank. The team defeated Victoria by 94 points.

Campbell was a member of the South Fremantle 1980 WAFL Grand Final side that defeated Swan Districts. His son, Warren later played for St Mary's, South Fremantle (including in the 1997 WAFL Grand Final winning side) and North Melbourne in the Australian Football League.
