= Noel Carter =

Australian rules footballer

Personal information
- Full name: Noel William Carter
- Born: 9 February 1955 (age 71)
- Original team: Ulverstone
- Height: 177 cm (5 ft 10 in)
- Weight: 75 kg (165 lb)
- Position: Rover

Playing career^{1}
Years	Club	Games (Goals)
	Ulverstone	44 (?)
1973–1977	Richmond	50 (55)
1978–1985	South Fremantle	155 (317)

Representative team honours
Years	Team	Games (Goals)
	Tasmania	7
1981	WA	2 (5)
- ^{1} Playing statistics correct to the end of 1985.

Career highlights
- Ulverstone Football Club best and fairest: 1972; Richmond premiership player: 1973; South Fremantle premiership captain: 1980; South Fremantle Football Club best and fairest: 1980, 1984; South Fremantle Football Club Hall of Fame

Noel Carter (born 9 February 1955) is a former Australian rules football player who played in the Victorian Football League (VFL) between 1973 and 1977 for the Richmond Football Club. He also played 155 games in the West Australian Football League (WAFL) for the South Fremantle Football Club between 1978 and 1985.

At age 17 he was recruited by Richmond from Ulverstone Football Club in the North West Football Union, where he had won their best and fairest award in 1972. He played five senior games for Richmond in his debut season, including the preliminary and grand final, being a member of the 1973 VFL Grand Final winning team.

After 50 games over 5 seasons for Richmond, Carter moved to South Fremantle in 1978, being named captain from 1979 to 1982. After losing the 1979 WAFL Grand Final to East Fremantle, he was victorious in the 1980 WAFL premiership, in a year when he also led the team's goalkicking and won the club's best and fairest, an award he won again in 1984. He captained the Western Australian state side in 1981 and captained South Fremantle again in 1985. In total he played nine state games for WA and Tasmania.

He was awarded life membership of the South Fremantle Football Club in 1985. He was inducted into the South Fremantle Football Club Hall of Fame in 2011.
