= 1996 WAFL season =

Australian rules football season

- Teams: 8
- Premiers: Claremont; 10th premiership
- Minor premiers: East Perth; 15th minor premiership
- Sandover Medallist: Jeremy Wasley (Swan Districts)
- Bernie Naylor Medallist: John Dorotich (South Fremantle)
- Matches played: 88

The 1996 WAFL season was the 112th season of the West Australian Football League in its various incarnations.

It saw the league at a crisis point with attendances decimated by the rise of the Eagles and newly formed Dockers of the AFL. With serious financial problems for a number of clubs, especially Perth and Swan Districts but also Claremont, East Perth and West Perth, the league intensely debated whether to expand or contract the competition. The upshot was that 1996 would prove the final year of the eight-club competition that had been established with the admission of Swan Districts in 1934.

On the field, 1996 was notable for the decline of 1995 minor premiers Subiaco, who with the decline of top goalkicker Jason Heatley and the loss of other key players to the AFL, declined by thirteen wins, the largest in WAFL history since Claremont after the loss of Graham Moss to Essendon fell from only three losses in 1972 to only four wins in 1973. In the process, the Lions suffered a number of spectacular losses. In contrast, East Perth, after eleven years in the doldrums when they had won only eighty and drawn one of 236 games, rose under the coaching of former Collingwood defender Kevin Worthington to their first minor premiership since 1976 and despite lack of experience, nearly beat Claremont in a thrilling Grand Final. The Tigers, despite being fifth in 1995, won the Emu Export Cup to be early premiership favourites with the power of their lower grades, and despite some lapses ultimately lived up to that label.

The wettest Perth winter since 1974 led to some notable low scoring, with Claremont kicking the second lowest score by an eventual premier team in a major Australian Rules league against Swan Districts and West Perth kicking three or fewer goals in successive games for the first time in 69 open-age seasons.

== Home-and-away season ==
=== Round 1 (Easter weekend) ===
	Round 1
Saturday, 6 April	South Fremantle 19.19 (133)	def.	West Perth 15.14 (104)	Fremantle Oval (crowd: 2468)
Saturday, 6 April	Swan Districts 19.14 (128)	def.	East Fremantle 11.13 (79)	Bassendean Oval (crowd: 1968)
Monday, 8 April	Perth 11.12 (78)	def. by	Claremont 26.10 (166)	Lathlain Park (crowd: 2318)
Monday, 8 April	Subiaco 15.6 (96)	def.	East Perth 13.12 (90)	Subiaco Oval (crowd: 2767)
Swan Districts recover from a terrible first eight minutes where East Fremantle kick four unanswered goals to completely dominate the rest of the game, led by unheralded ruckman Ron Skender against the strong Shark rucks.

=== Round 2 ===
	Round 2
Saturday, 13 April	East Perth 13.14 (92)	def.	Swan Districts 12.12 (84)	Perth Oval (crowd: 3406)
Saturday, 13 April	Claremont 17.8 (110)	def.	Subiaco 9.6 (60)	Claremont Oval (crowd: 1948)
Saturday, 13 April	West Perth 12.17 (89)	def.	Perth 7.11 (53)	Arena Joondalup (crowd: 2275)	.
Saturday, 13 April	East Fremantle 17.14 (116)	def.	South Fremantle 17.10 (112)	East Fremantle Oval (crowd: 3027)
A brilliant goal almost on the siren by future Eagle champion Ben Cousins sees East Fremantle win a thriller after the Bulldogs appeared likely to steal the game via four goals in three minutes.

=== Round 3 ===
	Round 3
Saturday, 20 April	Perth 16.15 (111)	def.	East Fremantle 10.10 (70)	Lathlain Park (crowd: 1499)
Saturday, 20 April	Swan Districts 20.14 (134)	def.	Subiaco 11.12 (78)	Bassendean Oval (crowd: 1920)
Saturday, 20 April	Claremont 13.11 (89)	def.	West Perth 7.15 (57)	Claremont Oval (crowd: 1922)
Saturday, 20 April (6:45 pm)	South Fremantle 11.11 (77)	def.	East Perth 11.7 (73)	Fremantle Oval (crowd: 2393)
South Fremantle win with a goal by Marty Atkins with 23 seconds remaining to complete the Royals' third consecutive fade-out after a strong start – the Royals were sixteen points ahead eighteen minutes into the last quarter and kicking with a strong wind.; Perth half-forward Joe Proctor returns after five seasons of repeated foot fractures to kick six goals and beat four opponents in a major upset over a Shark team that lacked its normal commitment at the ball.

=== Round 4 (Anzac Day) ===
	Round 4
Thursday, 25 April	East Fremantle 13.10 (88)	def.	West Perth 12.10 (82)	East Fremantle Oval (crowd: 3822)
Saturday, 27 April	Swan Districts 12.18 (90)	def. by	Claremont 17.14 (116)	Rushton Park, Mandurah (crowd: 1979)
Sunday, 28 April	East Perth 22.10 (142)	def.	Perth 7.5 (47)	Perth Oval (crowd: 1990)
Sunday, 28 April	Subiaco 12.17 (89)	def.	South Fremantle 11.18 (84)	Subiaco Oval (crowd: 1711)
Despite a major concussion, former Claremont full-forward Chris Gerreyn scores eleven goals to confirm East Perth are back as a force.; The game between East Fremantle and West Perth sees the smallest total of margins at each change since Round 3 of 1956, with the first three quarters totalling only five points and overall only eleven.; With the league considering expansion to the Perth satellite city of Mandurah, a game between 1995 wooden spooner Swan Districts and Claremont is played at the main football ground of Rushton Park. (Note: Rushton Park, also known under a sponsorship deal as Bendigo Bank Stadium, has been the home of ninth Westar Rules/WAFL club Peel Thunder since it formed in 1997.); Yet again a South Fremantle match yields a late comeback as Subiaco, led by 22 kicks and thirteen marks from half-forward Andrew Donnelly, are behind almost all match but show traces of their 1995 form in coming back to win at the finish.

=== Round 5 ===
	Round 5
Saturday, 4 May	South Fremantle 8.6 (54)	def. by	Swan Districts 7.14 (56)	Rockingham (crowd: 2214)
Saturday, 4 May	Claremont 11.14 (80)	def. by	East Fremantle 16.12 (108)	Claremont Oval (crowd: 1567)
Saturday, 4 May	West Perth 11.14 (80)	def. by	East Perth 12.11 (83)	Arena Joondalup (crowd: 2617)
Saturday, 4 May	Perth 12.12 (84)	def. by	Subiaco 14.14 (98)	Gosnells (crowd: 1597)
With the WAFL recommending relocation of struggling Perth to the Hills region, a match is played in the outer suburb of Gosnells. The experiment is never repeated and the relocation failed.; Perth lead 8.3 (51) to 3.2 (20) before being overwhelmed.; Chris Peel's hard work in damp and windswept conditions allows Swan Districts to hold off South Fremantle, who failed to use the wind during the second quarter when the ground was dry.

=== Round 6 ===
	Round 6
Saturday, 11 May	South Fremantle 14.16 (100)	def.	Claremont 14.9 (93)	Fremantle Oval (crowd: 1890)
Saturday, 11 May	Subiaco 8.5 (53)	def. by	West Perth 16.19 (115)	Subiaco Oval (crowd: 2019)
Saturday, 11 May	East Perth 19.11 (125)	def.	East Fremantle 15.14 (104)	Perth Oval (crowd: 2375)
Saturday, 11 May	Swan Districts 19.10 (124)	def.	Perth 10.4 (64)	Bassendean Oval (crowd: 2347)
The replacement of Greg Wootton by Vance Davison and the comeback at centre half-forward of the injury-plagued ex-star Sumich allows South Fremantle a crucial win in another close match – this time they held off Claremont at the finish.; After having to change his jersey due to bleeding following a cut in his knee, Swan Districts' Rod O'Neill wears Tony Nesbit's old number the week after Nesbit died, and his toughness in defence is lavishly praised and a critical part of Swans' fourth win for 1996.

=== Round 7 ===
	Round 7
Saturday, 18 May	West Perth 16.12 (108)	def.	Swan Districts 12.13 (85)	Arena Joondalup (crowd: 2655)
Saturday, 18 May	Claremont 7.11 (53)	def. by	East Perth 16.11 (107)	Claremont Oval (crowd: 2231)
Sunday, 19 May	Perth 18.13 (121)	def.	South Fremantle 10.20 (80)	Lathlain Park (crowd: 2031)
Sunday, 19 May	East Fremantle 16.13 (109)	def.	Subiaco 13.7 (85)	East Fremantle Oval (crowd: 1938)
East Perth take top position for the first time in twenty seasons as Paul Peos' work as a permanent loose man in defence keeps leading goalkicker Joe Smith goalless, and Claremont are extremely weak in attack all along with no multiple goalscorer, although Phil Gilbert does keep the taller and bigger Gerreyn to one goal from a free.; Sumich and Dorotich score only 0.5 (5) from seven early shots and with Shane Cable scoring seven as a stand-in full-forward, Perth seize the chance resulted as South score an amazing 1.15 (21) to half-time (their first goal was at the eighteen-minute mark of the second quarter) and never come back.

=== Round 8 ===
	Round 8
Saturday, 25 May	Perth 11.7 (73)	def. by	Claremont 13.13 (91)	Lathlain Park (crowd: 1513)
Saturday, 25 May	East Fremantle 17.15 (117)	def.	Swan Districts 15.7 (97)	East Fremantle Oval (crowd: 1957)
Saturday, 25 May	West Perth 17.15 (117)	def.	South Fremantle 15.13 (103)	Arena Joondalup (crowd: 2417)
Saturday, 25 May	East Perth 20.17 (137)	def.	Subiaco 15.9 (99)	Perth Oval (crowd: 2246)
East Perth at one-point lead 20.13 (133) to 5.8 (38) before Subiaco kick last ten goals.

=== Round 9 (Foundation Day) ===
	Round 9
Saturday, 1 June	Swan Districts 13.17 (95)	def. by	East Perth 16.12 (108)	Bassendean Oval (crowd: 3722)
Sunday, 2 June	Claremont 22.14 (146)	def.	Subiaco 9.8 (62)	Albany (crowd: 2105)
Monday, 3 June	Perth 13.8 (86)	def. by	West Perth 13.13 (91)	Lathlain Park (crowd: 2836)
Monday, 3 June	South Fremantle 20.12 (132)	def.	East Fremantle 10.9 (69)	Fremantle Oval (crowd: 7777)
East Perth show their premiership credentials with the manner of their fightback against Swan Districts, who led by thirty points and half-time before Turnbull took control in the ruck.; One brilliant burst by Troy Wilson where he kicks four goals in ten minutes during the final quarter saves West Perth from a major upset against the tenacious Demons, who previously held an eleven-point lead.

=== Round 10 ===
	Round 10
Saturday, 8 June	Subiaco 19.7 (121)	def.	Swan Districts 16.11 (107)	Subiaco Oval (crowd: 1755)
Saturday, 8 June	East Perth 16.17 (113)	def.	South Fremantle 17.5 (107)	Perth Oval (crowd: 3408)
Saturday, 8 June	West Perth 11.6 (72)	def. by	Claremont 17.6 (108)	Arena Joondalup (crowd: 2514)
Saturday, 8 June	East Fremantle 18.14 (122)	def.	Perth 7.11 (53)	East Fremantle Oval (crowd: 1603)
South Fremantle kick an amazing 10.0 (60) to half-time and 14.1 (85) to three-quarter time before their accuracy deserts them slightly – though only a last-minute goal by Betheras denies them a draw with the pacesetter. It was the Bulldogs' fourth loss by a goal or less for 1996.

=== Round 11 ===
	Round 11
Saturday, 15 June	South Fremantle 17.18 (120)	def.	Subiaco 7.9 (51)	Fremantle Oval (crowd: 1643)
Saturday, 15 June	Perth 7.9 (51)	def. by	East Perth 11.14 (80)	Lathlain Park (crowd: 1625)
Saturday, 15 June	Claremont 1.7 (13)	def. by	Swan Districts 12.14 (86)	Claremont Oval (crowd: 1308)
Saturday, 15 June	West Perth 9.9 (63)	def.	East Fremantle 4.9 (33)	Arena Joondalup (crowd: 1262)
At the beginning of an uncharacteristically wet spell for modern times in Perth, Claremont kick their second score of 1.7 (13) in two years, equalling their second lowest all time score. The match was played with electric street lights on to aid the players, whilst Claremont were never in the hunt after getting into attack once in the first fifteen minutes.; Two teams – Perth and East Fremantle – fail to goal after half-time, but Troy Wilson kicks seven including four in ten minutes on a day where winds blew rain horizontally.

=== Round 12 ===
	Round 12
Saturday, 22 June	Swan Districts 28.16 (184)	def.	South Fremantle 9.10 (64)	Bassendean Oval (crowd: 2193)
Saturday, 22 June	East Fremantle 18.10 (118)	def.	Claremont 11.11 (77)	East Fremantle Oval (crowd: 1405)
Saturday, 22 June	Subiaco 17.8 (110)	def.	Perth 14.8 (92)	Subiaco Oval (crowd: 1243)
Saturday, 22 June	East Perth 11.11 (77)	def.	West Perth 9.6 (60)	Perth Oval (crowd: 4522)
East Perth emerge winners – owing to Graham and Crough keeping Troy Wilson to two goals – in a match that showed West Perth's move to Joondalup had not weakened the WAFL's greatest rivalry.; Clive Waterhouse kicks nine goals, seven behinds in Swan Districts' second successive spectacular win, their biggest over South Fremantle beating a 108-point win from 1964.

=== Round 13 ===
	Round 13
Saturday, 6 July	Perth 14.9 (93)	def.	Swan Districts 11.11 (77)	Lathlain Park (crowd: 1892)
Saturday, 6 July	East Fremantle 9.8 (62)	def. by	East Perth 19.9 (123)	East Fremantle Oval (crowd: 2341)
Saturday, 6 July	Claremont 12.18 (90)	def.	South Fremantle 7.5 (47)	Claremont Oval (crowd: 1616)
Saturday, 6 July	West Perth 19.17 (131)	def.	Subiaco 15.8 (98)	Arena Joondalup (crowd: 2211)
East Perth record their tenth straight win for their best run since 1961.; With nine AFL-listed players, Claremont recover from two bad defeats to push the Bulldogs to two wins from the four, as South Fremantle lack forward support for the well-held Dorotich.; 1995 Simpson Medallist Darren Harris bounces back to his best after a serious concussion in the previous match with the Lions, as West Perth kick thirteen of the last seventeen goals to be back in the four.

=== Round 14 ===
	Round 14
Saturday, 13 July	East Perth 10.4 (64)	def. by	Claremont 13.10 (88)	Perth Oval (crowd: 3173)
Saturday, 13 July	Swan Districts 16.8 (104)	def.	West Perth 9.10 (64)	Bassendean Oval (crowd: 2718)
Saturday, 13 July	South Fremantle 14.13 (97)	def.	Perth 13.14 (92)	Fremantle Oval (crowd: 1914)
Saturday, 13 July	Subiaco 11.21 (87)	def. by	East Fremantle 17.9 (111)	Subiaco Oval (crowd: 1525)
Thirty possessions from rejected midfielder Dean Trovarello leads Claremont to put an end to East Perth's ten-match winning streak, with coach Daniel Panizza saying a run in the reserves had done Trovarello good.; Subiaco kicks eight of their eleven goals in the second quarter.

=== Round 15 ===
	Round 15
Saturday, 20 July	Swan Districts 8.14 (62)	def. by	East Fremantle 16.7 (103)	Bassendean Oval (crowd: 2132)
Saturday, 20 July	South Fremantle 11.9 (75)	def.	West Perth 10.11 (71)	Fremantle Oval (crowd: 1501)
Saturday, 20 July	Subiaco 5.9 (39)	def. by	East Perth 22.15 (147)	Subiaco Oval (crowd: 1886)
Saturday, 20 July	Claremont 19.9 (123)	def.	Perth 6.13 (49)	Claremont Oval (crowd: 1279)

=== Round 16 ===
	Round 16
Saturday, 27 July	West Perth 3.12 (30)	def. by	Perth 11.19 (85)	Arena Joondalup (crowd: 850)
Saturday, 27 July	East Perth 8.12 (60)	def.	Swan Districts 4.9 (33)	Perth Oval (crowd: 1674)
Saturday, 27 July	Subiaco 9.15 (69)	def. by	Claremont 12.11 (83)	Subiaco Oval (crowd: 900)
Saturday, 27 July	East Fremantle 9.9 (63)	def.	South Fremantle 8.10 (58)	East Fremantle Oval (crowd: 2113)
Steady rainfall of 134.6 millimetres (5.30 in) over two weeks – the steadiest in Perth since anthropogenic global warming began to dry the climate – leads to very heavy conditions where bottom team Perth upsets likely finalists West Perth, whose score remains the lowest against the Demons since 1967.; The Demons' skill in gale-force winds and mud via a three-man attack to keep the goals open gives them a 6.1 (37) to 0.2 (2) lead at quarter-time, which West Perth can never claw back.; East Perth take advantage of Swan Districts' early wastefulness with the wind to soundly defeat the black and whites, whose forwards score only 2.4 (16) after quarter-time.

=== Round 17 ===
	Round 17
Saturday, 3 August	South Fremantle 8.18 (66)	def. by	East Perth 12.13 (85)	Fremantle Oval (crowd: 2583)
Saturday, 3 August	Swan Districts 32.15 (207)	def.	Subiaco 10.12 (72)	Bassendean Oval (crowd: 1707)
Saturday, 3 August	Claremont 13.13 (91)	def.	West Perth 3.6 (24)	Claremont Oval (crowd: 1360)
Saturday, 3 August	Perth 4.16 (40)	def. by	East Fremantle 8.10 (58)	Lathlain Park (crowd: 1541)
West Perth become the first team since East Fremantle in the Preliminary and Grand Finals of 1924 to score three or fewer goals in consecutive open-age WAFL games.; In contrast, despite the windy and damp conditions, Swan Districts annihilate Subiaco with thirteen different goalkickers and two ten-goal quarters.

=== Round 18 ===
	Round 18
Saturday, 10 August	Subiaco 13.14 (92)	def.	South Fremantle 11.14 (80)	Subiaco Oval (crowd: 1101)
Saturday, 10 August	East Fremantle 6.11 (47)	def. by	West Perth 9.12 (66)	East Fremantle Oval (crowd: 1479)
Saturday, 10 August	East Perth 5.6 (36)	def. by	Perth 5.19 (49)	Perth Oval (crowd: 1808)
Sunday, 11 August	Swan Districts 13.15 (93)	def. by	Claremont 16.15 (111)	Bassendean Oval (crowd: 2453)
In very windy conditions with 22.2 millimetres (0.87 in) of rain, East Fremantle kick only one goal in three quarters and top team East Perth not only are beaten by bottom club Perth but lose Scott Loving and Devan Perry to one-match suspensions.; West Perth rebound from two previous disasters, adapting well to "arctic" conditions and moving to within percentage of fourth-placed Swan Districts.

=== Round 19 ===
	Round 19
Saturday, 17 August	South Fremantle 12.12 (84)	def. by	Swan Districts 16.13 (109)	Fremantle Oval (crowd: 1903)
Saturday, 17 August	Claremont 8.7 (55)	def. by	East Fremantle 10.12 (72)	Claremont Oval (crowd: 1651)
Saturday, 17 August	Perth 24.16 (160)	def.	Subiaco 7.4 (46)	Lathlain Park (crowd: 1557)
Saturday, 17 August	West Perth 12.16 (88)	def.	East Perth 10.7 (67)	Arena Joondalup (crowd: 3276)
Perth move off the bottom of the ladder by thrashing 1995 minor premiers Subiaco, who apart from forwards Macnish and Dan Parker appear totally disinterested, whilst the unknown Craig Shearer kicks eight.

=== Round 20 ===
	Round 20
Saturday, 24 August	South Fremantle 12.9 (81)	def.	Claremont 9.15 (69)	Fremantle Oval (crowd: 1628)
Saturday, 24 August	Subiaco 4.8 (32)	def. by	West Perth 15.21 (111)	Subiaco Oval (crowd: 1760)
Saturday, 24 August	Swan Districts 7.9 (51)	def. by	Perth 16.6 (102)	Bassendean Oval (crowd: 2249)
Saturday, 24 August	East Perth 14.12 (96)	def. by	East Fremantle 15.12 (102)	Perth Oval (crowd: 2031)
With coach Gary Buckenara announcing his resignation before the match, Subiaco collapse after a competitive opening forty minutes, scoring only 1.6 (12) to 12.10 (82) for the rest of the match and sealing their first wooden spoon since 1982.; 6.0 (36) to 2.5 (17) against a strong wind effectively seals Perth's fourth victory in seven matches and leaves Swans needing a win over the in-form Cardinals to make the four.

=== Round 21 ===
	Round 21
Saturday, 31 August	East Fremantle 26.17 (173)	def.	Subiaco 11.16 (82)	East Fremantle Oval (crowd: 1623)
Saturday, 31 August	Claremont 12.14 (86)	def.	East Perth 8.7 (55)	Claremont Oval (crowd: 2019)
Saturday, 31 August	West Perth 13.18 (96)	def.	Swan Districts 11.4 (70)	Arena Joondalup (crowd: 4671)
Saturday, 31 August	Perth 11.11 (77)	def. by	South Fremantle 18.11 (119)	Lathlain Park (crowd: 1726)
In an amazing match, Subiaco are 2.12 (24) at three-quarter time but kick 9.4 (58) to 7.3 (45) in a last-quarter shootout, as the Sharks experiment with players in different positions.; West Perth comfortably secure a semi-final berth despite inaccuracy over lethargic Swan Districts, whilst in a preview of the Grand Final, Claremont hold East Perth to 0.1 (1) into the wind to claim the double chance.; Jon Dorotich breaks Jason Heatley's 1993 record for the most goals without a behind, as he scores thirteen straight goals from fourteen kicks, capitalising perfectly on ex-Demon Stephen Pears' dominance of the ruck despite crowd taunts.

== Ladder ==
1996 WAFL ladder
Pos	Team	Pld	W	L	D	PF	PA	PP	Pts
1	East Perth	21	14	7	0	1960	1566	125.2	56
2	Claremont (P)	21	14	7	0	1938	1565	123.8	56
3	East Fremantle	21	14	7	0	1924	1814	106.1	56
4	West Perth	21	11	10	0	1719	1660	103.6	44
5	Swan Districts	21	9	12	0	2076	1799	115.4	36
6	South Fremantle	21	9	12	0	1873	1934	96.8	36
7	Perth	21	7	14	0	1660	1900	87.4	28
8	Subiaco	21	6	15	0	1619	2531	64.0	24

Rules for classification: 1) points; 2) percentage; 3) number of points for.
(P) Premiers

== Finals ==
=== Semi-finals ===
	First semi-final
Sunday, 8 September	East Fremantle 18.13 (121)	def.	West Perth 7.9 (51)	Subiaco Oval (crowd: 10,184)
East Fremantle belie their previous poor record against West Perth, completely outclassing the Falcons for three quarters after defender Mellody has an amazing fifteen possessions in the first quarter.

	Second semi-final
Sunday, 8 September	Claremont 12.18 (90)	def. by	East Perth 15.6 (96)	Subiaco Oval (crowd: 10,184)
Since the two semi-finals were played at the same venue on the same day, the attendance figure is the same.; Jeff White's ruck power wins for East Perth via an explosive burst of 4.1 (25) unanswered in fifteen minutes against the inaccurate Tigers.

=== Preliminary final ===
	Preliminary final
Sunday, 15 September	East Fremantle 5.10 (40)	def. by	Claremont 11.16 (82)	Subiaco Oval (crowd: 4,698)
In a very physical man-on-man game in heavy rain and strong winds, Claremont thrashed the Sharks after half-time, kicking 7.10 (52) to a mere 1.3 (9) – including three goals to one behind into a strong breeze in the third quarter.

=== Grand Final ===
1996 WAFL Grand Final
Sunday, 22 September	East Perth	def. by	Claremont	Subiaco Oval (crowd: 29,771)
3.3 (21); 8.6 (54); 9.8 (62); 12.12 (84)	Q1; Q2; Q3; Final	2.0 (12); 7.1 (43); 10.5 (65); 13.8 (86)	Umpires: Sam Kronja, Wayne French, Adam Binks; Simpson Medal: Todd Ridley (Claremont)
Gerreyn 4, Turnbull 2, Loving 2, Colbung, White, Swan, Worland	Goals	Ridley 7, Lewis 4, Pyke, Ferguson
Loving, Faithfull, Miller, Gerreyn, Betharas, Turnbull	Best	Lewis, Pyke, Ridley, Egan, Ferguson, Guard, Edwards
Gerreyn for wrestling Spencer; Fuller (runner) for misconduct	Reports	Spencer for wrestling and striking Gerreyn; Gilbert for attempting to strike Silcock
West Coast Eagle veterans Pyke and Lewis possess crucial freshness to permit Claremont to win its fifth premiership in ten years against an East Perth club playing its first Grand Final since 1978. Ridley kicks his goals with a major knee injury; In a spiteful game, both clubs were reported for "bringing the game into disrepute".
