= Phil Cronan =

Australian rules footballer (born 1959)

Personal information
- Full name: Phillip Roy Cronan
- Born: 17 July 1959 (age 67)
- Original teams: South Fremantle, (WAFL)

Playing career^{1}
Years	Club	Games (Goals)
1979–1982,1990–1991	South Fremantle	102
1983	West Perth	22 (14)
1984–1986	St Kilda	49 (21)
1987–1988	Footscray	26 (5)
1989	Woodville	22

Representative team honours
Years	Team	Games (Goals)
1981–1984	Western Australia	8 (1)

Coaching career
Years	Club	Games (W–L–D)
1997	Swan Districts	20 (11–9–0)
- ^{1} Playing statistics correct to the end of 1991.

Phillip Roy Cronan (born 17 July 1959) is an Australian rules footballer who played for St Kilda and Footscray in the Victorian Football League (VFL) in between 1984 and 1988.

He first played for South Fremantle in the West Australian Football League (WAFL) between 1979 and 1982, including in South's 1980 WAFL Grand Final winning side. In December 1982 he announced that he wanted to leave South Fremantle and join Perth. However on 11 January 1983 he signed to play for West Perth. He played in all 21 WAFL games and in West Perth's loss to Sydney Swans in the 1983 Sterling Cup national competition.

When Cronan moved to play for St Kilda in 1984, West Perth, Swan Districts and the WAFL applied to the Supreme Court of Victoria for an injunction to prevent him and fellow West Australian Phil Narkle from playing in the VFL. The Western Australian clubs claimed that the players were still contracted to their WAFL clubs and should not be cleared to play in the VFL. The judge, Justice Kaye, refused to hear the applications to issue an injunction, due to the expected seven-day duration of the applications. He also questioned the importance of the case in relation to other cases, stating "It seems to me that football cases should not be heard in this court" and "there are other matters ... which are more important than football". Both Cronan and Narkle continued to play for St Kilda. On 19 April 1984, the VFL and WAFL agreed on a new clearance system to avoid future legal challenges.

After being delisted by Footscray, Cronan moved to South Australia where he played for Woodville in 1989. He then returned to Western Australia where he played for South Fremantle for two more seasons before retiring. Cronan played in eight state games for Western Australia.

He later turned to coaching, leading Swan Districts in 1997. He has also coached junior teams, including the South Fremantle colts (Under 19) team in 1998 and the Western Australian State Under 18s team in 2002. From 2011 to 2012, he was the coach of the East Fremantle colts team.
