= Gordon Casey =

Australian rules footballer

Personal information
- Full name: Gordon Casey
- Born: 25 March 1950 (age 76)
- Original team: Gorya
- Height: 180 cm (5 ft 11 in)
- Weight: 85 kg (187 lb)

Playing career^{1}
Years	Club	Games (Goals)
1968	Carlton	1 (1)
1969–1975	Footscray	125 (5)
Total		126 (6)
- ^{1} Playing statistics correct to the end of 1975.

Gordon Casey (born 25 March 1950) is a former Australian rules footballer who played with Carlton and Footscray in the Victorian Football League (VFL).

Casey, recruited from Gorya (towns of Speed & Turriff), started his career as a forward and was the Carlton reserves leading goal-kicker in both 1967 and 1968. He only got one opportunity to play in the seniors and in 1969 he tried his luck at a new club, Footscray. His time at Footscray was spent in the back pocket and he was good enough to represent Victoria against Tasmania in 1973. He later played at Swan Districts and appeared in the 1980 WAFL Grand Final.
