= Adrian Bromage =

Australian rules footballer and businessman

Personal information
- Full name: Adrian Stuart Bromage
- Born: 11 May 1971 (age 55)
- Original team: Bairnsdale (GFL)
- Position: Midfielder

Playing career^{1}
Years	Club	Games (Goals)
1996–1998	East Fremantle	50 (10)
- ^{1} Playing statistics correct to the end of 1998.

Career highlights
- Sandover Medal 1998; East Fremantle premiership player 1998; Simpson Medal 1998 (Grand Final)

Adrian Stuart Bromage (born 11 May 1971) is a businessman and former Australian rules footballer who most notably played for East Fremantle in the Western Australian Football League (WAFL) during the 1990s. He was the winner of the Sandover Medal for the best and fairest player in the 1998 Westar Rules season.

== Early career ==
Originally from Bruthen, Victoria, Bromage played senior football for the Bairnsdale Football Club in the Gippsland Football League (GFL) from the age of 16. He was selected to play for Victoria Country in the Teal Cup, but neglected a career in the Australian Football League (AFL) for university.

== WAFL career ==
While on a trip around Australia, Bromage arrived in Perth, where was recruited by East Fremantle ahead of the 1996 WAFL season. He played 13 games in 1996, and another 16 in 1997, playing in the Sharks' losing grand final team in 1997. He had a stand-out season in 1998, winning both the Sandover Medal, for the best player in the competition, and the Simpson Medal, for the best player in the Sharks' premiership-winning grand final team. Bromage left the WAFL at the end of 1998 to pursue business interests in Gippsland. After spending 1999 overseas, Bromage returned to Bairnsdale Football Club. At Bairnsdale, he coached for five seasons, winning four premierships during that time.

== Business career ==
Bromage owned and managed the Moorings at Metung in the 2000s and developed 5knots, a boutique accommodation complex in Metung. He also served as Chairperson of East Gippsland Region Business and Tourism Association and the Shire’s Tourism Advisory Board, as well as the East Gippsland Economic Development Advisory board.

Bromage spent 7 years with the AFL, until late 2019, as a Gippsland Football Development Manager and is now the current Managing Director of Metung Hot Springs.

In September 2024, Bromage joined East Fremantle Football Club as general manager of football operations. He was soon appointed interim CEO and then appointed CEO in a full-time capacity on 11 November 2024.
