= Tony Solin =

Australian rules footballer

Personal information
- Full name: Anthony Solin
- Born: 3 September 1957 (age 69)

Playing career^{1}
Years	Club	Games (Goals)
1975–1979	South Fremantle	3 (0)
1980–1985, 1988	Swan Districts	118 (27)
1986–1987	East Fremantle	36 (8)

Representative team honours
Years	Team	Games (Goals)
1983	Western Australia	2 (0)

Coaching career
Years	Club	Games (W–L–D)
1993–1994	Subiaco	47 (26–21–0)
- ^{1} Playing statistics correct to the end of 1988.

Career highlights
- WAFL Premiership player - 1982, 1983, 1984

Anthony Solin (born 3 September 1957) is a former Australian rules footballer who played in the West Australian Football League (WAFL) for Swan Districts, South Fremantle and East Fremantle. He later unsuccessfully attempted to enter politics, standing for the Western Australian Legislative Assembly seat of Mandurah at the 2013 state election.

== Biography ==
Solin is the brother of fellow former footballer Robert Solin. He is married with two daughters.

== Football career ==
Solin's career began at South Fremantle. Moving to Swan Districts in 1980 Solin joined the formidable side that won a hat-trick of premierships during the 1980s.

Playing as a half back flanker for the 1980 Grand Final Solin was one of the best on ground and managed to kick two goals in a losing side. In 1982 Solin played on the half back flank again and kicked one goal as part of the premiership team; in the 1983 premiership side Solin lined up at fullback playing on Warren Ralph (who kicked three goals but was still well held).

Selected for the WA State Team in 1983 as a part of the team that beat Victoria but lost to South Australia.

For the 1984 Grand Final, Solin played on the half back flank again and was a useful contributor in his third premiership side. Leaving to play for East Fremantle in 1986 and staying with Old Easts through 1987, he returned to Swan Districts in 1988 to play twelve more games before retiring. Solin went on to coach at Subiaco for the 1993 and 1994 seasons.

== Working life ==
Before resigning in October 2012 to pursue a political career, Solin worked as a public relations director for Health Solutions WA (HSWA), operator of the Peel Health Campus. Tony Solin was appointed CEO of the Rockingham Kwinana Chamber of Commerce in 2012 and has been instrumental in building the organisation that is now recognised as one of the two best performing metropolitan chambers in Western Australia. He is currently still in this role.

== Political career ==
In September 2012 Solin announced his candidature for the Western Australian Legislative Assembly seat of Mandurah representing the Liberal Party. The seat was retained by the Australian Labor Party sitting member David Templeman who garnered 59% of the two party preferred vote compared with Solin's 41%.
