= Dick Jones (Australian footballer) =

Australian rules footballer (1926–2013)

Personal information
- Full name: Richard Henry Jones
- Born: 5 June 1926; Goomalling, Western Australia
- Died: 16 January 2013 (aged 86); Myrtle Bank, South Australia
- Original team: East Fremantle
- Height: 173 cm (5 ft 8 in)
- Weight: 72 kg (159 lb)
- Position: Rover

Playing career^{1}
Years	Club	Games (Goals)
1949, 1951	South Melbourne	19 (28)

Coaching career
Years	Club	Games (W–L–D)
1957–1958	West Torrens	37 (18–17–2)
- ^{1} Playing statistics correct to the end of 1958.

Richard Henry Jones (5 June 1926 – 16 January 2013) was an Australian rules footballer who played with South Melbourne in the Victorian Football League (VFL).

== Biography ==
Jones, a rover, joined South Melbourne from East Fremantle, but hailed from rural Western Australia.

Jones kicked a goal in all but one of his 17 games and topped South Melbourne's goal-kicking with 27 majors. During the year he was acting vice-captain.

In 1950 he returned to Western Australia and captain-coached Boulder City to a Goldfields National Football League premiership.

Jones resumed his VFL career in 1951 but only appeared in the opening two rounds of the season.

The next stage of his career was spent in South Australia, starting at Glenelg in 1952. He stopped playing football at the end of the year and concentrated on his police career, before returning briefly in 1956.

In 1957 he was appointed captain-coach of West Torrens and guided them to a fourth-place finish that year. He retired as a player in 1958 but stayed on as coach and was then involved in controversy when he chose to delist aging club great Bob Hank.

Jones was a television and radio commentator in the SANFL during the 1970s and 1980s.

Jones died in Myrtle Bank, South Australia on 16 January 2013, at the age of 86.
