= Jack Scobie =

Australian rules footballer

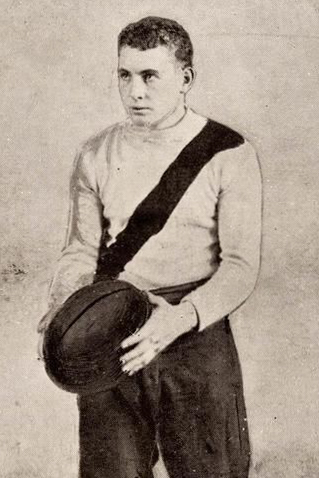
- Scobie in 1910

Personal information
- Full name: John Richmond Scobie
- Born: 22 September 1891; Richmond, Victoria
- Died: 23 April 1974 (aged 82); Hawthorn, Victoria
- Original team: Rose of Northcote
- Height: 178 cm (5 ft 10 in)
- Weight: 83 kg (183 lb)

Playing career^{1}
| Years | Club | Games (Goals) |
| 1909–1913 | South Melbourne | 75 (4) |
| 1914–1918 | East Fremantle | 58 (13) |
| 1919 | Carlton | 11 (0) |
- ^{1} Playing statistics correct to the end of 1919.

John Richmond Scobie (22 September 1891 – 23 April 1974) was an Australian rules footballer who played with South Melbourne and Carlton in the Victorian Football League (VFL) and for East Fremantle in the West Australian Football League (WAFL).

Originally from junior club Rose of Northcote, Scobie made his senior VFL debut in 1909 and was South Melbourne's full-back in their 1909 premiership side, the club's first at VFL level. He was the youngest member of the grand final winning side, having turned 18 only ten days prior. While at South Melbourne he was regarded as one of the top defenders in the league.

Scobie spent four more seasons with South Melbourne and played as a half back flanker in the 1912 VFL Grand Final, but this time finished on the losing side.

During the war he played in Western Australia with East Fremantle and participated in their 1914 and 1918 premierships.

He finished his career back in Victoria, where he spent a year playing for Carlton Football Club in the VFL.
