= Harvey Kelly =

Australian rules footballer (1883–1944)

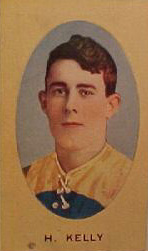

Personal information
- Full name: William Harvey Kelly
- Born: 24 March 1883; St Kilda, Victoria
- Died: 30 July 1944 (aged 61); Croydon, Victoria
- Original team: Graham Street Wesleys
- Height: 183 cm (6 ft 0 in)
- Weight: 84 kg (185 lb)
- Position: Forward

Playing career^{1}
Years	Club	Games (Goals)
1902	South Melbourne	9 (4)
1903–1904	East Fremantle	24 (35)
1905–1906	South Fremantle	33
1907–1909	Carlton	43 (75)
1910–1911	Lefroy	18
1913–1914	South Melbourne	40 (48)

Coaching career
Years	Club	Games (W–L–D)
1913	South Melbourne	19 (14–4–1)
- ^{1} Playing statistics correct to the end of 1914.

Harvey "Duff" Kelly (24 March 1883 – 30 July 1944) was an Australian rules footballer who played for South Melbourne and Carlton in the Victorian Football League (VFL).

Western Australian Harvey Kelly played most of his games at centre half forward and was noted for his long, accurate drop and place kicks. He started out at South Melbourne in 1902 but after just one season returned home and joined East Fremantle. A member of East's 1904 premiership team, he crossed to rivals South Fremantle in 1905. His brothers Ernie and Otto, who both had VFL careers, played beside him at South Fremantle.

While in Western Australia, Kelly played two first-class cricket matches for the state, as a bowler.

Kelly went to Carlton in 1907 and participated in their premiership side that year. The following season Carlton won all of the 14 games that Kelly played in and added another premiership to their tally, with the forward kicking a goal in the Grand Final. Also in 1908 he represented Victoria at the Melbourne Carnival. He kicked a career best 28 goals in 1909 and made his third successive Grand Final, only to lose to his old club South Melbourne.

In both 1910 and 1911, Kelly played his football in Tasmania for the Lefroy Football Club. He impressed enough to represent Tasmania at the 1911 Adelaide Carnival.

He toured New Zealand in 1912, with the South Melbourne Cricket Club.

Although Carlton refused to clear him initially, he was signed up by South Melbourne as coach for the 1913 season. Under Kelly the club finished the home and away season in second position but struggled in the finals and failed to make the premiership decider. His last game in the VFL was the 1914 VFL Grand Final, which South Melbourne lost to Carlton.

== See also ==
- 1908 Melbourne Carnival
- List of Western Australia first-class cricketers
