= Haydon Kilmartin =

Australian rules footballer

Personal information
- Full name: Haydon Kilmartin
- Born: 22 July 1973 (age 53)
- Original team: North Hobart
- Draft: No. 31, 1991 National Draft (Mel); No. 12, 1998 Preseason Draft (Haw)
- Height: 178 cm (5 ft 10 in)
- Weight: 80 kg (176 lb)

Playing career^{1}
Years	Club	Games (Goals)
1992–1993	Melbourne	0 (0)
1995–1997	East Fremantle	51 (15)
1998	Hawthorn	10 (1)
- ^{1} Playing statistics correct to the end of 1998.

Haydon Kilmartin (born 22 July 1973) is a former Australian rules footballer who played with Hawthorn in the Australian Football League (AFL).

After playing in a premiership team at North Hobart in 1991, Kilmartin was picked up by Melbourne in the 1991 National Draft, with pick 31. He never played a senior AFL game for Melbourne and spent the next stage of his career in Western Australia, where he played for East Fremantle. In 1997 he finished second in the Sandover Medal and took part in the Westar Rules Grand Final loss to South Fremantle. On the back of his performances that year, he was selected by Hawthorn in the 1998 pre-season draft and made 10 appearances in the 1998 AFL season, mostly off the bench.
