= Paul Lindsay =

Australian rules footballer

Personal information
- Full name: Paul Lindsay
- Born: 28 February 1976 (age 50)
- Original team: East Fremantle
- Height: 198 cm (6 ft 6 in)
- Weight: 100 kg (220 lb)

Playing career^{1}
Years	Club	Games (Goals)
1999	Geelong	2 (0)
- ^{1} Playing statistics correct to the end of 1999.

Paul Lindsay (born 28 February 1976) is a former Australian rules footballer who played with Geelong in the Australian Football League (AFL).

A ruckman, Lindsay was already an established player at East Fremantle before coming to Geelong. He played 45 games for East Fremantle from 1995 to 1997 and took part in the 1997 Westar Rules Grand Final, which they lost to South Fremantle.

Lindsay made two appearances in the 1999 AFL season, in rounds 12 and 13, filling in for regular ruckman Steven King.

He played 153 SANFL games for Woodville-West Torrens after leaving Geelong and in 2009 returned to East Fremantle for one final season, adding 19 games to his tally.
