= Ernie Kelly =

Australian rules footballer (1884–1939)

Personal information
- Full name: Ernest Harvey Kelly
- Born: 17 November 1884; Port Melbourne, Victoria
- Died: 22 May 1939 (aged 54); Heidelberg, Victoria
- Height: 191 cm (6 ft 3 in)
- Weight: 84 kg (185 lb)

Playing career^{1}
Years	Club	Games (Goals)
1903–04	East Fremantle	26 (43)
1905–07	South Fremantle	17
1908	Carlton	8 (11)
- ^{1} Playing statistics correct to the end of 1908.

Career highlights
- East Fremantle leading goalkicker 1904; WAFA leading goalkicker 1904; East Fremantle premiership side 1904

Ernest Harvey Kelly (17 November 1884 – 22 May 1939) was an Australian rules footballer who played for East Fremantle and South Fremantle in the Western Australian Football Association (WAFA) and Carlton in the Victorian Football League (VFL).

== Career ==
Although he was from Melbourne, Kelly started his career in Western Australia. He was East Fremantle's leading goal-kicker in 1904 and also a member of their premiership team that year, alongside his elder brothers Harvey and Otto Kelly. The three brothers all joined South Fremantle and played together in 1905 and 1906. Harvey Kelly returned to Victoria in 1907 and after Ernie played another season for South Fremantle, he joined his brother at Carlton in 1908.

Carlton had been premiers the previous two seasons so Kelly could only break into the seniors on eight occasions. On his league debut, against Melbourne, he kicked three goals.
