= Craig Hoyer =

Australian rules footballer

Personal information
- Full name: Craig Hoyer
- Born: 6 September 1960 (age 66)
- Original team: Redcliffe Junior Football Club
- Height: 198 cm (6 ft 6 in)
- Weight: 96 kg (212 lb)

Playing career^{1}
Years	Club	Games (Goals)
1978 - 1980	Swan Districts	42 (61)
1981 - 1983	Hawthorn	4 (0)
1984 - 1985	Swan Districts	19 (9)
1986 - 1988	Hobart Football Club	74 (53)
1989 - 1991	Devonport Football Club	51 (39)
- ^{1} Playing statistics correct to the end of 1997.

Craig Hoyer (born 6 September 1960) is a former Australian rules footballer who played with Hawthorn in the Victorian Football League (VFL).

Hoyer was a ruckman, originally from Redcliffe, who had played three seasons with Swan Districts before joining Hawthorn. The Western Australian was restricted to just four senior games for Hawthorn. Craig returned to Swan Districts for the 1984 and 1985 WAFL seasons. Craig signed with the Hobart Football Club for the 1986 season. In both 1986 and 1987, Hoyer won Hobart's "Best and Fairest" award and came runner-up in the 1986 William Leitch Medal to Andy Bennett from Sandy Bay. Hoyer left Hobart at the end of the 1988 season and joined the Devonport Blues for the 1989 season, and was chosen to represent Tasmania against Victoria during the 1989 State of Origin match, Hoyer suffered a badly broken leg during the 1990 season before returning for his final season in 1991. Hoyer then moved to Lauderdale Football Club in the STFL where he played and coached over a number of successful years before moving to the Kingston Tigers in 1995 under Scott Wade in which they played together at Hawthorn & Hobart. Kingston where Premiers at the conclusion of the 1995 season. Hoyer went on to win another Premiership at Kingston at the conclusion of the 1997 season under former Cartlon & Fitzroy player, Leigh McConnon.
