= Otto Kelly =

Australian sportsman (1880–1946)

Personal information
- Full name: Otto Harvey Kelly
- Born: 15 May 1880; Sandridge, Victoria
- Died: 30 July 1946 (aged 66); Mount Lawley, Western Australia
- Height: 179 cm (5 ft 10 in)
- Weight: 80 kg (176 lb)

Playing career^{1}
Years	Club	Games (Goals)
1902	South Melbourne	16 (0)
1903–1904	East Fremantle	15 (9)
1905–1907	South Fremantle	30
- ^{1} Playing statistics correct to the end of 1907.

Otto Harvey Kelly (15 May 1880 – 30 July 1946) was an Australian sportsman who represented Western Australia as a first-class cricketer and played for South Melbourne in the Victorian Football League (VFL). Kelly also played for East Fremantle and South Fremantle in the West Australian Football Association (WAFA).

The eldest of three brothers in the VFL, Kelly participated in 16 of a possible 17 games in the 1902 season. His brother, Harvey, was also with South Melbourne that year and his other brother Ernie would later play at Carlton. Along with Harvey, Kelly made his way to Western Australia in 1903 and signed with East Fremantle. All three brothers were members of the 1904 East Fremantle premiership side. He switched to rival club South Fremantle in 1905 and played for them in three WAFA seasons.

As his football career was coming to an end, Kelly was at his peak as a cricketer and made two appearances for Western Australia, both against New South Wales, in the 1906/07 cricket season. He played as a right-handed top order batsman but could only manage scores of 23, 0, 13 and 4 in the four innings. In 1907/08 he was picked for his third and final first-class match, against the touring Marylebone Cricket Club from England. He scored 22 in the first innings, dismissed by Wilfred Rhodes, and 13 not out in the second.

A nephew, Ernest Bromley was the first Western Australian to play cricket for Australia.

== See also ==
- List of Western Australia first-class cricketers
