= Wayne Delmenico =

Australian rules footballer

Personal information
- Full name: Kevin Wayne Delmenico
- Born: 21 August 1952 (age 74)
- Original team: Lemnos
- Height: 183 cm (6 ft 0 in)
- Weight: 83 kg (183 lb)
- Position: Centre half-back/Centre half-forward

Playing career^{1}
Years	Club	Games (Goals)
1972–75	Melbourne	31 (1)
1976–83	South Fremantle	128
- ^{1} Playing statistics correct to the end of 1983.

Kevin Wayne Delmenico (born 21 August 1952) is a former Australian rules footballer who played for Melbourne in the Victorian Football League (VFL) and South Fremantle in the West Australian Football League (WAFL).

Delmenico played his early football with Lemnos in the Goulburn Valley Football League before spending four seasons at Melbourne. A key defender, he kicked the only goal of his VFL career against Richmond in his second game.

After playing 31 games in four seasons, he was recruited to play in Darwin, where he was approached to move to Western Australia and played for South Fremantle from 1976 to 1983, during which time he played 128 games. He was a member of South's 1980 WAFL Grand Final winning team and represented Western Australia against South Australia in 1981.

He currently holds the position of President of the South Fremantle Football Club Past Players and Officials Association and is a current Delegate for the WAFL Combined Past Players and Officials Association representing South Fremantle.
