= Les Jones (footballer, born February 1910) =

Australian rules footballer, born 1910

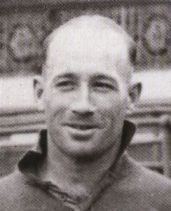

Personal information
- Full name: Leslie Jones
- Born: 22 February 1910; Beverley, Western Australia
- Died: 11 January 1956 (aged 45); Northcote, Victoria
- Height: 175 cm (5 ft 9 in)
- Weight: 82 kg (181 lb)
- Position: Half forward

Playing career^{1}
Years	Club	Games (Goals)
1928–1932	East Fremantle	89 (65)
1933–1941	Melbourne	121 (88)
- ^{1} Playing statistics correct to the end of 1941.

Leslie Jones (22 February 1910 – 11 January 1956) was an Australian rules footballer who played with Melbourne in the Victorian Football League (VFL).

Jones was a member of three premiership teams at East Fremantle, in 1928, 1929 and 1930. The Western Australian player came to Melbourne in 1933 and went on to appear in nine seasons with the club, mostly at half forward. He was on a half forward flank in their 1939 premiership team, contributing three goals in the grand final. The following year he became playing coach of Terang, but returned to Melbourne mid-season. He made one appearance in 1941, then enlisted in the Royal Australian Air Force.
