= Bobby Byers =

Australian rules footballer

Personal information
- Full name: Robert George Byers
- Born: 18 April 1871; Ballarat, Victoria
- Died: 17 December 1952 (aged 81); Caulfield, Victoria
- Original team: Fremantle

Playing career^{1}
Years	Club	Games (Goals)
1901	Essendon	1 (0)
- ^{1} Playing statistics correct to the end of 1901.

Robert George Byers (18 April 1871 – 17 December 1952) was an Australian rules footballer who played with Essendon in the Victorian Football League (VFL).
