= Clem Michael =

Australian rules footballer

Personal information
- Full name: Clem Anthony Michael
- Born: 16 July 1976 (age 50)
- Original team: South Fremantle (WAFL)
- Debut: Round 1, 29 March 1998, Fremantle vs. Melbourne, at MCG
- Height: 192 cm (6 ft 4 in)
- Weight: 98 kg (216 lb)

Playing career^{1}
Years	Club	Games (Goals)
1998–2000	Fremantle	43 (11)
- ^{1} Playing statistics correct to the end of 2000.

Career highlights
- 1999 Fremantle Football Club Beacon Award; 1997 South Fremantle Football Club WAFL Premiership

Clem Anthony Michael (born 16 July 1976) is a former Australian Rules football player in the Australian Football League for the Fremantle Football Club from 1998 to 2000. The son of WAFL legend Stephen Michael, Clem was drafted by Fremantle in the 1997 National Draft with selection 21 after playing a key role in South Fremantle's 1997 WAFL Premiership side.

After 43 games over 3 seasons, Michael's career was cut short by a serious knee injury, which caused him to retire at the end of the 2001 season. He had an experimental surgery on the knee, in which new cartilage was grown in Scandinavia from a culture of his own cartilage. He remained on Fremantle's list for the 2002 season, and returned to train with South Fremantle but never played football again.

== Legal action ==
After first indicating that legal action could be raised in 2002, Michael filed an action against the Fremantle Football Club doctor Ken Withers in January 2006 claiming that inappropriate medical treatment caused a permanent loss of function of the left knee and continued pain and disability. The case is to be heard in the Fremantle District Court. The main claim for negligence surrounds the treatment received following a fall in the Round 4, 2000 game against Richmond which tore the left posterior cruciate ligament. Michael missed the following two matches before playing the remaining 16 matches in the season with the assistance of local anaesthesia and hydrocortisone injections. Michael claims that these injections were excessive and have resulted in permanent loss of function of the left knee.
