= Gary Dhurrkay =

Australian rules footballer

Personal information
- Full name: Gary Daywarru Dhurrkay
- Born: 4 March 1974; Northern Territory
- Died: 21 August 2005 (aged 31); Arnhem Land, Northern Territory
- Original team: East Fremantle
- Draft: pre-draft selection, 1995, Fremantle

Playing career^{1}
Years	Club	Games (Goals)
1994–1998	East Fremantle Football Club	46 (59)
1995–98	Fremantle	51 (46)
1999–2000	Kangaroos	21 (20)
2000	South Fremantle Football Club	4 (5)
Total		123 (130)
- ^{1} Playing statistics correct to the end of 2000.

Career highlights
- East Fremantle premiership side 1994 1998

Gary Daywarru Dhurrkay (4 March 1974 – 21 August 2005) was an Australian rules footballer and Aboriginal Australian community leader.

Dhurkkay was a part of the East Fremantle Football Club 1994 premiership in the WAFL. He then played for Fremantle in its 1995 inaugural AFL season.

In 1998, he was relegated back to the WAFL (known as "Westar Rules" during the period 1997-2001) for much of the year and played in the East Fremantle Football Club 1998 premiership. At the end of the season he was delisted by Fremantle.

The North Melbourne AFL Kangaroos gave him a second chance when they selected him at #31 in the 1998 AFL draft. Dhurrkay played 21 games in the 1999 and 2000 seasons at North Melbourne Football Club. He retired in mid-2000 to focus on his Aboriginal cultural beliefs and became a leader of the Marngarr community in Arnhem Land, Northern Territory.

At about 5am on 21 August 2005, Dhurkkay died in a car accident on Melville Bay Road, Arnhem Land, NT when his car rolled over and he was thrown from the vehicle. He was 31 years of age at the time of his death.
