= Derek Shaw (footballer) =

Australian rules footballer

Personal information
- Full name: Derek Shaw
- Born: 3 March 1959 (age 67)
- Original team: Bundoora
- Height: 194 cm (6 ft 4 in)
- Weight: 89 kg (196 lb)
- Position: Ruckman/Forward

Playing career^{1}
Years	Club	Games (Goals)
1978–79, 1981–84	Collingwood	47 (32)
- ^{1} Playing statistics correct to the end of 1984.

Derek Shaw (born 3 March 1959) is a former Australian rules footballer who played with Collingwood in the Victorian Football League (VFL) during the late 1970s and early 1980s.

Shaw, who could play as both a ruckman and forward, came from Bundoora originally. He made his debut at Collingwood in 1978 and the following season kicked 21 goals to earn a spot in their losing Grand Final team.
