= Jon Dorotich =

Australian rules footballer and television commentator

Personal information
- Full name: Jonathan Michael Dorotich
- Born: 27 April 1962 (age 64)
- Original team: South Fremantle
- Height: 193 cm (6 ft 4 in)
- Weight: 98 kg (216 lb)

Playing career^{1}
Years	Club	Games (Goals)
1981–1985, 1994–1997	South Fremantle	148 (454)
1986–1993	Carlton	132 (103)
Total		280 (557)
- ^{1} Playing statistics correct to the end of 1993.

Career highlights
- VFL Premiership player: (1987); WAFL Premiership player: (1997); WJ Hughes Medal: (1985); 2× Bernie Naylor Medal: (1996, 1997); Simpson Medal: (1997); South Fremantle Hall of Fame, inducted 2015

Jonathan Michael Dorotich (born 27 April 1962) is a former Australian rules footballer who played for the Carlton Football Club in the Australian Football League (AFL) and for the South Fremantle Football Club in the West Australian Football League (WAFL).

Known as "Doro", he moved to Carlton in 1986 where he played in the grand final in his first season against Hawthorn. In the following year's grand final, he played at full-forward in the rematch with Hawthorn, in which Carlton won the premiership.

He played in 132 games for Carlton before returning to Western Australia, where he co-captained South Fremantle in their 1997 WAFL premiership win. He played 148 games with the Bulldogs, and won the best and fairest award in 1985. He won the Bernie Naylor Medal as the WAFL's leading goalscorer twice, in 1996 (with 88 goals) and 107 the following year. His height was 193 cm and his weight was 103 kg.

Dorotich holds the record for the fewest disposals in a VFL/AFL match in which a player received Brownlow Medal votes, receiving two votes in a 1992 match in which he had only three disposals. In this game against St Kilda, Tony Lockett had kicked 6 goals in the first 45 minutes, before Dorotich was moved onto him and held Lockett goalless for the remainder of the match.

Dorotich also played six State Of Origin football games for Western Australia, winning the 1997 Simpson Medal against Tasmania where he kicked ten goals, as well as 17 pre-season games (three for South Fremantle and 14 for Carlton) where he kicked 21 goals (five for South Fremantle and 16 for Carlton), giving Dorotich a total of 303 career senior matches and 588 career senior goals.

Since retiring from playing, he has been a commentator for the ABC television's coverage of the WAFL.
