= Brady Anderson (footballer) =

Australian rules footballer (born 1975)

Personal information
- Born: 12 June 1975 (age 51)
- Original teams: East Perth, (WAFL)
- Debut: Round 1, 1998, North Melbourne vs. West Coast, at MCG
- Height: 181 cm (5 ft 11 in)
- Weight: 77 kg (170 lb)
- Position: midfield

Playing career^{1}
Years	Club	Games (Goals)
1995, 1997	East Perth	32 (21)
1996	Geelong	0 (0)
1998–2000	North Melbourne	27 (2)
2003–2004	Swan Districts	31 (10)
- ^{1} Playing statistics correct to the end of 2004.

Career highlights
- Night Premiership 1998; Sandover Medal 1997

Brady Anderson (born 12 June 1975) is a former Australian rules footballer who played for North Melbourne in the AFL.

Anderson started his career at East Perth where recruited by Geelong in the 1995 AFL draft, but returned to East Perth in 1997, where he won the Sandover Medal. He was then recruited by North Melbourne in the Pre-season draft. He made his debut in the opening round of the 1998 season against West Coast at the MCG. Anderson remained with North Melbourne for three seasons before returning to Perth to play for Swan Districts.

After retiring as a player Anderson became a health consultant focusing on body movement.
