= David Hynes =

Australian rules footballer (born 1967)

Personal information
- Full name: David Thomas Hynes
- Born: 31 March 1967 (age 59)
- Draft: No. 24, 1988 national draft
- Debut: Round 1, 1991, West Coast vs. Melbourne, at Subiaco Oval
- Height: 190 cm (6 ft 3 in)
- Weight: 91 kg (201 lb)

Playing career^{1}
| Years | Club | Games (Goals) |
| 1985–1990 | Port Adelaide (SANFL) | 121 (115) |
| 1991–1998 | South Fremantle (WAFL) | 62 (27) |
| 1991–1995 | West Coast | 73 (55) |
| 1996–1997 | Fremantle | 13 (4) |
| Total | | 269 (201) |
- ^{1} Playing statistics correct to the end of 1998.

Career highlights
- Port Adelaide premiership player 1988, 1989, 1990; Fos Williams Medal 1992, South Australia vs. Victoria; West Coast premiership player 1994; South Fremantle premiership player 1997; Simpson Medal 1997

David Thomas Hynes (born 31 March 1967) is a former Australian rules footballer who played for the West Coast Eagles and Fremantle Football Club in the Australian Football League (AFL) between 1991 and 1997.

Hynes attended Rostrevor College, he started his career at South Australian National Football League (SANFL) club Port Adelaide and was recruited by West Coast with pick 24 in the 1988 VFL Draft. He chose to remain with Port Adelaide for a time, playing in their 1988, 1989 and 1990 SANFL Premiership teams before making his AFL debut with the Eagles in Round 1, 1991 AFL season. From 1992 to 1995 he played finals football every year, including West Coast's 1994 AFL Grand Final win over Geelong.

Hynes was a versatile player who was used as a key defender, key forward or ruckman. Hynes crossed to rival club Fremantle in 1996 and spent two seasons with the club. When not selected by Fremantle during this time he represented South Fremantle in the West Australian Football League (WAFL) and was a member of their 1997 premiership team, winning the Simpson Medal for the best player in the Grand Final.

== Statistics ==
Legend
| G | Goals | K | Kicks | D | Disposals | T | Tackles |
| B | Behinds | H | Handballs | M | Marks | H/O | Hit-outs |

| Season | Team | No. | Games | Totals | | | | | | | | Averages (per game) | | | | | | | | Votes |
| Season | Team | No. | Games | G | B | K | H | D | M | T | H/O | G | B | K | H | D | M | T | H/O | Votes |
|---|---|---|---|---|---|---|---|---|---|---|---|---|---|---|---|---|---|---|---|---|
| 1991 | West Coast | 22 | 9 | 4 | 7 | 56 | 55 | 111 | 19 | 6 | 38 | 0.4 | 0.8 | 6.2 | 6.1 | 12.3 | 2.1 | 0.7 | 4.2 | 0 |
| 1992 | West Coast | 22 | 17 | 19 | 15 | 132 | 78 | 210 | 71 | 20 | 61 | 1.1 | 0.9 | 7.8 | 4.6 | 12.4 | 4.2 | 1.2 | 3.6 | 0 |
| 1993 | West Coast | 22 | 21 | 14 | 14 | 167 | 94 | 261 | 100 | 17 | 79 | 0.7 | 0.7 | 8.0 | 4.5 | 12.4 | 4.8 | 0.8 | 3.8 | 0 |
| 1994† | West Coast | 22 | 13 | 12 | 10 | 94 | 57 | 151 | 54 | 10 | 90 | 0.9 | 0.8 | 7.2 | 4.4 | 11.6 | 4.2 | 0.8 | 6.9 | 0 |
| 1995 | West Coast | 22 | 13 | 6 | 2 | 66 | 48 | 114 | 36 | 8 | 43 | 0.5 | 0.2 | 5.1 | 3.7 | 8.8 | 2.8 | 0.6 | 3.3 | 2 |
| 1996 | Fremantle | 16 | 12 | 4 | 3 | 118 | 59 | 177 | 51 | 12 | 41 | 0.3 | 0.3 | 9.8 | 4.9 | 14.8 | 4.3 | 1.0 | 3.4 | 0 |
| 1997 | Fremantle | 16 | 1 | 0 | 0 | 3 | 1 | 4 | 1 | 0 | 3 | 0.0 | 0.0 | 3.0 | 1.0 | 4.0 | 1.0 | 0.0 | 3.0 | 0 |
| Career | | | 86 | 59 | 51 | 636 | 392 | 1028 | 332 | 73 | 355 | 0.7 | 0.6 | 7.4 | 4.6 | 12.0 | 3.9 | 0.8 | 4.1 | 2 |

== See also ==
1990 SANFL Grand Final
