= Greg Madigan =

Australian rules footballer

Personal information
- Born: 24 January 1970 (age 56)
- Original team: Marcellin College
- Debut: Round 11, 1989, Hawthorn vs. Melbourne, at Princes Park
- Height: 195 cm (6 ft 5 in)
- Weight: 92 kg (203 lb)

Playing career^{1}
Years	Club	Games (Goals)
1989–1994	Hawthorn	40 (4)
1995–1997	Fremantle	26 (2)
1995–1997	Swan Districts	21 (18)
1998	East Fremantle	19 (2)
Total		106 (26)
- ^{1} Playing statistics correct to the end of 1997.

Career highlights
- Hawthorn premiership player: 1989; East Fremantle premiership player: 1998

Greg Madigan (born 24 January 1970) is a former Australian rules footballer who played for Hawthorn and Fremantle in the Australian Football League (AFL) during the 1990s.

Playing mostly at centre half-back, Madigan was a member of Hawthorn's 1989 VFL Grand Final winning side, in only his 6th league game. However, in the subsequent years he failed to establish his position in the Hawthorn team, playing ten or fewer games in each of his six seasons at Hawthorn.

In 1995 he was selected into the inaugural Fremantle Dockers squad with the second selection in the preseason draft. As one of the few players with AFL experience in the new expansion team, he managed the best season of his career, playing in 18 games. He remained with Fremantle for two more seasons, but struggled to keep his place, playing only 4 games in each of 1996 and 1997.

When not playing for Fremantle, he represented East Fremantle in the West Australian Football League.
