= Troy Wilson (Australian rules footballer) =

Australian rules footballer (born 1972)

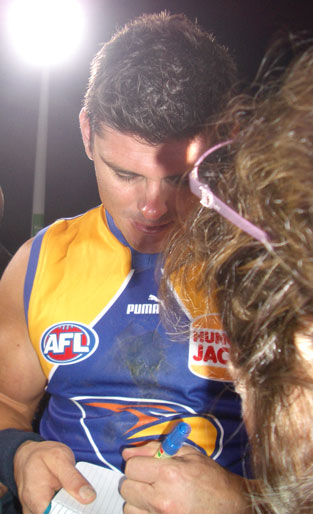
- Wilson after the 2008 Chris Mainwaring Tribute Match

Personal information
- Full name: Troy Maxwell Wilson
- Born: 19 January 1972 (age 54)
- Original team: Nollamara
- Debut: Round 1, 2001, West Coast Eagles vs. Geelong, at Kardinia Park
- Height: 189 cm (6 ft 2 in)
- Weight: 100 kg (220 lb)

Playing career^{1}
Years	Club	Games (Goals)
1996–1999	West Perth	80 (101)
2000–2006	East Perth	78 (252)
2001–2003	West Coast Eagles	37 (83)
1996–2000	Western Australia	3 (0)
Total		198 (436)
- ^{1} Playing statistics correct to the end of 2006.

Career highlights
- West Coast leading goalkicker 2001; West Perth premiership player 1999; East Perth premiership player 2000; East Perth leading goalkicker 2004, 2006; East Perth best and fairest 2004, 2006; Bernie Naylor Medal 2006

Troy Maxwell Wilson (born 19 January 1972) is a speedway driver and former Australian rules footballer. Wilson played for West Coast in the Australian Football League (AFL), and for West Perth and East Perth in the West Australian Football League (WAFL).

== Football career ==
Wilson's football career was notable not merely for his on-field achievements but his late start. He attempted to get into professional football at an earlier age but shin splints prevented him coping with the physical demands. Instead he played amateur football with Nollamara until West Perth were prepared to give him a chance. Wilson made his debut for West Perth at the late age of 24. His preferred position was as a defender but he also showed prowess as a full-forward. Wilson was famous for his uncompromising manner of play. His attacks on the ball from full-forward led to medical treatment for many of his opponents, most notably North Melbourne full-back Mick Martyn. After winning a premiership with West Perth, he crossed to arch-rivals East Perth in 2000 where he played the season as a full-forward and helped the side end a 22-year premiership drought.

Wilson's efforts saw him picked up by the West Coast Eagles in the pre-season draft at the age of 28 – unheard of in modern times. He would turn 29 before the start of the season. While the West Coast Eagles finished fourteenth on the AFL ladder, Wilson had a solid debut season in which he played eighteen games and kicked 40 goals to be the club's leading goalkicker. Wilson began 2002 in strong form before a collarbone injury followed by calf and hamstring problems curtailed his season. Nevertheless, he was able to kick five goals in Round 22 to help the Eagles scrape a place in the finals. However in 2003 he managed only five AFL games and was subsequently delisted.

Upon his return to the WAFL in 2004, Wilson won the F.D. Book Medal as East Perth's fairest and best player, and was also the club's leading goalkicker. Three games into the 2005 season, Wilson announced his retirement from all forms of football after playing 141 WAFL league games and 37 AFL games over ten years, citing chronic injuries and an inability to recover after matches. Wilson resumed training with East Perth in January 2006. He began the season playing in reserves, before being recalled to the league team in Round 2. In round 9 against Peel Thunder, Wilson came to form kicking nine goals, backing up his six goals from the week before.

Wilson played his 150th WAFL league match in Round 12, celebrating the milestone with a seven-goal haul in a victory over East Fremantle. The following week, Wilson kicked eleven goals in East Perth's upset win over Claremont, becoming the first Royal to kick a bag of ten or more goals in a game since 1996. With three rounds remaining, Wilson revealed that 2006 would be his last season for East Perth owing to a major back problem that allowed him to train only one night per week. He finished the season with 74 goals, including six in the final round to be awarded the Bernie Naylor Medal as the leading goalkicker in the WAFL. He also won his second F.D. Book Medal.

== Motorsport career ==
Wilson's enjoyment of motorsport began in his youth with dirt-bikes. His first race was Motorcross in 1987. He competed in the 80cc, 100cc and 125cc Motor Cross WA State Titles where he consistently placed in the top three. In 1988, he placed third in the Australian National Title 125cc Motor Cross.

Wilson embarked on a career in motorsports while continuing to play WAFL football for East Perth. He began racing late model sedans, placing first in the 2002 WA Sports Sedan Endurance Series Race, before moving onto sprintcars and gaining publicity for his spectacular "bingles" in his first season but improving thereafter.

Wilson competed in the Targa West Rally in 2007, 2008, 2010 and 2011. He captained the Australian team in the USA vs Australia Monster Trucks Challenge at Perth Motorplex in 2010. He was scheduled to race in the Porsche City Index Carrera Cup in May 2012, but couldn't continue due to a licensing problem. He is now preparing for the 2013 Porsche Carrera Cup Australia season.
