= Scott Spalding =

Australian rules footballer

Personal information
- Full name: Scott Spalding
- Born: 2 September 1968 (age 58)
- Original team: Perth
- Draft: 118th overall, 1992 AFL draft
- Height: 184 cm (6 ft 0 in)
- Weight: 81 kg (179 lb)
- Position: Forward flank

Playing career^{1}
Years	Club	Games (Goals)
1993	Carlton	1 (0)
- ^{1} Playing statistics correct to the end of 1993.

Career highlights
- SANFL premiership player, 1994; WAFL premiership player, 1998

Scott Spalding (born 2 September 1968) is a former Australian rules footballer who played with Carlton in the Australian Football League (AFL). Originally from Perth in the West Australian Football League (WAFL), Spalding returned to his former club after only one season with the Blues, and another with Port Adelaide in the SANFL, where he played in a premiership and won the Most Consistent Trophy for the Magpies. He later moved to play with East Fremantle, another WAFL club. In 1998, he won a WAFL premiership with East Fremantle, playing alongside his brother, Earl Spalding, also a former Carlton player.

He attended school at Wesley College in South Perth.
