= Leigh Willison =

Australian rules footballer

Personal information
- Full name: Leigh Matthew Willison
- Born: 14 October 1969 (age 57)
- Original team: East Perth
- Height: 188 cm (6 ft 2 in)
- Weight: 83 kg (183 lb)

Playing career^{1}
Years	Club	Games (Goals)
1993	Geelong	3 (4)
1994	East Perth	17 (?)
1995–2002	East Fremantle	122 (170)

Representative team honours
Years	Team	Games (Goals)
1998	Western Australia	1 (0)
- ^{1} Playing statistics correct to the end of 2002.

Career highlights
- 1998 WAFL Premiership player

Leigh Matthew Willison (born 14 October 1969) is a former Australian rules football player. Willison played for Geelong in the Australian Football League (AFL) as well as East Perth and East Fremantle in the West Australian Football League (WAFL).

== Playing career ==
Willison played three matches for Geelong during the 1993 AFL season. He played one season for East Perth in 1994 before joining East Fremantle the following year. Between 1995 and 2002 he played 122 WAFL matches for the Sharks, including the 1998 premiership-winning Sharks team.

In 1998 Willison played one match for Western Australia against South Australia.
