= Earl Spalding =

Personal information
- Full name: Earl George Spalding
- Born: 11 March 1965 (age 61); South Perth, Western Australia
- Original team: Wesley College / Perth
- Height: 198 cm (6 ft 6 in)
- Weight: 110 kg (243 lb)

Playing career^{1}
Years	Club	Games (Goals)
1983–1986	Perth	63 (79)
1987–1991	Melbourne	109 (63)
1992–1997	Carlton	102 (106)
1998–1999	East Fremantle	32 (41)
Total		306 (279)
- ^{1} Playing statistics correct to the end of 1999.

Career highlights
- Carlton premiership player 1995; East Fremantle premiership player 1998

Earl George Spalding (born 11 March 1965) is a former Australian rules footballer who played for Melbourne and Carlton in the Victorian Football League/Australian Football League (VFL/AFL), as well as for Perth and East Fremantle in the West Australian Football League. He is known as "the Duke" or "Snake" because of his unusual running style, and also the "golf ball" in reference to his surname.

Spalding grew up in Perth, Western Australia, where he attended Wesley College. His father, George Spalding, was a well-known West Australian National Football League (WANFL) player with the Perth Football Club.

After leaving school, Spalding played for 63 games for Perth between 1983 and 1986, reaching the preliminary final in 1986. He also played four games of first-class cricket for Western Australia as a fast bowler, during the 1984/85 season, taking 12 wickets at an average of 25.66.

He started his VFL/AFL career with Melbourne and was there from 1987 to 1991, playing 109 games. The following season he signed with Carlton and played all 22 games for the year. He played in a premiership with Carlton in 1995, a year in which he played all 25 games and brought up his 250th game of elite Australian rules football, and in 1996 played his 200th game in the VFL/AFL.

He played his last senior AFL game in 1997 before returning to Western Australia to play for East Fremantle alongside his brother Scott, who also played one game for Carlton in 1993. Earl played 32 games over the next two seasons, including their 1998 WAFL Premiership winning team, and retired at the end of the 1999 season, having played 306 games across the WAFL and VFL/AFL.

Spalding was the reserves and assistant coach at East Fremantle in 2000 before becoming the league coach in 2001. He resigned from the position at the end of the 2002 season, and since then has working with the Fremantle Football Club as an assistant coach.

Spalding was appointed senior coach of the Perth Demons Football Club in 2015. With an extremely young list and a deliberate policy not to recruit extensively so that the young players could develop, Perth won only two games in 2015. In 2016, the team has won six of its first 14 games, including a victory over top team Subiaco.

== Statistics ==
Legend
G	Goals	K	Kicks	D	Disposals	T	Tackles
B	Behinds	H	Handballs	M	Marks	H/O	Hit-outs

Season	Team	No.	Games	Totals								Averages (per game)								Votes
Season	Team	No.	Games	G	B	K	H	D	M	T	H/O	G	B	K	H	D	M	T	H/O	Votes
1987	Melbourne	35	24	6	5	188	97	285	75	21	35	0.3	0.2	7.8	4.0	11.9	3.1	0.9	1.5	5
1988	Melbourne	5	22	9	22	161	72	233	71	24	8	0.4	1.0	7.3	3.3	10.6	3.2	1.1	0.4	1
1989	Melbourne	5	19	19	22	190	97	287	103	16	23	1.0	1.2	10.0	5.1	15.1	5.4	0.8	1.2	8
1990	Melbourne	5	22	15	9	186	108	294	85	24	22	0.7	0.4	8.5	4.9	13.4	3.9	1.1	1.0	3
1991	Melbourne	5	22	14	10	199	136	335	111	20	20	0.6	0.5	9.0	6.2	15.2	5.0	0.9	0.9	0
1992	Carlton	11	22	19	23	206	120	326	95	21	21	0.9	1.0	9.4	5.5	14.8	4.3	1.0	1.0	6
1993	Carlton	11	21	23	22	170	110	280	88	16	12	1.1	1.0	8.1	5.2	13.3	4.2	0.8	0.6	2
1994	Carlton	11	18	12	17	123	121	244	79	25	14	0.7	0.9	6.8	6.7	13.6	4.4	1.4	0.8	0
1995†	Carlton	11	25	34	22	213	164	377	127	35	50	1.4	0.9	8.5	6.6	15.1	5.1	1.4	2.0	8
1996	Carlton	11	12	18	10	85	50	135	37	26	10	1.5	0.8	7.1	4.2	11.3	3.1	2.2	0.8	0
1997	Carlton	11	4	0	1	26	13	39	14	5	3	0.0	0.3	6.5	3.3	9.8	3.5	1.3	0.8	0
Career			211	169	163	1747	1088	2835	885	233	218	0.8	0.8	8.3	5.2	13.4	4.2	1.1	1.0	33
