= 2022 WAFL season =

Premier Western Australia Australian Rules competition

- Teams: 10
- Premiers: West Perth; 20th premiership
- Minor premiers: West Perth; 10th minor premiership
- Sandover Medallist: Blaine Boekhorst (East Fremantle)
- Bernie Naylor Medallist: Ben Sokol; Subiaco (41 goals)
- Highest: 16,791 (Grand Final, West Perth vs Claremont)

The 2022 WAFL season is the 138th season of the various incarnations of the West Australian Football League (WAFL).The season commenced on the 15th of April, and concluded with the Grand Final on the 1st of October, with West Perth defeating Claremont at Leederville Oval by 12 points. Fixtures were released in stages, to allow for COVID flexibility. The first stage saw the first nine rounds of the season be released, rounds 10-14 were released before the start of Round 7 (3 June), and the final rounds (14–20) were released on July 8, before the start of Round 12. All the teams from the previous season have been retained, as there was speculation if the West Coast Eagles reserves would return.

== Clubs ==
Club	Home ground	Location	2021 season
Claremont	Revo Fitness Stadium	Claremont	13-5 (Preliminary Final)
East Fremantle	The WACA	East Perth	8-10 (DNQ Finals)
East Perth	Leederville Oval	Leederville	6-12 (DNQ Finals)
Peel Thunder	Lane Group Stadium	Mandurah	6-12 (DNQ Finals)
Perth	Mineral Resources Park	Lathlain	4-14 (DNQ Finals)
South Fremantle	Fremantle Community Bank Oval	Fremantle	13-5 (Runners Up)
Subiaco	Leederville Oval	Leederville	14-4 (Premiers)
Swan Districts	Steel Blue Oval	Bassendean	10-8 (Finals Week 1)
West Coast	Mineral Resources Park	Lathlain	4-14 (Wooden Spoon)
West Perth	Pentanet Stadium	Joondalup	12-6 (Finals Week 2)

== Fixtures ==
=== Round 1 ===
	Round 1
Friday 15 April (2:10 pm)	West Perth 8.13 (61)	def. by	Claremont 9.11 (65)	Pentanet Stadium (crowd: 2,342)
Friday 15 April (2:10 pm)	East Perth 12.7 (79)	def.	Swan Districts 11.9 (75)	Leederville Oval (crowd: 2,304)
Friday 15 April (4:10 pm)	Peel Thunder 17.8 (110)	def.	East Fremantle 11.12 (78)	Lane Group Stadium (crowd: 1,486)
Saturday 16 April (2:10 pm)	Perth 9.8 (62)	def.	West Coast 8.12 (60)	Mineral Resources Park (crowd: 1,355)
Saturday 16 April (2:10 pm)	Subiaco 6.11 (47)	def. by	South Fremantle 8.7 (55)	Leederville Oval (crowd: 2,098)

=== Round 2 ===
	Round 2
Saturday 23 April (1:10 pm)	South Fremantle 17.14 (116)	def.	West Coast 6.4 (40)	Fremantle Community Bank Oval (crowd: 1,380)
Saturday 23 April (2:00 pm)	Swan Districts 12.8 (80)	def. by	East Fremantle 13.11 (89)	Steel Blue Oval (crowd: 1,332)
Saturday 23 April (2:10 pm)	Claremont 13.11 (89)	def.	Subiaco 11.8 (74)	Revo Fitness Stadium (crowd: 1,585)
Sunday 24 April (2:10 pm)	Peel Thunder 14.9 (93)	def. by	West Perth 16.8 (104)	Lane Group Stadium (crowd: 2,300)
Sunday 24 April (5:10 pm)	Perth 6.13 (49)	def. by	East Perth 20.10 (130)	Mineral Resources Park (crowd: 2,081)

=== Round 3 ===
	Round 3
Saturday 30 April (1:30 pm)	East Fremantle 13.13 (91)	def.	East Perth 12.9 (81)	Northampton Community Oval (crowd: 2,700)
Saturday 30 April (2:10 pm)	Subiaco 10.9 (69)	def. by	West Perth 16.4 (100)	Leederville Oval (crowd: 2,154)
Saturday 30 April (2:10 pm)	South Fremantle 8.11 (59)	def. by	Claremont 10.10 (70)	Fremantle Community Bank Oval (crowd: 1,921)
Saturday 30 April (2:10 pm)	West Coast 10.5 (65)	def. by	Peel Thunder 19.6 (120)	Mineral Resources Park (crowd: 2,010)
Saturday 30 April (5:10 pm)	Perth 10.13 (73)	def. by	Swan Districts 12.6 (78)	Mineral Resources Park (crowd: 2,010)
The East Fremantle vs East Perth game was played for the Seroja Cup won by East Fremantle. Cameron Eardley was adjudged best on ground with his 40 disposal effort in the win. See also: Cyclone Seroja

=== Round 4 ===
	Round 4
Saturday 7 May (2:10 pm)	Swan Districts 11.14 (80)	def.	Claremont 10.11 (71)	Steel Blue Oval (crowd: 1,463)
Saturday 7 May (2:10 pm)	East Perth 12.11 (83)	def. by	Subiaco 12.12 (84)	Leederville Oval (crowd: 1,756)
Saturday 7 May(2:10 pm)	Peel Thunder 13.9 (87)	def. by	Perth 13.10 (88)	Lane Group Stadium (crowd: 763)
Saturday 7 May (2:10 pm)	West Perth 9.9 (63)	def.	South Fremantle 8.7 (55)	Pentanet Stadium (crowd: 1,611)
Saturday 14 May (2:00 pm)	East Fremantle 22.14 (146)	def.	West Coast 3.5 (23)	New Choice Homes Park (crowd: 1,115)
The East Fremantle vs West Coast game was postponed a week due to the COVID crisis experienced by the AFL West Coast side, meaning not enough players were able to take the field for the WAFL West Coast side. In the end, the game was West Coast's second biggest loss in the clubs WAFL history (123 points), only behind last years game against the same opponent, where they lost by 125 points. It was also the clubs second (at the time, now third) lowest score, and third highest score conceded. Jye Bolton with his career high 51 disposal game, became only the second player in WAFL history (after Shane Nelson) to notch 2 games with over 50 disposals, and only the 10th instance of a 50 disposal game overall.

=== State Game ===
WAFL vs SANFL State Game
Sunday, 15 May (12:00 pm)	Western Australia	def. by	South Australia	Optus Stadium
2.4 (16); 3.9 (33); 6.10 (46); 9.12 (66)	Q1; Q2; Q3; Final	4.1 (25); 7.2 (44); 8.5 (53); 10.10 (70)
Rogers 3 Knott, Sokol 2 Florenca, Keitel 1	Goals	Menzel, Williams 2 Ballenden, Carmichael, McBean, O'Neill, Ramsey, Rokhahr 1
Kitchin, Eardley, Pegararo, Harris, Rogers, Turner, Schumacher, Florenca	Best	Voss, Knight, Wigg, Allen, Combe, Ramsey, Williams
Nil	Injuries	Nil
Nil	Reports	Nil

=== Round 5 ===
	Round 5
Saturday 21 May (12:10 pm)	Subiaco 12.10 (82)	def.	Swan Districts 10.8 (68)	Sir Richard Moore Oval (crowd: 800)
Saturday 21 May (2:10 pm)	Claremont 14.13 (97)	def.	East Perth 7.8 (50)	Revo Fitness Stadium (crowd: 2,014)
Saturday 21 May(2:10 pm)	South Fremantle 13.11 (89)	def.	Peel Thunder 9.9 (63)	Fremantle Community Bank Oval (crowd: 1,977)
Saturday 21 May (2:10 pm)	West Perth 17.17 (119)	def.	West Coast 6.2 (38)	Pentanet Stadium (crowd: 1,132)
Saturday 21 May (2:00 pm)	Perth 10.12 (72)	def. by	East Fremantle 13.20 (98)	Mineral Resources Park (crowd: 1,443)

=== Round 6 ===
	Round 6
Saturday 28 May (11:40 am)	Peel Thunder 12.12 (84)	def.	Claremont 9.8 (62)	Lane Group Stadium (crowd: 1,439)
Saturday 28 May (1:30 pm)	East Perth 18.10 (118)	def.	West Coast 6.4 (40)	Leederville Oval (crowd: 959)
Saturday 28 May(2:10 pm)	East Fremantle 13.12 (90)	def.	Subiaco 6.10 (46)	WACA (crowd: 1,539)
Saturday 28 May (2:10 pm)	West Perth 7.12 (54)	def.	Perth 7.6 (48)	Pentanet Stadium (crowd: 1,251)
Saturday 28 May (2:10 pm)	Swan Districts 9.10 (64)	def.	South Fremantle 8.7 (55)	Steel Blue Oval (crowd: 1,587)
West Coast with their embarrassing 78 point loss against East Perth lost their 10th consecutive game, the longest in the clubs WAFL history, and their first 10+ game WAFL losing streak. It would eventually stretch to 14 games.; Mitchell Dobson kicked a goal after the siren to give West Perth the win in a grandstand finish over Perth.

=== Round 7 ===
	Round 7
Saturday 4 June (2:10 pm)	Subiaco 10.8 (68)	def. by	Peel Thunder 11.8 (74)	Leederville Oval (crowd: 2,899)
Saturday 4 June (2:10 pm)	East Perth 16.6 (102)	def.	Perth 11.2 (68)	Revo Fitness Stadium (crowd: 1,828)
Saturday 4 June(2:10 pm)	Swan Districts 11.11 (77)	def.	West Coast 8.9 (57)	Steel Blue Oval (crowd: 1,814)
Monday 6 June (2:10 pm)	West Perth 9.8 (62)	def.	East Perth 7.6 (48)	Pentanet Stadium (crowd: 3,987)
Monday 6 June (2:40 pm)	South Fremantle 11.15 (81)	def.	East Fremantle 12.7 (79)	Fremantle Community Bank Oval (crowd: 6,023)

=== Round 8 ===
	Round 8
Saturday 11 June (11:10 am)	Claremont 13.10 (88)	def.	West Coast 7.8 (50)	Revo Fitness Stadium (crowd: 1,061)
Saturday 11 June (2:10 pm)	Swan Districts 12.6 (78)	def.	Peel Thunder 11.8 (74)	Steel Blue Oval (crowd: 1,084)
Saturday 11 June(2:10 pm)	Perth 10.7 (67)	def. by	Subiaco 12.9 (81)	Mineral Resources Park (crowd: 1,182)
Saturday 11 June (2:10 pm)	East Fremantle 13.12 (90)	def.	West Perth 12.16 (88)	WACA (crowd: 1,565)
Sunday 12 June (2:40 pm)	East Perth 6.10 (46)	def. by	South Fremantle 8.9 (57)	Leederville Oval (crowd: 1,250)
In a somewhat bizarre finish, Christopher Jones from Swan Districts kicks the ball over his head for his 5th, and for the winning goal against Peel Thunder, which some believe actually hit the post before being scooped up by Jones.

=== Round 9 ===
	Round 9
Saturday 18 June (11:05 am)	West Coast 8.14 (62)	def. by	Subiaco 14.6 (90)	Optus Stadium
Saturday 18 June (2:10 pm)	East Fremantle 11.13 (79)	def. by	Claremont 14.11 (95)	WACA (crowd: 1,412)
Saturday 18 June(2:10 pm)	Peel Thunder 18.9 (117)	def.	East Perth 7.10 (52)	Lane Group Stadium (crowd: 864)
Saturday 18 June (2:10 pm)	West Perth 10.8 (68)	def.	Swan Districts 7.8 (50)	Arena Joondalup (crowd: 1,203)
Saturday 18 June (2:10 pm)	South Fremantle 12.12 (84)	def.	Perth 6.9 (45)	Fremantle Community Bank Oval (crowd: 1,240)

=== Round 10 ===
	Round 10
Saturday 25 June (2:10 pm)	East Fremantle 12.16 (88)	def.	Peel Thunder 12.5 (77)	WACA (crowd: 1,162)
Saturday 25 June (2:10 pm)	Swan Districts 16.8 (104)	def.	Subiaco 7.11 (53)	Steel Blue Oval (crowd: 1,530)
Saturday 25 June(2:10 pm)	East Perth 10.12 (72)	def.	Claremont 6.10 (46)	Leederville Oval (crowd: 1,664)
Saturday 25 June (2:10 pm)	Perth 7.9 (51)	def. by	West Perth 17.10 (112)	Mineral Resources Park (crowd: 2,337)
Saturday 25 June (5:00 pm)	West Coast 13.12 (90)	def.	South Fremantle 7.7 (49)	Mineral Resources Park (crowd: 2,337)
West Coast footballer Harry Edwards took 23 marks in their win over South Fremantle, tying the all time record for most marks by an individual in a game.

=== Round 12 ===
	Round 12
Saturday 9 July (1:40 pm)	Swan Districts 9.11 (65)	def.	Perth 7.6 (48)	Steel Blue Oval (crowd: 1,613)
Saturday 9 July (2:10 pm)	Claremont 3.3 (21)	def. by	South Fremantle 7.13 (55)	Revo Fitness Stadium (crowd: 1,181)
Saturday 9 July (2:10 pm)	Subiaco 6.4 (40)	def. by	East Fremantle 9.11 (65)	Leederville Oval (crowd: 1,168)
Saturday 9 July (2:10 pm)	West Coast 4.3 (27)	def. by	East Perth 7.8 (50)	Mineral Resources Park (crowd: 1,002)
Saturday 9 July (2:10 pm)	West Perth 7.5 (47)	def.	Peel Thunder 6.8 (44)	Arena Joondalup (crowd: 1,236)
Although listed as Round 12, it is technically the 11th round of the season, as there was a common week bye for the WAFL Women's Grand Final. This will be the case for the rest of the season

=== Round 13 ===
	Round 13
Saturday 16 July (12:10 pm)	West Coast 5.6 (36)	def. by	East Fremantle 14.14 (98)	Mineral Resources Park (crowd: 449)
Saturday 16 July (2:10 pm)	Peel Thunder 10.15 (75)	def.	South Fremantle 7.7 (49)	Lane Group Stadium (crowd: 926)
Saturday 16 July (2:10 pm)	East Perth 14.17 (101)	def.	Perth 9.9 (63)	Leederville Oval (crowd: 1,476)
Saturday 16 July (2:10 pm)	Claremont 17.7 (109)	def.	West Perth 11.14 (80)	Revo Fitness Stadium (crowd: 1,389)
Saturday 16 July (2:10 pm)	South Fremantle 7.14 (56)	def.	Swan Districts 8.7 (55)	Fremantle Community Bank Oval (crowd: 1,893)

=== Round 14 ===
	Round 14
Saturday 23 July (2:10 pm)	Subiaco 4.4 (28)	def. by	Claremont 5.5 (35)	Leederville Oval (crowd: 1,001)
Saturday 23 July (2:10 pm)	Perth 7.7 (49)	def. by	Peel Thunder 11.13 (79)	Mineral Resources Park (crowd: 1,223)
Saturday 23 July (2:10 pm)	East Fremantle 5.4 (34)	def. by	South Fremantle 9.13 (67)	WACA (crowd: 1,506)
Saturday 23 July (2:20 pm)	Swan Districts 10.7 (67)	def.	East Perth 6.8 (44)	Steel Blue Oval (crowd: 1,854)
Saturday 23 July (5:00 pm)	West Coast 4.9 (33)	def. by	West Perth 12.18 (90)	Mineral Resources Park (crowd: 1,223)
Claremont's score of 35 was the lowest score they have won with since 1950 (which was 31 points), and also the second lowest in their history.

=== Round 15 ===
	Round 15
Saturday 30 July (2:10 pm)	Claremont 10.12 (72)	def.	Swan Districts 9.9 (63)	Revo Fitness Stadium (crowd: 1,303)
Saturday 30 July (2:10 pm)	East Perth 6.4 (40)	def. by	Peel Thunder 13.15 (93)	East Fremantle Oval (crowd: 861)
Saturday 30 July (2:10 pm)	East Fremantle 23.14 (152)	def.	Perth 9.2 (56)	WACA (crowd: 1,216)
Saturday 30 July (2:10 pm)	South Fremantle 9.11 (65)	drew with	West Perth 9.11 (65)	Fremantle Community Bank Oval (crowd: 1,620)
	Bye; Subiaco, West Coast
The West Perth vs. South Fremantle game was the first drawn WAFL game since June 2012, when West Perth drew against rivals East Perth on WA Day. The East Perth vs Peel Thunder game was moved from Leederville Oval to New Choice Homes Park sighting poor turf.

=== Round 16 ===
	Round 16
Saturday 6 August (2:10 pm)	Subiaco 14.6 (90)	def.	West Coast 9.13 (67)	New Choice Homes Park (crowd: 419)
Saturday 6 August (2:10 pm)	West Perth 11.10 (76)	def.	East Fremantle 5.10 (40)	Arena Joondalup (crowd: 1,457)
	Bye; Claremont, East Perth, Peel Thunder, Perth, South Fremantle, Swan Districts
The Subiaco vs. West Coast game was moved from Leederville Oval to New Choice Homes Park sighting poor turf, a continuation from the week before

=== Round 17 ===
	Round 17
Saturday 13 August (2:10 pm)	Subiaco 10.9 (69)	def.	East Perth 8.8 (56)	Leederville Oval (crowd: 1,274)
Saturday 13 August (2:10 pm)	Perth 6.5 (41)	def. by	Claremont 18.14 (122)	Mineral Resources Park (crowd: 1,022)
Saturday 13 August (2:10 pm)	Peel Thunder 10.12 (72)	def.	South Fremantle 8.10 (58)	Lane Group Stadium (crowd: 957)
Saturday 13 August (2:10 pm)	Swan Districts 13.18 (96)	def.	West Coast 1.5 (11)	Steel Blue Oval (crowd: 1,002)
	Bye; East Fremantle, West Perth
West Coast's score of 1.5 (11) is the lowest in their brief WAFL history. Not only this, but this score is also the lowest score any male team associated with the club has kicked, lowering the mark from the 1.12 (18) against Essendon way back in 1989.

=== Round 18 ===
	Round 18
Saturday 20 August (2:10 pm)	Claremont 13.11 (89)	def.	Peel Thunder 11.8 (74)	Revo Fitness Stadium (crowd: 1,405)
Saturday 20 August (2:10 pm)	East Fremantle 20.15 (135)	def.	Swan Districts 8.9 (57)	WACA (crowd: 1,846)
Saturday 20 August (2:10 pm)	East Perth 6.8 (44)	def. by	West Perth 17.12 (114)	New Choice Homes Park (crowd: 1,012)
Saturday 20 August (3:10 pm)	South Fremantle 19.18 (132)	def.	Subiaco 6.8 (44)	Fremantle Community Bank Oval (crowd: 1,736)
Saturday 20 August (5:40 pm)	Perth 13.11 (89)	def.	West Coast 6.6 (42)	Mineral Resources Park (crowd: 1,221)
Due to the poor turf conditions, the East Perth vs. West Perth game was moved. In the same game, West Perth won the Polly Farmer Shield. Claremont and the previously mentioned West Perth confirmed their spot in the top 5 due to their wins.

=== Round 19 ===
	Round 19
Saturday 27 August (2:10 pm)	Claremont 5.8 (38)	def. by	East Fremantle 11.17 (83)	Revo Fitness Stadium (crowd: 1,940)
Saturday 27 August (2:10 pm)	Subiaco 14.14 (98)	def.	Perth 4.11 (35)	Leederville Oval (crowd: 1,325)
Saturday 27 August (2:10 pm)	Peel Thunder 16.9 (105)	def.	West Coast 3.14 (32)	Lane Group Stadium (crowd: 2,518)
Saturday 27 August (2:20 pm)	Swan Districts 9.5 (59)	def.	West Perth 6.11 (47)	Steel Blue Oval (crowd: 2,417)
Sunday 28 August (2:10 pm)	South Fremantle 12.10 (82)	def.	East Perth 11.7 (73)	Fremantle Community Bank Oval (crowd: 2,125)
Swan Districts kept their finals hopes alive, defeating West Perth during the celebration of their 1982 - 1984 threepeat. East Fremantle defeating Claremont kept 2nd spot up for grabs with the Sharks needing to defeat East Perth in Round 20 to retain it.

=== Round 20 ===
	Round 20
Saturday 3 September (2:10 pm)	East Perth 3.14 (32)	def. by	East Fremantle 7.11 (53)	Leederville Oval (crowd: 1,322)
Saturday 3 September (2:10 pm)	West Perth 13.11 (89)	def.	Subiaco 5.12 (42)	Arena Joondalup (crowd: 1,497)
Saturday 3 September (2:10 pm)	Claremont 10.8 (68)	def.	West Coast 6.9 (45)	Revo Fitness Stadium (crowd: 798)
Saturday 3 September (2:10 pm)	Perth 4.4 (28)	def. by	South Fremantle 14.8 (92)	Mineral Resources Park (crowd: 1,315)
Sunday 4 September (12:10 pm)	Peel Thunder 18.20 (128)	def.	Swan Districts 5.6 (36)	Lane Group Stadium

== Ladder ==
Pos	Team	Pld	W	L	D	PF	PA	PP	Pts	Qualification
1	West Perth (P)	18	13	4	1	1439	1043	138.0	54	Finals series
2	East Fremantle	18	13	5	0	1588	1155	137.5	52	Finals series
3	Claremont	18	13	5	0	1339	1146	116.8	52	Finals series
4	South Fremantle	18	12	5	1	1307	999	130.8	50	Finals series
5	Peel Thunder	18	11	7	0	1569	1172	133.9	44	Finals series
6	Swan Districts	18	10	8	0	1252	1242	100.8	40	
7	Subiaco	18	7	11	0	1154	1346	85.7	28	
8	East Perth	18	6	12	0	1199	1286	93.2	24	
9	Perth	18	3	15	0	1032	1637	63.0	12	
10	West Coast	18	1	17	0	818	1671	49.0	4	

Source: WAFL.com.au
Rules for classification: 1) points; 2) percentage; 3) number of points for.
(P) Premiers

== Finals series ==
=== Week one ===
	Qualifying final
Saturday 10 September (1:40 pm)	East Fremantle 16.10 (106)	def.	Claremont 8.10 (58)	New Choice Homes Park (crowd: 3,104)
This was East Fremantle's first WAFL finals game since its preliminary final loss in 2014

	Elimination final
Sunday 11 September (12:10 pm)	South Fremantle 8.13 (61)	def. by	Peel Thunder 10.10 (70)	Fremantle Community Bank Oval (crowd: 3,460)

=== Week two ===
	Semi Final 1
Sunday 18 September (2:10 pm)	Claremont 16.15 (111)	def.	Peel Thunder 8.4 (52)	Revo Fitness Stadium (crowd: 3,730)

	Semi Final 2
Saturday 17 September (2:10 pm)	West Perth 12.9 (81)	def.	East Fremantle 8.13 (61)	Pentanet Stadium (crowd: 3,280)
With the win for West Perth, it sees them through to the 2022 WAFL Grand Final

=== Week three ===
	Preliminary final
Sunday 25 September (2:10 pm)	East Fremantle 6.7 (43)	def. by	Claremont 10.11 (71)	New Choice Homes Park (crowd: 4,567)

=== Grand Final ===
2022 WAFL Grand Final
Saturday 1 October (3:00 pm)	West Perth	def.	Claremont	Leederville Oval (crowd: 16,791)
3.2 (20); 5.4 (34); 9.5 (59); 10.9 (69)	Q1; Q2; Q3; Final	0.5 (5); 3.7 (25); 6.9 (45); 8.9 (57)	Umpires: C Jones, R McCaw, M Adams; Simpson Medal: Luke Meadows; Television broadcast: Channel 7
M Dobson (2), J Hinder (2), T Keitel (2), C Rundle (2), A Hamp (1), C Lynch (1)	Goals	C England (2), M Spyvee (2), J Buller (1), D Mountford (1), B Rogers (1), O Sheldrick (1)
L Meadows, S Nelson, M Dobson, T Keitel, A Black, M Peirce	Best	J Buller, D Mountford, J Bolton, C England, O Eastland, B Rogers

== Single Game Records ==
=== Individual ===
- Most Disposals in a match: Jye Bolton, 51 disposals vs. Swan Districts, Steel Blue Oval, Round 4
- Most Kicks in a match: Toby McQuilkin, 33 kicks vs. East Perth, Leederville Oval, Round 8
- Most Handballs in a match: Jesse Turner, 26 handballs vs. Subiaco, Steel Blue Oval, Round 10
- Most Marks in a match: Harry Edwards, 23 marks vs. South Fremantle, Mineral Resources Park, Round 10
- Most Tackles in a match: Haiden Schloithe, 15 tackles vs. East Fremantle, WACA, Round 14
- Most Hitouts in a match: Scott Jones, 62 hitouts vs. Subiaco, Leederville Oval, Round 17
- Most Goals in a match: Jonathon Marsh, 6 goals vs. East Perth, Northampton Community Oval, Round 3
- Most Scoring Shots in a match: Tyler Keitel, 10 shots (5 goals 5 behinds) vs. West Coast WAFL, Pentanet Stadium, Round 5

- Most Disposals in a Finals match: Lachlan Martinis, 34 disposals vs. East Fremantle, New Choice Homes Park, Qualifying Final
- Most Kicks in a Finals match: Cameron Eardley, 26 kicks vs. Claremont, New Choice Homes Park, Qualifying Final
- Most Handballs in a Finals match: Kyle Baskerville, 16 handballs vs. Claremont, New Choice Homes Park, Qualifying Final, Lachlan Martinis, 16 handballs vs. East Fremantle, New Choice Homes Park, Qualifying Final
- Most Marks in a Finals match: Jamie Meade & Cameron Eardley, 10 marks vs. Claremont, New Choice Homes Park, Qualifying Final
- Most Tackles in a Finals match: Mitchell Crowden, 10 tackles vs. South Fremantle, Fremantle Community Bank Oval, Elimination Final

Conal Lynch, 10 tackles vs. Claremont, Leederville Oval, Grand Final

- Most Hitouts in a Finals match: Oliver Eastland, 44 hitouts vs. West Perth, Leederville Oval, Grand Final
- Most Goals in a Finals match: Dylan Main, 4 goals vs. Peel Thunder, Fremantle Community Bank Oval, Elimination Final
- Most Scoring Shots in a Finals match: Dylan Main, 6 scoring shots (4 goals 2 behinds) vs. Peel Thunder, Fremantle Community Bank Oval, Elimination Final, Sam Sturt, 6 scoring shots (3 goals 3 behinds) vs. South Fremantle, Fremantle Community Bank Oval, Elimination Final

=== Team ===
- Highest Score: East Fremantle 23.14 (152) vs. Perth, WACA, Round 15
- Lowest Score: West Coast WAFL 1.5 (11) vs. Swan Districts, Steel Blue Oval, Round 17
- Biggest Margin: 123 points – East Fremantle 22.14 (146) vs. West Coast WAFL 3.5 (23), New Choice Homes Park, Round 4
- Highest Losing Score: Peel Thunder 14.9 (93) vs. West Perth 16.8 (104), Lane Group Stadium, Round 2
- Lowest Winning Score: Claremont 5.5 (35) vs. Subiaco 4.4 (28), Leederville Oval, Round 14
- Highest Aggregate Score: 208 points – East Perth 23.14 (152) vs. Perth 9.2 (56), WACA, Round 15
- Lowest Aggregate Score: 63 points – Claremont 5.5 (35) vs. Subiaco 4.4 (28), Leederville Oval, Round 14
- Highest Home-and-Away Season Crowd: 6,023, South Fremantle vs. East Fremantle, Fremantle Community Bank Oval, Round 7
- Lowest Home-and-Away Season Crowd: 419, Subiaco vs West Coast, New Choice Homes Park, Round 16

== Awards ==
=== Player ===
==== Bernie Naylor Medal ====
- Numbers highlighted in blue indicates the player led the Bernie Naylor Medal at the end of that round.
- Numbers underlined indicates the player did not play in that round.

	Player	1	2	3	4	5	6	7	8	9	10	11	12	13	14	15	16	17	18	Total
1	Ben Sokol	2_{2}	3_{5}	1_{6}	5_{11}	4_{15}	2_{17}	1_{18}	1_{19}	2_{21}	2_{23}	2_{25}	2_{27}	2_{29}	3_{32}	1_{33}	3_{36}	2_{38}	3_{41}	41
2	Jonathon Marsh	3_{3}	0_{3}	6_{9}	0_{9}	0_{9}	5_{14}	2_{16}	0_{16}	3_{19}	2_{21}	2_{23}	0_{23}	0_{23}	5_{28}	0_{28}	4_{32}	4_{36}	0_{36}	36
3	Tyler Keitel	2_{2}	0_{2}	3_{5}	1_{6}	5_{11}	0_{11}	1_{12}	0_{12}	2_{14}	3_{17}	3_{20}	4_{24}	1_{25}	2_{27}	0_{27}	3_{30}	0_{30}	5_{35}	35
4	Keegan Knott	1_{1}	4_{5}	4_{9}	1_{10}	3_{13}	1_{14}	3_{17}	4_{21}	0_{21}	0_{21}	0_{21}	2_{23}	2_{25}	0_{25}	1_{26}	4_{30}	3_{33}	1_{34}	34
5	Ryan Borchet	1_{1}	2_{3}	1_{4}	0_{4}	4_{8}	0_{8}	4_{12}	3_{15}	5_{20}	2_{22}	0_{22}	2_{24}	0_{24}	0_{28}	3_{27}	0_{27}	2_{29}	0_{29}	29
5	Christopher Jones	0_{0}	0_{0}	3_{3}	5_{8}	3_{11}	2_{13}	2_{15}	5_{20}	1_{21}	1_{22}	0_{22}	0_{22}	3_{25}	0_{25}	2_{27}	2_{29}	0_{29}	0_{29}	29
7	Thomas Medhat	2_{2}	4_{6}	1_{7}	1_{8}	2_{10}	0_{10}	2_{12}	3_{15}	3_{18}	0_{18}	0_{18}	5_{23}	1_{24}	0_{24}	1_{25}	0_{25}	1_{26}	0_{26}	26
8	Blair Bell	2_{2}	0_{2}	3_{5}	2_{7}	0_{7}	3_{10}	0_{10}	1_{11}	1_{12}	3_{15}	0_{15}	0_{15}	2_{17}	1_{18}	1_{19}	2_{21}	3_{24}	0_{24}	24
9	Jack Buller	0_{0}	0_{0}	2_{2}	3_{5}	3_{8}	0_{8}	1_{9}	1_{10}	1_{11}	1_{12}	0_{12}	4_{16}	2_{18}	2_{20}	3_{23}	0_{23}	0_{23}	0_{23}	23
9	Luke English	0_{0}	1_{1}	0_{1}	4_{5}	2_{7}	1_{8}	0_{8}	1_{9}	1_{10}	2_{12}	1_{13}	2_{15}	0_{15}	2_{17}	1_{18}	3_{21}	2_{23}	0_{23}	23
9	Samuel Stubbs	0_{0}	0_{0}	3_{3}	4_{7}	3_{10}	0_{10}	0_{10}	0_{10}	0_{10}	0_{10}	2_{12}	2_{14}	1_{15}	3_{18}	2_{20}	1_{21}	1_{22}	1_{23}	23
9	Sam Sturt	0_{0}	1_{1}	3_{4}	3_{7}	3_{10}	1_{11}	0_{11}	2_{13}	1_{14}	0_{14}	0_{14}	0_{14}	0_{14}	4_{18}	1_{19}	0_{19}	0_{19}	4_{23}	23

For reference, Brayden Noble from Swan Districts was the leader in the Bernie Naylor Medal through the first 2 rounds, kicking 5 in Round 1, and 2 in Round 2, putting him on 7.

- **Sandover Medal**

Blaine Boekhorst (East Fremantle)

- **Simpson Medallist (State Game)**

Leigh Kitchin (Subiaco Football Club)

=== Team ===
- **League Minor Premiers**

West Perth

- **Reserves Minor Premiers**

West Perth

- **Colts Minor Premiers**

West Perth

- **Rodriguez Shield**

West Perth

=== Individual Teams ===
- **Leading Goal Kickers**
- The number of goals kicked by each winner will be in brackets
- The person that was the Leading Goal Kicker for each grade will be in **bold**

	League	Reserves	Colts
Claremont	Jack Buller (23)	Max Minear (25)	Luke Brown (12)
East Fremantle	Jonathon Marsh (36)	Jack Norrish (15)	Ben Praxl (11)
East Perth	Thomas Medhat (26)	Thomas Graham, Mitchell Schofield (16)	Mitchell Williams (21)
Peel Thunder	Blair Bell (24)	Ben Middleton (15)	Byron Finch (21)
Perth	Samuel Stubbs (23)	Christian Martin (10)	Michael Hall (11)
South Fremantle	Mason Shaw (22)	Jack Blenchynden (21)	**Liam Brandis** (29)
Subiaco	**Ben Sokol** (41)	Jordan Faraone (18)	Koltyn Tholstrup (23)
Swan Districts	Christopher Jones (29)	Kristian Caporn (17)	Brodyn Fitzgerald (9)
West Coast	Joshua Burke (16)	N/A	N/A
West Perth	Tyler Keitel (35)	**Logan Foley** (30)	Jack DeMarte (26)

- West Coast only have a league side
