= 2000 Westar Rules season =

2000 premiership season
- Teams: 9
- Premiers: East Perth; 15th premiership
- Minor premiers: East Perth; 16th minor premiership
- Sandover Medallist: Richard Ambrose (Subiaco)
- Leading goalkicker: Rod Tregenza (East Fremantle)
- Matches played: 85

The 2000 Westar Rules season was the fourth season of "Westar Rules" and the 116th season of the various incarnations of senior football in Perth. It was the last season before the competition's name was changed back to the traditional "WAFL" as it was clear the public had not been attracted by the change. Owing to the Sydney Olympics, Westar Rules shortened the 2000 season from twenty to eighteen matches per club, and retained this eighteen-match season in 2001 and 2002 before going back to the twenty-match season used up to 2017.

The 2000 season saw East Perth freed from the coaching and ground disputes that had wiped out their 1999 season, aided by a host club arrangement with West Coast and with Leederville Oval as home ground and Tony Micale as coach. The team rose from second last, with only five wins, to top of the table losing only three games. The Royals were to decisively win the 2000, 2001 and 2002 premierships for the first “hat-trick” since Swan Districts between 1982 and 1984, and their only premierships since 1978. Cinderella club Peel Thunder rose off the bottom for the first time, winning twice as many matches as in their first three seasons combined.

Perth were affected by the loss of 1999 standout player Gus Seebeck at only twenty-three to become a member of the Australasian PGA after a brief second stint with South Fremantle, and also lost Leon Davis, Richard Kelly, Chance Bateman, Richard Pang and Russel Thomas. The Demons' 2000 season was until the last game an unmitigated disaster that saw a twenty-game losing streak. This constitutes Perth's longest run of losses and the equal seventh longest in WAFL history.

== Home-and-away season ==
=== Round 1 ===
	Round 1
Saturday, 1 April (2:15 pm)	Peel Thunder 10.10 (70)	def. by	Subiaco 15.27 (117)	Rushton Park (crowd: 1045)
Saturday, 1 April (2:15 pm)	South Fremantle 11.19 (85)	def. by	East Fremantle 14.12 (96)	Fremantle Oval (crowd: 2908)
Saturday, 1 April (2:15 pm)	Claremont 17.19 (121)	def.	Perth 5.8 (38)	Claremont Oval (crowd: 1042)
Sunday, 2 April (2:15 pm)	East Perth 13.13 (91)	def.	West Perth 8.14 (62)	Leederville Oval (crowd: 3685)
	Bye; Swan Districts
Peel have visions of a huge upset before Subiaco seize complete control in the third quarter where the Thunder total only 39 possessions.

=== Round 2 ===
	Round 2
Friday, 7 April (6:45 pm)	South Fremantle 12.12 (84)	def.	Swan Districts 9.17 (71)	Fremantle Oval (crowd: 1314)
Friday, 7 April (6:45 pm)	West Perth 15.13 (103)	def.	Claremont 7.8 (50)	Arena Joondalup (crowd: 1166)
Saturday, 8 April (2:15 pm)	Perth 10.8 (68)	def. by	East Fremantle 17.12 (114)	Lathlain Park (crowd: 1300)
Saturday, 8 April (2:15 pm)	Subiaco 13.11 (89)	def. by	East Perth 20.12 (132)	Subiaco Oval (crowd: 1964)
	Bye; Peel Thunder

=== Round 3 ===
	Round 3
Saturday, 15 April (2:15 pm)	East Perth 13.15 (93)	def.	Peel Thunder 9.8 (62)	Leederville Oval (crowd: 1407)
Saturday, 15 April (2:15 pm)	Claremont 4.7 (31)	def. by	Subiaco 11.11 (77)	Claremont Oval (crowd: 1234)
Saturday, 15 April (2:15 pm)	East Fremantle 25.6 (156)	def.	West Perth 14.13 (97)	East Fremantle Oval (crowd: 1806)
Saturday, 15 April (2:15 pm)	Swan Districts 17.15 (117)	def.	Perth 13.13 (91)	Bassendean Oval (crowd: 1523)
	Bye; South Fremantle
Subiaco, previously criticised as “soft”, produce a superb display in difficult conditions due to a strong sea breeze.; Injury-plagued Swan Districts ruckman Travis Edmonds leads the Swans to a comfortable win after being behind all day. Swans kick the last eight after Perth won the first three quarters.

=== Round 4 (Easter weekend) ===
	Round 4
Saturday, 22 April (2:15 pm)	Subiaco 14.9 (93)	def.	East Fremantle 10.12 (72)	Subiaco Oval (crowd: 1596)
Saturday, 22 April (2:15 pm)	Peel Thunder 16.14 (110)	def.	Claremont 12.11 (83)	Rushton Park (crowd: 1417)
Monday, 24 April (2:15 pm)	West Perth 19.15 (129)	def.	Swan Districts 10.13 (73)	Arena Joondalup (crowd: 2304)
Monday, 24 April (2:15 pm)	Perth 7.12 (54)	def. by	South Fremantle 8.18 (66)	Lathlain Park (crowd: 2002)
	Bye; East Perth
Peel Thunder record their first ever home-ground win, ending a run of 32 home-ground losses.; For the third straight week, Perth fade out in the last quarter, this time after Cleve Humphreys of South Fremantle kicks out on the full from point blank range.

=== Round 5 ===
	Round 5
Saturday, 29 April (2:15 pm)	Claremont 7.11 (53)	def. by	East Perth 16.8 (104)	Claremont Oval (crowd: 1293)
Saturday, 29 April (2:15 pm)	East Fremantle 16.15 (111)	def.	Peel Thunder 13.8 (86)	East Fremantle Oval (crowd: 1555)
Saturday, 29 April (2:15 pm)	Swan Districts 13.10 (88)	def. by	Subiaco 13.11 (89)	Bassendean Oval (crowd: 1897)
Saturday, 29 April (2:15 pm)	South Fremantle 17.13 (115)	def.	West Perth 10.14 (74)	Fremantle Oval (crowd: 1706)
	Bye; Perth
A snap from Swan Districts' Joel Cornelius is originally paid as a goal but reversed by the field umpire, giving Subiaco the match.

=== Round 6 ===
	Round 6
Saturday, 6 May (2:15 pm)	Subiaco 19.7 (121)	def.	South Fremantle 9.12 (66)	Subiaco Oval (crowd: 1385)
Saturday, 6 May (2:15 pm)	East Perth 15.8 (98)	def.	East Fremantle 9.12 (66)	Leederville Oval (crowd: 2189)
Saturday, 6 May (2:15 pm)	Peel Thunder 20.11 (131)	def. by	Swan Districts 21.14 (140)	Rushton Park (crowd: 1276)
Saturday, 6 May (2:15 pm)	West Perth 18.17 (125)	def.	Perth 7.7 (49)	Arena Joondalup (crowd: 1461)
	Bye; Claremont
Peel Thunder kick their first score of twenty goals, and their score remains easily the Thunder's highest losing score on record (the nearest approach being 121 points against Claremont in the last round of 2006); Dean Buszan kicks ten goals, still a Peel club record

=== Round 7 ===
	Round 7
Sunday, 14 May (2:15 pm)	South Fremantle 18.11 (119)	def. by	Peel Thunder 21.12 (138)	Fremantle Oval (crowd: 1129)
Sunday, 14 May (2:15 pm)	Perth 11.9 (75)	def. by	Subiaco 14.8 (92)	Lathlain Park (crowd: 1537)
Sunday, 14 May (2:15 pm)	Swan Districts 9.11 (65)	def. by	East Perth 17.10 (112)	Bassendean Oval (crowd: 2103)
Sunday, 14 May (2:15 pm)	East Fremantle 9.10 (64)	def. by	Claremont 14.13 (97)	East Fremantle Oval (crowd: 1305)
	Bye; West Perth
The Thunder break their record for the highest score for the second straight week; “Twin Towers” Buszan (who missed all of 1999 through injury) and Greg Sanders kick six and seven goals.

=== Round 8 ===
	Round 8
Saturday, 20 May (2:15 pm)	East Perth 20.19 (139)	def.	South Fremantle 8.9 (57)	Leederville Oval (crowd: 1987)
Saturday, 20 May (2:15 pm)	Peel Thunder 19.15 (129)	def.	Perth 16.15 (111)	Rushton Park (crowd: 1037)
Saturday, 20 May (2:15 pm)	Claremont 14.17 (101)	def.	Swan Districts 10.14 (74)	Claremont Oval (crowd: 1108)
Sunday, 21 May (2:15 pm)	Subiaco 9.16 (70)	def. by	West Perth 12.10 (82)	Subiaco Oval (crowd: 1652)
	Bye; East Fremantle

=== Round 9 ===
	Round 9
Saturday, 27 May (2:15 pm)	Perth 12.13 (85)	def. by	East Perth 19.10 (124)	Lathlain Park (crowd: 2273)
Saturday, 27 May (2:15 pm)	Swan Districts 8.9 (57)	def. by	East Fremantle 17.14 (116)	Bassendean Oval (crowd: 1830)
Saturday, 27 May (2:15 pm)	South Fremantle 14.6 (90)	def. by	Claremont 16.12 (108)	Fremantle Oval (crowd: 1339)
Saturday, 27 May (2:15 pm)	West Perth 14.16 (100)	def.	Peel Thunder 10.7 (67)	Esperance (crowd: 1873)
	Bye; Subiaco
On a Weekend promoted by Westar as “Belt Up WA”, Tregenza kicks eleven for the Sharks

=== Round 10 (Foundation Day) ===
	Round 10
Saturday, 3 June (2:15 pm)	Peel Thunder 5.8 (38)	def. by	Subiaco 20.10 (130)	Rushton Park (crowd: 1146)
Monday, 5 June (2:15 pm)	East Fremantle 19.10 (124)	def.	South Fremantle 14.8 (92)	East Fremantle Oval (crowd: 7251)
Monday, 5 June (2:15 pm)	West Perth 14.8 (92)	def.	East Perth 9.11 (65)	Arena Joondalup (crowd: 6534)
	Bye; Claremont, Perth, Swan Districts
Despite the loss of Andrew Donnelly, Subiaco crush the previously promising Thunder with state centre half-back Richard Ambrose taking over his centre half-forward role and the Peel midfield thrashed.; 1999 Simpson Medallist Christian Kelly ends East Perth's unbeaten start to 2000 with a superb display on the ball, backed up by outstanding display from the whole West Perth defence.

=== Round 11 ===
	Round 11
Saturday, 10 June (2:15 pm)	Swan Districts 13.10 (88)	def.	South Fremantle 6.6 (42)	Bassendean Oval (crowd: 1362)
Saturday, 10 June (2:15 pm)	Claremont 18.8 (116)	def.	West Perth 13.10 (88)	Claremont Oval (crowd: 1091)
Saturday, 10 June (2:15 pm)	East Fremantle 13.15 (93)	def.	Perth 9.8 (62)	East Fremantle Oval (crowd: 1336)
	Bye; East Perth, Peel Thunder, Subiaco
After revealing they required $200,000 to pay off crippling debts and avoid folding, Swan Districts overcame wet conditions in the first half to kick 8.5 (53) to 3.3 (21) after the long interval, with half-forward flanker Mark Piani kicking four goals.

=== Round 12 ===
	Round 12
Saturday, 17 June (2:15 pm)	Subiaco 24.16 (160)	def.	Claremont 11.6 (72)	Subiaco Oval (crowd: 1481)
Saturday, 17 June (2:15 pm)	Perth 6.11 (47)	def. by	Swan Districts 13.6 (84)	Lathlain Park (crowd: 1674)
Saturday, 17 June (2:15 pm)	East Perth 16.13 (109)	def.	Peel Thunder 10.8 (68)	Leederville Oval (crowd: 1545)
	Bye; East Fremantle, South Fremantle, West Perth
Subiaco's devastating midfield and a fine display by Perth reject Anthony Beattie seemingly seal Claremont's fate for 2000.; Peter Kelly kicks nine goals for the Swans in a dour game to keep the Demons winless.

=== Round 13 ===
	Round 13
Saturday, 24 June (2:15 pm)	Swan Districts 17.8 (110)	def.	West Perth 9.15 (69)	Bassendean Oval (crowd: 1975)
Saturday, 24 June (2:15 pm)	East Fremantle 9.14 (68)	def.	Subiaco 9.11 (65)	East Fremantle Oval (crowd: 1394)
Saturday, 24 June (2:15 pm)	Claremont 19.8 (122)	def.	Peel Thunder 6.9 (45)	Claremont Oval (crowd: 798)
Saturday, 24 June (2:15 pm)	South Fremantle 26.17 (173)	def.	Perth 8.8 (56)	Fremantle Oval (crowd: 1262)
	Bye; East Perth
Sixteen-year-old Trinity College boy Ashley Sampi steals the show during a brilliant return to form by South Fremantle with seventeen kicks and some amazing individual skills.; Peel, with Dean Buszan out for the season due to persistent ankle problems, are restricted to 0.1 (1) in the first half as Anthony Jones shows himself ready for an AFL recall and Claremont keep their finals hopes alive.

=== Round 14 ===
	Round 14
Friday, 30 June (6:45 pm)	Claremont 15.11 (101)	def.	East Perth 9.8 (62)	Karratha (crowd: 5532)
Saturday, 1 July (2:15 pm)	West Perth 5.16 (46)	def. by	South Fremantle 14.8 (92)	Arena Joondalup (crowd: 1168)
Saturday, 1 July (2:15 pm)	Swan Districts 12.6 (78)	def.	Subiaco 10.15 (75)	Kununurra (crowd: 3214)
Saturday, 1 July (2:15 pm)	Peel Thunder 4.5 (29)	def. by	East Fremantle 7.17 (59)	Rushton Park (crowd: 815)
	Bye; Perth
Westar Rules schedule games for the Pilbara town of Karratha and the Kimberley town of Kununurra. Despite good attendances, the experiments were not repeated until 2011 and 2013 respectively.; Swan Districts record what would become their last win against the Lions until the Foundation Day Saturday of 2006, setting a record streak of thirteen losses in between.; Peel Thunder become the first WANFL/WAFL/Westar Rules team to fail to score in the second half since Subiaco against East Fremantle in 1954. The Thunder kick 4.4 in the first nineteen minutes in heavy rain and gale-force winds but only one point midway through the second quarter afterwards.

=== Round 15 ===
	Round 15
Saturday, 8 July (2:15 pm)	East Fremantle 10.17 (77)	def. by	East Perth 13.12 (90)	East Fremantle Oval (crowd: 2355)
Saturday, 8 July (2:15 pm)	Swan Districts 24.15 (159)	def.	Peel Thunder 10.15 (75)	Bassendean Oval (crowd: 1728)
Saturday, 8 July (2:15 pm)	South Fremantle 9.17 (71)	def. by	Subiaco 11.9 (75)	Fremantle Oval (crowd: 1458)
Saturday, 8 July (2:15 pm)	Perth 11.8 (74)	def. by	West Perth 12.12 (84)	Lathlain Park (crowd: 2184)
	Bye; Claremont
Ultra-defensive tactics cost Perth a maiden victory for 2000 after hitting the lead

=== Round 16 ===
	Round 16
Saturday, 15 July (2:15 pm)	Claremont 18.16 (124)	def.	East Fremantle 10.11 (71)	Claremont Oval (crowd: 1071)
Saturday, 15 July (2:15 pm)	East Perth 21.18 (144)	def.	Swan Districts 17.7 (109)	Leederville Oval (crowd: 2606)
Saturday, 15 July (2:15 pm)	Peel Thunder 10.9 (69)	def. by	South Fremantle 22.15 (147)	Rockingham (crowd: 2474)
Saturday, 15 July (2:15 pm)	Subiaco 15.10 (100)	def.	Perth 6.5 (41)	Subiaco Oval (crowd: 1286)
	Bye; West Perth
In perhaps the highest-standard Westar Rules match for a long time despite rainy conditions, Josh Wooden's running play allows East Perth to defeat the finals charge of the financially stricken Swans.

=== Round 17 ===
	Round 17
Saturday, 22 July (2:15 pm)	Swan Districts 8.6 (54)	def.	Claremont 6.16 (52)	Bassendean Oval (crowd: 1601)
Saturday, 22 July (2:15 pm)	South Fremantle 9.6 (60)	def. by	East Perth 16.12 (108)	Fremantle Oval (crowd: 1484)
Saturday, 22 July (2:15 pm)	Perth 8.17 (65)	def. by	Peel Thunder 15.10 (100)	Lathlain Park (crowd: 1263)
Saturday, 22 July (2:15 pm)	West Perth 10.11 (71)	def.	Subiaco 5.11 (41)	Arena Joondalup (crowd: 1291)
	Bye; East Fremantle

=== Round 18 ===
	Round 18
Saturday, 29 July (2:15 pm)	East Fremantle 13.8 (86)	def. by	Swan Districts 18.11 (119)	East Fremantle Oval (crowd: 2016)
Saturday, 29 July (2:15 pm)	Claremont 12.19 (91)	def.	South Fremantle 10.13 (73)	Claremont Oval (crowd: 1133)
Saturday, 29 July (2:15 pm)	Peel Thunder 9.21 (75)	def. by	West Perth 12.12 (84)	Rushton Park (crowd: 1025)
Saturday, 29 July (2:15 pm)	East Perth 20.14 (134)	def.	Perth 10.6 (66)	Leederville Oval (crowd: 1717)
	Bye; Subiaco
Peel's wasteful forwards and an elementary error during a late-game kick-in where they leave reigning Simpson Medallist Christian Kelly unmarked cost it a fifth win

=== Round 19 ===
	Round 19
Saturday, 5 August (2:15 pm)	Claremont 11.13 (79)	def.	Perth 10.8 (68)	Toodyay (crowd: 1086)
Saturday, 5 August (2:15 pm)	South Fremantle 16.11 (107)	def.	East Fremantle 8.6 (54)	Fremantle Oval (crowd: 1585)
Saturday, 5 August (2:15 pm)	West Perth 3.5 (23)	def. by	East Perth 4.11 (35)	Arena Joondalup (crowd: 1331)
Saturday, 5 August (2:15 pm)	Subiaco 12.15 (87)	def.	Peel Thunder 7.11 (53)	Subiaco Oval (crowd: 953)
	Bye; Swan Districts
On a rainswept Arena Joondalup, strong rivals West Perth and East Perth play the lowest-scoring WANFL/WAFL/WASFL/Westar game since West Perth 5.4 (34) beat Perth 3.4 (22) in 1964.; The score is West Perth's lowest since kicking 2.9 (21) against East Fremantle in the 1925 Semi-Final.; In Toodyay, Perth, despite having 33 more marks and 20 more kicks, still cannot break their duck for the season as Clayton Gardiner's size and power convert chances too well.

=== Round 20 ===
	Round 20
Saturday, 12 August (2:15 pm)	Claremont 10.13 (73)	def.	West Perth 7.10 (52)	Claremont Oval (crowd: 1489)
Saturday, 12 August (2:15 pm)	East Fremantle 18.9 (117)	def.	Perth 5.8 (38)	East Fremantle Oval (crowd: 1487)
Saturday, 12 August (2:15 pm)	East Perth 10.11 (71)	def. by	Subiaco 10.14 (74)	Leederville Oval (crowd: 3098)
Saturday, 12 August (2:15 pm)	Swan Districts 10.9 (69)	def. by	South Fremantle 14.11 (95)	Bassendean Oval (crowd: 3539)
	Bye; Peel Thunder
After John Todd tries to play Craig Callaghan, who was controversially ruled ineligible for the Westar finals and is taken off after tossing, the Swans fall under on- and off-field pressure against the seventh-placed Bulldogs.

=== Round 21 ===
	Round 21
Saturday, 19 August (2:15 pm)	West Perth 11.15 (81)	def. by	East Fremantle 16.17 (113)	Arena Joondalup (crowd: 1772)
Saturday, 19 August (2:15 pm)	Subiaco 13.8 (86)	def. by	Claremont 13.15 (93)	Subiaco Oval (crowd: 2070)
Saturday, 19 August (2:15 pm)	Peel Thunder 13.10 (88)	def. by	East Perth 15.13 (103)	Rushton Park (crowd: 1402)
Saturday, 19 August (2:15 pm)	Perth 18.12 (120)	def.	Swan Districts 8.8 (56)	Lathlain Park (crowd: 2076)
	Bye; South Fremantle
Perth escape their first-ever winless season with a convincing victory over Swan Districts. Perth were previously winless with a round to play and won in 1923, though they had drawn one game.; The Demons are neck-and-neck with Swan Districts before the report and send-off of Swan fullback Steve Kelderman for striking an umpire lets Perth run away and kick 10.7 (67) to 0.2 (2) for the rest of the game.; East Fremantle give West Perth, who needed to win by eight-and-a-half goals to make the four, not the slightest whiff of a chance with a solid win that made critics rethink their finals chances.

== Ladder ==
2000 Westar Rules ladder
Pos	Team	Pld	W	L	D	PF	PA	PP	Pts
1	East Perth (P)	18	15	3	0	1814	1297	139.9	60
2	Subiaco	18	12	6	0	1641	1272	129.0	48
3	Claremont	18	12	6	0	1567	1419	110.4	48
4	East Fremantle	18	11	7	0	1657	1488	111.4	44
5	West Perth	18	9	9	0	1462	1465	99.8	36
6	Swan Districts	18	9	9	0	1611	1658	97.2	36
7	South Fremantle	18	8	10	0	1634	1581	103.4	32
8	Peel Thunder	18	4	14	0	1433	1939	73.9	16
9	Perth	18	1	17	0	1208	1908	63.3	4

Source: "2000 Ladder". WAFL Footy Facts.
Rules for classification: 1) points; 2) percentage; 3) number of points for.
(P) Premiers

== Finals ==
=== Semi-finals ===
	First semi-final
Sunday, 27 August (2:15 pm)	Claremont 9.11 (65)	def. by	East Fremantle 12.9 (81)	Subiaco Oval (crowd: 8,642)
Claremont's lack of an effective forward (no Tiger kicked more than one goal) costs it a game they were expected to win.

	Second semi-final
Sunday, 27 August (6:45 pm)	East Perth 12.9 (81)	def.	Subiaco 9.7 (61)	Subiaco Oval (crowd: 8,642)
Since the two finals were played on the same day at the same venue, the attendance figure is the same.

=== Preliminary final ===
	Preliminary final
Sunday, 3 September (2:15 pm)	Subiaco 10.13 (73)	def. by	East Fremantle 13.7 (85)	Subiaco Oval (crowd: 4,609)
The Sharks are unexpectedly stronger at the finish in a hard and tough game.

=== Grand Final ===
2000 Westar Rules Grand Final
Saturday, 9 September	East Perth	def.	East Fremantle	Subiaco Oval (crowd: 30,174)
4.1 (25); 9.6 (60); 12.8 (80); 18.11 (119)	Q1; Q2; Q3; Final	1.4 (10); 7.7 (49); 8.13 (61); 11.14 (80)	Umpires: Brett Rosebury, David Corcoran, Dean Margetts; Simpson Medal: Dean Cox (East Perth)
Ridley 3, Wilson 3, Hutchinson 3, Haynes 2, Chambers 2, Munro 2, Marsh, Holman, Knights	Goals	Tregenza 3, Scott Spalding 3, Morgan 2, Willison, Bowden, Roser
Cox, Wheatley, Wooden, Chambers, Barnard, Wilson	Best	Morgan, Gaspar, Spalding, Roser, Tregenza, Green
Kane Marsh (jaw)	Injuries	Leigh Willison (cheek)
East Perth overcame the loss of vice-captain Rod Wheatley (hit in the face by a ball soccered by Leigh Willison) to comfortably win their first premiership in 22 years.
