= 2025 WAFL season =

141st season of the West Australian Football League

- Date: 5 April – 21 September 2025
- Teams: 10
- Premiers: South Fremantle; 15th premiership
- Minor premiers: South Fremantle; 14th minor premiership
- Sandover Medallist: Charlie Constable (Perth – 29 votes)
- Bernie Naylor Medallist: Tyler Keitel (West Perth – 52 goals)

The 2025 WAFL season was the 141st season of the West Australian Football League (WAFL). The season began on 5 April and concluded on 21 September.

== Background ==
=== Naming rights and fixture ===
The league announced a new naming rights sponsor ahead of the season, the first such sponsor since 2021, with overnight freight transportation company Sullivan Logisitics becoming the league's primary sponsor. The league's fixture included 20 home-and-away rounds followed by a four-week finals series, culminating in the grand final at Optus Stadium. Saturday night fixtures broadcast on free-to-air television station Seven became regularly scheduled, in recognition of the AFL's new broadcast deal which placed all Saturday matches on pay-TV.

In February, the Fremantle and Peel Thunder Football Club's announced the two sides would continue with their 11-year long reserves affiliation, which enables Fremantle-lised players not selected for the club's senior AFL team to play for Peel in the WAFL. Under the arrangement, Fremantle appoint Peel's senior WAFL team coach in consultation with Peel, while Peel will continue to appoint the Colts, Reserves and Assistant WAFL coaches, in consultation with Fremantle. The extension of the partnership is in effect to the end of the 2029 season.

== Clubs ==
=== Coach appointments ===
New coach	Club	Date of appointment	Previous coach	Ref
Mark Stone	Perth	6 September 2024	Peter German	
Craig White	South Fremantle	14 September 2024	Todd Curley	
Paul Sanzone	West Perth	23 June 2025	Jason Salecic	

=== Club leadership ===
Club	Coach	Leadership group			Ref
Club	Coach	Captain(s)	Vice-captain(s)	Other leader(s)	Ref
Claremont	Ash Prescott	Declan Mountford			
East Fremantle	Bill Monaghan	Kyle Baskerville	Jarrad Jansen, Jonathon Marsh		
East Perth	Ross McQueen	Hamish Brayshaw, Christian Ameduri	Scott Jones, Angus Scott	Harrison Macreadie, Kye Willcocks, Stan Wright, Corey Watts	
Peel Thunder	Adam Read	Ben Hancock			
Perth	Mark Stone	Corey Byrne, Charlie Constable	Aaron Clarke, Regan Clarke, Sam Simpson, Connor Sing		
South Fremantle	Craig White	Chad Pearson		Ethan Hughes, Trey Ruscoe, Glenn Stewart	
Subiaco	Beau Wardman	Greg Clark	Luke Foley, Ryan Borchet		
Swan Districts	Andrew Pruyn	Jesse Turner			
West Coast	Kyal Horsley	Jack Eastough, Shannon Lucassen	Harley Sparks, Andries Mercer		
West Perth	Jason Salecic (R1–R11)	Luke Meadows	Tyler Keitel		
West Perth	Paul Sanzone (R11–)	Luke Meadows	Tyler Keitel		

== Pre-season practice matches ==
=== Week 1 ===
	Week 1
Saturday, 8 March (2:10 pm)	West Perth 13.9 (87)	def.	Claremont 11.8 (74)	Arena Joondalup

=== Week 2 ===
	Week 2
Saturday, 15 March (11:10 am)	South Fremantle 12.9 (91)	def.	Subiaco 4.4 (28)	Fremantle Community Bank Oval
Saturday, 15 March (2:30 pm)	East Fremantle 13.14 (92)	def.	East Perth 6.9 (45)	The Good Grocer Park
Saturday, 15 March (2:30 pm)	Swan Districts 8.11 (59)	def. by	Claremont 11.10 (76)	Steel Blue Oval
Saturday, 15 March (2:30 pm)	Perth 16.14 (110)	def.	Peel Thunder 13.7 (85)	Mineral Resources Park
Saturday, 15 March (4:00 pm)	West Perth 15.16 (106)	def.	West Coast 5.12 (42)	Arena Joondalup

=== Week 3 ===
	Week 3
Saturday, 22 March (12:10 pm)	West Coast 16.12 (108)	def.	Peel Thunder 12.10 (82)	Mineral Resources Park
Saturday, 22 March (2:30 pm)	Swan Districts 9.15 (69)	def.	Perth 9.11 (65)	Steel Blue Oval
Saturday, 22 March (2:30 pm)	West Perth 10.8 (68)	def. by	East Fremantle 18.10 (118)	Arena Joondalup
Saturday, 22 March (2:30 pm)	Claremont 13.12 (90)	def.	Subiaco 10.6 (66)	Revo Fitness Stadium
Sunday 23 March (12:40 pm)	South Fremantle 13.15 (93)	def.	East Perth 5.6 (36)	Fremantle Community Bank Oval

=== Week 4 ===
	Week 4
Saturday, 29 March (9:30 am)	West Coast 16.12 (108)	def.	Swan Districts 15.6 (96)	Mineral Resources Park
Saturday, 29 March (11:30 am)	Subiaco 7.7 (49)	def. by	Peel Thunder 21.15 (141)	Sullivan Logistics Stadium
Saturday, 29 March (2:30 pm)	East Fremantle 11.9 (75)	def. by	Claremont 15.12 (102)	The Good Grocer Park

== Home-and-away season ==
Source: Click here

=== Round 1 ===
	Round 1
Saturday, 5 April (2:30 pm)	East Fremantle 20.11 (131)	def.	West Coast 12.10 (82)	The Good Grocer Park (crowd: TBC)
Saturday, 5 April (2:30 pm)	Subiaco 9.11 (65)	def. by	East Perth 12.8 (80)	Sullivan Logistics Stadium (crowd: 1,547)
Saturday, 5 April (2:30 pm)	Swan Districts 8.7 (55)	def. by	West Perth 16.7 (103)	Steel Blue Oval (crowd: 2,167)
Saturday, 5 April (2:30 pm)	Peel Thunder 12.7 (79)	drew with	Claremont 10.19 (79)	Lane Group Stadium (crowd: 1,130)
Saturday, 5 April (7:10 pm)	Perth 10.9 (69)	def. by	South Fremantle 12.10 (82)	Mineral Resources Park (crowd: 2,388)

=== Round 2 ===
	Round 2
Friday, 11 April (6:40 pm)	West Coast 9.19 (73)	def. by	Subiaco 13.14 (92)	Mineral Resources Park (crowd: TBC)
Saturday, 12 April (1:45 pm)	South Fremantle 11.14 (80)	def.	Peel Thunder 4.7 (31)	Fremantle Community Bank Oval (crowd: 2,305)
Saturday, 12 April (2:30 pm)	Claremont 17.15 (117)	def.	East Fremantle 6.1 (37)	Revo Fitness Stadium (crowd: 1,712)
Saturday, 12 April (2:30 pm)	East Perth 15.7 (97)	def.	Swan Districts 6.6 (42)	Sullivan Logistics Stadium (crowd: 1,574)
Saturday, 12 April (7:10 pm)	West Perth 6.14 (50)	def. by	Perth 8.13 (61)	Arena Joondalup (crowd: 2,144)

=== Round 3 ===
	Round 3
Friday, 18 April (7:10 pm)	East Perth 10.5 (65)	def.	Claremont 8.6 (54)	Sullivan Logistics Stadium (crowd: 2,010)
Saturday, 19 April (1:10 pm)	Peel Thunder 6.5 (41)	def. by	East Fremantle 15.13 (103)	Lane Group Stadium (crowd: 1,219)
Saturday, 19 April (2:30 pm)	South Fremantle 11.3 (69)	def.	Swan Districts 8.10 (58)	Fremantle Community Bank Oval (crowd: 2,101)
Saturday, 19 April (2:30 pm)	Perth 15.9 (99)	def.	West Coast 9.9 (63)	Mineral Resources Park (crowd: 1,903)
Saturday, 19 April (7:10 pm)	Subiaco 6.8 (48)	def. by	West Perth 16.8 (104)	Sullivan Logistics Stadium (crowd: 1,483)

=== Round 4 ===
	Round 4
Thursday, 24 April (7:30 pm)	West Perth 9.10 (64)	def. by	South Fremantle 14.7 (91)	Arena Joondalup (crowd: 2,606)
Friday, 25 April (1:40 pm)	Claremont 19.10 (124)	def.	West Coast 10.12 (72)	Revo Fitness Stadium (crowd: 1,156)
Saturday, 26 April (2:30 pm)	Swan Districts 6.12 (48)	def. by	Peel Thunder 7.11 (53)	Steel Blue Oval (crowd: 1,664)
Saturday, 26 April (2:30 pm)	East Fremantle 14.16 (100)	def.	Subiaco 10.10 (70)	The Good Grocer Park (crowd: TBC)
Saturday, 26 April (7:10 pm)	Perth 15.3 (93)	def.	East Perth 9.8 (62)	Mineral Resources Park (crowd: 1,715)

=== Round 5 ===
	Round 5
Friday, 2 May (7:30 pm)	West Perth 9.6 (60)	def. by	Claremont 10.9 (69)	Arena Joondalup (crowd: 2,452)
Saturday, 3 May (1:40 pm)	South Fremantle 9.12 (66)	def. by	West Coast 12.10 (82)	Fremantle Community Bank Oval (crowd: 1,065)
Saturday, 3 May (2:30 pm)	East Perth 13.8 (86)	def.	Peel Thunder 7.6 (48)	Sullivan Logistics Stadium (crowd: 1,177)
Saturday, 3 May (2:30 pm)	Swan Districts 8.9 (57)	def. by	East Fremantle 15.12 (102)	Steel Blue Oval (crowd: 1,524)
Saturday, 3 May (2:30 pm)	Perth 10.10 (70)	def.	Subiaco 7.12 (54)	Mineral Resources Park (crowd: 1,776)

=== Round 6 ===
	Round 6
Saturday, 10 May (11:10 am)	West Coast 9.4 (58)	def. by	East Perth 18.10 (118)	Mineral Resources Park (crowd: 426)
Saturday, 10 May (1:10 pm)	Peel Thunder 16.13 (109)	def.	West Perth 9.9 (63)	Lane Group Stadium (crowd: 1,039)
Saturday, 10 May (2:30 pm)	East Fremantle 13.20 (98)	def.	Perth 7.6 (48)	The Good Grocer Park (crowd: 2,248)
Saturday, 10 May (2:30 pm)	Claremont 7.9 (51)	def. by	South Fremantle 10.8 (68)	Revo Fitness Stadium (crowd: 1,750)
Saturday, 10 May (7:10 pm)	Subiaco 9.4 (58)	def. by	Swan Districts 20.13 (133)	Sullivan Logistics Stadium (crowd: 1,321)

=== Round 7 ===
	Round 7
Saturday, 24 May (2:10 pm)	Perth 12.8 (80)	def.	Peel Thunder 5.10 (40)	Mineral Resources Park (crowd: 1,466)
Saturday, 24 May (2:30 pm)	Swan Districts 4.10 (34)	def. by	Claremont 11.10 (76)	Steel Blue Oval (crowd: 1,713)
Saturday, 24 May (2:30 pm)	South Fremantle 18.14 (122)	def.	Subiaco 2.7 (19)	Fremantle Community Bank Oval (crowd: 1,573)
Saturday, 24 May (2:30 pm)	East Perth 9.8 (62)	def. by	East Fremantle 12.10 (82)	Sullivan Logistics Stadium (crowd: 1,416)
Saturday, 24 May (4:30 pm)	West Perth 17.10 (112)	def.	West Coast 8.7 (55)	Arena Joondalup (crowd: TBC)

=== Round 8 ===
	Round 8
Saturday, 31 May (2:30 pm)	Peel Thunder 10.7 (67)	def.	Subiaco 8.15 (63)	Lane Group Stadium (crowd: 777)
Saturday, 31 May (2:30 pm)	Claremont 20.8 (128)	def.	Perth 9.7 (61)	Revo Fitness Stadium (crowd: 1,754)
Saturday, 31 May (2:30 pm)	Swan Districts 11.10 (76)	def.	West Coast 7.7 (49)	Steel Blue Oval (crowd: 1,949)
Monday, 2 June (1:10 pm)	East Fremantle 4.3 (27)	def. by	South Fremantle 10.21 (81)	Fremantle Community Bank Oval (crowd: 5,064)
Monday, 2 June (2:30 pm)	East Perth 12.11 (83)	def.	West Perth 5.8 (38)	Sullivan Logistics Stadium (crowd: 2,777)

=== Round 9 ===
	Round 9
Saturday, 7 June (1:10 pm)	West Coast 9.6 (60)	def. by	Perth 14.14 (98)	Mineral Resources Park (crowd: 619)
Saturday, 7 June (4:10 pm)	Subiaco 10.4 (64)	def. by	Claremont 11.10 (76)	Sullivan Logistics Stadium (crowd: 927)
Saturday, 7 June (7:10 pm)	West Perth 8.7 (55)	def. by	East Fremantle 13.16 (94)	Arena Joondalup (crowd: TBC)
	Bye: Peel Thunder; Swan Districts; South Fremantle; East Perth

=== Round 10 ===
	Round 10
Saturday, 14 June (12:10 pm)	Peel Thunder 14.15 (99)	def.	West Coast 7.5 (47)	Lane Group Stadium (crowd: 655)
Saturday, 14 June (2:30 pm)	South Fremantle 15.7 (97)	def.	East Perth 12.15 (87)	Fremantle Community Bank Oval (crowd: 2,843)
Saturday, 14 June (2:30 pm)	Swan Districts 9.7 (61)	def. by	Perth 11.10 (76)	Steel Blue Oval (crowd: 2,244)
	Bye: Claremont; West Perth; East Fremantle; Subiaco

=== Round 11 ===
	Round 11
Saturday, 21 June (2:30 pm)	East Fremantle 4.10 (34)	def. by	Swan Districts 10.6 (66)	The Good Grocer Park (crowd: TBC)
Saturday, 21 June (2:30 pm)	Claremont 14.9 (93)	def.	West Perth 9.7 (61)	Revo Fitness Stadium (crowd: 1,252)
Saturday, 21 June (2:30 pm)	Peel Thunder 5.9 (39)	def. by	South Fremantle 11.8 (74)	Lane Group Stadium (crowd: 965)
Saturday, 21 June (9:10 pm)	East Perth 5.13 (43)	def. by	Subiaco 8.5 (53)	Sullivan Logistics Stadium (crowd: 1,353)
	Bye: West Coast; Perth

=== Round 12 ===
	Round 12
Saturday, 28 June (11:10 pm)	West Coast 6.9 (45)	def. by	Claremont 13.18 (96)	Mineral Resources Park (crowd: 362)
Saturday, 28 June (2:30 pm)	Subiaco 16.7 (103)	def.	East Fremantle 16.6 (102)	Sullivan Logistics Stadium (crowd: 826)
Saturday, 28 June (2:30 pm)	South Fremantle 10.9 (69)	def.	Perth 7.5 (47)	Fremantle Community Bank Oval (crowd: 1,819)
Saturday, 28 June (2:30 pm)	Swan Districts 7.4 (46)	def. by	East Perth 13.8 (86)	Steel Blue Oval (crowd: 2,352)
Saturday, 28 June (3:10 pm)	West Perth 11.12 (78)	def.	Peel Thunder 10.9 (69)	Arena Joondalup (crowd: 1,450)

=== Round 13 ===
	Round 13
Saturday, 5 July (1:00 pm)	South Fremantle 10.9 (69)	def.	Claremont 6.6 (42)	Fremantle Community Bank Oval (crowd: 2,287)
Saturday, 5 July (1:10 pm)	Peel Thunder 6.5 (41)	def. by	East Perth 10.9 (69)	Lane Group Stadium (crowd: 1,281)
Saturday, 5 July (2:30 pm)	Subiaco 8.9 (57)	def. by	West Coast 14.3 (87)	Sullivan Logistics Stadium (crowd: 852)
Saturday, 5 July (2:30 pm)	Perth 8.8 (56)	def.	East Fremantle 8.5 (53)	Mineral Resources Park (crowd: 1,860)
Saturday, 5 July (3:10 pm)	West Perth 11.8 (74)	def. by	Swan Districts 12.13 (85)	Arena Joondalup (crowd: 2,136)

=== Round 14 ===
	Round 14
Saturday, 12 July (2:30 pm)	Swan Districts 7.10 (52)	def. by	South Fremantle 9.11 (65)	Steel Blue Oval (crowd: 1,581)
Saturday, 12 July (2:30 pm)	East Perth 19.10 (124)	def.	Perth 7.2 (44)	Sullivan Logistics Stadium (crowd: 1,779)
Saturday, 12 July (6:10 pm)	West Perth 15.11 (101)	def.	West Coast 11.6 (72)	Arena Joondalup (crowd: 1,485)
	Bye: Subiaco; Peel Thunder; Claremont; East Fremantle

=== Round 15 ===
	Round 15
Saturday, 19 July (2:10 pm)	Perth 13.7 (85)	def.	Swan Districts 10.12 (72)	Mineral Resources Park (crowd: 1,844)
Saturday, 19 July (2:30 pm)	East Fremantle 12.14 (86)	def.	Peel Thunder 11.10 (76)	The Good Grocer Park (crowd: TBC)
Saturday, 19 July (2:30 pm)	Claremont 18.14 (122)	def.	Subiaco 5.5 (35)	Revo Fitness Stadium (crowd: 1,269)
	Bye: West Coast; West Perth; East Perth; South Fremantle

=== Round 16 ===
	Round 16
Saturday, 26 July (2:10 pm)	Subiaco 4.14 (38)	def. by	South Fremantle 15.9 (99)	Sullivan Logistics Stadium (crowd: 673)
Saturday, 26 July (2:30 pm)	East Fremantle 10.10 (70)	def. by	Claremont 11.9 (75)	The Good Grocer Park (crowd: TBC)
Saturday (3:10 pm)	West Perth 11.9 (75)	def. by	East Perth 15.11 (101)	Arena Joondalup (crowd: TBC)
Saturday, 26 July (2:30 pm)	Peel Thunder 10.8 (68)	def.	West Coast 8.8 (56)	Lane Group Stadium (crowd: 372)
	Bye: Perth; Swan Districts

=== Round 17 ===
	Round 17
Saturday, 2 August (2:30 pm)	South Fremantle 18.7 (115)	def.	East Fremantle 11.5 (71)	Fremantle Community Bank Oval (crowd: 2,249)
Saturday, 2 August (2:30 pm)	Swan Districts 6.7 (43)	def.	Subiaco 3.7 (25)	Steel Blue Oval (crowd: 1,331)
Saturday, 2 August (2:30 pm)	East Perth 20.4 (124)	def.	West Coast 8.7 (55)	Sullivan Logistics Stadium (crowd: 1,397)
Saturday, 2 August (2:30 pm)	Perth 9.12 (66)	def. by	West Perth 12.9 (81)	Mineral Resources Park (crowd: 1,142)
Saturday, 2 August (2:40 pm)	Claremont 8.6 (54)	def.	Peel Thunder 1.10 (16)	Revo Fitness Stadium (crowd: 1,430)

=== Round 18 ===
	Round 18
Saturday, 9 August (2:10 pm)	East Perth 4.4 (28)	def. by	South Fremantle 11.9 (75)	Sullivan Logistics Stadium (crowd: 1,437)
Saturday, 9 August (2:30 pm)	Peel Thunder 10.9 (69)	def. by	Perth 15.8 (98)	Lane Group Stadium (crowd: 976)
Saturday, 9 August (2:30 pm)	East Fremantle 8.17 (65)	def.	West Coast 7.6 (48)	The Good Grocer Park (crowd: 1,274)
Saturday, 9 August (2:30 pm)	Claremont 13.6 (84)	def.	Swan Districts 6.10 (46)	Revo Fitness Stadium (crowd: 1,120)
Saturday, 9 August (3:10 pm)	West Perth 11.8 (74)	def. by	Subiaco 11.10 (76)	Arena Joondalup (crowd: 1,367)

=== Round 19 ===
	Round 19
Saturday, 16 August (2:10 pm)	East Fremantle 13.10 (88)	def.	East Perth 11.7 (73)	The Good Grocer Park (crowd: 2,508)
Saturday, 16 August (2:30 pm)	South Fremantle 20.10 (130)	def.	West Perth 10.8 (68)	Fremantle Community Bank Oval (crowd: 2,002)
Saturday, 16 August (2:30 pm)	Perth 11.7 (73)	def. by	Claremont 13.8 (86)	Mineral Resources Park (crowd: 1,683)
Saturday, 16 August (3:00 pm)	Subiaco 4.9 (33)	def. by	Peel Thunder 13.12 (90)	Sullivan Logistics Stadium (crowd: 760)
Saturday, 16 August (5:40 pm)	West Coast 11.7 (73)	def. by	Swan Districts 11.12 (78)	Mineral Resources Park (crowd: 562)

=== Round 20 ===
	Round 20
Saturday, 23 August (11:10 pm)	West Coast 9.3 (57)	def. by	South Fremantle 22.12 (144)	Mineral Resources Park (crowd: 399)
Saturday, 23 August (2:10 pm)	Claremont 13.11 (89)	def.	East Perth 12.8 (80)	Revo Fitness Stadium (crowd: 1,574)
Saturday, 23 August (2:30 pm)	East Fremantle 21.13 (139)	def.	West Perth 10.7 (67)	The Good Grocer Park (crowd: 2,112)
Saturday, 23 August (2:30 pm)	Peel Thunder 15.15 (105)	def.	Swan Districts 7.9 (51)	Lane Group Stadium (crowd: 1,489)
Saturday, 23 August (2:30 pm)	Subiaco 8.5 (53)	def. by	Perth 13.15 (93)	Sullivan Logistics Stadium (crowd: TBC)

== Ladder ==
Pos	Team	Pld	W	L	D	PF	PA	PP	Pts	Qualification
1	South Fremantle (P)	18	17	1	0	1596	930	171.6	68	Finals series
2	Claremont	18	14	3	1	1515	1035	146.4	58	Finals series
3	East Perth	18	11	7	0	1468	1143	128.4	44	Finals series
4	East Fremantle	18	11	7	0	1482	1292	114.7	44	Finals series
5	Perth	18	11	7	0	1317	1305	100.9	44	Finals series
6	Peel Thunder	18	7	10	1	1140	1248	91.3	30	
7	West Perth	18	6	12	0	1328	1492	89.0	24	
8	Swan Districts	18	6	12	0	1103	1314	83.9	24	
9	Subiaco	18	4	14	0	1002	1578	63.5	16	
10	West Coast (R)	18	2	16	0	1134	1748	64.9	8	

Source: WAFL.com.au
Rules for classification: 1) points; 2) percentage; 3) number of points for.
(P) Premiers

(R) = Reserves for AFL seniors

== Finals series ==
=== Qualifying and elimination finals ===
	Qualifying and elimination finals
Saturday, 30 August (2:10 pm)	Claremont 7.11 (53)	def. by	East Perth 10.6 (66)	Revo Fitness Stadium (crowd: 3,643)	Report
Sunday, 31 August (2:10 pm)	East Fremantle 11.11 (77)	def. by	Perth 16.10 (106)	The Good Grocer Park (crowd: 5,843)	Report
Perth recorded their first finals win since 1997.

=== Semi-finals ===
	Semi finals
Saturday, 6 September (1:50pm)	South Fremantle 12.7 (79)	def.	East Perth 3.2 (20)	Fremantle Community Bank Oval (crowd: 2,666)	Report
Sunday, 7 September (2:10pm)	Claremont 12.10 (82)	def.	Perth 6.7 (43)	Revo Fitness Stadium (crowd: 4,127)	Report

=== Preliminary finals ===
	Preliminary final
Sunday, 14 September (2:10pm)	East Perth 7.4 (46)	def.	Claremont 5.11 (41)	Sullivan Logistics Stadium (crowd: 3,322)	Report

=== Grand final ===
2025 WAFL Grand Final
Sunday 21 September (3:20 pm)	South Fremantle	def.	East Perth	Optus Stadium, Perth (crowd: 23,752)
1.2 (8); 4.4 (28); 6.6 (42); 8.8 (56)	Q1; Q2; Q3; Final	1.0 (6); 2.2 (14); 3.4 (22); 8.6 (54)	Umpires: M Adams T McPhee L Fahey-Gilmour B Laycock; Simpson Medal: Hamish Free (South Fremantle); Television broadcast: Seven Network
H Free 2 T Ruscoe, J Florenca, M Parker, Z Strom, H Schloithe, R O’Hehir 1	Goals	H Brayshaw 2 L Tedesco, C Burgiel, S Jones, M Schofield, S van Diemen, X Milner 1
H Free, C Pearson, J Jones, J Florenca, E Hughes, R O’Hehir	Best	S Wright, J Baker, H Brayshaw, T North, C Watts, Z Raykos

Memorable for its conclusion, South Fremantle gradually built a comfortable lead across a low-scoring game, and with 17 minutes elapsed in the final quarter held a 22 point lead. East Perth kicked three goals in the last fifteen minutes to narrow the deficit to only two points. With only a couple of seconds remaining, Jordyn Baker won a holding the ball free kick for East Perth in the centre circles; and when the siren sounded, South Fremantle's Aaron Drage, who was in possession of the ball and had yet to return it to Baker, kicked the ball high in celebration. Over the next couple of minutes, South Fremantle players celebrated, the stadium PA system played the club song, and ground staff began preparing the presentation stage and pyrotechnics – while East Perth players appealed for a 50m penalty for Drage kicking the ball away, and even for a head count as South Fremantle players had entered the field from the bench. The umpires refused any additional penalty; and eventually, after the field was cleared, Baker took an after-the-siren set shot from the centre circles which fell about 25 metres short of scoring. The following day WA Football issued a statement approving the umpiring decisions in the final moments of the match, stating that decision to not pay a 50m penalty was the correct one because there was no intent to waste time with no more time left in the match, and that not giving a 50m penalty for several South Fremantle players running onto the field to celebrate after the siren was also the correct decision given this act had no impact on the game.

== Representative match ==
An interstate representative match between the WAFL and SANFL took place May at Adelaide Oval.

2025 Kia State Game
Saturday, 17 May (11:30 ACST)	SANFL	def. by	WAFL	Adelaide Oval
2.3 (15); 4.5 (29); 5.6 (36); 8.8 (56)	Q1; Q2; Q3; Final	2.1 (13); 5.2 (32); 10.6 (66); 13.8 (86)	Fos Williams Medal (SANFL) & Simpson Medal (WAFL): Mani Liddy (SANFL), Milan Murdock (WAFL)
Hosie 4, McBean 2, Rowe, Allen	Goals	Borchet 4, May 2, Schofield 2, Clarke, Davis, Hinder, Jones, Sears
Liddy, Hosie, Allen, Hilder, Lukac	Best	Murdock, Borchet, Sellwood, Turner, Ameduri, Eardley, Hinder, May
This was the 100th state game between the two states.; Match was played as a curtain raiser for the Port Adelaide vs Geelong Round 10 AFL match.; SANFL Fos Williams Medallist Mani Liddy was selected by Port Adelaide AFL with pick 16 of the 2025 mid-season rookie draft on 28 May 2025. He made his debut in round 14 of the 2025 AFL season.

== Single game records ==
=== Individual ===
- Most Disposals in a match: Jesse Turner, 44 disposals vs. West Perth, Steel Blue Oval, Round 1
- Most Kicks in a match: Jye Bolton, 26 kicks vs. Subiaco, Sullivan Logistics Stadium, Round 9
- Most Handballs in a match: Will Brodie, 27 handballs vs. West Perth, Lane Group Stadium, Round 6
- Most Marks in a match: Jesse Turner, 15 marks vs. East Perth, Steel Blue Oval, Round 12
- Most Tackles in a match: Milan Murdock, 18 tackles vs. Swan Districts, The Good Grocer Park, Round 11
- Most Hitouts in a match: Hamish Free, 60 hitouts vs. Subiaco, Fremantle Community Bank Stadium, Round 9
- Most Goals in a match: 7 goals, Multiple people (Including Aaron Clarke twice)

=== Team ===
- Highest Score: Swan Districts 20.13 (133) vs. Subiaco, Sullivan Logistics Stadium, Round 6
- Lowest Score: Peel Thunder 1.10 (16) vs. Claremont, Revo Fitness Stadium, Round 17
- Biggest Margin: 103 points – South Fremantle 18.14 (122) vs. Subiaco 2.7 (19), Fremantle Community Bank Stadium, Round 7
- Highest Losing Score: East Fremantle 16.6 (102) vs. Subiaco 16.7 (103), Sulllivan Logistics Stadium, Round 12
- Lowest Winning Score: Swan Districts 6.7 (43) vs. Subiaco, Steel Blue Oval, Round 17
- Highest Aggregate Score: 213 points – East Fremantle 20.11 (131) vs. West Coast WAFL 12.10 (82), The Good Grocer Park, Round 1
- Lowest Aggregate Score: 68 Points- Swan Districts 6.7 (43) vs. Subiaco 3.7 (25), Steel Blue Oval, Round 17

== See also ==
- 2025 WAFL Women's season
