= 2025 WAFL Women's season =

- Date: 29 March – 24 August 2025
- Teams: 9
- Premiers: Claremont; 3rd premiership
- Minor premiers: Claremont; 3rd minor premiership

The 2025 WAFL Women's season was the seventh season of the WAFL Women's (WAFLW). The season commenced on 29 March and concluded with the Grand Final on 24 August. Defending premiers Claremont successfully defended their premiership by defeating Swan Districts in the grand final.

== Background ==
=== Clubs ===
The West Australian Football Commission announced that Perth Football Club would enter a team in the league for the 2025 season, ensuring that all nine traditional WAFL clubs would have a women's side competing for the first time since the inception of the women's competition. Perth had been a competitive side in the second-tier Rogers Cup female league, winning six matches in 2024 in just their second season in the competition.

=== Representative match ===
Ahead of the season, both the West Australian and South Australian Football Commission's announced that a state league representative match between the SANFLW and WAFLW would take place in May.

2025 State Game
Saturday, 3 May (13:15 ACST)	SANFL Women	def.	WAFL Women	Adelaide Oval
2.0 (12); 3.1 (19); 4.2 (26); 6.5 (41)	Q1; Q2; Q3; Final	1.1 (7); 3.7 (25); 3.9 (27); 4.9 (33)	Best on ground players: Laela Ebert (SANFLW) & Lisa Steane (WAFLW)
L. Breguet, K. Lee 2, K. Rosenzweig, Z. Venning	Goals	I. Shannon, C. Lindgren, F. Dethlefsen, T. Ferguson
L. Ebert, J. Bates, L. Cutting, Z. Venning, S. Moon, K. Rosenzweig	Best	L. Steane, K. Petrevski, I. Shannon, J. Harken, T. Milder, S. Goranova

== Home-and-away season ==
- Full list of fixtures available here
- Results available here

=== Round 1 ===
	Round 1
Friday 28 March (7:20 pm)	East Perth 2.6 (18)	def. by	Swan Districts 7.6 (48)	Leederville Oval (crowd: 539)
Saturday 29 March (2:10 pm)	Peel Thunder 7.14 (56)	def.	Perth 0.6 (6)	Rushton Park (crowd: 921)
Saturday 29 March (2:10 pm)	South Fremantle 5.3 (33)	def.	East Fremantle 4.6 (30)	Fremantle Oval (crowd: 937)
Saturday 29 March (6:30 pm)	West Perth 3.4 (22)	def. by	Subiaco 7.10 (52)	Arena Joondalup (crowd: 697)
	Bye; Claremont

=== Round 2 ===
	Round 2
Friday 4 April (7:05 pm)	West Perth 1.5 (11)	def. by	Claremont 5.6 (36)	Arena Joondalup (crowd: 593)
Saturday 5 April (12:00 pm)	East Fremantle 6.3 (39)	def.	Peel Thunder 4.2 (26)	East Fremantle Oval (crowd: TBC)
Saturday 5 April (5:00 pm)	Perth 1.1 (7)	def. by	South Fremantle 6.14 (50)	Mineral Resources Park (crowd: TBC)
Sunday 6 April (11:50 am)	Subiaco 7.6 (48)	def.	East Perth 3.2 (20)	Leederville Oval (crowd: 340)
	Bye; Swan Districts

=== Round 3 ===
	Round 3
Friday 11 April (7:00 pm)	West Perth 10.13 (73)	def.	Perth 2.2 (14)	Arena Joondalup (crowd: 793)
Saturday 12 April (2:10 pm)	Swan Districts 1.7 (13)	def. by	Subiaco 5.7 (37)	Bassendean Oval (crowd: TBC)
Saturday 12 April (4:30 pm)	South Fremantle 5.8 (38)	def.	Peel Thunder 3.5 (23)	Fremantle Oval (crowd: TBC)
Saturday 12 April (5:10 pm)	Claremont 7.6 (48)	def.	East Fremantle 5.7 (37)	Claremont Oval (crowd: 222)
	Bye; East Perth

=== Round 4 ===
	Round 4
Friday 18 April (1:10 pm)	Claremont 7.5 (47)	def.	South Fremantle 4.1 (25)	Claremont Oval (crowd: TBC)
Saturday 19 April (11:05 am)	Peel Thunder 4.6 (30)	def. by	Swan Districts 5.7 (37)	Rushton Park (crowd: TBC)
Saturday 19 April (12:10 pm)	Perth 5.3 (33)	def. by	East Perth 6.6 (42)	Lathlain Park (crowd: TBC)
Sunday 20 April (12:10 pm)	East Fremantle 3.2 (20)	def. by	Subiaco 4.10 (34)	East Fremantle Oval (crowd: TBC)
	Bye; West Perth

=== Round 5 ===
	Round 5
Saturday 26 April (12:10 pm)	East Perth 1.4 (10)	def. by	East Fremantle 6.3 (39)	Leederville Oval (crowd: TBC)
Saturday 26 April (12:30 pm)	Swan Districts 6.6 (42)	def.	West Perth 5.7 (37)	Bassendean Oval (crowd: TBC)
Saturday 26 April (2:10 pm)	Peel Thunder 6.6 (42)	def. by	Claremont 10.6 (66)	Rushton Park (crowd: 241)
Saturday 26 April (2:15 pm)	Subiaco 6.11 (47)	def.	South Fremantle 1.4 (10)	Leederville Oval (crowd: TBC)
	Bye; Perth

=== Round 6 ===
	Round 6
Saturday 10 May (11:05 am)	Peel Thunder 1.2 (8)	def. by	West Perth 12.7 (79)	Rushton Park (crowd: TBC)
Saturday 10 May (2:10 pm)	South Fremantle 3.7 (29)	def.	East Perth 1.4 (10)	Fremantle Oval (crowd: 483)
Sunday 11 May (12:10 pm)	East Fremantle 5.2 (32)	def. by	Swan Districts 10.4 (64)	East Fremantle Oval (crowd: TBC)
Sunday 11 May (12:40 pm)	Claremont 11.5 (71)	def.	Perth 4.2 (26)	Claremont Oval (crowd: 453)
	Bye; Subiaco

=== Round 7 ===
	Round 7
Saturday 17 May (12:10 pm)	Subiaco 4.6 (30)	drew with	Claremont 4.6 (30)	Leederville Oval (crowd: TBC)
Saturday 17 May (2:15 pm)	East Perth 3.6 (24)	def. by	Peel Thunder 6.9 (45)	Leederville Oval (crowd: 847)
Saturday 17 May (3:40 pm)	Swan Districts 7.5 (47)	def.	Perth 4.4 (28)	Bassendean Oval (crowd: 440)
Saturday 17 May (6:00 pm)	West Perth 3.10 (28)	def.	East Fremantle 2.1 (13)	Arena Joondalup (crowd: TBC)
	Bye; South Fremantle

=== Round 8 ===
	Round 8
Saturday 24 May (5:00 pm)	Perth 8.3 (51)	def. by	West Perth 8.8 (56)	Lathlain Park (crowd: TBC)
Saturday 24 May (5:30 pm)	Claremont 10.9 (69)	def.	East Perth 0.2 (2)	Claremont Oval (crowd: 440)
Sunday 25 May (12:10 pm)	South Fremantle 6.3 (39)	def. by	Swan Districts 8.5 (53)	Fremantle Oval (crowd: 311)
Sunday 25 May (1:10 pm)	Subiaco 13.6 (84)	def.	Peel Thunder 0.1 (1)	Leederville Oval (crowd: 107)
	Bye; East Fremantle

=== Round 9 ===
	Round 9
Friday 30 May (5:10 pm)	East Fremantle 3.3 (21)	def.	South Fremantle 1.6 (12)	East Fremantle Oval (crowd: TBC)
Saturday 31 May (12:10 pm)	Perth 3.3 (21)	def. by	Subiaco 6.2 (38)	Lathlain Park (crowd: TBC)
Saturday 31 May (12:30 pm)	Swan Districts 2.6 (18)	def. by	Claremont 8.3 (51)	Bassendean Oval (crowd: TBC)
Saturday 31 May (5:15 pm)	East Perth 2.2 (14)	def. by	West Perth 6.5 (41)	Leederville Oval (crowd: 369)
	Bye; Peel Thunder

=== Round 10 ===
	Round 10
Saturday 7 June (11:05 am)	Subiaco 5.10 (40)	def.	Swan Districts 3.1 (19)	Sullivan Logistics Stadium (crowd: TBC)
Saturday 7 June (2:10 pm)	South Fremantle 1.8 (14)	def.	West Perth 1.4 (10)	Fremantle Community Bank Oval (crowd: 541)
Saturday 7 June (3:10 pm)	Claremont 8.10 (58)	def.	Peel Thunder 2.5 (17)	Revo Fitness Stadium (crowd: 427)
Sunday 8 June (12:10 pm)	East Fremantle 4.10 (34)	def.	Perth 3.2 (20)	The Good Grocer Park (crowd: TBC)
	Bye; East Perth

=== Round 11 ===
	Round 11
Friday 13 June (7:00 pm)	Subiaco 5.10 (40)	def.	East Fremantle 4.4 (28)	Sullivan Logistics Stadium (crowd: TBC)
Saturday 14 June (3:00 pm)	Peel Thunder 5.9 (39)	def.	East Perth 1.7 (13)	Lane Group Stadium (crowd: TBC)
Saturday 14 June (7:00 pm)	West Perth 3.3 (21)	def. by	Swan Districts 8.6 (54)	Arena Joondalup (crowd: TBC)
Sunday 15 June (12;10 pm)	South Fremantle 3.4 (22)	def. by	Perth 5.4 (34)	Fremantle Community Bank Oval (crowd: 474)
	Bye; Claremont

=== Round 12 ===
	Round 12
Saturday 21 June (2:10 pm)	South Fremantle 7.6 (48)	def.	Subiaco 0.5 (5)	Fremantle Community Bank Oval (crowd: 377)
Saturday 21 June (3:40 pm)	West Perth 5.10 (40)	def.	Peel Thunder 1.1 (7)	Arena Joondalup (crowd: TBC)
Saturday 21 June (3:40 pm)	Perth 2.1 (13)	def. by	Claremont 4.10 (34)	Mineral Resources Park (crowd: TBC)
Sunday 22 June (12:10 pm)	East Fremantle 6.6 (42)	def.	East Perth 2.1 (13)	The Good Grocer Park (crowd: TBC)
	Bye; Swan Districts

=== Round 13 ===
	Round 13
Friday 27 June (7:20 pm)	East Perth 0.1 (1)	def. by	South Fremantle 8.13 (61)	Sullivan Logistics Stadium (crowd: TBC)
Saturday 28 June (2:10 pm)	Peel Thunder 1.3 (9)	def. by	Subiaco 9.8 (62)	Lane Group Stadium (crowd: 255)
Saturday 28 June (3:10 pm)	Claremont 6.2 (38)	def.	Swan Districts 4.5 (29)	Revo Fitness Stadium (crowd: 460)
Sunday 29 June (12:10 pm)	East Fremantle 6.4 (40)	def.	West Perth 4.4 (28)	The Good Grocer Park (crowd: TBC)
	Bye; Perth

=== Round 14 ===
	Round 14
Saturday 5 July (11:05 pm)	Peel Thunder 0.1 (1)	def. by	East Fremantle 9.11 (65)	Lane Group Stadium (crowd: TBC)
Saturday 5 July (12:10 pm)	Subiaco 8.7 (55)	def.	Perth 2.0 (12)	Sullivan Logistics Stadium (crowd: TBC)
Saturday 5 July (2:10 pm)	Swan Districts 15.12 (102)	def.	East Perth 0.1 (1)	Steel Blue Oval (crowd: 470)
Saturday 5 July (3:45 pm)	South Fremantle 5.5 (35)	def.	Claremont 3.5 (23)	Fremantle Community Bank Oval (crowd: TBC)
	Bye; West Perth

=== Round 15 ===
	Round 15
Friday 11 July (7:30 pm)	West Perth 5.12 (42)	def.	East Perth 1.3 (9)	Arena Joondalup (crowd: 551)
Sunday 13 July (12:10 pm)	East Fremantle 4.6 (30)	def.	Claremont 3.0 (18)	The Good Grocer Park (crowd: TBC)
Sunday 13 July (12:10 pm)	Perth 5.12 (42)	def.	Peel Thunder 3.1 (19)	Mineral Resources Park (crowd: TBC)
Sunday 13 July (2:10 pm)	Swan Districts 5.4 (34)	def.	South Fremantle 4.4 (28)	Steel Blue Oval (crowd: 471)
	Bye; Subiaco

=== Round 16 ===
	Round 16
Saturday 19 July (12:10 pm)	East Perth 1.3 (9)	def. by	Claremont 14.8 (92)	Sullivan Logistics Stadium (crowd: 603)
Saturday 19 July (2:10 pm)	Swan Districts 12.10 (82)	def.	Peel Thunder 2.2 (14)	Steel Blue Oval (crowd: TBC)
Saturday 19 July (2:10 pm)	Subiaco 3.9 (27)	def. by	West Perth 4.5 (29)	Sullivan Logistics Stadium (crowd: TBC)
Saturday 19 July (5:00 pm)	Perth 3.1 (19)	def. by	East Fremantle 10.4 (64)	Mineral Resources Park (crowd: TBC)
	Bye; South Fremantle

=== Round 17 ===
	Round 17
Friday 25 July (7:15 pm)	East Perth 0.1 (1)	def. by	Subiaco 10.5 (65)	Sullivan Logistics Stadium (crowd: 280)
Saturday 26 July (1:00 pm)	Peel Thunder 5.2 (32)	def.	South Fremantle 1.12 (18)	Lane Group Stadium (crowd: 274)
Saturday 26 July (3:10 pm)	Claremont 5.6 (36)	def.	West Perth 3.8 (26)	Revo Fitness Stadium (crowd: TBC)
Sunday 27 July (12:10 pm)	Perth 3.6 (24)	def. by	Swan Districts 6.5 (41)	Mineral Resources Park (crowd: TBC)
	Bye; East Fremantle

=== Round 18 ===
	Round 18
Friday 1 August (7:35 pm)	West Perth 8.7 (55)	def.	South Fremantle 6.7 (43)	Arena Joondalup (crowd: TBC)
Saturday 2 August (12:10 pm)	East Perth 3.5 (23)	def. by	Perth 7.7 (49)	Sullivan Logistics Stadium (crowd: TBC)
Sunday 3 August (12:40 pm)	Claremont 4.10 (34)	def.	Subiaco 0.1 (1)	Revo Fitness Stadium (crowd: 365)
Sunday 3 August (2:10 pm)	Swan Districts 2.3 (15)	def.	East Fremantle 1.5 (11)	Steel Blue Oval (crowd: 320)
	Bye; Peel Thunder

== Ladder ==
Pos	Team	Pld	W	L	D	PF	PA	PP	Pts	Qualification
1	Claremont	16	13	2	1	751	351	214.0	54	Finals series
2	Subiaco	16	12	3	1	665	317	209.8	50	Finals series
3	Swan Districts	16	12	4	0	698	449	155.5	48	Finals series
4	East Fremantle	16	9	7	0	545	409	133.3	36	Finals series
5	West Perth	16	9	7	0	598	460	130.0	36	
6	South Fremantle	16	8	8	0	501	432	116.0	32	
7	Peel Thunder	16	4	12	0	369	753	49.0	16	
8	Perth	16	3	13	0	399	725	55.0	12	
9	East Perth	16	1	15	0	210	840	25.0	4	

Updated to match(es) played on 3 August 2025. Source: WAFL
Rules for classification: 1) points; 2) percentage; 3) number of points for.

== Finals series ==
=== Semi-finals ===
	First Semi-Final
Sunday 10 August (12:30 pm)	Claremont 4.5 (29)	def.	Subiaco 4.4 (28)	Revo Fitness Stadium (crowd: 872)	Report
The game was tied at full time and was won by Claremont in extra time.

	Second Semi-Final
Sunday 10 August (1:30 pm)	Swan Districts 2.4 (16)	def.	East Fremantle 2.3 (15)	Steel Blue Oval (crowd: 814)	Report

=== Preliminary final ===
	Preliminary Final
Sunday 17 August (12:30 pm)	Subiaco 6.2 (38)	def. by	Swan Districts 6.4 (40)	Sullivan Logistics Stadium (crowd: 1,028)	Report

=== Grand Final ===
2025 WAFLW Grand Final
Sunday 24 August 2025 (2:05 pm)	Claremont	def.	Swan Districts	Mineral Resources Park (crowd: 2,920)
1.1 (7); 2.4 (16); 3.6 (24); 3.6 (24)	Q1; Q2; Q3; Final	0.3 (3); 1.3 (9); 2.5 (17); 3.5 (23)	Umpires: A Cooper, E Moles, C Giglia-Smith; Lou Knitter Medal (Best on ground): Jayme Harken (Claremont); Television broadcast: Seven Network
S Viney, M Sergeant, R Ortlepp 1	Goals	S Yarran 3
J Harken, M Sergeant, M Webb, J Kelly, S Viney	Best	C D’Addario, S Yarran J Henry, E Gelmi, S Adjuk

== Awards ==
- Dhara Kerr Award

Krstel Petrevski (Subiaco) − 26 votes

- WAFLW Joanne Huggins Leading Goal Kicker Award

Taylah Edwards (Swan Districts)

- WAFLW Cath Boyce Rising Star Award

Lexi Strachan (West Perth)

- WAFLW Coach of the Year

Jack Schwarze (Claremont)

- Rogers Cup Fairest and Best

Madison Hadley (South Fremantle)

- Rogers Cup Leading Goal Kicker

Keira Fawcett (Swan Districts)

- Rogers Cup Premiers

West Perth

== See also ==
- 2025 WAFL season
