= Sam Sturt =

Australian rules footballer (born 2000)

Personal information
- Full name: Samuel Sturt
- Born: 12 May 2000 (age 26)
- Original team: Dandenong Stingrays (TAC Cup)
- Draft: No. 17, 2018 National draft, Fremantle
- Debut: Round 1, 2020, Fremantle vs. Essendon, at Marvel Stadium
- Height: 189 cm (6 ft 2 in)
- Weight: 72 kg (159 lb)
- Position: Forward

Club information
- Current club: Fremantle
- Number: 1

Playing career^{1}
Years	Club	Games (Goals)
2019–2026	Fremantle	31 (43)
- ^{1} Playing statistics correct to the end of the 2026 season.

Career highlights
- AFL Rising Star nomination: 2020

Sam Sturt (born 12 May 2000) is a former Australian rules footballer who played for the Fremantle Football Club in the Australian Football League (AFL).

Drafted with the 17th selection in the 2018 AFL draft from the Dandenong Stingrays in the TAC Cup, Sturt had mainly played cricket as a junior. He attended Peninsula Grammar.

== AFL career ==
=== Fremantle (2019-2026) ===
==== Early Career (2019-2022) ====
Upon moving to Fremantle, he played for Peel Thunder in the West Australian Football League (WAFL), Fremantle's reserve team, however he missed two months of football after suffering two concussion injuries early in the 2019 season.

Sturt made his AFL debut for Fremantle in the opening round of the 2020 AFL season at Marvel Stadium against Essendon. He earned a Rising Star nomination after kicking three goals and amassing 10 disposals in the match.

Sturt played just one game during the 2021 AFL season after struggling with injuries, and spent the entire 2022 AFL season playing for Peel in the WAFL. He played 17 matches and kicked 26 goals for Peel. Sturt signed a one-year contract extension at the end of the season to keep him at Fremantle until the end of 2023.

==== 2023 season ====
In Round 5 of the 2023 AFL season Sturt made his return to the AFL in a game at Norwood Oval against Gold Coast. Sturt gained 6 disposals and 4 marks. He helped in a tight contest which resulted in a 10 point win for Fremantle. Sturt kept his spot in the team for Fremantle’s next game against the Western Bulldogs. Sturt used this opportunity to kick 2 goals in a disappointing loss at home. Those goals kept him in the side leading up to Fremantle’s clash with the Brisbane Lions. Unfortunately for Sturt his game against Brisbane would end quickly due to being substituted out in the 3rd Quarter. After playing 3 games for Fremantle’s WAFL side, Peel Thunder, Sturt returned to the senior team for a big game against Melbourne. Sturt started as the substitute but came in quickly due to ruckman, Sean Darcy, tearing a hamstring in the 2nd Quarter. Sturt finished the game with only 5 disposals, however Fremantle still got the win. Sturt returned to the starting lineup in Round 13. However Sturt was quiet, collecting only 7 disposals and kicking a goal in a 15 point loss to Richmond at home. The next week ahead of Fremantle’s clash against the Giants Sturt was named as an emergency. However due to Michael Frederick failing a fitness test minutes before the game, Sturt was back into the side. Sturt kicked 2 goals and had 9 disposals in a good game for him but a not so good game for the Dockers who would end up losing by 70 points. The next week Sturt was named as the substitute. Sturt was subbed into the game for Alex Pearce who suffered an injury in the 4th quarter. Sturt was on the ground for just below 19 minutes. In this time he gained 3 disposals, had 2 tackles, and took a mark in a 32 point win against Essendon in the west. After a couple games playing for Fremantle‘s reserve side in the WAFL, Sturt returned to the top team in Round 18 against Collingwood. Sturt played well in his return game kicking 2 goals and having 8 disposals. Round 21 saw Sturt kick 3 goals during Fremantle's 3 point loss to the Brisbane Lions. Western Derby 57 saw Sturt kick a career high four goals during Fremantle's 101 point win over West Coast at Optus Stadium. Sturt signed a one-year contract extension during the 2023 season, tying him to Fremantle until at least 2024. In Round 24 Sturt kicked a goal in a 37 point thrashing of Hawthorn to finish his most successful season in the AFL thus far.

==== 2024 season ====
Following a breakout season in 2023, Sturt was surprisingly unable to break back into the Fremantle senior side, with only one match played in the first 10 rounds of the 2024 AFL season. However, once he did he continued right where he left off kicking 11.2 in his first 5 games. A highlight of this form being his equal game high 3.1 and 12 disposals during Fremantle's one point win over the top of the ladder team Sydney in round 16. After speculation Sturt was considering a move to an eastern states based club, he signed a two-year contract extension in September to remain at the Dockers until at least 2026.

==== 2025 season ====
During a pre-season match simulation in January, Sturt tackled teammate Cooper Simpson and appeared in pain as play moved on. It turned out that he had flared up a long standing knee issue. This caused him to miss the first half of the season. Sturt came back and played 2 WAFL games in July before falling to another knee injury. This put him out for the remainder of the year. Overall, 2025 was difficult year for Sturt, playing no AFL games in 2025 and only 2 WAFL games, due to the knee injuries. Following successive knee injuries, Sturt underwent a knee reconstruction in August 2025.

2026 season

2026 was another injury interrupted year, managing only 2 WAFL league games and 1 WAFL reserves game. At one point, he was the only player on Fremantle's injury list. In the end, he was delisted, having only managed 31 AFL games.

==== WAFL Statistics ====
Updated to the end of the 2025 season.

Legend
G	Goals	K	Kicks	D	Disposals	T	Tackles
B	Behinds	H	Handballs	M	Marks

Season	Team	No.	Games	Totals							Averages (per game)						
Season	Team	No.	Games	G	B	K	H	D	M	T	G	B	K	H	D	M	T
2019	Peel Thunder	37	12	6	6	73	84	157	43	31	0.5	0.5	6.0	7.0	12.8	3.5	2.5
2021	Peel Thunder	4	3	11	2	23	16	39	15	7	3.6	0.6	7.6	5.3	13.0	5.0	2.3
2022	Peel Thunder	63	17	26	23	110	76	186	58	31	1.5	1.3	6.5	4.4	10.9	3.4	1.8
2023	Peel Thunder	63	5	7	5	48	50	98	29	19	1.4	1.0	9.6	10.0	19.6	5.8	3.8
2024	Peel Thunder	63	3	6	5	22	18	40	16	7	2.0	1.7	7.3	6.0	13.3	5.3	2.3
2025	Peel Thunder	26	2	1	0	6	13	19	4	4	0.5	0.0	3.0	6.5	9.5	2.0	2.0
Career			42	57	41	282	257	539	165	99	1.4	1.0	6.7	6.1	12.8	3.9	2.4

== Statistics ==
Updated to the end of the 2025 season.

Legend
G	Goals	K	Kicks	D	Disposals	T	Tackles
B	Behinds	H	Handballs	M	Marks

Season	Team	No.	Games	Totals							Averages (per game)							Votes
Season	Team	No.	Games	G	B	K	H	D	M	T	G	B	K	H	D	M	T	Votes
2019	Fremantle	27	0	—	—	—	—	—	—	—	—	—	—	—	—	—	—	0
2020 (Note: The 2020 season was played with 17 home-and-away matches per team (down from 22) and 16-minute quarters with time on (down from 20-minute quarters with time on) due to the impact of the COVID-19 pandemic.)	Fremantle	27	3	4	0	12	11	23	7	3	1.3	0.0	4.0	3.7	7.7	2.3	1.0	0
2021	Fremantle	1	1	1	1	3	2	5	2	0	1.0	1.0	3.0	2.0	5.0	2.0	0.0	0
2022	Fremantle	1	0	—	—	—	—	—	—	—	—	—	—	—	—	—	—	0
2023 (Note: 2023 statistics includes two games when Sturt was used as the substitute (rounds 11 & 15) and one game when Sturt was substituted off (round 7).)	Fremantle	1	14	17	9	65	54	119	45	17	1.2	0.6	4.6	3.9	8.5	3.2	1.2	0
2024	Fremantle	1	13	21	7	68	58	126	39	20	1.6	0.5	5.2	4.5	9.7	3.0	1.5	0
2025	Fremantle	1	0	—	—	—	—	—	—	—	—	—	—	—	—	—	—	0
Career			31	43	17	148	125	273	93	40	1.4	0.5	4.8	4.0	8.8	3.0	1.3	0

== Honours and achievements ==
Individual

- AFL Rising Star nominee: 2020 (round 1)
