= Jake Florenca =

Australian rules footballer (born 1997)

Personal information
- Born: 15 May 1997 (age 29)
- Original teams: South Fremantle (WAFL); South Coogee JFC (Metro South WA)
- Draft: COVID contingency list
- Debut: Round 8, 2022, West Coast vs. Brisbane Lions, at The Gabba
- Height: 184 cm (6 ft 0 in)
- Weight: 86 kg (190 lb)
- Position: Midfielder

Playing career^{1}
Years	Club	Games (Goals)
2022	West Coast	1 (0)
- ^{1} Playing statistics correct to the end of the 2024 season.

Jake Florenca (born 15 May 1997) is an Australian rules footballer who plays for South Fremantle in the West Australian Football League (WAFL) and once played for the West Coast Eagles in the Australian Football League (AFL).

== Football career ==
During 2022, Florenca was listed among 20 players from the West Australian Football League (WAFL) on West Coast's COVID contingency list as a result of the ongoing COVID-19 pandemic. Prior to round 8 of the 2022 season, Florenca was listed as an emergency for the Eagles and set to fly to Brisbane in case a late withdrawal was announced. He received his unexpected chance to play that weekend against the Brisbane Lions at the Gabba as he became one of seven changes made to the Eagles' team that week.

Florenca debuted with 19 disposals and seven tackles in the loss. He was the only senior West Coast player in 2022 to never meet head coach Adam Simpson, who was unavailable to travel to the Gabba in round 8 because of COVID-19 health protocols.

In 2025, Florenca became a premiership playing in the WAFL with South Fremantle when his team defeated East Perth in a narrow Grand Final win. Florenca kicked a goal in the decider held at Optus Stadium. In 2026 he was awarded the Sandover Medal as the fairest and best player in the league for the season.
