= David Corcoran =

Australian rules football umpire

Personal information
- Full name: David Corcoran

Umpiring career
Years	League	Role	Games
1998–2004	WAFL	Field Umpire	115
2001–2003	AFL	Field Umpire	31

David Corcoran is a former Australian rules football umpire who umpired in the Australian Football League.

== Umpiring career ==
=== WAFL ===
Corcoran began his senior umpiring career with the West Australian Football League where he umpired his first league match in 1998. Corcoran umpired 115 WAFL league matches between 1998 and 2004 including four WAFL Grand Finals.

=== AFL ===
Corcoran joined the AFL list in 2001. He umpired 31 AFL matches up to May 2003 when his contract was terminated by the AFL.
