= Tyler Keitel =

Australian rules football player

Personal information
- Full name: Tyler James Keitel
- Born: 7 February 1996 (age 30); Perth, Western Australia
- Original teams: (Noranda JFC), East Perth
- Height: 196 cm (6 ft 5 in)
- Weight: 91 kg (201 lb)
- Position: Key Forward

Club information
- Current club: West Perth
- Number: 37

Playing career^{1}
Years	Club	Games (Goals)
2015–	West Perth	215 (478)

Representative team honours
Years	Team	Games (Goals)
2021—	Western Australia	3 (6)
- ^{1} Playing statistics correct to the end of 2026.

Career highlights
- 8x West Perth leading goalkicker: 2017, 2018, 2020, 2021, 2023, 2024, 2025, 2026; 6x Bernie Naylor Medal: 2018, 2021, 2023, 2024, 2025, 2026; West Perth Best & Fairest: 2019; 2x WAFL Team of the Year; WAFL premiership player: 2022

Tyler Keitel (born 7 February 1996) is a professional Australian rules footballer who plays for the West Perth Football Club in the West Australian Football League (WAFL).

== Early career ==
Keitel started his career playing for East Perth's WAFL Colts team from 2012 to 2014. Keitel nominated for the 2014 AFL national draft but was overlooked by all 18 clubs and did not get signed. After being overlooked in the draft Keitel left East Perth and joined the West Perth Football Club.

== WAFL Career ==
Keitel joined West Perth before the 2015 WAFL season, playing as both a key forward and a key defender. Throughout his career with the Falcons, he has played primarily as a forward. In this role, Keitel has won the Bernie Naylor Medal six times and finished as West Perth's leading goalkicker in eight seasons.

== Statistics ==
Updated to the end of 2023.

Legend
G	Goals	K	Kicks	D	Disposals	T	Tackles
B	Behinds	H	Handballs	M	Marks	H/O	Hit-outs
#	Played in that season's premiership team	†	Led the league for the season

Season	Team	No.	Games	Totals								Averages (per game)							
Season	Team	No.	Games	G	B	K	H	D	M	T	H/O	G	B	K	H	D	M	T	H/O
2015	West Perth	37	14	6	8	102	78	180	57	27	55	0.4	0.6	7.3	5.6	12.9	4.1	1.9	3.9
2016	West Perth	37	21	2	2	253	142	395	105	58	73	0.1	0.1	12.0	6.8	18.8	5.0	2.8	3.5
2017	West Perth	37	21	46	44	227	75	302	109	54	35	2.2	2.1	10.8	3.6	14.4	3.6	5.2	1.7
2018	West Perth	37	22	50^{†}	39	236	61	297	119	41	58	2.3	1.8	10.7	2.8	13.5	5.4	1.9	2.6
2019	West Perth	37	17	25	13	214	90	304	107	64	142	1.5	0.8	12.6	5.3	17.9	6.3	3.8	8.4
2020 (Note: The 2020 season was played with 9 home-and-away matches per team (down from 18) and 16-minute quarters with time on (down from 20-minute quarters with time on) due to the impact of the COVID-19 pandemic.)	West Perth	37	10	25	12	99	32	131	41	26	31	2.5	1.2	9.9	3.2	13.1	4.1	2.6	3.1
2021	West Perth	37	19	70^{†}	34	214	57	271	107	37	39	3.6	0.6	7.6	5.3	13.0	5.0	1.9	2.1
2022^{#}	West Perth	37	19	38	37	225	118	343	114	36	61	1.5	1.3	6.5	4.4	10.9	3.4	1.8	3.2
2023	West Perth	37	18	57^{†}	32	185	66	251	99	38	19	3.2	1.8	10.3	3.7	13.9	5.5	2.1	1.0
Career			161	319	221	1570	719	2474	858	381	477	2.0	1.4	9.8	4.5	15.3	5.3	2.4	3.0
