= Jye Bolton =

Australian rules footballer

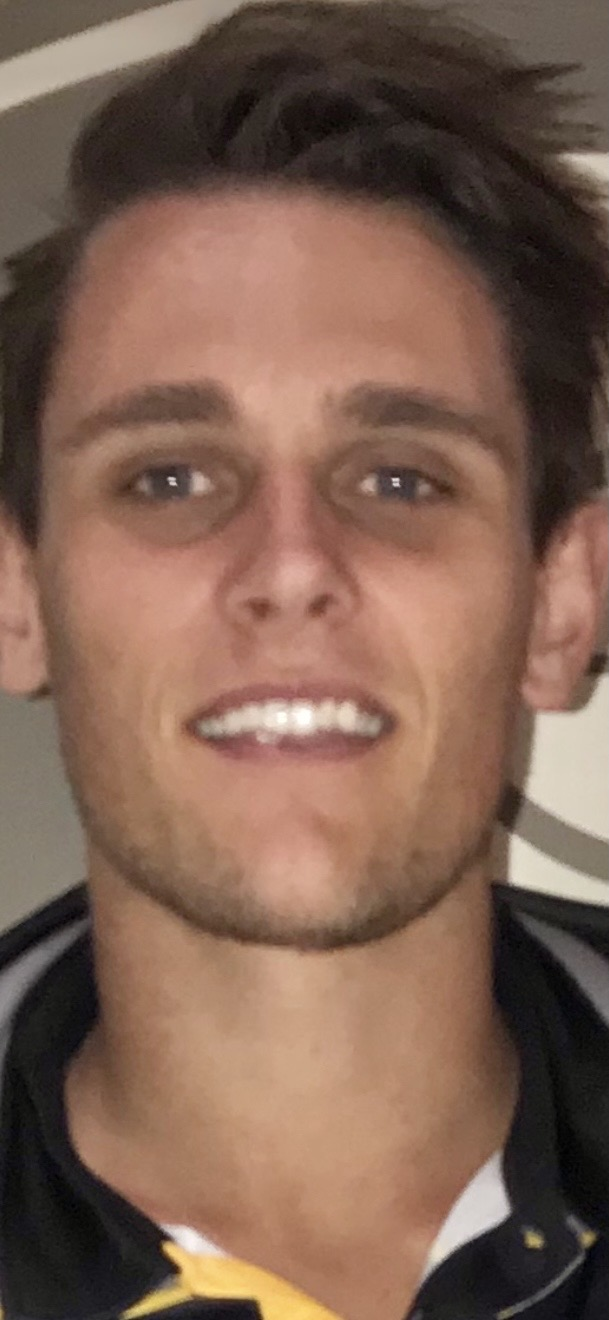
- Bolton after playing for Western Australia in 2018

Personal information
- Full name: Jye David Bolton
- Nicknames: Bolts, Boltzy
- Born: 3 March 1992 (age 34); Geelong, Victoria
- Original team: Drysdale Hawks F.C
- Draft: 2011 AFL rookie draft
- Height: 188 cm (6 ft 2 in)
- Weight: 86 kg (190 lb)
- Position: Midfield player

Club information
- Current club: Claremont
- Number: 11

Playing career^{1}
Years	Club	Games (Goals)
2009–2010, 2012	Leopold	44 (48)
2011	Collingwood (VFL)	16 (15)
2013–2015	Werribee (VFL)	34 (31)
2016–2025	Claremont (WAFL)	192 (94)

Representative team honours^{2}
Years	Team	Games (Goals)
2016–2021	Western Australia	5 (4)
- ^{1} Playing statistics correct to the end of 2025 season.^{2} Representative statistics correct as of 2021.

Career highlights
- Sandover Medal: 2016, 2018; 3x Claremont Best and Fairest/ E.B.Cook Medal: 2016, 2018, 2022 Runner up: 2017, 2020, 2021,2023; Simpson Medal (Best in State Team): 2016, 2018, 2021; Simpson Medal (Best in Grand Final): 2020; 8 x WAFL Team of the Year: 2016–2023; Selected in Claremont Football Club Team of the Century: 2026; Inducted into WAFL 200 Club: August 10th 2023; Awarded Life Membership Claremont Football Club: 2023; Selected into Claremont F C - Team of the Century ( only modern day footballer to be selected) 2026.

Jye Bolton (born 3 March 1992) is an Australian rules footballer who plays for Claremont in the West Australian Football League (WAFL). He previously played for Werribee in the Victorian Football League (VFL). He is a highly rated midfielder known for his contested ball wins, tough endurance, elite running and determination to win the ball. Bolton has won two Sandover Medals, four Simpson medals and three EB Cook medals whilst being runner-up on three occasions also.

Bolton grew up in Geelong, Victoria, and played football for Drysdale Football Club and Leopold Football Club in his early life. He was drafted to Collingwood Football Club as a rookie under Nick Maxwell's high recommendation in the 2011 rookie draft. Bolton played in the VFL for Werribee Football Club from 2012–2015. During this time, he was named in the Victorian Football League Team of the Year in 2014. Bolton was also selected to play for a VFL representative side against Ireland in an International rules practice match in 2014.

Bolton then moved to play with the Claremont Football Club in the West Australian Football League competition in 2016. Since then, he has won the Sandover Medal for the best player in the league twice, in 2016 and 2018. He was also runner-up in the Sandover medal in 2021. He has represented Western Australia six times and received the Simpson Medal four times. He twice won it as the best player on the ground in interstate matches, in 2016 against Tasmania, and in 2018 and 2021 against Adelaide, and also in the 2020 WAFL Grand Final, when he was awarded Best on Ground in a losing team. Bolton is only the seventh person to do so, and the first person in thirty-five years to claim the medal in a team that lost by only three points.

He has also won the EB Cook medal for the Claremont Football Club best and fairest player three times. He has been named in the WAFL Team of the Year eight times from 2016 to 2023. Jye was inducted into the WAFL 200 Club on August 10th 2023. Jye was selected into the Claremont Football Club Team of the Century: 2026.
