= Lathlain Park =

AFL football ground in Western Australia

Lathlain Park Mineral Resources Park
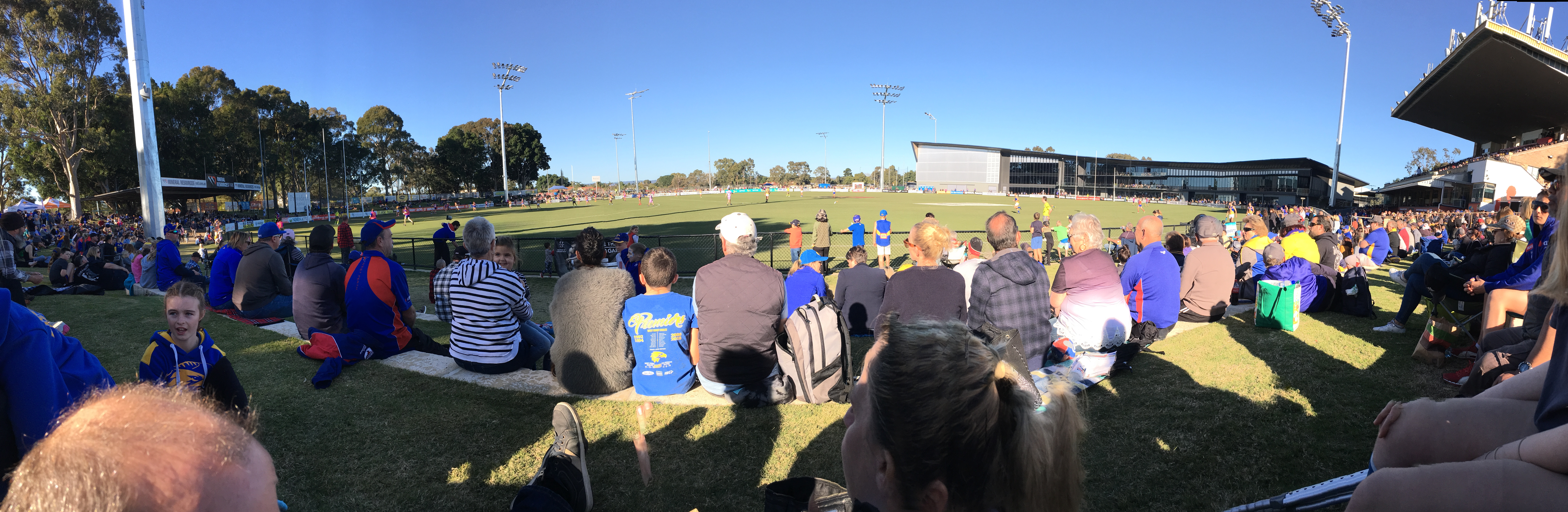
- Lathlain Park in 2019
- Interactive map of Lathlain Park; Mineral Resources Park
- Full name: Lathlain Park Oval
- Former names: Eftel Oval, Brownes Stadium
- Location: Lathlain, Western Australia
- Coordinates: 31°58′21″S 115°54′27″E
- Owner: Town of Victoria Park
- Capacity: 6,500
- Surface: Grass
- Scoreboard: Electronic
- Record attendance: 19,541 (1967)

Construction
- Built: 1959
- Opened: 25 August 1959

Tenants
- Perth Football Club (WAFL) (1959–present); West Coast Eagles (AFL) Administration & training (2019–present); (AFLW, WAFL) (2019–present)
- Lathlain Park (Perth)

Lathlain Park (also known as Mineral Resources Park under ground sponsorship arrangements) is an Australian rules football ground, located in Lathlain, an inner-eastern suburb of Perth, Western Australia. Since its opening in 1959, it has been the home ground for the Perth Football Club of the West Australian Football League (WAFL). Since 2019 it has been the administrative and training headquarters of professional Australian Football League (AFL) club the West Coast Eagles.

== Naming rights ==
The venue was known as Lathlain Park until 2003 when the naming rights were sold to Eftel, an internet company, for a period of five years or more.

In 2011, Eftel decided not to renew their contract, which gave Western Australian dairy company Brownes the naming rights of Lathlain Park, and so for the next three years its sponsored name was Brownes Stadium.

In 2019, the naming rights were sold to mining company Mineral Resources for an undisclosed amount, as AFL club the West Coast Eagles moved to the ground permanently for training and administration.

== History ==
The oval is primarily used for Australian rules football and has been the home ground of Perth in the West Australian Football League (WAFL) since 1959 (with the exception of 1987 and 1988 when they played home matches at the WACA Ground). The ground record attendance of 19,541 people was set in round 6 of the 1967 WANFL season for the rematch of the 1966 Grand Final between Perth and East Perth. The redevelopment of the ground to cater for the West Coast Eagles reduced the capacity from 15,000 to 6,500 patrons.

Lathlain Park was also used by the Sunday Football League (SFL) for Australian football as the headquarters for their league and as a home ground for South Perth Raiders in the SFL. The ground has also occasionally been used for rugby league matches. On 17 February 1977, the ground hosted an Amco Cup game between Western Australia and the Northern Territory, the locals winning 23-18. The next time the ground was used for rugby league was 10 years later when two matches of the 1987 National Panasonic Cup were held there. Western Australia defeated South Australia 18-16 on 5 April, before following that a week later with a 28-10 win against Victoria. In 1999, the ground hosted its only rugby league premiership match, with Melbourne defeating Wests 64-6.

In September 2013 Australian Football League (AFL) team West Coast Eagles entered into a Heads of Agreement (HOA) with the Town of Victoria Park to develop a new home for the club at Lathlain Park with plans to build a $50 million club training and administration facility on the site of the oval. The eventual cost of the completed project ended up being $60 million. Construction began on the main building in 2017.

The Eagles began moving their training and administration base from the Subiaco Oval, where it had been based since 1987, into the new upgraded facility at Lathlain Park in 2019. The upgraded facility features two ovals, one the size of the Melbourne Cricket Ground and the other the size of Perth Stadium (the home ground of the Eagles), a running track, indoor training field, a gymnasium, swimming and recovery pools, elite medical and function facilities, a West Coast Eagles Football Club museum, public cafe and administrative offices. The facility also houses the Waalitj Foundation. The Perth Football Club continue to play home matches at the venue.

== See also ==
- List of sports venues named after individuals
