= Arena Joondalup =

Sports complex in Western Australia

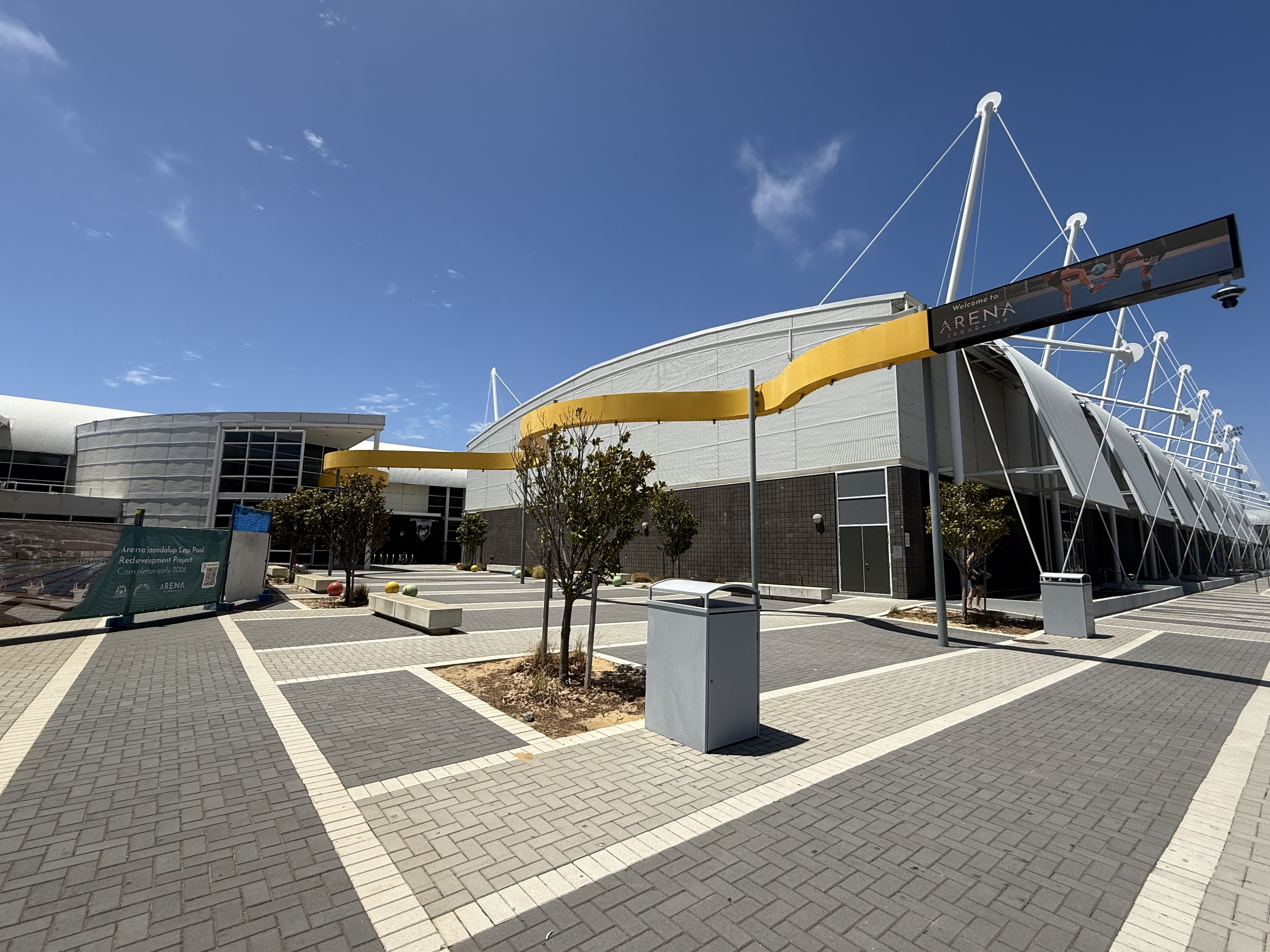
- Main entrance, January 2025
- Interactive map of Arena Joondalup
- Former names: HBF Arena (2014–2024)
- Location: Kennedya Drive, Joondalup, Western Australia
- Coordinates: 31°44′3″S 115°45′47″E
- Owner: Government of Western Australia
- Operator: VenuesWest
- Capacity: 16,000
- Record attendance: 15,082 (1994)

Construction
- Groundbreaking: 1993
- Opened: 1994
- Architects: Cox Architects & Planners

Tenants
- West Perth Falcons (WAFL) (1994–present); Joondalup Wolves (NBL1 West) (2018–present)

Website
- arenajoondalup.com.au

Arena Joondalup is a multi-purpose sports complex in Joondalup, Western Australia, located on 35 hectares (86 acres) of parkland approximately 25 kilometres (16 mi) north of Perth.

Opened in 1994, Arena Joondalup is a super complex with many facilities including an outdoor sports ground which can host Australian rules football, rugby, and soccer; an indoor arena which can host sports such as basketball and netball; a swimming and aquatic centre; and a hockey facility.

The main sports ground is home to the West Perth Football Club. The club moved to Arena Joondalup in 1994. In 2018, the club secured a deal that allowed it to sell the naming rights of the ground for Falcons home games and general club dealings. The ground is currently known as HIF Health Insurance Oval and has a capacity of 16,000 people.

== History ==
Arena Joondalup was opened in 1994. The complex was developed by LandCorp as part of the overall Joondalup City project. In 1997, the Western Australian Sports Centre Trust took over ownership and on-going management of Arena Joondalup on behalf of the State Government. An $11 million indoor aquatic centre, including a 50-metre (160 ft) 10-lane competition pool, was completed in 2000.

As the home stadium of the West Perth Football Club since 1994, Arena Joondalup is most notably an Australian rules football venue. It became the home of Perth RedStar FC (then known as Joondalup City SC) from 1995. The Joondalup Giants rugby league club moved to the Arena in 2008. Arena Joondalup was also one of the home grounds for the Perth Spirit team in the National Rugby Championship in 2014. In 2018, the Joondalup Wolves of the NBL1 West moved into Arena Joondalup after playing out of Joondalup Basketball Stadium for more than three decades.

From 1999 to 2012, Arena Joondalup was host to the Rock-It musical festival, which was one of the major rock concerts held regularly in Perth, with attendances of up to 25,000 people.

In August 2023, Arena Joondalup was the host venue of the NBL1 National Finals.

Between 2014 and 2024, Arena Joondalup was known commercially as HBF Arena. On 1 January 2025, the venue reverted to its original name, Arena Joondalup.

In January 2025, Arena Joondalup hosted global musical acts Ice Spice and Fisher for Wildlands Festival.

Arena Joondalup's sports facilities

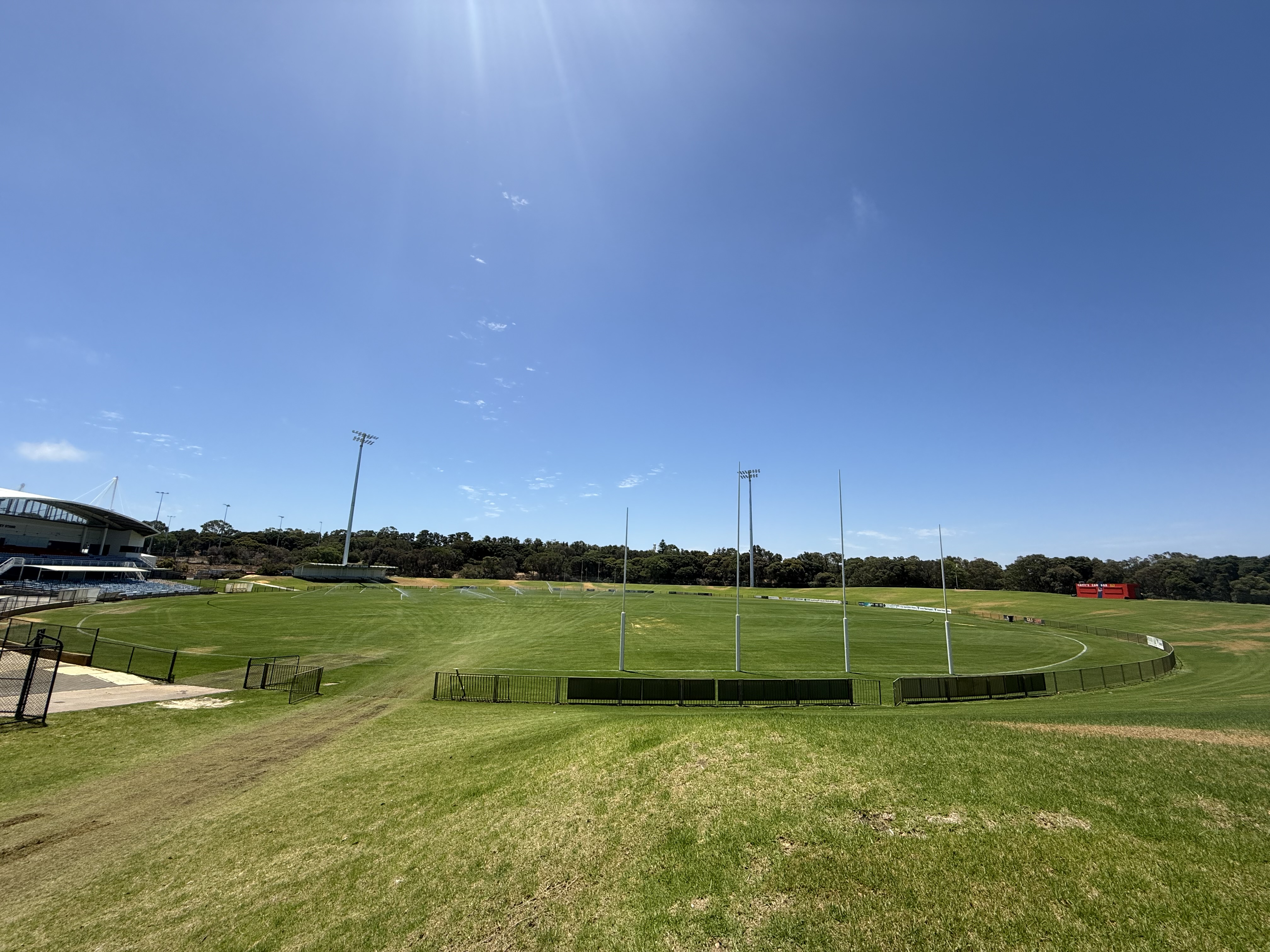
Football oval

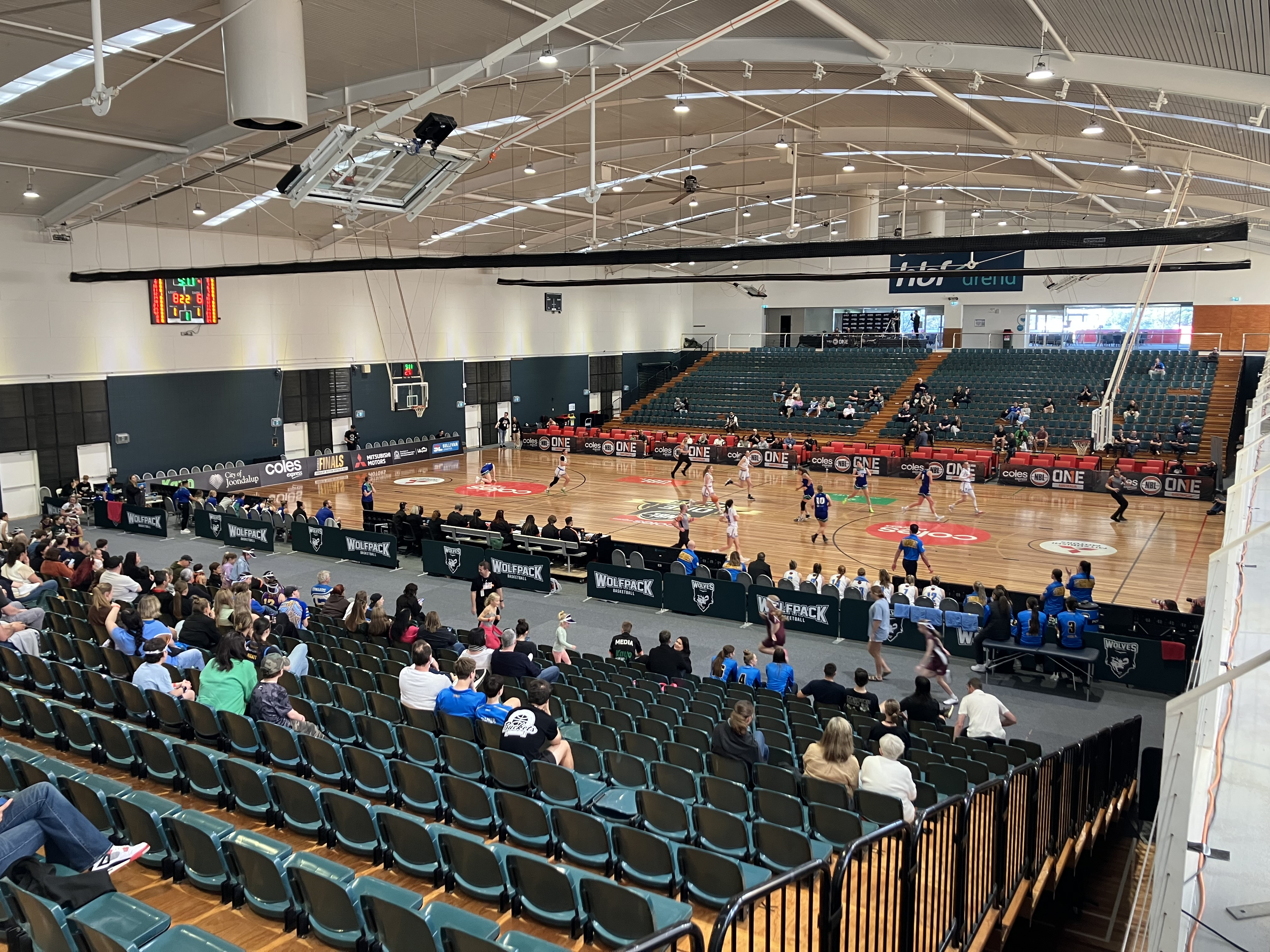
Indoor show court

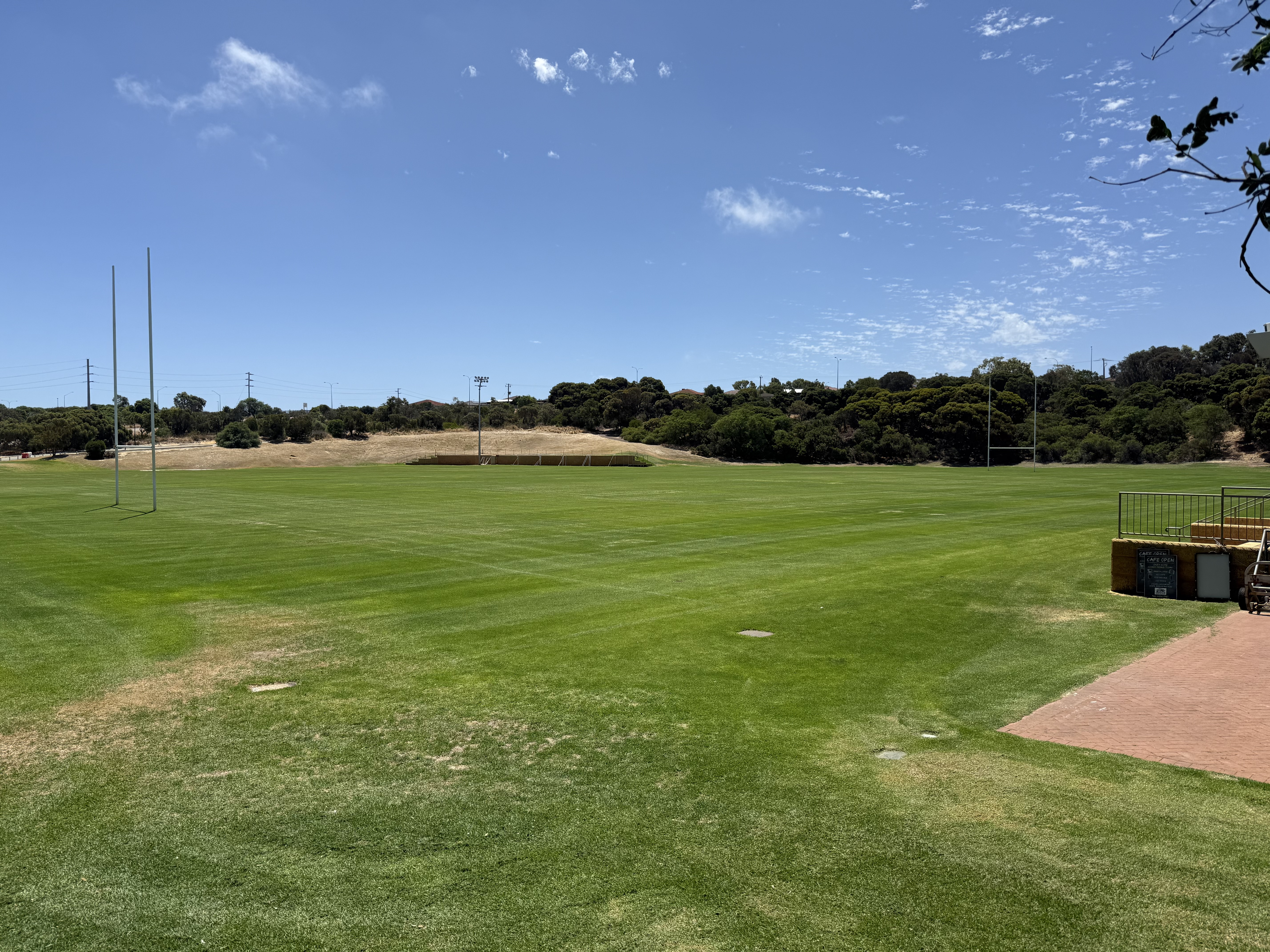
Rugby field

== Awards ==
Arena Joondalup was awarded the 'Facility Management Award' at the 2001 Sport and Recreation Industry Awards.
