= 2014 WAFL season =

Australian rules football season

- Teams: 9
- Premiers: Subiaco; 12th premiership
- Minor premiers: East Perth; 18th minor premiership
- Sandover Medallist: Aaron Black; West Perth (47 votes)
- Bernie Naylor Medallist: Ben Saunders; South Fremantle (59 goals)

Attendance
- Matches played: 94
- Total attendance: 198,699 (2,114 per match)
- Highest: 11,987 (Grand Final, East Perth vs. Subiaco)

The 2014 WAFL season was the 130th season of the various incarnations of the West Australian Football League (WAFL). The season began on 22 March 2014 and concluded on 21 September 2014 with the 2014 WAFL Grand Final. West Perth entered the season as reigning premiers after defeating East Perth by 49 points in the 2013 WAFL Grand Final at Patersons Stadium.

The 2014 season was the first to feature Western Australia’s professional AFL clubs West Coast and Fremantle engage in direct alignments with East Perth and Peel Thunder respectively.

Subiaco were the premiers for the 2014 season, after they defeated favourites East Perth by 16 points at Patersons Stadium.

== Clubs ==
| Club | Home ground | Location | 2013 season |
|---|---|---|---|
| Claremont | Claremont Showground | Claremont | 17-3 (Preliminary final) |
| East Fremantle | East Fremantle Oval | East Fremantle | 11-9 (DNQ Finals) |
| East Perth | Leederville Oval | Leederville | 12-8 (Runners up) |
| Peel Thunder | Rushton Park | Mandurah | 3-17 (DNQ Finals) |
| Perth | Lathlain Park | Lathlain | 10-10 (DNQ Finals) |
| South Fremantle | Fremantle Oval | Fremantle | 6-14 (DNQ Finals) |
| Subiaco | Leederville Oval | Leederville | 6-14 (DNQ Finals) |
| Swan Districts | Bassendean Oval | Bassendean | 12-8 (semi-final) |
| West Perth | Arena Joondalup | Joondalup | 13-7 (Premiers) |

== Premiership season fixtures ==
Source: WAFL 2014 season fixtures and results

=== Round 1 ===
| | Round 1 |
| Sat, 22 March 2:05 PM | East Fremantle 11.7 (73) | def. by | West Perth 10.10 (70) | East Fremantle Oval (crowd: 2563) |
| Sat, 22 March 2:05 PM | Peel Thunder 9.10 (64) | def. by | East Perth 12.11 (83) | Rushton Park (crowd: 2242) |
| Sat, 22 March 2:05 PM | Perth 19.10 (124) | def. | Claremont 9.5 (59) | Lathlain Park (crowd: 1885) |
| Sat, 22 March 4:05 PM | Subiaco 17.9 (111) | def. | South Fremantle 9.19 (73) | Leederville Oval (crowd: 1712) |
| | Bye; Swan Districts |

After their big win, Perth found themselves on top of the ladder for the first time since the corresponding fixture of 2008. Over the next 22 rounds of football the Demons occupied all nine spots on the WAFL league ladder, becoming the first team to achieve this. Their ladder positions after each round were 1, 2, 3, 4, 6, 6, 4, 5, 6, 6, 7, 6, 7, 7, 7, 8, 8, 8, 9, 9, 9, 9, 9.

=== Round 2 ===
| | Round 2 |
| Fri, 28 March 7:00 PM | South Fremantle 18.10 (118) | def. by | Perth 19.9 (123) | Fremantle Oval (crowd: 1978) |
| Sat, 29 March 2:05 PM | West Perth 8.10 (58) | def. by | Claremont 10.10 (70) | Arena Joondalup (crowd: 1610) |
| Sat, 29 March 2:05 PM | East Fremantle 6.16 (52) | def. by | Subiaco 16.12 (108) | Geraldton (crowd: 2280) |
| Sat, 29 March 2:05 PM | East Perth 16.13 (109) | def. | Swan Districts 14.7 (91) | Leederville Oval (crowd: 1975) |
| | Bye; Peel Thunder |

=== Round 3 ===
| | Round 3 |
| Fri, 4 April 6:20 PM | South Fremantle 8.5 (53) | def. by | East Perth 20.8 (128) | Fremantle Oval (crowd: 1692) |
| Sat, 5 April 12:30 PM | Claremont 6.14 (50) | def. by | Subiaco 18.22 (130) | East Fremantle Oval (crowd: 1087) |
| Sat, 5 April 2:05 PM | Swan Districts 16.18 (114) | def. | Peel Thunder 11.13 (79) | Bassendean Oval (crowd: 1288) |
| Sat, 5 April 2:05 PM | West Perth 15.13 (103) | def. | Perth 13.7 (85) | Arena Joondalup (crowd: 1915) |
| | Bye; East Fremantle |

=== Round 4 ===
| | Round 4 |
| Sat, 12 April 2:05 PM | East Fremantle 21.11 (137) | def. | Claremont 9.8 (62) | East Fremantle Oval (crowd: 1529) |
| Sat, 12 April 2:05 PM | East Perth 7.7 (49) | def. by | West Perth 22.17 (149) | Leederville Oval (crowd: 2294) |
| Sat, 12 April 2:05 PM | Peel Thunder 13.10 (88) | def. by | Subiaco 16.9 (105) | Rushton Park (crowd: 1484) |
| Sat, 12 April 2:05 PM | Swan Districts 13.16 (94) | def. | South Fremantle 11.15 (81) | Bassendean Oval (crowd: 1725) |
| | Bye; Perth |

=== Round 5 ===
| | Round 5 |
| Fri, 18 April 2:05 PM | Peel Thunder 10.8 (68) | def. by | East Fremantle 12.14 (86) | Rushton Park (crowd: 2235) |
| Fri, 18 April 4:05 PM | Subiaco 16.10 (106) | def. | East Perth 12.10 (82) | Leederville Oval (crowd: 3440) |
| Sat, 19 April 2:05 PM | West Perth 10.15 (75) | def. by | South Fremantle 15.8 (98) | Arena Joondalup (crowd: 1690) |
| Sun, 20 April 2:05 PM | Perth 13.13 (91) | def. by | Swan Districts 14.8 (92) | Lathlain Park (crowd: 2286) |
| | Bye; Claremont |

=== Round 6 ===
| | Round 6 |
| Fri, 25 April 2:45 PM | Swan Districts 11.9 (75) | def. | West Perth 9.14 (68) | Bassendean Oval (crowd: 2656) |
| Fri, 25 April 3:00 PM | East Fremantle 9.12 (66) | def. by | South Fremantle 13.5 (83) | East Fremantle Oval (crowd: 3421) |
| Sat, 26 April 2:05 PM | East Perth 14.14 (98) | def. | Perth 11.10 (76) | Leederville Oval (crowd: 1331) |
| Sun, 26 April 2:05 PM | Claremont 15.12 (102) | def. | Peel Thunder 11.8 (74) | Claremont Showground (crowd: 1408) |
| | Bye; Subiaco |

=== Round 7 ===
| | Round 7 |
| Sat, 3 May 2:05 PM | East Fremantle 9.11 (65) | def. by | East Perth 11.9 (75) | East Fremantle Oval (crowd: 1673) |
| Sat, 3 May 2:05 PM | Peel Thunder 6.12 (48) | def. by | Perth 10.17 (77) | Rushton Park (crowd: 1512) |
| Sat, 3 May 2:05 PM | South Fremantle 17.13 (115) | def. | Claremont 8.3 (51) | Fremantle Oval (crowd: 1395) |
| Sat, 3 May 4:05 PM | Subiaco 13.6 (84) | def. by | Swan Districts 19.13 (127) | Leederville Oval (crowd: 2037) |
| | Bye; West Perth |

=== Round 8 ===
| | Round 8 |
| Sat, 10 May 2:05 PM | East Perth 19.10 (124) | def. | Claremont 6.8 (44) | Leederville Oval (crowd: 1517) |
| Sat, 10 May 2:05 PM | Perth 11.8 (74) | def. by | Subiaco 16.12 (108) | Lathlain Park (crowd: 1340) |
| Sat, 10 May 2:05 PM | Swan Districts 20.15 (135) | def. | East Fremantle 10.15 (75) | Bassendean Oval (crowd: 1911) |
| Sun, 11 May 2:05 PM | West Perth 14.9 (93) | def. | Peel Thunder 14.8 (92) | Arena Joondalup (crowd: 1256) |
| | Bye; South Fremantle |

=== Round 9 ===
| | Round 9 |
| Sat, 17 May 2:05 PM | Swan Districts 11.17 (83) | def. | Claremont 8.9 (57) | Bassendean Oval (crowd: 2471) |
| Sat, 17 May 2:05 PM | Peel Thunder 11.13 (79) | def. | South Fremantle 7.13 (55) | Rushton Park (crowd: 1461) |
| Sat, 17 May 2:05 PM | Perth 12.9 (81) | def. by | East Fremantle 13.12 (90) | Lathlain Park (crowd: 1595) |
| Sun, 17 May 2:05 PM | Subiaco 13.8 (86) | def. by | West Perth 14.12 (96) | Leederville Oval (crowd: 2508) |
| | Bye; East Perth |

=== Round 10 ===
| | Round 10 |
| Sat, 31 May 2:05 PM | Perth 13.8 (86) | def. by | Swan Districts 18.15 (123) | Lathlain Park (crowd: 2501) |
| Mon, 2 June 2:05 PM | Claremont 13.9 (87) | def. | Subiaco 10.18 (78) | Claremont Showground (crowd: 3312) |
| Mon, 2 June 2:05 PM | South Fremantle 13.13 (91) | def. by | East Fremantle 15.16 (106) | Fremantle Oval (crowd: 5566) |
| Mon, 2 June 2:05 PM | West Perth 7.11 (53) | def. by | East Perth 10.9 (69) | Arena Joondalup (crowd: 6201) |
| | Bye; Peel Thunder |

=== Round 11 ===
| | Round 11 |
| Sat, 7 June 2:05 PM | East Fremantle 15.10 (100) | def. | Peel Thunder 11.9 (75) | East Fremantle Oval (crowd: 1623) |
| Sat, 7 June 2:05 PM | Perth 9.6 (60) | def. by | East Perth 22.8 (140) | Lathlain Park (crowd: 2683) |
| Sat, 7 June 2:05 PM | Swan Districts 14.10 (94) | def. by | Subiaco 22.10 (142) | Bassendean Oval (crowd: 3596) |
| Sat, 7 June 2:05 PM | Claremont 9.11 (65) | def. by | West Perth 10.14 (74) | Claremont Showground (crowd: 1861) |
| | Bye; South Fremantle |

=== Round 12 ===
| | Round 12 |
| Sat, 14 June 2:05 PM | West Perth 12.8 (80) | def. by | East Fremantle 14.5 (89) | Arena Joondalup (crowd: 1514) |
| Sat, 14 June 2:05 PM | East Perth 21.17 (143) | def. | South Fremantle 12.10 (82) | Leederville Oval (crowd: 1715) |
| Sat, 14 June 2:05 PM | Peel Thunder 5.11 (41) | def. by | Swan Districts 11.16 (82) | Rushton Park (crowd: 1719) |
| Sat, 14 June 2:05 PM | Subiaco 14.19 (103) | def. | Perth 11.5 (71) | Kalgoorlie (crowd: 1770) |
| | Bye; Claremont |

=== Round 13 ===
| | Round 13 |
| Sat, 21 June 2:05 PM | Claremont 10.6 (66) | def. by | East Perth 12.10 (82) | Claremont Showground (crowd: 1251) |
| Sat, 21 June 2:05 PM | Peel Thunder 12.18 (90) | def. | Perth 10.11 (71) | Rushton Park (crowd: 2334) |
| Sat, 21 June 2:05 PM | South Fremantle 6.15 (51) | def. by | Swan Districts 9.2 (56) | Fremantle Oval (crowd: 1330) |
| Sat, 21 June 2:05 PM | Subiaco 8.14 (62) | def. by | East Fremantle 11.5 (71) | Leederville Oval (crowd: 1452) |
| | Bye; West Perth |

=== Round 14 ===
| | Round 14 |
| Sat, 28 June 2:05 PM | Subiaco 11.18 (84) | def. | Peel Thunder 7.16 (58) | Leederville Oval (crowd: 1300) |
| Sat, 28 June 2:05 PM | Swan Districts 11.5 (71) | def. by | Claremont 15.7 (97) | Bassendean Oval (crowd: 1636) |
| Sun, 29 June 2:05 PM | South Fremantle 10.11 (71) | def. by | West Perth 19.19 (133) | Fremantle Oval (crowd: 1515) |
| | Bye; East Fremantle, East Perth, Perth |

=== Round 15 ===
| | Round 15 |
| Sat, 5 July 2:05 PM | Claremont 12.13 (85) | def. | South Fremantle 9.9 (63) | Claremont Showground (crowd: 1560) |
| Sat, 5 July 2:05 PM | East Fremantle 14.18 (102) | def. | Perth 14.8 (92) | East Fremantle Oval (crowd: 1655) |
| Sat, 5 July 2:05 PM | East Perth 16.13 (109) | def. | Peel Thunder 6.10 (46) | Leederville Oval (crowd: 1751) |
| Sat, 5 July 2:05 PM | West Perth 11.10 (76) | def. by | Swan Districts 16.9 (105) | Arena Joondalup (crowd: 2319) |
| | Bye; Subiaco |

=== Round 16 ===
| | Round 16 |
| Sat, 12 July 2:05 PM | East Perth 14.20 (104) | def. | East Fremantle 11.10 (76) | Leederville Oval (crowd: 2523) |
| Sat, 12 July 2:05 PM | Perth 10.17 (77) | def. by | South Fremantle 13.11 (89) | Lathlain Park (crowd: 1730) |
| Sat, 12 July 2:05 PM | West Perth 11.6 (72) | def. by | Subiaco 13.19 (97) | Arena Joondalup (crowd: 5362) |
| Sat, 12 July 2:05 PM | Peel Thunder 11.8 (74) | def. | Claremont 9.18 (72) | Rushton Park (crowd: 1725) |
| | Bye; Swan Districts |

=== Round 17 ===
| | Round 17 |
| Sat, 19 July 2:05 PM | Claremont 14.13 (97) | def. | Swan Districts 14.10 (94) | Claremont Showground (crowd: 1784) |
| Sat, 19 July 2:05 PM | East Fremantle 14.14 (98) | def. | Peel Thunder 11.8 (74) | East Fremantle Oval (crowd: 1441) |
| Sat, 19 July 2:05 PM | Subiaco 27.9 (171) | def. | Perth 15.8 (98) | Leederville Oval (crowd: 1729) |
| | Bye; East Perth, South Fremantle, West Perth |

=== Round 18 ===
| | Round 18 |
| Sat, 26 July 2:05 PM | Claremont 7.10 (52) | def. | East Fremantle 4.11 (35) | Claremont Showground (crowd: 1551) |
| Sat, 26 July 2:05 PM | Swan Districts 11.11 (77) | def. | Perth 10.11 (71) | Bassendean Oval (crowd: 1433) |
| Sat, 26 July 2:05 PM | East Perth 5.9 (39) | def. | West Perth 2.6 (18) | Leederville Oval (crowd: 1493) |
| Sat, 26 July 2:05 PM | South Fremantle 12.12 (84) | def. by | Subiaco 13.15 (93) | Fremantle Oval (crowd: 1159) |
| | Bye; Peel Thunder |
West Perth’s score was its lowest for 95 years since it scored 1.5 (11), also against the Royals, at Perth Oval in the fourth round of 1919. The previous lower score by any WAFL club was 2.5 (17) by East Fremantle in the fourth round of 2006.

=== Round 19 ===
| | Round 19 |
| Sat, 2 August 2:05 PM | East Perth 10.9 (69) | def. by | Subiaco 15.7 (97) | Leederville Oval (crowd: 2010) |
| Sat, 2 August 2:05 PM | Perth 12.3 (75) | def. by | Peel Thunder 21.14 (140) | Lathlain Park (crowd: 1449) |
| Sat, 2 August 2:05 PM | East Fremantle 9.11 (65) | def. by | South Fremantle 16.12 (108) | East Fremantle Oval (crowd: 2224) |
| Sat, 2 August 2:05 PM | West Perth 14.9 (93) | def. | Swan Districts 5.7 (37) | Arena Joondalup (crowd: 1806) |
| | Bye; Claremont |

=== Round 20 ===
| | Round 20 |
| Sat, 9 August 2:05 PM | Claremont 17.8 (110) | def. | Perth 10.13 (73) | Claremont Showground (crowd: 1637) |
| Sat, 9 August 2:05 PM | South Fremantle 13.17 (95) | def. | Peel Thunder 14.10 (94) | Fremantle Oval (crowd: 1611) |
| Sat, 9 August 2:05 PM | Swan Districts 11.5 (71) | def. by | East Perth 14.22 (106) | Hands Oval, Bunbury (crowd: 3061) |
| Sat, 9 August 2:05 PM | West Perth 7.6 (48) | def. by | East Fremantle 9.11 (65) | Arena Joondalup (crowd: 1550) |
| | Bye; Subiaco |

=== Round 21 ===
| | Round 21 |
| Sat, 16 August 2:05 PM | Peel Thunder 8.11 (59) | def. by | West Perth 9.14 (68) | Rushton Park (crowd: 1351) |
| Sat, 16 August 2:05 PM | Perth 14.6 (90) | def. by | East Perth 28.14 (182) | Lathlain Park (crowd: 1517) |
| Sat, 16 August 2:05 PM | Subiaco 9.15 (69) | def. by | Claremont 11.11 (77) | Leederville Oval (crowd: 1893) |
| Sat, 16 August 2:05 PM | Swan Districts 9.15 (69) | def. by | South Fremantle 18.7 (115) | Bassendean Oval (crowd: 2087) |
| | Bye; East Fremantle |

=== Round 22 ===
| | Round 22 |
| Fri, 22 August 7:00 PM | South Fremantle 15.9 (99) | def. | Subiaco 12.13 (85) | Fremantle Oval (crowd: 1391) |
| Sat, 23 August 2:05 PM | Claremont 8.6 (54) | def. | West Perth 6.12 (48) | Claremont Showground (crowd: 1735) |
| Sat, 23 August 2:05 PM | East Fremantle 18.14 (122) | def. | Swan Districts 9.6 (60) | East Fremantle Oval (crowd: 2015) |
| Sat, 23 August 2:05 PM | Peel Thunder 5.9 (39) | def. by | East Perth 14.21 (105) | Rushton Park (crowd: 1378) |
| | Bye; Perth |

=== Round 23 ===
| | Round 23 |
| Sat, 30 August 2:05 PM | South Fremantle 14.20 (104) | def. | Peel Thunder 10.14 (74) | Fremantle Oval (crowd: 1142) |
| Sat, 30 August 2:05 PM | East Perth 11.11 (77) | def. by | Claremont 12.12 (84) | Leederville Oval (crowd: 1830) |
| Sat, 30 August 2:05 PM | Perth 9.8 (62) | def. by | West Perth 21.18 (144) | Lathlain Park (crowd: 1641) |
| Sun, 31 August 2:05 PM | Subiaco 12.9 (81) | def. | East Fremantle 8.8 (56) | Leederville Oval (crowd: 1750) |
| | Bye; Swan Districts |

== Ladder ==
2014 ladder
| Pos | Team | Pld | W | L | D | PF | PA | PP | Pts |
|---|---|---|---|---|---|---|---|---|---|
| 1 | East Perth | 20 | 16 | 4 | 0 | 1973 | 1430 | 138.0 | 64 |
| 2 | Subiaco (P) | 20 | 14 | 6 | 0 | 2000 | 1578 | 126.7 | 56 |
| 3 | East Fremantle | 20 | 12 | 8 | 0 | 1629 | 1609 | 101.2 | 48 |
| 4 | Swan Districts | 20 | 12 | 8 | 0 | 1750 | 1741 | 100.5 | 48 |
| 5 | Claremont | 20 | 11 | 9 | 0 | 1441 | 1683 | 85.6 | 44 |
| 6 | West Perth | 20 | 9 | 11 | 0 | 1619 | 1440 | 112.4 | 36 |
| 7 | South Fremantle | 20 | 9 | 11 | 0 | 1728 | 1807 | 95.6 | 36 |
| 8 | Peel Thunder | 20 | 4 | 16 | 0 | 1456 | 1778 | 81.9 | 16 |
| 9 | Perth | 20 | 3 | 17 | 0 | 1657 | 2187 | 75.8 | 12 |

Source: WAFL Footy Facts
Rules for classification: 1) points; 2) percentage; 3) number of points for.
(P) Premiers

== Finals series ==
=== Semi-finals ===
| | First semi-final |
| Sunday 7 September (2:15 pm) | East Fremantle 19.7 (121) | def. | Swan Districts 14.14 (98) | East Fremantle Oval (crowd: 2,670) | Report |

| | Second semi-final |
| Sunday 7 September (2:15 pm) | East Perth 13.12 (90) | def. | Subiaco 7.16 (58) | Leederville Oval (crowd: 2,770) | Report |

=== Preliminary final ===
| | Preliminary final |
| Sunday 14 September (2:15 pm) | Subiaco 10.13 (73) | def. | East Fremantle 7.26 (68) | Leederville Oval (crowd: 3,608) | Report |

=== Grand Final ===
2014 WAFL Grand Final
Sunday 21 September (2:15 pm) | East Perth | def. by | Subiaco | Patersons Stadium (crowd: 11,987) | Report
2.2 (14); 4.5 (29); 6.8 (44); 9.12 (66) | Q1; Q2; Q3; Final | 1.7 (13); 4.9 (33); 10.12 (72); 11.16 (82) | Umpires: Stuart Parry, Scott McPhee, Matthew Adams; Simpson Medal: Jason Bristow (Subiaco); Television broadcast: ABC
F. McInness 3, J. Smith 2, D. Cadwallader, F. Clutterbuck, P. McGinnity, S. Butler | Goals | G. Hampson 3, C. Deluca 2, C. Phelan 2, J. Bristow, R. Waters, K. Horsley, J. Deluca
B. Lee, B. Wilson, K. Anderson, D. Cadwallader, S. Butler, J. Brennan | Best | J. Bristow, C. Phelan, K. Horsley, G. Hampson, D. Leishman, W. Twomey
The attendance of 11,987 was the lowest WAFL Grand Final crowd since 1944

== Foxtel Cup ==
The two 2013 Grand Finalists West Perth and East Perth were invited to compete in the Foxtel Cup knockout competition in 2014. Their performances are shown below:

=== Round 1 ===
| Game #2 6 May 2014; 20:35 EST | Box Hill (Victoria (state)) | 51 - 53 stand alone game | (Western Australia) West Perth | Etihad Stadium match report match statistics |
| | 0.4 (4); 1.6 (12); 5.7 (37); 7.9 (51) | match report | 2.0 (12); 4.7 (31); 5.9 (39); 7.11 (53) |
| | | Goals |
| | Sicily 3, Ross 3, Willsmore | | Black, Brown, Adams, Tsalikis, Kerr, Bartholomew, Johnson |
| | | Bests |
| | Woodward, Kennedy, Ross, Isles, Sicily, Mirra | | Nelson, Jones, Manning, Crisp, Guadagnin, Morrow |

| Game #4 27 May 2014; 18:35 WST | East Perth (Western Australia) | 65 - 15 stand alone game | (South Australia) Norwood | Patersons Stadium match report match statistics |
| | 2.4 (16); 6.6 (42); 8.8 (56); 9.11 (65) | match report | 0.1 (1); 0.2 (2); 1.3 (9); 2.3 (15) |
| | | Goals |
| | S.Tunbridge 2, S.Lycett, B.Lee, W.Maginness, D.Main, J. Smith, B.Colledge, J.Oakley-Nicholls | | S.Phillips, M.Bower |
| | | Bests |
| | S.Lycett, S.Tunbridge, B.Colledge, F.Clutterbuck, B.Lee, S.Payne | | T.DeMatteis, K.Murphy, D.Auciello, S.Baldasso, T.Forster |

=== Semi-finals ===
| Semi Final #1 24 June 2014; 18:35 WST | Western Storm (Tasmania) | 23 - 97 stand alone game | (Western Australia) West Perth | Patersons Stadium match report match statistics |
| | 0.2 (2); 0.3 (3); 1.5 (11); 3.5 (23) | match report | 3.3 (21); 7.5 (47); 11.6 (72); 15.7 (97) |
| | | Goals |
| | A.Russell, W.Hanson, L.Barker | | M.McPhee 3, S.Martin 3, M.Johnson 2 M.Guadagnin, K.Shannon, M.Crisp, B.Antonio, R.Bartholomew, T.Manzone, S.Marusic |
| | | Bests |
| | J.Blackberry, M.Hanson, B.Thorp, T.Bardenhagen, J.Child | | A.Lynch, J.Thrum, L.Meadows, S.Martin, B.Antonio, S.Marusic |

| Semi Final #2 1 July 2014; 20:35 EST | Williamstown (Victoria (state)) | 71 - 47 stand alone game | (Western Australia) East Perth | Patersons Stadium, Perth match report match statistics |
| | 1.3 (9); 4.4 (28); 7.5 (47); 10.11 (71) | match report | 2.1 (13); 4.2 (26); 6.3 (39); 7.5 (47) |
| | | Goals |
| | J.Owen 2, S.Hetherington, A.Anastasio, J.Johnstone, J.Dorgan, S.Critchley, A.Woods, S.Wyatt, K.Lambert | | J.Hill 3, A.Carter, F.McInness, B.Colledge, B.Lee |
| | | Bests |
| | K.Lambert, J.Johnstone, M.Gibbons, J.Owen, S.Tighe, S.Critchley, A.Mangan | | S.Payne, P.Johnson, Colledge, B.Lee, J.Hill, J.Oakley-Nicholls |

=== Grand Final ===
| Grand Final 22 July 2014; 20:35 EST | West Perth (Western Australia) | 8 - 71 stand alone game | (Victoria (state)) Williamstown | Simonds Stadium, Geelong match report match statistics |
| | 0.2 (2); 0.2 (2); 0.2 (2); 1.2 (8) | match report | 5.4 (34); 5.9 (39); 7.11 (53); 10.11 (71) |
| | | Goals |
| | C.Chalmers | | C.Nastasi 2, S.Clouston 2, J.Johnstone 2, J.Owen, J.Dorgan, K.Lambert, S.Tighe |
| | | Bests |
| | A.Strijk, R.Kerr, L.Tedesco | | B.Davies, K.Lambert, S.Tighe, N.Sing, D.Fahey, J.McKenzie, S.Clouston |

== State game ==
The WAFL representative team competed against the North East Australian Football League (NEAFL) representative team on May 24 in Sydney.

| | 2014 State Game |
| Saturday 24 May (12:00 pm) | NEAFL 6.11 (47) | def. by | WAFL 19.18 (132) | Blacktown ISP Oval, Sydney (crowd: 500) | Report |
Simpson Medal (WAFL): Ashton Hams

== Awards ==
- The Sandover Medal (awarded to the fairest and best player of the home and away season) was won by Aaron Black (West Perth), who polled 47 votes, only 1 vote ahead of Luke Blackwell (Claremont) and Shane Nelson (West Perth).
- The Bernie Naylor Medal (for the leading goalkicker in the home and away season) was won by Ben Saunders (South Fremantle), who kicked 59 goals in 20 home and away matches.
- Brian Dawson (East Perth) received the JJ Leonard Medal as the Coach of the Year after guiding the Royals to a second straight grand final, and his fourth in five seasons as a league coach.
- The Subiaco Football Club were awarded the Rodriguez Shield, as the team with the best combined record at league, reserves and senior colts level in the 2014 season.
- The Reserves premiership was won by West Perth. They defeated Subiaco on a score of 5.9 (39) def. 3.7 (25).
- The Colts premiership was won by Swan Districts. They defeated Claremont on a score of 11.9 (75) def. 7.13 (55).
