= 2003 WAFL season =

Australian rules football season

- Teams: 9
- Premiers: West Perth; 18th premiership
- Minor premiers: Subiaco; 8th minor premiership
- Sandover Medallist: Shane Beros (Swan Districts)
- Bernie Naylor Medallist: Brad Smith (Subiaco)
- Matches played: 94

The 2003 WAFL season was the 119th season of the various incarnations of the West Australian Football League. For this season the WAFL reverted briefly to playing its semi-finals as a "double-header", a policy abandoned for good at the end of the 2005 season, and also reverted to a twenty-game home-and-away season with three byes which continued until after the 2017 season.

On the field, 2003 saw the end of East Perth's hat-trick of premierships as longtime rivals West Perth avenged their thrashing in the previous season's Grand Final, in the process becoming the first WAFL team to hold an opponent goalless since soon-defunct Midland Junction held West Perth themselves goalless in the opening round of 1916. Their Grand Final victims, Subiaco, were however to use this season as a springboard to the longest dynasty in the WA(N)FL since South Fremantle's famous teams of the late 1940s and early 1950s, with four consecutive minor premierships and four flags between 2004 and 2008. East Perth dominated the first two thirds of the season with the Falcons but after their goalless score they suffered major problems off the field and fell to third.

On the debit side, Peel Thunder, after three relatively promising seasons and the granting of a new five-year licence during April to secure their status in the WAFL, returned to rock bottom, losing their first seventeen matches and looking certain of a second winless season before an upset victory at Fremantle Oval against a South Fremantle team expected to break into a seemingly settled top four. They were not helped by the loss via transfer to East Fremantle after six games of their only competent forward in Scott Simister. The Sharks, historically the league's most successful club, sunk to a level not seen during the twentieth century owing to the loss due to injury and transfer of their regular ruck division, which left them critically short of height after David Dwyer fell injured in the fifth round. The blue and whites lead Peel by only one match for most of the year, and despite winning five of their last seven matches, East Fremantle were to win a mere nineteen of eighty matches between 2003 and 2006, the worst four consecutive seasons in their history. (Note: A record of 23 wins and 61 losses between 1967 and 1970 is the only approach.)

== Home-and-away season ==
=== Round 1 ===
	Round 1
Saturday, 22 March (2:15 pm)	Claremont 16.9 (105)	def.	Peel Thunder 7.12 (54)	Claremont Oval (crowd: 1427)
Saturday, 22 March (2:15 pm)	Swan Districts 15.15 (105)	drew with	East Perth 17.3 (105)	Busselton (crowd: 1473)
	Bye; East Fremantle, Perth, South Fremantle, Subiaco, West Perth
2002 wooden spooners Swan Districts record a controversial draw against the three-time premiers after rover Shane Beros kicked a behind which East Perth claimed was touched after the siren to preclude a score – this was ultimately denied. It proved the last draw in the WAFL for 500 matches until Round 9, 2008.

=== Round 2 ===
	Round 2
Friday, 28 March (6:45 pm)	Subiaco 17.7 (109)	def.	Claremont 5.12 (42)	Subiaco Oval (crowd: 1541)
Friday, 28 March (6:45 pm)	South Fremantle 17.11 (113)	def.	East Fremantle 14.7 (91)	Fremantle Oval (crowd: 3496)
Saturday, 29 March (2:15 pm)	West Perth 12.3 (75)	def. by	East Perth 16.11 (107)	Arena Joondalup (crowd: 1779)
Sunday, 30 March (2:15 pm)	Swan Districts 14.7 (91)	def.	Perth 7.10 (52)	Bassendean Oval (crowd: 1600)
	Bye; Peel Thunder
East Perth win well but are upset at the condition of Arena Joondalup, which caused the Royals two major knee injuries.

=== Round 3 ===
	Round 3
Saturday, 5 April (2:15 pm)	East Fremantle 12.10 (82)	def. by	Subiaco 13.11 (89)	East Fremantle Oval (crowd: 1427)
Saturday, 5 April (2:15 pm)	Claremont 10.10 (70)	def. by	West Perth 21.16 (142)	Claremont Oval (crowd: 1389)
Saturday, 5 April (2:15 pm)	Perth 7.10 (52)	def. by	South Fremantle 17.12 (114)	Lathlain Park (crowd: 1465)
Saturday, 5 April (2:15 pm)	Peel Thunder 9.4 (58)	def. by	Swan Districts 20.20 (140)	Rushton Park (crowd: 1375)
	Bye; East Perth
Skipper Joel Cornelius is wary of Swan Districts' flying start after winning only one game in 2002, despite the team kicking 19.20 (134) to 5.4 (34) after quarter-time in a result that fails to vindicate Peel's new five-year licence.

=== Round 4 ===
	Round 4
Saturday, 12 April (2:15 pm)	West Perth 13.13 (91)	def.	East Fremantle 10.12 (72)	Arena Joondalup (crowd: 1072)
Saturday, 12 April (2:15 pm)	South Fremantle 17.12 (114)	def.	Peel Thunder 12.10 (82)	Fremantle Oval (crowd: 852)
Sunday, 13 April (2:15 pm)	Claremont 4.8 (32)	def. by	East Perth 18.14 (122)	Claremont Oval (crowd: 1840)
Sunday, 13 April (2:15 pm)	Subiaco 15.10 (100)	def.	Perth 8.14 (62)	Subiaco Oval (crowd: 1399)
	Bye; Swan Districts
Troy Wilson's intimidating presence crushes Claremont, who were ineffective in over a third of their 247 disposals.; Peel led by six points at half-time but rookie Thunder coach John Ditchburn becomes angry at their fade-out in the second half after two Bulldog 50-metre penalties result in goals.

=== Round 5 (Easter weekend) ===
	Round 5
Saturday, 19 April (2:15 pm)	East Perth 19.12 (126)	def.	East Fremantle 12.7 (79)	Subiaco Oval (crowd: 1390)
Saturday, 19 April (2:15 pm)	Swan Districts 14.9 (93)	def. by	South Fremantle 14.17 (101)	Bassendean Oval (crowd: 2708)
Saturday, 19 April (2:15 pm)	Peel Thunder 9.11 (65)	def. by	Subiaco 18.27 (135)	Rushton Park (crowd: 1516)
Monday, 21 April (2:15 pm)	Perth 15.5 (95)	def. by	West Perth 18.13 (121)	Lathlain Park (crowd: 2164)
	Bye; Claremont
Despite the loss of coach John Northey due to a health scare from his wife, South Fremantle stay undefeated against a persistent Swans team that never has the class to overpower the Bulldogs.

=== Round 6 ===
	Round 6
Friday, 25 April (2:15 pm)	Swan Districts 8.10 (58)	def. by	Subiaco 12.13 (85)	Bassendean Oval (crowd: 3317)
Saturday, 26 April (2:15 pm)	Perth 11.13 (79)	def. by	East Perth 19.11 (125)	Lathlain Park (crowd: 1922)
Saturday, 26 April (2:15 pm)	Peel Thunder 9.9 (63)	def. by	West Perth 14.22 (106)	Rushton Park (crowd: 1405)
Saturday, 26 April (2:15 pm)	East Fremantle 9.9 (63)	def. by	Claremont 14.21 (105)	East Fremantle Oval (crowd: 1328)
	Bye; South Fremantle
West Coast draft pick Adam Selwood shows he justified the Eagles' choice via a fine display against the winless Demons after a recurring calf injury limited him to five matches during 2002.; Former Shark Brad Dodd, despite being nervous playing against his old team, revives a decrepit Tiger midfield to keep the Sharks winless.

=== Round 7 ===
	Round 7
Saturday, 3 May (2:15 pm)	East Perth 27.16 (178)	def.	Peel Thunder 12.6 (78)	Leederville Oval (crowd: 1491)
Saturday, 3 May (2:15 pm)	West Perth 16.12 (108)	def.	Swan Districts 10.12 (72)	Arena Joondalup (crowd: 1892)
Saturday, 3 May (2:15 pm)	Subiaco 19.18 (132)	def.	South Fremantle 10.7 (67)	Subiaco Oval (crowd: 1449)
Saturday, 3 May (2:15 pm)	Claremont 11.9 (75)	def.	Perth 9.17 (71)	Claremont Oval (crowd: 1216)
	Bye; East Fremantle
Despite severe stomach cramps, Subiaco's Anthony Beattie produces a devastating display on the half-forward flank and gives a stern warning to the other eight WAFL clubs against the previously unbeaten Bulldogs.; Claremont get out of jail against the still-winless Demons after playing extremely poorly for three quarters through failing to follow basic instructions by coach Guy McKenna.

=== Round 8 ===
	Round 8
Saturday, 10 May (2:15 pm)	Perth 18.16 (124)	def.	East Fremantle 9.10 (64)	Lathlain Park (crowd: 1483)
Saturday, 10 May (2:15 pm)	South Fremantle 11.18 (84)	def. by	West Perth 21.13 (139)	Fremantle Oval (crowd: 1557)
Saturday, 10 May (2:15 pm)	Peel Thunder 8.7 (55)	def. by	Claremont 13.16 (94)	Rushton Park (crowd: 1130)
Sunday, 11 May (2:15 pm)	Swan Districts 12.9 (81)	def. by	East Perth 25.9 (159)	Bassendean Oval (crowd: 2410)
	Bye; Subiaco
Led by West Coast recruit and late inclusion Jeremy Humm, East Perth take revenge for their controversial opening round draw by crushing the Swans, in the process scoring 11.3 (69) in the last quarter.

=== Round 9 ===
	Round 9
Saturday, 17 May (2:15 pm)	West Perth 12.8 (80)	def.	Subiaco 8.11 (59)	Arena Joondalup (crowd: 1720)
Saturday, 17 May (2:15 pm)	Claremont 8.7 (55)	def. by	Swan Districts 10.12 (72)	Claremont Oval (crowd: 1058)
Saturday, 17 May (2:15 pm)	East Fremantle 16.13 (109)	def.	Peel Thunder 12.5 (77)	East Fremantle Oval (crowd: 1035)
Saturday, 17 May (2:15 pm)	East Perth 13.12 (90)	def.	South Fremantle 12.9 (81)	Leederville Oval (crowd: 1730)
	Bye; Perth
A controversial goal by West Perth's Travis McLean (believed to have been kicked after the three-quarter-time siren) drives the Falcons to their seventh consecutive victory in their last match before the Foundation day derby with undefeated East Perth.; Swan Districts rebound with a fighting win over Claremont, who score only 1.4 (10) after half-time but lead throughout until a five-goal burst, led by former Kangaroos player Adam Lange, from halfway through the final quarter.

=== Round 10 ===
	Round 10
Saturday, 24 May (2:15 pm)	Swan Districts 16.11 (107)	def.	East Fremantle 15.9 (99)	Bassendean Oval (crowd: 1717)
Saturday, 24 May (2:15 pm)	Peel Thunder 6.11 (47)	def. by	Perth 13.17 (95)	Rushton Park (crowd: 1172)
Saturday, 24 May (2:15 pm)	South Fremantle 8.8 (56)	def. by	Claremont 18.8 (116)	Fremantle Oval (crowd: 1161)
Sunday, 25 May (2:15 pm)	Subiaco 14.3 (87)	def. by	East Perth 17.14 (116)	Subiaco Oval (crowd: 2347)
	Bye; West Perth
East Perth's tough defence keeps Subiaco to 1.0 (6) after the early minutes of the third quarter. The results wins the Royals the "Prestige Loans Cup" as the best-performed club of the first full round. (Note: This "first full round" consisted of Rounds 2 to 10, during which the nine WAFL clubs played each other once.); With Darren Glass permanently playing in the AFL, Stan Magro moves half-back Simon Rudd to full-back and he decimates the Peel forward line, in the process moving the Demons two games clear off the bottom.

=== Round 11 (Foundation Day) ===
	Round 11
Friday, 30 May (2:15 pm)	Perth 10.5 (65)	def. by	Swan Districts 23.16 (154)	Lathlain Park (crowd: 1898)
Monday, 2 June (2:15 pm)	Claremont 17.11 (113)	def.	Subiaco 12.4 (76)	Claremont Oval (crowd: 1728)
Monday, 2 June (2:15 pm)	East Perth 12.6 (78)	def. by	West Perth 13.13 (91)	Leederville Oval (crowd: 4891)
Monday, 2 June (2:15 pm)	East Fremantle 13.8 (86)	def. by	South Fremantle 13.9 (87)	East Fremantle Oval (crowd: 4073)
	Bye; Peel Thunder
The loss of Richard Kelly with a serious wrist injury devastates Perth when five goals ahead early in the second quarter – the Demons score 3.3 (21) to 21.13 (139) during the remainder of the match.; Peel recruit Scott Simister nearly leads East Fremantle to a second victory but South, ahead all day, hang on in a scrappy finish.

=== Round 12 ===
	Round 12
Saturday, 7 June (2:15 pm)	Subiaco 22.15 (147)	def.	East Fremantle 8.5 (53)	Leederville Oval (crowd: 1221)
Saturday, 7 June (2:15 pm)	South Fremantle 15.17 (107)	def.	Perth 6.9 (45)	Fremantle Oval (crowd: 1040)
Saturday, 7 June (2:15 pm)	Swan Districts 27.12 (174)	def.	Peel Thunder 4.6 (30)	Bassendean Oval (crowd: 2079)
Saturday, 7 June (2:15 pm)	West Perth 22.6 (138)	def.	Claremont 11.10 (76)	Arena Joondalup (crowd: 2013)
	Bye; East Perth
Chris Maguire kicks five of Perth's six goals, but with Jacob Surjan moving into the middle after kicking three goals, Perth have no chance of improving a record of only five wins at Fremantle Oval since 1979.; Peel's score, in what was to become a sequence as embarrassing as any in 1997 or 1999, was the lowest by any visiting team at Bassendean Oval, beating Subiaco's 5.8 (38) from 1983. Swans kicked 23.9 (147) to 2.3 (15) after quarter-time.

=== Round 13 ===
	Round 13
Saturday, 14 June (2:15 pm)	Perth 8.9 (57)	def. by	Subiaco 19.14 (128)	Lathlain Park (crowd: 1440)
Saturday, 14 June (2:15 pm)	West Perth 16.16 (112)	def.	East Fremantle 8.14 (62)	Geraldton (crowd: 1753)
Saturday, 14 June (2:15 pm)	East Perth 8.8 (56)	def. by	Claremont 8.12 (60)	Leederville Oval (crowd: 2252)
Saturday, 14 June (2:15 pm)	Peel Thunder 10.11 (71)	def. by	South Fremantle 14.15 (99)	Rushton Park (crowd: 1143)
	Bye; Swan Districts
Seven-goal Brendon Fewster dominates as West Perth with their tenth consecutive match and move six points clear at the top.; A WAFL bye hoodoo affects East Perth as Anthony Jones, despite scoring only 0.3 (3), wins the match with his marking and gathering in attack.; A grimly determined Peel, whose lack of fitness and finesse costs it a first win for 2003, are held off by 258-games Marty Atkins the very match before he breaks Tom Grljusich's club games record.

=== Round 14 ===
	Round 14
Saturday, 28 June (2:15 pm)	East Fremantle 11.7 (73)	def. by	East Perth 12.7 (79)	East Fremantle Oval (crowd: 1217)
Saturday, 28 June (2:15 pm)	Subiaco 18.11 (119)	def.	Peel Thunder 4.10 (34)	Subiaco Oval (crowd: 1107)
Saturday, 28 June (2:15 pm)	South Fremantle 12.13 (85)	def.	Swan Districts 13.14 (92)	Fremantle Oval (crowd: 1111)
Saturday, 28 June (2:15 pm)	West Perth 8.12 (60)	def. by	Perth 12.10 (82)	Arena Joondalup (crowd: 1124)
	Bye; Claremont
Stan Magro's ruggedness rubs off on struggling Perth as they end West Perth's ten-match winning streak kicking 7.3 (45) to 0.5 (5) on a waterlogged ground, with top goalkickers McLean and Fewster scoring only one between them.; East Perth hold out lowly East Fremantle as Jeremy Barnard kicks five goals in tough conditions for the Sharks fifth loss by under two goals during 2003.

=== Round 15 ===
	Round 15
Saturday, 5 July (2:15 pm)	Claremont 16.13 (109)	def.	East Fremantle 6.9 (45)	Claremont Oval (crowd: 1024)
Saturday, 5 July (2:15 pm)	Swan Districts 3.22 (40)	def. by	Subiaco 9.9 (63)	Kalgoorlie (crowd: 1803)
Saturday, 5 July (2:15 pm)	West Perth 25.16 (166)	def.	Peel Thunder 8.14 (62)	Arena Joondalup (crowd: 1062)
Sunday, 6 July (2:15 pm)	East Perth 12.10 (82)	def. by	Perth 17.6 (108)	Leederville Oval (crowd: 1762)
	Bye; South Fremantle
On a windy and showery day in Kalgoorlie, Swan Districts kick the most inaccurate league score since East Perth kicked 3.30 (48) – ironically against the Swans – in 1957. Brad Smith score four goals after half-time.; A second successive upset victory in heavy conditions by Perth spoils Barnard's two hundredth match. Chris Maguire kicks six goals as Perth take full advantage of only 42 inside 50s for the whole game.

=== Round 16 ===
	Round 16
Saturday, 12 July (2:15 pm)	South Fremantle 9.12 (66)	def. by	Subiaco 14.9 (93)	Fremantle Oval (crowd: 1315)
Saturday, 12 July (2:15 pm)	Peel Thunder 3.4 (22)	def. by	East Perth 22.20 (152)	Rushton Park (crowd: 1216)
Saturday, 12 July (2:15 pm)	Perth 11.15 (81)	def. by	Claremont 13.10 (88)	Lathlain Park (crowd: 1743)
Saturday, 12 July (2:15 pm)	Swan Districts 5.7 (37)	def. by	West Perth 23.16 (154)	Bassendean Oval (crowd: 2349)
	Bye; East Fremantle
West Perth spoil Joel Cornelius' one hundred and fiftieth consecutive WAFL match with a crushing win over a depleted Swan team as Mark Seaby and the Falcon centreline again become unstoppable.; Peel kick the lowest score against the Royals since Swan Districts kicked 2.8 (20) in 1968. It is the lowest score ever in a WAFL game at Rushton Park.; Adam Selwood crushes Peel's one dangerous player in 32-year-old Derek Hall as Peel go inside 50 only 14 times during a crushing defeat.

=== Round 17 ===
	Round 17
Saturday, 19 July (2:15 pm)	East Fremantle 22.12 (144)	def.	Perth 10.6 (66)	East Fremantle Oval (crowd: 1393)
Saturday, 19 July (2:15 pm)	East Perth 20.15 (135)	def.	Swan Districts 8.10 (58)	Leederville Oval (crowd: 2158)
Saturday, 19 July (2:15 pm)	Claremont 30.17 (197)	def.	Peel Thunder 3.2 (20)	Claremont Oval (crowd: 1385)
Saturday, 19 July (2:15 pm)	West Perth 18.15 (123)	def.	South Fremantle 8.17 (65)	Arena Joondalup (crowd: 2262)
	Bye; Subiaco
Claremont's crushing win, achieved despite losing midfielder Jaxon Crabb for the season to a knee reconstruction, set numerous records: 1. Peel's score in the lowest ever conceded by Claremont, beating Swan Districts' 3.3 (21) from 1964.; 2. Peel become only the second side since the 1924 final and Grand Final to score three goals or fewer in consecutive matches, after West Perth in 1996.; 3. The Thunder become only the third team in open-age WAFL competition to lose three successive matches by over 100 points, repeating their own ignominy from 1997.; 4. Claremont's 109-point half-time margin was the highest in open-age league football to that point, beating 104 points by South Fremantle against West Perth from 1981.

=== Round 18 ===
	Round 18
Saturday, 26 July (2:15 pm)	South Fremantle 14.8 (92)	def. by	East Perth 14.11 (95)	Fremantle Oval (crowd: 1608)
Saturday, 26 July (2:15 pm)	Subiaco 12.10 (82)	def.	West Perth 5.14 (44)	Subiaco Oval (crowd: 1873)
Saturday, 26 July (2:15 pm)	Swan Districts 12.9 (81)	def. by	Claremont 14.11 (95)	Bassendean Oval (crowd: 2179)
Saturday, 26 July (2:15 pm)	Peel Thunder 6.7 (43)	def. by	East Fremantle 20.22 (142)	Rushton Park (crowd: 1194)
	Bye; Perth
East Perth spoil South Fremantle veteran Tom Bottrell's last appearance despite a committed final stanza challenge that culminates in a ferocious last fifteen minutes where only 0.4 (4) is scored between the two teams.; 1996 colts premiership star Sam Griffiths plays his fiftieth league game after a succession of knee injuries and kicks three goals in his new role as a forward – in the process snuffing out the persistent Swans.; After a promising start, Peel are overwhelmed in a game where coach John Ditchburn had set them for a "big" performance, as their established players fail completely. East Fremantle win each of the first three quarters by an even sixteen points, but overwhelm the Thunder in the last.

=== Round 19 ===
	Round 19
Saturday, 2 August (2:15 pm)	Perth 19.13 (127)	def.	Peel Thunder 4.12 (36)	Lathlain Park (crowd: 1155)
Saturday, 2 August (2:15 pm)	East Fremantle 14.13 (97)	def.	Swan Districts 11.10 (76)	East Fremantle Oval (crowd: 1144)
Sunday, 3 August (2:15 pm)	Claremont 9.10 (64)	def. by	South Fremantle 13.12 (90)	Claremont Oval (crowd: 1265)
Sunday, 3 August (2:15 pm)	East Perth 15.15 (105)	def.	Subiaco 8.7 (55)	Leederville Oval (crowd: 2364)
	Bye; West Perth
Stan Magro's new playing style hurts returning Demon Richard Kelly more than his wrist or the Peel players – whose first goal comes from a 100-metre penalty eleven minutes into the third quarter.; A brilliant first quarter from Paul Ridley ensures East Perth a critical victory – but in the process they lose co-captain Wheatley and midfielder Cowell.; Seven straight goals in windy conditions from Zane Parsons leaves Claremont out of the running for the top two and causes critics to think the Tigers have no pretensions for the premiership.

=== Round 20 ===
	Round 20
Saturday, 9 August (2:15 pm)	Swan Districts 14.5 (89)	def.	Perth 12.7 (79)	Bassendean Oval (crowd: 1674)
Saturday, 9 August (2:15 pm)	Subiaco 12.7 (79)	def.	Claremont 10.4 (64)	Leederville Oval (crowd: 1478)
Saturday, 9 August (2:15 pm)	South Fremantle 15.18 (108)	def.	East Fremantle 10.10 (70)	Fremantle Oval (crowd: 2603)
Sunday, 10 August (2:15 pm)	West Perth 7.13 (55)	def.	East Perth 0.9 (9)	Arena Joondalup (crowd: 2051)
	Bye; Peel Thunder
The switch of Luke Toia to defence works wonders for Subiaco after being scoreless at quarter-time, as along with Mark Nicoski, his dashes break up the crowded play.; On a rainswept Arena Joondalup, East Perth, against all advice kicking into the breeze after winning the toss, set several unwanted records: 1. The Royals became the first WAFL/WANFL/WASFL/Westar Rules team to score no goals in a match since West Perth themselves kicked 0.10 (10) against Midland Junction in Round 1, 1916.; 2. Their score was the lowest in the league since Claremont kicked 1.3 (9) against Perth in Round 15, 1945; the previous lower was 1.2 (8) by Subiaco against East Perth in Round 13 of 1920.; 3. It was East Perth's lowest since they kicked 1.3 (9) against West Perth in 1913; their sole lower tally being 0.6 (6) against East Fremantle in 1909.

=== Round 21 ===
	Round 21
Saturday, 16 August (2:15 pm)	Claremont 9.9 (63)	def. by	West Perth 14.13 (97)	Claremont Oval (crowd: 1686)
Saturday, 16 August (2:15 pm)	Perth 11.14 (80)	def. by	South Fremantle 15.12 (102)	Lathlain Park (crowd: 1261)
Saturday, 16 August (2:15 pm)	East Fremantle 8.11 (59)	def. by	Subiaco 14.16 (100)	East Fremantle Oval (crowd: 1187)
Saturday, 16 August (2:15 pm)	Peel Thunder 9.8 (62)	def. by	Swan Districts 28.22 (190)	Rushton Park (crowd: 1005)
	Bye; East Perth
In hot, sunny weather, West Perth continue their form in the rain at Joondalup the previous Sunday to firm as flag favourites and leave South Fremantle, playing the winless Thunder, with a golden opportunity to displace Claremont from a top four that had looked settled for many weeks.

=== Round 22 ===
	Round 22
Saturday, 23 August (2:15 pm)	West Perth 10.12 (72)	def. by	East Fremantle 17.9 (111)	Arena Joondalup (crowd: 1537)
Saturday, 23 August (2:15 pm)	East Perth 10.5 (65)	def. by	Claremont 10.10 (70)	Leederville Oval (crowd: 1790)
Saturday, 23 August (2:15 pm)	Subiaco 14.14 (98)	def.	Perth 9.5 (59)	Subiaco Oval (crowd: 1399)
Saturday, 23 August (2:15 pm)	South Fremantle 11.14 (80)	def. by	Peel Thunder 14.14 (98)	Fremantle Oval (crowd: 1134)
	Bye; Swan Districts
Claremont confirm their finals berth with a thrilling win over a depleted East Perth, who almost made amends for their goalless Joondalup debacle when Troy Wilson was denied a mark in front almost on the siren.; Four quick goals early in the final quarter provide previously winless Peel with the upset of the season against a South Fremantle side without key forward Zane Parsons. The Thunder were so ecstatic at avoiding a second winless season that they sang their song out on the playing arena.; East Fremantle, who had won only once in their first thirteen matches, completely outplay the premiership favourites in the second and third quarters. Midfielders Kris Miller and Craig Treleven have 40 and 33 possessions respectively and Scott Simister kicks seven goals.; The Perth game was Subiaco's last home game at Subiaco Oval before they moved to Leederville due to lower overheads.

=== Round 23 ===
	Round 23
Saturday, 30 August (2:15 pm)	Perth 10.7 (67)	def.	West Perth 8.9 (57)	Lathlain Park (crowd: 1589)
Saturday, 30 August (2:15 pm)	East Fremantle 12.9 (81)	def.	East Perth 8.11 (59)	East Fremantle Oval (crowd: 1564)
Saturday, 30 August (2:15 pm)	Peel Thunder 8.7 (55)	def. by	Subiaco 30.15 (195)	Rushton Park (crowd: 1294)
Saturday, 30 August (2:15 pm)	Swan Districts 12.13 (85)	def.	South Fremantle 8.14 (62)	Bassendean Oval (crowd: 2351)
	Bye; Claremont
Perth coach Magro confirms he will remain with the Demons for 2004 (Note: It was thought for a long time that Magro would replace the retiring Northey at his former club for the 2004 season.) as the Demons shrug aside West Perth in a low-scoring game during which the Perth defence comfortably holds off a last-quarter siege.; Subiaco, in wrapping up the first of four consecutive minor premierships, kicked the highest-ever score and biggest win at Rushton Park.

== Ladder ==
2003 WAFL ladder
Pos	Team	Pld	W	L	D	PF	PA	PP	Pts	
1	Subiaco	20	16	4	0	2031	1321	153.7	64	Finals
2	West Perth (P)	20	15	5	0	2031	1416	143.4	60	Finals
3	East Perth	20	13	6	1	2043	1462	139.7	54	Finals
4	Claremont	20	12	8	0	1693	1572	107.7	48	Finals
5	Swan Districts	20	10	9	1	1895	1749	108.3	42	
6	South Fremantle	20	10	10	0	1773	1797	98.7	40	
7	East Fremantle	20	6	14	0	1682	1890	89.0	24	
8	Perth	20	6	14	0	1546	1882	82.1	24	
9	Peel Thunder	20	1	19	0	1112	2717	40.9	4	

Rules for classification: 1) points; 2) percentage; 3) number of points for.
(P) Premiers

== Finals ==
=== Semi-finals ===
	First semi-final
Sunday, 7 September (2:15 pm)	East Perth 11.8 (74)	def.	Claremont 6.9 (45)	Subiaco Oval (crowd: 5,183)
East Perth send a timely reminder of their power to Subiaco and West Perth with their seventh straight finals win in wet conditions.

	Second semi-final
Sunday, 7 September (5:45 pm)	Subiaco 12.8 (80)	def.	West Perth 11.6 (72)	Subiaco Oval (crowd: 5,183)
Since the two semi-finals were played on the same day at the same venue, the attendance figure is the same.; Subiaco overcome a finals hoodoo against West Perth dating back to the 1973 Grand Final with two late goals in the rain from pint-sized Allistair Pickett.

=== Preliminary final ===
	Preliminary final
Sunday, 14 September (2:15 pm)	West Perth 16.22 (118)	def.	East Perth 9.8 (62)	Subiaco Oval (crowd: 7,755)
West Perth kick nine goals to nil in the second quarter to end East Perth's run of finals victories despite omitting 1999 Simpson Medallist Christian Kelly.

=== Grand Final ===
2003 WAFL Grand Final
Sunday, 21 September	Subiaco	def. by	West Perth	Subiaco Oval (crowd: 17,750)
2.2 (14); 4.7 (31); 5.8 (38); 9.10 (64)	Q1; Q2; Q3; Final	3.5 (23); 7.5 (47); 9.9 (63); 13.9 (87)	Umpires: Craig Hendrie, David Corcoran, Ryan Worthington; Simpson Medal: Brent LeCras (West Perth)
Sierakowski 2, Cossom, Godden, Toia, Wooden, Ryan, Pickett, Marshall	Goals	Longmuir 5, Logden 2, Lynch 2, McLean, Fewster, Rioli, Chambers
Wooden, Ambrose, Maloney, Cossom, Pickett, Sierakowski	Best	Koops, LeCras, Longmuir, Seaby, Logan, Todd Curley
Smith (knee), Webb (concussion)	Injuries
The loss of leading full-forward Brad Smith and a shock decision to kick into a strong wind ruin Subiaco's hopes of a first premiership since 1988.
