= 2009 WAFL season =

Australian rules football season

- Teams: 9
- Premiers: South Fremantle; 13th premiership
- Minor premiers: South Fremantle; 12th minor premiership
- Sandover Medallist: Ross Young (Perth)
- Bernie Naylor Medallist: Chad Jones (Claremont)
- Matches played: 94

The 2009 WAFL season was the 125th season of the West Australian Football League in its various incarnations. It saw South Fremantle break Subiaco’s dynasty that had seen the Lions a kick shy of a perfect season in 2008, winning their last ten games after the early part of the season was the most evenly contested since the nine-club competition began in 1997.

In the end, however, the top four was the same as in 2008. Peel Thunder, with Dean Buszan back, at one point looked like they might achieve their first season with more wins than losses, but returned to their old ways, losing their last ten games by an average of sixty-two points, whilst East Fremantle did not build upon their excellent finish to 2008. 2008 wooden spooners East Perth turned out the biggest threat to the top four with seven wins from eight matches but failed in their last match against Subiaco.

== Home-and-away season ==
=== Round 1 ===
	Round 1
Friday, 20 March (7:40 pm)	Subiaco 10.21 (81)	def.	Claremont 10.6 (66)	Leederville Oval (crowd: 2276)
Friday, 20 March (7:40 pm)	South Fremantle 15.14 (104)	def.	Swan Districts 13.9 (87)	Fremantle Oval (crowd: 3354)
Saturday, 21 March (2:15 pm)	East Fremantle 15.7 (97)	def.	Peel Thunder 14.5 (89)	East Fremantle Oval (crowd: 2011)
Saturday, 21 March (2:15 pm)	West Perth 16.7 (103)	def.	East Perth 14.12 (96)	Arena Joondalup (crowd: 2557)
	Bye; Perth

=== Round 2 ===
	Round 2
Friday, 27 March (6:30 pm)	East Perth 5.16 (46)	def. by	East Fremantle 13.15 (93)	Leederville Oval (crowd: 1508)
Saturday, 28 March (2:15 pm)	West Perth 17.12 (114)	def.	South Fremantle 16.11 (107)	Arena Joondalup (crowd: 1986)
Saturday, 28 March (2:15 pm)	Peel Thunder 16.13 (109)	def.	Perth 16.10 (106)	Rushton Park (crowd: 1569)
Saturday, 28 March (2:15 pm)	Swan Districts 14.17 (101)	def.	Subiaco 15.7 (97)	Bassendean Oval (crowd: 2406)
	Bye; Claremont

=== Round 3 ===
	Round 3
Friday, 3 April (7:40 pm)	South Fremantle 5.19 (49)	def. by	Perth 13.12 (90)	Fremantle Oval (crowd: 2881)
Friday, 3 April (7:40 pm)	Subiaco 20.9 (129)	def.	West Perth 13.10 (88)	Leederville Oval (crowd: 2576)
Saturday, 4 April (2:15 pm)	Claremont 10.14 (74)	def. by	East Perth 19.8 (122)	Claremont Oval (crowd: 1702)
Saturday, 4 April (2:15 pm)	Swan Districts 13.12 (90)	def. by	Peel Thunder 18.15 (123)	Bassendean Oval (crowd: 1935)
	Bye; East Fremantle

=== Round 4 (Easter weekend) ===
	Round 4
Thursday, 9 April (7:40 pm)	Subiaco 13.7 (85)	def. by	South Fremantle 21.14 (140)	Leederville Oval (crowd: 2533)
Saturday, 11 April (2:15 pm)	East Fremantle 13.20 (98)	def.	Claremont 12.13 (85)	East Fremantle Oval (crowd: 2058)
Monday, 13 April (2:15 pm)	Perth 11.8 (74)	def.	Swan Districts 9.13 (67)	Lathlain Park (crowd: 3921)
Monday, 13 April (2:15 pm)	East Perth 10.12 (72)	def. by	Peel Thunder 10.15 (75)	Leederville Oval (crowd: 2130)
	Bye; West Perth

=== Round 5 ===
	Round 5
Saturday, 18 April (2:15 pm)	Claremont 14.11 (95)	def. by	South Fremantle 16.16 (112)	Albany (crowd: 2394)
Saturday, 18 April (2:15 pm)	East Fremantle 18.7 (115)	def.	West Perth 13.12 (90)	East Fremantle Oval (crowd: 2396)
Saturday, 18 April (2:15 pm)	East Perth 14.8 (92)	def.	Perth 12.11 (83)	Leederville Oval (crowd: 2054)
Sunday, 19 April (3:15 pm)	Peel Thunder 16.9 (105)	def. by	Subiaco 17.11 (113)	Rushton Park (crowd: 1966)
	Bye; Swan Districts

=== Round 6 (Anzac Day weekend) ===
	Round 6
Saturday, 25 April (1:30 pm)	South Fremantle 11.14 (80)	def.	East Fremantle 11.8 (74)	Fremantle Oval (crowd: 5484)
Saturday, 25 April (2:15 pm)	Swan Districts 13.18 (96)	def.	Claremont 11.11 (77)	Bassendean Oval (crowd: 2334)
Sunday, 26 April (2:15 pm)	Perth 13.8 (86)	def. by	West Perth 15.15 (105)	Lathlain Park (crowd: 3651)
Monday, 27 April (2:15 pm)	Subiaco 10.13 (73)	def. by	East Perth 10.16 (76)	Leederville Oval (crowd: 3670)
	Bye; Peel Thunder

=== Round 7 ===
	Round 7
Friday, 1 May (7:45 pm)	West Perth 12.9 (81)	def. by	Swan Districts 17.15 (117)	Arena Joondalup (crowd: 2562)
Saturday, 2 May (2:15 pm)	Claremont 16.13 (109)	def. by	Peel Thunder 17.11 (113)	Claremont Oval (crowd: 1219)
Sunday, 3 May (2:15 pm)	East Fremantle 17.9 (111)	def. by	Perth 20.4 (124)	East Fremantle Oval (crowd: 2262)
Sunday, 3 May (2:15 pm)	East Perth 7.10 (52)	def. by	South Fremantle 22.18 (150)	Leederville Oval (crowd: 2370)
	Bye; Subiaco

=== Round 8 ===
	Round 8
Saturday, 9 May (2:15 pm)	Subiaco 15.17 (107)	def.	East Fremantle 8.9 (57)	Leederville Oval (crowd: 1890)
Saturday, 9 May (2:15 pm)	Perth 10.10 (70)	def. by	Claremont 13.21 (99)	Lathlain Park (crowd: 2453)
Saturday, 9 May (2:15 pm)	Swan Districts 18.12 (120)	def.	East Perth 12.9 (81)	Bassendean Oval (crowd: 2783)
Saturday, 9 May (2:15 pm)	Peel Thunder 12.8 (80)	def. by	West Perth 19.16 (130)	Rushton Park (crowd: 1601)
	Bye; South Fremantle

=== Round 9 ===
	Round 9
Saturday, 16 May (2:15 pm)	Subiaco 25.15 (165)	def.	Perth 9.9 (63)	Leederville Oval (crowd: 1887)
Saturday, 16 May (2:15 pm)	East Fremantle 7.7 (49)	def. by	Swan Districts 20.9 (129)	East Fremantle Oval (crowd: 2070)
Saturday, 16 May (2:15 pm)	West Perth 15.12 (102)	def.	Claremont 12.13 (85)	Arena Joondalup (crowd: 1952)
Saturday, 16 May (2:15 pm)	South Fremantle 23.16 (154)	def.	Peel Thunder 13.15 (93)	Fremantle Oval (crowd: 1499)
	Bye; East Perth

=== Round 10 (Foundation Day) ===
	Round 10
Saturday, 30 May (2:15 pm)	Peel Thunder 15.22 (112)	def. by	Swan Districts 19.11 (125)	Rushton Park (crowd: 2006)
Monday, 1 June (2:15 pm)	East Fremantle 18.7 (115)	def.	South Fremantle 17.12 (114)	East Fremantle Oval (crowd: 11,051)
Monday, 1 June (2:15 pm)	West Perth 12.15 (87)	def.	East Perth 13.7 (85)	Arena Joondalup (crowd: 3996)
Monday, 1 June (2:15 pm)	Claremont 11.12 (78)	def. by	Subiaco 17.14 (116)	Claremont Oval (crowd: 2367)
	Bye; Perth

=== Round 11 ===
	Round 11
Saturday, 6 June (2:15 pm)	Perth 11.9 (75)	def. by	Peel Thunder 17.11 (113)	Lathlain Park (crowd: 2010)
Saturday, 6 June (2:15 pm)	West Perth 12.10 (82)	def.	Subiaco 11.10 (76)	Arena Joondalup (crowd: 2271)
Saturday, 6 June (2:15 pm)	Swan Districts 15.11 (101)	def.	South Fremantle 12.11 (83)	Bassendean Oval (crowd: 4265)
Saturday, 6 June (2:15 pm)	East Perth 9.11 (65)	def. by	Claremont 18.13 (121)	Leederville Oval (crowd: 1701)
	Bye; East Fremantle

=== Round 12 ===
	Round 12
Saturday, 13 June (2:15 pm)	Perth 15.19 (109)	def.	East Perth 8.13 (61)	Lathlain Park (crowd: 2425)
Saturday, 13 June (2:15 pm)	Peel Thunder 10.13 (73)	def. by	East Fremantle 15.20 (110)	Rushton Park (crowd: 1888)
Saturday, 13 June (2:15 pm)	Subiaco 16.14 (110)	def.	Swan Districts 13.11 (89)	Leederville Oval (crowd: 3244)
Saturday, 13 June (2:15 pm)	South Fremantle 21.19 (145)	def.	West Perth 10.4 (64)	Fremantle Oval (crowd: 2130)
	Bye; Claremont

=== Round 13 ===
	Round 13
Saturday, 20 June (2:15 pm)	Claremont 11.17 (83)	def.	East Fremantle 10.9 (69)	Claremont Oval (crowd: 1412)
Saturday, 20 June (2:15 pm)	Swan Districts 18.7 (115)	def.	Perth 8.21 (69)	Bassendean Oval (crowd: 2022)
Saturday, 20 June (2:15 pm)	South Fremantle 10.14 (74)	def. by	Subiaco 15.12 (102)	Fremantle Oval (crowd: 2025)
Saturday, 20 June (2:15 pm)	East Perth 16.12 (108)	def.	Peel Thunder 10.12 (72)	Margaret River (crowd: 1948)
	Bye; West Perth
Swan Districts record their biggest with fewer scoring shots, and the biggest in the WAFL since 1994

=== Round 14 ===
	Round 14
Saturday, 27 June (2:15 pm)	Perth 10.10 (70)	def. by	South Fremantle 16.13 (109)	Lathlain Park (crowd: 2639)
Saturday, 27 June (2:15 pm)	Claremont 12.11 (83)	def.	West Perth 10.9 (69)	Claremont Oval (crowd: 1232)
Saturday, 27 June (2:15 pm)	East Fremantle 4.12 (36)	def. by	East Perth 12.13 (85)	East Fremantle Oval (crowd: 1152)
Saturday, 27 June (2:15 pm)	Subiaco 26.14 (170)	def.	Peel Thunder 9.9 (63)	Leederville Oval (crowd: 1327)
	Bye; Swan Districts

=== Round 15 ===
	Round 15
Saturday, 4 July (2:15 pm)	West Perth 16.7 (103)	def. by	Perth 21.12 (138)	Arena Joondalup (crowd: 3226)
Saturday, 4 July (2:15 pm)	Swan Districts 24.14 (158)	def.	East Fremantle 8.12 (60)	Bassendean Oval (crowd: 2317)
Saturday, 4 July (2:15 pm)	South Fremantle 25.11 (161)	def.	Claremont 12.11 (83)	Fremantle Oval (crowd: 1807)
Saturday, 4 July (2:15 pm)	East Perth 13.5 (83)	def.	Subiaco 10.18 (78)	Leederville Oval (crowd: 2373)
	Bye; Peel Thunder

=== Round 16 ===
	Round 16
Friday, 10 July (6:40 pm)	South Fremantle 17.16 (118)	def.	East Perth 11.5 (71)	Fremantle Oval (crowd: 1373)
Saturday, 11 July (2:15 pm)	Perth 16.15 (111)	def.	East Fremantle 11.8 (74)	Lathlain Park (crowd: 2272)
Saturday, 11 July (2:15 pm)	Swan Districts 16.13 (109)	drew with	West Perth 16.13 (109)	Bassendean Oval (crowd: 2967)
Saturday, 11 July (2:15 pm)	Peel Thunder 17.10 (112)	def. by	Claremont 20.11 (131)	Rushton Park (crowd: 1417)
	Bye; Subiaco

=== Round 17 ===
	Round 17
Saturday, 18 July (2:15 pm)	Claremont 11.8 (74)	def. by	Perth 14.15 (99)	Claremont Oval (crowd: 1379)
Saturday, 18 July (2:15 pm)	East Fremantle 9.9 (63)	def. by	Subiaco 13.16 (94)	East Fremantle Oval (crowd: 1512)
Saturday, 18 July (2:15 pm)	West Perth 12.13 (85)	def.	Peel Thunder 5.14 (44)	Corrigin (crowd: 1900)
Saturday, 18 July (2:15 pm)	East Perth 20.13 (133)	def.	Swan Districts 13.11 (89)	Leederville Oval (crowd: 1943)
	Bye; South Fremantle

=== Round 18 ===
	Round 18
Friday, 24 July (6:30 pm)	Subiaco 11.12 (78)	def. by	South Fremantle 14.11 (95)	Leederville Oval (crowd: 2128)
Saturday, 25 July (2:15 pm)	Peel Thunder 11.9 (75)	def. by	East Perth 19.8 (122)	Rushton Park (crowd: 1226)
	Bye; Claremont, East Fremantle, Perth, Swan Districts, West Perth

=== Round 19 ===
	Round 19
Saturday, 1 August (2:15 pm)	Perth 13.14 (92)	def. by	Subiaco 18.11 (119)	Lathlain Park (crowd: 2527)
Saturday, 1 August (2:15 pm)	Claremont 9.11 (65)	def. by	Swan Districts 23.14 (152)	Claremont Oval (crowd: 2933)
Saturday, 1 August (2:15 pm)	West Perth 22.14 (146)	def.	East Fremantle 7.14 (56)	Arena Joondalup (crowd: 2007)
Saturday, 1 August (2:15 pm)	Peel Thunder 10.15 (75)	def. by	South Fremantle 28.9 (177)	Anniversary Park (crowd: 2241)
	Bye; East Perth

=== Round 20 ===
	Round 20
Saturday, 8 August (2:15 pm)	Perth 8.10 (58)	def. by	East Perth 28.8 (176)	Lathlain Park (crowd: 2183)
Saturday, 8 August (2:15 pm)	East Fremantle 19.10 (124)	def.	Claremont 14.12 (96)	East Fremantle Oval (crowd: 1403)
Saturday, 8 August (2:15 pm)	Subiaco 14.18 (102)	def.	Swan Districts 13.11 (89)	Leederville Oval (crowd: 2629)
Saturday, 8 August (2:15 pm)	South Fremantle 9.20 (74)	def.	West Perth 10.7 (67)	Fremantle Oval (crowd: 1623)
	Bye; Peel Thunder

=== Round 21 ===
	Round 21
Friday, 14 August (7:40 pm)	South Fremantle 8.19 (67)	def.	East Fremantle 7.9 (51)	Fremantle Oval (crowd: 2394)
Saturday, 15 August (2:15 pm)	Swan Districts 13.13 (91)	drew with	Perth 13.13 (91)	Bassendean Oval (crowd: 1537)
Saturday, 15 August (2:15 pm)	Peel Thunder 8.9 (57)	def. by	Claremont 15.15 (105)	Rushton Park (crowd: 932)
Saturday, 15 August (2:15 pm)	East Perth 12.17 (89)	def.	West Perth 11.7 (73)	Leederville Oval (crowd: 2289)
	Bye; Subiaco
The Bassendean Oval draw produced the first season since 1969 with multiple drawn games; indeed the first time since 1970 when consecutive WANFL/WAFL/WASFL/Westar Rules draws had ever been closer apart than one season.

=== Round 22 ===
	Round 22
Saturday, 22 August (2:15 pm)	Perth 24.19 (163)	def.	Peel Thunder 6.7 (43)	Lathlain Park (crowd: 1771)
Saturday, 22 August (2:15 pm)	Claremont 21.9 (135)	def.	West Perth 11.9 (75)	Claremont Oval (crowd: 1405)
Saturday, 22 August (2:15 pm)	East Fremantle 9.6 (60)	def. by	Swan Districts 19.23 (137)	East Fremantle Oval (crowd: 1401)
Saturday, 22 August (2:15 pm)	East Perth 8.14 (62)	def. by	Subiaco 11.13 (79)	Leederville Oval (crowd: 2295)
	Bye; South Fremantle

=== Round 23 ===
	Round 23
Saturday, 29 August (2:15 pm)	Claremont 11.8 (74)	def. by	Perth 10.16 (76)	Claremont Oval (crowd: 1660)
Saturday, 29 August (2:15 pm)	West Perth 15.7 (97)	def.	Subiaco 14.6 (90)	Arena Joondalup (crowd: 2537)
Saturday, 29 August (2:15 pm)	Swan Districts 12.8 (80)	def. by	South Fremantle 22.11 (143)	Bassendean Oval (crowd: 3427)
Saturday, 29 August (2:15 pm)	Peel Thunder 11.13 (79)	def. by	East Fremantle 23.6 (144)	Rushton Park (crowd: 1330)
	Bye; East Perth

== Ladder ==
2009 ladder
Pos	Team	Pld	W	L	D	PF	PA	PP	Pts
1	South Fremantle (P)	20	15	5	0	2256	1647	137.0	60
2	Subiaco	20	13	7	0	2064	1663	124.1	52
3	Swan Districts	20	11	7	2	2142	1823	117.5	48
4	West Perth	20	10	9	1	1870	1939	96.4	42
5	East Perth	20	10	10	0	1777	1766	100.6	40
6	Perth	20	9	10	1	1847	1949	94.8	38
7	East Fremantle	20	8	12	0	1656	1993	83.1	32
8	Claremont	20	7	13	0	1818	1969	92.3	28
9	Peel Thunder	20	5	15	0	1705	2386	71.5	20

Source: WAFL Footy Facts
Rules for classification: 1) points; 2) percentage; 3) number of points for.
(P) Premiers

== Finals ==
=== First semi-final ===
	First semi-final
Saturday, 5 September (2:15 pm)	Swan Districts 16.14 (110)	def.	West Perth 10.13 (73)	Bassendean Oval (crowd: 5,150)

=== Second semi-final ===
	Second semi-final
Saturday, 5 September (2:15 pm)	South Fremantle 19.21 (135)	def.	Subiaco 10.5 (65)	Fremantle Oval (crowd: 3,646)

=== Preliminary final ===
	Preliminary final
Saturday, 12 September (2:15 pm)	Subiaco 13.11 (89)	def.	Swan Districts 9.16 (70)	Leederville Oval (crowd: 5,831)
A wasteful 1.7 (13) in the last quarter kicks Swan Districts out of a second straight Grand Final berth.

=== Grand Final ===
2009 WAFL Grand Final
South Fremantle	def.	Subiaco	Subiaco Oval (crowd: 22,738)
5.3 (33); 8.8 (56); 15.10 (100); 17.11 (113)	Q1; Q2; Q3; Final	3.4 (22); 5.8 (38); 7.11 (53); 13.17 (95)	Umpires: Stuart Parry, Craig Hendrie, Gavin Statham; Simpson Medal: Ashton Hams (South Fremantle)
Wilson 5, Wilkie 2, Mugambwa 2, Theo Adams 2, Kyle Hams, Bell, Graham, Siegert, Head, Farmer	Goals	Dennis-Lane 4, Fletcher 2, Keevers 2, Pickett, Broadhurst, Newick, Cossom, Adamson-Holmes
Ashton Hams, Bell, Kyle Hams, Wilson, Miller, Hunt	Best	Fletcher, Stenglein, Keevers, Pickett, Hildebrandt, Webb
Subiaco fail to farewell retiring stars Stenglein, Fletcher, Smith, Maplestone and Pickett with a fourth successive flag, owing to the power of the Bulldogs’ “engine room”.
