= Dennis Blair =

Dennis Blair may refer to:

- Dennis Blair (baseball) (born 1954), former Major League Baseball pitcher
- Dennis Blair (comedian) (born 1955), American stand-up comedian
- Dennis Blair (cricketer) (born 1934), Australian cricketer
- Dennis Blair (footballer) (born 1951), former Australian rules footballer
- Dennis C. Blair (born 1947), former U.S. Director of National Intelligence and retired U.S. Navy admiral
