= LeCras =

LeCras is a surname. Notable people with the surname include:

- Brent LeCras (born 1981), Australian rules football player
- Mark LeCras (born 1986), Australian rules football player
