= Trent Dennis-Lane =

Australian rules footballer (born 1988)

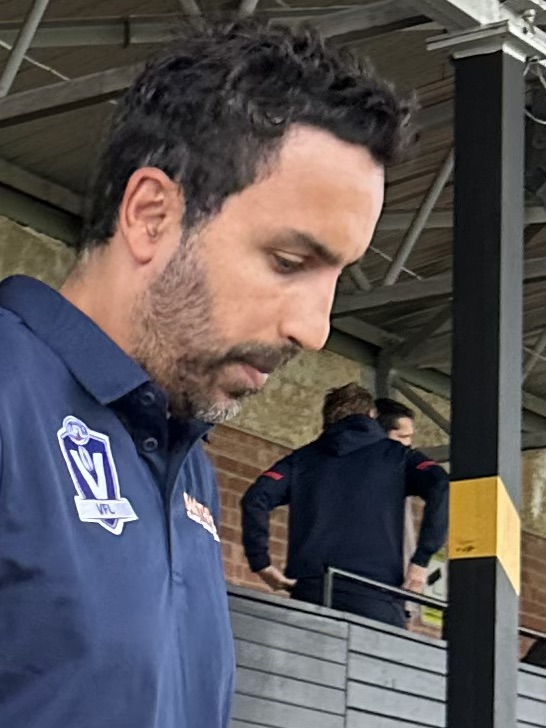
- Dennis-Lane in April 2026

Personal information
- Nickname: TDL
- Born: 30 August 1988 (age 38)
- Original team: Subiaco (WAFL)
- Draft: No. 55, 2009 national draft
- Height: 181 cm (5 ft 11 in)
- Weight: 75 kg (165 lb)

Playing career
Years	Club	Games (Goals)
2010–2012	Sydney	19 (30)
2013–2014	St Kilda	10 (9)
Total		29 (39)

Career highlights
- Stan Milton Medal: 2026; 2x Sandringham leading goalkicker: 2013, 2014; Subiaco leading goalkicker: 2009

Trent Dennis-Lane (born 30 August 1988) is an Australian rules football coach and former player who currently serves as the coach of Greater Western Sydney in the Victorian Football League (VFL). He previously played for Sydney and St Kilda in the Australian Football League (AFL).

== Early career ==
Dennis-Lane made his senior debut for the Subiaco Football Club in the West Australian Football League (WAFL) in 2007. He played five senior matches during the season and a further thirteen in 2008. In 2009, Dennis-Lane played all 23 matches for Subiaco and kicked 66 goals, including four goals in the club's 18-point grand final loss to South Fremantle.

== AFL career ==
=== Sydney (2010–2012) ===
On 26 November 2009, Dennis-Lane was drafted to the Sydney Swans in the Australian Football League (AFL) with the 55th selection in the 2009 national draft. He had trained with Fremantle Football Club ahead of the draft, but he had been told by the club that they would not select him.

During the 2010 AFL preseason, Dennis-Lane kicked five goals during an intraclub match. He initially played for Sydney's reserves team in the AFL Canberra competition, kicking seven goals in a victory over Belconnen, before eventually making his AFL debut in round 14 against Richmond at the Melbourne Cricket Ground. After being dropped to the reserves, he returned to the senior team for the late stages of the 2010 season, kicking four goals against the Western Bulldogs and another four in the elimination final against Carlton, which also included a chasedown tackle on Dennis Armfield that secured Sydney's victory.

Although he kicked seven goals in an intraclub preseason match, Dennis-Lane only played three AFL matches during the 2011 season. In 2012, he played eight senior matches and was named as an emergency for Sydney's grand final victory over Hawthorn.

=== St Kilda (2013–2014) ===
On 26 October 2012, Dennis-Lane was traded to the St Kilda Football Club. He played nine senior matches for the club in 2013 but only one in 2014, instead mostly playing for St Kilda's reserves affiliate – the Sandringham Football Club – in the Victorian Football League (VFL). Dennis-Lane was delisted by St Kilda on 2 September 2014.

== Post-AFL career ==
Dennis-Lane joined Sandringham as a VFL-listed player for the 2015 season. Following the departure of Adam Cockie, he became the club's captain for the 2016 season. He left Sandringham to join Bonbeach in the Mornington Peninsula Nepean Football League (MPNFL) in 2017, kicking 280 goals in 94 games at the club until the end of the 2023 season. While still playing for Bonbeach in the MPNFL, Dennis-Lane returned to Sandringham to serve as an assistant coach. In round 16 of the 2021 VFL season, Dennis-Lane played his first match for Sandringham in more than 1,500 days after entering the side as an emergency, recording seven disposals and kicking two goals in a 49-point loss to Carlton.

In 2023, Dennis-Lane left his role at Sandringham to become the head coach of the Western Jets in the Talent League Boys competition. He continued playing football at the local level and moved to Dingley in the Southern Football Netball League (SFNL) in 2024, playing in the club's Division 1 grand final loss to Cheltenham the same year. After two seasons at the Western Jets, he returned to New South Wales to join the Greater Western Sydney Giants in the AFL as a development coach. He was named as an assistant coach for the VFL in an interstate representative match against the South Australian National Football League (SANFL) in April 2026. While playing for the Manly Warringah Wolves in the AFL Sydney Premier Division during the 2026 season, he won the Stan Milton Medal as the competition's leading goalkicker with 53 goals from twelve matches, including 17 goals in a match against the Inner West Magpies.

Because of a shortage of players due to injuries, Dennis-Lane played for the Giants' VFL team against Sydney in round 18 of the 2026 season, kicking four goals in a 78-point loss at ENGIE Stadium. On 16 October 2026, Greater Western Sydney announced Dennis-Lane would be the club's new VFL coach for the 2027 season, succeeding Robbie Chancellor.

== Statistics ==
=== Playing statistics ===
Legend
G	Goals	K	Kicks	D	Disposals	T	Tackles
B	Behinds	H	Handballs	M	Marks

==== AFL ====
Season	Team	No.	Games	Totals							Averages (per game)							Votes
Season	Team	No.	Games	G	B	K	H	D	M	T	G	B	K	H	D	M	T	Votes
2010	Sydney	8	8	18	8	52	22	74	33	11	2.3	0.8	6.5	2.8	9.3	4.1	1.4	3
2011	Sydney	8	3	3	3	11	8	19	5	5	1.0	1.0	3.7	2.7	6.3	1.7	1.7	0
2012	Sydney	8	8	9	3	37	16	53	21	25	1.1	0.4	4.6	2.0	6.6	2.6	3.1	0
2013	St Kilda	8	9	9	9	43	33	76	33	33	1.0	1.0	4.8	3.7	8.4	3.7	3.7	0
2014	St Kilda	8	1	0	2	5	1	6	2	1	0.0	2.0	5.0	1.0	6.0	2.0	1.0	0
Career			29	39	23	148	80	228	94	75	1.3	0.8	5.1	2.8	7.9	3.2	2.6	3

==== VFL ====
Season	Team	No.	Games	Totals							Averages (per game)							Votes
Season	Team	No.	Games	G	B	K	H	D	M	T	G	B	K	H	D	M	T	Votes
2013	Sandringham	34	9	24							2.7							2
2014	Sandringham	34	17	35							2.1							0
2015	Sandringham	8	16	23							1.4							0
2016	Sandringham	8	13	27							2.1							
2021	Sandringham	84	1	2	2	4	3	7	5	0	2.0	2.0	4.0	3.0	7.0	5.0	0.0	— (Note: The J. J. Liston Trophy was not awarded in 2021 because the season was curtailed due to the impact of the COVID-19 pandemic.)
2026	Greater Western Sydney	60	1	4	2	6	2	8	6	0	4.0	2.0	6.0	2.0	8.0	6.0	0.0	0
Career			57	114														

=== Coaching statistics ===
Legend
W	Wins	L	Losses	D	Draws	W%	Winning percentage	LP	Ladder position	LT	League teams

Season	Team	League	Games	W	L	D	W %	Ladder
2023	Western Jets	TLB	14	4	10	0	28.6%	12 / 18
2024	Western Jets	TLB	16	5	11	0	31.3%	10 / 18
2027	Greater Western Sydney	VFL	0	0	0	0	—	—

== Personal life ==
Dennis-Lane is of Burmese descent, with his father moving to Australia at the age of 13.
