= Milan Murdock =

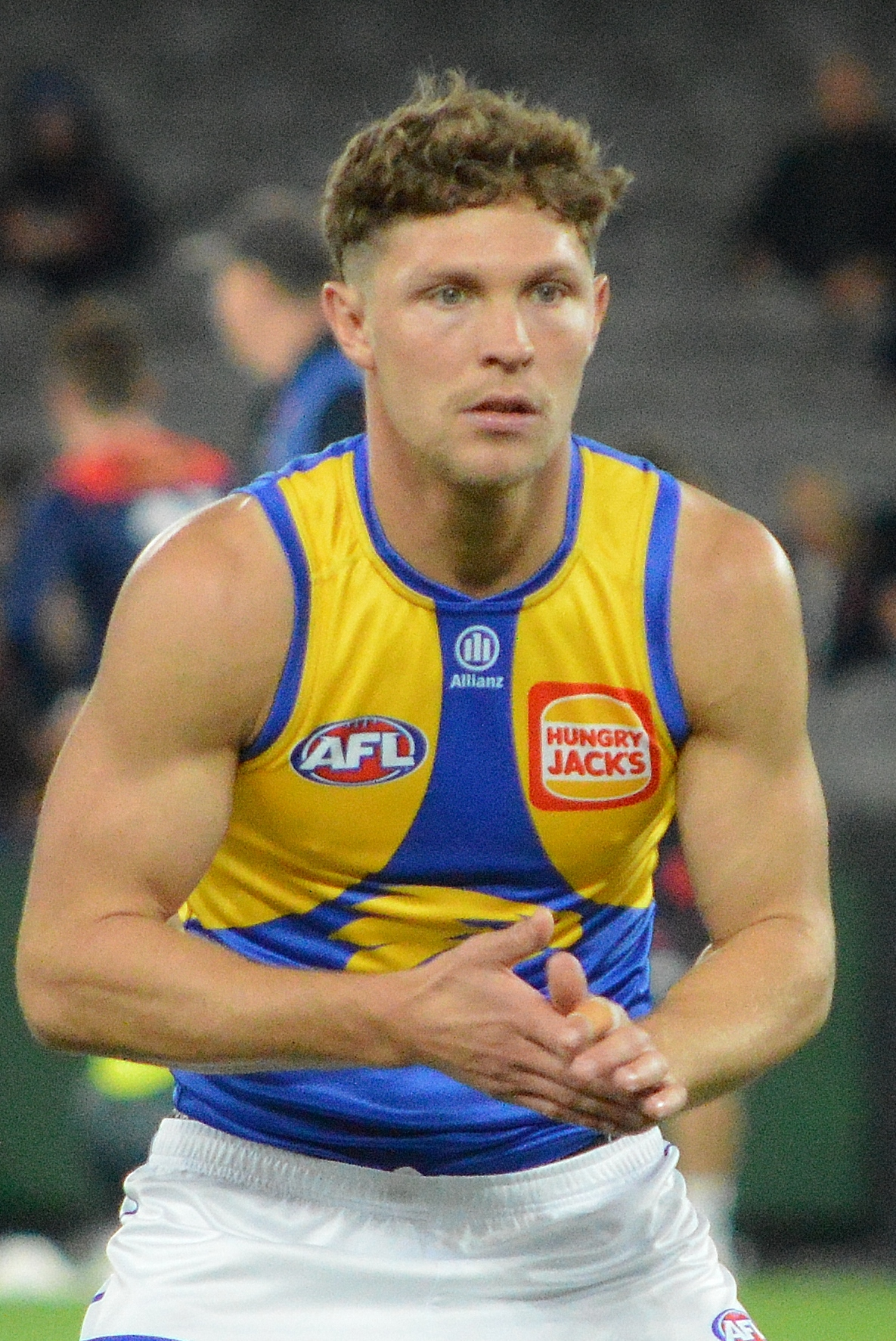
- Murdock in May 2026

Personal information
- Born: 30 June 2000 (age 26)
- Original team: East Fremantle
- Draft: 2026 pre-season supplemental selection period
- Debut: Round 1, 2026, West Coast vs. Gold Coast, at Carrara Stadium
- Height: 180 cm (5 ft 11 in)
- Position: Midfielder

Club information
- Current club: West Coast
- Number: 47

Playing career^{1}
Years	Club	Games (Goals)
2026–	West Coast	20 (19)
- ^{1} Playing statistics correct to the end of the 2026 season.

Career highlights
- WAFL premiership player: 2023; Simpson Medal: 2023 (Grand Final), 2024 & 2025 (State games); Lynn Medallist: 2022, 2024 & 2025

Milan Murdock (born 30 June 2000) is a professional Australian rules footballer who plays for the West Coast Eagles in the Australian Football League (AFL).

== WAFL career ==
Murdock began playing for East Fremantle in the WAFL Colts. He played in the WAFL league from 2018.

In 2023, Murdock won the Simpson Medal as best on ground in the 2023 WAFL Grand Final. He also won the Lynn Medal as East Fremantle's best and fairest player in 2022, 2024 and 2025.

Murdock was also the recipient of the Simpson Medal in the 2024 and 2025 interstate representative matches for Western Australia.

== AFL career ==
Murdock was selected by West Coast during the 2026 pre-season supplemental selection period. He made his debut in round 1 of the 2026 AFL season. In the first quarter, after receiving a holding the ball free kick and 50-metre penalty, Murdock kicked his first AFL goal with his first AFL kick. He finished the game with 22 disposals and two goals.

== Statistics ==
Updated to the end of round 22, 2026.

Legend
G	Goals	K	Kicks	D	Disposals	T	Tackles
B	Behinds	H	Handballs	M	Marks

Season	Team	No.	Games	Totals							Averages (per game)							Votes
Season	Team	No.	Games	G	B	K	H	D	M	T	G	B	K	H	D	M	T	Votes
2026	West Coast	47	18	15	6	143	146	289	42	73	0.8	0.3	7.9	8.1	16.1	2.3	4.1	0
Career			18	15	6	143	146	289	42	73	0.8	0.3	7.9	8.1	16.1	2.3	4.1	0
