= Josh Mellington =

Australian rules footballer

Personal information
- Full name: Josh Mellington
- Born: 29 December 1992 (age 33)
- Original team: Murray Bushrangers (TAC Cup)
- Draft: 1. 56, 2010 National draft, Fremantle
- Height: 187 cm (6 ft 2 in)
- Weight: 78 kg (172 lb)
- Position: Defender

Club information
- Current club: Fremantle
- Number: 25

Playing career^{1}
Years	Club	Games (Goals)
2011–2013	Fremantle	6 (5)
- ^{1} Playing statistics correct to the end of 2013.

Career highlights
- WAFL Premiership Player (2013)

Josh Mellington (born 29 December 1992) is a former Australian rules footballer with the Fremantle Football Club, in the Australian Football League (AFL).

Originally from Benalla, Mellington played junior football for the Murray Bushrangers in the TAC Cup. In 2010, Mellington led the Bushrangers' goalkicking, with 41 for the season, and finished fourth in the TAC Cup best and fairest. He was "shocked" when drafted by Fremantle with their third selection, 56th overall, in the 2010 AFL draft.

A small forward, Mellington played his first games for Fremantle in a NAB Cup pre-season double header against Hawthorn and West Coast on 14 February 2011.

He made his official AFL debut in Round 14 of the 2011 AFL season against Brisbane Lions at Patersons Stadium. Mellington was delisted by Fremantle following the 2013 AFL season after only playing six games in his three-year stint at the club.

In 2021 Mellington kicked 27 goals in a game for Violet Town against Tallygaroopna while playing in the Kyabram District Football League.
