= 2013 WAFL Grand Final =

| West Perth | East Perth |
|---|---|
| 20.11 (131) | 12.10 (82) |
- Date: 22 September 2013
- Stadium: Patersons Stadium
- Attendance: 20,008

Accolades
- Simpson Medallist: Mark Hutchings (West Perth)

Broadcast in Australia
- Network: ABC1 (television); 720 ABC (radio); ABC Grandstand (radio/online)

The 2013 WAFL Grand Final was an Australian rules football game contested between the West Perth Football Club and the East Perth Football Club on Sunday 22 September 2013 at Patersons Stadium, to determine the premier team of the West Australian Football League (WAFL) for the 2013 season.

West Perth won the game by 49 points - 20.11 (131) to 12.10 (82) - and Mark Hutchings of West Perth was awarded the Simpson Medal. The win gave West Perth's 19th WAFL premiership.

== Match details ==
2013 WAFL Grand Final
Sunday, 22 September 2:15pm | West Perth | def. | East Perth | Patersons Stadium (crowd: 20,008) | Source
4.2 (26); 10.3 (63); 13.7 (85); 20.11 (131) | Q1; Q2; Q3; Final | 5.2 (32); 8.4 (52); 11.8 (74); 12.10 (82) | Simpson Medal: Mark Hutchings; Television broadcast: ABC1

== Teams ==
West Perth
| B: | 20 Laine Rasmussen | 12 Daniel Hunt | 7 Steven Browne |
| HB: | 3 Andrew Strijk | 20 Shaun Marusic | 5 Jordan Jones |
| C: | 1 Aaron Black | 8 Mark Hutchings | 4 Rohan Kerr |
| HF: | 2 Jason Salecic (c) | 40 Josh Mellington | 6 Marc Crisp |
| F: | 47 Kody Manning | 17 Matthew Fowler | 44 Nicholas Rodda |
| Foll: | 19 Chris Keunen | 18 Jay Van Berlo | 10 Matthe Guadagnin |
| Int: | 25 Ray Bartholomew | 14 Shane Nelson | 23 Luke Tedesco |
| Int: | 27 Steve Potente | | |
| Coach: | Bill Monaghan | | |

East Perth
| B: | 11 Ryan Maldenis | 6 Kyle Anderson | 18 Jacob Derickx |
| HB: | 16 Jarrad Oakley-Nicholls | 20 Blayne Wilson | 37 Mitch Fraser |
| C: | 28 Cale Morton | 7 Brendan Lee | 2 Steven Payne |
| HF: | 5 Aaron Sweet | 22 Scott Lycett | 13 Craig Wulff (c) |
| F: | 44 Michael Swan | 15 Josh Smith | 1 Dean Cadwallader |
| Foll: | 19 Paul Johnson | 39 Adam Selwood | 27 Jamie Cripps |
| Int: | 4 Cameron Grover | 3 Matt Seal | 46 Arthur Bennell |
| Int: | 12 Marcus White | | |
| Coach: | Brian Dawson | | |
