= Zane Parsons =

Australian rules footballer

Personal information
- Full name: Zane Parsons
- Born: 6 November 1976 (age 49)
- Original team: Wagin Magpies (UGSFL)
- Height: 186 cm (6 ft 1 in)
- Weight: 78 kg (172 lb) (as of 1998)
- Position: Forward

Playing career
Years	Club	Games (Goals)
1995–2004	South Fremantle	74 (179)

Representative team honours
Years	Team	Games (Goals)
1999–2002	Western Australia	2 (9)

Career highlights
- South Fremantle leading goalkicker 1998, 2002, 2003; Bernie Naylor Medal 2002; South Fremantle best and fairest 2002

Zane Parsons (born 6 November 1976) is a former Australian rules footballer who played for the South Fremantle Football Club in the West Australian Football League (WAFL). From Wagin, Parsons played most of his career in the forward line, and was South Fremantle's leading goalkicker in 1998, 2002, and 2003. In 2002, he kicked 65 goals to win the Bernie Naylor Medal as the competition's leading goalkicker, and additionally won South Fremantle's best and fairest award, the W. J. Hughes Medal. Parsons was hampered by injury throughout his career, playing only 74 games in ten seasons at the club, from which he kicked 179 goals. He also represented Western Australia twice in interstate matches.

== Football career ==
From Wagin, a town in Western Australia's Wheatbelt region, Parsons played for the Wagin Magpies in the Upper Great Southern Football League (UGSFL), making his senior debut at the age of 16. Teams from the UGSFL fell into South Fremantle's recruiting zone, and Parsons played in several South Fremantle underage sides. He was also chosen in Western Australia's initial squad for the 1994 AFL Under 18 Championships, but did not make the final team. Parsons made his senior WAFL debut against East Fremantle in round two of the 1995 season. He went on to play two further matches, kicking three goals in round 17 and remaining in the team the following week. During the 1996 season, he missed ten weeks following a shoulder reconstruction, and was also hampered by an ankle injury sustained in the pre-season, playing only five games in total. The following season, he dislocated his knee during the pre-season, and played only three games.

Parsons appeared more regularly during the 1998 season, especially in the first half of the year. Despite playing only 11 matches, Parsons led South Fremantle's goalkicking with 25 goals, and was named "player of the future" at the club's best and fairest awards. Early in the season, he had been suspended for two weeks for striking Perth's Richard Pang. For the 1999 season, South Fremantle served as the affiliate team for Fremantle in the Australian Football League (AFL). However, Parsons was able to maintain his place in the team, kicking 34 goals from 16 games, including two five-goal hauls. Good form early in the season led to his selection in the state team that played Tasmania in June 1999, at the Sir Richard Moore Sports Complex in Kalgoorlie. Western Australia won the match by 58 points, with Parsons kicking three goals and Rod Tregenza kicking ten goals.

While training before the start of the 2000 season, Parsons had another player fall on his ankle, with the resulting surgery forcing him to miss the entire season. He completed the following pre-season, and was named in the club's first match, but nearly severed his thumb in a work accident, forcing him to miss several weeks. Several other injuries, including a bout of influenza, meant Parsons did not play at senior level until round seventeen, playing three consecutive games which were his only for the season. He was, however, named in South Fremantle's initial 25-man squads for their preliminary final against Claremont and the grand final against East Perth, but did not play in either match, with South Fremantle losing the grand final.

Playing 18 games, Parsons kicked 65 goals during the 2002 season, winning the Bernie Naylor Medal as the competition's leading goal-kicker. In round eight, against Swan Districts in Wickepin, he kicked a career-best nine goals, in what was his 50th senior game. He recorded several other large hauls throughout the season, including six goals in the previous round against Subiaco, and consecutive eight-goal games against Claremont and Peel Thunder in rounds 12 and 13, respectively. Parsons also played in the June 2002 state game against Queensland, kicking six goals. At the end of the season, he won South Fremantle's best and fairest award, the W. J. Hughes Medal, and also placed equal twelfth in the Sandover Medal, tying with Claremont's Myles Quinn on 18 votes.

Despite missing several games due to groin and thigh problems, Parsons again led the Bulldogs' goalkicking during the 2003 season, finishing with 47 goals from 14 games. This included hauls of seven, six, and five goals between rounds 19 and 21, and two other six-goal hauls. He was, however, inaccurate at times, kicking four behinds in one game and seven in another. The 2004 season was Parsons' last in the WAFL. His only game for the season came in round two, against Swan Districts. Parsons had suffered a knee injury during the pre-season and later missed almost three months to a calf injury, and then several weeks to a torn hamstring. He retired at the end of the 2004 season, returning to Wagin to play country football.

== Playing style ==
Standing 186 centimetres (6 ft 1 in) tall, Parsons played at full forward or centre half-forward in underage matches, but was considered a utility player early in his WAFL career. Later, however, he played almost exclusively in the forward line, both on the half-forward flank and as a key-position player. At times during the 2002 and 2003 seasons, he was considered South Fremantle's "spearhead". During the 1998 season, when Parsons was aged 21, one writer in The West Australian described him as an "exceptionally good reader of the ball" and an "excellent long right-foot kick", but criticised his pace and his defensive game. Another source noted his "ability to take a big mark and to kick team-lifting goals". Parsons nominated several times for the AFL draft, but was never selected. At the 1998 draft, he was considered an "outside chance" to be drafted, while Port Adelaide expressed interest in selecting him at the 2002 draft, following his career-best season for South Fremantle.
