= 2009 WAFL Grand Final =

The 2009 West Australian Football League (WAFL) Grand Final was the culmination of the 115th season of the premier Australian rules football league in Western Australia. It was played at Subiaco Oval on 20 September 2009 and won by the South Fremantle Football Club who defeated the Subiaco Football Club by 18 points.

== Build up ==
Much curiosity from football fans preceded the contest. South Fremantle had finished on top of the ladder in season 2009, two games clear of Subiaco who had finished in second place. However Subiaco had won the previous three Premierships and this would be their fourth consecutive Grand Final appearance (and their sixth in seven years). Between them the two combatants had won every WAFL Premiership since 2004.

== Match summary ==
Early on South Fremantle had the bulk of the scoring opportunities, however of all these were not executed in effective manner, despite this the Bulldogs held a firm eleven point lead at the end of the first quarter.

Subiaco opened the second term in much better fashion and at one stage even looked like snatching the lead, South Fremantle steadied though to win the quarter and open a three-goal lead by the main break.

Whatever chances the Lions had of getting back into the contest were quickly dashed in the third quarter as South Fremantle ran rampant and opened up a match winning lead by the last change, with a resounding seven goal to two quarter.

The match was effectively over early in the final term, when the Bulldogs opened up a 53-point margin, save for a strong last ten minutes from Subiaco, South Fremantle had controlled virtually the entire match and deservedly went on to claim the flag. Ashton Hams was judged the best player and won the Simpson Medal.

	QT	HT	TQT	Final
South Fremantle	5.3(33)	8.8(56)	15.10(100)	17.11(113)
Subiaco	3.4(22)	5.8(38)	7.11(53)	13.17(95)

== Other grand finals ==
Earlier in the day, South Fremantle also won the reserves grand final, defeating West Perth. South Fremantle's Hayden North, who was surprisingly left out of the league team, won the Merv McIntosh Medal as the best player. The previous evening saw Claremont win the colts premiership, defeating Peel Thunder Football Club, with Lewis Broome from Claremont winning the Mel Whinnen Medal as the best player.

== Aftermath ==
The win ensured South Fremantle's thirteenth WAFL Premiership and ended Subiaco's Premiership winning streak.
