= Mark Hutchings =

Australian rules footballer

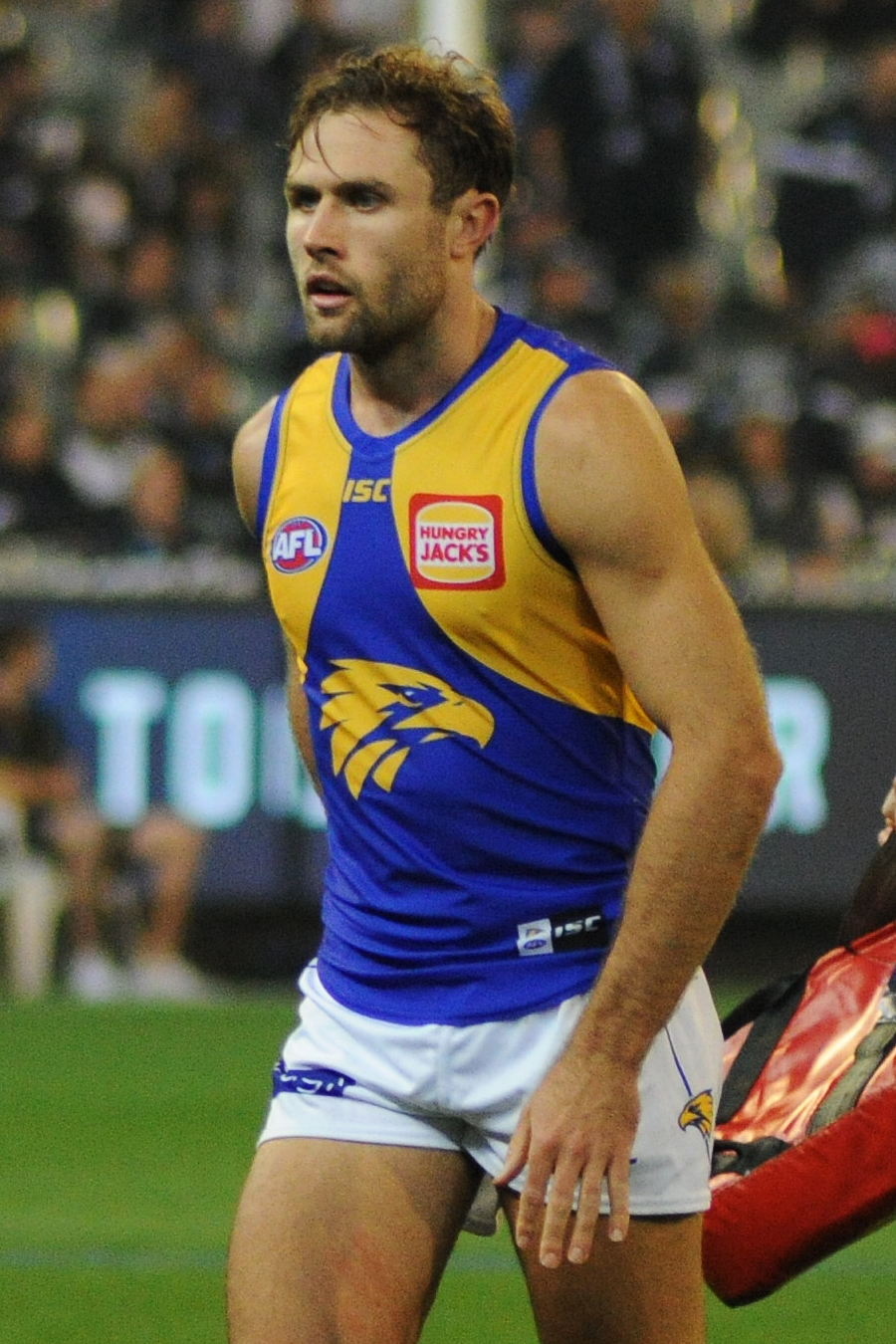
- Hutchings playing for West Coast in April 2018

Personal information
- Full name: Mark Raymond Hutchings
- Born: 25 May 1991 (age 35)
- Original teams: Ballajura JFC; Coolbinia JFC
- Draft: 20th pick, 2010 Rookie Draft (StK); 60th pick, 2012 National Draft (WC)
- Height: 183 cm (6 ft 0 in)
- Weight: 83 kg (183 lb)
- Position: Midfielder

Playing career^{1}
Years	Club	Games (Goals)
2010	St Kilda	0 (0)
2013–2021	West Coast	120 (46)

Representative team honours^{2}
Years	Team	Games (Goals)
2012	Western Australia	1 (0)
- ^{1} Playing statistics correct to the end of 2021.^{2} Representative statistics correct as of 2012.

Career highlights
- AFL premiership player: 2018; Western Australia under-18 captain 2009; West Perth best and fairest 2012; Runner-up Sandover Medal 2012; WAFL Premiership Player: 2013; Simpson Medal 2013 (grand final)

Mark Raymond Hutchings (born 25 May 1991) is a former Australian rules footballer who played nine seasons for the West Coast Eagles in the Australian Football League (AFL) between 2013 and 2021. He was selected by St Kilda in the 2010 Rookie Draft, but was delisted after a season at the club without having made his senior debut. After playing for West Perth in the West Australian Football League (WAFL), he was drafted by West Coast in the 2012 National Draft, and made his senior AFL debut during the 2013 season. In 2018, he was a member of West Coast's AFL premiership-winning team.

== Junior career ==
Hutchings graduated from Warwick Senior High School in Perth in 2008 and was part of the school's renowned Specialist Australian Rules Football Program. He played junior football for the Ballajura Junior Football Club and Coolbinia Junior Football Club's, and later represented Western Australia at the 2007 National Under-16 Championships. Zoned to the East Perth Football Club, where he played in the colts (under-18) and reserves divisions of the West Australian Football League (WAFL), Hutchings made his senior debut for East Perth in early August 2008, recording 21 disposals against Peel Thunder in what The West Australian described as a "spectacular debut". He went on to play in each of the club's five remaining matches, and the following season played in the club's first seven matches, before being named in Western Australia's team for the 2009 National Under-18 Championships. Hutchings was named as captain of the team that went on to win the championships, and was best on ground in the game against the Northern Territory. Although he was not named in the under-18 All-Australian team, he was one of 75 (and 13 WA-based) players invited to the AFL draft camp, where he went on to finish equal third in the beep test, with a score of 14.12.

== Senior career ==
Overlooked at the 2009 National Draft in November 2009, Hutchings was selected by the St Kilda Football Club with the 20th pick in the following month's Rookie Draft. However, he was de-listed by St Kilda at the end of the 2010 season, without playing a senior match for the club. He had spent most of the season playing for Sandringham Football Club, St Kilda's VFL-affiliate, playing twelve games and kicking three goals. Returning to Western Australia, Hutchings was recruited by the West Perth Football Club. He made his senior debut for the team in the second round of the 2011 season, and was outstanding early in the season—West Perth was undefeated in its first eight games, and Hutchings was the leader of The West Australian Footballer of the Year competition after nine rounds. He went on to be named in Western Australia's initial 31-man squad for the 2011 state game against Queensland, but did not make the final team after suffering a hamstring injury against Peel. Hutchings finished the season with 21 games for West Perth, and polled 21 votes to finish fourteenth in the Sandover Medal.

Following on from his form for West Perth, Hutchings nominated for the 2011 AFL draft, but was again overlooked, despite having excelled at both WAFL- and AFL-run draft combines. Further good form during the 2012 season led to Hutchings' selection in the state team to play against South Australia, where he was the youngest player in the side. He played another 20 games for West Perth during the season, and was awarded the Breckler Medal as the club's best and fairest player. In the Sandover Medal, he polled 51 votes to finish second behind Claremont's Kane Mitchell, the highest number of votes ever polled by a West Perth player. In the 2012 National Draft, Hutchings was selected by the West Coast Eagles with the 60th pick overall. Beginning the 2013 season with West Perth, after several 25-plus-disposal games, he was named to make his senior debut against the Brisbane Lions, and recorded 15 disposals on debut. Hutchings played most of the remainder of the season for West Coast, filling a midfield role after a run of injuries to other players, with a high of 26 disposals against the Western Bulldogs. Against Fremantle, he recorded 16 tackles, which was both a club record and an overall season record, as well as the equal third-highest tackle count since the statistic was first recorded in 1987. At the conclusion of West Coast's AFL season Hutchings returned to West Perth to play in the WAFL Finals. West Perth went on to win the Grand Final by 49 points, and Hutchings was awarded the Simpson Medal for best afield with 29 disposals and 3 goals.

After his debut season Hutchings continued to be a regular part of the senior team, and was part of the 2015 Grand Final team that lost to Hawthorn. Over the course of his career, Hutchings was tasked with tagging roles more and more regularly, and by 2018 he was considered one of the best taggers in the competition. His most notable performance was in the 2018 Grand Final, when he kept Steele Sidebottom to 14 disposals after he had 41 disposals in the preliminary final the week prior, as well as having 15 disposals and kicking a goal himself. West Coast won the game by five points making Hutchings a premiership player. In Round 5 2019, Hutchings played his 100th game for West Coast.

== Statistics ==
Legend
G	Goals	K	Kicks	D	Disposals	T	Tackles
B	Behinds	H	Handballs	M	Marks
#	Played in that season's premiership team

Season	Team	No.	Games	Totals							Averages (per game)							Votes
Season	Team	No.	Games	G	B	K	H	D	M	T	G	B	K	H	D	M	T	Votes
2013	West Coast	34	9	1	3	102	84	186	34	60	0.1	0.3	11.3	9.3	20.7	3.8	6.7	0
2014	West Coast	34	16	8	7	161	126	287	46	88	0.5	0.4	10.1	7.9	17.9	2.9	5.5	0
2015	West Coast	34	13	7	1	109	121	230	36	57	0.5	0.1	8.4	9.3	17.7	2.8	4.4	0
2016	West Coast	34	18	13	3	155	133	288	49	86	0.7	0.2	8.6	7.4	16.0	2.7	4.8	2
2017	West Coast	34	19	7	3	129	114	243	52	60	0.4	0.2	6.8	6.0	12.8	2.7	3.2	0
2018^{#}	West Coast	34	20	9	5	212	130	342	69	87	0.5	0.3	10.6	6.5	17.1	3.5	4.4	0
2019	West Coast	34	10	1	3	81	46	127	28	32	0.1	0.3	8.1	4.6	12.7	2.8	3.2	0
2020 (Note: The 2020 season was played with 17 home-and-away matches per team (down from 22) and 16-minute quarters with time on (down from 20-minute quarters with time on) due to the impact of the COVID-19 pandemic.)	West Coast	34	3	0	0	15	9	24	35	4	0	0	5.0	3.0	8.0	1.67	1.33	0
2021	West Coast	34	4	0	0	23	15	38	9	8	0	0	5.75	3.75	9.5	2.25	2.0	0
Career			120	46	27	1036	817	1853	352	492	0.38	0.22	8.63	6.81	15.44	2.93	4.10	2

== Personal life ==
After retiring from the AFL, Hutchings moved into a career in real estate.

In September 2026, Hutchings' partner died of a cardiac arrest in hospital two days after giving birth to their daughter.

== See also ==
- List of West Coast Eagles players
