= David Pretty =

Australian rules footballer

Personal information
- Full name: David Pretty
- Born: 2 April 1951 (age 75)
- Original team: Wodonga Juniors
- Height: 178 cm (5 ft 10 in)
- Weight: 73 kg (161 lb)
- Position: Defender/Wingman

Playing career^{1}
Years	Club	Games (Goals)
1969–73	North Melbourne	58 (12)
- ^{1} Playing statistics correct to the end of 1973.

David Pretty (born 2 April 1951) is a former Australian rules footballer who played for North Melbourne in the Victorian Football League (VFL).

Recruited from Wodonga, Pretty spent five seasons at North Melbourne, either in defence or on the wing. He then joined the Perth Football Club and starred for them in the 1974 Grand Final, sharing the Simpson Medal with East Fremantle's Gary Gibellini, despite finishing on the losing team.
