= Brant Colledge =

Australian rules footballer (born 1994)

Personal information
- Full name: Brant Adrian Colledge
- Born: 25 October 1994 (age 32); Strassbourg, France
- Original team: Attadale JFC/Aquinas College
- Draft: 45th pick, 2012 National Draft
- Height: 192 cm (6 ft 4 in)
- Weight: 90 kg (198 lb)
- Position: Midfield

Playing career^{1}
Years	Club	Games (Goals)
2013–2016	West Coast	3 (0)
- ^{1} Playing statistics correct to the end of 2016.

Brant Adrian Colledge (born 25 October 1994) is a former professional Australian rules footballer who played for the West Coast Eagles in the Australian Football League (AFL). He was drafted by West Coast with the 45th pick in the 2012 National Draft, but played only three senior games for the club (two in 2014 and one in 2015) before being delisted at the end of the 2016 season.

== Early life ==
Colledge was born in France whilst his father, Steve, was coaching field hockey at Racing Club de France. His father had previously played for the Australian national field hockey team. Colledge began playing football for the Attadale Junior Football Club, and also played school football for Aquinas College. He played colts matches for Perth in the West Australian Football League (WAFL) during both the 2011 and 2012 seasons, and was in Western Australia's squad for both the 2011 and 2012 AFL Under 18 Championships.

== AFL career ==
Drafted by West Coast with pick 45 at the 2012 National Draft, Colledge made his senior WAFL debut in round 5 of the 2013 season, but managed only one further senior WAFL game (and six reserves games) after struggling with various injuries, including hip problems during the pre-season, a broken jaw, a hamstring injury, and finally a season-ending ankle injury. After playing the first two games of the 2014 WAFL season for West Coast's new reserves affiliate, East Perth, he made his senior debut for West Coast in round three of the 2014 AFL season, recording eight disposals and four tackles against St Kilda. He returned for the next game, against Geelong, but was then dropped and played only at WAFL level for the rest of the season.

During the 2015 AFL season, Colledge made only a single appearance at senior level, against Geelong in round nine. He was delisted at the end of the season, but was re-drafted in the 2016 Rookie Draft due to being contracted for 2016. Colledge was unable to break through to the senior line-up during the 2016 season, and was delisted once again.
