= Dennis Blair (footballer) =

Australian rules footballer (born 1951)

Personal information
- Full name: Dennis Robert Blair
- Born: 20 August 1951 (age 75)
- Original team: Subiaco
- Height: 187 cm (6 ft 2 in)
- Weight: 85 kg (187 lb)

Playing career^{1}
Years	Club	Games (Goals)
1976–78	Footscray	41 (9)
- ^{1} Playing statistics correct to the end of 1978.

Dennis Robert Blair (born 20 August 1951) is a former Australian rules footballer who played for Footscray in the Victorian Football League (VFL) during the 1970s.

Blair holds a place in the history of the Subiaco Football Club as a member of their drought-breaking 1973 premiership team and Simpson Medal winner for his performance at centre half back. He was picked up by Footscray later in the decade and spent three seasons in the VFL.

Dennis Blair has had a career as an eminent civil engineer in local government. His work at the city of Wanneroo spanned over thirty years and he is currently Director of Asset Services with the Shire of Kalamunda. Dennis is still an avid Western Bulldogs supporter. He is married to Jenny and is a grandfather.

== Bibliography ==
- Holmesby, Russell and Main, Jim (2007). The Encyclopedia of AFL Footballers. 7th ed. Melbourne: Bas Publishing.
