= Brent LeCras =

Australian rules footballer (born 1981)

Personal information
- Full name: Brent Phillip LeCras
- Born: 12 October 1981 (age 45)
- Original team: Cervantes (CMCFL)
- Draft: 56th overall (2003 National Draft, Kangaroos
- Height: 190 cm (6 ft 3 in)
- Weight: 93 kg (205 lb)

Playing career
Years	Club	Games (Goals)
2002–03, 2008–12	West Perth	141 (159)
2005–06	Kangaroos	6 (1)

Representative team honours
Years	Team	Games (Goals)
2008–12	Western Australia	4 (4)

Career highlights
- 2003 Simpson Medal (Grand Final); 2003 WAFL Premiership; 2009 Simpson Medal (State); 2009 West Perth Leading Goalkicker

Brent Phillip LeCras (born 12 October 1981) is a former Australian rules football player who played in the Australian Football League for the Kangaroos. He was originally recruited from Cervantes.

After being drafted in 2003, LeCras played six matches for the Kangaroos between 2005 and 2006.

He returned to play for West Perth Football Club in the West Australian Football League. In total, he played 141 games and kicked 138 goals for the Falcons since making his debut in 2002. He received the 2003 Simpson Medal for best-on-ground in the WAFL Grand Final, and the 2009 Simpson Medal for his performance in the WAFL state game against the SANFL. He was selected in the 2011 WAFL state squad. Le Cras played for the Port Adelaide Magpies in the South Australian National Football League in 2007, and was the club's leading goal kicker for the season. He retired in 2012.

He is the brother of former West Coast Eagles player Mark LeCras. Their father, Peter LeCras, played for East Fremantle in the WAFL.
