= Simpson Medal =

Australian rules football medal

The Simpson Medal is an individual prize awarded for Australian rules football in Western Australia. The medal has been donated by Dr Fred Simpson and family since 1945.

Simpson Medals are currently awarded to the following players:

- The best player on the ground in the West Australian Football League Grand Final (awarded annually since 1945), and
- the best Western Australian player on the ground in any interstate representative match contested by a West Australian Football League composite team (awarded annually since 1994).

Simpson Medals have also been awarded under other criteria in interstate football throughout history:

- To the best player on the ground from either team in any stand-alone interstate representative match played in Western Australia from 1948 until 1993, including State of Origin matches from 1977 until 1993 (this did not include National Carnival matches),
- to the best Western Australian player across a tournament of interstate representative matches involving Western Australia (this included National Carnivals from 1950 until 1979, the 1988 Bicentennial Carnival, and Western Australia's 1964 interstate tour), and
- to the best player on the ground in club exhibition matches between a Western Australian club and an interstate club (in 1946 and 1947 only).

After 1994, the interstate Simpson Medal was strictly awarded for WAFL representative matches, not for the AFL representative State of Origin matches which were played in the late 1990s; a separate medal—the Graham Moss Medal—was awarded to Western Australia's best player in those matches.

== Simpson Medal Winners ==
=== WAFL Grand Final ===
Table key
^	Player was member of losing team

Table of recipients
Year	Recipient	Club
1945	Alan Ebbs	East Fremantle
1946	John Loughridge^	West Perth
1947	Eric Eriksson	South Fremantle
1948	Dave Ingraham	South Fremantle
1949	Jack Larcombe	West Perth
1950	Clive Lewington	South Fremantle
1951	Don Porter	West Perth
1952	Des Kelly	South Fremantle
1953	Steve Marsh	South Fremantle
1954	Charlie Tyson	South Fremantle
1955	Merv McIntosh	Perth
1956	Tony Parentich^	South Fremantle
1957	Frank Conway	East Fremantle
1958	Ned Bull	East Perth
1959	Graham Farmer	East Perth
1960	Brian Foley	West Perth
1961	Keith Slater	Swan Districts
1962	Ray Sorrell^	East Fremantle
1963	Ken Bagley	Swan Districts
1964	Norm Rogers^	East Fremantle
1965	Dave Imrie	East Fremantle
1966	Barry Cable	Perth
1967	Barry Cable	Perth
1968	Barry Cable	Perth
1969	Bill Dempsey	West Perth
1970	Brian Ciccotosto	South Fremantle
1971	Shane Sheridan	West Perth
1972	Ken McAullay	East Perth
1973	Dennis Blair	Subiaco
1974	Gary Gibellini	East Fremantle
1974	David Pretty^	Perth
1975	Mel Whinnen	West Perth
1976	Mal Day	Perth
1977	Wim Rosbender	Perth
1978	Ian Miller	East Perth
1979	Kevin Taylor	East Fremantle
1980	Maurice Rioli	South Fremantle
1981	Gary Shaw	Claremont
1981	Maurice Rioli^	South Fremantle
1982	Graham Melrose	Swan Districts
1983	Brad Shine	Swan Districts
1984	Barry Kimberley	Swan Districts
1985	Brian Taylor	Subiaco
1986	Mark Zanotti	Subiaco
1987	Peter Thorne	Claremont
1988	Mick Lee	Subiaco
1989	Ben Allan	Claremont
1990	Greg Walker	Swan Districts
1991	Dale Kickett	Claremont
1992	Clinton Browning	East Fremantle
1993	Dale Kickett	Claremont
1994	Mark Amaranti	East Fremantle
1995	Darren Harris	West Perth
1996	Todd Ridley	Claremont
1997	David Hynes	South Fremantle
1998	Adrian Bromage	East Fremantle
1999	Christian Kelly	West Perth
2000	Dean Cox	East Perth
2001	Ryan Turnbull	East Perth
2002	Ryan Turnbull	East Perth
2003	Brent LeCras	West Perth
2004	Paul Vines	Subiaco
2005	Toby McGrath	South Fremantle
2006	Marc Webb	Subiaco
2007	Brad Smith	Subiaco
2008	Chris Hall	Subiaco
2009	Ashton Hams	South Fremantle
2010	Andrew Krakouer	Swan Districts
2011	Beau Wilkes	Claremont
2012	Paul Medhurst	Claremont
2013	Mark Hutchings	West Perth
2014	Jason Bristow	Subiaco
2015	Matt Boland	Subiaco
2016	Connor Blakely	Peel Thunder
2017	Luke Ryan	Peel Thunder
2018	Kyal Horsley	Subiaco
2019	Ben Sokol	Subiaco
2020	Jye Bolton	Claremont
2021	Greg Clark	Subiaco
2022	Luke Meadows	West Perth
2023	Milan Murdock	East Fremantle
2024	Neil Erasmus	Peel Thunder
2025	Hamish Free	South Fremantle
2026	Jeremy Sharp	Peel Thunder

=== Interstate/State of Origin ===
Year	Player	Team	Match
2025	Milan Murdock	WA	WA vs SA
2024	Milan Murdock	WA	WA vs SA
2023	Angus Schumacher	WA	WA vs SA
2022	Leigh Kitchin	WA	WA vs SA
2021	Jye Bolton	WA	WA vs SA
2019	Josh Deluca	WA	WA vs SA
2018	Jye Bolton	WA	WA vs SA
2017	Ben Saunders	WA	WA vs Vic
2016	Jye Bolton	WA	WA vs TAS
2015	Ryan Davis	WA	WA vs SA
2014	Ashton Hams	WA	WA vs NEAFL
2013	Wayde Twomey	WA	WA vs VFL
2012	Paul Johnson	WA	WA vs SA
2011	Josh Smith	WA	WA vs Qld
2010	Luke Blackwell	WA	WA v VIC
2009	Brent LeCras	WA	WA v SA
2008	Ian Richardson	WA	WA v QLD
2007	Adam Hay	WA	WA v VFL
2006	Caine Hayes	WA	WA v SA
2005	Matthew Priddis	WA	WA v QLD
2004	Chris Bossong	WA	WA v VFL
2003	Luke Webster	WA	WA v SA
2002	Cory Johnson	WA	WA v QLD
2000	Brad Campbell	WA	WA v SA
1999	Rod Tregenza	WA	WA v TAS
1998	Dean Irving	WA	WA v SA
1997	Jon Dorotich	WA	WA v TAS
1996	David Snow	WA	WA v SA
1995	Craig Treleven	WA	WA v QLD
1994	Paul Symmons	WA	WA v SA
1993	Marty Atkins	WA	WA v SA
1991	Brendon Retzlaff	WA	WA v SA
1991	Paul Harding	WA	WA v VIC - State of Origin
1990	Ben Allan	WA	WA v SA
1990	Simon Madden	VIC	WA v VIC - State of Origin
1989	Jason Dunstall	VIC	WA v VIC - State of Origin
1988	Gerard Healy	VIC	WA v VIC - State of Origin
1988	Peter Thorne	WA	WA v VFA
1988	Ben Allan	WA	WA v SA
1988	Dwayne Lamb	WA	Adelaide Carnival - State of Origin
1987	Andrew Bews	VIC	WA v VIC - State of Origin
1987	Chris McDermott	SA	WA v SA
1986	Brad Hardie	WA	WA v VIC - State of Origin
1985	Dale Weightman	VIC	WA v VIC - State of Origin
1985	Craig Bradley	SA	WA v SA
1984	Brad Hardie	WA	WA v VIC - State of Origin
1983	Maurice Rioli	WA	WA v VIC - State of Origin
1983	Stephen Michael	WA	WA v SA
1982	Kevin Taylor	WA	WA v SA
1982	Mark Browning	VIC	WA v VIC - State of Origin
1981 (tie)	Jim Krakouer	WA	WA v SA
1981 (tie)	Gary Buckenara	WA	WA v SA
1981	Simon Beasley	WA	WA v VIC - State of Origin
1979	Graham Cornes	SA	WA v SA
1978	Peter Knights	VIC	WA v VIC - State of Origin
1977	Barry Cable	WA	WA v VIC - State of Origin*
1977	Max James	SA	WA v SA
1977	Graham Moss	WA	WA v VIC
1976	Glenn Elliott	VIC	WA v VIC
1975	Stan Magro	WA	WA v VIC
1974	Ron Alexander	WA	WA v VIC
1973	Peter Featherby	WA	WA v SA
1972	Ken McAullay	WA	Perth Carnival
1971	Peter Knights	VIC	WA v VIC
1970	Alan Stiles	WA	WA v SA
1969	Graham Farmer	WA	Adelaide Carnival
1969	Barry Cable	WA	Adelaide Carnival
1968	John Nicholls	VIC	WA v VIC
1967	Bill Walker	WA	WA v SA
1966	John McIntosh	WA	Hobart Carnival
1965	Bob Spargo	WA	WA v VIC
1965	Kevin Murray	WA	WA v VFA
1964	Bob Shearman	SA	WA v SA
1964	Derek Chadwick	WA	WA interstate tour
1963	Brian Sarre	WA	WA v VIC
1962	Roy Harper	WA	WA v SA
1962	Ray Sorrell	WA	WA v TAS
1961	Ray Gabelich	WA	Brisbane Carnival
1960	Allen Aylett	VIC	WA v VIC
1959	John Watts	WA	WA v SA
1958	Graham Farmer	WA	WA v VIC
1957	Ted Whitten	VIC	WA v VIC
1956	Fred Goldsmith	VIC	WA v VIC
1956	Graham Farmer	WA	WA v SA
1955	Fos Williams	SA	WA v SA
1954	Keith Harper	WA	WA v VIC
1953	Merv McIntosh	WA	Adelaide Carnival
1952	Merv McIntosh	WA	WA v SA
1951	Fred Buttsworth	WA	WA v VIC
1950	Gordon Maffina	WA	Brisbane Carnival
1949	Stan Heal	WA	WA v SA
1948	Kevin Curran	VIC	WA v VIC
1947	Frank Jenkins	South Fremantle	South Fremantle v Essendon
1946	Lou Richards	Collingwood	East Fremantle v Collingwood

* Cable's 1977 Simpson Medal was retrospectively awarded in 2007.afl.com.au wafl.com.au
