= Ashton Hams =

Australian rules footballer

Personal information
- Full name: Ashton Kane Hams
- Born: 6 September 1986 (age 40); Katanning, Western Australia
- Original team: Busselton Football Club
- Draft: No. 40, 2010 rookie draft
- Height: 174 cm (5 ft 9 in)
- Weight: 77 kg (170 lb)
- Position: Forward

Playing career^{1}
Years	Club	Games (Goals)
2010–2013	West Coast	39 (41)
- ^{1} Playing statistics correct to the end of 2013.

Career highlights
- WAFL premiership player: 2009; Simpson Medal: 2009

Ashton Kane Hams (born 6 September 1986) is an Australian rules footballer who played for the West Coast Eagles in the Australian Football League (AFL). He was recruited from the South Fremantle Football Club in the West Australian Football League (WAFL), and played 39 games for West Coast from 2010 to 2013 as a small forward.

== Football career ==
Born in Katanning, family moved in 2001 to Busselton, Hams made his senior football debut for South Fremantle in the West Australian Football League (WAFL) towards the end of the 2004 season. He has since played in 88 games, including two grand final victories in 2005 and 2009. In 2009, he was awarded the Simpson Medal for being the best player in the Grand Final.

He was drafted by West Coast with the 40th (third round) of the 2010 AFL Rookie Draft, and was elevated from the rookie list to make his debut against Essendon in Round 4, 2010. He was able to be elevated when Tim Houlihan was placed on the long-term injury list due to a foot injury. He played 39 for West Coast over four seasons, but quit playing in the AFL when West Coast became aligned with East Perth in the WAFL. Hams knew that he would often be playing in the WAFL and didn't want to play for any club other than South Fremantle.

He is the twin brother of Kyle Hams, who played alongside Ashton at WAFL club South Fremantle, before moving to Swan Districts between 2011 and 2013.

In August 2018, Hams played his 200th game for South Fremantle.

He played his final game in September 2018 when South Fremantle lost the Preliminary final to West Perth.
