= Murray Bushrangers =

Names
- Full name: Murray Bushrangers Football Club
- Nickname: Bushrangers

2026 season
- After finals: 17th
- Home-and-away season: 17th of 19
- Leading goalkicker: Jethro Snelling (20)
- Best and fairest: Jackson Hewitt

Club details
- Founded: 1993; 33 years ago
- Colours: Black Indigo Gold
- Competition: Talent League
- Coach: Justin McMahon
- Premierships: Talent League (2) 1998, 2008
- Grounds: Norm Minns Oval, Wangaratta
- Deakin Reserve, Shepparton
- Lavington Sports Ground, Albury; Martin Park, Wodonga

Other information
- Official website: MBFC website

The Murray Bushrangers is an Australian rules football team playing in Victorian statewide under-18s competition, presently known as the Talent League, since 1993 based in Wangaratta. The team trains on Norm Minns Oval, Wangaratta.

The Under 18's boys team has been coached by Mark Brown from 2019 to 2024. The guernsey colours are Black, Purple and Gold, with black socks and black (home) or white (away) shorts.

The Bushrangers have produced some of the elite Australian Football League players through the AFL draft including Daniel Cross, Brett Deledio, Steele Sidebottom, Steve Johnson, Jarrad Waite, Kayne Pettifer, Justin Koschitzke, Hamish McIntosh, Barry Hall, Fraser Gehrig, Ben Mathews, Steven King, Robert Campbell, Alipate Carlile, David Mundy, Shannon Byrnes & Laitham Vandermeer in recent years.

== Club history ==
The TAC Cup was established in 1992 following the disbandment of the VFL Under 19's competition, due to the ceasing of the Victorian state geographical zoning regions and was initially ran by the Victorian State Football League.

The Murray Bushrangers are based at Wangaratta, near the Victoria-NSW border and have been involved in the competition since 1993 when the competition added another four country teams, which brought the number of teams to twelve regions. The club's original home ground was at the W J Findlay Oval, Wangaratta between 1993 and 2011, before they moved into the new Wangaratta Sports Development Centre on the Norm Minns Oval at the Wangaratta Showgrounds in 2012.

The Murray Bushrangers supports local talent squads at Under 15 and Under 16 levels and co-ordinates the talented player pathways program for young aspiring AFL players throughout the North East and Goulburn Valley regions.

While the Murray Bushrangers provides a pathway to the AFL for some players, for others it provides experience in elite under-18 football and a pathway to playing or coaching at regional level.

Following season 1999, the AFL Reserves Grade was terminated leaving AFL clubs without a place to field their reserves players. The Kangaroos, together with the Ovens and Murray Football League launched their own stand-alone VFL club in the Victorian Football League called the Murray Kangaroos Football Club. The club's home games were split between Coburg City Oval in Melbourne, and Lavington Oval in Albury-Wodonga.

The side was made up with players from the Kangaroos, topped up with players from the Ovens and Murray Football League, and offering a second chance to players from the statewide under-18s Murray Bushrangers team who had missed out on the draft.

At the end of 2002, The Murray Kangaroos disbanded the club citing pressure from the AFL, and cost-cutting measures (the club cost around $100,000 a year to field). North Melbourne instead decided to align with the Port Melbourne Football Club in a short-term deal.

Murray lost in the 2007 TAC Cup Grand Final to the Calder Cannons by 50 points and Ben McEvoy was selected in the TAC Team of the Year. 2008 saw the Bushrangers dominate the entire competition season finishing 1st at season end and defeating the Dandenong Stingrays by 81 points in the 2008 grand final and midfielder-forward Steele Sidebottom had a game-high 32 possessions and kicked 10.3 claiming best on ground honours.

The club has had three players who have won the League's best and fairest award, the Morrish Medal, Derek Murray (1997), Farran Priest (2008) and Clayton Oliver (2015). Interestingly, back in 1959, former Wangaratta Football Club player, Dom Glassenbury won the Morrish Medal when playing for Fitzroy Football Club Under 19's. as of 2024, Glassenbury still resides in Wangaratta.

== Grand Finals ==
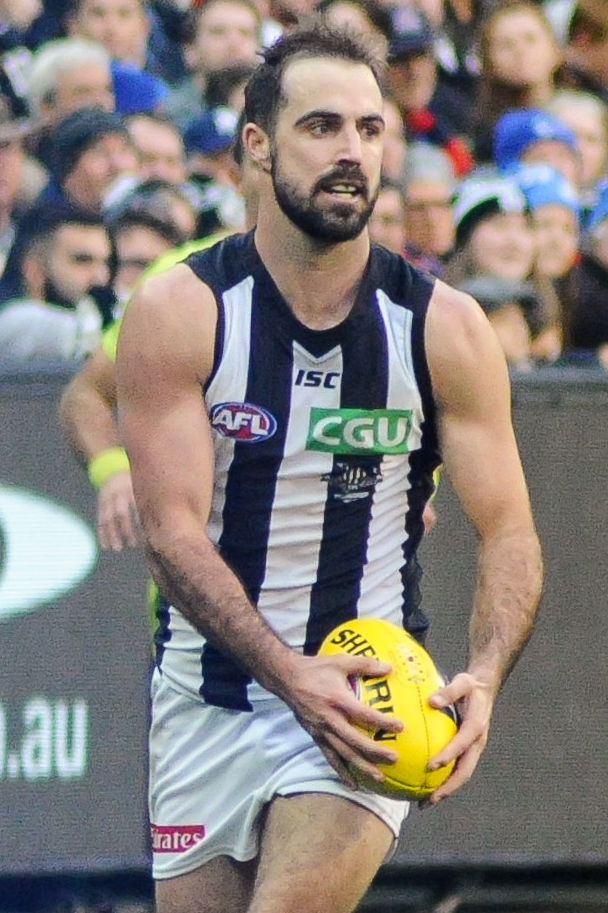
Steele Sidebottom: Collingwood FC

Under 18's Boys

| Year | Premiers | Score | Runner Up | Score | Venue | Best on Ground |
|---|---|---|---|---|---|---|
| 1998 | Murray Bushrangers | 17.18 - 120 | Geelong Falcons | 12.12 - 84 | Melbourne Cricket Ground | Michael Stevens |
| 2003 | Calder Cannons | 16.14 - 110 | Murray Bushrangers | 2.6 - 18 | Melbourne Cricket Ground | Brock McLean |
| 2007 | Calder Cannons | 14.20 - 104 | Murray Bushrangers | 7.12 - 54 | Melbourne Cricket Ground | Ashley Arrowsmith |
| 2008 | Murray Bushrangers | 21.16 - 142 | Dandenong Stingrays | 9.7 - 61 | Docklands Stadium/Etihad Stadium | Steele Sidebottom |
| 2016 | Sandringham Dragons | 12.13 - 85 | Murray Bushrangers | 9.14 - 68 | Docklands Stadium/Etihad Stadium | Andrew McGrath |

Under 18's Girls

2017 - Murray Bushrangers finished 2nd on the ladder.

== Statistical Record ==
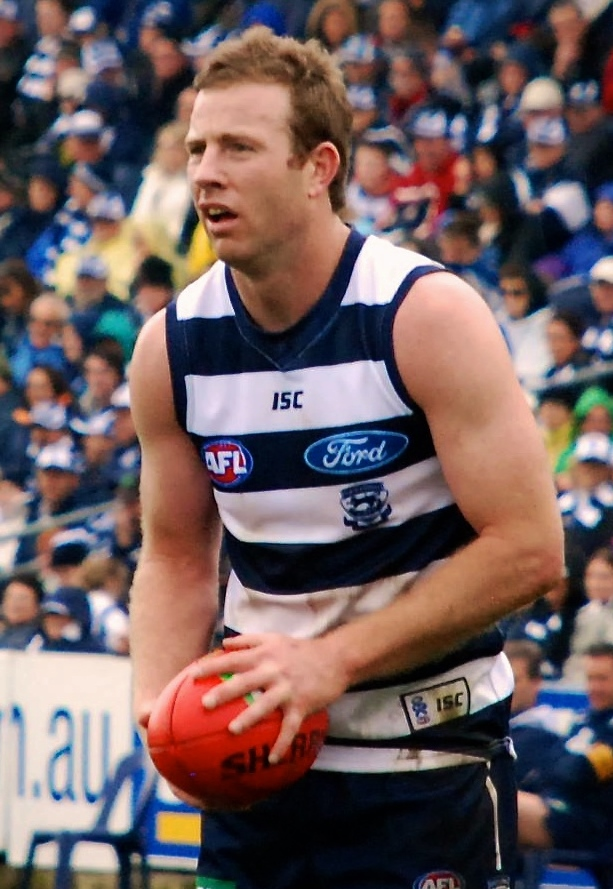
Steve Johnson: Geelong FC

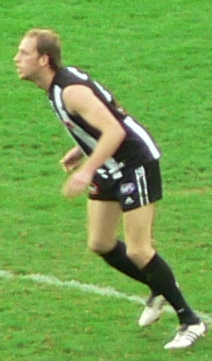
Josh Fraser: Collingwood FC

- TAC Cup / Club Stats
  - Premierships (2): 1998, 2008
  - Runners-up (3): 2003, 2007, 2016
  - Minor Premiers (4): 1999, 2000, 2001, 2008
  - Wooden Spoons: Nil. (lowest: 13th of 18 in 2023)
  - Grand Final Best On Ground Medalist: Michael Stevens (1998), Steele Sidebottom (2008)
  - Most goals in a grand final: 10 - Steele Sidebottom (2008)
  - Morrish Medalist: Derek Murray (1997), Farran Priest (2008) Clayton Oliver (2015)
  - Leading U/18 Goalkicker: Josh Schache 34 (2015), Joshua Murphy 30 (2024),
  - No.1 Draft Pick (Allen Aylett Medal): Josh Fraser (2000), Brett Deledio (2004)
  - MB Games Record Holder: Derek Murray (48 games)
  - MB Goals Record Holer: Adam Prior (85 Goals)
  - MB Most goals in a season:
  - MB Most goals in game: 8 - Daniel Johnson: 2017. Others ?
  - TAC CUP Coach of the Year award winners: Nil
  - Highest Score: MB: 28.12 - 180 d Sandringham Dragons: 8.7 - 55. Rd.8, 2003
  - Lowest Score: Calder Cannons: 16.14 - 110 d MB: 2.6 - 18. Grand Final, 2003
  - Most consecutive wins: 15 from Rd.9 2008 to Rd.1 2009. (no available records between 1994 & 1999)
  - Longest serving coach: Kelly O'Donnell: 1994 - 2000 (seven seasons)
  AFL Stats (by former MBFC players)
  - AFL Coaches Association Award - Champion Player: Barry Hall (2005), Clayton Oliver (2021 & 2022)
  - AFL Grand Final. Norm Smith Medalist: Steve Johnson: Geelong (2007)
  - Anzac Day Match Medal: Mark McGough: Collingwood (2002), Steele Sidebottom Collingwood (2016)
  - Robert Rose Medal: David Teague (2004)
  - Leading AFL Goalkicker: Coleman Medal: Fraser Gehrig 2004 & 2005
  - AFL Mark of the Year: Michael Newton: (2007), Jamie Elliott: Collingwood (2013)
  - AFL Best First Year Player: Brett Deledio Richmond (2005)
  - AFL Rising Star Award: (Ron Evans Medal) Brett Deledio Richmond (2005)
  - Most All Australian Side Selections: 4 - Barry Hall
  - Most Goals: 549 - Fraser Gehrig: West Coast & St Kilda
  - Most Games: 376 - David Mundy: Fremantle
  - Most Consecutive AFL games: 280 - Jack Crisp: Collingwood (2015 to 2026)
  - Former MBFC player to be a senior AFL coach: Adem Yze: Richmond (2023-26), Steven King (2026-27)

Yearly Ladder Placings (1993 - 2025)

| **Year** | **93** | **94** | **95** | **96** | **97** | **98** | **99** | **00** | **01** | **02** | **03** | **04** | **05** | **06** | **07** | **08** | **09** | **10** | **11** | **12** | **13** | **14** | **15** | **16** | **17** | **18** | **19** | **20** | **21** | **22** | **23** | **24** | **25** | **26** | **27** |
| Position | 8th | 6th | 6th | 10th | 2nd | **1st** | 1st* | 1st* | 1st* | 2nd | 2nd | 9th | 8th | 9th | 2nd | **1st*** | 10th | 8th | 11th | 5th | 8th | 8th | 3rd | 2nd | 5th | 5th | 9th | N/A | 12th | 9th | 13th | 7th | 16th | 17th | |

- 1st*: Minor premiers
- 1st: Bold - Major premiers

== MBFC / AFL Draft Selections ==
The following 165 former Murray Bushranger footballers were drafted / traded to an AFL club, with 125 (77%) of these players going onto to play senior AFL football (in bold). 41 drafted players have not played senior AFL football as of the 25th July 2024.

- "BR": B. Rookie; "MSRD": - Mid season rookie draft; "P": Pre-Season Draft; "PSSS": Pre season supplemental selection; "R": Rookie Draft; "T": - Trade; "Z": - Zone.

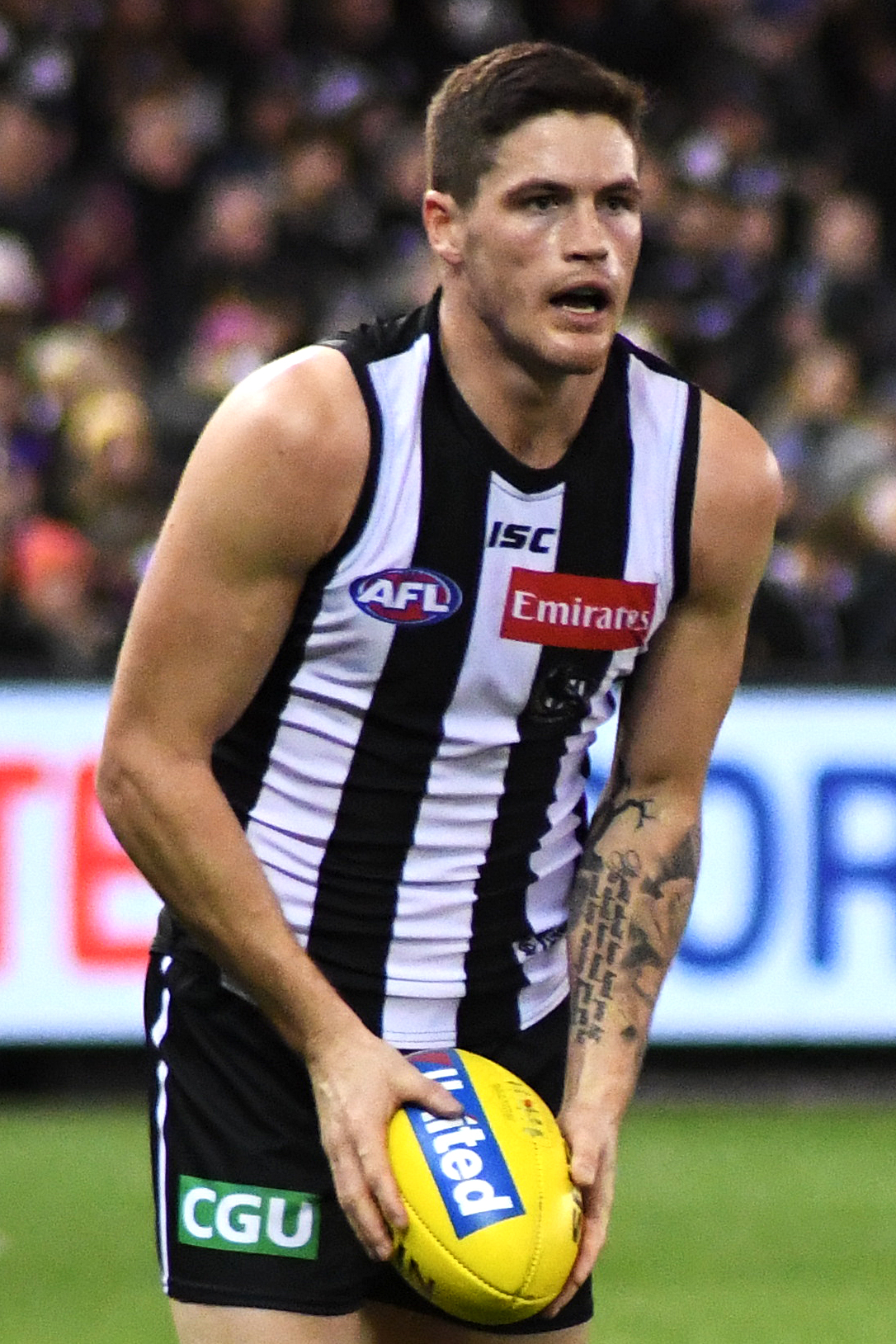
Jack Crisp: Collingwood FC

| Year | Draft No's | Murray Bushrangers FC - Player's Name |
|---|---|---|
| 1993 | 2 | Fraser Gehrig: No.5, Paul Lewis: No.30 |
| 1994 | 5 | Joel Smith: No.5, Shane Sikora: No.12, Adem Yze: No.16, Shaun Gordon No. 86, Steven King: P. |
| 1995 | 6 | Luke Trew: No.14, Barry Hall: No.19, Andrew Lamb: No.36, Leigh Marshall: Z, Ben Mathews: Z, Adam Houlihan: P. |
| 1996 | 4 | Rory Hilton: No.3, Hayden Lamaro: No.30, Ben Parker: No.86, Nathan Tresize: No.14R. |
| 1997 | 7 | Joel McKay: No.15, Brad Stephens: No.27, Joshua Robertson: No.46, Leigh Newton: No.3P, Brad Campbell: No.15P, Adam Coghlan: No.3P, Heath Younie: No.59R |
| 1998 | 6 | Michael Stevens: No.5, Murray Vance: No.6, Chris Lamb: No.13, Aaron Henneman: No.25, Derek Murray: No.54, Ricky Symes: No.61. |
| 1999 | 7 | Josh Fraser: No.1, Adam Butler: No.46, Andrew Mills: No.52, Robert Forster-Knight: No.72, Ryan Houlihan: No.73, Matthew Shir: No.83, Adam Mathews: No.92. |
| 2000 | 12 | Justin Koschitzke: No.2, Kayne Pettifer: No.9, Blake Campbell: No.31, Allan Murray: No.35, Chris Hyde: No.40, Sean O'Keeffe: No.46, Daniel Cross: No.56, Luke Hammond: No.59, Marc Bullen: No.63, Robert Campbell: No.27R, Craig Ednie: No.52R, David Teague: No.57R. |
| 2001 | 7 | Steve Johnson: No.24, Mark Powell: No.28, Simon O'Keefe: No.34, Justin Davies: No.39, Mark McGough: No.43, Jarrad Waite: No.46, Josh Houlihan: No.49 |
| 2002 | 4 | Hamish McIntosh: No.9, Luke Mullins: No.7P, Jonathon McCormick: No.1R, Shannon Byrnes: No.40R. |
| 2003 | 5 | Kane Tenace: No.3, Ryley Dunn: No.10, David Mundy: No.19, Ben Cosgriff: No.11R, Luke Taylor: No.59R. |
| 2004 | 3 | Brett Deledio: No.1, Chris Egan: No.10, Michael Newton: No.43. |
| 2005 | 3 | Marcus Drum: No.10, Beau Muston: No.22, Alipate Carlile: No.44 |
| 2006 | 3 | Ben Reid: No.8, Tim Looby: No.40R, Adam Prior: No.61R, Sam Rowe: No.62R |
| 2007 | 5 | Ben McEvoy: No.9, Dawson Simpson: No.34, Daniel Boyle: No.31R, Dean Terlich: No.61R, Jarrod Harbrow: No.27R |
| 2008 | 4 | Jack Ziebell: No.9, Steele Sidebottom: No.11, Sam Wright: No.27, Caleb Tiller: No.80. |
| 2009 | 8 | Sam Reid: No.38, Brayden Norris: No.53, Taylor Duryea: No.69, Andrew Browne: No.94, Tom Rockliff: No.5P, Jamason Daniels: No.14R, Kayde Klemke: No.50R, Dylan McNeil: No.75R. |
| 2010 | 5 | Shaun Atley: No.17, Josh Mellington: No.56, Jonathon Ceglar: T, Sam Schulz: Z, Mark Whiley: Z. |
| 2011 | 6 | Patrick Wearden: No.47, Lachlan Smith: No.17R, Jack Crisp: No.40R, Jamie Elliott: T, Tim Segrave: Z, Anthony Miles: Z. |
| 2012 | 7 | Tom Clurey: No.29, Josh Prudden: No.50, Dean Terlich: No.68, Jack Crisp: No.86, Matt Taberner: No.11R, Cadeyn Williams: No.40R, Zac Williams: No.54R. |
| 2013 | 4 | Jarman Impey: No.21, Nick Holman: No.51, Matt Taberner: No.70, Zac Williams: No.95, |
| 2014 | 7 | Caleb Marchbank: No.6, Daniel Howe: No.31, Nathan Drummond: No.52, Dougal Howard: No.56, Sam Schulz: No.1R, Max King: No.19R, Kayne Turner: No.25R. |
| 2015 | 5 | Josh Schache: No.2, Clayton Oliver: No.4, Mitch King: No.42, Nicholas Couglan: No.23R, Kyle Galloway: No.59R |
| 2016 | 11 | Will Brodie: No.9, Jy Simpkin: No.12, Todd Marshall: No.16, Esava Ratugolea: No.43, Lachie Tiziani: No.54, Ryan Garthwaite: No.72, Harry Morrison: No.74, James Cousins: No.46R, Max Lynch: No.51R, Alex Keath: No.58R, Zach Sproule: BR |
| 2017 | 6 | Charlie Spargo: No.29, Ben Paton: No.46, Harry Jones: No.7R, Doulton Langlands: No.8R, Nick Holman: No.19R, Josh Prudden: No.35R |
| 2018 | 7 | Ely Smith: No.21, Laitham Vandermeer: No.37, Jacob Koschitzke: No.52, Mathew Walker: No.63, Finbar O'Dwyer: No.66, Jordon Butts: No.39R, Michael Gibbons: PSSS |
| 2019 | 2 | Lachlan Ash: No.4, Alex Keath: No.23T. |
| 2020 | 3 | Elijah Hollands: No.7, Dominic Bedendo: No.55, Nick Murray: PSSS. |
| 2021 | 5 | Josh Rachele: No.6, Tom Brown: No.17, Patrick Parnell: No.4MSRD, Sam Durham: No.9MSRD, Daniel Turner: No.24MSRD. |
| 2022 | 6 | Oliver Hollands: No.11, Brayden George: No.26, Caleb Mitchell: No.40, Joe Richards: No.48, Daniel Howe: No.33R, Kayne Turner: No.39R |
| 2023 | 5 | Connor O'Sullivan: No.11, Phoenix Gothard: No.12, Darcy Wilson: No.18, Oscar Ryan: No.27, Shaun Mannagh: No.36. |
| 2024 | 6 | Toby Murray: No.7MSRD, Joe Berry: No.15, Matt Whitlock: No.27, Jack Whitlock: No.33, Riley Bice: No.41, Aidan Johnson: No.68. |
| 2025 | 1 | Ewan Mackinlay: No.11MSRD, Harry Dean: No.3, Riley Onley: No.2R, Liam Hetherton: Cat B |
| 2026 | 1 | Max Beattie: No.12MSRD, |
| **TOTAL** | (180) | |
| **Year** | **No's** | **Murray Bushrangers FC - Player's Name** |

== Team of the Year players ==
The following players were selected in the TAC Cup / NAB Cup / Coates Talent League Under 18 team of the year side.

| Year | Player's Name |
|---|---|
| 1993 | Fraser Gehrig |
| 1994 | Joel Smith |
| 1995 | Jason Sheather, Barry Hall |
| 1996 | Hayden Lamaro |
| 1997 | Matthew Hyde, Heath Younie, Derek Murray |
| 1998 | Chris Lamb, Derek Murray |
| 1999 | Craig Ednie, Josh Fraser, David Teague |
| 2000 | Craig Ednie, Justin Koschitzke, Sean O'Keeffe |
| 2001 | Mark McGough, Steve Johnson, Justin Davies |
| 2002 | Corey Brown, Hamish McIntosh |
| 2003 | Kane Tenace, Ryley Dunn, Lance Oswald |
| 2004 | Marcus Drum, Brett Deledio |
| 2005 | Tim Looby, Marcus Drum |
| 2006 | No player selected |
| 2007 | Ben McEvoy |
| 2008 | Jack Ziebell, Tom Rockliff, Kade Klemke |
| 2009 | Dylan McNeil |
| 2010 | Shaun Atley, Anthony Miles |
| 2011 | Jack Crisp |
| 2012 | Tom Clurey |
| 2013 | Michael Gibbons, Nick Holman |
| 2014 | Daniel Howe, Nathan Drummond |
| 2015 | Josh Schache, Clayton Oliver, Nick Coughlan |
| 2016 | Will Brodie, James Cousins |
| 2017 | Ben Paton |
| 2018 | Lachlan Ash, Jordon Butts, Hudson Garoni, Ely Smith |
| 2019 | Lachlan Ash |
| 2020 | NAB Cup in recess > COVID-19 |
| 2021 | Josh Rachele |
| 2022 | No player selected |
| 2023 | Connor O'Sullivan, Darcy Wilson |
| 2024 | |

== All Australian Team Selection ==
The following former Murray Bushrangers FC players were selected in various All Australian sides below.

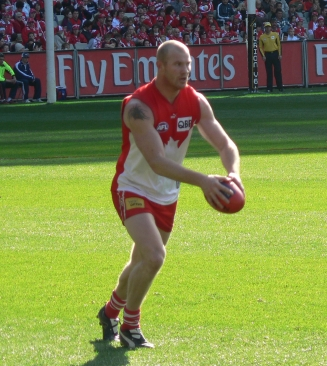
Barry Hall: Sydney Swans FC

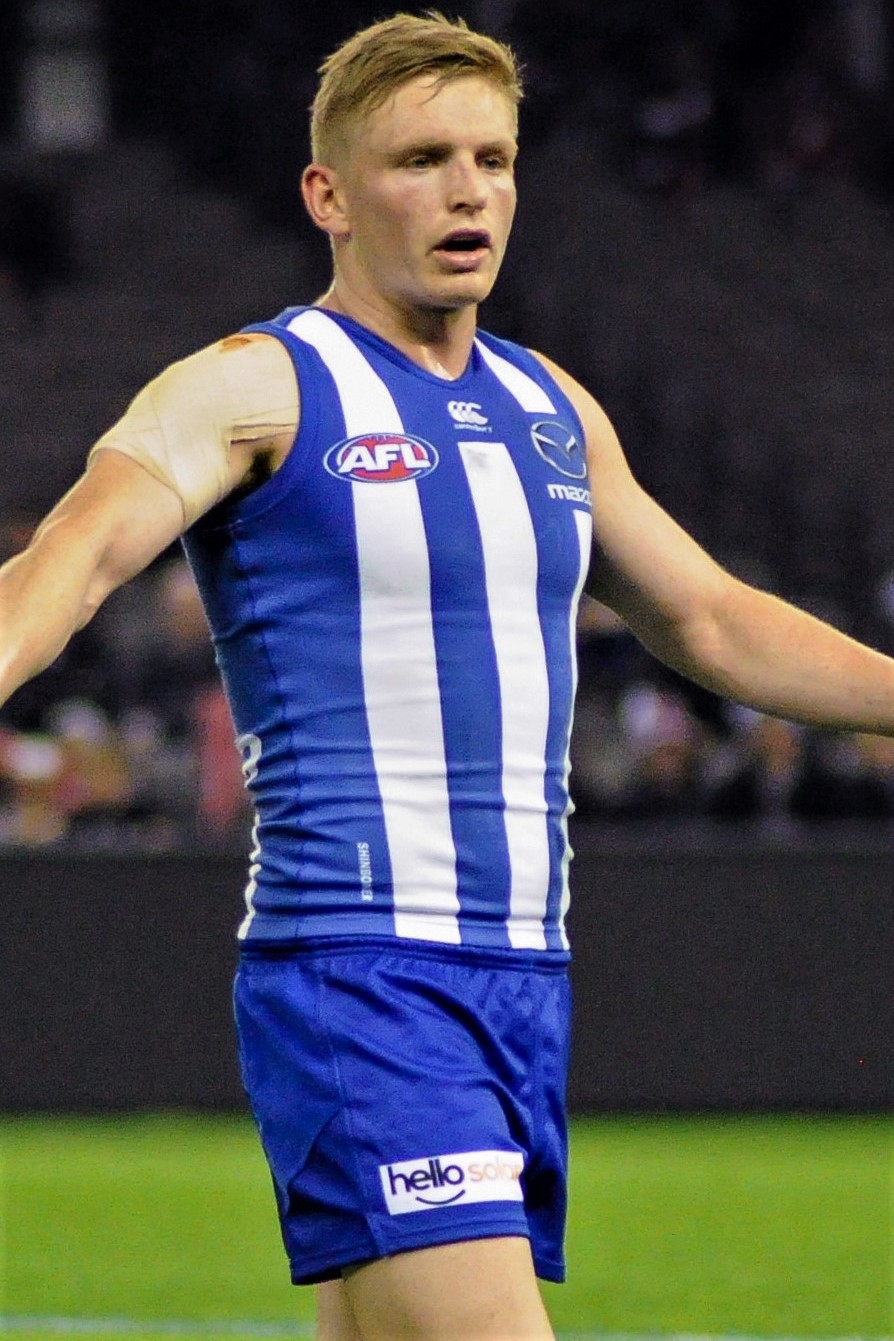
Jack Ziebell: North Melbourne FC

AFL - All Australian Side

| Year | Player's Name | Club |
|---|---|---|
| 1997 | Fraser Gehrig | West Coast Eagles |
| 2000 | Steven King | Geelong |
| 2001 | Joel Smith | Hawthorn |
| 2002 | Adam Yze | Melbourne |
| 2004 | Fraser Gehrig | St. Kilda |
| | Barry Hall | Sydney Swans |
| 2005 | Barry Hall | Sydney Swans |
| 2006 | Barry Hall | Sydney Swans |
| 2007 | Steve Johnson | Geelong |
| 2008 | Steve Johnson | Geelong |
| 2010 | Steve Johnson | Geelong |
| | Barry Hall | Sydney Swans |
| 2011 | Ben Reid | Collingwood |
| 2014 | Tom Rockliff | Brisbane Lions |
| 2015 | David Mundy | Fremantle |
| 2018 | Clayton Oliver | Melbourne |
| | Steele Sidebottom | Collingwood |
| 2021 | Clayton Oliver | Melbourne |
| 2022 | Clayton Oliver | Melbourne |

Under 18 - All Australian Side

| Year | U/18 - Player's Name | Club |
|---|---|---|
| 1996 | Nathan Tresize | Yarrawonga |
| 1998 | Chris Lamb | Wodonga Raiders |
| 1999 | Brad Horn | Lavington |
| 2000 | Kayne Pettifer | Kyabram |
| 2001 | Mark McGough | Mulwala |
| | Steve Johnson | Wangararatta |
| 2002 | Ryley Dunn | Shepparton |
| 2003 | Ryley Dunn | Shepparton |
| | Kane Tenace | Shepparton |
| | Shaun Daly | Corowa Rutherglen |
| 2004 | Brett Deledio | Kyabram |
| | Marcus Drum | Congupna |
| 2005 | No player selected | |
| 2006 | No player selected | |
| 2007 | Ben McEvoy | Dederang / Mt. Beauty |
| 2008 | Steele Sidebottom | Congupna |
| | Jack Ziebell | Wodonga |
| 2009 | Dylan O'Neill | Lavington |
| 2010 | Shaun Atley | Wodonga |
| 2011 | No player selected | |
| 2012 | No player selected | |
| 2013 | No player selected | |
| 2014 | Caleb Marchbank | Benalla |
| 2015 | Josh Schache | Seymour |
| 2016 | Will Brodie | Shepparton |
| 2017 | Ben Paton | Mitta United |
| 2018 | Jacob Koschitzke | Albury |
| 2019 | Lachlan Ash | Shepparton |
| 2020 | ? | |
| 2021 | ? | |
| 2022 | Oliver Hollands | Wodonga |
| 2023 | Connor O'Sullivan | Albury |
| 2024 | Joe Berry | Wangaratta |

Under 17 - All Australian Side

| Year | U/17 - Player's Name | Club |
|---|---|---|
| 1994 | Shaun Gordon | Congupna |
| 1995 | Adam Houlihan | Corowa Rutherglen |
| | Leigh Marshall | Deniliquin |
| 2006 | Ben Reid | Wangaratta Rovers |
| | Tim McIntyre | Corowa Rutherglen |
| | Ben McEvoy | Dederang / Mt. Beauty |
| | Ryan Normington | Shepparton United |

Underage Australian National Championships: Best Player Awards

| Year | Player's Name | State | Club |
Division One - Larke Medalist
| 1985 | Jason Kerr | NSW | North Albury |
| 2000 | Kayne Pettifer | Victoria | Kyabram |
| 2015 | Josh Schache | Victoria | Seymour |
Division Two - Hunter Harrison Medalist
| 1998 | Derek Murray | NSW | Lavington |
| 2009 | Dylan O'Neil | NSW | Lavington |
Under 16 Kevin Sheehan Medal
| 2003 | Brett Deledio | Victoria | Kyabram |

== AFL Rising Star Nominations ==
The following former Murray Bushrangers players were nominated as an AFL Rising Star.

| Year | Nominee | Club |
|---|---|---|
| 1995 | Joel Smith | St. Kilda |
| | Fraser Gehrig | St. Kilda |
| 1996 | Adam Yze | Melbourne |
| | Steven King | Geelong |
| 1997 | Adam Houlihan | Geelong |
| 1999 | Ben Mathews | Sydney Swans |
| 2000 | Josh Fraser | Collingwood |
| | Ryan Houlihan | Carlton |
| | Glen Bowyer | Hawthorn |
| 2001 | Aaron Henneman | Essendon |
| | Justin Koschitzke | St. Kilda |
| 2002 | Mark McGough | Collingwood |
| 2003 | Marc Bullen | Essendon |
| | Jarrad Waite | Carlton |
| 2004 | Daniel Cross | Footscray |
| | Kane Tenace | Geelong |
| 2005 | Brett Deledio | Richmond |
| | Shannon Byrnes | Geelong |
| 2008 | Alipate Carlile | Port Adelaide |
| 2009 | Jack Ziebell | North Melbourne |
| 2010 | Ben Reid | Collingwood |
| | Tom Rockliff | Brisbane Lions |
| | Sam Wright | North Melbourne |
| 2011 | Sam Reid | Sydney Swans |
| 2013 | Zac Williams | GWS |
| 2014 | Matt Taberner | Fremantle |
| 2016 | Clayton Oliver | Melbourne |
| 2017 | Caleb Marchbank | Carlton |
| 2021 | Jacob Koschitzke | Hawthorn |
| 2022 | Elijah Hollands | Gold Coast Suns |
| | Josh Rachele | Adelaide Crows |
| 2023 | Ollie Hollands | Carlton |
| 2024 | Darcy Wilson | St. Kilda |

== AFL Club Best & Fairest Award ==
The following former MBFC players have won an AFL club best and fairest award.

| Year | Winner | Club |
|---|---|---|
| 2000 | Steven King | Geelong |
| 2001 | Joel Smith | Hawthorn |
| | Adam Yze | Melbourne |
| 2002 | Steven King | Geelong |
| 2004 | Barry Hall | Sydney Swans |
| | David Teague | Carlton |
| 2008 | Daniel Cross | Footscray |
| | Brett Deledio | Richmond |
| 2009 | Brett Deledio | Richmond |
| 2010 | David Mundy | Fremantle |
| 2011 | Tom Rockliff | Brisbane Lions |
| 2014 | Tom Rockliff | Brisbane Lions |
| 2017 | Steele Sidebottom | Collingwood |
| | Clayton Oliver | Melbourne |
| 2018 | Jarrod Harbrow | Gold Coast Suns |
| | Steele Sidebottom | Collingwood |
| 2019 | Clayton Oliver | Melbourne |
| 2021 | Clayton Oliver | Melbourne |
| | Jack Crisp | Collingwood |
| 2022 | Clayton Oliver | Melbourne |
| | Jack Crisp | Collingwood |

== AFL Premiership Players ==
The following former MBFC players have played in an AFL Premiership team

| Year | Player | Club |
|---|---|---|
| 2005 | Barry Hall * | Sydney Swans |
| | Ben Mathews | Sydney Swans |
| 2007 | Shannon Byrnes | Geelong |
| | Steve Johnson | Geelong |
| | Steven King | Geelong |
| 2008 | Robert Campbell | Hawthorn |
| 2009 | Shannon Byrnes | Geelong |
| | Steve Johnson | Geelong |
| 2010 | Steele Sidebottom | Collingwood |
| | Ben Reid | Collingwood |
| 2011 | Steve Johnson | Geelong |
| 2012 | Sam Reid | Sydney Swans |
| 2014 | Ben McEvoy | Hawthorn |
| | Taylor Duryea | Hawthorn |
| 2015 | Ben McEvoy | Hawthorn |
| | Taylor Duryea | Hawthorn |
| 2021 | Clayton Oliver | Melbourne |
| 2023 | Jack Crisp | Collingwood |
| | Steele Sidebottom | Collingwood |

- - *Premiership Captain

== 100 plus AFL Games ==
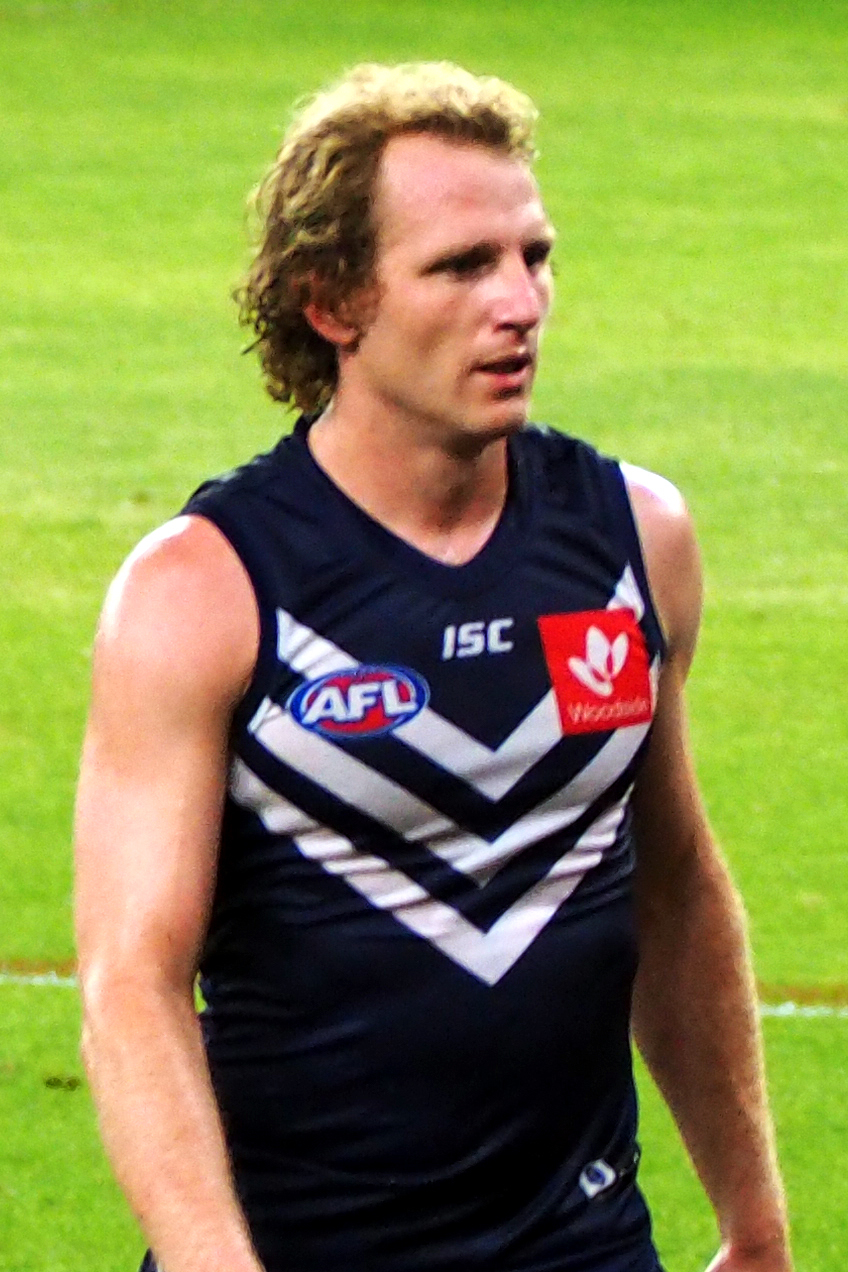
David Mundy: Fremantle FC

The following former MBFC players have played 100 plus senior AFL games. As of 2026, there are -

- 2 x 300 plus game players
- 20 x 200 plus game players
- 19 x 100 plus game players

| Career Span | Player | Club(s) | Games |
|---|---|---|---|
| 2004 - 2022 | David Mundy | Fremantle | 376 |
| 2009 - 2026 | Steele Sidebottom | Collingwood | 375 |
| 2012 - 2014 | Jack Crisp* | Brisbane Lions | 18 |
| 2015 - 2026 | Jack Crisp* | Collingwood | 280 (298) |
| 2002 - 2015 | Steve Johnson | Geelong | 253 |
| 2016 - 2017 | Steve Johnson | GWS | 40 (293) |
| 1996 - 2001 | Barry Hall | St. Kilda | 88 |
| 2002 - 2009 | Barry Hall | Sydney Swans | 162 |
| 2010 - 2011 | Barry Hall | Western Bulldogs | 39 (289) |
| 2008 - 2022 | Jack Ziebell | North Melbourne | 280 |
| 2005 - 2016 | Brett Deledio | Richmond | 243 |
| 2018 - 2019 | Brett Deledio | GWS | 32 (275) |
| 1995 - 2008 | Adam Yze | Melbourne | 271 |
| 2007 - 2010 | Jarrod Harbrow | Western Bulldogs | 70 |
| 2011 - 2021 | Jarrod Harbrow | Gold Coast | 192 (262) |
| 1995 - 2000 | Fraser Gehrig | West Coast | 115 |
| 2001 - 2008 | Fraser Gehrig | St. Kilda | 145 (260) |
| 2008 - 2013 | Ben McEvoy | St Kilda | 91 |
| 2014 - 2022 | Ben McEvoy | Hawthorn | 161 (252) |
| 2014 - 2017 | Jarman Impey* | Port Adelaide | 75 |
| 2018 - 2026 | Jarman Impey* | Hawthorn | 169 (244) |
| 2003 - 2014 | Jarrad Waite | Carlton | 184 |
| 2015 - 2018 | Jarrad Waite | North Melbourne | 60 (244) |
| 1996 - 2007 | Steven King | Geelong & | 193 |
| 2008 - 2010 | | St. Kilda | 47 (240) |
| 2016 - 2024 | Clayton Oliver* | Melbourne | 205 |
| 2026 - 2027 | | Gold Coast | 21 (226) |
| 2011 - 2021 | Shaun Atley | North Melbourne | 234 |
| 1995 - 1997 | Joel Smith | St. Kilda & | 58 |
| 1998 - 2007 | | Hawthorn | 163 (221) |
| 2010 - 2018 | Taylor Duryea | Hawthorn & | 118 |
| 2019 - 2025 | | Western Bulldogs | 101 (219) |
| 2000 - 2010 | Josh Fraser | Collingwood & | 200 |
| 2011 - 2012 | | Gold Coast | 18 (218) |
| 2009 - 2017 | Tom Rockliff | Brisbane Lions & | 154 |
| 2018 - 2021 | | Port Adelaide | 54 (208) |
| 2000 - 2011 | Ryan Houlihan | Carlton | 201 |
| 2001 - 2013 | Justin Koschitzke | St. Kilda | 200 |
| 1997 - 2008 | Ben Mathews | Sydney Swans | 198 |
| 2017 - 2026 | Jy Simpkin* | North Melbourne | 196 |
| 2013 - 2020 | Zac Williams | GWS | 113 |
| 2021 - 2024 | | Carlton | 70 (183) |
| 2010 - 2024 | Sam Reid | Sydney Swans | 181 |
| 2006 - 2016 | Alipate Carlile | Port Adelaide | 167 |
| 2014 - 2015 | Nick Holman | Carlton & | 9 |
| 2018 - 2026 | | Gold Coast | 145 (154) |
| 2007 - 2020 | Ben Reid | Collingwood | 152 |
| 2020 - 2027 | Lachie Ash* | Gold Coast | 146 |
| 2015 - 2019 | Dougal Howard | Port Adelaide & | 45 |
| 2020 - 2026 | | St. Kilda | 100 (145) |
| 2009 - 2019 | Sam Wright | North Melbourne | 136 |
| 2017 - 2026 | Todd Marshall* | Port Adelaide | 131 |
| 2018 - 2025 | Charlie Spargo* | Melbourne | 108 |
| 2026 - 2027 | | North Melbourne | 17 (125) |
| 2003 - 2012 | Hamish McIntosh | North Melbourne & | 107 |
| 2013 - 2015 | | Geelong | 19 (126) |
| 2013 - 2024 | Tom Clurey | Port Adelaide | 124 |
| 2013 - 2024 | Matt Taberner | Fremantle | 124 |
| 2018 - 2023 | Esava Ratugolea* | Geelong | 75 |
| 2024 - 2026 | | Port Adelaide | 44 (119) |
| 2021 - 2027 | Sam Durham* | Essendon | 111 |
| 2010 - 2012 | Jonathon Ceglar | Collingwood | 0 |
| 2013 - 2021 | | Hawthorn | 101 |
| 2022 - 2023 | | Geelong | 9 (110) |
| 2016 - 2019 | Alex Keath | Adelaide Crows | 30 |
| 2020 - 2024 | | Footscray | 79 (109) |
| 2015 - 2022 | Daniel Howe | Hawthorn & | 96 |
| 2023 | | North Melbourne | 11 (107) |
| Career Span | Player | Club(s) | Games |

- - * Current player

== MCFC Leading Goalkicker ==
The following MB players were the club's leading goal kickers.

| Year | Player's Name | Goals |
|---|---|---|
| 1993 | Jason Campbell | |
| 1994 | Jason McMartin | |
| 1995 | Barry Hall | |
| 1996 | Rohan Graham | |
| 1997 | Heath Younie | |
| 1998 | Ricky Symes | |
| 1999 | Brad Maxwell | |
| 2000 | | |
| 2001 | | |
| 2002 | | |
| 2003 | | |
| 2004 | | |
| 2005 | | |
| 2006 | | |
| 2007 | | |
| 2008 | | |
| 2009 | | |
| 2010 | | |
| 2011 | Nick Warnock | 12 |
| 2012 | Joshua Porter | 18 |
| 2013 | Jydon Neagle | 16 |
| 2014 | Josh Schache | 27 |
| 2015 | Josh Schache* | 34 |
| 2016 | ? | |
| 2017 | Daniel Johnston | 45 |
| 2018 | Hudson Garoni | 15 |
| 2019 | Hudson Kaak | 19 |
| 2020 | In recess>COVID-19 | |
| 2021 | Cameron McLeod | 12 |
| 2022 | Braden George & | 19 |
| | Fletcher Hart | 19 |
| 2023 | Darcy Wilson | 17 |
| 2024 | Joshua Murphy* | 32 |
| 2025 | Blake Newton | 22 |
| 2026 | Jethro Snelling | 20 |
| 2027 | | |

- - * Also won the TAC Cup goalkicking

== Murray Bushrangers FC Best Team, 1993 to 2012 ==
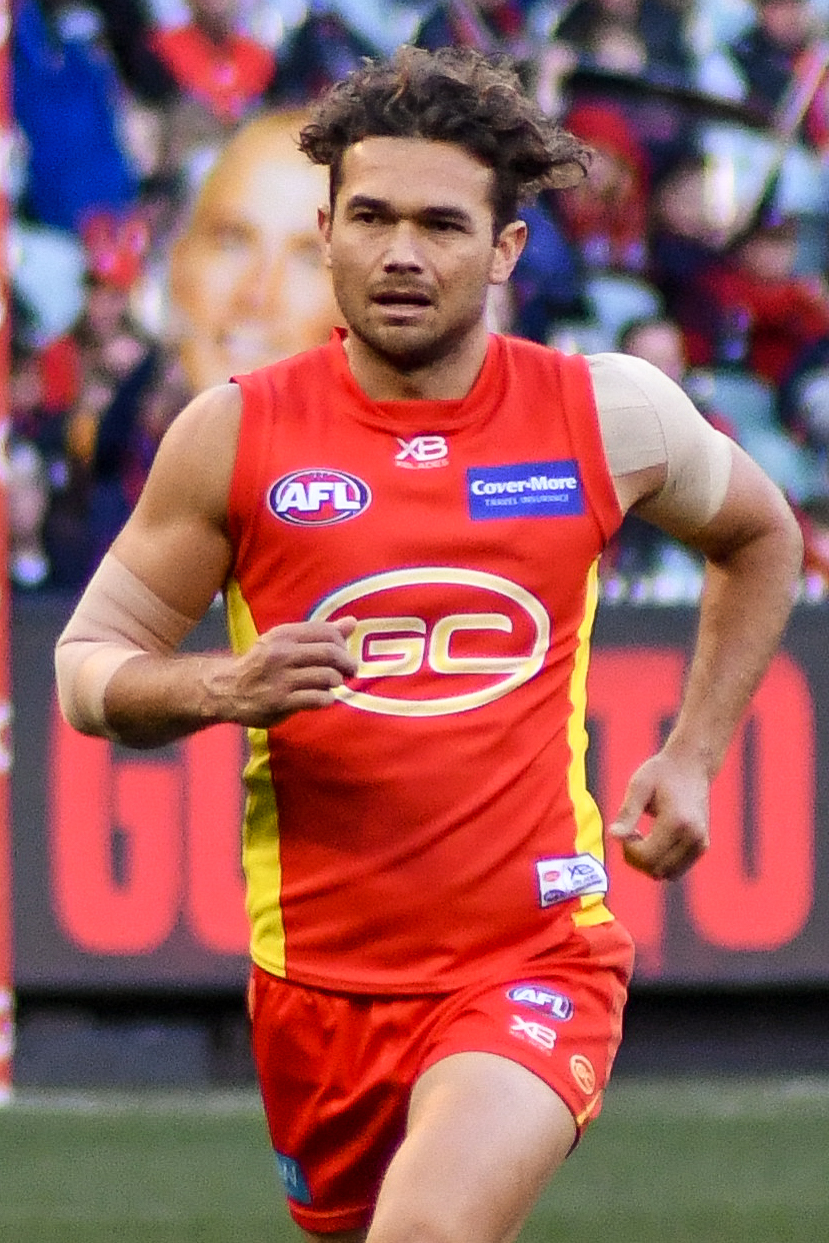
Jarrod Harbrow: Gold Coast FC

The Murray Bushrangers FC celebrated their first twenty years in the pre-eminent under 18 boys football competition in Australia, the TAC Cup by announcing their best ever football side in July 2012.

Murray Bushrangers FC Best Team - 1993 to 2012

- Backline: Ben Mathews (Sydney), Ben Reid (Collingwood), Ryan Houlihan (Carlton)
- Half Backline: Joel Smith (St Kilda/Hawthorn), Jarrad Waite (Carlton), David Mundy (Fremantle)
- Centreline: Steele Sidebottom (Collingwood), Brett Deledio (Richmond), Adam Yze (Melbourne)
- Half Forwardline: Steve Johnson (Geelong), Barry Hall (St Kilda/Sydney/Footscray), Shannon Byrnes (Geelong)
- Forwardline: Josh Fraser (Collingwood/Gold Coast), Fraser Gehrig (West Coast/St Kilda), Justin Koschitzke (St Kilda)
- Followers:Steven King (Geelong/St Kilda, Daniel Cross (Footscray), Tom Rockliff (Brisbane Lions)
- Interchange:Robert Campbell (Hawthorn), David Teague (North Melbourne/Carlton), Rory Hilton (Richmond/Brisbane Lions), Hamish McIntosh (North Melbourne/Geelong), Alipate Carlile (Port Adelaide), Jarrod Harbrow (Footscray/Gold Coast)

== Club Honourboard ==
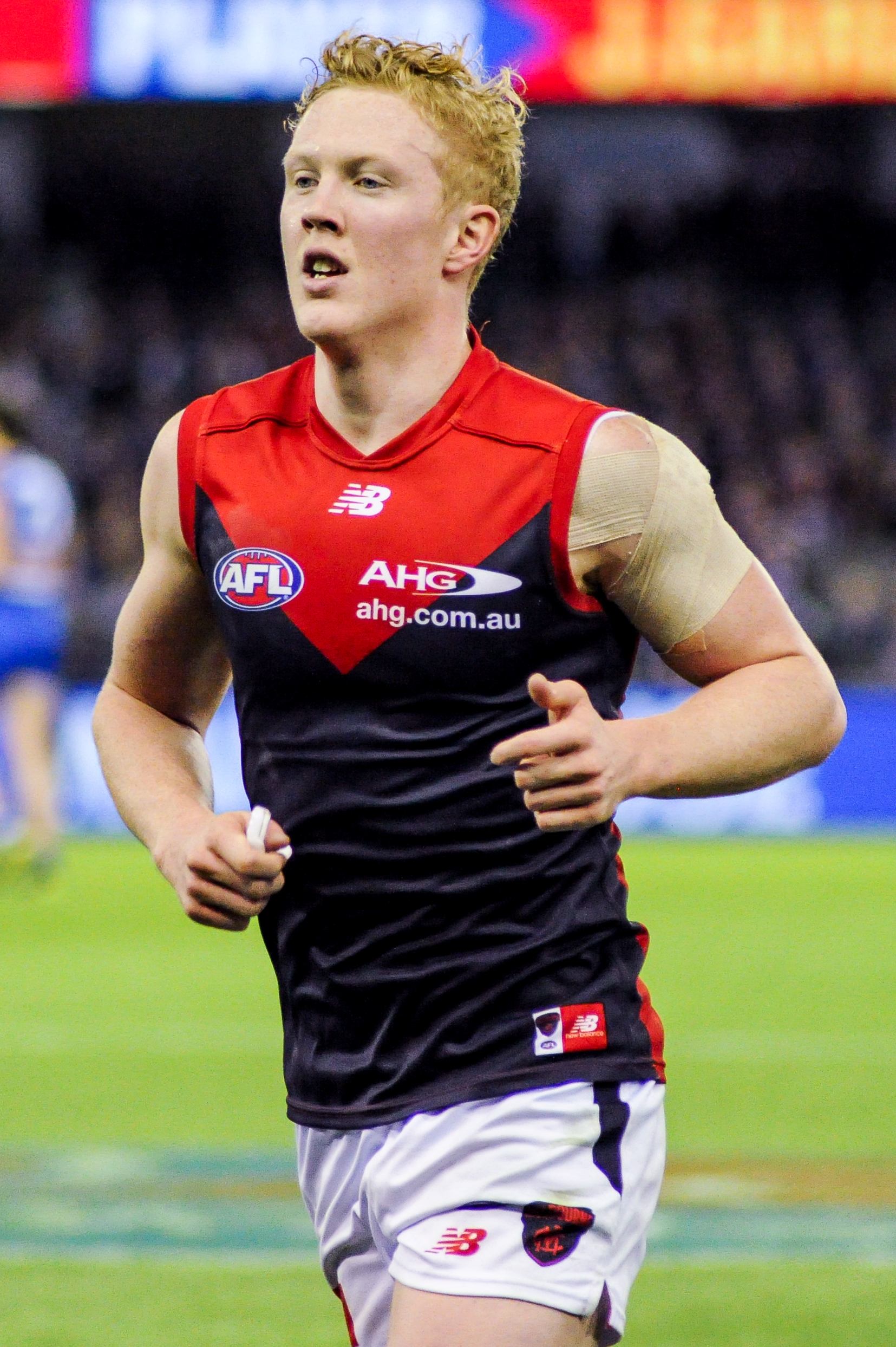
Clayton Oliver: Melbourne FC

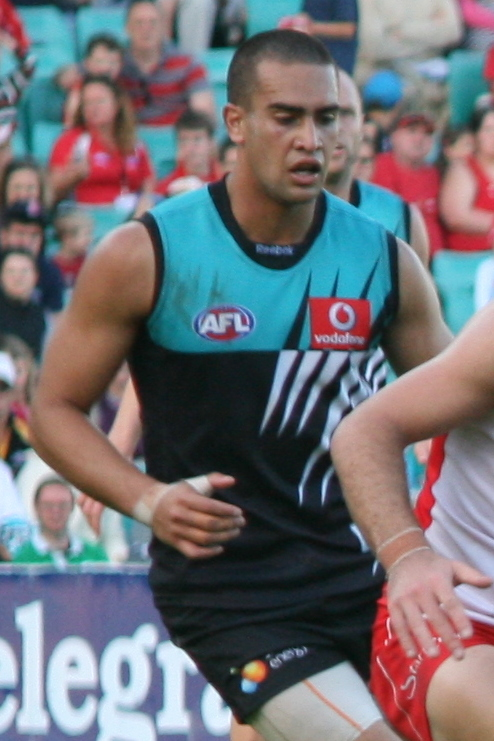
Alipate Carlile: Port Adelaide FC

| | Murray Bushrangers FC: Under 18 BOYS - TAC Cup | | | | |
| Year | Coach | Manager | Captain | Best & Fairest | Ladder |
|---|---|---|---|---|---|
| 1993 | Gary Foulds | John Byrne | Clint Whitsed | Fraser Gehrig | 8th |
| 1994 | Kelly O'Donnell | John Byrne | Mark Knobel | Jason Sheather | 6th |
| 1995 | Kelly O'Donnell | John Byrne | Jason Sheather | Rob Thorton | 6th |
| 1996 | Kelly O'Donnell | John Byrne | Matthew Byers | Matthew Byers | 10th |
| 1997 | Kelly O'Donnell | John Byrne | Matthew Hyde/Joel McKay/Heath Younie | Matthew Hyde | 2nd |
| 1998 | Kelly O'Donnell | John Byrne | Derek Murray/John Shiels | Adam Pearce | **1st** |
| 1999 | Kelly O'Donnell | John Byrne | Todd Brown / Matthew Shir | Craig Ednie | 1st* |
| 2000 | Kelly O'Donnell | John Byrne | Criag Ednie/Chris Hyde/Marc Bullen | Kayne Pettifer | 1st* |
| 2001 | Xavier Tanner | John Byrne | Josh Dicketts | Mark McGough | 1st* |
| 2002 | Xavier Tanner | John Byrne | Lachie Longmire/Corey Brown/Shannon Byrnes | Cory Brown | 2nd |
| 2003 | Xavier Tanner | John Byrne | Ryley Dunn/Will Gayfer | Kane Tenace | 2nd (R/Up) |
| 2004 | Xavier Tanner | John Byrne | Jayden Kotzer/Michael Davidson | Jordan Wood | 9th |
| 2005 | Xavier Tanner | John Byrne | Marcus Drum | Marcus Drum | 8th |
| 2006 | Peter Dean | John Byrne | Brad Collins | Mark Tyrell | 9th |
| 2007 | Peter Dean | John Byrne | | Ben McEvoy | 2nd (R/Up) |
| 2008 | Phil Bunn | John Byrne | | Steele Sidebottom | **1st** |
| 2009 | Phil Bunn | John Byrne | | Dylan McNeill | 10th |
| 2010 | Darren Ogier | Andrew Carson | | **John Byrne Medal** | 8th |
| | | | | Shaun Atley & | |
| | | | | Willie Wheeler | |
| 2011 | Darren Ogier | Andrew Carson | | Jack Crisp | 11th |
| 2012 | Darren Ogier | Andrew Carson | | Sam Martyn | 8th |
| 2013 | Darren Ogier | Andrew Carson | | Bryden Squires | 8th |
| 2014 | Darren Ogier | Lee Fraser | Nick Mellington | Nathan Drummond | 5th |
| 2015 | Darren Ogier | Lee Fraser | | Clayton Oliver | 3rd |
| 2016 | Leon Higgins | Mick Wilson | | James Cousins | 2nd (R/Up) |
| 2017 | Leon Higgins | Mick Wilson | | | 5th |
| 2018 | Leon Higgins | Mick Wilson | Harry Beasley/Elijah Hollands | Ely Smith | 5th |
| 2019 | Mark Brown | Mick Wilson | Lachie Ash & | Jye Chalcraft & | 9th |
| | | | Cam Wilson | Jimmy Boyer | |
| 2020 | Mark Brown | Mick Wilson | | In recess > COVID-19 | N/A |
| 2021 | Mark Brown | Mick Wilson | Kade Chalcraft | Kade Chalcraft | 12th |
| 2022 | Mark Brown | Mick Wilson | | Noah Bradshaw & | 9th |
| | | | | Ryan Eyers | |
| 2023 | Mark Brown | Mick Wilson | Darcy Wilson | Darcy Wilson | 13th |
| 2024 | Mark Brown | Mick Wilson | Zac Harding | Joe Berry & | 7th |
| | | | | Max Mahoney | |
| 2025 | Mark Brown | Mick Wilson | | Cody Gardiner | 16th |
| 2026 | Justin McMahon | Mick Wilson | Zac Lambert | Jackson Hewitt | 17th |
| 2027 | Justin McMahon | Mick Wilson | | | |
| **Year** | **Coach** | **Manager** | **Captain(s)** | **Best & Fairest** | **Ladder** |

- 1st*: Minor premiers
- 1st: Bold - Major premiers

| | Murray Bushrangers FC: Under 18 GIRLS - TAC Cup | | |
| Year | Coach | Best & Fairest | Ladder |
|---|---|---|---|
| 2017 | | | 2nd |
| 2018 | | Tamara Smith | 7th |
| 2019 | | | 9th |
| 2020 | | In recess>COVID-19 | N/A |
| 2021 | | | 10th |
| 2022 | | | 8th |
| 2023 | Emma Mackie | | 17th |
| 2024 | Emma Mackie | | |

== Talent League Girls ==
- Premierships (0): Nil
- Runners-up (1): 2017

== Notes/References ==
- Lovett, Michael, ed. (21 April 2024). AFL Record Season Guide 2010. G. Slattery. pp. 906–907. ISBN 978-0-9806274-5-9.
