= Ben Matthews =

Ben Matthews may refer to:

- Ben Matthews (musician) (born 1963), guitarist and keyboard player with Thunder
- Ben Matthews (real tennis) (born 1984), British real tennis player

== See also ==
- Ben Mathews (born 1978), Australian rules footballer
