= Joel Smith =

Australian rules footballer, born 1977

Joel Michael Smith

Personal information
- Born: 3 May 1977 (age 49)
- Original team: Yarrawonga / Murray Bushrangers
- Debut: Round 3, 16 April 1995, St Kilda vs. Adelaide, at Football Park
- Height: 185 cm (6 ft 1 in)
- Weight: 87 kg (192 lb)

Playing career^{1}
Years	Club	Games (Goals)
1995–1997	St Kilda	58 (51)
1998–2007	Hawthorn	163 (39)
Total		221 (90)
- ^{1} Playing statistics correct to the end of 2007.

Career highlights
- 2× All-Australian team: 2001, 2003; Peter Crimmins Memorial Trophy: 2001; AFL pre-season premiership: 1996; AFL Rising Star nominee: 1995

Joel Smith (born 3 May 1977) is a former Australian rules footballer.

Beginning his career in 1995 as a bright young prospect for St Kilda, Smith played in the winning team in the club's first AFL Cup victory, the 1996 AFL Ansett Australia Cup.

He provided three good years of service before being incurring a serious anterior cruciate ligament injury requiring reconstruction late in the 1997 home and away season, missing the Saints' finals series.

A contractual dispute meant he moved to Hawthorn at the end of 1997. While he was injured throughout 1998 and did not play a game, Hawthorn recognised this talent and kept him on their list.

Smith made his return in the 1999 season and played as a running half-back, setting up attacking plays. He was successful in this role throughout his career and in 2001 won All-Australian selection and the Peter Crimmins Medal. He again won All-Australian selection in 2003, was vice captain in the 2005 season and consistently finished among the leadings players in the club's best and fairest award.

Smith retired at the end of the 2007 season, during which Hawthorn returned to the finals for the first time in six years, declaring that the rapidly improving Hawthorn side was likely to mean reduced opportunities for him in 2008.

== Statistics ==
Legend
G	Goals	K	Kicks	D	Disposals	T	Tackles
B	Behinds	H	Handballs	M	Marks

Season	Team	No.	Games	Totals							Averages (per game)							Votes
Season	Team	No.	Games	G	B	K	H	D	M	T	G	B	K	H	D	M	T	Votes
1995	St Kilda	4	20	6	7	190	99	289	65	25	0.3	0.4	9.5	5.0	14.5	3.3	1.3	1
1996	St Kilda	4	22	22	22	246	122	368	96	30	1.0	1.0	11.2	5.5	16.7	4.4	1.4	1
1997	St Kilda	4	16	23	17	207	94	301	63	17	1.4	1.1	12.9	5.9	18.8	3.9	1.1	3
1998	Hawthorn	11	0	—	—	—	—	—	—	—	—	—	—	—	—	—	—	—
1999	Hawthorn	11	17	8	12	130	58	188	34	14	0.5	0.7	7.6	3.4	11.1	2.0	0.8	2
2000	Hawthorn	11	17	10	5	131	77	208	52	17	0.6	0.3	7.7	4.5	12.2	3.1	1.0	0
2001	Hawthorn	11	24	0	5	315	87	402	82	33	0.0	0.2	13.1	3.6	16.8	3.4	1.4	7
2002	Hawthorn	11	5	2	2	62	18	80	19	5	0.4	0.4	12.4	3.6	16.0	3.8	1.0	1
2003	Hawthorn	11	22	5	6	222	92	314	76	43	0.2	0.3	10.1	4.2	14.3	3.5	2.0	3
2004	Hawthorn	11	22	7	2	261	106	367	73	48	0.3	0.1	11.9	4.8	16.7	3.3	2.2	0
2005	Hawthorn	11	20	4	4	233	146	379	95	24	0.2	0.2	11.7	7.3	19.0	4.8	1.2	5
2006	Hawthorn	11	19	0	1	199	115	314	111	28	0.0	0.1	10.5	6.1	16.5	5.8	1.5	0
2007	Hawthorn	11	17	3	5	147	124	271	93	28	0.2	0.3	8.6	7.3	15.9	5.5	1.6	0
Career			221	90	88	2343	1138	3481	859	312	0.4	0.4	10.6	5.1	15.8	3.9	1.4	23
