= Joe Atley =

Australian rules footballer

Personal information
- Full name: Joseph Atley
- Born: 4 August 1998 (age 28)
- Original teams: Rochester, Bendigo Pioneers (TAC Cup)
- Draft: No. 32, 2016 national draft
- Debut: Round 16, 2017, Port Adelaide vs. West Coast, at Domain Stadium
- Height: 186 cm (6 ft 1 in)
- Weight: 84 kg (185 lb)
- Position: Midfielder

Playing career^{1}
Years	Club	Games (Goals)
2017–2020	Port Adelaide	4 (0)
- ^{1} Playing statistics correct to the end of 2019.

Joseph Atley (born 4 August 1998) is a professional Australian rules footballer playing for the Port Adelaide Football Club in the Australian Football League (AFL). He was drafted by Port Adelaide with their third selection and thirty-second overall in the 2016 national draft. He made his debut in the thirty-two point win against West Coast at Domain Stadium in round sixteen of the 2017 season. Joe is the brother of Shaun Atley, who played eleven seasons for North Melbourne (2011-2021).
