= Hayden Lamaro =

Australian rules footballer

Personal information
- Full name: Hayden Lamaro
- Born: 3 October 1978 (age 48)
- Original team: Euroa / Murray Bushrangers
- Draft: 30th selection, 1996 draft (Melbourne)
- Height: 185 cm (6 ft 1 in)
- Weight: 76 kg (168 lb)
- Position: Half back / Wing

Playing career^{1}
Years	Club	Games (Goals)
1997–1998	Melbourne	2 (0)
- ^{1} Playing statistics correct to the end of 1998.

Hayden Lamaro (born 3 October 1978) is a former Australian rules footballer who played for the Melbourne Football Club in the Australian Football League (AFL).

== Early life ==
Originally from Euroa in north-eastern Victoria, Lamaro played his junior football for Euroa Football Club in the Goulburn Valley Football Netball League (GVFL). Lamaro also played for the Murray Bushrangers in the TAC Cup. The left-footer had an outstanding 1996 season, representing the Victorian Metro side at the AFL Under 18 Championships, being named in the TAC Cup Team of the Year and winning the Bushrangers' Most Improved Award.

== AFL career ==
Described as an athletic player with excellent skills, Lamaro came to the attention of AFL recruiters. He was drafted by Melbourne with the 30th selection in the 1996 AFL draft. Lamaro spent the entire 1997 season playing with the Demons' reserves before making his debut in the first round of 1998. His first AFL game, however, was disappointing; he had only one disposal (a handball) and gave away two free kicks in a losing Melbourne side. Lamaro was dropped back to the reserves the following week and was only recalled to the senior side in round 9 for a match against Essendon, after playing well in the reserves. His second AFL match was little better than his first, again having only one disposal in another Melbourne loss. Dropped back to the reserves once more, Lamaro failed to break back into the seniors for the rest of the season, although he was continually impressive in the reserves. After only two disappointing matches in two years at the club, Lamaro was delisted by Melbourne at the end of 1998.

== Post-AFL career ==
After being delisted by the Demons Lamaro returned to his old team, Euroa Football Club. He played for Euroa from 1999 to 2008, playing his 150th match for the club in his final season with the club and representing the GVFL on six occasions. In the off-seasons, Lamaro played for Euroa Cricket Club, setting a record partnership in 2000. During his time with Euroa, Lamaro was called up to play for Carlton's reserves side in 2002. He ended up playing only one match in the reserves for Carlton and played the rest of the season with Euroa, winning the club's best and fairest award. After 10 seasons with Euroa, Lamaro moved to play with Craigieburn in the Essendon District Football League for 2009. He spent only one season with the Eagles, signing on to coach Mernda in the second division of the Northern Football League. Mernda hoped to play finals, with an aim of making it to division one, but after a poor start to the season, the Demons finished fifth, missing the finals by one position. Although a disappointing year for Mernda, Lamaro was impressive, regularly being the club's leading goalkicker. Lamaro's contract was not renewed at the end of 2010 and he signed on to coach Violet Town, a team which his father, Daffy, played 175 games for, in the Kyabram & District Football League for the 2011 season.
