= Mark McGough =

Australian rules footballer, born 1984

Personal information
- Born: 22 June 1984 (age 42)
- Original team: Mulwala / Murray Bushrangers
- Debut: Round 4, 20 April 2002, Collingwood vs. Hawthorn, at the MCG
- Height: 188 cm (6 ft 2 in)
- Weight: 87 kg (192 lb)

Playing career^{1}
Years	Club	Games (Goals)
2002–2004	Collingwood	37 (12)
2005–2006	St Kilda	12 (2)
2010–2015	East Fremantle	103 (37)
Total		152 (51)
- ^{1} Playing statistics correct to the end of 2015.

Career highlights
- AFL Rising Star nominee 2002; AFL Anzac Medal 2002

Mark McGough (born 22 June 1984) is an Australian rules football player who played with the Collingwood and St Kilda football clubs in the Australian Football League (AFL).

== AFL career ==
He was selected by Collingwood in the third round of the 2001 AFL draft. Aged 17, and in just his second game of senior football, McGough was awarded the AFL Anzac Medal as the best on ground in the 2002 Anzac Day clash between Collingwood and Essendon. In 2011, before his last Anzac Day match as Collingwood coach, Mick Malthouse said his favourite memory from his 11 Anzac Day encounters was seeing McGough win the Anzac Medal.

Despite being regarded as a good wet weather player, his lack of pace prevented him from being regularly selected to play for Collingwood's senior side. After playing 37 senior matches in three years, McGough was delisted at the end of the 2004 season.

McGough was picked by the St Kilda Football Club in the third round of the 2004 AFL draft, and played nine senior matches for the club in the 2005 season. He was delisted by St Kilda at the end of 2006, having played just three games for the year. This marked the end of McGough’s AFL career at the age of only 22.

== After AFL ==
After his AFL career, McGough spent part of 2007 on an exchange program in the United States, studying journalism at the University of Arizona and later that year spent time in South America. In 2008 he returned to Australia, where he played football with the Montmorency Football Club in Victoria's Northern Football League. In 2010, he joined the East Fremantle Football Club in the West Australian Football League and was club captain until the end of the 2013 season. He then became a teacher at high schools in Perth such as Seton Catholic College and Emmanuel Catholic College and La Salle College.
