= Kane Tenace =

Australian rules footballer, born 1985

Personal information
- Full name: Kane Tenace
- Born: 4 July 1985 (age 41); Victoria, Australia
- Original team: Shepparton / Murray Bushrangers
- Height: 182 cm (6 ft 0 in)
- Weight: 86 kg (190 lb)
- Position: Wing

Club information
- Current club: Glenelg
- Number: 10

Playing career^{1}
| Years | Club | Games (Goals) |
| 2004–2009 | Geelong | 59 (12) |
- ^{1} Playing statistics correct to the end of 2009.

Career highlights
- AFL: AFL Pre-Season Premiership Player (2006); AFL Rising Star Nomination (2004); Geelong: Geelong FC Best First Year Player Award (2004); TAC Cup: TAC Cup Premiership Player (2003); U/18 All Australian (2003); TAC Cup Team of the Year (2003); Vic Country U/18 (2003); Murray Bushrangers Best & Fairest Award (2003); Vice-Captain of Murray Bushrangers (2003); Vic Country U/18 (2002)

Kane Tenace (born 4 July 1985) is an Australian rules footballer who played for the Geelong Football Club in the Australian Football League (AFL).

== Career ==
=== Draft ===
Tenace was selected with the 7th Pick in the 2003 AFL draft by Geelong Football Club. He was recruited from the Murray Bushrangers in the TAC Cup.

=== Debut ===
Tenace debuted against Carlton in Round 2, 2004. His first season was fairly impressive, earning an AFL Rising Star nomination in Round 6, and winning Geelong's Best First Year Player Award.

=== 2006 ===
In 2006, Tenace completed his third season at senior level and had a reasonable year. He played the first eight games, but managed only another six after injuring his knee and missing rounds nine to twelve. In Round 14, he had a career-high 21 disposals against Carlton.

=== 2007 ===
Tenace began his fourth season in the AFL impressively, averaging just over 19 possessions a game, including a career-high 28 in Geelong's round eight win over Fremantle. However, he was struck down with hamstring problems in the second half of the season after playing his last senior game for the season in round 14. These injuries caused Tenace to miss playing in either of Geelong's winning AFL and VFL Premiership teams.

At the conclusion of the season, after attracting interest from several AFL clubs, Tenace agreed to a new two-year deal to remain at the club until at least the end of the 2009 season.

=== 2009 ===
Kane Tenace had a disappointing season, which resulted in him being delisted from Geelong.

== Post AFL career ==
Tenace moved to Adelaide in 2010 to play for Glenelg in the South Australian National Football League (SANFL). He performed well in his first season with Glenelg, finishing second in the club's fairest and best award. At the end of the 2013 season he moved back to Victoria to play for the St Mary's in the Geelong Football League.

== Statistics ==
Statistics are correct as of end of 2008 season (27 September 2008)

| Season | Team | No. | Games | Goals | Behinds | Kicks | Marks | Handballs | Disposals |
|---|---|---|---|---|---|---|---|---|---|
| 2004 | Geelong | 10 | 12 | 4 | 3 | 94 | 22 | 33 | 127 |
| 2005 | Geelong | 10 | 18 | 3 | 1 | 165 | 48 | 64 | 229 |
| 2006 | Geelong | 10 | 14 | 3 | 1 | 150 | 47 | 51 | 201 |
| 2007 | Geelong | 10 | 9 | 1 | 1 | 96 | 39 | 62 | 158 |
| 2008 | Geelong | 10 | 1 | 0 | 0 | 5 | 2 | 11 | 16 |
| Totals | | | 54 | 11 | 6 | 510 | 158 | 221 | 731 |
