= Sam Schulz =

Australian rules footballer (born 1992)

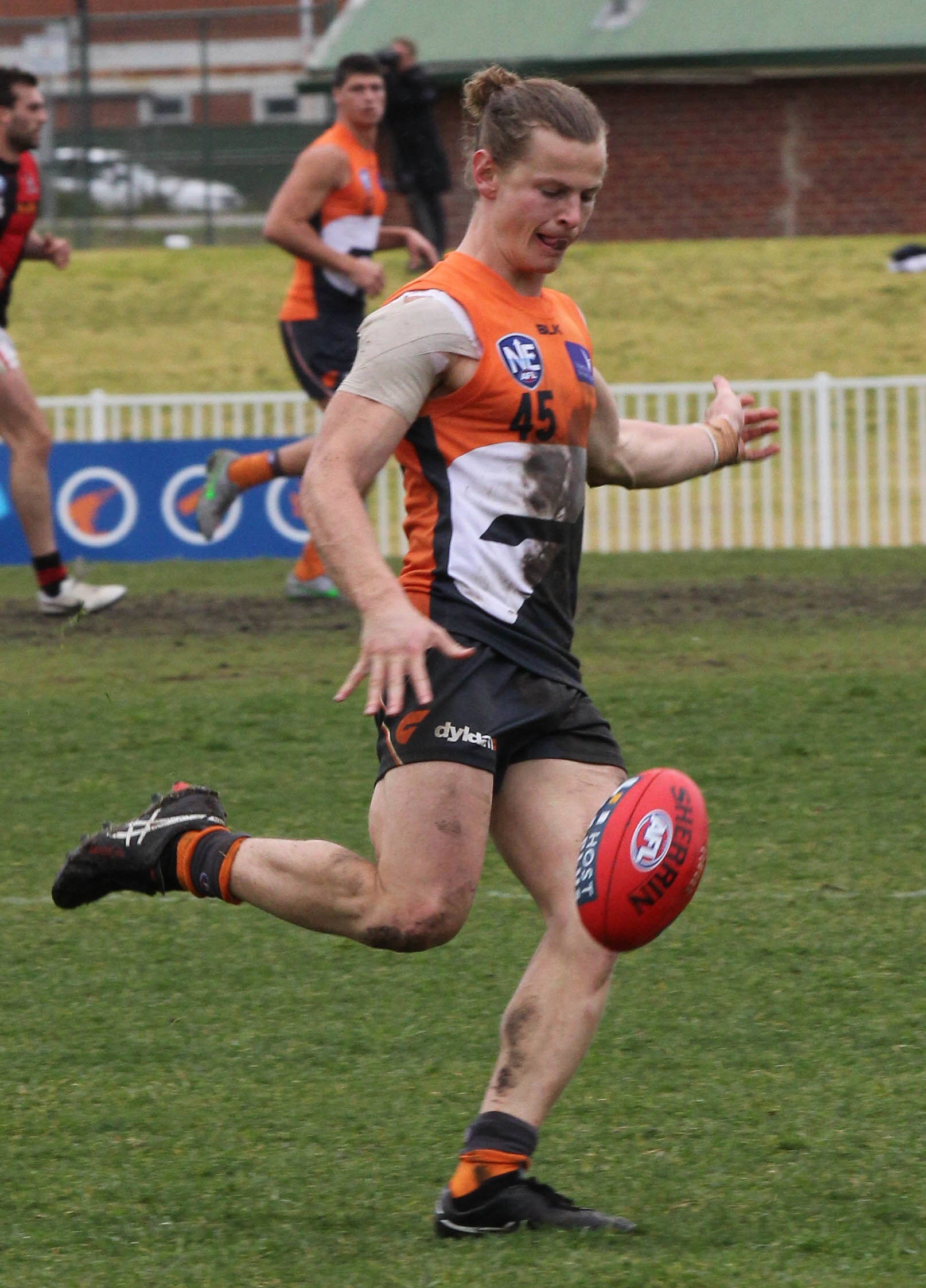
- Schulz in August 2015

Personal information
- Full name: Samuel Craig Schulz
- Born: 19 September 1992 (age 34); Culcairn, New South Wales
- Original teams: Culcairn (Hume Football League); Murray Bushrangers (TAC Cup)
- Draft: 2010 NSW Zone Selection, Greater Western Sydney
- Height: 183 cm (6 ft 0 in)
- Weight: 79 kg (174 lb)
- Position: Midfielder

Playing career^{1}
Years	Club	Games (Goals)
2012–2015	Greater Western Sydney	1 (1)
- ^{1} Playing statistics correct to the end of 2015.

Career highlights
- du huso

Samuel Craig Schulz (born 19 September 1992) is a former professional Australian rules footballer who played for the Greater Western Sydney Giants in the Australian Football League (AFL).

Originally from Culcairn in the Riverina region of New South Wales, he played for the Murray Bushrangers in the TAC Cup prior to being recruited as one of the Giants first NSW zone selections in mid-2010. Schulz made his AFL debut in round 12 of the 2012 AFL season against Richmond.

At the conclusion of 2013, Schulz was delisted, however he was later re-drafted by GWS in the 2014 rookie draft.

After failing to play a game since his debut in 2012, he was delisted in October 2015.
