= Shaun Atley =

Australian rules footballer

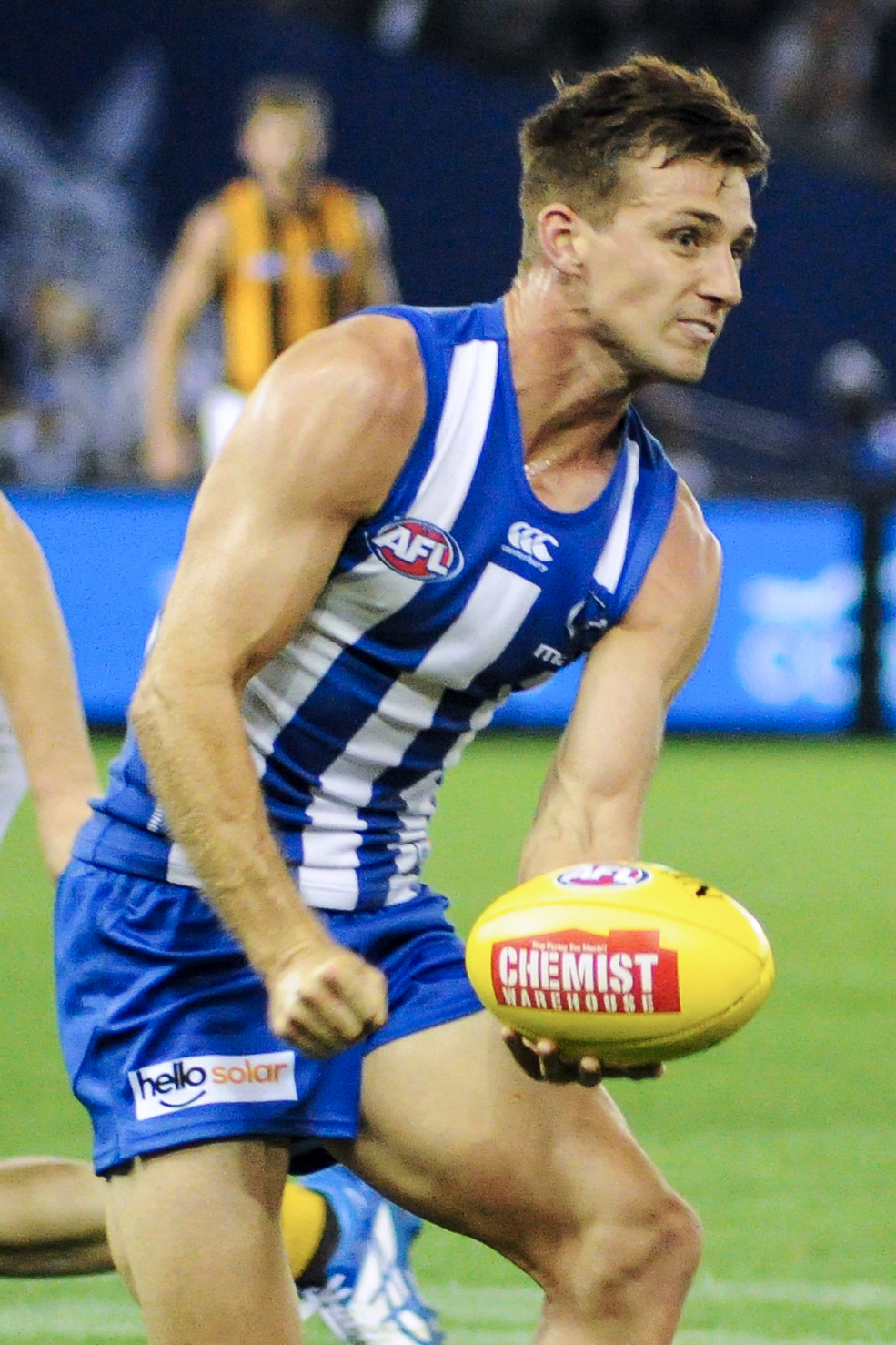
- Atley playing for North Melbourne in April 2018

Personal information
- Full name: Shaun Atley
- Born: 13 September 1992 (age 34); Echuca, Victoria
- Original team: Murray Bushrangers (TAC Cup)
- Draft: No. 17, 2010 National draft, North Melbourne
- Height: 189 cm (6 ft 2 in)
- Weight: 86 kg (190 lb)
- Position: Midfielder

Playing career^{1}
Years	Club	Games (Goals)
2011–2021	North Melbourne	234 (44)
- ^{1} Playing statistics correct to the end of 2021.

Shaun Atley (born 13 September 1992) is a former professional Australian rules footballer who played for the North Melbourne Football Club in the Australian Football League (AFL). Originally from Rochester, Atley was taken with draft pick #17 in the 2010 National draft by North Melbourne. Prior to being drafted, he played both as a half-back and as a midfielder. He debuted the following year, in the 2011 AFL season. Atley made his debut in Round 1, against West Coast.

2012 was a much more successful year for Atley. He played every possible game, and was noted as one of the competition's most improved player. The catalyst of this change of form was a move to the backline, where he used his explosive pace and blistering speed to accelerate out of defence on numerous occasions to turn defence into attack. His kicking improved out of sight, and this was recognised with a fifth placing in the Syd Barker Medal.

He is the brother of Joe Atley, who plays for the Essendon Football Club's VFL side after being delisted by the Port Adelaide Football Club.

Atley was delisted by North in October 2021 after 234 games for the club.
