= Hudson Kaak =

American football player (born 2001)

No. 14 – Auburn Tigers
- Position: Punter
- Class: Senior

Personal information
- Born: June 5, 2001 (age 25)
- Listed height: 6 ft 1 in (1.85 m)
- Listed weight: 222 lb (101 kg)

Career information
- High school: Seymour College (Victoria, Australia)
- College: Oklahoma State (2023–2024); Auburn (2025–present)
- Stats at ESPN

Hudson Kaak (born July 5, 2001) is an Australian college football punter for the Auburn Tigers. He previously played for the Oklahoma State Cowboys, and played Australian rules football for the Murray Bushrangers.

== College football career ==
=== Oklahoma State ===
Kaak moved to the United States and signed with Oklahoma State in December 2022. He expressed his excitement with the opportunity. During 2023, he played in 13 of 14 games, punting the ball 38 times throughout the season.

He punted 30 times in 2024, averaging 43 yards per punt. In his Oklahoma State career, he had six punts travel over thirty yards. Kaak entered the transfer portal in December 2024.

=== Auburn ===
Kaak committed to Auburn on December 14, 2024.

== Australian rules football career ==
Kaak played for the Murray Bushrangers in the NAB League. He trained at ProKick Australia.
