= Derek Murray (Australian footballer) =

Australian rules footballer

Personal information
- Full name: Derek Murray
- Born: 25 March 1980 (age 46)
- Original team: Murray Bushrangers
- Draft: 54th, 1998 AFL draft
- Height: 173 cm (5 ft 8 in)
- Weight: 70 kg (154 lb)

Playing career^{1}
| Years | Club | Games (Goals) |
| 1999–2002 | Port Adelaide | 23 (7) |
- ^{1} Playing statistics correct to the end of 2002.

Derek Murray (born 25 March 1980) is a former Australian rules footballer who played with Port Adelaide in the Australian Football League (AFL).

Murray was a highly successful junior, playing with the Murray Bushrangers in the TAC Cup in 1997 and 1998. He won a Morrish Medal is the first of those years and in 1998 he took home the Hunter Harrison Medal due to his carnival performance with the NSW/ACT Rams.

Selected by Port Adelaide in the 1998 AFL draft, Murray was used as a winger, rover and small forward. He made 11 appearances in 2000, his best return, but did not do enough to cement his spot in the team for 2001. However, late in the 2001 AFL season, Murray made a return to the side and after six home and away matches was picked in a qualifying final. Murray played the first two rounds in 2002 but did not make any further appearances and was delisted at the end of the year.

An Indigenous Australian, he is the brother of former St Kilda player Allan Murray. His daughter Emilia Makris is a Adelaide United FC soccer player.
