= Alipate Carlile =

Australian rules footballer

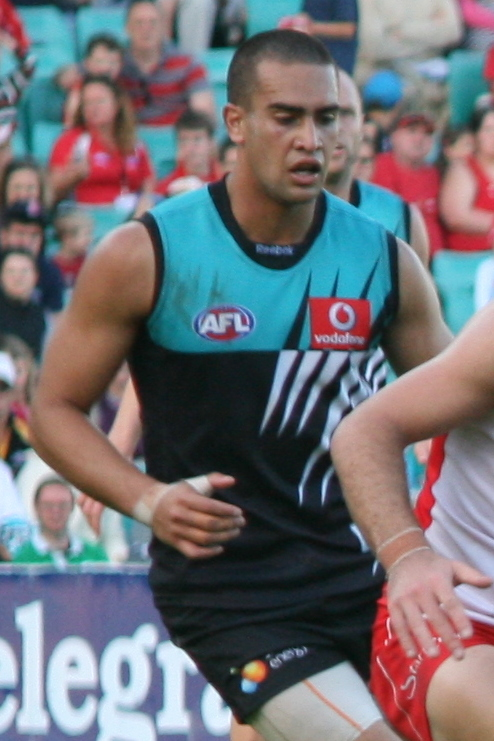
- Carlile with Port Adelaide in 2009

Personal information
- Nicknames: Bobby, Pate
- Born: 30 April 1987 (age 39); Lautoka, Fiji
- Original teams: Wangaratta Rovers; Murray Bushrangers
- Draft: 2005: Pick 44 (Port Adelaide)
- Height: 192 cm (6 ft 4 in)
- Weight: 98 kg (216 lb)
- Position: Defender

Playing career^{1}
Years	Club	Games (Goals)
2006–2016	Port Adelaide	167 (5)
- ^{1} Playing statistics correct to the end of 2016.

Career highlights
- 2008 AFL Rising Star nominee

Alipate Carlile (born 30 April 1987) is a former professional Australian rules footballer for who played for the Port Adelaide Football Club in the Australian Football League (AFL).

Carlile was born in Lautoka to mother Asenaca of Batiki. He was brought to Australia at the age of one. Carlile is a cousin of former Australian rules footballer David Rodan.

Carlile often played basketball and soccer as a junior before beginning his Australian rules career in his home town with the Wangaratta Rovers. The big-bodied 192 cm and 98 kg Carlile was selected by Port Adelaide at pick 44 in the 2005 AFL draft from the Murray Bushrangers.

Carlile is married to ex Adelaide Thunderbird netballer Joanna Sutton.

== AFL career ==
=== 2006–2007 ===
He made his Australian Football League debut in round 16, 2006 in the match against St Kilda at Aurora Stadium.

In 2007, he played his first game for the year in round 14, playing seven consecutive games in a relatively successful Port Adelaide team. He then played in the round 22 match, and the first week of the finals, but was dropped for the preliminary final in favour of experienced player Darryl Wakelin.

=== 2008–2016 ===
2008 was Carlile's break out season, playing all 22 games in the season, a first for Carlile. He quickly become a stalwart in defence for his tight checking role and ability to run forward of the play. He averaged 13 disposals, five marks and two tackles. He was recognised with the Gavin Wanganeen Medal. In 2010, he came third in the John Cahill Medal.

Carlile's 2015 season was hampered and then abbreviated by an ongoing hip injury. He played just 12 games, the last of which was in round 14, his lowest tally in a season since 2007. He did however manage to poll the first Brownlow votes of his career [2 votes] after an outstanding display against Hawthorn [round 4] in which he kept Jarryd Roughead goalless to be a key player in Port's win against Hawthorn.

At the conclusion of the 2016 season, he announced his retirement.
