= Allan Murray (Australian footballer) =

Australian rules footballer (born 1982)

Personal information
- Born: 20 May 1982 (age 44)
- Original team: Lavington / Murray U18
- Debut: Round 19, 10 August 2002, Port Adelaide vs. Carlton, at Optus Oval
- Height: 180 cm (5 ft 11 in)
- Weight: 83 kg (183 lb)

Playing career^{1}
Years	Club	Games (Goals)
2001–2002	Port Adelaide	1 (0)
2003–2006	St Kilda	15 (13)
Total		16 (13)
- ^{1} Playing statistics correct to the end of 2006.

Allan Murray (born 20 May 1982) is a former professional Australian rules footballer who played with both Port Adelaide and St Kilda in the Australian Football League. Murray is the brother of former Port Adelaide player Derek and the cousin of former Essendon player Nathan Lovett-Murray.

He was recruited as the number 35 draft pick in the 2000 AFL draft from Lavington. He made his debut for Port Adelaide in Round 19, 2002 against Carlton.

He was traded to St Kilda and put on their rookie list at the end of the 2002 season. He was then elevated from the rookie list later that year and made his debut for the Saints in Round 10 of the 2003 season, scoring four goals against Hawthorn.

Despite his impressive debut for the Saints, Murray's playing opportunities with the club were limited. He was delisted by St Kilda at the end of the 2006 season, after playing 15 games for the club in four seasons.

During his time at St Kilda Murray also played with affiliate team Springvale in the VFL and during his time at Port Adelaide he played with South Adelaide in the SANFL.

== Local football career ==
Following a 16-game AFL career with St Kilda, Murray continued his football journey at local level, making a strong impact with the Balwyn Tigers in the Eastern Football League. Murray joined the club alongside former Saints teammate Brett Moyle and assistant coach Mick McGuane, bringing top-tier experience and leadership to the group.

He made an immediate impression at Balwyn, claiming the 'Best and Fairest' award in 2007, his debut season with the club. He won four premierships and played 150 games with Balwyn. He played a pivotal role in the club's first Eastern Football League (EFL) Division 1 premiership in 2008, contributing to their victory over Vermont in the grand final.

== Unity Foundation ==
Along with Australian rules footballer Xavier Clarke, who also played St Kilda, Murray formed a not-for-profit charity, Unity Foundation, to look after homeless and disadvantaged indigenous youth. The foundation's programs were designed to help young people understand the lasting impact of their decisions. At its peak, Unity had strong ties to the professional sporting world, with active involvement from players at St Kilda, Essendon, and the Melbourne Storm. The initiative also partnered with RMIT University to provide formal training for athletes involved in the program.

== Career after football ==
Murray is an advocate for the empowerment and cultural inclusion of Indigenous Australians. Following his football career, he served as a Senior Adviser to the Victorian Minister for Aboriginal Affairs, where he worked to influence policy and strengthen community outcomes. He also led Indigenous Participation and Outcomes at a global engineering company, where he focused on integrating traditional knowledge and cultural design into major infrastructure projects.

He owns a large Indigenous civil supply business, Cable Containment Services.

Murray has also returned to Moorabbin, working as the Aboriginal & Torres Strait Islander Program Manager for St Kilda Football Club.
