= Robert Campbell (Australian footballer) =

Australian rules footballer (born 1982)

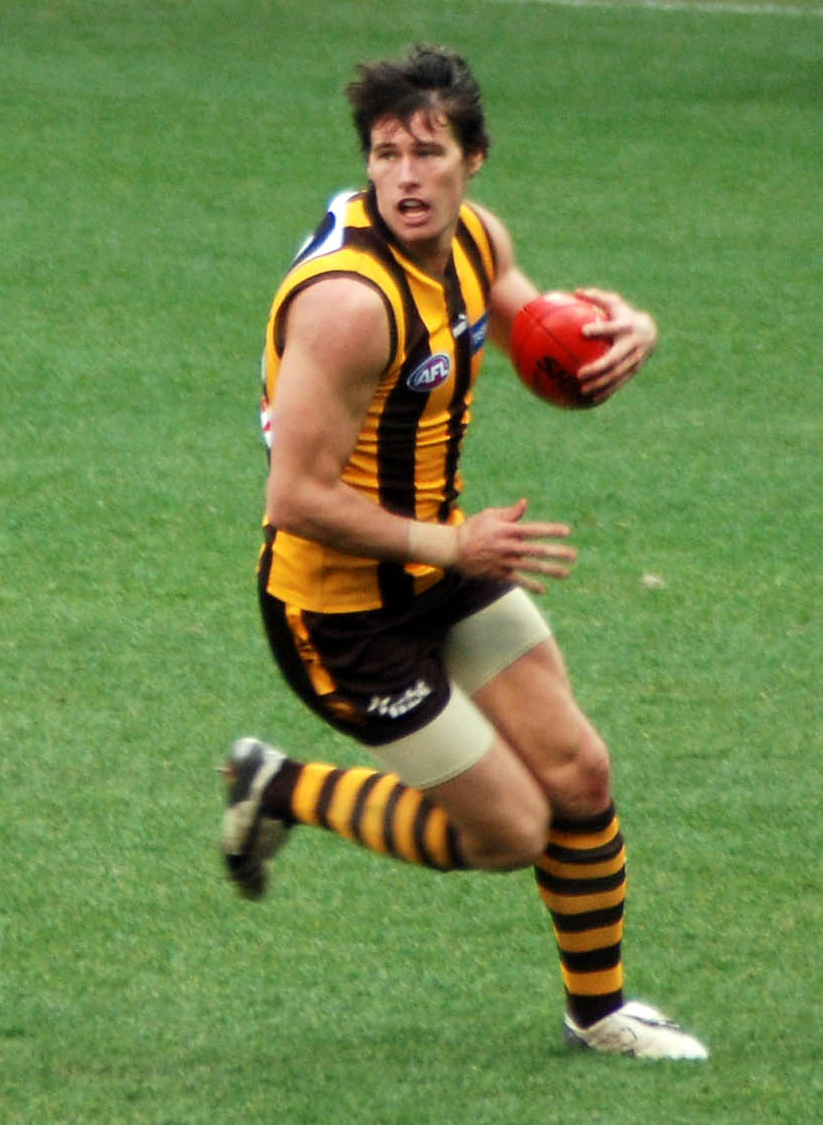
- Campbell playing for Hawthorn in 2008

Personal information
- Full name: Robert Campbell
- Born: 2 June 1982 (age 44)
- Original teams: Murray Bushrangers (TAC Cup); Rutherglen (Juniors)
- Draft: No. 27, 2001 rookie draft
- Debut: Round 5, 2002, Hawthorn vs. Richmond, at Melbourne Cricket Ground
- Height: 199 cm (6 ft 6 in)
- Weight: 125 kg (276 lb)
- Position: Ruckman

Playing career^{1}
Years	Club	Games (Goals)
2002–2009	Hawthorn	116 (25)
2011	Melbourne	0 (0)
- ^{1} Playing statistics correct to the end of 2011.

Career highlights
- AFL premiership player: 2008; VFL premiership player: 2001

Robert "Robbie" Campbell (born 2 June 1982) is an Australian rules footballer who played for the Hawthorn Football Club and Melbourne Football Club in the Australian Football League (AFL).

== Career ==
At 200 cm tall, he made his AFL debut with the Hawthorn Hawks in 2002. After appearing sporadically in his first few seasons, Campbell starred in 2006 with 230 disposals and 300 hit outs, playing in each of the club's 22 games.

In 2007, he became the Hawks' number one ruckman after Peter Everitt's departure to the Sydney Swans. He played in every game for the season, including two finals appearances.

Campbell has a reputation for providing value around the ground with his strength and tenacious attitude. Campbell was rewarded for his efforts with a Premiership medallion after the Hawks upset Geelong in the 2008 Grand Final. He finished 13th in the Peter Crimmins Medal count in both 2007 and 2008.

Campbell played as the primary ruckman for Hawthorn and was a member of the premiership-winning squad.

=== Retirement ===
Robbie announced his retirement at the 2009 Hawthorn Peter Crimmins Medal Count on 3 October due to a knee injury. A tearful Campbell thanked fans, players, his family and coaching staff in a heartfelt speech.

=== Comeback ===
He returned to football in 2010 playing in finals and including 8 games for the Box Hill Hawks in the Victorian Football League (VFL).

Campbell was selected by the Melbourne Demons during round 5 at pick number 63 in the 2011 Rookie Draft. Due to Melbourne's strong ruck depth in 2011, notably Mark Jamar, Campbell was unable to break into Melbourne's senior team. As a result, he retired at the end of the season.

== Statistics ==
Legend
G	Goals	K	Kicks	D	Disposals	T	Tackles
B	Behinds	H	Handballs	M	Marks	H/O	Hit-outs

Season	Team	No.	Games	Totals								Averages (per game)								Votes
Season	Team	No.	Games	G	B	K	H	D	M	T	H/O	G	B	K	H	D	M	T	H/O	Votes
2002	Hawthorn	39	7	0	0	27	19	46	14	24	60	0.0	0.0	3.9	2.7	6.6	2.0	3.4	8.6	0
2003	Hawthorn	39	10	0	1	29	24	53	16	23	130	0.0	0.1	2.9	2.4	5.3	1.6	2.3	13.0	0
2004	Hawthorn	39	14	1	0	28	40	68	17	24	121	0.1	0.0	2.0	2.9	4.9	1.2	1.7	8.6	0
2005	Hawthorn	39	1	0	0	1	3	4	0	4	18	0.0	0.0	1.0	3.0	4.0	0.0	4.0	18.0	0
2006	Hawthorn	39	22	10	6	82	148	230	75	56	300	0.5	0.3	3.7	6.7	10.5	3.4	2.5	13.6	0
2007	Hawthorn	39	24	6	2	70	173	243	71	54	385	0.3	0.1	2.9	7.2	10.1	3.0	2.3	16.0	0
2008^{#}	Hawthorn	39	24	7	1	93	160	253	84	55	358	0.3	0.0	3.9	6.7	10.5	3.5	2.3	14.9	0
2009	Hawthorn	39	14	1	0	38	98	136	35	23	94	0.1	0.0	2.7	7.0	9.7	2.5	1.6	6.7	0
2011	Melbourne	26	0	—	—	—	—	—	—	—	—	—	—	—	—	—	—	—	—	0
Career			116	25	10	368	665	1033	312	263	1466	0.2	0.1	3.2	5.7	8.9	2.7	2.3	12.6	0

== Honours and achievements ==
Team

- AFL premiership player (Hawthorn): 2008
- VFL premiership player (Box Hill): 2001

Individual

- Box Hill All-Stars team (1999–2019)
