= Jordon Butts =

Australian rules footballer

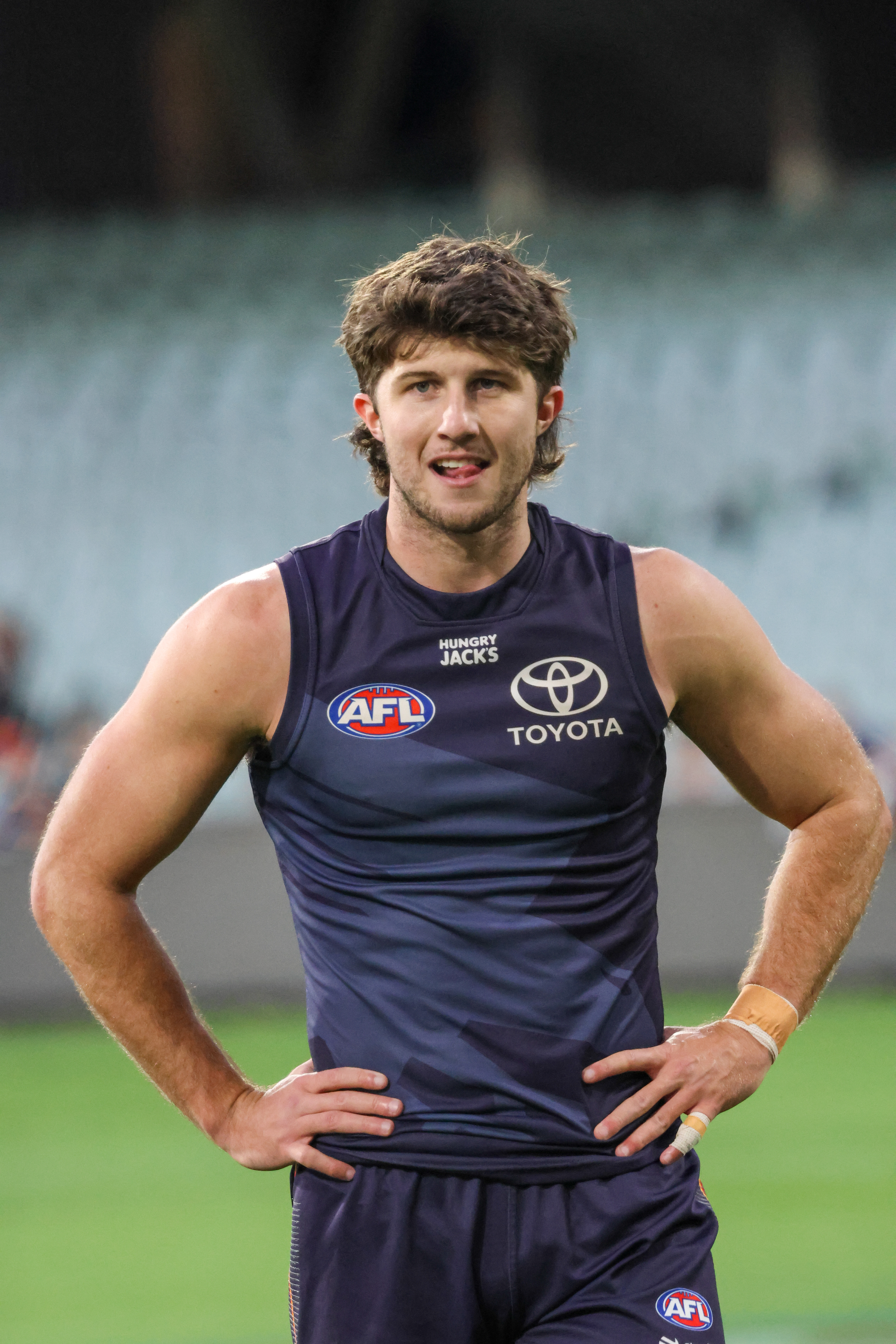
- Butts in 2026

Personal information
- Born: 31 December 1999 (age 26)
- Original team: Murray Bushrangers
- Draft: No. 39, 2019 rookie draft
- Debut: Round 13, 2020, Adelaide vs. Geelong, at Adelaide Oval
- Height: 198 cm (6 ft 6 in)
- Weight: 97 kg (214 lb)
- Position: Key defender

Club information
- Current club: Western Bulldogs

Playing career^{1}
Years	Club	Games (Goals)
2020–2026	Adelaide	94 (1)
2027–	Western Bulldogs	0 (0)
Total		94 (1)
- ^{1} Playing statistics correct to the end of round 22, 2026.

Jordon Butts (born 31 December 1999) is an Australian rules footballer who plays for the Western Bulldogs in the Australian Football League (AFL). He was recruited by the Adelaide Football Club with the 39th draft pick in the 2019 rookie draft. He is the son of former Carlton player Gerard Butts.

== Early football ==
Butts played for the Shepparton Football Club in the Goulburn Valley Football Netball League, where he played three games, one of them a premiership victory. He also played two games for the Werribee Football Club. Butts played 40 games for the Murray Bushrangers in the NAB League over three seasons spanning from 2016 to 2018. He kicked 25 goals during his time with the Bushrangers while playing a variety of positions. He came runner up in the club's best and fairest in the 2017 season. In 2017, Butts was selected to represent Vic Country at the AFL Under 18 Championships.

== AFL career ==
Butts debuted in Adelaide's 28 point loss to Geelong in Round 13 of the 2020 AFL season. On debut, Butts picked up eight disposals, three marks and a tackle. In only his third game of AFL, Butts was given the job against forward Tom Hawkins, the reigning Coleman Medalist. He managed to take ten disposals, and kept Hawkins to two goals.

Butts began 2026 strongly, stepping up in the absence of key defender Mark Keane. He made history in the round two loss to the Western Bulldogs when he kicked his first AFL career goal in his 87th game. Butts overtook Jake Kelly as the Crow with the most appearances before a first career goal. He thoroughly beat Bulldogs star Sam Darcy that night, holding him to a singular goal and taking a career-best 12 marks and 11 intercepts. Butts fell out of favour with team selection later in the year, and the out-of-contract defender garnered interest from rivals such as the Western Bulldogs.

Butts officially moved to the Bulldogs as a free agent at season's end.

== Statistics ==
Updated to the end of round 22, 2026.

Legend
G	Goals	K	Kicks	D	Disposals	T	Tackles
B	Behinds	H	Handballs	M	Marks

Season	Team	No.	Games	Totals							Averages (per game)							Votes
Season	Team	No.	Games	G	B	K	H	D	M	T	G	B	K	H	D	M	T	Votes
2020 (Note: The 2020 season was played with 17 home-and-away matches per team (down from 22) and 16-minute quarters with time on (down from 20-minute quarters with time on) due to the impact of the COVID-19 pandemic.)	Adelaide	41	2	0	0	8	6	14	5	2	0.0	0.0	4.0	3.0	7.0	2.5	1.0	0
2021	Adelaide	41	22	0	0	151	80	231	84	30	0.0	0.0	6.9	3.6	10.5	3.8	1.4	0
2022	Adelaide	41	19	0	0	99	82	181	63	15	0.0	0.0	5.2	4.3	9.5	3.3	0.8	0
2023	Adelaide	41	17	0	0	85	58	143	56	16	0.0	0.0	5.0	3.4	8.4	3.3	0.9	0
2024	Adelaide	41	15	0	0	83	68	151	64	15	0.0	0.0	5.5	4.5	10.1	4.3	1.0	0
2025	Adelaide	41	10	0	0	43	21	64	31	2	0.0	0.0	4.3	2.1	6.4	3.1	0.2	0
2026	Adelaide	41	9	1	1	57	44	101	40	5	0.1	0.1	6.3	4.9	11.2	4.4	0.6	0
Career			94	1	1	526	359	885	343	85	0.0	0.0	5.6	3.8	9.4	3.6	0.9	0
