= Todd Marshall =

Australian rules footballer

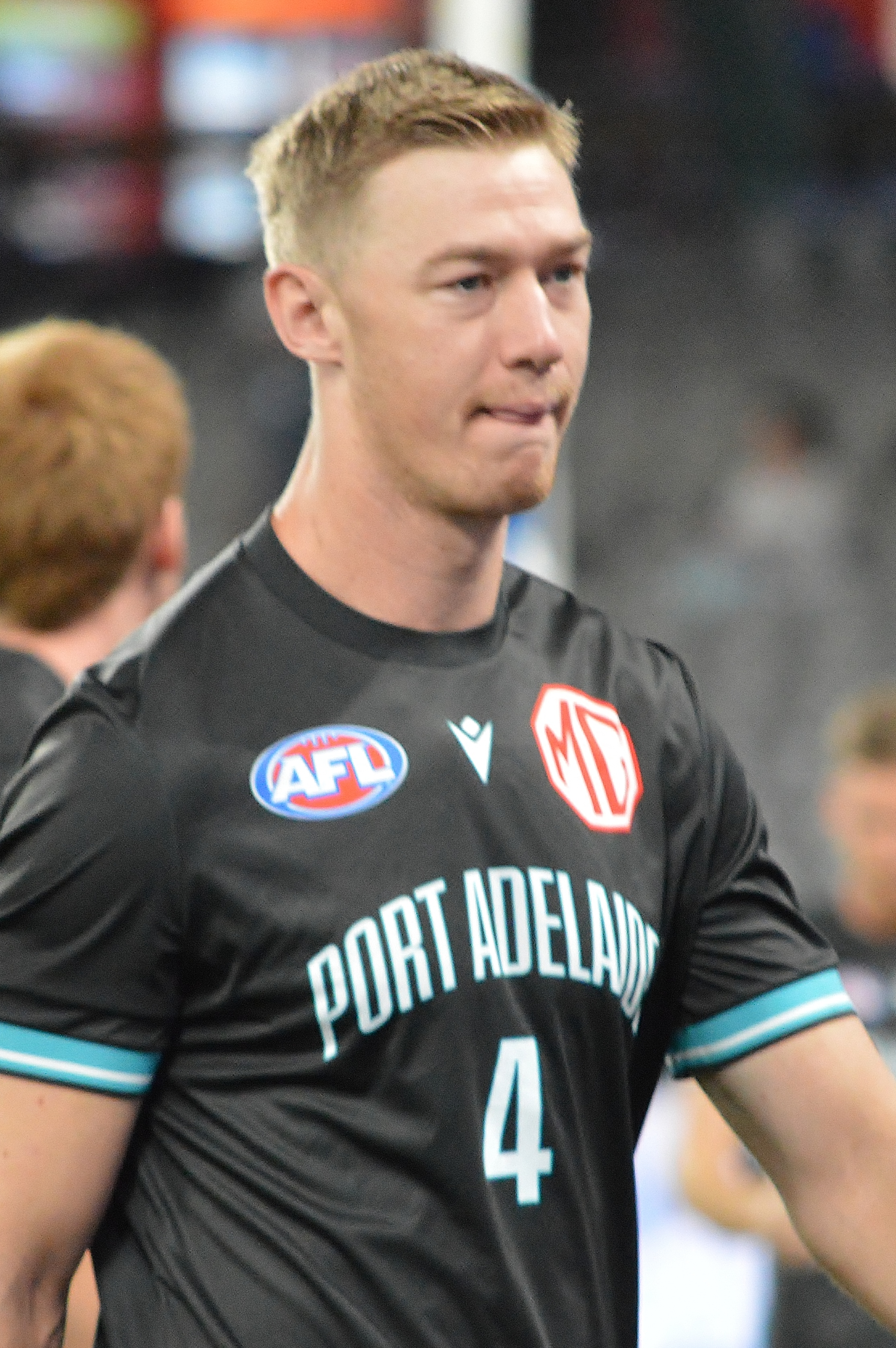
- Marshall in March 2026

Personal information
- Full name: Todd Marshall
- Nickname: Toddy
- Born: 8 October 1998 (age 28)
- Original team: Murray Bushrangers (TAC Cup)
- Draft: No. 16, 2016 national draft
- Debut: Round 22, 2017, Western Bulldogs vs. Port Adelaide, at Mars Stadium
- Height: 198 cm (6 ft 6 in)
- Weight: 92 kg (203 lb)
- Position: Key forward

Club information
- Current club: Port Adelaide
- Number: 4

Playing career^{1}
Years	Club	Games (Goals)
2017–	Port Adelaide	131 (167)
- ^{1} Playing statistics correct to the end of the 2026 season.

Career highlights
- Port Adelaide leading goalkicker (2022)

Todd Marshall (born 8 October 1998) is an Australian rules footballer playing for the Port Adelaide Football Club in the Australian Football League (AFL). He is a tall key-position player.

== Early life and junior football ==
Marshall grew up in Deniliquin, New South Wales. As a teenager he was a talented cricket player, touring England with NSW youth teams. He made the decision to focus on football at a relatively late age. He played his first junior and senior football with the Deniliquin Football Club. His first full TAC Cup season with the Murray Bushrangers was in 2016. Marshall also represented NSW/ACT at the 2016 AFL Under 18 Championships. He fell into Greater Western Sydney Giants' recruitment zone in the Riverina and was briefly part of its academy, but in May 2016 the AFL ruled that Marshall had not spent enough time at the club and thus would have to go through the normal draft process rather than going straight to GWS as an academy player.

== AFL career ==
Marshall was drafted by Port Adelaide with their first selection and sixteenth overall in the 2016 national draft. He made his debut in the seventeen-point win over the Western Bulldogs at Mars Stadium in round twenty-two of the 2017 season. Todd Marshall was good friends with Patrick Ryder during his tenure at Port Adelaide and when the latter was traded to St Kilda at the end of the 2019 AFL season the former changed his guernsey number from 13 to 4.

The 2022 season proved to be Marshall's best yet, playing in 21 of 22 games and kicking a career high 45 goals to be Port Adelaide's leading goalkicker.

== Personal life ==
Marshall lost both of his parents within six months at the age of 19.

== Statistics ==
Updated to the end of round 22, 2026.

Legend
G	Goals	K	Kicks	D	Disposals	T	Tackles
B	Behinds	H	Handballs	M	Marks

Season	Team	No.	Games	Totals							Averages (per game)							Votes
Season	Team	No.	Games	G	B	K	H	D	M	T	G	B	K	H	D	M	T	Votes
2017	Port Adelaide	13	3	1	2	15	11	26	10	10	0.3	0.7	5.0	3.7	8.7	3.3	3.3	0
2018	Port Adelaide	13	7	11	7	40	20	60	16	12	1.6	1.0	5.7	2.9	8.6	2.3	1.7	0
2019	Port Adelaide	13	10	10	4	68	26	94	35	23	1.0	0.4	6.8	2.6	9.4	3.5	2.3	0
2020 (Note: The 2020 season was played with 17 home-and-away matches per team (down from 22) and 16-minute quarters with time on (down from 20-minute quarters with time on) due to the impact of the COVID-19 pandemic.)	Port Adelaide	4	14	11	9	84	27	111	41	35	0.8	0.6	6.0	1.9	7.9	2.9	2.5	0
2021	Port Adelaide	4	21	24	12	159	55	214	85	27	1.1	0.6	7.6	2.6	10.2	4.0	1.3	0
2022	Port Adelaide	4	21	45	15	188	37	225	116	46	2.1	0.7	9.0	1.8	10.7	5.5	2.2	3
2023	Port Adelaide	4	21	36	16	155	41	196	103	48	1.7	0.8	7.4	2.0	9.3	4.9	2.3	1
2024	Port Adelaide	4	19	21	18	136	37	173	91	29	1.1	0.9	7.2	1.9	9.1	4.8	1.5	4
2025	Port Adelaide	4	0	—	—	—	—	—	—	—	—	—	—	—	—	—	—	0
2026	Port Adelaide	4	13	7	6	106	24	130	60	20	0.5	0.5	8.2	1.8	10.0	4.6	1.5	0
Career			129	166	89	951	278	1229	557	250	1.3	0.7	7.4	2.2	9.5	4.3	1.9	8
