= Daniel Howe =

Australian rules footballer

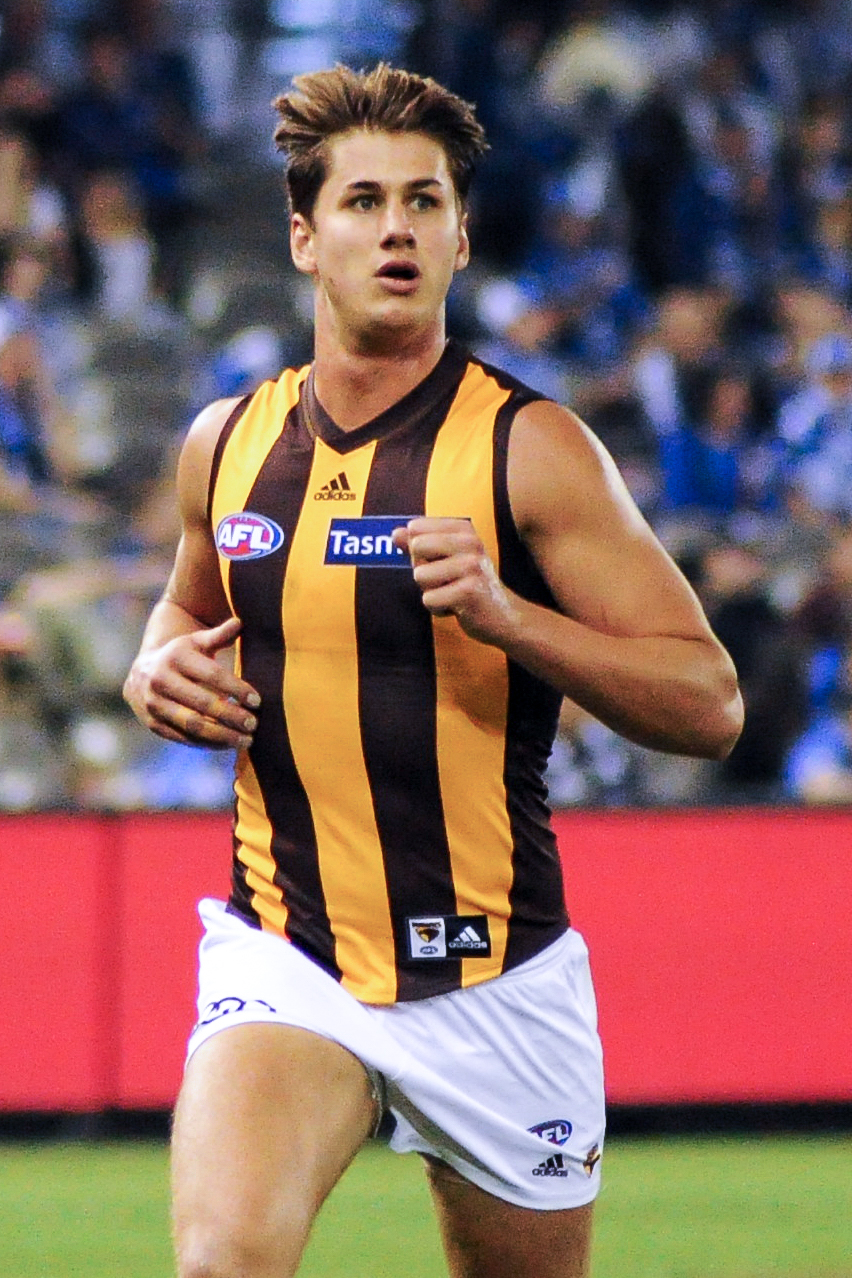
- Howe playing for Hawthorn in April 2018

Personal information
- Full name: Daniel Howe
- Nickname: Howie
- Born: 4 December 1995 (age 30)
- Original team: Murray Bushrangers/Xavier College/Rennie Football Club
- Draft: No. 31, 2014 national draft
- Debut: Round 9, 2015, Hawthorn vs. Gold Coast, at Aurora Stadium
- Height: 193 cm (6 ft 4 in)
- Weight: 88 kg (194 lb)
- Position: Defender / Midfielder

Playing career^{1}
Years	Club	Games (Goals)
2015–2022	Hawthorn	96 (22)
2023	North Melbourne	11 (2)
Total		107 (24)
- ^{1} Playing statistics correct to the end of 2023.

Daniel Howe (born 4 December 1995) is a former Australian rules footballer who played for the Hawthorn Football Club and North Melbourne Football Club in the Australian Football League (AFL).

== Early career ==
Growing up in Yarrawonga, Howe joined his elder brother and played most of his junior years playing for Rennie. Howe spent his schooling as a boarder at Xavier College, he would often go home and play with Rennie in the Hume Football League.

== AFL career ==
=== Hawthorn (2015–2022) ===
After Hawthorn won the 2014 premiership the Hawthorn recruitment officer concentrated on the younger players in the 2014 AFL draft. Howe was drafted in the 2nd round at No. 31.

A mobile defender, Howe made his AFL debut in the ninth round of the 2015 season. On a wet day in Launceston he was named as substitute, replacing Cyril Rioli at three quarter time.

In November 2015, Howe extended his contract to play for Hawthorn for an additional two years.

In July 2018, Howe received a five-game ban for his conduct in a Round 18 game against Carlton. He was given a two-game ban for striking Patrick Cripps and a three-game ban for a tripping incident that left Zac Fisher with a broken leg.

On 30 October 2018, Howe signed a two-year deal with Hawthorn.

After 96 games, Howe was told he would not be offered a new contract for 2023 season and was subsequently delisted by Hawthorn.

=== North Melbourne (2023) ===
Howe was selected by North Melbourne in the 2023 rookie draft with selection 33. Ironically, he played his first game with his new club against his old club in Launceston, Tasmania. He played his hundredth professional game at the Gather Round tournament in South Australia against the Brisbane Lions. After eleven games with North, Howe was delisted at the end of the 2023 season.

Since being delisted Howe completed his Bachelors of Arts degree and has played for Yarrawonga in the Ovens and Murray Football League.

== Statistics ==
Updated to the end of the 2023 season.

Legend
G	Goals	K	Kicks	D	Disposals	T	Tackles
B	Behinds	H	Handballs	M	Marks

Season	Team	No.	Games	Totals							Averages (per game)							Votes
Season	Team	No.	Games	G	B	K	H	D	M	T	G	B	K	H	D	M	T	Votes
2015	Hawthorn	41	4	0	1	28	23	51	20	11	0.0	0.3	7.0	5.8	12.8	5.0	2.8	0
2016	Hawthorn	41	11	1	2	96	60	156	40	50	0.1	0.2	8.7	5.5	14.2	3.6	4.6	0
2017	Hawthorn	17	18	5	2	151	149	300	72	96	0.3	0.1	8.4	8.3	16.7	4.0	5.3	0
2018	Hawthorn	17	17	4	2	165	138	303	80	82	0.2	0.1	9.7	8.1	17.8	4.7	4.8	0
2019	Hawthorn	17	12	1	2	111	83	194	53	44	0.1	0.2	9.3	6.9	16.2	4.4	3.7	0
2020 (Note: The 2020 season was played with 17 home-and-away matches per team (down from 22) and 16-minute quarters with time on (down from 20-minute quarters with time on) due to the impact of the COVID-19 pandemic.)	Hawthorn	17	5	2	0	36	17	53	16	5	0.4	0.0	7.2	3.4	10.6	3.2	1.0	0
2021	Hawthorn	17	20	8	5	249	124	373	109	40	0.4	0.3	12.5	6.2	18.7	5.5	2.0	0
2022	Hawthorn	17	9	1	1	74	50	124	40	16	0.1	0.1	8.2	5.6	13.8	4.4	1.8	0
2023	North Melbourne	15	11	2	1	107	53	160	40	24	0.2	0.1	9.7	4.8	14.5	3.6	2.2	0
Career			107	24	16	1017	697	1714	470	368	0.2	0.1	9.5	6.5	16.0	4.4	3.4	0

== Honours and achievements ==
Team

- Minor premiership (Box Hill): 2015

Individual

- Hawthorn best first year player (debut season): 2015
