= Marcus Drum =

Australian rules footballer, born 1987

Personal information
- Full name: Marcus James Drum
- Born: 1 May 1987 (age 39)
- Original team: Congupna Football Club (Murray Football League) Murray Bushrangers (TAC Cup)
- Draft: 1. 10, 2005 National Draft, Fremantle
- Height: 191 cm (6 ft 3 in)
- Weight: 87 kg (192 lb)
- Position: Defender

Playing career^{1}
Years	Club	Games (Goals)
2006–2009	Fremantle	22 (6)
2010-2011	Geelong	0 (0)
- ^{1} Playing statistics correct to the end of 2011.

Marcus James Drum (born 1 May 1987) is an Australian rules footballer who played in the Australian Football League (AFL) for the Fremantle Football Club between 2006 and 2009 before he was traded to Geelong during the 2009 trade week.

In July 2011 Geelong announced that Drum had retired due to ongoing injury problems. In October 2013 he joined Port Adelaide as a player welfare manager and was also the match day runner under coach Ken Hinkley.

Recruited from Congupna Football Club and the Murray Bushrangers, Drum is the nephew of former Geelong player, Fremantle coach and Victorian Nationals MLC Damian Drum. He is a nephew of champion Richmond player and coach Francis Bourke and cousin of Richmond and North Melbourne player David Bourke. He is also a cousin of Geelong and St Kilda player Steven King, through their mothers. In the 2005 National Draft, Drum was selected with the 10th overall draft pick.

== AFL career ==
=== Fremantle (2006–2009) ===
Drum played five games in the 2006 AFL season, and won Fremantle's Beacon Award for the best up-and-coming player at the club's Doig Medal dinner in October 2006.

He did not play until round 16 in the 2007 AFL season, when new coach Mark Harvey chose him in the squad to take on Adelaide at AAMI Stadium. In a win for Fremantle, he kicked 4 handy goals for the team. However, he only played two more matches for the season, against Geelong in round 17 and Port Adelaide in round 22. 2008 saw Drum play 9 games, his highest annual tally to date, including the final four matches. After playing in the opening round of the 2009 AFL season, Drum didn't return to the AFL until Round 19, when he again played the final four games. During the season his form for Perth in the WAFL was poor, but despite this he was a surprise selection for the last four games.

During the 2009 AFL trade week, Drum asked to be traded to Victoria and was traded to Geelong for a third round draft pick, number 49 overall.

=== Geelong (2010–2011) ===
Due to a succession of injuries, including a detached retina and injuries to his Achilles tendon and hamstring, Drum struggled to play regularly for Geelong's side in the Victorian Football League (VFL) and never made his senior debut for Geelong in the AFL. In the middle of the 2011 AFL season he announced his retirement from AFL football after only playing 6 games in two seasons in the VFL.

== Statistics ==
Legend
G	Goals	K	Kicks	D	Disposals	T	Tackles
B	Behinds	H	Handballs	M	Marks

Season	Team	No.	Games	Totals							Averages (per game)						
Season	Team	No.	Games	G	B	K	H	D	M	T	G	B	K	H	D	M	T
2006	Fremantle	30	5	1	1	32	19	51	18	13	0.2	0.2	6.4	3.8	10.2	3.6	2.6
2007	Fremantle	30	3	4	1	16	20	36	11	3	1.3	0.3	5.3	6.7	12.0	3.7	1.0
2008	Fremantle	30	9	1	0	75	64	139	55	22	0.1	0.0	8.3	7.1	15.4	6.1	2.4
2009	Fremantle	9	5	0	0	37	34	71	22	14	0.0	0.0	7.4	6.8	14.2	4.4	2.8
2010	Geelong	23	0	—	—	—	—	—	—	—	—	—	—	—	—	—	—
2011	Geelong	23	0	—	—	—	—	—	—	—	—	—	—	—	—	—	—
Career			22	6	2	160	137	297	106	52	0.3	0.1	7.3	6.2	13.5	4.8	2.4
