= James Cousins (footballer) =

Australian rules footballer (born 1998)

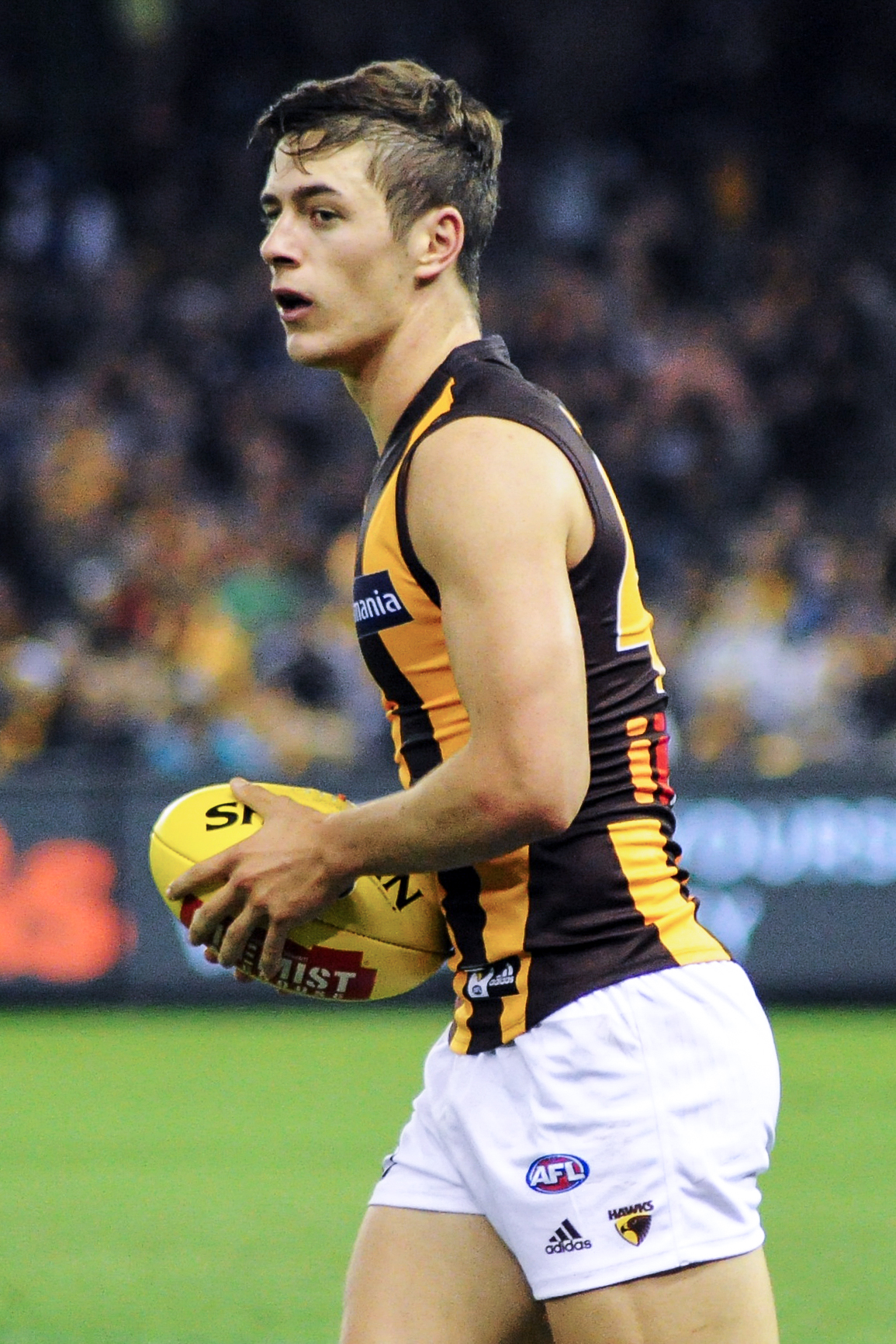
- Cousins playing for Hawthorn in April 2018

Personal information
- Full name: James Cousins
- Born: 19 March 1998 (age 28); Mansfield, Victoria
- Original teams: Mansfield, Murray Bushrangers
- Draft: No. 46, 2017 rookie draft
- Debut: Round 10, 2017, Hawthorn vs. Sydney, at Sydney Cricket Ground
- Height: 185 cm (6 ft 1 in)
- Weight: 80 kg (176 lb)
- Position: Midfielder

Playing career^{1}
Years	Club	Games (Goals)
2017–2021	Hawthorn	35 (12)
- ^{1} Playing statistics correct to the end of 2021.

Career highlights
- VFL premiership player: 2018

James Cousins (born 19 March 1998) is a professional Australian rules footballer who most recently played for the Hawthorn Football Club in the Australian Football League. James was born in small country town of Mansfield, Victoria.

Cousins won the Murray Bushrangers best and fairest award in 2016. He also played one match for Richmond's VFL side.

== AFL career ==
After being overlooked in the National draft, Cousins was picked by Hawthorn with their third selection and forty-sixth overall in the 2017 national rookie draft

A sequence of high possessions games playing for Box Hill gave the selectors notice that he was ready for the big league. Cousins was elevated off the rookie list when Cyril Rioli was put on the long-term injury list. He made his debut against Sydney on the SCG, he also kicked a goal .

On 9 July 2017, Cousins injured his shoulder whilst playing for Box Hill. Five days later, it was announced that Cousins required surgery and would miss the remainder of the 2017 season.

On 2 August 2017, Cousins signed a two-year rookie contract extension to stay at Hawthorn until the end of 2019.

Cousins was delisted by Hawthorn at the end of the 2021 season and was wished all the best for his future endeavours.

He started playing for Williamstown in the VFL after being delisted and made 8 appearances, kicking 2 goals, in an injury-interrupted 2022 season.

== Personal life ==
Cousins is currently studying a Bachelor of Commerce at Deakin University.

== Statistics ==
Statistics are correct to the end of 2021.

Legend
G	Goals	K	Kicks	D	Disposals	T	Tackles
B	Behinds	H	Handballs	M	Marks

Season	Team	No.	Games	Totals							Averages (per game)							Votes
Season	Team	No.	Games	G	B	K	H	D	M	T	G	B	K	H	D	M	T	Votes
2017	Hawthorn	46	3	1	0	22	17	39	5	13	0.3	0.0	7.3	5.7	13.0	1.7	4.3	0
2018	Hawthorn	46	4	0	0	24	27	51	13	11	0.0	0.0	6.0	6.8	12.8	3.3	2.8	0
2019	Hawthorn	46	12	8	4	129	90	219	51	33	0.7	0.3	10.8	7.5	18.3	4.3	2.8	0
2020 (Note: The 2020 season was played with 17 home-and-away matches per team (down from 22) and 16-minute quarters with time on (down from 20-minute quarters with time on) due to the impact of the COVID-19 pandemic.)	Hawthorn	46	6	1	3	60	57	117	20	16	0.2	0.5	10.0	9.5	19.5	3.3	2.7	0
2021	Hawthorn	24	10	2	5	101	86	187	27	37	0.2	0.5	10.1	8.6	18.7	2.7	3.7	0
Career			35	12	12	336	277	613	116	110	0.3	0.3	9.6	7.9	17.5	3.3	3.1	0

== Honours and achievements ==
Team

- VFL premiership player (Box Hill): 2018
