= Robert Forster-Knight =

Australian rules footballer

Personal information
- Born: 6 April 1982 (age 44)
- Original team: Murray Bushrangers
- Debut: 20 April 2001, Essendon vs. Sydney, at SCG
- Height: 186 cm (6 ft 1 in)
- Weight: 85 kg (187 lb)

Playing career^{1}
Years	Club	Games (Goals)
2001–2003	Essendon	31 (0)
2004–2005	Port Adelaide	0 (0)
- ^{1} Playing statistics correct to the end of 2003.

Robert Forster-Knight (born 6 April 1982) is a former Australian rules footballer.

== Early life ==
Forster-Knight played for the Murray Bushrangers from 1998 to 1999, being named in the Bushrangers' team of the decade for the 1990s.

== AFL career ==
He was drafted by the Essendon Football Club in the 1999 National draft at pick 72 in the fifth round. He played 31 games, including one final, with Essendon before being delisted after the 2003 season. He was noted for a central performance in Essendon's round 10 victory over West Coast in the 2003 season. and being one of a select group of AFL footballers never to have lost to the Hawthorn Football Club.

Port Adelaide picked him with pick 39 in the 2003 National draft, but he did not play any senior games for the club and was delisted after the 2004 season. He was drafted with the Port Adelaide's second pick in the rookie draft for the 2005 season, and delisted for a third time at the end of that season.

He worked from 2011 to 2018 as a recruiting officer for the Essendon Football Club, where he was noted for using his experience with sports science as part of his job. In August 2018, he was promoted to be Essendon's National Recruiting Manager, a position he still holds as of May 2020.

== Personal life ==
While a player at Essendon, Forster-Knight was taking a course in Marketing.
