= Kayne Pettifer =

Australian rules footballer, born 1982

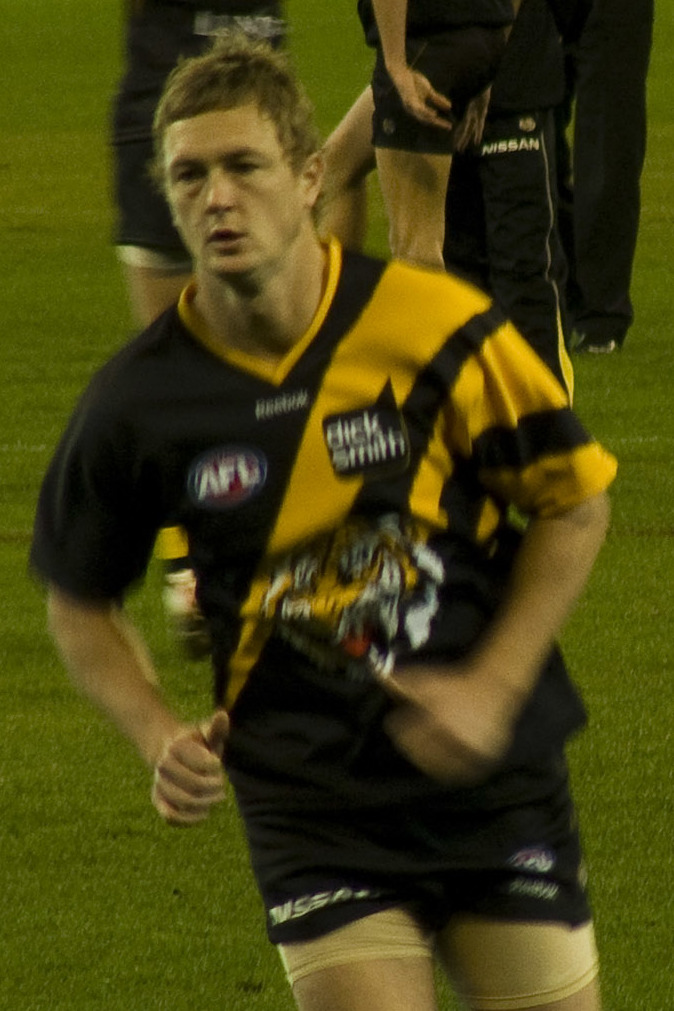
- Pettifer in May 2009

Personal information
- Full name: Kayne Pettifer
- Born: 22 January 1982 (age 44); Victoria
- Original teams: Kyabram (GVFL); Murray Bushrangers (TAC Cup)
- Draft: No. 9, 2000 national draft
- Height: 183 cm (6 ft 0 in)
- Weight: 81 kg (179 lb)
- Position: Forward

Playing career^{1}
Years	Club	Games (Goals)
2001–2009	Richmond	113 (132)
- ^{1} Playing statistics correct to the end of 2007.

Career highlights
- Larke Medal 2000

Kayne Pettifer (born 22 January 1982) is a former professional Australian rules footballer who played for the Richmond Football Club in the Australian Football League (AFL).

Pettifer first attracted the talent scouts when he was awarded the Larke Medal for his outstanding performance during the Australian Vic Country's Under 18 team at the 2000 AFL Under 18 Championships. Later in the 2000 National AFL draft Kayne Pettifer was selected by the Richmond Football Club at number 9 overall, which was unexpected for such a short forward. For the next four years Kayne Pettifer had sporadic form rarely playing more than nine games a year. In 2005, however, Kayne Pettifer played a very different role. He lined up to play in all 22 games and was the Tigers third highest goal kicker (31). He also led the side for inside 50's cementing himself into Richmond's top 22.

In 2006, he established himself as a high flyer, capable of taking a spectacular mark, with an unprecedented three consecutive winning nominations for the Mark of the Year. He signed a contract extension in 2006, taking him up to the end of 2008. He finished top 5 in Richmond's Best and Fairest in 2006 and continued his form into 2007.

In 2008, he had a bad start to the season, being suspended. It got worse, when he required a full knee reconstruction. This opened the door for other players to take his position. He was a chance to be delisted but coach Terry Wallace kept on him on for the 2009 season.

In 2009 he managed only four games for the season and badly injured his knee again in a VFL match. His father died in a car crash in August. Then Richmond delisted Pettifer on 30 October.

Pettifer returned to his home town club, Kyabram, for the 2010 season. He was one of the leagues leading goal kickers.

In 2011 he played half a season in the WAFL for East Perth before returning to Victoria and playing in former teammate Troy Simmonds Montrose side in the Eastern Football League.

Pettifer then became a high-profile recruit for Montmorency in the Northern Football League for season 2012. Pettifer made his Montmorency debut on 14 April 2012 with a nine-goal haul in the Magpies win over Macleod.
