= Rory Hilton =

Australian rules footballer

Personal information
- Born: 15 April 1979 (age 47); Wodonga, Victoria
- Original team: Murray Bushrangers (TAC Cup)
- Debut: Round 6, 1 May 1998, Brisbane Lions vs. Richmond, at Gabba
- Height: 182 cm (6 ft 0 in)
- Weight: 96 kg (212 lb)

Playing career^{1}
Years	Club	Games (Goals)
1998	Brisbane Lions	9 (3)
1999–2005	Richmond	82 (53)
Total		91 (56)
- ^{1} Playing statistics correct to the end of 2005.

Rory Hilton (born 15 April 1979) is a former Australian rules footballer who played for the Brisbane Lions and Richmond in the Australian Football League (AFL).

== Overview ==
Drafted at no.3 in the 1996 AFL draft, there were big raps on Hilton as a quality key position player. Recruited from Murray Bushrangers, at the time of the draft Hilton was recovering from injuring his ACL, the fact he would not be available to play in 1997 did not stop him being selected by the Brisbane Lions. He played just 9 games with them in 2 seasons (making his debut in 1998), before requesting a trade closer to home. A trade was arranged with the Richmond Football Club.

While there he suffered a spate of injuries and only managed 82 games there over 7 seasons. He was delisted at the end of 2005, at the age of only 26.

After briefly returning home to play for Euroa, in the Goulburn Valley Football League, Rory returned to Melbourne to play with Old Camberwell Grammarians Football Club. Playing as a key forward, Rory played a pivotal role in Camberwell's 2007 premiership team helping to elevate the club to 'B' section of the Victorian Amateur Football Association (VAFA).

Rory recently completed a Bachelor of Applied Science (Property) at RMIT, Melbourne. He also commenced employment with valuations firm m3property.
