= Craig Ednie =

Australian rules footballer

Personal information
- Full name: Craig Ednie
- Born: 16 February 1982 (age 44)
- Original team: Yarrawonga
- Height: 172 cm (5 ft 8 in)
- Weight: 71 kg (157 lb)

Playing career^{1}
| Years | Club | Games (Goals) |
| 2002 | Richmond | 7 (3) |
- ^{1} Playing statistics correct to the end of 2002.

Craig Ednie (born 16 February 1982) is an Australian rules footballer who played with Richmond in the Australian Football League (AFL).

Ednie, who Richmond secured in the 2000 rookie draft, played just one season of senior AFL football. He had 17 disposals and kicked a goal on his debut, against Melbourne at Docklands. After adding just six more appearances, he was delisted by Richmond at the end of the 2002 season.

He has since been an important figure at Ovens & Murray Football League side Yarrawonga, where he had started his career. In 2006, a premiership year for the club, Ednie won the O&MFNL best and fairest award, the Morris Medal. He was Yarrawonga's playing coach in their 2009 and 2010 grand final losses to Albury.

Ednie was captain-coach of Rennie's 2017 and 2018 Picola & District Football League premierships.
