= Ben Mathews =

Australian rules footballer, born 1978

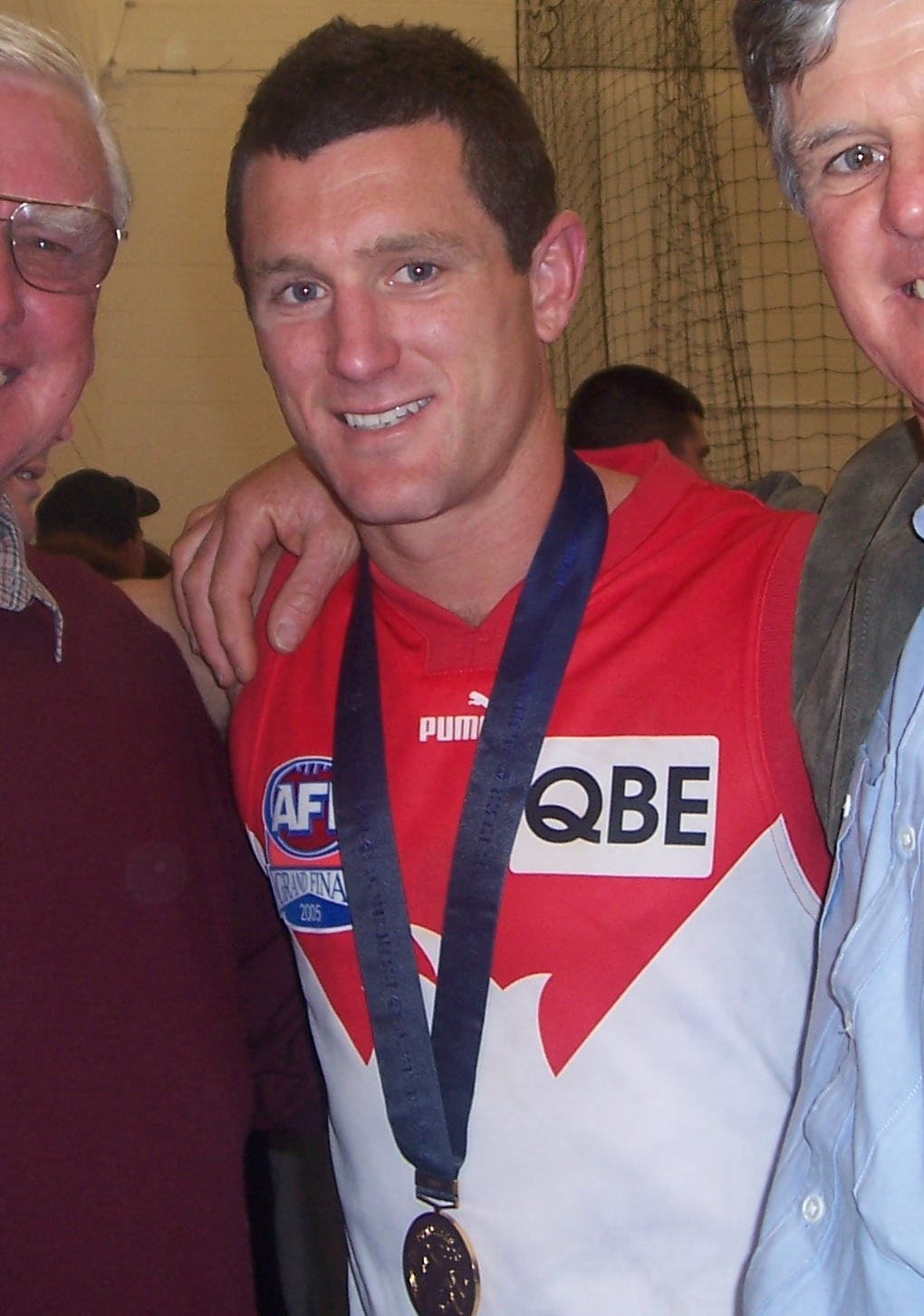

Personal information
- Full name: Ben Mathews
- Born: 29 November 1978 (age 47)
- Original teams: Hopefield Buraja, Corowa Rutherglen
- Height: 181 cm (5 ft 11 in)
- Weight: 86 kg (190 lb)

Playing career^{1}
Years	Club	Games (Goals)
1997–2008	Sydney	198 (45)
- ^{1} Playing statistics correct to the end of 2008.

Career highlights
- AFL premiership player: 2005; AFL Rising Star nominee: 1999

Ben Mathews (born 29 November 1978) is a former Australian rules footballer who played for the Sydney Swans in the Australian Football League (AFL). Mathews originally played with Hopefield Buraja FC in the Coreen & District Football League, then was recruited from the Corowa Rutherglen of New South Wales, via the Murray Bushrangers.

He was part of the 2005 AFL premiership-winning side that defeated the West Coast Eagles. He announced his retirement on 2 September 2008.

He has served as the midfield coach of the Melbourne Football Club since September 2013 to end of 2020. He is now the assistant coach at Sydney Swans Football Club

== Statistics ==
Legend
G	Goals	K	Kicks	D	Disposals	T	Tackles
B	Behinds	H	Handballs	M	Marks

Season	Team	No.	Games	Totals							Averages (per game)						
Season	Team	No.	Games	G	B	K	H	D	M	T	G	B	K	H	D	M	T
1997	Sydney	36	4	1	0	18	13	31	3	5	0.3	0.0	4.5	3.3	7.8	0.8	1.3
1998	Sydney	36	0	—	—	—	—	—	—	—	—	—	—	—	—	—	—
1999	Sydney	36	17	4	0	122	82	204	47	16	0.2	0.0	7.2	4.8	12.0	2.8	0.9
2000	Sydney	36	22	2	4	270	164	434	102	30	0.1	0.2	12.3	7.5	19.7	4.6	1.4
2001	Sydney	4	23	4	2	264	146	410	113	46	0.2	0.1	11.5	6.3	17.8	4.9	2.0
2002	Sydney	4	21	4	1	211	150	361	66	65	0.2	0.0	10.0	7.1	17.2	3.1	3.1
2003	Sydney	4	23	4	0	237	152	389	94	59	0.2	0.0	10.3	6.6	16.9	4.1	2.6
2004	Sydney	4	24	6	8	239	204	443	109	94	0.3	0.3	10.0	8.5	18.5	4.5	3.9
2005	Sydney	4	25	6	4	200	161	361	77	75	0.2	0.2	8.0	6.4	14.4	3.1	3.0
2006	Sydney	4	14	5	2	83	77	160	44	37	0.4	0.1	5.9	5.5	11.4	3.1	2.6
2007	Sydney	4	23	8	2	168	137	305	89	67	0.3	0.1	7.3	6.0	13.3	3.9	2.9
2008	Sydney	4	2	1	1	12	11	23	9	4	0.5	0.5	6.0	5.5	11.5	4.5	2.0
Career			198	45	24	1824	1297	3121	753	498	0.2	0.1	9.2	6.6	15.8	3.8	2.5
