= List of AFL debuts in 2000 =

This is a listing of Australian rules footballers who made their senior debut for an Australian Football League (AFL) club in 2000.

Name	Club	Age at debut	Round debuted	Games (As of end of 2014)	Goals (As of end of 2014)	Notes
Michael Doughty	Adelaide	20 years, 255 days	6	231	46	
Robert Shirley	Adelaide	19 years, 290 days	3	151	28	
Rhett Biglands	Adelaide	22 years, 217 days	5	134	59	
Scott Welsh	Adelaide	21 years, 332 days	1	129	270	Previously played for North Melbourne.
Matthew Clarke	Adelaide	26 years, 175 days	1	118	19	Previously played for Brisbane.
Andrew Crowell	Adelaide	22 years, 209 days	1	44	15	
James Byrne	Adelaide	21 years, 323 days	1	24	4	
Ricky O'Loughlin	Adelaide	20 years, 279 days	5	9	2	Brother of Michael O'Loughlin.
Justin Cicolella	Adelaide	21 years, 195 days	3	5	1	
Jonathan Brown	Brisbane Lions	18 years, 162 days	5	256	594	Son of Brian Brown.
Aaron Shattock	Brisbane Lions	19 years, 342 days	5	57	15	
Craig Bolton	Brisbane Lions	19 years, 287 days	1	29	10	
Damian Cupido	Brisbane Lions	18 years, 71 days	11	13	16	
Trent Knobel	Brisbane Lions	20 years, 17 days	14	13	10	
Michael Martin	Brisbane Lions	23 years, 23 days	2	10	0	Previously played for Western Bulldogs.
Nathan Clarke	Brisbane Lions	20 years, 256 days	18	6	4	
Stefan Carey	Brisbane Lions	24 years, 48 days	1	3	1	Previously played for Sydney.
Shannon Rusca	Brisbane Lions	19 years, 218 days	3	2	0	
Ryan Houlihan	Carlton	18 years, 120 days	11	201	127	
Trent Hotton	Carlton	26 years, 103 days	1	61	36	Previously played for Collingwood
Michael Mansfield	Carlton	28 years, 218 days	1	54	18	Previously played for Geelong.
Scott Freeborn	Carlton	21 years, 324 days	5	48	17	
Andrew Merrington	Carlton	21 years, 203 days	15	18	11	
Stephen O'Reilly	Carlton	27 years, 138 days	3	12	1	Previously played for Geelong and Fremantle.
Adam Chatfield	Carlton	21 years, 23 days	19	1	0	
Ben Johnson	Collingwood	18 years, 343 days	1	235	70	
Shane O'Bree	Collingwood	20 years, 364 days	1	227	84	Previously played for Brisbane.
Leon Davis	Collingwood	18 years, 270 days	1	225	270	
Josh Fraser	Collingwood	18 years, 68 days	1	200	163	
Rhyce Shaw	Collingwood	18 years, 251 days	16	94	20	
Steven McKee	Collingwood	21 years, 292 days	5	64	13	Previously played for Richmond.
Andrew Dimattina	Collingwood	22 years, 207 days	13	28	6	Brother of Paul and son of Frank Dimattina.
Damien Adkins	Collingwood	19 years, 64 days	1	22	8	
Andrew Ukovic	Collingwood	21 years, 111 days	1	17	9	Previously played for Essendon.
Dale Baynes	Collingwood	19 years, 180 days	12	1	0	
Brad Smith	Collingwood	22 years, 325 days	12	1	0	
Aaron Henneman	Essendon	19 years, 159 days	11	58	5	
Jonathon Robran	Essendon	27 years, 147 days	2	8	3	Son of Barrie Robran and Brother of Matthew Robran. Previously played for Hawthorn.
Matthew Pavlich	Fremantle	18 years, 99 days	5	313	629	
Paul Hasleby	Fremantle	18 years, 273 days	1	208	131	
Troy Cook	Fremantle	23 years, 212 days	15	150	66	Previously played for Sydney.
Leigh Brown	Fremantle	18 years, 17 days	1	63	20	
Troy Longmuir	Fremantle	20 years, 291 days	1	55	36	Previously played for Melbourne.
Brendon Fewster	Fremantle	26 years, 67 days	1	37	16	Previously played for West Coast.
Ben Cunningham	Fremantle	18 years, 257 days	22	33	19	
Brad Bootsma	Fremantle	27 years, 123 days	8	23	7	Father of Josh Bootsma.
Daniel Schell	Fremantle	20 years, 150 days	15	16	11	
Joel Corey	Geelong	18 years, 134 days	17	276	79	
Cameron Ling	Geelong	19 years, 76 days	10	246	139	
Paul Chapman	Geelong	18 years, 204 days	12	251	336	
Cameron Mooney	Geelong	20 years, 278 days	17	210	295	Previously played for North Melbourne.
David Spriggs	Geelong	19 years, 46 days	1	64	20	
Daniel Foster	Geelong	18 years, 76 days	9	17	0	
Danny O'Brien	Geelong	20 years, 48 days	3	8	6	
Marcus Baldwin	Geelong	20 years, 280 days	21	5	5	
Chance Bateman	Hawthorn	18 years, 278 days	3	177	67	
Lance Picioane	Hawthorn	19 years, 363 days	13	58	24	Previously played for Adelaide.
Brett Johnson	Hawthorn	18 years, 239 days	16	38	10	
Barry Young	Hawthorn	29 years, 261 days	1	13	0	Previously played for Richmond and Essendon.
Luke McPharlin	Hawthorn	18 years, 130 days	5	12	3	
Steven Rode	Hawthorn	20 years, 3 days	5	1	0	
Brad Green	Melbourne	19 years, 4 days	2	254	350	
Cameron Bruce	Melbourne	20 years, 160 days	1	224	210	
Matthew Whelan	Melbourne	20 years, 141 days	4	150	15	
Paul Wheatley	Melbourne	18 years, 340 days	2	135	34	
Simon Godfrey	Melbourne	19 years, 279 days	20	105	23	
Stephen Powell	Melbourne	23 years, 183 days	1	44	43	Previously played for Western Bulldogs.
Steven Pitt	Melbourne	26 years, 283 days	8	5	2	Previously played for Collingwood.
James Cook	Melbourne	26 years, 61 days	1	3	8	Previously played for Carlton and Western Bulldogs.
Troy Makepeace	Kangaroos	21 years, 25 days	4	139	37	
Leigh Colbert	Kangaroos	24 years, 298 days	4	104	14	Previously played for Geelong.
Matthew Burton	Kangaroos	29 years, 296 days	1	77	33	Previously played for Fremantle.
David Calthorpe	Kangaroos	26 years, 206 days	1	13	10	Previously played for Essendon and Brisbane.
John Spaull	Kangaroos	22 years, 289 days	13	8	5	
Ryan Pagan	Kangaroos	22 years, 242 days	1	3	0	Son of Denis Pagan.
Brad Stephens	Kangaroos	21 years, 11 days	20	2	0	
Matthew Bishop	Port Adelaide	24 years, 266 days	4	132	4	Previously played for Melbourne.
Brett Montgomery	Port Adelaide	26 years, 282 days	1	126	51	Previously played for Western Bulldogs.
Josh Carr	Port Adelaide	20 years, 1 days	8	124	65	Brother of Matthew Carr.
Brent Guerra	Port Adelaide	17 years, 365 days	12	65	39	
Paul Koulouriotis	Port Adelaide	18 years, 139 days	18	3	0	
Steven Brosnan	Port Adelaide	21 years, 169 days	3	1	0	
Leon Cameron	Richmond	27 years, 188 days	1	84	40	Previously played for Western Bulldogs.
Aaron Fiora	Richmond	19 years, 5 days	7	78	25	
Ty Zantuck	Richmond	18 years, 159 days	20	68	20	Son of Shane Zantuck.
Clinton King	Richmond	21 years, 350 days	1	58	10	Previously played for Sydney and Collingwood.
Royce Vardy	Richmond	20 years, 3 days	9	34	3	
Andrew Mills	Richmond	18 years, 289 days	4	14	5	
Ezra Poyas	Richmond	19 years, 0 days	3	9	6	
Ben Haynes	Richmond	19 years, 19 days	19	5	0	
James White	Richmond	20 years, 127 days	12	4	1	
Jason Blake	St Kilda	19 years, 51 days	9	219	38	
Troy Schwarze	St Kilda	18 years, 101 days	4	71	20	Brother of Ben Schwarze.
Brett Moyle	St Kilda	20 years, 15 days	6	48	11	
Caydn Beetham	St Kilda	18 years, 63 days	10	37	9	
Tony Delaney	St Kilda	24 years, 76 days	1	33	6	Previously played for Essendon and Fremantle.
Chad Davis	St Kilda	19 years, 291 days	2	31	17	
Justin Plapp	St Kilda	22 years, 264 days	1	26	8	Previously played for Richmond.
Damian Monkhorst	St Kilda	30 years, 204 days	1	10	0	Previously played for Collingwood.
Sean Charles	St Kilda	24 years, 299 days	1	8	6	Previously played for Melbourne and Carlton.
Fred Campbell	St Kilda	20 years, 11 days	4	7	4	Previously played for Sydney.
Ryan O'Keefe	Sydney	19 years, 111 days	10	286	261	
Jason Ball	Sydney	27 years, 112 days	1	90	45	Previously played for West Coast.
Andrew Schauble	Sydney	23 years, 116 days	1	88	23	Previously played for Collingwood.
Stephen Doyle	Sydney	19 years, 9 days	20	47	19	
Ben Fixter	Sydney	19 years, 15 days	18	27	8	
Ryan Fitzgerald	Sydney	23 years, 148 days	1	10	15	
Brett Allison	Sydney	31 years, 291 days	1	9	9	Previously played for North Melbourne.
Darren Glass	West Coast	18 years, 323 days	4	270	8	
Adam Hunter	West Coast	19 years, 49 days	22	151	86	
Callum Chambers	West Coast	20 years, 175 days	10	66	41	
Kasey Green	West Coast	20 years, 296 days	17	54	8	
Kane Munro	West Coast	18 years, 141 days	21	18	11	
David Haynes	West Coast	18 years, 359 days	13	46	43	
David Antonowicz	West Coast	20 years, 2 days	3	3	0	
Michael O'Brien	West Coast	19 years, 328 days	15	2	0	
Scott Bennett	West Coast	20 years, 106 days	7	1	0	
Robert Murphy	Western Bulldogs	18 years, 36 days	19	271	171	
Nathan Eagleton	Western Bulldogs	21 years, 122 days	1	197	32	Previously played for Port Adelaide.
Mitch Hahn	Western Bulldogs	19 years, 4 days	10	181	64	
Trent Bartlett	Western Bulldogs	23 years, 106 days	1	42	34	Previously played for Brisbane.
Luke Penny	Western Bulldogs	19 years, 117 days	13	35	5	
Patrick Wiggins	Western Bulldogs	19 years, 130 days	15	12	5	
Andrew Wills	Western Bulldogs	28 years, 76 days	2	10	6	Previously played for Geelong and Fremantle.
