= 1999 AFL draft =

Draft for the Australian Football League

The 1999 AFL draft consisted of a pre-season draft, a national draft, a trade period, a rookie draft and rookie elevation. The AFL draft is the annual draft of talented players by Australian rules football teams that participate in the main competition of that sport, the Australian Football League.

In 1999 there were 93 picks to be drafted between 16 teams in the national draft. The Collingwood Magpies received the first pick in the national draft after finishing on the bottom of the ladder during the 1999 AFL season.

== Trades ==
Player	Original club	Traded to	Traded for
Matthew Clarke	Brisbane Lions	Adelaide Crows	draft picks #6 and #21(#15 to Adelaide)
Scott Welsh	Kangaroos	Adelaide Crows	draft picks #15 and #77
Stefan Carey	Sydney Swans	Brisbane Lions	draft pick #21
Michael Martin	Western Bulldogs	Brisbane Lions	Trent Bartlett and draft pick #32
Michael Mansfield	Geelong	Carlton	draft pick #31
Steven McKee	Richmond	Collingwood	Clinton King and draft pick #3
Andrew Ukovic	Essendon	Collingwood	Jonathon Robran and draft pick #40
Jonathon Robran	Hawthorn	Essendon	draft pick #33 and #48
Trent Bartlett	Brisbane Lions	Western Bulldogs	Michael Martin
Nathan Eagleton	Port Adelaide	Western Bulldogs	Brett Montgomery and draft pick #28
Troy Cook	Sydney Swans	Fremantle	draft pick #34
Brendon Fewster	West Coast Eagles	Fremantle	draft pick #16
Troy Longmuir	Melbourne	Fremantle	draft pick #19
Cameron Mooney	Kangaroos	Geelong	Leigh Colbert and draft pick #53
Lance Picioane	Adelaide Crows	Hawthorn	draft pick #79
Stephen Powell	Western Bulldogs	Melbourne	draft pick #35
David Calthorpe	Brisbane Lions	Kangaroos	draft pick #32
Leigh Colbert	Geelong	Kangaroos	Cameron Mooney and draft picks #15, #17 & #47
Matthew Bishop	Melbourne	Port Adelaide	draft pick #42
Brett Montgomery	Western Bulldogs	Port Adelaide	Nathan Eagleton
Leon Cameron	Western Bulldogs	Richmond	draft picks #37 and #66
Clinton King	Collingwood	Richmond	Steven McKee and draft pick #7
Justin Plapp	Richmond	St Kilda	draft pick #39
Jason Ball	West Coast Eagles	Sydney Swans	draft pick #11 and #41
Andrew Schauble	Collingwood	Sydney Swans	Mark Kinnear and draft pick #34
Mark Kinnear	Sydney Swans	Collingwood	Andrew Schauble
Stephen O'Reilly	Fremantle	Carlton	draft pick #16 and #46

In addition to the trades, Melbourne's first round draft pick (No. 5) was given to Fremantle, as part of penalties levied against Melbourne for breaches of the salary cap related to its recruitment of Jeff White from Fremantle two years earlier. Melbourne was also fined $600,000 and stripped of draft picks in the 2000 AFL draft.

== 1999 national draft ==
Round	Pick	Player	Recruited from	Recruited to
Priority	1	Josh Fraser	Murray Bushrangers	Collingwood
Priority	2	Paul Hasleby	East Fremantle	Fremantle
1	3	Aaron Fiora	Port Adelaide Magpies	Richmond
1	4	Matthew Pavlich	Woodville-West Torrens	Fremantle
1	5	Leigh Brown	Gippsland Power	Fremantle
1	6	Damian Cupido	Eastern Ranges	Brisbane Lions
1	7	Danny Roach	Tassie Mariners	Collingwood
1	8	Joel Corey	East Perth	Geelong
1	9	Caydn Beetham	Oakleigh Chargers	St Kilda
1	10	Luke McPharlin	East Fremantle	Hawthorn
1	11	Darren Glass	Perth	West Coast Eagles
1	12	Paul Koulouriotis	Calder Cannons	Port Adelaide
1	13	Robert Murphy	Gippsland Power	Western Bulldogs
1	14	Travis Gaspar	South Fremantle	West Coast Eagles
1	15	David Spriggs	Prahran Dragons	Geelong
1	16	David Haynes	Geelong Falcons	West Coast Eagles
1	17	Ezra Bray	Calder Cannons	Geelong
2	18 (F/S)	Rhyce Shaw	Preston Knights	Collingwood
2	19	Brad Green	Tassie Mariners	Melbourne
2	20	Paul Wheatley	Preston Knights	Melbourne
2	21	Scott Stevens	Perth	Sydney
2	22	Ezra Poyas	Prahran Dragons	Richmond
2	23	Daniel Foster	Port Adelaide	Geelong
2	24	Jason Blake	Prahran Dragons	St Kilda
2	25	Brett Johnson	Swan Districts	Hawthorn
2	26 (F/S)	Stephen Doyle	South Adelaide	Sydney
2	27	Cain Ackland	Port Adelaide	Port Adelaide
2	28	Brent Guerra	Bendigo Pioneers	Port Adelaide
2	29	Adam Hunter	Swan Districts	West Coast Eagles
2	30 (F/S)	Jonathan Brown	Geelong Falcons	Brisbane Lions
2	31	Paul Chapman	Calder Cannons	Geelong
2	32	Daniel Giansiracusa	Western Jets	Western Bulldogs
2	33	Tim Clarke	Geelong Falcons	Hawthorn
2	34	Leon Davis	Perth	Collingwood
3	35	Patrick Wiggins	Tassie Mariners	Western Bulldogs
3	36	Rhett Biglands	Woodville-West Torrens	Adelaide
3	37	Mitch Hahn	Northern Eagles	Western Bulldogs
3	38	Cameron Ling	Geelong Falcons	Geelong
3	39	Scott Homewood	Eastern Ranges	Richmond
3	40	David Hille	Dandenong Stingrays	Essendon
3	41	Kane Munro	Bendigo Pioneers	West Coast Eagles
3	42	Michael Clark	Eastern Ranges	Melbourne
3	43	Lindsay Gilbee	Eastern Ranges	Western Bulldogs
3	44 (F/S)	Shane Morrison	Northern Eagles	Brisbane Lions
3	45	Marcus Pickett	Port Adelaide	Essendon
3	46	Adam Butler	Murray Bushrangers	Fremantle
3	47	Corey Enright	Port Adelaide	Geelong
3	48	Chance Bateman	Perth	Hawthorn
3	49	Ben Cunningham	Claremont	Fremantle
3	50	Matthew Whelan	Woodville-West Torrens	Melbourne
4	51	Ricky O'Loughlin	Port Adelaide	Adelaide
4	52	Andrew Mills	Murray Bushrangers	Richmond
4	53	Clayton Lasscock	West Perth	Kangaroos
4	54	Murray Pitts	St Kilda Reserves	St Kilda
4	55	Tim Hazell	Southern Districts	Hawthorn
4	56	Ryan O'Keefe	Calder Cannons	Sydney
4	57	Steven Brosnan	Port Adelaide	Port Adelaide
4	58	Patrick Bowden	Rovers	Western Bulldogs
4	59	John Barnes	Geelong	Essendon
4	60	Richard Kelly	Perth	Carlton
4	61	Mark Ainley	Prahran Dragons	Kangaroos
4	62	Ben Johnson	Preston Knights	Collingwood
4	63	Shannon O'Brien	Gippsland Power	Melbourne
4	64	Cameron Bruce	Melbourne Reserves	Melbourne
4	65	Justin Cicolella	Woodville-West Torrens	Adelaide
4	66	Ryan Hargrave	Perth	Western Bulldogs
5	67	Robert Shirley	Woodville-West Torrens	Adelaide
5	68	Tony Delaney	Fremantle	St Kilda
5	69	Bill Nicholls	Geelong Falcons	Hawthorn
5	70	Brett Allison	Kangaroos	Sydney
5	71	Not utilised	–	Port Adelaide
5	72	Robert Forster-Knight	Murray Bushrangers	Essendon
5	73	Ryan Houlihan	Murray Bushrangers	Carlton
5	74	Matthew Burton	Fremantle	Kangaroos
5	75	Dale Baynes	East Fremantle	Collingwood
5	76	Not utilised	–	Fremantle
5	77	Lindsay Smith	Glenelg	Kangaroos
5	78	Ty Zantuck	Western Jets	Richmond
5	79	Balraj Singh	West Adelaide	Adelaide
5	80	Jeremy Dukes	Prahran Dragons	Carlton
5	81	Troy Makepeace	Kangaroos Reserves	Kangaroos
5	82	Nick Stone	Prahran Dragons	Collingwood
6	83	Matthew Shir	Murray Bushrangers	Adelaide
6	84	Not utilised	–	Richmond
6	85	Not utilised	–	Hawthorn
6	86	Trent Hotton	East Burwood	Carlton
6	87	Christian Woodley	Subiaco	Kangaroos
6	88	Michael W. Clark	Fremantle	Collingwood
6	89	Not utilised	–	Adelaide
6	90	Andrew Merrington	St Bernards	Carlton
6	91	Not utilised	–	Adelaide
6	92	Adam Mathews	Murray Bushrangers	Carlton
6	93	Joe Allen	Gippsland Power	Carlton

== 2000 pre-season draft ==
Pick	Player	Recruited from	Recruited to
1	Shane O'Bree	Brisbane Lions	Collingwood
2	Brad Bootsma	South Fremantle	Fremantle
3	James Cook	Western Bulldogs	Melbourne
4	James Byrne	Glenelg	Adelaide
5	Fred Campbell	Sydney Swans	St Kilda
6	Barry Young	Essendon	Hawthorn
7	Ben Fixter	NSW/ACT Rams	Sydney Swans
8	Wade Chapman	Sydney Swans	Port Adelaide
9	Andrew Wills	Fremantle	Western Bulldogs
10	Simon Hawking	Sydney Swans	Collingwood
11	Steven Pitt	Norwood	Melbourne
12	Andrew Crowell	Woodville-West Torrens	Adelaide
13	Damian Monkhorst	Collingwood	St Kilda
14	Simon Godfrey	Melbourne Reserves	Melbourne
15	Sean Charles	Woorinen	St Kilda

== 2000 rookie draft ==
Round	Pick	Player	Recruited from	Club
1	1	Damien Lyon	Prahran Dragons	Collingwood
1	2	Nathan Carroll	Claremont	Fremantle
1	3	Mark Bradly	Melbourne	Melbourne
1	4	Michael Doughty	South Adelaide	Adelaide
1	5	Ben Haynes	Western Jets	Richmond
1	6	Marcus Baldwin	Hawthorn (reserves)	Geelong
1	7	Mark Wittison	Prahran Dragons	St Kilda
1	8	Ryan Ablett	Beaconsfield	Hawthorn
1	9	Tadhg Kennelly	Kerry	Sydney
1	10	Darren Burton	Port Adelaide	Port Adelaide
1	11	Matthiue Lucas	St Kevins	Western Bulldogs
1	12	Toby McGrath	South Fremantle	West Coast
1	13	Ben Doherty	Morningside	Brisbane Lions
1	14	Cory McGrath	South Fremantle	Essendon
1	15	Adam Pickering	Calder Cannons	Carlton
1	16	Nick Lowther	Kangaroos (reserves)	Kangaroos
2	17	Leigh Sheehan	Gippsland Power	Collingwood
2	18	Robbie Haddrill	Perth	Fremantle
2	19	Luke Taylor	Melbourne (reserves)	Melbourne
2	20	Josh Coulter	Central District	Adelaide
2	21	Royce Vardy	Devon-Welshpool-Wron Wron-Woodside	Richmond
2	22	Shane Ryan	Oakleigh Chargers	Geelong
2	23	Stephen Milne	Essendon (reserves)	St Kilda
2	24	Shane Tuck	Dandenong Stingrays	Hawthorn
2	25	Brett White	North Adelaide	Sydney
2	26	Dean Brogan	South Adelaide	Port Adelaide
2	27	Brad Fuller	Collingwood	Western Bulldogs
2	28	Dean Cox	East Perth	West Coast
2	29	Jason Anthonisz	Northern Eagles	Brisbane Lions
2	30	David Johnson	Calder Cannons	Essendon
2	31	Craig Clarke	Springvale	Brisbane Lions
2	32	Michael Ablett	Dandenong Stingrays	Kangaroos
3	33	Andrew Dimattina	Essendon (reserves)	Collingwood
3	34	Luke Newick	Subiaco	Fremantle
3	35	Passed	N/A	Melbourne
3	36	Chris Robertson	North Adelaide	Adelaide
3	37	Robbie Taylor	Richmond (reserves)	Richmond
3	38	Brent Cowell	St Kilda (reserves)	Geelong
3	39	Olly Trand	Prahran Dragons	St Kilda
3	40	Timothy Malseed	Hawthorn (reserves)	Hawthorn
3	41	Leigh Brockman	Geelong	Sydney
3	42	Tom Carr	Port Adelaide	Port Adelaide
3	43	Justin Wood	Geelong	Western Bulldogs
3	44	Kasey Green	East Fremantle	West Coast
3	45	Passed	N/A	Brisbane Lions
3	46	Adam Switala	Central District	Essendon
3	47	Jordan Doering	Essendon (reserves)	Carlton
3	48	Mark Hilton	North Albury	Kangaroos
4	49	Dale Walkingshaw	Peel Thunder	Fremantle
4	50	Jonathan Yerbury	Norwood	Adelaide
4	51	Teghan Henderson	Richmond (reserves)	Richmond
4	52	Brett Moyle	St Kilda (reserves)	St Kilda
4	53	Passed	N/A	Hawthorn
4	54	Passed	N/A	Sydney
4	55	Scott Hahn	Port Adelaide	Port Adelaide
4	56	Luke Donaldson	Dandenong Stingrays	Western Bulldogs
4	57	Passed	N/A	Brisbane Lions
4	58	James Podsiadly	Western Jets	Essendon
4	59	Mark Passador	Springvale	Carlton
4	60	Ryan Pagan	Kangaroos (reserves)	Kangaroos
5	61	Troy Kirwen	Collingwood (reserves)	Richmond
5	62	Passed	N/A	Hawthorn
5	63	Passed	N/A	Sydney
5	64	Nathan Clarke	Maroochydore	Brisbane Lions
6	65	David Le Pavoux	NSW/ACT Rams	Sydney
6	66	Jeff Cooper	Northern Eagles	Brisbane Lions
7	67	Peter McGrath	NSW/ACT Rams	Sydney
7	68	Stephen Kenna	Morningside	Brisbane Lions
8	69	Scott Muller	NSW/ACT Rams	Sydney
8	70	Hayden Kluver	Sherwood	Brisbane Lions

== Rookie elevation ==
In alphabetical order of professional clubs. This list details 1999-listed rookies who were elevated to the senior list; it does not list players taken as rookies in the rookie draft which occurred during the 1999/2000 off-season.

Player	Recruited from	Recruited to
Matthew Golding	Glenelg	Adelaide Crows
Dean Howard	West Adelaide	Adelaide Crows
Trent Knobel	Broadbeach	Brisbane Lions
Heath Culpitt	Castlemaine	Carlton
Simon Fletcher	Geelong Reserves	Carlton
Dean Rioli	South Fremantle	Essendon
Ashley Clancy	Subiaco	Fremantle
Antoni Grover	Subiaco	Fremantle
Darren Bolton	Peel Thunder	Fremantle
Paul Lindsay	East Fremantle	Geelong
Kent Kingsley	Woodville-West Torrens	Kangaroos
Glen Bowyer	Murray Bushrangers	Hawthorn
Ben Beams	Tassie Mariners	Melbourne
Luke Williams	Oakleigh Chargers	Melbourne
Scott Bassett	Port Adelaide Magpies	Port Adelaide
Ben Hollands	Sydney Reserves	Richmond
Chad Davis	Oakleigh Chargers	St Kilda
James Gowans	Werribee	St Kilda
Gerrard Bennett	Geelong Reserves	Sydney Swans
Brett Kirk	North Albury	Sydney Swans
Adam Contessa	Kangaroos Reserves	Western Bulldogs
Shaun Tinsley	Port Melbourne	Western Bulldogs

== See also ==
- Official AFL Draft page
