= Robran =

Robran is a surname. Notable people with the surname include:

- Barrie Robran (1947–2025), Australian rules footballer
- Jonathon Robran (born 1972), Australian rules footballer
- Matthew Robran (born 1971), Australian rules footballer
