= Stuart Mangin =

Australian rules footballer

Personal information
- Full name: Stuart Mangin
- Born: 8 February 1977 (age 49)
- Original team: Macleod / Northern Knights
- Draft: 20th, 1994 AFL draft
- Height: 190 cm (6 ft 3 in)
- Weight: 95 kg (209 lb)

Playing career^{1}
Years	Club	Games (Goals)
1995–1997	Sydney Swans	0 (0)
1998	Collingwood	3 (2)
- ^{1} Playing statistics correct to the end of 1998.

Stuart Mangin (born 8 February 1977) is a former Australian rules footballer who played with Collingwood in the Australian Football League (AFL).

Mangin, who was from Macleod originally, was playing with the Northern Knights in the TAC Cup when drafted by the Sydney Swans. He only played reserves football for the Swans and was traded to Collingwood at the end of the 1997 season. The trade saw Mangin and teammate Clinton King go to Collingwood, in exchange of Robert Ahmat and the draft selection which secured Fred Campbell.

He made three appearances for Collingwood in the 1998 AFL season and in the last of those kicked two goals against Richmond at the Melbourne Cricket Ground. A defender, he later played at Norwood.
