= Patrick Wiggins =

Patrick Wiggins may refer to:

- Patrick Wiggins (footballer) (born 1981), an Australian rules footballer
- Patrick Wiggins (astronomer) (born 1949), an American amateur astronomer and discoverer of minor planets and supernovae
