= Steven McKee =

Australian rules footballer

Steve McKee

Personal information
- Born: 20 June 1978 (age 48)
- Original team: Myrtleford (OMFL)
- Debut: Round 8, 17 May 1998, Richmond vs. Adelaide, at AAMI Stadium

Playing career^{1}
Years	Club	Games (Goals)
1997-1999	Richmond	20 (20)
2000–2004	Collingwood	66 (54)
Total		86 (74)
- ^{1} Playing statistics correct to the end of 2004.

Career highlights
- Collingwood Grand Final side 2002; Collingwood Pre-Season Grand Final side 2003

Steve McKee (born 20 June 1978) is a former Australian rules footballer for both Richmond (1998–1999) and Collingwood (2000–2004) in the Australian Football League. An effective ruckman, McKee is best remembered for his four-year stint with Collingwood, where he represented the team in the 2002 AFL Grand Final.

McKee grew up in Porepunkah and played for the nearby Myrtleford Football Club before moving to Melbourne.

After a short two-year stay at Punt Road, Collingwood acquired the services of McKee, along with draft selection seven (Danny Roach) in return for Clinton King and draft selection three (Aaron Fiora) at the end of season 1999. McKee's first season at the club was marred by Legionnaires' Disease, picked up from one of the spa baths at the club's headquarters at Victoria Park, though it was not enough to stop him from shutting down Essendon's key forward Scott Lucas on Anzac Day in the round seven loss. His second season saw gradual improvement, marked by the attention he received for the tactic employed by coach Mick Malthouse midseason, which saw both McKee and fellow ruckman Josh Fraser begin at the centre bounce, with the decision on who rucked made at the last minute, leaving opposing ruckmen flummoxed. McKee's career flourished in season 2002, where his ability to drift a kick behind the play and aid his defenders was crucial in the team's success, as was his ability to act like a fourth midfielder at the stoppages, his efforts twice negating the influence of Port Adelaide powerhouse Matthew Primus, most crucially in the Qualifying Final defeat of the Power. McKee's efforts in the Grand Final were brave, as although swamped by Clark Keating, McKee still managed to lay an impressive nine tackles, breaking the rucking stereotype.

Season 2003 saw McKee all but umpired out of the game by a new rule interpretation which worked against his style of ruckwork, which was to stand toe-to-toe with his opponent, instead of leaping. This paved the way for Fraser to make the position his own, relegating McKee to the role of the second stringer, missing out on the finals action, though many believe the durable McKee should have received a call up when Anthony Rocca was suspended for the Grand Final.

His final year at league level, 2004, was a quiet one, the Pies dropping out of the finals race early in the piece, and despite impressive efforts against Brisbane and the Western Bulldogs late in the season, found himself delisted at season's end.

Since finishing his playing career McKee has worked as a part-time assistant coach at Carlton. McKee will return to football in 2009, having signed with the Warragul Football Club. In 2013, McKee began playing with the Yarrawonga in the Ovens & Murray Football League.
