= Michael Martin (Australian footballer) =

Australian rules footballer

Personal information
- Full name: Michael Martin
- Born: 25 February 1977 (age 49)
- Original team: Hobart
- Draft: 14th, 1994 AFL draft
- Height: 182 cm (6 ft 0 in)
- Weight: 86 kg (190 lb)

Playing career^{1}
| Years | Club | Games (Goals) |
| 1995–1999 | Footscray/Western Bulldogs | 48 (18) |
| 2000–2001 | Brisbane Lions | 10 (0) |
| Total | | 58 (18) |
- ^{1} Playing statistics correct to the end of 2001.

Michael Martin (born 25 February 1977) is a former Australian rules footballer who played with Footscray and the Brisbane Lions in the Australian Football League (AFL).

Martin played originally at Hobart and represented Tasmania at the Teal Cup in 1994 when he won the Hunter Harrison Medal. As a result, he was picked early in the 1994 AFL draft, with Footscray's first selection and made his league debut at just 18 years of age.

The Tasmanian initially found it difficult to find a place in the midfield but played finals football in 1997, finishing the year as a participant in the club's two-point preliminary final loss to Adelaide. He played all 24 games in 1998 and again suffered the disappointment of appearing in a losing preliminary final side although he accounted for himself well with 21 disposals.

He was traded to the Brisbane Lions in the 1999 AFL draft, with the Bulldogs receiving Trent Bartlett as well as the pick which secured Daniel Giansiracusa. Martin played 10 of the first 12 games of the 2000 season before being struck by osteitis pubis, an injury which ended his AFL career.
