= Denis Clark =

Australian rules footballer

Personal information
- Full name: Denis K. Clark
- Born: 22 April 1950 (age 76)
- Original team: East Malvern
- Height: 174 cm (5 ft 9 in)
- Weight: 74 kg (163 lb)

Playing career^{1}
Years	Club	Games (Goals)
1968–1975	Melbourne	113 (49)
- ^{1} Playing statistics correct to the end of 1975.

Denis Clark (born 22 April 1950) is a former Australian rules footballer who played with Melbourne in the Victorian Football League (VFL).

Clark, a centreman recruited from East Malvern, played with Melbourne for eight seasons, from 1968 to 1975. He then went to Sandringham, where he played until 1980, captaining the club in his final two seasons. His son, Michael Clark, played one game for Melbourne, in 2002.
