= Bill Nicholls (Australian footballer) =

Australian rules footballer

Personal information
- Full name: William Lindsay Nicholls
- Born: 2 January 1981 (age 45)
- Original team: Geelong Falcons
- Draft: 69th, 1999 AFL draft
- Height: 184 cm (6 ft 0 in)
- Weight: 86 kg (190 lb)

Playing career^{1}
Years	Club	Games (Goals)
2001	Hawthorn	6 (5)
2003–2004	Richmond	10 (2)
Total		16 (7)
- ^{1} Playing statistics correct to the end of 2004.

Career highlights
- VFL premiership player: 2001

William Lindsay Nicholls (born 2 January 1981) is a former Australian rules footballer who played with Hawthorn and Richmond in the Australian Football League (AFL).

Nicholls, who was just 15 when he began playing at North Shore in Geelong, was recruited from the Falcons late in the 1999 AFL draft. He had a memorable debut in 2001 for Hawthorn with 17 disposals and three goals against Geelong at Docklands Stadium and finished the year with an elimination final appearance.

With a hamstring injury keeping him out of action in 2002, Nicholls nominated for the 2002 AFL draft and was picked up by Richmond with the 47th selection. Injuries continued to restrict him and he could only manage 10 games in his two seasons. Nicholls retired from football at the end of the 2004 season.

On 18 June 2012, a twenty-six-year-old man was shot outside Nicholls's home in Corio. Nicholls was arrested and questioned by the police over the shooting but later released. In April 2013 he was arrested by the Victoria Police Special Operations Group and subsequently charged over both the June 2012 incident and another shooting in January 2013. In February 2015 he was found guilty of shooting two men. On 23 March 2015 he was sentenced to 11 years (8 years minimum before parole) in jail.
