= Peter Filandia =

Australian rules footballer

Personal information
- Born: 14 May 1970 (age 56)
- Original team: Doutta Stars (EDFL)
- Height: 160 cm (5 ft 3 in)
- Weight: 77 kg (170 lb)

Playing career^{1}
Years	Club	Games (Goals)
1991–1993	Essendon	13 (14)
1994–2000	Sydney	70 (38)
Total		83 (52)
- ^{1} Playing statistics correct to the end of 2000.

Peter Filandia (born 14 May 1970) is a former Australian rules footballer.

Filandia started his AFL career in 1991 at Essendon FC but left the club at the end of 1993, after playing in the club's 1992 reserves premiership. Filandia won the Gardiner Medal (AFL Reserve grade best and fairest award) with 24 votes in the 1992 season but was deemed ineligible due to being suspended for 2 weeks during the home and away season.

After not playing a senior game the following year he was recruited to the Sydney Swans from Essendon at pick 6 in the 1994 pre-season draft.

Filandia was a regular senior player during his 7 seasons at Sydney and was a crowd favourite but was cut down by serious injuries during this period (2 Knee ACL injuries - 1995, 1997)

Following the completion of his AFL career in 2000, Filandia joined Port Melbourne Football Club as its captain and senior assistant coach. He was notable for being suspended for 10 matches after admitting he bit opponent Chad Davis’s scrotum during a match.

Filandia is currently working for AFL SportsReady Ltd managing AFL club traineeships.
