= Michael Clark (Australian footballer) =

Australian rules footballer

Personal information
- Full name: Michael J. Clark
- Born: 15 July 1981 (age 45)
- Original team: Warrandyte/Beverley Hills/Eastern Ranges
- Draft: 42nd overall, 1999 AFL draft 65th overall, 2002 Rookie draft
- Height: 184 cm (6 ft 0 in)
- Weight: 80 kg (176 lb)
- Position: Midfielder

Playing career^{1}
Years	Club	Games (Goals)
2000–2003	Melbourne	1 (1)
- ^{1} Playing statistics correct to the end of 2003.

Michael J. Clark (born 15 July 1981) is a former Australian rules footballer who played for the Melbourne Football Club in the Australian Football League (AFL) and for East Perth in the West Australian Football League (WAFL).

== Early life ==
Clark is the son of former Melbourne player, Denis, who played 113 matches for the Demons in the 1960s and '70s. Clark's father did not allow him to play competitive football until he was 11; once he was old enough, he played junior football for Warrandyte and then Beverley Hills. Clark then went on to play for the Eastern Ranges in the TAC Cup competition, finishing in the top three of the best and fairest in both of the seasons that he played for Ranges.

== AFL career ==
Clark was drafted by the Melbourne Football Club, the same club his father had played for, with Melbourne's fourth selection, 42nd overall, in the 1999 AFL draft. Clark missed the majority of the 2000 season due to injury. He did, however, play for Sandringham, Melbourne's VFL-affiliate, in their winning VFL reserves Grand Final. Clark spent the first three-quarters of the match playing on the wing and was moved to full-forward for the last quarter.

Clark played his first match for Melbourne in an exhibition match against Adelaide at the Oval in London. The match was played in wet conditions, and Clark acquitted himself well in a match that the Demons won, although he was almost seriously injured when he slid over the boundary line and hit the interchange bench. Clark played his second match for Melbourne in the 2001 pre-season, against Richmond. Despite this, Clark was unable to break into Melbourne's senior side throughout the 2001 season, though he was regularly named as an emergency.

Clark was named as an emergency several times during 2002, and suffered a setback during the middle of the season, missing nine weeks after breaking both of his wrists. Clark ultimately made his AFL debut in round 22 against St Kilda. Clark had initially been named as an emergency, but after injuries to Daniel Ward and Matthew Whelan, Clark was called upon to play. He spent the first half of the game on the bench, but came on in the third quarter and set up a Russell Robertson goal with his first kick. With his next kick, Clark kicked a goal himself from 50 meters out that put Melbourne in front in a match the Demons ended up winning to guarantee themselves a place in the finals. Despite playing well, Clark was dropped for the next week and his first match of AFL football also proved to be his last.

Clark was delisted by the Demons at the end of the 2002 season and was subsequently drafted onto Melbourne's rookie list only months after his delisting, with the 65th selection in the 2002 Rookie draft. Clark, however, never played another senior game for the Demons and was delisted at the end of the 2003 season, after rupturing his spleen in June forced him to miss the rest of the 2003 season.

== WAFL career ==
After being delisted by Melbourne, Clark moved to Western Australia, to play for East Perth in the WAFL. He played 41 games for the Royals from 2004 to 2007. Clark then went on to play for South Bunbury in 2008.
