= Derek King (Australian footballer) =

Australian rules footballer

Personal information
- Full name: Derek John Edmund King
- Born: 7 September 1948
- Died: 28 April 2014 (aged 65)
- Height: 170 cm (5 ft 7 in)
- Weight: 67 kg (148 lb)
- Position: Rover

Playing career^{1}
Years	Club	Games (Goals)
1967–1969	St Kilda	11 (5)
- ^{1} Playing statistics correct to the end of 1969.

Derek John Edmund King (7 September 1948 – 28 April 2014) was an Australian rules footballer who played for St Kilda in the Victorian Football League (VFL) during the late 1960s.

King came into the St Kilda senior side after making his way up from the thirds but couldn't establish himself in the VFL.

A rover, he played briefly in Western Australia with Swan Districts before joining Oakleigh in the Victorian Football Association. He played his best football at Oakleigh, winning two Association best and fairest awards: the first division's J. J. Liston Trophy in 1975, and then the second division's J. Field Trophy in 1977, when he polled a record 67 votes. he also placed second by a single vote for the Liston Trophy in 1976, and third in 1970. He transferred to first division team Caulfield in 1978, and placed third for the Liston Trophy again in 1980.

Overall, King played 139 VFA games; 85 with Oakleigh and 54 with Caulfield.

King's father Robert played for VFA club Brighton while his son, Clinton King, was an AFL player at three separate clubs.

He died from cancer on 28 April 2014, aged 65.
