= Andrew Mills (Australian footballer) =

Australian rules footballer (born 1981)

Personal information
- Full name: Andrew Mills
- Born: 18 June 1981 (age 45)
- Original teams: Euroa, Murray Bushrangers
- Height: 186 cm (6 ft 1 in)
- Weight: 80 kg (176 lb)

Playing career^{1}
Years	Club	Games (Goals)
2000–2003	Richmond	14 (5)
- ^{1} Playing statistics correct to the end of 2003.

Andrew Mills (born 18 June 1981) is an Australian rules footballer who played for Richmond in the Australian Football League (AFL) in 2004 and 2005.

He was drafted from the Murray Bushrangers in the TAC Cup, with the 52nd selection in the 1999 AFL draft. He played 14 games in four seasons at the Tigers before he was delisted at the end of the 2003 season.
