= Shane Zantuck =

Australian rules footballer, born 1955

Personal information
- Full name: Shane Zantuck
- Born: 20 May 1955 (age 71)
- Original team: Jacana
- Height: 178 cm (5 ft 10 in)
- Weight: 73 kg (161 lb)

Playing career^{1}
Years	Club	Games (Goals)
1974–76	North Melbourne	5 (3)
1977–80	South Melbourne	56 (36)
1981–86	Melbourne	88 (13)
Total		149 (52)
- ^{1} Playing statistics correct to the end of 1986.

Shane Zantuck (born 20 May 1955) is a former Australian rules footballer and coach who played with the Melbourne Football Club, North Melbourne Football Club, and the South Melbourne Football Club in the Victorian Football League (VFL).

== Playing career ==
Originally a running winger, Zantuck later played primarily in defence. He began his VFL career with North Melbourne, playing just five games from 1974 to 1976. He then moved to South Melbourne, where he played 56 games from 1977-1980.

Zantuck is best known for his time at Melbourne, where he played 88 games between 1981 and 1986 before retiring from league season.

=== Barrasi Incident ===
During Round 14 of the 1984 VFL season, Zantuck was involved in a heated verbal exchange with Melbourne coach Ron Barassi during the three-quarter-time break. Zantuck later downplayed the incident, stating, in a 1995 interview, that it amounted to “a couple of swear words thrown at each other” and describing it as a minor exchange that was often exaggerated in later retellings. Barassi, in a 2012 interview, later said he and Zantuck made up in regards to the incident.

== Coaching career ==
It was announced in 2013, following Zantuck's VFL career, that he would be an assistant coach at St Bernard’s Old Collegians Football Club.

In 2017, Zantuck was appointed senior women’s coach of the Swans.

== Personal life ==
Shane Zantuck is the brother of SEN 1116 radio presenter Troy Zantuck, the father of AFL footballer Ty Zantuck, and the husband of Karmene Zantuck.
