= Tim Clarke (Australian footballer) =

Australian rules footballer

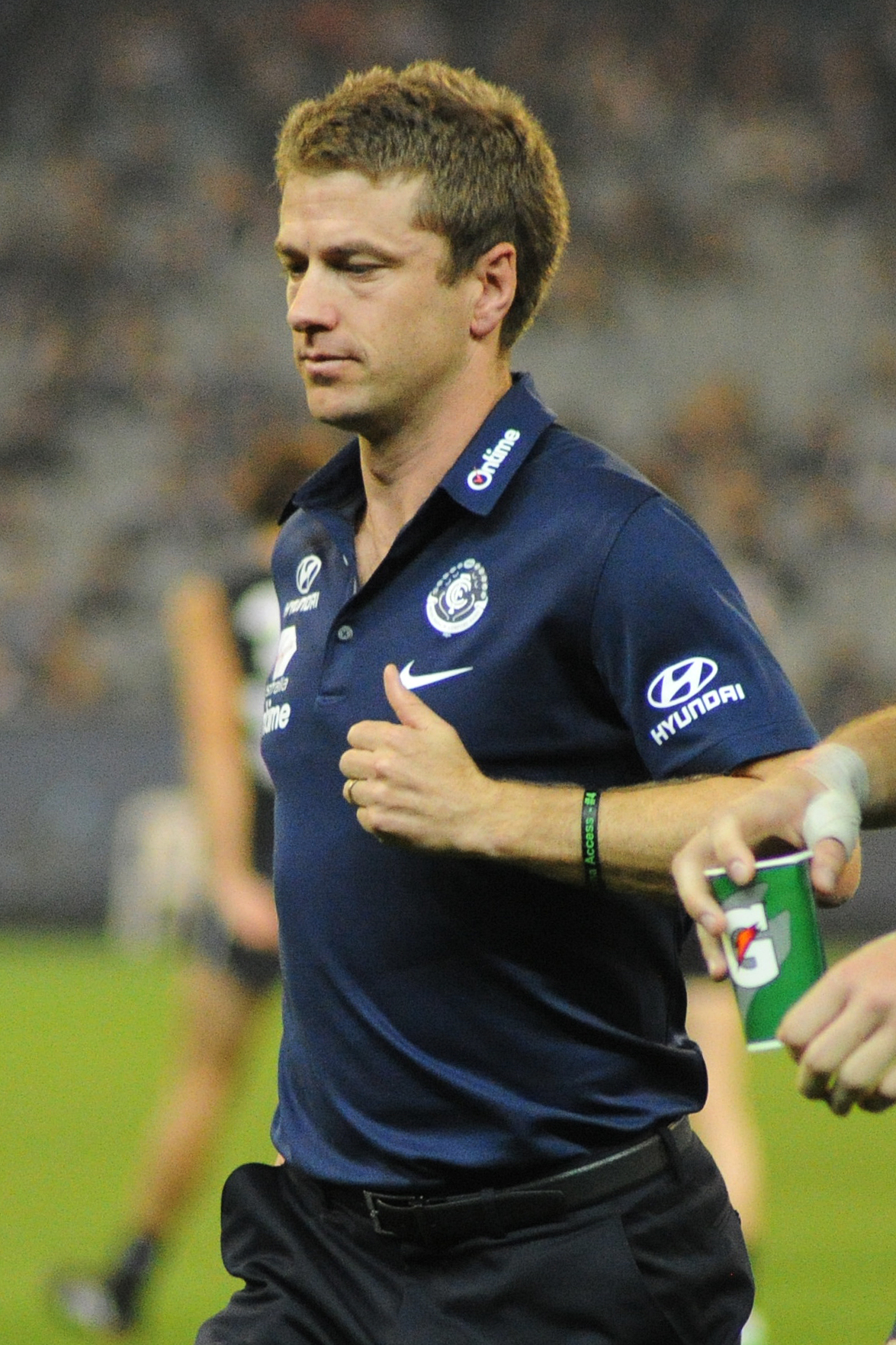
- Clarke with Carlton in April 2018

Personal information
- Full name: Tim Clarke
- Born: 2 April 1982 (age 44)
- Original team: Geelong Falcons
- Draft: No. 33, 1999 national draft
- Debut: Round 1, 2001, Hawthorn vs. Collingwood, at Melbourne Cricket Ground
- Height: 176 cm (5 ft 9 in)
- Weight: 77 kg (170 lb)
- Position: Midfielder

Playing career^{1}
Years	Club	Games (Goals)
2001–2008	Hawthorn	96 (39)
- ^{1} Playing statistics correct to the end of 2008.

Tim Clarke (born 2 April 1982) is a former professional Australian rules footballer who played for the Hawthorn Football Club in the Australian Football League (AFL). He previously worked as an assistant coach for Carlton Football Club.

== Playing career ==
=== Hawthorn ===
He was educated at The Geelong College. Recruited from Geelong, Clarke played for Hawthorn Football Club from 2001 until 2008, with a total of 96 games and he kicked 39 goals. Clarke won the 'Most improved' and 'Most determined' awards for Hawthorn in 2004 and 2005 respectively. He was delisted by Hawthorn at the end of the 2008 AFL season.

== Coaching career ==
=== Richmond Football Club ===
Clarke became a development coach in an assistant coaching role for the Richmond Football Club in 2010 under senior coach Damien Hardwick . At the end of 2011, he left the club to venture overseas for a year; he returned in 2013, and was also appointed senior coach of the club's VFL-affiliate Coburg. When Richmond ended its affiliation with Coburg entered its own reserves team in 2014, Clarke was appointed coach of the side.

=== Carlton Football Club ===
From 2016 until 2018, he was midfield assistant coach at Carlton under senior coach Brendon Bolton.

=== Gold Coast Suns ===
From 2019 until 2021, he was a development coach and forwards assistant coach at Gold Coast Suns under senior coach Stuart Dew.

=== Return to Carlton Football Club ===
In October 2021, he returned to Carlton to again take up the midfield assistant coaching position under senior coach Michael Voss. Clarke departed the Carlton Football Club at the end of the 2026 AFL season on 10 September 2026.

== Statistics ==
Legend
G	Goals	K	Kicks	D	Disposals	T	Tackles
B	Behinds	H	Handballs	M	Marks

Season	Team	No.	Games	Totals							Averages (per game)							Votes
Season	Team	No.	Games	G	B	K	H	D	M	T	G	B	K	H	D	M	T	Votes
2000	Hawthorn	25	0	—	—	—	—	—	—	—	—	—	—	—	—	—	—	0
2001	Hawthorn	25	15	6	3	85	64	149	37	12	0.4	0.2	5.7	4.3	9.9	2.5	0.8	0
2002	Hawthorn	25	5	0	0	21	11	32	11	5	0.0	0.0	4.2	2.2	6.4	2.2	1.0	0
2003	Hawthorn	25	12	3	5	75	79	154	42	29	0.3	0.4	6.3	6.6	12.8	3.5	2.4	0
2004	Hawthorn	25	15	2	4	113	121	234	45	40	0.1	0.3	7.5	8.1	15.6	3.0	2.7	0
2005	Hawthorn	25	21	12	6	188	189	377	97	54	0.6	0.3	9.0	9.0	18.0	4.6	2.6	0
2006	Hawthorn	25	18	12	1	159	183	342	121	36	0.7	0.1	8.8	10.2	19.0	6.7	2.0	1
2007	Hawthorn	25	2	1	0	15	19	34	8	1	0.5	0.0	7.5	9.5	17.0	4.0	0.5	0
2008	Hawthorn	25	8	3	4	49	58	107	38	10	0.4	0.5	6.1	7.3	13.4	4.8	1.3	0
Career			96	39	23	705	724	1429	399	187	0.4	0.2	7.3	7.5	14.9	4.2	1.9	1
