= Andrew Dimattina =

Australian rules footballer (born 1977)

Personal information
- Full name: Andrew Dimattina
- Born: 9 November 1977 (age 48)
- Original team: Oakleigh Chargers/Box Hill Hawks
- Draft: 33rd overall, 1999 Rookie Draft
- Height: 183 cm (6 ft 0 in)
- Weight: 88 kg (194 lb)
- Position: Midfielder

Playing career^{1}
Years	Club	Games (Goals)
1999–2002	Collingwood	28 (6)
- ^{1} Playing statistics correct to the end of 2002.

Career highlights
- Joseph Wren Memorial Trophy 2002

Andrew Dimattina (born 9 November 1977) is a former Australian rules footballer who played primarily as a midfielder for Collingwood Football Club in the Australian Football League (AFL). Dimattina was 22 years old when he made his senior debut for Collingwood and played mainly as a run-with player. He is the brother of Paul Dimattina who played for Western Bulldogs and is the son of Frank Dimattina who played for Richmond and North Melbourne.
