= Rhyce Shaw =

Australian rules footballer (born 1981)

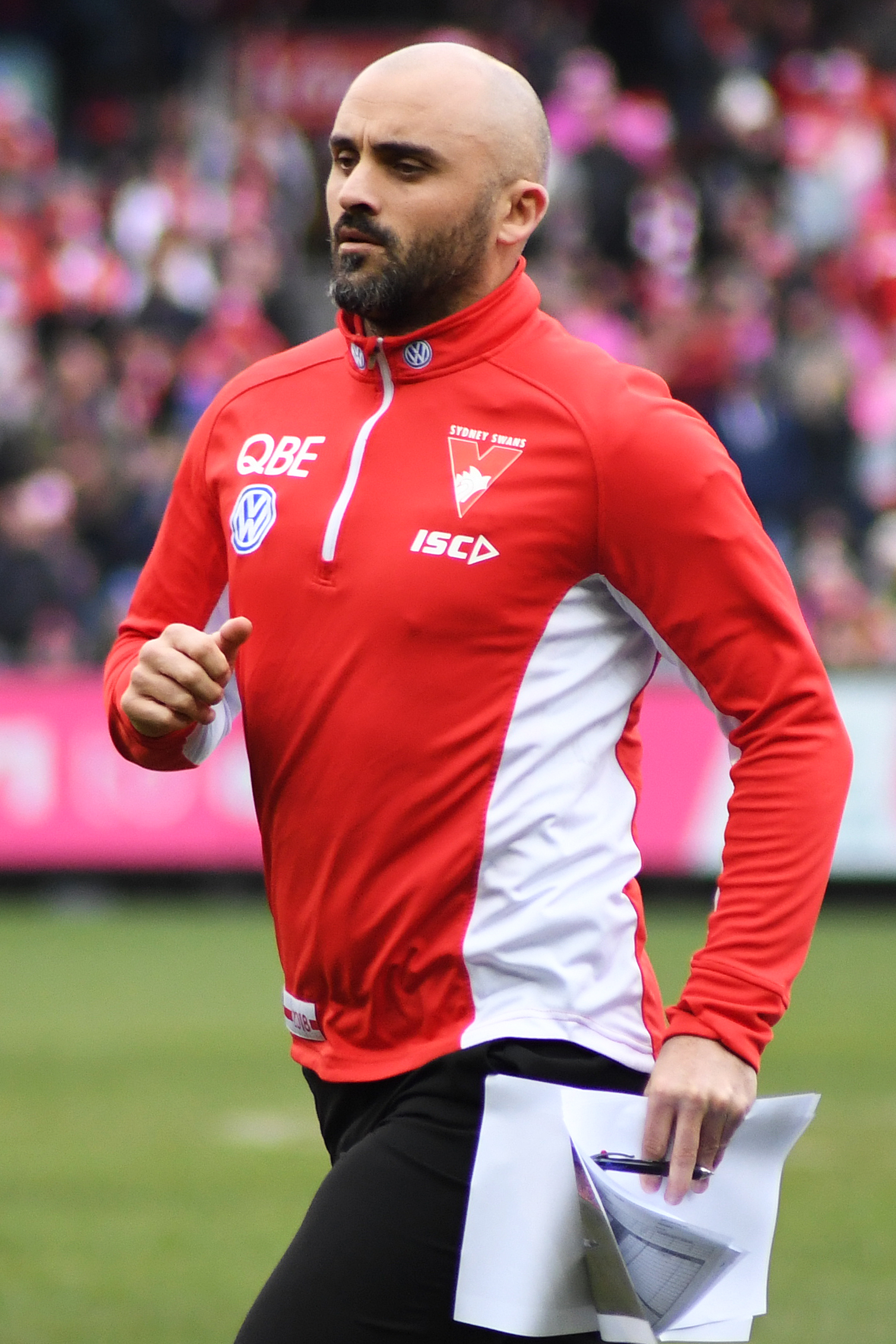
- Shaw with Sydney in August 2018

Personal information
- Full name: Rhyce Shaw
- Born: 16 October 1981 (age 45)
- Original team: Preston Knights (TAC Cup)
- Draft: No. 18 (F/S), 1999 National Draft, Collingwood
- Height: 182 cm (6 ft 0 in)
- Weight: 82 kg (181 lb)
- Position: Defender

Playing career^{1}
Years	Club	Games (Goals)
2000–2008	Collingwood	94 (20)
2009–2015	Sydney	143 (24)
Total		237 (44)

Coaching career^{3}
Years	Club	Games (W–L–D)
2019–2020	North Melbourne	29 (10–19–0)
2025–present	Gold Coast (AFLW)	24 (11–13–0)
- ^{1} Playing statistics correct to the end of 2015.^{3} Coaching statistics correct as of Round 12, 2026.

Career highlights
- AFL premiership player: 2012; NEAFL coach of the year: 2016

Rhyce Shaw (born 16 October 1981) is a current Australian rules football coach and former player who is the head coach of the Gold Coast Suns in AFL Women's (AFLW).

Shaw grew up in Diamond Creek and played for Diamond Creek Football Club. He played for the Collingwood Football Club and Sydney Swans in the Australian Football League (AFL), winning the 2012 premiership with Sydney. Shaw was the men's senior coach of the North Melbourne Football Club, before becoming the first person to be a non-caretaker head coach at both AFL and AFLW level.

== Playing career ==
=== Collingwood ===
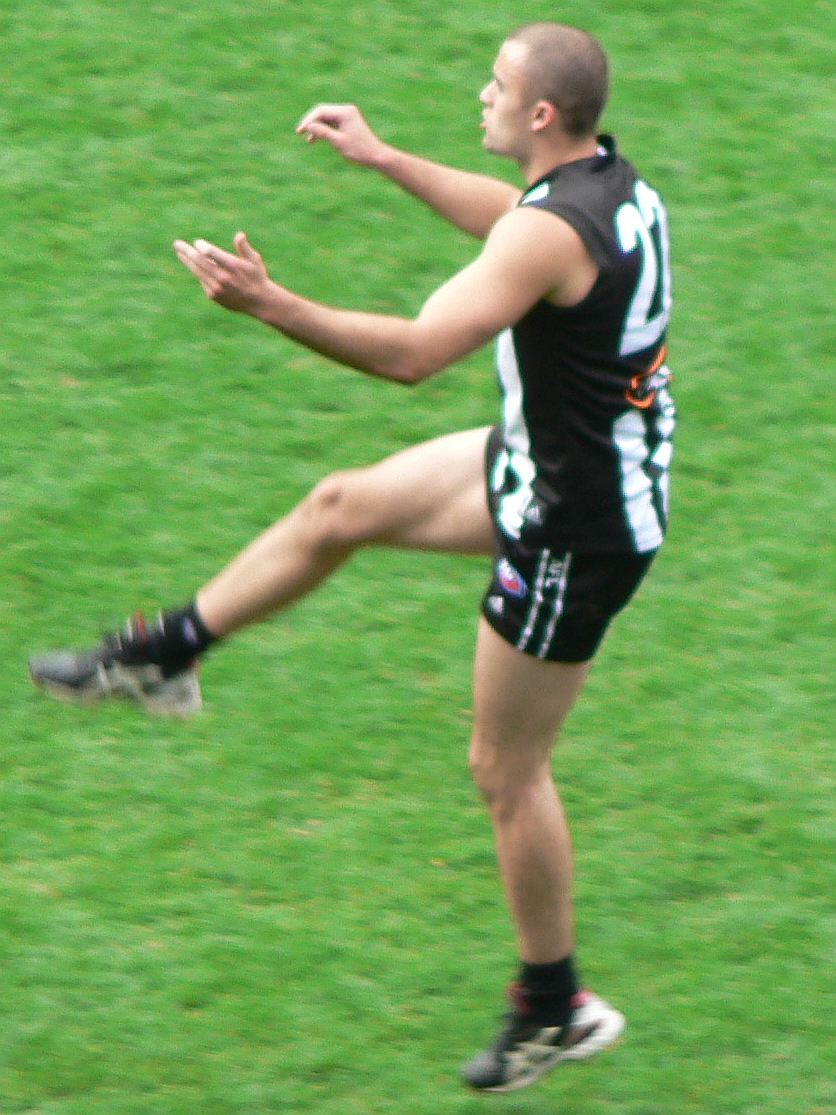
Shaw playing for Collingwood in 2006

Shaw, son of former Collingwood captain Ray, was drafted to Collingwood in the 1999 AFL draft under the father–son rule at pick no.18. He made his debut late in 2000 because of a broken collarbone, he was impressive with 16 kicks, but his form disappeared and was dropped weeks later. Shaw had suffered from chronic fatigue syndrome as a junior and carried it into his AFL career. His skills were ordinary, but his pace was an asset as a wingman. In 2001 and 2002 he only managed 1 senior game, but managed to be retained on the list. In 2003 Rhyce had experienced an improved season and played 19 games. He wore Bob Rose's number 22 with pride, his heart on his sleeve, and when Rose's death in mid-2003 came about Shaw was a very emotional man, sporting his guernsey with initials B.R above the number. Shaw, however, had a nightmare finish to the season in the Grand Final against the Brisbane Lions. In one of the more infamous highlights of any Grand Final, he fumbled the ball, slipped and fell over at a crucial moment in the game, only to have an opposing player, Alastair Lynch, gain possession of the ball and kick a goal.

In 2004 he played 16 games, but could not manage to play consistent footy, and he averaged under 10 touches per game. His slight late-season form kept him at the club once again, but pondered thoughts of why into fans heads. 2005, however, was a turning point for Shaw as he provided better skills on show and performed consistently. In the first 6 games he was averaging over 23 touches a game, including a career-best 32 on The ANZAC Day clash against Essendon, before being stretchered off the field concussed. Mid-season he would rupture his ACL and require a knee reconstruction, missing the rest of the season. He bought up a long-awaited 50th game in Round 11.

He returned mid-2006 and played 9 games, playing a similar brand of football of his improved 2005 season. He averaged just under 20 touches, and spent time in the VFL to gain back his best football touch. Shaw's 2007 season started off with a bang, with All-Australian form in the opening six rounds, before coaches applied more attention to Rhyce, and brother Heath. He averaged 23 disposals a game and more than 8 marks in that period. A hamstring injury, where he would be a late withdrawal for the Queen's Birthday match against Melbourne saw him miss five games and six weeks on the sidelines. He would return through the before breaking back into the side for four of the last five home and away games, with form not up to standard. He would be an emergency for the finals on two occasions.

Rhyce played a successful role that established him the backline or winger due to his pace in the 2008 season. He averaged 22 possessions a game in the first half of the season but slumped to a calf injury which prevented him from lining up in the team in the following weeks. He was named emergencies in most of the matches at the end of the home and away season. At the conclusion of the 2008 AFL season, Rhyce requested to move up north due to his part earlier in 2008, where he was involved with brother Heath and teammate Alan Didak in a drink driving offense. Rhyce Shaw was traded to the Sydney Swans with pick 61 from Collingwood which Collingwood received pick 46 in the AFL Draft. The trade was made official on the 10 October 2008.

=== Sydney Swans ===
His move to the Swans revitalized his career, with his run off the half-back line proving extremely potent. His contribution and value to the team was acknowledged by Shaw being officially named as part of the Swans leadership team.

In 2009, Shaw played the best football of his career as a running half back/back pocket player in the Swans' defence. He capped off the year by finishing 2nd in the Bob Skilton Medal to Ryan O'Keefe.

In 2010, Shaw began to stagnate somewhat experiencing a deterioration in his disposal efficiency playing off half-back. His form seemed to be stunted by the return of Tadhg Kennelly to the Swans' half-back line and Nick Malceski returning to the best 22 after a few years in the wilderness. In the 2nd half of the year, however, a move to the forward line seemed to reinvigorate Shaw. He kicked 2 late goals against North Melbourne to seal a win for the side and then kicked 3 goals the next week against Carlton in a very polished performance. Shaw was later moved into the middle to tag the opposition's best players and did so to good effect. He played on and limited the influence of players such as Marc Murphy, Dan Giansiracusa and Stephen Hill.

Shaw enjoyed perhaps the best season of his career in 2011, culminating in him finishing equal 2nd in the Skilton Medal with Josh Kennedy (behind Adam Goodes). He combined tight defensive and tagging with a strong rebound and run throughout the year to become one of the most consistent and well-performed Swans for the season. He was also awarded the Best Clubman Award for 2011.

Shaw followed up his 2011 season with another consistent display in the side's premiership-winning year. He was deployed as the Swans' main defensive rebounder whilst also proving to be a tight and strong small defender.

Shaw played his 200th AFL game in Round 7, 2014, as the Swans beat the Brisbane Lions by 79 points at the Gabba.

He announced in August 2015 that he would retire at the end of the season.

== Coaching career ==
=== Sydney Swans (2016–18) ===
Prior to the 2016 season, Rhys was appointed an assistant coach at Sydney until the end of 2018.

=== North Melbourne (2019–20) ===
After three years as an assistant coach at Sydney, at the end of 2018, Rhyce was appointed assistant coach at the Kangaroos. In May 2019, after 10 rounds Brad Scott suddenly resigned as senior coach. Shaw was then appointed caretaker senior coach of North Melbourne Football Club for the rest of the 2019 season. After winning four of his first five games as caretaker senior coach and garnering the support of the North Melbourne playing group, Shaw was announced as the club's permanent successor to Brad Scott as senior coach on a three-year contract.

Shaw's first full season coaching the club was 2020, a season which was heavily disrupted by the COVID-19 pandemic and saw the club relocated to south-east Queensland for most of the season. The club's performances were weak under Shaw, with a 3–14 record resulting in a second-last placing. Following the season, Shaw stepped away from the club for personal reasons, before officially resigning from his position as senior coach of North Melbourne on 22 October 2020 after only one season. Shaw was then replaced by David Noble as senior coach of North Melbourne.

=== Gold Coast Suns (2021–present) ===
On 4 January 2021, Rhyce joined Gold Coast Suns as an assistant coach in the role of Head of Development ahead of the 2021 season.

==== AFL Women's head coach (2025–present) ====
On 22 January 2025, Shaw was named senior coach of the Suns' AFL Women's team. The hiring made Shaw the first coach to hold full-time senior positions in both AFL and AFLW.

== Personal life ==
Rhyce is the son of former Collingwood captain Ray Shaw, and brother of Heath. He is also the nephew of premiership captain and Norm Smith Medallist, Tony Shaw and former Collingwood player Neville Shaw. His cousin, Brayden (son of Tony) was drafted to Collingwood, but failed to play a game before being delisted in 2005.

== Statistics ==
=== Playing statistics ===
Legend
G	Goals	K	Kicks	D	Disposals	T	Tackles
B	Behinds	H	Handballs	M	Marks

Season	Team	No.	Games	Totals							Averages (per game)						
Season	Team	No.	Games	G	B	K	H	D	M	T	G	B	K	H	D	M	T
2000	Collingwood	22	3	3	0	23	3	26	11	3	1.0	0.0	7.7	1.0	8.7	3.7	1.0
2001	Collingwood	22	1	0	0	5	2	7	2	0	0.0	0.0	5.0	2.0	7.0	2.0	0.0
2002	Collingwood	22	0	—	—	—	—	—	—	—	—	—	—	—	—	—	—
2003	Collingwood	22	19	2	0	172	64	236	75	21	0.1	0.0	9.1	3.4	12.4	3.9	1.1
2004	Collingwood	22	16	0	4	114	41	155	45	21	0.0	0.3	7.1	2.6	9.7	2.8	1.3
2005	Collingwood	22	12	4	4	141	76	217	63	11	0.3	0.3	11.8	6.3	18.1	5.3	0.9
2006	Collingwood	22	9	3	3	102	71	173	67	17	0.3	0.3	11.3	7.9	19.2	7.4	1.9
2007	Collingwood	22	14	3	2	165	77	242	83	31	0.2	0.1	11.8	5.5	17.3	5.9	2.2
2008	Collingwood	22	20	5	7	262	149	411	137	56	0.3	0.4	13.1	7.5	20.6	6.9	2.8
2009	Sydney	2	22	4	4	373	159	532	80	58	0.2	0.2	17.0	7.2	24.2	3.6	2.6
2010	Sydney	2	23	12	8	262	134	396	94	60	0.5	0.3	11.4	5.8	17.2	4.1	2.6
2011	Sydney	2	24	4	4	309	112	421	70	67	0.2	0.2	12.9	4.7	17.5	2.9	2.8
2012	Sydney	2	24	1	2	300	149	449	71	57	0.0	0.1	12.5	6.2	18.7	3.0	2.4
2013	Sydney	2	6	1	1	60	22	82	21	6	0.2	0.2	10.0	3.7	13.7	3.5	1.0
2014	Sydney	2	20	1	1	268	160	428	85	30	0.1	0.1	13.4	8.0	21.4	4.25	1.5
2015	Sydney	2	24	1	2	283	164	447	104	61	0.0	0.1	11.8	6.8	18.6	4.3	2.5
Career			237	44	42	2839	1383	4222	1008	499	0.2	0.2	12.0	5.8	17.8	4.3	2.1

=== Coaching statistics ===
Legend
W	Wins	L	Losses	D	Draws	W%	Winning percentage	LP	Ladder position	LT	League teams

Season	Team	Games	W	L	D	W %	LP	LT
2019	North Melbourne	12	7	5	0	58.3%	12	18
2020	North Melbourne	17	3	14	0	21.4%	17	18
Career totals		29	10	19	0	34.4%		
