= Steven Brosnan =

Australian rules footballer

Personal information
- Full name: Steven Brosnan
- Born: 9 October 1978 (age 48)
- Original team: Port Adelaide (SANFL)
- Draft: 57th, 1999 AFL draft
- Height: 188 cm (6 ft 2 in)
- Weight: 93 kg (205 lb)

Playing career^{1}
Years	Club	Games (Goals)
2000	Port Adelaide	1 (0)
- ^{1} Playing statistics correct to the end of 2000.

Steven Brosnan (born 9 October 1978) is a former Australian rules footballer who played with Port Adelaide in the Australian Football League (AFL).

A key position player, Brosnan played his early football with SANFL club Port Adelaide, before being recruited to the AFL by the Port Adelaide Football Club, with pick 57 in the 1999 AFL draft. He played just one senior AFL game for the Power, in round three of the 2000 AFL season, against the Western Bulldogs at Docklands Stadium.

After being delisted, Brosnan played for various clubs, including Lucindale, Wonthaggi and Waikerie.
