= Dale Baynes =

Australian rules footballer

Personal information
- Full name: Dale Baynes
- Born: 29 November 1980 (age 45)
- Original team: East Fremantle
- Height: 189 cm (6 ft 2 in)
- Weight: 93 kg (205 lb)

Playing career^{1}
Years	Club	Games (Goals)
2000	Collingwood	1 (0)
- ^{1} Playing statistics correct to the end of 2000.

Dale Baynes (born 29 November 1980) is a former Australian rules footballer who played one game for Collingwood in the Australian Football League in 2000. Originally from Geraldton, Western Australia he was recruited from East Fremantle in the West Australian Football League with the 75th selection in the 1999 AFL draft.

He currently plays for Towns Football Club in the Great Northern Football League and has represented Western Australia in the National Country Football Championships.
