= David Spriggs (footballer) =

Australian rules footballer

Personal information
- Full name: David Spriggs
- Born: 25 January 1981 (age 45)
- Original team: Beaumaris / Prahran U18
- Draft: 15th overall, 1999; Geelong; 49th overall, 2004; Sydney
- Position: Midfielder

Playing career^{1}
Years	Club	Games (Goals)
2000–2004	Geelong	64 (20)
2005	Sydney	5 (0)
Total		69 (20)
- ^{1} Playing statistics correct to the end of 2006.

Career highlights
- AFL Rising Star nominee 2000

David Spriggs (born 25 January 1981) is an Australian rules footballer with the Vermont Football Club in the Eastern Football League, who formerly played for the AFL's Geelong Football Club, Sydney Swans and the Port Melbourne Football Club in the Victorian Football League.

== Career ==
He was recruited as the number 15 draft pick in the 1999 AFL draft from Beaumaris. He made his debut for Geelong in Round 1, 2000 against Fremantle.

He was delisted by the Cats at the end of the 2004 season and nominated himself in the 2004 AFL draft where he was picked up by the Sydney Swans for pick No. 47. He made his debut for Sydney in Round 3, 2005 against the Brisbane Lions.

Spriggs failed to make a single AFL appearance in 2006, and was subsequently delisted by the Swans at the end of that season. He joined Port Melbourne in 2007.

In July 2006, Spriggs posed for Cosmopolitan magazine's Lonsdale Boys With Balls feature for the September 2006 issue.
