= Ryan Pagan =

Australian rules footballer

Personal information
- Full name: Ryan Pagan
- Born: 12 July 1977 (age 49)
- Original team: North Melbourne Reserves (VSFL)
- Draft: No. 60, 2000 Rookie Draft

Playing career^{1}
Years	Club	Games (Goals)
2000	North Melbourne	3 (0)
- ^{1} Playing statistics correct to the end of 2012.

Ryan Pagan (born 12 July 1977) is a former Australian rules footballer who played with North Melbourne in the Australian Football League (AFL) in 2000.

He is the son of North's coach at the time, Denis Pagan.

Ryan now runs a real-estate firm in the inner North West of Melbourne.
