= Troy Makepeace =

Australian rules footballer

Personal information
- Born: 6 March 1979 (age 47)
- Original team: Moe / Gippsland U18 (TAC Cup)
- Debut: Round 4, 31 March 2000, Kangaroos vs. Geelong, at Colonial Stadium
- Height: 175 cm (5 ft 9 in)
- Weight: 78 kg (172 lb)

Playing career^{1}
Years	Club	Games (Goals)
2000–2006	Kangaroos	139 (37)
- ^{1} Playing statistics correct to the end of 2006.

Career highlights
- International Rules Series 2005

Troy Makepeace (born 6 March 1979) is a former Australian rules footballer who played for the North Melbourne Kangaroos in the Australian Football League.

Drafted by the Kangaroos in the 6th round of the 1999 AFL draft, Makepeace made his AFL debut in 2000 and was a key player in their back line for many years. In 2005, he represented Australia in the International Rules Series.

The following season, Makepeace found his playing time limited, playing just 12 games. At the end of the year, he was delisted by the Kangaroos. Not picked up by an AFL club, Makepeace played for the VFL's Casey Scorpions in 2007.

Makepeace then returned to the club he was originally plucked from, the Moe Lions, and was captain-coach of the club from 2008 to 2011. Makepeace is currently thriving as an assistant coach at the Morwell Football Netball Club.(MFNC)

In June 2012, Makepeace switched codes and made his soccer debut, playing three senior games for Fortuna '60 in the Latrobe Valley Soccer League. He made his debut as a substitute against Churchill United, which Fortuna won 2-1. Across all competitions, including youth matches in which Makepeace was permitted to play, he played 15 matches.

In August 2012, Makepeace was hit by a motorist while cycling near Hazelwood North. He suffered two fractured vertebrae and required his right elbow to be reconstructed.

In an April 2020 interview with 1611 SEN, GWS player Heath Shaw said Makepeace was his favourite player.

Makepeace has also spoken out over speculation that North Melbourne might be forced to change location. Speaking with SEN in April 2021, Makepeace commented: "Honestly, I get pretty p---ed off reading it. I'm a bit over it, particularly those in the inner sanctum of the club. Obviously a lot of the loyal supporters are quite sick of it as well. I think we're an easy target."

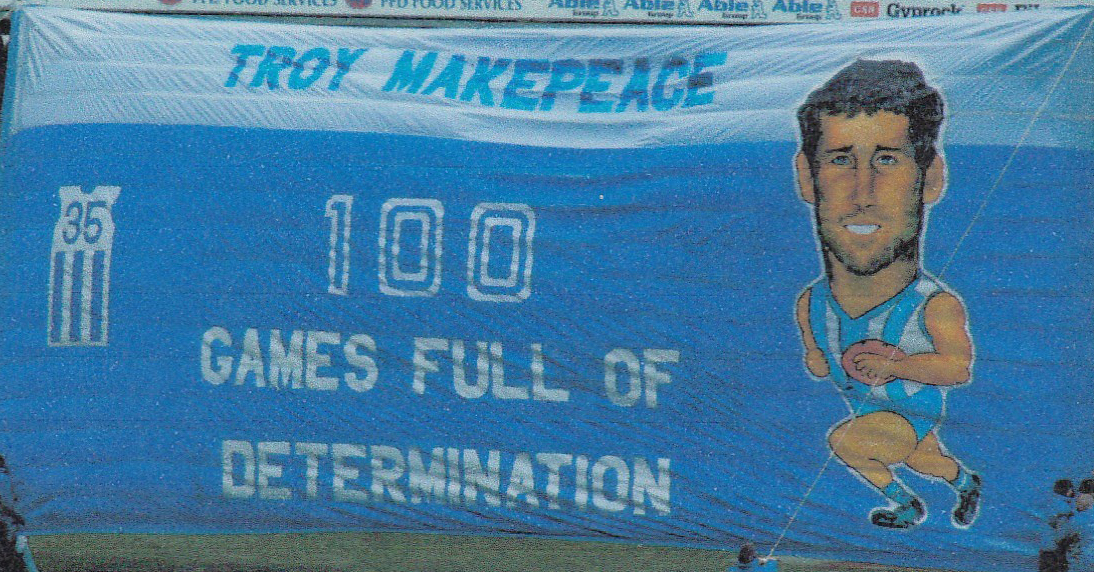
Commemorative banner for Makepeace's 100th game for North Melbourne (AFL Round 14, 2004)
