= Daniel Giansiracusa =

Australian rules footballer (born 1982)

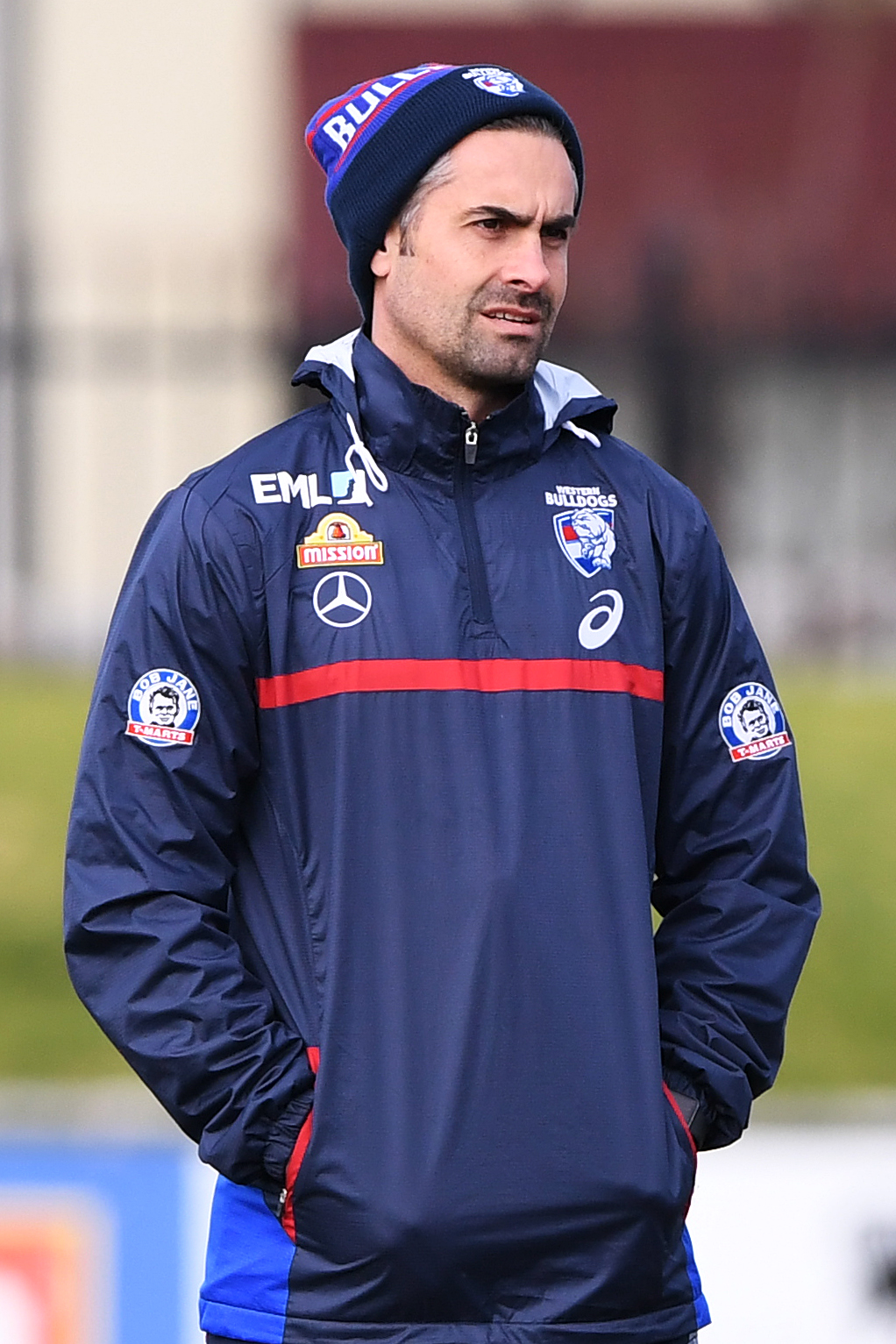
- Giansiracusa in August 2018

Personal information
- Full name: Daniel Giansiracusa
- Nicknames: Gia, Guido
- Born: 11 March 1982 (age 44); Melbourne, Victoria
- Original team: Western Jets (TAC Cup)
- Draft: 32nd overall, 1999 National Draft
- Height: 182 cm (6 ft 0 in)
- Weight: 80 kg (176 lb)
- Position: Forward

Playing career^{1}
Years	Club	Games (Goals)
2001–2014	Western Bulldogs	265 (331)
- ^{1} Playing statistics correct to the end of 2014.

Career highlights
- International Rules Series: 2005; Western Bulldogs leading goalkicker: 2012, 2013; Best Clubman: 2013; AFL Assistant Coach of the Year: 2020

Daniel Giansiracusa (born 11 March 1982) is a former Australian rules footballer who played for the Western Bulldogs in the Australian Football League (AFL). He had been used in various positions such as the midfield, half back flanks and half forward flanks. He currently serves as an assistant coach at the Hawthorn Football Club.

== Playing career ==
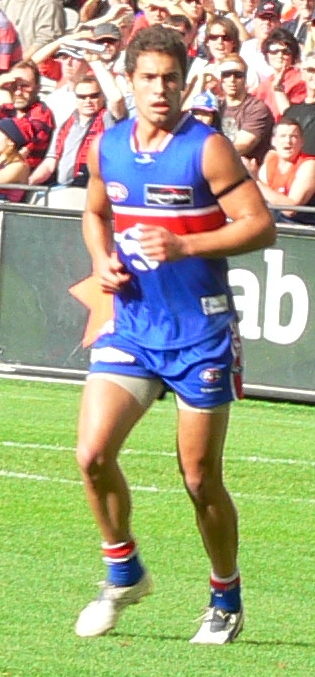
Giansiracusa playing with the Bulldogs in 2007

Giansiracusa was selected by the Bulldogs in the 1999 AFL draft with pick 32. He made his senior debut in round 11, 2001 against Adelaide at Football Park, and joined a special group of players when he goaled with his first kick.

After an exciting start to 2005 he missed 6 weeks due to injury but returned and ended up kicking 23 goals for the year. He had an outstanding game in round 18 against the Brisbane Lions collecting 27 possessions and kicking 2 goals. That same year he was chosen to represent Australia in International Rules.

Giansiracusa injured an anterior cruciate ligament (ACL) over the 2007–2008 off-season. The injury was not serious and he recovered in time for the 2008 season opener against Adelaide.

In 2010, Giansiracusa led the Bulldogs to the NAB Cup grand final. He was acting captain due to Brad Johnson being absent. He led the Bulldogs to a 40-point victory against St Kilda. That same year he finished 3rd in the Bulldogs Best and Fairest.

Giansiracusa continued to display fine form in 2011, despite the team's poor season overall. He kicked 45 goals in 20 games playing mainly as a small forward, finishing second on the goalkicking list behind Barry Hall and seventh in the club's Best and Fairest Award count. He reached a personal milestone in Round 10 when he played his 200th game for the Bulldogs.

Providing an experienced head in the Western Bulldogs forward line, Giansiracusa's reliability around goals was imperative in 2012. In the 17 games he goaled on all but one occasion, while contributing multiple majors on eight occasions. He finished the year as the club's leading goal scorer.

In 2013, Giansiracusa began to substitute more regularly matches. His ability to be substituted late in games and make meaningful impacts led to him being called the "Super Sub". In round 19, Giansiracusa kicked an amazing alley-oop goal, which was a serious contender at being crowned Goal of the Year.

In 2014, Giansiracusa played his final season. Despite having limited game time he played a vital role for the Bulldogs, especially up forward. In round 3, after receiving a free kick he kicked a goal late in the final term to put the Bulldogs in front by 2 points and effectively win them the game against Richmond. Giansiracusa played his last game in round 23 against GWS, despite Giansiracusa playing well and kicking 2 goals the Bulldogs lost by 6 points.

== Justin Koschitzke incident ==
In round 6, 2006, against St Kilda, midway during the third quarter the Western Bulldogs were heading downfield when Giansiracusa clashed heads with Justin Koschitzke, resulting in both players lying motionless for several minutes. Giansiracusa managed to get up but Koschitzke could not. Despite the severity of the incident, the AFL Tribunal decided Giansiracusa had no case to answer for this bump.

== Coaching career ==
After retiring from playing, Giansiracusa became a forwards coach at the Western Bulldogs in 2015. In 2019 he was appointed as the senior coach of the Footscray VFL side. In 2020 due to the disrupted season he coached the Bulldogs' match simulation games and worked on opposition analysis. He was named as the AFL Coaches Association, Assistant Coach of the Year for 2020. In 2021 he joined the Essendon Football Club as an assistant coach.

After unsuccessfully applying for multiple AFL senior coaching jobs, Giansiracusa left Essendon at the end of the 2025 AFL season, moving to Hawthorn for the 2026 season.

== Statistics ==
Legend
G	Goals	K	Kicks	D	Disposals	T	Tackles
B	Behinds	H	Handballs	M	Marks

Season	Team	No.	Games	Totals							Averages (per game)						
Season	Team	No.	Games	G	B	K	H	D	M	T	G	B	K	H	D	M	T
2001	Western Bulldogs	13	12	10	6	95	54	149	59	15	0.8	0.5	7.9	4.5	12.4	4.9	1.3
2002	Western Bulldogs	13	22	25	21	234	135	369	122	34	1.1	1.0	10.6	6.1	16.8	5.5	1.5
2003	Western Bulldogs	13	21	20	11	222	124	346	85	41	1.0	0.5	10.6	5.9	16.5	4.0	2.0
2004	Western Bulldogs	13	15	5	11	171	91	262	57	51	0.3	0.7	11.4	6.1	17.5	3.8	3.4
2005	Western Bulldogs	13	17	23	17	228	128	356	102	25	1.4	1.0	13.4	7.5	20.9	6.0	1.5
2006	Western Bulldogs	13	16	13	3	197	124	321	97	39	0.8	0.2	12.3	7.8	20.1	6.1	2.4
2007	Western Bulldogs	13	22	22	13	252	150	402	131	61	1.0	0.6	11.5	6.8	18.3	6.0	2.8
2008	Western Bulldogs	13	25	33	11	330	200	530	163	70	1.3	0.4	13.2	8.0	21.2	6.5	2.8
2009	Western Bulldogs	13	18	21	12	218	146	364	92	48	1.2	0.7	12.1	8.1	20.2	5.1	2.7
2010	Western Bulldogs	13	25	35	13	297	192	489	130	94	1.4	0.5	11.9	7.7	19.6	5.2	3.8
2011	Western Bulldogs	13	20	45	18	229	135	364	114	56	2.3	0.9	11.5	6.8	18.2	5.7	2.8
2012	Western Bulldogs	13	17	28	15	161	95	256	63	37	1.6	0.9	9.5	5.6	15.1	3.7	2.2
2013	Western Bulldogs	13	20	36	16	185	106	291	92	36	1.8	0.8	9.3	5.3	14.6	4.6	1.8
2014	Western Bulldogs	13	15	15	10	100	63	163	41	18	1.0	0.7	6.7	4.2	10.9	2.7	1.2
Career			265	331	177	2919	1743	4662	1348	625	1.2	0.7	11.0	6.6	17.6	5.1	2.4

== Personal life ==
Giansiracusa attended Altona Meadows Primary School and Emmanuel College. He married his longtime partner, Kelly Tisdale, in December 2007. The couple currently have two children: daughter Ruby Iris (born in November 2008), and son Otis.
