= Danny Roach =

Australian rules footballer, born 1982

Personal information
- Born: 6 January 1982 (age 44); Tasmania
- Original team: Tasmania U18
- Debut: Round 4, 20 April 2001, Collingwood vs. Richmond, at Melbourne Cricket Ground

Playing career^{1}
Years	Club	Games (Goals)
2001	Collingwood	1 (0)
- ^{1} Playing statistics correct to the end of 2001.

Danny Roach (born 6 January 1982) is a former Australian rules football player who played for the Collingwood Football Club in the Australian Football League (AFL) in 2001.

Roach grew up playing for Tasmanian clubs Beaconsfield and Northern Bombers, as well as the Tassie Mariners. He was drafted by Collingwood in the first round pick in the 1999 AFL draft. He played his debut season at the club for Victorian Football League club Williamstown (Collingwood's affiliate team). He debuted for Collingwood in round 4, 2001. It marked his first and only AFL game.
