= Mitch Hahn =

Australian rules footballer

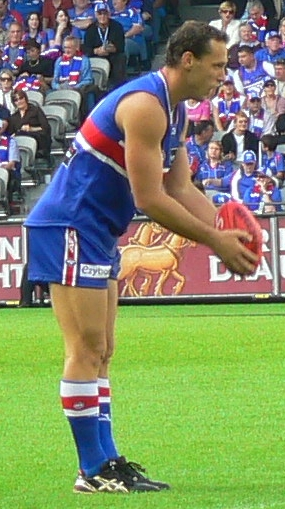

Personal information
- Full name: Mitchell Hahn
- Nickname: Frank
- Born: 10 May 1981 (age 45)
- Original team: Zillmere Eagles (QAFL)
- Draft: No. 37, 1999 National Draft, Western Bulldogs; No. 70, 2011 Rookie Draft, Western Bulldogs
- Height: 188 cm (6 ft 2 in)
- Weight: 99 kg (218 lb)

Playing career^{1}
Years	Club	Games (Goals)
2000–2011	Western Bulldogs	181 (164)

Coaching career^{3}
Years	Club	Games (W–L–D)
2017–2022	Brisbane (NEAFL, VFL)	90 (65–24–1)
- ^{1} Playing statistics correct to the end of 2011.^{3} Coaching statistics correct as of 2016.

Mitchell Hahn (born 10 May 1981) is a former professional Australian rules footballer who played 181 games for the Western Bulldogs in the Australian Football League (AFL). He was the backline coach at the Brisbane Lions from October 2013 to 2016, and was the coach of the reserves team in the NEAFL and the VFL from 2017 to 2022 before being replaced by Ben Hudson.

Originally from Brisbane in Queensland, he was chosen in the 1999 National AFL draft at number 37, a trade the Bulldogs had received from Richmond in exchange for Leon Cameron. As at the end of the 2005 season was part of the Bulldogs' leadership group.

The 2006 Record describes Hahn as being "immensely strong" with a "bullocking style of play". During a win against the Brisbane Lions at the Gabba in Round 18 2006, he hyperextended and severely injured his left knee upon landing after a running jump and laid on the ground clutching it. The game was held up as he was taken off on a stretcher. The injury forced him to miss the rest of the season and earlier parts of 2007. He was delisted by the Western Bulldogs on 10 November 2010, but was redrafted only through the Rookie Draft only weeks later. He has a son named Levi.

== Statistics ==
Legend
G	Goals	K	Kicks	D	Disposals	T	Tackles
B	Behinds	H	Handballs	M	Marks

Season	Team	No.	Games	Totals							Averages (per game)							Votes
Season	Team	No.	Games	G	B	K	H	D	M	T	G	B	K	H	D	M	T	Votes
2000	Western Bulldogs	37	8	0	0	31	31	62	20	3	0.0	0.0	3.9	3.9	7.8	2.5	0.4	0
2001	Western Bulldogs	8	11	1	0	58	42	100	28	9	0.1	0.0	5.3	3.8	9.1	2.5	0.8	0
2002	Western Bulldogs	8	10	2	5	59	44	103	27	27	0.2	0.5	5.9	4.4	10.3	2.7	2.7	3
2003	Western Bulldogs	8	21	11	16	182	150	332	86	55	0.5	0.8	8.7	7.1	15.8	4.1	2.6	4
2004	Western Bulldogs	8	22	18	14	190	95	285	80	48	0.8	0.6	8.6	4.3	13.0	3.6	2.2	2
2005	Western Bulldogs	8	19	21	22	162	91	253	65	44	1.1	1.2	8.5	4.8	13.3	3.4	2.3	2
2006	Western Bulldogs	8	11	12	15	103	47	150	40	29	1.1	1.4	9.4	4.3	13.6	3.6	2.6	0
2007	Western Bulldogs	8	10	12	8	66	50	116	25	34	1.2	0.8	6.6	5.0	11.6	2.5	3.4	0
2008	Western Bulldogs	8	25	34	23	189	134	323	80	81	1.4	0.9	7.6	5.4	12.9	3.2	3.2	3
2009	Western Bulldogs	8	25	38	14	200	158	358	101	86	1.5	0.6	8.0	6.3	14.3	4.0	3.4	4
2010	Western Bulldogs	8	19	15	16	181	130	311	96	54	0.8	0.8	9.5	6.8	16.4	5.1	2.8	2
Career			181	164	133	1421	972	2393	648	470	0.9	0.7	7.9	5.4	13.2	3.6	2.6	20
