= Ricky O'Loughlin =

Australian rules footballer

Personal information
- Full name: Ricky O'Loughlin
- Born: 4 July 1979 (age 47)
- Original team: Port Adelaide
- Height: 183 cm (6 ft 0 in)
- Weight: 84 kg (185 lb)
- Position: Half forward

Playing career^{1}
| Years | Club | Games (Goals) |
| 2000–2001 | Adelaide | 9 (2) |
- ^{1} Playing statistics correct to the end of 2001.

Ricky O'Loughlin (born 4 July 1979) is a former indigenous Australian rules footballer who played with Adelaide in the Australian Football League (AFL).

O'Loughlin made his senior debut in 1999 in the South Australian National Football League (SANFL) with Port Adelaide and was drafted by Adelaide at pick 51 in the 1999 AFL draft. A half forward, O'Loughlin played his first AFL match at the Gabba, five rounds into the 2000 AFL season, with Jonathan Brown, Aaron Shattock and Rhett Biglands also making their league debuts.

In two seasons, O'Loughlin managed only nine appearances and spent most of his time in the SANFL. He was rookie listed at his brother Michael's club Sydney Swans in 2002 but could not break into the seniors.

O’Loughlin played in the 1999 Port Adelaide Premiership team in the SANFL.
