= Ezra Poyas =

Australian rules footballer (born 1981)

Personal information
- Full name: Ezra Poyas
- Born: 24 March 1981 (age 45)
- Draft: 22nd overall, 1999 AFL draft 43rd overall, 2002 Rookie Draft
- Height: 184 cm (6 ft 0 in)
- Weight: 86 kg (190 lb)
- Position: Forward / Midfielder

Playing career^{1}
Years	Club	Games (Goals)
2000–2002	Richmond	9 (6)
2003	Melbourne	0 (0)
Total		9 (0)
- ^{1} Playing statistics correct to the end of 2002.

Ezra Poyas (born 24 March 1981) is an Australian rules footballer who played in the Australian Football League (AFL) and is a former captain of Victorian Football League (VFL) club Sandringham. Poyas is a former captain of the Victoria Metropolitan side at both Under 18 & Under 16 age groups, and is Jewish.

== Career ==
Poyas captained Vic Metro at both Under-18 and Under-16 age level, and was also selected as an Under-18 All-Australian and in the TAC Cup Team of the Year in 1999. He was drafted by Richmond at Pick 22 in the 1999 National Draft from the Sandringham Dragons, and went on to play nine games as a forward from 2000–2002, however a serious shoulder injury saw Poyas delisted by the Tigers at the end of the 2002 season. While playing for Richmond's VFL-affiliate, Coburg, Poyas was a joint-winner (with Carlton's Brett Backwell) in 2001 of the J. J. Liston Trophy, awarded annually to the best and fairest player of the VFL.

Ezra was drafted again by Melbourne at Pick 43 in the 2002 Rookie Draft, however did not get the opportunity to play a senior game with the Demons. He was delisted at the end of 2003, despite finishing third in VFL-affiliate Sandringham's Best and Fairest count.

Poyas remained at Sandringham as a VFL-listed player, and played in all three of Sandringham's hat-trick premierships wins (2004–06). He was selected for the VFL representative team that played a West Australian Football League team in May 2007.

In 2012, Poyas played at Broadbeach in the NEAFL Northern Conference (previously known as the QAFL), where he finished runner up in the league Best and Fairest, despite missing six games throughout the season.
