= Kane Munro =

Australian rules footballer

Personal information
- Full name: Kane Munro
- Born: 11 March 1982 (age 44)
- Original team: Bendigo Pioneers
- Draft: 41st, 1999 AFL draft
- Height: 182 cm (6 ft 0 in)
- Weight: 75 kg (165 lb)

Playing career^{1}
Years	Club	Games (Goals)
2000–2003	West Coast Eagles	18 (11)
- ^{1} Playing statistics correct to the end of 2003.

Career highlights
- East Perth premiership side 2000, 2001

Kane Munro (born 11 March 1982) is an Australian rules footballer who played with the West Coast Eagles in the Australian Football League (AFL).

Munro grew up in Walpeup but completed his schooling in Bendigo, where he played for the Pioneers. A midfielder and half forward, he was recruited by the West Coast Eagles in the 1999 AFL draft at selection 41. He made just two appearances in the 2000 AFL season but contributed to East Perth's win in the WAFL grand final. The following season he played in another WAFL premiership team and from seven further AFL games could only manage a total of 39 disposals. Despite playing just twice in the 2002 home and away season, Munro was picked in the team for the elimination final against Essendon at Docklands and kicked three goals in a losing cause. He however struggled to have an impact in his six games in 2003, largely due to a shoulder injury sustained in a training accident.

From 2002 he had played his WAFL football at Swan Districts and continued at the club in 2004 after being delisted by West Coast. He then returned to Victoria and joined the Mallee Football League.
