= Ben Cunningham (Australian footballer) =

Australian rules footballer (born 1981)

Personal information
- Full name: Benjamin Joseph Cunningham
- Born: 22 November 1981 (age 44)
- Original team: Claremont (WAFL)
- Debut: Round 22, 2000, Fremantle vs. Brisbane, at The Gabba

Playing career^{1}
Years	Club	Games (Goals)
2000–2004	Fremantle	33 (19)
- ^{1} Playing statistics correct to the end of 2004.

Benjamin Joseph Cunningham (born 22 November 1981) is an Australian rules footballer who played for the Fremantle Dockers in the Australian Football League (AFL) between 2000 and 2004. He was drafted from the Claremont in the West Australian Football League as the 49th selection in the 1999 AFL draft and played mainly as a midfielder.

Cunningham is best remembered for kicking a goal from 50 m in the final minute of the game against St Kilda in Round 2, 2002 at Subiaco Oval, to put Fremantle ahead for the first time in the match. he was delisted at the end of the 2004 season.

His other notable item was his afro hairstyle which he grew in the 2003 preseason, and although he did not play many games with it due to injury he was a much loved character at the club. It was used as his official AFL photograph for the 2003 season.
