= Paul Dimattina =

Australian rules footballer

Personal information
- Born: 22 November 1974 (age 51)
- Original team: Sandringham Zebras(VFA)/Marcellin College
- Debut: Round 18, 6 August 1995, Footscray vs. Carlton, at Princes Park
- Height: 180 cm (5 ft 11 in)
- Weight: 84 kg (13 st 3 lb; 185 lb)

Playing career^{1}
Years	Club	Games (Goals)
1995–2003	Footscray/Western Bulldogs	131 (56)
- ^{1} Playing statistics correct to the end of 2003.

Paul Dimattina (born 22 November 1974) is a former Australian rules footballer who represented Western Bulldogs in the Australian Football League (AFL). Dimattina is of Italian descent and the son of former Richmond and North Melbourne footballer Frank Dimattina. He is a brother of former Collingwood player Andy Dimattina.

Dimattina played for Richmond at the under-19 level as a 16-year-old in 1991, and was drafted by the Tigers with the final selection in the 1991 AFL draft. He played reserves football for them in 1992, but never played an AFL game for Richmond. During 1993 and 1994 he played for Victorian Football Association (VFA) team Sandringham, as well as some games for the Carlton and Essendon reserves teams. Drafted by the Footscray Football Club (later Western Bulldogs) with the 26th selection in the 1995 pre-season draft, Dimattina made his AFL debut late in the 1995 season. Dimattina was a high possession winner for the Bulldogs throughout his career. He played 131 games for the Bulldogs until he was delisted at the end of the 2003 season.

== Post AFL career ==
In 2005, Dimattina moved to the Gold Coast, Queensland, where he played with the Southport Sharks. He scored six goals and best afield in the Queensland State League Grand Final before retiring from the Sharks and returning to Melbourne.

== Post-football ==
Following his football career, Dimattina became involved in the hospitality industry. He and his family own and run the Dimattina's and Il Gambero restaurants in Lygon Street, Carlton, Society Restaurant in Melbourne City, the Blue Train cafe at Southgate in Southbank, as well as two restaurants on the Gold Coast, Queensland. In 2009 his restaurant Il Gambero mysteriously burnt down.

In 2021, Dimattina was part of the formation of the Victorians Party. The party dissolved before the 2022 state election, which they planned to contest.
