= Caydn Beetham =

Australian rules footballer

Personal information
- Full name: Caydn Beetham
- Born: 11 March 1982 (age 44)
- Original team: Oakleigh Chargers/Xavier College
- Draft: 9th, 1999 National draft
- Height: 183 cm (6 ft 0 in)
- Weight: 86 kg (190 lb)

Playing career^{1}
Years	Club	Games (Goals)
2000–2002	St Kilda	37 (9)
- ^{1} Playing statistics correct to the end of 2002.

Caydn Beetham (born 11 March 1982) is a former Australian rules footballer who played with St Kilda in the Australian Football League (AFL).

Beetham was a midfielder, taken at pick nine in the 1999 AFL draft from the Oakleigh Chargers in the TAC Cup.

He fell seriously ill in his first year with St Kilda but managed to make nine appearances in the second half of the season.

The following year, in round five, he was nominated for the 2001 AFL Rising Star award after amassing 23 disposals against Carlton, a performance that would also win him two Brownlow Medal votes. Beetham, who had Scheuermann's disease, played a total of 20 games that season and was St Kilda's fourth leading disposal getter.

In 2002 he struggled for form and at the end of the year announced a surprise retirement from AFL football.
