= Royce Vardy =

Australian rules footballer (born 1980)

Personal information
- Full name: Royce Vardy
- Born: 3 May 1980 (age 46)
- Original team: Devon-Welshpool-Won Wron-Woodside
- Height: 191 cm (6 ft 3 in)
- Weight: 94 kg (207 lb)

Playing career^{1}
Years	Club	Games (Goals)
2000–2003	Richmond	34 (3)
- ^{1} Playing statistics correct to the end of 2003.

Royce Vardy (born 3 May 1980) is an Australian rules footballer who played for Richmond between 2000 and 2003.

He was drafted in the 2000 Rookie Draft with the 21st selection from the Devon-Welshpool-Won Wron-Woodside Football Club in the Alberton Football League. He played 34 games in four seasons at the Tigers before he was delisted at the end of the 2003 season.

In December 2001 he was charged with drink driving, which resulted in his club's major sponsor, the Transport Accident Commission, threatening to reduce it sponsorship of the club.

He is the second cousin of Geelong's Nathan Vardy.
