= Aaron Fiora =

Australian rules footballer, born 1981

Personal information
- Full name: Aaron Fiora
- Born: 19 April 1981 (age 45)
- Original team: Port Adelaide (SANFL)
- Draft: 3rd overall, 1999; Richmond
- Height: 186 cm (6 ft 1 in)
- Weight: 79 kg (174 lb)
- Position: Midfielder

Playing career^{1}
Years	Club	Games (Goals)
2000–2004	Richmond	78 (25)
2005–2008	St Kilda	62 (33)
Total		140 (58)
- ^{1} Playing statistics correct to the end of 2008.

Career highlights
- Pre-Season Premiership 2008

Aaron Fiora (born 19 April 1981) is a former Australian rules footballer who played for Richmond and St Kilda in the Australian Football League (AFL).

== Richmond career ==
Originally from Naracoorte, South Australia, Fiora played his junior football with Port Adelaide Football Club in the South Australian National Football League (SANFL) and made his senior debut with Port Adelaide in 1999.

Fiora was selected in the 1999 AFL draft at pick number three by the Richmond Football Club. Fiora made his AFL debut in 2000, playing mainly as a wingman.

== St Kilda career ==
At the end of 2004 Fiora was traded to St Kilda as part of a deal involving Troy Simmonds and Heath Black. He was still a fringe player but played several solid games in 2005 before a quieter 2006 AFL season as he struggled with form despite playing 17 matches.

Fiora was retained when new coach Ross Lyon took over in 2007 and was given the number 17 jumper, previously worn by tough midfielder Stephen Powell. Under Lyon's tutelage, Fiora enjoyed an excellent and consistent season, playing in all 22 matches. However, after playing 10 matches in 2008, including a final, Fiora was delisted by St Kilda.
