= Patrick Wiggins (footballer) =

Australian rules footballer

Personal information
- Born: 9 February 1981 (age 45)
- Original team: Tassie Mariners
- Debut: Round 3, 1994, Western Bulldogs vs. Kangaroos
- Height: 196 cm (6 ft 5 in)
- Weight: 99 kg (218 lb)

Playing career^{1}
Years	Club	Games (Goals)
2000–2003	Western Bulldogs	12 (5)
- ^{1} Playing statistics correct to the end of 2003.

Patrick Wiggins (born 9 February 1981) is a former Australian rules footballer, who played for the Western Bulldogs in the Australian Football League (AFL).

He was recruited in the third round of the 1999 AFL draft, selection number 35 overall, and made his debut in round 15 of the 2000 AFL season, but only managed to play just two games that year. In 2001, he managed just one game against Port Adelaide in Round 6, and in 2002 just one game against Collingwood in round 22.

In 2003 he managed to play seven games, including scoring three goals in a match against Melbourne in Round 18. However, after struggling for first team selection, at the end of the 2003 AFL season, he was delisted by the club after playing a total of twelve games and scoring five goals.

He is the brother of former Carlton football player Simon Wiggins, and is married to Sarah Dalinkiewicz.
