= Marcus Baldwin =

Australian rules footballer

Personal information
- Born: 24 October 1979 (age 47)
- Original teams: Assumption College/ Finley football club
- Height: 196 cm (6 ft 5 in)
- Weight: 90 kg (198 lb)

Playing career^{1}
Years	Club	Games (Goals)
2000–2001	Geelong	5 (5)
- ^{1} Playing statistics correct to the end of 2001.

Career highlights
- 3 goals first 3 kicks

Marcus Baldwin (born 24 October 1979) is a former Australian rules footballer for the Geelong Football Club in the Australian Football League (AFL), playing five games between 2000 and 2001.
