= Josh Fraser =

Australian rules footballer (born 1982)

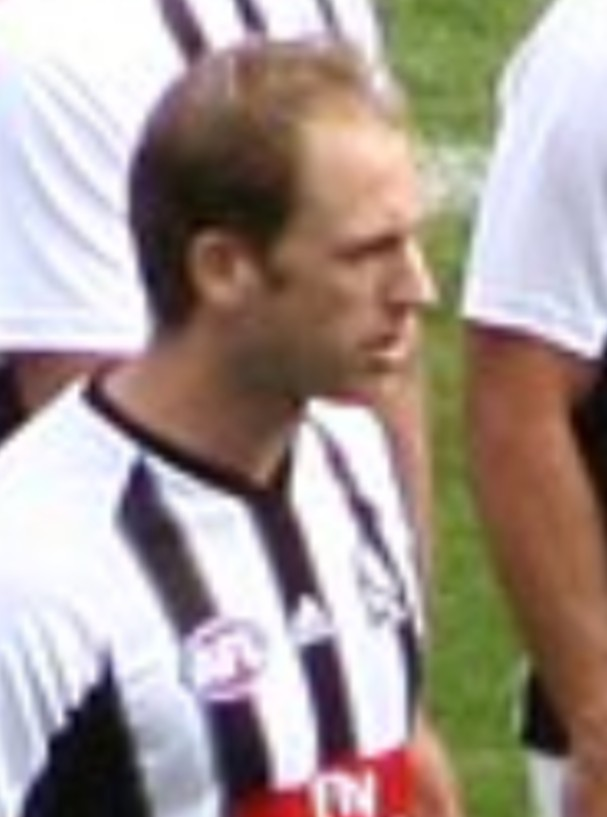
- Fraser with Collingwood in April 2008

Personal information
- Full name: Joshua Fraser
- Nickname: Frase
- Born: 5 January 1982 (age 44)
- Original team: Seville YVMDFL/Mansfield Murray Bushrangers (TAC Cup)
- Draft: No.1, 1999 national draft
- Height: 202 cm (6 ft 8 in)
- Weight: 100 kg (220 lb)
- Position: Ruckman

Playing career^{1}
Years	Club	Games (Goals)
2000–2010	Collingwood	200 (156)
2011–2012	Gold Coast	18 (12)
Total		218 (168)

Representative team honours^{2}
Years	Team	Games (Goals)
2008	Victoria	1

Coaching career^{3}
Years	Club	Games (W–L–D)
2026–	Carlton	16 (12–3–1)
- ^{1} Playing statistics correct to the end of 2011.^{2} Representative statistics correct as of 2008.^{3} Coaching statistics correct as of round 23, 2026.

Career highlights
- 2000 AFL Rising Star nominee; Collingwood Best First Year Player 2000; Collingwood Vice-Captain 2008

Joshua Fraser (born 5 January 1982) is an Australian rules football coach and former player who currently serves as the senior coach of the Carlton Football Club in the Australian Football League (AFL). He previously played professionally for the Collingwood Football Club and the Gold Coast Suns.

== Playing career ==
=== Collingwood ===
From Mansfield via Murray U18, Fraser was the number one pick in the 1999 National Draft, going to Collingwood. Fraser played 21 games in his first season, and won an AFL Rising Star nomination. He played all 25 games in 2002, kicked 37 goals and played in the Grand Final team, kicking three goals, following a three-goal haul in the Preliminary Final. In 2003, he tallied over 340 disposals, 300 hit-outs and 20 goals.

Fraser played all 23 games in 2006, having 341 hit-outs for the year, his best return. He kicked 16 goals and, per game, averaged more than 17 touches, more than seven marks, and 15 hit-outs. He finished fourth in the Copeland Trophy, along with Heath Shaw, only three votes behind the eventual winner, Alan Didak.

In 2007, Fraser did not miss a game until Round 20 against Melbourne, his second-last game for the season. He returned for the Elimination Final win against Sydney before withdrawing late against West Coast the next week, his last game for the season.

In 2008, Fraser was named Scott Burns' vice-captain.

In 2010, Fraser played nine games for the club, and lost his first-choice ruckman position to the new recruit, Darren Jolly. Fraser played his 200th game for Collingwood in the round 22 clash against Hawthorn.

Fraser played for Collingwood from 2000 until 2010, for a total of 200 games and 156 goals.

=== Gold Coast Suns ===
At the conclusion of the 2010 season, Fraser was picked up by Gold Coast, ending his tenure with Collingwood. In Fraser's first season at the Suns he played 16 games, with an average of 14.8 disposals and 13.3 hit outs per game. His main role at the Suns was to support and develop the young, emerging ruckmen at the club.

Fraser's AFL playing career ended when he resigned from the Gold Coast Suns on 29 August 2012. Fraser played for Gold Coast Suns from 2011 until 2012 where he played a total of 18 games and kicked 12 goals for the club.

== Coaching career ==
Following the end of his playing career in 2012, Fraser expressed interest in football coaching roles and stated that wanted to establish a long-term coaching career. He has completed two coaching courses; Level Two Coaches Course and Next Coach Program.

In January 2014, Fraser commenced his coaching career when he was appointed coach of the Gold Coast Suns' reserves team that played in the North East Australian Football League (NEAFL). He remained on the Gold Coast in 2015 where he played local football for the Labrador Tigers and was highly influential in their first ever QAFL premiership victory that year, which was also the first premiership win in Fraser's football career.

=== Carlton ===
He signed to serve as an assistant coach in the role of development coach at the Carlton Football Club in 2016 under senior coach Brendon Bolton, and within that role served as coach of its VFL-affiliate club, the Northern Blues. He remained with the club until the start of the 2020 season, at which point the impacts of the COVID-19 pandemic saw Carlton end its connection with the Northern Blues and made Fraser redundant. In 2021, the VFL club re-established itself under its previous identity, the Northern Bullants, and Fraser remained with the club as its senior coach.

=== Collingwood ===
Having left the Bullants at the end of the 2021 season, Fraser was appointed coach of Collingwood's VFL team ahead of the 2023 season and as assistant coach in the role of Head of Development under senior coach Craig McRae. Fraser departed the Collingwood Football Club at the end of the 2025 AFL season.

=== Return to Carlton ===
Fraser returned to the Carlton Football Club as an assistant coach in the role of forwards coach under senior coach Michael Voss for the 2026 season. From round 10, following Voss' resignation as senior coach, Fraser was appointed as caretaker senior coach of Carlton for the remainder of the 2026 season. Following the round 22 victory over the Saints, and with a 10–2 win loss record as caretaker senior coach, Fraser officially put his hand up to enter the process for the permanent position along with a short-list of four other candidates. Fraser was appointed full-time senior coach of Carlton in August 2026.

== Personal life ==
Fraser married long time girlfriend Kylie Sutcliffe in December 2008 in Port Melbourne. They have 2 children, Ted (born in 2009) and Emmy (born in 2013).

In 2013, Fraser was a part-time AFL commentator on ABC radio.
