= Andrew Crowell =

Australian rules footballer, born 1977

Personal information
- Full name: Andrew Crowell
- Born: 15 August 1977 (age 49)
- Original team: Woodville-West Torrens
- Height: 189 cm (6 ft 2 in)
- Weight: 89 kg (196 lb)

Playing career^{1}
Years	Club	Games (Goals)
2000–2003	Adelaide	44 (15)
- ^{1} Playing statistics correct to the end of 2003.

Andrew Crowell (born 15 August 1977) is a former Australian rules footballer who played in the Australian Football League. He played 44 games with Adelaide before rupturing his ACL while playing in the SANFL. He was delisted at the end of the 2003 season.

After working with the Adelaide Crows post retirement he was involved in the AFL Foundation Ladder program, which aims to fight youth homelessness.

Then after working with the AFL Players Association, Andrew accepted a role with the Brisbane Lions Football Club, as Head of Personal Excellence & Wellbeing.
