= Jonathon Robran =

Australian rules footballer (born 1972)

Personal information
- Full name: Jonathon Paul Robran
- Born: 21 October 1972 (age 54)
- Original team: Norwood (SANFL)
- Draft: 11th, 1992 AFL draft
- Height: 196 cm (6 ft 5 in)
- Weight: 96 kg (212 lb)

Playing career^{1}
Years	Club	Games (Goals)
1995–1999	Hawthorn	75 (6)
2000–2001	Essendon	8 (3)
Total		83 (9)
- ^{1} Playing statistics correct to the end of 2001.

Jonathon Robran (born 21 October 1972) is a former Australian rules footballer who played with Hawthorn and Essendon in the Australian Football League (AFL).

Robran was mostly a key position defender during his league career but could also play as a ruckman. He is the son of South Australian football great Barrie Robran and the younger brother of Adelaide player Matthew Robran.

Although he was selected in the 1992 AFL draft, with Hawthorn's first pick and 11th overall, Robran didn't play an AFL games until 1995. He suffered from shoulder problems in 1996 but didn't miss a single games in the 1997 AFL season and continued to be a regular fixture in the team over the next two years.

Promising young key defenders, Trent Croad and Jonathan Hay, were making it difficult for Robran to claim a spot down back and in 1999 he was traded to Essendon. In a trade involving three clubs, Essendon gave Andrew Ukovic to Collingwood but received both Robran and draft selection 40, used on David Hille. Hawthorn acquired two draft picks from Collingwood, which would be used on Tim Clarke and Chance Bateman.

With Essendon winning their first 20 games of the 2000 AFL season, on the way to their 16th premiership, Robran could only manage four appearances during the year. He played once early in the year and was then stuck in the seconds until being called into the team to replace an injured Dustin Fletcher at full-back for the final three home and away matches.

Delisted at the end of the 2001 season, Robran returned to his original club, Norwood, where he would play until 2004.
