= Leigh Colbert =

Australian rules footballer, born 1975

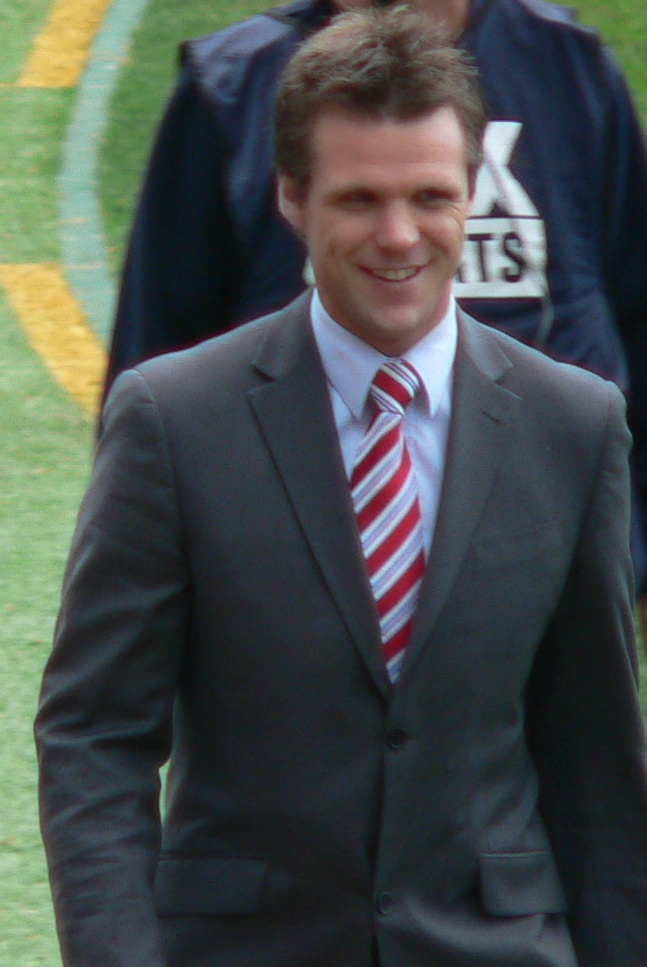
- Colbert in July 2010

Personal information
- Full name: Leigh Colbert
- Born: 7 June 1975 (age 51)
- Original team: South Bendigo
- Draft: 18th overall, 1992; Geelong
- Height: 192 cm (6 ft 4 in)
- Weight: 91 kg (201 lb)
- Position: Half-back / Fullback

Playing career^{1}
Years	Club	Games (Goals)
1993–1999	Geelong	105 (50)
2000–2005	Kangaroos	104 (14)
Total		209 (64)
- ^{1} Playing statistics correct to the end of 2005.

Career highlights
- Geelong captain: 1999; AFL Rising Star nominee: 1993

Leigh Colbert (born 7 June 1975) is a former Australian rules footballer for the Geelong Football Club and the Kangaroos in the Australian Football League (AFL).

== AFL career ==
=== 1993–1999: Geelong ===
He made his debut with Geelong in 1993 and became a fearless player, usually playing off half-back, but then found his way as a key-position player.

He was awarded Geelong's captaincy in 1999, but did not play a game that season due to injury. The falling out between the club and Colbert caused great controversy. He was traded for Cameron Mooney and draft picks that yielded, amongst others, six-time All Australian and two-time Best and Fairest winner Corey Enright. Mooney retired a dual premiership player with the Cats, and Enright retired as a three-time premiership player.

=== 2000–2005: Kangaroos ===
In 2000, Colbert moved to the Kangaroos, mostly holding up full-back or centre half-back.

In 2004, Colbert was appointed the Kangaroos delegate for the AFL Players Association (AFLPA). In 2005, Colbert announced his retirement.

== Post-football career ==
In 2006, Colbert joined the West Coast Eagles as one of their back-room staff. It was on a part-time basis, based in Melbourne.

He was a boundary rider for Fox Sports, including post-match interviews and one-on-one interviews for Fox Sports AFL of the Ablett brothers, and a one-on-one interview with Adam Simpson on his 250th game for the Kangaroos.

In 2009, he was a flying instructor at Moorabbin Flight Services at Moorabbin Airport, and also a pilot for an air freight service at Moorabbin Airport, before becoming a pilot with Tigerair Australia.

In 2020, he was announced as the new licensee of two McDonald's franchises in Mildura and Irymple after the former licensees were ousted in a racism scandal.
