= Simon Godfrey =

Australian rules footballer (born 1980)

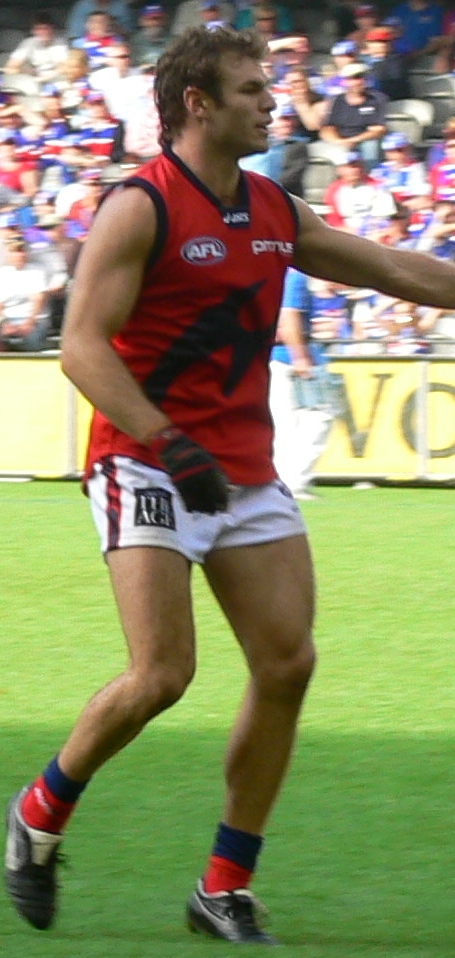

Personal information
- Full name: Simon Godfrey
- Born: 18 October 1980 (age 46)
- Original team: Box Hill
- Height: 184 cm (6 ft 0 in)
- Weight: 86 kg (190 lb)
- Position: Midfielder

Playing career^{1}
Years	Club	Games (Goals)
2000–2007	Melbourne	105 (23)
- ^{1} Playing statistics correct to the end of 2007.

Simon Godfrey (born 18 October 1980) is a former Australian rules footballer who played for the Melbourne Demons in the Australian Football League (AFL).

Godfrey was recruited from Box Hill and debuted for the Demons in 2000, selected at number 14 in the draft. A midfielder, he was fifth in the best and fairest for 2003.

By 2007, Godfrey had established a significant reputation for his performance in defensive tagging roles against prominent opponents. He subsequently reached the milestone of 100 games played.

At the end of the 2007 AFL season, he was not offered a new contract, ending his AFL career after playing 105 games and scoring 23 goals for the club.

In 2008 he joined Eastern Football League Club Norwood, located in Ringwood North. He was a vital part of the midfield for Norwood and was the captain of the side in season 2010.

He then returned to play for Mitcham Football Club, where he had played as a junior years earlier.
