= Trent Bartlett =

Australian rules footballer

Personal information
- Full name: Trent Bartlett
- Born: 26 November 1976 (age 49)
- Original team: Deloraine
- Draft: 45th, 1993 AFL draft
- Height: 189 cm (6 ft 2 in)
- Weight: 95 kg (209 lb)

Playing career^{1}
Years	Club	Games (Goals)
1995–1996	Brisbane Bears	22 (1)
1998–1999	Brisbane Lions	17 (7)
2000–2002	Western Bulldogs	42 (34)
Total		81 (42)
- ^{1} Playing statistics correct to the end of 2002.

Trent Bartlett (born 26 November 1976) is a former Australian rules footballer who played with the Brisbane Bears, Brisbane Lions and Western Bulldogs in the Australian Football League (AFL).

Bartlett captained Tasmania in the Teal Cup and was playing for Deloraine when he was picked up by the Brisbane Bears, with the 45th selection of the 1993 AFL draft. He was used at centre half back at the Bears and spent some time as a key forward when he switched to the Lions in 1998, only after sitting out of football in 1997 with an ankle injury.

He was traded to the Western Bulldogs in 2000, for Michael Martin and played 21 games for the season. As a tall forward, he kicked five goals in a win over Carlton that year.

Bartlett played for Tasmanian Devils Football Club in the Victorian Football League between 2003 and 2006.

In 2016 Bartlett was appointed coach of the Clarence Football Club however resigned from the position in June 2016.
