= Chad Davis (footballer) =

Australian rules footballer

Personal information
- Full name: Chad Davis
- Born: 1 June 1980 (age 46)
- Original team: Oakleigh Chargers (TAC Cup)
- Draft: No. 49, 1999 Rookie Draft

Playing career^{1}
Years	Club	Games (Goals)
2000–2002	St Kilda	31 (17)
- ^{1} Playing statistics correct to the end of 2012.

Chad Davis (born 1 June 1980) is a former Australian rules footballer who played with St Kilda in the Australian Football League (AFL) between 2000 and 2002.

Chad Davis gained notoriety in the 2002 season while playing for St Kilda's Victorian Football League (VFL) affiliate Springvale when he was bitten on the scrotum by Port Melbourne's Peter Filandia. Filandia was subsequently suspended for 10 matches and ordered to undergo counselling before resuming playing.
