= Frank Dimattina =

Australian rules footballer

Personal information
- Born: 3 December 1946 (age 79)
- Original team: De La Salle College
- Debut: 25 July 1964 (Round 14), Richmond vs. South Melbourne, at Punt Road Oval
- Height: 175 cm (5 ft 9 in)
- Weight: 77 kg (170 lb)

Playing career^{1}
| Years | Club | Games (Goals) |
| 1964–1968 | Richmond | 42 (44) |
| 1969–1970 | North Melbourne | 14 (16) |
| 1971-74 | Brunswick | 64 (94) |
| 1975 | Sorrento | 15 ( 80 ) |
| Total | | 135 (154) |
- ^{1} Playing statistics correct to the end of 1970.

Career highlights
- Richmond Most Determined Trophy 1966

Frank Dimattina (born 3 December 1946) is a former Australian rules footballer, who played as a rover for Richmond in the Australian Football League.

== Schoolboy footballer ==
Educated at De La Salle College, he played with Richmond Thirds (Under 19) whilst still at school, and whilst still also playing for his school side (he was the school's First XVIII captain and its best and fairest player in 1964).

He made his senior debut in 1964 at the Punt Road Oval, against South Melbourne, on 25 July.).

He played the next 33 consecutive games for Richmond's First XVIII, winning Richmond's Most Determined Trophy in 1966.

== Richmond ==
Frank, who was very courageous and very skillful, developed into a very valuable member of the Richmond senior side.

In the round 15 match against Collingwood, at the Melbourne Cricket Ground on 6 August 1966, Frank was chasing the ball somewhere between the forward-flank and centre-half forward, bent over, with his head down, concentrating on the ball, and his hands nearly at ground level, when Paddy Guinane, running at full tilt from full-forward, bounced off Mick Erwin, and smashed into Frank's head with one of his massive thighs at full force. It was obvious that, for some inexplicable reason, Guinane had not seen Frank; and because Guinane was having one of his intermittent bad days, it is most likely he was running to get to centre-half forward, and was looking up the ground into the distance.

Guinane nearly killed him; Dimattina was very, very badly concussed, and had a broken nose. He was replaced by the 19th man, Kevin Bartlett; and, from that time (his 24 the senior game), Bartlett was never again selected as a reserve (Prior, 1995, p. 84).

Dimattina played the next match as first rover, but was replaced during the match because of an injured knee, and did not play for the rest of the year. He played six senior games in 1967, and one in 1968; however, he was never able to regain his playing form and, in, particular, he never again displayed the fearless self-confidence and the well-balanced ball skills that had been so characteristic of his play prior to that collision.

Richmond released him at the end of the 1968 season.

== After Richmond ==
Frank went on to play two seasons (1969/1970) with North Melbourne Football Club, and he then spent four seasons with Brunswick Football Club in the Victorian Football Association, playing 64 games and scoring 94 goals.

He was captain-coach of Sorrento Football Club in 1975.

== Record ==
His football record is impressive:

- 1963: Richmond Thirds (Under 19), 4 games (8 goals)
- 1964-1968: Richmond Football Club Reserves, 30 games (45 goals)
- 1964-1968: Richmond Football Club Seniors, 42 games (43 goals), Most Determined Trophy 1966.
- 1969-1970: North Melbourne Football Club Reserves, 23 games (36 goals)
- 1969-1970: North Melbourne Football Club Seniors, 14 games (16 goals)
- 1971-1974: Brunswick Football Club, 64 games (94 goals)
- 1975: Sorrento Football Club, captain-coach

== Post Football ==
Following his football career, Frank was the Richmond Senior Team Manager from 1988 to 1990.

He is the owner of several restaurants, the first being the Il Gambero restaurant in Lygon Street, Carlton.

His son, Paul Dimattina played 131 games for Footscray.
