= Paul Koulouriotis =

Australian rules footballer

Personal information
- Full name: Paul Koulouriotis
- Born: 21 February 1982 (age 44)
- Original team: Calder Cannons
- Height: 184 cm (6 ft 0 in)
- Weight: 88 kg (194 lb)

Playing career^{1}
Years	Club	Games (Goals)
2000	Port Adelaide	3 (0)
2004 – 2006	Geelong	18 (4)
Total		21 (4)
- ^{1} Playing statistics correct to the end of 2006.

Paul Koulouriotis (born 21 February 1982) is a former Australian rules footballer. who played one season for Port Adelaide in 2000, before playing three seasons for Geelong from 2004 to 2006 in the AFL.

Koulouriotis attended St Mary's secondary school, now Simonds Catholic College, in West Melbourne before transferring to St Joseph's College, Melbourne to complete his VCE in 1999.
