= Andrew Ukovic =

Australian rules footballer (born 1978)

Personal information
- Full name: Andrew Ukovic
- Born: 23 November 1978 (age 47) spearwood
- Original teams: West Coburg; Northern Knights
- Draft: 31st, 1995 AFL draft
- Height: 189 cm (6 ft 2 in)
- Weight: 79 kg (174 lb)
- Position: forward

Playing career^{1}
Years	Club	Games (Goals)
1997–1999	Essendon	19 (8)
2000–2001	Collingwood	17 (9)
Total		36 (17)
- ^{1} Playing statistics correct to the end of 2001.

Andrew Ukovic (born 23 November 1978) is a former Australian rules footballer who played with Essendon and Collingwood in the Australian Football League (AFL).

Ukovic was from West Coburg, but drafted from the Northern Knights of the TAC Cup. He played with the Essendon reserves for a year and then broke into the seniors, at the age of 18, in the 1997 AFL season. In round 16, 1999, Ukovic would claim three Brownlow votes for his performance against Essendon's premiership rivals Carlton but two rounds later injured his knee and missed the finals series.

Essendon traded him to Collingwood at the end of the season, in a three club deal from which they gained Jonathon Robran as well as the draft pick which secured ruckman David Hille. By appearing in the 2000 Anzac Day clash, Ukovic became the first footballer to play in the fixture for both Collingwood and Essendon. The following season he played only five games and was delisted.
