= Daniel Foster (Australian footballer) =

Australian rules footballer

Personal information
- Full name: Daniel Foster
- Born: 20 February 1982 (age 44)
- Original team: Port Adelaide Magpies
- Height: 192 cm (6 ft 4 in)
- Weight: 97 kg (214 lb)

Playing career^{1}
Years	Club	Games (Goals)
2000–2002	Geelong	17 (0)
- ^{1} Playing statistics correct to the end of 2002.

Daniel Foster (born 20 February 1982) is a former Australian rules footballer for the Geelong .
