= Barrie Robran =

Australian rules footballer (1947–2025)

Barrie Robran MBE
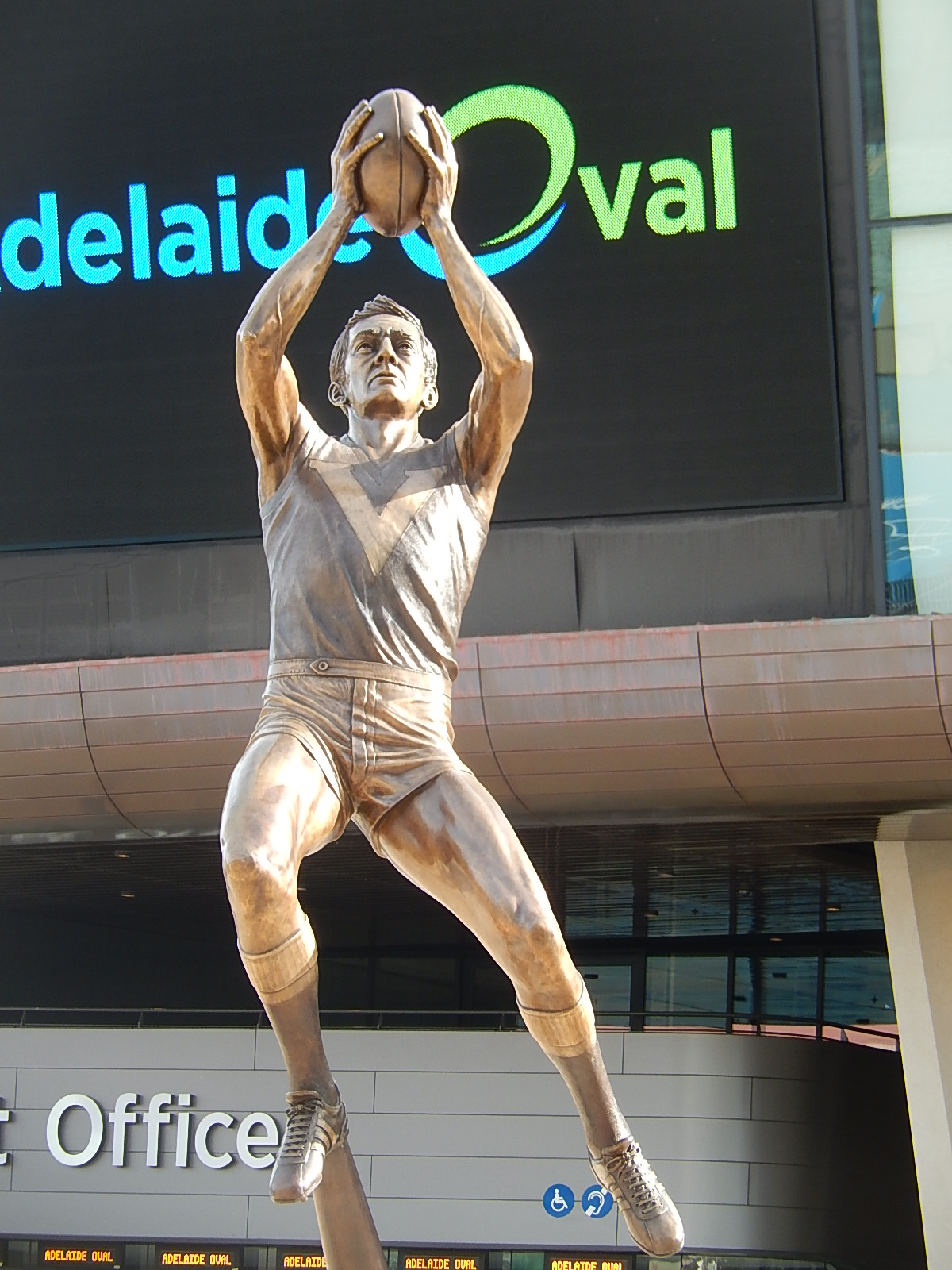
- Statue of Robran outside Adelaide Oval

Personal information
- Full name: Barrie Charles Robran
- Born: 25 September 1947; Whyalla, South Australia, Australia
- Died: 16 July 2025 (aged 77)
- Original team: North Whyalla
- Positions: Centre half-forward, ruck-rover, centre

Playing career
| Years | Club | Games (Goals) |
| 1967–1980 | North Adelaide | 201 (196) |

Representative team honours
| Years | Team | Games (Goals) |
| | South Australia | 17 (?) |

Coaching career
| Years | Club | Games (W–L–D) |
| 1978–80 | North Adelaide | 66 (21–45–0) |

Career highlights
- 3x Magarey Medal: 1968, 1970, 1973; 7x North Adelaide Best and Fairest: 1967–1973; 2x SANFL Premiership: 1971, 1972; Championship of Australia Championship: 1972; South Australia State team Captain: 1974; North Adelaide club Captain: 1974–1977; Australian Football Hall of Fame: Inductee 1996, Legend Status 2001; North Adelaide Team of the Century: (Ruck Rover); South Australian Football Hall of Fame; North Adelaide Hall of Fame - (Icon Status); South Australia State selector: 1984–1998

Barrie Charles Robran MBE (25 September 1947 – 16 July 2025) was an Australian rules footballer who played for North Adelaide in the South Australian National Football League (SANFL) from 1967 to 1980. He won South Australian football's highest individual honour, the Magarey Medal, on three occasions – 1968, 1970 and 1973.

Robran is generally considered to be the greatest ever South Australian football player. His citation in the Australian Football Hall of Fame describes him as "the best player never to play at AFL level".

Robran won immense respect not only for his talent, but also his humility and sportsmanship. He played most of his time at centre half-forward, but was versatile enough to also play in the centre or on the ball as a ruck-rover. Off the field, Robran kept a low public profile and shunned much publicity.

== Early life and career ==
Robran was the firstborn son of father Colin and mother Glad. He had a younger brother, Rodney. He was educated at Whyalla Technical High School and was School Prefect in his final year, 1964. A natural athlete, Robran excelled not only at football, but also played cricket, basketball and table tennis. He also participated in cross-country running and baseball.

Robran joined North Adelaide so that he could play alongside his hero Don Lindner. He moved from Whyalla in 1966 to play juniors, and he began his League career in 1967. In his debut season he was co-winner of North's best and fairest with Don Lindner, came third in the Magarey Medal, and played in the South Australian state team.

Robran went on to win the Magarey medal in 1968, 1970 and 1973, and won the North Adelaide best and fairest every year from 1968 to 1973. He was instrumental in North Adelaide's premiership sides in 1971 and 1972, as well as their Australian Championship win over VFL premier, Carlton in 1972. Making the move to the VFL never interested him; a quiet country boy, he never aspired to a life in Melbourne.

A knee injury in 1974 severely curtailed his career, although he struggled on through injury until retiring in 1980. It is a measure of his innate skill that even in his final season, playing with restriction, he polled four Magarey Medal votes in the three games he played. He played 201 games for the Roosters and made 17 State appearances. Robran was coach of North Adelaide for three years, but enjoyed little success.

After retiring from North Adelaide, Barrie played for the Walkerville Football Club in 1983 but missed the Grand Final after suffering an ankle injury during the final series. Barrie become a junior coach at the club, coaching both his sons through the junior grades. Barrie still attended Walkerville Football Club games from time to time.

== After playing ==
Robran was among the first footballers to be inducted into the Australian Football Hall of Fame in 1996. In 2001, he was upgraded to legend status. He was the first South Australian player, and the first player never to have played in the VFL/AFL, to be named a legend.

In 2000, Barrie Robran was named as a ruck rover in North Adelaide's "Team of the Century" (1901–2000). He was also part of the teams selection committee alongside then Roosters Chairman Colin Walsh, Tom McKenzie, Gordon Schwartz, Jeff Pash and Don Lindner. Both Pash and Lindner were also selected in the team.

In 2002, Robran was one of the 113 inaugural inductees into the South Australian Football Hall of Fame.

In the 1982 New Year Honours, he was appointed a Member of the Order of the British Empire (MBE) for service to Australian rules football.

Robran is depicted taking a high mark in Jamie Cooper's painting the Game That Made Australia, commissioned by the AFL in 2008 to celebrate the 150th anniversary of the sport.

In 2012 he was elevated to the status of legend in the SA Sports Hall of Fame, joining Sir Donald Bradman and Bart Cummings as the only three legends in the Hall of Fame.

In 2014 he was the first SA footballer accorded the honour of having a statue at the revamped Adelaide Oval.

== Personal life and death ==
Robran married Taimi Vestel at the Enfield Methodist Church in January 1970. He had two sons who also played football: Matthew (born 1971) played in Adelaide's 1997 and 1998 premiership victories, while Jonathon (born 1972) represented Hawthorn and Essendon. His younger brother Rodney Robran played alongside him for much of his playing career at North Adelaide and was a well-regarded player in his own right.

Robran also had a very brief cricket career, in the 1971–72 season playing one List A and two first-class games for South Australia.

Robran died on 16 July 2025, at the age of 77.
