= Sean Charles =

Australian rules footballer

Personal information
- Born: 18 May 1975 (age 51)
- Original team: Powelltown (YRFL)
- Height: 175 cm (5 ft 9 in)
- Weight: 79 kg (174 lb)

Playing career^{1}
Years	Club	Games (Goals)
1992–1997	Melbourne	47 (60)
1998	Carlton	1 (0)
2000–2001	St Kilda	8 (6)
Total		56 (66)
- ^{1} Playing statistics correct to the end of 2000.

Sean Charles (born 18 May 1975) is a former Australian rules footballer who played with Melbourne, Carlton and St Kilda in the Australian Football League (AFL).

Recruited from Yarra Ranges Football League (YRFL) club Powelltown, Charles was promoted from the reserves after showing average form, making his senior AFL debut five days after his seventeenth birthday in 1992. His playing career had several interruptions, due to injury and a desire to spend more time at home. Throughout his career he suffered from a recurring scaphoid problem, and in his first and only game for Carlton he broke his leg.

Charles was away from the game until 2000 when he was a surprise pre-season draft selection for St Kilda. He stayed with the club until 2001 when a lack of enthusiasm pushed him into retirement.
