= Matthew Robran =

Australian rules footballer

Personal information
- Full name: Matthew Robran
- Born: 19 March 1971 (age 55)
- Original team: Norwood (SANFL)
- Height: 194 cm (6 ft 4 in)
- Weight: 98 kg (216 lb)

Playing career^{1}
Years	Club	Games (Goals)
1991	Hawthorn	7 (5)
1993–2001	Adelaide	130 (110)
Total		137 (115)

Representative team honours
Years	Team	Games (Goals)
- South Australia
- ^{1} Playing statistics correct to the end of 2001.

Career highlights
- Club: 2× AFL premiership player (1997, 1998); Adelaide Team of the Decade — centre half-forward; Representative: National Football Carnival Championship: 1993

Matthew Robran (born 19 March 1971) is a former Australian rules footballer who represented Hawthorn and Adelaide in the Australian Football League (AFL).

Robran was the first son of South Australian football legend Barrie Robran, and as a result he and his younger brother Jonathon, who also played AFL football, often faced unfair comparison with their father.

== Statistics ==
Legend
G	Goals	K	Kicks	D	Disposals	T	Tackles
B	Behinds	H	Handballs	M	Marks	H/O	Hit-outs

Season	Team	No.	Games	Totals								Averages (per game)							
Season	Team	No.	Games	G	B	K	H	D	M	T	H/O	G	B	K	H	D	M	T	H/O
1991	Hawthorn	25	7	5	7	55	44	99	29	6	9	0.7	1.0	7.9	6.3	14.1	4.1	0.9	1.3
1993	Adelaide	5	9	7	4	66	62	128	42	9	32	0.8	0.4	7.3	6.9	14.2	4.7	1.0	3.6
1994	Adelaide	5	0	—	—	—	—	—	—	—	—	—	—	—	—	—	—	—	—
1995	Adelaide	5	11	3	3	50	62	112	36	11	43	0.3	0.3	4.5	5.6	10.2	3.3	1.0	3.9
1996	Adelaide	5	21	22	7	135	137	272	104	37	67	1.0	0.3	6.4	6.5	13.0	5.0	1.8	3.2
1997	Adelaide	10	19	24	14	150	89	239	95	35	28	1.3	0.7	7.9	4.7	12.6	5.0	1.8	1.5
1998	Adelaide	10	18	22	17	117	97	214	65	21	62	1.2	0.9	6.5	5.4	11.9	3.6	1.2	3.4
1999	Adelaide	10	16	14	11	119	62	181	58	14	103	0.9	0.7	7.4	3.9	11.3	3.6	0.9	6.4
2000	Adelaide	10	21	9	12	204	122	326	128	37	81	0.4	0.6	9.7	5.8	15.5	6.1	1.8	3.9
2001	Adelaide	10	15	9	5	103	41	144	50	9	26	0.6	0.3	6.9	2.7	9.6	3.3	0.6	1.7
Career			137	115	80	999	716	1715	607	179	451	0.8	0.6	7.3	5.2	12.5	4.4	1.3	3.3
