= Fred Campbell (Australian footballer) =

Australian rules footballer

Personal information
- Born: 14 December 1979 (age 46)
- Original teams: Pioneer FC (CAFL, Northern Territory)
- Height: 175 cm (5 ft 9 in)
- Weight: 75 kg (165 lb)

Playing career^{1}
Years	Club	Games (Goals)
1999	Sydney	5 (3)
2000	St Kilda	7 (4)
Total		12 (7)
- ^{1} Playing statistics correct to the end of 2000.

Fred Campbell (born 14 December 1979) is a former Australian rules footballer who played with Sydney and St Kilda in the AFL in 1999 and 2000.

Originally from the Pioneer Football Club in Alice Springs, Campbell was drafted by the Swans with the 40th selection in the 1997 AFL draft, three selections before the Swans selected future dual Brownlow Medalist, dual premiership player, four-time All-Australian, member of the Indigenous Team of the Century and 350 game player Adam Goodes.

After five games for Sydney in 1999 he left the club to return home to Alice Springs. He was, however, drafted by St Kilda in the 2000 Pre-season draft, where he played a further seven games in 2000, before again returning to Alice Springs.
