= Ty Zantuck =

Australian rules footballer, born 1982

Personal information
- Born: 15 February 1982 (age 44)
- Original team: St. Bernards/Western Jets (TAC Cup)
- Debut: Round 20, 23 July 2000, Richmond vs. St Kilda, at Melbourne Cricket Ground
- Height: 188 cm (6 ft 2 in)
- Weight: 93 kg (205 lb)
- Position: Defender

Playing career^{1}
Years	Club	Games (Goals)
2000–2004	Richmond	68 (20)
2005	Essendon	9 (0)
Total		77 (20)
- ^{1} Playing statistics correct to the end of 2005.

Career highlights
- AFL Rising Star nominee 2002

Ty Zantuck (born 15 February 1982) is a former Australian rules footballer.

He is the son of AFL footballer Shane Zantuck and the nephew of AFL brothers Arnold Briedis and Robert Briedis.

He began his career at the Richmond Football Club after being drafted in 2000.

In 2002, he finished ninth in the Richmond's best & fairest. In round 21 of the 2003 season Zantuck kicked five goals.

In round 18 of the 2004 season against Collingwood he booted four goals.

Zantuck was delisted at the end of 2005.

Following his AFL career, Zantuck played local football for Kangaroo Flat in 2007, before joining Heidelberg Football Club in Victoria's Northern Football League where he played in their 2008 premiership side. Zantuck then moved to former junior club Strathmore for the 2010 season.

Ty Zantuck was diagnosed with suspected chronic traumatic encephalopathy in late 2021. He sued Richmond Football Club and two of its doctors for breaching their duty of care to him in the Supreme Court of Victoria in 2023 for back injuries and the brain injury, sustained between 2000 and 2004.
