= Andrew Schauble =

Australian rules footballer, born 1976

Personal information
- Born: 17 November 1976 (age 49)
- Original team: Xavier College
- Debut: Round 18, 1995, Collingwood vs. Geelong, at MGC

Playing career^{1}
Years	Club	Games (Goals)
1994–1999	Collingwood	79 (11)
2000–2005	Sydney Swans	88 (23)
Total		167 (34)
- ^{1} Playing statistics correct to the end of 2005.

Career highlights
- Bob Skilton Medal: 2000; AFL Rising Star nominee: 1996

Andrew Schauble (born 17 November 1976) is a former Australian rules football player.

For over a decade, he was a consistent player in defence for both the Collingwood Football Club and the Sydney Swans. After being struck down by injury in 2004 and struggling to recapture his solid form, he was restricted to only 4 games in 2005 and struggled to break into the young Sydney lineup. In the wake of the Swans' 43-point loss to St Kilda which attracted criticism from AFL CEO Andrew Demetriou and various commentators, Schauble was recalled for what would turn out to be his final game, against Carlton at Marvel Stadium. Following Sydney's premiership win in 2005 (which he was not a member of) Schauble retired from professional football at 28 years of age. He travelled overseas and spent 10 years as a Management consultant in Dubai and around the Middle East, particularly focusing on work around Leadership and Talent. He then returned to Australia having started BAT Logic, a Rowing equipment and consulting business which has seen significant success at Elite and Olympic level.
