= Brett Moyle =

Australian rules footballer

Personal information
- Full name: Brett Moyle
- Born: 31 March 1980 (age 46)
- Original team: Oakleigh Chargers
- Height: 180 cm (5 ft 11 in)
- Weight: 78 kg (172 lb)

Playing career^{1}
| Years | Club | Games (Goals) |
| 2000–2004 | St Kilda | 48 (11) |
- ^{1} Playing statistics correct to the end of 2004.

Brett Moyle (born 31 March 1980) is a former Australian rules footballer who played with St Kilda in the Australian Football League (AFL).

Moyle, a left footed wingman, played his early football at Haileybury College and the Oakleigh Chargers in the TAC Cup. He came to St Kilda through the rookie draft and was nominated for the 2000 AFL Rising Star when he had 26 kicks against the Sydney Swans in round 16. The following year he suffered a broken leg mid-season but came back eight rounds later to finish with 15 games for the season, from which he averaged a career high 17 disposals. Complications from a corked thigh meant he missed the first nine weeks of the 2002 AFL season but he missed only one more game for the rest of the year.

After leaving St Kilda, Moyle finished his playing career with the Balwyn Football Club, where he was from 2005 to 2009, during which time he also served as an assistant coach. He was a member of their 2005 and 2008 premiership teams, the latter as captain.

Moyle was appointed senior coach of North Ringwood Football Club for the 2010 Eastern Football League season. He coached and played in North Ringwood's 2012 division 3 premiership and coached North Ringwood to the 2014 division 2 premiership. He left North Ringwood after the 2015 season.
