= Clinton King =

Australian rules footballer (born 1978)

Personal information
- Full name: Clinton King
- Born: 24 March 1978 (age 48)
- Original team: Eastern Ranges
- Height: 179 cm (5 ft 10 in)
- Weight: 76 kg (168 lb)

Playing career^{1}
Years	Club	Games (Goals)
1996–97	Sydney	9 (4)
1998–99	Collingwood	22 (9)
2000–03	Richmond	58 (10)
Total		89 (23)
- ^{1} Playing statistics correct to the end of 2003.

Career highlights
- Harry Collier Trophy 1998

Clinton King (born 24 March 1978) is an Australian rules footballer who played for Sydney, Collingwood and Richmond in the Australian Football League (AFL).

Recruited from Eastern Ranges, King played five AFL games in 1996, the year Sydney made a drought breaking Grand Final appearance. He was traded to Collingwood in 1998 and the following season missed a lot of football after suffering a foot stress fracture.

Collingwood off-loaded King after the 1999 season, so they could get a ruckman in Steven McKee to their club. He broke a leg in his first year at Richmond but re-established his place in the team during the 2001 season and was a member of their finals campaign. King appeared in the Preliminary Final loss to Brisbane and performed admirably with 21 disposals.

King headed to South Australian National Football League (SANFL) club South Adelaide in 2004 and won the club's best and fairest award, the Knuckey Cup. In 2005, he struggled with regularly being tagged and left the club and headed home to Melbourne at the end of the season. He is currently an assistant coach for Keysborough in the Mornington Peninsula Football League.

His father, Derek, was a league footballer at St Kilda, and Liston Trophy winner in the Victorian Football Association.
