= Acacia cochlocarpa =

Scientific classification
- Kingdom: Plantae
- Clade: Tracheophytes
- Clade: Angiosperms
- Clade: Eudicots
- Clade: Rosids
- Order: Fabales
- Family: Fabaceae
- Subfamily: Caesalpinioideae
- Clade: Mimosoid clade
- Genus: Acacia
- Species: A. cochlocarpa

Binomial name
- Acacia cochlocarpa Meisn.
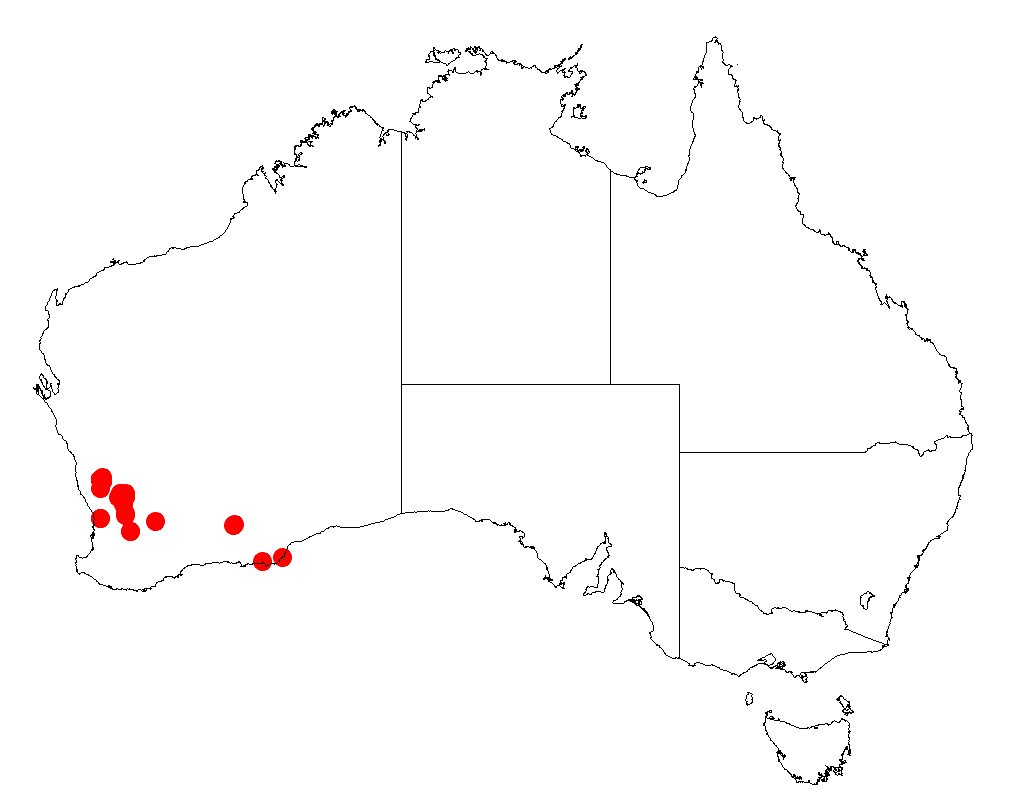
- Occurrence data from AVH

Synonyms
- Acacia cochliocarpa Benth. orth. var.; Racosperma cochlocarpum (Meisn.) Pedley

Species of legume

Acacia cochlocarpa is a species of flowering plant in the family Fabaceae and is endemic to the south-west of Western Australia. It is a sprawling shrub with slightly bending branchlets, narrowly oblong, strongly curved phyllodes, more or less spherical to shortly cylindrical heads of golden yellow flowers, and tightly spiral or irregularly coiled pods.

== Description ==
Acacia cochlocarpa is sprawling shrub that typically grows to a height of up to 30–70 cm (12–28 in) sometimes to a height of 1.5 m (4 ft 11 in) and has slightly bending branchlets. Its phyllodes are erect, narrowly oblong, slightly to strongly curved, 25–75 mm (0.98–2.95 in) long and 3–6 mm (0.12–0.24 in) wide with 3 to 7 prominent veins. There are sometimes stipules at the base of the phyllodes. The flowers are arranged in two, more or less spherical or shortly cylindrical, sessile heads 5–10 mm (0.20–0.39 in) long and 5–6 mm (0.20–0.24 in) in diameter in axils. Flowering time depends on subspecies, and the pods are tightly spiralled to more or less irregularly coiled, containing round to oblong seeds 1.5–2.5 mm (0.059–0.098 in) long with a yellowish aril on the end.

== Taxonomy ==
Acacia cochlocarpa was first formally described in 1855 by Carl Meissner from specimens collected by James Drummond and the description was published in Botanische Zeitung. The specific epithet (cochlocarpa) means 'a spirally twisted fruit'.

In 1999, Bruce Maslin and Alex R. Chapman. described 2 subspecies of A. cochlocarpa and the names are accepted by the Australian Plant Census:

- Acacia cochlocarpa Meisn. subsp. cochlocarpa, commonly known as spiral-fruited wattle, has phyllodes 40–75 mm (1.6–3.0 in) long and 4–6 mm (0.16–0.24 in) wide with stipules that fall off early, flowering between June and August, followed by glabrous pods.
- Acacia cochlocarpa subsp. velutinosa, Maslin & A.R.Chapm. commonly known as velvety spiral pod wattle, has phyllodes 25–40 mm (0.98–1.57 in) long and 3–5 mm (0.12–0.20 in) wide with persistent stipules 1.5–2 mm (0.059–0.079 in) long, flowering between May and July, followed by velvety pods.

Acacia cochlocarpa is similar in appearance and closely related to Acacia lirellata and is also closely related to Acacia tetraneura.

== Distribution and habitat ==
Acacia cochlocarpa has a scattered distribution around Watheroo and Manmanning in the Avon Wheatbelt and Geraldton Sandplains bioregions of Western Australia where it grows in sand, clay, gravel and laterite in heath.

Subspecies cochlocarpa is restricted to near Watheroo, with an early collection west of Moora, and subsp. velutinosa is restricted to near Manmanning, with an early collection near York.

== Conservation status ==
Both subspecies of A. cochlocarpa are listed as "Threatened Flora (Declared Rare Flora — Extant)" by the Government of Western Australia Department of Biodiversity, Conservation and Attractions.

== See also ==
- List of Acacia species
