= Marty McGrath =

Martin McGrath

Personal information
- Born: 23 February 1984 (age 42)
- Original team: South Fremantle
- Debut: Round 17, 26 July 2003, Richmond vs. Western Bulldogs, at Docklands
- Height: 180 cm (5 ft 11 in)
- Weight: 78 kg (172 lb)

Playing career^{1}
Years	Club	Games (Goals)
2003	Richmond	4 (6)
- ^{1} Playing statistics correct to the end of 2003.

Martin Leslie McGrath (born 23 February 1984) is an indigenous former Australian rules football player who played in the AFL in 2003 for the Richmond Football Club. He is the cousin of footballers Ashley, Toby and Cory McGrath.

He kicked five goals in his debut match in 2003, but only kicked one more in his career before he was delisted at the end of the season. He remained in Victoria and has played for Templestowe in the Eastern Football League and Lalor in the Diamond Valley Football League.

In July 2020, McGrath was charged with causing bodily harm after allegedly throwing a brick at a teenager riding a motorcycle. He escaped from custody after facing Perth Magistrates Court in August, but turned himself in to police the next day.
