= Dion Woods =

Australian rules footballer

Personal information
- Full name: Dion Woods
- Born: 25 January 1982 (age 44)
- Original team: Perth
- Draft: 51st overall, 2000 AFL draft
- Height: 191 cm (6 ft 3 in)
- Weight: 84 kg (185 lb)
- Position: Defender

Playing career^{1}
Years	Club	Games (Goals)
2001–2005	Fremantle	59 (7)
- ^{1} Playing statistics correct to the end of 2005.

Dion Woods (born 25 January 1982) is a former professional Australian rules footballer who played for Fremantle in the Australian Football League (AFL) between 2001 and 2005.

Woods was drafted from Perth in the West Australian Football League (WAFL) as the 51st selection in the 2000 AFL draft and played mainly as a defender.

Tall and athletic, Woods showed much promise in his first year, winning the Fremantle's Beacon Award in 2001 for the best young player and also being nominated for the AFL Rising Star award. His career peaked in 2003 playing in 21 matches, including Fremantle's first ever finals match, as a key member of the "no-name defence".

However he struggled to maintain his form and spent most of the 2005 season playing for Perth before being delisted at the end of that season. He played one more session in the WAFL for Perth before retiring. He then played country football, including for Wongan-Ballidu and Boulder.

Woods is a cousin of the McGrath family (Ashley, Cory and Toby), all of whom are former AFL players.
