= Muresk =

Muresk may refer to:

- Muresk, Western Australia, a town in Shire of Northam
- Muresk Institute, formerly Muresk Agricultural College
