= Toby McGrath =

Australian rules footballer, born 1980

Personal information
- Full name: Toby Jason McGrath
- Born: 11 October 1980 (age 46); Northam, Western Australia
- Original team: Kent Districts
- Draft: No. 12, 2000 Rookie Draft, West Coast; No. 57, 2002 Rookie Draft, Essendon
- Height: 180 cm (5 ft 11 in)
- Weight: 87 kg (192 lb)
- Positions: Midfield, half-back flanker

Club information
- Current club: South Fremantle
- Number: 39

Playing career^{1}
Years	Club	Games (Goals)
1998–2001; 2004–12	South Fremantle	234 (107)
2000–01	West Coast	0 (0)
2002	Essendon (VFL)	12 (0)
2003	Bendigo Bombers	15 (?)
Total		261 (107+)

Representative team honours
Years	Team	Games (Goals)
2000; 2004–05; 2008–10	WAFL	6 (1)
- ^{1} Playing statistics correct to the end of Round 22, 2011.

Career highlights
- WAFL representative team 2000, 2004, 2005, 2008, 2009, 2010; South Fremantle best and fairest 2004, 2008; Sandover Medal 2005; South Fremantle premiership side 2005, 2009; Simpson Medal 2005 (Grand Final); WAFL representative team captain 2008, 2009

Toby Jason McGrath (born 11 October 1980) is an Australian rules footballer who played for South Fremantle in the West Australian Football League (WAFL). He was rookie-listed with both the West Coast Eagles and Essendon in the Australian Football League (AFL), but did not play a game for either club.

== Early career ==
McGrath was born in Northam, Western Australia. He has three brothers: Bradley, Cory and Ashley McGrath. Cory and Ashley both played in the AFL, for Carlton and the Brisbane Lions respectively. McGrath played junior football in Katanning before being recruited to South Fremantle in the WAFL, where he made his debut 1998.

== AFL career ==
McGrath had a brief taste of the professional Australian Football League, when he was recruited from South Fremantle to the West Coast Eagles’ rookie list. He was delisted after spending a year on their list without playing a game. He was then given another chance by the Essendon Football Club in 2002 & 2003, where he played with his brother Cory, although again did not manage to make his senior debut.

== Later WAFL career ==
He won the South Fremantle Football Club's Best & Fairest Award in 2004 and in 2005 he won both the Sandover, the WAFL’s prestigious best player award and Simpson Medal for the Best player in the Grand Final and was a member of South Fremantle’s premiership winning side. He represented WA on six occasions in 2000, 2004 and 2005, and was captain of the 2008 WA side that defeated Queensland in Townsville, 2009 and 2010.

In 2008 he was appointed captain of South Fremantle and played his 150th game for the Bulldogs while also winning his second Best & Fairest award. In 2009, he played in his fifth WAFL Grand Final and captained South Fremantle to the WAFL premiership, his second after being a member of the 2005 team. He played his 200th game for South Fremantle in the final round of the 2010 season. In 2011 Toby McGrath was named in South Fremantle’s Indigenous Team of The Century and he in 2012 was included in the WAFL’s Best 25 players of the Last 25 Years. He was inducted into the South Fremantle Hall of Fame in 2022 and is recognised as one of the WAFLs most decorated players.

McGrath is employed as a firefighter with the Fire and Emergency Services Authority of Western Australia. He has three brothers, Cory and Ashley who have both played in the AFL and Bradley. West Coast Eagles premiership player Mark Lecras, Marty McGrath and Dion Woods, who played for Richmond and Fremantle respectively, are all cousins.
