= Acacia lirellata =

Scientific classification
- Kingdom: Plantae
- Clade: Tracheophytes
- Clade: Angiosperms
- Clade: Eudicots
- Clade: Rosids
- Order: Fabales
- Family: Fabaceae
- Subfamily: Caesalpinioideae
- Clade: Mimosoid clade
- Genus: Acacia
- Species: A. lirellata

Binomial name
- Acacia lirellata Maslin & A.R.Chapman
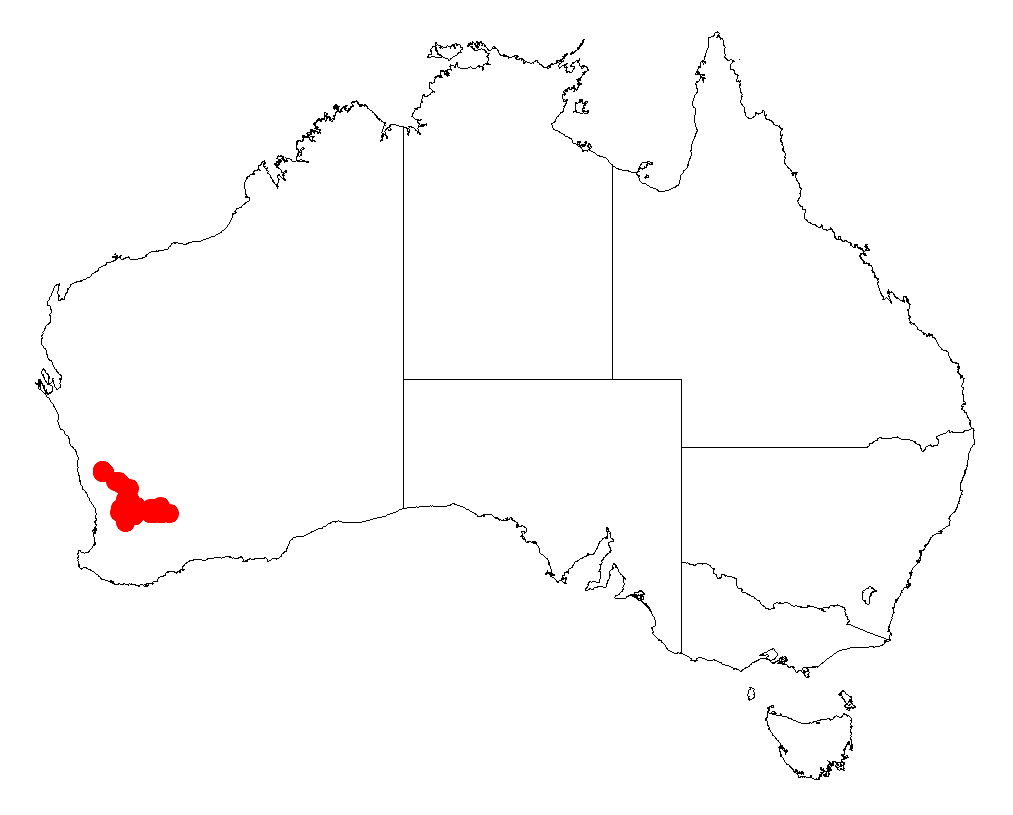
- Occurrence data from AVH

Synonyms
- Racosperma lirellatum (Maslin & A.R.Chapm.) Pedley

Species of legume

Acacia lirellata is a species of flowering plant in the family Fabaceae and is endemic to the south-west of Western Australia. It is a bushy, low-lying to erect shrub, with erect, terete or flat and narrowly linear phyllodes, spherical to oblong, sessile heads of golden yellow flowers, and straight or loosely coiled, crusty or thinly leathery pods appearing like a string of beads.

== Description ==
Acacia lirellata is a bushy, low-lying to erect shrub that typically grows up to 3 m (9.8 ft) high and 4 m (13 ft) wide and has ribbed, straight or zig-zagged branchlets. Its phyllodes are erect, terete or flat and narrowly linear, curved or ring-shaped, 30–130 mm (1.2–5.1 in) long and 0.8–2 mm (0.031–0.079 in) wide, thick and glabrous with three veins on each face when flattened. The flowers are golden yellow and borne in two sessile, more or less spherical to oblong heads 5–7 mm (0.20–0.28 in) long and 4–6 mm (0.16–0.24 in) wide in axils. Flowering occurs from June to August, and the pods appear like a string of beads, straight or loosely coiled and flat, up to 70 mm (2.8 in) long, 2–3 mm (0.079–0.118 in) wide and crusty to thinly leathery. The seeds are oblong to elliptic, 2.5–3 mm (0.098–0.118 in) long, glossy dark brown with a yellowish aril on the end.

== Taxonomy ==
Acacia lirellata was first formally described in 1999 by Bruce Maslin and Alex Chapman in the journal Nuytsia from specimens Maslin collected 2 km (1.2 mi) east of Quairading in 1976.

In the same journal, Maslin and Chapman described two subspecies of A lirellata, and the names are accepted by the Australian Plant Census:

- Acacia lirellata Maslin & A.R.Chapman subsp. compressa has flat phyllodes 1.5–2 mm (0.059–0.079 in) wide with a short pulvinus.
- Acacia lirellata Maslin & A.R.Chapman subsp. lirellata has sessile phyllodes that are terete to four sided in cross section, the phyllode bases extending down the stem and 0.8–1.5 mm (0.031–0.059 in) wide.

== Distribution and habitat ==
This species of wattle occurs in scattered places between Coorow, Ballidu, Bruce Rock and Waterbidden Rock (about 80 km (50 mi) east of Bruce Rock) in the Avon Wheatbelt and Geraldton Sandplains bioregions of south-western Western Australia.

Subspecies compressa occurs between about Ballidu and about 180 km (110 mi) south-east from Bruce Rock to Waterbidden Rock and subsp. liratella has a discontinuous distribution from the Coorow-Watheroo area and about 180 km (110 mi) south-east to the Northham-Quairading area.

== Conservation status ==
Subspecies compressa is listed as 'Priority Two' and subsp. liratella as 'Priority Three' under the Biodiversity Conservation Act.

== See also ==
- List of Acacia species
