= Northam Post Office =

Historic commonwealth heritage site in Northam, Western Australia

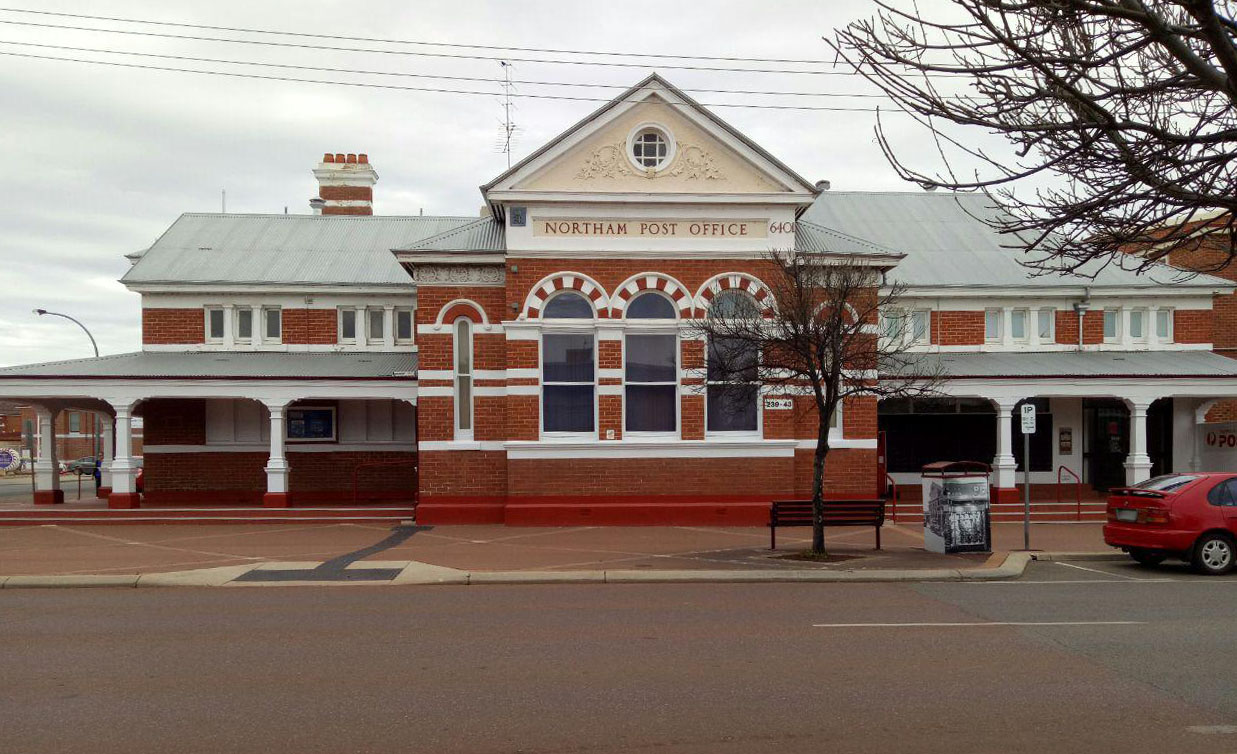

- Location within Western Australia
- Interactive map of Northam Post Office
- 31.6551°S 116.6703°E
- Location: 239–243 Fitzgerald Street, Northam, Western Australia, Australia

Commonwealth Heritage List
- Official name: Northam Post Office
- Type: Listed place (Historic)
- Designated: 22 June 2004
- Reference no.: 105528

Western Australia Heritage Register
- Official name: Northam Post Office & Quarters
- Type: State Registered Place
- Designated: 2 September 1997
- Reference no.: 1867

Northam Post Office is a heritage-listed post office at 239–243 Fitzgerald Street, Northam, Western Australia, Australia. It was added to the Australian Commonwealth Heritage List on 22 June 2004.

== History ==
Postal services were initially provided to Northam residents from the 1840s, when J. T. Cooke opened the first post office in the region. From 1861, the postmaster, George Throssell, conducted postal services from his business premises, until local residents began to lobby for a separate post and telegraph office. The first Northam Post Office was constructed in 1873 in Wellington Street and Hawes Street, but storm damage during the early 1890s resulted in repairs and additions. After significant population increases and development following the 1890s gold rush, the post office building was deemed to be inadequate and the community lobbied for a more centrally located, larger post office. In 1892–93 the building was enlarged to a design by George Temple-Poole, but finally replaced by a larger post office in response to successful local petitioning (1905–09).

In February 1905, the federal Postmaster-General's Department made a recommendation that the Northam Post Office be moved to a more convenient location and by July a site had been purchased for £450, equivalent to A$75,904 in 2022, from J. Sermon. Initially, State Government architect Hillson Beasley prepared sketch plans, but works were held up pending alterations requested by the Commonwealth Public Works. By 1908, the State Public Works Department (PWD), Commonwealth Works Officers and Post Department had not agreed on the sketch plans, leading the Post-Master General's Department (PMG) to submit new plans to the PWD. The two architects most heavily involved in post office work at that time were John Smith Murdoch and Horace Mackennal, who are believed, through the PMG, to have prepared a new set of plans and sent them back to the State Architect for full documentation, although this has not been confirmed.

The contractors, Messrs Pittman and Totterdill on 10 December 1908, completed construction of the new post office and the building was opened for business on 1 February 1909. Coincidental with the new building was the introduction of the underground system of telephone wires. It incorporated the clock from the former 1873 post office on a projecting gable to the main street.

Telegraph operations were relocated to the new telephone exchange building constructed on the south side of post office around 1923. Rear yard alterations to serve motor delivery of mail were implemented in 1936. In 1957, the 1873 post office clock, which was by then unserviceable, was removed.

Major refurbishments in 1961–62 included the addition of new toilets and staff areas, and extensive maintenance. Some site alterations at the rear to provide for vehicle access to the Longline communications facility nearby occurred around the same time. A laundry and garage was added to the rear of current building c. 1966–68.

The quarters were refurbished c. 1985 and in 1994 the post office underwent an internal refurbishment of the postal hall area to standard Australia Post retail design.

== Description ==
Northam Post Office is located at 239–243 Fitzgerald Street, corner Gordon Street, Northam.

Northam Post Office is a large one and two storey redbrick building with a residence located at the rear. It is located on a northeast corner site formed by Gordon and Fitzgerald Street, the latter being the main approach road to the township. Nearby is the town hall and library buildings, both of which are notable buildings.

Behind the post office, the rear of the site has an established lawn garden with fruit trees and a brick paved courtyard. Surrounding this is a number of outbuildings which include a metal clad carport, a brickwork laundry (formerly a bicycle shed) and toilet and secured by a metal fence. Two red colorbond sheds, one large, are located along the south rear boundary with vehicular access provided by a side laneway and asphalted apron.

The post office and residence component is figured in characteristic Federation-period massing for a corner site. Two projecting double-height wings, toward Gordon Street and Fitzgerald Streets respectively, form an L-shaped armature around a more animated massing for the main corner postal hall and verandah. The two bracketing wings are however, not identical (nor are they generally in the Federation period). The Fitzgerald Street postal wing, evoking a portico, is gabled with a grouping of five round-arched windows. The Gordon Street residential wing, in contrast, has a hipped roof and single window facing northeast, and a hooded triple casement below, embodying domesticity on well-established free-style terms associated with the work of Norman Shaw in England.

The building's high redbrick walls are striated by white stucco banding set in high contrast, an aspect which is further emphasised by the use of grouped clerestory and double height windows, voissoir brick and render work and the decorative panel frieze which wraps the postal hall under the eaveline. A pedimented roof augments the corner postal hall over the entry and, not unlike the corner tower of a Federation house, reasserts a diagonal line of force against the right-angled intersection of the main wings. It has an enveloping verandah, which further separates the institutional and domestic wings of the building at the corner. The weighted trabeated enclosure is framed by thickened columns and linked by a heavily-proportioned plank-frieze which is turned down at the corners to form quadrants over each support. The quarters, entered further along Gordon Street, figure more as a Federation style house, dominated by a lightly scaled timber verandah.

In plan form, the post office has three main sections which relate to the original design for a combined post office and residence. Externally, arcades flank both sides of the projecting wing to Fitzgerald Street. The northwest corner arcade provides ramped access to the retail shop and that on the south has been altered by the installation of a metal framed and glazed post office box lobby with a dropped plasterboard ceiling. The main interior is accessed through automatic sliding double doors to the projecting entry vestibule and the original double doors on the south side are secured. The postal hall's original double-height volume has been subdivided by a 3/4 high partition wall and counter. This provides a separate staff area at the rear which incorporates the strong room, staff work spaces and access to the lunch room. Similarly, a full height partition along the south divides the back of house to the mail sorting area which itself has a corner partitioned return which houses the post office box lobby. Rear service areas include a plant room, store and general area. Located outside the extent of the original building line a steel-framed gantry with a concrete floor has been constructed which is flanked by brickwork toilets and a store.

A door located in the corner of the former postal hall provides internal access to the residence. This leads directly to the main stair to the first floor, and the Gordon Street side entry adjacent. In linear configuration, the ground floor rooms include a lounge, dining, kitchen and pantry. Four bedrooms are located at the upper level in pinwheel configuration. A refurbished bathroom is located adjacent to the stair on the west side, and a small toilet and screened enclosure has subsequently been built at the south end of the upper balcony.

=== Condition and integrity ===
Externally and internally, Northam Post Office's intactness and integrity are comparatively high with regard to the original conception, material and detail. The following observations are made in reference to historic photographs of the place.

Elements of the original exterior presentation of the building which appear to be missing or altered include:

- painted verandah frame (originally dark in tone)
- painted gable circular window mullions (originally dark);
- painted clerestory pilasters windows (previously unpainted?);
- addition of Gordon Street ground floor hood awning;
- light and dark striped metal sheet to corner verandah (replaced in monochrome);
- verandah screen to south end of Fitzgerald Street;
- missing finial to decorative roof lantern;
- missing clock and altered lettering to Fitzgerald Street gable (formerly "POST OFFICE" not 'NORTHAM POST OFFICE);
- verandah post office box enclosure (south end);
- brick infill to openings within corner entry verandah;
- replacement galvanised roofing, guttering and down pipes;
- window infill along the south boundary laneway.

Key elements of the original interior presentation of the postal areas which appear to be missing and/or altered include:

- subdivision of the postal hall area by the installation of ¾ and full height counter joinery;
- removal of the original timber counter joinery and writing desks;
- alteration (reduction of width) of northeast ground floor window;
- non-original fittings and finishes such as fluorescent lights, mechanical ducting and bulkheads, Australia Post retail joinery, automatic entry doors; painted surfaces, new floor linings, mechanical services;
- additions associated with the rear mail delivery area.

Key elements of the original interior presentation of the residence which are missing and/or altered include:

- non-original fittings and finishes such as fluorescent lights, window coverings, fireplace infill, refurbished kitchen and bathroom, painted wall surfaces and floor coverings.

Externally and internally the building appears to be in relatively sound condition, very well maintained and with no major defects visible. The roof space was not inspected. The provision of mechanical services from the plant through the mail sorting area is intrusive. Some deterioration of the verandah balcony timber was evident in 2008.

== Heritage listing ==
Northam Post Office was listed on the Australian Commonwealth Heritage List on 22 June 2004.

Northam Post Office, erected in 1908 to a design by Hillson Beasley, chief architect of the Western Australian Public Works Department, is important in illustrating the expansion of postal services in Western Australia's rural sector under the combined administration of the Commonwealth Post Department and the Western Australian Public Works Department. The original planning and operation of the building as a combined post office and residence is also relatively intact. This is rare in the national context.

Typologically, Northam Post Office is an example of a post office and residence which are conceived as separate components and skilfully unified into a composite form. Northam Post Office is a good example of the use of the Federation Free Style for public buildings of this period, and is characteristic of the striated style common to Hillson Beasley (Criterion d). The design of the public hall is skilfully manipulated by the introduction of clerestory windows which impart a grand civic scale in an architecturally distinguished building which is a landmark feature in the town and its streetscapes. The striking building successfully employs contrasting red brick and rendered detailing, including a striation of alternating bands ('blood and bandages'). The pedimented roof over the corner hall holds the "anchoring" flanking wings apart, working formally like a Federation corner tower to assert a diagonal line of force against the right-angled intersection. The thickly columned corner verandah, linked to its roof with a thick boarded frieze turning down at the corners over each column, also approximates the heavy round free Romanesque arch in the framework of a trabeated verandah.

The significant components of Northam Post Office include the main 1908 postal building and residential wing. The toilets and staff areas of 1961–62, plant room, store, steel-framed gantry, garage, carport, brick laundry and toilet, and colourbond sheds are not significant. The telephone exchange is also not significant.

== Sources ==
- "Northam Post Office (Place ID 105528)". Australian Heritage Database. Australian Government.
- n.t. AHDb. 2006.
- Savills (June 2005). APPD Property Valuation Report (Report).
- Hamann, Conrad (1985). "Against the mainstream". In Shaw, AGL (ed.). Victoria's Heritage. Sydney: Allen and Unwin.
- Molyneux, Ian, ed. (1981). Looking around Perth: a guide to the architecture of Perth and surrounding towns. Compiled for the Royal Australian Institute of Architects (W.A. Chapter). East Fremantle: Wescolour Press. OCLC 85994799.

== General references ==
- WA Register of Heritage Places (database number 1867)
- Pope, Brian, Historical and Architectural Assessment of Post Offices in WA, owned by Australia Post as at 21 July 1991. An NEGP study.
- GS Warmington and AC Ward, Australia Post Survey of Historic Properties in Western Australia, 1993
- O'Brien Planning Consultants, Town and Shire of Northam Municipal Heritage Inventory, 1998
- Town of Northam, Municipal Inventory of Heritage Places Review - Draft, 2004
- Commonwealth Heritage List, ID 105528
- Register of the National Estate, ID 9955
- Heritage Council of Western Australia, Register of Heritage Places, Database Number 1867
- Marc Fiddian, Six Stamps Please: a Tableau of Australian Post Offices, Pakenham, Gazette, 1989, pp. 60–1
- Donald S. Garden, Northam An Avon Valley History, Melbourne 1979
- Jan Goodacre, The Northam Post and Telegraph Office 1872–1992, AVAS, 1992
