= 2005 WAFL season =

Australian rules football season

- Teams: 9
- Premiers: South Fremantle; 12th premiership
- Minor premiers: Subiaco; 10th minor premiership
- Sandover Medallist: Toby McGrath (South Fremantle)
- Bernie Naylor Medallist: Lachlan Oakley (Subiaco)
- Matches played: 94

The 2005 WAFL season was the 121st season of the various incarnations of the West Australian Football League. It saw reigning premiers Subiaco's third consecutive minor premiership, despite the loss of key forward Brad Smith to the West Coast Eagles and knee surgery. Thirty-year-old reserves spearhead Lachlan Oakley proved a perfect replacement and scored eighty goals in his only full season before moving to Victoria and playing with Parkdale Vultures in the VAFA. The Lions were widely tipped to finish the season undefeated with their perceived depth, discipline and motivation, but after suffering only two defeats in the home-and-away season, the Lions collapsed severely in the finals for South Fremantle to claim their first premiership since 1997. The premiership was a wonderful finalé for Toby McGrath, who retired for an army career after the 2004 season, but returned to WA in February and rejoined the Bulldogs to win both the Sandover and Simpson Medals.

The finalists were unchanged from 2004, and there was an exceptionally wide gap between the top teams and their weakest rivals, with the bottom four clubs winning only four matches against the top five all season. Perennial battlers Perth suffered the largest change in fortune by falling from ten victories to three, but this was generally expected before the season began due to the controversial loss of sixty-goal spearhead Chris Maguire to Swan Districts after the Demons refused to clear him, future Hawthorn and Sydney superstar “Buddy” Franklin and the retiring Drew Cornelius, which left them without almost their entire 2004 goal-to-goal-line.

West Perth, also predicted to struggle due to the retirements of on-ballers Corey Johnson, Brendon Logan and Kim Rigoll, did better than expected after losing several players and continuing their bad injury run of 2004, whilst Peel Thunder, after finally achieving a permanent WAFL licence and not having to prove itself again by 2008, fell back from five wins to three.

The 2005 season saw the WAFL's judicial system use "video evidence", introduced in the VFL/AFL in 1988, for the first time after demands from clubs in previous seasons when several offenders were completely unpunished. This new system was regarded as a success, with the number of reportable offences substantially reduced.

Poor crowds at Subiaco Oval finals meant this was the last season where WAFL matches before the Grand Final would be played there; from 2006 finals were played at the higher-ranked club's home ground. The problem was exacerbated by the issue of the WAFL as a family-orientated league and the lack of facilities for children to kick footballs around Subiaco.

== Home-and-away season ==
=== Round 1 ===
	Round 1
Friday, 18 March (6:45 pm)	South Fremantle 12.15 (87)	def.	East Perth 7.6 (48)	Fremantle Oval (crowd: 2701)
Friday, 18 March (6:45 pm)	Subiaco 19.13 (127)	def.	East Fremantle 6.11 (47)	Leederville Oval (crowd: 1684)
Saturday, 19 March (2:15 pm)	Claremont 10.10 (70)	def.	West Perth 10.9 (69)	Claremont Showground (crowd: 7812)
Saturday, 19 March (2:15 pm)	Swan Districts 18.11 (119)	def.	Peel Thunder 13.9 (87)	Bassendean Oval (crowd: 1805)
	Bye; Perth
East Perth suffer a severe blow with the losses through injury of captain Dean Brennan and vice-captain Craig Wulff, along with deputy Mark Ainley. The Royals press the Bulldogs in the second quarter but score only two goals after half-time.

=== Round 2 (Easter weekend) ===
	Round 2
Saturday, 26 March (2:15 pm)	East Fremantle 10.7 (67)	def. by	Swan Districts 11.15 (81)	East Fremantle Oval (crowd: 1459)
Saturday, 26 March (2:15 pm)	Perth 3.4 (22)	def. by	Subiaco 28.14 (182)	Lathlain Park (crowd: 1579)
Saturday, 26 March (2:15 pm)	Peel Thunder 8.7 (55)	def. by	South Fremantle 19.9 (123)	Rushton Park (crowd: 1434)
Monday, 28 March (2:15 pm)	East Perth 6.12 (48)	def. by	Claremont 19.12 (126)	Leederville Oval (crowd: 2509)
	Bye; West Perth
In a demoralising thrashing for the Demons' opening game, Subiaco record their biggest-ever win, beating 147 points against Peel from 1997.; Perth's score is their lowest against Subiaco since the 1915 Grand Final.; The Demons kicked their first goal two minutes into the third quarter, and their half-time score of two behinds is their lowest-ever against the Lions, and their lowest against any opponent since kicking the same total against East Perth in Round 12, 1923.; 41 possessions from 2003 Sandover winner Shane Beros prevents a huge upset as East Fremantle play with far more commitment under coach Dunbar than they had in 2004. Michael Collica holds Perth recruit Chris Maguire goalless after he kicked seven in the first round.

=== Round 3 ===
	Round 3
Friday, 1 April (6:45 pm)	South Fremantle 9.22 (76)	def.	East Fremantle 5.3 (33)	Fremantle Oval (crowd: 1750)
Saturday, 2 April (2:15 pm)	Swan Districts 21.18 (144)	def.	Perth 10.3 (63)	Bassendean Oval (crowd: 1918)
Saturday, 2 April (2:15 pm)	Claremont 9.14 (68)	def.	Peel Thunder 5.6 (36)	Claremont Oval (crowd: 1245)
Saturday, 2 April (2:15 pm)	West Perth 17.11 (113)	def.	East Perth 7.11 (53)	Arena Joondalup (crowd: 1992)
	Bye; Subiaco
East Fremantle record their fewest scoring shots in a match since Round 15, 1967 against Perth, as South Fremantle's skill in tough conditions with teeming rain allows the team to gain an unassailable lead in the first quarter with the wind.; Peel shock the Tigers with three early goals before the Claremont midfield wears them down completely.

=== Round 4 ===
	Round 4
Friday, 8 April (6:45 pm)	Subiaco 19.12 (126)	def.	Swan Districts 9.10 (64)	Leederville Oval (crowd: 2001)
Saturday, 9 April (2:15 pm)	Peel Thunder 4.1 (25)	def. by	West Perth 17.15 (117)	Rushton Park (crowd: 1679)
Saturday, 9 April (2:15 pm)	Perth 11.5 (71)	def.	South Fremantle 10.8 (68)	Lathlain Park (crowd: 1425)
Sunday, 10 April (2:15 pm)	East Fremantle 8.14 (62)	def. by	Claremont 16.12 (108)	East Fremantle Oval (crowd: 1569)
	Bye; East Perth
Perth produce a superb defensive display into the wind to create a grin of skipper Andrew Glover's face after a pair of crushing defeats. Eagle-listed Damian Adkins has 35 possessions and eight marks for the Demons.; Coach Darren Harris says West Perth remain below their potential peak – with several players to come back from injury — despite crushing Peel, who try to flood the Falcon forward line to no avail.; A severe knee injury to former Melbourne player Darren Kowal takes the gloss off a fourth straight win that puts the Tigers on top – despite having a much lower percentage than Subiaco who had had a bye.

=== Round 5 ===
	Round 5
Friday, 15 April (6:45 pm)	East Perth 17.13 (115)	def.	Peel Thunder 9.8 (62)	Leederville Oval (crowd: 1723)
Friday, 15 April (6:45 pm)	South Fremantle 12.14 (86)	def.	Subiaco 7.11 (53)	Fremantle Oval (crowd: 1989)
Saturday, 16 April (2:15 pm)	Claremont 13.10 (88)	def.	Perth 7.10 (52)	Claremont Oval (crowd: 1458)
Saturday, 16 April (2:15 pm)	West Perth 14.10 (94)	def.	East Fremantle 13.15 (93)	Arena Joondalup (crowd: 1762)
	Bye; Swan Districts
Josh Pearce kicks a 40-metre "bomb" for a behind to deny East Fremantle a draw in a match where the winless Sharks led all day but never really broke clear.

=== Round 6 (Anzac Day) ===
	Round 6
Friday, 22 April (6:45 pm)	Subiaco 18.10 (118)	def.	Claremont 3.6 (24)	Leederville Oval (crowd: 2034)
Saturday, 23 April (2:15 pm)	Perth 10.2 (62)	def. by	West Perth 10.14 (74)	Lathlain Park (crowd: 1583)
Sunday, 24 April (2:15 pm)	East Fremantle 15.14 (104)	def.	East Perth 14.13 (97)	East Fremantle Oval (crowd: 1748)
Monday, 25 April (2:15 pm)	Swan Districts 11.6 (72)	def. by	South Fremantle 12.14 (86)	Bassendean Oval (crowd: 4140)
	Bye; Peel Thunder
Claremont equal their lowest score against Subiaco from 1999, as after an even first forty minutes Subiaco reassert their premiership favouritism by scoring 16.5 (101) to 1.2 (8) for the remainder of the night.; A triple-"soccer" by former Bernie Naylor Medallist Rod Tregenza sees East Fremantle – despite scoring a wasteful 3.6 (24) during ten minutes of continuous attack after half-time – record its first win after eight unbroken competition and pre-season defeats.

=== Round 7 ===
	Round 7
Saturday, 30 April (2:15 pm)	East Perth 14.9 (93)	def.	Perth 12.12 (84)	Leederville Oval (crowd: 1148)
Saturday, 30 April (2:15 pm)	Peel Thunder 11.14 (80)	def.	East Fremantle 10.14 (74)	Rushton Park (crowd: 1227)
Saturday, 30 April (2:15 pm)	Claremont 12.4 (76)	def. by	Swan Districts 21.11 (137)	Claremont Oval (crowd: 1483)
Saturday, 30 April (2:15 pm)	West Perth 7.7 (49)	def. by	Subiaco 13.11 (89)	Arena Joondalup (crowd: 1836)
	Bye; South Fremantle
Swan Districts answers its critics who thought they could not challenge the other top teams with a fine win over a depleted Claremont side.; Subiaco keep ahead in tiring, humid and wet conditions to end West Perth's four-game winning streak, with Oakley's forward work especially impressive with five goals in unfavourable conditions.

=== Round 8 ===
	Round 8
Friday, 6 May (6:45 pm)	Subiaco 21.10 (136)	def.	East Perth 5.5 (35)	Leederville Oval (crowd: 1984)
Saturday, 7 May (2:15 pm)	Perth 14.21 (105)	def.	Peel Thunder 8.13 (61)	Lathlain Park (crowd: 1338)
Saturday, 7 May (2:15 pm)	South Fremantle 11.16 (82)	def. by	Claremont 13.6 (84)	Fremantle Oval (crowd: 1740)
Saturday, 7 May (2:15 pm)	Swan Districts 16.9 (105)	def.	West Perth 11.12 (78)	Bassendean Oval (crowd: 2476)
	Bye; East Fremantle
Claremont sneak home in a thriller after South Fremantle's Hayden North misses from 50 metres out after the siren. South had more of the play but wasted it severely.

=== Round 9 ===
	Round 9
Friday, 13 May (6:45 pm)	East Perth 13.11 (89)	def.	Swan Districts 8.11 (59)	Leederville Oval (crowd: 2161)
Saturday, 14 May (2:15 pm)	Peel Thunder 11.13 (79)	def. by	Subiaco 18.12 (120)	Rushton Park (crowd: 1125)
Saturday, 14 May (2:15 pm)	East Fremantle 16.15 (111)	def.	Perth 12.9 (81)	Geraldton (crowd: 1983)
Sunday, 15 May (2:15 pm)	West Perth 9.12 (66)	def. by	South Fremantle 14.19 (103)	Arena Joondalup (crowd: 1507)
	Bye; Claremont
Toby McGrath shows why he received a state guernsey as he helps South Fremantle kick 10.9 (69) to 1.4 (10) in wet conditions from late in the second quarter.

=== Round 10 ===
	Round 10
Saturday, 21 May (2:15 pm)	East Fremantle 11.8 (74)	def. by	Subiaco 26.9 (165)	East Fremantle Oval (crowd: 1443)
Saturday, 21 May (2:15 pm)	Peel Thunder 13.13 (91)	def. by	Swan Districts 17.12 (114)	Rushton Park (crowd: 1218)
Saturday, 21 May (2:15 pm)	East Perth 15.9 (99)	def. by	South Fremantle 20.13 (133)	Leederville Oval (crowd: 1160)
Saturday, 21 May (2:15 pm)	West Perth 18.11 (119)	def.	Claremont 9.12 (66)	Arena Joondalup (crowd: 1814)
	Bye; Perth
In Brendon "Buzz" Fewster's one hundredth match for the Falcons, West Perth prove themselves a finals contender as Fewster himself kicks seven and WP show they have recovered from major off-season retirements.; Aaron Edwards' – forced to play at full forward because of Maguire's suspension – spectacular marking helps Swan Districts hold off an enthusiastic Peel, who reduce a 59-point deficit early in the third quarter to 22 before Edwards (who finished with six goals) steadied the black and whites.

=== Round 11 ===
	Round 11
Saturday, 28 May (2:15 pm)	Subiaco 25.22 (172)	def.	Perth 7.4 (46)	Leederville Oval (crowd: 1995)
Saturday, 28 May (2:15 pm)	Swan Districts 26.16 (172)	def.	East Fremantle 10.9 (69)	Bassendean Oval (crowd: 2185)
Saturday, 28 May (2:15 pm)	South Fremantle 25.21 (171)	def.	Peel Thunder 5.5 (35)	Fremantle Oval (crowd: 1580)
Saturday, 28 May (2:15 pm)	Claremont 17.10 (112)	def.	East Perth 11.11 (77)	Claremont Oval (crowd: 1474)
	Bye; West Perth
In Travis Edmonds' two hundred and fiftieth match, Canberra recruit Craig Healy shows he has overcome osteitis pubis as he drives Swan Districts to thrash and East Fremantle team with nine members who had played fewer than ten WAFL games.; Peel and South Fremantle wore red armbands for "Belt Up WA", but Peel lacked all the discipline and desire of the second half against Swan Districts, whilst South Fremantle show the premiership is not a one-horse race.; Fremantle discard Des Headland says Subiaco's play in their second annihilation of Perth was "a match for an AFL team". The Lions kicked 14.9 (93) to 1.2 (8) to half-time.

=== Round 12 (Foundation Day) ===
	Round 12
Saturday, 4 June (2:15 pm)	Perth 10.10 (70)	def. by	Swan Districts 14.14 (98)	Lathlain Park (crowd: 2843)
Saturday, 4 June (2:15 pm)	Peel Thunder 13.12 (90)	def. by	Claremont 18.11 (119)	Rushton Park (crowd: 1190)
Monday, 6 June (2:15 pm)	East Fremantle 5.6 (36)	def. by	South Fremantle 13.21 (99)	East Fremantle Oval (crowd: 3262)
Monday, 6 June (2:15 pm)	East Perth 6.12 (48)	def.	West Perth 6.5 (41)	Leederville Oval (crowd: 2724)
	Bye; Subiaco
Perth are 10.1 at half-time but kick only 0.9 (9) in the second half.; A 4.1 (25) to 0.0 (0) second quarter on Perth's wettest football day since 1988 combined with 97 tackles to 62, gives East Perth an upset derby win that leaves the four already sealed at virtually the halfway point of the season before the break for an interstate game.; In front of the smallest Foundation Day Fremantle derby crowd of recent times, East Fremantle – who lost Rod Tregenza for the season – are never in the game despite South Fremantle missing seven set shots during the opening quarter.

=== Round 13 ===
	Round 13
Saturday, 18 June (2:15 pm)	Claremont 18.21 (129)	def.	East Fremantle 7.2 (44)	Claremont Oval (crowd: 1125)
Saturday, 18 June (2:15 pm)	South Fremantle 23.10 (148)	def.	Perth 4.14 (38)	Fremantle Oval (crowd: 1299)
Saturday, 18 June (2:15 pm)	Swan Districts 9.13 (67)	def. by	Subiaco 17.12 (114)	Bassendean Oval (crowd: 2382)
Saturday, 18 June (2:15 pm)	West Perth 17.16 (118)	def.	Peel Thunder 9.3 (57)	Arena Joondalup (crowd: 1058)
	Bye; East Perth
Peel's Rob Hillier was suspended on video evidence after West Perth's Mark Gilhorne complained of a broken jaw when shepherding a teammate, (Note: Peel officials saw the incident as a fair "hip-and-shoulder".) but the Thunder are never in the game at any point.

=== Round 14 ===
	Round 14
Saturday, 25 June (2:15 pm)	Subiaco 17.7 (109)	def.	South Fremantle 12.15 (87)	Leederville Oval (crowd: 2890)
Saturday, 25 June (2:15 pm)	East Perth 24.8 (152)	def.	Peel Thunder 9.6 (60)	Donnybrook (crowd: 1648)
Saturday, 25 June (2:15 pm)	East Fremantle 10.8 (68)	def.	West Perth 7.17 (59)	East Fremantle Oval (crowd: 1317)
Saturday, 25 June (2:15 pm)	Perth 9.11 (65)	def. by	Claremont 19.8 (122)	Lathlain Park (crowd: 1310)
	Bye; Swan Districts
East Fremantle, with their strongest team for 2005, records a shock win over a wasteful West Perth – who are within fifty metres of goal 53 times to 32 – to leave the Falcons remaining two games from fourth position with a fairly tough remaining draw.; The return of Eagle-listed Zach Beeck inspires East Perth – playing in their country zone – to a big victory that leaves them a very faint finals chance. The Royals' key forwards crushed Peel, who took far too many wrong options.

=== Round 15 ===
	Round 15
Saturday, 2 July (2:15 pm)	South Fremantle 20.19 (139)	def.	Swan Districts 13.15 (93)	Fremantle Oval (crowd: 1582)
Saturday, 2 July (2:15 pm)	Claremont 14.6 (90)	def. by	Subiaco 15.4 (94)	Claremont Oval (crowd: 1463)
Sunday, 3 July (2:15 pm)	East Perth 10.14 (74)	def. by	East Fremantle 10.15 (75)	Leederville Oval (crowd: 1614)
Sunday, 3 July (2:15 pm)	West Perth 9.14 (68)	def.	Perth 6.16 (52)	Arena Joondalup (crowd: 1789)
	Bye; Peel Thunder
Despite Claremont managing to exploit Subiaco's achilles heel – lack of height – Allistair Pickett's ability to pounce on minor errors kills the Tigers in a tight finish, although Subiaco lost four key players before the game and during the first half.; Despite two horrible errors in kicking, East Fremantle's Joel Aofi becomes a hero when he snaps a behind on the siren to deny East Perth two points.

=== Round 16 ===
	Round 16
Saturday, 9 July (2:15 pm)	Subiaco 8.10 (58)	def. by	West Perth 12.13 (85)	Leederville Oval (crowd: 2219)
Saturday, 9 July (2:15 pm)	Swan Districts 12.12 (84)	def.	Claremont 9.8 (62)	Bassendean Oval (crowd: 2250)
Saturday, 9 July (2:15 pm)	East Fremantle 14.12 (96)	def.	Peel Thunder 8.12 (60)	East Fremantle Oval (crowd: 1273)
Saturday, 9 July (2:15 pm)	Perth 13.8 (86)	def. by	East Perth 15.9 (99)	Lathlain Park (crowd: 1528)
	Bye; South Fremantle
West Perth produce an outstanding defensive display and ferocious tackling to upset the Lions, only failing to enter the four because of Swan Districts' win.; Despite over half the league team being hit by a flu epidemic, and coach Warren Mahony being so ill when he arrived at the ground he could not speak, (Note: Shane Cable, son of former superstar Barry – who had played for and coached both teams – took over as Royals coach for the afternoon.) East Perth register a morale-boosting win with nine goals to five in the second half.

=== Round 17 ===
	Round 17
Saturday, 16 July (2:15 pm)	Peel Thunder 10.10 (70)	def. by	Perth 13.13 (91)	Rushton Park (crowd: 1049)
Saturday, 16 July (2:15 pm)	West Perth 13.10 (88)	def. by	Swan Districts 16.13 (109)	Arena Joondalup (crowd: 2299)
Saturday, 16 July (2:15 pm)	Claremont 15.4 (94)	def. by	South Fremantle 15.9 (99)	Claremont Oval (crowd: 1757)
Saturday, 16 July (2:15 pm)	East Perth 10.7 (67)	def. by	Subiaco 24.24 (168)	Leederville Oval (crowd: 1835)
	Bye; East Fremantle
After a loss and a narrow victory Subiaco return to their best to crush the Royals, with Cain Hayes moving to centre half-forward and leading a devastating forward line.; Swan Districts with the battle for fourth with a matchwinning move of Adam Lange to the centre, where he consistently clears the ball from congestion during the second half.; Former Docker defender Roger Hayden is the hero for South Fremantle with a match-saving mark in his first match since Round 2 after a broken leg and hamstring strains.

=== Round 18 ===
	Round 18
Saturday, 23 July (2:15 pm)	Swan Districts 17.8 (110)	def.	East Perth 10.11 (71)	Bassendean Oval (crowd: 2365)
Saturday, 23 July (2:15 pm)	Perth 10.8 (68)	def. by	East Fremantle 23.7 (145)	Lathlain Park (crowd: 1425)
Saturday, 23 July (2:15 pm)	Subiaco 12.12 (84)	def.	Peel Thunder 7.9 (51)	Esperance (crowd: 2394)
Saturday, 23 July (2:15 pm)	South Fremantle 19.19 (133)	def.	West Perth 11.6 (72)	Fremantle Oval (crowd: 1592)
	Bye; Claremont
West Perth's loss virtually seals the four after each clubs has had two byes, whilst a soaring mark by Paul Mugambwa (of whom it was said "he has the vertical leap of Michael Jordan" has the whole audience in awe.

=== Round 19 ===
	Round 19
Saturday, 30 July (2:15 pm)	East Fremantle 8.6 (54)	def. by	Claremont 24.13 (157)	East Fremantle Oval (crowd: 1389)
Saturday, 30 July (6:00 pm)	Peel Thunder 6.7 (43)	def. by	South Fremantle 18.10 (118)	Rushton Park (crowd: 1746)
	Bye; East Perth, Perth, Subiaco, Swan Districts, West Perth
Claremont record their biggest win over East Fremantle, beating 102 points from Round 13 of 1981. Rowan Jones has an amazing forty-eight possessions and eight marks.

=== Round 20 ===
	Round 20
Friday, 5 August (6:45 pm)	South Fremantle 20.18 (138)	def.	East Fremantle 8.9 (57)	Fremantle Oval (crowd: 2554)
Saturday, 6 August (2:15 pm)	Subiaco 8.10 (58)	def.	Perth 8.8 (56)	Leederville Oval (crowd: 1532)
Saturday, 6 August (2:15 pm)	Claremont 20.8 (128)	def.	Swan Districts 12.12 (84)	Claremont Oval (crowd: 1910)
Saturday, 6 August (2:15 pm)	West Perth 19.12 (126)	def.	East Perth 10.6 (66)	Arena Joondalup (crowd: 1978)
	Bye; Peel Thunder
Perth come within two points of a huge upset in a very low-scoring match considering the weather was dry. The Demons played two spare men in defence to try and bottle up the Lions, and only the unusual policy of playing 196 centimetres (6 ft 5 in) ruckman Luke Newick on the wing stretched Perth's big-man reserves enough to create a narrowly decisive burst of three goals during the third quarter.

=== Round 21 ===
	Round 21
Saturday, 13 August (2:15 pm)	Swan Districts 11.11 (77)	def.	Perth 9.14 (68)	Bassendean Oval (crowd: 1532)
Saturday, 13 August (2:15 pm)	Claremont 14.4 (88)	def.	West Perth 8.11 (59)	Claremont Oval (crowd: 1301)
Saturday, 13 August (2:15 pm)	East Fremantle 8.6 (54)	def. by	Subiaco 12.10 (82)	East Fremantle Oval (crowd: 1188)
Saturday, 13 August (2:15 pm)	East Perth 7.6 (48)	def. by	Peel Thunder 13.17 (95)	Leederville Oval (crowd: 1147)
	Bye; South Fremantle
East Perth kick the lowest score to date against Peel, beating West Perth's 7.8 (50) from 2002. As of 2014 it still remains one point shy of the lowest score conceded by the Thunder until 2015.; The Royals' 1.2 (8) – pitiful even with wet conditions and a depleted side – constitutes the lowest score against Peel for any half, as the Thunder's second win for 2005 is sparked by eighteen-year-old Ash Thornton.; Although Swan Districts' solid wet-weather win absolutely seals the top four, coach Steve Turner has to deal with media criticism of the black and whites' worthiness for the finals, and a second-half comeback by Perth that sees them score 7.7 (49) to 3.4 (22) after the long interval.

=== Round 22 ===
	Round 22
Saturday, 20 August (2:15 pm)	East Perth 11.7 (73)	def. by	Claremont 16.3 (99)	Leederville Oval (crowd: 1417)
Saturday, 20 August (2:15 pm)	Swan Districts 12.7 (79)	def. by	Subiaco 17.12 (114)	Bassendean Oval (crowd: 2010)
Saturday, 20 August (2:15 pm)	West Perth 20.13 (133)	def.	Peel Thunder 8.8 (56)	Arena Joondalup (crowd: 1799)
Saturday, 20 August (2:15 pm)	Perth 5.8 (38)	def. by	South Fremantle 16.14 (110)	Lathlain Park (crowd: 1431)
	Bye; East Fremantle
Claremont kick their most accurate score with over fifteen scoring shots, beating 24.5 against Perth in 1994.; Despite crushing the Demons, South Fremantle face the loss of Roger Hayden and Tommy Corbett-Wynn and lesser injuries to Ryan Murphy and Matt Clucas, yet show themselves clearly ready for the crucial challenge of Subiaco.

=== Round 23 ===
	Round 23
Friday, 26 August (6:45 pm)	South Fremantle 16.9 (105)	def.	Swan Districts 12.11 (83)	Fremantle Oval (crowd: 2645)
Saturday, 27 August (2:15 pm)	Peel Thunder 15.13 (103)	def.	East Fremantle 11.10 (76)	Rushton Park (crowd: 1275)
Saturday, 27 August (2:15 pm)	Perth 8.15 (63)	def. by	West Perth 13.13 (91)	Lathlain Park (crowd: 1341)
Saturday, 27 August (2:15 pm)	Subiaco 13.9 (87)	def.	East Perth 13.7 (85)	Leederville Oval (crowd: 1464)
	Bye; Claremont
Only the skill of Matt Priddis and the strength of Darren Rumble gets Subiaco out of an expected easy game – failing to provide the needed preparation for South Fremantle. East Perth, though badly depleted and losing their sixth match in a row, showed encouraging ferocity at the ball.; A seven goal to none last quarter – following an eight goal to one third quarter by East Fremantle – is praised by Peel coach Garry Hocking as their most character-laden effort in his time at the club, but fails to avoid last place by two percent.

== Ladder ==
2005 WAFL ladder
Pos	Team	Pld	W	L	D	PF	PA	PP	Pts
1	Subiaco	20	18	2	0	2256	1247	180.9	72
2	South Fremantle (P)	20	17	3	0	2191	1279	171.3	68
3	Claremont	20	14	6	0	1910	1546	123.5	56
4	Swan Districts	20	12	8	0	1951	1791	108.9	48
5	West Perth	20	11	9	0	1719	1464	117.4	44
6	East Perth	20	6	14	0	1537	1963	78.3	24
7	East Fremantle	20	6	14	0	1439	2050	70.2	24
8	Perth	20	3	17	0	1281	2079	61.6	12
9	Peel Thunder	20	3	17	0	1296	2161	60.0	12

Rules for classification: 1) points; 2) percentage; 3) number of points for.
(P) Premiers

== Finals ==
=== Semi-finals ===
	First semi-final
Saturday, 3 September (11:45 am)	Claremont 16.14 (110)	def.	Swan Districts 11.6 (72)	Subiaco Oval (crowd: 5,175)
Three time-on goals during the first quarter give Claremont a comfortable lead that Swan Districts do not ever look like pegging back despite playing with dogged determination.

	Second semi-final
Saturday, 3 September (2:15 pm)	Subiaco 6.6 (42)	def. by	South Fremantle 14.18 (102)	Subiaco Oval (crowd: 5,121)
When regular centreman Gault is forced from the field, the super-fit Kieren Ugle takes over and demolishes a Lion team that showed signs it was not at its best during July and August.

=== Preliminary final ===
	Preliminary final
Saturday, 10 September (2:15 pm)	Subiaco 11.6 (72)	def. by	Claremont 14.12 (96)	Subiaco Oval (crowd: 5,023)
Claremont fought back from a thirty point deficit early in the second quarter against the disappointing Lions – who cannot move the ball down the centre with any effect.

=== Grand Final ===
2005 WAFL Grand Final
Sunday, 18 September (2:15 pm)	South Fremantle	def.	Claremont	Subiaco Oval (crowd: 22,570)
5.2 (32); 9.3 (57); 13.4 (82); 17.8 (110)	Q1; Q2; Q3; Final	3.1 (19); 5.3 (33); 6.8 (44); 7.12 (54)	Umpires: Luke Farmer, Mark Fussell, Greg Bandy; Simpson Medal: Toby McGrath (South Fremantle)
Adams 4, Toby McGrath 3, Cornell 3, Kyle Hams 2, Kieren Ugle, Crawford, Hewitt, Ashton Hams	Goals	Crawford 2, Walton, Dodd, Quinn, Leon Wilson, Morton
Adams, Toby McGrath, Graham, North, C. Jones, Crawford, Tipuamantamerri	Best	Trent Carroll, Quinn, Warren, Handley, Cousins
Hayden (knee), North (knee)	Injuries
Reports	Trent Carroll (striking); Leon Wilson (wrestling); B. Dodd (striking Even Hewitt and unduly rough play); Delaney (attempted tripping); Carlton (striking)
Toby McGrath, following his Sandover win, produces an outstanding display in the second quarter to give South Fremantle a lead Claremont never possess a chance of pegging back.; In a remarkable error, Clint Jones was originally given the Simpson Medal after McGrath had been judged to have won.
