= Elizabeth Backhouse =

Australia novelist, scriptwriter and playwright

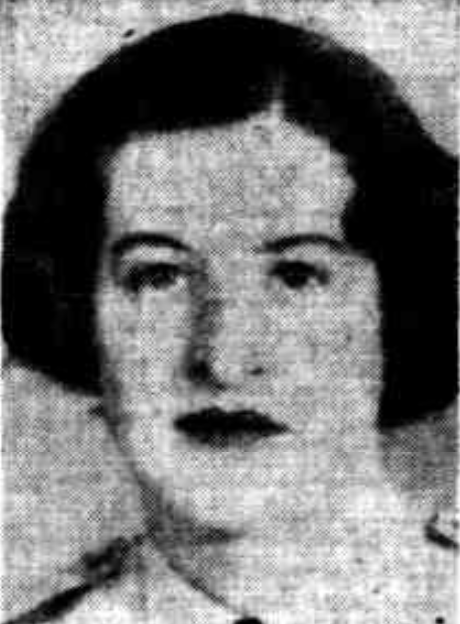
- Backhouse c. 1946
- Born: Enid Elizabeth Backhouse; 21 May 1917; Northam, Western Australia
- Died: 28 April 2013 (aged 95); North Perth, Western Australia
- Occupations: Novelist; scriptwriter; playwright
- Notable work: Against Time and Place

Enid Elizabeth Backhouse (21 May 1917 — 28 April 2013) was an Australian novelist, scriptwriter and playwright, best known for her family history Against Time and Place.

== Early life ==
Backhouse was born on 21 May 1917 in Northam, Western Australia, the second child and only daughter of William Backhouse, a violinist and railway worker, and his wife Hilda, née Booth, a piano teacher. She learned violin and piano from her parents, and attended the local government school. A sexual assault when she was a girl changed her life: her vision and speech were affected, and her schoolwork and hopes for university suffered.

== Career ==
=== WAAAF and first novels ===
At the start of WWII, Backhouse joined the Women's Auxiliary Australian Air Force and was stationed near Melbourne. There, she wrote her first three novels while off-duty. In Our Hands (1942), set in Perth, concerned "a group of interesting young moderns ... brought sharply up against the war"; it was considered to be "a forerunner of good things to come", "the characterisation in some cases excellent and the dialogue bright". It was so popular that it went into a second edition. Her second book, The Sky Has Its Clouds (1944), was "a colourful novel involving the fortunes of an interesting group of people, with a ballerina in the leading role", and covered the period from 1920 to the outbreak of war, moving from a small Australian country town to Europe. One reviewer found it "very entertaining", another judged it "a well-constructed, fast-moving tale which holds the reader's interest from first page to last", and another considered that with it, "Miss Backhouse has established a very definite place for herself in the community of Australian authors."

Backhouse's third novel, Day Will Break (1945), took as its setting France and England during the time of the French revolution. Reviews were mixed, with critics' opinions ranging from "skilfully written", "ambitious ... strong enough to overcome [its] handicap[s]", to "readable", "too long", "rather dull". However, it "enjoy[ed] a great vogue", and appeared in a second edition.
Backhouse published two books in 1946, one a children's story, Enone and Quentin, and the other a modern novel, Leaves in the Wind, set in Western Australia and featuring three young women and their mothers. Enone and Quentin, "a fairy book full of romance and make-believe", was warmly received, with one reviewer describing it as "sheer delight, with fantasy as free as a child's heart." The same reviewer wrote that "it seems Miss Backhouse shudders away from suffering ... and cannot ask her readers to face anything but a happy ending", and that Leaves in the Wind, "a story of 3 illegitimate girls, is literally too good to be true."

=== England and screenwriting ===
In mid 1946, Backhouse travelled to England, where she lived for five years and worked for film producer Alexander Korda, writing scenarios.

=== Return to Australia; crime novels ===
She returned to Australia in 1951, and continued writing novels, demonstrating the versatility noted by reviewers by "producing a series of strongly-imagined and fluently-written crime novels". During the 1950s and 1960s, she published one novella and six novels in this genre. The novella, A Wreath for the Party, appeared as a supplement to the Australian Women's Weekly in August 1954. The novel Death Came Uninvited, published in 1957 by Robert Hale of London, is an expanded version of the same story. It is set in London, with Inspector Christopher Marsden detecting, and was described as a "neatly devised work[] of homicide". Several of the novels were set in Western Australia - Death of a Clown (1962), for example, featured a circus troupe visiting Carnarvon, The Web of Shadows (1960) and Death Climbs a Hill (1963) were set in the bush, and The Mists Came Down (1959) takes place on Rottnest Island. Most featured two Western Australian police detectives, Detective-Inspector Prentis and Detective Sergeant Landles. The hero of The Mists Came Down, Steve Gillman, however, was an American private detective, "a thoughtful, intelligent hero in the English tradition, who solves a murder in a closed community with a measured calm that came to typify later Backhouse efforts."

=== Script writing ===
After Death Climbs a Hill, Backhouse published no further crime novels, but instead turned to writing for stage and screen. The Thin Line, a play about euthanasia, was professionally read at the Emerald Hill Theatre, Melbourne, in 1966, and performed at the Playhouse Theatre, Perth, in 1968. Mirage was performed at the Octagon Theatre, Crawley, Western Australia, in 1972, and had a play reading by the Melbourne Theatre Company in 1986. The Olive Tree (1975) was a 70 minute film for TV written and co-produced by Backhouse, which screened in Australia and the US. Set on a Western Australian cattle station, it involved a "farmer .. united with his son after 20 years, when he decides to sell his property. The meeting is marked with emotional outbursts from both father and son." Backhouse also wrote the scenario for a ballet, KAL, which was performed by the West Australian Ballet in 1979 for the 150th anniversary of the founding of the state of Western Australia, and a musical, Dickens’ Magic.

=== Family history ===
Backhouse's final published works were family history and memoir. Against Time and Place (1990) relates the stories of four generations of her family, particularly the women, in Yorkshire, England and then in Western Australia and other Australian states. It "combines fact, legend and re-creations of dialogue", and received largely positive reviews. One reviewer commented that Backhouse "tells the story with humour and a direct simplicity ... it's a joy to read". Another reviewer found it "indigestible" when attempting to read it as a whole, but good for "dipping into .... a poignant composition of beautifully drawn tableaus and vignettes". Extracts from Against Time and Place were published in several anthologies during the 1990s. and it has been described as ranking "with such successes as Facey's A Fortunate Life and Sally Morgan's My Place."

== Personal life ==
Backhouse had returned to Australia in 1951 because her father was seriously ill. While working during the day, she cared for him until his death in 1952. When her mother Hilda's health began to fail some years later, Backhouse brought her mother to live with her. They lived together for twenty-three years, until Hilda's death in 1984; for the last ten years, Hilda was bedridden. Backhouse worked for an insurance company in Perth. She was a member of the Fellowship of Australian Writers (WA), and served as a committee member and vice-president. A regular church-goer in her childhood, she later became a Freemason and a believer in reincarnation. Backhouse died in North Perth, Western Australia, on 28 April 2013.

== Selected works ==
- 1942 In Our Hands (contemporary novel)
- 1944 The Sky Has Its Clouds (contemporary novel)
- 1946 Enone and Quentin (children's book, illustrated by Irene Carter)
- 1957 Death Came Uninvited (Inspector Marsden mystery)
- 1959 The Mists Came Down (PI Steve Gillman mystery)
- 1962 Death of a Clown (Prentis and Landles mystery)
- 1963 Death Climbs a Hill (Prentis and Landles mystery)
- 1975 The Olive Tree (TV drama)
- 1979 KAL (ballet)
- 1990 Against Time and Place (family history)
