= Stephen Milosz =

Australian cricketer (1955–2022)

Personal information
- Full name: Stephen Joseph Milosz
- Born: 26 December 1955; Northam, Western Australia
- Died: 20 July 2022 (aged 66); Fremantle, Western Australia
- Batting: Right-handed
- Bowling: Leg break

Domestic team information
- Years: Team
- 1983/84–1985/86: Western Australia
- 1986/87: Tasmania
- 1987/88: Western Australia

Career statistics
Competition	First-class	List A
Matches	21	3
Runs scored	68	5
Batting average	6.18	–
100s/50s	0/0	0/0
Top score	29	3*
Balls bowled	3,983	168
Wickets	44	2
Bowling average	44.88	70.50
5 wickets in innings	2	0
10 wickets in match	0	0
Best bowling	6/153	2/60
Catches/stumpings	7/–	1/–
- Source: Cricinfo, 4 January 2011

Stephen Joseph Milosz (26 December 1955 – 20 July 2022) was an Australian cricketer, who played first-class cricket for Western Australia from 1983–84 to 1985–86, and then for Tasmania in 1986–87, before returning to Western Australia for his final first-class season in 1987–88. He was a right-arm leg-spin bowler.
