= Acacia tetraneura =

Conservation status
- Priority One — Poorly Known Taxa (DEC)

- Vulnerable (IUCN 3.1)

Scientific classification
- Kingdom: Plantae
- Clade: Tracheophytes
- Clade: Angiosperms
- Clade: Eudicots
- Clade: Rosids
- Order: Fabales
- Family: Fabaceae
- Subfamily: Caesalpinioideae
- Clade: Mimosoid clade
- Genus: Acacia
- Species: A. tetraneura

Binomial name
- Acacia tetraneura Maslin & A.R.Chapman
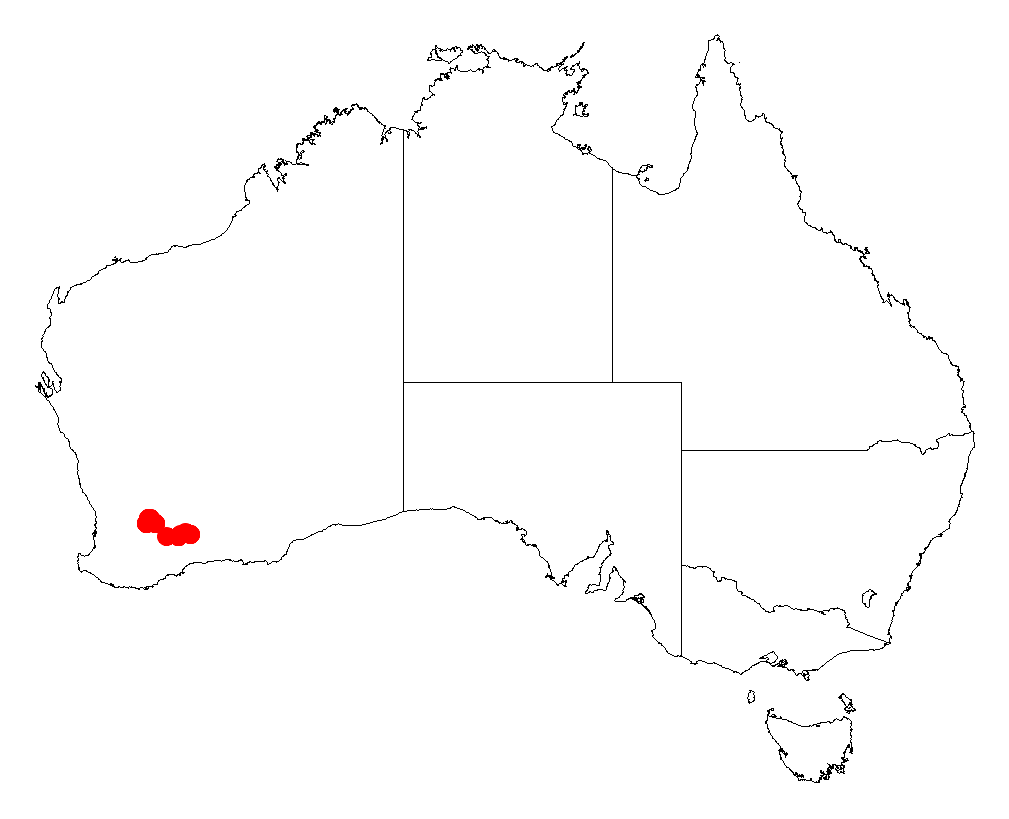
- Occurrence data from AVH

Species of legume

Acacia tetraneura is a shrub belonging to the genus Acacia and the subgenus Juliflorae that is endemic to western Australia.

== Description ==
The slow spreading shrub typically grows to a height of 0.3 to 0.4 metres (1 to 1 ft) and has a flat-topped habit. It has glabrous and resinous branchlets than can be sparsely haired at the ends. Like most species of Acacia it has phyllodes rather than true leaves. The erect, terete or flat blue-green coloured phyllodes have a linear to narrowly oblong shape and are often mostly shallowly incurved. The rigid phyllodes have a length of 2 to 7 cm (0.79 to 2.76 in) and a width of 1.5 to 3 mm (0.059 to 0.118 in) and have four broad and prominent flat-topped, broad nerves with a central nerve prominently raised over the others. It blooms from May to July producing yellow flowers. The simple inflorescences usually occur as pairs in the axils with spherical to shortly obloid shaped flower-heads that have a diameter of about 5 mm (0.20 in) and contain 13 to 20 light golden coloured flowers. The glabrous, coriaceous-crustaceous seed pods that form after flowering have a linear shape but are slightly constricted between each of the seeds. The pods are straight or twisted with a length of up to 5 cm (2.0 in) and a width of 2 to 3 mm (0.079 to 0.118 in) with broad margins. The grey-brown mottled seeds have an obloid shape with a length of 2 to 2.5 mm (0.079 to 0.098 in).

== Distribution ==
It is native to an area in the Wheatbelt region of Western Australia where is commonly situated on low ridges and rises growing in clay soils with lateritic gravel. It is found around the Bruce Rock area in areas to the south west of Hyden where it is a part of open heathland communities.

== See also ==
- List of Acacia species
