= Ashley McGrath =

Australian rules footballer, born 1983

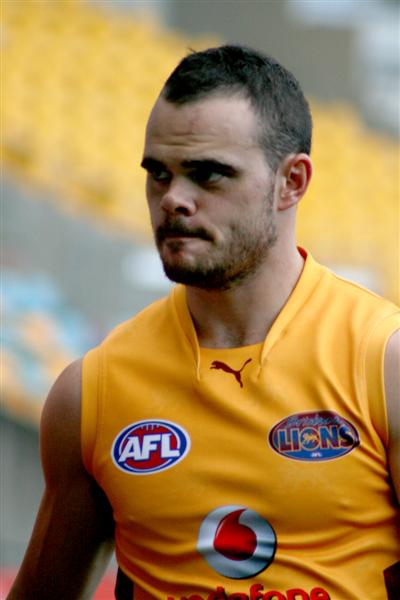
- McGrath with the Brisbane Lions in 2008

Personal information
- Full name: Ashley Vernon McGrath
- Nicknames: Ash, Boonj
- Born: 20 May 1983 (age 43); Northam, Western Australia, Australia
- Original team: South Fremantle (WAFL)
- Draft: 1. 13, 2000 National Draft, Brisbane Lions
- Height: 183 cm (6 ft 0 in)
- Weight: 82 kg (181 lb)
- Position: Forward

Playing career^{1}
Years	Club	Games (Goals)
2001–2014	Brisbane Lions	214 (170)

Representative team honours^{2}
Years	Team	Games (Goals)
2009	Indigenous All-Stars	1 (0)
2013	Australia	2 (0)
- ^{1} Playing statistics correct to the end of Round 22, 2014.^{2} Representative statistics correct as of 2013.

Career highlights
- Brisbane Lions premiership player 2003; Jim Stynes medallist 2013

Ashley Vernon McGrath (born 20 May 1983) is a retired Indigenous Australian rules footballer who played for the Brisbane Lions in the Australian Football League.

Selected in the 2000 AFL draft with the thirteenth pick overall, the Brisbane Lions recruited the talented forward, where he made his AFL debut late in 2001. He continued to establish himself in the side and by 2003, was a regular member, being part of the Lions' third straight AFL premiership.

In 2005 he found more opportunities up forward with the retirement of other forwards Craig McRae and Alastair Lynch.

McGrath has two brothers who were also listed at AFL clubs, Toby and Cory.

During periods of the 2008 season, McGrath was trialed as a rebounding half back flanker with varying degrees of success.

McGrath's 2009 season was of two halves. His first half of the season was smeared with poor performances and ineffective disposals. But after the mid-season break, McGrath had a career-best game where he had 30 disposals against Geelong in Round 15. He then went on to play the remainder of the season averaging more than 20 disposals a game.

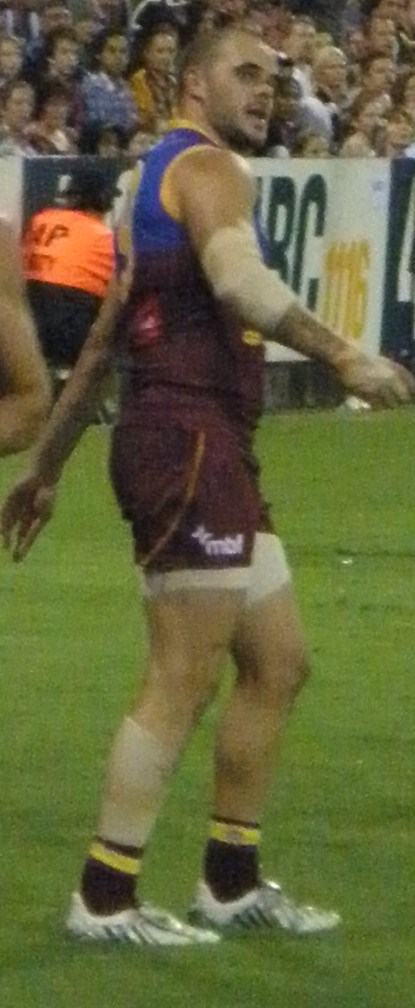
Ashley McGrath in 2009

McGrath is also a cousin with former AFL player Dion Woods.

In round 13, 2013, McGrath, playing his 200th AFL game, kicked a goal after the siren to win the Lions the game against Geelong, becoming only the 36th AFL player to do so. This match became known as the "Miracle on Grass".

McGrath was selected as the Australia international rules football team's goalkeeper for the 2013 International Rules Series in Ireland. Australia lost the series 2-0, with a 173-72 aggregate score. McGrath was the only Brisbane Lions player selected for the team.

McGrath announced his retirement on 21 August 2014; he retired as the last remaining player from any of the Brisbane Lions' triple premiership-winning sides.

== Statistics ==
Legend
G	Goals	K	Kicks	D	Disposals	T	Tackles
B	Behinds	H	Handballs	M	Marks

Season	Team	No.	Games	Totals							Averages (per game)						
Season	Team	No.	Games	G	B	K	H	D	M	T	G	B	K	H	D	M	T
2001	Brisbane Lions	9	1	0	0	1	0	1	0	0	0.0	0.0	1.0	0.0	1.0	0.0	0.0
2002	Brisbane Lions	9	9	0	0	41	12	53	17	18	0.0	0.0	4.6	1.3	5.9	1.9	2.0
2003	Brisbane Lions	9	22	13	9	150	51	201	62	39	0.6	0.4	6.8	2.3	9.1	2.8	1.8
2004	Brisbane Lions	9	19	12	14	130	50	180	50	46	0.6	0.7	6.8	2.6	9.5	2.6	2.4
2005	Brisbane Lions	9	21	35	15	123	58	181	43	48	1.7	0.7	5.9	2.8	8.6	2.0	2.3
2006	Brisbane Lions	9	11	14	9	64	27	91	23	24	1.3	0.8	5.8	2.5	8.3	2.1	2.2
2007	Brisbane Lions	9	15	22	17	83	41	124	36	23	1.5	1.1	5.5	2.7	8.3	2.4	1.5
2008	Brisbane Lions	9	15	3	6	104	78	182	45	35	0.2	0.4	6.9	5.2	12.1	3.0	2.3
2009	Brisbane Lions	9	24	7	5	255	148	403	140	53	0.3	0.2	10.6	6.2	16.8	5.8	2.2
2010	Brisbane Lions	9	18	3	4	192	111	303	86	52	0.2	0.2	10.7	6.2	16.8	4.8	2.9
2011	Brisbane Lions	9	21	26	12	188	91	279	69	75	1.2	0.6	9.0	4.3	13.3	3.3	3.6
2012	Brisbane Lions	9	12	11	8	113	69	182	49	32	0.9	0.7	9.4	5.8	15.2	4.1	2.7
2013	Brisbane Lions	9	20	19	11	129	65	194	44	45	1.0	0.6	6.5	3.3	9.7	2.2	2.3
2014	Brisbane Lions	9	5	4	5	21	9	30	10	10	0.8	1.0	4.2	1.8	6.0	2.0	2.0
Career			213	169	115	1594	810	2404	674	500	0.8	0.5	7.5	3.8	11.3	3.2	2.3
