= Muresk Institute =

Agricultural educational facility in Western Australia

Coordinates: 31°44′57″S 116°41′02″E

Muresk Institute is an educational, training, research, conference and function facility based in Northam, situated approximately 90 kilometres (56 mi) east of Perth, in the Wheatbelt region of Western Australia. Until 1985 it was known as Muresk Agricultural College.

The College, situated on 898 hectares (2,220 acres) of research and farming land, was established in 1926 by the Western Australian Government and incorporated into the Western Australian Institute of Technology (WAIT) in 1969. The college was managed by WAIT and later Curtin University of Technology from 1969 until 2012, when responsibility for Muresk's operation was transferred from Curtin to the State Government. The Department of Training and Workforce Development established the Muresk Institute as a multi-tenanted, multi-functional facility for training, higher education, research, professional development and learning extension.

Muresk Institute offers a wide range of nationally accredited courses, as well as workshops and professional development, hand-picked from leading training providers and industry experts across the country. Training delivered on site includes the Diploma of Agribusiness Management, Diploma of Agriculture and other industry-driven short courses. Curtin University offers an Associate Degree in Agribusiness at Muresk and at the Geraldton Universities Centre, with the intensive laboratory elements delivered at Muresk.

Muresk Institute is home to Western Australia’s first demonstration SMART Farm which uses cloud-based technology, sensors and global positioning systems to provide farmers with data to make highly informed choices and improve efficiency.

Muresk Institute is also a highly equipped conference and accommodation venue suitable for corporate and community events.
