= Cory McGrath =

Australian rules footballer (born 1979)

Personal information
- Full name: Cory McGrath
- Born: 4 February 1979 (age 47); Northam, Western Australia
- Original team: South Fremantle
- Draft: 2000 Rookie Elevation (Essendon)
- Height: 184 cm (6 ft 0 in)
- Weight: 86 kg (190 lb)
- Position: Midfielder

Playing career^{1}
Years	Club	Games (Goals)
2001–2003	Essendon	28 (14)
2004–2006	Carlton	50 (4)
Total		78 (18)
- ^{1} Playing statistics correct to the end of 2006.

Cory McGrath (born 4 February 1979) is a former professional Australian rules footballer who played with the Carlton and Essendon Football Clubs in the Australian Football League (AFL), South Fremantle in the West Australian Football League (WAFL), South Adelaide in the South Australian National Football League (SANFL) and the Northern Bullants and Port Melbourne in the Victorian Football League (VFL).

== AFL career ==
He started his career after being elevated from the rookie list by Essendon in 2000, and made his AFL debut in 2001. The West Australian had been noted as an exciting midfielder and when he arrived at Carlton as part of the Blues' refill of recycled players in the 2003 draft/trade period, he made a good impression during 2004. He broke his way into the team from Carlton's VFL-affiliate, the Northern Bullants, midway through the year and played every game from then on. 2005 was another step up for McGrath, who played 19 games but was considered one of the better players in a dismal year for the Blues.

He again played 19 games in 2006, generally playing a tagging role rotated through the midfield, where he is noted as a hard ball winner. Although less successful as a traditional defender, his tagging roles were often performed in the backline. Despite his good season, McGrath was delisted at the end of 2006, at the age of 27.

== Post-AFL ==
McGrath played the 2007 season with the South Adelaide Football Club in the SANFL. He then spent five seasons playing with the Port Melbourne Football Club in the VFL, where he was part of the Borough's unbeaten 2011 premiership team. McGrath retired from football at the end of 2011.

== Personal life ==
McGrath has three brothers, two of whom are both former AFL players, Toby, who played for the West Coast Eagles and Essendon, and Ashley, who played for the Brisbane Lions and Bradley. He has two children Coen & Lani.
