= Northam, Western Australia =

Town in Wheatbelt region in Western Australia

Northam
- Town
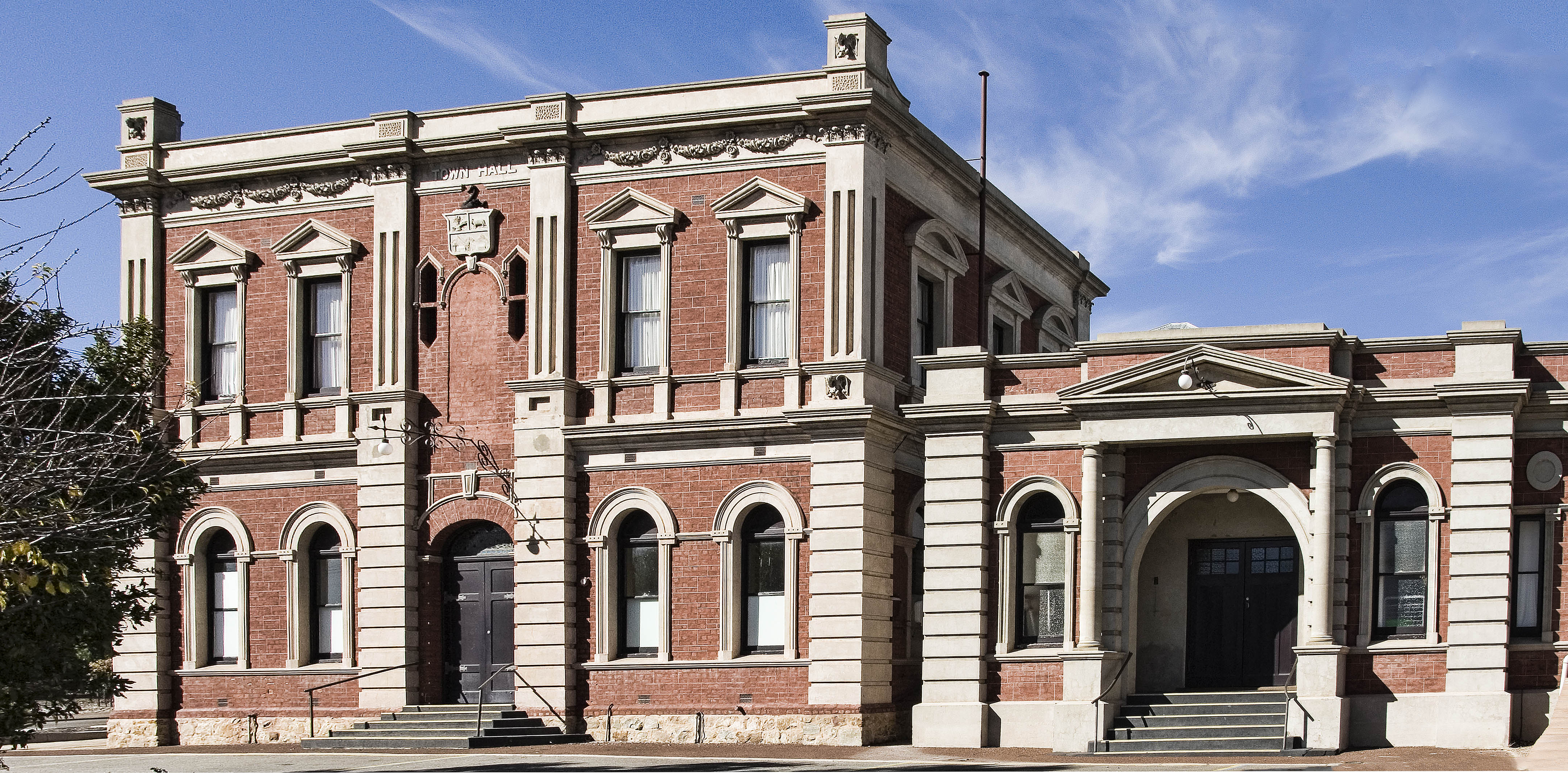
- Northam Town Hall

- Interactive map of Northam
- Coordinates: 31°39′11″S 116°39′58″E
- Country: Australia
- State: Western Australia
- Region: Wheatbelt
- LGA: Shire of Northam
- Location: 96 km (60 mi) from Perth
- Established: 1833

Government
  - State electorate: Central Wheatbelt
  - Federal division: Bullwinkel

Area
  - Total: 26.8 km^{2} (10.3 sq mi)
- Elevation: 170 m (560 ft)

Population
  - Total: 6,679 (SAL 2021)
- Postcode: 6401
- Mean max temp: 25.2 °C (77.4 °F)
- Mean min temp: 10.9 °C (51.6 °F)
- Annual rainfall: 429.3 mm (16.90 in)

Northam is a town in the Wheatbelt region of Western Australia, situated at the confluence of the Avon and Mortlock Rivers. It is the largest town and regional centre in the Avon Valley region of the Central Wheatbelt. It is located approximately 97 kilometres (60 miles) north east of Perth, the capital city of Western Australia. At the time of the 2021 census, Northam had a population of 6,679.

== History ==
The area around Northam was first explored in 1830 by a party of colonists led by Ensign Robert Dale, and subsequently founded in 1833. It was named by Governor Stirling, probably after a village of the same name in Devon, England. Almost immediately it became a point of departure for explorers and settlers who were interested in the lands which lay to the east.

This initial importance declined with the growing importance of the nearby towns of York and Beverley, but the arrival of the railway made Northam the major departure point for prospectors and miners heading east towards the goldfields.

The town has had three newspapers over the years, all now defunct, namely The Northam Advertiser, Northam Courier, and the Northam News.

A number of older buildings have heritage significance and still serve the community.

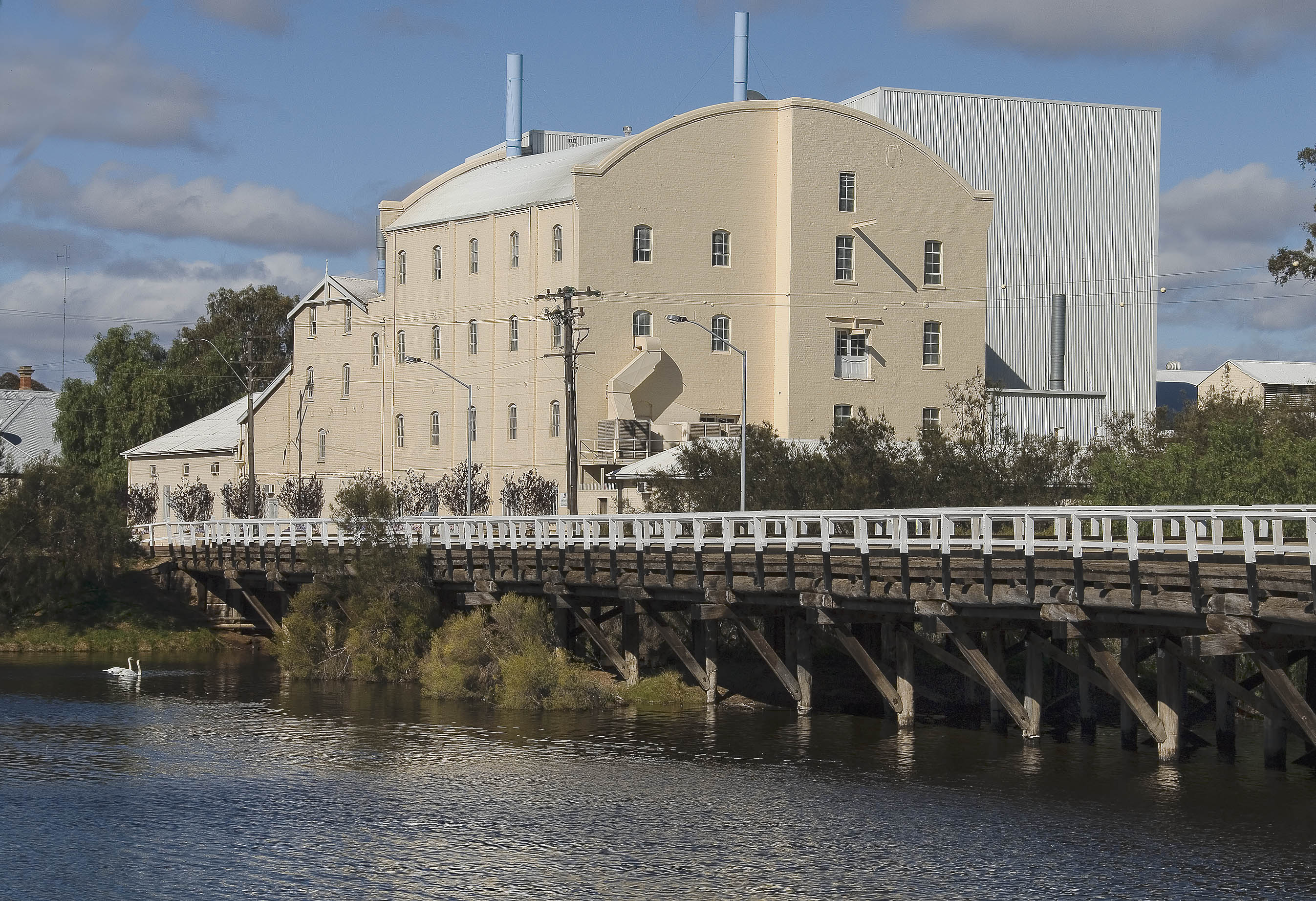
Northam Flour Mill and Avon Bridge

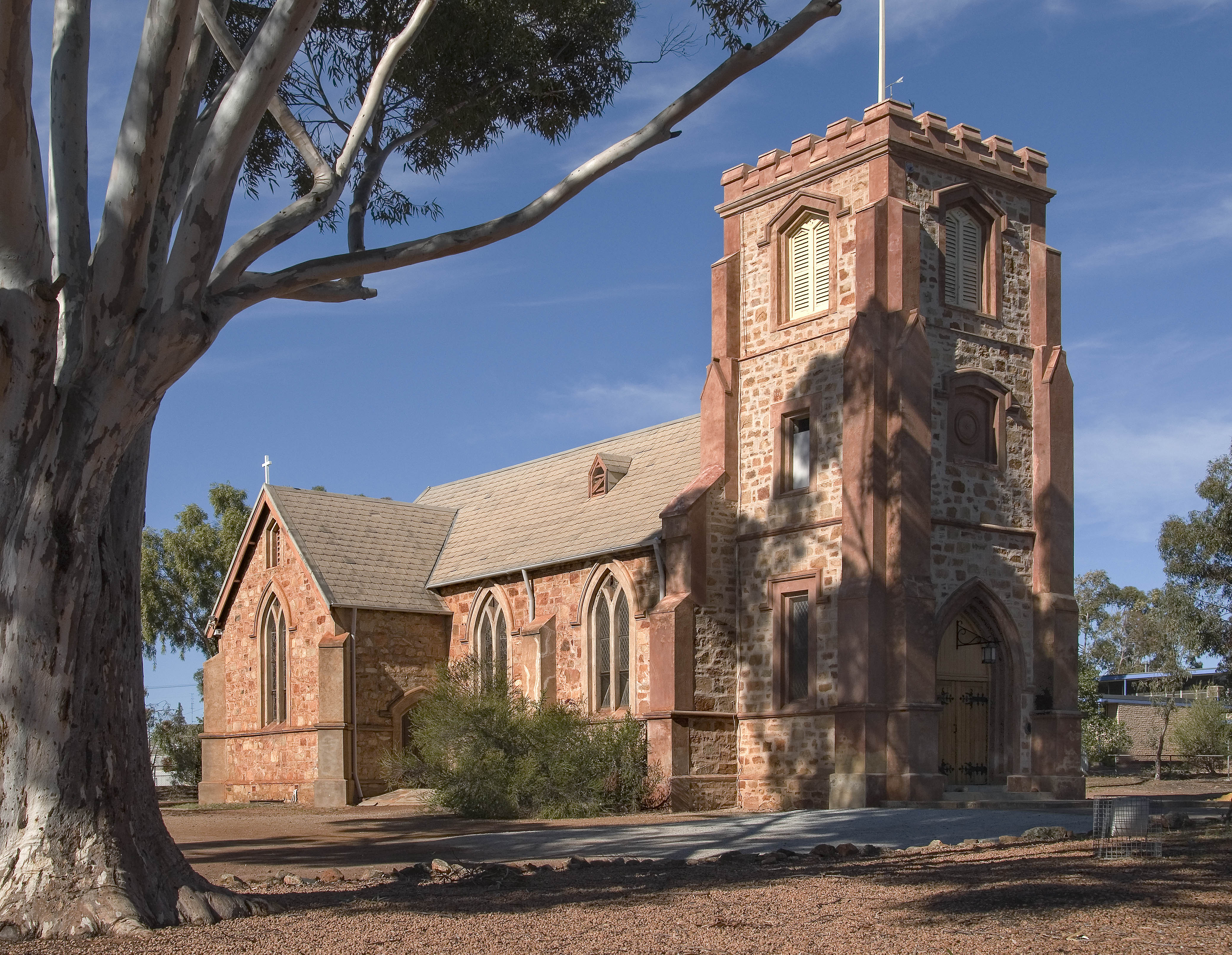
St John's Church (1890), Charles Bird arch.

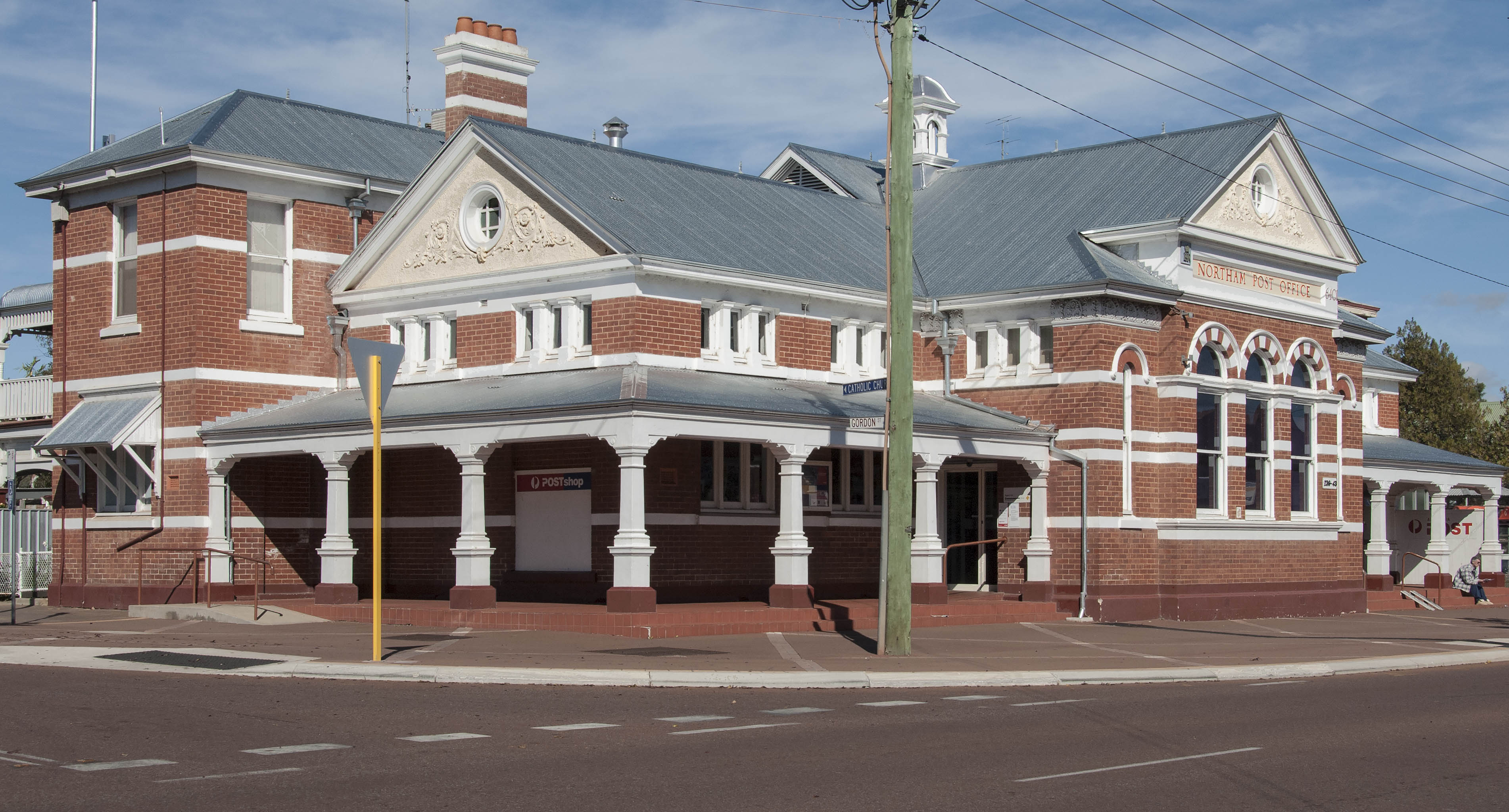
Northam Post Office (1909), Hilton Beasley arch.

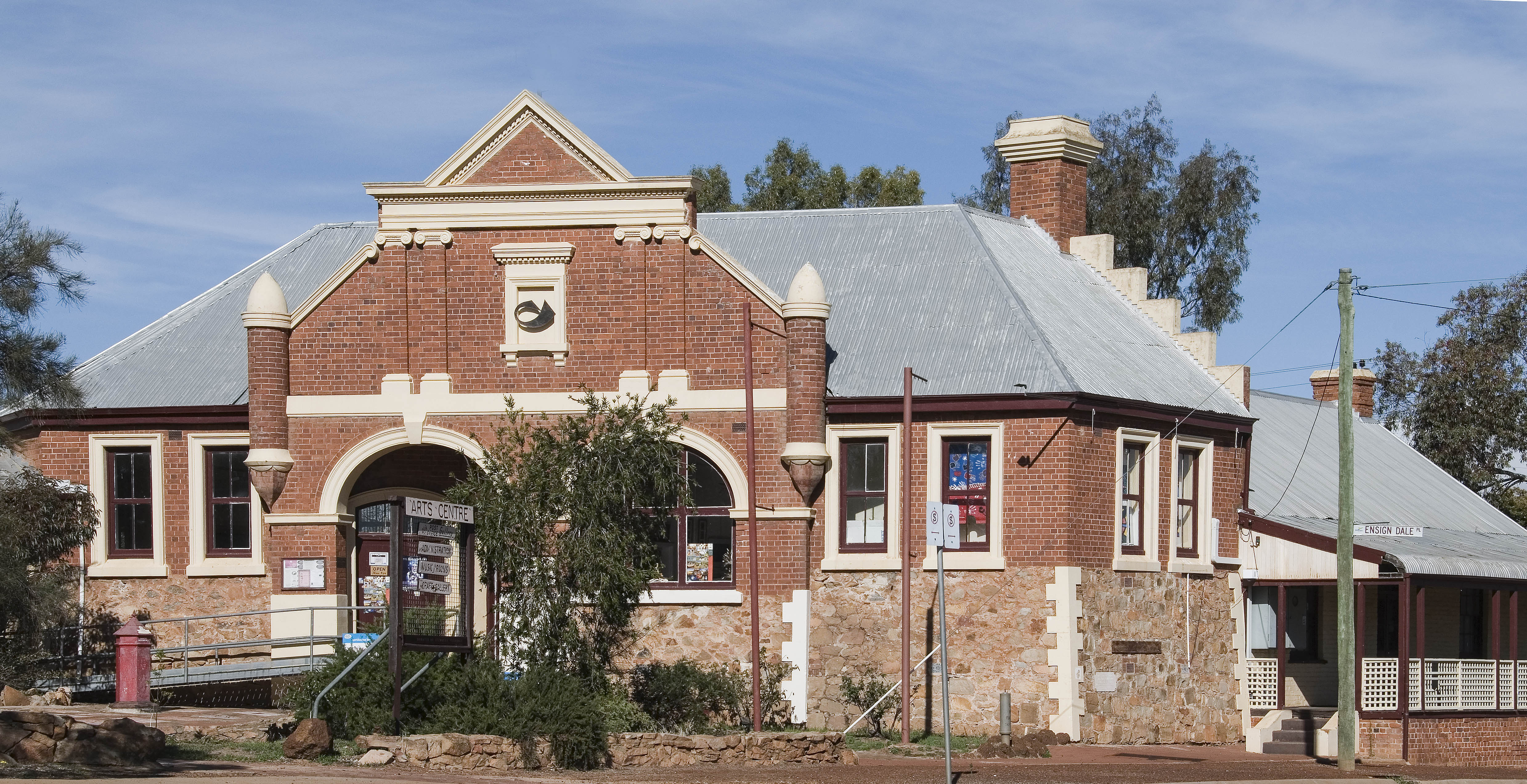
Original Northam Post Office (1873), George Temple-Poole arch.

== Camps and centres ==
=== Northam Migrant Accommodation Centre ===
During the 1940s and 1950s in Northam there were extensive camps for displaced persons and immigrants from continental Europe.

The Northam Migrant Accommodation Centre closed in September 1951. It had been the first place of residence in Western Australia for approximately 15,000 immigrants from the Baltic states, Hungary, Poland, Czechoslovakia, Italy, Yugoslavia, Ukraine, Belarus and Bulgaria. During the peak immigration period, Northam had the largest immigrant receiving facilities within the State and the third largest in Australia. By 1950, the camp housed 4,000 people and two new blocks of huts were built to accommodate them all. By May 1954, 23,000 migrants had passed through the Northam Camp once the Accommodation Centre had closed. A significant number of these post-war arrivals eventually settled in the Northam area.

=== Yongah Hill Immigration Detention Centre ===
On 18 October 2010 the Yongah Hill (YHIDC) centre was announced as being established at the former Northam Army Training Camp. It was not opened until early 2012, however, and, after it was downsized from the original 1500 expected occupancy, talk of expansion has been happening.

It is run by Serco for the Department of Home Affairs.

Australian Border Force officers are also present at the centre.

In September 2018 a riot broke out at the centre and some buildings were set on fire, after a detainee was reportedly found in his cell injured after a suicide attempt. The detainee, who was a refugee, later died.

Also in September 2018, a guard was alleged to have sexually assaulted a detainee.

== Geography ==
The town and hinterland of Northam are located in the Avon Valley - so named after the Avon River. It has periodically flooded, and man-made banks protect the town from flooding. The Avon is a name commonly used by organisations, newspapers and sporting groups.

The river is spanned by a pedestrian suspension bridge; 117 metres (384 ft) long, it is the longest such bridge in Australia.

Burlong Pool a pool just south of the town was known as the Burlong swimming pool, and in the 1890s the location of the source of water for the Goldfields water trains.

=== Climate ===
Northam has a hot-summer mediterranean climate (Köppen: Csa) with hot, dry summers and mild, rainy winters.

Climate data for Northam (31º45'S, 116º41'E, 166 m AMSL) (1902–2024 normals and extremes, sunshine 1931–1981)
Month	Jan	Feb	Mar	Apr	May	Jun	Jul	Aug	Sep	Oct	Nov	Dec	Year
Record high °C (°F)	46.3 (115.3)	48.1 (118.6)	43.9 (111.0)	39.5 (103.1)	35.2 (95.4)	27.2 (81.0)	25.2 (77.4)	29.7 (85.5)	34.7 (94.5)	40.0 (104.0)	44.1 (111.4)	45.6 (114.1)	48.1 (118.6)
Mean daily maximum °C (°F)	34.3 (93.7)	33.7 (92.7)	30.8 (87.4)	26.1 (79.0)	21.3 (70.3)	18.0 (64.4)	17.0 (62.6)	18.0 (64.4)	20.5 (68.9)	24.2 (75.6)	28.6 (83.5)	32.2 (90.0)	25.4 (77.7)
Daily mean °C (°F)	25.8 (78.4)	25.5 (77.9)	23.2 (73.8)	19.1 (66.4)	14.9 (58.8)	12.2 (54.0)	11.2 (52.2)	11.8 (53.2)	13.7 (56.7)	16.6 (61.9)	20.6 (69.1)	23.8 (74.8)	18.2 (64.8)
Mean daily minimum °C (°F)	17.2 (63.0)	17.2 (63.0)	15.5 (59.9)	12.0 (53.6)	8.4 (47.1)	6.4 (43.5)	5.4 (41.7)	5.6 (42.1)	6.9 (44.4)	9.0 (48.2)	12.5 (54.5)	15.4 (59.7)	11.0 (51.8)
Record low °C (°F)	7.3 (45.1)	7.9 (46.2)	4.9 (40.8)	0.6 (33.1)	−2.2 (28.0)	−3.9 (25.0)	−3.2 (26.2)	−1.7 (28.9)	−1.4 (29.5)	−0.3 (31.5)	2.1 (35.8)	4.5 (40.1)	−3.9 (25.0)
Average precipitation mm (inches)	11.7 (0.46)	13.8 (0.54)	19.3 (0.76)	23.1 (0.91)	54.5 (2.15)	77.6 (3.06)	81.5 (3.21)	61.3 (2.41)	37.0 (1.46)	24.5 (0.96)	12.3 (0.48)	9.0 (0.35)	424.3 (16.70)
Average precipitation days (≥ 0.2 mm)	1.9	2.1	3.1	5.5	10.4	14.2	15.9	13.8	10.7	7.1	4.0	2.3	91.1
Average afternoon relative humidity (%)	31	34	37	45	54	62	64	60	55	44	35	32	46
Average dew point °C (°F)	12.4 (54.3)	13.2 (55.8)	12.4 (54.3)	11.8 (53.2)	10.6 (51.1)	9.5 (49.1)	9.3 (48.7)	9.0 (48.2)	9.4 (48.9)	9.3 (48.7)	9.2 (48.6)	10.6 (51.1)	10.6 (51.0)
Mean monthly sunshine hours	344.1	282.5	272.8	198.0	189.1	150.0	167.4	198.4	219.0	279.0	306.0	362.7	2,969
Mean daily sunshine hours	11.1	10.0	8.8	6.6	6.1	5.0	5.4	6.4	7.3	9.0	10.2	11.7	8.1
Percentage possible sunshine	80	76	72	58	58	49	52	58	61	70	74	82	66
Source: Bureau of Meteorology (1902–2024 normals and extremes), (sunshine from Muresk Institute 1931–1981)

=== Significant weather events ===
A severe thunderstorm lashed the town and surrounding areas on 27 January 2011 resulting in roofs being ripped off, trees being uprooted and power lines being brought down. About 50 houses were damaged in the town as a result of the storm but no injuries were reported.

A flash flood occurred in the town and surrounding areas on 2 March 2021, with 40 millimetres of rainfall occurring in just half an hour. This resulted in many houses being damaged, as well as the Jubilee oval flooding, leaving silt all over the busy road of Peel Terrace.

== Government ==
Originally, the town and surrounding area was split into two municipalities, the Town of Northam handling the affairs of the town, and the Shire of Northam which also manages other towns, such as Bakers Hill and Wundowie. After 53 years of debates and failed attempts, the two councils finally merged as of 1 July 2007 to form a conglomerate council, simply known as the Shire of Northam.

The public sector is a large employer for residents of Northam and surrounding areas. The town of Northam is the main regional centre for the Central Wheatbelt region, and as such many local and state government departments operate out of the town.

Services Australia operates a Centrelink office in the town.

== Tourism ==
Northam has a number of tourist attractions, including hot air ballooning, wineries, cafes and restaurants, museums, hotels and motels.

== Transport ==
Northam railway station is served by Transwa's AvonLink, MerredinLink and Prospector rural train services. Northam is connected to Perth via coach services N3 and N5.

=== Railways ===
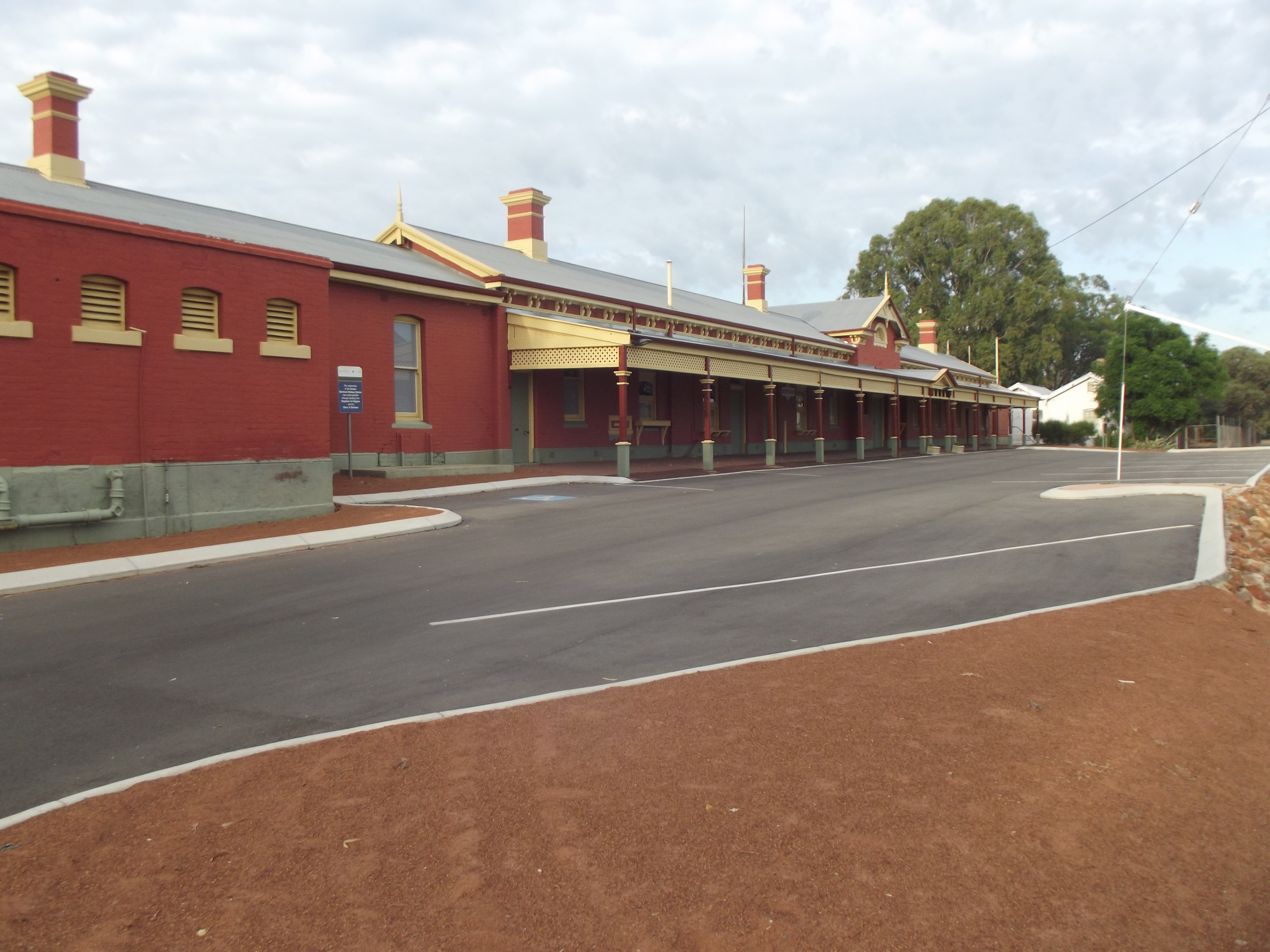
Old Northam Railway Station

Northam is a major railway junction, and serves as the commercial centre for much of the western Wheatbelt. The dual gauge Eastern Railway terminates here and becomes the standard gauge Eastern Goldfields Railway. Narrow gauge radiates both south of the town to York and beyond (Great Southern Railway), and north to Goomalling, another rural railway junction.

==== Original railway station ====
The original station on Fitzgerald Street was opened in 1900 and closed in 1966 when the new Eastern Railway route became operational.

The layout of the pre-1966 narrow gauge railway also had a busy junction at East Northam; this was removed on the completion of the new standard gauge railway.

==== Avon Yard ====
The Western Australian Government Railways originally created it as the Avon Marshalling Yard, and more recent operators in the yards such as Australian Railroad Group have named it the Avon Yard.

=== Airport and roads ===
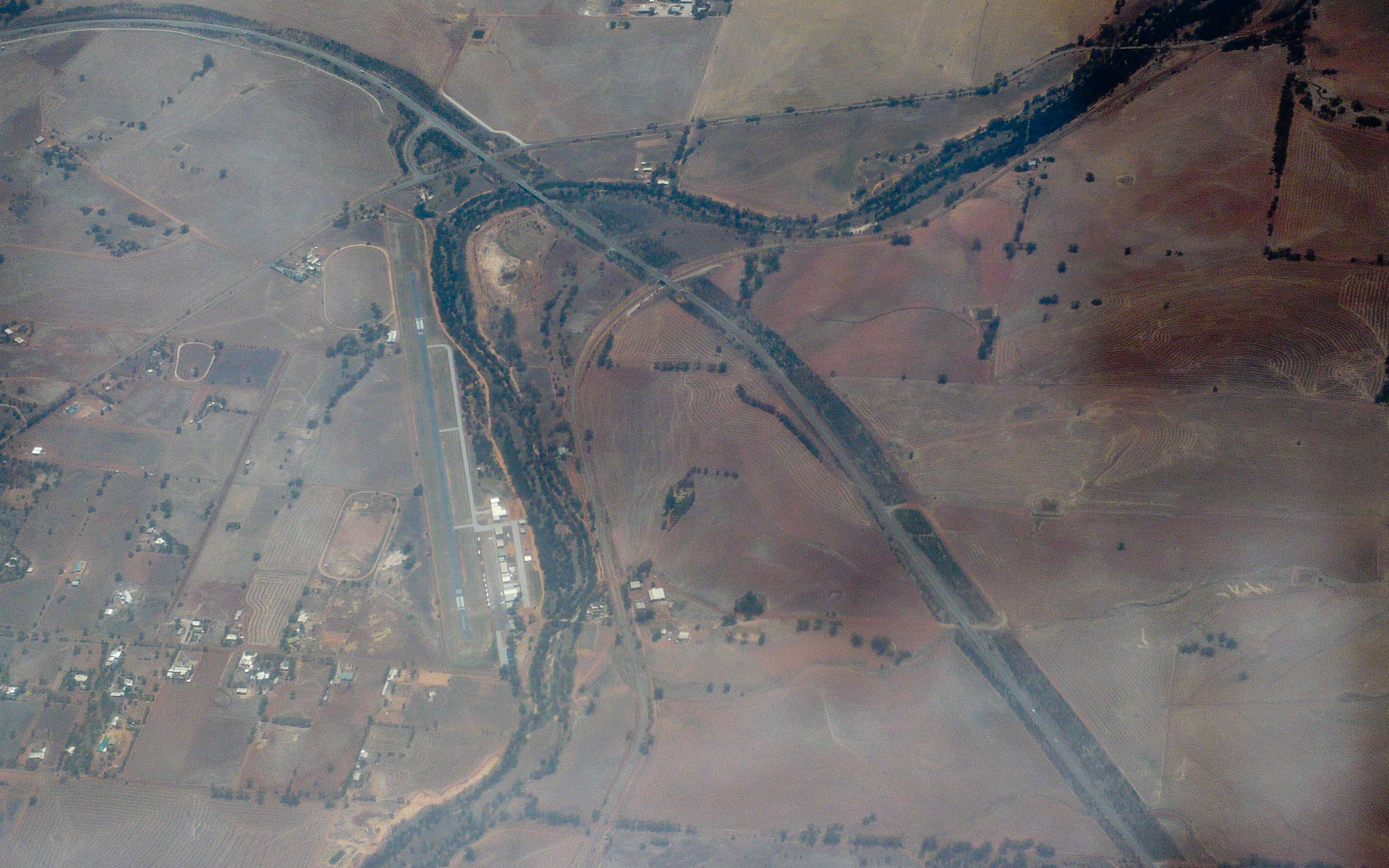
Northam airport, at the junction of Great Eastern Highway with Route 115, near the bridge over Mortlock River North

== Education ==
Northam has three public primary schools, a public high school, and a TAFE campus. It also has a private Catholic school, St Josephs which conducts classes from Kindergarten to Year 12, across two campuses.

=== Primary schools ===
The original Northam Primary School was established in 1890, making it one of the states oldest primary schools. The current school opened in 1978 replacing the original structure, it is located on Duke Street. It was the first primary school of the area and has approximately over 300 students. West Northam Primary School is located on Habgood Street and has approximately 140 students. Avon Vale Primary School opened in 1954. It is located on Hutt Street and has approximately 140 students.

=== Secondary education ===
Northam Senior High School is the public high school for the area. It is one of the oldest high schools in the state, opening in 1921. The main building is heritage listed, though the campus has had renovations and further additions added to it in 1986, 1996 and 2015 It has approximately 715 students. In Semester 2, 2020 the school became an Independent Public School. It has several specialized programs to meet the diverse needs of its students, such as the Big Picture Program, Clontarf Foundation, Wirrpanda Foundation, Deadly Sista Girlz and others. The school not only intakes students from the town of Northam, but also Year 10-12 students from the surrounding District High Schools, including the surrounding towns of Toodyay, York, Beverley, Goomalling and others. It also has a college for students that board that are from remote communities, Northam Residential College.

=== Private schools ===
Saint Josephs is a private Catholic school, with two campuses in Northam. It has approximately 600 students and teaches from Kindergarten to Year 12. The primary school campus, located on Lance Street, teaches students Kindergarten to Year 6. The high school campus, located on Wellington Street East, teaches students Year 7 to Year 12. This campus was opened in 1889 by the Sisters of Saint Joseph of the Apparition, while the Marist Brothers opened the Saint Pauls school in 1948 and 1971 before merging the schools together.

=== Tertiary education ===
Northam has a TAFE campus, previously known as the C. Y. O'Connor Institute. It has since been merged with other regional TAFEs and trades under Central Regional TAFE.

Northam is also home to the Muresk Institute, one of Western Australia's leading tertiary educators for agriculture.

== Sport ==
Association Football (Soccer) has been played in Northam since just after World War Two. Due to the many European immigrants living at the Holden Camp a league was formed comprising nine teams from Northam and one from Wundowie. Many of the teams were based on ethnicity such as: Italian; Dutch; Polish; Hungarian; Romanian; Yugoslav; Austrian; German and Bulgarian. In recent years, Northam United FC was a men's team whilst Northam Springfield FC is a children's football club in its tenth season (2021). Springfield play in the winter against their rivals Toodyay Junior Soccer Club.

Northam has some very committed sporting teams, as Australian rules football is popular in Western Australia. Northam has two teams that play in the Avon Football Association competition, Federals and Railways.

Field and indoor hockey, cricket, and netball also attract significant numbers of players and spectators. Individual sports such as tennis and cycling including BMX are also popular.

The BMX State Championships were held in Northam in 2003 with 3,000 competitors and spectators attending the event for over a week with Northam competitors showing their dominance in the sport in the state. Three local riders who participated in this event (Dale Reynolds – then ranked 3WA for 18 Men's, Chris Marris – then ranked 1WA for 18 Men's, and Kyle Martin – then ranked 4WA for 18 Men's) have subsequently completed cross country rides from Adelaide to Perth demonstrating the interest in cycling in Northam.

Steve Fossett became the first person to fly around the world alone, non-stop, in a hot air balloon when he launched from Northam on 19 June 2002, and returned to Australia on 3 July, landing in Queensland.

In July 2016 Russian adventurer and balloon pilot Fedor Konyukhov took off from Northam airfield to attempt a solo nonstop round the world balloon flight. He completed his circumnavigation, covering 33,521 kilometres (20,829 mi), in 11 days, 4 hours and 20 minutes, beating Fossett's record by 52 hours.

Between 1952 and 1956 several motor racing events were held using streets within the town. The first circuit used was on the south side of the Avon River, but this was considered too dangerous, so a new circuit was built in 1956 on the north side of the river.

Thoroughbred horse racing is held at Northam Racecourse by the Northam Race Club. The track held its first race in 1863 and has about 22 race meetings during the year.

The town is also home to harness racing and greyhound racing.

== Events ==
The town of Northam is home to several iconic Western Australian events and activities.

The Avon Descent is an annual, two-day white water river race that begins in Northam, and travels 124 km down the Avon River, into the Swan River before finishing in Bayswater. It occurs each year in August, and allows both power craft and paddle craft.

The Northam Motorsport Festival occurs annually between the months of March and April and is the spiritual successor to the historical Northam Flying 50s event. It is a free event which incorporates three activities, the Mount Ommanney Hillclimb, the SCBC Motokhana and the iconic Northam Flying 50s, an event in which the main streets of Northam are used as a circuit in which classic cars may complete time trials and race. There also is a classic car show, and several other small promotions and specials put on by community members. The show attracts around 5,000 spectators annually.

The Northam Farmer's Show is held annually on a Friday and Saturday in mid-September. It is an agricultural show similar to others held in the area, such as the York Show and the Toodyay Show.

The Kep Ultra running race is held each year on the Western Australia Day long weekend in early June. The race starts in Northam and includes 100 km and 75 km events finishing at Mundaring Weir.

== Military history ==
During World War I, Wilberforce, an area on the Spencers Brook to York Road was the area set up for the breeding and selection of horses to be transported to overseas theatres of war involving Australian horseman in particular the iconic 10th Light Horse Regiment.

Also in November 1920, an area at Noggojerrring was purchased by the Federal Government for £7,000. It was an area of 875 acres(350 hectares) of farming land and was located four miles (6.5 kilometres) north of Northam on the Northam - Pithara Road. Of that area, 860 acres (344 hectares) were cleared and divided into 11 paddocks. The property was well watered, and carried a wind mill, two dwellings, three sheds, and a stable. The Goomalling railway bisected it. The Federal Government's purpose was the settlement of tubercular soldiers. The place was christened Anzac Farm.

During World War II, Northam was the location of a number of important strategic military camps, depots and installations being the most concentrated of military activity areas in Western Australia. Due to its strategic geographical location and being close to water, the Goldfields Water Supply Scheme, close to strategic railway junction, as it was close to the coast but inland, Northam became an important military hub.

The installations, camps, and depots were some of those developed in the Wheatbelt during 1939–1945, located within the Shire of Northam, some of which still exist today.

- Northam Army Camp including the 38th Camp Hospital, training and hospital
- 6 Commonwealth Ammunition Depot (6CAD) to become 51 Supply Company, Springhill, ammunition storage
- US Navy 7 Naval Ammunition Depot (7 NAD), Springhill, torpedo storage
- RAAF No 10 Inland Aircraft Fuel Depot (RAAF 10IAFD), Burlong, aircraft fuel storage
- Muresk Agricultural College, Muresk, intelligence
- Australian Army 7th Supply Depot (7SD), Spencers Brook, food, clothing storage and distribution
- RAAF No 6 Replenishment Centre, Muresk, ammunition storage
- 118th Australian General Hospital (118 AGH), Northam, hospital, later to become 71 Camp Hospital
- Werribee Army Camp, near Wundowie, transport and anti-tank
- RAAF Meenaar, Meenaar, RAAF airstrip
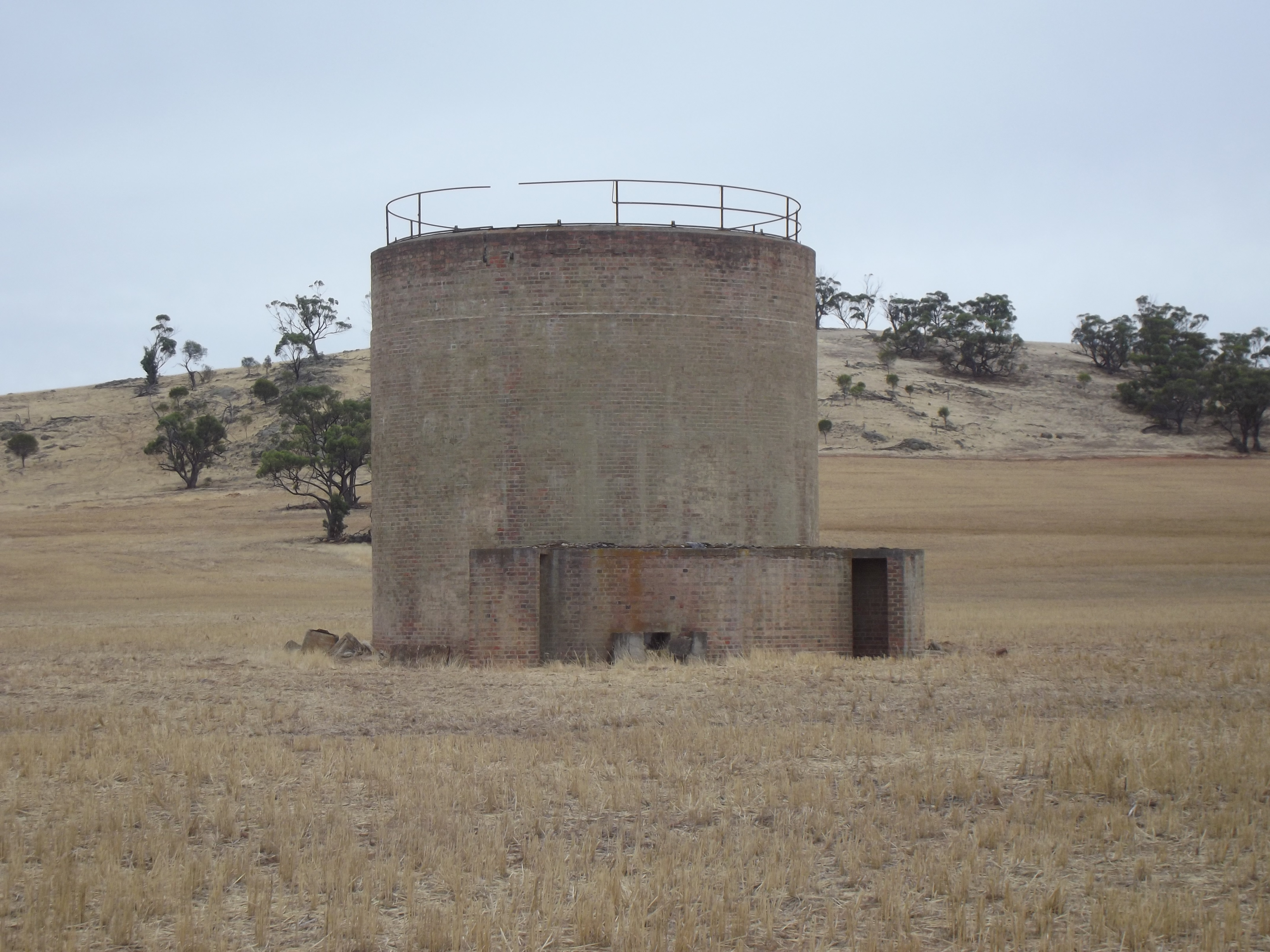
No.1 Fuel Tank of the WWII RAAF No.10 Inland Aircraft Fuel Depot, Burlong, Northam

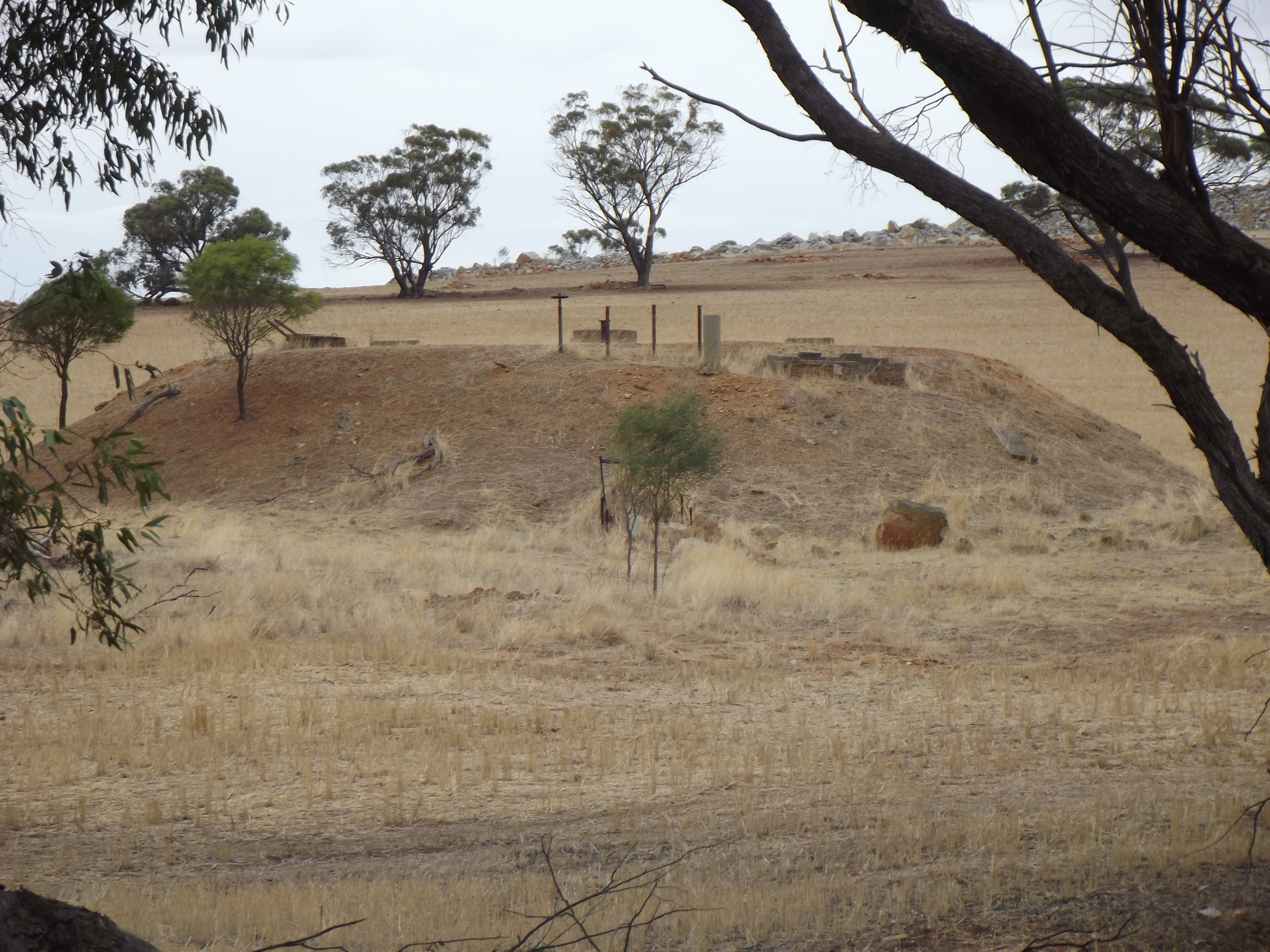
Underground tank - RAAF No.10 IAFD, Burlong, Northam

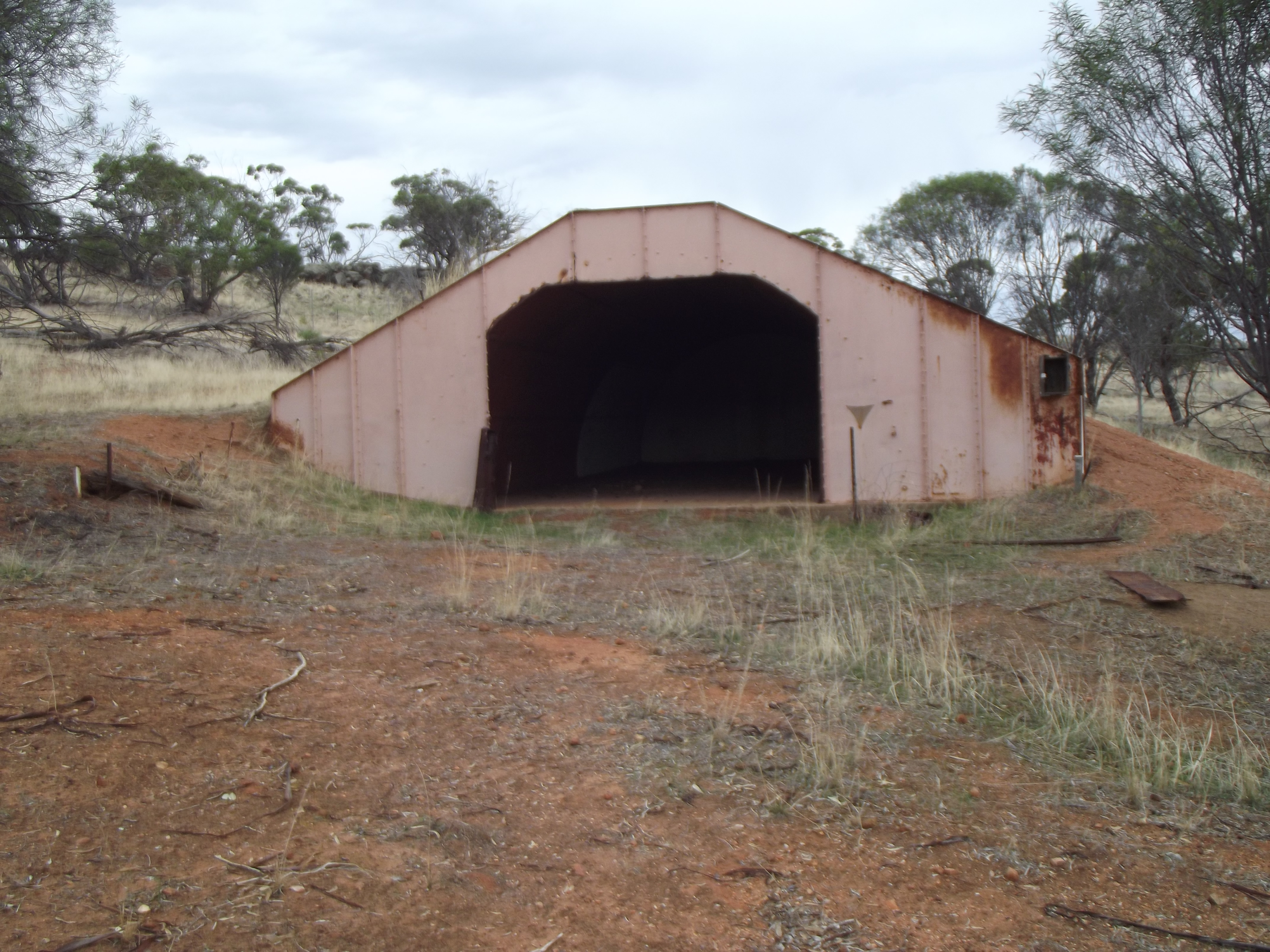
Ammunition Bunker - US Navy 7NAD, Springhill

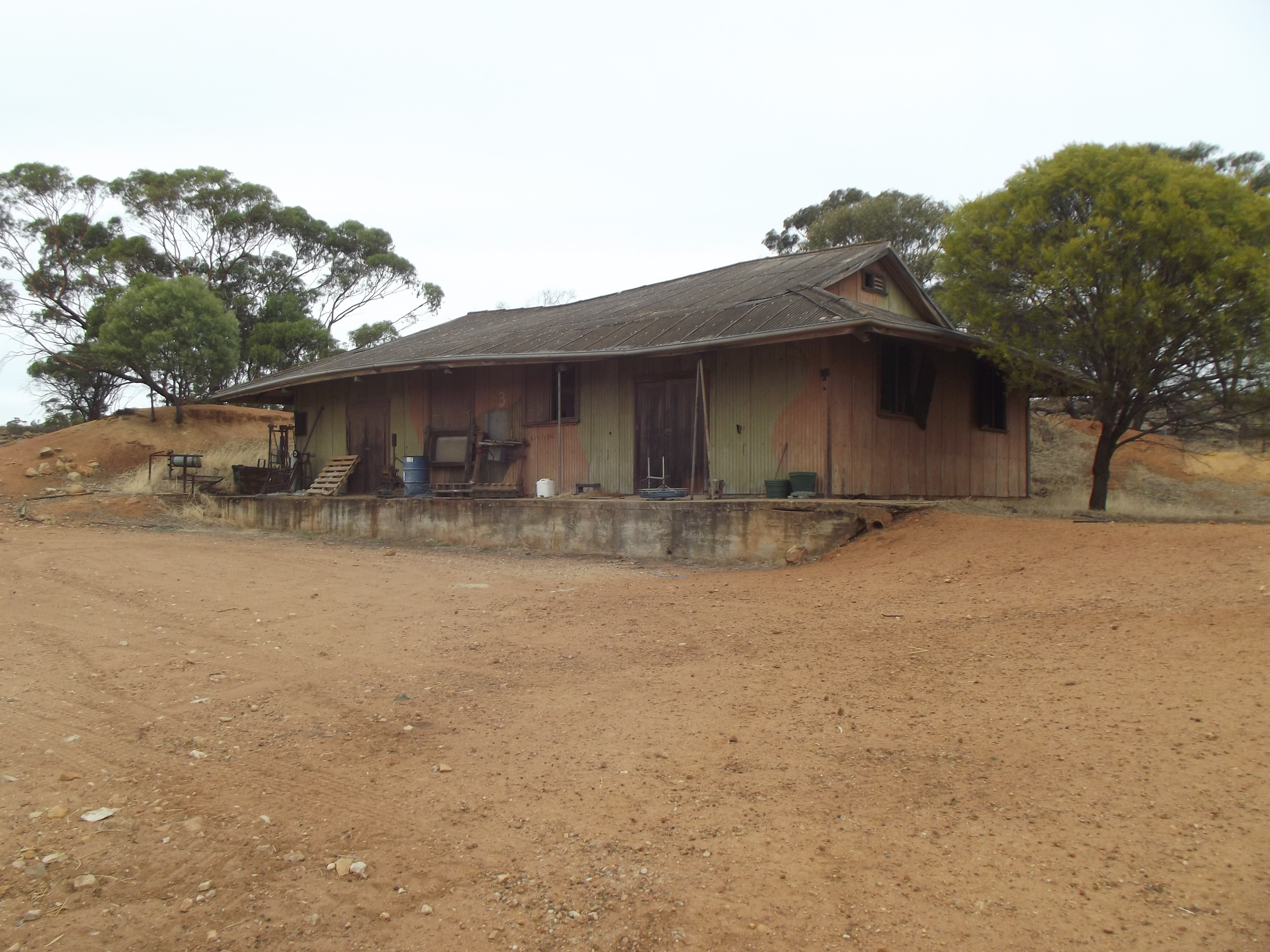
Ammunition Storage - RAAF No. 6 Replenishment Centre, Muresk

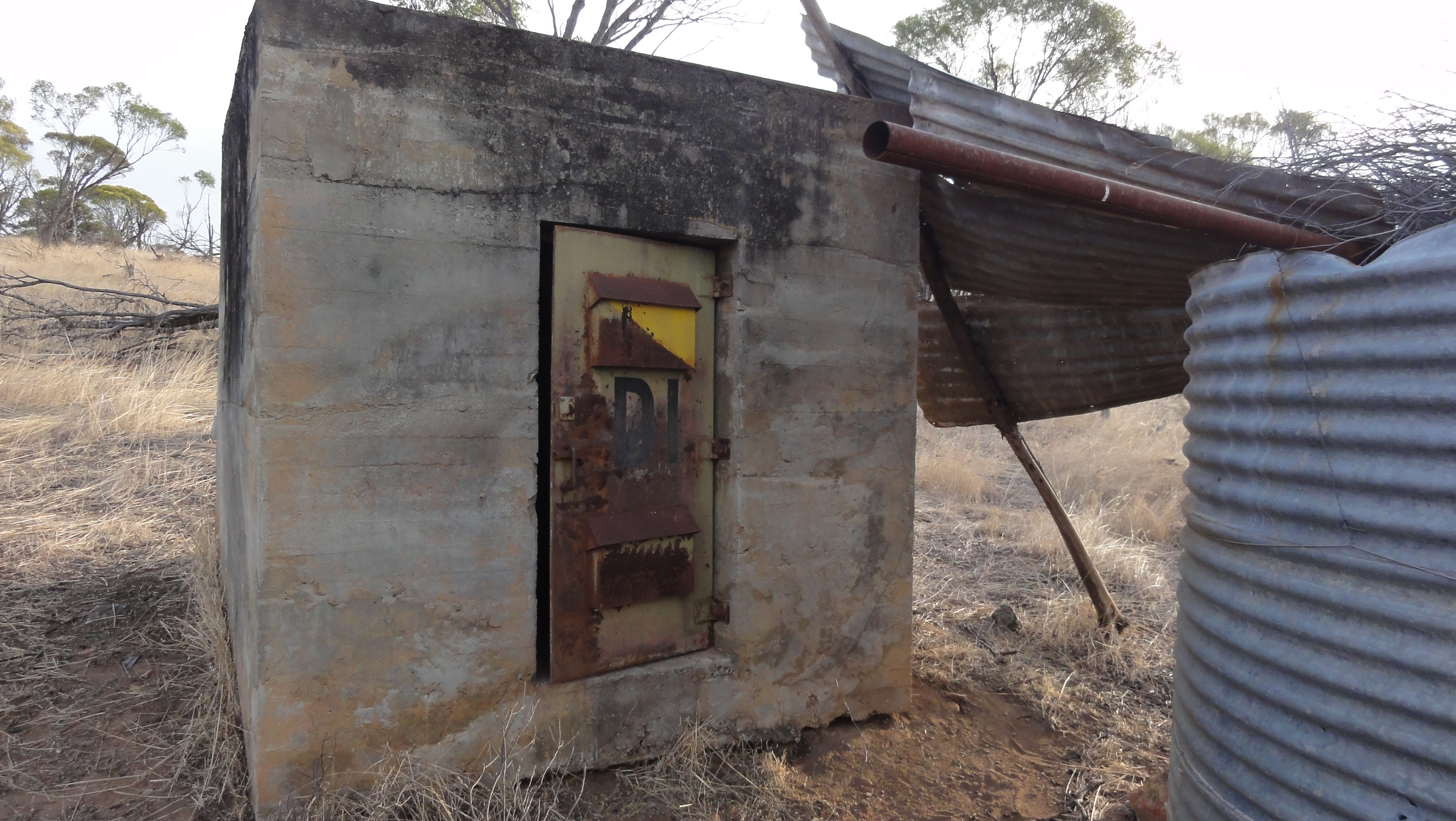
Detonator Hut - US Navy 7NAD - Springhill

== Notable people ==
Northam is the birthplace of the following people:

Politics

- Kim Edward Beazley (1917–2007), federal government minister
- Ian Laurance (born 1940), state government minister
- Carmen Lawrence (born 1948), state premier and federal government minister
- Ken McIver (1928–1988), state government minister
- Frederick Henry Piesse (1853–1912), state government minister
- Ian Pratt (born 1937), state upper-house member
- David Templeman (born 1965), state government minister

Sport

- Arnold Byfield (1923–2015), first-class cricketer, WAFL and VFL footballer
- Leon Davis (born 1981), AFL footballer
- Bruce Duperouzel (born 1950), first-class cricketer, WAFL and VFL footballer
- Cruize Garlett (born 1989), AFL footballer
- Darren Glass (born 1981), AFL footballer
- Eric Glass (1910–1985), WAFL, VFL, and VFA footballer
- Robbie Haddrill (born 1981), AFL footballer
- Bobby Hill (born 2000), AFL footballer
- Geoff Marsh (born 1958), Test cricketer
- Ashley McGrath (born 1983), AFL footballer
- Cory McGrath (born 1979), AFL footballer
- Stephen Milosz (1955–2022), first-class cricketer
- Harry Morgan (1889–1956), WAFL, VFL, and SANFL footballer
- Emma O'Driscoll (born 2000), AFLW footballer
- Nathan O'Driscoll (born 2002), AFL footballer
- Deven Robertson- (born 2001)- AFL footballer
- Alistair Smith (born 1990), AFL footballer
- Brennan Stack (born 1988), AFL footballer
- Sydney Stack (born 2000)- AFL footballer
- Jasmin Stewart (born 1998), AFLW footballer

Others

- Elizabeth Backhouse (1917–2013), novelist, scriptwriter and playwright
- Ben Carlin (1912–1981), first to circumnavigate the world in an amphibious vehicle
- Kate Leeming, explorer, ultra-distance cyclist and Australian Real Tennis champion
- Ragnar Garrett (1900–1977), Australian Army officer
- Hugo Throssell (1884–1933), Victoria Cross recipient

== See also ==
- Muresk Institute
