= List of AFL debuts in 2002 =

This is a listing of Australian rules footballers who made their senior debut for an Australian Football League (AFL) club in 2002.

== Debuts ==
Name	Club	Age at debut	Round debuted	Games (As of end of 2014)	Goals (As of end of 2014)	Notes
Graham Johncock	Adelaide	19 years, 161 days	1	227	120	
Brent Reilly	Adelaide	18 years, 243 days	15	203	52	
Martin Mattner	Adelaide	19 years, 335 days	14	98	14	
Kris Massie	Adelaide	21 years, 332 days	5	88	11	Previously played for Carlton.
Ben Nelson	Adelaide	25 years, 67 days	1	12	1	Previously played for Carlton.
Daniel Schell	Adelaide	22 years, 70 days	1	11	9	Previously played for Fremantle.
Ryan Fitzgerald	Adelaide	25 years, 166 days	1	8	8	Previously played for Sydney.
Shane Morrison	Brisbane Lions	21 years, 114 days	6	5	0	
Darren Bradshaw	Brisbane Lions	21 years, 250 days	1	1	0	Brother of Daniel Bradshaw.
Bret Thornton	Carlton	18 years, 199 days	10	188	30	
Trent Sporn	Carlton	19 years, 195 days	2	50	8	
Luke Livingston	Carlton	19 years, 168 days	4	46	2	
Corey McKernan	Carlton	28 years, 101 days	1	41	60	Previously played for the Kangaroos.
Justin Davies	Carlton	18 years, 307 days	7	41	20	
Andrew Eccles	Carlton	22 years, 337 days	6	13	2	
Callan Beasy	Carlton	20 years, 124 days	16	13	6	
Blake Campbell	Carlton	19 years, 299 days	10	11	3	
Sam Cranage	Carlton	22 years, 337 days	1	10	2	Previously played for St Kilda.
David Gallagher	Carlton	21 years, 237 days	1	7	1	Previously played for Adelaide.
Sean O'Keeffe	Carlton	20 years, 78 days	17	6	1	
Lindsay Smith	Carlton	22 years, 59 days	5	3	0	Previously played for Kangaroos.
Jason Cloke	Collingwood	19 years, 335 days	2	76	10	Son of David Cloke and brother of Travis and Cameron Cloke.
Richard Cole	Collingwood	18 years, 256 days	1	56	6	
Mark McGough	Collingwood	17 years, 302 days	4	37	12	
Scott Cummings	Collingwood	28 years, 69 days	1	5	6	Previously played for Essendon, Port Adelaide and West Coast.
Andrew Welsh	Essendon	19 years, 88 days	7	162	32	
Joel Reynolds	Essendon	17 years, 312 days	3	38	13	Grandson of Dick Reynolds.
Ted Richards	Essendon	19 years, 84 days	2	33	19	
Shane Harvey	Essendon	19 years, 121 days	6	11	9	Brother of Brent Harvey.
Sam Hunt	Essendon	19 years, 126 days	20	7	1	
James Davies	Essendon	19 years, 313 days	11	3	1	
Ken Hall	Essendon	21 years, 213 days	12	1	0	
Luke McPharlin	Fremantle	20 years, 197 days	12	238	115	Previously played for Hawthorn.
Jeff Farmer	Fremantle	24 years, 294 days	3	131	224	Previously played for Melbourne.
Roger Hayden	Fremantle	21 years, 216 days	15	128	14	
Paul Medhurst	Fremantle	20 years, 110 days	1	99	166	
Scott Thornton	Fremantle	19 years, 249 days	8	88	21	
Graham Polak	Fremantle	17 years, 288 days	1	73	9	
Troy Simmonds	Fremantle	23 years, 275 days	1	64	59	Previously played for Melbourne.
Trent Croad	Fremantle	22 years, 22 days	1	38	60	Previously played for Hawthorn.
Andrew Siegert	Fremantle	20 years, 72 days	1	36	5	
Andrew Browne	Fremantle	18 years, 4 days	8	29	6	
Daniel Haines	Fremantle	21 years, 23 days	6	16	4	
Gary Ablett	Geelong	17 years, 320 days	1	192	262	2009 Brownlow Medallist. Son of Gary Ablett Sr. and brother of Nathan Ablett.
Jimmy Bartel	Geelong	18 years, 116 days	1	272	191	2007 Brownlow Medallist
James Kelly	Geelong	18 years, 126 days	6	256	87	
Steve Johnson	Geelong	18 years, 304 days	6	233	422	
Max Rooke	Geelong	20 years, 108 days	2	135	58	
David Johnson	Geelong	20 years, 153 days	7	79	16	Brother of Mark Johnson.
Charlie Gardiner	Geelong	19 years, 100 days	11	51	25	
Paul Chambers	Geelong	19 years, 302 days	4	32	5	
Will Slade	Geelong	18 years, 291 days	19	17	2	
Brent Grgic	Geelong	22 years, 173 days	1	13	3	Previously played for Melbourne.
Sam Mitchell	Hawthorn	19 years, 197 days	5	261	61	
Luke Hodge	Hawthorn	17 years, 316 days	5	250	167	
Campbell Brown	Hawthorn	18 years, 284 days	11	159	64	
Robert Campbell	Hawthorn	19 years, 329 days	5	116	25	
Mark Williams	Hawthorn	18 years, 353 days	1	111	242	
Nick Ries	Hawthorn	19 years, 280 days	4	81	18	
Simon Cox	Hawthorn	25 years, 72 days	2	35	17	Previously played for the Western Bulldogs.
Nick Stone	Hawthorn	20 years, 188 days	2	17	0	
David Loats	Hawthorn	21 years, 121 days	12	11	3	
Brad Miller	Melbourne	18 years, 316 days	8	133	89	
Clint Bizzell	Melbourne	25 years, 277 days	1	88	7	Previously played for Geelong.
Steven Armstrong	Melbourne	18 years, 79 days	1	43	21	
Peter Vardy	Melbourne	26 years, 71 days	2	41	56	Previously played for Adelaide.
Craig Ellis	Melbourne	26 years, 320 days	4	15	1	Previously played for Western Bulldogs.
Michael Clark	Melbourne	21 years, 47 days	22	1	1	
Mark Porter	Kangaroos	25 years, 170 days	1	55	7	Previously played for Carlton.
John Baird	Kangaroos	21 years, 292 days	1	46	7	
Ben Robbins	Kangaroos	25 years, 93 days	1	40	7	Previously played for Brisbane.
Domenic Cassisi	Port Adelaide	19 years, 287 days	14	225	774	
Shaun Burgoyne	Port Adelaide	19 years, 175 days	3	157	171	Brother of Peter Burgoyne.
Damien Hardwick	Port Adelaide	29 years, 232 days	2	54	1	Previously played for Essendon.
Jaxon Crabb	Port Adelaide	22 years, 269 days	18	4	0	Previously played for West Coast.
Adam Morgan	Port Adelaide	20 years, 259 days	15	3	0	
Allan Murray	Port Adelaide	20 years, 82 days	19	1	0	Brother of Derek Murray.
Chris Newman	Richmond	20 years, 7 days	9	249	44	
Chris Hyde	Richmond	19 years, 330 days	14	93	39	
Greg Stafford	Richmond	27 years, 213 days	1	74	83	Previously played for Sydney.
David Rodan	Richmond	18 years, 171 days	1	65	43	
Adam Houlihan	Richmond	23 years, 356 days	1	33	24	Previously played for Geelong.
Craig Ednie	Richmond	20 years, 78 days	6	7	3	
Paul Hudson	Richmond	31 years, 281 days	5	3	1	Son of Peter Hudson. Previously played for Hawthorn and the Western Bulldogs.
Nick Dal Santo	St Kilda	18 years, 58 days	4	260	140	
Leigh Montagna	St Kilda	18 years, 182 days	6	232	138	
Xavier Clarke	St Kilda	18 years, 198 days	3	105	49	Brother of Raphael Clarke.
Matt Maguire	St Kilda	17 years, 338 days	6	99	19	
Heath Black	St Kilda	22 years, 306 days	1	54	19	Previously played for Fremantle.
Trent Knobel	St Kilda	21 years, 311 days	1	41	8	Previously played for Brisbane.
Barry Hall	Sydney	25 years, 51 days	1	162	467	Previously played for St Kilda.
Luke Ablett	Sydney	19 years, 220 days	13	133	39	Son of Kevin Ablett.
Amon Buchanan	Sydney	19 years, 241 days	11	116	57	
Scott Stevens	Sydney	20 years, 75 days	1	25	17	
Ricky Mott	Sydney	20 years, 344 days	1	17	3	
Leigh Brockman	Sydney	23 years, 264 days	10	10	0	Previously played for Geelong.
Jarrad Sundqvist	Sydney	19 years, 256 days	21	9	1	
Nick Daffy	Sydney	28 years, 330 days	2	1	1	Previously played for Richmond.
Quinten Lynch	West Coast	19 years, 142 days	12	209	281	
Chris Judd	West Coast	18 years, 210 days	2	134	138	2004 and 2010 Brownlow Medallist.
Ashley Sampi	West Coast	18 years, 166 days	14	78	97	
Andrew McDougall	West Coast	19 years, 64 days	22	38	48	
Brent Tuckey	West Coast	22 years, 216 days	1	3	1	Previously played for Collingwood.
Ryan Hargrave	Western Bulldogs	20 years, 248 days	1	203	37	
Brian Lake	Western Bulldogs	20 years, 178 days	21	197	32	
Daniel Cross	Western Bulldogs	19 years, 63 days	10	210	33	
Sam Power	Western Bulldogs	19 years, 26 days	17	84	16	
Shane Birss	Western Bulldogs	19 years, 26 days	2	51	20	
Daniel Bandy	Western Bulldogs	26 years, 133 days	1	45	46	Previously played for Fremantle.
Kieran McGuinness	Western Bulldogs	18 years, 363 days	14	26	7	
Nathan Saunders	Western Bulldogs	25 years, 286 days	6	10	11	
Aaron James	Western Bulldogs	25 years, 151 days	6	1	0	Previously played for Collingwood and Richmond.
