= List of AFL debuts in 2001 =

This is a listing of Australian rules footballers who made their senior debut for an Australian Football League (AFL) club in 2001.

== Debuts ==
Name	Club	Age at debut	Round debuted	Games	Goals	Notes
Matthew Bode	Adelaide	21 years, 282 days	2	79	71	Previously played for Port Adelaide.
Chris Ladhams	Adelaide	20 years, 162 days	1	54	37	
Hayden Skipworth	Adelaide	18 years, 35 days	1	44	22	
James Gallagher	Adelaide	21 years, 210 days	12	38	11	
Evan Hewitt	Adelaide	22 years, 268 days	11	15	6	Previously played for North Melbourne.
Matthew Shir	Adelaide	19 years, 210 days	1	11	1	
Stuart Bown	Adelaide	22 years, 255 days	6	4	1	
Adam Richardson	Adelaide	26 years, 265 days	7	2	1	
Ashley McGrath	Brisbane Lions	18 years, 91 days	20	188	146	Brother of Cory and Toby McGrath.
Robert Copeland	Brisbane Lions	20 years, 0 days	9	143	39	
Mal Michael	Brisbane Lions	23 years, 280 days	1	140	5	Previously played for Collingwood.
Jamie Charman	Brisbane Lions	18 years, 287 days	5	129	55	
Martin Pike	Brisbane Lions	28 years, 137 days	1	106	67	Previously played for Melbourne, Fitzroy and North Melbourne Football Clubs.
Dylan McLaren	Brisbane Lions	19 years, 103 days	20	46	6	
Richard Hadley	Brisbane Lions	18 years, 16 days	3	41	10	
Simon Wiggins	Carlton	18 years, 229 days	5	116	36	Brother of Patrick Wiggins.
Ian Prendergast	Carlton	20 years, 330 days	17	65	14	Brother of Julie Corletto.
Jim Plunkett	Carlton	22 years, 276 days	5	37	14	Previously played for Western Bulldogs.
Jordan Doering	Carlton	21 years, 226 days	5	18	11	
Adam Pickering	Carlton	20 years, 115 days	19	7	1	
Alan Didak	Collingwood	18 years, 87 days	7	213	271	
Shane Wakelin	Collingwood	27 years, 55 days	1	158	1	Previously played for St Kilda. Twin brother of Darryl Wakelin.
James Clement	Collingwood	24 years, 222 days	3	146	13	Previously played for Fremantle.
Ryan Lonie	Collingwood	18 years, 27 days	1	123	61	Twin brother of Nathan Lonie.
Brodie Holland	Collingwood	21 years, 94 days	2	119	104	Previously played for Fremantle.
Jarrod Molloy	Collingwood	24 years, 323 days	1	49	42	Previously played for Fitzroy and Brisbane. Son of Shane Molloy.
Carl Steinfort	Collingwood	23 years, 364 days	1	27	7	Previously played for Geelong.
Chad Rintoul	Collingwood	26 years, 243 days	1	14	5	Previously played for Adelaide and West Coast.
Danny Roach	Collingwood	19 years, 104 days	4	1	0	
Andrew Hill	Collingwood	21 years, 34 days	15	1	0	
David Hille	Essendon	19 years, 352 days	8	193	152	
Damien Peverill	Essendon	21 years, 282 days	4	144	32	
Marcus Bullen	Essendon	18 years, 331 days	11	44	9	
Robert Forster-Knight	Essendon	19 years, 14 days	4	31	0	
Cory McGrath	Essendon	22 years, 111 days	9	28	14	Brother of Ashley and Toby McGrath.
Jordan Bannister	Essendon	18 years, 227 days	12	14	0	
Matthew Carr	Fremantle	22 years, 92 days	1	134	64	Brother of Josh Carr. Previously played for St Kilda.
Adam McPhee	Fremantle	18 years, 233 days	14	60	27	
Dion Woods	Fremantle	19 years, 65 days	1	59	7	
Robert Haddrill	Fremantle	20 years, 167 days	15	58	0	
Simon Eastaugh	Fremantle	27 years, 363 days	11	12	1	Previously played for Essendon.
Daniel Metropolis	Fremantle	29 years, 21 days	2	6	2	Previously played for West Coast.
Keren Ugle	Fremantle	22 years, 14 days	16	4	2	
Dwayne Simpson	Fremantle	20 years, 188 days	20	2	1	
Corey Enright	Geelong	19 years, 206 days	2	244	53	
Josh Hunt	Geelong	19 years, 67 days	8	186	26	
Kent Kingsley	Geelong	22 years, 229 days	7	110	227	Previously played for North Melbourne.
Mitchell White	Geelong	28 years, 4 days	1	23	21	Previously played for West Coast.
Justin Murphy	Geelong	24 years, 342 days	1	18	9	Previously played for Richmond and Carlton.
Peter Street	Geelong	20 years, 306 days	2	17	3	
Michael Osborne	Hawthorn	19 years, 28 days	21	156	104	
Tim Clarke	Hawthorn	18 years, 363 days	1	96	39	
Nathan Lonie	Hawthorn	18 years, 97 days	11	64	35	Twin brother of Ryan Lonie.
Steven Greene	Hawthorn	19 years, 80 days	3	42	11	Son of Russell Greene.
Shaun Rehn	Hawthorn	29 years, 226 days	1	33	7	Previously played for Adelaide.
Matthew Dent	Hawthorn	29 years, 101 days	5	8	0	Previously played for Fitzroy and the Western Bulldogs.
Bill Nicholls	Hawthorn	20 years, 158 days	11	6	5	
Tim Hazell	Hawthorn	20 years, 24 days	14	5	3	
Drew Petrie	Kangaroos	18 years, 166 days	1	222	261	
Corey Jones	Kangaroos	20 years, 55 days	4	157	216	
Daniel Harris	Kangaroos	18 years, 324 days	1	149	44	
Jess Sinclair	Kangaroos	22 years, 216 days	1	142	45	Previously played for Fremantle.
Leigh Harding	Kangaroos	20 years, 93 days	17	141	157	
Saverio Rocca	Kangaroos	27 years, 130 days	1	101	234	Brother of Anthony Rocca. Previously played for Collingwood. Now plays American Football.
Daniel Motlop	Kangaroos	19 years, 161 days	21	47	53	Brother of Shannon and Steven Motlop and cousin of Marlon Motlop.
Digby Morrell	Kangaroos	21 years, 206 days	6	40	47	
David Teague	Kangaroos	20 years, 56 days	13	33	4	
Joe McLaren	Kangaroos	23 years, 144 days	6	12	6	Previously played for St Kilda.
Dylan Smith	Kangaroos	18 years, 255 days	1	11	1	
Ricky Olarenshaw	Kangaroos	28 years, 86 days	5	1	0	Previously played for Essendon and Collingwood.
Lindsay Smith	Kangaroos	21 years, 80 days	8	1	1	
Mark Hilton	Kangaroos	21 years, 249 days	8	1	0	
Darren Jolly	Melbourne	19 years,152 days	2	48	11	
Troy Broadbridge	Melbourne	20 years, 227 days	8	40	2	Killed in the 2004 Indian Ocean earthquake and tsunami. Husband of Trisha Silvers and son of Wayne Broadbridge.
Scott Thompson	Melbourne	18 years, 80 days	10	39	17	
Ross Funcke	Melbourne	23 years, 136 days	1	13	4	Previously played for Richmond.
Kane Cornes	Port Adelaide	18 years, 148 days	10	245	86	Son of Graham Cornes and brother of Chad Cornes.
Dean Brogan	Port Adelaide	22 years, 164 days	9	174	50	
Darryl Wakelin	Port Adelaide	26 years, 232 days	1	146	4	Twin brother of Shane Wakelin. Previously played for St Kilda.
Cain Ackland	Port Adelaide	19 years, 15 days	1	12	3	
Kayne Pettifer	Richmond	19 years, 152 days	12	113	132	
Andrew Krakouer	Richmond	18 years, 97 days	7	102	102	Son of Jimmy Krakouer and nephew of Phil and Andrew L. Krakouer.
Mark Coughlan	Richmond	19 years, 37 days	9	92	39	
Steven Sziller	Richmond	28 years, 107 days	1	38	3	Previously played for St Kilda.
Stephen Milne	St Kilda	21 years, 44 days	4	258	546	
Nick Riewoldt	St Kilda	18 years, 269 days	15	238	520	Cousin of Jack Riewoldt.
Justin Koschitzke	St Kilda	18 years, 207 days	3	195	243	
Fraser Gehrig	St Kilda	25 years, 36 days	2	145	390	Previously played for West Coast.
Brett Voss	St Kilda	23 years, 37 days	1	135	56	Brother of Michael Voss. Previously played for Brisbane.
Aaron Hamill	St Kilda	23 years, 223 days	1	98	125	Previously played for Carlton.
Steven Lawrence	St Kilda	24 years, 331 days	3	39	17	Son of Barry Lawrence. Previously played for Brisbane.
Daniel Wulf	St Kilda	21 years, 49 days	14	30	17	
Craig Callaghan	St Kilda	25 years, 22 days	1	29	25	Previously played for Fremantle.
Matthew Capuano	St Kilda	25 years, 210 days	1	25	13	Previously played for North Melbourne.
Mark Gale	St Kilda	24 years, 328 days	1	13	3	Previously played for Fremantle.
Robert Powell	St Kilda	24 years, 11 days	1	10	7	Previously played for Richmond.
Chris Oliver	St Kilda	19 years, 4 days	15	10	1	
Tadhg Kennelly	Sydney	20 years, 7 days	14	197	30	
Paul Williams	Sydney	27 years, 363 days	1	117	84	Previously played for Collingwood.
Brent Piltz	Sydney	22 years, 272 days	19	1	0	
Dean Cox	West Coast	19 years, 250 days	2	251	148	
Daniel Kerr	West Coast	17 years, 320 days	1	210	118	
Michael Collica	West Coast	23 years, 266 days	1	50	2	Previously played for Hawthorn.
Trent Carroll	West Coast	22 years, 338 days	1	45	6	Brother of Nathan Carroll. Previously played for Fremantle.
Troy Wilson	West Coast	29 years, 72 days	1	37	83	
Richard Taylor	West Coast	27 years, 261 days	1	28	11	Previously played for Hawthorn.
Travis Gaspar	West Coast	20 years, 52 days	8	28	15	Brother of Damien and Darren Gaspar.
Mark Merenda	West Coast	25 years, 154 days	1	26	26	Previously played for Richmond.
Jeremy Humm	West Coast	18 years, 155 days	11	22	1	
David Sierakowski	West Coast	20 years, 93 days	1	10	3	Son of Brian Sierakowski. Previously played for St Kilda.
Michael Prior	West Coast	27 years, 207 days	1	9	1	Previously played for Essendon.
Greg Harding	West Coast	24 years, 222 days	5	9	0	Previously played for Fremantle.
Daniel Giansiracusa	Western Bulldogs	19 years, 90 days	11	230	280	
Lindsay Gilbee	Western Bulldogs	19 years, 280 days	3	206	119	
Jordan McMahon	Western Bulldogs	17 years, 343 days	6	114	37	
Ben Harrison	Western Bulldogs	26 years, 73 days	1	85	32	Previously played for Carlton and Richmond.
Patrick Bowden	Western Bulldogs	19 years, 357 days	17	50	55	Son of Michael Bowden and brother of Sean and Joel Bowden.
