= 2000 AFL draft =

Draft for the Australian Football League

The 2000 AFL draft was the annual draft of talented Australian rules football players by teams that participate in the Australian Football League. It consisted of a pre-season draft, a national draft, a trade period and a rookie elevation.

In 2000 there were 87 picks to be drafted between 16 teams in the national draft. The St Kilda Football Club received the first pick in the national draft after finishing on the bottom of the ladder during the 2000 AFL season.

== Trades ==
In alphabetical order of new clubs

Player	Original Club	New club	Traded for
Matthew Bode	Port Adelaide	Adelaide Crows	draft pick #12
Evan Hewitt	Kangaroos	Adelaide Crows	draft pick #23
Mal Michael	Collingwood	Brisbane Lions	Jarrod Molloy and draft pick #44
Sam Cranage	St Kilda	Carlton	Aaron Hamill
James Clement	Fremantle	Collingwood	draft pick #8, #39
Brodie Holland	Fremantle	Collingwood	draft pick #8, #39
Jarrod Molloy	Brisbane Lions	Collingwood	Mal Michael and draft pick #22
Carl Steinfort	Geelong	Collingwood	draft pick #44
Peter Bell	Kangaroos	Fremantle	Jess Sinclair, draft picks #6, #37
Matthew Carr	St Kilda	Fremantle	Craig Callaghan
Daniel Metropolis	West Coast Eagles	Fremantle	Greg Harding
Dwayne Simpson	Sydney Swans	Fremantle	draft pick #52
Kent Kingsley + draft pick #45	Kangaroos	Geelong	draft pick #42
Justin Murphy	Carlton	Geelong	draft pick #11
Mitchell White	West Coast Eagles	Geelong	draft picks #27, #45, #57
Shaun Rehn	Adelaide Crows	Hawthorn	draft pick #12
Joe McLaren	St Kilda	Kangaroos	Matthew Capuano
Ricky Olarenshaw	Collingwood	Kangaroos	draft pick #37
Jess Sinclair	Fremantle	Kangaroos	Peter Bell
Darryl Wakelin	St Kilda	Port Adelaide	draft pick #4
Craig Callaghan	Fremantle	St Kilda	Matthew Carr
Matthew Capuano	Kangaroos	St Kilda	Joe McLaren
Fraser Gehrig	West Coast Eagles	St Kilda	David Sierakowski. draft pick #18
Aaron Hamill	Carlton	St Kilda	Sam Cranage, draft pick #4
Steven Lawrence	Brisbane Lions	St Kilda	draft pick #33
Paul Williams	Collingwood	Sydney Swans	draft pick #8, #39
Michael Collica	Hawthorn	West Coast Eagles	draft pick #21
Greg Harding	Fremantle	West Coast Eagles	Daniel Metropolis, draft pick #51
Mark Merenda	Richmond	West Coast Eagles	draft pick #57
Michael Prior	Essendon	West Coast Eagles	draft pick #27
David Sierakowski	St Kilda	West Coast Eagles	Fraser Gehrig
Richard Taylor	Hawthorn	West Coast Eagles	draft pick #21
Ben Harrison	Richmond	Western Bulldogs	draft pick #41

== 2000 national draft ==
*	Denotes player who has been a premiership player and been selected for at least one All-Australian team
^{+}	Denotes player who has been a premiership player at least once
^{x}	Denotes player who has been selected for at least one All-Australian team
^{~}	Denotes player who has been selected as Rising Star

Round	Pick	Player	Recruited from	Recruited to
Priority	1	Nick Riewoldt	Southport Sharks	St Kilda
1	2	Justin Koschitzke	Murray Bushrangers	St Kilda
1	3	Alan Didak	Port Adelaide Magpies	Collingwood
1	4	Luke Livingston	Bendigo Pioneers	Carlton
1	5	Andrew McDougall	Perth Football Club	West Coast
1	6	Dylan Smith	Sandringham Dragons	Kangaroos
1	7	Laurence Angwin	Dandenong Stingrays	Adelaide
1	8	Daniel Motlop	North Adelaide Roosters	Kangaroos
1	9	Kayne Pettifer	Murray Bushrangers	Richmond
1	10	Jordan McMahon	Glenelg	Western Bulldogs
1	11	Trent Sporn	North Adelaide Roosters	Carlton
1	12	Shaun Burgoyne	Port Adelaide Magpies	Port Adelaide
1	13	Ashley McGrath	South Fremantle Football Club	Brisbane Lions
1	14	Daniel Harris	Bendigo Bombers	Kangaroos
1	15	Simon Wiggins	Tasmanian Devils Football Club/Glenorchy Football Club	Carlton
1	16	Scott Thompson	Port Adelaide Magpies	Melbourne
1	17	James Davies	Xavier College	Essendon
2	18	Daniel Kerr	East Fremantle Football Club	West Coast Eagles
2 (F/S)	19	Jason Cloke	Eastern Ranges	Collingwood
2	20	Kane Cornes	Glenelg Football Club	Port Adelaide
2	21	Nick Ries	Sandringham Dragons	Hawthorn
2	22	Richard Hadley	East Fremantle Football Club	Brisbane Lions
2	23	Drew Petrie	North Ballarat Rebels	Kangaroos
2	24	Luke Ablett	Gippsland Power	Sydney Swans
2	25	Mark Coughlan	Perth Football Club	Richmond
2	26	Shane Birss	Gippsland Power	Western Bulldogs
2	27	Ted Richards	Sandringham Dragons	Essendon
2 (F/S)	28	Steven Greene	Sandringham Dragons	Hawthorn
2	29	Jamie Charman	Northern Eagles	Brisbane Lions
2	30	Saverio Rocca	Collingwood	Kangaroos
2	31	Blake Campbell	Murray Bushrangers	Carlton
2	32	Sam Hunt	Geelong Falcons	Essendon
3	33	Martin Pike	Kangaroos	Brisbane Lions
3	34	Ryan Lonie	Dandenong Stingrays	Collingwood
3	35	Allan Murray	Murray Bushrangers	Port Adelaide
3	36	Jeremy Humm	North Ballarat Rebels	West Coast Eagles
3	37	Guy Richards	Eastern Ranges	Collingwood
3	38	Michael Handby	Dandenong Stingrays	Adelaide Crows
3	39	Adam McPhee	Dandenong Stingrays	Fremantle
3	40	Chris Hyde	Murray Bushrangers	Richmond
3	41	Andrew Krakouer	South Fremantle Football Club	Richmond
3	42	Daniel Pratt	Northern Eagles	Kangaroos
3	43	Mark Williams	South Fremantle Football Club	Hawthorn
3	44	Josh Hunt	Bendigo Pioneers	Geelong
3	45	Trent Carroll	Claremont Football Club	West Coast Eagles
3	46	Sean O'Keeffe	Murray Bushrangers	Carlton
3	47	Jordan Bannister	Calder Cannons	Essendon
3	48	Matthew Smith	Oakleigh Chargers	Adelaide Crows
4	49	Shane Wakelin	St Kilda	Collingwood
4	50	Domenic Cassisi	East Fremantle	Port Adelaide
4	51	Dion Woods	Perth	Fremantle
4	52	Amon Buchanan	Geelong Falcons	Sydney Swans
4	53	Hayden Skipworth	Woodville-West Torrens	Adelaide Crows
4	54	Jarrad Sundqvist	Glenelg	Sydney Swans
4	55	Chris Newman	Dandenong Stingrays	Richmond
4	56	Daniel Cross	Murray Bushrangers	Western Bulldogs
4	57	Steven Sziller	St Kilda	Richmond
4	58	Nathan Lonie	Dandenong Stingrays	Hawthorn
4	59	Luke Hammond	Sandringham Dragons	Brisbane Lions
4	60	Corey Jones	Sturt Football Club	Kangaroos
4	61	Callan Beasy	Bendigo Pioneers	Carlton
4	62	Daniel Breese	Eastern Ranges	Melbourne
4	63	Marc Bullen	Murray Bushrangers	Essendon
5	64	Mark Gale	Fremantle	St Kilda
5	65	Pass		Collingwood
5	66	Scott Thornton	Sandringham Dragons	Fremantle
5	67	Graham Johncock	Port Adelaide Magpies	Adelaide Crows
5	68	Pass		Sydney Swans
5	69	Pass		Richmond
5	70	Wayde Skipper	West Perth	Western Bulldogs
5	71	Daniel Lowther	Geelong Football Club	Geelong
5	72	Pass		Hawthorn
5	73	Ross Funcke	North Ballarat	Melbourne
5	74	Michael Davis	Sandringham Dragons	Essendon
6	75	Robert Powell	Richmond	St Kilda
6	76	Pass		Fremantle
6	77	Pass		Adelaide Crows
6	78	Pass		Western Bulldogs
6	79	Hamish Simpson	Geelong Football Club	Geelong
6	80	Mitchell Craig	Eastern Ranges	Melbourne
6	81	Pass		Essendon
7	82	Daniel Wulf	St Kilda	St Kilda
7	83	Pass		Western Bulldogs
7	84	Pass		Melbourne
8	85	Pass		St Kilda
9	86	Pass		St Kilda
10	87	Pass		St Kilda

== 2001 pre-season draft ==
Pick	Player	Recruited from	Recruited to
1	Brett Voss	Brisbane Lions	St Kilda
2	Chad Rintoul	West Coast Eagles	Collingwood
3	Troy Wilson	East Perth Football Club	West Coast Eagles
4	Simon Eastaugh	Essendon	Fremantle
5	Chris Ladhams	Essendon Reserves	Adelaide Crows
6	Stephen Tingay	Melbourne	Sydney Swans
7	Nick Bruton	Diggers Rest Football Club	Western Bulldogs
8	Matthew Dent	Western Bulldogs	Hawthorn
9	Dylan McLaren	Gippsland Power	Brisbane Lions
10	Nick Gill	Oakleigh Chargers	Melbourne
11	Pass		St Kilda
12	Adam Richardson	West Adelaide Football Club	Adelaide Crows

== 2001 rookie draft ==
Round	Pick	Player	Recruited from	Club
1	1	Chris Oliver	NSW/ACT Rams	St Kilda
1	2	Chris Odell	Dandenong U18	Collingwood
1	3	Chris Hall	South Adelaide	Port Adelaide
1	4	Dean Buszan	Peel Thunder	West Coast
1	5	Keren Ugle	South Fremantle	Fremantle
1	6	Kane McLean	Norwood	Adelaide
1	7	Michael Swan	Port Melbourne	Western Bulldogs
1	8	Garth Taylor	Fremantle	Richmond
1	9	Bernie Collins	Castlehaven GAA, Ireland	Western Bulldogs
1	10	Paul Chambers	Western U18	Geelong
1	11	Michael Osborne	Labrador	Hawthorn
1	12	David Mapleston	Morningside	Brisbane Lions
1	13	Leigh Harding	Geelong	Kangaroos
1	14	Ian Prendergast	Carlton (VFL)	Carlton
1	15	Kevin Devine	Ireland	Melbourne
1	16	Marcus Kenny	Eastern U18	Essendon
2	17	Justin Berry	Cranbourne	St Kilda
2	18	Jason Heath	Eastern U18	Collingwood
2	19	Ben Hollands	West Adelaide	Port Adelaide
2	20	Zachary Beeck	East Perth	West Coast
2	21	Roger Hayden	South Fremantle	Fremantle
2	22	Justin Cicolella	Adelaide	Adelaide
2	23	Passed	N/A	Sydney
2	24	Adrian Burgiel	Richmond (VFL)	Richmond
2	25	Damien Skurrie	Sebastopol	Western Bulldogs
2	26	Sam Chapman	Geelong U18	Geelong
2	27	Robert Campbell	Murray U18	Hawthorn
2	28	Passed	N/A	Brisbane Lions
2	29	Rod Tregenza	East Fremantle	Kangaroos
2	30	Tim Fleming	Old Xaverians	Carlton
2	31	Darren Jolly	North Ballarat	Melbourne
2	32	Damien Peverill	Essendon (VFL)	Essendon
3	33	Nathan Lovett-Murray	North Ballarat U18	Collingwood
3	34	Steven Brosnan	Port Adelaide	Port Adelaide
3	35	Andrew McCarrey	East Fremantle	West Coast
3	36	Daniel Haines	Peel Thunder	Fremantle
3	37	Matthew Golding	Adelaide (SANFL)	Adelaide
3	38	Passed	N/A	Sydney
3	39	Michael Barker	Dandenong U18	Richmond
3	40	David Sheahan	Springvale	Western Bulldogs
3	41	Max Rooke	Casterton	Geelong
3	42	Matthew Ball	Sandringham	Hawthorn
3	43	Passed	N/A	Brisbane Lions
3	44	Digby Morrell	West Perth	Kangaroos
3	45	Jim Plunkett	Western Bulldogs	Carlton
3	46	Mark Berts	Palmerston	Melbourne
3	47	Andrew Hill	North Ballarat	Collingwood
3	48	Kris Miller	East Fremantle	West Coast
4	49	Andrew Siegert	Geelong U18	Fremantle
4	50	James Gallagher	Norwood	Adelaide
4	51	Passed	N/A	Sydney
4	52	Craig Ednie	Murray U18	Richmond
4	53	Leigh Harrison	Sandringham U18	Western Bulldogs
4	54	Tim Clark	Geelong (VFL)	Geelong
4	55	Passed	N/A	Hawthorn
4	56	Passed	N/A	Brisbane Lions
4	57	David Teague	Murray Kangaroos	Kangaroos
4	58	Ben Doherty	Brisbane Lions (reserves)	Melbourne
4	59	Steven Rode	Hawthorn	Collingwood
4	60	Brent Plitz	North Albury	Sydney
4	61	Brad Fuller	Western Bulldogs (reserves)	Western Bulldogs
4	62	Passed	N/A	Hawthorn
4	63	Clinton Alleway	Mount Gravatt	Brisbane Lions
4	64	Tom Marshall	Tassie Mariners	Melbourne
5	65	Scott Muller	Sydney (reserves)	Sydney
5	66	Robert Copeland	Northern Eagles	Brisbane Lions
5	67	Tom Tarrant	Morningside	Brisbane Lions
5	68	Luke Weller	Northern Eagles	Brisbane Lions

== Rookie elevation ==
In alphabetical order of professional clubs. This list details 2000-listed rookies who were elevated to the senior list; it does not list players taken as rookies in the rookie draft which occurred during the 2000/01 off-season.

Player	Recruited from	Recruited to
Stuart Bown	Norwood Football Club	Adelaide Crows
Michael Doughty	South Adelaide Football Club	Adelaide Crows
Nathan Clarke	Maroochydore Football Club	Brisbane Lions
Shannon Rusca	Southern Districts Football Club	Brisbane Lions
Jordan Doering	Essendon Reserves	Carlton
Cory McGrath	South Fremantle	Essendon
Adam Switala	Central District	Essendon
Marcus Baldwin	Hawthorn Reserves	Geelong
Danny O'Brien	Gippsland Power	Geelong
Ryan Pagan	Kangaroos Reserves	Kangaroos Football Club
Troy Broadbridge	Port Adelaide Magpies	Melbourne
Ben Haynes	Western Jets	Richmond
Royce Vardy	Devon-Welshpool Football Club	Richmond
Brett Moyle	St Kilda Reserves	St Kilda
Dean Cox	East Perth	West Coast Eagles
Kasey Green	East Fremantle	West Coast Eagles
