= 2002 AFL Rising Star =

Annual award in the Australian Football League

2002 National AFL Rising Star
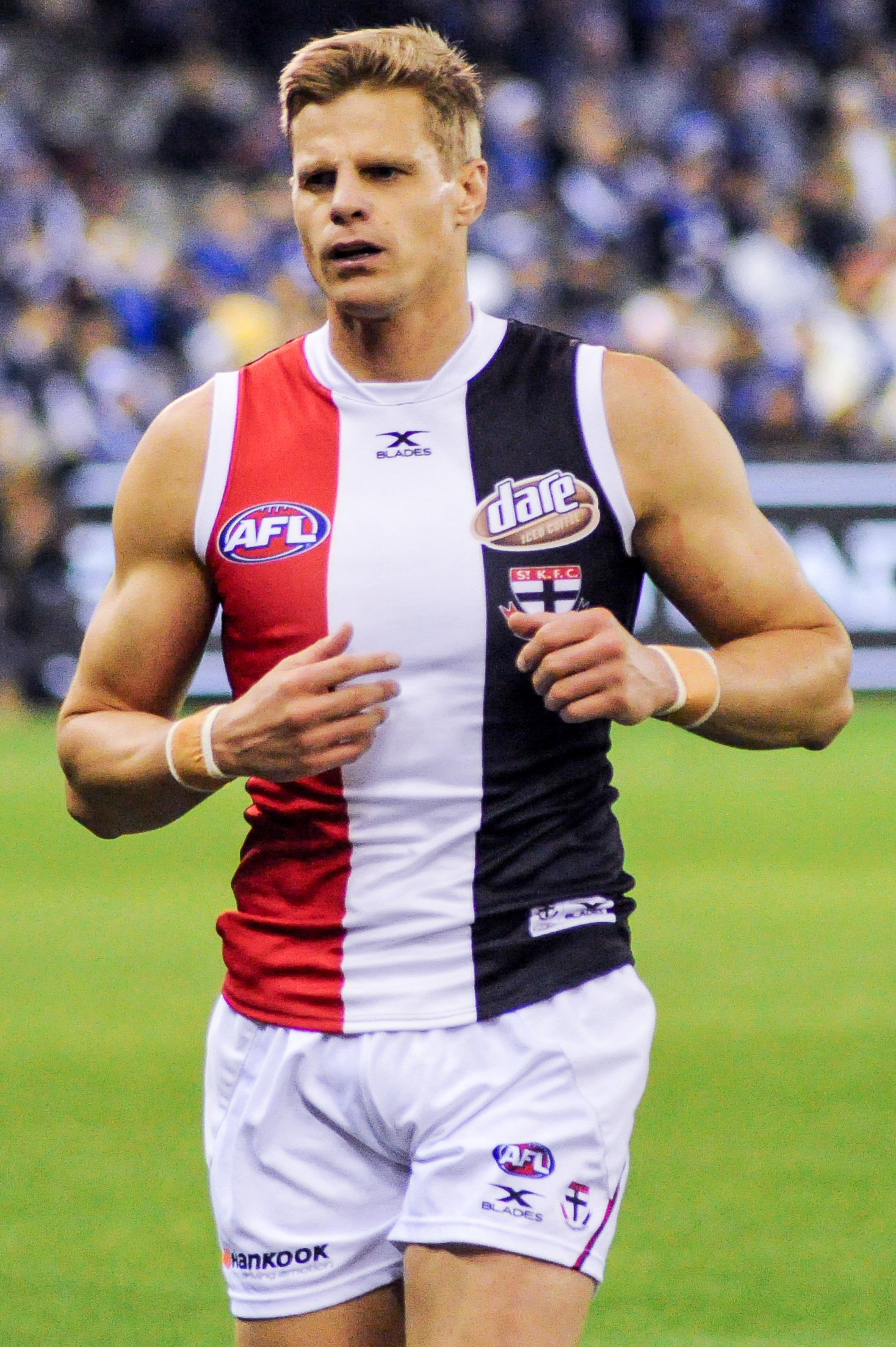
- Nick Riewoldt, winner of the 2002 AFL Rising Star award, in June 2017
- Sponsored by: National Australia Bank
- Country: Australia
- Rising Star: Nick Riewoldt (St Kilda)

The National AFL Rising Star award is given annually to a stand out young player in the Australian Football League. The 2002 medal was awarded to St Kilda player Nick Riewoldt.

== Eligibility ==
Every round, an Australian Football League rising star nomination is given to a stand out young player. To be eligible for the award, a player must be under 21 on 1 January of that year, have played 10 or fewer senior games and not been suspended during the season. At the end of the year, one of the 22 nominees is the winner of award.

== Nominations ==
Round	Player	Club	Ref.
1	Paul Medhurst	Fremantle	
2	Chris Judd	West Coast	
3	Steven Armstrong	Melbourne	
4	Jimmy Bartel	Geelong	
5	Nick Riewoldt	St Kilda	
6	Jason Cloke	Collingwood	
7	Xavier Clarke	St Kilda	
8	David Rodan	Richmond	
9	Shane Birss	Western Bulldogs	
10	Mark McGough	Collingwood	
11	Ryan Hargrave	Western Bulldogs	
12	James Kelly	Geelong	
13	Shaun Burgoyne	Port Adelaide	
14	Mark Coughlan	Richmond	
15	Luke Hodge	Hawthorn	
16	Alan Didak	Collingwood	
17	Nick Ries	Hawthorn	
18	Jordan McMahon	Western Bulldogs	
19	Tadhg Kennelly	Sydney	
20	Ty Zantuck	Richmond	
21	Jamie Charman	Brisbane Lions	
22	Campbell Brown	Hawthorn	

== Final voting ==
The seven members of the All-Australian team selection panel voted for the National AFL Rising Star for 2002, with each voter ranking their top 5 players from the 22 players nominated during the year. Nick Riewoldt was award 5 votes by six of the seven voters to win the award.

	Player	Club	Votes
1	Nick Riewoldt	St Kilda	34
2	Chris Judd	West Coast	29
3	Luke Hodge	Hawthorn	12
4	Shaun Burgoyne	Port Adelaide	10
5	Mark Coughlan	Richmond	5
5	James Kelly	Geelong	5
7	Ty Zantuck	Richmond	4
8	Jason Cloke	Collingwood	3
9	Jordan McMahon	Western Bulldogs	1
9	Tadhg Kennelly	Sydney	1
9	Jamie Charman	Brisbane Lions	1
Source: AFL Record Season Guide 2010
