= Beasy =

Beasy is a surname. Notable people with the surname include:

- Callan Beasy (born 1982), Australian rules footballer
- Doug Beasy (1930–2013), Australian rules footballer
- Maurie Beasy (1896–1979), Australian rules footballer

== See also ==
- Betsy
