= 2006 WAFL season =

Australian rules football season

- Teams: 9
- Premiers: Subiaco; 9th premiership
- Minor premiers: Subiaco; 11th minor premiership
- Sandover Medallist: Matt Priddis (Subiaco)
- Bernie Naylor Medallist: Troy Wilson (East Perth)
- Matches played: 94

The 2006 WAFL season was the 122nd season of the various incarnations of the West Australian Football League. Owing to low crowds making the city's traditional big-match venue, Subiaco Oval, uneconomic due to high overheads, the WAFL followed the AFL since 1991 by scheduling finals (except the Grand Final) at the home ground of the club higher on the ladder.

It saw the three top clubs of 2005 – Subiaco, South Fremantle and Claremont – intensify their dominance of the competition, being five games and a large percentage ahead of the remaining six clubs and losing only four games to any of the other six clubs. The only major disappointment on-field was East Perth, who for their centenary season invested considerably in recruiting but won only one extra match vis-à-vis 2005 despite widespread expectation the Royals would be the main threat to the power clubs. The Royals had numerous injury problems with their recruits and coach Warren Mahoney resigned after the club lost its first seven games for its longest losing streak since 1929. West Perth after a poor pre-season comfortably took the final place in the four, and Peel Thunder, who suffered from predictions of extreme doom despite having won the past two colts premierships, doubled their 2005 win tally with some excellent football in July and August. Swan Districts, finalists in 2004 and 2005, began well but a horror run with injuries after May whereby they lost sole ruckman Taylan Ames, Shane Beros, Craig Callaghan and Daniel Wulf meant that after inflicting the first defeat upon Subiaco the Swans could win only one of their final eleven matches, losing many of the others in spectacular fashion.

A record dry year helped produce a marked increase in scoring compared with the past decade, with the average score of 99.41 points per team per game as much as thirteen points higher than the previous season and the highest in the WAFL or Westar Rules since 1991. Included in this was a record half-time margin and the highest score in the WAFL since 1987 by South Fremantle against their struggling derby rivals, who took their second wooden spoon in three years as a dwindling support base and severe financial deficits meant the Sharks could not compete for the best players with the stronger clubs.

== Home-and-away season ==
=== Round 1 ===
	Round 1
Saturday, 25 March (2:15 pm)	East Perth 10.11 (71)	def. by	West Perth 10.16 (76)	Leederville Oval (crowd: 2585)
Saturday, 25 March (2:15 pm)	East Fremantle 5.10 (40)	def. by	South Fremantle 20.18 (138)	East Fremantle Oval (crowd: 2736)
Saturday, 25 March (2:15 pm)	Peel Thunder 17.9 (111)	def.	Perth 13.9 (87)	Rushton Park (crowd: 1137)
Saturday, 25 March (2:15 pm)	Swan Districts 12.16 (88)	def. by	Subiaco 18.9 (117)	Bassendean Oval (crowd: 2048)
	Bye; Claremont
West Perth's seemingly undersized defenders Josh Pearce, Dion Fleay and Darren Atkinson win the match against the clubs expected to be the biggest challenger to 2005's elite.; Peel coach Chris Waterman vows to keep playing the club's 2004 and 2005 colts premiership players, as the Thunder win a fast-paced and entertaining duel between the cellar-dwellers of the modern WAFL.

=== Round 2 ===
	Round 2
Friday, 31 March (6:45 pm)	South Fremantle 14.13 (97)	def.	East Perth 11.5 (71)	Fremantle Oval (crowd: 2183)
Saturday, 1 April (2:15 pm)	West Perth 17.22 (124)	def.	Peel Thunder 10.8 (68)	Arena Joondalup (crowd: 1639)
Saturday, 1 April (2:15 pm)	Subiaco 16.9 (105)	def.	Claremont 8.9 (57)	Leederville Oval (crowd: 2286)
Saturday, 1 April (2:15 pm)	Perth 17.21 (123)	def.	East Fremantle 8.11 (59)	Lathlain Park (crowd: 1375)
	Bye; Swan Districts
Former ACT player David Mapleston's excellent marking shows Subiaco – established as the richest and most professional club in the WAFL – have replaced former Bernie Naylor Medallists Brad Smith and Lachlan Oakley with remarkable efficiency, and it shows in the manner by which they overcome the Tigers.; Despite 37 possessions – 79 in two games – from 2000 Brownlow Medallist Shane Woewodin, East Fremantle are never in the hunt against a solid Perth team who are warned of the task ahead against Subiaco.

=== Round 3 ===
	Round 3
Saturday, 8 April (2:15 pm)	Claremont 16.14 (110)	def.	Swan Districts 16.7 (103)	Claremont Oval (crowd: 1447)
Saturday, 8 April (2:15 pm)	Perth 13.10 (88)	def. by	Subiaco 24.10 (154)	Lathlain Park (crowd: 1585)
Saturday, 8 April (2:15 pm)	Peel Thunder 6.16 (52)	def. by	South Fremantle 19.20 (134)	Rushton Park (crowd: 1571)
Saturday, 8 April (2:15 pm)	East Fremantle 20.14 (134)	def.	East Perth 7.15 (57)	East Fremantle Oval (crowd: 1319)
	Bye; West Perth
Subiaco take advantage of Hawthorn's failure to draft Caine Hayes – recommended to the Hawks by Subiaco coach Peter German – as he returns to a running-type role to crush the improved Demons.; Improved support for the prolific 34-possession Woewodin from Joel Sofi, Nic Polce and Kris Miller, means East Fremantle after two big losses upset the still-winless Royals, who are clear last with three tough matches to come.

=== Round 4 (Easter weekend) ===
	Round 4
Saturday, 15 April (2:15 pm)	West Perth 17.10 (112)	def. by	Swan Districts 18.13 (121)	Arena Joondalup (crowd: 2543)
Saturday, 15 April (2:15 pm)	Peel Thunder 20.16 (136)	def.	East Fremantle 15.7 (97)	Rushton Park (crowd: 1666)
Monday, 17 April (2:15 pm)	East Perth 7.11 (53)	def. by	Claremont 16.14 (110)	Leederville Oval (crowd: 2620)
Monday, 17 April (2:15 pm)	South Fremantle 20.19 (139)	def.	Perth 9.9 (63)	Fremantle Oval (crowd: 2342)
	Bye; Subiaco
Peel Thunder's opening of 10.5 (65) is their record score for any quarter. Darren Bolton's fleet-footed movement shows coach Waterman knew what he was doing when he offered the overweight 29-year-old a lifeline. Peel, however, do lose key on-baller Daniel Haines for the rest of 2006.; Swan Districts' 40-point deficit at half-time is the biggest overcome to win at Arena Joondalup.; East Perth fail to keep up with the speedy Tigers and suffer their tenth consecutive defeat, adding to severe financial problems associated with their off-season recruiting.

=== Round 5 ===
	Round 5
Friday, 21 April (6:45 pm)	Subiaco 19.15 (129)	def.	East Fremantle 2.5 (17)	Leederville Oval (crowd: 2067)
Saturday, 22 April (2:15 pm)	West Perth 13.9 (87)	def. by	South Fremantle 16.18 (114)	Arena Joondalup (crowd: 1731)
Saturday, 22 April (2:15 pm)	Swan Districts 18.9 (117)	def.	East Perth 11.13 (79)	Bassendean Oval (crowd: 2256)
Saturday, 22 April (2:15 pm)	Claremont 21.7 (133)	def.	Peel Thunder 10.16 (76)	Claremont Oval (crowd: 1257)
	Bye; Perth
In an embarrassing thrashing where Subiaco never hit peak form but are under no pressure at any stage after the Sharks had only one kick in the first twelve minutes, East Fremantle kicked: 1. their second-lowest score since 1915 (Note: Their sole lower score in this period was 2.4 (16) at Lathlain Park in Round 15 of 1967, when Old Easts did not score between the first and last ten minutes of the match.) when they kicked 2.2 (14) with a scoreless second half against Perth; 2. their second-lowest ever against Subiaco ahead of 2.4 (16) in 1912.; 3. the lowest score ever by a visiting team at Leederville Oval and the second-lowest in the history of the ground.; Coach John Dimmer dismisses talk of South Fremantle going through the season undefeated after a fourteenth consecutive victory against a depleted West Perth, who finish with seventeen fit men and cannot counter eight-goal Ryan Murphy or forty-possession Daniel Gilmore.

=== Round 6 ===
	Round 6
Friday, 28 April (6:45 pm)	South Fremantle 23.10 (148)	def.	Swan Districts 12.12 (84)	Fremantle Oval (crowd: 2202)
Friday, 28 April (6:45 pm)	East Perth 10.14 (74)	def. by	Subiaco 14.8 (92)	Leederville Oval (crowd: 2279)
Saturday, 29 April (2:15 pm)	Perth 5.15 (45)	def. by	Claremont 18.11 (119)	Lathlain Park (crowd: 1544)
Saturday, 29 April (2:15 pm)	East Fremantle 16.5 (101)	def. by	West Perth 19.7 (121)	East Fremantle Oval (crowd: 1350)
	Bye; Peel Thunder
East Perth's “flooding” tactics hold out Subiaco apart from a burst of five goals in time-on of the second quarter that consign the Royals to a twelfth consecutive loss when they were threatening the upset of the season to that point.; South Fremantle extend their winning run to fifteen matches as they run away with three goals in the last two minutes of the half after Swans score only 0.5 (5) from a long period of sustained attack in the second quarter.; Daniel Bandy is heckled by the Lathlain crowd after he joined several former AFL teammates at Claremont rather than the Demons where he began his senior football, but still plays a critical role – both in the ruck and attack – in the Tigers' big win.

=== Round 7 ===
	Round 7
Friday, 5 May (6:45 pm)	Subiaco 28.9 (177)	def.	Peel Thunder 8.7 (55)	Leederville Oval (crowd: 1514)
Saturday, 6 May (2:15 pm)	Swan Districts 13.17 (95)	def.	East Fremantle 11.8 (74)	Bassendean Oval (crowd: 1599)
Saturday, 6 May (2:15 pm)	Perth 15.11 (101)	def.	West Perth 15.8 (98)	Mukinbudin (crowd: 2008)
Sunday, 7 May (2:15 pm)	Claremont 19.13 (127)	def.	South Fremantle 6.10 (46)	Claremont Oval (crowd: 2182)
	Bye; East Perth
Claremont break South's fifteen-match winning streak thanks to a miserly defence that allows no goals after quarter-time except one brief three-goal burst, plus an amazing display by ex-Docker centre half-forward Anthony Jones. Jones finished with 25 possessions, 14 marks, and kicks 6.2 (38).; A concrete-and-matting based cricket strip across the centre of Mukinbudin's oval caused rival captains Simon Duckworth (West Perth) and Chris Bossong (Perth) to imagine they were tossing for innings, and caused much criticism of the WAFL for taking the league to towns lacking the requisite infrastructure. Perth won a thriller after being behind narrowly most of the afternoon.

=== Round 8 ===
	Round 8
Friday, 12 May (6:45 pm)	Subiaco 20.18 (138)	def.	West Perth 14.6 (90)	Leederville Oval (crowd: 2325)
Saturday, 13 May (2:15 pm)	East Fremantle 15.9 (99)	def. by	Claremont 21.15 (141)	East Fremantle Oval (crowd: 1129)
Saturday, 13 May (2:15 pm)	Peel Thunder 12.12 (84)	def. by	Swan Districts 27.19 (181)	Rushton Park (crowd: 1169)
Saturday, 13 May (2:15 pm)	Perth 19.12 (126)	def.	East Perth 11.9 (75)	Lathlain Park (crowd: 1663)
	Bye; South Fremantle
Perth comfortably win to create a surprise challenge for the finals but rookie coach Simon Eastaugh is not happy with his team's skill against the winless Royals, whose thirteenth consecutive loss was their longest run of “outs” since 1929.; Ex-St. Kilda defender Daniel Wulf constantly streaks into attack to decimate Peel after half-time, when he scores an amazing three goals amongst Swans' 17.9 (111) to 3.8 (26) romp for the half.

=== Round 9 ===
	Round 9
Friday, 19 May (6:45 pm)	South Fremantle 19.7 (121)	def. by	Subiaco 19.14 (128)	Fremantle Oval (crowd: 2125)
Saturday, 20 May (2:15 pm)	Claremont 16.18 (114)	def.	West Perth 8.12 (60)	Claremont Oval (crowd: 1535)
Saturday, 20 May (2:15 pm)	Swan Districts 17.17 (119)	def.	Perth 12.10 (82)	Bassendean Oval (crowd: 2101)
Saturday, 20 May (2:15 pm)	East Perth 22.14 (146)	def.	Peel Thunder 12.11 (83)	Manjimup (crowd: 1965)
	Bye; East Fremantle
East Perth's strong forward give them an easy first win for 2006 under new coach Peos. Troy Wilson scores nine goals to justify his state selection, but Andrew Merrington and Ben McKinley play equally well.

=== Round 10 ===
	Round 10
Saturday, 3 June (2:15 pm)	Subiaco 18.7 (115)	def. by	Swan Districts 21.11 (137)	Leederville Oval (crowd: 1953)
Saturday, 3 June (2:15 pm)	Perth 20.14 (134)	def.	Peel Thunder 9.6 (60)	Lathlain Park (crowd: 1815)
Monday, 5 June (2:15 pm)	West Perth 11.7 (73)	def. by	East Perth 14.12 (96)	Arena Joondalup (crowd: 6477)
Monday, 5 June (2:15 pm)	South Fremantle 35.13 (223)	def.	East Fremantle 9.12 (66)	Fremantle Oval (crowd: 8129)
	Bye; Claremont
In inflicting Subiaco's first defeat of the season, Swan Districts break a record losing streak of thirteen against the Lions, with their previous win being in Kununurra during the fourteenth round of 2000. Swans' win is amazing given they were without Daniel Wulf, Shane Beros, Morris Coppin and Daniel Piani, and leading goalkicker Chris Maguires scores only two behinds. Adam Lange, overlooked by state selectors, gave a dominant 28-possession display.; In front of the season's biggest non-Grand Final crowd and the unveiling of a statue to commemorate John Gerovich's famous mark in the 1956 Preliminary Final between the two clubs, South Fremantle achieve the biggest half-time lead in open-age WA(N)FL competition, leading by 20.6 (126) to 1.8 (14). They finished with the highest score in the WAFL since Claremont kicked 33.28 (226) against East Perth in 1987.; South Fremantle set records for highest score and biggest margin over their derby rivals, beating 107 points from 1980 and 28.21 (189) from 1976.; Seven Bulldogs score three or more goals, with Ryan Murphy kicking five in the second half after starting in defence, and Daniel Gilmore score two from seven shots and over 40 possessions.

=== Round 11 ===
	Round 11
Saturday, 10 June (2:15 pm)	Peel Thunder 12.13 (85)	def. by	West Perth 20.16 (136)	Rushton Park (crowd: 955)
Saturday, 10 June (2:15 pm)	Claremont 14.12 (96)	def.	Subiaco 12.8 (80)	Claremont Oval (crowd: 2724)
Saturday, 10 June (2:15 pm)	East Fremantle 9.13 (67)	def. by	Perth 10.13 (73)	East Fremantle Oval (crowd: 1313)
Saturday, 10 June (2:15 pm)	East Perth 12.8 (80)	def. by	South Fremantle 16.12 (108)	Leederville Oval (crowd: 1808)
	Bye; Swan Districts
Perth win only their fifth game at East Fremantle Oval since 1980 to rise to clear fifth when the siren sounded before Tim Malseed could kick an easy goal that would have produced the WAFL's first drawn match since the opening round of 2003. (Note: Had Malseed been able to kick the goal, he would have produced Perth's first draw since the opening round of 1986, the first draw between the two clubs since 1923, and East Fremantle's first home-and-away draw since the third round of 1974. The latter two streaks remain unbroken as of 2025, whilst Perth would have its – and the league's – next draw in mid-2008.); Key forwards Ryan Hewitt and Ryan Murphy each kick five goals and take nineteen marks between them as South Fremantle kick the first seven goals, which proves enough to win despite tough East Perth resistance.

=== Round 12 ===
	Round 12
Friday, 16 June (2:15 pm)	South Fremantle 22.10 (142)	def.	Peel Thunder 11.14 (80)	Fremantle Oval (crowd: 1068)
Saturday, 17 June (2:15 pm)	Swan Districts 11.16 (82)	def. by	Claremont 23.14 (152)	Bassendean Oval (crowd: 1674)
Saturday, 17 June (2:15 pm)	Subiaco 19.13 (127)	def.	Perth 13.7 (85)	Kambalda (crowd: 1529)
Saturday, 17 June (2:15 pm)	East Perth 18.16 (124)	def.	East Fremantle 14.14 (98)	Leederville Oval (crowd: 1449)
	Bye; West Perth
Perth coach Simon Eastaugh is pleased with his club's effort, saying they showed the ability to match it with Subiaco until three quick goals midway through the third quarter moved the Lions clear for good.; Swans' loss of ruckman Ames allowed Tiger follower Michael Gardiner to run rings around the black and whites and leave the top three twelve points clear.

=== Round 13 ===
	Round 13
Saturday, 24 June (2:15 pm)	East Fremantle 22.13 (145)	def.	Peel Thunder 7.9 (51)	East Fremantle Oval (crowd: 1893)
Saturday, 24 June (2:15 pm)	Swan Districts 11.3 (69)	def. by	West Perth 20.21 (141)	Bassendean Oval (crowd: 4314)
Saturday, 24 June (2:15 pm)	Claremont 15.8 (98)	def. by	East Perth 19.6 (120)	Claremont Oval (crowd: 1853)
Saturday, 24 June (2:15 pm)	Perth 12.15 (87)	def.	South Fremantle 8.8 (56)	Lathlain Park (crowd: 1605)
	Bye; Subiaco
Perth's impressive commitment moves them within a game of the four, but coach Eastaugh refused to talk “finals”. South Fremantle challenge and early Demon lead for a brief period during the final quarter before a Richard Kelly tackle in defence leads to a goal to Shane Paap, which that player immediately duplicates.; With eleven goals against Eagle-listed Brett Jones, Troy Wilson becomes the first Royal to kick double figures in a match for a decade as East Perth, winless after eight weeks, record a major upset.; West Coast interchange ruckman Mark Seaby takes advantage of Gardiner's AFL recall to decimate a Swan Districts ruck duo with eight WAFL matches between them and leave Swans in the four only on percentage.

=== Round 14 ===
	Round 14
Saturday, 1 July (2:15 pm)	Peel Thunder 13.11 (89)	def. by	Claremont 14.11 (95)	Rushton Park (crowd: 936)
Saturday, 1 July (2:15 pm)	East Perth 20.16 (136)	def.	Swan Districts 8.9 (57)	Leederville Oval (crowd: 2804)
Saturday, 1 July (2:15 pm)	South Fremantle 15.10 (100)	def.	West Perth 10.18 (78)	Fremantle Oval (crowd: 1814)
Saturday, 1 July (2:15 pm)	East Fremantle 11.4 (70)	def. by	Subiaco 21.21 (147)	East Fremantle Oval (crowd: 1380)
	Bye; Perth
East Perth coach Peos talks “finals” for the first time as a crushing win, led by Craig Wulff and Andrew Merrington, over Swan Districts leaves the victims inside the four by only 0.5 percent.; A harsh training session after the Perth loss has a South Fremantle team depleted by injuries and Docker calls holding out an inaccurate West Perth to stay second and keep the Falcons a game out of the four.; Peel coach Waterman laments injuries after an inspired third quarter has the Thunder on track to defeat one of the pacesetters before “one-on-one” tactics that Peel cannot handle win the game for the Tigers in the last.

=== Round 15 ===
	Round 15
Saturday, 8 July (2:15 pm)	West Perth 16.15 (111)	def.	East Fremantle 14.15 (99)	Arena Joondalup (crowd: 1245)
Saturday, 8 July (2:15 pm)	Swan Districts 14.10 (94)	def. by	South Fremantle 18.14 (122)	Bassendean Oval (crowd: 1956)
Saturday, 8 July (2:15 pm)	Subiaco 17.13 (115)	def.	East Perth 8.17 (65)	Leederville Oval (crowd: 2623)
Saturday, 8 July (2:15 pm)	Claremont 22.17 (149)	def.	Perth 9.6 (60)	Claremont Oval (crowd: 1525)
	Bye; Peel Thunder
East Perth fade out after a very tough three quarters, with ex-Royals Caine Hayes and Paul Ridley booed for their sparking of the Lions when they are rested late in the match.; East Fremantle fall apart after a strong start, but the match analysis is dominated by coach Dunbar's accusation that playmaker Shane Woewodin, who was kept quiet by Ray Bartholemew, was illegally impeded for most of the match.

=== Round 16 ===
	Round 16
Friday, 14 July (6:45 pm)	South Fremantle 9.11 (65)	def.	Claremont 9.8 (62)	Fremantle Oval (crowd: 2859)
Saturday, 15 July (2:15 pm)	Perth 7.10 (52)	def. by	West Perth 16.20 (116)	Lathlain Park (crowd: 1809)
Saturday, 15 July (2:15 pm)	Peel Thunder 10.11 (71)	def. by	Subiaco 15.8 (98)	Rushton Park (crowd: 1172)
Saturday, 15 July (2:15 pm)	East Fremantle 29.7 (181)	def.	Swan Districts 12.9 (81)	East Fremantle Oval (crowd: 1573)
	Bye; East Perth
South Fremantle move ahead in the battle for second position as they just hold off a Claremont team that in dewy conditions did not goal between quarter-time and ten minutes into the last quarter.; Despite midweek predictions that Perth and East Perth would fight out fourth position, West Perth are the team to take advantage of Swan Districts' thrashing by jumping the Demons and never being threatened even when Andrew McDougall kicks his four goals for the game in the third quarter.; East Fremantle, with only two wins in thirteen matches, kick their most accurate score by excess of goals over behinds and the most accurate against Swan Districts. It is their second highest score and most goals ever against Swan Districts. Former defender Andrew McCarrey kicks eleven goals straight and Michael Griffiths against shows Swans' ruck weakness and gives Woewodin and Kris Miller complete midfield control.; Peel Thunder lead Subiaco for all but the first thirteen and last thirteen minutes – before the Lions escape a giant upset by kicking 10.1 (61) in the final quarter of what was previously a low-scoring match.

=== Round 17 ===
	Round 17
Saturday, 22 July (2:15 pm)	West Perth 13.15 (93)	def. by	Subiaco 21.9 (135)	Arena Joondalup (crowd: 1901)
Saturday, 22 July (2:15 pm)	East Perth 13.15 (93)	def. by	Perth 16.9 (105)	Leederville Oval (crowd: 1887)
Saturday, 22 July (2:15 pm)	Claremont 23.8 (146)	def.	East Fremantle 9.9 (63)	Claremont Oval (crowd: 1622)
Saturday, 22 July (2:15 pm)	Swan Districts 12.10 (82)	def. by	Peel Thunder 14.15 (99)	Bassendean Oval (crowd: 1458)
	Bye; South Fremantle
Perth move to within percentage of the four with a favourable draw remaining whilst East Perth are eliminated after a slow start and the loss of key defender Craig Wulff.; Peel end a run of ten consecutive losses in a spiteful match, whereby young rover Haydn Ballantyne overcomes being hit and treated in the opening quarter to be the dominant player for the remainder of the match. Owing to Peel's failure to formally complain, Ballantyne was the only player reported on video evidence and was suspended for headbutting despite his great performance.

=== Round 18 ===
	Round 18
Saturday, 29 July (2:15 pm)	Subiaco 16.10 (106)	def.	South Fremantle 13.10 (88)	Leederville Oval (crowd: 1215)
Saturday, 29 July (2:15 pm)	Peel Thunder 16.14 (110)	def.	East Perth 9.11 (65)	Rushton Park (crowd: 911)
Saturday, 29 July (2:15 pm)	Perth 9.11 (65)	def. by	Swan Districts 16.13 (109)	Lathlain Park (crowd: 1517)
Saturday, 29 July (2:15 pm)	West Perth 15.3 (93)	def.	Claremont 12.12 (84)	Arena Joondalup (crowd: 1198)
	Bye; East Fremantle
Former Perth spearhead Chris Maguire returns after one week in the reserves to end a Swan Districts horror stretch with four of eight final quarter goals against a passionless Demon team.; Anthony Tsalikis, who trained at Hopetoun and worked in Ravensthorpe as an engineer, gives West Perth an upset win to move clear in the four against expectations of Perth taking their place.; Returned forward Dean Buszan kicks eight goals in a match for the second time, being as of 2013 one of only two Thunder players to do this. As of 2014, Buszan holds the record for most goals in a match on both sides of Peel v East Perth.

=== Round 19 ===
	Round 19
Saturday, 5 August (2:15 pm)	East Fremantle 12.7 (79)	def. by	South Fremantle 15.11 (101)	East Fremantle Oval (crowd: 1740)
Saturday, 5 August (2:15 pm)	East Perth 12.9 (81)	def. by	West Perth 23.17 (155)	Leederville Oval (crowd: 2228)
Saturday, 5 August (2:15 pm)	Perth 10.10 (70)	def. by	Subiaco 18.15 (123)	Lathlain Park (crowd: 1318)
Saturday, 5 August (2:15 pm)	Claremont 22.17 (149)	def.	Swan Districts 13.12 (90)	Broome (crowd: 3950)
	Bye; Peel Thunder
For the third occasion in four matches, Subiaco race away after being in difficulties for most of the contest, as a “wall of players” in the Demon midfield stops Subiaco's running game until Josh Wooden is moved into the centre and uses his skill to break the “wall” down.; Mark LeCras' 7.5 (47) from over thirty possessions – including thirteen in the first quarter – leaves West Perth two wins clear inside the four, virtually sealing the finalists with a month of the home-and-away season remaining.

=== Round 20 ===
	Round 20
Friday, 11 August (6:45 pm)	South Fremantle 22.14 (146)	def.	Peel Thunder 8.6 (54)	Fremantle Oval (crowd: 1557)
Saturday, 12 August (2:15 pm)	East Fremantle 9.14 (68)	def. by	East Perth 21.9 (135)	East Fremantle Oval (crowd: 1212)
	Bye; Claremont, Perth, Subiaco, Swan Districts, West Perth
Debutant Callum Wilson's five goals leads South Fremantle to a brilliant win after having trailed by fifteen points early in the second quarter.

=== Round 21 ===
	Round 21
Saturday, 19 August (2:15 pm)	West Perth 8.15 (63)	def. by	Peel Thunder 11.11 (77)	Arena Joondalup (crowd: 1022)
Saturday, 19 August (2:15 pm)	Swan Districts 8.8 (56)	def. by	South Fremantle 11.11 (77)	Bassendean Oval (crowd: 1288)
Saturday, 19 August (2:15 pm)	Subiaco 16.11 (107)	def.	Claremont 8.14 (62)	Leederville Oval (crowd: 1351)
Saturday, 19 August (2:15 pm)	Perth 6.10 (46)	def. by	East Fremantle 17.15 (117)	Lathlain Park (crowd: 1109)
	Bye; East Perth
Cameron Heise's ability to put pressure on Paul Medhurst, along with Subiaco's ability to spread the goalscoring with ten single goalkickers all but seals the double chance and Subiaco's “home” final.; Peel's commitment and efficient ball use have them ahead of the Falcons almost all afternoon on the only wet day of the season despite a few bad discipline errors, in the process virtually sealing the wooden spoon with East Fremantle's last hope to defeat almost invincible Subiaco.; Port Melbourne recruits Michael Griffiths, Joel Sofi and James Kondarovskis combine for the first time to end the finals hopes of an uninspiring Perth and mathematically keep the Sharks' hopes of avoiding the wooden spoon alive.

=== Round 22 ===
	Round 22
Saturday, 26 August (2:15 pm)	Subiaco 26.17 (173)	def.	East Fremantle 13.7 (85)	Leederville Oval (crowd: 1826)
Saturday, 26 August (2:15 pm)	Peel Thunder 14.16 (100)	def.	Perth 11.11 (77)	Rushton Park (crowd: 1076)
Saturday, 26 August (2:15 pm)	West Perth 19.12 (126)	def.	Swan Districts 7.12 (54)	Arena Joondalup (crowd: 1531)
Saturday, 26 August (2:15 pm)	Claremont 22.15 (147)	def.	East Perth 10.9 (69)	Claremont Oval (crowd: 1722)
	Bye; South Fremantle
Eight goals from in-form Mark LeCras – an Eagle emergency in Brisbane when the Falcons lost to Peel – fails to add confidence because of the prospect of a permanent AFL call-up weakening the club.

=== Round 23 ===
	Round 23
Friday, 1 September (6:45 pm)	South Fremantle 17.11 (113)	def.	West Perth 5.16 (46)	Fremantle Oval (crowd: 1989)
Saturday, 2 September (2:15 pm)	Swan Districts 11.11 (77)	def. by	Subiaco 22.17 (149)	Bassendean Oval (crowd: 1661)
Saturday, 2 September (2:15 pm)	East Perth 24.8 (152)	def.	Perth 13.10 (88)	Leederville Oval (crowd: 1764)
Saturday, 2 September (2:15 pm)	Peel Thunder 18.13 (121)	def. by	Claremont 20.14 (134)	Rushton Park (crowd: 1116)
	Bye; East Fremantle
With Mark LeCras kicking five goals for West Coast and Josh Head blanketing Tsalikis, West Perth's attack fails completely and give no sign they can match the top three in the finals.; Peel record the second highest losing score in their history as Buszan kicks eight goals in a match for the third time, remaining the sole Thunder player to do so until 2008. He did this despite having a dog chew up his football boots six weeks beforehand.; The Thunder trailed by 64 points early in the third quarter after Claremont kicked 10.7 (67) to 1.0 (6) in the second quarter, but their determination has them come back strongly in the best form in their WAFL history.

== Ladder ==
2006 WAFL ladder
Pos	Team	Pld	W	L	D	PF	PA	PP	Pts
1	Subiaco (P)	20	18	2	0	2515	1589	158.3	72
2	South Fremantle	20	16	4	0	2278	1540	147.9	64
3	Claremont	20	15	5	0	2285	1626	140.5	60
4	West Perth	20	10	10	0	1999	1873	106.7	40
5	East Perth	20	7	13	0	1842	2057	89.5	28
6	Swan Districts	20	7	13	0	1896	2318	81.8	28
7	Perth	20	7	13	0	1657	2143	77.3	28
8	Peel Thunder	20	6	14	0	1662	2396	69.4	24
9	East Fremantle	20	4	16	0	1759	2351	74.8	16

Rules for classification: 1) points; 2) percentage; 3) number of points for.
(P) Premiers

== Finals ==
=== First semi-final ===
	First semi-final
Sunday, 10 September (2:15 pm)	Claremont 21.18 (144)	def.	West Perth 8.10 (58)	Claremont Oval (crowd: 3,302)
This was the first final ever played at Claremont Oval, and underlined the superiority of the top three with the Falcons' heaviest defeat since 1997, despite Claremont losing Paul Medhurst to the AFL.

=== Second semi-final ===
	Second semi-final
Sunday, 10 September (2:15 pm)	Subiaco 15.7 (97)	def.	South Fremantle 12.18 (90)	Leederville Oval (crowd: 5,084)
This was the first final at Leederville since the 1935 First Semi between East Perth and East Fremantle – the last season before all finals were played at Subiaco due to the league establishing permanent headquarters there.; Subiaco came from 25 points down to beat a South Fremantle team that kicked only five goals in the second half from sixty entries inside their forward fifty metres.

=== Preliminary final ===
	Preliminary final
Sunday, 17 September (2:15 pm)	South Fremantle 16.13 (109)	def.	Claremont 16.10 (106)	Subiaco Oval (crowd: 4,811)
South Fremantle hang on when a Claremont kick on the siren does not make the distance but have problems with the availability of key players Andrew Siegert, Ashton Hams, Travis Gaspar and Daniel Gilmore.

=== Grand Final ===
2006 WAFL Grand Final
Saturday, 23 September	Subiaco	def.	South Fremantle	Subiaco Oval (crowd: 21,291)
5.0 (30); 9.2 (56); 14.5 (89); 24.9 (153)	Q1; Q2; Q3; Final	3.6 (24); 5.8 (38); 8.9 (57); 10.10 (70)	Umpires: Greg Bandy, Gareth Parker, Todd Keating; Simpson Medal: Marc Webb (Subiaco)
Larkins 7, Keevers 3, Mapleston 3, Hall 2, Cossom, Holmes, Haynes, Hayes, Webb, Schofield, Broughton, Pickett, Robbins	Goals	Sampi 3, White 2, McGrath 2, Hewitt, Ashton Hams, Adams
Newick, Webb, Parker, Randall, Schofield, Haynes, Larkins	Best	Duffield, Jones, Head, Thornton, Adams, Kyle Hams
Reports	David Gault for unduly rough play
Subiaco completely dominate against a Bulldog side with Gaspar, Siegert and Gilmore under fitness clouds, kicking 15.7 (97) to 5.2 (32) after half-time.
