= Scott Thornton =

Scott Thornton may refer to:

- Scott Thornton (footballer) (born 1982), Australian rules footballer
- Scott Thornton (ice hockey) (born 1971), Canadian form National Hockey League player
