= Craig Willis =

Craig Willis may refer to:

- Craig Willis (announcer) (born 1954), Australian TV and event announcer
- Craig Willis (rugby union) (born 1995), English rugby union player
