= Bendigo Pioneers =

Names
- Full name: Bendigo Pioneers Football Club
- Nickname: Pioneers

2026 season
- After finals: 12th
- Home-and-away season: 12th

Club details
- Founded: 1993; 33 years ago
- Colours: Navy Blue Sky Blue Yellow
- Competition: Talent League
- Coach: Danny O’Bree
- Premierships: Talent League (0)
- Ground: Queen Elizabeth Oval, Bendigo

Other information
- Official website: BPFC

The Bendigo Pioneers is an Australian rules football team in the statewide Victorian under-18s league, the Talent League.

== History ==
The Bendigo Pioneers is an Australian rules football team playing in Talent League since 1993 based in Bendigo, Victoria, Australia. The idea behind the Bendigo Pioneers is to train its players and prepare them for professional football. The team is divided into under-15s, under-16s, and under-18s. The Pioneers train at Epsom/Huntly Oval, Epsom. Their jersey colours are blue, white and yellow with blue, white and yellow socks and blue (home) or white (away) shorts. They are within the largest geographical region, from Bendigo to Broken Hill, therefore having the largest area to recruit from; but have been the least successful club in the competition, winning no premierships and finishing last on ten occasions as of 2021.

== Notable players and coaches ==
Some notable players from the Bendigo Pioneers are record holders for most games played and most goals scored within the team, which are David Favelaiki and Stephen Reaper. Favelaiki played a record 49 games with the Pioneers, and Reaper scored 132 goals.

== Honours ==
- Premierships: Nil
- Runners-up (1): 2001
- Minor Premiers: Nil
- Wooden Spoons (10): 1993, 1994, 2005, 2006, 2010, 2011, 2014, 2015, 2017, 2018

== Grand Finals ==
Season	Premiers	GF Score	Runner-up	Best-on-ground
2001	Calder Cannons	16.14 (110) – 10.13 (73)	Bendigo Pioneers	Jordan Barham

== Draftees ==
Many notable players in the Australian Football League have been recruited from Bendigo. These players include:

- 1993: Rowan Warfe, Ashley Thompson
- 1994: N/A
- 1995: Nick Carter, Brent Frewen
- 1996: Nathan Brown, Damien Lock, Michael Braun
- 1997: Mark Alvey, Matt Blake, Jordan Doering, Paul McMahon, Dean Solomon, Chris Tarrant, Nathan Thompson
- 1998: Michael O'Brien
- 1999: Brent Guerra, Kane Munro
- 2000: Daniel Harris, Luke Livingston, Josh Hunt, Callan Beasy
- 2001: Nick Dal Santo, Daniel Elstone, Hugh Foott, Rick Ladson, Ashley Watson
- 2002: Adam Selwood, Josh Thewlis, Troy Selwood
- 2003: Andrew Walker, Colin Sylvia
- 2004: N/A
- 2005: Travis Baird
- 2006: Joel Selwood, Daniel Connors, Andrew Collins
- 2007: Eljay Connors, Scott Selwood, Robbie Tarrant, Toby Thoolen
- 2008: N/A
- 2009: Dustin Martin, Jordan Williams
- 2010: Ariel Steinberg
- 2011: Sam Kerridge
- 2012: Jake Stringer, Ollie Wines
- 2013: N/A
- 2014: Billy Evans, Jaden McGrath
- 2015: Tom Cole, Aidyn Johnson
- 2016: Joe Atley, Kobe Mutch, Kayle Kirby, Fergus Greene
- 2017: Paddy Dow, Lochie O'Brien, Jarrod Brander, Brent Daniels, Kane Farrell, Angus Schumacher, Derek Eggmolesse-Smith
- 2018: Jye Caldwell
- 2019: Brodie Kemp, Thomson Dow, Flynn Perez, Brady Rowles
- 2020: Seamus Mitchell, Josh Treacy, Jack Ginnivan, Will Shaw
- 2021: Cooper Hamilton
- 2022: Harvey Gallagher, Noah Long, Jason Gillbee
- 2023: Harley Reid
- 2024: Tobie Travaglia, Jobe Shanahan, James Barrat, Archer Day-Wicks
- 2025: N/A
