= Andrew McDougall =

Australian rules footballer

Personal information
- Full name: Andrew McDougall
- Nickname: Doogs
- Born: 29 June 1983 (age 43)
- Original team: Perth (WAFL)
- Height: 195 cm (6 ft 5 in)
- Weight: 93 kg (205 lb)

Playing career^{1}
Years	Club	Games (Goals)
2001–2006	West Coast	38 (48)
2007–2008	Western Bulldogs	5 (2)
Total		43 (50)
- ^{1} Playing statistics correct to the end of 2008.

Career highlights
- AFL Rising Star nominee 2003; Subiaco premiership side 2014

Andrew McDougall (born 29 June 1983) is a former Australian rules footballer who played for the West Coast Eagles and Western Bulldogs in the Australian Football League (AFL).

== Junior football and draft ==
McDougall played his junior football at the South Perth Junior Football Club and his school football at Wesley College in Perth, Western Australia. He was seen as a potential professional player from a young age as his height made him stand out on the football field. He won the junior football league's Best and Fairest award at under 14s level. He was touted as a potential number one draft pick. However, a torn calf muscle did not allow him to perform to his full potential at the AFL draft camp and as a result Nick Riewoldt was selected as the number one pick. McDougall was recruited as the number 5 draft pick in the 2000 AFL draft from Perth.

== Career at the West Coast Eagles ==
McDougall made his debut for the West Coast Eagles in Round 22, 2002 against the Kangaroos in Canberra. He was plagued by injuries and indifferent form, and was much maligned by West Coast supporters for being an underachieving talent. 2004 was McDougall's best season at West Coast, in which he kicked 35 goals from 21 games. This included a four-goal haul against then-Brisbane Lions defender Mal Michael at the Gabba before half time.

McDougall was selected in round 1, 2005 despite a shoulder injury limiting his pre-season. He re-injured the shoulder early in the game and was sidelined until round 16.

He only managed one AFL game in 2006, forcing his way into the team after a string of good performances in the WAFL, only to be dropped after West Coast's defeat to Collingwood.

At the end of the 2006 season West Coast offered McDougall a one-year contract, but due to lack of opportunities at the club he opted to be traded to the Western Bulldogs who had shown an interest in McDougall over the past few years.

== Career at the Western Bulldogs ==
On day four of the 2006 Trade Week, a deal was struck between the Western Bulldogs and West Coast. The Eagles received the Western Bulldogs' second and fourth-round draft picks in exchange for McDougall, and the Eagles owned second and fourth-round picks. Before the 2007 season commenced, Western Bulldogs coach Rodney Eade said the additions of new recruits Andrew McDougall and Jason Akermanis would make the team genuine premiership chances over the next three years.

He played five games for the Bulldogs in his short career. McDougall's best game was against Hawthorn in round 21 where he received four votes in the Bulldogs' 2007 Best and Fairest Award. The cult following he generated among some Bulldogs fans was highlighted by the standing ovation he received when Master of Ceremonies Craig Willis announced the votes.

However, McDougall was unable to break into the Bulldogs team the following season and announced his retirement from the club on 17 July 2008.

== Post-AFL career ==
After retiring from the AFL, McDougall returned home to WA, playing for Perth and Subiaco in the WAFL from 2010 to 2013. He is currently working as a player agent in Perth.
