= Kobe Mutch =

Australian rules footballer

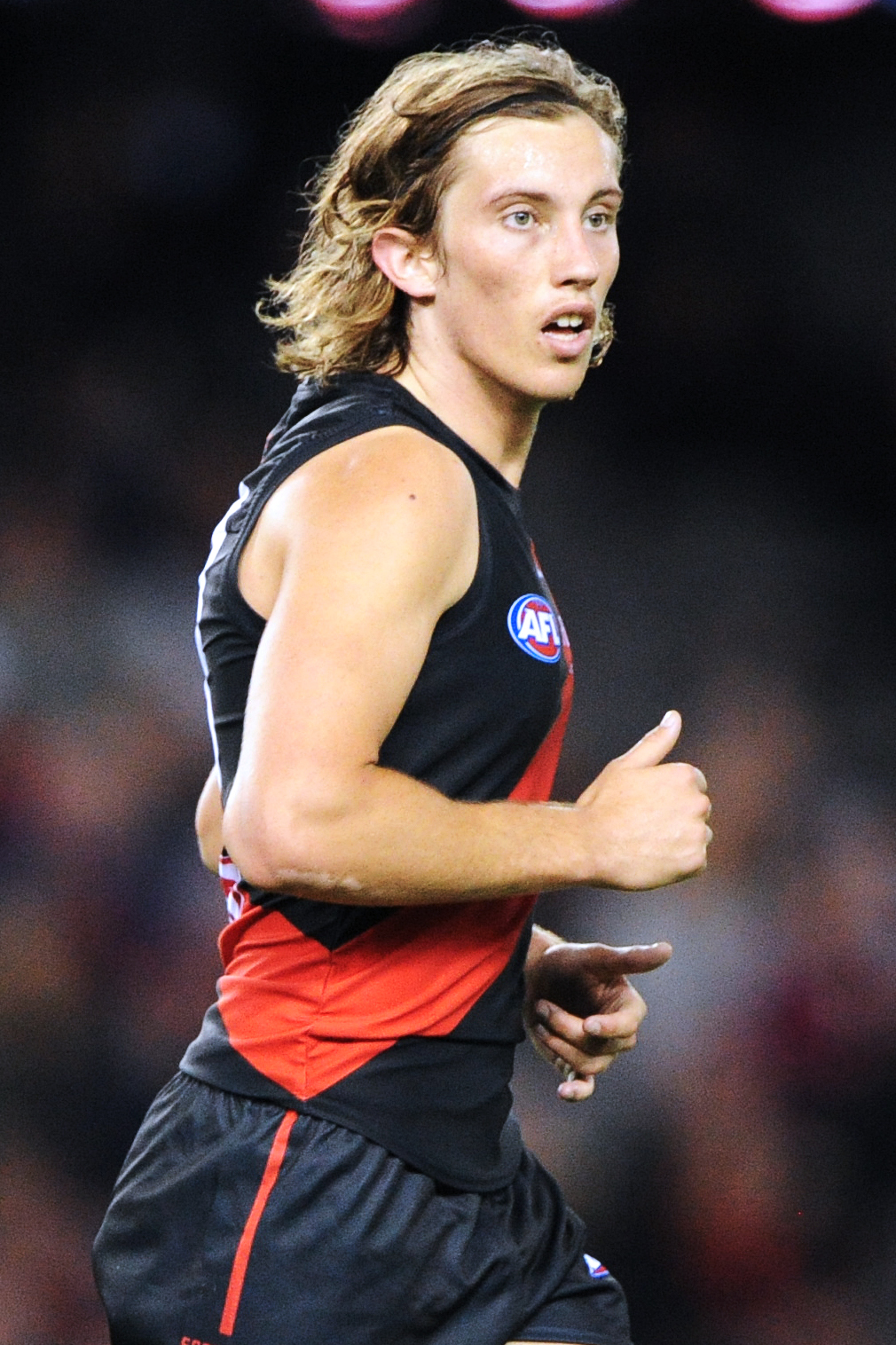
- Mutch playing for Essendon in April 2018

Personal information
- Born: 18 March 1998 (age 28)
- Original team: Bendigo Pioneers (TAC Cup)/Gol Gol(NSW)/North Broken Hill(NSW)
- Draft: No. 42, 2016 national draft
- Debut: Round 6, 2018, Essendon vs. Melbourne, at Etihad Stadium
- Height: 187 cm (6 ft 2 in)
- Weight: 83 kg (183 lb)
- Position: Midfielder

Club information
- Current club: Essendon
- Number: 19

Playing career^{1}
Years	Club	Games (Goals)
2017–2020	Essendon	4 (1)
- ^{1} Playing statistics correct to the end of round 8, 2018.

Career highlights
- SANFL premiership player: 2021

Kobe Mutch (born 18 March 1998) is a former professional Australian rules footballer who played for the Essendon Football Club in the Australian Football League (AFL) between 2017 and 2020. Mutch, who was named in the 2016 Under 18s All-Australian team, was selected by Essendon with their fourth selection and forty-second overall in the 2016 national draft. He spent the 2017 season in Essendon's reserves team in the Victorian Football League (VFL), where he came second in Essendon's best and fairest. He made his senior debut in the thirty-six point loss to Melbourne at Etihad Stadium in round six of the 2018 season. On September 20, 2020, Essendon announced that Mutch would not be offered a contract for the 2021 season.
