= Nick Bruton =

Australian rules footballer

Personal information
- Full name: Nicholas Bruton
- Born: 17 August 1981 (age 45)
- Original team: Diggers Rest (RDFL)
- Draft: No. 7, 2001 Preseason Draft

Playing career^{1}
Years	Club	Games (Goals)
2003	Western Bulldogs	2 (0)
- ^{1} Playing statistics correct to the end of 2012.

Nicholas Bruton (born 17 August 1981) is a former Australian rules footballer who played with the Western Bulldogs in the Australian Football League (AFL) in 2003. He also played for the Coburg VFL team.
