= Matthew Francis (footballer) =

Australian rules footballer

Personal information
- Full name: Matthew Francis
- Born: 29 August 1970 (age 56)
- Original team: Ballan
- Draft: No. 19, 1988 national draft
- Height: 196 cm (6 ft 5 in)
- Weight: 103 kg (227 lb)

Playing career^{1}
Years	Club	Games (Goals)
1990–1995	Richmond	19 (13)
1996–1998	Collingwood	36 (10)
Total		55 (23)
- ^{1} Playing statistics correct to the end of 1998.

Matthew Francis (born 29 August 1970) is a former Australian rules footballer who played with Richmond and Collingwood in the Australian Football League (AFL). Until 2015, he served as the Skills Development Manager at the Brisbane Lions.

Francis was an injury plagued ruckman and key position player, recruited from Ballan in the 1988 VFL Draft. He debuted in the 1990 AFL season but would make a total of only 19 senior appearances in six seasons playing at Richmond. In both 1993 and 1995 he didn't play a single AFL game.

Traded for Robert Powell, Francis joined Collingwood in 1996 and was able to play 10 games in his first year, followed by a career high 15 appearances in 1997. He participated in three Anzac Day clashes.

In 2008 he was appointed coach of Queensland club Redland. Although they finished with the wooden spoon in his first season in charge, Francis guided his club to the finals in 2009. He resigned as coach early in the 2011 season after some disappointing results.

At the moment, he teaches middle school science in Saigon South International School located in Ho Chi Minh City, Vietnam.
