= Steve Hargrave (footballer) =

Australian rules footballer

Personal information
- Full name: Stephen George Hargrave
- Born: 27 June 1954 (age 72)
- Original team: Perth (WAFL)

Playing career^{1}
Years	Club	Games (Goals)
1982	Footscray	2 (0)
- ^{1} Playing statistics correct to the end of 1984.

Stephen George "Steve" Hargrave (born 27 June 1954) is a former Australian rules footballer who played in the Victorian Football League (VFL) for Footscray and the West Australian National Football League (WANFL) for Perth.

He was a member of Perth's 1976 and 1977 WANFL premiership winning sides.

Hargrave's son, Ryan Hargrave has played over 200 games for the Bulldogs since 2002.

After retiring as a player, Hargrave was the coach of South Fremantle in 1991 and then moved into football administration. Working for the West Australian Football Commission (WAFC) he has been the General Manager of Umpiring and in 2014 is the General Manager of Pathways and Competitions.
