= Blake Campbell =

Australian rules footballer

Personal information
- Full name: Blake Campbell
- Born: 7 August 1982 (age 44)
- Original team: Tongala / Murray Bushrangers
- Draft: 31st overall, 2000 National draft
- Height: 180 cm (5 ft 11 in)
- Weight: 88 kg (194 lb)
- Position: Midfielder / Defender

Club information
- Current club: Retired
- Number: Carlton – 35

Playing career^{1}
Years	Club	Games (Goals)
2001–04	Carlton	11 (3)
- ^{1} Playing statistics correct to the end of 2003.

Blake Campbell (born 7 August 1982) is a former Australian rules footballer who played with Carlton in the Australian Football League.

He is the son of Des Campbell and brother of Brad Campbell, both of whom played for Melbourne.

== Sources ==
- Holmesby, Russell & Main, Jim (2009). The Encyclopedia of AFL Footballers. 8th ed. Melbourne: Bas Publishing.
