= Trisha Squires =

Australian youth leader

- Born: Trisha Silvers; 19 April 1981 (age 45); Melbourne, Victoria, Australia
- Other name: Trisha Broadbridge
- Occupation: Sports administrator
- Known for: Young Australian of the Year
- Spouses: Troy Broadbridge (m. 2004; died 2004) Jake Squires (m. 2015)

Trisha Squires (née Silvers; born 19 April 1981) is an Australian sports administrator and youth ambassador who is currently the head of AFLW, formally the Head of AFL Queensland. Squires became known in Australia for surviving the tsunami of 26 December 2004, in which her new husband Troy Broadbridge was killed.

== Biography ==
Squires joined the Reach Foundation, an Australian organisation that promotes youth self-esteem, in January 2000. She was the founder of the Reach Broadbridge Fund, established in 2005 to positively impact the lives of young people. In 2005, Squires wrote Beyond the Wave, which chronicles her life prior to, during and after the tsunami.

Squires was the 2006 recipient of the Young Australian of the Year Award, for her work in Thailand and with Australian youth. Later that year, she appeared on the Nine Network's Torvill and Dean's Dancing on Ice and had a brief relationship with Ryan Phelan. In 2007, Squires was the official ambassador for Melbourne's Moomba festival.

In 2013, Squires was appointed chief executive officer of Melbourne's St Kilda Youth Service.

In June 2016, Squires and her husband Jake opened a cafe in Sandy Bay called Nutrient Bar, which they sold in September 2017.

In February 2018, Squires was appointed chief executive officer of AFL Tasmania. In November 2020, Squires was appointed head of AFL Queensland.

== Personal life ==
Squires was known as Trisha Broadbridge from 2004 until approximately 2009. She then reverted to using her maiden name, Trisha Silvers.

In February 2015, Squires married fiancé Jake at a beach wedding ceremony in Brighton, Victoria.

In May 2016, Squires moved to Hobart with her husband. The pair have two daughters, Harper (born 2015) and Holly (born 2016).

Awards
Preceded by Khoa Do	Young Australian of the Year; 2006	Succeeded by Tania Major
