= Digby Morrell =

Australian rules footballer

Personal information
- Born: 10 October 1979 (age 47)
- Original team: West Perth (WAFL) Pingrup (Ongerup Football Association)
- Debut: 2001, Kangaroos vs. Richmond, at Docklands
- Height: 191 cm (6 ft 3 in)
- Weight: 97 kg (214 lb)

Playing career^{1}
Years	Club	Games (Goals)
2001–2003	Kangaroos	40 (47)
2004–2005	Carlton	32 (12)
Total		72 (59)
- ^{1} Playing statistics correct to the end of 2005.

Digby Morrell (born 10 October 1979) is a former Australian rules footballer who played with the Kangaroos and Carlton in the Australian Football League (AFL).

From Western Australia, Morrell played his early senior football for West Perth. His 44-game senior career for the Falcons spanned 1998–2000, and he was the club's leading goalkicker in 2000. At the age of 21, Morrell was recruited to the Australian Football League by the North Melbourne Football Club with its third round selection in the 2001 AFL Rookie Draft. As a forward he twice kicked five goals during his time with the Kangaroos. The first was in a losing cause against Sydney in 2002 and the other the following season in a drawn game against Brisbane.

After the 2003 season, Morrell was traded, along with David Teague, to the Carlton Football Club in exchange for Corey McKernan. He played 32 games for the Blues before being delisted at the end of 2005. He continued to play Victorian Football League (VFL) football with the Northern Bullants, Carlton's VFL-affiliate in 2006, and acted as playing assistant coach in 2007. In 2008, he shifted to the Box Hill Hawks, before retiring from playing at the end of the season. From 2009 until 2013, Morrell was the senior coach of the Strathmore Football Club in the Essendon District Football League, leading the club to the 2011 Premier Division premiership.from 2014 - 2018 he was the senior coach of the West Coburg Football Club, also in the EDFL. In September 2018 he was appointed new coach of the Pascoe Vale Football Club. In September 2023 Pascoe Vale announced that Morrell would no longer coach the Club and had been replaced by Leigh Tudor.

He currently teaches physical education and mathematics at the Parade College Bundoora campus in Melbourne.He also coaches the Parade A teams in ACC including year 7 and 9.
