= Michael Collica =

Australian rules footballer

Personal information
- Full name: Michael Frank Collica
- Born: 9 July 1977 (age 49)
- Original team: East Fremantle
- Draft: 20th overall, 1998 AFL draft
- Height: 185 cm (6 ft 1 in)
- Weight: 85 kg (187 lb)
- Position: Defender

Playing career^{1}
| Years | Club | Games (Goals) |
| 1999–2000 | Hawthorn | 30 (4) |
| 2001–2004 | West Coast | 50 (2) |
| Total | | 80 (6) |
- ^{1} Playing statistics correct to the end of 2004.

Michael Frank Collica (born 9 July 1977) is a former Australian rules footballer who played with Hawthorn and the West Coast Eagles in the Australian Football League (AFL).

Playing with East Fremantle in the WAFL, Collica was hampered by hamstring problems early in his career but had a good 1998 season when he was a half back flanker in their premiership winning team. Hawthorn picked him up with the 20th selection of the 1998 AFL draft and he played every game in his debut season, often matching up against taller forwards. He found himself out of favour with new coach Peter Schwab in 2000 and at the end of the year was traded to West Coast along with Richard Taylor, in return for pick 21 in the draft, which Hawthorn used on Nick Ries.

Under coach Ken Judge, who had been in charge of Hawthorn when he started his league career, Collica proved a durable player at half back. He was a consistent contributor in his first season in blue and gold. He played every game and finished runner-up to Ben Cousins in the club champion award. The following year he again played every game, including an elimination final against Essendon. He did not miss any of the 45 games which West Coast played in 2001 and 2002.

After an injury-interrupted start to 2003 Collica added only 5 more games to his total, with his 50th (and, ultimately, final) game for West Coast coming in a late-season win over Melbourne. He had another injury-plagued season in 2004 and was not able to force his way into the side. After being delisted following an injury plagued 2004 season, Collica continued his career at East Fremantle before retiring in 2006.

Collica played a total of 76 games and kicked 18 goals for East Fremantle between 1996 and 2006.
