= Robert Powell (footballer) =

Australian rules footballer

Personal information
- Full name: Robert Powell
- Born: 19 March 1976 (age 50)
- Original teams: North Heidelberg / Northern Knights
- Draft: 64th, 1994 AFL draft
- Height: 180 cm (5 ft 11 in)
- Weight: 79 kg (174 lb)
- Position: Forward

Playing career^{1}
Years	Club	Games (Goals)
1995	Collingwood	0 (0)
1996 – 2000	Richmond	56 (53)
2001	St Kilda	10 (7)
Total		66 (60)
- ^{1} Playing statistics correct to the end of 2001.

Career highlights
- AFL Rising Star nominee: 1997

Robert Powell (born 19 March 1976) is a former Australian rules footballer who played with Richmond Football Club and St Kilda in the Australian Football League (AFL).

After spending a year on Collingwood's list, where he played in the reserves, Powell was traded to Richmond in a swap for Matthew Francis.

Powell, a forward, had to wait until round 15 of the 1996 AFL season to make it into the Richmond seniors. On debut, against Melbourne, he was unable to kick a goal but instead registered five behinds. He still finished the year with 15 goals, five of which came in a win over Geelong.

The former North Heidelberg player started the 1997 season in Richmond's best 21 but again had his biggest impact in the second half of the year. He received a nomination for the 1997 AFL Rising Star award in round 20, having managed 25 disposals and two goals against North Melbourne.

He played 18 of a possible 22 games in 1998 and made a further 13 appearances in 1999. Troubled by a hip injury, he put together only four games in 2000 and was delisted at the end of the year. He nominated for the 2000 AFL draft and was picked up by St Kilda, with the 75th selection. Calf injuries plagued his time at St Kilda and he played just 10 AFL games.In 2002 Powell joined the Silvan Football Club, in the YVMDFL, playing an important role in guiding the Cats to a dominant premiership later that year.
