= James Davies (Australian footballer) =

Australian rules footballer

Personal information
- Full name: James Davies
- Born: 30 July 1982 (age 44)
- Original team: Xavier College
- Draft: 17th, 2000 AFL draft
- Height: 191 cm (6 ft 3 in)
- Weight: 84 kg (185 lb)

Playing career^{1}
Years	Club	Games (Goals)
2002–2003	Essendon	3 (1)
- ^{1} Playing statistics correct to the end of 2003.

James Davies (born 30 July 1982) is an Australian rules footballer who played with Essendon in the Australian Football League (AFL).

Davies was a surprise first round selection in the 2000 AFL draft, having not attended draft camp or competed in the Under 18s Championship. He made his AFL debut in the 2002 season, against Port Adelaide at Docklands. His two other appearances came in 2003. He was delisted at the end of the year but redrafted as a rookie in 2004. Not able to break into the senior team, he was again delisted.
