= Evan Hewitt =

Australian rules footballer

Personal information
- Full name: Evan Hewitt
- Born: 7 July 1978 (age 48)
- Original team: Subiaco
- Draft: 23rd, 1996 AFL draft
- Height: 193 cm (6 ft 4 in)
- Weight: 95 kg (209 lb)

Playing career^{1}
| Years | Club | Games (Goals) |
| 1997 – 2000 | North Melbourne | 33 (22) |
| 2001 – 2002 | Adelaide | 15 (6) |
| Total | | 48 (28) |
- ^{1} Playing statistics correct to the end of 2002.

Career highlights
- AFL Rising Star nominee: 1998

Evan Hewitt (born 7 July 1978) is a former Australian rules footballer who played with North Melbourne and Adelaide in the Australian Football League (AFL).

Hewitt arrived at North Melbourne from WAFL club Subiaco, having been recruited with the 23rd selection of the 1996 AFL draft. He was unable to hold down a key forward spot at North Melbourne as Wayne Carey and Corey McKernan were first choices. Hewitt, who spent some time in the ruck, did however manage to put together 19 games in 1998 and win an AFL Rising Star nomination. The following season he could only manage four games due to the strength of the Kangaroos team, which went on to claim their second premiership in four seasons.

The Kangaroos traded Hewitt to Adelaide in the 2000 AFL draft, for pick 23 Drew Petrie. He appeared in an elimination final with Adelaide in 2001 but after playing just two games in 2002 he was delisted.

Returning to Western Australia, Hewitt signed with South Fremantle in 2003 and had a four-year stint in the WAFL. He topped the club's goal-kicking in his last two seasons, with 53 goals in their premiership year of 2005 and 61 goals in 2006.
