= Xavier Clarke =

Australian rules footballer, born 1983

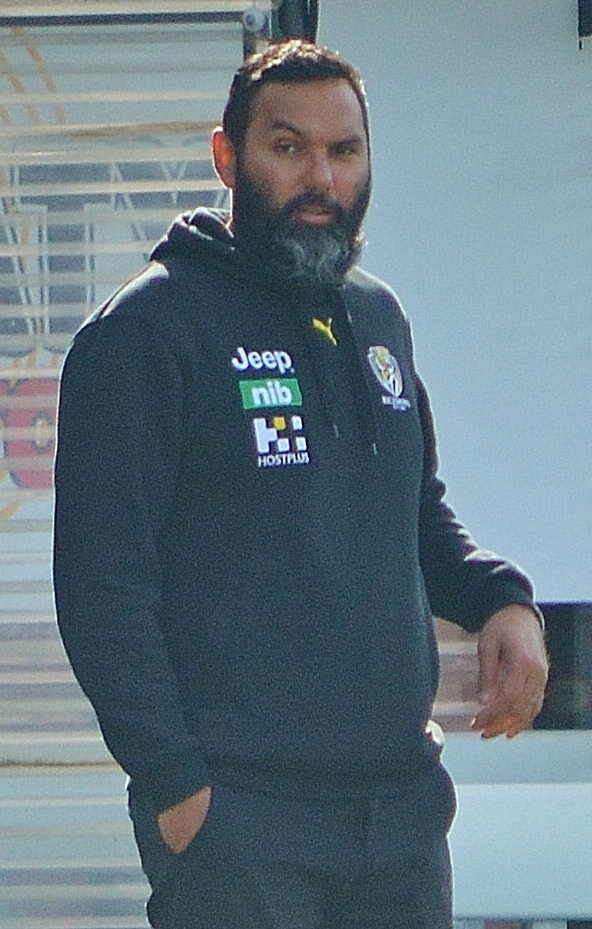
- Clarke as Richmond VFL head coach in July 2021

Personal information
- Full name: Xavier Clarke
- Born: 28 September 1983 (age 43); Darwin, Northern Territory, Australia
- Original team: St Mary's (NTFL)
- Draft: 1. 5, 2001 National Draft, St Kilda
- Height: 181 cm (5 ft 11 in)
- Weight: 78 kg (172 lb)
- Position: Midfielder

Playing career^{1}
Years	Club	Games (Goals)
2002–2009	St Kilda	105 (49)
2010–2011	Brisbane Lions	1 (0)
Total		106 (49)

Representative team honours
Years	Team	Games (Goals)
2007	Indigenous All-Stars	1
- ^{1} Playing statistics correct to the end of 2011.

Career highlights
- Playing: 2x Pre-Season Premiership Player: 2004, 2008; 2002 AFL Rising Star nominee; Coaching: NEAFL Premiership Coach: 2015; NEAFL Coach of the Year: 2014; NT Sports Awards Coach of the Year: 2016

Xavier Clarke (born 28 September 1983) is a former Australian rules football player who played for St Kilda and Brisbane Lions in the Australian Football League (AFL). He is now in his tenth year of assistant coaching at AFL level, having coached at Richmond and North Melbourne.

== Early life ==
Clarke has Indigenous Australian heritage and his ancestry can be traced to both the Larrakia people of the Top End of the Northern Territory, and the Marri Amu / Marri Tjevin people of the Daly River region of the Northern Territory. Originally from Darwin-based St Mary's Football Club in the Northern Territory Football League (NTFL), Clarke was a leading junior player and was tipped to be a first round choice at the 2001 AFL draft.

== Playing career ==
Clarke was selected by St Kilda with their first round choice, the fifth overall, in the 2001 AFL Draft was presented with the number 20 guernsey and made his senior AFL debut in the 2002 AFL season, where he was nominated as an AFL Rising Star. Clarke's brother Raphael was also drafted by St Kilda, as Clarke played 57 games during his first three seasons, taking over the number 3 guernsey from former St Kilda captain Nathan Burke when Burke retired at the end of the 2003 AFL season.

In 2005 Clarke he struggled in form and his season ended early when he injured his hamstring in Round 17 against Collingwood. Clarke continued to struggle with injuries for the rest of his AFL career and following the 2009 AFL season a deal was struck between St Kilda and Brisbane in which Clarke transferred to Brisbane in exchange for draft pick number 60 in the 2009 AFL draft.

Clarke played his only game for Brisbane in the Round 18, 2010 loss to Melbourne Football Club at Brisbane's home ground, the Gabba. Clarke suffered a recurrence of his hamstring injury in the first half, and while he was originally ruled out for a week, Clarke did not play again.

In 2011, Clarke almost completed a full preseason when he ruptured his anterior cruciate ligament in his right knee and, although offered a rookie list position by Brisbane, retired from football at the end of the 2011 season.

== Coaching career ==
Clarke became head coach of the NT Thunder in the NEAFL in 2014. He won the league's Coach of the Year award that season before taking them to a premiership in 2015. At the end of 2016 he joined Richmond as a Development Coach, going on to be named VFL coach (season cancelled due to Covid), and then assistant forwards AFL line coach over the 7 seasons he was there, during which time Richmond won 3 premierships. In 2024 Clarke applied to be Richmond's senior AFL coach and was shortlisted to the top 5 applicants. Clarke left Richmond in late 2024 to join the North Melbourne as an assistant line coach holding the forward line and offence portfolio for the 2025 and 2026 seasons. In 2025 Clarke was named the head coach of the reborn Indigenous All Stars team. His side went on to defeat Fremantle at Optus Stadium in Perth.

== Honours and achievements ==
- NEAFL Premiership Coach: 2015
- NEAFL Coach of the Year: 2014
- NT Sports Awards Coach of the Year: 2016
- NT Thunder Team of the Decade - Head Coach: 2018
- Indigenous Allstars Head Coach: 2025

== Other work ==
Clarke has also worked with the AFL and the AFL Players Association (AFLPA) in Indigenous engagement and was a founding director of the Unity Foundation which worked to provide housing and support for homeless Indigenous youth. Clarke also holds a director position of his company Goal Indigenous Services who create employment opportunities for Aboriginal and Torres Strait Islander people.
