= Jarrad Sundqvist =

Australian rules footballer

Personal information
- Full name: Jarrad Sundqvist
- Born: 11 December 1982 (age 43)
- Original team: Glenelg Football Club
- Height: 189 cm (6 ft 2 in)
- Weight: 91 kg (201 lb)

Playing career^{1}
Years	Club	Games (Goals)
2002–2003	Sydney Swans	9 (1)
- ^{1} Playing statistics correct to the end of 2003.

Jarrad Sundqvist (born 11 December 1982) is an Australian rules footballer who played for Sydney between 2002 and 2003.

He was drafted in the 2000 AFL draft with the 54th selection from the Glenelg Football Club in the South Australian National Football League. He played nine games in three seasons at the Swans before he was delisted at the end of the 2005 season, having missed the entire 2004 season due to a knee injury.
