= Ryan Hargrave =

Australian rules footballer, born 1981

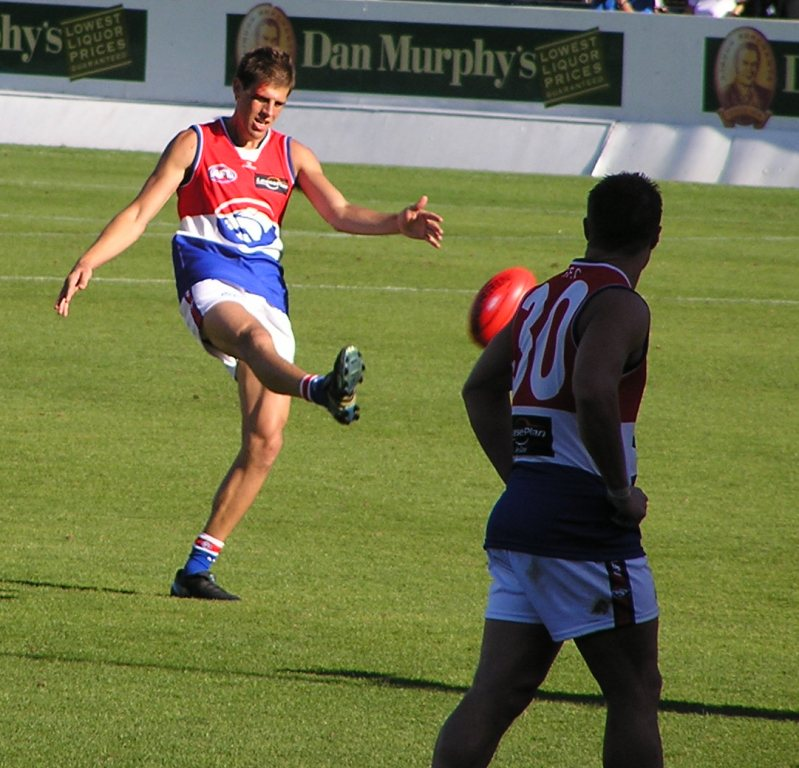

Personal information
- Full name: Ryan Colin Hargrave
- Born: 26 July 1981 (age 45); Melbourne, Victoria
- Original team: Perth (WAFL)
- Draft: No. 66, 1999 National Draft, Western Bulldogs
- Height: 190 cm (6 ft 3 in)
- Weight: 85 kg (187 lb)
- Position: Defender

Playing career^{1}
Years	Club	Games (Goals)
2002–2012	Western Bulldogs	203 (37)
- ^{1} Playing statistics correct to the end of Round 19, 2012.

Career highlights
- 2002 AFL Rising Star nominee

Ryan Hargrave (born 26 July 1981) is a former Australian rules footballer in the Australian Football League. He played for the Western Bulldogs.

He was a defender who was drafted with pick 66 in the 1999 AFL draft from the Perth Football Club. Though born in Melbourne, Hargrave's family returned to Perth WA when he was 1 year old. Throughout 2002 he grew and developed as a defender and became an essential part of the Western Bulldogs' defence. In the same year, Hargrave was nominated for the AFL Rising Star award. Hargrave also won the Western Bulldogs' Best First Year Player award in 2002. Hargrave was also selected in the Western Australia State of Origin team of 2005.

In 2003, Hargrave was fined $2,000 and suspended for three weeks by the tribunal after a retaliatory punch Heath Black during a melee against the St Kilda Saints.

After playing only five games in 2011 due to repeated foot and ankle injuries, it was thought that he would be delisted by the Bulldogs' new coach Brendan McCartney. However, he remained on the list and in 2012 he played eight of the first nine games, reaching his 200-game milestone in round ten.

He retired at the completion of the 2012 AFL season.

Hargrave's father, Steve Hargrave, played 3 games for the Bulldogs in 1982.
