= Sean O'Keeffe =

Australian rules footballer

Personal information
- Full name: Sean O'Keeffe
- Born: 10 May 1982 (age 44)
- Original team: Wangaratta Rovers / / Murray Bushrangers
- Draft: 46th overall, 2000 National Draft
- Height: 189 cm (6 ft 2 in)
- Weight: 87 kg (192 lb)
- Position: Half back flank

Club information
- Current club: Wangaratta Rovers
- Number: Carlton – 26

Playing career^{1}
Years	Club	Games (Goals)
2001–03	Carlton	6 (1)
- ^{1} Playing statistics correct to the end of 2003.

Sean O'Keeffe (born 10 May 1982) is a former Australian rules footballer who played with Carlton in the Australian Football League.

O'Keeffe played his junior football for Wangaratta Rovers in the Ovens & Murray Football League, and played TAC Cup football for the Murray Bushrangers. He was recruited to the AFL by the Carlton Football Club with its third round selection in the 2000 AFL draft. O'Keeffe managed only six senior games with Carlton in his three seasons at the club, and was de-listed at the end of 2003.

O'Keeffe has since had a distinguished football career at state and country level.

He played for Sandringham in the Victorian Football League from 2004 to 2005, winning premierships in both years and winning the club Best and Fairest and being named in the VFL Team of the Year in 2005.

In 2006, O'Keeffe moved to South Australia and played for Sturt in the SANFL until 2007. In 2008, he moved to Kalgoorlie, and played for Kalgoorlie Railways in the Goldfields Football League, winning the Mitchell Medal, as league best and fairest, in 2009.

In 2010, he returned to his former club Wangaratta Rovers, winning the club best and fairest in his first season back. O'Keeffe is still at Wangaratta Rovers, winning his second best & fairest in 2016 and played in their 2022 O&MFNL Reserves losing grand final side.

O'Keeffe, a qualified teacher, worked as an electrician when he first returned to Wangaratta.

== Sources ==
- Holmesby, Russell & Main, Jim (2009). The Encyclopedia of AFL Footballers. 8th ed. Melbourne: Bas Publishing.
- Sean O'Keeffe's profile at Blueseum
