= Kris Miller =

Australian rules footballer

Personal information
- Full name: Kristopher Thomas Miller
- Born: 29 September 1980 (age 46)
- Original team: Railways
- Debut: Round 1, 1999, East Fremantle vs. South Fremantle, at East Fremantle Oval
- Height: 181 cm (5 ft 11 in)
- Weight: 85 kg (187 lb)

Playing career^{1}
Years	Club	Games (Goals)
1999–2006	East Fremantle	153 (143)
2001–2002	West Coast Eagles	0 (0)
2007–2014	South Fremantle	150 (86)
- ^{1} Playing statistics correct to the end of 2013.

Career highlights
- East Fremantle Colts premiership team 1998; 2nd Lynn Medal 2001–04; Lynn Medal 2005; WJ Hughes Medal 2007, 2009, 2012; South Fremantle premiership team 2009

Kristopher Thomas "Kris" Miller (born 29 September 1980) is an Australian rules footballer currently playing with South Fremantle in the West Australian Football League (WAFL). He previously represented East Fremantle, and was also rookie-listed by the West Coast Eagles in the Australian Football League (AFL) for two seasons between 2001 and 2002. He played his 250th WAFL game on 26 June 2011, the first player since Marty Atkins in 2005. In 2012 he won his third best and fairest award at South Fremantle. He brought up his 300th WAFL game in the 2014 season.

Kris Miller is a dashing right hand top order batsmen for the Hay Park Cricket Club. A prolific scorer in the Bunbury Districts Cricket Association and over his career averaging 37 with a high score of 204 and 89 wickets at 18.
