= Luke Livingston =

Australian rules footballer

Personal information
- Born: 4 November 1982 (age 43)
- Original team: Kerang / Bendigo U18 (TAC Cup)
- Debut: Round 4, 21 April 2002, Carlton vs. Port Adelaide, at AAMI Stadium
- Height: 192 cm (6 ft 4 in)
- Weight: 97 kg (214 lb)

Playing career^{1}
Years	Club	Games (Goals)
2002–2006	Carlton	46 (2)
- ^{1} Playing statistics correct to the end of 2006.

Career highlights
- Carlton Pre-season premiership side 2005.

Luke Livingston (born 4 November 1982) is a former Australian rules footballer who played top-level football for the AFL's Carlton Football Club.

== Career ==
Livingston played his junior football for Kerang in the Central Murray Football League, and for the Bendigo Pioneers in the TAC Cup. He was drafted by Carlton with the No. 4 draft pick in the 2000 AFL draft. He made his AFL debut for Carlton in Round 4, 2002 against Port Adelaide.

"Livo" struggled for regular selection during his six seasons at Carlton. Although playing in the forward line as a junior, he was quickly shifted into the backline at Carlton, and it took him a long time to learn the craft. He played mainly for Carlton's VFL-affiliate, the Northern Bullants, over 2005 and 2006, and became a high quality defender at VFL level in a backline which was four goals better than any other in 2006. However, he found it difficult to adapt to AFL level, and played only five games in 2006.

Livingston was delisted by the Blues at the end of the 2006. He played for Port Melbourne in 2007 and 2008, and was selected at full back in the VFL representative side. In 2009, he returned to Kerang, and returned to the forward-line, kicking 103 goals for the season to be the league's top goalkicker. He moved back to Melbourne in 2010 and played for Maribyrnong Park in the EDFL until 2012, winning a premiership with the club in 2010. He returned to Kerang in 2013, playing parts of the next four seasons with the club.
