= Bernie Collins (Gaelic footballer) =

Irish Gaelic footballer

Personal information
- Native name: Bearnard Ó Coileáin (Irish)
- Born: 18 May 1981 (age 45) Castlehaven, County Cork, Ireland
- Occupation: Roofing contractor
- Height: 6 ft 3 in (191 cm)

Sport
- Sport: Gaelic football
- Position: Left corner-forward
Club
- Years: Club
- Castlehaven
Club titles
- Cork titles: 1
Inter-county*
Years	County	Apps (scores)
2000-2007	Cork	4 (0-01)
Inter-county titles
- Munster titles: 0
- All-Irelands: 0
- NFL: 0
- All Stars: 0
- *Inter County team apps and scores correct as of 22:49, 17 April 2020.

Bernard Collins (born 18 May 1981) is an Irish former Gaelic footballer who played for club side Castlehaven and at inter-county level with the Cork senior football team. He also spent two seasons playing Australian rules football with Western Bulldogs.

== Career ==
Collins first came to Gaelic football prominence with the Castlehaven team that won the County Under-21 Championship title in 1998. He subsequently progressed onto the club's senior team and added a senior medal to his collection in 2003. Collins also lined out in all grades with Cork. After Munster Championship success in the minor grade in 1999, he had a brief tenure with the under-21 team before being drafted onto the Cork senior team in 2000. Collins later spent a number of seasons playing Australian rules football with Western Bulldogs in Melbourne. He returned to Ireland afterwards, rejoined the Cork senior team and was a substitute when Cork were beaten by Kerry in the 2007 All-Ireland final.

== Honours ==
Castlehaven

- Cork Senior Football Championship: 2003
- Cork Under-21 Football Championship: 1998

Cork

- Munster Minor Football Championship: 1999
