= Scott Thornton (footballer) =

Australian rules footballer (born 1982)

Personal information
- Born: 11 September 1982 (age 44)
- Original team: Sandringham Dragons
- Debut: Round 8, 2002, Fremantle vs. Melbourne, at Subiaco Oval
- Height: 194 cm (6 ft 4 in)
- Weight: 89 kg (196 lb)

Playing career^{1}
Years	Club	Games (Goals)
2002–2009	Fremantle	88 (21)
- ^{1} Playing statistics correct to the end of 2009.

Scott Thornton (born 11 September 1982) is a former Australian rules footballer who played mainly as a defender for the Fremantle Football Club in the Australian Football League (AFL) between 2002 and 2009.

After being selected with the 66th selection in the 2000 AFL draft he made his AFL debut in 2002, playing just a single game that year. Apart from in 2005, when he played in all 22 games, injuries, illness (Crohn's disease) and poor form restricted him to just 66 games in his other seven seasons. At the end of the 2008 season Thornton re-signed with Fremantle for another two seasons.

When not selected for Fremantle, Thornton has played 69 games for South Fremantle in the WAFL, including three grand finals, their premiership victory in 2009 and losses in 2001 and 2006.

Thornton announced his retirement during the 2010 season after breaking his leg whilst playing for South Fremantle, having not played a game for Fremantle since Round 18, 2009.
