= Craig Willis (announcer) =

Australian announcer (born 1954)

Craig Willis (born 1954) is a former Australian announcer who has appeared as the voice of many of Network Ten / One HD and Seven Network's AFL Grand Final, Anzac Day and major Finals Broadcasts from the early 2000s to 2018. He is colloquially known as the 'voice of the AFL'.

== Career ==
Willis has also performed voiceovers at non-AFL major events, including the Melbourne Cup and is regarded as one of Australia's premier announcers. Willis is often a Master of Ceremonies and hosts the traditional Grand Final Breakfast, a fixture of the AFL grand final day. Additionally, he does voiceovers and is occasionally a fill in presenter on Melbourne radio station 3AW.

In 2000, he was the ground announcer at the Sydney Olympic Games, a role he also fulfilled at the Athens Olympics four years later.

Willis is also heavily involved in Tennis coverage and announces the players at the Australian Open. He also narrates the Fox Sports television show ATP Tennis and acted as a player announcer at the International Premier Tennis League (IPTL). In recent times, he has become the voice of Bank of Melbourne for directing customers through call queue options.
