= Jordan Doering =

Australian rules footballer

Personal information
- Full name: Jordan Doering
- Born: 14 September 1979 (age 47)
- Original team: Sandhurst / Bendigo Pioneers
- Height: 187 cm (6 ft 2 in)
- Weight: 87 kg (192 lb)
- Position: Half back flank

Playing career^{1}
Years	Club	Games (Goals)
2001–02	Carlton	18 (11)
- ^{1} Playing statistics correct to the end of 2002.

Jordan Doering (born 14 September 1979) is a former Australian rules footballer who played with Carlton in the Australian Football League. After being delisted by Carlton, Doering played in the Victorian Football League for the Tasmanian Devils and the Bendigo Bombers, before moving to Queensland to play for Labrador in the Queensland Australian Football League. In 2007 he joined Strathmore in the Essendon District Football League.

== Sources ==
- Holmesby, Russell & Main, Jim (2009). The Encyclopedia of AFL Footballers. 8th ed. Melbourne: Bas Publishing.
- Jordan Doering's playing statistics from AFL Tables
- Jordan Doering's profile at Blueseum
