= Jordan McMahon =

Australian rules football player (born 1983)

Personal information
- Full name: Jordan McMahon
- Born: 27 May 1983 (age 43); South Australia
- Original team: Glenelg (SANFL)
- Draft: 10th overall, 2000; Western Bulldogs
- Height: 187 cm (6 ft 2 in)
- Weight: 77 kg (170 lb)
- Position: Half back flank

Club information
- Current club: Glenelg Football Club

Playing career^{1}
Years	Club	Games (Goals)
2001–2007	Western Bulldogs	114 (37)
2008–2010	Richmond	34 (9)
Total		148 (46)
- ^{1} Playing statistics correct to the end of 2010.

Career highlights
- AFL Rising Star nominee 2002

Jordan McMahon (born 27 May 1983) is an Australian rules football player. McMahon, a native South Australian, was drafted from South Australian National Football League (SANFL) club Glenelg in the 2000 AFL draft as a first round selection (10th overall) by the Western Bulldogs. Playing as a running defender, McMahon had seven seasons at the Western Bulldogs, debuting in 2001 for four games. He began to establish himself in the Bulldogs defence with 15 games in 2002, including every game from Round 14–22. He was awarded an AFL Rising Star Nomination for his 25 possession game against the West Coast Eagles in round 18, 2002.

McMahon played 18 games in 2003 and established himself as an important member of the Bulldogs' defence, being assigned dangerous small forwards and providing run and rebound.

After seven seasons and 114 games for the Bulldogs McMahon was traded to Richmond for pick number 19 in the 2007 draft. Richmond coach Terry Wallace, his original coach at the Bulldogs, lured him to Richmond, keen to exploit his pace and kicking skill.

In 2008, McMahon made a solid debut for Richmond in their Round 1 clash against Carlton Football Club at the Melbourne Cricket Ground (MCG). His 22 disposals and seven marks helped Richmond get over the line by 30 points. In round 4 against Fremantle he played one of the best games of his career. McMahon was damaging as he kept finding the football across centre half back with 20 kicks and 12 handballs adding to a total of an outstanding career high of 32 disposals with a brilliant goal from outside 50. Against the odds, the Tigers crushed the Dockers at Subiaco Oval by 64 points. He played all 22 games in 2008 and had the club's most kicks, most handballs received, most rebounds from defensive 50 and came eighth in the Best and Fairest.

In 2009, he played 12 games. In round 18, he was the hero, kicking the match winning goal after the siren for Richmond against Melbourne. This goal has been cited as incidentally setting up a Richmond dynasty a decade later, as it meant Melbourne would end the year with the number one pick - and Richmond having the ability to draft Dustin Martin, the firebrand of Richmond's three 21st century premierships.

After Terry Wallace was replaced as coach by Damien Hardwick in 2010 McMahon was never selected and also suffered a leg injury. He was delisted by Richmond on 14 October 2010.

McMahon returned to Glenelg in 2011 after signing a two-year contract in December 2010.
