= Troy Broadbridge =

Australian rules footballer (1980–2004)

Personal information
- Full name: Troy Broadbridge
- Born: 5 October 1980; Melbourne, Victoria, Australia
- Died: 26 December 2004 (aged 24); Phi Phi Islands, Thailand
- Original team: Port Adelaide (SANFL)
- Height: 191 cm (6 ft 3 in)
- Weight: 90 kg (198 lb)

Playing career
Years	Club	Games (Goals)
2001–2004	Melbourne	40 (2)

Career highlights
- 2x VFL premiership player: 2000, 2004

Troy Broadbridge (5 October 1980 – 26 December 2004) was an Australian rules footballer with the Melbourne Football Club in the Australian Football League (AFL).

== AFL career ==
=== Melbourne career (2001–2004) ===
Broadbridge began his career as a defender with South Australian National Football League (SANFL) club Port Adelaide, the team his father Wayne played for, and was drafted by the Melbourne Football Club in the Australian Football League (AFL) in the 1999 rookie draft. He won the club's Most Improved Player award in 2001, and became a regular in the side, playing a total of 40 games over three seasons.

Broadbridge's first and last AFL games were both against Essendon – he made his debut in Round 8, 2001, in the teams' first meeting since the 2000 Grand Final, while his last league game was also against Essendon, in the 2004 elimination final. On both occasions, Melbourne lost. His final game of football at any level was in the 2004 premiership team of Melbourne's VFL-affiliate, Sandringham.

== Marriage and death ==
Broadbridge married Trisha Silvers on 18 December 2004. On 26 December, while spending their honeymoon in the Phi Phi Islands, Thailand, he drowned after being swept out to sea by the tsunami that followed the Indian Ocean earthquake, but Silvers survived. His father located his body in a Thai morgue on 3 January 2005. His funeral was held a few weeks later.

== Legacy ==
Trisha wrote a book about the events, Beyond The Wave, and was named as the 2006 Young Australian of the Year for her volunteer work for various charities, including building a school on Phi Phi named in Troy Broadbridge's honour.

In Melbourne's first match of the 2005 season, played against Essendon, the Demons all wore black armbands with number 20 sported on them in memory of Broadbridge. The Demons won that game and dedicated the win to him and his widow, Trisha. Broadbridge's number 20 guernsey was retired for the following two seasons (2005–2006), and it was revived in 2007 by new player Colin Garland.

Since 2007, the Troy Broadbridge Memorial Trophy has been awarded to any Melbourne-listed player that accumulates the most votes for the club's VFL affiliate.

Melbourne captain Max Gawn paid tribute to Broadbridge, among other deceased club identities, in a post-match interview upon the club winning the 2021 AFL Grand Final.
