= Paul Chambers (footballer) =

Australian rules footballer

Personal information
- Born: 23 June 1982 (age 44)
- Original teams: Melton South / Western U18 (TAC Cup)
- Debut: Round 4, 21 April 2002, Geelong vs. St Kilda, at Kardinia Park
- Height: 197 cm (6 ft 6 in)
- Weight: 99 kg (218 lb)

Playing career^{1}
| Years | Club | Games (Goals) |
| 2002–2005 | Geelong | 32(5) |
| 2006 | Sydney Swans | 12 (0) |
| Total | | 44 (5) |
- ^{1} Playing statistics correct to the end of 2006.

Paul Chambers (born 23 June 1982) is an Australian rules footballer with the Werribee Football Club in the Victorian Football League, who formerly played for the AFL's Geelong Football Club and Sydney Swans.

He was promoted off Geelong's rookie list in 2002 before making his debut in Round 4 of that year against St Kilda.

He was traded to the Sydney Swans at the end of the 2005 season in exchange for pick 35 (Stephen Owen). He made his debut for Sydney in Round 1, 2006 against Essendon.

After recording zero kicks in eight of the Swans' first 12 premiership round matches, Chambers was dropped to the club's reserves team. This lack of kicks led many of the fans and Sydney's major newspaper, The Sydney Morning Herald to give Chambers the nickname of 'Torture Chambers' and 'The Donut King'.

At Geelong he was referred to as 'Unco' and 'Sarge'. Paul Roos has referred to him as 'Sarge' in at least one media conference.

At the end of the 2006 season, Chambers retired from AFL football. He then joined the VFL's Werribee Tigers in 2007.
