= Mark Coughlan =

Australian rules footballer, born 1982

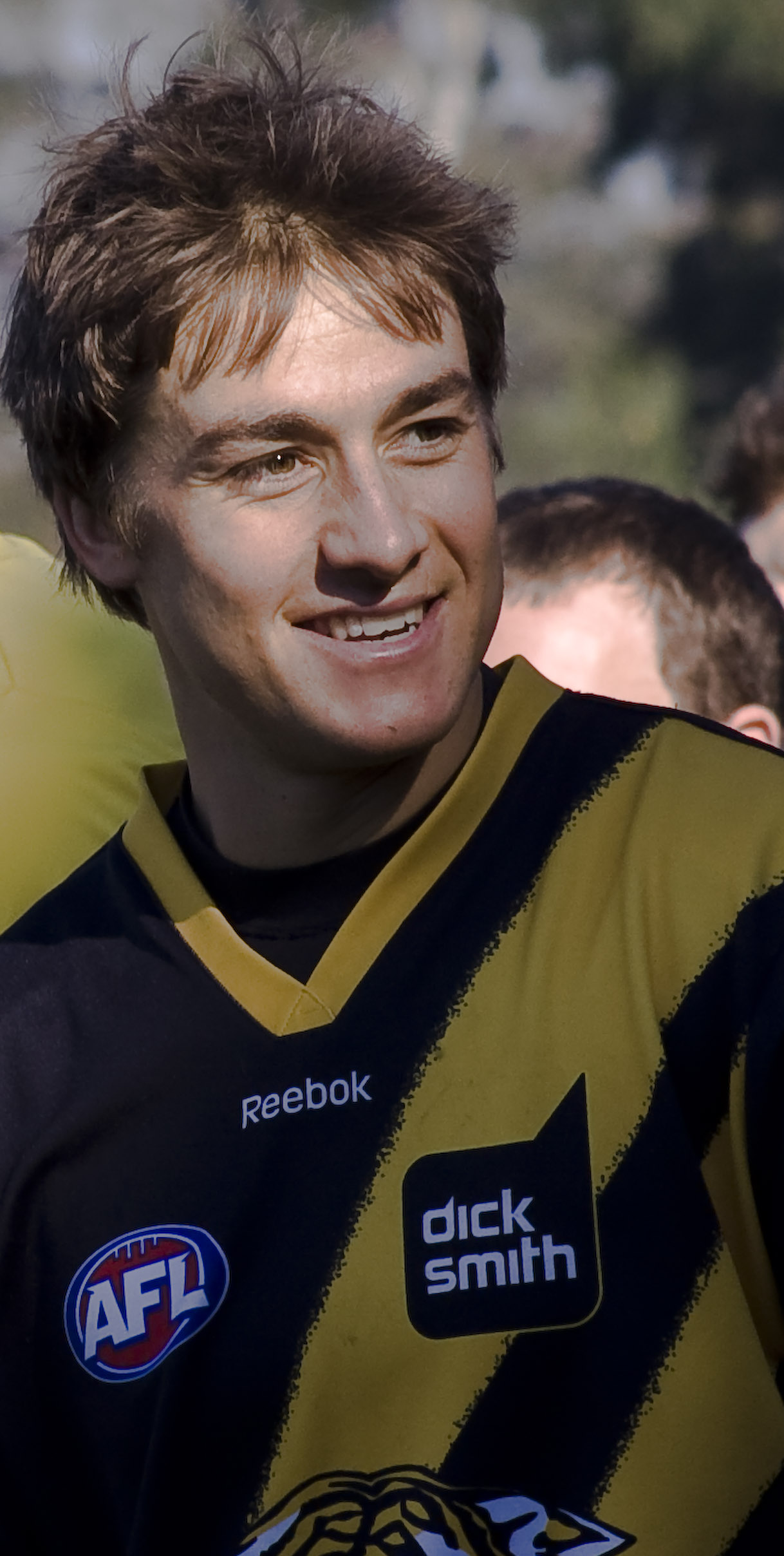
- Mark Coughlan

Personal information
- Full name: Mark Coughlan
- Nickname: Cogs
- Born: 20 April 1982 (age 44); Western Australia
- Original team: Perth
- Draft: 25th overall, 2000; Richmond
- Height: 186 cm (6 ft 1 in)
- Weight: 86 kg (190 lb)
- Position: Midfielder

Club information
- Current club: Richmond
- Number: 24

Playing career^{1}
Years	Club	Games (Goals)
2001–2009	Richmond	92 (39)
- ^{1} Playing statistics correct to the end of 2009.

Career highlights
- Richmond Best & Fairest 2003

Mark Coughlan (born 20 April 1982) is a former Australian rules footballer who played with the Richmond Football Club in the Australian Football League (AFL) from 2001 to 2009.

== Football career ==
=== Early career ===
Coughlan attended Wesley College, Perth and was selected in the 2000 National draft in the second round by Richmond at No. 25 overall. He made his AFL debut against the Geelong Cats in round 9 of the 2001 season.

=== Playing success ===
After winning the Jack Dyer Medal in 2003, Coughlan was hampered in 2004 by osteitis pubis, however he returned in 2005 and averaged more than 22 touches a game and finished the season ranked third in the competition for tackles (123) and sixth for handballs (235).

=== Injuries (2006–2009) ===
After a solid start to his 2006 campaign, Coughlan fell awkwardly and ripped the anterior cruciate ligament (ACL) inside one of his knees in round 12 against Hawthorn, ending his season. During the 2007 preseason he suffered a recurrence of his ACL knee injury, believed to have been related to slipping in the shower in December 2006. Unable to return from injury, he missed the whole of the 2007 season.

In 2008 due to ongoing hamstring injuries Coughlan was flown to Germany to receive radical treatment from controversial Dr. Hans-Wilhelm Müller-Wohlfahrt. The treatment was successful and Coughlan returned to Australia to play the remainder of the year with the Coburg Tigers, Richmond's VFL-affiliate.

=== Return to senior football (2009) ===
In early 2009 during the AFL pre-season, Coughlan suffered minor cartilage damage (a slight meniscus tear) in his knee during training and underwent minor arthroscopic surgery to correct the tear.

Coughlan made his much anticipated return for Richmond on 25 April 2009 (Anzac Day) in the club's first win of the 2009 season against North Melbourne. This marked the first time he made an appearance in the AFL since his injury in Round 12, 2006.

Following his successful comeback, columnist for The Age and Richmond teammate Nathan Brown described Coughlan as a very popular player and "the rarest individual I have ever met...in my 13 years of playing football".

=== Career end at Richmond ===
In the final round of the 2009 season on 28 August 2009, Coughlan was told before the game that he, along with Nathan Brown, would be delisted from the Tigers senior list and this would be his final game for the club.

=== Debut in the VAFA ===
On 11 April 2010, Coughlan made his debut with St Kevin's Old Boys in Premier B of the Victorian Amateur Football Association (VAFA). In a stunning display, he amassed 45 possessions as he joined forces with great friend and former Melbourne Demons player Luke Williams (51 senior AFL games) to help deliver a hard-fought 24-point victory over arch-rivals St Bernards.
