= Sam Cranage =

Australian rules footballer

Personal information
- Full name: Sam Cranage
- Born: 27 April 1979 (age 47)
- Original team: North Ballarat Rebels
- Height: 185 cm (6 ft 1 in)
- Weight: 76 kg (168 lb)

Club information
- Current club: Retired
- Number: St Kilda - 45; Carlton - 15

Playing career^{1}
| Years | Club | Games (Goals) |
| 1998 – 2000 | St Kilda | 8 (1) |
| 2002 | Carlton | 10 (2) |
| Total | | 18 (3) |
- ^{1} Playing statistics correct to the end of 2002.

Sam Cranage is a former Australian rules footballer who played with St Kilda and Carlton in the Australian Football League.

== Sources ==
- Holmesby, Russell & Main, Jim (2009). The Encyclopedia of AFL Footballers. 8th ed. Melbourne: Bas Publishing.
- Sam Cranage's playing statistics from AFL Tables
