= Daniel Wulf =

Australian rules footballer (born 1980)

Personal information
- Full name: Daniel Wulf
- Born: 19 May 1980 (age 46)
- Original team: Doveton / Dandenong Stingrays
- Draft: 16th selection, 1999 Pre-season Draft; 82nd overall, 2000 AFL draft
- Height: 188 cm (6 ft 2 in)
- Weight: 88 kg (194 lb)
- Position: Defender

Playing career^{1}
Years	Club	Games (Goals)
1999	Western Bulldogs	0 (0)
2001–2003	St Kilda	30 (17)
Total		30 (17)
- ^{1} Playing statistics correct to the end of 2003.

Daniel Wulf (born 19 May 1980) is an Australian rules footballer, who played for St Kilda Football Club in the Australian Football League (AFL).

Wulf originally played for Doveton and Dandenong Stingrays. He was recruited by the Western Bulldogs with the 16th selection in the 1999 Pre-season Draft. In his first season, Wulf had stress fractures in his foot and missed 10 weeks. The Bulldogs delisted Wulf at the end of 1999.

In 2000, Wulf played for East Burwood, but was able to be called up to play for St Kilda, but he did not play for St Kilda all season. At the end of 2000, Wulf was drafted by St Kilda with the 82nd selection in the 2000 AFL draft. One of Wulf made his AFL debut in round 14 of the 2001 season, against Brisbane. He played eight games in his first season for the Saints. In one game in 2002 when St Kilda played Sydney, Wulf had the chance to win the game at the 31 minute mark of the last quarter. He was running into an open goal and kick the ball into the post, tying the game at 56 all. At the end of 2002, Wulf had surgery on his ankle. After playing six games in 2003, he suffered a season-ending injury. After failing to play a senior match in 2004, Wulf was delisted by St Kilda at the end of the season.

After being delisted by St Kilda, Wulf signed with Swan Districts in the Western Australian Football League (WAFL) for the 2005 season. He played with Swan Districts from 2005 to 2008, winning the club's leading goalkicker award in 2007. In 2009 Wulf played in the B Grade Premiership for the Mt Lawley in the Western Australian Amateur Football League, beating Wembley and promoting Mt Lawley to A Grade within the WAAFL.
