= Nick Ries =

Australian rules footballer

Personal information
- Born: 14 July 1982 (age 44)
- Original team: Wesley College, Melbourne / Sandringham U/18
- Debut: 20 April 2002, Round 4, Hawthorn vs. Collingwood, at MCG
- Height: 182 cm (6 ft 0 in)
- Weight: 80 kg (176 lb)
- Position: midfield

Playing career^{1}
Years	Club	Games (Goals)
2002–2006	Hawthorn	81 (18)
- ^{1} Playing statistics correct to the end of 2006.

Career highlights
- AFL Rising Star nominee: 2002; VFL premiership player: 2001

Nick Ries (born 14 July 1982) is a former Australian rules footballer who played as a midfielder for the Hawthorn Football Club in the Australian Football League (AFL). He was drafted at pick 21 in the 2000 AFL draft.

From 2002 to 2004 he played 60 out of a possible 66 matches. He was nominated for the AFL Rising Star award in Round 17 of the 2002 AFL season.

He was educated at Wesley College, Melbourne.
