= Shane Birss =

Australian rules football player

Personal information
- Born: 11 March 1983 (age 43)
- Original team: Sale / Gippsland U18
- Debut: Round 2, 2002, Western Bulldogs vs. Kangaroos, at Docklands Stadium
- Height: 183 cm (6 ft 0 in)
- Weight: 80 kg (176 lb)

Playing career
Years	Club	Games (Goals)
2002–2006	Western Bulldogs	51 (20)
2007–2008	St Kilda	20 (13)
Total		71 (33)

Career highlights
- St Kilda pre-season premiership side 2008

Shane Birss (born 11 March 1983) is an Australian rules football player.

Birss played for both St Kilda and the Western Bulldogs in the Australian Football League (AFL). He was drafted with the 26th pick by the Western Bulldogs from the Gippsland Under 18s in the 2000 AFL draft. Debuting in 2002, Birss was unable to play consistently to establish himself in the Bulldogs' senior side, playing 51 games and kicking 20 goals in five seasons.

Birss was traded to St Kilda during the 2006 Trade period for their fourth Round draft selection at Number 59. He played two seasons for St Kilda before being delisted at the end of the 2008 AFL season. Birss was then recruited by South Australian Football League (SANFL) club West Adelaide where he went on play more than 100 games.
