= Chris Hyde =

Australian rules footballer

Personal information
- Full name: Chris Hyde
- Born: 9 August 1982 (age 44)
- Original teams: Barooga, Murray U18
- Height: 186 cm (6 ft 1 in)
- Weight: 80 kg (176 lb)

Playing career^{1}
Years	Club	Games (Goals)
2002–2008	Richmond	93 (39)
2009–2021	Albury	210 (284)
- ^{1} Playing statistics correct to the end of 2008.

Chris Hyde (born 9 August 1982) is a former Australian rules football player for the Richmond Football Club.

He retired as an AFL player in 2008 after playing 93 games, and now works for the NSW Game Council as the Game Manager for the Snowy/South East region.

He continues to play football for the Albury Football Club Tigers in the Ovens & Murray Football League.

Hyde played in ten consecutive O&MFNL senior football grand finals with Albury in - 2009, 2010, 2011, 2012, 2013, 2014, 2015, 2016, 2017 & 2018 O&MFL premierships (bold print - premierships years).

Hyde won the 2017 O&MFL Best & Fairest, the Morris Medal and was inducted into their Hall of Fame in 2024.
