= Callan Beasy =

Australian rules footballer

Personal information
- Born: 19 March 1982 (age 44)
- Original team: Swan Hill
- Height: 190 cm (6 ft 3 in)
- Weight: 91 kg (201 lb)

Playing career^{1}
Years	Club	Games (Goals)
2002–2004	Carlton	13 (6)
- ^{1} Playing statistics correct to the end of 2004.

Callan Beasy (born 19 March 1982) is a former Australian rules footballer who played for Carlton.

Beasy was drafted with the 61st selection in the 2000 AFL draft, but did not make his AFL debut until late in 2002 when Carlton suffered from a high number of injuries. He played in six of the last seven games of the 2003 season and had high hopes for the 2004 season, however he was delisted after the 2004 season after a disappointing three games. He joined the Bendigo Bombers for the 2005 and 2006 seasons. before returning to the Swan Hill Football Club, as playing-coach in 2007. Beasy is still playing at the club as of 2015; he won premierships with the club in 2008 and 2011 as playing-coach.
