= Max Tetley =

Australian rules footballer and coach

Personal information
- Full name: Maxwell Joseph Tetley
- Born: 22 April 1909; Fremantle, Western Australia
- Died: 9 February 1997 (aged 87); Mount Hawthorn, Western Australia
- Original team: North Fremantle amateurs
- Positions: Full back Centre half-back

Playing career^{1}
Years	Club	Games (Goals)
1931–1941	West Perth	210 (0)
- ^{1} Playing statistics correct to the end of 1941.

Career highlights
- West Perth premiership side 1932, 1934, 1935; West Perth best and fairest 1932

Maxwell Joseph Tetley (22 April 1909 – 9 February 1997) was an Australian rules footballer who played for the West Perth Football Club in the Western Australian National Football League (WANFL). A defender, he played 210 games for the club between the 1931 and 1941 seasons, playing in the team’s 1932, 1934, 1935 and 1941 premiership sides.

Tetley played a trial match for East Fremantle in 1930 after being recruited from amateur club North Fremantle, but when Cardinals president Alec Breckler offered Tetley employment and he was cleared immediately. Tetley wasted no time establishing himself, for he was named West Perth’s best first-year player in 1931 and a key member of their drought-breaking premiership team the following season, when he also won his only Breckler Medal for the club’s fairest-and-best.

In the following season, Tetley played for Western Australia in the 1933 Sydney Carnival, and was to play fourteen games for his State over the following six seasons. His reputation as a hard and strong defender grew over the years, and Tetley was a crucial factor in holding East Fremantle and Subiaco to extremely modest scores in the 1934 and 1935 Grand Finals, which produced as of 2014 the Cardinals’ only back-to-back premierships.

Although the following five seasons were extremely lean for the club, Tetley maintained his reputation as a tough defender so well that he captained the State team in 1937 and 1938, besides being captain-coach of the Cardinals in 1938 and 1939. However, Tetley’s two years in charge of West Perth were an unmitigated disaster, with the Cardinals winning a total of four matches and finishing a clear last both seasons – in the process suffering the equal-worst losing streak in WANFL history. The club suffered severely from the retirement of Ted Flemming and the loss of future Essendon champion Wally Buttsworth, along with a crippling run of injuries. Tetley continued to play in 1940 under future politician Ross Hutchinson, but like his contemporary Tyson contemplated retirement in 1941 before staying on and helping a Cardinal team rebuilt with young players like Stan Heal, Bill Kingsbury and “Spike” Pola to a surprise premiership win over East Fremantle.

With the WANFL competition restricted to players under eighteen from 1942 to 1944, Tetley was forced into retirement and, unlike Tyson and a number of other pre-war stars, did not make any comeback after the war.

Tetley died in Mount Hawthorn, a northern suburb of Perth, in 1997, aged 87. In 2004, he was an inaugural member of the Western Australian Football Hall of Fame.
