= Harold Boyd =

Harold Boyd may refer to:

- Harold Boyd (footballer, born 1900) (1900–1990), Australian rules footballer for West Perth
- Harold Boyd (footballer, born 1913) (1913–1971), Australian rules footballer for Fitzroy

== See also ==
- Harry Boyd
