= Keith Hough =

Australian rules footballer

Personal information
- Full name: Keith Alan Hough
- Born: 17 March 1908; Bunbury, Western Australia
- Died: 13 July 1958 (aged 50); Floreat, Western Australia
- Original team: Pastimes

Playing career^{1}
Years	Club	Games (Goals)
1928–1930, 1932–1936	Claremont	120 (7)
- ^{1} Playing statistics correct to the end of 1936.

Keith Alan Hough (17 March 1908 – 13 July 1958) was an Australian rules footballer who played 120 games for Claremont in the West Australian National Football League (WANFL) during the late 1920s and 1930s. He missed the 1931 season because South Melbourne signed him, but the WANFL consistently refused to clear him.

A half back flanker from Bunbury, Hough made his league debut in the 1928 season with Claremont, who at the time were called Claremont-Cottesloe. He won the first of his two best and fairest awards that year and took out the other in the 1932 WANFL season, the same season he became Claremont's first Sandover Medallist with what was then a record number of votes. Hough had come close to winning the Sandover two years earlier when he finished second to Ted Flemming.
