= Harry Price (cricketer) =

Australian cricketer (1922–1991)

Personal information
- Full name: Reuben Henry Price
- Born: 27 April 1922; London, England
- Died: 26 February 1991 (aged 68); Perth, Western Australia
- Batting: Left-handed
- Bowling: Left-arm fast-medium
- Role: Bowler

Domestic team information
- Years: Team
- 1949/50–1955/56: Western Australia

Career statistics
Competition	First-class
Matches	26
Runs scored	378
Batting average	13.50
100s/50s	0/0
Top score	33
Balls bowled	5,807
Wickets	93
Bowling average	27.39
5 wickets in innings	4
10 wickets in match	1
Best bowling	5/49
Catches/stumpings	11/–
- Source: CricketArchive, 15 November 2022

Reuben Henry "Harry" Price (27 April 1922 – 26 February 1991) was an Australian cricketer who played for Western Australia in the Sheffield Shield.

Price was born in London in 1922, with his family emigrating to Australia a few years later, settling in Margaret River, Western Australia. One of his younger brothers, Wally Price, played Australian rules football for West Perth, and represented Western Australia at football.

Price, who usually opening the bowling, was a left-arm fast-medium bowler and one of Western Australia's best from the 1950s. He was at his peak in the 1950/51 Sheffield Shield season, when he took 24 wickets at 18.41, which was twice as many as the state's next best Charlie Puckett and equal fifth most by any bowler that summer.

In Western Australia's home match against Queensland that season, Price had a large role in a tense 19 runs win, despite coming into the side due to an injury. He took 5 for 68 in the first innings, with the fifth wicket coming from a hit wicket. Earlier in the innings, off his first three overs of the match, Price had three catches dropped off his bowling. Chasing 229 for victory, Queensland were well placed at 5–154, albeit with only 80 minutes remaining on the final day. After taking the new ball, Price dismissed all-rounder Colin McCool and wicket-keeper Ernest Toovey off successive deliveries. Queensland batsman Lawrence Chapman survived the hattrick but was trapped leg before wicket the very next ball to give Price a third wicket in the space of four balls. Price would secure the win soon after, dismissing Mick Raymer with just 16 minutes to spare, giving him a 10 wicket haul. It had been just his third first-class match for Western Australia and was the performance that secured a spot his spot in the team.

Some of his best performances came against touring international teams. In 1951/52 took seven wickets in a first-class match against the West Indies, with three in the first innings and four in the second. The following season he opened the bowling against South Africa and returned match figures of 6 for 94.

Price was a prolific wicket taker at Western Australian Grade Cricket level with East Perth/Perth Cricket Club. He took 387 wickets from 1946 to 1955 and played a starring role in the 1948/49 Premiership under Captain Keith Carmody. taking 13 North Perth wickets for 58 runs in the final at the WACA Ground. Price was named in the Perth Cricket Club Team of the Century at the club 150th celebration function in 2012.

He was also a Western Australian state representative as an Australian rules footballer, which he played for Claremont in the West Australian National Football League. A defender, he featured in both of Western Australia's 1949 wins over South Australia, from the back pocket.

His early cricket career had been interrupted by World War II, during which time he served as a corporal on the island of Morotai in the Dutch East Indies.
