= Ted Flemming =

Ted Flemming may refer to:

- Ted Flemming (politician), Canadian politician
- Ted Flemming (footballer) (born 1902), Australian rules footballer
