= Jack McDiarmid =

Australian rules footballer (1903–1974)

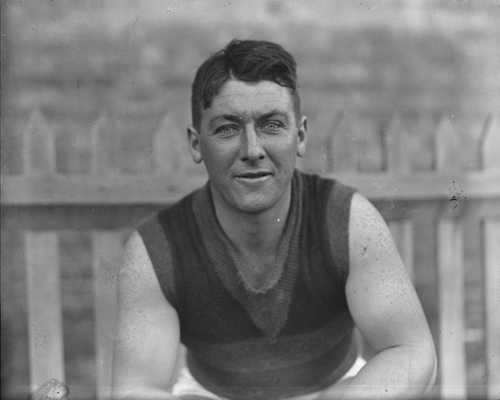

Personal information
- Full name: John Frederick Dawes McDiarmid
- Nickname: "Fat"
- Born: 3 October 1903; Perth, Western Australia
- Died: 8 October 1974 (aged 71); Perth, Western Australia
- Original team: West Perth juniors
- Height: 5 ft 11 in (180 cm)
- Weight: 15 st 10 lb (100 kg; 220 lb)
- Position: Ruckman

Playing career^{1}
Years	Club	Games (Goals)
1923–34	West Perth	177 (73)
1935	Claremont:	6 (2)
Total		183 (75)

Representative team honours
Years	Team	Games (Goals)
1924–30	Western Australia	25 (26)
- ^{1} Playing statistics correct to the end of 1935.

Career highlights
- West Perth captain 1928; West Perth premiership side 1932, 1934; West Perth Team of the Century (2000); West Australian Football Hall of Fame (2004)

John Frederick Dawes McDiarmid (3 October 1903 – 10 August 1974) was an Australian rules footballer who played for the West Perth and Claremont Football Clubs in the Western Australian National Football League (WANFL). He was inducted into the West Australian Football Hall of Fame in 2004.

== Family ==
McDiarmid was the oldest of four brothers who each played football in Western Australia. His brother, Norman, played senior football for West Perth and the state team, and the two other brothers, Robert and Ron, played junior and reserves football for West Perth. Their father, Frederick McDiarmid, had played for South Adelaide in the South Australian Football Association (SAFA), and emigrated to Western Australia in 1900.

== Football ==
After beginning with West Perth's affiliated junior club in the Western Australian Football Association, McDiarmid debuted with the senior West Perth side in 1923, and made an immediate impact.

He played his first match for Western Australia against in the 1924 Australasian Football Carnival in Hobart. He also played in the 1927 and 1930 Carnivals, held in Melbourne and Adelaide, respectively. McDiarmid was made vice-captain of Western Australia for the 1930 carnival, and was again named vice-captain for the 1933 Carnival, held in Sydney, but missed a large portion of the 1933 season due to a knee injury, and was unable to take part.

He announced his retirement at the end of the 1934 season, but the following season, transferred to Claremont, where he played six games before retiring again. In total, McDiarmid played 183 games of senior WAFL football, 177 for West Perth and six for Claremont, as well as representing his state on 25 occasions.

McDiarmid was one of the largest WAFL players at the time, in terms of both height and size, standing just under 6 feet (1.8 m), and weighing 15 stone 10 pounds (100 kg) at his peak. In 1929, The West Australian described McDiarmid as "the most rugged and effective follower in the league" and the "ideal heavyweight footballer", describing his "massive shoulders and chest and footballer's thighs". At West Perth, he often partnered with Don Marinko in the ruck, with Marinko serving as "tap" ruckman and McDiarmid as ruck "shepherd". The two also partnered in state matches, on occasion.

== Recognition ==
In October 2000, McDiarmid was named in West Perth's Team of the Century. In 2004, he was an inaugural inductee into the West Australian Football Hall of Fame.

== See also ==
- 1927 Melbourne Carnival
