= Wally Price =

Australian rules footballer (1926–2021)

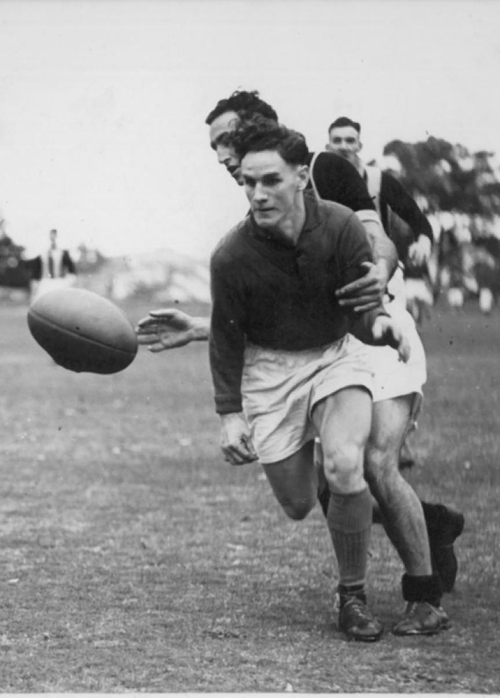

Personal information
- Full name: Walter John Price
- Born: 2 June 1926; Margaret River, Western Australia
- Died: 17 June 2021 (aged 95); Mindarie, Western Australia
- Position: Back pocket

Playing career^{1}
Years	Club	Games (Goals)
1942–54	West Perth	256 (4)

Representative team honours
Years	Team	Games (Goals)
1947–53	Western Australia	12 (0)

Umpiring career
Years	League	Role
1960–1964	WANFL	Field umpire (country matches)
- ^{1} Playing statistics correct to the end of 1954.

Career highlights
- West Perth premiership side 1942, 1949, 1951; West Perth best and fairest 1952; West Perth life member (1954); West Perth Team of the Century (2000); West Australian Football Hall of Fame (2010)

Walter John "Wally" Price (2 June 1926 – 17 June 2021) was an Australian rules footballer who played for the West Perth Football Club in the Western Australian National Football League (WANFL). Born in Margaret River, Western Australia, Price played 256 games for the club between 1942 and 1954, mainly as a back pocket. Having played in premierships in 1942, 1949, and 1951, he also played 12 interstate matches for Western Australia, and was inducted into the West Australian Football Hall of Fame in 2010.

== Career ==
Price was born in Margaret River, Western Australia, the third of five sons (and the first born in Australia) born to English migrant parents. One of his older brothers, Harry Price, played for Claremont, and represented Western Australia at both football and cricket. Originally playing in the Metropolitan Junior Football Association (MJFA), Price debuted for West Perth in the age-restricted war-time competition in 1942, at the age of 16, and played in a premiership in his first season. He made his interstate debut for Western Australia at the 1947 Australian National Football Carnival, held in Hobart, and would go on to play 12 matches for the state, including the 1953 Carnival, held in Adelaide. Playing almost exclusively as a back pocket, Price played in premiership sides with West Perth in 1949 and 1951, and was awarded the Breckler Medal as the club's best and fairest player during the 1952 season.

Price was made a life member of the West Perth Football Club in 1954, and presented with a medal by Stan Heal. At the end of the 1954 season, Price left West Perth to accept a position as captain-coach of the Griffith Football Club in the South-Western District Football League (SWDFL), based in Griffith, New South Wales. On his return to Western Australia, he was appointed coach of West Perth's reserves team, a position which he held for two seasons, from 1958 to 1959. Price joined the WANFL's umpiring panel in 1960, serving as an umpire in country football matches for four years. Overall, Price played 256 games for West Perth, at the time a club record, and kicked four goals. In October 2000, Price was named in the back pocket in West Perth's "Team of the Century". He was inducted into the West Australian Football Hall of Fame in March 2010. After the death of Spike Pola in January 2012, Price was West Perth's oldest living life member.

Price died on 17 June 2021, at the age of 95.
