= Ron Doig Sr. =

Australian sportsman

Personal information
- Full name: Ronald Oldham Doig
- Born: 10 July 1909; Fremantle, Western Australia
- Died: 17 September 1932 (aged 23); Beaconsfield, Western Australia

Playing career^{1}
Years	Club	Games (Goals)
1927–32	South Fremantle	99
- ^{1} Playing statistics correct to the end of 1932.

Ronald Oldham Doig (10 July 1909 – 17 September 1932) was an Australian sportsman who played Australian rules football for South Fremantle in the West Australian Football League (WAFL) and first-class cricket with Western Australia.

A member of the famous Doig sporting family of Fremantle, Ron was a first cousin of Australian rules footballer George Doig. He made his debut for South Fremantle at the age of just 17 in 1927 and by 1930 was representing Western Australia at interstate football. He was captain of South Fremantle in 1931 and captain-coach in 1932.

On the cricket field, Doig was a right-arm fast-medium bowler and right-handed batsman. He made three first-class cricket appearances for Western Australia, the first of which came in 1926/27 against South Australia. Doig did not bowl and instead played as a top order batsman, making scores of eight and five.

He had to wait until 1931 to play again at first-class level, with his opportunity coming when South Africa toured. Batting at four, he failed to impress with the bat but took what would be the only wicket of his first-class career, bowling opener Herbie Taylor. When South Africa returned to Perth five months later, Doig made his only other first-class appearance but he did not affect the game.

In the finals of the 1932 WANFL season, Doig, who was now captain-coach of South Fremantle, was injured during a match against East Perth. He died from his injuries later that night after suffering from convulsions. The coroner investigated the death and declared it was an accidental death, but was critical of the lack of control by the umpire, the roughness of the play and the fact that the medical staff did not have the right to order players from the field.

An outpatient building at Fremantle Hospital was built in his honour by "his fellow sportsmen and sincere admirers", with the foundation stone unveiled by Alick McCallum on 8 October 1933.
