= Ross Hutchinson =

Australian rules footballer, coach and politician

The Honourable Sir Ross Hutchinson DFC
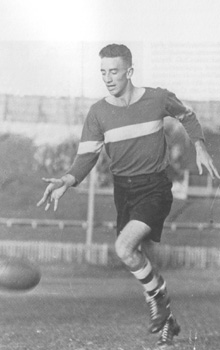
- Hutchinson playing Australian rules football

21st Speaker of the Legislative Assembly of Western Australia
- In office 22 May 1974 – 19 February 1977
- Preceded by: Daniel Norton
- Succeeded by: Ian Thompson

Member of the Western Australian Parliament for Cottesloe
- In office 25 March 1950 – 19 February 1977
- Preceded by: New creation
- Succeeded by: Bill Hassell

Personal details
- Born: 10 September 1914 Worsley, Western Australia
- Died: 18 December 1999 (aged 85) North Cottesloe, Western Australia
- Citizenship: Australian
- Party: Liberal and Country League; Liberal Party
- Spouse: Amy
- Children: Ross, Gail
- Occupation: Teacher
- Awards: Distinguished Flying Cross (DFC)

Military service
- Allegiance: Australia
- Branch/service: Royal Australian Air Force
- Years of service: 1942–46
- Rank: Flight Lieutenant
- Unit: 96 Squadron
Australian rules football career
Personal information
- Position: Utility
Playing career^{1}
Years	Club	Games (Goals)
1935–39	East Fremantle	93 (14)
1946	West Perth	17 (28)
1947	South Fremantle	18 (5)
Total		128 (47)
Representative team honours
Years	Team	Games (Goals)
1936–39	Western Australia	6 (0)
Coaching career
Years	Club	Games (W–L–D)
1937–39	East Fremantle	70 (48–19–3)
1941–42 1946	West Perth	41 (31–10–0)
1947–49	South Fremantle	62 (48–14–0)
- ^{1} Playing statistics correct to the end of 1949.

Sir Ross Hutchinson, DFC (10 September 1914 – 18 December 1999) was an Australian rules footballer, coach and politician. He played for and coached East Fremantle, West Perth and South Fremantle in the West Australian National Football League (WANFL) before spending 27 years as a member of the Western Australian Legislative Assembly.

== Early life ==
Hutchinson was born in Worsley in 1914. He was educated at Deanmill before attending Wesley College in Perth from the age of 14.

== Football career ==
Hutchinson was used in a variety of positions during his football career including centreman, half back and half forward. In his first two seasons he won the Lynn Medal as East Fremantle's fairest and best player. He captain-coached the club to a premiership in 1937, as a half back flanker. The following two seasons ended in grand final losses, both to Claremont. In 1939 he was captain-coach of the Western Australian interstate football team which took on Victoria.

Hutchinson sought a clearance to West Perth for the 1940 season but, because it wasn't granted by East Fremantle, he had to sit out the entire season. He was able to coach West Perth in 1941, and not only steered them to that year's premiership but also to the 1942 'under-age' premiership.

When he returned to coaching in 1946, following his war service, he had received the clearance he sought, which meant that he was able to take the field for West Perth and steer the club to a losing grand final.

He made the move to South Fremantle in 1947 and was captain-coach of their premiership team that year, kicking two goals in the Grand Final from the half forward flank. In 1948 he again coached the club to a premiership, but he had retired as a player and it was only in an off-field capacity. Hutchinson continued as non playing coach in 1949, his final season. South Fremantle finished in third position, the only time he failed to coach a WANFL club into the grand final.

Hutchinson is one of only two people to have coached three separate WA(N)FL clubs to premierships; John Todd was the other. He steered each of the clubs to premierships in his very first year. He coached 176 WANFL games in total, 72.4% of which were won.

== War service ==
During the Second World War he fought with the Royal Australian Air Force in Europe as a pilot. Hutchinson was awarded a Distinguished Flying Cross (DFC) in 1944 after a bombing run on an oil refinery in Sterkrade was interrupted when his aircraft was hit by anti-aircraft fire. He was able to return the aircraft to Britain, while managing to take valuable photographs of the intended target.

== Political career ==
In 1950 Hutchinson successfully ran for the newly created seat of Cottesloe in the Western Australian Legislative Assembly, representing the Liberal and Country League (later the Liberal Party), and held the seat until his retirement in 1977. After David Brand led the Liberals to victory in 1959, Hutchinson was named Chief Secretary, Minister for Health and Minister for Fisheries, posts he held in both the Brand-Watts and Brand-Nalder Ministries. From May 1974 to February 1977, Hutchinson was speaker of the Western Australian Legislative Assembly.

== Honours ==
He was knighted for services to the state of Western Australia when he retired from politics.

His contribution to Australian rules football was also honoured, in 2004, when he was inducted into the West Australian Football Hall of Fame.

Western Australian Legislative Assembly
New seat	Member for Cottesloe; 1950–1977	Succeeded by Bill Hassell
Preceded by Daniel Norton	Speaker of the Western Australian Legislative Assembly; 1974–1977	Succeeded by Ian Thompson
