= Spike Pola =

Australian rules footballer

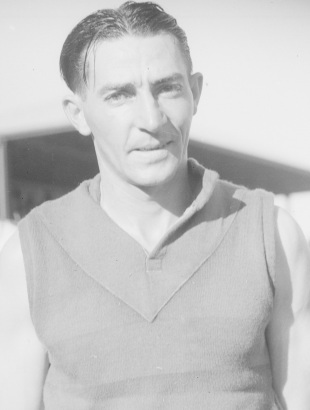

Personal information
- Full name: Jack Stephen Pola
- Nickname: Spike
- Born: 16 November 1914; Fremantle, Western Australia
- Died: 6 January 2012 (aged 97); Mount Lawley, Western Australia
- Original team: Mount Hawthorn (MJFA)
- Height: 5 ft 8 in (173 cm)
- Weight: 10 st 3 lb (65 kg; 143 lb)
- Position: Rover

Playing career
Years	Club	Games (Goals)
1935–47	West Perth	152 (203)

Career highlights
- West Perth premiership side 1941; West Perth best and fairest 1941; West Perth captain 1941, 1945; West Perth life member

Jack Stephen "Spike" Pola (born Giovanni Stefano Pola; 16 November 1914 – 6 January 2012) was an Australian rules footballer who played for the West Perth Football Club in the Western Australian National Football League (WANFL).

Born in Fremantle in 1914, Pola anglicised his name in 1928 on the advice of his mother, to preempt on-field ridicule during a state schoolboys' football carnival. Originally playing for Mount Hawthorn in the Metropolitan Junior Football Association, he soon progressed to a West Perth team playing in the Western Australian National Football Association (WANFA), which acted as a sort of reserves team for the senior club. In July 1935, he was selected in a WANFA representative side which toured the Goldfields. He made his senior debut for West Perth later that year. In 1941, Pola was named captain of West Perth, having served as vice-captain the previous year, and also played in West Perth's premiership side. He also shared the 1941 Breckler Medal, awarded to the club's best and fairest player, with Ted O'Keefe. Pola joined the Royal Australian Air Force (RAAF) in January 1943 as a leading aircraftman, and was discharged in February 1945. He returned to West Perth in 1945, and was again named captain, although only for one season, retiring two years later, after 152 games and kicked 203 goals for the club. Pola died in January 2012 at his home in Mount Lawley, and was buried at Karrakatta Cemetery. He was the last surviving member of the 1941 premiership team.
