= Aaron Black (footballer, born 1992) =

Australian rules footballer

Personal information
- Full name: Aaron Glenn Black
- Born: 25 December 1992 (age 33)
- Original team: Kingsley Junior Football Club
- Height: 181 cm (5 ft 11 in)
- Weight: 81 kg (179 lb)
- Position: Midfielder

Playing career^{1}
Years	Club	Games (Goals)
2022	West Coast	1 (1)
2010–	West Perth	280 (119)

Representative team honours
Years	Team	Games (Goals)
2013–2022	Western Australia	7 (5)
- ^{1} Playing statistics correct to the end of round 14, 2025.

Career highlights
- Sandover Medal (2014); 2x West Perth premiership player (2013, 2022); 2x West Perth Best & Fairest (2015, 2018); West Perth Captain (2018-present); (WAFL) Mark of the Year: 2019

Aaron Glenn Black (born 25 December 1992) is an Australian rules footballer currently playing for the West Perth Football Club in the West Australian Football League (WAFL).

== WAFL career ==
Black made his league debut for West Perth in round 16 of the 2010 season and was a member of the 2013 premiership team. He made his state debut for Western Australia in 2013.

In 2014, Black won the Sandover Medal for the best and fairest player in the WAFL with 47 votes.

== AFL career ==
In Round 2 of the 2022 AFL Season Aaron made his AFL debut for the West Coast Eagles against North Melbourne at Marvel Stadium. In his debut game, he collected 15 disposals and kicked a goal.

== Statistics ==
=== AFL statistics ===
Statistics are correct to the end of the 2022 season

Legend
G	Goals	K	Kicks	D	Disposals	T	Tackles
B	Behinds	H	Handballs	M	Marks

Season	Team	No.	Games	Totals							Averages (per game)						
Season	Team	No.	Games	G	B	K	H	D	M	T	G	B	K	H	D	M	T
2022	West Coast	47	1	1	0	11	4	15	2	4	1	0	11	4	15	4	2
Career			1	1	0	11	4	15	2	4	1	0	11	4	15	4	2
