= Barney Grecian =

Australian rules footballer (1871–1919)

Personal information
- Full name: Ernest Ferdinand Grecian
- Born: 18 November 1872; Geelong, Victoria
- Died: 2 June 1919 (aged 46); Perth, Western Australia

Playing career
Years	Club	Games (Goals)
1893–1895	Essendon	51 (1)
1896–1900	West Perth	65 (2)
Total		116 (3)

Career highlights
- VFA premiership player 1893-1894; WAFA premiership player 1897, 1899

Ernest Ferdinand Grecian, best known as Barney Grecian (18 November 1871 – 2 June 1919), was an Australian rules football player.

== Early life ==
Grecian was born in Geelong, Victoria in 1872.

== Playing career ==
Grecian joined Essendon in the Victorian Football Association (VFA) at the end of 1892, and made his debut in 1893. He played two VFA premierships with Essendon before moving to Western Australia in 1896, and joining West Perth in the West Australian Football Association (WAFA - now WAFL), where he captained premiership-winning teams in 1897 and 1899. Between 1896 and 1900, he played 65 matches for West Perth.

His state league career ended when he transferred in 1900 to Coolgardie to work in the post office.

== Death ==
In 1919 Grecian was hospitalised with athlete's heart. He died on 2 June 1919 and was buried at Karrakatta Cemetery.

== Honours ==
In 2004 Grecian was inducted in the West Australian Football Hall of Fame.
