= Brian Foley (footballer) =

Australian rules footballer

Personal information
- Full name: Timothy Brian Foley
- Born: 11 January 1933; East Perth, Western Australia
- Died: 18 August 1998 (aged 65); Leederville, Western Australia

Playing career^{1}
Years	Club	Games (Goals)
1954–1965	West Perth	202 (242)
- ^{1} Playing statistics correct to the end of 1965.

Timothy Brian Foley (11 January 1933 – 18 August 1998) is a former Australian rules footballer who played with West Perth in the West Australian National Football League (WANFL). He occupies a forward pocket in West Perth's official 'Team of the Century'.

Foley was a ruckman, nicknamed Big Blue due to his red hair, and when he retired after the 1965 season had played 202 games for West Perth. Career highlights include winning the 1959 Sandover Medal, two best and fairests and a Simpson Medal when he was best on ground in West Perth's 1960 premiership side. From 1960 to 1964 he was club captain and he represented the West Australian interstate team 21 times during his career.

In 1957 he signed a "Form Four" agreement that tied him to North Melbourne, but he was refused a clearance by West Perth, so he never played in the Victorian Football League.

His son Dan played in the Victorian Football League (VFL) with Richmond during the 1980s and his brother Des played for West Perth and East Perth.
