= Phil Smith (Australian footballer) =

Australian rules footballer (1946–2010)

Personal information
- Full name: Philip James Smith
- Born: 15 October 1946; Geelong Victoria
- Died: 31 January 2010 (aged 63)
- Original team: Newtown & Chilwell (GFL)
- Height: 188 cm (6 ft 2 in)
- Weight: 86 kg (190 lb)
- Position: Full-forward

Playing career^{1}
Years	Club	Games (Goals)
1968–1970	Geelong	12 (17)
1971–73, 1976	West Perth	71 (291)
1974	Woodville	17 (53)
Total		100 (361)
- ^{1} Playing statistics correct to the end of 1976.

Career highlights
- WANFL Premiership player: (1971); Bernie Naylor Medal: (1973)

Philip James Smith (15 October 1946 – 31 January 2010) was an Australian rules footballer who played for the Geelong Football Club in the Victorian Football League (VFL), the West Perth Football Club in the West Australian National Football League (WANFL) and the Woodville Football Club in the South Australian National Football League (SANFL).

Smith was recruited from Geelong Football League (GFL) club Newtown & Chilwell and, while making his senior VFL debut in 1968, he spent most of his time at Geelong in the reserves, making just four senior appearances in his first two seasons. Smith managed eight VFL games in the 1970 VFL season from which he kicked all of his 17 career goals.

West Perth recruited Smith in 1971 and, playing as a full-forward, he was their leading-goalkicker for three successive seasons. He kicked 84 goals in 1973 to win the Bernie Naylor Medal but missed that year's WANFL Grand Final, which West Perth lost to Subiaco. Smith was however a member of the 1971 West Perth premiership team. He played at Woodville in 1974 and was their best forward with 53 goals.

Smith died aged 63, on 31 January 2010, shortly after being diagnosed with cancer. He was the father of prolific Subiaco forward Brad Smith.

== Bibliography ==
- Holmesby, Russell and Main, Jim (2007). The Encyclopedia of AFL Footballers. 7th ed. Melbourne: Bas Publishing.ISBN 978-1-920910-78-5
