= Ray Lucev =

Australian rules footballer

Personal information
- Full name: Raymond Barry Lucev
- Born: 11 January 1942
- Died: 2 October 2025 (aged 83)
- Original team: West Perth
- Height: 188 cm (6 ft 2 in)
- Weight: 92 kg (203 lb)

Playing career^{1}
Years	Club	Games (Goals)
1961–64	West Perth (WAFL)	80 (45)
1965–66	South Melbourne	30 (14)
1967	West Perth (WAFL)	20 (17)
- ^{1} Playing statistics correct to the end of 1967.

Raymond Barry Lucev (11 January 1942 – 2 October 2025) was an Australian rules footballer who played with West Perth in the West Australian Football League (WAFL) and South Melbourne in the Victorian Football League (VFL).
