= West Perth Football Club =

Australian rules football club

West Perth

Names
- Full name: West Perth Football Club
- Nickname(s): Falcons, Cardinals, Garlic Munchers
- Motto: "Fear the Falcons"

2025 season
- After finals: WAFL: — WAFLW: 3rd
- Home-and-away season: WAFL: 7th WAFLW: 5th
- Leading goalkicker: WAFL: Tyler Keitel (52 Goals); WAFLW: Sara Riou (13 goals)
- Best and fairest: WAFL: Tyler Keitel; WAFLW: Taylor Ferguson

Club details
- Founded: 10 May 1891; 135 years ago
- Colours: Red Blue
- Competition: West Australian Football League (men); WAFL Women's (women)
- President: Jimmy Caffieri
- Coach: WAFL: Todd Curley; WAFLW: Clint Degebrodt
- Captain(s): WAFL: Luke Meadows; WAFLW: Emily Bennett & Gemma Bailey
- Premierships: List: 20 (1897, 1899, 1901, 1905, 1932, 1934, 1935, 1941, 1942, 1949, 1951, 1960, 1969, 1971, 1975, 1995, 1999, 2003, 2013, 2022)
- Ground: HIF Health Insurance Oval Kennedya Dr, Joondalup (capacity: 16,000)

Uniforms
Home

Other information
- Official website: westperthfc.com.au

The West Perth Football Club, nicknamed the Falcons, is an Australian rules football club located in Joondalup, Western Australia. West Perth competes in the West Australian Football League (WAFL) and WAFL Women's (WAFLW) and is the oldest existing Australian rules football club in Western Australia. Originally located at Leederville Oval, the team was relocated in 1994 to Arena Joondalup, a sports complex in the northern suburbs of Perth. The team's club song is "It's a Grand Old Flag" and its traditional rivals are East Perth.

== History ==
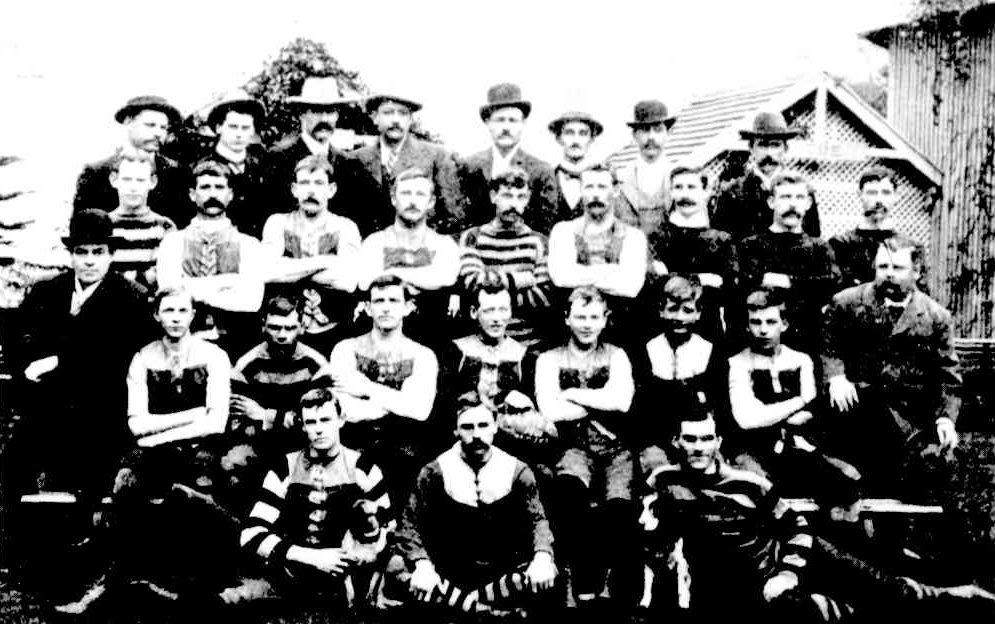
Senior Football team premiers 1901

West Perth were known as "the Cardinals" from the early 1900s till 1981. The name came from the team being referred to as the "blue and cardinals" in the early days.

The Victorian Football Club was established at a meeting on 2 May 1885. The new team was to play its games at the Recreation Ground (now Esplanade Reserve) and wear the colours cardinal and navy. Two weeks after the establishment of the new club it formed the WAFA together with Rovers and Fremantle. The three clubs, along with High School (now Hale School) were to play out the 1885 season, however High School dropped out after just two rounds.

The West Australian Football Club was established in 1886 and were admitted to the competition for the 1887 season. At a meeting of the two clubs on 16 April 1889, it was unanimously decided to amalgamate the two clubs – West Australian and Victorians – into a single club known as the Metropolitan Football Club for the 1889 season. The West Australian colours of black and red were to be maintained for the new club. In 1891, a meeting of footballers was held to form a new team, to be called West Perth, which embraced the members of the then-defunct Metropolitan Football Club. The new club was immediately granted entry into the WA Football Association (later called the WA Football League) and won its first premiership in 1897.

In 1915 the team became the original tenant of the newly built Leederville Oval where it would remain based until 1993, at which time the team moved to Joondalup to play games at Arena Joondalup from the 1994 season onwards. Since relocating, the Falcons have enjoyed relative success with five premierships from nine grand finals, the most recent flag coming in 2022.

In 2022 the club became the seventh active club to participate in the WAFL Women's (WAFLW), the premier state-based competition for female footballers.

In February 2024, the City of Joondalup asked the football club to consider changing their name to the 'Joondalup Football Club' or 'Northern Football Club,' considering they have resided in Joondalup for 30 years. The football club and the City of Joondalup are yet to agree on a naming deal.

Ever since it joined the WAFLW league, the club has been experiencing great success by getting to the preliminary final after only three seasons. This made the West Perth Football Club Women's WAFLW team the most successful expansion team in the history of the competition.

West Perth Football Clubs' Rogers Cup side (U19s competition) is amongst some of the most successful teams in Australian sporting history. Winning the flag in an undefeated season in 2021, this was backed up by 2-undefeated seasons in 2023 and 2024, culminating in a further 2 premierships for the club. As at August 2024, the Rogers Cup team sit at 34 wins in a row - An impressive undefeated streak.

== Club song ==
"It's a Grand Old Flag"
"(Sung to the tune of "You're a Grand Old Flag")"

It's a grand old flag it's a high flying flag,
It's the emblem for me and for you,
It's the emblem of the team we love,
The team of the red and the blue,
Every heart beats true for the red and the blue,
And we sing this song to you,
Should old acquaintance be forgot,
Keep your eye on the red and the blue!

== Honours ==
=== Club honours ===
Premierships
Competition	Level	Wins	Years won
West Australian Football League	Men's Seniors	20	1897, 1899, 1901, 1905, 1932, 1934, 1935, 1941, 1942, 1949, 1951, 1960, 1969, 1971, 1975, 1995, 1999, 2003, 2013, 2022
West Australian Football League	Men's Reserves	7	1927, 1930, 1947, 1956, 1960, 2014, 2019
West Australian Football League	Colts (Boys U19)	2	1968, 1990
West Australian Football League	Rogers Cup (Girls U19)	4	2021, 2023, 2024, 2025
Other titles and honours
Rodriguez Shield	Multiple	4	1960, 1999, 2002, 2022
State Premiership	Men's Seniors (1904–1924)	1	1905
Finishing positions
West Australian Football League	Minor premiership (men's seniors)	10	1897, 1899, 1901, 1905, 1942, 1948, 1960, 1975, 1993, 2022
West Australian Football League	Grand Finalists (men's seniors)	20	1891, 1892, 1893, 1894, 1898, 1903, 1906, 1911, 1922, 1946, 1947, 1948, 1952, 1953, 1973, 1993, 1998, 2002, 2015, 2018
West Australian Football League	Wooden spoons (men's seniors)	12	1895, 1918, 1919, 1930, 1938, 1939, 1964, 1974, 1990, 1991, 1992, 2026
West Australian Football League	Wooden spoons (women's seniors)	1	2022

=== Individual honours ===
Sandover Medallists: (12 total)

1922: Harold Boyd
1924: Jim Gosnell
1927: Jim Craig
1930: Ted Flemming
1940: Terence O'Keefe
1942: Laurie Bowen
1946: John Loughridge
1951: Fred Buttsworth
1959: Brian Foley
1992: Robert West
1993: Neil Mildenhall
2014: Aaron Black

Simpson Medallists: (11 total)

1946: John Loughridge
1949: Jack Larcombe
1951: Don Porter
1960: Brian Foley
1969: Bill Dempsey
1971: Shane Sheridan

1975: Mel Whinnen
1995: Darren Harris
1999: Christian Kelly
2003: Brent LeCras
2013: Mark Hutchings
2022: Luke Meadows

Bernie Naylor Medalists: (20 total)

1894: Bill Duffy (15)
1898: Herb Loel (N/A)
1899: Herb Loel (50)
1900: Albert Daly (30)
1901: Herb Loel (45)
1902: Herb Loel (35)
1903: Tom McNamara (32)
1911: William Bellion (30)
1925: Ted Flemming (50)
1930: Frank Hopkins (79)
1932: Ted Tyson (96)
1936: Ted Tyson (126)
1942: Ted Brunton (94)

1945: Bill Baker (91)
1951: Ray Scott (141)
1955: Ray Scott (83)
1963: Ron Evans (97)
1973: Phil Smith (84)
2018: Andrew Strijk (51)
2019: Tyler Keitel (50)
2021: Tyler Keitel (64)
2023: Tyler Keitel (57)
2024: Tyler Keitel (56)
2025: Tyler Keitel (52)

All-Australians:

1961: Ray Gabelich
1972: Alan Watling

300 games

Mel Whinnen (371)
Bill Dempsey (343)

200 games:

Aaron Black* (285)
Alan Watling (284)
Les Fong (284)
Paul Mifka (283)
Ray Scholfield (277)
Shane Nelson* (259)
Wally Price (256)
Peter Menaglio (236)
E J (Ted) Flemming (229)
Bill Rainoldi (228)
E A (Ted) Tyson (228)

Ken Ashdown (218)
Jason Salecic (212)
Norm McDiarmid (210)
Max Tetly (210)
Chris Keunen (209)
Jim Craig (203)
Brian Foley (202)
Len Harman (201)
Eddie Wylde (200)

(*) Indicates current listed players

== Club records ==
Highest score:

Round 10, 1981, 37–17 (239) vs. East Fremantle at Leederville Oval
Round 10, 1987, 37–17 (239) vs. South Fremantle at Leederville Oval

Lowest score:

Round 1, 1912, 0.3 (3) vs. Subiaco at WACA

Most games:

Mel Whinnen 367 (1960–1977)

Highest goal kicker (season):

E. Tyson 143 goals (1934)
R. Scott 143 goals (1953)

Highest goal kicker (game):

E. Tyson 17 goals v. Swan Districts (1934)

Highest goal kicker (career):

E. Tyson 1196 goals

Longest serving captain:

Les Fong, 7 Seasons (1980–1986)

Longest serving coach:

Bill Monaghan, 10 Seasons (2009 – 2018)

Most club champion awards won:

Mel Whinnen, 9

Record home attendance:

Round 21, 1978, 24,567 vs. East Perth at Leederville Oval

Record finals attendance:

1975 Grand Final, 52,322 vs. South Fremantle at Subiaco Oval

== WA Football Hall of Fame ==
West Perth players who have been inducted into the West Australian Football Hall of Fame:

Player	Year inducted
Fred Buttsworth	2004
Bill Dempsey	2004
Brian Foley	2004
Barney Grecian	2004
Stan Heal	2004
Fred McDiarmid	2004
Ray Schofield	2004
Ray Scott	2004
Max Tetley	2004
Ted Tyson	2004
Mel Whinnen	2004
Jim Craig	2005
Les Fong	2006
Brian France	2006
Jim Gosnell	2007
Alan Watling	2009
Wally Price	2010
Don Marinko, Sr.	2011
Frank Hopkins	2013
John Wynne	2015
Derek Kickett	2017
John Loughridge	2019

== Premierships ==
=== Grand finals ===
1897:

1899:

1901:

1905: West Perth 4–7 (31) def East Fremantle 3–9 (27)

1932: West Perth 18–9 (117) def East Perth 11–8 (74)

1934: West Perth 11–7 (73) def East Fremantle 5–9 (39)

1935: West Perth 11–8 (74) def Subiaco 7–9 (51)

1941: West Perth 14–14 (98) def East Fremantle 10–17 (77)

1942: West Perth 19–16 (130) def Claremont 11–13 (79)

1949: West Perth 16–13 (109) def Perth 12–7 (79)

1951: West Perth 13–10 (88) def South Fremantle 12–13 (85)

1960: West Perth 17–13 (115) def East Perth 12–11 (83)

1969: West Perth 21–21 (147) def East Perth 10–14 (74)

1971: West Perth 14–17 (101) def East Perth 9–15 (69)

1975: West Perth 23–17 (155) def South Fremantle 7–9 (51)

1995: West Perth 21–11 (137) def Subiaco 12–9 (81)

1999: West Perth 14–13 (97) def South Fremantle 11–6 (72)

2003: West Perth 13–9 (87) def Subiaco 9–10 (64)

2013: West Perth 20–11 (131) def East Perth 12–10 (81)
2022: West Perth 10-9 (69) def Claremont 8-9 (57)

=== Last premiership team ===
2022 premiership team
B:	Tyson Moulton (VC)	Sam Rotham	Zac Guadagnin
HB:	Dean Munns (C)	Noah Pegoraro	Ben Johnson
C:	Tristan Hobley	Luke Meadows	Aaron Black (C)
HF:	Sasha Kernutt	Anton Hamp	Conal Lynch
F:	Mitchell Dobson	Tyler Keitel	Keegan Knott
Foll:	Troy Yukich	Mitchell Peirce	Shane Nelson
Int:	Corey Rundle	Nathan Alexandre	Aidan Lynch
Int:	Joseph Hinder		
Coach:	Darren Harris		

== Club coaches ==
1919: Paddy Willoughby
1920–21: Tony Tyson
1921–22: Tom Soutar
1923: Archie Herd
1923–24: Jack Leckie
1925: Bert Taylor
1926–27: Tom Soutar
1928–30: Harold Boyd
1931: Sam Tyson
1932–33: Jack Cashman
1934–35: Johnny Leonard
1936: Jack Cashman
1937: Johnny Leonard
1938–39: Max Tetley
1940–41: Ross Hutchinson
1942–45: Joe Brooker
1946: Ross Hutchison
1947–52: Stan Heal
1953–54: Peter O'Donohue
1955: Don Scott
1956–57: Frank Sparrow

1958: Ray Schofield
1959: Don Marinko, Jr.
1960–63: Arthur Olliver
1964: Clive Lewington
1965–67: Bob Spargo
1968–71: Graham Farmer
1972: Peter Steward
1973–74: Dennis Jones
1975–77: Graham Campbell
1978–79: Percy Johnson
1979–81: Graham Campbell
1982–84: Dennis Cometti
1985–86: John Wynne
1987–88: Bruce Monteath
1989–91: George Michalczyk
1992–94: Jeff Gieschen
1995–99: John Dimmer
2000–01: Andrew Lockyer
2002–05: Darren Harris
2006–08: Todd Curley
2009–17: Bill Monaghan
2018–21: Geoff Valentine
2022-23 Darren Harris
2024-25 Jason Salecic
2025-26 Paul Sanzone

== Club captains ==
1885–86: Alexander Rankin
1887: Horace Wilson
1888: Harry Sadler
1889: Frederick McDonough
1890: Jack Kneale
1891: Ken McKenzie
1892: Alfred Newlands
1893–94: George Sykes
1895: James Morgan
1896: Jack Coward and David DeCoit
1897–1900: Barney Grecian
1901: Les Jones and Billy Plunkett (1)
1902: Herbert Loel (1)
1903: Herbert Loel (2) and Bundy McNamara
1904: Billy Plunkett (2)
1905: Billy Plunkett (3) and Shooter Ford (1)
1906: Shooter Ford (2)
1907: Gerald Balme (1)
1908: Frederick Strickland
1909: Jim Everett
1910–11: Gerald Balme (2)
1912: Gerald Balme (3) and Bill Mose
1913–14: Samuel Rowe
1915–16: Anthony Austin
1917: Samuel Jeffery
1918: Jack O'Dea
1919: Paddy Willoughby
1920: Tony Tyson
1921–22: Tom Soutar (1)
1923–24: Harold Boyd
1925: Bert Taylor
1926: Tom Soutar (2)
1927: Donald Sinclair
1928: Bill McRae, Jim Gosnell, Jim Craig (1), and Jack McDiarmid
1929: Ernest Moyle
1930: Jim Craig (2)
1931: Ted Flemming (1)
1932–33: Jack Cashman
1934–35: Don Marinko, Sr.

1936: Bill Benton
1937: Ted Flemming (2) and Wally Buttsworth
1938–39: Max Tetly
1940–41: Dick Hill
1941: Spike Pola (1)
1942–43: Len Harman
1944: Fred Buttsworth
1945: Spike Pola (2)
1946: Ross Hutchinson
1947–51: Stan Heal
1952: Ray Schofield (1)
1953–54: Peter O'Donohue
1955: Don Scott
1956: Frank Sparrow
1957–58: Ray Schofield (2)
1959–60: Don Marinko, Jr.
1961–64: Brian Foley
1965–67: Bob Spargo
1968–71: Graham Farmer
1972: Peter Steward
1973–76: Bill Dempsey
1977: Mel Whinnen
1978: Arthur Duckworth
1979: Geoff Taylor
1980–86: Les Fong
1987–89: Peter Menaglio
1990: Paul Hasler
1991: David Palm
1992–94: Craig Nelson
1995–96: Darren Harris
1997–98: Brendan Barrows
1999–2000: Kim Rigoll (1)
2001–03: Steve Trewhella
2004: Kim Rigoll (2)
2005: Todd Curley
2006–07: Clayton Lasscock
2008–13: Jason Salecic
2014–15: Jay van Berlo (1) and Luke Tedesco
2016–17: Jay van Berlo (2)
2018–21: Aaron Black
2022-23: Aaron Black and Dean Munns
2024: Dean Munns
2025-: Luke Meadows

== Current squad ==
As of February 2026:

1 Aaron Black
2 Luke Meadows
3 Ben Johnson
4 Tyson Moulton
5 Nathan Alexandre
6 Jack Demarte
7 Keegan Knott
8 Matt Shannon
9 Josh Rotham
10 Zac Guadagnin
11 Joesph Hinder
12 Jonah Brooks
13 Riley Sprigg
14 Shane Nelson
15 Kane Bevan
16 Matt McKenzie
17 Chad Mulvogue
18 Bailey Long
19 Sam Rotham
20 Bailey Thompson
21 Josh Bell
22 Darcy Dixon
23 Conal Lynch
24 Zac Sprigg

25 Jack Wooden
26 Ben Fairbank
27 Sandon Page
28 Noah Pegoraro
29 Nate Dimanlig
30 Lochlain Carpenter
31 Jason Gillbee
32 Byron Sherwood
33 Aiden Nelson
34 Odin Jones
35 Coen Livingstone
36 Darcy Hobbs
37 Tyler Keitel
38 Jayden Rigoll
39 Cooper Bewick
40 Luke Michael
41 John Coleman
42 Matt Galjaardt
43 Menno Inverarity
44 Connor West

45 Corey Rundle
46 Trent Hiscock
47 Kai Dehavilland
48 Connor Klemke
49 Aven Drewett
50 Zarne Robis
51 Cody Connell
52 Ryan Gallen
53 Max Connell
54 Mitch
55 Jared Cole

== Team of the Century ==
Team of the Century
B:	Wally Price	Ray Schofield	Bill Dempsey
HB:	Harold Boyd	Brian France	Ted Flemming
C:	Peter Menaglio	Mel Whinnen	Stan Heal
HF:	John Loughridge	Fred Buttsworth	Don Marinko, Sr.
F:	Bill Valli	Ted Tyson	Brian Foley
Foll:	Graham Farmer	Ed O'Keefe	Les Fong
Int:	Ken Ashdown	Jim Craig	Jim Gosnell
Int:	Jack McDiarmid	Ray Scott	Max Tetley; Alan Watling
Coach:	Stan Heal		

== AFL/VFL players (including rookies) ==
This is a list of West Perth players who have played at AFL/VFL level:

- Blake Acres (St Kilda, Fremantle and Carlton)
- Marcus Adams (Western Bulldogs and Brisbane Lions)
- Oscar Allen (West Coast)
- Ian Anderson (Essendon)
- Horrie Bant (1882–1957) (St Kilda and Essendon)
- Liam Baker (Richmond and West Coast)
- Laurie Bellotti (West Coast)
- Bill Benton (1906–1979) (Richmond)
- Jack Beveridge (1907–1986) (Collingwood)
- Darren Bewick (Essendon)
- Rohan Bewick (Brisbane Lions)
- Aaron Black (footballer, born 1992) (West Coast)
- Ashley Blurton (West Coast and Richmond)
- Kepler Bradley (Essendon and Fremantle)
- Phil Bradmore (Footscray)
- Bruce Bridges (1917–1999) (Fitzroy)
- Steven Browne (Carlton)
- Jeff Bruce (Fitzroy)
- Bill Burns (1884–1955) (Geelong and Richmond)
- Ronnie Burns (Geelong and Adelaide)
- Fred Buttsworth (Essendon)
- Wally Buttsworth (1917–2002) (Essendon)
- Adam Campbell (Fremantle)
- Jack Cashman (1906–1982) (Fitzroy and Carlton)
- Callum Chambers (West Coast and Carlton)
- Heath Chapman (Fremantle)
- Kevin Clarke (1931–2009) (Melbourne and Carlton)
- Ernie Coward (1916–1985) (Essendon)
- Phil Cronan (St Kilda and Footscray)
- Todd Curley (Collingwood and Footscray/Western Bulldogs)
- Jack Darling (West Coast)
- Bill Davern (1883–1952) (Geelong)
- Jim Davies (1926–2010) (Carlton)
- Barry Day (Essendon)
- Ian Downsborough (West Coast, Port Adelaide and Adelaide)
- Billy Duckworth (Essendon)
- John Duckworth (Fitzroy)
- Max Duffy (Fremantle)
- Russell Ellen (Essendon)
- Neil Evans (Essendon)
- Ron Evans (1939–2007) (Essendon)
- Brian Falconer (Hawthorn)
- Graham Farmer (Geelong)
- Brendon Fewster (West Coast and Fremantle)
- Vic Fisher (1924–1999) (Essendon)
- Shane Fitzsimmons (Melbourne)
- Dan Foley (Richmond)
- Arthur Ford (1881–1953) (Carlton)
- Peter Freeman (St Kilda)
- Ray Gabelich (1933–2000) (Collingwood)
- John Gastev (West Coast and Brisbane Bears)
- Barney Grecian (1872–1919) (Essendon)
- Ralph Green (1911–1991) (Carlton)
- Chris Groom (Adelaide, Fremantle and North Melbourne)
- Brad Gwilliam (West Coast and Richmond)
- Derek Hall (West Coast and Geelong)
- Len Halley (Essendon)
- Jack Heal (1919–1988) (Melbourne)
- Stan Heal (1920–2010) (Melbourne)
- Trevor Heath (Essendon)
- Col Hebbard (Essendon)
- Bradley Hill (Hawthorn, Fremantle and St Kilda)
- Stephen Hill (Fremantle)
- Ray Holden (Melbourne)
- Mark Hutchings (West Coast)
- Jordan Jones (West Coast)
- Derek Kickett (North Melbourne, Essendon and Sydney Swans)
- Sean King (West Coast)
- Steven Koops (Fremantle and Western Bulldogs)
- Dean Laidley (West Coast and North Melbourne)
- Ken Leahy (1906–1985) (Geelong)
- Brent LeCras (North Melbourne)
- Mark LeCras (West Coast)
- Teddy Lockwood (1872–1953) (Geelong and Collingwood)
- Justin Longmuir (Fremantle)
- Troy Longmuir (Melbourne, Fremantle and Carlton)
- Ray Lucev (South Melbourne)
- Quinten Lynch (West Coast and Collingwood)
- Tom Marinko (1941–1981) (St Kilda)
- Josh Mellington (Fremantle)
- Mark Merenda (Richmond and West Coast)
- Paul Mifka (West Coast)
- Neil Mildenhall (Fremantle)
- Digby Morrell (North Melbourne and Carlton)
- Ray Niven (1910–1992) (Fitzroy and Melbourne)
- Darren O'Brien (Melbourne)
- Peter O'Donohue (1923–2012) (Hawthorn)
- David Palm (Richmond)
- Michael Pettigrew (Port Adelaide)
- Len Phillips (1890–1968) (St Kilda and Essendon)
- Jaxon Prior (Brisbane Lions and Essendon)
- Andrew Purser (Footscray)
- Bert Renfrey (1879–1940) (St Kilda)
- George Renwick (1886–1945) (Carlton)
- Arthur Retell (1906–1978) (St Kilda)
- Laurie Richards (Fitzroy)
- Mike Richardson (Collingwood, Essendon and Brisbane Bears)
- Jon Riggs (St Kilda)
- Austin Robertson Sr. (1907–1988) (South Melbourne)
- Nick Robertson (Brisbane Lions)
- Bob Robinson (1914–2001) (Fitzroy)
- Warren Roper (Collingwood)
- Brian Sampson (1941–2012) (Essendon)
- Don Scott (South Melbourne)
- Paul Shanahan (1948–2011) (Fitzroy)
- Wayde Skipper (Western Bulldogs)
- Josh Smith (North Melbourne)
- Phil Smith (1946–2010) (Geelong)
- Craig Smoker (Melbourne)
- Bob Spargo (Footscray)
- Darren Stanley (Footscray)
- Roan Steele (Collingwood)
- Peter Steward (North Melbourne)
- Andrew Strijk (West Coast)
- Paul Symmons (West Coast)
- John Towner (Essendon)
- Craig Turley (West Coast and Melbourne)
- Bill Valli (Collingwood and Essendon)
- Jay van Berlo (Fremantle)
- Nathan van Berlo (Adelaide)
- Robert Warnock (Fremantle and Carlton)
- Connor West (West Coast)
- Robbie West (West Coast and Footscray)
- Martin Whitelaw (Fremantle)
- Ike Whittaker (Footscray)
- Andrew Williams (West Coast and Collingwood)
- Don Williams (1935–1995) (Melbourne)
- Frank Williams (1884–1939) (St Kilda)
- Tom Williams (1876–1938) (Essendon)
- Troy Wilson (West Coast)
- Fred Wimbridge (1893–1977) (South Melbourne)

== AFLW players (including rookies) ==
This is a list of West Perth players who have played at AFLW level:

- Mia Russo (West Coast)

== See also ==
- West Perth players
