= Laurie Richards =

Australian rules footballer (born 1947)

Personal information
- Full name: Lawrence James Richards
- Born: 14 January 1947 (age 79)
- Height: 183 cm (6 ft 0 in)
- Weight: 78 kg (172 lb)

Playing career^{1}
Years	Club	Games (Goals)
1966–1970, 1978–1979	West Perth	119 (242)
1971–1974	Fitzroy	79 (69)
1975–1977, 1981	Woodville	50 (64)
Total		248 (375)
- ^{1} Playing statistics correct to the end of 1981.

Lawrence James Richards (born 14 January 1947) is a former Australian rules footballer who played with West Perth in the Western Australian National Football League (WANFL), Fitzroy in the Victorian Football League (VFL) and Woodville in the South Australian National Football League (SANFL).

Richards, a forward known for his high flying marks, was West Perth's leading goal-kicker with 36 goals in 1966, his first league season. He contributed largely to their 1969 premiership, with seven goals in the grand final against East Perth and 72 for the season, topping the goal-kicking for a second occasion.

He was recruited to Fitzroy for the 1971 VFL season and would be used by the club both at centre half-forward and on the ball. After kicking three goals on debut, Richards went on to make a total of 14 appearances that year and over the next three seasons played 65 of a possible 66 games. Richards was runner-up in Fitzroy's 1972 "Best and Fairest" and represented the VFL at interstate football in 1973. A vice-captain, he took 125 marks for Fitzroy in 1974, with the next best player from his club managing just 76. He also kicked 24 goals for the season, averaged just under 17 disposals a game and was his club's second best performer at the Brownlow Medal count with eight votes.

In 1975 he was on the move again, joining Woodville, with whom he spent three seasons before returning to Western Australia and playing two further WANFL seasons for West Perth. He finished his career back at Woodville where, aged 34, he kicked 26 goals from 18 appearances in 1981.
