= David Palm =

Australian rules footballer

Personal information
- Full name: David James Palm
- Born: 7 July 1958 (age 68)
- Original team: West Perth (WAFL)
- Draft: No. 11, 1982 interstate draft
- Height: 179 cm (5 ft 10 in)
- Weight: 81 kg (179 lb)

Playing career^{1}
Years	Club	Games (Goals)
1976–79	Norwood (SANFL)	65 (79)
1980–82, 90–91	West Perth (WAFL)	91 (50)
1983–88	Richmond	104 (38)
1989	Springvale (VFA)	
- ^{1} Playing statistics correct to the end of 1988.

David James Palm (born 7 July 1958) is a former Australian rules footballer who played with Richmond in the Victorian Football League (VFL) during the 1980s.

Palm played at both Norwood and West Perth before joining Francis Bourke's Richmond in 1983. A tough and aggressive defender, he appeared in all possible 22 games in his debut season. Against Essendon at the MCG in 1985 he kicked five goals and in 1987 he had perhaps his best season, averaging 16 disposals a game.

In 1989, Palm left Richmond for Springvale and was selected to represent the VFA at interstate football that year. He also served as Springvale's assistant coach.
