= 1932 WANFL season =

Season of Australian rules football

- Teams: 7
- Premiers: West Perth; 5th premiership
- Minor premiers: East Fremantle; 19th minor premiership
- Sandover Medallist: Keith Hough (Claremont-Cottesloe)
- Leading goalkicker: Ted Tyson (West Perth)
- Matches played: 67

The 1932 WANFL season was the 48th season of the Western Australian National Football League. The premiership was won by West Perth for the first time since 1905. The Cardinals’ win ended both a run of four consecutive premierships by East Fremantle, which won its fifth of seven successive minor premierships but lost both finals it played to be eliminated in the preliminary final, and West Perth's longest premiership drought in its history. West Perth's win was highlighted by the success of champion full forward Ted Tyson, who headed the goalkicking with eighty-four goals including a record eight in the Grand Final. (Note: Tyson's feat was bettered by Eric Gorman in the 1963 Grand Final with nine goals.) Tyson went on to kick an unprecedented 1,203 goals during a twelve-season career with the Cardinals, but their rise from winning only six matches in 1931 was due to the development of second-year defender Max Tetley, the discovery of a third pre-war Cardinal stalwart in Norm McDiarmid, (Note: Along with W. Clelland between 1897 and 1905, and Mel Whinnen between 1960 and 1975, the trio hold the West Perth record for most premierships as a player, having played in 1932, 1934, 1935 and 1941.) brother of star ruckman Jack, plus further outstanding youngsters Jim Morgan and Bob Dalziell.

It also saw a continuation of the first player drain from the WANFL to the VFL with the loss of Subiaco's Brighton Diggins and Bill Faul resulting in the Lions missing the finals for the first time in nine seasons, a remarkable record for scoring accuracy by Old Easts in slippery conditions, and a longtime record total of suspensions – the last of which was for twelve weeks and ended his career – to "Nails" Western, who had been recruited by Claremont-Cottesloe from East Perth to add toughness and vigour but played little because of his reports. Despite the return of Keith Hough, who set a record for the Sandover Medal with 32 votes, Claremont-Cottesloe remained on the bottom with only one extra victory. Two tragic deaths occurred – Claremont's vice captain "Boy" Morris after collapsing in the street five weeks beforehand on the Saturday of Round 18, and more significantly South Fremantle's Ron Doig after the first semi-final.

== Home-and-away season ==
=== Round 1 ===
	Round 1
Saturday, 23 April (2:45 pm)	East Perth 11.14 (80)	def. by	West Perth 9.9 (63)	Perth Oval
Saturday, 23 April (2:45 pm)	Perth 9.12 (66)	def.	South Fremantle 8.12 (60)	WACA
Saturday, 23 April (2:45 pm)	East Fremantle 18.13 (121)	def.	Claremont-Cottesloe 5.8 (38)	Fremantle Oval
	Bye; Subiaco
Perth defeated South Fremantle by six points after Doug Oliphant kicked a goal after the final bell.

=== Round 2 (Labour Day) ===
	Round 2
Saturday, 30 April (2:45 pm)	Perth 15.13 (103)	def.	West Perth 13.13 (91)	WACA
Saturday, 30 April (2:45 pm)	Claremont-Cottesloe 11.15 (81)	def. by	East Perth 16.8 (104)	Claremont Oval
Monday, 2 May (2:45 pm)	Subiaco 8.3 (51)	def. by	East Fremantle 15.15 (105)	Subiaco Oval
	Bye; South Fremantle

=== Round 3 ===
	Round 3
Saturday, 7 May (2:45 pm)	East Fremantle 22.14 (146)	def.	Perth 11.14 (80)	Fremantle Oval
Saturday, 7 May (2:45 pm)	East Perth 18.12 (120)	def.	Subiaco 12.17 (89)	Perth Oval
Saturday, 7 May (2:45 pm)	Claremont-Cottesloe 10.14 (74)	def.	South Fremantle 10.9 (69)	Claremont Oval
	Bye; West Perth

=== Round 4 ===
	Round 4
Saturday, 14 May (2:45 pm)	South Fremantle 10.18 (78)	def.	East Perth 6.15 (51)	Fremantle Oval
Saturday, 14 May (2:45 pm)	West Perth 9.14 (68)	def.	East Fremantle 9.8 (62)	Leederville Oval
Saturday, 14 May (2:45 pm)	Subiaco 5.21 (51)	def. by	Claremont-Cottesloe 12.15 (87)	Subiaco Oval
	Bye; Perth
Subiaco's inaccuracy gives them no chance against the Tigers, against whom the Maroons’ score remains the third most inaccurate on record. At one point Subiaco kicked six behinds without a goal in fourteen minutes of continuous attack with the wind.

=== Round 5 ===
	Round 5
Saturday, 21 May (2:45 pm)	Perth 14.14 (98)	def. by	East Perth 16.10 (106)	WACA
Saturday, 21 May (2:45 pm)	South Fremantle 9.18 (72)	def. by	Subiaco 10.13 (73)	Fremantle Oval
Saturday, 21 May (2:45 pm)	West Perth 13.14 (92)	def.	Claremont-Cottesloe 7.6 (48)	Leederville Oval
	Bye; East Fremantle

=== Round 6 ===
	Round 6
Saturday, 28 May (2:45 pm)	Claremont-Cottesloe 10.10 (70)	def.	Perth 9.14 (68)	Claremont Oval
Saturday, 28 May (2:45 pm)	East Fremantle 10.18 (78)	def.	South Fremantle 9.6 (60)	Fremantle Oval
Saturday, 28 May (2:45 pm)	West Perth 10.15 (75)	def.	Subiaco 9.15 (69)	Leederville Oval
	Bye; East Perth
West Perth defeated Subiaco with a goal from Sweetapple as the final bell rang.

=== Round 7 (Foundation Day) ===
	Round 7
Saturday, 4 June (2:45 pm)	South Fremantle 8.13 (61)	def.	West Perth 8.11 (59)	Fremantle Oval
Saturday, 4 June (2:45 pm)	Subiaco 8.11 (59)	def. by	Perth 8.14 (62)	Subiaco Oval
Monday, 6 June (2:45 pm)	East Perth 13.8 (86)	def. by	East Fremantle 26.5 (161)	Perth Oval
	Bye; Claremont-Cottesloe
East Fremantle kicked its most accurate score until 1987, made the more remarkable by the slippery conditions from rain in late May.

=== Round 8 ===
	Round 8
Saturday, 11 June (2:45 pm)	South Fremantle 18.15 (123)	def.	Perth 9.14 (68)	Fremantle Oval
Saturday, 11 June (2:45 pm)	Claremont-Cottesloe 14.13 (97)	def. by	East Fremantle 17.14 (116)	Claremont Oval
Saturday, 11 June (2:45 pm)	West Perth 19.5 (119)	def.	East Perth 13.14 (92)	Leederville Oval
	Bye; Subiaco
With nine goals, Ted Tyson moves to the head of the goalkicking despite his name having been mistaken for another player during the previous week's match (so that he was credited with one fewer goal then he kicked).

=== Round 9 ===
	Round 9
Saturday, 18 June (2:45 pm)	East Fremantle 17.24 (126)	def.	Subiaco 11.13 (79)	Fremantle Oval
Saturday, 18 June (2:45 pm)	West Perth 13.12 (90)	def.	Perth 11.15 (81)	Leederville Oval
Saturday, 18 June (2:45 pm)	East Perth 15.12 (102)	def.	Claremont-Cottesloe 8.17 (65)	Perth Oval
	Bye; South Fremantle

=== Round 10 ===
	Round 10
Saturday, 25 June (2:45 pm)	South Fremantle 13.13 (91)	def.	Claremont-Cottesloe 10.9 (69)	Fremantle Oval
Saturday, 25 June (2:45 pm)	Subiaco 13.13 (91)	def.	East Perth 8.17 (65)	Subiaco Oval
Saturday, 25 June (2:45 pm)	Perth 6.14 (50)	def. by	East Fremantle 10.20 (80)	WACA
	Bye; West Perth

=== Round 11 ===
	Round 11
Saturday, 2 July (2:45 pm)	Claremont-Cottesloe 3.7 (25)	def. by	Subiaco 9.12 (66)	Claremont Oval
Saturday, 2 July (2:45 pm)	East Fremantle 11.11 (77)	def.	West Perth 10.10 (70)	Fremantle Oval
Saturday, 2 July (2:45 pm)	East Perth 12.13 (85)	def.	South Fremantle 9.10 (64)	Perth Oval
	Bye; Perth
Claremont-Cottesloe did not score its first goal against Subiaco until time-on in the third quarter. Their score was their lowest to that point in the WA(N)FL and remains their second-lowest against the Maroons, as well as the longest they have ever taken to score their first goal. (Note: Claremont have never been goalless at three-quarter time; against Swan Districts in June of 1975 they also kicked their first goal in time-on of the third quarter.); The result of that game moved Subiaco off the bottom and away from their first wooden spoon since 1916.; A brilliant effort by rover/forward B. Ryan on a waterlogged oval ensures a depleted East Perth team remain in second position. On a very heavy ground, he kicked three goals and was rarely beaten in general play.

=== Round 12 ===
	Round 12
Saturday, 9 July (2:45 pm)	Subiaco 13.16 (94)	def.	South Fremantle 12.11 (83)	Subiaco Oval
Saturday, 9 July (2:45 pm)	East Perth 13.9 (87)	def.	Perth 10.10 (70)	Perth Oval
Saturday, 9 July (2:45 pm)	Claremont-Cottesloe 5.12 (42)	def. by	West Perth 11.5 (71)	Claremont Oval
	Bye; East Fremantle

=== Round 13 ===
	Round 13
Saturday, 16 July (2:45 pm)	Perth 17.13 (115)	def.	Claremont-Cottesloe 7.9 (51)	WACA
Saturday, 16 July (2:45 pm)	Subiaco 12.20 (92)	def. by	West Perth 15.6 (96)	Subiaco Oval
Saturday, 16 July (2:45 pm)	South Fremantle 15.9 (99)	def. by	East Fremantle 15.11 (101)	Fremantle Oval
	Bye; East Perth
West Perth led all day by five goals before Subiaco came back but fell four points short of a win. West Perth's win, despite having eleven fewer scoring shots than Subiaco, remains a club record.; A last-quarter miss by Ron Doig from in front after a brilliant clearance denies South Fremantle reward for a fine effort against the leaders.

=== Round 14 ===
	Round 14
Saturday, 23 July (2:45 pm)	West Perth 5.11 (41)	def. by	South Fremantle 8.12 (60)	Leederville Oval
Saturday, 23 July (2:45 pm)	East Fremantle 13.13 (91)	def. by	East Perth 14.15 (99)	Fremantle Oval
Saturday, 23 July (2:45 pm)	Perth 7.14 (56)	def.	Subiaco 7.6 (48)	WACA
	Bye; Claremont-Cottesloe
East Perth ends East Fremantle's eight-match winning streak with a brilliant second half in which they overcome a 33-point deficit – the biggest such reversal against Old Easts until 1940.

=== Round 15 ===
	Round 15
Saturday, 30 July (2:45 pm)	Perth 18.15 (123)	def.	South Fremantle 15.21 (111)	WACA
Saturday, 30 July (2:45 pm)	West Perth 14.4 (88)	def.	East Perth 9.11 (65)	Leederville Oval
Saturday, 30 July (2:45 pm)	East Fremantle 13.15 (93)	def. by	Claremont-Cottesloe 16.14 (110)	Fremantle Oval
	Bye; Subiaco
Claremont recorded a huge upset over pacesetter East Fremantle, who kick 9.6 (60) in the second quarter but fade out badly.

=== Round 16 ===
	Round 16
Saturday, 6 August (2:45 pm)	Perth 6.14 (50)	def. by	West Perth 13.10 (88)	WACA
Saturday, 6 August (2:45 pm)	East Fremantle 12.12 (84)	def.	Subiaco 7.16 (58)	Fremantle Oval
Saturday, 6 August (2:45 pm)	East Perth 13.17 (95)	def.	Claremont-Cottesloe 9.8 (62)	Perth Oval
	Bye; South Fremantle

=== Round 17 ===
	Round 17
Saturday, 13 August (2:45 pm)	East Fremantle 15.17 (107)	def.	Perth 10.12 (72)	Fremantle Oval
Saturday, 13 August (2:45 pm)	Claremont-Cottesloe 8.10 (58)	def. by	South Fremantle 16.14 (110)	Claremont Oval
Saturday, 13 August (2:45 pm)	Subiaco 6.18 (54)	def. by	West Perth 15.16 (106)	Subiaco Oval
	Bye; East Perth

=== Round 18 ===
	Round 18
Saturday, 20 August (2:45 pm)	Claremont-Cottesloe 10.3 (63)	def. by	Subiaco 9.13 (67)	Claremont Oval
Saturday, 20 August (2:45 pm)	West Perth 10.11 (71)	drew with	East Fremantle 10.11 (71)	Leederville Oval
Saturday, 20 August (2:45 pm)	South Fremantle 15.24 (114)	def.	East Perth 5.13 (43)	Fremantle Oval
	Bye; Perth
An East Perth team depleted by the loss of its entire regular half-back line is crushed by South Fremantle, effectively sealing the four as Perth require two more wins than the red and whites to take fourth place.; A fiery match between the western neighbours sees former East Perth star and Tiger recruit "Nails" Western suspended for six and four matches on two striking charges, whilst Snashall of Subiaco receives two weeks for the same incident.

=== Round 19 ===
	Round 19
Saturday, 27 August (2:45 pm)	East Perth 10.11 (71)	def. by	Perth 10.14 (74)	Perth Oval
Saturday, 27 August (2:45 pm)	West Perth 18.13 (121)	def.	Claremont-Cottesloe 10.14 (74)	Leederville Oval
Saturday, 27 August (2:45 pm)	Subiaco 11.10 (76)	def.	South Fremantle 9.8 (62)	Subiaco Oval
	Bye; East Fremantle

=== Round 20 ===
	Round 20
Saturday, 3 September (2:45 pm)	Claremont-Cottesloe 7.12 (54)	def. by	Perth 9.9 (63)	Claremont Oval
Saturday, 3 September (2:45 pm)	Subiaco 14.15 (99)	def.	East Perth 11.15 (81)	Subiaco Oval
Saturday, 3 September (2:45 pm)	East Fremantle 12.9 (81)	def. by	South Fremantle 15.17 (107)	Fremantle Oval
	Bye; West Perth
Eight goals from Ashton allows South Fremantle to regains its place in the four against a weakened Old Easts team, leaving Perth needing to beat the fast-finishing Subiaco to meet East Perth in the first semi.

=== Round 21 ===
	Round 21
Saturday, 10 September (2:45 pm)	Perth 10.14 (74)	def. by	Subiaco 13.10 (88)	WACA
Saturday, 10 September (2:45 pm)	East Perth 11.14 (80)	def. by	East Fremantle 15.7 (97)	Perth Oval
Saturday, 10 September (2:45 pm)	South Fremantle 8.11 (59)	def. by	West Perth 13.10 (88)	Fremantle Oval
	Bye; Claremont-Cottesloe
A lapse into "listlessness" late in the second quarter – when Subiaco kick four crucial goals – ensures Perth fail to take South Fremantle's place in the four after the red and whites lost to West Perth.

== Ladder ==
1932 WANFL ladder
Pos	Team	Pld	W	L	D	PF	PA	PP	Pts
1	East Fremantle	18	13	4	1	1797	1375	130.7	54
2	West Perth (P)	18	12	5	1	1497	1240	120.7	50
3	East Perth	18	9	9	0	1512	1604	94.3	36
4	South Fremantle	18	8	10	0	1483	1328	111.7	32
5	Subiaco	18	8	10	0	1304	1442	90.4	32
6	Perth	18	8	10	0	1373	1530	89.7	32
7	Claremont-Cottesloe	18	4	14	0	1168	1615	72.3	16

Rules for classification: 1) points; 2) percentage; 3) number of points for.
(P) Premiers

== Finals ==
=== First semi-final ===
	First semi-final
Saturday, 17 September (2:45 pm)	East Perth 10.13 (73)	def.	South Fremantle 9.15 (69)	Leederville Oval (crowd: 9,257)
East Perth win a rough but close game to end a horror run of losses, but South Fremantle's captain-coach, Ron Doig died a few hours after the game from a cerebral contusion.

=== Second semi-final ===
	Second semi-final
Saturday, 24 September (2:45 pm)	East Fremantle 8.15 (63)	def. by	West Perth 12.9 (81)	Subiaco Oval (crowd: 17,432)
Cardinals won with a brilliant last quarter after being behind all day, to reach their first grand final since 1922.

=== Preliminary final ===
	Preliminary final
Saturday, 1 October (2:45 pm)	East Fremantle 11.9 (75)	def. by	East Perth 12.11 (83)	Subiaco Oval (crowd: 14,085)
East Perth ended East Fremantle's run of four premierships in a row with a hard-fought win in a game that was close all afternoon.

== Grand final ==
1932 WANFL Grand Final
Saturday, 8 October (2:45 pm)	West Perth	def.	East Perth	Subiaco Oval (crowd: 16,709)
2.2 (14); 10.6 (66); 12.7 (79); 18.9 (117)	Q1; Q2; Q3; Final	4.4 (28); 8.6 (54); 11.8 (74); 11.8 (74)	Umpires: T Campbell
Tyson 8, Sanderson 3, Rainoldi 3, Hopkins 2, Niven, Dalziell	Goals	Thomas 3, Screaigh 3, Cronin 2, Garnaut, Dempster, Booth
Niven, Tyson, Rainoldi, Cashman, Tetley, Dalziell, Morgan	Best	Thomas, Screaigh, Lalor, Booth, Dempster, Guhl
West Perth's effective use of the wind allows it to run away from a vigorous East Perth outfit to win its first premiership since 1905 under ex-Fitzroy captain-coach Jack Cashman. Tyson, with his eight goals, equals Sol Lawn‘s 1929 tally of 96.
