= Darren Harris (footballer, born 1968) =

Australian rules footballer and coach

Personal information
- Full name: Darren Harris
- Born: 18 July 1968 (age 58)
- Original team: Wodonga
- Position: Rover

Playing career^{1}
Years	Club	Games (Goals)
1985–1987, 1991	Wodonga	46
1988–1990	Golden Square	
1992–1996	West Perth	109
1997–1999	Wodonga Raiders	

Coaching career^{3}
Years	Club	Games (W–L–D)
1997-1999	Wodonga Raiders	
2002–2005	West Perth	
2011-2012	Northern Bullants/Blues	
2017-2020	Claremont	
2022-2025	West Perth	
- ^{1} Playing statistics correct to the end of 2010.^{3} Coaching statistics correct as of 2025.

Career highlights
- Wodonga best & fairest, 1991; West Perth premiership captain, 1995; WA - Simpson Medal, 1995; West Perth best & fairest - Breckler Medal, 1995; WAFL Representative captain, 1996; Wodonga Raiders premiership coach, 1998; West Perth premiership coach, 2003, 2022

Darren Harris (born 18 July 1968) is a former Australian rules football coach and player, who spent significant parts of his career in the Australian Football League, West Australian Football League, and Ovens & Murray Football League.

== Playing career ==
Harris never played football at a national level, and his career at the state level was short but memorable. He played primarily as a rover/midfielder. From country Victoria, he played his early senior football for the Wodonga Bulldogs in the Ovens & Murray Football League, winning a premiership there in 1987.

Harris moved to Bendigo in 1988 to complete a degree in primary school teaching. During his three years in Bendigo, Harris played for Golden Square in the Bendigo Football League, winning premierships there in 1988 and 1989 including the clubs Best and Fairest in 89. He was also part of the Bendigo Inter league team that won the Victorian Country Championships in 1989. He returned to Wodonga in 1991 and played one more season with the Bulldogs winning their Senior Best and Fairest.

In 1992, Harris moved to Western Australia, and secured a contract to play with West Perth in the WAFL. Harris quickly became a star player at West Perth. In 1995, his best season for West Perth, Harris was club captain, won the Breckler Medal as best and fairest, captained the team to its first premiership since 1975, and won the Simpson Medal as best on the ground in the team's 56-point Grand Final win over Subiaco. He captained the WAFL representative team in 1996 and was ultimately named in the West Perth Team of the Decade for 1994-2003. Harris played five seasons for West Perth before leaving at the end of 1996.

== Coaching career ==
Following his departure from West Perth, Harris returned to Wodonga, where he signed up as playing coach for the Wodonga Raiders in the Ovens & Murray Football League, the cross-town rivals to his former team. He coached at the Raiders for three seasons, winning the club's first and (as of 2022) only Ovens & Murray Football League premiership in 1998. In 2000, Harris left the Raiders and took an assistant and development coaching role with the NSW/ACT Rams in the TAC Cup.

After the Rams left the TAC Cup at the end of 2001, Harris returned to West Perth and took on the senior coaching role. As coach, he took the Falcons to back-to-back Grand Finals in 2002 and 2003, winning the premiership in 2003 with a 23-point win against Subiaco. Harris coached four seasons at West Perth in this stint.

In 2006, Harris was recruited for the first time to the Australian Football League, taking an assistant coaching role at the West Coast Eagles. He held this role from 2006 until 2008, and was at the club for its 2006 premiership. Harris and the Eagles parted company mutually at the end of 2008 as Harris sought to return to Victoria.

In 2009, Harris became development manager at the Carlton Football Club, spending two years in this role, before becoming development coach and the senior coach of Carlton's VFL-affiliate club, the Northern Bullants, in 2011. He gave up the VFL coaching role at the end of the season in 2011 to focus on the development role, but returned to the senior coaching role for the newly renamed Northern Blues after Robert Hyde stepped down from the role at midseason in 2012.

Harris left Carlton at the end of 2012 and returned to Western Australia to take up a position at leadership consulting firm Leading Teams. He coached the WAFL representative team in 2015 and 2016, despite not serving in a league coaching role at the time; Then, in 2017 left Leading Teams to take the senior coaching role at Claremont. He coached there for four seasons, leading Claremont to the 2020 Grand Final, before being sacked ten days later. He returned to West Perth for a second stint as senior coach starting in 2022 and led the club to the premiership the same season – beating Claremont in the Grand Final.
