= Bill Valli =

Australian rules footballer

Personal information
- Full name: William Thomas John Valli
- Born: 16 April 1950 (age 76)
- Original team: Hale School
- Height: 171 cm (5 ft 7 in)
- Weight: 71 kg (157 lb)

Playing career^{1}
Years	Club	Games (Goals)
1969–1978	West Perth	147 (207)
1979	Collingwood	17 (17)
1980	Essendon	1 (0)
1981–1982	Subiaco	37 (?)
- ^{1} Playing statistics correct to the end of 1982.

William Thomas John Valli (born 16 April 1950) is a former Australian rules footballer who played for Collingwood and Essendon in the Victorian Football League (VFL).

Valli had a noted career with WANFL club West Perth prior to arriving in the VFL. He played 147 senior games for West Perth between 1969 and 1978, winning their 'Fairest and best' award on three occasions, 1974, 1977 and 1978. Although in 2000 he was named in West Perth's official 'Team of the Century' as a forward pocket, he spent most of his time as a rover. He also represented Western Australia in six interstate matches during his career.

His VFL stint began in 1979 with Collingwood and despite playing the majority of their games that season missed out on selection in the 1979 Grand Final. The following season he crossed to Essendon but could only manage the solitary game.

In 1981, Valli returned to Western Australia and spent the next two years at Subiaco to bring his final WANFL/WAFL tally to 184 games.

A real estate agent and auctioneer, Bill Valli currently works as a sales representative for Holdsworth Real Estate in Yokine, Western Australia.
