= Arthur Retell =

Australian rules footballer (1906–1978)

Personal information
- Full name: Arthur Retell
- Born: 22 January 1906; Albany, Western Australia
- Died: 13 June 1978 (aged 72); Myaree, Western Australia
- Original team: South Fremantle
- Height: 183 cm (6 ft 0 in)
- Weight: 88 kg (194 lb)

Playing career^{1}
Years	Club	Games (Goals)
1929–1933	South Fremantle	44 (28)
1935	St Kilda	8 (8)
- ^{1} Playing statistics correct to the end of 1935.

Arthur "Snowy" Retell (22 January 1906 – 13 June 1978) was an Australian rules footballer who played for South Fremantle in the West Australian Football League (WAFL) and St Kilda in the Victorian Football League (VFL).

== Family ==
The son of Paulus Retel (1873-1918), and Susan Ellen Retell (1866-1940), née Rickard, Arthur Retell was born at Albany, Western Australia on 22 January 1906. His father served as a private in the First AIF during World War I and died aboard the HMAT Warilda on 3 August 1918.

He married Murielle Louisa Webb (1908-) on 11 June 1927. He married for a second time in 1942 to Millicent Jessie Andrew (1910-1993).

== Football ==
=== South Fremantle (WAFL) ===
He played for the South Fremantle Football Club in the West Australian Football League. from 1929 to 1933. He represented Western Australia at the 1933 ANFC Carnival in Sydney.

=== St Kilda (VFL) ===
In 1934, Retell moved to St Kilda where he was given employment. He was refused a transfer, and stood out of football for a year.

In 1935 he was granted a clearance, and played 8 games with the St Kilda First XVIII, scoring 8 goals, and the rest of the season with the Second XVIII. In 1936 he was taken off the senior list, and was appointed coach of the St Kilda Second XVIII.

== Military service ==
Retell later served in the Australian Army during World War II.

== Death ==
He died at Myaree, Western Australia on 13 June 1978.
