= Bill Benton (footballer) =

Australian rules footballer

Personal information
- Full name: Bill Benton
- Born: 11 March 1906; Maldon, Victoria
- Died: 31 August 1979 (aged 73); Scarborough, Western Australia
- Original team: Birchip
- Height: 183 cm (6 ft 0 in)
- Weight: 87 kg (192 lb)

Playing career^{1}
Years	Club	Games (Goals)
1928–1932	Richmond	56 (41)
1933–1937	West Perth	66 (2)
- ^{1} Playing statistics correct to the end of 1937.

William Joseph Benton (11 March 1906 – 31 August 1979) was an Australian rules footballer who played with Richmond in the Victorian Football League (VFL) and for West Perth in the Western Australian National Football League (WANFL).

Benton, who came from Birchip, was Richmond's full-back in the 1929 VFL Grand Final against Collingwood. Although he kept Gordon Coventry to two goals, Benton would finish on the losing side. In the 1930 VFL season he played as a forward and kicked 35 goals, seven on them in a win over North Melbourne at Punt Road Oval.

Benton went to West Perth after leaving Richmond and was a member of WANFL premiership teams in 1934 and 1935.
