= Alan Watling =

Australian rules footballer

Personal information
- Full name: Alan John Watling
- Born: 23 July 1948 (age 78)

Playing career^{1}
Years	Club	Games (Goals)
1969–1983	West Perth	284 (323)
- ^{1} Playing statistics correct to the end of 1983.

Alan John Watling (born 23 July 1948) is a former Australian rules footballer who played 284 games for West Perth in the WANFL

Watling was mainly a ruck-rover but started his career on the wing from his debut in 1969. Strong overhead and possessing plenty of pace, he played in West Perth's 1969, 1971 and 1975 premiership teams.

A five time Western Australian interstate representative, Watling was an All-Australian at the 1972 Perth Carnival, and was selected in an All-star team to tour Europe for exhibition games at the end of the season.

In 2000 he was named on the interchange bench in West Perth's official 'Team of the Century' and was inducted into both the WA Football and West Perth's Hall of Fame.
