= Jim Craig (Australian footballer) =

Australian rules footballer

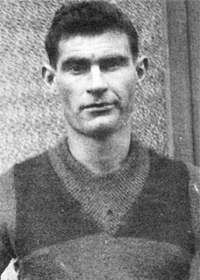

Personal information
- Full name: James Craig
- Nickname: Gibraltar
- Born: 15 October 1900; Kalgoorlie, Western Australia
- Died: 23 November 1978 (aged 68); Embleton, Western Australia
- Position: Centre half-back

Playing career
Years	Club	Games (Goals)
1918–31	West Perth	203 (57)

Representative team honours
Years	Team	Games (Goals)
1924–29	Western Australia	18 (2)

Career highlights
- Sandover Medal 1927; West Perth captain 1928, 1930; West Perth Team of the Century (2000)

James Craig (15 October 1900 – 23 November 1978) was an Australian rules footballer who played for the West Perth Football Club in the West Australian Football League (WAFL). He was the winner of the 1927 Sandover Medal as the "fairest and best" player in the league.

== Family ==
James Craig was born in Kalgoorlie, Western Australia on 15 October 1900. 2 Children Jim Craig and Maureen Craig (20.08.1930)

== Football ==
=== West Perth ===
He began playing with West Perth in 1918.

Craig captained West Perth during part of the 1928 season and for the entire 1930 season.

Having announced his retirement prior to the 1931 season, he resumed training in late June, and played several matches in the latter half of the 1931 season. He retired at the end of 1931, having played 203 games for West Perth.

=== Western Australia ===
He made his debut for Western Australia at the 1924 Australasian Football Carnival, held in Hobart. Craig also played in the 1927 carnival held in Melbourne, in total playing in 18 interstate and carnival matches for the state.

=== Sandover Medal ===
With seven votes, Craig was the winner of the 1927 Sandover Medal.

== West Perth's "Team of the Century" ==
In 2000, he was included as an interchange player in West Perth's "Team of the Century".

== West Australian Football Hall of Fame ==
In 2005 he was inducted into the West Australian Football Hall of Fame.

== Death ==
He died in Embleton in 1978.

== See also ==
- 1927 Melbourne Carnival
