= 1941 WANFL season =

Australian rules football season

- Teams: 8
- Premiers: West Perth; 8th premiership
- Minor premiers: East Fremantle; 24th minor premiership
- Sandover Medallist: Haydn Bunton, Sr. (Subiaco)
- Leading goalkicker: George Doig (East Fremantle)
- Matches played: 84

The 1941 WANFL season was the 57th season of the various incarnations of the Western Australian National Football League. Owing to the drain of players to military service in World War II, the league was forced to suspend the reserves competition until 1946, and ultimately this was to be the last season of senior football in Perth until 1945 as the supply of available players became smaller and smaller and the Japanese military threatened northern Western Australia.

On the field, 1941 saw West Perth, boosted by veteran goal machine Ted Tyson's comeback from appendicitis and planned retirement, achieve a premiership barely two years after having lost 27 consecutive matches as a young nucleus that would make them a power after the war, including such players as Stan Heal and Bill Baker, defeated perennial powerhouse East Fremantle twice during the finals. In a thrilling struggle for the fourth position, East Perth lost out despite an impressive final-round win over the eventual premiers and missed the finals for the first time since 1930; they were despite a perfect season in the 1944 under-age competition not to return to open-age finals until 1952.

== Home-and-away season ==
=== Round 1 ===
	Round 1
Saturday, 26 April (2:45 pm)	Subiaco 13.9 (87)	def. by	Claremont 20.23 (143)	Subiaco Oval
Saturday, 26 April (2:45 pm)	West Perth 22.12 (144)	def.	East Fremantle 14.11 (95)	Leederville Oval
Saturday, 26 April (2:45 pm)	Swan Districts 12.7 (79)	def. by	East Perth 14.14 (98)	Bassendean Oval
Saturday, 26 April (2:45 pm)	South Fremantle 16.23 (119)	def.	Perth 13.13 (91)	Fremantle Oval
Subiaco kick ten consecutive goals in the first half before fading out against the three-time premiers.; Ted Tyson, who had to be coaxed from retirement, kicked 8.5 (53) as West Perth produce two brilliant quarters against Old Easts.

=== Round 2 ===
	Round 2
Saturday, 3 May (2:45 pm)	Claremont 19.20 (134)	def.	Swan Districts 17.7 (109)	Claremont Oval
Saturday, 3 May (2:45 pm)	South Fremantle 10.9 (69)	def. by	East Fremantle 22.13 (145)	Fremantle Oval
Saturday, 3 May (2:45 pm)	East Perth 11.6 (72)	def.	Subiaco 8.4 (52)	Perth Oval
Saturday, 3 May (2:45 pm)	Perth 8.8 (56)	def. by	West Perth 14.11 (95)	WACA
East Fremantle gain revenge for three 1940 losses against their derby rivals, whilst despite having only seventeen men for most of the game West Perth move to top position.

=== Round 3 ===
	Round 3
Saturday, 10 May (2:45 pm)	East Perth 11.17 (83)	def.	Claremont 6.17 (53)	Perth Oval
Saturday, 10 May (2:45 pm)	Swan Districts 12.16 (88)	def. by	Subiaco 18.9 (117)	Bassendean Oval
Saturday, 10 May (2:45 pm)	West Perth 14.17 (101)	def.	South Fremantle 10.17 (77)	Leederville Oval
Saturday, 10 May (2:45 pm)	East Fremantle 20.30 (150)	def.	Perth 7.9 (51)	Fremantle Oval
East Fremantle score 30 behinds in a WANFL match for the first time since the record 41 behinds against Midland Junction from Round 8, 1917.

=== Round 4 ===
	Round 4
Saturday, 17 May (2:45 pm)	East Perth 16.16 (112)	def.	Perth 10.9 (69)	Perth Oval
Saturday, 17 May (2:45 pm)	South Fremantle 14.14 (98)	def. by	Swan Districts 18.8 (116)	Fremantle Oval
Saturday, 17 May (2:45 pm)	Subiaco 11.4 (70)	def.	West Perth 7.15 (57)	Subiaco Oval
Saturday, 17 May (2:45 pm)	Claremont 20.19 (139)	def.	East Fremantle 12.16 (88)	Claremont Oval
A wasteful 1.9 (15) in the second quarter with the wind ensues Subiaco inflict West Perth’s first defeat.; Clem Rosewarne kicks nine goals in his best performance for Swan Districts, who win their first match and leave Perth alone without a win.

=== Round 5 ===
	Round 5
Saturday, 24 May (2:45 pm)	West Perth 26.23 (179)	def.	Swan Districts 6.7 (43)	Leederville Oval
Saturday, 24 May (2:45 pm)	Subiaco 9.9 (63)	def. by	South Fremantle 12.8 (80)	Subiaco Oval
Saturday, 24 May (2:45 pm)	Perth 17.12 (114)	def.	Claremont 14.16 (100)	WACA
Saturday, 24 May (2:45 pm)	East Fremantle 12.13 (85)	def.	East Perth 8.6 (54)	Fremantle Oval
West Perth rebound from the Subiaco loss by kicking 17.14 (116) to 1.5 (11) after half-time for their biggest win in open-age WANFL football until 1952.; The game also begins the longest ground hoodoo in WA(N)FL history, with Swans not winning again at Leederville until 1956.

=== Round 6 (Foundation Day) ===
	Round 6
Saturday, 31 May (2:45 pm)	Swan Districts 19.11 (125)	def.	Perth 12.23 (95)	Bassendean Oval
Saturday, 31 May (2:45 pm)	Claremont 21.14 (140)	def.	West Perth 10.1 (61)	Claremont Oval
Saturday, 31 May (2:45 pm)	East Fremantle 18.14 (122)	def.	Subiaco 6.9 (45)	Fremantle Oval
Monday, 2 June (2:45 pm)	South Fremantle 9.18 (72)	def.	East Perth 3.6 (24)	Subiaco Oval
West Perth’s score is the most goals by a team kicking one behind in a major Australian Rules League until Norwood kicked 12.1 (73) against Port Adelaide in 1981.; East Perth become the first WA(N)FL team goalless at three-quarter time since South Fremantle in the 1929 Grand Final.; The Royals’ score was the lowest in the WANFL since 1935 when Claremont scored 2.10 (22) against West Perth, and their lowest for 21 years.

=== Round 7 ===
	Round 7
Saturday, 7 June (2:45 pm)	South Fremantle 16.15 (111)	def.	Claremont 11.6 (72)	Fremantle Oval
Saturday, 7 June (2:45 pm)	East Perth 10.10 (70)	def. by	West Perth 10.13 (73)	Perth Oval
Saturday, 7 June (2:45 pm)	Perth 10.9 (69)	def. by	Subiaco 16.10 (106)	WACA
Saturday, 7 June (2:45 pm)	East Fremantle 17.8 (110)	def.	Swan Districts 14.10 (94)	Subiaco Oval

=== Round 8 ===
	Round 8
Saturday, 14 June (2:45 pm)	East Fremantle 17.23 (125)	def.	West Perth 8.5 (53)	Fremantle Oval
Saturday, 14 June (2:45 pm)	Perth 7.12 (54)	def.	South Fremantle 5.18 (48)	WACA
Saturday, 14 June (2:45 pm)	East Perth 14.16 (100)	def.	Swan Districts 8.10 (58)	Perth Oval
Saturday, 14 June (2:45 pm)	Claremont 20.13 (133)	def.	Subiaco 8.10 (58)	Claremont Oval
With postwar Perth champions Ern Henfry and Merv McIntosh starring, South Fremantle lose their place in the four.

=== Round 9 ===
	Round 9
Saturday, 21 June (2:45 pm)	West Perth 14.12 (96)	def.	Perth 9.15 (69)	Leederville Oval
Saturday, 21 June (2:45 pm)	Swan Districts 15.20 (110)	def. by	Claremont 21.9 (135)	Bassendean Oval
Saturday, 21 June (2:45 pm)	Subiaco 14.18 (102)	def.	East Perth 15.6 (96)	Subiaco Oval
Saturday, 21 June (2:45 pm)	East Fremantle 16.12 (108)	def.	South Fremantle 13.19 (97)	Fremantle Oval
East Fremantle break Claremont’s record from the previous season by winning after being fifty points behind at quarter-time.

=== Round 10 ===
	Round 10
Saturday, 28 June (2:45 pm)	Perth 5.11 (41)	def. by	East Fremantle 15.13 (103)	WACA
Saturday, 28 June (2:45 pm)	Claremont 14.9 (93)	def.	East Perth 12.10 (82)	Claremont Oval
Saturday, 28 June (2:45 pm)	Subiaco 15.10 (100)	def.	Swan Districts 14.14 (98)	Subiaco Oval
Saturday, 28 June (2:45 pm)	South Fremantle 24.20 (164)	def.	West Perth 15.8 (98)	Fremantle Oval
South Fremantle rebound with a superb win over West Perth led by ruckman Highham and centreman Clive Lewington. It remained their highest score against the Cardinals until 1979.

=== Round 11 ===
	Round 11
Saturday, 5 July (2:45 pm)	East Fremantle 13.22 (100)	def.	Claremont 10.16 (76)	Fremantle Oval
Saturday, 5 July (2:45 pm)	Perth 8.11 (59)	def. by	East Perth 11.15 (81)	WACA
Saturday, 5 July (2:45 pm)	Swan Districts 10.14 (74)	def. by	South Fremantle 20.24 (144)	Bassendean Oval
Saturday, 5 July (2:45 pm)	West Perth 15.7 (97)	def.	Subiaco 10.7 (67)	Leederville Oval
George Doig kicks his 1,000th goal as Old Easts record a run of wins over all the other clubs.

=== Round 12 ===
	Round 12
Saturday, 12 July (2:45 pm)	South Fremantle 21.23 (149)	def.	Subiaco 4.5 (29)	Fremantle Oval
Saturday, 12 July (2:45 pm)	East Perth 13.14 (92)	def.	East Fremantle 11.15 (81)	Perth Oval
Saturday, 12 July (2:45 pm)	Swan Districts 14.8 (92)	def. by	West Perth 17.4 (106)	Bassendean Oval
Saturday, 12 July (2:45 pm)	Claremont 16.25 (121)	def.	Perth 13.3 (81)	Claremont Oval
Subiaco kick their lowest score since 1922 as South Fremantle completely overwhelm them for the second time in three meetings.

=== Round 13 ===
	Round 13
Saturday, 19 July (2:45 pm)	Subiaco 12.5 (77)	def. by	East Fremantle 18.12 (120)	Subiaco Oval
Saturday, 19 July (2:45 pm)	West Perth 14.17 (101)	def.	Claremont 10.8 (68)	Leederville Oval
Saturday, 19 July (2:45 pm)	Perth 15.12 (102)	def.	Swan Districts 10.16 (76)	WACA
Saturday, 19 July (2:45 pm)	South Fremantle 7.8 (50)	def. by	East Perth 7.9 (51)	Fremantle Oval
In a thrilling match in heavy and windy conditions, East Perth take fourth place from the Southerners.

=== Round 14 ===
	Round 14
Saturday, 26 July (2:45 pm)	Swan Districts 8.8 (56)	def. by	East Fremantle 14.7 (91)	Bassendean Oval
Saturday, 26 July (2:45 pm)	Claremont 13.7 (85)	def.	South Fremantle 8.9 (57)	Claremont Oval
Saturday, 26 July (2:45 pm)	West Perth 9.7 (61)	def. by	East Perth 10.6 (66)	Leederville Oval
Saturday, 26 July (2:45 pm)	Subiaco 11.18 (84)	def.	Perth 9.15 (69)	Subiaco Oval
In very wet conditions, East Perth gain a second thrilling victory to be two games clear inside the top four.

=== Round 15 ===
	Round 15
Saturday, 2 August (2:45 pm)	Perth 11.7 (73)	def. by	West Perth 16.16 (112)	WACA
Saturday, 2 August (2:45 pm)	South Fremantle 15.15 (105)	def.	East Fremantle 11.13 (79)	Fremantle Oval
Saturday, 2 August (2:45 pm)	Swan Districts 13.5 (83)	def. by	Claremont 17.16 (118)	Bassendean Oval
Saturday, 2 August (2:45 pm)	East Perth 13.13 (91)	def.	Subiaco 7.10 (52)	Perth Oval

=== Round 16 ===
	Round 16
Saturday, 9 August (2:45 pm)	Swan Districts 15.18 (108)	def.	Subiaco 11.4 (70)	Bassendean Oval
Saturday, 9 August (2:45 pm)	East Perth 9.14 (68)	def. by	Claremont 16.9 (105)	Perth Oval
Saturday, 9 August (2:45 pm)	East Fremantle 25.12 (162)	def.	Perth 13.7 (85)	Fremantle Oval
Saturday, 9 August (2:45 pm)	West Perth 19.8 (122)	def.	South Fremantle 9.14 (68)	Leederville Oval

=== Round 17 ===
	Round 17
Saturday, 16 August (2:45 pm)	West Perth 22.16 (148)	def.	Subiaco 7.4 (46)	Leederville Oval
Saturday, 16 August (2:45 pm)	Perth 9.10 (64)	def. by	East Perth 14.12 (96)	WACA
Saturday, 16 August (2:45 pm)	South Fremantle 19.19 (133)	def.	Swan Districts 12.5 (77)	Subiaco Oval
Saturday, 16 August (2:45 pm)	East Fremantle 18.17 (125)	def.	Claremont 11.9 (75)	Fremantle Oval
With Tyson kicking fourteen goals, West Perth crush Subiaco to take a clear grip on the double chance.

=== Round 18 ===
	Round 18
Saturday, 30 August (2:45 pm)	Subiaco 8.11 (59)	def. by	South Fremantle 14.10 (94)	Subiaco Oval
Saturday, 30 August (2:45 pm)	Claremont 20.30 (150)	def.	Perth 10.16 (76)	Claremont Oval
Saturday, 30 August (2:45 pm)	East Perth 16.10 (106)	def. by	East Fremantle 19.8 (122)	Perth Oval
Saturday, 30 August (2:45 pm)	Swan Districts 8.9 (57)	def. by	West Perth 25.9 (159)	Bassendean Oval
East Fremantle’s win leaves East Perth, with a poor percentage, needing to beat South Fremantle to reach its eleventh consecutive finals series.; Claremont become the third WA(N)FL team to score thirty behinds in a match, replicating Old Easts’ score against the Redlegs.; West Perth become the first team to win consecutive matches by over 100 points. The feat was not repeated until 1980 by Swan Districts.

=== Round 19 ===
	Round 19
Saturday, 6 September (2:45 pm)	Perth 14.14 (98)	def.	Swan Districts 7.18 (60)	WACA
Saturday, 6 September (2:45 pm)	East Perth 10.10 (70)	def. by	South Fremantle 12.11 (83)	Perth Oval
Saturday, 6 September (2:45 pm)	Claremont 7.8 (50)	def. by	West Perth 9.14 (68)	Subiaco Oval
Saturday, 6 September (2:45 pm)	East Fremantle 15.15 (105)	def.	Subiaco 6.7 (43)	Fremantle Oval
A convincing first half gives South Fremantle fourth position and leaves East Perth needing a win and a South loss to avoid missing the finals for the first time in eleven season.; Despite Tyson being goalless for only the third time in his career, the Cardinals wrap up the double chance with a convincing if dour victory over the Tigers.; A Swan Districts team with only fifteen men at the start and seventeen at the finish convincingly loses a match that directly determines the wooden spoon.

=== Round 20 ===
	Round 20
Saturday, 13 September (2:45 pm)	West Perth 8.12 (60)	def. by	East Perth 12.11 (83)	Leederville Oval
Saturday, 13 September (2:45 pm)	Subiaco 15.11 (101)	def.	Perth 7.8 (50)	Subiaco Oval
Saturday, 13 September (2:45 pm)	East Fremantle 23.13 (151)	def.	Swan Districts 5.14 (44)	Fremantle Oval
Saturday, 13 September (2:45 pm)	Claremont 9.13 (67)	def. by	South Fremantle 18.8 (116)	Claremont Oval
Despite ending West Perth’s unbeaten run at Leederville, South Fremantle’s easy win over an exceptionally disappointing full-strength Claremont team ensures the Royals miss the four.

== Ladder ==
1941 WANFL ladder
Pos	Team	Pld	W	L	D	PF	PA	PP	Pts
1	East Fremantle	20	16	4	0	2267	1546	146.6	64
2	West Perth (P)	20	14	6	0	1991	1579	126.1	56
3	South Fremantle	20	12	8	0	1934	1585	122.0	48
4	Claremont	20	12	8	0	2057	1778	115.7	48
5	East Perth	20	12	8	0	1595	1473	108.3	48
6	Subiaco	20	7	13	0	1428	1989	71.8	28
7	Perth	20	4	16	0	1466	2097	69.9	16
8	Swan Districts	20	3	17	0	1647	2338	70.4	12

Rules for classification: 1) points; 2) percentage; 3) number of points for.
(P) Premiers

== Finals ==
=== First semi-final ===
	First semi-final
Saturday, 20 September (2:45 pm)	South Fremantle 15.14 (104)	def.	Claremont 11.21 (87)	Subiaco Oval (crowd: 7,732)
Claremont’s inaccuracy in the third quarter (three goals and twelve behinds) together with nine goals from brilliant leading by teenage full-forward Naylor, ensures the end of the Tigers’ premiership sequence.

=== Second semi-final ===
	Second semi-final
Saturday, 27 September (2:45 pm)	East Fremantle 5.18 (48)	def. by	West Perth 11.7 (73)	Subiaco Oval (crowd: 8,533)
With O‘Keefe, Shuttleworth and Woodhouse beating East Fremantle’s ruck division, and their forward work so poor that they scored no goals in the second and third quarters, West Perth comfortably win their first final since the 1935 Grand Final.

=== Preliminary final ===
	Preliminary final
Saturday, 4 October (2:45 pm)	East Fremantle 21.13 (139)	def.	South Fremantle 15.10 (100)	Subiaco Oval (crowd: 10,581)
A devastating last quarter burst, kicking 9.5 (59) to one goal, overwhelms South Fremantle who has started with an eight-goal first quarter.

=== Grand Final ===
1941 WANFL Grand Final
Saturday, 11 October (2:45 pm)	West Perth	def.	East Fremantle	Subiaco Oval (crowd: 15,835)
4.6 (30); 6.8 (44); 10.10 (70); 14.14 (98)	Q1; Q2; Q3; Final	1.8 (14); 4.13 (37); 6.15 (51); 10.17 (77)	Umpires: George Owens
Tyson 6, Baker 6, Stan Heal, Caddy	Goals	Meiers 3, George Doig 2, Casserly, Daniell, Ebbs, McDonald, French
Clamp, Bridges, Pola, McDiarmid, O‘Keefe, Mill, Max Tetley, Tyson	Best	Casserly (best on ground), Ebbs, L. Tetley, Haddow, Wendt, Meiers
Pace and teamwork enables the Cardinals to repeat their second semi-final triumph to the satisfaction of coach Ross Hutchinson, who said he "derived a savage satisfaction from the victory."
