= Jim Gosnell =

Australian rules footballer

Personal information
- Full name: James Gosnell
- Born: 7 July 1899; North Fremantle, Western Australia
- Died: 7 July 1969 (aged 70); Perth, Western Australia
- Position: Half-back flank

Playing career^{1}
Years	Club	Games (Goals)
1918–29	West Perth	122 (39)

Representative team honours
Years	Team	Games (Goals)
1923–28	Western Australia	15 (1)
- ^{1} Playing statistics correct to the end of 1929.

Career highlights
- Sandover Medal 1924; Breckler Medal 1927; West Perth captain 1928; Dillon Medal 1932; West Perth Team of the Century; West Australian Football Hall of Fame 2007

James Gosnell (7 July 1899 – 7 July 1969) was an Australian rules footballer who played with West Perth in the West Australian Football League (WAFL) during the 1920s.

Gosnell was a defender and started his WAFL career in 1918. He then spent the next two years in the Goldfields Football League where he played at Kalgoorlie Railways.

In 1921 he returned to West Perth and featured regularly in their team for the rest of the decade. He won the Sandover Medal in 1924, was also runner-up a further two times and won a West Perth 'Fairest and Best' award in 1927. Gosnell captained his club in 1928 and represented Western Australia in 15 interstate matches.

The Sandover winner ended back at Kalgoorlie in 1930 was a Dillon Medalist before retiring. He was later named on the interchange bench West Perth's official 'Team of the Century' and in 2007 was inducted into the West Australian Football Hall of Fame.
