= Peter Menaglio =

Australian rules footballer

Personal information
- Full name: Peter Ross Menaglio
- Born: 4 September 1958 (age 68)
- Original team: Tuart Hill

Playing career^{1}
Years	Club	Games (Goals)
1977–1989	West Perth	236 (186)
- ^{1} Playing statistics correct to the end of 1989.

Peter Ross Menaglio (born 4 September 1958) is a former Australian rules football player who played for West Perth in the WAFL. He played 236 games for the club between 1977 and 1989, winning club fairest and best in 1981, 1984 and 1989. Menaglio played for his state against South Australia and Victoria in 1987 and 1988.

He received an offer to play at Fitzroy in 1981 but declined. He retired from playing at the end of the 1989 season after which he served as a club selector for several years. In 2000 Menaglio was selected in West Perth's Team of the Century.
