= 1940 WANFL season =

Australian rules football season

- Teams: 8
- Premiers: Claremont; 3rd premiership
- Minor premiers: Claremont; 3rd minor premiership
- Sandover Medallist: "Checker" O'Keefe (West Perth)
- Leading goalkicker: George Moloney (Claremont)
- Matches played: 84

The 1940 WANFL season was the 56th season of the various incarnations of the Western Australian National Football League. It saw Claremont win its third consecutive premiership, but its last before returning to the status of cellar-dweller it occupied during its first decade in the WA(N)FL – between 1943 and 1978 Claremont played finals only five times for one premiership. South Fremantle, after a lean period in the middle 1930s, displaced perennial power clubs East Fremantle and East Perth as the Tigers' Grand Final opponent, and established some of the basis, in spite of three disastrous wartime under-age seasons, for the club's fabled dynasty after the war.

The season was severely affected by World War II, which claimed numerous players from all clubs and limited the availability of others, and also a dispute with the Perth City Council over charges for the rental of Leederville and Perth Ovals, which were not resolved fully before the season. Consequently, East Perth and West Perth were forced to play home games at either the WACA or Subiaco Oval; however this did not affect their performance and the Cardinals, with young players like Bill Baker, "Spike" Pola and "Pops" Heal coming of age, improved from one win in 1939 to eleven this season – and would have done better but for appendicitis ending Ted Tyson’s football after June.

Swan Districts, affected by the retirement of early stalwarts Jim Ditchburn and George Krepp, the loss early in the season of Jack Murray, and the recruitment of numerous players to the services, suffered despite the return of champion spearhead Holdsworth who was third in the goalkicking with 73 its first wooden spoon with only two wins. More surprisingly Perth – who had looked the previous season to be emerging from twenty years in the doldrums – could not replace captain-coach Austin Robertson and lost all but one of its final thirteen games for its worst record since 1923.

Notable highlights included the first double-century score in Perth senior football and two record comebacks over the final three quarters.

== Home-and-away season ==
=== Round 1 ===
	Round 1
Saturday, 27 April (2:45 pm)	Perth 14.11 (95)	def. by	West Perth 15.10 (100)	WACA
Saturday, 27 April (2:45 pm)	Claremont 18.11 (119)	def.	Swan Districts 10.9 (69)	Claremont Oval
Saturday, 27 April (2:45 pm)	Subiaco 11.8 (74)	def. by	East Perth 15.17 (107)	Subiaco Oval
Saturday, 27 April (2:45 pm)	South Fremantle 20.9 (129)	def.	East Fremantle 18.11 (119)	Fremantle Oval
Aided by a late clearance for Keith Shea from Subiaco, South Fremantle win a thrilling high-scoring derby.

=== Round 2 (Labour Day) ===
	Round 2
Saturday, 4 May (2:45 pm)	Subiaco 11.9 (75)	def. by	West Perth 17.14 (116)	Subiaco Oval
Saturday, 4 May (2:45 pm)	East Fremantle 11.18 (84)	def. by	Claremont 17.15 (117)	Fremantle Oval
Saturday, 4 May (2:45 pm)	Swan Districts 8.8 (56)	def. by	South Fremantle 18.19 (127)	Bassendean Oval
Monday, 6 May (2:45 pm)	East Perth 15.10 (100)	def.	Perth 10.7 (67)	Subiaco Oval
With Bill Baker providing support for Tyson in attack and improvement by young on-ballers such as Kingsbury and Rainoldi, the Cardinals exceeded their 1939 win tally after only two games.; Perth lodged an unsuccessful protest over the eligibility of Alvan Whittle, who was ruled to have recently enough resided in East Perth's district the following Saturday.

=== Round 3 ===
	Round 3
Saturday, 11 May (2:45 pm)	Swan Districts 9.10 (64)	def. by	East Fremantle 20.13 (133)	Bassendean Oval
Saturday, 11 May (2:45 pm)	South Fremantle 9.24 (78)	def.	Claremont 9.16 (70)	Fremantle Oval
Saturday, 11 May (2:45 pm)	Subiaco 12.12 (84)	def. by	Perth 14.15 (99)	Subiaco Oval
Saturday, 11 May (2:45 pm)	West Perth 10.7 (67)	def. by	East Perth 13.14 (92)	WACA
After kicking an amazing 3.22 (40) to three-quarter time in favourable conditions, South Fremantle kick 6.2 (38) to overpower the dual-premiership Tigers.

=== Round 4 ===
	Round 4
Saturday, 18 May (2:45 pm)	East Fremantle 11.14 (80)	def. by	West Perth 12.11 (83)	Fremantle Oval
Saturday, 18 May (2:45 pm)	Claremont 19.20 (134)	def.	Subiaco 10.10 (70)	Claremont Oval
Saturday, 18 May (2:45 pm)	East Perth 20.14 (134)	def.	Swan Districts 8.11 (59)	Subiaco Oval
Saturday, 18 May (2:45 pm)	Perth 18.15 (123)	def.	South Fremantle 7.10 (52)	WACA
8.7 (55) from Doug Oliphant and brilliant high-marking from Gook and Henfry give Perth a crushing victory (111 marks to 54) that proved a false dawn for the season.; West Perth beat East Fremantle at Fremantle for the first time since 1929.

=== Round 5 ===
	Round 5
Saturday, 25 May (2:45 pm)	East Perth 14.14 (98)	def.	South Fremantle 10.16 (76)	Subiaco Oval
Saturday, 25 May (2:45 pm)	Claremont 11.15 (81)	def. by	West Perth 12.10 (82)	WACA
Saturday, 25 May (2:45 pm)	Swan Districts 7.13 (55)	def. by	Perth 11.12 (78)	Bassendean Oval
Saturday, 25 May (2:45 pm)	East Fremantle 23.20 (158)	def.	Subiaco 14.3 (87)	Fremantle Oval

=== Round 6 ===
	Round 6
Saturday, 1 June (2:45 pm)	Swan Districts 6.11 (47)	def. by	Subiaco 18.25 (133)	Bassendean Oval
Saturday, 1 June (2:45 pm)	West Perth 13.11 (89)	def. by	South Fremantle 18.19 (127)	WACA
Saturday, 1 June (2:45 pm)	East Perth 6.16 (52)	def. by	Claremont 13.18 (96)	Subiaco Oval
Saturday, 1 June (2:45 pm)	East Fremantle 18.12 (120)	def.	Perth 13.12 (90)	Fremantle Oval
With rover Truscott scoring ten goals, South Fremantle demoralise the improving Cardinals in the final quarter after being behind all afternoon, scoring 8.10 (58) to 1.0 (6).

=== Round 7 ===
	Round 7
Saturday, 8 June (2:45 pm)	South Fremantle 14.18 (102)	def.	Subiaco 13.9 (87)	Fremantle Oval
Saturday, 8 June (2:45 pm)	Swan Districts 9.10 (64)	def. by	West Perth 16.10 (106)	Bassendean Oval
Saturday, 8 June (2:45 pm)	Claremont 22.17 (149)	def.	Perth 12.17 (89)	Claremont Oval
Saturday, 8 June (2:45 pm)	East Perth 9.14 (68)	def. by	East Fremantle 15.9 (99)	Subiaco Oval
South Fremantle set a record by winning from a quarter-time deficit of 45 points, to be broken later in the season.

=== Round 8 ===
	Round 8
Saturday, 15 June (2:45 pm)	Perth 10.12 (72)	def. by	East Perth 12.17 (89)	WACA
Saturday, 15 June (2:45 pm)	Claremont 12.6 (78)	def. by	East Fremantle 12.11 (83)	Claremont Oval
Saturday, 15 June (2:45 pm)	Subiaco 5.7 (37)	def. by	West Perth 15.7 (97)	Subiaco Oval
Saturday, 15 June (2:45 pm)	South Fremantle 22.27 (159)	def.	Swan Districts 11.11 (77)	Fremantle Oval
A missed shot on the siren from an acute angle by Johnny Compton denies Claremont a draw after trailing all day.

=== Round 9 ===
	Round 9
Saturday, 22 June (2:45 pm)	Swan Districts 14.14 (98)	def. by	Claremont 16.20 (116)	Bassendean Oval
Saturday, 22 June (2:45 pm)	West Perth 20.17 (137)	def.	Perth 8.10 (58)	Subiaco Oval
Saturday, 22 June (2:45 pm)	South Fremantle 14.18 (102)	def.	East Fremantle 13.11 (89)	Fremantle Oval
Saturday, 22 June (2:45 pm)	East Perth 12.15 (87)	def.	Subiaco 6.15 (51)	WACA
Despite Holdsworth kicking seven behinds from ten shots, Swan Districts play their best match for 1940 and are within five points of Claremont late in the last quarter.; West Perth move to second with a crushing win over Perth, with Tyson kicking 9.5 in his last major performance before appendicitis ended his season.

=== Round 10 ===
	Round 10
Saturday, 29 June (2:45 pm)	East Fremantle 18.21 (129)	def.	Swan Districts 13.6 (84)	Fremantle Oval
Saturday, 29 June (2:45 pm)	West Perth 11.4 (70)	def. by	East Perth 11.19 (85)	Subiaco Oval
Saturday, 29 June (2:45 pm)	Perth 8.9 (57)	def. by	Subiaco 15.5 (95)	WACA
Saturday, 29 June (2:45 pm)	Claremont 24.13 (157)	def.	South Fremantle 10.16 (76)	Claremont Oval
Despite losing Reid and having key strongman Compton carrying an injury, Claremont produce a superlative display against South Fremantle, with Heusler and Sutherland detracting the play and O'Neill dominant at centre half-back.

=== Round 11 ===
	Round 11
Saturday, 6 July (2:45 pm)	Subiaco 11.23 (89)	def. by	Claremont 20.9 (129)	Subiaco Oval
Saturday, 6 July (2:45 pm)	West Perth 8.13 (61)	def. by	East Fremantle 20.11 (131)	WACA
Saturday, 6 July (2:45 pm)	Swan Districts 9.8 (62)	def. by	East Perth 18.20 (128)	Bassendean Oval
Saturday, 6 July (2:45 pm)	South Fremantle 12.17 (89)	def.	Perth 9.13 (67)	Fremantle Oval
With George Moloney kicking thirteen goals, Claremont record the biggest win with fewer scoring shots in the WANFL until 1969.

=== Round 12 ===
	Round 12
Saturday, 13 July (2:45 pm)	Perth 10.22 (82)	def. by	Swan Districts 13.9 (87)	WACA
Saturday, 13 July (2:45 pm)	South Fremantle 18.14 (122)	def.	East Perth 10.13 (73)	Fremantle Oval
Saturday, 13 July (2:45 pm)	Claremont 17.13 (115)	def.	West Perth 14.12 (96)	Claremont Oval
Saturday, 13 July (2:45 pm)	Subiaco 15.18 (108)	drew with	East Fremantle 16.12 (108)	Subiaco Oval
In finally winning their first game for the year, Swan Districts record their greatest deficit in scoring shots for a winning match until the 1963 Preliminary Final.; East Fremantle and Subiaco played the first draw since the 1938 Grand Final, and what proved the last-ever senior WA(N)FL home-and-away draw at Subiaco Oval. It is also the last time any pair of pre-1926 clubs have played a first drawn encounter. (Note: As of 2025, Perth have never drawn any senior WA(N)FL match with either Subiaco or South Fremantle.)

=== Round 13 ===
	Round 13
Saturday, 20 July (2:45 pm)	Perth 12.7 (79)	def. by	East Fremantle 14.13 (97)	WACA
Saturday, 20 July (2:45 pm)	Subiaco 11.13 (79)	def. by	Swan Districts 16.13 (109)	Subiaco Oval
Saturday, 20 July (2:45 pm)	South Fremantle 18.15 (123)	def.	West Perth 12.12 (84)	Fremantle Oval
Saturday, 20 July (2:45 pm)	Claremont 11.14 (80)	def.	East Perth 10.6 (66)	Claremont Oval
With Holdsworth and Clem Rosewarne reaching their best form for the first time and combining for fourteen goals, Swan Districts win their second and last match for 1940.

=== Round 14 ===
	Round 14
Saturday, 20 April (2:45 pm)	Perth 10.11 (71)	def. by	Claremont 11.15 (81)	Subiaco Oval
Saturday, 27 July (2:45 pm)	West Perth 7.22 (64)	def.	Swan Districts 7.12 (54)	WACA
Saturday, 27 July (2:45 pm)	Subiaco 13.11 (89)	def.	South Fremantle 6.26 (62)	Subiaco Oval
Saturday, 27 July (2:45 pm)	East Fremantle 11.18 (84)	def.	East Perth 10.11 (71)	Fremantle Oval
In slippery conditions despite the driest season on record in southwestern Australia before the influence of anthropogenic global warming, West Perth become the first team to win after being goalless at half-time since East Perth in 1920.; South Fremantle’s inaccuracy – still their greatest excess of behinds over goals – gives Subiaco a major upset and leaves Claremont a game clear on top.; During the East Fremantle versus East Perth match, in a gloomy last quarter the unusual step was taken of using training lights.

=== Round 15 (Foundation Day) ===
	Round 15
Monday, 3 June (2:45 pm)	East Perth 12.13 (85)	def.	Perth 10.6 (66)	Subiaco Oval
Saturday, 10 August (2:45 pm)	East Fremantle 18.11 (119)	def.	Claremont 9.8 (62)	Fremantle Oval
Saturday, 10 August (2:45 pm)	West Perth 16.19 (115)	def.	Subiaco 6.8 (44)	WACA
Saturday, 10 August (2:45 pm)	South Fremantle 24.10 (154)	def.	Swan Districts 13.10 (88)	Subiaco Oval
East Fremantle’s ability to keep the play crowded ensures Claremont cannot play its normal running game and results in an impressive win for Old Easts.

=== Round 16 ===
	Round 16
Saturday, 17 August (2:45 pm)	Perth 8.10 (58)	def.	West Perth 5.16 (46)	WACA
Saturday, 17 August (2:45 pm)	Claremont 33.22 (220)	def.	Swan Districts 7.15 (57)	Claremont Oval
Saturday, 17 August (2:45 pm)	East Fremantle 8.7 (55)	def. by	South Fremantle 10.14 (74)	Fremantle Oval
Saturday, 17 August (2:45 pm)	Subiaco 7.11 (53)	def. by	East Perth 8.9 (57)	Subiaco Oval
Claremont beat its record score of 29.19 (193) from the previous season, becoming the first WANFL team to pass the 200-point barrier. It is still the highest score kicked against Swan Districts and was the biggest win in the WAFA/WAFL/WANFL since 1902.; With 19.9 (123), George Moloney kicked the second-highest number of points by an individual in WA(N)FL history, behind Bernie Naylor's 23.6 (144) against Subiaco in 1953. It equalled George Doig's 1934 record for most goals in a match.; Despite the loss of Albert Gook, Perth end a run of nine consecutive defeats and deny West Perth a golden opportunity to move within half a win of the leading four.

=== Round 17 ===
	Round 17
Saturday, 24 August (2:45 pm)	West Perth 6.8 (44)	def. by	East Perth 10.11 (71)	Subiaco Oval
Saturday, 24 August (2:45 pm)	Perth 7.6 (48)	def. by	Subiaco 7.9 (51)	WACA
Saturday, 24 August (2:45 pm)	South Fremantle 9.13 (67)	def.	Claremont 8.14 (62)	Fremantle Oval
Saturday, 24 August (2:45 pm)	Swan Districts 9.16 (70)	def. by	East Fremantle 12.16 (88)	Bassendean Oval
On a boisterous day, South Fremantle, keeping Moloney goalless, take top place despite a strong second-half Tiger comeback.; East Perth practically ensure the four will be unchanged from 1939 with a comfortable win over their traditional rivals in a match where only 2.1 (13) was scored into the gale.

=== Round 18 ===
	Round 18
Saturday, 31 August (2:45 pm)	South Fremantle 13.15 (93)	def.	Perth 9.12 (66)	Fremantle Oval
Saturday, 31 August (2:45 pm)	Swan Districts 8.13 (61)	def. by	East Perth 9.14 (68)	Bassendean Oval
Saturday, 31 August (2:45 pm)	West Perth 12.14 (86)	def. by	East Fremantle 14.10 (94)	Subiaco Oval
Saturday, 31 August (2:45 pm)	Claremont 12.15 (87)	def.	Subiaco 10.7 (67)	Claremont Oval
East Fremantle's victory definitively settles who will play in the finals with two matches remaining as West Perth stand two and a half games behind.; Bottom club Swan Districts nearly cause a major upset but poor shooting for goal allows East Perth a win that keeps them in the running to have the double chance in the finals.

=== Round 19 ===
	Round 19
Saturday, 7 September (2:45 pm)	Subiaco 22.18 (150)	def.	Swan Districts 11.12 (78)	Subiaco Oval
Saturday, 7 September (2:45 pm)	West Perth 13.12 (90)	def.	South Fremantle 13.6 (84)	WACA
Saturday, 7 September (2:45 pm)	Claremont 17.17 (119)	def.	East Perth 14.12 (96)	Claremont Oval
Saturday, 7 September (2:45 pm)	East Fremantle 14.15 (99)	def.	Perth 14.9 (93)	Fremantle Oval
Moloney kicks his hundredth goal (having already done so for Geelong in 1932) as Claremont all but wrap up the double chance with a certain win against Perth in the last round.

=== Round 20 ===
	Round 20
Saturday, 14 September (2:45 pm)	Perth 14.10 (94)	def. by	Claremont 20.16 (136)	WACA
Saturday, 14 September (2:45 pm)	East Perth 8.7 (55)	def. by	East Fremantle 9.12 (66)	Subiaco Oval
Saturday, 14 September (2:45 pm)	South Fremantle 28.15 (183)	def.	Subiaco 7.6 (48)	Fremantle Oval
Saturday, 14 September (2:45 pm)	Swan Districts 7.6 (48)	def. by	West Perth 20.16 (136)	Bassendean Oval
In winning after Perth led by 47 points at quarter-time, Claremont surpass South Fremantle’s record from earlier in the season to hold the double chance in the wake of East Fremantle's win over East Perth.

== Ladder ==
1940 WANFL ladder
Pos	Team	Pld	W	L	D	PF	PA	PP	Pts
1	Claremont (P)	20	15	5	0	2208	1603	137.7	60
2	South Fremantle	20	15	5	0	2079	1687	123.2	60
3	East Fremantle	20	14	5	1	2035	1661	122.5	58
4	East Perth	20	13	7	0	1688	1488	113.4	52
5	West Perth	20	11	9	0	1769	1622	109.1	44
6	Subiaco	20	5	14	1	1571	1980	79.3	22
7	Perth	20	4	16	0	1552	1845	84.1	16
8	Swan Districts	20	2	18	0	1387	2403	57.7	8

Rules for classification: 1) points; 2) percentage; 3) number of points for.
(P) Premiers

== Finals ==
=== First semi-final ===
	First semi-final
Saturday, 21 September (2:45 pm)	East Fremantle 9.11 (65)	def.	East Perth 8.12 (60)	Subiaco Oval (crowd: 6,200)
In a battle of defences affected by rain after quarter-time, East Perth spend the last three minutes deep in attack but fail to kick the winning goal.

=== Second semi-final ===
	Second semi-final
Saturday, 28 September (2:45 pm)	Claremont 17.13 (115)	def. by	South Fremantle 19.16 (130)	Subiaco Oval (crowd: 9,166)
Remarkably pacy and precise play in the second quarter, scoring 9.7 (61) to 1.3 (9), puts South Fremantle into its first Grand Final since 1930 and makes it favourite for its first premiership in twenty-three seasons.

=== Preliminary final ===
	Preliminary final
Saturday, 5 October (2:45 pm)	Claremont 19.17 (131)	def.	East Fremantle 13.17 (95)	Subiaco Oval (crowd: 10,649)
Kicking 14.10 (94) to 2.8 (20), Claremont produce a remarkable second-half rally to enter their fifth consecutive Grand Final.

=== Grand Final ===
1940 WANFL Grand Final
Saturday, 12 October	South Fremantle	def. by	Claremont	Subiaco Oval (crowd: 19,511)
0.3 (3); 4.6 (30); 5.13 (43); 9.20 (74)	Q1; Q2; Q3; Final	4.7 (31); 5.10 (40); 9.12 (66); 13.13 (91)	Umpires: F Ryan
Don Smith 3, Matthews 2, Truscott, Richardson, Gorn, Riley	Goals	George Moloney 5, Serjeant 2, Byfield 2, Reid, Kemp, Gibson, Julian
Don Smith, Truscott (until injured), Shea, Reilly, Dearle, Richardson, Dave Doig	Best	Sutherland, Grieve, George Moloney, Hooper, O‘Neill, Guthrie, Hunt
Truscott (dislocated elbow)	Injuries
Superior forward play ensures Claremont wins its third consecutive premiership after a hard-fought struggle.
