= Harold Boyd (footballer, born 1913) =

Australian rules footballer, born 1913

Personal information
- Full name: Harold Boyd
- Born: 2 February 1913
- Died: 25 April 1971 (aged 58)
- Original team: Abbotsford

Playing career^{1}
Years	Club	Games (Goals)
1932	Fitzroy	11 (1)
- ^{1} Playing statistics correct to the end of 1932.

Harold Boyd (2 February 1913 – 25 April 1971) was an Australian rules footballer who played with Fitzroy in the Victorian Football League (VFL).
