= Harold Boyd (footballer, born 1900) =

Australian rules footballer

Personal information
- Born: 10 December 1900
- Died: 10 August 1990 (aged 89)

Playing career^{1}
Years	Club	Games (Goals)
1919–1925	West Perth	100
- ^{1} Playing statistics correct to the end of 1925.

Harold Boyd (10 December 1900 – 10 August 1990) was an Australian rules footballer who played for West Perth in the West Australian Football League (WAFL) during the 1920s.

A half back, Boyd started his career at West Perth when the WAFL resumed after the First World War. He won a Sandover Medal in 1922 and was appointed captain-coach the following season. In 1924 he lost his coaching duties but remained captain. He retired in 1925 after playing his 100th game, but returned to West Perth in 1928 as coach and remained with the club for three seasons.

Boyd occupies a half back flank in West Perth's official Team of the Century. He played seven interstate matches for Western Australia during his career.

== See also ==
- 1921 Perth Carnival
