= Albert Daly =

Australian rules footballer

Personal information
- Full name: Albert Andrew Daly
- Born: 29 January 1900; West Melbourne, Victoria
- Died: 11 April 1976 (aged 76); Parkville, Victoria
- Original team: South Melbourne Districts

Playing career^{1}
Years	Club	Games (Goals)
1925	South Melbourne	1 (0)
- ^{1} Playing statistics correct to the end of 1925.

Albert Andrew Daly (29 January 1900 – 11 April 1976) was an Australian rules footballer who played for the South Melbourne Football Club in the Victorian Football League (VFL).
