= Ed O'Keefe (footballer) =

Australian rules footballer, born 1913

Personal information
- Full name: Terence Bernard O'Keefe
- Born: 14 May 1913; Boulder, Western Australia
- Died: 24 December 1986 (aged 73); North Perth, Western Australia

Playing career^{1}
Years	Club	Games (Goals)
1933–1946	West Perth	194 (91)
- ^{1} Playing statistics correct to the end of 1946.

Terrence Bernard 'Ed' O'Keefe (14 May 1913 – 24 December 1986) was an Australian rules footballer who played with West Perth in the WANFL from 1933 to 1946. He was also known by his nickname Checker and in 2000 was named in the ruck for West Perth's official 'Team of the Century'.

O'Keefe was a member of West Perth's 1934, 1935 and 1941 premiership sides. A versatile footballer, he could play in both the ruck or across half back. He was a Sandover Medalist in 1940, to break Haydn Bunton, Sr's sequence of two wins in a row. O'Keefe also won four Fairest and best awards for West Perth, with them coming in consecutive seasons from 1938 to 1941. During his career he represented Western Australia in six interstate matches.
