= Ted Flemming (footballer) =

Australian rules footballer, born 1902

Personal information
- Full name: Edward Joseph Flemming
- Born: 30 October 1902
- Died: Unknown

Playing career^{1}
Years	Club	Games (Goals)
1922–1938	West Perth	229 (182)
- ^{1} Playing statistics correct to the end of 1938.

Edward Joseph Flemming (30 October 1902, date of death unknown) was an Australian rules footballer who played 229 games for West Perth in the WAFL/WANFL from 1922 to 1938. He is a half back flanker in West Perth's official 'Team of the Century'.

Flemming was a versatile player and despite spending much of his career as a defender topped the league's goal kicking in 1925 with 50 goals. A dual West Perth Best and fairest winner, Flemming also won a Sandover Medal in 1930. He captained West Perth in the 1931 season and played in three premiership teams during the 1930s.

He was a regular interstate football representative for Western Australia and played in a variety of positions for his state.

Leading player and coach Johnny Leonard considered Flemming to be one of the most freakish footballers he ever saw, surpassed only by South Melbourne champion full forward Bob Pratt.

Flemming served in the RAAF during World War II based in Eastern Victoria and later worked at Essendon Aerodrome in the early 1960s.
