= 1933 Sydney Carnival =

Tournament information
- Sport: Australian football
- Location: Sydney, Australia
- Dates: 2 August 1933–12 August 1933
- Format: Round Robin
- Teams: 7

Final champion
- Victoria

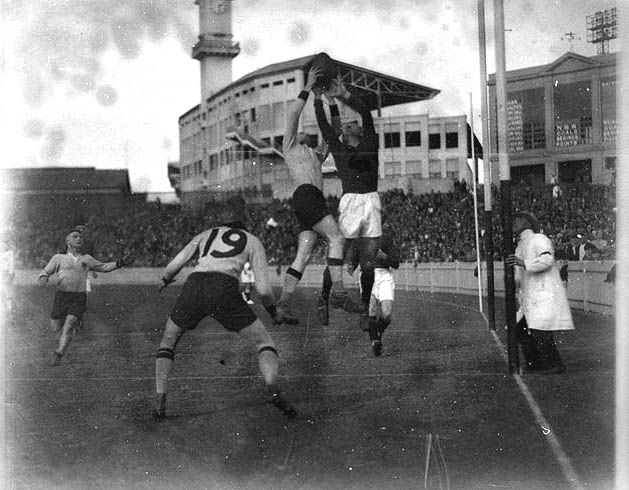
New South Wales player outmarks a West Australian opponent at the SCG

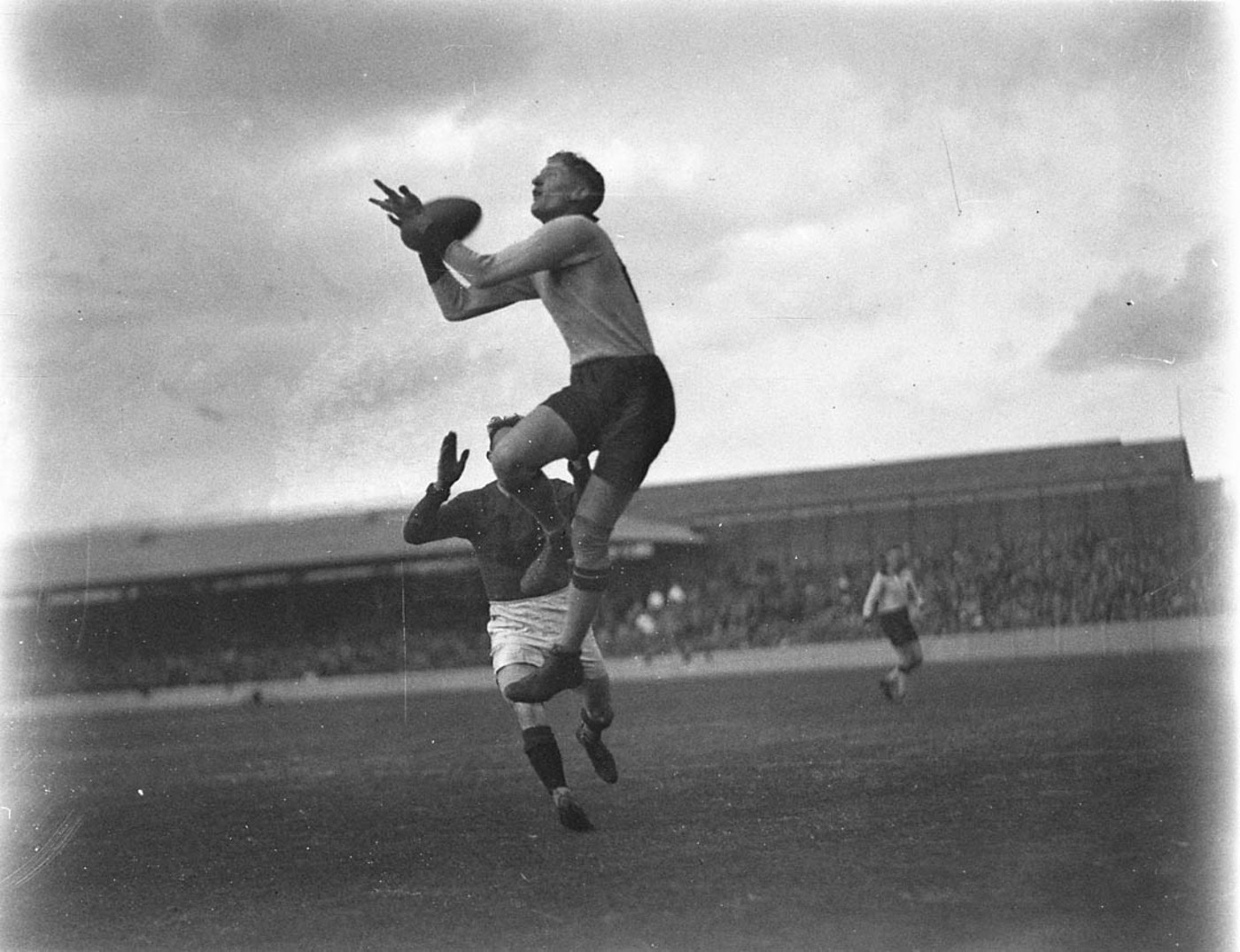
New South Wales player outmarks a West Australian opponent at the SCG

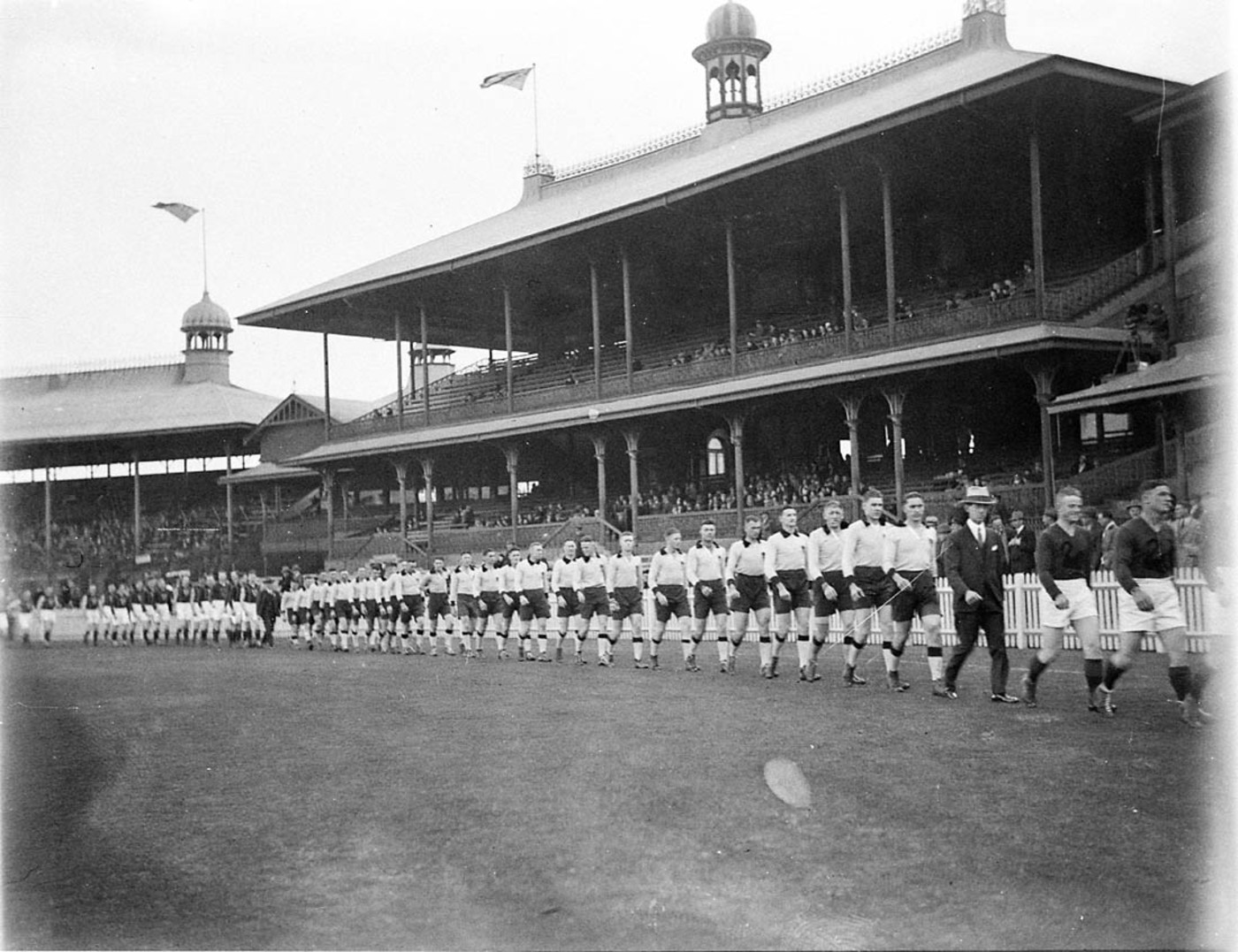
Parade of the New South Wales team

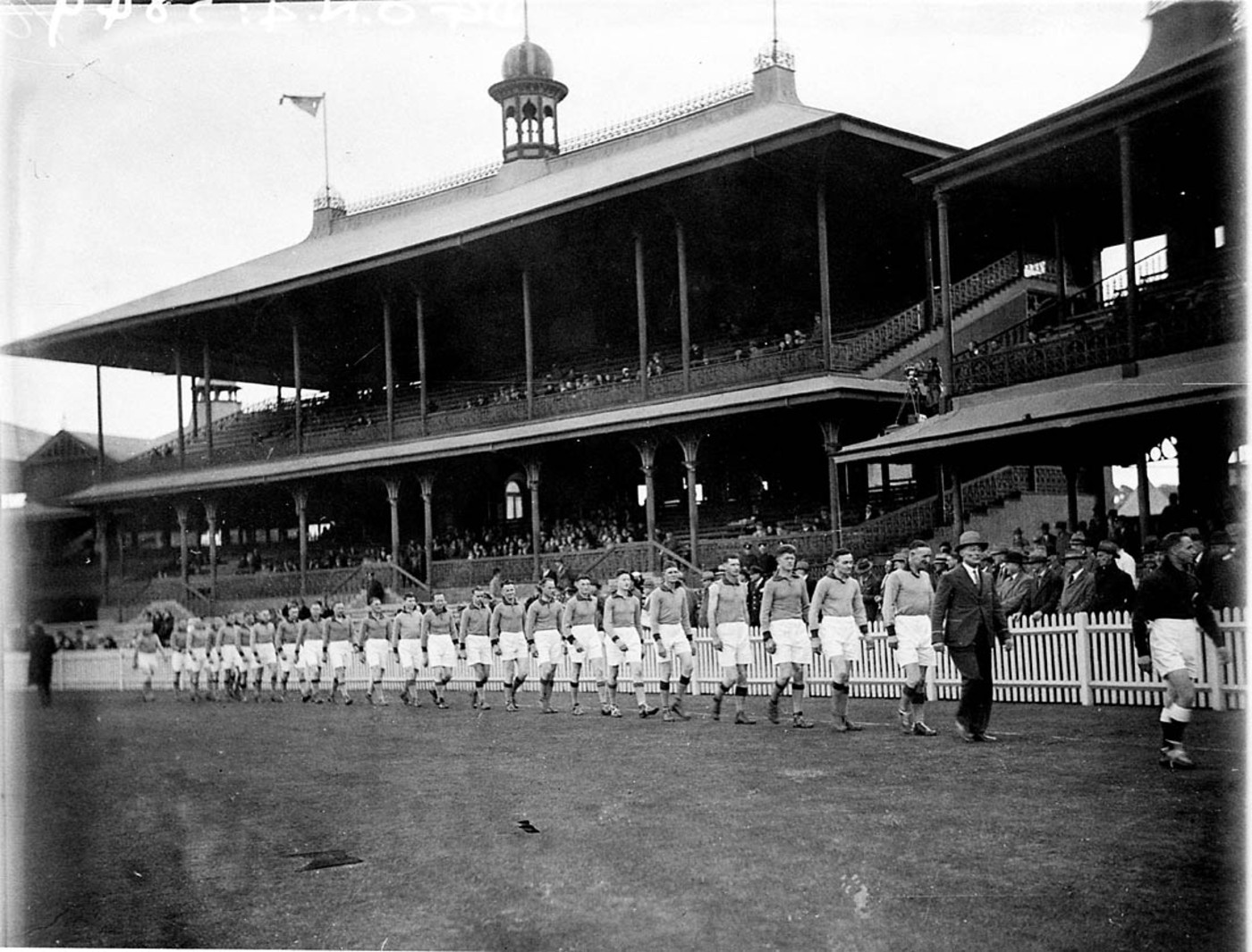
Parade of the ACT team

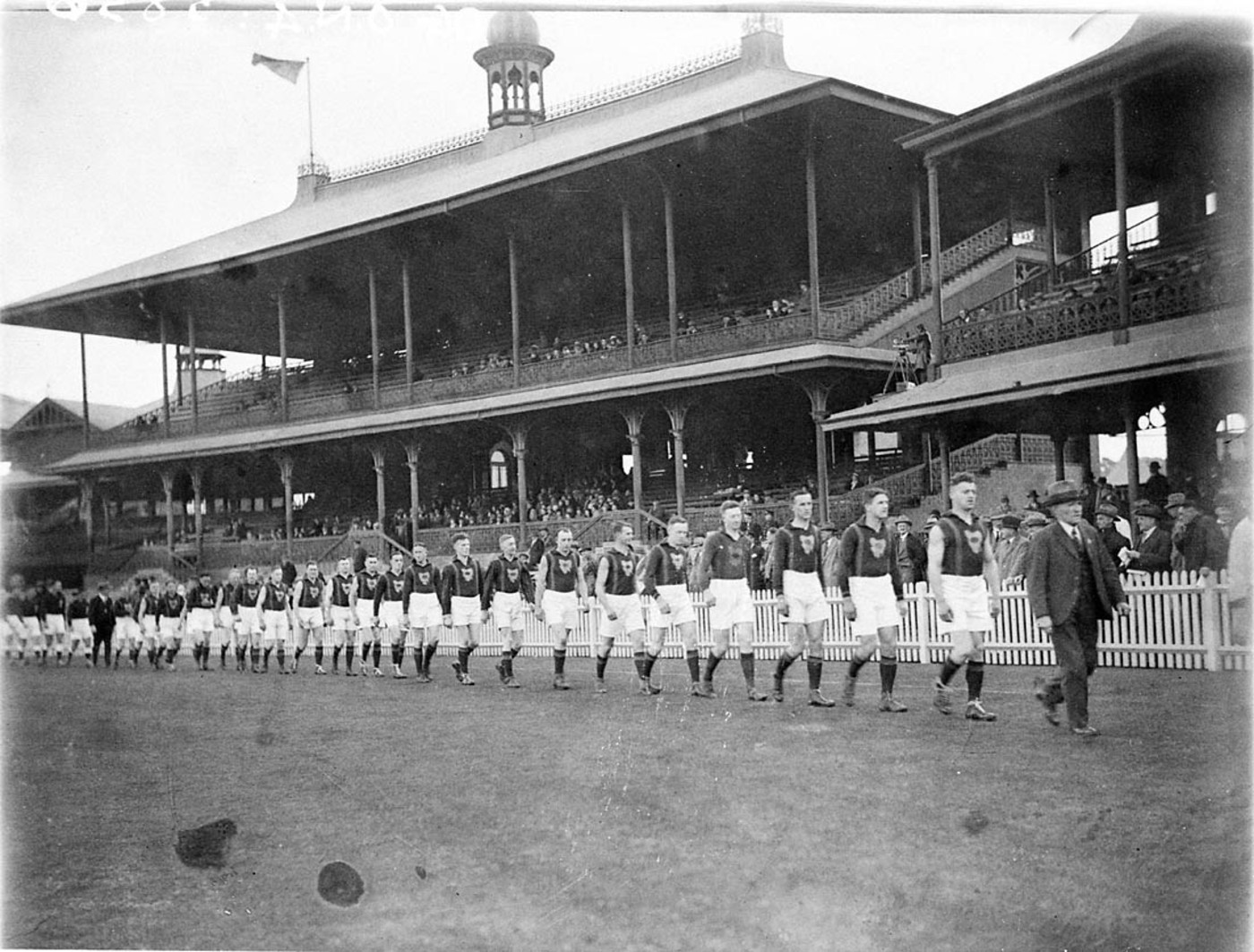
Parade of the Tasmanian team

The 1933 Sydney Carnival was the eighth edition of the Australian National Football Carnival, an Australian football interstate competition. The carnival was held in Sydney over an eleven-day period between Wednesday 2 August and Saturday 12 August.

During the competition, Queensland broke a 20-game carnival losing streak when they accounted for Canberra by 42 points. The Canberrans were competing in their inaugural Australian National Football Carnival.

New South Wales were the better of the weaker set of teams, defeating each of Tasmania, Canberra and Queensland. Once more, South Australian and Western Australia outfits were no match for Victoria.

During the carnival, Australian rules football officials entered a conference with New South Wales Rugby League officials with the view to developing a hybrid between the two sports, known as universal football. A trial match featuring members of the Queensland team was held in private on Friday 11 August, but nothing further came of the proposal.

== Results ==
Winning team	Score	Losing team	Score
Tasmania	31.29 (215)	Canberra	12.5 (77)
South Australia	13.17 (95)	Western Australia	10.24 (84)
Victoria	23.17 (155)	New South Wales	14.18 (102)
New South Wales	19.22 (136)	Queensland	6.15 (51)
Victoria	19.14 (128)	South Australia	17.11 (113)
New South Wales	16.14 (110)	Canberra	12.10 (82)
Victoria	24.16 (160)	Tasmania	15.10 (100)
South Australia	13.18 (96)	Western Australia	12.11 (83)
Queensland	20.16 (136)	Canberra	14.10 (94)
New South Wales	20.12 (132)	Tasmania	15.17 (107)
Victoria	14.16 (100)	Western Australia	12.13 (85)
Tasmania	21.11 (137)	Queensland	7.14 (56)
Western Australia	17.22 (124)	New South Wales	16.18 (114)
Victoria	15.16 (106)	South Australia	9.8 (62)
