= 1930 WAFL season =

Australian rules football season

- Teams: 7
- Premiers: East Fremantle; 15th premiership
- Minor premiers: East Fremantle; 17th minor premiership
- Sandover Medallist: Ted Flemming (West Perth)
- Bernie Naylor Medallist: Frank Hopkins (West Perth)
- Matches played: 66

The 1930 WAFL season was the 46th season of the West Australian Football League in its various incarnations, and the last before it changed its name to the ‘Western Australian National Football League’. The season saw East Fremantle win the premiership for the third consecutive season, marking the second time that the club had achieved the feat; the club was never seriously challenged as the best team except during the interstate break and achieved the unusual feat of being the only club with a percentage of over 100. (Note: The unbeaten Port Adelaide team of 1914 is the only other club to equal this.) Jerry Dolan said in retrospect that East Fremantle's 1930 team was the greatest he had ever played in or coached – including even the unbeaten team of 1946.

As with the VFL, the 1930 WAFL season saw a major innovation with the introduction of a ‘nineteenth man’ who could replace players either injured or out of form. This was changed to a nineteenth and twentieth man in 1946 and to the current interchange system in 1978. A controversial new holding the ball rule, which required the ball to be kicked or punched when tackled, was introduced for this season, but was regarded as unsatisfactory and replaced by the old rule, where a player could kick or drop the ball when tackled, in Victoria from 14 June and throughout Australia from 5 July, with the rule being officially re-amended two weeks later

For 1930 the WAFL reconstituted the seconds competition, which had been inaugurated five seasons beforehand, as the ‘Western Australian National Football Association’ (W.A.N.F.A) and required the teams in this competition to play league players when dropped through loss of form or return of top players.

== Home-and-away season ==
=== Round 1 (Easter weekend) ===
	Round 1
Saturday, 19 April (2:45 pm)	East Fremantle 16.14 (110)	def.	West Perth 12.5 (77)	Fremantle Oval
Saturday, 19 April (2:45 pm)	Perth 10.13 (73)	drew with	Claremont-Cottesloe 11.7 (73)	Perth Oval
Monday, 21 April (2:45 pm)	Subiaco 10.10 (70)	def.	South Fremantle 5.6 (36)	Subiaco Oval
	Bye; East Perth
Claremont-Cottesloe played its first drawn match, and as of 2025 its only one with Perth. (Note: Since this match, Perth has drawn only with West Perth (in 1944, 1960, 1986 and 2008) and with Swan Districts (in 1961, 1971 and 2009).); Subiaco's win over the 1929 runners-up is marred by the controversy of their playing WANFA team captain Snashall in their league team as well as their seconds (who played on the Saturday), which was deemed to be legal at the Tuesday secretaries meeting.

=== Round 2 ===
	Round 2
Saturday, 26 April (2:45 pm)	East Fremantle 14.15 (99)	def.	Subiaco 10.11 (71)	Fremantle Oval
Saturday, 26 April (2:45 pm)	Claremont-Cottesloe 12.10 (82)	def. by	East Perth 17.14 (116)	Claremont Oval
Saturday, 26 April (2:45 pm)	West Perth 5.8 (38)	drew with	South Fremantle 5.8 (38)	Leederville Oval
	Bye; Perth
Two draws in successive rounds is a first in the WA(N)FL repeated only in 1960.

=== Round 3 (Labour Day) ===
	Round 3
Saturday, 3 May (2:45 pm)	East Perth 10.4 (64)	def. by	West Perth 15.16 (106)	Perth Oval
Saturday, 3 May (2:45 pm)	South Fremantle 13.14 (92)	def.	Claremont-Cottesloe 10.10 (70)	Fremantle Oval
Monday, 5 May (2:45 pm)	Subiaco 9.7 (61)	def. by	Perth 8.16 (64)	Subiaco Oval
	Bye; East Fremantle

=== Round 4 ===
	Round 4
Saturday, 10 May (2:45 pm)	Claremont-Cottesloe 8.10 (58)	def. by	East Fremantle 16.16 (112)	Claremont Oval
Saturday, 10 May (2:45 pm)	Perth 9.10 (64)	def. by	West Perth 12.7 (79)	WACA
Saturday, 10 May (2:45 pm)	Subiaco 7.15 (57)	def.	East Perth 6.9 (45)	Subiaco Oval
	Bye; South Fremantle

=== Round 5 ===
	Round 5
Saturday, 17 May (2:45 pm)	West Perth 11.14 (80)	def.	Claremont-Cottesloe 11.11 (77)	Leederville Oval
Saturday, 17 May (2:45 pm)	South Fremantle 13.19 (97)	def.	East Perth 12.10 (82)	Fremantle Oval
Saturday, 17 May (2:45 pm)	Perth 12.14 (86)	def.	East Fremantle 7.9 (51)	WACA
	Bye; Subiaco

=== Round 6 ===
	Round 6
Saturday, 24 May (2:45 pm)	East Perth 8.7 (55)	def. by	East Fremantle 16.12 (108)	Perth Oval
Saturday, 24 May (2:45 pm)	South Fremantle 9.11 (65)	def. by	Perth 13.13 (91)	Fremantle Oval
Saturday, 24 May (2:45 pm)	Subiaco 15.20 (110)	def.	Claremont-Cottesloe 10.8 (68)	Subiaco Oval
	Bye; West Perth

=== Round 7 ===
	Round 7
Saturday, 31 May (2:45 pm)	East Perth 15.17 (107)	def.	Perth 13.14 (92)	Perth Oval
Saturday, 31 May (2:45 pm)	West Perth 17.13 (115)	def.	Subiaco 15.22 (112)	Leederville Oval
Saturday, 31 May (2:45 pm)	South Fremantle 6.10 (46)	def. by	East Fremantle 11.15 (81)	Fremantle Oval
	Bye; Claremont-Cottesloe
Subiaco's 15.22 (112) was a new record for highest losing score in WAFL history; the record stood only until the following round. Despite the weather being mainly fine, the match ended in semi-darkness. (Note: In wet weather before the advent of lights, it was not uncommon for matches to finish in complete darkness, as happened between Perth and East Perth in May 1956.)

=== Round 8 (Foundation Day) ===
	Round 8
Monday, 2 June (2:45 pm)	East Perth 9.5 (59)	def. by	Claremont-Cottesloe 8.13 (61)	Perth Oval
Monday, 2 June (2:45 pm)	Subiaco 11.7 (73)	def. by	East Fremantle 14.20 (104)	Subiaco Oval
Monday, 2 June (2:45 pm)	South Fremantle 18.9 (117)	def.	West Perth 17.12 (114)	Fremantle Oval
	Bye; Perth
West Perth's 17.12 (114) beat Subiaco's two-day-old record for highest losing score in WAFL history.

=== Round 9 ===
	Round 9
Saturday, 7 June (2:45 pm)	West Perth 10.12 (72)	def. by	East Fremantle 21.18 (144)	Leederville Oval
Saturday, 7 June (2:45 pm)	South Fremantle 15.11 (101)	def.	Subiaco 4.15 (39)	Fremantle Oval
Saturday, 7 June (2:45 pm)	Claremont-Cottesloe 12.5 (77)	def. by	Perth 11.15 (81)	Claremont Oval
	Bye; East Perth

=== Round 10 ===
	Round 10
Saturday, 14 June (2:45 pm)	West Perth 14.9 (93)	def. by	East Perth 18.12 (120)	Leederville Oval
Saturday, 14 June (2:45 pm)	Perth 6.16 (52)	def. by	Subiaco 7.14 (56)	WACA
Saturday, 14 June (2:45 pm)	Claremont-Cottesloe 15.18 (108)	def.	South Fremantle 12.3 (75)	Claremont Oval
	Bye; East Fremantle
A wayward second quarter of 2.12 (24) with a strong wind by Perth leaves them insecure in second position, as Subiaco manage to hold them off and enter attack at the finish.

=== Round 11 ===
	Round 11
Saturday, 21 June (2:45 pm)	East Perth 17.13 (115)	def.	Subiaco 4.10 (34)	Perth Oval
Saturday, 21 June (2:45 pm)	West Perth 17.12 (114)	def.	Perth 10.14 (74)	Leederville Oval
Saturday, 21 June (2:45 pm)	East Fremantle 10.15 (75)	def.	Claremont-Cottesloe 7.9 (51)	Fremantle Oval
	Bye; South Fremantle

=== Round 12 ===
	Round 12
Saturday, 28 June (2:45 pm)	East Fremantle 19.15 (129)	def.	Perth 4.15 (39)	Fremantle Oval
Saturday, 28 June (2:45 pm)	Claremont-Cottesloe 11.20 (86)	def. by	West Perth 15.15 (105)	Claremont Oval
Saturday, 28 June (2:45 pm)	East Perth 11.6 (72)	def.	South Fremantle 8.14 (62)	Perth Oval
	Bye; Subiaco
East Fremantle kick 15.5 (95) to 1.7 (13) in a brilliant second half, which not only avenges their only defeat to this point but also drives Perth – second two rounds ago – out of the top four.; West Perth moved into second spot, but it was the club's last win for the season. Frank Hopkins and George Moloney kicked six goals each.

=== Round 13 ===
	Round 13
Saturday, 5 July (2:45 pm)	Perth 7.16 (58)	def.	South Fremantle 3.8 (26)	WACA
Saturday, 5 July (2:45 pm)	East Fremantle 11.10 (76)	def.	East Perth 9.14 (68)	Fremantle Oval
Saturday, 5 July (2:45 pm)	Subiaco 9.9 (63)	def. by	Claremont-Cottesloe 12.13 (85)	Subiaco Oval
	Bye; West Perth
South Fremantle lose their place in the four after kicking what remains their lowest open-age score against Perth since 1918 in extremely wet and muddy conditions.; An inaccurate 2.8 (20) with a strong wind in the final quarter denies East Perth a fine win against the competition leaders, who win their eighth consecutive match to stand fourteen points clear on top.

=== Round 14 ===
	Round 14
Saturday, 12 July (2:45 pm)	Perth 9.15 (69)	def. by	East Perth 12.6 (78)	WACA
Saturday, 12 July (2:45 pm)	East Fremantle 14.19 (103)	def. by	South Fremantle 16.11 (107)	Fremantle Oval
Saturday, 12 July (2:45 pm)	Subiaco 12.12 (84)	def.	West Perth 8.13 (61)	Subiaco Oval
	Bye; Claremont-Cottesloe

=== Round 15 ===
	Round 15
Saturday, 19 July (2:45 pm)	East Fremantle 11.16 (82)	def.	West Perth 8.18 (66)	Fremantle Oval
Saturday, 19 July (2:45 pm)	Perth 12.10 (82)	def. by	Claremont-Cottesloe 15.12 (102)	WACA
Saturday, 19 July (2:45 pm)	Subiaco 8.16 (64)	def. by	South Fremantle 11.7 (73)	Subiaco Oval
	Bye; East Perth
George Moloney becomes the first Claremont player to kick ten goals in a match, as Perth lose their place in the four and Claremont stand half a game from advancing off bottom place. It was Claremont's first win at the W.A.C.A. and moved Moloney to the head of the goalkicking.

=== Round 16 ===
	Round 16
Saturday, 26 July (2:45 pm)	Claremont-Cottesloe 14.10 (94)	def.	East Perth 13.11 (89)	Claremont Oval
Saturday, 26 July (2:45 pm)	Subiaco 9.16 (70)	def.	East Fremantle 8.18 (66)	Subiaco Oval
Saturday, 2 August (2:45 pm)	West Perth 9.10 (64)	def. by	South Fremantle 14.15 (99)	Leederville Oval
	Bye; Perth
With interstate carnival players absent until the middle of August, rounds 16 and 17 were split over three weekends.

=== Round 17 ===
	Round 17
Saturday, 2 August (2:45 pm)	East Fremantle 11.16 (82)	def. by	Perth 16.11 (107)	Fremantle Oval
Saturday, 16 August (2:45 pm)	Claremont-Cottesloe 15.12 (102)	def.	West Perth 14.13 (97)	Subiaco Oval
Saturday, 16 August (2:45 pm)	South Fremantle 13.12 (90)	def.	East Perth 10.25 (85)	Fremantle Oval
	Bye; Subiaco
Subiaco toured the Eastern States during the interstate carnival, and East Fremantle lost a match to combined Goldfields eighteen by the score of 15.13 (103) to 16.15 (111) at Kalgoorlie in rainy weather.

=== Round 18 ===
	Round 18
Saturday, 23 August (2:45 pm)	South Fremantle 12.13 (85)	drew with	Claremont-Cottesloe 13.7 (85)	Fremantle Oval
Saturday, 23 August (2:45 pm)	Perth 14.7 (91)	def.	Subiaco 10.10 (70)	WACA
Saturday, 23 August (2:45 pm)	East Perth 18.8 (116)	def.	West Perth 14.12 (96)	Perth Oval
	Bye; East Fremantle
Claremont-Cottesloe comeback produces third draw for season, an occurrence seen otherwise in the WA(N)FL only in 1937 and 1960.

=== Round 19 ===
	Round 19
Saturday, 30 August (2:45 pm)	Subiaco 18.16 (124)	def.	Claremont-Cottesloe 8.13 (61)	Subiaco Oval
Saturday, 30 August (2:45 pm)	East Fremantle 19.22 (136)	def.	East Perth 5.12 (42)	Fremantle Oval
Saturday, 30 August (2:45 pm)	Perth 8.9 (57)	def. by	South Fremantle 9.13 (67)	WACA
	Bye; West Perth
Claremont-Cottesloe, unbeaten since 28 June, have their finals hopes ended by a resurgent Maroon combination led by six goals from Leonard.; East Fremantle, in their first competition match for a month, return to top form and leave East Perth's finals position in jeopardy with a crushing victory, despite the absence of key players Rowland and Pearce.

=== Round 20 ===
	Round 20
Saturday, 6 September (2:45 pm)	West Perth 7.10 (52)	def. by	Subiaco 8.10 (58)	Leederville Oval
Saturday, 6 September (2:45 pm)	East Perth 13.9 (87)	def.	Perth 8.12 (60)	Perth Oval
Saturday, 6 September (2:45 pm)	East Fremantle 16.18 (114)	def.	South Fremantle 12.7 (79)	Fremantle Oval
	Bye; Claremont-Cottesloe
As a result of Subiaco's fighting win over an improved Cardinal outfit in wet conditions, the final round match will directly decide the fourth finals place should Perth defeat the Cardinals.

=== Round 21 ===
	Round 21
Saturday, 13 September (2:45 pm)	East Perth 12.7 (79)	def. by	Subiaco 15.17 (107)	Perth Oval
Saturday, 13 September (2:45 pm)	West Perth 18.11 (119)	def. by	Perth 24.20 (164)	Leederville Oval
Saturday, 13 September (2:45 pm)	Claremont-Cottesloe 14.10 (94)	def. by	East Fremantle 22.24 (156)	Claremont Oval
	Bye; South Fremantle
After East Fremantle had established a winning advantage, a shootout in the last quarter saw Claremont kick 10.4 (64) (of which George Moloney kicked eight) and East Fremantle 11.5 (71). As of 2022, the aggregate score of 21.9 (135) remains the record for a quarter in elite Australian rules football.; Frank Hopkins (West Perth) kicked twelve goals for the second half to finish with fourteen, the second-highest (Note: Gary Ablett senior equalled Hopkins for Geelong against Essendon in the sixth round of 1993. Ted Tyson would kick 17 for a losing side in the last round of 1938.) for a player on the losing side in elite Australian rules football.; A record crowd (whose exact number was not quantified) sees Subiaco take the final place in the four with an impressive victory that leave critics seeing the Maroons as East Fremantle's most likely challenger.

== Ladder ==
1930 WAFL ladder
Pos	Team	Pld	W	L	D	PF	PA	PP	Pts
1	East Fremantle (P)	18	14	4	0	1828	1261	145.0	56
2	South Fremantle	18	9	7	2	1355	1395	97.1	40
3	Subiaco	18	9	9	0	1323	1367	96.8	36
4	Perth	18	8	9	1	1404	1443	97.3	34
5	East Perth	18	8	10	0	1479	1520	97.3	32
6	Claremont-Cottesloe	18	6	10	2	1434	1674	85.7	28
7	West Perth	18	6	11	1	1548	1711	90.5	26

Rules for classification: 1) points; 2) percentage; 3) number of points for.
(P) Premiers

== Finals ==
=== First semi-final ===
	First semi-final
Saturday, 20 September (2:45 pm)	South Fremantle 11.7 (73)	def.	Subiaco 5.14 (44)	Subiaco Oval (crowd: 7,572)
Sol Lawn kicked eight goals as South recorded a surprise win over the in-form Maroons, whose rucks do not show their dominant recent form.

=== Second semi-final ===
	Second semi-final
Saturday, 27 September (2:45 pm)	East Fremantle 15.14 (104)	def.	Perth 10.14 (74)	Subiaco Oval (crowd: 4,899)
Perth was playing in its first final since 1920.; The Redlegs kicked seven of their ten goals in the second quarter to lead by four points at half time, but were outclassed afterwards.

=== Grand Final ===
1930 WAFL Grand Final
Saturday, 4 October	East Fremantle	def.	South Fremantle	Subiaco Oval (crowd: 7,564)
0.3 (3); 9.9 (63); 9.10 (64); 12.15 (87)	Q1; Q2; Q3; Final	5.6 (36); 5.7 (37); 7.10 (52); 9.11 (65)	Umpires: F Collins
Bee 2, Lethbridge 2, Glass 2, Laffin 2, Butcher, Telfer, Laurie, Woods	Goals	Sol Lawn 3, McGuinness 2, Smith 2, Clatworthy, E. Lawn
Reynolds (best on ground), Jarvis, Richards, Gabrielson, Laffin, Bee, Jones	Best	Holt, Loveridge, Hicks, Sol Lawn, E. Lawn, Clatworthy
On a very windy day, East Fremantle won with nine goals to none in the second quarter, after South Fremantle had established a five-goal lead in the first quarter, but failed to use the wind well in the third term.; During the final quarter, East Fremantle became the first WAFL team to score 2,000 points in one season.
