= 1936 WANFL season =

Australian rules football season

- Teams: 8
- Premiers: East Perth; 8th premiership
- Minor premiers: East Fremantle; 22nd minor premiership
- Sandover Medallist: George Moloney (Claremont)
- Leading goalkicker: George Doig (East Fremantle)
- Matches played: 84

The 1936 WANFL season was the 52nd season of the Western Australian National Football League. The most conspicuous features were the rise of Claremont to their first finals appearance since entering the WAFL ten years beforehand after having won only forty (plus two draws) of its first 183 games, and the thrilling finals series in which East Perth rose to their first premiership for nine years after holding on to a thrilling struggle for fourth position where all eight clubs were in the running well into August, then winning two finals by a solitary point. In the process the Royals set a record for the most losses by an eventual premiership club in major Australian Rules leagues, (Note: Since equalled by East Fremantle in 1965, Glenelg in 1986 and Adelaide in 1998) but won their last open-age premiership until 1956. The Royals overcame much adversity to win the premiership, including a crippling injury toll and a schedule modified to allow them to tour Victoria, South Australia and Tasmania between 4 July and the first week of August.

George Moloney, famous as a prolific goalscorer with Geelong, aided Claremont's rise in his new role as a centreman and won the club's fourth Sandover Medal in five seasons, whilst former West Perth key forward Frank Hopkins took Moloney's place at the goalfront to great effect.

West Perth, who had won three premierships during the previous four seasons, began a short but extraordinarily steep decline this season, not returning to the finals until 1941 (when they won another premiership) and suffering two wooden spoons and twenty-seven consecutive losses.

Victoria Park, wooden spooners in 1935, reverted to the club's traditional name of 'Perth' after Parliament failed to pass an Act to allow them to acquire Raphael Park to develop a new oval. After a poor beginning the Redlegs improved, but were not again to contest open-age finals until they began three decades of only briefly interrupted success in 1947.

Off the field, 1936 saw the WANFL establish permanent headquarters at Subiaco Oval, whilst the Grand Final was the first game with a new grandstand at the ground.

== Home-and-away season ==
=== Round 1 (Labour Day) ===
	Round 1
Saturday, 2 May (2:45 pm)	South Fremantle 13.15 (93)	def. by	Swan Districts 18.16 (124)	Fremantle Oval
Saturday, 2 May (2:45 pm)	Claremont 12.14 (86)	def.	East Fremantle 9.15 (69)	Claremont Oval
Saturday, 2 May (2:45 pm)	East Perth 21.20 (146)	def.	Perth 15.7 (97)	Perth Oval
Monday, 4 May (2:45 pm)	Subiaco 12.19 (91)	def.	West Perth 9.8 (62)	Subiaco Oval
Claremont immediately show they will be much stronger with the return of George Moloney and the recruitment of several players from other WANFL clubs.

=== Round 2 ===
	Round 2
Saturday, 9 May (2:45 pm)	East Fremantle 20.18 (138)	def.	Perth 12.14 (86)	Fremantle Oval
Saturday, 9 May (2:45 pm)	Claremont 10.10 (70)	def. by	East Perth 12.15 (87)	Claremont Oval
Saturday, 9 May (2:45 pm)	West Perth 15.7 (97)	def. by	South Fremantle 16.23 (119)	Leederville Oval
Saturday, 9 May (2:45 pm)	Swan Districts 16.12 (108)	def.	Subiaco 12.9 (81)	Bassendean Oval

=== Round 3 ===
	Round 3
Saturday, 16 May (2:45 pm)	Swan Districts 13.7 (85)	def.	Claremont 10.11 (71)	Bassendean Oval
Saturday, 16 May (2:45 pm)	South Fremantle 10.15 (75)	def.	East Fremantle 8.15 (63)	Fremantle Oval
Saturday, 16 May (2:45 pm)	Perth 8.16 (64)	def. by	West Perth 18.11 (119)	WACA
Saturday, 16 May (2:45 pm)	East Perth 5.13 (43)	def. by	Subiaco 7.4 (46)	Perth Oval
In a round of vigorous play despite favourable conditions, Subiaco inflict the injury-depleted Royals' first loss and the reigning premiers gain their first win.

=== Round 4 ===
	Round 4
Saturday, 23 May (2:45 pm)	East Fremantle 18.21 (129)	def.	Swan Districts 10.6 (66)	Fremantle Oval
Saturday, 23 May (2:45 pm)	West Perth 10.13 (73)	def. by	East Perth 11.14 (80)	Leederville Oval
Saturday, 23 May (2:45 pm)	Subiaco 8.8 (56)	def. by	Perth 13.10 (88)	Subiaco Oval
Saturday, 23 May (2:45 pm)	Claremont 13.7 (85)	def.	South Fremantle 11.13 (79)	Claremont Oval
In a round of upsets, Perth convincingly defeats the Maroons with Bert Gook scoring eight goals

=== Round 5 ===
	Round 5
Saturday, 30 May (2:45 pm)	East Perth 11.11 (77)	def.	East Fremantle 11.10 (76)	Perth Oval
Saturday, 30 May (2:45 pm)	Perth 4.19 (43)	def. by	Claremont 17.9 (111)	WACA
Saturday, 30 May (2:45 pm)	West Perth 13.14 (92)	def.	Swan Districts 10.16 (76)	Leederville Oval
Saturday, 30 May (2:45 pm)	South Fremantle 11.22 (88)	def. by	Subiaco 15.14 (104)	Fremantle Oval
East Perth wins a thriller in wet conditions in a match notable for East Fremantle beginning the game two players short.

=== Round 6 (Foundation Day) ===
	Round 6
Monday, 1 June (2:45 pm)	Claremont 9.18 (72)	def.	West Perth 8.8 (56)	Claremont Oval
Monday, 1 June (2:45 pm)	South Fremantle 15.12 (102)	def.	East Perth 7.15 (57)	Fremantle Oval
Monday, 1 June (2:45 pm)	Swan Districts 16.14 (110)	def.	Perth 14.12 (96)	Bassendean Oval
Monday, 1 June (2:45 pm)	Subiaco 10.7 (67)	def. by	East Fremantle 13.7 (85)	Subiaco Oval
In extremely wet conditions with 48.5 millimetres (1.91 in) of rain in Perth, South Fremantle gain their third win with a 5.1 (31) to 1.3 (9) last quarter into a strong northwesterly wind.

=== Round 7 ===
	Round 7
Saturday, 6 June (2:45 pm)	East Fremantle 13.10 (88)	def.	West Perth 12.13 (85)	Fremantle Oval
Saturday, 6 June (2:45 pm)	Subiaco 12.14 (86)	def. by	Claremont 21.12 (138)	Subiaco Oval
Saturday, 6 June (2:45 pm)	East Perth 20.16 (136)	def.	Swan Districts 14.10 (94)	Perth Oval
Saturday, 6 June (2:45 pm)	Perth 21.13 (139)	def.	South Fremantle 15.16 (106)	WACA
East Fremantle come back from thirty-eight points behind after an early last quarter goal by Ted Tyson to snatch victory over the Cardinals.; With Gook kicking ten and moving to only four behind George Doig, Perth convincingly beat South Fremantle.

=== Round 8 ===
	Round 8
Saturday, 13 June (2:45 pm)	Perth 9.18 (72)	def. by	East Perth 11.10 (76)	WACA
Saturday, 13 June (2:45 pm)	West Perth 19.15 (129)	def.	Subiaco 4.7 (31)	Leederville Oval
Saturday, 13 June (2:45 pm)	Swan Districts 8.14 (62)	def. by	South Fremantle 11.13 (79)	Bassendean Oval
Saturday, 13 June (2:45 pm)	East Fremantle 13.14 (92)	def.	Claremont 10.11 (71)	Fremantle Oval
Tyson kicks twelve goals, five behinds as West Perth rebound in spectacular fashion over Subiaco, who do not goal after midway through the first quarter.

=== Round 9 ===
	Round 9
Saturday, 20 June (2:45 pm)	Subiaco 16.10 (106)	def.	Swan Districts 15.11 (101)	Subiaco Oval
Saturday, 20 June (2:45 pm)	South Fremantle 8.12 (60)	def. by	West Perth 18.9 (117)	Fremantle Oval
Saturday, 20 June (2:45 pm)	East Perth 15.17 (107)	def.	Claremont 12.16 (88)	Perth Oval
Saturday, 20 June (2:45 pm)	Perth 13.18 (96)	def.	East Fremantle 12.17 (89)	WACA
West Perth continue their return to top form, whilst Perth cling to a seven-point lead for the last few minutes against a strong-finishing Old Easts outfit.

=== Round 10 ===
	Round 10
Saturday, 27 June (2:45 pm)	East Fremantle 14.14 (98)	def.	South Fremantle 13.8 (86)	Fremantle Oval
Saturday, 27 June (2:45 pm)	West Perth 14.18 (102)	def.	Perth 13.12 (90)	Leederville Oval
Saturday, 27 June (2:45 pm)	Subiaco 17.14 (116)	def.	East Perth 10.13 (73)	Subiaco Oval
Saturday, 27 June (2:45 pm)	Claremont 15.19 (109)	def. by	Swan Districts 20.11 (131)	Claremont Oval
Subiaco wins well over league leaders East Perth, so depleted that coach Jerry Dolan was forced to play.

=== Round 11 ===
	Round 11
Saturday, 4 July (2:45 pm)	East Perth 6.10 (46)	def. by	West Perth 13.10 (88)	Perth Oval
Saturday, 4 July (2:45 pm)	South Fremantle 14.12 (96)	def.	Claremont 11.20 (86)	Fremantle Oval
Saturday, 4 July (2:45 pm)	Swan Districts 9.20 (74)	def.	East Fremantle 9.16 (70)	Bassendean Oval
Saturday, 4 July (2:45 pm)	Perth 8.16 (64)	def. by	Subiaco 13.8 (86)	WACA
West Perth continue their surge to move to second position after a wasteful first half by both teams, with Max Tetley and Ted Flemming impregnable in defence.; Swan Districts come back to beat East Fremantle for the first time in their three seasons in the WANFL. In the reserves, (Note: Then called the 'Association') however, East Fremantle, playing as 'North East Fremantle', kick an astonishing 52.20 (332), which remains the record for any grade of WANFL football.

=== Round 12 ===
	Round 12
Saturday, 11 July (2:45 pm)	Swan Districts 10.16 (76)	def.	West Perth 9.10 (64)	Bassendean Oval
Saturday, 11 July (2:45 pm)	East Fremantle 13.14 (92)	def.	East Perth 12.13 (85)	Fremantle Oval
Saturday, 11 July (2:45 pm)	Claremont 16.14 (110)	def.	Perth 15.7 (97)	Claremont Oval
Saturday, 11 July (2:45 pm)	Subiaco 14.22 (106)	def.	South Fremantle 7.16 (58)	Subiaco Oval

=== Interstate match ===
Interstate match
Saturday, 18 July (2:45 pm)	Western Australia	def.	South Australia	Subiaco Oval (crowd: 20,000)
2.9 (21); 8.13 (61); 12.17 (89); 15.22 (112)	Q1; Q2; Q3; Final	2.1 (13); 5.7 (37); 5.11 (41); 8.18 (66)	Umpires: Val Sparrow
Doig 4, McDiarmid 3, Truscott 2, Marinko 2, Hooper 2, Gook 2	Goals	Tully 2, Schultz 2, Dermody, Munro, Johnston, Quinn
Marinko (best on ground), Clarke, Lou Daily, Birmingham, Tetley, Krepp, Gook	Best	Tully, Biggs, Burton, Quinn, Reval, Dermody
Western Australia's greater speed and dash assures it of an easy victory in perfect conditions over the visitors.

=== Round 13 ===
	Round 13
Monday, 29 June (2:45 pm)	South Fremantle 20.3 (123)	def.	East Perth 14.14 (98)	Subiaco Oval
Saturday, 25 July (2:45 pm)	East Fremantle 15.16 (106)	def.	Subiaco 15.12 (102)	Fremantle Oval
Saturday, 25 July (2:45 pm)	West Perth 17.21 (123)	def.	Claremont 7.18 (60)	Leederville Oval
Saturday, 25 July (2:45 pm)	Perth 13.14 (92)	def.	Swan Districts 8.11 (59)	WACA
The match between South Fremantle and East Perth was uniquely played on a working day afternoon to allow the Royals' tour of the eastern States.; South Fremantle kick the most accurate score in WANFL history to that point despite very windy conditions, beating 13.2 (80) by West Perth against Perth in 1902.; In the later games, East Fremantle take top place from the Royals whilst the latter lose by ten points to a combined Tasmanian team.

=== Round 14 (Labour Day) ===
	Round 14
Monday, 4 May (2:45 pm)	Swan Districts 12.12 (84)	def. by	East Perth 14.18 (102)	Bassendean Oval
Saturday, 1 August (2:45 pm)	Claremont 9.11 (65)	def. by	Subiaco 13.9 (87)	Claremont Oval
Saturday, 1 August (2:45 pm)	West Perth 9.4 (58)	def. by	East Fremantle 12.17 (89)	Leederville Oval
Saturday, 1 August (2:45 pm)	South Fremantle 4.8 (32)	def. by	Perth 8.12 (60)	Fremantle Oval
The match at Bassendean was put forward to allow East Perth's tour of the eastern States.; In wet conditions, East Fremantle overwhelm a West Perth side with 9.7 (61) to 3.1 (19) in the second half to take top spot from East Perth, who lose their last tour match by thirteen points to a North Tasmanian team.

=== Round 15 ===
	Round 15
Saturday, 8 August (2:45 pm)	Claremont 13.13 (91)	def.	East Fremantle 12.7 (79)	Claremont Oval
Saturday, 8 August (2:45 pm)	South Fremantle 13.13 (91)	def. by	Swan Districts 17.10 (112)	Fremantle Oval
Saturday, 8 August (2:45 pm)	East Perth 15.10 (100)	def. by	Perth 17.11 (113)	Perth Oval
Saturday, 8 August (2:45 pm)	Subiaco 18.9 (117)	def.	West Perth 11.14 (80)	Subiaco Oval
Claremont, after six losses in seven games, rebound to defeat East Fremantle in an exceptional standard game.; The round's results remarkably leave only three wins separating the eight clubs with five matches remaining, and have Swan Districts in the box seat for a maiden finals berth in its third season.

=== Round 16 ===
	Round 16
Saturday, 15 August (2:45 pm)	Claremont 12.9 (81)	def.	Swan Districts 7.12 (54)	Claremont Oval
Saturday, 15 August (2:45 pm)	East Perth 12.15 (87)	def. by	Subiaco 15.13 (103)	Perth Oval
Saturday, 15 August (2:45 pm)	East Fremantle 11.17 (83)	def.	South Fremantle 9.8 (62)	Fremantle Oval
Saturday, 15 August (2:45 pm)	Perth 7.10 (52)	def. by	West Perth 7.13 (55)	WACA
Longtime leader East Perth falls out of the four, whilst Claremont defeat and displace Swan Districts – both seeking a first finals appearance.

=== Round 17 ===
	Round 17
Saturday, 22 August (2:45 pm)	Perth 14.5 (89)	def.	Subiaco 7.18 (60)	WACA
Saturday, 22 August (2:45 pm)	Swan Districts 9.7 (61)	def. by	East Fremantle 15.10 (100)	Bassendean Oval
Saturday, 22 August (2:45 pm)	East Perth 12.7 (79)	def.	West Perth 5.15 (45)	Perth Oval
Saturday, 22 August (2:45 pm)	South Fremantle 5.7 (37)	def. by	Claremont 7.14 (56)	Fremantle Oval
Greater accuracy allows East Perth to rebound from six consecutive losses in a fiery match.; With eight straight goals in the second half, Perth move off the bottom and loosen Subiaco's hold on the double chance.

=== Round 18 ===
	Round 18
Saturday, 29 August (2:45 pm)	East Fremantle 21.11 (137)	def.	East Perth 7.12 (54)	Fremantle Oval
Saturday, 29 August (2:45 pm)	Subiaco 16.17 (113)	def.	South Fremantle 13.8 (86)	Subiaco Oval
Saturday, 29 August (2:45 pm)	Claremont 15.17 (107)	def.	Perth 11.6 (72)	Claremont Oval
Saturday, 29 August (2:45 pm)	West Perth 16.19 (115)	def.	Swan Districts 14.5 (89)	Leederville Oval
With George Doig kicking eleven goals, East Fremantle produce the finest display of the season to displace the Royals from the four due to a poor percentage.

=== Round 19 ===
	Round 19
Saturday, 5 September (2:45 pm)	West Perth 11.15 (81)	def. by	Claremont 12.13 (85)	Leederville Oval
Saturday, 5 September (2:45 pm)	East Fremantle 14.10 (94)	def.	Subiaco 13.7 (85)	Fremantle Oval
Saturday, 5 September (2:45 pm)	East Perth 15.19 (109)	def.	South Fremantle 10.11 (71)	Perth Oval
Saturday, 5 September (2:45 pm)	Perth 22.14 (146)	def.	Swan Districts 11.5 (71)	WACA
Claremont secure their first WANFL finals berth with a thrilling win over West Perth in a match with many missed opportunities at the finish – and with Subiaco's loss in a tough match gain a strong chance of claiming second position.

=== Round 20 ===
	Round 20
Saturday, 12 September (2:45 pm)	West Perth 11.11 (77)	def. by	East Fremantle 14.13 (97)	Leederville Oval
Saturday, 12 September (2:45 pm)	Subiaco 8.9 (57)	def. by	Claremont 12.18 (90)	Subiaco Oval
Saturday, 12 September (2:45 pm)	South Fremantle 8.6 (54)	def. by	Perth 11.22 (88)	Fremantle Oval
Saturday, 12 September (2:45 pm)	Swan Districts 9.11 (65)	def.	East Perth 8.15 (63)	Bassendean Oval
Claremont beat Subiaco in a match that determined who took second position and the double chance in the finals.; An East Fremantle rally in the third quarter ensures East Perth remain in the top four despite kicking 2.8 (20) with the wind in the second quarter and failing to catch Swan Districts in the last.

== Ladder ==
1936 ladder
Pos	Team	Pld	W	L	D	PF	PA	PP	Pts
1	East Fremantle	20	14	6	0	1874	1544	121.4	56
2	Claremont	20	12	8	0	1732	1618	107.0	48
3	Subiaco	20	11	9	0	1700	1734	98.0	44
4	East Perth (P)	20	10	10	0	1705	1755	97.2	40
5	West Perth	20	9	11	0	1718	1561	110.1	36
6	Perth	20	9	11	0	1744	1787	97.6	36
7	Swan Districts	20	9	11	0	1702	1916	88.8	36
8	South Fremantle	20	6	14	0	1597	1857	86.0	24

Rules for classification: 1) points; 2) percentage; 3) number of points for.
(P) Premiers

== Finals ==
=== First semi-final ===
	First semi-final
Saturday, 19 September (2:45 pm)	Subiaco 5.16 (46)	def. by	East Perth 6.11 (47)	Subiaco Oval (crowd: 8,133)
After Subiaco take the lead despite scoring only two goals in three-quarters, East Perth rebound for a stirring victory.

=== Second semi-final ===
	Second semi-final
Saturday, 26 September (2:45 pm)	East Fremantle 9.20 (74)	def. by	Claremont 11.13 (79)	Subiaco Oval (crowd: 11,482)
George Doig misses a late shot that could have drawn the match, and Claremont win their first final.

=== Preliminary final ===
	Preliminary final
Saturday, 3 October (2:45 pm)	East Fremantle 14.13 (97)	def. by	East Perth 14.14 (98)	Subiaco Oval (crowd: 10,079)
Herb Screigh wins a third successive thrilling final with a goal after the siren. East Fremantle were leading by thirteen points with five minutes remaining.

== Grand final ==
1936 WANFL Grand Final
Saturday, 10 October (2:45 pm)	Claremont	def. by	East Perth	Subiaco Oval (crowd: 20,874)
1.2 (8); 5.2 (32); 6.5 (41); 9.6 (60)	Q1; Q2; Q3; Final	6.2 (38); 6.3 (39); 7.3 (45); 11.5 (71)	Umpires: Sparrow
Hopkins 3, Boys 2, Cook 2, Hooper, Robert Moloney	Goals	Dolan 4, Screaigh 2, Mussman 2, Parry, Cronin, Lockyer
Clarke, Headon, Birmingham, Reeves, George Moloney, Batt	Best	Hall, Miller, Graham, Crow, Starr, Parry
Hooper (shoulder)	Injuries
Despite kicking only 1.1 in the second and third quarters, East Perth win another exciting match with a fine last quarter into a strong breeze.
