= 1938 WANFL season =

Australian rules football season

- Teams: 8
- Premiers: Claremont; 1st premiership
- Minor premiers: East Fremantle; 23rd minor premiership
- Sandover Medallist: Haydn Bunton, Sr. (Subiaco)
- Leading goalkicker: Ted Tyson (West Perth)
- Matches played: 85

The 1938 WANFL season was the 54th season of the Western Australian National Football League, and saw Claremont, under champion coach Johnny Leonard who had transferred from West Perth, win its first premiership after losing two Grand Finals and drawing the first one this season. The blue and golds were to win the following two premierships before a long period near the foot of the ladder after Claremont Oval was gutted by a fire in 1944.

1938 also saw triple Brownlow Medallist Haydn Bunton senior, enticed by the offer of employment, move to Subiaco and win the first of three Sandovers in only four seasons in Perth; however his presence overshadowed the rest of the team and the Maroons were to advance only one place compared to 1937, being handicapped by the loss of champion defender Lou Daily to the Goldfields where he led Mines Rovers to several premierships. West Perth, who under Leonard and Jack Cashman had won three premierships earlier in the decade, had a disastrous time and finished the season with twelve consecutive losses despite the brilliant form of goalsneak Ted Tyson, who set numerous records in the final round and finished as leading goalkicker.

Swan Districts, in a last promising season before descending for two decades to the status of perennial easybeats, achieved a notable feat in becoming the first club to hold George Doig and then Ted Tyson goalless during a match.

A number of notable club tours took place during July, with mid-table VFL club St. Kilda touring Albany, Kalgoorlie and Perth, whilst East Fremantle embarked on a lengthy tour of the Eastern States and Perth made a shorter tour of rural Western Australia. Old Easts' tour saw them lose narrowly to a team from Broken Hill but convincingly defeat a local team from Sydney the following week and a combined St. Kilda/Melbourne team by forty-three points in Victoria on the last Saturday of July.

== Home-and-away season ==
=== Round 1 ===
	Round 1
Saturday, 23 April (2:45 pm)	Perth 23.17 (155)	def.	West Perth 14.12 (96)	WACA
Saturday, 23 April (2:45 pm)	East Fremantle 17.10 (112)	def.	South Fremantle 10.5 (65)	Fremantle Oval
Saturday, 23 April (2:45 pm)	Claremont 16.15 (111)	def.	Swan Districts 14.11 (95)	Claremont Oval
Saturday, 23 April (2:45 pm)	East Perth 11.17 (83)	def. by	Subiaco 14.14 (98)	Perth Oval
1937 wooden spooners Subiaco, despite Bunton still not having a clearance, beat perennial finalists East Perth, with Les Hardiman a matchwinner.

=== Round 2 ===
	Round 2
Saturday, 30 April (2:45 pm)	Subiaco 13.18 (96)	def.	West Perth 12.9 (81)	Subiaco Oval
Saturday, 30 April (2:45 pm)	East Perth 16.20 (116)	def.	Perth 6.8 (44)	Perth Oval
Saturday, 30 April (2:45 pm)	Claremont 19.12 (126)	def.	East Fremantle 13.12 (90)	Claremont Oval
Saturday, 30 April (2:45 pm)	South Fremantle 13.7 (85)	def. by	Swan Districts 13.17 (95)	Fremantle Oval
Perth lose century goalkicker Gook to a serious wrist injury as East Perth rebound from their Subiaco loss.

=== Round 3 ===
	Round 3
Saturday, 7 May (2:45 pm)	Swan Districts 9.8 (62)	def. by	East Fremantle 10.19 (79)	Bassendean Oval
Saturday, 7 May (2:45 pm)	South Fremantle 27.19 (181)	def.	Claremont 15.20 (110)	Fremantle Oval
Saturday, 7 May (2:45 pm)	West Perth 10.14 (74)	def.	East Perth 9.15 (69)	Leederville Oval
Saturday, 7 May (2:45 pm)	Subiaco 18.12 (120)	def.	Perth 12.20 (92)	Subiaco Oval
George Doig is goalless for the only time in 202 games for East Fremantle, whilst rival Holdsworth kicks eight of Swans' nine, yet East Fremantle's superior on-ball division wins.; South Fremantle kick their highest score to that point with Chandler kicking 13.7 (85) against the dual grand finalists. The score remains the third-highest against an eventual premier club in major Australian Rules leagues. (Note: The only higher scores against an eventual premier club are Port Adelaide's 33.19 (217) against Glenelg in the third round of the 1934 SANFL season, and Sturt's 29.16 (190) against West Adelaide in the eighth round of the 1983 season. Both these, ironically, were kicked by the teams who would be defeated in the respective grand finals.); Bunton kicks six in his first appearance for Subiaco, who become the solitary undefeated club after three weeks.

=== Round 4 ===
	Round 4
Saturday, 14 May (2:45 pm)	Claremont 15.14 (104)	def.	Subiaco 12.12 (84)	Claremont Oval
Saturday, 14 May (2:45 pm)	East Perth 11.12 (78)	def. by	Swan Districts 13.12 (90)	Perth Oval
Saturday, 14 May (2:45 pm)	Perth 20.18 (138)	def.	South Fremantle 16.14 (110)	WACA
Saturday, 14 May (2:45 pm)	East Fremantle 21.12 (138)	def.	West Perth 12.8 (80)	Fremantle Oval
Claremont end Subiaco's unbeaten run, whilst Perth, with Grigg taking the place of Gook and kicking eight, bring South Fremantle to earth.

=== Round 5 ===
	Round 5
Saturday, 21 May (2:45 pm)	Swan Districts 15.10 (100)	def.	Perth 11.9 (75)	Bassendean Oval
Saturday, 21 May (2:45 pm)	South Fremantle 14.15 (99)	def.	East Perth 13.15 (93)	Fremantle Oval
Saturday, 21 May (2:45 pm)	Claremont 19.18 (132)	def.	West Perth 17.10 (112)	Claremont Oval
Saturday, 21 May (2:45 pm)	Subiaco 11.13 (79)	def. by	East Fremantle 12.14 (86)	Subiaco Oval
East Fremantle hold off Subiaco (without Hardiman) in a brilliant match to move clear at the top of the table.

=== Round 6 ===
	Round 6
Saturday, 28 May (2:45 pm)	East Perth 21.17 (143)	def.	Claremont 20.5 (125)	Perth Oval
Saturday, 28 May (2:45 pm)	Subiaco 10.15 (75)	def. by	Swan Districts 13.19 (97)	Subiaco Oval
Saturday, 28 May (2:45 pm)	South Fremantle 20.25 (145)	def.	West Perth 13.14 (92)	Fremantle Oval
Saturday, 28 May (2:45 pm)	Perth 12.17 (89)	def.	East Fremantle 10.11 (71)	WACA
For the first time in WANFL history, both teams score twenty goals in a match, and East Perth's first quarter of 10.5 (65) is enough to rebound from a poor start to the season. (Note: Until the end of July, East Fremantle had played two extra games and East Perth and Perth one extra game to allow Old Easts to tour the eastern states that month.)

=== Round 7 ===
	Round 7
Saturday, 4 June (2:45 pm)	West Perth 13.10 (88)	def.	Swan Districts 10.14 (74)	Leederville Oval
Saturday, 4 June (2:45 pm)	East Perth 9.12 (66)	drew with	East Fremantle 9.12 (66)	Perth Oval
Saturday, 4 June (2:45 pm)	Perth 17.9 (111)	def.	Claremont 13.12 (90)	WACA
Saturday, 4 June (2:45 pm)	Subiaco 23.15 (153)	def.	South Fremantle 15.20 (110)	Subiaco Oval

=== Round 8 (Foundation Day) ===
	Round 8
Monday, 6 June (2:45 pm)	Swan Districts 13.17 (95)	def.	Claremont 9.10 (64)	Bassendean Oval
Monday, 6 June (2:45 pm)	South Fremantle 14.14 (98)	def. by	East Fremantle 14.15 (99)	Fremantle Oval
Monday, 6 June (2:45 pm)	Subiaco 8.12 (60)	def. by	East Perth 16.10 (106)	Subiaco Oval
Monday, 6 June (2:45 pm)	West Perth 13.9 (87)	def.	Perth 5.16 (46)	Leederville Oval
East Fremantle kick one point against three misses from deadly rival South Fremantle in their second consecutive thriller.; West Perth win their last match before losing twenty-seven consecutively, the equal longest losing streak in WA(N)FL history and at the time beating Subiaco's 24 straight losses in 1902 and 1903.

=== Round 9 ===
	Round 9
Saturday, 11 June (2:45 pm)	East Fremantle 15.12 (102)	def.	Claremont 13.16 (94)	Fremantle Oval
Saturday, 11 June (2:45 pm)	Perth 12.13 (85)	def.	East Perth 11.15 (81)	WACA
Saturday, 11 June (2:45 pm)	Swan Districts 25.24 (174)	def.	South Fremantle 14.18 (102)	Bassendean Oval
Saturday, 11 June (2:45 pm)	West Perth 20.7 (127)	def. by	Subiaco 20.14 (134)	Leederville Oval
Swan Districts kick its highest score until 1961, with Holdsworth kicking eleven goals and Park seven. In the last three quarters Swans kicked 23.22 (160) to 9.12 (66).; With the return of Gook, Perth jump East Perth and rebound to challenge for only their third finals berth in eighteen seasons.

=== Round 10 ===
	Round 10
Saturday, 18 June (2:45 pm)	East Perth 22.17 (149)	def.	West Perth 12.7 (79)	Perth Oval
Saturday, 18 June (2:45 pm)	Claremont 13.18 (96)	def.	South Fremantle 12.12 (84)	Claremont Oval
Saturday, 18 June (2:45 pm)	Perth 15.7 (97)	def.	Subiaco 13.16 (94)	WACA
Saturday, 18 June (2:45 pm)	East Fremantle 13.11 (89)	def. by	Swan Districts 14.15 (99)	Fremantle Oval
A comeback win from Swan Districts effectively places them on top of the table, with Old Easts having played two more matches due to their forthcoming tour interstate.; With 8.1 (49) from captain-coach Robertson in a tricky wind, Perth consolidate their place in the four.

=== Round 11 ===
	Round 11
Saturday, 25 June (2:45 pm)	West Perth 14.11 (95)	def. by	East Fremantle 14.13 (97)	Leederville Oval
Saturday, 25 June (2:45 pm)	Subiaco 15.7 (97)	def. by	Claremont 23.9 (147)	Subiaco Oval
Saturday, 25 June (2:45 pm)	South Fremantle 17.15 (117)	def.	Perth 16.12 (108)	Fremantle Oval
Saturday, 25 June (2:45 pm)	Swan Districts 7.16 (58)	def. by	East Perth 14.13 (97)	Bassendean Oval
Ted Tyson kicks ten goals to begin a brilliant finish to the season, but East Fremantle just manage to overcome the struggling Cardinals.

=== Round 12 ===
	Round 12
Saturday, 2 July (2:45 pm)	East Perth 17.14 (116)	def.	South Fremantle 11.12 (78)	Perth Oval
Saturday, 2 July (2:45 pm)	West Perth 12.7 (79)	def. by	Claremont 18.17 (125)	Leederville Oval
Saturday, 2 July (2:45 pm)	Perth 11.9 (75)	def.	Swan Districts 7.14 (56)	WACA
Saturday, 2 July (2:45 pm)	East Fremantle 11.12 (78)	def.	Subiaco 10.10 (70)	Fremantle Oval
An umpires' strike affects this round, but at one game players actually congratulate the replacements.

=== Round 13 ===
	Round 13
Saturday, 9 July (2:45 pm)	South Fremantle 13.20 (98)	def.	East Fremantle 10.12 (72)	Fremantle Oval
Saturday, 9 July (2:45 pm)	Claremont 19.10 (124)	def.	Swan Districts 15.9 (99)	Claremont Oval
Saturday, 9 July (2:45 pm)	Perth 16.14 (110)	def.	West Perth 9.8 (62)	WACA
Saturday, 9 July (2:45 pm)	East Perth 12.10 (82)	def.	Subiaco 9.13 (67)	Perth Oval

=== St. Kilda Tour Match ===
	Western Australian Second XVIII v St. Kilda
Saturday, 16 July (2:45 pm)	Western Australia Second XVIII 20.16 (136)	def.	St Kilda 13.14 (92)	Subiaco Oval (crowd: 15,322)
Handicapped by injury, St. Kilda are no match for a West Australian Second Eleven, for whom Bunton and Shea of Subiaco shows their best form and Swans' Zilko keeps Mohr quiet.

=== Round 14 (Labour Day) ===
	Round 14
Monday, 2 May (2:45 pm)	East Fremantle 17.16 (118)	def.	East Perth 8.12 (60)	Subiaco Oval
Saturday, 23 July (2:45 pm)	South Fremantle 17.15 (117)	def.	Subiaco 15.12 (102)	Fremantle Oval
Saturday, 23 July (2:45 pm)	Claremont 17.17 (119)	def.	Perth 6.14 (50)	Claremont Oval
Saturday, 23 July (2:45 pm)	Swan Districts 11.18 (84)	def.	West Perth 7.9 (51)	Bassendean Oval
East Fremantle's match with East Perth is moved forward to Labour Day to allow a tour of the Eastern States.; Tyson is kept goalless for the first time in his 167th match for West Perth by Andrew Zilko of Swan Districts.; Former Sandover winner Ted Flemming makes a comeback for the Cardinals, handicapped by injuries to key players Rainoldi, Anderson, Marinko, McDiarmid and Braun.; A new grandstand was opened at Bassendean Oval during the half-time interval.

=== Round 15 (Easter Monday) ===
	Round 15
Monday, 18 April (2:45 pm)	East Fremantle 22.15 (147)	def.	Perth 13.12 (90)	Fremantle Oval
Saturday, 30 July (2:45 pm)	Swan Districts 11.21 (87)	def.	Subiaco 10.11 (71)	Bassendean Oval
Saturday, 30 July (2:45 pm)	West Perth 13.12 (90)	def. by	South Fremantle 19.12 (126)	Leederville Oval
Saturday, 30 July (2:45 pm)	Claremont 15.15 (105)	def.	East Perth 11.8 (74)	Claremont Oval
To allow East Fremantle to tour the Eastern States, the game with Perth is moved to Easter Monday, a week before the normal beginning of the season.

=== Round 16 ===
	Round 16
Saturday, 6 August (2:45 pm)	Claremont 12.7 (79)	def. by	East Fremantle 13.10 (88)	Claremont Oval
Saturday, 6 August (2:45 pm)	Subiaco 21.7 (133)	def.	West Perth 15.10 (100)	Subiaco Oval
Saturday, 6 August (2:45 pm)	South Fremantle 12.13 (85)	def.	Swan Districts 9.9 (63)	Fremantle Oval
Saturday, 6 August (2:45 pm)	East Perth 11.9 (75)	def. by	Perth 15.14 (104)	Perth Oval
South Fremantle press for their first finals appearance since 1932 by beating Swan Districts at Fremantle for the first time since Swans entered the WANFL.

=== Round 17 ===
	Round 17
Saturday, 13 August (2:45 pm)	South Fremantle 14.18 (102)	def.	Claremont 8.10 (58)	Fremantle Oval
Saturday, 13 August (2:45 pm)	East Perth 10.20 (80)	def.	West Perth 11.7 (73)	Perth Oval
Saturday, 13 August (2:45 pm)	Swan Districts 8.11 (59)	def. by	East Fremantle 14.19 (103)	Bassendean Oval
Saturday, 13 August (2:45 pm)	Perth 7.15 (57)	def. by	Subiaco 14.5 (89)	WACA
Bert Chandler becomes the first South Fremantle player to kick 100 goals and the sixth different player in two seasons, beating Holdsworth and Tyson who finish the round with tallies of 98 and 97 respectively.; An accurate Subiaco inflict Perth's first loss on the WACA ground to push that latter club to fifth with three rounds remaining.; On Saturday 20 August there was a rest from WANFL football as a schoolboys' carnival used Subiaco Oval.

=== Round 18 ===
	Round 18
Saturday, 27 August (2:45 pm)	South Fremantle 23.16 (154)	def.	Perth 9.20 (74)	Fremantle Oval
Saturday, 27 August (2:45 pm)	Swan Districts 10.9 (69)	def. by	East Perth 21.15 (141)	Bassendean Oval
Saturday, 27 August (2:45 pm)	Subiaco 16.14 (110)	def. by	Claremont 19.17 (131)	Subiaco Oval
Saturday, 27 August (2:45 pm)	West Perth 10.5 (65)	def. by	East Fremantle 12.22 (94)	Leederville Oval
South Fremantle crush Perth for a sixth straight win and suddenly have a chance of second position, being a game and three percent behind Claremont with two games to play.; East Perth, with Lockyer holding Holdsworth goalless, record a crushing win to leave Swan Districts out of the four.; Ted Tyson kicks his hundredth goal for the fifth straight season with seven in a valiant effort by the undermanned Cardinals, who lose their tenth game in succession.

=== Round 19 ===
	Round 19
Saturday, 3 September (2:45 pm)	East Fremantle 21.12 (138)	def.	Subiaco 14.18 (102)	Fremantle Oval
Saturday, 3 September (2:45 pm)	East Perth 15.17 (107)	def.	South Fremantle 9.10 (64)	Perth Oval
Saturday, 3 September (2:45 pm)	West Perth 12.6 (78)	def. by	Claremont 20.20 (140)	Leederville Oval
Saturday, 3 September (2:45 pm)	Perth 12.11 (83)	def. by	Swan Districts 18.14 (122)	WACA
East Perth end South Fremantle's run with a superb last quarter, whereby veteran follower Jerry Dolan moves up forward to kick seven goals.; In a match which determines who will drop out of the running for the finals, Swan Districts comfortably defeat Perth.

=== Round 20 ===
	Round 20
Saturday, 10 September (2:45 pm)	Subiaco 16.12 (108)	def.	South Fremantle 13.14 (92)	Subiaco Oval
Saturday, 10 September (2:45 pm)	West Perth 18.7 (115)	def. by	Swan Districts 18.15 (123)	Leederville Oval
Saturday, 10 September (2:45 pm)	Claremont 16.16 (112)	def.	Perth 12.14 (86)	Claremont Oval
Saturday, 10 September (2:45 pm)	East Fremantle 13.18 (96)	def.	East Perth 14.10 (94)	Fremantle Oval
In an extraordinary match at Leederville, Swan Districts, after being outplayed for three quarters, kick 11.4 (70) to 7.1 (43) in a last quarter described as "lacking in zest" to take South Fremantle's place in the four. At the time it was the second highest-scoring quarter in WANFL history, and it remains the highest for any quarter at Leederville.; Ted Tyson, who displaced Chandler at the head of the goalkicking, set numerous records with his 17.5 (107): 1. The most goals for a losing side in any senior Australian Rules league, beating Frank Hopkins' record of 14 in 1930.; 2. The most goals by a player who kicked all but one of his team's goals, beating Allan Evans' thirteen for Perth in 1921 against East Fremantle.; 3. The most goals for West Perth in any match, beating his own record of fifteen against Claremont-Cottesloe in 1934.; Subiaco's surprise win over South Fremantle ensures East Perth remain in the four despite just failing to catch East Fremantle.

== Ladder ==
1938 WANFL ladder
Pos	Team	Pld	W	L	D	PF	PA	PP	Pts
1	East Fremantle	20	15	4	1	1963	1670	117.5	62
2	Claremont (P)	20	13	7	0	2192	1960	111.8	52
3	Swan Districts	20	11	9	0	1801	1791	100.6	44
4	East Perth	20	10	9	1	1910	1652	115.6	42
5	South Fremantle	20	10	10	0	2112	2060	102.5	40
6	Perth	20	9	11	0	1769	2018	87.7	36
7	Subiaco	20	8	12	0	1942	2012	96.5	32
8	West Perth	20	3	17	0	1724	2250	76.6	12

Rules for classification: 1) points; 2) percentage; 3) number of points for.
(P) Premiers

== Finals ==
=== First semi-final ===
	First semi-final
Saturday, 17 September (2:45 pm)	Swan Districts 9.11 (65)	def. by	East Perth 8.18 (66)	Subiaco Oval (crowd: 9,618)
East Perth win a thrilling final with a succession of behinds into a strong wind.

=== Second semi-final ===
	Second semi-final
Saturday, 24 September (2:45 pm)	East Fremantle 13.18 (96)	def. by	Claremont 17.19 (121)	Subiaco Oval (crowd: 10,428)
Claremont run away in the third quarter and comfortably hold off Old Easts to reach their third consecutive grand final.

=== Preliminary final ===
	Preliminary final
Saturday, 1 October (2:45 pm)	East Fremantle 15.9 (99)	def.	East Perth 9.13 (67)	Subiaco Oval (crowd: 12,786)
In an extremely spiteful game with numerous clashes, East Fremantle kick 11.1 (67) to 1.8 (14) after half-time for a second successive showdown against Claremont.

=== Grand Final ===
1938 WANFL Grand Final
Saturday, 8 October (2:45 pm)	Claremont	drew with	East Fremantle	Subiaco Oval (crowd: 19,104)
4.2 (26); 9.6 (60); 10.12 (72); 13.16 (94)	Q1; Q2; Q3; Final	3.5 (23); 6.7 (43); 10.8 (68); 14.10 (94)	Umpires: Owens
Compton 4, O‘Reilly 4, Hooper, Menhennett, Heusler, Reeves, Lovegrove	Goals	George Doig 5, McGlinn 4, Wendt 2, Gabrielson 2, Daniell
Gibson, Reeves, Sutherland, Lovegrove, O‘Neill, Compton	Best	Hutchinson (best on ground), McGlinn, George Doig, Briggs, Daniell, Gabrielson, Charlie Doig
East Fremantle come back from nineteen points down midway through the last quarter to force a replay. It was the league's second Grand Final draw, but the last senior WA(N)FL finals draw until 1989.

=== Grand Final replay ===
1938 WANFL Grand Final replay
Saturday, 15 October (2:45 pm)	Claremont	def.	East Fremantle	Subiaco Oval (crowd: 15,402)
2.9 (21); 6.9 (45); 11.12 (78); 14.17 (101)	Q1; Q2; Q3; Final	0.1 (1); 6.12 (48); 9.13 (67); 11.13 (79)	Umpires: Owens
O‘Reilly 3, Serjeant 3, Compton 3, Reeves, Gibson, Hunter, Hooper, George Moloney	Goals	George Doig 5, Donegan 3, McPharlin, Daniell
Reeves, George Moloney, Lovegrove, Reid, Syd Moloney, Headon, Hooper	Best	N. Doig, Charles Doig, Hutchinson, George Doig, Donegan
Compton (leg)	Injuries	Kingsbury (leg)
O‘Reilly for fighting with Daniell	Reports	Daniell for fighting with O‘Reilly
Claremont's dominance in the ruck and its greater pace and stamina allow it to win its first premiership at its fourth attempt.
