= 1933 WANFL season =

Australian rules football season

- Teams: 7
- Premiers: East Fremantle; 17th premiership
- Minor premiers: East Fremantle; 20th minor premiership
- Sandover Medallist: Sammy Clarke (Claremont-Cottesloe)
- Leading goalkicker: George Doig (East Fremantle)
- Matches played: 67

The 1933 WANFL season was the 49th season of the Western Australian National Football League in its various incarnations. It was the last year of a seven-team senior competition, and saw George Doig, during the second semi-final, become the first player to kick one hundred goals in a season.

The premiership was won by East Fremantle, who claimed its sixth straight minor premiership, after it defeated fourth-placed Subiaco in the Grand Final. Subiaco's feat in reaching the premiership decider was itself a remarkable one, given that the Victorian Football League had deprived it of the majority of it star players: only six of its 1931 Grand Final team played in the corresponding match two seasons later, and the Maroons had been last or second last for most of 1933 before entering the four at the last minute. Old Easts led all season: despite losing a number of key players to the Sydney Carnival during July and August, the blue and whites won two of three games when depleted.

Claremont-Cottesloe finished with its third consecutive wooden spoon, but defender "Sammy" Clarke became the first player to win the Sandover Medal in his debut season.

== Home-and-Away season ==
=== Round 1 (Labour Day) ===
	Round 1
Saturday, 29 April (2:45 pm)	Subiaco 8.15 (63)	def. by	Perth 11.8 (74)	Subiaco Oval
Saturday, 29 April (2:45 pm)	East Fremantle 13.16 (94)	def.	East Perth 11.11 (77)	Fremantle Oval
Monday, 1 May (2:45 pm)	West Perth 10.13 (73)	def. by	South Fremantle 13.12 (90)	Leederville Oval
	Bye; Claremont-Cottesloe
George Doig began his record-breaking season with nine goals.

=== Round 2 ===
	Round 2
Saturday, 6 May (2:45 pm)	Claremont-Cottesloe 9.8 (62)	def. by	West Perth 10.7 (67)	Claremont Oval
Saturday, 6 May (2:45 pm)	East Fremantle 16.12 (108)	def.	Subiaco 15.10 (100)	Fremantle Oval
Saturday, 6 May (2:45 pm)	Perth 8.9 (57)	def. by	East Perth 17.14 (116)	WACA
	Bye; South Fremantle

=== Round 3 ===
	Round 3
Saturday, 13 May (2:45 pm)	East Perth 14.22 (106)	def.	Claremont-Cottesloe 11.9 (75)	Perth Oval
Saturday, 13 May (2:45 pm)	South Fremantle 9.11 (65)	def. by	Subiaco 14.18 (102)	Fremantle Oval
Saturday, 13 May (2:45 pm)	West Perth 24.9 (153)	def.	Perth 9.7 (61)	Leederville Oval
	Bye; East Fremantle
Ted Tyson kicked thirteen goals for the Cardinals, who surpass their highest league score, beating a previous best of 18.20 (128) against Claremont-Cottesloe in 1926 and becoming the last of the seven WANFL teams to kick their first 20-goal score. (Note: The other pre-1934 clubs' first 20-goal scores were: Perth – 25.24 (174) v Subiaco in 1904; East Fremantle – 21.11 (137) v Midland Junction in 1905; Subiaco – 20.15 (135) v West Perth in 1913; South Fremantle – 22.15 (147) v Midland Junction in 1916; East Perth – 21.8 (134) v West Perth in 1926; Claremont-Cottesloe – 21.14 (140) v East Perth in 1929. North Fremantle kicked its only 20-goal score of 25.24 (174) against Subiaco as early as 1902.)

=== Round 4 ===
	Round 4
Saturday, 20 May (2:45 pm)	East Perth 20.17 (137)	def.	South Fremantle 7.5 (47)	Perth Oval
Saturday, 20 May (2:45 pm)	Claremont-Cottesloe 9.14 (68)	def.	Subiaco 7.14 (56)	Claremont Oval
Saturday, 20 May (2:45 pm)	East Fremantle 9.15 (69)	def.	West Perth 6.9 (45)	Fremantle Oval
	Bye; Perth
A determined and eager Royals team – chastened by its poor early-game form against Claremont-Cottesloe – inflicts South Fremantle's worst defeat and the Royals' biggest win since the second round of 1918 and the biggest win in the league since the Royals lost to East Fremantle by 94 points in 1930.

=== Round 5 ===
	Round 5
Saturday, 27 May (2:45 pm)	South Fremantle 11.18 (84)	def.	Claremont-Cottesloe 8.9 (57)	Fremantle Oval
Saturday, 27 May (2:45 pm)	Perth 9.17 (71)	def. by	East Fremantle 14.15 (99)	WACA
Saturday, 27 May (2:45 pm)	Subiaco 7.20 (62)	def. by	East Perth 11.11 (77)	Subiaco Oval
	Bye; West Perth

=== Round 6 ===
	Round 6
Saturday, 3 June (2:45 pm)	Perth 9.11 (65)	def. by	Claremont-Cottesloe 13.10 (88)	WACA
Saturday, 3 June (2:45 pm)	South Fremantle 8.7 (55)	def. by	East Fremantle 12.7 (79)	Fremantle Oval
Saturday, 3 June (2:45 pm)	West Perth 10.10 (70)	def.	East Perth 7.8 (50)	Perth Oval
	Bye; Subiaco
East Perth forward pocket R. Forden becomes probably the first WANFL player to play in headgear, in the process arousing considerable comment from the press.; On Foundation Day, a match between ‘Coastal' and ‘Goldfields' teams was held, with the Coastal team winning 18.14 (122) to 5.9 (39) in heavy rain

=== Round 7 ===
	Round 7
Saturday, 10 June (2:45 pm)	South Fremantle 17.14 (116)	def.	Perth 20.23 (143)	Fremantle Oval
Saturday, 10 June (2:45 pm)	East Fremantle 13.17 (95)	def.	Claremont-Cottesloe 7.14 (56)	Claremont Oval
Saturday, 10 June (2:45 pm)	Subiaco 11.11 (77)	def. by	West Perth 15.12 (102)	Subiaco Oval
	Bye; East Perth

=== Round 8 ===
	Round 8
Saturday, 17 June (2:45 pm)	Perth 9.7 (61)	def. by	Subiaco 13.15 (93)	WACA
Saturday, 17 June (2:45 pm)	South Fremantle 12.16 (88)	def.	West Perth 10.19 (79)	Fremantle Oval
Saturday, 17 June (2:45 pm)	East Perth 12.21 (93)	def. by	East Fremantle 16.14 (110)	Perth Oval
	Bye; Claremont-Cottesloe

=== Round 9 ===
	Round 9
Saturday, 24 June (2:45 pm)	Subiaco 9.20 (74)	def.	East Fremantle 10.6 (66)	Subiaco Oval
Saturday, 24 June (2:45 pm)	West Perth 14.16 (100)	def.	Claremont-Cottesloe 10.13 (73)	Leederville Oval
Saturday, 24 June (2:45 pm)	East Perth 17.15 (117)	def.	Perth 16.12 (108)	Perth Oval
	Bye; South Fremantle
The dominance of youngsters Smith and Bant in the ruck and the leadership of Stewart Daily allows Subiaco – last after the clubs had met each other once – to inflict East Fremantle's first loss in a scrappy game.

=== Round 10 ===
	Round 10
Saturday, 1 July (2:45 pm)	Claremont-Cottesloe 12.9 (81)	def. by	East Perth 13.6 (84)	Claremont Oval
Saturday, 1 July (2:45 pm)	Perth 3.7 (25)	def. by	West Perth 5.15 (45)	WACA
Saturday, 1 July (2:45 pm)	Subiaco 6.11 (47)	def. by	South Fremantle 7.10 (52)	Subiaco Oval
	Bye; East Fremantle
On a sodden, windswept WACA after heavy early rain, Perth's score was the lowest of the season and the smallest against West Perth since Subiaco kicked 2.8 (20) in 1922.; A misguided attempt by a defender to charge through a pack of opponents near goal costs Subiaco the match as a holding-the-ball decision gives South Fremantle the winning goal of a thrilling, skilful match almost on the bell.

=== Round 11 ===
	Round 11
Saturday, 8 July (2:45 pm)	West Perth 12.19 (91)	def.	East Fremantle 9.8 (62)	Leederville Oval
Saturday, 8 July (2:45 pm)	Subiaco 6.11 (47)	def. by	Claremont-Cottesloe 9.6 (60)	Subiaco Oval
Saturday, 8 July (2:45 pm)	South Fremantle 12.21 (93)	def. by	East Perth 14.13 (97)	Fremantle Oval
	Bye; Perth

=== Round 12 ===
	Round 12
Saturday, 15 July (2:45 pm)	East Fremantle 16.12 (108)	def.	Perth 15.8 (98)	Fremantle Oval
Saturday, 15 July (2:45 pm)	East Perth 16.12 (108)	def.	Subiaco 11.20 (86)	Perth Oval
Saturday, 15 July (2:45 pm)	Claremont-Cottesloe 11.13 (79)	def.	South Fremantle 8.14 (62)	Claremont Oval
	Bye; West Perth
Bottom side Perth trailed East Fremantle by 39 points at three-quarter time; Perth mounted a comeback, kicking nine goals straight in the final quarter, but fell ten points short.

=== Round 13 ===
	Round 13
Saturday, 22 July (2:45 pm)	West Perth 14.12 (96)	def.	East Perth 13.13 (91)	Leederville Oval
Saturday, 22 July (2:45 pm)	Claremont-Cottesloe 9.8 (62)	def. by	Perth 11.12 (78)	Claremont Oval
Saturday, 22 July (2:45 pm)	East Fremantle 16.13 (109)	def.	South Fremantle 12.9 (81)	Fremantle Oval
	Bye; Subiaco
West Perth defeated East Perth after being in defence all of the last quarter then kicking two late goals. The winner from Frank Hopkins came when Royal defender Glew did not hear a "play on" call.

=== Round 14 ===
	Round 14
Saturday, 29 July (2:45 pm)	East Fremantle 18.10 (118)	def.	Claremont-Cottesloe 10.6 (66)	Fremantle Oval
Saturday, 29 July (2:45 pm)	Perth 17.13 (115)	def.	South Fremantle 11.18 (84)	WACA
Saturday, 29 July (2:45 pm)	West Perth 9.13 (67)	def.	Subiaco 7.15 (57)	Leederville Oval
	Bye; East Perth

=== Round 15 ===
	Round 15
Saturday, 5 August (2:45 pm)	Subiaco 19.12 (126)	def.	Perth 14.11 (95)	Subiaco Oval
Saturday, 5 August (2:45 pm)	West Perth 14.12 (96)	def.	South Fremantle 11.8 (74)	Leederville Oval
Saturday, 5 August (2:45 pm)	East Fremantle 20.20 (140)	def.	East Perth 11.14 (80)	Fremantle Oval
	Bye; Claremont-Cottesloe
With George Doig kicking nine to overtake Ted Tyson on the goalkicking, East Perth fall two games behind West Perth in the battle for the double chance as East Fremantle do not feel the loss of captain-coach Dolan and three other representatives.; Subiaco's win over Perth leaves the last four clubs separated only by percentage, and provides a tense fight for the final berth in the top four after the interstate players return.

=== Round 16 ===
	Round 16
Saturday, 12 August (2:45 pm)	Subiaco 12.13 (85)	def.	East Fremantle 12.10 (82)	Subiaco Oval
Saturday, 12 August (2:45 pm)	Claremont-Cottesloe 10.8 (68)	def. by	West Perth 14.9 (93)	Claremont Oval
Saturday, 12 August (2:45 pm)	Perth 13.17 (95)	def.	East Perth 13.8 (86)	WACA
	Bye; South Fremantle
Subiaco, two weeks after being last, moved up to fourth with a second narrow win over East Fremantle.

=== Round 17 ===
	Round 17
Saturday, 19 August (2:45 pm)	West Perth 9.13 (67)	def. by	Perth 12.17 (89)	Leederville Oval
Saturday, 19 August (2:45 pm)	South Fremantle 18.12 (120)	def.	Subiaco 7.16 (58)	Fremantle Oval
Saturday, 19 August (2:45 pm)	Claremont-Cottesloe 9.6 (60)	def. by	East Perth 14.17 (101)	Claremont Oval
	Bye; East Fremantle

=== Round 18 ===
	Round 18
Saturday, 26 August (2:45 pm)	Claremont-Cottesloe 10.10 (70)	def. by	East Fremantle 13.5 (83)	Claremont Oval
Saturday, 26 August (2:45 pm)	West Perth 11.10 (76)	def.	Subiaco 9.14 (68)	Leederville Oval
Saturday, 26 August (2:45 pm)	South Fremantle 14.13 (97)	def.	Perth 12.12 (84)	Fremantle Oval
	Bye; East Perth
South Fremantle staged a comeback to defeat Perth after trailing by six goals. It was the biggest half-time deficit any team had overcome to win since 1912, and allows the red and whites to retake Subiaco's place in the four.

=== Round 19 ===
	Round 19
Saturday, 2 September (2:45 pm)	East Perth 11.13 (79)	def. by	Subiaco 15.11 (101)	Perth Oval
Saturday, 2 September (2:45 pm)	South Fremantle 8.13 (61)	def. by	Claremont-Cottesloe 9.17 (71)	Fremantle Oval
Saturday, 2 September (2:45 pm)	Perth 11.15 (81)	def. by	East Fremantle 19.20 (134)	WACA
	Bye; West Perth

=== Round 20 ===
	Round 20
Saturday, 9 September (2:45 pm)	Perth 13.16 (94)	def.	Claremont-Cottesloe 6.13 (49)	WACA
Saturday, 9 September (2:45 pm)	East Perth 9.5 (59)	def. by	West Perth 8.14 (62)	Perth Oval
Saturday, 9 September (2:45 pm)	South Fremantle 11.15 (81)	def. by	East Fremantle 16.14 (110)	Fremantle Oval
	Bye; Subiaco
Perth's win ended Claremont-Cottesloe's chances of a maiden finals berth.; George Doig kicked ten goals to break the home-and-away season record tally of ninety held by South Fremantle's Sol Lawn and displace the red and whites from the four.

=== Round 21 ===
	Round 21
Saturday, 16 September (2:45 pm)	East Perth 10.12 (72)	def. by	South Fremantle 12.17 (89)	Perth Oval
Saturday, 16 September (2:45 pm)	East Fremantle 17.15 (117)	def.	West Perth 12.15 (87)	Fremantle Oval
Saturday, 16 September (2:45 pm)	Subiaco 13.25 (103)	def.	Claremont-Cottesloe 10.5 (65)	Subiaco Oval
	Bye; Perth
George Doig becomes the first WANFL player to kick 100 goals when he kicks the fifth of seven in the last quarter of a second-semi preview that shows Old Easts ahead of the Cardinals in preparation.

== Ladder ==
1933 WANFL ladder
Pos	Team	Pld	W	L	D	PF	PA	PP	Pts
1	East Fremantle (P)	18	15	3	0	1783	1391	128.2	60
2	West Perth	18	13	5	0	1469	1280	114.8	52
3	East Perth	18	9	9	0	1630	1526	106.8	36
4	Subiaco	18	7	11	0	1405	1425	98.6	28
5	South Fremantle	18	7	11	0	1439	1608	89.5	28
6	Perth	18	7	11	0	1494	1703	87.7	28
7	Claremont-Cottesloe	18	5	13	0	1210	1497	80.8	20

Rules for classification: 1) points; 2) percentage; 3) number of points for.
(P) Premiers

== Finals ==
=== First semi-final ===
	First semi-final
Saturday, 23 September (2:45 pm)	East Perth 8.14 (62)	def. by	Subiaco 12.15 (87)	Leederville Oval (crowd: 9,240)
Subiaco's much greater pace allowed it to comfortably beat the Royals in warm conditions with an excellent third quarter

=== Second semi-final ===
	Second semi-final
Saturday, 30 September (2:45 pm)	East Fremantle 16.9 (105)	def.	West Perth 13.8 (86)	Subiaco Oval (crowd: 11,894)
Old Easts came back from a three-goal half-time deficit to reverse the 1932 second-semi result although Benton holds George Doig to 2.3 (15).

=== Preliminary final ===
	Preliminary final
Saturday, 7 October (2:45 pm)	West Perth 13.8 (86)	def. by	Subiaco 13.12 (90)	Subiaco Oval (crowd: 10,468)
Subiaco establish a lead of 48 points in their best first quarter until the second round of 1986 leading 9.8 (62) to 2.0 (12); West Perth mounted a strong comeback, but fell four points short

=== Grand Final ===
1933 WANFL Grand Final
Saturday, 14 October (2:45 pm)	East Fremantle	def.	Subiaco	Subiaco Oval (crowd: 15,919)
1.4 (10); 4.9 (33); 6.11 (47); 10.13 (73)	Q1; Q2; Q3; Final	2.5 (17); 3.7 (25); 5.7 (37); 7.7 (49)	Umpires: F Collins
Butcher 5, George Doig 2, McGlinn, Kingsbury, Reynolds	Goals	Gilbert 2, Merson, Nissen, Smith, Toll
Jarvis (best on ground), W. James, Woods, Dolan, Reynolds, McGlinn, Charlie Doig	Best	Mackay, Ahearn, Smith, Merson, Bant, Davies
Injuries	Strack (shoulder)
On a sultry day that reached 83 °F (28.3 °C) during the match, Subiaco fight with extreme pluck but the work of previous weeks gives the Maroons little chance against their fresh and powerful rivals.
