= Frank Hopkins (footballer) =

Australian rules footballer

Personal information
- Full name: Francis Stanley Hopkins
- Born: 8 February 1909; Beverley, Western Australia
- Died: 4 January 1960 (aged 50); Nedlands, Western Australia
- Original team: Boulder City
- Position: Forward

Playing career
Years	Club	Games (Goals)
1926–1933	West Perth	128 (289)
1935–1941	Claremont	70 (268)
Total		198 (557)

Representative team honours
Years	Team	Games (Goals)
1928–1930	Western Australia	11 (32)

Career highlights
- WAFL leading goalkicker: 1930; West Perth leading goalkicker: 1929, 1930; West Perth premiership team: 1932; Claremont leading goalkicker: 1936, 1937; Claremont premiership team: 1938; West Australian Football Hall of Fame: 2013

Francis Staney Hopkins (8 February 1909 – 4 January 1960) was an Australian rules footballer who played for West Perth and Claremont in the West Australian Football League (WAFL) between 1926 and 1941. He was the leading goalkicker in the league for the 1930 season, and won a premiership with each club he represented. Hopkins played eleven state games for Western Australia, and in 2013 was inducted in to the West Australian Football Hall of Fame.

== Biography ==
Hopkins was born in Beverley, Western Australia, but was raised on the Eastern Goldfields. He first came to notice as a football player in 1925, when as a 16-year-old he played a full season for Boulder City in the Goldfields Football League (GFL).

== West Perth ==
Based on his reputation on the goldfields, Hopkins earned a transfer to West Perth for the metropolitan league's 1926 season. He played every game in his debut season and finished with 21 goals as a centre half-forward, with his athleticism and brilliant marking allowing him to compete with much older and bigger players. In Hopkins' second season, he won inclusion in the WA state team for a tour of the eastern states. He kicked three goals against Victoria on his state debut, in front of 31,000 people at the MCG, and then in the next match against a CANFL team kicked five goals from a half-forward flank. Finally, playing centre-half-forward against South Australia, he kicked three more goals in a narrow 11-point loss, finishing with 11 goals from his first three games as a state player.

As a 20-year-old, Hopkins kicked 63 goals from 18 games in the 1929 season to finish as West Perth's leading goalkicker. This included eight goals against a struggling Claremont-Cottesloe team in round twelve. Hopkins had less success in three more state games in 1929, although after being dropped for a goalless performance against Victoria he rebounded with five goals in a 49-point thrashing of South Australia in the next game.

In the last round of the 1930 season, Hopkins put in probably the most outstanding performance of his career, kicking fourteen goals (twelve in the second half) in a loss against Perth. This set a new record for the most goals in a losing game in a major Australian rules football league (later equalled by Gary Ablett Sr. in 1993). This took his season total to 79 goals, which although quite low by the standards of following decades allowed him to be crowned the league's leading goalkicker. It was in fact not until John Gerovich won with 74 goals in 1956 that another leading goalkicker kicked less than 80 goals in a season. At the 1930 Australian National Football Carnival in Adelaide, Hopkins kicked 19 goals in four games, including ten goals against Queensland and six against New South Wales.

Hopkins began 1931 in his usual CHF role, but after a few rounds was switched to centre half back due to competition from Ted Flemming and Ted Tyson (both of whom also won league leading goalkicker medals). He rotated back and forth between the two positions over the next few seasons, but in the 1932 Grand Final kicked two goals from CHF to help West Perth claim its first premiership since 1905. Increasingly inhibited by injury, Hopkins played just 21 games in his last two seasons at the club, leaving at the end of the 1933 season with 289 goals from 128 games.

== Claremont ==
Hopkins did not resume his career until midway through the 1935 season, when he received a clearance to Claremont. He had a slow start with his new club, but in 1936 bounced back to form with 83 goals from 21 games. In 1937, he broke the century mark for the first time, with 120 goals from 23 games (24 less than league leading goalkicker George Doig and four less than runner-up Ted Tyson). This included 11 goals against South Fremantle in round 11 and 10 against Perth in round seven, as well as five in the grand final loss to Subiaco. He had also played in a losing grand final team the previous season, but in 1938 Claremont finally claimed its first ever premiership, with Hopkins playing as 19th man (i.e. as substitute) and only coming on to the ground in the final term. That was his last full season in senior football, but in 1941 he was recalled as 19th man for one final game, against his old club West Perth late in the year as the result of an injury crisis / dearth of players due to the war. He kicked a goal shortly after coming on to the ground.
