= 1937 WANFL season =

Australian rules football season

- Teams: 8
- Premiers: East Fremantle; 18th premiership
- Minor premiers: Claremont; 1st minor premiership
- Sandover Medallist: Frank Jenkins (South Fremantle)
- Leading goalkicker: George Doig (East Fremantle)
- Matches played: 88

The 1937 WANFL season was the 53rd season of the Western Australian National Football League. The season saw numerous notable highlights, including:

1. Five players (Note: The five were George Doig with 144, Ted Tyson with 124, Frank Hopkins with 120, Ted Holdsworth with 109 and Albert Gook with 107. Bert Chandler of South Fremantle was to score 120 goals in 1938, so that only Subiaco and East Perth of the eight WANFL clubs did not have a century goalkicker in their ranks during this period.) kicked 100 goals, a number equalled in the major leagues of VFL/AFL, VFA/VFL, or SANFL, only in the 1939 VFA season. (Note: The five were George Hawkins (Prahran) with 164, "Soapy" Vallence (Williamstown), Harold Jones (Brunswick), Lance Collins (Coburg) and Laurie Nash (Camberwell).)
2. Frank "Scranno" Jenkins won the Sandover Medal in his debut season of senior football with a record high under the 3-2-1 voting system of 34 votes.
3. In the second round, East Fremantle broke their own 21-year-old record for the highest score in league history.
4. East Perth drew three games in one season, a feat equalled in major Australian Rules Leagues only by VFA club Moorabbin in 1958 and West Perth in 1960. The Royals could easily have drawn a fourth game but for crowd acclamation preventing umpires from hearing the bell against Subiaco on Foundation Day. No senior Australian Rules team at any level is known to have tied four matches in a season, but Geelong's Under-19s did so in 1971.
5. Swan Districts, with Ted Holdsworth kicking at least six goals in each of the first ten games, reached their first finals series in only their fourth WANFL season. Holdsworth was to reach his 100 goals in two fewer games than George Doig took in his 152-goal 1934 season, but concussion and a broken hand eliminated the prospect of a new record.

Claremont, following on from their maiden finals campaign in 1936, won their first minor premiership, but were again beaten in the grand final, leading them to recruit returning West Perth coach Johnny Leonard, who immediately led them to a hat-trick of premierships. East Fremantle, after three unsuccessful finals series, recovered to win their eighteenth WANFL premiership, whilst Subiaco in falling from third after the 1936 home-and-away season to their first wooden spoon since 1916 with only three victories after the opening round, began thirty years as an almost perennial cellar-dweller.

Off the field, a minor dispute with the Perth City Council over the use of Leederville and Perth Ovals caused a delay in making the fixture list; however unlike what was to happen in 1940 when those grounds were off limits to the WANFL all season the dispute was quickly resolved by a return to the £750 rental fee.

== Home-and-away season ==
=== Round 1 ===
	Round 1
Saturday, 24 April (2:45 pm)	East Perth 14.13 (97)	drew with	Claremont 13.19 (97)	Perth Oval
Saturday, 24 April (2:45 pm)	Perth 10.12 (72)	def. by	East Fremantle 15.17 (107)	WACA
Saturday, 24 April (2:45 pm)	South Fremantle 14.15 (99)	def. by	West Perth 19.8 (122)	Fremantle Oval
Saturday, 24 April (2:45 pm)	Subiaco 16.11 (107)	def.	Swan Districts 11.17 (83)	Subiaco Oval
East Perth come back from twenty-nine points down at half-time for the first WANFL draw since Round 20, 1934 when the Royals drew with Subiaco.

=== Round 2 ===
	Round 2
Saturday, 1 May (2:45 pm)	West Perth 10.19 (79)	def.	Perth 9.11 (65)	Leederville Oval
Saturday, 1 May (2:45 pm)	East Fremantle 28.23 (191)	def.	South Fremantle 16.14 (110)	Fremantle Oval
Saturday, 1 May (2:45 pm)	Claremont 18.14 (122)	def.	Swan Districts 13.8 (86)	Claremont Oval
Saturday, 1 May (2:45 pm)	East Perth 20.15 (135)	def.	Subiaco 7.7 (49)	Perth Oval
East Fremantle kick the highest score to that point in WANFL history, beating their own record of 27.22 (184) against the defunct Midland Junction from 1916. George Doig kicks a phenomenal 13.12 (90).

=== Round 3 (Labour Day) ===
	Round 3
Monday, 3 May (2:45 pm)	Subiaco 10.13 (73)	def. by	West Perth 12.7 (79)	Subiaco Oval
Monday, 3 May (2:45 pm)	Swan Districts 13.17 (95)	def.	South Fremantle 11.15 (81)	Bassendean Oval
Monday, 3 May (2:45 pm)	Claremont 14.9 (93)	def. by	East Fremantle 16.16 (112)	Claremont Oval
Monday, 3 May (2:45 pm)	Perth 11.10 (76)	def. by	East Perth 25.27 (177)	WACA
East Perth set a WANFL record for best first quarter score with 10.11 (71). This was not beaten in open-age competition until Round 12 of 1955.

=== Round 4 ===
	Round 4
Saturday, 8 May (2:45 pm)	Swan Districts 15.12 (102)	def.	East Fremantle 14.12 (96)	Bassendean Oval
Saturday, 8 May (2:45 pm)	East Perth 8.3 (51)	drew with	West Perth 7.9 (51)	Perth Oval
Saturday, 8 May (2:45 pm)	South Fremantle 12.12 (84)	def. by	Claremont 15.10 (100)	Fremantle Oval
Saturday, 8 May (2:45 pm)	Perth 15.12 (102)	def.	Subiaco 13.12 (90)	WACA
East Perth's two draws in four matches is the second-closest pair of draws by any club in WAFL history, behind West Perth's two consecutive drawn games in 1960.

=== Round 5 (Coronation Day) ===
	Round 5
Wednesday, 12 May (2:45 pm)	Subiaco 10.6 (66)	def. by	Claremont 12.13 (85)	Subiaco Oval
Saturday, 15 May (2:45 pm)	West Perth 12.11 (83)	def.	East Fremantle 11.14 (80)	Leederville Oval
Saturday, 15 May (2:45 pm)	South Fremantle 17.17 (119)	def.	Perth 11.10 (76)	Fremantle Oval
Saturday, 15 May (2:45 pm)	Swan Districts 12.9 (81)	def.	East Perth 11.7 (73)	Bassendean Oval
The Claremont v Subiaco match was played on a public holiday for the coronation of King George VI.; West Perth stay undefeated via a goal by Bunting after he was interfered with by the man on the mark.; Holdsworth kicks ten of Swan Districts' twelve goals in heavy rain to stay ahead on the goalkicking.; South Fremantle end their longest losing streak in open-age competition until 1987, having last won in the twelfth game of 1936.

=== Round 6 ===
	Round 6
Saturday, 22 May (2:45 pm)	Perth 11.15 (81)	def. by	Swan Districts 14.14 (98)	WACA
Saturday, 22 May (2:45 pm)	East Perth 15.13 (103)	def.	South Fremantle 10.7 (67)	Perth Oval
Saturday, 22 May (2:45 pm)	West Perth 11.8 (74)	def. by	Claremont 15.14 (104)	Leederville Oval
Saturday, 22 May (2:45 pm)	East Fremantle 21.12 (138)	def.	Subiaco 12.20 (92)	Fremantle Oval
Claremont end West Perth's unbeaten run under 1934 and 1935 premiership coach Leonard with a 5.5 (35) to 0.2 (2) last quarter.; Swan Districts recover from seven goals behind early in the second quarter to defeat Perth, with Holdsworth maintaining his average of eight goals a game.

=== Round 7 ===
	Round 7
Saturday, 29 May (2:45 pm)	South Fremantle 17.14 (116)	def.	Subiaco 11.9 (75)	Fremantle Oval
Saturday, 29 May (2:45 pm)	Swan Districts 11.14 (80)	def.	West Perth 11.11 (77)	Bassendean Oval
Saturday, 29 May (2:45 pm)	East Perth 18.11 (119)	def.	East Fremantle 10.8 (68)	Perth Oval
Saturday, 29 May (2:45 pm)	Claremont 25.18 (168)	def.	Perth 8.10 (58)	Claremont Oval
Swan Districts win a fifth successive close match to move into the top four.; Frank Hopkins kicks ten goals as Claremont record easily their biggest win in their twelve-year WA(N)FL history, beating 68 points against the Demons from the previous season.

=== Round 8 ===
	Round 8
Saturday, 5 June (2:45 pm)	West Perth 12.17 (89)	def.	South Fremantle 10.15 (75)	Leederville Oval
Saturday, 5 June (2:45 pm)	Claremont 15.19 (109)	def.	East Perth 15.11 (101)	Claremont Oval
Saturday, 5 June (2:45 pm)	Swan Districts 16.16 (112)	def.	Subiaco 7.10 (52)	Bassendean Oval
Saturday, 5 June (2:45 pm)	East Fremantle 16.26 (122)	def.	Perth 18.11 (119)	Fremantle Oval

=== Round 9 (Foundation Day) ===
	Round 9
Monday, 7 June (2:45 pm)	South Fremantle 16.15 (111)	def.	East Fremantle 14.17 (101)	Fremantle Oval
Monday, 7 June (2:45 pm)	Swan Districts 14.12 (96)	def.	Claremont 12.17 (89)	Bassendean Oval
Monday, 7 June (2:45 pm)	Subiaco 16.11 (107)	def. by	East Perth 16.12 (108)	Subiaco Oval
Monday, 7 June (2:45 pm)	Perth 12.12 (84)	def. by	West Perth 14.11 (95)	WACA
Swans move to the top with their seventh consecutive victory.; East Perth gather the winning point after the noises of a pro-Subiaco crowd prevent any of the umpires from hearing the bell.

=== Round 10 ===
	Round 10
Saturday, 12 June (2:45 pm)	East Fremantle 20.20 (140)	def.	Claremont 16.14 (110)	Fremantle Oval
Saturday, 12 June (2:45 pm)	Swan Districts 14.11 (95)	def.	South Fremantle 14.9 (93)	Bassendean Oval
Saturday, 12 June (2:45 pm)	West Perth 17.13 (115)	def.	Subiaco 4.14 (38)	Leederville Oval
Saturday, 12 June (2:45 pm)	East Perth 11.11 (77)	def. by	Perth 11.16 (82)	Perth Oval
Swan Districts win their eighth game on end, a feat they were not to surpass until 1979/1980, with Holdsworth maintaining his remarkable average of 7.9 goals per game.; Regaining several key players from injury and with George Doig kicking ten, East Fremantle displace Claremont from top place and stay in contention for the top four.

=== Round 11 ===
	Round 11
Saturday, 19 June (2:45 pm)	East Fremantle 18.18 (126)	def.	Swan Districts 14.15 (99)	Fremantle Oval
Saturday, 19 June (2:45 pm)	West Perth 11.14 (80)	def. by	East Perth 15.8 (98)	Leederville Oval
Saturday, 19 June (2:45 pm)	Claremont 22.13 (145)	def.	South Fremantle 15.10 (100)	Claremont Oval
Saturday, 19 June (2:45 pm)	Subiaco 10.14 (74)	def.	Perth 9.13 (67)	Subiaco Oval
8.7 (55) in the second quarter allows Old Easts to end Swan Districts' winning streak, though East Perth's win over the Cardinals ensures Swans remain on top.

=== Round 12 ===
	Round 12
Saturday, 26 June (2:45 pm)	Claremont 8.11 (59)	def. by	Subiaco 14.7 (91)	Claremont Oval
Saturday, 26 June (2:45 pm)	East Perth 10.9 (69)	def.	Swan Districts 7.9 (51)	Perth Oval
Saturday, 26 June (2:45 pm)	Perth 17.21 (123)	def.	South Fremantle 7.8 (50)	WACA
Saturday, 26 June (2:45 pm)	East Fremantle 14.12 (96)	def.	West Perth 11.9 (75)	Fremantle Oval
With Crow holding Holdsworth to one goal one on a ground waterlogged by 159.8 millimetres (6.29 in) of rain over the past week, East Perth knocks Swans from the top.

=== Round 13 ===
	Round 13
Saturday, 3 July (2:45 pm)	Subiaco 12.13 (85)	def. by	East Fremantle 15.13 (103)	Subiaco Oval
Saturday, 3 July (2:45 pm)	South Fremantle 17.17 (119)	def.	East Perth 11.16 (82)	Fremantle Oval
Saturday, 3 July (2:45 pm)	Claremont 15.9 (99)	def.	West Perth 12.16 (88)	Claremont Oval
Saturday, 3 July (2:45 pm)	Swan Districts 13.11 (89)	def. by	Perth 14.8 (92)	Bassendean Oval
Holdsworth, on 94 goals, misses a simple shot and lowly Perth record a surprise win that sends East Fremantle to top place.

=== Round 14 ===
	Round 14
Saturday, 10 July (2:45 pm)	West Perth 12.12 (84)	def. by	Swan Districts 14.7 (91)	Leederville Oval
Saturday, 10 July (2:45 pm)	Subiaco 12.9 (81)	def.	South Fremantle 7.15 (57)	Subiaco Oval
Saturday, 10 July (2:45 pm)	East Fremantle 13.14 (92)	def. by	East Perth 14.28 (112)	Fremantle Oval
Saturday, 10 July (2:45 pm)	Perth 14.17 (101)	def. by	Claremont 14.18 (102)	WACA
Holdsworth kicks his 100th goal as Swan Districts relegate the Cardinals to six points out of the four.; Reeves snaps the winning point on the bell and Claremont gain two points to move half a game ahead of Old Easts, the Royals and the Swans.

=== Round 15 ===
	Round 15
Saturday, 17 July (2:45 pm)	South Fremantle 9.10 (64)	def. by	West Perth 14.9 (93)	Fremantle Oval
Saturday, 17 July (2:45 pm)	East Perth 12.10 (82)	def. by	Claremont 15.14 (104)	Perth Oval
Saturday, 17 July (2:45 pm)	Perth 13.14 (92)	def. by	East Fremantle 16.13 (109)	WACA
Saturday, 17 July (2:45 pm)	Swan Districts 11.13 (79)	def.	Subiaco 7.14 (56)	Bassendean Oval
Ted Holdsworth, decisively beaten by Lou Daily, suffers concussion late in the third quarter, which keeps him out of the WA State team.

=== Round 16 ===
	Round 16
Saturday, 24 July (2:45 pm)	East Fremantle 20.13 (133)	def.	South Fremantle 14.20 (104)	Fremantle Oval
Saturday, 24 July (2:45 pm)	West Perth 18.6 (114)	def.	Perth 14.11 (95)	Leederville Oval
Saturday, 24 July (2:45 pm)	Subiaco 10.8 (68)	def. by	East Perth 11.15 (81)	Subiaco Oval
Saturday, 24 July (2:45 pm)	Swan Districts 9.13 (67)	def. by	Claremont 14.15 (99)	Bassendean Oval
Claremont run away from Swans – minus Holdsworth – in the last quarter to stay on top, whilst with Tyson kicking 10.0 West Perth remain with a chance of displacing the black and whites.

=== Round 17 ===
	Round 17
Saturday, 31 July (2:45 pm)	West Perth 22.18 (150)	def.	Subiaco 6.12 (48)	Leederville Oval
Saturday, 31 July (2:45 pm)	Perth 13.18 (96)	def. by	East Perth 19.11 (125)	WACA
Saturday, 31 July (2:45 pm)	Claremont 12.16 (88)	def. by	East Fremantle 15.16 (106)	Claremont Oval
Saturday, 31 July (2:45 pm)	South Fremantle 11.12 (78)	def. by	Swan Districts 11.15 (81)	Fremantle Oval
Following this round, WANFL football was suspended for two weeks to accommodate the 1937 Perth Carnival.; Ted Tyson's twelve goals means that for the first time three players pass 100 for the season.

=== Round 18 ===
	Round 18
Saturday, 21 August (2:45 pm)	West Perth 11.11 (77)	def.	East Perth 10.14 (74)	Leederville Oval
Saturday, 21 August (2:45 pm)	Subiaco 12.10 (82)	def. by	Perth 14.16 (100)	Subiaco Oval
Saturday, 21 August (2:45 pm)	East Fremantle 12.15 (87)	def. by	Swan Districts 16.18 (114)	Fremantle Oval
Saturday, 21 August (2:45 pm)	Claremont 17.17 (119)	def.	South Fremantle 8.14 (62)	Claremont Oval
Swans record an unexpected win over East Fremantle in what would prove Holdsworth's last match for the season.; Despite failing to score in the last quarter, West Perth displace East Perth from the four.

=== Round 19 ===
	Round 19
Saturday, 28 August (2:45 pm)	East Fremantle 14.9 (93)	def.	West Perth 12.11 (83)	Fremantle Oval
Saturday, 28 August (2:45 pm)	East Perth 17.19 (121)	def.	Swan Districts 12.5 (77)	Perth Oval
Saturday, 28 August (2:45 pm)	Claremont 16.15 (111)	def.	Subiaco 11.16 (82)	Claremont Oval
Saturday, 28 August (2:45 pm)	Perth 23.18 (156)	def.	South Fremantle 6.13 (49)	WACA
East Perth produce a critical win to regain a place in the four.; Perth's crushing win ensures the South Fremantle v Subiaco match will determine the wooden-spooner. It was Perth's biggest win over any opponent for twenty-one years and their biggest to that point over South Fremantle.

=== Round 20 ===
	Round 20
Saturday, 4 September (2:45 pm)	South Fremantle 14.15 (99)	def. by	East Perth 19.11 (125)	Fremantle Oval
Saturday, 4 September (2:45 pm)	Claremont 18.9 (117)	def.	West Perth 14.15 (99)	Claremont Oval
Saturday, 4 September (2:45 pm)	Subiaco 12.10 (82)	def. by	East Fremantle 12.25 (97)	Subiaco Oval
Saturday, 4 September (2:45 pm)	Swan Districts 14.8 (92)	def.	Perth 11.14 (80)	Bassendean Oval
West Perth's loss, and East Perth's win in a vicious match with eight players injured, seals the four with a round to play.

=== Round 21 ===
	Round 21
Saturday, 11 September (2:45 pm)	Perth 13.17 (95)	def. by	Claremont 15.15 (105)	WACA
Saturday, 11 September (2:45 pm)	Swan Districts 22.7 (139)	def.	West Perth 12.15 (87)	Bassendean Oval
Saturday, 11 September (2:45 pm)	East Perth 17.7 (109)	drew with	East Fremantle 15.19 (109)	Perth Oval
Saturday, 11 September (2:45 pm)	South Fremantle 14.10 (94)	def.	Subiaco 11.21 (87)	Fremantle Oval
East Fremantle's comeback to force a draw ensures they retain the double chance: East Perth's better percentage would have put them second had the Royals won.; Subiaco's 1.13 (19) to 7.4 (46) in the second and third quarters consigns it to a first wooden spoon in twenty-one seasons.

== Ladder ==
1937 WANFL ladder
Pos	Team	Pld	W	L	D	PF	PA	PP	Pts
1	Claremont	21	15	5	1	2225	1887	117.9	62
2	East Fremantle (P)	21	14	6	1	2306	2054	112.3	58
3	Swan Districts	21	14	7	0	1907	1850	103.1	56
4	East Perth	21	12	6	3	2119	1759	120.5	54
5	West Perth	21	11	9	1	1894	1763	107.4	46
6	Perth	21	6	15	0	1912	2123	90.1	24
7	South Fremantle	21	5	16	0	1831	2272	80.6	20
8	Subiaco	21	4	17	0	1585	2071	76.5	16

Rules for classification: 1) points; 2) percentage; 3) number of points for.
(P) Premiers

== Finals ==
=== First semi-final ===
	First semi-final
Saturday, 18 September (2:45 pm)	Swan Districts 11.7 (73)	def. by	East Perth 13.9 (87)	Subiaco Oval (crowd: 11,000)
East Perth win a disappointing game in wet and windy conditions to eliminate Swan Districts in their first WANFL final.

=== Second semi-final ===
	Second semi-final
Saturday, 25 September (2:45 pm)	Claremont 13.10 (88)	def.	East Fremantle 10.14 (74)	Subiaco Oval (crowd: 12,000)
An excellent last quarter into the breeze ensures Claremont reaches its second successive grand final.

=== Preliminary final ===
	Preliminary final
Saturday, 2 October (2:45 pm)	East Fremantle 11.12 (78)	def.	East Perth 6.19 (55)	Subiaco Oval (crowd: 12,000)
East Fremantle's impressive defence and clever centreline, with McGlinn dominant, ensures a rematch with Claremont.

== Grand final ==
1937 WANFL Grand Final
Saturday, 9 October (2:45 pm)	Claremont	def. by	East Fremantle	Subiaco Oval (crowd: 16,460)
3.1 (19); 7.2 (44); 12.8 (80); 13.9 (87)	Q1; Q2; Q3; Final	4.0 (24); 8.5 (53); 10.9 (69); 14.13 (97)	Umpires: George Owens
Hopkins 5, Boys 3, Compton 2, Hooper, Lawn	Goals	George Doig 5, Truscott 3, Martiensen 3, McGlinn 2, Wendt
Reeves (best on ground), Hopkins, Batt, Clarke (until injured), Syd Moloney, Boys	Best	Seubert, McGlinn, Clark, Kingsbury, Hutchinson, Fordham, Briggs
Clarke (knee)	Injuries
In one of the best grand finals seen for some years, East Fremantle gain the upper hand in the last quarter and eventually overcome a dogged Claremont defence.
