= List of Australian rules football statues =

This is a list of Australian rules football-related statues.^{a}

== Statues ==
Image	Title / individual(s) commemorated	Unveiled	Sculptor	Location	Source
—N/a	Darrel Baldock	2014, April	Unknown	Darrel Baldock Oval, Latrobe, Tas	
	Ron Barassi	2003, September	Louis Laumen	Melbourne Cricket Ground, Melbourne, Vic	
	Kevin Bartlett	2017, March	Liz Johnson	Melbourne Cricket Ground, Melbourne, Vic	
	Malcolm Blight	2015, August	Will Kuiper	Adelaide Oval, Adelaide, SA	
—N/a	Haydn Bunton, Sr.	2005, April	Louis Laumen	Melbourne Cricket Ground, Melbourne, Vic	
	John Coleman	2013, September	Lis Johnson	Melbourne Cricket Ground, Melbourne, Vic	
	John Coleman and Tom Meehan	2005	Steve Glassborow	Hastings, Vic	
	Jack Dyer	2003, September	Mitch Mitchell	Punt Road Oval, Melbourne, Vic	
	Russell Ebert	2015, August	Adelaide Oval, Adelaide, SA		
	Ken Farmer	2017, September	Unknown	Adelaide Oval, Adelaide, SA	
	John Gerovich and Ray French	2006, June	Robert Hitchcock	Fremantle Oval, Fremantle, WA	
—N/a	Adam Goodes	2023, May	Cathy Weiszmann	Sydney Cricket Ground, Sydney, NSW	
	Doug Hawkins	1997, September	Unknown	Braybrook Hotel, Melbourne, Vic	
—N/a	Alex Jesaulenko	2008	Lis Johnson	National Sports Museum, Melbourne, Vic	
	Paul Kelly	2010, August	Cathy Weiszmann	Sydney Cricket Ground, Sydney, NSW	
	John Kennedy, Sr.	2008, April	Unknown	Waverley Park, Melbourne, Vic	
—N/a	Michael Long	2018, July	Unknown	EFC's "The Hangar", Melbourne, VIC	
	Leigh Matthews	2005, August	Louis Laumen	Melbourne Cricket Ground, Melbourne, Vic	
	Dick Reynolds	2004, June	Louis Laumen	Melbourne Cricket Ground, Melbourne, Vic	
—N/a	Lou Richards	2014, April	Unknown	Melbourne Olympic Park, Melbourne, Vic	
	Neil Roberts	Unknown	Linda Klarfeld	Melbourne High School, Melbourne, Vic	
	Barrie Robran	2014, March	Ken Martin	Adelaide Oval, Adelaide, SA	
—N/a	Paul Roos	2009, August	Cathy Weiszmann	Sydney Cricket Ground, Sydney, NSW	
—N/a	Bob Rose	2006, August	Mitch Mitchell	Melbourne Olympic Park, Melbourne, VIC	
—N/a	Bob Skilton	2018, July	Cathy Weiszmann	Lakeside Stadium, Melbourne, Vic	
—N/a	Norm Smith	2012, September	Lis Johnson	Melbourne Cricket Ground, Melbourne, Vic	
	Jim Stynes	2014, September	Lis Johnson	Melbourne Cricket Ground, Melbourne, Vic	
	Ted Whitten	1994	Mitch Mitchell	Whitten Oval, Melbourne, Vic	
	Ted Whitten	1997, September	Unknown	Braybrook Hotel, Melbourne, Vic	
	Nicky Winmar	2019, July	Louis Laumen	Perth Stadium, Perth, WA	
	Tom Wills	2001	Louis Laumen	Melbourne Cricket Ground, Melbourne, Vic	

== See also ==
- List of individual match awards in the Australian Football League

== Notes ==
- ^ Note a: It does not include any busts, friezes, figurines, medallions, cameos or deathmasks.
