= Lou Daily =

Australian rules footballer (1911–1974)

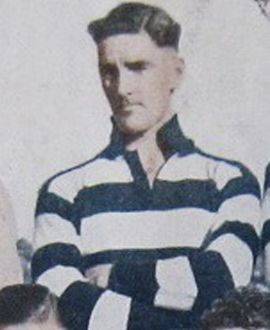
- Daily in 1934

Personal information
- Full name: Louis Joseph Daily
- Born: 31 January 1911; Mount Lawley, Western Australia
- Died: 29 August 1974 (aged 63); Heidelberg, Victoria
- Height: 185 cm (6 ft 1 in)
- Weight: 72 kg (159 lb)
- Position: Fullback

Playing career^{1}
| Years | Club | Games (Goals) |
| 1931–32, 1935–37 | Subiaco | 92 (18) |
| 1933 | Collingwood | 7 (7) |
| 1934 | Geelong | 19 (28) |
| 1938–40 | Mines Rovers | |
- ^{1} Playing statistics correct to the end of 1937.

Louis Joseph Daily (31 January 1911 – 29 August 1974) was an Australian rules footballer who played for Collingwood and Geelong in the Victorian Football League (VFL) as well as Subiaco in the West Australian National Football League (WANFL).

Collingwood recruited Daily from Subiaco, who he had played with from 1931 and he made his VFL debut in the 1933 season. He spent just one season with Collingwood before crossing to Geelong for the following season. In his first game for Geelong, in round one against St Kilda, Daily kicked ten goals. He however played most of his football throughout his career in defence, often at fullback.

In 1935 he returned to Subiaco and he won both a Sandover Medal and Subiaco best and fairest award that year. He was also a best and fairest again in 1936 and 1937. When he left the WANFL in 1938 he had played 92 games and appeared seven times for Western Australia at interstate level. He finished his career as captain-coach of the Mines Rovers in the Goldfields.
