= George Moloney (footballer, born 1909) =

Australian rules footballer & coach (1909–1983)

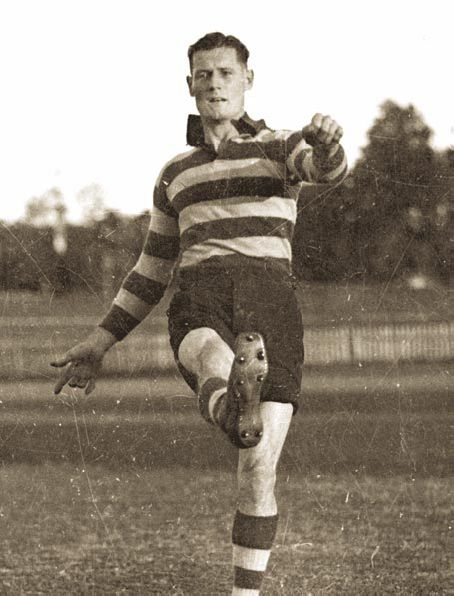

Personal information
- Full name: George Michael Moloney
- Born: 7 August 1909; East Fremantle, Western Australia
- Died: 3 January 1983 (aged 73); Nedlands, Western Australia
- Height: 174 cm (5 ft 9 in)
- Weight: 73 kg (161 lb)
- Position: Forward

Playing career^{1}
Years	Club	Games (Goals)
1927–30, 1936–45	Claremont	190 (555)
1931–1935	Geelong	88 (303)
Total		278 (858)

Representative team honours
Years	Team	Games (Goals)
1929–1938	Western Australia	11

Coaching career
Years	Club	Games (W–L–D)
1943–45, 1948–51	Claremont	135 (45–89–1)
1958–1959	Western Australia	
- ^{1} Playing statistics correct to the end of 1951.

Career highlights
- VFL Premiership player: (1931); Claremont premiership captain 1938, 1939, 1940; Sandover Medal: (1936); VFL Leading goalkicker: (1932); WANFL Leading goalkicker: (1940)

George Michael Moloney (7 August 1909 – 3 January 1983) was an Australian rules footballer who played for the Claremont Football Club in the West Australian National Football League (WANFL) and for the Geelong Football Club in the Victorian Football League (VFL). An inaugural member of the Australian Football Hall of Fame and a Legend of the West Australian Football Hall of Fame, "Specka" Moloney played as a centre, goalsneak and key forward. He was among the few players to kick 100 or more goals in a season in both the WANFL and the VFL/AFL competitions.

After four years at Claremont in the 1920s, Moloney drew strong attention as a goalsneak for Western Australia at the 1930 Adelaide Carnival. The following year, he moved to Victoria and joined the Geelong Football Club, where he played for five years, generally at full forward; he won a premiership with the club in 1931, and kicked 109 goals in 1932.

In 1936, Moloney returned to Claremont in the WANFL, he won the Sandover Medal in 1936 as the league's fairest and best player playing primarily as a centre. In 1938, he led Claremont to its first-ever premiership, and repeated the feat in the next two seasons.

All told, he played a total of 190 WA(N)FL games, some of them alongside brothers Robert (103 games 1930–36) and Syd (145 games 1934–41).

George "Specka" Moloney rounded off his association with the Tigers by coaching them, without much success, from 1948 to 1951.

In 1996, Moloney was inducted into the Australian Football Hall of Fame and in 2004 he was inducted into the West Australian Football Hall of Fame where he has legend status.

== Bibliography ==
- Ross, John (1999). The Australian Football Hall of Fame. Australia: HarperCollinsPublishers. p. 100. ISBN 0-7322-6426-X.
