= Bert Gook =

Australian rules footballer

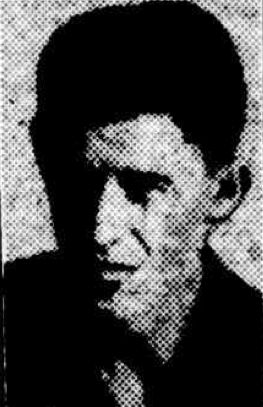

Personal information
- Full name: Albert Henry Gook
- Born: c. 1914
- Died: 15 December 1964 (aged 50); Dianella, Western Australia
- Original team: South Perth
- Height: 5 ft 10 in (178 cm)
- Weight: 11 st 0 lb (70 kg)
- Positions: Centre, full-forward

Playing career^{1}
Years	Club	Games (Goals)
1933–1940	Perth	148 (512)

Representative team honours
Years	Team	Games (Goals)
1934–1938	Western Australia	7 (20)
- ^{1} Playing statistics correct to the end of 1940.

Career highlights
- Perth leading goalkicker 1934, 1935, 1936, 1937, 1938, 1939; WANFL leading goalkicker 1939; Perth best and fairest 1940; Perth Team of the Century

Albert Henry Gook (c. 1914 – 15 December 1964) was an Australian rules footballer who played for the Perth Football Club (Note: The Perth Football Club was known as the "Victoria Park Football Club" in the 1934 and 1935 seasons.) in the Western Australian National Football League (WANFL). He was the league's leading goalkicker in 1939.

Gook began his career with South Perth in the Band of Hope Association, His senior debut for Perth came in 1933. Playing either as a centreman or at full-forward, he became known as a goal-kicking specialist, leading the club's goalkicking from the 1934 season through to the 1939 season. Gook led the WANFL's goalkicking in 1939, kicking 102 goals from 18 games. This included hauls of 10 goals against Swan Districts and 16 goals against West Perth. His tally against West Perth is a club record, as is his tally of 107 goals in 1937, (Note: Ron Tucker kicked 115 goals in the 1950 season, but that tally includes eleven goals in three finals games, so that his home-and-away tally was only 104 goals – three fewer than Gook in 1937) although he was not the WANFL's leading goalkicker that season.

Gook also represented the WANFL in seven interstate and carnival matches between 1934 and 1938, kicking 20 goals, including six against the VFL in 1938. In his final season, 1940, he took out Perth's best and fairest award, playing mainly as a centreman.

In 1941, Gook suffered a fractured skull and leg in a motorcycle accident while riding pillion on Scarborough Road, with the motorcyclist, Alexander Brown Burton Stevens, being killed. A benefit match was held in October 1941 for Gook and another footballer, J. Hulme of Swan Districts, who had also been injured in a road accident. Gook died in Dianella in December 1964, aged 50. In 1999, Gook was named at full-forward in Perth's Team of the Century.
