= Ted Tyson =

Australian rules footballer

Personal information
- Full name: Edward Arthur Tyson
- Born: 4 February 1910; Kalgoorlie, Western Australia
- Died: 5 February 1996 (aged 86); Hamersley, Western Australia
- Original team: Cunderdin
- Position: Full Forward

Playing career^{1}
| Years | Club | Games (Goals) |
| 1930–1941, 1945 | West Perth | 228 (1197) |

Representative team honours
| Years | Team | Games (Goals) |
| 1933 | Western Australia | 4 (13) |
- ^{1} Playing statistics correct to the end of 1945.

Career highlights
- 4× WANFL Premiership player: (1932, 1934, 1935, 1941); West Australian Football Hall of Fame, inducted 2004

Edward Arthur Tyson (4 February 1910 – 5 February 1996) was an Australian rules footballer who played for the West Perth Football Club in the Western Australian National Football League (WANFL).

An inaugural member of the West Australian Football Hall of Fame, Tyson held the League record for career goals before being overtaken by Austin Robertson, Jr. His career achievements were somewhat overshadowed by the fact that he was a contemporary and often compared to East Fremantle legend George Doig. If Doig was known as the "Bradman of WA Football", Tyson was the equivalent of Wally Hammond.

Tyson came from a leading Western Australian footballing family; his uncle Charlie Tyson played for Collingwood and North Melbourne Football Clubs in the Victorian Football League (VFL), while his grandfather, father and four other uncles also played football to a high standard. He debuted for the Cardinals in 1930 and kicked over fifty goals despite the club winning only six and drawing one of its eighteen games. The following year, Tyson established a permanent position at full forward and kicked eighty-one goals, which at the time was the fifth-highest total in league history. 1932 saw Tyson move further with ninety-six goals, equalling Sol Lawn's record from three seasons beforehand. To cap it off, Tyson had eight goals in the Grand Final, a record for a WANFL Grand Final not beaten until Eric Gorman in 1963.

The following season, Tyson made four appearances for Western Australia in interstate football, all at the 1933 Sydney Carnival, where he kicked thirteen goals. However, the emergence of East Fremantle’s George Doig put paid to Tyson's ambitions for regular interstate representation. Doig's 152 goals in 1934 saw him take over the full-forward position for the state team until the pair were forced into virtual retirement by World War II. Between 1933 and 1937, although Tyson kicked over 100 goals four times, Doig beat him for the league's leading goal-kicker award and the full forward position in the State's team. Nonetheless, Tyson played in two further Cardinal premiership teams in 1934 and 1935, and in 1938 managed to head the WANFL goalkicking with 126 goals, a figure made more remarkable because the once-powerful Cardinals had fallen to finish last on the ladder with only three wins. In the last match of that season Tyson kicked 17.5 of a team total of 18.7 against Swan Districts, which is the most goals for a losing side in elite Australian Rules football.

The 1939 season was even worse for the Cardinals, who had lost twenty-seven successive matches before their only win late in the season, in which Tyson kicked his thousandth career goal during the final quarter. Tyson was presented with the ball with which he kicked this thousandth goal, and a subscription fund was opened for him following this accomplishment, which ultimately reached about A£80 (about $5,000 in today's terms). Ironically, the following match saw Tyson goalless for one of only three times during his 228-game career, but when 1939 closed he was second in the goalkicking behind Perth’s Bert Gook.

With the Cardinals improving phenomenally during 1940, Tyson kicked sixty goals before appendicitis ended his season. He planned to retire after an operation before being coaxed into playing again. In 1941 he again kicked a century of goals and capped it off with six in a Grand Final win over East Fremantle, becoming one of five players to play in four Cardinal premiership teams. After the under-age competition of 1942 to 1944 ended, he made another brief comeback during 1945.

Tyson married a grand-daughter of Wally Watts, a former Midland Junction player, and was also a brother-in-law of Laurie Bandy, who played cricket for Western Australia. He died in February 1996, aged 86, in Hamersley, a northern suburb of Perth. In 2004, Tyson was one of the inaugural inductees in the West Australian Football Hall of Fame. He was also named the full-forward in West Perth’s official “Team of the Century”.

== Bibliography ==
- Atkinson, Graeme (1982). Everything you ever wanted to know about Australian rules football but couldn't be bothered asking. Melbourne, Victoria: The Five Mile Press. ISBN 0-86788-009-0.
