= Fremantle Oval =

Football oval in Fremantle

Fremantle Oval Fremantle Community Bank Oval
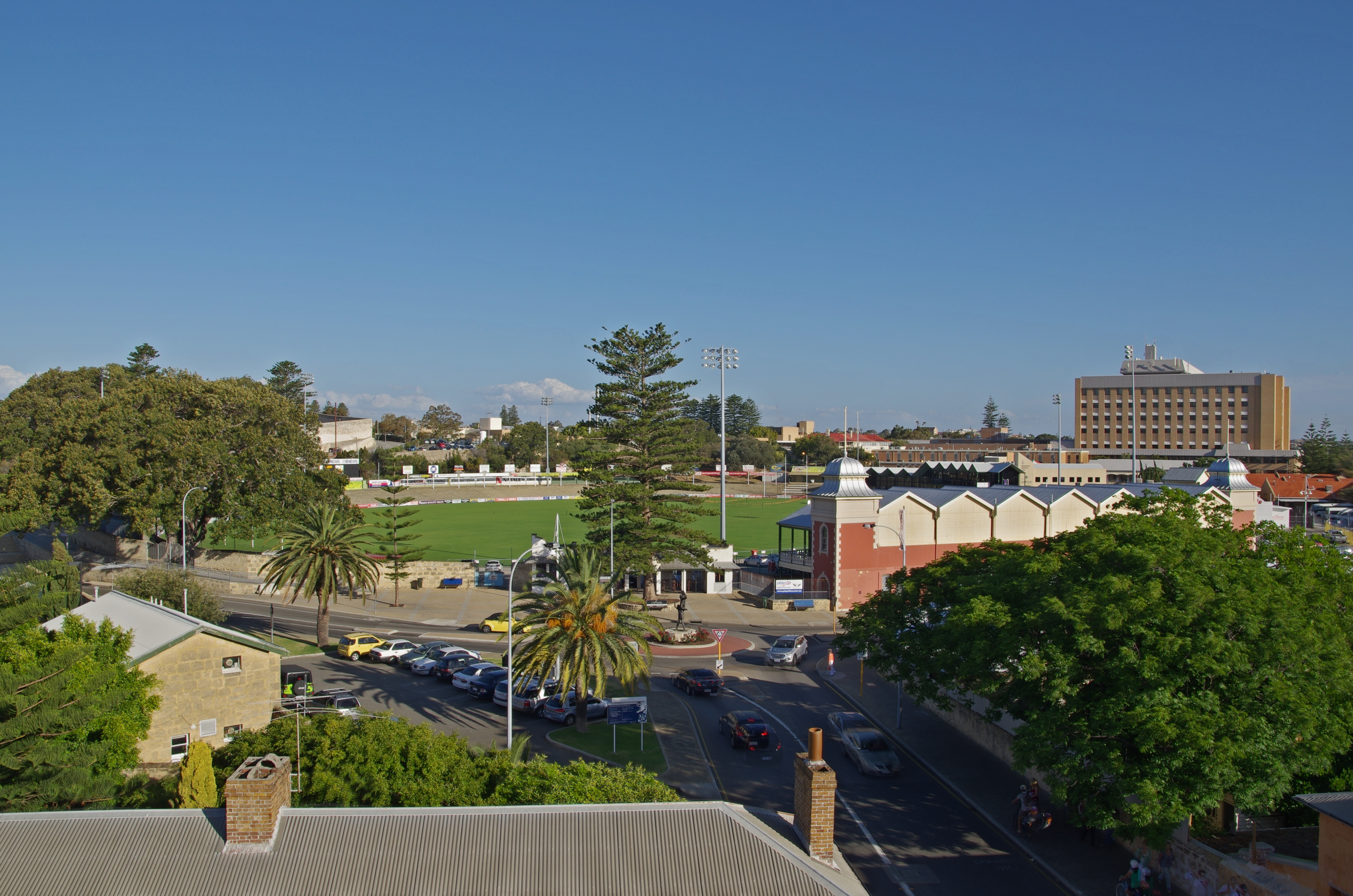
- Interactive map of Fremantle Oval; Fremantle Community Bank Oval
- Location: Fremantle, Western Australia
- Coordinates: 32°3′22″S 115°45′5″E
- Capacity: 10,000
- Surface: Grass
- Record attendance: 23,109

Construction
- Opened: 1895
- Cost: £3579

Tenants
- South Fremantle (WAFL) 1900–present Fremantle (AFLW) 2017–present Perth Glory FC (A-League) (Administration & Training) 2021–2025; East Fremantle (WAFL) 1898–1905, 1907–1952; Fremantle (WAFL) 1895–1899; Imperials (WAFL) 1895–1897 Fremantle Football Club (Administration & Training) 1995–2017

Western Australia Heritage Register
- Type: State Registered Place
- Part of: Victoria Pavilion (874)
- Reference no.: 15464

Fremantle Oval, also known by naming rights sponsorship as Fremantle Community Bank Oval, is a stadium in the centre of Fremantle, Western Australia, located on Parry Street. It currently has a capacity of 17,500 with terracing and a members area holding 750, though capacity was capped at 10,000 for Fremantle AFLW games. Fremantle Oval was originally used for cricket, but in 1895 hosted its first game of Australian rules football and Australian Football quickly became the main attraction leading to the development of the ground. It is located between the Fremantle Hospital, Fremantle Markets and the Fremantle Prison.

South Fremantle Football Club train and play their home WAFL matches at the ground and are one of the few sporting organisations in Western Australia to own their club rooms freehold, rather than on a long-term lease. Additionally, the oval is the primary home ground of the Fremantle Dockers women's team. The ground was also the training and administrative home of the Fremantle Football Club until February 2017. The ground has also hosted pre-season matches featuring Fremantle. From 2021 to 2025, the ground was A-League team Perth Glory's headquarters and training base.

== History ==
Originally known as Barracks Green Field, the area was used by the Pensioner Guards who were used primarily as guards for Fremantle Prison which house convict and ticket of leave prisoners. In 1861, Manning raised a volunteer defence force, who used the ground for manoeuvers, parades with volunteer bands providing entertainment.

As Australian Rules Football developed in the late 19th century the ground became the base for the Fremantle Football Club and hosted many early WAFL as well as interstate games. Facilities remained relatively basic until 1897 when the Victoria Pavilion was built. The large stately structure provided seating for 500 people as well as club rooms located in the basement.

By 1901 South Fremantle Football Club and East Fremantle Football Club were established as regular cotenants of Fremantle Oval. The oval also hosted Fremantle Cricket Club and a cycling track that was in regular use throughout the year.

In March 1907 Western Australia hosted New South Wales in the oval's only recorded first-class cricket match. New South Wales had three players (Warren Bardsley, Charles Macartney, and Roy Minnett) who had represented Australia in Test cricket whilst Western Australia had one (Ernie Jones). Western Australia won by 5 runs.

East Fremantle Football Club vacated the ground in 1950, moving to new premises, located at Moss Street in East Fremantle.

In 1954 the oval was used for a ceremonial parade as part of Queen Elizabeth II's first visit to Fremantle.

The Cycling Track and Cricket Pitch were removed in the 1960s due to the increasing demands of WAFL football.

The ground remained relatively unchanged until 1968 when the South Fremantle Football Club acquired a portion of land freehold at the hospital end of the ground for the construction of social club, members pavilion and players changerooms.

Further improvements were made to the ground with the growing demands of larger WAFL crowds in the 1960s and 1970s. These included a shelter behind the goals at the prison end of the ground and a large one at the hospital end of the ground named the Doig Pavilion. A three level press box was constructed adjacent to the Victoria Pavilion. The eastern outer area of the ground was also fully terraced with concrete kerbing so as to allow for greater crowd capacity.

The late 1970s witnessed a peak in crowd attendance at Fremantle Oval with over 23,000 people attending the Foundation Day Derby in 1979. Large crowds continued to flock to the ground into the early 1980s with the WAFL proving to be the most popular spectator sport in the state.

From 1980 to 1985 the oval hosted motocross racing during the summer. Noise complaints from nearby Fremantle Hospital and the availability of more suitable venues lead to the racing moving.

In 1986 the ground underwent its most dramatic structural change with the works related to the Parry Street extension, demolishing the historic Henderson Street and South Terrace entrance gates as well reducing the capacity of the ground on the western side. New entrance gates were built on Parry Street, however the South Terrace gates were never replaced.

In 1987, the entry of the West Coast Eagles into the expanded VFL competition lead to a dramatic decline in WAFL attendances. In 1995 this was compounded by the entry of the Fremantle Dockers into the AFL. Attendances dropped from an average of 8000 in the early 1980s to 3000 in the early 90s and 2000 in 1999.

=== Fremantle Football Club ===
The Fremantle Football Club established their original training and administration base at the oval in 1995, when they were formed as a new club in the AFL league that joined the league for their inaugural year in the 1995 season and in 1999, the club constructed a new training facility. This required the demolition of the Doig Pavilion and the levelling of the historic hospital end hill area that had once been one of the most popular positions for the general public to watch football matches from. In February 2017, the Fremantle Football Club moved their primary training and administration base to Cockburn ARC.

In 2017, the Dockers AFLW team began playing most home games at the oval. The oval still continues to host WAFL matches as well as AFL pre-season games.

It is also used a venue for conferences, rock concerts (including the Big Day Out) and exhibitions.

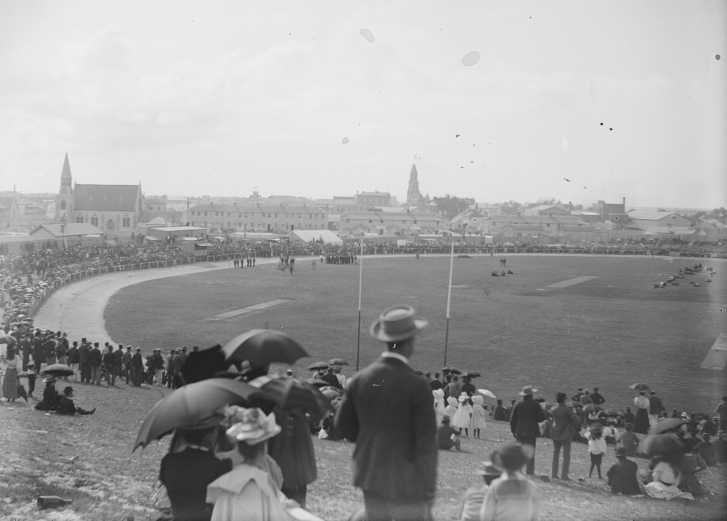
Fremantle Oval, c. 1895

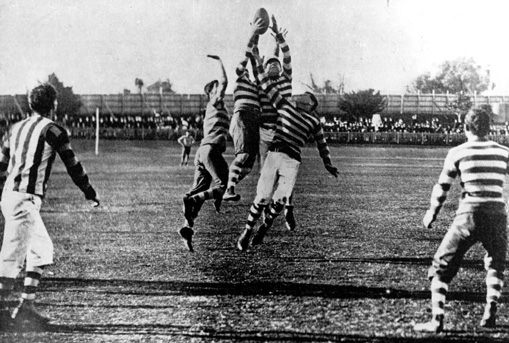
Football match Fremantle Oval in 1910

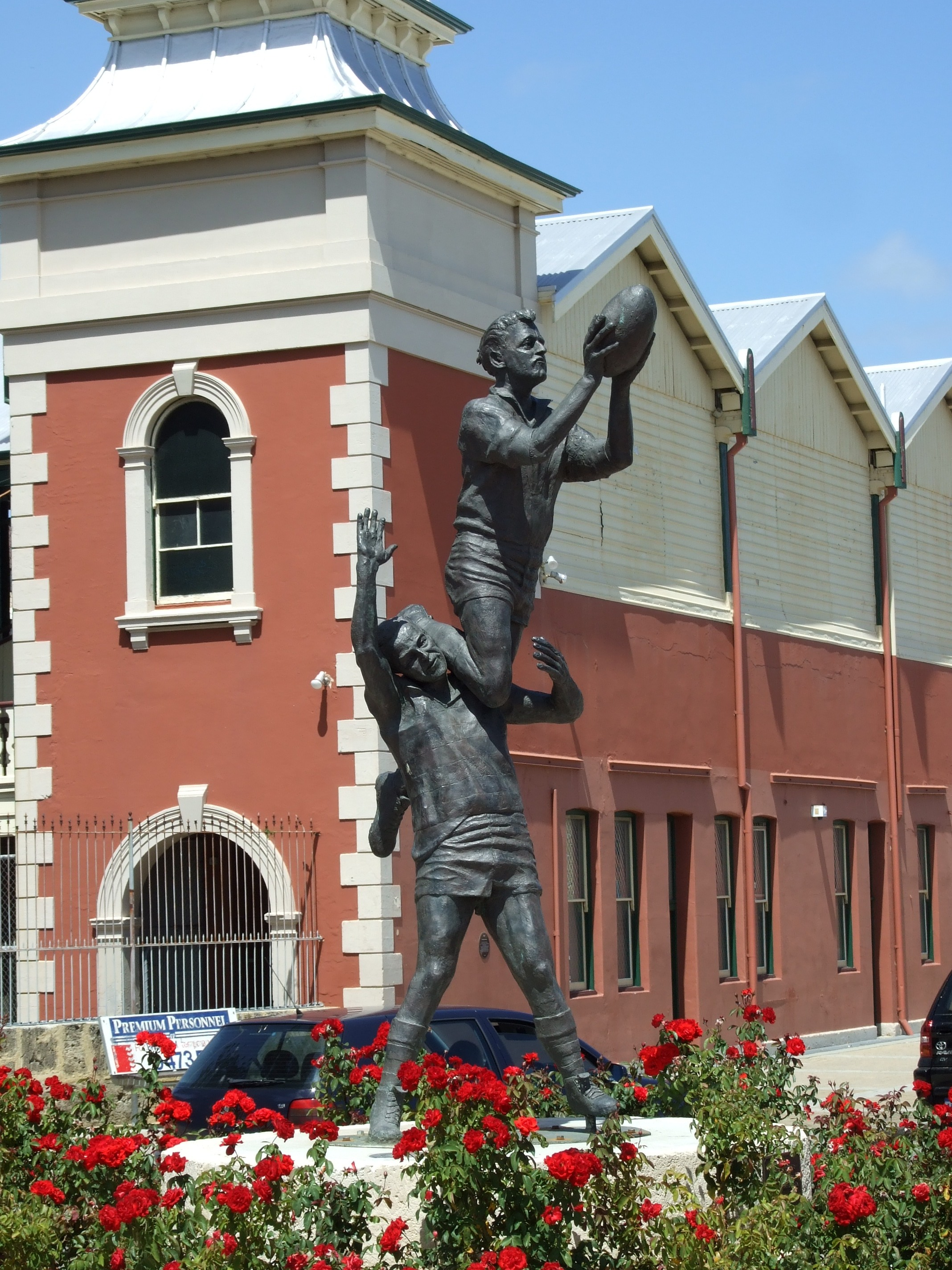
Statue of John Gerovich's spectacular mark in the 1956 WAFL preliminary final, 1890s Victoria Pavilion in the background

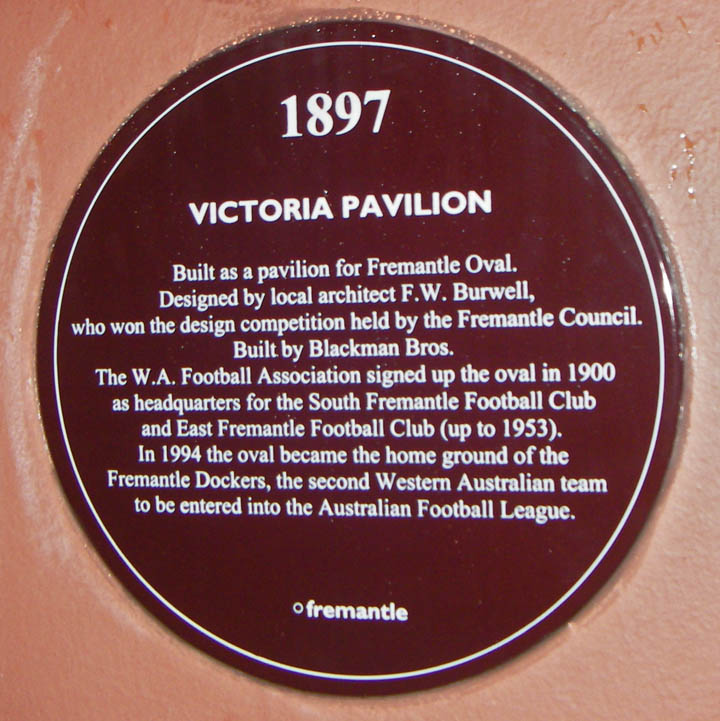
Victoria Pavilion

== Record crowd ==
23,109, when South Fremantle beat East Fremantle on 4 June 1979.

== Gallery ==
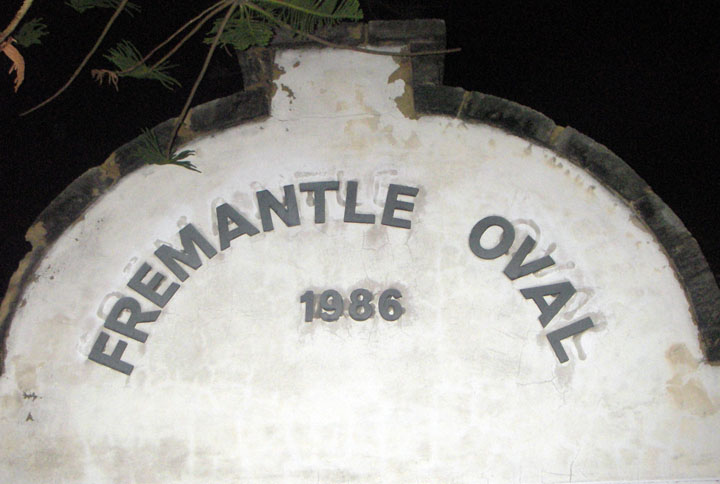
Fremantle Oval

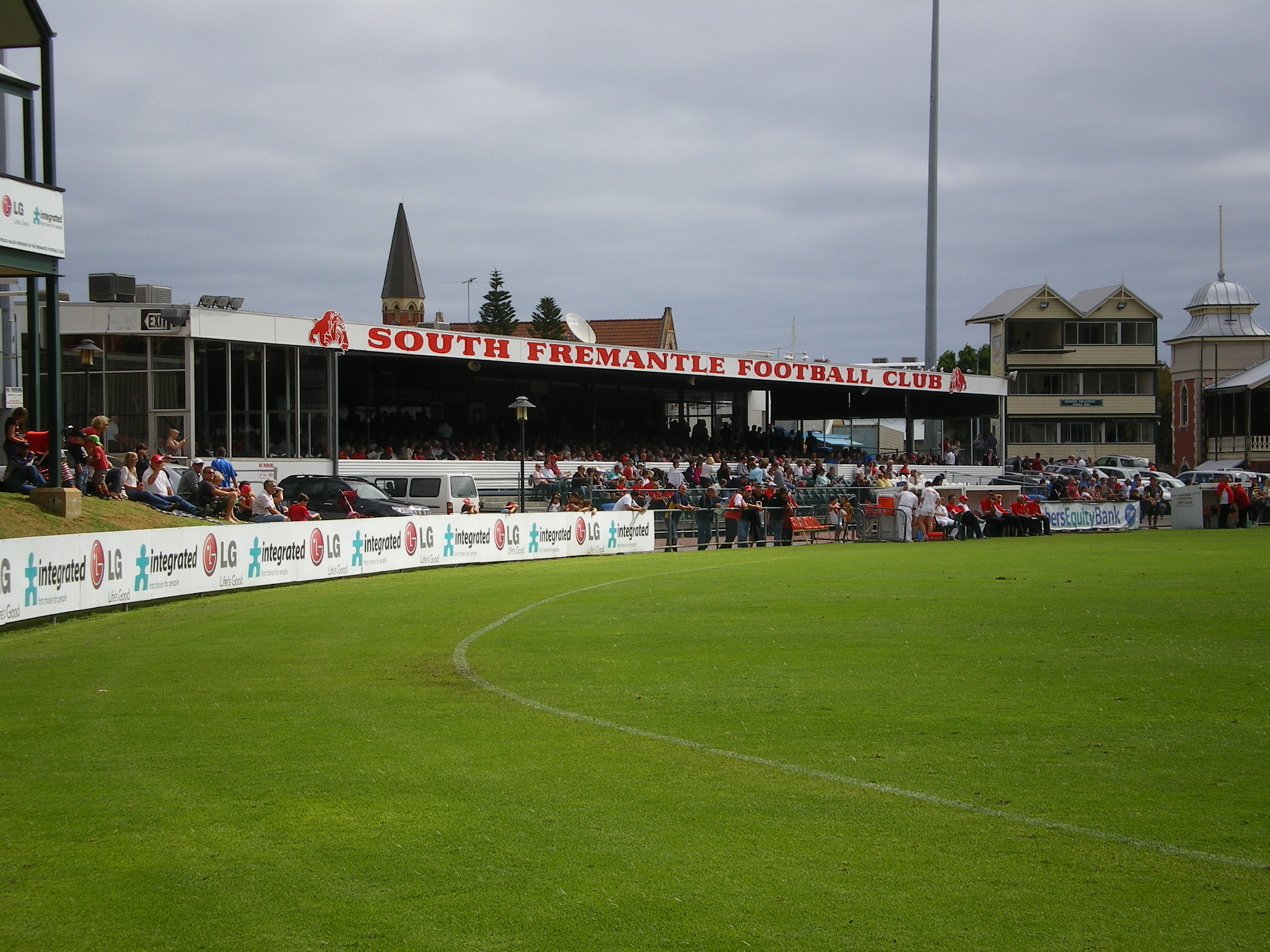
South Fremantle FC Members Stand

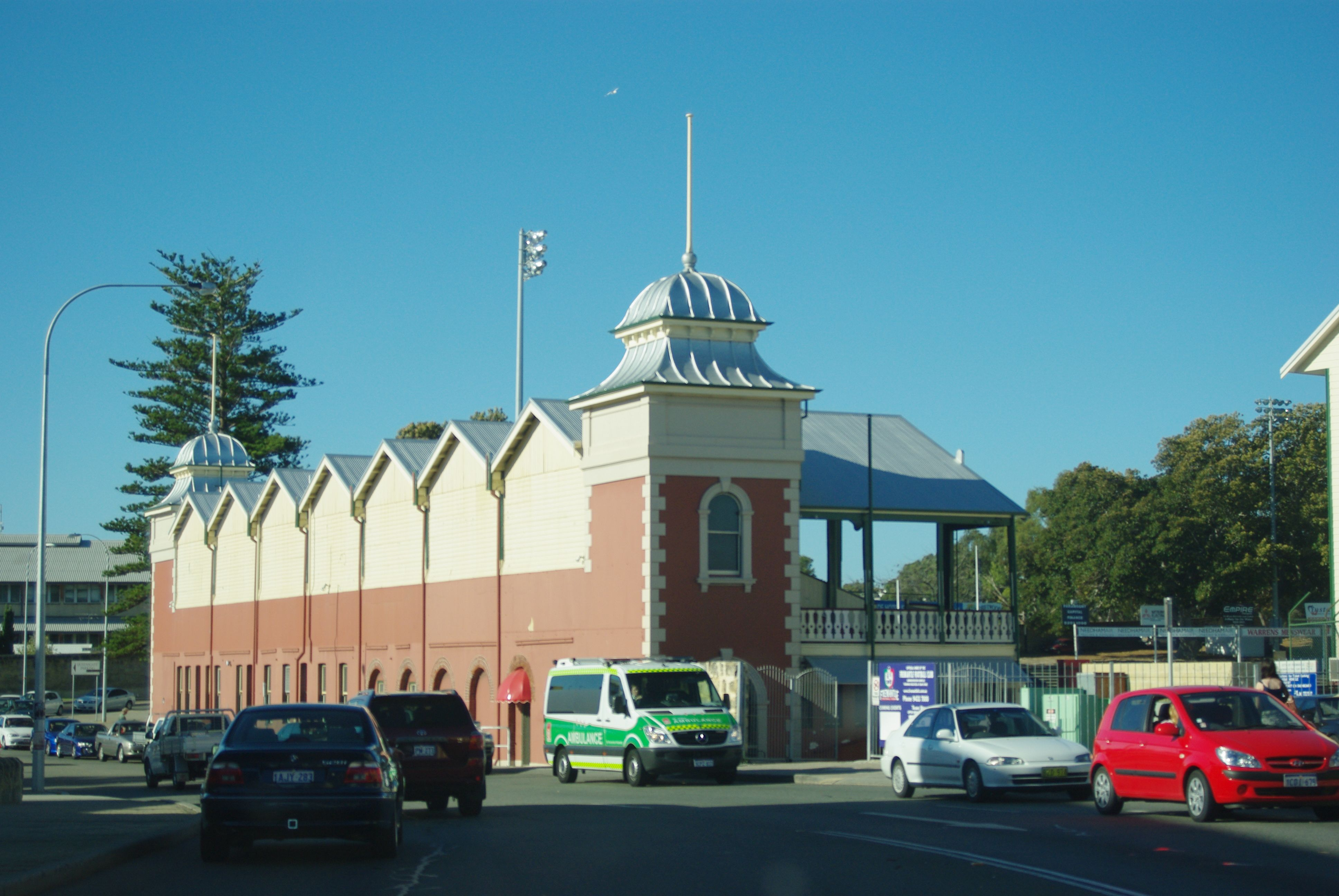
Victoria Pavilion from outside oval

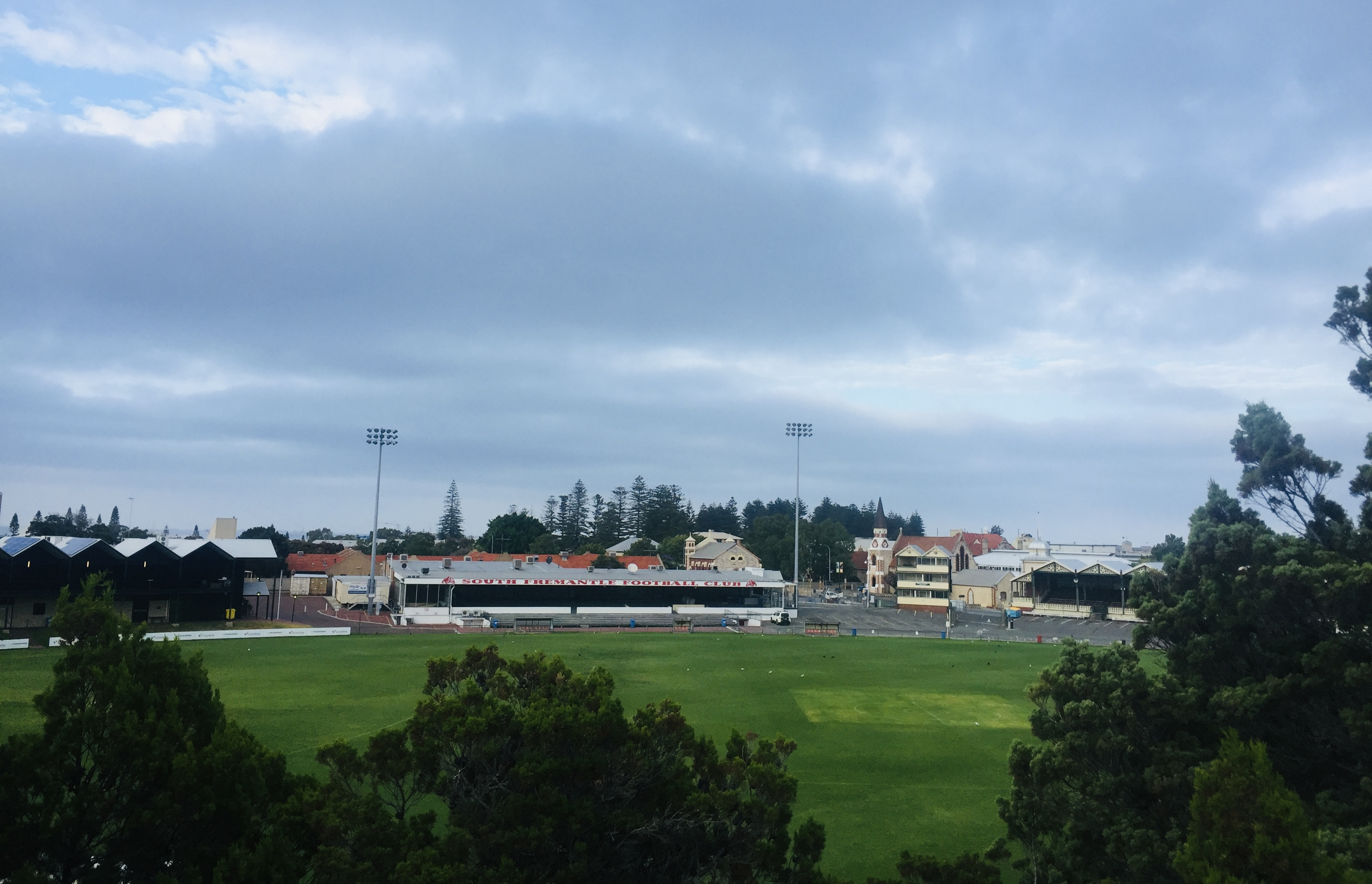
Fremantle Oval in 2016

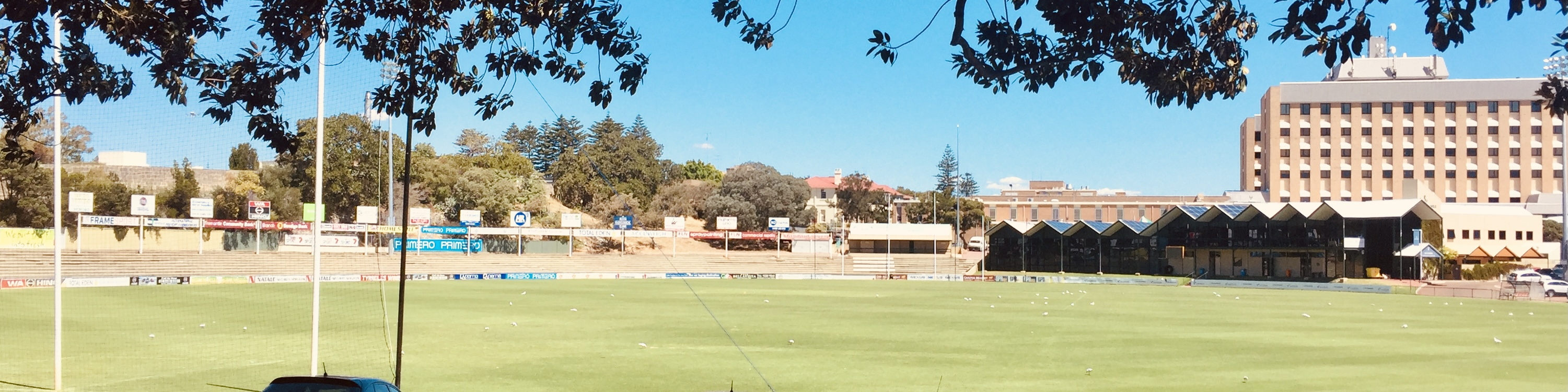
Fremantle Oval in 2016

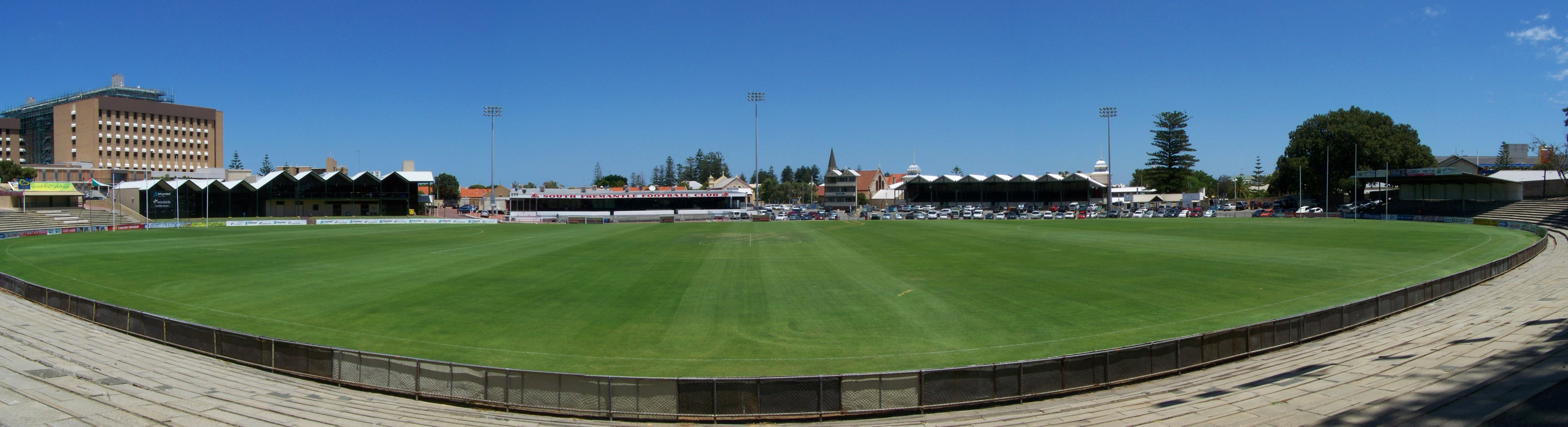
Panorama

== See also ==
- List of Australian rules football statues, a list of Australian rules football-related statues across Australia
