= Swan Medal =

AFL medal awarded in Perth, Australia

The Swan Medal is awarded to the player judged to be the fairest and best in the Swan Districts Football Club league team. The medal has been presented continuously since 1934 with the exception of 1942.

Year	Medallist	Reference
2025	Jesse Turner	
2024	Nik Rokahr	
2023	Jesse Turner	
2022	Jesse Turner	
2021	Frank Anderson	
2020	Corey Gault	
2019	George Hampson	
2018	Tony Notte	
2017	Corey Gault	
2016	Matt Riggio	
2015	Matt Riggio	
2014	Ryan Davis	
2013	Tony Notte	
2012	Shaun Hildebrandt	
2011	Tallan Ames	
2010	Andrew Krakouer	
2009	Josh Roberts	
2008	Josh Roberts & Garth Taylor	
2007	Luke Miles	
2006	Adam Lange	
2005	Shane Beros	
2004	Adam Lange	
2003	Shane Beros	
2002	Dwayne Griffin	
2001	Travis Edmonds	
2000	Travis Edmonds	
1999	Joel Cornelius	
1998	Joel Cornelius & Mark Piani	
1997	Travis Edmonds	
1996	Rod O'Neill	
1995	Geoff Passeri	
1994	Craig Callaghan	
1993	Travis Edmonds	
1992	Travis Edmonds	
1991	Phillip Narkle	
1990	Mick Grasso	
1989	Daniel Penny	
1988	Mick Grasso	
1987	Troy Ugle	
1986	Peter Sartori	
1985	Garry Sidebottom	
1984	Keith Narkle	
1983	Leon Baker	
1982	Ron Boucher	
1981	Phillip Narkle	
1980	Gerard Neesham	
1979	Gerard Neesham	
1978	Keith Narkle	
1977	Keith Narkle	
1976	Garry Sidebottom	
1975	Gary McDonald	
1974	Stan Nowotny	
1973	Peter Manning	
1972	Bob Beecroft	
1971	Peter Manning	
1970	Bill Walker	
1969	Bill Walker	
1968	Bill Walker	
1967	Peter Manning	
1966	Bill Walker	
1965	Bill Walker	
1964	Tony Nesbit	
1963	Haydn Bunton Jr.	
1962	Haydn Bunton Jr.	
1961	Haydn Bunton Jr.	
1960	Keith Slater	
1959	Walter Brown	
1958	Joe Lawson	
1957	Keith Slater	
1956	Keith Slater	
1955	Joseph Cox	
1954	Walter Sidebottom	
1953	Francis Sparrow	
1952	Edward Barker	
1951	Douglas Anderson	
1950	Joseph Pearce	
1949	Joseph Pearce	
1948	Douglas Anderson	
1947	John Murray	
1946	Douglas Anderson	
1945	Sydney Sinclair	
1944	James Davies	
1943	Laurence Bowen	
1941	Thomas Darmody	
1940	Clement Rosewarne	
1939	John Murray	
1938	Sydney Sinclair	
1937	Andrew Zilko	
1936	George Krepp	
1935	George Krepp	
1934	George Krepp	
