= 1984 WAFL season =

Australian rules football season

- Teams: 8
- Premiers: Swan Districts; 6th premiership
- Minor premiers: Swan Districts; 4th minor premiership
- Sandover Medallist: Peter Spencer (East Perth); Michael Mitchell (Claremont); Steve Malaxos (Claremont)
- Bernie Naylor Medallist: Brett Hutton (Swan Districts)

The 1984 WAFL season was the 100th season of the West Australian Football League and its various incarnations. The season opened on 31 March and concluded on 22 September with the 1984 WAFL Grand Final contested between East Fremantle and Swan Districts.

It saw Swan Districts record their sixth WAFL premiership, and its third in a row, after a slow start that had it win only half its games in the first fourteen rounds. East Fremantle returned to the Grand Final after four disappointing seasons with only 28 wins from 85 games. After an unsuccessful decade, Subiaco recalled former coach Haydn Bunton, Jr., and despite not improving their position in the seniors, were generally considered to have made major improvement with five more victories and a young reserves side winning the club's first premiership in any grade since their 1974 colts win. South Fremantle, who began with a number of spectacular performances fell away from second place with five losses in their final six games. Claremont lost three-time century goalkicker Warren Ralph to Carlton, and suffered severely from lacking a target in attack, especially as recruit Bruce Monteath suffered severely from injuries. The Tigers were last for five weeks early in the season and second from bottom before a winning streak of five games pushed them to third.

Off the field, the WAFL refused requests to allow telecasts of VFL matches in rural WA by the Golden West network.

== Home-and-away season ==
=== Round 1 ===
	Round 1				|
Saturday, 31 March	West Perth 15.11 (101)	def. by	Perth 18.18 (126)	Leederville Oval (crowd: 7989)
Saturday, 31 March	South Fremantle 24.12 (156)	def.	Claremont 18.15 (123)	Fremantle Oval (crowd: 10870)
Saturday, 31 March	East Fremantle 11.19 (85)	def. by	Subiaco 21.16 (142)	Subiaco Oval (crowd: 6723)
Sunday, 1 April	East Perth 19.13 (127)	def.	Swan Districts 16.17 (113)	Bunbury (crowd: 6573)
The WAFL plays its first game outside metropolitan Perth at Bunbury, and the move is regarded as a genuine success. Ultimately matches in country centres would become a regular part of WAFL scheduling.; East Perth, with a makeshift ruck due to the absence of 1983 Sandover winner John Ironmonger, record a surprise win led by future Collingwood star Michael Christian who dominates in defence.

=== Round 2 ===
	Round 2				|
Saturday, 7 April	East Perth 31.19 (205)	def.	West Perth 17.13 (115)	Perth Oval (crowd: 9150)
Saturday, 7 April	Perth 15.14 (104)	def. by	Subiaco 22.8 (140)	Lathlain Park (crowd: 7375)
Saturday, 7 April	Claremont 13.16 (94)	def. by	Swan Districts 18.14 (122)	Claremont Oval (crowd: 8177)
Saturday, 7 April	East Fremantle 17.13 (115)	def.	South Fremantle 15.17 (107)	East Fremantle Oval (crowd: 10953)
East Perth kicked their highest score against West Perth (equalled in 2007), as the Falcons have no answer to their running play. John Scott kicked eleven goals.

=== Round 3 ===
	Round 3				|
Saturday, 14 April	West Perth 17.11 (113)	def.	Subiaco 15.19 (109)	Leederville Oval (crowd: 7020)
Saturday, 14 April	Swan Districts 13.19 (97)	def. by	South Fremantle 20.12 (132)	Subiaco Oval (crowd: 12233)
Saturday, 14 April	Perth 25.18 (168)	def.	East Perth 13.9 (87)	Lathlain Park (crowd: 9873)
Saturday, 14 April	Claremont 15.13 (103)	def. by	East Fremantle 16.11 (107)	Claremont Oval (crowd: 6565)
Former Claremont assistant coach Murray Ward helps orchestrate a win over his former club by rotating the centre half-forward position and putting Paul Harding, normally a ruckman, in attack.

=== Round 4 (Easter weekend) ===
	Round 4				|
Saturday, 21 April	Subiaco 8.4 (52)	def. by	Claremont 16.17 (113)	Subiaco Oval (crowd: 9167)
Saturday, 21 April	East Fremantle 21.21 (147)	def.	West Perth 16.16 (112)	East Fremantle Oval (crowd: 7376)
Monday, 23 April	Swan Districts 23.27 (165)	def.	Perth 11.13 (79)	Bassendean Oval (crowd: 12989)
Monday, 23 April	East Perth 9.9 (63)	def. by	South Fremantle 33.23 (221)	Perth Oval (crowd: 13836)
In slippery conditions on the Saturday, Claremont's individual skill allows them to win their first game against the suddenly fashionable Lions, who played only one WA State player against seven by Claremont.; East Perth suffered the heaviest loss in its history, 158 points; this beat by 46 points the previous biggest losses in 1977 and 1929. During the last quarter, South Fremantle kicked 13.5 (83).; Don Holmes kicks nine goals as Swans overwhelm the initially promising Demons.

=== Round 5 ===
	Round 5				|
Saturday, 28 April	South Fremantle 15.29 (119)	def.	Perth 18.8 (116)	Fremantle Oval (crowd: 8478)
Saturday, 28 April	Subiaco 17.21 (123)	def.	East Perth 13.23 (101)	Subiaco Oval (crowd: 6314)
Saturday, 28 April	West Perth 15.19 (109)	def.	Claremont 12.21 (93)	Leederville Oval (crowd: 6820)
Saturday, 28 April	Swan Districts 13.13 (91)	def.	East Fremantle 12.14 (86)	Bassendean Oval (crowd: 11430)
Subiaco score 12.5 (77) for their highest second quarter score on record, but their decline after half-time sees a return to their poor form of previous seasons.; South Fremantle's win is the only occurrence in WA(N)FL history where the winning team has scored three fewer goals than the losing team.; In a thrilling Grand Final preview, East Fremantle come back from 21 points down before Ed Blackaby kicks the winner for Swans.

=== Round 6 ===
	Round 6				|
Saturday, 5 May	Subiaco 15.5 (95)	def. by	Swan Districts 16.9 (105)	Subiaco Oval (crowd: 7942)
Saturday, 5 May	West Perth 15.15 (105)	drew with	South Fremantle 16.9 (105)	Leederville Oval (crowd: 7790)
Saturday, 5 May	Claremont 6.12 (48)	def. by	East Perth 12.15 (87)	Claremont Oval (crowd: 5738)
Saturday, 5 May	East Fremantle 15.22 (112)	def.	Perth 15.13 (103)	East Fremantle Oval (crowd: 6843)
The draw at Leederville Oval was the first in 888 WA(N)FL games since Round 3 of 1974. This result ended the third longest non-occurrence of draws in a major Australian Rules competition. (Note: There were 948 WANFL games with no draws between Round 11, 1946 and Round 19, 1957 inclusive. More recently there was a sequence of 918 WAFL games with no draws between Round 12, 2012 and Round 14, 2022 inclusive. The SANFL record is over 788 games with no draws between Round 6, 1941 and Round 1, 1955 inclusive, and the VFL/AFL record is 470 games without a draw between Round 2, 1982 and the first half of Round 11, 1985, inclusive.)

=== Round 7 ===
	Round 7				|
Saturday, 12 May	Swan Districts 17.15 (117)	def. by	West Perth 18.15 (123)	Bassendean Oval (crowd: 10270)
Saturday, 12 May	South Fremantle 14.24 (108)	def.	Subiaco 11.14 (80)	Fremantle Oval (crowd: 8097)
Saturday, 12 May	Perth 10.19 (79)	def. by	Claremont 16.14 (110)	Lathlain Park (crowd: 6380)
Saturday, 12 May	East Perth 23.15 (153)	def.	East Fremantle 14.18 (102)	Subiaco Oval (crowd: 8657)

=== Round 8 ===
	Round 8				|
Saturday, 19 May	West Perth 16.16 (112)	def.	Perth 11.13 (79)	Subiaco Oval (crowd: 6953)
Saturday, 19 May	East Perth 14.8 (92)	def. by	Swan Districts 21.20 (146)	Perth Oval (crowd: 6930)
Saturday, 19 May	Claremont 13.13 (91)	def.	South Fremantle 9.12 (66)	Claremont Oval (crowd: 5433)
Saturday, 19 May	East Fremantle 24.16 (160)	def.	Subiaco 10.10 (70)	East Fremantle Oval (crowd: 4885)
East Fremantle produce an awesome display in wet weather to crush the improving Lions, with captain-coach Ron Alexander, the oldest WAFL player at the time, showing exceptional on-field direction and driving his team in the trying conditions.; Steve Malaxos, in his first game as captain, produces an exceptional effort for the Tigers to beat the top-placed Bulldogs and move from bottom place.

=== Round 9 ===
	Round 9				|
Saturday, 26 May	Subiaco 25.15 (165)	def.	West Perth 15.14 (104)	Subiaco Oval (crowd: 7890)
Saturday, 26 May	Swan Districts 14.11 (95)	def.	South Fremantle 12.15 (87)	Bassendean Oval (crowd: 8635)
Saturday, 26 May	East Perth 13.15 (93)	def.	Perth 12.15 (87)	Perth Oval (crowd: 4932)
Saturday, 26 May	East Fremantle 11.6 (72)	def. by	Claremont 12.14 (86)	East Fremantle Oval (crowd: 7075)
Swan Districts take top spot with a superb win in slippery conditions. Midfielder Brad Shine shows amazing courage to play after a gash in his eye.

=== Round 10 (Foundation Day) ===
	Round 10				|
Saturday, 2 June	Subiaco 32.12 (204)	def.	Perth 15.12 (102)	Subiaco Oval (crowd: 7092)
Saturday, 2 June	Swan Districts 12.12 (84)	def. by	Claremont 12.13 (85)	Bassendean Oval (crowd: 11100)
Monday, 4 June	West Perth 11.22 (88)	def.	East Perth 10.10 (70)	Leederville Oval (crowd: 14011)
Monday, 4 June	South Fremantle 24.27 (171)	def.	East Fremantle 15.14 (104)	Fremantle Oval (crowd: 17932)
Claremont record a fighting win to enter the top four after being last four rounds beforehand.; Subiaco kick their highest score in senior football to that point, beating 27.18 (180) in Round 9 of 1969 against Claremont. Clint Brown kicks nine and moves to the head of the goalkicking, and Frankston recruit Stephen Sells kicks six.

=== Round 11 ===
	Round 11				|
Saturday, 16 June	Perth 16.12 (108)	def.	Swan Districts 12.13 (85)	Lathlain Park (crowd: 6947)
Saturday, 16 June	South Fremantle 18.10 (118)	def. by	East Perth 18.18 (126)	Fremantle Oval (crowd: 7983)
Saturday, 16 June	Claremont 13.17 (95)	def. by	Subiaco 17.15 (117)	Claremont Oval (crowd: 9161)
Saturday, 16 June	West Perth 14.15 (99)	def. by	East Fremantle 23.13 (151)	Subiaco Oval (crowd: 9451)
Perth record their first win against Swan Districts since 1978, breaking a sequence of seventeen straight losses.; Subiaco kick eleven of the last twelve goals to come back for 42 points behind during the second quarter and move to a clear third and on course for a first finals berth since 1974.

=== Round 12 ===
	Round 12				|
Saturday, 23 June	Perth 19.13 (127)	def.	South Fremantle 16.24 (120)	Lathlain Park (crowd: 7272)
Saturday, 23 June	East Perth 17.15 (117)	def.	Subiaco 15.15 (105)	Perth Oval (crowd: 10438)
Saturday, 23 June	West Perth 21.20 (146)	def.	Claremont 9.14 (68)	Subiaco Oval (crowd: 8552)
Saturday, 23 June	East Fremantle 23.12 (150)	def.	Swan Districts 16.18 (114)	East Fremantle Oval (crowd: 8404)
Perth led by sixty-nine points just after half-time before South Fremantle, with Warren Mosconi shutting out Robert Wiley, staged a remarkable comeback that failed only due to poor kicking for goal.; East Fremantle's win leaves the reigning premiers in sixth place, having lost more games than in all of 1983.

=== Round 13 ===
	Round 13				|
Saturday, 30 June	Swan Districts 22.19 (151)	def.	Subiaco 6.10 (46)	Bassendean Oval (crowd: 7100)
Saturday, 30 June	West Perth 16.12 (108)	def. by	South Fremantle 20.17 (137)	Subiaco Oval (crowd: 10496)
Saturday, 30 June	East Perth 12.10 (82)	def. by	Claremont 19.15 (129)	Perth Oval (crowd: 6990)
Saturday, 30 June	Perth 11.13 (79)	def. by	East Fremantle 19.17 (131)	Lathlain Park (crowd: 7352)
The return of injury prone ruckman/forward Peter Sartori drives Swans to a thrashing of Subiaco on a bleakly windy and wet day.; With former East Perth ruckman Paul Arnold playing on with a fractured thumb, Jon Dorotich dominates in the unfamiliar role of ruckman as South return to form.

=== Round 14 ===
	Round 14				|
Saturday, 7 July	West Perth 18.11 (119)	def.	Swan Districts 11.19 (85)	Leederville Oval (crowd: 7146)
Saturday, 7 July	Subiaco 10.17 (77)	def. by	South Fremantle 15.15 (105)	Subiaco Oval (crowd: 6780)
Saturday, 7 July	Claremont 13.17 (95)	def.	Perth 6.16 (52)	Claremont Oval (crowd: 4197)
Saturday, 7 July	East Fremantle 10.15 (75)	def.	East Perth 8.8 (56)	East Fremantle Oval (crowd: 6465)

=== Round 15 ===
	Round 15				|
Saturday, 14 July	West Perth 17.19 (121)	def.	Perth 10.13 (73)	Leederville Oval (crowd: 5968)
Saturday, 14 July	Swan Districts 22.18 (150)	def.	East Perth 18.10 (118)	Bassendean Oval (crowd: 7100)
Saturday, 14 July	South Fremantle 23.26 (164)	def.	Claremont 13.8 (86)	Fremantle Oval (crowd: 8280)
Saturday, 14 July	Subiaco 16.13 (109)	def. by	East Fremantle 22.11 (143)	Subiaco Oval (crowd: 5521)
South Fremantle's intense pressure, along with teenage half-forward Nicky Winmar kicking seven goals and Stephen Mount 6.8 (44) from 22 kicks, allows them to crush Claremont and stay in second place.; Ron Alexander, normally a ruckman, kicks 9.0 at full-forward to continue Subiaco's fall from likely finalists mid-season.

=== Round 16 ===
	Round 16				|
Saturday, 21 July	East Perth 19.15 (129)	def.	West Perth 18.17 (125)	Perth Oval (crowd: 8505)
Saturday, 21 July	Perth 16.16 (112)	def. by	Subiaco 20.15 (135)	Lathlain Park (crowd: 3707)
Saturday, 21 July	Claremont 13.15 (93)	def. by	Swan Districts 25.15 (165)	Subiaco Oval (crowd: 7944)
Saturday, 21 July	East Fremantle 23.5 (143)	def.	South Fremantle 16.16 (112)	East Fremantle Oval (crowd: 17433)

=== Round 17 ===
	Round 17				|
Saturday, 28 July	West Perth 15.12 (102)	def. by	Subiaco 18.17 (125)	Leederville Oval (crowd: 7009)
Saturday, 28 July	South Fremantle 17.19 (121)	def. by	Swan Districts 21.15 (141)	Fremantle Oval (crowd: 11918)
Saturday, 28 July	Perth 24.18 (162)	def.	East Perth 14.16 (100)	Lathlain Park (crowd: 5477)
Saturday, 28 July	Claremont 19.18 (132)	def.	East Fremantle 15.17 (107)	Subiaco Oval (crowd: 6246)
The use of veterans Barry Beecroft (mostly a ruckman for the reserves) and Bruce Monteath (earlier injured) in the key forward positions finally provide Claremont's attack with its former potency as the Tigers down the ladder leaders more convincingly than the score suggests.; Stephen Sells' seven goals, including four brilliant second-quarter snaps, ensures Subiaco stay ahead of the Falcons in the battle for fourth place.

=== Round 18 ===
	Round 18				|
Saturday, 4 August	Perth 13.8 (86)	def. by	Swan Districts 21.16 (142)	Subiaco Oval (crowd: 6293)
Saturday, 4 August	East Perth 22.7 (139)	def.	South Fremantle 16.16 (112)	Perth Oval (crowd: 6177)
Saturday, 4 August	Claremont 15.18 (108)	def.	Subiaco 15.10 (100)	Claremont Oval (crowd: 6675)
Saturday, 4 August	East Fremantle 24.9 (153)	def.	West Perth 16.14 (110)	East Fremantle Oval (crowd: 6456)
As coach Mal Brown announced he will be stepping down because his hard training methods are failing, one-time flag favourites South Fremantle are reminded that talent is no substitute for strength and persistence.; The return of utility Wayne Cormack from a holiday in Europe is a vital reinforcement for East Fremantle as they strive to seal their place in the top two.

=== Round 19 ===
	Round 19				|
Saturday, 11 August	South Fremantle 24.19 (163)	def.	Perth 8.10 (58)	Fremantle Oval (crowd: 5050)
Saturday, 11 August	Subiaco 19.10 (124)	def. by	East Perth 21.11 (137)	Subiaco Oval (crowd: 6699)
Saturday, 11 August	Claremont 11.18 (84)	def.	West Perth 9.20 (74)	Claremont Oval (crowd: 6855)
Saturday, 11 August	Swan Districts 23.15 (153)	def.	East Fremantle 17.14 (116)	Bassendean Oval (crowd: 10103)
Gerard Neesham's skill with hand and foot plus the blistering pace of wingmen Keith Narkle and Shane Renfree give Swan Districts top place and favoritism for a hat-trick of flags with odds of 5-to-4.

=== Round 20 ===
	Round 20				|
Saturday, 18 August	Subiaco 17.21 (123)	def. by	Swan Districts 22.10 (142)	Subiaco Oval (crowd: 6416)
Saturday, 18 August	West Perth 15.16 (106)	def.	South Fremantle 13.16 (94)	Leederville Oval (crowd: 6079)
Saturday, 18 August	Claremont 15.11 (101)	def.	East Perth 13.16 (94)	Claremont Oval (crowd: 8070)
Saturday, 18 August	East Fremantle 16.14 (110)	def.	Perth 8.9 (57)	East Fremantle Oval (crowd: 3896)
Claremont's win seals a sixth successive finals appearance and leaves East Perth needing to rely on South Fremantle losing to gain a place, whilst Swan Districts' brilliant third quarter in slippery conditions secures the double chance.

=== Round 21 ===
	Round 21				|
Saturday, 25 August	Swan Districts 19.15 (129)	def.	West Perth 15.7 (97)	Bassendean Oval (crowd: 9182)
Saturday, 25 August	South Fremantle 9.13 (67)	def. by	Subiaco 18.11 (119)	Fremantle Oval (crowd: 7325)
Saturday, 25 August	Perth 21.17 (143)	def. by	Claremont 31.17 (203)	Lathlain Park (crowd: 5104)
Saturday, 25 August	East Perth 20.10 (130)	def.	East Fremantle 15.16 (106)	Perth Oval (crowd: 8028)
South Fremantle's second-quarter capitulation kicking 0.1 (1) to Subiaco's 8.2 (50) – with the club under a crisis due to internal dissent, coach Brown's resignation and Benny Vigona refusing to play in defence – allows East Perth to take the last place in the four with its win.; Perth and Claremont scored an aggregate of 346 points. As of 2013, this is the third highest aggregate score in WA(N)FL history. The second quarter aggregate of 18.4 (112) is the second highest on record and the highest before 1990.

== Ladder ==
1984 WAFL ladder
Pos	Team	Pld	W	L	D	PF	PA	PP	Pts
1	Swan Districts (P)	21	14	7	0	2592	2177	119.1	56
2	East Fremantle	21	13	8	0	2475	2289	108.1	52
3	Claremont	21	12	9	0	2140	2178	98.3	48
4	East Perth	21	11	10	0	2306	2518	91.6	44
5	South Fremantle	21	10	10	1	2585	2219	116.5	42
6	West Perth	21	9	11	1	2289	2444	93.7	38
7	Subiaco	21	9	12	0	2360	2374	99.4	36
8	Perth	21	5	16	0	2100	2648	79.3	20

Rules for classification: 1) points; 2) percentage; 3) number of points for.
(P) Premiers

== Finals ==
=== First semi-final ===
	First semi-final
Saturday, 1 September	Claremont 23.10 (148)	def.	East Perth 18.18 (126)	Subiaco Oval (crowd: 20,000)
Claremont continue their improved attacking form to run away from the Royals at the finish. Steve Malaxos dominates in the centre and Daniels kicks 7.5 (47).

=== Second semi-final ===
	Second semi-final
Saturday, 8 September	Swan Districts 10.16 (76)	def. by	East Fremantle 15.12 (102)	Subiaco Oval (crowd: 20,000)
A five-minute burst of as many goals early in the second quarter – in which they total 8.6 (54) – ensures East Fremantle of victory over the Swans, who were handicapped by the loss of several key backmen.

=== Preliminary final ===
	Preliminary final
Saturday, 15 September	Claremont 14.9 (93)	def. by	Swan Districts 16.18 (114)	Subiaco Oval
Swan Districts achieve a solid win after being 30 points down ten minutes into the second quarter as Todd's reorganisation of the team pays off.

=== Grand Final ===
1984 WAFL Grand Final
Saturday, 22 September	East Fremantle	def. by	Swan Districts	Subiaco Oval (crowd: 41,831)
0.3 (3); 9.8 (62); 13.8 (86); 15.12 (102)	Q1; Q2; Q3; Final	10.7 (67); 11.8 (74); 16.12 (108); 20.18 (138)	Umpires: David Johnson, Mike Ball; Simpson Medal: Barry Kimberley (Swan Districts)
Taylor 4, Bennett 4, Kickett 3, Waterson 2, Wilson, Wake	Goals	Holmes 5, Shine 5, Hutton 5, Marshall 2, Sartori, Langsford, Neesham
Green, Ellis, Wrensted, Forman, Wilson, Rankin, Browning	Best	Shine, Kimberley, Johns, Neesham, Holmes, Solin, Rance, Fogarty
Swan Districts under John Todd completed their second premiership hat-trick, despite having only eleven of their 1983 team due to losses to the VFL and retirement.
