= 1935 WANFL season =

Australian rules football season

- Teams: 8
- Premiers: West Perth; 7th premiership
- Minor premiers: Subiaco; 5th minor premiership
- Sandover Medallist: Lou Daily (Subiaco); George Krepp (Swan Districts) (Note: WANFL President Walter Stooke gave a casting vote to Daily, but Bob Bryant noted that Krepp had received eight first votes to Daily's seven, and should according to the "countback" rule of the time have won, so that the WANFL had to strike a second medal.)
- Leading goalkicker: George Doig (East Fremantle)
- Matches played: 76

The 1935 WANFL season was the 51st season of the Western Australian National Football League. The season saw West Perth win the premiership under the coaching of Johnny Leonard; it was the only time in West Perth's history that it won consecutive premierships, preceding a brief but exceptionally steep decline that saw the Cardinals four years later suffer the equal longest losing streak in WA(N)FL history.

This season saw Claremont-Cottesloe under new president Pat Rodriguez change its name to "Claremont", and at first gave promise of great improvement before returning to their worst 1934 form. 1934 finalists Victoria Park lost defenders Shepherd, A. Brown, Hungerford and Patrick Fitzgerald in the off-season to retirement or major injuries and failed to cope with these problems, finishing last for the only time in open-age competition between 1924 and 1980. In contrast, Subiaco, who had been disappointing in 1934 with just seven victories, regained Lou Daily from Geelong and Collingwood to signal the end of a major exodus to the VFL. Daily's brilliant play in defence, and the acquisition of Frank Murphy from the Magpies as captain-coach, made the Maroons the best team in the competition for much of 1935, but West Perth's defence was too much in the Grand Final and Subiaco were to have a third of a century as a cellar-dweller before their next premiership in 1973.

The Sandover Medal count was marred by overlooking a clause in the rules to deal with a tie – Lou Daily was initially awarded the Medal on the casting vote of WANFL President Walter Stooke and became the first full-back to win a "best-and-fairest" medal in any leading Australian Rules state, but on 21 September it was pointed out that George Krepp should have won through having received one more three-vote than Daily. Ultimately the WANFL had no choice but to strike a second medal, which was given to Krepp at the League meeting on 16 October.

== Home-and-away season ==
=== Round 1 (Labour Day) ===
	Round 1
Saturday, 4 May (2:45 pm)	East Fremantle 19.10 (124)	def.	South Fremantle 11.17 (83)	Fremantle Oval
Saturday, 4 May (2:45 pm)	Subiaco 14.15 (99)	def.	Swan Districts 10.12 (72)	Subiaco Oval
Saturday, 4 May (2:45 pm)	Claremont 16.16 (112)	def.	Victoria Park 12.11 (83)	Claremont Oval (crowd: 955)
Monday, 6 May (2:45 pm)	West Perth 17.17 (119)	def.	East Perth 11.15 (81)	Leederville Oval
Clarence Hooper, in his first match for the Tigers, shows that the hype he received in the pre-season is justified with a clear best-on-ground display in his WANFL debut.

=== Round 2 ===
	Round 2
Saturday, 11 May (2:45 pm)	Victoria Park 11.7 (73)	def. by	East Fremantle 19.10 (124)	WACA
Saturday, 11 May (2:45 pm)	Swan Districts 13.10 (88)	def.	West Perth 9.9 (63)	Bassendean Oval
Saturday, 11 May (2:45 pm)	East Perth 14.11 (95)	def. by	Subiaco 18.19 (127)	Perth Oval
Saturday, 11 May (2:45 pm)	South Fremantle 15.10 (100)	def. by	Claremont 18.16 (124)	Fremantle Oval
George Doig, following on from his record 1934 season, kicked twelve goals against Victoria Park.

=== Round 3 ===
	Round 3
Saturday, 18 May (2:45 pm)	East Fremantle 20.16 (136)	def.	Swan Districts 14.11 (95)	Fremantle Oval
Saturday, 18 May (2:45 pm)	Claremont 6.9 (45)	def. by	East Perth 12.17 (89)	Claremont Oval
Saturday, 18 May (2:45 pm)	Subiaco 21.12 (138)	def.	South Fremantle 14.7 (91)	Subiaco Oval
Saturday, 18 May (2:45 pm)	West Perth 19.19 (133)	def.	Victoria Park 11.11 (77)	Leederville Oval
George Doig kicked a further ten goals against Swan Districts.

=== Round 4 ===
	Round 4
Saturday, 25 May (2:45 pm)	Swan Districts 13.10 (88)	def.	Claremont 14.13 (97)	Bassendean Oval
Saturday, 25 May (2:45 pm)	East Perth 11.22 (88)	def. by	East Fremantle 15.13 (103)	Perth Oval
Saturday, 25 May (2:45 pm)	South Fremantle 9.8 (62)	def. by	West Perth 11.16 (82)	Fremantle Oval
Saturday, 25 May (2:45 pm)	Victoria Park 15.12 (102)	def. by	Subiaco 18.17 (125)	WACA
East Perth kicked 5.12 (42) with the wind in the third quarter, allowing East Fremantle to win.; Jack Jennings kicks thirteen goals against the depleted Victoria Park defence, a total not equalled for Subiaco until Austin Robertson junior kicked fifteen in 1968 against East Fremantle.

=== Round 5 (Foundation Day) ===
	Round 5
Saturday, 1 June (2:45 pm)	East Perth 13.11 (89)	def.	Swan Districts 12.10 (82)	Perth Oval
Saturday, 1 June (2:45 pm)	Claremont 10.9 (69)	def.	East Fremantle 9.12 (66)	Claremont Oval
Saturday, 1 June (2:45 pm)	South Fremantle 18.21 (129)	def.	Victoria Park 8.11 (59)	Fremantle Oval
Monday, 3 June (2:45 pm)	Subiaco 10.10 (70)	def. by	West Perth 13.13 (91)	Subiaco Oval (crowd: 9578)
Following its loss to West Perth, Subiaco protested on the grounds that former Collingwood player Jack Beveridge had played without the proper permit. The protest was upheld, and Subiaco was awarded the match points for the game.

=== Round 6 ===
	Round 6
Saturday, 8 June (2:45 pm)	East Fremantle 14.14 (98)	def.	Subiaco 15.7 (97)	Fremantle Oval
Saturday, 8 June (2:45 pm)	West Perth 11.18 (84)	def.	Claremont 12.7 (79)	Leederville Oval
Saturday, 8 June (2:45 pm)	Victoria Park 12.14 (86)	def. by	East Perth 24.19 (163)	WACA
Saturday, 8 June (2:45 pm)	Swan Districts 8.15 (63)	def. by	South Fremantle 17.14 (116)	Bassendean Oval

=== Round 7 ===
	Round 7
Saturday, 15 June (2:45 pm)	East Fremantle 14.17 (101)	def.	West Perth 6.19 (55)	Fremantle Oval
Saturday, 15 June (2:45 pm)	Victoria Park 15.14 (104)	def.	Swan Districts 10.12 (72)	WACA
Saturday, 15 June (2:45 pm)	East Perth 13.22 (100)	def.	South Fremantle 10.16 (76)	Perth Oval
Saturday, 15 June (2:45 pm)	Claremont 14.12 (96)	def. by	Subiaco 20.11 (131)	Claremont Oval

=== First interstate match ===
First interstate match
Saturday, 22 June (2:45 pm)	Western Australia	def. by	Victoria	Perth Oval (crowd: 25,500)
1.2 (8); 7.4 (46); 11.4 (70); 13.10 (88)	Q1; Q2; Q3; Final	5.6 (36); 9.10 (64); 14.17 (101); 18.18 (126)	Umpires: Jack McMurray senior
George Doig, Davey 3.0; Anderson 1.4; Stewart Daily, Norm McDiarmid, Rainoldi, Richardson 1.1; Lawn, McGlinn 1.0; Walsh, Ryan 0.1	Goals	6.2 Beames; 4.3 Green; 3.1 Morrison; 2.2 Evans; 1.5 Hartnett; 1.2 Dyer; 1.0 Collier; 0.2 Taylor; 0.1 Bisset, Mills
Bowe, McDiarmid, Rainoldi, Clarke, Batt, Davey	Best	Shea (best on ground), Beames, Regan, Collier, Huxtable, Dick Reynolds, Gandion
Injuries	Martin (ribs)
Western Australia's lack of system and the strength of Regan in defence ensure a convincing defeat.

=== Second interstate match ===
Second interstate match
Tuesday, 25 June (2:45 pm)	Western Australia	def. by	Victoria	Leederville Oval (crowd: 11,221)
3.0 (18); 6.1 (37); 9.4 (58); 11.6 (72)	Q1; Q2; Q3; Final	5.2 (32); 7.10 (52); 8.11 (59); 12.13 (85)	Umpires: Jack McMurray senior
George Doig 5.1; Reynolds 3.0; Rainoldi 1.1; Ditchburn, McDiarmid 1.0; J. Anderson, Ryan 0.1	Goals	3.3 Green; 2.3 Hartnett; 2.2 Dick Reynolds; 2.1 Evans; 2.0 Beames; 1.1 Nash; 0.1 Shea, Lewis
Rainoldi, McDiarmid, Krepp, Tetley, Lawn, Clarke	Best	Shea (best on ground), Dick Reynolds, Regan, Evans, Beames, Anderson
A second defeat, although the match was closer than the Saturday encounter, revealed Western Australia's definite weakness in key positions.

=== Round 8 ===
	Round 8
Saturday, 29 June (2:45 pm)	Swan Districts 10.9 (69)	def. by	Subiaco 18.11 (119)	Bassendean Oval
Saturday, 29 June (2:45 pm)	East Perth 15.11 (101)	def.	West Perth 12.12 (84)	Perth Oval
Saturday, 29 June (2:45 pm)	Victoria Park 11.13 (79)	def. by	Claremont 15.11 (101)	WACA
Saturday, 29 June (2:45 pm)	South Fremantle 9.19 (73)	def. by	East Fremantle 15.21 (111)	Fremantle Oval
Claremont enters the top four with its fifth win, but it proved the club's last win for the season.

=== Round 9 ===
	Round 9
Saturday, 6 July (2:45 pm)	Subiaco 15.8 (98)	def.	East Perth 12.16 (88)	Subiaco Oval
Saturday, 6 July (2:45 pm)	Claremont 10.8 (68)	def. by	South Fremantle 17.9 (111)	Claremont Oval
Saturday, 6 July (2:45 pm)	East Fremantle 14.14 (98)	def. by	Victoria Park 17.13 (115)	Fremantle Oval
Saturday, 6 July (2:45 pm)	West Perth 14.17 (101)	def.	Swan Districts 11.11 (77)	Leederville Oval
Victoria Park kicked eight goals in the final quarter to defeat East Fremantle and hand over bottom position to Swan Districts. Gook's marking was spectacular.

=== Round 10 ===
	Round 10
Saturday, 13 July (2:45 pm)	South Fremantle 17.15 (117)	def.	Subiaco 16.12 (108)	Fremantle Oval
Saturday, 13 July (2:45 pm)	Victoria Park 7.7 (49)	def. by	West Perth 11.15 (81)	WACA
Saturday, 13 July (2:45 pm)	East Perth 12.12 (84)	def.	Claremont 10.15 (75)	Perth Oval
Saturday, 13 July (2:45 pm)	Swan Districts 14.11 (95)	def.	East Fremantle 9.16 (70)	Bassendean Oval
For a second successive round East Fremantle lose to the bottom club, jeopardising their second semi-final berth.

=== WANFL Second XVIII v Goldfields ===
	Western Australian National Football League Second XVIII v Goldfields Football League
Saturday, 20 July (2:45 pm)	Western Australian National Football League Second XVIII 16.18 (114)	def.	Goldfields Football League 11.22 (88)	Leederville Oval
A WANFL "second eighteen" (Note: The "first eighteen" of Western Australia was in Adelaide playing South Australia for this weekend.) struggles against the powerful Goldfields league, despite wet conditions unfamiliar to players from that region. The Goldfields were especially impressive in high marking.

=== Round 11 ===
	Round 11
Saturday, 27 July (2:45 pm)	Subiaco 18.18 (126)	def.	Victoria Park 13.16 (94)	Subiaco Oval
Saturday, 27 July (2:45 pm)	East Fremantle 15.18 (108)	def. by	East Perth 18.16 (124)	Fremantle Oval
Saturday, 27 July (2:45 pm)	Claremont 11.8 (74)	def. by	Swan Districts 13.15 (93)	Claremont Oval
Saturday, 27 July (2:45 pm)	West Perth 18.8 (116)	def.	South Fremantle 7.11 (53)	Leederville Oval

=== Round 12 ===
	Round 12
Saturday, 3 August (2:45 pm)	West Perth 10.8 (68)	def.	Subiaco 9.7 (61)	Leederville Oval
Saturday, 3 August (2:45 pm)	Victoria Park 12.10 (82)	def. by	South Fremantle 14.16 (100)	WACA
Saturday, 3 August (2:45 pm)	East Fremantle 21.14 (140)	def.	Claremont 9.8 (62)	Fremantle Oval
Saturday, 3 August (2:45 pm)	Swan Districts 10.18 (78)	def. by	East Perth 12.12 (84)	Bassendean Oval
The top four moved three games clear of the bottom four with only six more rounds to be played, and with George Doig kicking eight goals and Kingsbury five East Fremantle end a worrying slump against the Tigers, who had now lost their last four.

=== Round 13 ===
	Round 13
Saturday, 10 August (2:45 pm)	East Perth 13.17 (95)	def.	Victoria Park 11.12 (78)	Perth Oval
Saturday, 10 August (2:45 pm)	South Fremantle 10.12 (72)	def. by	Swan Districts 11.21 (87)	Fremantle Oval
Saturday, 10 August (2:45 pm)	Claremont 9.4 (58)	def. by	West Perth 12.16 (88)	Claremont Oval
Saturday, 10 August (2:45 pm)	Subiaco 11.14 (80)	def.	East Fremantle 7.13 (55)	Subiaco Oval

=== Round 14 ===
	Round 14
Saturday, 17 August (2:45 pm)	Swan Districts 11.16 (82)	def. by	Victoria Park 14.16 (100)	Bassendean Oval
Saturday, 17 August (2:45 pm)	South Fremantle 14.15 (99)	def.	East Perth 12.25 (97)	Fremantle Oval
Saturday, 17 August (2:45 pm)	West Perth 17.11 (113)	def.	East Fremantle 11.19 (85)	Leederville Oval
Saturday, 17 August (2:45 pm)	Subiaco 17.13 (115)	def.	Claremont 10.21 (81)	Subiaco Oval
Victoria Park, after trailing at half time by 45 points – 1.7 (13) to 8.10 (58) – came from behind to defeat Swan Districts.; South Fremantle recover from having only five scoring shots to 22 in the first half for a thrilling win to be two games out of the four but face a tough draw to finish.

=== Round 15 ===
	Round 15
Saturday, 24 August (2:45 pm)	East Fremantle 16.16 (112)	def.	South Fremantle 10.11 (71)	Fremantle Oval
Saturday, 24 August (2:45 pm)	Claremont 11.13 (79)	def. by	Subiaco 13.17 (95)	Claremont Oval
Saturday, 24 August (2:45 pm)	Victoria Park 8.9 (57)	def. by	East Perth 10.16 (76)	WACA
Saturday, 24 August (2:45 pm)	Swan Districts 11.10 (76)	def. by	West Perth 19.11 (125)	Bassendean Oval
Ted Tyson (West Perth) kicked 10.6 (66) against Swan Districts.

=== Round 16 ===
	Round 16
Saturday, 31 August (2:45 pm)	East Perth 17.20 (122)	def.	Swan Districts 11.11 (77)	Perth Oval
Saturday, 31 August (2:45 pm)	Claremont 2.10 (22)	def. by	West Perth 14.8 (92)	Claremont Oval
Saturday, 31 August (2:45 pm)	South Fremantle 7.18 (60)	def. by	Subiaco 12.16 (88)	Fremantle Oval
Saturday, 31 August (2:45 pm)	Victoria Park 9.3 (57)	def. by	East Fremantle 13.18 (96)	WACA
Claremont kicks its lowest score to date in the WA(N)FL, beating 3.7 (25) against Subiaco in 1932, and the smallest overall in the WA(N)FL between 1927 and 1943.; Albert Skinner kicks both Claremont's goals, the first seven minutes into the third quarter, whilst Tyson scores nine for the Cardinals in boisterous conditions.; George Doig kicked his hundredth goal for the third successive season in the last quarter.

=== Round 17 ===
	Round 17
Saturday, 7 September (2:45 pm)	Claremont 12.7 (79)	def. by	East Perth 27.21 (183)	Claremont Oval
Saturday, 7 September (2:45 pm)	Swan Districts 14.14 (98)	def.	Victoria Park 13.13 (91)	Bassendean Oval
Saturday, 7 September (2:45 pm)	West Perth 16.19 (115)	def.	South Fremantle 10.13 (73)	Leederville Oval
Saturday, 7 September (2:45 pm)	Subiaco 15.8 (98)	def. by	East Fremantle 19.15 (129)	Subiaco Oval
East Perth fell one point short of the existing record WA(N)FL score, against a Claremont team which had lost eight matches in a row. The score remains the highest by a visiting team at Claremont Oval.; Ted Tyson (West Perth) kicked seven goals to kick his hundredth goal for the season.; Newly promoted forward Ted Holdsworth kicked eight for Swan Districts, as they ensure 1934 finalist Victoria Park, who had to recall committeeman French to field eighteen fit players finish with the wooden spoon.

=== Round 18 ===
	Round 18
Saturday, 14 September (2:45 pm)	Swan Districts 16.17 (113)	def.	South Fremantle 10.9 (69)	Subiaco Oval
Saturday, 14 September (2:45 pm)	East Perth 9.8 (62)	def. by	Subiaco 16.16 (112)	Perth Oval
Saturday, 14 September (2:45 pm)	Victoria Park 20.14 (134)	def.	Claremont 9.8 (62)	WACA
Saturday, 14 September (2:45 pm)	East Fremantle 12.15 (87)	def.	West Perth 8.16 (64)	Fremantle Oval

== Ladder ==
1935 WANFL ladder
Pos	Team	Pld	W	L	D	PF	PA	PP	Pts
1	Subiaco	18	14	4	0	1887	1547	122.0	56
2	West Perth (P)	18	13	5	0	1674	1300	128.8	52
3	East Fremantle	18	12	6	0	1843	1512	121.9	48
4	East Perth	18	12	6	0	1821	1583	115.0	48
5	South Fremantle	18	6	12	0	1555	1787	87.0	24
6	Swan Districts	18	6	12	0	1505	1731	86.9	24
7	Claremont	18	5	13	0	1383	1855	74.6	20
8	Victoria Park	18	4	14	0	1520	1873	81.2	16

Rules for classification: 1) points; 2) percentage; 3) number of points for.
(P) Premiers

== Finals ==
=== First semi-final ===
	First semi-final
Saturday, 21 September (2:45 pm)	East Fremantle 8.13 (61)	def. by	East Perth 9.18 (72)	Leederville Oval (crowd: 8,411)
In a fast, high-speed game in wet and slippery conditions, East Perth came from behind to win after East Fremantle had opened with four goals to none with the breeze in the first quarter.

=== Second semi-final ===
	Second semi-final
Saturday, 28 September (2:45 pm)	Subiaco 13.9 (87)	def.	West Perth 9.17 (71)	Perth Oval (crowd: 12,728)
Subiaco, aided by the return of Lou Daily from Victoria, defeated West Perth to reach their third Grand Final in five seasons.

=== Preliminary final ===
	Preliminary final
Saturday, 5 October (2:45 pm)	West Perth 10.17 (77)	def.	East Perth 11.4 (70)	Subiaco Oval (crowd: 11,808)
Retiring follower Jack McDiarmid was the outstanding player as West Perth came from behind to defeat an East Perth in a very fast game.

=== Grand Final ===
1935 WANFL Grand Final
Saturday, 12 October (2:15 pm)	Subiaco	def. by	West Perth	Perth Oval
2.1 (13); 2.5 (17); 5.7 (37); 7.9 (51)	Q1; Q2; Q3; Final	3.5 (23); 5.5 (35); 8.5 (53); 11.8 (74)	Umpires: George Owens
Mills 2, Richardson 2, Roe, Green, Stewart Daily	Goals	Tyson 5, Yates, McDiarmid, Anderson, Beveridge, Rainoldi, Marinko
Davies (best on ground), Bowe, Briggs, Lou Daily, Strack, Murphy	Best	Beveridge, Morgan, Benton, Flemming, Sanderson, Shuttleworth, Anderson, Rainoldi
This was the last ever WANFL Grand Final at Perth Oval.
