= Narkle =

Narkle is a surname. Notable people with the surname include:

- Johny Narkle (born 2001), Australian basketball player
- Keith Narkle (born 1952), Australian rules footballer
- Lynette Narkle (born 1946), Australian actor and director
- Phil Narkle (born 1961), Australian rules footballer
- Quinton Narkle (born 1997), Australian rules footballer
