= Haydn Bunton =

Haydn Bunton may refer to:

- Haydn Bunton Sr. (1911–1955), Australian rules footballer
- Haydn Bunton Jr. (born 1937), Australian rules footballer
