= Cyril Litterick =

Australian rules footballer

Personal information
- Full name: Cyril Oliver Litterick
- Born: 24 December 1936; Western Australia
- Died: 25 January 1986 (aged 49)
- Original team: East Perth (WANFL)
- Height: 191 cm (6 ft 3 in)
- Weight: 85 kg (187 lb)

Playing career^{1}
Years	Club	Games (Goals)
1958–1966	Swan Districts	179
- ^{1} Playing statistics correct to the end of 1966.

Career highlights
- Premiership Player (WANFL) 1961,1962 and 1963.; WA State Team 1966

Cyril Oliver Litterick was an Australian rules footballer who was highly successful in the West Australian National Football League (WANFL) playing for the Swan Districts Football Club. He was regarded as a formidable ruckman and able to kick goals while resting in the forward pocket. Litterick was recruited by Swan Districts in 1958 (the same year that Fred Castledine joined) from East Perth Football Club. Besides being a highly regarded football player, Litterick was also a police officer in the West Australian Police Force.
