= Tom Mullooly =

Australian rules footballer and cricketer

Personal information
- Full name: Thomas Cade Mullooly
- Born: 30 January 1954 (age 72); Mount Lawley, Western Australia
- Position: Fullback

Playing career^{1}
Years	Club	Games (Goals)
1971–1986	Swan Districts	246

Representative team honours
Years	Team	Games (Goals)
1973	Western Australia	1 (0)

Coaching career
Years	Club	Games (W–L–D)
1990	Perth	21 (7–14–0)
- ^{1} Playing statistics correct to the end of 1986.

Career highlights
- Premiership player 1982, 1984

Thomas Cade Mullooly (born 30 January 1954) is a former Australian rules footballer who was highly successful in the West Australian Football League (WAFL) playing for the Swan Districts Football Club.

Mullooly joined the club in 1971 (the same year as Ron Boucher) when the club were struggling and only won four games in the season. In 1973 Mullooly was selected for the WA state team and played on the wing against Victoria, who beat WA by 80 points. Part of the successful 1982 premiership side, Mullooly played at full back and was considered one of the team's best players. Absent from the 1983 grand final win due to injury, he played in the successful 1984 side as a fullback.

In the 1976–77 cricket season, Mullooly played one first-class and one List A match for Western Australia as a right-arm fast-medium bowler.

After his long career at Swan Districts, he was named as a reserve in their Team of the Century and is a life member.

Perth Football Club offered Mullooly a position as coach in 1990, which he did for one season before Ken Armstrong took the position.
