= 1963 WANFL season =

Australian rules football season

- Teams: 8
- Premiers: Swan Districts; 3rd premiership
- Minor premiers: Perth; 2nd minor premiership
- Matches played: 84

The 1963 WANFL season was the 79th season of the various incarnations of the Western Australian National Football League.

== Home-and-away season ==
=== Round 1 ===
	Round 1
Saturday, 6 April	South Fremantle 9.16 (70)	def. by	Perth 18.28 (136)	Fremantle Oval (crowd: 9,137)
Saturday, 6 April	East Perth 14.9 (93)	def. by	Subiaco 16.14 (110)	Perth Oval (crowd: 7,745)
Saturday, 6 April	Claremont 8.13 (61)	def. by	West Perth 21.12 (138)	Claremont Oval (crowd: 7,778)
Saturday, 6 April	Swan Districts 13.10 (88)	def.	East Fremantle 12.15 (87)	Bassendean Oval (crowd: 9,350)

== Ladder ==
1963 ladder
Pos	Team	Pld	W	L	D	PF	PA	PP	Pts
1	Perth	21	15	6	0	1970	1910	103.1	60
2	East Fremantle	21	14	7	0	2039	1754	116.2	56
3	East Perth	21	13	8	0	2128	1856	114.7	52
4	Swan Districts (P)	21	13	8	0	2073	1845	112.4	52
5	West Perth	21	11	10	0	1922	1816	105.8	44
6	Subiaco	21	8	13	0	1841	1985	92.7	32
7	South Fremantle	21	6	15	0	1666	2039	81.7	24
8	Claremont	21	4	17	0	1693	2127	79.6	16

Source: WAFL Footy Facts
Rules for classification: 1) points; 2) percentage; 3) number of points for.
(P) Premiers

== Finals ==
=== Grand Final ===
1963 WANFL Grand Final
Saturday, 5 October	East Fremantle	def. by	Swan Districts	Subiaco Oval (crowd: 41,101)
5.4; 6.10; 11.10; 13.12 (90)	Q1; Q2; Q3; Final	2.3; 7.5; 12.6; 17.10 (112)	Umpires: Ray Scott; Simpson Medal: Ken Bagley (Swan Districts)
