= Fred Castledine =

Australian rules footballer (1937–2019)

Personal information
- Full name: Frederick Thomas James Castledine
- Born: 2 May 1937
- Died: 20 January 2019 (aged 81); Perth, Australia

Playing career^{1}
Years	Club	Games (Goals)
1958–1969	Swan Districts	162 (44)
- ^{1} Playing statistics correct to the end of 1969.

Frederick Thomas James Castledine (2 May 1937 – 20 January 2019) was an Australian rules football player who played for the Swan Districts Football Club in the WAFL throughout the late 1950s and 1960s.

His career with Swan Districts commenced in 1958 when the Swans were languishing at the bottom of the league ladder. He is described as a strong and versatile player with good skills and endurance. The club's fortunes rapidly improved with the appointment of Haydn Bunton, Jr. as senior coach at the end of the 1960 season, after Swan Districts had finished at the bottom of the ladder. Castletine was a member of perhaps the greatest team that has played for the club and who won the WAFL premiership flag in 1961, 1962 and 1963. In the 1961 Grand Final against East Perth, Castledine played an interesting but important role as a ruck rover. Castledine effectively negated the performance of champion ruckman Graham "Polly" Farmer by engaging in a series of physical engagements that left Keith Slater free to dominate in the ruck contests. In the 1962 Grand Final Castledine also played on the ball as a ruck rover in the victory against East Fremantle. Castledine was moved to the centre half back position for the 1963 Grand Final and played an outstanding game once again so that the Swans were victorious. An important player throughout 1964 Castledine won the Swan Medal for that year. By 1965 Castledine had become the captain/coach of Swan Districts and remained in that position for the 1966 and 1967 seasons. Swan Districts finished as minor premiers by being at the top of the ladder at the end the 1965 season made it as far as the Grand Final in 1965 but lost the game in a third quarter fade out to East Fremantle. A valuable contributor to the team and a great clubman, Fred Castledine played 162 games for Swan Districts from 1958–1969. He also represented the WA state team in 1961–1964 and was selected at centre half back in the Swan Districts team of the century.

After retiring from playing, he became a special comments broadcaster, calling football alongside Dennis Cometti.

Castledine was also a horse trainer, owning and training Meliador, a great WA stayer who won the 1979 Perth Cup.
