= Tony Nesbit =

Australian rules footballer

Tony Nesbitt

Personal information
- Full name: Anthony David Nesbitt
- Born: 26 April 1938
- Died: 6 May 1996 (aged 58); North Yunderup, Western Australia
- Positions: Ruck rover, back pocket

Playing career^{1}
Years	Club	Games (Goals)
1958–1970	Swan Districts	233 (163)

Representative team honours
Years	Team	Games (Goals)
1963–1965	Western Australia	8 (0)

Coaching career
Years	Club	Games (W–L–D)
1968	Swan Districts	21 (1–20–0)
- ^{1} Playing statistics correct to the end of 1970.

Career highlights
- Premiership player 1961, 1962, 1963; Swan Medal 1964; Swan Districts Team of the Century

Anthony David "Tony" Nesbit (26 April 1938 – 6 May 1996) was an Australian rules footballer who was highly successful in the West Australian National Football League (WANFL) playing for the Swan Districts Football Club. Originally playing in the seconds for Swan Districts, his long career began at the club in 1954 along with Keith Slater.

A lightly built player he started on the wing but developed later into a ruck rover. In his debut season in the league competition, 1958, Nesbit won the "Rookie of the Year" award. After having been the chopping block of Western Australian football between 1946 and 1960, Swan Districts entered a period of unprecedented success during the early sixties, which Nesbit was a part of. Nesbit played in the back pocket of all three premiership sides, and was co-captain of Swan Districts in 1965 and 1966.

In 1968 Nesbitt was appointed as captain/coach of the side but Swan Districts’ 1968 season was so bad that the team won only one game after the siren against East Fremantle - the closest any senior WAFL team between 1918 and 1998 came to a winless season. As a result, Nesbit was replaced by Bill Walker. Nesbit retired in 1970 after playing 235 games for the club; he was made a life member. He was selected as a ruck rover in the Swan Districts Team of the Century.
