= Stan Nowotny =

Australian rules footballer

Personal information
- Full name: Stanley Robert Nowotny
- Born: 6 September 1950 (age 76); Western Australia

Playing career^{1}
Years	Club	Games (Goals)
1969–1983	Swan Districts	278 (100)
- ^{1} Playing statistics correct to the end of 1983.

Career highlights
- Premiership player (WAFL): 1982, 1983; Club captain: 1977–1981; Swan Medal: 1974; WA state team: 1974, 1975

Stanley Robert "Stan" Nowotny (born 6 September 1950) is a former Australian rules football player who played for the Swan Districts Football Club in the West Australian Football League (WAFL) from 1969 to 1983.

In his 278-game playing career with Swan Districts, Nowotny became a two-time premiership player (1982 and 1983), a Swan Medal winner, a state representative, and a captain. He was inducted into the West Australian Football Hall of Fame and the Swan Districts Football Club Hall of Fame.
