= Brent Hutton =

Australian rules footballer

Personal information
- Full name: Brent Hutton
- Born: 15 April 1964 (age 62)
- Original team: Bassendean
- Height: 185 cm (6 ft 1 in)
- Weight: 80 kg (176 lb)

Playing career^{1}
Years	Club	Games (Goals)
1982–1992	Swan Districts	151 (236)
1988–1989	West Coast Eagles	13 (9)
Total		164 (245)
- ^{1} Playing statistics correct to the end of 1992.

Brent Hutton (born 15 April 1964) is a former Australian rules footballer who played with the West Coast Eagles in the Victorian Football League (VFL) and Swan Districts in the West Australian Football League (WAFL).

A local from Bassendean, Hutton had his breakthrough season for Swan Districts in 1984 when he was used as a full-forward and kicked 83 goals to win the league's goal-kicking award. He kicked five goals in that year's grand final win over East Fremantle.

Hutton spent much of the 1985 season as a defender due to a loss of form but by 1987 was club captain. Also, in 1987, he kicked three goals for Western Australiain an interstate match against South Australia at the WACA.

Hutton was signed by West Coast in 1988 but was in and out of the side during his two-season stint, with 13 appearances. He continued playing at Swan Districts and was a member of another premiership side in 1990.
