= Bill Walker (Australian footballer, born 1942) =

Australian rules footballer, born 1941

Bill Walker AM

Personal information
- Full name: William Herbert John Walker
- Nickname: Butch
- Born: 23 February 1941 (age 85); Huntly, New Zealand
- Original team: Narembeen Football Club (EDFL)
- Position: Rover

Playing career^{1}
Years	Club	Games (Goals)
1961–76	Swan Districts	304 (460) (Note: These tallies refer to premiership matches (home-and-away and finals matches) only.)

Representative team honours
Years	Team	Games (Goals)
1962–73	Western Australia	21 (29)

Coaching career
Years	Club	Games (W–L–D)
1969–71	Swan Districts	63 (14–48–1)
- ^{1} Playing statistics correct to the end of 1976.

Career highlights
- Swan Districts leading goalkicker 1961; Swan Districts premiership side 1961, 1962, 1963; 4 x Sandover Medal: 1965, 1966, 1967, 1970; Swan Districts best and fairest 1965, 1966, 1968, 1969, 1970; Simpson Medal 1967 (interstate); Australian Football World Tour 1968; All-Australian team 1969; Swan Districts captain 1969–75; WAFL life member 1985; Australian Football Hall of Fame inductee 1996, legend 2026; West Australian Football Hall of Fame legend 2004

William Herbert John Walker AM (born 23 February 1941 in Huntly, New Zealand) is a former Australian rules footballer who represented Swan Districts in the West Australian National Football League (WANFL). He was the winner of the 1965, 1966, 1967 and 1970 Sandover Medals.

== Career ==
Born in Huntly, New Zealand, Walker grew up in the wheatbelt town of Narembeen. Despite his being regarded as perhaps the best country prospect in Western Australia in 1960, Walker’s father thought him too small to be successful at WANFL football. Despite this, once all eight WANFL clubs showed interest in him, his father suggested Walker – who barracked for West Perth as a boy – should sign with Swan Districts, who implemented a major recruiting program during the 1960–61 off-season after spending 15 years in the doldrums, alongside the signing of Haydn Bunton junior as captain-coach.

Playing in the grand final in his first season in 1961, Walker kicked 5.5, including the decisive goal, and went on to play in winning grand finals in the next two seasons. He is the only player to have won four Sandover Medals, though his 1970 medal, which had previously been lost on countback to Pat Dalton, was awarded retrospectively by Westar Rules in 1997. Walker had to be coaxed into playing again for each of three seasons after 1965, owing to his farm work and managing a Midland Junction hotel, but it was in this period that Walker reached his peak for a Swan Districts team that was struggling severely owing to the lack of ruckmen of even moderate ability.

Between 1969 and 1971, Walker captain-coached Swans with very little success, but his experience was valuable as the black and whites climbed the ladder under Jack Ensor in the following four seasons, during which their scarcity of ruckmen turned into a glut as future VFL players, such as Bob Beecroft and Garry Sidebottom, joined the club.

Walker served on Swan Districts’ Board of Directors from 1978 to 1983, and was appointed president of the club in 1983, a role in which he served until 1995. He was appointed a Member of the Order of Australia in 1978 and life membership of the WAFL in 1985. In 1996 Walker was an inaugural inductee into the Australian Football Hall of Fame and in 2004 he was awarded Legend Status in the West Australian Football Hall of Fame. He was elevated to Legend status in the Australian Football Hall of Fame in 2026.

His son, Greg Walker, played 139 games for Swan Districts, winning the 1990 Simpson Medal.
