= Duggan Anderson =

Australian rules footballer

Personal information
- Full name: Douglas David Anderson
- Born: 21 September 1924; Witchcliffe, Western Australia
- Died: 7 December 2012 (aged 88); Murdoch, Western Australia
- Original team: Swan Districts juniors
- Position: Centre half-back

Playing career^{1}
Years	Club	Games (Goals)
1945–1956	Swan Districts	210 (32)

Representative team honours
Years	Team	Games (Goals)
1946–1952	Western Australia	6 (0)
- ^{1} Playing statistics correct to the end of 1956.

Career highlights
- Swan Districts best and fairest 1948, 1950, 1952; Swan Districts captain 1951, 1952; Swan Districts life member 1955; Swan Districts Team of the Century (named 2000); West Australian Football Hall of Fame (inducted 2011)

Douglas David "Duggan" Anderson (21 September 1924 – 7 December 2012) was an Australian rules footballer who played for the Swan Districts Football Club in the Western Australian National Football League (WANFL), and later served in a variety of administrative roles at the club. He suffered a serious accident on his family's farm in January 1947 and lost all the fingers on his left hand. Anderson not only recovered to play football again but also played the first game of the 1947 season.

Duggan was a noted defender and mostly played a centre half back where he was a solid contributor. In the Swan Districts Team of the Century Anderson is listed on the interchange bench. After retiring as a player Anderson remained involved in the club serving as a club committee member and club president.

He was inducted into the West Australian Football Hall of Fame in 2011.
