= Bill Skwirowski =

Australian rules footballer

Personal information
- Full name: William Skwirowski
- Born: 20 February 1956 (age 70); Collie, Western Australia
- Height: 182 cm (6 ft 0 in)
- Weight: 74 kg (163 lb)

Playing career^{1}
Years	Club	Games (Goals)
1975–1988	Swan Districts	207 (31)
- ^{1} Playing statistics correct to the end of 1988.

William Skwirowski (born 20 February 1956) is a former Australian rules footballer who played with the Swan Districts in the Western Australian Football League during the 1970s and 1980s.

The son of Tadeusz and Zofia Skwirowski, he started his career at Swan Districts in 1975 after moving from Collie to play in the wing position. He later solidified his position in the team as a defender and was developed by coach John Todd as a tagger He played an important role in the success that Swan Districts experienced during the 1980s.

Skwirowski played in the back pocket for the losing premiership team of 1980 as well as each of the three premierships the Swan Districts won in 1982, 1983 and 1984. In 1985, Skwirowski represented Western Australia in the state team against South Australia.

Retiring in 1988, he played a total of 207 games and kicked 31 goals.

He is a life member of the Swan Districts Football Club.
