= Team of the Decade =

Team of the Decade may refer to:

- Wallaby Team of the Decade, from Australian Rugby for rugby union
- Adelaide Crows Team of the Decade, for the Australian Rules Football team
- ESPN World Team of the Decade

== See also ==
- Team of the century
- Team of the Year (disambiguation)
