= Jon Fogarty (footballer) =

Australian rules footballer

Personal information
- Full name: Jonathon Alfred Fogarty
- Born: 31 January 1960 (age 66)
- Original team: Mines Rovers (Collie)

Playing career^{1}
| Years | Club | Games (Goals) |
| 1979–1985 | Swan Districts | 133 (38) |
- ^{1} Playing statistics correct to the end of 1985.

Jonathon Alfred "Jon" Fogarty (born 31 January 1960) is a former Australian rules footballer who was highly successful in the West Australian Football League (WAFL), playing for the Swan Districts Football Club.

Initially, Swan Districts recruited Fogarty from the Collie team, Mines Rovers. As a midfielder, Fogarty played for the Swans from 1979 to 1985. In the seven seasons he played for, he notched up 133 games and kicked 38 goals.

Fogarty was an integral part of the midfield playing as a ruck rover in the victorious Grand Final sides of 1982, 1983 and 1984. He also represented Western Australia in 1984 and 1985 as a ruck rover.
