= Swan Districts Football Club =

Australian rules football club in Perth

Swan Districts

Names
- Full name: Swan Districts Football Club
- Former name: Swan Districts National Football Club (1932–80)
- Nickname(s): Swans, Swannies, Black Ducks, Black and Whites

2026 season
- Home-and-away season: 8th (WAFL); 1st (WAFLW)
- Leading goalkicker: Leigh Kohlmann (32 Goals)

Club details
- Founded: 1933; 93 years ago
- Colours: Black White
- Competition: West Australian Football League (men); WAFL Women's (women)
- Chairperson: Peter Hodyl
- Coach: Andrew Pruyn (WAFL)
- Captain: Jesse Turner (WAFL)
- Premierships: 8 (1961, 1962, 1963, 1982, 1983, 1984, 1990, 2010)
- Ground: Steel Blue Oval, Bassendean (capacity: 22,000)

Uniforms
Home

Other information
- Official website: swandistrictsfc.com.au

The Swan Districts Football Club, nicknamed the Swans, is an Australian rules football club playing in the West Australian Football League (WAFL) and WAFL Women's (WAFLW). The club is based at Bassendean Oval, in Bassendean, an eastern suburb of Perth, Western Australia. The club was formed in 1933, and joined the then-Western Australian National Football League (WANFL) in 1934, acting as a successor to Midland Junction Football Club, which had disbanded during World War I, in the Perth Hills region.

== History ==
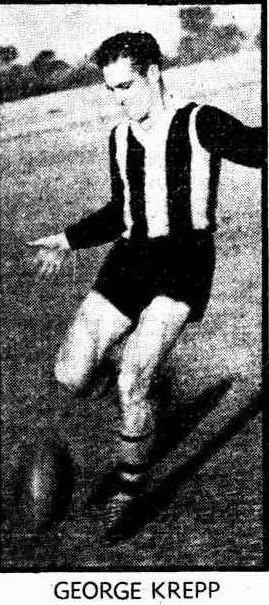
George Krepp in 1938

Swan Districts finished seventh on the WANFL ladder winning seven out of 21 games in their debut season in 1934. The presence of established WANFL players like inaugural captain-coach "Judda" Bee from East Fremantle and Fred Sweetapple from West Perth was critical to the fledgling club's competitiveness. In 1935, Swans finished sixth on the WANFL Ladder with six wins and twelve losses and George Krepp won the Sandover Medal. The 1936 season saw the Swans pick up nine wins and eleven losses but still finish seventh on the League Ladder.

The 1937 season saw Swan Districts, under new coach Jim Ditchburn, finish in third place on the League Ladder with 14 wins and 7 losses, and play in their first finals series. Ted Holdsworth kicked 109 goals in the first 14 games before injury ended his season and East Perth beat them in the first semi-final 13.9 (87) to 11.7 (73). Swan Districts had another good season in 1938, finishing third with 11 wins and nine losses but were again beaten in the first semi-final by East Perth 8.18 (66) – 9.11 (65).

In 1939, with the loss of champion spearhead Holdsworth to Kalgoorlie, Swans slid to sixth on the ladder with seven wins from twenty games. In the following two seasons, despite Holdsworth's return, the club slid still further to finish last with only two wins in 1940 and three in 1941. Due to the Second World War the WANFL suspended its senior competition and implemented an under age competition to replace it. In 1942 Swans were unable to raise a side to play and did not compete at all. By 1943 Swan Districts assembled a side to compete in the under-age competition and performed exceedingly well, finishing fourth on the ladder with nine wins and eight losses, then winning the first semi-final against West Perth and the preliminary Final against Subiaco. Swans thus played in their first Grand Final only to be defeated by East Fremantle, the final score being East Fremantle 17.15 (117) to Swan Districts 11.11 (77). Jim Davies became the second Swan Districts player to win a Sandover Medal in 1944 with 33 votes in what was otherwise a forgettable season with Swans finishing sixth on the ladder, but in the restored open-age competition of 1945 their fortunes improved as they finished fourth on the league ladder only to be defeated in the first semi-final by South Fremantle.

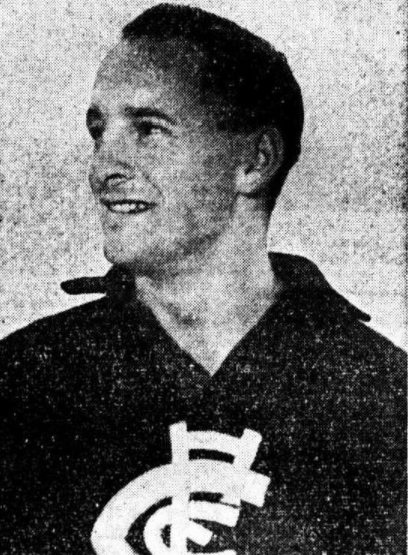
Jim Davies in 1951

However, Swan Districts fell off dramatically for the next fifteen seasons. During this period they never finished higher than sixth of eight teams, and overall won only sixty-one and drew one of their 301 matches, suffering from the fact that much of the area around Bassendean was "un-allotted" so that players such as Keith and Roy Harper, and Frank Coulson moved to more successful clubs. They were nonetheless instrumental in having the WANFL introduce its "Provident Fund" to allow league revenue to be shared amongst the clubs. In 1957 Swan Districts won their first Colts Premiership, repeating the dose in 1958, and these teams provided the nucleus of their successes in the early to middle 1960s.

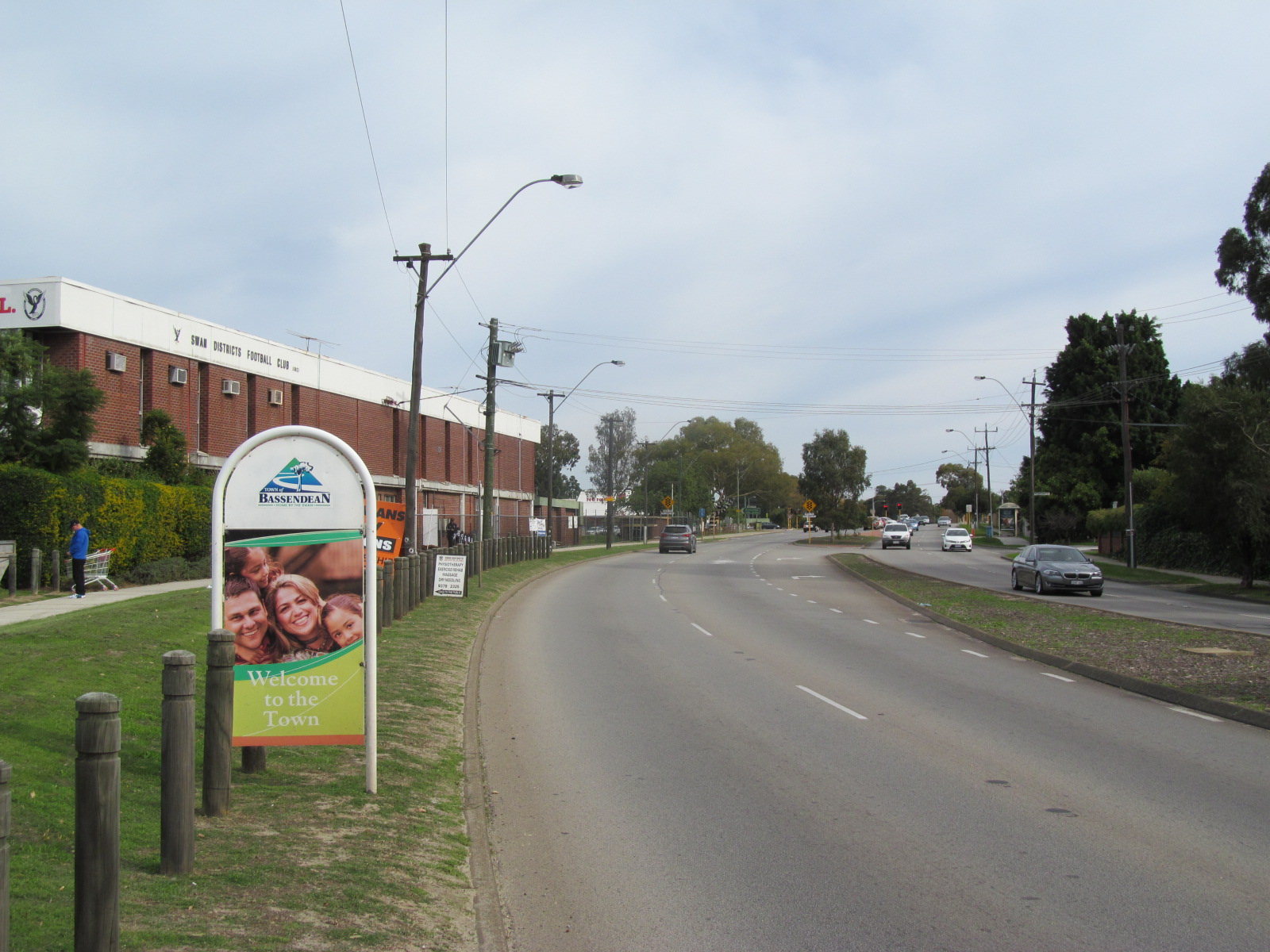
Swan Districts Football Club from Guildford Road

After finishing last in 1960, Swan Districts appointed Haydn Bunton junior as senior captain-coach in early 1961, and improvement was immediate. Swan Districts won twelve and drew two of their twenty-one regular season matches to be a clear second and an ingenious tactic by Bunton against champion East Perth ruckman "Polly" Farmer won them a huge upset in the Grand Final, and two more premierships followed in 1962 and 1963. Swans' fall afterwards was however just as rapid as their rise from 1960 to 1961. In 1964 Swans won seven of their first nine matches, but then state representative calls and form lapses affected the team so badly that they won only two of their final twelve encounters. After achieving their most successful home-and-away season under new captain coach Fred Castledine before being overwhelmed by a mediocre East Fremantle team in the 1965 Grand Final,^{[a]} they fell off completely in the following eight seasons. Swans in this era were hindered by the lack of a full-time coach or secretary that made it harder for them to recruit than other WANFL clubs. In 1968, Swan Districts came nearer to a winless season than any team in senior WA(N)FL competition between 1918 and 1998: winning only one game after the siren by a point against East Fremantle, and scored their all-time lowest score against East Perth. Swan Districts were also last in 1970 and 1971, and not until 1974 did they again make the finals, under the coaching of Jack Ensor, who most unusually never played senior League Football. Again, however, they declined abruptly, falling to wooden spooners in 1977 and 1978.

John Todd, who took the coaching reins at Bassendean in 1977 and began with a big clean-out of players, brought with him a new winning culture, one which would emulate that of the Haydn Bunton era. By the 1980s, Swans became the dominant side in the WAFL, winning three straight flags in 1982, 1983 and 1984. Swan Districts fell drastically to be last in 1986 and 1988, but rose equally rapidly and after a stint coaching the West Coast Eagles in 1988 and 1989, Todd returned to the club and after being fifth with ten wins in 1989 they won a seventh premiership, beating Claremont 16.7 (103) to 10.17 (77) in 1990. However, after several unsuccessful finals campaigns between 1991 and 1994 Todd returned to South Fremantle, where he began his football career, and Swan Districts fell rapidly downhill on and off the field under coaches Graham Melrose (1995 and 1996), Phil Cronan (1997 and 1998), Peter Wilson (1999) and Todd again from 2000 to 2002. Between 1995 and 2002 they did not play in the finals and overall won only 51 of 158 games.

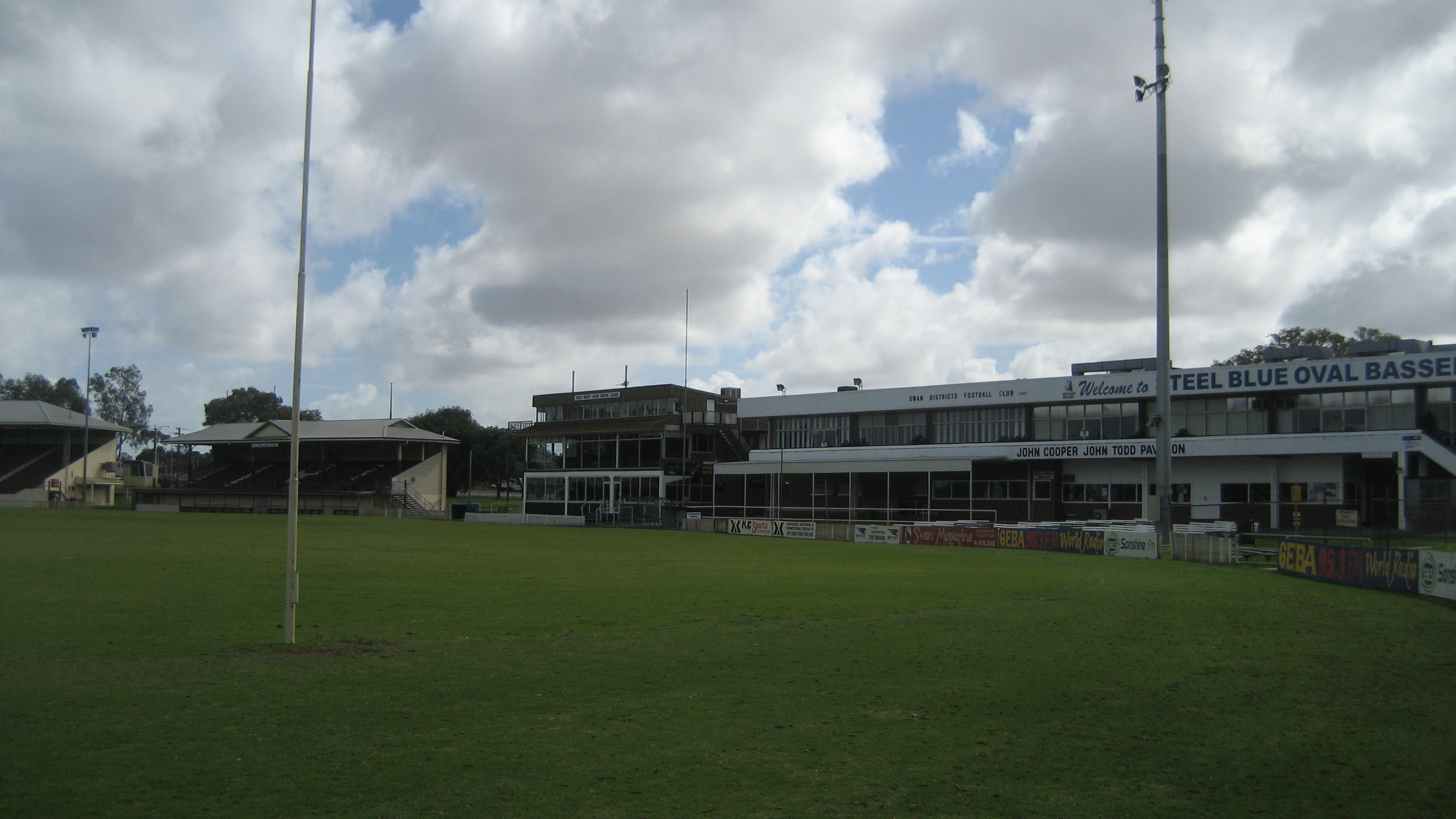
Steel Blue Oval grandstands, 2009

At the end of 2002, a season where Swans ran last in all three grades and were as lucky as in 1968 to escape a winless season in the seniors, the club's desperate financial trouble came to the public's attention and a concerted financial drive saw them rise to ten wins and a draw under new coach Steve Turner, and back into the finals in 2004 and 2005. They could not challenge Subiaco or South Fremantle for the flag, and in 2006 fell to only seven wins before Turner gave way to former Eagles star Chris Lewis early in 2007. Brian Dawson took over as coach of the seniors in 2008 and the club rebounded from disappointing results in the previous two years to play in the 2008 Grand Final which they lost to Subiaco. Dawson then steered the team to a preliminary final in 2009. Dawson announced his retirement at the end of the 2010 season. then took the team to the Grand Final which they won over Claremont by a single point. Andrew Krakouer won the Simpson Medal on top of winning the Sandover Medal for 2010, he accumulated 42 possessions during the grand final and kicked the last goal of the game ensuring Swan won the flag. Josh Roberts will be remembered as the premiership skipper in his first year as captain.

Greg Harding was appointed as senior coach for the 2011 season. The club had a poor season finishing the season with only six wins from twenty games and finishing second from bottom of the league ladder, but rebounded in 2012 to finish second to a powerful Claremont combination only to lose both finals.

In 2013 Swans finished 3rd on the ladder with Tim Geappen kicking 49 goals for the season and Tony Notte being awarded the fairest and best.

Swan Districts were a foundation member of the WAFL Women's competition in 2019.

== Club song ==
The Swan Districts club song is to the tune of the 1926 song Baby Face written by Harry Akst and Benny Davis.
The club song lyrics were written by John Watts and performed to the 1975 version of Baby Face.

Black and whites,
We're the black and whites

We're all right,
We are the mighty fighting black and whites
There's not another team to match our pace,
Take our place
The Swan boys are jumping
We sure have started something
Here we come
Our banners fly on high to show that we have won
We play with all our might
Because we're full of fight
We're the famous
Black and whites

Black and whites,
We're the black and whites

Black and whites,
We're the black and whites

Here we come
Our banners fly out high to show that we have won
We play with all our might
Because we're full of fight
We're the famous
Black and whites

We're all right,
We are the mighty fighting black and whites
There's not another team to match our pace,
Take our place
The Swan boys are jumping
We sure have started something
Here we come
Our banners fly on high to show that we have won
We play with all our might
Because we're full of fight
We're the famous
Black and whites

== Honours ==
=== Club honours ===
Premierships
Competition	Level	Wins	Years won
West Australian Football League	Men's Seniors	8	1961, 1962, 1963, 1982, 1983, 1984, 1990, 2010
West Australian Football League	Men's Reserves	6	1946, 1964, 1979, 2006, 2023, 2026
West Australian Football League	Colts (Boys U19)	7	1957, 1978, 1971, 1991, 2007, 2008, 2021
West Australian Football League	Rogers Cup (Girls U19)	2	2017, 2026
West Australian Football League	Fourths (1965–1974)	2	1969, 1971
Other titles and honours
Rodriguez Shield	Multiple	5	1962, 1965, 1974, 1975, 1980
Finishing positions
West Australian Football League	Minor premiership (men's seniors)	4	1962, 1965, 1980, 1984
West Australian Football League	Runners-up (men's seniors)	4	1943, 1965, 1980, 2008
West Australian Football League	Wooden spoons (men's seniors)	21	1940, 1941, 1948, 1951, 1952, 1956, 1957, 1959, 1960, 1968, 1970, 1971, 1977, 1978, 1986, 1988, 1995, 2001, 2002, 2016, 2019
West Australian Football League	Minor premiership (women's seniors)	2	2021, 2026
West Australian Football League	Runners-up (women's seniors)	4	2019, 2021, 2025, 2026

=== Individual honours ===
Sandover Medallists: George Krepp 1935, Jim Davies 1944, Haydn Bunton Junior 1962, Bill Walker 1965–1967 & 1970, Phil Narkle 1982, Mick Grasso 1990, Jeremy Wasley 1996, Shane Beros 2003, Andrew Krakouer 2010, Samuel Fisher 2020, Nik Rokahr 2024.

Most Games: Tony Notte 323

Record Home Attendance: 22,350 v West Perth, 19 May 1980

== League premiership teams ==
1961 Finals Swan Districts lost the second semi final to East Perth, then beat Subiaco in the Preliminary Final to win through to the Grand Final

1961 Grand Final Swan Districts 17.9 (111) defeated East Perth 12.15 (87)

1961 premiership team

Backs:	C Maynard	Joe Lawson	Tony Nesbit
Half Backs:	W Brown	Ken Bagley	D Thompson
Centres:	B Gray	M Kelleher	J Mack
Half Forwards:	M Ashworth	John Turnbull	K Watt
Forwards:	Cyril Litterick	Lindsay Johnston	Bill Walker
Ruck:	Keith Slater	Fred Castledine	Haydn Bunton, Jr
Interchange:	C Noble	A Sangalli
Coach:	Haydn Bunton, Jr

1962 Finals Swan Districts defeat East Fremantle in the second semi final.

1962 Grand Final Swan Districts 14.10 (94) defeated East Fremantle 10.16 (76)

1962 premiership team

Backs:	K Cooper	Joe Lawson	Tony Nesbit
Half Backs:	W Brown	Ken Bagley	G Devitt
Centres:	B Gray	C Maynard	F Copeman
Half Forwards:	C Noble	John Turnbull	K Watt
Forwards:	Cyril Litterick	Eric Gorman	Bill Walker
Ruck:	Keith Slater	Fred Castledine	Haydn Bunton, Jr
Interchange:	H Fullgrabe	M Drennan
Coach:	Haydn Bunton, Jr

1963 Finals Swan Districts defeat East Perth in the first semi final, then Swan Districts defeat Perth in the Preliminary Final

1963 Grand Final Swan Districts 17.10 (112) defeated East Fremantle 13.12 (90)

1963 premiership team

Backs:	K Cooper	Joe Lawson	Tony Nesbit
Half Backs:	C Maynard	Fred Castledine	G Devitt
Centres:	B Gray	John Turnbull	D Sidebottom
Half Forwards:	C Noble	Ken Bagley	K Watt
Forwards:	Cyril Litterick	Eric Gorman	Bill Walker
Ruck:	Keith Slater	F Copeman	Haydn Bunton, Jr
Interchange:	R McVee	P Downey
Coach:	Haydn Bunton, Jr

1982 Finals Swan Districts defeat Claremont in the second semi final

1982 Grand Final Swan Districts 18.19 (127) defeated Claremont 11.12 (78)

1982 premiership team

Backs:	Peter Kenny	Tom Mullooly	Bill Skwirowski
Half Backs:	Graham Melrose	Alan Cransberg	Anthony Solin
Centres:	Phil Narkle	Leon Baker	Jeff Davidson
Half Forwards:	Brad Shine	Murray Rance	Keith Narkle
Forwards:	Allan Sidebottom	Stan Nowotny	Don Holmes
Ruck:	Ron Boucher	Jon Fogarty	Mike Richardson
Interchange:	Don Langsford	Ross Fitzgerald
Coach:	John Todd

1983 Finals Swan Districts defeat East Fremantle in the first semi final, then Swan Districts defeat South Fremantle in Preliminary Final

1983 Grand Final Swan Districts 15.14 (104) defeated Claremont 12.11 (83)

1983 premiership team

Backs:	Bill Skwirowski	Anthony Solin	Peter Ware
Half Backs:	Don Langsford	Murray Rance	Leigh Brenton
Centres:	Keith Narkle	Mike Smith	Phil Narkle
Half Forwards:	Gerard Neesham	Peter Kenny	Don Holmes
Forwards:	Barry Kimberley	Leon Baker	Ron Boucher
Ruck:	Peter Sartori	Jon Fogarty	Brad Shine
Interchange:	Alan Cransberg	Stan Nowotny
Coach:	John Todd

1984 Finals East Fremantle defeat Swan Districts in the second semi final, then Swan Districts defeat Claremont in Preliminary Final

1984 Grand Final Swan Districts 20.18 (138) defeated East Fremantle 15.12 (102)

1984 premiership team

Backs:	Bill Skwirowski	Tom Mullooly	Gavin Outridge
Half Backs:	Don Langsford	Murray Rance	Anthony Solin
Centres:	Shane Renfree	Stephen Richardson	Keith Narkle
Half Forwards:	Don Holmes	Peter Sartori	Brad Shine
Forwards:	Joe Ahmat	Brent Hutton	Ken Marshall
Ruck:	Michael Johns	Jon Fogarty	Barry Kimberley
Interchange:	Kevin Caton	Gerard Neesham
Coach:	John Todd

1990 Finals Claremont defeat Swan Districts in the second semi final, then Swan Districts defeat South Fremantle in Preliminary Final

1990 Grand Final Swan Districts 16.7 (103) defeated Claremont 10.17 (77)

1990 premiership team

Backs:	Kim Hetherington	Steve Eaton	Brendan Retzlaff
Half Backs:	Danny Penny	Paul Gow	Mick Grasso
Centres:	Geoff Passeri	Len Gandini	Andrew Holmes
Half Forwards:	David Ogg	Shaun Davey	Phil Narkle
Forwards:	Todd Menegola	Shane Strempel	Peter Hodyl
Ruck:	Ken Bell	Don Langsford	Don Holmes
Interchange:	Greg Walker	Brent Hutton
Coach:	John Todd

2010 Finals Claremont defeat Swan Districts in the second semi final, then Swan Districts defeat East Perth in Preliminary Final

2010 Grand Final Swan Districts 14.16 (100) defeated Claremont 14.15 (99)

2010 premiership team

Backs:	Graham Jetta	Tallan Ames	Matt Riggio
Half Backs:	Wayde Twomey	Matthew Spencer	Clancee Pearce
Centres:	Tom Roach	Josh Roberts	Brett Wolfenden
Half Forwards:	Justin Simpson	Tim Geappen	Paul Richardson
Forwards:	Andrew J. Krakouer	Ashley Hansen	Ben Colreavy
Ruck:	Llane Spaanderman	Brett Robinson	Travis Casserly
Interchange:	Ryan Davis	Stephen Coniglio	Tony Notte	Michael Walters
Coach:	Brian Dawson

== Hall of Fame ==
The Swan Districts Football Club Hall of Fame was established in 2016 to "recognise and enshrine players, coaches, administrators, volunteers and iconic moments that have made a most significant contribution to the Swan Districts Football Club ... since its inception in 1934." In the initial terms of reference document, there were to be four main categories for entries into the Hall of Fame:

1. Hall of Fame inductees (open to all players, coaches, administrators and volunteers);
2. Champion inductees (open to those SDFC players who have been recruited from SDFC into the AFL);
3. Legends – open to all Hall of Fame members; and
4. Iconic Moments, which were defined as "events which have been game changers for the Club. These could include football games, football events, infrastructure changes and innovations".

However, subsequent coverage of the club's Hall of Fame barely references these categories, and the reference to the Legends category was modified to "Immortals". The inaugural in take of the Swan Districts Hall of Fame included 26 individuals and one iconic moment. There were further induction ceremonies held in 2019 and 2021.

- Players with names in **bold** are also in the Western Australian Football Hall of Fame
- Players with an asterisk* next to their names are also in the Australian Football Hall of Fame

Swan Districts Football Club Hall of Fame
Name	Inducted	Career span	SDFC games (goals)	Description
**Immortals**
**Bill Walker** *	2016	1961–1976	305 (461)	Upgraded to Immortal status in 2019, Walker is the only WAFL player to have won the Sandover Medal four times. Possessing unparalleled ball sense and excellent disposal skills, he kicked five goals in Swans' breakthrough premiership in 1961, and formed a famous roving combination with Haydn Bunton Jr. His five Swan Medals are matched only by Travis Edmonds. Continued serving the club in various administration roles after his playing days.
**John Cooper**	2016	1951–1958	122 (4)	Upgraded to Immortal status in 2020, Cooper first arrived at Bassendean Oval from Manjimup in 1951 and gave great service mainly in defence over eight seasons. After returning to Swans following a spell of work in Boulder, he began an administrative career at Swans and the WAFL that has lasted over four decades.
**Other Hall of Fame Members**
**Duggan Anderson**	2016	1945–1956	210 (32)	Tall and strongly-built with an excellent high mark and a long driving kick, Anderson was an intelligent player who read the play superbly and was ideally suited to the key centre half-back position. After losing all four fingers from his left hand in a sawmill accident in 1947 he managed to modify his playing style and become the first Swans player to reach 200 games.
Ken Bagley	2016			
Tim Barker	2016			
Bob Beecroft	2021	1970–1975	126 (164)	Recruited from Upper Great Southern Football League club Williams as an 18-year-old, Beecroft became a football hero in three different states over a 16-year senior League career that included over 300 games and 600 goals. Played mainly as a ruckman with Swans, winning the Swan Medal and All-Australian selection in 1972. In 1976 he went to Fitzroy in the VFL and became a key forward, kicking a then club record of 87 goals in 1979, before finishing his career with Woodville in the SANFL.
Shane Beros	2019			
Ron Boucher	2016			
Percy Bright	2019			
Bob Bryant	2016	1934–1978	N/A	Originally from Ballarat (Victoria), Bryant served in Gallipoli during World War I before moving to Western Australia. He was a founding member of Swans in 1934 and served the club in a variety of roles including head trainer, organising secretary of the juniors, timekeeper, social club treasurer, assistant secretary and property steward. Recognised for his service in 1970 with the National Football League Certificate of Merit.
**Haydn Bunton Jr.** *	2016	1961–1964	89 (112)	The son of a legend, Bunton Jr. carved out his own legacy, overcoming a serious childhood disease and knee injury suffered in a car accident in 1959 to win the 1962 Sandover Medal and captain-coach Swans to their first three premierships. In his four seasons with the Black Ducks, he won three Swan Medals and represented Western Australia 11 times. One of the most influential on-field figures in the club's history with his innovative coaching and determined attitude.
Fred Castledine	2016			
Joel Cornelius	2021	1995–2006	221 (67)	When Cornelius returned to senior level football for Swans after being dropped to the reserves following his first two senior games in 1995, he would go on to set a new League record for consecutive games played (219 games), eventually finishing with 221 games during a somewhat success-starved period in Swans history. A competitive player who was used mainly in defence and midfield, Cornelius served as club captain from 2002 to 2005.
Travis Edmonds	2016			
Ted Holdsworth	2016			
Don Holmes	2016			
Ron Jose	2016			
George Krepp	2019			
Don Langsford	2016			
Joe Lawson	2016			
Peter Manning	2019			
Colin Maynard	2021			
Tom Moiler	2016			
Stan Moses	2016			
Lal Mosey	2016			
Tom Mullooly	2019			
Jack Murray	2016	1935–40, 1945–49	170 (37)	In a war-interrupted career, Murray established a reputation as one of the hardest and toughest players of his era, earning the nickname "Granite". Although he played mainly as a defender, he was also a handy ruckman. He represented Western Australia in interstate football nine times, and is best remembered for his physical clashes with Richmond/Victorian icon Jack Dyer.
Keith Narkle	2016			
Phil Narkle	2019			
Tony Nesbit	2016			
**Stan Nowotny**	2016	1969–1983	278 (100)	A rugged, no-nonsense player who possessed a somewhat awkward kicking style, Nowotny played much of his career on the half-back flank before making a successful transition to the ruck-rover role and then finishing as a key forward. Nowotny served as a much-respected club captain from 1977 to 1981, and fittingly finished his career as a dual premiership player.
Joe Pearce	2016			
Dave Sidebottom	2021	1961–1969	129 (38)	Of the six Sidebottoms to have represented Swans over the years, Dave played the most games. His finest hour came in the 1963 grand final, starring on a wing in the 22-point premiership win against East Fremantle. Later served the club as Colts and Reserves coach, then as a Board Director and Chairman of Selectors.
Garry Sidebottom	2016			
Sydney Sinclair	2021			
Keith Slater	2016			
**John Todd** *	2016	1977–87, 1990–94, 2000–02	N/A	A star at South Fremantle who won the Sandover at 17 before a serious knee injury brought his playing career to a premature end, Todd became the longest-serving and most successful coach at Swans; across three separate stints starting in 1977 and ending in 2002, he coached 417 games and won four premierships. Known for his uncompromising, fire-and-brimstone approach, Todd's riskiest gamble was to drop Stan Nowotny for the 1983 Preliminary final.
John Turnbull	2021	1960–1971	206 (129)	Strong at the ball and physical around the contest, Turnbull could be called on to play in almost position on the field, and have an impact. He is one of a handful of players to be part of all three of the Swans' premiership teams from 1961 to 1963. He also represented Western Australia ten times in interstate football.
**Iconic Moments**
The first premiership	2016	1961	N/A	After finishing wooden spooners in 1960, the Swans committee surprised the football world by securing the services of Haydn Bunton Jr. as captain-coach and recruit the then 19-year-old Bill Walker, who had been a target of interest from all WANFL clubs. Under Bunton's leadership, the Swans would become the first team in the WAFL to go from wooden spooners to League champions the following season, eventually going on to win their first hat-trick of premierships.

== List of Swan Districts footballers who have played in the VFL/AFL ==
For many years, Swan Districts has provided many footballers who have excelled at VFL/AFL level, with a notable number who are of Indigenous Australian heritage. This list only counts footballers who played at least game at senior VFL/AFL level and who were recruited / drafted from Swan Districts.

Swan Districts footballers at VFL/AFL clubs except West Coast & Fremantle
Club	Player(s)	Time at club	Games (Goals)	Notable achievements
Adelaide	Charlie Cameron	2014–2017	73 (87)	
Brisbane Bears/Brisbane Lions	Mike Richardson; Charlie Cameron; Todd Banfield	1987–1990; 2018–current 2009-2013	81 (43); 72 (140); 53 (57)	
Carlton	Peter Sartori; Brett Johnson; Luke Blackwell; Jeff Garlett; Chris Yarran	2004–2005; 2006–2007; 2009–2014; 2009–2015	32 (9); 23 (4); 107 (183); 119 (90)	
Collingwood	Mike Richardson; Scott Cummings	1983–1986; 2002	60 (117); 5 (6)	
Essendon	Leon Baker; Mike Richardson; Scott Cummings; Tom Edwards	1984–1988; 1986; 1994–1996	86 (70); 15 (14); 40 (83)	2× VFL Premiership 1984, 1985
Fitzroy	Bob Beecroft; Garry Sidebottom; Peter Sartori	1976–1980; 1982–1984	96 (291); 43 (53)	
Footscray/Western Bulldogs	Simon Beasley; Murray Rance; Riley Garcia	1982–1989; 1986–1987; 2021–current	154 (575); 40 (5); 5 (2)	Coleman Medal 1985
Geelong	Steven Handley; Lawson Humphries	1992–1997	73 (28)	
Gold Coast				
Greater Western Sydney	Stephen Coniglio; Rory Lobb; Darcy Jones; Sam Taylor	2012–current 2014–2018	153 (84); 74 (64)	
Hawthorn	Brett Johnson	2000–2003	38 (10)	
North Melbourne	Craig Holden	1982–1983	29 (2)	
Port Adelaide	Scott Cummings	1997–1998	37 (102)	
Richmond	Todd Menegola; Alex Rance; Nathan Broad	1991–1993; 2008–2019; 2016—Present	19 (13); 200 (9); 86 (1)	AFL Premiership 2017, 5× All-Australian (2014, 2015, 2016, 2017, 2018); 3× AFL Premiership (2017, 2019, 2020)
South Melbourne/Sydney	Craig Holden; Jason Ball; Lewis Jetta	1984–1988; 2000–2005; 2010–2015	80 (22); 90 (45); 127 (99)	All-Australian 1987; AFL Premiership 2005; AFL Premiership 2012
St Kilda	Phil Narkle	1984–1986	48 (37)	

=== West Coast representatives ===
- Don Holmes, 1987–1989: 23 games, 40 goals
- Phil Narkle, 1987, 1990: 18 games, 18 goals
- Murray Rance, 1988–1990: 57 games, 7 goals, club captain 1989
- Troy Ugle, 1988–1993: 43 games, 43 goals
- Jason Ball, 1992–1999: 103 games, 114 goals, AFL Premiership 1994
- Scott Cummings, 1999–2001: 46 games, 158 goals, Coleman Medal 1999
- Andrew Embley, 1999–2013: 250 games, 216 goals, AFL Premiership 2006, Norm Smith Medal 2006
- Adam Hunter, 2000–2009: 151 games, 86 goals, AFL Premiership 2006
- Ashley Hansen, 2004–2010: 78 games, 95 goals, AFL Premiership 2006
- Nic Naitanui, 2009–2023: 213 games, 112 goals, 3× All-Australian (2012, 2020, 2021)
- Lewis Jetta, 2016–2020: 75 games, 17 goals, AFL Premiership 2018

=== Fremantle representatives ===
- Travis Edmonds, 1995: 1 game, 0 goals
- Stephen O'Reilly, 1995-1998: 98 games, 15 goals
- Craig Callaghan, 1995-2000: 95 games, 69 goals
- Brendon Retzlaff, 1995: 6 games, 2 goals
- Michael Brown, 1996-1998: 22 games, 15 goals
- Michael Clark, 1996-1998: 1 game, 0 goals
- Garth Taylor, 1999-2000: 15 games, 12 goals
- Michael Walters, 2009-2025: 239 games, 365 goals, All-Australian
- Clancee Pearce, 2009-2016: 100 games, 36 goals
- Luke Pratt, 2009: 1 game, 0 goals
- Connor Blakely, 2015-2022: 78 games, 3 goals
- Griffin Logue, 2017-2022: 64 games, 9 goals
- Tobe Watson, 2019-2021: 14 games, 1 goal
- Rory Lobb, 2019-2022: 66 games, 79 goals
- Ethan Hughes, 2015-2024: 107 games, 6 goals

== Club record goal kickers ==
- Eric Gorman – 555
- Ted Holdsworth – 532
- Bill Walker – 456
- Tim Geappen – 371
- Don Holmes – 323
- Troy Ugle – 312
- Simon Beasley – 293
- Andy Holmes – 277
- Kevin Caton – 274
- Mark Olsen – 268
- Brent Hutton – 256

Ted Holdsworth was the first Swan Districts player to kick more than 100 goals. The most goals ever kicked in a season by a Swan Districts player was by Simon Beasley in 1981 when he kicked 119 goals, although Warren Ralph kicked 120 goals for Claremont and won the Bernie Naylor Medal.

== Bernie Naylor Medallists ==
The Bernie Naylor Medal is awarded to the leading goal kicker in the WAFL. Max George was the first Swan Districts player to top the WAFL goal kickers list and win the award when he kicked 90 goals during the 1974 season. Simon Beasley shared the Bernie Naylor Medal in 1980 with Warren Ralph of Claremont (97 goals) Brent Hutton won the award in 1984 (83 goals) and Kevin Caton won it again in 1992 (51 goals).

== Swan Medallists ==
The Swan Medal is awarded to the best and fairest player at Swan Districts. Multiple award winners include:

- 5-time winners
- Bill Walker: 1965, 1966, 1968, 1969 and 1970
- Travis Edmonds: 1992, 1993, 1997, 2000 and 2001
- 3-time winners
- George Krepp: 1934, 1935 and 1936
- Douglas Anderson: 1946,1948 and 1951
- Keith Slater: 1956, 1957 and 1960
- Haydn Bunton Jr.:1961, 1962 and 1963
- Peter Manning: 1967, 1971 and 1973
- Keith Narkle: 1977, 1978 and 1984
- Jesse Turner: 2022, 2023 and 2025
- 2-time winners
- Sydney Sinclair: 1938 and 1945
- Joseph Pearce: 1949 and 1950
- Garry Sidebottom: 1976 and 1975
- Gerard Neesham: 1979 and 1980
- Phillip Narkle: 1981 and 1988
- Joel Cornelius: 1998 and 1999
- Shane Beros: 2003 and 2005
- Adam Lange: 2004 and 2006
- Josh Roberts: 2008 and 2009
- Matt Riggio: 2015 and 2016
- Tony Notte: 2013 and 2018

== See also ==
- Wikipedia listing of Swan Districts Football Club players

== Notes ==
^{a} The ten losses East Fremantle suffered is, equal with East Perth in 1936, SANFL club Glenelg in 1986 and Adelaide in the 1998 AFL season, the most by an eventual premier in a major Australian Rules competition.
