= Joe Lawson (footballer) =

Australian rules footballer (1934–2020)

Personal information
- Born: 3 June 1934
- Died: 13 September 2020 (aged 86)

Playing career^{1}
Years	Club	Games (Goals)
1955–1966	Swan Districts	235(36)
- ^{1} Playing statistics correct to the end of 1966.

Career highlights
- Premiership player 1961,1962,1963; Club co-captain 1959; WA state team 1959; Swan Medal 1958

Joseph James Lawson (born 3 June 1934 – 13 September 2020) is a former Australian rules footballer who was highly successful in the West Australian National Football League (WANFL) playing for the Swan Districts Football Club.

A valiant defender, Lawson routinely played in the back line and was one the best full back that played for Swan Districts. Lawson won the fairest and best award at the Swans in 1958 and also played as a reserve in the 1959 WA state team when Western Australia were defeated by Victoria.

He played at full back the victorious Swan Districts premiership side of 1961, 1962 and 1963 and was amongst the best players on ground. Lawson is a life member at Swan Districts and is listed at full back in their Team of the Century.
