= Peter Manning (footballer) =

Australian rules footballer

Personal information
- Born: 17 May 1946 (age 80); Western Australia
- Height: 178 cm (5 ft 10 in)
- Weight: 76 kg (168 lb)

Playing career^{1}
Years	Club	Games (Goals)
1964–1975	Swan Districts (WANFL)	201
- ^{1} Playing statistics correct to the end of 1975.

Career highlights
- WA State Team 1965, 1968, 1969, 1970, 1974.; Swan Medal 1967, 1971, 1973

Peter John Manning (born 17 May 1946) is a former Australian rules footballer who was highly successful in the West Australian National Football League (WANFL) playing for the Swan Districts Football Club. Beginning his career in 1944, he was unlucky in missing the dominant period of Swan Districts but did play in the 1965 Grand Final that the Swans lost to East Fremantle. A skillful and hard running wingman or centreman, Manning played the majority of his career in these positions. Manning is a life member at Swan Districts and is listed on a half forward flank in their Team of the Century.
