= Don Holmes =

Australian rules footballer

Personal information
- Full name: Donald Shane Holmes
- Born: 5 January 1959 (age 67)
- Original team: Bassendean

Playing career^{1}
Years	Club	Games (Goals)
1978–1990	Swan Districts	158 (323)
1987–1989	West Coast	23 (40)
Total		181(373)

Representative team honours
Years	Team	Games (Goals)
1984	Western Australia	1 (0)
- ^{1} Playing statistics correct to the end of 1990.

Career highlights
- 4× WAFL Premiership player: (1982, 1983, 1984, 1990); Swan Districts Team of the Century 1934–2000; Swan Districts Hall of Fame, inducted 2016

Donald Shane Holmes (born 5 January 1959) is a former Australian rules footballer who was played in the West Australian Football League (WAFL) for Swan Districts and in the Victorian Football League (VFL) for West Coast.

== Playing career ==
A local boy from Bassendean Holmes made his debut in 1978 at nineteen years of age. He represented Swan Districts in four WAFL Grand Final sides playing in the forward line either as a forward pocket or a half forward flank. Holmes kicked two goals in the 1982 and 1983 grand final and five goals in the 1984 grand final. He was also selected in the 1984 WA State team.

In 1987 Holmes was recruited by the West Coast Eagles and was part of their inaugural team and played for them for three seasons playing 23 games and kicking 40 goals.

Holmes played his final season in 1990 and was part of the victorious Swan Districts side. He played a total of 181 senior games and kicked a total of 363 goals.

He is listed in the Swan Districts Team of the Century as an interchange player. Coach John Todd rated Holmes and his mate Don Langsford as having achieved more than anyone else at Swan Districts in that they played in four winning premiership teams.
