= Phil Narkle =

Australian rules footballer

Personal information
- Full name: Phillip Michael Narkle
- Born: 29 January 1961 (age 65); Boddington, Western Australia
- Height: 178 cm (5 ft 10 in)
- Weight: 72 kg (159 lb)
- Position: Wing

Playing career
Years	Club	Games (Goals)
1978–83, 1988–93	Swan Districts	178 (178)
1984–86	St Kilda	48 (37)
1987, 90	West Coast	18 (18)
Total		244 (235)

Representative team honours
Years	Team	Games (Goals)
1980–1987	Western Australia	5 (3)

Career highlights
- West Australian Football Hall of Fame - 2006; All Australian - 1987; WAFL Premiership Player - 1982, 1983, 1990; Indigenous Team of the Century squad member - 2005; Sandover Medal - 1982; Swan Medal - 1981, 1991

Phillip Michael Narkle (born 29 January 1961) is a former Australian rules football player of Indigenous Australian descent who played for St Kilda and West Coast in the Australian Football League (AFL) and Swan Districts Football Club in the West Australian Football League (WAFL) during the mid-late 1970s and early 1990s. Younger brother of Keith Narkle (by nine years) who also played for Swan Districts, Phil generally played on the wing position. Regarded as a highly skilled and determined footballer with tremendous pace, Phil was perfectly suited to the wing position where he could turn defence into attack.

== Playing career ==
Phil Narkle played colts in 1977 for Swan Districts in the WANFL and was awarded the Medallists Medal for being the fairest and best player for that year. He made his debut for Swan Districts in the league competition during 1978 and gradually established himself for a club that was emerging from a lean period since Haydn Bunton junior had left fifteen years beforehand.

Narkle had a sensational season in 1982 when he played in the WAFL premiership for Swan Districts, and during that year he also won the Sandover Medal for the best player in the WAFL. Narkle played one more year for Swan Districts playing in his second premiership for the club. The Grand Final was Narkle's last game for Swans before moving onto St Kilda in the then-VFL. He was seen as an acquisition for the struggling Saints but a succession of injuries meant Narkle did not show anything of his best form at Moorabbin until the latter part of the 1986 season.

In 1987 Narkle returned to Western Australia to play for the West Coast Eagles where he became the club's inaugural selection to the All Australian Team. However, an ankle injury before the 1988 season meant Narkle did not play more than three games in the WAFL all season and at the end of that season a more serious knee problem caused Narkle to walk with a permanent limp and West Coast de-listed him Even when Narkle did return to Swan Districts late in 1989 he had played several reserves matches and moved to the back pocket to avoid the exertion of playing in his familiar wing role.

Narkle was re-drafted by the Eagles in 1990 and played nine senior games for the club, but was in and out of the rechristened WASFL and his experience was a vital component in Swans’ grand final win over Claremont. Playing more often in defence, Narkle took over as Swan captain for 1992 and continued to play well despite having lost some of his earlier explosive speed. At the age of thirty-two, Narkle retired as a player at the end of 1993, but has continued to give service in administration.
