= Team of the Year =

Team of the Year may refer to:

- BBC Sports Personality of the Year Team Award
- Canadian Press Team of the Year Award
- GPA Gaelic Team of the Year
- IRB International Sevens Team of the Year
- IRB International Team of the Year
- J.League Team of the Year
- Laureus World Sports Award for Team of the Year
- PFA Team of the Year
- PFA Scotland Team of the Year
- PWI Tag Team of the Year
- UEFA Team of the Year
- USOC Team of the Year
- World Rugby Team of the Year

== See also ==
- Team of the Decade (disambiguation)
- Team of the century
