= Peter Johnston (footballer, born 1957) =

Australian rules footballer

Personal information
- Full name: Peter Andrew Johnston
- Born: 13 November 1957 (age 68)
- Original team: St Virgil's College
- Height: 192 cm (6 ft 4 in)
- Weight: 95 kg (209 lb)
- Position: Forward

Playing career^{1}
Years	Club	Games (Goals)
1976–1978	Melbourne	30 (36)
1979–1986	Geelong	92 (108)
Total		122 (144)
- ^{1} Playing statistics correct to the end of 1986.

Peter Andrew Johnston (born 13 November 1957) is a former Australian rules footballer who played with Melbourne and Geelong in the Victorian Football League (VFL).

== Melbourne ==
A Tasmanian, Johnston played for St Virgil's College and Tasmanian Football League (TFL) club North Hobart before his recruitment by Melbourne. A forward, he spent three seasons at Melbourne and although he did not kick a goal in his last five games of the 1978 VFL season, his 31 goals for the year was just two short of winning the club's leading goal-kicker award.

== Geelong ==
He switched allegiances to Geelong for the 1979 season and performed credibly, although he became known for his inaccuracy in front of goal. Johnston had the misfortune of playing in successive preliminary final losses in 1980 and 1981.

Johnston is perhaps best remembered for his role in the 1981 Preliminary Final, against Collingwood, due to the circumstances surrounding his late inclusion. As a result of a communication breakdown, former St Kilda player Garry Sidebottom was not informed of his recall into the preliminary final team and was asleep at his home in Lara as the team bus passed through. Johnston had initially been named as an emergency and travelled to VFL Park by car with two other players. On the way he smoked "half a pack of Winnie Blues" and ate "half a chicken, large chips and a thick shake" for lunch. When he arrived at the ground he was informed by the team manager that Sidebottom had missed the bus and he was to take his spot in the team. Johnston would only play 20 minutes and failed to have a possession.
