= Ted Holdsworth =

Australian rules footballer and coach

Personal information
- Full name: Henry Edwin Arthur Holdsworth
- Born: 26 January 1917
- Died: 23 September 1984 (aged 67)
- Positions: Full forward, full-back

Playing career^{1}
Years	Club	Games (Goals)
1935–38, 1940–41, 1945–47	Swan Districts	143 (532)
1939	Kalgoorlie City	

Representative team honours^{2}
Years	Team	Games (Goals)
1945–46	Western Australia	2

Coaching career^{3}
Years	Club	Games (W–L–D)
1939	Kalgoorlie City	
1952	Swan Districts	20 (2–18–0)
- ^{1} Playing statistics correct to the end of 1947.^{2} Representative statistics correct as of 1946.^{3} Coaching statistics correct as of 1952.

Henry Edwin Arthur Holdsworth (26 January 1917 – 23 September 1984) was an Australian rules footballer who was highly successful in the West Australian National Football League (WANFL) playing for the Swan Districts Football Club.

A full forward who was laudeed with a strong overhead mark and accurate kick Holdsworth topped the top goal kicker list at Swan Districts during his career. In 1937 and 1938 he kicked 109 and 116 goals respectively yet never topped the WANFL goal kickers list.

Holdsworth played twice for Western Australia, once at full forward and in the 1946 side that played South Australia Holdsworth played at fullback as he was also regarded as a fine backman.

Retiring as a player in 1947, Holdsworth had played 143 games for the club and booted 532 goals the second-most of any Swans player after Eric Gorman. He went on to coach Swan Districts in 1952 and later became vice president of the club. He is named in the Swan Districts Team of the Century at full forward. His grandson, Ryan Turnbull, later played senior football for Claremont, East Perth, and the West Coast Eagles.
