= Eric Gorman =

Australian rules footballer

Personal information
- Full name: Eric Desmond Gorman
- Born: 16 August 1942 (age 84)

Playing career^{1}
| Years | Club | Games (Goals) |
| 1961–1969 | Swan Districts | 163 (555) |
- ^{1} Playing statistics correct to the end of 1969.

Eric Desmond Gorman (born 16 August 1942) is a former Australian rules footballer who was highly successful in the West Australian National Football League (WANFL) playing for the Swan Districts Football Club. He began his career at Swan Districts in 1961 and played for 9 seasons in total to the end of the 1969 season. During his time at the club he played 163 games and kicked a total of 555 goals. Part of the premiership sides in 1962 and 1963, Gorman played at full forward in each grand final. He kicked 9 goals in the 1963 grand final which remains a record in WAFL football. Gorman went on finish as Swan Districts top goal kickier on seven consecutive occasions, with his highest tally being 97 goals in 1965.
