= Ken Bagley =

Australian rules footballer

Personal information
- Full name: Kenneth Walter Bagley
- Born: 7 October 1939 (age 87); Perth, Western Australia
- Original team: Midland

Playing career^{1}
Years	Club	Games (Goals)
1958–1970	Swan Districts	230 (98)

Representative team honours^{2}
Years	Team	Games (Goals)
1961–1966	Western Australia	15 (4)
- ^{1} Playing statistics correct to the end of 1970.^{2} Representative statistics correct as of 1966.

Career highlights
- WANFL premiership player – 1961, 1962, 1963; Simpson Medal – 1963

Kenneth Walter Bagley (born 7 October 1939) is a former Australian rules football player who played for the Swan Districts Football Club in the Western Australian National Football League (WANFL) between 1958 and 1970.

== Playing career ==
Bagley was recruited from Midland, making his league debut for Swan Districts in 1958.

A life member of Swan Districts, Bagley played 232 games for the Swans and was a premiership player three times in 1961, 1962 and 1963. He was awarded a Simpson Medal for his best on ground performance in the 1963 grand final.

Bagley was picked in the WA State team in 1961 and 1966 and appears in the Swan Districts team of the century on a half back flank.
