= Don Langsford =

Australian rules footballer

Personal information
- Born: 7 May 1959 (age 67); Cummins, South Australia
- Original team: Scotch College, Perth
- Height: 183 cm (6 ft 0 in)
- Weight: 82 kg (181 lb)
- Position: Half back flank

Playing career^{1}
Years	Club	Games (Goals)
1977–1990	Swan Districts	237 (60)
- ^{1} Playing statistics correct to the end of 1990.

Career highlights
- Swan Districts premiership player: 1982, 1983, 1984 & 1990; Swan Districts captain: 1985–1986; Western Australia representative: 1983, 1984 & 1985

Donald Leslie Langsford (born 7 May 1959) is a former Australian rules footballer who was highly successful in the West Australian Football League (WAFL) playing for the Swan Districts Football Club.

Langsford was initially recruited from the Scotch College, Perth and commenced his long WAFL career in 1977. A noted defender, Langsford played mostly on the half back flank, but still managed to kick 60 career goals. He also played in five WAFL grand finals.

Swan Districts entered a period of remarkable success in the early 1980s by winning a hat-trick of premierships in 1982, 1983 and 1984 with Langsford being an integral part of the team. His best year was in 1983 when he was awarded the "Westside Football" Player of the Year award. In 1985-1986 he captained Swan Districts Football Club as well as the WA State Team and in his career played a total of 5 games for WA.

In 1987 Langsford was recruited as part of the West Coast Eagles inaugural team in the AFL, but only ever played in one Pre-Season game for the team.

John Todd rated Langsford as one of the seven best players he coached at Swan Districts. He is listed in the Swan Districts Team of the Century as an interchange player. Then in later 2008 was named in the Scotch College Football team of the century adding to his collection of great achievements.
