= Jim Davies (footballer) =

Australian rules footballer

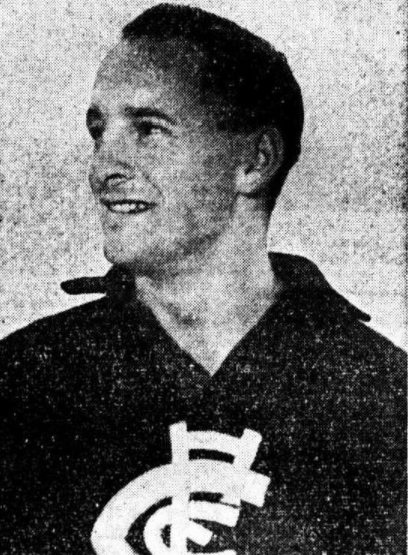

Personal information
- Full name: James Dalis Davies
- Born: 6 December 1926; Cardiff, Wales
- Died: 15 August 2010 (aged 83)
- Height: 173 cm (5 ft 8 in)
- Weight: 72 kg (159 lb)

Playing career^{1}
Years	Club	Games (Goals)
1942	West Perth	1 (0)
1943–1948	Swan Districts	73 (67)
1949–1950	Carlton	16 (1)
1951–1954	Claremont	57 (69)
- ^{1} Playing statistics correct to the end of 1954.

Career highlights
- 1944 Sandover Medal

James Dalis Davies (6 December 1926 – 15 August 2010) was an Australian rules footballer who played for Swan Districts in the West Australian National Football League (WANFL) and Carlton in the Victorian Football League (VFL).

Davies won a Sandover Medal with Swan Districts in 1944 and played with them until being recruited by Carlton for the 1949 season. After two seasons in the VFL he returned to Western Australia to play for Claremont.

After retiring from playing football, he became involved in the administration of the game, culminating in becoming chairman of the WANFL in 1975. He was also the Director-General of the WA education department.

His son Craig Davies represented Australia in field hockey.
