= Murray Rance =

Australian rules footballer

Personal information
- Full name: Murray Douglas Rance
- Born: 25 January 1962 (age 64); Kununoppin, Western Australia
- Original team: Swan Districts (WAFL)
- Debut: Round 1, 1986, Footscray vs. St Kilda, at Western Oval
- Height: 191 cm (6 ft 3 in)
- Weight: 89 kg (196 lb)

Playing career^{1}
Years	Club	Games (Goals)
1981–1985, 1990-1992	Swan Districts	140 (25)
1986–1987	Footscray	40 (5)
1988–1990	West Coast Eagles	57 (7)
Total		237 (37)
- ^{1} Playing statistics correct to the end of 1990.

Career highlights
- Swan Districts premiership side 1982, 1983, 1984; West Coast Eagles captain 1989

Murray Douglas Rance (born 25 January 1962) is a former Australian rules footballer who played with Footscray and West Coast in the Victorian Football League (VFL) during the late 1980s.

He was a key position player and started his career at Swan Districts with whom he won three consecutive premierships starting in 1982. After representing Western Australia at the interstate championships, Rance was recruited to Footscray and spent two seasons at the club. In 1988 he returned to his home state and signed up with West Coast and captained them in 1989. He finished his career back at Swan Districts.

His son Alex also represented Swan Districts and later became a champion full-back at Richmond.
