= Barry Kimberley =

Australian rules footballer

Personal information
- Born: 24 May 1957 (age 69); Perth, Western Australia

Playing career^{1}
Years	Club	Games (Goals)
1979–1982	Perth	76
1983–1986	Swan Districts	83
- ^{1} Playing statistics correct to the end of 1986.

Career highlights
- Premiership Player (WAFL) 1983,1984; Simpson Medal 1984

Barry Robert Kimberley (born 24 May 1957) is a former Australian rules footballer who played in the West Australian Football League (WAFL) playing for the Swan Districts Football Club and the Perth Football Club.

Originally recruited by the Demons in 1978 Kimberley worked his way through the reserves and played his first senior game in 1979. A hard working rover, Kimberley was capable a massing possessions during a game and using the ball wisely once it was won.

He remained with Perth for four seasons before joining the current premiers, Swan Districts, in 1983. Kimberley soon became a vital part with the Swans and played in the 1983 Grand Final mostly in the forward pocket.

In 1984 Kimberley had a stellar season and played that year's Grand Final as a rover where he dominated and racked up a huge number of possessions. Kimberley was awarded the 1984 Simpson Medal for his efforts.

Kimberley played on until the end of the 1986 season before retiring.
