= Brad Shine =

Australian rules footballer

Personal information
- Full name: Bradley John Shine
- Born: 25 September 1959 (age 67)
- Original team: Harvey-Brunswick-Leschenault
- Height: 175 cm (5 ft 9 in)
- Weight: 78 kg (172 lb)

Playing career^{1}
Years	Club	Games (Goals)
1980–84, 1989–90	Swan Districts (WAFL)	111 (85)
1985–88	Carlton (VFL)	23 (2)
- ^{1} Playing statistics correct to the end of 1990.

Career highlights
- Swan Districts premiership player 1982, 1983,1984; Simpson Medal 1983

Bradley John Shine (born 25 September 1959) is a former Australian rules football player who played for the Carlton Football Club in the AFL and Swan Districts Football Club in the WAFL throughout the 1980s and early 1990s.

Shine was recruited to Swan Districts in 1980 the same year as Graham Melrose and Anthony Solin during this time he wore the number 7 guernsey. He fast became an integral part of the dominant Swan Districts side of the early 1980s and played in the 1982, 1983 and 1984 premiership teams. In the 1982 and 1984 Grand Finals, he played on the half forward flank, but in the 1983 Grand Final he played on the ball as a rover and was awarded the Simpson Medal. In 1985 Shine moved eastwards to play for Carlton and was awarded the reserves best and fairest in 1985 and reserves best Clubman in 1986. During his time at Carlton he wore the number 10 guernsey. Returning to Swan Districts in 1989 he played his last season in 1990 after playing 111 games for the club and kicking 85 goals.
