= George Krepp =

Australian rules footballer

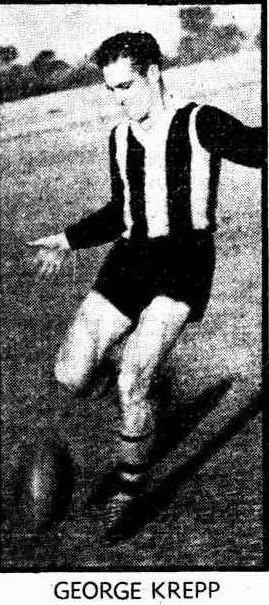

Personal information
- Born: 21 July 1912; Nannine, Western Australia
- Died: 16 August 1973 (aged 61); Mandurah, Western Australia
- Height: 168 cm (5 ft 6 in)
- Weight: 64 kg (141 lb)
- Position: wing

Playing career^{1}
Years	Club	Games (Goals)
1934–1939	Swan Districts	101
- ^{1} Playing statistics correct to the end of 1939.

Career highlights
- Sandover Medallist 1935; WA State Team 1934,1935,1936,1937; Swan Medal 1934,1935,1936.

George Llewellyn Krepp (21 July 1912 – 16 August 1973) was an Australian rules footballer who was highly successful in the West Australian National Football League (WANFL) playing for the Swan Districts Football Club.

Krepp played for Midland Districts in 1933 and was awarded the Cecil Bros. Medal for the best and fairest player in the association.

Picked up Swan Districts in 1934, Krepp played for most of the season. Krepp had an impressive season and the 168 centimetres (5.5 ft) and 64 kilograms (141.1 lb) winger was pressing for state selection. He was noted for his sharp turns and evasive maneuvers and precise kicking skills with both feet.

Krepp is named on the wing in the Swan Districts Team of the Century. He has won the District's club champion award three times.

As part of his excellent 1935 season Krepp also played for the state team which was defeated by the Victorian side by 13 points. Krepp shone on the wing and was one of the few centre-line players who outplayed his opponent. He was selected again to play for the state against South Australia later the same year.

He was the first Swan Districts player to win a Sandover Medal when he tied with Lou Daily from Subiaco in 1935.

In 1936 Krepp was gain selected to play for his state against the South Australians. Western Australia lost the game by a single point with Krepp playing until he was injured late in the game and was replaced by "Bluey" Matthews.

Krepp married Gladys Reid in 1939 in the Ross Memorial Church.

In 1940 Krepp was awarded the fairest and best in the Goldfields Football League winning with 24 votes, 10 more than the next best player. In 1941 Krepp announced he would be leaving to play for Saint Kilda Football Club in the Victorian Football League.
