= Ron Boucher =

Australian rules footballer

Personal information
- Full name: Ronald Eric Boucher
- Born: 24 January 1953 (age 73); Albany, Western Australia
- Original team: North Albany
- Height: 192 cm (6 ft 4 in)
- Weight: 102 kg (225 lb)

Playing career^{1}
| Years | Club | Games (Goals) |
| 1971–1984 | Swan Districts | 193 (87) |
- ^{1} Playing statistics correct to the end of 1984.

Career highlights
- Premiership Player (WAFL) 1982, 1983; WA State Team 1980, 1982; Swan Medal 1982

Ronald Eric Boucher (born 24 January 1953) is a former Australian rules footballer who played in the West Australian Football League (WAFL) playing for the Swan Districts Football Club. He was regarded as a formidable ruckman and is well remembered for his physical clashes with other players, especially Graham Moss.

Boucher was nicknamed "Roo" by his team mates and wore the number 5 guernsey for his career at Swan Districts. He debuted for Swan Districts in 1971 and retired in 1984.

Originally from the North Albany Football Club, Boucher moved to Perth in 1971 to begin his playing career. During the first five years at Bassendean Boucher was regarded as a gentle giant who rarely used his strength to his advantage and after a disappointing 8 game season he left the club in 1976 to play football in the Swan Valley.

John Todd was appointed as the senior coach at Swan Districts in 1977 and enticed Boucher back to the club in 1978 to be developed further as a ruckman. During this time Boucher became more aggressive on the field and could dominate as a knock ruckman and as a strong marking forward.

Swan Districts were transformed during this period and went on to play in the 1980 Grand Final (losing to South Fremantle) in which Boucher played an outstanding game. The team then won the WAFL Grand Final in 1982 and 1983. Boucher won the fairest and best award at Swan Districts Football Club in 1982 and was selected in the Swan Districts Team of the Century.
