= Garry Sidebottom =

Australian rules footballer (1954–2019)

Personal information
- Full name: Garry Thomas Sidebottom
- Born: 21 November 1954; Western Australia
- Died: 28 March 2019 (aged 64)
- Original team: Swan Districts (WANFL)
- Height: 193 cm (6 ft 4 in)
- Weight: 98 kg (216 lb)

Playing career
Years	Club	Games (Goals)
1973–77	Swan Districts	80 (121)
1978–80	St Kilda	54 (86)
1981	Geelong	7 (6)
1982–84	Fitzroy	43 (53)
1985–87	Swan Districts	34 (107)
1974–85	Western Australia	15 (23)
Total		233 (395)

Career highlights
- Swan Medal 1976, 1985; WA State Team 1974–1980, 1983–1985; Leading Goal kicker St Kilda 1979 (56 goals); Leading Goal kicker Swan Districts 1985 (78 goals)

Garry Thomas Sidebottom (21 November 1954 – 28 March 2019) was an Australian rules football player who played for the St Kilda, Geelong and Fitzroy Football Clubs in the Victorian Football League (VFL) and Swan Districts in the West Australian Football League (WAFL) during the 1970s and 1980s.

== Career ==
Sidebottom excelled at playing centre half forward or as a ruckman. He would prove his worth as a forward as he would kick 228 goals while at Swan Districts and 104 goals while in the VFL.

He played in the inaugural State of Origin team for Western Australia in 1977, when Western Australia defeated Victoria. In 1984 Sidebottom kicked six goals for Western Australia against Victoria in another famous victory to the Sandgropers. He represented Western Australia fifteen times in state games.

He joined St Kilda in 1978 and was their leading goal kicker in 1979. In 1980, Sidebottom, while playing for St Kilda in a match against Hawthorn at Moorabbin was dazed when he was hit across his right eye by a flying beer can. He required medical attention before he was able to continue in the match. Despite captaining St Kilda in 1980, his contract was not renewed at the end of the season and he left the club to join Geelong in 1981.

Sidebottom entered football folklore when he missed the Geelong team bus to play in the 1981 Preliminary Final against Collingwood due to a breakdown in communications. His team-mate Peter Johnston took his place at the last minute, despite being told earlier he had not been selected, and went on to play despite having half a chicken and a bucket of chips along with a strawberry thickshake for lunch, and having smoked half a pack of Winfield Blue cigarettes on the way to VFL Park.

To this day, many Geelong locals call the place where the road from Lara enters the Princes Highway "Sidey's Corner". This is where Garry and the team bus were supposed to meet up, but never did.

In April 1982 he was suspended by Geelong due to an unsatisfactory attitude. Despite suggestions that he may return to play for Swan Districts in the WAFL, he remained in Victoria and signed for Fitzroy, making his debut in July 1982.

In 1985 he left Fitzroy to rejoin Swan Districts, where he was their leading goal kicker and won his second best and fairest award, nine years after his previous award, in 1976.

Sidebottom returned to Swan Districts as a coach of the reserves side in 2007. He is the older brother of Allan Sidebottom who also played for Swan Districts, St Kilda and Fitzroy.

He was inducted into the West Australian Football Hall of Fame in 2011.

He died in March 2019 from cancer.
