= Keith Narkle =

Australian rules footballer

Personal information
- Born: 20 November 1952 (age 73); Boddington, Western Australia
- Height: 170 cm (5 ft 7 in)
- Weight: 66 kg (146 lb)

Playing career^{1}
Years	Club	Games (Goals)
1971–1985	Swan Districts	254
- ^{1} Playing statistics correct to the end of 1985.

Career highlights
- WAFL premiership player: 1982, 1983, 1984; Swan Medal: 1977, 1978, 1984; Club captain: 1983–1984; WA state team

Keith Paul Narkle (born 20 November 1952) is a former Australian rules football player of indigenous background who played for the Swan Districts Football Club in the West Australian Football League (WAFL) during the 1970s and 1980s. Keith played in the 1982–83–84 premiership sides for Swans, captaining them to the 1983 and 1984 premierships.

Keith is the older brother of Phil Narkle who also played for Swan Districts Football Club. Keith was a superb footballer with pace to burn and silky skills. He was an ideal wingman and also played on the half forward flank. Keith Narkle was selected on a wing in the Swan Districts Team of the Century.
