= Haydn Bunton Jr. =

Australian rules footballer, born 1937

Personal information
- Full name: Haydn Austin Bunton
- Born: 5 April 1937 (age 89); Caulfield, Victoria, Australia
- Positions: Rover, forward pocket

Playing career^{1}
Years	Club	Games (Goals)
1954–1956	North Adelaide	54 (72)
1958,1960, 1965–1967	Norwood	97 (88)
1961–1964	Swan Districts	89 (112)
1968–1970	Subiaco	59 (41)
Total		299 (313)

Representative team honours
Years	Team	Games (Goals)
1961–64	Western Australia	11 (9)
unknown	South Australia	11 (unknown)

Coaching career^{3}
Years	Club	Games (W–L–D)
1957–1958, 1965–1967	Norwood	101 (52–48–1)
1959	Launceston	16 (6–10–0)
1961–1964	Swan Districts	92 (55–35–2)
1968–1972, 1984–1992	Subiaco	314 (168–145–1)
1975–1982	South Adelaide	179 (84–93–2)
1993–1994	Sturt	42 (9–33–0)
- ^{1} Playing statistics correct to the end of 1970.^{3} Coaching statistics correct as of 1994.

Career highlights
- All-Australian team 1956; North Adelaide best and fairest 1956; Norwood captain-coach 1958, 1965–1967; Swan Districts captain-coach 1961–1964; Swan Districts premiership captain-coach 1961, 1962, 1963; Sandover Medal 1962; Subiaco captain-coach 1968–1970; Subiaco premiership coach 1986, 1988; Australian Football Hall of Fame 1996 (coach); South Australian Football Hall of Fame 2002; WAIS Hall of Champions 2003; West Australian Football Hall of Fame 2004; Subiaco Team of the Century (coach); Swan Districts Team of the Century (forward pocket)

Haydn Austin Bunton (born 5 April 1937) is a former Australian rules footballer and coach. The son of the legendary Haydn Bunton Sr., Bunton Jr. played for North Adelaide and Norwood in the South Australian National Football League (SANFL), as well as Swan Districts and Subiaco in the Western Australian National Football League (WANFL).

Bunton was regarded as a tough and skilful player in both South Australia and Western Australia, but it was as a coach that he cemented a reputation alongside his father as one of Australian football's greatest identities.

Bunton was inducted into the coaches section of the Australian Football Hall of Fame in 1996, as well as the Western Australian Institute of Sport Hall of Champions in 2003 and was made an inaugural member of the WA Football Hall of Fame in 2004 and the SA Football Hall of Fame in 2002.

== Playing career ==
Born in Caulfield, Victoria, Bunton Jr. moved with his father first to Western Australia and then to South Australia. Bunton was hospitalised for two years from the age of three due to a fractured pelvis and Perthes disease in his hip. He wore leg braces and used crutches until he was aged ten.

Haydn Bunton junior made his debut for North Adelaide at the age of 17, and two years seasons later was named an All-Australian player. In 1955, Bunton senior was killed in a car crash, but the following year, the younger Bunton showed his class as a player by finishing runner-up for the Magarey Medal to Dave Boyd. The following year, Haydn "stood out" as a player due to a transfer dispute with North Adelaide, who would not clear him, but amazingly served as a non-playing coach of Norwood. From 1958 to 1960, he played for Norwood, in spite of a serious knee injury sustained in a car accident in Tasmania in 1959.

Bunton had another strong year in 1961, when he was recruited by Swan Districts in the West Australian Football League (WAFL) as captain-coach. At the time Swan Districts were the Cinderella side of the WAFL, having never won more than seven games in a season since 1946, and were generally regarded with "pity or scorn". Swan Districts had lost their last sixteen games of 1960, but improved immediately under Bunton's coaching. They won twelve and drew two of twenty-one matches to finish second, but after a loss to raging-hot premiership favourite East Perth in the second semi-final they were not considered a serious threat. However, after overcoming Subiaco in the preliminary, Bunton developed an ingenious tactic to counter Royals' champion Polly Farmer by using both Keith Slater and Fred Castledine in the ruck contests. Though this ploy was technically illegal, it was accepted by the umpires, and Swan Districts won by 24 points for their first WAFL premiership. In the process of lifting Swan Districts from cellar-dwellers to premiers, Bunton developed a use of handball that was far ahead of its time and also discouraged the use of the erratic drop kick.

The following year Bunton won the Sandover Medal for the league's "fairest and best", completing a rare father-and-son achievement. Swan Districts took their first minor premiership and won both the second semi and grand finals against East Fremantle. Despite finishing fourth after the home-and-away rounds, Swan Districts managed to win three finals and a hat-trick of premierships in 1963; however, 1964 saw the team collapse to sixth of eight clubs with only nine wins.

Bunton returned to Norwood as playing coach from 1965 until 1967, bringing his total number of games for Norwood to 97. In his first season the club played off in the finals, but they slowly declined in 1966 and 1967 finishing seventh of ten teams.

== Coaching career ==
After 1967, Bunton accepted another major challenge when he accepted an appointment as playing coach of Subiaco, for whom his father had won three Sandover Medals, but which had been almost continuously a cellar-dweller for thirty years. Between 1937 and 1967, Subiaco had played in only four senior finals series and overall managed just 186 wins and four draws from 577 senior games for a success rate of 32.58 per cent.

=== Subiaco, 1968 to 1972 ===
In 1967, Subiaco had won only three of 21 games to be four games clear on the bottom, but, aided by an amazing season from full forward Austin Robertson junior, they won twelve games in 1968 to finish fourth, but did not beat top three teams Perth, East Perth and West Perth during perhaps the most uneven season in any of the VFL/AFL, SANFL or WANFL. (Note: In terms of Noll-Scully competitive balance, the 1968 WANFL season's index of 2.5912 is the highest known in any of these leagues.) Bunton played for two more seasons during which Subiaco again lost the first semi-final (though it was their first consecutive seasons in the finals since 1935 and 1936), but stayed on as non-playing coach during 1971 and 1972.

During these two seasons, Subiaco disappointed, winning only eighteen of forty-two games and finishing fifth and sixth in an eight-team competition. However, when Subiaco won its first premiership since 1924 under new coach Ross Smith, it was generally acknowledged that Bunton had played a critical role in raising the team from last to first over the six seasons between 1967 and 1973. During this time, he played a leading role in completely banishing the drop kick from football.

=== South Adelaide, 1975 to 1982 ===
After a two-year sabbatical, Bunton returned to coach South Adelaide in 1975. As with Subiaco, the Panthers had struggled severely ever since World War II, playing in the finals only during the three years of Neil Kerley's tenure as captain-coach. Unlike Subiaco, South Adelaide's improvement under Bunton's patented methods of fast, skilful football was gradual, but the Panthers played in the major round for the first time in eleven years in 1977 and two years later played in only their second grand final since the war and last to date as of 2025.

However, on a muddy ground and extremely windy if dry day Port's experience and luck with the toss told: the Magpies' five goals with the breeze was more than South could manage for an afternoon when not one goal was kicked against the wind and by the last quarter South had little left in them, losing by the score of 3.14 (32) to 9.9 (63). The Panthers did, however, win the NFL night series with VFA and WAFL clubs plus representative teams from "developing" football states in both 1978 and 1979. However, despite playing in the finals and achieving South Adelaide's best minor round since 1964 in the 1981 season, a decline to third last in 1982 saw Bunton replaced by Graham Cornes for 1983.

=== Subiaco, 1984 to 1992 ===
In 1984, Bunton junior returned to his former haunt of Subiaco, who as a result of the loss of such players as Mike Fitzpatrick had endured another bleak era over the previous nine seasons. The Lions had not participated in the finals since 1974 and had finished dead last in 1976, 1979, 1980 and 1982, when they were in danger of a winless season before beating East Fremantle in the seventeenth round. Since 1975 Subiaco had recorded only 44 wins from 189 games and had lost its "average" game over these nine seasons by a margin of 36 points.

However, under Bunton and aided by a powerful country zone, the Lions improved rapidly: from four wins and a percentage of 70 in 1983 they went to nine wins and a percentage of 100 in 1984 and fifteen wins and a percentage of 124.5 in 1985. Despite being in their first finals series since 1974, the Lions only just failed to beat East Fremantle in the grand final and gained ample revenge against the Sharks the following year by eleven and a half goals. Their team was sufficiently good to be competitive against VFL premiers Hawthorn in a post-season "challenge" match. Ironically Hawthorn's win was led by Subiaco's one star of the bleak late 1970s and early 1980s in Gary Buckenara.

An irrepressible Claremont outfit under the innovative coaching of Gerard Neesham halted Subiaco in 1987, but the following year after losing the second semi to the Tigers and being unconvincing in the preliminary against East Fremantle, the Lions, playing a much more traditional game than Claremont and aided by the controversial inclusion of West Coast Eagle Laurie Keene, ran away to win by 62 points after an even first half.

The massive drain of players to the VFL meant Subiaco could not keep up this standard, and they won only six games each in 1989 and 1990 before returning to the Grand Final in 1991 only for Claremont to have its revenge. A thrashing by East Perth in the first week of the 1992 WAFL finals saw Bunton resign at the end of the season after having coached Subiaco's most successful era since before World War II.

=== Sturt, 1993 to 1994 ===
At the age of fifty-six, Bunton was appointed by a Sturt club looking for an experienced coach after Kevin Higgins and Steven Trigg had guided them to only seven wins from 64 games between 1990 and 1992. Sturt had actually possessed interest in Bunton during the early 1980s when they were seeking a replacement for veteran coach Jack Oatey, but lost interest when a decision had to be made at the end of 1982.

Bunton started very badly, with the Double Blues having lost as many as twenty consecutive games before their first win in July. However, they managed to win four of their last eight games but narrowly failed on percentage to avoid a fifth successive wooden spoon. In 1994, things started promisingly with two wins and a near miss against reigning premiers the Eagles before Sturt fell back to its old ways and won only two of its last seventeen games for a sixth wooden spoon on end. Bunton resigned at the end of 1994 to be replaced by Phil Carman, who resurrected the club after on paper the worst modern season in a major Australian rules league the following year.

Bunton's stint at Sturt is generally regarded as his only failure as a coach, though he admitted he enjoyed it, that the Sturt district was "not as productive as it used to be" and that SANFL redistricting had hurt the club.
