= Keith Slater =

Australian sportsman (1935–2025)

Personal information
- Full name: Keith Nichol Slater
- Nickname: Spud
- Born: 12 March 1935 Midland, Western Australia, Australia
- Died: 24 February 2025 (aged 89)
- Cricket career

Cricket information
- Batting: Right-handed
- Bowling: Right-arm fast-medium, right-arm off-spin
- Role: All-rounder

International information
- National side: Australia
- Only Test (cap 212): 9 January 1959 v England

Domestic team information
- Years: Team
- 1955/56–1967/68: Western Australia

Career statistics
| Competition | Test | First-class |
|---|---|---|
| Matches | 1 | 74 |
| Runs scored | 1 | 2198 |
| Batting average | – | 21.13 |
| 100s/50s | 0/0 | 1/13 |
| Top score | 1* | 154 |
| Balls bowled | 256 |
| Wickets | 2 | 140 |
| Bowling average | 50.50 | 42.29 |
| 5 wickets in innings | 0 | 0 |
| 10 wickets in match | 0 | 0 |
| Best bowling | 2/40 | 4/33 |
| Catches/stumpings | 0/– | 50/– |
- Source: CricketArchive, 15 July 2012

Sport
Australian rules football career
Playing career^{1}
| Years | Club | Games (Goals) |
| 1955–58, 1960–63, 1967 | Swan Districts | 166 (201) |
| 1964–1966 | Subiaco | 52 (41) |
| Total | | 218 (242) |
Representative team honours^{2}
| Years | Team | Games (Goals) |
| 1956–1967 | Western Australia | 20 (16) |
Coaching career^{3}
| Years | Club | Games (W–L–D) |
| 1964–1966 | Subiaco | 64 (27–35–2) |
- ^{1} Playing statistics correct to the end of 1967.^{2} Representative statistics correct as of 1967.^{3} Coaching statistics correct as of 1966.
Career highlights
- 1961, 1962, 1963 – WANFL premiership; 1961 – Simpson Medal; Swan Districts Team of the Century

Keith Nichol Slater AM (12 March 1935 – 24 February 2025) was an Australian cricketer and Australian rules footballer. He played one Test cricket match for Australia as an all-rounder. In football, he played for Swan Districts and Subiaco in the West Australian Football League (WAFL) as well as twenty games for the Western Australian state team.

== Cricket career ==
In cricket, Slater was an all-rounder who played in only one Test match, against England in 1958–59, but he played 67 first-class matches for Western Australia between 1955 and 1968. He had his best batting season in 1963–64, scoring 655 runs at an average of 38.52, and scored his only century, 154 against Queensland, when he opened the batting in the second innings and helped Western Australia avert defeat after following-on. His best bowling season was 1960–61, when he took 30 wickets at an average of 32.43. He toured New Zealand with the Australian team in 1959–60, playing in two of the four matches against New Zealand.

His international career was shortened by doubts over his bowling action. Slater wasn't selected for the 1961 Ashes tour of England, even though he had been widely expected to go. The chairman of selectors, Don Bradman, explained it to him as a policy of the Imperial Cricket Conference to exclude bowlers with doubtful actions. He later showed Slater a film of his bowling to illustrate. Slater was indeed called for throwing while playing against New South Wales in 1964–65.

== Australian rules football career ==
Slater was a star footballer for Swan Districts and Subiaco and played in the 1961 WANFL grand final with Swans against East Perth and his display in containing "Polly" Farmer won him the Simpson Medal in a huge upset victory. He continued to play for Swans for the following two seasons before Subiaco, who had between 1947 and 1956 constantly occupied the bottom two places with Swans and whose president Frank Exell had approached Slater a season before, lured him as their captain-coach after two disappointing seasons.

In Slater's first season the Maroons made only their fourth open-age finals appearance since 1936, but were unexpectedly defeated by the equally unsuccessful Claremont in a rainy first semi-final. The following two seasons proved very disappointing, with the Maroons winning only eight games in 1965 and six (plus one draw) in 1966, when they lost their last nine matches. This led to questioning of Slater's coaching methods, notably his taking the Maroons on a trip to Singapore during the 1964/1965 off-season, and his contract was not renewed for 1967. Slater returned to Swan Districts for 1967 but retired following that season.

== Later life and death ==
After he retired from playing, Slater ran a sports store, Slater Gartrell, in Perth, and was also a television and radio sports commentator. He was appointed a Member of the Order of Australia in the 2020 Australia Day Honours for "significant service to cricket, Australian rules football, and baseball, in Western Australia". He was awarded the Australian Sports Medal in 2000.

On 24 February 2025, Slater died at the age of 89.

== See also ==
- List of cricketers called for throwing in top-class cricket matches in Australia
- One Test Wonder
