= Team of the century =

Hypothetical best sports teams

In team sport, team of the century and team of the decade are hypothetical best teams over a given time period. For the century team, it can be either 100 years, or for a century (always the 20th). Similarly the team of the decade can be for 10 years or a decade (for example the 1980s).

Teams of the decade and century are selected for both leagues and clubs and sometimes selected for other reasons, such as to honour the contribution of a particular ethnic group.

Teams of the 20th century in particular have been controversial due to their loose criteria and the systemic bias toward current players, given that the performance of players before the advent of broadcasting of matches cannot be reviewed and relies on hearsay and archival records.

The Team of the Century concept used extensively in the sport of Australian rules football, where, since the mid-1990s, leagues (such as the VFL/AFL or SANFL), as well as football clubs, have named their best team (see Football (Australian rules) positions). Teams of the decades followed.

One of the most famous examples of the team of the century concept was in 1996, when the AFL Team of the Century was named on 2 September 1996, during the League's centenary season.

An example from Ireland was when in 1984 the GAA selected their Football Team of the Century and Hurling Team of the Century to celebrate the first 100 years of the GAA. The term was used again in 2011 when the Team of Century from the Sigerson Cup was chosen.

== Official examples ==
=== Australian rules football ===
- AFL/VFL Team of the Century
- Italian Team of the Century
- Indigenous Team of the Century
- Greek Team of the Century
- Queensland Team of the 20th Century

=== Other sports ===
==== Baseball ====
- Major League Baseball All-Century Team (1999)

==== Gaelic football ====
- Gaelic football Team of the Century

==== Hurling ====
- Hurling Team of the Century

==== Rugby league ====
- Australian Rugby League's Team of the Century

== See also ==
- Major League Baseball All-Time Team (1997)
- Team of the Decade (disambiguation)
- Team of the Year (disambiguation)
