= 1976 WANFL season =

Australian rules football season

- Teams: 8
- Premiers: Perth; 6th premiership
- Minor premiers: East Perth; 14th minor premiership
- Sandover Medallist: Peter Spencer (East Perth)
- Leading goalkicker: Norm Uncle (Claremont)
- Matches played: 88

The 1976 WANFL season was the 92nd season of the Western Australian National Football League in its various incarnations.

After a half-decade in which the fortunes of all WANFL clubs, with the exception of East Perth, fluctuated severely, 1975 and 1976 saw a return to more stability, with Perth establishing themselves along with East Perth and South Fremantle as the top three of the league. Claremont, six games clear on the bottom in 1975, began with seven wins from ten matches but won only once more, whilst 1975 premiers West Perth had a disastrous start with injuries but recovered in June and July to clearly re-establish themselves as one of the top bracket.

Under coach Ken Armstrong, the Demons won their first premiership since Mal Atwell's great team from 1968 – remarkably not one 1968 premiership player appeared eight years later. At the other end of the ladder, 1950s cellar dwellers Subiaco and Swan Districts returned to that position, with the Lions winning only two of their first nineteen games as they lost with no adequate replacements all but twelve of their 1973 senior players to either the VFL, retirement or, with Mick Malone, cricket commitments.

The scoring in 1976 increased to a record average score of 108.05 points per team per game beating the previous record of 101.21 from 1970, a figure nevertheless exceeded in each of the next eleven seasons. From the eighth home-and-away round the WANFL followed the VFL in introducing a second field umpire, a move instantly regarded as a success. Another innovation, in this case five years ahead of the VFL, was playing two games on Sunday afternoons for the first time. Although rated a success, it was not repeated until 1982.

== Home-and-away season ==
=== Round 1 ===
	Round 1
Saturday, 3 April	South Fremantle 18.19 (127)	def.	Swan Districts 13.15 (93)	Fremantle Oval (crowd: 13197)
Saturday, 3 April	West Perth 11.12 (78)	def. by	East Perth 25.13 (163)	Leederville Oval (crowd: 15996)
Saturday, 3 April	Perth 12.15 (87)	def. by	Claremont 14.6 (90)	Lathlain Park (crowd: 10106)
Saturday, 3 April	Subiaco 10.14 (74)	def. by	East Fremantle 17.17 (119)	Subiaco Oval (crowd: 8433)
1975 premiers West Perth's depleted side offers no answer to the Royal midfield whilst 17-year-old full-back Geoff Hendriks conceded nine goals to Archie Duda, who missed 1975 with cartilage problems.; With Norm Uncle kicking seven goals and contrasting with inaccuracy by the Demons, 1975 wooden spooners Claremont win a thriller otherwise dominated by several Victorian imports.

=== Round 2 ===
	Round 2
Saturday, 10 April	Swan Districts 17.15 (117)	def.	West Perth 17.13 (115)	Bassendean Oval (crowd: 10118)
Saturday, 10 April	East Perth 13.16 (94)	def.	South Fremantle 12.16 (88)	Perth Oval (crowd: 15710)
Saturday, 10 April	Claremont 21.15 (141)	def.	Subiaco 8.5 (53)	Claremont Oval (crowd: 8187)
Saturday, 10 April	East Fremantle 19.15 (129)	def.	Perth 15.12 (102)	East Fremantle Oval (crowd: 8588)
Subiaco, unable to retain any of their early-1970s stars, are demolished after half-time when Claremont move future Collingwood defender Kevin Worthington to centre-half-forward and score 13.10 (88) to 2.1 (13).; Victorian recruits Stuart Magee and Gordon Casey compensate for the loss of several stars from 1975 as Swans hold on after being thirty-two points ahead at half-time in a 1975 second semi-final replay.

=== Round 3 (Easter weekend) ===
	Round 3
Saturday, 17 April	West Perth 15.10 (100)	def. by	South Fremantle 21.19 (145)	Leederville Oval (crowd: 16014)
Saturday, 17 April	Perth 16.19 (115)	def.	Subiaco 10.17 (77)	Lathlain Park (crowd: 7208)
Monday, 19 April	East Perth 27.16 (178)	def.	Swan Districts 13.12 (90)	Perth Oval (crowd: 17149)
Monday, 19 April	East Fremantle 16.10 (106)	def. by	Claremont 16.11 (107)	East Fremantle Oval (crowd: 13060)
South Fremantle take revenge for their humiliating 1975 Grand Final defeat with a nine-goal burst in fifteen minutes of the third quarter after the Cardinals took the lead.; Claremont equal their 1975 win tally after an amazing comeback from 6.6 (42) to 13.5 (83) down early in the third quarter. East Fremantle fail to goal in the final forty-five minutes.

=== Round 4 ===
	Round 4
Monday, 26 April	Subiaco 12.14 (86)	def. by	West Perth 18.16 (124)	Subiaco Oval (crowd: 7028)
Monday, 26 April	South Fremantle 14.16 (100)	def. by	Perth 17.15 (117)	Fremantle Oval (crowd: 11010)
Monday, 26 April	Claremont 16.19 (115)	def.	East Perth 15.7 (97)	Claremont Oval (crowd: 14967)
Monday, 26 April	Swan Districts 15.14 (104)	def. by	East Fremantle 19.16 (130)	Bassendean Oval (crowd: 9740)
Owing to an interstate game, this WANFL round was played on the Monday following Anzac Day.; Claremont's size, strength and stamina allows the Tigers to outlast East Perth and exceed their 1975 win tally in a month.; With the return of 1973 leading goalkicker Phil Smith after playing 1974 at Woodville and missing 1975 due to injury, West Perth easily win the battle of the only winless clubs.

=== Round 5 ===
	Round 5
Saturday, 1 May	South Fremantle 29.22 (196)	def.	Subiaco 7.6 (48)	Fremantle Oval (crowd: 6578)
Saturday, 1 May	Perth 11.10 (76)	def.	West Perth 10.14 (74)	Lathlain Park (crowd: 8587)
Saturday, 1 May	Claremont 16.16 (112)	def. by	Swan Districts 17.11 (113)	Claremont Oval (crowd: 9776)
Saturday, 1 May	East Perth 13.11 (89)	def.	East Fremantle 12.12 (84)	Perth Oval (crowd: 10175)
Subiaco record the biggest loss in the WANFL since they themselves lost to South Fremantle in 1953, despite Ray Bauskis kicking 6.10 (46).

=== Round 6 ===
	Round 6
Saturday, 8 May	Swan Districts 21.10 (136)	def.	Perth 13.9 (87)	Bassendean Oval (crowd: 11360)
Saturday, 8 May	Subiaco 9.10 (64)	def. by	East Perth 15.19 (109)	Subiaco Oval (crowd: 6792)
Saturday, 8 May	East Fremantle 18.13 (121)	def. by	South Fremantle 21.10 (136)	East Fremantle Oval (crowd: 14976)
Sunday, 9 May	West Perth 13.12 (90)	def. by	Claremont 15.20 (110)	Leederville Oval (crowd: 12047)

=== Round 7 ===
	Round 7
Saturday, 15 May	Subiaco 11.11 (77)	def. by	Swan Districts 12.14 (86)	Subiaco Oval (crowd: 5833)
Saturday, 15 May	Perth 17.18 (120)	def.	East Perth 16.7 (103)	Lathlain Park (crowd: 8176)
Saturday, 15 May	South Fremantle 24.22 (166)	def.	Claremont 10.8 (68)	Fremantle Oval (crowd: 13096)
Saturday, 15 May	West Perth 19.10 (124)	def.	East Fremantle 16.12 (108)	Leederville Oval (crowd: 6513)
Claremont's bubble bursts as – minus Mal Brown and Barry Price – on a partially soft ground they cannot match South Fremantle's skilled and speedy following division in which Eddie Bauskis is dominant.

=== Round 8 ===
	Round 8
Saturday, 22 May	Swan Districts 18.10 (118)	def. by	South Fremantle 25.21 (171)	Bassendean Oval (crowd: 11870)
Saturday, 22 May	East Perth 20.13 (133)	def.	West Perth 15.15 (105)	Perth Oval (crowd: 12092)
Saturday, 22 May	Claremont 15.9 (99)	def. by	Perth 21.12 (138)	Claremont Oval (crowd: 8585)
Saturday, 22 May	East Fremantle 19.21 (135)	def.	Subiaco 9.8 (62)	East Fremantle Oval (crowd: 5880)
Perth kick twenty of the last 26 goals after being down 1.2 (8) to 9.5 (59) as flag stars-to-be Wiley and Rosbender come to dominate. The last quarter Perth took thirty marks to ten and had 72 kicks to the Tigers' 46.

=== Round 9 ===
	Round 9
Saturday, 29 May	West Perth 20.22 (142)	def.	Swan Districts 11.15 (81)	Leederville Oval (crowd: 6770)
Saturday, 29 May	South Fremantle 16.14 (110)	def. by	East Perth 27.14 (176)	Fremantle Oval (crowd: 10385)
Saturday, 29 May	Subiaco 9.12 (66)	def. by	Claremont 19.12 (126)	Subiaco Oval (crowd: 4875)
Saturday, 29 May	Perth 27.12 (174)	def.	East Fremantle 11.21 (87)	Lathlain Park (crowd: 6089)
The return to form of Bill Valli, discarded at the end of 1975, awakens West Perth, second last on the ladder, after Phil smith injures a knee again.; With their win over a disappointing East Fremantle, Perth move two games clear inside the four despite having several key players in the reserves. Injury-plagued Chester McKean dominated the ruck.

=== Round 10 ===
	Round 10
Saturday, 5 June	South Fremantle 21.10 (136)	def.	West Perth 15.14 (104)	Fremantle Oval (crowd: 10127)
Saturday, 5 June	Swan Districts 20.9 (129)	def.	East Perth 23.15 (153)	Bassendean Oval (crowd: 10680)
Saturday, 5 June	Subiaco 16.8 (104)	def.	Perth 14.12 (96)	Subiaco Oval (crowd: 5565)
Saturday, 5 June	Claremont 24.13 (157)	def.	East Fremantle 8.21 (69)	Claremont Oval (crowd: 7682)
Despite losing the last three quarters and being without full-forward Gary Fathers, Subiaco win their first game for 1976 against the eventual premiers.; With Norm Uncle kicking eight and veterans Bennett and Hayes back in form, Claremont suggest they will be a strong double chance candidate despite not displace South Fremantle from second.

=== Round 11 ===
	Round 11
Sunday, 13 June	East Perth 27.18 (180)	def.	Claremont 11.13 (79)	Perth Oval (crowd: 16785)
Saturday, 19 June	West Perth 14.17 (101)	def.	Subiaco 4.6 (30)	Leederville Oval (crowd: 5346)
Saturday, 19 June	Perth 20.14 (134)	def.	South Fremantle 12.15 (87)	Lathlain Park (crowd: 8418)
Saturday, 19 June	East Fremantle 24.11 (155)	def.	Swan Districts 16.19 (115)	East Fremantle Oval (crowd: 5900)
Owing to National Football League matches against VFL and SANFL clubs, there were no WANFL games on Saturday 12 June; In front of Claremont's second biggest home-and-away crowd to that point, East Perth, boosted by the move of full-back John Daniel to attack, crush the Tigers and stamp themselves as strong premiership favourites.; On the first wet day of the season and despite West Perth "still disappointing" apart from seven-goal full-forward Northcott, Subiaco are the last WA(N)FL team goalless in the second and third quarters until East Fremantle against Claremont in the second last round of 1981.; Perth blanket Brian Ciccosto and Maurice Rioli to kick 10.4 (64) to 0.5 (5) during the third quarter and stand only percentage behind the Bulldogs in the quest for second position.

=== Round 12 ===
	Round 12
Saturday, 26 June	Subiaco 11.11 (77)	def. by	South Fremantle 13.12 (90)	Subiaco Oval (crowd: 5519)
Saturday, 26 June	West Perth 20.13 (133)	def.	Perth 9.13 (67)	Leederville Oval (crowd: 8674)
Saturday, 26 June	Swan Districts 24.13 (157)	def.	Claremont 21.13 (139)	Bassendean Oval (crowd: 8015)
Saturday, 26 June	East Fremantle 22.17 (149)	def.	East Perth 17.10 (112)	East Fremantle Oval (crowd: 8487)
Ian Logan and veterans Whinnen and Dempsey return to their 1975 form to lift West Perth to sixth and suggest they still can defend their premiership.; During the third quarter, Perth players were robbed of cash, watches and jewellery by a thief.; Claremont equal the 1970 record for the highest losing score in WANFL history in a shootout dominated by full-forwards Mark Olsen with nine goals and Norm Uncle with ten, including five in as many minutes during the third quarter.

=== Round 13 ===
	Round 13
Saturday, 3 July	Perth 22.19 (151)	def.	Swan Districts 9.9 (63)	Lathlain Park (crowd: 9564)
Saturday, 3 July	East Perth 25.22 (172)	def.	Subiaco 9.5 (59)	Perth Oval (crowd: 6825)
Saturday, 3 July	Claremont 13.12 (90)	def. by	West Perth 22.15 (147)	Claremont Oval (crowd: 8865)
Saturday, 3 July	South Fremantle 18.16 (124)	def.	East Fremantle 10.12 (72)	Fremantle Oval (crowd: 12817)
Unexpected moves, notable Maurice Rioli to a back pocket, allow South of overcome being jumped by Old Easts for an easy derby win to keep second position.; With the decline of early-season stars Barry Price (centre) and Greg Bennet (rover), Claremont look certain to lose their finals place as West Perth retain their 1975 form.

=== Round 14 ===
	Round 14
Saturday, 10 July	Swan Districts 15.24 (114)	def.	Subiaco 11.7 (73)	Bassendean Oval (crowd: 5354)
Saturday, 10 July	Perth 15.15 (105)	def.	East Perth 10.9 (69)	Perth Oval (crowd: 12313)
Saturday, 10 July	Claremont 11.11 (77)	def. by	South Fremantle 12.20 (92)	Claremont Oval (crowd: 8837)
Saturday, 10 July	East Fremantle 9.7 (61)	def. by	West Perth 9.11 (65)	East Fremantle Oval (crowd: 8370)
On a windy day, Perth thrash the Royals – flattered by the score – with a superb display in defence led by young full-back Brian Cook.; Mel Whinnen's dominance and East Fremantle's repeated use of the "dead” side on a windswept ground ensure the Cardinals enter the four for the first time in 1976 – in the process blacking East Fremantle's only chance to do so.; A magnificent goal by Swans' Garry Sidebottom after the black and whites looked like kicking themselves out of the contest at 5.16 (46) pushed Swan Districts to an easy win over the cellar-dwelling Lions.

=== Round 15 ===
	Round 15
Saturday, 17 July	South Fremantle 19.21 (135)	def.	Swan Districts 9.16 (70)	Fremantle Oval (crowd: 9670)
Saturday, 17 July	West Perth 17.14 (116)	def. by	East Perth 23.11 (149)	Leederville Oval (crowd: 13826)
Saturday, 17 July	Perth 27.7 (169)	def.	Claremont 20.13 (133)	Lathlain Park (crowd: 7292)
Saturday, 17 July	Subiaco 20.22 (142)	def.	East Fremantle 12.13 (85)	Subiaco Oval (crowd: 4237)
Perth's direct play and the roving of Wiley (seven goals) ensures they defeat an improved Claremont in a high-scoring game that was close for over a half.; Given an incentive of $3,000 to win three games in the third series, Subiaco, with rovers Vin Catoggio (in his third WANFL game), Graeme Schultz (ex-Essendon) and Neil Randall dominant, thrash finals hopeful East Fremantle despite spearhead Fathers kicking 3.6 (24).; Swan Districts do not goal until the 14-minute mark of the third quarter, becoming the last WA(N)FL team goalless at half-time until West Perth at Claremont Oval in the sixteenth round of 1989, as future Collingwood star Stan Magro dominates the packs.

=== Round 16 ===
	Round 16
Saturday, 24 July	Swan Districts 17.17 (119)	def. by	West Perth 25.11 (161)	Bassendean Oval (crowd: 7013)
Saturday, 24 July	East Perth 19.12 (126)	def.	South Fremantle 15.8 (98)	Perth Oval (crowd: 13286)
Saturday, 24 July	Claremont 19.15 (129)	def.	Subiaco 12.13 (85)	Claremont Oval (crowd: 5090)
Saturday, 24 July	East Fremantle 25.17 (167)	def.	Perth 14.14 (98)	East Fremantle Oval (crowd: 5819)
West Perth's impressive win over Swan Districts goes a long way towards sealing the four – the loser of the game between Claremont and East Fremantle became sure to drop out of the running.; In Tom Grljusich's 300th game of senior football, the Bulldogs struggle gamely after being outscored with the wind in the opening quarter, despite a superb lone hand in a depleted ruck by Stephen Michael.

=== Round 17 ===
	Round 17
Saturday, 31 July	West Perth 18.17 (125)	def.	South Fremantle 15.16 (106)	Leederville Oval (crowd: 12660)
Saturday, 31 July	East Perth 24.23 (167)	def.	Swan Districts 11.13 (79)	Perth Oval (crowd: 7567)
Saturday, 31 July	Perth 20.19 (139)	def.	Subiaco 11.12 (78)	Lathlain Park (crowd: 5438)
Saturday, 31 July	East Fremantle 24.21 (165)	def.	Claremont 14.7 (91)	East Fremantle Oval (crowd: 8475)
Without Mel Whinnen, West Perth nonetheless produce an impressive win led by the revitalised Bill Valli to give a look ominously similar to that before their devastating displays in the 1975 finals.; East Fremantle show what "might have been” as they exploit superbly Claremont's roving weakness and end the Tigers' finals hopes.

=== Round 18 ===
	Round 18
Saturday, 7 August	Subiaco 7.11 (53)	def. by	West Perth 23.24 (162)	Subiaco Oval (crowd: 4525)
Saturday, 7 August	South Fremantle 13.17 (95)	def. by	Perth 21.15 (141)	Fremantle Oval (crowd: 8072)
Saturday, 7 August	Claremont 10.12 (72)	def. by	East Perth 18.12 (120)	Claremont Oval (crowd: 5285)
Saturday, 7 August	Swan Districts 6.17 (53)	def. by	East Fremantle 25.18 (168)	Bassendean Oval (crowd: 4220)
Perth take second position with a convincing win over an injury-depleted South Fremantle, as Robert Wiley finally confirms himself Western Australia's best rover since Cable with six goals and superb work on the ball.

=== Round 19 ===
	Round 19
Saturday, 14 August	South Fremantle 8.21 (69)	def.	Subiaco 9.6 (60)	Fremantle Oval (crowd: 4098)
Saturday, 14 August	Perth 15.15 (105)	def.	West Perth 7.7 (49)	Lathlain Park (crowd: 7209)
Saturday, 14 August	Claremont 6.14 (50)	def. by	Swan Districts 6.16 (52)	Claremont Oval (crowd: 3142)
Saturday, 14 August	East Perth 16.18 (114)	def.	East Fremantle 9.12 (66)	Perth Oval (crowd: 5616)
On Perth's wettest football day since the infamous "Swim Through Perth” of May 1956, Perth produce a vintage display, holding West Perth to 1.7 (13) in the final three quarters whilst Murray Couper – given a roving commission – kicks 6.4 (40) himself.; Subiaco's stubborn backline and a five-goal burst in ten minutes nearly steals the game from an inaccurate South Fremantle – looking to get several key players into full fitness for the finals.; Claremont lose despite dominating the play as Victorian recruit Gordon Casey plays his best game for Swans and Tiger defender Kim Craig kicks a rare misdirected pass for the first of two winning behinds.

=== Round 20 ===
	Round 20
Saturday, 21 August	Swan Districts 10.13 (73)	def. by	Perth 19.12 (126)	Bassendean Oval (crowd: 6973)
Saturday, 21 August	Subiaco 20.11 (131)	def.	East Perth 17.10 (112)	Subiaco Oval (crowd: 5642)
Saturday, 21 August	West Perth 20.21 (141)	def.	Claremont 13.18 (96)	Leederville Oval (crowd: 7816)
Saturday, 21 August	East Fremantle 12.15 (87)	def. by	South Fremantle 29.15 (189)	East Fremantle Oval (crowd: 12703)
Claremont coach Mal Brown illegally brought back John Colreavy when Jeff Murray was injured in a collision with Norm Uncle, which led to the introduction of the interchange rule despite a West Perth protest.; In Colin Williams' record 252nd match for the club, Subiaco win an amazing match with a record 19.3 (117) kicked in the third quarter before Subiaco's defence holds East Perth goalless in the last and overpowers the top-of-the-ladder Royals. Subiaco runner Darryl Foster was reported for abusive language.

=== Round 21 ===
	Round 21
Saturday, 28 August	Subiaco 16.13 (109)	def.	Swan Districts 13.13 (91)	Subiaco Oval (crowd: 3817)
Saturday, 28 August	Perth 10.7 (67)	def. by	East Perth 11.14 (80)	Lathlain Park (crowd: 9568)
Saturday, 28 August	South Fremantle 15.26 (116)	def.	Claremont 7.12 (54)	Fremantle Oval (crowd: 5962)
Saturday, 28 August	West Perth 13.12 (90)	def.	East Fremantle 8.14 (62)	Leederville Oval (crowd: 4828)
A brilliant display by Sandover Medallist Spencer in wet conditions silences Perth's on-ball brigade to place the Demons in an uncomfortable position against West Perth in the first semi.

== Ladder ==
1976 WANFL ladder
Pos	Team	Pld	W	L	D	PF	PA	PP	Pts
1	East Perth	21	16	5	0	2696	2004	134.5	64
2	South Fremantle	21	14	7	0	2576	2062	124.9	56
3	Perth (P)	21	14	7	0	2414	2026	119.2	56
4	West Perth	21	12	9	0	2346	2093	112.1	48
5	East Fremantle	21	9	12	0	2325	2322	100.1	36
6	Claremont	21	8	13	0	2135	2409	88.6	32
7	Swan Districts	21	7	14	0	2053	2726	75.3	28
8	Subiaco	21	4	17	0	1608	2511	64.0	16

Rules for classification: 1) points; 2) percentage; 3) number of points for.
(P) Premiers

== Finals ==
=== First semi-final ===
	First semi-final
Saturday, 4 September	Perth 20.18 (138)	def.	West Perth 13.4 (82)	Subiaco Oval (crowd: 23,091)
Young ruckmen Dean Herbert and Wim Rosbender revitalised Perth to a remarkable comeback from 34 points down halfway through the third quarter to kick 16.7 (103) to 2.1 (13) for the remainder of the match.

=== Second semi-final ===
	Second semi-final
Saturday, 11 September	East Perth 20.18 (138)	def.	South Fremantle 15.15 (105)	Subiaco Oval (crowd: 31,147)
East Perth win well despite playing the last three quarters with sixteen fit players, which leads to angry criticism by Bulldog coach Colin Beard about his team's last two finals efforts.

=== Preliminary final ===
	Preliminary final
Saturday, 18 September	South Fremantle 10.21 (81)	def. by	Perth 20.19 (139)	Subiaco Oval (crowd: 23,137)
A decision to give Perth first use of the wind backfires as an inaccurate South Fremantle are never in the match and coach Beard said he was ready to give up despite the club's confidence in him.

=== Grand Final ===
1976 WANFL Grand Final
Saturday, 25 September	East Perth	def. by	Perth	Subiaco Oval (crowd: 45,823)
2.0 (12); 4.2 (26); 9.3 (57); 11.3 (69)	Q1; Q2; Q3; Final	3.5 (23); 6.10 (46); 10.12 (72); 13.14 (92)	Umpires: Ross Capes, Ron Powell; Simpson Medal: Mal Day (Perth)
Duda 4, Quatermaine 3, Levetzke, Hamilton, Daniel, Verstegen	Goals	Couper 4, Gibellini 3, Mitsopoulos 2, Hargrave, Farrant, Herbert, Wiley
Smith, Hamilton, Webster, McGinnty, Quartermaine, Spencer, Webster	Best	Day, Gibellini, Herbert, Rosbender, Watt, Wiley, Will, Couper
In a dour game in windy conditions, Perth via a superb defence comfortably account for a Royal team only kept in the game by accuracy.
