= Alan Quartermaine (footballer) =

Australian rules footballer

Personal information
- Full name: Alan R. Quartermaine
- Born: 23 November 1951 (age 74); Katanning, Western Australia
- Original team: Katanning Wanderers (UGSFL)
- Height: 180 cm (5 ft 11 in)
- Positions: Wing, half-forward flank

Playing career
Years	Club	Games (Goals)
1969–1979	East Perth	108 (195)

Representative team honours
Years	Team	Games (Goals)
1973–76	Western Australia	2 (1)

Career highlights
- Sandover Medal 1975

Alan R. Quartermaine (born 23 November 1951) is a former Australian rules footballer who played for the East Perth Football Club in what is now the West Australian Football League (WAFL). Debuting in 1969, he won the 1975 Sandover Medal as the best player in the competition, but retired in 1979 after just 108 senior games.

== Football career ==
Quartermaine was born in Katanning, Western Australia, playing under-17s football at the age of 11 and making his debut for the Katanning Wanderers in the Upper Great Southern Football League (UGSFL) at the age of 15. The WANFL had no country zoning at the time, and several clubs wished to recruit him, with East Perth eventually signing him. He played four games in the 1969 season, but most of his time was devoted to completing an economics degree at the University of Western Australia. He represented the university's football club in the Western Australian Amateur Football League (WAAFL) in the 1970 and 1971, gaining Amateur All-Australian selection in both seasons, and playing in the club's 1971 premiership. Quartermaine returned to East Perth for the 1972 season after the completion of his studies, missing out on the club's grand final win due to a three-week suspension for rough play in the second semi-final. He was selected for Western Australia in 1974, leading to offers from several Victorian Football League (VFL) clubs, which he turned down. Despite suffering from osteitis pubis during the season, and being a 15:1 outsider, Quartermaine won the 1975 Sandover Medal with 16 votes, ahead of teammates Peter Spencer and Ross Glendinning, and Stan Nowotny of Swan Districts, all with 14 votes. Quartermaine took the 1978 season off to complete an honours degree in economics, and played only two games in 1979 before retiring due to injury.

== Later life ==
Quartermaine served as general manager of the Subiaco Football Club from 1979 to 1980, and won the Swim Thru Rottnest (now the Rottnest Channel Swim) in 1981. In July 2011, Quartermaine was charged with assaulting a female bouncer at a pub in Fremantle. He later pleaded guilty to three charges of assault and one charge of assault occasioning bodily harm, and was fined A$4,500; his son, Joel Quartermaine, was also charged over the incident and received a $4,000 fine and a spent conviction.

== See also ==
- Category:East Perth Football Club players
