= 1949 SAAFL season =

1949 premiership season
- Date: 24 April - 24 September
- Premiers: A1: Semaphore Central; A2: Colonel Light Gardens; A3: Flinders Park
- Minor premiers: A1: University; A2: Colonel Light Gardens; A3: Flinders Park
- Wooden spooners: A1: Prince Alfred O.C. A2: Goodwood B A3: King's O.C. B
- Best and fairest: A1 (Hone Medal): Fred Peters (Exeter captain/coach); A2 (Chambers Medal): Harold Simpson (Colonel Light Gardens); A3 (McKay Medal): Bob Prater (Postal Institute)
- Leading goalkicker: A1: Max Basheer (University) 59 goals A2: A3:

The 1949 SAAFL season was the 31st season of the South Australian Amateur Football League (SAAFL).

The season commenced on 24 April and concluded on 24 September.

Three new clubs joined this season, all joining A3. Those being Riverside, having played in the Port Adelaide District and Adelaide & Suburban Associations; Flinders Park, having played in United Church as Flinders Park Methodist, Adelaide & Suburban, West Torrens District Associations and in the Amateur League for a season in 1933; and Rosewater, having played in Adelaide & Suburban and Port Adelaide District Associations. Payneham B departed as their A team was relegated to A2.

== A1 ==
=== Ladder ===
Pos	Team	Pld	W	L	D	PF	PA	Pts
1	University	18	16	2	0	1969	1044	32
2	Exeter	18	15	3	0	1735	1250	30
3	Walkerville	18	14	4	0	1926	1253	28
4	Semaphore Central	18	14	4	0	1603	1096	28
5	Woodville	18	9	9	0	1524	1509	18
6	Kelvinator	18	7	11	0	1146	1347	14
7	Alberton Church United	18	5	13	0	1110	1562	10
8	King's O.C.	18	4	14	0	1257	1688	8
9	Goodwood	18	3	15	0	1120	1831	6
10	Prince Alfred O.C.	18	3	15	0	1041	1801	6

=== Finals ===
==== Semi Finals ====
	Semi-finals
Saturday, 10 September	University 9.13 (67)	def. by	Walkerville 15.7 (97)	Teachers' College Oval
Saturday, 10 September	Exeter 6.10 (46)	def. by	Semaphore Central 9.10 (64)	Alberton Oval (crowd: 1,000)

==== Final ====
Saturday, 17 September	Walkerville	def. by	Semaphore Central	Woodville Oval
12.5 (77)	Q1; Q2; Q3; Final	17.11 (113)

==== Challenge Final ====
Sir George Murray Shield
Saturday, 24 September	University	def. by	Semaphore Central	Alberton Oval
0.3 (3); 2.3 (15); 3.8 (26); 4.10 (34)	Q1; Q2; Q3; Final	5.2 (32); 6.5 (41); 8.6 (54); 8.11 (59)
Walsh 2, Butterworth, Basheer	Goals	Burton 3, Edwards 2, Magnusson, King, Reeves
White, Michelmore, Harris, Bungey, Dewar, Walsh, Downing	Best	Inglis, Line, Sweeney, Salyemini, Quinn, Mugg, Magnussen

== A2 ==
=== Ladder ===
Pos	Team	Pld	W	L	D	PF	PA	Pts
1	Colonel Light Gardens	18	18	0	0	1782	793	36
2	Payneham	18	14	4	0	1727	966	28
3	Teachers' College	18	12	5	1	1492	915	25
4	St. Peter's O.C.	18	12	6	0	1597	928	24
5	University B	18	11	6	1	1362	916	23
6	Kenilworth	18	9	9	0	134	1278	18
7	Railways' Institute	18	7	11	0	1005	1082	14
8	Scotch O.C.	18	3	15	0	778	1831	6
9	Christian Brothers O.C.	18	2	16	0	736	1493	4
10	Goodwood B	18	1	17	0	460	2070	2

=== Finals ===
==== Semi Finals ====
	Semi-finals
Saturday, 10 September	Colonel Light Gardens 8.12 (60)	def.	Teachers' College 7.15 (57)	Goodwood Oval
Saturday, 10 September	Payneham 10.8 (68)	drew with	St. Peter's O.C. 10.8 (68)	Mortlock Park Oval
Saturday, 17 September (Semi-Final Replay)	Payneham 14.11 (95)	def. by	St. Peter's O.C. 16.11 (107)	Teachers' College Oval

==== Final ====
Saturday, 24 September	Colonel Light Gardens	def.	St. Peter's O.C.	Walkerville Oval
5.7; 9.8; 14.10; 16.11	Q1; Q2; Q3; Final	2.1; 3.1; 7.5; 10.10
Mahoney 4, Allen 2, Palmer 2, Gray 2, Headon 2, Murphy 2, Plew, Simpson	Goals	Day 3, Nicholls 2, Hay 2, Gun, McFarlane, Bavistock
May, Gray, B. Allen, L. Palmer, Simpson, Rosenthal	Best	Brookman, Stevenson, Selph, Gun, Copley, Hay

== A3 ==
=== Ladder ===
Pos	Team	Pld	W	L	D	PF	PA	Pts
1	Flinders Park	18	18	0	0	2820	435	36
2	Riverside	18	15	3	0	1695	622	30
3	Rosewater	18	14	4	0	1471	740	28
4	Postal Institute	18	12	6	0	1538	1387	24
5	St. Peter's O.C. B	18	9	9	0	1150	1411	18
6	Pulteney O.S.	18	8	10	0	758	1153	16
7	Teachers' College B	18	5	13	0	844	1608	10
8	Queen's O.C.	18	5	13	0	696	1557	10
9	Prince Alfred O.C. B	18	4	14	0	751	2050	8
10	King's O.C. B	18	0	18	0	184	1010	0

King's O.C. B forfeited all remaining matches after round 7.

=== Finals ===
==== Semi Finals ====
	Semi-finals
Saturday, 10 September	Flinders Park 18.16 (124)	def.	Rosewater 2.10 (22)	Hawthorn Oval (Price Memorial Oval)
Saturday, 10 September	Riverside 22.13 (145)	def.	Postal Institute 8.11 (59)	Walkerville Oval

==== Final ====
Saturday, 17 September	Flinders Park	def.	Riverside	Alberton Oval
16.17 (113)	Q1; Q2; Q3; Final	2.7 (19)
K. Wood 5, Morgan 4, J. Johncock 2, J. Howell, Larkin, A. Martin, C. Turner, A. Bergen	Goals	R. Clarke 2

== Representative ==
=== vs V.A.F.A. ===
Monday June 13

SAAFL
B:	Ferguson (Walkerville)	Dewar (University, vice-captain)	Curnow (Walkerville)
HB:	Johnson (Kelvinator)	Brebner (University)	Natt (Exeter)
C:	Dowding (University)	Woodward (University)	Jarrett (Walkerville)
HF:	Wood (King's O.C.)	Tregonning (University, captain)	Davies (University)
F:	Allen (Colonel Light Gardens)	Michelmore (University)	Williams (King's O.C.)
Foll:	Garland (Woodville)	Jones (Kelvinator)	Harvey (Exeter)
Res:	Burke (Payneham)	Griffiths (Semaphore Central)	
Coach:	Harold Page		

King's Birthday
Monday, 13 June (2:30pm)	V.A.F.A.	def.	S.A.A.F.L.	St. Kilda Cricket Ground
0.5 (5); 6.8 (44); 10.13 (73); 15.18 (108)	Q1; Q2; Q3; Final	2.5 (17); 3.6 (24); 3.6 (24); 3.8 (26)
Ebert 4, Russell 3, Backhouse 2, Judd 2, Birtles 2, Mellors, Spencer	Goals	Tregonning 3
Ebert, Mellors, Spencer, Judd, Arnold, Cordner	Best	Brebner, Ferguson (BOG for SA), Dowding, Jarrett, Tregonning, Wood

=== vs S.A. Football Association ===
combined SANFL B teams. Saturday July 23. curtain raiser to the interstate match between SANFL and VFL.

SAAFL
B:	Ferguson (Walkerville, captain)	Dewar (University, vice-captain)	Jones
HB:	Seedsman	Brebner (University)	Line
C:	Jarrett (Walkerville)	Griffiths (Semaphore Central)	Dowding (University)
HF:	Wood (King's O.C.)	Sanders	Davies (University)
F:	Michelmore (University)	Morgan	Basheer
Foll:	Garland (Woodville)	Quinn	Harvey (Exeter)
Res:	Allen (Colonel Light Gardens)	Johnson (Kelvinator)	
Coach:	Harold Page		

Saturday, 23 July (12:00pm)	S.A.F.A.	def.	S.A.A.F.L.	Adelaide Oval
6.3 (39); 6.4 (40); 10.9 (69); 12.13 (85)	Q1; Q2; Q3; Final	1.1 (7); 3.4 (22); 7.6 (48; 10.7 (67)
Hoffman 4, Graham 3, Sully 2, Nicholls, Potter, Tidswell	Goals	Morgan 3, Davies 2, Michelmore 2, Basheer, Garland, Harvey
Hoffman, Cock, Post, Warren, Sully, Graham, Tidswell	Best	Griffiths, Michelmore, Dowding, Harvey, Basheer, Brebner, Davies
McKenzie (leg, replaced by Thorsen)	Injuries

=== vs W.A.A.F.A. ===
Western Australia Amateur Football Association. Saturday 13 August

SAAFL
B:	E. Jones (Kelvinator)	Dewar (University)	Ferguson (Walkerville, captain)
HB:	Line (Semaphore Central)	Brebner (University)	Seedsman (University)
C:	Dowding (University)	Wood (King's O.C.)	McInerney
HF:	Pederson (Exeter)	Sanders (Prince Alfred O.C.)	Davies (University)
F:	Poulton (Walkerville)	Morgan (Flinders Park)	Basheer (University)
Foll:	Michelmore (University)	Quinn (Semaphore Central)	Harvey (Exeter)
Res:	Johnson (Kelvinator)	Ladd (University)	
Coach:	Harold Page		

Saturday, 13 August (2:30pm)	S.A.A.F.L.	def.	W.A.A.F.A.	Adelaide Oval (crowd: 3,500)
4.1 (25); 7.2 (44); 12.5 (77); 15.10 (100)	Q1; Q2; Q3; Final	3.3 (21); 8.8 (56); 9.11 (65); 12.13 (85)	Umpires: A.K. Tucker
Morgan 4, Harvey 3, Basheer 3, Sanders 2, Michelmore, Quinn, Davis	Goals	Ralph 7, Porter 2, Burns 2, Miles
Basheer, Michelmore, Harvey, Dowding, Wood, Sanders, Quinn	Best	K. Smith, Ralph, Wharton, Lenergan, Gaunt, Stephen, Murphy

12:30pm as curtain raiser, a River Murray Association combined side 8.12 (60) defeated by Flinders Park 12.8 (80). This was Flinders Park's 50th successive win.
