= 1939 WANFL season =

Australian rules football season

- Teams: 8
- Premiers: Claremont; 2nd premiership
- Minor premiers: Claremont; 2nd minor premiership
- Sandover Medallist: Haydn Bunton, Sr. (Subiaco)
- Leading goalkicker: Albert Gook (Perth)
- Matches played: 84

The 1939 WANFL season was the 55th season of the various incarnations of the Western Australian National Football League. It is best known for West Perth's record losing streak of twenty-seven matches up to the fifteenth round, an ignominy equalled by Peel Thunder in their formative years but never actually beaten. The Cardinals finished with the worst record since Midland Junction lost all twelve games in 1917, and were the first WANFL team with only one victory for twelve seasons. In their only win, champion forward Ted Tyson became the first West Australian to kick over one thousand goals and he just failed to replicate his 1938 feat of leading the goalkicking for a bottom club. Subiaco, despite a second Sandover win from Haydn Bunton (in spite of several problematic leg injuries) won only three matches, and Swan Districts, affected by the loss of star goalkicker Ted Holdsworth to Kalgoorlie, and unable to acquire either of two sought replacements from South Adelaide (Note: Centre half-forward K. Brown) or West Adelaide (Note: Full-forward Bill Isaac, who was also a fast bowler at cricket and would in fact transfer to South for the 1939 SANFL season and to Northwood–North Adelaide during the war.), began a long period as a cellar-dweller with a fall to sixth.

Claremont, with captain George Moloney returning to the goalfront from the centre, won their second consecutive premiership despite the loss of many key players in the week before the Grand Final, whilst East Fremantle and East Perth remained firmly entrenched in the top and had a neck-and-neck battle late in the season for the double chance. Perth and South Fremantle, both of whom had had long periods in the wilderness, fought an exciting battle for the last place in the top four that ended with the red and whites winning by the narrowest of margins, in the process providing a basis for the club's dynasty following World War II, which began on the weekend of the penultimate round.

Two key rule changes were made in the WANFL and nationally in 1939. The holding the ball rule was altered to eliminate the provision for a player to drop the ball when tackled, meaning that a player was forced to either kick or handpass the ball when tackled to avoid conceding a free kick; and, the boundary throw-in was reintroduced whenever the ball went out of bounds, except when put out deliberately, instead of a free kick being awarded against the last player to touch the ball, as had been the case since 1925.

== Home-and-away season ==
=== Round 1 ===
	Round 1
Saturday, 22 April (2:45 pm)	Claremont 17.15 (117)	def.	East Fremantle 11.13 (79)	Claremont Oval
Saturday, 22 April (2:45 pm)	West Perth 11.17 (83)	def. by	Subiaco 12.17 (89)	Leederville Oval
Saturday, 22 April (2:45 pm)	South Fremantle 15.19 (109)	def.	Swan Districts 12.12 (84)	Fremantle Oval
Saturday, 22 April (2:45 pm)	Perth 9.11 (65)	def. by	East Perth 14.9 (93)	WACA
Claremont unfurls its first pennant with a convincing win over an inexperienced Old Easts side lacking George Doig, who was unsure whether he would play more football because of his work as a florist.

=== Round 2 (Labour Day) ===
	Round 2
Saturday, 29 April (2:45 pm)	South Fremantle 21.12 (138)	def.	East Fremantle 11.13 (79)	Fremantle Oval
Saturday, 29 April (2:45 pm)	West Perth 7.8 (50)	def. by	Perth 22.17 (149)	Leederville Oval
Saturday, 29 April (2:45 pm)	Swan Districts 7.14 (56)	def. by	Claremont 18.13 (121)	Bassendean Oval
Monday, 1 May (2:45 pm)	Subiaco 12.8 (80)	def. by	East Perth 12.15 (87)	Subiaco Oval
Gook's sixteen goals is easily a match record for Perth, with the next best thirteen by Murray Couper and Allan Evans.; Claremont’s 11.7 (73) in the last quarter remains the equal most points ever scored in a final quarter at Bassendean.

=== Round 3 ===
	Round 3
Saturday, 6 May (2:45 pm)	Perth 13.12 (90)	def.	Subiaco 10.20 (80)	WACA
Saturday, 6 May (2:45 pm)	East Perth 16.9 (105)	def.	West Perth 9.15 (69)	Perth Oval
Saturday, 6 May (2:45 pm)	Claremont 15.15 (105)	def.	South Fremantle 9.13 (67)	Claremont Oval
Saturday, 6 May (2:45 pm)	East Fremantle 18.20 (128)	def.	Swan Districts 12.6 (78)	Fremantle Oval
With George Doig rescinding his retirement, East Fremantle win their first game of the year against the still-winless Swans.; Claremont end South Fremantle's strong start with a convincing win due to Reeves’ ruck dominance and their ability to counter South’s handball.

=== Round 4 ===
	Round 4
Saturday, 13 May (2:45 pm)	South Fremantle 14.11 (95)	def. by	Perth 16.19 (115)	Fremantle Oval
Saturday, 13 May (2:45 pm)	Swan Districts 8.12 (60)	def. by	East Perth 18.13 (121)	Bassendean Oval
Saturday, 13 May (2:45 pm)	West Perth 11.12 (78)	def. by	East Fremantle 20.20 (140)	Leederville Oval
Saturday, 13 May (2:45 pm)	Subiaco 12.8 (80)	def. by	Claremont 19.11 (125)	Subiaco Oval
West Perth suffer their sixteenth consecutive defeat, the worst run the WA(N)FL since Midland Junction lost their last nineteen matches in 1916 and 1917, though Perth went 22 games without a win in 1922 and 1923.; Bunton kicks seven goals for Subiaco with a painful leg injury that prevents him roving but the Maroons are no match for unbeaten Claremont.; Austin Gardiner kicks ten goals for East Perth as their 1938 first semi-final opponents, without Holdsworth, remain winless ahead of only West Perth.

=== Round 5 ===
	Round 5
Saturday, 20 May (2:45 pm)	Perth 18.10 (118)	def.	Swan Districts 12.12 (84)	WACA
Saturday, 20 May (2:45 pm)	Claremont 13.16 (94)	def.	West Perth 13.11 (89)	Claremont Oval
Saturday, 20 May (2:45 pm)	East Fremantle 25.9 (159)	def.	Subiaco 9.13 (67)	Fremantle Oval
Saturday, 20 May (2:45 pm)	East Perth 10.17 (77)	def.	South Fremantle 9.9 (63)	Perth Oval
Claremont have a lucky escape against the Cardinals in a match it was suspected they treated lightly: a fine mark from Sammy Clarke saves them.; George Doig, after two modest matches, kicks eleven goals as Old Easts show they have fully recovered from a poor start with a crushing win over the Maroons.

=== Round 6 ===
	Round 6
Saturday, 27 May (2:45 pm)	Swan Districts 10.10 (70)	def.	Subiaco 8.14 (62)	Bassendean Oval
Saturday, 27 May (2:45 pm)	East Fremantle 15.21 (111)	def.	Perth 12.11 (83)	Fremantle Oval
Saturday, 27 May (2:45 pm)	East Perth 15.13 (103)	def.	Claremont 12.11 (83)	Perth Oval
Saturday, 27 May (2:45 pm)	West Perth 11.7 (73)	def. by	South Fremantle 16.16 (112)	Leederville Oval
East Perth win the battle of the remaining unbeaten clubs to go clear top with an outstanding display led by the defence of Starr.

=== Round 7 ===
	Round 7
Saturday, 3 June (2:45 pm)	Subiaco 15.16 (106)	def.	West Perth 13.9 (87)	Subiaco Oval
Saturday, 3 June (2:45 pm)	Swan Districts 13.23 (101)	def.	South Fremantle 15.10 (100)	Bassendean Oval
Saturday, 3 June (2:45 pm)	East Fremantle 10.8 (68)	def. by	Claremont 16.18 (114)	Fremantle Oval
Saturday, 3 June (2:45 pm)	Perth 13.11 (89)	def.	East Perth 11.12 (78)	Perth Oval
Weakened by the absence with injury of "Scranno" Jenkins and Neal Lewington, South Fremantle unexpectedly fade out in the second half against lowly Swan Districts.

=== Round 8 ===
	Round 8
Saturday, 10 June (2:45 pm)	East Fremantle 19.14 (128)	def.	East Perth 13.15 (93)	Fremantle Oval
Saturday, 10 June (2:45 pm)	Perth 13.11 (89)	def. by	Claremont 20.13 (133)	WACA
Saturday, 10 June (2:45 pm)	Subiaco 13.14 (92)	def. by	South Fremantle 22.21 (153)	Subiaco Oval
Saturday, 10 June (2:45 pm)	West Perth 14.14 (98)	def. by	Swan Districts 15.12 (102)	Leederville Oval
Swan Districts' narrow escape was to be their last win at Leederville until August 11 of 1956. The intervening 23-game streak is the longest losing streak by any WA(N)FL club at an opposition ground.

=== Round 9 ===
	Round 9
Saturday, 17 June (2:45 pm)	South Fremantle 18.14 (122)	def.	East Fremantle 14.18 (102)	Fremantle Oval
Saturday, 17 June (2:45 pm)	Claremont 16.13 (109)	def.	Swan Districts 12.17 (89)	Claremont Oval
Saturday, 17 June (2:45 pm)	East Perth 25.18 (168)	def.	Subiaco 13.12 (90)	Perth Oval
Saturday, 17 June (2:45 pm)	Perth 21.16 (142)	def.	West Perth 11.4 (70)	WACA
On the Sunday, Claremont were beaten 15.12 (102) to 17.19 (121) by a Goldfields team in Kalgoorlie, after being 53 points down at half-time. The Tigers were to tour Broken Hill during the following weeks.; Despite a very heavy ground from 2.21 inches (56.1 mm) of rain over four days, Bert Gook kicks ten goals to move to 62 for the season.

=== Round 10 (Foundation Day) ===
	Round 10
Monday, 5 June (2:45 pm)	Subiaco 12.14 (86)	def. by	Claremont 14.7 (91)	Subiaco Oval
Saturday, 1 July (2:45 pm)	East Fremantle 22.26 (158)	def.	West Perth 7.11 (53)	Fremantle Oval
Saturday, 1 July (2:45 pm)	Perth 11.9 (75)	def. by	South Fremantle 10.18 (78)	WACA
Saturday, 1 July (2:45 pm)	East Perth 9.12 (66)	def.	Swan Districts 4.11 (35)	Perth Oval
A depleted Claremont team are saved from losing to seventh-placed Subiaco by that team’s inaccuracy in the closing stages.; Despite a rare spell of fine weather during an extremely wet winter throughout southern Australia, Swan Districts kick their lowest score to date in the WANFL, not goalling between quarter-time and time-on in the last quarter.

=== Round 11 ===
	Round 11
Saturday, 8 July (2:45 pm)	Swan Districts 3.9 (27)	def. by	East Fremantle 7.17 (59)	Bassendean Oval
Saturday, 8 July (2:45 pm)	West Perth 9.13 (67)	def. by	East Perth 17.23 (125)	Leederville Oval
Saturday, 8 July (2:45 pm)	South Fremantle 13.16 (94)	def.	Claremont 11.9 (75)	Fremantle Oval
Saturday, 8 July (2:45 pm)	Subiaco 7.16 (58)	def. by	Perth 12.17 (89)	Subiaco Oval
In heavy rain, Swan Districts kick their lowest score for the second successive match and still their lowest against East Fremantle.; Perth full-back Austin Robertson, Sr. uses the now-obsolete place kick into the wind and manages kicks over fifty metres, which give the Redlegs a comfortable win.

=== Round 12 ===
	Round 12
Saturday, 15 July (2:45 pm)	Swan Districts 9.13 (67)	def.	Perth 7.8 (50)	Bassendean Oval
Saturday, 15 July (2:45 pm)	South Fremantle 13.9 (87)	def. by	East Perth 19.16 (130)	Fremantle Oval
Saturday, 15 July (2:45 pm)	West Perth 4.14 (38)	def. by	Claremont 21.11 (137)	Leederville Oval
Saturday, 15 July (2:45 pm)	Subiaco 7.15 (57)	def. by	East Fremantle 17.11 (113)	Subiaco Oval
West Perth equal Subiaco's 1902-03 record of 24 consecutive defeats with a crushing loss in a game where they dominated territorially for long periods but nonetheless had only 2.14 (26) to 10.5 (65) on the beard at three-quarter time, before Claremont doubled its own score in the rain in the last.; A depleted Swan Districts, with five regulars out, surprises Perth in a match where the Redlegs fail to adapt when the rain comes after quarter-time.

=== Round 13 ===
	Round 13
Saturday, 22 July (2:45 pm)	Perth 10.18 (78)	def. by	East Fremantle 12.8 (80)	WACA
Saturday, 22 July (2:45 pm)	South Fremantle 23.18 (156)	def.	West Perth 17.12 (114)	Fremantle Oval
Saturday, 22 July (2:45 pm)	Subiaco 15.10 (100)	def.	Swan Districts 9.17 (71)	Subiaco Oval
Saturday, 22 July (2:45 pm)	Claremont 18.11 (119)	def.	East Perth 14.9 (93)	Claremont Oval
Ted Tyson kicks eleven goals, including a brilliant "soccer" kick over his head regarded as the best WANFL goal of the year, but cannot stop the Cardinals from establishing a new record for most consecutive losses.; On a WACA ground that could not dry out after rain totalling 16.75 inches (425.4 mm) over the previous five weeks, Perth's wayward kicking (3.12 to 3.3 at half-time) loses them a critical match and pushes them to fifth, where they would stay for the rest of the season.

=== Round 14 ===
	Round 14
Saturday, 29 July (2:45 pm)	Swan Districts 23.20 (158)	def.	West Perth 10.9 (69)	Bassendean Oval
Saturday, 29 July (2:45 pm)	East Perth 7.16 (58)	def. by	East Fremantle 10.11 (71)	Perth Oval
Saturday, 29 July (2:45 pm)	South Fremantle 15.14 (104)	def.	Subiaco 9.10 (64)	Fremantle Oval
Saturday, 29 July (2:45 pm)	Claremont 13.12 (90)	def.	Perth 11.8 (74)	Claremont Oval
For a second consecutive week, East Fremantle win a vital match through their opponent's inaccuracy, as East Perth kick 0.7 (7) to 3.1 (19) with the wind in the second quarter.; Perth's loss and South Fremantle's win leaves the Redlegs two games out of the four.; Despite continuing persistent rain, Swan Districts record what would remain their biggest open-age win until 1961 and their biggest over the Cardinals until 1975. Much-travelled forward Clem Rosewarne kicks eight.

=== Round 15 ===
	Round 15
Saturday, 5 August (2:45 pm)	South Fremantle 8.15 (63)	def. by	East Fremantle 14.20 (104)	Fremantle Oval (crowd: 6000)
Saturday, 5 August (2:45 pm)	Swan Districts 13.12 (90)	def. by	Claremont 18.8 (116)	Bassendean Oval
Saturday, 5 August (2:45 pm)	East Perth 18.16 (124)	def.	Subiaco 10.15 (75)	Perth Oval
Saturday, 5 August (2:45 pm)	West Perth 11.14 (80)	def. by	Perth 12.19 (91)	Leederville Oval

=== Round 16 ===
	Round 16
Saturday, 12 August (2:45 pm)	Swan Districts 14.14 (98)	def.	South Fremantle 12.14 (86)	Bassendean Oval
Saturday, 12 August (2:45 pm)	Perth 5.12 (42)	def. by	East Perth 12.22 (94)	WACA
Saturday, 12 August (2:45 pm)	Subiaco 12.15 (87)	def. by	West Perth 14.21 (105)	Subiaco Oval
Saturday, 12 August (2:45 pm)	East Fremantle 15.18 (108)	def.	Claremont 13.4 (82)	Fremantle Oval
West Perth record their first win since defeating Perth by 41 points on Foundation Day, 1938. With nine goals, Ted Tyson becomes the first WANFL player to kick one thousand goals and only the third in major Australian Rules leagues after Gordon Coventry and Ken Farmer. A subscription fund was opened for him following the accomplishment of this feat.

=== Round 17 ===
	Round 17
Saturday, 19 August (2:45 pm)	West Perth 8.4 (52)	def. by	East Perth 15.19 (109)	Leederville Oval
Saturday, 19 August (2:45 pm)	Claremont 13.12 (90)	def. by	South Fremantle 14.15 (99)	Claremont Oval
Saturday, 19 August (2:45 pm)	Subiaco 5.11 (41)	def. by	Perth 9.17 (71)	Subiaco Oval
Saturday, 19 August (2:45 pm)	East Fremantle 12.6 (78)	def.	Swan Districts 8.17 (65)	Fremantle Oval
South Fremantle hold fourth place by a game with a superb comeback in incessant heavy rain after being thirteen points down at half-time.; On a day that became extremely wet after quarter-time, Tyson in his 189th match is goalless for only the second time, and East Perth return to top position.

=== Round 18 ===
	Round 18
Saturday, 26 August (2:45 pm)	East Fremantle 11.22 (88)	def.	West Perth 6.8 (44)	Fremantle Oval
Saturday, 26 August (2:45 pm)	Claremont 17.17 (119)	def.	Subiaco 8.6 (54)	Claremont Oval
Saturday, 26 August (2:45 pm)	Perth 9.11 (65)	def.	South Fremantle 7.15 (57)	WACA
Saturday, 26 August (2:45 pm)	East Perth 9.15 (69)	def.	Swan Districts 6.3 (39)	Perth Oval
With a fighting win in shocking conditions, Perth recapture South Fremantle's place in the top four.

=== Round 19 ===
	Round 19
Saturday, 2 September (2:45 pm)	Swan Districts 10.7 (67)	def. by	Perth 15.6 (96)	Bassendean Oval
Saturday, 2 September (2:45 pm)	South Fremantle 16.12 (108)	def.	East Perth 12.13 (85)	Fremantle Oval
Saturday, 2 September (2:45 pm)	Subiaco 10.14 (74)	def. by	East Fremantle 15.14 (104)	Subiaco Oval
Saturday, 2 September (2:45 pm)	Claremont 29.19 (193)	def.	West Perth 14.10 (94)	Claremont Oval
South Fremantle’s win over East Perth, with Chandler returning to his 1938 form in front of goals, maintains their chance of a first finals berth since 1932.; Gook kicks his hundredth goal as Perth maintain by 1.4 percent their place in the top four.; Claremont kick the highest score in senior WANFL history to this point, beating East Fremantle's 28.23 (191) against South Fremantle in 1937.; The Tigers' 14.4 (88) in the third quarter was a record for any quarter in the WANFL to that point, and was not broken until 1953 in open-age competition.

=== Round 20 ===
	Round 20
Saturday, 9 September (2:45 pm)	West Perth 9.7 (61)	def. by	South Fremantle 20.28 (148)	Leederville Oval
Saturday, 9 September (2:45 pm)	East Perth 10.15 (75)	def. by	Claremont 13.9 (87)	Perth Oval
Saturday, 9 September (2:45 pm)	Perth 10.19 (79)	def.	East Fremantle 4.9 (33)	WACA
Saturday, 9 September (2:45 pm)	Swan Districts 21.10 (136)	def.	Subiaco 20.11 (131)	Bassendean Oval
South Fremantle's 10.10 (70) in the last quarter enables them to overtake Perth for the last place in the four. Tyson kicks eight of West's nine goals to finish two behind Gook – despite his club winning only one match.; Perth's speed and superb defence provide a gallant effort to hold fourth place that misses by 0.3 percent.; Against Claremont, East Perth fail to take advantage of East Fremantle's loss and miss the double chance by a game.

== Ladder ==
1939 WANFL ladder
Pos	Team	Pld	W	L	D	PF	PA	PP	Pts
1	Claremont (P)	20	16	4	0	2200	1625	135.4	64
2	East Fremantle	20	15	5	0	1990	1570	126.8	60
3	East Perth	20	14	6	0	1953	1509	129.4	56
4	South Fremantle	20	12	8	0	2039	1789	114.0	48
5	Perth	20	12	8	0	1750	1539	113.7	48
6	Swan Districts	20	7	13	0	1577	1886	83.6	28
7	Subiaco	20	3	17	0	1573	2149	73.2	12
8	West Perth	20	1	19	0	1474	2489	59.2	4

Rules for classification: 1) points; 2) percentage; 3) number of points for.
(P) Premiers

== Finals ==
=== First semi-final ===
	First semi-final
Saturday, 16 September (2:45 pm)	East Perth 17.10 (112)	def.	South Fremantle 14.9 (93)	Subiaco Oval (crowd: 11,006)
East Perth take advantage of a weakening wind in the last quarter to hold out South Fremantle in the latter’s first final for seven seasons.

=== Second semi-final ===
	Second semi-final
Saturday, 23 September (2:45 pm)	Claremont 9.14 (68)	def. by	East Fremantle 15.15 (105)	Subiaco Oval (crowd: 9,411)
East Fremantle, without several leading players, cause a surprise by convincingly beating a Claremont side weakened by the absence of George Moloney. The game is close for three quarters before Old Easts kick 7.1 (43) to 1.7 (13) in the last quarter amid expectations they would tire.

=== Preliminary final ===
	Preliminary final
Saturday, 30 September (2:45 pm)	Claremont 10.17 (77)	def.	East Perth 11.5 (71)	Subiaco Oval
A vicious game with two reports comes alive in the last quarter, sees Claremont fight back to win narrowly.

== Grand final ==
1939 WANFL Grand Final
Saturday, 7 October (2:45 pm)	East Fremantle	def. by	Claremont	Subiaco Oval
5.4 (34); 7.7 (49); 10.8 (68); 11.10 (76)	Q1; Q2; Q3; Final	2.2 (14); 8.7 (55); 12.10 (82); 14.11 (95)	Umpires: George Owens
George Doig 6, Sanford, McGlinn, Wendt, Ebbs, Kingsbury	Goals	Heusler 3, Baker 3, Bermingham 2, George Moloney 2, Hooper 2, Gibson, Reeves
Seubert, George Doig, Sanford, Jack Clark, McGlinn, Briggs	Best	O‘Neill (best on ground), Heusler, Sammy Clarke, Julian, Reeves, Kenworthy
Injuries	Serjeant (broken jaw); Lovegrove (ankle)
Despite the absence of Compton (suspended), Reid and Edmeades, and injuries to skipper George Moloney and Lovegrove, Claremont convincingly win their second premiership with a brilliant third quarter into the wind.
