= Shane Beros =

Australian rules footballer

Personal information
- Full name: Shane Leon Beros
- Born: 22 October 1973 (age 53); Perth, Western Australia
- Original team: West Coast Cowan (WAAFL)
- Height: 173 cm (5 ft 8 in)
- Weight: 77 kg (170 lb)
- Position: Rover

Playing career
Years	Club	Games (Goals)
1998–2008	Swan Districts	193 (111)

Representative team honours
Years	Team	Games (Goals)
2003–06	Western Australia	4 (1)

Career highlights
- Sandover Medal 2003; Swan Medal 2003, 2005, 2006; Swan Districts captain 2004–07; Runner-up Sandover Medal 2004; WAFL state team representative 2003, 2004, 2005, 2006

Shane Leon Beros (born 22 October 1973, in Perth, Western Australia) is a former Australian rules footballer who played for Swan Districts in the West Australian Football League (WAFL) from 1998 to 2008. He was the winner of the 2003 Sandover Medal.

== Career ==
Beros was recruited from West Coast Cowan in the Western Australian Amateur Football League (WAAFL). He made his debut for Swan Districts in 1998, playing 18 games and kicking 11 goals. He played consistently for Swans at WAFL level, and had a break-out season in 2003, winning both the Swan Medal as Swan Districts' best and fairest and the Sandover Medal for the best player in the competition, at the age of 29. He was named captain of Swan Districts in 2004, a position which he held until 2007, and was again amongst the best players in the competition, finishing runner-up in the Sandover Medal. He won two further Swan Medals, in 2005 and 2006, playing mainly as a back pocket, before retiring at the end of the 2008 season at the age of 35.
