= 1954 SAAFL season =

1954 premiership season
- Date: 24 April - 18 September
- Premiers: A1: University; A2: Henley; A3: Woodville B A4: Henley B Colts: Woodville
- Minor premiers: A1: University; A2: Henley; A3: Woodville B A4: Henley B Colts: Woodville
- Wooden spooners: A1: Prince Alfred O.C. A2: Teachers' College; A3: Semaphore Central B A4: Prince Alfred O.C. Colts: Henley
- Best and fairest: A1 (Hone Medal): Jim Farr (Rosewater); A2 (Chambers Medal): Lance Poulton (Kenilworth); A3 (McKay Medal): Max 'Moggie' Myers (Myer); A4 (Treloar Medal): Tom Jeffree (Henley B); Colts (Nazer Medal): Bob Morrell (Woodville); War Memorial Medal: Geoff Krieger (University)
- Leading goalkicker: A1: Charley Irvine (Semaphore Central) 67 goals A2: Graham Nash (Payneham) 118 goals

The 1954 SAAFL season was the 36th season of the South Australian Amateur Football League (SAAFL).

The season commenced on 24 April and concluded on 18 September.

The Colts qualification was changed from under 17 on 1 July to under 17 as at 1 January. North Brighton-Somerton left the Amateur League.

== A1 ==
=== Ladder ===
| Pos | Team | Pld | W | L | D | PF | PA | Pts |
|---|---|---|---|---|---|---|---|---|
| 1 | University | 18 | 16 | 2 | 0 | 2022 | 1053 | 32 |
| 2 | Walkerville | 18 | 16 | 2 | 0 | 1606 | 1162 | 32 |
| 3 | Semaphore Central | 18 | 14 | 4 | 0 | 1630 | 1125 | 28 |
| 4 | Rosewater | 18 | 10 | 7 | 1 | 1347 | 1227 | 21 |
| 5 | Flinders Park | 18 | 7 | 10 | 1 | 1346 | 1693 | 15 |
| 6 | Exeter | 18 | 7 | 11 | 0 | 1494 | 1565 | 14 |
| 7 | Woodville | 18 | 7 | 11 | 0 | 1384 | 1551 | 14 |
| 8 | St. Peter's O.C. | 18 | 5 | 12 | 1 | 1249 | 1332 | 11 |
| 9 | Alberton Church United | 18 | 5 | 13 | 0 | 1210 | 1733 | 10 |
| 10 | Prince Alfred O.C. | 18 | 1 | 16 | 1 | 971 | 1818 | 3 |

=== Finals ===
==== Semi Finals ====
| | Semi-finals |
| Saturday, 4 September | University 11.13 (79) | def. | Semaphore Central 10.17 (77) | Payneham Oval |
| Saturday, 4 September | Walkerville 12.5 (77) | def. by | Rosewater 12.10 (82) | Woodville Oval |

==== Final ====
Saturday, 11 September | University | def. | Rosewater | Alberton Oval
2.2; 8.5; 11.8; 19.11 (125) | Q1; Q2; Q3; Final | 3.2; 6.3; 7.4; 10.4 (64) | Umpires: P.K. Russell
Krieger 6, Martin 5, Pay Poy 4, Walsh 2, McLeod, Clayton | Goals | Blackwell 4, Shield 2, Brice 2, Farr, Crichton
Martin, McLeod, Fitch Bishop, Altmen, Pay Poy, Johnson, Krieger | Best | Pedersen, Christensen, Tyler, Beer, Gregg, Leonard

== A2 ==
=== Ladder ===
| Pos | Team | Pld | W | L | D | PF | PA | Pts |
|---|---|---|---|---|---|---|---|---|
| 1 | Henley | 18 | 17 | 1 | 0 | | | 34 |
| 2 | Payneham | 18 | 15 | 3 | 0 | | | 30 |
| 3 | Colonel Light Gardens | 18 | 11 | 6 | 1 | | | 23 |
| 4 | Kenilworth | 18 | 10 | 8 | 0 | | | 20 |
| 5 | Riverside | 18 | 9 | 9 | 0 | | | 18 |
| 6 | Goodwood | 18 | 9 | 9 | 0 | | | 18 |
| 7 | King's O.C. | 18 | 8 | 10 | 0 | | | 16 |
| 8 | University B | 18 | 6 | 11 | 1 | | | 13 |
| 9 | Railways' Institute | 18 | 3 | 15 | 0 | | | 6 |
| 10 | Teachers' College | 18 | 1 | 17 | 0 | | | 2 |

=== Finals ===
==== Semi Finals ====
| | Semi-finals |
| Saturday, 4 September | Henley 10.19 (79) | def. | Colonel Light Gardens 3.8 (26) | Goodwood Oval |
| Saturday, 4 September | Payneham 8.19 (67) | def. by | Kenilworth 10.11 (71) | Railways' Oval |

==== Final ====
Saturday, 11 September | Henley | def. | Kenilworth | Payneham Oval
12.13 (85) | Q1; Q2; Q3; Final | 12.7 (79) | Umpires: J.A. Fraser
Ardill, Gluyas, Prior | Best

== A3 ==
=== Ladder ===
| Pos | Team | Pld | W | L | D | PF | PA | Pts |
|---|---|---|---|---|---|---|---|---|
| 1 | Woodville B | 18 | 16 | 2 | 0 | | | 32 |
| 2 | Birkenhead Sports | 18 | 15 | 3 | 0 | | | 30 |
| 3 | Myer | 18 | 12 | 6 | 0 | | | 24 |
| 4 | Exeter B | 18 | 11 | 7 | 0 | | | 22 |
| 5 | University C | 18 | 10 | 8 | 0 | | | 20 |
| 6 | Commonwealth Bank | 18 | 10 | 8 | 0 | | | 20 |
| 7 | St. Peter's O.C. B | 18 | 7 | 11 | 0 | | | 14 |
| 8 | Semaphore Park | 18 | 5 | 13 | 0 | | | 10 |
| 9 | Old Scotch | 18 | 4 | 14 | 0 | | | 8 |
| 10 | Semaphore Central B | 18 | 0 | 18 | 0 | | | 0 |

=== Finals ===
==== Semi Finals ====
| | Semi-finals |
| Saturday, 4 September | Woodville B 9.7 (61) | def. by | Myer 9.16 (73) | Largs Oval |
| Saturday, 4 September | Birkenhead Sports 6.11 (47) | def. by | Exeter B 7.10 (52) | Teachers' College Oval |

==== Final ====
Saturday, 11 September | Myer | def. by | Exeter B | Walkerville Oval
4.9 (33) | Q1; Q2; Q3; Final | 11.6 (72) | Umpires: R.C. Hartland

==== Challenge Final ====
Saturday, 18 September | Woodville B | def. | Exeter B | Alberton Oval
3.10 (28) | Q1; Q2; Q3; Final | 3.6 (24) | Umpires: J.A. Fraser

== A4 ==
=== Ladder ===
| Pos | Team | Pld | W | L | D | PF | PA | Pts |
|---|---|---|---|---|---|---|---|---|
| 1 | Henley B | 18 | | | | | | 33 |
| 2 | Payneham B | 18 | | | | | | 30 |
| 3 | Pulteney O.S. | 18 | | | | | | 28 |
| 4 | Long Range Weapons | 18 | | | | | | 27 |
| 5 | Goodwood B | 18 | | | | | | 22 |
| 6 | Kenilworth B | 18 | | | | | | 14 |
| 7 | Colonel Light Gardens B | 18 | | | | | | 10 |
| 8 | Teachers' College B | 18 | | | | | | 6 |
| 9 | Rosewater B | 18 | | | | | | 6 |
| 10 | Prince Alfred O.C. B | 18 | | | | | | 4 |

=== Finals ===
==== Semi Finals ====
| | Semi-finals |
| Saturday, 4 September | Henley B 13.11 (89) | def. | Pulteney O.S. 10.6 (66) | Walkerville Oval |
| Saturday, 4 September | Payneham B 11.12 (78) | def. | Long Range Weapons 7.5 (47) | Myer Oval |

==== Final ====
Saturday, 11 September | Henley B | def. by | Payneham B | Myer Oval
5.13 (43) | Q1; Q2; Q3; Final | 13.12 (90)

==== Challenge Final ====
Saturday, 18 September | Henley B | def. | Payneham B | Goodwood Oval
11.11 (77) | Q1; Q2; Q3; Final | 10.8 (68) | Umpires: F.K. Russell

== Colts U17 ==
=== Ladder ===
| Pos | Team | Pld | W | L | D | PF | PA | Pts |
|---|---|---|---|---|---|---|---|---|
| 1 | Woodville | 12 | | | | | | 24 |
| 2 | Payneham | 12 | | | | | | 18 |
| 3 | Flinders Park | 12 | | | | | | 18 |
| 4 | Colonel Light Gardens | 12 | | | | | | 12 |
| 5 | Adelaide | 12 | | | | | | 6 |
| 6 | Goodwood | 12 | | | | | | 6 |
| 7 | Henley | 12 | | | | | | 0 |

=== Finals ===
==== Semi Finals ====
| | Semi-finals |
| Saturday, 14 August (1:00pm) | Woodville 7.5 (47) | def. by | Flinders Park 8.4 (52) | Henley Oval |
| Saturday, 14 August (1:00pm) | Payneham 10.16 (76) | def. | Colonel Light Gardens 8.6 (54) | Goodwood Oval |

==== Final ====
Saturday, 21 August | Payneham | def. by | Flinders Park | Goodwood Oval
8.4 (52) | Q1; Q2; Q3; Final | 8.5 (53)

==== Challenge Final ====
Saturday, 28 August (1:00pm) | Woodville | def. | Flinder Park | Goodwood Oval
10.15 (75) | Q1; Q2; Q3; Final | 7.9 (51)

== Representative ==
=== vs VAFA ===
Monday 14th June

SAAFL
| B: | P. Harbinson (St. Peter's O.C.) | D. Fletcher (Semaphore Central) vice capt. | I. McDonald (Semaphore Central) |
| HB: | R. Tuckwell (University) | K. Simmons (Semaphore Central) | M. Natt (Exeter) |
| C: | R. Johnson (University) | J. Sawford (Semaphore Central) | D. Parkinson (King's O.C.) |
| HF: | C. Jarratt (Walkerville) | A. McLeod (University) capt. | D. Davies (Prince Alfred O.C.) |
| F: | G. Krieger (University) | C. Akkermans (University) | C. Gross (Walkerville) |
| Foll: | J. Walsh (University) | K. Wilkinson (Walkerville) | J. Martin (University) |
| Res: | J. Delo (Walkerville) | L. Gregory (St. Peter's O.C.) | |

Queen's Birthday
Monday, 14 June (2:30pm) | V.A.F.A. | def. | S.A.A.F.L. | St. Kilda Cricket Ground (crowd: 1,500)
0.0 (0); 5.9 (39); 6.10 (46); 12.14 (86) | Q1; Q2; Q3; Final | 1.11 (17); 2.12 (24); 9.15 (69); 10.15 (75) | Umpires: Wenker
Anderson 5, Tunbridge 2, Allsop 2, McLachlin, Bishop, Empey | Goals | Walsh 3, Davies 2, McLeod 2, Gregory, Gross, Wilkinson
Hawes, Collopy, Bishop, Anderson, Allsop, Empey | Best | Wilkinson, Fletcher, Sawford, Gross, Tuckwell, Walsh, Simmons

=== vs WAAFA ===
Saturday 31st July

SAAFL
| B: | D. Fletcher (Semaphore Central) vice capt. | B. Edwards (Walkerville) | C. Jacquier (Exeter) |
| HB: | M. Myers (Myer) | K. Simmons (Semaphore Central) | M. Natt (Exeter) capt. |
| C: | K. Caire (Woodville) | R. Saul (Walkerville) | K. Fitch (University) |
| HF: | C. Jarratt (Walkerville) | D. Koch (Semaphore Central) | P. Hill (Prince Alfred O.C.) |
| F: | B. Miatke (Walkerville) | C. Irvine (Semaphore Central) | B. Thomas (Myer) |
| Foll: | L. Gregory (St. Peter's O.C.) | I. McDonald (Semaphore Central) | R. Shields (Rosewater) |
| Res: | D. Parkinson (King's O.C.) | L. Poulton (Kenilworth) | |

Saturday, 31 July | W.A.A.F.A. | def. | S.A.A.F.L. | East Fremantle Oval
4.0 (24); 8.3 (51); 13.7 (85); 17.8 (110) | Q1; Q2; Q3; Final | 0.1 (1); 1.5 (11); 1.10 (16); 7.10 (52)
Gill 8, Taranto 3, Caporn 2, Okely 2, Andrews, Backshaw | Goals | Irvine 2, Fletcher, Jacquier, Jarratt, McDonald, Thomas
Shaw, Gaunt, Taranto, Caporn, Gill | Best | Simmons, Myers, Jarrett, Jacquier, Thomas, Gregory, Irvine
