= Mick Grasso =

Australian rules footballer

Personal information
- Full name: Domenico Grasso
- Born: 23 December 1966 (age 59); Bunbury, Western Australia
- Original team: Marist JFC
- Position: Utility

Playing career^{1}
| Years | Club | Games (Goals) |
| 1987–92 | Swan Districts | 93 (37) |
- ^{1} Playing statistics correct to the end of 1992.

Career highlights
- Swan Districts best and fairest 1988 & 1990; Sandover Medal 1990; Swan Districts premiership side 1990

Domenico "Mick" Grasso (born 23 December 1966) is a former Australian rules footballer who played for Swan Districts in the West Australian Football League (WAFL). Originally from Bunbury, Western Australia, Grasso began his career with the South Bunbury Football Club in the South West Football League (SWFL). Recruited by Swan Districts prior to the start of the 1987 season, he made his debut for the club in round one. Grasso won a club best and fairest award in 1988 & 1990 as well as the 1990 Sandover Medal as the best player in the competition. Injuries forced his retirement from the WAFL in 1992, although he remained involved in country football afterwards, in both playing and coaching roles.

== Career ==
Grasso was born in Bunbury, Western Australia, and began playing football for the Marist Junior Football Club. He made his debut for the South Bunbury Football Club in the South West Football League (SWFL) at the age of 16, and played in premierships in his first two seasons. The coach of Swan Districts, John Todd, visited Bunbury at the end of the 1986 season, inviting Grasso to try out for the club. He made his senior debut in round one of the 1987 season, having already impressed during the WAFL's pre-season tournament. Grasso continued to live in Bunbury during his first two seasons in the league, travelling to Perth each weekend to play in the WAFL. In 1990, after the return of Todd as coach, Swan Districts won the premiership, with Grasso winning the best and fairest, as well as the Sandover Medal for the best player in the competition. In the second match of the following season, Grasso had his foot after Perth's Scott Spalding landed on his leg, sidelining him for most of the season. Grasso returned to the side for the semi-final and preliminary final, kicking seven goals in the latter game after being named in a forward pocket. He retired at the end of the 1992 season after again struggling with Achilles tendon and hamstring injuries. Grasso returned to play with South Bunbury the following season, and later accepted a role as captain-coach of the West Arthur team in the Upper Great Southern Football League (UGSFL). During this time, he captained a West Australian Country Football League representative side at the national country football championships, and was named in the country all-Australian team. Grasso was appointed coach of South Bunbury for the 2011 season, having previously served as an assistant coach. He was terminated from the position at the end of the following season, despite having coached the side to a grand final.
