= Sammy Clarke =

Australian rules footballer

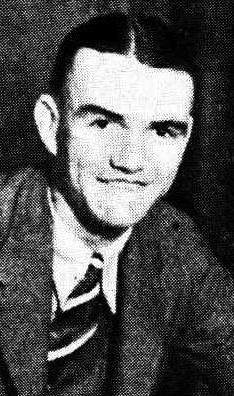

Personal information
- Full name: Sydney Campbell Clarke
- Born: 5 April 1914; West Midland, Western Australia
- Died: 24 January 1945 (aged 30) near Tadji, Territory of New Guinea
- Original team: Hale School
- Height: 187 cm (6 ft 2 in)
- Positions: Centre half-back, half-back flanker

Playing career
Years	Club	Games (Goals)
1933–1941	Claremont	133 (6)

Representative team honours
Years	Team	Games (Goals)
1934–1937	Western Australia	8 (0)

Career highlights
- Sandover Medal 1933, 1934; Claremont premiership side 1939; West Australian Football Hall of Fame (inducted 2005); Western Australian Hall of Champions (inducted 2009)

Sydney Campbell "Sammy" Clarke (5 April 1914 – 24 January 1945) was an Australian rules footballer who played for Claremont in the Western Australian National Football League (WANFL) between 1933 and 1941. He won the Sandover Medal in his first two seasons in the competition, making him the first player to win the award in consecutive years. Clarke won a premiership with Claremont in 1939, and also represented Western Australia in eight interstate games. He served as a pilot with the Royal Australian Air Force (RAAF) during World War II, but was killed in action in New Guinea towards the end of the war.

== Early life ==
Clarke was born in West Midland, Western Australia, on 5 April 1914. His father, Sydney Clarke Sr., played football for West Adelaide in the South Australian Football Association (SAFA) and Railways in the Goldfields Football Association (GFA). Clarke attended Perth Boys' School and Hale School, and captained the Western Australian schoolboys' side at the 1928 National Carnival in Brisbane, and Hale School's First XVIII in 1930. Clarke played for the Pastimes Football Club (now the Carey Park Football Club) in the Bunbury district football competition in 1931, before returning to Perth in 1932 to play for Nedlands in the Metropolitan Junior Football Association. He captained the club to the 1932 premiership, and also won the Strempel Medal for the best player in that competition.

== WANFL career ==
Clarke was recruited to Claremont-Cottesloe for the 1933 season, having been considered one of the best juniors in Western Australia the previous season. Clarke had an outstanding season, winning the Sandover Medal for the fairest and best player in the competition, despite his club winning the wooden spoon that season. He again won the medal in 1934, becoming the first back-to-back winner of the award. He missed the 1938 premiership win while undergoing training in England with the Royal Air Force (RAF), having worked his way overseas and back on a freighter.

During the 1939 season, Clarke played in Claremont's premiership-winning team and also played his 100th game for the club. In the off-season, he purchased a mercery business in Busselton, and thus did not play in the WANFL in 1940. He returned to Perth prior to the beginning of the 1941 season, with Claremont enlisting his services for one final season. Clarke finished his WANFL career with 133 games and six goals. He also represented Western Australia in eight interstate matches, captaining the side against South Australia at Leederville Oval in 1934 and playing in the 1937 Australian National Football Carnival, which Perth hosted.

== Military career and death ==
Clarke enlisted in the Royal Australian Air Force in July 1942, and was posted to the No. 8 Squadron as a flying officer. In January 1945, Clarke was the pilot of a Bristol Beaufort (serial number A9-630), with three other crew on board, which was presumed missing after failing to return from an anti-submarine sweep, his first active mission, near Tadji in the Territory of New Guinea. Clarke's name is featured on the War Memorial in Lae. In 1952, the Claremont Football Club established the Sammy Clarke Memorial Medal for the best player in the under-15 district football competition. Clarke was inducted into the West Australian Football Hall of Fame in 2005, and into the Western Australian Hall of Champions in 2009.
