= Peter Spencer (footballer) =

Australian rules footballer (born 1956)

Personal information
- Full name: Peter James Spencer
- Born: 11 January 1956 (age 70); Subiaco, Western Australia
- Height: 177 cm (5 ft 10 in)
- Weight: 75 kg (165 lb)

Playing career^{1}
Years	Club	Games (Goals)
1974–1980, 1983–84, 1987	East Perth	185 (322)
1981–1982	North Melbourne	24 (32)
1985-1986	Subiaco	21 (47)
1986	Claremont	2 (4)

Representative team honours
Years	Team	Games (Goals)
1976–1982	Western Australia	7 (11)
- ^{1} Playing statistics correct to the end of 1987.

Career highlights
- Sandover Medal – 1976, 1984

Peter Spencer (born 11 January 1956) is a former Australian rules footballer who played for the East Perth Football Club in the West Australian Football League (WAFL) and North Melbourne in the Victorian Football League (VFL). He is a dual Sandover Medallist, winning the award in 1976 and 1984 and a triple F. D. Book Medallist (best and fairest at East Perth), winning the award in 1975, 1976 and 1984.

He played for Western Australia in the 1979 Perth State of Origin Carnival, before moving to Victoria to play for the Kangaroos in 1981 and 1982. His first season in the VFL was impressive, playing nineteen games and kicking the third most goals for the Kangaroos with 26, but injuries restricted him to only five games in 1982.

Spencer returned to Western Australia in 1983, but after two seasons with East Perth switched to Subiaco. After 21 games with the Lions it was clear his style was antagonistic to the philosophies of coach Bunton, and Spencer applied along with Derek Kickett for a clearance to Claremont. At first the WAFL denied these applications, but on 21 May Spencer won his clearance – though he was recruited mainly to stiffen Claremont's reserves and played only two senior matches for the Tigers.

In 1987 he had one last season with the Royals, but injuries meant he had to play with headgear and padding all through – though he retired on a high note with a best afield effort as the Royals avoided the wooden spoon by downing East Fremantle.

He was inducted into the West Australian Football Hall of Fame in 2007.

He is the son of former East Perth player Jim Spencer and is currently a sports commentator with the ABC. He is an old boy of Aquinas College, Perth.
