= Sandover Medal =

Australian rules football award in West Australian Football League

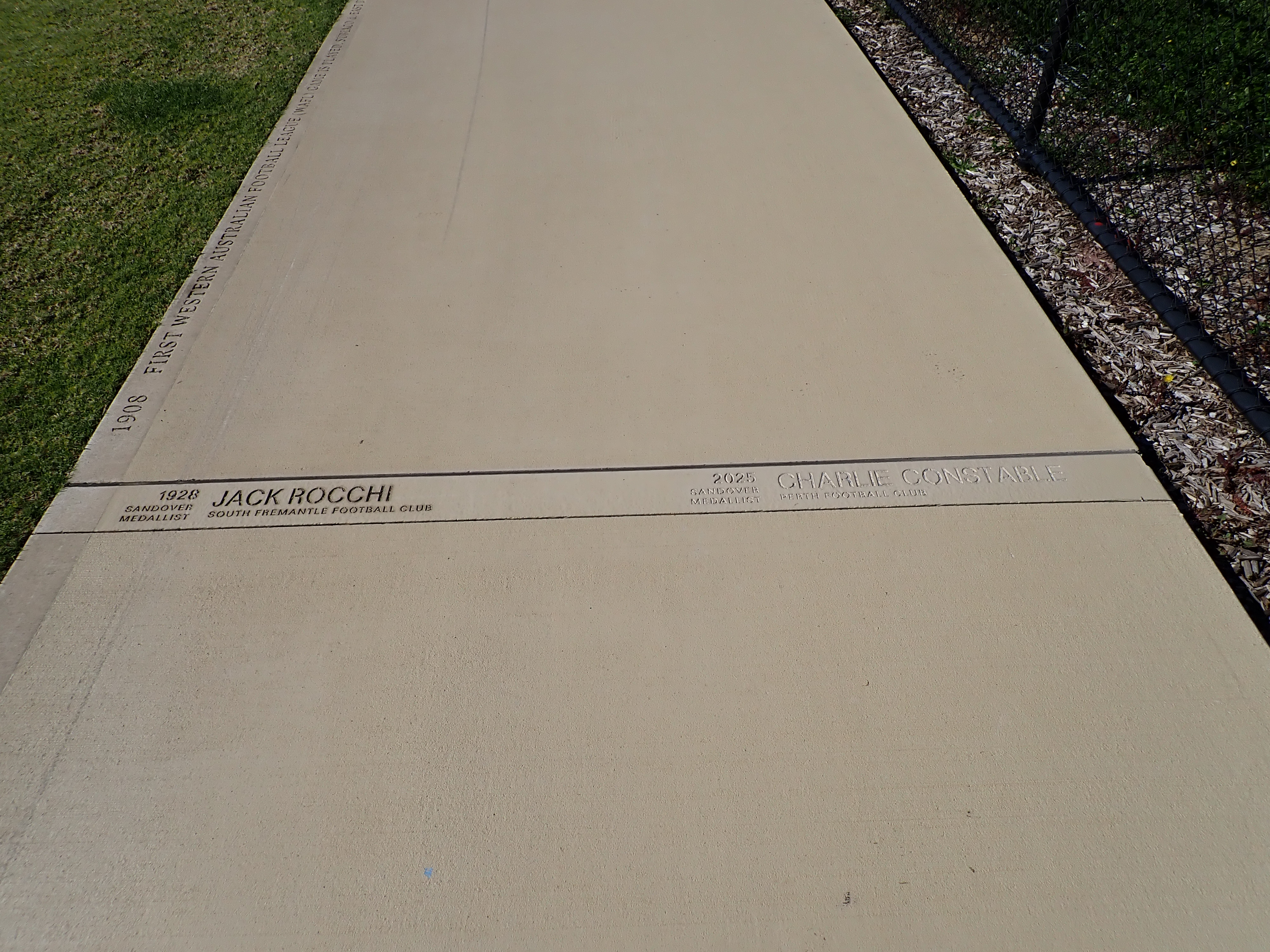
The Sandover Medal Walk at Subiaco Oval: The 1928 and 2025 entries

The Sandover Medal is an Australian rules football award, given annually since 1921 to the fairest and best player in the West Australian Football League. The award was donated by Alfred Sandover M.B.E., a prominent Perth hardware merchant and benefactor.

== Voting system ==
After each match, the three field umpires (those umpires who control the flow of the game) confer and award a 3, 2 and 1 point vote to the players they regard as the best, second best, and third best in the match respectively. Voting wasn't always done this way. From 1985-2018, 5, 4, 3, 2 and 1 point votes were given, from 1930–1984, 3, 2 and 1 point votes were given, and prior to 1930 there was only one vote per game.

Just like similar "fairest and best" awards, for example the Brownlow and Magarey Medals, if a player is suspended for a reportable offence throughout the season then they become ineligible to win the award. This in effect is where the "fairest" element of the award comes in.

On the awards night, the votes over the home and away (regular) season are tallied and the eligible player with the highest number of votes is awarded the medal. In the past, ties were decided on a countback system, but after a three-way tie in the 1984 count, the WAFC decided to scrap countback system and award multiple medals to joint winners.

Prior to 1930 when only 1 vote per game was given, and hence a countback was not possible, the WAFL president would cast a deciding vote to decide the winner.

Players that had missed out on a medal due to the countback system were awarded them retrospectively in 1997.

== Sandover Medal winners ==
Year	Player	Team	Votes
1921	Cyril Hoft **	Perth	–
1921	Tom Outridge	Subiaco	–
1922	Harold Boyd	West Perth	6
1923	William "Digger" Thomas	East Perth	–
1924	Jim Gosnell	West Perth	–
1925	George Owens	East Perth	4
1926	Johnny Leonard	Subiaco	6
1927	Jim Craig	West Perth	7
1928	Jack Rocchi	South Fremantle	5
1929	Johnny Leonard **	Subiaco	5
1929	Billy Thomas	East Perth	5
1930	Ted Flemming	West Perth	23 †
1931	Lin Richards	East Fremantle	34
1932	Keith Hough	Claremont-Cottesloe	32
1933	Sammy Clarke	Claremont-Cottesloe	15
1934	Sammy Clarke	Claremont-Cottesloe	24
1935	Lou Daily	Subiaco	25
1935	George Krepp	Swan Districts	25
1936	George Moloney	Claremont	30
1937	Frank Jenkins	South Fremantle	34
1938	Haydn Bunton, Sr.	Subiaco	27
1939	Haydn Bunton, Sr.	Subiaco	20
1940	Ed O'Keefe	West Perth	29
1941	Haydn Bunton, Sr.	Subiaco	22
1942	Laurie Bowen	West Perth	13
1943	Terry Moriarty	Perth	28
1944	Jim Davies	Swan Districts	33
1945	George Bailey	Perth	24
1946	John Loughridge	West Perth	26
1947	Clive Lewington	South Fremantle	22
1948	Merv McIntosh	Perth	22
1949	Gordon Maffina	Claremont	17
1950	Frank Allen **	East Perth	23
1950	Jim Conway	East Fremantle	23
1951	Fred Buttsworth	West Perth	25
1952	Steve Marsh	South Fremantle	20
1953	Merv McIntosh	Perth	14
1954	Merv McIntosh	Perth	22
1955	John Todd	South Fremantle	25
1956	Graham Farmer	East Perth	15
1957	Jack Clarke	East Fremantle	19
1957	Graham Farmer **	East Perth	19
1958	Ted Kilmurray	East Perth	20
1959	Brian Foley	West Perth	24
1960	Graham Farmer	East Perth	26
1961	Neville Beard	Perth	22
1961	Ray Sorrell **	East Fremantle	22
1962	Haydn Bunton, Jr.	Swan Districts	22
1963	Ray Sorrell	East Fremantle	20
1964	Barry Cable	Perth	23
1965	Bill Walker	Swan Districts	24
1966	Bill Walker	Swan Districts	20
1967	John Parkinson	Claremont	19
1967	Bill Walker	Swan Districts	19
1968	Barry Cable	Perth	25
1969	Mal Brown	East Perth	21
1970	Pat Dalton	Perth	17
1970	Bill Walker **	Swan Districts	17
1971	David Hollins	East Fremantle	26
1972	Ian Miller	Perth	20
1973	Barry Cable	Perth	25
1974	Graham Melrose	East Fremantle	20
1975	Alan Quartermaine	East Perth	16
1976	Peter Spencer	East Perth	21
1977	Brian Peake	East Fremantle	24
1978	Phil Kelly	East Perth	26
1979	Phil Kelly	East Perth	24
1980	Stephen Michael	South Fremantle	24
1981	Stephen Michael	South Fremantle	37
1982	Phil Narkle	Swan Districts	19
1983	Bryan Cousins **	Perth	16
1983	John Ironmonger	East Perth	16
1984	Steve Malaxos	Claremont	17
1984	Michael Mitchell	Claremont	17
1984	Peter Spencer	East Perth	17
1985	Murray Wrensted	East Fremantle	46 †
1986	Mark Bairstow	South Fremantle	39
1987	Mark Watson ‡	Perth	30
1988	David Bain	East Perth	42
1989	Craig Edwards	South Fremantle	39
1990	Mick Grasso	Swan Districts	36
1991	Ian Dargie	Subiaco	34
1992	Robbie West	West Perth	32
1993	Neil Mildenhall	West Perth	38
1994	Ian Dargie	Subiaco	34
1995	Craig Treleven	East Fremantle	43
1996	Jeremy Wasley	Swan Districts	37
1997	Brady Anderson	East Perth	30
1998	Adrian Bromage	East Fremantle	32
1999	Gus Seebeck	Perth	33
2000	Richard Ambrose	Subiaco	34
2001	Ryan Turnbull	East Perth	31
2002	Allistair Pickett	Peel Thunder	33
2003	Shane Beros	Swan Districts	39
2004	Allistair Pickett	Subiaco	42
2005	Jaxon Crabb	Claremont	39
2005	Toby McGrath	South Fremantle	39
2006	Matt Priddis	Subiaco	58
2007	Anthony Jones	Claremont	29
2008	Hayden Ballantyne	Peel Thunder	42
2009	Ross Young	Perth	45
2010	Andrew Krakouer	Swan Districts	44
2011	Luke Blackwell	Claremont	42
2012	Kane Mitchell	Claremont	58
2013	Rory O'Brien	East Fremantle	55
2014	Aaron Black	West Perth	47
2015	Aidan Tropiano	Perth	45
2016	Jye Bolton	Claremont	49
2017	Haiden Schloithe	South Fremantle	52
2018	Jye Bolton	Claremont	52
2019	Lachlan Delahunty	Subiaco	28 †
2020	Sam Fisher	Swan Districts	13 §
2021	Bailey Rogers	Claremont	30
2022	Blaine Boekhorst	East Fremantle	25
2023	Hamish Brayshaw	East Perth	26
2024	Callan England	Claremont	19
2024	Nik Rokahr	Swan Districts	19
2025	Charlie Constable	Perth	29
2026	Jake Florenca	South Fremantle	27

  - Awarded retrospective Sandover Medal in 1997

† Voting system changed from a single vote per game to 3-2-1 voting in 1930, then to 5-4-3-2-1 voting in 1985, and back to 3-2-1 voting in 2019

‡ In 1987, Derek Kickett (Claremont) polled 46 votes, but was ineligible to win due to suspension.

§ Due to the COVID-19 pandemic, a shortened 10 game season was played

== Multiple winners ==
The following players have won the Sandover Medal multiple times.

Medals	Player	Team	Seasons
4	Bill Walker	Swan Districts	1965, 1966, 1967, 1970
3	Haydn Bunton, Sr.	Subiaco	1938, 1939, 1941
3	Merv McIntosh	Perth	1948, 1953, 1954
3	Graham Farmer	East Perth	1956, 1957, 1960
3	Barry Cable	Perth	1964, 1968, 1973
2	Johnny Leonard	Subiaco	1926, 1929
2	Sammy Clarke	Claremont	1933, 1934
2	Ray Sorrell	East Fremantle	1961, 1963
2	Phil Kelly	East Perth	1978, 1979
2	Stephen Michael	South Fremantle	1980, 1981
2	Peter Spencer	East Perth	1976, 1984
2	Ian Dargie	Subiaco	1991, 1994
2	Allistair Pickett	Peel Thunder / Subiaco	2002, 2004
2	Jye Bolton	Claremont	2016, 2018

Haydn Bunton Sr. (1938, 1939, 1941) and Matt Priddis (2005) are Sandover Medallists who have also won a Brownlow Medal as best and fairest players in AFL/VFL competition.

Nick Rohkar (2024) is the only Sandover Medallist who has also won a Magarey Medal (2026) as the best and fairest player in the SANFL competition.
