= Perth Football League =

Australian rules football competition in Perth, Western Australia

- Current season, competition or edition: 2026
- Formerly: Mercantile Football Association (1922–1923); Perth Districts Football Association (1924–1928); Western Australian Amateur Football Association (1929–1970); Western Australian Amateur Football League (1971–2018)
- Sport: Australian rules football
- Founded: 1922
- President: Geoff Glass
- No. of teams: 75
- Country: Australia
- Most recent champion: North Beach (A Grade) (2026)
- Most titles: University (96)
- Sponsors: WAFC, Carlton United Breweries, Budget Car and Truck Rental, Burley, West Coast Eagles, Electrical Group Training, Belgravia Apparel, Victor School and Sports Club Supplies, Life Without Barriers, For My Sisters, NAB, WA Return Recycle Renew, Sullivan Logistics, Business News, SEN WA, SKG Radiology
- Feeder to: WAFL, WAFLW AFL, AFLW
- Related competitions: Metro Football League
- Website: PerthFootball.com.au

The Perth Football League is an Australian rules football competition based in Perth, Western Australia. It is the largest community Australian rules football competition in Western Australia.

== History ==
The competition began in 1922 with five teams as the Mercantile Football Association (MFA). The MFA changed its name in 1924 to the Perth Districts Football Association and then, in 1929, to the Western Australian Amateur Football Association. It changed to Western Australian Amateur Football League (WAAFL) in 1971. In 2019, the league rebranded as the Perth Football League. University are the most successful club, with 20 A-grade premierships and 96 overall, as of the conclusion of the 2020 season.

The league continues to grow with new clubs joining in most years, and an A Reserves added to the women's competition for 2024.

== Clubs ==
=== Locations ===
Colours indicate club's highest level of competition
Red = A Grade
Orange= B Grade
Yellow = C1
Green = C2
Light blue = C3
Blue = C4
Pink = C5
Black = E grade
Brown = Colts only
Purple = Women only

=== Current ===
Club	Colours	Nickname	Home Ground	Men's Grades	Women's Grades	Former League	Est.	Years in PFL	PFL Senior Premierships	
Club	Colours	Nickname	Home Ground	Men's Grades	Women's Grades	Former League	Est.	Years in PFL	Total	Most Recent
Armadale		Demons	Gwynne Park, Armadale	E1 South		PFL	1909	2010-	0	-
Baldivis		Brumbies	Baldivis Sports Complex, Baldivis	A, AR, C5, C5R, E2 South, PSC, WCC	A, AR	PFL	2005	2021-	1	2021
Ballajura		Royals	Kingfisher Oval, Ballajura	C2, C2R, E2 North	C1	WAFA	1995	2002-	3	2023
Bassendean (Ashfield 1973-77, Ashfield-Bassendean 1978-82)		Swans	Jubilee Reserve, Eden Hill	C2, C2R, LKC		–	1973	1973-	5	2019
Bayswater		Blues	Hillcrest Reserve, Bayswater	C5, C5R	C1, C4	WAFA	1946	1946-2004, 2009-	5	1988
Belmont Districts (Belmont-Redcliffe 1999-2004)		Bombers	Forster Park, Cloverdale	C2, C2R, E2 South		–	1999	1999-	4	2023
Brentwood Booragoon (Booragoon 1978-2005)		Bulldogs	Karoonda Park, Booragoon	B, BR, E1 South, DBC	C3	–	1978	1978-	2	2022
Bullcreek Leeming (Bullcreek 1980-93)		Bombers	Beasley Park, Leeming	B, BR, E1 South, DBC	B, C3	–	1980	1980-	7	2012
Canning South Perth (Canning-Victoria Park-South Perth 2009-13)		Tigers	Wyong Reserve, Bentley	C2, C2R	C1	SFL	2001	2009-	2	2025
Canning Vale		Cougars	Clifton Reserve, Canning Vale	C2, C2R	C2	–	2011	2011-	2	2012
Carlisle		Cougars	Carlisle Reserve, Carlisle	C3, C3R	C3	–	1962	1962-	6	2013
Cockburn Cobras (Cockburn 2012-20)		Cobras	Davilak Reserve, Hamilton Hill	C1, C1R, IDC	C1	MFL	1993	2012-	1	2019
Cockburn Lakes (Robbs Jetty 1980-83)		Warriors	Anning Park, South Lake	B, BR, E2 South, DBC		WAFA	1980	1980-2003, 2005-	11	2022
Collegians (Collegians-Old Scotch 1984-94)		Collies	David Cruickshank Reserve, Dalkeith	B, BR, E1 North, DBC	B	–	1961	1961-	11	2010
Coolbellup		Cats	Tempest Park, Coolbellup	C4, C4R, E2 South	C1	–	1975	1975-	3	2025
Coolbinia (Coolbinia-West Perth 2003-18)		Falcons	Yokine Reserve, Yokine	C3, C3R, E2 North	C4	–	2003	2003-	2	2018
Cottesloe		Roosters	Cottesloe Oval, Cottesloe	C2, C2R	C2	–	2014	2014-	0	-
Curtin University Wesley (Wesley Curtin 1990-2015)		Tigers	Curtin University South Oval, Bentley	A, AR, C4, C4R, E2 South, LKC, PSC	A, AR	–	1990	1990-	6	2023
Dianella Morley		Raiders	Dianella Regional Open Space, Dianella	C5, C5R, WCC		–	1991	1991-	3	2017
East Fremantle (Winnacott 2020-24)		Eagles	Winnacott Reserve, Willagee	C3, C3R	C4	FESFA	1921	1939-1959, 1980-	5	2000
Ellenbrook		Eels	Ellenbrook District Open Space, Ellenbrook	C3, C3R, E2 North, BJC	C3	WAFA	2002	2007-	0	-
Forrestdale		Falcons	William Skeet Oval, Forrestdale	C1, C1R, E1 South, IDC	C1	WAFA	1993	1993-1998, 2009-	3	2024
Forrestfield		Rhinos	John Reid Oval, Forrestfield	C5, C5R		HFA	2013	2015-	0	-
Fremantle C.B.C			Morris Buzacott Reserve, Kardinya	A, AR, D, DR, PSC, DC	C2, C4	–	1933	1933-	7	2022
Gosnells		Hawks	Gosnells Oval, Gosnells	C2, C2R, E2 South, LKC	C2	SFL	1914	1931-1933, 2009-	2	2024
Hamersley Carine (Hamersley 1974-89)		Hawks	Carine Regional Open Space, Carine	C1, C1R, E1 North, IDC	A, AR	–	1974	1974-	9	2022
Hammond Park		Hurricanes	Botany Park, Hammond Park	LKC		–	2008	2025-	0	-
High Wycombe		Bulldogs	Scott Reserve, High Wycombe	C4, C4R, BJC		–	1992	1992-	6	2026
Hills Rangers		Rangers	Sawyers Valley Oval, Sawyers Valley		C2	–	2018	2018-2022, 2024-	0	-
Jandakot		Jets	Atwell Reserve, Atwell	C1, C1R, E1 South, IDC	C4	MFL	2009	2011-	3	2020
Joondalup (ECU Jets 2016-24)		Jets	Emerald Park, Edgewater	E2 North		–	2016	2016-	0	-
Kalamunda		Cougars	Ray Owen Reserve, Lesmurdie	B, BR, E2 North, DBC	C1	SFL	1965	2001-	4	2013
Kelmscott		Bulldogs	John Dunn Oval, Kelmscott	E1 South	B	MFL	1897	2009-2017, 2021-	3	2014
Kenwick		Royals	Mills Park, Beckenham	C3, C3R, BJC	C2	SFL	1948	2009-	2	2024
Kingsley		Cats	Kinglsey Park, Kingsley	C2, C2R, C5, C5R, LKC, WCC	C3	MFL	1994	1998-	3	2026
Kingsway (Wanneroo 1977-80)		Kangaroos	Kingsway Sporting Complex, Madeley	A, AR, E1 North, PSC	C1, C4	MFL	1948	1977-1980, 2008-	4	2024
Koongamia		Crows	Koongamia Oval, Koongamia		C4	MFL	2000	2023-	0	-
Kwinana		Knights	Medina Oval, Medina	C1, C1R, IDC	B	MFL	1962	2014-	0	-
Lynwood Ferndale		Panthers	Ferndale Park, Ferndale	C4, C4R, WCC	C4	–	1979	1979-	3	2012
Maddington		Bulls	Harmony Fields, Maddington	E1 South		SFL	1923	2009-	2	2016
Manning Rippers		Rippers	James Miller Oval, Manning	C4, C4R, E2 South, LKC	C3	–	1997	1997-	2	2023
Melville (Palmyra 1921-57, 1964-67; East Fremantle-Palmyra 1961-62; East Fremantle 1963)		Rams	Melville Reserve, Melville	B, BR, DBC	A, AR	FSFA, WAFA	1906	1939-1983, 1985-	8	2025
Mosman Park		Mozzies	Tom Perrott Reserve, Mosman Park	C1, C1R, IDC	C2	SFL	1921	1939-1973, 1998-	5	2023
Mount Lawley		Hawks	Hamer Park Reserve, Mount Lawley	A, AR, C4, C4R, PSC, WCC	C2	–	1963	1963-	20	2025
Nollamara		Roos	Des Penman Reserve, Nollamara	E2 North		WAFA	1964	1964-2003, 2008-2023, 2026-	11	2016
Noranda (Noranda-ECU 2011-13)		Hawks	Lightning Park, Noranda	C4, C4R		MFL	2004	2011-	2	2015
North Beach		Tigers	Charles Riley Reserve, North Beach	A, AR, D, DR, E1 North, E2 North, PSC, DC	A, AR	–	1965	1965-	20	2026
North Fremantle		Magpies	Gil Fraser Reserve, North Fremantle	B, BR, D, DR, DBC, DC	A, AR	FSFA	1921	1939-	29	2024
North Mandurah		Magpies	Lakelands Reserve, Lakelands	C5, C5R, WCC	C4	PFL	2019	2022-	0	-
Ocean Ridge (Edgewater 1979-85)		Eagles	Heathridge Park, Heathridge	A, AR, D, DR, PSC, DC	B	–	1979	1979-	5	2023
Piara Waters (Southern River 2009-14)		Falcons	Piara Waters Oval, Piara Waters	C2, C2R, E2 South, LKC	B	SFL	1998	2009-	3	2021
Quinns District		Bulls	Ridgewood Park, Ridgewood	C1, C1R, E1 North, IDC	A, AR	MFL	2000	2001-	4	2025
Roleystone		Tigers	Cross Park, Roleystone	C3, C3R, BJC	C1	WAFA	1987	2009-	1	2021
Rossmoyne		Rhinos	Shelley Park, Shelley	C5, C5R, BJC	B	WAFA	1996	1996-2003, 2009-	3	1998
Safety Bay		Stingers	Stan Twight Reserve, Rockingham	C5, C5R, WCC	C3	MFL	1982	2010-2016, 2023-	0	-
Scarborough		Hawks	Millington Reserve, Karrinyup	A, AR, E1 North, BJC, PSC	B, C3	–	1970	1970-	17	2020
Secret Harbour		Dockers	Rhonda Scarrott Park, Golden Bay	E2 South	C4	MFL	2011	2013-	1	2017
SNESA (St Norberts 1978-2010)		Saints	Queens Park Reserve, Queens Park	C4, C4R		WAFA	1978	1978-2003, 2005-	2	1997
Stirling (Balcatta-Osborne Park 1998-2001)		Saints	Richard Guelfi Reserve, Balcatta	C3, C3R, E2 North		–	1988	1998-	4	2025
Swan Athletic		Swans	Swan Athletic Oval, Herne Hill	B, BR, C5, C5R, DBC, WCC	B	HFA	1930	1979	9	2024
Swan Valley		Valley	Swan Valley Sporting Complex, Herne Hill	C2, C2R, LKC	C1	HFA	1965	1973-1979, 2006-	5	1978
Swan View		Swans	Brown Park, Swan View	C4, C4R, LKC		HFA	1962	1981-1982, 1989-1995, 2002-2016, 2025-	4	2003
Thornlie		Lions	Thornlie Oval, Thornlie	C1, C1R, IDC	C3	SFL	1970	2009-	2	2017
Trinity Aquinas (Trinity Old Boys 1970-80)		Boomers	Bill Grayden Reserve, Como	A, AR, D, DR, PSC, DC	A, AR	–	1970	1970-	12	2017
University			UWA Sports Park, Mount Claremont	A, AR, D, DR, PSC, DC	A, AR	–	1928	1928-	47	2024
Wanneroo		Roos	Wanneroo Showgrounds, Wanneroo	C1, C1R, E1 North, E2 North, BJC, IDC	C2	–	1985	1985-	11	2026
Warnbro Swans		Swans	Warnbro Recreation Oval, Warnbro	C3, C3R, E1 South, BJC	B	MDFL	1989	1991-	4	2018
Warwick Greenwood		Bulls	Percy Doyle Reserve, Duncraig	E2 North		SFL	2003	2025-	0	-
Wembley		Magpies	Wembley Sports Park, Jolimont	C1, C1R, E1 North, IDC	A, AR	PSFA	1927	1938-	30	2020
West Coast (West Coast Cowan 2001-13)		Tigers	City Beach Oval, City Beach	B, BR, E1 North, DBC		–	1984	1984-	8	2021
Whitford		Warriors	MacDonald Park, Padbury	B, BR, C5, C5R, DBC	C2	–	1976	1976-	11	2025
Willetton		Blues	Burrendah Reserve, Willetton	C3, C3R, E1 South, BJC	C2	SFL	1976	1976-1978, 1999-	4	2026
Yanchep		Red Hawks	Splendid Park, Yanchep	C4, C4R, WCC	C3	MFL	1997	2015-	0	-

=== Former ===
Club	Colours	Nickname	Home Ground	Former League	Est.	Years in PFL	PFL Senior Premierships		Fate
Club	Colours	Nickname	Home Ground	Former League	Est.	Years in PFL	Total	Most Recent	Fate
5MD Army Swans		Swans	Karrakatta Army Oval (Irwin Barracks), Karrakatta	–	1985	1985-1987	0	-	Folded after 1987 season
Achilles				–	1938	1938-1940	0	-	Folded due to WWII
AMP				–	1971	1971-1973	0	-	Folded after 1973 season
ANZ Bank		Roos	Haig Park, East Perth	–	1983	1983-1990	1	1983	Folded after 1990 season
Applecross		Numbats	Troy Park, Attadale	–	1980	1980-1991	2	1983	Folded after 1991 season
Ascot		Raiders	Selby Park, Redcliffe	–	2000	2000-2002	2	2001	Folded after 2002 season
Balcatta (AICA 1980-83; Northbridge-AICA 1984-88; Balcatta-AICA 1989)	(1980-89)(1990-97)	Cats	Jones Paskin Reserve, Balcatta	–	1980	1980-1997	5	1996	Merged with Osborne Park to form Balcatta-Osborne Park in 1998
Bankwest (R&I Bank 1974-94)	(1974-94) (1995-96)	Rippers	Raphael Park, Victoria Park	–	1974	1974-1996	0	-	Merged with Manning to form Manning Rippers in 1997
Bassendean (1)				–	1967	1967-1971	2	1968	Folded after 1971 season
Bedford				–	1975	1975-1977	0	-	Folded after 1977 season
Beechboro		Bombers	Altone Park, Beechboro	WAFA	1999	2006-2013	1	2006	Moved to Metropolitan FL in 2014
Belmont (1)			Belmont Oval, Cloverdale	–	1964	1946-1960	0	-	Moved to Sunday National FL in 1961
Belmont (2)						1964, 1969 (colts only)	0	-	
Boans				–	1937	1937-1938	0	-	Folded after 1938 season
Byford		Falcons	Briggs Park, Byford	MDFL	1983	1990	0	-	Folded after 1990 season
Carlton				–	1981	1981	0	-	Folded after 1981 season
Central Districts				SNFL	1970	1973-1975	0	-	Folded after 1975 season
Chas Moore Co.			None	–	1925	1925	0	-	Folded after 1925 season
City Beach		Allstars	City Beach Oval, City Beach	–	1975	1975-1983	2	1981	Merged with Floreat-Marist to form West Coast Amateurs in 1984
City of Perth			Higgins Park, East Victoria Park	–	1982	1982-1985	1	1982	Merged with Commonwealth Bank to form Victoria Park in 1986
Claremont Amateurs				–	1937	1937-1941	0	-	Folded due to WWII
Claremont CAE (TTC Claremont 1960-63, 1970-72; TC Claremont 1972-82)				–	1960	1960-1963, 1970-1983	4	1974	Merged with Teacher's College in 1964, reformed in 1970. Folded after 1983 season
Claremont-Nedlands			Melvista Park, Nedlands	–	1946	1946-1971	1	1951	Folded after 1971 season
Cockburn (1) (Fremantle 1954-57)				–	1954	1954-1962	1	1955	Folded after 1962 season
Commonwealth Bank (Interbanks 1938-48, Banks 1949-50)	(1922-?) (?-1985)		Morris Mundy Reserve, Kensington	–	1922	1922-1930, 1932-1939, 1947-1957, 1968-1985	5	1978	Entered recesss in 1931, 1940 and 1958. Merged with City of Perth to form Victoria Park in 1986
Coolbinia-Yokine		Saints	Yokine Reserve, Yokine	–	1980	1980-2002	2	1985	Merged with Osborne Districts to form Coolbinia-West Perth in 2003
Cowan University (TC Churchlands 1975-82; Churchlands CAE 1983; WACAE 1984-90; ECU Churchlands 1998-99.)	(1975-92)(1993-2000)	Hawks	Churchlands College Oval, Churchlands	–	1975	1975-2000	7	1994	Absorbed by West Coast Amateur to form West Coast Cowan in 2001
Curtin University (W.A.I.T 1969-87)		Tigers	Curtin University South Oval, Bentley	–	1969	1969-89	1	1984	Merged with Old Wesley to form Wesley Curtin in 1990
D & W Murray				–	1929	1929-1930	0	-	Folded after 1930 season
Dianella		Panthers	Dianella Regional Open Space, Dianella	–	1975	1975-1990	4	1986	Merged with Morley to form Dianella Morley in 1991
Doubleview			Bennett Park, Doubleview	–	1973	1973-1980	0	-	Folded after 1980 season
East Perth (1)	Dark with darker sash		Raphael Park, Victoria Park	–	1947	1947-1966	3	1957	Folded after 1966 season
East Perth (2)				–	1976	1976-1979	2	1977	Folded after 1979 season
East Perth (3)		Royals	Leederville Oval, Leederville	WAWFL	1902	2020	0	-	Moved to WAFL Women's in 2023
East Victoria Park				–		1977-1980 (colts only)	0	-	
Fauldings-Wills			None	–	1922	1922	0	-	Merged with Foy & Gibsons to form Wills-Foys in 1923
Fire Brigade			Haig Park, East Perth	–	1977	1977-1983	1	1979	Folded after 1983 season
Floreat Park				–	1961	1961-1978	1	1969	Merged with Marist Old Boys to form Floreat-Marist in 1979
Floreat-Marist		Kangaroos	Marist College Oval, Churchlands	–	1979	1979-1983	1	1979	Merged with City Beach to form West Coast Amateurs in 1984
Forrestfield (1)		Hawks	Hartfield Park, Forrestfield	–	1978	1978-1999	5	1994	Folded after 1999 season
Foy & Gibsons (1)			None	–	1922	1922	0	-	Merged with Fauldings-Wills to form Wills-Foys in 1923
Foy & Gibsons (2)				–	1932	1932-1933	0	-	Folded after 1933 season
General Motors				–	1927	1927-1929	0	-	Folded after 1929 season
Girrawheen		Hedgehogs	Hudson Park, Girrawheen	–	1982	1982-1989	1	1987	Folded after 1989 season
Graylands		Grays	College Park Upper, Nedlands	SNFL	1968	1973-1986	0	-	Folded after 1986 season
Greenwood		Woodpeckers	Penistone Reserve, Greenwood	–	1978	1978-1982	0	-	Folded after 1982 season
Hilton Park			Hilton Park, Beaconsfield	–	1963	1963-1967	0	-	Folded after 1967 season
Inglewood (Mount Lawley 1947-48, Inglewood-Mount Lawley 1949-52)			Inglewood Oval, Inglewood	PSFA	1936	1938-1940, 1947-1956	1	1952	Entered recess in 1940. Folded after 1956 season
Innaloo		Bulldogs	Birralee Park, Innaloo	–	1967	1967-1994, 1996-2000	11	1998	Recess in 1995. Moved to Mercantile FA in 2001
John XXIII			College Park Lower, Nedlands	–	1978	1978-1989	1	1989	Merged with Swanbourne-Nedlands to form John XXIII-Swanbourne in 1990
John XXIII-Swanbourne	Blue with yellow and white vertical stripes		Allen Park, Swanbourne	–	1990	1990-1993	0	-	Folded after 1993 season
Koondoola		Hawks	Koondoola Park, Koondoola	–	1979	1979-1985	0	-	Folded after 1995 season
Koongamia		Crows	Koongamia Oval, Koongamia	WAFA	1993	2009-2010	0	-	Moved to Mercantile FA in 2011
Langford		Bombers		–	1982	1982	0	-	Folded after 1982 season
Leederville				SNFL	1962	1966-1970	0	-	Folded after 1970 season
Maccabi				–	1972	1972-1976	0	-	Folded after 1976 season
Macedonia United		Lions	Les Lilleyman Reserve, North Perth	–	1975	1975-1979	0	-	Folded after 1979 season
Mallochs				–	1926	1926	0	-	Folded after 1936 season
Mallochs-Brennans			None	–	1922	1922-1923	1	1922	Folded after 1923 season
Maranatha				–	1979	1979-1981	0	-	Folded after 1981 season
Marangaroo		Roos	Kingsway Reserve, Madeley	–	1998	1998-2002	1	2001	Folded after 2002 season
Marist Old Boys			Marist College Oval, Churchlands	–	1970	1970-1978	1	1971	Merged with Floreat Park to form Floreat-Marist in 1979
Maylands		Rams	Gibbney Reserve, Maylands	PSFA	1922	1938-1992	7	1989	Folded after 1992 season
Metropolitan Christians			Peet Park, Kewdale	–	1998	1998	0	-	Folded after 1998 season
Mid City				–	1975	1975	0	-	Folded after 1975 season
Midland (Midland Junction 1946-59)		Tigers	Midland Oval, Midland	SNFL	1946	1946-1959, 1973-1974	5	1974	Moved to West Australian FA in 1975
Mirrabooka		Bombers	Robinson Reserve, Tuart Hill	–	1984	1984-1988	0	-	Merged with Mt Hawthorn-West Perth to form Osborne Districts in 1988
Moores Wigs (Wigs Moores 1922)			None	–	1922	1922-1923	0	-	Folded after 1923 season
Morley (Herdsman Districts 1973-74)		Bulldogs	RA Cook Reserve, Bedford	SNFL	1969	1973-1990	0	-	Merged with Dianella to form Dianella-Morley in 1991
Mount Hawthorn				–	1963	1963-1964	0	-	Merged with West Perth to form Mt Hawthorn-West Perth in 1965
Mount Hawthorn-West Perth		Mounties	Beatty Park, North Perth	–	1965	1965-1987	3	1982	Merged with Mirrabooka to form Osborne Districts in 1988
Mount Lawley CAE				–	1971	1971-1983	3	1979	Folded after 1983 season
Mundaring-Hills (Mundaring 1987-89)		Roos	Mundaring Recreation Ground, Mundaring	HFA		1987-1994	1	1987	Returned to Hills FA in 1995
Murdoch				–	1976	1976-1979	0	-	Folded after 1979 season
Murdoch University		Boomers	Murdoch University Oval, Murdoch	–	1982	1982-1993	0	-	Folded after 1993 season
Muresk		Rams	Muresk Agricultural College, Muresk	–	1978	1972-1988	2	1979	Folded after 1988 season
Mustangs		Mustangs	Reid Oval, Forrestfield	WAFA	2001	2009	0	-	Folded after 2009 season
National Bank		Nationals	Raphael Park, Victoria Park	–	1978	1978-1993	1	1978	Folded after 1993 season
Navy			Stirling Oval, Stirling	–	1987	1987-1989	1	1987	Folded after 1989 season
Northern Suburbs				–	1971	1971	0	-	Folded after 1971 season
Old Guildfordians			Pexton Oval, Guildford	–	1991	1991-1997	0	-	Folded after 1997 season
Old Louisians				–	1959	1959-1963	0	-	Folded after 1963 season
Old Modernians			Modern School Oval, Subiaco	–	1924	1924, 1927-1933, 1935-1936	0	-	Entered recess in 1925 and 1934. Folded after 1936 season.
Old Scotch (Nedlands STC 1970-80)				–	1970	1970-1983	1	1982	Merged with Collegians to form Collegians-Old Scotch in 1984
Old Wesley		Dragons	Collins Oval, Wesley College, South Perth	–	1966	1966-1989	1	1966	Merged with Curtin University to form Wesley Curtin in 1990
Osborne Districts		Bears	Robinson Reserve, Tuart Hill	–	1988	1988-2002	4	1987	Merged with Coolbinia-Yokine to form Coolbinia-West Perth in 2003
Osborne Park (1)		Saints	Richard Guelfi Reserve, Balcatta	SNFL	1920s	1946-1957, 1974-1984	4	1981	Moved to Sunday FL in 1985
Osborne Park (2)		Saints	Robinson Reserve, Tuart Hill	MFL	2007	2012-2025	1	2023	Folded after being banned by PFL due to offensive incident after 2025 season.
Perth				–	1965	1965-1981	1	1980	Folded after 1981 season
Pinjarra		Tigers	Sir Ross McLarty Oval, Pinjarra	NMFA	1938	1974	0	-	Formed Murray Districts FL in 1975
Postal Institute				–	1927	1927-1936, 1939	3	1932	Recess in 1937-38. Folded due to WWII
RAAF (1)				–	1940	1940-1941	0	-	Entered recess in 1942.
RAAF (2)		Roodogs	RAAF Base Pearce and Pickett Park, Bullsbrook	–	1982	1982-1992	0	-	Folded after 1992 season
Redcliffe		Rockets	Selby Park, Redcliffe	–	1985	1985-1998	5	1997	Merged with Belmont to form Belmont-Redcliffe in 1999
Riverton (1)			Riverton Reserve, Riverton	SNFL	1967	1973-1975	0	-	Merged with Willetton JFC to form Willetton in 1976
Riverton (2)			Riverton Reserve, Riverton	–	1985	1985-1993	0	-	Folded after 1993 season
Rivervale				–	1963	1963-1964	0	-	Folded after 1964 season
Rockingham		Rams	Anniversary Park, Rockingham	SFL	1954	1987-1993	4	1992	Moved to Peel FL in 1994
Royal Australian Engineers			Karrakatta Army Oval (Irwin Barracks), Karrakatta	–	1952	1952-1957	0	-	Folded after 1957 season
Sandovers (Harris Scarfe & Sandovers 1923-?)	(1922)(1923-?) Light with dark band (1935)			–	1922	1922-1940	4	1937	Folded due to WWII, re-formed in Mercantile FA in 1951
Sawyers Valley		Saints	Sawyers Valley Oval, Sawyers Valley	HFA	1946	1987-1992	0	-	Returned to Hills FA in 1993
Scarborough (1)		Eagles	Bennett Park, Doubleview			1965-1966 (colts only)	0	-	
Shenton Park			Rosalie Park, Shenton Park	–	1948	1948-1959, 1962	0	-	Folded after 1962 season
South Fremantle			Fremantle Park, Fremantle	–	1948	1948-1962	3	1959	Folded after 1962 season
South Perth (Hurlingham 1931-34)		Tigers	Ernest Johnston Oval, South Perth	–	1931	1931-1966, 1979-1980	0	-	Moved to South Suburban Murray FL in 1967
Southern Districts (1)			Mills Park, Beckenham	–	1951	1951	0	-	Folded after 1951 season
Southern Districts (2)				–	1973	1973	0	-	Folded after 1973 season
State Sawmills				–	1925	1925	0	-	Folded after 1925 season
Stirling Districts (1)				–	1973	1973-1974	0	-	Folded after 1974 season
Stirling Districts (2)		Maulers	Wordsworth Reserve, Inglewood	MFA		1982-1983	0	-	Moved to Hills FA in 1984
Subiaco Police Boys				–	1963	1963	0	-	Folded after 1963 season
Swan Districts (1)				PSFA		1941	0	-	Folded after 1941 season
Swan Districts (2)				–	1963	1963-1965	0	-	Folded after 1965 season
Swan Districts (3)		Swans	Bassendean Oval, Bassendean	MFL	2006	2011-2017	0	-	Folded after 2017 season
Swanbourne-Nedlands (Swanbourne 1941-48, 1951-60, 1964-82; Swanbourne-Cottesloe 1949-50)			Allen Park, Swanbourne	–	1941	1941, 1947-1989	5	1988	Merged with John XXIII to form John XXIII-Swanbourne in 1990
Takari			Jones Paskin Reserve, Balcatta	–		1981 (colts only)	0	-	Absorbed by Osborne Park (1) in 1982
TC Graylands				–	1963	1963, 1970-1978	2	1973	Merged into Teacher's College in 1964. Folded after 1978 season.
Teacher's College (Claremont Teachers' College 1924)			Claremont Oval, Claremont	–	1924	1924-1929, 1947-1956, 1961, 1963, 1965-1982	3	1926	Entered recess in 1930, 1957, 1962, and 1964. Folded after 1982 season.
Teacher's Training College				–	1964	1964-1969	1	1967	Folded after 1969 season
Victoria Park (1)		Panthers	Higgins Park, East Victoria Park	–	1947	1947-1965	4	1960	Moved to South Suburban Murray FL in 1966
Victoria Park (2)						1968-1971 (colts only)	0	-	
Victoria Park (3)		Bombers	Higgins Park, East Victoria Park	–	1986	1986-1992	0	-	Folded after 1992 season
Water Supply	(1924)(1925-38)		None	–	1924	1924-1925, 1937-1938	0	-	Entered recess in 1926. Folded after 1938 season
West Perth (Mount Hawthorn 1938-48)			Leederville Oval, Leederville	PSFA	1923	1938-1964	1	1953	Merged with Mount Hawthorn to form Mount Hawthorn-West Perth in 1965
West Perth Hellenic (Hellenic 1973-92)		Spartans	Abbett Park Reserve, Scarborough	SFA	1953	1973-1998	3	1984	Folded after 1998 season
Western Command			Karrakatta Army Oval (Irwin Barracks), Karrakatta	–	1949	1949-1950	0	-	Folded after 1950 season
Wills-Dunlops				–	1923	1923	0	-	Folded after 1923 season
Wills-Foys				–	1923	1923	0	-	Folded after 1923 season
Windsor				–	1978	1978	0	-	Folded after 1978 season
Wonderers			Barry Britton Reserve, Balga	–	1999	1999-2002	3	2001	Entered recess in 2003. Re-formed in WAFA in 2004
YCW				–	1946	1946	0	-	Folded after 1946 season
Young Labour League				PSFA	1936	1938-1939	0	-	Folded after 1939 season

== Premierships ==
=== Men ===
Year	A	B	C1/C	C2/D	C3/E	C4/F	C5/G/D1	D2/H	I	J	K	Sunday
2026	North Beach	Whitford	Wanneroo	Kingsley	Willetton	High Wycombe	Whitford	7 divisions (2018-)				
2025	North Beach	Mount Lawley	Melville	Quinns District	Canning South Perth	Stirling	Coolbellup	7 divisions (2018-)				
2024	Kingsway	North Fremantle	Swan Athletic	Gosnells	Forrestdale	University	Kenwick	7 divisions (2018-)				
2023	Curtin Uni Wesley	Ocean Ridge	Ballajura	Mosman Park	Belmont Districts	Osborne Park	Manning Rippers	7 divisions (2018-)				
2022	Fremantle CBC	Wanneroo	Hamersley Carine	Brentwood Booragoon	Cockburn Lakes	North Beach	Curtin Uni Wesley	7 divisions (2018-)				
2021	Kingsway	West Coast	Baldivis	High Wycombe	Piara Waters	Roleystone	North Beach	7 divisions (2018-)				
2020	Scarborough	Wembley	Ocean Ridge	Jandakot	Mosman Park	Piara Waters	University	7 divisions (2018-)				
2019	University	Curtin Wesley	Bassendean	Quinns District	Jandakot	Cockburn Cobras	University	7 divisions (2018-)				
2018	Scarborough	Kingsley	Ballajura	Warnbro Swans	Coolbinia	Jandakot	University	7 divisions (2018-)				
2017	Trinity Aquinas	Wanneroo	Thornlie	Bassendean	Dianella Morley	Secret Harbour	University	North Fremantle	8 divisions (2014-2017)			
2016	Trinity Aquinas	Wembley	Maddington	Thornlie	Nollamara	Belmont Districts	Trinity Aquinas	Whitford	8 divisions (2014-2017)			
2015	University	Hamersley Carine	Quinns District	Noranda	Ballajura	Nollamara	Trinity Aquinas	Wembley	8 divisions (2014-2017)			
2014	University	Kelmscott	Kingsway	Bassendean	Kenwick	Southern River	Whitford	Scarborough	8 divisions (2014-2017)			
2013	Wesley Curtin	Kalamunda	Kelmscott	Quinns District	Carlisle	Brentwood Booragoon	Whitford	7 divisions (2013				
2012	University	Wesley Curtin	Bullcreek Leeming	Lynwood Ferndale	Canning Vale	Noranda	Trinity Aquinas	Wembley	8 divisions (2009-2012)			
2011	University	Hamersley Carine	Scarborough	Coolbinia West Perth	Belmont Districts	Canning Vale	North Fremantle	Wembley	8 divisions (2009-2012)			
2010	North Beach	Collegians	Kalamunda (Black), Wanneroo (Gold)	Canning Vic Park South Perth	North Fremantle	Fremantle CBC	Ocean Ridge	Warnbro Swans	8 divisions (2009-2012)			
2009	North Beach	Mount Lawley	Gosnells (Black), Maddington (Gold)	Kelmscott (Black), Manning Rippers (Gold)	North Fremantle	Bullcreek Leeming	Nollamara	North Fremantle	8 divisions (2009-2012)			
2008	North Beach	Collegians	Kingsley	Kingsway	Coolbellup	Trinity Aquinas	North Fremantle	7 divisions (2008)				
2007	North Beach	West Coast Cowan	Willetton	Belmont Districts	University	5 divisions (2005-2007)						
2006	North Beach	Hamersley Carine	West Coast Cowan	Beechboro	North Fremantle	5 divisions (2005-2007)						
2005	North Beach	Wembley	Bullcreek Leeming	Melville	North Fremantle	5 divisions (2005-2007)						
2004	North Beach	Scarborough	Kalamunda	Mosman Park	Swan Athletic	High Wycombe	6 divisions (2003-2004)					
2003	North Fremantle	Whitford	High Wycombe	Swan View	Swan Athletic	Stirling	6 divisions (2003-2004)					
2002	North Beach	Collegians	Bassendean	Warnbro Swans	Swan View	Stirling	Melville	7 divisions (1997-2002)				
2001	North Beach	Wanneroo	Cockburn Lakes	Ascot	Wonderers	Marangaroo	Kalamunda	7 divisions (1997-2002)				
2000	CBC	Nollamara	East Fremantle	Willetton	Ascot	Wonderers	Nollamara	7 divisions (1997-2002)				
1999	North Beach	Trinity Aquinas	Bullcreek Leeming	High Wycombe	Willetton	CBC	Wonderers	7 divisions (1997-2002)				
1998	Scarborough	Balcatta Osborne Park	Rossmoyne	East Fremantle	Innaloo	North Fremantle	Wesley Curtin	7 divisions (1997-2002)				
1997	Scarborough	Mount Lawley	Redcliffe	Rossmoyne	St Norberts	West Coast	Wembley	7 divisions (1997-2002)				
1996	University	CBC	Balcatta	University	Swan Athletic	High Wycombe	Rossmoyne	West Coast	Forrestdale	Innaloo	10 divisions (1995-1996)	
1995	Scarborough	Swan Athletic	Wanneroo	CBC	University	University	Warnbro Swans	East Fremantle	North Fremantle	Forrestdale	10 divisions (1995-1996)	
1994	West Coast	CBC	Cockburn Lakes	Cowan University	Coolbellup	University	Forrestfield	Dianella Morley	Cowan University	Whitford	Cockburn Lakes	11 divisions (1985-1994)
1993	North Beach	North Fremantle	Wembley	Redcliffe	Brentwood	Wembley	Hamersley Carine	Forrestfield	Mount Lawley	Hamersley Carine	Innaloo	11 divisions (1985-1994)
1992	Mount Lawley	Whitford	Mt Lawley	Hamersley Carine	Redcliffe	Redcliffe	North Fremantle	Rockingham	Cockburn Lakes	Wanneroo	Wembley	11 divisions (1985-1994)
1991	Mount Lawley	Collegians Old Scotch	Whitford	Bullcreek	University	Wanneroo	Wembley	Ocean Ridge	North Beach	Cockburn Lakes	Ocean Ridge	11 divisions (1985-1994)
1990	North Beach	North Fremantle	Wanneroo	W.A.C.A.E	Hamersley Carine	West Coast	Redcliffe	University	Swan View	Rockingham	Collegians Old Scotch	11 divisions (1985-1994)
1989	North Beach	Maylands	Cockburn Lakes	Wembley	Bullcreek	John 23rd	Wanneroo	Wembley	Swan Athletic	Swan View	Rockingham	11 divisions (1985-1994)
1988	Mount Lawley	Innaloo	?	Rockingham	Trinity Aquinas		Bayswater	Swanbourne	University	Scarborough	Bayswater	11 divisions (1985-1994)
1987	Mount Lawley	West Coast	Swan Athletic	Cockburn Lakes	Mundaring	Trinity Aquinas	Nollamara	Girrawheen	Navy	University	Mt Hawthorn West Perth	11 divisions (1985-1994)
1986	Mount Lawley	North Fremantle	Whitford	Nollamara	Cockburn Lakes	University	Innaloo	Dianella	East Fremantle	North Fremantle	Innaloo	11 divisions (1985-1994)
1985	Mount Lawley	Innaloo	Mount Lawley	Swan Athletic	Coolbinia Yokine	Cockburn Lakes	Whitford	Innaloo	Bassendean	Wanneroo	North Fremantle	11 divisions (1985-1994)
1984	Wembley	North Fremantle	Mount Lawley	Lynwood Ferndale	W.A.C.A.E	Scarborough	Cockburn Lakes	Scarborough	Girrawheen	Hellenic	W.A.I.T	Sunday (1973-1983)
1983	Mount Lawley	Scarborough	Carlisle	Dianella	University	Churchlands	Applecross	Mount Lawley	A.I.C.A	ANZ	Dianella	A.I.C.A
1982	Old Scotch	Bayswater	Mt Hawthorn West Perth	Hellenics	Dianella	Trinity Aquinas	University	Applecross	Nollamara	City of Perth	Mt Hawthorn West Perth	A.I.C.A
1981	University	Scarborough	City Beach	Osborne Park	North Beach	Forrestfield	Scarborough	Coolbinia Yokine	Bullcreek	Mount Lawley	Maylands	A.I.C.A
1980	Nollamara	N.S.T.C	University	Perth	Bayswater	North Beach	Forrestfield	St Norberts	Lynwood Ferndale	Scarborough	Osborne Park	Swan Athletic
1979	Mount Lawley	Collegians	N.S.T.C	Wembley	Floreat Marist	Innaloo	Muresk	Swanbourne	Forrestfield	TC Mount Lawley	11 divisions (1979)	Fire Brigade
1978	Wembley	Wembley	Collegians	Commonwealth Bank	TC Mount Lawley	Nollamara	Mount Lawley	Muresk	National Bank	10 divisions (1978)		Swan Valley
1977	University	Maylands	Mount Lawley	Hamersley	TC Churchlands	Osborne Park	East Perth	TC Churchlands	9 divisions (1977)			Swan Valley
1976	Wembley (A), Scarborough (A2)	Maylands	Trinity Old Boys	TC Churchlands	R & I Bank	University	East Perth	8 divisions (1976)				Swan Valley
1975	University	Melville	Commonwealth Bank	TC Churchlands	City Beach	6 divisions (1974-1975)						Swan Valley
1974	Wembley	Nollamara	TC Claremont	TTC Mount Lawley	Midland	6 divisions (1974-1975)						Swan Valley
1973	Wembley	Mosman Park	Graylands TC	Collegians	5 divisions (1973)							Hellenic
1972	Wembley	University	Graylands TC	Trinity Old Boys	4 divisions (1972-1973)							
1971	Wembley	Nedlands TTC	Swanbourne	Carlisle	Marist Old Boys	Scarborough	6 divisions (1969-1971)					
1970	University	University	Collegians	TTC Claremont	Innaloo	Carlisle	6 divisions (1969-1971)					
1969	University	Collegians	Floreat Park	North Fremantle	Mount Lawley	Innaloo	6 divisions (1969-1971)					
1968	Wembley	Wembley	Mt Hawthorn West Perth	Bassendean	North Fremantle	5 divisions (1967-1968)						
1967	C.B.C	Palmyra	Bayswater	Teachers Training College	Bassendean	5 divisions (1967-1968)						
1966	University	University	University	Old Wesley	4 divisions (1964-196)							
1965	University	University	Carlisle	Collegians	4 divisions (1964-196)							
1964	University	TTC Claremont	University	Carlisle	4 divisions (1964-196)							
1963	Wembley	TTC Claremont	Mount Lawley	3 divisions (1963)								
1962	University	Maylands	2 divisions (1957-1962)									
1961	University	Fremantle CBC	2 divisions (1957-1962)									
1960	North Fremantle	Victoria Park	2 divisions (1957-1962)									
1959	Wembley	South Fremantle	2 divisions (1957-1962)									
1958	Wembley	Midland Junction	2 divisions (1957-1962)									
1957	East Perth	Victoria Park	2 divisions (1957-1962)									
1956	East Perth	Midland Junction	Palmyra	3 divisions (1947-1956)								
1955	North Fremantle	University	Fremantle	3 divisions (1947-1956)								
1954	North Fremantle	Osborne Park	South Fremantle	3 divisions (1947-1956)								
1953	South Perth	West Perth	Victoria Park	3 divisions (1947-1956)								
1952	South Perth	Inglewood Mount Lawley	South Fremantle	3 divisions (1947-1956)								
1951	Mosman Park	Claremont Nedlands	Commonwealth Bank	3 divisions (1947-1956)								
1950	Midland Junction	East Perth (B)	Maylands	3 divisions (1947-1956)								
1949	North Fremantle	Palmyra	Palmyra	3 divisions (1947-1956)								
1948	University	Victoria Park	Swanbourne	3 divisions (1947-1956)								
1947	North Fremantle	South Perth	Swanbourne	3 divisions (1947-1956)								
1946	North Fremantle	Midland Junction	2 divisions (1939-1946)									
1942-1945	No competition due to WWII		2 divisions (1939-1946)									
1941	North Fremantle	Maylands	2 divisions (1939-1946)									
1940	Wembley	East Fremantle	2 divisions (1939-1946)									
1939	Wembley	North Fremantle	2 divisions (1939-1946)									
1938	Wembley	1 division (1922-1938)										
1937	Sandovers	1 division (1922-1938)										
1936	Sandovers	1 division (1922-1938)										
1935	Sandovers	1 division (1922-1938)										
1934	University	1 division (1922-1938)										
1933	University	1 division (1922-1938)										
1932	Postals	1 division (1922-1938)										
1931	Postals	1 division (1922-1938)										
1930	Postals	1 division (1922-1938)										
1929	University	1 division (1922-1938)										
1928	Sandovers	1 division (1922-1938)										
1927	Commonwealth Bank	1 division (1922-1938)										
1926	Teachers College	1 division (1922-1938)										
1925	Teachers College	1 division (1922-1938)										
1924	Teachers College	1 division (1922-1938)										
1923	Commonwealth Bank	1 division (1922-1938)										
1922	Mallochs-Brennans	1 division (1922-1938)										

=== Women's ===
Year	A	B	C/C1	C2	C3	C4	C5
2026	Trinity Aquinas	Scarborough	Bayswater	Gosnells	Manning Rippers	Koongamia	6 divisions (2024)
2025	University	Trinity Aquinas	Kelmscott	Swan Valley	Bayswater	Manning Rippers	6 divisions (2024)
2024	Wembley	Bullcreek Leeming	Trinity Aquinas	Kelmscott	Ballajura	Swan Valley	6 divisions (2024)
2023	Wembley	Melville	Baldivis	Trinity Aquinas	Kelmscott	Koongamia	Gosnells
2022	Warnbro Swans	Wembley	North Fremantle	Wanneroo	Scarborough	Cockburn Cobras	Bassendean
2021	Curtin Uni Wesley	Cottesloe	Wembley	North Fremantle	Hamersley Carine	West Coast	6 divisions (2021)
2020	Curtin Uni Wesley	Piara Waters	Kingsley	Swan Athletic	West Coast	5 divisions (2020)	
2019	Curtin Uni Wesley	Nollamara	Piara Waters	3 divisions (2019)			
2018	University	Cottesloe	2 divisions (2018)				

Source: WAAFL.com.au
