= 2011 WAFL season =

Australian rules football season

- 2011 WAFL logo
- Teams: 9
- Premiers: Claremont; 11th premiership
- Minor premiers: Claremont; 14th minor premiership
- Sandover Medallist: Luke Blackwell (Claremont)
- Bernie Naylor Medallist: Blake Broadhurst (Subiaco)

Attendance
- Matches played: 92
- Total attendance: 208,989 (2,272 per match)

The 2011 WAFL season was the 127th season of the West Australian Football League and its various incarnations. The season opened on 19 March, with East Perth defeating Swan Districts by 15 points at Steel Blue Oval, and concluded with the 2011 WAFL Grand Final, with Claremont defeating Subiaco by 56 points. The 2011 Sandover Medal was won by Luke Blackwell of Claremont. The top three teams – Claremont, Subiaco and West Perth – qualified for the 2012 Foxtel Cup.

== Rule changes ==
The WAFL implemented two rule changes for the 2011 season, to conform with similar rules changes in the Australian Football League (AFL):

- The advantage rule was altered to put the onus on the player rather than the umpire to decide whether they can take the advantage from a free kick.
- The rough conduct rule was altered to make any player who makes forceful contact to the head of another player while bumping is liable to suspension, unless the player was (a) contesting the ball and did not have a reasonable alternative way to contest the ball or (b) the contact was caused by circumstances outside the control of the player that could not reasonably be foreseen.

== Clubs ==
Club	Coach	Captain	Best and fairest	Leading goalkicker
Claremont	Simon McPhee	Clancy Rudeforth	Luke Blackwell	Beau Wilkes (42)
East Fremantle	Steve Malaxos	Mark McGough	Rory O'Brien	Brock O'Brien (51)
East Perth	Tony Micale	Michael Swan	Brendan Lee	Josh Smith (50)
Peel Thunder	Trevor Williams	Brendon Jones	Kristin Thornton	Bradley Holmes (36)
Perth	Damien McMahon	Steven Armstrong	Ross Young	Matthew Moody (41)
South Fremantle	John Dimmer	Jaymie Graham	Ryan Cook	Cory Dell'Olio (55)
Subiaco	Chris Waterman	Aidan Parker	Kyal Horsley	Blake Broadhurst (73)
Swan Districts	Greg Harding	Josh Roberts	Tallan Ames	Tim Geappen (51)
West Perth	Bill Monaghan	Jason Salecic	Dion Fleay	Anthony Tsalikis (39)

== Season ==
=== Round 1 ===
	Round 1
Saturday, 19 March (2:15 pm)	Swan Districts 16.11 (107)	def. by	East Perth 18.14 (122)	Steel Blue Oval (crowd: 3,361)	Report
Saturday, 19 March (2:15 pm)	East Fremantle 10.12 (72)	def. by	Claremont 23.15 (153)	East Fremantle Oval (crowd: 2,004)	Report
	Bye; Peel Thunder, Perth, South Fremantle, Subiaco, West Perth
Ian Richardson (Claremont) kicked seven goals.

=== Round 2 ===
	Round 2
Friday, 25 March (6:45 pm)	Subiaco 13.12 (90)	def. by	West Perth 15.7 (97)	Medibank Stadium (crowd: 2,599)	Report
Saturday, 26 March (2:15 pm)	East Perth 12.17 (89)	def. by	South Fremantle 17.11 (113)	Medibank Stadium (crowd: 2,057)	Report
Saturday, 26 March (2:15 pm)	Claremont 17.16 (118)	def.	Swan Districts 12.7 (79)	Claremont Oval (crowd: 1,723)	Report
Saturday, 26 March (2:15 pm)	Perth 11.20 (86)	def. by	East Fremantle 21.9 (135)	Brownes Stadium (crowd: 1,459)	Report
	Bye; Peel Thunder
In the replay of the 2010 WAFL Grand Final, Claremont defeated Swan Districts by 39 points.

=== Round 3 ===
	Round 3
Friday, 1 April (7:40 pm)	South Fremantle 15.10 (100)	def. by	Perth 15.11 (101)	Fremantle Oval (crowd: 2,552)	Report
Saturday, 2 April (2:15 pm)	East Fremantle 12.12 (84)	def. by	Subiaco 15.13 (103)	East Fremantle Oval (crowd: 1,388)	Report
Saturday, 2 April (2:15 pm)	Claremont 19.10 (124)	def.	Peel Thunder 10.11 (71)	Claremont Oval (crowd: 1,220)	Report
Saturday, 2 April (2:15 pm)	West Perth 15.13 (103)	def.	Swan Districts 13.8 (86)	Arena Joondalup (crowd: 2,116)	Report
	Bye; East Perth
Andrew Browne (Claremont) gathered 36 possessions against Peel Thunder, a season record.

=== Round 4 ===
	Round 4
Saturday, 9 April (2:15 pm)	Peel Thunder 15.10 (100)	def. by	South Fremantle 16.17 (113)	Anniversary Park, Rockingham (crowd: 1,808)	Report
Saturday, 9 April (2:15 pm)	East Fremantle 6.16 (52)	def. by	West Perth 11.9 (75)	East Fremantle Oval (crowd: 1,531)	Report
Saturday, 9 April (2:15 pm)	East Perth 12.13 (85)	def. by	Claremont 20.7 (127)	Medibank Stadium (crowd: 2,116)	Report
Saturday, 9 April (2:15 pm)	Perth 12.11 (83)	def.	Subiaco 9.17 (71)	Brownes Stadium (crowd: 1,882)	Report
	Bye; Swan Districts

=== Round 5 ===
	Round 5
Saturday, 16 April (2:15 pm)	Swan Districts 13.10 (88)	def. by	South Fremantle 16.17 (113)	Steel Blue Oval (crowd: 1,573)	Report
Saturday, 16 April (2:15 pm)	Perth 20.14 (134)	def.	Peel Thunder 14.9 (93)	Brownes Stadium (crowd: 1,482)	Report
Saturday, 16 April (2:15 pm)	Subiaco 13.8 (86)	def. by	Claremont 13.14 (92)	Medibank Stadium (crowd: 2,087)	Report
Saturday, 16 April (2:15 pm)	West Perth 15.10 (100)	def.	East Perth 11.11 (77)	Arena Joondalup (crowd: 2,495)	Report
	Bye; East Fremantle

=== Round 6 (Anzac Day) ===
	Round 6
Friday, 22 April(4:15 pm)	Subiaco 16.11 (107)	def.	East Perth 13.13 (91)	Medibank Stadium (crowd: 4,457)	Report
Saturday, 23 April (2:15 pm)	West Perth 20.20 (140)	def.	Peel Thunder 7.6 (48)	Arena Joondalup (crowd: 2,039)	Report
Monday, 25 April (2:15 pm)	South Fremantle 14.18 (102)	def.	East Fremantle 10.13 (73)	Fremantle Oval (crowd: 3,925)	Report
Monday, 25 April (2:15 pm)	Swan Districts 18.12 (120)	def.	Perth 10.11 (71)	Steel Blue Oval (crowd: 2,460)	Report
	Bye; Claremont

=== Round 7 ===
	Round 7
Saturday, 30 April (2:15 pm)	Peel Thunder 15.15 (105)	def. by	Swan Districts 16.13 (109)	Bendigo Bank Stadium (crowd: 1,302)	Report
Saturday, 30 April (2:15 pm)	East Perth 12.12 (84)	def. by	East Fremantle 17.14 (116)	Medibank Stadium (crowd: 2,002)	Report
Saturday, 30 April (2:15 pm)	Claremont 14.18 (102)	def.	West Perth 10.13 (73)	Claremont Oval (crowd: 3,020)	Report
Saturday, 30 April (2:15 pm)	South Fremantle 18.12 (139)	def.	Subiaco 19.12 (126)	Fremantle Oval (crowd: 2,042)	Report
	Bye; Perth

=== Round 8 ===
	Round 8
Saturday, 7 May (2:15 pm)	East Perth 12.12 (84)	def. by	Swan Districts 15.14 (104)	Medibank Stadium (crowd: 2,770)	Report
Saturday, 7 May (2:15 pm)	East Fremantle 16.22 (118)	def.	Peel Thunder 14.7 (91)	East Fremantle Oval (crowd: 1,308)	Report
Saturday, 7 May (2:15 pm)	Perth 10.9 (69)	def. by	Claremont 23.14 (152)	Brownes Stadium (crowd: 1,779)	Report
Saturday, 7 May (2:15 pm)	West Perth 21.10 (136)	def.	South Fremantle 9.9 (63)	Arena Joondalup (crowd: 2,430)	Report
	Bye; Subiaco
Bradd Dalziell (East Fremantle) gathered 36 possessions against Peel Thunder, a season record.; Chad Jones (Claremont) kicked eight goals against Perth, a season record.; The game between Perth and Claremont was the 500th WAFL game played at Lathlain Park (Brownes Stadium).

=== Round 9 ===
	Round 9
Saturday, 14 May (2:15 pm)	Peel Thunder 12.13 (85)	def. by	East Perth 22.13 (145)	Bendigo Bank Stadium (crowd: 1,377)	Report
Saturday, 14 May (2:15 pm)	Swan Districts 11.7 (73)	def. by	Subiaco 18.10 (118)	Steel Blue Oval (crowd: 5,091)	Report
Saturday, 14 May (2:15 pm)	Claremont 11.14 (80)	def. by	East Fremantle 16.9 (105)	Claremont Oval (crowd: 1,702)	Report
Saturday, 14 May (2:15 pm)	Perth 13.7 (85)	def. by	West Perth 16.13 (109)	Brownes Stadium (crowd: 2,240)	Report
	Bye; South Fremantle
Josh Roberts (Swan Districts) played his 150th WAFL game.

=== Round 10 ===
	Round 10
Saturday, 21 May (2:15 pm)	Subiaco 16.14 (110)	def. by	Peel Thunder 19.15 (129)	Medibank Stadium (crowd: 2,092)	Report
Saturday, 21 May (2:15 pm)	East Fremantle 13.10 (88)	def.	Swan Districts 12.10 (82)	East Fremantle Oval (crowd: 1,507)	Report
Saturday, 21 May (2:15 pm)	South Fremantle 15.5 (95)	def. by	Claremont 18.11 (119)	Fremantle Oval (crowd: 1,702)	Report
Sunday, 22 May (2:15 pm)	East Perth 18.14 (122)	def.	Perth 7.11 (53)	Medibank Stadium (crowd: 2,729)	Report
	Bye; Subiaco
Peel Thunder recorded their first win for the season.

=== Round 11 ===
	Round 11
Saturday, 28 May (2:15 pm)	Swan Districts 14.11 (95)	def. by	Claremont 17.13 (115)	Steel Blue Oval (crowd: 2,096)	Report
Saturday, 28 May (2:15 pm)	Perth 20.7 (127)	def.	Subiaco 14.13 (97)	Brownes Stadium (crowd: 1,512)	Report
Saturday, 28 May (2:15 pm)	South Fremantle 13.18 (96)	def.	Peel Thunder 13.10 (88)	Fremantle Oval (crowd: 1,644)	Report
Sunday, 29 May (2:15 pm)	West Perth 10.11 (71)	def. by	East Fremantle 13.8 (86)	Arena Joondalup (crowd: 2,319)	Report
	Bye; East Perth

=== Round 12 (Foundation Day) ===
	Round 12 (Foundation Day)
Saturday, 4 June (2:15 pm)	Peel Thunder 16.8 (104)	def.	Perth 14.10 (94)	Bendigo Bank Stadium (crowd: 1,593)	Report
Monday, 6 June (2:15 pm)	East Perth 11.8 (74)	def. by	West Perth 12.14 (86)	Medibank Stadium (crowd: 5,767)	Report
Monday, 6 June (2:15 pm)	East Fremantle 11.5 (71)	def. by	South Fremantle 12.16 (88)	East Fremantle Oval (crowd: 7,531)	Report
Monday, 6 June (2:15 pm)	Claremont 17.12 (114)	def.	Subiaco 9.14 (68)	Claremont Oval (crowd: 2,319)	Report
	Bye; Swan Districts
Round 12 was the highest-attended round of the season, with 18,138 attending the four games held. The attendance between East Fremantle and South Fremantle at East Fremantle Oval (7,531 people) was also the highest of the home-and-away season.

=== Round 13 ===
	Round 13)
Saturday, 11 June (2:15 pm)	Peel Thunder 17.13 (115)	def.	West Perth 13.16 (94)	Bendigo Bank Stadium (crowd: 1,465)	Report
Saturday, 11 June (2:15 pm)	East Perth 7.10 (52)	def. by	Subiaco 14.10 (94)	Medibank Stadium (crowd: 2,722)	Report
Saturday, 11 June (2:15 pm)	South Fremantle 18.15 (123)	def. by	Swan Districts 22.8 (140)	Fremantle Oval (crowd: 1,727)	Report
Saturday, 11 June (2:15 pm)	East Fremantle 13.7 (85)	def.	Perth 10.8 (68)	East Fremantle Oval (crowd: 1,408)	Report
	Bye; Claremont
Darren Rumble (Subiaco) played his 150th WAFL game.

=== State game ===
Western Australia vs Queensland
Saturday, 18 June (2:15 pm)	Western Australia	def.	Queensland	Bendigo Bank Stadium (crowd: 3,260)	Report
1.8 (14); 8.10 (58); 14.14 (98); 16.17 (113)	Q1; Q2; Q3; Final	3.2 (20); 4.2 (26); 7.5 (47); 10.8 (68)	Simpson Medal: Josh Smith; Television broadcast: ABC1
Smith 5 Brabazon, Geappen, Thornton 2 Dell-Olio, Rory O'Brien 1	Goals	4 Zorko; 2 Clouston, Davey, Illet, Payne; 1 Abey, Shelton, Smith, Vearing
Western Australia played Queensland for the first time since 2008.

=== Round 14 ===
	Round 14)
Saturday, 25 June (2:15 pm)	South Fremantle 20.10 (130)	def.	East Perth 12.12 (84)	Fremantle Oval (crowd: 1,704)	Report
Saturday, 25 June (2:15 pm)	Swan Districts 7.13 (55)	def. by	West Perth 15.10 (104)	Steel Blue Oval (crowd: 2,518)	Report
Saturday, 25 June (2:15 pm)	Subiaco 16.8 (104)	def.	East Fremantle 11.15 (81)	Medibank Stadium (crowd: 2,215)	Report
Saturday, 25 June (2:15 pm)	Claremont 8.12 (60)	def. by	Perth 10.6 (66)	Claremont Oval (crowd: 1,352)	Report
	Bye; Peel Thunder
Kris Miller (South Fremantle) played his 250th WAFL game.

=== Round 15 ===
	Round 15)
Saturday, 2 July (2:15 pm)	East Perth 12.10 (82)	def.	Peel Thunder 10.9 (69)	Medibank Stadium (crowd: 1,476)	Report
Saturday, 2 July (2:15 pm)	West Perth 15.8 (98)	def.	Subiaco 13.5 (83)	Arena Joondalup (crowd: 1,671)	Report
Saturday, 2 July (2:15 pm)	Perth 12.8 (80)	def. by	Swan Districts 16.8 (104)	Brownes Stadium (crowd: 1,643)	Report
Sunday, 3 July (2:15 pm)	Claremont 15.12 (102)	def.	South Fremantle 15.9 (99)	Claremont Oval (crowd: 2,002)	Report
	Bye; East Fremantle

=== Round 16 ===
	Round 16)
Saturday, 9 July (2:15 pm)	Peel Thunder 14.12 (96)	def.	East Fremantle 9.17 (71)	Bendigo Bank Stadium (crowd: 1,477)	Report
Saturday, 9 July (2:15 pm)	West Perth 13.13 (91)	def.	Claremont 13.7 (85)	Arena Joondalup (crowd: 2,784)	Report
Saturday, 9 July (2:15 pm)	Subiaco 18.11 (119)	def. by	South Fremantle 16.15 (111)	Ports Oval, Esperance (crowd: 2,250)	Report
	Bye; East Perth, Perth, Swan Districts
The match between Subiaco and South Fremantle at Ports Oval was the first match at the venue, and the fourth overall in Esperance, with the other three being played at Esperance Oval.

=== Round 17 ===
	Round 17)
Saturday, 16 July (2:15 pm)	Swan Districts 9.16 (70)	def. by	Peel Thunder 21.7 (133)	Steel Blue Oval (crowd: 1,676)	Report
Saturday, 16 July (2:15 pm)	East Perth 18.15 (123)	def.	Perth 8.11 (59)	Medibank Stadium (crowd: 1,901)	Report
Saturday, 16 July (2:15 pm)	South Fremantle 18.10 (118)	def. by	West Perth 21.9 (135)	Fremantle Oval (crowd: 2,446)	Report
	Bye; Claremont, East Fremantle, Subiaco
Tallan Ames (Swan Districts) played his 150th WAFL game.

=== Round 18 ===
	Round 18)
Saturday, 23 July (2:15 pm)	Peel Thunder 12.8 (80)	def. by	Claremont 17.18 (120)	Bendigo Bank Stadium (crowd: 1,181)	Report
Saturday, 23 July (2:15 pm)	East Fremantle 18.6 (114)	def.	East Perth 17.8 (110)	East Fremantle Oval (crowd: 1,564)	Report
Saturday, 23 July (2:15 pm)	Subiaco 20.19 (139)	def.	Swan Districts 6.7 (43)	Medibank Stadium (crowd: 1,881)	Report
Saturday, 23 July (2:15 pm)	West Perth 14.11 (95)	def. by	Perth 19.10 (124)	Arena Joondalup (crowd: 1,839)	Report
	Bye; South Fremantle
Leith Teakle (East Fremantle) played his 150th WAFL game.

=== Round 19 ===
	Round 19)
Saturday, 30 July (2:15 pm)	Peel Thunder 10.11 (71)	def. by	Subiaco 17.13 (115)	Bendigo Bank Stadium (crowd: 1,113)	Report
Saturday, 30 July (2:15 pm)	Claremont 20.16 (136)	def.	East Perth 10.10 (70)	Claremont Oval (crowd: 1,922)	Report
Saturday, 30 July (2:15 pm)	Swan Districts 11.7 (73)	def. by	East Fremantle 27.13 (175)	Kevin Richards Memorial Oval, Karratha (crowd: 1,930)	Report
Saturday, 30 July (2:15 pm)	Perth 14.9 (93)	def. by	South Fremantle 15.18 (108)	Brownes Stadium (crowd: 3,669)	Report
	Bye; West Perth
David Crawford (Claremont) played his 150th game.; The match between Swan Districts and East Fremantle was originally scheduled to be played at Steel Blue Oval, but was moved to Kevin Richards Memorial Oval, Karratha, at the request of Swan Districts.

=== Round 20 ===
	Round 20)
Saturday, 6 August (2:15 pm)	Subiaco 13.11 (89)	def.	Perth 11.9 (75)	Medibank Stadium (crowd: 2,391)	Report
Saturday, 6 August (2:15 pm)	West Perth 10.14 (74)	def. by	South Fremantle 14.15 (99)	Arena Joondalup (crowd: 2,048)	Report
	Bye; Claremont, East Fremantle, East Perth, Peel Thunder, Swan Districts
Allistair Pickett (Subiaco) played his 200th WAFL game.; Gavin Statham umpired his 300th WAFL game.

=== Round 21 ===
	Round 21)
Saturday, 13 August (2:15 pm)	East Fremantle 15.8 (98)	def.	West Perth 11.13 (79)	Wonthella Park Oval, Geraldton (crowd: 2,299)	Report
Saturday, 13 August (2:15 pm)	Subiaco 18.12 (120)	def.	East Perth 8.12 (60)	Medibank Stadium (crowd: 1,807)	Report
Saturday, 13 August (2:15 pm)	South Fremantle 16.9 (105)	def.	Peel Thunder 12.16 (88)	Fremantle Oval (crowd: 1,632)	Report
Saturday, 13 August (2:15 pm)	Claremont 21.17 (143)	def.	Swan Districts 14.5 (89)	Claremont Oval (crowd: 1,812)	Report
	Bye; Perth

=== Round 22 ===
	Round 22)
Saturday, 20 August (2:15 pm)	Peel Thunder 12.15 (87)	def. by	Perth 15.7 (97)	Bendigo Bank Stadium (crowd: 2,299)	Report
Saturday, 20 August (2:15 pm)	West Perth 12.18 (90)	def. by	East Perth 18.9 (117)	Arena Joondalup (crowd: 4,727)	Report
Saturday, 20 August (2:15 pm)	Swan Districts 17.9 (111)	def.	South Fremantle 12.11 (83)	Steel Blue Oval (crowd: 1,616)	Report
Sunday, 21 August (2:15 pm)	East Fremantle 16.14 (110)	def.	Claremont 9.11 (65)	East Fremantle Oval (crowd: 2,249)	Report
	Bye; Subiaco
Andrew McCarrey (South Fremantle) played his 150th WAFL game.

=== Round 23 ===
	Round 23)
Saturday, 27 August (2:15 pm)	Claremont 25.11 (161)	def.	Peel Thunder 10.8 (68)	Claremont Oval (crowd: 1,444)	Report
Saturday, 27 August (2:15 pm)	Swan Districts 7.12 (54)	def. by	West Perth 13.14 (92)	Steel Blue Oval (crowd: 2,140)	Report
Saturday, 27 August (2:15 pm)	Subiaco 13.17 (95)	def.	East Fremantle 8.9 (57)	Medibank Stadium (crowd: 2,699)	Report
Saturday, 27 August (2:15 pm)	Perth 15.11 (101)	def.	East Perth 13.18 (86)	Brownes Stadium (crowd: 1,964)	Report
	Bye; South Fremantle
Josh Pearce and Dustin Burns (both West Perth) played their 150th WAFL games.

=== Round 24 ===
	Round 24)
Saturday, 3 September (2:15 pm)	Peel Thunder 5.12 (42)	v	Subiaco 16.14 (110)	Bendigo Bank Stadium (crowd: 1,306)	Report
Saturday, 3 September (2:15 pm)	East Perth 12.9 (81)	def. by	Claremont 16.11 (107)	Medibank Stadium (crowd: 1,732)	Report
Saturday, 3 September (2:15 pm)	Perth 14.10 (94)	def.	Swan Districts 12.17 (89)	Brownes Stadium (crowd: 1,860)	Report
Saturday, 3 September (2:15 pm)	South Fremantle 18.13 (121)	def.	East Fremantle 12.13 (85)	Brownes Stadium (crowd: 4,316)	Report
	Bye; West Perth

== Finals series ==
=== Semi-finals ===
	1st semi Final
Sunday, 11 September (2:15 pm)	Subiaco 24.18 (162)	v	South Fremantle 12.5 (77)	Medibank Stadium (crowd: 3,322)	Report

	2nd semi Final
Sunday, 1 September (2:15 pm)	Claremont 23.13 (151)	def.	West Perth 10.6 (66)	Claremont Oval (crowd: 3,312)	Report

=== Preliminary final ===
	Preliminary final
Sunday, 18 September (2:15 pm)	West Perth 5.11 (41)	v	Subiaco 8.8 (56)	Arena Joondalup (crowd: 2,306)	Report

=== Grand Final ===
2011 WAFL Grand Final
Sunday, 25 September 2:15pm	Claremont	def.	Subiaco	Patersons Stadium (crowd: 15,459)	Report
6.3 (39); 10.7 (67); 13.12 (90); 19.13 (127)	Q1; Q2; Q3; Final	4.3 (27); 6.6 (42); 8.9 (57); 10.11 (71)	Umpires: Craig Hendrie, Stuart Parry, Scott McPhee; Simpson Medal: Beau Wilkes; Television broadcast: ABC1
Wilkes 5 Gilligan 3 Handley, Richardson, Rudeforth 2 Crawford, Foster, Lee, Schammer, Weedon 1	Goals	3 Broadhurst, Headland; 2 Pickett; 1 Kerr, B. Stevenson,
Wilkes, Andrews, Mitchell, Gilligan, Murphy, B Jones, Foster	Best	Bristow, Horsley, Kerr, Blechynden, Headland
Murphy (head)	Injuries	Wheeler (head), Randall (ankle)
Reports	Headland (forceful front-on contact)
The attendance of 15,459 was the lowest for a WAFL Grand Final since 1944.; Claremont won their first premiership since 1996.

== Ladder ==
2011 WAFL ladder
Pos	Team	Pld	W	L	D	PF	PA	PP	Pts	
1	Claremont (P)	20	15	5	0	2249	1658	135.6	60	Finals series
2	West Perth	20	14	6	0	1948	1685	115.6	56	Finals series
3	Subiaco	20	12	8	0	2044	1719	118.9	48	Finals series
4	South Fremantle	20	12	8	0	2118	2006	105.6	48	Finals series
5	East Fremantle	20	11	9	0	1876	1826	102.7	44	
6	Perth	20	9	11	0	1760	2029	86.7	36	
7	East Perth	20	6	14	0	1838	2018	91.1	24	
8	Swan Districts	20	6	14	0	1771	2202	80.4	24	
9	Peel Thunder	20	5	15	0	1747	2208	79.1	20	

Source: WAFL Footy Facts
Rules for classification: 1) points; 2) percentage; 3) number of points for.
(P) Premiers
