= 2012 WAFL season =

Australian rules football season

- Teams: 9
- Premiers: Claremont; 12th premiership
- Minor premiers: Claremont; 15th minor premiership
- Sandover Medallist: Kane Mitchell (Claremont)
- Bernie Naylor Medallist: Ben Saunders (South Fremantle)

The 2012 WAFL season was the 128th season of the West Australian Football League and its various incarnations. The season opened on 17 March, with Subiaco hosting West Perth at Leederville Oval, and concluded with the 2012 WAFL Grand Final, in which Claremont defeated East Fremantle by 26 points. The 2012 Sandover Medal was won by Kane Mitchell of Claremont, while the leading goalkicker was South Fremantle's Ben Saunders.

== Pre-season News and Rule changes ==
On 1 February, it was announced that the West Australian Football Commission (WAFC) had signed a new three-year deal with sports company Burley-Sekem as the officially endorsed supplier of footballs to all WA competition, maintaining a strong relationship with Burley that dates back to 1907.

The WAFL implemented one major rule change in accordance with changes at AFL level in regard to the rushed behind rule:

- A free kick would be awarded against a player who intentionally rushes a behind over the attacking team's goal or behind line or into a goal post. The umpires were to give the defender the benefit of the doubt and the point would be awarded if the defender was deemed to be under sufficient pressure.

On 27 February the following amendments were accepted by the WAFC Football Affairs Committee:

- An annual 3 per cent increase in the WAFL Salary Cap, starting in 2012 to $217,000
- Due to widespread support for retention of loyal players, a maximum of $10,000 outside of the Salary Cap could be paid to one veteran player (one who had played 100 or more games at one WAFL club). This amendment ran on a trial basis.
- A fixed fine for late lodgement of Salary Cap documents plus a daily non-compliance fine of $50 per day
- Introduction of Weekly League match prizes of up to $750.

== Clubs ==
Club	Coach	Captain	Best and fairest	Leading goalkicker
Claremont	Marc Webb	Andrew Browne		
East Fremantle	Steve Malaxos	Mark McGough		
East Perth	Tony Micale	Michael Swan		
Peel Thunder	Trevor Williams	Brendon Jones		
Perth	Damien McMahon	Ross Young		
South Fremantle	Paul Hasleby	Ryan Cook		
Subiaco	Chris Waterman	Aidan Parker		
Swan Districts	Greg Harding	Josh Roberts		
West Perth	Bill Monaghan	Jason Salecic		

== Home-and-away season ==
=== Round 1 ===
	Round 1
Saturday, 17 March (2:10 pm)	Subiaco 13.7 (85)	def.	East Perth 8.13 (61)	Leederville Oval (crowd: 2005)	Report
Sunday, 18 March (2:10 pm)	Perth 8.11 (59)	def. by	Claremont 15.11 (101)	Lathlain Park (crowd: 1631)	Report
	Bye; East Fremantle, Peel Thunder, Swan Districts, South Fremantle, West Perth

=== Round 2 ===
	Round 2
Saturday, 24 March (2:10 pm)	West Perth 14.7 (91)	def. by	Swan Districts 19.13 (127)	Arena Joondalup (crowd: 2457)	Report
Saturday, 24 March (2:10 pm)	Peel Thunder 13.8 (86)	def. by	Subiaco 19.17 (131)	Rushton Park (crowd: 1582)	Report
Saturday, 24 March (2:10 pm)	Claremont 16.7 (103)	def.	East Perth 15.9 (99)	Claremont Oval (crowd: 2035)	Report
Saturday, 24 March (6:40 pm)	South Fremantle 19.14 (128)	def.	Perth 19.6 (120)	Fremantle Oval (crowd: 1459)	Report
	Bye; East Fremantle
South Fremantle trailed Perth by 50 points at three-quarter time. In the last quarter the Bulldogs kicked 10 goals 4 behinds to a solitary goal to win by 8 points.; Former Brisbane Lions and Fremantle player Des Headland kicked eight goals for Subiaco against Peel Thunder.

=== Round 3 ===
	Round 3
Friday, 30 March (6:40 pm)	South Fremantle 15.15 (105)	def. by	Subiaco 18.5 (113)	Fremantle Oval (crowd: 2298)	Report
Saturday, 31 March (2:10 pm)	Perth 12.12 (84)	def.	Peel Thunder 12.7 (79)	Lathlain Park (crowd: 1536)	Report
Saturday, 31 March (2:10 pm)	East Fremantle 19.8 (122)	def.	Claremont 13.10 (88)	East Fremantle Oval (crowd: 1634)	Report
Saturday, 31 March (2:10 pm)	East Perth 11.12 (78)	def. by	West Perth 13.8 (86)	Leederville Oval (crowd: 2531)	Report
	Bye; Swan Districts
Last season's Bernie Naylor Medallist Blake Broadhurst (Subiaco) kicked six goals in his first game back after a limited pre-season.

=== Round 4 ===
	Round 4
Friday, 6 April (4:15 pm)	East Perth 14.11 (95)	def.	Perth 10.8 (68)	Leederville Oval (crowd: 3774)	Report
Saturday, 7 April (2:10 pm)	Peel Thunder 13.13 (91)	def. by	East Fremantle 15.21 (111)	Rushton Park (crowd: 1573)	Report
Monday, 9 April (2:10 pm)	Claremont 15.13 (103)	def.	West Perth 9.4 (58)	Claremont Oval (crowd: 2212)	Report
Monday, 9 April (2:10 pm)	Swan Districts 17.20 (122)	def.	South Fremantle 15.9 (99)	Bassendean Oval (crowd: 4672)	Report
	Bye; Subiaco
Subiaco played in the Foxtel Cup against Port Adelaide at AAMI Stadium. The Magpies won 7.9 (51) to 5.6 (36).

=== Round 5 ===
	Round 5
Friday, 13 April (6:45 pm)	Subiaco 10.16 (76)	def.	East Fremantle 9.12 (66)	Leederville Oval (crowd: 2085)	Report
Saturday, 14 April (2:10 pm)	Swan Districts 10.16 (76)	def. by	Peel Thunder 13.12 (90)	Bassendean Oval (crowd: 1451)	Report
Sunday, 15 April (2:10 pm)	West Perth 12.13 (85)	def.	Perth 10.13 (73)	Arena Joondalup (crowd: 2217)	Report
Sunday, 15 April (2:10 pm)	South Fremantle 9.13 (67)	def. by	Claremont 18.19 (127)	Fremantle Oval (crowd: 2071)	Report
	Bye; East Perth

=== Round 6 ===
	Round 6
Saturday, 21 April (2:10 pm)	Peel Thunder 12.10 (82)	def. by	South Fremantle 23.17 (155)	Rushton Park (crowd: 1600)	Report
Saturday, 21 April (2:10 pm)	Perth 10.16 (76)	def.	Subiaco 11.7 (73)	Lathlain Park (crowd: 1671)	Report
Saturday, 21 April (2:10 pm)	Claremont 9.16 (70)	def. by	Swan Districts 11.10 (76)	Claremont Oval (crowd: 1653)	Report
Saturday, 21 April (2:10 pm)	East Fremantle 13.11 (89)	def. by	East Perth 14.9 (93)	East Fremantle Oval (crowd: 1731)	Report
	Bye; West Perth
West Perth defeated ACT-based Ainslie 13.12 (90) to 7.6 (48) to advance to the quarterfinal stage of the 2012 Foxtel Cup.; Perth captain Ross Young had 37 disposals, took 11 marks and four inside-50s in their 3-point win against Subiaco.

=== Round 7 ===
	Round 7
Saturday, 28 April (2:10 pm)	West Perth 13.17 (95)	def.	Peel Thunder 11.14 (80)	Arena Joondalup (crowd: 1724)	Report
Saturday, 28 April (2:10 pm)	East Fremantle 18.18 (126)	def.	South Fremantle 6.5 (41)	East Fremantle Oval (crowd: 2408)	Report
Saturday, 28 April (2:10 pm)	Swan Districts 21.9 (135)	def.	Perth 14.14 (98)	Bassendean Oval (crowd: 2553)	Report
Saturday, 28 April (4:30 pm)	Subiaco 5.5 (35)	def. by	East Perth 9.12 (66)	Leederville Oval (crowd: 2178)	Report
	Bye; Claremont
Claremont defeated West Adelaide 20.10 (130) to 4.5 (29) in the 2012 Foxtel Cup.; Andrew Strijk (West Perth) played his 100th game for the Falcons.

=== Round 8 ===
	Round 8
Saturday, 5 May (2:10 pm)	East Perth 15.16 (106)	def.	Swan Districts 9.17 (71)	Manjimup (crowd: 1019)	Report
Saturday, 5 May (2:10 pm)	Perth 13.8 (86)	def. by	East Fremantle 17.10 (112)	Lathlain Park (crowd: 1509)	Report
Saturday, 5 May (2:10 pm)	South Fremantle 16.12 (108)	def.	West Perth 11.16 (82)	Fremantle Oval (crowd: 1422)	Report
Saturday, 5 May (2:10 pm)	Subiaco 14.11 (95)	def. by	Claremont 22.11 (143)	Leederville Oval (crowd: 1774)	Report
	Bye; Peel Thunder
Hayden North (South Fremantle) played his 150th game for the Bulldogs.

=== Round 9 ===
	Round 9
Saturday, 12 May (2:10 pm)	West Perth 13.7 (85)	def. by	East Fremantle 12.15 (87)	Arena Joondalup (crowd: 1801)	Report
Saturday, 12 May (2:10 pm)	Peel Thunder 12.5 (77)	def. by	Claremont 22.21 (153)	Rushton Park (crowd: 1309)	Report
Saturday, 12 May (2:10 pm)	East Perth 17.8 (110)	def.	South Fremantle 15.8 (98)	Leederville Oval (crowd: 2011)	Report
Saturday, 12 May (2:10 pm)	Swan Districts 20.16 (136)	def.	Subiaco 15.10 (100)	Bassendean Oval (crowd: 2052)	Report
	Bye; Perth
East Perth won their first game against South Fremantle since Round 23, 2004, ending a run of 16 consecutive losses to the Bulldogs.

=== Round 10 ===
	Round 10
Saturday, 19 May (2:10 pm)	West Perth 14.16 (100)	def.	Subiaco 12.6 (78)	Arena Joondalup (crowd: 1933)	Report
Saturday, 19 May (2:10 pm)	Peel Thunder 18.6 (114)	def. by	East Perth 25.14 (164)	Rushton Park (crowd: 1466)	Report
Saturday, 19 May (2:10 pm)	Claremont 24.14 (158)	def.	Perth 11.4 (70)	Claremont Oval (crowd: 2302)	Report
Saturday, 19 May (2:10 pm)	East Fremantle 9.9 (63)	def. by	Swan Districts 15.15 (105)	East Fremantle Oval (crowd: 1794)	Report
	Bye; South Fremantle

=== State game ===
South Australia vs Western Australia
Saturday, 26 May (12:40 pm)	South Australia	def.	Western Australia	Glenelg Oval (crowd: 2843)	Report
4.3 (27); 10.6 (66); 11.8 (74); 15.11 (101)	Q1; Q2; Q3; Final	4.1 (25); 7.2 (44); 11.8 (74); 13.9 (87)	Simpson Medal: Paul Johnson; Television broadcast: ABC1
Grocke 7 Kirkby 2 Jericho, Schiller, Gray, Clayton, Liddle, Schmidt 1	Goals	4 Handley; 3 Richardson, Medhurst; 2 Smith; 1 Wulff
Grocke, Schmidt, Liddle, Thomas, Jarrad, Boyd, Webber	Best	Johnson, Hams, Handley, Wulff, Blackwell, Parker, Medhurst, Mitchell
12 players made their debut for Western Australia, including captain Craig Wulff and Simpson Medallist Paul Johnson (East Perth)

=== Round 11 (Rivalry Round) ===
	Round 11
Saturday, 2 June (2:10 pm)	Claremont 11.18 (84)	def. by	Peel Thunder 14.14 (98)	Claremont Oval (crowd: 1352)	Report
Sunday, 3 May (2:10 pm)	Perth 15.8 (98)	def. by	Swan Districts 22.12 (144)	Lathlain Park (crowd: 2425)	Report
Monday, 4 June (2:10 pm)	West Perth 15.9 (99)	drew with	East Perth 15.9 (99)	Arena Joondalup (crowd: 4905)	Report
Monday, 4 June (2:10 pm)	South Fremantle 15.12 (102)	def. by	East Fremantle 16.14 (110)	Fremantle Oval (crowd: 6838)	Report
	Bye; Subiaco
Ashley Hansen (Swan Districts) booted seven goals, and teammate Matt Riggio had 37 disposals along with three goals in a big win over Perth.

=== Round 12 ===
	Round 12
Saturday, 9 June (2:10 pm)	East Fremantle 21.12 (138)	def.	Peel Thunder 7.9 (51)	East Fremantle Oval (crowd: 1452)	Report
Saturday, 9 June (2:10 pm)	Subiaco 9.10 (64)	def. by	Perth 20.14 (134)	Leederville Oval (crowd: 1946)	Report
Saturday, 9 June (2:10 pm)	Swan Districts 18.12 (120)	def.	South Fremantle 15.16 (106)	Bassendean Oval (crowd: 2897)	Report
Sunday, 10 June (2:10 pm)	East Perth 13.13 (91)	def.	Claremont 13.12 (90)	Leederville Oval (crowd: 1837)	Report
	Bye; West Perth
Rob Young (East Fremantle) played his 100th game and kicked four goals.; Perth’s win over Subiaco is their 1,000th in WAFL football. They are the second last of the six WAFL teams from before 1925 to reach this milestone, with Subiaco at the close of 2013 requiring six more wins.

=== Round 13 ===
	Round 13
Saturday, 16 June (2:10 pm)	Peel Thunder 12.14 (86)	def. by	Swan Districts 27.15 (177)	Rushton Park (crowd: 1697)	Report
Saturday, 16 June (2:10 pm)	Perth 8.16 (64)	def. by	West Perth 16.10 (106)	Lathlain Park (crowd: 3225)	Report
Saturday, 16 June (2:10 pm)	East Fremantle 10.19 (79)	def. by	Subiaco 13.7 (85)	East Fremantle Oval (crowd: 1741)	Report
Saturday, 16 June (2:10 pm)	South Fremantle 8.10 (58)	def. by	East Perth 16.21 (117)	Fremantle Oval (crowd: 1651)	Report
	Bye; Claremont

=== Round 14 ===
	Round 14
Saturday, 23 June (2:10 pm)	West Perth 10.14 (74)	def. by	East Fremantle 19.12 (126)	Kalannie (crowd: 1726)	Report
Saturday, 23 June (2:10 pm)	Subiaco 15.6 (96)	def. by	Claremont 16.13 (109)	Leederville Oval (crowd: 2111)	Report
Saturday, 23 June (2:10 pm)	Swan Districts 16.18 (114)	def.	East Perth 13.9 (87)	Bassendean Oval (crowd: 3417)	Report
Sunday, 24 June (2:10 pm)	South Fremantle 15.15 (105)	def. by	Peel Thunder 21.8 (134)	Fremantle Oval (crowd: 1643)	Report
	Bye; Perth
In a big weekend of milestones, Peel Thunder captain Brendon Jones celebrated his 150th game with 34 disposals in a 29-point win. It was Mark Moody’s first win as senior coach and Peel’s biggest with fewer scoring shots.; Michael Swan (East Perth) played his 150th game.

=== Round 15 (NAIDOC Week) ===
	Round 15
Saturday, 30 June (2:10 pm)	East Perth 7.9 (51)	def. by	Subiaco 12.16 (88)	Leederville Oval (crowd: 2372)	Report
Saturday, 30 June (2:10 pm)	Swan Districts 9.17 (71)	def. by	West Perth 11.13 (79)	Bassendean Oval (crowd: 2319)	Report
Sunday, 1 July (2:10 pm)	Claremont 17.17 (119)	def.	South Fremantle 10.4 (64)	Claremont Oval (crowd: 1922)	Report
Sunday, 1 July (2:10 pm)	East Fremantle 15.16 (106)	def.	Perth 13.9 (87)	East Fremantle Oval (crowd: 1819)	Report
	Bye; Peel Thunder
Tim Geappen (Swan Districts) played his 100th game.

=== Round 16 ===
	Round 16
Saturday, 7 July (2:10 pm)	Claremont 19.17 (131)	def.	Swan Districts 5.4 (34)	Claremont Oval (crowd: 1919)	Report
Saturday, 7 July (2:10 pm)	East Perth 17.19 (121)	def.	Peel Thunder 14.8 (92)	Leederville Oval (crowd: 1571)	Report
Saturday, 7 July (2:10 pm)	Perth 18.12 (120)	def.	South Fremantle 12.14 (86)	Lathlain Park (crowd: 1744)	Report
	Bye; East Fremantle, Subiaco, West Perth
Perth and South Fremantle contested the Cable-Michael Cup for the first time. Former Western Bulldogs player Brennan Stack (Perth) kicked five goals.; Graham Jetta (Swan Districts) was charged with rough conduct and suspended for one match.

=== Round 17 ===
	Round 17
Saturday, 14 July (2:10 pm)	East Fremantle 20.16 (136)	def.	East Perth 10.12 (72)	East Fremantle Oval (crowd: 1,809)	Report
Saturday, 14 July (2:10 pm)	South Fremantle 15.12 (102)	def. by	West Perth 15.15 (105)	Fremantle Oval (crowd: -)	Report
Saturday, 14 July (2:10 pm)	Subiaco 9.7 (61)	def. by	Peel Thunder 15.9 (99)	Leederville Oval (crowd: 1,459)	Report
	Bye; Claremont, Perth, Swan Districts
Claremont defeated Port Melbourne 13.10 (88) to 6.2 (38) to advance to the Grand Final of the 2012 Foxtel Cup.

=== Round 18 ===
	Round 18
Saturday, 21 July (2:10 pm)	West Perth 7.5 (47)	def. by	Claremont 26.10 (166)	Arena Joondalup (crowd: 2000)
Saturday, 21 July (2:10 pm)	Peel Thunder 12.10 (82)	def. by	Perth 15.26 (116)	Rushton Park (crowd: 1415)
Saturday, 21 July (2:10 pm)	Subiaco 12.9 (81)	def. by	South Fremantle 14.17 (101)	Leederville Oval (crowd: 1472)
Saturday, 21 July (2:10 pm)	Swan Districts 11.7 (73)	def. by	East Fremantle 20.16 (136)	Bassendean Oval (crowd: 2360)
	Bye; East Perth

=== Round 19 ===
	Round 19
Saturday, 28 July (2:10 pm)	Peel Thunder 8.11 (59)	def. by	West Perth 25.9 (159)	Rushton Park (crowd: 1333)
Saturday, 28 July (2:10 pm)	Perth 10.16 (76)	def. by	East Perth 17.11 (113)	Lathlain Park (crowd: 2116)
Saturday, 28 July (2:10 pm)	Claremont 19.10 (124)	def.	East Fremantle 4.8 (32)	Claremont Oval (crowd: 2851)
Saturday, 28 July (2:10 pm)	Subiaco 13.5 (83)	def. by	Swan Districts 17.14 (116)	Leederville Oval (crowd: 2157)
	Bye; South Fremantle
In a Grand Final preview, Claremont crush the Sharks’ attack after quarter-time, kicking 15.8 (98) to 2.4 (16).

=== Round 20 ===
	Round 20
Saturday, 4 August (2:10 pm)	Swan Districts 22.14 (146)	def.	Peel Thunder 7.5 (47)	Bassendean Oval (crowd: 1270)
Sunday, 5 August (2:10 pm)	South Fremantle 16.12 (108)	def.	Perth 12.12 (84)	Fremantle Oval (crowd: 1447)
	Bye; Claremont, East Fremantle, East Perth, Subiaco, West Perth

=== Round 21 ===
	Round 21
Saturday, 11 August (2:10 pm)	West Perth 14.14 (98)	def. by	Subiaco 15.10 (100)	Arena Joondalup (crowd: 6044)
Saturday, 11 August (2:10 pm)	Claremont 20.12 (132)	def.	Peel Thunder 7.9 (51)	Claremont Oval (crowd: 1208)
Saturday, 11 August (2:10 pm)	East Fremantle 15.15 (105)	def. by	South Fremantle 16.13 (109)	East Fremantle Oval (crowd: 2378)
Saturday, 11 August (2:10 pm)	East Perth 17.7 (109)	def. by	Perth 19.12 (126)	Leederville Oval (crowd: 1929)
	Bye; Swan Districts

=== Round 22 ===
	Round 22
Friday, 17 August (6:40 pm)	South Fremantle 13.7 (85)	def. by	Swan Districts 17.18 (120)	Fremantle Oval (crowd: 2047)
Saturday, 18 August (2:10 pm)	Perth 5.8 (38)	def. by	Claremont 29.13 (187)	Lathlain Park (crowd: 1633)
Saturday, 18 August (2:10 pm)	Subiaco 11.9 (75)	def. by	East Perth 15.25 (115)	Leederville Oval (crowd: 2390)
Sunday, 19 August (2:10 pm)	East Fremantle 23.15 (153)	def.	West Perth 7.8 (50)	East Fremantle Oval (crowd: 1928)
	Bye; Peel Thunder

=== Round 23 ===
	Round 23
Saturday, 25 August (2:10 pm)	West Perth 13.8 (86)	def. by	South Fremantle 15.5 (95)	Arena Joondalup (crowd: 1,511)	Report
Saturday, 25 August (2:10 pm)	Peel Thunder 20.15 (135)	def.	Subiaco 12.11 (83)	Rushton Park (crowd: 1,044)	Report
Saturday, 25 August (2:10 pm)	East Perth 14.8 (92)	def. by	East Fremantle 15.9 (99)	Leederville Oval (crowd: 1,995)	Report
Saturday, 25 August (2:10 pm)	Swan Districts 14.8 (92)	def.	Claremont 12.11 (83)	Bassendean Oval (crowd: 3,002)	Report
	Bye; Perth
Jason Salecic (West Perth) played his 200th game.

=== Round 24 ===
	Round 24
Saturday, 1 September (2:10 pm)	Perth 12.9 (81)	def. by	Swan Districts 14.16 (100)	Lathlain Park (crowd: 2,028)
Saturday, 1 September (2:10 pm)	Claremont 23.13 (151)	def.	Subiaco 7.8 (50)	Claremont Oval (crowd: 1,752)
Saturday, 1 September (2:10 pm)	Peel Thunder 10.9 (69)	def. by	East Fremantle 18.15 (123)	Rushton Park (crowd: 1,329)
Saturday, 1 September (2:10 pm)	East Perth 12.12 (84)	def. by	West Perth 14.14 (98)	Leederville Oval (crowd: 2,605)
	Bye; South Fremantle

== Ladder ==
2012 ladder
Pos	Team	Pld	W	L	D	PF	PA	PP	Pts
1	Claremont (P)	20	15	5	0	2422	1416	171.0	60
2	Swan Districts	20	15	5	0	2155	1819	118.5	60
3	East Fremantle	20	14	6	0	2119	1653	128.2	56
4	East Perth	20	11	8	1	1962	1815	108.1	46
5	West Perth	20	9	10	1	1744	1938	90.0	38
6	South Fremantle	20	7	13	0	1922	2183	88.0	28
7	Subiaco	20	7	13	0	1652	2027	81.5	28
8	Perth	20	6	14	0	1758	2171	81.0	24
9	Peel Thunder	20	5	15	0	1702	2414	70.5	20

Source: WAFL Footy Facts
Rules for classification: 1) points; 2) percentage; 3) number of points for.
(P) Premiers

== Finals ==
=== Semi-finals ===
	First semi-final
Saturday, 8 September (2:10 pm)	East Fremantle 16.15 (111)	def.	East Perth 11.8 (74)	East Fremantle Oval (crowd: 3,557)

	Second semi-final
Saturday, 8 September (2:10 pm)	Claremont 17.16 (118)	def.	Swan Districts 14.2 (86)	Claremont Oval (crowd: 3,865)

=== Preliminary final ===
	Preliminary final
Sunday, 16 September (2:10 pm)	Swan Districts 11.8 (74)	def. by	East Fremantle 13.23 (101)	Bassendean Oval (crowd: 5,342)	Report

=== Grand Final ===
Sunday, 23 September (2:15 pm)	Claremont	def.	East Fremantle	Subiaco Oval (crowd: 18,612)
8.6 (54); 11.11 (77); 13.13 (91); 18.16 (124)	Q1; Q2; Q3; Final	1.1 (7); 7.5 (47); 13.6 (84); 15.8 (98)	Umpires: Scott McPhee, Todd Keating, Justin Orr; Simpson Medal: Paul Medhurst (Claremont); Television broadcast: ABC1

== See also ==
- 2012 Foxtel Cup
