= 2012 WAFL Grand Final =

West Australian local football grand tournament

Claremont	East Fremantle
18.16 (124)	15.8 (98)
- Date: 23 September 2012
- Stadium: Patersons Stadium
- Attendance: 18,612

Accolades
- Simpson Medallist: Paul Medhurst (Claremont)

Broadcast in Australia
- Network: ABC1 (television); 720 ABC (radio); ABC Grandstand (radio/online)

The 2012 WAFL Grand Final was an Australian rules football game contested between the Claremont Football Club and the East Fremantle Football Club on Sunday 23 September 2012 at Patersons Stadium, to determine the premier team of the West Australian Football League (WAFL) for the 2012 season. Claremont won an exciting game by 26 points - 18.16 (124) to 15.8 (98) - and Paul Medhurst of Claremont was awarded the Simpson Medal. The win, which gave Claremont's its 12th WAFL premiership, was also the first time the Tigers had won successive flags since their 1938-1940 hat-trick.

== Background ==
Claremont, the reigning premiers, finished the home-and-away rounds on top of the ladder with 15 wins and a large percentage. The Tigers advanced directly to the Grand Final after defeating Swan Districts in the Second Semi-final.

East Fremantle finished third at the end of the home-and-away rounds with 14 wins. The Sharks defeated East Perth in the First Semi-final and then Swan Districts in the Preliminary Final to advance to the Grand Final. This was the first time the Sharks had made it to the Grand Final since 2000, and their most recent Grand Final victory was in 1998.

In the lead-up to the Grand Final, Claremont captain Andrew Browne failed a fitness test on his injured left hamstring, and deputy Luke Blackwell was appointed to lead the side.

== Teams ==
=== Claremont ===
FB:	Jesse Laurie	David Crawford	Jeremy McGovern
HB:	Aaron Holt	James Thomson	Lewis Stevenson
C:	Tom Swift	Nick Suban	Kane Mitchell
HF:	Rory Walton	Tom Lee	Jake Murphy
FF:	Ian Richardson	Chad Jones	Brad Nisbett
R:	Mitch Andrews	Luke Blackwell (c)	Byron Schammer
I:	Paul Medhurst	Andrew Foster	Gerrick Weedon
I:	Trinity Handley		
Coach:	Marc Webb		

=== East Fremantle ===
FB:	Brad Cooper	Mitch Brown	Steven Dodd
HB:	James Bayliss	Tom Howlett	Andrew Stephen
C:	Bradd Dalziell	Mark McGough (c)	Sean Henson
HF:	Sam Menegola	Luke Weller	Brad Dick
FF:	Brock O'Brien	Rob Young	Jacob Brennan
R:	Jonathan Griffin	Richard Hadley	Koby Stevens
I:	Jayden Schofield	Rory O'Brien	Leith Teakle
I:	Cameron Sutcliffe		
Coach:	Steve Malaxos		

== Match report ==
East Fremantle closed to within one point at the start of the final quarter when Young kicked his second, but Claremont managed to steady and kick five of the last six goals to run out comfortable winners in the end.

The defeat was especially bitter for the Sharks as, for the second time since 2000, they lost Grand Finals in all three grades; they had lost earlier to Claremont in the Reserves, and were defeated for the Colts premiership by South Fremantle.

== Match details ==
2012 WAFL Grand Final
Sunday, 23 September 2:15pm	Claremont	def.	East Fremantle	Patersons Stadium (crowd: 18,612)	Report
8.6 (54); 11.11 (77); 13.13 (91); 18.16 (124)	Q1; Q2; Q3; Final	1.1 (7); 7.5 (47); 13.6 (84); 15.8 (98)	Umpires: Justin Orr, Todd Keating, Scott McPhee; Simpson Medal: Paul Medhurst; Television broadcast: ABC1
Medhurst 6 Richardson, Mitchell 3 Foster 2 Schammer, Blackwell, Lee, Jones 1	Goals	3 Griffin, Young; 2 B. O'Brien; 1 Menegola, Teakle, Stevens, McGough, Brennan, R. O'Brien, Dalziell
Medhurst, Blackwell, Mitchell, Richardson, Schammer, Foster, Walton	Best	Griffin, Dalziell, Brown, Howlett, Dodd, Young, Menegola
Foster (knee)	Injuries	Bayliss (elbow)
Handley (rough conduct)	Reports	Young (rough conduct)
