= 2011 WAFL Grand Final =

Claremont	Subiaco
19.13 (127)	10.11 (71)
- Date: 25 September 2011
- Stadium: Patersons Stadium
- Attendance: 15,459

Accolades
- Simpson Medal: Beau Wilkes (Claremont)

Broadcast in Australia
- Network: ABC1 (television); 720 ABC (radio); ABC Grandstand (radio/online)

The 2011 WAFL Grand Final was an Australian rules football game contested between the Claremont Football Club and the Subiaco Football Club, on 25 September 2011 at Patersons Stadium, to determine the premier team of the West Australian Football League (WAFL) for the 2011 season. Claremont won the game by 56 points, 19.13 (127) to 10.11 (71), with Beau Wilkes of Claremont winning the Simpson Medal as best on ground. The attendance of 15,459 was the lowest since 8,991 people attended the 1944 Grand Final.

== Lead-up to the grand final ==
The two teams had previously met twice in the season, with Claremont winning both encounters.

=== Claremont ===
Claremont had lost by one point to Swan Districts in the previous year's Grand Final, and finished minor premiers in 2011, winning fifteen games and losing five. The club won eight of their first ten matches.

=== Subiaco ===
The club won only three of their first ten matches, but drew back later in the season to win nine of their last ten matches, including the first semi-final, against South Fremantle, and preliminary final, against West Perth.

	Claremont	Subiaco
Rd.1	East Fremantle	BYE
Rd.2	Swan Districts	West Perth
Rd.3	Peel Thunder	East Fremantle
Rd.4	East Perth	Perth
Rd.5	Subiaco	Claremont
Rd.6	BYE	East Perth
Rd.7	West Perth	South Fremantle
Rd.8	Perth	BYE
Rd.9	East Fremantle	Swan Districts
Rd.10	South Fremantle	Peel Thunder
Rd.11	Swan Districts	Perth
Rd.12	Subiaco	Claremont
Rd.13	BYE	East Perth
Rd.14	Perth	East Fremantle
Rd.15	South Fremantle	West Perth
Rd.16	West Perth	South Fremantle
Rd.17	BYE	BYE
Rd.18	Peel Thunder	Swan Districts
Rd.19	East Perth	Peel Thunder
Rd.20	BYE	Perth
Rd.21	Swan Districts	East Perth
Rd.22	East Fremantle	BYE
Rd.23	Peel Thunder	East Fremantle
Rd.24	East Perth	Peel Thunder
SF	West Perth	South Fremantle
SF	DNP	West Perth
GF	Subiaco	Claremont
Legend: Win Loss

== Teams ==
=== Claremont ===
FB:	Clancy Rudeforth (c)	Brandon Franz	Brett Jones
HB:	Alroy Gilligan	David Crawford	Trinity Handley
C:	Tom Swift	Kane Mitchell	Lewis Stevenson
HF:	Gerrick Weedon	Beau Wilkes	Ian Richardson
FF:	Andrew Foster	Chad Jones	Luke Blackwell
R:	Mitch Andrews	Andrew Browne	Byron Schammer
I:	Jake Murphy	Clay McLernon	Tom Lee
I:	Jesse Laurie		
Coach:	Simon McPhee		

=== Subiaco ===
FB:	Robert Forrest	Darren Rumble	Kane Bloxsidge
HB:	Rhett Kerr	Aidan Parker (c)	Des Headland
C:	Shaun Hildebrandt	Chris Phelan	Pat Hassett
HF:	Kyal Horsley	Bradley Stevenson	Jason Bristow
FF:	Danny Hughes	Blake Broadhurst	Reece Blechynden
R:	Clancy Wheeler	Adam Cockie	Abe Davey
I:	Ben Randall	Allistair Pickett	Scott Worthington
I:	George Hampson		
Coach:	Chris Waterman		

== Match ==
2011 WAFL Grand Final
Saturday, 25 September 2:15pm	Claremont	def.	Subiaco	Patersons Stadium (crowd: 15,459)	Report
6.3 (39); 10.7 (67); 13.12 (90); 19.13 (127)	Q1; Q2; Q3; Final	4.3 (27); 6.6 (42); 8.9 (57); 10.11 (71)	Umpires: Hendrie, Parry, McPhee; Simpson Medal: Beau Wilkes; Television broadcast: ABC1
Wilkes 5 Gilligan 3 Handley, Richardson, Rudeforth 2 Crawford, Foster, Lee, Schammer, Weedon 1	Goals	3 Broadhurst, Headland; 2 Pickett; 1 Kerr, B. Stevenson,
Wilkes, Andrews, Mitchell, Gilligan, Murphy, B Jones, Foster	Best	Bristow, Horsley, Kerr, Blechynden, Headland
Murphy (head)	Injuries	Wheeler (head), Randall (ankle)
Reports	Headland (forceful front-on contact)
