= 2010 WAFL Grand Final =

Australian football game

Swan Districts	Claremont
14.16 (100)	14.15 (99)
- Date: 19 September 2010
- Stadium: Subiaco Oval
- Attendance: 24,638

Accolades
- Simpson Medallist: Andrew Krakouer (Swan Districts)

Broadcast in Australia
- Network: ABC1 (television); ABC Radio Perth (radio); ABC Grandstand (radio/online)

The 2010 WAFL Grand Final was an Australian rules football game contested between the Claremont Football Club and the Swan Districts Football Club on 19 September 2010 at Subiaco Oval, to determine the premier team of the West Australian Football League (WAFL) for the 2010 season. Swan Districts won the game by one point, 14.16 (100) to 14.15 (99), with Andrew Krakouer winning the Simpson Medal for best on ground. The attendance of 24,600 was the largest for a WAFL game since the 2002 Grand Final.

== Build-up and history ==
Claremont had dominated the 2010 home and away season by winning seventeen and drawing one of their twenty matches. They then defeated Swan Districts in the major semi final on Sunday 5 September to advance to the Premiership decider. The Tigers were aiming for their first premiership since 1996.

Swan Districts competed in a Grand Final for the second time in three years, following a long period where the club had lingered at the lower reaches of the WAFL table and had serious financial problems threaten its very existence. After losing to Claremont in the first week of the finals, they defeated East Perth in the preliminary final to reach the league’s showpiece game, whilst Brian Dawson aimed to be only the third coach after Haydn Bunton junior and John Todd to lead Swan Districts to a premiership. They were aiming for their first premiership in twenty years. Former Richmond player, Andrew Krakouer, played for the Swans in what had been a spellbinding season for him, which was capped off by winning the Sandover Medal. Krakouer had been previously imprisoned for a violent assault.

== The game ==
The first term was played at a fast tempo in which both sides’ defences held firm. Swan Districts though were wasteful with their kicking for goal, scoring 1.6 (12) during the quarter to go into the first break down by nine points.

Swans began to outwit and outrun Claremont in the second quarter, largely thanks to Krakouer. They managed to add four goals to their total compared with the Tigers who managed only a further two goals.

The intensity of the match increased after the long break and both sides added four goals and five behinds to their respective scoreline, giving the Swans a slim lead at the final change.

As was the case in the third term both sides scored an equal number of goals in last quarter, the most important and dramatic of these though was Krakouer's late goal merely seconds before the final siren. It put Swans into the one point lead that they would carry until the end of the game to clinch their first flag since 1990.

Andrew Krakouer was the stand out performer of the match, kicking four goals and gaining forty possessions.

Final score: Swan Districts: 14.16 (100); Claremont: 14.15 (99)

== Teams ==
=== Claremont ===
FB:	Blake Anderson	Brandon Franz	Nic Chidgzey
HB:	Ryan Neates	Beau Wilkes	Simon Starling
C:	Byron Schammer	Luke Blackwell	Andrew Foster
HF:	Ian Richardson	Jesse Laurie	Andrew Browne (c)
FF:	Jarrod Ninyette	David Crawford	Kane Mitchell
R:	Andrew Ruck	Rory Walton	Tom Swift
I:	Lewis Stevenson	Tom Derickx	Ryan Brabazon
I:	Ian Rowe		
Coach:	Simon McPhee		

=== Swan Districts ===
FB:	Graham Jetta	Tallan Ames	Matt Riggio
HB:	Wayde Twomey	Matthew Spencer	Clancee Pearce
C:	Tom Roach	Josh Roberts (c)	Pat Hassett
HF:	Justin Simpson	Tim Geappen	Paul Richardson
FF:	Andrew Krakouer	Ashley Hansen	Ben Colreavy
R:	Llane Spaanderman	Brett Robinson	Travis Casserly
I:	Ryan Davis	Stephen Coniglio	Clayton Hinkley
I:	Michael Walters		
Coach:	Brian Dawson		
