= David Crawford (Australian footballer) =

Australian rules footballer

Personal information
- Full name: David Ian Crawford
- Born: 14 July 1983 (age 43); Mosman Park, Western Australia
- Original team: Mosman Park JFC
- Height: 188 cm (6 ft 2 in)
- Weight: 87 kg (192 lb)
- Position: Utility

Playing career^{1}
| Years | Club | Games (Goals) |
| 2002–13 | Claremont | 200 (255) |

Representative team honours
| Years | Team | Games (Goals) |
| 2013 | Western Australia | 1 (0) |
- ^{1} Playing statistics correct to the end of 2013.

Career highlights
- Western Australia Under-18 representative 2001; Claremont life member 2011; Claremont premiership side 2011, 2012; Claremont League Championship Cup 2012

David Ian Crawford (born 14 July 1983) is a former Australian rules footballer who played for the Claremont Football Club in the West Australian Football League (WAFL). Recruited from Aquinas College, Crawford played 200 games for Claremont in various positions between 2002 and 2013, and was a member of Claremont's premiership teams in 2011 and 2012. Crawford also played for Western Australia at state and under-18 level.

== Football career ==
Born in Mosman Park, Crawford began playing football with the Mosman Park JFC. He attended Aquinas College, where he played in the First XVIII for two years. Crawford also featured in a number of Claremont development squads. He represented Western Australia at the 2001 AFL Under 18 Championships, and also played for the Western Australia under-19 volleyball team.

Crawford made his senior debut for Claremont against West Perth at Newdegate in round 13, 2002. He played a further three games in 2002, and nine in 2003, before gaining a more regular spot in 2004, when he played 16 games, including the grand final loss to Subiaco. He again played in a losing grand final in 2005.

In 2006, he played 22 games, kicking 58 goals playing mainly at centre half-forward, which included three six-goal and one eight-goal hauls. Crawford also played in a losing grand final in 2007, before taking a year off from football to travel in 2009. He returned to football for the 2010 season, again playing in a losing grand final.

Crawford moved to Claremont's defence during the later stages of his career, primarily playing at centre half-back. During the 2011 season he played all 22 WAFL games for Claremont, including his 150th WAFL game in round 19 against East Perth, in which he earned life membership with the club. He played at centre half-back in Claremont's 56 point victory over Subiaco in the Grand Final, kicking a goal late in the game to put Claremont 50 points up. During the season, he also played three Foxtel Cup games for Claremont, including the grand final loss to Williamstown.

Crawford again played mostly in defence during the 2012 season. He played 20 WAFL games and two Foxtel Cup games during the season, including Claremont's grand final victories over East Fremantle in the WAFL Grand Final and Werribee in the Foxtel Cup.

During the 2013 season, Crawford won state representative honours with Western Australia, playing in a victory over Victoria. He played his 200th game for Claremont in the preliminary final defeat to East Perth, becoming only the eighth player to reach the landmark for the club. His form throughout the season was recognised when he was named in The West Australian's Team of the Year for the first time.

Crawford announced his retirement in October 2013, having played 200 games for Claremont (193 WAFL games and seven Foxtel Cup games) and one game for Western Australia. He was inducted into the WAFL 200 Club the following year.

Crawford currently plays for Trinity Aquinas AFC in the Western Australian Amateur Football League. He kicked 35 goals in 15 games during the 2014 season, including five against Whitford on his debut.

== Career statistics ==
Statistics are correct as of end of the 2013 WAFL Season

| Season | Team | No. | WAFL | | | | | | Other* | | | | | | Total |
|---|---|---|---|---|---|---|---|---|---|---|---|---|---|---|---|---|---|---|---|---|
| | | | Games | Goals | Behinds | Kicks | Marks | Handballs | Games | Goals | Behinds | Kicks | Marks | Handballs | Games | Goals | Behinds | Kicks | Marks | Handballs |
| 2002 | Claremont | 19 | 4 | 4 | N/A | N/A | N/A | N/A | - | - | - | - | - | - | 4 | 4 | N/A | N/A | N/A | N/A |
| 2003 | Claremont | 19 | 9 | 13 | N/A | N/A | N/A | N/A | - | - | - | - | - | - | 9 | 13 | N/A | N/A | N/A | N/A |
| 2004 | Claremont | 19 | 16 | 25 | N/A | N/A | N/A | N/A | - | - | - | - | - | - | 16 | 25 | N/A | N/A | N/A | N/A |
| 2005 | Claremont | 19 | 21 | 43 | N/A | N/A | N/A | N/A | - | - | - | - | - | - | 21 | 43 | N/A | N/A | N/A | N/A |
| 2006 | Claremont | 19 | 22 | 58 | 37 | 179 | 103 | 69 | - | - | - | - | - | - | 22 | 58 | 37 | 179 | 103 | 69 |
| 2007 | Claremont | 19 | 22 | 27 | 19 | 168 | 79 | 68 | - | - | - | - | - | - | 22 | 27 | 19 | 168 | 79 | 68 |
| 2008 | Claremont | 19 | 19 | 38 | 22 | 172 | 78 | 68 | - | - | - | - | - | - | 19 | 38 | 22 | 172 | 78 | 68 |
| 2010 | Claremont | 19 | 19 | 26 | 14 | 118 | 85 | 121 | - | - | - | - | - | - | 19 | 26 | 14 | 118 | 85 | 121 |
| 2011 | Claremont | 19 | 22 | 14 | 9 | 138 | 85 | 170 | 3 | 0 | 1 | 9 | 6 | 9 | 25 | 14 | 10 | 147 | 91 | 179 |
| 2012 | Claremont | 19 | 20 | 8 | 3 | 128 | 72 | 110 | 2 | 0 | 0 | 8 | 2 | 13 | 22 | 8 | 3 | 136 | 74 | 123 |
| 2013 | Claremont | 19 | 19 | 2 | 0 | 98 | 52 | 86 | 2 | 0 | 0 | 9 | 3 | 5 | 21 | 2 | 0 | 106 | 55 | 91 |
| 2013 | Western Australia | 19 | - | - | - | - | - | - | 1 | 0 | 2 | 12 | 5 | 6 | 1 | 0 | 2 | 12 | 5 | 6 |
| Total | | | 193 | 255 | 104+ | 1001+ | 554+ | 692+ | 8 | 0 | 3 | 38 | 16 | 33 | 201 | 255 | 107+ | 1039+ | 570+ | 725+ |

*Other games include seven Foxtel Cup games (for Claremont) and one state representative game (for Western Australia).
N/A - statistics were not available for this season and have not been included in the above totals

== Personal life ==
Crawford holds a double degree in law and commerce and has worked as a chartered accountant for Gooding Partners since 2002.
