= Clancy Rudeforth =

Australian rules footballer (born 1983)

Personal information
- Full name: Clancy Alexander Rudeforth
- Nickname: "Ruda"
- Born: 1 February 1983 (age 43); Kellerberrin, Western Australia
- Original team: Wembley Downs JFC / Hale School
- Draft: 35th overall, 2002 Rookie Draft (West Coast)
- Height: 181 cm (5 ft 11 in)
- Weight: 76 kg (168 lb)
- Positions: Defender, tagger

Playing career^{1}
Years	Club	Games (Goals)
2001–11	Claremont	170 (51)

Representative team honours
Years	Team	Games (Goals)
2004–06	Western Australia	2 (0)
- ^{1} Playing statistics correct to the end of 2011.

Career highlights
- Australia under-17 captain 2000; Western Australia under-18 representative 2000, 2001; Western Australia under-18 captain 2001; Claremont captain 2009–11; Claremont premiership side 2011

Clancy Alexander Rudeforth (born 1 February 1983) is a former Australian rules footballer who played for the Claremont Football Club in the West Australian Football League (WAFL), captaining the side from 2009 to 2011. He was previously rookie-listed at the West Coast Eagles in the Australian Football League (AFL). Still, he did not play a senior game for them. Rudeforth currently works as a solicitor at a Perth-based commercial law firm.

== Football career ==
Born in Kellerberrin, Rudeforth moved to Kununurra with his family at the age of three months. His father was a country doctor, and Rudeforth also lived in Carnarvon and Corrigin before he moved to Perth to attend Hale School. Rudeforth played for the Western Australia Under-18 team in both the 2000 and 2001 AFL Under 18 Championships, captaining the side in 2001. He also captained the Australia under-17 team that toured Ireland in 2000. Rudeforth made his senior debut for Claremont in round two of the 2001 season, against Peel Thunder. He was recruited to the West Coast Eagles with the 35th pick overall in the 2002 Rookie Draft, and spent three seasons at the club before being de-listed at the end of the 2004. Rudeforth's form for Claremont was consistent however; he played 23 games in 2004 and was selected in the WAFL representative side against the Victorian Football League (VFL). He also finished second in the EB Cook Medal, Claremont's best and fairest award, and played in the club's losing Grand Final team against Subiaco. Rudeforth was again selected in the WAFL representative side in 2006, against the South Australian National Football League (SANFL).

Rudeforth was named captain of Claremont in 2009. In September 2010, Rudeforth had his jaw broken after an incident with Swan Districts defender Luke Pratt, who was suspended for three games for the incident. In 2011, Rudeforth played his 150th game for Claremont, against Port Adelaide in the Foxtel Cup. He played his 150th WAFL game the week after, against West Perth. He captained the club to the 2011 premiership, defeating Subiaco by 56 points in the 2011 Grand Final, announcing his retirement after the game.

== Personal life ==
Rudeforth currently works as a solicitor for Herbert Smith Freehills, an international commercial law firm, and is involved with oil and gas law. During 2005, when he took a year off from playing football to travel overseas, Rudeforth kept fit by running in European mountain ranges, and also participated in the 2005 New York City Marathon, finishing the course in three hours, 15 minutes, and 32 seconds to place 1,425th out of 37,516 runners. In April 2012, Rudeforth biked from Perth to Albany, a distance of 410 km, in support of the Proudies Foundation.
