= Chad Jones =

Australian rules footballer (born 1984)

Personal information
- Full name: Chad Jonathon Jones
- Nickname: Cones
- Born: 15 June 1984 (age 42); Perth, Western Australia
- Original team: Wembley Downs JFC
- Draft: 24th pick, 2003 National Draft (Kangaroos); 45th pick, 2007 Rookie Draft (West Coast)
- Height: 196 cm (6 ft 5 in)
- Weight: 98 kg (216 lb)
- Position: Utility

Playing career^{1}
Years	Club	Games (Goals)
2003–12	Claremont	108 (364)
2004–06	Kangaroos	6 (1)
2007–08	West Coast	7 (8)
Total		121 (373)

Representative team honours
Years	Team	Games (Goals)
2007–10	Western Australia	2 (6)
- ^{1} Playing statistics correct to the end of 2012.

Career highlights
- Claremont leading goalkicker 2009, 2010; Bernie Naylor Medal 2009, 2010; Claremont premiership side 2011, 2012

Chad Jonathon Jones (born 15 June 1984) is an Australian rules footballer currently listed with the Claremont Football Club in the West Australian Football League (WAFL), having previously played for the Kangaroos and the West Coast Eagles in the Australian Football League (AFL). From Perth, Western Australia, Jones made his debut for Claremont in 2003, and was recruited to the Kangaroos in the 2003 National Draft. Over three seasons at the club, he played six games, kicking a single goal, before being traded to West Coast prior to the 2007 season. At West Coast, Jones played seven games over two seasons before being delisted. Remaining with Claremont where he played as a key forward, Jones led the club's goalkicking in 2009 and 2010, also winning the Bernie Naylor Medal as the competition's leading goalkicker in both seasons. He went on to play in Claremont's 2011 and 2012 premiership sides, having also represented Western Australia in two interstate matches.

== Career ==
The younger brother of former West Coast Eagles player Brett Jones, Jones originally played for the Wembley Downs Junior Football Club. Educated at Hale School, he played Alcock Cup matches before being recruited to Claremont in the WAFL. He made his senior debut for Claremont in round 1, 2003, against Peel Thunder, playing eight games and kicking 11 goals. He was recruited to the Kangaroos with pick number 24 in the 2003 National Draft. Jones made his AFL debut in round six of the 2004 season against the Western Bulldogs, recording five disposals before being dropped for the next game. He returned to play two more games late in the season, but mainly played with the club's VFL-affiliate, Port Melbourne. He did not play a game in 2005, spending the entire season in the VFL. After being reassigned to the Tasmanian Devils in the VFL for 2006, Jones managed three consecutive games for the Kangaroos in rounds 11–13, but these were his last games for the club as he was de-listed at the end of the season.

Jones was recruited by the West Coast Eagles with pick 45 in the 2007 Rookie Draft, joining his brother at the club. After kicking 42 goals from 11 games for Claremont at WAFL level, including a run of 26 goals in four games, Jones made his debut for West Coast in round 13 of the 2007 season, against Adelaide, kicking three goals playing at centre half-forward. He kicked four behinds from 13 possession in his next game, against the Brisbane Lions, but was dropped two games after, returning for one game in round 22. His form for Claremont was consistent however, and he finished with 63.41 for the season, second only to Anthony Jones (68 goals) as Claremont's leading goalkicker. He played in the club's Grand Final loss to Subiaco, and also represented the WAFL in interstate football against the Victorian Football League (VFL), kicking two goals. After spending the first three rounds of the season in the WAFL, kicking 15 goals for Claremont, Jones played three more games for West Coast from rounds 5–7, kicking five goals, but severely sprained his ankle at training, missing a month of football. He returned to football at WAFL level in round 14 against Peel Thunder, but was unable to break back into the Eagles' line-up due to the form of Quinten Lynch, Ben McKinley and Ashley Hansen. He was de-listed by West Coast at the end of the season.

Remaining with Claremont, Jones emerged as a full-forward in 2009, kicking 77 goals to be the club's leading goalkicker, also winning the Bernie Naylor Medal as the competition's leading goalkicker. He continued this form in the 2010 season, kicking 85 goals, including two eight-goal hauls and one haul ten-goal 27-possession game against Peel Thunder, to again win the Bernie Naylor Medal. He was also selected to represent the WAFL against the VFL in the 2010 state game, kicking four goals. He missed the first games of the 2011 WAFL season with a hamstring injury, but returned to the side for the latter half of the season, kicking 41 goals in 13 games, which included the 2011 Grand Final win over Subiaco. The following season, Jones kicked 45 goals from 20 games, and again played in Claremont's premiership side.
