= Andrew Browne (footballer, born 1984) =

Australian rules footballer

Personal information
- Full name: Andrew Robert Grahame Browne
- Born: 14 May 1984 (age 42)
- Original team: Swanbourne JFC
- Draft: 52nd overall, 2001 national draft
- Height: 176 cm (5 ft 9 in)
- Weight: 79 kg (174 lb)
- Positions: Midfield, half-back flank

Club information
- Current club: Claremont
- Number: 8

Playing career^{1}
Years	Club	Games (Goals)
2002–2009	Fremantle	29 (6)
- ^{1} Playing statistics correct to the end of 2011.

Career highlights
- Western Australia Under-16 team 2000; Under-16 All-Australian team 2000; Western Australia Under-18 team 2001; Beacon Award 2004; Claremont premiership side 2011

Andrew Robert Grahame Browne (born 14 May 1984) is a former Australian rules footballer who played for the Claremont Football Club in the West Australian Football League (WAFL). He formerly played for the Fremantle Football Club in the Australian Football League (AFL).

== Career ==
Browne was educated at Christ Church Grammar School in Claremont, Western Australia, excelling at both cricket and football. He eventually became captain of both the cricket First XI and the football First XVIII, as well as Senior Sport Prefect. Browne was drafted in the 2001 National Draft as Fremantle's 4th round selection, 52nd overall. He is a midfielder who made his debut in 2002 but only played in a single AFL game for that year. The following year he managed 3 games at the beginning season before returning to Claremont, where he played the remainder of the season. In 2004, after playing the opening two rounds, he was named as an emergency for six consecutive games before returning to the side in Round 11, where he played the remainder of the season for Fremantle. He received the club's 2004 Beacon Award as the best new talent (under 21 years of age and with fewer than 10 games at the start of the season) and was also a member of Claremont's losing Grand Final team.

He did not play in the 2005 AFL season due to injury, managing only five games for Claremont. In late 2006 Browne became very close to being included in the starting lineup before several matches, before suffering a further injury, meaning he did not play a game for the club in over 2 years. In the 2007 season, he finally broke into the Fremantle starting lineup, playing the first 3 games of the season and impressing in the first 2 games. However, in the third match against the West Coast Eagles, he suffered a hamstring injury, and did not play again until the final game of the season. In 2008, he again struggled to break back into the Fremantle side, playing for Claremont for the first half of the season, before the mid-season retirement of Peter Bell opened up a spot for Browne. He managed to play five of the last eight games and was given an extension on his contract for the 2009 season. In 2009, he played the first two games before he suffered a shoulder injury. In early May he was listed as unavailable indefinitely for personal reasons, and was de-listed at the end of the season.

In May 2010, Browne received approximately $40,000 in redress, representing injury payments not awarded to him during the 2009 season when he was diagnosed with depression and ruled unavailable by Fremantle. At WAFL level, Browne continued playing for Claremont. He played in the loss to Swan Districts in the 2010 Grand Final, and was a member of Claremont's 2011 premiership-winning team in 2011. In March 2012, Browne was named as the captain of the Claremont Football Club, succeeding Clancy Rudeforth, who had retired at the end of the previous season. Browne retired at the end of the 2013 WAFL season.
