= Andrew Krakouer =

Australian rules footballer (1983–2025)

Personal information
- Full name: Andrew James Krakouer
- Born: 4 February 1983; Melbourne, Victoria, Australia
- Died: 30 March 2025 (aged 42); Perth, Western Australia, Australia
- Original team: South Fremantle (WAFL)
- Draft: No. 41, 2000 national draft
- Height: 176 cm (5 ft 9 in)
- Weight: 76 kg (168 lb)
- Position: Forward

Playing career
| Years | Club | Games (Goals) |
| 2001–2007 | Richmond | 102 (102) |
| 2011–2013 | Collingwood | 35 (50) |
| Total | | 137 (152) |

Representative team honours
| Years | Team | Games (Goals) |
| 2010 | WAFL | 1 (1) |

Career highlights
- WAFL Premiership Player: 2010; 2010 Sandover Medal; 2010 Simpson Medal (WAFL Grand Final); 2010 Swan Districts Best and Fairest; 2010 WAFL Team of the Year; 2011 AFL Mark of the Year; 2011 AFL Pre-Season Premiership player

Andrew James Krakouer (4 February 1983 – 30 March 2025) was an Australian rules footballer who played for the Richmond Football Club and Collingwood Football Club in the Australian Football League (AFL).

== Early life ==
Krakouer was born in Melbourne in 1983, the son of Jim Krakouer and nephew of Phil Krakouer. He was the cousin of former Gold Coast and Port Adelaide player Nathan Krakouer.

He began playing colts football for South Fremantle in the WAFL.

== AFL career ==
=== Richmond ===
He was drafted with the 41st selection in the 2000 AFL draft by Richmond, who had received the draft pick by trading Ben Harrison to the Western Bulldogs.

Before making his AFL debut, Krakouer played for Richmond's affiliate team the Coburg Tigers in the VFL. He made his debut against Essendon at the MCG in round 7, in 2001, and kicked two goals and was Richmond's only multiple goal scorer in the 46-point loss to the Bombers.

A small crumbing forward with excellent evasive skills, Krakouer finished second in Richmond's goal kicking in 2003, third in 2004 and fourth in 2005 and 2006. Krakouer was also a good tackler and in 2004 he laid 95 tackles which was the most at Richmond and ninth overall in the AFL for that season.

He, along with his brother Tyrone, was charged with assault causing grievous bodily harm on 24 December 2006 after an incident in Fremantle, Western Australia on 22 December 2006.

Krakouer was delisted by the Tigers on 22 October 2007.

=== Prison and WAFL football ===
He returned to Western Australia and played in the WAFL for Swan Districts.

He was found guilty in June 2008 of assault with intent to cause bodily harm, an offence that carries a maximum penalty of 20 years' jail. He was sentenced to four years' jail with a minimum non-parole period of 16 months. The sentence was later reduced from 48 to 32 months' jail time.

Krakouer played for the Wooroloo Prison team, which participated in the Mercantile Football Association. Krakouer was released from prison on parole in August 2009, and signed on to play the 2010 football season for Swan Districts in the WAFL. He performed very well for the Swans, winning the Swan Medal as the fairest and best player at the club and the 2010 Sandover Medal as the fairest and best player in the WAFL. He won the Simpson Medal as the best on ground in the Swans' one-point win against Claremont in the WAFL Grand Final, after amassing 42 disposals and kicking four goals, including the game-winning goal in the 33rd minute of the final quarter. A special analysis of the game showed that Krakouer would have polled 290 Champion Data ranking points (Supercoach points) in the game, more than any player has polled in an AFL game since the statistical technique was implemented in 2004.

=== AFL return ===
On 7 October 2010, Collingwood signed Krakouer. The newly established Gold Coast Suns agreed to pre-list him as one of its ten uncontracted players, and then immediately trade him (along with Jon Ceglar, and a draft pick from each of the fourth, fifth and sixth rounds) to Collingwood in exchange for its first round selection in the 2010 AFL draft (pick number 25 overall). Krakouer was unable to join his new teammates on the club's pre-season training camp in Arizona, as his prior conviction meant he was denied entry to the United States.

Krakouer kicked 35 goals in 23 games in his first season with Collingwood and finished 2nd in the Collingwood goal kicking (behind Travis Cloke - 69 goals), including three goals in the 2011 Grand Final loss to Geelong. He won the 2011 AFL Mark of the Year, receiving the Alex Jesaulenko Medal and a $10,000 cash prize from Hungry Jack's, for his mark in Round 9 against the Adelaide Crows at Etihad Stadium.

Krakouer ruptured his anterior cruciate ligament in a pre-season practice match in February 2012; however, he returned to AFL later in the 2012 season for the final home and away match against Essendon (kicking 1 goal) and the following week he kicked four goals in Collingwood's 38-point loss to the Hawthorn Football Club in the Qualifying Final at the MCG.

In early 2012, Krakouer changed his guernsey number to the number three after John McCarthy was delisted. His father, Jim wore this number for most of his career. However, during his rehabilitation from his knee injury he decided to revert to the number 7 he wore successfully in 2011.

Krakouer was delisted at the end of the 2013 season. In November 2013, Krakouer signed on to play for West Perth for the next 2 years. However, before the beginning of the 2014 season, Krakouer walked away from the contract with West Perth in favour of an employment opportunity in the mining industry; however, the job opportunity did not eventuate and so Krakouer finished his career off at West Perth playing four games.

Krakouer's final League career game and goal tally was 227 games and 271 goals which included:

=== AFL ===
- Richmond: 102 games / 102 goals
- Collingwood: 35 games / 50 goals

=== VFL ===
- Coburg Tigers: 39 games / 57 goals
- Collingwood: 14 games / 5 goals

=== WAFL ===
- Swan Districts: 32 games / 48 goals
- West Perth: 4 games / 8 goals

Krakouer also played in five League Grand Finals in his career and averaged 2.40 goals per game which was an excellent return for a small crumbing forward:

- 2002 AFL Preseason Grand Final for Richmond vs Port Adelaide Football Club (1 goal) at Etihad Stadium.
- 2007 VFL Grand Final for Coburg Tigers vs Geelong (1 goal) at MC Labour Park
- 2010 WAFL Grand Final for Swan Districts vs Claremont Football Club (4 goals) at Subiaco Oval
- 2011 AFL Preseason Grand Final for Collingwood vs Essendon (3 goals) at Etihad Stadium.
- 2011 AFL Grand Final for Collingwood vs Geelong (3 goals) at the MCG.

== Death ==
Krakouer died of a suspected heart attack in Perth, on 30 March 2025, at the age of 42.
