= Matt Riggio =

Australian rules footballer

Personal information
- Full name: Matt Riggio
- Born: 14 March 1988 (age 38)
- Original team: Waroona/Peel Thunder
- Draft: 28th overall, 2005 National Draft
- Height: 188 cm (6 ft 2 in)
- Weight: 88 kg (194 lb)
- Position: Midfielder

Playing career^{1}
Years	Club	Games (Goals)
2006–2009	North Melbourne	10 (0)
- ^{1} Playing statistics correct to the end of 2009.

Career highlights
- WAFL Premiership Player: 2010

Matt Riggio (born 14 March 1988) is an Australian rules footballer who recently played for the North Melbourne (the Kangaroos) in the Australian Football League (AFL). Riggio was a second round draft selection, number 28 overall, in the 2005 AFL draft. He had previously played with West Australian Football League (WAFL) club Peel Thunder and is now currently playing for Swan Districts in the WAFL.

Riggio made his debut for North Melbourne in the opening round of the 2007 AFL season, but after also playing the following week, he wasn't selected again until Round 8 of the 2008 season. He played seven consecutive games in 2008 before again being dropped for round 15, playing out the remainder of the season with the Kangaroos' Victorian Football League (VFL) affiliated team, the Werribee Tigers.

Continues to be a dominant midfielder in the WAFL for Swan Districts and has represented WA in state football. Riggio won the Swan Medal for the fairest and best player at the club in 2015 and 2016.
