= Gerrick Weedon =

Australian rules footballer (born 1991)

Personal information
- Full name: Gerrick Peter Weedon
- Nickname: "The Weed"
- Born: 25 May 1991 (age 35)
- Original team: Clontarf College
- Draft: 22nd pick, 2009 National Draft
- Height: 182 cm (6 ft 0 in)
- Weight: 83 kg (183 lb)
- Positions: Forward pocket, half-forward flanker

Club information
- Current club: Claremont

Playing career^{1}
Years	Club	Games (Goals)
2010–12	Claremont	47 (28)
2011	West Coast	1 (0)
- ^{1} Playing statistics correct to the end of 2012.

Career highlights
- Claremont colts premiership side 2009; WAFL Colts Team of the Year 2009; Claremont premiership side 2011, 2012

Gerrick Peter Weedon (born 25 May 1991) is an Australian rules footballer who previously played with the Claremont Football Club in the West Australian Football League (WAFL) and the West Coast Eagles in the Australian Football League (AFL). Originally from the Kimberley region of Western Australia, Weedon moved to Perth to play for Claremont, before being recruited by West Coast with the 22nd pick overall in the 2009 National Draft, playing his first (and only) game for the club in round seven of the 2011 season. Due to his inability to break into West Coast's senior side, Weedon spent most of his time at the club playing in the WAFL, playing in Claremont's premiership sides in both 2011 and 2012. He was delisted from West Coast at the end of the 2012 season.

== Career ==
Weedon grew up in Broome and Tom Price in northern Western Australia. Of Indigenous Australian descent, his mother, Louanne Salmon, is a member of the Gumala Aboriginal Corporation, while his grandmother, Margaret Parker, is a Martu Idja Banyjima elder and a director of the Martu Idja Banyjima Charitable Trust. Weedon started school at St Mary's College in Broome, where he was in the inaugural intake at the West Kimberley Football Academy in 2006, and later moved to Perth to attend secondary school at Clontarf Aboriginal College, where he was involved in the school's football academy. Due to the fact that he was originally from the Kimberley, Weedon was zoned to the Claremont Football Club in the WAFL. He represented Claremont's team in the colts (under-18) competition in 2008 and 2009, playing in the club's premiership win over Peel Thunder in the latter season. At the end of the 2009 season he was named in the WAFL's Colts Team of the Year, after playing 19 games and kicking 26 goals for the season. During the season, Weedon also represented Western Australia in one match at the 2009 National Under-18 Championships against Victoria Metro at Subiaco Oval, recording eight possessions and kicking one goal.

Weedon was recruited to the West Coast Eagles in the Australian Football League (AFL) with the 22nd pick overall in the 2009 National Draft. He missed most of his first pre-season due to injury, and spent much of the 2010 season in Claremont's reserves team, although he did play four senior games for the club, making his debut in round nine. The following season, Weedon played in West Coast's matches in the NAB Cup, the pre-season tournament. He started the season in Claremont's seniors, kicking 10 goals in his first five matches, but was elevated to West Coast's line-up after Patrick McGinnity was ruled out due to illness. Weedon was named as the substitute for the match, and came on the final quarter, recording three disposals and two tackles in limited game-time. He returned to the WAFL the next week, playing in all of Claremont's remaining games for the season. In the club's premiership victory over Subiaco in the 2011 Grand Final, Weedon had 16 possessions and laid five tackles. He also represented the club in two Foxtel Cup matches. During the 2012 season, Weedon did not play a senior game for West Coast, playing 18 league games for Claremont, as well as one reserves match and four Foxtel Cup matches. He again played in Claremont's premiership-winning side, recording six disposals in the club's win over East Fremantle. Weedon was delisted from West Coast at the end of the 2012 season.

== Playing style ==
Weedon generally plays either as a forward pocket or across the half-forward line. He is of medium size and build, standing 182 cm tall and weighing 83 kg. In assessments before his drafting in 2009, Weedon was described as a "hard-working forward who is extremely strong in the air", as well as "vision and awareness in traffic [and] sound defensive pressure skills". At the 2009 AFL Draft Camp, he ranked in the top 20% in the running vertical jump test. After his drafting, Weedon described himself as wanting to emulate David Wirrpanda, who had played 227 games for West Coast between 1996 and 2009. He was later given the number 44 guernsey, which had been Wirrpanda's number prior to his retirement. Before his AFL debut in 2011, his coach at Claremont at the time, Simon McPhee, described Weedon as "very strong overhead, good in one-on-ones and a handy inside player too", calling him "our top tackler at Claremont".

After kicking three goals from two games against Essendon and Fremantle in the first round of the 2012 NAB Cup, Weedon was suggested as a possible replacement for Mark LeCras in West Coast's forward line, who was ruled out for the entire 2012 season after rupturing his anterior cruciate ligament. John Worsfold, the current coach of West Coast, said of Weedon and Ashton Hams, another small forward, were "both physically more prepared to play at the elite level than they have been before".
