= Foxtel Cup =

Australian rules football club knockout cup competition

- Most recent season or competition: 2014
- Sport: Australian rules football
- First season: 2011
- Folded: 2014
- No. of teams: 16 (2011-12), 10 (2013), 9 (2014)
- Country: Australia
- Last champion: Williamstown
- Most titles: Williamstown (2)
- Qualification: Invitation
- Broadcaster: Fox Sports Australia

The Foxtel Cup was an annual Australian rules football club knockout cup competition involving clubs from state league competitions around Australia. The tournament was organised by the Australian Football League (AFL), and was held annually between 2011 and 2014.

The competition initially featured sixteen teams who qualified based on their finishing positions in their previous state league seasons. In 2011 and 2012, matches were played mostly as curtain-raisers to AFL Saturday night games, or occasionally as a stand-alone game in the same timeslot; in 2013 and 2014, matches were mostly played as stand-alone games on Tuesday nights. Matches were televised on subscription television provider and competition naming rights sponsor Foxtel; and clubs played matches on or adjacent to bye weeks in their respective state league fixtures. Total annual prize money for the competition was about $250,000, with $40,000 going to the winner.

Victorian Football League club Williamstown won the Foxtel Cup twice, in 2011 and 2014. West Australian Football League club Claremont won the 2012 competition, and South Australian National Football League club West Adelaide won the 2013 competition.

== Qualification ==
Announced in 2010 as the Leagues Championship Cup, the competition was soon sponsored by subscription television service Foxtel as the Foxtel Cup, and was known by that name throughout its four-year history.

For the inaugural Foxtel Cup in 2011, the AFL invited the highest three ranked teams from the South Australian National Football League, the Victorian Football League and the West Australian Football League; the top two teams from the Queensland Australian Football League; and the top team from AFL Sydney and the Tasmanian Football League – based on those leagues' 2010 seasons. The Greater Western Sydney Giants (which was playing in the NEAFL in 2011 as preparation for entering the Australian Football League in 2012), and the Northern Territory Football Club received special invitations.

However, despite the SANFL signing on to be part of the Cup competition, its top three clubs – Central District, Norwood and Woodville-West Torrens – all rejected their invitations to compete, citing lack of prize money, sponsorship conflicts, salary cap implications, schedule concerns and removing the focus from their SANFL premiership ambitions. Eventually, the SANFL positions in the competition were taken up by West Adelaide, North Adelaide and Port Adelaide Magpies, none of which had reached the SANFL finals in 2010. In 2013 it was announced that the SANFL's top three teams of the 2012 season, Norwood, West Adelaide and North Adelaide, had committed to play in the Foxtel Cup in 2014. At the time of the announcement midway through the 2013 SANFL season the three teams were again the top three on the SANFL premiership ladder, showing that among South Australian clubs, the Foxtel Cup was gaining recognition.

In 2013 and 2014, the scale of the competition was reduced from sixteen teams to nine or ten. In those seasons, the WAFL, SANFL and VFL each contributed two teams to the competition, who entered the competition at the quarter-final stage; and the remaining teams came from the NEAFL and TFL, who contested pre-qualifying rounds before entering the quarter-finals.

The AFL announced on 1 August 2011 that public interest and television audiences well-supported the inaugural year of the Foxtel Cup and as a result the competition would continue for the next five years. However, following the heavy burden of playing mid-week games on the competing clubs, the decision was made to cease the Foxtel Cup after its fourth season, 2014.

== Results ==
=== 2011 Foxtel Cup ===
==== Grand Final ====
GF (AFL Rd 20) 6 August 2011; 3:05 pm WST	Claremont	38–59 stand alone game	Williamstown	Subiaco Oval, Perth match report
	1.2 (8); 2.2 (14); 5.5 (35); 5.8 (38)	match report	2.1 (13); 4.3 (27); 6.4 (40); 9.5 (59)	Attendance: 1,405
		Goals
	Beau Wilkes 2, Jack Bradshaw, Chad Jones, Gerrick Weedon		Nathan Djerrkura 2, Christian Howard 2, Jordan Roughead 2, Ed Barlow, Andrew Hooper, Jason Tutt
		Bests
	Kane Mitchell, Andrew Foster, Gerrick Weedon, Brett Jones; Lewis Stevenson, Thomas Swift		Ben Jolley, Jordan Roughead, Mitch Wallis, Christian Howard, Nathan Djerrkura 2, Matthew Panos

=== 2012 Foxtel Cup ===
==== Grand Final ====
Grand Final (AFL Rd 19) 2 August 2012; 19:35 WST	Werribee	55 - 99 stand alone game	Claremont	Subiaco Oval, Perth match report
	3.0 (18); 5.4 (34); 5.4 (34); 8.7 (55)	match report	4.3 (27); 7.3 (45); 11.7 (73); 15.9 (99)
		Goals
	Ben Warren 3, Levi Greenwood, Leigh Harding, Ben McKinley, Scott Sherlock, Ben Speight		Thomas Lee 6, Jack Bradshaw 2, Nick Suban 2, Alistair Gillespie, Alroy Gilligan, Jeremy McGovern, Jarryd Morton, Ian Richardson
		Bests
	Levi Greenwood, Ben Speight, Matthew O'Dwyer, Ben Warren, Leigh Harding, Ben Ross		Thomas Lee, Nick Suban, Jeremy McGovern, Alroy Gilligan, Rory Walton, Ian Richardson

=== 2013 Foxtel Cup ===
==== Grand Final ====
Grand Final 6 August 2013; 20:35 EST	East Fremantle	28 - 32 stand alone game	West Adelaide	Football Park, Adelaide match report
	0.3 (3); 0.4 (4); 1.10 (16); 2.16 (28)	match report	1.2 (8); 4.5 (29); 4.7 (31); 4.8 (32)
		Goals
	Hancock, Stephen		Beech 2, Silverlock, Still
		Bests
	Peake, O’Brien, Bayliss, Stephen, Dodd		Schmidt (Coles Medalist), Beech, Mangan, Silverlock, Caire

=== 2014 Foxtel Cup ===
==== Grand Final ====
Grand Final 22 July 2014; 20:35 EST	West Perth	8 - 71 stand alone game	Williamstown	Kardinia Park, Geelong match report
	0.2 (2); 0.2 (2); 0.2 (2); 1.2 (8)	match report	5.4 (34); 5.9 (39); 7.11 (53); 10.11 (71)
		Goals
	C.Chalmers		C.Nastasi 2, S.Clouston 2, J.Johnstone 2, J.Owen, J.Dorgan, K.Lambert, S.Tighe
		Bests
	A.Strijk, R.Kerr, L.Tedesco		B.Davies, K.Lambert, S.Tighe, N.Sing, D.Fahey, J.McKenzie, S.Clouston

== Coles Medal ==
The Coles Medal was awarded to the best player onfield in the Foxtel Cup Grand Final.

Year	Coles Medallist	Club
2011	Ben Jolley	Williamstown Football Club
2012	Thomas Lee	Claremont Football Club
2013	Chris Schmidt	West Adelaide Football Club
2014	Ben Davies	Williamstown Football Club

== List of participants ==
Club	Guernsey	Nickname	Location	State League	Cup championships	Cup appearances
Ainslie		Tricolours	Ainslie, Australian Capital Territory	NEAFL Eastern Conference	0	2011–2012
Aspley		Hornets	Carseldine, Queensland	NEAFL Northern Conference	0	2014
Belconnen		Magpies	Belconnen, Australian Capital Territory	NEAFL Eastern Conference	0	2014
Box Hill		Hawks	Box Hill, Victoria	Victorian Football League	0	2014
Burnie Dockers		Dockers	Burnie, Tasmania	Tasmanian Football League	0	2012–2013
Claremont		Tigers	Claremont, Western Australia	West Australian Football League	1	2011–2013
Clarence		Kangaroos	Clarence, Tasmania	Tasmanian Football League	0	2011
East Fremantle		Sharks	East Fremantle, Western Australia	West Australian Football League	0	2013
East Perth		Royals	Leederville, Western Australia	West Australian Football League	0	2011, 2014
Greater Western Sydney Giants		Giants	Blacktown, New South Wales	Australian Football League; Expansion club	0	2011
Labrador		Tigers	Labrador, Queensland	NEAFL Northern Conference	0	2011
Launceston		Blues	Launceston, Tasmania	Tasmanian Football League	0	2012
Morningside		Panthers	Hawthorne, Queensland	NEAFL Northern Conference	0	2011–2012
Mount Gravatt		Vultures	Mount Gravatt, Queensland	NEAFL Northern Conference	0	2012
North Adelaide		Roosters	North Adelaide, South Australia	South Australian National Football League	0	2011
North Ballarat		Roosters	Ballarat, Victoria	Victorian Football League	0	2011
Northern Bullants		Bullants	Preston, Victoria	Victorian Football League	0	2011
Northern Territory		Thunder	Darwin, Northern Territory	NEAFL Northern Conference; NT representative	0	2011–2013
Norwood		Redlegs	Norwood, South Australia	South Australian National Football League	0	2013–2014
Port Adelaide		Magpies	Alberton, South Australia	South Australian National Football League	0	2011–2012
Port Melbourne		Borough	Port Melbourne, Victoria	Victorian Football League	0	2012–2013
Queanbeyan		Tigers	Queanbeyan, New South Wales	NEAFL Eastern Conference	0	2013
South Adelaide		Panthers	Noarlunga Downs, South Australia	South Australian National Football League	0	2012
Southport		Sharks	Southport, Queensland	NEAFL Northern Conference	0	2013
Subiaco		Lions	Subiaco, Western Australia	West Australian Football League	0	2012
Swan Districts		Swans	Bassendean, Western Australia	West Australian Football League	0	2011
Sydney Hills Eagles		Eagles	Rouse Hill, New South Wales	NEAFL Eastern Conference; Sydney AFL representative	0	2011–2012
Werribee		Tigers	Werribee, Victoria	Victorian Football League	0	2012–2013
West Adelaide		Bloods	Richmond, South Australia	South Australian National Football League	1	2011–2014
West Perth		Falcons	Joondalup, Western Australia	West Australian Football League	0	2012, 2014
Western Storm		Storm	Prospect, Tasmania	Tasmanian State League	0	2014
Williamstown		Seagulls	Williamstown, Victoria	Victorian Football League	2	2011 - 2012, 2014

== See also ==
- NFL Night Series and AFC Night Series, similar interstate Australian rules football club competitions which operated from 1976–1979 and from 1977–1987 respectively.
