= Simon McPhee =

Australian rules football coach (born 1969)

Personal information
- Full name: Simon McPhee
- Born: 21 July 1969 (age 57)
- Original team: Wembley (WAAFL)

Coaching career^{3}
Years	Club	Games (W–L–D)
2009–11	Claremont	59 (42–16–1)
2012–	Sandringham:	0 (0–0–0)
Total		59 (42–16–1)
- ^{3} Coaching statistics correct as of 2011.

Career highlights
- Claremont premiership coach 2011

Simon McPhee (born 21 July 1969) is an Australian rules football coach, currently serving as the Head of Player Academy and Development at the St Kilda Football Club in the Australian Football League (AFL). He previously served as coach of the Claremont Football Club in the West Australian Football League (WAFL), coaching the club to their 2011 premiership win, and had previously served as the head coach of Victorian Football League (VFL) club Sandringham.

== Career ==
Educated at Aquinas College, McPhee played for the Wembley Football Club in the Western Australian Amateur Football League (WAAFL), representing Western Australia at the national amateurs carnival, and also played for the East Perth Football Club in the WAFL reserves. He coached Wembley for three years, and also served as coach of the Subiaco colts and Claremont colts and reserves teams. He was appointed caretaker coach of the Claremont senior team in April 2009 after previous coach Roger Kerr was sacked. After the club won seven out of its last fifteen games, McPhee was signed to a two-year contract as full-time coach. In 2010, Claremont finished as minor premiers, but lost to Swan Districts by one point in the Grand Final. The club again finished as minor premiers in the 2011 season, and defeated Subiaco by 56 points in the 2011 Grand Final.

In October 2011, McPhee was appointed senior coach of the Sandringham Football Club for the 2012 season. He will also serve in a role at the St Kilda Football Club's development academy in the Australian Football League (AFL).
