= Brett Jones (footballer) =

Australian rules footballer

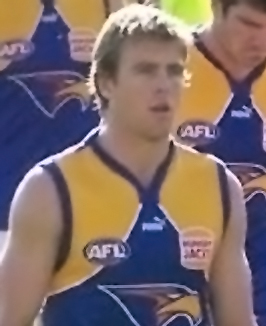

Personal information
- Full name: Brett David Jones
- Born: 6 August 1982 (age 44)
- Original team: University (WAAFL)
- Draft: 9th pick, 2004 Rookie Draft (West Coast)
- Height: 190 cm (6 ft 3 in)
- Weight: 90 kg (198 lb)
- Position: Defender

Playing career^{1}
Years	Club	Games (Goals)
2004–2011	West Coast	102 (6)
- ^{1} Playing statistics correct to the end of 2011.

Career highlights
- West Coast premiership player 2006; Claremont premiership side 2011; West Coast Best Clubman 2011

Brett David Jones (born 6 August 1982) is a former Australian rules footballer who played for the Claremont Football Club in the West Australian Football League (WAFL) and the West Coast Eagles in the Australian Football League (AFL). Originally from Perth, Western Australia, Jones represented Western Australia in under-18 football and under-19 cricket before being drafted by West Coast at the 2004 Rookie Draft. Playing mainly in defensive roles, he played in the club's 2006 premiership victory over Sydney, overall playing 102 games for the club before retiring at the end of the 2011 season.

== Cricket career ==
As a junior, Jones was a cricketer who captained Western Australia at the Under-19 National Championships in 2000. A batsman, Jones was then drafted to the Western Warriors squad, where he represented the 2nd XI. He never made his first-class debut, and focused on Australian rules instead.

== Football career ==
Brett was drafted pick 9 in the 2003 rookie draft after impressing as a medium height defender for Claremont in the WAFL.

In 2004, he was temporarily promoted from the rookie list after a long-term injury to a teammate. He played 8 games that season, including an impressive debut, gathering 19 disposals and 7 marks, in the round 7 loss to Melbourne.

At the end of 2004, leading into the 2005 pre-season, he was permanently elevated of the rookie list, and went on to play 22 games in the 2005 season, missing the round 22 game against Adelaide, as well as the preliminary final against Adelaide and the losing grand final against Sydney.

In 2006, he started off the season slowly playing on 4 of the first 14 games and spending extended stints playing for Claremont in the WAFL. He later ended up regaining his place in the team and from round 15 onwards he played the rest of the home and away season, missing only the round 19 clash against North Melbourne. For the 2006 qualifying final against Sydney he was initially dropped but ended up playing as a late inclusion (due to injuries to some of his teammates) and managed to hold his spot for the following finals games, including the memorable grand final victory over Sydney, which West Coast won by one point.

Continuing from his efforts in the successful 2006 final series, he had a breakout season in 2007, in which he cemented his spot in the team playing all 24 games for the club. He played his 50th AFL game in the round 5 victory over Richmond.

On Monday 26 September 2011, 1 day after playing in a WAFL grand final victory for Claremont, Jones retired from football at the AFL level following a meeting with West Coast head coach John Worsfold.

== Statistics ==
Legend
G	Goals	K	Kicks	D	Disposals	T	Tackles
B	Behinds	H	Handballs	M	Marks

Season	Team	No.	Games	Totals							Averages (per game)						
Season	Team	No.	Games	G	B	K	H	D	M	T	G	B	K	H	D	M	T
2004	West Coast	38	8	0	1	53	32	85	20	15	0.0	0.1	6.6	4.0	10.6	2.5	1.9
2005	West Coast	38	22	3	4	140	119	259	96	32	0.1	0.2	6.4	5.4	11.8	4.4	1.5
2006	West Coast	38	15	0	2	97	104	201	56	21	0.0	0.1	6.5	6.9	13.4	3.7	1.4
2007	West Coast	38	24	1	1	233	222	455	115	43	0.0	0.0	9.7	9.3	19.0	4.8	1.8
2008	West Coast	38	14	0	1	147	100	247	89	24	0.0	0.1	10.5	7.1	17.6	6.4	1.7
2009	West Coast	38	9	2	0	57	51	108	32	13	0.2	0.0	6.3	5.7	12.0	3.6	1.4
2010	West Coast	38	10	0	0	81	76	157	44	17	0.0	0.0	8.1	7.6	15.7	4.4	1.7
Career			102	6	9	808	704	1512	452	165	0.1	0.1	7.9	6.9	14.8	4.4	1.6
