= Allistair Pickett =

Australian rules footballer

Personal information
- Born: 4 August 1973 (age 53)
- Original team: Narrogin Eagles (UGSFL)
- Debut: 22 June 1996, West Perth vs. East Perth, at Perth Oval
- Height: 169 cm (5 ft 7 in)
- Weight: 75 kg (165 lb)

Playing career^{1}
Years	Club	Games (Goals)
1996	West Perth	3 (4)
2001–2002	Peel Thunder	22 (22)
2003–2011	Subiaco	180 (233)
2009	Nightcliff (NTFL)	
Total		205 (259)
- ^{1} Playing statistics correct to the end of 2011.

Career highlights
- 2002 Sandover Medal; 2004 Sandover Medal; 2004, 2006, 2007, 2008 premiership player; Subiaco FC Life Member; Subiaco FC Team of the Century

Allistair Pickett (born 4 August 1973) is an Australian rules footballer who played for Subiaco in the WAFL. Pickett won the 2002 and 2004 Sandover Medals.

== Playing career ==
A small and pacy rover, Pickett started his career in the 1990s with West Perth, playing three WAFL matches, but couldn't make an impact due to injuries. In 2001 he tried again, joining Peel Thunder and the following season became the first ever player from the club to win a Sandover Medal. He won his second Sandover Medal in 2004 while at Subiaco where he also enjoyed team success with four premierships.

In 2008 Pickett was named in Subiaco's official 'Team of the Century' as a forward pocket.

In early 2009 Pickett had a stint at Nightcliff in the Northern Territory Football League.

== Personal ==
Pickett is married with four children. His oldest son, Alliston, also played for Subiaco, and in July 2010 made WAFL history by being the first ever father and son to play in the same league game. Pickett is related to Byron Pickett and Jeff Farmer. Pickett is credited with giving Farmer the nickname "Wizard".
