= 2012 Foxtel Cup =

2012 premiership season
- Teams: 16
- Premiers: Claremont

The 2012 Foxtel Cup was the second season of Australian rules football knock-out cup competition involving clubs from the various state league competitions from around Australia.

The cup's purpose is to support and promote the second-tier Australian rules football competitions and to provide another way of developing lower-tier Australian Football League (AFL) players. It was originally designed to be a one-off, but due to a significant amount of public interest the AFL said the competition would continue through to at least 2016.

The competition began on 31 March 2012 and concluded with the grand final on 2 August 2012. Matches are played as curtain-raisers to Saturday AFL games or as stand-alone matches, with all games to be screened on Fox Sports. Prize-money was increased by about 20 per cent from the 2011 competition, with A$60,000 to be awarded to the winners.

The AFL invited three teams from the South Australian National Football League, the Victorian Football League and the West Australian Football League; two teams from the Tasmanian Football League; and five teams from the two conferences of the North East Australian Football League, including clubs from the Australian Capital Territory, New South Wales, the Northern Territory, and Queensland. Greater Western Sydney, who had acceded to the AFL in 2012, were replaced by a second Tasmanian team.

Claremont became the 2012 Foxtel Cup champions when they defeated Werribee by 44 points in the Grand Final at Patersons Stadium on 2 August 2012. Claremont forward Tom Lee won the Coles Medal as best afield with his six-goal display.

== 2012 season ==
=== Participating clubs ===
NEAFL Eastern Conference (2)

- Ainslie
- Sydney Hills Eagles

NEAFL Northern Conference (3)

- Morningside
- Mount Gravatt
- Northern Territory

SANFL (3)

- South Adelaide
- Port Adelaide Magpies
- West Adelaide
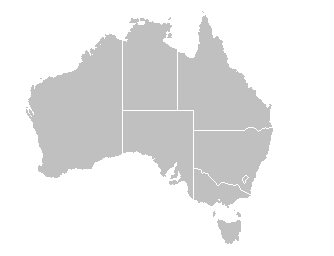

TFL (2)

- Burnie
- Launceston

VFL (3)

- Port Melbourne
- Werribee
- Williamstown

WAFL (3)

- Claremont
- Subiaco
- West Perth

=== Club details ===
Guernsey	Club	Nickname	Location	Qualified as
	Ainslie Football Club	Tri- Colours	Ainslie, Australian Capital Territory	NEAFL Eastern Conference premiers 2011
	Burnie Football Club	Dockers	Burnie, Tasmania	Tasmanian Football League runners-up 2011
	Claremont Football Club	Tigers	Claremont, Western Australia	West Australian Football League premiers 2011
	Launceston Football Club	Blues	Riverside, Tasmania	Tasmanian Football League
	Morningside Australian Football Club	Panthers	Hawthorne, Queensland	NEAFL Northern Conference runners-up 2011
	Mount Gravatt Australian Football Club	Vultures	Mount Gravatt, Queensland	NEAFL Northern Conference 3rd place 2011
	Northern Territory Football Club	Thunder	Darwin, Northern Territory	NEAFL Northern Conference premier 2011; NT representative
	Port Adelaide Football Club (SANFL)	Magpies	Alberton, South Australia	South Australian National Football League 6th place 2011; SA invitee
	Port Melbourne Football Club	Borough	Port Melbourne, Victoria	Victorian Football League premiers 2011
	South Adelaide Football Club	Panthers	Noarlunga Downs, South Australia	South Australian National Football League 4th place, 2011; SA invitee
	Subiaco Football Club	Lions	Subiaco, Western Australia	West Australian Football League runners-up 2011
	Sydney Hills Eagles Australian Football Club	Eagles	Rouse Hill, New South Wales	Sydney AFL premiers 2011
	Werribee Football Club	Tigers	Werribee, Victoria	Victorian Football League 3rd place 2011
	West Adelaide Football Club	Bloods	Richmond, South Australia	South Australian National Football League 7th place 2011; SA invitee
	West Perth Football Club	Falcons	Joondalup, Western Australia	West Australian Football League 3rd place 2011
	Williamstown Football Club	Seagulls	Williamstown, Victoria	Victorian Football League runner-up 2011

== Stadiums ==
Adelaide	Blacktown	Brisbane
AAMI Stadium; Capacity: 51,224	Blacktown ISP Oval; Capacity: 10,000	The Gabba; Capacity: 42,000
Darwin	Gold Coast	Melbourne
TIO Stadium; Capacity: 15,000	Metricon Stadium; Capacity: 25,000	Etihad Stadium; Capacity: 56,347
Melbourne	Perth	Sydney
Melbourne Cricket Ground; Capacity: 100,000	Patersons Stadium; Capacity: 43,500	Sydney Cricket Ground; Capacity: 46,000

== Fixture ==
=== Bracket ===
First round
Morningside	12	10	82
Launceston	7	7	49
Port Adelaide	7	9	51
Subiaco	5	6	36
Werribee	23	9	165
Burnie	5	2	32
Ainslie	7	6	48
West Perth	13	12	90
Claremont	20	10	130
West Adelaide	4	5	29
Sydney Hills	7	12	54
Mount Gravatt	11	14	80
Williamstown	6	7	43
South Adelaide	6	12	48
NT Thunder	7	7	49
Port Melbourne	21	11	137

Quarter-finals
Morningside	12	4	76
Port Adelaide	9	6	60
Werribee	10	7	67
West Perth	6	10	46
Claremont	15	11	101
Mount Gravatt	2	1	13
South Adelaide	8	8	56
Port Melbourne	12	6	78

Semi-finals
Morningside	6	4	40
Werribee	16	15	111
Claremont	13	10	88
Port Melbourne	6	2	38

Final
Werribee	8	7	55
Claremont	15	9	99

=== Round of 16 ===
Game #1 (AFL Rd 1) 31 March 2012; 10:05 EST	Morningside	82–49 curtain raiser to Gold Coast v Adelaide	Launceston	Metricon Stadium, Gold Coast match report
	4.3 (27); 6.4 (40); 10.6 (66); 12.10 (82)	match report	3.2 (20); 5.4 (34); 6.4 (40); 7.7 (49)
		Goals
	Abey 3, Mugavin 3, Brown 2, Amos, Bonney, Delbridge, Mollison		Finch 3, Bristow, Ellis, Lee, O’Keefe
		Bests
	Bonney, Mugavin, Brown, Hackett, Elliott, Abey		Bristow, O’Keefe, Finch, Wooley, Stephens

Game #2 (AFL Rd 2) 7 April 2012; 10:35 CST	Port Adelaide	51–36 curtain raiser to Adelaide v Western Bulldogs	Subiaco	AAMI Stadium, Adelaide match report
	2.3 (15); 3.4 (22); 4.7 (31); 7.9 (51)	match report	1.2 (8); 4.3 (27); 5.5 (35); 5.6 (36)
		Goals
	A.Cockshell, B.Ebert, S.Gray, C.Grove, L.Harder, J.Hoskin, Z.Kirkwood		B.Chambers 3, K.Bloxsidge, B.Broadhurst
		Bests
	Ebert, Kirkwood, Stanley, Biasci, Hoskin, Meiklejohn		Parker, Bristow, Mahoney, Kerr, Chambers, Phelan

Game #3 (AFL Rd 3) 14 April 2012; 11:05 EST	Werribee	165–32 curtain raiser to Western Bulldogs v St Kilda	Burnie	Etihad Stadium, Melbourne match report
	9.4 (58); 11.8 (74); 19.8 (122); 26.9 (165)	match report	0.1 (1); 2.1 (13); 4.2 (26); 5.2 (32)
		Goals
	Warren 5, Daw 3, Greenwood 3, McKinley 3, Speight 3, Lynch 2, Purton-Smith 2, Gibson, Hansen, Moloney, Pedersen, Sullivan		Z.Mihocek 2, Davies, Hardy, Knott
		Bests
	Speight, Greenwood, Warren, Gibson, Hansen, Sierakowski, Daw, Tarrant		McRossen, Z.Mihocek, Hardy

Game #4 (AFL Rd 4) 21 April 2012; 11:05 EST	Ainslie	48–90 stand alone game (note)	West Perth	Blacktown International Sportspark Sydney, Blacktown match report
	1.0 (6); 2.1 (13); 4.3 (27); 7.6 (48)	match report	4.3 (27); 8.6 (54); 11.8 (74); 13.12 (90)
		Goals
	N.Paine 2, J.Whatman 2, L.Carter, S.Horner, M.Lawless		D.Barden 3, M.Johnson 2, A.Strijk 2, J.Van Berlo 2, M.Mascoulis, S.Nelson, A.Saylor, K.Shannon
		Bests
	Paine, Whatman, Crook, Bennett, Walker		Van Berlo, LeCras, Barden, Bartholomew, Nelson, Strijk

Game #5 (AFL Rd 5) 28 April 2012; 12:05 WST	Claremont	130–29 stand alone game	West Adelaide	Patersons Stadium, Perth match report
	3.1 (19); 5.4 (34); 11.6 (72); 20.10 (130)	match report	2.0 (12); 3.2 (20); 4.4 (28); 4.5 (29)
		Goals
	J.Bradshaw 4, J.McGovern 3, A.Hamp 2, R.Neates 2, I.Richardson 2, A.Foster, A.Gillespie, A.Gilligan, T.Handley, T.Lee, P.McGinnity, G.Weedon		N.Homburg, M.Middleton, T.Silverlock, M.Still
		Bests
	Murphy, Richardson, Hamp, Bradshaw, McGovern, Gilligan, Neates		Homburg, Slattery, Bonney

Game #6 (AFL Rd 6) 5 May 2012; 11:05 EST	Sydney Hills Eagles	54–80 curtain raiser to Sydney Swans v Adelaide	Mount Gravatt	Sydney Cricket Ground match report
	1.0 (6); 3.4 (22); 5.9 (39); 7.12 (54)	match report	4.4 (28); 6.8 (44); 9.11 (65); 11.14 (80)
		Goals
	Tungatalum 4, Doyle, Garlick, Houlihan		Gilliand 3, Estall 2, Mowat 2, Furfaro, Jamieson, Smith, Scott
		Bests
	Tungatalum, Houlihan, Costello, Turner		Gilliand, Lake, Bernasconi, Vearing, Grose, Smith, Estall

Game #7 (AFL Rd 7) 12 May 2012; 11:05 EST	Williamstown	43–48 curtain raiser to Richmond v Sydney Swans	South Adelaide	Melbourne Cricket Ground match report
	1.2 (8); 3.2 (20); 4.2 (26); 6.7 (43)	match report	0.3 (3); 3.5 (23); 5.11 (41); 6.12 (48)
		Goals
	M.Panos 2, A.Anastasio, D.Hoghton, K.McHarg, B.Moles		A.Ainger 2, B.Casley, K.Miller, T.Redden, J.Veide
		Bests
	Smith, Jong, Carr, Hoghton, McNamara		Liddle, Dowdell, Otten, Ainger, Miller, Cross, Murphy

Game #8 (AFL Rd 8) 19 May 2012; 10:35 CST	Northern Territory Thunder	49–137 curtain raiser to Western Bulldogs v Gold Coast	Port Melbourne	TIO Stadium, Darwin match report
	3.2 (20); 3.6 (24); 4.7 (31); 7.7 (49)	match report	3.2 (20); 8.4 (52); 16.8 (104); 21.11 (137)
		Goals
	Anderson 2, Campbell, Cunningham, Lawler, McLean, Stokes		O’Sullivan 7, Williams 3, Hinkley 2, Woffindin 2, Breust, Dillon, Gale, Johnston, Langford, Muling, Scipione
		Bests
	Anderson, Dignan, Tyrell, McLean, Dunne		O’Sullivan, Woofindin, Brewer, Pitt, Williams, Hinkley, Dermott

Although stand-alone with regards to AFL games, the Ainslie v West Perth game was played as a curtain-raiser to the NEAFL game between UWS Giants and Queanbeyan.

=== Quarter-finals ===
Qualifying Final #1 (AFL Rd 10) 2 June 2012; 11:05 CST	Port Adelaide	60–76 curtain-raiser to Port Adelaide v Carlton	Morningside	AAMI Stadium, Adelaide match report
	3.0 (18); 4.3 (27); 7.5 (47); 9.6 (60)	match report	4.2 (26); 6.2 (38); 7.3 (45); 12.4 (76)
		Goals
	Rose 3, Wilson 2, Young 2, Ah Chee, McKenzie		Abey 5, Mugavin 3, Elliott 2, McNiece, Upton
		Bests
	Rose, Salopek, Ah Chee, Young, McKenzie		Abey, Upton, Shelton, Bonney, Mugavin, Brown

Qualifying Final #2 (AFL Rd 11) 9 June 2012; 10:35 EST	Werribee	67–46 curtain-raiser to Richmond v Fremantle	West Perth	Melbourne Cricket Ground match report
	1.3 (9); 5.4 (34); 7.7 (49); 10.7 (67)	match report	2.1 (13); 4.3 (27); 4.7 (31); 6.10 (46)
		Goals
	McKinley 2, Tarrant 2, Treloar 2, Gibson, Martiniello, Mather, Speight		Black 2, Bartholomew, Fowler, Salecic, Tindall
		Bests
	Martiniello, Tarrant, Ruggles, Daw, Tuck, Sodomaco, Castello		Black, Jones, Fleay, Bartholomew, LeCras, Keunen

Qualifying Final #3 (AFL Rd 12) 16 June 2012; 12:05 EST	Mount Gravatt	13–101 curtain-raiser to Gold Coast v North Melbourne	Claremont	Metricon Stadium, Gold Coast match report
	0.0 (0); 0.0 (0); 1.0 (6); 2.1 (13)	match report	4.6 (30); 7.7 (49); 10.8 (68); 15.11 (101)
		Goals
	Estall, Gilliland		McGovern 4, Hamp 3, Bradshaw 2, Gillespie 2, Andrews, Foster, Neates, Weedon
		Bests
	Gilliland, Furfaro, Bernasconi, Lake, Murphy		Neates, McGovern, Stevenson, Hamp, Murphy, Silvagni, Walton

Qualifying Final #4 (AFL Rd 13) 23 June 2012; 11:35 EST	Port Melbourne	78–56 curtain-raiser to Collingwood v West Coast	South Adelaide	Melbourne Cricket Ground match report
	1.4 (10); 4.5 (29); 8.6 (54); 12.6 (78)	match report	1.2 (8); 4.5 (29); 6.7 (43); 8.8 (56)
		Goals
	A.Bonaddio 2, B.Burstin 2, S.Dwyer 2, T.Langford 2, J.Scipione 2, S.O'Sullivan, H.Sandilands		P.Rolfe 4, C.O'Shea, T.Pfeiffer, T.Stribling, S.Taylor
		Bests
	Dwyer, Bonaddio, Pinwill, Burstin, Valenti, Sandilands		Rolfe, Stribling, Cross, Murphy, Gotch, Dowdell

=== Semi-finals ===
Semi Final #1 (AFL Rd 15) 7 July 2012; 11:35 EST	Morningside	40–111 stand alone game	Werribee	Gabba, Brisbane match report
	1.1 (7); 4.1 (25); 6.3 (39); 6.4 (40)	match report	3.5 (23); 5.9 (39); 10.12 (72); 16.15 (111)
		Goals
	Spackman 3, Faure, Shelton, Starcevich		McKinley 5, Daw 3, Pedersen 2, Speight 2, Bolton, Greenwood, Lynch, Moloney
		Bests
	Spackman, Spaure, Shelton, Starcevich, McNiece, Bonney		Pedersen, McKinley, Daw, Speight, Warren, Sharp, Keras

Semi Final #2 (AFL Rd 16) 14 July 2012; 15:05 WST	Claremont	88–38 stand alone game	Port Melbourne	Patersons Stadium, Perth match report
	3.2 (20); 7.4 (46); 10.7 (67); 13.10 (88)	match report	2.0 (12); 2.0 (12); 3.4 (22); 6.2 (38)
		Goals
	Gillespie 3, Lee 3, Hamp 2, Blackwell, Morton, Schammer, Suban, Yu		Allan, Breust, Hinkley, Mascitti, Pitt, Thornton
		Bests
	Lee, Andrews, Gillespie, Foster, Morton, Hamp, Schammer		Brewer, Hinkley, Langford, Pitt, Wall

=== Grand Final ===
Grand Final (AFL Rd 19) 2 August 2012; 19:35 WST	Werribee	55–99 stand alone game	Claremont	Patersons Stadium, Perth match report
	3.0 (18); 5.4 (34); 5.4 (34); 8.7 (55)	match report	4.3 (27); 7.3 (45); 11.7 (73); 15.9 (99)
		Goals
	Ben Warren 3, Levi Greenwood, Leigh Harding, Ben McKinley, Scott Sherlock, Ben Speight		Thomas Lee 6, Jack Bradshaw 2, Nick Suban 2, Alistair Gillespie, Alroy Gilligan, Jeremy McGovern, Jarryd Morton, Ian Richardson
		Bests
	Levi Greenwood, Ben Speight, Matthew O'Dwyer, Ben Warren, Leigh Harding, Ben Ross		Thomas Lee, Nick Suban, Jeremy McGovern, Alroy Gilligan, Rory Walton, Ian Richardson
