= Jason Salecic =

Australian rules footballer and coach

Personal information
- Full name: Jason Scott Salecic
- Born: 1 June 1984 (age 42)
- Height: 178 cm (5 ft 10 in)
- Position: Midfielder

Club information
- Current club: West Perth
- Number: 2

Playing career^{1}
Years	Club	Games (Goals)
2002–2021	West Perth	217 (149)

Representative team honours
Years	Team	Games (Goals)
2004—2011	Western Australia	7 (2)
- ^{1} Playing statistics correct to the end of 2021.

Career highlights
- West Perth Best & Fairest: 2009; 2x WAFL premiership player: 2003, 2013

Jason Salecic (born 1 June 1984) is a former Australian rules footballer and coach who played more than 200 games for the West Perth Football Club in the West Australian Football League (WAFL).

Following his playing career, Salecic was appointed West Perth's senior coach for the 2024 WAFL season, succeeding Darren Harris.

His tenure as senior coach ended midway through the 2025 season.
