= Beau Maister =

Australian rules footballer

Personal information
- Full name: Beau Maister
- Born: 20 March 1986 (age 40); Albany, Western Australia
- Original team: Railways (GSFL)
- Draft: 25th overall, 2005 Rookie Draft (West Coast); 64th overall, 2007 Rookie Draft (West Coast); 59th overall, 2008 Rookie Draft (West Coast); Rookie elevation, 2008 (West Coast); 68th overall, 2011 National Draft (St Kilda)
- Height: 194 cm (6 ft 4 in)
- Weight: 96 kg (212 lb)
- Position: Utility

Playing career^{1}
Years	Club	Games (Goals)
2005–2010	West Coast	23 (1)
2012–2014	St Kilda	21 (26)
Total		44 (27)

Representative team honours
Years	Team	Games (Goals)
2011	Western Australia	1 (0)
- ^{1} Playing statistics correct to the end of 2014.

Career highlights
- Claremont premiership side 2011; Simpson Medal 2011 (Grand Final)

Beau Maister (born Beau Wilkes, 20 March 1986) is an Australian rules footballer who played with St Kilda and the West Coast Eagles in the Australian Football League (AFL) and for the Claremont Football Club in the West Australian Football League (WAFL).

== Playing career ==
=== 2005-10: Career with West Coast ===
Maister, then known by his previous surname of Wilkes, was drafted from the rookie list by the Eagles in 2004, 2006 and for the third time following the 2007 season and finally made his AFL debut in the Eagles' upset victory over Adelaide at Subiaco Oval in Round 9 of the 2008 AFL season. He was delisted at the end of 2010.

=== 2011: Career with Claremont (WAFL) ===
In 2011, Maister played in Claremont's WAFL premiership side. He kicked five goals and was awarded the Simpson Medal as the best player on the ground.

=== 2012-14: Career with St Kilda ===
In Round 5, 2012, he played his first game for St Kilda and impressed, kicking three goals before being subbed off.

On 22 June 2014, Maister announced his immediate retirement after 44 games in six seasons at the top level.

== Personal life ==
Maister's mother is a New Zealander. On 6 February 2013, Maister legally changed his name from Beau Wilkes to Beau Maister to keep his mother's maiden name alive.
