= Des Headland =

Australian rules footballer, born 1981

Personal information
- Full name: Desmond John Headland Junior
- Born: 21 January 1981 (age 45); Subiaco, Western Australia
- Original team: Subiaco (WAFL)
- Draft: 1st overall, 1998 National draft Brisbane Lions
- Height: 188 cm (6 ft 2 in)
- Weight: 91 kg (201 lb)
- Positions: Forward, Midfield

Playing career^{1}
Years	Club	Games (Goals)
1998, 2005, 2008–2012	Subiaco	42 (55)
1999–2002	Brisbane Lions	52 (52)
2003–2010	Fremantle	114 (125)
Total		166 (177)
- ^{1} Playing statistics correct to the end of 2012.

Career highlights
- AFL premiership player: 2002; AFLQ premiership player: 2001

Desmond John Headland, Jr (born 21 January 1981) is a retired Australian rules footballer. Following on from his AFL career he continued on finishing his playing career for Subiaco in the West Australian Football League. He was also a former conservative political candidate. He played as a half-forward flanker or midfielder. Headland was selected with the first overall draft pick in the 1998 AFL draft by the Brisbane Lions. He had a 166-game Australian Football League career, playing for Brisbane and Fremantle.

== Playing career ==
=== Pre-AFL Career ===
Headland played junior football for Karrinyup Junior Football Club. His school football was for Lockridge Senior High School where he played alongside future Australian Football League players Garth Taylor, Brett Johnson and Dwayne Simpson. In 1997 Headland represented Western Australia (WA) at the under 16 national championships and won the best and fairest medal and was selected in the All-Australian team. In 1998, he represented WA in the AFL Under-18 Championships, made his league debut for Subiaco Football Club and won both the West Australian Football League (WAFL) rising star and the Subiaco best and fairest award. He also toured Ireland with the AFL/AIS Academy side.

At the end of this outstanding season, Headland was selected by Brisbane Lions with the first selection in the 1998 AFL draft. He was the first Indigenous player to be selected with the first pick in the AFL draft. In 2000, Headland was featured along with Adam Ramanauskas and Brendan Fevola in an Australian Broadcasting Corporation television documentary called The Draft, which followed the three players in the months before they were all drafted to the AFL.

=== Brisbane career ===
Headland only played 3 games for Brisbane in 1999, making his debut in round 13 against Sydney, in which he scored 2 goals. However, he only had 3 kicks in the following game and was dropped for the next five games until being recalled in round 20. He starred in this game against his future team, kicking 3 goals in a huge win over Fremantle. 2000 saw Headland only play 2 games in the first half of the season, but he ended up playing 9 games, including both of Brisbane's final round games. He wore guernsey number 19 in these first two seasons.

In 2001, Headland was given the number 1 guernsey when Richard Champion retired. After playing the first game of the season, Headland was dropped for the next two games, before being recalled and playing the remaining 19 regular season games. Poor form in the last few rounds saw him dropped for the finals series, and he missed the Brisbane Lions first premiership. This enhanced speculation about his return to Perth, but following an outstanding display for Brisbane's reserves team in the winning 2001 AFLQ State League Grand Final, he was retained for the 2002 season by Brisbane.

2002 started slowly for Headland, with his first game not until round 6, but the four goals he scored were an indication of what was to come. He would play all remaining games that year, and in a 15-game purple patch from round 11 to the end of the year he would kick 30 goals, average 21 possessions and poll 16 Brownlow Medal votes, including three best-on-grounds and votes in six consecutive games. This culminated in Brisbane's second premiership and, unlike 2001, Headland claimed a premiership medal.

=== Fremantle career ===
At the end of 2002, Fremantle entered the trade week with only one objective, to obtain Des Headland. A complex trade including Blake Caracella, Adam McPhee and the exchanging of numerous draft picks saw Headland return to WA and join the team whose T-shirt he had worn during interviews at the 1998 draft camp (as shown in the documentary The Draft). The expectations of the Fremantle fans were high, especially when McPhee, who was traded by Fremantle to obtain Headland, won All-Australian selection and the Bomber's best and fairest award, the Crichton Medal in 2004.

In the lead up to the 2003 AFL season Headland was chosen in an ATSIC Chairman's All-Star team that played Carlton at Marrara Oval, Darwin. The All-Star team defeated Carlton by 73 points, with Headland adjudged by The Age as best on ground.

2003 saw Headland poll Brownlow Medal votes in four games, including two best on ground performances. However, he failed to register a top-ten finish in the club best and fairest award. Leg injuries including an ankle injury during the Wizard Cup in 2004 and a calf strain in 2005 have limited his effectiveness, and he has not been able to recapture the form that he showed at Brisbane in 2002 for any sustained period of time.

In Round 4, 2003, Headland was one of 7 indigenous players to represent Fremantle, the most ever to play in a single AFL team. The other indigenous players for Fremantle that day were Troy Cook, Jeff Farmer, Antoni Grover, Roger Hayden, Steven Koops and Dion Woods. This game also saw Fremantle score its highest ever score of 25.17 167 in a comprehensive defeat of the Kangaroos.

In Round 8, 2003 in a match between St Kilda and Fremantle, Headland was one of four players who had been number one AFL draft selections and one of twenty-first round selections.

== Statistics ==
Legend
G	Goals	K	Kicks	D	Disposals	T	Tackles
B	Behinds	H	Handballs	M	Marks

Season	Team	No.	Games	Totals							Averages (per game)						
Season	Team	No.	Games	G	B	K	H	D	M	T	G	B	K	H	D	M	T
1999	Brisbane Lions	19	3	5	1	19	10	29	9	1	1.7	0.3	6.3	3.3	9.7	3.0	0.3
2000	Brisbane Lions	19	9	2	6	48	24	72	22	16	0.2	0.7	5.3	2.7	8.0	2.4	1.8
2001	Brisbane Lions	1	20	11	15	147	51	198	52	38	0.6	0.8	7.4	2.6	9.9	2.6	1.9
2002	Brisbane Lions	1	20	34	24	293	95	388	139	54	1.7	1.2	14.7	4.8	19.4	7.0	2.7
2003	Fremantle	11	22	18	19	259	89	348	94	58	0.8	0.9	11.8	4.0	15.8	4.3	2.6
2004	Fremantle	11	20	17	9	232	105	337	77	73	0.9	0.5	11.6	5.3	16.9	3.9	3.7
2005	Fremantle	11	15	20	17	166	61	227	74	40	1.3	1.1	11.1	4.1	15.1	4.9	2.7
2006	Fremantle	11	20	21	12	259	74	333	104	41	1.1	0.6	13.0	3.7	16.7	5.2	2.1
2007	Fremantle	11	17	25	15	213	88	301	73	34	1.5	0.9	12.5	5.2	17.7	4.3	2.0
2008	Fremantle	11	6	4	4	55	30	85	19	16	0.7	0.7	9.2	5.0	14.2	3.2	2.7
2009	Fremantle	11	9	13	8	99	38	137	57	26	1.4	0.9	11.0	4.2	15.2	6.3	0.9
2010	Fremantle	11	5	7	2	35	12	47	16	8	1.4	0.4	7.0	2.4	9.4	3.2	1.6
Career			166	177	132	1825	677	2502	736	405	1.1	0.8	11.0	4.1	15.1	4.4	2.4

== Return to Subiaco ==
After retiring from Fremantle in 2010. Headland rejoined his former WAFL team Subiaco for the 2011 WAFL season.

== Political career ==
Headland was selected in July 2013 as a candidate for the Palmer United Party for the Federal seat of Durack. This is a conservative party formed by Australian mining businessman Clive Palmer in April 2013.

Headland announced his candidacy only one day after he had told a West Australian paper that "I've had one conversation which has sparked a bit of interest... I haven't had a big think about it or spoken to my family. There's nothing set in stone or anything yet, but who knows. I'm only a 32-year-old and still learning my way and it was just a quick phone call to say G'day."
