= Ian Richardson (Australian footballer) =

Australian rules footballer

Personal information
- Full name: Ian Richardson
- Born: 14 October 1987 (age 39); Perth
- Original team: West Coast Ams
- Height: 177 cm (5 ft 10 in)
- Weight: 73 kg (161 lb)
- Position: Half Forward

Club information
- Current club: Claremont Tigers
- Number: 4

Playing career^{1}
| Years | Club | Games (Goals) |
| 2008 – present | Claremont | 147 (327) |
- ^{1} Playing statistics correct to the end of season, 2015.

Career highlights
- Jack Clarke Medal 2006; Simpson Medal 2008 (state game); Claremont premiership side 2011, 2012

Ian Richardson (born 14 October 1987) is an Australian rules footballer in the West Australian Football League (WAFL). Richardson has played for the Claremont Tigers since his WAFL debut in 2008.

== Career ==
Ian won the Jack Clarke Medal for the best and fairest player in the WAFL Colts competition in 2006 before his dreams of player AFL football were dealt a blow when he missed selection in the draft. 2007 was also frustrating for Richardson as he failed to break into Claremont’s strong league team despite strong form in the reserves.

=== Claremont Tigers ===
==== 2008 ====
Debuting in Round 1 of the WAFL 2008 season against West Perth, Richardson managed to kick a goal in his first game. He went through the entire 2008 season managing to get a goal in every single match. The goalsneak was awarded the Simpson Medal for his best-on-ground display for Western Australia in their 73-point victory over Queensland in Townsville. The match was the first appearance for Ian in WA colours after he was overlooked for state junior representative teams.

==== 2009 ====
Ian missed the first round of the 2009 season, but returned after Claremont's bye to play in the third round.

== Statistics ==
Statistics are correct as of Round 3, 2009 (6 April 2009)

| Season | Team | No. | Games | Goals | Behinds | Kicks | Marks | Handballs | Disp. Av |
|---|---|---|---|---|---|---|---|---|---|
| 2008 | Claremont | 4 | 20 | 62 | 27 | 197 | 103 | 79 | 13.8 |
| 2009 | Claremont | 4 | 1 | 2 | 1 | 5 | 4 | 6 | 11 |
| Totals | | | 21 | 64 | 28 | 202 | 107 | 85 | - |
