= Luke Blackwell =

Australian rules footballer (born 1986)

Personal information
- Full name: Luke Michael Blackwell
- Nickname: Blackers
- Born: 9 November 1986 (age 39); Melbourne, Victoria
- Original team: Mazenod College
- Draft: 41st overall (F/S), 2004 National Draft; Carlton
- Height: 179 cm (5 ft 10 in)
- Weight: 78 kg (172 lb)
- Position: Midfielder

Playing career^{1}
Years	Club	Games (Goals)
2004	Swan Districts (WAFL)	4 (0)
2006–08	Carlton (AFL)	23 (4)
2009–14	Claremont (WAFL)	107 (29)

Representative team honours
Years	Team	Games (Goals)
2011	WAFL	1 (0)
- ^{1} Playing statistics correct to the end of Round 14, 2013.

Career highlights
- Claremont best and fairest 2009, 2010, 2011; Runner-up Sandover Medal 2010; WAFL representative side 2011; Sandover Medal 2011; Claremont premiership side 2011

Luke Michael Blackwell (born 9 November 1986 in Melbourne, Victoria) is an Australian rules footballer. He formerly played for Carlton in the Australian Football League (AFL), and for Claremont in the West Australian Football League (WAFL) where he was the winner of the 2011 Sandover Medal.

== Early life ==
Blackwell was born in Melbourne, and moved to Portland at an early age when his father, Wayne Blackwell, was appointed coach of Portland Football Club in the Western Border Football League (WBFL). His family moved back to Western Australia in 1993, where Blackwell attended Mazenod College, Perth and later coached Perth from 1996 to 1998 and East Fremantle in 2000. His father also played for Claremont and Carlton.

== AFL career ==
Blackwell was recruited from Swan Districts by Carlton in the 2004 AFL draft as the number 41 draft pick, under the father–son rule, being the son of former Carlton midfielder Wayne Blackwell. Luke Blackwell made his AFL debut in Round 8, 2006 against St Kilda.

Blackwell spent most of the 2005 season playing for the Northern Bullants, Carlton's VFL-affiliate, playing mainly as a midfielder, before his season was ended by a broken jaw. He began to break his way into the Carlton side in 2006, with his best game being the Round 13 clash against Brisbane, where he gathered 26 possessions and received two votes in the Brownlow Medal. He played ten of the last eleven games of the season.

In his last two seasons with Carlton, Blackwell was in and out of the senior team and was de-listed at the end of the 2008 season.

== WAFL career ==
Blackwell returned to Western Australia in 2009, joining the Claremont Football Club. He found more consistent form, winning the EB Cook Medal as Claremont's best and fairest in both 2009 and 2010. He was also awarded the Simpson Medal as best on ground for WAFL representative side against the Victorian Football League (VFL) in 2010, gathering 37 disposals.

Blackwell won the 2011 Sandover Medal for the fairest and best player in the WAFL, polling 42 votes; he had been runner-up in for the award in 2010, losing to Swan Districts' Andrew Krakouer. Blackwell was part of Claremont's 2011 premiership team, his first senior premiership. He again won the EB Cook Medal for Claremont's best and fairest, for a third consecutive time. He was named in Claremont's "Greatest Ever Team", which was announced in late 2013.

He left Claremont at the end of 2014, returning to Victoria where he joined Essendon District Football League club Aberfeldie. He played with Aberfeldie from 2015 until 2019, where he won the Reynolds Medal as premier division best and fairest in 2016, two Reg Rose Medals as best on ground in the grand final (2017 and 2018), and a total of three premierships, before retiring at the end of 2019.
