= Byron Schammer =

Australian rules footballer, born 1985

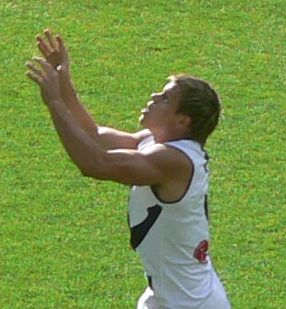

Personal information
- Full name: Byron Alexander Schammer
- Born: 21 June 1985 (age 41)
- Original teams: West Adelaide Football Club, SANFL
- Draft: 13th overall, 2002
- Height: 176 cm (5 ft 9 in)
- Weight: 79 kg (174 lb)
- Position: Midfielder

Playing career^{1}
Years	Club	Games (Goals)
2003–2011	Fremantle	129 (38)
- ^{1} Playing statistics correct to the end of 2011.

Career highlights
- Larke Medal 2002; AFL Rising Star nominee 2003; Claremont premiership side 2011

Byron Alexander Schammer (born 21 June 1985) is an Australian rules footballer formally playing with the Claremont Football Club in the West Australian Football League (WAFL) and with the Fremantle Football Club in the Australian Football League.

== Early life ==
Schammer rose to prominence in 2002 by winning the prestigious Larke Medal for the best player at the AFL Under 18 Championships. He also captained Australia in an under 17s International Rules Test against Ireland.

== AFL career ==
He was taken by Fremantle later that year with the club's first selection (no. 13 overall) in the National Draft. Playing 17 games in his debut season, including the club's historic first final against Essendon, he quickly announced himself to be a player of the future, and earned a nomination for the Rising Star award. He backed it up with a strong 2004 season that saw him poll 12 Brownlow Medal votes, despite suffering a shoulder injury mid-year. Having moved into a defensive role in 2006, he played in 24 of Fremantle's 25 games in 2006, before he was missed the first half of the 2007 season due to suffering a burst appendix and a subsequent bowel blockage during his recovery period.

He only missed one game in 2008 and in 2009, during the most consistent season of his career, he signed a two-year contract extension. However Schammer struggled to maintain his place in the Fremantle side in 2010 and 2011, playing only three games in 2010 and two in 2011, despite playing well for Claremont in the West Australian Football League (WAFL). In August 2011, the week after playing his first AFL game for the season, Schammer announced his retirement from the AFL. He will continue to play in the WAFL and will focus on his work as a stockbroker.
