= Andrew Foster (footballer) =

Australian rules footballer (born 1985)

Personal information
- Full name: Andrew John Foster
- Born: 31 August 1985 (age 41)
- Original team: East Fremantle (WAFL)
- Draft: 28th overall, 2007 Rookie Draft
- Height: 183 cm (6 ft 0 in)
- Weight: 78 kg (172 lb)
- Position: Midfielder

Playing career^{1}
Years	Club	Games (Goals)
2007–2009	Fremantle	9 (6)
- ^{1} Playing statistics correct to the end of 2009.

Andrew John Foster (born 31 August 1985) is an Australian rules footballer, who was rookie listed by the Fremantle Football Club in the Australian Football League (AFL). He was taken with Fremantle's second round pick in the 2007 Rookie Draft (pick 28).

He is from the East Fremantle Football Club in the West Australian Football League (WAFL). In 2006 he played every game for the club, following shoulder reconstructions which kept him out of the side in most of both the 2004 and 2005 seasons. Playing as a midfielder he finished runner up to Shane Woewodin in East Fremantle's best and fairest award, the Lynn Medal in 2006.

During the 2007 season, Foster was elevated to the Fremantle senior list as a replacement for Justin Longmuir, who was placed on the long-term injury list. After being named as an emergency for the round 18 Western Derby, he finally made his AFL debut the following week against Essendon at Subiaco Oval. After playing three of the last four games in 2007, Foster has a horror 2008 season, only playing one game for Fremantle and four games for East Fremantle before a back injury ruled him out the remainder of the season in Round 13.

On 21 April 2009, it was revealed that Foster and teammate Clayton Hinkley had conducted pranks on teammates whilst dressed up in what was described by Fremantle's development coach Steve Malaxos as Ku Klux Klan costumes. Fremantle were forced to release a photo of the pranksters which showed the players showing no resemblance to the Klan. The players were not sanctioned by the AFL or the Dockers.

He was delisted by Fremantle at the end of the 2009 season and despite suggestions that he may have been re-drafted in the Pre-season or rookie drafts, was overlooked in both drafts. He then switched to Claremont in the WAFL for the 2010 season.
