= 2011 West Coast Eagles season =

West Coast Eagles
2011 season
- President: Alan Cransberg
- Coach: John Worsfold
- Captain: Darren Glass
- Home ground: Patersons Stadium
- Pre-season competition: Semi-finals
- AFL season: 4th
- Finals series: 4th
- Best & Fairest: Darren Glass
- Leading goalkicker: Josh Kennedy (59)
- Highest home attendance: 42,803 vs. Carlton (semi-final)
- Lowest home attendance: 35,059 vs. Port Adelaide (round 13)
- Average home attendance: 37,436

The West Coast Eagles are an Australian rules football team based in Perth, Western Australia. Their 2011 season was their 25th season in the Australian Football League (AFL), their tenth season under premiership coach John Worsfold, and the fourth season with Darren Glass as captain. In the previous season, West Coast finished last on the ladder to receive their first wooden spoon. West Coast began their 2011 season with a four-point win over North Melbourne on 27 March. At the conclusion of round ten, West Coast had won five of their nine games and lost four, but over the remainder of the season they won 12 of their 13 games to finish fourth at the end of the regular season. In the finals series, the club lost their qualifying final to Collingwood by 20 points. They defeated Carlton in a home semi-final, but lost to Geelong, the eventual premiers in a preliminary final at the MCG the following week.

At the conclusion of the season, Glass was awarded the Club Champion Award as the club's best and fairest, with Matt Priddis finishing runner-up. Josh Kennedy was the leading goal-kicker, kicking 59 goals throughout the season.

== Background ==
The Eagles' leadership group for 2011 was composed of the captain Darren Glass, vice-captain Beau Waters, as well as Andrew Embley, Shannon Hurn, Josh Kennedy, Mark LeCras, Matt Priddis, Adam Selwood, Scott Selwood and Beau Waters.

== Playing list ==
Ashley Hansen, Matthew Spangher, Will Sullivan, Adam Cockie and Tony Notte were delisted. Tim Houlihan was delisted but was later re-listed by the Eagles in the 2011 Rookie draft.

West Coast traded Ben McKinley to North Melbourne in exchange for pick 86 in the 2010 National draft.

=== Draft selections ===
- National draft selections

4 - Andrew Gaff (Oakleigh Chargers)
26 - Jack Darling (West Perth) (priority)
29 - Scott Lycett (Port Adelaide)
62 - Jacob Brennan (East Fremantle) (F/S)

- Pre-season draft selections

5 - Blayne Wilson (Peel Thunder)

- Rookie draft selections

10 - Tim Houlihan (West Coast Eagles) (re-drafted)
27 - Anton Hamp (Claremont)
44 - Jeremy McGovern (Claremont)

West Coast also upgraded rookies Lewis Stevenson, Callum Wilson and Andrew Strijk to the senior list using selections 78, 84 and 93 respectively.

=== Statistics ===
Playing list and statistics
| Player | No. | Games | Goals | Behinds | Kicks | Handballs | Disposals | Marks | Tackles | Notes/Milestone(s) |
|---|---|---|---|---|---|---|---|---|---|---|
| Mitch Brown | 1 | 6 | 0 | 0 | 39 | 23 | 62 | 14 | 10 | |
| Mark LeCras | 2 | 22 | 47 | 29 | 237 | 121 | 358 | 92 | 86 | |
| Andrew Gaff | 3 | 17 | 7 | 7 | 172 | 130 | 302 | 75 | 19 | AFL debut (round 1) |
| Daniel Kerr | 4 | 16 | 7 | 8 | 174 | 220 | 394 | 35 | 38 | |
| Brad Ebert | 5 | 22 | 14 | 7 | 176 | 123 | 299 | 82 | 73 | |
| Mark Nicoski | 6 | 25 | 41 | 25 | 214 | 105 | 319 | 72 | 70 | |
| Chris Masten | 7 | 13 | 7 | 4 | 91 | 99 | 190 | 32 | 42 | |
| Beau Waters | 8 | 11 | 0 | 0 | 129 | 69 | 198 | 53 | 34 | |
| Nic Naitanui | 9 | 23 | 18 | 10 | 120 | 179 | 299 | 50 | 88 | |
| Scott Selwood | 10 | 25 | 9 | 10 | 220 | 248 | 468 | 69 | 202 | |
| Matt Priddis | 11 | 25 | 9 | 5 | 276 | 386 | 662 | 76 | 193 | |
| Brad Sheppard | 12 | 6 | 1 | 0 | 48 | 26 | 74 | 17 | 22 | |
| Luke Shuey | 13 | 25 | 24 | 22 | 323 | 179 | 502 | 65 | 104 | |
| Koby Stevens | 14 | 2 | 0 | 0 | 5 | 2 | 7 | 4 | 2 | |
| Tom Swift | 15 | 5 | 1 | 2 | 46 | 37 | 83 | 23 | 5 | |
| Eric Mackenzie | 16 | 15 | 0 | 0 | 79 | 83 | 162 | 55 | 30 | |
| Josh Kennedy | 17 | 23 | 59 | 38 | 208 | 62 | 270 | 144 | 70 | |
| Bradd Dalziell | 18 | 1 | 0 | 0 | 3 | 2 | 5 | 3 | 0 | |
| Tim Houlihan | 19 | 0 | —N/a | —N/a | —N/a | —N/a | —N/a | —N/a | —N/a | Rookie |
| Dean Cox | 20 | 25 | 20 | 17 | 270 | 176 | 446 | 137 | 43 | |
| Quinten Lynch | 21 | 24 | 28 | 20 | 262 | 125 | 387 | 157 | 33 | |
| Ryan Neates | 22 | 0 | —N/a | —N/a | —N/a | —N/a | —N/a | —N/a | —N/a | |
| Darren Glass | 23 | 24 | 0 | 0 | 122 | 144 | 266 | 97 | 48 | 200th AFL game |
| Matt Rosa | 24 | 18 | 5 | 4 | 233 | 168 | 401 | 94 | 56 | |
| Shannon Hurn | 25 | 25 | 5 | 3 | 343 | 109 | 452 | 114 | 44 | |
| Sam Butler | 26 | 13 | 0 | 0 | 160 | 68 | 228 | 80 | 51 | |
| Jack Darling | 27 | 23 | 24 | 11 | 165 | 119 | 284 | 103 | 93 | AFL debut (round 1) |
| Ashley Smith | 28 | 18 | 4 | 4 | 164 | 97 | 261 | 81 | 33 | |
| Scott Lycett | 29 | 1 | 2 | 0 | 4 | 7 | 11 | 2 | 1 | AFL debut (round 19) |
| Blayne Wilson | 30 | 0 | —N/a | —N/a | —N/a | —N/a | —N/a | —N/a | —N/a | |
| Will Schofield | 31 | 23 | 2 | 4 | 154 | 109 | 263 | 91 | 47 | |
| Andrew Embley | 32 | 24 | 17 | 19 | 312 | 206 | 518 | 113 | 104 | |
| Jordan Jones | 33 | 0 | —N/a | —N/a | —N/a | —N/a | —N/a | —N/a | —N/a | |
| Jacob Brennan | 34 | 0 | —N/a | —N/a | —N/a | —N/a | —N/a | —N/a | —N/a | |
| Patrick McGinnity | 35 | 19 | 1 | 4 | 109 | 110 | 219 | 41 | 67 | |
| Callum Wilson | 36 | 0 | —N/a | —N/a | —N/a | —N/a | —N/a | —N/a | —N/a | |
| Adam Selwood | 37 | 25 | 3 | 4 | 245 | 185 | 430 | 102 | 57 | 150th AFL game |
| Brett Jones | 38 | 0 | —N/a | —N/a | —N/a | —N/a | —N/a | —N/a | —N/a | |
| Lewis Broome | 39 | 0 | —N/a | —N/a | —N/a | —N/a | —N/a | —N/a | —N/a | Rookie |
| Anton Hamp | 40 | 0 | —N/a | —N/a | —N/a | —N/a | —N/a | —N/a | —N/a | Rookie |
| Andrew Strijk | 41 | 1 | 0 | 0 | 2 | 1 | 3 | 1 | 1 | |
| Jeremy McGovern | 42 | 0 | —N/a | —N/a | —N/a | —N/a | —N/a | —N/a | —N/a | Rookie |
| Ashton Hams | 43 | 4 | 1 | 3 | 25 | 24 | 49 | 13 | 7 | |
| Gerrick Weedon | 44 | 1 | 0 | 0 | 2 | 1 | 3 | 0 | 2 | AFL debut (round 7) |
| Jarrad Oakley-Nicholls | 45 | 0 | —N/a | —N/a | —N/a | —N/a | —N/a | —N/a | —N/a | Rookie |
| Lewis Stevenson | 47 | 0 | —N/a | —N/a | —N/a | —N/a | —N/a | —N/a | —N/a | |

== Season summary ==
The first round of the 2011 NAB Cup was played using a round-robin format where the Eagles, Fremantle and Hawthorn each played each other once in a series of games held at Patersons Stadium on 13 February. The Eagles won both of their games, progressing through to the NAB Cup quarter-finals where they defeated Gold Coast by 37 points to progress to a semi-final against Collingwood; however they lost their semi-final by 24 points and were eliminated from the NAB Cup.

After finishing with the wooden spoon in 2010, most commentators predicted the Eagles to finish in the bottom four. The team won their first two matches, against North Melbourne and Port Adelaide by four points and 18 points respectively, and lost the next two, at home to Sydney by 13 points and away to Hawthorn by seven points. The team won the Western Derby by 33 points in round 8, their first since 2007. The Eagles won their round 9 match against the Western Bulldogs by 123 points, the Eagles' highest score and greatest winning margin against the Bulldogs, and the third-biggest winning margin in the club's history, with Josh Kennedy kicking 10 goals, the season-high for the competition. West Coast lost to Collingwood in round 10 by 52 points before going on a five-match winning streak, their best since 2007. The team's round 16 win over Geelong was their first over the Cats since 2006.

=== Results ===
Regular season results
| Round | Date | Result | Score | | | Opponent | Score | | | Ground | | Attendance | Ladder |
| Round | Date | Result | G | B | T | Opponent | G | B | T | Ground | | Attendance | Ladder |
|---|---|---|---|---|---|---|---|---|---|---|---|---|---|
| 1 | Sunday 27 March | Won | 13 | 14 | 92 | North Melbourne | 13 | 10 | 88 | Patersons Stadium | H | 35,878 | 5th |
| 2 | Saturday 2 April | Won | 16 | 20 | 116 | Port Adelaide | 15 | 8 | 98 | AAMI Stadium | A | 23,214 | 3rd |
| 3 | Saturday 9 April | Lost | 13 | 10 | 88 | Sydney | 15 | 11 | 101 | Patersons Stadium | H | 37,288 | 9th |
| 4 | Saturday 16 April | Lost | 9 | 11 | 65 | Hawthorn | 10 | 12 | 72 | Aurora Stadium | A | 15,063 | 10th |
| 5 | Bye | | | | | | | | | | | | 10th |
| 6 | Thursday 28 April | Won | 15 | 16 | 106 | Melbourne | 6 | 16 | 52 | Patersons Stadium | H | 36,298 | 7th |
| 7 | Sunday 8 May | Lost | 12 | 18 | 90 | Essendon | 16 | 10 | 106 | Etihad Stadium | A | 33,631 | 10th |
| 8 | Sunday 15 May | Won | 14 | 12 | 96 | Fremantle | 9 | 9 | 63 | Patersons Stadium | H | 40,567 | 7th |
| 9 | Sunday 22 May | Won | 26 | 19 | 175 | Western Bulldogs | 8 | 4 | 52 | Patersons Stadium | H | 37,308 | 6th |
| 10 | Sunday 29 May | Lost | 7 | 11 | 53 | Collingwood | 16 | 9 | 105 | Melbourne Cricket Ground | A | 52,560 | 7th |
| 11 | Saturday 4 June | Won | 13 | 7 | 85 | Gold Coast | 10 | 7 | 67 | Patersons Stadium | H | 36,815 | 6th |
| 12 | Saturday 11 June | Won | 15 | 16 | 106 | Adelaide | 10 | 7 | 67 | AAMI Stadium | A | 31,412 | 6th |
| 13 | Sunday 19 June | Won | 15 | 20 | 110 | Port Adelaide | 13 | 10 | 88 | Patersons Stadium | H | 35,059 | 5th |
| 14 | Sunday 26 June | Won | 15 | 13 | 103 | Carlton | 10 | 7 | 67 | Etihad Stadium | A | 38,241 | 5th |
| 15 | Bye | | | | | | | | | | | | 6th |
| 16 | Friday 8 July | Won | 14 | 12 | 96 | Geelong | 13 | 10 | 88 | Patersons Stadium | H | 40,164 | 5th |
| 17 | Saturday 16 July | Lost | 9 | 7 | 61 | St Kilda | 13 | 4 | 82 | Etihad Stadium | A | 31,416 | 5th |
| 18 | Sunday 24 July | Won | 8 | 17 | 65 | Fremantle | 9 | 10 | 64 | Patersons Stadium | A | 41,055 | 5th |
| 19 | Saturday 30 July | Won | 15 | 13 | 103 | Western Bulldogs | 15 | 5 | 95 | Etihad Stadium | A | 20,883 | 5th |
| 20 | Sunday 7 August | Won | 22 | 15 | 147 | Richmond | 14 | 6 | 90 | Patersons Stadium | H | 38,106 | 5th |
| 21 | Sunday 14 August | Won | 16 | 14 | 110 | Melbourne | 9 | 8 | 62 | Etihad Stadium | A | 15,740 | 5th |
| 22 | Saturday 20 August | Won | 20 | 14 | 134 | Essendon | 11 | 11 | 77 | Patersons Stadium | H | 38,253 | 4th |
| 23 | Saturday 27 August | Won | 13 | 11 | 89 | Brisbane Lions | 11 | 15 | 81 | The Gabba | A | 13,500 | 4th |
| 24 | Saturday 3 September | Won | 22 | 13 | 145 | Adelaide | 7 | 8 | 50 | Patersons Stadium | H | 36,062 | 4th |
| QF | Saturday 10 September | Lost | 9 | 8 | 62 | Collingwood | 12 | 10 | 82 | Melbourne Cricket Ground | F | 67,502 | —N/a |
| SF | Saturday 17 September | Won | 15 | 11 | 101 | Carlton | 15 | 8 | 98 | Patersons Stadium | F | 42,803 | —N/a |
| PF | Saturday 24 September | Lost | 10 | 9 | 69 | Geelong | 17 | 15 | 117 | Melbourne Cricket Ground | F | 59,455 | —N/a |

Key
| H | Home game |
| A | Away game |
| QF | Qualifying final |
| SF | Semi-final |
| PF | Preliminary final |

=== Ladder ===
2011 AFL ladder
| Pos | Team | Pld | W | L | D | PF | PA | PP | Pts | |
|---|---|---|---|---|---|---|---|---|---|---|
| 1 | Collingwood | 22 | 20 | 2 | 0 | 2592 | 1546 | 167.7 | 80 | Finals series |
| 2 | Geelong (P) | 22 | 19 | 3 | 0 | 2548 | 1619 | 157.4 | 76 | Finals series |
| 3 | Hawthorn | 22 | 18 | 4 | 0 | 2355 | 1634 | 144.1 | 72 | Finals series |
| 4 | West Coast | 22 | 17 | 5 | 0 | 2235 | 1715 | 130.3 | 68 | Finals series |
| 5 | Carlton | 22 | 14 | 7 | 1 | 2225 | 1700 | 130.9 | 58 | Finals series |
| 6 | St Kilda | 22 | 12 | 9 | 1 | 1891 | 1677 | 112.8 | 50 | Finals series |
| 7 | Sydney | 22 | 12 | 9 | 1 | 1897 | 1735 | 109.3 | 50 | Finals series |
| 8 | Essendon | 22 | 11 | 10 | 1 | 2217 | 2217 | 100.0 | 46 | Finals series |
| 9 | North Melbourne | 22 | 10 | 12 | 0 | 2106 | 2082 | 101.2 | 40 | |
| 10 | Western Bulldogs | 22 | 9 | 13 | 0 | 2060 | 2155 | 95.6 | 36 | |
| 11 | Fremantle | 22 | 9 | 13 | 0 | 1791 | 2155 | 83.1 | 36 | |
| 12 | Richmond | 22 | 8 | 13 | 1 | 2069 | 2396 | 86.4 | 34 | |
| 13 | Melbourne | 22 | 8 | 13 | 1 | 1974 | 2315 | 85.3 | 34 | |
| 14 | Adelaide | 22 | 7 | 15 | 0 | 1742 | 2193 | 79.4 | 28 | |
| 15 | Brisbane Lions | 22 | 4 | 18 | 0 | 1814 | 2240 | 81.0 | 16 | |
| 16 | Port Adelaide | 22 | 3 | 19 | 0 | 1718 | 2663 | 64.5 | 12 | |
| 17 | Gold Coast | 22 | 3 | 19 | 0 | 1534 | 2726 | 56.3 | 12 | |

Source: AFL ladder
Rules for classification: 1) points; 2) percentage; 3) number of points for.
(P) Premiers

=== Tribunal cases ===
Seven West Coast Eagles were cited by the Match Review Panel for eight separate offences during the 2011 season: Quinten Lynch was the only player suspended, receiving a one-match suspension after the round 14 game against Carlton for forceful front-on contact with Marc Murphy:

| Player | Round | Charge category | Subject of offence (club) | Result | Verdict | Points^{[b]} |
|---|---|---|---|---|---|---|
| Callum Wilson | PS | Striking | Nathan Krakouer (Gold Coast) | Guilty (early plea) | Reprimand | 93.75 |
| Luke Shuey | PS | Rough conduct | Tom Hunter (Collingwood) | Guilty (early plea) | Reprimand | 93.75 |
| Scott Selwood | 11 | Striking | Gary Ablett (Gold Coast) | Guilty (early plea) | Reprimand | 93.75 |
| Jack Darling | 12 | Negligent contact with an umpire | Brett Rosebury (umpire) | Guilty (early plea) | Fine ($900) | 0 |
| Quinten Lynch | 14 | Forceful front-on contact | Marc Murphy (Carlton) | Guilty | Suspension (one match) | 126.56 |
| Quinten Lynch | 14 | Striking | Marc Murphy (Carlton) | Guilty (early plea) | Reprimand | 45.00 |
| Will Schofield | 14 | Tripping | Marc Murphy (Carlton) | Guilty (early plea) | Reprimand | 93.75 |
| Nic Naitanui | 16 | Forceful front-on contact | Taylor Hunt (Geelong) | Guilty (early plea) | Reprimand | 93.75 |

== Awards ==
=== League awards ===
- John Worsfold was named Coach of the Year at the 2011 AFL Coaches' Association Awards.
- Dean Cox and Darren Glass were selected as ruckman and full-back respectively in the 2011 All-Australian team. Andrew Embley, Josh Kennedy and Matt Priddis were also named in the initial squad of 40 players, but were not selected in the final team.
- Nic Naitanui was nominated as a finalist for the 2011 AFL Mark of the Year.
- Luke Shuey (round two), Jack Darling (round six) and Andrew Gaff (round 19) were nominated for the 2011 AFL Rising Star award, with Shuey finishing second, Darling fifth and Gaff seventh overall.
- Matt Priddis polled the most club votes in the 2011 Brownlow Medal, receiving 19 votes to finish equal ninth.

=== Club awards ===
The 2011 West Coast Eagles Club Champion Awards were held on Friday, 7 October 2011, at Crown Perth. Darren Glass was named Club Champion and Best Finals Player, Brett Jones received the Best Clubman award and Luke Shuey was awarded Rookie of the Year. Josh Kennedy was leading goal-kicker, kicking 59 goals for the year. Mark LeCras (47 goals) and Mark Nicoski (41 goals) was next. Adam Selwood, Richard Godfrey and Glenn Stewart were inducted as life members of the club. The voting for the Club Champion Award went as follows:

2011 Club Champion
| Position | Name | Votes |
|---|---|---|
| 1 | Darren Glass | 398^{[a]} |
| 2 | Matt Priddis | 398^{[a]} |
| 3 | Dean Cox | 397 |
| 4 | Shannon Hurn | 374 |
| 5 | Luke Shuey | 359 |
| 6 | Adam Selwood | 342 |
| 7 | Nic Naitanui | 338 |
| 8 | Andrew Embley | 333^{[b]} |
| 9 | Mark Nicoski | 333^{[b]} |
| 10 | Scott Selwood | 332 |

^{a} Glass and Priddis finished equal first on votes, but Glass was awarded Club Champion on countback, having played less games.
^{b} Embley and Nicoski both polled the same number of votes, but Embley finished higher, having played less games.

== Notes ==
^{b} "Points" refers to carry-over points accrued following the sanction. For example, 154.69 points draw a one-match suspension, with 54.69 carry-over points (for every 100 points, a one-match suspension is given).
