= List of West Coast Eagles players =

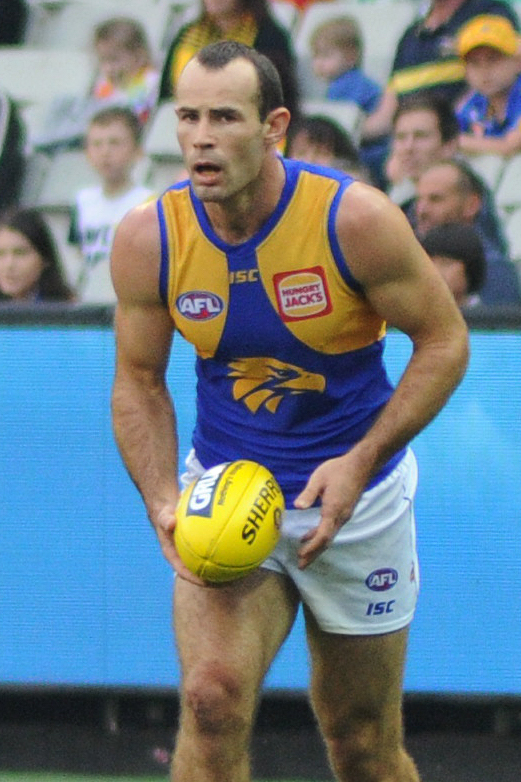
Shannon Hurn holds the record for most games played for the West Coast Eagles with 333 games before retiring after the 2023 AFL season.

As of Round 8 2025, a total of 300 players have played at least one senior game for the West Coast Eagles, an Australian rules football team in the Australian Football League. A number of other players were listed (or are listed) with the club for periods of time without making their debut, some of whom played at senior level for other AFL teams.

== West Coast Eagles players ==
Key
Order	Players are listed in order of debut
Seasons	Includes West Coast only careers and spans from the season of the player's debut to the year in which they played their final game for the West Coast Eagles
Debut	Debuts are for VFL/AFL regular season and finals series matches only
Games	Statistics are for VFL/AFL regular season and finals series matches only and are correct to the end of the 2024 season
Goals	Statistics are for VFL/AFL regular season and finals series matches only and are correct to the end of the 2024 season
^	Currently listed players

=== 1980s ===
№	Name	Debut	Seasons	Games	Goals	Ref
1	John Annear	round 1, 1987	1987–1990	58	40	
2	Adrian Barich	round 1, 1987	1987–1992	47	27	
3	Darren Bennett	round 1, 1987	1987	4	7	
4	Michael Brennan	round 1, 1987	1987–1995	179	20	
5	Peter Davidson	round 1, 1987	1987	2	0	
6	Ross Glendinning	round 1, 1987	1987–1988	40	111	
7	Don Holmes	round 1, 1987	1987–1989	23	40	
8	Alex Ishchenko	round 1, 1987	1987–1988	30	10	
9	Laurie Keene	round 1, 1987	1987–1990	36	38	
10	Dean Laidley	round 1, 1987	1987–1992	52	11	
11	Dwayne Lamb	round 1, 1987	1987–1994	151	44	
12	Chris Lewis	round 1, 1987	1987–2000	215	259	
13	Andrew Macnish	round 1, 1987	1987–1989	20	29	
14	Steve Malaxos	round 1, 1987	1987–1990	66	30	
15	Wally Matera	round 1, 1987	1987–1988	24	26	
16	Geoff Miles	round 1, 1987	1987–1990	71	33	
17	Phil Narkle	round 1, 1987	1987–1990	18	18	
18	Paul Peos	round 1, 1987	1987–1995	55	34	
19	Murray Wrensted	round 1, 1987	1987–1988	29	12	
20	Mark Zanotti	round 1, 1987	1987–1988	36	6	
21	Glen Bartlett	round 2, 1987	1987	4	0	
22	John Gastev	round 2, 1987	1987–1988	30	31	
23	Chris Mainwaring	round 3, 1987	1987–1999	201	84	
24	Michael O'Connell	round 3, 1987	1987–1988	20	13	
25	Phil Scott	round 3, 1987	1987–1990	66	41	
26	Robert Wiley	round 3, 1987	1987	18	24	
27	Dean Turner	round 4, 1987	1987–1990	56	28	
28	John Worsfold	round 4, 1987	1987–1998	209	37	
29	David Hart	round 5, 1987	1987–1998	184	95	
30	Andrew Lockyer	round 5, 1987	1987–1992	78	35	
31	Glenn O'Loughlin	round 8, 1987	1987	1	0	
32	Sean King	round 22, 1987	1987	1	2	
33	Paul Mifka	round 22, 1987	1987	1	0	
34	Karl Langdon	round 1, 1988	1988–1995	100	107	
35	Guy McKenna	round 1, 1988	1988–2000	267	28	
36	Murray Rance	round 1, 1988	1988–1990	57	7	
37	Troy Ugle	round 2, 1988	1988–1993	43	43	
38	Brent Hutton	round 4, 1988	1988–1989	13	9	
39	Chris Waterman	round 5, 1988	1988–1998	177	75	
40	Joe Cormack	round 7, 1988	1988–1989	10	7	
41	David O'Connell	round 5, 1990	1988	27	6	
42	Kevin Caton	round 18, 1988	1988	1	1	
43	Todd Breman	round 1, 1989	1989–1990	23	15	
44	Shane Ellis	round 1, 1989	1989	27	6	
45	Don Pyke	round 1, 1989	1989–1996	132	70	
46	Peter Sumich	round 1, 1989	1989–1997	150	514	
47	Craig Turley	round 1, 1989	1989–1995	115	91	
48	Peter Melesso	round 3, 1989	1989–1990	6	4	
49	Clinton Browning	round 4, 1989	1989	4	5	
50	Richard Geary	round 4, 1989	1989	2	0	
51	Stevan Jackson	round 5, 1989	1989–1991	38	68	
52	Scott Watters	round 6, 1989	1989–1992	46	13	
53	Peter Higgins	round 11, 1989	1989	4	0	
54	Shane Cable	round 12, 1989	1989	1	0	

=== 1990s ===
№	Name	Debut	Seasons	Games	Goals	Ref
55	Brad Gwilliam	round 1, 1990	1990	4	0	
56	Dean Irving	round 1, 1990	1990–1993	43	9	
57	Dean Kemp	round 1, 1990	1990–2001	243	117	
58	Peter Matera	round 1, 1990	1990–2002	253	217	
59	Peter Wilson	round 22, 1995	1990	117	84	
60	Brett Heady	round 4, 1990	1990–1999	156	237	
61	Tony Begovich	round 8, 1990	1990	9	2	
62	Craig McGrath	round 11, 1990	1990–1991	15	13	
63	Tony Evans	round 1, 1991	1991–1998	108	78	
64	Mark Hepburn	round 1, 1991	1991–1992	13	0	
65	David Hynes	round 1, 1991	1991–1995	73	55	
66	Ryan Turnbull	round 7, 1991	1991–2001	129	39	
67	Mitchell White	round 8, 1991	1991–2000	151	103	
68	Cory Young	round 8, 1991	1991	1	0	
69	Ashley McIntosh	round 11, 1991	1991–2003	242	108	
70	Ian Dargie	round 12, 1991	1991	1	0	
71	Glen Jakovich	round 12, 1991	1991–2004	276	60	
72	Dale Kickett	round 12, 1991	1991	2	0	
73	Robbie West	round 24, 1991	1991–1993	13	4	
74	Jason Ball	round 2, 1992	1992–1999	103	114	
75	Trent Nichols	round 2, 1992	1992	4	3	
76	Paul Harding	round 3, 1992	1992–1994	43	5	
77	Daniel Metropolis	round 3, 1992	1992–2000	108	46	
78	Brendan Krummel	round 6, 1992	1992–1994	9	3	
79	Matt Clape	round 14, 1992	1992–1994	9	3	
80	Matthew Connell	round 1, 1993	1993	3	0	
81	Damian Hampson	round 11, 1993	1993–1994	6	1	
82	Jarrad Schofield	round 11, 1993	1993–1998	63	34	
83	Brendon Retzlaff	round 13, 1993	1993	3	0	
84	Drew Banfield	round 16, 1993	1993–2006	265	76	
85	Derek Hall	round 18, 1993	1993	2	3	
86	Tony Godden	round 20, 1993	1993–1995	13	8	
87	Shane Bond	round 1, 1994	1994–1996	34	20	
88	Brett Spinks	round 1, 1994	1994–1997	21	14	
89	Paul Symmons	round 14, 1994	1994–2000	99	36	
90	Fraser Gehrig	round 1, 1995	1994–2000	115	159	
91	Michael Dunstan	round 3, 1995	1995	5	1	
92	Brayden Lyle	round 6, 1995	1995–1996	26	5	
93	Jason Heatley	round 10, 1995	1995–1996	3	5	
94	Ashley Blurton	round 13, 1995	1995–1997	10	2	
95	Ian Downsborough	round 13, 1995	1995–1996	20	5	
96	Andrew Donnelly	round 1, 1996	1996–2000	68	69	
97	Brendon Fewster	round 1, 1996	1996–1999	33	27	
98	Andy Lovell	round 1, 1996	1996–1998	43	20	
99	Chad Morrison	round 1, 1996	1996–2004	148	87	
100	Ben Cousins	round 4, 1996	1996–2007	238	205	
101	Phillip Matera	round 4, 1996	1996–2005	179	389	
102	David Wirrpanda	round 5, 1996	1996–2009	227	131	
103	Shane Sikora	round 18, 1996	1996–1997	3	0	
104	Ilija Grgic	round 1, 1997	1997–1998	23	15	
105	Josh Wooden	round 1, 1997	1997–2006	96	18	
106	Michael Gardiner	round 4, 1997	1997–2006	129	87	
107	Nick Stone	round 4, 1997	1997–2000	33	4	
108	Trent Cummings	round 9, 1997	1997	2	1	
109	Michael Braun	round 11, 1997	1997–2008	228	66	
110	Neil Marshall	round 16, 1997	1997–1998	23	15	
111	Phil Read	round 1, 1998	1998–2002	74	24	
112	Jaxon Crabb	round 5, 1998	1998–2000	15	2	
113	Todd Holmes	round 5, 1998	1998–2000	7	0	
114	Andrew Williams	round 15, 1998	1998–2002	84	42	
115	Rowan Jones	round 19, 1998	1998–2007	158	70	
116	Scott Cummings	round 1, 1999	1999–2001	46	158	
117	Andrew Embley	round 1, 1999	1999–2013	250	216	
118	Chad Rintoul	round 1, 1999	1999–2000	39	10	
119	Laurie Bellotti	round 3, 1999	1999–2000	24	2	
120	Chad Fletcher	round 15, 1999	1999–2009	179	74	

=== 2000s ===
№	Name	Debut	Seasons	Games	Goals	Ref
121	Darren Glass	round 4, 2000	2000–2014	270	8	
122	Scott Bennett	round 7, 2000	2000	1	0	
123	Callum Chambers	round 10, 2000	2000–2004	54	38	
124	David Antonowicz	round 13, 2000	2000	3	0	
125	David Haynes	round 13, 2000	2000–2003	46	43	
126	Michael O'Brien	round 16, 2000	2000	2	0	
127	Kasey Green	round 17, 2000	2000–2005	54	8	
128	Kane Munro	round 21, 2000	2000–2003	18	11	
129	Adam Hunter	round 22, 2000	2000–2009	151	86	
130	Trent Carroll	round 1, 2001	2001–2004	45	6	
131	Michael Collica	round 1, 2001	2001–2003	50	2	
132	Daniel Kerr	round 1, 2001	2001–2013	220	122	
133	Mark Merenda	round 1, 2001	2001–2002	26	26	
134	Michael Prior	round 1, 2001	2001–2002	9	1	
135	David Sierakowski	round 1, 2001	2001–2003	10	3	
136	Richard Taylor	round 1, 2001	2001–2002	28	11	
137	Troy Wilson	round 1, 2001	2001–2003	37	83	
138	Dean Cox	round 2, 2001	2001–2014	290	169	
139	Greg Harding	round 5, 2001	2001	9	0	
140	Travis Gaspar	round 8, 2001	2001–2005	28	15	
141	Jeremy Humm	round 11, 2001	2001–2004	22	1	
142	Brent Tuckey	round 1, 2002	2002	3	1	
143	Chris Judd	round 2, 2002	2002–2007	134	138	
144	Quinten Lynch	round 12, 2002	2002–2012	209	281	
145	Ashley Sampi	round 14, 2002	2002–2006	78	97	
146	Andrew McDougall	round 22, 2002	2002–2006	38	48	
147	Daniel Chick	round 3, 2003	2003–2007	103	51	
148	Paul Johnson	round 5, 2003	2003	1	0	
149	Damien Adkins	round 6, 2003	2003–2005	32	24	
150	Brent Staker	round 17, 2003	2003–2009	110	84	
151	Adam Selwood	round 19, 2003	2003–2013	187	43	
152	Beau Waters	round 3, 2004	2004–2013	120	25	
153	Mark Seaby	round 4, 2004	2004–2009	102	64	
154	Mark Nicoski	round 5, 2004	2004–2013	112	61	
155	Brett Jones	round 7, 2004	2004–2010	102	6	
156	Sam Butler	round 10, 2004	2004–2017	166	16	
157	Ashley Hansen	round 11, 2004	2004–2010	78	95	
158	Zach Beeck	round 17, 2004	2004	1	0	
159	Tyson Stenglein	round 1, 2005	2005–2009	102	25	
160	Jaymie Graham	round 3, 2005	2005–2008	37	13	
161	Daniel McConnell	round 8, 2005	2005	2	0	
162	Mark LeCras	round 10, 2005	2005–2018	196	409	
163	Aaron Edwards	round 11, 2005	2005	4	2	
164	Matt Rosa	round 17, 2005	2005–2015	168	39	
165	Mitch Morton	round 19, 2005	2005–2007	12	11	
166	Shannon Hurn	round 5, 2006	2006–2023	333	50	
167	Matt Priddis	round 10, 2006	2006–2017	240	73	
168	Steven Armstrong	round 13, 2006	2006–2008	36	27	
169	Mitch Brown	round 1, 2007	2007–2016	94	14	
170	Chad Jones	round 13, 2007	2007–2008	7	8	
171	Eric Mackenzie	round 15, 2007	2007–2018	147	7	
172	Ben McKinley	round 15, 2007	2007–2010	46	89	
173	Will Schofield	round 19, 2007	2007–2020	194	22	
174	Jamie McNamara	round 21, 2007	2007–2009	19	4	
175	Brad Ebert	round 2, 2008	2008–2011	76	33	
176	Chris Masten	round 2, 2008	2008–2019	215	70	
177	Scott Selwood	round 3, 2008	2008–2015	135	37	
178	Matt Spangher	round 4, 2008	2008–2010	26	3	
179	Josh Kennedy	round 6, 2008	2008–2022	271	712	
180	Ryan Davis	round 8, 2008	2008–2009	14	4	
181	Tim Houlihan	round 9, 2008	2008–2009	15	1	
182	Beau Wilkes	round 9, 2008	2008–2010	23	1	
183	Tony Notte	round 20, 2008	2008	2	0	
184	Adam Cockie	round 6, 2009	2009	7	3	
185	Tom Swift	round 10, 2009	2009–2012	34	8	
186	Nic Naitanui	round 12, 2009	2009–2023	213	112	
187	Patrick McGinnity	round 15, 2009	2009–2016	93	29	
188	Callum Wilson	round 18, 2009	2009–2010	7	13	

=== 2010s ===
№	Name	Debut	Seasons	Games	Goals	Ref
189	Luke Shuey	round 1, 2010	2010–2023	248	142	
190	Bradd Dalziell	round 3, 2010	2010–2013	28	19	
191	Ashton Hams	round 4, 2010	2010–2013	39	41	
192	Lewis Stevenson	round 5, 2010	2010	10	2	
193	Brad Sheppard	round 7, 2010	2010–2021	216	19	
194	Koby Stevens	round 13, 2010	2010–2012	11	2	
195	Andrew Strijk	round 13, 2010	2010–2012	13	11	
196	Ashley Smith	round 15, 2010	2010–2014	45	10	
197	Jordan Jones	round 21, 2010	2010	2	0	
198	Jack Darling	round 1, 2011	2011–2024	298	532	
199	Andrew Gaff	round 1, 2011	2011–2024	280	84	
200	Gerrick Weedon	round 7, 2011	2011	1	0	
201	Scott Lycett	round 19, 2011	2011–2018	75	45	
202	Josh Hill	round 1, 2012	2012–2017	107	151	
203	Jacob Brennan	round 6, 2012	2012–2014	28	2	
204	Ryan Neates	round 7, 2012	2012	1	0	
205	Murray Newman	round 14, 2012	2012–2015	6	4	
206	Jamie Cripps	round 1, 2013	2013–2026	271	334	
207	Callum Sinclair	round 2, 2013	2013–2015	29	18	
208	Sharrod Wellingham	round 6, 2013	2013–2017	79	18	
209	Mark Hutchings	round 7, 2013	2013–2021	75	36	
210	Blayne Wilson	round 11, 2013	2013–2014	9	0	
211	Simon Tunbridge	round 14, 2013	2013–2017	10	5	
212	Adam Carter	round 16, 2013	2013–2014	7	0	
213	Cale Morton	round 16, 2013	2013	3	1	
214	Jamie Bennell	round 1, 2014	2013–2016	30	3	
215	Xavier Ellis	round 1, 2014	2014–2016	34	9	
216	Dom Sheed	round 1, 2014	2014–2025	165	69	
217	Elliot Yeo^	round 1, 2014	2014–	185	84	
218	Brant Colledge	round 3, 2014	2014–2015	3	0	
219	Jeremy McGovern	round 6, 2014	2014–2025	197	38	
220	Tom Lamb	round 1, 2015	2015	1	1	
221	Jackson Nelson	round 22, 2016	2015–2022	102	2	
222	Liam Duggan^	round 2, 2015	2015–	200	15	
223	Fraser McInnes	round 4, 2015	2015–2018	11	6	
224	Tom Barrass	round 17, 2015	2015–2024	150	1	
225	Jack Redden	round 1, 2016	2016–2022	134	28	
226	Lewis Jetta	round 2, 2016	2016–2020	75	17	
227	Tom Cole^	round 10, 2016	2016–	130	5	
228	Jonathan Giles	round 13, 2016	2016–2017	9	3	
229	Malcolm Karpany	round 19, 2016	2016–2018	7	6	
230	Sam Mitchell	round 1, 2017	2017	22	4	
231	Drew Petrie	round 1, 2017	2017	16	16	
232	Nathan Vardy	round 1, 2017	2017–2021	52	22	
233	Kurt Mutimer	round 6, 2017	2017–2019	4	1	
234	Luke Partington	round 19, 2017	2017–2018	6	3	
235	Liam Ryan	round 1, 2018	2018–2025	124	158	
236	Jake Waterman^	round 1, 2018	2018–	112	149	
237	Daniel Venables	round 1, 2018	2018–2019	21	11	
238	Willie Rioli	round 2, 2018	2018–2022	51	60	
239	Jack Petrucelle	round 6, 2018	2018–2025	90	71	
240	Brendon Ah Chee	round 8, 2018	2018–2021	31	14	
241	Brayden Ainsworth	round 8, 2018	2018–2021	15	4	
242	Jarrod Brander	round 13, 2018	2018–2021	22	5	
243	Oscar Allen	round 16, 2018	2018–2025	105	151	
244	Tom Hickey	round 1, 2019	2019–2020	23	9	
245	Josh Smith	round 2, 2019	2019–2020	2	1	
246	Josh Rotham	round 3, 2019	2019–2024	72	2	
247	Jarrod Cameron	round 14, 2019	2019–2020	12	13	
248	Francis Watson	round 18, 2019	2019	2	0	

=== 2020s ===
№	Name	Debut	Seasons	Games	Goals	Ref
249	Tim Kelly^	round 1, 2020	2020–	163	84	
250	Jamaine Jones	round 4, 2020	2020–2024	59	19	
251	Harry Edwards^	round 9, 2020	2020–	55	0	
252	Nic Reid	round 12, 2020	2020	3	1	
253	Xavier O'Neill	round 13, 2020	2020–2023	39	8	
254	Bailey Williams^	round 14, 2020	2020–	88	30	
255	Hamish Brayshaw	round 17, 2020	2020	1	0	
256	Luke Foley	round 18, 2020	2020–2023	32	2	
257	Zac Langdon	round 1, 2021	2021–2023	25	9	
258	Isiah Winder	round 4, 2021	2021–2023	7	4	
259	Alex Witherden	round 5, 2021	2021–2024	62	3	
260	Luke Edwards	round 12, 2021	2021–2024	37	3	
261	Connor West	round 18, 2021	2021–2023	28	7	
262	Sam Petrevski-Seton	round 1, 2022	2022–2023	27	0	
263	Brady Hough^	round 1, 2022	2022–	74	3	
264	Hugh Dixon	round 1, 2022	2022	10	4	
265	Patrick Naish	round 1, 2022	2022	11	1	
266	Aaron Black	round 2, 2022	2022	1	1	
267	Angus Dewar	round 2, 2022	2022	1	0	
268	Stefan Giro	round 2, 2022	2022	1	0	
269	Callum Jamieson	round 2, 2022	2020–2025	17	0	
270	Declan Mountford	round 2, 2022	2022	2	1	
271	Jack Williams	round 2, 2022	2022–	42	37	
272	Luke Strnadica	round 6, 2022	2022	2	1	
273	Greg Clark	round 7, 2022	2022–2023	21	3	
274	Jake Florenca	round 8, 2022	2022	1	0	
275	Rhett Bazzo^	round 14, 2022	2022–	27	0	
276	Zane Trew	round 16, 2022	2022–2024	13	4	
277	Jai Culley	round 18, 2022	2022–2024	12	7	
278	Campbell Chesser	round 1, 2023	2023–	35	7	
279	Reuben Ginbey^	round 1, 2023	2023–	62	2	
280	Jayden Hunt	round 1, 2023	2023–2025	58	15	
281	Noah Long^	round 1, 2023	2023–	35	12	
282	Elijah Hewett^	round 2, 2023	2023–	33	14	
283	Ryan Maric^	round 13, 2023	2023–	51	17	
284	Harry Barnett	round 16, 2023	2023–	2	0	
285	Tyler Brockman^	round 1, 2024	2024–	29	15	
286	Harley Reid^	round 1, 2024	2024–	39	24	
287	Loch Rawlinson	round 5, 2024	2024	1	0	
288	Harvey Johnston^	round 8, 2024	2024–	6	0	
289	Tyrell Dewar^	round 9, 2024	2024–	22	10	
290	Matt Flynn^	round 11, 2024	2024–	21	6	
291	Jack Hutchinson^	round 13, 2024	2024–	23	3	
292	Clay Hall	round 21, 2024	2024–	15	2	
293	Archer Reid^	round 1, 2025	2025–	14	5	
294	Matthew Owies	round 1, 2025	2025–	16	7	
295	Jack Graham^	round 1, 2025	2025–	17	2	
296	Liam Baker^	round 1, 2025	2025–	22	5	
297	Sandy Brock^	round 4, 2025	2025–	13	0	
298	Hamish Davis^	round 4, 2025	2025–	7	1	
299	Tom Gross^	round 4, 2025	2025–	8	1	
300	Bo Allan^	round 8, 2025	2025–	6	0	
301	Tom McCarthy^	round 14, 2025	2025–	9	0	
302	Jobe Shanahan^	round 16, 2025	2025–	9	12	
303	Malakai Champion^	round 17, 2025	2025–	2	0	
304	Jacob Newton^	round 23, 2025	2025–	2	1	
305	Lucca Grego^	round 24, 2025	2025–	1	0	
306	Cooper Duff-Tytler^	round 1, 2026	2026–			
307	Willem Duursma^	round 1, 2026	2026–			
308	Josh Lindsay^	round 1, 2026	2026–			
309	Milan Murdock^	round 1, 2026	2026–			
310	Deven Robertson^	round 1, 2026	2026–			
311	Tylar Young^	round 1, 2026	2026–			
312	Harry Schoenberg	round 3, 2026	2026–			
313	Brandon Starcevich^	round 13, 2026	2026–			
314	Marcus Herbert^	round 14, 2026	2026–			
315	Oliver Francou^	round 17, 2026	2026–			

== Other players ==
=== Listed players yet to play a senior game for West Coast ===
Player	Date of birth	Acquired	Recruited From	Listed	
Player	Date of birth	Acquired	Recruited From	Rookie	Senior
Sam Allen	13 January 2007	No. 29, 2025 national draft	Oakleigh Chargers	—N/a	2026–
Tylah Williams	22 February 2007	No. 39, 2025 national draft	Swan Districts	—N/a	2026–
Fred Rodriguez	10 July 2007	No. 1, 2026 rookie draft	South Fremantle	2026–	—N/a

=== Delisted players who did not play a senior game for West Coast ===
Player	Date of birth	Acquired	Recruited from	Listed	
Player	Date of birth	Acquired	Recruited from	Rookie	Senior
Corey Adamson	23 February 1992	No. 28, 2015 rookie draft	San Diego Padres	2015–2016	—N/a
Ryan Ambrose	22 November 1998	2022 Covid top-up player	West Coast	2022	—N/a
Ashley Arrowsmith	12 April 1989	No. 28, 2008 rookie draft	Calder Cannons	2007–2009	—N/a
Jordyn Baker	10 May 2004	Category B rookie, 2022	East Perth	2023–2024	—N/a
Darren Bartsch	28 April 1969	No. 52, 1988 national draft	West Adelaide	—N/a	1989^{[a]}
Tarir Bayok	8 March 1998	2016 pre-rookie draft selection	East Perth	2017–2018	—N/a
Liam Bedford	12 July 1988	No. 2, 2009 rookie draft	Claremont	2009	—N/a
Damien Berto	16 June 1967	No. 80, 1988 national draft	St Mary's	—N/a	1989^{[a]}
Paul Blair	27 January 1978	No. 11, 1997 rookie draft	Subiaco	1997	—N/a
Tom Blechynden	10 January 2000	2022 Covid top-up player	South Fremantle	2022	—N/a
Lewis Broome	2 March 1991	No. 11, 2010 rookie draft	Claremont	2010–2011	—N/a
Paddy Brophy	22 February 1994	No. 45, 2015 rookie draft	Kildare GAA	2015–2017	—N/a
Coby Burgiel	9 September 2004	No. 29, 2022 national draft	Gippsland Power	—N/a	2023–2024
Matthew Burton^{[b]}	19 May 1970	No. 36, 1990 national draft	Subiaco	—N/a	1991–1993
Travis Burton	27 July 1974	No. 34, 1992 national draft	Subiaco	—N/a	1993–1994
Dean Buszan	12 December 1980	No. 4, 2001 rookie draft	Peel Thunder	2001–2002	—N/a
Corey Byrne	19 May 1997	2022 Covid top-up player	Perth	2022	—N/a
Damien Cavka	3 June 1996	No. 66, 2014 national draft	Calder Cannons	—N/a	2015–2016
Conrad Chambers	23 October 1979	No. 11, 1998 rookie draft	East Fremantle	1998	—N/a
Jonson Clifton	26 January 1978	No. 44, 1995 national draft	Swan Districts	—N/a	1996–1997
Gavin Cooney	17 April 1969	No. 69, 1990 national draft	Clarence	—N/a	1991^{[a]}
Jeremy Crough	30 January 1970	No. 38, 1988 national draft	South Bendigo	—N/a	1989
Rhys Croxford	21 March 1974	No. 94, 1992 national draft	Claremont	—N/a	1993
Steven Davies	1 April 1972	No. 25, 1991 national draft	Subiaco	—N/a	1992–1993
Joey Deegan	16 December 1998	2022 Covid top-up player	West Coast	2022	—N/a
Jason Disney	28 July 1974	No. 41, 1992 pre-season draft	Box Hill	—N/a	1992
Joel Duckworth	18 May 1980	No. 89, 1998 national draft	East Fremantle	—N/a	1999–2000
Simon Duckworth	26 June 1978	No. 9, 1999 rookie draft	West Perth	1999–2000	—N/a
Jeremy Dyer	23 August 1976	No. 44, 1994 national draft	Geelong Falcons	—N/a	1995
Travis Edmonds^{[c]}	9 February 1972	No. 35, 1993 pre-season draft	Swan Districts	—N/a	1993
Brad Edwards^{[d]}	22 February 1968	No. 49, 1991 pre-season draft	Perth	—N/a	1991
Sam Fisher	23 February 1998	2022 Covid top-up player	Swan Districts	2022	—N/a
Peter Freeman^{[e]}	1 April 1969	No. 41, 1991 national draft	St Kilda	—N/a	1992
Andrew Geddes	2 November 1970	No. 94, 1988 national draft	Katunga	—N/a	1989
Thomas Gorter	10 September 1996	No. 12, 2017 rookie draft	East Perth	2017	—N/a
Paul Gow^{[f]}	27 May 1969	1991 trade	Footscray	—N/a	1992
Damon Greaves	25 April 2000	2022 Covid top-up player	East Perth	2022	—N/a
Brendan Green	11 December 1970	No. 49, 1993 pre-season draft	Claremont	—N/a	1993
Anton Hamp	21 July 1992	No. 27, 2011 rookie draft	Claremont	2010–2012	—N/a
Brandon Hill	18 March 1980	No. 10, 1998 national draft	Peel Thunder	—N/a	1999–2000
Bret Hutchinson^{[g]}	6 March 1964	No. 38, 1990 pre-season draft	Subiaco	—N/a	1990
Don Langsford	7 May 1959	Inaugural squad selection	Swan Districts	—N/a	1987–1989^{[h]}
Coen Livingstone	25 May 2005	Category B rookie selection	Perth	2024–2025	—N/a
Dylan Main	2 September 1995	No. 49, 2013 national draft	South Fremantle	—N/a	2014–2015
Will Maginness	13 January 1995	No. 4, 2014 rookie draft	Oakleigh Chargers	2013–2015	—N/a
Peter Mann^{[i]}	7 September 1970	No. 1, 1989 pre-draft pick	Claremont	—N/a	1989
Michael Mascoulis	27 January 1993 (died 29 November 2013)	No. 15, 2011 rookie draft	Northern Knights	2012	—N/a
Luke Meadows	16 November 1994	2022 Covid top-up player	West Perth	2022	—N/a
Andrew McCarrey	28 December 1982	No. 35, 2001 rookie draft	East Fremantle	2001–2002	—N/a
Toby McGrath	11 October 1980	No. 12, 2000 rookie draft	South Fremantle	2000	—N/a
Nathan McIntosh	11 October 1968	1991 father/son selection	Subiaco	—N/a	1992
Craig McNaughton	27 November 1970	No. 10, 1990 mid-season draft	Sandhurst	—N/a	1990–1992
Kris Miller	29 September 1980	No. 48, 2001 rookie draft	East Fremantle	2001–2002	—N/a
Steven Miller	7 November 2000	2022 Covid top-up player	Claremont	2022	—N/a
Kane Morphett	17 March 1972	No. 21, 1991 national draft	East Fremantle	—N/a	1992
David Muir^{[j]}	17 July 1971	No. 109, 1992 national draft	Claremont	—N/a	1993
Todd Nener	6 March 1978	No. 56, 1997 rookie draft	Southport	1997–1998	—N/a
Jarrad Oakley-Nicholls^{[k]}	9 February 1988	No. 53, 2010 rookie draft	Richmond	2010–2011	—N/a
David Ogg^{[l]}	23 November 1967	No. 27, 1992 pre-season draft	Swan Districts	—N/a	1992–1993
Callum Papertalk	12 August 1992	No. 33, 2011 rookie draft	East Fremantle	2011–2012	—N/a
Chad Pearson	14 February 1998	2022 Covid top-up player	South Fremantle	2022	—N/a
Mark Pearson	13 May 1980	No. 24, 1999 rookie draft	West Perth	1999	—N/a
Shane Porter	31 January 1972	No. 12, 1990 national draft	North Launceston	—N/a	1991
Rowen Powell	17 September 1995	No. 22, 2014 rookie draft	Claremont	2014–2015	—N/a
Jackson Ramsay	20 November 1994	2022 Covid top-up player	East Perth	2022	—N/a
David Regan	18 September 1972	1991 trade	Essendon	—N/a	1992
Matt Richardson	6 January 1970	No. 66, 1988 national draft	Warracknabeal	—N/a	1989^{[a]}
Ben Robbins^{[m]}	21 December 1976	No. 33, 1993 national draft	Gippsland Power	—N/a	1994–1995
Clancy Rudeforth	1 February 1983	No. 35, 2002 rookie draft	Claremont	2002–2004	—N/a
Angus Schumacher	16 March 1999	2022 Covid top-up player	East Perth	2022	—N/a
Stephen Schwerdt^{[n]}	28 May 1968	No. 78, 1989 national draft	Central District	—N/a	1990
Ben Sharp	7 October 1986	No. 9, 2005 rookie draft	Oakleigh Chargers	2005–2007	—N/a
Trent Simpson	18 August 1976	No. 41, 1997 rookie draft	Subiaco	1997–1998	—N/a
Brad Smith	11 May 1979	No. 57, 2004 national draft	Subiaco	—N/a	2005–2006
Craig Smoker^{[o]}	4 April 1979	No. 30, 1995 national draft	West Perth	—N/a	1996–1997
Jordan Snadden	2 August 1997	No. 17, 2016 rookie draft	East Fremantle	—N/a	2016–2017
Llane Spaanderman^{[p]}	10 February 1986	No. 31, 2007 rookie draft	East Perth	2007	—N/a
Jason Spinks	9 October 1971	No. 71, 1994 national draft	South Fremantle	—N/a	1995
Will Sullivan	24 August 1989	No. 43, 2008 rookie draft	Western Jets	2007–2010	—N/a
Zane Sumich	31 August 1998	2022 Covid top-up player	West Coast	2022	—N/a
Andrew Taylor	10 February 1980	No. 38, 1999 rookie draft	Perth	2000	—N/a
James Thomson	18 February 1988	No. 80, 2006 national draft	Claremont	—N/a	2007–2008
Scott Thompson	15 March 1975	No. 17, 1994 pre-season draft	Subiaco	—N/a	1994
Ashley Thornton	29 December 1986	No. 40, 2005 rookie draft	Peel Thunder	2005–2007	—N/a
Luke Trew	17 February 1978	No. 14, 1995 national draft	Murray Bushrangers	—N/a	1996
Lee Walker^{[q]}	7 February 1973	No. 19, 1992 national draft	East Perth	—N/a	1993–1994
Dean Warwick	18 April 1963	Inaugural squad selection	West Perth	—N/a	1987–1988^{[h]}
Alec Waterman	19 August 1996	2016 rookie draft	Claremont	2016	—N/a
Tim Watson^{[r]}	13 July 1961	No. 13, 1992 pre-season draft	Essendon	—N/a	1992^{[a]}
Tobe Watson	3 December 1997	2022 Covid top-up player	Swan Districts	2022	—N/a
Ryan Webb	6 July 1976	No. 26, 1997 rookie draft	West Perth	1997	—N/a
Paul Whitelaw	15 February 1978	No. 57, 1995 national draft	West Perth	—N/a	1996–1997
Mark Williams	8 January 1973	No. 83, 1990 national draft	Sandhurst	—N/a	1991^{[a]}
Scott Williamson	7 November 1970	No. 44, 1988 national draft	Wangaratta Rovers	—N/a	1989^{[a]}
Heath Younie	15 February 1978	No. 59, 1998 rookie draft	Murray Bushrangers	1998–2000	—N/a
Logan Young	14 March 2002	2022 Covid top-up player	West Coast	2022	—N/a

Notes

^{a} For various reasons, a number of players drafted in the late 1980s and early 1990s refused to live in Western Australia, instead choosing to remain and play football in their home states.
^{b} Burton later played 70 games with Fremantle and 77 games with the Kangaroos.
^{c} Edmonds later played one game with Fremantle.
^{d} Edwards had previously played six games with Fitzroy and 10 with the Brisbane Bears.
^{e} Freeman had previously played five games with St Kilda.
^{f} Gow had previously played seven games with Footscray.
^{g} Hutchinson had previously played one game with Melbourne.
^{h} Inaugural squad member.
^{i} Mann later played 39 games with North Melbourne and 77 games with Fremantle.

^{j} Muir later played 20 games with Fremantle.
^{k} Oakley-Nicholls had previously played 13 games with Richmond.
^{l} Ogg had previously played nine games with the Brisbane Bears.
^{m} Robbins later played five games with the Brisbane Bears, 47 games with the Brisbane Lions, and 40 games with the Kangaroos.
^{n} Schwerdt later played 25 games with Adelaide.
^{o} Smoker later played 17 games with Melbourne.
^{p} Spaanderman had previously played three games with the Brisbane Lions.
^{q} Walker later played 16 games with Collingwood.
^{r} Watson played 307 games with Essendon before and after his drafting by West Coast.

== West Coast Eagles AFLW players ==
Key
Order	Players are listed in order of debut
Seasons	Includes West Coast only careers and spans from when a player was first listed with the club to their final year on the list
Debut	Debuts are for AFLW regular season and finals series matches only
Games	Statistics are for AFLW regular season and finals games only and are correct as of round ten, 2024.
Goals	Statistics are for AFLW regular season and finals games only and are correct as of round ten, 2024.

№	Name	Debut	Seasons	Games	Goals
1	Mikayla Bowen	round 1, 2020	2020–2022 (S7)	25	8
2	Kellie Gibson^	round 1, 2020	2020–	60	32
3	Courtney Guard	round 1, 2020	2020–2022 (S6)	21	0
4	McKenzie Dowrick	round 1, 2020	2020–2021	5	1
5	Beatrice Devlyn	round 1, 2020	2020–2021	6	0
6	Maddy Collier	round 1, 2020	2020–2022 (S6)	19	3
7	Ashlee Atkins	round 1, 2020	2020–2022 (S6)	23	3
8	Danika Pisconeri	round 1, 2020	2020	3	0
9	Niamh Kelly	round 1, 2020	2020–2022 (S6)	22	5
10	Emma Swanson^	round 1, 2020	2020–	68	10
11	Belinda Smith^	round 1, 2020	2020–	64	2
12	Grace Kelly	round 1, 2020	2020–2022 (S6)	23	9
13	Ashton Hill	round 1, 2020	2020–2022 (S6)	9	0
14	Dana Hooker	round 1, 2020	2020-2025	45	7
15	Imahra Cameron	round 1, 2020	2020–2022 (S7)	23	10
16	Tarnee Tester	round 1, 2020	2020	4	1
17	Hayley Bullas	round 1, 2020	2020–2022 (S7)	30	5
18	Parris Laurie	round 1, 2020	2020–2022 (S6)	25	1
19	Talia Radan	round 1, 2020	2020	6	0
20	Chantella Perera	round 1, 2020	2020–2021	13	0
21	Sophie McDonald	round 1, 2020	2020–2025	37	0
22	Kate Orme	round 2, 2020	2020–2021	7	1
23	Emily Bonser	round 3, 2020	2020	3	0
24	Cassie Davidson	round 4, 2020	2020	3	0
25	Emily McGuire	round 4, 2020	2020	3	0
26	Melissa Caulfield	round 5, 2020	2020–2022 (S6)	13	3
27	Mhicca Carter	round 6, 2020	2020–2021	1	0
28	Brianna Green	round 1, 2021	2021	4	0
29	Bella Lewis^	round 1, 2021	2021–	67	16
30	Aisling McCarthy	round 1, 2021	2021–2023	31	10
31	Tayla Bresland	round 1, 2021	2021–2022 (S6)	8	0
32	Andrea Gilmore	round 1, 2021	2020–2022 (S6)	11	1
33	Demi Liddle	round 1, 2021	2021	4	0
34	Shanae Davison	round 1, 2021	2021–2023	18	1
35	Amber Ward	round 1, 2021	2021–2022 (S6)	14	0
36	Katelyn Pope	round 2, 2021	2021	6	1
37	Alicia Janz	round 4, 2021	2021	6	0
38	Lauren Gauci	round 4, 2021	2021–2022 (S6)	8	0
39	Charlie Thomas^	round 1, 2022	2022 (S6)–	57	4
40	Aimee Schmidt	round 1, 2022	2021–2023	26	13
41	Evangeline Gooch	round 1, 2022	2022 (S6)–2024	21	1
42	Sarah Lakay^	round 3, 2022	2022 (S6)–	42	4
43	Courtney Rowley^	round 3, 2022	2022 (S6)–	36	4
44	Emily Bennett	round 7, 2022	2022 (S6)–2022 (S7)	9	0
45	Beth Schilling^	round 9, 2022	2022 (S6)–	18	0
46	Ella Roberts^	round 1, 2022 (S7)	2022 (S7)–	47	19
47	Sasha Goranova	round 1, 2022 (S7)	2022 (S7)–2024	21	0
48	Isabella Simmons	round 1, 2022 (S7)	2022 (S7)–2023	7	1
49	Jessica Sedunary	round 1, 2022 (S7)	2022 (S7)–2023	14	0
50	Emma Humphries	round 1, 2022 (S7)	2022 (S7)–2023	13	2
51	Kate Bartlett	round 1, 2022 (S7)	2020; 2022 (S7)–2023	16	6
52	Mikayla Western^	round 1, 2022 (S7)	2022 (S7)–	39	10
53	Krstel Petrevski	round 1, 2022 (S7)	2022 (S7)–2023	6	0
54	Eleanor Hartill	round 3, 2022 (S7)	2022 (S7)–2023	16	1
55	Jaide Britton^	round 4, 2022 (S7)	2022 (S7)–	40	3
56	Abbygail Bushby^	round 5, 2022 (S7)	2022 (S7)–	31	7
57	Ella Smith	round 6, 2022 (S7)	2022 (S7)–2023	5	0
58	Ashleigh Gomes	round 9, 2022 (S7)	2022 (S7)–2023	2	1
59	Lauren Wakfer^	round 1, 2023	2022 (S7)–	38	12
60	Amy Franklin^	round 1, 2023	2023–	30	20
61	Emily Elkington	round 1, 2023	2023–2024	5	0
62	Zoe Wakfer^	round 3, 2023	2023–	34	0
63	Mackenzie Webb	round 9, 2023	2023–2024	3	0
64	Jessica Rentsch^	round 1, 2024	2024–	20	0
65	Alison Drennan^	round 1, 2024	2024–	18	2
66	Jess Hosking	round 1, 2024	2024	8	4
67	Verity Simmons	round 1, 2024	2024	7	1
68	Sanne Bakker^	round 1, 2024	2024–	20	1
69	Georgie Cleaver^	round 1, 2024	2024–	24	0
70	Tess Lyons	round 1, 2024	2024	4	0
71	Jayme Harken	round 2, 2024	2024	5	1
72	Octavia Di Donato	round 3, 2024	2024	5	2
73	Roxanne Roux^	round 5, 2024	2024–	20	1
74	Lucia Painter^	round 1, 2025	2025–	15	12
75	Liz McGrath^	round 1, 2025	2025–	8	0
76	Kayla Dalgleish^	round 1, 2025	2025–	12	6
77	Kayley Kavanagh	round 2, 2025	2024–2025	7	1
78	Charlotte Riggs^	round 3, 2025	2025–	15	5
79	Courtney Lindgren	round 3, 2025	2025	2	0
80	Annabel Johnson	round 6, 2025	2024–2025	4	0
81	Lisa Steane^	round 7, 2025	2025-	2	0
82	Lucy Boyd	round 10, 2025	2025	2	0
83	Mia Russo^	round 1, 2026	2026–	3	0
84	Keeley Skepper^	round 1, 2026	2026–	4	3
85	Ella Slocombe^	round 1, 2026	2026–	4	1
86	Isabella Shannon^	round 1, 2026	2026–	3	1
87	Jovie Skewes-Clinton^	round 1, 2026	2026–	1	0
88	Natasha Entwistle^	round 2, 2026	2026–	3	0

=== Listed players yet to play a senior game for West Coast ===
Player	Draft	Recruited From			
Player	Draft	Recruited From	Lily Paterson	2025 trade period	Port Adelaide
Sienna Gerardi	2026 pre-season draft, pick 6	Swan Districts			
Lily Smart	2026 pre-season draft, pick 11	Sturt			

=== Listed players who didn't play a senior game for West Coast ===
Player	Acquired	Time listed			
Player	Acquired	Time listed	Rosie Deegan	Expansion signing, 2019	2020
Julie-Anne Norrish	2020 draft, pick 32	2021			
Matilda Sergeant	2023 draft, pick 42	2024			

== See also ==
- List of West Coast Eagles coaches
