= 2010 West Coast Eagles season =

West Coast Eagles
2010 season
- President: Mark Barnaba
- Coach: John Worsfold
- Captain: Darren Glass
- Home ground: Subiaco Oval
- Pre-season competition: Quarter-finals
- AFL season: 16th (last)
- Finals series: Did not compete
- Best & Fairest: Mark LeCras
- Leading goalkicker: Mark LeCras (63)
- Highest home attendance: 40,886 vs. Fremantle, 2 May
- Lowest home attendance: 26,976 vs. Adelaide, 10 July
- Average home attendance: 34 931

The 2010 season was the West Coast Eagles' 24th season in the AFL. The Eagles finished 16th and last to record their first wooden spoon in the competition, just four years after their premiership season of 2006. West Coast played 22 games, including 12 at Subiaco Oval, winning just four and losing the remaining eighteen.

== Pre-season ==
=== Trades ===
West Coast was involved in one trade before the 2010 season - a three-way trade involving Brisbane Lions and Sydney. West Coast traded Brent Staker and draft picks 39 and 55 to Brisbane in exchange for Bradd Dalziell, and then traded Mark Seaby to Sydney in exchange for draft picks 22 and 118. Sydney then traded Amon Buchanan to Brisbane in exchange for pick 28.

=== Draft selections ===
- **National draft selections**

7 - Brad Sheppard (East Fremantle)
22 - Gerrick Weedon (Claremont)
23 - Koby Stevens (Gippsland Power)

- **Pre-season draft selections**

5 - Ryan Neates (Claremont)

- **Rookie draft selections**

11 - Lewis Broome (Claremont)
27 - Andrew Strijk (West Perth)
40 - Ashton Hams (South Fremantle)
53 - Jarrad Oakley-Nicholls (Richmond)

=== NAB Cup ===
Home team's score listed in bold.

Round	Date	Score	Opponent	Opponent's Score	Result	Venue	Attendance
1	Friday, 12 February 5:40pm	**1.16.12 (117)**	Essendon	0.12.10 (82)	Won by 35 points	Subiaco Oval	23 860
QF	Saturday, 27 February 5:40pm	**2.8.14 (80)**	Port Adelaide	4.19.8 (158)	Lost by 78 points	Subiaco Oval	16 231

== List ==
=== Squad ===
West Coast Eagles
Senior list		Rookie list	Coaching staff
1 Mitch Brown; 2 Mark LeCras; 4 Daniel Kerr; 5 Brad Ebert; 6 Mark Nicoski; 7 Chris Masten; 8 Beau Waters (vc); 9 Nic Naitanui; 10 Scott Selwood; 11 Matt Priddis (vc); 12 Brad Sheppard; 13 Luke Shuey; 14 Koby Stevens; 15 Tom Swift; 16 Eric MacKenzie; 17 Josh Kennedy (vc); 18 Bradd Dalziell; 19 Tim Houlihan; 20 Dean Cox (vc)	21 Quinten Lynch; 22 Ryan Neates; 23 Darren Glass (c); 24 Matthew Rosa; 25 Shannon Hurn (vc); 26 Sam Butler; 27 Ben McKinley; 28 Ashley Smith; 29 Ashley Hansen; 30 Matthew Spangher; 31 Will Schofield; 32 Andrew Embley; 33 Jordan Jones; 34 Tony Notte; 35 Patrick McGinnity; 37 Adam Selwood (vc); 38 Brett Jones; 42 Beau Wilkes; 44 Gerrick Weedon	36 Callum Wilson; 39 Lewis Broome; 40 Will Sullivan; 41 Andrew Strijk; 43 Ashton Hams; 45 Jarrad Oakley-Nicholls; 47 Lewis Stevenson; 48 Adam Cockie	Head coach: John Worsfold; Legend: (c) Captain(s); (vc) Vice-captain(s)

=== Leadership group ===
The leadership group was composed of the captain Darren Glass, Dean Cox, Shannon Hurn, Josh Kennedy, Matt Priddis, Adam Selwood and Beau Waters. During the games when Glass was injured, all of these players rotated the captaincy.

== Results ==
Regular season results
Round	Date	Result	Score			Opponent	Score			Ground		Attendance	Ladder
Round	Date	Result	G	B	T	Opponent	G	B	T	Ground		Attendance	Ladder
1	Saturday 27 March	Lost	12	10	82	Brisbane Lions	16	18	114	The Gabba	A	29,201	13th
2	Saturday 3 April	Lost	12	14	86	Port Adelaide	13	11	89	Subiaco Oval	H	37,010	11th
3	Saturday 10 April	Lost	13	13	91	North Melbourne	17	14	116	Etihad Stadium	A	18,394	14th
4	Friday 16 April	Won	15	11	101	Essendon	11	12	78	Subiaco Oval	H	38,676	12th
5	Saturday 24 April	Lost	9	9	63	Sydney	17	13	115	Sydney Cricket Ground	A	28,422	13th
6	Sunday 2 May	Lost	10	13	73	Fremantle	17	9	111	Subiaco Oval	H	40,886	14th
7	Saturday 8 May	Won	15	12	102	Hawthorn	14	10	94	Subiaco Oval	H	35,864	13th
8	Saturday 15 May	Won	10	15	75	Melbourne	6	10	46	Melbourne Cricket Ground	A	28,592	13th
9	Sunday 23 May	Lost	8	8	56	St Kilda	13	13	91	Subiaco Oval	H	36,244	14th
10	Sunday 30 May	Lost	11	10	76	Carlton	15	15	105	Etihad Stadium	A	29,175	14th
11	Saturday 5 June	Lost	14	14	98	Geelong	18	14	122	Subiaco Oval	H	33,784	14th
12	Sunday 13 June	Lost	11	11	77	Richmond	19	12	126	Melbourne Cricket Ground	A	30,870	14th
13	Sunday 20 June	Lost	9	5	59	Western Bulldogs	17	17	119	Subiaco Oval	H	34,280	15th
14	Saturday 3 July	Lost	7	10	52	Collingwood	20	15	135	Etihad Stadium	A	38,781	16th
15	Saturday 10 July	Lost	14	11	95	Adelaide	17	15	117	Subiaco Oval	H	26,976	16th
16	Saturday 17 July	Won	20	12	132	Essendon	14	16	100	Etihad Stadium	A	26,991	16th
17	Saturday 24 July	Lost	11	17	83	Carlton	15	19	109	Subiaco Oval	H	35,925	16th
18	Sunday 1 August	Lost	13	7	85	Fremantle	24	16	160	Subiaco Oval	A	40,451	16th
19	Saturday 7 August	Lost	9	11	65	Brisbane Lions	10	10	70	Subiaco Oval	H	32,587	16th
20	Saturday 14 August	Lost	8	12	60	Port Adelaide	8	13	61	AAMI Stadium	A	14,113	16th
21	Sunday 22 August	Lost	14	10	94	North Melbourne	16	14	110	Subiaco Oval	H	32,007	16th
22	Saturday 28 August	Lost	10	8	68	Geelong	16	16	112	Skilled Stadium	A	24,099	16th

Key
H	Home game
A	Away game

=== Ladder ===
2010 AFL ladder
Pos	Team	Pld	W	L	D	PF	PA	PP	Pts	
1	Collingwood (P)	22	17	4	1	2349	1658	141.7	70	Finals series
2	Geelong	22	17	5	0	2518	1702	147.9	68	Finals series
3	St Kilda	22	15	6	1	1935	1591	121.6	62	Finals series
4	Western Bulldogs	22	14	8	0	2174	1734	125.4	56	Finals series
5	Sydney	22	13	9	0	2017	1863	108.3	52	Finals series
6	Fremantle	22	13	9	0	2168	2087	103.9	52	Finals series
7	Hawthorn	22	12	9	1	2044	1847	110.7	50	Finals series
8	Carlton	22	11	11	0	2143	1983	108.1	44	Finals series
9	North Melbourne	22	11	11	0	1930	2208	87.4	44	
10	Port Adelaide	22	10	12	0	1749	2123	82.4	40	
11	Adelaide	22	9	13	0	1763	1870	94.3	36	
12	Melbourne	22	8	13	1	1863	1971	94.5	34	
13	Brisbane Lions	22	7	15	0	1775	2158	82.3	28	
14	Essendon	22	7	15	0	1930	2402	80.3	28	
15	Richmond	22	6	16	0	1714	2348	73.0	24	
16	West Coast	22	4	18	0	1773	2300	77.1	16	

Source: AFL ladder
Rules for classification: 1) points; 2) percentage; 3) number of points for.
(P) Premiers

== Awards ==
=== League awards ===
- Mark LeCras was selected in the forward pocket for the 2010 All-Australian team.
- Nic Naitanui was nominated for the 2010 AFL Rising Star Award.
- Mark LeCras placed third in the Coleman Medal, scoring 63 goals for the season.
- Matt Priddis received the most votes for the club in the 2010 Brownlow Medal, receiving 13 votes out of the club's total of 31 votes.

=== Club awards ===
The 2010 West Coast Eagles Club Champion Awards were held on Saturday, 11 September at Crown Perth. Mark LeCras was named Club Champion, Mark Nicoski received the Best Clubman award and Nic Naitanui was awarded Rookie of the Year. Mark LeCras was also leading goal-kicker, kicking 63 goals for the year. Josh Kennedy was next, with 41 goals. The voting for the Club Champion Award went as follows:

2010 Club Champion
Position	Name	Votes
1	Mark LeCras	294
2	Matt Priddis	286
3	Beau Waters	281
4	Dean Cox	271
5	Nic Naitanui	252
6	Josh Kennedy	251
7	Matt Rosa	247
8	Andrew Embley	246
9	Brad Ebert	241
10	Scott Selwood	227

== Season records and milestones ==
=== Team records ===
- Highest home attendance: 40 886 vs. Fremantle at Subiaco Oval, 2 May
- Highest away attendance: 38 781 vs. Collingwood at Etihad Stadium, 3 July
- Highest team score for: 20.12 (132) vs. Essendon at Etihad Stadium, 17 July
- Highest team score against: 24.16 (160) by Fremantle at Subiaco Oval, 1 August
- Lowest team score for: 7:10 (52) vs. Collingwood at Etihad Stadium, 3 July
- Lowest team score against: 6.10 (46) by Melbourne at the MCG, 15 May
- Most consecutive wins: 2 (rounds 7 and 8)
- Most consecutive losses: 7 (between rounds 9 and 15)
- Highest score by quarter:
  - 1st quarter - 6.5 (41) vs. North Melbourne at Etihad Stadium, 10 April
  - 2nd quarter - 6.4 (40) vs. Essendon at Etihad Stadium, 17 July
  - 3rd quarter - 6.2 (38) vs. Essendon at Etihad Stadium, 17 July
  - 4th quarter - 5.4 (34) vs. Hawthorn at Subiaco Oval, 8 May

Source: AFL Tables

=== Player records ===
- Most games: 22 - Dean Cox, Brad Ebert, Josh J. Kennedy and Nic Naitanui
- Most goals: 63 - Mark LeCras
- Most goals in a game: 12.2 - Mark LeCras vs Essendon at Etihad Stadium, 17 July
- Most kicks: 267 - Brad Ebert
- Most kicks in a game: 21 - Shannon Hurn vs Geelong at Subiaco Oval, 5 June
- Most handballs: 336 - Matt Priddis
- Most handballs in a game: 29 - Matt Priddis vs St Kilda at Subiaco Oval, 23 May
- Most possessions: 488 - Matt Priddis
- Most possession in a game: 36 - Matt Priddis vs North Melbourne at Etihad Stadium, 10 April
- Most contested possessions: 226 - Matt Priddis
- Most marks: 146 - Beau Waters
- Most marks in a game: 17 - Beau Waters vs Geelong at Subiaco Oval, 5 June
- Most contested marks: 28 - Josh J. Kennedy
- Most Inside-50s: 84 - Andrew Embley
- Most tackles: 130 - Matt Priddis
- Most tackles in a game: 15 - Matt Priddis vs Fremantle at Subiaco Oval, 2 May
- Most hit-outs: 502 - Dean Cox
- Most hit-outs in a game: 35 - Dean Cox vs AFL Haw at Subiaco Oval, 8 May

Source: West Coast Eagles 2010 Statistics

=== Milestones ===
- Andrew Embley played his 200th game.
- Dean Cox played his 200th game.
- Brett Jones played his 100th game.
- Josh J. Kennedy played his 50th game, and his 50th game for the Eagles.
- Brad Ebert played his 50th game.

=== Debuts ===
- Luke Shuey (round 1)
- Ashton Hams (round 4)
- Lewis Stevenson (round 5)
- Brad Sheppard (round 7)
- Andrew Strijk (round 13)
- Koby Stevens (round 13)
- Ashley Smith (round 15)
- Jordan Jones (round 21)
