= 2018 WAFL season =

Australian rules football season

- Teams: 9
- Premiers: Subiaco; 14th premiership
- Minor premiers: Subiaco; 16th minor premiership
- Sandover Medallist: Jye Bolton; Claremont (52 votes)
- Bernie Naylor Medallist: Tyler Keitel; Andrew Strijk; West Perth (43 goals)

The 2018 WAFL season (officially the 2018 McDonald's WAFL Premiership Season) is the 134th season of the various incarnations of the West Australian Football League (WAFL). The season commenced on 30 March 2018 and concluded with the 2018 WAFL Grand Final on 22 September 2018.

== Ladder ==
2018 ladder
Pos	Team	Pld	W	L	D	PF	PA	PP	Pts
1	Subiaco (P)	18	18	0	0	2051	926	221.5	72
2	South Fremantle	18	13	5	0	1688	1251	134.9	52
3	West Perth	18	11	7	0	1615	1377	117.3	44
4	Claremont	18	9	9	0	1406	1434	98.0	36
5	East Perth	18	8	10	0	1581	1486	106.4	32
6	Perth	18	7	11	0	1465	1756	83.4	28
7	Peel Thunder	18	7	11	0	1232	1536	80.2	28
8	Swan Districts	18	6	12	0	1379	1675	82.3	24
9	East Fremantle	18	2	16	0	1079	2055	52.5	8

Source: WAFL Footy Facts
Rules for classification: 1) points; 2) percentage; 3) number of points for.
(P) Premiers

== Clubs ==
Club	Home ground	Location	Captain	Coach
Claremont	Claremont Oval	Claremont	Ian Richardson	Darren Harris
East Fremantle	East Fremantle Oval	East Fremantle	Jamie McNamara	Robert Wiley
East Perth	Leederville Oval	Leederville	Patrick McGinnity; Kyle Anderson	Luke Webster
Peel Thunder	Rushton Park	Mandurah	Gerald Ugle	Cam Shepherd
Perth	Lathlain Park	Lathlain	Clinton Jones	Earl Spalding
South Fremantle	Fremantle Oval	Fremantle	Dylan Main	Todd Curley
Subiaco	Leederville Oval	Leederville	Kyal Horsley	Jarrad Schofield
Swan Districts	Bassendean Oval	Bassendean	David Ellard; Tony Notte	Adam Pickering
West Perth	Arena Joondalup	Joondalup	Aaron Black	Bill Monaghan

== Finals series ==
=== Qualifying and Elimination Finals ===
	Qualifying Final
Saturday 1 September (2:40pm)	South Fremantle 22.12 (144)	def.	West Perth 6.10 (46)	Fremantle Community Bank Oval (crowd: 3,099)	Report

	Elimination Final
Sunday 2 September (2:40pm)	Claremont 12.11 (83)	def.	East Perth 8.7 (55)	Claremont Oval (crowd: 3,669)	Report

=== Semi-finals ===
	First semi-final
Sunday 9 September (2:15pm)	West Perth 19.9 (123)	def.	Claremont 10.10 (70)	Claremont Oval (crowd: 3,102)	Report

	Second semi-final
Sunday 9 September (3:10pm)	Subiaco 12.12 (84)	def.	South Fremantle 10.6 (66)	Leederville Oval (crowd: 3,287)	Report

=== Preliminary final ===
	Preliminary final
Sunday 16 September (2:40pm)	South Fremantle 9.17 (71)	def. by	West Perth 15.7 (97)	Fremantle Community Bank Oval (crowd: 3,907)	Report

=== Grand Final ===
2018 WAFL Grand Final
Sunday 23 September (2:40pm)	Subiaco	def.	West Perth	Optus Stadium (crowd: 25,064)	Report
4.4 (28); 9.8 (62); 15.11 (101); 19.13 (127)	Q1; Q2; Q3; Final	0.1 (1); 2.3 (15); 4.3 (27); 7.4 (46)	Umpires: Matthew Adams, Ben Laycock, Justin Power; Simpson Medal: Kyal Horsley (Subiaco); Television broadcast: Seven Network
Halligan, Sokol 5; Waters 3; Horsley 2; Newton, Phelan, Wheeler, Clarke 1	Goals	Black, Chalmers 2; Strijk, Peirce, Mills 1
Horsley, Deluca, Clarke, Sokol, Lockyer, Kitchin, Phelan, Halligan, Litherland	Best	Black, Nelson, Peirce, Wilhelm, Chalmers
Subiaco became the second team in WAFL history to complete a perfect season after East Fremantle in 1946.
