= Josh Kennedy =

Josh Kennedy may refer to:

- Joshua Kennedy (born 1982), Australian soccer player
- Josh Kennedy (footballer, born 1987), Australian rules footballer with the West Coast Eagles and previously Carlton Football Club
- Josh Kennedy (footballer, born 1988), Australian rules footballer with the Sydney Swans and previously Hawthorn
