= Mark Nicoski =

Australian rules footballer (born 1983)

Personal information
- Full name: Mark Nicoski
- Nickname: "Nico"
- Born: 24 November 1983 (age 42)
- Original team: Carine JFC
- Draft: 25th pick, 2003 Rookie Draft (WC)
- Height: 188 cm (6 ft 2 in)
- Weight: 85 kg (187 lb)
- Position: Utility

Playing career^{1}
Years	Club	Games (Goals)
2004–2013	West Coast	112 (61)

International team honours
Years	Team	Games (Goals)
2011	Australia	2 (0)
- ^{1} Playing statistics correct to the end of 2013.

Career highlights
- WAFL Rookie of the Year 2003; Subiaco premiership side 2006, 2007; West Coast Best Clubman 2010

Mark Nicoski (born 24 November 1983) is a former Australian rules footballer who previously played with the West Coast Eagles in the Australian Football League (AFL). From Perth, Western Australia, Nicoski first played for Subiaco in the West Australian Football League (WAFL), before being recruited by West Coast in the 2003 Rookie Draft. Promoted from the rookie list prior to the 2004 season, he made his debut for the club in round five, and became a regular in the side the following season as a half-back flanker, playing in West Coast's grand final loss to Sydney. In 2006, Nicoski fractured an ankle midway through the season, and thus missed out on playing in the club's premiership victory. Over the next seasons, shoulder and groin injuries restricted his time on the field, but in 2011 he took up a different role in the team, kicking 41 goals playing as a forward. Nicoski also represented Australia in the 2011 International Rules Series. However, after serious injuries, including a torn hamstring during the final of the 2012 pre-season tournament, he did not play at AFL level over the following two seasons. Having played 112 games for West Coast, Nicoski retired from the AFL at the end of the 2013 season.

== Football career ==
The son of Don and Karen Nicoski, Nicoski has Macedonian heritage on his father's side and Croatian heritage on his mother's side. Nicoski attended Carine Senior High School, where he played for the school's football team, as well as the Carine Junior Football Club. He did not play for Western Australia in the Under-18 National Championships due to injury, but made his senior debut for Subiaco in the West Australian Football League in round 20 of the 2002 season, playing two more games before his club was eliminated by East Perth in the semi-final.

Nicoski was recruited by the West Coast Eagles with pick number 25 in the 2003 Rookie Draft. He had a stand-out season for Subiaco in the WAFL, playing 21 games, including the grand final to West Perth, as a half-back flanker. He shared the 2003 WAFL Rookie of the Year Award with Zach Beeck, and was promoted to West Coast's senior list for the 2004 season. After spending the first four rounds in the WAFL, Nicoski made his debut for West Coast against Carlton in round five of the 2004 season, recording 16 disposals. He played a further 10 consecutive games, as a rebounding defender or on the wing, before injuring his shoulder in round 15 against Hawthorn. He returned for one WAFL game in round 21, but did not play any further AFL games. Nicoski played for Subiaco for the first two rounds of the 2005 season, before being selected in the Eagles' team for round two against Geelong. He played every game for the rest of the season, kicking 12 goals as a rebounding half-back flanker, and was considered one of the Eagles' best in the club's Grand Final loss to Sydney. Nicoski was in career-best form at the beginning of the 2006 season, and received Brownlow Medal votes for his games against Richmond and Melbourne, before fracturing his ankle against Hawthorn in round 14. He spent 11 weeks on the sidelines, with Subiaco granted special dispensation from the WAFL to allow him to play for the club in the 2006 WAFL Grand Final in an attempt to prove his fitness for the 2006 AFL Grand Final. Nicoski played in Subiaco's premiership win over South Fremantle but was not selected to play in West Coast's premiership-winning team.

In an intra-club practice match during the 2006–07 off-season, Nicoski severely dislocated his shoulder, forcing him to miss the first half of the 2007 season. He returned in round 12 against St Kilda, but re-injured his shoulder in the next game against Adelaide. He returned to the side in round 22, playing the last three games of the season before returning to Subiaco, where he again played in a premiership. Nicoski played 19 of 22 games in the 2008 season, but was not at his best, and was dropped twice, although he still managed to finish seventh in West Coast's Club Champion Award. He played 13 of the club's first 15 games in 2009, before a groin injury forced him to miss the rest of the season. He returned in round one of the 2010 season, and was switched to a role as a defensive forward, but struggled for form due to his shoulder. He played six games before opting to end his season after round 12 for surgery. He spent the rest of the season as a mentor to other small forwards Gerrick Weedon, Ryan Neates and Lewis Broome, and was awarded the Chris Mainwaring Medal as the Best Clubman at the Eagles' 2010 Club Champion Awards.

Nicoski returned to the Eagles' side in the 2011 season in a new role as a small forward. He played every game for the club, kicking 41 goals in 25 games. Nicoski's form was described as a factor in West Coast's turnaround from last place to fourth place over the season, with assistant coach Peter Sumich nominating him as "the most improved player on our list" and a "brand new footballer". He played his 100th game for the club against Carlton in round 14, finishing the season behind Josh Kennedy (59 goals) and Mark LeCras (47 goals) in West Coast's goalkicking. His six goals in the round 20 match against Richmond was a career-best. During the 2012 pre-season, Nicoski tore a tendon in his hamstring during the grand final of the 2012 NAB Cup against Adelaide. Initially predicted to miss twelve weeks, he suffered complications after his original surgery which led to a further round of surgery, and was ruled out for the remainder of the season in July 2012. Under new rules introduced by the AFL from the end of the 2012 season onwards, Nicoski was for a time listed as an unrestricted free agent, but signed a one-year extension to his contract with West Coast in October 2012. Due to further complications with his hamstring, he did not play during the early 2013 season, and he was placed on the club's long-term injury list in March 2013, with Callum Sinclair elevated to the senior list in his place.

Having not played for 14 months, Nicoski returned to football in May 2013, playing for Subiaco's reserves team. In a WAFL game the following month, Nicoski was again injured when an opposition landed heavily on his wrist, necessitated season-ending surgery. With his contract expiring at the season, he chose to retire from the AFL, although it is unclear whether he will continue playing for Subiaco. He and teammate Adam Selwood retired on the same day, having been recruited to West Coast at the same time.

== Personal life ==
Nicoski serves as an ambassador for the Samaritans Crisis Line, a crisis hotline. He is currently managed by Corporate Sports Australia. Beginning in October 2011, Nicoski has been an occasional presenter on Greenfingers, an Australian gardening show broadcast on the Seven Network.

He now works at Georgiana Molloy Anglican School as a HPE teacher and the Peak Program Coordinator.

== Statistics ==
Statistics correct as of 15 August 2013.

Season	Team	No.	Games	Totals							Averages (per game)						
Season	Team	No.	Games	G	B	K	H	D	M	T	G	B	K	H	D	M	T
2004	West Coast	31	11	1	1	74	49	123	28	21	0.1	0.1	6.7	4.5	11.2	2.5	1.9
2005	West Coast	31	21	12	7	202	120	322	100	38	0.6	0.3	9.6	5.7	15.3	4.8	1.8
2006	West Coast	31	12	5	3	146	76	222	49	21	0.4	0.3	12.2	6.3	18.5	4.1	1.8
2007	West Coast	6	5	0	1	41	32	73	24	4	0.0	0.2	6.8	5.3	12.2	4.0	0.7
2008	West Coast	6	19	2	3	185	124	309	78	31	0.1	0.2	9.8	6.5	16.3	4.1	1.6
2009	West Coast	6	13	0	3	112	80	192	34	21	0.0	0.2	8.6	6.2	14.8	2.6	1.6
2010	West Coast	6	6	0	4	33	32	65	26	11	0.0	0.7	5.5	5.3	10.8	4.3	1.8
2011	West Coast	6	25	41	25	214	105	319	72	70	1.6	1.0	8.6	4.2	12.8	2.9	2.8
Career			112	61	47	1007	618	1625	411	217	0.5	0.4	9.0	5.5	14.5	3.7	1.9

Legend
G	Goals	K	Kicks	D	Disposals	T	Tackles
B	Behinds	H	Handballs	M	Marks
