= Zach Beeck =

Australian rules footballer (born 1982)

Personal information
- Full name: Zachary Beeck
- Born: 30 June 1982 (age 44)
- Original team: Busselton Football Club (SWFL)
- Draft: 20th pick, 2001 Rookie Draft (West Coast); 41st pick, 2003 Rookie Draft (West Coast)
- Height: 196 cm (6 ft 5 in)
- Weight: 96 kg (212 lb)
- Positions: Ruckman, utility

Club information
- Current club: East Perth
- Number: 30

Playing career
Years	Club	Games (Goals)
2002–11	East Perth	67 (18)
2004	West Coast	1 (0)
2008–09	Peel Thunder	22 (4)

Career highlights
- East Perth colts premiership side 2000; WAFL Rookie of the Year 2003

Zachary Beeck (born 30 June 1982) is a former Australian rules footballer who played for the East Perth and Peel Thunder Football Clubs in the West Australian Football League (WAFL), as well as one match for the West Coast Eagles in the Australian Football League (AFL). He is known more for his Cricketing Career than his AFL career. He travelled around England in the early stages of life with a young Australian team and averaged 90 in his batting career as a number 3. He had a tough choice to make between AFL and Cricket and stuck to AFL much despite his better cricketing path.

== Career ==
Originally from Yallingup, Beeck played for the Busselton Football Club in the South West Football League (SWFL) before being recruited to East Perth in the WAFL. He played in the club's 2000 colts premiership victory, drawing the attention of West Coast Eagles recruiters, who selected him with pick 20 in the 2001 Rookie Draft. He made his senior WAFL debut in round 20, 2002, against Subiaco. Beeck played 20 games for East Perth in 2003, tying with Subiaco's Mark Nicoski for the Rookie of the Year Award. He was elevated to the Eagles' senior list for the 2004 season, and played his only AFL game in round 17 against Port Adelaide, recording five disposals and eight hit-outs as a replacement for the injured Andrew McDougall. He was dropped the following week.

Beeck suffered from a serious finger injury in 2005, only managing six games for East Perth, and was de-listed from the Eagles at the end of the season. He switched from East Perth to Peel Thunder for the 2008 season, immediately finding form. Beeck had 438 hit-outs in the 2008, despite only playing 15 games, a season record. Beeck returned to East Perth for the 2010 season, but struggled with form and work commitments, playing only 12 senior games in 2010 and 2011, and was released from the club midway through the 2011 season.
