= Jordan Jones (Australian footballer) =

Australian rules footballer (born 1990)

Personal information
- Full name: Jordan Jones
- Born: 29 June 1990 (age 36)
- Original team: Ocean Grove Football Club
- Draft: No. 52, 2008
- Height: 189 cm (6 ft 2 in)
- Weight: 86 kg (190 lb)
- Position: Centre half-back

Playing career^{1}
Years	Club	Games (Goals)
2010	West Coast	2 (0)
- ^{1} Playing statistics correct to the end of 2011.

Career highlights
- WAFL Premiership Player (2013)

Jordan Jones (born 29 June 1990) is an Australian rules footballer previously listed with the Williamstown Football Club in the Victorian Football League (VFL) for season 2017-2018 and also previously listed with West Perth Football Club in the West Australian Football League (WAFL) from 2012-2016. He previously played for the West Coast Eagles in the Australian Football League (AFL). Jones was selected at pick 52 in the 2008 AFL draft with West Coast's 4th round selection. He made his debut for the Eagles at the end of the 2010 season, playing two games, before being de-listed at the end of the 2011 season.

== Junior football ==
Jones moved from his home in Melbourne to Ocean Grove in 2000. Jones played his junior football for the Ocean Grove/Collendina Cobras and Ocean Grove Football Club. He played for Ocean Grove's senior side by the time he was 17. Jones proved his worth at a young age by being selected in the Vic Country team for the 2006 AFL Under 16 Championships. He was named in the best in Vic Country's Round 2 loss to Vic Metro.

== Basketball career ==
Jones excelled at both basketball and football, so knew that later in life he would have to make a choice. He played as a point guard, captaining the Vic Country Under 16 national championship-winning side in 2005. It was however after he had a basketball carnival one week and a football carnival two weeks later, where he realised that juggling the two was too hard, and he chose football where he played for the Geelong Falcons.

== Senior football career ==
=== Geelong Falcons career ===
Jones played for the Geelong Falcons in the TAC Cup, the premier U/18s competition in Victoria. He played 10 matches in 2007, and had played 14 matches in 2008 before injuring his shoulder in the latter half of the season.

=== 2008 U/18 National Championships ===
Jones was selected in the Vic Country team for the 2008 AFL Under 18 Championships. He was a consistent performer and played in all 5 matches. He played especially well in one match against Western Australia where he "controlled precedings" across centre half-back. Jones kicked a goal and was named in the best in the final match of the tournament against Tasmania.

=== 2008 Draft selection ===
Jones was selected by West Coast using their fourth round pick, no. 52. There was doubt over whether he would be picked, as he tore his shoulder muscle in a match playing for Vic Country, which destroyed his second half of the season for the Falcons. Falcons regional manager Michael Turner gave him a "60% chance" of being drafted in 2008. Adelaide, Hawthorn and Sydney all showed interest in Jones, however it was West Coast who ended up selecting him.

Jordan was the centre half-back for the Vic Country side and the games I saw him in he was a solid contributor who was very good in one-on-one situations. He provides a lot of rebound and wins the contested footy well in a marking situation. He's not a defender who will just try and nullify an opponent – he is able to win the footy and run off and create.

— Jason McCartney

=== Peel Thunder career ===
Jones wa allocated to play for the Peel Thunder Football Club in the West Australian Football League (WAFL). Jones has played 10 games so far this season, wearing #17. Arguably his best game for the season so far was in Round 12 against East Fremantle, where he collected 23 disposals and 9 marks.

=== West Coast Eagles career ===
Jones made his senior debut for the West Coast Eagles at the end of the 2010 season. He did not play a game for the club in 2011, and was de-listed at the end of the season. He joined the West Perth Football Club in January 2012, signing a two-year contract.

== Statistics ==
=== Geelong Falcons ===
Year	Matches	Kicks	Handballs	Total Disposals	Tackles	Frees For	Frees Against	Hitouts	Marks	Goals	Behinds
2007	10	88	60	148	19	8	9	5	47	1	2
2008	14	121	70	191	26	3	19	16	53	8	9

=== Vic Country ===
Year	Matches	Kicks	Handballs	Total Disposals	Tackles	Hitouts	Marks	Goals
2008	5	26	34	60	8	1	15	1

=== Peel Thunder ===
Year	Matches	Kicks	Handballs	Total Disposals	Tackles	Frees For	Frees Against	Hitouts	Marks	Goals	Behinds
2009	10	75	67	142	0	4	7	2	52	0	1
