= Jamie McNamara =

Australian rules footballer (born 1988)

Personal information
- Born: 6 March 1988 (age 38)
- Original team: East Fremantle Football Club (WAFL)
- Debut: Round 21, 2007, West Coast Eagles vs. St Kilda, at Telstra Dome
- Height: 183 cm (6 ft 0 in)
- Weight: 87 kg (192 lb)

Playing career^{1}
Years	Club	Games (Goals)
2007–2009	West Coast Eagles	19 (4)
- ^{1} Playing statistics correct to the end of 2009.

Jamie McNamara (born 6 March 1988) is an Australian rules footballer who played for the West Coast Eagles in the Australian Football League (AFL).

Jamie Mcnamara attended Applecross Senior High School in Perth, Western Australia and graduated in 2005.

McNamara was recruited from East Fremantle with the 16th pick in the 2006 rookie draft, receiving the number 45 jersey. He changed to the number 12 at the start of the 2008 season.

== Career ==
McNamara made his debut against St Kilda Football Club in round 21, 2007 at Telstra Dome. He picked up 10 disposals in an 8-point win. He was dropped for the next two games but was a late replacement for Beau Waters for the semi-final against Collingwood. McNamara managed 16 disposals in West Coast's 19-point loss in extra time.

McNamara had to wait until Round 4 2008 to get his next opportunity at AFL Football. He was dropped after that game but managed 11 games for the season including the last 7 consecutive matches.

McNamara played his first game for 2009 against Melbourne in Round 7.

In total, McNamara played 19 AFL games, kicking 4 goals and racking up 282 possessions.

== Post AFL career ==
McNamara was de-listed by the Eagles in October 2009. He continued to playing for East Fremantle Football Club in the West Australian Football League competition, before spending 2 years in Melbourne playing for Williamstown Football Club in the Victorian Football League. He returned to play for East Fremantle again in 2014.
