= Beau Waters =

Australian rules footballer

Personal information
- Full name: Beau Waters
- Born: 30 March 1986 (age 40)
- Original team: West Adelaide (SANFL)
- Draft: 11th overall, 2003 National Draft (West Coast)
- Height: 188 cm (6 ft 2 in)
- Weight: 87 kg (192 lb)
- Position: Defender

Playing career^{1}
Years	Club	Games (Goals)
2004–2015	West Coast	120 (25)
- ^{1} Playing statistics correct to the end of 2015.

Career highlights
- Brian March Medal (SFL) 2000; Under-18 All-Australian team 2003; AFL Rising Star nominee 2004; West Coast premiership side 2006; Geoff Christian Medal 2010; All-Australian team 2012; Robert Rose Award (Most Courageous Player) 2012; Jim Stynes Community Leadership Award 2014

Beau Waters (born 30 March 1986) is a former professional Australian rules footballer and vice-captain of the West Coast Eagles in the Australian Football League (AFL). Originally from the Happy Valley Football Club, South Australia, he played for the West Adelaide Football Club in the South Australian National Football League (SANFL) before being recruited to West Coast with the 11th pick overall in the 2003 National Draft. Waters made his senior debut in 2004, and has played a total of 120 games for the club, mainly as a defender, including the 2006 premiership. He was also in the All-Australian team in 2012, on a half-back flank. Waters' career was plagued by injury but he is viewed as a cult hero among West Coast Eagles supporters due to his hard work ethic and “tough as nails” play style. Beau is married to Belle Waters and has two children, Elijah and Levi.

== Early life ==
Waters grew up in Happy Valley, South Australia, playing for the Happy Valley Football Club in the Southern Football League. He was a member of the 2002 AIS/AFL program intake. He made his senior debut in the SANFL for West Adelaide at the age of 17 in 2003, and was also named in the 2003 Under-18 All-Australian team.

== AFL career ==
Waters was recruited as the Eagles' first-round draft pick in the 2003 National Draft with pick 11. Eagles recruiting manager Trevor Woodhouse described him as ready to immediately step into the Eagles' team: "Beau Waters, we rate him pretty high, he's a skilled left-footer. We're looking for him to step into the fore reasonably quickly, but there's no pressure on him to play next year."

He made his debut for the Eagles against Essendon at the Telstra Dome in Round 3 of the 2004 AFL season, gathering ten possessions and four marks in a game the Eagles lost by six points. He played nine more games in his debut season, gathering 25 possessions and eight marks as the youngest player in an Eagles win against the Western Bulldogs in Round 18.

Waters did not play a game in the 2005 season after being ruled out with osteitis pubis. A week after he had recovered from the injury, he was hit by a taxi he was trying to flag down after a night out in Subiaco. Rushed to Sir Charles Gairdner Hospital, it was initially thought no damage had been done, but it was later revealed he had injured his lateral ligament, ruling him out for six weeks during the pre-season.

Waters returned to the side in 2006 as a key part of the squad, playing 23 matches throughout the season. He scored his first AFL goal in Round 3 against Richmond. He gained his first Brownlow votes in Round 18 against St Kilda for a 34-possession game. Waters played in every one of the Eagles' finals matches. He gathered 26 possessions and took ten marks as the youngest member of the Eagles' premiership side in the Grand Final win over Sydney, in the process gaining a vote in the 2006 Norm Smith Medal.

Waters played 20 games in 2007 and eight games in 2008 before suffering a season-ending elbow injury. He resumed full-training in May of 2009 but then re-injured the same elbow, ruling him out for the remainder of the 2009 season. Waters was awarded the Chris Mainwaring Award for Best Clubman in 2009 for his work for the club while off injured.

Waters made a long-awaited return in the 2010 season, after one-and-a-half years out due to injury. He was one of the Eagles best players in a year where the club finished last, averaging 21 possessions and seven marks in a 20-game season. Waters also captained the club for a number of games after regular captain Darren Glass was ruled out for the season with a knee injury. Waters gathered two Brownlow votes for a 33-possession game in a loss against Geelong in Round 11, and finished third overall in the West Coast Eagles Best & Fairest.

Waters was named the Eagles sole vice-captain for the 2011 AFL season.

He retired in February 2015 due to ongoing injury.

On 19 October 2020 he was awarded life membership of the West Coast Eagles

== Community work ==
In 2014, Waters won the Jim Stynes Community Leadership Award for his work for the Cancer Council Western Australia.

== Statistics ==
Legend
G	Goals	K	Kicks	D	Disposals	T	Tackles
B	Behinds	H	Handballs	M	Marks

Season	Team	No.	Games	Totals							Averages (per game)						
Season	Team	No.	Games	G	B	K	H	D	M	T	G	B	K	H	D	M	T
2004	West Coast	22	10	0	3	81	57	138	46	17	0.0	0.3	8.1	5.7	13.8	4.6	1.7
2005	West Coast	8	0	—	—	—	—	—	—	—	—	—	—	—	—	—	—
2006	West Coast	8	23	8	8	213	177	390	120	58	0.3	0.3	9.3	7.7	17.0	5.2	2.5
2007	West Coast	8	20	1	0	207	206	413	131	50	0.1	0.0	10.4	10.3	20.7	6.6	2.5
2008	West Coast	8	8	4	1	86	44	130	36	24	0.5	0.1	10.8	5.5	16.3	4.5	3.0
2009	West Coast	8	0	—	—	—	—	—	—	—	—	—	—	—	—	—	—
2010	West Coast	8	21	4	5	259	182	441	146	69	0.2	0.2	12.3	8.7	21.0	7.0	3.3
2011	West Coast	8	11	0	0	129	69	198	53	34	0.0	0.0	11.7	6.3	18.0	4.8	3.1
2012	West Coast	8	20	8	4	279	143	422	146	48	0.4	0.2	14.0	7.2	21.1	7.3	2.4
2013	West Coast	8	7	0	0	104	39	143	50	19	0.0	0.0	14.9	5.6	20.4	7.1	2.7
2014	West Coast	8	0	—	—	—	—	—	—	—	—	—	—	—	—	—	—
2015	West Coast	8	0	—	—	—	—	—	—	—	—	—	—	—	—	—	—
Career			120	25	21	1358	917	2275	728	319	0.2	0.2	11.3	7.6	19.0	6.1	2.7
