= Callum Wilson (Australian footballer) =

Australian rules footballer (born 1988)

Personal information
- Full name: Callum Wilson
- Born: 9 June 1988 (age 38)
- Original team: South Fremantle (WAFL)
- Draft: No. 55, 2008 Rookie Draft, West Coast; No. 84 (RP), 2010 National Draft, West Coast
- Height: 191 cm (6 ft 3 in)
- Weight: 94 kg (207 lb)
- Position: Forward / Defender

Playing career^{1}
Years	Club	Games (Goals)
2009–2011	West Coast	7 (13)
- ^{1} Playing statistics correct to the end of 2011.

Callum Wilson (born 9 June 1988) is a former Australian rules footballer, who played with the West Coast Eagles in the Australian Football League (AFL), South Fremantle in the West Australian Football League (WAFL) and Port Adelaide Magpies in the South Australian National Football League (SANFL).

He was recruited by the West Coast Eagles with Pick 55 in the 2008 AFL Rookie Draft and impressed with his strong overhead marking and ability to play in key positions. He made his debut for the Eagles against Essendon in 2009, scoring two goals on debut. He played three more games for them that year. In the early part of 2010 he was unavailable for selection due to injury but bounced back through good form for South Fremantle in the WAFL to play the last three games of the season for the Eagles, including scoring seven goals in the last two games of the season. At the end of the 2010 season Wilson was rewarded with an upgrade to the senior list. Wilson was unable to regain his spot in the 2011 season, behind Josh Kennedy, Quinten Lynch and Jack Darling as the Eagles' tall forwards. He was de-listed at the end of the 2011 season.

After playing one season for Port Adelaide in the SANFL, Wilson played a season for Goolwa-Port Elliot in the Great Southern Football League before attempting a career in American Football (Gridiron).
