= Adam Cockie =

Australian rules footballer (born 1989)

Personal information
- Full name: Adam Ian Leslie Cockie
- Born: 18 April 1989 (age 37)
- Original team: Subiaco
- Debut: 2 May 2009, West Coast vs. Fremantle, at Subiaco Oval
- Height: 182 cm (6 ft 0 in)
- Weight: 85 kg (187 lb)

Playing career^{1}
Years	Club	Games (Goals)
2009–2010	West Coast Eagles	7 (3)
- ^{1} Playing statistics correct to the end of 2010.

Adam Ian Leslie Cockie (born 18 April 1989) is a former professional Australian rules footballer. He played with the West Coast Eagles in the Australian Football League (AFL) from 2009 to 2010.

== Football career ==
Cockie made his senior football debut for Subiaco in the West Australian Football League (WAFL) in the opening round of the 2008 season and went on to play in every game, including their third successive grand final victory. That year, he also represented Western Australia against Queensland in Townsville.

Cockie was drafted by the West Coast Eagles with the 18th pick (second round) in the 2009 AFL Rookie draft, and was soon elevated from the rookie list to make his debut against Fremantle in Round 6, 2009. He played four games before being demoted back to the rookie list to make way for the return of Luke Shuey from injury. He was de-listed by West Coast at the end of the 2010 season.

Cockie spent the 2011 season playing for his former team, Subiaco, in the WAFL, before moving to Victoria to play for Victorian Football League (VFL) side, Sandringham in 2012.

After four seasons in the VFL, Cockie re-joined Subiaco for the 2016 season.

== Other activities ==
Cockie has worked as a diversity community officer with the West Australian Football Commission (WAFC) and as Aboriginal project officer with the Western Australian Cricket Association (WACA).
