= Tom Swift (footballer) =

Australian rules footballer

Personal information
- Full name: Thomas David Swift
- Born: 6 July 1990 (age 36)
- Original team: Swanbourne JFC/Claremont Tigers
- Draft: 20th overall, 2008 National Draft (West Coast)
- Height: 189 cm (6 ft 2 in)
- Weight: 85 kg (187 lb)
- Position: Midfield

Playing career^{1}
Years	Club	Games (Goals)
2009–2012	West Coast	34 (8)
- ^{1} Playing statistics correct to the end of 2012.

Career highlights
- Western Australia Under-16 team 2006; AIS-AFL Academy 2007; Western Australia Under-18 team 2008; Claremont premiership side 2011 and 2012.

Thomas David Swift (born 6 July 1990) is a former Australian rules footballer listed with the West Coast Eagles in the Australian Football League (AFL). Educated at Christ Church Grammar School, he originally played for the Claremont Football Club in the West Australian Football League (WAFL), and was recruited by West Coast with the 20th pick overall at the 2008 National Draft. He made his debut for the club in the 2009 season.

Swift now works as an Investment Banker at Citi.

== Early life ==
Swift attended Christ Church Grammar School between 1996 and 2007 where he was the captain of the 1st XXII in 2006 and finished in the top 40 for the Beazley Medal.

He was heralded as an elite young footballing talent at the 2006 NAB AFL Under 16 Championship where he played 3 games for Western Australia averaging 36.3 disposals per game, the highest of any player at any under-16 or under-18 carnival since 2001. He also averaged 8.7 marks, 5.0 inside 50s, 6.7 clearances and 5.3 tackles per game for the championships and earned a place in the 2006 AIS-AFL Academy intake.

In 2007, he ruptured his ACL during a 2007 AIS trial game vs Subiaco at Subiaco Oval, after a routine change of direction, which saw him miss the rest of the football season.

In 2008, he was selected in Western Australia's NAB AFL Under 18 Championships squad, but a grade 2 lateral ligament tear as a result of hyperextension, after landing poorly from a leap during one of Under 18 trial games caused him to miss both the Championship series and the rest of the season.

Despite his injury woes, he still received an invite to the 2008 AFL draft Camp and after a strong performance where he finished 3rd in the standing vertical leap (72 cm), 5th in the 20m sprint (2.89s) and equal 9th in the beep test (14.1), he was selected at pick 20 in the ensuing Draft by the West Coast Eagles.

== Football career ==
=== 2009 season ===
Swift performed well in the WAFL for Claremont in first half of 2009 and was named to make his debut for West Coast against Carlton in Round 10. He has since played ten games at AFL level and experienced his first win against Essendon in round 18, when he also kicked his first two goals. In the Eagles' round 22 win over Richmond at Subiaco Oval Swift received 3 Brownlow Medal votes for a best on ground performance, the first Brownlow votes of his career.

=== 2010 season ===
Swift played the opening 3 games of the 2010 AFL season, before being omitted from the side. He returned to the side for the Western Derby in round 6 and played the next 5 games, before being a late omission from the round 12 game against Richmond. He returned to the team in round 14 against Collingwood, but missed the next week with abdominal soreness and he only managed a further 3 AFL games for the year from round 18–20 before being omitted and playing the rest of the season with Claremont in the WAFL.

=== 2011 season ===
Swift started the season with Claremont Football Club in the WAFL and didn't get his first AFL opportunity till round 11 against Gold Coast. He was omitted for the next game, but returned in round 13 against Port Adelaide and played the next 2 games against Carlton and Geelong before being omitted again.

=== 2012 season ===
Swift played six games, starting as a substitute in all but two games. He impressed as substitute on a few occasions but was unable to string together consecutive games in the starting 22. He completed his season winning a WAFL premiership with the Claremont Football Club. On Friday 5 October, Swift remarkably announced his retirement from AFL football at the age of 22 in order to study medicine at university. It was understood that he had been offered a one-year contract from the West Coast Eagles but declined, instead announcing his retirement to pursue his studies in medicine.

=== 2013 season ===
Due to no appearances in the WAFL, and an article in the Sunday Times stating Swift's enjoyment for life at the University of Western Australia, it was presumed that Swift's football career was officially over. However, in the morning of 18 June, an article in the West Australian confirmed that Claremont had requested that Tom play in Claremont's first match of the Foxtel Cup as a result of their extensive injury list. Swift accepted and partook in a 58-point demolition of Southport. He had 17 disposals and kicked one goal. Swift gave no clear indication of whether or not he will continue playing in matches to come.
