= Jarrad Oakley-Nicholls =

Australian rules footballer, born 1988

Personal information
- Full name: Jarrad Oakley-Nicholls
- Born: 9 February 1988 (age 38); Western Australia
- Original team: East Perth (WAFL)
- Draft: No. 8, 2005 AFL draft No. 16, 2010 AFL rookie draft
- Height: 188 cm (6 ft 2 in)
- Weight: 81 kg (179 lb)
- Position: Half back flank/wing

Playing career^{1}
Years	Club	Games (Goals)
2006–2009	Richmond	13 (1)
2010–2011	West Coast	0 (0)
- ^{1} Playing statistics correct to the end of 2009.

Jarrad Oakley-Nicholls (born 9 February 1988) is a former professional Australian rules footballer who played for the Richmond Football Club and West Coast Eagles in the Australian Football League (AFL). He first made his AFL debut at the annual "Dreamtime at the 'G'" game in 2006.

Oakley-Nicholls was delisted by Richmond at the end of the 2009 season after playing 13 games during his four years at the club. He was rookie listed by West Coast for the 2010 and 2011 seasons, but did not play any games.
