= Koby Stevens =

Australian rules footballer

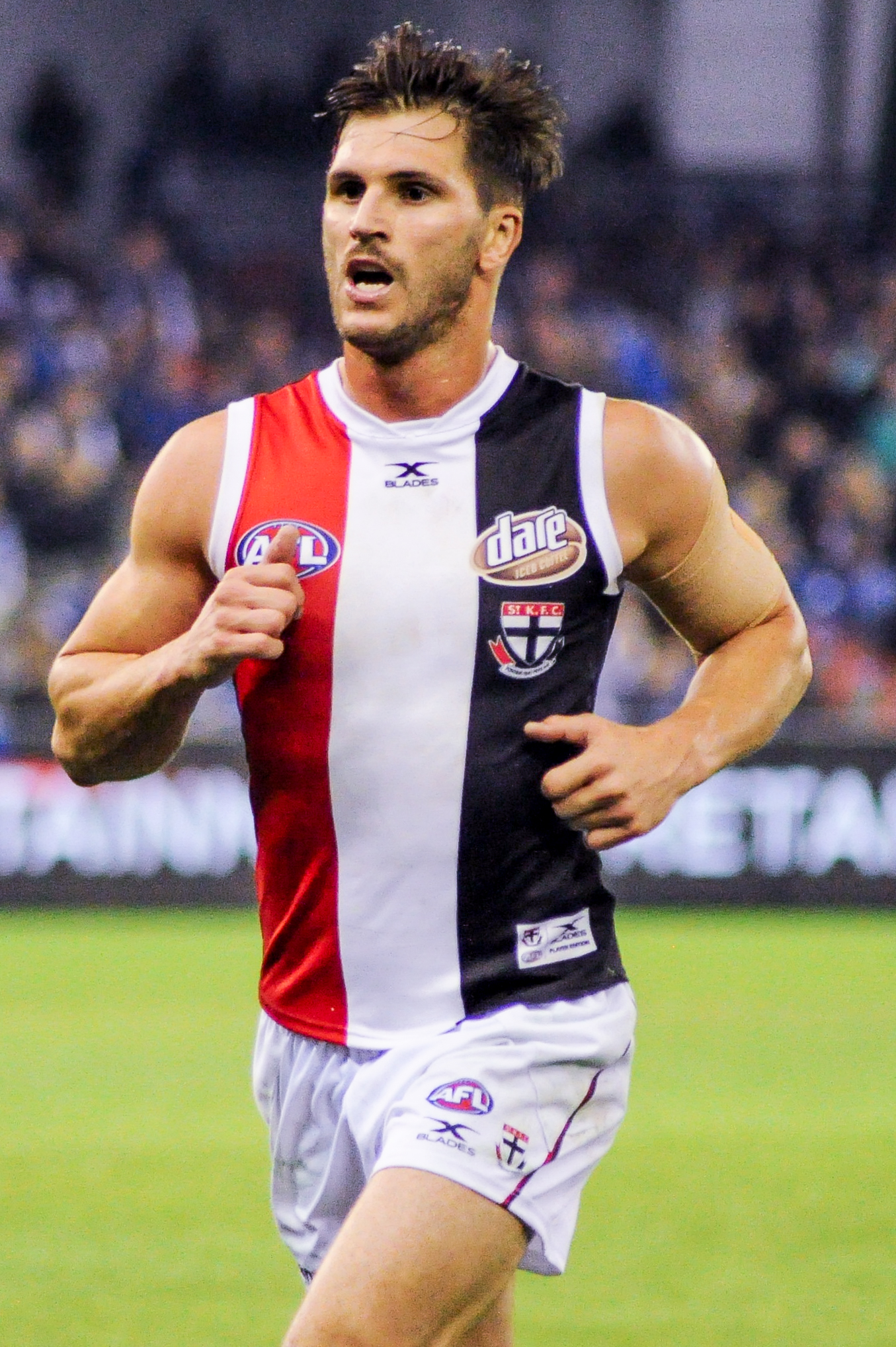
- Stevens playing for St Kilda in June 2017

Personal information
- Full name: Koby Stevens
- Born: 18 June 1991 (age 35)
- Original team: Gippsland Power (TAC Cup)
- Draft: No. 23, 2009 national draft
- Height: 187 cm (6 ft 2 in)
- Weight: 83 kg (183 lb)
- Position: Midfield

Playing career^{1}
Years	Club	Games (Goals)
2010–2012	West Coast	11 (2)
2013–2016	Western Bulldogs	63 (32)
2017–2018	St Kilda	17 (6)
Total		91 (40)
- ^{1} Playing statistics correct to the end of 2018.

Career highlights
- Claremont premiership player: 2012; VFL premiership player: 2016

Koby Stevens (born 18 June 1991) is a former professional Australian rules footballer who played for the West Coast, Western Bulldogs, and St Kilda Football Club in the Australian Football League (AFL). He was selected as a second round pick (number 22 overall) in the 2009 AFL draft.

== Biography ==
Stevens played for Gippsland Power in the TAC Cup.

In 2008 he represented Vic Country at the 2008 AFL Under 18 Championships, was named in the TAC Cup team of the year on the wing and also selected in the AIS/AFL Academy.

In 2009, he captained the AIS/AFL Academy squad in their annual tour and was in the leadership group for Vic Country at the 2009 AFL Under 18 Championships. Stevens was also invited to and attended the annual AFL Draft Camp at the Australian Institute of Sport in Canberra in October 2009 but did not participate in much of the testing as he was undergoing rehabilitation from osteitis pubis sustained mid-season.

Stevens requested a trade to the Western Bulldogs after the Eagles' 2012 season ended, wishing to return to his home state of Victoria and rejoin former Gippsland Power teammate and friend Clay Smith. On 24 October 2012, it was announced that Stevens had been traded to the Western Bulldogs in exchange for the Bulldogs' pick 44 in the 2012 AFL draft.

At the conclusion of the 2016 season, he was traded to St Kilda.

== Playing style ==
Stevens played primarily as a midfielder, but also had the versatility to play off a half forward flank. He had a strong, athletic build and his contested ball winning skills, attack on the ball, overhead marking, consistency, work-rate and leadership skills were all described as strengths of his.

== Retirement ==
On Monday 23 July 2018, Koby Stevens announced his retirement from football, with the 27-year-old unable to overcome his persistent concussion.
