= Ashley Smith (Australian footballer) =

Australian rules footballer (born 1990)

Personal information
- Full name: Ashley Smith
- Born: 20 July 1990 (age 36)
- Original team: Dandenong Stingrays (TAC Cup)
- Draft: 36th pick, 2008 National Draft
- Height: 186 cm (6 ft 1 in)
- Weight: 85 kg (187 lb)
- Positions: Midfielder, defender

Playing career^{1}
| Years | Club | Games (Goals) |
| 2009–2013 | Perth (WAFL) | 45 (16) |
| 2009–2014 | West Coast | 45 (10) |
| 2014 | East Perth (WAFL) | 17 (17) |
- ^{1} Playing statistics correct to the end of 2014.

Ashley Smith (born 20 July 1990) is an Australian rules footballer who previously played for the West Coast Eagles in the Australian Football League (AFL). Making his debut for the club during the 2010 season, he played 45 games as a midfielder and running defender before being delisted at the end of the 2014 season. From Victoria, Smith was recruited from the Dandenong Stingrays in the TAC Cup, and has also played at WAFL level for both Perth and East Perth.

== Football career ==
Smith was accepted into the AIS-AFL Academy before playing for Vic Metro in the AFL Under 18 Championships. He then represented the Dandenong Stingrays in the TAC Cup, missing most of the first part of the season before starring in the second half, including the preliminary final. At the 2008 AFL Draft Camp, Smith impressed talent scouts with his speed and long-kicking abilities, placing first in the 20 metre sprint, sixth in the 30 metre repeat sprints, and tenth in the standing vertical jump, and consistently kicking over 50 metres. Smith was selected by West Coast with Pick 36 in the 2008 AFL draft, after being predicted to go as high as the first round. He made his debut for West Coast in round 15 of the 2010 season against Adelaide at Subiaco Oval, gaining 19 disposals and four marks off the half-back flank, and scoring a goal from 55 metres out.

Smith was delisted by West Coast at the end of the 2014 season. He had played at AFL level only twice during the season.
