= Matt Rosa =

Australian rules footballer

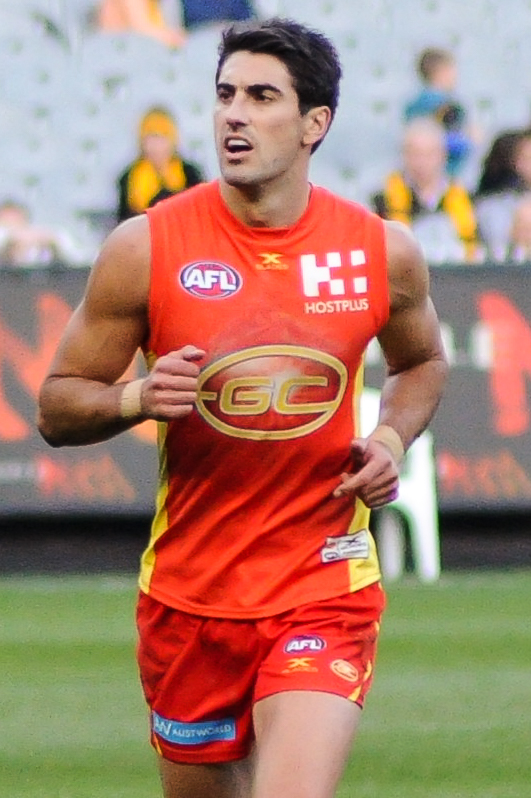
- Rosa playing for Gold Coast in June 2017

Personal information
- Full name: Matthew Nicolas Rosa
- Born: 23 November 1986 (age 39)
- Original team: North Ballarat Rebels (TAC Cup)/Warrack Eagles
- Draft: 29th pick, 2004 National Draft (West Coast)
- Height: 191 cm (6 ft 3 in)
- Weight: 84 kg (185 lb)
- Position: Midfielder

Playing career^{1}
Years	Club	Games (Goals)
2005–2015	West Coast	168 (39)
2016–2018	Gold Coast	39 (6)
Total		207 (45)
- ^{1} Playing statistics correct to the end of 2018.

Career highlights
- Ross Glendinning Medal: 2012; AFL Rising Star nominee: 2006

Matthew Nicolas Rosa (born 23 November 1986) is a former Australian rules footballer who played for the Gold Coast Football Club in the Australian Football League (AFL). Originally from Warracknabeal and later boarding school in Ballarat, Rosa played under-18 football for the North Ballarat Rebels in the TAC Cup before being drafted by the West Coast Eagles in the 2004 National Draft. He made his debut for the club in 2005 and was nominated for the AFL Rising Star the following season in 2006. He played 168 games for West Coast but at the end of the 2015 season, requested a trade to the Gold Coast Suns. Having played 207 games, Rosa hung up the boots at the end of the 2018 season. In October 2018 he joined the West Coast Eagles coaching panel which he left at 2020 season's end. As of 2024, Rosa is the list manager of Essendon Football Club.

== Career ==
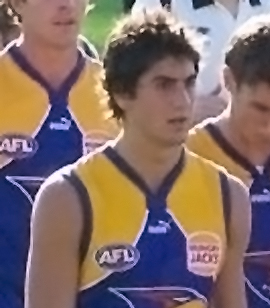

Rosa was recruited with the number 29 draft pick in the 2004 AFL draft, hailing from the North Ballarat Rebels. He made his debut for the West Coast Eagles in Round 17, 2005 against the Sydney Swans. He was selected for first two weeks of the 2006 finals, but was dropped for the last two weeks of finals, being named as an emergency for the 2006 AFL Grand Final, which the Eagles won.

The 2007 season brought new opportunities for Rosa, who played 22 games for the home and away season and was selected in the squad to play in both the two games in the finals series. He suffered from shin splints in 2008, restricting him to just 8 games for the season. He returned in 2009 to play all 22 games.

Rosa played his 150th game in 2014 and re-signed with the club for two more years, however, in October 2015, Rosa was traded to the Gold Coast Suns.

In August 2018, Rosa announced his retirement from AFL football after 13 years and 207 games.

After retiring from football Rosa joined the coaching staff at the West Coast Eagles for two seasons, after which he took on the role of Football Operations Manager at Peel Thunder, the WAFL representative side of the Fremantle Dockers. In 2023 Rosa joined the Essendon Football Club as its Talent and Operations Manager, the following year Rosa would take over from his long serving predecessor Adrian Dodoro as Essendon's List Manager.
