= Tony Notte =

Australian rules footballer

Personal information
- Full name: Tony Notte
- Born: 15 April 1990 (age 36)
- Original team: Upper Swan JFC
- Height: 194 cm (6 ft 4 in)
- Weight: 90 kg (198 lb)
- Position: Forward/Ruck

Club information
- Current club: Swan Districts
- Number: 28

Playing career^{1}
Years	Club	Games (Goals)
2008–2025	Swan Districts	323 (192)
2008	West Coast	2 (0)
Total		325 (192)
- ^{1} Playing statistics correct to the end of 2024.

Career highlights
- WAFL Premiership Player: 2010; AIS-AFL Academy 2007; Western Australia Under-18 team 2007; Swan Districts best and fairest (2013, 2015, 2018)

Tony Notte (born 15 April 1990) is an Australian rules footballer currently listed with the Swan Districts Football Club in the West Australian Football League (WAFL). He previously played two matches for the West Coast Eagles in the Australian Football League (AFL).

== Career ==
Born in Perth, Western Australia, Notte played junior football for the Upper Swan Junior Football Club, and attended Governor Stirling Senior High School in Woodbridge. He represented Western Australia at the 2007 AFL Under 18 Championships, and was part of the Australian Institute of Sport's AFL Academy intake in 2007. Notte also played colts (under-18) matches for the Swan Districts Football Club in the WAFL. Notte was drafted by West Coast with the 20th pick overall in the 2007 National Draft, held in November 2007. He made his AFL debut in Round 20, 2008 against the Melbourne Football Club. Notte was de-listed at the end of the 2010 season.

On 28 June 2025, Notte played his 323rd and final WAFL game for Swan Districts, finishing as the club's games record holder.
