= Andrew Strijk =

Australian rules footballer

Personal information
- Full name: Andrew Peter Strijk
- Born: 18 October 1987 (age 39); Perth, Western Australia
- Original team: Carine JFC
- Draft: 27th pick, 2010 Rookie Draft; 93rd pick (RP), 2010 National Draft
- Height: 183 cm (6 ft 0 in)
- Weight: 84 kg (185 lb)
- Position: Utility

Club information
- Current club: West Perth
- Number: 3

Playing career^{1}
Years	Club	Games (Goals)
2006–2019	West Perth	242 (292)
2010–2012	West Coast	13 (11)
Total		238 (265)

Representative team honours
Years	Team	Games (Goals)
2009–2010	Western Australia	2 (0)
- ^{1} Playing statistics correct to the end of 2019.

Career highlights
- Premiership with West Perth 2013; West Perth Best & Fairest 2013; Bernie Naylor Medalist: 2018

Andrew Peter Strijk (born 18 October 1987) is an Australian rules footballer currently listed with the West Perth Football Club in the West Australian Football League (WAFL). He previously played with the West Coast Eagles in the Australian Football League (AFL).

== Career ==
Strijk was recruited from the Carine Junior Football Club, and made his debut at the age of 18 for West Perth midway through the 2006 WAFL season, against East Perth. He played 11 games in his debut season, scoring 12 goals. One of West Perth's most consistently selected players, he played state football for Western Australia in 2009 and 2010, whilst also working part-time as a refrigeration mechanic.

Strijk impressed West Coast recruiting staff with his clean kicking skills in the midfield and off the half-back line, marking skills and his ability to score goals, and was selected by them with Pick 27 in the 2010 AFL Rookie Draft. He missed most of the preseason through injury but again due to his consistent performances at West Perth, was elevated off the rookie list to make his debut in Round 13 against the Western Bulldogs. He performed well, scoring two goals on debut and playing the next five games mainly off the half-forward and half-back flanks, scoring five more goals. In total, he played 13 games for the club between 2010 and 2012, kicking 11 goals. At the end of the 2012 season he was told that his contract with the Eagles would not be renewed for 2013.

In 2018 Strijk won the Bernie Naylor Medal as the leading goalkicker in the WAFL, shared with his Falcons teammate Tyler Keitel.
