= Josh Kennedy (footballer, born 1987) =

Australian rules footballer, born 1987

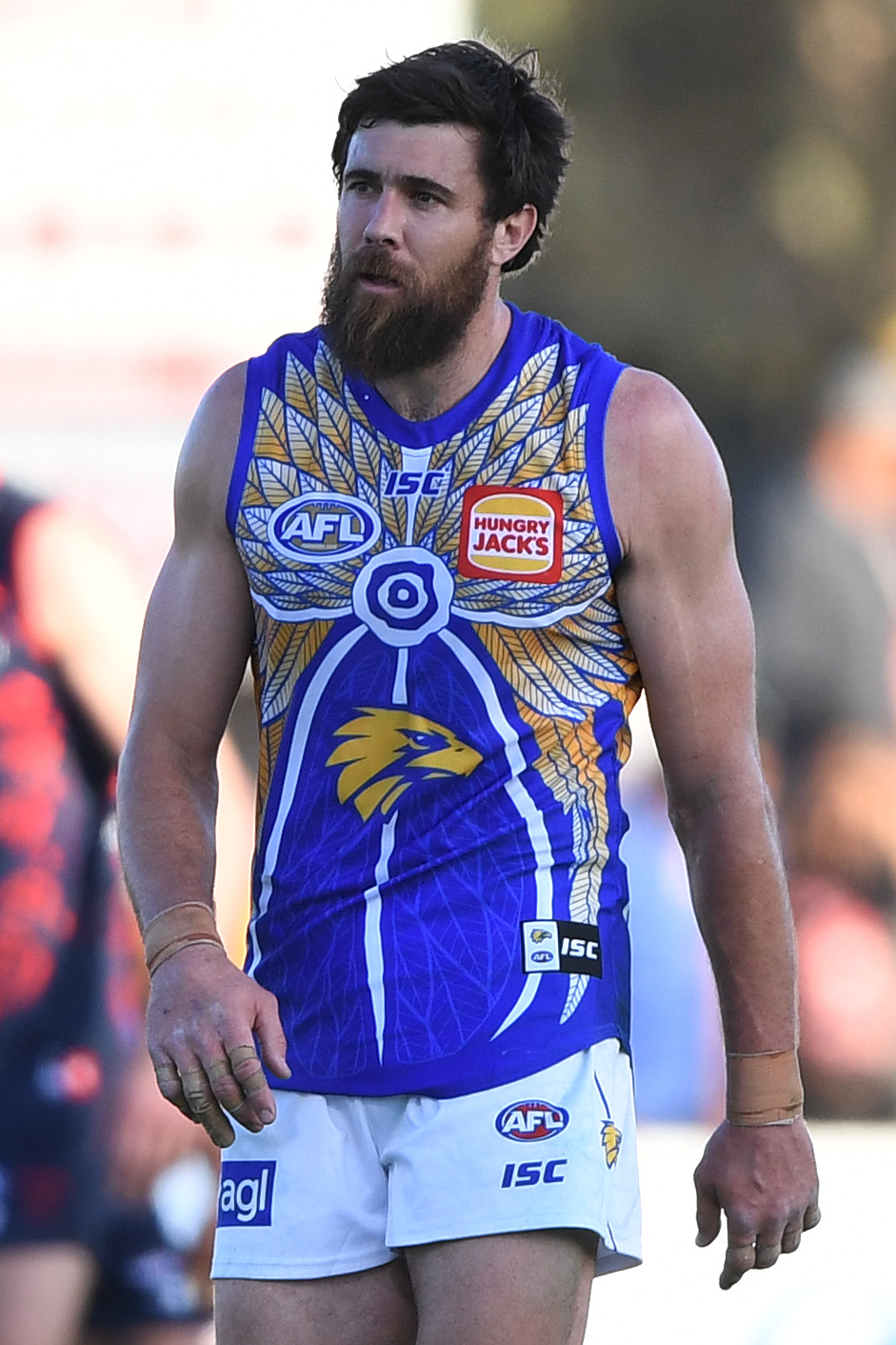
- Kennedy playing for West Coast in 2019

Personal information
- Full name: Joshua James Kennedy
- Nickname: JK
- Born: 25 August 1987 (age 39); Melbourne, Victoria
- Original team: Northampton (GNFL)/East Fremantle (WAFL)
- Draft: No. 4, 2005 National Draft
- Height: 196 cm (6 ft 5 in)
- Weight: 99 kg (218 lb)
- Position: Forward

Playing career^{1}
Years	Club	Games (Goals)
2006–2007	Carlton	22 (11)
2008–2022	West Coast	271 (712)
Total		293 (723)
- ^{1} Playing statistics correct to the end of the 2022 season.

Career highlights
- AFL premiership player: 2018; 8× West Coast leading goalkicker: 2011, 2013, 2014, 2015, 2016, 2017, 2020, 2022; 2× Coleman Medal: 2015, 2016; 3× All-Australian: 2015 (vc), 2016, 2017 (vc); 3× Glendinning–Allan Medal: 2016, 2017, 2020; West Coast all-time leading goalkicker

Joshua James Kennedy (born 25 August 1987) is a former Australian rules footballer who played for the West Coast Eagles in the Australian Football League (AFL). He previously played for Carlton from 2006 to 2007 and is regarded as one of the best key-forwards of his generation.

Kennedy is originally from Melbourne but grew up in Northampton, Western Australia. He played football for East Fremantle in the West Australian Football League (WAFL) before being drafted to Carlton with the fourth pick in the 2005 National Draft. After two seasons at Carlton, he was traded to West Coast at the end of the 2007 season as part of a deal involving club captain Chris Judd. Kennedy soon established himself as West Coast's leading key forward. He has led the club goalkicking six times, first in 2011 and then in five consecutive seasons from 2013 onwards. In 2014, he briefly served as acting co-captain following the retirement of Darren Glass. Kennedy won consecutive Coleman Medals in 2015 and 2016 as the league's leading goalkicker, and was runner-up in 2017. He was also named in the All-Australian team in each of those years. In 2022, Kennedy kicked his 700th goal, becoming the first Eagles player to reach the milestone.

== Early life and junior career ==
Kennedy was born in Melbourne, and grew up in Canberra, Townsville, and Perth, with his family finally settling in Northampton, a small country town north of Geraldton, Western Australia. His parents, Jenny Peterson and Jamie Kennedy, both played basketball professionally in the Women's National Basketball League and National Basketball League, respectively, having first met as scholarship holders at the Australian Institute of Sport (AIS). Kennedy played both football and basketball growing up, and he represented Western Australia's state under-16 basketball team. He later concentrated on football, playing for Northampton in the Great Northern Football League (GNFL). Kennedy played for the state football team at both under-16 and under-18 level, and he was named in the under-18 All-Australian team at the conclusion of the 2005 AFL Under-18 Championships. He had attended the AIS/AFL Academy in Canberra the previous year, and toured Ireland with an academy side, playing several international rules matches, and thus became the first child of two previous AIS scholarship holders to also attend the institute. With Northampton falling into the recruitment zone of the Perth-based East Fremantle Football Club, Kennedy made his senior (WAFL) debut during the 2005 season, finishing with six goals from six games. He was selected by Carlton with pick four in the 2005 National Draft, held in November 2005.

== Senior career ==
In 2006, Kennedy showed promises that he could be a future key-position forward, having made his debut in Round 6. However, he struggled for ground time and form when playing at AFL level, scoring only 5.4 from his nine games. In Carlton's VFL-affiliate, the Northern Bullants, he found it easier to show his skills with eighteen goals for the season.

In 2007, Kennedy committed to a new two-year contract with the Carlton Football Club. However, on 11 October, it was announced that he had agreed to instead return to his native state and play for the West Coast Eagles, thus enabling Carlton to secure the services of top midfielder Chris Judd in a trade.

On 26 April 2008, Kennedy, wearing number 17, made his debut for the Eagles.

In Round 9, 2011, Kennedy kicked ten goals against the Western Bulldogs, becoming just the fourth Eagle (after Scott Cummings, Peter Sumich and Mark LeCras) to kick ten goals in a game.

After playing in struggling teams at the start of his career—four of Kennedy's first six seasons resulted in bottom two finishes, including two wooden spoons, one each at Carlton and West Coast, respectively—Kennedy made his first finals appearance in 2011. Kennedy won only 14 of the first 67 matches of his career. However his record has since improved; as of the end of 2012, he has won 23 of his last 32 matches to have a career win-draw-loss record of 37–1–61.

In the 2013 AFL season, Kennedy was in front of the Coleman Medal nearly every week. But with the Eagles losing their last three games by an average margin of 71 points and Kennedy being goalless in each of them, he lost his chance of winning the medal.

On 30 March 2014, Kennedy played his 100th game for the Eagles, kicking four goals and one behind in a 93-point thrashing of Melbourne at the MCG. In Round 8, 2014, Kennedy bagged 11 goals straight in a 111-point win over the Giants. He would then go on to kick bags of 7 and 8 both against the Suns. He finished the year with 61 goals. After Darren Glass retired midway through the season, Kennedy was named acting co-captain of the club for the remainder of 2014, along with four other players.

On 10 April 2015, Kennedy kicked ten goals again against Carlton. It was the third time that he brought up the double figures, kicking 6 of his 10 goals in the third quarter. His tenth goal for the night was also his 300th for his career. At the end of the home-and-away season, Kennedy finished with 75 goals and became the second West Coast player to win the Coleman Medal.

On 21 May 2016, after kicking 5 goals in the previous match, Kennedy bagged seven goals against Port Adelaide to bring his career tally to 400 goals. He went on to secure back-to-back Coleman Medals in the same year, scoring a total of 82 goals.

Kennedy kicked his 500th career goal in Round 20 of the 2017 AFL season. He then kicked his 500th goal for West Coast two weeks later in Round 22, becoming only the second player in club history to do so (after Peter Sumich).

On 29 April 2018, Kennedy became West Coast's all-time leading goalkicker, overtaking Sumich with his 515th goal for the Eagles during the Western Derby. Kennedy scored three goals in West Coast's 2018 premiership win.

In July 2022, Kennedy kicked his 700th goal for West Coast against Carlton, and a month later he announced his retirement from the AFL.

Kennedy decided to make his final game a home game in the Round 21 match against Adelaide on Sunday, 7 August 2022. Despite Adelaide winning by 16 points, Kennedy recorded an 8-goal haul and was chaired off to a standing ovation and a guard of honour by both teams. In a gesture of appreciation, Kennedy personally shook the hands of the entire Adelaide team, including their entire on-field support staff.

== Statistics ==
Statistics are correct to the end of the 2022 season

Legend
G	Goals	K	Kicks	D	Disposals	T	Tackles
B	Behinds	H	Handballs	M	Marks
#	Played in that season's premiership team	†	Led the league for the season

Season	Team	No.	Games	Totals							Averages (per game)							Votes
Season	Team	No.	Games	G	B	K	H	D	M	T	G	B	K	H	D	M	T	Votes
2006	Carlton	5	9	5	4	36	16	52	32	11	0.6	0.4	4.0	1.8	5.8	3.6	1.2	0
2007	Carlton	5	13	6	5	57	40	97	50	27	0.5	0.4	4.4	3.1	7.5	3.8	2.1	0
2008	West Coast	17	7	7	4	55	34	89	46	7	1.0	0.6	7.9	4.9	12.7	6.6	1.0	0
2009	West Coast	17	16	31	17	150	52	202	110	28	1.9	1.1	9.4	3.3	12.6	6.9	1.8	0
2010	West Coast	17	22	41	19	199	61	260	130	60	1.9	0.9	9.0	2.8	11.8	5.9	2.7	3
2011	West Coast	17	23	59	38	208	62	270	144	70	2.6	1.7	9.0	2.7	11.7	6.3	3.0	4
2012	West Coast	17	9	18	14	58	16	74	43	13	2.0	1.6	6.4	1.8	8.2	4.8	1.4	3
2013	West Coast	17	21	60	23	210	63	273	143	69	2.9	1.1	10.0	3.0	13.0	6.8	3.3	6
2014	West Coast	17	20	61	33	175	51	226	114	62	3.1	1.7	8.8	2.6	11.3	5.7	3.1	11
2015	West Coast	17	25	80^{†}	55^{†}	241	92	333	168	52	3.2^{†}	2.2^{†}	9.6	3.7	13.3	6.7	2.1	12
2016	West Coast	17	23	82^{†}	37	229	71	300	148	69	3.6^{†}	1.6	9.9	3.0	12.9	6.4	3.1	17
2017	West Coast	17	19	69	39	166	59	225	111	27	3.6^{†}	2.1	8.7	3.1	11.8	5.8	1.4	13
2018^{#}	West Coast	17	14	43	20	117	38	155	68	28	3.1^{†}	1.4	8.4	2.7	11.1	4.9	2.0	4
2019	West Coast	17	22	49	29	132	51	183	89	39	2.2	1.3	6.0	2.3	8.3	4.0	1.8	3
2020	West Coast	17	17	34	22	96	23	119	69	16	2.0	1.3	5.7	1.4	7.0	4.1	0.9	6
2021	West Coast	17	18	41	21	131	47	178	89	21	2.3	1.2	7.3	2.6	9.9	4.9	1.2	2
2022	West Coast	17	15	37	13	96	37	133	58	21	2.5	0.9	6.4	2.5	8.9	3.9	1.4	6
Career			293	723	393	2356	813	3169	1612	620	2.5	1.3	8.0	2.8	10.8	5.5	2.1	90

== Honours and achievements ==
AFL

- 1× AFL Premiership Player: 2018
- 2× Coleman Medallist: 2015, 2016
- 3× All-Australian: 2015 (vc), 2016, 2017 (vc)
- 2× All-Australian 40-man Squad: 2011, 2013
- Carlton Pre-Season Premiership Side: 2007

West Coast Eagles

- 8× West Coast leading goalkicker: 2011, 2013, 2014, 2015, 2016, 2017, 2020, 2022
- Vice-captain: 2014–2021
- Chris Mainwaring Medallist: 2015
- 3× Glendinning–Allan Medallist: 2016 (round 20), 2017 (round 6), 2020 (round 7)
- Eagles in the Community Award: 2016
- Life Membership: 2016

== Personal life ==
Kennedy married long-time girlfriend Lauren Atkinson, an artist, in October 2016. They had previously been together since 2008 and have two daughters. Kennedy also has two siblings, an older brother Scott and sister Melissa.
