= Darren Glass =

Australian rules footballer (born 1981)

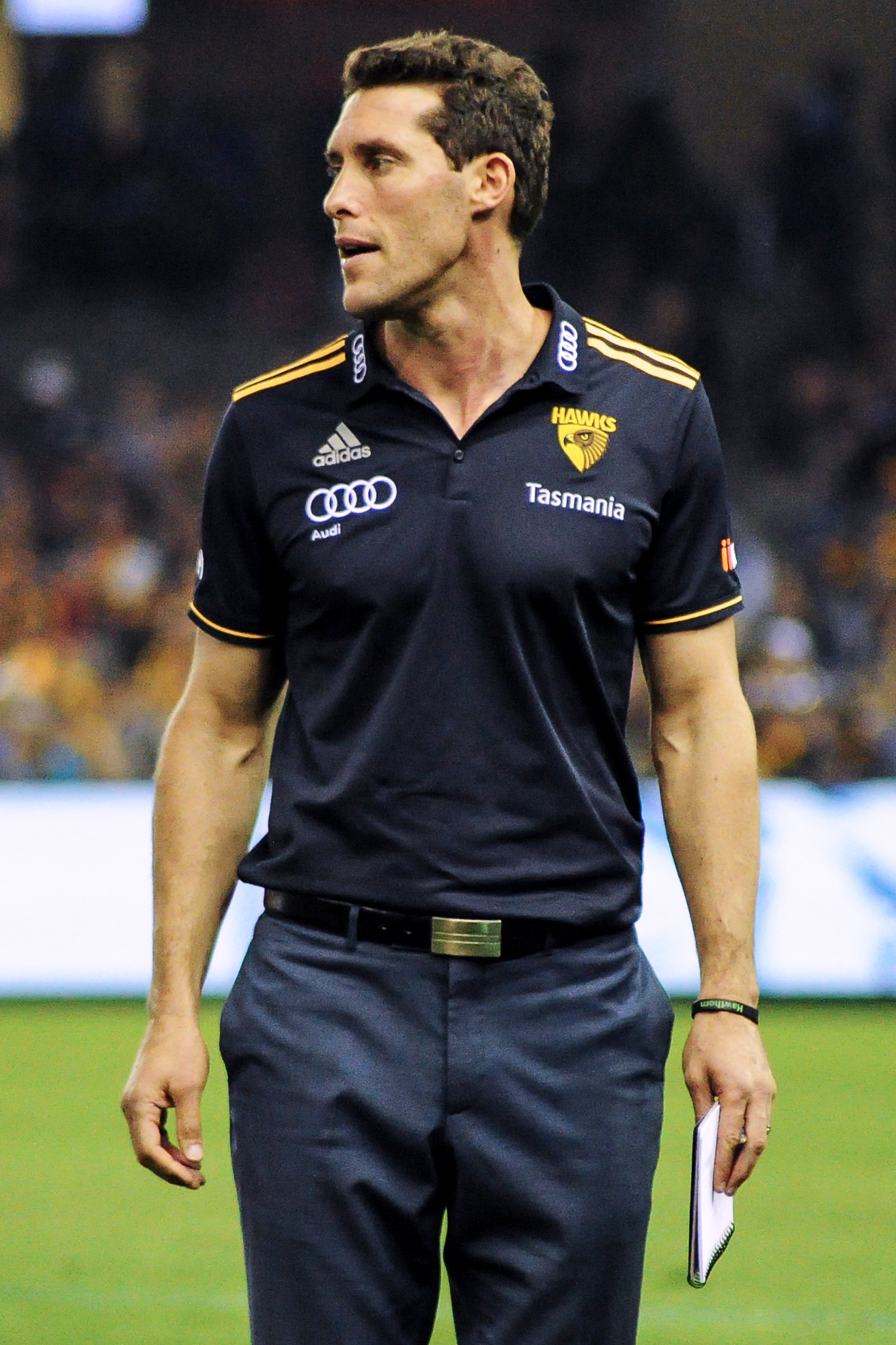
- Glass in April 2018

Personal information
- Full name: Darren Glass
- Born: 14 May 1981 (age 45); Northam, Western Australia
- Original team: Railways (Northam)
- Draft: 11th overall, 1999 National Draft (West Coast)
- Height: 192 cm (6 ft 4 in)
- Weight: 94 kg (207 lb)
- Position: Full-back

Playing career^{1}
Years	Club	Games (Goals)
2000–2014	West Coast	270 (8)
- ^{1} Playing statistics correct to the end of 2014.

Career highlights
- West Coast premiership side 2006; 3× West Coast Club Champion 2007, 2009, 2011; 4× All-Australian team 2006, 2007, 2011, 2012 (captain); West Coast Captain 2008–2014

Darren Glass (born 14 May 1981) is a former Australian rules footballer who played as a full-back for the West Coast Eagles in the Australian Football League (AFL). Originally from Northam, Western Australia, he attended Carine Senior High School before beginning his career with Perth in the West Australian Football League (WAFL). He was later recruited by West Coast with the 11th pick in the 1999 National Draft, making his debut for the club the following season. Glass was named in the All-Australian team on four occasions, including as captain of the 2012 team. He was named captain of West Coast in 2008, after Chris Judd was traded to Carlton, and won club best and fairest awards in 2007, 2009, and 2011. Glass retired from football midway through the 2014 season, having played 270 games for West Coast. Glass is now the General Manager of Complete Home Filtration.

== Career ==
=== Playing ===
He was recruited as the number 11 draft pick in the 1999 AFL draft from Perth and made his debut for the Eagles in Round 4, 2000 against Adelaide.

Glass, who had a relatively low profile in a team of well known stars such as Ben Cousins, Chris Judd, and Daniel Kerr, was named as the All-Australian full-back in 2006.

He had another excellent 2007 season where he won West Coast's Club Champion Award and his second All-Australian selection.

On 9 November 2007, Glass was announced as the new captain of West Coast with the departure of Chris Judd to Victoria. Glass was appointed to lead the recovery of the club after a series of off-field scandals. West Coast had a poor year in his first year of captaincy, suffering from the loss of Judd and Cousins as well as from injuries to key players, including Glass himself.

After a successful season playing all 22 matches in 2009, Glass won his second Club Champion award ahead of fellow defender Shannon Hurn. He followed this up two years later in 2011 where he won his third Club Champion award and third All-Australian selection. In 2012 Glass was given his fourth All-Australian selection and named as the captain of the All-Australian team.

On 12 June 2014, Glass announced his retirement due to injury, effective immediately.

Glass kicked just eight goals in 270 games. Out of over 200 players who have played more than 250 VFL/AFL games, only two (Rod Carter and John Rantall) kicked fewer goals.

=== Coaching ===
At the end of the 2017 AFL season Glass accepted an assistant coaching position at Hawthorn. At the conclusion of the 2019 AFL Season, Glass returned to the West Coast Eagles as the List Manager after Brady Rawlings returned to the North Melbourne Football Club. In October 2019 Darren accepted a position back at West Coast as a player list manager, heavily involved in the recruiting process. Newly appointed captain Luke Shuey has welcomed his return.

=== Business ===
Glass is now the General Manager at Complete Home Filtration, has a Master of Business Administration from UWA and spent 2 years at The Boston Consulting Group.

== Personal ==
Glass married Alicia Severin in December 2007. They have two daughters and one son. Glass has a commerce degree in finance and marketing from Curtin University. He completed a Master of Business Administration degree at the University of Western Australia in 2015 has previously worked as a consultant for Boston Consulting Group.

Darren's nephew is current West Coast player Deven Robertson.

== Statistics ==
Legend
G	Goals	K	Kicks	D	Disposals	T	Tackles
B	Behinds	H	Handballs	M	Marks

Season	Team	No.	Games	Totals							Averages (per game)						
Season	Team	No.	Games	G	B	K	H	D	M	T	G	B	K	H	D	M	T
2000	West Coast	23	14	1	1	38	50	88	25	13	0.1	0.1	2.7	3.6	6.3	1.8	0.9
2001	West Coast	23	12	0	0	42	61	103	31	23	0.0	0.0	3.5	5.1	8.6	2.6	1.9
2002	West Coast	23	12	0	0	35	55	90	24	17	0.0	0.0	2.9	4.6	7.5	2.0	1.4
2003	West Coast	23	15	1	0	51	91	142	38	24	0.1	0.0	3.4	6.1	9.5	2.5	1.6
2004	West Coast	23	18	2	0	62	95	157	56	32	0.1	0.0	3.4	5.3	8.7	3.1	1.8
2005	West Coast	23	25	2	0	135	124	259	90	42	0.1	0.0	5.4	5.0	10.4	3.6	1.7
2006	West Coast	23	25	1	0	102	171	273	98	44	0.0	0.0	4.1	6.8	10.9	3.9	1.7
2007	West Coast	23	24	1	2	96	178	274	82	32	0.0	0.1	4.0	7.4	11.4	3.4	1.3
2008	West Coast	23	21	0	0	74	174	248	67	28	0.0	0.0	3.5	8.3	11.8	3.2	1.3
2009	West Coast	23	22	0	0	61	206	267	78	38	0.0	0.0	2.8	9.4	12.1	3.5	1.7
2010	West Coast	23	8	0	0	35	47	82	27	12	0.0	0.0	4.4	5.9	10.2	3.4	1.5
2011	West Coast	23	24	0	0	122	144	266	97	48	0.0	0.0	5.1	6.0	11.1	4.0	2.0
2012	West Coast	23	22	0	0	118	163	281	114	52	0.0	0.0	5.4	7.4	12.8	5.2	2.4
2013	West Coast	23	20	0	0	142	116	258	97	47	0.0	0.0	7.1	5.8	12.9	4.8	2.3
2014	West Coast	23	8	0	0	48	59	107	37	19	0.0	0.0	6.0	7.4	13.4	4.6	2.4
Career			270	8	3	1161	1734	2895	961	471	0.0	0.0	4.3	6.4	10.7	3.6	1.7

== Honours and achievements ==
Brownlow Medal votes
Season	Votes
2000	0
2001	0
2002	0
2003	0
2004	0
2005	0
2006	0
2007	2
2008	2
2009	3
2010	0
2011	0
2012	0
2013	4
Total	11

- Team
  - AFL Premiership (West Coast): 2006
  - McClelland Trophy (West Coast): 2006
- Individual
  - West Coast Club Champion Award (later named the John Worsfold Medal): 2007, 2009, 2011
  - All-Australian: 2006, 2007, 2011, 2012 (C)
  - West Coast Eagles Captain: 2008–2014
