= List of AFL debuts in 2007 =

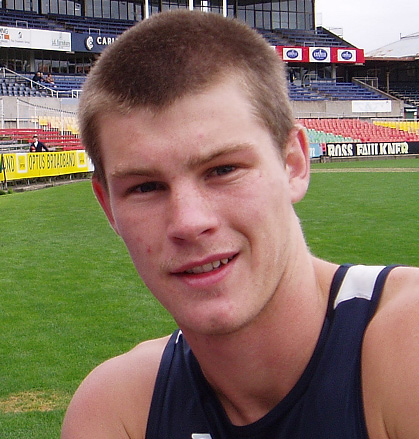
Bryce Gibbs made his AFL debut in 2007

This is a listing of Australian rules footballers who made their debut with a club during the 2007 Australian Football League season.

Name	Club	Age at debut	Round debuted	Games (to end of 2014)	Goals (to end of 2014)	Notes
Jonathon Griffin	Adelaide	21 years, 77 days	1	41	7	
John Hinge	Adelaide	22 years, 333 days	6	1	0	
Nick Gill	Adelaide	24 years, 338 days	17	17	21	
John Meesen	Adelaide	21 years, 60 days	20	2	0	
Chris Schmidt	Brisbane Lions	18 years, 74 days	10	2	0	
Albert Proud	Brisbane Lions	18 years, 284 days	12	29	10	
Daniel Dzufer	Brisbane Lions	19 years, 170 days	13	1	0	
Matthew Leuenberger	Brisbane Lions	19 years, 30 days	14	94	20	
Cain Ackland	Carlton	25 years, 16 days	1	21	4	Previously played for St Kilda and Port Adelaide.
Cameron Cloke	Carlton	25 years, 16 days	1	21	4	Son of David Cloke. Brother of Jason and Travis Cloke. Previously played for Collingwood.
Bryce Gibbs	Carlton	18 years, 17 days	1	177	98	Son of Ross Gibbs.
Joe Anderson	Carlton	18 years, 119 days	4	17	0	
Ross Young	Carlton	23 years, 237 days	6	6	3	
Adam Hartlett	Carlton	21 years, 34 days	9	11	2	Brother of Hamish Hartlett.
Shaun Grigg	Carlton	19 years, 80 days	14	43	10	
Michael Jamison	Carlton	21 years, 54 days	18	131	2	
Shaun Hampson	Carlton	19 years, 157 days	21	63	32	
Mark Austin	Carlton	18 years, 190 days	22	14	1	
Paul Medhurst	Collingwood	25 years, 110 days	1	69	108	Previously played for Fremantle.
Daniel Nicholls	Collingwood	20 years, 36 days	2	1	0	
Shannon Cox	Collingwood	21 years, 37 days	3	25	6	
Brad Dick	Collingwood	18 years, 262 days	3	27	32	
Alan Toovey	Collingwood	20 years, 21 days	3	131	9	
Chris Bryan	Collingwood	25 years, 50 days	5	30	10	Previously played for Carlton. Now a punter with the Green Bay Packers.
Tyson Goldsack	Collingwood	19 years, 363 days	8	124	47	
Danny Stanley	Collingwood	19 years, 113 days	11	5	0	
Martin Clarke	Collingwood	19 years, 222 days	12	73	9	
Ben Reid	Collingwood	18 years, 63 days	13	99	31	
Ryan Cook	Collingwood	19 years, 169 days	18	14	1	
Alwyn Davey	Essendon	22 years, 321 days	1	100	120	Brother of Aaron Davey.
Leroy Jetta	Essendon	18 years, 269 days	1	93	80	
Mal Michael	Essendon	29 years, 281 days	1	37	5	Previously played for Collingwood and Brisbane.
Bachar Houli	Essendon	18 years, 346 days	7	26	9	
Tom Hislop	Essendon	19 years, 29 days	14	7	2	
Scott Gumbleton	Essendon	18 years, 360 days	17	35	45	
Kyle Reimers	Essendon	18 years, 214 days	19	60	69	
Dean Solomon	Fremantle	27 years, 81 days	1	51	22	Previously played for Essendon.
Chris Tarrant	Fremantle	26 years, 194 days	1	72	60	Previously played for Collingwood.
Robert Warnock	Fremantle	20 years, 107 days	6	21	4	Brother of Matthew Warnock.
Clayton Collard	Fremantle	18 years, 172 days	9	1	0	
Garrick Ibbotson	Fremantle	19 years, 87 days	11	127	20	
Andrew Foster	Fremantle	21 years, 346 days	19	9	6	
Brock O'Brien	Fremantle	19 years, 94 days	22	3	1	
Joel Selwood	Geelong	18 years, 310 days	1	184	115	Brother of Adam, Troy and Scott Selwood.
Tom Hawkins	Geelong	18 years, 254 days	2	147	286	Son of Jack Hawkins.
Travis Varcoe	Geelong	18 years, 362 days	2	138	130	
Xavier Ellis	Hawthorn	19 years, 31 days	1	86	28	
Garry Moss	Hawthorn	18 years, 312 days	7	10	9	
Mitch Thorp	Hawthorn	18 years, 202 days	15	2	1	
Matthew Little	Hawthorn	21 years, 199 days	16	1	0	
Matt Campbell	Kangaroos	20 years, 69 days	1	82	79	
Lachlan Hansen	Kangaroos	18 years, 266 days	1	117	76	
Matt Riggio	Kangaroos	19 years, 17 days	1	10	0	
Lindsay Thomas	Kangaroos	19 years, 31 days	1	153	249	
Aaron Edwards	Kangaroos	23 years, 37 days	2	78	122	Previously played for West Coast.
Leigh Adams	Kangaroos	19 years, 23 days	5	8	6	
Colin Garland	Melbourne	19 years, 0 days	5	115	15	
Ricky Petterd	Melbourne	18 years, 278 days	5	54	55	
James Frawley	Melbourne	18 years, 249 days	9	139	18	Nephew of Danny Frawley.
Michael Newton	Melbourne	20 years, 63 days	13	25	30	
Simon Buckley	Melbourne	20 years, 81 days	14	21	3	
Adam Cockshell	Port Adelaide	20 years, 244 days	1	2	1	
Nathan Krakouer	Port Adelaide	18 years, 330 days	1	40	7	
David Rodan	Port Adelaide	23 years, 174 days	1	111	86	Previously played for Richmond.
Justin Westhoff	Port Adelaide	20 years, 245 days	10	159	204	
Robert Gray	Port Adelaide	19 years, 65 days	10	115	161	
Travis Boak	Port Adelaide	18 years, 320 days	12	155	93	
Graham Polak	Richmond	22 years, 289 days	1	38	16	Previously played for Fremantle.
Shane Edwards	Richmond	18 years, 177 days	4	152	101	
Jake King	Richmond	23 years, 25 days	4	107	79	
Kent Kingsley	Richmond	28 years, 242 days	9	3	2	Previously played for the Kangaroos and Geelong.
Jack Riewoldt	Richmond	18 years, 307 days	9	157	381	
Daniel Connors	Richmond	18 years, 309 days	17	29	11	
Angus Graham	Richmond	20 years, 110 days	18	48	18	
Jayden Attard	St Kilda	21 years, 31 days	1	20	2	Previously played for Brisbane.
Matthew Clarke	St Kilda	33 years, 193 days	1	10	0	Previously played for Brisbane and Adelaide.
Shane Birss	St Kilda	24 years, 25 days	2	20	13	Previously played for Western Bulldogs.
Clinton Jones	St Kilda	23 years, 71 days	3	149	40	
David Armitage	St Kilda	18 years, 337 days	8	107	67	
Brad Howard	St Kilda	19 years, 149 days	8	2	0	
Justin Sweeney	St Kilda	19 years, 145 days	8	1	0	
Peter Everitt	Sydney	32 years, 332 days	1	39	17	Previously played for St Kilda and Hawthorn.
Kieren Jack	Sydney	19 years, 311 days	6	163	120	
Matthew Laidlaw	Sydney	20 years, 141 days	13	1	0	
Luke Brennan	Sydney	22 years, 147 days	17	9	1	Previously played for Hawthorn.
Ed Barlow	Sydney	20 years, 203 days	20	26	18	
Mitch Brown	West Coast	18 years, 104 days	1	89	13	
Eric MacKenzie	West Coast	19 years, 56 days	15	121	6	
Ben McKinley	West Coast	20 years, 132 days	15	46	89	
Will Schofield	West Coast	18 years, 184 days	17	15	1	
Jamie McNamara	West Coast	19 years, 171 days	21	19	4	
Jason Akermanis	Western Bulldogs	30 years, 36 days	1	77	114	Previously played for Brisbane Lions. 2001 Brownlow Medallist.
Andrew McDougall	Western Bulldogs	23 years, 276 days	1	5	2	Previously played for West Coast Eagles.
Jarrod Harbrow	Western Bulldogs	18 years, 276 days	4	70	21	
Tom Williams	Western Bulldogs	20 years, 277 days	4	85	14	
Malcolm Lynch	Western Bulldogs	19 years, 92 days	12	2	0	
Andrejs Everitt	Western Bulldogs	18 years, 116 days	14	36	8	
Stephen Tiller	Western Bulldogs	20 years, 123 days	17	21	7	
