= 2006 AFL draft =

Draft for the Australian Football League

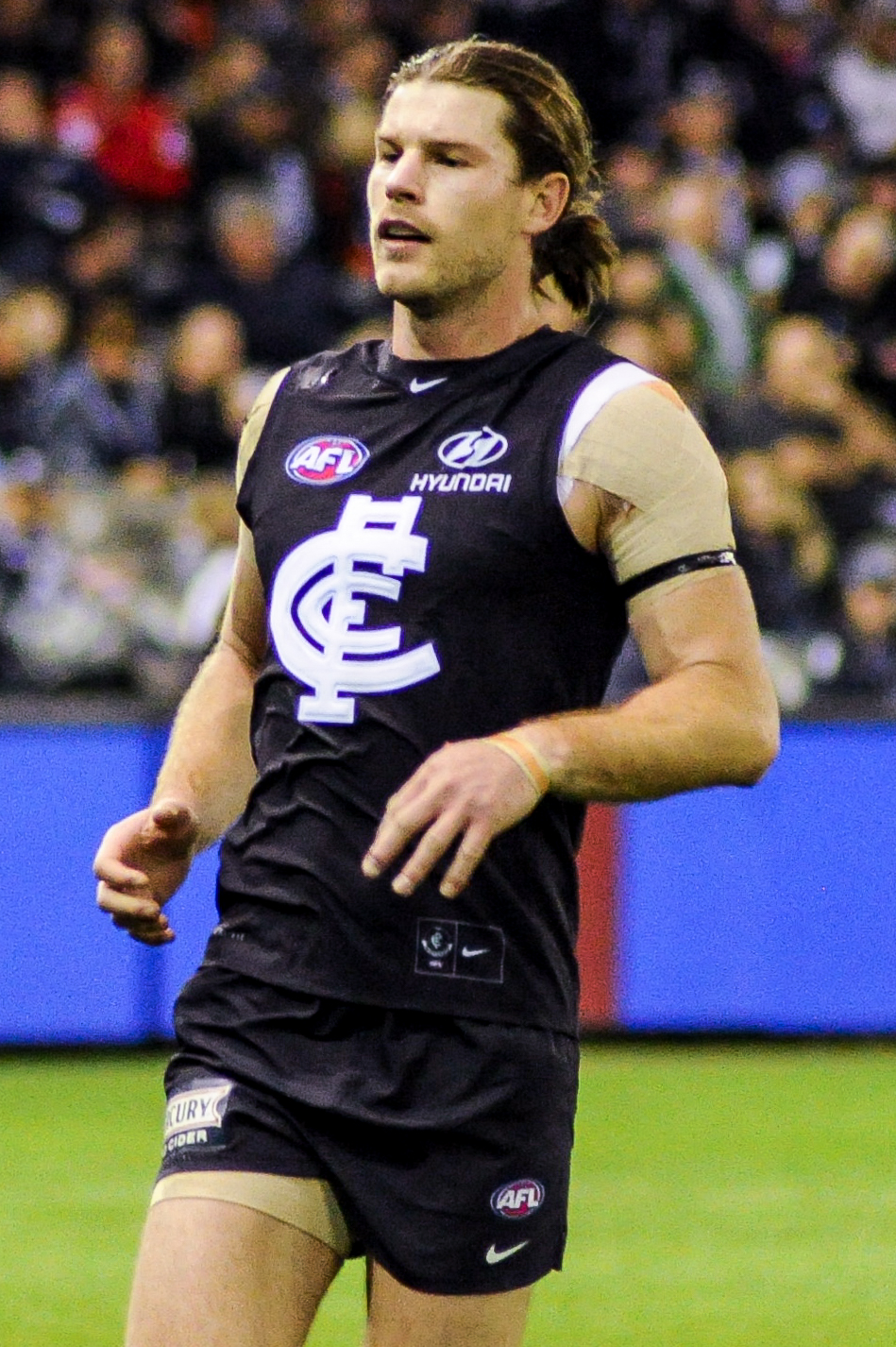
- Bryce Gibbs was the number one selection in the 2006 national draft

General information
- Date: 24 November 2006
- Sponsored by: National Australia Bank

Overview
- League: AFL
- First selection: Bryce Gibbs (Carlton)

The 2006 AFL draft is a recent national draft of the Australian Football League. The AFL draft is the annual draft of talented players by Australian rules football teams that participate in the main competition of that sport, the Australian Football League.

The 2006 AFL draft is noted as being the second "superdraft" since the draft system's inception, due to the wealth and depth of talent.

The AFL pre-season draft, rookie draft and trade week also occurred during the 2006/07 Australian Football League off-season.

== Trades ==
Trade week was held from 9 to 13 October 2006.

Table of trades in 2006
Clubs involved	Trade		Ref
St Kilda Western Bulldogs	to St Kilda: Shane Birss	to Western Bulldogs: pick #59	
West Coast Western Bulldogs	to West Coast: pick #29; pick #59	to Western Bulldogs: Andrew McDougall; pick #34	
Brisbane Lions Western Bulldogs	to Brisbane Lions: pick #34	to Western Bulldogs: Jason Akermanis	
Essendon Fremantle	to Essendon: pick #42; pick #47	to Fremantle: Dean Solomon; pick #52	
Collingwood Fremantle Richmond	to Fremantle (from Richmond): pick #8; pick #42	to Richmond (from Fremantle): Graham Polak; pick #13	
Collingwood Fremantle Richmond	to Collingwood (from Fremantle): Paul Medhurst; pick #8	to Fremantle (from Collingwood): Chris Tarrant	
Collingwood Fremantle Richmond	to Collingwood (from Richmond): pick #63	to Richmond (from Collingwood): pick #60	
Hawthorn Sydney	to Hawthorn: pick #33	to Sydney: Peter Everitt	
St Kilda West Coast	to St Kilda: Michael Gardiner; pick #59	to West Coast: pick #43	

== 2006 national draft ==
The 2006 national draft was held on 25 November 2006. Carlton Football Club had the first selection, choosing Bryce Gibbs from the Glenelg Football Club.

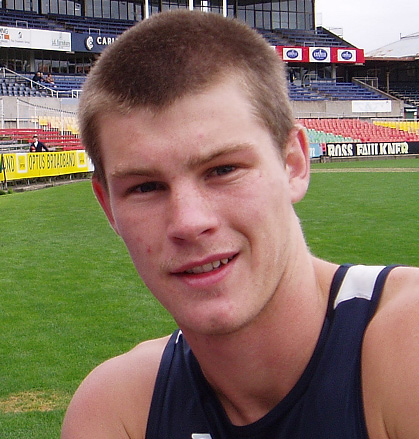
Bryce Gibbs, pick 1

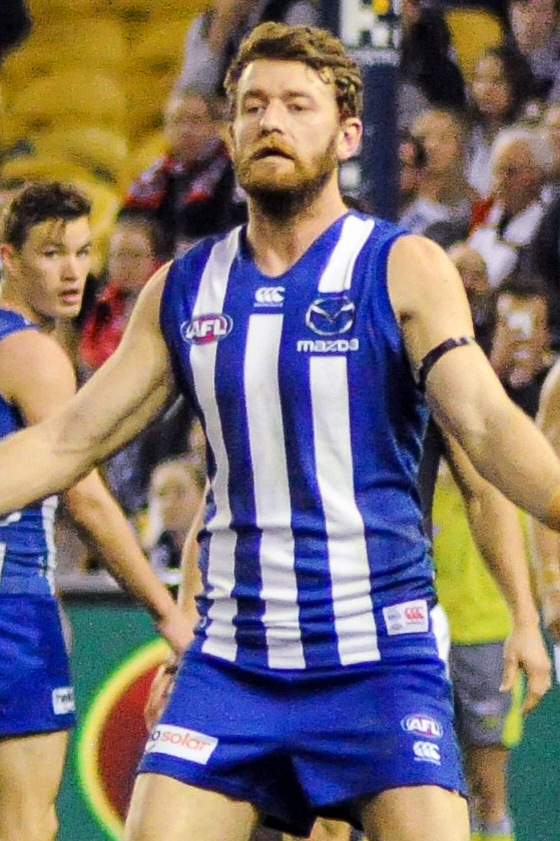
Lachlan Hansen, pick 3

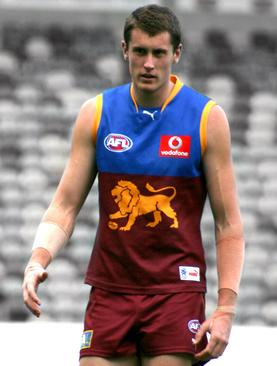
Matthew Leuenberger, pick 4

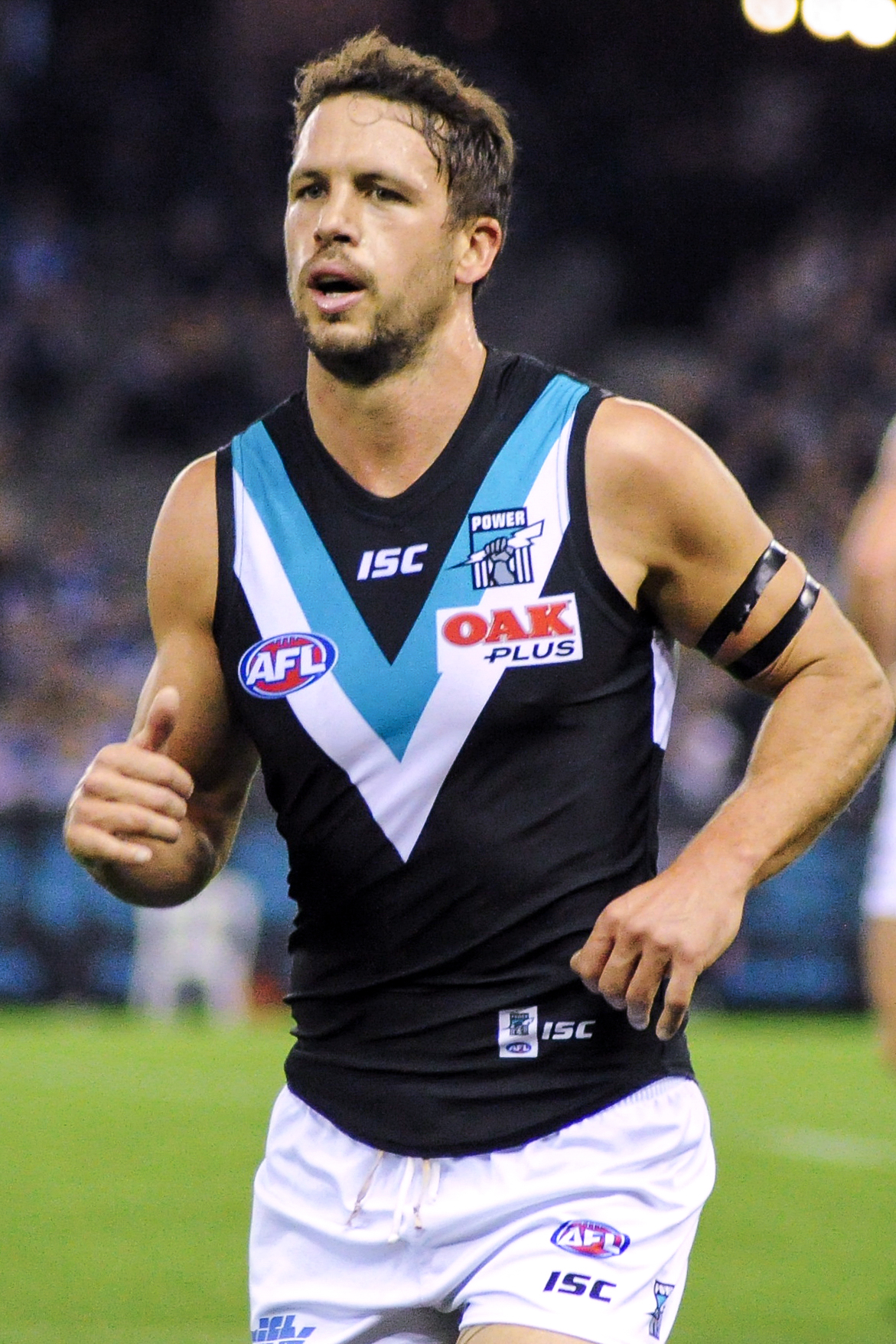
Travis Boak, pick 5

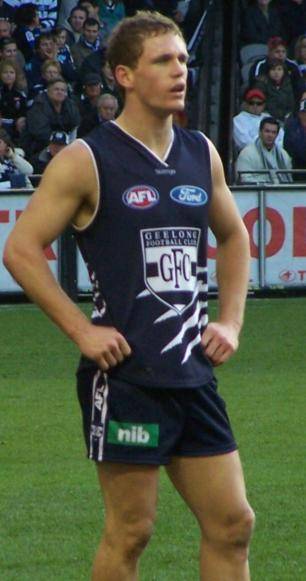
Joel Selwood, pick 7

*	Denotes player who has been a premiership player and been selected for at least one All-Australian team
^{+}	Denotes player who has been a premiership player at least once
^{x}	Denotes player who has been selected for at least one All-Australian team
^{#}	Denotes player who has never played in a VFL/AFL home and away season or finals game
^{~}	Denotes player who has been selected as Rising Star

Table of national draft selections
Round	Pick	Player	Club	Recruited from		Notes
Round	Pick	Player	Club	Club	League	Notes
1	1	Bryce Gibbs	Carlton	Glenelg	SANFL	
1	2	Scott Gumbleton	Essendon	Peel Thunder	WAFL	
1	3	Lachlan Hansen	Kangaroos	Gippsland Power	TAC Cup	
1	4	Matthew Leuenberger	Brisbane Lions	East Perth	WAFL	
1	5	Travis Boak	Port Adelaide	Geelong Falcons	TAC Cup	
1	6	Mitch Thorp	Hawthorn	Tassie Mariners	TAC Cup	
1	7	Joel Selwood	Geelong	Bendigo Pioneers	TAC Cup	
1	8	Ben Reid	Collingwood	Murray Bushrangers	TAC Cup	
1	9	David Armitage	St Kilda	Morningside	QAFL	
1	10	Nathan Brown	Collingwood	North Ballarat Rebels	TAC Cup	
1	11	Andrejs Everitt	Western Bulldogs	Dandenong Stingrays	TAC Cup	
1	12	James Frawley	Melbourne	North Ballarat Rebels	TAC Cup	
1	13	Jack Riewoldt	Richmond	Tassie Mariners	TAC Cup	
1	14	James Sellar	Adelaide	Glenelg	SANFL	
1	15	Daniel O'Keefe	Sydney	Geelong Falcons	TAC Cup	
1	16	Mitch Brown	West Coast	North Ballarat Rebels	TAC Cup	
Priority	17	Shaun Hampson	Carlton	Mount Gravatt	QAFL	
Priority	18	Leroy Jetta	Essendon	South Fremantle	WAFL	
2	19	Shaun Grigg	Carlton	North Ballarat Rebels	TAC Cup	
2	20	Tom Hislop	Essendon	Tassie Mariners	TAC Cup	
2	21	Gavin Urquhart	Kangaroos	Morningside	QAFL	
2	22	Albert Proud	Brisbane Lions	Mount Gravatt	QAFL	
2	23	Paul Stewart	Port Adelaide	Woodville-West Torrens	SANFL	
2	24	Brent Renouf	Hawthorn	Southport	QAFL	
2	25	Nathan Djerrkura	Geelong	Wanderers	NTFL	
2	26	Shane Edwards	Richmond	North Adelaide	SANFL	
2	27	Brad Howard	St Kilda	Redland	QAFL	
2	28	Chris Dawes	Collingwood	Sandringham Dragons	TAC Cup	
2	29	Eric MacKenzie	West Coast	Claremont	WAFL	
2	30	Ricky Petterd	Melbourne	Broadbeach	QAFL	
2	31	Clayton Collard	Fremantle	South Fremantle	WAFL	
2	32	Kurt Tippett	Adelaide	Southport	QAFL	
2	33	Jarryd Morton	Hawthorn	Claremont	WAFL	
2	34	Chris Schmidt	Brisbane Lions	West Adelaide	SANFL	
3	35	Mark Austin	Carlton	Glenelg	SANFL	
3	36	Alwyn Davey	Essendon	South Adelaide	SANFL	
3	37	Todd Goldstein	Kangaroos	Oakleigh Chargers	TAC Cup	
3	38	James Hawksley	Brisbane Lions	Peel Thunder	WAFL	
3	39	Nathan Krakouer	Port Adelaide	Claremont	WAFL	
3	40	Josh Kennedy	Hawthorn	Sandringham Dragons	TAC Cup	Father–son rule
3	41	Tom Hawkins	Geelong	Sandringham Dragons	TAC Cup	Father–son rule
3	42	Bachar Houli	Essendon	Western Jets	TAC Cup	
3	43	Tim Houlihan	West Coast	North Ballarat Rebels	TAC Cup	
3	44	Brad Dick	Collingwood	East Fremantle	WAFL	
3	45	Brennan Stack	Western Bulldogs	Perth	WAFL	
3	46	Colin Garland	Melbourne	Tassie Mariners	TAC Cup	
3	47	Kyle Reimers	Essendon	Peel Thunder	WAFL	
3	48	David Mackay	Adelaide	Oakleigh Chargers	TAC Cup	
3	49	Daniel Currie	Sydney	Northern Knights	TAC Cup	
3	50	Will Schofield	West Coast	Geelong Falcons	TAC Cup	
4	51	Clint Benjamin	Carlton	Claremont	WAFL	
4	52	Brock O'Brien	Fremantle	Peel Thunder	WAFL	
4	53	Lindsay Thomas	Kangaroos	Port Adelaide	SANFL	
4	54	Matt Tyler	Brisbane Lions	North Ballarat Rebels	TAC Cup	
4	55	Robbie Gray	Port Adelaide	Oakleigh Chargers	TAC Cup	
4	56	Garry Moss	Hawthorn	East Perth	WAFL	
4	57	Simon Hogan	Geelong	Geelong Falcons	TAC Cup	
4	58	Daniel Connors	Richmond	Bendigo Pioneers	TAC Cup	
4	59	Jarryd Allen	St Kilda	Calder Cannons	TAC Cup	
4	60	Carl Peterson	Richmond	Claremont	WAFL	
4	61	Josh Hill	Western Bulldogs	Claremont	WAFL	
4	62	Isaac Weetra	Melbourne	Port Adelaide	SANFL	
4	63	Tyson Goldsack	Collingwood	Gippsland Power	TAC Cup	
4	64	Nick Gill	Adelaide	North Adelaide	SANFL	
4	65	Peter Faulks	Sydney	Calder Cannons	TAC Cup	
4	66	Malcolm Lynch	Western Bulldogs	NSW/ACT Rams	TAC Cup	
5	67	Joe Anderson	Carlton	Darwin	NTFL	
5	68	Pass	Essendon	—	—	
5	69	Ben Warren	Kangaroos	Zillmere Eagles	QAFL	
5	70	Sam Sheldon	Brisbane Lions	Oakleigh Chargers	TAC Cup	
5	71	Justin Westhoff	Port Adelaide	Central District	SANFL	
5	72	Pass	Hawthorn	—	—	
5	73	Andrew Collins	Richmond	Bendigo Pioneers	TAC Cup	
5	74	Matthew Ferguson	St Kilda	St Kilda	AFL	redrafted
5	75	Pass	Collingwood	—	—	
5	76	Paul O'Shea	Western Bulldogs	Redland	QAFL	
5	77	Calib Mourish	Fremantle	East Fremantle	WAFL	
5	78	Bryce Campbell	Adelaide	Norwood	SANFL	
5	79	Jesse White	Sydney	Southport	QAFL	
5	80	James Thomson	West Coast	Claremont	WAFL	
6	81	Pass	Carlton	—	—	
6	82	Aaron Edwards	Kangaroos	Frankston	VFL	
6	83	Ryan Williams	Port Adelaide	Geelong Falcons	TAC Cup	
6	84	Pass	Richmond	—	—	
6	85	Pass	St Kilda	—	—	
7	86	David Rodan	Port Adelaide	Richmond	AFL	
7	87	Pass	St Kilda	—	—	
8	88	Pass	Port Adelaide	—	—	
8	89	Pass	St Kilda	—	—	

=== Rookie elevations ===
Table of rookie elevations
Player	Club
Scott Harding	Brisbane Lions
Jason Roe	Brisbane Lions
Cheynee Stiller	Brisbane Lions
Craig Flint	Carlton
Shannon Cox	Collingwood
Harry O'Brien	Collingwood
Alan Toovey	Collingwood
Paul Duffield	Fremantle
Sam Hunt	Geelong
Stephen Gilham	Hawthorn
Ben McGlynn	Hawthorn
Ed Lower	Kangaroos
Scott McMahon	Kangaroos
Djaran Whyman	Kangaroos
Matthew Warnock	Melbourne
Greg Bentley	Port Adelaide
Tom Logan	Port Adelaide
Simon Phillips	Sydney
Jonathan Simpkin	Sydney
Steven Armstrong	West Coast
Matt Priddis	West Coast

== 2007 pre-season draft ==
Table of pre-season draft selections
Pick	Player	Club	Recruited from		Notes
Pick	Player	Club	Club	League	Notes
1	Cain Ackland	Carlton	St Kilda	AFL	
2	Mal Michael	Essendon	Brisbane Lions	AFL	
3	Ben Ross	Kangaroos	Gippsland Power	TAC Cup	
4	Adam Cockshell	Port Adelaide	Norwood	SANFL	
5	Josh Thurgood	Hawthorn	Hawthorn	AFL	redrafted
6	Kent Kingsley	Richmond	Geelong	AFL	
7	Matthew Clarke	St Kilda	Adelaide	AFL	
8	Chris Bryan	Collingwood	Carlton	AFL	
9	Cameron Cloke	Carlton	Collingwood	AFL	

== 2007 rookie draft ==
Table of rookie draft selections
Pick	Player	Club	Recruited from		Notes
Pick	Player	Club	Club	League	Notes
1	Sam Jacobs	Carlton	Woodville-West Torrens	SANFL	
2	Dean Dick	Essendon	Perth	WAFL	
3	Leigh Adams	Kangaroos	Eastern Ranges	TAC Cup	
4	Anthony Corrie	Brisbane Lions	Brisbane Lions	AFL	redrafted
5	Alex Lee	Port Adelaide	Dandenong Stingrays	TAC Cup	
6	Brett Collins	Hawthorn	St Bedes	VAFA	
7	Joel Reynolds	Geelong	Essendon	AFL	
8	Tasman Clingan	Richmond	North Ballarat Rebels	TAC Cup	
9	Clinton Jones	St Kilda	South Fremantle	WAFL	
10	Sharrod Wellingham	Collingwood	Perth	WAFL	
11	Gavin Hughes	Western Bulldogs	Norwood	SANFL	
12	Daniel Hayes	Melbourne	Eastern Ranges	TAC Cup	
13	Chris Smith	Fremantle	Mount Gravatt	QAFL	
14	Andrew McIntyre	Adelaide	North Adelaide	SANFL	
15	Nick Smith	Sydney	Oakleigh Chargers	TAC Cup	
16	Jamie McNamara	West Coast	East Fremantle	WAFL	
17	Michael Jamison	Carlton	North Ballarat	VFL	
18	Danny Chartres	Essendon	Peel Thunder	WAFL	
19	Ben Hughes	Kangaroos	Gippsland Power	TAC Cup	
20	Scott Clouston	Brisbane Lions	Morningside	QAFL	
21	Gavin Grose	Port Adelaide	Mount Gravatt	QAFL	
22	Matt Suckling	Hawthorn	Wagga Tigers	RFNL	
23	Liam Bedford	Geelong	Claremont	WAFL	
24	Jake King	Richmond	Coburg	VFL	
25	Luke van Rheenen	St Kilda	Scoresby	EFL	
26	Brent Macaffer	Collingwood	Gippsland Power	TAC Cup	
27	Jarrod Harbrow	Western Bulldogs	Murray Bushrangers	TAC Cup	
28	Andrew Foster	Fremantle	East Fremantle	WAFL	
29	James Turner	Adelaide	South Adelaide	SANFL	
30	Matthew O'Dwyer	Sydney	Oakleigh Chargers	TAC Cup	
31	Llane Spaanderman	West Coast	East Perth	WAFL	
32	Ross Young	Carlton	Northern Bullants	VFL	
33	Adam Ramanauskas	Essendon	Essendon	AFL	redrafted
34	Matt Campbell	Kangaroos	Pioneers	CAFL	
35	Daniel Dzufer	Brisbane Lions	Suncoast Lions	QAFL	
36	Nathan Batsanis	Port Adelaide	Oakleigh Chargers	TAC Cup	
37	Sam Gibson	Hawthorn	Oakleigh Chargers	TAC Cup	
38	Jason Davenport	Geelong	Geelong	VFL	
39	Robert Eddy	St Kilda	Gippsland Power	TAC Cup	
40	Martin Clarke	Collingwood	International rookie	—	
41	Marty Pask	Western Bulldogs	Brisbane Lions	AFL	
42	Darren Rumble	Fremantle	Subiaco	WAFL	
43	Rhys Archard	Adelaide	South Adelaide	SANFL	
44	Luke Brennan	Sydney	Hawthorn	AFL	
45	Chad Jones	West Coast	Kangaroos	AFL	
46	Pass	Carlton	—	—	
47	Tim Hutchison	Kangaroos	Kangaroos	AFL	redrafted
48	Haydyn Kiel	Brisbane Lions	Southport	QAFL	
49	Peter Hardy	Port Adelaide	Geelong Falcons	TAC Cup	
50	Tom Lonergan	Geelong	Geelong	AFL	redrafted
51	James Wall	St Kilda	Sydney	AFL	
52	Michael West	Western Bulldogs	Western Bulldogs	AFL	redrafted
53	Benet Copping	Fremantle	Fremantle	AFL	redrafted
54	Greg Gallman	Adelaide	North Adelaide	SANFL	
55	Matthew Davis	Sydney	Sydney	AFL	redrafted
56	Ben Sharp	West Coast	West Coast	AFL	redrafted
57	Joel Tippett	Brisbane Lions	Southport	QAFL	
58	Jarryn Geary	St Kilda	Bendigo Pioneers	TAC Cup	
59	Earl Shaw	Sydney	Sydney	AFL	redrafted
60	Ashley Thornton	West Coast	West Coast	AFL	redrafted
61	Will Hamill	Brisbane Lions	Brisbane Lions	AFL	redrafted
62	Jayden Attard	St Kilda	Brisbane Lions	AFL	
63	Pass	Sydney	—	—	
64	Beau Maister	West Coast	West Coast	AFL	redrafted
