= 2006 AFL Under 18 Championships =

Youth Australian rules football competition

- Teams: 8

Division 1
- Teams: 4
- Champions: Vic Metro
- Larke Medal: Tom Hawkins

Division 2
- Teams: 4
- Champions: Queensland
- Hunter Harrison Medal: Ricky Petterd

The 2006 NAB AFL Under 18 Championships was the 11th edition of the AFL Under 18 Championships. Eight teams competed in the championships: Vic Metro, Vic Country, South Australia and Western Australia in Division 1, and New South Wales/Australian Capital Territory (NSW/ACT), Northern Territory, Queensland and Tasmania in Division 2. The competition was played over three rounds across two divisions. Vic Metro and Queensland were the Division 1 and Division 2 champions, respectively. The Larke Medal (for the best player in Division 1) was awarded to Victoria Metro's Tom Hawkins, and the Hunter Harrison Medal (for the best player in Division 2) was won by Queensland's Ricky Petterd.

== Results ==
=== Division 1 ===
	Round 1
Sunday, 25 June	Vic Country 14.8 (92)	def.	Western Australia 11.14 (80)	MC Labour Park	Report
Sunday, 25 June	Vic Metro 17.13 (115)	def.	South Australia 8.8 (56)	MC Labour Park	Report

	Round 2
Wednesday, 28 June	Vic Metro 12.16 (88)	def.	Western Australia 9.16 (70)	Skilled Stadium	Report
Wednesday, 28 June	Vic Country 13.8 (86)	def.	South Australia 8.7 (55)	Skilled Stadium	Report

	Round 3
Sunday, 2 July	South Australia 9.11 (65)	def.	Western Australia 4.9 (33)	MC Labour Park	Report
Sunday, 2 July	Vic Metro 4.10 (34)	def.	Vic Country 2.9 (21)	MC Labour Park	Report

Division 1 Ladder

TEAM	WON	LOST	PERCENTAGE
Vic Metro	3	0	161.2%
Vic Country	2	1	117.8%
South Australia	1	2	75.4%
Western Australia	0	3	74.7%

=== Division 2 ===
	Round 1
Saturday, 24 June	Northern Territory 10.10 (70)	def. by	Queensland 15.8 (98)	MC Labour Park	Report
Saturday, 24 June	Tasmania 11.12 (78)	def.	NSW/ACT 10.7 (67)	MC Labour Park	Report

	Round 2
Tuesday, 27 June	Queensland 23.14 (152)	def.	NSW/ACT 5.6 (36)	Skilled Stadium	Report
Tuesday, 27 June	Tasmania 9.5 (59)	def. by	Northern Territory 14.11 (95)	Skilled Stadium	Report

	Round 3
Saturday, 1 July	Northern Territory 14.22 (106)	def.	NSW/ACT 15.8 (98)	MC Labour Park	Report
Saturday, 1 July	Queensland 12.16 (88)	def.	Tasmania 7.7 (49)	MC Labour Park	Report

Division 2 Ladder

TEAM	WON	LOST	PERCENTAGE
Queensland	3	0	218.1%
Northern Territory	2	1	106.3%
Tasmania	1	2	74.4%
NSW/ACT	0	3	59.8%

== Under 18 All-Australian team ==
The 2006 Under 18 All-Australian team was named on 30 June 2006:

2006 Under 18 All-Australian team
B:	Patrick Veszpremi (VM)	Nathan Brown (VC)	Mitch Thorp (Tas)
HB:	David Armitage (Qld)	Lachlan Hansen (VC)	Ricky Petterd (Qld)
C:	Daniel Connors (VC)	Garry Moss (WA)	Shaun Grigg (VC)
HF:	Leroy Jetta (WA)	Scott Gumbleton (WA)	Daniel Dzufer (Qld)
F:	Tom Hislop (Tas)	Tom Hawkins (VM)	Tom Hurley (SA)
Foll:	Matthew Leuenberger (WA)	Bryce Gibbs (SA)	Leigh Adams (VM)
Int:	Craig Bird (NSW/ACT)	Nathan Djerrkura (NT)	Jarryd Allen (VM)
Int:	Robert Eddy (VC)		
Coach:	David Dickson (VM), assistant coach - Craig McRae (Qld)		
