= Stibbard (surname) =

Stibbard is a surname. Notable people with the surname include:

- Neville Stibbard (1923–1994), Australian rules footballer
- Neville Stibbard (born 1952), Australian rules footballer
- Robert Stibbard (born 1952), Australian rules footballer
