= Neville Stibbard =

Neville Stibbard may refer to:

- Neville Stibbard (footballer, born 1923), Australian rules footballer for South Melbourne and North Melbourne
- Neville Stibbard (footballer, born 1952), AFL recruiter and former Australian rules footballer for South Melbourne
