= Jarrod Harbrow =

Australian rules footballer

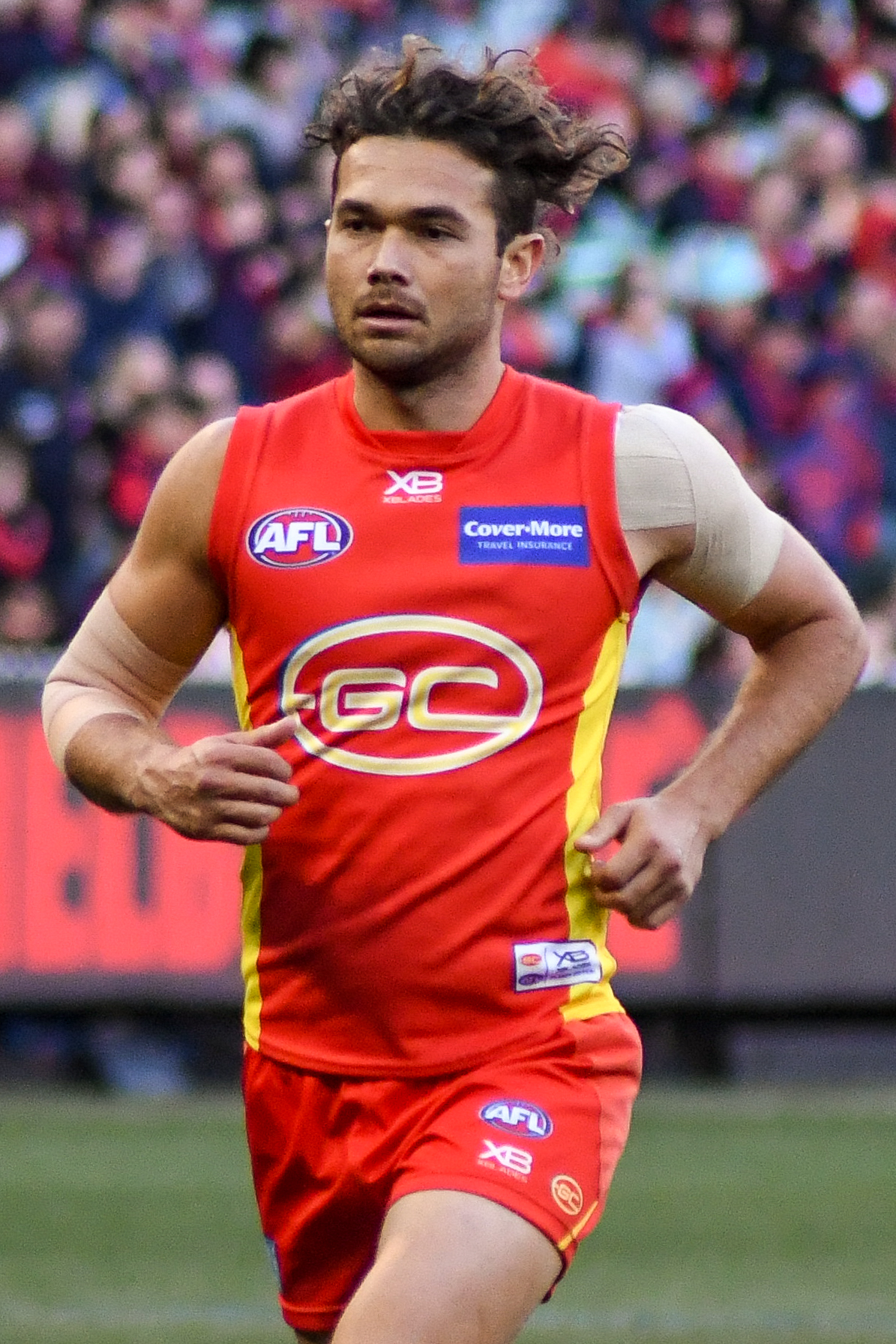
- Harbrow playing for Gold Coast in August 2018

Personal information
- Full name: Jarrod Harbrow
- Born: 18 July 1988 (age 38); Cairns, Queensland, Australia
- Original teams: South Cairns Cutters (AFL Cairns); Murray Bushrangers (TAC Cup)
- Draft: No. 27, 2007 Rookie Draft, Western Bulldogs
- Height: 178 cm (5 ft 10 in)
- Weight: 74 kg (163 lb)
- Position: Defender

Playing career^{1}
Years	Club	Games (Goals)
2007–2010	Western Bulldogs	70 (21)
2011–2021	Gold Coast	192 (33)
Total		262 (54)

Representative team honours^{2}
Years	Team	Games (Goals)
2009–2015	Indigenous All-Stars	3

International team honours^{2}
2013	Australia	2
- ^{1} Playing statistics correct to the end of round 5, 2021.^{2} Representative statistics correct as of 2015.

Career highlights
- Inaugural Gold Coast AFL team; Gold Coast Suns Club Champion: 2018

Jarrod Harbrow (born 18 July 1988) is a former professional Australian rules footballer who played for the Western Bulldogs and Gold Coast Suns in the Australian Football League (AFL).

== Early life ==
Harbrow was born in Cairns to an Indigenous Australian mother from Cairns and a Caucasian father from Mooroopna, Victoria. His Indigenous ancestry can be traced to the Yirrganydji and Kuku Yalanji rainforest tribes in Far North Queensland. He grew up in the town of Cairns, in Queensland and began playing junior football with the Manunda Hawks and then the South Cairns in the AFL Cairns competition. He attended Woree State School while based in Cairns.

When Harbrow was 13, his brother was rushed to the Townsville Hospital after being diagnosed with leukemia. As a result, Jarrod moved to Townsville with his family for one year and gave his brother bone marrow to survive leukemia. He continued to play junior football for the Hermit Park Tigers and attended Townsville Grammar School.

In 2005, at the age of 16, Harbrow moved to country Victoria where he played for the Mooroopna Football Club before joining the TAC Cup side the Murray Bushrangers in a bid to nominate for the AFL Draft. He represented Queensland at both the 2004 AFL Under 16 Championships and 2006 AFL Under 18 Championships, both sides winning the respective division titles.

He was overlooked in the 2006 AFL draft, however had already attracted the attention of AFL talent scouts Peter Dean and Scott Clayton.

== AFL career ==
Drafted as a rookie, Harbrow was picked up by the Bulldogs in the 2007 rookie draft.

Following only a short time in development playing for the Bulldogs VFL affiliate Werribee, Harbrow was called up for his AFL debut against the Richmond Tigers in Round 4, 2007.

He went on to become a regular senior player with the club.

In 2009, after a slow start to the season, he was moved into defence against North Melbourne and went on to establish himself as a regular player. During that season, he played against small forwards including Matt Campbell, Stephen Milne, Brad Dick, and Mathew Stokes.

At the conclusion of the 2010 season, the Bulldogs confirmed Jarrod would be the newest uncontracted player to join the Gold Coast Suns. The announcement was made shortly after the Bulldogs were eliminated from the finals. He ultimately joined the Gold Coast Suns.

Jarrod was the fifth uncontracted player from an AFL club to join the Suns.

Jarrod played his 100th AFL game in Round 18, 2012 against Sydney. In round 7, 2016 he became the first Gold Coast player to play 100 AFL games.

In round 19, 2018, Harbrow became the first Gold Coast player to play 150 games for the club. The club board ratified the decision to award him life membership. He also won The Gold Coast Club Champion award in 2018, Gold Coast's Best & Fairest award.

On August 17, 2021, Harbrow announced that he would retire after the Suns season finale against the Sydney Swans.
