= Jesse White (footballer) =

Australian rules footballer (born 1988)

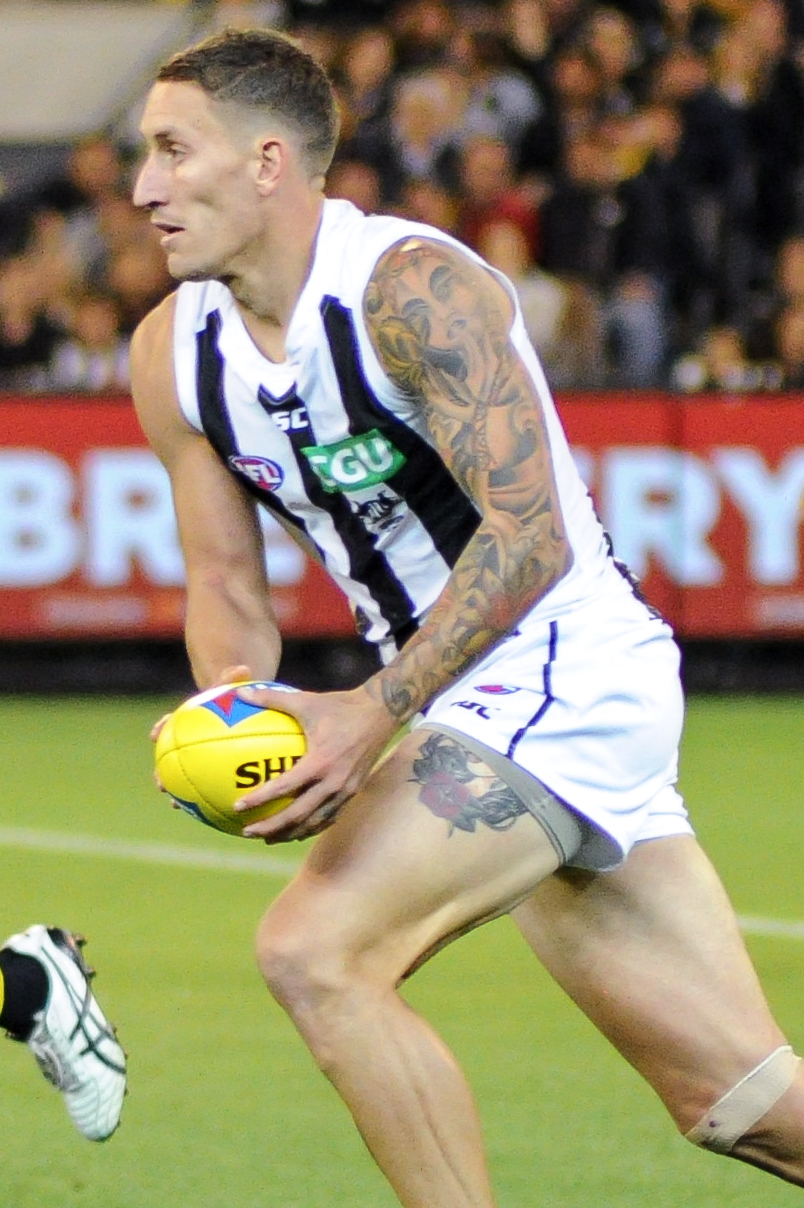
- White in March 2017

Personal information
- Full name: Jesse White
- Born: 9 January 1988 (age 38); Melbourne, Australia
- Original team: Southport (QAFL)
- Draft: No. 79, 2006 national draft
- Height: 196 cm (6 ft 5 in)
- Weight: 102 kg (225 lb)
- Position: Forward

Playing career
Years	Club	Games (Goals)
2007–2013	Sydney	71 (73)
2014–2017	Collingwood	56 (75)
Total		127 (148)

Career highlights
- 2009 AFL Rising Star nominee; SANFL premiership player: 2019

Jesse Jackson White (born 9 January 1988 in Melbourne) is a professional Australian rules footballer who plays for SANFL club North Adelaide Football Club and formerly for the Sydney Swans and Collingwood Football Club in the Australian Football League (AFL). He was drafted by Sydney Swans with pick 79 in the 2006 national draft.

== Early life ==
White was born in Melbourne. His family moved to the Gold Coast when he was two years old, and he attended John Paul College during his high school years. He was first selected to represent Queensland in basketball at under 12 level, and continued to make representative teams up to under 18 level. In 2005, he rejected a scholarship offer from the Australian Institute of Sport to concentrate on Australian football.

== Junior football ==
White played his junior football at the Surfers Paradise Australian Football Club on the Gold Coast. He was selected to represent Queensland in 2004 at under 16 level, while playing for Surfers Paradise. He switched to the Southport Australian Football Club to play both under 18 and senior football. Despite having a good year for Southport and the under 18 Queensland team, he was overlooked in the 2005 AFL draft. He remained at Southport for the 2006 season, winning the QAFL premiership and was a standout performer in Queensland's victorious run at the 2006 AFL Under 18 Championships.

== AFL career ==
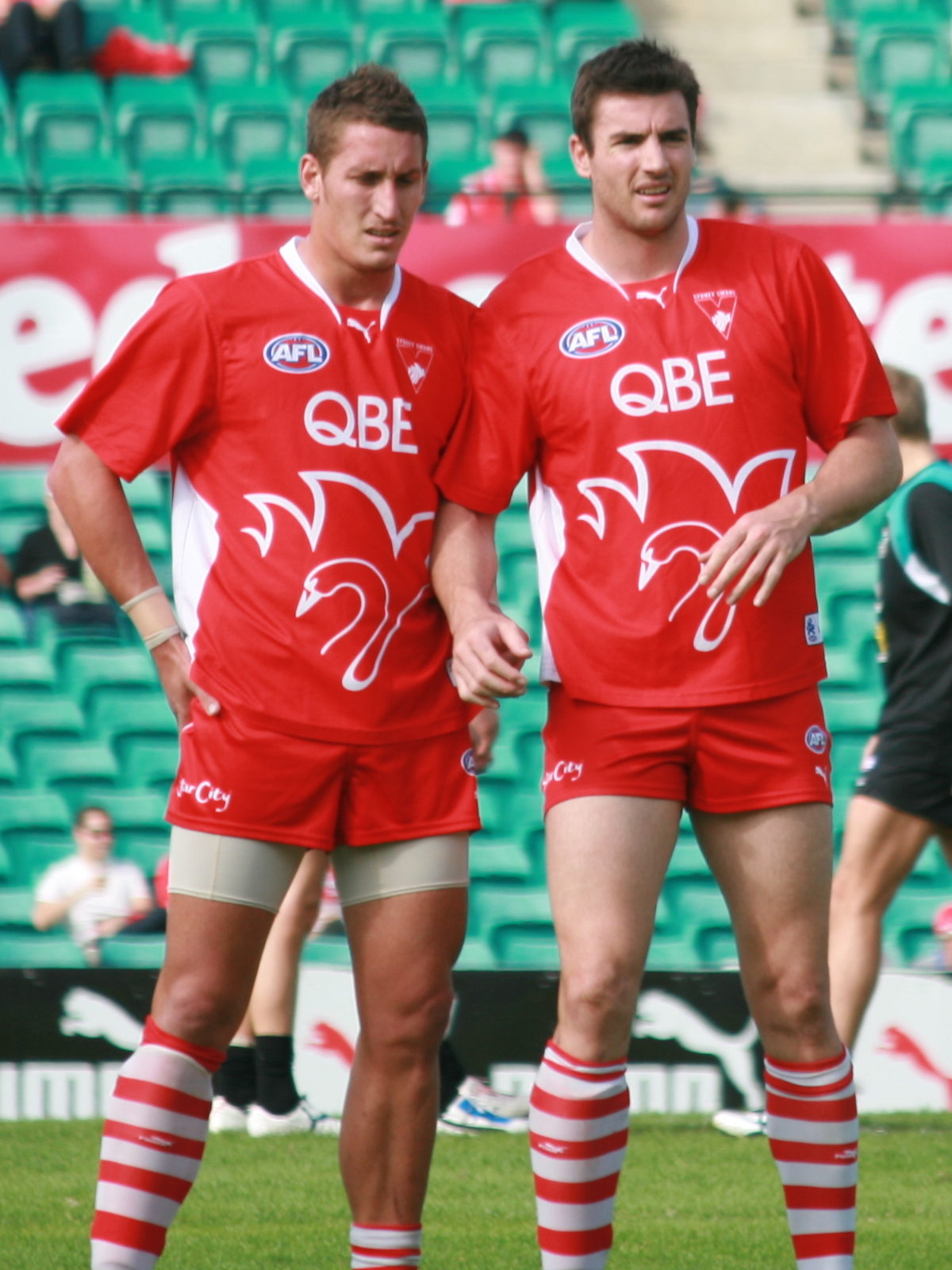
White (left) with fellow Sydney ruckman Darren Jolly in 2009

White was drafted by the Sydney Swans with pick 79 in the 2006 AFL draft. Despite being drafted in 2006, White didn't make his league debut until round 6, 2008, under controversial circumstances, when White mistakenly entered the playing field before Darren Jolly had left the field in the final minutes of their drawn match against North Melbourne. The AFL fined Sydney $50,000 for having an extra man on the field for approximately 18 seconds, which led to the formation of the new interchange policy.

In round 22 of the 2009 AFL season, White was rewarded with a nomination for the 2009 AFL Rising Star award.

White's playing style is primarily a forward that can also ruck. After Peter Everitt retired, White played as the second ruck to Darren Jolly. After Barry Hall's retirement and subsequent trade to Western Bulldogs in the 2009 off-season, White was moved into the forward line, kicking four goals in his first match as a forward. The Swans re-signed him in 2010 on a three-year contract to prevent the new club, Gold Coast from recruiting him. Despite promising performances as a forward throughout the 2010 season, he spent considerable time in the North East Australian Football League (NEAFL) throughout 2011 and the 2012 premiership year, due to inconsistent form.

With a season left to run on his contract, the Swans attempted to use White in the trade for Kurt Tippett with Adelaide. The subsequent AFL investigation from the attempted trade discovered that Adelaide had breached the salary cap and contract laws governing the players. White remained a Swans player for the 2013 season. With Goodes injured for most of the season, White was often instrumental, kicking 20 goals in 15 games, with his best match against Adelaide, individually outscoring Adelaide with three goals to three quarter time.

Despite his improved performances and Sydney's attempts to re-sign him, he moved to Collingwood in a three-way trade with Sydney, Collingwood and the West Coast Eagles. On 10 August 2017, White announced his retirement from AFL football at the end of the season.

== Post-AFL career ==
Following his retirement from AFL, White began training with National Basketball League side Melbourne United. filters.

In 2018, he returned to football signing with SANFL club Glenelg Football Club.

In 2019, Jesse won the SANFL premiership and the Glenelg Football Club J H Eller Best and Fairest award and announced his retirement

== Statistics ==
As of the completion of the 2017 season

Legend
G	Goals	K	Kicks	D	Disposals	T	Tackles
B	Behinds	H	Handballs	M	Marks

Season	Team	No.	Games	Totals							Averages (per game)						
Season	Team	No.	Games	G	B	K	H	D	M	T	G	B	K	H	D	M	T
2008	Sydney	18	2	0	0	5	4	9	5	5	0.0	0.0	2.5	2	4.5	2.5	2.5
2009	Sydney	18	18	20	13	86	56	142	72	20	1.1	0.7	4.8	3.1	7.9	4	1.1
2010	Sydney	18	20	22	12	87	81	168	65	20	1.1	0.6	4.4	4.1	8.5	3.3	1
2011	Sydney	18	13	9	1	54	48	102	26	39	0.6	0.4	12.1	11.0	23.1	4.5	3.1
2012	Sydney	18	3	2	0	19	10	29	12	7	0.7	0.0	6.3	3.3	9.6	4	2.3
2013	Sydney	18	15	20	12	109	81	190	72	26	1.3	0.8	7.3	5.4	12.7	4.8	1.7
2014	Collingwood	18	18	20	14	126	63	189	59	38	1.1	0.8	7.0	3.3	10.3	3.3	2.1
2015	Collingwood	9	18	27	19	145	79	224	88	30	1.5	1.1	8.1	4.4	12.4	4.9	1.7
2016	Collingwood	9	16	23	20	152	59	211	86	35	1.4	1.3	9.5	3.7	13.2	5.4	2.2
2017	Collingwood	9	4	5	5	34	16	50	19	6	1.3	1.3	8.5	4.0	12.5	4.8	1.5
Career			127	148	106	817	497	1314	504	226	1.2	0.8	6.4	3.9	10.4	4.0	1.8
