= 2007 AFL Rising Star =

Australian rules football award

2007 NAB AFL Rising Star
- Sponsored by: National Australia Bank
- Country: Australia
- Ron Evans medallist: Joel Selwood (Geelong)

The NAB Rising Star award is given annually to a standout young player in the Australian Football League. This was the first time the winner was presented with the Ron Evans medal, with it being awarded annually since. The 2007 winner was Joel Selwood of the Geelong Football Club.

== Eligibility ==
Every round, an Australian Football League rising star nomination is given to a standout young player. To be eligible for the award, a player must be under 21 on 1 January of that year, have played 10 or fewer senior games and not been suspended during the season. At the end of the year, one of the 22 nominees is the winner of award.

== Nominations ==
Round	Player	Club	Ref.
1	Patrick Ryder	Essendon	
2	Cameron Wood	Brisbane Lions	
3	Tom Hawkins	Geelong	
4	Scott Pendlebury	Collingwood	
5	Joel Selwood	Geelong	
6	Ricky Petterd	Melbourne	
7	Jesse Smith	Kangaroos	
8	Shaun Higgins	Western Bulldogs	
9	Mitch Clark	Brisbane Lions	
10	Bryce Gibbs	Carlton	
11	Shannon Hurn	West Coast	
12	Robbie Gray	Port Adelaide	
13	Martin Clarke	Collingwood	
14	Scott McMahon	Kangaroos	
15	Justin Westhoff	Port Adelaide	
16	Sam Gilbert	St Kilda	
17	Nathan Jones	Melbourne	
18	Tom Williams	Western Bulldogs	
19	Travis Boak	Port Adelaide	
20	Mark LeCras	West Coast	
21	Tyson Goldsack	Collingwood	
22	Will Thursfield	Richmond	

== Final voting ==
	Player	Club	Votes
1	Joel Selwood	Geelong	44
2	Scott Pendlebury	Collingwood	37
3	Nathan Jones	Melbourne	17
4	Justin Westhoff	Port Adelaide	10
5	Shannon Hurn	West Coast	9
6	Bryce Gibbs	Carlton	6
7	Patrick Ryder	Essendon	2
7	Tom Williams	Western Bulldogs	2
9	Martin Clarke	Collingwood	1
Source: AFL Record Season Guide 2015
