= Bryce Campbell (Australian footballer) =

Australian rules footballer (born 1984)

Personal information
- Born: 7 September 1984 (age 42)
- Original team: Wagga Wagga / Norwood
- Draft: 78th, 2006 National Draft
- Height: 184 cm (6 ft 0 in)
- Weight: 80 kg (176 lb)

Playing career^{1}
Years	Club	Games (Goals)
2007–2008	Adelaide	8 (1)
- ^{1} Playing statistics correct to the end of 2008.

Bryce Campbell (born 7 September 1984) is an Australian rules footballer who played with Adelaide in the Australian Football League (AFL).

Campbell was already 22 by the time he made his AFL debut in 2007. He came from Wagga Wagga originally and spent three seasons at South Australian National Football League (SANFL) Norwood before getting picked up in the 2006 National Draft. An ankle injury kept him out of action for the first half of the 2007 season. In 2008 he made seven senior appearances. He was delisted at the end of the season.

He is the son of former South Melbourne player Russell Campbell.
