= Jonathon Griffin =

Australian rules footballer (born 1986)

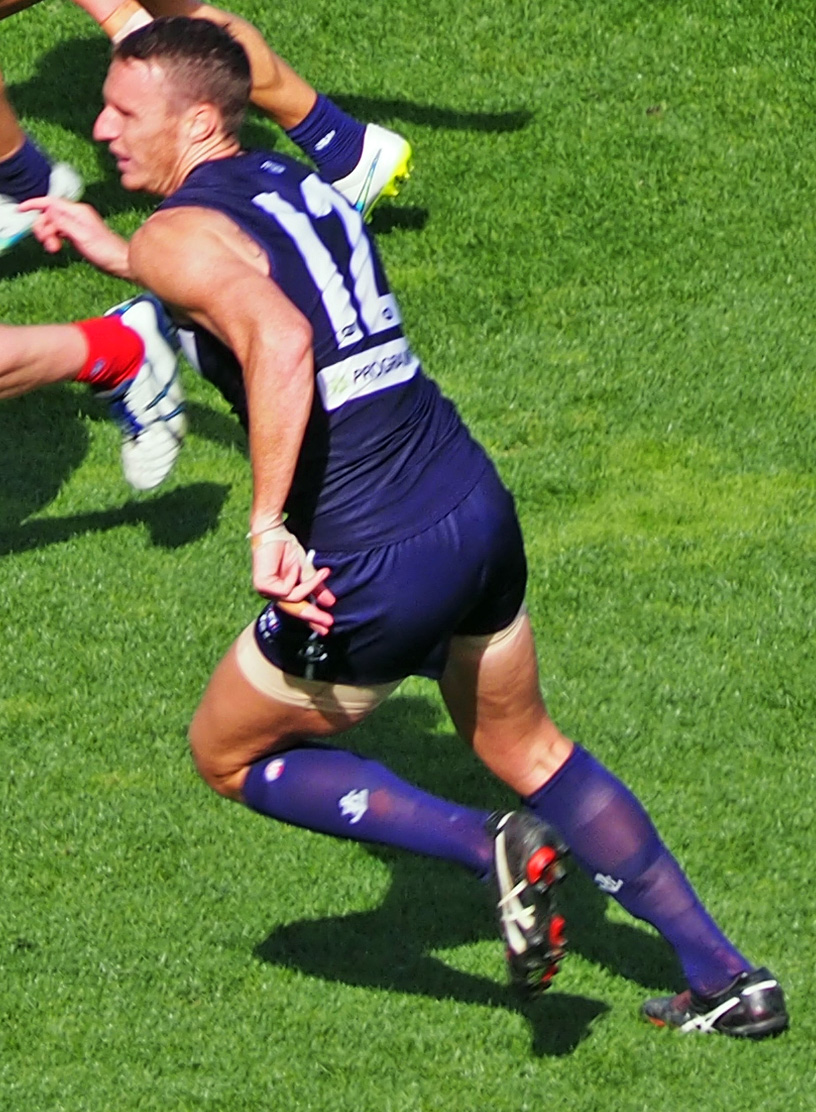
- Griffin playing with Fremantle in 2015

Personal information
- Full name: Jonathon Dean Griffin
- Born: 14 January 1986 (age 40); Western Australia
- Original team: Karoonda JFC
- Draft: No. 21, 2005 rookie draft
- Height: 201 cm (6 ft 7 in)
- Weight: 101 kg (223 lb)
- Position: Ruckman

Playing career^{1}
Years	Club	Games (Goals)
2006–2010	Adelaide	41 (7)
2011–2017	Fremantle	56 (29)
Total		97 (36)

Representative team honours^{2}
Years	Team	Games (Goals)
2009–2015	Indigenous All-Stars	2 (0)
- ^{1} Playing statistics correct to the end of 2017.^{2} Representative statistics correct as of 2015.

Career highlights
- Central District premiership side 2007; Peel Thunder premiership side 2016

Jonathon Dean Griffin (born 14 January 1986) is a former professional Australian rules footballer who played for the Adelaide Football Club and Fremantle Football Club in the Australian Football League (AFL). A ruckman from Western Australia, Griffin played for East Fremantle in the West Australian Football League (WAFL) before being drafted by Adelaide at the 2005 Rookie draft. Upgraded to the club's senior list for the 2007 season, he debuted the following season, and played 41 games for Adelaide before being traded to Fremantle during the 2010–11 trading period.

== Football career ==
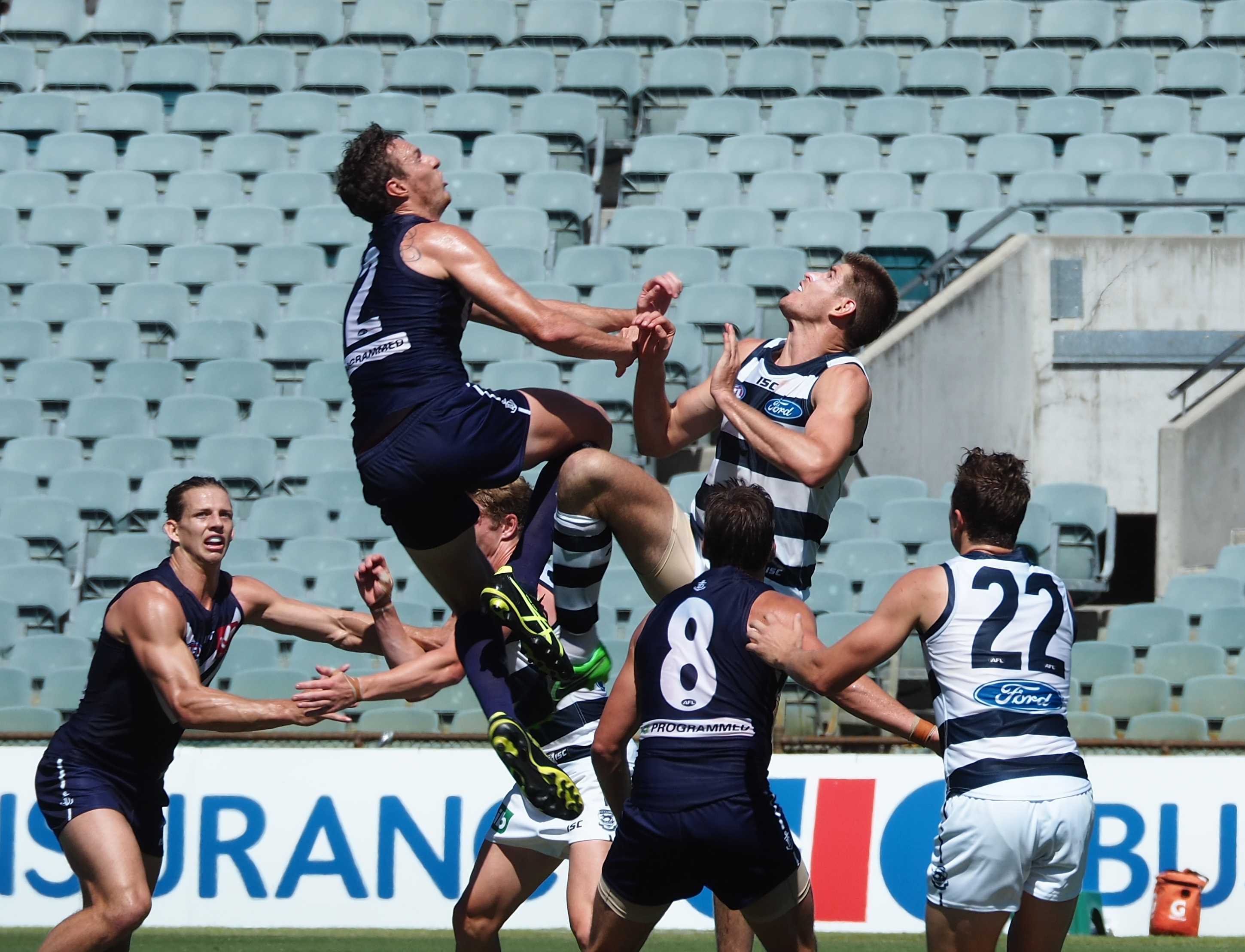
Griffin (#12) competing in a ruck contest in March 2016

Griffin was born in Bunbury, Western Australia. His family moved to the southern suburbs of Perth when he was 10 years old, and he attended Booragoon Primary School and Applecross Senior High School, playing junior football for Karoonda JFC. He was drafted by Adelaide from East Fremantle in the West Australian Football League (WAFL) with the 21st selection in the 2005 Rookie draft and spent the 2005 season on the rookie list. He was upgraded to the senior list for the 2006 season but spent most of 2006 playing reserves for Central District Bulldogs. Griffin got his chance to make his AFL debut in the early rounds of 2007 due to the departure of Matthew Clarke and injuries to Rhett Biglands and Ivan Maric. Although he was recruited as a key-forward Griffin was required to play as a ruckman. Many thought Griffin was not yet ready to play at the highest level as a ruckman because of his lanky figure, however Griffin managed to hold his spot for the first 13 rounds of 2007 before being replaced by the returning Maric.

Griffin started well in the 2008 AFL season, with strong performances against very good ruck opponents in Will Minson and Ben Hudson, of the Western Bulldogs, Dean Cox and Mark Seaby of the West Coast Eagles and Dean Brogan and Brendon Lade of Port Adelaide. In the 2009 season, Griffin only played 2 games for the Crows, with Maric and Kurt Tippett preferred as the main ruckman with James Sellar and Brad Moran also selected ahead of Griffin.

Through his maternal grandfather's Bibbulman ancestry, Griffin is descended from the Noongar people of south-western Australia. He was selected for the Indigenous All-Stars team in 2009.

Since returning to his home state of Western Australia, Griffin has been used mainly as Fremantle's backup ruckman, competing with Zac Clarke and Aaron Sandilands for the ruck positions. Griffin played his first game for the Dockers in round 10 of the 2011 AFL season against St Kilda, after Sandilands was unavailable due to injury. A career-best performance against Gold Coast in round 15 saw him collect 26 disposals, 9 marks, 30 hit outs and 2 goals. He played the first seven games of the 2013 season before damaging his anterior cruciate ligament (ACL), with the resultant knee reconstruction ruling him out for the rest of the season. He resumed his career in April 2014, through Fremantle's new affiliate team in the WAFL, Peel Thunder. Jonathon played in Peel's maiden WAFL premiership in 2016 but missed out in 2017, with a knee injury keeping him out of the Grand Final team.

Griffin was delisted by Fremantle at the conclusion of the 2017 season.

After being delisted by Fremantle, Jonathon returned to the WAFL in 2018 and was named captain of East Fremantle after having signed a two-year deal with the club.

After three seasons with East Fremantle, Griffin announced he would be retiring at the end of the 2020 season.

== Statistics ==
Statistics are correct to the end of the 2017 season

Legend
G	Goals	K	Kicks	D	Disposals	T	Tackles
B	Behinds	H	Handballs	M	Marks	H/O	Hit-outs

Season	Team	No.	Games	Totals								Averages (per game)							
Season	Team	No.	Games	G	B	K	H	D	M	T	H/O	G	B	K	H	D	M	T	H/O
2007	Adelaide	6	16	4	3	68	28	96	42	16	142	0.2	0.2	4.2	1.8	6.0	2.6	1.0	8.9
2008	Adelaide	6	12	1	3	40	55	95	29	17	202	0.1	0.2	3.3	4.6	7.9	2.4	1.4	16.8
2009	Adelaide	6	2	0	1	9	8	17	5	4	28	0.0	0.5	4.5	4.0	8.5	2.5	2.0	14.0
2010	Adelaide	6	11	2	3	44	51	95	32	19	143	0.2	0.3	4.0	4.6	8.6	2.9	1.7	13.0
2011	Fremantle	12	7	4	0	59	40	99	26	24	187	0.6	0.0	8.4	5.7	14.1	3.7	3.4	26.7
2012	Fremantle	12	13	4	2	86	59	145	37	45	321	0.3	0.2	6.6	4.5	11.2	2.8	3.5	24.7
2013	Fremantle	12	7	3	3	46	31	77	19	23	154	0.4	0.4	6.6	4.4	11.0	2.7	3.3	22.0
2014	Fremantle	12	1	0	0	3	0	3	1	1	7	0.0	0.0	3.0	0.0	3.0	1.0	1.0	7.0
2015	Fremantle	12	8	9	1	38	36	74	23	18	90	1.1	0.1	4.8	4.5	9.2	2.9	2.2	11.2
2016	Fremantle	12	13	5	2	51	71	122	21	39	289	0.4	0.2	3.9	5.5	9.4	1.6	3.0	22.2
2017	Fremantle	12	7	4	2	40	25	65	20	30	186	0.6	0.3	5.7	3.6	9.3	2.9	4.3	26.6
Career			97	36	20	484	404	888	255	236	1749	0.4	0.2	5.0	4.2	9.1	2.6	2.4	18.0

== See also ==
- List of AFL debuts in 2007
- List of Adelaide Football Club players
- List of Fremantle Football Club players
