= Brennan Stack =

Australian rules footballer

Personal information
- Full name: Brennan Stack
- Born: 26 May 1988 (age 38)
- Original team: Perth (WAFL)
- Draft: No. 45, 2006 National Draft, Western Bulldogs
- Height: 184 cm (6 ft 0 in)
- Weight: 85 kg (187 lb)
- Position: Forward

Playing career^{1}
| Years | Club | Games (Goals) |
| 2007–2011 | Western Bulldogs | 21 (17) |

Representative team honours
| Years | Team | Games (Goals) |
| 2009 | Indigenous All-Stars | 1 |
- ^{1} Playing statistics correct to the end of 2011.

Brennan Stack (born 26 May 1988) is a former Australian rules footballer who played for the Western Bulldogs in the Australian Football League from 2007 to 2011. On 21 March 2022, he was charged after an assault on multiple women in Perth which left them with serious head and facial injuries. On 6 September 2022, he was sentenced to three years imprisonment for the crime.

Stack nominated for the 2006 AFL National Draft. He was selected by the Bulldogs in the 3rd Round, #45 overall.

He made his debut for the Bulldogs in a 68-point win against Richmond in Round 11, 2009.

He played his second game in Round 18 in a win against Fremantle, he was among the Bulldogs best, kicking 4 goals, drawing comparisons to Liam Jurrah

Stack, one of the club's Aboriginal players, was exciting to watch with exceptional skills, but ultimately played no more than 21 games, the Bulldogs failing to find a spot for him on their list for the 2012 AFL season.

He was delisted by the Western Bulldogs at the conclusion of the 2011 AFL season.
