= Matthew O'Dwyer =

Australian rules footballer

Personal information
- Born: 21 July 1988 (age 38)
- Original team: Calder Cannons (Vic U/18)
- Debut: 2008, Sydney vs. Richmond, at Melbourne Cricket Ground, Melbourne
- Height: 195 cm (6 ft 5 in)
- Weight: 74 kg (163 lb)

Playing career^{1}
| Years | Club | Games (Goals) |
| 2008–2010 | Sydney Swans | 7 (1) |
- ^{1} Playing statistics correct to the end of 2010.

Matthew O'Dwyer (born 21 July 1988) is an Australian rules footballer who played with the Sydney Swans in the Australian Football League, among other teams.

== Sydney Swans ==
Formerly of the Calder Cannons in the TAC Cup, O'Dwyer was picked as a rookie in the 2007 Rookie Draft at number 30, but was delisted at the end of the year without making senior debut. He was redrafted by Sydney with the tenth selection in the 2008 Rookie Draft.

O'Dwyer, of Filipino descent, was promoted to the senior list towards the end of 2008, and managed two games before the season's end.

In 2009, O'Dwyer struggled to break into the senior side until towards the middle of the year when his consistency in the reserves led him to be selected to play the last four games of the season. He continued his form into 2010, being named as one of the Swans' best players in their one-point loss to St Kilda in the 2010 NAB Cup.

In 2010, O'Dwyer played only one game in the senior side and was delisted at the end of the season.

== VFL and NEAFL ==
In 2011 and 2012 O'Dwyer played in the VFL for the Werribee Tigers before moving to Eastlake for the 2013 NEAFL season. In 2014 he made the NEAFL Team of the Year whilst playing for Sydney Uni.
