= Mitch Brown (footballer, born 1988) =

Australian rules footballer (born 1988)

Personal information
- Full name: Mitchell Brown
- Born: 17 December 1988 (age 37); Upper Ferntree Gully
- Original team: Ballarat Football Club/North Ballarat Rebels
- Draft: No. 16, 2006 national draft
- Height: 197 cm (6 ft 6 in)
- Weight: 95 kg (209 lb)
- Position: Defender

Playing career
Years	Club	Games (Goals)
2007–2016	West Coast	94 (13)

Career highlights
- Rising Star nominee: 2009; Chris Mainwaring Medal: 2012

Mitchell Brown (born 17 December 1988) is a former professional Australian rules footballer who played for the West Coast Eagles in the Australian Football League (AFL). In August 2025, Brown came out publicly as bisexual, becoming the AFL's first openly bisexual past or present player.

Originally from Ballarat, Victoria, he played under-18 football for the North Ballarat Rebels in the TAC Cup before being recruited by West Coast with the 16th pick overall in the 2006 National Draft. He made his debut for West Coast in round one of the 2007 season, and played a total of 94 games for the club, alternating between defence and the forward line. Brown's career has been interrupted by injuries, causing him to miss the entire 2008 season and 2015 season, as well as significant parts of the 2010 and 2011 seasons.

== Career ==
Brown was born on 17 December 1988 in Upper Ferntree Gully and later moved to Ballarat. He attended St Patrick's College in Ballarat, and played junior football for the Ballarat Football and Netball Club, and under-18s for the North Ballarat Rebels in the TAC Cup, as a key forward. Brown was selected by the West Coast Eagles with pick 16 in the 2006 National Draft.

Brown made his debut for the West Coast Eagles in Round 1 of the 2007 season against the Sydney Swans, in a rematch of the 2006 AFL Grand Final. He played five games in his debut season, playing in both in the forward and back lines. He missed the entire 2008 season because of a knee reconstruction, before rebounding to play 19 games in 2009, including winning a Rising Star Award nomination in Round 19 against the Western Bulldogs.

Brown played 13 games in the 2010 season, being dropped three times. He played in the forward line for much of the first half of the season, but was in and out of form. He found a role as the Eagles' centre half-back towards the end of the season, becoming one of their better players in defence, before his season was ended by a groin injury.

At the conclusion of the 2016 season, Brown announced he had signed with St Kevin's Old Boys Football Club in the VAFA after he was delisted by West Coast after failing to facilitate a trade to a Victorian club during the trade period. He played 48 games for St Kevin’s from 2017-2019 and was part of two premier division premierships.

== Personal life ==
Brown's twin brother, Nathan Brown, played football for St Kilda in the AFL, and was a part of Collingwood's 2010 premiership win. His former wife, Shae Bolton Brown (née Bolton), was a professional netball player.

In August 2025, Brown came out publicly as bisexual, becoming the AFL's first openly bisexual past or present player. Before his coming out, the AFL was the only major professional men's sport league worldwide to have never had an openly bisexual or gay past or present player. Brown revealed that the weight of hiding his sexuality had taken its toll on his AFL career, where homophobic insults and conversations were commonplace on and off the field.

== Statistics ==
Statistics correct to the end of 2016

Legend
G	Goals	K	Kicks	D	Disposals	T	Tackles
B	Behinds	H	Handballs	M	Marks

Season	Team	No.	Games	Totals							Averages (per game)						
Season	Team	No.	Games	G	B	K	H	D	M	T	G	B	K	H	D	M	T
2007	West Coast	1	5	2	3	33	17	50	25	4	0.4	0.6	6.6	3.4	10.0	5.0	0.8
2008	West Coast	1	0	0	0	0	0	0	0	0	0.0	0.0	0.0	0.0	0.0	0.0	0.0
2009	West Coast	1	19	4	1	104	176	280	86	32	0.2	0.1	5.5	9.2	14.7	4.5	1.7
2010	West Coast	1	13	4	5	77	101	178	43	24	0.3	0.4	5.9	7.8	13.7	3.3	1.8
2011	West Coast	1	6	0	0	39	23	62	14	10	0.0	0.0	6.5	3.8	10.3	2.3	1.7
2012	West Coast	1	8	0	0	26	43	69	22	8	0.0	0.0	3.2	5.4	8.6	2.8	1.0
2013	West Coast	1	19	0	2	83	105	188	55	44	0.0	0.1	4.4	5.5	9.9	2.9	2.3
2014	West Coast	1	19	3	1	87	95	182	50	41	0.2	0.1	4.6	5.0	9.6	2.6	2.2
2015	West Coast	1	1	0	0	0	2	2	0	0	0.0	0.0	0.0	2.0	2.0	0.0	0.0
2016	West Coast	1	4	1	1	13	20	33	6	14	0.3	0.3	3.3	5.0	8.3	1.5	3.5
Career			94	14	13	462	582	1044	301	177	0.2	0.1	4.9	6.2	11.1	3.2	1.9
