= Scott Gumbleton =

Australian rules footballer

Personal information
- Full name: Scott Gumbleton
- Born: 3 August 1988 (age 38)
- Original team: Peel Thunder Football Club (WAFL)
- Draft: No. 2, 2006 National Draft, Essendon
- Height: 197 cm (6 ft 6 in)
- Weight: 99 kg (218 lb)
- Position: Forward

Playing career^{1}
Years	Club	Games (Goals)
2007–2013	Essendon	35 (45)
2014	Fremantle	0 (0)
Total		35 (45)
- ^{1} Playing statistics correct to the end of 2014.

Scott Gumbleton (born 3 August 1988) is a former Australian rules footballer who played for the Essendon and Fremantle Football Clubs in the Australian Football League (AFL).

== Early career ==
He was drafted by Essendon with the second selection in the 2006 AFL draft. Prior to the Draft, Gumbleton was widely seen as one of the top key position players for his age group, and was expected to be Essendon's first pick in the number 2 spot. As a natural centre half-forward player, Gumbleton's imposing figure places him in the immediate spotlight, with North Melbourne recruiting manager Neville Stibbard already talking of an upcoming rivalry between Gumbleton and the third draft pick of the same year, Lachlan Hansen, who has been described as a natural centre half-back.

== AFL career ==
Gumbleton's 2007, 2008 and 2009 seasons were all plagued by injury and he played only five AFL games in first three seasons, all of which were in 2007. However, the 2010 season saw much improvement for Gumbleton, having a full pre-season, playing 17 of the first 18 games and being re-signed by Essendon, after showing much improvement. Gumbleton suffered yet another injury in round 18, with broken ribs and a punctured lung, ruling him out for the remainder of the 2010 season. Scott's 2011 season was again plagued by injury and he failed to play any games at AFL level. At the end of 2011 Scott had back surgery to repair a disk. It was hoped the surgery would fix his chronic hamstring issues. In 2012 Scott played his first senior game in nearly two years when he returned against Port Adelaide in round 16, booting three goals. He finished the 2012 season having played six games kicking 11 goals. Despite having long-term offers from rival clubs at the end of 2012 Gumbleton showed his loyalty to Essendon agreeing to a new one-year deal to remain at the club until at least the end of 2013.

In October 2013, Gumbleton was recruited by Fremantle, who traded the 55th selection in the 2013 AFL draft to Essendon.

After failing to play a senior game in his one season at Fremantle, Gumbleton announced his retirement in September 2014. He returned to Melbourne to play for the Banyule Football Club in the Northern Football League from 2015.

Gumbleton, along with 33 other Essendon players, was found guilty of using a banned performance-enhancing substance, thymosin beta-4, as part of Essendon's sports supplements program during the 2012 season. He and his team-mates were initially found not guilty in March 2015 by the AFL Anti-Doping Tribunal, but a guilty verdict was returned in January 2016 after an appeal by the World Anti-Doping Agency. He was suspended for two years which, with backdating, ended in November 2016; as a result, he served approximately fourteen months of his suspension and missed the entire 2016 season with Banyule.

== Statistics ==
Legend
G	Goals	K	Kicks	D	Disposals	T	Tackles
B	Behinds	H	Handballs	M	Marks

Season	Team	No.	Games	Totals							Averages (per game)						
Season	Team	No.	Games	G	B	K	H	D	M	T	G	B	K	H	D	M	T
2007	Essendon	3	5	3	1	19	22	41	26	4	0.6	0.2	3.8	4.4	8.2	5.2	0.8
2008	Essendon	3	0	0	0	0	0	0	0	0	0	0	0	0	0	0	0
2009	Essendon	3	0	0	0	0	0	0	0	0	0	0	0	0	0	0	0
2010	Essendon	3	17	19	12	102	71	173	84	31	1.1	0.7	6.0	4.2	10.2	4.9	1.8
2011	Essendon	3	0	0	0	0	0	0	0	0	0	0	0	0	0	0	0
2012	Essendon	3	6	11	4	35	23	58	24	8	1.8	0.7	5.8	3.8	9.7	4.0	1.3
2013	Essendon	3	7	12	6	38	29	67	37	9	1.7	0.9	5.4	4.1	9.6	5.3	1.3
2014	Fremantle	19	0	—	—	—	—	—	—	—	—	—	—	—	—	—	—
Career			35	45	23	194	145	339	171	52	1.3	0.7	5.5	4.1	9.7	4.9	1.5
