= Tom Williams (Australian footballer, born 1986) =

Australian rules footballer

Personal information
- Born: 17 July 1986 (age 40)
- Original team: Morningside (QAFL)
- Draft: No. 6, 2004 National Draft, Western Bulldogs
- Height: 198 cm (6 ft 6 in)
- Weight: 100 kg (220 lb)
- Position: Defender

Playing career^{1}
Years	Club	Games (Goals)
2007–2014	Western Bulldogs	85 (14)
- ^{1} Playing statistics correct to the end of 2014.

Career highlights
- 2007 AFL Rising Star nominee

Tom Williams (born 17 July 1986) is a former Australian rules footballer with the Western Bulldogs in the Australian Football League. Drafted with the 6th pick in the 2004 AFL draft, Williams was a late convert to Australian Rules, having been an all-round sportsman, playing representative rugby union for Queensland in U-18s. Williams retired in 2014.

Tom's father Steve played for the Parramatta Eels in the New South Wales Rugby League between 1975 and 1976 and was a co-founder of the Brisbane Broncos.

Williams was identified as a talent by Mark Browning, former Sydney Swan turned AFL Queensland talent manager. He was rushed into the 2004 Under 18 championships having played just 15 games of Australian rules football, from which he was taken as the Bulldogs first round pick in the draft.

Despite having broken his ankle three times since joining the club, Williams has shown promise of becoming a key position defender, giving the club plenty of reason to keep him on the list.

Williams made his debut against Richmond in round four of the 2007 AFL season where the Bulldogs registered a victory against Richmond. Willams played well enough to earn a NAB Rising Star nomination in round 18.

== Statistics ==
Legend
G	Goals	K	Kicks	D	Disposals	T	Tackles
B	Behinds	H	Handballs	M	Marks

Season	Team	No.	Games	Totals							Averages (per game)						
Season	Team	No.	Games	G	B	K	H	D	M	T	G	B	K	H	D	M	T
2007	Western Bulldogs	12	13	0	1	73	67	140	64	21	0.0	0.1	5.6	5.2	10.8	4.9	1.6
2008	Western Bulldogs	12	6	1	1	31	30	61	27	12	0.2	0.2	5.2	5.0	10.2	4.5	2.0
2009	Western Bulldogs	12	14	0	0	84	65	149	52	13	0.0	0.0	6.0	4.6	10.6	3.7	0.9
2010	Western Bulldogs	12	23	1	2	142	117	259	103	31	0.0	0.1	6.2	5.1	11.3	4.5	1.3
2011	Western Bulldogs	12	17	2	2	123	66	189	59	25	0.1	0.1	7.2	3.9	11.1	3.5	1.5
2012	Western Bulldogs	12	3	3	3	25	14	39	18	3	1.0	1.0	8.3	4.7	13.0	6.0	1.0
2013	Western Bulldogs	12	2	1	2	8	8	16	5	2	0.5	1.0	4.0	4.0	8.0	2.5	1.0
2014	Western Bulldogs	12	7	6	1	48	26	74	28	7	0.9	0.1	6.9	3.7	10.6	4.0	1.0
Career			85	14	12	534	393	927	356	114	0.2	0.1	6.3	4.6	10.9	4.2	1.3

== Victoria Harbour incident ==
On 4 October 2007, Williams and fellow team member Daniel Cross leaped into the water of Victoria Harbour in Hong Kong to rescue a woman attempting to commit suicide. The woman did not want to be saved. They hauled her to safety after hearing bystanders screaming for help. When they emerged from the harbour they both had minor bruises and cuts. Both were reported to be in good spirits after the incident.

Following the incident, both Williams and Cross were awarded certificates of commendation by Hong Kong's Director of Marine.
