= Ross Young (footballer) =

Australian rules footballer (born 1983)

Personal information
- Full name: Ross Young
- Born: 9 September 1983 (age 43)
- Original team: Bendigo Pioneers
- Draft: 35th overall, 2007 Rookie Draft (Carlton)
- Height: 178 cm (5 ft 10 in)
- Weight: 76 kg (168 lb)
- Position: Midfielder

Club information
- Current club: Richmond

Playing career^{1}
Years	Club	Games (Goals)
2004–07	Northern Bullants	46 (34)
2007	Carlton	6 (3)
2008–12	Perth	87 (71)
2014	Richmond (VFL)	18 (8)

Representative team honours
Years	Team	Games (Goals)
2008–10	Western Australia	3 (1)
- ^{1} Playing statistics correct to the end of 2014.

Career highlights
- University Blues premiership 2004; University Blues best and fairest 2004; Sandover Medal; Winner 2009; Third place 2008; Perth best and fairest 2009, 2011, 2012; Perth captain 2012; VAFA International rules captain, 2013; University Blues best and fairest 2013; Richmond VFL team captain 2014; Richmond VFL best and fairest 2014; Woodrow Medal 2015; University Blues best and fairest 2015

Ross Young (born 9 September 1983) is an Australian rules footballer. He is most notable for his time at the Perth Football Club in the West Australian Football League (WAFL), where he served as captain and won a Sandover Medal. He had a brief career in the Australian Football League with the Carlton Football Club.

== Career ==
Originally from Donald, Victoria, Young played under-18s football for the Bendigo Pioneers in the TAC Cup in 2001. Following this, Young played amateur football for three years with the University Blues in the VAFA, winning a flag and a best and fairest award with the Blues in 2004. From there, Young shifted to the Northern Bullants in the Victorian Football League in 2005, playing there for two seasons and gaining a regular place in the Bullants' seniors in 2006.

Carlton, the Bullants' Australian Football League affiliate, selected Young as a rookie with its third round selection (the 35th pick overall) in the 2007 Rookie Draft, held before the beginning of the 2007 regular season. Young, at 23 years old, was the first player to be selected under new rules where older players could be rookie listed if they had never been through an AFL club system. Being selected by Carlton was a dream come true for Young, as he had always been an unabashed fan of former Carlton great Peter "Percy" Jones. He was elevated from the rookie list before Round 6 of that year as a replacement for Nick Stevens, making his debut against St Kilda. Young played six games for Carlton throughout his only season at the AFL club, and was delisted at the end of the year.

Young then moved to Western Australia to play with Perth in the WAFL, where he had a distinguished WAFL career. He won the 2009 Sandover Medal after finishing third in 2008. He won the Butcher Medal as the club's best and fairest player in 2009 and 2011, and represented Western Australia in three interstate matches between 2008 and 2010. In February 2012, Young was named the captain of the Perth Football Club for the 2012 season, taking over from Steven Armstrong, who had retired.

Young left Perth at the end of 2012 to return to Melbourne. He returned to the University Blues for the 2013 season, and was captain of the VAFA representative team which underwent an International rules football series in Irelend in October 2013. In 2014, Young signed with the Richmond Football Club and served as the captain of its reserves team during its inaugural season in the Victorian Football League. He returned to University Blues in 2015, and was joint-winner of the 2015 Woodrow Medal as VAFA Premier Division best and fairest. He remained with the Blues until the end of the 2019 season, and retired prior to the resumption of amateur football in 2021 after the COVID-19 pandemic.

Young is the cousin of Collingwood's Clinton Young, and his younger brother Seamus also played with Ross at Perth.
