= Brad Howard =

Australian rules footballer (born 1987)

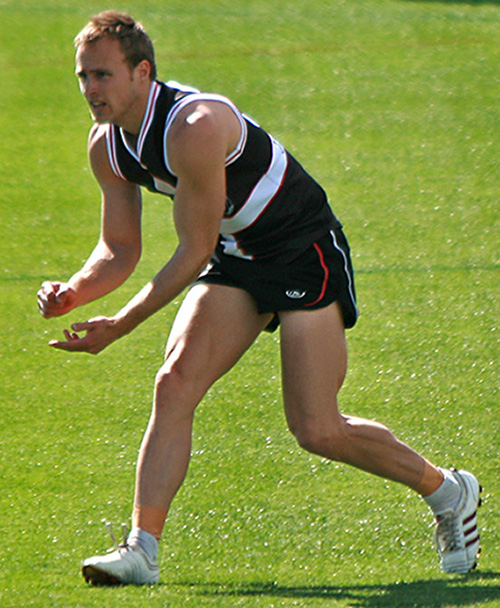

Personal information
- Born: 21 December 1987 (age 38); Queensland
- Original team: Redland (AFLQ)
- Debut: Round 8, 10 June 2007, St Kilda vs. North Melbourne, at Docklands Stadium
- Height: 180 cm (5 ft 11 in)
- Weight: 71 kg (157 lb)

Playing career^{1}
Years	Club	Games (Goals)
2007	St Kilda	2 (0)
- ^{1} Playing statistics correct to the end of 2007.

Brad Howard (born 21 December 1987) is an Australian rules footballer who played for the St Kilda Football Club in the Australian Football League (AFL).

== AFL career ==
Howard, from Toowoomba, was drafted by St Kilda with their second pick in the 2006 AFL draft and made his debut for the club in Round 8 of the 2007 season. The Saints, decimated by injuries at the time, were forced to select Howard, although he had shown promising form in the Victorian Football League. Howard now plays for Redland Bombers in the NEAFL (North East Australian Football League), floating across Half back. He also works for the NEAFL in the Operations department.
