= Scott McMahon =

Australian rules footballer

Personal information
- Full name: Scott McMahon
- Born: 2 June 1986 (age 40); Yorke Peninsula, South Australia
- Original team: Woodville-West Torrens (SANFL)
- Height: 184 cm (6 ft 0 in)
- Weight: 86 kg (190 lb)
- Position: Defender

Club information
- Current club: Sturt FC

Playing career^{1}
| Years | Club | Games (Goals) |
| 2007–2015 | North Melbourne(AFL) | 124 (28) |
| 2016–2017 | Sturt(SANFL) | 5 (0) |
| 2018-2023 | Imperials(RMFL) | 0 (1) |
- ^{1} Playing statistics correct to the end of 2015.

Career highlights
- 2007 AFL Rising Star nominee

Scott McMahon (born 2 June 1986) is a former professional Australian rules footballer who played for the North Melbourne Football Club in the Australian Football League (AFL).

McMahon played for Woodville-West Torrens Football Club in the South Australian National Football League (SANFL) before being rookie-listed at draft pick number 38 by North Melbourne at the 2005 AFL Rookie Draft. McMahon spent all of the 2005 AFL season playing for North Melbourne's then Victorian Football League's (VFL's) affiliate Port Melbourne Football Club and the 2006 AFL season playing for the Tasmanian Devils Football Club following North Melbourne's decision to change affiliates.

McMahon was elevated off the rookie list permanently at the start of the 2007 AFL season and made his senior debut against Carlton Football Club in Round Eight, collecting 13 disposals. McMahon was soon dropped back to the VFL and was included as an emergency for North Melbourne several times before he returned to the seniors for the Round 13 clash against the Western Bulldogs. In that match he kicked two goals and was rated "one of the Roos' rising midfielders" by the media. He played the next week against Richmond Football Club and again kicked two goals, matching his previous week's performance. McMahon was rated by then North Melbourne coach Dean Laidley as "the best young player we got for nothing". For his performance in that game, he won the Round 14 AFL Rising Star nomination.

He was delisted at the conclusion of the 2015 season.
