= Andrejs Everitt =

Australian rules footballer (born 1989)

Personal information
- Full name: Andrejs Everitt
- Born: 13 March 1989 (age 37)
- Original team: Dandenong Stingrays (TAC Cup)
- Draft: No. 11, 2006 national draft
- Height: 194 cm (6 ft 4 in)
- Weight: 89 kg (196 lb)
- Position: Utility

Playing career^{1}
Years	Club	Games (Goals)
2007–2010	Western Bulldogs	36 (8)
2011–2013	Sydney	43 (24)
2014–2016	Carlton	52 (61)
Total		131 (93)
- ^{1} Playing statistics correct to the end of 2016.

Career highlights
- Carlton leading goalkicker: 2015

Andrejs Everitt (born 13 March 1989) is a former professional Australian rules footballer who played for the Western Bulldogs, Sydney Swans and Carlton Football Club in the Australian Football League (AFL). He is the younger brother of former St Kilda, Hawthorn and Sydney player Peter Everitt.

Everitt was picked in the 2006 AFL draft at pick 11 from the Dandenong Stingrays. At the end of the 2007 AFL season, Andrejs was given Chris Grant's old No. 3 guernsey on Grant's insistence, although the club had contemplated retiring the number.

At the end of the 2010 season, Everitt was traded to the Sydney Swans, in return for Patrick Veszpremi and a late round draft selection.

In Round 3, Everitt stamped himself as a Swans player, leading the team to victory over the West Coast Eagles with 2 crucial goals in the last quarter.

Everitt also kicked one of the most famous goals at the SCG vs Geelong Cats. with less than a minute to go he kicked a goal from fifty right on the boundary to win it for the Swans.

At the end of the 2013 season, Everitt was traded to the Carlton Football Club. He spent three seasons with Carlton, playing a total of 52 games. He finished as the club's leading goalkicker in 2015 with 31 goals, but struggled with form in 2016 and was delisted in October. He subsequently announced his retirement from AFL football in November.

Everitt returned to play and co-coach at Somerville in the Mornington Peninsula Nepean Football League, his local club when he was a junior, in 2017.

== Personal life ==
Everitt is one of six children, including older brother Peter, born to Anda (née Tiltins) and Peter Everitt. The siblings are of Latvian descent through their mother. Their maternal grandfather Raimond Tiltins was a member of the Latvian Legion during World War II, before immigrating to Australia in 1948. Their paternal grandfather Phillip Everitt was born in England and was sent to Australia as part of the Home Children scheme.

== Statistics ==
Legend
G	Goals	K	Kicks	D	Disposals	T	Tackles
B	Behinds	H	Handballs	M	Marks

Season	Team	No.	Games	Totals							Averages (per game)							Votes
Season	Team	No.	Games	G	B	K	H	D	M	T	G	B	K	H	D	M	T	Votes
2007	Western Bulldogs	29	8	4	4	66	43	109	33	14	0.5	0.5	8.3	5.4	13.6	4.1	1.8	0
2008	Western Bulldogs	3	9	0	0	71	41	112	33	15	0.0	0.0	7.9	4.6	12.4	3.7	1.7	0
2009	Western Bulldogs	3	7	1	2	50	40	90	30	13	0.1	0.3	7.1	5.7	12.9	4.3	1.9	0
2010	Western Bulldogs	3	12	3	5	102	90	192	69	28	0.3	0.4	8.5	7.5	16.0	5.8	2.3	0
2011	Sydney	13	11	8	5	66	28	94	40	18	0.7	0.5	6.0	2.5	8.5	3.6	1.6	0
2012	Sydney	13	12	9	8	66	50	116	17	25	0.8	0.7	5.5	4.2	9.7	1.4	2.1	0
2013	Sydney	13	20	7	3	169	139	308	78	37	0.4	0.2	8.5	7.0	15.4	3.9	1.9	0
2014	Carlton	33	17	13	7	160	126	286	89	38	0.8	0.4	9.4	7.4	16.8	5.2	2.2	3
2015	Carlton	33	22	31	20	225	109	334	132	30	1.4	0.9	10.2	5.0	15.2	6.0	1.4	0
2016	Carlton	33	13	17	8	99	81	180	67	17	1.3	0.6	7.6	6.2	13.8	5.2	1.3	2
Career			131	93	62	1074	747	1821	588	235	0.7	0.5	8.2	5.7	13.9	4.5	1.8	5
