= Clayton Collard =

Australian rules footballer

Personal information
- Full name: Clayton Collard
- Born: 4 December 1988 (age 37); Western Australia
- Original team: South Fremantle (WAFL)
- Draft: 31st overall, 2006; Fremantle; 1st overall, 2008 Rookie draft Richmond
- Height: 182 cm (6 ft 0 in)
- Weight: 86 kg (190 lb)
- Position: Forward pocket/Midfielder

Playing career^{1}
Years	Club	Games (Goals)
2007	Fremantle	1 (1)
2008	Richmond	0 (0)
Total		1 (1)
- ^{1} Playing statistics correct to the end of 2008.

Clayton Collard (born 4 December 1988) is an Australian rules footballer. He plays as a midfielder or small forward and was selected by the Fremantle Football Club with selection 31 in the 2006 AFL National draft. He was rookie listed by the Richmond Football Club in the 2007 Rookie Draft at pick 1. In August 2008 he was delisted from the Richmond Football Club.

Collard spent the 2006 season playing for the South Fremantle Football Club in the West Australian Football League. He represented Western Australia in the national under-18 championships and is a graduate of the AIS/AFL academy.

Clayton made his debut for the Fremantle Dockers against St Kilda in Round 9, 2007. This was extra special being the first game of the inaugural Indigenous Round. He was given the opportunity due to good form in the WAFL for South Fremantle and Jeff Farmer, an idol and mentor of Collard, being suspended by Fremantle .

On 22 October 2007 Clayton Collard was delisted by the Fremantle Football Club. He was then selected by Richmond in the 2008 Rookie draft, but was delisted at the end of the 2008 season, having spent the year playing for Coburg Football Club in the Victorian Football League (VFL), without making his debut for Richmond. After having a year away from football, in 2010 Collard returned to Western Australia and joined Peel Thunder.
