= Michael Jamison =

Australian rules footballer

Personal information
- Full name: Michael Jamison
- Born: 11 June 1986 (age 40)
- Original team: North Ballarat (VFL)
- Draft: No. 17, 2007 Rookie draft, Carlton
- Height: 193 cm (6 ft 4 in)
- Weight: 96 kg (212 lb)
- Position: Defender

Playing career^{1}
Years	Club	Games (Goals)
2007–2016	Carlton	150 (2)
- ^{1} Playing statistics correct to the end of 2016.

Career highlights
- Carlton best clubman 2010

Michael Jamison (born 11 June 1986) is a former professional Australian rules footballer who played for the Carlton Football Club in the Australian Football League (AFL).

Jamison is a key defender, particularly good against leading players, who has played for several years at the North Ballarat Football Club, with his under-18s football at the North Ballarat Rebels, and then reserves and seniors with the Roosters. Jamison was invited to train with the Carlton Football Club in the 2006/07 offseason, presumably on advice from Carlton assistant coach and outgoing Roosters head coach Gavin Crosisca. Carlton then selected Jamison as a rookie with their second selection in the 2007 AFL rookie draft (17th pick overall).

As a rookie, Jamison began the 2007 season playing with Carlton's VFL-affiliate, the Northern Bullants. After the retirement of Anthony Koutoufides, Jamison was promoted to the senior list and made a successful senior debut against Collingwood in Round 18. He began 2008 as a nominated rookie. Throughout the season, he played primarily on the opposition's best leading forward, often due to injuries to other key defenders. In Round 8, he kept Daniel Bradshaw of the Brisbane Lions goalless (who was second in the running for the Coleman Medal at the time), before injuring his shoulder late in the game. Jamison played a total of sixteen games throughout the season, missing six through his shoulder injuries; he routinely tapes his shoulders for games.

At the end of 2008, Jamison was officially elevated to the senior list. In 2009, he continued to be a key member of Carlton's defence, before suffering a groin injury and missing the last month of the season. In 2010, Jamison was elevated to the club's leadership group, after playing only 34 games, and captained the side in Chris Judd's absence in his 37th game, in Round 3 2010 against Essendon. For the first time, he got through the season without injury, playing all 23 games, and won the Best Clubman Award for 2010.

Jamison had a breakthrough season in 2011, becoming proficient as both a defensive stopper and as a damaging rebounder. He became recognised as one of the league's top defenders, and commentators at mid-season were speculating that Jamison was a front-runner for the full-back position in the All-Australian Team; however, he missed most of the second half of the season with a torn meniscus.

On 8 August 2016, he announced his immediate retirement from the AFL.

Jamison studied a Commerce degree during his time at Carlton.

== Statistics ==
Legend
G	Goals	K	Kicks	D	Disposals	T	Tackles
B	Behinds	H	Handballs	M	Marks

Season	Team	No.	Games	Totals							Averages (per game)						
Season	Team	No.	Games	G	B	K	H	D	M	T	G	B	K	H	D	M	T
2007	Carlton	40	5	0	1	28	25	53	11	13	0.0	0.2	5.6	5.0	10.6	2.2	2.6
2008	Carlton	40	16	0	1	98	44	142	61	29	0.0	0.1	6.1	2.8	8.9	3.8	1.8
2009	Carlton	40	13	0	0	67	46	113	49	20	0.0	0.0	5.2	3.5	8.7	3.8	1.5
2010	Carlton	40	23	0	0	136	64	200	89	48	0.0	0.0	5.9	2.8	8.7	3.9	2.1
2011	Carlton	40	14	1	4	114	62	176	71	26	0.1	0.3	8.1	4.4	12.6	5.1	1.9
2012	Carlton	40	16	0	2	131	71	202	75	28	0.0	0.1	8.2	4.4	12.6	4.7	1.8
2013	Carlton	40	24	0	0	155	104	259	102	45	0.0	0.0	6.5	4.3	10.8	4.3	1.9
2014	Carlton	40	20	1	3	147	79	226	108	28	0.1	0.2	7.4	4.0	11.3	5.4	1.4
2015	Carlton	40	14	0	0	74	58	132	56	15	0.0	0.0	5.3	4.1	9.4	4.0	1.1
2016	Carlton	40	5	0	0	18	19	37	14	10	0.0	0.0	3.6	3.8	7.4	2.8	2.0
Career			150	2	11	968	572	1540	636	262	0.0	0.1	6.5	3.8	10.3	4.2	1.7
