= Cain Ackland =

Australian rules footballer

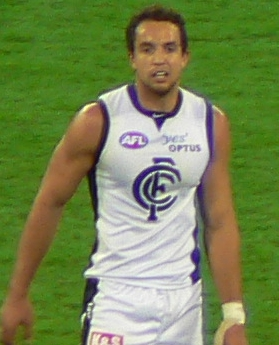

Personal information
- Full name: Cain Jed Ackland
- Born: 16 March 1982 (age 44)
- Original team: Port Adelaide Magpies (SANFL)
- Draft: 27th overall, 1999; Port Adelaide; 33rd overall, 2004; St Kilda; 1st overall, 2006 PSD; Carlton
- Height: 196 cm (6 ft 5 in)
- Weight: 100 kg (220 lb)
- Position: Ruckman

Playing career^{1}
Years	Club	Games (Goals)
2000–2004	Port Adelaide	12 (3)
2005–2006	St Kilda	41 (18)
2007–2008	Carlton	21 (4)
Total		74 (25)
- ^{1} Playing statistics correct to the end of 2008.

Career highlights
- Port Adelaide pre-season premiership side 2001; Carlton pre-season premiership side 2007

Cain Jed Ackland (born 16 March 1982) is an Australian rules footballer formerly in the Australian Football League (AFL).

Originally from South Australian National Football League (SANFL) club Port Adelaide Magpies, Ackland was drafted by Port Adelaide in the second round of the 1999 AFL draft. He made his AFL debut in 2001, playing twelve games but did not play another senior game for Port in three seasons and was delisted at the end of the 2004 AFL season.

St Kilda, who had a shortage of quality ruckman, especially following the departure of Trent Knobel, selected Ackland in the second round of the 2004 AFL draft. He played 22 games during the 2005 AFL season and earned the Rex Hunt nickname "The Street" in his commentary, in reference to the St Kilda nightspot Acland Street.

Out of contract with St Kilda at the end of 2006, Ackland joined Carlton with the club's first pick in the 2007 pre-season Draft. Ackland, who St Kilda had sought to retain, rejected St Kilda's two-year offer, accepting a three-year deal with Carlton.

In his first season with Carlton, Ackland assumed the top ruck position. While serviceable in the role, he often struggled to compete with the league's other top ruckmen and was briefly dropped on two occasions. By the start of 2008, Ackland was not considered among Carlton's top ruck selections and struggled for regular selection, playing only one game during the season. He moved to the forward-line at Carlton's VFL-affiliate, the Northern Bullants, where he kicked more than six goals in games several times during the year, but could not get back into the senior team. Ackland was delisted by Carlton at the end of the 2008 AFL season.

Ackland returned to South Australia in 2009 and joined North Adelaide in the SANFL; he played there for three seasons, retiring at the end of 2011. Ackland returned to amateur football in 2012, playing for Broadview in the South Australian Amateur Football League (SAAFL), then moved back to Victoria and played for Newtown & Chilwell in the Geelong Football League in 2013 and 2014.
