= Neville Stibbard (footballer, born 1923) =

Australian rules footballer

Personal information
- Full name: Neville J. Stibbard
- Born: 11 December 1923
- Died: 3 May 1994 (aged 70)
- Height: 188 cm (6 ft 2 in)
- Weight: 89 kg (196 lb)

Playing career^{1}
| Years | Club | Games (Goals) |
| 1946 | South Melbourne | 6 (2) |
| 1947–1948 | North Melbourne | 6 (1) |
| Total | | 12 (3) |
- ^{1} Playing statistics correct to the end of 1948.

Neville Stibbard (11 December 1923 – 3 May 1994) was an Australian rules footballer who played with South Melbourne and North Melbourne in the Victorian Football League (VFL).

== Biography ==
=== Career ===
Stibbard spent four years with the South Melbourne seconds before getting his chance at league football. A follower known for his high marking ability, Stibbard made six appearances for South Melbourne, early in the 1946 VFL season.

He was granted a clearance to Victorian Football Association club Oakleigh in June.

After playing out the year with Oakleigh, Stibbard returned to the VFL in 1947, as one of North Melbourne's new recruits. His debut for North Melbourne, in what was his only appearance of the 1947 season, was as a defender in North Melbourne's round six win over Essendon, in which they overcame a 44-point three quarter time margin. This remained a league record for biggest three quarter time comeback until it was surpassed in 1995. He played a further five games for North Melbourne, all in the 1948 season.

In 1949 he was coaching a West Brunswick junior side.

=== Later life ===
In 1955 he was fortunate to survive being buried alive in an accident at a quarry in Campbellfield, Victoria. One of three men at the bottom of the quarry when clay fell down on them, Stibbard was buried to the waist for 20-minutes until being rescued, but didn't suffer serious injuries. His brother-in-law, George McInnes, was killed in the accident.

He later served as a member of the South Melbourne committee.

Two twin sons, Neville and Robert, both played for South Melbourne in the 1970s.
