= Adam Cockshell =

Australian rules footballer

Personal information
- Full name: Adam Cockshell
- Born: 19 August 1986 (age 40)
- Original team: Norwood (SANFL)
- Draft: 4th overall, 2007 Pre-season Draft
- Height: 199 cm (6 ft 6 in)
- Weight: 102 kg (225 lb)
- Position: Forward/ruck

Club information
- Current club: Port Adelaide (SANFL)
- Number: 27

Playing career^{1}
Years	Club	Games (Goals)
2007–2008	Port Adelaide	2 (1)
- ^{1} Playing statistics correct to the end of 2013.

Adam Cockshell (born 19 August 1986) is a former professional Australian rules footballer who played for the Port Adelaide Football Club in the Australian Football League (AFL). He was recruited from South Australian National Football League (SANFL) club Norwood.

Cockshell played two games for Port Adelaide in 2007 before being delisted at the end of the 2008 AFL season. He then moved to SANFL club South Adelaide, playing his 100th SANFL game in South's 22-point win over his former club Norwood in round 23 of the 2011 SANFL season. In 2012 Cockshell moved back to Port Adelaide to play for their SANFL side.

In 2021, Cockshell was convicted of deception offences and was given a suspended jail sentence.
