= Brad Dick =

Australian rules footballer (born 1988)

Personal information
- Full name: Bradley Anthony Dick
- Born: 25 July 1988 (age 38); Western Australia
- Original team: East Fremantle (WAFL)
- Draft: No. 44, 2006 National Draft, Collingwood; No. 68, 2012 Rookie Draft, West Coast
- Height: 181 cm (5 ft 11 in)
- Weight: 81 kg (179 lb)
- Position: Midfielder / Forward

Playing career^{1}
Years	Club	Games (Goals)
2007–2011	Collingwood	27 (32)
2012–2013	West Coast	0 (0)
- ^{1} Playing statistics correct to the end of 2013.

Career highlights
- 2009 AFL Rising Star nominee

Bradley Anthony Dick (born 25 July 1988) is a former Australian rules footballer who played for the West Coast Eagles and the Collingwood Football Club in the Australian Football League (AFL).

A small, speedy wingman from Western Australia, Dick was selected by the Magpies with the 44th pick in the 2006 AFL draft. He made his AFL debut in round 3 of the 2007 AFL season, scoring 2 goals against the Richmond Tigers.

== AFL career ==
In 2007, Bradley Anthony Dick made his debut against Richmond. He played 6 games in his debut season.

Brad Dick missed the entire 2008 season following a knee injury he obtained in a pre-season practice match.

In 2009, he was selected as a nominee for the NAB AFL Rising Star following his 5-goal performance against the Melbourne Demons in the Queen's Birthday clash. He also had a career high 25 disposals against Port Adelaide.

A pre-season shoulder injury sidelined Dick for the early part of 2010. He managed just two games before re-injuring his shoulder, needing season ending surgery. He finished with four goals in the Queen's Birthday match against Melbourne.

Dick struggled for game time in 2011, following another injury. At the end of the 2011 season, he was delisted by Collingwood. In an attempt to reignite his AFL career, Dick relocated to his home state of Western Australia, where he was drafted by the West Coast Eagles with pick 61 in the rookie draft.

Dick did not play a game for the Eagles, and announced his retirement at the end of the 2013 season.
