= Garry Moss =

Australian rules footballer and coach

Personal information
- Born: 5 July 1988 (age 38)
- Original team: East Perth (WAFL)
- Draft: No. 56, 2006 national draft
- Debut: Round 7, 2007, Hawthorn vs. Fremantle, at Subiaco Oval
- Height: 181 cm (5 ft 11 in)
- Weight: 74 kg (163 lb)

Playing career^{1}
Years	Club	Games (Goals)
2007–2010	Hawthorn	14 (12)
- ^{1} Playing statistics correct to the end of 2010.

Garry Moss (born 5 July 1988) is an Australian rules football coach and former player who is the current coach of the Augusta-Margaret River Hawks in the South West Football League. As a player he played with the Hawthorn Football Club in the Australian Football League.

Moss attended Newman College, graduating in 2005. He is the great nephew of the 1970 Brownlow Medallist, Peter Bedford. Drafted by Hawthorn with 56th overall pick in the 2006 AFL draft from East Perth in the WAFL, he played as a midfielder and was on the Hawks' senior list for two seasons before being delisted, but then re-drafted at the end of the 2008 season.

After making his league debut in 2007, his 2008 season was wrecked by injuries, but he managed to play several games for Hawthorn's Victorian Football League (VFL) affiliate Box Hill Hawks. He then played his second AFL game against the Sydney Swans in round 2 of the 2009 AFL season. In Round 5 he was awarded the AFL Rising Star nomination following his four-goal and 24 possession performance against the West Coast Eagles.

In 2019 it was announced that Moss would succeed Earl Spalding as coach of the Perth Football Club from the 2021 WAFL season, following a season as assistant coach as part of a transition plan. His tenure ended in 2022 when his contract was not renewed.

== Statistics ==
Legend
G	Goals	K	Kicks	D	Disposals	T	Tackles
B	Behinds	H	Handballs	M	Marks

Season	Team	No.	Games	Totals							Averages (per game)							Votes
Season	Team	No.	Games	G	B	K	H	D	M	T	G	B	K	H	D	M	T	Votes
2007	Hawthorn	37	1	0	0	8	2	10	6	1	0.0	0.0	8.0	2.0	10.0	6.0	1.0	0
2008	Hawthorn	28	0	—	—	—	—	—	—	—	—	—	—	—	—	—	—	0
2009	Hawthorn	28	9	9	4	86	57	143	47	14	1.0	0.4	9.6	6.3	15.9	5.2	1.6	0
2010	Hawthorn	28	4	3	2	35	21	56	19	5	0.8	0.5	8.8	5.3	14.0	4.8	1.3	0
Career			14	12	6	129	80	209	72	20	0.9	0.4	9.2	5.7	14.9	5.1	1.4	0

== Honours and achievements ==
Individual

- AFL Rising Star nominee: 2009
