= Jayden Attard =

Australian rules footballer

Personal information
- Full name: Jayden Attard
- Born: 27 February 1986 (age 40)
- Original team: Dandenong Stingrays (TAC Cup)
- Draft: 50th overall, 2004; Brisbane Lions
- Height: 187 cm (6 ft 2 in)
- Weight: 83 kg (183 lb)
- Position: Midfielder

Playing career^{1}
Years	Club	Games (Goals)
2005–2006	Brisbane Lions	5 (1)
2007–2008	St Kilda	20 (2)
Total		25 (3)
- ^{1} Playing statistics correct to the end of 2008.

Jayden Attard (born 27 February 1986) is a former professional Australian rules footballer who played for the Brisbane Lions and the St Kilda Football Club in the Australian Football League (AFL) from 2005 to 2008.

Of Maltese descent, Attard was recruited as the number 50 draft pick in the 2004 AFL draft from Chelsea and Dandenong Stingrays. He made his debut for Brisbane in Round 4, 2005 against Hawthorn.

Attard was delisted by the Lions at the end of the 2006 season. He was then drafted as a rookie by the St Kilda Football Club in the 2006 AFL Rookie Draft and was elevated to the senior list at the start of the 2007 season and made his debut with the Saints in Round 1.

After an impressive first year at the Saints, Attard ruptured his ACL in Round 21 of the 2007 season, continuing the Saints' run of injuries. He missed all the 2008 AFL Season.

On 22 October 2008 the St Kilda Football Club announced they would be delisting Attard.

In 2009 Attard joined Chelsea Heights Football Club in the Southern Football League as co-captain. He continued with Chelsea Heights as captain until the end of 2013 and then signed for his junior club, Chelsea Seagulls Football Club, for the 2014 season. Attard captained the Seagulls in 2014 & 2015, before joining Toora Football club in 2016.
