= Malcolm Lynch =

Australian rules footballer

Personal information
- Full name: Malcolm Lynch
- Born: 16 March 1988 (age 38); Tiwi Islands, Northern Territory
- Original teams: Saint Ignatius' College, Riverview (NSW)
- Draft: No. 46, 2011 Pre-season Draft, North Melbourne
- Height: 178 cm (5 ft 10 in)
- Weight: 68 kg (150 lb)

Playing career^{1}
| Years | Club | Games (Goals) |
| 2007 | Western Bulldogs | 2 (0) |
- ^{1} Playing statistics correct to the end of 2011.

Malcolm Lynch (born 16 March 1988) is a former professional Australian rules footballer who played with the North Melbourne Football Club and the Western Bulldogs in the Australian Football League (AFL).

Originally from the Tiwi Islands in the Northern Territory, Lynch played football in the Northern Territory until he won a scholarship and attended Saint Ignatius' College, Riverview in Sydney. In 2006 Lynch represented the "Flying Boomerangs", Australia's Indigenous youth team, on a tour of South Africa, including a match against the South African Buffaloes, South Africa's national Australian rules team.

Lynch was selected at number 66 overall by the Western Bulldogs at the 2007 AFL draft and following some performances with the Bulldogs' Victorian Football League (VFL) affiliate Williamstown Football Club, made his AFL debut in round 12 2007 against the Fremantle Dockers. After two senior games with the Bulldogs Lynch was delisted at the end of the 2009 AFL season.

In 2010 Lynch became the first Indigenous Australian to set foot on Antarctica.

In 2012 Lynch was given a second chance at the AFL when he was drafted at 46 by North Melbourne at the 2012 Rookie Draft but after failing to play a senior match was delisted at the end of the 2012 AFL season.
