= Daniel Connors =

Australian rules footballer

Personal information
- Full name: Daniel Connors
- Born: 22 September 1988 (age 38); Victoria
- Original team: Echuca / Bendigo Pioneers
- Draft: 58th overall, 2006; Richmond
- Height: 186 cm (6 ft 1 in)
- Weight: 84 kg (185 lb)
- Position: Midfield / half forward flank / half back flank

Club information
- Current club: Port Melbourne
- Number: 18

Playing career^{1}
Years	Club	Games (Goals)
2007–2012	Richmond	29 (11)
- ^{1} Playing statistics correct to the end of 2012.

Daniel Connors (born 22 September 1988) is an Australian rules footballer who was selected at number 58 overall in the 2006 AFL national draft by the Richmond Football Club. Originally from the Echuca Football Club, he played for Bendigo Pioneers in the TAC Cup and was named in the 2006 TAC Cup Team of the Year and the All-Australian team after representing Victoria Country at the National Under 18 Championships. Daniel Connors was considered a "steal" from the 2006 National Draft as many touted him as a possible top 20 pick but slipped down to the 58th selection where Richmond selected him with their third selection.

After playing 18 games in his first two-season, Connors' contract was extended in 2008 and with a change of coach at the end of the 2009 season, he was seen as a potential key to Richmond's future success.

== Controversies ==
Connors was suspended by Richmond for eight matches following a drunken rampage outside a Sydney hotel in 2010, hours after the Tigers' Round 3 loss against the Sydney Swans the night before. He, along with senior players Ben Cousins, Dean Polo and Luke McGuane were banned over the drunken rampage. Late that season, Connors earned the ire of umpire Stuart Wenn when the umpire told him that he was "battling himself out of his league".

He had further behavioural issues relating to alcohol during the 2011/12 AFL off-season, earning a further internal suspension from the club. His suspensions and injuries saw him fail to play a senior game between Round 3, 2011 and Round 12, 2012, but he kicked two late goals to help Richmond narrowly defeat Greater Western Sydney in his return match.

Connors was sacked by the Tigers on 4 July 2012 for failing to attend training. Craig Cameron, Richmond's General Manager of Football, stated that Connors had "failed to meet club expectations on a number of occasions" and that "this latest incident can't be considered in isolation."

On 31 August 2016 Daniel Connors pleaded guilty in Echuca Magistrates Court to reckless conduct endangering serious injury and failing to leave a licensed premises. Daniel Connors left a man with a severed tendon in his hand due to a broken beer glass after violently attacking him at a hotel. Connors then tried punching the victim twice, despite the man telling him he did not want to fight. Connors then threatened to smash the victim in two, before threatening security and resisting their attempts to remove him from the venue.

== Post-AFL career ==
Connors played for Aberfeldie in the Essendon District Football League in 2013, then signed to play with Port Melbourne in the Victorian Football League in 2014. He tied with Box Hill's Sam Grimley for the Frosty Miller Medal as the leading goalkicker in the 2014 VFL home-and-away season, kicking 38 goals for the year.

His younger brother Eljay was drafted by St Kilda in 2007, but did not play a league game before he was delisted at the end of the 2009 season.
