= Ricky Petterd =

Australian rules footballer

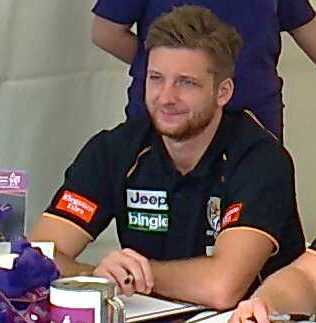
- Petterd in February 2014

Personal information
- Full name: Ricky Petterd
- Born: 24 July 1988 (age 38); Hobart, Tasmania
- Original teams: Broadbeach, Surfers Paradise
- Draft: 30th overall, 2006 national draft
- Height: 185 cm (6 ft 1 in)
- Weight: 85 kg (187 lb)
- Position: Forward/utility

Playing career^{1}
Years	Club	Games (Goals)
2007–2012	Melbourne	54 (55)
2013–2015	Richmond	30 (17)
Total		84 (72)
- ^{1} Playing statistics correct to the end of 2015.

Career highlights
- 2007 AFL Rising Star nomination; Harrison Medal 2006; Harold Ball Memorial Trophy 2007

Ricky Petterd (born 24 July 1988) is a former professional Australian rules footballer who played for the Melbourne Football Club and Richmond Football Club in the Australian Football League (AFL).

Petterd was drafted to Melbourne with the 30th overall pick in the 2006 national draft. He is a state representative footballer from Broadbeach on the Gold Coast, Queensland who made his senior debut with Melbourne in round 5 of 2007, where he had 22 disposals in the midfield and featured in the Demons best player list. He followed up his first game performance with an AFL Rising Star nomination in round 6.

While with Melbourne he had a season-ending injury in round 14 of 2007 against Carlton. He collapsed during the game and could not breathe. Two club doctors realised there was no time to send him to hospital and punctured his chest wall in the change rooms, allowing air to escape from his chest cavity. This in turn allowed his ruptured lung to re-expand, effectively saving his life. He subsequently had surgery to permanently repair the lung.

Petterd suffered another season-ending injury with Melbourne in May 2010, when he suffered a dislocated right shoulder that required surgery and a four-month recovery period. He played only six games in that season.

Petterd joined Richmond in 2013 as a rookie. In his first season with the Tigers he played 12 games, averaging 17 disposals and five marks per game and was then elevated to the senior list at the 2013 national draft.

He announced his immediate retirement from the AFL in September 2015, citing an ongoing foot injury, following 54 matches with Melbourne and 30 with Richmond.

== Playing statistics ==
Legend
G	Goals	K	Kicks	D	Disposals	T	Tackles
B	Behinds	H	Handballs	M	Marks

Season	Team	No.	Games	Totals							Averages (per game)						
Season	Team	No.	Games	G	B	K	H	D	M	T	G	B	K	H	D	M	T
2007	Melbourne	15	9	6	2	71	53	124	51	18	0.7	0.2	7.9	5.9	13.8	5.7	2.0
2008	Melbourne	15	2	0	0	12	8	20	11	2	0.0	0.0	6.0	4.0	10.0	5.5	1.0
2009	Melbourne	15	18	19	8	159	94	253	103	32	1.1	0.4	8.8	5.2	14.1	5.7	1.8
2010	Melbourne	15	6	12	6	49	28	77	32	21	2.0	1.0	8.2	4.7	12.8	5.3	3.5
2011	Melbourne	15	15	18	11	156	67	223	79	59	1.2	0.7	10.4	4.5	14.9	5.3	3.9
2012	Melbourne	15	4	0	3	28	15	43	12	11	0.0	0.8	7.0	3.8	10.8	3.0	2.8
2013	Richmond	13	12	4	4	124	85	209	64	30	0.3	0.3	10.3	7.1	17.4	5.3	2.5
2014	Richmond	13	17	12	5	194	108	302	100	63	0.7	0.3	11.4	6.4	17.8	5.9	3.7
2015	Richmond	13	1	1	1	10	5	15	7	2	1.0	1.0	10.0	5.0	15.0	7.0	2.0
Career			84	72	40	803	463	1266	459	238	0.9	0.5	9.6	5.5	15.1	5.5	2.8
