= Peter Everitt =

Australian rules footballer (born 1974)

Personal information
- Full name: Peter Everitt
- Born: 3 May 1974 (age 52)
- Original team: Hastings, Victoria
- Height: 203 cm (6 ft 8 in)
- Weight: 108 kg (238 lb)

Playing career^{1}
Years	Club	Games (Goals)
1993–2002	St Kilda	180 (300)
2003–2006	Hawthorn	72 (67)
2007–2008	Sydney	39 (16)
Total		291 (383)
- ^{1} Playing statistics correct to the end of 2008.

Career highlights
- Trevor Barker Award: 2001; Peter Crimmins Medal: 2004; St Kilda leading goalkicker: 2000; 3× All-Australian team: 1997, 1998, 2005; AFL Rising Star nominee: 1993; St Kilda Pre-Season Premiership Player: 1996

Peter "Spida" Everitt (born 3 May 1974) is a former Australian rules footballer who played for the St Kilda Football Club, Hawthorn Football Club and Sydney Swans in the Australian Football League (AFL). He played for St Kilda from 1993 to 2002, Hawthorn from 2003 to 2006, and Sydney in 2007 and 2008. He finished his career having played 291 games in the AFL. Since retiring from football he has worked in the media.

== Early life ==
Everitt was born on the Mornington Peninsula. For part of his childhood, he resided in Wantirna.

Everitt is one of six children, including younger brother Andrejs, born to Anda (née Tiltins) and Peter Everitt. The siblings are of Latvian descent through their mother. Their maternal grandfather Raimond Tiltins was a member of the Latvian Legion during World War II, before immigrating to Australia in 1948. Their paternal grandfather Phillip Everitt was born in England and was sent to Australia as part of the Home Children scheme.

== Career ==
=== St Kilda ===
Making his debut for St Kilda in 1993, Everitt became one of the Saints' best ruckmen.

Everitt played in St Kilda's 1996 pre-season Cup winning side.

Everitt played every match of the 1997 season home and away rounds in which St Kilda Football Club qualified in first position for the 1997 AFL Finals Series, winning the club's second Minor Premiership and first McClelland Trophy. He won All-Australian selection in 1997, but he suffered a collarbone injury late in the year, missing the Grand Final. He again won All-Australian selection in 1998.

=== Hawthorn career ===
At the end of 2002, Everitt was traded to Hawthorn, and he became one of the premier tap ruckmen in the competition, winning All-Australian selection in 2005. He was traded to the Sydney Swans for the 2007 season.

In September 2006, it was announced that Everitt would not be playing for the Hawks in 2007. Hawthorn coach Alastair Clarkson said in a statement released by the club that Everitt had failed to reach an agreement with Hawthorn regarding his contract. Everitt had allegedly requested a two-year contract, but Hawthorn was only prepared to offer the then 32-year-old ruckman a one-year deal. The Hawks agreed to seek to trade Everitt with another club.

=== Sydney career ===
Consequently, on 13 October 2006, Everitt was traded to the Sydney Swans in the final minutes of trade week in return for draft pick 33. The trade ended strong belief that Everitt would be forced to nominate for the pre-season draft and risk being picked up by another club rather than Sydney following a stall in negotiations between the two clubs.

Everitt spent two seasons at the Swans before retiring after the Swans' semi-finals defeat in 2008.

=== Statistics ===
Legend
G	Goals	K	Kicks	D	Disposals	T	Tackles
B	Behinds	H	Handballs	M	Marks	H/O	Hit-outs

Led the league for the season only
Led the league after season and finals

Season	Team	No.	Games	Totals								Averages (per game)							
Season	Team	No.	Games	G	B	K	H	D	M	T	H/O	G	B	K	H	D	M	T	H/O
1993	St Kilda	10	13	16	14	112	54	166	54	6	122	1.2	1.1	8.6	4.2	12.8	4.2	0.5	9.4
1994	St Kilda	10	18	13	6	75	36	111	39	8	57	0.7	0.3	4.2	2.0	2.2	0.4	3.2	6.2
1995	St Kilda	10	18	32	20	143	56	199	92	9	115	1.8	1.1	7.9	3.1	11.1	5.1	0.5	6.4
1996	St Kilda	10	19	41	23	152	76	228	101	16	139	2.2	1.2	8.0	4.0	12.0	5.3	0.8	7.3
1997	St Kilda	10	23	44	25	256	90	346	135	23	302	1.9	1.1	11.1	3.9	15.0	5.9	1.0	13.1
1998	St Kilda	10	24	45	32	300	111	411	163	22	433	1.9	1.3	12.5	4.6	17.1	6.8	0.9	18.0
1999	St Kilda	10	17	22	21	166	58	224	101	16	347	1.3	1.2	9.8	3.4	13.2	5.9	0.9	20.4
2000	St Kilda	10	15	40	18	129	47	176	74	15	186	2.7	1.2	8.6	3.1	11.7	4.9	1.0	12.4
2001	St Kilda	10	21	30	24	201	64	265	98	32	569	1.4	1.1	9.6	3.0	12.6	4.7	1.5	27.1
2002	St Kilda	10	12	16	10	96	36	132	52	18	264	1.3	0.8	8.0	3.0	11.0	4.3	1.5	22.0
2003	Hawthorn	1	14	17	7	130	44	174	67	24	330	1.2	0.5	9.3	3.1	12.4	4.8	1.7	23.6
2004	Hawthorn	1	22	28	11	203	90	293	99	43	628	1.3	0.5	9.2	4.1	13.3	4.5	2.0	28.5
2005	Hawthorn	1	22	17	15	261	121	382	123	46	556	0.8	0.7	11.9	5.5	17.4	5.6	2.1	25.3
2006	Hawthorn	1	14	5	3	114	54	168	58	25	309	0.4	0.2	8.1	3.9	12.0	4.1	1.8	22.1
2007	Sydney	10	23	15	9	178	78	256	93	18	405	0.7	0.4	7.7	3.4	11.1	4.0	0.8	17.6
2008	Sydney	10	16	2	4	92	45	137	41	20	199	0.1	0.3	5.8	2.8	8.6	2.6	1.3	12.4
Career			291	383	242	2608	1060	3668	1390	341	4961	1.3	0.8	9.0	3.6	12.6	4.8	1.2	17.0

== Media career ==
Everitt co-hosts the number 1 Breakfast Radio Show at Triple M on the Gold Coast 2022 is his 11th year. He was formerly a member of The Home Straight radio show which aired Friday evenings on Gold 92.5 amongst other regional radio stations across Australia until 2012. He is also an AFL commentator on radio with Triple M.

Everitt and his wife Sheree also own the travel TV show The Great Australian Doorstep, in which they travel around Australia and the world by motorhome filming smaller towns with what to see and do. It airs on 7two in Australia as well as on the iTunes store, and is the only Australian travel TV show to air in mainland China. They also own their travel radio show of the same name, which airs on 62 Triple M stations around Australia on a Saturday and Sunday morning.

He also competed in the 9th season of Dancing with the Stars and was the first competitor to be eliminated.

== Personal life ==
On 12 January 2008, Everitt married partner of seven years Sheree in New Zealand. Everitt has three daughters and a son.

His younger brother, Andrejs Everitt, played 131 games at the Western Bulldogs, Sydney Swans and Carlton between 2007 and 2016. In 2022, his son Boston is part of the St Kilda Football Club Father–Son Programme.

== Racism incidents ==
Everitt was first publicly exposed for his racist taunts after he racially vilified aboriginal player Michael Long, an Essendon and AFL Hall of Famer, in 1997.

During a game against Melbourne in Round 2, 1999, Everitt racially vilified Scott Chisolm. Everitt admitted he "probably crossed a line" and voluntarily stood down for four weeks and undertook a racial awareness training program as well as donating $20,000 to a charity of Chisolm's choice. In addition, Everitt lost $50,000–$60,000 in match bonuses (depending on sources) from the incident. The incident came a week after Sam Newman infamously donned blackface to mock Nicky Winmar for declining to come on The Footy Show.
