= Shannon Cox =

Australian rules footballer

Personal information
- Born: 7 March 1986 (age 40); Western Australia
- Original team: South Fremantle (WAFL)
- Debut: Round 3, 13 April 2007, Collingwood vs. Richmond, at MCG

Playing career^{1}
Years	Club	Games (Goals)
2007–2009	Collingwood	25 (6)
- ^{1} Playing statistics correct to the end of 2009.

Shannon John Cox (born 7 March 1986) is a former Australian rules footballer for the Collingwood Football Club in the Australian Football League (AFL).

Cox, an Indigenous footballer, was picked up as a rookie by Collingwood at the 2006 AFL rookie draft and, following some good performances for Williamstown in the Victorian Football League (VFL), was promoted to the senior list for the 2007 AFL season and made his AFL debut in round 3 of that season. In 2009, he played 11 of the first 13 games, including a career high 28 possession game against the Brisbane Lions in round 4.

On 12 November 2009, Cox announced his retirement, citing a loss of passion for the game.

On 9 June 2024, Shannon Cox was charged with two offences of dangerous driving occasioning death, after two ladies in their 80s were killed in a motor vehicle accident on the Brand Highway near Cooljarloo on 7 June 2024. In October 2025 Cox was sentenced to 10 years and six months in prison for the two counts of manslaughter over the fatal accident. He is eligible for parole after serving eight years and six months and his driver’s licence is to be disqualified for four years upon his release.
