= Leigh Adams (footballer) =

Australian rules footballer

Personal information
- Full name: Leigh Adams
- Born: 6 April 1988 (age 38)
- Original team: Eastern Ranges (TAC Cup)
- Draft: No. 3, 2007 Rookie draft, Kangaroos
- Height: 176 cm (5 ft 9 in)
- Weight: 78 kg (172 lb)
- Position: Midfielder

Playing career^{1}
Years	Club	Games (Goals)
2007–2014	North Melbourne	104 (72)

Coaching career^{3}
Years	Club	Games (W–L–D)
2022	North Melbourne	5 (1–4–0)
- ^{1} Playing statistics correct to the end of 2015.^{3} Coaching statistics correct as of 2022.

Leigh Adams (born 6 April 1988) is a former professional Australian rules footballer who played with the North Melbourne Football Club in the Australian Football League (AFL).

== Playing career ==
A small midfielder who was selected in the 2007 Rookie draft from Eastern Ranges in the TAC Cup, he captained the Victorian Metro team in the 2006 AFL Under 18 Championships and won the team's Most Valuable Player award. He was hampered at the AFL draft camp after he suffered a hip injury requiring surgery.

=== North Melbourne ===
He was elevated from the rookie list in 2007, replacing Leigh Harding. after playing well for Tasmanian Devils Football Club in the Victorian Football League (VFL). Despite playing only 13 games for Tasmania, he won their best and fairest award in 2007. He has struggled with injury since then, missing the entire 2008 season due to an Anterior cruciate ligament tear whilst playing for Werribee Football Club in the VFL.

Adams returned to the North Melbourne side in Round 15, 2009, over two years after his last game. He was one of North's best players in their loss to the West Coast Eagles in Round 20, kicking three goals.

Adams retired on 1 August 2015 due to ongoing issues with concussion.

Adams played for North Melbourne from 2007 until 2014 for a total of 104 games and kicked 72 goals.

== Coaching career ==
Since retiring, Adams went straight into coaching with South Croydon in the Eastern Football League. After a lackluster 2016 season only managing six wins, the 2017 season saw Adams lead them to twelve wins & third place on the ladder in Division One. After suffering a 76-point loss to Vermont in the second semi-final, the two sides would meet again in the Grand Final, for South Croydon to cause a massive 18-point upset win over Vermont, who had only suffered one loss all season. Adams was also named the competitions Coach of the Year.

Less than a week after the Grand Final Victory, Adams was named as the newly appointed Coach of Coburg Football Club in the Victorian Football League, replacing a former North Melbourne past player in Peter German. Adams' first season was a tough one with the club only winning one game (along with one draw), however was credited with the teams improvement in 2019, and while they only won two games, Coburg looked a whole lot more competitive. He resigned on 25 July with four games left remaining in the season.

=== North Melbourne ===
In September 2019, it was announced Adams would return to North Melbourne as an assistant coach in the role of Development Coach for the 2020 season. and additionally was given the role of VFL team coach for the 2021 season.

In July 2022, Adams was appointed caretaker senior coach of North Melbourne for the rest of the 2022 season, after the club and senior coach David Noble parted ways, when Noble was sacked as senior coach. At the end of the 2022 season, Adams was not retained as senior coach of North Melbourne and was replaced by Alastair Clarkson. Adams however remained at the North Melbourne Football Club as assistant coach.

=== Carlton ===
At the end of 2025, Adams departed North Melbourne and joined the Carlton Football Club as an assistant coach in the role of midfield coach under senior coach Michael Voss.

== Statistics ==
Legend
G	Goals	K	Kicks	D	Disposals	T	Tackles
B	Behinds	H	Handballs	M	Marks

Season	Team	No.	Games	Totals							Averages (per game)						
Season	Team	No.	Games	G	B	K	H	D	M	T	G	B	K	H	D	M	T
2007	Kangaroos	40	2	0	0	5	8	13	2	7	0.0	0.0	2.5	4.0	6.5	1.0	3.5
2008	North Melbourne	13	0	—	—	—	—	—	—	—	—	—	—	—	—	—	—
2009	North Melbourne	13	6	6	1	53	49	102	23	26	1.0	0.2	8.8	8.2	17.0	3.8	4.3
2010	North Melbourne	13	15	11	15	166	133	299	59	56	0.7	1.0	11.1	8.9	19.9	3.9	3.7
2011	North Melbourne	13	21	16	17	198	219	417	94	87	0.8	0.8	9.4	10.4	19.9	4.5	4.1
2012	North Melbourne	13	18	17	15	180	164	344	50	59	0.9	0.8	10.0	9.1	19.1	2.8	3.3
2013	North Melbourne	13	20	13	8	173	188	361	73	66	0.7	0.4	8.7	9.4	18.1	3.7	3.3
2014	North Melbourne	13	22	9	11	154	183	337	73	63	0.4	0.5	7.0	8.3	15.3	3.3	2.9
2015	North Melbourne	13	0	—	—	—	—	—	—	—	—	—	—	—	—	—	—
Career			104	72	67	929	944	1873	374	364	0.7	0.6	8.9	9.1	18.0	3.6	3.5
