= Tom Hislop =

Australian rules footballer

Personal information
- Full name: Tom Hislop
- Born: 7 June 1988 (age 38); Burnie, Tasmania, Australia
- Original team: Tassie Mariners (TAC Cup)
- Draft: No. 20, 2006 national draft No. 58, 2008 national draft
- Height: 185 cm (6 ft 1 in)
- Weight: 83 kg (183 lb)

Playing career^{1}
Years	Club	Games (Goals)
2007–2008	Essendon	7 (2)
2009–2011	Richmond	20 (10)
Total		27 (12)
- ^{1} Playing statistics correct to the end of 2011.

Tom Hislop (born 7 June 1988) is a former professional Australian rules footballer who played for the Essendon Football Club and Richmond Football Club in the Australian Football League (AFL).

He was drafted by the Essendon Football Club in 2006 at pick 20 in the 2006 AFL draft.

He made his debut in Round 14 against Geelong and kicked a goal. However, he suffered a stress fracture prior to round 17 and missed the rest of the 2007 season.

In 2008, Hislop injured his wrist and missed a few weeks but made his return with the VFL side, Bendigo Bombers in round 6. He returned to the senior team in round 7.

Essendon delisted Hislop at the end of the 2008 AFL season. Hislop nominated for the 2008 national draft and was recruited by the Richmond Football Club with pick 58.

Hislop was delisted by Richmond in October 2010 after playing fifteen senior games in his two seasons at the club. He was then re-drafted by Richmond and played his first game of 2011 against the Sydney Swans at the Sydney Cricket Ground.

In November 2011, Tom signed with Aberfeldie Football Club in the Essendon District Football League in Metropolitan Melbourne and played in the 2012 season along with his two younger brothers, Jacob and Zachary who also signed to play at the club. All three played together in Season 2013, albeit Tom did not play many games due to injury.
