= Lachlan Hansen =

Australian rules footballer (born 1988)

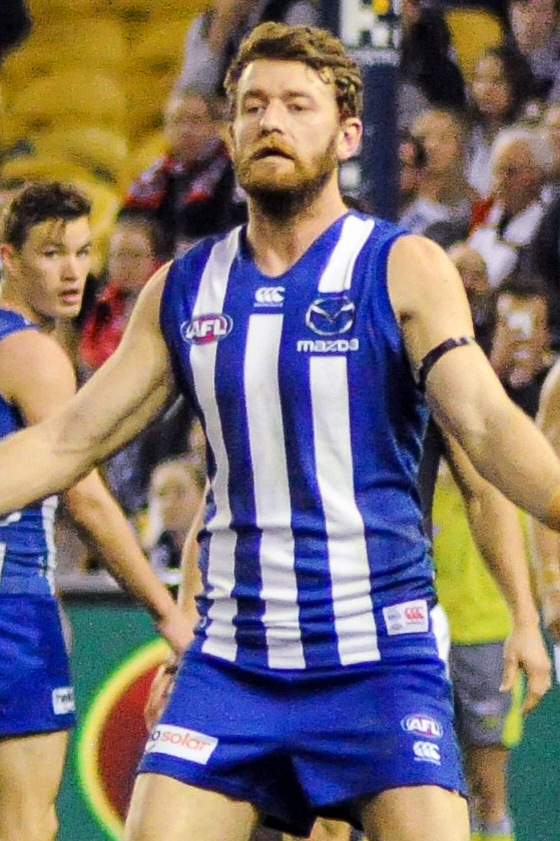
- Hansen in June 2017

Personal information
- Full name: Lachlan Hansen
- Born: 17 August 1988 (age 38); Melbourne
- Original team: Gippsland Power (TAC Cup)
- Draft: No. 3, 2006 national draft
- Height: 197 cm (6 ft 6 in)
- Weight: 98 kg (216 lb)
- Position: Centre half-back

Playing career^{1}
Years	Club	Games (Goals)
2007–2017	North Melbourne	151 (81)
- ^{1} Playing statistics correct to the end of 2017.

Lachlan Hansen (born 17 August 1988) is a former professional Australian rules footballer who played for the North Melbourne Football Club in the Australian Football League (AFL).

== AFL career ==
Hansen was drafted by North Melbourne with pick three in the 2006 AFL draft. Prior to the 2006 AFL draft, Hansen was widely seen as one of the top key position players for his age group, and was expected to be selected by the Kangaroos in the number three spot.

As a natural centre half back player, Hansen's physical stature placed him in the immediate limelight with media pundits when a rivalry was formed between himself and the number two draft pick from Essendon, Scott Gumbleton, who is a natural centre half forward.

After three games in his debut year (2007), including a final against Hawthorn, Hansen was hampered by injury in the early part of 2008. He made it back into the team for North Melbourne in the round 13 clash against Hawthorn and remained in the team for the remainder of the home and away season. He was a late withdrawal, however, in the final against Sydney due to the inclement weather.

Hansen played the first five matches of the 2009 season before suffering a severe hamstring tear in round 5 against Richmond. He missed the next six weeks. During his absence, Nathan Grima cemented a spot in the side, and upon his return, Hansen was played up forward to address a hole in the team. He came back into the side in round 12 against Adelaide and after a few games back in defence he was moved forward. He kicked three goals in the round 19 clash against Melbourne at Etihad Stadium.

Hansen began the 2010 season in defence. Following a combination of poor form and injury by a couple of the North Melbourne forwards, he was switched to centre half-forward against the Brisbane Lions in round 11. He went onto kicking 23 goals, including five against Port Adelaide and four against Geelong in consecutive weeks, in addition to kicking four against St Kilda. His contested marking, a feature of his pre-draft days, was a highlight in 2010 at either end of the ground. Hansen cemented a spot in the team's 22 for the majority of the year.

Despite patches of form and frustration through 2011 and 2012, Hansen was a regular in the North Melbourne line-up. An injury in the 2012 pre-season along with a suspension in the Victorian Football League (VFL) saw his return to the side delayed until the second half of the season. He played in the forward line and kicked five goals from the first four games in 2013 before missing two weeks with a medial knee injury. He came straight back into the side in round 7, however, he played in the back line. Since his move back, he polled well in the coaches votes, earning votes in four games including a stand-out performance against Richmond in round 15. He suffered a concussion in the first minutes of the round 16 game against the Brisbane Lions and was subbed off. He finished eighth in the Syd Barker Medal. He led North Melbourne in general marking and was one of the league's best in respect to intercept marks. He also used his endurance to great effect as a loose man in defence on many occasions, setting up scoring opportunities.

2014 was a mixed season for Hansen, where he was limited to 18 games due to a chronic hip injury. He finished the season third in total marks at North Melbourne despite missing seven games.

Following surgery on both hips, a long rehabilitation followed, including doing no running until mid-January 2015. This meant a delayed start to the season before returning against Richmond in round 6 at Hobart in which he recorded 12 possessions and 11 marks before sitting out the last quarter. Against Essendon in round 7, he recorded 24 possessions and 14 marks with five intercept marks. Hansen spent the 2016 season evenly between the AFL and VFL, while missing some time recovering from a concussion. Hansen played five games at AFL level including the side's elimination final loss.

In October 2017, he was delisted by North Melbourne when they informed him he would not receive a new contract for the 2018 season.
