= Neville Stibbard (footballer, born 1952) =

Australian rules footballer (born 1952)

Personal information
- Full name: Neville G. Stibbard
- Born: 9 February 1952 (age 74)
- Original team: Ivanhoe Amateurs
- Height: 178 cm (5 ft 10 in)
- Weight: 74 kg (163 lb)

Playing career^{1}
Years	Club	Games (Goals)
1973–1975	South Melbourne	23 (22)
- ^{1} Playing statistics correct to the end of 1975.

Neville Stibbard (born 9 February 1952) is a former Australian rules footballer who played with South Melbourne in the Victorian Football League (VFL).

Stibbard's father, also named Neville, played for South Melbourne and North Melbourne during the 1940s.

== Playing career ==
Recruited from Ivanhoe Amateurs, Stibbard joined his twin brother Robert at South Melbourne in the 1973 VFL season and made 10 appearances in his first year. In 1974 he played 11 games for South Melbourne. He was one of his side's best in their round seven win over Melbourne at Lake Oval, with four goals and 20 disposals.

Cleared to Port Melbourne in 1975, Stibbard was a back pocket in the club's 1977 premiership team.

== Recruiting ==
Stibbard was head of recruiting at North Melbourne for many years, including the successful era in the 1990s under Denis Pagan. In the 1996 National Draft, he secured Byron Pickett at pick 67, who went on to win the Rising Star award in 1998. Before he came to North Melbourne, at the end of the 1993 AFL season, Stibbard was a recruiting manager for Fitzroy. He remained with North Melbourne until 2008.

More recently he was recruiting manager at the AFL's newest club Greater Western Sydney and in 2014 joined the Western Bulldogs in a part-time capacity.
