= Robert Stibbard =

Australian rules footballer

Personal information
- Full name: Robert Stibbard
- Born: 9 February 1952 (age 74)
- Original team: Ivanhoe Amateurs
- Height: 180 cm (5 ft 11 in)
- Weight: 80 kg (176 lb)

Playing career^{1}
Years	Club	Games (Goals)
1972–74	South Melbourne	14 (2)
- ^{1} Playing statistics correct to the end of 1974.

Robert Stibbard (born 9 February 1952) is a former Australian rules footballer who played with South Melbourne in the Victorian Football League (VFL).
