= Joel Selwood =

Australian rules footballer

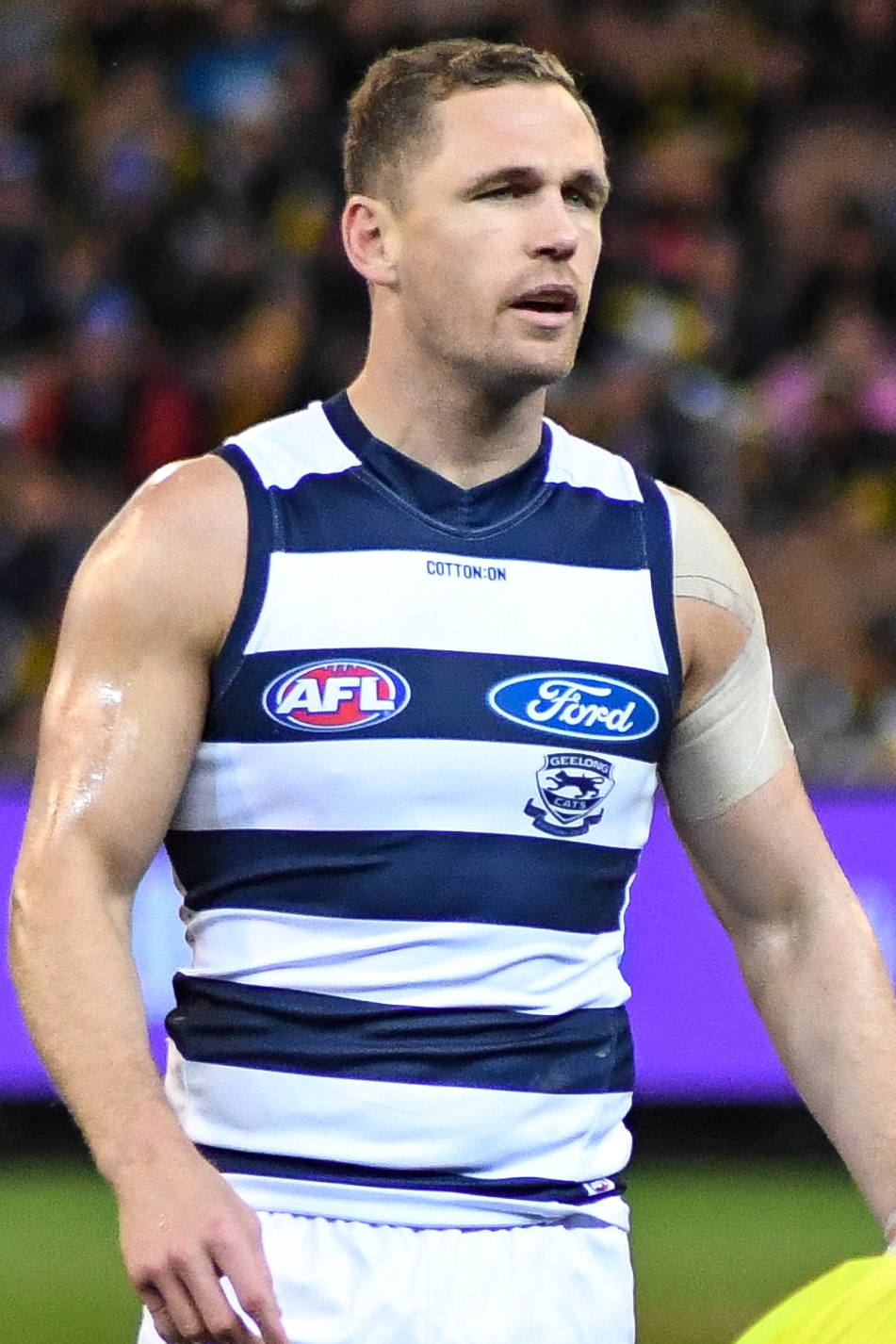
- Selwood in 2018

Personal information
- Full name: Joel Anthony Selwood
- Born: 26 May 1988 (age 38); Bendigo, Victoria, Australia
- Original teams: Sandhurst (BFL); Bendigo Pioneers (TAC Cup)
- Draft: No. 7, 2006 national draft
- Height: 184 cm (6 ft 0 in)
- Weight: 84 kg (185 lb)
- Position: Midfielder

Playing career^{1}
| Years | Club | Games (Goals) |
| 2007–2022 | Geelong | 355 (175) |

Representative team honours^{2}
| Years | Team | Games (Goals) |
| 2008 | Victoria | 1 (0) |

International team honours^{2}
| 2014, 2017 | Australia | 3 (0) |
- ^{1} Playing statistics correct to the end of the 2022 season.^{2} Representative statistics correct as of 2017.

Career highlights
- 4× AFL premiership player: 2007, 2009, 2011, 2022 (c); 6× All-Australian team: (2009, 2010, 2013(c), 2014(c), 2016(c), 2017); 4× AFLPA Robert Rose Most Courageous Player Award: (2009, 2012, 2013, 2014); 3× Carji Greeves Medal: (2010, 2013, 2014); Geelong captain: (2012–2022); AFLPA best captain award: (2013); Herald Sun Player of the Year: (2014); Ron Evans Medal: (2007); AFLPA best first-year player award: (2007); 2x Peter Badcoe VC Medal: (2016, 2018); AFLCA best young player award: (2008); Pre-season premiership player: (2009); Michael Tuck Medal: (2009); Australian IRS captain: (2014); Most games played as an AFL captain (245 games); Most wins as an AFL captain (160 wins); Jim Stynes Community Leadership Award (2022); Most finals ever played (40)

Joel Anthony Selwood (born 26 May 1988) is a former Australian rules footballer who played for the Geelong Football Club in the Australian Football League (AFL). He is a four-time premiership player (including one time as captain), a six-time All-Australian, and a three-time captain of the All-Australian team. Selwood captained Geelong between 2012 and 2022, has won the Carji Greeves Medal three times as their best and fairest player, and holds the record for longest-serving captain in the AFL.

A standout junior track and field athlete and footballer, Selwood entered top-level football early, joining the TAC Cup competition as a bottom-aged player. His accomplishments as a junior included Most Valuable Player awards at state and international levels, and he earned selection in the under-18 All-Australian and TAC Cup Team of the Year sides as a junior. A potential top pick in the 2006 AFL draft, Selwood sustained a serious knee injury during his final year of junior football that caused him to fall to Geelong's first pick at seventh overall. Selwood made his AFL debut in 2007, winning the AFL Rising Star Award and AFLPA Best First-Year Player Award. He set a VFL/AFL record with a 92% winning percentage in his first 50 games (46–4), and he was a member of three premiership teams with Geelong in his first five seasons (2007, 2009, and 2011), the last of which as vice-captain. With Selwood made captain of the team in 2012, Geelong made the finals in all but one season during his tenure, playing in seven preliminary finals and two Grand Finals—culminating in Geelong's tenth premiership in 2022, after which Selwood retired.

Selwood has been recognized for his leadership abilities, his high levels of courage, and his consistency throughout most of his career. He was appointed captain at just 23 years old, and he has won the AFLPA Best Captain Award. He is a four-time recipient of the AFLPA Robert Rose Most Courageous Player Award. He has played in 20 games every full season of his career, and averaged over 24 disposals per game over his career, including at least 20 disposals in every full season except his debut year. (Note: The only time Selwood did not play 20 games and the only other time he did not average 20 disposals was the 2020 season where the home and away season was shortened from 22 games to 17 and the length of the quarters of each game was shortened from 20 minutes to 16.) He polled double-digit Brownlow votes for 11 consecutive seasons, including 27 votes in 2013 when he was runner-up for the award. Selwood excelled at breaking tackles and earning free kicks, although his methods of drawing free kicks were a constant source of annoyance to critics throughout his career. He also averaged about five tackles per game and has the second-most tackles in VFL/AFL history behind Scott Pendlebury.

== Early life ==
Joel Selwood was born on 26 May 1988 to Bryce and Maree Selwood in the country city of Bendigo, Victoria. He was raised in a family of sportspeople. His mother Maree was a top runner and tennis player, and elder twins Adam and Troy were identified as talented footballers at a young age. As a two-year-old, Selwood was forced to wear splints on his leg to help overcome a walking disability.

Selwood displayed athletic talent from an early age. He was the state hurdling champion from under-10s through to the under-15s, and in one year held every running and jumping record at the Bendigo Sports Centre except the 100 metres sprint. Growing up with his older brothers, Selwood was accustomed to playing with bigger teammates and opponents. By age eight, he played his first competitive game of football, against children four years his senior, and kicked three goals. Selwood attended Catholic College Bendigo. After starting out with St Therese's Maroon, he played most of his junior football with the Sandhurst Football Club until he was chosen to play for the Bendigo Pioneers in the TAC Cup competition throughout 2005.

A lot of the old judges up here going back to when I played juniors believed the best junior to come out of Bendigo was Rod Ashman. But they were saying four or five years ago Joel was better than Ashy at the same age.

— Ray Byrne

Although his age made him ineligible to enter the 2005 AFL draft, Selwood's accomplishments during the year led to AFL Talent Manager Kevin Sheehan rating him "the best 17-year-old in Australia". Bendigo Pioneers regional manager Ray Byrne noted that "ability-wise, Joel was streets ahead of everyone. Even at an early age, he was a standout". Byrne praised Selwood's professionalism, writing that he had "never seen a kid prepare in the TAC Cup like Joel [Selwood]. He had a fantastic football brain, he could sort it out within 10 minutes of a game who should be where and [doing] what". Selwood received an array of accolades and honours as a bottom-aged player, winning mid-year State honours for Victoria Country in the AFL National Championships. His performances in the championships earned him end-of-year under-18 All-Australian honours and the Most Valuable Player award for Victoria Country. In addition, he was named in the TAC Cup Team of the Year, awarded a scholarship within the prestigious AIS-AFL Academy, and subsequently captained his older teammates in the annual under-18s International Rules Series in Ireland. His performances in Ireland earned him the Ron Barassi Medal as the adjudicated Most Valuable Player of the tour. Selwood's achievements in local football were recognised when he was listed as a finalist in the 2006 Bendigo Sports Star of the Year Award.

Returning in 2006 to the Pioneers, Selwood entered his final year of junior football as one of the top-rated prospects in his age group. His achievements at the junior level were recognised early by the AFL Players Association when he was awarded the Mike Fitzpatrick Scholarship and the AFL Life Members Education Fund Award. Rewarded with the captaincy of Bendigo for his final season, Selwood again won mid-year State honours for Victoria Country. However, he suffered a knee injury that occurred only six rounds into the competition, forcing him to undergo surgery. It was his fourth knee operation within two years, and it prematurely ended his season.

== AFL career ==
=== 2007–2008: AFL Rising Star winner, first premiership ===
==== 2007 ====
Selwood was drafted by the Geelong Football Club with their first selection, and was the seventh overall draft pick in the 2006 AFL draft. Although many recruiting scouts viewed him as "the finest pure footballer in the draft", and a potential top pick, there was still concern surrounding the durability of his knee. Nonetheless, as the equal-highest-ever draft pick for the Cats, Selwood made his debut in the opening round of the 2007 AFL season and missed only four games during the regular season.

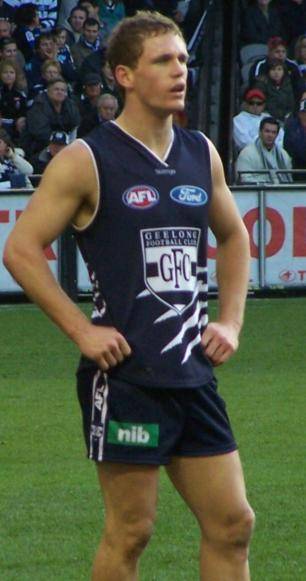
Selwood in 2007

Selwood's transition to the AFL drew positive comments throughout the footballing community; former Brisbane coach and Australian Football Legend Leigh Matthews noted how "from [his] first game ... he looked like he had played 200 of them". Geelong coach Mark Thompson labelled the 18-year-old Selwood the best youngster to have come under his tutelage during his time at the club. Geelong captain Tom Harley noted about the 18-year-old Selwood that "he's very confident, without a hint of arrogance". From the beginning, Selwood showed an ability to influence games; in just his fourth appearance, he led his older and more experienced teammates with a game of 25 disposals and nine tackles. This achievement, described as inspiring, earned him an AFL Rising Star Award nomination. The Geelong coaching staff had a highlights package made of this performance, to screen to the rest of the team during the match review later that week. Selwood's impact on the game as a first-year player prompted numerous comparisons to Chris Judd, who a few years earlier had been lauded for his first-year success as an 18-year-old.

At the conclusion of the 2007 home-and-away period, Selwood's regular contributions resulted in several individual accolades. Polling 44 out of a possible 45 votes, he was awarded the inaugural Ron Evans Medal as the winner of the AFL Rising Star Award. Selwood earned the maximum five votes from eight of the nine judges. Selwood was also awarded the prestigious AFLPA Best First-Year Player Award, winning over 70% of all votes from his peers. He became only the fourth player to win both the major awards for first-year players.

Having helped Geelong finish first on the ladder and win the McClelland Trophy, Selwood made his finals debut in the First Qualifying Final against the Kangaroos (now North Melbourne) at the Melbourne Cricket Ground (MCG). In front of nearly 80,000 spectators, Selwood amassed 22 disposals, five marks, five clearances, six inside-50s, five tackles, and five score assists, helping Geelong to a 106-point victory, the biggest finals win in Geelong's 110-year VFL/AFL history to that point. Although Selwood struggled to contribute in the Preliminary Final against Collingwood two weeks later in which they won by just 5 points, he returned to form for the 2007 AFL Grand Final at the MCG against Port Adelaide. With 18 disposals, five marks, five clearances—the most of any Geelong player—seven inside-50s, four tackles, and an equal game-high four score assists, Selwood helped the Cats to a record-breaking 119-point win, which remains the largest Grand Final margin in VFL/AFL history. At 19 years of age, Selwood became the youngest person to play in a winning Grand Final team in 10 years. He was also the first to win the AFL Rising Star Award and play in a premiership side within the same season, making him one of the most accomplished first-year players in league history. Selwood's debut-year achievements resulted in him becoming the highest-paid first-year player in AFL history.

There are very few that play like Joel Selwood plays and have such a dominant year ... to have that type of year, I think that's a bit of a rarity.

— Kevin Sheehan

Selwood finished the season ranked first among all first-year players in several major statistical categories: total possessions (405), disposals per game (19.3), kicks (216), handpasses (189), marks (109), tackles (94)—the most ever by any first-year AFL player—and tackles per game (4.5). His 23 score assists during the season also ranked him within the top ten in the league. Selwood added to his list of first-year honours at season's end with the Geelong Football Club Best First-Year Player Award, along with a top-20 placing in the Club Champion award. He also received several media end-of-year sporting awards.

==== 2008 ====
Selwood continued to establish himself as a key player in the Geelong midfield during the 2008 AFL season, helping the Cats achieve a record-equalling 21-win season and secure the McClelland Trophy for the second successive year. Selwood also claimed the third-longest all-time winning streak by an individual player in VFL/AFL history: 25 successive wins before a mid-season loss to Collingwood. His standout season was rewarded when he was selected to play for Victoria in the AFL Hall of Fame Tribute Match all-star game. In gaining selection for the Victorian team, Selwood, aged 19, became the youngest player to represent "The Big V" in more than 12 years (although the game itself had not been played in 9 years). He was also selected for the preliminary 2008 All-Australian squad, placed sixth for the Leigh Matthews Trophy as the AFLPA Most Valuable Player, and finished third in voting for the Robert Rose Most Courageous Player Award. Selwood also polled 19 votes in the Brownlow Medal, awarded to the "best and fairest" player in the AFL, to place fifth overall, and second among his teammates. Selwood's consistency and performances over his first two seasons was also recognised by the AFL Coaches Association, who awarded him the Best Young Player Award. Geelong qualified for the finals series and progressed to the Grand Final for the second consecutive year, but they were defeated by Hawthorn. Selwood's performance in the Grand Final, during which he gathered 29 disposals—including a team-high nine contested possessions—six marks, six tackles, and six inside-50s, were recognised as he placed fourth in Norm Smith Medal voting for best afield in the Grand Final.

Selwood's year, during which he averaged more than 25 disposals, 4 marks, and 4 tackles per game, was also rewarded with a top-five finish in the Carji Greeves Medal (Geelong's Best and Fairest). He finished the season ranked within the top ten in the league for possessions (613), disposals per game (25.5), and handpasses (327). His total of 63 free kicks earned during the season was also the highest recorded since the AFL era began in 1990, breaking the previous record of 54 set by Luke Darcy five years earlier.

With his rookie contract due to expire, concern mounted during the year over Geelong's ability to retain Selwood beyond the season. With almost half of their premiership-winning team out of contract, Geelong could only offer contracts paying significantly less than other clubs. However, Selwood signed a new two-year deal with the club, citing "club success and future opportunities" as his reasons for accepting the reduced salary.

=== 2009–2011: Second and third premierships ===
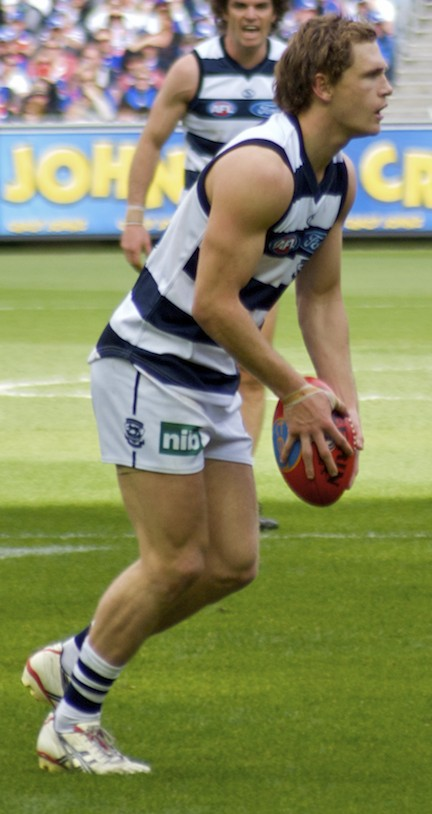
Selwood prepares to kick the football during a 2009 finals game.

==== 2009 ====
Before the 2009 AFL season, Selwood was appointed to the club's seven-man leadership group at just 20 years of age. After the 2008 AFL Grand Final loss ended Geelong's previous season, Selwood and his teammates began their 2009 campaign by capturing the pre-season NAB Cup for the second time in four years. Selwood's 33 disposals, 11 clearances, and 2 goals earned him the Michael Tuck Medal as the player adjudged best afield in this final. In Round 5, Selwood made his 50th senior appearance, setting a new VFL/AFL record for the highest percentage of wins with 50 games. His involvement in 46 victories set a winning percentage of 92 percent. In addition, Selwood's 50th appearance coincided with the club's own record-setting effort for the most successful 50-game stretch in VFL/AFL history. Geelong had won 47 out of 50 games—Selwood had been involved in 46—eclipsing Essendon's return of 46 wins and 4 losses during their dominant stretch from the 1999–2001 seasons.

During the Round 17 Grand Final rematch against Hawthorn, Selwood achieved career highs of 42 disposals, 10 marks, and 11 tackles. Geelong midfielder Cameron Ling described Selwood's performance as: "Absolutely amazing... He just single-handedly lifted the whole group with his intensity around the ball. It's surprising that he's only in his third year. He's something pretty special". Selwood helped Geelong compile an 18–4 win–loss record during the season to become the first team in league history to produce three consecutive home-and-away campaigns with 18 or more wins. Geelong qualified for the finals series in second position on the ladder before reaching the preliminary final for the third consecutive season. Selwood matched a career-high disposal tally for finals games with 29 disposals and 9 marks during the Cats' 73-point thrashing of Collingwood, leading the club to their third successive Grand Final appearance. During the Grand Final against St Kilda, Selwood addressed the playing group with a "stirring speech" as Geelong entered the half-time break trailing by 6 points. Teammate Andrew Mackie lauded Selwood as "a born leader" and credited the team's second-half turnaround to Selwood's reminder to "go back to basics and focus upon tackling". Selwood finished the game with 24 disposals—including a team-high 12 contested possessions and equal game-high 16 handpasses—4 marks, 6 clearances, a team-high 10 first possessions, 3 tackles, and 1 goal to help the Cats record a 12-point win and secure their second premiership in three seasons.

Selwood's standout year was recognised by his peers when he became the youngest-ever winner of the AFLPA Robert Rose Most Courageous Player Award, and placed fifth for the Leigh Matthews Trophy as the AFLPA Most Valuable Player. Selwood also finished sixth in the Brownlow Medal, polling 16 votes to finish second at Geelong behind eventual winner Gary Ablett Jr. He became the first footballer to win the Bendigo Sports Star of the Year Award, adding to his season's list of accolades. After averaging 28 disposals and 5 tackles per game over the course of the season, Selwood was also awarded with full All-Australian honours for the first time in his career and had a second successive top-five placing for the Carji Greeves Medal. Selwood finished the year ranked fourth in the league for total disposals (691), third for total handpasses (389), second for contested possessions (236) and eighth for hard-ball gets. For the second successive season, he also led the league for total free kicks earned (59) and finished the year ranked within the top five at Geelong in several major statistical categories.

==== 2010 ====
Prior to the 2010 AFL season, Selwood was retained as the youngest member of the club's revamped leadership group. Despite being unable to defend their NAB Cup title over the pre-season, Geelong re-signed Selwood to a new two-year contract with the club. Selwood highlighted his desire to "give a little bit back (to Geelong) by working hard and working through the next era of Geelong football". During the home-and-away campaign, Selwood set various personal milestones: in a Round 6 fixture against Richmond, Selwood made a career-high 29 handpasses—also the third-highest recorded in AFL history—while in a Round 19 match against Collingwood he gathered a career-high 20 contested possessions. In total, Selwood made 24 appearances during the season to help the club achieve a 17–5 record and qualify for the finals series in second position on the ladder. Geelong faced a 2009 Grand Final rematch against St Kilda during the first week of the finals series, and they were defeated in a Qualifying Final for the first time in four years. Selwood was restricted to just four disposals in the first half of the Qualifying Final loss, his lowest return in a half of football since his debut match in 2007. The following week, he responded with a 33-disposal Semi-Final performance to help Geelong defeat Fremantle and progress to the preliminary final. However, Geelong's 41-point defeat to Collingwood subsequently denied them a chance at a second consecutive Grand Final win.

Despite the club's lack of any trophies for the first time in four years, Selwood's individual season was recognised and rewarded on various fronts. He was once again nominated by his peers for both the AFLPA Most Valuable Player Award and the AFLPA Robert Rose Most Courageous Player Award, placing fifth and second overall, respectively. During the 2010 Brownlow Medal count, Selwood polled 21 votes to place fourth overall and second at Geelong, behind Gary Ablett Jr. (26 votes). Selwood was selected in the All-Australian team for the second successive year, and he also placed third in the AFL Coaches Association Champion Player of the Year Award. He also won his first Carji Greeves Medal, awarded for being the Geelong Football Club's best and fairest player during the 2010 season. Selwood finished the season ranked eighth in the league for total disposals (677), third for total handpasses (388)—also the 10th-highest tally in recorded VFL/AFL history—second for total free kicks earned (53), and seventh for total inside-50s (110). Selwood highlighted his consistency by gathering over 20 disposals in 21 of 24 games—11 of which were games with 30 or more disposals—and compiling a six-game streak during which he gathered over 30 possessions from Round 13 to Round 18.

==== 2011 ====
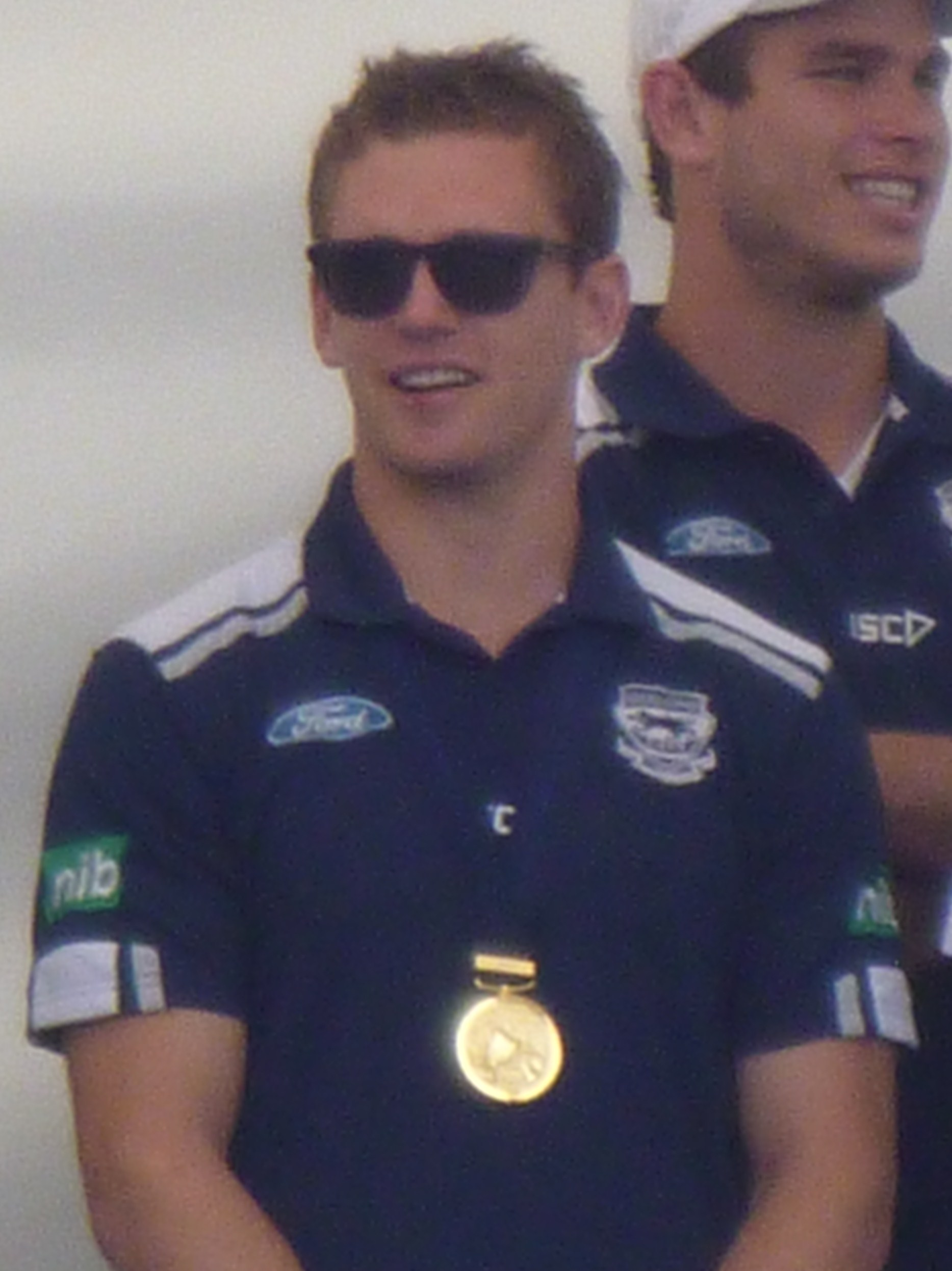
Selwood at Geelong's 2011 premiership parade

After serving for two years in the club's leadership group, Selwood was promoted to the vice-captaincy position for the 2011 AFL season. During the Round 8 match against Collingwood, Selwood made his 100th appearance for the club. He became the fifth-quickest player in VFL/AFL history to play 100 games, reaching the milestone four years and forty-two days after making his debut. Selwood's consistency was highlighted by his ability to play in 100 of a possible 106 games since entering the league. His record of 85 wins, together with his numerous awards and achievements, led to Hawthorn captain Luke Hodge proclaiming the milestone as "probably the most highly credentialed 100 games anyone has ever played. It is ridiculous.

Following the Round 12 match against Hawthorn, Selwood was reported for a striking offense against Brent Guerra and subsequently suspended for four matches. It was the first time Selwood had been reported and suspended during his career. Selwood continued to set various milestones throughout the season: he collected a career-high 43 disposals against Melbourne in Round 19, kicked a career-best 3 goals against Gold Coast in Round 20, and equalled a career-best 11 tackles in both Round 19 against Melbourne and Round 24 against Collingwood.

Selwood and Geelong finished the season with a 19–3 win–loss record to qualify for the finals series in second position on the ladder. Following consecutive wins against Hawthorn in the Qualifying Final and West Coast in the Preliminary Final, Geelong progressed through to the Grand Final against Collingwood. Selwood's performance in the final—during which he gathered a team-high 28 disposals, laid 7 tackles, and kicked 2 goals—were recognised as he placed runner-up in Norm Smith Medal voting for the adjudicated best afield player. Geelong defeated Collingwood to record a 38-point victory and earn Selwood his third premiership medallion in five seasons. Selwood was recognised with various nominations at the end of the season: he was named to the preliminary All-Australian squad, and he was once again nominated by his peers for both the AFLPA Most Valuable Player Award and the AFLPA Robert Rose Most Courageous Player Award. He collected at least 20 disposals in 18 of his 20 games for the season and ranked equal first for inside-50s (114) at the club.

=== 2012–2014: Captaining the Cats ===
==== 2012 ====
Following the retirement of Cameron Ling, Selwood was appointed as the club captain prior to the 2012 AFL season. His elevation made him the youngest captain of the Geelong Football Club in more than a decade. At the time of his appointment, Selwood admitted to "always wanting to lead the Geelong Football Club in a manner, if I was captain or not captain" and being driven to "want to make this football club successful for a long time". Geelong proceeded to re-sign Selwood on a five-year contract—the first time the club had handed out a long-term contract of that length since Gary Ablett Sr in 1987.

During the season, Geelong coach Chris Scott praised Selwood as "probably the toughest player I've ever seen...he gets hit in the head a lot...he just sees the ball and he puts his head down and he goes as hard as anyone possibly could". Despite Selwood's individual efforts, the Cats finished with a 15–7 win–loss record at the conclusion of the season to finish sixth on the ladder. This represented the first time in Selwood's career that the club had not qualified with a double chance for the finals series, setting them up for an Elimination Final match against Fremantle. Despite Selwood's contribution of a game-high 28 disposals and team-high six inside-50s, the Cats were defeated by 16 points and exited the finals series.

Selwood's performances throughout the season firmed his position as Geelong's top midfielder; he gathered more possessions than any of his teammates and ranked within the top ten throughout the league for clearances per game, contested possessions per game, and inside-50s per game—culminating in his second placing to Tom Hawkins for the Carji Greeves Medal and a nomination to the preliminary All-Australian squad. In 2012, he won the AFLPA Robert Rose Most Courageous Player Award for the second time in his career, sharing the honour with Beau Waters. His impressive first year as club captain was also recognised as he finished runner-up in the AFLPA Best Captain Award voting. Selwood's accomplishments and achievements at the club were honoured when he was presented with life membership of the Geelong Football Club after just six seasons.

==== 2013 ====
Selwood and Geelong began the 2013 AFL season on a seven-game winning streak before finishing with an improved 18–4 win–loss record to qualify in second position for the finals series. During the season, Selwood made his 150th appearance for the club and set a club record for the fastest 150 games played from debut (six years and one hundred and four days). In doing so, Selwood surpassed the previous record set by Jack Hawkins (seven years and four days). He also became the third youngest player (25 years, 48 days) in club history to reach 150 games, behind only Ken Newland (24 years, 85 days) and Gary Ablett Jr (24 years, 339 days). He also set a VFL/AFL record for the greatest winning percentage amongst 150 game players, having won 124 of his first 150 games (83% winning percentage) since debuting in 2007.

Following his 150th appearance, Selwood displayed an improved goal-kicking ability by kicking 17 goals in the remaining 7 games of the season. Coach Chris Scott acknowledged that Selwood had identified goal kicking as an area of improvement within his game, and credited Selwood for taking responsibility to work hard and improve at it. Geelong began their finals series against Fremantle in a Qualifying Final, but they were defeated by 15 points. The defeat forced the club into a Semi-Final against Port Adelaide, the first finals game between both clubs since the 2007 AFL Grand Final. Selwood contributed 27 disposals, 4 marks, and 4 tackles to lead Geelong to a 16-point victory—his first finals win as captain. The win ensured Geelong's progression through to the preliminary final against Hawthorn, to play-off for a position in the 2013 AFL Grand Final. Despite Selwood's contribution of 23 disposals, 4 tackles, and 1 goal, however, the Cats were defeated by 5 points and finished the season in third place.

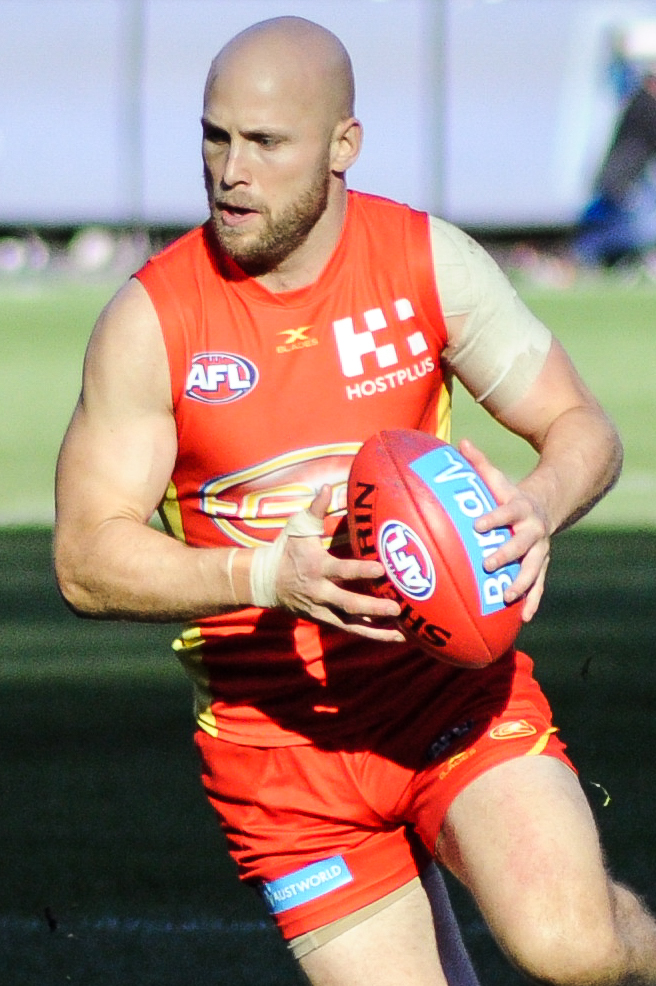
In 2013, former teammate Gary Ablett Jr, seen here playing for Gold Coast Suns, was the only person stopping Selwood from winning both the AFLPA Most Valuable Player Award and the 2013 Brownlow Medal

Selwood's elevated performances throughout the season were recognised and rewarded through several end-of-season awards. He was named for the third time as an All-Australian as the starting centreman and honoured with the captaincy of the All-Australian team for the first time in his career. He won his first-ever AFLPA Best Captain Award whilst also being honoured with his second consecutive—and third overall—AFLPA Robert Rose Award as the adjudicated most courageous player. Selwood also placed as the runner-up to former teammate Gary Ablett Jr for both the AFLPA Most Valuable Player Award and the 2013 Brownlow Medal, his highest placing for both individual awards. He polled a career-best 27 votes for the Brownlow Medal, just one vote shy of Ablett Jr. He also finished third in the AFL Coaches Association Champion Player of the Year Award. Having finished the season at the club with the most clearances (128), second-most disposals (615), second-most tackles (140), second-most inside-50s (103), fourth-most goals (30), and third-most goal assists (20), he was awarded a second Carji Greeves Medal.

==== 2014 ====
Despite a hamstring injury during the 2014 pre-season, Selwood made a recovery to lead Geelong to an unbeaten record over the first five rounds of the 2014 home-and-away period. He averaged over 27 disposals, 6 tackles, and a goal during the winning streak until the club suffered their first loss for the season against Port Adelaide in round six. Geelong were defeated a further three times over the following two months, coinciding with Selwood's lower averages of 19 disposals and 4 tackles a game. Despite his overall inconsistent performances, Selwood was praised for his ability to make key contributions during games; he kicked the winning goal against Carlton in Round 12 and scored 3 goals against St Kilda in Round 13 from only 11 disposals. Coach Chris Scott lauded him as having "a mark of a great player" who could "find a way to change things ... and play his best when the game was demanding it" even after "struggling at times within games and when it seemingly isn’t going [his] way". Carlton coach Mick Malthouse similarly praised Selwood as "an outstanding player ... he wills his side to win" and the player he would pick to have in his own team if given the choice. Selwood and the Cats finished the season with a 17–5 win–loss record to qualify in third position for the finals series. In the Qualifying Final against Hawthorn, Selwood gathered 31 disposals, 16 contested possessions, 9 clearances, 6 tackles, and 3 goals but was unable to prevent a 36-point defeat. Needing to defeat North Melbourne in the Semi-Final to remain in the finals, Selwood accumulated 24 disposals, a game-high 16 contested possessions, a game-high 11 clearances, and 8 tackles. However, he was again unable to prevent a 6-point defeat, and Geelong were eliminated from the finals series. The loss was the first time that Selwood had experienced consecutive defeats in a finals series with Geelong.

Despite his team's exit from the finals series, Selwood was recognised and rewarded for his individual season through several end-of-season awards. He was named to his fourth overall All-Australian team as the starting ruck-rover, and he was honoured with the captaincy for the second successive season. He also won his third consecutive, and fourth overall, AFLPA Robert Rose Award as the adjudicated most courageous player. In addition, he placed second for the AFLPA Best Captain Award, eighth overall for the AFLPA Most Valuable Player Award, seventh in voting for the AFL Coaches Association Champion Player of the Year Award, and tied for fifth overall in the Brownlow Medal. Selwood's 21 votes in the 2014 Brownlow Medal count saw him set a new club record for most career Brownlow Medal votes by a Geelong player. With 137 votes across 8 seasons, he ranked ahead of Garry Hocking, who had previously held the club record with 133 votes in 15 seasons. His role throughout the season was demonstrated as he led the team in total disposals (614), tackles (144), clearances (153), and inside-50s (100) while kicking the third-most goals (24) and providing the second-most goal assists (20). In recognition, he won the club Coach's Award as well as his second consecutive Carji Greeves Medal. He became the seventh player in the club's history to win at least three Carji Greeves Medals.

During the off-season, Selwood was appointed as the national team captain of Australia for the 2014 International Rules Series against Ireland. Playing in the midfield, Selwood kicked one over in the lone Test match and led Australia to a 56–46 win against Ireland. Winning their 20th Test match against Ireland, Australia reclaimed the Cormac McAnallen Trophy for the first time since 2010.

=== 2015–2019: Missed Finals series, three Preliminary Finals defeats ===
==== 2015 ====
In the 2015 AFL season, Selwood produced several strong performances early in the season despite the team's shaky start. Against Gold Coast in Round 3, Selwood led Geelong to a 9-point win with 38 disposals—23 of which were contested possessions—8 clearances, 6 tackles, 5 inside-50s, and a goal. His performance prompted his teammate Mitch Duncan to declare him as "an extraordinary player" whilst his coach Scott suggested that "his teammates should consider it a privilege to be playing alongside him". In Round 19 against Sydney, Selwood made his 200th appearance for the club and led Geelong to victory with 35 disposals, 6 marks, and 6 inside-50s. His milestone appearance at 27 years of age made him the youngest player in club history to play 200 games. He also became the fourth-fastest player in VFL/AFL history to play 200 games after achieving the milestone in 8 years and 129 days. With the departure of several experienced teammates over the previous three seasons, Selwood was responsible for leading an inexperienced midfield throughout the season. Often matched up against opposition taggers and receiving minimal support, Selwood struggled with consistency. Despite leading the team in several statistical categories and averaging career highs in clearances, Selwood recorded his lowest disposal average since his first year as well as his lowest disposal efficiency, lowest uncontested possession average, and highest clanger average of his career. His inconsistent performances coincided with Geelong consequently finishing the year in tenth place with an 11–1–10 win–draw–loss record, thus missing out on qualifying for the finals series for the first and (what ended up being) only time in Selwood's career. Selwood also failed to be nominated into the All-Australian squad or final team for the first time since his debut season. However, he still finished third for the AFLPA Most Courageous Player Award.

==== 2016 ====
Geelong were again one of the better teams in the 2016 AFL season. Selwood was joined in the midfield by Patrick Dangerfield, an established star who was traded from Adelaide. Selwood also had the opportunity to play with younger brother Scott, who joined the team from West Coast. Despite winning their last seven games of the home-and-away rounds, Geelong finished 2016 only tied with Sydney and Hawthorn for the best win–loss record of 17–5 and were second on the ladder behind Sydney because of the percentage tiebreak criteria. Against Hawthorn, the three-time reigning premiers, Geelong won their Qualifying Final by two points after Hawthorn's Isaac Smith missed a kick at goal after the siren—only the second time a player has failed to convert a win from a shot after the siren in finals football. Selwood was rated Geelong's best afield with 26 disposals, second to Dangerfield, and one goal. After Sydney were upset in their Qualifying Final, Geelong had to face Sydney in the Preliminary Final and lost by a 37-point margin in spite of Selwood and Dangerfield both having 39 disposals, which was Selwood's season high, and Selwood's finals record of 23 contested possessions. Selwood also had a career-best 13 tackles in the game.

Selwood was named to the All-Australian team for the fifth time, and he was named captain of the team for the third time, having been recognized for leading his team back to the finals. He led the league in free kicks won, was tied for fourth in clearances, and was tenth in inside-50s. Selwood also had a career-best season average of 28.3 disposals per game. He finished fifth in the AFLPA Best Captain voting. Selwood had 18 votes for the Brownlow Medal, second on the team behind Dangerfield, who won the award and credited Selwood as one of the key reasons for his improved performance.

==== 2017 ====
During the 2017 AFL season, Selwood had a better first half of the year, polling all 13 of his Brownlow votes in the first eleven rounds. One of his best performances came in Round 5 against St Kilda when he matched his career-best disposal count with 43. Selwood left the Round 14 game against Fremantle after a concussion in the first minute. He also missed the last three games of the season after suffering an ankle injury against Sydney that required surgery. For the second consecutive year, Geelong finished the home-and-away rounds tied for the best win–loss record but were again second on the ladder, this time behind Adelaide. Geelong played three lopsided finals. They lost their home Qualifying Final to the eventual premiers Richmond by 51 points, and Selwood struggled in particular with just 19 disposals as he returned from injury. They bounced back to win their Semi-Final against Sydney by 59 points, although Selwood again did not play a key role in the game. Selwood had a better game in the preliminary final against minor premiers Adelaide with 34 disposals and a goal, but he could not prevent a 61-point defeat.

Despite missing several games, Selwood was named to the All-Australian team for the sixth time, this time not as a starter but in the interchange. He finished second in the voting for the AFLPA Most Courageous Player Award, and third for the AFLPA Best Captain Award. In the off-season, Selwood rejoined the national team for the 2017 International Rules Series. Australia won both Tests of the series to retake the Cormac McAnallen Cup, though Selwood received a black card and was sent off in the second Test for knocking Chris Barrett to the ground with a high hit after Barrett had already disposed of the ball.

==== 2018 ====
Geelong entered the 2018 AFL season with Gary Ablett Jr, a two-time Brownlow winner, returning to the club and joining Selwood and Dangerfield in the midfield. Selwood began the season by playing his 250th game in Round 1 against Melbourne, becoming the third-quickest player to reach the milestone in VFL/AFL history, behind only Wayne Schimmelbusch and Adam Goodes. He had a season-best 39 disposals in his milestone game, which Geelong won by three points. Despite this initial success and the promise for the season, Geelong missed out on the double chance for just the third time in Selwood's career as they finished eight on the ladder and barely made the finals. Geelong exited the finals series in the first week with an Elimination Final loss to Melbourne by 29 points. Selwood's poor performance while being tagged by Melbourne's James Harmes was regarded as a key factor in the game. Although Selwood finished with 25 disposals, he only had 14 through the first three quarters when Haynes was tagging him. Despite Geelong's struggles in the home-and-away rounds, Selwood was praised for his performance and leadership throughout the season. He finished fourth in the AFLPA Best Captain Award voting. He accrued 14 Brownlow votes to tie for the second-most votes on the team, behind the 17 votes Dangerfield polled. This was the last of Selwood's eleven consecutive seasons of polling double-digit Brownlow votes. He only ranked fifth in the Carji Greeves Medal voting.

==== 2019 ====
Geelong recovered in the 2019 AFL season and were on top of the ladder for nearly all of the home-and-away rounds. They fell to second behind the Brisbane Lions in the penultimate round, but they still finished as minor premiers after Brisbane lost the last round and Geelong had the best point percentage among the three clubs with a 16–6 win–loss record. It was the third McClelland Trophy of Selwood's career. Although Geelong had success, Selwood began showing signs of decline, only recording 27 disposals or more twice in the home-and-away rounds after averaging 27 disposals in the previous season. Despite their minor premiership, Geelong lost their Qualifying Final to Collingwood by 10 points; Selwood was not a key factor, only collecting 18 disposals. The Cats recovered to win their Semi-Final against West Coast by 20 points. Selwood dominated the first half and finished with 26 disposals as well as a goal. Geelong again exited the finals in the preliminary final stage with a 19-point defeat to the eventual premiers, Richmond; nevertheless, Selwood had a good performance in the game with 30 disposals. It was Geelong's third preliminary final loss in four years. Nonetheless, Selwood had his third- and fourth-best disposal tallies of the year in these last two finals.

=== 2020–2022: Grand Final returns and retirement ===
==== 2020 ====
Selwood played his 300th game in Round 5, 2020, against Gold Coast, becoming just the fifth Geelong player in Geelong's 123-year history in the VFL/AFL to that point to reach the milestone. Geelong won the game to maintain Selwood's perfect record of winning all six of his milestone games for each of his successive 50 games. Selwood missed successive games twice during the season, two games in the middle due to a hamstring injury and four games towards the end with a knee injury. Geelong finished fourth on the ladder with a 12–5 win–loss record. Although they lost their Qualifying Final to Port Adelaide, they won their Semi-Final against Collingwood by 68 points and then ended their preliminary final losing streak with a win over the Brisbane Lions by 40 points to advance to their first Grand Final since 2011. Selwood kicked one of Geelong's just five goals in the loss to Port Adelaide. He wasn't among Geelong's best players in either of the finals wins. Geelong lost the Grand Final to the reigning premiers Richmond by 31 points, after only trailing by two points at three-quarter time. Selwood had a better performance in the loss, gaining Geelong's second-highest total of 21 disposals and a team-high 6 clearances.

==== 2021 ====
Geelong were in contention for the minor premiership in the 2021 AFL season, which would go to the winner of their last home-and-away round against Melbourne. Despite 28 disposals and a goal from Selwood as well as building up a 44-point lead, they lost the game on a goal after the siren and finished third behind Melbourne and Port Adelaide. Selwood only missed one game during season, not playing Round 17 due to rest and not an injury. He had a season-high 39 disposals in Round 10 against Gold Coast. For the second year in a row, Geelong lost their Qualifying Final against Port Adelaide, but they still made it to the Preliminary Final stage with a convincing 35-point win over Greater Western Sydney. Selwood became Geelong's games record holder in the Semi-Final, surpassing his former teammate Corey Enright with his 333rd game for the club. In their Preliminary Final, they lost a rematch against Melbourne in a lopsided manner by 83 points. Selwood nonetheless had a good performance with 24 disposals and 8 clearances. Selwood finished fourth in the voting for AFLPA Best Captain.

==== 2022 ====
An extremely strong 2022 AFL season saw Geelong win 16 games in a row to finish as both the minor premiers and the eventual 2022 premiers. Selwood was an integral part of the playing group; however, being a senior player, he was rested periodically throughout the season and had managed game time, which occasionally included starting the game on the bench. As his 11th, and final, season as captain, Selwood remained crucial to the team's leadership and success, and he was awarded the Jim Stynes Community Leadership Award for his dedication and commitment to a slew of community engagements, including Geelong Football Club's community commitments, AFL Barwon Access All-Abilities Auskick Clinics, GMHBA Health Heroes, his NAB Auskick ambassadorship, and his role as ambassador for the Cotton On Foundation. In Round 3, Selwood broke Stephen Kernahan's record for the most games played as an AFL captain in a thrilling 13-point victory over Collingwood. After over a decade of constant heartbreak in finals, Selwood finally achieved his fourth premiership—his first as captain. His 2022 Grand Final appearance marked his 40th final—the most finals played by any AFL player ever. He remained highly effective in the 81-point demolition of the Sydney Swans, recording 26 disposals (12 in the first quarter) and an emotional fourth-quarter goal.

Selwood announced his retirement from AFL less than a week following the Grand Final victory. His choice to retire was kept secret from the majority of the playing group for the purpose of maintaining the group's focus on pursuing the premiership. He became the third consecutive Geelong captain to retire following a premiership.

== Player profile ==
He's the type of player I look at from afar and say, 'I'd love to be in the trenches with him'. I love how hard he is at the footy, how humble he is ... He can play inside or outside and can use the footy ... He's going to go down as one of the greats of the last 10 years. With [James] Hird, [Mark] Ricciuto, [Nathan] Buckley and those sort of guys ... [He's in the] same mould as [Michael] Voss.

— Brett Kirk

Selwood spent the majority of his career playing as an inside midfielder.

Having ranked highly across numerous major statistical categories from his first year, Selwood is considered one of the most consistent and well-rounded players to have ever played at the highest level. Regarded as one of the league's most physical and tough players, he has been praised for playing "with a physicality and intensity that is the benchmark of the competition". He has also gained a reputation as one of the league's most courageous players, highlighted by his four Robert Rose Awards. His physical and courageous approach, however, has resulted in various concussion or head-related injuries during his career. This has prompted commentary regarding Selwood's long-term well-being as well as debate about his tactics for drawing free kicks.

Because of his aggressive style of play, Selwood has gathered a reputation as a "head-over-the-ball specialist" and for consistently putting himself in positions to break tackles and win free kicks. His ability to "buckle his knees, (get) down and pull his arm up so that the tackler's arm goes up above the neck" has been declared by former Hawthorn captain Shane Crawford as "almost impossible to stop at times" and is reflected in his regular standing among league leaders for total free kicks received. It has also led to opposition players noting specific techniques to tackling Selwood—Carlton's Kade Simpson admitted it was important to "get in low" because "he’s such a master at lifting the elbows, which tries to slip the tackle up around the neck ... there’s no doubt it’s a skill". Selwood has declared the technique as a "benefit and an advantage I’m getting at the moment on someone else because I see a weakness in what they are doing ... the majority of the time they are doing 95 per cent of the tackle right. It’s just that five per cent where I can use my upper body strength, I can dip at the knees slightly". Former Brisbane Lions captain Michael Voss agrees, stating: "all he’s doing is keeping his feet, dropping his legs and he’s got a fantastic tenchique [sic] in rolling his shoulder ... Selwood shouldn’t be penalised because he’s stronger than the tackler. If I was playing today and I could develop that technique, I'd be looking at it".

Selwood's leadership ability has consistently been praised, culminating in his appointment as club captain at the age of 23 and captaining the national team at the age of 26 for the 2014 International Rules Series. On the field, he is noted for his ability to regularly inspire teammates by "leading not just with his voice but with his actions". Hall of Fame member Wayne Carey regards Selwood as a "once-in-a-generation leader" and the league's "greatest current-day match-winner" during Selwood's playing career.

Off the field, he has been praised by teammates for his professionalism in driving standards and attention to preparation. Selwood has summarised his leadership style on the field as "getting into that emotional state where you'd just do anything for your teammates", and off the field as "caring for your teammates and making sure they're OK and you're making them better people". He considers his two immediate predecessors at Geelong, Tom Harley and Cameron Ling, as his greatest role models for leadership, having played under both. Melbourne captain Nathan Jones declared that Selwood's leadership qualities were those he respected and strove to emulate as a fellow AFL captain.

Selwood has stated his career intention to "work really hard on the basics". Despite admitting to being "not the fastest player, or most skillful", his hard running, tackling and one-percent plays were important elements to his overall game. He has the most tackles in VFL/AFL history, having surpassed Matt Priddis's previous record of 1,629 in Round 7 of the 2021 season. Footballing experts have praised his decision-making ability when considering his overall productivity with the football, with Leigh Matthews complimenting Selwood as "the best wet-weather player in the game".

== Personal life ==
Selwood is married to Brit Davis, a model and special education teacher. They have two sons. Selwood had three brothers, all having been listed with AFL clubs: two older brothers, twins Adam (1984–2025) and Troy (1984–2025), and a younger brother, Scott.

Since winning the AFL Rising Star Award sponsored by the National Australia Bank (NAB), Selwood has been involved in several promotions for the bank, including in an ambassadorial role and in several television advertisement appearances. He is also an ambassador for Auskick, the AFL's junior development program that is sponsored by NAB, annually acting as a mentor for the junior player deemed 'Auskicker of the Year'. Along with his parents and brothers, Selwood works on behalf of the Seeing Eye Dogs Association (SEDA) organisation. Selwood and his family sponsor pups who are being trained as a guide dogs, including one named "Selwood" in his family's honour. SEDA has said that the family's widespread dispersal around Australia, with Adam and Scott in Western Australia while Joel and Troy remain in Victoria, has helped to publicise the organisation's nationwide activity. During the 2010 season, Selwood was officially appointed as the club's community ambassador for various charitable community activities. Selwood subsequently became the public face of both the Cotton On Foundation and its sponsorship for the rebuilding of the children's ward at Geelong Hospital.

A lifelong supporter of the Geelong Football Club, Selwood cites the club's own Hall of Fame member Gary Ablett Sr as a childhood idol, along with Sydney players Paul Kelly and Brett Kirk. Prior to the 2009 AFL season, Selwood was elected to the AFL Players Association committee as the Geelong alternate delegate representative. He has had several endorsement and promotional deals with various companies, including Asics and Smith's. Selwood also features in a special-edition Monopoly AFL Premiership game board, occupying Bow Street.

== Post-playing career ==
Following his retirement from AFL in 2022, Selwood took up a leadership coaching position with the Melbourne Storm.

In 2023, Selwood joined Talking Footy Finals with Network Seven to discuss the first week of finals.

At the end of 2023, Selwood was announced as the namesake for Kardinia Park’s new grandstand. Selwood was also appointed to the AFL’s football operations department for 2024.

Selwood is a part of the Network Seven commentary panel for its AFL coverage, serving as a special comments analyst. He is also an expert analyst on 3AW Football.

== Statistics ==
Updated to the end of the 2022 season.

Legend
| G | Goals | K | Kicks | D | Disposals | T | Tackles |
| B | Behinds | H | Handballs | M | Marks |
| # | Played in that season's premiership team |

| Season | Team | No. | Games | Totals | | | | | | | Averages (per game) | | | | | | | Votes |
| Season | Team | No. | Games | G | B | K | H | D | M | T | G | B | K | H | D | M | T | Votes |
|---|---|---|---|---|---|---|---|---|---|---|---|---|---|---|---|---|---|---|
| 2007^{#} | Geelong | 14 | 21 | 7 | 8 | 215 | 189 | 404 | 109 | 95 | 0.3 | 0.4 | 10.2 | 9.0 | 19.2 | 5.2 | 4.5 | 2 |
| 2008 | Geelong | 14 | 24 | 6 | 9 | 283 | 324 | 607 | 102 | 78 | 0.3 | 0.4 | 11.8 | 13.5 | 25.3 | 4.3 | 3.3 | 19 |
| 2009^{#} | Geelong | 14 | 25 | 11 | 10 | 301 | 386 | 687 | 111 | 118 | 0.4 | 0.4 | 12.0 | 15.4 | 27.5 | 4.4 | 4.7 | 16 |
| 2010 | Geelong | 14 | 24 | 9 | 10 | 289 | 388 | 677 | 112 | 126 | 0.4 | 0.4 | 12.0 | 16.2 | 28.2 | 4.7 | 5.3 | 21 |
| 2011^{#} | Geelong | 14 | 20 | 15 | 12 | 296 | 222 | 518 | 82 | 125 | 0.8 | 0.6 | 14.8 | 11.1 | 25.9 | 4.1 | 6.3 | 17 |
| 2012 | Geelong | 14 | 21 | 13 | 12 | 293 | 246 | 539 | 74 | 118 | 0.6 | 0.6 | 14.0 | 11.7 | 25.7 | 3.5 | 5.6 | 14 |
| 2013 | Geelong | 14 | 25 | 30 | 16 | 307 | 308 | 615 | 102 | 140 | 1.2 | 0.6 | 12.3 | 12.3 | 24.6 | 4.1 | 5.6 | 27 |
| 2014 | Geelong | 14 | 24 | 24 | 16 | 311 | 303 | 614 | 109 | 144 | 1.0 | 0.7 | 13.0 | 12.6 | 25.6 | 4.5 | 6.0 | 21 |
| 2015 | Geelong | 14 | 20 | 14 | 8 | 237 | 254 | 491 | 61 | 124 | 0.7 | 0.4 | 11.8 | 12.7 | 24.6 | 3.0 | 6.2 | 13 |
| 2016 | Geelong | 14 | 24 | 9 | 12 | 341 | 338 | 679 | 83 | 139 | 0.4 | 0.5 | 14.2 | 14.1 | 28.3 | 3.5 | 5.8 | 18 |
| 2017 | Geelong | 14 | 21 | 7 | 4 | 247 | 289 | 536 | 67 | 107 | 0.3 | 0.2 | 11.8 | 13.8 | 25.5 | 3.2 | 5.1 | 13 |
| 2018 | Geelong | 14 | 23 | 7 | 13 | 298 | 323 | 621 | 94 | 124 | 0.3 | 0.6 | 13.0 | 14.0 | 27.0 | 4.1 | 5.4 | 14 |
| 2019 | Geelong | 14 | 23 | 6 | 6 | 275 | 214 | 489 | 79 | 94 | 0.3 | 0.3 | 12.0 | 9.3 | 21.3 | 3.4 | 4.1 | 3 |
| 2020 (Note: The 2020 season was played with 17 home-and-away matches per team (down from 22) and 16-minute quarters with time on (down from 20-minute quarters with time on) due to the impact of the COVID-19 pandemic.) | Geelong | 14 | 15 | 4 | 4 | 138 | 120 | 258 | 37 | 63 | 0.3 | 0.3 | 9.2 | 8.0 | 17.2 | 2.5 | 4.2 | 3 |
| 2021 | Geelong | 14 | 24 | 6 | 4 | 278 | 274 | 552 | 77 | 113 | 0.3 | 0.2 | 11.6 | 11.4 | 23.0 | 3.2 | 4.7 | 9 |
| 2022^{#} | Geelong | 14 | 21 | 7 | 3 | 238 | 221 | 459 | 67 | 91 | 0.3 | 0.1 | 11.3 | 10.5 | 21.9 | 3.2 | 4.3 | 4 |
| Career | | | 355 | 175 | 147 | 4347 | 4399 | 8746 | 1366 | 1799 | 0.5 | 0.4 | 12.2 | 12.4 | 24.6 | 3.8 | 5.1 | 214 |

== Honours and achievements ==
Team

- 4× AFL Premiership (Geelong): 2007, 2009, 2011, 2022
- 4× McClelland Trophy (Geelong): 2007, 2008, 2019, 2022
- NAB Cup (Geelong): 2009
- 2× Cormac McAnallen Cup (Australia): 2014, 2017

Individual

- 6× All-Australian: 2009, 2010, 2013 (C), 2014 (C), 2016 (C), 2017
- 3× Carji Greeves Medal: 2010, 2013, 2014
- AFLPA Best Captain Award: 2013
- 4× AFLPA Robert Rose Most Courageous Player Award: 2009, 2012, 2013, 2014
- Michael Tuck Medal: 2009
- AFLCA Best Young Player Award: 2008
- AFL Rising Star Award: 2007
- AFLPA Best First-Year Player Award: 2007
- 2× Peter Badcoe VC Medal: 2016, 2018
- 5× Geelong F.C. Most club votes in Brownlow Medal: 2011, 2012, 2013, 2014, 2015
- Geelong F.C. Coach's Award: 2014
- 2× Geelong F.C. Tom Harley Award for Best Clubman: 2011, 2013
- 3× Geelong F.C. Community Champion Award: 2011, 2020, 2022
- Geelong F.C. Best First Year Player Award: 2007
- Captain of Australia in International Rules Series: 2014
- Victorian Representative Honours in AFL Hall of Fame Tribute Match: 2008
- 2× K-Rock Geelong Football Player of the Year: 2013, 2014
- Bendigo Sports Star of the Year Award: 2009
- Fox Sports Best First-Year Player Award: 2007
- Captain of Geelong F.C.: 2012–2022
- Vice-captain of Geelong F.C.: 2011
- Geelong F.C. Life Membership Inductee: 2012

Other achievements

- Only player in VFL/AFL history to win the AFL Rising Star Award and play in an AFL premiership within the same year: 2007
- Only Geelong player to win the AFL Rising Star Award: 2007
- Third-longest all-time streak for most consecutive victories by an AFL player (25 wins): 2008
- Fifth-fastest player in VFL/AFL history to reach 100 senior games (4 years and 42 days after debut): 2011
- Most career-polled Brownlow votes by a Geelong player (137 votes): 2014
- Youngest player in Geelong history to play 200 senior games (27 years of age): 2015
- Fourth-fastest player in VFL/AFL history to reach 200 senior games (8 years and 129 days after debut): 2015
- Most finals played in VFL/AFL history (40)
- Equal-most finals series played (15), shared with Dick Lee and Michael Tuck
- Fourth-most wins in VFL/AFL history (259 wins; 72.96% win rate)
- Only 4-time premiership player for Geelong (2007, 2009, 2011, 2022.)

== See also ==
- List of Australian rules football families
- List of AFL debuts in 2007
- List of Geelong Football Club individual awards and records
