= Adam Selwood =

Australian rules footballer (1984–2025)

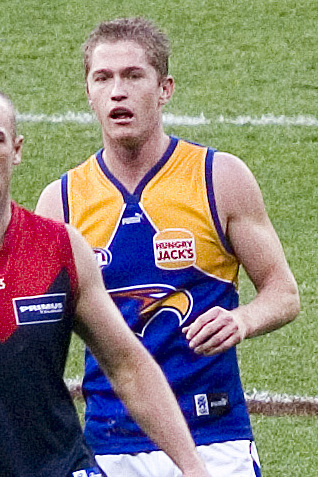
- Selwood with West Coast in 2005

Personal information
- Full name: Adam Murray Selwood
- Born: 1 May 1984; Bendigo, Victoria, Australia
- Died: 17 May 2025 (aged 41); Herdsman, Western Australia, Australia
- Original team: Bendigo Pioneers (TAC Cup)
- Draft: 53rd overall, 2002 National Draft
- Height: 189 cm (6 ft 2 in)
- Weight: 84 kg (185 lb)
- Positions: Tagger, half-back flanker

Playing career
Years	Club	Games (Goals)
2003–2013	West Coast	187 (43)

International team honours
Years	Team	Games (Goals)
2006–2008	Australia	4 (0)

Career highlights
- West Coast premiership player 2006; AFL Rising Star nominee 2005

Adam Murray Selwood (1 May 1984 – 17 May 2025) was an Australian rules footballer who played 11 seasons for the West Coast Eagles in the Australian Football League (AFL). Originally from Bendigo, Victoria, Selwood was recruited by West Coast in the third round of the 2002 National Draft. He made his debut for the club in 2003, and received a nomination for the AFL Rising Star two seasons later, in 2005. Alternating between midfield and defensive roles, Selwood played in West Coast's 2006 premiership win over Sydney, and also represented Australia in the 2008 International Rules Series against Ireland. He retired at the end of the 2013 season, having played 187 games for the club.

== Early life ==
Selwood was born in Bendigo, Victoria.

== Career ==
Selwood played under-18 football for the Bendigo Pioneers in the TAC Cup.

Selwood was recruited as the West Coast Eagles' third pick, and number 53 overall, in the 2002 AFL draft. In 2003, his debut season, Selwood played two games, including the losing elimination final against Adelaide. He played three games in 2004 before osteitis pubis curtailed his season.

In 2005, Selwood played 21 matches and received a rising star nomination in round 16. He was knocked unconscious in a collision with Adelaide captain Mark Ricciuto in round 22, but the forced rest helped Selwood to recover from compartment syndrome. He returned in the preliminary final against Adelaide and played in the grand final against Sydney, which the Eagles lost by four points.

In 2006, Selwood cemented his place in the Eagles' starting 22, and he built a reputation as a defensive midfielder. He played in all of the 26 games for West Coast in 2006 and was part of the premiership team.

On 14 April 2007, Selwood was involved in an altercation with Fremantle's Des Headland. Both appeared before the AFL Tribunal on 18 April. Headland was charged with two counts of striking Selwood, and one count of wrestling with him, while Selwood was charged with using insulting language towards Headland. The tribunal found Selwood not guilty of using insulting language. It found Headland guilty of two of the three charges but elected not to impose a penalty.

Selwood finished third in West Coast's club champion awards in both 2007 and 2008. He played all 22 games in 2008 and was a vice captain of the Australian team that played Ireland in the International Rules series.

In July 2012, after missing two games with a serious arm infection, the Eagles opted to have Selwood assigned to the WAFL where he played for the East Perth Football Club for the first time in five years.

Selwood retired at the end of the 2013 AFL season, having played 187 games for the Eagles over 11 seasons. He claimed the Chris Mainwaring Medal in 2013 as the West Coast Eagles best clubman award. He played for East Perth in the 2013 WAFL Grand Final, where he had 32 touches and 10 clearances in a 49-point loss to West Perth.

== Post-playing career ==
Following his playing career, Selwood remained with the West Coast Eagles as a development coach and became the inaugural Head of Female Football, setting up the club's AFLW team.

== Statistics ==
Legend
G	Goals	K	Kicks	D	Disposals	T	Tackles
B	Behinds	H	Handballs	M	Marks

Season	Team	No.	Games	Totals							Averages (per game)							Votes
Season	Team	No.	Games	G	B	K	H	D	M	T	G	B	K	H	D	M	T	Votes
2003	West Coast	37	2	0	0	9	11	20	4	3	0.0	0.0	4.5	5.5	10.0	2.0	1.5	0
2004	West Coast	37	3	2	1	24	15	39	11	7	0.7	0.3	8.0	5.0	13.0	3.7	2.3	0
2005	West Coast	37	20	6	5	179	109	288	78	50	0.3	0.3	9.0	5.5	14.4	3.9	2.5	0
2006	West Coast	37	26	8	6	267	239	506	147	72	0.3	0.2	10.3	9.2	19.5	5.7	2.8	0
2007	West Coast	37	23	1	2	208	259	467	142	60	0.0	0.1	9.0	11.3	20.3	6.2	2.6	5
2008	West Coast	37	22	7	6	230	161	391	110	47	0.3	0.3	10.5	7.3	17.8	5.0	2.1	0
2009	West Coast	37	21	8	7	231	284	515	84	76	0.4	0.3	11.0	13.5	24.5	4.0	3.6	4
2010	West Coast	37	16	6	5	179	200	379	74	68	0.4	0.3	11.2	12.5	23.7	4.6	4.3	0
2011	West Coast	37	25	3	4	245	185	430	102	57	0.1	0.2	9.8	7.4	17.2	4.1	2.3	0
2012	West Coast	37	20	2	1	155	117	272	70	42	0.1	0.1	7.8	5.9	13.6	3.5	2.1	0
2013	West Coast	37	9	0	0	61	38	99	21	13	0.0	0.0	6.8	4.2	11.0	2.3	1.4	0
Career			187	43	37	1788	1618	3406	843	495	0.2	0.2	9.6	8.7	18.2	4.5	2.6	9

== Personal life and death ==
A member of the Selwood family, Selwood had three brothers: twin brother Troy (1984–2025), Joel, and Scott. Selwood had two children. He was found dead during a welfare check by police on 17 May 2025, aged 41, in Herdsman, Western Australia, three months after Troy had died by suicide. It would later be revealed Adam had also died by suicide.

Selwood achieved a Bachelor of Commerce degree from Curtin University.

=== Advocacy ===
In June 2007, Selwood, alongside his brothers and their parents Maree and Bryce, were named AFL celebrity ambassadors for Seeing Eye Dogs Australia. In January 2010, Selwood became an ambassador for the Meningitis Centre. He had previously contracted HIB meningitis at two years old.
