= Scott Selwood =

Australian rules footballer

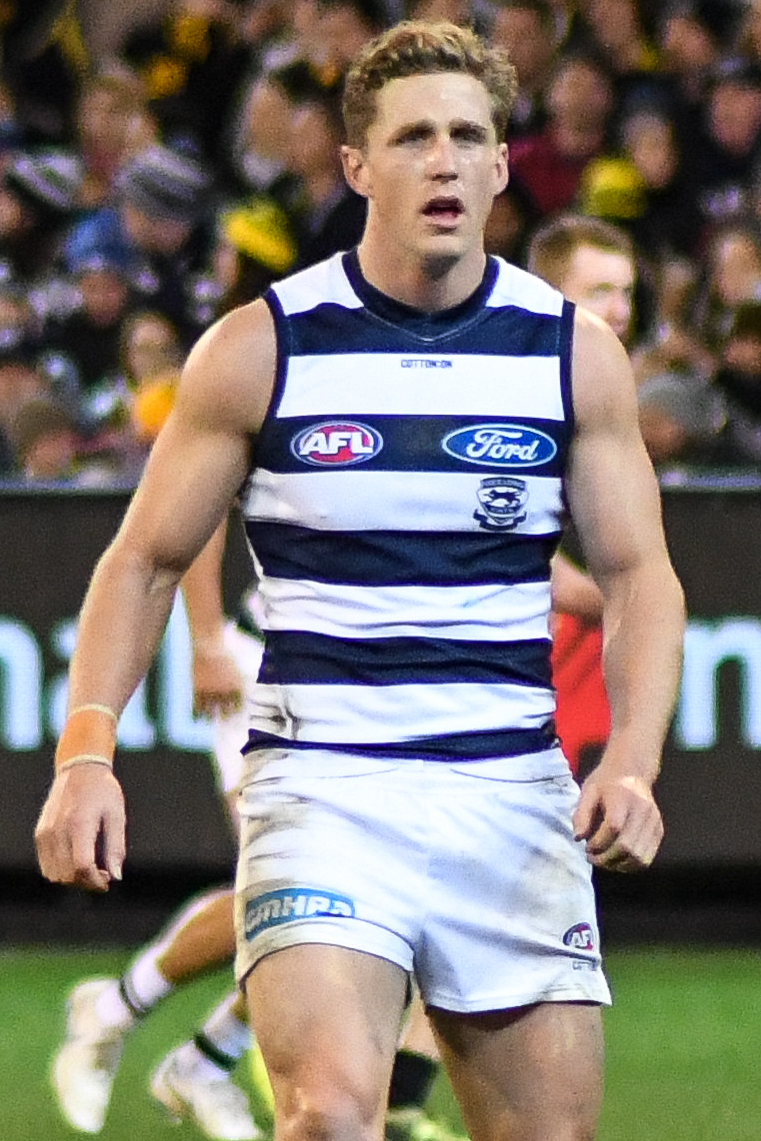
- Selwood playing for Geelong in 2018

Personal information
- Full name: Scott Francis Selwood
- Nickname: Scooter
- Born: 27 March 1990 (age 36); Bendigo, Victoria
- Original team: Bendigo Pioneers (TAC Cup)
- Draft: No. 22, 2007 national draft
- Debut: Round 3, 2008, West Coast vs. Fremantle, at Subiaco Oval
- Height: 186 cm (6 ft 1 in)
- Weight: 88 kg (194 lb)
- Position: Midfielder

Club information
- Current club: Ivanhoe Football Club

Playing career
Years	Club	Games (Goals)
2008–2015	West Coast	135 (37)
2016–2019	Geelong	34 (7)
Total		169 (44)

Career highlights
- John Worsfold Medal: 2012

Scott Francis Selwood (born 27 March 1990) is an Australian rules footballer who currently plays for the Ivanhoe Football Club in the Northern Football Netball League (NFNL). He previously played professionally for the West Coast Eagles and Geelong Football Club in the Australian Football League (AFL).

As an Eagle, Selwood won a John Worsfold Medal in 2012, and was one of five acting captains at the club in the second half of the 2014 season after then-captain Darren Glass retired midway through the season. He moved to Geelong via free agency at the end of the 2015 season, playing alongside his brother and former Geelong captain Joel Selwood for a further four seasons.

== Early life ==
Selwood grew up in Bendigo, Victoria, where he attended Catholic College Bendigo (now Catherine McAuley College). Selwood was recruited from the Bendigo Pioneers in the TAC Cup with West Coast's fourth pick (number 22 overall) in the 2007 AFL draft.

== AFL career ==
=== West Coast (2008–2015) ===
Selwood made his debut against Fremantle in the round 3 Western Derby in 2008. He played the following week against Sydney, but was dropped after a poor performance, obtaining only nine possessions. Selwood became a regular in the Eagles' line-up over the following three seasons, initially as a tagger, and later as an inside midfielder. He continued his outstanding form throughout the 2012 season, playing predominantly as a tagger and midfielder depending on the opposition. He capped off a stellar season by winning the John Worsfold Medal, ahead of teammates Dean Cox and Shannon Hurn.

When then-skipper Darren Glass announced his retirement immediately after round 12 of the 2014 season, Selwood, who had already shared acting captain duties with fellow vice-captain Josh Kennedy in the games that Glass had missed that season, was announced as one of several candidates who would rotate the captaincy for the remainder of the season.

=== Geelong (2016–2019) ===
On 12 October 2015, Selwood left West Coast and joined his brother Joel at Geelong as a restricted free agent. Selwood missed most of the 2016 season with an ankle injury, but managed to return for the final five games of the season. Selwood managed to play 27 games over the following two seasons, displaying glimpses of the form that made him one of the best taggers in the competition and leading the competition in average tackles (10.7) in 2017.

At the end of the 2019 season, after managing only two appearances due to hamstring injuries, Selwood was delisted by Geelong.

== Coaching career ==
Following his delisting from Geelong in 2019, Selwood joined Collingwood as a development coach.

== Personal life ==
Selwood had three older brothers who have also played AFL football: twins Adam (1984–2025), who also played for West Coast, Troy (1984–2025), who played for the Brisbane Lions, and Joel, who was captain of Geelong, retiring after the end of the 2022 AFL Season. In June 2007, the Selwood brothers and their parents were named AFL celebrity ambassadors for Seeing Eye Dogs Australia.

== Statistics ==
Legend
G	Goals	K	Kicks	D	Disposals	T	Tackles
B	Behinds	H	Handballs	M	Marks
†	Led the league for the season

Season	Team	No.	Games	Totals							Averages (per game)							Votes
Season	Team	No.	Games	G	B	K	H	D	M	T	G	B	K	H	D	M	T	Votes
2008	West Coast	28	9	2	0	51	57	108	30	14	0.2	0.0	5.7	6.3	12.0	3.3	1.6	0
2009	West Coast	10	14	2	1	97	110	207	46	39	0.1	0.1	6.9	7.9	14.8	3.3	2.8	0
2010	West Coast	10	20	4	1	153	171	324	70	99	0.2	0.1	7.7	8.6	16.2	3.5	5.0	0
2011	West Coast	10	25	9	10	220	248	468	69	202^{†}	0.4	0.4	8.8	9.9	18.7	2.8	8.1^{†}	0
2012	West Coast	10	24	11	7	265	332	597	114	117	0.5	0.3	11.0	13.8	24.9	4.8	4.9	15
2013	West Coast	10	18	4	6	228	232	460	82	136	0.2	0.3	12.7	12.9	25.6	4.6	7.6^{†}	5
2014	West Coast	10	12	3	4	120	131	251	40	60	0.3	0.3	10.0	10.9	20.9	3.3	5.0	0
2015	West Coast	10	13	2	6	96	95	191	27	53	0.2	0.5	7.4	7.3	14.7	2.1	4.1	0
2016	Geelong	16	5	0	1	45	56	101	19	23	0.0	0.2	9.0	11.2	20.2	3.8	4.6	0
2017	Geelong	16	14	3	3	107	164	271	45	150	0.2	0.2	7.6	11.7	19.4	3.2	10.7^{†}	1
2018	Geelong	16	13	3	1	80	135	215	40	69	0.2	0.1	6.2	10.4	16.5	3.1	5.3	0
2019	Geelong	16	2	1	1	21	17	38	8	12	0.5	0.5	10.5	8.5	19.0	4.0	6.0	0
Career			169	44	41	1483	1748	3231	590	974	0.3	0.2	8.8	10.3	19.1	3.5	5.8	21

== Honours and achievements ==
Individual

- John Worsfold Medal: 2012
