= Troy Selwood =

Australian rules footballer (1984–2025)

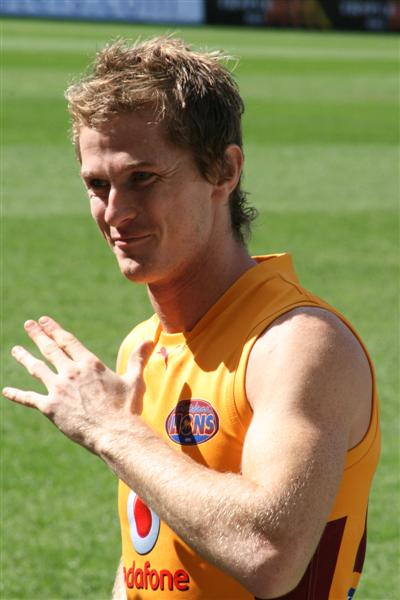
- Selwood training with the Brisbane Lions in 2008

Personal information
- Full name: Troy William Selwood
- Born: 1 May 1984; Bendigo, Victoria, Australia
- Died: 4 February 2025 (aged 40); Highton, Victoria, Australia
- Original teams: Sandhurst, Bendigo Pioneers
- Draft: 19th overall, 2002 AFL draft
- Height: 187 cm (6 ft 2 in)
- Weight: 88 kg (194 lb)
- Position: Midfielder

Playing career
Years	Club	Games (Goals)
2003–2010	Brisbane Lions	75 (11)

Career highlights
- VFL premiership player: 2012

Troy William Selwood (1 May 1984 – 4 February 2025) was an Australian rules footballer who played 75 games for the Brisbane Lions in the Australian Football League (AFL). He was also captain of the Geelong Football Club's team in the Victorian Football League (VFL) from 2011 to 2013.

== Early life ==
Selwood was born in Bendigo, Victoria.

== AFL career ==
Selwood was drafted by the Brisbane Lions with the number 19 pick in the 2002 AFL draft from Sandhurst. After not playing in 2003 or 2004, he made his AFL debut for the Lions wearing the number 28 guernsey in Round 1, 2005, against St Kilda. His endurance and accountable style of play saw him mainly utilised in a tagging role on key opposition players.

On 9 May 2009, Selwood was knocked unconscious in a collision with Richmond's Alex Rance.

Selwood was delisted by the Brisbane Lions at the end of the 2010 season.

== VFL career ==
On 1 October 2010, Selwood was rumoured to be moving back to his home state of Victoria and to the Geelong Football Club in the hope of resurrecting his AFL career. It was suggested that Selwood would juggle completing his commerce degree while also working for Geelong and playing for the Cats in the VFL. He hoped to play AFL in season 2012. He was appointed co-captain of the Geelong VFL side at the beginning of the 2011 season.

On 23 September 2012, Selwood led the Geelong Cats' VFL side to a premiership, defeating Port Melbourne by 33 points at Docklands Stadium in Melbourne. He retired from VFL football at the end of the 2013 season.

== Personal life and death ==
A member of the Selwood family from Bendigo in central Victoria, Selwood had three brothers: twin brother Adam (who played for West Coast), and younger brothers Joel and Scott (who both played for Geelong).

Selwood had two children. He died by suicide at a property in Highton, Geelong, on 4 February 2025, at the age of 40. A memorial service was held at Kardinia Park in South Geelong.

Three months later, Selwood's twin brother, Adam, also died by suicide.

AFL players from around the country paid their respects on social media in memory of both Troy and Adam.
