= Kardinia Park (stadium) =

Sporting venue in Victoria, Australia

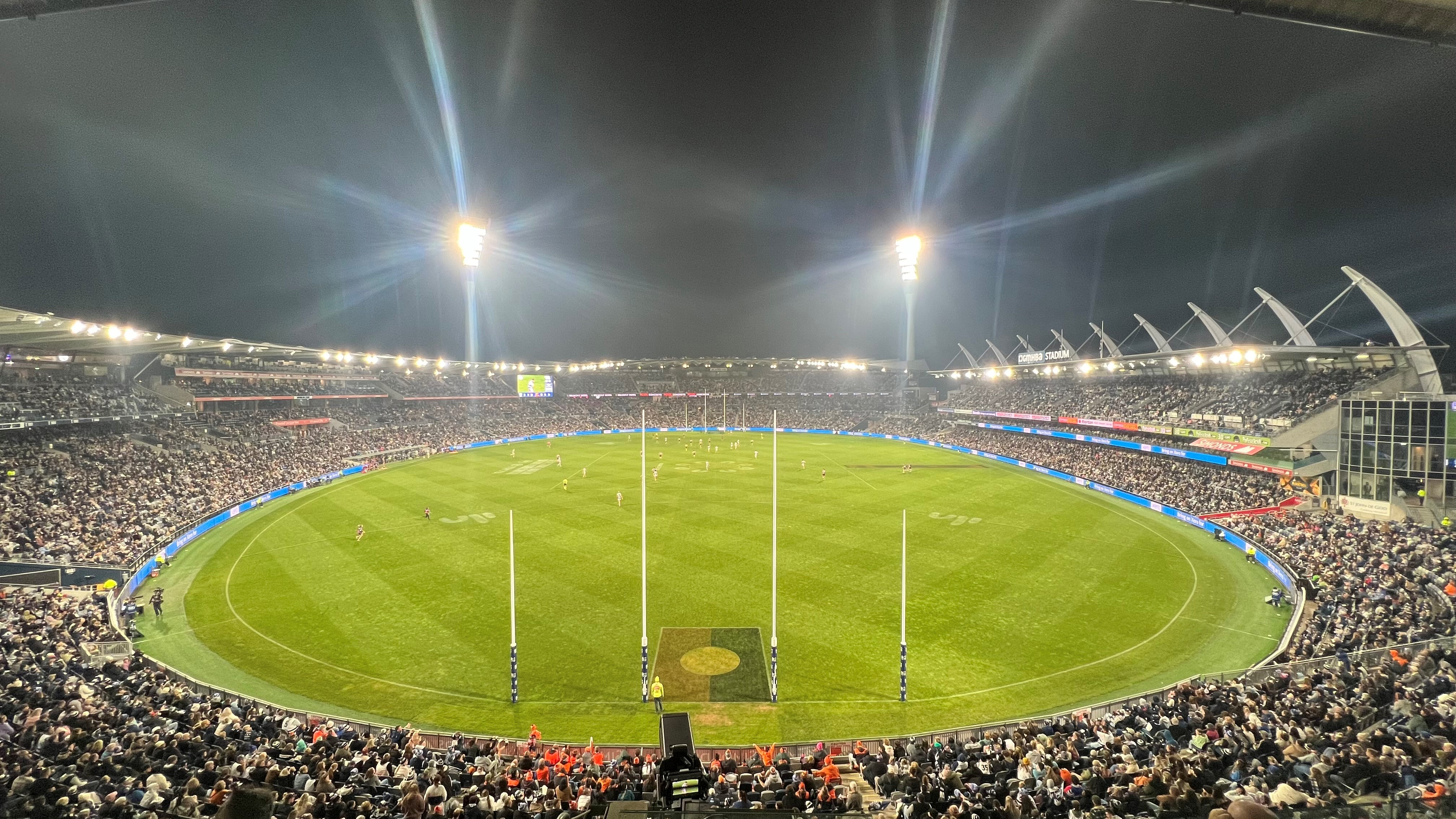
- View from the Players Stand in May 2024
- Interactive map of Kardinia Park
- Former names: Skilled Stadium; Shell Stadium; Baytec Stadium; Simonds Stadium
- Address: 370 Moorabool St; South Geelong, Victoria,
- Coordinates: 38°9′29″S 144°21′17″E
- Owner: Kardinia Park Stadium Trust
- Operator: Kardinia Park Stadium Trust/Geelong Football Club
- Capacity: 40,000
- Surface: Grass
- Record attendance: 49,109 (30 August 1952 Geelong v Carlton)
- Field size: 170 metres × 115 metres

Construction
- Built: 1941; 85 years ago
- Cost: A$319 million redevelopment (2003–2024) (Note: The following figures do not take into account inflation: Stage 1 – $28 million (2003–05); Stage 2 – $25 million (2007–10); Stage 3 – $33 million (2011–13); Stage 4 – $91 million (2015–17); Stage 5 – $142 million (2021–24) Refer to Redevelopments for details and references for these figures.)
- Architects: Populous (company), Peddle Thorp (Redevelopment)

Tenants
- Australian rules football Geelong Football Club; VFL/AFL (1941–present); VFL (2000–present); AFLW (2019–present) Cricket Melbourne Renegades (BBL) (2018–2026); Australia national cricket team (2017) Association football Melbourne Victory (A-League) (2013–2019); Western United (A-League) (2019–2021) Rugby union Melbourne Rising (NRC) (2015, 2018) Rugby League Melbourne Storm (NRL) (Trials 2013, 2019, 2023)

Ground information
- First men's T20I: 19 February 2017: Australia v Sri Lanka
- Last men's T20I: 20 October 2022: Namibia v United Arab Emirates
- Only women's T20I: 19 February 2017: Australia v New Zealand
- As of 20 October 2022; Source: Cricinfo

Kardinia Park (known under naming rights as GMHBA Stadium, and commonly nicknamed the Cattery) is a stadium located within Kardinia Park in the Victorian suburb of South Geelong. It is primarily used for Australian rules football as the home ground of the Geelong Football Club, in the Australian Football League (AFL) and the AFL Women's (AFLW).

The stadium was built in 1941 and is owned and operated by the Kardinia Park Stadium Trust. With a capacity of 40,000 spectators it is the largest stadium by capacity in regional Australia and the third-largest in Victoria (behind the Melbourne Cricket Ground and Docklands Stadium). Locally based private health insurer GMHBA have held naming rights sponsorship to the stadium since 2017.

In addition to Geelong in the AFL, the venue has regularly hosted the Geelong Football Netball League (GFNL) grand final. It has also been used for cricket as a secondary home ground for the Melbourne Renegades in the Big Bash League (BBL).

== Australian rules football ==
=== Early years ===
Football has been played on Kardinia Park since the 19th century, and prior to the 1940s, Kardinia Park was the secondary football venue in the city of Geelong; Corio Oval was the primary venue, and the Geelong Football Club played its Victorian Football League games at that venue until 1940. Kardinia Park served as the home ground for the Geelong (A.) Football Club in the Victorian Football Association from 1922 until 1925, before that club moved to the Western Oval in Geelong West; local and district football was played regularly on the ground.

The Geelong Football Club began playing its home games at Kardinia Park in 1941 after Corio Oval was commandeered by the military during World War II, and it became its permanent home venue thereafter.

=== Recent history ===
On 23 May 2002, Kardinia Park hosted a visit from the Dalai Lama, who again visited the stadium in June 2007.

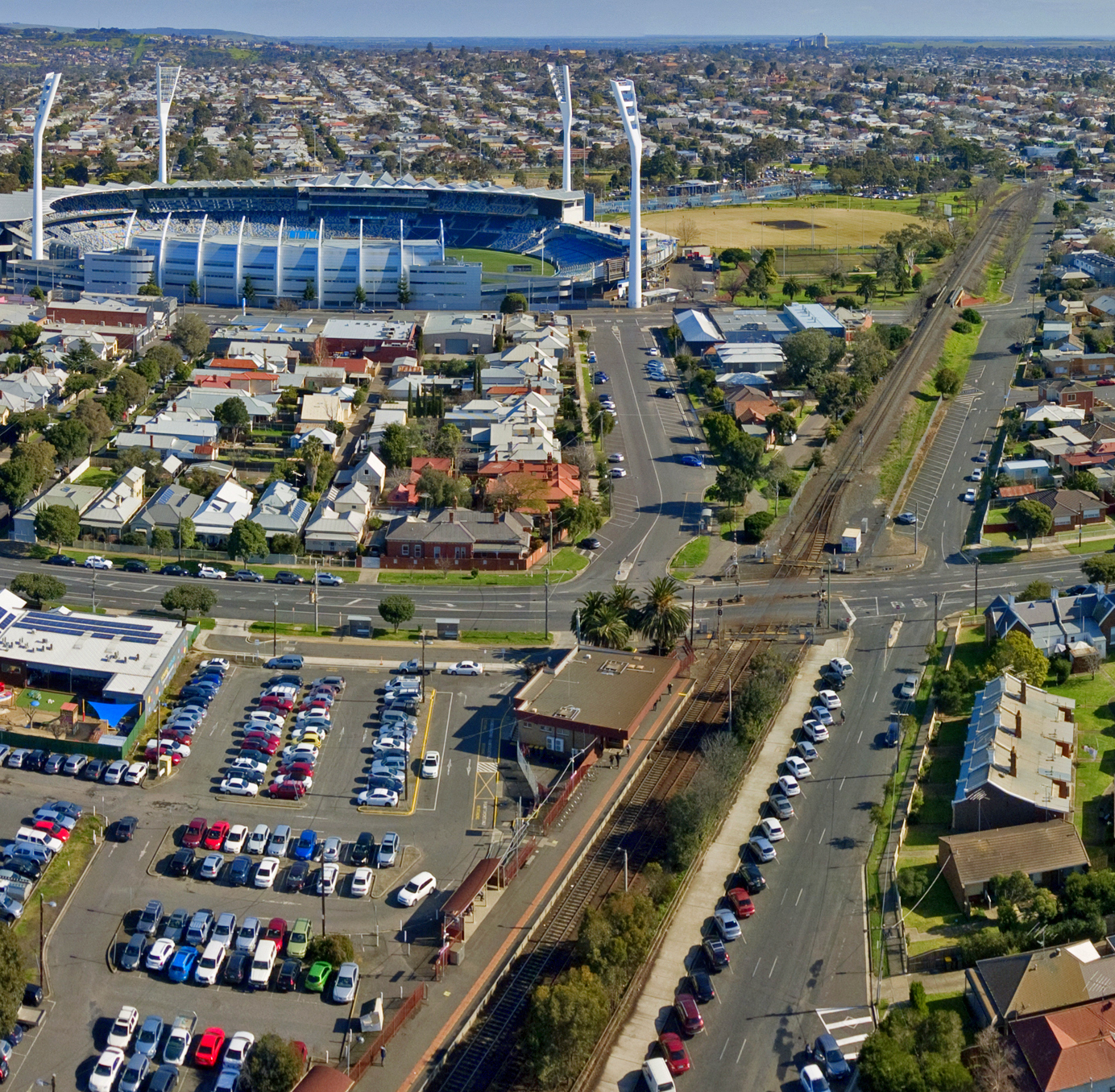
Aerial perspective of Kardinia Park Stadium with South Geelong train station

Kardinia Park is regarded as a proverbial graveyard for teams playing against Geelong, which has an especially good record at the ground. Geelong did not lose a single match played at the venue between 26 August 2007 and 27 August 2011. Geelong's Jimmy Bartel credited the home-field advantage to the fact that Geelong is one of the few clubs which still practises on the same field that it plays on.

On 22 June 2011, it was announced the stadium would have a new name in 2012. After 10 years as naming rights sponsor of Skilled Stadium, Skilled Group decided to relinquish these rights as of 31 October 2011. Previous names of the stadium as results of sponsorship deals have been Skilled Stadium, Shell Stadium and Baytec Stadium; however it was only called Baytec Stadium for less than two months, and only one pre-season match was played there under the name. The stadium is nicknamed "The Cattery" by the club's supporters.

On 30 July 2011, Geelong recorded its largest ever victory, and the second-largest victory in V/AFL history when it defeated Melbourne by 186 points. The Cats' score of 37.11 (233) was their second-highest score in club history, and the highest ever score recorded at Kardinia Park.

Floodlights were installed prior to the 2013 AFL season, and the venue staged its first night match during the season.

On 7 September 2013, Kardinia Park hosted its first ever AFL Final, a qualifying final against Fremantle Dockers, with Geelong losing the game 87–72.

In its current layout Kardinia Park consists of the following seating areas: the Reg Hickey Stand, Players Stand, Premiership Stand, Brownlow Stand and the new Joel Selwood Stand, with the Gary Ablett Terrace standing room section located within the Selwood stand.

On 4 July 2021, the venue hosted its 689th V/AFL match, but its first ever AFL home and away fixture not involving Geelong, as Sydney Swans hosted West Coast Eagles due to the COVID-19 pandemic in New South Wales causing a lockdown in the Greater Sydney area. Sydney won 118–26 with the attendance posted of 9,520.

== Cricket ==
In 2016, it was announced that international cricket would be played at the ground for the first time. The ground hosted second T20 International between Australia and Sri Lanka on 19 February. The ground witnessed memorable match between two nations, where Sri Lanka won the match by 2 wickets at the end. Sri Lanka chased 173 runs at the last ball of the match.

On 3 January 2018 the ground hosted a Women's Big Bash League and Big Bash League double header with the Melbourne Renegades taking on the Sydney Sixers with the Renegades winning in both matches. The Renegades typically host up to two home games per season at the stadium, often at the start of their season.

The ground was to be used in the 2020 ICC T20 World Cup. However, due to the impact of the COVID-19 pandemic, the tournament was postponed to October 2021 with United Arab Emirates and Oman hosting instead of Australia who hosted the 2022 ICC T20 World Cup instead.

== Football ==
In August 2019, it was announced that new A-League club Western United would play the majority of home matches at Kardinia Park for the upcoming 2019/20 season and for a further two or three years. The club had planned to play most home matches at Kardinia Park until moving into their proposed new stadium in Tarneit in Melbourne's West. Their first game at the ground was a 1–1 draw with Perth Glory in front of 6,088 on 19 October 2019. Western United last played matches at Kardinia Park in December 2021.

Kardinia Park was included in the Australia 2022 FIFA World Cup bid, with a proposed upgrade to 44,000 seats analogous to the later proposed stage 5 of redevelopment, with the new multi tiered stand stretching all the way from the southern end, around the western side and the northern Ablett stand, however the bid lost out to Qatar.

After a seven-year gap between Melbourne Victory's first match at the stadium, a 2007 A-League Pre-Season Challenge Cup match against Newcastle Jets and their second, a 2014 AFC Champions League qualifying play-off against Thai side Muangthong United, the ground hosted its first-ever A-League premiership match in 2015 when Victory played Perth Glory FC in round 14 of the 2014–15 A-League season with an attendance of 21,289 as the first match of a three-year deal to bring one Victory fixture per season to Geelong. The second match drew 14,268 fans to an exciting six-goal, come-from-behind draw by the Victory against Central Coast Mariners in January 2016, while the third was held on 2 January 2017 with Newcastle Jets as the visiting team, when a crowd of 14,081 witnessed Besart Berisha overtake Archie Thompson's all-time A-League scoring record in a 4–2 win for the Victory. Victory and the stadium trust agreed to extend the deal by two more years in 2017.

European Champions League finalists Atlético Madrid played Melbourne Victory in a friendly match at the stadium on 31 July 2016. Melbourne Victory won 1–0.

The stadium has also played host to one full men's international match on 30 December 2014, a pre-tournament friendly between Bahrain and Saudi Arabia prior to the 2015 AFC Asian Cup hosted by Australia, which ended as a 4–1 win for Bahrain.

The Australian women's national team, the Matildas, won a friendly match against China 5–1 on 26 November 2017, attracting a crowd of 6,338 even with a thunderstorm which forced a delay to the match of half an hour.

== Other uses ==
During the late 1920s and early 1930s when Motorcycle speedway was becoming popular throughout Australia, Kardinia Park was home to a dirt track speedway known as the Geelong Velodrome. The Velodrome hosted the inaugural Victorian Solo Speedway Championship in 1926/27 and followed up with the second championship held in 1927/28. Both championships were won by Billy Pilgrim.

On 4 March 2022, American band Foo Fighters performed at the venue marking the first stadium show in the country after the COVID-19 pandemic in Australia.

== Redevelopments ==
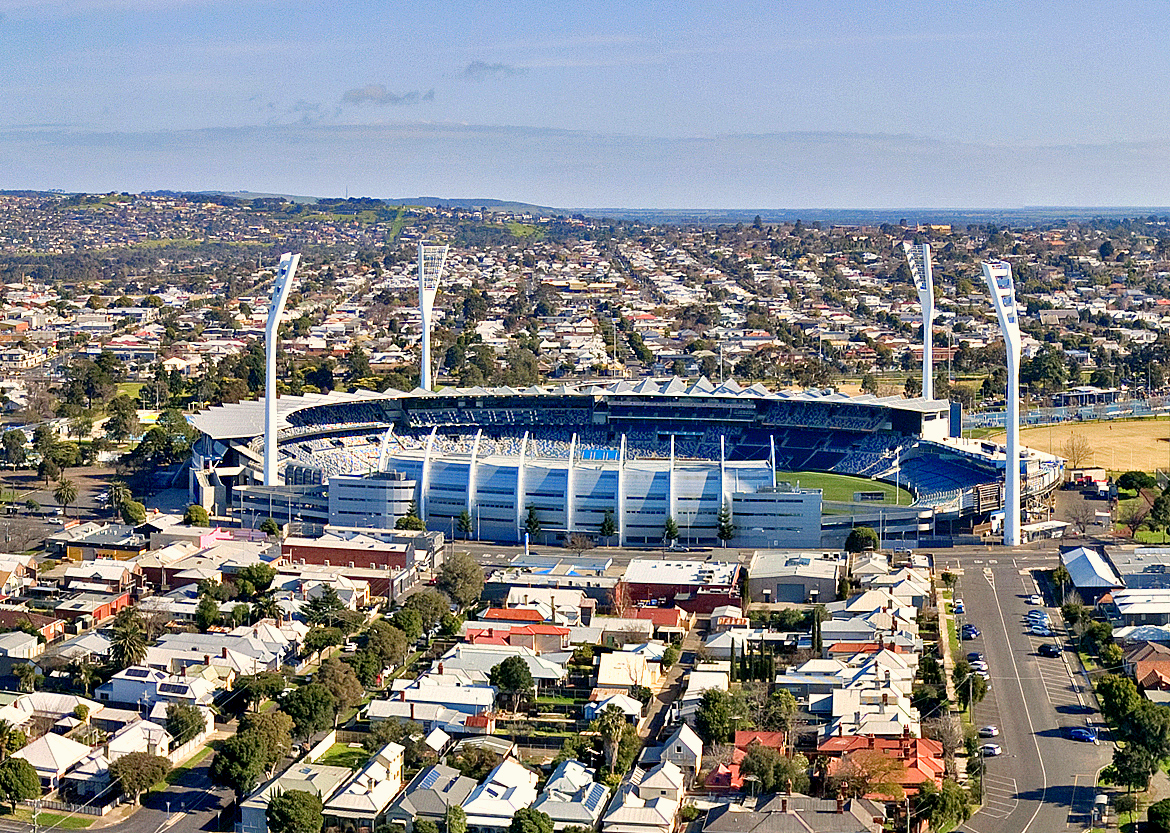
Aerial perspective of Kardinia Park stadium, August 2018

Over a twenty-year period between 2003 and 2023, Kardinia Park underwent an extensive redevelopment of its grandstands, spectator facilities and interior features. The first stage of the redevelopment came in the form A$28 million redevelopment of the stadium, announced in 2003. $13.5 million in funding originated from the Victorian Government, $4.5 million from the Geelong Football Club, and $2 million from the AFL. The redeveloped ground was opened on 1 May 2005 during the first home game of the 2005 season. It included a new western entry and membership area, as well as the five-level wing-side grandstand with a capacity of 6,098 spectators on the eastern side of the stadium.

A favourite for the honour of the naming of the new stand was Bob Davis, coach of the Cats' premiership side in 1963. On 15 June 2005, City of Greater Geelong councillors granted the club its wish to change the name of the new eastern stand to the Reg Hickey Stand, while the southern stand became the Doug Wade Stand. The northern terrace became known as the Gary Ablett Terrace while the western gate was renamed the Bob Davis Gate.

In September 2007, Kardinia Park received a further total of $25 million towards the second stage of redevelopment in demolishing the Ross Drew Stand on the south western side of the ground. Funding for the project included $14 million from the federal government and $6 million from the Victorian government. The new stand, known as the Premiership Stand, features seating for 4,714 supporters, including up to 800 corporate guests on match days. The stand opened on 10 April 2010 and was officially unveiled in round four of the 2010 AFL season, coinciding with the unveiling of the 2009 premiership flag. A$50,000 was also spent on a new 600-seat temporary stand between the Reg Hickey and Doug Wade stands.

In May 2009 it was revealed that the stadium owners the City of Greater Geelong had approached a number of Melbourne-based AFL clubs discussing the financial advantages of playing home games at the ground. Though such a move never eventuated, the ground was capable of earning other clubs A$30 a patron, compared to the A$7 a patron earned at Docklands Stadium in Melbourne. The Geelong Football Club had first floated using Kardinia Park as a potential home game venue for Melbourne clubs in 2006.

In April 2011, plans for the third stage of redevelopment were revealed. In this redevelopment, the Doug Wade stand at the southern end of the stadium was pulled down at the end of the 2011 AFL season. In place of the demolished Wade stand was a new 9,340 seat southern grandstand. The new grandstand included improved spectator amenities, a purpose-built training facility for community sports and education groups, a function room, and four broadcast-compliant floodlit towers, allowing the stadium to host night-time events. The redevelopment saw the stadium increase in capacity to 33,500. The redevelopment cost $33 million, of which $11.7 million was spent on the new lighting.

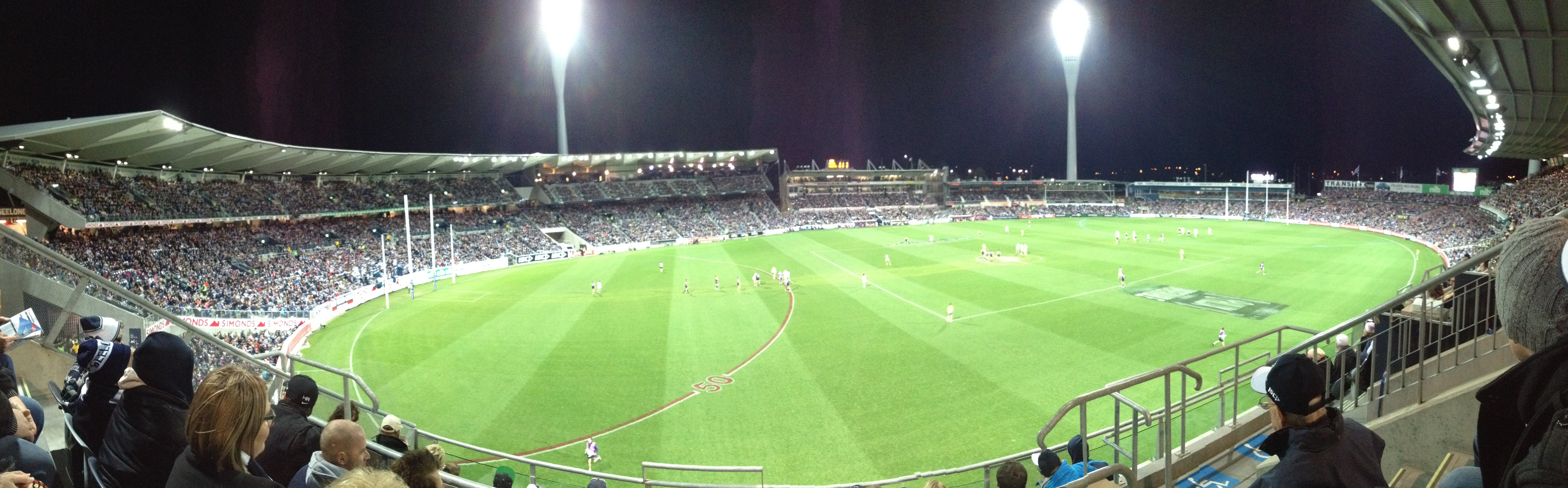
AFL night match at Simonds Stadium, 2014

Significant miscalculations were made with respect to the budget required for the stage 3 redevelopment and consequently several aspects of the original plans were scaled back by the Geelong Football Club, including the removal of the proposed supporters lounge and a decrease in capacity by 1,000 seats. The new grandstand was named the Players Stand in August 2012. Around this time the ground received a new name, Simonds Stadium, after homebuilding group Simonds Homes signed a five-year naming rights deal.

The new Players Stand was officially opened on 1 June 2013, prior to Geelong's first proper home match of the 2013 AFL season against Gold Coast. The match was the first to be played under the new floodlights and was played in front of 30,082 fans, the largest crowd at the stadium at that time since the first stage of the redevelopment.

The fourth stage of redevelopment saw the Brownlow and the Jennings Stands demolished at the end of the 2015 AFL season to make way for a new single grandstand. The new stand, eventually named the Brownlow Stand (in honour of the club's Brownlow Medal winners and administrator Charles Brownlow) was opened on 18 May 2017. The new stand features seating for 6,500 people, improved media facilities, a new 1,000-seat function centre, a merchandise store, café, improved football department facilities and the "Sunrise Centre", a community facility providing rehabilitation for people returning to the workforce following serious injury.

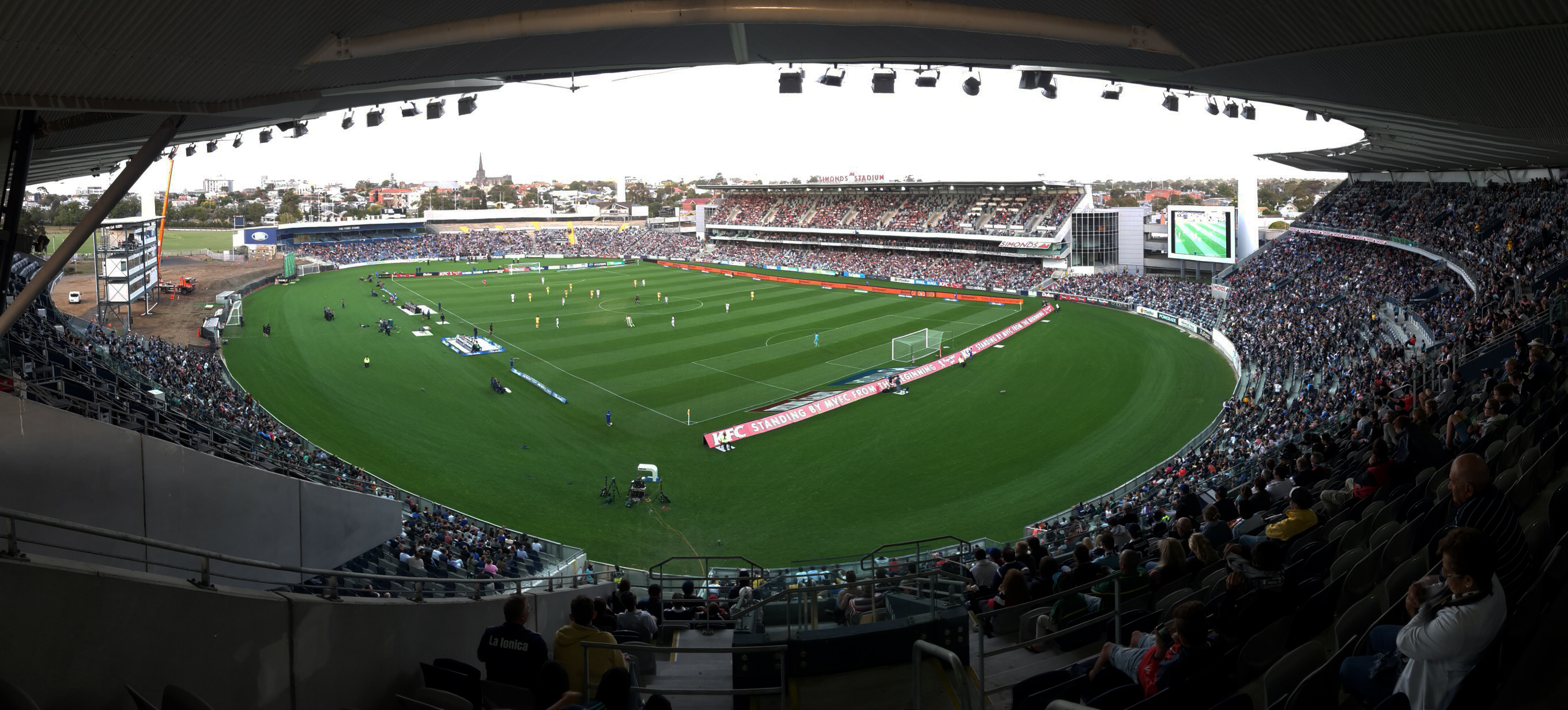
A-League match between Melbourne Victory and Central Coast Mariners during the fourth stage of redovelopment, January 2016

The total cost of the fourth stage of redevelopment was $91 million, of which $75m came from the Victorian Government, $6m from the City of Greater Geelong, $6 million from the Geelong Football Club and $4 million from the Australian Football League (AFL). The total capacity of Kardinia Park after the stage 4 redevelopment was nominally 36,000; however, given the way the stadium was configured for AFL matches, the capacity was said to be unable to exceed 34,000.

During 2016 the Victorian Parliament approved a law to transfer management of the stadium to the government-appointed Kardinia Park Stadium Trust, in line with practices at other major venues in the state. Prior to this the venue had been owned and operated by the City of Greater Geelong. Since the transfer, the city maintains and manages the Kardinia Park precinct, though no longer has any operational control over the stadium.

In April 2017, the Victorian Government announced an investment of $3.9 million in the upcoming state budget to fund the planning and design stage for Stage 5 of the redevelopment. This stage of redevelopment was the final part of the more two-decade-long process to increase the capacity of Kardinia Park to 40,000 and resulted in the Ford Stand and Gary Ablett Terrace being removed to make way for a new grandstand to ring around the northern section of the stadium. In November 2020 the government revealed it had assigned $142 million to complete this final stage of redevelopment. The new grandstand holds 14,000 spectators and includes function rooms, administrative offices and broadcast studios, cricket warm-up facilities and standing room facilities for spectators. Construction commenced in September 2021 following the conclusion of the AFL season. Due to the commencement of construction associated with Stage 5 of the stadium's redevelopment, the stadium's capacity was temporarily reduced to as low as 23,000 at times.

Despite being originally planned to be completed by mid-2023, the fifth stage of redevelopment was delayed to early 2024 due to defects with overseas-sourced steel. In November 2023, as the stand was nearing completion, the stadium trust announced that the stand would be named the Joel Selwood Stand, in recognition of former Geelong Football Club premiership captain Joel Selwood, who played 355 games with the club. The stand was completed shortly thereafter and was first used by spectators at a pre-season match between Geelong and Essendon on 1 March 2024. It was formally unveiled by the government and other parties at a press conference on 12 March 2024, a few days prior to the round 1 match between Geelong and St Kilda.

The five stage redevelopment of the stadium, completed over two decades at a cost of $340 million, has given rise to the ground being given the nickname Pork Barrel Park, a reference to the practice of politicians spending money on local projects to win favour with voters. Although the stadium is in the safe federal Labor seat of Division of Corio, the neighbouring Division of Corangamite has been a marginal seat for close to two decades, leading to claims that the Australian Labor Party and the Liberal Party of Australia have both sought to win support from voters by continually upgrading the stadium.

Since January 2018, the stadium has been commercially named GMHBA Stadium.

== Hosted events ==
- Australian Football League
- Victorian Football League
- Geelong Football League finals series
- Victorian Premier Cricket for the Geelong Cricket Club
- KFC Twenty20 Big Bash
- A-League
- A-League Pre-Season Challenge Cup
- W-League (Australia)
- AFC Champions League
- Big Bash League
- National Rugby Championship
- National Rugby League
- 2022 ICC Men's T20 World Cup

== Attendance records ==
Top 10 sports attendances
No.	Date	Teams	Sport	Competition	Crowd
1	30 August 1952	Geelong vs Carlton	Australian rules football	VFL	49,107
2	16 August 1980	Geelong vs Collingwood	Australian rules football	VFL	42,278
3	20 April 1981	Geelong vs Collingwood	Australian rules football	VFL	41,395
4	3 August 1963	Geelong vs Essendon	Australian rules football	VFL	40,885
5	25 April 1964	Geelong vs Collingwood	Australian rules football	VFL	40,299
6	16 March 2024	Geelong vs St Kilda	Australian rules football	AFL	39,352
7	28 March 1981	Geelong vs Essendon	Australian rules football	VFL	37,256
8	12 July 1952	Geelong vs Collingwood	Australian rules football	VFL	36,145
9	25 April 1970	Geelong vs Collingwood	Australian rules football	VFL	35,654
10	20 June 2025	Geelong vs Brisbane Lions	Australian rules football	AFL	35,367

Last updated 21 June 2025

Top 10 attendances since 2004 – redevelopments
No.	Date	Teams	Sport	Competition	Round	Crowd
1	16 March 2024	Geelong vs St Kilda	Australian rules football	AFL	Round 1	39,352
2	20 June 2025	Geelong vs Brisbane Lions	Australian rules football	AFL	Round 15	35,367
3	6 July 2024	Geelong vs Hawthorn	Australian rules football	AFL	Round 18	33,188
4	7 September 2013	Geelong vs Fremantle	Australian rules football	AFL	Qualifying Final	32,815
5	24 August 2024	Geelong vs West Coast	Australian rules football	AFL	Round 24	32,545
6	12 August 2017	Geelong vs Richmond	Australian rules football	AFL	Round 21	32,266
7	24 August 2019	Geelong vs Carlton	Australian rules football	AFL	Round 23	31,669
8	18 May 2019	Geelong vs Western Bulldogs	Australian rules football	AFL	Round 9	31,373
9	9 June 2018	Geelong vs North Melbourne	Australian rules football	AFL	Round 12	31,265
10	14 April 2024	Geelong vs North Melbourne	Australian rules football	AFL	Round 5	31,194

Last updated 21 June 2025

Highest crowd by sport
Sport	Crowd	Date	Home team	Away team
Australian Rules Football	49,109	30 August 1952	Geelong	Carlton
Association Football (International)	30,097	7 December 2024	Matildas	Chinese Taipei
Cricket (Domestic T20)	23,586	3 January 2018	Melbourne Renegades	Sydney Sixers
Association Football	21,289	2 January 2015	Melbourne Victory	Perth Glory
Cricket (International T20)	16,407	16 October 2022	Sri Lanka	Namibia
Cricket (International T20)	16,407	16 October 2022	United Arab Emirates	Netherlands
Rugby Union	8,000	3 February 2012	Melbourne Rebels	Waikato Chiefs
Rugby League	7,857	12 February 2023	Melbourne Storm	Sydney Roosters

- Sources

== VFL/AFL records ==
Players

- Most games played: Ian Nankervis (Geelong), 138
- Most goals kicked: Doug Wade (Geelong/North Melbourne), 413
- Most goals kicked in a match: Doug Wade (Geelong), 13.2 (80) vs. North Melbourne, 14 August 1971
- Most disposals in a match: Tony Shaw (Collingwood), 48 vs. Geelong, 12 May 1984

Teams

- Highest score: Geelong 37.11 (233) defeated Melbourne 7.5 (47), 30 July 2011
- Lowest score: North Melbourne 1.8 (14) defeated by Geelong 9.15 (69), 10 August 2019
- Biggest margin: Geelong defeated Melbourne, 186 points, 30 July 2011
- Longest winning streak: Geelong, 29 games, 2008–2011

Last updated: 11 August 2019.

== Dimensions ==
- Length – 170m
- Width – 115m
- Goals run north to south

The field is the narrowest playing field used for AFL games; however, many other venues are much shorter (with Sydney Cricket Ground being the shortest).

== Naming rights sponsors ==
- 1999–2001: Shell
- 2002: Baytec
- 2002–11: Skilled
- 2012–17: Simonds
- 2018–present: GMHBA
