= GMHBA =

Australian health insurance and care company

GMHBA Limited
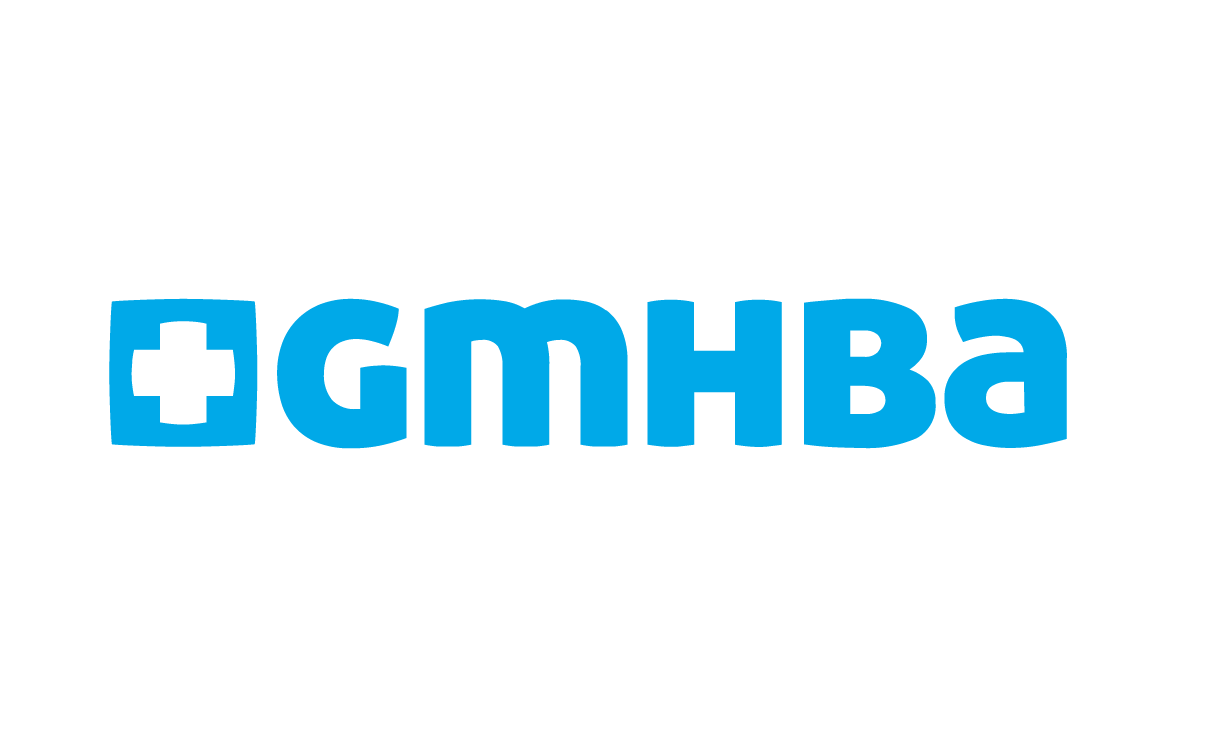
- Type: Non-profit organisation
- Industry: Private health insurance
- Founded: 1934
- Headquarters: Geelong, Australia
- Key people: David Greig (CEO) Claire Higgins (GMHBA Chair)
- Website: GMHBA Health Insurance

GMHBA Limited is a not-for-profit, mutual Australian private health insurance and care company founded in 1934, based in Geelong, Victoria, Australia. GMHBA also operates eye care and dental care practices along with GP clinics.

== History ==
GMHBA has roots in the Cement Workers Hospital Benefits Scheme, established in 1927 by workers at the cement works at Fyansford, on the outskirts of Geelong. By 1928 a number of similar schemes had been started for employees of other local industrial organisations. An open health fund was officially launched and opened to the public by the mayor of Geelong on 13 August 1934. The name Geelong Medical and Hospital Benefits Association (GMHBA) was adopted in 1958.

In October 2009 GMHBA launched a second brand called Frank Health Insurance, which was developed to provide a simple private health insurance offering at low cost.

== NIB takeover bid ==
In October 2010 Newcastle, New South Wales based health fund NIB made a $140 million takeover offer to GMHBA members. The company went public with the offer, after the GMHBA board rejected their initial offer and refused to enter into discussions. NIB was Australia's first health fund to demutualise, listing on the stock exchange in 2007. The takeover would give members an average of $1500 tax free, with some receiving as much as $6500.

NIB chief Mark Fitzgibbon admitted that his company's $4 million sponsorship of the Geelong Football Club and the Lorne Pier to Pub swimming race was part of a long-term strategy to win support of Geelong locals. He also said that he intended to recruit a number of local celebrities, including GFC president Frank Costa and sports broadcaster Billy Brownless, to pressure GMHBA directors into calling a vote. GMHBA chief Ken Jarvis criticised the actions of NIB, saying his company makes a $15 million a year contribution to the Geelong economy and supported local charities.

The initial $140 million offer was later increased to $161 million, and then to $180 million, before it was withdrawn by NIB in December 2010, after the GMHBA board still refused to consider the offer.
