= Seeing Eye Dogs Australia =

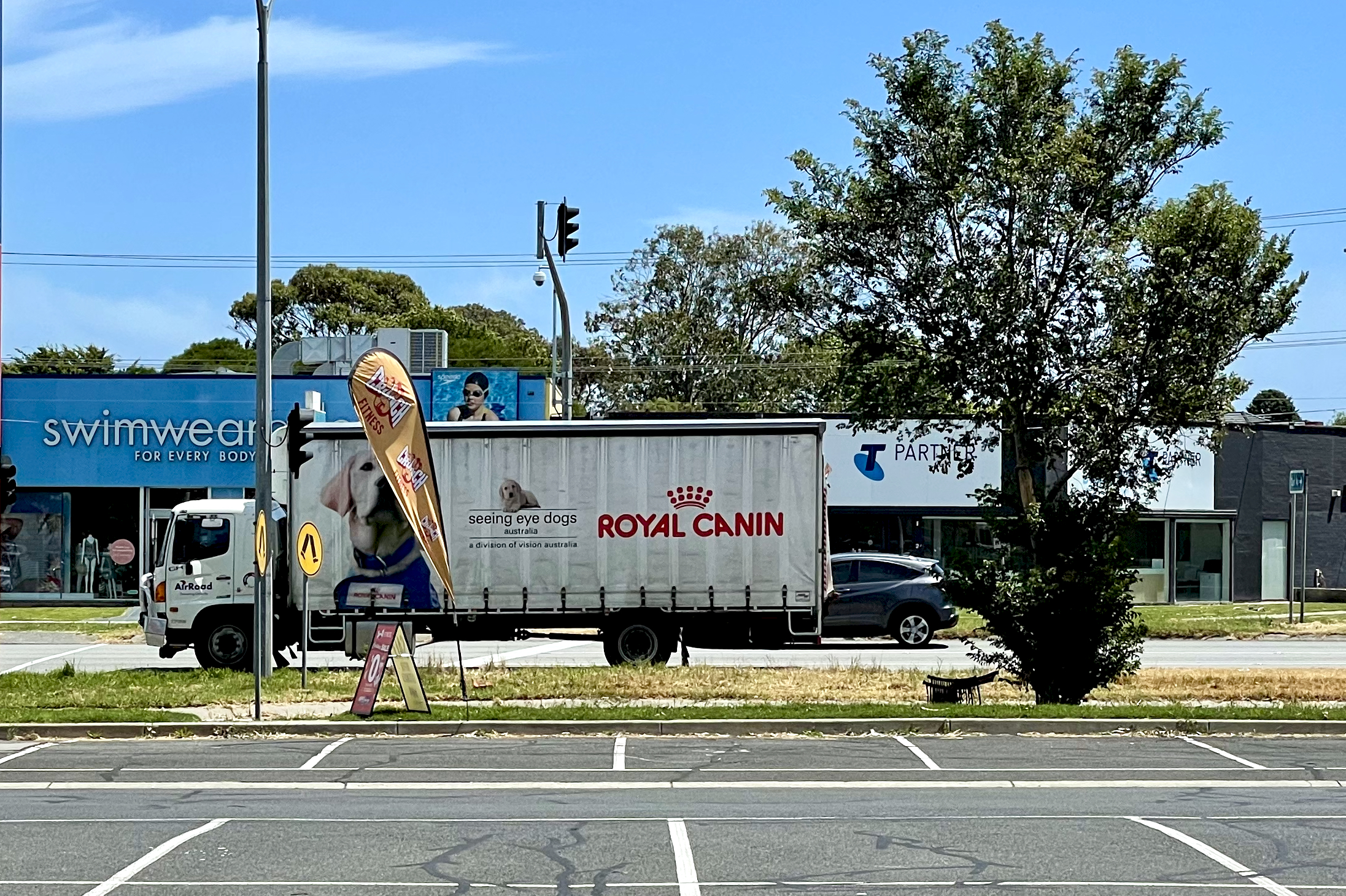
Royal Canin truck supporting Seeing Eye Dogs Australia.

Seeing Eye Dogs Australia (SEDA) is the only national organisation in Australia to focus on providing Seeing Eye Dogs to people with vision impairment.

SEDA's head office is based in Melbourne, Australia - though it has major operations in Queensland.
