= 2007 AFL draft =

Draft for the Australian Football League

General information
- Date: 24 November 2007
- Network: Fox Sports
- Sponsored by: National Australia Bank

Overview
- League: AFL
- First selection: Matthew Kreuzer (Carlton)

The 2007 Australian Football League draft consisted of four opportunities for player acquisitions during the 2007/08 Australian Football League off-season. These were trade week, the national draft, which was held on 24 November 2007, the pre-season draft and the rookie draft.

== Player movements ==
=== Trades ===
2007 was the first year that clubs were allowed to trade picks without the trade involving a player.

The trade week was headlined by the desire of West Coast premiership captain Chris Judd to return to Victoria, after six years with the club having been drafted to the Eagles in 2001. His departure created much attention and speculation among the Melbourne-based clubs, the media and the football community.

In the weeks following the announcement of his departure, Judd met with four clubs: Essendon, Melbourne, Collingwood and Carlton. On 2 October 2007, Judd announced that his preferred club was Carlton, and Carlton was also considered most likely to secure a trade with West Coast, because the club held two early draft picks which could be used in negotiations. On 11 October 2007, Judd was officially traded to Carlton along with a third round selection in the 2007 AFL draft (No. 46 overall) for Carlton's first and second round selections (No. 3 and 20) and Josh Kennedy, who was reluctant to leave Carlton.

Player	Original club	New club	Traded for
Martin Mattner	Adelaide	Sydney	draft pick #28
John Meesen	Adelaide	Melbourne	draft pick #37
Chris Judd and draft pick #46	West Coast	Carlton	Josh Kennedy, draft picks #3 and #20
Josh Kennedy, draft picks #3 and #20	Carlton	West Coast	Chris Judd and draft pick #46
Cameron Wood	Brisbane Lions	Collingwood	draft pick #14
Travis Johnstone	Melbourne	Brisbane Lions	draft pick #14
Brad Moran	Kangaroos	Adelaide	draft pick #37
Brad Symes	Port Adelaide	Adelaide	draft pick #28
Jordan McMahon	Western Bulldogs	Richmond	draft pick #19
Henry Playfair	Geelong	Sydney	draft pick #44
Adam Schneider	Sydney	St Kilda	draft pick #26
Sean Dempster	Sydney	St Kilda	draft pick #26
Mitch Morton	West Coast	Richmond	draft pick #35
Steven King	Geelong	St Kilda	draft pick #90
Charlie Gardiner	Geelong	St Kilda	draft pick #90
Ben Hudson and draft pick #43	Adelaide	Western Bulldogs	draft picks #30 & #38
Tim Callan and draft pick #66	Geelong	Western Bulldogs	draft pick #62
Ben Davies	Collingwood	Kangaroos	draft pick #96
Sam Power	Western Bulldogs	Kangaroos	draft pick #48
Richard Hadley	Brisbane Lions	Carlton	draft pick #52
Draft pick #22	Western Bulldogs	West Coast	draft picks #30 and #35

=== Retirements and delistings ===
The 2007 AFL season is notable for the unusually large number of players who retired, particularly senior and "champion" players.

Name	Club	Date Retired	Reason
Jonathan Hay	Kangaroos	22 February	Contractual problems resulting from bi-polar issues.
Darren Gaspar	Richmond	4 May	To help Richmond's younger players and go for a youth policy.
Brett Montgomery	Western Bulldogs	25 May	Disk bulge in neck.
Rhys Archard	Adelaide	29 July	Return to family in rural Victoria.
Luke Darcy	Western Bulldogs	30 July	Frustrated and angry at game due to knee injuries.
Anthony Koutoufides	Carlton	31 July	Hip injury; had already planned to retire at the end of the season.
Mark Ricciuto	Adelaide	16 August	Body could no longer cope with AFL football.
Matthew Robbins	Western Bulldogs	24 August	Struggled throughout the year despite having a ripping 2006 season.
Josh Mahoney	Port Adelaide	24 August	Unable to hold down a regular position.
Troy Cook	Fremantle	24 August	It seemed the right time for him to leave the game.
Shane Parker	Fremantle	24 August	Was always going to struggle to play the year out and there was no way he could continue.
Chris Scott	Brisbane Lions	25 August	Injury.
Ray Hall	Richmond	28 August	Serious hip injury that had sidelined him for the entire 2007 season.
Trent Knobel	Richmond	28 August	Persistent ankle injury.
Kent Kingsley	Richmond	28 August	Injury.
Darryl Wakelin	Port Adelaide	29 August	Struggled with injury.
Matthew Lappin	Carlton	29 August	To help his club focus on playing younger players.
Nathan Brown	Melbourne	29 August	Ready to start the next chapter of his life.
Clint Bizzell	Melbourne	29 August	Right time to do so.
Byron Pickett	Melbourne	31 August	Waning passion for the game.
Chris Johnson	Brisbane Lions	31 August	Decided to leave the game – he was the last ever Fitzroy player in the AFL.
Andrew Thompson	St Kilda	1 September	Right time to do so.
Matthew Clarke	St Kilda	1 September	One year contract expired; he decided to leave the game.
James Hird	Essendon	1 September	Right time to do so.
Josh Wooden	West Coast	5 September	Nagging hip injury.
Richie Vandenberg	Hawthorn	6 September	Due to a troublesome back injury, his body could not cope any more.
Brett Voss	St Kilda	18 September	Made the most of his time as an AFL footballer.
Ben Dixon	Hawthorn	19 September	Inability of his body to prepare well enough for senior football.
Rowan Jones	West Coast	19 September	Right time to do so.
Glenn Archer	Kangaroos	22 September	Right time to do so.
James Clement	Collingwood	23 September	Family health; right time to do so.
Joel Smith	Hawthorn	25 September	Thought the time was right, it was time to move on.
Kasey Green	Kangaroos	26 September	Wanted to move back to Perth.
Chris Heffernan	Essendon	2 October	His opportunities to play senior football beyond 2007 were limited.
Scott Camporeale	Essendon	2 October	Injury.
Chris Grant	Western Bulldogs	2 October	Injury and right time to do so.
Aaron Hamill	St Kilda	2 October	Injury and right time to do so; he felt it was in the best interest of the club moving forward.
Mark Bolton	Essendon	3 October	Had been struggling to make the starting 22 in 2007 and recognised the right time to do so.
Nathan Buckley	Collingwood	5 October	Chronic hamstring injuries had curtailed his ability to remain fit for selection.
Paul Licuria	Collingwood	5 October	Battled injury and form problems this season.
Nathan Ablett	Geelong	5 October	Ending career after winning 2007 Premiership.
Justin Longmuir	Fremantle	31 October	Chronic knee injury.
Stephen Doyle	Sydney	31 October	Series of knee injuries.
Lance Whitnall	Carlton	12 November	Knee injury.

Player	Club	Date
Craig Flint	Carlton	6 September 2007
Dylan McLaren	Carlton	6 September 2007
Anthony Raso	Carlton	6 September 2007
David Teague	Carlton	6 September 2007
Ross Young	Carlton	6 September 2007
Simon Godfrey	Melbourne	11 September 2007
Daniel Hayes (rookie)	Melbourne	11 September 2007
Shane Neaves (rookie)	Melbourne	11 September 2007
Heath Neville	Melbourne	11 September 2007
Daniel Ward	Melbourne	11 September 2007
Travis Baird	Western Bulldogs	12 September 2007
Cameron Faulkner	Western Bulldogs	12 September 2007
Damien McCormack	Western Bulldogs	12 September 2007
Marty Pask (rookie)	Western Bulldogs	12 September 2007
Tim Walsh	Western Bulldogs	12 September 2007
Michael West (rookie)	Western Bulldogs	12 September 2007
Marcus Allan	Brisbane Lions	22 September 2007
Ben Fixter	Brisbane Lions	22 September 2007
Ben Hughes (rookie)	Kangaroos	26 September 2007
Tim Hutchison (rookie)	Kangaroos	26 September 2007
Daniel McConnell	Kangaroos	26 September 2007
Callum Urch	Kangaroos	26 September 2007
Djaran Whyman	Kangaroos	26 September 2007
Phillip Raymond	St Kilda	4 October 2007
Justin Sweeney	St Kilda	4 October 2007
Matthew Bode	Adelaide	12 October 2007
John Hinge	Adelaide	12 October 2007
Ian Perrie	Adelaide	12 October 2007
Darren Pfeiffer	Adelaide	12 October 2007
Jason Torney	Adelaide	12 October 2007
Richard Cole	Essendon	12 October 2007
Lance Whitnall	Carlton	12 October 2007
Mark Johnson	Essendon	15 October 2007
Kepler Bradley	Essendon	15 October 2007
Lachlan McKinnon (rookie)	Essendon	15 October 2007
Ryan Ferguson	Melbourne	15 October 2007
Matthew Little	Hawthorn	16 October 2007
Josh Thurgood	Hawthorn	16 October 2007
Matthew Davis (rookie)	Sydney	17 October 2007
Simon Phillips	Sydney	17 October 2007
Earl Shaw (rookie)	Sydney	17 October 2007
Jonathan Simpkin	Sydney	17 October 2007
Luke Vogels	Sydney	17 October 2007
Barry Brooks	St Kilda	17 October 2007
Fergus Watts	St Kilda	17 October 2007
Ben Cousins (Note: Ben Cousins was sacked by the West Coast after he was arrested on drug charges.)	West Coast	17 October 2007
Todd Grima (rookie)	Geelong	18 October 2007
Joel Reynolds (rookie)	Geelong	18 October 2007
Sam Hunt	Geelong	18 October 2007
Stephen Owen	Geelong	18 October 2007
Matthew Spencer	Geelong	18 October 2007
Patrick Bowden	Richmond	22 October 2007
Tasman Clingan (rookie)	Richmond	22 October 2007
Brent Hartigan	Richmond	22 October 2007
Andrew Krakouer	Richmond	22 October 2007
Clayton Collard	Fremantle	22 October 2007
Ryley Dunn	Fremantle	22 October 2007
Robert Haddrill	Fremantle	22 October 2007
Calib Mourish	Fremantle	22 October 2007
James Walker	Fremantle	22 October 2007
David Trotter	Kangaroos	23 October 2007
Ashley Sampi	West Coast	30 October 2007
Daniel Chick	West Coast	31 October 2007
Guy Richards	Collingwood	31 October 2007
Nathan Batsanis (rookie)	Port Adelaide	16 November 2007
Peter Hardy (rookie)	Port Adelaide	16 November 2007
Alex Lee (rookie)	Port Adelaide	16 November 2007
Ryan Willits	Port Adelaide	16 November 2007

== 2007 national draft ==
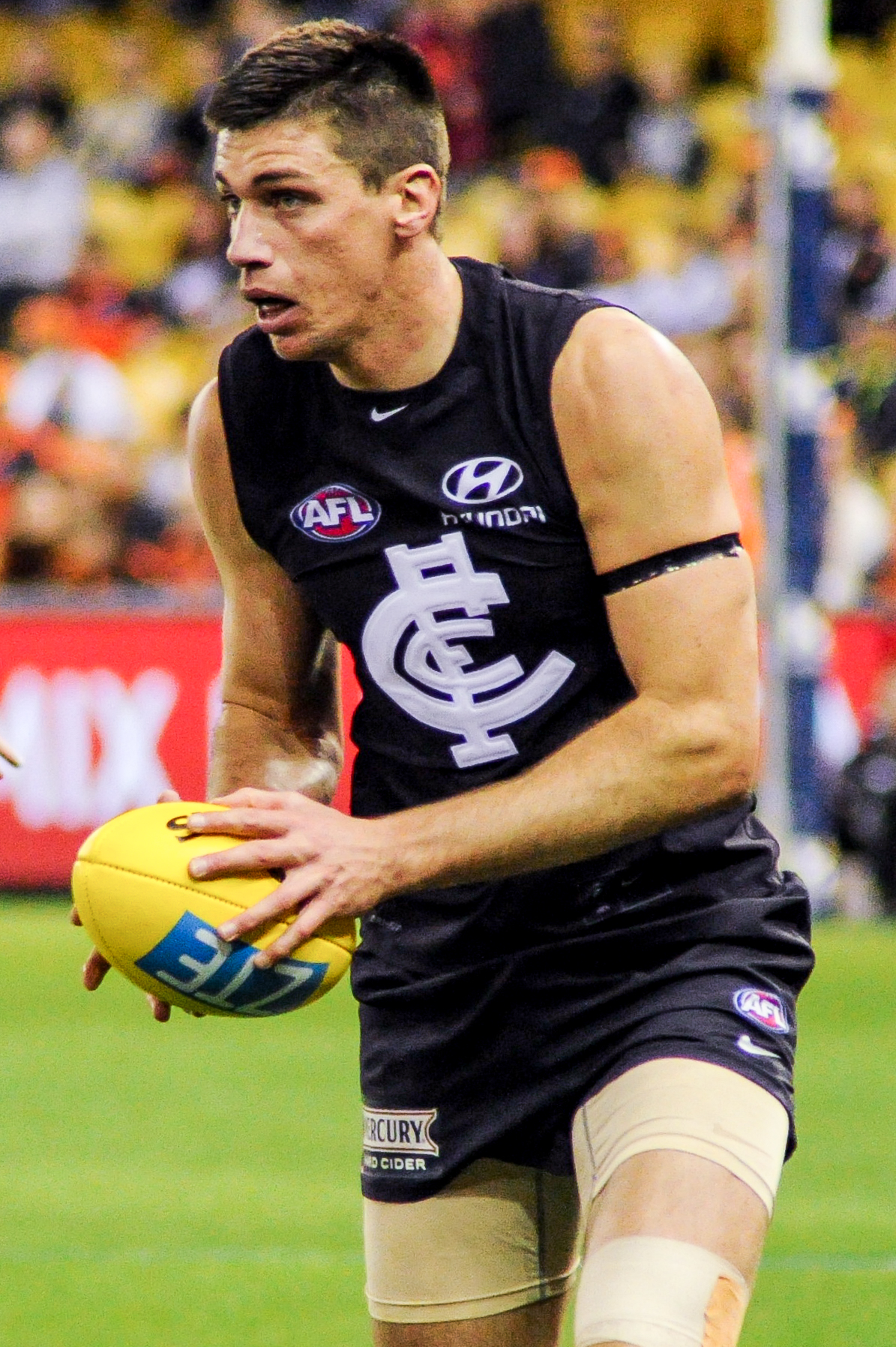
Matthew Kreuzer, pick 1

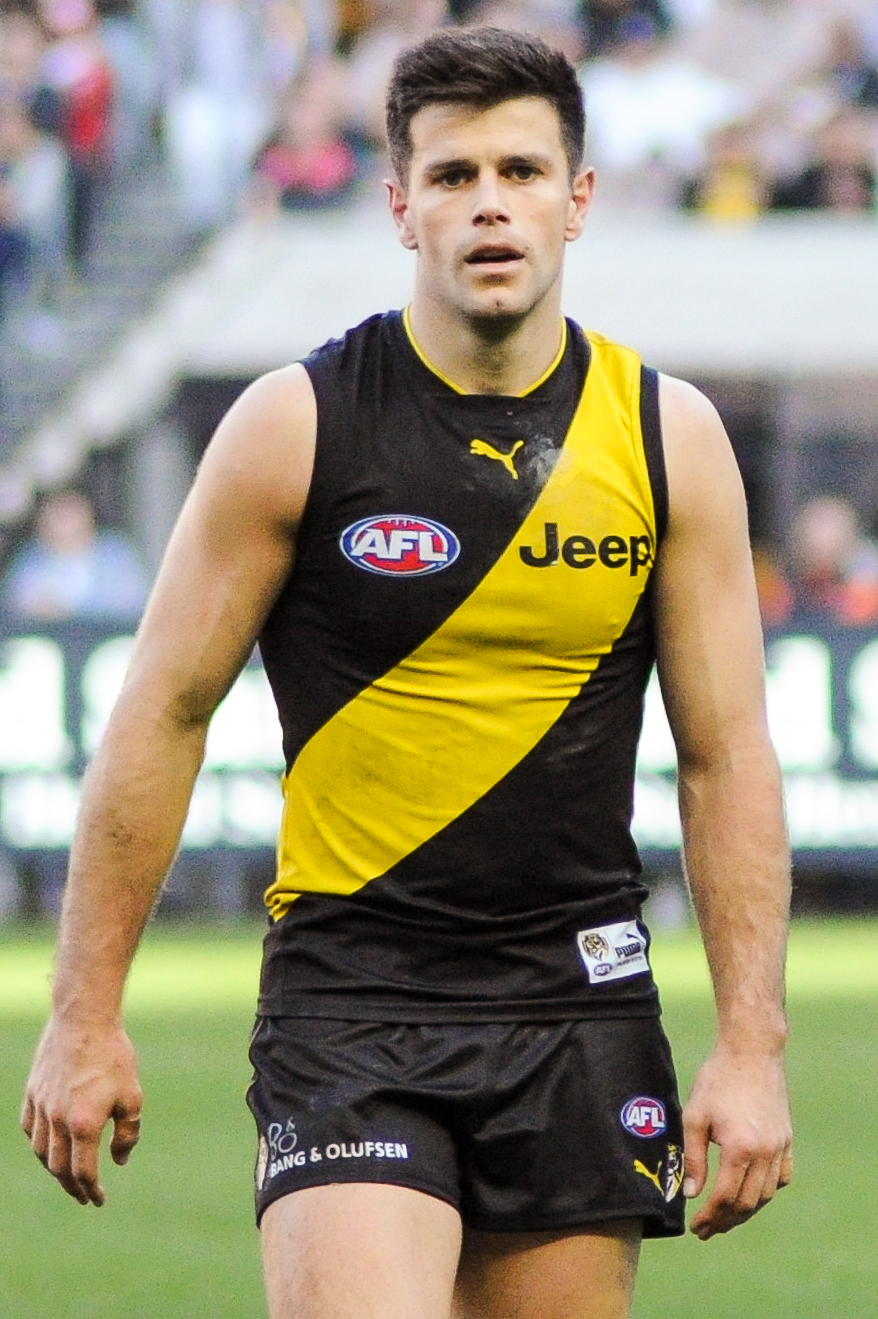
Trent Cotchin, pick 2

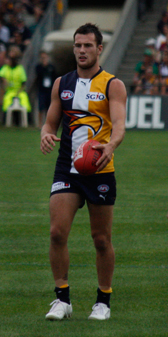
Chris Masten, pick 3

*	Denotes player who has been a premiership player and been selected for at least one All-Australian team
^{+}	Denotes player who has been a premiership player at least once
^{x}	Denotes player who has been selected for at least one All-Australian team
^{#}	Denotes player who has never played in a VFL/AFL home and away season or finals game
^{~}	Denotes player who has been selected as Rising Star

Round	Pick	Player	Recruited from	League	Club
Priority	1	Matthew Kreuzer	Northern Knights	TAC Cup	Carlton
1	2	Trent Cotchin	Northern Knights	TAC Cup	Richmond
1	3	Chris Masten	East Fremantle	WAFL	West Coast
1	4	Cale Morton	Claremont	WAFL	Melbourne
1	5	Jarrad Grant	Dandenong Stingrays	TAC Cup	Western Bulldogs
1	6	David Myers	Perth	WAFL	Essendon
1	7	Rhys Palmer	East Fremantle	WAFL	Fremantle
1	8	Lachlan Henderson	Geelong Falcons	TAC Cup	Brisbane Lions
1	9	Ben McEvoy	Murray Bushrangers	TAC Cup	St Kilda
1	10	Patrick Dangerfield	Geelong Falcons	TAC Cup	Adelaide
1	11	Patrick Veszpremi	Northern Knights	TAC Cup	Sydney
1	12	Cyril Rioli	St Mary's	NTFL	Hawthorn
1	13	Brad Ebert	Port Adelaide Magpies	SANFL	West Coast
1	14	Jack Grimes	Northern Knights	TAC Cup	Melbourne
1	15	Robbie Tarrant	Bendigo Pioneers	TAC Cup	Kangaroos
1	16	Matthew Lobbe	Eastern Ranges	TAC Cup	Port Adelaide
1	17	Harry Taylor	East Fremantle	WAFL	Geelong
Priority	18	Alex Rance	Swan Districts	WAFL	Richmond
2	19	Callan Ward	Western Jets	TAC Cup	Western Bulldogs
2	20	Tony Notte	Swan Districts	WAFL	West Coast
2	21	Addam Maric	Calder Cannons	TAC Cup	Melbourne
2	22	Scott Selwood	Bendigo Pioneers	TAC Cup	West Coast
2	23	Tayte Pears	East Perth	WAFL	Essendon
2	24	Clayton Hinkley	North Ballarat Rebels	TAC Cup	Fremantle
2	25	Tom Collier	Tassie Mariners	TAC Cup	Brisbane Lions
2	26	Brett Meredith	Northern Knights	TAC Cup	Sydney
2	27	Andy Otten	Oakleigh Chargers	TAC Cup	Adelaide
2	28	Marlon Motlop	Wanderers	NTFL	Port Adelaide
2	29	Brendan Whitecross	Zillmere	QAFL	Hawthorn
2	30	Jarrhan Jacky	Subiaco	WAFL	Adelaide
2	31	John McCarthy	Dandenong Stingrays	TAC Cup	Collingwood
2	32	Levi Greenwood	Port Adelaide Magpies	SANFL	Kangaroos
2	33	Matthew Westhoff	Central District	SANFL	Port Adelaide
2	34	Dawson Simpson	Murray Bushrangers	TAC Cup	Geelong
3	35	Sam Reid	Zillmere	QAFL	Western Bulldogs
3	36	Steven Browne	West Perth	WAFL	Carlton
3	37	Scott Thompson	Geelong	VFL	Kangaroos
3	38	Myke Cook	Sandringham Dragons	TAC Cup	Adelaide
3 F/S	39	Darcy Daniher	Calder Cannons	TAC Cup	Essendon
3	40	Chris Mayne	Perth	WAFL	Fremantle
3	41	James Polkinghorne	Calder Cannons	TAC Cup	Brisbane Lions
3	42	Jack Steven	Geelong Falcons	TAC Cup	St Kilda
3	43	Easton Wood	Camperdown/Geelong Grammar School	HFNL	Western Bulldogs
3	44	Scott Simpson	Dandenong Stingrays	TAC Cup	Geelong
3	45	Stuart Dew	Port Adelaide	AFL	Hawthorn
3	46	Dennis Armfield	Swan Districts	WAFL	Carlton
3	47	Toby Thoolen	Bendigo Pioneers	TAC Cup	Collingwood
3	48	Jarrad Boumann	Dandenong Stingrays	TAC Cup	Western Bulldogs
3	49	Mitchell Farmer	Calder Cannons	TAC Cup	Port Adelaide
3	50	Dan McKenna	Gippsland Power	TAC Cup	Geelong
4	51	Dean Putt	Calder Cannons	TAC Cup	Richmond
4	52	Bradd Dalziell	East Fremantle	WAFL	Brisbane Lions
4	53	Kyle Cheney	North Ballarat Rebels	TAC Cup	Melbourne
4	54	Cale Hooker	East Fremantle	WAFL	Essendon
4	55	Mark Johnson	Essendon	AFL	Fremantle
4	56	Matt Austin	North Ballarat Rebels	TAC Cup	Brisbane Lions
4	57	Fraser Gehrig	St Kilda(ret.)	AFL	St Kilda
4	58	Tony Armstrong	NSW/ACT Rams/Calder Cannons	TAC Cup	Adelaide
4	59	Craig Bird	NSW/ACT Rams/Nelson Bay	TAC Cup	Sydney
4 F/S	60	Adam Donohue	Geelong Falcons	TAC Cup	Geelong
4 F/S	61	Jaxson Barham	Geelong Falcons	TAC Cup	Collingwood
4	62	Josh Smith	West Perth	WAFL	Kangaroos
4	63	Guy O'Keefe	Geelong Falcons	TAC Cup	Western Bulldogs
5	64	Pass			Richmond
5	65	Pass			Carlton
5	66	Tom McNamara	South Adelaide	SANFL	Melbourne
5	67	Pass			Western Bulldogs
5	68	Pass			Essendon
5	69	Kepler Bradley	Essendon	AFL	Fremantle
5	70	Eljay Connors	Bendigo Pioneers	TAC Cup	St Kilda
5	71	Aaron Kite	Calder Cannons	TAC Cup	Adelaide
5	72	Blake Grima	Kangaroos	AFL	Kangaroos
6	73	Pass			Melbourne
6	74	Pass			Fremantle
6 (NSW SP)	75	Taylor Walker	NSW/ACT Rams/North Broken Hill	TAC Cup	Adelaide

== 2008 pre-season draft ==
Round	Pick	Player	Recruited from	League	Club
1	1	David Gourdis	Subiaco	WAFL	Richmond
1	2	Darren Pfeiffer	Adelaide	AFL	Carlton
1	3	Stefan Martin	Sandringham	VFL	Melbourne
1	4	Scott Welsh	Adelaide	AFL	Western Bulldogs
1	5	John Williams	Morningside	QAFL	Essendon
1	6	Joshua Head	South Fremantle	WAFL	Fremantle
1	7	Patrick McGinnity	Claremont	WAFL	West Coast
1	8	Tom Bellchambers	Launceston	NTFL (Tas)	Essendon

== 2008 rookie draft ==
Round	Pick	Player	Recruited from	Club
1	1	Clayton Collard	Fremantle	Richmond
1	2	Aaron Joseph	Tassie Mariners	Carlton
1	3	Trent Zomer	Eastern Ranges	Melbourne
1	4	James Mulligan	Southport	Western Bulldogs
1	5	Rhys Magin	Zillmere	Essendon
1	6	Brent Connelly	Gippsland Power	Fremantle
1	7	Phil Smith	Calder Cannons	Brisbane Lions
1	8	Glenn Chivers	Oakleigh Chargers	St Kilda
1	9	James Moss	Central District	Adelaide
1	10	Matthew O'Dwyer	Sydney	Sydney
1	11	Hugh Sandilands	Oakleigh Chargers	Hawthorn
1	12	Lewis Stevenson	Claremont	West Coast
1	13	Luke Casey-Leigh	Sandringham Dragons	Collingwood
1	14	Nathan Grima	Central District	Kangaroos
1	15	Nick Salter	Woodville-West Torrens	Port Adelaide
1	16	Brodie Moles	Tasmania	Geelong
2	17	Jarrod Silvester	Coburg Tigers	Richmond
2	18	Lachlan Hill	Oakleigh Chargers	Carlton
2	19	Austin Wonaeamirri	St Mary's Football Club	Melbourne
2	20	Henry White	North Adelaide	Western Bulldogs
2	21	Jarrod Atkinson	Bendigo Bombers	Essendon
2	22	Luke Pratt	Swan Districts	Fremantle
2	23	Pat Garner	Brisbane Lions	Brisbane Lions
2	24	Luke Miles	Swan Districts	St Kilda
2	25	Jared Petrenko	Woodville-West Torrens	Adelaide
2	26	Brendan Murphy	County Carlow (Gaelic football)	Sydney
2	27	Timothy Walsh	Port Adelaide Magpies	Hawthorn
2	28	Ashley Arrowsmith	Calder Cannons	West Coast
2	29	Kevin Dyas	County Armagh (Gaelic football)	Collingwood
2	30	Cruize Garlett	Perth	Kangaroos
2	31	Daniel Boyle	Murray Bushrangers	Port Adelaide
2	32	Jeremy Laidler	Calder Cannons	Geelong
3	33	Tristan Cartledge	Essendon	Richmond
3	34	David Ellard	Swan Districts	Carlton
3	35	Jake Spencer	Redland Bombers	Melbourne
3	36	John Shaw	Sandringham Dragons	Western Bulldogs
3	37	Calib Mourish	Fremantle	Fremantle
3	38	Pearce Hanley	County Mayo (Gaelic football)	Brisbane Lions
3	39	Andrew McQualter	St Kilda	St Kilda
3	40	Ed Curnow	Geelong Falcons	Adelaide
3	41	Jake Orreal	Unregistered	Sydney
3	42	Alex Grima	Tassie Mariners	Hawthorn
3	43	Will Sullivan	Western Jets	West Coast
3	44	Alan Obst	Adelaide	Kangaroos
3	45	Ryan Willits	Port Adelaide	Port Adelaide
3	46	Chris Kangars	Geelong Falcons	Geelong
4	47	Cameron Howat	Richmond	Richmond
4	48	Michael Shields	County Cork (Gaelic football)	Carlton
4	49	Shane Valenti	Sandringham Zebras	Melbourne
4	50	Ryley Dunn	Fremantle	Fremantle
4	51	Khan Haretuku	UNSW Eastern Suburbs	St Kilda
4	52	Brodie Martin	Sturt	Adelaide
4	53	Matthew Beckmans	Turvey Park	Sydney
4	54	Cameron Stokes	Darwin	Hawthorn
4	55	Callum Wilson	South Fremantle	West Coast
4	56	Michael Wundke	North Adelaide	Kangaroos
4	57	Shane Mumford	Geelong (VFL)	Geelong
5	58	Aaron Bruce	Eastlake	Sydney
5	59	Beau Maister	West Coast	West Coast
5	60	James Wilsen	St George	Kangaroos
6	61	Dean Terlich	Murray Bushrangers	Sydney
6	62	Ryan Davis	North Shore Bombers	West Coast

== Draft firsts ==
This draft has been the first ever draft where elevated NSW scholarship players (Taylor Walker, Craig Bird, Ryan Davis, James Wilsen, Khan Haretuku) were drafted to their respective clubs by the draft under the rule, clubs must give up their last selection in either rookie or senior draft in order to draft that elevated scholarship player.

== Selections by league ==
National and Pre-season draft selection totals by leagues:

League	Players selected	State
TAC Cup	40	VIC
WAFL	18	WA
SANFL	4	SA
QAFL	3	QLD
VFL	2	VIC
NTFL	2	NT
HFNL	1	VIC
