= Australian Football League draft =

Annual draft of unsigned players

The Australian Football League draft is the annual draft of unsigned players, especially new nominations, by Australian rules football teams that participate in the main competition of that sport, the Australian Football League (AFL).

== History ==
When the competition was known as the Victorian Football League (VFL), the league introduced the first incarnation of a draft system in 1981, where teams had two selections each of interstate players determined by reverse finishing position order.

The draft was introduced as an equalisation strategy in response to the increasing transfer fees and player salaries at the time, which in combination with declining attendances threatened to derail the league. It was also a result of the failure of country zoning, introduced in 1967, which had led to a systematic inequality whereby the clubs with the best zones, like Carlton and Hawthorn, could dominate over clubs with poorer zones like Melbourne.

In 1986, the first of the modern VFL Drafts was held. The draft was run in conjunction with the existing zone system. Players from West Australian Football League and the new West Coast Eagles were excluded from the 1986 draft, with the Eagles able to recruit up to 35 West Australian players with no more than 6 players from any single WAFL club. The other new club for the 1987 VFL season, the Brisbane Bears, received 6 concessionary picks before the other clubs and exclusive access to all Queensland based players.

Since then, the rules associated with priority picks, zone allocations, the father–son rule, mid-year, pre-season and rookie drafts, expansion clubs concessions and trading of players and picks have been frequently changed, but the basic premise of draft being an equalisation measure to assist poorer performing teams has remained.

== Draft ==
In the AFL draft, clubs receive picks based on the position in which they finish on the ladder during the season. The draft is held each year at the end of November, to allow the draftees to finish their school examinations before being drafted.

=== Eligibility ===
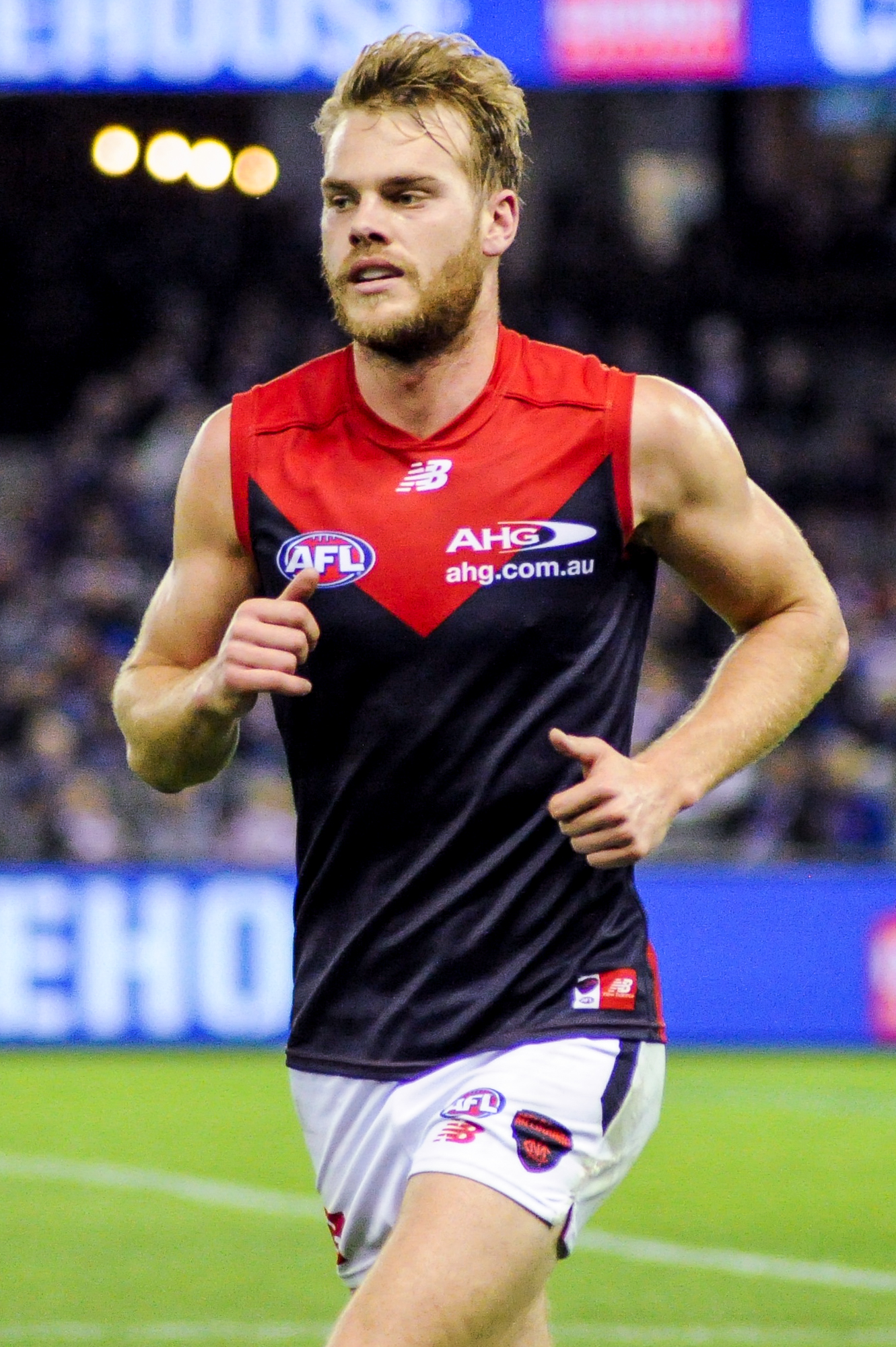
Jack Watts, the first pick of the 2008 AFL draft, was drafted at the age of 17. Effective from the next year, players must be at least 18 years of age on 31 December to be eligible to be drafted

From the 2009 draft, players must be at least 18 years of age on 31 December in the year in which they are drafted, so that players who turn 18 during their first months of Year 12 will be able to finish studying without the pressure of AFL. This was increased over the past few years due to concerns about school age players potentially having to leave home to play football interstate.

A selection of approximately 50 players are chosen to attend the annual AFL Draft Combine at the conclusion of the AFL season, prior to the National Draft. Further smaller scale state screenings are held around the country in the weeks after the national combine.

=== Priority draft pick rule ===
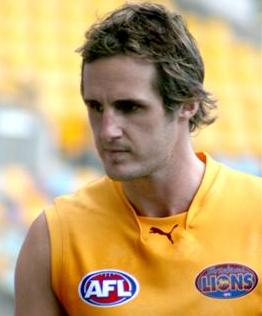
Travis Johnstone, the first pick of the 1997 AFL draft, was drafted with a priority draft pick

The priority draft picks were first introduced in the 1993 AFL draft as a special assistance rule to aid teams that consistently perform poorly to obtain additional early draft selections.

Under the rules in place since the 2012 season, priority draft picks are given out to struggling teams at the discretion of the AFL Commission. This replaced a system in which a priority draft pick was automatically given to team whose win–loss record fell below a pre-defined value; this had become controversial, and there were accusations by commentators that teams out of finals contention would tank at the end of the season to gain access to the additional draft picks, although the AFL itself never brought such accusations against any club.

=== Zone Allocation rule ===
Northern Club Academies: GWS, Sydney, Gold Coast and Brisbane all have club-based academies that help develop talented athletes, sometimes from before they’re teenagers, into AFL prospects in markets where the code isn’t seen as the No. 1 sport. The four clubs have priority access to those players via a bidding system.

Next Generation Academies: Clubs outside of New South Wales and Queensland have established academies with players from multicultural and Indigenous backgrounds, meaning they have priority access to the players they’ve developed via a bidding system.

=== Father–son rule ===
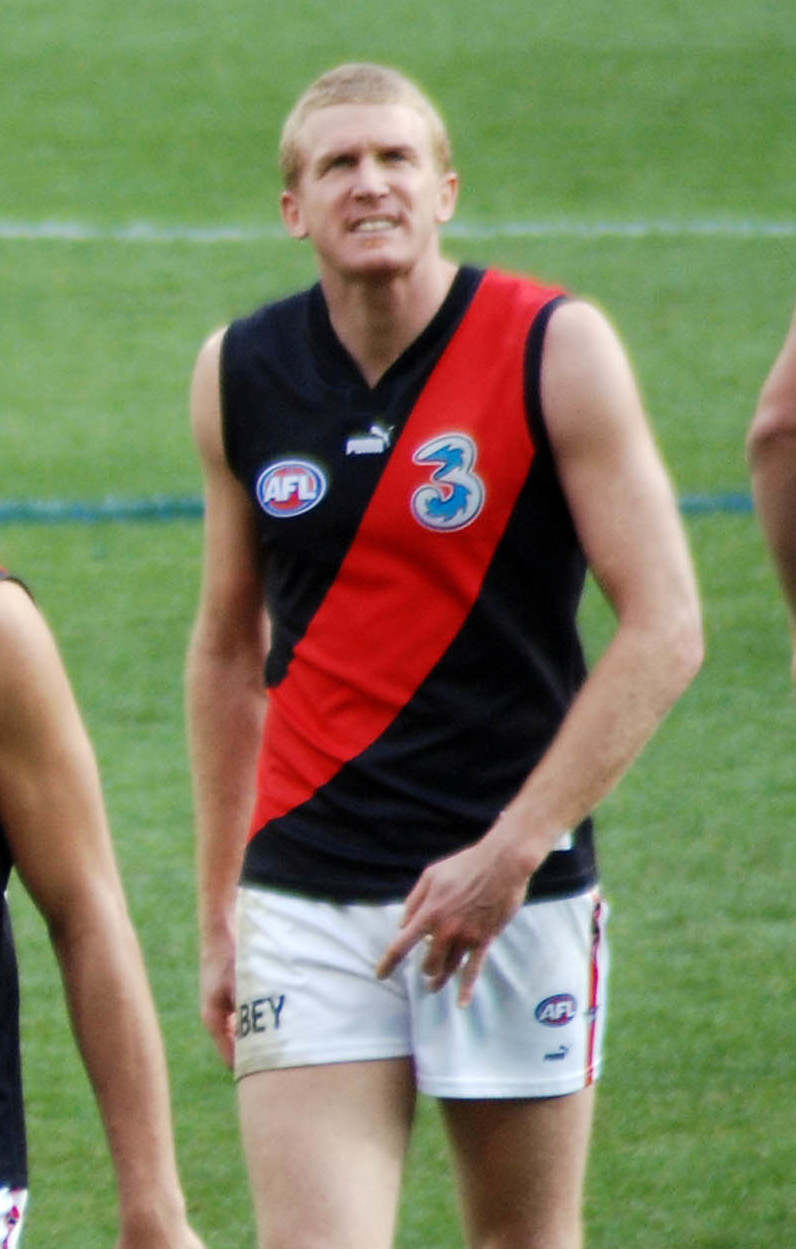
Dustin Fletcher, the son of Ken Fletcher has played the most games of any father–son selection, with 400 AFL matches played

To continue the traditions of association that a family has with a particular club, sons of former players are able to be selected by the same club as their father played with under the father–son rule.

For clubs with an established history in the VFL/AFL (20 years or more), the father must have played at least 100 games for the club to be eligible for the father/son rule; clubs with no long term history in the league had different eligibility criteria based on their state leagues.

Under current rules, players eligible under the father–son rule are selected in a bidding system prior to the draft. Firstly, any club in the league may nominate a draft pick with which it intends to take the eligible son; then, if the father's club wishes to draft the son, it must use its next available draft pick, after the highest bidder.

Earlier versions of the father–son rule allowed the sons to be recruited automatically, without need for the draft, or allowed the club to recruit the son using a third round draft pick. The father–son rule itself was introduced in 1949, more than three decades prior to the draft, and it could be used to contravene zoning rules.

==== AFL Women's: Father–daughter rule and future rules for AFL Women's players ====
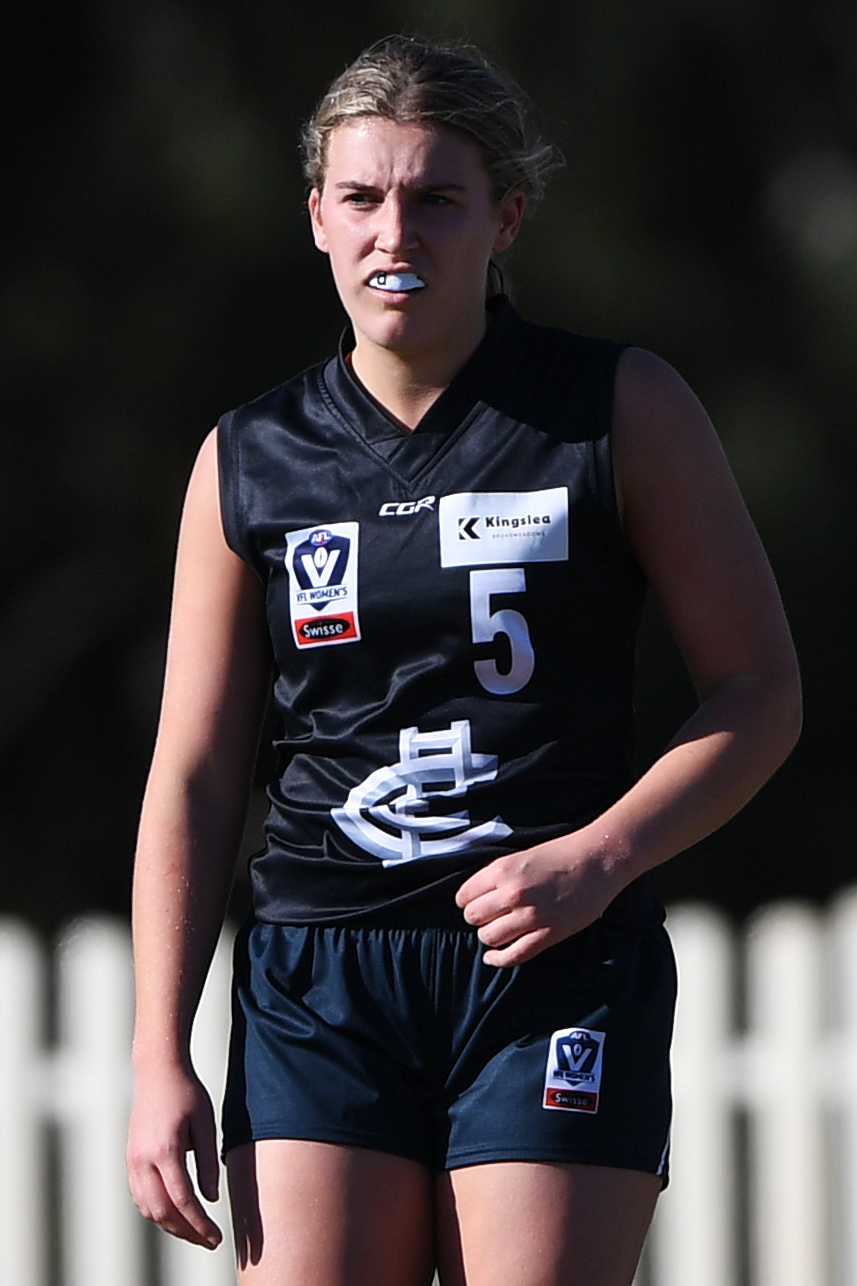
Abbie McKay, the daughter of Andrew McKay, was the first player to be selected under the father–daughter rule

On 15 September 2016, an AFL women's competition, the AFLW, was founded to commence in 2017.

In its Draft, there is an equivalent father–daughter rule, where a daughter can be drafted if their father played one game at the club. The first use of this rule was in the 2017 Draft, when Carlton selected Abbie McKay, the daughter of Andrew McKay.

Criteria are also in place for mother–son and mother–daughter rules, from such time that the children of AFLW players reach draft eligible age.

=== Expansion clubs ===
Each time that the competition has an expansion team, the AFL has given special priority to the new club, with the new club receiving numerous high draft picks.

== Host ==
For most of its existence, the National Draft has been held at a large function or convention centre with many of the predicted top draft selections in attendance.

Since 1993, the National draft has been televised live, pick-by-pick, while the mid-year (1990–1993), pre-season and rookie drafts have never been televised.

| Draft | Date held | Host city | Venue |
|---|---|---|---|
| 1981 | 8 October 1981 | Melbourne, Victoria | VFL House |
| 1982 | 19 October 1982 | Melbourne, Victoria | VFL House |
| 1986 | 26 November 1986 | Melbourne, Victoria | VFL House |
| 1987 | 11 November 1987 | Melbourne, Victoria | VFL House |
| 1988 | 9 November 1988 | Melbourne, Victoria | VFL House |
| 1989 | 9 November 1989 | Melbourne, Victoria | VFL House |
| 1990 | 7 November 1990 | Melbourne, Victoria | AFL House |
| 1991 | 6 November 1991 | Melbourne, Victoria | AFL House |
| 1992 | 11 November 1992 | | |
| 1993 | 29 October 1993 | Melbourne, Victoria | Radisson President Hotel |
| 1994 | 28 October 1994 | Melbourne, Victoria | Radisson President Hotel |
| 1995 | 8 December 1995 | | |
| 1996 | 25 October 1996 | | |
| 1997 | 31 October 1997 | Adelaide, South Australia | Football Park |
| 1998 | 1 November 1998 | Melbourne, Victoria | Melbourne Park Function Centre |
| 1999 | 31 October 1999 | Melbourne, Victoria | Melbourne Park Function Centre |
| 2000 | 29 October 2000 | | |
| 2001 | 25 November 2001 | Melbourne, Victoria | Melbourne Park Function Centre |
| 2002 | 23 November 2002 | Melbourne, Victoria | Melbourne Park Function Centre |
| 2003 | 22 November 2003 | Melbourne, Victoria | Melbourne Park Function Centre |
| 2004 | 20 November 2004 | Melbourne, Victoria | Melbourne Park Function Centre |
| 2005 | 26 November 2005 | Melbourne, Victoria | Docklands Stadium |
| 2006 | 25 November 2006 | Melbourne, Victoria | Docklands Stadium |
| 2007 | 24 November 2007 | Melbourne, Victoria | Docklands Stadium |
| 2008 | 29 November 2008 | Melbourne, Victoria | Docklands Stadium |
| 2009 | 26 November 2009 | Melbourne, Victoria | Melbourne Convention and Exhibition Centre |
| 2010 | 18 November 2010 | Gold Coast, Queensland | Gold Coast Convention and Exhibition Centre |
| 2011 | 24 November 2011 | Sydney, New South Wales | Sydney Olympic Park Sports Centre |
| 2012 | 22 November 2012 | Gold Coast, Queensland | Gold Coast Convention and Exhibition Centre |
| 2013 | 21 November 2013 | Gold Coast, Queensland | Gold Coast Convention and Exhibition Centre |
| 2014 | 27 November 2014 | Gold Coast, Queensland | Gold Coast Convention and Exhibition Centre |
| 2015 | 22 November 2015 | Adelaide, South Australia | Adelaide Convention Centre |
| 2016 | 25 November 2016 | Sydney, New South Wales | Hordern Pavilion |
| 2017 | 24 November 2017 | Sydney, New South Wales | Hordern Pavilion |
| 2018 | 22 November 2018 | Melbourne, Victoria | Marvel Stadium |
| 2019 | 27 November 2019 | Melbourne, Victoria | Marvel Stadium |
| 2021 | 24 November 2021 | Melbourne, Victoria | Marvel Stadium |
| 2022 | 28 November 2022 | Melbourne, Victoria | Marvel Stadium |
| 2023 | 20 November 2023 | Melbourne, Victoria | Marvel Stadium |
| 2024 | 20 November 2024 | Melbourne, Victoria | Marvel Stadium |
| 2025 | 21 November 2025 | Melbourne, Victoria | Marvel Stadium |

== Number-one draft picks ==
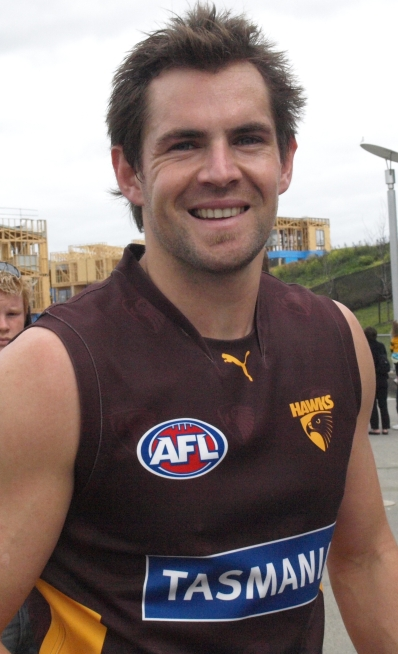
Luke Hodge, the first pick in the 2001 AFL draft. Hodge has played the most VFL/AFL games of any number-one draft pick (346 games played), is the only number-one draft pick to win a Norm Smith Medal, is one of just five number-one draft picks to have won a premiership, and has won the most premierships of any number-one draft pick (4)

=== Men's ===
As of 2025, the number one draft pick was taken by the last-placed team from the previous season, or an expansion team in its first draft, in 33 of the 42 drafts.

Years where this was not the case are:

- Where the number one pick has been traded, for example when Fremantle traded the number one pick of the 2001 AFL draft to Hawthorn for Trent Croad. Other trades took place in 1988, 1990, 1992 and 2022.
- In 1996, where West Coast were given the first draft pick for being the lowest-ranked team to have lost an uncontracted player (Ian Downsborough) to expansion team Port Adelaide: the team that finished last, Fitzroy, had its AFL playing operations taken over by Brisbane at the end of 1996.
- In 2002, where Carlton, who had finished last, lost their priority picks and their first and second round picks for salary cap breaches. St. Kilda, who had finished 15th of the 16 teams, received the first draft pick and selected Brendon Goddard.
- In 2007, where Carlton, who had finished 15th of the 16 teams, received the number one draft pick by virtue of the priority pick rules at the time. The team that finished last, Richmond, received the second overall pick and also received a priority pick at the end of the first round.
- In 2020, where Adelaide, who had finished last, bid on Western Bulldogs Next Generation Academy member Jamarra Ugle-Hagan, and the Bulldogs matched the bid with picks 29, 33, 41, 42, 52 and 54. This made Ugle-Hagan the official first pick and Adelaide's eventual selection, Riley Thilthorpe, the second pick.

Despite the expectations of the number one pick, not all have forged successful VFL/AFL careers. Adam Cooney, the first pick of the 2003 AFL draft, was the first number one draft pick to be awarded the prestigious Brownlow Medal in 2008. Along with Matt Rowell, who won the award in 2025, they are the only first pick Brownlow Medallists to date. In 2008, Luke Hodge, the number one pick in 2001, won the Norm Smith Medal with Hawthorn, and remains the only first-pick Norm Smith Medallist to date. No number one selection has yet been inducted into the Australian Football Hall of Fame. Only five number one picks have won a premiership (Drew Banfield, Des Headland, Luke Hodge, Tom Boyd and Cam Rayner).

Since 2023, the number one draft pick also receives the Allen Aylett Medal, with the first medal being awarded to Harley Reid who was drafted number one to the West Coast Eagles.

The following is a list of the number one overall draft picks since the draft's inception in 1981:

| Draft | Player | Selected by | Recruited from | League recruited from |
|---|---|---|---|---|
| 1981 | Alan Johnson | Melbourne | Perth | WAFL |
| 1982 | Andrew Purser | Footscray | East Fremantle | WAFL |
| 1986 | Martin Leslie | Brisbane Bears | Port Adelaide Magpies | SANFL |
| 1987 | Richard Lounder | Richmond | Central District | SANFL |
| 1988 | Alex McDonald | Hawthorn | Ballarat YCW | Ballarat Football League |
| 1989 | Anthony Banik | Richmond | Won Wron Woodside | Alberton Football League |
| 1990 | Stephen Hooper | Geelong | East Perth | WAFL |
| 1991 | John Hutton | Brisbane Bears | Claremont | WAFL |
| 1992 | Drew Banfield | West Coast Eagles | Subiaco | WAFL |
| 1993 | Darren Gaspar | Sydney | South Fremantle | WAFL |
| 1994 | Jeff White | Fremantle | Dandenong Stingrays | TAC Cup |
| 1995 | Clive Waterhouse | Fremantle | Port Adelaide Magpies | SANFL |
| 1996 | Michael Gardiner | West Coast Eagles | Claremont | WAFL |
| 1997 | Travis Johnstone | Melbourne | Dandenong Stingrays | TAC Cup |
| 1998 | Des Headland | Brisbane Lions | Subiaco | WAFL |
| 1999 | Josh Fraser | Collingwood | Murray Bushrangers | TAC Cup |
| 2000 | Nick Riewoldt | St Kilda | Southport Sharks | QAFL |
| 2001 | Luke Hodge | Hawthorn | Geelong Falcons | TAC Cup |
| 2002 | Brendon Goddard | St Kilda | Gippsland Power | TAC Cup |
| 2003 | Adam Cooney | Western Bulldogs | West Adelaide | SANFL |
| 2004 | Brett Deledio | Richmond | Murray Bushrangers | TAC Cup |
| 2005 | Marc Murphy | Carlton | Oakleigh Chargers | TAC Cup |
| 2006 | Bryce Gibbs | Carlton | Glenelg | SANFL |
| 2007 | Matthew Kreuzer | Carlton | Northern Knights | TAC Cup |
| 2008 | Jack Watts | Melbourne | Sandringham Dragons | TAC Cup |
| 2009 | Tom Scully | Melbourne | Dandenong Stingrays | TAC Cup |
| 2010 | David Swallow | Gold Coast | East Fremantle Football Club | WAFL |
| 2011 | Jonathon Patton | Greater Western Sydney | Eastern Ranges | TAC Cup |
| 2012 | Lachie Whitfield | Greater Western Sydney | Dandenong Stingrays | TAC Cup |
| 2013 | Tom Boyd | Greater Western Sydney | Eastern Ranges | TAC Cup |
| 2014 | Paddy McCartin | St Kilda | Geelong Falcons | TAC Cup |
| 2015 | Jacob Weitering | Carlton | Dandenong Stingrays | TAC Cup |
| 2016 | Andrew McGrath | Essendon | Sandringham Dragons | TAC Cup |
| 2017 | Cameron Rayner | Brisbane Lions | Western Jets | TAC Cup |
| 2018 | Sam Walsh | Carlton | Geelong Falcons | TAC Cup |
| 2019 | Matt Rowell | Gold Coast | Oakleigh Chargers | NAB League |
| 2020 | Jamarra Ugle-Hagan | Western Bulldogs | Oakleigh Chargers | NAB League |
| 2021 | Jason Horne-Francis | North Melbourne | South Adelaide | SANFL |
| 2022 | Aaron Cadman | Greater Western Sydney | Greater Western Victoria Rebels | NAB League |
| 2023 | Harley Reid | West Coast | Bendigo Pioneers | Talent League |
| 2024 | Sam Lalor | Richmond | Greater Western Victoria Rebels | Talent League |
| 2025 | Willem Duursma | West Coast | Gippsland Power | Talent League |
| 2026 | Dougie Cochrane | Port Adelaide | Central District | SANFL |

=== Women's ===
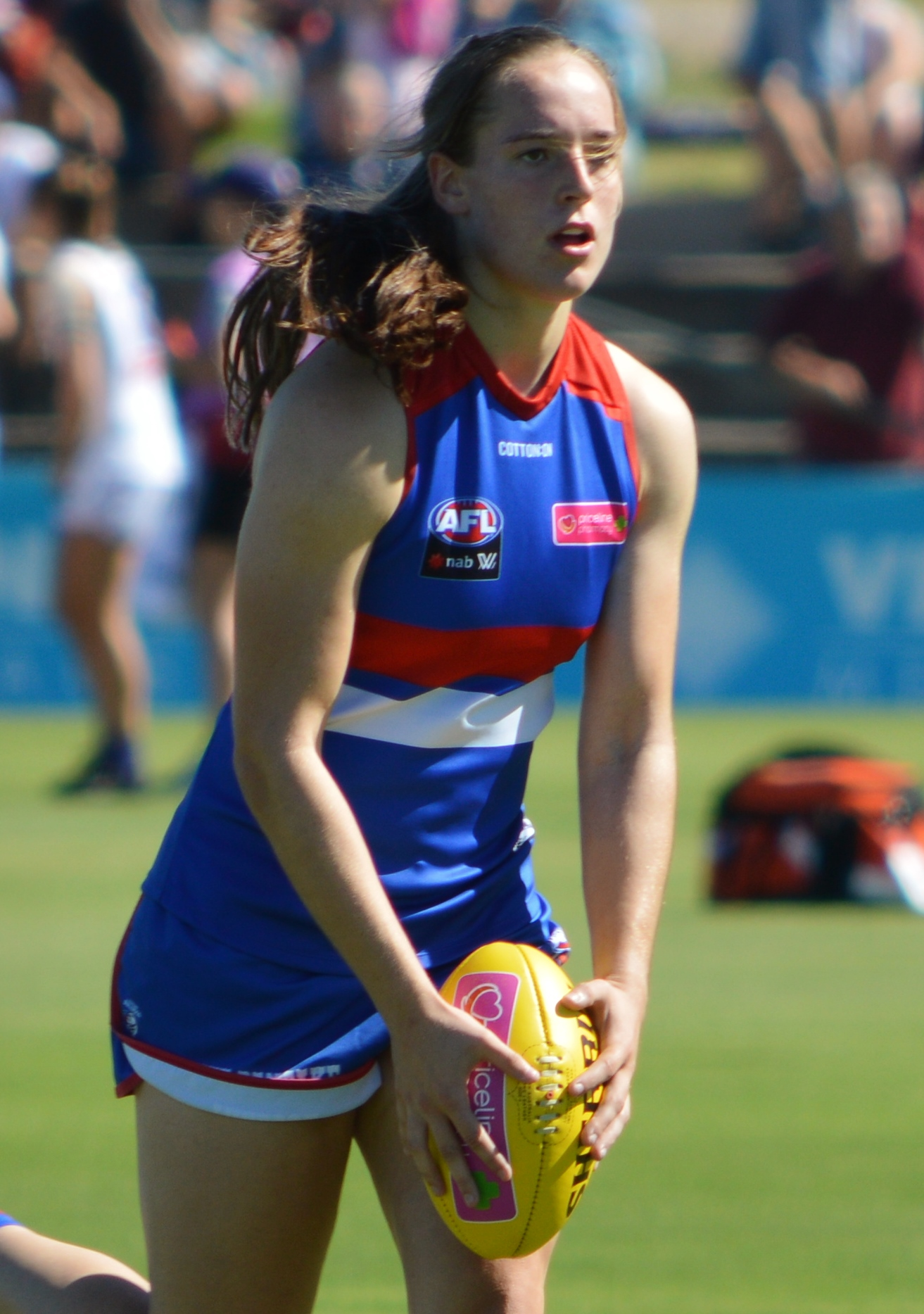
Isabel Huntington, the first pick in the 2017 AFL Women's draft. Huntington is the first number-one draft pick to be selected for the AFL Women's All-Australian team, the first number-one draft pick to be selected for the AFL Women's 22 Under 22 team, and the first number-one draft pick to win the AFL Women's Rising Star award

With the introduction of a women's competition in 2016 (to commence in 2017), a draft was set up for the AFLW.

In 2016, the first draft pick was awarded to the GWS Giants by lot, though this selection would be taken after 16 selections were made for marquee players: Nicola Barr was the first player to be drafted in AFLW history.

In 2018, the first pick was awarded to Geelong as one of the expansion clubs for the 2019 season, and in 2022, the first pick awarded to Sydney as one of the expansion clubs for Season 7: in both years, this was determined by lot from the four expansion clubs.

As of 2022, five of the eight seasons have seen the first pick go to the club who finished last, or an expansion club in its first draft: in 2017, GWS traded the first pick to the Western Bulldogs; in 2019, expansion club Richmond traded the first pick to the Western Bulldogs; and in 2023 Sydney traded the first pick to Geelong in a once-off overage draft.

| Draft | Player | Selected by | Recruited from | League recruited from |
|---|---|---|---|---|
| 2016 | Nicola Barr | Greater Western Sydney | Sydney University | SWAFL |
| 2017 | Isabel Huntington | Western Bulldogs | Melbourne University | VFL Women's |
| 2018 | Nina Morrison | Geelong | Geelong Falcons | TAC Cup Girls |
| 2019 | Gabby Newton | Western Bulldogs | Northern Knights | NAB League Girls |
| 2020 | Ellie McKenzie | Richmond | Northern Knights | NAB League Girls |
| 2021 | Charlie Rowbottom | Gold Coast | Oakleigh Chargers | NAB League Girls |
| 2022 | Montana Ham | Sydney | Western Jets | NAB League Girls |
| 2023 sup. (Note: This was a once-off overage national draft in which only players aged over 19 were eligible to be drafted.) | Erin Hoare | Geelong | Geelong | VFL Women's |
| 2023 | Kristie-Lee Weston-Turner | Western Bulldogs | Western Jets | Talent League Girls |
| 2024 | Ash Centra | Collingwood | Gippsland Power | Talent League Girls |
| 2025 | Olivia Wolmarans | Richmond | Subiaco | WAFL Women's |

== Rookie draft ==
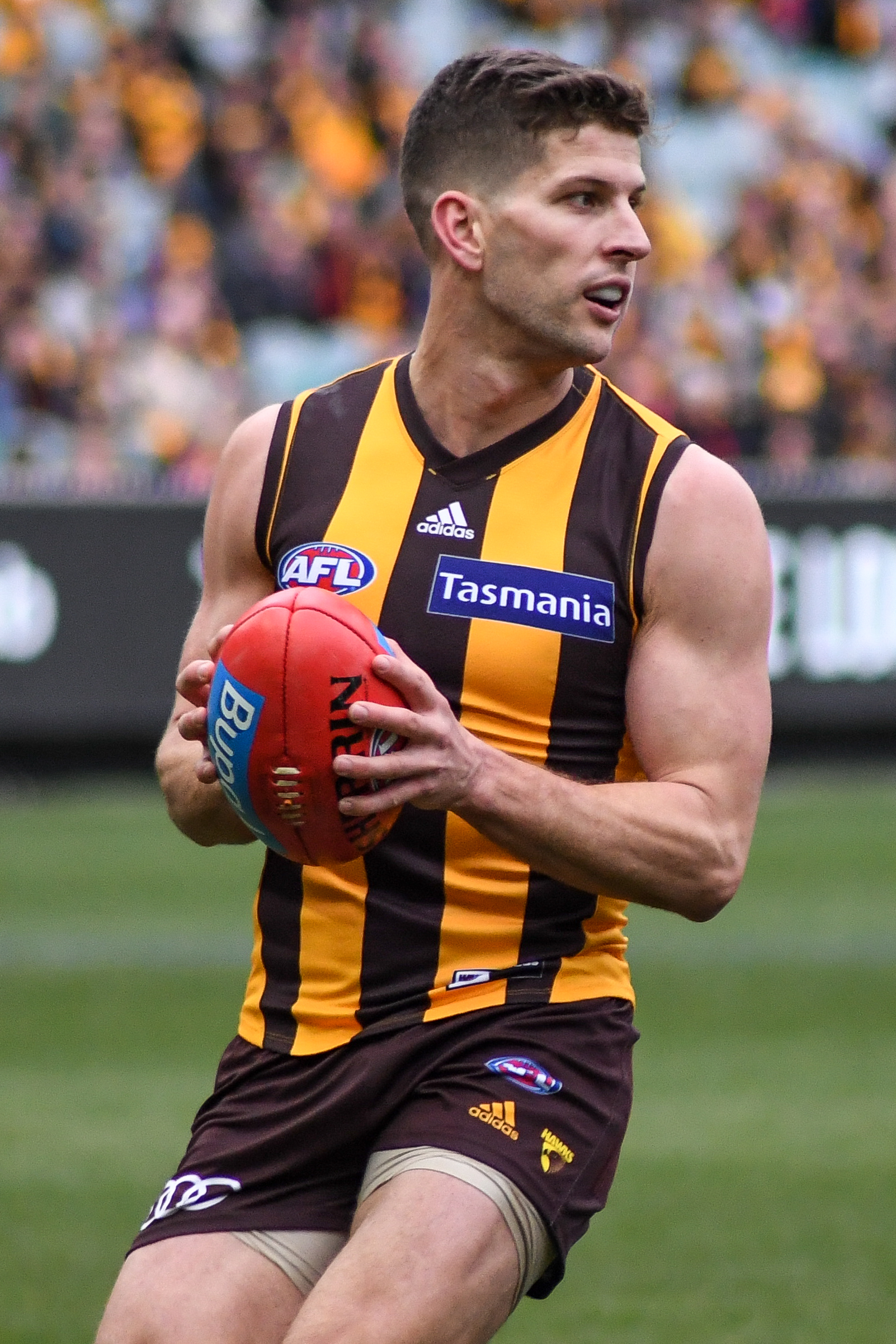
Luke Breust holds the record for most AFL games played by a player recruited from the rookie draft, with 300 matches and counting.

Held at the same time as the pre-season draft, the rookie draft is a chance for clubs to recruit players for their Rookie list. Rookies are usually picked as young, developing players and can be elevated from the rookie list during the year, if there is a long-term injury or retirement to a senior player in the team. Once the rookie is elevated, he remains that way until the end of the year, where they can be officially upgraded to the senior list, or placed back on the rookie list, or delisted/not offered a new contract. Teams are allowed to have four to six rookies, but the Queensland and NSW teams may have more. The first rookie draft was the 1997 rookie draft (which followed the 1996 AFL draft and is technically lumped in with this draft for recordkeeping purposes).

=== International rookies ===
Rookies are also available to be selected from overseas countries and players on the list do not count towards the salary cap. Notable examples are Irish Tommy Walsh of Sydney; Canadian Mike Pyke of Sydney, a former rugby union international; and Americans Seamus McNamara and Mason Cox, both former college basketball players who were rookie listed by Collingwood.

In 2006, the AFL introduced a new scheme where clubs can maintain two international rookies (excluding Irish players) outside of the regular rookie list.

The rule was adjusted in 2010 to group international rookies with players recruited from other sports, and refers to them as Category B rookies. Up to three can be listed in addition to up to six Category A rookies.

== See also ==
- AFL salary cap
- AFL Women's draft
