= Priority draft pick =

Type of draft selection in the Australian Football League's AFL Draft

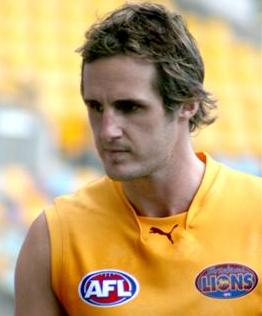
Travis Johnstone, the first pick of the 1997 AFL draft, was drafted via a priority draft pick

The priority draft pick is a type of draft selection in the Australian Football League's AFL draft. Priority draft picks are additional draft picks, located at the beginning or end of the first round, which are given only to the poorest performing teams, to provide additional help for those teams to improve on-field performances in future years. Prior to 2012, a team automatically received a priority draft pick if its win–loss record met pre-defined eligibility criteria; since 2012, priority draft picks will be awarded on a discretionary basis by the AFL commission.

The priority draft pick has been the consistent subject of controversy, as several poor-performing teams have been accused of tanking during the later part of the season to ensure that they qualify for the additional draft pick.

== AFL draft ==
At the conclusion of each AFL season, there are three AFL drafts: the National Draft, the Pre-Season Draft and the Rookie Draft. The National Draft is the most important of the drafts, as it is the primary recruitment method for prospective young players once they reach the age of 18.

In the draft, the selections are arranged into rounds, with each team having one selection per round. Selections in each round are arranged in reverse ladder position order.

== Priority draft pick rules ==
Under current AFL rules, enacted from the 2012 season onwards, a club can receive a priority draft pick at the discretion of the AFL Commission.

A formula which will assist with determining whether or not a team receives a priority draft pick, and at which round in the draft that pick will be taken, has been developed that takes into account such factors as:

- premiership points that a club has received over a period of years (with greater weight to recent seasons),
- a club's percentage (points for/points against x 100) over a period of years (another indication of on-field competitiveness, with greater weight to recent seasons),
- any finals appearances that a club has made in recent seasons,
- any premierships that a club has won in recent seasons, and
- a club's injury rates in each relevant season.

In 2016, the Brisbane Lions became the first club to be awarded a priority draft pick under the current rules. However, through a series of trades in that year's AFL draft, the Sydney Swans, who had finished as minor premiers in the season that had just passed and reached the Grand Final, ended up with it instead. The Swans used this pick to draft Will Hayward.

In 2025, wooden spooners West Coast received a priority draft pick, after winning only one game in the recently concluded season, which they traded to the Brisbane Lions, which had just won its second consecutive premiership.

== Priority round history ==
The draft was established in 1986 in an attempt to reduce the inherent inequities of the league under zoning, where the clubs with the most successful zones, such as Carlton, Collingwood and Essendon, were able to perennially dominate the competition, while teams with weaker zones, such as St Kilda, Sydney and Footscray, were perennially close to or at the bottom of the ladder. The draft was intended to give the weakest teams access to the best prospective players.

=== First priority round amendment ===
By 1992, some of the weakest teams (e.g. Sydney Swans, Brisbane Bears and Richmond) were still enduring prolonged periods of poor performance, so the priority draft pick was introduced in the Draft of that year to further assist these teams.

In its original version:

- Teams received a priority draft pick if they finished with less than 20.5 premiership points (five wins) for the season.
- The entire priority round took place prior to the first round of the National Draft.
- Where more than one team participated in the same round of priority picks, selections were made in reverse ladder position order, as is the case for normal selection rounds.

It became clear, however, that a team with reasonable prospects could finish with five wins and receive a roster boosting priority draft pick as a result of an isolated poor season due to key players suffering injuries, internal dissent and/or other off-field trouble.

This situation was both unfair and counterproductive to the raison d'être of the priority pick, which was to assist consistently poor teams with minimal or no prospects to rebuild: as such, AFL made further amendments to the priority pick rules in 2006.

=== 2006 priority round amendment ===
From the 2006 draft, a club became eligible for a priority draft pick in the National Draft if it finished a season with fewer than 16.5 premiership points (four wins).

The location of the priority draft picks within the overall National Draft now depended upon the team's performance over the previous two years:

- Where the team finished with more than 16.5 premiership points in the previous season, and fewer than 16.5 premiership points in the current season, the priority draft pick was taken between the first and second rounds of the National Draft.
- Where the team finished with fewer than 16.5 premiership points in both seasons, the priority draft pick was taken prior to the first round of the National Draft.

Another way to describe this is that in a sequence of consecutive poor seasons, the priority draft pick in the first season would be taken after the first round, and any second or subsequent priority draft picks would be taken before the first round.

=== 2012 priority pick reform ===
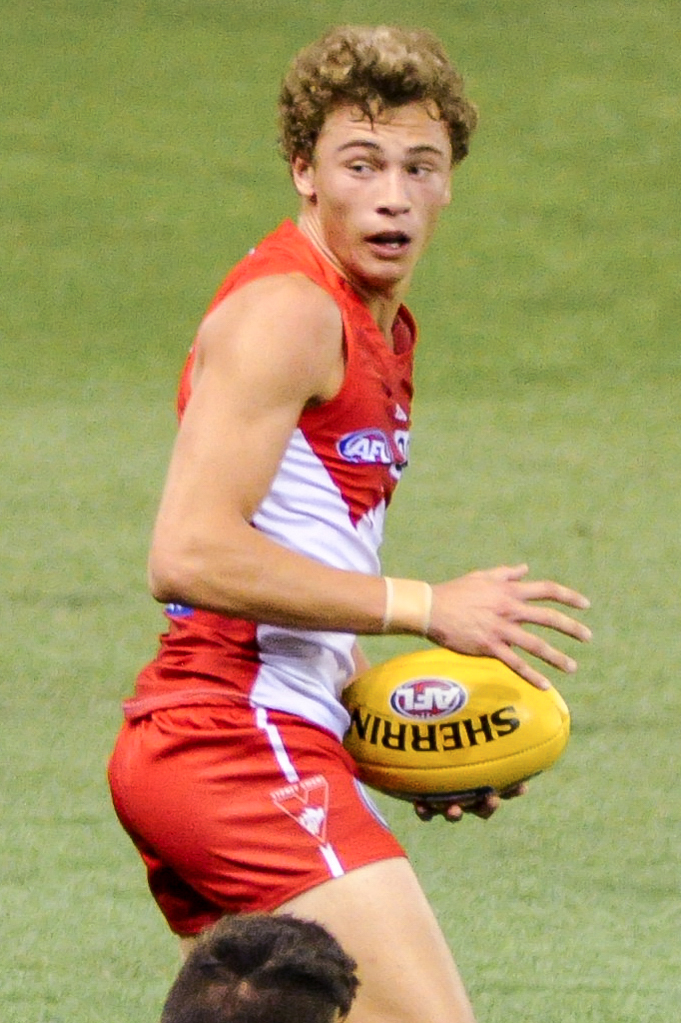
Will Hayward was selected as a priority draft pick by the Sydney Swans in the 2016 draft, despite the club having just played in a Grand Final weeks earlier.

Despite the best efforts of the AFL, the priority draft pick became controversial in the late 2000s and early 2010s because of the potential for corruption, since it could be automatically awarded based on the performance of the club over the past two seasons with a defined cut-off point (16.5 premiership points or four wins).

In the 2012 pre-season, the AFL Commission, with the unanimous support of the 18 clubs, removed all provision for priority picks automatically based upon finishing results, with the Commission retaining the power to award priority picks on a discretionary basis.

To allow for this situation, a formula was developed that takes into account such factors as:

- premiership points that a club has received over a period of years (with greater weight to recent seasons),
- a club's percentage (points for/points against x 100) over a period of years (another indication of on-field competitiveness, with greater weight to recent seasons),
- any finals appearances that a club has made in recent seasons,
- any premierships that a club has won in recent seasons, and
- a club's injury rates in each relevant season.

To eliminate any perception of tanking, the formula for priority picks is kept confidential by the AFL Commission.

In 2016, the Brisbane Lions became the first club to be given a priority draft pick under the current rules, with that pick located after the first round (although Sydney ended up with the pick after the trade period).

== Players selected with start of first round or first assistance priority picks ==
Year	Pick	Player	Club	Ladder Position
1992	1	Drew Banfield	West Coast, pick traded from Sydney	Sydney finished 15th with 3 wins/WCE won 1992 Premiership
1992	2	Nathan Chapman	Brisbane Bears	Brisbane finished 14th with 4 wins
1992	3	Michael Prior	Essendon, pick traded from Sydney	Sydney finished 15th with 3 wins/Essendon finished 8th with 12 wins
1992	4	Justin Leppitsch	Brisbane Bears	Brisbane finished 14th with 4 wins
1993	1	Darren Gaspar	Sydney	Sydney finished 15th with 1 win
1993	2	Nigel Lappin	Brisbane Bears	Brisbane finished 13th on % with 4 wins
1993	3	Justin Murphy	Richmond	Richmond finished 14th with 4 wins
1993	4	Glenn Gorman	Sydney	Sydney finished 15th with 1 win
1994	2	Anthony Rocca	Sydney	Sydney finished 15th with 4 wins
1994	3	Shannon Grant	Sydney	Sydney finished 15th with 4 wins
1995	2	Matthew Primus	Fitzroy	Fitzroy finished 16th with 2 wins
1997	1	Travis Johnstone	Melbourne	Melbourne finished 16th with 4 wins
1999	1	Josh Fraser	Collingwood	Collingwood finished 16th with 4 wins
1999	2	Paul Hasleby	Fremantle	Fremantle finished 15th with 5 wins
2000	1	Nick Riewoldt	St Kilda	St Kilda finished 16th with 1 win
2001	1	Luke Hodge	Hawthorn, pick traded from Fremantle	Fremantle finished 16th with 2 wins/Hawthorn finished 6th with 13 wins
2001	2	Luke Ball	St Kilda	St Kilda finished 15th with 2 wins
2001	3	Chris Judd	West Coast	West Coast finished 14th with 5 wins
2002	N/A	N/A	Carlton	Carlton finished 16th with 3 wins/Carlton stripped of priority pick
2003	1	Adam Cooney	Western Bulldogs	Western Bulldogs finished 16th with 1 win
2003	2	Andrew Walker	Carlton	Carlton finished 15th with 4 wins
2003	3	Colin Sylvia	Melbourne	Melbourne finished 14th with 5 wins
2004	1	Brett Deledio	Richmond	Richmond finished 16th with 4 wins
2004	2	Jarryd Roughead	Hawthorn	Hawthorn finished 15th with 4 wins
2004	3	Ryan Griffen	Western Bulldogs	Western Bulldogs finished 14th with 5 wins
2005	1	Marc Murphy	Carlton	Carlton finished 16th with 4 wins
2005	2	Dale Thomas	Collingwood	Collingwood finished 15th with 5 wins
2005	3	Xavier Ellis	Hawthorn	Hawthorn finished 14th with 5 wins
2006				Priority Pick Rule Adjustment
2006	17	Shaun Hampson	Carlton	Carlton finished 16th with 3 wins
2006	18	Leroy Jetta	Essendon	Essendon finished 15th with 3 wins on %
2007	1	Matthew Kreuzer	Carlton	Carlton finished 15th with 4 wins
2007	18	Alex Rance	Richmond	Richmond finished 16th with 3 wins
2008	17	Sam Blease	Melbourne	Melbourne finished 16th win 3 wins
2008	18	Luke Shuey	West Coast	West Coast finished 16th with 4 wins
2009	1	Tom Scully	Melbourne	
2010				Gold Coast enters the competition with draft concessions
2010	26	Jack Darling	West Coast	West Coast finished 16th with 4 wins
2011				Greater Western Sydney enters the competition with draft concessions
2011	27	Sam Kerridge	Adelaide, pick traded from Gold Coast	Gold Coast finished 17th with 3 wins/ Adelaide finished 14th with 7 wins
2011	28	Fraser McInnes	West Coast, pick traded from Port Adelaide	Port Adelaide finished 16th with 3 wins on % / West Coast finished 4th with 17 wins
2011	29	Alex Forster	Fremantle, pick traded from Brisbane Lions	Brisbane finished 15th with 4 wins / Fremantle finished 11th with 9 wins
2012				Priority Pick Rule Adjustment
2016	21	Will Hayward	Sydney, pick traded from Brisbane Lions	Brisbane Lions finished 17th with 3 wins / Sydney finished 1st with 17 wins on %
2019				Gold Coast assistance package - 2019 #1, #20; 2020 Mid 1st Round + Pre Draft Selections, 2021 first pick in 2nd round.
2019	1	Matthew Rowell	Gold Coast	Gold Coast finished 18th with 3 wins. Rowell won the 2025 Brownlow Medal.
2019	22	Deven Robertson	Brisbane Lions, pick traded from Gold Coast	Gold Coast finished 18th with 3 wins. / Brisbane Lions finished 2nd with 16 wins.on %
2020	15	Connor Stone	Greater Western Sydney, pick traded of Gold Coast pick from Geelong	Gold Coast finished 14th with 5 wins / GWS finished 10th with 8 wins.
2021	21	Matthew Johnson	Fremantle, pick traded from Gold Coast	Gold Coast finished 16th with 7 wins / Fremantle finished 11th with 10 wins
2023				North Melbourne assistance package - 2023 End of 1st Round Pick, 2x 2024 End of 1st Round Picks.
2023	29	Ashton Moir	Carlton, pick traded from North Melbourne	North Melbourne finished 17th with 3 wins / Carlton finished 5th with 13 wins
2024	26	Ned Bowman	Sydney, pick traded from North Melbourne	North Melbourne finished 17th with 3 wins / Sydney finished 1st with 17 wins
2024	27	Matt Whitlock	North Melbourne	North Melbourne finished 17th with 3 wins

== Tanking ==
There was annual speculation that poorly performing teams manipulated their results after they were eliminated from finals contention in order to ensure they remained below the eligibility criterion and received a priority pick under the 1993-2011 format; this was referred to as "tanking."

There are a wide variety of behaviours which could be considered to be tanking. These include:

- Instructing the players to deliberately lose matches
- Employing unusual tactics in matches, including using players in positions where they do not usually play
- Resting star players with minor injuries, who would likely not be rested if the team were contesting finals
- Playing younger players who do not yet have much experience at AFL level

While all of these behaviours can be interpreted as an attempt to avoid winning matches, all but the first point can also be justified as a sensible player management and development strategy for a team with no chance of playing finals, which complicates the debate about tanking. Another sign cited as evidence of tanking is the practice of fans openly supporting their clubs' opponents on game day; however, this can also be justified as a sign of fan dissatisfaction at the club's poor performance and/or its administration.

Also complicating the debate is the fact that different people have different opinions on what is acceptable behaviour. When speaking about West Coast's 2010 priority draft pick, coach John Worsfold openly defended his right to play young players in unfamiliar positions to assist their development; but, when speaking about Carlton's 2007 priority draft pick, assistant coach Tony Liberatore said he personally thought it was wrong to play younger players in place of senior players whose niggling injuries would not be bad enough to force their omission if the team were playing finals, and Brock McLean revealed that he requested to be traded away from the Melbourne Football Club because he disagreed with similar strategies in the lead-up to Melbourne's 2009 priority draft pick.

The legal implications of tanking on sports betting is also a significant problem, and in 2009 a betting agency temporarily suspended betting on the wooden spoon when it became concerned about the potential legal ramifications if tanking or other corruption were ever proven. The penalty for any player or club official found to have been involved in tanking is a possible lifetime suspension and/or a fine of up to $100,000 for each offence.

By shifting the Priority Round from before to after the First Round in 2006, the AFL reduced the incentive to tank, but did not eliminate it; the incentive was reduced further with the 2012 reform. The AFL has the endorsement of the Victorian Commission for Gambling Regulation that the integrity of the game is sufficiently protected under the priority system.

Some members of the media, particularly from the Herald Sun, had previously called for the priority draft pick to be scrapped, with some journalists calling for a draft lottery to be applied in the first round for the bottom five or six clubs.

When asked in 2011, the AFL Players Association's official position was that it would like to see the priority pick abolished due to the perception of tanking and its impact on the public's confidence in the game, rather than any suggestion of actual corruption.

=== Statements alluding to tanking ===
In 2011, sacked Melbourne coach Dean Bailey stated that he coached to "ensure the club was well placed for draft picks" in 2008 and 2009, and admitted to playing players in unusual positions, but he never claimed that the team had deliberately lost matches. Tony Liberatore made similar statements in 2008, when he claimed that he felt like "winning wasn't the be all and end all" when Carlton received a priority pick in 2007, but he also said that he'd never seen anything to suggest that players were deliberately losing matches. In both cases, the statements were seen as an admission of guilt to tanking by some, but in the absence of an explicit directive to deliberately lose, acceptable by others, and the AFL was satisfied that neither team had broken its tanking rules.

=== Notable matches in the tanking debate ===
Round 22, 2007 – Melbourne vs Carlton

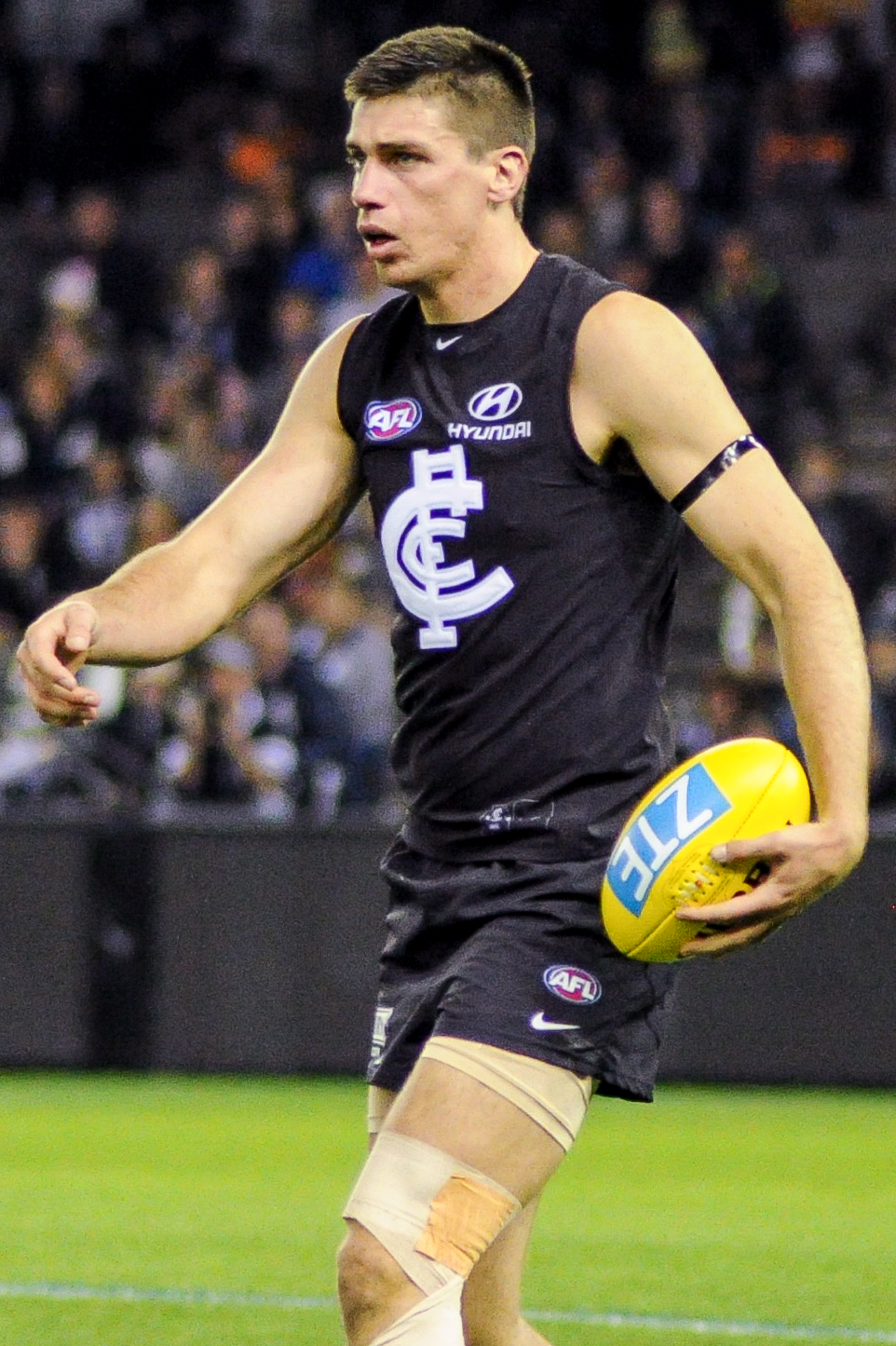
The match between Melbourne and Carlton in Round 22 of 2007 was dubbed the Kreuzer Cup, as a Carlton loss would have seen them earn the first pick of the 2007 AFL draft, which was expected to be used on Matthew Kreuzer, who was playing as a ruckman and key forward for the Northern Knights

The Round 22, 2007 match between Melbourne and Carlton, nicknamed the Kreuzer Cup, was the most controversial match in the tanking debate. It was the last match of the regular season, and both Melbourne and Carlton had a record of 4–17, meaning that whichever team won the match would lose the chance at a priority draft pick, and both clubs had already avoided the ignominy of the wooden spoon, as Richmond had secured it with a final record of 3–18–1. Overall, this meant that there was no benefit for either club to win, but a significant benefit to losing.

The stakes were particularly high in Carlton's case, because the club had also received a priority pick in the 2006 season; as such, if it lost this match, it would receive the No. 1 draft pick as its priority pick. In Melbourne's case, the priority pick it could have received would be the No. 18 pick; the No. 1 pick would go to wooden spooners Richmond if Melbourne lost the match. The match became known as the Kreuzer Cup, named after Northern Knights' ruckman Matthew Kreuzer, who had been expected to be (and was eventually, by Carlton) selected with the No. 1 pick in the 2007 AFL draft.

The match was high scoring, played with low intensity, poor skills and very little defensive pressure, and two players (Carlton's Heath Scotland and Melbourne's Travis Johnstone) gathered more than 40 disposals. Melbourne had a five-goal lead by quarter time, and ended up winning the match 21.13 (139) to 15.18 (108). Carlton went on to recruit Kreuzer with the No. 1 pick in the draft.

Round 18, 2009 – Melbourne vs Richmond

Melbourne entered the match with a record of 3–14. Because it had received a priority draft pick in 2008, it had the potential to receive a priority draft pick at the start of the draft if won no more than one of its final five matches.

The match was close for much of the game, but Melbourne kicked away to lead by a few goals in the final quarter. Richmond was then able to make a comeback, and an after-the-siren goal by Jordan McMahon gave Richmond a four-point win. The Herald Sun later accused Melbourne coach Dean Bailey of making positional changes in the final quarter which were so nonsensical that they could only have been designed to ensure Richmond would make a comeback: this included moving key defenders James Frawley and Matthew Warnock into the forward-line, resting key midfielders, and using Brad Miller as a ruckman.

In late 2012 and early 2013, Melbourne was thoroughly investigated for its conduct in this and other games which occurred in late 2009. The club was found not guilty of tanking, but were found guilty of bringing the game into disrepute and fined $500,000, with Bailey (who was fired as coach in 2011) being suspended for 16 matches and football operations manager Chris Connelly being suspended for 12 months (22 matches).

== See also ==
- Melbourne Football Club tanking scandal
