= 1983 Australian Football Championships =

State football championships (1983)

Tournament information
- Sport: Australian football
- Location: Adelaide and Perth, Australia
- Dates: 16 May 1983–12 July 1911
- Format: Round Robin
- Teams: 3

Final champion
- Western Australia

The 1983 Australian Football Championships was an Australian football series between representative teams of the three major football states. Games involving Victoria were played under State of Origin rules, whilst the match between Western Australia and South Australia involved players based in their respective states at the time. The competition was won by Western Australia.

== Results ==
=== Game 1 ===
Home team	Home team score	Away team	Away team score	Ground	Crowd	Date	Time	Broadcast Network
South Australia	26.16 (172)	Victoria	17.14 (116)	Football Park	42,521	16 May 1983		Seven

- Fos Williams Medal: Michael Aish (South Australia)

=== Game 2 ===
Home team	Home team score	Away team	Away team score	Ground	Crowd	Date	Time	Broadcast Network
Western Australia	20.14 (134)	South Australia	16.14 (110)	Subiaco Oval		4 June 1983		Seven

- Simpson Medal: Stephen Michael (Western Australia)
- Fos Williams Medal: Craig Williams (South Australia)

=== Game 3 ===
Home team	Home team score	Away team	Away team score	Ground	Crowd	Date	Time	Broadcast Network
Western Australia	16.22 (118)	Victoria	16.19 (115)	Subiaco Oval	44,213	12 July 1983		Seven

- Simpson Medal: Maurice Rioli (Western Australia)
- Tassie Medal: Stephen Michael (Western Australia)

== Standings ==
1983 Australian Championship
Pos	Team	Pld	W	L	D	PF	PA	PP	Pts
1	Western Australia	2	2	0	0	252	225	112.0	4
2	South Australia	2	1	1	0	282	250	112.8	2
3	Victoria	2	0	2	0	231	290	79.7	0

== All-Australian Team ==
Following completion of the series, the best players over the three games were selected in the All-Australian team.

1983 All-Australian team
B:	Stephen Curtis (SA)	Craig Williams (SA)	Stephen McCann (Vic)
HB:	Keith Greig (Vic)	Ross Glendinning (WA)	Tony Giles (SA)
C:	Craig Bradley (SA)	Michael Aish (SA)	Robert Flower (Vic)
HF:	Gary Buckenara (WA)	Terry Daniher (Vic)	Peter Motley (SA)
F:	Michael Tuck (Vic)	Simon Madden (Vic)	Kevin Taylor (WA)
Foll:	Matt Rendell (SA)	Stephen Michael (WA) Captain	Maurice Rioli (WA)
Int:	Mark Lee (Vic)	Mike Richardson (WA)	
Coach:	John Todd (WA)		

== Squads ==
Western Australia

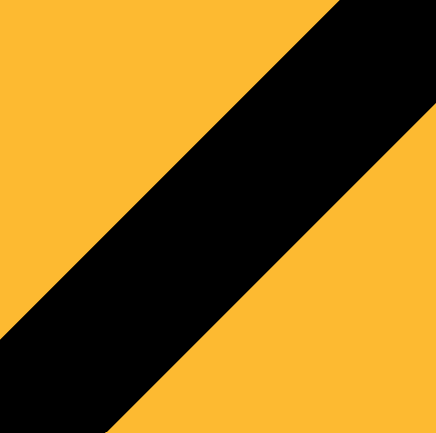

Coach/es: John Todd
Captain/s: Stephen Michael
Vice Captain/s:
Deputy Captain/s:
vs South Australia and Victoria

- Stephen Michael (South Fremantle)
- Wayne Blackwell (Claremont)
- Phil Cronan (West Perth)
- Paul Harding (East Fremantle)
- Don Langsford (Swan Districts)
- Warren Ralph (Claremont)
- Murray Rance (Swan Districts)
- Tony Solin (Swan Districts)

vs South Australia

- Michael Aitken (Claremont)
- Craig Edwards (East Perth)
- Shane Ellis (East Fremantle)
- Les Fong (West Perth)
- Steve Goulding (Claremont)
- Ray Holden (West Perth)
- John Ironmonger (East Perth)
- Stan Magro (East Perth)
- Michael Mitchell (Claremont)
- Phil Narkle (Swan Districts)
- Darrell Panizza (Claremont)
- Willie Roe (South Fremantle)
- Peter Thorne (East Perth)

vs Victoria

- Rod Barrett (South Fremantle)
- Ron Boucher (Swan Districts)
- Peter Bosustow (Perth)
- Gary Buckenara (Subiaco)
- Tony Buhagiar (Essendon)
- Ross Glendinning (North Melbourne)
- Gary Malarkey (Geelong)
- Andrew Purser (Footscray)
- Mike Richardson (Collingwood)
- Maurice Rioli (Richmond)
- Garry Sidebottom (Fitzroy)
- Kevin Taylor (East Fremantle)
South Australia

Coach: Bob Hammond
Captain/s: Russell Ebert
Vice Captain/s:
Deputy Captain/s:
vs Victoria and Western Australia

- Russell Ebert (Port Adelaide)
- Michael Aish (Norwood)
- Craig Bradley (Port Adelaide)
- Tony Giles (Port Adelaide)
- Stephen Kernahan (Glenelg)
- Bruce Lindner (West Adelaide)
- Greg McAdam (North Adelaide)
- Garry McIntosh (Norwood)
- Peter Motley (Sturt)
- John Riley (North Adelaide)
- Daryl Schimmelbusch (West Torrens)
- John Schneebichler (South Adelaide)
- Keith Thomas (Norwood)
- Craig Williams (West Adelaide)

vs Victoria

- Stephen Copping (Essendon)
- Neil Craig (Sturt)
- Mark Naley (South Adelaide)
- Greg Phillips (Port Adelaide)
- John Platten (Central District)
- Matt Rendell (West Torrens)
- Greg Whittlesea (Sturt)

vs Western Australia

- Andrew Aish (Norwood)
- Stephen Curtis (Port Adelaide)
- Rick Davies (Sturt)
- Danny Jenkins (Norwood)
- Tony McGuinness (Glenelg)
- Frank Spiel (Sturt)

Did not play

- Bruce Abernethy (North Melbourne)
Victoria

Coach: David Parkin
Captain/s: Robert Flower
Vice Captain/s: Terry Daniher
Deputy Captain/s:
vs South Australia and Western Australia

- Robert Flower (Melbourne)
- Terry Daniher (Sydney)
- Geoff Cunningham (St Kilda)
- Steven Icke (Melbourne)
- Simon Madden (Essendon)
- Stephen McCann (North Melbourne)

vs South Australia

- Rod Ashman (Carlton)
- Neil Clarke (Essendon)
- Neil Cordy (Footscray)
- Jim Edmond (Footscray)
- Robert Elphinstone (St Kilda)
- Glenn Hawker (Essendon)
- Grant Lawrie (Fitzroy)
- Alex Marcou (Carlton)
- Peter McConville (Carlton)
- John Mossop (Geelong)
- Barry Rowlings (Richmond)
- Laurie Serafini (Fitzroy)
- Ken Sheldon (Carlton)
- Greg Smith (Sydney)
- Brian Wilson (Melbourne)
- Mark Yeates (Geelong)

vs Western Australia

- Mark Browning (Sydney)
- Jim Buckley (Carlton)
- Michael Conlan (Fitzroy)
- David Dench (North Melbourne)
- Des English (Carlton)
- Russell Greene (Hawthorn)
- Keith Greig (North Melbourne)
- Wayne Johnston (Carlton)
- Peter Knights (Hawthorn)
- Mark Lee (Richmond)
- Geoff Raines (Collingwood)
- Brian Royal (Footscray)
- Michael Tuck (Hawthorn)
- Terry Wallace (Hawthorn)
- Tim Watson (Essendon)
- Dale Weightman (Richmond)

Did not play

- Greg Burns (St Kilda)
- Peter Daicos (Collingwood)
- Gary Dempsey (North Melbourne)
- Bernie Quinlan (Fitzroy)
- Les Parish (Fitzroy)
- David Rhys-Jones (Sydney)
- Wayne Schimmelbusch (North Melbourne)
