= Emma Quayle =

Australian rules football recruiter with Australian Football League

Emma Quayle is an Australian rules football recruiter with Australian Football League (AFL) club the Greater Western Sydney Giants. She was previously a journalist at The Age newspaper in Melbourne, Australia.

Joining as a cadet in 1999, she covered sport from 2001 to 2017, specialising in Australian rules football and in particular the under-18 system and national draft. Quayle won several AFL Media Association awards for her news and feature writing, and in 2017 won a Quill award for best feature writing for her article on Essendon footballer Anthony McDonald-Tipungwuti. She was the first person to win three Grant Hattam awards, awarded by the AFL Players Association for the best football journalism. Quayle's first book, The Draft: inside the AFL's search for talent, which followed the junior careers of Trent Cotchin, Ben McEvoy, Brad Ebert, Cyril Rioli and Patrick Veszpremi in the lead-up to the 2007 AFL draft, was published by Allen & Unwin in September 2008. A follow-up, The Draftees, featuring Isaac Heeney, Jake Lever, Peter Wright, Tom Lamb and Clem Smith, was published by Penguin in 2015. Quayle is also the author of Nine Lives, the story of former Essendon wingman Adam Ramanauskas' battle with cancer.

In 2017, Quayle became the first female recruiter in the AFL when she joined the Greater Western Sydney Giants.
