= Veszpremi =

Veszpremi may refer to:

- Patrick Veszpremi (born 1989), Australian rules footballer
- FC Veszprém, Hungarian football club
