= Richard Cousins (footballer) =

Australian rules footballer

Personal information
- Full name: Richard Cousins
- Born: 13 July 1962 (age 64); South Australia
- Original teams: Spalding, Rostrevor College
- Draft: No. 9, 1982 interstate draft
- Height: 196 cm (6 ft 5 in)
- Weight: 100 kg (220 lb)

Playing career^{1}
Years	Club	Games (Goals)
1987–1991	Footscray	60 (21)
1982-1986	Central District (SANFL)	94 (72)
- ^{1} Playing statistics correct to the end of 1991.

Richard Cousins (born 13 July 1962) is a former Australian rules footballer who played with Footscray in the Victorian/Australian Football League (VFL/AFL).

Cousins started his career at Central District and won their best and fairest award in 1986. At the end of the year, in the 1986 National Draft, Cousins was selected at pick six by VFL club Footscray and made the move to Victoria. He made 20 appearances in 1987, his first season, mostly as a centre half-forward. In 1988, with Andrew Purser no longer at the club having returned to Western Australia, Cousins was Footscray's first ruckman and he had the best season of his career, with eight Brownlow Medal votes. He took 109 marks that year, second only at Footscray to Peter Foster. In 1989 he played another 17 games, then didn't feature at all in the 1990 season, which was followed by a three games season in 1991.

As a Junior he played football for Spalding in the North Eastern Football League that encompasses the Clare Valley. His family owned a farm in the Spalding District. His Cousin Terry was a promising cricketer playing in the SACA A Grade District Cricket Competition for Salisbury.
