= Brett Meredith =

Australian rules footballer

Personal information
- Full name: Brett Meredith
- Born: 20 January 1989 (age 37)
- Original team: Northern Knights (TAC Cup) Mill Park Football Club
- Draft: No. 26, 2007 National Draft, Sydney
- Height: 181 cm (5 ft 11 in)
- Weight: 81 kg (179 lb)
- Position: Midfielder

Playing career^{1}
Years	Club	Games (Goals)
2008–2012	Sydney	16 (10)
- ^{1} Playing statistics correct to the end of 2012.

Brett Meredith (born 20 January 1989) is an Australian rules footballer. He played for the Sydney Swans in the Australian Football League (AFL) for five seasons.

In 2009, Meredith made his debut for the Swans and looked to be quite a skilful and impressive young midfielder. Injuries brought his season to an early close however. In 2010, Meredith showed improvement in his game playing across the half forward flank when playing in the seniors.

He was delisted by the Swans at the end of the 2012 season.

In 2013, Meredith signed up to play with the Werribee Tigers in the Victorian Football League (VFL) along with former Sydney player Jarred Moore. Werribee lost to the Box Hill Hawks in the 2013 VFL Preliminary final with Brett been named in the best players in the final.
