= Bill Lokan =

Australian rules footballer

Personal information
- Born: 1 October 1959 (age 67)
- Original team: Walkerville
- Draft: No. 7, 1982 interstate draft
- Height: 183 cm (6 ft 0 in)
- Weight: 78 kg (172 lb)

Playing career^{1}
Years	Club	Games (Goals)
1979–1982	North Adelaide	51 (47)
1983–1988	Fitzroy	87 (40)
- ^{1} Playing statistics correct to the end of 1988.

Bill Lokan (born 1 October 1959) is a former Australian rules footballer who played with North Adelaide in the South Australian National Football League (SANFL) and Fitzroy in the Victorian Football League (VFL).

Lokan, who played his junior football in Walkerville, won a reserves best and fairest at North Adelaide in 1978, despite playing only 13 games. In 1979 he was promoted to the seniors, where he remained for four seasons. He made a total of 51 league appearances for North Adelaide.

A centreman, Lokan joined Fitzroy in 1983 and played 87 games for the club in six seasons, including five finals. Lokan, now resides in the Clare Valley as a school teacher for year seven at St Joseph's Primary.
