= Darren Pfeiffer =

Australian rules footballer (born 1987)

Personal information
- Full name: Darren Pfeiffer
- Born: 28 September 1987 (age 39)
- Original team: Norwood (SANFL)
- Height: 184 cm (6 ft 0 in)
- Weight: 84 kg (185 lb)

Playing career^{1}
Years	Club	Games (Goals)
2008	Carlton	7 (4)
2012–2013	Port Adelaide	16 (2)
Total		23 (6)
- ^{1} Playing statistics correct to the end of 2013.

Darren Pfeiffer (born 28 September 1987) is a former professional Australian rules footballer who played for the Carlton Football Club and Port Adelaide Football Club in the Australian Football League (AFL).

Pfeiffer played early football for Norwood in the South Australian National Football League (SANFL) under 19s, before being drafted by the Adelaide Football Club in the 2005 AFL National Draft with its first round selection (No. 17 overall). After suffering injury setbacks and, by his own admission, a lack of application, he was delisted at the end of 2007 without playing a senior game.

Pfeiffer nominated in the 2008 Pre-Season Draft, and was selected by Carlton with its selection (No. 2 overall), and made his AFL debut in round 2 of the 2008 season. Pfeiffer was a late inclusion into the Carlton team for round 9 against Fremantle at the Telstra Dome. It was Pfeiffer's goal in the dying minutes that sealed a come from behind victory for Carlton. He was moved to the rookie list in 2009 (being delisted then redrafted with the No. 51 overall pick in the 2009 Rookie Draft), but experienced an injury interrupted 2009 season.

He underwent a shoulder reconstruction earlier in the year and registering only his first senior game for Carlton's VFL-affiliate, the Northern Bullants, in round 17 before going on to be a member of their losing Grand Final side. He could not gain selection for Carlton during 2009 and was delisted again at the end of the season, requiring a second shoulder operation.

Pfeiffer moved to Queensland in 2010, spending a one-season stint at Southport in the Queensland Australian Football League (QAFL), where he finished second in the Grogan Medal. He returned to his former SANFL team, Norwood, in 2011, and was recruited to AFL team Port Adelaide as a rookie for the 2012 season. Pfeiffer played sixteen games for Port Adelaide in 2012, but further injuries hampered his 2013 season, and he was delisted at the end of the year, having undergone a total of four shoulder reconstructions in his AFL career. He won an SANFL premiership with Norwood in 2013, where he still played while on reserve for Port Adelaide.

In 2014, Pfeiffer moved back to Queensland to study at university, and signed with the Redland Football Club in the North East Australian Football League (NEAFL). In October 2014, Pfeiffer accepted a one-year contract for season 2015 as senior coach of the University of Queensland Australian Football Club QAFL side. He is currently residing in Sydney, and is the Coach Education Manager for AFL Sydney.
