= Carl Herbert =

Australian rules footballer

Personal information
- Full name: Carl Bryce Herbert
- Born: 28 May 1964 (age 62)
- Original team: Mayne (QAFL)
- Draft: No. 15, 1982 interstate draft
- Height: 170 cm (5 ft 7 in)
- Weight: 67 kg (148 lb)

Playing career^{1}
Years	Club	Games (Goals)
1983	Collingwood	3 (0)
- ^{1} Playing statistics correct to the end of 1983.

Carl Bryce Herbert (born 28 May 1964) is a former Australian rules footballer who played with Collingwood in the Victorian Football League (VFL).

Herbert, who was a Queensland interstate representative at the age of 18, came to Collingwood from Mayne in the 1982 draft. He made three appearances in the 1983 VFL season, the first in round nine, against the Sydney Swans. The following week he had 17 disposals in a loss to Fitzroy, then lost his place in the team with a groin injury. He returned in round 22 to play St Kilda at Victoria Park, which would be his final game.

Back at Mayne, after a stint with West Adelaide, Herbert won three consecutive club best and fairest awards, from 1992 to 1994. He was also Mayne captain in each of those years, as well as the 1995 season.

Aspley's senior best and fairest award is named after Herbert, who had been an Aspley junior.
