= Lewis Stevenson (Australian footballer) =

Australian rules footballer (born 1989)

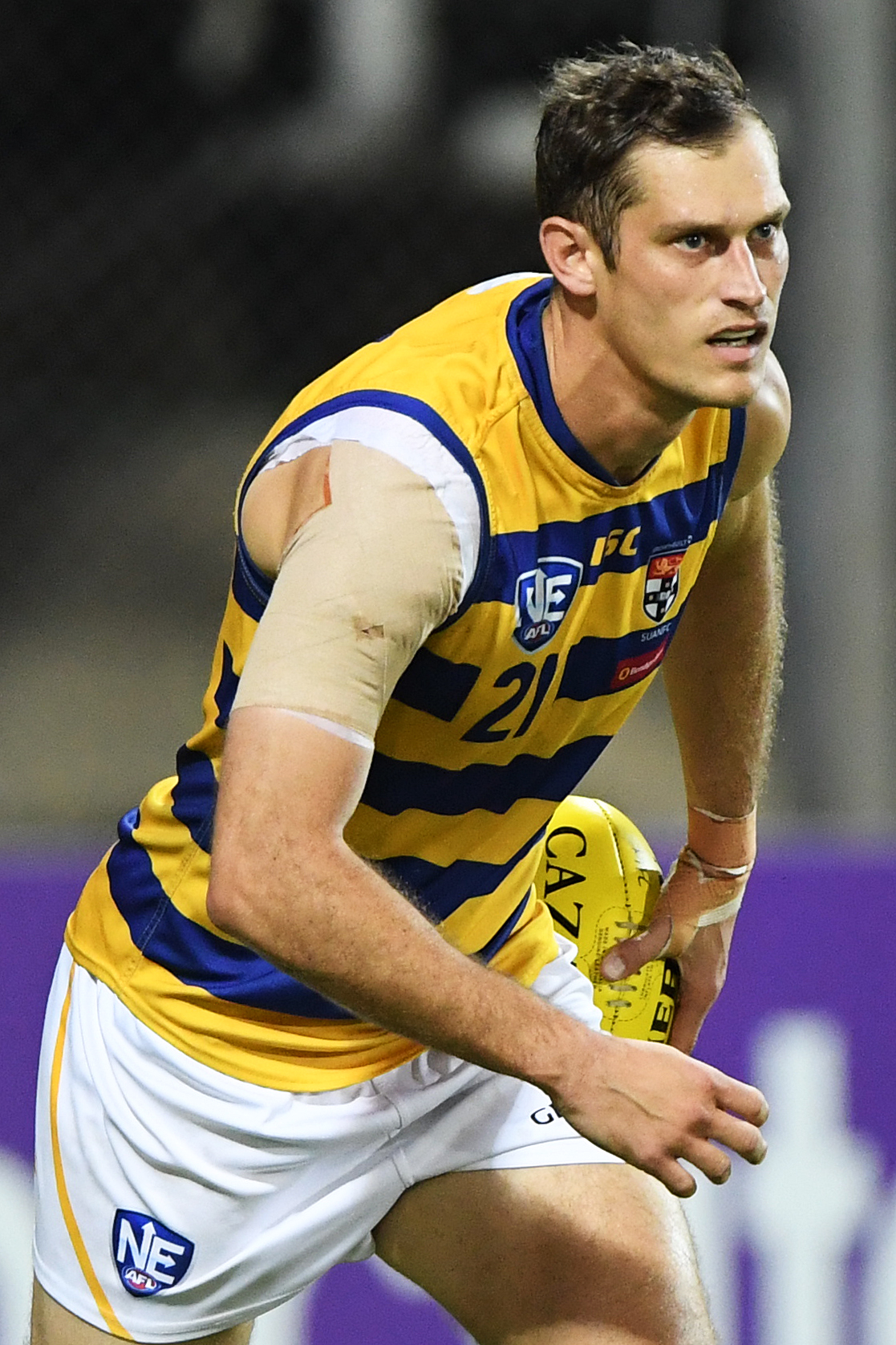
- Stevenson in August 2019

Personal information
- Full name: Lewis Stevenson
- Born: 30 July 1989 (age 37); Perth
- Original team: West Coast JFC
- Height: 189 cm (6 ft 2 in)
- Weight: 88 kg (194 lb)
- Position: Defender

Playing career^{1}
| Years | Club | Games (Goals) |
| 2008–2012 | West Coast | 10 (2) |
| 2013–2014 | Port Adelaide | 9 (0) |
| Total | | 19 (2) |
- ^{1} Playing statistics correct to the end of 2013.

Career highlights
- Claremont premiership side 2011 & 2012; Norwood premiership side 2013

Lewis Stevenson (born 30 July 1989) is a former professional Australian rules footballer who played for the West Coast Eagles and Port Adelaide Football Club in the Australian Football League (AFL).

== Career ==
=== West Coast and Claremont ===
Stevenson was drafted in the 1st round (12th overall) of the 2008 AFL Rookie Draft by West Coast. He did not play a game in his first two seasons on the roster, but was retained for a third year, following a change in the rookie list rules to allow this.

He played 10 senior WAFL games for Claremont in 2008 and 20 in 2009.

Stevenson made his AFL debut in round 5, 2010 against Sydney, after being elevated to the senior list. He played 10 games in 2010, but did not manage to play a senior game in 2011 or 2012. He continued to play for Claremont in the WAFL, including in their 2011 and 2012 WAFL premiership winning sides.

=== Port Adelaide and Norwood ===
During the 2012 trade week, Stevenson was traded to Port Adelaide. He made his debut for Port Adelaide in Round 1, 2013 against Melbourne. Whilst not playing for Port Adelaide he played for Norwood in the SANFL, including in their 2013 premiership winning side.

He was delisted at the end of the 2014 season.

=== Post-AFL ===
Stevenson played for Sydney Uni in the 2015 NEAFL season and was named in the competition's Team of the Year.
