= David Grant (Australian rules footballer) =

Australian rules footballer

Personal information
- Born: 7 August 1966 (age 60)
- Original team: City-South (NTFA)
- Draft: No. 14, 1982 interstate draft
- Height: 184 cm (6 ft 0 in)
- Weight: 84 kg (185 lb)

Playing career^{1}
Years	Club	Games (Goals)
1984–1995	St Kilda	191 (75)
1996	Melbourne	7 (0)
Total		198 (75)
- ^{1} Playing statistics correct to the end of 1996.

Career highlights
- 1991 All Australian Team

David Grant (born 7 August 1966) is a former Australian rules footballer who played with St Kilda in the Australian Football League.

Grant was a utility player and in 1991 was named on the half-back flank All-Australian team. Often, Grant was asked to play centre half-back in a struggling St Kilda side during the 1980s, despite standing just over 6 ft (1.8 m). On other occasions, Grant played as an extra forward to great affect. His aerial leap in the marking contest made him stand up against taller opponents and was a favourite of the Moorabbin faithful. Grant finished second in St Kilda's best and fairest in 1989 to Nicky Winmar and played interstate football with Tasmania. Grant was to be a part of a trade deal that would see him and Jayson Daniels sent to Sydney for Barry Mitchell and a fourth-round pick for the 1993 season. Both Grant and Mitchell refused to swap clubs, and Grant stayed a further three years at St Kilda under acrimonious circumstances until he ended his career with Melbourne.
