= Tony Giles =

Australian rules footballer

Personal information
- Full name: Anthony Giles
- Born: 5 September 1955 (age 71)
- Original team: Yorketown (SYPFL)
- Position: Half back flank

Playing career^{1}
Years	Club	Games (Goals)
1975–1984	Port Adelaide	190 (12)
- ^{1} Playing statistics correct to the end of 1984.

Career highlights
- Club: 3x Port Adelaide premiership player (1977, 1979, 1981); Representative: All-Australian team (1983); 7 games for South Australia

Anthony Giles (b. 5 September 1955) is a former Australian rules footballer who played with Port Adelaide in the South Australian National Football League (SANFL) during the late 1970s and early 1980s.

Giles came to Port Adelaide from Southern Yorke Peninsula Football League (SYPFL)'s Yorketown and made his senior SANFL debut in 1975. He was used mostly as a half back flanker, playing in Port's 1977,1979 and 1981 premiership teams. At interstate level Giles was a regular South Australia representative, playing eight games and earning All-Australian selection in 1983.
