= Tim Walsh (footballer) =

Australian rules footballer

Personal information
- Nickname: "Texas T"
- Born: 14 May 1985 (age 41)
- Original teams: Ivanhoe; Northern U18s
- Debut: Round 8, 2005, Western Bulldogs vs. Kangaroos, at Telstra Dome
- Height: 196 cm (6 ft 5 in)
- Weight: 92 kg (203 lb)

Playing career^{1}
Years	Club	Games (Goals)
2005	Western Bulldogs	1 (1)
- ^{1} Playing statistics correct to the end of 2005.

Tim Walsh (born 14 May 1985) is an Australian rules football player formerly of the Western Bulldogs in the Australian Football League (AFL). He was chosen in the 2002 AFL draft at pick number four as a first round selection. Being 196 cm tall, the Bulldogs recruited him because of his potential to hold down a key forward position. He wore the number 26 guernsey.

Walsh debuted in season 2005 kicking a goal in his first game. However, a finger injury forced him to return to Werribee. He missed the whole of season 2006 because of a long term leg injury, at a time when the Bulldogs were in desperate need of some height.

The 2006 Record described Walsh as a good prospect as a future key forward. However, Walsh was delisted by the Bulldogs following the 2007 AFL season after succumbing to injury again during the season and failing to gain a senior position.
