= Kevin Dyas =

Armagh Gaelic footballer and Collingwood Australian rules footballer

Personal information
- Born: 26 October 1987 (age 39) Dromintee, County Armagh, Northern Ireland
- Height: 5 ft 11 in (180 cm)

Sport
- Sport: Gaelic football
- Position: Centre forward
Club
- Years: Club
- 2005-: Dromintee St Patrick's
Inter-county
- Years: County
- 2007, 2010–: Armagh
Inter-county titles
- Ulster titles: 2
- NFL: 1

Kevin Dyas (born 26 October 1987) is a Gaelic footballer who played at senior level for the Armagh county team and for Australian Football League team Collingwood.

== Gaelic football ==
At underage level, Dyas captaining the Armagh minor team to an Ulster Title in 2005. He was also instrumental in guiding his school, Abbey CBS to a MacRory Cup and first ever Hogan Cup title in 2006.

Dyas was a senior football panelist with Armagh in 2007 under Joe Kernan, making his debut against Derry, and also played half back with Armagh club Dromintee.

== Australian rules football ==
Dyas was scouted and recruited by Collingwood and became the second Irish player to be drafted by Collingwood after fellow Irishman Martin Clarke, but unlike Clarke, the club took a gamble with a more mature player in Dyas. Kevin lived with Collingwood's football operations manager Geoff Walsh and his family.

He played 13 games for Collingwood's reserves in the Victorian Football League and looked likely for a senior call-up after some good form, however a severe rupture of his hamstring ruled him out for the 2008 season. A recurrence of the hamstring injury in the 2009 pre-season ruled Dyas out of selection contention for the majority of his second season. Due to this run of hamstring trouble and homesickness he decided to return home after the 2009 season.

== Return ==
In 2009, Dyas returned to Ireland and joined back up with Armagh under the guidance of Down man Paddy O'Rourke.

== Honours ==
- 1 Ulster Under-21 Football Championship 2007
- 1 Ulster Minor Football Championship 2005
- 1 National Football League Division 2 2010
- 1 MacRory Cup 2006
- 1 Hogan Cup 2006
