= Ryan Willits =

Australian rules footballer

Personal information
- Full name: Ryan Willits
- Nickname: Brucey
- Born: 23 January 1987 (age 39); Melbourne, Victoria
- Original team: St Marys (VMFL) / Northern Knights
- Height: 198 cm (6 ft 6 in)
- Weight: 98 kg (15 st 6 lb; 216 lb)

Playing career^{1}
Years	Club	Games (Goals)
2006–2008	Port Adelaide	3 (1)
- ^{1} Playing statistics correct to the end of 2015.

Career highlights
- SANFL debut with Glenelg in 2005; AFL debut with Port Adelaide on 18 August 2006 v Collingwood at AAMI Stadium; West Adelaide Leading Goalkicker 2008 (30); West Adelaide Leading Goalkicker 2009 (29); West Adelaide Premiership player 2015

Ryan Willits (born 23 January 1987 in Melbourne, Victoria) is a former professional Australian rules footballer who played for the Port Adelaide Football Club in the Australian Football League (AFL). He also played for the Glenelg Football Club and West Adelaide Football Club in the South Australian National Football League (SANFL).

== Career ==
Willits debuted for Port late in the 2006 AFL season, playing three games and totalling 25 disposals. In 2007 Willits was delisted by Port Adelaide, before being relisted as a rookie. He was delisted again in 2008, which ended his career at Port Adelaide.

Willits moved to West Adelaide in April 2007 to seek more opportunities to play in a forward role and led the Bloods goal kicking in both 2008 and 2009.

Willits returned to Melbourne after West Adelaide's 2012 SANFL Grand Final loss to Norwood; he signed to play for Northern Football League (NF L) club Montmorency for the 2013 season.

At the end of 2014, Willits announced his intentions to return to Adelaide. His relocation to Adelaide saw him return to playing for West Adelaide for the 2015 SANFL season. Willits played in the ruck in West Adelaide's 11.12 (78) to 7.6 (48) win over Woodville-West Torrens in the 2015 SANFL Grand Final at the Adelaide Oval.
