= Ray Holden =

Australian rules footballer

Personal information
- Full name: Ray Holden
- Born: 3 September 1959 (age 67)
- Original team: Tuart Hill
- Draft: No. 17, 1982 interstate draft
- Height: 191 cm (6 ft 3 in)
- Weight: 87 kg (192 lb)

Playing career^{1}
Years	Club	Games (Goals)
1979–1983	West Perth	79
1984	Melbourne	3 (1)
1985–1986	Perth	16
1987–1988	West Perth	18
- ^{1} Playing statistics correct to the end of 1988.

Ray Holden (born 3 September 1959) is a former Australian rules footballer who played with Melbourne in the Victorian Football League (VFL). He also played for West Perth and Perth in the West Australian Football League (WAFL).

Holden played his first game for West Perth in 1979 but wasn't a regular section until 1981. He was joined by his former Tuart Hill coach Dennis Cometti in 1982 and in the same year played three interstate football matches for Western Australia, starring at full-back against both South Australia and Victoria.

He only made three appearances with Melbourne in 1984, having been unable to play in his favoured full-back position, which had been taken up by Danny Hughes, another first year player.

Unable to transfer back to West Perth as they believed Melbourne were asking for an exorbitant amount of money, Holden was instead signed by Perth. After two injury plagued seasons, Holden returned to West Perth, where he would finish his WAFL career.
