= 1982 VFL draft =

Draft for the Victorian Football League

The 1982 VFL draft was the second annual national draft held by the Victorian Football League, the leading Australian rules football league.

Held on 19 October 1982, all twelve VFL clubs participated in the draft, each having two picks, with the team finishing last in the 1982 VFL season having first choice, followed by the other eleven clubs in reverse finishing position order. Wooden spooners Footscray Football Club named East Fremantle ruckman Andrew Purser as the first pick of the draft.

The draft was limited to players aged sixteen and above in non-Victorian based competitions and tied players wishing to move to Victoria to the club that drafted them. Eleven South Australians were named, with eight Western Australians, three Tasmanians and two Queenslanders also drafted.

The draft, introduced as an equalisation strategy in response to the increasing transfer fees and player salaries at the time, was discontinued after the 1982 Draft, following requests from Melbourne and Geelong officials to consider a moratorium on interstate transfers, aimed at allowing South and Western Australian clubs hit by the draft to recover. The draft did not reoccur until 1986 and has been held every year since.

Round	Pick	Player	Drafted to	Recruited from	League	Games with new team
1	1	Andrew Purser	Footscray	East Fremantle	WAFL	112
1	2	Allan Sidebottom	St Kilda	Swan Districts	WAFL	55
1	3	Gary Shaw	Collingwood	Claremont	WAFL	32
1	4	Baden Harper	Geelong	Claremont	WAFL	0
1	5	Keith Thomas	Melbourne	Norwood	SANFL	0
1	6	Peter Motley	Sydney	Sturt	SANFL	0
1	7	Bill Lokan	Fitzroy	North Adelaide	SANFL	87
1	8	Brenton Phillips	Essendon	North Adelaide	SANFL	10
1	9	Richard Cousins	North Melbourne	Central District	SANFL	0
1	10	Rod Lester-Smith	Hawthorn	East Fremantle	WAFL	70
1	11	David Palm	Richmond	West Perth	WAFL	104
1	12	Jon Simpson	Carlton	Woodville	SANFL	0
2	13	Peter Walker	Footscray	City South	NTFA	0
2	14	David Grant	St Kilda	City South	NTFA	191
2	15	Carl Herbert	Collingwood	Mayne	QAFL	3
2	16	Brad Hardie	Geelong	South Fremantle	WAFL	0
2	17	Ray Holden	Melbourne	West Perth	WAFL	3
2	18	Greg Anderson	Sydney	Port Adelaide	SANFL	0
2	19	Grantley Fielke	Fitzroy	West Adelaide	SANFL	0
2	20	Tony Antrobus	Essendon	North Adelaide	SANFL	22
2	21	Garry McIntosh	North Melbourne	Norwood	SANFL	0
2	22	Greg Hodson	Hawthorn	West Torrens	SANFL	0
2	23	Mark Rowsley	Richmond	Kedron	QAFL	0
2	24	Chris Gray	Carlton	Swansea	FDFA	0
