= Northern Knights Football Club =

Northern Knights

Names
- Full name: Northern Knights Football Club
- Nickname: Knights

2026 season
- After finals: 5th
- Home-and-away season: 1st (Minor Premiers)

Club details
- Founded: 1992; 34 years ago
- Colours: White Navy Blue
- Competition: Talent League
- Coach: Anthony Rocca & Allana Dickie
- Captain(s): Tate Hodgson & Lola Stone
- Premierships: Talent League (4) 1993, 1994, 1995, 1996
- Ground: Preston City Oval, Preston

Other information
- Official website: NKFC

The Northern Knights is an Australian rules football club playing in the Talent League, the top statewide under-18 competition in Victoria, Australia. They are based in Preston, representing the northern suburban area of Melbourne.

The Knights are one of the six original clubs set up as part of a plan by the Victorian State Football League to replace the traditional club zones with independent junior clubs. This was to help aid in player development and the process of the AFL draft, which allows U18 players the opportunity to be selected by AFL clubs.

Northern Knights have had many of their players drafted into the AFL, including the first two selections in the 2007 AFL draft, Matthew Kreuzer and Trent Cotchin, and the fifth selection in the 2008 AFL draft, Michael Hurley. Previously drafted players include Anthony Rocca, Brent Harvey, Jack Grimes, Lance Whitnall, Brent Stanton, Heath Shaw, Marcus Bontempelli and David Zaharakis.

== Honours ==
=== Talent League Boys ===
- Premierships (4): 1993, 1994, 1995, 1996
- Runners-up: Nil
- Minor Premiers (2): 1994, 2026
- Wooden Spoons (5): 2000, 2004, 2008, 2016, 2022

=== Talent League Girls ===
- Premierships (1): 2019
- Runners-up (1): 2018

Northern Knights were the first club to achieve 3 consecutive premierships in either of the Talent League competitions. They won 4 premierships in a row between 1993 and 1996. They have not won a Talent League Boys premiership since.

== AFL Draftees History ==
- 1992: Daniel Tramontana, Gerard Power, John Barker
- 1993: Shannon Gibson, Chris Johnson, Angelo Lekkas, Adam Simpson, Justin Mallon
- 1994: Anthony Rocca, Daniel Harford, Blake Caracella, Stuart Mangin, Michael Polley, Matthew Collins, Gary Moorcroft, Danny Stevens, Robert Powell, Dean Grainer
- 1995: Simon Prestigiacomo, Shane Clayton, Paul Licuria, Andrew Ukovic, Luke Godden, Scott Grainger, Brent Harvey, Ewan Thompson, Daniel Lowther
- 1996: Lucas Fleming, Jim Plunkett, Andrew Eccles
- 1997: Nick Stevens, Lionel Proctor, Trent Hoppner, Troy Kirwen, Frankie Raso
- 1998: Brad Oborne, Nicolas Lowther
- 1999: Rhyce Shaw, Paul Wheatley, Ben Johnson
- 2000: -
- 2001: Shane Harvey, Leigh Montagna, Ben Finnin, Brent Colbert, Mark McKenzie
- 2002: Tim Walsh
- 2003: Brent Stanton, Brayden Shaw, Ricky Dyson, Heath Shaw
- 2004: Adam Pattison, Ryan Willits
- 2005: Ben McKinley, Jack Anthony, Ryan Jackson, Cathal Corr, Paul Currie, Andre Gianfagna
- 2006: Daniel Currie
- 2007: Matthew Kreuzer, Trent Cotchin, Patrick Veszpremi, Jack Grimes, Brett Meredith
- 2008: Michael Hurley, David Zaharakis, Michael Still, Luke Stanton
- 2009: Sam Grimley, Dylan Grimes, Jaryd Cachia
- 2010: Josh Caddy, Tom Hill
- 2011: Billy Longer, Jack Newnes, Michael Mascoulis
- 2012: Nick Vlastuin, Aidan Corr, Nathan Hrovat
- 2013: Marcus Bontempelli, Ben Lennon
- 2014: Kyle Langford, Reece McKenzie, Jayden Short, Jason Castagna
- 2015: Jade Gresham, Brayden Fiorini, Brayden Sier, Tyrone Leonardis, Darcy Macpherson
- 2016: Patrick Lipinski, Matthew Signorello
- 2017: Nick Coffield, Patrick Naish, Jack Petruccelle
- 2018: Justin McInerney, Tom McKenzie
- 2019: Sam Philp
- 2020: Nik Cox, Liam McMahon
- 2021: Josh Ward, Darcy Wilmot, Jackson Archer, Ned Long
- 2022: Cooper Harvey
- 2023: Nate Caddy, Will Green
- 2024: Jesse Dattoli, Thomas Sims, Zak Johnson
- 2025: Nick Driscoll
