= Patrick Veszpremi =

Australian rules footballer

Personal information
- Full name: Patrick Veszpremi
- Born: 1 September 1989 (age 37)
- Original team: Northern Knights (TAC Cup)
- Draft: No. 11, 2007 National Draft, Sydney
- Height: 187 cm (6 ft 2 in)
- Weight: 85 kg (187 lb)
- Position: Midfielder, forward

Playing career^{1}
Years	Club	Games (Goals)
2008–2010	Sydney	11 (12)
2011–2013	Western Bulldogs	12 (5)
Total		23 (17)
- ^{1} Playing statistics correct to the end of 2013.

Patrick Veszpremi (born 1 September 1989) is a former Australian rules footballer who played with the Sydney Swans and Western Bulldogs in the Australian Football League (AFL).

Originally from Bundoora, Victoria, Veszpremi was drafted by Sydney from the Northern Knights in the TAC Cup with the eleventh selection in the 2007 AFL draft. He was named in the Under 18 All Australian side as a defender, but also played as a forward, where he once kicked eight goals for the Knights in a final.

Veszpremi made his debut for Sydney in round 18, 2008 against the Western Bulldogs in a 16-point defeat. In his fourth game, against Brisbane, Veszpremi kicked four goals.

Veszpremi was one of five teenage footballers whose final year of junior football was chronicled in the book The Draft: inside the AFL's Search for talent by Emma Quayle, published by Allen and Unwin in September 2008.

At the end of the 2010 AFL season, Veszpremi was traded to the Western Bulldogs. He, along with a late draft pick, were traded for Bulldogs player, Andrejs Everitt.

Veszpremi was delisted by the Bulldogs at the conclusion of the 2013 season, having made just 12 appearances for the club in three seasons. After spending the 2014 and 2015 seasons with Pascoe Vale in the Essendon District Football League (EDFL), Veszpremi played for the Essendon Doutta Stars Football Club in 2016.
