= Robert Elphinstone =

Australian rules footballer

Personal information
- Full name: Robert P. Elphinstone
- Born: 22 November 1960 (age 65)
- Original team: Seaford
- Height: 191 cm (6 ft 3 in)
- Weight: 89 kg (196 lb)

Playing career^{1}
Years	Club	Games (Goals)
1980–1989	St Kilda	157 (51)
- ^{1} Playing statistics correct to the end of 1989.

Robert Elphinstone (born 22 November 1960) is a former Australian rules footballer who played with St Kilda in the Victorian Football League (VFL).

A Seaford recruit, Elphinstone had spent his early sporting years as a golfer and only started playing football in his late teens. He was a half-back, equally at home on the flanks or at centre half-back. Elphinstone, who was nicknamed "Eel", had his best season in 1983 when he averaged 19 disposals and polled 11 votes in the Brownlow Medal count, a total not bettered by any teammates. That year he also represented Victoria at State of Origin football. He tried to join Richmond at the end of the 1985 season. However, he was convinced to remain with the club when 40 of St Kilda's players and their coach, Graeme Gellie, visited him at his home and asked him to stay.
