= Matthew Kreuzer =

Australian rules footballer (born 1989)

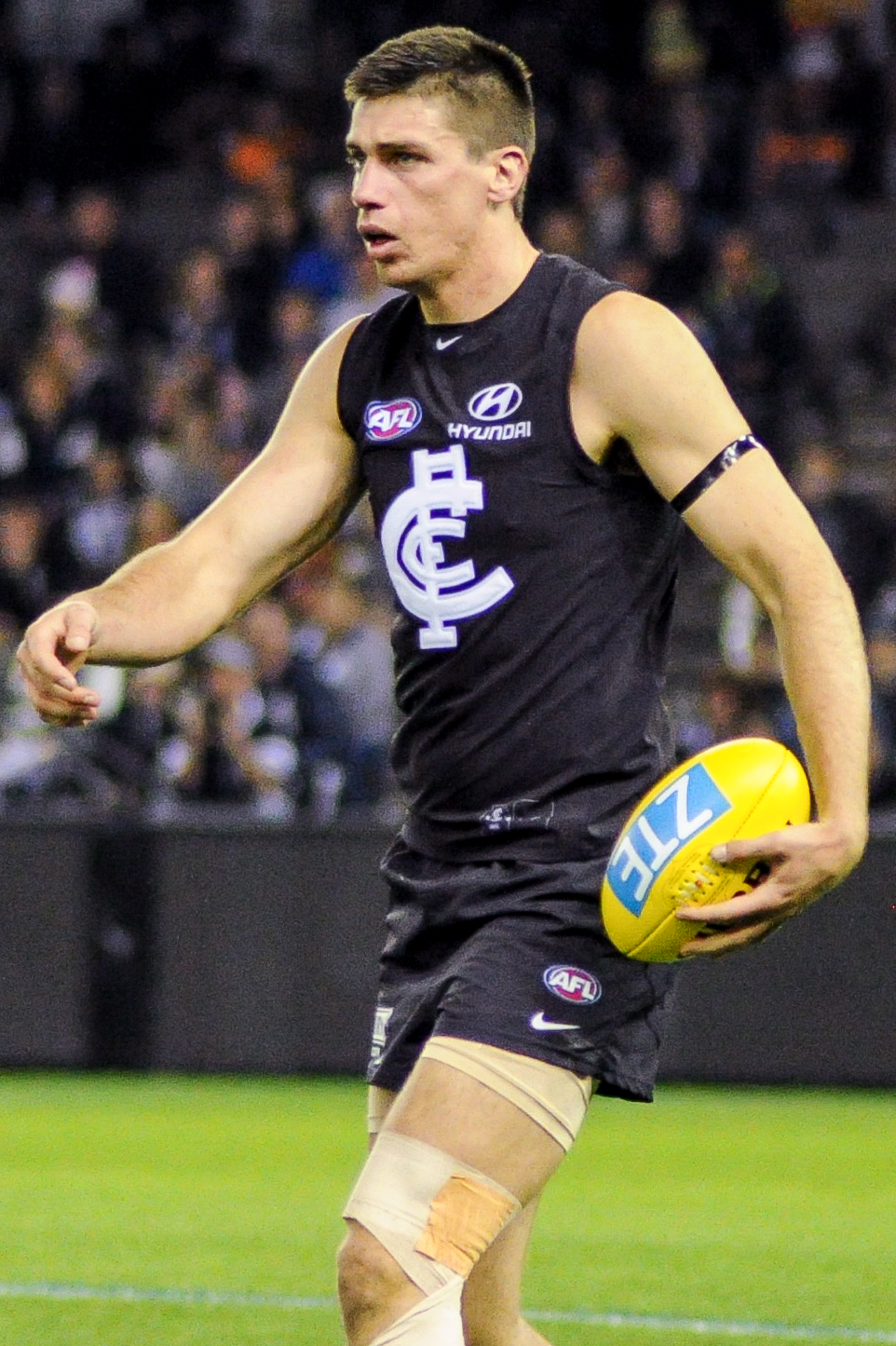
- Kreuzer playing for Carlton in June 2017

Personal information
- Full name: Matthew Kreuzer
- Born: 13 May 1989 (age 37)
- Original team: Northern Knights (TAC Cup)
- Draft: No. 1 (PP), 2007 National Draft, Carlton
- Height: 200 cm (6 ft 7 in)
- Weight: 101 kg (223 lb)
- Position: Ruckman / Forward

Playing career^{1}
Years	Club	Games (Goals)
2008–2020	Carlton	189 (94)
- ^{1} Playing statistics correct to the end of 2020.

Career highlights
- Morrish Medal 2007; 2008 AFL Rising Star nominee

Matthew Kreuzer (born 13 May 1989) is a retired professional Australian rules footballer who played for the Carlton Football Club in the Australian Football League (AFL). He was selected first overall pick in the 2007 AFL draft. He announced his retirement in September 2020.

== Junior career ==
Kreuzer played for St Mary's Greensborough Junior Football Club, part of the Yarra Junior Football League, in Melbourne's north as a junior, before moving to the Northern Knights to play under-18s football in the TAC Cup in 2006 and 2007. Kreuzer established himself as both the team's No. 1 ruckman and as a key forward during that time, scoring 51 goals in his 33 games with the Knights. In 2007, he won the Morrish Medal and the Knights' best and fairest, and he was selected in the Victorian Metropolitan and All-Australian under-18s teams, and in the TAC Cup Teams of the Year in both 2006 and 2007.

Noted for possessing a level of agility and endurance unusual for a player of his size, Kreuzer was widely expected to be selected early in the 2007 AFL Draft. He was selected by Carlton with its priority draft pick (No. 1 overall) in the draft; Carlton received that draft pick only after losing its final round match against Melbourne in 2007, a controversial match which became known as the Kreuzer Cup.

== Professional career ==
Kreuzer made his AFL debut in Round 3 of the 2008 season against Essendon at the MCG on 5 April 2008, impressing on debut and scoring a goal with his first kick. He played largely as the second ruckman through the early part of the season. He earned a NAB Rising Star nomination in his ninth game (against Port Adelaide), after moving into the forward-line in the final quarter and scoring three goals, which helped Carlton overcome a 30-point deficit in wet conditions; he would ultimately poll eleven votes to finish fourth for the award. Towards the end of the season, Kreuzer was playing both ruck and forward roles. He was noted for his accuracy in front of goal, scoring 13 goals and only one behind in his debut season.

Kreuzer played all twenty-three games in his second season, again sharing ruck duties and spending some time in the forward-line, again scoring thirteen goals. He finished fifth in the John Nicholls Medal. Kreuzer continued as one of the club's top two ruckmen in 2010, and he played his 50th AFL game in Round 7.

In Round 13, 2010, after 56 consecutive games from debut, Kreuzer ruptured his anterior cruciate ligament after landing awkwardly in a marking contest. He had a conventional knee reconstruction, and missed eleven months of football, returning to VFL football in May 2011 and to Carlton in Round 12, 2011. He played every game for the rest of the 2011 home-and-away season, but after 12 months out of the game was well below his best, polling best-and-fairest votes only once.

In 2013, Kreuzer injured his foot in Carlton's round 1 33-point loss to Port Adelaide at Marvel Stadium. It was the same foot that Kreuzer had operated on at the end of 2013.

In 2017, Kreuzer had a career best season only missing one game. He was selected in the initial 40-man All Australian squad and finished third in Carlton's best and fairest.

Before the beginning of the 2018 season it was announced that Kreuzer would be part of Carlton's new leadership group for the first time in his career.

At the end of the 2018 season, Kreuzer had relinquished his position in the leadership group, along with Alex Silvagni and Lachlan Plowman.

In the opening round of the 2020 AFL season against Richmond, Kreuzer suffered a foot injury which initially ruled him out for three to four months, but he did not play again and announced his retirement, with immediate effect, on 10 September 2020. Following his retirement, Kreuzer was appointed ruck coach at Carlton in December 2020.

== Personal life ==
His father is of Dutch heritage.

Outside of football, Kreuzer is a civil engineer.

== Statistics ==
Statistics are correct to the end of round 1, 2020

Legend
G	Goals	K	Kicks	D	Disposals	T	Tackles
B	Behinds	H	Handballs	M	Marks	H/O	Hit-outs

Season	Team	No.	Games	Totals								Averages (per game)								Votes
Season	Team	No.	Games	G	B	K	H	D	M	T	H/O	G	B	K	H	D	M	T	H/O	Votes
2008	Carlton	8	20	13	1	96	99	195	59	45	183	0.7	0.1	4.8	5.0	9.8	3.0	2.3	9.2	1
2009	Carlton	8	23	13	11	123	197	320	73	71	394	0.6	0.5	5.3	8.6	13.9	3.2	3.1	17.1	1
2010	Carlton	8	13	5	4	65	94	159	29	62	239	0.4	0.3	5.0	7.2	12.2	2.2	4.8	18.4	1
2011	Carlton	8	12	7	7	66	74	140	27	44	148	0.6	0.6	5.5	6.2	11.7	2.3	3.7	12.3	3
2012	Carlton	8	20	10	8	146	97	243	60	66	450	0.5	0.4	7.3	4.9	12.2	3.0	3.3	22.5	3
2013	Carlton	8	17	8	11	116	79	195	56	71	428	0.5	0.6	6.8	4.6	11.5	3.3	4.2	25.2	6
2014	Carlton	8	1	0	0	9	5	14	3	0	13	0.0	0.0	9.0	5.0	14.0	3.0	0.0	13.0	0
2015	Carlton	8	13	9	5	91	75	166	40	55	276	0.7	0.4	7.0	5.8	12.8	3.1	4.2	21.2	3
2016	Carlton	8	21	7	8	136	95	231	46	84	429	0.3	0.4	6.5	4.5	11.0	2.2	4.0	20.4	0
2017	Carlton	8	21	12	12	206	115	321	69	107	665	0.6	0.6	9.8	5.5	15.3	3.3	5.1	31.7	5
2018	Carlton	8	12	5	5	99	60	159	24	41	276	0.4	0.4	8.3	5.0	13.3	2.0	3.4	23.0	1
2019	Carlton	8	15	5	5	127	69	196	30	34	467	0.3	0.3	8.5	4.6	13.1	2.0	2.3	31.1	3
2020	Carlton	8	1	0	0	0	1	1	1	1	7	0.0	0.0	0.0	1.0	1.0	1.0	1.0	7.0	0
Career			189	94	77	1280	1060	2340	517	681	3975	0.5	0.4	6.8	5.6	12.4	2.7	3.6	21.0	27
