= Jarrod Silvester =

Australian rules footballer (born 1985)

Jarrod B. Silvester

Personal information
- Born: 31 January 1985 (age 41)
- Original team: Rupertswood/ Calder Cannons / Coburg
- Height: 192 cm (6 ft 4 in)
- Weight: 92 kg (203 lb)

Playing career^{1}
Years	Club	Games (Goals)
2008–2009	Richmond	5 (0)
2010–2011	West Adelaide	38 (1)
- ^{1} Playing statistics correct to the end of 2011.

Career highlights
- 2007, 2008 VFL Team of the Year; 2011 SANFL Team of the Year

Jarrod B. Silvester was an Australian rules football player for Australian Football League (AFL) club Richmond. He previously played for the Calder Cannons and Victorian Football League (VFL) side Coburg after initially failing to be drafted.

Silvester endured a solid season at Coburg, Richmond's VFL affiliate club, and was subsequently given the opportunity to be rookie listed after training with the Tigers after their poor 2007 AFL season. He impressed and was drafted by the club at pick 17 in the 2008 Rookie draft.

Silvester made his senior AFL debut for Richmond in round 13, 2009. Richmond played St Kilda Football Club on 28 June, in what turned out to be a one sided affair as St Kilda won easily. The debutant Silvester showed plenty of promise as a key backman under a lot of pressure from the top of the table Saints and their powerful forward line up.

Silvester finished the game with 18 possessions, 11 kicks and 7 handballs as well as 7 marks.

The highlight for his first game was an outstanding contested mark deep in defence against Saints star forward Justin Koschitzke late in the first quarter.

He was delisted at the end of the 2009 AFL season and transferred to South Australian National Football League (SANFL) club West Adelaide, earning a place on the 2011 SANFL Team of the Year. After playing 38 games and kicking 1 goal for West Adelaide, employment saw Jarrod return home to Victoria at the conclusion of the 2011 season.

Silvester then started playing for local team Riddells Creek Football Club in the RDFL in 2012. He secured his first senior premiership in 2013 where he played a vital role as centre half forward. He currently still plays for the Riddells Creek Football Club as their key full back
