= Travis Johnstone =

Australian rules footballer, born 1980

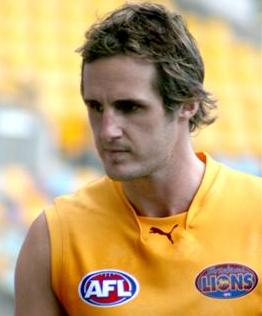
- Johnstone at a Brisbane Lions training session in 2007

Personal information
- Full name: Travis Johnstone
- Nicknames: Jesus, Caveman, Trappa, Tigger
- Born: 17 July 1980 (age 46)
- Original team: Chelsea/Dandenong Stingrays
- Draft: 1st overall, 1997 AFL draft (Melbourne)
- Height: 184 cm (6 ft 0 in)
- Weight: 83 kg (183 lb)
- Position: Midfielder

Playing career^{1}
Years	Club	Games (Goals)
1998–2007	Melbourne	160 (111)
2008–2010	Brisbane Lions	49 (24)
Total		209 (135)
- ^{1} Playing statistics correct to the end of 2010.

Career highlights
- Keith 'Bluey' Truscott Medal: 2005; AFL Rising Star nominee: 1998

Travis Johnstone (born 17 July 1980) is an Australian rules footballer who has played for the Melbourne Football Club and Brisbane Lions in the Australian Football League (AFL). He is the grandson of former Fitzroy Lions player, Norm Johnstone.

== AFL career at Melbourne ==
Johnstone was the first selection in the 1997 AFL draft and made his debut in the 1998 season.

Johnstone took time to develop into a star player for Melbourne, and for some time was criticised in the football media for underachieving as a number 1 draft selection.

In 2002 he finished equal fourth in Brownlow Medal voting, and in 2005 he won his first Melbourne Best and Fairest Award, the Keith 'Bluey' Truscott Medal, and he led the AFL in total kicks.

Johnstone gradually developed into a midfielder possessing terrific vision and skill, who in 2006 for the second year in a row, led the team in the Brownlow Medal, with 11 votes. During the year he accumulated 469 disposals at 21 an outing, which included first for inside 50s (87) and third for rebounds from 50 (55), and was also 5th in tackles (77).

In 2007 Johnstone struggled to capture his best form and was not helped by an Achilles tendon injury holding him to only 15 games. Johnstone produced a career-high 42 disposals in what would be his final game for the Demons in round 22 against Carlton.

Throughout his career at Melbourne, Travis Johnstone was recognised as one of the AFL's most dangerous and talented midfielders; however, he often struggled for consistency, and finished in the Truscott Medal top ten only twice.

== Trade to the Brisbane Lions ==
On 11 October 2007 it was confirmed that the Brisbane Lions had acquired the 27-year-old midfielder from Melbourne for draft pick number 14 in the 2007 national draft, which the Lions had received from Collingwood in a trade for young ruckman Cameron Wood. This came after weeks of speculation over Johnstone's future with the club. New coach Dean Bailey was openly looking for high draft picks and Johnstone was considered a more expendable, yet of decent value. After the clubs confirmed Johnstone was now a Lion, the Melbourne Football Club was bombarded with phone calls from angry supporters who were furious that Johnstone was traded, proving that Johnstone was a very popular player among fans. In his debut for the Lions in Round 1, he amassed 20 disposals off the bench in their loss to the West Coast Eagles. The week after, Johnstone managed 22 disposals in Brisbane's nailbiting 2-point win against the Collingwood Magpies. Arguably his finest game for Brisbane to date came in the Lions' Round 8, 2008 win over Carlton where Johnstone amassed 32 disposals, six tackles and three goals. In round 11 2010, Johnstone managed a remarkable 37 disposals in a one-point loss to North Melbourne.

On 28 October 2010, Johnstone was delisted from the Lions. Johnstone nominated for the 2010 AFL draft, but began planning to play for the Palmerston Magpies.

== Statistics ==
Legend
G	Goals	K	Kicks	D	Disposals	T	Tackles
B	Behinds	H	Handballs	M	Marks

Season	Team	No.	Games	Totals							Averages (per game)						
Season	Team	No.	Games	G	B	K	H	D	M	T	G	B	K	H	D	M	T
1998	Melbourne	16	13	12	5	102	30	132	29	19	0.9	0.4	7.8	2.3	10.2	2.2	1.5
1999	Melbourne	16	15	8	6	107	56	163	38	17	0.5	0.4	7.1	3.7	10.9	2.5	1.1
2000	Melbourne	16	14	15	5	136	59	195	39	18	1.1	0.4	9.7	4.2	13.9	2.8	1.3
2001	Melbourne	16	5	1	1	44	17	61	23	3	0.2	0.2	8.8	3.4	12.2	4.6	0.6
2002	Melbourne	16	22	21	13	294	123	417	90	43	1.0	0.6	13.4	5.6	19.0	4.1	2.0
2003	Melbourne	16	16	10	4	188	67	255	53	24	0.6	0.3	11.8	4.2	15.9	3.3	1.5
2004	Melbourne	16	16	12	7	195	63	258	57	32	0.8	0.4	12.2	3.9	16.1	3.6	2.0
2005	Melbourne	16	22	15	10	363	81	444	85	59	0.7	0.5	16.5	3.7	20.2	3.9	2.7
2006	Melbourne	16	22	10	11	355	114	469	116	77	0.5	0.5	16.1	5.2	21.3	5.3	3.5
2007	Melbourne	16	15	7	5	225	69	294	54	43	0.5	0.3	15.0	4.6	19.6	3.6	2.9
2008	Brisbane Lions	4	18	17	11	251	97	348	85	55	0.9	0.6	13.9	5.4	19.3	4.7	3.1
2009	Brisbane Lions	4	16	6	6	185	134	319	59	41	0.4	0.4	11.6	8.4	19.9	3.7	2.6
2010	Brisbane Lions	4	15	1	3	205	125	330	85	42	0.1	0.2	13.7	8.3	22.0	5.7	2.8
Career			209	135	87	2650	1035	3685	813	473	0.6	0.4	12.7	5.0	17.6	3.9	2.3
