= Andrew Purser =

Australian rules footballer

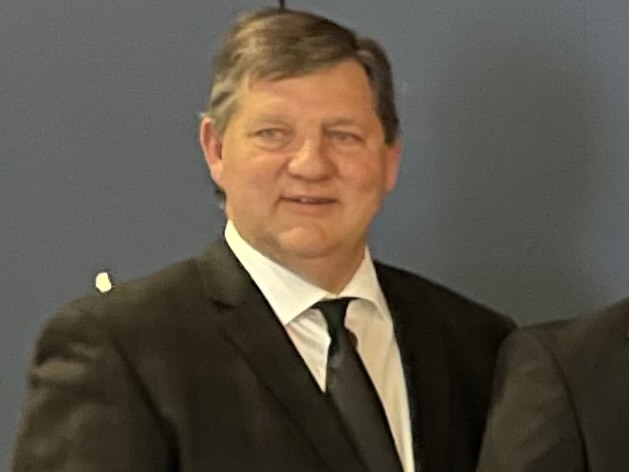
- Purser in 2023

Personal information
- Full name: Andrew Douglas Purser
- Born: 31 October 1958 (age 68)
- Original team: East Fremantle (WAFL)
- Draft: No. 1, 1982 interstate draft
- Height: 193 cm (6 ft 4 in)
- Weight: 83 kg (183 lb)
- Position: Ruckman

Playing career^{1}
Years	Club	Games (Goals)
1978–1982	East Fremantle	85 (29)
1983–1987	Footscray	112 (16)
1988	West Perth	2 (1)
Total		199 (46)

Representative team honours
Years	Team	Games (Goals)
1983–1985	Western Australia	3 (0)
- ^{1} Playing statistics correct to the end of 1988.

Career highlights
- WAFL Premiership player: (1979); Charles Sutton Medal: (1984); Lynn Medal: (1981)

Andrew Douglas Purser (born 31 October 1958) is a former Australian rules footballer who played for the Footscray Football Club in the Victorian Football League (VFL) and for the East Fremantle Football Club and West Perth Football Club in the Western Australian Football League (WAFL).

== Career ==
Purser began his football career in 1978 with East Fremantle Football Club in the Western Australian Football League (WAFL). He played 85 games for East Fremantle over five seasons, where he was a member of the 1979 premiership team and won the club's fairest and best award in 1981.

Purser was drafted No. 1 by the Footscray Football Club in the 1982 VFL draft. He debuted for Footscray in 1983 and played 112 VFL games over five seasons. He was awarded the Charles Sutton Medal in 1984 as the club's best and fairest and in 1985 he helped the club reach the preliminary final, where they lost to Hawthorn by 10 points. He also represented Western Australia football in 1983, 1984 and 1985.

Purser returned to Western Australia in 1988 and played two games for West Perth Football Club in the WAFL before retiring from football at age 28 to pursue a career in the finance industry.

== Profile ==
Purser played as a ruckman. At 193 cm (6 ft 4 in), he was considered undersized for the position. He was bound by a Footscray club rule to not enter the forward 50 and to always remain a kick behind play.

== Personal life ==
Purser and his wife, Jenny, have two children. His son, Ben, is a basketball player.
