= 1982 WAFL season =

Australian rules football season

- Teams: 8
- Premiers: Swan Districts; 4th premiership
- Minor premiers: Claremont; 8th minor premiership
- Sandover Medallist: Phil Narkle (Swan Districts)
- Bernie Naylor Medallist: Warren Ralph (Claremont)
- Matches played: 88
- Highest: 18,556

The 1982 WAFL season was the 98th season of the West Australian Football League and its various incarnations. The season opened on 27 March 1982 and concluded on 18 September 1982 with the 1982 WAFL Grand Final contested between Claremont and Swan Districts. Under the coaching of John Todd, Swans won the 1982, 1983 and 1984 premierships before the financial lure of the VFL deprived it one by one of the stars of this period. The black and whites’ win was marred a little, however, by their decision to play a virtual reserve grade lineup against Richmond in an Escort Cup quarter-final after the game was postponed twice (Note: The match was originally scheduled to be played on 1 June, but was postponed to 16 June and then 23 June, despite a request from Swan Districts to play in Perth on the afternoon (prime television time in Melbourne) of Monday, 21 June.) and the VFL Tigers refused to play the match at Subiaco Oval on a Monday afternoon – Richmond won 33.16 (214) to 4.4 (28) and Swan Districts were suspended from the competition until 1985, despite the WAFL approving of their decision after Todd argued it was normal practice among VFL clubs to play reserves players in the Escort Cup.

Although 1982 did not equal the numerous high-scoring records set the previous season, scoring continued high with an average score of 117.86 points per team per game, and featured the highest losing score in League history and the most scoring shots by a losing team in any major Australian Rules competition.

The WAFL also showed concern from the start of the season about declining attendances – a problem that was to lead to radical changes to the structure of Australian Rules in subsequent years. Employment opportunities created by the mining boom in the Pilbara had caused several WAFL players to play in the De Grey league without a clearance during 1981, and the league announced players who did this would be suspended from the WAFL for two full seasons, though none actually were despite Ian Williams playing a practice match on 3 April for Port Hedland Panthers.

Subiaco, depleted by their inability to afford to retain star State of Origin on-baller Gary Buckenara and the absence of league-quality key forwards, set an unwanted record of losing their first sixteen matches, beating by one game their own record from 1902 and that of West Perth in 1939 for the worst start to a season in Western Australian League football. (Note: Expansion club Peel Thunder would break this record twice in their first seven seasons – losing all twenty games in 1999 and their first eighteen in 2003.) The Lions ultimately became the first one-win WAFL team since Swan Districts in 1968 – their only win was like the 1968 Swans against East Fremantle. (Note: Other open-age WA(N)FL teams between 1918 and 1996 with only one win during a season were Perth in 1923, Claremont-Cottesloe in 1926 and 1927, West Perth in 1939 and Swan Districts in 1951.) Under new president Rod Brown and coach Dennis Cometti West Perth, despite considerable injury problems early in the season, were the one major improver, rising to third and kicking a record finals score in their first major round match for four seasons, in the process becoming the most-watched team in the league and stimulating crowds in a tough season financially.

== Season ==
=== Round 1 ===
	Round 1
Saturday, 27 March	Subiaco 13.11 (89)	def. by	West Perth 15.21 (111)	Subiaco Oval (crowd: 8457)
Saturday, 27 March	South Fremantle 24.25 (169)	def.	Perth 12.12 (84)	Fremantle Oval (crowd: 8260)
Saturday, 27 March	Claremont 20.9 (129)	def.	East Perth 16.20 (116)	Claremont Oval (crowd: 10276)
Saturday, 27 March	Swan Districts 20.28 (148)	def. by	East Fremantle 23.17 (155)	Bassendean Oval (crowd: 9338)
A depleted Tiger defence wins over East Perth via pure improvisation as the Tigers’ efficient forwards show their superiority – Malaxos kicks 7.2 (44).; An inaccurate Swan Districts team nearly comes back from eight goals down at quarter time, being hindered only by 2.7 (19) in the third quarter for a total of 3.15 (33) into the wind. It is the most scoring shots by a losing side in a major Australian Rules competition, and for two weeks the highest losing score in the WAFL.

=== Round 2 ===
	Round 2
Saturday, 3 April	West Perth 30.15 (195)	def.	South Fremantle 11.16 (82)	Leederville Oval (crowd: 12063)
Saturday, 3 April	Perth 16.10 (106)	def.	Subiaco 13.17 (95)	Lathlain Park (crowd: 6127)
Saturday, 3 April	East Fremantle 15.10 (100)	def. by	Claremont 23.13 (151)	East Fremantle Oval (crowd: 7987)
Sunday, 4 April	East Perth 17.9 (111)	def. by	Swan Districts 20.25 (145)	Perth Oval (crowd: 11921)
West Perth gain comprehensive revenge for South Fremantle’s record open-age 1981 score with a first-class display – with a badly depleted team they handed the Bulldogs their worst loss since the 1978 Preliminary Final.; Warren Ralph, Steve Malaxos and Brett Farmer show the loss of Jim and Phil Krakouer has not affected them as the first two combine for 15 goals and one behind, whilst Farmer – despite not scoring a goal – creates most of the opportunities for the other two.

=== Round 3 (Easter weekend) ===
	Round 3
Saturday, 10 April	Swan Districts 25.18 (168)	def.	West Perth 13.13 (91)	Bassendean Oval (crowd: 14678)
Saturday, 10 April	Perth 9.8 (62)	def. by	East Perth 17.9 (111)	Lathlain Park (crowd: 7520)
Monday, 12 April	South Fremantle 20.19 (139)	def.	Claremont 17.9 (111)	Fremantle Oval (crowd: 12750)
Monday, 12 April	Subiaco 14.26 (110)	def. by	East Fremantle 23.15 (153)	Subiaco Oval (crowd: 7027)
Mike Richardson, Phil Narkle and Allan Sidebottom showed their importance to Swan Districts in a superb win over the new "glamour" club that maintained an unbeaten record against the Cardinals since 1979.; Bulldogs end Claremont’s run of sixteen straight victories; their last loss had been on the same ground in the ninth round of 1981.; Subiaco’s lack of method and directness in attack is clearly revealed as they scramble constantly towards goal but are never in the match despite having more shots.

=== Round 4 ===
	Round 4
Saturday, 17 April	Perth 20.14 (134)	def. by	Swan Districts 26.14 (170)	Lathlain Park (crowd: 5625)
Saturday, 17 April	East Perth 26.15 (171)	def.	West Perth 24.7 (151)	Perth Oval (crowd: 12276)
Saturday, 17 April	Claremont 21.18 (144)	def.	Subiaco 10.16 (76)	Claremont Oval (crowd: 6074)
Saturday, 17 April	East Fremantle 11.11 (77)	def. by	South Fremantle 24.28 (172)	East Fremantle Oval (crowd: 13125)
West Perth kick the highest losing score in WAFL history, beating the previous record of three rounds before by three points. The Cardinals had eight regulars out and lost two more in a game played at breakneck pace, whilst former Melbourne player Peter Thorne wins the game for the Royals at the finish.; 11.1 (67) into the breeze in the second quarter gives Swan Districts a crucial victory that elevates them to top position against a gallant Perth team that unusually matches their vaunted centreline and has the redoubtable Narkle shifted to half-forward.

=== Round 5 ===
	Round 5
Saturday, 24 April	Swan Districts 26.18 (174)	def.	Subiaco 15.15 (105)	Bassendean Oval (crowd: 6030)
Saturday, 24 April	East Perth 18.15 (123)	def.	South Fremantle 16.11 (107)	Subiaco Oval (crowd: 11657)
Saturday, 24 April	Claremont 27.24 (186)	def.	Perth 10.8 (68)	Claremont Oval (crowd: 6189)
Saturday, 24 April	West Perth 21.10 (136)	def. by	East Fremantle 22.16 (148)	Leederville Oval (crowd: 11020)
Warren Ralph and Steve Malaxos continue their dominance opposition defences with 7.3 (45) apiece to be the top two in goalkicking and invite expectations of two century goalkickers from one club in a season.; East Perth ruckman John Ironmonger gives a timely reminder of his talents as he beats dual Sandover winner Stephen Michael and leaves South Fremantle’s powerful attack spasmodic.

=== Round 6 ===
	Round 6
Saturday, 1 May	Subiaco 18.10 (118)	def. by	South Fremantle 18.13 (121)	Subiaco Oval (crowd: 5656)
Saturday, 1 May	Perth 18.10 (118)	def. by	West Perth 25.12 (162)	Lathlain Park (crowd: 5927)
Saturday, 1 May	Swan Districts 16.12 (108)	def.	Claremont 12.16 (88)	Bassendean Oval (crowd: 14270)
Saturday, 1 May	East Fremantle 17.9 (111)	def. by	East Perth 19.13 (127)	East Fremantle Oval (crowd: 7281)
The return of injury-plagued rover Ed Blackaby for only his twenty-seventh game since the beginning of 1980 inspires Swans to win what looked even at this early stage like a Grand Final preview – despite lacking key big man Allan Sidebottom.; A tactical blunder by East Fremantle – which leave key players Sewell and Lester-Smith out of action – allow East Perth to dominate with a strong wind in the first quarter and hold on as Old Easts fight back.

=== Round 7 ===
	Round 7
Saturday, 8 May	South Fremantle 12.7 (79)	def. by	Swan Districts 28.16 (184)	Fremantle Oval (crowd: 14123)
Saturday, 8 May	East Perth 14.13 (97)	def.	Subiaco 13.15 (93)	Perth Oval (crowd: 6110)
Saturday, 8 May	West Perth 16.13 (109)	def. by	Claremont 14.15 (99)	Leederville Oval (crowd: 8567)
Sunday, 9 May	Perth 18.14 (122)	def. by	East Fremantle 24.18 (162)	Subiaco Oval (crowd: 4055)
In their most brilliant display yet, Swan Districts inflict South Fremantle’s first defeat at Fremantle since Round 9, 1980 – which would have been worse against the impassable Tom Mulooly but for eight last-quarter goals.; East Pert come back for a thrilling win over the unlucky Lions, as Peter Thorne's roving around goals brings him five goals in the final term after Subiaco were 34 points ahead at half-time.

=== Round 8 ===
	Round 8
Saturday, 15 May	West Perth 15.14 (104)	def.	Subiaco 12.13 (85)	Leederville Oval (crowd: 7088)
Saturday, 15 May	Perth 13.15 (93)	def. by	South Fremantle 14.19 (103)	Lathlain Park (crowd: 4620)
Saturday, 15 May	East Perth 11.11 (77)	def. by	Claremont 13.19 (97)	Perth Oval (crowd: 10985)
Saturday, 15 May	East Fremantle 13.15 (93)	def. by	Swan Districts 19.21 (135)	Subiaco Oval (crowd: 7437)
In wet conditions Claremont end an "uncharacteristic" losing streak by for the first time training every night during the week and showing that Gary Shaw and Michael Mitchell have fully compensated for the loss of the Krakouers.; Perth come close to an upset win for the third consecutive week only to be unexpectedly halted by the eclipse of spearhead Mick Rea – who had kicked seven the previous round.; Demon coach Ian Miller acted as his own runner during the first quarter before a strained leg kept him off the field and regular Ken Inman took over in the rain.

=== Round 9 ===
	Round 9
Saturday, 22 May	South Fremantle 17.17 (119)	def.	West Perth 15.14 (104)	Fremantle Oval (crowd: 10980)
Saturday, 22 May	Swan Districts 22.16 (148)	def.	East Perth 16.15 (111)	Bassendean Oval (crowd: 14928)
Saturday, 22 May	Subiaco 19.15 (129)	def. by	Perth 23.17 (155)	Subiaco Oval (crowd: 4690)
Saturday, 22 May	Claremont 24.22 (166)	def.	East Fremantle 19.8 (122)	Claremont Oval (crowd: 7417)
Swan Districts produce remarkable courage to come back from thirty-three points down late in the second quarter with only seventeen fit players as Blackaby dominates the roving and Peter Kenny shuts down East Perth centre half-forward Hayes.; The move of forward pocket Cam Shepherd into the centre cuts off Subiaco’s control there and ensures fellow tailender Perth maintains the Lions’ winless record.

=== Round 10 ===
	Round 10
Saturday, 29 May	West Perth 20.21 (141)	def.	Swan Districts 11.13 (79)	Leederville Oval (crowd: 10327)
Saturday, 29 May	East Perth 20.13 (133)	def.	Perth 12.11 (83)	Perth Oval (crowd: 7050)
Saturday, 29 May	Claremont 21.16 (142)	def. by	South Fremantle 21.19 (145)	Claremont Oval (crowd: 10665)
Saturday, 29 May	East Fremantle 17.10 (112)	def.	Subiaco 13.14 (92)	East Fremantle Oval (crowd: 4241)
West Perth confirm they are the big improvers of 1982 with a superb victory over top club Swan Districts. Despite winning only seven hit-outs to 30, West Perth’s smaller brigade consistently takes the ball away and Ray Holden keeps future Carlton forward Peter Sartori to 0.2 (2).; In an exceptionally high-standard game, South Fremantle’s first-half forward brilliance keeps them in the match after Claremont score 9.3 (57) to 3.6 (24) in the third quarter – then South Fremantle’s superior forward play in showery weather allows them to overhaul the Tigers in a low-scoring last quarter.

=== Round 11 (Foundation Day) ===
	Round 11
Saturday, 5 June	Swan Districts 19.14 (128)	def.	Perth 14.14 (98)	Bassendean Oval (crowd: 7167)
Saturday, 5 June	West Perth 14.20 (104)	def.	East Perth 13.10 (88)	Leederville Oval (crowd: 15872)
Monday, 7 June	Subiaco 8.17 (65)	def. by	Claremont 14.11 (95)	Subiaco Oval (crowd: 5100)
Monday, 7 June	South Fremantle 13.16 (94)	def. by	East Fremantle 16.11 (107)	Fremantle Oval (crowd: 10600)
Six goals into the wind on a very wet day provides a remarkable victory for East Fremantle, as the inspiration of Alexander drives rovers Taylor and Rankin to a decisive effort. Old Easts end a run of fifteen consecutive century scores by their derby rivals – at the time the longest on record in the WA(N)FL and only exceeded twice since.; 1981 premiership rover Mark Watson returns to life Claremont out of a hole against the luckless Lions – who would have sealed the game in torrential rain by half-time but for inaccuracy and then score only 1.6 (12) to 9.11 (65) in the second half.

=== Round 12 ===
	Round 12
Saturday, 12 June	Subiaco 13.16 (94)	def. by	Swan Districts 25.17 (167)	Subiaco Oval (crowd: 4574)
Saturday, 12 June	East Perth 19.21 (135)	def.	South Fremantle 14.12 (96)	Perth Oval (crowd: 7093)
Saturday, 12 June	Perth 19.15 (129)	def. by	Claremont 32.18 (210)	Lathlain Park (crowd: 4176)
Saturday, 12 June	East Fremantle 14.14 (98)	def. by	West Perth 21.15 (141)	East Fremantle Oval (crowd: 6401)
Subiaco, despite several competitive games, show they have learned little as poor discipline and errors like missed handballs out of bounds and high kicks to no-one are exploited by a Swan Districts team severely weakened by interstate calls.; In a match regarded by critics as a "danger game" for the Tigers due to injuries and walkout of Brett Farmer, claremoent effortlessly thrash the Demons with stand-in full-forward Murray Smith kicking six and Malaxos another five.

=== Round 13 ===
	Round 13
Saturday, 19 June	South Fremantle 24.30 (174)	def.	Subiaco 11.9 (75)	Fremantle Oval (crowd: 4570)
Saturday, 19 June	Perth 14.11 (95)	def. by	West Perth 18.18 (126)	Lathlain Park (crowd: 5298)
Saturday, 19 June	Claremont 18.16 (124)	def.	Swan Districts 17.12 (114)	Claremont Oval (crowd: 12951)
Saturday, 19 June	East Perth 19.13 (127)	def.	East Fremantle 9.16 (70)	Subiaco Oval (crowd: 7967)
Swans' inability to hold off Ralph and Malaxos ensures Claremont – despite scoring only 4.6 (30) in the middle two quarters – win the key top-of-the-table battle and stay second on percentage with another vital match coming up.; South Fremantle kick one of only eighteen WAFL scores of over thirty behinds, and their third most on record.; Dreadful kicking by East Fremantle – with Purser missing from 5 metres (5.5 yd) out – has them on 0.8 (8) in good conditions just before half-time, and effectively ends their finals aspirations.

=== Round 14 ===
	Round 14
Saturday, 26 June	Swan Districts 25.15 (165)	def.	South Fremantle 15.14 (104)	Bassendean Oval (crowd: 10151)
Saturday, 26 June	Subiaco 11.13 (79)	def. by	East Perth 13.14 (92)	Subiaco Oval (crowd: 5074)
Saturday, 26 June	East Fremantle 20.16 (136)	def.	Perth 14.13 (97)	East Fremantle Oval (crowd: 3616)
Sunday, 27 June	West Perth 15.11 (101)	def. by	Claremont 16.24 (120)	Leederville Oval (crowd: 18556)
West Perth found they could not conceded a seven-goal start to the Tigers – who let the Cardinals off the hook with bad shooting for goal – and move a game adrift from the double chance.; The pessimistic Mal Brown is not dissatisfied despite his depleted Bulldogs being thrashed by a brilliant Swan Districts team who redeem the controversy over their Escort Cup debacle with one of the finest team displays in memory.

=== Round 15 ===
	Round 15
Saturday, 3 July	Subiaco 13.18 (96)	def. by	West Perth 14.15 (99)	Subiaco Oval (crowd: 3873)
Saturday, 3 July	South Fremantle 25.15 (165)	def.	Perth 9.11 (65)	Fremantle Oval (crowd: 3150)
Saturday, 3 July	Claremont 11.21 (87)	def. by	East Perth 14.6 (90)	Claremont Oval (crowd: 6798)
Saturday, 3 July	Swan Districts 25.19 (169)	def.	East Fremantle 8.12 (60)	Bassendean Oval (crowd: 3873)
Claremont’s wasteful attack in difficult conditions costs them a thrilling match when John Ironmonger kicks two rare goals at the finish.; When Rod Alderton kicked the winning goal after Subiaco ruckman Michael Johns muffed a similar chance Subiaco’s players went to their knees in despair after failing to win a game where they won every clear centre-square possession for a half. The Lions equalled the record, ironically held by the two opponents, for the worst start to a WA(N)FL season.

=== Round 16 ===
	Round 16
Saturday, 10 July	West Perth 13.16 (94)	def.	South Fremantle 10.15 (75)	Subiaco Oval (crowd: 11814)
Saturday, 10 July	East Perth 12.9 (81)	def. by	Swan Districts 15.11 (101)	Perth Oval (crowd: 13908)
Saturday, 10 July	Perth 20.11 (131)	def.	Subiaco 11.19 (85)	Lathlain Park (crowd: 3565)
Saturday, 10 July	East Fremantle 19.8 (122)	def. by	Claremont 22.19 (151)	East Fremantle Oval (crowd: 5351)
The power of big full-forward Mick Rea, who kicks 7.1 (43) and has a hand in several other goals in a match where no other forward scores more than one, ensures Subiaco remain winless and faced with the prospect of the worst open-age WA(N)FL record since Midland Junction’s final season. Perth power away "exuberantly" after an even first three quarters.; Swans’ hard work and discipline ensures they run over East Perth in the final quarter after being behind for the previous two.; Following this round, Western Australia played two interstate matches – one against the Big V on Tuesday and one against South Australia on Saturday 17 July – but critics viewed the two games in a week as too much.

=== Round 17 ===
	Round 17
Saturday, 24 July	Perth 22.11 (143)	def. by	East Perth 24.13 (157)	Lathlain Park (crowd: 4250)
Saturday, 24 July	South Fremantle 14.17 (101)	def.	Claremont 21.19 (145)	Fremantle Oval (crowd: 9300)
Saturday, 24 July	Subiaco 15.20 (110)	def.	East Fremantle 11.10 (76)	Subiaco Oval (crowd: 3350)
Sunday, 25 July	West Perth 20.20 (140)	def.	Swan Districts 9.20 (74)	Leederville Oval (crowd: 15695)
West Perth’s hard, physical approach completely demolished Swan Districts, who lose two players to body-on-body collisions and are never in the hunt on the scoreboard.; Subiaco avoid the ignominy of the first winless season in senior WAFL football since 1917, winning well against a "spineless and undisciplined" Old Easts after a mistake-riddled first half as four quick goals early in the last quarter seal the issue after the Lions were four points ahead at the last change.

=== Round 18 ===
	Round 18
Saturday, 31 July	Perth 16.17 (113)	def. by	Swan Districts 25.16 (166)	Subiaco Oval (crowd: 4456)
Saturday, 31 July	East Perth 14.18 (102)	def. by	West Perth 18.8 (116)	Perth Oval (crowd: 14794)
Saturday, 31 July	Claremont 28.23 (191)	def.	Subiaco 20.15 (135)	Claremont Oval (crowd: 5251)
Saturday, 31 July	East Fremantle 11.14 (80)	def. by	South Fremantle 21.12 (138)	East Fremantle Oval (crowd: 6449)
Two goals behind most of the afternoon, West Perth finish the match by kick 6.3 (39) to 0.5 (5) in a style that has them seen as premiership prospects for the first time since 1975.; The much-maligned Chris Stainowsky – discarded by West Perth – kicks 7.4 (46) as South Fremantle run away to kick 8.2 (50) to nothing after Old Easts looked like a surprise comeback victory.

=== Round 19 ===
	Round 19
Saturday, 7 August	Swan Districts 18.25 (133)	def.	Subiaco 9.4 (58)	Bassendean Oval (crowd: 3058)
Saturday, 7 August	South Fremantle 20.20 (140)	def.	East Perth 14.10 (94)	Fremantle Oval (crowd: 8230)
Saturday, 7 August	Perth 13.10 (88)	def. by	Claremont 28.13 (181)	Subiaco Oval (crowd: 3427)
Saturday, 7 August	West Perth 21.18 (144)	def.	East Fremantle 7.4 (46)	Leederville Oval (crowd: 3972)
8.6 (54) in slippery conditions during the second quarter ensures South Fremantle gain a convincing win and enter the four for the first time since Round 11 at their victims’ expense.; Despite scoring 3.18 (36) to 4.0 (24) in the final forty-seven minutes, Swan Districts win easily against the struggling Lions, with the nomadic Baker settling into his future Bomber role as a centreman after previous playing as a forward or ruck-rover.

=== Round 20 ===
	Round 20
Saturday, 14 August	Subiaco 19.11 (125)	def. by	South Fremantle 19.15 (129)	Subiaco Oval (crowd: 5362)
Saturday, 14 August	West Perth 15.23 (113)	def.	Perth 9.14 (68)	Leederville Oval (crowd: 5256)
Saturday, 14 August	Swan Districts 15.16 (106)	def. by	Claremont 22.12 (144)	Bassendean Oval (crowd: 14840)
Saturday, 14 August	East Fremantle 10.16 (76)	def. by	East Perth 20.16 (136)	East Fremantle Oval (crowd: 4585)
A high-standard, vigorous match – featuring much unnecessary aggression despite there being no reports as seen by 83 free kicks being given – sees Subiaco lose by under a goal for the fourth time in 1982 and leaves South lamenting the failure to boost its percentage.

=== Round 21 ===
	Round 21
Saturday, 21 August	South Fremantle 15.10 (100)	def. by	Swan Districts 23.15 (153)	Fremantle Oval (crowd: 11500)
Saturday, 21 August	East Perth 25.15 (165)	def.	Subiaco 12.16 (88)	Perth Oval (crowd: 6710)
Saturday, 21 August	Claremont 21.14 (140)	def.	West Perth 11.16 (82)	Claremont Oval (crowd: 17395)
Saturday, 21 August	Perth 18.14 (122)	def. by	East Fremantle 19.11 (125)	Lathlain Park (crowd: 2805)
Despite Ralph scoring only 1.4 (10), Claremont produce a superb display that exposes the limitations of the Cardinal attack, aided by the skill of Graham Moss and Wayne Blackwell – who each kick four goals.; 8.0 (48) in twelve minutes of the second quarter secures East Perth’s finals berth, despite being without regular key forwards Paul Arnold and John Hayes, as their numerous rovers carve up the disappointing Lions in coach Ken Armstrong’s final match. (Note: Armstrong would come out of retirement in 1991 to coach Perth again for three unsuccessful seasons.); East Fremantle steal their first win since 26 June from the Demons, who squander three shots out on the full late in the game after being 28 points ahead at half-time.

== Ladder ==
1982 WAFL ladder
Pos	Team	Pld	W	L	D	PF	PA	PP	Pts
1	Claremont	21	16	5	0	2901	2193	132.3	64
2	Swan Districts (P)	21	16	5	0	2935	2224	132.0	64
3	West Perth	21	15	6	0	2564	2160	118.7	60
4	East Perth	21	13	8	0	2444	2226	109.8	52
5	South Fremantle	21	12	9	0	2552	2469	103.4	48
6	East Fremantle	21	8	13	0	2229	2788	79.9	32
7	Perth	21	3	18	0	2174	3012	72.2	12
8	Subiaco	21	1	20	0	2002	2729	73.4	4

Rules for classification: 1) points; 2) percentage; 3) number of points for.
(P) Premiers

== Finals series ==
=== First semi-final ===
	First semi-final
Saturday, 28 August	West Perth 27.18 (180)	def.	East Perth 16.16 (112)	Subiaco Oval (crowd: 28,513)
With fourteen of the last fifteen goals before three-quarter-time West Perth race away to kick the highest first-semi final score in WAFL history, beating Subiaco’s 1959 record against Perth by a point.; The 115 points scored by the two teams in the last quarter is a record for any quarter of a WA(N)FL final.

=== Second semi-final ===
	Second semi-final
Saturday, 4 September	Claremont 12.10 (82)	def. by	Swan Districts 14.26 (110)	Subiaco Oval (crowd: 30,857)
Swan Districts shed their reputation for brittleness under pressure as they out-compete and outwit a hesitant Tiger outfit saved from a thrashing only by inaccuracy.

=== Preliminary final ===
	Preliminary final
Saturday, 11 September	Claremont 18.23 (131)	def.	West Perth 13.15 (93)	Subiaco Oval (crowd: 30,760)
Claremont withstand a Les Fong-led comeback that had West Perth only eight points behind early in the last quarter by kicking seven of the final eight goals.

=== Grand Final ===
1982 WAFL Grand Final
Saturday, 18 September	Swan Districts	def.	Claremont	Subiaco Oval (crowd: 50,883)
5.5 (35); 10.8 (68); 14.15 (99); 18.19 (127)	Q1; Q2; Q3; Final	2.3 (15); 4.9 (33); 4.10 (34); 11.12 (78)	Umpires: Darryl Gillies, Bob Phillips; Simpson Medal: Graham Melrose (Swan Districts)
Baker 3, Boucher 2, Fitzgerald 2, Holmes 2, Richardson 2, Sidebottom 2, Phil Narkle 2, Shine, Solin, Rance	Goals	Goulding 3, Kanther 2, Ralph 2, Jamieson, Malaxos, Harper, Moss
Baker, Sidebottom, Melrose, Mullooly, Phil Narkle, Richardson, Keith Narkle, Boucher	Best	Goulding, Pearce, Betts, Panizza, Moss, Daniels
In the battle of two up-and-coming champion teams, Swan Districts destroy the powerful Tiger attack, holding it to its lowest score since 1980. The scoreboard flattered Claremont who kicked several late goals, and Ralph was goalless until late in the last quarter.
