= 1981 WAFL season =

Australian rules football season

- Teams: Eight
- Premiers: Claremont; 5th premiership
- Minor premiers: Claremont; 6th minor premiership
- Sandover Medallist: Stephen Michael (South Fremantle)
- Bernie Naylor Medallist: Warren Ralph (Claremont)
- Matches played: 88
- Highest: 18,106

The 1981 WAFL season was the 97th season of the West Australian Football League in its various incarnations. The season opened on 11 April and concluded on 3 October with the 1981 WAFL Grand Final between Claremont and South Fremantle. It was the last WAFL season to begin in April and end in October; from 1982 the league shifted the schedule of the season forward by a week and in later years by another.

The 1981 WAFL season is famous because of its prodigious scoring, chiefly by premiers Claremont and runners-up South Fremantle. The Claremont trio of Warren Ralph, and brothers Jimmy and Phil Krakouer broke numerous records related to scoring in single matches and seasons. (Note: This was to be the Krakouer brothers' last season at Claremont, before a move to North Melbourne, where they helped introduce this attacking style of football to the VFL.) During 1981, the 1979 record score by Swan Districts was broken twice, with the last round record by South Fremantle still remaining as the highest score in senior WAFL history. The average score of 123 points per team per game is the highest in WAFL history and as much as ten points higher than the VFL/AFL maximum during 1982, whilst tailender Perth set the unenviable record of conceding 157 points per match, allowing under 100 only on a very wet day against East Perth.

== Home-and-away season ==
=== Round 1 ===
	Round 1
Saturday, 11 April	Swan Districts 21.21 (147)	def.	West Perth 10.12 (72)	Bassendean Oval (crowd: 12467)
Saturday, 11 April	East Perth 25.10 (160)	def.	Perth 14.10 (94)	Perth Oval (crowd: 7626)
Saturday, 11 April	Claremont 22.22 (154)	def.	South Fremantle 18.18 (126)	Claremont Oval (crowd: 10105)
Saturday, 11 April	East Fremantle 21.16 (142)	def.	Subiaco 18.12 (120)	East Fremantle Oval (crowd: 7010)
Impressive commitment and skilful coaching by Moss dispel the expectation South Fremantle would be invincible in 1981.; Bill Valli, who played no pre-season football, takes Subiaco from 55 points down at quarter-time to four points down with ten minutes to go.

=== Round 2 ===
	Round 2
Saturday, 18 April	West Perth 23.16 (154)	def.	East Perth 14.14 (98)	Leederville Oval (crowd: 13053)
Saturday, 18 April	South Fremantle 22.21 (153)	def.	East Fremantle 20.14 (134)	Fremantle Oval (crowd: 14827)
Monday, 20 April	Perth 13.9 (87)	def. by	Swan Districts 38.21 (249)	Lathlain Park (crowd: 10859)
Monday, 20 April	Subiaco 22.21 (153)	def.	Claremont 18.15 (123)	Subiaco Oval (crowd: 9167)
Swan Districts just fail to equal their 1979 record score, but equal the record for most scoring shots. It did beat Perth's previous biggest loss in the 1959 First Semi-Final by 33 points; The dominance of Buckenara and Neil Taylor ensures Subiaco run over Claremont into the breeze in the last quarter.

=== Round 3 ===
	Round 3
Saturday, 25 April	Swan Districts 22.17 (149)	def.	Subiaco 17.11 (113)	Bassendean Oval (crowd: 11070)
Saturday, 25 April	East Perth 21.9 (135)	def.	South Fremantle 17.14 (116)	Perth Oval (crowd: 10426)
Saturday, 25 April	Claremont 29.17 (191)	def.	Perth 12.23 (95)	Subiaco Oval (crowd: 5997)
Saturday, 25 April	East Fremantle 19.25 (139)	def.	West Perth 8.17 (65)	East Fremantle Oval (crowd: 8923)
East Fremantle's unusual policy of playing four roving forwards gives Old Easts an open forward line that completely outplays the Cardinals, as shown by a match total of ninety-three effective handballs to West Perth's fifty.

=== Round 4 ===
	Round 4
Saturday, 2 May	Subiaco 18.16 (124)	def.	West Perth 17.18 (120)	Subiaco Oval (crowd: 8451)
Saturday, 2 May	Perth 17.13 (115)	def. by	South Fremantle 26.28 (184)	Lathlain Park (crowd: 6053)
Saturday, 2 May	Claremont 20.26 (146)	def.	East Perth 17.11 (113)	Claremont Oval (crowd: 10347)
Saturday, 2 May	Swan Districts 28.17 (185)	def.	East Fremantle 12.6 (78)	Bassendean Oval (crowd: 12020)
Six third quarter goals by Demon flanker Doug Simms brings the match to life despite the Demons being thrashed for the fourth successive week and finishing with a percentage of 49.87.

=== Round 5 ===
	Round 5
Saturday, 9 May	South Fremantle 17.19 (121)	def.	Swan Districts 16.16 (112)	Fremantle Oval (crowd: 16120)
Saturday, 9 May	East Perth 23.23 (161)	def.	Subiaco 10.11 (71)	Perth Oval (crowd: 8562)
Saturday, 9 May	Claremont 26.24 (180)	def.	West Perth 13.9 (87)	Subiaco Oval (crowd: 8871)
Saturday, 9 May	East Fremantle 20.21 (141)	def.	Perth 13.20 (98)	East Fremantle Oval (crowd: 5023)

=== Round 6 ===
	Round 6
Saturday, 16 May	Subiaco 13.19 (97)	def. by	South Fremantle 17.13 (115)	Subiaco Oval (crowd: 7930)
Saturday, 16 May	West Perth 18.15 (123)	def.	Perth 17.9 (111)	Leederville Oval (crowd: 7006)
Saturday, 16 May	Swan Districts 27.14 (176)	def.	East Perth 17.13 (115)	Bassendean Oval (crowd: 14107)
Saturday, 16 May	East Fremantle 14.12 (96)	def. by	Claremont 19.12 (126)	East Fremantle Oval (crowd: 8851)
East Perth's gamble to rely on bold attacking play fails as Swan Districts win the toss with a stiff easterly and later dominate the final quarter against this breeze.

=== Round 7 ===
	Round 7
Saturday, 23 May	Perth 22.16 (148)	def.	Subiaco 17.12 (114)	Lathlain Park (crowd: 5018)
Saturday, 23 May	Claremont 24.12 (156)	def.	Swan Districts 16.14 (110)	Claremont Oval (crowd: 16154)
Saturday, 23 May	East Perth 24.12 (156)	def.	East Fremantle 17.10 (112)	Perth Oval (crowd: 9808)
Sunday, 24 May	West Perth 17.14 (116)	def. by	South Fremantle 18.18 (126)	Subiaco Oval (crowd: 11180)
Perth put on 12.6 (78) to 1.2 (8) in 29 minutes around half-time to defeat Subiaco for the fourteenth straight meeting after the Lions led by 22 points with the wind. Alan Johnson dominates in the centre and Subiaco's weakness in key forward positions is too great a handicap.; The WAFL's first Sunday match since 1976, despite a first wet football day, proves a great success, with Stephen Michael's superb ruckwork winning a tight game for the Bulldogs.

=== Round 8 ===
	Round 8
Saturday, 30 May	Swan Districts 31.14 (200)	def.	Perth 10.13 (73)	Bassendean Oval (crowd: 5125)
Saturday, 30 May	Claremont 25.11 (161)	def.	Subiaco 19.12 (126)	Claremont Oval (crowd: 5552)
Monday, 1 June	East Perth 20.18 (138)	def. by	West Perth 22.10 (142)	Perth Oval (crowd: 13564)
Monday, 1 June	East Fremantle 13.15 (93)	def. by	South Fremantle 27.17 (179)	East Fremantle Oval (crowd: 15212)
Led by Les Fong in this 150th match, West Perth, despite a serious knee injury to John Duckworth, come back from 32 points down during the third quarter to win a thriller over their rivals.

=== Round 9 ===
	Round 9
Saturday, 6 June	West Perth 5.10 (40)	def. by	Swan Districts 18.17 (125)	Leederville Oval (crowd: 7534)
Saturday, 6 June	Perth 10.14 (74)	def. by	East Perth 13.8 (86)	Lathlain Park (crowd: 4038)
Saturday, 6 June	South Fremantle 16.19 (115)	def.	Claremont 13.17 (95)	Fremantle Oval (crowd: 9920)
Saturday, 6 June	Subiaco 14.13 (97)	def.	East Fremantle 14.5 (89)	Subiaco Oval (crowd: 4122)
The absence of Les Fong and Cory Bewick from the forward line allows Swans defender Craig Holden to dominate West Perth's attack. Backed up by a magnificent effort in atrocious conditions upfield (led by Neesham and Blackaby) Swans hold West Perth to the lowest score of the season.; Maurice Rioli's wet-weather skill and a better-suited forward line for the wet conditions – with Hardie and Monteath kicking four goals each – allows South Fremantle to come from ten points down early in the last quarter to a twenty-point win.

=== Round 10 ===
	Round 10
Saturday, 13 June	Subiaco 15.7 (97)	def. by	Swan Districts 14.18 (102)	Subiaco Oval (crowd: 8236)
Saturday, 13 June	South Fremantle 22.15 (147)	def.	East Perth 11.11 (77)	Fremantle Oval (crowd: 11908)
Saturday, 13 June	Perth 10.14 (74)	def. by	Claremont 23.18 (156)	Lathlain Park (crowd: 5563)
Saturday, 13 June	West Perth 37.17 (239)	def.	East Fremantle 9.7 (61)	Leederville Oval (crowd: 7716)
Gary Buckenara kicks six magnificent goals but a poor second quarter denies Subiaco an upset despite scoring the first six goals of the match.; After a wet-weather debacle the previous week, West Perth's attack led by former Footscray full-forward Phil Bradmore, achieves a club record score (Note: The record score was equalled and the record margin broken in 1987.) and winning margin At one point, West Perth kicked 16.6 (102) without East Fremantle scoring.

=== Round 11 ===
	Round 11
Saturday, 27 June	West Perth 9.13 (67)	def.	Subiaco 9.11 (65)	Leederville Oval (crowd: 7930)
Saturday, 27 June	South Fremantle 30.18 (198)	def.	Perth 10.13 (73)	Fremantle Oval (crowd: 4487)
Saturday, 27 June	East Perth 13.14 (92)	def. by	Claremont 21.17 (143)	Perth Oval (crowd: 7595)
Saturday, 27 June	East Fremantle 10.13 (73)	def. by	Swan Districts 13.13 (91)	East Fremantle Oval (crowd: 4452)
In heavy rain, Perth at one point lead South Fremantle 8.5 (53) to 7.6 (48) before the Bulldogs kick 23.12 (150) to 2.6 (18) for the rest of the game.; In tough conditions, aided by two superb “wrong-foot” kicks from Jager and Menaglio, West Perth come back from 26 points down to win a thriller.

=== Round 12 ===
	Round 12
Saturday, 4 July	Swan Districts 19.20 (134)	def.	South Fremantle 13.8 (86)	Bassendean Oval (crowd: 14600)
Saturday, 4 July	Subiaco 26.14 (170)	def.	East Perth 12.8 (80)	Subiaco Oval (crowd: 7148)
Saturday, 4 July	Claremont 30.19 (199)	def.	West Perth 20.9 (129)	Claremont Oval (crowd: 8922)
Saturday, 4 July	Perth 23.24 (162)	def.	East Fremantle 21.9 (135)	Lathlain Park (crowd: 4091)
With young Laurie Keene kicking nine goals, Subiaco make a charge for fourth place against the struggling Royals, for whom no one does much in attack against Mitch Fussell's speed.

=== Round 13 ===
	Round 13
Saturday, 11 July	South Fremantle 23.20 (158)	def.	Subiaco 10.17 (77)	Fremantle Oval (crowd: 6375)
Saturday, 11 July	West Perth 26.23 (179)	def.	Perth 13.17 (95)	Subiaco Oval (crowd: 3500)
Saturday, 11 July	East Perth 14.13 (97)	def. by	Swan Districts 17.9 (111)	Perth Oval (crowd: 6500)
Saturday, 11 July	Claremont 30.17 (197)	def.	East Fremantle 14.11 (95)	Claremont Oval (crowd: 5183)
Subiaco lose full-back Fussell with a compound left leg fracture and this loss combined with their on-field loss to South Fremantle ends the Lions hopes of a finals berth.

=== Round 14 ===
	Round 14
Saturday, 18 July	West Perth 23.8 (146)	def.	South Fremantle 19.19 (133)	Leederville Oval (crowd: 8205)
Saturday, 18 July	Subiaco 22.17 (149)	def.	Perth 14.8 (92)	Subiaco Oval (crowd: 4289)
Saturday, 18 July	Swan Districts 16.16 (112)	def. by	Claremont 17.12 (114)	Bassendean Oval (crowd: 14019)
Saturday, 18 July	East Fremantle 9.17 (71)	def. by	East Perth 12.11 (83)	East Fremantle Oval (crowd: 4211)
In another superb pressure match, Claremont claim top position by kicking 3.1 (19) to 2.5 (17) against the win after scores were level early in the final quarter.; A brilliant 10 goals without a miss in the last quarter in “unsettled” weather gives West Perth a superb triumph and allows them to hold fourth place.; In a lacklustre game in changeable weather, East Perth come from behind to stay in the battle for fourth position and tailender East Fremantle are luck a $2000 bet was turned down.

=== Round 15 ===
	Round 15
Saturday, 25 July	West Perth 10.10 (70)	def. by	Swan Districts 25.22 (172)	Subiaco Oval (crowd: 12169)
Saturday, 25 July	East Perth 20.16 (136)	def.	Perth 17.8 (110)	Perth Oval (crowd: 4765)
Saturday, 25 July	Claremont 23.22 (160)	def.	South Fremantle 14.25 (109)	Claremont Oval (crowd: 12670)
Saturday, 25 July	East Fremantle 14.9 (93)	def. by	Subiaco 18.19 (127)	East Fremantle Oval (crowd: 3987)
West Perth suffer another big loss to Swan Districts and again fall out of the four. The Cardinals do not goal between the five-minute mark of the opening quarter and the twenty-minute mark of the second as Swans’ waves of speed move down the field to produce eleven of their own.

=== Round 16 ===
	Round 16
Saturday, 1 August	Perth 13.15 (93)	def. by	Swan Districts 18.20 (128)	Lathlain Park (crowd: N/A)
Saturday, 1 August	West Perth 15.9 (99)	def. by	East Perth 25.10 (160)	Leederville Oval (crowd: 11980)
Saturday, 1 August	Subiaco 12.10 (82)	def. by	Claremont 28.13 (181)	Subiaco Oval (crowd: 8348)
Saturday, 1 August	South Fremantle 24.22 (166)	def.	East Fremantle 19.5 (119)	Fremantle Oval (crowd: 6510)
An unfashionable but brilliant centreline and the move of John Hayes to full-forward where he kicks 7.1 (43) allows East Perth to beat finals rival West Perth and move a game plus percentage clear inside the four.

=== Round 17 ===
	Round 17
Saturday, 8 August	Swan Districts 30.17 (197)	def.	Subiaco 10.14 (74)	Bassendean Oval (crowd: 9237)
Saturday, 8 August	East Perth 20.11 (131)	def.	South Fremantle 16.22 (118)	Subiaco Oval (crowd: 11022)
Saturday, 8 August	Claremont 39.20 (254)	def.	Perth 12.9 (81)	Claremont Oval (crowd: 5820)
Saturday, 8 August	East Fremantle 21.17 (143)	def.	West Perth 16.11 (107)	East Fremantle Oval (crowd: 5175)
East Perth's Grant Campbell gives a classic display to lead his team to a 40-point lead at quarter-time before Bulldog ruckman Michael is equally brilliant in a belated charge.; Swan Districts kick 26.13 (169) to 7.7 (49) after quarter-time as the refusal of Subiaco's Neil Taylor to man Phil Narkle allows the latter and his brother to create havoc as Subiaco coach Ken Armstrong makes the mistake of using Douge in the centre.; Claremont kick their highest score, and the highest in the WAFL to that point, to thrash the Demons who kick only 3.5 (23) after half-time.

=== Round 18 ===
	Round 18
Saturday, 15 August	Subiaco 25.13 (163)	def.	West Perth 9.15 (69)	Subiaco Oval (crowd: 4858)
Saturday, 15 August	Perth 18.13 (121)	def.	South Fremantle 15.13 (103)	Lathlain Park (crowd: 4897)
Saturday, 15 August	Claremont 23.24 (162)	def.	East Perth 8.13 (61)	Claremont Oval (crowd: 10172)
Saturday, 15 August	Swan Districts 24.24 (168)	def.	East Fremantle 8.15 (63)	Bassendean Oval (crowd: 6123)
The brilliance of the Krakouer brothers slightly weakens East Perth's hold on fourth position as the Royals score only 3.12 (30) to 20.18 (138) after quarter-time despite Ralph kicking only a single goal.; Without champion Buckenara and arguable “rookie of the year” Ray Reeves, Subiaco settle West Perth's fate for 1981 as they seize the game at the start with Bill Valli returning with great effect.

=== Round 19 ===
	Round 19
Saturday, 22 August	South Fremantle 21.22 (148)	def.	Swan Districts 16.17 (113)	Fremantle Oval (crowd: 12142)
Saturday, 22 August	East Perth 19.14 (128)	def.	Subiaco 16.7 (103)	Perth Oval (crowd: 10220)
Saturday, 22 August	West Perth 12.9 (81)	def. by	Claremont 35.15 (225)	Leederville Oval (crowd: 7145)
Saturday, 22 August	East Fremantle 20.19 (139)	def.	Perth 17.18 (120)	Subiaco Oval (crowd: 3218)
Four opening goals in as many minutes stuns Swans, who suffer their sixth loss in eight matches against South since the start of 1980. Ruckman Michael and half-back Simon Outhwaite dominate for the Bulldogs.; With their win, East Fremantle makes sure Perth would finish bottom of the WA(N)FL ladder for the first time since 1935.; East Perth seal the four with a skilful burst after the seventeen-minute mark of the last quarter, in the process showing the lack of class and anticipation in Subiaco's key forwards.; Claremont became the only WAFL team to win three consecutive games by over 100 points.

=== Round 20 ===
	Round 20
Saturday, 29 August	Subiaco 18.12 (120)	def.	South Fremantle 10.23 (83)	Subiaco Oval (crowd: 7814)
Saturday, 29 August	West Perth 16.19 (115)	def.	Perth 16.15 (111)	Leederville Oval (crowd: 4827)
Saturday, 29 August	Swan Districts 18.14 (122)	def.	East Perth 14.17 (101)	Bassendean Oval (crowd: 12728)
Saturday, 29 August	East Fremantle 7.16 (58)	def. by	Claremont 10.21 (81)	East Fremantle Oval (crowd: 7935)
East Fremantle kick only 1.9 (15) in dry (but windy) conditions after quarter-time, not goalling in the second or third quarters — a first in the WA(N)FL since Subiaco in Round 11 of 1976. Their wasteful short-kicking game allows the Tigers to recover from Old Easts’ ferocious tackling in the first quarter.

=== Round 21 ===
	Round 21
Saturday, 5 September	South Fremantle 40.18 (258)	def.	West Perth 12.6 (78)	Fremantle Oval (crowd: 6157)
Saturday, 5 September	Perth 18.16 (124)	def. by	Subiaco 26.15 (171)	Lathlain Park (crowd: 4984)
Saturday, 5 September	Claremont 22.16 (148)	def.	Swan Districts 20.13 (133)	Claremont Oval (crowd: 18106)
Saturday, 5 September	East Perth 17.15 (117)	def.	East Fremantle 12.10 (82)	Perth Oval (crowd: 5660)
South Fremantle set a still-standing record for the highest score in the WAFL, beating Claremont's record from Round 17. The Bulldogs become the first team to lead by 100 points at half-time in open-age WA(N)FL football.; Despite the early loss of Phil Krakouer and a 35-point deficit midway through the third quarter, Claremont overcome a strong Swan Districts defence for a twelfth straight victory in front of a record Claremont Oval crowd via brilliant running and handball.

== Ladder ==
1981 WAFL ladder
Pos	Team	Pld	W	L	D	PF	PA	PP	Pts
1	Claremont (P)	21	19	2	0	3352	2128	157.5	76
2	Swan Districts	21	16	5	0	3036	2019	150.4	64
3	South Fremantle	21	13	8	0	2942	2400	122.6	52
4	East Perth	21	11	10	0	2425	2523	96.1	44
5	Subiaco	21	9	12	0	2413	2582	93.5	36
6	West Perth	21	8	13	0	2298	2973	77.3	32
7	East Fremantle	21	5	16	0	2156	2837	76.0	20
8	Perth	21	3	18	0	2151	3311	65.0	12

Rules for classification: 1) points; 2) percentage; 3) number of points for.
(P) Premiers

== Finals series ==
=== First semi-final ===
	First semi-final
Saturday, 12 September	South Fremantle 19.14 (128)	def.	East Perth 13.10 (88)	Subiaco Oval (crowd: 32,860)
Despite a heavy knock, Bruce Monteath kicks 6.2 (38) of 6.4 (40) to avoid a potential upset by the Royals. He had no recollection of equalling the WA(N)FL record of nine goals in a final.

=== Second semi-final ===
	Second semi-final
Saturday, 19 September	Claremont 14.24 (108)	def.	Swan Districts 12.9 (81)	Subiaco Oval (crowd: 33,478)
A wayward Claremont win with surprising ease owing to Swan Districts’ roving weakness in windy conditions combined with the overlooked power of Claremont's defence.

=== Preliminary final ===
	Preliminary final
Sunday, 27 September	Swan Districts 15.15 (105)	def. by	South Fremantle 28.10 (178)	Subiaco Oval (crowd: 33,940)
South Fremantle gain the opportunity to defend their 1980 premiership with a brilliant twenty-goal second half after being sixteen points behind late in the second quarter. Rover Noel Carter rivals his last-round eleven-goal display and Monteath is again superb – this time at centre half-forward.

=== Grand Final ===
1981 WAFL Grand Final
Saturday, 3 October	Claremont	def.	South Fremantle	Subiaco Oval (crowd: 50,517)
4.5 (29); 7.7 (49); 11.13 (79); 16.15 (111)	Q1; Q2; Q3; Final	1.3 (9); 7.15 (57); 10.20 (80); 12.24 (96)	Umpires: Ross Capes, Ron Powell; Simpson Medal: Gary Shaw (Claremont); Maurice Rioli (South Fremantle)
Malaxos 5, Blackwell 3, Ralph 3, Daniels, Jimmy Krakouer, Panizza, Shaw, Watson	Goals	Monteath 4, Carter 3, McKay, Hardie, Rioli, Randall, Vasoli
Moss, Phil Krakouer, Shaw, Pearce, Morton, Blackwell, Malaxos, Harper	Best	Rioli, Barrett, Monteath, Carter, Vasoli, Michael
