= 1983 WAFL season =

Australian rules football season

- Teams: 8
- Premiers: Swan Districts; 5th premiership
- Minor premiers: South Fremantle; 9th minor premiership
- Sandover Medallist: John Ironmonger (East Perth); Bryan Cousins (Perth) (Note: Cousins lost on a countback, but was awarded a retrospective Medal in 1997.)
- Bernie Naylor Medallist: Warren Ralph (Claremont)
- Matches played: 88

The 1983 WAFL season was the 99th season of the West Australian Football League in its various incarnations. The season opened on 31 March and concluded on 17 September with the 1983 WAFL Grand Final contested between Claremont and Swan Districts.

South Fremantle, after a disappointing 1982, and Claremont dominated the competition for most of the year before Swans – after a slow start due to numerous injuries with four losses from eight matches – came home very strongly for a second premiership win in a row. East Perth, with a new coach and required to play fourteen men new to league football, missed the finals for only the second time in eighteen seasons and indeed only the fifth since their dynasty between 1956 and 1961, though a reserves premiership after a drawn preliminary final was partial compensation.

The continuing fall in WAFL attendances despite the growth of Perth's metropolitan population, loss of many star players to the VFL, and resultant financial difficulties for all clubs, led the government of Brian Burke to undergo a review of the WAFL's needs, especially club finances and ground leases, but future seasons did not prove the move successful. In an effort to update their images East Fremantle adopted the moniker "Sharks" and West Perth the "Falcons", and despite considerable scepticism both clubs have retained these nicknames to the present. The blue and whites dominated the pre-season and recovered from a very bad start in the home-and-away rounds to reach fourth position in the last round, but were out of their depths against the top three – who lost only three matches to the remaining five teams all season. The Sharks did win the experimental "Emu Export" lightning carnival held at Subiaco Oval on May 14 and 15, which was regarded by the WAFL as a major flop and never repeated.

For the first time the WAFL allowed six home-and-away matches to be played on Sunday and televised direct to Perth viewers, but attendances at these matches were about half what would have happened otherwise and the WAFL abandoned this for the 1984 season.

== Home-and-away season ==
=== Round 1 ===
	Round 1
Saturday, 26 March	Perth 12.11 (83)	def. by	South Fremantle 19.22 (136)	Lathlain Park (crowd: 6798)
Saturday, 26 March	Swan Districts 20.8 (128)	def. by	Claremont 26.12 (168)	Bassendean Oval (crowd: 12452)
Saturday, 26 March	East Fremantle 15.13 (103)	def. by	Subiaco 22.16 (148)	East Fremantle Oval (crowd: 6129)
Sunday, 27 March	West Perth 18.26 (134)	def.	East Perth 17.13 (115)	Leederville Oval (crowd: 13860)
Traditional rivals West and East Perth meet in the first WAFL match to be direct telecast to local areas.; On a hot 35.9 °C (96.6 °F) day, Claremont’s new-look centreline, incorporating former forward Malaxos, runs over Swans in a convincing reversal of the Grand Final.; Subiaco produce surprising form for three quarters against an East Fremantle team who dominated the pre-season – the Lions’ rotation of four ruckmen in the hot conditions works to their advantage and they led by fifty-six points at three-quarter time.

=== Round 2 (Easter weekend) ===
	Round 2
Saturday, 2 April	South Fremantle 18.11 (119)	def.	West Perth 16.8 (104)	Fremantle Oval (crowd: 13077)
Saturday, 2 April	Subiaco 20.18 (138)	def.	Perth 11.14 (80)	Subiaco Oval (crowd: 6818)
Monday, 4 April	East Perth 22.9 (141)	def. by	Swan Districts 23.20 (158)	Perth Oval (crowd: 14160)
Monday, 4 April	Claremont 27.15 (177)	def.	East Fremantle 13.5 (83)	Claremont Oval (crowd: 7474)
Swan Districts steal a high-scoring game from the Royals after having been behind by 21, 29 and 25 points at each change.; Led by brilliant Aboriginal wingman Greg Kelly, Subiaco surpass their 1982 winning tally after two games against a Perth team that wastes the strong breeze in the first and third quarters.

=== Round 3 ===
	Round 3
Saturday, 9 April	Subiaco 9.19 (73)	def. by	South Fremantle 27.22 (184)	Subiaco Oval (crowd: 12653)
Saturday, 9 April	West Perth 22.24 (156)	def.	Perth 14.10 (94)	Leederville Oval (crowd: 7874)
Saturday, 9 April	East Perth 13.8 (86)	def. by	Claremont 23.22 (160)	Perth Oval (crowd: 10970)
Saturday, 9 April	East Fremantle 9.9 (63)	def. by	Swan Districts 18.24 (132)	East Fremantle Oval (crowd: 5827)
Although East Fremantle – led by first-game centre half-forward Ray Sterrett – stay with Swan Districts for a half, the Swans, despite losing Peter Sartori with a finger injury, completely dominate the second half for a third crushing loss by the pre-season pacesetters.; South Fremantle burst the Subiaco "bubble" despite losing in the key forward positions all match, as interchange Chris Stasinowsky kicks an astonishing 11.3 (69) after coming on in a forward pocket midway through the second quarter.

=== Round 4 ===
	Round 4
Saturday, 16 April	West Perth 20.18 (138)	def.	Swan Districts 10.13 (73)	Subiaco Oval (crowd: 14850)
Saturday, 16 April	Perth 13.15 (93)	def. by	East Perth 18.19 (127)	Lathlain Park (crowd: 5527)
Saturday, 16 April	Claremont 17.15 (117)	def.	Subiaco 15.10 (100)	Claremont Oval (crowd: 6695)
Sunday, 17 April	South Fremantle 24.16 (160)	def.	East Fremantle 14.9 (93)	Fremantle Oval (crowd: 9972)
After being two points down early in the third quarter, South Fremantle kick the next nine goals for a win the makes a mockery of East Fremantle’s new image.; Swan Districts play so poorly, scoring only 3.7 (25) to 14.15 (99) after the seventeen-minute mark of the second quarter, that coach John Todd withdraws the $7200 payment for the match.; Young, tall and hard-working ruckman Laurie Keene nearly leads Subiaco to a huge upset over unbeaten Claremont, but lack of speed in the forward line proves too much of a stumbling block.

=== Round 5 ===
	Round 5
Saturday, 23 April	Swan Districts 21.18 (144)	def.	Subiaco 17.8 (110)	Bassendean Oval (crowd: 8820)
Saturday, 23 April	East Perth 19.14 (128)	def. by	South Fremantle 28.14 (182)	Perth Oval (crowd: 9027)
Saturday, 23 April	West Perth 11.8 (74)	def. by	Claremont 22.15 (147)	Subiaco Oval (crowd: 15784)
Saturday, 23 April	East Fremantle 19.22 (136)	def.	Perth 10.11 (71)	East Fremantle Oval (crowd: 4973)
South Fremantle kick 12.4 (76) to 3.4 (22) after scores were level at three-quarter time to stay unbeaten in Bruce Monteath’s 100th match for them. Monteath kicks four of their final-quarter goal spree.; Although Ralph finished with 11.6 (72), it is Claremont’s solid, risk-free defence that wins the kudos for a fine victory over the new-look West Perth in perfect weather for high scoring.

=== Round 6 ===
	Round 6
Saturday, 30 April	South Fremantle 24.22 (166)	def.	Swan Districts 13.18 (96)	Fremantle Oval (crowd: 14126)
Saturday, 30 April	Subiaco 12.17 (89)	def. by	East Perth 19.13 (127)	Subiaco Oval (crowd: 7520)
Saturday, 30 April	Perth 15.14 (104)	def. by	Claremont 17.18 (120)	Lathlain Park (crowd: 4027)
Saturday, 30 April	West Perth 19.15 (129)	def. by	East Fremantle 19.19 (133)	Leederville Oval (crowd: 6839)
A superb opening quarter in front of a packed crowd turns an eagerly-awaited match into a procession. South Fremantle centreman Brad Hardie has 29 kicks and scores 5.5 (35).; Allen Daniels proves the barrier to a huge upset by winless Perth, with six kicks in fifteen minutes of the final quarter after the Demons come within four points.

=== Round 7 ===
	Round 7
Saturday, 7 May	West Perth 17.18 (120)	def.	Subiaco 9.19 (73)	Leederville Oval (crowd: 6480)
Saturday, 7 May	Swan Districts 17.25 (127)	def.	Perth 15.13 (103)	Bassendean Oval (crowd: 6127)
Saturday, 7 May	Claremont 17.10 (112)	def.	South Fremantle 15.16 (106)	Claremont Oval (crowd: 18268)
Saturday, 7 May	East Perth 31.18 (204)	def.	East Fremantle 18.12 (120)	Subiaco Oval (crowd: 6813)
A record Claremont Oval crowd sees Claremont win the battle of the unbeaten teams owing to some imaginative coaching from Graham Moss. The scoreline is misleading as South Fremantle were never within thirteen points between early in the first quarter and time-on in the last.; After a "basketball-like" first quarter with sixteen goals scored, East Perth – led by the unstoppable Ironmonger – take complete control for a record score against East Fremantle.

=== Emu Export Lightning Cup ===
==== First round ====
Winning team	Winning team score	Losing team	Losing team score	Ground	Crowd	Date
East Fremantle	11.5 (71)	East Perth	0.5 (5)	Subiaco Oval	7950	Saturday, 14 May
Perth	4.3 (27)	Subiaco	1.5 (11)	Subiaco Oval	7950	Saturday, 14 May
East Perth	7.3 (45)	West Perth	6.5 (41)	Subiaco Oval	7950	Saturday, 14 May
East Fremantle	9.6 (60)	Claremont	5.5 (35)	Subiaco Oval	7950	Saturday, 14 May
South Fremantle	8.5 (53)	Perth	5.0 (30)	Subiaco Oval	7950	Saturday, 14 May
Swan Districts	8.7 (55)	Subiaco	6.2 (38)	Subiaco Oval	7950	Saturday, 14 May
Claremont	8.4 (52)	West Perth	3.6 (24)	Subiaco Oval	7950	Saturday, 14 May
Swan Districts	6.8 (44)	South Fremantle	1.7 (13)	Subiaco Oval	7950	Saturday, 14 May

==== Second round ====
Winning team	Winning team score	Losing team	Losing team score	Ground	Crowd	Date
South Fremantle	6.5 (41)	Subiaco	5.2 (32)	Subiaco Oval	3870	Sunday, 15 May
Claremont	12.6 (78)	East Perth	4.3 (27)	Subiaco Oval	3870	Sunday, 15 May
East Fremantle	5.9 (39)	West Perth	6.2 (38)	Subiaco Oval	3870	Sunday, 15 May
Swan Districts	2.12 (24)	Perth	2.7 (19)	Subiaco Oval	3870	Sunday, 15 May

==== Final ====
	Emu Export Loans Lightning Premiership Final
Sunday, 15 May	East Fremantle 9.10 (64)	def.	Swan Districts 6.14 (50)	Subiaco Oval (crowd: 3870)
East Fremantle take their first title since 1979 in an experimental series regarded as a flop, with the crowd in dry weather less than half that observed in damp conditions the preceding day.

=== Round 8 ===
	Round 8
Saturday, 21 May	South Fremantle 26.18 (174)	def.	Perth 12.18 (90)	Fremantle Oval (crowd: 6536)
Saturday, 21 May	East Perth 19.18 (132)	def.	West Perth 10.9 (69)	Perth Oval (crowd: 13343)
Saturday, 21 May	Subiaco 18.10 (118)	def. by	East Fremantle 19.18 (132)	Subiaco Oval (crowd: 5027)
Sunday, 22 May	Claremont 24.17 (161)	def.	Swan Districts 18.19 (127)	Claremont Oval (crowd: 6597)
Peter Dawson, aged twenty-four, and sixteen-year-old Richard Dennis emerge as a top wing duo as fierce tackling aids East Perth to dominate both the centreline and the Falcons.; Warren Ralph’s 10.4 (64) wins a superb-quality Sunday game against a depleted Swan Districts team, led by strongman Ron Boucher, who picks off the "man of the match awards" but cannot by himself contain the Tigers.

=== Round 9 ===
	Round 9
Saturday, 28 May	South Fremantle 22.16 (148)	def.	West Perth 16.16 (112)	Subiaco Oval (crowd: 11420)
Saturday, 28 May	Swan Districts 26.20 (176)	def.	East Perth 19.16 (130)	Bassendean Oval (crowd: 13127)
Saturday, 28 May	Perth 29.15 (189)	def.	Subiaco 19.7 (121)	Lathlain Park (crowd: 4130)
Saturday, 28 May	East Fremantle 24.18 (162)	def.	Claremont 19.15 (129)	East Fremantle Oval (crowd: 6813)
The "old firm" of Stephen Michael and Noel Carter – the latter now playing in the centre – drives South Fremantle to victory and top position with seven of the last nine goals after West Perth draw close.; East Fremantle via sheer enthusiasm and pressure outplay the previously unbeaten Tigers in every department to issue a strong challenge to West Perth, East Perth and Swan Districts for a place in the four.; In their first victory for the season, Perth kick their highest-ever score against Subiaco.

=== Round 10 (Foundation Day) ===
	Round 10
Monday, 6 June	West Perth 15.21 (111)	def. by	Swan Districts 16.18 (114)	Leederville Oval (crowd: 11728)
Monday, 6 June	East Perth 22.21 (153)	def.	Perth 10.12 (72)	Perth Oval (crowd: 5840)
Monday, 6 June	Subiaco 14.15 (99)	def. by	Claremont 24.10 (154)	Subiaco Oval (crowd: 4791)
Monday, 6 June	East Fremantle 19.13 (127)	def. by	South Fremantle 18.20 (128)	East Fremantle Oval (crowd: 17560)
The move of Graeme Comerford from full-forward to centre half-forward, where he kicks 7.1 (43) against State star Murray Rance, would have brought the Falcons a crucial victory but for very poor kicking in front of goal.; In the first one-point result in WAFL for three seasons, East Fremantle, with seventeen fit players, just fail to hold off the pacesetters. Second-game future St. Kilda star Nicky Winmar kicks three decisive last-quarter goals.

=== Round 11 ===
	Round 11
Saturday, 11 June	South Fremantle 26.29 (185)	def.	Subiaco 9.4 (58)	Fremantle Oval (crowd: 5950)
Saturday, 11 June	Perth 21.14 (140)	def. by	West Perth 27.11 (173)	Subiaco Oval (crowd: 5009)
Saturday, 11 June	Claremont 13.9 (87)	def. by	East Perth 18.16 (124)	Claremont Oval (crowd: 9837)
Saturday, 11 June	Swan Districts 30.15 (195)	def.	East Fremantle 15.11 (101)	Bassendean Oval (crowd: 10960)
East Perth produce a fine display against Claremont – avoiding the fadeouts that had plagued their previous games against the top three.; Swan Districts kick a club record score against East Fremantle with a completely dominant first half as their centreline of Leon Baker, Mike Smith and Phil Narkle completely dominates what the ABC called, in analogy with a partial solar eclipse in Perth, a "total eclipse of the Sharks".; South Fremantle’s thrashing of Subiaco leads the Lions to sack coach Peter Daniel after only eleven games. Replacement Brian Fairclough lasts only ten games himself.

=== Round 12 ===
	Round 12
Saturday, 18 June	Subiaco 12.19 (91)	def. by	Swan Districts 13.25 (103)	Subiaco Oval (crowd: 4423)
Saturday, 18 June	West Perth 9.14 (68)	def. by	Claremont 18.16 (124)	Leederville Oval (crowd: 8275)
Saturday, 18 June	Perth 18.16 (124)	def. by	East Fremantle 18.23 (131)	Lathlain Park (crowd: 3670)
Sunday, 19 June	South Fremantle 16.23 (119)	def.	East Perth 11.14 (80)	Fremantle Oval (crowd: 6583)
Rain and gloom late in the match seem to produce a lapse among the Perth players, who miss a rare win in a match where for three quarters East Fremantle were lucky to stay in striking distance.

=== Round 13 ===
	Round 13
Saturday, 25 June	Swan Districts 18.19 (127)	def.	South Fremantle 10.15 (75)	Bassendean Oval (crowd: 14760)
Saturday, 25 June	Subiaco 20.7 (127)	def.	East Perth 15.11 (101)	Subiaco Oval (crowd: 4633)
Saturday, 25 June	Claremont 22.16 (148)	def.	Perth 15.10 (100)	Claremont Oval (crowd: 3771)
Saturday, 25 June	East Fremantle 16.8 (104)	def.	West Perth 15.11 (101)	East Fremantle Oval (crowd: 5810)
The reigning premiers achieve their best and most important victory of the season in slippery, windy conditions as their pressure disorganises the dangerous Bulldog forwards.; Clinton Brown, with ten goals in difficult conditions – one via a superb "wrong-side" shot from the boundary – leads Subiaco to their first win since 2 April, and leaves East Perth in the four only by percentage.

=== Round 14 ===
	Round 14
Saturday, 2 July	Subiaco 17.10 (112)	def.	West Perth 15.18 (108)	Subiaco Oval (crowd: 7060)
Saturday, 2 July	Perth 17.14 (116)	def. by	Swan Districts 23.15 (153)	Lathlain Park (crowd: 5697)
Saturday, 2 July	South Fremantle 17.12 (114)	def.	Claremont 16.13 (109)	Fremantle Oval (crowd: 13975)
Saturday, 2 July	East Perth 17.16 (118)	def.	East Fremantle 15.20 (110)	Perth Oval (crowd: 8137)
In the "best and toughest" match so far in 1983, South Fremantle gain a starling last-minute win over a depleted and inaccurate Claremont team.; A thrilling contest filled with desperation and toughness leaves East Perth a game and 21.5 percent clear in fourth position as East Fremantle’s inaccuracy during a dominant third quarter proves critical.; West Perth coach Dennis Cometti is left ruing a fourth straight loss that leaves his team two games out of the four. Subiaco’s spearheads – a major weakness in recent seasons – win for them as Clint Brown and Brain McFaull boot nine goals between them whereas the Falcons lack a dominant player in attack.

=== Round 15 ===
	Round 15
Saturday, 9 July	Perth 12.12 (84)	def. by	South Fremantle 12.16 (88)	Lathlain Park (crowd: 4359)
Saturday, 9 July	West Perth 6.12 (48)	def. by	East Perth 17.12 (114)	Leederville Oval (crowd: 7332)
Saturday, 9 July	Swan Districts 14.10 (94)	def.	Claremont 8.16 (64)	Bassendean Oval (crowd: 10183)
Saturday, 9 July	East Fremantle 19.26 (140)	def.	Subiaco 8.11 (59)	East Fremantle Oval (crowd: 4414)
West Perth, who fail to goal after the fifteen-minute mark of the second quarter as future Collingwood star Michael Christian uses "spoiling" tactics to devastating effect, are virtually out of the running with their tenth defeat in twelve matches.; The Falcons are the first WAFL team goalless for a half of football since East Fremantle in the second and third quarters in the penultimate round of 1981, and the first goalless in the second half since Swan Districts against East Perth in Round 19 of 1975.

=== State of Origin match ===
Western Australia vs Victoria
Tuesday, 12 July	Western Australia	def.	Victoria	Subiaco Oval (crowd: 44,213)
5.6 (36); 6.13 (49); 11.19 (85); 16.22 (118)	Q1; Q2; Q3; Final	5.4 (34); 10.9 (69); 13.15 (93); 16.19 (115)	Umpires: Michael Ball, Kevin Smith; Simpson Medal: Maurice Rioli
Buckenara 7.1; Taylor 2.4; Ralph 2.2; Sidebottom 1.3; Johnson 1.1; Richardson, Blackwell, Michael 1.0; Buhagiar 0.4; Rioli 0.2; Rance, Panizza, Bosustow 0.1	Goals	3.2 Wallace; 3.1 Lee; 2.1 Knights, Madden; 1.1 Weightman, Daniher; 1.0 Johnston, Royal, Watson, Flower; 0.2 Tuck; 0.1 Raines, Cunningham, Greene, Conlan
Western Australia win the title of Australian football champions and leave Victoria winless for the first time via a stirring comeback win led by seven-goal Hawthorn star Buckenara.

=== Round 16 ===
	Round 16
Saturday, 16 July	East Perth 14.15 (99)	def. by	Swan Districts 20.26 (146)	Perth Oval (crowd: 13931)
Saturday, 16 July	Subiaco 13.10 (88)	def. by	Perth 19.20 (134)	Subiaco Oval (crowd: 3903)
Saturday, 16 July	Claremont 26.22 (178)	def.	East Fremantle 12.9 (81)	Claremont Oval (crowd: 7963)
Sunday, 17 July	South Fremantle 16.17 (113)	def.	West Perth 13.13 (91)	Fremantle Oval (crowd: 8010)
After ruckman Baden Harper adjusts his back brace, Claremont become unstoppable in a game thought by critics as tough for them to win, scoring 20.7 (127) after half-time despite rain in the final quarter.

=== Round 17 ===
	Round 17
Saturday, 23 July	Subiaco 14.15 (99)	def. by	South Fremantle 27.18 (180)	Subiaco Oval (crowd: 4727)
Saturday, 23 July	West Perth 12.14 (86)	def.	Perth 11.17 (83)	Leederville Oval (crowd: 4935)
Saturday, 23 July	East Perth 8.7 (55)	def. by	Claremont 20.19 (139)	Perth Oval (crowd: 9436)
Saturday, 23 July	East Fremantle 8.8 (56)	def. by	Swan Districts 13.22 (100)	East Fremantle Oval (crowd: 7810)
Swan Districts win their ninth consecutive match with a relentless display into a northerly gale during the first quarter and three brilliant long goals after the Sharks looked like holding them out during most of the second stanza.; Claremont’s remarkable tally of 166 handballs – 21 from Wayne Blackwell – bewilders East Perth in the very windy conditions and shows severe weaknesses in the Royals’ running game.

=== Round 18 ===
	Round 18
Saturday, 30 July	Perth 21.16 (142)	def.	East Perth 17.9 (111)	Lathlain Park (crowd: 5237)
Saturday, 30 July	Claremont 37.19 (241)	def.	Subiaco 11.9 (75)	Claremont Oval (crowd: 4210)
Saturday, 30 July	South Fremantle 21.22 (148)	def.	East Fremantle 11.10 (76)	Fremantle Oval (crowd: 12730)
Sunday, 31 July	Swan Districts 18.19 (127)	def.	West Perth 15.14 (104)	Bassendean Oval (crowd: 9211)
Swan Districts record their tenth consecutive victory against an inspired West Perth in Les Fong’s two hundredth match. The Falcons match the pacesetters for three quarters before Swans’ greater class decides.; Warren Ralph kicks sixteen goals, two behinds – the most goals in a WA(N)FL match since Bernie Naylor’s record 23-goal haul in 1953 against Subiaco – for Claremont as the Tigers just fail to break their record for the highest WAFL first quarter and match scores.; Perth produce their first win against a team other than Subiaco since the corresponding round of 1981 by beating East Perth at that club’s own game of strength and persistence. Cousins, Yorgey and Cam Shepard dominate for the Demons.

=== Round 19 ===
	Round 19
Saturday, 6 August	Swan Districts 26.22 (178)	def.	Subiaco 5.8 (38)	Bassendean Oval (crowd: 3980)
Saturday, 6 August	East Perth 15.11 (101)	def. by	South Fremantle 24.11 (155)	Perth Oval (crowd: 8818)
Saturday, 6 August	Claremont 26.13 (169)	def.	West Perth 16.13 (109)	Claremont Oval (crowd: 6858)
Saturday, 6 August	East Fremantle 21.20 (146)	def.	Perth 15.21 (111)	East Fremantle Oval (crowd: 5052)
East Perth president Mal Atwell protests at Mal Brown’s spitting on an East Perth member after an incident during the opening quarter between Bulldog Stephen Michael and Royal David Morgan.; Subiaco, thrashed by Swans, kick the lowest score in the WAFL since 1980, and in fact the lowest by any visiting team at Bassendean until Peel kicked 4.6 (30) in Round 12 of 2003.

=== Round 20 ===
	Round 20
Saturday, 13 August	South Fremantle 18.25 (133)	def.	Swan Districts 11.23 (89)	Fremantle Oval (crowd: 15290)
Saturday, 13 August	East Perth 22.18 (150)	def.	Subiaco 9.12 (66)	Perth Oval (crowd: 3257)
Saturday, 13 August	Perth 8.15 (63)	def. by	Claremont 21.17 (143)	Lathlain Park (crowd: 3800)
Saturday, 13 August	West Perth 11.13 (79)	def. by	East Fremantle 16.17 (113)	Leederville Oval (crowd: 6375)
An influenza epidemic depletes Swan Districts and the Bulldogs finish their home season unbeaten despite having one goal and fourteen behinds on the board at one stage of the second quarter – they compensated with eight straight goals into the wind during the final stanza.; Despite being without skipper Alexander, Kevin Taylor and Rod Lester-Smith, East Fremantle gained a third and most critical win over West Perth to set up a last-round "mini-elimination final" with perennial finalists East Perth.

=== Round 21 ===
	Round 21
Saturday, 20 August	Subiaco 15.15 (105)	def. by	West Perth 16.20 (116)	Subiaco Oval (crowd: 3320)
Saturday, 20 August	Swan Districts 25.21 (171)	def.	Perth 14.8 (92)	Bassendean Oval (crowd: 4217)
Saturday, 20 August	Claremont 21.12 (138)	def.	South Fremantle 15.19 (109)	Claremont Oval (crowd: 13810)
Saturday, 20 August	East Fremantle 19.16 (130)	def.	East Perth 12.9 (81)	East Fremantle Oval (crowd: 14924)
Skill and enthusiasm – compared by football writers with a similar win against West Perth in the final round of 1961 – allow East Fremantle to enter the top four for the first time in 1983. Shane Ellis is unbeatable for the Sharks in defence.; Claremont’s greater speed ensures a comfortable win in the second semi-final preview and creates sizeable worries for a South Fremantle team that previously felt itself coasting towards a premiership.; East Perth fails to qualify for the finals for the first time since 1974 and only the second since 1965. In the process East Fremantle break their first run of ten consecutive losses against one opponent since 1909 and only the second ever.

== Ladder ==
1983 WAFL ladder
Pos	Team	Pld	W	L	D	PF	PA	PP	Pts
1	South Fremantle	21	18	3	0	2922	2070	141.2	72
2	Claremont	21	17	4	0	2985	2061	144.8	68
3	Swan Districts (P)	21	16	5	0	2758	2260	122.0	64
4	East Fremantle	21	10	11	0	2340	2690	87.0	40
5	East Perth	21	9	12	0	2477	2522	98.2	36
6	West Perth	21	7	14	0	2230	2452	90.9	28
7	Subiaco	21	4	17	0	1987	2986	66.5	16
8	Perth	21	3	18	0	2168	2826	76.7	12

Rules for classification: 1) points; 2) percentage; 3) number of points for.
(P) Premiers

== Finals ==
=== First semi-final ===
	First semi-final
Saturday, 27 August	Swan Districts 21.25 (151)	def.	East Fremantle 13.14 (92)	Subiaco Oval (crowd: 23,345)
East Fremantle, who finished six games behind the top three and were without Kevin Taylor and first-year future West Coast star Michael Brennan, were never in the hunt after kicking into the breeze upon winning the toss in what turned out a "forgettable" match.

=== Second semi-final ===
	Second semi-final
Saturday, 3 September	South Fremantle 14.26 (110)	def. by	Claremont 20.11 (131)	Subiaco Oval (crowd: 22,947)
South’s inaccuracy – going from 4.2 (26) to 4.14 (38) during the second quarter – ruins a superb comeback in wet and windy conditions after half-time.; The Bulldogs reduced a sixty-six point deficit to ten points before Claremont steady. South had more possession but wasted chances despite Bruce Monteath kicking 6.7 (43) in a superb display at full-forward.

=== Preliminary final ===
	Preliminary final
Saturday, 10 September	South Fremantle 15.11 (101)	def. by	Swan Districts 26.19 (175)	Subiaco Oval (crowd: 33,585)
Swan Districts produced a flawless team display to thrash a South Fremantle team whose lack of pace tells under the pressure on a warm day. It was the Swans’ first-ever finals win over South Fremantle.

=== Grand Final ===
1983 WAFL Grand Final
Saturday, 17 September	Claremont	def. by	Swan Districts	Subiaco Oval (crowd: 47,760)
1.5 (11); 5.7 (37); 9.8 (62); 12.11 (83)	Q1; Q2; Q3; Final	3.3 (21); 9.6 (60); 13.12 (90); 15.14 (104)	Umpires: Mike Ball, David Rowe; Simpson Medal: Brad Shine (Swan Districts)
Ralph 3, Larry Kickett, Burns, Blackwell, Brett Farmer, Mitchell, Malaxos, Daniel, Watson, Pearce	Goals	Sartori 3, Baker 2, Shine 2, Holmes 2, Cransberg, Langsford, Skwrowski, Smith, Nowotny, Phil Narkle
Moss, Aitken, Michael O'Connell, Kickett, Watson, Reynolds	Best	Sartori, Langsford, Shine, Rance, Skwrowski, Cransberg, Solin, Phil Narkle
Swans produce another fine team effort to win their second consecutive premiership and send retiring veteran Stan Nowotny out on a high note.
