= Michael Aitken =

Australian rules footballer

Personal information
- Full name: Michael James Aitken
- Born: 12 January 1960 (age 66)
- Original team: Claremont
- Height: 187 cm (6 ft 2 in)
- Weight: 83 kg (183 lb)

Playing career^{1}
| Years | Club | Games (Goals) |
| 1979–1984 | Claremont | 95 (20) |
| 1985 | Carlton | 1 (0) |
- ^{1} Playing statistics correct to the end of 1985.

Career highlights
- WAFL Grand Final winner: 1981

Michael James Aitken (born 12 January 1960) is a former Australian rules footballer who played with Claremont in the West Australian Football League (WAFL) and Carlton in the Victorian Football League (VFL).

Aitken made his senior debut in 1979 and played a total of 95 WAFL games and five AFC night series games for Claremont. He played in their successful 1981 WAFL grand final as well as their grand final losses in 1982 and 1983. He played two state games and one state of origin game for Western Australia in 1983 and 1984. He then moved to Melbourne to play for Carlton in 1985. He struggled to break into their senior team, only playing a single game mid year. He continued to play in their reserves team, winning the reserves premiership in 1986. He then retired to focus on becoming a doctor. Despite this, he was included on Carlton's list of three players available to be recruited by the new Brisbane Bears expansion team.

He studied medicine at University of Western Australia whilst playing for Claremont and has since become an obstetrician/gynaecologist. His father Don Aitken played 40 games for Swan Districts in the WAFL.
