= Steve Malaxos =

Australian rules footballer (born 1961)

Personal information
- Full name: Stephen Malaxos
- Born: 19 June 1961 (age 65)
- Original team: Claremont
- Height: 177 cm (5 ft 10 in)
- Weight: 87 kg (192 lb)

Playing career^{1}
Years	Club	Games (Goals)
1979–1984, 1986, 1990–1991	Claremont (WAFL)	140 (295)
1985	Hawthorn	9 (15)
1987–1990	West Coast	66 (30)
1992–1998	East Fremantle (WAFL)	138 (70)
Total		353 (410)

Representative team honours
Years	Team	Games (Goals)
1982–1992	Western Australia	10 (9)

International team honours
1984–1990	Australia	9
- ^{1} Playing statistics correct to the end of 1998.

Career highlights
- Claremont premiership side 1981; E. B. Cook Medal 1983, 1984; Western Australian Sports Star of the Year 1984; Sandover Medal 1984; West Coast Club Champion: 1987; All-Australian team 1986, 1988; West Coast Eagles captain 1990; Lynn Medal 1991, 1994, 1995; East Fremantle premiership side 1992, 1994; Western Australian Football Hall of Fame 2005

Stephen Malaxos (born 19 June 1961) is a former Australian rules footballer and coach from Western Australia. While playing for Claremont in the West Australian Football League (WAFL), he won the 1984 Sandover Medal. Malaxos was an All-Australian with Claremont in 1986 and while he was with the West Coast Eagles in 1988. He was the inaugural fairest and best player at West Coast (1987), holds the Eagles' record for the most possessions in a game (48) and captained the club in 1990.

Malaxos was the head coach at East Fremantle, after successfully coaching the colts team to a premiership in 2010. In 2005, he was inducted into the Western Australian Football Hall of Fame.

== Playing career ==
Malxos attended Hollywood Senior High School and trained with the Claremont colts in 1977 playing for both the club and his school.

He began his senior career as a forward in 1979, with Claremont, and helped the Tigers rise to power at the beginning of the 1980s. In 1981, Claremont broke scoring records week after week on their way to their first WA(N)FL premiership since 1964, and Malaxos' crumbing was the perfect foil to Warren Ralph. Despite missing a quarter of the season though injury, Malaxos kicked 82 goals and during 1982 was widely tipped to be the second non-full forward to top the century after Kevin Taylor in 1979 – though he finished nine goals short.

During 1983, Malaxos was shifted onto the ball to cope with losses to the VFL. The move was a resounding success as he won the club trophy in both 1983 and 1984, becoming Western Australian Sports Star of the Year in 1984, after winning the Sandover.

Malaxos was recruited by Hawthorn in the VFL for the following season. He went to Glenferrie Oval as the all-Australian captain, but struggled for an opportunity in the powerful Hawks line-up. Malaxos was a Reserves and night series premiership player with the Hawks, but returned to Claremont at the end of the season after playing only nine senior games.

At the end of the 1986 season, West Coast, who were due to enter the VFL competition for the 1987 season, added Malaxos to their inaugural list. The Eagles were required to pay the Hawks a $35,000 clearance fee. In Malaxos' inaugural season at West Coast he played 21 games; in round 22, against St. Kilda, he collected his record of 48 possessions.

In 1990, Malaxos played 20 games during the home-and-away season, including the club's historic drawn qualifying final against Collingwood, and the replay a week later. Despite being captain, Malaxos was dropped for the remaining finals matches, and replaced as captain by John Worsfold. He did not add to his total of 66 games for West Coast, but was on the club's list for the 1991 season.

During 1991, he played his 150th game with Claremont, which included 11 pre-season/night series games. In 1992, he transferred to East Fremantle, where he would spend the rest of his career: he would win three club fairest and best awards with the Sharks, and play in premiership sides in 1992 and 1994.

== Post playing ==
In 1999, Malaxos was appointed as coach of the Sydney Swans reserves team in the AFL. In 2004, Malaxos was appointed to an assistant coach's position with Fremantle in the AFL, a position he left in 2009.

Malaxos was inducted into the Western Australian Football Hall of Fame in 2005.

He now is senior coach of the Scotch College First XVIII Australian Rules Football team in Western Australia.

== Other matches ==
Malaxos also played 23 pre-season/night series matches - 11 for Claremont, three for Hawthorn and nine for West Coast (these are counted as senior by the WAFL but not the VFL/AFL) - 10 matches in State of Origin football for Western Australia, and nine International Rules matches for Australia. If these are considered, Malaxos played 395 senior career matches.

The VFL/AFL lists Malaxos' total as 383, excluding his pre-season/night series matches for Hawthorn and West Coast.

Malaxos' West Australian senior career games total of 374 (using either the VFL/AFL's West Australian total or the WAFC's total that excludes his International Rules matches) or 383 (using his overall total) were behind only Mel Whinnen at his retirement.

== Sources ==
- Holmesby, Russell & Main, Jim (2007). The Encyclopedia of AFL Footballers. 7th ed. Melbourne: Bas Publishing.
