= Warren Ralph =

Australian rules footballer (1959–2025)

Personal information
- Full name: Warren James Ralph
- Born: 25 February 1959; Perth
- Died: 23 July 2025 (aged 66); Perth WA
- Original team: Floreat Amateurs (WAAFL)
- Debut: Round 1, 1984, Carlton vs. North Melbourne, at Waverley Park
- Height: 190 cm (6 ft 3 in)
- Weight: 90 kg (198 lb)
- Position: Full forward

Playing career
Years	Club	Games (Goals)
1980–1983, 1987, 1989	Claremont	116 (549)
1984–1986	Carlton	21 (72)
1988	Glenelg	14 (30)
Total		151 (651)

Representative team honours
Years	Team	Games (Goals)
1981–1983	Western Australia	6 (21)

Career highlights
- Claremont premierships: 1981, 1987, 1989; WAFL leading goalkicker: 1981–1983

Warren James Ralph (25 February 1959 – 23 July 2025) was an Australian rules footballer who played during the 1980s with great success as a full-forward for Claremont in the WAFL and with lesser success in the VFL and SANFL.

Ralph began his career at Floreat Park in the WA Amateur Football League. He then played two seasons in the country with Dalwallinu before returning to Floreat, where he also had a considerable reputation in the local cricket competition as a fast bowler before dedicating himself solely to football in 1979.

He debuted for Claremont's league team in 1980 and showed himself to be an extremely potent full-forward in dry conditions: against Perth and Subiaco he kicked totals of 11.6 (72). His performance for the Tigers in wet conditions, against South Fremantle and East Fremantle, suggested that Ralph had limitations. He nevertheless kicked 87 goals and finished with the second highest tally of goals in the WAFL (behind Simon Beasley of Swan Districts). 1981 saw Claremont set numerous scoring records and Ralph emerge as the most potent spearhead in the league with 127 goals for the season, a feat he repeated in 1982 with 115 goals and 1983 with 128 – the highest tally in the WA(N)FL since Austin Robertson's 1968 record.

During this period, Ralph played interstate football for WA six times and kicked 21 goals. He also played in Claremont's 1981 premiership team, in which he kicked three goals, and in their 1982 and 1983 losing Grand Final teams against Swan Districts.

Ralph made his debut for the Carlton Football Club in Round 1 of the 1984 season in the second biggest victory the Blues have ever managed, against 1983 minor premiers North Melbourne. He kicked nine goals in a score of 31.13 (199), and after seven matches had kicked 35 goals; however for the rest of his three seasons at Carlton, injuries and effective strategies by opposing coaches led to him alternating between the seniors and reserves. Nonetheless, Ralph played a sensational game at VFL Park in the 1984 Qualifying Final, where he kicked eight of Carlton's fourteen goals. A knee injury disrupted him early in the 1985 season, and it was not until late in 1986 that Ralph showed any approach to his early promise, kicking twelve goals in the last two home-and-away games against Footscray and Melbourne. However, a poor performance in the Qualifying Final against the Swans saw him play in the Blues' reserves premiership team.

However, Ralph soon had a falling-out with coach Robert Walls and possible clearances to Fitzroy and North Melbourne (for whom Claremont teammates Jimmy and Phil Krakouer played) were refused. Consequently, Ralph returned to Claremont, where in more suitable conditions he showed he had not lost his old touch, playing an important role in Claremont's all-conquering 1987 season with 75 goals including ten in the second semi against Subiaco, equalling Darren Bennett's record from the previous season. Ralph played briefly with Glenelg in 1988, and then returned to Claremont the following season, playing his last match in the Grand Final.
