= 1979 WANFL season =

Australian rules football season

1979 WAFL season
- Teams: 8
- Premiers: East Fremantle; 25th premiership
- Minor premiers: Claremont; 5th minor premiership
- Sandover Medallist: Phil Kelly (East Perth)
- Bernie Naylor Medallist: Kevin Taylor (East Fremantle)
- Matches played: 88

The 1979 WANFL season was the 95th season of the West Australian National Football League in its various incarnations, and the last of forty-nine (including three under-age wartime seasons) under that moniker.

The season set many records for high scoring due to the still-ongoing drying of Perth's climate and the new "interchange" rule. The all-time record aggregate score of 60.18 (378) was set in the third last round between Swan Districts and Subiaco and has never been approached since. However, the overall average score of 112.52 points per team per game was not nearly so high as in the following few years under the "WAFL" moniker.

A major highlight of the 1979 season was the all-time record attendance for local West Australian football of 52,781 in the Grand Final, beating narrowly the previous record of 52,322 set in the 1975 decider.

The 1979 season became a critical turning point in the fortunes of many WANFL clubs. Perth, who had been a powerhouse ever since the end of World War II, winning six premierships and playing in the finals during twenty-four of the preceding thirty-two seasons, underwent a long-term decline that has seen the play in the finals since only in 1986, 1991 and 1997, and take the wooden spoon on eight occasions as opposed to none between 1936 and 1980. With the loss of a number of veterans and major coaching problems which culminated in the resignation of newcomer Percy Johnson for former premiership mentor Graham Campbell, West Perth, also a power club of the WANFL during the third-of-a-century before 1979, declined to their worst record since 1939 with only four wins. The Cardinals (Note: latterly the Falcons) were to remain battlers until the middle 1990s when they moved to Arena Joondalup. On the other hand, the 1979 season saw Claremont and Swan Districts begin revivals after years near the bottom of the ladder that would see them dominate the competition during the 1980s.

== Home-and-away season ==
=== Round 1 ===
	Round 1
Saturday, 31 March	West Perth 15.16 (106)	def.	Subiaco 13.14 (92)	Leederville Oval (crowd: 8105)
Saturday, 31 March	Perth 18.12 (120)	def. by	South Fremantle 17.21 (123)	Lathlain Park (crowd: 10508)
Saturday, 31 March	East Perth 11.13 (79)	def. by	Claremont 14.13 (97)	Perth Oval (crowd: 14976)
Saturday, 31 March	East Fremantle 18.10 (118)	def.	Swan Districts 11.13 (79)	East Fremantle Oval (crowd: 9230)
Perth just fail to clinch game after being behind almost all match against the Bulldogs.; West Perth produce a brilliant third quarter burst to win after looking out of the match at half-time.

=== Round 2 ===
	Round 2
Saturday, 7 April	South Fremantle 17.19 (121)	def.	West Perth 11.10 (76)	Fremantle Oval (crowd: 11637)
Saturday, 7 April	Swan Districts 17.15 (117)	def. by	East Perth 21.8 (134)	Bassendean Oval (crowd: 10930)
Saturday, 7 April	Subiaco 11.9 (75)	def. by	Perth 19.20 (134)	Subiaco Oval (crowd: 5684)
Saturday, 7 April	Claremont 15.11 (101)	def. by	East Fremantle 21.17 (143)	Claremont Oval (crowd: 11978)

=== Round 3 ===
	Round 3
Saturday, 14 April	East Perth 29.22 (196)	def.	Subiaco 6.11 (47)	Perth Oval (crowd: 8528)
Saturday, 14 April	East Fremantle 17.18 (120)	def.	South Fremantle 14.19 (103)	East Fremantle Oval (crowd: 21317)
Monday, 16 April	Perth 11.8 (74)	def. by	Swan Districts 11.12 (78)	Lathlain Park (crowd: 11046)
Monday, 16 April	Claremont 19.25 (139)	def.	West Perth 5.12 (42)	Claremont Oval (crowd: 11284)
A record East Fremantle Oval crowd sees Old Easts come from behind as defenders Crouch and Green along with the following division take complete control.; East Perth record their biggest win in open-age WANFL football, narrowly beating their 147-point win over Claremont from 1958.; Perth coach Ken Armstrong complains about the tactics of rival John Todd after Ron Boucher shatters the jaw of key Demon ruckman and former Simpson Medallist Wim Rosbender without any penalty.; With Phil Krakouer kicking eight goals including Claremont’s first five, and West Perth’s forward line decrepit, the Cardinals enter a severe crisis with a number of injuries.

=== Round 4 ===
	Round 4
Saturday, 21 April	Subiaco 9.11 (65)	def. by	South Fremantle 20.28 (148)	Subiaco Oval (crowd: 5606)
Saturday, 21 April	West Perth 14.15 (99)	def. by	Perth 16.11 (107)	Leederville Oval (crowd: 8786)
Saturday, 21 April	Swan Districts 15.21 (111)	def. by	Claremont 17.15 (117)	Bassendean Oval (crowd: 11080)
Saturday, 21 April	East Fremantle 9.16 (70)	def.	East Perth 8.10 (58)	East Fremantle Oval (crowd: 14676)

=== Round 5 ===
	Round 5
Saturday, 28 April	Swan Districts 31.16 (202)	def.	Subiaco 11.12 (78)	Bassendean Oval (crowd: 6872)
Saturday, 28 April	East Perth 19.15 (129)	def.	Perth 13.13 (91)	Perth Oval (crowd: 12427)
Saturday, 28 April	Claremont 18.12 (120)	def. by	South Fremantle 20.24 (144)	Claremont Oval (crowd: 12640)
Saturday, 28 April	East Fremantle 18.24 (132)	def.	West Perth 17.12 (114)	East Fremantle Oval (crowd: 7930)
With skipper Stan Nowotny and the Narkle brothers killing Subiaco (who had lost their last four matches by 446 points) and their reserves winning equally easily, Swan Districts confirm they would be much more formidable than in 1978 and 1977.

=== Round 6 ===
	Round 6
Saturday, 5 May	West Perth 19.13 (127)	def. by	Swan Districts 21.14 (140)	Leederville Oval (crowd: 11318)
Saturday, 5 May	South Fremantle 20.20 (140)	def.	East Perth 11.18 (84)	Fremantle Oval (crowd: 14129)
Saturday, 5 May	Subiaco 17.11 (113)	def.	Claremont 17.9 (111)	Subiaco Oval (crowd: 5476)
Saturday, 5 May	Perth 15.18 (108)	def.	East Fremantle 13.12 (90)	Lathlain Park (crowd: 11427)
The recruitment of South Fremantle wingman Alan Rose and former East Fremantle player Glen Durnthaler, along with coach Douge blanketing Tiger centre half-back Ken Hunter, toughens Subiaco after their recent disasters to a thrilling first victory.; Injured ruck-rover Gerard Neesham shows courage to lead a final Swan fightback in a fluctuating match.

=== Round 7 ===
	Round 7
Saturday, 12 May	Swan Districts 11.20 (86)	def. by	South Fremantle 21.14 (140)	Bassendean Oval (crowd: 15,170)
Saturday, 12 May	East Perth 21.18 (144)	def.	West Perth 7.10 (52)	Perth Oval (crowd: 11532)
Saturday, 12 May	Claremont 17.12 (114)	def.	Perth 7.11 (53)	Claremont Oval (crowd: 8765)
Saturday, 12 May	East Fremantle 27.21 (183)	def.	Subiaco 8.9 (57)	East Fremantle Oval (crowd: 5610)
Moving himself to centre half-forward, Claremont’s champion ruckman and captain-coach Graham Moss dominates but Perth’s inexperience ruck leads critics to question the viability of the move.; Archie Duda returns for his first game to combine with Paul Arnold for eleven goals and complement a dominating midfield performance by the previously uncertain reigning premiers.

=== Round 8 ===
	Round 8
Saturday, 19 May	Subiaco 18.12 (120)	def.	West Perth 13.17 (95)	Subiaco Oval (crowd: 5310)
Saturday, 19 May	South Fremantle 13.15 (93)	def. by	Perth 16.15 (111)	Fremantle Oval (crowd: 8297)
Saturday, 19 May	Claremont 18.14 (122)	def.	East Perth 9.16 (70)	Claremont Oval (crowd: 9871)
Saturday, 19 May	Swan Districts 20.20 (140)	def. by	East Fremantle 22.16 (148)	Bassendean Oval (crowd: 6985)
Claremont confirm East Perth’s popular premiership favouritism as misplaced via a convincing win with Moss continuing to dominate at centre-half forward and former defender Barry Beecroft doing all that was required in the ruck.; Swan Districts lose despite a 9.10 (64) second quarter and kick their highest losing score until 1982; The return of defender John Dimmer and Dennis Blair allows a still-understrength Subiaco to drop the aging Cardinals to last position.

=== Round 9 ===
	Round 9
Saturday, 26 May	West Perth 8.13 (61)	def. by	South Fremantle 28.19 (187)	Leederville Oval (crowd: 8273)
Saturday, 26 May	East Perth 14.12 (96)	def. by	Swan Districts 18.14 (122)	Perth Oval (crowd: 11870)
Saturday, 26 May	Perth 22.23 (155)	def.	Subiaco 9.7 (61)	Lathlain Park (crowd: 8072)
Saturday, 26 May	East Fremantle 17.18 (120)	def. by	Claremont 21.14 (140)	East Fremantle Oval (crowd: 12382)
South Fremantle dominate over an inept Cardinal team setting numerous records: West Perth’s worst loss, beating 112 points against Perth from 1977.; The Cardinals’ biggest loss at Leederville Oval, beating 89 points against Swan Districts on 12 July 1965; The club sacked its coach the following Monday in favour of old mentor Campbell.

=== Round 10 (Foundation Day) ===
	Round 10
Saturday, 2 June	Swan Districts 15.14 (104)	def.	Perth 10.17 (77)	Bassendean Oval (crowd: 12287)
Saturday, 2 June	West Perth 13.16 (94)	def. by	Claremont 16.10 (106)	Leederville Oval (crowd: 8762)
Monday, 4 June	Subiaco 9.12 (66)	def. by	East Perth 16.21 (117)	Subiaco Oval (crowd: 8213)
Monday, 4 June	South Fremantle 20.30 (150)	def.	East Fremantle 20.15 (135)	Fremantle Oval (crowd: 22399)
High-scoring Foundation Day derby sees inaccurate Bulldogs come from behind to win with 11.7 (73) to 5.4 (34) last quarter and acquire premiership favouritism in front of a record Fremantle Oval attendance – despite East Fremantle being seriously affected by injuries.

=== Round 11 ===
	Round 11
Saturday, 9 June	South Fremantle 27.22 (184)	def.	Subiaco 19.17 (131)	Fremantle Oval (crowd: 4724)
Saturday, 9 June	Perth 25.12 (162)	def.	West Perth 12.15 (87)	Lathlain Park (crowd: 8297)
Saturday, 9 June	Claremont 17.15 (117)	def.	Swan Districts 12.17 (89)	Claremont Oval (crowd: 11575)
Saturday, 9 June	East Perth 25.8 (158)	def.	East Fremantle 18.12 (120)	Perth Oval (crowd: 10368)
West Perth record their tenth consecutive loss, their worst sequence since their record 27-game streak in 1938 and 1939.; Despite a comfortable win with Ray Bauskis kicking a career-best 13.4 (82), South Fremantle coach Mal Brown becomes very upset at a "gutless" final quarter where South kicks only 2.0 (12) to Subiaco’s 7.8 (50).; An unexpected move of brilliant rover-forward Phil Krakouer to defence shuts out the young Swan Districts centreline after Swans get within eight points of the Tigers. Krakouer has an amazing 32 kicks and eight handballs.

=== Round 12 ===
	Round 12
Saturday, 16 June	Subiaco 4.12 (36)	def. by	Swan Districts 21.26 (152)	Subiaco Oval (crowd: 4639)
Saturday, 16 June	Perth 6.10 (46)	def. by	East Perth 10.21 (81)	Lathlain Park (crowd: 8537)
Saturday, 16 June	South Fremantle 16.13 (109)	def.	Claremont 10.10 (70)	Fremantle Oval (crowd: 11897)
Saturday, 16 June	West Perth 12.16 (88)	def.	East Fremantle 10.11 (71)	Leederville Oval (crowd: 5243)
Former coach Campbell’s emphasis on hard work and dedication allows West Perth to end their worst losing run for 40 years and second-worst ever.; East Perth consolidate their place in the top four with a convincing wet-weather repeat of the 1978 Grand Final.

=== Round 13 ===
	Round 13
Saturday, 23 June	Swan Districts 13.20 (98)	def. by	West Perth 15.9 (99)	Bassendean Oval (crowd: 8237)
Saturday, 23 June	East Perth 16.19 (115)	def.	South Fremantle 11.16 (82)	Perth Oval (crowd: 13876)
Saturday, 23 June	Claremont 23.11 (149)	def.	Subiaco 17.21 (123)	Claremont Oval (crowd: 5061)
Saturday, 23 June	East Fremantle 22.14 (146)	def.	Perth 16.11 (107)	East Fremantle Oval (crowd: 6692)
Imaginative use of handball by East Perth’s defenders blunts a South Fremantle attack that had averaged 136 points per match and also set up most Royal goals in an impressive victory for the 1978 premiers.; Rod Alderton, West Perth’s leading goalkicker in 1978, kicks three of seven last-quarter goals in a twenty-minute burst to pip an inaccurate Swan Districts who had led all day but just failed with a late comeback.

=== Round 14 ===
	Round 14
Saturday, 30 June	South Fremantle 19.22 (136)	def.	Swan Districts 18.17 (125)	Fremantle Oval (crowd: 11106)
Saturday, 30 June	West Perth 12.11 (83)	def. by	East Perth 12.19 (91)	Leederville Oval (crowd: 12898)
Saturday, 30 June	Perth 16.14 (110)	def. by	Claremont 21.11 (137)	Lathlain Park (crowd: 8948)
Saturday, 30 June	Subiaco 17.11 (113)	def. by	East Fremantle 17.25 (127)	Subiaco Oval (crowd: 4976)
Although they establish a three-game gap between fourth and fifth, poor defence nearly costs South Fremantle the match, as previously out-of-sorts Simon Beasley kicks nine after being dropped but recalled when Mark Olsen is declared unfit with a calf strain.; Moss returns to the ruck to drive Claremont form 31 points down at half-time to a superb win, with Jimmy Krakouer superb in support.; East Perth kick 3.1 to 2.3 into the breeze to deny Cardinals a third straight victory.

=== Round 15 ===
	Round 15
Saturday, 14 July	West Perth 19.17 (131)	def.	Subiaco 15.7 (97)	Leederville Oval (crowd: 5136)
Saturday, 14 July	Perth 9.10 (64)	def. by	South Fremantle 17.10 (112)	Lathlain Park (crowd: 8000)
Saturday, 14 July	East Perth 16.16 (112)	def. by	Claremont 17.13 (115)	Perth Oval (crowd: 11979)
Saturday, 14 July	East Fremantle 19.21 (135)	def.	Swan Districts 7.11 (53)	East Fremantle Oval (crowd: 6880)
East Fremantle return to their early-season form by crushing Swans on a windy day, finishing with 6.4 (40) to 1.3 (9) into a strong breeze.; Claremont show their traditional "college boy" tag invalid with a fighting win – again led by Moss and the Krakouers – after East Perth score 9.3 (57) with the wind in the third quarter.

=== Round 16 ===
	Round 16
Saturday, 21 July	South Fremantle 18.17 (125)	def.	West Perth 14.17 (101)	Fremantle Oval (crowd: 9828)
Saturday, 21 July	Swan Districts 18.18 (126)	def. by	East Perth 24.15 (159)	Bassendean Oval (crowd: 9937)
Saturday, 21 July	Subiaco 11.23 (89)	def. by	Perth 14.12 (96)	Subiaco Oval (crowd: 3599)
Saturday, 21 July	Claremont 24.19 (163)	def.	East Fremantle 10.17 (77)	Claremont Oval (crowd: 11197)
1976 leading goalkicker Norm Uncle returns after a long period of disappointment to kick nine goals three behinds as Claremont, after losing Moss and Jimmy Krakouer, run over Old Easts in the second half.

=== Round 17 ===
	Round 17
Saturday, 28 July	Perth 15.15 (105)	def. by	Swan Districts 23.14 (152)	Lathlain Park (crowd: 5972)
Saturday, 28 July	East Perth 17.16 (118)	def. by	Subiaco 18.21 (129)	Perth Oval (crowd: 5940)
Saturday, 28 July	Claremont 21.16 (142)	def.	West Perth 12.14 (86)	Claremont Oval (crowd: 8429)
Saturday, 28 July	South Fremantle 17.17 (119)	def. by	East Fremantle 20.22 (142)	Fremantle Oval (crowd: 13127)
Subiaco record upset win with 8.8 (56) to 1.1 (7) opening quarter, and hold on despite kicking 5.11 (41) in the third.

=== Round 18 ===
	Round 18
Saturday, 4 August	Subiaco 12.13 (85)	def. by	South Fremantle 21.12 (138)	Subiaco Oval (crowd: 6193)
Saturday, 4 August	West Perth 10.16 (76)	def. by	Perth 23.13 (151)	Leederville Oval (crowd: 5857)
Saturday, 4 August	Swan Districts 24.12 (156)	def.	Claremont 15.19 (109)	Bassendean Oval (crowd: 10927)
Saturday, 4 August	East Fremantle 13.15 (93)	def. by	East Perth 31.10 (196)	East Fremantle Oval (crowd: 11219)
East Perth set a record for the highest score against East Fremantle, kicking 18.4 (112) in the first half as the celebration of Barry Cable’s 400th game seems to arrive a week too soon as their centreline led by Larry Kickett overwhelms the blue and whites.; Old Easts had only three goalkickers (Thomson 6, Taylor 5, Buhagiar 2).

=== Round 19 ===
	Round 19
Saturday, 11 August	Swan Districts 40.11 (251)	def.	Subiaco 20.7 (127)	Bassendean Oval (crowd: 6990)
Saturday, 11 August	East Perth 23.18 (156)	def.	Perth 13.18 (96)	Perth Oval (crowd: 16167)
Saturday, 11 August	Claremont 18.19 (127)	def.	South Fremantle 12.12 (84)	Claremont Oval (crowd: 14098)
Saturday, 11 August	East Fremantle 32.23 (215)	def.	West Perth 19.12 (126)	East Fremantle Oval (crowd: 5228)
Record aggregate score at Bassendean, with Mark Olsen kicking thirteen and Gary Buckenara nine from an amazing 27 kicks and 17 marks for Subiaco; Aggregate score at East Fremantle remains the third highest on record, with eight more scoring shots than at Bassendean. Taylor kicked nine for Old Easts.; Barry Cable plays his 400th senior game and celebrates with a win over his former club.

=== Round 20 ===
	Round 20
Saturday, 18 August	West Perth 10.8 (68)	def. by	Swan Districts 20.22 (142)	Leederville Oval (crowd: 4730)
Saturday, 18 August	South Fremantle 8.10 (58)	def.	East Perth 7.10 (52)	Fremantle Oval (crowd: 10072)
Saturday, 18 August	Subiaco 19.9 (123)	def. by	Claremont 20.11 (131)	Subiaco Oval (crowd: 4201)
Saturday, 18 August	Perth 8.16 (64)	def. by	East Fremantle 11.6 (72)	Lathlain Park (crowd: 4059)
Bulldogs secure double chance via an efficient display with the wind in the first quarter in the wettest and lowest-scoring game of the season; Subiaco’s failure to hold on in an exceptional quality game against Claremont assures that team of the double chance and the Lions of the wooden spoon.

=== Round 21 ===
	Round 21
Saturday, 25 August	Swan Districts 22.18 (150)	def.	South Fremantle 14.8 (92)	Bassendean Oval (crowd: 14189)
Saturday, 25 August	East Perth 14.11 (95)	def.	West Perth 11.15 (81)	Perth Oval (crowd: 8059)
Saturday, 25 August	Claremont 35.8 (218)	def.	Perth 14.15 (99)	Claremont Oval (crowd: 8146)
Saturday, 25 August	East Fremantle 25.16 (166)	def.	Subiaco 13.8 (86)	East Fremantle Oval (crowd: 5712)
Jimmy Krakouer, cleared of fighting with Lion Durnthaler during the previous game, kicks nine goals and leads a devastating midfield that clinches the minor premiership.; Injuries to Noel Carter and Basil Campbell show up the jitters that had derailed several recent South Fremantle premiership attempts.

== Ladder ==
1979 WANFL ladder
Pos	Team	Pld	W	L	D	PF	PA	PP	Pts
1	Claremont	21	16	5	0	2645	2137	123.8	64
2	South Fremantle	21	15	6	0	2588	2140	120.9	60
3	East Fremantle (P)	21	14	7	0	2623	2323	112.9	56
4	East Perth	21	13	8	0	2440	1953	124.9	52
5	Swan Districts	21	11	10	0	2673	2292	116.6	44
6	Perth	21	8	13	0	2130	2292	92.9	32
7	West Perth	21	4	17	0	1892	2677	70.7	16
8	Subiaco	21	3	18	0	1913	3090	61.9	12

Rules for classification: 1) points; 2) percentage; 3) number of points for.
(P) Premiers

== Finals ==
=== First semi-final ===
	First semi-final
Saturday, 1 September	East Fremantle 19.14 (128)	def.	East Perth 18.18 (126)	Subiaco Oval (crowd: 30,236)
East Fremantle coach Bradley Smith makes a number of surprise moves that overhaul his former club in Cable’s last senior match.

=== Second semi-final ===
	Second semi-final
Saturday, 8 September	Claremont 14.19 (103)	def. by	South Fremantle 17.21 (123)	Subiaco Oval (crowd: 32,046)
Noel Carter makes an unexpected comeback from injury, and with Michael beating Moss, South Fremantle make a surprising rebound from their Swan Districts loss, leaving Claremont as the team with injury worries.

=== Preliminary final ===
	Preliminary final
Saturday, 15 September	Claremont 15.17 (107)	def. by	East Fremantle 19.20 (134)	Subiaco Oval (crowd: 26,469)
Six goals in the first quarter into the wind ensure East Fremantle make the Grand Final and Claremont become the first minor premier to miss the Grand Final since Perth in 1963.; Claremont’s attempt to improve its forward line by displacing Old Easts’ Doug Green fails.

=== Grand Final ===
1979 WANFL Grand Final
Saturday, 22 September	South Fremantle	def. by	East Fremantle	Subiaco Oval (crowd: 52,781)
4.5 (29); 8.10 (58); 14.14 (98); 16.16 (112)	Q1; Q2; Q3; Final	3.5 (23); 10.13 (73); 13.16 (94); 21.19 (145)	Umpires: Ross Capes, John Morris; Simpson Medal: Kevin Taylor (East Fremantle)
Bauskis 5, Vigona 3, Morley 3, Mountain 2 Rioli, Carter, Haddow	Goals	Taylor 7, Turco 4, Thompson 4, Buhagiar 3, Judge, Sims, Sewell
Mountain, Michael, Bauskis, Morley, Cavanagh, Rioli	Best	Buhagiar, Peake, Taylor, D Green, S Green, Carrott
