= Allan Sidebottom =

Australian rules footballer

Personal information
- Full name: Allan Norman Sidebottom
- Born: 1 January 1959 (age 67)
- Original team: Swan Districts (WAFL)
- Draft: No. 2, 1982 interstate draft
- Height: 193 cm (6 ft 4 in)
- Weight: 86 kg (190 lb)

Playing career^{1}
Years	Club	Games (Goals)
1983–1987	St Kilda	55 (18)
1987	Fitzroy	1 (0)
Total		56 (18)
- ^{1} Playing statistics correct to the end of 1987.

Allan Norman Sidebottom (born 1 January 1959) is a former Australian rules footballer who played with St Kilda and Fitzroy in the Victorian Football League (VFL) during the 1980s.

Sidebottom was already 24 when he began his VFL career in 1983, having played for Swan Districts in Western Australia since 1977 and played in their 1982 premiership team. His elder brother, Garry Sidebottom, had also played at Swan Districts before joining St Kilda.

A ruckman, Sidebottom played only nine games in his first season for St Kilda but was a regular fixture in the side the following year after the retirement of Jeff Sarau. He played 21 of a possible 22 games in 1984, took 99 marks, the third most by a St Kilda player and polled well in the 1984 Brownlow Medal count to finish equal eighth.

After making another 17 appearances in 1985, Sidebottom played just eight more games over the next one and a half seasons and midway through crossed to Fitzroy.

Only able to play one senior game for Fitzroy, Sidebottom returned to Swan Districts in 1988 for one final season and retired owing to ankle and back injuries with 98 WAFL games to his name. He had also played a State of Origin match for Western Australia against Victoria back in 1985, sharing the ruck duties with Andrew Purser.
