= Peter Sartori =

Australian rules footballer

Personal information
- Born: 24 October 1964 (age 62); Western Australia
- Original team: Redcliffe
- Debut: Round 1, 1987, Carlton vs. Hawthorn, at Princes Park
- Height: 195 cm (6 ft 5 in)
- Weight: 90 kg (198 lb)

Playing career^{1}
Years	Club	Games (Goals)
1981–1986	Swan Districts	82 (119)
1987–1991	Carlton	54 (119)
1992–1994	Fitzroy	23 (19)
- ^{1} Playing statistics correct to the end of 1994.

Career highlights
- Swan Districts Premiership player: 1983 & 1984

Peter David Sartori (born 24 October 1964) is a former Australian rules football player who played for the Carlton Football Club and the Fitzroy Football Club in the AFL and Swan Districts Football Club in the WAFL throughout the mid to late 1980s and early 1990s.

Sartori commenced his career at Swan Districts in 1981 after being recruited from Redcliffe. He missed the 1982 finals due to a kidney injury sustained at an exhibition game in Esperance midway through the season. He continued playing in 1983 and helped his club win both the 1983 and 1984 Grand Finals playing both as a ruckman and at centre half forward. Sartori left Swan Districts in 1986 after six seasons in which he had played 82 games and kicked 119 goals in the number 15 guernsey.

He joined the Carlton Football Club in 1987, but with Stephen Kernahan and Justin Madden monopolising the centre half-forward and ruck positions, Sartori was used mainly as a full-forward. A long succession of injuries restricted him to 57 games for the Blues, in which he kicked 114 goals. A hamstring injury in 1987 cost him a spot in the 1987 premiership side, but his marking was potent in the 1988 Qualifying Final against arch-rivals Collingwood.

After the 1991 season, Sartori was traded as part of a complex deal to Fitzroy Football Club. He managed to play only 23 games in three seasons after suffering further injuries including a major knee injury in 1992. Sartori finally retired at the end of the 1994 season, with a modest 162 games in thirteen seasons of senior football.
