= Wayne Blackwell =

Australian rules footballer

Personal information
- Born: 30 August 1960 (age 66); Leicester, United Kingdom
- Original team: North Beach / Hale School
- Debut: Round 1 1984, Carlton vs. North Melbourne, at Waverley Park
- Height: 179 cm (5 ft 10 in)
- Weight: 80 kg (176 lb)

Playing career^{1}
Years	Club	Games (Goals)
1978–1983	Claremont	112 (84)
1984–1990	Carlton	110 (80)

Coaching career
Years	Club	Games (W–L–D)
1996–1998	Perth	63 (25–38–0)
2000	East Fremantle	21 (13–8–0)
- ^{1} Playing statistics correct to the end of 2000.

Career highlights
- Claremont premiership side 1981; Western Australia State of Origin representative

Wayne Anthony Blackwell (born 30 August 1960) is a former Australian rules footballer who played for Claremont in the Western Australian National Football League (WANFL) and Carlton in the Victorian Football League (VFL) from 1978 to 1990.

Born in Leicester in England, Wayne Blackwell played his early football in Western Australia and he was a centreman in Claremont's 1981 premiership team. After 112 WANFL games, some as vice-captain, he crossed to Carlton where he was used mostly on the wing and was a member of the side which lost the 1986 VFL Grand Final. Also in 1986 he finished third in the "Best and Fairest" for Carlton. He missed out on playing in their 1987 premiership team due to a knee injury, while a groin injury would force him to retire in 1990.

At interstate level Blackwell was a regular for Western Australia throughout the 1980s and made a total of eight appearances. He is often remembered for a smother in his state's three point win over Victoria at Subiaco in 1986 when he prevented Brian Royal from kicking the winning goal.

His son Luke Blackwell arrived at Carlton under the father-son rule and made his debut in 2006.

== Coaching career ==
After he retired as a player, Wayne Blackwell carved out a career as a coach. He began his coaching career as a playing coach in the Western District of Victoria, taking Portland to a premiership in his first year, and in 1993 coached QAFL team North Brisbane. Returning to his home state in 1995, Blackwell was signed for 1996 by struggling WAFL club Perth - in financial strife and facing potential merger with East Perth or relocation to the Gosnells region - as a successor to former teammate David Glascott. Blackwell took Perth to only its third finals appearance since its halcyon era ended in 1979 during 1997, but in 1998 the Demons fell back to their old ways with only four wins and Blackwell was told he was not wanted for the 1999 season. As of 2013, however, Blackwell remains the last coach to take Perth to a season with more wins than losses or to a finals appearance.

2000 saw Wayne Blackwell take the reins at East Fremantle for one season. Although Blackwell took the Sharks to a Grand Final, after the season he announced that business interests would prevent him coaching a senior WAFL team again. He has however served time in 2005 as an assistant coach at Swan Districts and is currently the colts coach for his old club Claremont.
