= John Ironmonger (footballer) =

Australian rules footballer

Personal information
- Born: 16 February 1961 (age 65); Western Australia
- Original team: East Perth
- Height: 200 cm (6 ft 7 in)
- Weight: 118 kg (260 lb)
- Position: Ruck

Playing career^{1}
Years	Club	Games (Goals)
1980–1984	East Perth	76 (62)
1985–1987	Sydney Swans	45 (1)
1988–1991	Fitzroy	43 (8)
Total		164 (71)
- ^{1} Playing statistics correct to the end of 1991.

John Ironmonger (born 16 February 1961) is a former Australian rules footballer who played with the Sydney Swans and Fitzroy in the VFL/AFL.

Ironmonger was a 200 cm ruckman and started his football career at East Perth in the WAFL. He made his debut in 1980 and won a Sandover Medal for his efforts in the 1983 season. The following year he was recruited by Sydney with whom he spent three seasons before joining Fitzroy. Injuries restricted his appearances for Fitzroy but he managed 43 games to bring his league tally to 88 games. He also represented West Australia at interstate football on four occasions during his career and New South Wales on one occasion. In 1992 he was recruited by Victorian Football Association club Werribee.

Ironmonger now lives in Colorado, USA. While living in California, he helped found the Santa Cruz Roos in the late 1990s. He is still involved in Australian Football with the Golden Gate Australian Football League.
