= Mike Richardson (Australian footballer) =

Australian rules footballer

Personal information
- Full name: Michael John Richardson
- Born: 16 March 1959 (age 67)
- Original team: Midvale
- Height: 182 cm (6 ft 0 in)
- Weight: 82 kg (12 st 13 lb)

Playing career^{1}
Years	Club	Games (Goals)
1978–82, 1991–93	Swan Districts (WAFL)	139 (210) (Note: These tallies refer to premiership matches (home-and-away and finals matches) only.)
1983–1986	Collingwood	60 (117)
1986	Essendon	15 (14)
1987–1990	Brisbane Bears	81 (43)
1994	West Perth (WAFL)	7 (6)
Total		302 (390)
- ^{1} Playing statistics correct to the end of 1994.

Career highlights
- Premiership player (WAFL) 1982; WA State Team 1980-1985, 1992; All Australian 1983

Michael John Richardson (born 16 March 1959) is a former Australian rules football player who played for Collingwood, Essendon and the Brisbane Bears in the AFL, and Swan Districts and West Perth in the WAFL (Note: Known as the West Australian National Football League (WANFL) in 1978 and 1979.) between the late 1970s and early 1990s.

== Early career ==
Richardson began his career at Swan Districts in 1978 at an age of 19, he was regarded as a highly skilled fast placed roving forward or mid fielder. Richardson played as a rover in the 1982 Grand Final and was among the team's best players. He also topped the goalkicking at Swan Districts that season with 75 goals.

== VFL/AFL career ==
He was recruited to Collingwood in 1983 and played a total of 60 games, kicking 117 goals, before leaving midway through the 1986 season to play for the Essendon. He remained at Essendon for the remainder of the 1986 season playing 15 games and kicking 14 goals. Richardson then joined the debutant Brisbane Bears for the 1987 season he played some of his best football at the club and held down many positions. He left at the end of the 1990 season after playing 81 games and kicking 43 goals to return to Swan Districts.

== WAFL ==
He played another two seasons at Swans before leaving to play with West Perth for the 1994 season, having played 139 games and kicked 210 goals for Swans. It was at West Perth that he brought up his 300th game, before he retired at the end of the season.

During his career, he played 302 premiership games and kicked 390 goals. Richardson was selected in the Swan Districts Team of the Century on a half-forward flank. In 2025 he was inducted into the Swan Districts Hall of Fame.

Mike was elected to the Swan Districts Football Club Board in October 2026.

== Personal life ==
He is the twin brother of former Essendon and WAFL player Stephen Richardson.
