= Bruce Monteath =

Australian rules footballer (born 1955)

Personal information
- Full name: Bruce Monteath
- Born: 20 September 1955 (age 71)
- Original team: South Fremantle (WAFL)
- Height: 188 cm (6 ft 2 in)
- Weight: 85 kg (187 lb)

Playing career^{1}
Years	Club	Games (Goals)
1972-1974, 1981-1983	South Fremantle	117 (263)
1975–1980	Richmond	118 (198)
1984-1985	Claremont	29 (69)
Total		264 (530)
- ^{1} Playing statistics correct to the end of 1985.

Career highlights
- Richmond premiership captain 1980; Michael Roach Medal 1978; All-Australian team 1979; Richmond captain 1980

Bruce Monteath (born 20 September 1955) is a former Australian rules football player who played in the VFL between 1975 and 1980 for the Richmond Football Club. He also played in the WAFL for the South Fremantle Football Club between 1972 and 1974 and then again from 1981 to 1983. He ended his playing career at Claremont (1984-1985) and then coached the West Perth Football Club for the 1987 and 1988 seasons.

His greatest achievement came in 1980 when he captained Richmond to the 1980 Premiership, defeating Collingwood by a then-record 81 points. However, he spent very little time on the ground in this game, despite Richmond's dominance.
