= Gary Shaw (Australian footballer) =

Australian rules footballer

Personal information
- Full name: Gary Wayne Shaw
- Born: 13 February 1959 (age 67)
- Original team: Western Districts (QAFL)
- Draft: No. 3, 1982 interstate draft
- Height: 173 cm (5 ft 8 in)
- Weight: 73 kg (161 lb)

Playing career^{1}
Years	Club	Games (Goals)
1981–82	Claremont	46 (43)
1983–84, 1986	Collingwood	32 (33)
1987	Brisbane Bears	6 (5)
Total		84 (81)
- ^{1} Playing statistics correct to the end of 1987.

Gary Wayne Shaw (born 13 February 1959) is a former Australian rules footballer who played for Collingwood and the Brisbane Bears in the Victorian Football League (VFL) during the 1980s.

Queenslander Gary Shaw started at Queensland Australian Football League (QAFL) club Western Districts before moving west to Western Australian Football League (WAFL) club Claremont where he was a premiership player in 1981. In the Grand Final he shared the Simpson Medal with Maurice Rioli of South Fremantle. A 'Best and Fairest' winner in 1982, Shaw represented Western Australia at interstate football.

Shaw, an on baller, crossed to Collingwood in 1983 but struggled to make an impact. He had his best season in 1984 when he kicked 21 goals and took part in their finals campaign. His stint at Brisbane was also unsuccessful.
