= Graham Moss =

Australian rules footballer (born 1950)

Personal information
- Born: 14 May 1950 (age 76)
- Height: 196 cm (6 ft 5 in)
- Weight: 88 kg (194 lb)

Playing career^{1}
Years	Club	Games (Goals)
1969–72,1977–85	Claremont	242 (264) (Note: These tallies refer to premiership matches (home-and-away and finals matches) only.)
1973–76	Essendon	84 (67)
Total		326 (331)

Representative team honours
Years	Team	Games (Goals)
	Western Australia	23 (30)
	Victoria	5 (?)

Coaching career
Years	Club	Games (W–L–D)
1977–86	Claremont	223 (135–88–0)
- ^{1} Playing statistics correct to the end of 1985.

Career highlights
- Brownlow Medal: (1976); 3× W.S. Crichton Medal: (1974, 1975, 1976); 4× Claremont Best and Fairest: (1977, 1978, 1979, 1980); WAFL Premiership player: (1981); WAFL Premiership coach: (1981); Claremont captain-coach: (1977–1983); Essendon captain: (1976); 2x NFC Champion: (1975, 1979); Simpson Medal: (1977); Australian Football Hall of Fame, inducted 1996; West Australian Football Hall of Fame, inducted 2004, Legend status 2006

Graham Frank Moss (born 14 May 1950) is a former Australian rules footballer who played for the Essendon Football Club in the Victorian Football League (VFL) and for the Claremont Football Club in the West Australian Football League (WAFL).

A Legend in the West Australian Football Hall of Fame, Moss is recognised as one of the finest ruckmen of his era, winning the Brownlow Medal and then returning to Western Australia, eventually captain-coaching Claremont to the 1981 premiership.

After finishing his on-field career, Moss became a respected football administrator, most notably serving as the inaugural chief executive officer of the West Coast Eagles.

== Football career ==
Moss debuted for Claremont Football Club in the WAFL in 1969. In 1970, he made his debut for the Western Australian state team.

Essendon attempted to lure him to Melbourne several times, and finally succeeded before the 1973 season. In his first game, the opening round at Windy Hill against Richmond, Moss made an immediate impression, appropriately enough following an austere pre-game ceremony when the Essendon club held a minute's silence in honour of past legend John Coleman who died some days earlier, and who also famously made a sensational debut. Moss played 89 games for Essendon, winning the club's best and fairest three times, in 1974–76. He also represented Victoria 5 times. In 1976, he captained Essendon and won the Brownlow, but also suffered a serious knee injury. Moss has the second-highest average of Brownlow Medal votes (0.95 per game) of any player ever polled for the award.

He was appointed captain-coach by Claremont in 1977, and commented that his return from Essendon to Claremont was made easy by the fact the VFL and WANFL were of a similar standard at the time. That same year he won the Simpson Medal, while playing for Western Australia against Victoria. Moss led Claremont to a premiership, their first in 17 years, in 1981, and apart from the first two and last two years his tenure with the Tigers was their first period of consistent success since the days of Johnny Leonard’s coaching. Moss ceased playing in 1983 but returned for a few matches in 1985, and retired as coach at the end of the 1986 season to be replaced by Gerard Neesham.

The Graham Moss Medal has been awarded to the best on the ground in the WAFL State of Origin matches from 1995.

In 1996, Moss was inducted into the Australian Football Hall of Fame. In 2004, he was inducted into the West Australian Football Hall of Fame and elevated to the status of "Legend" in 2006.

== Outside football ==
Moss attended Hollywood Senior High School and later graduated with an Associateship in Civil Engineering from the West Australian Institute of Technology in 1971. Moss has served in various administration roles. He was the inaugural chief executive officer of the West Australian Sports Centre Trust from 1986 to 2008. The Trust, now VenuesWest, owns and manages major sports, entertainment and recreation venues on behalf of the Government of Western Australia. He was also the CEO of Tourism WA between 2008 and 2011, and is now a project management consultant for Auzcorp Pty Ltd, which is a property developer and services provider to the Pilbara Region of WA. Moss still lives in Perth, Western Australia.

Moss was honoured with Life Membership at Essendon in March 2015.

== Champions of Essendon ==
In 2002 an Essendon panel ranked him at 17 in their Champions of Essendon list of the 25 greatest players ever to have played for Essendon.
