= East Fremantle Oval =

Australian football ground in East Fremantle

- The Good Grocer Park
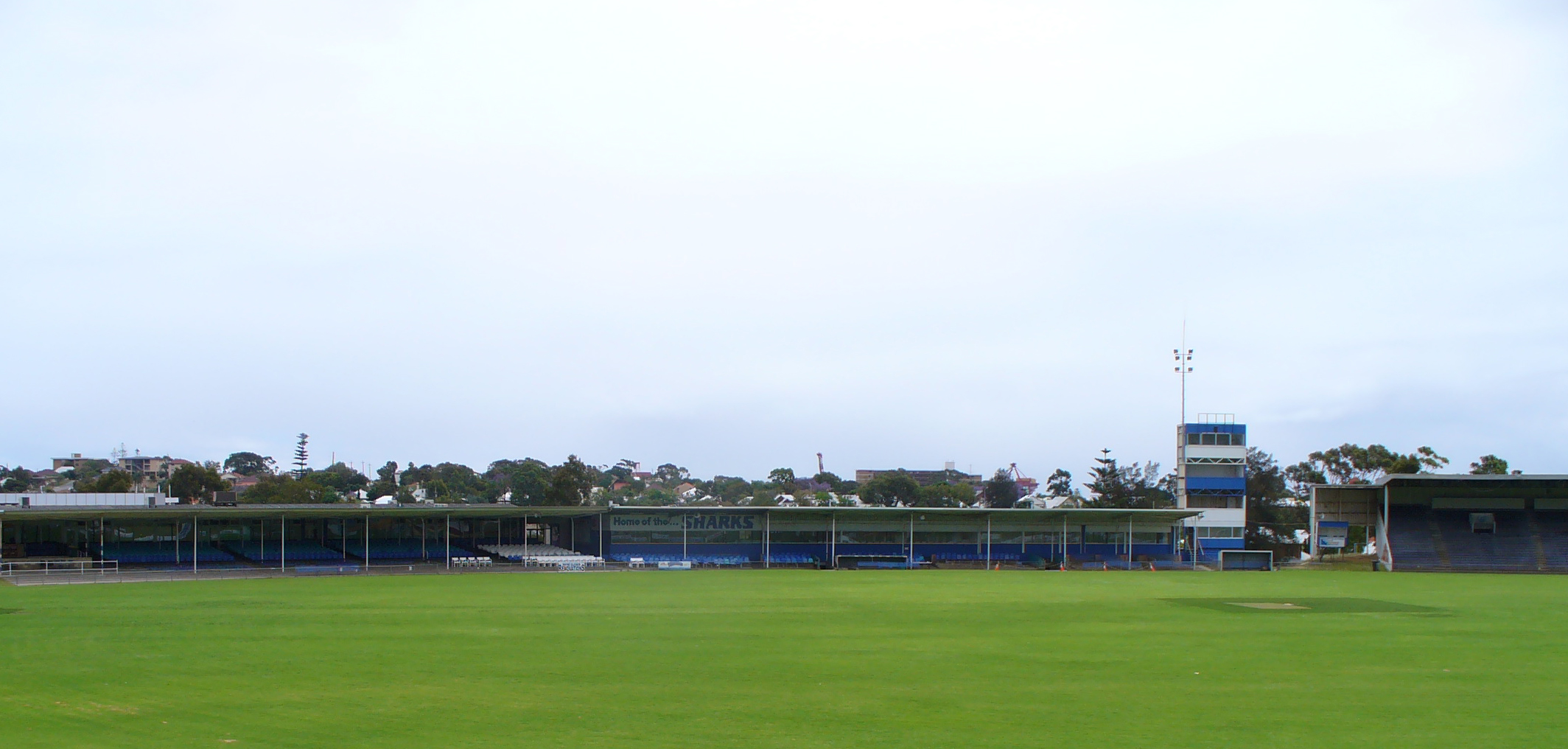
- Interactive map of East Fremantle Oval
- Full name: East Fremantle Community Oval
- Location: East Fremantle, Western Australia
- Coordinates: 32°2′45″S 115°46′7″E
- Owner: Town of East Fremantle
- Operator: East Fremantle Football Club
- Capacity: 20,000
- Surface: grass
- Record attendance: 21,317 (1979)

Construction
- Built: 1904–06
- Opened: 1906
- Expanded: 1953

Tenants
- East Fremantle Football Club (1906; 1953–); East Fremantle Lacrosse Club

East Fremantle Oval, known as The Good Grocer Park under naming rights, is an Australian rules football ground located in East Fremantle, Western Australia. The ground was opened in 1906, and underwent a large redevelopment in 1953. It currently serves as the home ground of the East Fremantle Football Club in the West Australian Football League (WAFL). East Fremantle Oval has a capacity of around 20,000 people, but has hosted in excess of this number previously, with a record crowd of 21,317 for a match between East Fremantle and South Fremantle in the 1979 season.

== History ==
In 1903, the East Fremantle Municipal Council received two grants of land, totalling 6.1 hectares (15 acres), for the establishment of a recreation reserve near the Canning Road. Over three years, a sum of £3,579, equivalent to A$591,394 in 2022, was expended on improvements to the reserve, including the establishment of a bowling green, bandstand, croquet lawn, tennis courts and cricket pitch. The football ground was completed in 1906, and opened by the Governor of Western Australia, Sir Frederick Bedford, on 2 June 1906. The Western Mail reported: "The ground had been laid out in good taste, and with a view to the requirements of the public." The first WAFA game at the ground was held on Saturday, 26 May 1906, with East Fremantle defeating North Fremantle by 80 points, 15.11 (101) to 3.3 (21).

The ground was also utilised by the East Fremantle Lacrosse Club as one of its home venues, and hosted a "Test match" between two Fremantle and Perth sides in 1908.

In 1924, the ground hosted what was to be the final edition of the West Australian State Championship with Subiaco defeating Goldfields Football League side Boulder City 12.12 (84) to 8.13 (61). Pat Rodriguez kicked seven goals for the Maroons.

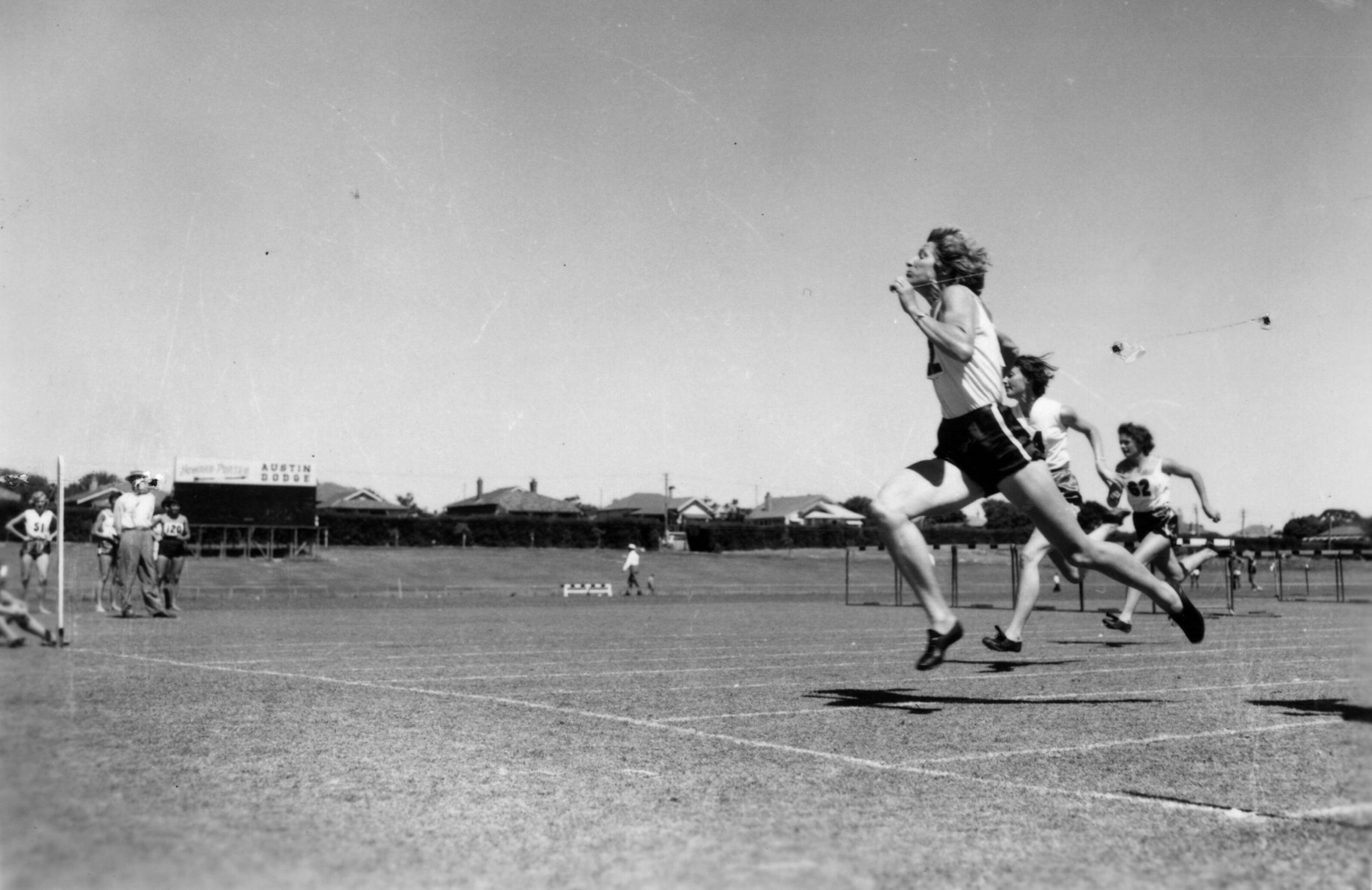
Shirley de la Hunty running at the oval in 1960

Supported by the East Fremantle Town Council, the ground underwent extensive redevelopment from 1949 to 1953. The redeveloped ground was opened by William Wauhop, the Mayor of East Fremantle, on 25 April 1953, with the president, Pat Rodriguez, and secretary, Billy Orr, of the WANFL in attendance. The first match on the new ground was played on the same date, with East Fremantle defeating Claremont by two points.

The ground had a reputation, particularly before the construction of the public stand in 1971, as one of the windiest grounds in the competition. The West Australian said after the first game in 1953: "visiting teams are certain to be worried by the wind factor at East Fremantle Oval, which is comparatively high and unsheltered from sea breezes."

Pink Floyd played a concert at the ground on 24 February 1988 as part of their A Momentary Lapse of Reason Tour.

In 1995, the ground hosted the Fremantle Football Club's first-ever game against another Australian Football League club – a practice match against Essendon on 11 February, with the Dockers winning 14.11 (95) to 6.9 (45) in front of a crowd of 15,921 people. The ground also hosted a match in the 1995 Ansett Cup, with St Kilda defeating Fremantle 19.7 (121) to 13.8 (86) with a crowd of 10,028 people. Stewart Loewe kicked nine goals.

In July 2021, a A$25 million redevelopment of East Fremantle Oval was announced. Work commenced in October 2021, and was completed in late 2024. The upgrades included a renewal of the playing surface and floodlights, construction of new change rooms to better accommodate women's football, and enhanced community facilities. During the redevelopment, East Fremantle relocated their home games to the WACA Ground.
