= Jim Krakouer =

Australian rules footballer, born 1958

Personal information
- Full name: James Gordon Krakouer
- Nickname: Jim
- Born: 13 October 1958 (age 68); Mount Barker, Western Australia
- Original team: North Mt Barker
- Height: 167 cm (5 ft 6 in)
- Weight: 67 kg (148 lb)

Playing career^{1}
Years	Club	Games (Goals)
1977–1981	Claremont	88 (214)
1982–1989	North Melbourne	134 (229)
1990–1991	St Kilda	13 (7)
Total		235 (450)
- ^{1} Playing statistics correct to the end of 1991.

James Gordon Krakouer (born 13 October 1958) is a former Australian rules footballer who played in the 1980s and '90s for North Melbourne and St Kilda in the VFL and Claremont in the WAFL. He is renowned for his quickness, skill, courageous play, and his ability to pass to his brother Phil from seemingly almost any position. His career, however, has been overshadowed by his extensive criminal history.

He is the father of former Richmond and Collingwood AFL player Andrew Krakouer.

== Early life in Mount Barker ==
Krakouer made his senior football debut for North Mount Barker in 1974 at the age of 15, kicking five goals. In September 1974, Jim and a cousin were charged with rape, and despite claiming that the sex was consensual, they were convinced by their lawyer to plead guilty and were sentenced to two years imprisonment, with a six-month minimum. They were incarcerated in a juvenile prison 300 kilometres from Mount Barker in Bunbury. Upon his release, Krakouer returned to Mount Barker and, despite having missed a third of the football season, won the league's best and fairest award by five votes. The following year, only three weeks after gaining his driver's licence, he crashed his car into a road worker and was found guilty of dangerous driving causing death and sentenced to 18 months in jail. While in prison, this time near Mount Barker, he was once allowed to play football for North Mount Barker on day release, but this caused outrage in the Albany community.

== Claremont career ==
Krakouer moved to Perth to play for Claremont in the WAFL in 1977. At first, he played in the junior Colts team, but by July the league team's poor form had prompted the club president Wal Maskiell to ask that Krakouer be given a game in the league team. He performed well and maintained his position in the side for the rest of the season. In 1978, his brother Phillip joined him at Claremont, and they both had a successful season. Jim was named in the state squad, and Phil scored more goals than any other debutant. Jim made his interstate debut in 1979, a year before Phil. They played their first state game together in 1981, in an 87-point win over South Australia, with Jim and Gary Buckenara sharing the Simpson Medal as best players.

In October 1981, in Jim and Phil's last game for Claremont, they were part of Claremont's WAFL Premiership side, beating the 1980 premiers South Fremantle.

== North Melbourne career ==
After being pursued by Geelong and North Melbourne, the Krakouer brothers signed with North Melbourne on a three-year contract worth a total of $750,000 ($2,788,132 in 2021 terms). The main reasons for choosing the Kangaroos over Geelong were due to Western Australian football legend Barry Cable being the North Melbourne coach and the contract payments being guaranteed rather than performance-based.

In their second season in the VFL, Jim and Phil both kicked 44 goals and shared the leading goalkicker award at North Melbourne. Jim was awarded the Syd Barker Medal for club best and fairest in 1986 and topped the goalkicking again in 1986 and 1988. Phil was the leading goalkicker in 1985 and 1987.

The Krakouer brothers were praised for their highly skilful play and the manner in which they often passed to each other from almost any position. In one match report in 1986, they were referred to as the "Pelé and Maradona of the VFL".

Jim Krakouer was named in the Indigenous Team of the Century in 2005.

== Legal proceedings ==
In 1974, Krakouer, at the age of 16, was convicted of rape in Albany Court; despite maintaining the sex was consensual. He was convicted in the same court of driving causing death in 1976. In 1985, Krakouer was convicted of 26 counts of sexual penetration of a minor, assault, abduction and unlawful imprisonment. Despite being very well paid during his career, Krakouer was a problem gambler and frittered away all of his money. Consequently, Krakouer turned to crime to get by. In 1996, Krakouer was convicted and imprisoned for 16 years for his part in a drug-trafficking scheme transporting amphetamines from Melbourne to Perth. Having served nine years of his sentence, he was released on work release in August 2004. He has also had restraining orders held against him due to his violent behaviour.

In September 2023, Jim and Phil Krakouer, along with six other former AFL players who played football between 1975 and 2022, launched a class action lawsuit against the AFL in the Supreme Court of Victoria, alleging that the AFL failed to protect players from racial abuse on the field.

== See also ==
- List of Australian rules football families
