= Phil Krakouer =

Australian rules footballer, born 1960

Personal information
- Full name: Phillip Brent Krakouer
- Born: 15 January 1960 (age 66)
- Original team: North Mt Barker
- Height: 178 cm (5 ft 10 in)
- Weight: 75 kg (165 lb)

Playing career^{1}
Years	Club	Games (Goals)
1978–1981	Claremont	90 (192)
1982–1989	North Melbourne	141 (224)
1990–1991	Footscray	7 (7)
Total		238 (423)
- ^{1} Playing statistics correct to the end of 1991.

Phillip Brent Krakouer (born 15 January 1960) is a former Australian rules footballer who played for the North Melbourne Football Club during the 1980s. Notable for his speed, freakish skills and an uncanny ability to pass the ball to his brother, Jim Krakouer, who also played for North Melbourne. The position favoured for Phil Krakouer was as a half-forward flank or wingman.

The Krakouer brothers, the children of Eric and Phoebe Krakouer, were born and lived in Mount Barker, Western Australia. The brothers played their first senior football for Mount Barker for the North Mount Barker Football Club as teenagers, where their incredible skills were first noticed. Phil made his league debut for the Claremont Football Club in 1978, whilst elder brother Jim had made his Claremont debut the year before.

In 1982, both Krakouer brothers left to play for the North Melbourne Football Club (Kangaroos) after they had helped Claremont in winning the previous year's WAFL premiership.

Phil played 141 games for North Melbourne and 7 for Footscray. He also topped the North Melbourne goalkicking list on three occasions: 1983, 1985 and 1987.

Phil Krakouer is the uncle of AFL player Andrew Krakouer who played for Richmond and then Collingwood. Andrew Krakouer won a Sandover Medal when playing for Swan Districts in the WAFL. Phil is also the uncle of former Port Adelaide and Gold Coast player Nathan Krakouer.

In September 2023, Phil and Jim Krakouer, along with six other former AFL players who played football between 1975 and 2022, launched a class action lawsuit against the AFL in the Supreme Court of Victoria, alleging that the AFL failed to protect players from racial abuse on the field.
