= Bassendean Oval =

Football oval in Perth, Western Australia

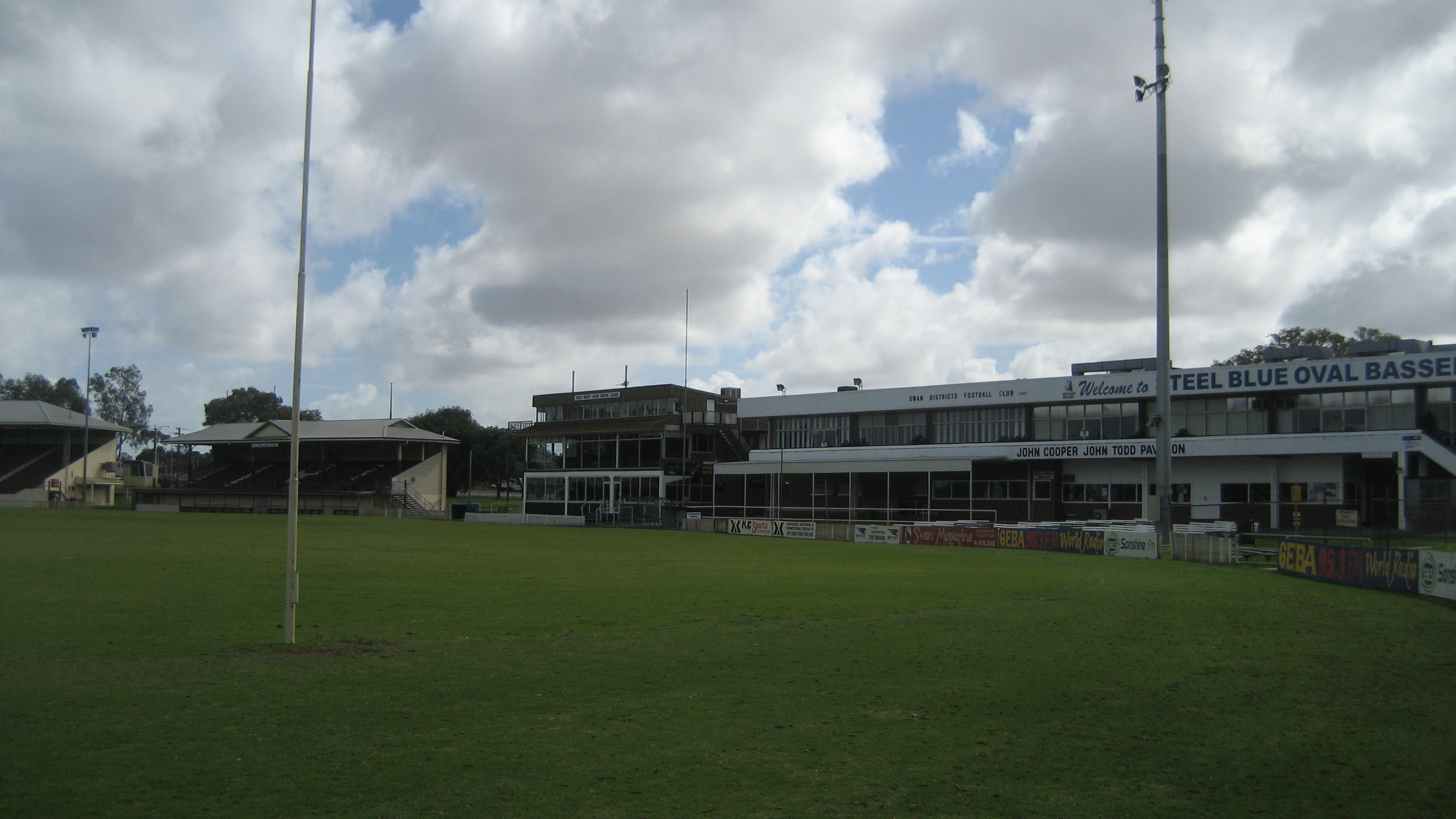
- Interactive map of Bassendean Oval
- Location: Bassendean, Western Australia
- Coordinates: 31°54′11″S 115°57′21″E
- Operator: Swan Districts Football Club
- Capacity: 22,000
- Surface: Grass

Construction
- Opened: 1929

Tenant
- Swan Districts Swans (WAFL)

Western Australia Heritage Register
- Designated: 17 October 2003
- Reference no.: 7403

Bassendean Oval (currently known as Steel Blue Oval under sponsorship arrangements) is a sports stadium located in Bassendean, Western Australia. It was officially opened in 1929 and significantly upgraded in 1932. The capacity of the venue is 22,000 people.

It usually hosts Australian rules football matches. The first WAFL match was played there in 1934, and it has since been home to the Swan Districts Football Club in both the WAFL and the WAWFL.

The crowd record is 22,350, for a WAFL match between Swan Districts and West Perth in 1980.

The stadium played host to the Big Day Out in 1997, 1999, 2000, and 2001 and the Soundwave Festival show in March 2008, 2009, and 2010.

== Heritage ==
Walk through of the heritage listed entrance

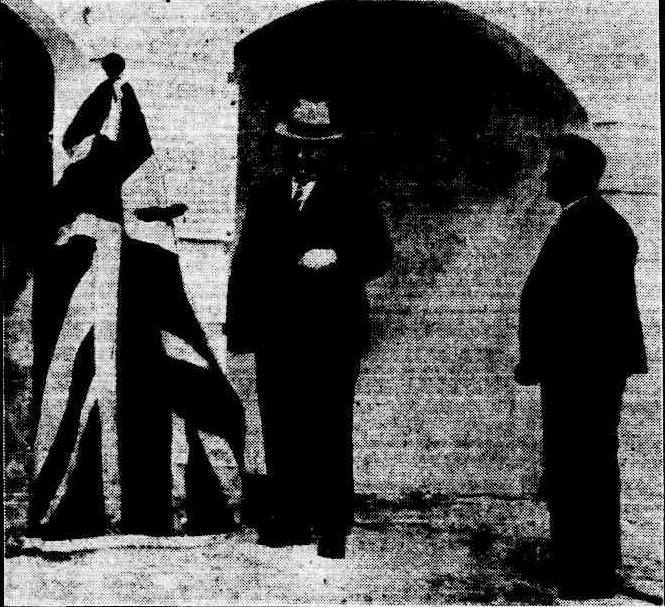
Opening of Bassendean Oval by WA premier Philip Collier in 1929

The stadium has several listed heritage structures; the main entrance gates at West Road and Brook Street date to the first construction in 1929, including two timber grandstands built in 1932 and 1938 and clubrooms built in 1932 and 1972.
