= 1987 WAFL season =

Australian rules football season

- Teams: 8
- Premiers: Claremont; 6th premiership
- Minor premiers: Claremont; 6th minor premiership
- Sandover Medallist: Mark Watson (Perth)
- Bernie Naylor Medallist: Todd Breman (Subiaco) (111)

The 1987 WAFL season was the 103rd season of the West Australian Football League in its various iterations. This season saw a Western Australia-based team, West Coast, that was one of two interstate teams (Note: The other was the Gold Coast-based Brisbane Bears.) to make their debut in the Victorian Football League (VFL), which had profound effects on the WAFL competition. The Eagles took away thirty-five of the competition's best players, severely reducing attendances and club revenue, the latter of which was further affected by the payment of the Eagles' licence fee to the VFL. The WAFL budgeted for a 30 percent decline in attendances, but the observed decline was over fifty percent, and they were also hit by Channel Seven telecasting the Round 17 Hawthorn versus Footscray match, breaching agreements to not telecast non-Eagles VFL matches to Perth.

As small compensation, Claremont under captain-coach Gerard Neesham developed an innovation possession-oriented "chip and draw" style of football that allowed the Tigers to achieve the best record of any WA(N)FL team since East Fremantle's unbeaten season of 1946. Claremont lost only its second game, (Note: Since the WAFA expanded to six clubs in 1901, the only other clubs to have bettered Claremont's 1987 record are East Perth with a perfect season of 21 wins in the 1944 under-age competition, and Subiaco with 21 wins and a one-point loss in 2008, the Lions with 20 wins out of 20 in 2018, and the Lions again with 19 wins out of 20 in 2019.) finishing the season with twenty-one consecutive undefeated matches – Peter Melesso getting the Tigers out of its only two possible defeats by after-the siren kicks. An outstanding defence led by future Eagle champion Guy McKenna permitted the fewest points against any WA(N)FL team since the wet 1973 season, whilst utility Derek Kickett polled 46 Sandover Medal votes but was ineligible due to suspension and the return of Warren Ralph made the attack the best in the league. Over the three grades, Claremont amassed a record total of 53 wins and three draws from 63 matches.

South Fremantle, who appeared revitalised early in the season, suffered a crippling injury and suspension toll plus the walkout of returning star "Jacko" Jackson and the elevation to West Coast of early-season stars Hart and Worsfold. This left the Bulldogs with twenty-five senior players unavailable mid-season, and the club consequently suffered eighteen consecutive losses to take the wooden spoon for the first time since 1972 and the last to date. In the middle of the season South Fremantle were fielding twelve or more first-year players. Although coach Magro admitted many were not up to league standard in 1987, some of these like Peter Matera were to be decisive in returning the red and whites to prominence the following season. Perth, league finalists in 1986 for the first time since 1978, fell from twelve wins to six as the Demons were severely affected by the loss of key players Wiley and Yorgey to the VFL, and dynamic forward Wayne Ryder with a series of knee injuries that never allowed him two games in succession.

Major innovations were the pre-season ‘Kresta Cup' night competition, in which the Tigers showed traces of their devastating form during the winter, the return of Perth to the WACA Ground after twenty-eight seasons playing at Lathlain Park, and the first night matches for premiership points in WA(N)FL history. Improved drainage and a drier climate in Perth completely eliminated problems experienced at the WACA in the 1940s and 1950s; nonetheless the move was not regarded as a success and the Demons returned to Lathlain in 1989.

== Clubs ==
Club	Coach	Captain	Best and fairest	Leading goalkicker
Claremont	Gerard Neesham	Gerard Neesham	Peter Thorne	Warren Ralph (75)
East Fremantle	Graham Melrose	Brian Peake	Brian Peake	Clinton Browning (75)
East Perth	Gerard McNeil	Chris Allen	George Giannakis	Grant Campbell (28)
Perth	Mal Brown; Mick Moylan (Note: Moylan acted as coach for the Round 19 match against East Fremantle as Brown was so ill at midday he had to leave the coach's box.)	Mick Rea	Mark Watson	Mick Rea (81)
South Fremantle	Stan Magro	Brad Collard	Scott Watters	Mark Jackson (45)
Subiaco	Haydn Bunton, Jr.	Neil Taylor	Greg Wilkinson	Todd Breman (111)
Swan Districts	John Todd	Brent Hutton	Troy Ugle	Kevin Caton (45)
West Perth	Bruce Monteath	Peter Menaglio	Craig Nelson	Paddy Madaffari (66)

== Home-and-away season ==
=== Round 1 ===
	Round 1
Saturday, 4 April	Swan Districts 13.11 (89)	def.	West Perth 11.21 (87)	Bassendean Oval (crowd: 2440)
Saturday, 4 April	Claremont 17.9 (111)	def.	Perth 11.13 (79)	Claremont Oval (crowd: 3330)
Sunday, 5 April	East Perth 14.14 (98)	def. by	South Fremantle 19.15 (129)	Rushton Park (crowd: 4547)
Sunday, 5 April	Subiaco 14.15 (99)	def. by	East Fremantle 18.21 (129)	Subiaco Oval (crowd: 4376)
The effect of the entry of the West Coast Eagles to the Victorian Football League, (Note: All Eagles matches in Victoria from the club's formation were broadcast live to Perth, and despite the time difference with eastern Australia this broadcast still overlapped with playing times for WAFL matches.) along with district cricket at the WACA, was seen in the total opening round WAFL attendance of 14693 being less than half of the opening round attendance in 1986 of 36499.; Former forward Tony Beers, moved at the last minute to defence, does an outstanding job on the previously potent Perth forward line to produce a convincing revenge for Claremont's 1986 first semi-final defeat.

=== Round 2 ===
	Round 2
Friday, 10 April (6:45 pm)	West Perth 16.12 (108)	def.	Claremont 14.13 (97)	WACA (crowd: 3478)
Saturday, 11 April	Perth 11.9 (75)	def. by	South Fremantle 22.19 (151)	WACA (crowd: 2918)
Saturday, 11 April	East Perth 10.9 (69)	def. by	Subiaco 27.19 (181)	Perth Oval (crowd: 2637)
Saturday, 11 April	East Fremantle 23.17 (155)	def.	Swan Districts 11.6 (72)	East Fremantle Oval (crowd: 3069)
In the first night match for premiership points and the first WA(N)FL match at the WACA since September 1958, a fast-paced match despite slippery conditions sees West Perth inflict what would become Claremont's only loss for 1987.; Future Eagle stars Hart and Worsfold dominate for South Fremantle against a disappointing Perth team affected by injuries and Eagle commitments, turning Perth's WACA "homecoming" sour.

=== Round 3 (Easter weekend) ===
	Round 3
Saturday, 18 April	South Fremantle 20.18 (138)	def.	West Perth 20.16 (136)	Fremantle Oval (crowd: 4750)
Saturday, 18 April	Perth 22.21 (153)	def.	East Perth 10.17 (77)	WACA (crowd: 2204)
Sunday, 19 April	Claremont 12.14 (86)	def.	East Fremantle 11.14 (80)	Mount Barker (crowd: 2556)
Monday, 20 April	Swan Districts 13.20 (98)	def.	Subiaco 13.10 (88)	Bassendean Oval (crowd: 4846)
The first ever official WAFL game in Mt Barker sees Derek Kickett, placed in defence for the first time, become the decisive factor in holding off a slow-starting East Fremantle team.; Ninety seconds from the final siren David Hart receives two fifteen-metre penalties against West Perth's Gavin Wake – the first for running over the mark and the second for delaying in giving the ball – to move from 70 metres (76.55 yd) to 40 metres (43.74 yd) from goal and kick the winner in a fluctuating match where a mid-game burst of 8.4 (52) to a behind with six goals from much travelled Mark "Jacko" Jackson is decisive.

=== Round 4 (Anzac Day) ===
	Round 4
Friday, 24 April (6:45 pm)	Claremont 15.13 (103)	def.	Subiaco 12.16 (88)	WACA (crowd: 2726)
Saturday, 25 April	East Perth 15.11 (101)	def. by	Swan Districts 19.20 (134)	Perth Oval (crowd: 2523)
Sunday, 26 April	West Perth 14.14 (98)	def. by	Perth 20.16 (136)	Leederville Oval (crowd: 5262)
Monday, 27 April	South Fremantle 14.8 (92)	def. by	East Fremantle 16.13 (109)	Fremantle Oval (crowd: 13757)
Teenager Greg Walker, angry at being left on the bench for the first half, gives vent to his frustration by winning the match for Swan Districts, who forge away after an even three quarters and reveal Walker and twenty-year-old Andy Holmes a roving combination of great potential.; In a typically tough derby, centre half-back John O‘Sullivan, full-back Colin Waterson, debutant Jon Derecourt and Tony Solin break down South Fremantle's attacking power, especially during the third quarter when South score only one goal and are left with too difficult a deficit to make up.

=== Round 5 ===
	Round 5
Sunday, 29 March	West Perth 16.20 (116)	def.	East Perth 12.14 (86)	Subiaco Oval (crowd: 27500)
Friday, 1 May (6:45 pm)	Perth 11.15 (81)	def. by	East Fremantle 17.22 (124)	WACA (crowd: 3262)
Saturday, 2 May	South Fremantle 14.13 (97)	def. by	Subiaco 25.15 (165)	Fremantle Oval (crowd: 4503)
Saturday, 2 May	Claremont 22.26 (158)	def.	Swan Districts 8.11 (59)	Claremont Oval (crowd: 3689)
The West Perth vs East Perth game was played as a double-header before the West Coast Eagles' inaugural match against Richmond.; After the loss of numerous premiership players and a disappointing beginning to the season, Subiaco – with Rod Willett taking over Dwayne Lamb's role as a defensive ruck-rover – thrash the Bulldogs, who had previously looked rejuvenated after three disappointing seasons since 1984.; Superb defensive work by Kickett, McKenna, Beers and former spearhead John Scott restrict Swan Districts to 2.6 (18) after half-time, as Claremont suggest tremendous potential for the 1987 season after a slow start.

=== Round 6 ===
	Round 6
Saturday, 9 May	Swan Districts 7.12 (54)	def.	South Fremantle 6.8 (44)	Bassendean Oval (crowd: 2893)
Saturday, 9 May	Subiaco 17.13 (115)	def.	Perth 12.10 (82)	Subiaco Oval (crowd: 3184)
Saturday, 9 May	Claremont 18.21 (129)	def.	East Perth 6.9 (45)	Claremont Oval (crowd: 2012)
Saturday, 9 May	East Fremantle 14.11 (95)	def.	West Perth 4.11 (35)	East Fremantle Oval (crowd: 3324)
Debutant Don Pyke, centreman Ben Allan (who had lost brother Jeremy on the Friday) and Joe Ahmat give Claremont a powerful centreline that defies the wind and rain to score 11.9 (75) to a single behind after a "hard and honest" East Perth looked like going close to a first victory.; Three goals from free kicks in six minutes gives Swan Districts a decisive break in the rainy conditions – as the Bulldogs appear to relax after allowing only one goal in the first half.; Brian Peake's dominance and East Fremantle's solid defence – helped by West Perth consistently using the defensive side of the ground when kicking with the wind – ensures an easy win wherein the Falcons kick the lowest WAFL score since Claremont's 3.4 (22) in June 1980.

=== Round 7 ===
	Round 7
Saturday, 16 May	West Perth 19.19 (133)	def.	Swan Districts 12.20 (92)	Leederville Oval (crowd: 3495)
Saturday, 16 May	East Perth 21.13 (139)	def.	South Fremantle 18.14 (122)	Perth Oval (crowd: 3082)
Saturday, 16 May	East Fremantle 26.5 (161)	def.	Subiaco 14.15 (99)	East Fremantle Oval (crowd: 4420)
Saturday, 16 May (7:30 pm)	Perth 10.11 (71)	def. by	Claremont 23.20 (158)	WACA (crowd: 3241)
A WAFL record of twenty consecutive goals without a miss, and ten goals by Browning, ensures the Sharks crush the Lions for the second occasion during 1987.; Prime Minister Bob Hawke – South Fremantle's number one badge-holder – was a guest for the second time at a red and white match, but as in the 1981 Grand Final to no avail as the score flatters South Fremantle who were poor for three quarters and hindered in their last-quarter comeback by eight behinds from "Jacko".

=== Round 8 ===
	Round 8
Saturday, 23 May	West Perth 17.8 (110)	def. by	Subiaco 24.16 (160)	Leederville Oval (crowd: 4543)
Saturday, 23 May	Swan Districts 20.18 (138)	def.	Perth 16.15 (111)	Bassendean Oval (crowd: 4621)
Saturday, 23 May	South Fremantle 14.11 (95)	def. by	Claremont 25.18 (168)	Fremantle Oval (crowd: 4947)
Saturday, 23 May	East Perth 10.10 (70)	def. by	East Fremantle 26.18 (174)	Perth Oval (crowd: 2612)
With Neil Taylor in amazing touch in the centre, Subiaco almost emulate East Fremantle's performance from the previous round, scoring fifteen straight goals up to the four-minute mark of the third quarter and flattering West Perth after the initial sixteen minutes.; In a violent match that continues South Fremantle's decline, Bulldog skipper Brad Collard was suspended for four weeks for kicking rookie sensation Pyke in the head when a pack formed ten minutes into the second quarter after umpire Grant Vernon said "it was no accident". A week and three days after regular WAFL Tribunal hearings, after an investigation into a broken jaw sustained by Bulldog ruckman Dean Irving, Claremont's Peter Higgins was suspended for six matches.; In the South Fremantle v Claremont colts match, a South Fremantle player was alleged to have bitten the ears of Craig Tester of Claremont. (Note: No AFL player was ever charged with biting any part of an opponent until Chris Lewis was charged with biting Todd Viney in the sixteenth round of 1991.) At the Higgins hearing this player was identified as Richard Zurnoch and outed for three matches.

=== Round 9 ===
	Round 9
Saturday, 30 May	Perth 12.22 (94)	def. by	West Perth 15.20 (110)	WACA (crowd: 3407)
Saturday, 30 May	East Perth 10.15 (75)	def. by	Swan Districts 15.15 (105)	Subiaco Oval (crowd: 2891)
Saturday, 30 May	Claremont 11.23 (89)	drew with	Subiaco 13.11 (89)	Claremont Oval (crowd: 5067)
Saturday, 30 May	East Fremantle 22.22 (154)	def.	South Fremantle 17.11 (113)	East Fremantle Oval (crowd: 5913)
Claremont's inaccuracy allows Subiaco to break its winning run with only the second draw at Claremont Oval, and the last until 2025. It was Subiaco's first draw since 1966, at the time the longest such sequence in the WA(N)FL though broken several times since.; Peter Melesso kicked a behind from fifty metres out after the siren to draw after missing two easier shots that could have given the Tigers another win, whilst Todd Breman proves the outstanding player of the match with 7.3 (45) including all Subiaco's last four goals – one after the third quarter siren.; In Bryan Cousins' three-hundredth league match, Perth cannot overcome a woefully inaccurate 2.10 (22) in the first quarter, and coach Brown points a finger at the umpires at the last change.

=== Round 10 ===
	Round 10
Saturday, 6 June	Subiaco 14.15 (99)	def.	Swan Districts 10.18 (78)	Subiaco Oval (crowd: 2729)
Saturday, 6 June	West Perth 37.17 (239)	def.	South Fremantle 4.5 (29)	Leederville Oval (crowd: 2104)
Saturday, 6 June	East Perth 16.9 (105)	def. by	Perth 16.10 (106)	Perth Oval (crowd: 1430)
Saturday, 6 June	East Fremantle 10.14 (74)	def. by	Claremont 13.13 (91)	East Fremantle Oval (crowd: 3604)
West Perth equalled their highest-ever score set in Round 10, 1981. The 210-point margin was also the greatest in senior WA(N)FL history, though exceeded in the under-age 1944 competition, and South's score the lowest in the WAFL since Round 12, 1980.; Paddy Maddafari scored ten goals, whilst in the third quarter South Fremantle's Scott Wilcox, whose injury left them with seventeen men and eighteen injured senior players, was carried off by West Perth trainers as the Bulldog ones had supposedly "gone home".; In a top class game Claremont move to the top permanently by taking advantage of East Fremantle giving them first use of the wind when the weather was dry – rain fell through the second half and East Fremantle could not make up a six-goal deficit at the last change. Derek Kickett, back in attack, scores two wonderful goals.; 10.2 (62) by Perth in the third quarter gives the Demons a thrilling win after being six goals down at half-time, as Mark Watson takes over the centre from Peter Spencer.

=== Round 11 ===
	Round 11
Saturday, 13 June	Subiaco 19.16 (130)	def.	East Perth 9.5 (59)	Subiaco Oval (crowd: 3449)
Saturday, 13 June	South Fremantle 14.16 (100)	def. by	Perth 24.14 (160)	Fremantle Oval (crowd: 2424)
Saturday, 13 June	Claremont 22.15 (147)	def.	West Perth 7.9 (51)	Claremont Oval (crowd: 4933)
Saturday, 13 June	Swan Districts 22.12 (144)	def.	East Fremantle 16.13 (109)	Bassendean Oval (crowd: 3128)
9.6 (60) to 1.2 (8) in the first quarter ensures West Perth fail their critical test and have little hope of displacing Subiaco or Swan Districts from the four. Guy McKenna smashed the Falcon attack where only Bradmore was any threat.; Swan Districts surprisingly outscore East Fremantle 19.6 (120) to 7.5 (47) from the eighteen-minute-mark of the second quarter, as they exploit the Sharks' lack of pace and unexpected unwillingness to contest.

=== Interstate match ===
	Western Australia v South Australia
Tuesday, 16 June	Western Australia 9.9 (63)	def. by	South Australia 18.16 (124)	WACA (crowd: 7200)
This was the first night state game to be played in Perth.

=== Round 12 ===
	Round 12
Saturday, 20 June	East Perth 8.19 (67)	def. by	West Perth 16.18 (114)	Perth Oval (crowd: 2108)
Saturday, 20 June	Swan Districts 7.15 (57)	def. by	Claremont 10.19 (79)	Bassendean Oval (crowd: 3976)
Saturday, 20 June	Subiaco 23.11 (149)	def.	South Fremantle 11.10 (76)	Subiaco Oval (crowd: 2918)
Saturday, 20 June	East Fremantle 15.13 (103)	def.	Perth 4.8 (32)	East Fremantle Oval (crowd: 2812)
Despite scoring 1.13 (19) in the second quarter with the wind, four goals into it during the first quarter ensures Claremont become the first visiting club to win at Bassendean in 1987. Swans themselves score 1.8 (14) including three "posters" with the wind in the third quarter.; Subiaco's players claim the first half – when the Lions scored 10.8 (68) to 2.1 (13) in wet conditions – was the least competitive football they had played at WAFL level, although South do show some pride after the long interval.

=== Round 13 ===
	Round 13
Saturday, 27 June	Perth 9.8 (62)	def.	Subiaco 18.24 (142)	WACA (crowd: 2607)
Saturday, 27 June	South Fremantle 17.11 (113)	def. by	Swan Districts 19.30 (144)	Fremantle Oval (crowd: 2492)
Saturday, 27 June	Claremont 26.20 (176)	def.	East Perth 10.9 (69)	Subiaco Oval (crowd: 2442)
Saturday, 27 June	West Perth 19.14 (128)	def.	East Fremantle 12.19 (91)	Leederville Oval (crowd: 3405)
Brian Peake played his 250th game for East Fremantle, but struggling WAFL chief executive Peter Cumminsky gains a wish as West Perth challenge the top four by scoring 10.7 (67) to 0.5 (5) in the forty minutes either side of half-time, with future Essendon star Darren Bewick beating Peake in the centre.

=== Round 14 ===
	Round 14
Saturday, 4 July	Subiaco 20.12 (132)	def.	West Perth 13.11 (89)	Subiaco Oval (crowd: 5525)
Saturday, 4 July	Claremont 21.10 (136)	def.	South Fremantle 20.14 (134)	Claremont Oval (crowd: 3041)
Saturday, 4 July	East Fremantle 30.12 (192)	def.	East Perth 17.10 (112)	East Fremantle Oval (crowd: 2777)
Saturday, 4 July	Perth 12.13 (85)	def. by	Swan Districts 15.25 (115)	Kalgoorlie (crowd: 2774)
An old-fashioned policy of resting ruckmen Edwards and Gatti in the forward pocket – even making Neesham move Ralph into defence – nearly garners a brave South Fremantle a huge upset, only denied by an after-the siren goal from Melesso after a mark with fifteen seconds remaining.; Despite setting the pace for forty minutes, West Perth are overrun by a depleted Subiaco team, whose ability to switch centre-half-forwards Langdon and Georgiades is never countered by the Falcon defence.

=== Round 15 ===
	Round 15
Saturday, 11 July	Claremont 13.23 (101)	def.	Perth 13.9 (87)	Claremont Oval (crowd: 2873)
Saturday, 11 July	Swan Districts 15.16 (106)	def. by	West Perth 16.17 (113)	Bassendean Oval (crowd: 4473)
Saturday, 11 July	Subiaco 13.11 (89)	def. by	East Fremantle 20.18 (138)	Subiaco Oval (crowd: 6718)
Saturday, 11 July	South Fremantle 14.11 (95)	def. by	East Perth 19.15 (129)	Fremantle Oval (crowd: 2738)
East Fremantle return to form in a fluctuating match where Subiaco concede the first nine goals, then kick nine of the next ten before the Sharks kick away as wingmen Rankin and Waterman dominate.; South Fremantle – after their effort against Claremont red-hot favourites to win and seal the wooden spoon for the Royals – produce a bleak display that sees them score nothing against East Perth's 8.8 (56) between the 22-minute mork of the first term and halfway through the second, to leave the game out of reach by half-time.

=== Round 16 ===
	Round 16
Saturday, 18 July	Perth 20.17 (137)	def.	South Fremantle 16.13 (119)	Subiaco Oval (crowd: 2772)
Saturday, 18 July	East Perth 13.9 (87)	def. by	Subiaco 16.14 (110)	Perth Oval (crowd: 3368)
Saturday, 18 July	East Fremantle 15.15 (105)	def. by	Swan Districts 22.18 (150)	WACA (crowd: 5862)
Saturday, 18 July	West Perth 11.11 (77)	def. by	Claremont 20.11 (131)	Leederville Oval (crowd: 7906)
Swan Districts convincingly down East Fremantle to be a game – plus 33.21 percent – from the double chance as the injury-plagued Kevin Caton returns to score 7.6 (48) as a late inclusion, whilst the Sharks lose Peake to a knee arthroscope.; Allan Daniels consigns South Fremantle to a thirteenth consecutive defeat and keep the wooden spoon battle alive with three late goals – while the Bulldogs lose key forward Merv Dellar in unusual fashion as his collarbone breaks when he is running into an open goal.

=== State-of-Origin Match ===
1987 State-of-Origin Match
Tuesday, 22 July (2:45 pm)	Western Australia	def. by	Victoria	Subiaco Oval
4.4 (28); 6.4 (40); 9.12 (66); 13.14 (92)	Q1; Q2; Q3; Final	5.5 (35); 8.11 (59); 12.16 (88); 16.20 (116)	Umpires: Grant Vernon, Ian Clayton; Simpson Medal: Andrew Bews (Victoria)
Bairstow 3.3; Jimmy Krakouer 2.2; Ishchenko 2.1; Rance, Rioli 1.2; Narkle 1.1; Michael Mitchell, Hart, Dorotich 1.0; Breman, Holden 0.1	Goals	5.4 Salmon; 3.1 Royal; 2.2 Morris; 2.0 Rhys-Jones; 1.1 Williams; 1.0 Murphy, Johnston, Foster; 0.4 Weightman; 0.1 Loveridge, Osborne
Holden, Narkle, Bairstow, Mainwaring, Malaxos, Keene, Rioli	Best	Simon Madden, Bews, Salmon, Toohey, Williams, Gerard Healy, Roos
In a dour struggle in slippery conditions, West Australia's weakness in the key forward positions ensures they never heads the Victorians. Western Australia had only three players in the ‘All-Australian' team selected after the match.

=== Round 17 ===
	Round 17
Saturday, 25 July	Swan Districts 12.17 (89)	def. by	Subiaco 15.16 (106)	Bassendean Oval (crowd: 5914)
Saturday, 25 July	West Perth 13.17 (95)	def.	South Fremantle 10.13 (73)	Subiaco Oval (crowd: 2665)
Saturday, 25 July	Perth 17.11 (113)	def. by	East Perth 23.14 (152)	WACA (crowd: 2497)
Saturday, 25 July	Claremont 25.8 (158)	def.	East Fremantle 17.10 (112)	Claremont Oval (crowd: 5211)
Claremont score 12.5 (77) to 2.2 (14) after East Fremantle kick five unanswered goals to take a seventeen-point lead. Despite Ralph being moved into defence on Colin Waterson, Peter Thorne roved superbly for eight goals.

=== Round 18 ===
	Round 18
Saturday, 1 August	West Perth 15.13 (103)	def.	Perth 10.13 (73)	Leederville Oval (crowd: 2725)
Saturday, 1 August	East Fremantle 24.13 (157)	def.	South Fremantle 18.8 (116)	East Fremantle Oval (crowd: 3952)
Saturday, 1 August	East Perth 17.19 (121)	def. by	Swan Districts 25.16 (166)	Perth Oval (crowd: 3092)
Saturday, 1 August	Subiaco 14.7 (91)	def. by	Claremont 14.11 (95)	Subiaco Oval (crowd: 6500)
Despite 37 possessions from Brian Taylor on the ball and a dominant centreline, Subiaco's forward weakness allows Claremont to extend their unbeaten run to sixteen matches.; Kevin Caton score 10.6 (66) and combines with ruckman Jim Buckley and on-ballers Troy Ugle and Joe Cormack to hold off West Perth‘s challenge for fourth position after Swans‘ previous defeat.; Although Sumich and Edwards lead a charge of ten first-quarter goals, South lose yet again as Browning boots nine majors and Bushell seven, while the Bulldogs fail completely in the third quarter.

=== Round 19 ===
	Round 19
Saturday, 8 August	South Fremantle 14.11 (95)	def. by	Subiaco 14.13 (97)	Fremantle Oval (crowd: 2628)
Saturday, 8 August	Perth 15.17 (107)	def. by	East Fremantle 16.9 (105)	Subiaco Oval (crowd: 2063)
Saturday, 8 August	Claremont 15.18 (108)	def.	Swan Districts 12.16 (88)	Claremont Oval (crowd: 4732)
Saturday, 8 August	West Perth 21.15 (141)	def.	East Perth 18.8 (116)	Leederville Oval (crowd: 3414)
Perth's acting coach Mick Moylan celebrates a thrilling win from five goals behind at three-quarter time after a doubtful mark to Rea on the goal line, whilst Swans' loss allows West Perth to enter the four for the first time.; Peter Sumich's power against a Lion defence minus the injured Greg Wilkisnon nearly gives South Fremantle an end to their losing streak, despite scoring only 2.5 (17) in perfect conditions to half-time – Graham Kickett kicked what would have been a match-winning goal but it was disallowed because a Subiaco mark had been paid.

=== Round 20 ===
	Round 20
Saturday, 15 August	Swan Districts 20.22 (142)	def.	South Fremantle 18.14 (122)	Bassendean Oval (crowd: 3891)
Saturday, 15 August	Subiaco 19.13 (127)	def.	Perth 10.8 (68)	Subiaco Oval (crowd: 3498)
Saturday, 15 August	East Perth 8.9 (57)	def. by	Claremont 33.28 (226)	WACA (crowd: 2469)
Saturday, 15 August	East Fremantle 23.15 (153)	def.	West Perth 12.15 (87)	East Fremantle Oval (crowd: 4813)
A superb second half scoring 17.6 (108) to 5.5 (35) gives the flagging Sharks a major boost in confidence, as Peake returns to score five goals at full-forward and young Brad Tunbridge dominates the ruck.; With Ralph kicking nine goals nine behinds and young Pyke eight goals as a rover, Claremont kick the highest score against the Royals and inflict the blue and black's worst-ever defeat.

=== Round 21 ===
	Round 21
Saturday, 22 August	West Perth 10.14 (74)	def. by	Subiaco 22.13 (145)	Leederville Oval (crowd: 5132)
Saturday, 22 August	Perth 17.9 (111)	def. by	Swan Districts 20.19 (139)	WACA (crowd: 4218)
Saturday, 22 August	South Fremantle 12.12 (84)	def. by	Claremont 22.13 (145)	Fremantle Oval (crowd: 3297)
Saturday, 22 August	East Perth 17.17 (119)	def.	East Fremantle 12.7 (79)	Perth Oval (crowd: 2211)
Todd Breman kicked ten goals for Subiaco, reaching 101 goals for the season.; East Perth – last the whole season – avoid the wooden spoon with a fairytale victory for the retiring Peter Spencer, who was best afield despite having to play with headgear and protective padding.

== Ladder ==
1987 WAFL ladder
Pos	Team	Pld	W	L	D	PF	PA	PP	Pts
1	Claremont (P)	21	19	1	1	2692	1695	158.8	78
2	Subiaco	21	14	6	1	2491	1948	127.9	58
3	East Fremantle	21	13	8	0	2599	2080	125.0	52
4	Swan Districts	21	13	8	0	2259	2223	101.6	52
5	West Perth	21	11	10	0	2244	2250	99.7	44
6	Perth	21	6	15	0	2023	2473	81.8	24
7	East Perth	21	4	17	0	1953	2891	67.6	16
8	South Fremantle	21	3	18	0	2127	2828	75.2	12

Rules for classification: 1) points; 2) percentage; 3) number of points for.
(P) Premiers

== Finals ==
=== First semi-final ===
	First semi-final
Saturday, 29 August	East Fremantle 19.24 (138)	def.	Swan Districts 11.16 (82)	Subiaco Oval (crowd: 14,872)
Despite losing Peake to a calf strain, East Fremantle – underdogs after losing seven of their last twelve matches – upset the fancied Swans, who lose all control after an inaccurate 3.7 (25) when they dominated play in the opening quarter.

=== Second semi-final ===
	Second semi-final
Saturday, 5 September	Claremont 19.11 (125)	def.	Subiaco 7.13 (55)	Subiaco Oval (crowd: 16,877)
Claremont make it twenty straight undefeated matches with a superb first-half defensive display that allows Subiaco only one goal until the 12-minute mark of the third quarter.; Warren Ralph kicked ten straight goals to three-quarter time, including five into the wind in the second quarter, but Joe Ahmat was forced to kick one himself when he wanted Ralph to beat Bennett's WA(N)FL finals record from the previous season, and late in the quarter Ralph kicked his only behind from a difficult angle.

=== Preliminary final ===
	Preliminary final
Saturday, 12 September	Subiaco 17.14 (116)	def.	East Fremantle 11.12 (78)	Subiaco Oval (crowd: 13,785)
With Peake back, East Fremantle fall into their 1986 Grand Final trap of excessively physical and undisciplined play – the Lions score nine goals in the first quarter and East Fremantle never get into the match, with veteran Featherby scoring five goals.

=== Grand Final ===
1987 WAFL Grand Final
Saturday, 19 September	Claremont	def.	Subiaco	Subiaco Oval (crowd: 32,340)
3.5 (23); 11.8 (74); 16.13 (109); 20.20 (140)	Q1; Q2; Q3; Final	2.2 (14); 4.3 (27); 6.8 (44); 10.9 (69)	Umpires: Phil O‘Reilly, Grant Vernon
Ralph 4, Thorne 4, Kickett 3, Sutherland 3, David O‘Connell 2, Golding 2, Melesso, Pyke	Goals	Breman 5, Dargie 2, Featherby, Hutchinson, Georgiades
Thorne, Pyke, Beers, Klemm, Sutherland, Ralph	Best	Neil Taylor, Hutchinson, Brian Taylor, Breman, Wilkinson, Willet
Claremont complete a record season with a crushing win, producing ultimately fulfilled expectations of a "golden era" under Neesham.
