= 1992 WAFL season =

Australian rules football season

- Teams: 8
- Premiers: East Fremantle; 27th premiership
- Minor premiers: East Fremantle; 31st minor premiership
- Sandover Medallist: Robbie West (West Perth)
- Bernie Naylor Medallist: Craig Edwards (South Fremantle); Kevin Caton (Swan Districts)
- Matches played: 90

The 1992 WAFL season was the 108th season of senior football in Perth, Western Australia. It is most notable for the end of the Claremont dynasty of the previous five seasons, which was pre-season an expected result of losing all but nine of the premiership side to the AFL draft or, in two cases, retirement. The Tigers, whose guernsey reverted from the gold sash to the CFC monogram, which they wore during their miraculous premiership success in 1964, fell from first with only two losses to avoiding the wooden spoon only by percentage, in the process using fifty-two players in the league team. East Fremantle won their first premiership for seven years after a very disappointing 1991, whilst East Perth, who had been stragglers for the preceding half-decade, made a remarkable rush from fifth position (after being outside the five for most of the season) to narrowly miss their first Grand Final since winning the 1978 premiership.

After Ian Dargie's drought-breaking Sandover win for Subiaco in 1991, West Perth, despite suffering the rare ignominy of finishing last in all three grades (Note: The only other clubs to finish last in all three grades since 1957 have been Peel Thunder in their inaugural 1997 season, and Swan Districts in 1988. No club would win premierships in all three grades until Subiaco in 2018 won all three premierships.) and having their colts lose fifteen matches in succession after winning their first six, ended the second-longest club drought in Sandover history with the Falcons' first win since Brian Foley in 1959.

Off the field, the WAFL was hit by the unwillingness of financially crippled Perth to accept relocation to Kelmscott as an integral part of its future development plan – indeed there was an aggressive debate during the pre-season about whether Perth or East Perth should have been the team to make this move. The reluctance of West Perth to move to the northwestern suburbs despite incentive payments from the WAFL totalling $390,000 also affected the league, although unlike the Demons West Perth announced mid-season they would move to Joondalup for 1994.

== Home-and-away season ==
=== Round 1 ===
	Round 1
Saturday, 4 April (2:15 pm)	South Fremantle 17.12 (114)	def.	Perth 12.10 (82)	Fremantle Oval (crowd: 3545)
Saturday, 4 April (2:15 pm)	West Perth 13.20 (98)	def.	East Perth 13.12 (90)	Leederville Oval (crowd: 3099)
Saturday, 4 April (2:15 pm)	Claremont 17.13 (115)	def.	Subiaco 13.8 (86)	Claremont Oval (crowd: 2771)
Saturday, 4 April (2:15 pm)	Swan Districts 16.12 (108)	def.	East Fremantle 10.10 (70)	Bassendean Oval (crowd: 3299)
Despite fielding only eight of their 1991 premiership players, Gerard Neesham's unique coaching methods rub off on the new faces for a convincing victory in the "replay".

=== Round 2 ===
	Round 2
Saturday, 11 April (2:15 pm)	Subiaco 18.17 (125)	def.	West Perth 8.12 (60)	Subiaco Oval (crowd: 2973)
Saturday, 11 April (2:15 pm)	East Perth 20.13 (133)	def.	Swan Districts 14.16 (100)	Perth Oval (crowd: 2893)
Saturday, 11 April (2:15 pm)	East Fremantle 9.17 (71)	def. by	South Fremantle 11.12 (78)	East Fremantle Oval (crowd: 5721)
Saturday, 11 April (2:15 pm)	Perth 21.13 (139)	def.	Claremont 12.14 (86)	Lathlain Park (crowd: 2588)
Half-forward Lloyd Haskett, who had not played since 1989 due to two shoulder reconstructions, demolishes pre-season premiership favourite Swan Districts with six goals for a forward line expected to be weak following the retirement of Glen Bartlett and Ken Seymour.; Perth, led by North Melbourne discard Stephen Pears, end the equal third-longest winning streak in open-age WA(N)FL football (Note: Beaten by East Fremantle between mid-1945 and early 1947 and by East Perth between the 1958 preliminary final and the seventeenth round of 1959. Subiaco has since beaten Claremont's feat three times – with 25 consecutive wins encompassing their perfect season of 2018 and the first five games of 2019, and with two sequences of 19 consecutive wins in 2006–2007 and 2017.) by inflicting Claremont's first defeat since Round 6 of 1991.The defeat was Claremont's heaviest since losing by 62 points in the 1988 Grand Final.; Former soccer player Marty Atkins uses his skills from that sport to overpower East Fremantle's attack in perfect conditions, consistently keeping the Sharks out in a close game.

=== Round 3 ===
	Round 3
Saturday, 18 April (2:15 pm)	Swan Districts 16.15 (111)	def.	West Perth 7.8 (50)	Bassendean Oval (crowd: 2897)
Saturday, 18 April (2:15 pm)	South Fremantle 11.15 (81)	def. by	East Perth 15.16 (106)	Fremantle Oval (crowd: 3500)
Saturday, 18 April (2:15 pm)	Perth 17.16 (118)	def.	Subiaco 13.13 (91)	Lathlain Park (crowd: 2529)
Saturday, 18 April (2:15 pm)	Claremont 10.8 (68)	def. by	East Fremantle 12.16 (88)	Claremont Oval (crowd: 2274)
Mal Brown, after seeing his reserves win 33.25 (223) to 2.6 (18), rues many selection choices as the previously unbeaten Bulldogs completely lack determination against the unfancied Royals.; Steve Lally, one of the smallest players in the WAFL, picks up ten kicks in the third quarter to turn a 29-point deficit into a surprise victory, leaving no team unbeaten after three rounds.

=== Round 4 (Anzac Day weekend) ===
	Round 4
Saturday, 25 April (2:15 pm)	Swan Districts 19.16 (130)	def.	Subiaco 15.9 (99)	WACA (crowd: 4144)
Monday, 27 April (2:15 pm)	West Perth 10.10 (70)	def. by	South Fremantle 17.14 (116)	Leederville Oval (crowd: 3369)
Monday, 27 April (2:15 pm)	East Fremantle 13.12 (90)	def.	Perth 7.11 (53)	East Fremantle Oval (crowd: 4194)
Monday, 27 April (2:15 pm)	East Perth 8.15 (63)	def.	Claremont 7.11 (53)	Perth Oval (crowd: 3808)
Three of the matches this round were played on the Monday, which was a holiday owing to Anzac Day falling on a Saturday.; East Perth show the cupboard at Claremont as finally bare with a tough win in a low-scoring game where the Tigers' young and inexperienced forwards completely fail to convert.; East Fremantle coach Judge, seeing Perth as the "form side" of the league, completely shadows the Demons' dangerous on-ball division and makes it almost impossible to move the ball forward.

=== Round 5 ===
	Round 5
Friday, 1 May (6:45 pm)	Perth 18.11 (119)	def.	West Perth 10.18 (78)	WACA (crowd: 3070)
Saturday, 2 May (2:15 pm)	Subiaco 8.12 (60)	def. by	South Fremantle 19.19 (133)	Subiaco Oval (crowd: 3026)
Saturday, 2 May (2:15 pm)	East Fremantle 15.17 (107)	def.	East Perth 8.7 (55)	East Fremantle Oval (crowd: 3500)
Saturday, 2 May (2:15 pm)	Claremont 6.15 (51)	def. by	Swan Districts 15.20 (110)	Claremont Oval (crowd: 3280)
Injured Eagle Peter Wilson, only on Thursday cleared to play after major shoulder surgery, produces a sizzling display as East Fremantle for the second week running thrash a supposed "boom" team.; After Claremont's fourth consecutive loss it is speculated on the Sunday that coach Neesham will return as a player at the age of 37, but he denies the rumour and does not do so.

=== Round 6 ===
	Round 6
Saturday, 9 May (2:15 pm)	Swan Districts 13.19 (97)	def.	Perth 11.15 (81)	Bassendean Oval (crowd: 3456)
Saturday, 9 May (2:15 pm)	East Perth 16.15 (111)	def. by	Subiaco 19.12 (126)	Perth Oval (crowd: 2731)
Saturday, 9 May (2:15 pm)	South Fremantle 11.10 (76)	def. by	Claremont 14.7 (91)	Fremantle Oval (crowd: 3863)
Saturday, 9 May (2:15 pm)	West Perth 9.8 (62)	def. by	East Fremantle 20.15 (135)	Leederville Oval (crowd: 2424)
East Fremantle's 73-point margin is their biggest ever at Leederville Oval, though 55 points short of their biggest win over the Falcons.; Teenage rover Matt Connell, with an amazing 43 possessions, sparks Subiaco after the Lions, going into the game with one win out of five, were thirty points behind at half-time.; Five goals in time-on of the third quarter gives Claremont a morale-boosting victory to end a run of four defeats.

=== Round 7 ===
	Round 7
Friday, 15 May (6:45 pm)	West Perth 15.11 (101)	def.	Claremont 11.8 (74)	WACA (crowd: 2160)
Saturday, 16 May (2:15 pm)	South Fremantle 16.10 (106)	def.	Swan Districts 10.16 (76)	Fremantle Oval (crowd: 3395)
Saturday, 16 May (2:15 pm)	Perth 13.15 (93)	def. by	East Perth 21.9 (135)	Lathlain Park (crowd: 2292)
Saturday, 16 May (2:15 pm)	Subiaco 13.12 (90)	def. by	East Fremantle 16.11 (107)	Subiaco Oval (crowd: 2302)
Paul Harding, recruited from St. Kilda to improve the Eagles' ruck strength, performs so well for East Fremantle at centre half-forward that there are suggestions he should play there at AFL level.

=== Round 8 ===
	Round 8
Saturday, 23 May (2:15 pm)	Perth 16.14 (110)	def.	South Fremantle 14.13 (97)	Lathlain Park (crowd: 2241)
Saturday, 23 May (2:15 pm)	East Perth 20.12 (132)	def.	West Perth 12.12 (84)	Perth Oval (crowd: 2194)
Saturday, 23 May (2:15 pm)	Subiaco 16.11 (107)	def.	Claremont 11.16 (82)	Subiaco Oval (crowd: 3086)
Saturday, 23 May (2:15 pm)	East Fremantle 19.19 (133)	def.	Swan Districts 6.8 (44)	East Fremantle Oval (crowd: 2582)
Former Hawthorn reserves player Damian Condon, along with George christie playing for the first time since 1990, demolishes Swan Districts full-forward Kevin Caton (who scores only one behind) as East Fremantle crush the Swans in the biggest win of the 1992 home-and-away season.; 27-year-old Boulder City wingman Brad George, in his first league match after over 100 as a bush nomad, becomes a vital cog as Perth come from 27 points down at half-time to beat the fancied Bulldogs.

=== Round 9 ===
	Round 9
Saturday, 30 May (2:15 pm)	West Perth 10.16 (76)	def. by	Subiaco 20.18 (138)	Leederville Oval (crowd: 2772)
Saturday, 30 May (2:15 pm)	Claremont 13.15 (93)	def.	Perth 12.11 (83)	Claremont Oval (crowd: 2170)
Monday, 1 June (2:15 pm)	Swan Districts 21.15 (141)	def.	East Perth 9.17 (71)	Bassendean Oval (crowd: 7939)
Monday, 1 June (2:15 pm)	South Fremantle 12.19 (91)	def.	East Fremantle 10.11 (71)	Fremantle Oval (crowd: 18130)
John Georgiades is best afield as a half-back flanker patching up the depleted Lion defence, leaving the club 1 percent from fifth position.; An altercation over the quality of umpiring between veteran umpire Phil O‘Reilly and long-time Tigers' member Doug Ringhalt dominates discussion of Claremont's third win for 1992.; After a thrilling local derby for three and a half quarters, South Fremantle, strengthened by the return of Eagle regular David Hart from injury, went away to comfortably end the Sharks' winning run.; The biggest WAFL home-and-away crowd since the fifth round of 1987 leads to three thousand fans being locked out when Fremantle Oval is declared full, but eventually admitted amidst the pandemonium.

=== Round 10 ===
	Round 10
Saturday, 6 June (2:15 pm)	West Perth 17.19 (121)	def. by	Swan Districts 23.13 (151)	Leederville Oval (crowd: 2565)
Saturday, 6 June (2:15 pm)	East Perth 9.11 (65)	def. by	South Fremantle 16.10 (106)	Perth Oval (crowd: 3051)
Saturday, 6 June (2:15 pm)	Subiaco 15.11 (101)	def.	Perth 12.11 (83)	Subiaco Oval (crowd: 2565)
Saturday, 6 June (2:15 pm)	East Fremantle 9.16 (70)	def.	Claremont 10.8 (68)	East Fremantle Oval (crowd: 2974)
Scott Cummings kicks six goals in a fine debut to ward off lowly West Perth, but coach John Todd is very wary of having found a long-term star.; 24-year-old former colts player Ashley Clementi shows he retains his junior form in a fine league debut for South Fremantle, for whom Wally Matera and Brad Collard collected seventy possessions between them.

=== Round 11 ===
	Round 11
Friday, 12 June (6:45 pm)	West Perth 12.19 (91)	def.	South Fremantle 9.12 (66)	WACA (crowd: 2329)
Saturday, 13 June (2:15 pm)	Swan Districts 17.12 (114)	def.	Subiaco 17.14 (116)	Bassendean Oval (crowd: 2800)
Saturday, 13 June (2:15 pm)	Perth 16.17 (113)	def. by	East Fremantle 20.14 (134)	Lathlain Park (crowd: 3500)
Saturday, 13 June (2:15 pm)	Claremont 14.11 (95)	def. by	East Perth 16.9 (105)	Claremont Oval (crowd: 2100)
Led by star ruck-rover Robbie West, West Perth show their preference for night football – leading to jokes about moving to Subiaco – in a major upset over the second-placed Bulldogs in slippery conditions.; Bill Moneghan, playing for the first time after a major knee reconstructions, moves from defence to centre half-forward to drive Subiaco to a brilliant victory with only eighteen fit players from thirty-four points behind halfway through the third quarter.; Despite eight goals from youngster Chris Gerreyn, Shane Evans as a leading centre half-forward and former Fitzroy player Craig McGrath in the goal square are too much for the Tigers in a keenly fought match.

=== Round 12 ===
	Round 12
Saturday, 20 June (2:15 pm)	South Fremantle 17.20 (122)	def.	Subiaco 11.15 (81)	Fremantle Oval (crowd: 2195)
Saturday, 20 June (2:15 pm)	West Perth 13.15 (93)	def. by	Perth 21.9 (135)	Leederville Oval (crowd: 1708)
Saturday, 20 June (2:15 pm)	East Perth 16.6 (102)	def. by	East Fremantle 15.13 (103)	Perth Oval (crowd: 1428)
Saturday, 20 June (2:15 pm)	Swan Districts 11.17 (83)	def. by	Claremont 14.13 (97)	Bassendean Oval (crowd: 2462)
East Fremantle's comeback from 45 points down at three-quarter time to win is the fourth-biggest in WA(N)FL history and at the time the biggest since 1964.; Hard and uncompromising Demon defenders Shane Renfree and Warren Nicholas temporarily solve the club's key forward woes, kicking nine goals between them in the final 45 minutes as Perth score 15.3 (93) to 5.5 (35).; Midfielder Mat Eliot, in only his twelfth match, drives an inexperienced Claremont to a fine victory over a Swans team that scores only four goals to three-quarter time.

=== Round 13 ===
	Round 13
Saturday, 27 June (2:15 pm)	Perth 12.11 (83)	def.	Swan Districts 10.17 (77)	Lathlain Park (crowd: 1636)
Saturday, 27 June (2:15 pm)	Subiaco 6.11 (47)	def. by	East Perth 9.5 (59)	Subiaco Oval (crowd: 1798)
Saturday, 27 June (2:15 pm)	Claremont 9.11 (65)	def. by	South Fremantle 10.13 (73)	Claremont Oval (crowd: 1463)
Saturday, 27 June (2:15 pm)	East Fremantle 10.12 (72)	def.	West Perth 7.7 (49)	East Fremantle Oval (crowd: 1510)
A magnificent goal from captain Merv Kelly against a howling gale in torrential rain allows Perth to overcome the loss of six regular players to the flu and inflict the third straight loss upon Swan Districts – whose players do not adapt to the conditions.; First-gamer Paul Barnard kicks two crucial goals – one with his first kick in WAFL football – as East Perth come from twenty points behind at half-time to win well in very tough conditions.

=== Round 14 ===
	Round 14
Saturday, 4 July (2:15 pm)	Swan Districts 18.14 (122)	def.	South Fremantle 10.13 (73)	Bassendean Oval (crowd: 2919)
Saturday, 4 July (2:15 pm)	East Perth 13.13 (91)	def. by	Perth 17.11 (113)	Perth Oval (crowd: 2071)
Saturday, 4 July (2:15 pm)	West Perth 13.8 (86)	def.	Claremont 9.8 (62)	Leederville Oval (crowd: 1743)
Saturday, 4 July (2:15 pm)	Subiaco 17.18 (120)	def.	East Fremantle 15.7 (97)	Subiaco Oval (crowd: 2278)
East Perth coach Stan Magro is faced with a $500 fine after saying the umpiring of Ray Zoch and Peter Repper was "deplorable" – despite admitting they did not cost the Royals the match.; The coach of former Swan defender Stan Nowotny provides young Scott Hardy, in his first WAFL match, with the skills to push Swans' running brigade to overrun South Fremantle with nine final-quarter goals.; Young Darren Harris complements West and ruckman Nelson to lead West Perth to an upset win in slippery conditions over a Claremont team declared by Neesham to be at "its lowest level in fifteen years".

=== Round 15 ===
	Round 15
Saturday, 11 July (2:15 pm)	South Fremantle 15.11 (101)	def.	Perth 10.9 (69)	Fremantle Oval (crowd: 3226)
Saturday, 11 July (2:15 pm)	East Perth 10.14 (74)	def.	West Perth 9.8 (62)	Wanneroo (crowd: 2773)
Saturday, 11 July (2:15 pm)	Claremont 13.12 (90)	def. by	Subiaco 14.11 (95)	Claremont Oval (crowd: 2249)
Saturday, 11 July (2:15 pm)	Swan Districts 13.8 (86)	def. by	East Fremantle 19.17 (131)	Bassendean Oval (crowd: 3354)
A depleted Perth drops from fourth to sixth in a game described by South Fremantle coach Mal Brown as the lowest-standard game of the season.

=== Round 16 ===
	Round 16
Saturday, 18 July (2:15 pm)	Subiaco 24.11 (155)	def.	West Perth 12.13 (85)	Subiaco Oval (crowd: 2199)
Saturday, 18 July (2:15 pm)	East Perth 17.8 (110)	def. by	Swan Districts 20.15 (135)	Perth Oval (crowd: 2302)
Saturday, 18 July (2:15 pm)	East Fremantle 15.11 (101)	def. by	South Fremantle 22.11 (143)	East Fremantle Oval (crowd: 7401)
Saturday, 18 July (2:15 pm)	Perth 12.11 (83)	def. by	Claremont 23.16 (154)	Lathlain Park (crowd: 2235)
Subiaco pile on fourteen goals to two after a close first two-and-a-half quarters as young "Spider" Burton combines with the returning Phil Scott to crush the Falcons, who are left a game and 19 percent clear on the bottom.; Claremont's Phil Gilbert kicks six goals after half-time in the unfamiliar role of full-forward to give the Tigers a crushing victory, but misses the rest of 1992 after breaking his jaw in a collision with teammate Brian Sutherland.

=== Round 17 ===
	Round 17
Saturday, 25 July (2:15 pm)	Swan Districts 13.16 (94)	def.	West Perth 13.11 (89)	Bassendean Oval (crowd: 2011)
Saturday, 25 July (2:15 pm)	South Fremantle 15.14 (104)	def.	East Perth 13.10 (88)	Fremantle Oval (crowd: 2367)
Saturday, 25 July (2:15 pm)	Perth 21.14 (140)	def.	Subiaco 8.10 (58)	Kelmscott (crowd: 1675)
Saturday, 25 July (2:15 pm)	Claremont 9.8 (62)	def. by	East Fremantle 16.18 (114)	Claremont Oval (crowd: 1754)
Michael Broadbridge, controversially named as Swan Districts' deputy-vice-captain, shows his leadership skill by staving off an upset in time-on after West Perth kicked six unanswered goals in the first 25 minutes of the final quarter to be eight points ahead.; Free-running play by the likes of Shane Renfree, Steven Lally, Russell Thompson, Brendon Baker and Darren Rigby leads Perth back into the five as young Toby Jackson shadows the powerful Subiaco following division.

=== Round 18 ===
	Round 18
Saturday, 1 August (2:15 pm)	Subiaco 23.22 (160)	def.	Swan Districts 11.8 (74)	Subiaco Oval (crowd: 2878)
Saturday, 1 August (2:15 pm)	West Perth 15.9 (99)	def.	South Fremantle 13.18 (96)	Leederville Oval (crowd: 1999)
Saturday, 1 August (2:15 pm)	East Fremantle 21.9 (135)	def.	Perth 11.16 (82)	East Fremantle Oval (crowd: 2388)
Saturday, 1 August (2:15 pm)	East Perth 9.11 (65)	def. by	Claremont 16.12 (108)	Perth Oval (crowd: 2011)
Demoted Eagle Phil Scott produces a breathtaking display as Subiaco, five goals behind at quarter-time, kick 23.19 (157) in the last three quarters, including fifteen unanswered goals from shortly after half-time.; Trent Nichols, after a talk with Eagle coach Michael Malthouse, plays an amazingly tough game with a shin splint, as East Fremantle move a game clear on top again.

=== Round 19 ===
	Round 19
Saturday, 8 August (2:15 pm)	Subiaco 9.12 (66)	def. by	South Fremantle 14.10 (94)	Subiaco Oval (crowd: 2212)
Saturday, 8 August (2:15 pm)	Perth 9.14 (68)	def. by	West Perth 20.12 (132)	Lathlain Park (crowd: 1854)
Saturday, 8 August (2:15 pm)	East Fremantle 12.12 (84)	def. by	East Perth 12.16 (88)	East Fremantle Oval (crowd: 1905)
Saturday, 8 August (2:15 pm)	Claremont 11.15 (81)	def. by	Swan Districts 14.12 (96)	Claremont Oval (crowd: 1874)
Former defender Anthony Stubberfield relishes a move by Royal coach Magro to attack as, kicking 4.2 (26), he becomes the focal point in a victory that effectively seals East Perth's place in the five.; West Perth tagger Ric Toovey controls Demon dangerman Adrian Barich and West Perth's on-ball division runs over the Demons – giving the Falcons a chance to avoid a third straight wooden spoon.

=== Round 20 ===
	Round 20
Saturday, 15 August (2:15 pm)	Swan Districts 15.15 (105)	def.	Perth 6.8 (44)	Bassendean Oval (crowd: 2015)
Saturday, 15 August (2:15 pm)	East Perth 10.6 (66)	def. by	Subiaco 22.13 (145)	Perth Oval (crowd: 1657)
Saturday, 15 August (2:15 pm)	South Fremantle 14.19 (103)	def.	Claremont 8.8 (56)	Fremantle Oval (crowd: 2251)
Saturday, 15 August (2:15 pm)	West Perth 12.12 (84)	def.	East Fremantle 7.9 (51)	Leederville Oval (crowd: 1908)
South Fremantle take top position via a win in weather so wet and dark switching the newly-installed lights on was considered.; West Perth show how well they have developed under Gieschen with a convincing wet-weather win as Robbie West – who dominated player-of-the year award as few others have done but failed to break into the Eagles' team – completely controls the packs and moves the Falcons from last place for the first time since Round 3.; An undisciplined and disarranged East Perth team nonetheless remains safe in the five with Perth's loss to Swan Districts, despite awful play epitomised by giving Subiaco two gift goals from 50-metre penalties.

=== Round 21 ===
	Round 21
Friday, 21 August (6:45 pm)	South Fremantle 13.9 (87)	def. by	Swan Districts 19.12 (126)	Fremantle Oval (crowd: 9067)
Saturday, 22 August (2:15 pm)	Perth 12.19 (91)	def. by	East Perth 15.13 (103)	Lathlain Park (crowd: 3701)
Saturday, 22 August (2:15 pm)	Claremont 15.15 (105)	def.	West Perth 12.14 (86)	Claremont Oval (crowd: 2562)
Saturday, 22 August (2:15 pm)	East Fremantle 26.13 (169)	def.	Subiaco 12.13 (85)	East Fremantle Oval (crowd: 2955)
A bumper crowd attends the first night match at Fremantle Oval and sees Swan Districts convincingly seal the double chance.; Wingman John Lawrence, after an impressive first half, switches to half-forward and demolishes Subiaco with four third-quarter goals to return the Sharks to premiership favoritism. Subiaco rested five key players after Swan Districts' win meant they could not reach third position.; Claremont avoid becoming the first team since 1916 to fall from premiers to wooden spooners with a hard-fought win led by the experienced Tony Begovich who used all his speed and skill despite a horror injury run.

== Ladder ==
1992 WAFL ladder
Pos	Team	Pld	W	L	D	PF	PA	PP	Pts
1	East Fremantle (P)	21	14	7	0	2133	1731	123.2	56
2	South Fremantle	21	14	7	0	2060	1766	116.6	56
3	Swan Districts	21	13	8	0	2180	1986	109.8	52
4	Subiaco	21	11	10	0	2151	2125	101.2	44
5	East Perth	21	10	11	0	1912	2076	92.1	40
6	Perth	21	8	13	0	1982	2165	91.5	32
7	Claremont	21	7	14	0	1756	1912	91.8	28
8	West Perth	21	7	14	0	1756	2169	81.0	28

Rules for classification: 1) points; 2) percentage; 3) number of points for.
(P) Premiers

== Finals ==
=== Elimination and Qualifying Finals ===
	Elimination Final
Saturday, 29 August (11:45 am)	Subiaco 10.12 (72)	def. by	East Perth 24.13 (157)	Subiaco Oval (crowd: 12,366)
East Perth kick 15.9 (99) to 3.4 (22) after an even first half to thrash a sorry Subiaco – in coach Haydn Bunton junior's last match in Western Australia – as rover Heath East equals Graham Melrose' 1980 feat of kicking nine goals.

	Qualifying Final
Saturday, 29 August (2:45 pm)	South Fremantle 22.19 (151)	def.	Swan Districts 8.11 (59)	Subiaco Oval (crowd: 12,366)
Since the two finals were played at the same venue on the same day, the attendance figure is the same.; Dean Irving nullifies young Swans ruckman Travis Edmonds and South Fremantle's smaller players run riot with thirteen of fourteen goals from midway through the opening quarter to gain revenge for their last-round defeat.

=== Semi-finals ===
	First semi-final
Saturday, 5 September (11:45 am)	Swan Districts 12.9 (81)	def. by	East Perth 13.14 (92)	Subiaco Oval (crowd: 15,284)
East Perth stand up to the "acid test" by twice jumping to a four-goal lead and holding off Swans challenges.

	Second semi-final
Saturday, 5 September (2:45 pm)	East Fremantle 8.9 (57)	def. by	South Fremantle 11.16 (82)	Subiaco Oval (crowd: 15,284)
Since the two finals were played at the same venue on the same day, the attendance figure is the same.; South Fremantle firm to premiership favourites with a fourth solid win – built on speed – over an East Fremantle team flattered by the scoreline due to the Bulldogs' inaccuracy in front of goal.

=== Preliminary final ===
	Preliminary final
Saturday, 12 September (2:45 pm)	East Fremantle 14.13 (97)	def.	East Perth 14.9 (93)	Subiaco Oval (crowd: 12,490)
Perth reject Ian Newman fills the big-man "hole" in East Fremantle's team, winning 40 hit-outs and working tirelessly into the wind in the final quarter.

=== Grand Final ===
1992 WAFL Grand Final
Saturday, 19 September (2:45 pm)	South Fremantle	def. by	East Fremantle	Subiaco Oval (crowd: 30,130)
2.6 (18); 4.6 (30); 9.10 (64); 9.13 (67)	Q1; Q2; Q3; Final	1.8 (14); 6.14 (50); 7.16 (58); 12.19 (91)	Umpires: Trevor Garrett, Greg Scroop; Simpson Medal: Clinton Browning (East Fremantle)
Hepburn 3, Wally Matera, Williams, Herman, Clifford Collard, Campbell, Flugge	Goals	Lockyer 2, Billy Krakouer 2, Neil Lester-Smith 2, Condon, Amaranti, Jeff Davidson, Newman, Nichols, Malaxos
Fimmano, Bradley Collard, Hynes, Hepburn, Grant, Sundtan	Best	Bilcich, Newman, Browning, Malaxos, Nichols, Condon, Moss
Craig Edwards for charging Neil Lester-Smith	Reports
East Fremantle produce a major upset on a grey and windy day, shutting down South Fremantle's "engine room", while former spearhead Browning restricts leading goalkicker Edwards to 0.1 (1) and claims the Simpson Medal.
