= 1989 WAFL season =

Australian rules football season

- Teams: 8
- Premiers: Claremont; 7th premiership
- Minor premiers: Claremont; 8th minor premiership
- Sandover Medallist: Craig Edwards (South Fremantle)
- Bernie Naylor Medallist: Neil Lester-Smith (East Fremantle)
- Matches played: 89

The 1989 WAFL season was the 105th season of senior football in Perth. It saw Claremont continue its dominance of the competition with a third successive minor premiership under Gerard Neesham, despite having lost most of their top players of previous seasons to the VFL, and their 1988 conquerors Subiaco fall to third last with a mere six wins – their worst performance since the dark days of 1983 when the club had not played in the finals for nine years and had been wooden spooners four times in eight seasons. Coach Bunton had to promote many young players and knew 1989 was to be a year of rebuilding, though only a second (and last as of 2014) Colts premiership under Eddie Pitter showed Subiaco did possess much resilience.

Perth, who in 1988 had had their best record since 1978 and returned to Lathlain Park after the experiment of playing at their pre-1959 home of the WACA Ground was regarded as a financial failure, were also severely disappointing. Swan Districts, who in 1988 had become the first club to suffer the ignominy of being last in all three grades, (Note: The only other clubs to finish last in all three grades since 1957 have been Peel Thunder in their inaugural 1997 season, and West Perth in 1992. No club would win premierships in all three grades until Subiaco in 2018 won all three premierships.) rebounded so well despite the absence of Narkle that after thirteen rounds they were certainties for the four before a run of wins by West Perth coincided with a Swan slump and allowed the Falcons to reach the finals for only the third time in eleven seasons.

The season saw two experimental matches played in outer suburbs so that the WAFL could assess the possibility of relocating financially crippled Perth and West Perth to the Perth Hills and the growing northwestern corridor respectively. The former move never occurred due to dissent within the committee, the latter did however five years subsequently.

Another first was the semi-finals double-header that was to become standard in the league during the 1990s, instigated due to the only senior finals tie since the 1938 Grand Final and the refusal of Claremont and South Fremantle to accept two weekends without a match. Although a game on Saturday and one on Sunday was proposed, the first semi-final replay was ultimately played before the second semi on the Saturday. (Note: As with the AFL, WAFL/Westar finals have since 1991 been required to play extra time if drawn at full-time, though this has never actually occurred.) There were also suggestions for the first time of the WAFL expanding beyond Perth to such rural centres as Bunbury and Geraldton and that established Perth clubs merge in order to adapt to the new realities of a national VFL/AFL competition.

A more pressing issue was the off-field debate between Indian Pacific (Note: the holders of the Eagles' VFL licence) and the WAFL over the running of football in Western Australia, with Indian Pacific demanding an independent West Australian Football Commission rather than one controlled by the WAFL which was felt to be depressing standards. The dispute after the VFL allowed West Coast to field a reserves team in exchange for a larger list continued: the VFL wanted West Coast's reserves playing in the VFL/AFL reserve grade competition, but that was unacceptable to the WAFC due to the cost of moving extra players to Melbourne, whilst the WAFC's preferred option of a West Coast reserves team in the WAFL was not acceptable to WAFL club executives as it would upset the tried-and-proved WAFL structure. (Note: The Eagles would eventually field a reserves team in the WAFL for the 2019 season.)

== Home-and-away season ==
=== Round 1 ===
| | Round 1 |
| Saturday, 8 April | West Perth 13.12 (90) | def. by | South Fremantle 19.19 (133) | Leederville Oval (crowd: 4300) |
| Saturday, 8 April | Swan Districts 23.8 (146) | def. | Perth 16.9 (105) | Bassendean Oval (crowd: 4100) |
| Saturday, 8 April | Subiaco 5.14 (44) | def. by | Claremont 17.11 (113) | Subiaco Oval (crowd: 5000) |
| Saturday, 8 April | East Fremantle 23.17 (155) | def. | East Perth 9.10 (64) | East Fremantle Oval (crowd: 4300) |
The return in the reserves of injury-plagued Andrew Macnish proves the sole highlight for Subiaco in the Grand Final replay – the Lions' league team minus Breman and Georgiades has absolutely no target in attack.

=== Round 2 ===
| | Round 2 |
| Saturday, 15 April | East Perth 10.11 (71) | def. by | Swan Districts 17.16 (118) | WACA (crowd: 4267) |
| Saturday, 15 April | Perth 9.14 (68) | def. by | Subiaco 15.17 (107) | Lathlain Park (crowd: 4398) |
| Saturday, 15 April | Claremont 15.23 (113) | def. | West Perth 10.11 (71) | Claremont Oval (crowd: 3720) |
| Saturday, 15 April | South Fremantle 16.19 (115) | def. | East Fremantle 13.19 (97) | Fremantle Oval (crowd: 9358) |
Sixteen-year-old Glen Jakovich kicks five goals to combine with Stevan Jackson in an impressive attack that East Fremantle cannot counter despite Jackson's severely inaccurate total of 1.5 (11).; The move of former centreman/defender Troy Ugle to the forward line and veteran defender Don Langsford onto the ball sparks 1988 wooden spooners Swans to equal top position with a ten-goal-to-two second half.

=== Round 3 ===
| | Round 3 |
| Saturday, 22 April | West Perth 18.15 (123) | def. | East Perth 14.15 (99) | Leederville Oval (crowd: 3440) |
| Saturday, 22 April | Claremont 19.24 (138) | def. | Swan Districts 14.8 (92) | Claremont Oval (crowd: 4200) |
| Saturday, 22 April | Perth 13.19 (97) | def. by | East Fremantle 27.27 (189) | Kelmscott (crowd: 3601) |
| Sunday, 23 April | Subiaco 16.15 (111) | def. by | South Fremantle 17.15 (117) | Kalgoorlie (crowd: 4000) |
With Perth considering a move to the southeastern Perth Hills, the WAFL plays a game in Kelmscott, but the Demons already look out of the running for the four after being expected contenders before the season started – they were never in the hunt after missing six consecutive shots late in the first quarter.; The encouragement of fiancée Theresa helps Chris Davies return to West Perth from the Sunday Football League and he has the ball on a string in the Falcons' first win for 1989.

=== Round 4 ===
| | Round 4 |
| Saturday, 29 April | West Perth 18.15 (123) | def. | Subiaco 10.13 (73) | Wanneroo (crowd: 5007) |
| Saturday, 29 April | South Fremantle 19.15 (129) | def. | Perth 12.12 (84) | Fremantle Oval (crowd: 5257) |
| Saturday, 29 April | East Perth 5.17 (47) | def. by | Claremont 19.26 (140) | WACA (crowd: 3050) |
| Saturday, 29 April | Swan Districts 17.12 (114) | def. | East Fremantle 13.14 (92) | Bassendean Oval (crowd: 5100) |
Brad Shine steels himself in the back pocket for the second half and becomes the driving force for an unexpected win after Swans were behind until three-quarter time. Eight kicks and six marks hold off most East Fremantle thrusts after half-time.; In an effort to assess a potential move by the Falcons to the northern suburbs, a game is played in the rapidly developing Shire of Wanneroo. West Perth would move to Arena Joondalup for the 1994 season.

=== Round 5 ===
| | Round 5 |
| Saturday, 6 May | Swan Districts 18.17 (125) | def. | Subiaco 16.13 (109) | Bassendean Oval (crowd: 5695) |
| Saturday, 6 May | Perth 22.17 (149) | def. | East Perth 11.8 (74) | Lathlain Park (crowd: 3466) |
| Saturday, 6 May | Claremont 17.18 (120) | def. | South Fremantle 15.10 (100) | Albany (crowd: 4638) |
| Saturday, 6 May | East Fremantle 19.14 (128) | def. | West Perth 14.19 (103) | East Fremantle Oval (crowd: 4671) |
In a fine match watched by a figure claimed to be as high as six thousand, (Note: At the Albany match the attendance figure did not include children under fifteen years of age who were admitted free of charge.) Claremont overcome an 8.5 (53) first quarter with four goals to Craig Edwards as Neesham's brain and skill – compensating for his lack of size and speed – controls a torrid game thereafter.

=== Round 6 ===
| | Round 6 |
| Saturday, 13 May | West Perth 15.24 (114) | def. by | Swan Districts 17.13 (115) | Leederville Oval (crowd: 4403) |
| Saturday, 13 May | South Fremantle 18.18 (126) | def. | East Perth 11.12 (78) | Fremantle Oval (crowd: 3510) |
| Saturday, 13 May | Claremont 18.25 (133) | def. | Perth 18.10 (118) | Claremont Oval (crowd: 3309) |
| Saturday, 13 May | Subiaco 18.14 (122) | def. | East Fremantle 16.14 (110) | Subiaco Oval (crowd: 3780) |
Greg Walker's skill has some observers thinking his champion father (Note: At that time, Bill was president of the Swan Districts Football Club, a position he held from 1983 to 1994.) is making a comeback, as his speed along with Passeri, Bazzo and the Holmes brothers lift Swan Districts to a thrilling win.; Despite a Demon burst of 10.4 (64) to 0.4 (4) either side of half-time, Perth's poor defence that takes only seven marks all game means it cannot hold the Tigers for the remainder of the afternoon.

=== Round 7 ===
| | Round 7 |
| Saturday, 20 May | Swan Districts 12.15 (87) | def. by | South Fremantle 17.10 (112) | Bassendean Oval (crowd: 6352) |
| Saturday, 20 May | Perth 9.20 (74) | def. by | West Perth 15.20 (110) | Lathlain Park (crowd: 3158) |
| Saturday, 20 May | East Perth 12.12 (84) | def. | Subiaco 11.13 (79) | WACA (crowd: 2504) |
| Saturday, 20 May | East Fremantle 4.11 (35) | def. by | Claremont 10.18 (78) | East Fremantle Oval (crowd: 4168) |
In appalling conditions, Claremont's remarkably pin-point precision football in Brian Peake's three hundred and fiftieth senior Australian Rules match gives a convincing win. Peake is his side's best in an unfamiliar role tagging fellow veteran Neesham.; Robert Wiley, having high expectation at season's opening, is very angry at Perth's lack of teamwork in the second half, when West Perth, led by the previously out-of-form Mifka, Madaffari and O‘Brien, score 9.11 (65) to 3.10 (28).

=== Round 8 ===
| | Round 8 |
| Saturday, 27 May | South Fremantle 6.11 (47) | def. by | West Perth 12.15 (87) | Fremantle Oval (crowd: 3682) |
| Saturday, 27 May | Perth 11.13 (79) | def. by | Swan Districts 24.10 (154) | Lathlain Park (crowd: 2616) |
| Saturday, 27 May | Claremont 9.7 (61) | def. by | Subiaco 12.19 (91) | Claremont Oval (crowd: 3015) |
| Saturday, 27 May | East Perth 8.13 (61) | def. by | East Fremantle 14.29 (113) | WACA (crowd: 2122) |
Relegated Eagle forward Karl Langdon shows his toughness by being used as a tagger on Neesham and eliminating his influence to defeat the previously unblemished Tigers – who score only 1.3 (9) in the second half – only a week after the Lions lost to last-placed East Perth.; West Perth win at Fremantle Oval for the first time since 1978, ending the longest run of failures there since East Fremantle left the ground after the 1952 season.

=== Round 9 (Foundation Day) ===
| | Round 9 |
| Saturday, 3 June | Subiaco 13.14 (92) | def. by | Perth 14.12 (96) | Subiaco Oval (crowd: 3561) |
| Saturday, 3 June | West Perth 12.19 (91) | def. by | Claremont 27.9 (171) | Leederville Oval (crowd: 5428) |
| Sunday, 4 June | Swan Districts 12.13 (85) | def. by | East Perth 15.15 (105) | Dampier Sports Ground (crowd: 3000) |
| Monday, 5 June | East Fremantle 21.14 (140) | def. | South Fremantle 20.15 (135) | East Fremantle Oval (crowd: 10000) |
In perfect weather for football fans are treated to a brilliant display, especially by Claremont whose superb disposal and marking make a good West Perth team appear second-rate.; In a second brilliant match for the round, Neil Lester-Smith kicks six goals coming off the bench and Clinton Browning kicked the Sharks' winning goal in the last minute. The match was compared favourably with the previous week's VFL thriller between West Coast and top team Hawthorn.

=== Round 10 ===
| | Round 10 |
| Saturday, 10 June | South Fremantle 16.15 (111) | def. | Subiaco 7.9 (51) | Fremantle Oval (crowd: 4278) |
| Saturday, 10 June | East Perth 15.16 (106) | def. | West Perth 14.16 (100) | WACA (crowd: 3403) |
| Saturday, 10 June | Swan Districts 13.18 (96) | def. by | Claremont 22.12 (144) | Bassendean Oval (crowd: 5126) |
| Saturday, 10 June | Perth 13.10 (88) | def. by | East Fremantle 17.13 (115) | Lathlain Park (crowd: 3178) |

=== Round 11 ===
| | Round 11 |
| Saturday, 17 June | Subiaco 8.16 (64) | def. by | West Perth 14.21 (105) | Subiaco Oval (crowd: 3839) |
| Saturday, 17 June | Perth 11.10 (76) | def. by | South Fremantle 18.18 (126) | Lathlain Park (crowd: 3306) |
| Saturday, 17 June | Claremont 21.11 (137) | def. | East Perth 17.13 (115) | Claremont Oval (crowd: 3306) |
| Saturday, 17 June | East Fremantle 20.16 (136) | def. | Swan Districts 16.10 (106) | East Fremantle Oval (crowd: 4276) |
Despite losing skipper Menaglio, Mifka, relegated Eagle Turley, plus full-forward Gavin Howlett kicking 3.9 (27) from mainly easy shots, West Perth via direct, efficient play appear a chance for the four despite their loss to the Royals the week previously.

=== Round 12 ===
| | Round 12 |
| Saturday, 24 June | Swan Districts 14.17 (101) | def. | Subiaco 14.11 (95) | Bassendean Oval (crowd: 3442) |
| Saturday, 24 June | East Perth 17.16 (118) | def. by | Perth 19.8 (122) | WACA (crowd: 3116) |
| Saturday, 24 June | South Fremantle 16.13 (109) | def. | Claremont 11.14 (80) | Fremantle Oval (crowd: 7668) |
| Saturday, 24 June | West Perth 15.13 (103) | def. by | East Fremantle 23.13 (151) | Leederville Oval (crowd: 3890) |
A noisy members' stand inspires South Fremantle to a fine victory over pacesetters Claremont, as Craig Edwards, already favorite for the Sandover, is a colossus with eighteen kicks and 27 ruck knocks.

=== Round 13 ===
| | Round 13 |
| Saturday, 1 July | Swan Districts 18.12 (120) | def. | West Perth 15.11 (101) | Bassendean Oval (crowd: 4399) |
| Saturday, 1 July | East Perth 11.11 (77) | def. by | South Fremantle 19.16 (130) | WACA (crowd: 3398) |
| Saturday, 1 July | Perth 12.8 (80) | def. by | Claremont 16.13 (109) | Lathlain Park (crowd: 2633) |
| Saturday, 1 July | East Fremantle 15.12 (102) | def. | Subiaco 14.14 (98) | East Fremantle Oval (crowd: 3533) |
After shaving his head to convince selectors to give him more games, Swan Districts rover Peter Hodyl looks a new player as he and his fellow rovers dominate the packs during a vital third quarter when Swans score 6.2 (38) to 3.5 (23). The win leaves Swans three games clear in the four and has WAFL official worried about potentially declining attendances.

=== Round 14 ===
| | Round 14 |
| Saturday, 8 July | South Fremantle 14.10 (94) | def. | Swan Districts 14.7 (91) | Fremantle Oval (crowd: 4683) |
| Saturday, 8 July | West Perth 17.18 (120) | def. | Perth 16.11 (107) | Leederville Oval (crowd: 2636) |
| Saturday, 8 July | Subiaco 22.17 (149) | def. | East Perth 13.6 (84) | Subiaco Oval (crowd: 2741) |
| Saturday, 8 July | Claremont 16.13 (109) | def. | East Fremantle 11.17 (83) | Claremont Oval (crowd: 4200) |
Willie Rioli kicks a 55-metre goal after a fifty-metre penalty on the siren to win the match, whilst the move of his elder brother Maurice's move to the half-forward line proved decisive in energising a previously decrepit Bulldog attack.; Again-relegated Eagle Langdon provokes Dawson of East Perth into a fifty-metre penalty and with three third-quarter goals leads the Lions to win a battle of the tailenders following a slow start.

=== Round 15 ===
| | Round 15 |
| Saturday, 15 July | West Perth 11.14 (80) | def. by | South Fremantle 13.16 (94) | Leederville Oval (crowd: 3748) |
| Saturday, 15 July | Perth 22.6 (138) | def. | Swan Districts 9.9 (63) | Lathlain Park (crowd: 3194) |
| Saturday, 15 July | Subiaco 15.12 (102) | def. | Claremont 11.16 (82) | Subiaco Oval (crowd: 3478) |
| Saturday, 15 July | East Fremantle 20.19 (139) | def. | East Perth 12.12 (84) | East Fremantle Oval (crowd: 2641) |
The on-ball combination of Mark Watson and Willie Dick suggests the four may not be sealed as the pair demolish Swan Districts and atone for several previous costly Demon lapses.

=== Round 16 ===
| | Round 16 |
| Saturday, 22 July | Swan Districts 21.13 (139) | def. | East Perth 12.14 (86) | Bassendean Oval (crowd: 3031) |
| Saturday, 22 July | Perth 18.19 (127) | def. | Subiaco 14.16 (100) | Lathlain Park (crowd: 2684) |
| Saturday, 22 July | Claremont 18.15 (123) | def. | West Perth 3.12 (30) | Claremont Oval (crowd: 2405) |
| Saturday, 22 July | South Fremantle 14.15 (99) | def. by | East Fremantle 20.6 (126) | Fremantle Oval (crowd: 8970) |
West Perth are the first WA(N)FL team goalless at half-time since Swan Districts against South Fremantle in Round 15 of 1976. Their only three goals came during the first few minutes of the third quarter, and it is West Perth's lowest score since 1950 and only the second time since 1928 they have scored just three goals in a match.

=== Round 17 ===
| | Round 17 |
| Saturday, 29 July | Subiaco 12.9 (81) | def. by | South Fremantle 13.14 (92) | Subiaco Oval (crowd: 3465) |
| Saturday, 29 July | East Perth 8.14 (62) | def. by | West Perth 16.10 (106) | WACA (crowd: 2377) |
| Saturday, 29 July | Claremont 13.12 (90) | def. | Swan Districts 9.15 (69) | Claremont Oval (crowd: 3303) |
| Saturday, 29 July | East Fremantle 27.15 (177) | def. | Perth 3.11 (29) | East Fremantle Oval (crowd: 3458) |
In a hard, physical game from when Tony Evans and Mick Grasso tangle at the opening, Claremont's greater accuracy in the second half ensures it a critical victory over the tenacious Swans to stay on top.; East Fremantle record their biggest win over Perth, who kick the fourth-lowest score ever at East Fremantle Oval and the lowest since 1964. The Demons, without Watson, are never in the hunt after scoring the first goal within a minute of the start.

=== Round 18 ===
| | Round 18 |
| Saturday, 5 August | West Perth 18.11 (119) | def. | Subiaco 13.10 (88) | Leederville Oval (crowd: 2812) |
| Saturday, 5 August | South Fremantle 20.8 (128) | def. | Perth 13.5 (83) | Fremantle Oval (crowd: 3282) |
| Saturday, 5 August | East Perth 17.14 (116) | def. by | Claremont 20.17 (137) | WACA (crowd: 2165) |
| Saturday, 5 August | Swan Districts 12.10 (82) | def. by | East Fremantle 14.21 (105) | Bassendean Oval (crowd: 5441) |
Despite playing some of their best football during 1989, Swan Districts move into a precarious position via a loss to a powerful, systematic East Fremantle team – led brilliantly by Brian Peake in the centre.

=== Round 19 ===
| | Round 19 |
| Saturday, 12 August | Subiaco 15.10 (100) | def. by | Swan Districts 23.26 (164) | Subiaco Oval (crowd: 3017) |
| Saturday, 12 August | Perth 16.20 (116) | def. | East Perth 12.14 (86) | Lathlain Park (crowd: 2225) |
| Saturday, 12 August | Claremont 16.8 (104) | def. | South Fremantle 12.11 (83) | Claremont Oval (crowd: 5514) |
| Saturday, 12 August | East Fremantle 16.19 (115) | def. by | West Perth 20.10 (130) | East Fremantle Oval (crowd: 3780) |
A brilliant burst to get within eleven points after West Perth had previously kicked fourteen of fifteen for a fifty-point lead fails to give the Sharks the win needed for a second semi-final berth – Falcon Williams kicks a brilliant goal to seal East Fremantle's fate.; Claremont kick the final seven goals of a match its coach said was "equal in pressure to a VFL game" after South had jumped them with six goals to one in the first quarter, but the Tigers are worried about a hamstring injury to coach Neesham and a should problem to wingman Mark Hann.; Despite having to use an obviously injured Brad Shine to replace Kevin Caton after a collision with Subiaco's Brad McDougall, Swan Districts – with Shine helping exceptionally well – kick 15.16 (106) to 9.2 (56) after a tight first half to be a game and 6.5 percent clear inside the four.; Perth ensure East Perth cannot repeat its late escapes from the wooden spoon in 1986, 1987 and 1988 with a convincing with after an even three quarter led again by defender-cum-centreman Willie Dick.

=== Round 20 ===
| | Round 20 |
| Saturday, 19 August | West Perth 16.17 (113) | def. | Swan Districts 12.16 (88) | Leederville Oval (crowd: 7895) |
| Saturday, 19 August | South Fremantle 21.14 (140) | def. | East Perth 7.4 (46) | Fremantle Oval (crowd: 3149) |
| Saturday, 19 August | Claremont 15.17 (107) | def. | Perth 7.15 (57) | Claremont Oval (crowd: 2660) |
| Saturday, 19 August | Subiaco 10.18 (78) | def. by | East Fremantle 21.10 (136) | Subiaco Oval (crowd: 2800) |
Despite being the victim of a severe bump that was expected to keep him off the field, ex-St. Kilda wingman Jon Riggs recovers to lead West Perth to a critical win that leaves them 3.83 percent behind Swan Districts in fourth – and with a much easier last-round match.

=== Round 21 ===
| | Round 21 |
| Saturday, 26 August | Swan Districts 11.15 (81) | def. by | South Fremantle 17.14 (116) | Bassendean Oval (crowd: 5739) |
| Saturday, 26 August | West Perth 27.15 (177) | def. | Perth 10.15 (75) | Leederville Oval (crowd: 4995) |
| Saturday, 26 August | East Perth 12.17 (89) | def. by | Subiaco 20.17 (137) | WACA (crowd: 1876) |
| Saturday, 26 August | East Fremantle 13.17 (95) | def. | Claremont 12.15 (87) | East Fremantle Oval (crowd: 6060) |
Swan Districts fall out of the four for the only time all season as West Perth thrash Perth, whilst the Swans cannot counter raging Sandover favourite Edwards' 23 kicks, 13 marks and five goals or Maurice Rioli's 31 kicks and eleven handballs.; Despite not kicking a goal between the eight-minute mark of the second quarter and the corresponding point of the last, East Fremantle expose numerous flaws in Claremont's ruck and forward divisions to make a second flag look doubtful.

== Ladder ==
1989 WAFL ladder
| Pos | Team | Pld | W | L | D | PF | PA | PP | Pts |
|---|---|---|---|---|---|---|---|---|---|
| 1 | Claremont (P) | 21 | 17 | 4 | 0 | 2376 | 1724 | 137.8 | 68 |
| 2 | South Fremantle | 21 | 16 | 5 | 0 | 2336 | 1870 | 124.9 | 64 |
| 3 | East Fremantle | 21 | 15 | 6 | 0 | 2539 | 1982 | 128.1 | 60 |
| 4 | West Perth | 21 | 11 | 10 | 0 | 2196 | 2146 | 102.3 | 44 |
| 5 | Swan Districts | 21 | 10 | 11 | 0 | 2236 | 2243 | 99.7 | 40 |
| 6 | Subiaco | 21 | 6 | 15 | 0 | 1971 | 2209 | 89.2 | 24 |
| 7 | Perth | 21 | 6 | 15 | 0 | 1968 | 2560 | 76.9 | 24 |
| 8 | East Perth | 21 | 3 | 18 | 0 | 1752 | 2640 | 66.4 | 12 |

Source: "1989 Ladder". WAFL Footy Facts.
Rules for classification: 1) points; 2) percentage; 3) number of points for.
(P) Premiers

== Finals ==
=== Semi-finals ===
| | First semi-final |
| Saturday, 2 September | East Fremantle 16.14 (110) | drew with | West Perth 16.14 (110) | Subiaco Oval (crowd: 15,656) |
In his three hundredth WA(N)FL game, Brian Peake goaled from 40 metres out to produce the first senior WA(N)FL finals draw since the 1938 Grand Final. As of 2025, it remains East Fremantle's only draw since 1974.

| | First semi-final replay |
| Saturday, 9 September (11:45 am) | East Fremantle 17.17 (119) | def. | West Perth 9.22 (76) | Subiaco Oval (crowd: 30,246) |
The replay was played as a double-header with the second semi-final, starting a tradition established in the WAFL during the 1990s.; West Perth's woeful inaccuracy costs it dearly in the end after the two teams were deadlocked following six quarters of football. In the second half the Sharks' rucks and rovers took over completely.

| | Second semi-final |
| Saturday, 9 September (2:15 pm) | Claremont 12.17 (89) | def. by | South Fremantle 16.9 (105) | Subiaco Oval (crowd: 30,246) |
With the motivation of winning for former champion coach Clive Lewington who was dying of cancer, South Fremantle get away in the final ten minutes with three remarkable goals from Peter Matera

=== Preliminary final ===
| | Preliminary final |
| Saturday, 16 September | Claremont 17.14 (116) | def. | East Fremantle 12.13 (85) | Subiaco Oval (crowd: 16,088) |
Despite ridiculously taking to a criss-cross short-passing style after kicking the first nine goals, 31-possession Neesham and Rowland hold off East Fremantle after the Sharks kick five straight at the beginning of the final quarter to be only twelve points behind.

=== Grand Final ===
1989 WAFL Grand Final
Saturday, 23 September | South Fremantle | def. by | Claremont | Subiaco Oval (crowd: 38,193)
0.2 (2); 1.6 (12); 5.7 (37); 5.9 (39) | Q1; Q2; Q3; Final | 4.6 (30); 9.10 (64); 11.13 (79); 15.16 (106) | Umpires: David Johnson, Mike Ball; Simpson Medal: Ben Allan (Claremont)
Willie Rioli 2, Peter Matera, Geary, Macdonald | Goals | Brayshaw 5, Dale Kickett 3, Evans 3, Thorne 2, Mann, Allan
Edwards, Solin, Maskos, Nalder, Brad Collard | Best | Allan, Evans, Thorne, Neeshan, Scott, Hahn, Brayshaw
In a game expected to be close, Claremont record a crushing win via a superb defence and brilliant tagging. South Fremantle kick the lowest open-age WA(N)FL Grand Final score since 1934, with all their goals coming between the 28-minute mark of the second quarter and midway through the third. Neesham, who was superb in the packs, Peter Thorne and Warren Ralph retired as players after the game.
