= 1991 WAFL season =

Australian rules football season

- Teams: 8
- Premiers: Claremont; 8th premiership
- Minor premiers: Claremont; 10th minor premiership
- Sandover Medallist: Ian Dargie (Subiaco)
- Bernie Naylor Medallist: John Hutton (Claremont)
- Matches played: 90

The 1991 WAFL season was the 107th season of the various incarnations of the West Australian Football League. With the West Coast Eagles still pushing attendances down and club finances into the red, the league made further experiments. Following on from the VFL and SANFL it introduced a "final five" to replace the final four in use since 1905, but this did not produce the hoped-for financial benefits and was abandoned after four seasons. A more enduring result of this chance was a "double-header" system of playing finals, whereby the two senior semi-finals were played at Subiaco Oval on the same day, with the first game starting just before noon and the second at the traditional time for playing finals. As a consequence of the double-headers, reserves finals were played at Fremantle Oval and colts at Bassendean.

The league also reverted to the "WAFL" moniker after the change to "WA State League" or "WASFL" was regarded as a failure. At the end of the home-and-away season, the WAFL saw offers from Kalgoorlie City, the South West National Football League and Geraldton to join as expansion clubs in an effort to gain more revenue from television. These proposals never materialised, but the first expansion since 1934 was to occur six seasons later with Peel Thunder.

On the field, Claremont won its fifth consecutive minor premiership in more decisive fashion than any of the previous four, losing only one match after the opening round and achieving the third-longest winning streak in open-age football, though their unbeaten sequence did not equal the 22 games achieved in 1987/1988. The Tiger dynasty would be broken the following season as the drafting of ten key players by AFL clubs decimated their ranks and they avoided the wooden spoon only by percentage in 1992.

Perth and East Perth, pre-1979 power clubs, both returned to the finals after long absences, in the Royals' case after the bleakest era in their history with only 33 wins in 126 matches and in the Demons' after being doomed pre-season to win only a couple of games after a clean-out and their 1990 Colts having won only once. East Fremantle, who had not missed finals participation since 1982, were decimated by the in-season resignation of coach Ron Wilcox and president Hans Beyer and did not play finals in any grade. The Sharks were also affected by the loss of number one ruckman Lance Durack after an altercation with Beyer – Durack was recruited by Swan Districts but never played for them and returned to the blue and whites in the tenth round. East Fremantle did recover during June and July but a serious lack of depth, well known to coach Judge, drove them off-course in August. South Fremantle had their worst season since the disaster of 1987, losing in spectacular fashion on numerous occasions in July and August, whilst West Perth, who at one point had due to senior-list injuries to give seven of their colts team a second match in a single day with the reserves, took their second consecutive wooden spoon.

On an individual front, Subiaco broke the longest club drought in Sandover Medal history, winning for the first time since Haydn Bunton, Sr. in 1941. The Lions were, however, to suffer the ignominy of losing the Grand Final in all three grades.

== Home-and-away season ==
=== Round 1 ===
| | Round 1 |
| Saturday, 6 April (2:15 pm) | East Fremantle 10.13 (73) | def. by | Perth 22.14 (146) | East Fremantle Oval (crowd: 3074) |
| Saturday, 6 April (2:15 pm) | East Perth 24.26 (170) | def. | South Fremantle 6.9 (45) | Perth Oval (crowd: 6009) |
| Saturday, 6 April (2:15 pm) | Subiaco 21.22 (148) | def. | West Perth 18.10 (118) | Subiaco Oval (crowd: 4443) |
| Saturday, 6 April (2:15 pm) | Swan Districts 14.17 (101) | def. | Claremont 13.14 (92) | Bassendean Oval (crowd: 4799) |
Mick Hastie repeats his Round 7 effort from the previous season with two late goals as the depleted Swans repeat their Grand Final victory.; A depleted West Perth team – minus the returning Bill Duckworth – come back from 0.1 (1) to 7.5 (47) down after twenty minutes to take the lead against a Lion team with eight Eagle-listed players before Haydn Bunton, Jr.'s coaching skill gets the Lions home.

=== Round 2 ===
| | Round 2 |
| Saturday, 13 April (2:15 pm) | Perth 21.9 (135) | def. | Swan Districts 12.18 (90) | Lathlain Park (crowd: 4369) |
| Saturday, 13 April (2:15 pm) | South Fremantle 22.15 (147) | def. | East Fremantle 16.9 (105) | Fremantle Oval (crowd: 5487) |
| Saturday, 13 April (2:15 pm) | Claremont 19.18 (132) | def. | Subiaco 10.10 (70) | Claremont Oval (crowd: 3337) |
| Saturday, 13 April (2:15 pm) | West Perth 13.8 (86) | def. by | East Perth 22.18 (150) | Leederville Oval (crowd: 4496) |
Injury-plagued forward John Hutton kicks five goals in his first senior match after being recruited in 1987 as Claremont rebound from their opening loss to thrash the Lions.

=== Round 3 ===
| | Round 3 |
| Friday, 19 April (6:45 pm) | Claremont 18.21 (129) | def. | West Perth 8.17 (65) | WACA (crowd: 3000) |
| Saturday, 20 April (2:15 pm) | East Perth 12.14 (86) | def. by | Swan Districts 16.11 (107) | Perth Oval (crowd: 7028) |
| Saturday, 20 April (2:15 pm) | East Fremantle 14.15 (99) | def. by | Subiaco 22.23 (155) | East Fremantle Oval (crowd: 3426) |
| Saturday, 20 April (2:15 pm) | Perth 17.15 (117) | def. | South Fremantle 15.19 (109) | Lathlain Park (crowd: 3846) |
East Perth fail their first real test as Swan Districts coach John Todd works out a tactic to punch at all costs everything that went near Royal key forwards Glenn Bartlett and Ken Seymour – and uses it to effect.; The return of John Garvanich and six goals from half-forward flanker Willie Dick – who had been at Goomalling in 1990 – leads Perth to top position for the first time since 1978.; Subiaco and East Fremantle kick 26.17 (173) in the first half, the equal sixth-highest on record, but only 10.22 (82) in the second.

=== Round 4 (Anzac Day) ===
| | Round 4 |
| Thursday, 25 April (2:15 pm) | East Perth 13.23 (101) | def. | Subiaco 10.11 (71) | WACA (crowd: 8380) |
| Thursday, 25 April (5:30 pm) | West Perth 25.19 (169) | def. | East Fremantle 16.14 (110) | WACA (crowd: 8380) |
| Saturday, 27 April (2:15 pm) | Claremont 17.16 (118) | def. | Perth 13.6 (84) | Claremont Oval (crowd: 3256) |
| Saturday, 27 April (2:15 pm) | Swan Districts 13.12 (90) | def. by | South Fremantle 25.14 (164) | Bassendean Oval (crowd: 3571) |
The WAFL holds a double-header on Anzac Day at the WACA, but the experiment, as in the 1986 VFL season, is deemed a failure and not repeated.; West Perth's ruck and centreline power – given by the returning Craig Nelson – demolishes the crisis-stricken Sharks, who are only in the hunt for a few minutes at the start of the final quarter when they kick four goals in five minutes.; Former Swan Districts star John Annear haunts coach Todd as he plays his first WAFL match since 1982 after a calf injury and tags dangerous Swan Troy Ugle out of the match.

=== Round 5 ===
| | Round 5 |
| Friday, 3 May (6:45 pm) | East Perth 10.14 (74) | def. by | East Fremantle 14.10 (94) | WACA (crowd: 2500) |
| Saturday, 4 May (2:15 pm) | Subiaco 7.18 (60) | def. by | Perth 11.14 (80) | Subiaco Oval (crowd: 3622) |
| Saturday, 4 May (2:15 pm) | West Perth 9.14 (68) | def. by | Swan Districts 19.19 (133) | Leederville Oval (crowd: 2000) |
| Saturday, 4 May (2:15 pm) | South Fremantle 5.9 (39) | def. by | Claremont 10.21 (81) | Fremantle Oval (crowd: 3012) |
Perth unexpectedly win their fourth match out of five in wet conditions as returning ruck-rover Merv Kelly consistently scrambles the ball forward on a day when other tactics prove futile.; After John Todd was reputed to have trained Swan Districts under sprinklers during the week, the heavens open and after quarter-time Swan Districts' small men prove far too good.

=== Round 6 ===
| | Round 6 |
| Saturday, 11 May (2:15 pm) | Claremont 14.8 (92) | def. by | East Fremantle 16.9 (105) | Claremont Oval (crowd: 2236) |
| Saturday, 11 May (2:15 pm) | Perth 13.13 (91) | def. by | East Perth 21.10 (136) | Lathlain Park (crowd: 3622) |
| Saturday, 11 May (2:15 pm) | South Fremantle 24.6 (150) | def. | West Perth 12.11 (83) | Fremantle Oval (crowd: 2185) |
| Saturday, 11 May (2:15 pm) | Swan Districts 18.19 (127) | def. | Subiaco 11.11 (77) | Bassendean Oval (crowd: 2571) |
Despite East Fremantle beating the four-time minor premiers, new coach Ken Judge is very cautious about the Sharks' prospects for 1991 after a horror start on- and off-field.; Future West Coast champion defender Glen Jakovich (with eight goals two behinds) and former Eagle Stevan Jackson dominate up forward for the Bulldogs, who record a crushing win after trailing by sixteen points entering time-on in the second quarter.

=== Round 7 ===
| | Round 7 |
| Saturday, 18 May (2:15 pm) | East Perth 12.4 (76) | def. by | Claremont 11.18 (84) | Perth Oval (crowd: 3339) |
| Saturday, 18 May (2:15 pm) | Subiaco 17.15 (117) | def. | South Fremantle 14.14 (98) | Subiaco Oval (crowd: 2500) |
| Saturday, 18 May (2:15 pm) | West Perth 19.15 (129) | def. | Perth 17.10 (112) | Leederville Oval (crowd: 2420) |
| Saturday, 18 May (2:15 pm) | East Fremantle 11.10 (76) | def. by | Swan Districts 21.15 (141) | East Fremantle Oval (crowd: 4161) |
Young centreman Andrew McGovern comes into the limelight with a brilliant 40-possession display that results in the Tigers taking top spot from the upstart Royals despite their inaccurate kicking (John Hutton scored three goals eight behinds).; In Wayne "Terror" Dayman's one hundredth match, West Perth record a surprise victory with seventeen fit players despite disciplining several mainstays and uncertainty over the future of coach George Michalczyk.

=== Round 8 ===
| | Round 8 |
| Saturday, 25 May (2:15 pm) | South Fremantle 10.11 (71) | def. by | East Perth 10.13 (73) | Fremantle Oval (crowd: 4500) |
| Saturday, 25 May (2:15 pm) | Perth 17.11 (113) | def. | East Fremantle 15.15 (105) | Lathlain Park (crowd: 2736) |
| Saturday, 25 May (2:15 pm) | West Perth 14.16 (100) | def. by | Subiaco 19.9 (123) | Leederville Oval (crowd: 2667) |
| Saturday, 25 May (2:15 pm) | Claremont 22.15 (147) | def. | Swan Districts 10.13 (73) | Claremont Oval (crowd: 3975) |
West Perth coach Michalczyk was reported for abusive language when he called umpire Ray Zoch a "cheat" and ultimately fined $250. Subiaco gained a goal after successive 50-metre penalties from the half-back line and repelled a strong Falcon challenge that before the incident looked as though it would win the match.; East Perth coach Ian McCulloch's conversion of runner Sean King into a tagger shuts down West Coast-listed South Fremantle centreman Scott Watters in a thrilling, defence-oriented game. Glen Jakovich kicks six in this fiftieth game at eighteen but has no support.

=== Round 9 (Foundation Day) ===
| | Round 9 |
| Saturday, 1 June (2:15 pm) | East Perth 16.14 (110) | def. by | West Perth 21.7 (133) | Perth Oval (crowd: 2850) |
| Saturday, 1 June (2:15 pm) | Subiaco 12.8 (80) | def. by | Claremont 14.13 (97) | Subiaco Oval (crowd: 2500) |
| Monday, 3 June (2:15 pm) | Swan Districts 16.15 (111) | def. | Perth 6.11 (47) | Bassendean Oval (crowd: 4467) |
| Monday, 3 June (2:15 pm) | East Fremantle 15.10 (100) | def. | South Fremantle 12.7 (79) | East Fremantle Oval (crowd: 7102) |
Jason Norrish proves another outstanding youngster for Claremont, whose speed recalls Daniel Panizza when much younger. Subiaco were close early but faded in the third quarter.; In Bill Duckworth's first match since returning from Essendon, West Perth come back from an early deficit to upset the Royals – undone by a weak defence.; Veteran Phil Narkle and rookie Brendan Retzlaff – consistently interchanged on the wings – decimate Perth in the wet and relegate the Demons from second position.

=== Round 10 ===
| | Round 10 |
| Saturday, 8 June (2:15 pm) | Swan Districts 18.17 (125) | def. | East Perth 10.12 (72) | Bassendean Oval (crowd: 4322) |
| Saturday, 8 June (2:15 pm) | South Fremantle 17.13 (115) | def. | Perth 10.15 (75) | Fremantle Oval (crowd: 2881) |
| Saturday, 8 June (2:15 pm) | Subiaco 6.16 (52) | def. by | East Fremantle 17.14 (116) | Subiaco Oval (crowd: 2928) |
| Saturday, 8 June (2:15 pm) | Claremont 28.23 (191) | def. | West Perth 10.12 (72) | Claremont Oval (crowd: 2612) |
East Fremantle sees former State ruckman Durack return to dominate the midfield and crush the Lions for a fourth win since Judge's takeover of the coaching reins.; Geoff Miles – a rare success among numerous WAFL recruits from Victoria – kicks six goals as Claremont crush the Falcons, despite being unavailable for state selection due to an appointment in Victoria.

=== Round 11 ===
| | Round 11 |
| Saturday, 15 June (2:15 pm) | East Perth 15.8 (98) | def. by | Subiaco 19.12 (126) | Perth Oval (crowd: 2027) |
| Saturday, 15 June (2:15 pm) | Perth 10.10 (70) | def. by | Claremont 12.15 (87) | Lathlain Park (crowd: 2186) |
| Saturday, 15 June (2:15 pm) | South Fremantle 14.12 (96) | def. | Swan Districts 14.8 (92) | Fremantle Oval (crowd: 2697) |
| Saturday, 15 June (2:15 pm) | West Perth 14.7 (91) | def. by | East Fremantle 23.15 (153) | Leederville Oval (crowd: 2070) |
After Perth led by 23 points in stormy and very wet weather, Neesham – as Perth coach Armstrong admits – win the match by moving defenders Beresford and Miles into the centre and attack, where they undermine Perth's movement of the ball.; Clinton Browning's six goals in nineteen minutes despite wet conditions ensures East Fremantle win their fifth match in seven since their coaching change – although Judge still says the Sharks have much to do to be a finals force.

=== Round 12 ===
| | Round 12 |
| Saturday, 22 June (2:15 pm) | East Fremantle 21.12 (138) | def. | East Perth 10.9 (69) | East Fremantle Oval (crowd: 2342) |
| Saturday, 22 June (2:15 pm) | Perth 14.10 (94) | def. by | Subiaco 16.17 (113) | Lathlain Park (crowd: 1948) |
| Saturday, 22 June (2:15 pm) | Swan Districts 15.12 (102) | def. by | West Perth 15.18 (108) | Bassendean Oval (crowd: 2510) |
| Saturday, 22 June (2:15 pm) | Claremont 16.21 (117) | def. | South Fremantle 8.4 (52) | Claremont Oval (crowd: 2399) |
East Fremantle jump from seventh to third in one week but coach Judge is dissatisfied with the Sharks' failure to maintain their early standard after leading 17.11 (113) to 1.5 (11) after seventeen minutes of the third quarter.

=== Round 13 ===
| | Round 13 |
| Saturday, 29 June (2:15 pm) | East Fremantle 12.14 (86) | def. by | Claremont 14.9 (93) | East Fremantle Oval (crowd: 3659) |
| Saturday, 29 June (2:15 pm) | East Perth 17.15 (117) | def. | Perth 14.15 (99) | Perth Oval (crowd: 2129) |
| Saturday, 29 June (2:15 pm) | Subiaco 19.12 (126) | def. | Swan Districts 8.14 (62) | Bassendean Oval (crowd: 2924) |
| Saturday, 29 June (2:15 pm) | West Perth 14.6 (90) | def. by | South Fremantle 16.14 (110) | Leederville Oval (crowd: 2311) |
Owing to the poor condition of Subiaco Oval after Perth's wettest year since 1973, the Lions' match with Swan Districts was transferred to Bassendean and the clubs' third match transferred to Subiaco.; Claremont again make a decisive comeback when led early in a match, this time from thirty-four points behind at half-time before kicking 12.3 (75) to 5.4 (34) for a seventh consecutive victory.; Perth lose for the eighth occasion in ten matches, whilst a relatively much weaker East Perth end a four-match losing sequence in a game where numerous Demon goals in "junk time" flatter the losers.

=== Round 14 ===
| | Round 14 |
| Saturday, 6 July (2:15 pm) | Claremont 17.20 (122) | def. | East Perth 13.3 (81) | Claremont Oval (crowd: 2199) |
| Saturday, 6 July (2:15 pm) | Perth 22.18 (150) | def. | West Perth 10.9 (69) | Kelmscott (crowd: 1793) |
| Saturday, 6 July (2:15 pm) | South Fremantle 13.9 (87) | def. by | Subiaco 30.8 (188) | Fremantle Oval (crowd: 2191) |
| Saturday, 6 July (2:15 pm) | Swan Districts 11.15 (81) | def. | East Fremantle 9.9 (63) | Bassendean Oval (crowd: 2592) |
With the WAFL recommending a move to the Perth Hills by the Demons (in spite of strong resistance by the committee), the club plays another game in Kelmscott but it again proves a financial flop and the move is abandoned by 1995.; Subiaco's score is the most accurate in the WAFL is terms of excess of goals over behinds since 1979 and still the equal sixth-most ever, belying previous inaccurate scoring by the team. Former Footscray forward John Georgiades helps crush the Bulldogs with a devastating display from centre half-forward.

=== Round 15 ===
| | Round 15 |
| Saturday, 13 July (2:15 pm) | East Fremantle 18.14 (122) | def. | Perth 12.15 (87) | East Fremantle Oval (crowd: 2199) |
| Saturday, 13 July (2:15 pm) | East Perth 18.11 (119) | def. | South Fremantle 14.13 (97) | Perth Oval (crowd: 2581) |
| Saturday, 13 July (2:15 pm) | Subiaco 28.10 (178) | def. | West Perth 12.7 (79) | Subiaco Oval (crowd: 2973) |
| Saturday, 13 July (2:15 pm) | Swan Districts 13.7 (85) | def. by | Claremont 18.15 (123) | Bassendean Oval (crowd: 4164) |
Clinton Browning, after two weeks absent with injury, kicks three early goals and combines with fellow veteran Shane Ellis to win a crucial match in the emerging battle for fourth and fifth between East Fremantle, Perth and East Perth.; Subiaco's 20.6 (126) is their highest score in the first half of a match, and the highest by any club since 1984, but their second half has coach Bunton lamenting that they play too much as individuals.

=== Round 16 ===
| | Round 16 |
| Saturday, 20 July (2:15 pm) | Perth 13.10 (88) | def. by | Swan Districts 16.17 (113) | Lathlain Park (crowd: 2537) |
| Saturday, 20 July (2:15 pm) | South Fremantle 6.11 (47) | def. by | East Fremantle 26.19 (175) | Fremantle Oval (crowd: 6241) |
| Saturday, 20 July (2:15 pm) | Claremont 19.15 (129) | def. | Subiaco 9.12 (66) | Claremont Oval (crowd: 3449) |
| Saturday, 20 July (2:15 pm) | East Perth 16.15 (111) | def. | West Perth 6.12 (48) | Wanneroo (crowd: 2976) |
In order to assess a move to the growing northwestern corridor mooted since the late 1960s, West Perth play a second match there following from their 1989 game with Subiaco. The Falcons moved to Arena Joondalup in 1994.; With Panizza crushing the in-form Georgiades, Claremont hold out Subiaco into the wind in the opening quarter and then score eleven goals with it in the second to what was billed as the WAFL's "game of the season" and move four games clear on top – effectively sealing the minor premiership.; East Fremantle kick twenty-one goals to three after quarter-time against a woeful South to move two games clear inside the five – and facing Subiaco in a battle for third position.

=== Round 17 ===
| | Round 17 |
| Saturday, 27 July (2:15 pm) | East Perth 19.17 (131) | def. | Swan Districts 19.15 (129) | Perth Oval (crowd: 4184) |
| Saturday, 27 July (2:15 pm) | East Fremantle 16.13 (109) | def. by | Subiaco 16.14 (110) | East Fremantle Oval (crowd: 3050) |
| Saturday, 27 July (2:15 pm) | Perth 18.18 (126) | def. | South Fremantle 10.13 (73) | Lathlain Park (crowd: 2233) |
| Saturday, 27 July (2:15 pm) | West Perth 6.10 (46) | def. by | Claremont 25.17 (167) | Leederville Oval (crowd: 2187) |
A quick move from the centre allows Subiaco to win a high-paced thriller after Browning gave East Fremantle the lead thirty minutes into the final quarter. Future 210 centimetres (6 ft 11 in) Docker star "Spider" Burton is best-on-ground.; In a match televised throughout Western Australia, East Perth and Swan Districts produce both breathtaking individual skills and a thrilling finish. Kevin Caton takes two of the marks-of-the-year in thirty seconds during the opening quarter, but these and his eight goals just fail to give Swans victory.

=== Round 18 ===
| | Round 18 |
| Saturday, 3 August (2:15 pm) | Subiaco 17.10 (112) | def. | East Perth 8.16 (64) | Subiaco Oval (crowd: 2905) |
| Saturday, 3 August (2:15 pm) | Claremont 18.14 (122) | def. | Perth 4.9 (33) | Claremont Oval (crowd: 1723) |
| Saturday, 3 August (2:15 pm) | East Fremantle 17.12 (114) | def. | West Perth 10.9 (69) | East Fremantle Oval (crowd: 1747) |
| Saturday, 3 August (2:15 pm) | Swan Districts 17.9 (111) | def. | South Fremantle 9.11 (65) | Bassendean Oval (crowd: 2000) |
Claremont, with their defence "irresistible", lead 10.2 (62) to 0.2 (2) and eighteen goals to two late in the third quarter as Perth appear disinterested.

=== Round 19 ===
| | Round 19 |
| Saturday, 10 August (2:15 pm) | East Perth 17.9 (111) | def. | East Fremantle 12.13 (85) | Perth Oval (crowd: 2544) |
| Saturday, 10 August (2:15 pm) | Subiaco 11.12 (78) | def. by | Perth 15.10 (100) | Subiaco Oval (crowd: 3435) |
| Saturday, 10 August (2:15 pm) | West Perth 7.13 (55) | def. by | Swan Districts 14.15 (99) | Leederville Oval (crowd: 2123) |
| Saturday, 10 August (2:15 pm) | South Fremantle 14.8 (92) | def. by | Claremont 30.14 (194) | Fremantle Oval (crowd: 2207) |
John Hutton's thirteen goals is the most by a Claremont player against South Fremantle, whilst the Tigers' score was their second-highest against the Bulldogs exceeded only in the opening game of 1986.; After six second-quarter gals by Stevan Jackson, Claremont score 19.6 (120) to 2.5 (17) in the second half as Kevin Mitchell obtained 33 possessions and uses all superbly to give the forwards numerous chances.; In Willie Dick's one hundredth game, the elusive forward's goalkicking skill and a return to form from the speedy runners has Perth winning only its fifth match in sixteen to maintain a chance of reaching the finals.

=== Round 20 ===
| | Round 20 |
| Saturday, 17 August (2:15 pm) | Claremont 17.30 (132) | def. | East Fremantle 13.8 (86) | Claremont Oval (crowd: 2928) |
| Saturday, 17 August (2:15 pm) | Perth 19.12 (126) | def. | East Perth 7.6 (48) | Lathlain Park (crowd: 3951) |
| Saturday, 17 August (2:15 pm) | South Fremantle 14.15 (99) | def. by | West Perth 16.13 (109) | Fremantle Oval (crowd: 1826) |
| Saturday, 17 August (2:15 pm) | Subiaco 17.14 (116) | def. | Swan Districts 8.18 (66) | Subiaco Oval (crowd: 3000) |
A ferocious Perth, tackling fiercely and pouncing upon each loose ball, crushes a "soft" Royal team. Willie Dick scores one brilliant goal after intercepting a handball from George Giannakis and weaving through the defence.; An eight-goal-to-two final quarter – with Billy Krakouer kicking three in three minutes – allows East Fremantle to stay fifth despite Claremont recording another crushing victory – assured by a 17-scoring-shots-to-one opening quarter.; In former Richmond mainstay David Palm's final match, a depleted West Perth team manages to win at Fremantle for only the second time in thirteen seasons due to a brilliant third quarter with the wind.

=== Round 21 ===
| | Round 21 |
| Saturday, 24 August (2:15 pm) | East Perth 12.11 (83) | def. by | Claremont 19.15 (129) | Perth Oval (crowd: 3606) |
| Saturday, 24 August (2:15 pm) | East Fremantle 13.10 (88) | def. by | Swan Districts 18.16 (124) | East Fremantle Oval (crowd: 3850) |
| Saturday, 24 August (2:15 pm) | Subiaco 25.11 (161) | def. | South Fremantle 7.14 (56) | Subiaco Oval (crowd: 2214) |
| Saturday, 24 August (2:15 pm) | West Perth 11.16 (82) | def. by | Perth 16.20 (116) | Leederville Oval (crowd: 3007) |
East Perth stay in the five via Swan Districts' win despite Dale Kickett taking control after the blue and blacks put in a gallant first half against the seemingly invincible leaders.; In veteran Falcon "Terror" Dayman's farewell match (he was carried off the ground), Perth on-ballers Barich (in his 100th game) and Lally (40 possessions) ensure the Demons jump from sixth to fourth.

== Ladder ==
1991 WAFL ladder
| Pos | Team | Pld | W | L | D | PF | PA | PP | Pts |
|---|---|---|---|---|---|---|---|---|---|
| 1 | Claremont (P) | 21 | 19 | 2 | 0 | 2578 | 1578 | 163.4 | 76 |
| 2 | Subiaco | 21 | 13 | 8 | 0 | 2327 | 2012 | 115.7 | 52 |
| 3 | Swan Districts | 21 | 12 | 9 | 0 | 2162 | 2023 | 106.9 | 48 |
| 4 | Perth | 21 | 10 | 11 | 0 | 2089 | 2070 | 100.9 | 40 |
| 5 | East Perth | 21 | 10 | 11 | 0 | 2080 | 2118 | 98.2 | 40 |
| 6 | East Fremantle | 21 | 9 | 12 | 0 | 2202 | 2182 | 100.9 | 36 |
| 7 | South Fremantle | 21 | 6 | 15 | 0 | 1924 | 2493 | 77.2 | 24 |
| 8 | West Perth | 21 | 5 | 16 | 0 | 1869 | 2755 | 67.8 | 20 |

Rules for classification: 1) points; 2) percentage; 3) number of points for.
(P) Premiers

== Finals ==
=== Elimination and Qualifying Finals ===
| | Elimination Final |
| Sunday, 1 September (11:40 am) | Perth 12.14 (86) | def. | East Perth 11.13 (79) | Subiaco Oval (crowd: 14,693) |

| | Qualifying Final |
| Sunday, 1 September (2:45 pm) | Subiaco 19.12 (126) | def. | Swan Districts 12.11 (83) | Subiaco Oval (crowd: 14,693) |
Since the two finals were played at the same venue on the same day, the attendance figure is the same.; After Swan Districts defender Steven Handley becomes the first WAFL player sent off (for charging Andrew Macnish), Subiaco run riot to kick 9.0 (54) in the final quarter, as Bill Monaghan decimates Kevin Caton and "Spider" Burton again dominates the ruck.

=== Semi-finals ===
| | First semi-final |
| Saturday, 7 September (11:40 am) | Swan Districts 23.13 (151) | def. | Perth 9.9 (63) | Subiaco Oval (crowd: 10,637) |

| | Second semi-final |
| Saturday, 7 September (2:45 pm) | Claremont 19.20 (134) | def. | Subiaco 10.6 (66) | Subiaco Oval (crowd: 10,637) |
Since the two semi-finals were played at the same venue on the same day, the attendance figure is the same.; A nervous start precedes Claremont further shorten their overwhelming premiership favouritism as future AFL recruits Jeremy Guard, Tony Evans and Andrew McGovern run over the Lions.

=== Preliminary final ===
| | Preliminary final |
| Saturday, 14 September (2:45 pm) | Subiaco 22.14 (146) | def. | Swan Districts 17.12 (114) | Subiaco Oval (crowd: 7,702) |
In front of a poor crowd Swans redeem two poor displays against the Lions, as the lead changes five times during the last quarter before Subiaco kick 5.0 (30) to one behind in the final fifteen minutes. The return to full forward of Todd Breman – who had played in defence for most of 1991 – pays dividends as he kicks ten goals, breaking the record of nine goals in a preliminary final by Con Regan in 1962.

=== Grand Final ===
1991 WAFL Grand Final
Sunday, 22 September (2:45 pm) | Claremont | def. | Subiaco | Subiaco Oval (crowd: 22,731)
8.2 (50); 13.7 (85); 18.14 (122); 19.18 (132) | Q1; Q2; Q3; Final | 1.1 (7); 2.3 (15); 4.4 (28); 8.7 (55) | Umpires: Grant Vernon, Trevor Garrett; Simpson Medal: Dale Kickett (Claremont)
Hutton 5, Guard 3, Dale Kickett 3, Mitchell 2, Evans 2, Hepburn, Malone, Norrish, Hann | Goals | Kemp 3, Maguire 2, Macnish, Breman, Georgiades
Mitchell, Malone, Hann, Kickett, Edwards, Panizza | Best | Cocker, Williams, Macnish, Golding, Moneghan, Snow
Reports | Snow by field umpire Garrett for striking Hutton in third quarter
Claremont's score is the highest half-time score in a WAFL Grand Final, and they looked like beating West Perth's 1975 record margin until late in the game.
