= Craig Edwards (Australian footballer) =

Australian rules footballer

Personal information
- Full name: Craig Wayne Edwards
- Born: 25 April 1961 (age 65); Mount Lawley, Western Australia
- Original team: East Perth–Highgate
- Position: Ruckman

Playing career^{1}
Years	Club	Games (Goals)
1979–1983	East Perth	73 (109)
1984–1992	South Fremantle	163 (250)

Representative team honours
Years	Team	Games (Goals)
1982–1991	Western Australia	7 (4)
- ^{1} Playing statistics correct to the end of 1992.

Career highlights
- South Fremantle best and fairest 1988, 1989; Sandover Medal 1989; WAFL leading goalkicker: 1992

Craig Wayne Edwards (born 25 April 1961) is a former Australian rules footballer who played for East Perth and South Fremantle in the West Australian Football League (WAFL). Edwards won the 1989 Sandover Medal as the best player in the competition and was named as one of the top 25 WAFL players of the 25 years from 1987 to 2012.

== Career ==
Edwards was born in Mount Lawley, Western Australia and grew up in Bayswater. He attended Hillcrest Primary School and John Forrest Secondary College. He played football for the East Perth-Highgate Junior Football Club. He started playing colts football for East Perth in 1977, making his senior debut in 1979 in an Escort Cup match in Melbourne at VFL Park. He then played three games for East Perth before being dropped back to the reserves, and a further 70 games over the next four seasons. At the end of the 1983 season he was recruited by South Fremantle and went on to play for them for the next nine seasons. He was one of the favourites for the 1988 Sandover Medal, but came second by two votes to David Bain. The following year he polled one less vote, but won the count by three votes from Mark Brayshaw.

He continues to play for another 4 seasons, sharing the WAFL goal-kicking award with Kevin Caton in his last season in 1992, although his total of 48 goals was the lowest to be leading goalkicker since 1923. He played in two losing WAFL grand finals, in 1989 and 1992. He played for Western Australia on seven occasions, kicking 4 goals.
