= Derek Kickett =

Australian rules footballer (born 1962)

Personal information
- Full name: Derek Kickett
- Born: 6 October 1962 (age 64); Kellerberrin, Western Australia
- Original team: West Perth
- Draft: No. 60, 1988 national draft
- Height: 180 cm (5 ft 11 in)
- Weight: 88 kg (194 lb)

Playing career^{1}
Years	Club	Games (Goals)
1984 – 1986	West Perth	38 (93)
1986 – 1987	Claremont	32 (70)
1988	Central District	25 (48)
1989	North Melbourne	12 (12)
1990 – 1993	Essendon	77 (94)
1994 – 1996	Sydney	63 (73)
1997	Subiaco	12 (29)
Total		259 (419)
- ^{1} Playing statistics correct to the end of 1997.

Career highlights
- Leading Goal Kicker West Perth Football Club 1984 Claremont Premiership side 1987 R/Up Best & Fairest Claremont Football Club 1987 Record Number of Votes (46) Most in the Sandover Medal Count 1987 State Game WA vs SA, Best Player Award WACA 16 June 1987 State of Origin Game WA vs VIC, WACA 16 May 1989 State of Origin Game WA vs VIC, WACA 16 June 1990 State of Origin Game WA vs VIC MCG 26 May 1992 Leon Larkin Medal Winner WA vs VIC MCG 26 May 1992 Night Premiership Essendon vs Richmond 1993 State game WA vs Allies, Subiaco Oval 18 June 1995 State of Origin Game WA vs SA Football Park 2 June 1996 Graham Moss Medal Winner WA vs SA Football Park 2 June 1996

Derek Thomas Kickett (born 6 October 1962) is a former Australian rules footballer. Kickett played with seven different VFL/AFL, WAFL and SANFL clubs during his career.

== Early career ==
Derek is related to a number of other past and present high-profile AFL footballers from the Kickett family, including Dale Kickett and Lance "Buddy" Franklin, who are both his nephews. His other nephews are Byron Pickett and Jarrod Garlett. A well-known cousin of Derek Kickett's is Nicky Winmar.

Kickett played in the junior ranks at Central District in the South Australian National Football League, including their U-19s Premiership in 1981. Beginning his senior career in the West Australian Football League with West Perth, he was the leading goalkicker at West Perth in 1984. After falling out with the Falcons early in the 1986 season, Kickett, along with veteran Peter Spencer, applied for a clearance to Claremont, which at first was denied but accepted a week later. Whilst Spencer played only two senior games for Claremont and returned for his last season to his original home at East Perth, Derek Kickett fitted in perfectly and was a key member of the Tigers’ record-breaking 1987 team that finished with twenty-one consecutive unbeaten matches and their sixth senior flag. Kickett polled 46 votes in the Sandover Medal in 1987, which was the most of any player that season, but was ineligible to win due to a suspension for slapping East Fremantle's Tim Gepp. Kickett would have won the Sandover Medal by sixteen votes if he had been eligible.^{Note 1,}

Kickett returned to Central District in 1988 for one season. In 1989, he was recruited by North Melbourne in the Victorian Football League, where he also played only one season before being delisted.

== Career with Essendon ==
In 1990, Kickett moved to the Essendon Football Club, where he played four seasons, and became a popular cult figure, known for confident playing style, high leap, evasive skills and his long kicking ability. He was a renowned proponent of the torpedo punt. He played every match in 1992 and 1993, up to the preliminary final of 1993, before being infamously omitted from the Bombers' winning 1993 AFL Grand Final team by coach Kevin Sheedy. The omission continues to be one of the most controversial decisions of Sheedy's coaching career, but Sheedy still defends the decision, stating that Kickett's form was poor (as he had a total of 15 disposals in the three finals) and that his lack of endurance would have been a specific weakness for the team against Carlton, Essendon's opponent on the day. Kickett immediately walked out on the club; he did not watch the Grand Final, nor did he celebrate the victory with his teammates. Kickett and Sheedy did not speak to each again until 2018, some 25 years later.

== Move to Sydney ==
After leaving Essendon, Kickett was drafted by the Sydney Swans. He played three seasons at Sydney, and his last game of AFL football was in the 1996 AFL Grand Final, which Sydney lost against North Melbourne. Kickett returned to the WAFL in 1997, playing that season with Subiaco, before retiring.

Kickett has made several notable appearances in the E. J. Whitten Legends Game. In 2007, he ran development programs for AFL Victoria working with indigenous children.

In 2017, Kickett was inducted into the West Australian Football Hall of Fame.

== Footnotes ==
1. Kickett's 46 votes actually tied the record for the most votes in a Sandover Medal count, set in 1985 by Murray Wrensted, and remained a record until Matthew Priddis polled 58 votes in 2006; however, the Sandover Medal had changed from a 3-2-1 voting system to a 5-4-3-2-1 voting system in 1985, and comparisons with the counts between 1921 and 1984 are not valid.
