= Tim Gepp =

Australian rules footballer

Personal information
- Full name: Tim Gepp
- Born: 21 January 1960 (age 66)
- Original team: Subiaco
- Height: 182 cm (6 ft 0 in)
- Weight: 85 kg (187 lb)

Playing career^{1}
Years	Club	Games (Goals)
1978-1982	Subiaco	84 (9)
1983–1985	Richmond	57 (3)
1986	Footscray	14 (1)
1987-1988	East Fremantle	18 (1)
Total		173 (14)
- ^{1} Playing statistics correct to the end of 1988.

Tim Gepp (born 21 January 1960) is a former Australian rules footballer who played for Richmond and Footscray in the Victorian Football League (VFL), and Subiaco and East Fremantle in the West Australian Football League (WAFL).

Gepp, a half-back flanker, played 84 games for Subiaco between 1978 and 1982. He signed a contract with St Kilda and was expected to move at the end of the 1981 season, however he remained at Subiaco for the final year of his contract. He was then transferred to Richmond in 1983 and played in the opening round. Despite missing only one game in 1984 and playing every game in 1985, he was sacked by Richmond prior to the 1986 season due to salary cap problems, and signed with Footscray.

When Mick Malthouse, Gepp's coach at Footscray, became coach of the West Coast Eagles in 1990, Gepp was appointed as a skills coach. He remained at the Eagles for almost twenty years, becoming chairman of the selectors and being awarded life membership in 2007.
