= Gerard Neesham =

Australian rules footballer, born 1954

Personal information
- Full name: Gerard Joseph Neesham
- Born: 11 December 1954 (age 71)
- Original team: Fremantle CBC Amateurs
- Height: 175 cm (5 ft 9 in)
- Weight: 76 kg (168 lb)

Playing career^{1}
Years	Club	Games (Goals)
1975–77, 1985–86	East Fremantle	79 (51)
1979–1984	Swan Districts	97 (93)
1982	Sydney Swans	9 (1)
1987–1989	Claremont	42 (14)
Total		227 (159)

Coaching career
Years	Club	Games (W–L–D)
1987–1994	Claremont	171 (123–45–3)
1995–1998	Fremantle	88 (32–56–0)
Total		259 (155–101–3)
- ^{1} Playing statistics correct to the end of 1989.

Career highlights
- 5× WAFL Premiership player: (1983, 1984, 1985, 1987, 1989); 4× WAFL Premiership coach: (1987, 1989, 1991, 1993); 2× Swan Districts best and fairest: (1979, 1980); Inaugural Fremantle coach; West Australian Football Hall of Fame, inducted 2004

Gerard Joseph Neesham OAM (born 11 December 1954) is a former Australian rules footballer who played for the Sydney Swans in the Victorian Football League (VFL) and for the East Fremantle Football Club, Swan Districts Football Club and Claremont Football Club in the West Australian Football League (WAFL).

Hailing from a famous Western Australian sporting family, Neesham enjoyed a very successful football career both as a player and coach, and was recognised for his achievements in 2004 when he was inducted into the West Australian Football Hall of Fame. Since 2000, Neesham has been chief executive officer of the Clontarf Foundation. In 2011 when he was awarded the Medal of the Order of Australia as part of the Australia Day Honours List.

== Playing career ==
In the WAFL, Neesham played for East Fremantle in 79 games, Swan Districts in 97 games, and Claremont in 42 games. He also represented Western Australia three times.

=== Sydney Swans ===
He won the best and fairest at Swan Districts in 1979 and 1980 which led to him being noticed around the country as a top quality player. This led to Neesham having a brief and unsuccessful stint in the VFL with the Sydney Swans, where he played nine games for one goal in 1982.

He played in the last two of Swan Districts’ hat-trick of premierships in 1983 and 1984, and made it three in a row when he won a flag with East Fremantle in 1985.

== Coaching career ==
=== Claremont Football Club coach (WAFL) (1987–1994) ===
Neesham coached 259 games in total, 171 of which were for the Claremont Football Club in the WAFL. He won premierships in 1987 and 1989 as player-coach, and again in 1991 and 1993 as senior coach.

=== Fremantle Football Club senior coach (AFL) (1995–1998) ===
In 1995, he was appointed the inaugural senior coach of the Fremantle Football Club in the Australian Football League. While Neesham introduced an attacking and exciting style of game that exhibited flair, he had limited success as a coach, winning only 32 of his 88 games to a winning percentage of 36 percent. Fellow AFL coach David Parkin described Neesham’s gameplan, that encouraged possession and was influenced by Neesham’s water polo background, as before his time. Neesham's first season as Fremantle Football Club senior coach was their inaugural season in the 1995 season, Neesham led Fremantle to finish thirteenth on the ladder with eight wins and fourteen losses. In the 1996 season, Neesham led Fremantle to finish thirteenth on the ladder with seven wins and fifteen losses. In the 1997 season, Neesham led Fremantle to finish twelve on the ladder with ten wins and twelve losses. In the 1998 season, Fremantle's on-field performance under Neesham dropped when they finished fifteenth in (second-last) position on the ladder with seven wins and fifteen losses. At the end of the 1998 season, Neesham was sacked as Fremantle Football Club senior coach after Fremantle Football Club chairman Ross Kelly showed him the door. Neesham was replaced by former Geelong player and Sydney assistant coach, Damian Drum as Fremantle Football Club senior coach.

Neesham is a member of the West Australian Football Hall of Fame.

== Clontarf Foundation ==
After leaving the AFL system Neesham became a teacher at Clontarf Aboriginal College and was asked to coach the school’s football team. As an ex-AFL coach, Neesham's presence attracted a number of students and he saw the opportunity to use football as encouragement for the students to remain at school and improve their lives. In 2000 he set up the Clontarf Foundation, which encourages school and football participation amongst Indigenous youth in Western Australia. He is the chief executive officer and now runs 119 Academies across Australia, with a total enrolment of approximately 9,000 students.
