= Mark Watson (Australian footballer) =

Australian rules football player and coach

Personal information
- Born: 4 April 1960 (age 66)
- Original team: Denmark
- Position: Midfielder

Playing career
Years	Club	Games (Goals)
1980–1984	Claremont	73 (66)
1985–1990	Perth	119 (127)
Total		192 (193)

Coaching career
Years	Club	Games (W–L–D)
1993–1994	South Fremantle	43 (17-26-0)

Career highlights
- Sandover Medal: 1987; Butcher Medal (Perth B&F): 1987, 1988, 1989; WAFL Premiership: 1981

Mark Douglas Anton Watson (born 4 April 1960) is a retired Australian rules football player and coach. He played for Claremont and Perth in the West Australian Football League (WAFL), winning the 1987 Sandover Medal as the league's best player. He also coached South Fremantle for two seasons.

== Personal life ==
Watson grew up on the family dairy farm in Denmark, Western Australia, one of three brothers. He has four children with his wife Gail and worked as a crane operator at Fremantle Ports after leaving football.

== Playing career ==
Watson won four consecutive premierships from 1978 to 1981 as a centreman with Denmark in the Southern Districts Football League. He moved to Perth to train with Claremont. After five senior games in his debut WAFL season in 1980, he had a breakthrough year and played in the club's 1981 premiership victory over South Fremantle.

Watson moved to Perth for the 1985 WAFL season. He won three consecutive Butcher Medals from 1987 to 1989 as the club's best and fairest player. He also won the 1987 Sandover Medal as the league's best and fairest player; his tally of 30 votes was far behind the 46 votes of Derek Kickett, but Kickett was ineligible due to suspension. Watson finished his career at the end of the 1990 WAFL season with a total of 192 games and 193 goals. He also played three state games for WA.

== Coaching career ==
Watson was appointed coach of South Fremantle for the 1993 WAFL season. The team placed fifth, losing to Subiaco in the elimination final, but won only six games the following season to place sixth. He was replaced by club stalwart John Todd. Watson later coached the Rockingham Rams amateur side for four seasons.
