= John Georgiades =

Australian rules footballer (born 1966)

Personal information
- Born: 3 January 1966 (age 60)
- Original team: Subiaco (WAFL)
- Draft: No. 35, 1988 national draft
- Debut: 1989, Footscray vs. Carlton, at Princes Park
- Height: 185 cm (6 ft 1 in)
- Weight: 83 kg (183 lb)

Playing career^{1}
Years	Club	Games (Goals)
1986–1988 & 1991-1993	Subiaco	103 (168)
1989–1991	Footscray	15 (27)
Total		118 (195)
- ^{1} Playing statistics correct to the end of 1991.

Career highlights
- WAFL premiership player: 1988

John Georgiades (born 3 January 1966) is a former Australian rules footballer who played for Subiaco in the West Australian Football League (WAFL) and Footscray in the Australian Football League (AFL).

Georgiades made his debut for Subiaco in the 1986 WAFL season. An "abundantly skilled half-forward", he had a breakout year in 1988, kicking 65 goals from 22 games. He finished runner-up to Todd Breman in the Bernie Naylor Medal. He capped off his season by kicking six goals in Subiaco's premiership victory over Claremont in the 1988 WAFL Grand Final, and was regarded as unlucky not to win the Simpson Medal as best on ground. He also polled 25 votes in the Sandover Medal, only five behind the eventual winner Mark Watson.

Georgiades was drafted by Footscray at number 35 at the 1988 VFL Draft. He is remembered for his debut in Round 1 of the 1989 season where he kicked 8 goals against Carlton. Only three players have kicked more goals on debut in VFL/AFL history. Georgiades played 15 games over three seasons at Footscray.

Georgiades's son, Mitch, made his AFL debut for Port Adelaide in round one of the 2020 AFL season.
