= Todd Breman =

Australian rules footballer & cricketer, born 1965

- Born: Todd George Breman; 28 October 1965 (age 61); Subiaco, Western Australia
Australian rules football career
Personal information
- Original team: Subiaco (WAFL)
- Draft: No. 2, 1988 national draft
Playing career^{1}
Years	Club	Games (Goals)
1989–1990	West Coast	23 (15)
1992–1993	Richmond	25 (24)
Total		48 (39)
- ^{1} Playing statistics correct to the end of 1993.
Career highlights
- Bernie Naylor Medal 1988, 1989
- Cricket career

Cricket information
- Batting: Right-handed
- Bowling: Right-arm medium

Domestic team information
- Years: Team
- 1985/86–1986/87: Western Australia
- FC debut: 10 January 1986 Western Australia v New South Wales
- Last FC: 18 December 1987 Western Australia v Queensland
- LA debut: 16 February 1986 Western Australia v Queensland
- Last LA: 26 December 1987 Western Australia v Sri Lankans

Career statistics
Competition	First-class	List A
Matches	10	5
Runs scored	203	193
Batting average	18.45	16.00
100s/50s	0/0	0/0
Top score	45*	21
Balls bowled	1404	192
Wickets	22	4
Bowling average	30.31	48.25
5 wickets in innings	1	0
10 wickets in match	0	0
Best bowling	6/76	2/64
Catches/stumpings	4/0	0/0
- Source: CricketArchive, 11 July 2016

Todd George Breman (born 28 October 1965) is a former cricketer and Australian rules footballer.

== Cricket career ==
Breman debuted for Western Australia during the 1985–1986 season as a medium pace bowler. He played 10 first-class matches and five List A matches over three seasons.

He had played cricket in the summer and football in the winter with the Subiaco Football Club, before pursuing a full-time career in Australian rules football in the Victorian Football League (now AFL).

== Football career ==
After playing with the Subiaco Football Club in the WAFL and leading their goalscoring in 1987 and 1988, Breman was drafted in the 1988 VFL Draft to the West Coast Eagles. Debuting with the club in 1989, he played two seasons in the VFL/AFL before being cut.

After a year out of the AFL he was selected by the Richmond Football Club in 1992 before his AFL career ended after the 1993 season.

Breman was widely regarded as one of the longest kickers of an Australian rules football to have played the game. In 1991, Kevin Sheedy described him as the best footballer outside of the AFL.
