= Kevin Caton =

Australian rules footballer

Personal information
- Full name: Kevin Bernard Caton
- Born: 10 May 1965 (age 61)
- Original team: Darwin (NTFL)
- Draft: No. 17, 1989 pre-season draft
- Height: 183 cm (6 ft 0 in)
- Weight: 76 kg (168 lb)

Playing career^{1}
Years	Club	Games (Goals)
1984–1989, 1991–1994	Swan Districts	119 (274)
1988	West Coast Eagles	1 (1)
1989	Fitzroy	9 (8)
1990–1991	Brisbane Bears	8 (9)
Total		137 (292)

Representative team honours
Years	Team	Games (Goals)
1985	Western Australia	2 (1)
- ^{1} Playing statistics correct to the end of 1994.

Career highlights
- 1984 Swan Districts premiership player; 1992 Bernie Naylor Medal winner

Kevin Bernard Caton (born 10 May 1965) is a retired Australian rules footballer who played in the VFL/AFL for the West Coast Eagles, Fitzroy and Brisbane Bears.
