= History of the West Coast Eagles =

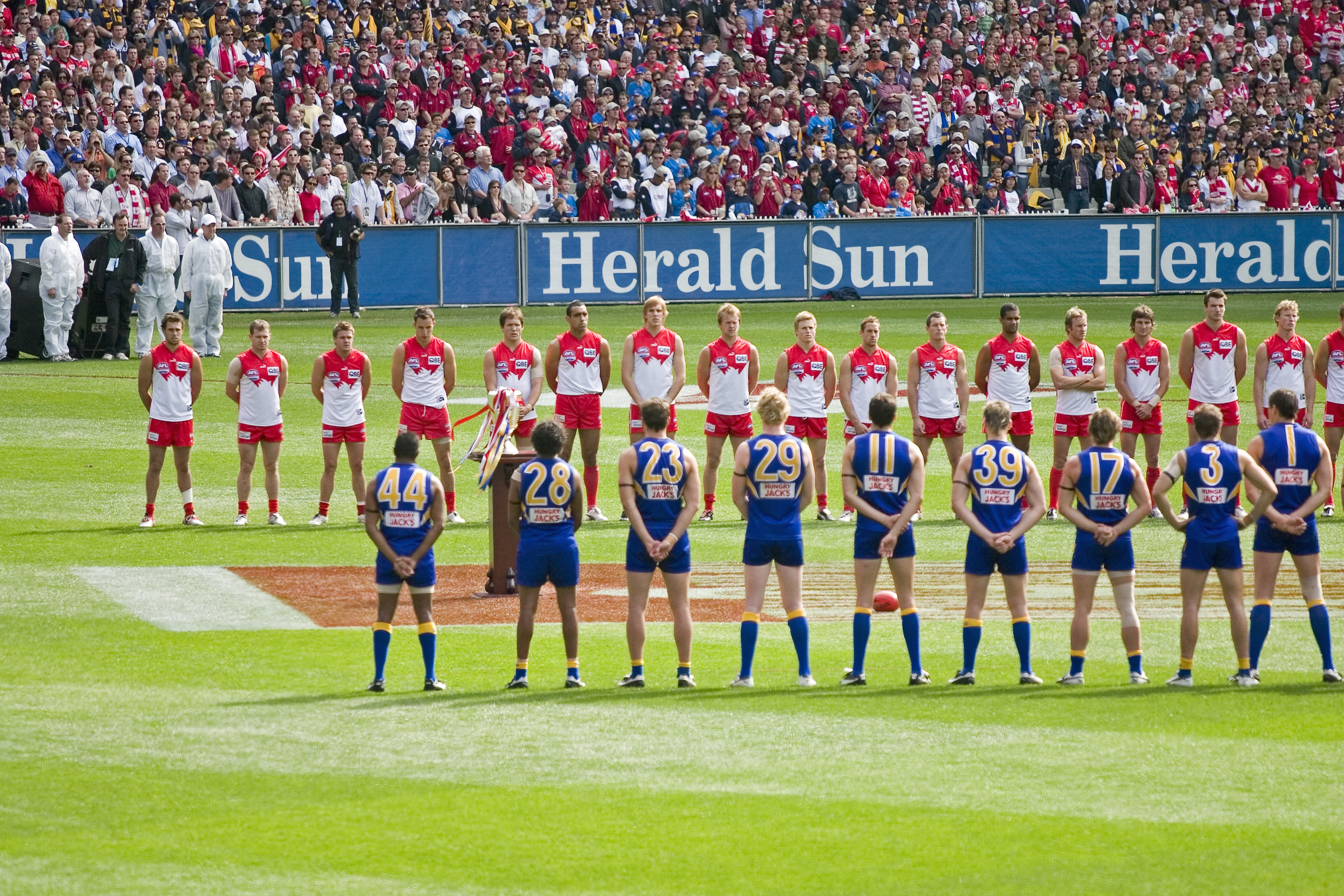
The West Coast Eagles and Sydney Swans line up for the Australian national anthem at the 2005 Grand Final.

The West Coast Eagles is an Australian rules football club based in Perth, Western Australia, currently playing in the Australian Football League (AFL). The club was formed in 1986, and played its first season in the competition in 1987. Having lost the 1991 grand final to Hawthorn, the club won premierships in 1992 and 1994, becoming one of the most successful teams of the 1990s. West Coast won its third premiership in 2006, but fell in a heap after that, finishing last in 2010, before undergoing a rapid resurgence the following season to finish fourth in 2011.

Premiership era

In 2015, the club reached a sixth Grand Final, again going down to Hawthorn. In 2018, West Coast defeated Collingwood to win its fourth Premiership, making it the most successful Non-Victorian team in the modern era.

Modern-day era

The 2020s were unforgiving for the Eagles. Since Round 14 of the 2021 season, the Eagles have won only 7 fixtures from 55 games up to Round 24 of the 2023 season.

2023 The Eagles were thrashed by bottom side Hawthorn by 116-points in round 10, 2023 and then in round 13, were humiliated by 122-points by the Adelaide Crows. Then in round 15, the Eagles suffered further humiliation as they were beaten by a staggering 171-points by the Sydney Swans, making it their biggest loss since joining the AFL in 1987. The 2023 season also marked the worst losing streak for the club, having lost 16 games straight from Round 3 to Round 19. However, in Round 20, the Eagles snapped a 16-game losing streak in thrilling fashion, digging deep to cling on to a 5-point win over the Kangaroos, easing pressure of the club and coach Adam Simpson. Further on in round 21, the Eagles suffered a heart breaking loss in the hands of Essendon by 1-point. However, that was short-lived following a 101-point derby disaster smashing by Fremantle, marking it their biggest derby loss ever in history. Though things seemed bleak for West Coast, they responded by pipping Western Bulldogs in a shock upset by 7 points, easing pressure on Simpson and the club again. With club champions Shannon Hurn, Nic Naitanui and Luke Shuey departing the club, the Eagles finished their last game of 2023 with a 45-point loss to the Adelaide Crows.

2024 The West Coast Eagles opened their 2024 campaign with a 50-point loss to Port Adelaide. Further huge losses to the GWS Giants and Western Bulldogs by a 65-point and 76-point margin respectively shaped another season to forget for the Eagles. With the first three matches turning into big losses, the Eagles turned the corner by bringing up a spirited showing against the Sydney Swans, and although losing by 26-points, they followed up by beating Richmond in a shock 39-point dominating upset win. West Coast dominated Derby 58, winning Fremantle by 37-points to notch back-to-back victories for the first time since 2021. Positive showings followed despite a 37-point loss to Gold Coast and a heartbreaking 6-point loss to Essendon. Although Collingwood won by 66-points in a round 9 Marvel stadium thrashing, the Eagles regained their home ground fortress on the back of a Harley Reid show to upset the Demons by 35-points the next round. Following the dynamo Reid's display, Adelaide thumped West Coast by 99-points away before the Eagles returned to their Optus Stadium home against some supposedly easy-beats. However, they lost against St Kilda by 14-points and the next week winless North Melbourne claimed their first victory by 9-points against West Coast at Optus. The Eagles then lost to Essendon by 30-points, and a 61-point defeat by Hawthorn and 54-points by Melbourne caused pressure to pile on coach Adam Simpson, just like last year. This all compounded and on 10 July, 'Big Simmo' was told to 'take a short stroll of a long bridge'.

== VFL licence bid and club formation ==
During the 1980s, the VFL and WAFL were struggling and both leagues came to the conclusion that a national league was the key to their survival, the VFL Commission voted in 1986 to grant licenses to Perth and Brisbane. Australian rules football in Western Australia was a traditional heartland for the sport had been steadily growing over the decades producing strong performances in interstate football despite having most of its star players poached by Victorian clubs causing interest in the WAFL to decline. While consortias had begun a fierce bidding war in Brisbane, Western Australia and South Australia, with their strong local competitions, remained indifferent to the idea of joining the national competition. Nevertheless, a private company, Indian Pacific headed by Richard Colless began testing the water in the West Australian market.

Support for a Western Australian VFL team from the WAFL and public changed on 8 July after Western Australia won the 1986 Australian Football Championships, proving itself to be stronger than Victoria in the sport (in contrast, the state had performed poorly in State of Origin the previous year, so public support was buoyant following the dramatic turnaround). In late July 1986 Colless convened a meeting in Melbourne of West Australians from the VFL clubs (including Ross Glendinning, Simon Beasley, Brad Hardie, Ken Hunter, Wayne Blackwell, Gary Buckenara, Rod Lester-Smith and Alan Johnson) to gauge interest in and viability of a Western Australian-based VFL side, however, denied that it was working with the WAFL or actively pursuing a VFL license. By 7 August 1986, Western Australia had put the VFL on notice that it wanted in to the national competition.

Indian Pacific Limited formally applied for the Western Australian license in August 1986. Ross Oakley of the VFL agreed to an annual license of $400,000 for 10 years. However, the application was rejected at a meeting of VFL clubs, with struggling Victorian clubs claiming they could not afford to lose star Western Australian players or to travel to Perth. In response Oakley negotiated a deal with the clubs that it would agree to the expansion only if the full $4 million was paid up front as a lump sum license (the same offer made to bids from Brisbane), Oakley was convinced that the Perth arrangement would be viable with increased television rights from the a new audience offsetting the cost of flights for VFL clubs. The VFL had advised clubs Fitzroy Football Club and Footscray Football Club that were considered almost certain to fold, to vote for the inclusion of Perth in order to survive in the competition.

The West Australian license was formally granted on 1 October 1986 and even before the club had formed or found the required license fee, the entity headed by Colless immediately began securing contracts with West Australian VFL players. On 20 October 1986, a club was formed under the trading under the name of the "West Coast Eagles Football Club", just two weeks after the formation of the Brisbane Football Club (later Brisbane Bears).

The club was given only 160 days to assemble a team and establish an infrastructure for its inaugural season, 1987. The club appointed Ron Alexander as its first head coach on 22 September 1986 and revealed its 32-men squad for its first season on 30 October that year.

== First years in competition: 1987–1989 ==
Inaugural VFL match	G	B	Total
West Coast	20	13	133
Richmond	16	23	119
Venue: Subiaco	crowd: 23,897

The club's first official home-and-away match at Subiaco Oval against Richmond on 29 March 1987 was played before a crowd of 23,897. The fledgling Eagles, down by 33 points at the final change, somehow managed to outscore the visiting and tiring Tigers nine goals to one in the final term to run out 14-point winners – a club record last quarter comeback that lasted until round 10 of 2006. By season's end, the club had split its games with eleven wins and eleven losses for a seventh-place finish, but despite this quite respectable effort, inaugural coach Ron Alexander was sacked from the position and replaced with WA coaching legend John Todd.

The 1988 season saw the Eagles improve to become one of the strongest teams of the competition, finishing the home and away season in fourth, before narrowly losing the Elimination Final to Melbourne by two points. Despite this loss, the mood was upbeat at the club for the future, although it was the last game for inaugural captain Glendinning.

However, the 1989 season put the club under a lot of pressure. Injuries and poor form led to the club only winning two matches in the first fifteen rounds of the season, culminating in the "Windy Hill Massacre", where the Eagles lost by a club record 142 points to Essendon. In the nadir of this season, with major financial problems besetting the club and a bleak outlook, there was even talk of disbanding the club and reverting to the WAFL as the senior competition in Western Australia. However, the Eagles rallied with five wins in the last seven weeks of the season. While it was enough to stave off the wolves, it was not enough to keep John Todd in the role of senior coach, nor allow first year captain Murray Rance to retain the role.

== Malthouse arrival and first Grand Final: 1990–1991 ==
1991 Grand Final	G	B	Total
Hawthorn	20	19	139
West Coast	13	8	86
Venue: Waverley Park	crowd: 75,320

1991 AFL Home & Away Season	W	L	D	Total	%
West Coast	19	3	0	76	162.21
	Minor Premiers

As the VFL made way for the new AFL, the Eagles entered the 1990s with a new coach, Mick Malthouse, a Victorian recruited from Footscray, and a new captain in Steve Malaxos who had won the club's first club champion award in 1987. The change in leadership, and the rise of a few younger players, led to a resurgence at the club winning sixteen games on the way to a third-place finish at the end of the home and away season. This led to a berth in the Qualifying Final against Collingwood, which resulted in a famous draw, but the Eagles could not win the replay, and despite beating Melbourne in the First Semi Final, bowed out a fortnight later to Essendon in the Preliminary Final.

As 1991 started, out of favour captain Malaxos was replaced with youngster John Worsfold. That didn't seem to affect the club as the season saw what was probably the most dominant Eagles side, winning the first 12 games of the season and 19 in the home-and-away series (a record that still stands today) en route to the minor premiership—the first time a non-Victorian side had topped the ladder. However, the young team struggled with the finals pressure exerted by such a dominant season, and while they made the 1991 AFL Grand Final, it was lost to Hawthorn by 53 points in front of a crowd of 75,230. It was the only Grand Final ever to be played at Waverley Park, and the first in the AFL to feature a non-Victorian side.

== Premiership success: 1992–1994 ==
1992 Grand Final	G	B	Total
West Coast	16	17	113
Geelong	12	13	85
Venue: MCG	crowd: 95,007

The Eagles weren't as strong through the 1992 season, but managed to get a reasonable spot in the finals, winning a classic final against Hawthorn on the way to a Grand Final appearance, this time against Geelong at the MCG. The Eagles struggled early in the match, trailing by as much as four goals, but ended up over-running the Cats to win by 28 points and claim the club's first ever premiership, with Peter Matera winning the Norm Smith Medal for best on ground. The 1992 Premiership was the first senior AFL premiership won by a team from outside Victoria.

1994 Grand Final	G	B	Total
West Coast	20	23	143
Geelong	8	15	63
Venue: MCG	crowd: 93,860

1994 AFL Home & Away Season	W	L	D	Total	%
West Coast	16	6	0	64	132.19
	Minor Premiers

The year of 1993 saw relatively little premiership points separate the finalists, and although West Coast were in the mix, the team never fully clicked across the season.

In 1994 the Eagles again won the minor premiership at the end of the home and away season – the club's second McClelland Trophy. This time they managed to carry the form through the finals series, despite a scare in the opening week of the finals when Collingwood nearly sneaked over the line in a close game at the WACA Ground. In the end the Eagles did not lose a match in the series, culminating in an 80-point thrashing of Geelong in the Grand Final for the club's second premiership. Dean Kemp was awarded the Norm Smith Medal for best on ground on this occasion.

== New rivalry: 1995–1996 ==
In 1995, a local AFL club rival the Fremantle Football Club was introduced to the WA football market, heightening competition for the West Australian audience and forming a fierce rivalry to become the Western Derby, a twice yearly encounter between the two clubs. The derby was for much of the 90s a West Coast affair, with the Eagles winning the first nine encounters before the Dockers finally won the later derby of 1999.

Western Derby I	G	B	Total
West Coast	23	13	151
Fremantle	9	12	66
Venue: Subiaco	crowd: 40,356

Meanwhile, the club's performances on the field slipped a little from the heights of the early 90s, but never so far as to not make the finals. After bowing out quietly in 1995, the Eagles won their opening final in 1996, resulting in what would normally have been a home semi final against Essendon. However, due to what Eagles fans saw as a poorly constructed contract between the league and the MCG, the game was scheduled to be played at the MCG instead of Subiaco. In all the furore the Eagles were comprehensively thrashed. On a brighter note, young Eagle Ben Cousins won the club's first AFL Rising Star award for the best rookie in the competition for 1996.

== Finals failure: 1997–1999 ==
The 1997 and 1998 seasons saw the Eagles mostly making up numbers in the finals, bowing out early both years, with the most notable incident being when captain John Worsfold was dropped for what would have been his final appearance in the 1998 Semi Final; oddly mirroring what happened to his predecessor in the role, Steve Malaxos, who was dropped for the 1990 Preliminary Final and never played for the club again. Worsfold was replaced in the captaincy by his vice captain, Guy McKenna.

In the second week of the 1999 season the Eagles again found themselves in the situation where they earned a home final (after beating the Western Bulldogs at the MCG in the first week), but once again the MCG contract stripped the club of the right to host the final (the higher-ranked Brisbane Lions, who finished 3rd, kept its home final as a reward for finishing higher than the Eagles), and the Eagles faced Carlton and lost on the road. This rule later cost the Adelaide Crows the right to host a Semi Final in 2002, and the Brisbane Lions a Preliminary Final in 2004 (both of which were played against Victorian opposition at the MCG) before it was finally abolished.

The 1999 season is probably more remembered for the continual rumours that linked coach Mick Malthouse to the senior coaching role at Collingwood; the rumours ended up being proven correct when Malthouse was released from his contract to the club for the 2000 season, to be replaced with Ken Judge. Also notable in 1999 was the first Eagle to top the AFL goalkicking, when Scott Cummings won the Coleman Medal with 95 goals but did not make the All Australian Team.

== Ken Judge failure: 2000–2001 ==
The Eagles might have started Judge's reign as coach impressively, thrashing reigning premiers North Melbourne in the opening game of 2000, and winning two games by over 100 points in three weeks against Adelaide and Fremantle, but it was to turn sour quite quickly in the latter part of the 2000 season. Sitting at six wins and five losses at the halfway point of the season, injury struck, and West Coast slumped to win only one more match for the season, and missing the finals for the first time since 1989, and another change of captaincy, as McKenna retired to be replaced with Dean Kemp and Ben Cousins as co-captains. The Eagles also introduced much-maligned ochre and tricolour guernseys to their home and away uniforms in these years, which have since been abandoned for the more traditional uniforms worn in previous years.

However, as bad as 2000 might have been, the 2001 season was even worse. In a shocking season, crueled by injury, older players falling away, and general mutterings of dissatisfaction, the club finished 14th. En route, they won only five matches for the entire year, all against other bottom four sides. Judge was sacked after the season, to be replaced in turn by former premiership captain John Worsfold.

== John Worsfold arrival: 2002–2004 ==
Worsfold seemingly walked into an impossible situation in his first senior coaching role: a team that was widely tipped to slump further to the bottom of the ladder. Most fans would have been satisfied with just an improvement in performance, but Worsfold and his mostly young charges were almost unbeatable at home, and snuck a couple of crucial away wins to make an unexpected finals appearance on the back of an eleven-win – eleven-loss home and away season in 2002. The Eagles lost first up and were eliminated, but it was a sign of improvement to come. The 2002 season saw the debut of 2001 draft pick Chris Judd in its round two match against Collingwood.

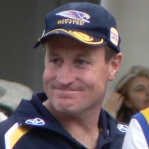
2002–2013 coach John Worsfold

The 2003 and 2004 seasons were opposites of each other. In 2003, the Eagles ran riot early, sitting in the high reaches of the ladder mid-season before injury took out the second part of the season and the club slumped to finish just inside the finals, and were bundled straight out; in 2004, the season was looking down the barrel early, but a dramatic late-season recovery saw the Eagles steal a spot in the finals in the last week of the home and away season, only to be thrashed in a thunderstorm by the Sydney Swans first up.

2004, however, saw the first ever Eagle to win Australian Football's highest individual award, when Chris Judd won the Brownlow Medal in a canter. Previous best West Coast performances had been runner-up efforts from Craig Turley in 1991, Peter Matera in 1994 and 1997, and Ben Cousins in 2003.

== Sydney rivalry: 2005 ==
2005 Grand Final	G	B	Total
Sydney	8	10	58
West Coast	7	12	54
Venue: MCG	crowd: 91,828

2005 Wizard Home Loans Cup Grand Final	SG	G	B	Total
Carlton	1	14	18	111
West Coast	1	11	9	84
Venue: Telstra Dome	crowd: 43,391

Season 2005 saw the Eagles start by accounting for all opponents in the opening eight weeks before losing to then-bottom-placed Collingwood. The Eagles, however, recovered to be as much as five games clear, before a poor run home saw the club lose the final week and surrender the minor premiership to the Adelaide Crows. Despite this, the Eagles turned it around in the finals to make the Grand Final against the Sydney Swans. However, in reverse of the result in the 2005 Qualifying Final which the Eagles won by 4 points, the Swans managed to hold out the Eagles to win the low scoring encounter by four points. There was some consolation for Eagles fans with Chris Judd being awarded the Norm Smith medal in a losing side which, with captain Ben Cousins having already won the Brownlow Medal, highlighted the quality of the West Coast midfield.

== Third premiership: 2006 ==
2006 AFL Home & Away Season	W	L	D	Total	%
West Coast	17	5	0	64	120.44
	Minor Premiers

Despite promises to turn it around in 2006, the season looked set to start badly, with Cousins stripped of his captaincy, former All-Australian ruckman Michael Gardiner relegated to play at Claremont in the WAFL for continued indiscretions including drinking the night before a practise match and Ashley Sampi having some domestic trouble. Chris Judd was appointed to replace Cousins as expected, while Gardiner did make it back to the club to play a couple of games, before crashing his car whilst under the influence of alcohol – which saw him made persona non-grata at the club, and traded to St Kilda.

2006 Grand Final	G	B	Total
West Coast	12	13	85
Sydney	12	12	84
Venue: MCG	crowd: 97,431

Despite all this, the Eagles started the season in fairly good form, winning eleven of the opening twelve matches, including a couple of notable comebacks; particularly a club record recovery against Geelong from 54 points down in the third quarter. The Eagles then struggled for a few weeks, slipping off the pace, before good late season form enabled them to win the minor premiership at the end of the season over a slipping Adelaide Crows, the club's third McClelland Trophy.

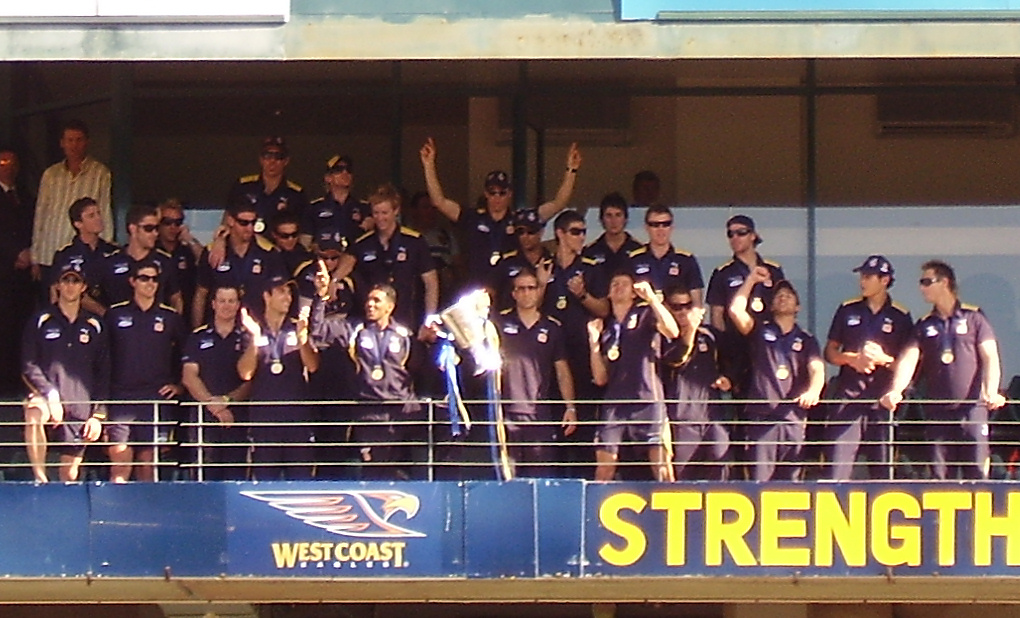
The West Coast Eagles 2006 Premiership team, at their welcome home at Subiaco Oval, the day after their win.

In the 2006 finals, the Eagles were favourites in every game and lost the opening match at Subiaco to Sydney by 1 point, but came back strong to thrash the Bulldogs in the Semi Final, and come from behind against the Crows in the Preliminary Final to book a berth in the Grand Final, once again against the Swans. The Grand Final ended up with a mirror of the 2006 Qualifying Final result between these two teams, the Eagles winning one of the great Grand Finals of recent years by a solitary point. The first Grand Final decided by this margin since 1966. Andrew Embley was awarded the Norm Smith medal for best on ground.

== End of an era: 2007 ==
The Eagles 2007 pre-season was the most turbulent in the club's history, with midfielder Daniel Kerr charged with assault for two separate incidents, and former captain (and 2005 Brownlow Medallist) Ben Cousins suspended from the club indefinitely after continued breaches of team rules, most notably not turning up to training, leading to massive amounts of speculative reporting in the media. Despite this, the Eagles started the season in good form, winning their opening 6 matches, including another one-point victory over the Sydney Swans. However, the Eagles of 2007 were nowhere near as dominant as those of 2005 or 2006. Instead, the Eagles spent much of the year in the bottom part of the top four, even slipping out of the top four at times. At the end of the season, the Eagles finished third on the ladder, drawing an away final at Port Adelaide in the opening week of the finals.

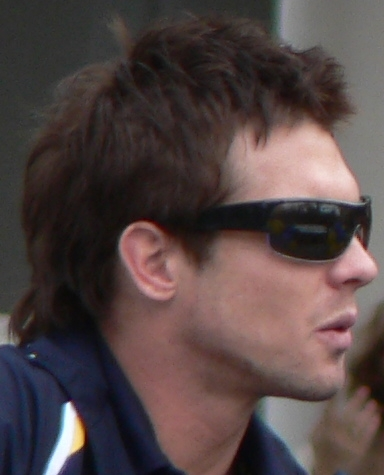
Ben Cousins.

The Eagles finals series was cruelled by injuries to key players, something that had been quite common in the latter half of the season, exacerbated by a hamstring injury to Ben Cousins when leading Port Adelaide in the first week. Ultimately West Coast crashed out of the finals in straight sets, losing to Port by three points in the opening week before losing to Collingwood by 19 points in a highly exciting final that went into extra time for only the second time since the extra time rule had been implemented.

In a blow to the club, premiership captain Chris Judd declared his intention to move back to his home city of Melbourne for the 2008 season, prompting much speculation over his final destination.

Capping off an annus horribilis for the club, former Eagles champion Chris Mainwaring died on 1 October 2007, at his home, and his death was widely reported to be the result of drug-taking. This became a major issue in the media, when it was revealed that Cousins had visited Mainwaring at his home the same night, just prior to his death. Cousins volunteered for a drug test following the event. This – on top of Cousins' banishment, Chris Judd's departure and a string of minor incidents (such as Michael Braun's Western Derby speech stunt and the Adam Selwood incident involving Des Headland, all in the Western Derby) – contributed to an impression that 2007 was a disaster for the Eagles, despite a relatively successful year on the field. The view gained further resonance when Ben Cousins was sacked by the club on 17 October 2007 after being arrested for drug possession and other offences the previous day. On 19 November, the AFL Commission found Cousins guilty of "bringing the game into disrepute" and banned him from playing in the league for one year.

== Final misses: 2008–2010 ==
These years saw the Eagles miss the finals for its first set of three consecutive seasons. At the end of the 2009 season, the Eagles won 4 out of their last 5 matches, including beating premiership contenders Western Bulldogs and ending their 20 loss streak for away matches and their 18 loss streak away from Paterson Stadium. Their 2010 season looked set to get better after a promising end to the 2009 season. However, the Eagles continued downhill and culminated in them 'winning' the 2010 wooden spoon, the first in the club's history, having won for the season four games for matches.

2010 AFL Home & Away Season	W	L	D	Total	%
West Coast	4	18	0	16	77.09
	Wooden Spooners

By most accounts, the Eagles' tumble to the bottom of the ladder was in part because club management undertook a root-and-branch housecleaning in the wake of the Cousins affair. There had been rumours of a drug culture surrounding the club as early as 2005, and management reportedly shied away from certain players to avoid a repeat. Then-chairman Andrew Barnaba said that he would rather have "a very strong club" than a winner. Despite this, after the 2010 debacle, Worsfold's tenure as coach was thought to be on the nose.

== Breakthrough: 2011 ==
The 2011 season started on a bright note for the West Coast Eagles with the club registering two wins to start the season: a narrow four-point victory over North Melbourne in the opening round of the season, and ending a 9-game losing streak at AAMI Stadium against Port Adelaide by 18 points in round 2. Their undefeated start to the season, however, came to a shuddering halt with a narrow 13-point defeat to their 2005/2006 Grand Final nemesis, the Sydney Swans, at home. This remained their only loss at home for the season.

They did, however, bounce back in the following two rounds; narrowly losing to one of the premiership favourites Hawthorn at Aurora Stadium in Tasmania and comfortably beating Melbourne at home by 9 goals. Round 7 saw the Eagles lose to a young Essendon outfit at Etihad Stadium by 16 points, after leading for majority of the match and Daniel Kerr picking up 28 disposals and a goal. The round 8 derby proved somewhat of an easy challenge as the Eagles overcame their cross-town rivals Fremantle by 33 points, despite missing stars Daniel Kerr and Andrew Embley due to injuries in the warm-up. Matt Priddis won the Ross Glendinning Medal for best-on-ground in the derby. Round 9 saw the West Coast Eagles cruise to a 123-point win against the Western Bulldogs with a 10-goal to none final quarter. Josh Kennedy kicked 10 goals and Luke Shuey kicked 5 goals for the game.

It was announced on 12 April that West Coast would be dropping Hungry Jack's as a sponsor, ending a 25-year partnership. West Coast will form a new partnership with Bankwest, which, ironically, were the former sponsors of cross town rivals Fremantle.

In round 14, the Eagles comfortably beat Carlton at Etihad Stadium by 36 points. In this match, Nic Naitanui took one of the marks of the year and this was the first game that the Eagles had beaten Carlton since former Eagles and current Carlton skipper Chris Judd left the Eagles at the end of the 2007.

Round 16 saw the Eagles defeat the ladder leaders Geelong in a 96–88 match, who had only been defeated in one game the whole season coming the week prior to Essendon. This created an opportunity for the team to push into the top 4 sides on the AFL Ladder and secure a home final. It was their first win over the Cats since Round 10, 2006 and first at home since Round 2, 2005. At season's end, the West Coast Eagles finished 4th on the ladder taking the double chance into the finals.

West Coast then entered its first finals campaign in four years, but lost its Qualifying Final against the defending premiers Collingwood. Granted a home final for finishing fourth at the end of the season, they then met Carlton in the second semi-final, and won a thriller by less than one goal after a late Carlton fightback stalled with only seconds remaining in the match. The Eagles' season of improvement then finished on a disappointing note losing convincingly to the eventual premiers Geelong whom they had beaten in Round 16 of the season.

The Eagles' jump from 16th to fourth is currently the equal most spots gained over one season; thus, the Eagles became the first team since the Brisbane Lions of 1998–1999 to reach a preliminary final twelve months after winning a wooden spoon.

== Final years under Worsfold: 2012–2013 ==
2012 NAB Cup Grand Final	SG	G	B	Total
Adelaide	2	10	17	95
West Coast	2	5	13	61
Venue: AAMI Stadium	crowd: 27,376

West Coast began 2012 strongly, losing the 2012 NAB Cup grand final to Adelaide and winning their opening six games, although they fell away towards the end of the season, eventually finishing in fifth position. The Eagles thrashed North Melbourne by 96 points in their elimination final match to advance to the semi-finals, where they lost by 13 points to Collingwood. The Eagles went into 2013 as premiership favourites, although injuries and poor form saw them finish in thirteenth position on the ladder, with the team losing its final three games by an average of 71 points. Coach John Worsfold resigned on 5 September 2013.

== Adam Simpson era and Fourth Premiership: 2014- ==
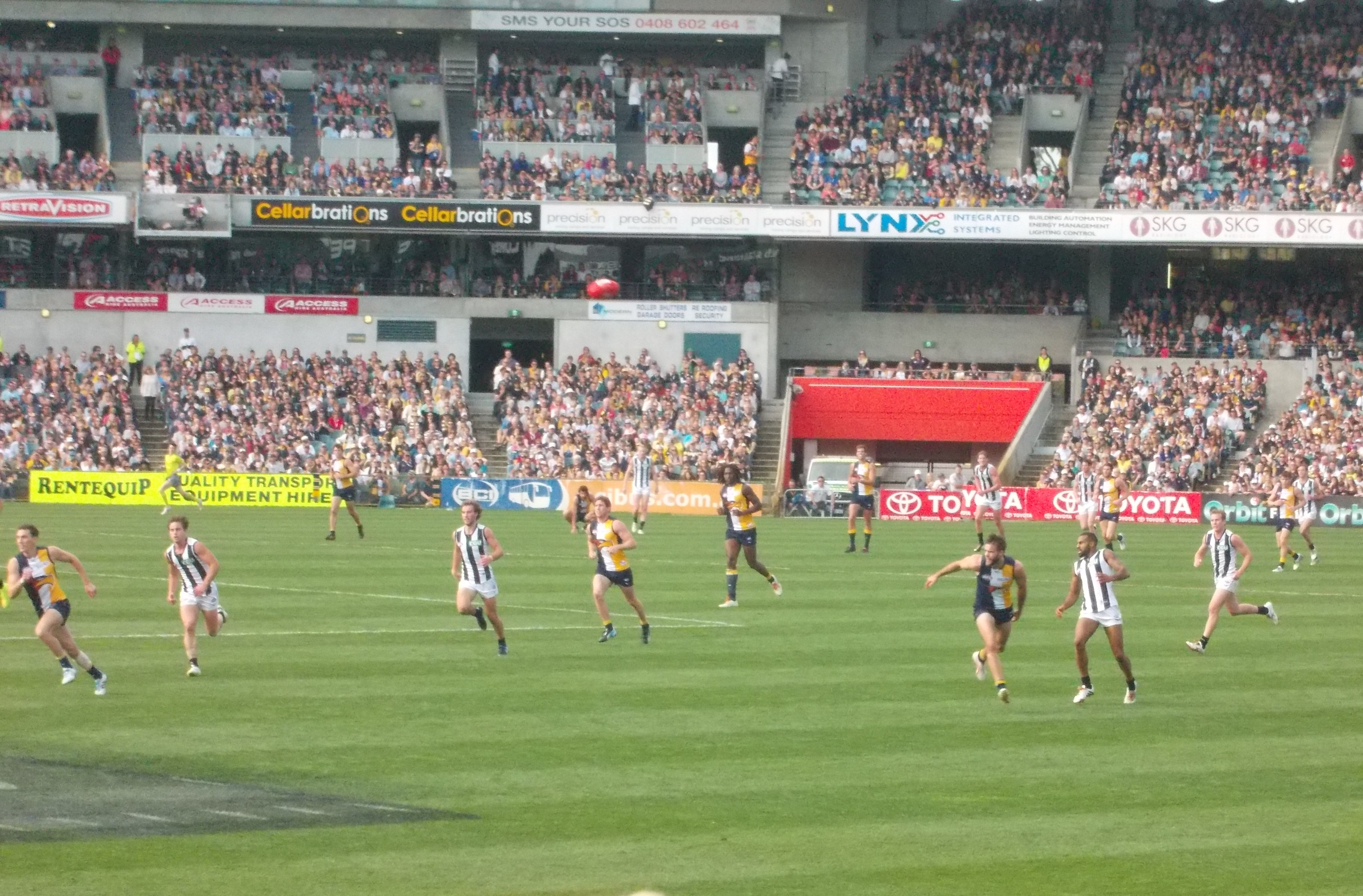
Round 20 2014 – West Coast vs Collingwood at Subiaco Oval

On 4 October 2013 former North Melbourne player Adam Simpson was announced as the team's new coach. Darren Glass was initially renamed as captain for 2014, but retired from football after round 12. He was replaced by five acting co-captains for the remainder of the season – Shannon Hurn, Josh Kennedy, Eric Mackenzie, Matt Priddis, and Scott Selwood. West Coast had a strong preseason and won their opening three matches, although they eventually finished in ninth position. During the season the club were labeled as "flat track bullies" due to beating lower placed teams by large margins, yet failing to defeat teams above them on the ladder. Midfielder Matt Priddis became the third Eagles player to win a Brownlow medal, winning the 2014 medal at the end of the season. Defender Shannon Hurn was named sole captain for 2015.

2015 Grand Final	G	B	Total
Hawthorn	16	11	107
West Coast	8	13	61
Venue: MCG	crowd: 98,633

In contrast to 2014, West Coast endured an underwhelming 2015 NAB Challenge campaign, with key defender Eric Mackenzie suffering a season-ending injury during the opening game against Carlton in Mandurah. The 2015 season started with two losses against the Western Bulldogs and Fremantle respectively. Predictions of the season for West Coast were poor, but a shock win over preseason premiership favorites Port Adelaide lead to a 6-game winning streak, eventually ending with a loss to North Melbourne in Hobart. Following the defeat, West Coast returned to form with another 6 game winning streak. The Eagles would end up finishing behind local rivals Fremantle in second position. West Coast had a record average winning margin of 66 points at Subiaco in 2015, with the only losses at the venue coming against Fremantle and Hawthorn. The Eagles would go on to defeat Hawthorn and North Melbourne in the qualifying and preliminary finals by 32 and 25 points respectively to qualify for the 2015 Grand Final, their first since 2006, only to lose to Hawthorn by 46 points.

The following season would end up being a disappointment, with the team failing to produce another top 4 finish in spite of a late form reversal. In their elimination final, the heavily favoured Eagles were defeated at home by the Western Bulldogs, who would go on to claim the 2016 premiership.

The Eagles' struggles for consistency exacerbated in 2017. After an impressive 6–2 start, they suffered a three-match losing streak and would not win consecutive games for the rest of the home and away season. Facing their first season out of the finals since 2014, the Eagles stunningly claimed eighth spot after defeating minor premiers (and eventual runners-up) Adelaide by 29 points in their farewell match at Subiaco Oval in Round 23. They finished only 0.5% ahead of ninth-placed Melbourne, the smallest gap between eighth and ninth in league history. The Eagles defeated Port Adelaide by two points in an epic extra-time elimination final after Luke Shuey kicked the winning goal after the siren. However, their season was ended the following week, after Greater Western Sydney belted them by 67 points in the first semi final.

2018 Grand Final	G	B	Total
West Coast	11	13	79
Collingwood	11	8	74
Venue: MCG	crowd: 100,022

Few predicted West Coast would contend in season 2018, with most having them outside the 8. After losing the inaugural game at the new Optus Stadium against the Sydney Swans, West Coast went on to consecutively win 10 to surge to top of the ladder, including defeating Hawthorn at Etihad and Richmond, the eventual minor premiers. However, injuries to star forwards Josh Kennedy and Jack Darling saw them struggle, losing consecutively 3 games including to Sydney for a second time at the SCG. However, they managed to rebound and stabilise. The Eagles' form at the MCG had long been criticised, and round 17 against an in-form Magpies who had won 7 of the previous matches was seen as a stern test. The match was fairly close throughout, until the Eagles got on top in the last quarter to win by a commanding 35 points. The victory was bittersweet, however, as the All-Australian ruckman Nick Naitanui went down with an ACL for the second time after his 2017 injury, putting him out for the rest of the season. In round 22 star midfielder Andrew Gaff was suspended for 8 weeks for a hit on Fremantle player Andrew Brayshaw. Following this many dismissed the Eagles, believing they were unable to win the flag. The following week there was a bright spot in a dark period, as Jeremy McGovern kicked a goal after the siren at Adelaide Oval to pinch the game from Port Adelaide, in a heartbreaking (for Port fans) repeat of the 2017 EF.

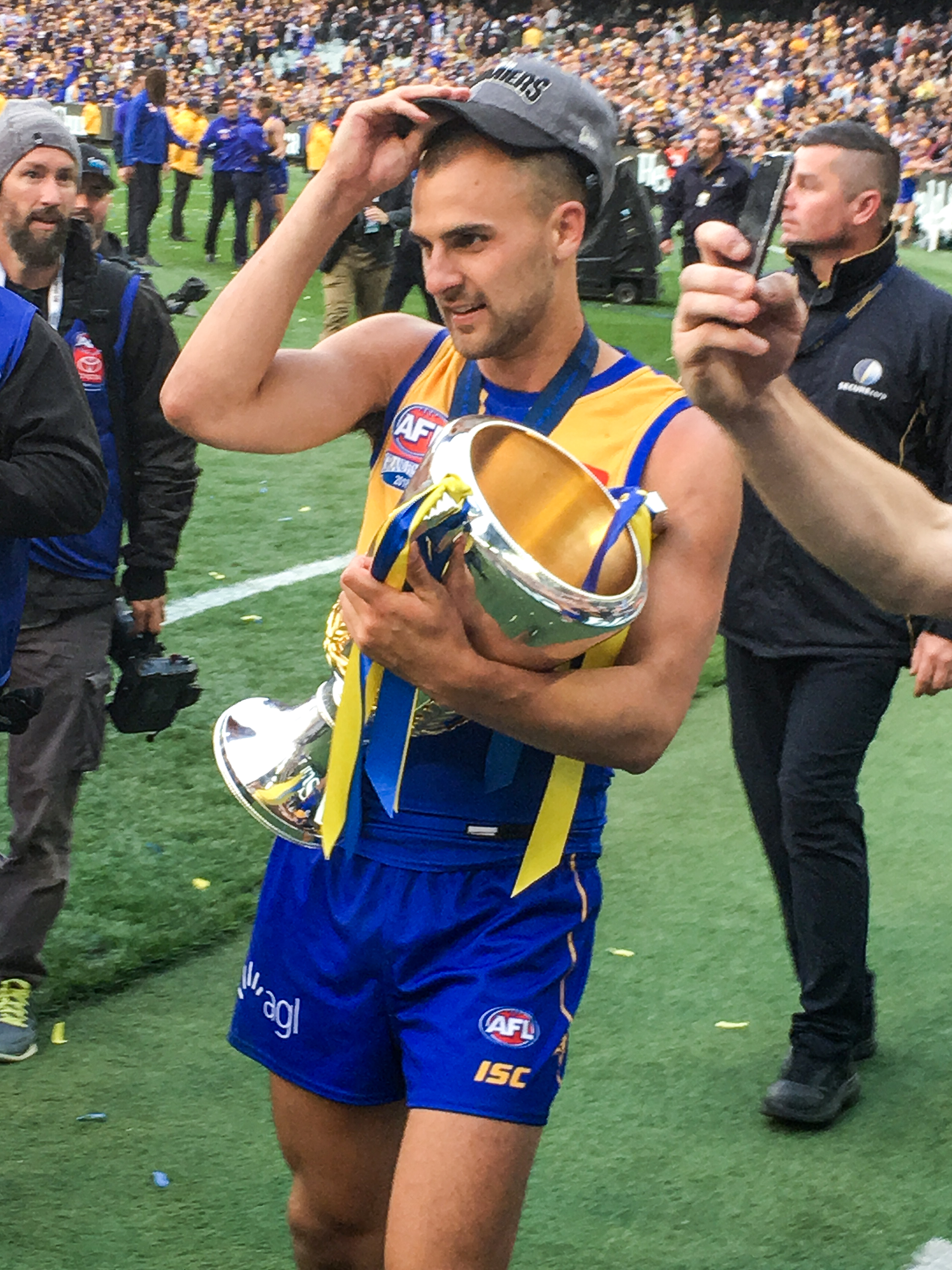
Dom Sheed after the 2018 Grand Final win with that years premiership cup.

The Eagles finished the home and away season second on the ladder with 16 wins and 6 losses, the best result since 2006. The Qualifying final would be against Collingwood (who had finished 3rd) at Optus Stadium. The Pies led for most of the close, hard-fought match, before the Eagles again pulled away in the last quarter to win by 16 points. In the preliminary final the Eagles would face the red hot Melbourne Demons, who had beaten the Eagles at home in round 22, before going on to beat GWS in round 23, and then Geelong and Hawthorn in the QF and SF. What was touted as a close-fought match became a blowout, as the Eagles savaged the hapless Dees. West Coast led 10.9 69 to 0.6 6 at half time, keeping Melbourne goalless in the first half, the first time it had happened in finals in many years. Melbourne were more competitive in the second half but it was too late, as the Eagles cruised to a huge victory, winners by 66 points, 121 to 55. In the other preliminary final, Collingwood shocked and embarrassed premiership favourites Richmond, setting up a very close grand final match-up. Though they went in slight favourites, most were expecting a close Grand Final, and in front of 100,022 at the MCG, it didn't disappoint. Collingwood led for all but 5 minutes of the match, including by 29 points in the first quarter, but the resilient Eagles managed to claw their way back into the contest, however, and with just over 2 minutes to go, a brilliant play set up by a Jeremy McGovern intercept mark and a Liam Ryan speccy, saw Dom Sheed slot a goal from a tight angle to put the Eagles 4 points in front. The Eagles went on to win 79 to 74, claiming their 4th premiership from 7 grand final appearances. Luke Shuey won the Norm Smith Medal.

Despite an average start to the 2019 season, the reigning premiers established themselves as one of the teams to beat once again, losing only twice between Round 7 and Round 21. However, the Eagles failed to obtain the double chance after losing the last two matches of the home and away season, a narrow six-point loss to fellow finalist Richmond in Round 22 and a stunning 38-point upset defeat to Hawthorn in Round 23. The reigning premiers won 15 games and qualified for the 2019 finals series in fifth position; despite a dominant 55-point win over Essendon in the first elimination final, the Eagles fell well short of 2018's glorious finish, bowing out in the second week after losing to Geelong by 20 points in the first semi-final.

The 2020 AFL season was disrupted by the COVID-19 pandemic, which necessitated a three-month suspension of the season as well as a shortened fixture and the relocation of many teams to interstate hubs. The Eagles were relocated to Queensland soon after the resumption of the season and they struggled, losing three consecutive matches early in the season. However, upon returning to Perth, they thrived, at one stage winning consecutively eight. They finished fifth on the AFL ladder once again, winning 12 matches and losing five. The Eagles were heavily favoured to beat their 2018 grand final opponents Collingwood in the elimination final, but fell to a stunning one-point defeat to the Magpies.

The 2021 season would prove to be a difficult and disappointing one for West Coast. At the end of Round 13, the Eagles were well poised with an 8–5 record after a stirring comeback victory over reigning premiers Richmond, but would proceed to win just two of their last nine matches to close out the season. The Eagles would miss the finals for just the second time in Simpson's eight-season tenure as senior coach, finishing ninth with a 10–12 win–loss record.

The 2022 season was one of the Eagles' worst, marred by injuries throughout. They finished second last, ahead of North Melbourne, with just two wins.

In Round 15 2023, the Eagles suffered their worst ever defeat, losing to Sydney by 171 points, the fourth largest margin in AFL/VFL history. The Swans became the first team to score over 200 points since Geelong in 2011 to comfortably win 31.19 205 to 5.4 34.

In 2025, former player Mitch Brown came out publicly as bisexual, becoming the AFL's first openly bisexual past or present player. Before his coming out, the AFL was the only major professional men's sport league worldwide to have never had an openly bisexual or gay past or present player.
