= Claremont Football Club =

WAFL Australian rules football club

Claremont

Names
- Full name: Claremont Football Club
- Former name(s): Cottesloe Beach Football Club (1906–21); Claremont-Cottesloe Football Club (1921–34)
- Nickname: Tigers

2024 season
- Home-and-away season: 5th (WAFL); Premiers (WAFLW)

Club details
- Founded: 1906; 120 years ago
- Colours: Navy blue, Gold
- Competition: West Australian Football League (men); WAFL Women's (women)
- President: Grant Povey
- Coach: Ashley Prescott
- Captain: Declan Mountford / Jared Hardisty
- Premierships: WAFL: 12 (1938, 1939, 1940, 1964, 1981, 1987, 1989, 1991, 1993, 1996, 2011, 2012); WAFLW: 3 (2022, 2024, 2025)
- Grounds: Claremont Showground (capacity: 10,000)
- Claremont Oval (capacity: 5,000)

Uniforms
Home	Away

Other information
- Official website: claremontfc.com.au

The Claremont Football Club, nicknamed Tigers, is an Australian rules football club based in Claremont, Western Australia, that currently plays in the West Australian Football League (WAFL) and WAFL Women's (WAFLW). The club plays its home matches at Claremont Oval since 1927. Its official colours are navy blue and gold. Formed as the "Cottesloe Beach Football Club" in 1906, the club entered the WAFL in 1925 as the "Claremont-Cottesloe Football Club"', changing its name to the present in 1935. Claremont have won 12 senior men's premierships since entering the competition, including most recently the 2011 and 2012 premierships.

== History ==
=== Foundations ===
The Claremont Football Club was formed as the amateur Cottesloe Beach Football Club in 1906, and joined the peak amateur competition, the Western Australian Football Association the following year. The club dominated the WAFA from the outset, winning premierships from 1907 to 1910, and in 1908 it beat WAFL club Subiaco in a challenge match.

Applications by the club to join the WAFL were rejected for many years. In 1919, the Cottesloe Beach club merged with a consortium from Claremont which was also attempting to gain entry to the WAFL and had no contracted players, but claimed to have secured use of the Claremont Showground as a home ground. In 1921, the club was admitted to the WAFL "B" Grade competition, as Claremont-Cottesloe, using the same blue and gold colours as the local swimming club, being finally admitted to the senior league in 1926.

The inaugural captain-coach was former South Fremantle and Richmond player Norm McIntosh, who was the only player with senior experience. McIntosh's young squad could only win one game in their first season.

=== 1927–1960 ===
In 1927, the club moved to Claremont Oval, where it has been the club's home ground, with the exception of 1945 and 1946, where, due to the grandstand burning down in 1944, and the condition of the playing surface, the club shared with Subiaco Oval with the Subiaco Football Club.

Between 1926 and 1935, Claremont won just 40 and drew 2 of 183 games for an overall success rate of 22.4%. The nearest they came to qualifying for the finals was in 1929 when, with 8 wins and 10 defeats, they finished just four points plus percentage behind 4th placed Subiaco. Even when Swan Districts was admitted to the competition in 1934, Claremont-Cottesloe continued to underachieve, ending up with the wooden spoon for the 7th time in 9 seasons.

In 1935, the club officially dropped 'Cottesloe' from its name, becoming simply 'Claremont', and with the return of George Moloney in 1936 following his five seasons with Geelong Football Club in Australian football's 'big league' the VFL Claremont enjoyed its best WANFL season to date, winning 12 and losing 8 of its home and away matches to qualify for the finals in 2nd place. A 5-point 2nd semi final defeat of minor premier East Fremantle Football Club then earned Claremont premiership favouritism, a state of affairs which intensified still further when it was learned that their grand final opponents would not be Old Easts, but the Royals (East Perth Football Club), which had finished the minor round in 4th place, but had surprisingly overturned East Fremantle in the preliminary final by a solitary point. The 1936 WANFL grand final attracted 20,874 spectators to Subiaco Oval, who witnessed East Perth reaching an 11.5 (71) to 9.6 (60) victory.

Claremont again finished runners-up a year later after raising hopes, first by finishing the home and away rounds with a 13–5–1 record to qualify for the finals as minor premiers, and then by overcoming East Fremantle in the 2nd semi final by 14 points. However, when the stakes were raised a fortnight later against the same opponent Claremont was found lacking, eventually going under by 10 points.

In 1938, the club replaced coach Dick Lawn with Johnny Leonard, a former Sandover Medallist, who had already coached successfully at Ballarat, Geelong and West Perth. The club qualified for the finals in 2nd place and scored a 2nd semi final victory over East Fremantle, winning, 17.19 (121) to 13.18 (96). The grand final, again against East Fremantle however resulted in a draw, only the second time in WA(N)FL history. In the subsequent grand final replay Claremont won by 22 points, 14.17 (111) to 11.13 (79), breaking their premiership drought. In 1939, although the club lost the 2nd semi final against East Fremantle, 15.15 to 9.14, it won the preliminary final against East Perth 10.17 (77) to 11.5 (71). In the grand final, again facing East Fremantle, Claremont went on to win 14.11 (95) to 11.10 (76) obtaining its second premiership.

1940 saw Claremont again reach the finals, losing the 2nd semi final against South Fremantle Football Club before the club prevailed against East Fremantle in the preliminary final. In the grand final Claremont went on to beat South Fremantle obtaining their third successive premiership.

Between 1942 and 1944, owing to the demands of World War II, the WANFL operated on a limited, under age only basis and after open age competition returned in 1945 Claremont commenced its longest period in the football wilderness. In 1945 it won only two games and finished last, kicked its lowest score ever against Perth, and had a losing streak of seventeen games into 1946, when it again was last with only three wins. Although it avoided the wooden spoon for the next eleven years, only in 1950 (fifth) and 1952 (fourth by one percent from East Fremantle) did it finish higher than sixth in an eight-team competition in the next seventeen years.

=== 1961–2000 ===
After claiming the wooden spoon in 1962 and 1963 Claremont appointed a complete outsider, former East Fremantle rover Jim Conway as coach for 1964. At the end of that season Claremont scraped into the finals in 4th place. The club went on to beat Subiaco in the 1st semi final, which was then followed by a win against the Demons (Perth Football Club) in the preliminary final. Claremont won 14.18 (102) to 15.8 (98) against East Fremantle in the grand final and secured the club's fourth premiership. Ian Brewer kicked two late goals to put Claremont ahead. His direct opponent was Norm Rogers, who won the Simpson medal for the game. Rogers suffered cramp in the last minutes of the game and Brewer was able to break free and score the winning goals. In those days there were no interchangeable reserves, if you went off you stayed off, so Rogers couldn't be quickly replaced.

Claremont failed to follow this meteoric rise, and between 1966 and 1978 participated in the finals only twice. In 1971 they were knocked out easily by an Alan Joyce-coached East Fremantle outfit, but in 1972 they lost only three home-and-away games and with players of the calibre of Graham Moss, Bruce Duperouzel, Colin Tully and Daryl Griffiths, were firm flag favourites, only to be beaten in both the second semi and grand finals by a more physical East Perth side. Despite recruiting Essendon Football Club full forward Geoff Blethyn, who came to Claremont in exchange for Graham Moss, the Tigers fell to last in 1973 with only four wins, and did even worse in 1975 with only three wins. The club were involved in an unusual incident in their Round 20 clash against West Perth Football Club during the 1976 season. Claremont coach Mal Brown replaced John Colreavy with Ross Ditchburn at three-quarter time, but when another player went off injured in the last quarter, Brown sent Colreavy back onto the ground, in contravention of the rule which specified that a player being replaced could not return to the field. Claremont lost the game 20.21 (141) to 13.18 (96), but had their score annulled after the game.

When Moss returned in 1977 season as captain-coach – after winning the Brownlow Medal the previous season – he formed a team in WAFL with such players as Jim and Phil Krakouer, Ken Hunter, Wayne Blackwell, John Annear, and Warren Ralph. In 1981, they broke an Australian record with 3,352 points in 21 matches and won their fifth flag over South Fremantle. Despite lacking the "enforcer" needed to win many flags under pressure, Claremont played in the finals every year bar 1985 and 1992. Under Gerard Neesham's extremely innovative coaching methods and "chip and draw" style, they won twenty and drew one of their last 21 games in 1987. Neesham's skill was such that Claremont reached five successive grand finals for three flags despite the loss of most key players to the VFL (later AFL).

=== 2000–present ===
After 1994, Claremont's fortunes declined somewhat, and financial difficulties threatened their existence in the middle 1990s. However, at WAFL level they managed to remain competitive throughout the 1990s and 2000s if never threatening for a premiership until 2004, when they were thrashed by Subiaco in the grand final, a fate which befell Claremont again in 2005 from South Fremantle.

Claremont ended the 2007 season strongly, claiming the minor premiership, but lost to Subiaco in the WAFL Grand Final on 23 September 2007. Coach Ashley Prescott left the club at the end of the season to take up an assistant coaching role with Essendon. Prescott's replacement was former assistant coach, Roger Kerr (former East Fremantle player and father of West Coast Eagles player, Daniel Kerr), who was given a two-year contract. Claremont also won the 2007 Rodriquez Shield (the team which has the best League, Reserves and Colts record combined).

Claremont's 2008 campaign kicked off on 22 March against West Perth at Claremont Oval, which Claremont won by 14 points. It was Roger Kerr's first game in charge of the club. He took the reins of the club, following the loss of experienced players such as Daniel Bandy (retired), Rowan Jones (retired), Luke Toia (retired), as well as Mitch Morton (Richmond) and Cale Morton (Melbourne). Other losses include Luke Dwyer (retired), Darren Harper (retired), Aaron Jarvis (retired), Trent Martin (East Perth), Tim Nelli (East Fremantle), Tom Matson (overseas) and Rory Walton (overseas). The Tigers' only gain this year was former Brisbane Lions midfielder Marcus Allan. The Tigers finished the season second last, saving themselves from the wooden spoon with a victory on the last day of the competition.

Claremont lost their first match of 2009 and things were starting to look a bit wobbly after they lost their second match. The losing streak continued, during which they lost nine games in a row. At the end of April the club decided to cut short Kerr's two-year coaching contract. Claremont appointed Simon McPhee as a caretaker coach, becoming the club's 30th league coach. McPhee had been the coach of Claremont's Colts team for the last three seasons. Under the new coach the Tigers started to win a couple of games. They finished in eighth place on the ladder, with seven wins from twenty matches. The Claremont Colts side showed a great future for the league side, by defeating Peel Thunder in the Colts Grand Final, by over 8 goals. Another positive was that Chad Jones won the Bernie Naylor Medal, kicking 77 goals.

==== Foxtel Cup (2011-12) ====
Claremont reached the final of the 2011 Foxtel Cup, losing out 59 to 38 against VFL club Williamstown at Subiaco.

Once again in 2012 Claremont made the final, this time playing another VFL club Werribee, with the match again played at Subiaco. Claremont won the final with a score of 99 to 55, with Thomas Lee being awarded the Coles Medal for his best on ground performance.

Claremont claimed the minor premiership in 2010. They also reached the Grand Final against Swan Districts. The Reserves also claimed the minor premiership and set up a grand final matchup with East Perth. Claremont finished the home and away season with two losses and one draw (a loss and a draw to the eventual Premiers Swan Districts and the final round defeat by East Perth). In the 2nd Semi Final, Claremont defeated Swans at Claremont Oval by 50 points (17.17 (119) to 10.9 (69)), with former Fremantle Dockers player Andrew Foster kicking 5 goals. Swan Districts then beat East Perth in the Preliminary Final. The Grand Final match swung from one side to the other for the entire day. A pack mark by David Crawford deep into time-on was converted and seemed to give Claremont the flag for the first time in 14 years, but as the match wore on into the 32nd minute of the final quarter, Sandover Medallist Andrew Krakouer popped up to put Swans back in front. The Swans won the match (14.16 (100) to 14.15 (99)). Key match-ups included Krakouer's dominance and the move of Simon Starling to the forward line where he was virtually ineffective. The Reserves won the Reserve grade Grand Final over East Perth (13.6 (84) to 10.12 (72)). Midfielder Luke Blackwell won the EB Cook Medal as the Best & Fairest player for the Tigers in 2010; Blackwell also finished as runner-up to Andrew Krakouer in the Sandover Medal count.

The club were once again the dominant side in the competition completing the season at the top of the league ladder winning 14 from 19 games and this time were successful in claiming the premiership. In the Grand Final Claremont defeated Subiaco by 56 points, 19.13 (127) to 10.11 (71), with Beau Wilkes of Claremont winning the Simpson Medal as best on ground. The 2011 Sandover Medal was won by Luke Blackwell. Club Captain, Clancy Rudeforth, announced his retirement from league football following the Grand Final victory.

Claremont were a foundation team in the WAFL Women's competition starting in 2019.

== Current playing list ==
Claremont Football Club
Senior list			Coaching staff
1 Jack Lewsey; 2 Francis Watson; 3 Bailey Rogers; 4 Anthony Treacy; 5 Declan Mountford (c); 6 Teia Miles; 7 Ronin O'Connor; 9 Ben Edwards; 10 Lachie Martinis; 11 Jye Bolton; 12 Morgan Davies; 14 Samuel Alvarez; 15 Timm House; 16 Jack Buller; 17 Callan England; 18 Anthony Davis; 19 Talon Delacey; 20 Bailey Bennett; 21 Oliver Eastland; 22 Ben Elliott	23 Jason Carter; 25 Oliver Sheldrick; 26 Steven Miller; 27 Alex Manuel; 28 Louis Passera; 29 Coen Jackman; 31 Tyron Smallwood; 32 Max Minear; 33 Zac Mainwaring; 34 Joel Western; 35 Declan Hardisty; 36 Logan Guelfi; 37 Max Mumme; 38 Charlie Malone; 39 Benjamin Clarke; 40 Rhori Williams-Jolley; 41 Kendyll Blurton; 42 Dylan Mulligan; 43 Sam Gilbey; 43 Felix Rogers; 45 Finn Moloney	46 George Graham; 47 Louis Wilson; 48 Josh Sukuroski; 49 Corey Mitchell; 51 Rohan MacNeill; 51 William Reilly; 52 Jake WIlson; 53 Mitchell Barron; 54 Campbell Rogers; 55 Sean Williams; 56 Heath Ravenhill; 61 Josh Ledger; 62 Jack Burton; 63 Menno Inverarity; 64 Julian Maceri; 65 Ted Barrass; 66 Kostya Daylight; 70 Henry Kemp; ?? Max Spyvee; ?? Dylan Smallwood	Head coach: Ashley Prescott; Assistant coaches: Tony Walters; Ben Dyer; Glenn McCallum; Mark McGough; Legend: (c) Captain(s); (vc) Vice-captain(s); Updated: 16 May 2023; Source(s): ,

== Club song ==
Oh, We're From Tigerland is the official club song of the Claremont Football Club and is sung to the tune of "Row, Row, Row from Ziegfeld Follies". It was taken from the Richmond Football Club song, with an alteration to the second last line.

Oh! We're from Tigerland
A fighting fury, we're from Tigerland
In any weather you will see us with a grin
Risking head and shin
If we're behind then never mind
We'll fight and fight and win

For we're from Tigerland
We never weaken 'til the final siren's gone
Like the Tigers of old, we're strong and we're bold
For we're the Tigers, the old gold and blue
We're from Tigerland

== Honours ==
=== Club honours ===
Premierships
Competition	Level	Wins	Years won
West Australian Football League	Men's Seniors	12	1938, 1939, 1940, 1964, 1981, 1987, 1989, 1991, 1993, 1996, 2011, 2012
West Australian Football League	Women's Seniors	3	2022, 2024, 2025
West Australian Football League	Men's Reserves	11	1937, 1977, 1980, 1982, 1987, 1990, 2000, 2010, 2011, 2012, 2016
West Australian Football League	Women's Reserves (2019–2022)	3	2019, 2020, 2022
West Australian Football League	Colts (Boys U19)	19	1976, 1977, 1978, 1979, 1986, 1988, 1993, 1994, 1995, 1996, 1997, 2009, 2012, 2015, 2016, 2019, 2023, 2024, 2025
West Australian Football League	Fourths (1965–1974)	2	1966, 1968
Other titles and honours
Rodriguez Shield	Multiple	17	1972, 1979, 1981, 1982, 1987, 1988, 1989, 1990, 1991, 1993, 1994, 2007, 2010, 2011, 2012, 2020, 2026
Foxtel Cup	Seniors	1	2013
Finishing positions
West Australian Football League	Minor premiership (men's seniors)	19	1937, 1939, 1940, 1972, 1979, 1981, 1982, 1987, 1988, 1989, 1990, 1991, 1994, 2001, 2007, 2010, 2011, 2012, 2013
West Australian Football League	Runners Up (men's seniors)	16	1936, 1937 1942, 1972, 1982, 1983, 1988, 1990, 1994, 2004, 2005, 2007, 2010, 2020, 2022, 2026
West Australian Football League	Wooden spoons (men's seniors)	14	1926, 1927, 1928, 1931, 1932, 1933, 1934, 1945, 1946, 1958, 1962, 1963, 1973, 1975
West Australian Football League	Minor premiership (women's seniors)	3	2023, 2024, 2025

=== Individual honours ===
Sandover Medalists: 1932: Keith Hough, 1933–34: Sammy Clarke, 1936: George Moloney, 1949: Gordon Maffina, 1967: John Parkinson, 1984: Michael Mitchell/Steve Malaxos, 2005: Jaxon Crabb, 2007: Anthony Jones, 2011: Luke Blackwell, 2012: Kane Mitchell, 2016: Jye Bolton, 2018: Jye Bolton, 2021: Bailey Rogers

Bernie Naylor Medalists: 1940: George Moloney (129), 1943: Robin Farmer (97), 1976: Norm Uncle (91), 1981: Warren Ralph (127), 1982: Warren Ralph (115), 1983: Warren Ralph (128), 1991: John Hutton (100), 2001: Paul Medhurst (78), 2009: Chad Jones (77), 2010: Chad Jones (85)

All Australians: 1966 & 1969: John McIntosh, 1979 & 1980: Ken Hunter, 1986: Steve Malaxos, 1985 & 1986: Michael Mitchell

Tassie Medallists: (1 total) 1947: Les McClements

== Records ==
Highest Score: Round 17, 1981 – 39.20 (254) vs. Perth at Claremont Oval

Lowest Score: Round 15, 1945 – 1.3 (9) vs. Perth at WACA

Greatest Winning Margin: Round 10, 2010 – 194 points vs. Peel at Claremont Oval

Greatest Losing Margin: Round 10, 1958 – 147 points vs. East Perth at Perth Oval

Most Games: Darrell Panizza 274 (1979–1995)

Record Home Attendance: Round 7, 1983 – 18,268 vs. South Fremantle.

Record Finals Attendance: 1982 Grand Final – 50,883 vs. Swan Districts at Subiaco Oval

AFL Draftees: 64 (not including rookies)

== AFL/VFL players (including Rookies) ==
There is a list of past and present Claremont players who have played at AFL/VFL:

- Michael Aitken (Carlton)
- Ben Allan (Hawthorn, Fremantle)
- Marcus Allan (Brisbane Lions)
- John Annear (Collingwood, Richmond, West Coast Eagles)
- David Antonowicz (West Coast Eagles)
- Gary Arnold (Richmond)
- Daniel Bandy (Fremantle, Western Bulldogs)
- Tom Barrass (West Coast Eagles, Hawthorn)
- Barry Beecroft (South Melbourne/Sydney Swans)
- Tony Beers (Collingwood)
- Tony Begovich (West Coast Eagles, Sydney Swans)
- Laurie Bellotti (West Coast Eagles)
- Scott Bennett (West Coast Eagles)
- Brendon Bermingham (1914–1975) (St. Kilda)
- Gerald Betts (Richmond, Collingwood)
- Tony Bizzaca (1921–2006) (Melbourne)
- Luke Blackwell (Carlton)
- Wayne Blackwell (Carlton)
- Geoff Blethyn (Essendon)
- Ryan Brabazon (Sydney Swans)
- Kepler Bradley (Essendon, Fremantle)
- Mark Brayshaw (North Melbourne)
- Ian Brewer (1936–2010) (Collingwood)
- Mal Brown (Richmond)
- Andrew Browne (Fremantle)
- Arnold Byfield (1923–2015) (Melbourne)
- Mark Carlon (St. Kilda)
- Nathan Carroll (Melbourne)
- Trent Carroll (Fremantle, West Coast Eagles)
- Scott Chisholm (Fremantle, Melbourne)
- Travis Colyer (Essendon)
- Jack Compton (1918–1983) (Melbourne)
- Ron Cooper (1911–1991) (Carlton, North Melbourne)
- Jaxon Crabb (West Coast Eagles, Port Adelaide)
- Ben Cunningham (Fremantle)
- Allen Daniels (Footscray)
- Peter Davidson (West Coast Eagles, Brisbane Bears)
- Jim Davies (1926–2010) (Carlton)
- Matt de Boer (Fremantle, GWS)
- Tony Delaney (Essendon, Fremantle, St. Kilda)
- Tom Derickx (Richmond, Sydney Swans)
- Renato Dintinosante (Richmond)
- Ross Ditchburn (Carlton)
- Brad Dodd (Fremantle)
- Bruce Duperouzel (St. Kilda, Footscray)
- Scott Edwards (Fremantle)
- Andrew Embley (West Coast Eagles)
- Michael Evans (Melbourne)
- Tony Evans (West Coast Eagles)
- Neil Ferguson (Hawthorn)
- Chad Fletcher (West Coast Eagles)
- Andrew Foster (Fremantle)
- Nat Fyfe (Fremantle)
- Mark Gale (Fremantle, St. Kilda)
- Michael Gardiner (West Coast Eagles, St. Kilda)
- Phil Gilbert (Melbourne, Fremantle)
- Steve Goulding (North Melbourne)
- Bob Greenwood (Essendon)
- Daryl Griffiths (St. Kilda)
- Jeremy Guard (Fitzroy)
- Joel Hamling (Western Bulldogs, Fremantle, Sydney)
- Greg Harding (Fremantle, West Coast Eagles)
- Mark Hepburn (North Melbourne, West Coast Eagles, Sydney Swans)
- Peter Higgins (West Coast Eagles)
- Peter Hines (Footscray)
- Geoff Hocking (Carlton)
- Jesse Hogan (Melbourne, Fremantle, GWS)
- Todd Holmes (West Coast Eagles)
- Ken Hunter (Carlton)
- Kingsley Hunter (Fremantle, Western Bulldogs, Hawthorn)
- John Hutton (Brisbane Bears, Sydney Swans, Fremantle)
- John Hyde (Geelong)
- Ryan Jackson (Carlton)
- Anthony Jones (Fremantle)
- Brett Jones (West Coast Eagles)
- Chad Jones (North Melbourne, West Coast Eagles)
- Rowan Jones (West Coast Eagles)
- Dale Kickett (Fitzroy, West Coast Eagles, St. Kilda, Essendon, Fremantle)
- Derek Kickett (North Melbourne, Essendon, Sydney Swans)
- Darren Kowal (Melbourne)
- Jim Krakouer (North Melbourne, St. Kilda)
- Nathan Krakouer (Port Adelaide, Gold Coast)
- Phil Krakouer (North Melbourne, Footscray)
- Quenton Leach (Fremantle)
- Tom Ledger (St. Kilda)
- Tom Lee (St. Kilda)
- Chris Lewis (West Coast Eagles)
- John Lewis (Hawthorn)
- Angus Litherland (Hawthorn)
- Eric Mackenzie (West Coast Eagles)
- Beau Maister (West Coast Eagles, St. Kilda)
- Steve Malaxos (Hawthorn, West Coast Eagles)
- Ken Mann (St. Kilda)
- Peter Mann (North Melbourne, Fremantle)
- Denis Marshall (Geelong)
- Neil Marshall (West Coast Eagles)
- Jack Martin (Gold Coast, Carlton)
- Gilbert McAdam (St. Kilda, Brisbane Bears)
- Shane McAdam (Adelaide)
- Jerry McAuliffe (1910–1959) (Hawthorn)
- Patrick McGinnity (West Coast Eagles)
- Andrew McGovern (Sydney Swans, Fremantle)
- Jeremy McGovern (West Coast Eagles)
- Mitch McGovern (Adelaide, Carlton)
- Ashley McIntosh (West Coast Eagles)
- John McIntosh (St. Kilda)
- Norm McIntosh (1890–1965) (Richmond)
- Guy McKenna (West Coast Eagles)
- Leo McPartland (1920–1994) (Collingwood)
- Paul Medhurst (Fremantle, Collingwood)
- Peter Melesso (South Melbourne, St. Kilda, West Coast Eagles)
- Jamie Merillo (Fremantle)
- Barry Metcalfe (1935–1980) (Hawthorn)
- Geoff Miles (Collingwood, West Coast Eagles, Geelong)
- Gavin Mitchell (Fremantle, St. Kilda)
- Kane Mitchell (Port Adelaide)
- Michael Mitchell (Richmond)
- Tom Mitchell (Hawthorn)
- George Moloney (1909–1983) (Geelong)
- Bruce Monteath (Richmond)
- Cale Morton (Melbourne, West Coast Eagles)
- Jarryd Morton (Hawthorn)
- Mitch Morton (West Coast Eagles, Richmond, Sydney Swans)
- Graham Moss (Essendon)
- David Muir (Fremantle)
- Jeff Murray (Hawthorn)
- Ryan Neates (West Coast Eagles)
- Gerard Neesham (Sydney Swans)
- Alistair Nicholson (Melbourne)
- Jason Norrish (Melbourne, Fremantle)
- Rod Oborne (Collingwood, Richmond)
- David O'Connell (West Coast Eagles, Fitzroy)
- John O'Connell (Geelong)
- Michael O'Connell (West Coast Eagles)
- John Parkinson (Collingwood)
- Charlie Parsons (1903–1965) (Carlton)
- Carl Peterson (Hawthorn)
- Sam Petrevski-Seton (Carlton, West Coast Eagles)
- Peter Pianto (1929–2008) (Geelong)
- Ashley Prescott (Richmond, Fremantle)
- Don Pyke (West Coast Eagles)
- Warren Ralph (Carlton)
- Jim Reid (1913–1983) (South Melbourne)
- Russell Reynolds (St. Kilda)
- Todd Ridley (Essendon, Fremantle, Hawthorn)
- Byron Schammer (Fremantle)
- Gary Shaw (Collingwood, Brisbane Bears)
- Casey Sibosado (Fremantle)
- Alex Silvagni (Fremantle, Carlton)
- Brad Smith (Collingwood)
- Daniel Southern (Footscray/Western Bulldogs)
- Peter Spencer (North Melbourne)
- Lewis Stevenson (West Coast Eagles, Port Adelaide)
- Nick Stone (West Coast Eagles)
- Nick Suban (Fremantle)
- Tom Swift (West Coast Eagles)
- Peter Thorne (Melbourne)
- Luke Toia (Fremantle)
- Colin Tully (Collingwood)
- Ryan Turnbull (West Coast Eagles)
- Cameron Venables (Collingwood)
- Tristen Walker (Collingwood)
- Leigh Wardell-Johnson (Fremantle)
- Michael Warren (Fremantle)
- Clive Waterhouse (Fremantle)
- Beau Waters (West Coast Eagles)
- Gerrick Weedon (West Coast Eagles)
- Andrew Williams (West Coast Eagles, Collingwood)
- Marley Williams (Collingwood, North Melbourne)
- Nicholas Winmar (St. Kilda)
- Brad Wira (Fremantle, Western Bulldogs)
- Clinton Wolf (Fremantle)
- Josh Wooden (West Coast Eagles)
- Kevin Worthington (Collingwood)
- Syd Young (1918–2013) (South Melbourne)

== See also ==
- Category:Claremont Football Club players
