= Ashley Prescott =

Australian rules footballer and coach

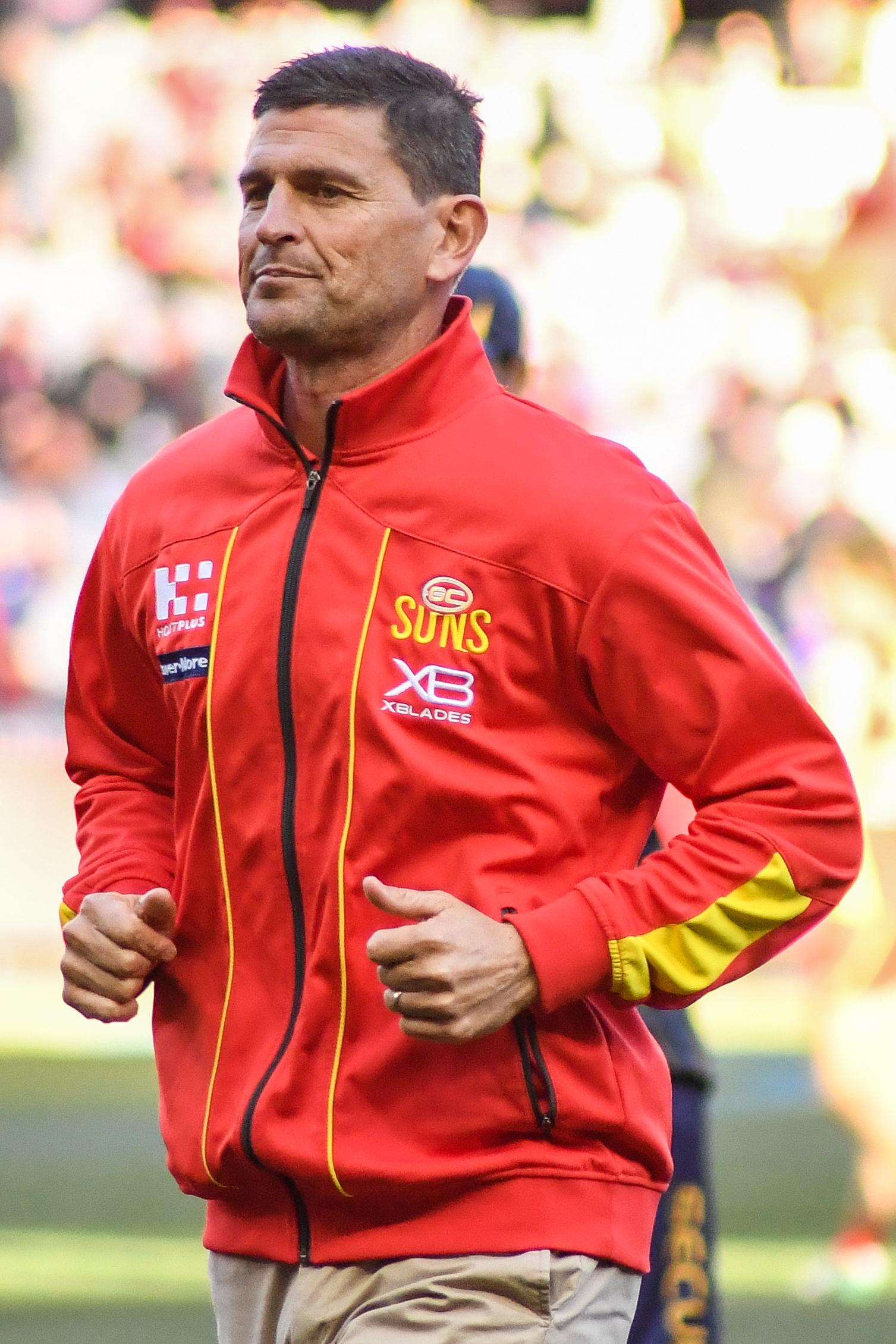
- Prescott with Gold Coast in August 2018

Personal information
- Born: 11 September 1972 (age 54)
- Original team: Mt Waverley
- Height: 188 cm (6 ft 2 in)
- Weight: 88 kg (194 lb)

Playing career^{1}
Years	Club	Games (Goals)
1993–1998	Richmond	90 (15)
1999–2001	Fremantle	40 (5)
Total		130 (20)

Coaching career
Years	Club	Games (W–L–D)
(2004–2007) 2020	Claremont	152
2007	WAFL	1 (0–1–0)
- ^{1} Playing statistics correct to the end of 2001.

Ashley Prescott (born 11 September 1972) is a former Australian rules footballer. He played with the Richmond and Fremantle Football Clubs in the Australian Football League (AFL) between 1993 and 2001, he was senior coach of the Claremont Football Club in the West Australian Football League (WAFL) from 2004 to 2007 and is currently the senior coach with the Claremont football club in the (WAFL).

Prescott made his debut in 1993 for Richmond, being recruited from Mount Waverley. He struggled to cement a place in the side, only playing 12 games in his first two seasons, but in 1995 he found his spot in the side as a midfield tagger, playing 21 games. He then played every game of the 1996 season until he broke his collarbone in round 16, which sidelined him for the remainder of the year. After returning to the Richmond side in round 3 of the 1997 he played in 41 of Richmonds next 42 games, but at the end of the 1998 season he did not renew his contract and entered the pre-season draft.

He was selected by Fremantle with the second selection in the 1999 pre-season draft. His first year with the Dockers saw him place eighth in the 1999 best and fairest and his leadership and experience at the still-young club saw him awarded the best clubman. Hamstring injuries however restricted him to 17 games over the next two seasons and he announced his retirement from AFL football at the end of the 2001 season. Then playing a combined 30 league games for south Fremantle and Claremont in the (WAFL)

He had ambitions to become a league coach and was the Claremont Colts coach in 2002, before returning to WAFL football in 2003 with Claremont, switching from South Fremantle who he had represented in 2000 and 2001 whilst at Fremantle. He then retired from league football at the end of 2003 and was appointed league coach for the 2004 season. He has taken the Tigers to the grand final in 2004, 2005, 2007 , 2022 and 2026 but was unsuccessful each time. He was appointed the coach of the Western Australian state team in 2007. He was also Head of Football operations at Clontarf Football Academy. In October 2007 he was announced as an assistant coach to former Richmond teammate and new Essendon coach Matthew Knights. from 2008 to 2011. Prescott then went to Fremantle as an assistant coach from 2011 to 2014 and then to the Gold Coast suns from 2014 to 2020 again coaching as an assistant. He is also the first (WAFL) coach to have completed an (AFL) level 4 coaching degree. He has been involved with 4 AFL clubs and two WAFL clubs both in his playing and coaching career.

He is the son of David Prescott, who played 13 games for St Kilda in the early 1960s.
