= Jack Compton (disambiguation) =

Jack Compton (born 1988) is an English footballer.

Jack Compton may also refer to:

- Jack Compton (baseball) (1882–1974)
- Jack Compton (Australian footballer) (1918–?)

== See also ==
- John Compton (disambiguation)
