= Peter Hynes =

Peter Hynes may refer to:

- Peter Hynes (footballer) (born 1983), Irish footballer
- Peter Hynes (rugby union) (born 1982), Australian rugby union player

== See also ==
- Peter Hines (born 1948), Australian rules footballer
- Peter F. Hines (1927–1984), American attorney and politician
