= Anthony Jones (Australian rules footballer) =

Australian rules footballer

Personal information
- Full name: Anthony Jones
- Born: 19 December 1974 (age 51); Perth
- Original team: Osborne Park JFC
- Height: 188 cm (6 ft 2 in)
- Weight: 86 kg (190 lb)
- Positions: Centre half-forward, centre half-back

Playing career^{1}
Years	Club	Games (Goals)
1995–2003	Fremantle	82 (3)
1994–95; 1997–98; 2000; 2002–08	Claremont	147 (280)
1999	South Fremantle	1 (0)

Representative team honours
Years	Team	Games (Goals)
1994; 1997; 2005–07	WAFL	5 (6)
1996	Western Australia	1 (0)
- ^{1} Playing statistics correct to the end of Round 23, 2008.

Career highlights
- WAFL representative team 1994, 1997, 2005, 2006, 2007; Western Australia State of Origin representative 1996; Claremont leading goalkicker 2004, 2005, 2006, 2007; WAFL representative captain 2006; Claremont captain 2007–08; Sandover Medal 2007

Anthony Jones (born 19 December 1974) is a former Australian rules footballer. He was the winner of the 2007 Sandover Medal.

== Fremantle career ==
Jones played only 82 games over nine AFL seasons, missing many games to injuries to his knee, foot, hamstring, rib and shoulder as well as a punctured lung. A stress fracture of the right foot resulted in him being sidelined for the entire 1999 season and in an unusual injury for a footballer, a ruptured tendon in his chest caused him to miss the second half of the 2002 season.

== Claremont career ==
After being delisted by Fremantle at the end of the 2003 season, Jones continued to play for Claremont where he has switched to the forward line with great success. He has finished in the top 4 of the Claremont Best and Fairest award in each year since then and in 2006 was named the captain of the state team that played South Australia.

In 2007, he became the oldest person to ever win the Sandover Medal, narrowly beating Subiaco's Brad Smith.

He has played 126 games for Claremont and skippered the club in 2008.
