= Russell Reynolds =

Australian rules footballer

Personal information
- Full name: Russell Reynolds
- Born: 4 February 1951 (age 75)
- Original team: Claremont
- Height: 182 cm (6 ft 0 in)
- Weight: 86 kg (190 lb)
- Position: Utility

Playing career^{1}
Years	Club	Games (Goals)
1969–73	Claremont	78 (29)
1973–76	St Kilda	68 (30)
- ^{1} Playing statistics correct to the end of 1976.

Russell Reynolds (born 4 February 1951) is a former Australian rules footballer who played with Claremont in the West Australian Football League (WAFL) and St Kilda in the Victorian Football League (VFL).
