= Renato Dintinosante =

Australian rules footballer

Personal information
- Full name: Renato Dintinosante
- Born: 24 May 1963 (age 63)
- Original teams: Claremont, (WAFL)

Playing career^{1}
| Years | Club | Games (Goals) |
| 1987 | Richmond | 2 (0) |
- ^{1} Playing statistics correct to the end of 1987.

Renato Dintinosante (born 24 May 1963) is a former Australian rules footballer who played for Richmond in the Victorian Football League (VFL) in 1987. Originally from Preston, Victoria, he played for the Fitzroy reserves, before moving to Western Australia to play for the Claremont Football Club in the West Australian Football League (WAFL). He was then recruited by Richmond in 1987 where he played in the final two games of the season.
