= Tony Bizzaca =

Australian rules footballer

Personal information
- Full name: Anthony Joseph Bizzaca
- Born: 16 May 1921; Boulder, Western Australia
- Died: 12 August 2006 (aged 85); Perth, Western Australia
- Original team: Claremont
- Height: 178 cm (5 ft 10 in)
- Weight: 70 kg (154 lb)

Playing career^{1}
Years	Club	Games (Goals)
1944	Melbourne	2 (0)
- ^{1} Playing statistics correct to the end of 1944.

Anthony Joseph Bizzaca (16 May 1921 – 12 August 2006) was an Australian rules footballer who played with Melbourne in the Victorian Football League (VFL).
