= John Compton (disambiguation) =

John Compton was a St. Lucian politician.

John Compton may also refer to:

- John Compton (footballer) (born 1937), English footballer
- John Compton (organ builder) (1876–1957), pipe organ builder
- John Compton (actor) (1923–2015), American actor
- John Joseph Compton (1929–2014), American philosopher
- John Compton (MP) for Gloucester
- John Compton (comics), comic book artist/writer, see Hank Chapman

== See also ==
- Jack Compton (disambiguation)
