= Chad Fletcher =

Australian rules footballer (born 1979)

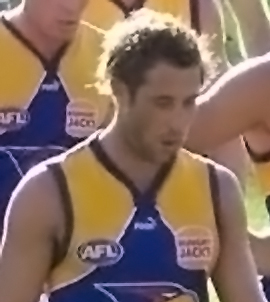

Personal information
- Full name: Chad Douglas Fletcher
- Born: 30 August 1979 (age 47)
- Height: 179 cm (5 ft 10 in)
- Weight: 81 kg (179 lb)
- Position: Midfielder

Playing career^{1}
Years	Club	Games (Goals)
1999–2009	West Coast	179 (74)

International team honours
Years	Team	Games (Goals)
2003	Australia	2 (0)
- ^{1} Playing statistics correct to the end of 2009.

Career highlights
- Ross Glendinning Medal 2002, 2004; All-Australian team 2004; West Coast premiership side 2006

Chad Douglas Fletcher (born 30 August 1979) is a former Australian rules footballer who played for the West Coast Eagles in the Australian Football League (AFL). He also played for the Subiaco Football Club and the Claremont Football Club in the West Australian Football League (WAFL). From Perth, Western Australia, Fletcher was recruited by West Coast in the 1998 Rookie Draft, and made his debut for the club in 1999. Having represented Australia in the 2003 International Rules Series against Ireland, he was subsequently named in the All-Australian team in 2004. Fletcher played in West Coast's 2006 premiership victory over Sydney, and retired at the end of the 2009 season after a total of 179 games for the club.

== Football career ==
=== Early career ===
Fletcher began his professional football career in the West Australian Football League with Subiaco, and was elevated from the West Coast rookie list in 1998. He made his AFL debut in 1999, but did not make his mark on the league until 2002.

=== Career rise ===
Fletcher was 4th in the West Coast Best & Fairest voting in 2002 before he improved to 3rd in 2003 and 2nd in 2004. In 2003, Fletcher was selected to play for Australia in the International Rules series against Ireland, and in 2004 he was named to the interchange bench of his first All-Australian team.

Fletcher was known as one of the most prolific ball winners in the AFL, and played in the West Coast midfield with Daniel Kerr. Chad Fletcher was sometimes forgotten in West Coast's midfield but did show he was very skillful.

Fletcher is also remembered for running into a fence while practicing a training drill blindfolded in 2005, an initiative by coach John Worsfold. He was not injured.

=== 2006 season ===
Fletcher was also known as a "prolific" ball winner who could accumulate many possessions in a game. However 2006 saw him considered one of the least accurate kicks in the league, costing the Eagles many turnovers. He was ranked 1st in clangers per game at West Coast in 2006.

=== Retirement from AFL ===
Fletcher was told that he was not needed in 2010 and beyond, playing his last AFL game in round 22, 2009 against Richmond.

Fletcher spent the 2010 season playing for the Balmain Dockers in the Sydney Football League, but retired after the Dockers did not make finals.

== Personal life ==
During West Coast's 2006 end of year holiday in Las Vegas, Fletcher had overdosed on drugs and had a brush with death after reportedly choking on his own vomit. Fletcher was rushed to hospital and had to be revived after he stopped breathing. His case was so serious he spent four days in a hospital and flew straight back to Perth after checking out.

In August 2010, Fletcher was arrested and later pleaded guilty to possession of cocaine, outside the Kings Cross nightclub Hugo's. Fletcher escaped conviction and was placed on a nine-month good behaviour bond.

In 2014, Fletcher lost his license and was fined $1600 for drink-driving. He was recorded as having a .08 blood alcohol level at the time.

== Statistics ==
Legend
G	Goals	K	Kicks	D	Disposals	T	Tackles
B	Behinds	H	Handballs	M	Marks

Season	Team	No.	Games	Totals							Averages (per game)						
Season	Team	No.	Games	G	B	K	H	D	M	T	G	B	K	H	D	M	T
1999	West Coast	41	1	0	0	1	1	2	1	0	0.0	0.0	1.0	1.0	2.0	1.0	0.0
2000	West Coast	41	17	11	6	181	90	271	48	23	0.6	0.4	10.6	5.3	15.9	2.8	1.4
2001	West Coast	7	20	8	7	253	126	379	81	45	0.4	0.4	12.7	6.3	19.0	4.1	2.3
2002	West Coast	7	18	10	4	212	125	337	72	49	0.6	0.2	11.8	6.9	18.7	4.0	2.7
2003	West Coast	7	20	10	9	290	163	453	71	61	0.5	0.5	14.5	8.2	22.7	3.6	3.1
2004	West Coast	7	22	7	13	277	281	558	98	70	0.3	0.6	12.6	12.8	25.4	4.5	3.2
2005	West Coast	7	25	17	13	355	234	589	133	46	0.7	0.5	14.2	9.4	23.6	5.3	1.8
2006	West Coast	7	24	5	12	308	235	543	116	59	0.2	0.5	12.8	9.8	22.6	4.8	2.5
2007	West Coast	7	10	3	1	129	106	235	52	33	0.3	0.1	12.9	10.6	23.5	5.2	3.3
2008	West Coast	7	17	3	1	176	213	389	77	39	0.2	0.1	10.4	12.5	22.9	4.5	2.3
2009	West Coast	7	5	0	2	56	60	116	30	7	0.0	0.4	11.2	12.0	23.2	6.0	1.4
Career			179	74	68	2238	1634	3872	779	432	0.4	0.4	12.5	9.1	21.6	4.4	2.4
