= Ken Mann (footballer) =

Australian rules footballer

Personal information
- Full name: Ken Mann
- Born: 31 March 1941 (age 85)
- Original team: Claremont (WAFL)
- Height: 175 cm (5 ft 9 in)
- Weight: 76 kg (168 lb)
- Position: Wing

Playing career^{1}
Years	Club	Games (Goals)
1965–66	St Kilda	13 (1)
- ^{1} Playing statistics correct to the end of 1966.

Ken Mann (born 31 March 1941) is a former Australian rules footballer who played with St Kilda in the Victorian Football League (VFL).
