= Norm McIntosh =

Australian rules footballer

Norman McIntosh

Personal information
- Born: 3 March 1890
- Died: 11 March 1965 (aged 75); Cottesloe, Western Australia
- Original team: Cottesloe/South Fremantle (WAFL)
- Height: 6 ft 0 in (183 cm)
- Weight: 12 st 9 lb (80.5 kg)
- Positions: centreman, half-back flank

Playing career^{1}
Years	Club	Games (Goals)
1910–1919	South Fremantle	130 (10)
1920–1924	Richmond	78 (3)
1925	Rupanyup	? (?)
1926–1927	Claremont-Cottesloe	26 (4)
Total		234 (17)

Coaching career
Years	Club	Games (W–L–D)
1926–1927	Claremont-Cottesloe	34 (2–32–0)
1929, 1933	South Fremantle	38 (19–19–0)
Total		72 (21–51–0)
- ^{1} Playing statistics correct to the end of 1927.

Career highlights
- Richmond Premiership Player 1921; Interstate games:- 4

Norman 'Snowy' McIntosh (3 March 1890 – 11 March 1965) was an Australian rules footballer who played in the VFL between 1920 and 1924 for the Richmond Football Club.

Recruited from South Fremantle, where he had played for ten seasons including the 1916 and 1917 premiership teams, McIntosh was Richmond's first major recruit from Western Australia.

After leaving the Tigers he was captain/coach of Rupanyup in rural Victoria for one season before returning to Western Australia where he was captain/coach of Claremont-Cottesloe in their first two seasons of 1926 and 1927, and non-playing coach of his old club South Fremantle in 1929 and again in 1933.
