= Lachie Schultz =

Australian rules footballer (born 1997)

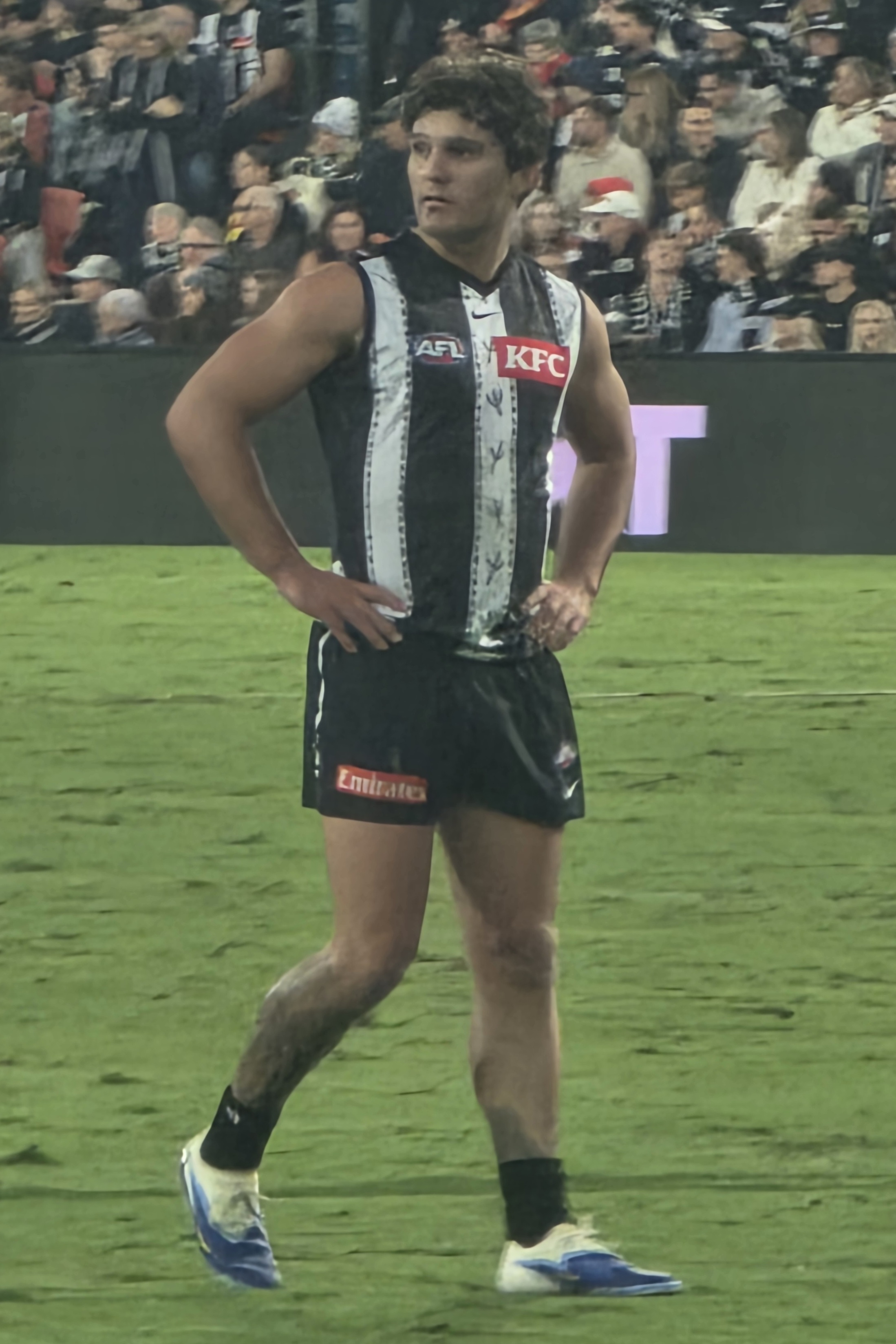
- Schultz playing for Collingwood in 2025

Personal information
- Full name: Lachlan Schultz
- Nickname: Shoota
- Born: 30 November 1997 (age 28); Moama, New South Wales
- Original teams: Moama Magpies(NSW), Williamstown (VFL)
- Draft: No. 57, 2018 national draft, Fremantle
- Height: 178 cm (5 ft 10 in)
- Weight: 78 kg (172 lb)
- Position: Forward

Club information
- Current club: Collingwood
- Number: 8

Playing career^{1}
Years	Club	Games (Goals)
2019–2023	Fremantle	90 (101)
2024–	Collingwood	58 (61)
Total		148 (162)
- ^{1} Playing statistics correct to the end of the 2026 season.

Career highlights
- 2× Glendinning–Allan Medal: 2022 (round 3), 2023 (round 22); Richard Pratt Medal: 2025

Lachlan Schultz (born 30 November 1997) is a professional Australian rules footballer who plays for the Collingwood Football Club in the Australian Football League (AFL). He previously played for the Fremantle Football Club from 2019–2023.

== Early career ==
Schultz was born and raised in Moama, New South Wales. He attended Moama Anglican Grammar but left after year 10 to pursue a plumbing apprenticeship. He played junior football for Moama Magpies in the Murray Football League before transferring to the Bendigo Pioneers in the TAC Cup. Following his draft year when he wasn’t drafted, he moved to Melbourne and played 37 games for Williamstown in the VFL over the next two seasons. He was drafted to Fremantle with the 57th selection in the 2018 national draft after being voted one of the better players in the VFL.

== AFL career ==
Schultz made his AFL debut for Fremantle in the opening round of the 2019 AFL season. Schultz kicked the match-winning goal for Fremantle against St Kilda in the 6th round of the 2020 AFL season.

At the end of 2021, Fremantle contracted Schultz for two more seasons with an option for a third after Hawthorn was tabling a three-year deal for him to move to Victoria. The Hawks would have been able to snare Schultz as a free agent if he did not come to terms with the Dockers, given he was delisted last year and re-listed as a rookie.

Schultz played almost every game in 2022 kicking 30 goals in a career-best season. Schultz finished second in Fremantle’s leading goalkicker award behind then teammate Rory Lobb, who kicked 36 goals for the season. During the year, Schultz was awarded the Glendinning–Allan Medal for his performance during the round three Western Derby, in which he collected 23 disposals and kicked two goals. Schultz was among Fremantle's best during round 17 against St Kilda at Marvel Stadium, kicking two goals.

Schultz kicked a game-high four goals in round 9 of the 2023 AFL season, during Fremantle's 17-point win over the Sydney Swans at the Sydney Cricket Ground. Schultz also kicked four goals during the Dockers' later clash against the Swans in round 19 at Optus Stadium. Schultz kicked two goals during round 20 in Fremantle's 7-point win over Geelong at Kardinia Park, the second of which put Fremantle in front in the dying stages of the fourth quarter. Schultz kicked a career-high and game-high 5 goals during the round 22 Western Derby. He was awarded his second Glendinning–Allan Medal for best on ground. Schultz signed a one-year contract extension during the 2023 season. On the first day of the 2023 AFL trade period, Schultz requested a trade to Collingwood, and he was traded on 16 October.

In Round 9, 2025, Schultz was concussed during a hard tackle by Fremantle's Jordan Clark. Collingwood captain Darcy Moore was critical that play was able to continue in the aftermath of Schultz's serious injury, saying it "didn't feel right".

== Statistics ==
Updated to the end of round 22, 2026.

Legend
G	Goals	K	Kicks	D	Disposals	T	Tackles
B	Behinds	H	Handballs	M	Marks

Season	Team	No.	Games	Totals							Averages (per game)							Votes
Season	Team	No.	Games	G	B	K	H	D	M	T	G	B	K	H	D	M	T	Votes
2019	Fremantle	28	7	4	3	46	36	82	15	17	0.6	0.4	6.6	5.1	11.7	2.1	2.4	0
2020 (Note: The 2020 season was played with 17 home-and-away matches per team (down from 22) and 16-minute quarters with time on (down from 20-minute quarters with time on) due to the impact of the COVID-19 pandemic.)	Fremantle	28	17	12	7	109	60	169	61	42	0.7	0.4	6.4	3.5	9.9	3.6	2.5	0
2021	Fremantle	28	20	22	17	148	72	220	80	54	1.1	0.9	7.4	3.6	11.0	4.0	2.7	0
2022	Fremantle	5	23	30	19	196	114	310	93	69	1.3	0.8	8.5	5.0	13.5	4.0	3.0	6
2023	Fremantle	5	23	33	19	208	157	365	100	95	1.4	0.8	9.0	6.8	15.9	4.3	4.1	6
2024	Collingwood	8	20	24	21	136	107	243	62	76	1.2	1.1	6.8	5.4	12.2	3.1	3.8	0
2025	Collingwood	8	16	13	14	128	104	232	78	79	0.8	0.9	8.0	6.5	14.5	4.9	4.9	3
2026	Collingwood	8	19	24	17	150	119	269	83	81	1.3	0.9	7.9	6.3	14.2	4.4	4.3	0
Career			145	162	117	1121	769	1890	572	513	1.1	0.8	7.7	5.3	13.0	3.9	3.5	15

== Honours and achievements ==
Individual

- Glendinning–Allan Medal: 2022 (round 3), 2023 (round 22)
- Richard Pratt Medal: 2025
