= Jerry McAuliffe =

Australian rules footballer (1909–1959)

Personal information
- Full name: John Augustine McAuliffe
- Born: 27 August 1909; Kalgoorlie, Western Australia
- Died: 4 May 1959 (aged 49); Leeton, New South Wales
- Original team: University Blacks (VAFA)

Playing career^{1}
Years	Club	Games (Goals)
1934	Hawthorn	10 (1)
- ^{1} Playing statistics correct to the end of 1934.

John Augustine "Jerry" McAuliffe (27 August 1909 – 4 May 1959) was an Australian rules footballer who played with Hawthorn in the Victorian Football League (VFL).

== Family ==
John Augustine McAuliffe was born at Kalgoorlie, Western Australia on 27 August 1909.

He married Ethel Dorothea Edna Dempsey (1909–1968) at St Patrick's Cathedral, Melbourne on 8 January 1938.

== Football ==
=== University Blacks (MAFA/VAFA) ===
In between 1928 and 1933 he played for the University Blacks in the Metropolitan Amateur Football Association (MAFA), later known as the Victorian Amateur Football Association (VAFA), and also a number of times for Melbourne University in its interstate matches with Adelaide University. He was awarded a full blue for football in April 1929.

=== Hawthorn (VFL) ===
He was cleared to Hawthorn from University Blacks on 16 May 1934.

=== Leeton ===
McAuliffe coached Leeton Football Club to the 1935 premiership of the Kinloch Cup Competition.

== Dentist ==
He graduated Bachelor of Dental Science (B.D.Sc.) from the University of Melbourne on 18 September 1933; and, upon arriving at Leeton, New South Wales, in 1935, "J.A. McAuliffe, L.D.S, B.D.Sc." began to practise as a dentist at Wade Avenue Leeton.
