= Ashley Sampi =

Australian rules footballer

Personal information
- Full name: Ashley Kevin Patrick Sampi
- Born: 21 January 1984 (age 42)
- Original team: South Fremantle
- Debut: Round 14, 6 July 2002, West Coast vs. Geelong, at Skilled Stadium
- Height: 177 cm (5 ft 10 in)
- Weight: 88 kg (194 lb)

Playing career^{1}
Years	Club	Games (Goals)
2002–2006	West Coast Eagles	78 (97)
- ^{1} Playing statistics correct to the end of 2006.

Career highlights
- Ross Glendinning Medal 2003; AFL Mark of the Year 2004

Ashley Kevin Patrick Sampi (born 21 January 1984) is an Indigenous Australian rules footballer who played for the West Coast Eagles in the Australian Football League. He is most well known for taking the 2004 AFL Mark of the Year.

== Early life ==
Sampi attended Trinity College in Perth, Western Australia.

== AFL career ==
Recruited by the West Coast Eagles at number six in the 2001 AFL draft, Sampi debuted against Geelong in round 14 of the 2002 season. In his debut season, Sampi played four games, including a final.

In round five of the 2003 season, Sampi kicked four goals in the Eagles' 35-point win over Fremantle. He was voted best-on-ground by a panel of judges but was controversially denied the Glendinning–Allan Medal; it was instead awarded to ruckman Michael Gardiner. Twenty years later, in August 2023, Sampi was recognised with a retrospective Glendinning–Allan Medal.

In 2004, Sampi won the AFL Mark of the Year. The following year, he played for the Eagles in the 2005 AFL Grand Final, a game the Eagles lost by four points to Sydney. In 2006, he played in 12 games and was not selected for the 2006 AFL Grand Final, where the Eagles won the premiership.

In 2007, Sampi did not play a game for the Eagles after being placed on the long-term injury list. He battled depression and spent most of the season in Broome. He was delisted following the season.

== Personal life ==
Sampi has a wife Gerri and multiple children.

On 3 May 2022, Sampi reported via his uncle Ernie Dingo's Facebook page that he had been diagnosed with multiple sclerosis (MS).
