= David Prescott =

Australian rules footballer

Personal information
- Full name: David Prescott
- Born: 11 May 1937
- Original team: National Bank Amateurs
- Height: 185 cm (6 ft 1 in)
- Weight: 77 kg (170 lb)

Playing career^{1}
Years	Club	Games (Goals)
1960–61	St Kilda	13 (7)
- ^{1} Playing statistics correct to the end of 1961.

David Prescott (born 11 May 1937) is a former Australian rules footballer who played with St Kilda in the Victorian Football League (VFL).
