= Jack Compton (Australian footballer) =

Australian rules footballer

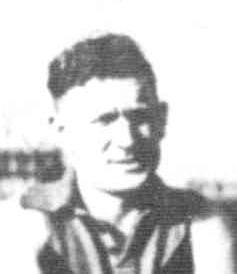

Personal information
- Full name: Jack Compton
- Born: 14 February 1918
- Died: 26 July 1983 (aged 65)
- Original team: Claremont
- Position: Centre half-forward

Playing career^{1}
Years	Club	Games (Goals)
1944	Melbourne	3 (2)
- ^{1} Playing statistics correct to the end of 1944.

Jack Compton (14 February 1918 – 26 July 1983) was an Australian rules footballer who played with Melbourne in the Victorian Football League (VFL).
