= Glendinning–Allan Medal =

Award in Australian rules football

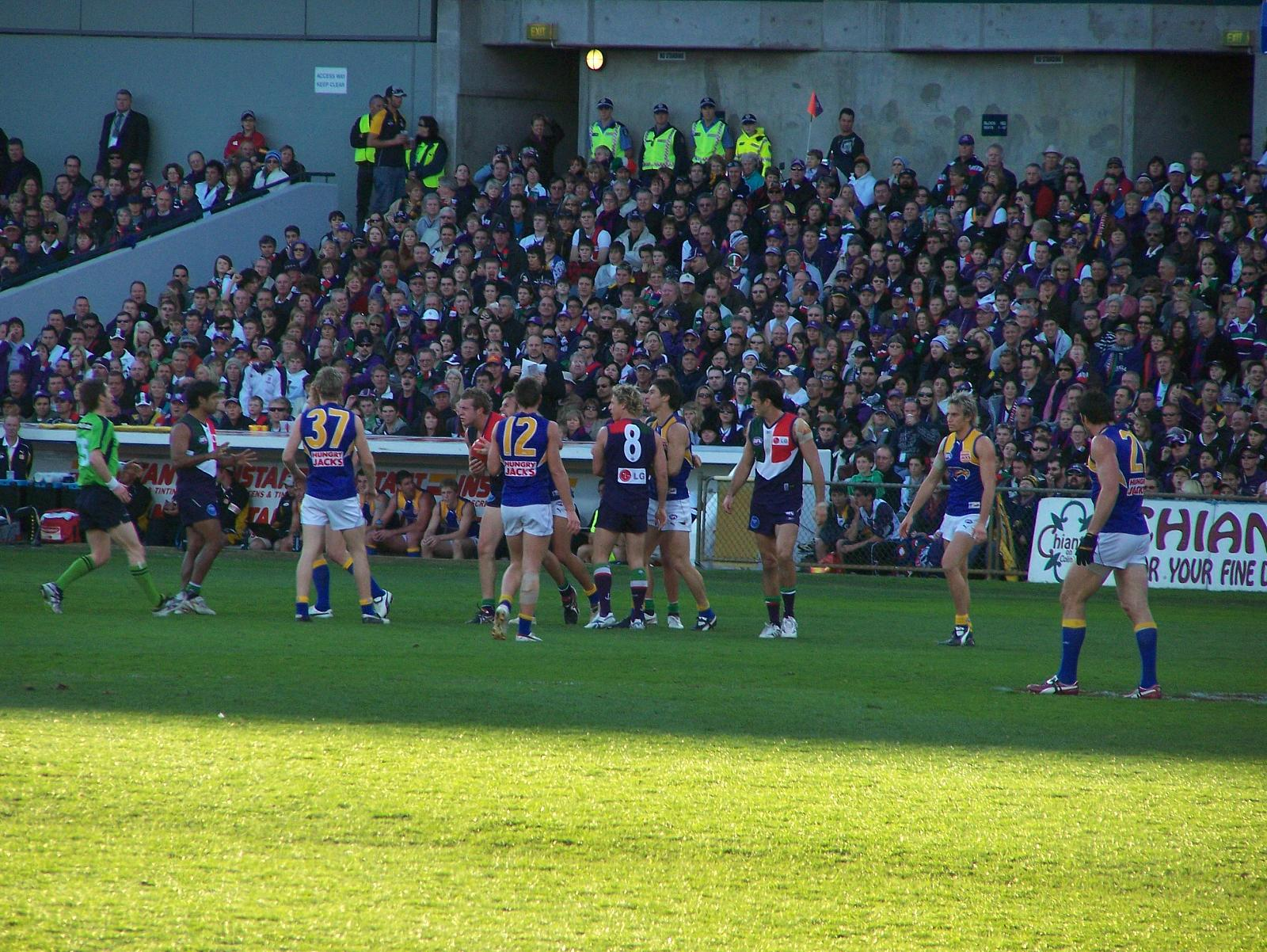
- The round 18, 2008 Western Derby, in which Matthew Pavlich won the award.
- Awarded for: The best player on the ground in Western Derby football matches
- Location: Perth
- Country: Australia
- Presented by: AFL
- First award: 1995
- Final award: 2026
- Currently held by: Murphy Reid (Fremantle)

The Glendinning–Allan Medal, formerly the Ross Glendinning Medal, is awarded to the player judged best on ground in each Western Derby football match played between Fremantle Football Club and the West Coast Eagles.

It is named after former Western Australian footballers Ross Glendinning, a Brownlow Medallist with North Melbourne and the inaugural captain of the West Coast Eagles, and Ben Allan, a former Hawthorn premiership player and the inaugural Fremantle captain. The medal, initially named the Ross Glendinning Medal, was first presented in 2001. In 2018, the name was changed to acknowledge both Fremantle's and West Coast's inaugural captains. Retrospective medals were also awarded to the best player from the initial 12 derbies between 1995 and 2000. The medal is voted by selection of media representatives, and joint medals are presented in the event that more than one player finishes with the equal-highest number of votes.

Fremantle's Paul Hasleby and Caleb Serong have won the medal 4 times each, currently the most by any player.

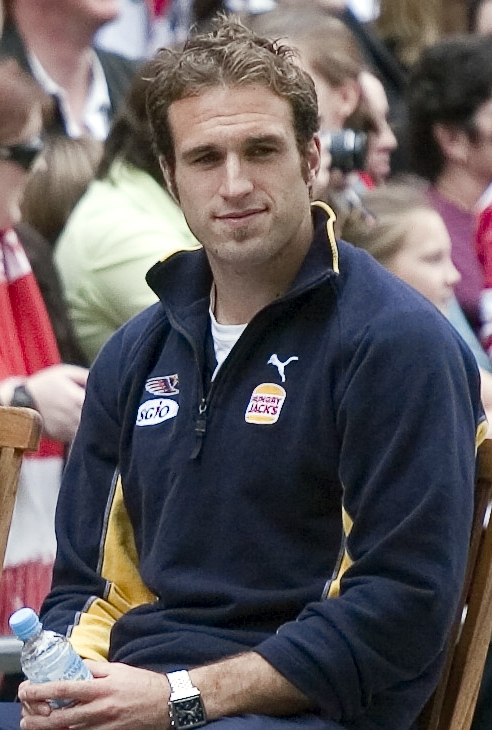
Chris Judd is the only player to win the award three times in a row. He did so between 2005 and 2006.

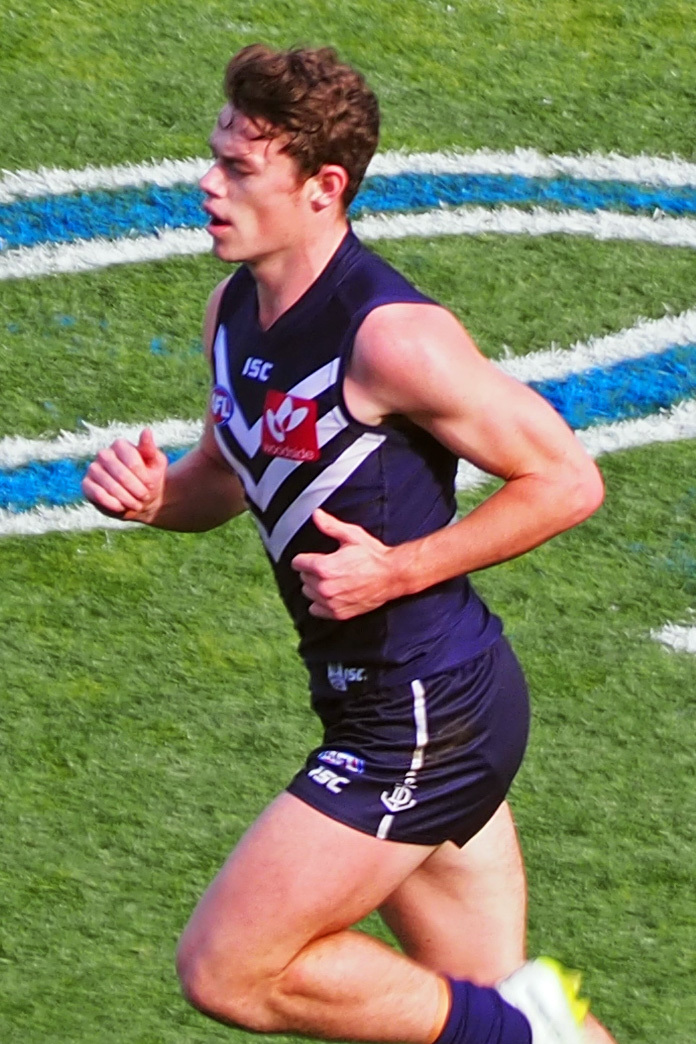
Lachie Neale won the award on three occasions.

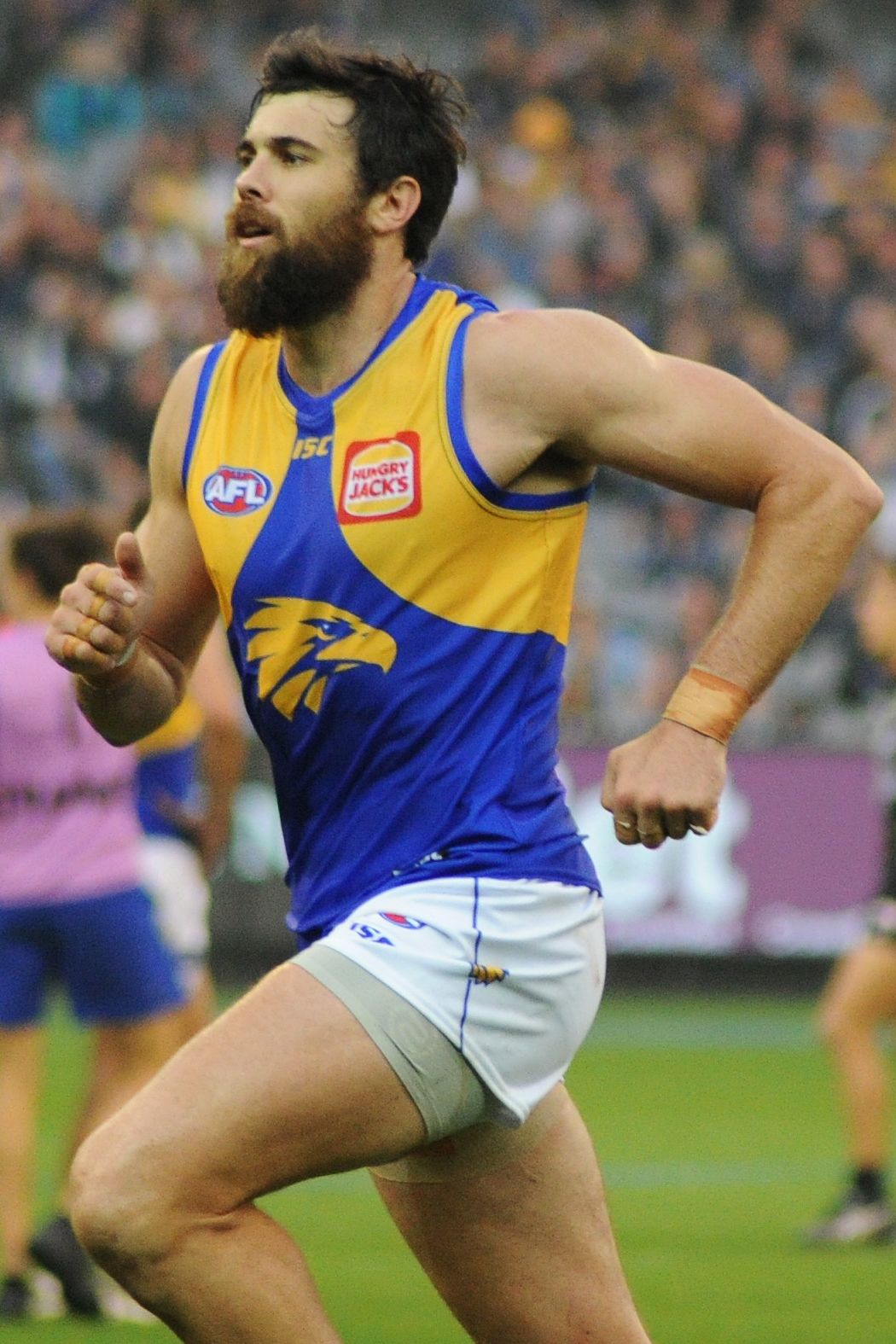
Josh Kennedy won the award on three occasions.

Year	Round	Winner
1995	Round 7	Brett Heady
1995	Round 22	Brett Heady (2)
1996	Round 1	Glen Jakovich
1996	Round 16	Guy McKenna
1997	Round 3	Drew Banfield
1997	Round 18	Dean Kemp
1998	Round 3	Fraser Gehrig
1998	Round 18	Chris Lewis
1999	Round 1	Guy McKenna (2)
1999	Round 16	Adrian Fletcher
2000	Round 6	Scott Cummings
2000	Round 21	Clive Waterhouse
2001	Round 4	Drew Banfield (2)
2001	Round 19	Glen Jakovich (2)
2002	Round 1	Chad Fletcher
2002	Round 16	Paul Hasleby
2003	Round 5	Michael Gardiner
2003	Round 5	Ashley Sampi
2003	Round 22	Paul Hasleby (2)
2004	Round 6	Paul Hasleby (3)
2004	Round 21	Chad Fletcher (2)
2005	Round 3	Chris Judd
2005	Round 20	Chris Judd (2)
2006	Round 6	Chris Judd (3)
2006	Round 21	Peter Bell
2007	Round 3	Michael Braun
2007	Round 18	Josh Carr
2008	Round 3	Matthew Pavlich
2008	Round 18	Matthew Pavlich (2)
2009	Round 6	Paul Hasleby (4)
2009	Round 17	Aaron Sandilands
2010	Round 6	Michael Barlow
2010	Round 18	Aaron Sandilands (2)
2011	Round 8	Matt Priddis
2011	Round 18	Dean Cox
2012	Round 9	Matt Rosa
2012	Round 19	Matthew Pavlich (3)
2013	Round 1	Michael Barlow (2)
2013	Round 1	David Mundy
2013	Round 16	Michael Barlow (3)
2014	Round 7	Lachie Neale
2014	Round 15	Stephen Hill
2015	Round 3	Lachie Neale (2)
2015	Round 20	Josh Hill
2016	Round 3	Matt Priddis (2)
2016	Round 20	Josh Kennedy
2017	Round 6	Josh Kennedy (2)
2017	Round 17	Shannon Hurn
2018	Round 6	Shannon Hurn (2)
2018	Round 6	Lachie Neale (3)
2018	Round 20	Elliot Yeo
2019	Round 4	Shannon Hurn (3)
2019	Round 16	Brad Sheppard
2020	Round 8	Josh Kennedy (3)
2021	Round 7	Tim Kelly
2021	Round 22	Caleb Serong
2022	Round 3	Lachie Schultz
2022	Round 22	Sean Darcy
2023	Round 3	Caleb Serong (2)
2023	Round 22	Lachie Schultz (2)
2024	Round 6	Elliot Yeo (2)
2024	Round 20	Caleb Serong (3)
2025	Round 3	Caleb Serong (4)
2025	Round 20	Hayden Young
2026	Round 6	Jordan Clark
2026	Round 20	Murphy Reid

== Multiple winners ==
Multiple winners
Player	Won	Years
Paul Hasleby	4	2002, 2003, 2004, 2009
Caleb Serong	4	2021, 2023, 2024, 2025
Josh Kennedy	3	2016, 2017, 2020
Shannon Hurn	3	2017, 2018, 2019
Lachie Neale	3	2014, 2015, 2018
Michael Barlow	3	2010, 2013, 2013
Matthew Pavlich	3	2008, 2008, 2012
Chris Judd	3	2005, 2005, 2006
Elliot Yeo	2	2018, 2024
Lachie Schultz	2	2022, 2023
Matt Priddis	2	2011, 2016
Aaron Sandilands	2	2009, 2010
Chad Fletcher	2	2002, 2004
Drew Banfield	2	1997, 2001
Glen Jakovich	2	1996, 2001
Guy McKenna	2	1996, 1999
Brett Heady	2	1995, 1995

== Controversies ==
- Round 5, 2003: The five media selectors chose Ashley Sampi as the preferred recipient, but Glendinning overruled them and awarded the medal to Michael Gardiner. In August 2023, the Eagles recognised Sampi with a retrospective medal after the West Australian Football Commission approved for Gardiner and Sampi to become joint winners.
- Round 6, 2006: After Fremantle's narrow win, the medal was awarded to Chris Judd of West Coast, which attracted boos from the Fremantle fans in the crowd. Fremantle coach Chris Connolly criticised his club's supporters for the booing.
- Round 3, 2007: Michael Braun finished his acceptance speech with "Let's have a fucking good year". He was fined $5,000 by the AFL, who overruled the $500 penalty given to him by his club.
- Round 6, 2018: The name of the medal at the time became a source of controversy due to the Fremantle Football Club's decision not to award it a week before their home derby because they felt that the name "Ross Glendinning" alone did not reflect the club. It was later renamed the "Glendinning–Allan Medal" after the inaugural captains of each team.
