= Michael Braun (footballer) =

Australian rules footballer

Personal information
- Full name: Michael Braun
- Born: 24 March 1978 (age 48)
- Original team: Echuca United / Bendigo U18
- Height: 175 cm (5 ft 9 in)
- Weight: 77 kg (170 lb)
- Position: midfield

Playing career^{1}
Years	Club	Games (Goals)
1997–2008	West Coast	228 (66)
- ^{1} Playing statistics correct to the end of 2008.

Career highlights
- AFL premiership player: 2006; 2× AFL Rising Star nominee: 1997, 1998; Ross Glendinning Medal: 2007; Best Clubman 2003

Michael Braun (born 24 March 1978) is an Australian rules footballer who played for the AFL's West Coast Eagles.

Playing for Echuca United as a youngster in the Northern and Echuca Football League, he was recruited from Echuca/Bendigo Pioneers and made his debut in 1997.

Braun announced his AFL retirement midway through the 2008 AFL season, effective at the end of the season.

After retiring from playing football he became the Colts' coach at East Perth Football Club in the WAFL.

== Honours ==
- Runner-up in the Bendigo Pioneers best and fairest in 1996, and represented Victoria Country in the championships.
- Runner-up in the club champion award 1999
- Best Clubman in 2003
- Member of the International Rules team in 2004
- Member of the West Coast Eagles 2006 premiership team

== Controversies ==
In 2007, Braun ended his acceptance speech for the Ross Glendinning Medal with "Let's have a fucking good year" on live television and in front of a crowd of 42,000 at Subiaco Oval. The Eagles originally fined him $500, but the AFL stepped in, severely reprimanded the Eagles and fined him a further $5,000 for the blunder. It was also the same match in which teammate Adam Selwood was involved in an altercation with Fremantle's Des Headland.

Later that year, then-Western Bulldogs player Jason Akermanis wrote a column about performance-enhancing drugs and his views on their presence in sport, which included comments that he believed a specific opposing player, whom he did not name, had been using the drugs based on how strong a runner the player was for his size. The Seven Network and Fairfax Media named Braun as the player in question, damaging his reputation and subjecting him to an investigation by the Australian Sports Anti-Doping Authority, which cleared him of wrongdoing. Braun was ultimately awarded defamation damages against Seven and Fairfax, and received an apology from Akermanis, who conceded that he had been referring to Braun, and admitted that he had been wrong.

== Statistics ==
Legend
G	Goals	K	Kicks	D	Disposals	T	Tackles
B	Behinds	H	Handballs	M	Marks

Season	Team	No.	Games	Totals							Averages (per game)						
Season	Team	No.	Games	G	B	K	H	D	M	T	G	B	K	H	D	M	T
1997	West Coast	38	7	1	0	61	33	94	19	15	0.1	0.0	8.7	4.7	13.4	2.7	2.1
1998	West Coast	10	20	14	10	201	101	302	65	41	0.7	0.5	10.1	5.1	15.1	3.3	2.1
1999	West Coast	10	24	4	10	287	167	454	104	30	0.2	0.4	12.0	7.0	18.9	4.3	1.3
2000	West Coast	10	12	6	4	124	89	213	55	19	0.5	0.3	10.3	7.4	17.8	4.6	1.6
2001	West Coast	10	9	3	1	69	39	108	32	17	0.3	0.1	7.7	4.3	12.0	3.6	1.9
2002	West Coast	10	20	4	3	185	86	271	61	51	0.2	0.2	9.3	4.3	13.6	3.1	2.6
2003	West Coast	10	22	4	6	225	127	352	78	53	0.2	0.3	10.2	5.8	16.0	3.5	2.4
2004	West Coast	10	23	9	9	259	172	431	119	71	0.4	0.4	11.3	7.5	18.7	5.2	3.1
2005	West Coast	10	24	7	5	274	222	496	127	48	0.3	0.2	11.4	9.3	20.7	5.3	2.0
2006	West Coast	10	25	4	8	248	256	504	110	73	0.2	0.3	9.9	10.2	20.2	4.4	2.9
2007	West Coast	10	24	6	6	227	287	514	93	68	0.2	0.1	8.2	10.6	18.7	3.6	2.9
2008	West Coast	10	18	4	1	147	190	337	65	53	0.2	0.1	8.2	10.6	18.7	3.6	2.9
Career			228	66	63	2307	1769	4076	928	539	0.3	0.3	10.1	7.8	17.9	4.1	2.4

== Outside football ==
Michael married his long-time girlfriend Bree in November 2007 and they have a son called Noah born in October 2008. They now also have a girl called Logan.

Braun can also be found regularly reviewing West Australian restaurants for a local website.
