= Peter Hines =

Australian rules footballer

Personal information
- Full name: Peter Hines
- Born: 31 October 1948 (age 78)
- Original team: Frankston
- Height: 188 cm (6 ft 2 in)
- Weight: 87 kg (192 lb)
- Position: Ruck

Playing career^{1}
Years	Club	Games (Goals)
1968–70	Footscray	12 (12)
- ^{1} Playing statistics correct to the end of 1970.

Peter Hines (born 31 October 1948) is a former Australian rules footballer who played with Footscray in the Victorian Football League (VFL).
